= List of Sittingbourne F.C. seasons =

Sittingbourne F.C. is an English football club based in Sittingbourne, Kent. The club were founded in 1886 and adopted professionalism from the 1898–99 season, but returned to amateurism for a short period between 1931 and 1946. The club have played in various semi-professional leagues based in the south-east of England: they were founder members of the Kent League in 1894 and were also members of the South Eastern Counties League, the Southern League, the reincarnated Kent League, the Isthmian League and (as a subsidiary competition periodically between 1901 and 1964) the Thames and Medway Combination. The club colours are black and red, they play home matches at Woodstock Park and are nicknamed 'the Brickies'. They currently play in the Isthmian League South East Division.

Sittingbourne have played in the FA Cup since 1894 excluding periods of absence in 1897, 1910, during World War I and between 1931 and 1946; their best performances in the competition were during the 1920s when they reached the sixth qualifying round on one occasion and the second round proper twice. Additionally they have competed in the FA Trophy since 1976 (reaching the quarter-finals in 2025), excepting between 1987 and 1992 when they were eligible for the FA Vase.

== Seasons ==
| Season | League | | | | | | | | | FA Cup | FA Trophy (T) / Vase (V) | Other |
| Season | Division | P | W | D | L | GF | GA | Pts | Pos | FA Cup | FA Trophy (T) / Vase (V) | Other |
|---|---|---|---|---|---|---|---|---|---|---|---|---|
| 1893–94 | – | | | | | | | | | 1Q | | |
| 1894–95 | Kent League D1 | 16 | 7 | 2 | 7 | 30 | 37 | 16 | 6/9 | 1Q | | |
| 1895–96 | Kent League D1 | 22 | 4 | 5 | 13 | 40 | 73 | 13 | 10/12 | 2Q | | |
| 1896–97 | Kent League D1 | 16 | 8 | 2 | 6 | 30 | 33 | 18 | 3/9 | Pr | | |
| 1897–98 | Kent League D1 | 14 | 6 | 4 | 4 | 30 | 23 | 16 | 3/8 | – | | |
| 1898–99 | Kent League | 24 | 11 | 4 | 9 | 49 | 33 | 26 | 5/13 | 2Q | | |
| 1899– 1900 | Kent League | 20 | 8 | 4 | 8 | 42 | 30 | 20 | 5/11 | Pr | | |
| 1900–01 | Kent League | 16 | 9 | 4 | 3 | 29 | 21 | 22 | 2/9 | 2Q | | |
| 1901–02 | Kent League | 20 | 15 | 2 | 3 | 44 | 13 | 32 | 2/11; L:cp-o | 2Q | | W: KSC |
| 1901–02 | Thames Medway 1 | 12 | 6 | 3 | 3 | 18 | 14 | 15 | 3/7 | 2Q | | W: KSC |
| 1902–03 | Kent League | 16 | 12 | 3 | 1 | 45 | 11 | 27 | 1/9 | 2Q | | sf: KSC |
| 1902–03 | Thames Medway 1 | 12 | 10 | 1 | 1 | 34 | 8 | 21 | 1/7 | 2Q | | sf: KSC |
| 1903–04 | Kent League | 16 | 8 | 5 | 3 | 38 | 21 | 21 | 3/9 | 1Q | | fnl: KSC |
| 1903–04 | Thames Medway 1 | 10 | 2 | 2 | 6 | 12 | 15 | 6 | 5/6 | 1Q | | fnl: KSC |
| 1904–05 | Kent League | 18 | 12 | 2 | 4 | 53 | 22 | 26 | 3/10 | EP | | fnl: KSC |
| 1904–05 | Thames Medway 1 | 10 | 5 | 4 | 1 | 22 | 11 | 14 | 2/6 | EP | | fnl: KSC |
| 1905–06 | South Eastern D2 | 22 | 16 | 4 | 2 | 82 | 26 | 36 | 2/12↑P | 1Q | | sf: KSC |
| 1905–06 | Thames Medway 1 | 12 | 4 | 4 | 4 | 25 | 23 | 12 | 4/7 | 1Q | | sf: KSC |
| 1906–07 | South Eastern D1 | 24 | 9 | 5 | 10 | 46 | 51 | 23 | 6/13 | 2Q | | fnl: KSC |
| 1906–07 | Thames Medway 1 | 10 | 7 | 1 | 2 | 24 | 9 | 15 | 2/6 | 2Q | | fnl: KSC |
| 1907–08 | South Eastern D1 | 34 | 10 | 5 | 19 | 63 | 90 | 25 | 15/18 | Pr | | fnl: KSC |
| 1907–08 | Thames Medway 1 | 8 | 6 | 1 | 1 | 27 | 9 | 13 | 1/5 | Pr | | fnl: KSC |
| 1908–09 | South Eastern D1 | 38 | 9 | 7 | 22 | 53 | 90 | 25 | 18/20 | 1Q | | sf: KSC |
| 1908–09 | Thames Medway 1 | 6 | 4 | 1 | 1 | 13 | 5 | 9 | 2/4; L:cp-o | 1Q | | sf: KSC |
| 1909–10 | Kent League D1 | 22 | 15 | 3 | 4 | 55 | 23 | 33 | 2/12 | 1Q | | |
| 1909–10 | Thames Medway 1 | 12 | 5 | 3 | 4 | 23 | 18 | 13 | 3/7 | 1Q | | |
| 1910–11 | Kent League D1 | 26 | 12 | 7 | 7 | 58 | 46 | 31 | 4/14 | – | | fnl: KSC |
| 1910–11 | Thames Medway B | 4 | 0 | 0 | 4 | 2 | 8 | 0 | 3/3 | – | | fnl: KSC |
| 1911–12 | Kent League D1 | 28 | 10 | 4 | 14 | 59 | 59 | 24 | 9/15 | 2Q | | sf: KSC |
| 1911–12 | Thames Medway 1 | 6 | 3 | 2 | 1 | 11 | 7 | 8 | 1/4 | 2Q | | sf: KSC |
| 1912–13 | Kent League D1 | 28 | 10 | 7 | 11 | 54 | 59 | 27 | 8/15 | Pr | | |
| 1912–13 | Thames Medway 1 | 4 | 2 | 1 | 1 | 6 | 3 | 5 | 2/3; L:cp-o | Pr | | |
| 1913–14 | Kent League D1 | 30 | 12 | 3 | 15 | 41 | 64 | 27 | 10/16 | Pr | | |
| 1913–14 | Thames Medway 1 | 4 | 0 | 2 | 2 | 6 | 8 | 2 | 3/3 | Pr | | |
| 1914–15 | – | | | | | | | | | 2Q | | |
| 1915–19 | Competitive football suspended owing to World War I | | | | | | | | | | | |
| 1919–20 | Kent League D1 | 24 | 7 | 4 | 13 | 34 | 52 | 18 | 12/13 | 2Q | | sf: KSC |
| 1919–20 | Thames Medway 1 | 6 | 1 | 1 | 4 | 3 | 13 | 3 | 4/4 | 2Q | | sf: KSC |
| 1920–21 | Kent League D1 | 32 | 15 | 7 | 10 | 69 | 49 | 37 | 6/17 | Pr | | sf: KSC |
| 1921–22 | Kent League D1 | 28 | 7 | 6 | 15 | 40 | 54 | 20 | 11/15 | Pr | | |
| 1921–22 | Thames Medway 1 | 5 ◊ | 0 | 0 | 5 | 3 | 13 | 0 | ?/4 ◊ | Pr | | |
| 1922–23 | Kent League D1 | 32 | 24 | 4 | 4 | 102 | 20 | 52 | 2/17 | 4Q | | fnl: KSC |
| 1923–24 | Kent League D1 | 30 | 17 | 5 | 8 | 66 | 30 | 39 | 3/16 | 6Q | | sf: KSC; sf: KLC |
| 1923–24 | Thames Medway 1 | 6 | 4 | 1 | 1 | 13 | 6 | 9 | 2/4 | 6Q | | sf: KSC; sf: KLC |
| 1924–25 | Kent League D1 | 34 | 18 | 7 | 9 | 69 | 40 | 43 | 4/18 | 4Q | | fnl: KSC; sf: KLC |
| 1924–25 | Thames Medway 1 | 4 | 3 | 0 | 1 | 10 | 6 | 6 | 1/3 | 4Q | | fnl: KSC; sf: KLC |
| 1925–26 | Kent League D1 | 36 | 23 | 7 | 6 | 122 | 46 | 53 | 3/19 | R2 | | W: KLC |
| 1925–26 | Thames Medway 1 | 6 | 5 | 0 | 1 | | | 10 | 1/4 | R2 | | W: KLC |
| 1926–27 | Kent League D1 | 26 | 20 | 0 | 6 | 84 | 36 | 40 | 2/14 | R1 | | |
| 1926–27 | Thames Medway 1 | 10 | 6 | 2 | 2 | 25 | 12 | 14 | 2/6 | R1 | | |
| 1927–28 | Southern Lge Eastn. | 34 | 16 | 5 | 13 | 64 | 70 | 37 | 8/18 | 4Q | | fnl: KSC |
| 1927–28 | Thames Medway 1 | 6 | 4 | 1 | 1 | 16 | 9 | 9 | 1/4 | 4Q | | fnl: KSC |
| 1928–29 | Southern Lge Eastn,. | 36 | 11 | 1 | 24 | 59 | 98 | 23 | 17/19 | R2 | | W: KSC |
| 1928–29 | Thames Medway 1 | 6 | 4 | 0 | 2 | 21 | 12 | 8 | 2/4 | R2 | | W: KSC |
| 1929–30 | Southern Lge Eastn. | 32 | 10 | 5 | 17 | 55 | 59 | 25 | 15/17 | 4Q | | W: KSC sf: KLC |
| 1930–31 | Kent Lge Div 1 | 36 | 15 | 5 | 16 | 93 | 79 | 35 | 9/19 | R1 | | sf: KLC |
| 1931–32 | Kent League D1 | 36 | 6 | 5 | 25 | 43 | 111 | 17 | 18/19 | – | | |
| 1932–33 | Kent League D1 | 34 | 13 | 5 | 16 | 70 | 109 | 31 | 11/18 | – | | |
| 1933–34 | Kent League D1 | 36 | 11 | 10 | 15 | 57 | 90 | 32 | 13/19 | – | | |
| 1934–35 | Kent League D1 | 36 | 16 | 4 | 16 | 67 | 76 | 36 | 8/19 | – | | |
| 1935–36 | Kent League D1 | 36 | 13 | 9 | 14 | 77 | 84 | 35 | 11/19 | – | | sf: KSC |
| 1936–37 | Kent League D1 | 32 | 9 | 8 | 15 | 68 | 86 | 26 | 12/17 | – | | |
| 1937–38 | Kent League D1 | 32 | 14 | 4 | 14 | 74 | 64 | 32 | 8/17 | – | | |
| 1938–39 | Kent League D1 | 28 | 8 | 7 | 13 | 60 | 74 | 23 | 10/15 | – | | |
| 1939–46 | Competitive football suspended owing to World War II | | | | | | | | | | | |
| 1946–47 | Kent League D1 | 30 | 13 | 5 | 12 | 97 | 79 | 31 | 10/16 | – | | |
| 1947–48 | Kent League D1 | 34 | 15 | 7 | 12 | 86 | 79 | 37 | 9/18 | EP | | |
| 1948–49 | Kent League D1 | 34 | 12 | 4 | 18 | 57 | 71 | 28 | 14/18 | Pr | | |
| 1949–50 | Kent League D1 | 32 | 10 | 5 | 17 | 46 | 70 | 25 | 13/17 | EP | | |
| 1950–51 | Kent League D1 | 32 | 17 | 5 | 10 | 75 | 52 | 39 | 7/17 | 2Q | | sf: KSC |
| 1951–52 | Kent League D1 | 32 | 17 | 4 | 11 | 74 | 66 | 38 | 6/17 | 1Q | | sf: KSC |
| 1952–53 | Kent League D1 | 32 | 18 | 8 | 6 | 81 | 60 | 44 | 3/17 | 2Q | | |
| 1953–54 | Kent League D1 | 30 | 13 | 10 | 7 | 61 | 40 | 36 | 5/16 | 1Q | | sf: KLC |
| 1954–55 | Kent League D1 | 32 | 18 | 5 | 9 | 77 | 50 | 41 | 4/17 | 3Q | | |
| 1954–55 | Thames Medway 1 | 8 | 4 | 2 | 2 | 17 | 9 | 10 | 2/5 | 3Q | | |
| 1955–56 | Kent League D1 | 32 | 16 | 8 | 8 | 73 | 47 | 40 | 5/17 | 3Q | | sf: KLC |
| 1955–56 | Thames Medway 1 | 10 | 7 | 1 | 2 | 28 | 11 | 15 | 1/6 | 3Q | | sf: KLC |
| 1956–57 | Kent League D1 | 32 | 14 | 7 | 11 | 65 | 49 | 35 | 7/17 | 3Q | | |
| 1956–57 | Thames Medway 1 | 6 | 4 | 0 | 2 | 15 | 8 | 8 | 2/4 | 3Q | | |
| 1957–58 | Kent League D1 | 34 | 25 | 6 | 3 | 77 | 28 | 56 | 1/18 | 1Q | | W: KSC |
| 1957–58 | Thames Medway 1 | 4 | 2 | 0 | 2 | 9 | 5 | 4 | 2/3 | 1Q | | W: KSC |
| 1958–59 | Kent League D1 | 34 | 26 | 6 | 2 | 90 | 25 | 58 | 1/18 | 3Q | | W: KLC |
| 1958–59 | Thames Medway: Medway Div | 4 | 3 | 1 | 0 | 9 | 4 | 7 | 1/3; W:ip-o | 3Q | | W: KLC |
| 1959–60 | Southern Lge D1 | 42 | 20 | 7 | 15 | 66 | 56 | 46 | 6/22 | 1Q | | |
| 1959–60 | Thms.Med: Med D | 4 | 1 | 2 | 1 | 10 | 6 | 4 | 2/3 | 1Q | | |
| 1960–61 | Southern Lge D1 | 40 | 21 | 10 | 9 | 77 | 63 | 52 | 5/21 | 2Q | | fnl: KSC |
| 1960–61 | Thames Medway: Medway Div | 4 | 3 | 1 | 0 | 14 | 3 | 7 | 1/3; W:ip-o | 2Q | | fnl: KSC |
| 1961–62 | Southern Lge D1 | 38 | 16 | 12 | 10 | 69 | 51 | 44 | 7/20 | 1Q | | |
| 1961–62 | Thames Medway: Medway Div | 4 | 2 | 1 | 1 | 8 | 5 | 5 | 1/3; W:ip-o | 1Q | | |
| 1962–63 | Southern Lge D1 | 38 | 12 | 3 | 23 | 56 | 75 | 27 | 17/20 | R1 | | |
| 1962–63 | Thames Medway 1 | Played as a cup competition | | | | | | | W | R1 | | |
| 1963–64 | Southern Lge D1 | 42 | 15 | 8 | 19 | 52 | 70 | 38 | 17/22 | 3Q | | |
| 1963–64 | Thames Medway1 | 6 | 4 | 1 | 1 | 12 | 10 | 9 | 1/4 | 3Q | | |
| 1964–65 | Southern Lge D1 | 42 | 8 | 5 | 29 | 58 | 103 | 21 | 22/22 | 1Q | | |
| 1965–66 | Southern Lge D1 | 46 | 11 | 12 | 23 | 77 | 121 | 34 | 19/24 | 3Q | | |
| 1966–67 | Southern Lge D1 | 46 | 5 | 10 | 31 | 44 | 136 | 20 | 24/24 | 2Q | | |
| 1967–68 | Kent Premier League | 34 | 24 | 2 | 8 | 93 | 34 | 50 | 2/18 | 1Q | | |
| 1968–69 | Kent League | 34 | 21 | 6 | 7 | 77 | 40 | 48 | 4/18 | 2Q | | |
| 1969–70 | Kent League | 28 | 15 | 7 | 6 | 60 | 36 | 37 | 4/15 | 1Q | T: 1Q | sf: KLC |
| 1970–71 | Kent League | 38 | 21 | 8 | 9 | 95 | 57 | 50 | 4/20 | 1Q | T: 2Q | |
| 1971–72 | Kent League | 38 | 18 | 11 | 9 | 72 | 51 | 47 | 4/20 | Pr | T: 1Q | |
| 1972–73 | Kent League | 38 | 26 | 6 | 6 | 108 | 37 | 58 | 2/20 | 3Q | T: 1Q | fnl: KLC |
| 1973–74 | Kent League | 36 | 27 | 5 | 4 | 97 | 29 | 59 | 2/19 | 2Q | T: 1Q | W: KLC |
| 1974–75 | Kent League | 36 | 26 | 2 | 8 | 90 | 37 | 54 | 3/19 | 1Q | T: Pr | fnl: KLC |
| 1975–76 | Kent League | 36 | 26 | 5 | 5 | 87 | 38 | 57 | 1/19 | 1Q | T: Pr | fnl: KLC |
| 1976–77 | Kent League | 32 | 21 | 5 | 6 | 68 | 48 | 47 | 2/17 | Pr | T: Pr | |
| 1977–78 | Kent League | 34 | 8 | 9 | 17 | 37 | 60 | 25 | 13/18 | 1Q | T: Pr | |
| 1978–79 | Kent League D1 | 34 | 16 | 7 | 11 | 57 | 42 | 39 | 6/18 | 1Q | T: Pr | |
| 1979–80 | Kent League D1 | 32 | 15 | 9 | 8 | 49 | 43 | 39 | 5/17 | 1Q | T: 1Q | sf:KLC |
| 1980–81 | Kent League D1 | 32 | 18 | 5 | 9 | 74 | 29 | 41 | 5/17 | 1Q | T: Pr | W: KLC |
| 1981–82 | Kent League D1 | 30 | 16 | 11 | 3 | 65 | 33 | 43 | 2/16 | 1Q | T: Pr | sf: KLC |
| 1982–83 | Kent League D1 | 32 | 15 | 10 | 7 | 70 | 33 | 40 | 4/17 | 1Q | T: Pr | |
| 1983–84 | Kent League D1 | 30 | 24 | 3 | 3 | 87 | 26 | 75 | 1/16 | 3Q | T: Pr | sf: KLC |
| 1984–85 | Kent League D1 | 32 | 21 | 4 | 7 | 77 | 43 | 67 | 3/17 | 3Q | T: 1Q | |
| 1985–86 | Kent League D1 | 34 | 21 | 7 | 6 | 76 | 37 | 70 | 2/18 | 1Q | T: 2Q | sf: KLC |
| 1986–87 | Kent League D1 | 34 | 17 | 8 | 9 | 60 | 43 | 59 | 6/18 | Pr | T: 1Q | fnl: KLC |
| 1987–88 | Kent League D1 | 36 | 17 | 11 | 8 | 68 | 53 | 62 | 4/19 | Pr | V: Pr | |
| 1988–89 | Kent League D1 | 38 | 18 | 12 | 8 | 59 | 43 | 66 | 5/20 | Pr | V: Pr | |
| 1989–90 | Kent League D1 | 38 | 27 | 5 | 6 | 85 | 39 | 86 | 2/20 | 1Q | V: R2 | |
| 1990–91 | Kent League D1 | 40 | 32 | 8 | 0 | 87 | 19 | 104 | 1/21↑P | 2Q | V: R1 | |
| 1991–92 | Southern Lge Sth | 42 | 19 | 10 | 13 | 63 | 41 | 61* | 9/22 | 2Q | V: R4 | |
| 1992–93 | Southern Lge Sth | 42 | 26 | 12 | 4 | 102 | 43 | 90 | 1/22↑P | 4Q | V: R4 | |
| 1993–94 | Southern Lge Prem | 42 | 17 | 13 | 12 | 65 | 48 | 64 | 8/22 | 2Q | T: 3Q | |
| 1994–95 | Southern Lge Prem | 42 | 11 | 10 | 21 | 51 | 73 | 43 | 20/22↓R | 1Q | T: 1Q | |
| 1995–96 | Southern Lge Sth | 42 | 28 | 4 | 10 | 102 | 44 | 88 | 1/22↑P | 4Q | T: 2Q | |
| 1996–97 | Southern Lge Prem | 42 | 19 | 7 | 16 | 76 | 65 | 64 | 8/22 | 2Q | T: 3Q | |
| 1997–98 | Southern Lge Prem | 42 | 12 | 8 | 22 | 47 | 66 | 44 | 20/22↓R | 4Q | T: R1 | |
| 1998–99 | Southern Lge Sth | 42 | 12 | 18 | 12 | 53 | 56 | 54 | 13/22 | 2Q | T: R2 | |
| 1999– 2000 | Southern Lge East | 42 | 13 | 7 | 22 | 48 | 75 | 46 | 16/22 | 2Q | T: R1 | |
| 2000–01 | Southern Lge East | 42 | 8 | 9 | 25 | 41 | 79 | 33 | 21/22 | 1Q | T: R1 | |
| 2001–02 | Southern Lge East | 42 | 14 | 4 | 24 | 46 | 69 | 46 | 17/22 | 1Q | T: R1 | |
| 2002–03 | Southern Lge East | 42 | 15 | 8 | 19 | 57 | 69 | 53 | 12/22 | Pr | T: Q | |
| 2003–04 | Southern Lge East | 42 | 18 | 8 | 16 | 61 | 55 | 62 | 10/22 | 2Q | T: R1 | |
| 2004–05 | Southern Lge East | 42 | 10 | 12 | 20 | 53 | 70 | 42 | 19/22 | Pr | T: R1 | |
| 2005–06 | Southern Lge East | 42 | 12 | 12 | 18 | 53 | 69 | 48 | 18/22 | Pr | T: 3Q | |
| 2006–07 | Isthmian Lge D1S | 42 | 14 | 15 | 13 | 68 | 63 | 57 | 10/22 | 2Q | T: 2Q | |
| 2007–08 | Isthmian Lge D1S | 42 | 20 | 7 | 15 | 56 | 58 | 67 | 9/22 | 1Q | T: 1Q | |
| 2008–09 | Isthmian Lge D1S | 42 | 19 | 13 | 10 | 63 | 54 | 70 | 6/22 | 1Q | T: 1Q | |
| 2009–10 | Isthmian Lge D1S | 42 | 18 | 7 | 17 | 63 | 48 | 61 | 9/22 | 2Q | T: 1Q | W: KSC |
| 2010–11 | Isthmian Lge D1S | 42 | 16 | 8 | 18 | 52 | 66 | 56 | 11/22 | Pr | T: Pr | |
| 2011–12 | Isthmian Lge D1S | 40 | 6 | 12 | 22 | 36 | 75 | 30 | 19/21 | 1Q | T: 1Q | |
| 2012–13 | Isthmian Lge D1S | 42 | 16 | 13 | 13 | 67 | 56 | 61 | 9/22 | 1Q | T: 1Q | |
| 2013–14 | Isthmian Lge D1S | 46 | 16 | 13 | 17 | 69 | 75 | 61 | 14/24 | 3Q | T: Pr | |
| 2014–15 | Isthmian Lge D1S | 46 | 16 | 11 | 19 | 55 | 69 | 59 | 12/24 | Pr | T: Pr | |
| 2015–16 | Isthmian Lge D1S | 46 | 16 | 6 | 24 | 63 | 77 | 54 | 18/24 | 2Q | T: Pr | sf: ILC |
| 2016–17 | Isthmian Lge D1S | 46 | 17 | 11 | 18 | 71 | 86 | 62 | 15/24 | Pr | T: Pr | |
| 2017–18 | Isthmian Lge Sth | 46 | 18 | 8 | 20 | 68 | 72 | 62 | 14/24 | Pr | T: 2Q | |
| 2018–19 | Isthmian Lge SE | 36 | 11 | 4 | 21 | 49 | 72 | 37 | 16/19 | 1Q | T: 1Q | |
| 2019–20 | Isthmian Lge SE | 29† | 8 | 4 | 17 | 31 | 42 | 28 | Aband | 1Q | T: 1Q | |
| 2020–21 | Isthmian Lge SE | 5† | 1 | 1 | 3 | 8 | 12 | 4 | Aband | Pr | T: 3Q | |
| 2021–22 | Isthmian Lge SE | 38 | 15 | 7 | 16 | 47 | 51 | 52 | 10/20 | Pr | T: 2Q | |
| 2022–23 | Isthmian Lge SE | 38 | 13 | 12 | 13 | 50 | 42 | 51 | 11/20 | Pr | T: 2Q | |
| 2023–24 | Isthmian Lge SE | 38 | 22 | 9 | 7 | 82 | 41 | 75 | 3/20 sf:pp-o | EP | T: 2Q | |
| 2024–25 | Isthmian Lge SE | 42 | 31 | 8 | 3 | 117 | 29 | 101 | 2/22 fnl:pp-o | 3Q | T: QF | |
| 2025–26 | Isthmian Lge SE | 42 | 23 | 10 | 9 | 86 | 50 | 79 | 5/22 sf:pp-o | 1Q | T: R2 | |
*1991–92 Southern Lge Sth: six points deducted for fielding two ineligible players
=== Key to contents and abbreviations ===
League: Pld = Played; ◊ = Record incomplete; † = Season not completed; W = Games won; D = Games drawn; L = Games lost; GF = Goals for; GA = Goals against; Pts = Points; Pos = Final position / Teams in division; ◊ = Record incomplete; Aband = Season abandoned; ↑P = promoted; ↓R = relegated; cp-o = Championship Play-off (W=Won, L=Lost); ip-o = Inter-division Play-off (W=Won, L=Lost); pp-o = Promotion Play-off (see 'Other: stages'); FA Cup; FA Trophy; FA Vase: EP = Extra preliminary round; Pr = Preliminary round; 1Q = First qualifying round; 2Q = Second qualifying round; 3Q = Third qualifying round; 4Q = Fourth qualifying round; 5Q = Fifth qualifying round; 6Q = Sixth qualifying round; Q = Qualifying round; R1 = First round proper; R2 = Second round proper; R3 = Third round proper; R4 = Fourth round proper; QF = Quarter-final; Other (Stage: Competition): Stage reached; W = winner; fnl = finalist (runner-up); sf = semi-finalist; Competition; KSC = Kent Senior Cup; KLC = Kent League Cup; ILC = Istmmian League Cup (Alan Turvey Trophy)
