= 1980–81 Kent Football League =

Association football league season

The 1980–81 Kent Football League season was the fifteenth in the history of the Kent Football League, a football competition featuring teams based in and around the county of Kent in England.

The League structure comprised two divisions: Division One and Division Two with the latter known as the Reserves Section (reserves teams were not permitted in Division One). Additionally there were two league cup competitions: the Challenge Cup for the Division One clubs and another for the teams in Division Two.

== Division One ==
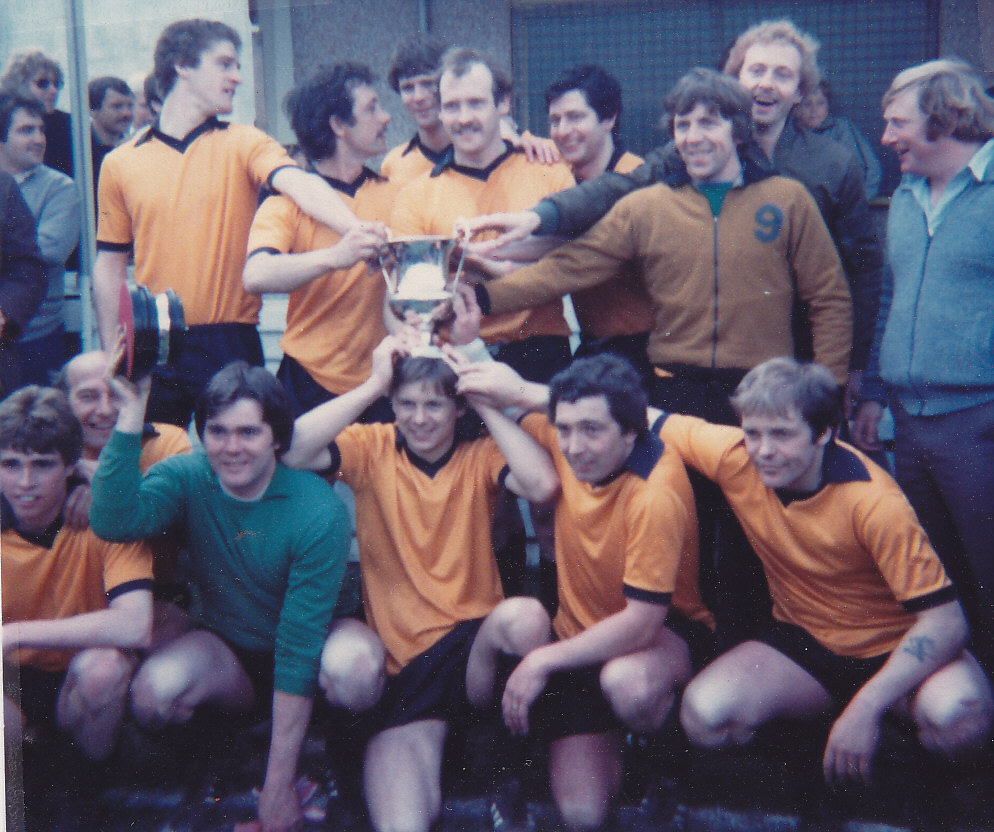
Cray Wanderers celebrate winning the title

Kent Football League Division One
- Season: 1980–81
- Champions: Cray Wanderers
- Matches: 272
- Goals: 826 (3.04 per match)

The division featured the seventeen clubs which had competed in the previous season.

The division was won by Cray Wanderers.

At the end of the season Dartford Glentworth left the league.

=== League table ===
Pos	Team	Pld	W	D	L	GF	GA	GD	Pts	Season End Notes
1	Cray Wanderers	32	24	5	3	92	27	+65	53	
2	Chatham Town	32	22	6	4	61	23	+38	50	
3	Crockenhill	32	20	5	7	63	37	+26	45	
4	Erith & Belvedere	32	19	5	8	57	30	+27	43	
5	Sittingbourne	32	18	5	9	74	29	+45	41	
6	Hythe Town	32	18	5	9	70	45	+25	41	
7	Sheppey United	32	16	9	7	45	33	+12	41	
8	Faversham Town	32	12	11	9	36	28	+8	35	
9	Tunbridge Wells	32	10	9	13	33	49	−16	29	
10	Darenth Heathside	32	9	10	13	45	52	−7	28	
11	Deal Town	32	10	7	15	46	49	−3	27	
12	Dartford Glentworth	32	11	3	18	40	60	−20	25	Resigned
13	Slade Green Athletic	32	10	5	17	39	51	−12	23 (Note: Slade Green Athletic were deducted two points.)	
14	Whitstable Town	32	7	7	18	33	58	−25	21	
15	Kent Police	32	5	9	18	43	67	−24	19	
16	Herne Bay	32	4	6	22	23	67	−44	14	Re-elected
17	Ramsgate	32	2	3	27	26	121	−95	7	Re-elected

Source: "Kent League 1966–92: 1980–81". Non League Matters. "England – Kent League: Final Table Kent League (Division 1) '80–'81". The Rec.Sport.Soccer Statistics Foundation.
Rules for classification: 1) points; 2) goal difference; 3) number of goals scored.

=== Challenge Cup ===
The 1980–81 Kent Football League Challenge Cup was won by Sittingbourne (whose reserves team won their Divisional cup too).

The competition, contested by all seventeen clubs in the Division One, comprised five single match tie rounds (with the first round featuring one tie) culminating in the final which was played on a neutral ground (at Sheppey United F.C. this season).

==== Quarter-finals, Semi-finals and Final ====
Quarter-finals
Hythe Town	1
Darenth Heathside	2
Whitstable Town	5
Faversham Town	1
Erith & Belvedere	4
Crockenhill	2
Deal Town	1
Sittingbourne	2

Semi-finals
Darenth Heathside	1
Whitstable Town	0
Erith & Belvedere	0
Sittingbourne	2

Final
Darenth Heathside	1
Sittingbourne	2

==== Second Round ====
- Sheppey United 1 – 3 Hythe Town
- Darenth Heathside 3 – 0 Herne Bay
- Whitstable Town 1 – 1 Ramsgate
- Replay: Ramsgate 0 – 1 Whitstable Town
- Faversham Town 3 – 2 Kent Police
- Erith & Belvedere 1 – 0 Tunbridge Wells
- Crockenhill 1 – 0 Dartford Glentworth
- Slade Green Athletic 3 – 3 Deal Town
- Replay: Deal Town 5 – 1 Slade Green Athletic
- Sittingbourne 4 – 1 Chatham Town

==== First Round ====
- Darenth Heathside 5 – 2 Cray Wanderers
- Byes for the other fifteen clubs

Sources:

- Final: "County Soccer Details: Results: Saturday: Kent League, Division 1, Cup Final". Kentish Express. 8 May 1981. p. 31 – via British Newspaper Archive.
- Semi-finals: "County Soccer Details: Results: Saturday: Kent League Cup semi-finals". Kentish Express. 6 March 1981. p. 31 – via British Newspaper Archive.
- Quarter-finals: "Results: Kent League Cup". Thanet Times. 16 December 1980. p. 30 – via British Newspaper Archive.;
- Second Round: "Erith Net a Long Shot and Slam the Door". Kent & Sussex Courier. 26 September 1980. p. 34 – via British Newspaper Archive.; "County Soccer Details: Results: Saturday: Kent League, Division 1 Cup, Round 1 (sic)". Kentish Express. 26 September 1980. p. 27 – via British Newspaper Archive.; "County Soccer Details: Results: Tuesday: Kent League Cup 2nd rd replay". Kentish Express. 17 October 1980. p. 27 – via British Newspaper Archive.; "Results: Kent League Cup". Thanet Times. 4 November 1980. p. 31 – via British Newspaper Archive.
- First Round: "County Soccer Details: Results: Saturday: Kent League Division 1: League Cup". Kentish Express. 29 August 1980. p. 27 – via British Newspaper Archive.

== Reserves Section ==
The letter "R" following team names indicates a club's reserves team.

Division Two featured mostly reserves teams (which were not permitted in Division One) from clubs from Kent and the adjacent area whose first team played in Division One and other higher ranked leagues. There was a League Cup competition for the teams in the section.

=== Division Two ===
Kent Football League Division Two
- Season: 1980–81
- Champions: Welling United R

The league featured nineteen clubs including one non-reserve team (Snowdown Colliery Welfare). Fourteen of the teams had competed in the previous season and they were joined by five additional, all reserves, teams:

- Dartford joined from the Kent County Amateur League
- Dartford Glentworth R
- Folkestone R (formerly Folkestone & Shepway R) joined from the Kent County Amateur League
- Maidstone United R joined from the Kent County Amateur League
- Welling United R

Newly joined club Welling United R were the division winners.

At the end of the season Faversham Town R and Dartford Glentworth R resigned from the league.

(The table below is not the final table, maximum potential matches per team = 36)

Pos	Team	Pld	W	D	L	GF	GA	GD	Pts	Season End Notes
1	Welling United R	35	30	2	3	116	26	+90	62	
2	Maidstone United R	34	26	3	5	113	30	+83	55	
3	Dartford R	33	22	3	8	69	34	+35	47	
4	Chatham Town R	32	21	4	7	83	29	+54	46	
5	Erith & Belvedere R	33	19	6	8	63	26	+37	44	
6	Faversham Town R	36	19	1	16	70	66	+4	39	Resigned
7	Folkestone R	36	14	9	13	63	62	+1	37	
8	Darenth Heathside R	35	15	7	13	49	52	−3	37	
9	Sittingbourne R	35	11	13	11	45	41	+4	35	
10	Deal Town R	35	12	10	13	60	70	−10	34	
11	Dover R	35	10	11	14	52	60	−8	31	
12	Sheppey United R	36	12	7	17	55	68	−13	31	
13	Ashford Town R	36	13	5	18	50	76	−26	31	
14	Hythe Town R	35	11	6	18	49	75	−26	28	
15	Dartford Glentworth R	34	8	9	17	51	63	−12	25	Resigned
16	Whitstable Town R	34	10	4	20	41	72	−31	24	
17	Hastings United R	36	9	5	22	36	74	−38	23	
18	Herne Bay R	36	7	4	25	43	110	−67	18	Re-elected
19	Snowdown Colliery Welfare	36	6	3	27	38	112	−74	15	Re-elected

Updated to match(es) played on 5 May 1980. Source: "County Soccer Details: Kent League: Division 2". Kentish Express. 8 May 1981. p. 31 – via British Newspaper Archive.
Rules for classification: 1) points; 2) goal difference; 3) number of goals scored.

=== Division Two Cup ===
The 1980–81 Kent Football League Division Two Cup was won by Sittingbourne R (whose first team won the Challenge Cup) with Chatham Town R runners-up.

The competition was contested by all nineteen clubs in the division and comprised five single match tie rounds (with the first round featuring three ties) culminating in the final.

==== Quarter-finals, Semi-finals and Final ====
Quarter-finals
Faversham Town R	6
Deal Town R	0
Sittingbourne R	3
Sheppey United R	2
Hythe Town R	4
Whitstable Town R	2
Chatham Town R	1
Darenth Heathside R	0

Semi-finals
Faversham Town R	2
Sittingbourne R	4
Hythe Town R	0
Chatham Town R	4

Final
Sittingbourne R
Chatham Town R

==== Second Round ====
- Faversham Town R 5 – 1 Dartford R
- Ashford Town R 2 – 2 Deal Town R
- REPLAY: Deal Town R 4 – 1 Ashford Town R
- Sittingbourne R 1 – 0 Snowdown Colliery Welfare
- Sheppey United R 2 – 1 Maidstone United R
- Hythe Town R v Dover R
- Dartford Glentworth R 0 – 1 Whitstable Town R
- Chatham Town R v Welling United R
- Darenth Heathside R 1 – 1 Erith & Belvedere R
- REPLAY: Erith & Belvedere R 3 – 0 Darenth Heathside R

==== First Round ====
- Faversham Town R 2 – 2 Folkestone R
- REPLAY 1: Folkestone R 1 – 1 (aet) Faversham Town R (score at 90 minutes: 1–1)
- REPLAY 2: Faversham Town R v Folkestone R
- Sittingbourne R 3 – 0 Hastings United R
- Maidstone United R 9 – 0 Herne Bay R
- Byes for the other thirteen clubs

Sources:

- Final: "Reserves Division(s) League Cup". kentleague.com. 2013. Archived from the original on 18 April 2013.
- Semi-finals: "County Soccer Details: Results: Saturday: Kent League: Division 2: League Cup semi-final". Kentish Express. 13 March 1981. p. 23 – via British Newspaper Archive.; "County Soccer Details: Results: Saturday: Kent League: Division 2: League Cup semi-final". Kentish Express. 27 March 1981. p. 30 – via British Newspaper Archive.
- Quarter-finals: "County Soccer Details: Results: Saturday: Kent League: Division 2: League Cup 3rd rnd". Kentish Express. 19 December 1980. p. 23 – via British Newspaper Archive.; "County Soccer Details: Results: Boxing Day: Kent League: League Cup 3rd rnd". Kentish Express. 2 January 1981. p. 23 – via British Newspaper Archive.
- Second Round: "Senior soccer details: Fixtures: Saturday: Kent League: League 2 Cup 2nd rnd". Kent Messenger. 19 September 1980. p. 34 – via British Newspaper Archive.; "Craig can stick with same 12". Whitstable Times. 26 September 1980. p. 13 – via British Newspaper Archive.; "County Soccer Details: Results: Kent League Division 2 Cup rd 2". Kentish Express. 3 October 1980. p. 31 – via British Newspaper Archive.; "County Soccer Details: Results: Monday: Kent League Cup replay". Kentish Express. 3 October 1980. p. 31 – via British Newspaper Archive.; "Senior soccer details: Results: Tuesday: Kent League: League Cup 2nd rnd". Kent Messenger. 10 October 1980. p. 43 – via British Newspaper Archive.; "County Soccer Details: Results: Tuesday: Kent League Division 2 Cup". Kentish Express. 17 October 1980. p. 31 – via British Newspaper Archive.; "County Soccer Details: Results: Saturday: Kent League Division 2 Cup, 2nd rnd replay". Kentish Express. 28 November 1980. p. 31 – via British Newspaper Archive.
- First Round: "Senior soccer details: Results: Saturday: Kent League: Division 2 League Cup". Kent Messenger. 29 August 1980. p. 34 – via British Newspaper Archive.; "Senior soccer details: Results: Saturday: Kent League: League Cup, 1st rnd". Kent Messenger. 5 September 1980. p. 34 – via British Newspaper Archive.; "Senior soccer details: Results: Wednesday: Kent League Division 2: League Cup replay". Kent Messenger. 12 September 1980. p. 42 – via British Newspaper Archive.
