= 1979–80 Kent Football League =

Association football league season

The 1979–80 Kent Football League season was the fourteenth in the history of the Kent Football League, a football competition featuring teams based in and around the county of Kent in England.

The League structure comprised two divisions: Division One and Division Two with the latter known as the Reserves Section (reserves teams were not permitted in Division One). Additionally there were two league cup competitions: the Challenge Cup for the Division One clubs and another for the teams in Division Two.

== Division One ==
Kent Football League Division One
- Season: 1979–80
- Champions: Chatham Town
- Matches: 272
- Goals: 792 (2.91 per match)

The division featured seventeen clubs which had all competed in the previous season.

After five seasons of being named Medway the club reverted its name to Chatham Town.

The division was won by Chatham Town, (their reserves team were also successful and won the Division Two league and cup double).

At the end of the season both bottom clubs, Ramsgate and Kent Police were re-elected to continue their membership of Division One.

=== League table ===
Pos	Team	Pld	W	D	L	GF	GA	GD	Pts	Season End Notes
1	Chatham Town	32	23	7	2	69	22	+47	53	
2	Cray Wanderers	32	20	9	3	80	25	+55	49	
3	Hythe Town	32	19	4	9	57	48	+9	42	
4	Darenth Heathside	32	17	7	8	52	34	+18	41	
5	Sittingbourne	32	15	9	8	49	43	+6	39	
6	Sheppey United	32	14	7	11	51	42	+9	35	
7	Whitstable Town	32	14	7	11	43	37	+6	35	
8	Tunbridge Wells	32	15	5	12	50	53	−3	35	
9	Erith & Belvedere	32	11	12	9	34	29	+5	34	
10	Slade Green Athletic	32	11	5	16	48	57	−9	27	
11	Dartford Glentworth	32	8	10	14	33	48	−15	26	
12	Deal Town	32	7	10	15	33	45	−12	24	
13	Herne Bay	32	8	8	16	34	51	−17	24	
14	Faversham Town	32	7	8	17	40	51	−11	22	
15	Crockenhill	32	7	7	18	51	69	−18	21	
16	Ramsgate	32	6	8	18	30	57	−27	20	Re-elected
17	Kent Police	32	5	7	20	38	81	−43	17	Re-elected

Source: "Kent League Tables: Kent League (Division 1) '79–'80". SCEFL. 7 May 2022., "Kent League 1966–1992: 1979–1980". Non League Matters..
Rules for classification: 1) points; 2) goal difference; 3) number of goals scored.

=== Challenge Cup ===
The 1979–80 Kent Football League Challenge Cup was won by Whitstable Town. The competition, contested by all seventeen clubs in the league, comprised five single match tie rounds (with the first round featuring one tie) culminating in the final which was played on a neutral ground (at Sittingbourne this season).

==== Quarter-finals, Semi-finals and Final ====
Quarter-finals
Chatham Town	3
Ramsgate	0
Herne Bay	0
Sittingbourne	3
Deal Town	0
Whitstable Town	1
Sheppey United	1
Cray Wanderers	0

Semi-finals
Chatham Town	1
Sittingbourne	0
Whitstable Town	2
Sheppey United	0

Final
Chatham Town	3 (Note: After extra time (score at 90 minutes 3–3))
Whitstable Town	4

==== Second Round ====
- Darenth Heathside 1 – 2 Chatham Town
- Ramsgate 1 – 1 Crockenhill
- REPLAY: Crockenhill 0 – 1 Ramsgate
- Herne Bay 4 – 3 Slade Green Athletic
- Sittingbourne 4 – 2 Tunbridge Wells
- Deal Town 3 – 0 Erith & Belvedere
- Hythe Town 2 – 2 Whitstable Town
- REPLAY: Whitstable Town 1 – 0 Hythe Town
- Dartford Glentworth 3 – 3 Sheppey United
- REPLAY: Sheppey United 8 – 1 Dartford Glentworth
- Cray Wanderers 1 – 1 Faversham Town
- REPLAY: Faversham Town 0 – 2 Cray Wanderers

==== First Round ====
- Kent Police 0 – 2 Cray Wanderers
- Byes for the other fifteen clubs

Sources:

- Final: Evans, John (6 May 1980). "Surrender! Chats collapse in amazing finish". Evening Post. p. 24 – via British Newspaper Archive.
- Semi-finals: "Easter Results Round-Up: Saturday: Kent League Cup, semi-finals". Evening Post. 8 April 1980. p. 20 – via British Newspaper Archive.
- Quarter-finals: "Senior soccer details: Results: Tuesday: Kent League Cup 3rd round". Kent Messenger. 15 February 1980. p. 34 – via British Newspaper Archive.; "Results Round-Up: Kent League: League Cup, 3rd rd". Evening Post. 3 March 1980. p. 22 – via British Newspaper Archive.
- Second Round: "Scottish And Other Results: Kent League Cup". Sunday Mirror. 9 December 1979. p. 44 – via British Newspaper Archive.; "Sports Summary: League Cup: Kent League Cup.–Second round replay". Daily Mirror. 12 December 1979. p. 31 – via British Newspaper Archive.; "Results: Kent League Cup". Thanet Times. 18 December 1979. p. 30 – via British Newspaper Archive.; "Senior soccer details: Results: Saturday: Kent League, League Cup, 2nd round replay". Kent Messenger. 28 December 1979. p. 34 – via British Newspaper Archive.
- First Round: "Senior soccer details: Results: Saturday: Kent League, League Cup, 1st round". Kent Messenger. 23 November 1979. p. 38 – via British Newspaper Archive.

== Reserves Section ==
The letter "R" following team names indicates a club's reserves team.

Division Two featured mostly reserves teams (which were not permitted in Division One) from clubs from Kent and the adjacent area whose first team played in Division One and other higher ranked leagues. There was a League Cup competition for the teams in the section.

=== Division Two ===
Kent Football League Division Two
- Season: 1979–80
- Champions: Chatham Town R

The league featured sixteen clubs including one non-reserve team (Snowdown Colliery Welfare). Ten of the teams had competed in the previous season and they were joined by six additional clubs:

- Snowdown Colliery Welfare joined from Division One
- Ashford Town R
- Erith & Belvedere R joined from the Kent County Amateur League
- Hastings United R
- Sheppey United R
- Whitstable Town R

Chatham Town R were the division winners for the second successive season and completed a Division Two league and cup double (additionally the club's first team were winners of Division One).

At the end of the season Cray Wanderers R and Ramsgate R resigned from the league and both bottom clubs, Faversham Town R and Snowdown Colliery Welfare, were re-elected to continue their membership of Division Two.

Pos	Team	Pld	W	D	L	GF	GA	GD	Pts	Season End Notes
1	Chatham Town R	30	26	3	1	90	9	+81	55	
2	Sheppey United R	30	20	5	5	73	34	+39	45	
3	Sittingbourne R	30	18	4	8	63	34	+29	40	
4	Hastings United R	29	17	6	6	63	35	+28	40	
5	Herne Bay R	30	15	8	7	62	38	+24	38	
6	Darenth Heathside R	30	14	7	9	59	39	+20	35	
7	Erith & Belvedere R	29	13	7	9	48	36	+12	33	
8	Cray Wanderers R	28	13	4	11	48	47	+1	30	Resigned
9	Dover R	30	11	5	14	48	57	−9	27	
10	Hythe Town R	29	10	6	13	69	64	+5	26	
11	Deal Town R	30	9	7	14	47	60	−13	25	
12	Ashford Town R	30	7	8	15	40	58	−18	22	
13	Whitstable Town R	30	6	5	19	32	72	−40	17	
14	Ramsgate R	28	4	8	16	29	58	−29	16	Resigned
15	Faversham Town R	29	6	2	21	38	74	−36	14	Re-elected
16	Snowdown Colliery Welfare	30	3	3	24	28	122	−94	9	Re-elected

Updated to match(es) played on 7 May 1980. Source: "County Soccer Details: Kent League: Division 2". Kent Messenger. 9 May 1980. p. 33 – via British Newspaper Archive.
Rules for classification: 1) points; 2) goal difference; 3) number of goals scored.

=== Division Two Cup ===
The 1979–7980 Kent Football League Division Two Cup was contested by all sixteen clubs in the division and comprised four single match tie rounds culminating in the final. Chatham Town R were the winners (part of a Division Two league and cup double) with Deal Town R runners-up.

==== Quarter-finals, Semi-finals and Final ====
Quarter-finals
Sheppey United R	2	2 (Note: Replay, after extra time (score after 90 minutes 0–0))
Hastings United R	2	1
Erith & Belvedere R	0
Chatham Town R	1
Deal Town R	3
Herne Bay R	1
Dover R	0	2 (Note: Replay)
Cray Wanderers R	0	0

Semi-finals
Sheppey United R	0
Chatham Town R	1
Deal Town R	3
Dover R	2

Final
Chatham Town R
Deal Town R

==== First Round ====
- Sheppey United R 2 – 2 Ramsgate R
- REPLAY: Ramsgate R 0 – 3 Sheppey United R
- Whitstable Town R 0 – 3 Hastings United R
- Erith & Belvedere R 1 – 1 Darenth Heathside R
- REPLAY: Darenth Heathside R 1 – 2 Erith & Belvedere R
- Faversham Town R 1 – 1 Chatham Town R
- REPLAY: Chatham Town R v Faversham Town R
- Deal Town R 3 – 0 Snowdown Colliery Welfare
- Herne Bay R 6 – 1 Ashford Town R
- Dover R 4 – 0 Hythe Town R
- Sittingbourne R 1 – 2 Cray Wanderers R

Sources:

- Final: "Reserves Division(s) League Cup". kentleague.com. 2013. Archived from the original on 18 April 2013.
- Semi-finals: "Easter Results Round-Up: Saturday:Division 2, Cup, semi-finals". Evening Post. 8 April 1980. p. 20 – via British Newspaper Archive.
- Quarter-finals: "County soccer details: Results: Saturday: Kent League, Division 2 League Cup, 2nd round". Kentish Express. 29 February 1980. p. 31 – via British Newspaper Archive.; "Results Round-Up: Division 2: League Cup, 2nd rd". Evening Post. 3 March 1980. p. 22 – via British Newspaper Archive.; "County soccer details: Results: Saturday: Kent League, Division 2 League Cup, 2nd round". Kentish Express. 28 March 1980. p. 27 – via British Newspaper Archive.; "County soccer details: Results: Wednesday: Kent League, Division 2 League Cup, 2nd round replay". Kentish Express. 28 March 1980. p. 27 – via British Newspaper Archive.
- First Round: "County soccer details: Results: Saturday: Kent League, Division 2 League Cup". Kentish Express. 5 October 1979. p. 35 – via British Newspaper Archive.; "County soccer details: Results: Saturday: Kent League, Division 2 League Cup, 1st round". Kentish Express. 2 November 1979. p. 35 – via British Newspaper Archive.; "Senior soccer details: Results: Saturday: Kent League, Division 2 League Cup, 1st round". Kent Messenger. 23 November 1979. p. 38 – via British Newspaper Archive.; "County Soccer Details: Results: Saturday: Kent League, Division 2 League Cup 1st round". Kentish Express. 21 December 1979. p. 31 – via British Newspaper Archive.
