= 1981–82 Kent Football League =

Association football league season

The 1981–82 Kent Football League season was the sixteenth in the history of the Kent Football League, a football competition featuring teams based in and around the county of Kent in England.

The League structure comprised two divisions: Division One and Division Two with the latter known as the Reserves Section (reserves teams were not permitted in Division One). Additionally there were two league cup competitions: the Challenge Cup for the Division One clubs and another for the teams in Division Two.

== Division One ==
Kent Football League Division One
- Season: 1981–82
- Champions: Erith & Belvedere
- Promoted: Erith & Belvedere
- Matches: 240
- Goals: 733 (3.05 per match)

The league featured sixteen clubs which had all competed in the previous season.

The league was won by Erith & Belvedere, who left the league following their election to the Southern League.

=== League table ===
Pos	Team	Pld	W	D	L	GF	GA	GD	Pts	Season End Notes
1	Erith & Belvedere	30	17	10	3	45	22	+23	44	Elected to the Southern League Southern Division
2	Sittingbourne	30	16	11	3	63	33	+30	43	
3	Chatham Town	30	18	5	7	61	34	+27	41	
4	Sheppey United	30	16	5	9	60	40	+20	37	
5	Crockenhill	30	11	13	6	54	41	+13	35	
6	Slade Green Athletic	30	11	13	6	45	32	+13	35	
7	Whitstable Town	30	11	12	7	48	37	+11	34	
8	Cray Wanderers	30	13	6	11	51	40	+11	32	
9	Deal Town	30	11	10	9	44	36	+8	32	
10	Ramsgate	30	9	9	12	44	47	−3	27	
11	Hythe Town	30	10	7	13	48	52	−4	27	
12	Darenth Heathside	30	10	4	16	37	50	−13	24	
13	Tunbridge Wells	30	8	6	16	36	58	−22	22	
14	Herne Bay	30	7	6	17	36	63	−27	20	
15	Faversham Town	30	4	8	18	26	50	−24	16	
16	Kent Police	30	2	7	21	35	98	−63	11	

Source: "Kent League 1966–92: 1981–82". Non League Matters. "England – Kent League: Final Table Kent League (Division 1) '81–'82". The Rec.Sport.Soccer Statistics Foundation.
Rules for classification: 1) points; 2) goal difference; 3) number of goals scored.

=== Challenge Cup ===
The 1981–82 Kent Football League Challenge Cup was won by Deal Town.

The competition, contested by all sixteen clubs in the league, comprised four single match tie rounds culminating in the final which was played on a neutral ground (at Sittingbourne F.C. this season).

==== Quarter-finals, Semi-finals and Final ====
Quarter-finals
Slade Green Athletic	2	1 (Note: Replay)
Sittingbourne	2	2
Sheppey United	1
Deal Town	2
Crockenhill	1
Erith & Belvedere	2
Chatham Town	2
Hythe Town	1

Semi-finals
Sittingbourne	2
Deal Town	3
Erith & Belvedere	3
Chatham Town	0

Final
Deal Town	2
Erith & Belvedere	1

==== First Round ====
- Slade Green Athletic 3 – 2 Faversham Town
- Whitstable Town 1 – 1 (aet) Sittingbourne Match abandoned after 105 minutes. (score at 90 minutes 1–1)
- REPLAY: Sittingbourne 4 – 2 (aet) Whitstable Town (score at 90 minutes 2–2)
- Sheppey United 7 – 1 Tunbridge Wells
- Deal Town 1 – 1 Darenth Heathside
- REPLAY: Darenth Heathside 0 – 3 Deal Town
- Crockenhill 2 – 1 Kent Police
- Erith & Belvedere 1 – 0 Ramsgate
- Cray Wanderers 1 – 3 Chatham Town
- Herne Bay 3 – 4 Hythe Town

Sources:

- Final: "Pools Check: Kent League: League Cup Final". Sunday Mirror. 9 May 1982. p. 44 – via British Newspaper Archive.
- Semi-finals: "Results and Tables: Saturday: Kent League; League Cup semi-final". Kentish Express. 26 March 1982. p. 25 – via British Newspaper Archive.; "Results and Tables: Saturday: Kent League; League Cup semi-final". Kentish Express. 2 April 1982. p. 25 – via British Newspaper Archive.
- Quarter-finals: "Results and Tables: Saturday: Kent League Cup 3rd(sic) rnd". Kentish Express. 12 February 1982. p. 21 – via British Newspaper Archive.; "Sports Summary: Soccer: Kent League:: Cup, 3rd(sic) round". Daily Mirror. 10 March 1982. p. 25 – via British Newspaper Archive.
- First Round: "County Soccer Details: Results: Tuesday: Kent League Division 1: League Cup". Kentish Express. 2 October 1981. p. 23 – via British Newspaper Archive.; "County Soccer Details: Results: Saturday: Kent League Division 1, League Cup". Kentish Express. 30 October 1981. p. 27 – via British Newspaper Archive.; "County Soccer Details: Results: Saturday: Kent League Division 1: League Cup 1st rnd". Kentish Express. 27 November 1981. p. 23 – via British Newspaper Archive.; "Injury-time equalizer denies Reds in cup". Whitstable Times. 27 November 1981. p. 14 – via British Newspaper Archive.; "Extra-time goals end Town's cup hopes". Whitstable Times. 4 December 1981. p. 15 – via British Newspaper Archive.; "Results and Tables: Saturday: Kent League Cup 2nd(sic) rnd replay". Kentish Express. 12 February 1982. p. 21 – via British Newspaper Archive.

== Reserves Section ==
The letter "R" following team names indicates a club's reserves team.

Division Two featured mostly reserves teams (which were not permitted in Division One) from clubs from Kent and the adjacent area whose first team played in Division One and other higher ranked leagues. There was a League Cup competition for the teams in the section.

=== Division Two ===
Kent Football League Division Two
- Season: 1981–82
- Champions: Maidstone United R
- Matches: 272
- Goals: 991 (3.64 per match)

The league featured seventeen clubs (including one non-reserve team, Snowdown Colliery Welfare) who had all competed in the division the previous season.

The division was won by Maidstone United R, part of a Division Two league and cup double.

At the end of the season Deal Town R resigned from the league.

==== League table ====
Pos	Team	Pld	W	D	L	GF	GA	GD	Pts	Season End Notes
1	Maidstone United R	32	27	3	2	123	32	+91	57	
2	Dover R	32	18	6	8	55	38	+17	42	
3	Welling United R	32	18	5	9	88	42	+46	41	
4	Chatham Town R	32	17	6	9	69	42	+27	40	
5	Dartford R	32	16	7	9	68	50	+18	39	
6	Sittingbourne R	32	16	6	10	64	45	+19	38	
7	Erith & Belvedere R	32	16	5	11	58	41	+17	37	
8	Hastings United R	32	15	4	13	55	55	0	34	
9	Herne Bay R	32	14	5	13	48	51	−3	33	
10	Sheppey United R	32	14	3	15	60	67	−7	31	
11	Folkestone R	32	11	7	14	66	66	0	29	
12	Darenth Heathside R	32	10	4	18	44	62	−18	24	
13	Hythe Town R	32	10	3	19	42	71	−29	23	
14	Ashford Town R	32	9	4	19	38	55	−17	22	
15	Snowdown Colliery Welfare	32	8	5	19	41	92	−51	21	
16	Whitstable Town R	32	8	4	20	35	76	−41	20	Re-elected
17	Deal Town R	32	5	3	24	37	106	−69	13	Resigned

Source: "Non League Tables for 1981–1982: Kent League Division Two". Non League Matters.
Rules for classification: 1) points; 2) goal difference; 3) number of goals scored.

=== Division Two Cup ===
The 1981–82 Kent Football League Division Two Cup was won by Maidstone United R, part of a Division Two league and cup double.

The competition was contested by all seventeen clubs in the division and comprised five single match tie rounds (with a single tie in the first round) culminating in the final which was played on a neutral ground (at Chatham Town F.C. this season).

==== Quarter-finals, Semi-finals and Final ====
Quarter-finals
Folkestone R	5
Dartford R	3
Sheppey United R	2
Dover R	5
Maidstone United R
Chatham Town R
Welling United R
Winner of Ashford Town R v Hastings United R

Semi-finals
Folkestone R	1
Dover R	3
Maidstone United R
(Quarter-final match 4 winner)

Final
Dover R	1
Maidstone United R	6

==== Second Round ====
- Folkestone R 1 – 0 Erith & Belvedere R
- Dartford R 3– 1 Sittingbourne R
- Sheppey United R 4 – 1 Snowdown Colliery Welfare
- Whitstable Town R 1 – 3 Dover R
- Darenth Heathside R v Maidstone United R
- Chatham Town R 5 – 0 Deal Town R
- Welling United R 3– 2 Herne Bay R
- Ashford Town R v Hastings United R

==== First Round ====
- Hythe Town R 1 – 2 Erith & Belvedere R
- Byes for the other fifteen clubs

Sources:

- Final: "Soccer Results Round-Up: Kent League: Division 2: League Cup Final". Kentish Express. 30 April 1982. p. 35 – via British Newspaper Archive.
- Semi-finals: "Results and Tables: Monday: Kent League Cup Division 2 semi-final". Kentish Express. 19 March 1982. p. 27 – via British Newspaper Archive.
- Quarter-finals: "Results and Tables: Kent League: Division 2: League Cup Round 3". Kentish Express. 5 February 1982. p. 22 – via British Newspaper Archive.; "Your Complete Fixture List: Tomorrow: Soccer: Kent League: Division 2: League Cup". Kentish Express. 22 January 1982. p. 31 – via British Newspaper Archive.
- Second Round: "County Soccer Details: Results: Saturday: Kent League: Division 2: League Cup 2nd rnd". Kentish Express. 9 October 1981. p. 31 – via British Newspaper Archive.; "County Soccer Details: Saturday: Fixtures: Kent League: Division 2: League Cup 2nd rnd". Kentish Express. 9 October 1981. p. 31 – via British Newspaper Archive.; "County Soccer Details: Results: Saturday: Kent League Division 2: League Cup 2nd rnd". Kentish Express. 27 November 1981. p. 23 – via British Newspaper Archive.; "Results and Tables: Kent League: Division 2: League Cup 2nd rd". Kentish Express. 4 December 1981. p. 27 – via British Newspaper Archive.
- First Round: "County Soccer Details: Results: Saturday: Division 2: League Cup 1st rd". Kentish Express. 18 September 1981. p. 27 – via British Newspaper Archive.
