= 1975–76 Kent Football League =

Association football league season

The 1975–76 Kent Football League season was the tenth in the history of the Kent Football League, a football competition featuring teams based in and around the county of Kent in England.

The league comprised one division and there was also a league cup competition, the Challenge Cup.

== League table ==
Kent Football League
- Season: 1975–76
- Champions: Sittingbourne
- Matches played: 342
- Goals scored: 1,265 (3.7 per match)

The league featured teams from nineteen clubs, including seven reserves teams. Eighteen of the clubs competed in the previous season and they were joined by Maidstone United Reserves.

During the latter part of the season, following liquidation and reformation of the club, the Tonbridge Reserves team was renamed Tonbridge AFC Reserves.

The league was won by Sittingbourne, their first league title in the reformed Kent League.

At the end of the season four teams left the league: both the Ashford Town Reserves and Margate Reserves teams were disbanded and resigned; Tonbridge AFC Reserves resigned as their re-election was unlikely as the league was reducing the participation of reserves sides in the division; and Ramsgate Reserves may have suffered a similar fate had they not been replaced by the club's first team.

Pos	Team	Pld	W	D	L	GF	GA	GAv	Pts	Season End Notes
1	Sittingbourne	36	26	5	5	87	38	2.289	57	
2	Dartford Amateurs	36	23	10	3	93	42	2.214	56	
3	Tunbridge Wells	36	23	9	4	100	37	2.703	55	
4	Sheppey United	36	23	9	4	91	44	2.068	55	
5	Deal Town	36	23	4	9	74	29	2.552	50	
6	Medway	36	22	5	9	90	43	2.093	49	
7	Crockenhill	36	20	4	12	84	52	1.615	44	
8	Kent Police	36	15	10	11	80	45	1.778	40	
9	Snowdown Colliery Welfare	36	17	5	14	64	53	1.208	39	
10	Slade Green Athletic	36	15	5	16	51	63	0.810	35	
11	Maidstone United Reserves	36	10	14	12	59	62	0.952	34	
12	Margate Reserves	36	12	6	18	53	79	0.671	30	Resigned (team disbanded)
13	Herne Bay	36	11	7	18	59	72	0.819	29	
14	Whitstable Town	36	10	5	21	61	100	0.610	25	
15	Folkestone & Shepway Reserves	36	10	4	22	50	79	0.633	24	
16	Ashford Town Reserves	36	8	5	23	57	117	0.487	21	Resigned (team disbanded)
17	Dover Reserves	36	4	9	23	36	92	0.391	17	
18	Tonbridge AFC Reserves	36	4	7	25	38	87	0.437	15	Resigned
19	Ramsgate Reserves	36	2	5	29	38	131	0.290	9	Re-elected (replaced by first team)

Source: "Kent League Tables: Kent League '75–'76". SCEFL. 7 May 2022.
Rules for classification: 1) points; 2) goal average.

== Challenge Cup ==
The 1975–76 Kent Football League Challenge Cup was won following a replay by Sheppey United who defeated Sittingbourne in the final with the first match played at Sittingbourne and the second at Sheppey.

The competition, contested by all nineteen clubs in the league, comprised five single match tie rounds culminating in the final.

=== Quarter-finals, Semi-finals and Final ===
Quarter-finals
Tunbridge Wells	0	3 (Note: Replay)
Medway	0	1
Maidstone United Reserves	0
Sittingbourne	1
Slade Green Athletic	1
Sheppey United	4
Folkestone & Shepway Reserves	1
Kent Police	2

Semi-finals
Tunbridge Wells	1	0 (Note: Replay)
Sittingbourne	1	1
Sheppey United	3
Kent Police	2

Final
Sittingbourne	2	2 (Note: Replay)
Sheppey United	2	4

=== Second Round ===
- Ashford Town Reserves 0 – 3 Medway
- Crockenhill 1 – 1 Folkestone & Shepway Reserves
- REPLAY: Folkestone & Shepway Reserves 3 – 0 Crockenhill
- Kent Police 0 – 0 Snowdown Colliery Welfare
- REPLAY: Snowdown Colliery Welfare 1 – 0 Kent Police
- Maidstone United Reserves 5 – 2 Ramsgate Reserves
- Sittingbourne 3 – 1 Deal Town
- Slade Green Athletic 2 – 0 Margate Reserves
- Whitstable Town 1 – 4 Sheppey United
- Tunbridge Wells 3 – 0 Herne Bay

=== First Round ===
- Dover Reserves 3 – 7 Margate Reserves
- Tonbridge AFC Reserves 0 – 1 Deal Town
- Folkestone & Shepway Reserves 2 – 0 Dartford Amateurs
- Byes for the other thirteen clubs

Sources:

- Final: "County Soccer Details: Results: Saturday: Kent League Cup, final". Kentish Express. 14 May 1976. p. 27 – via British Newspaper Archive.; "County Soccer Details: Results: Tuesday: Kent League Cup, final replay". Kentish Express. 14 May 1976. p. 27 – via British Newspaper Archive.
- Semi-finals: "Senior Soccer Details: Results: Saturday: Kent League: League Cup semi-finals". Kent Messenger. 16 April 1976. p. 16 – via British Newspaper Archive.; "Senior Soccer Details: Results: Tuesday: Kent League: Cup semi-final replay". Kent Messenger. 16 April 1976. p. 16 – via British Newspaper Archive.
- Quarter-finals: "Results: Kent League Cup". Thanet Times. 9 March 1976. p. 39 – via British Newspaper Archive.; "Results: Kent League Cup". Thanet Times. 30 March 1976. p. 27 – via British Newspaper Archive.
- Second Round: "Results: Kent League Cup". Thanet Times. 13 January 1976. p. 30 – via British Newspaper Archive.; "Soccer Results: Kent League Cup". Thanet Times. 20 January 1976. p. 22 – via British Newspaper Archive.; "Soccer Results: Kent League Cup". Thanet Times. 27 January 1976. p. 27 – via British Newspaper Archive.
- First Round: "Results: Kent League Cup". Thanet Times. 18 November 1975. p. 30 – via British Newspaper Archive.; "Results: Kent League Cup". Thanet Times. 2 December 1975. p. 28 – via British Newspaper Archive.
