= 1983–84 Kent Football League =

Association football league season

The 1983–84 Kent Football League season was the eighteenth in the history of the Kent Football League, a football competition featuring teams based in and around the county of Kent in England.

The League structure comprised two divisions: Division One and Division Two with the latter known as the Reserves Section (reserves teams were not permitted in Division One). Additionally there were two league cup competitions: the Challenge Cup for the Division One clubs and another for the teams in Division Two.

From this season the league began awarding three points (increased from two) for winning a match.

== Division One ==
Kent Football League Division One
- Season: 1983–84
- Champions: Sittingbourne
- Promoted: Sheppey United
- Matches: 240
- Goals: 774 (3.23 per match)

The league featured sixteen clubs which all competed in the previous season.

The league was won by Sittingbourne, who had previously won the title in 1975–76.

At the end of the season second-placed Sheppey United were promoted to the Southern Football League.

=== League table ===
Pos	Team	Pld	W	D	L	GF	GA	GD	Pts	Season End Notes
1	Sittingbourne	30	24	3	3	87	26	+61	75	
2	Sheppey United	30	21	3	6	61	28	+33	66	Promoted to the Southern League Southern Division
3	Hythe Town	30	17	5	8	63	39	+24	56	
4	Cray Wanderers	30	14	7	9	66	40	+26	49	
5	Tunbridge Wells	30	12	7	11	61	44	+17	43	
6	Crockenhill	30	11	10	9	37	34	+3	43	
7	Herne Bay	30	13	4	13	42	43	−1	43	
8	Beckenham Town	30	12	6	12	56	54	+2	42	
9	Deal Town	30	13	3	14	54	54	0	42	
10	Faversham Town	30	12	6	12	40	41	−1	42	
11	Slade Green Athletic	30	11	4	15	38	52	−14	37	
12	Darenth Heathside	30	9	8	13	44	50	−6	35	
13	Alma Swanley	30	8	10	12	39	50	−11	34	
14	Kent Police	30	8	6	16	27	63	−36	30	
15	Whitstable Town	30	4	9	17	37	62	−25	21	
16	Ramsgate	30	4	3	23	22	94	−72	15	

Source: "Kent League 1966–92: 1983–84". Non League Matters. "England – Kent League: Final Table Kent League (Division 1) '83–'84". The Rec.Sport.Soccer Statistics Foundation.
Rules for classification: 1) points; 2) goal difference; 3) number of goals scored.

=== Challenge Cup ===
The 1983–84 Kent Football League Challenge Cup was won by Cray Wanderers, their first Challenge Cup triumph. The competition, contested by all sixteen clubs in the league, comprised four single match tie rounds culminating in the final.

==== Quarter-finals, Semi-finals and Final ====
Quarter-finals
Cray Wanderers	4
Tunbridge Wells	0
Darenth Heathside	2	3 (Note: Replay)
Slade Green Athletic	2	1
Sittingbourne	2
Herne Bay	0
Sheppey United	5
Deal Town	1

Semi-finals
Cray Wanderers	3 (Note: After extra time)
Darenth Heathside	2
Sittingbourne	2 (Note: After extra time)
Sheppey United	6

Final
Cray Wanderers	4
Sheppey United	3

==== First Round ====
- Ramsgate 0 – 3 Cray Wanderers
- Tunbridge Wells 2 – 1 Crockenhill
- Alma Swanley 1 – 3 Darenth Heathside
- Slade Green Athletic 3 – 2 Kent Police
- Sittingbourne 3 – 1 Whitstable Town
- Hythe Town 1 – 2 Herne Bay
- Sheppey United 4 – 2 Beckenham Town
- Deal Town 3 – 3 Faversham Town
- REPLAY: Faversham Town v Deal Town

Sources:

- Final: "Scottish and Minor Leagues: Kent League Cup Final". The Sunday People. 6 May 1984. p. 40 – via British Newspaper Archive.
- Semi-finals: "Scottish and Minor Leagues: Kent: League Cup semi-finals". The Sunday People. 11 March 1984. p. 40 – via British Newspaper Archive.
- Quarter-finals: "Results Round-up: Kent League: League Cup". Sunday Mirror. 13 November 1983. p. 40 – via British Newspaper Archive.; "Results Round-up: Kent League: League Cup". Sunday Mirror. 26 February 1984. p. 40 – via British Newspaper Archive.
- First Round: "(Scottish Results): Kent League Cup". Sunday Mirror. 25 September 1983. p. 40 – via British Newspaper Archive.; "Cup Shock". Whitstable Times. 30 September 1983. p. 14 – via British Newspaper Archive.

== Reserves Section ==
The letter "R" following team names indicates a club's reserves team.

Division Two featured mostly reserves teams (which were not permitted in Division One) from clubs from Kent and the adjacent area whose first team played in Division One and other higher ranked leagues. There was a League Cup competition for the teams in the section.

=== Division Two ===
Kent Football League Division Two
- Season: 1983–84
- Champions: Fisher Athletic R
- Matches: 210
- Goals: 700 (3.33 per match)

The league featured fifteen clubs (including one non-reserve team, Snowdown Colliery Welfare), fourteen of which had competed in the division the previous season together with Fisher Athletic R.

The division was won by Fisher Athletic R in their first season in the division.

At the end of the season Beckenham Town R and Dover R left the league.

==== League Table ====
Pos	Team	Pld	W	D	L	GF	GA	GD	Pts	Season End Notes
1	Fisher Athletic R	28	19	5	4	82	23	+59	62	
2	Sittingbourne R	28	19	2	7	66	38	+28	59	
3	Chatham Town R	28	13	8	7	49	31	+18	47	
4	Hythe Town R	28	14	4	10	67	44	+23	46	
5	Beckenham Town R	28	13	5	10	43	30	+13	44	Resigned
6	Hastings United R	28	13	5	10	48	46	+2	44	
7	Erith & Belvedere R	28	13	4	11	48	34	+14	43	
8	Ashford Town R	28	13	4	11	40	35	+5	43	
9	Darenth Heathside R	28	10	8	10	36	39	−3	38	
10	Faversham Town R	28	10	6	12	52	57	−5	36	
11	Snowdown Colliery Welfare	28	9	7	12	35	44	−9	34	
12	Dover R	28	9	5	14	37	46	−9	32	Resigned
13	Folkestone R	28	9	3	16	41	56	−15	30	
14	Herne Bay R	28	6	4	18	29	77	−48	22	
15	Whitstable Town R	28	3	4	21	27	100	−73	13	

Source: "Non League Tables for 1983–1984: Kent League Division 1(sic)". Non League Matters.
Rules for classification: 1) points; 2) goal difference; 3) number of goals scored.

=== Division Two Cup ===
The 1983–84 Kent Football League Division Two Cup was won for a second successive season by Erith & Belvedere R who defeated Darenth Heatside in the final.
