= 1985–86 Kent Football League =

Association football league season

The 1985–86 Kent Football League season (known as the Winstonlead Kent League for sponsorship reasons) was the twentieth in the history of the Kent Football League, a football competition featuring teams based in and around the county of Kent in England.

The League structure comprised two divisions: Division One and Division Two with the latter known as the Reserves Section (reserves teams were not permitted in Division One). Additionally there were two league cup competitions: the Challenge Cup for the Division One clubs and another for the teams in Division Two.

== Division One ==
Kent Football League Division One
- Season: 1985–86
- Champions: Alma Swanley
- Matches: 306
- Goals: 923 (3.02 per match)

The league featured eighteen clubs, seventeen of which competed in the previous season together with one additional club:

- Thames Polytechnic, transferred from the London Spartan League

The league was won, for the only time in their history, by Alma Swanley.

At the end of the season both bottom clubs, Slade Green Athletic and Deal Town were re-elected to continue their membership of the division.

=== League table ===
Pos	Team	Pld	W	D	L	GF	GA	GD	Pts	Season End Notes
1	Alma Swanley	34	22	9	3	78	39	+39	75	
2	Sittingbourne	34	21	7	6	76	37	+39	70	
3	Crockenhill	34	21	5	8	68	33	+35	68	
4	Darenth Heathside	34	17	11	6	57	32	+25	62	
5	Tunbridge Wells	34	15	13	6	99	58	+41	58	
6	Faversham Town	34	16	6	12	53	50	+3	54	
7	Greenwich Borough	34	13	10	11	51	54	−3	49	
8	Ramsgate	34	12	8	14	50	53	−3	44	
9	Kent Police	34	12	7	15	53	61	−8	43	
10	Thames Polytechnic	34	11	9	14	36	49	−13	42	
11	Herne Bay	34	12	6	16	34	52	−18	42	
12	Hythe Town	34	11	7	16	50	59	−9	40	
13	Metropolitan Police (Hayes)	34	12	4	18	54	63	−9	40	
14	Cray Wanderers	34	9	12	13	34	51	−17	39	
15	Beckenham Town	34	10	7	17	43	64	−21	37	
16	Whitstable Town	34	9	9	16	37	52	−15	36	
17	Slade Green Athletic	34	5	10	19	14	42	−28	25	Re-elected
18	Deal Town	34	6	4	24	36	74	−38	22	Re-elected

Source: "Kent League 1966–92: 1985–86". Non League Matters., "England – Kent League: Final Table Kent League (Division 1) '85–'86". The Rec.Sport.Soccer Statistics Foundation.
Rules for classification: 1) points; 2) goal difference; 3) number of goals scored.

=== Challenge Cup ===
The 1985–86 Kent Football League Challenge Cup was won by Tunbridge Wells, their third win following two occasions during the 1970s.

The competition, contested by all eighteen clubs in Division One, comprised five single match tie rounds (with the first round featuring two ties) culminating in the final which was played on a neutral ground (at Sittingbourne F.C. this season).

==== Quarter-finals, Semi-finals and Final ====
Quarter-finals
Whitstable Town	0
Sittingbourne	2
Darenth Heathside	2 (Note: After extra time)	2 (Note: 1st Replay, after extra time)	2 (Note: 2nd Replay)
Deal Town	2	2	1
Tunbridge Wells	5
Herne Bay	2
Alma Swanley	0
Crockenhill	2

Semi-finals
Sittingbourne	2
Darenth Heathside	3
Tunbridge Wells	3
Crockenhill	1

Final
Darenth Heathside	0
Tunbridge Wells	1

==== Second Round ====
- Whitstable Town 2 – 1 (aet) Greenwich Borough (score at 90 minutes: 1 –1)
- Sittingbourne 2 – 1 (aet) Faversham Town
- Beckenham Town 1 – 5 Darenth Heathside
- Deal Town 3 – 0 Metropolitan Police (Hayes)
- Slade Green Athletic 0 – 2 Tunbridge Wells
- Thames Polytechnic 0– 1 Herne Bay
- Ramsgate 2 – 5 (aet) Alma Swanley
- Hythe Town 1 – 2 Crockenhill

==== First Round ====
- Cray Wanderers 2 – 2 (aet) Metropolitan Police (Hayes)
- Replay 1: Metropolitan Police (Hayes) 3 – 3 (aet) Cray Wanderers
- Replay 2: Metropolitan Police (Hayes) 1 – 1 (aet) Cray Wanderers; Metropolitan Police (Hayes) won 4–3 on penalties
- Kent Police 0 – 1 Hythe Town

Sources:

- Final: "Gazette Soccer: Results: Saturday: Winstonlead Kent League: Division 1 Cup final". Kentish Gazette. 9 May 1986. p. 61 – via British Newspaper Archive.
- Semi-finals: "Kent League". Dover Express. 18 April 1986. p. 55 – via British Newspaper Archive.
- Quarter-finals: "Sport yields to icy blast". Kentish Gazette. 14 February 1986. p. 64 – via British Newspaper Archive.; "Gazette Soccer: Results: Saturday: Winstonlead Kent League: Division 1 Cup, third round". Kentish Gazette. 21 March 1986. p. 62 – via British Newspaper Archive.; "Gazette Soccer: Results: Tuesday: Winstonlead Kent League: Division 1 Cup, third round replay". Kentish Gazette. 27 March 1986. p. 71 – via British Newspaper Archive.; "Gazette Soccer: Results: Saturday: Winstonlead Kent League: Division 1 Cup, third round". Kentish Gazette. 4 April 1986. p. 62 – via British Newspaper Archive.; "Gazette Soccer: Results: Saturday: Winstonlead Kent League: Division 1 Cup, third round second replay". Kentish Gazette. 11 April 1986. p. 63 – via British Newspaper Archive.
- Second Round:"Soccer Fixtures and Results: Results: Saturday: Winstonlead Kent League: League Cup, Round 2". Kentish Express. 18 October 1985. p. 53 – via British Newspaper Archive.; "Town in search of league points: Winstonlead League Cup second round". Whitstable Times. 14 November 1985. p. 17 – via British Newspaper Archive.; "Senior soccer details: Results: Saturday: Winstonlead Cup 2nd rd". Kent Messenger. 17 January 1986. p. 79 – via British Newspaper Archive.
- First Round: "Soccer Fixtures and Results: Results: Saturday: Winstonlead Kent League: League Cup, Round 1". Kentish Express. 4 October 1985. p. 52 – via British Newspaper Archive.; "Soccer Fixtures and Results: Results: Saturday: Winstonlead Kent League: League Cup, Round 1". Kentish Express. 11 October 1985. p. 53 – via British Newspaper Archive.; "Soccer Fixtures and Results: Results: Saturday: Winstonlead Kent League: League Cup, 1st round replay". Kentish Express. 18 October 1985. p. 53 – via British Newspaper Archive.; "Town in search of league points: Winstonlead League Cup 1st round replay". Whitstable Times. 14 November 1985. p. 17 – via British Newspaper Archive.

== Reserves Section ==
The letter "R" following team names indicates a club's reserves team.

Division Two featured mostly reserves teams (which were not permitted in Division One) from clubs from Kent and the adjacent area whose first team played in Division One and other higher ranked leagues. There was a League Cup competition for the teams in the section.

=== Division Two ===
Kent Football League Division Two
- Season: 1985–86
- Champions: Fisher Athletic R
- Matches: 306
- Goals: 1,015 (3.32 per match)

The league featured eighteen clubs (including one non-reserve team, Snowdown Colliery Welfare), sixteen of which had competed in the division the previous season together with two additional clubs

- Dover Athletic R
- Thames Polytechnic R

The division was won for the second occasion in three seasons by Fisher Athletic R who pipped Sheppey United R to the top position by goal difference only.

After the end of the season both Canterbury City R and Chatham Town R resigned from the division.

==== League Table ====
Pos	Team	Pld	W	D	L	GF	GA	GD	Pts	Season End Notes
1	Fisher Athletic R	34	25	5	4	95	34	+61	80	
2	Sheppey United R	34	25	5	4	76	30	+46	80	
3	Sittingbourne R	34	20	7	7	75	38	+37	67	
4	Ashford Town R	34	19	5	10	53	44	+9	62	
5	Faversham Town R	34	16	7	11	67	52	+15	55	
6	Thames Polytechnic R	34	15	7	12	58	55	+3	52	
7	Snowdown Colliery Welfare	34	15	5	14	51	45	+6	50	
8	Folkestone R	34	13	9	12	49	48	+1	48	
9	Darenth Heathside R	34	12	11	11	63	54	+9	47	
10	Thanet United R	34	13	8	13	54	54	0	47	
11	Erith & Belvedere R	34	13	7	14	58	52	+6	46	
12	Dover Athletic R	34	14	4	16	58	56	+2	46	
13	Hythe Town R	34	14	4	16	63	61	+2	46	
14	Deal Town R	34	8	11	15	42	61	−19	35	
15	Canterbury City R	34	9	7	18	49	71	−22	34	Resigned
16	Herne Bay R	34	6	8	20	33	67	−34	26	
17	Whitstable Town R	34	5	8	21	32	86	−54	23	
18	Chatham Town R	34	4	2	28	39	107	−68	14	Resigned

Source: "Non League Tables for 1985–1986: Kent League Division Two". Non League Matters.
Rules for classification: 1) points; 2) goal difference; 3) number of goals scored.

=== Division Two Cup ===
The 1985–86 Kent Football League Division Two Cup was won by Faversham Town R.

The competition, contested by all eighteen clubs in the division, comprised five single match tie rounds (with the first round featuring two ties) culminating in the final which was played on a neutral ground (at Ramsgate F.C. this season).

==== Quarter-finals, Semi-finals and Final ====
Quarter-finals
Sheppey United R	3
Fisher Athletic R	1
Deal Town R	2
Thanet United R	1
Erith & Belvedere R
Herne Bay R
Faversham Town R	5
Chatham Town R	0

Semi-finals
Sheppey United R	1 (Note: After extra time, score at 90 minutes 0–0)
Deal Town R	2
Erith & Belvedere R	0
Faversham Town R	2

Final
Deal Town R	0
Faversham Town R	2

==== Second Round ====
- Sheppey United R 3 – 0 Ashford Town R
- Thames Polytechnic R 0 – 1 Fisher Athletic R
- Canterbury City R 0 – 5 Deal Town R
- Snowdown Colliery Welfare 1 – 3 Thanet United R
- Sittingbourne R 0 – 1 Erith & Belvedere R
- Herne Bay R 2 – 1 Darenth Heathside R
- Whitstable Town R 1– 3 (aet) Faversham Town R
- Dover Athletic R 1 – 2 Chatham Town R

==== First Round ====
- Herne Bay R 1 – 0 Folkestone R
- Chatham Town R 2 – 1 Hythe Town R

Sources:

- Final: "Gazette Soccer: Results: Wednesday: Winstonlead Kent League: Division 2 Cup Final". Kentish Gazette. 16 May 1986. p. 61 – via British Newspaper Archive.
- Semi-finals: "Gazette Soccer: Results: Saturday: Winstonlead Kent League: Division 2 Cup, semi-finals". Kentish Gazette. 11 April 1986. p. 63 – via British Newspaper Archive.
- Quarter-finals: "Gazette Soccer: Results: Saturday: Winstonlead Kent League: Division 2 Cup, third round". Kentish Gazette. 7 February 1986. p. 63 – via British Newspaper Archive.; "Gazette Soccer: Results: Saturday: Winstonlead Kent League: Division 2 Cup, third round". Kentish Gazette. 21 March 1986. p. 62 – via British Newspaper Archive.; "Winstonlead Kent League: Results: League Cup 3rd round". Faversham News. 21 March 1986. p. 35 – via British Newspaper Archive.
- Second Round:"Results: Saturday: Winstonlead Kent League: Division 2: League Cup, Round 2". Kentish Express. 8 November 1985. p. 53 – via British Newspaper Archive.; "Soccer Fixtures and Results: Results: Saturday: Winstonlead Kent League: League Cup, Round 2". Kentish Express. 15 November 1985. p. 53 – via British Newspaper Archive.; "Soccer Fixtures and Results: Results: Saturday: Winstonlead Kent League: League Cup, Round 2". Kentish Express. 6 December 1985. p. 45 – via British Newspaper Archive.; "Gazette Soccer: Results: Saturday: Kent League: Division 2 Cup, second round". Kentish Gazette. 3 January 1986. p. 55 – via British Newspaper Archive.
- First Round: "Results: Saturday: Winstonlead Kent League: Division 2: League Cup, Round 1". Kentish Express. 1 November 1985. p. 45 – via British Newspaper Archive.; "Soccer Fixtures and Results: Results: Saturday: Winstonlead Kent League: League Cup, Round 1". Kentish Express. 15 November 1985. p. 53 – via British Newspaper Archive.
