= 1972–73 Kent Football League =

Association football league season

The 1972–73 Kent Football League season was the seventh in the history of the Kent Football League, a football competition featuring teams based in and around the county of Kent in England.

The league comprised one division and there was also a league cup competition, the Challenge Cup.

== League table ==
Kent Football League
- Season: 1972–73
- Champions: Sheppey United
- Matches played: 378
- Goals scored: 1,379 (3.65 per match)

The league featured teams from twenty clubs, including eight reserves teams. Eighteen of the clubs had competed in the league the previous season and they were joined by two additional clubs:

- Snowdown Colliery Welfare returning to the league following a one-season absence.
- Sheppey United joined from the Metropolitan–London League and replaced their reserves team.

The Ramsgate Athletic Reserves team from the previous season were renamed Ramsgate Reserves.

The league was won by Sheppey United.

At the end of the season Brett Sports folded and together with Hastings United Reserves left the league. Both bottom clubs, Ashford Town Reserves and Margate Reserves, were re-elected to continue their membership of the league.

Pos	Team	Pld	W	D	L	GF	GA	GAv	Pts	Season End Notes
1	Sheppey United	38	31	5	2	127	33	3.848	67	
2	Sittingbourne	38	26	6	6	108	37	2.919	58	
3	Chatham Town	38	24	5	9	92	47	1.957	53	
4	Brett Sports	38	22	6	10	98	61	1.607	50	Resigned from the league (folded)
5	Kent Police (Note: Matches versus Ramsgate Reserves and Whitstable Town not played.)	36	22	6	8	76	41	1.854	46 (Note: Kent Police were deducted four points.)	
6	Dover Reserves	38	19	9	10	64	35	1.829	40 (Note: Dover Reserves were deducted seven points for playing ineligible players)	
7	Tonbridge Reserves	38	16	8	14	71	67	1.060	40	
8	Tunbridge Wells	38	17	5	16	88	68	1.294	39	
9	Bexley United Reserves	38	15	7	16	59	57	1.035	37	
10	Dartford Amateurs	38	16	5	17	65	71	0.915	37	
11	Deal Town	38	16	5	17	65	69	0.942	35 (Note: Deal Town were deducted two points for playing ineligible players)	
12	Folkestone Reserves	38	14	6	18	65	92	0.707	34	
13	Whitstable Town (Note: Match versus Kent Police not played.)	37	11	9	17	50	83	0.602	33 (Note: Whitstable Town had two points added.)	
14	Crockenhill	38	14	4	20	67	94	0.713	32	
15	Ramsgate Reserves	37	10	9	18	49	69	0.710	31 (Note: Ramsgate Reserves had two points added.)	
16	Snowdown Colliery Welfare	38	11	7	20	44	71	0.620	29	
17	Slade Green Athletic	38	9	10	19	55	77	0.714	28	
18	Hastings United Reserves	38	9	5	24	53	97	0.546	23	Resigned from the league
19	Ashford Town Reserves	38	6	10	22	42	113	0.372	22	Re-elected
20	Margate Reserves	38	4	5	29	41	97	0.423	13	Re-elected

Source: "Final Kent League Table". Sheerness Times Guardian. 15 June 1973. p. 8 – via British Newspaper Archive. with further points additions/deductions per "Kent League Tables: Kent League '72–'73". SCEFL. 7 May 2022.
Rules for classification: 1) points; 2) goal average.

== Challenge Cup ==
The 1972–73 Kent Football League Challenge Cup was won by Folkestone Reserves – the final occasion it was won by a reserves team.

The competition, contested by all twenty clubs in the league, comprised five single match tie rounds culminating in the final between Sittingbourne and Folkestone Reserves and played at the former's home ground, the Bull Ground.

=== Quarter-finals, Semi-finals and Final ===
Quarter-finals
Ramsgate Reserves	0
Sittingbourne	3
Tonbridge Reserves	1	0 (Note: Replay)
Dartford Amateurs	1	5
Sheppey United	2
Tunbridge Wells	3
Folkestone Reserves	3
Deal Town	2

Semi-finals
Sittingbourne	2
Dartford Amateurs	0
Tunbridge Wells	2
Folkestone Reserves	3

Final
Sittingbourne	1
Folkestone Reserves	2

=== Second Round ===
- Ashford Town Reserves 0 – 2 Ramsgate Reserves
- Sittingbourne 3 – 1 Chatham Town
- Brett Sports 0 – 2 Tonbridge Reserves
- Whitstable Town 2 – 4 Dartford Amateurs
- Sheppey United 2 – 1 Kent Police
- Tunbridge Wells 3 – 1 Slade Green Athletic
- Margate Reserves 1 – 1 Folkestone Reserves
- REPLAY: Folkestone Reserves 2 – 0 Margate Reserves
- Crockenhill 1 – 6 Deal Town

=== First Round ===
- Chatham Town 1 – 0 Bexley United Reserves
- Whitstable Town 2 – 0 Hastings United Reserves
- Dover Reserves 0 – 0 Kent Police
- REPLAY: Kent Police 3 – 2 Dover Reserves
- Margate Reserves 4 – 1 Snowdown Colliery Welfare
- Byes for the other twelve clubs

Sources:

- Final: "Results Round-up: Kent League: Cup Final". Sunday Mirror. 13 May 1973. p. 45 – via British Newspaper Archive.
- Semi-finals: "Kent League: Results:League Cup Semi-Finals". Whitstable Times. 13 April 1973. p. 2 – via British Newspaper Archive.
- Quarter-finals: "County Details: Results: Saturday: Kent League, League Cup quarter-finals". Kentish Express. 23 March 1973. p. 14 – via British Newspaper Archive.; "Results: Kent League Cup". Thanet Times. 3 April 1973. p. 20 – via British Newspaper Archive.
- Second Round: "Football Results: Monday: Kent League Cup". East Kent Times. 3 January 1973. p. 14 – via British Newspaper Archive.; "County Details: Results: Saturday: Kent League. League Cup 2nd round". Kent Messenger. 12 January 1973. p. 16 – via British Newspaper Archive.; "County Details: Results: Monday: Kent League Cup 2nd round replay". Kent Messenger. 19 January 1973. p. 16 – via British Newspaper Archive.
- First Round: "Greyhounds and Sports Summary: Soccer: Kent League: League Cup-1st Rd". Daily Mirror. 9 November 1972. p. 31 – via British Newspaper Archive.; "County Details: Results: Friday: Kent League Cup 1st round & Saturday: Kent League Cup 1st round". Kent Messenger. 10 November 1972. p. 15 – via British Newspaper Archive.; "County Details: Results: Saturday: Kent League Cup 1st round replay". Kentish Express. 15 December 1972. p. 12 – via British Newspaper Archive.
