= 1986–87 Kent Football League =

Association football league season

The 1986–87 Kent Football League season (known as the Winstonlead Kent League for sponsorship reasons) was the twenty-first in the history of the Kent Football League, a football competition featuring teams based in and around the county of Kent in England.

The League structure comprised two divisions: Division One and Division Two with the latter known as the Reserves Section (reserves teams were not permitted in Division One). Additionally there were two league cup competitions: the Challenge Cup for the Division One clubs and another for the teams in Division Two.

== Division One ==
Kent Football League Division One
- Season: 1986–87
- Champions: Greenwich Borough
- Matches: 306
- Goals: 987 (3.23 per match)

The league featured eighteen clubs, which had all competed in the previous season.

Slade Green Athletic changed their name to Slade Green.

The league was won by Greenwich Borough, part of a league and cup double.

At the end of the season both bottom clubs, Faversham Town and Kent Police, were re-elected to continue their membership of the division.

=== League table ===
Pos	Team	Pld	W	D	L	GF	GA	GD	Pts	Season End Notes
1	Greenwich Borough	34	24	6	4	113	36	+77	78	
2	Crockenhill	34	22	9	3	63	31	+32	75	
3	Alma Swanley	34	20	7	7	69	34	+35	67	
4	Ramsgate	34	18	8	8	59	42	+17	62	
5	Herne Bay	34	17	9	8	76	58	+18	60	
6	Sittingbourne	34	17	8	9	60	43	+17	59	
7	Tunbridge Wells	34	14	8	12	56	45	+11	50	
8	Whitstable Town	34	14	8	12	45	47	−2	50	
9	Darenth Heathside	34	13	7	14	53	50	+3	46	
10	Cray Wanderers	34	12	8	14	56	48	+8	44	
11	Hythe Town	34	11	11	12	51	48	+3	44	
12	Slade Green	34	12	6	16	50	51	−1	42	
13	Thames Polytechnic	34	9	6	19	48	72	−24	33	
14	Metropolitan Police (Hayes)	34	9	6	19	37	73	−36	33	
15	Beckenham Town	34	7	10	17	37	61	−24	31	
16	Deal Town	34	8	7	19	45	73	−28	31	
17	Faversham Town (Note: Faversham Town were deducted one point and one goal for fielding an ineligible player - the deducted goal has been reinstated in the table.)	34	7	11	16	32	67	−35	31 (Note: Faversham Town were deducted one point.)	Re-elected
18	Kent Police	34	4	1	29	37	108	−71	13	Re-elected

Source: "Kent League 1966–92: 1986–87". Non League Matters., "England – Kent League: Final Table Kent League (Division 1) '86–'87". The Rec.Sport.Soccer Statistics Foundation.
Rules for classification: 1) points; 2) goal difference; 3) number of goals scored.

=== Challenge Cup ===
The 1986–87 Kent Football League Challenge Cup was won, for the second occasion in three seasons, by Greenwich Borough and was part of a league and cup double.

The competition, contested by all eighteen clubs in Division One, comprised five single match tie rounds (with the first round featuring two ties) culminating in the final which was played on a neutral ground (the initial tie was at Tunbridge Wells F.C. this season).

==== Quarter-finals, Semi-finals and Final ====
Quarter-finals
Faversham Town	1
Ramsgate	2
Metropolitan Police (Hayes)	0
Greenwich Borough	1
Sittingbourne	5
Darenth Heathside	3
Deal Town	0
Herne Bay	1

Semi-finals
Ramsgate	2
Greenwich Borough	3
Sittingbourne	3
Herne Bay	0

Final
Greenwich Borough	1 (Note: After extra time (score at 90 minutes: 0–0))	3 (Note: Replay)
Sittingbourne	1	1

==== Second Round ====
- Faversham Town 1 – 0 Alma Swanley
- Ramsgate 2 – 1 Slade Green
- Metropolitan Police (Hayes) 2 – 1 Tunbridge Wells
- Crockenhill 1 – 2 Greenwich Borough
- Cray Wanderers 2 – 5 Sittingbourne
- Darenth Heathside 3 – 0 Hythe Town
- Deal Town 3 – 0 Kent Police
- Herne Bay 3– 1 Thames Polytechnic

==== First Round ====
- Whitstable Town 0 – 2 Deal Town
- Beckenham Town 1 – 3 Herne Bay

Sources:

- Final:"Results: Saturday: Winstonlead Kent League: League Cup final". Kentish Express. 7 May 1987. p. 46 – via British Newspaper Archive.; "Brave Bourne go down in controversial final". East Kent Gazette. 14 May 1987. p. 36 – via British Newspaper Archive.
- Semi-finals: "Soccer Results, Fixtures, Tables: Results: Saturday: Winstonlead Kent League: Division 1: League Cup, semi-finals". Kentish Express. 9 April 1987. p. 53 – via British Newspaper Archive.
- Quarter-finals: "Soccer Results And Fixtures: Results: Saturday: Winstonlead Kent League: Division 1: League Cup, Round 3". Kentish Express. 12 February 1987. p. 53 – via British Newspaper Archive.; "Soccer Results And Fixtures: Results: Saturday: Winstonlead Kent League: Division 1: League Cup, Round 3". Kentish Express. 12 March 1987. p. 55 – via British Newspaper Archive.
- Second Round:"Soccer Results And Fixtures: Results: Saturday: Winstonlead Kent League: Division 1 Cup, Round 2". Kentish Express. 20 November 1986. p. 55 – via British Newspaper Archive.
- First Round: "Results, fixtures, tables: Results: Saturday: Winstonlead Kent League: Division 1 Cup, first round". Kentish Gazette. 10 October 1986. p. 71 – via British Newspaper Archive.

== Reserves Section ==
The letter "R" following team names indicates a club's reserves team.

Division Two featured mostly reserves teams (which were not permitted in Division One) from clubs from Kent and the adjacent area whose first team played in Division One and other higher ranked leagues. There was a League Cup competition for the teams in the section.

=== Division Two ===
Kent Football League Division Two
- Season: 1986–87
- Champions: Fisher Athletic R
- Matches: 306
- Goals: 1,124 (3.67 per match)

The league featured eighteen clubs (including one non-reserve team, Snowdown Colliery Welfare), sixteen of which had competed in the division the previous season together with two additional clubs

- Hastings Town R
- Ramsgate R, joined from the Kent County League

The division was won for the second successive season (and the third time in four seasons) by Fisher Athletic R.

At the end of the season Erith & Belvedere R withdrew from the division and both bottom clubs, Faversham Town R and Whitstable Town R, were re-elected to continue their membership of the division.

==== League Table ====
Pos	Team	Pld	W	D	L	GF	GA	GD	Pts	Season End Notes
1	Fisher Athletic R (Note: Fisher Athletic R were deducted three points and ten goals for fielding an ineligible player - the deducted goals have been reinstated in the table.)	34	26	4	4	112	29	+83	79 (Note: Fisher Athletic R were deducted three points.)	
2	Sittingbourne R	34	22	7	5	75	33	+42	73	
3	Erith & Belvedere R	34	16	13	5	72	49	+23	61	Resigned
4	Ashford Town R	34	18	7	9	64	43	+21	61	
5	Snowdown Colliery Welfare	34	17	5	12	55	51	+4	56	
6	Hastings Town R	34	15	7	12	79	62	+17	52	
7	Dover Athletic R (Note: Dover Athletic R were deducted one point and one goal for fielding an ineligible player - the deducted goal has been reinstated in the table.)	34	14	9	11	73	56	+17	50 (Note: Dover Athletic R were deducted one point.)	
8	Folkestone R	34	16	3	15	56	60	−4	51	
9	Thanet United R	34	12	10	12	72	69	+3	46	
10	Herne Bay R	34	13	7	14	51	57	−6	46	
11	Ramsgate R	34	13	5	16	56	62	−6	44	
12	Darenth Heathside R	34	11	11	12	52	64	−12	44	
13	Thames Polytechnic R	34	12	7	15	62	76	−14	43	
14	Sheppey United R (Note: Sheppey United R were deducted three points and one goal for fielding an ineligible player - the deducted goal has been reinstated in the table.)	34	11	8	15	63	62	+1	38 (Note: Sheppey United R were deducted three points.)	
15	Hythe Town R	34	9	4	21	48	71	−23	31	
16	Deal Town R	34	8	5	21	53	98	−45	29	
17	Faversham Town R	34	6	7	21	49	97	−48	25	Re-elected
18	Whitstable Town R	34	5	5	24	32	85	−53	20	Re-elected

Source: "Non League Tables for 1986–1987: Kent League Division Two". Non League Matters. (Note: The source table is net of the goal deductions to Fisher Athletic R, Dover Athletic R and Sheppey United R).
Rules for classification: 1) points; 2) goal difference; 3) number of goals scored.

=== Division Two Cup ===
The 1986–87 Kent Football League Division Two Cup was won by Sittingbourne R.

The competition, contested by all eighteen clubs in the division, comprised five single match tie rounds (with the first round featuring two ties) culminating in the final which was played on a neutral ground (at Ramsgate F.C. this season).

==== Quarter-finals, Semi-finals and Final ====
Quarter-finals
Erith & Belvedere R	7
Dover Athletic R	1
Ashford Town R	3
Fisher Athletic R	2
Darenth Heathside R	3
Thanet United R	1
Sittingbourne R	2
Thames Polytechnic R	1

Semi-finals
Erith & Belvedere R	1 (Note: After extra time)
Ashford Town R	2
Darenth Heathside R	1
Sittingbourne R	2

Final
Ashford Town R	0
Sittingbourne R	1

==== Second Round ====
- Hythe Town R 1 – 4 Erith & Belvedere R
- Dover Athletic R 5 – 0 Faversham Town R
- Whitstable Town R 0 – 1 Ashford Town R
- Hastings Town R v Fisher Athletic R
- Folkestone R 1 – 3 Darenth Heathside R
- Thanet United R 2 – 0 Herne Bay R
- Sittingbourne R 3– 1 Sheppey United R
- Thames Polytechnic R 5 – 1 Deal Town R

==== First Round ====
- Ramsgate R 3 – 5 Ashford Town R
- Sheppey United R 3 – 1 Snowdown Colliery Welfare

Sources:

- Final:"Soccer Results And Fixtures: Results: Saturday: Winstonlead Kent League: Division 2 Cup Final". Kentish Express. 30 April 1987. p. 54 – via British Newspaper Archive.
- Semi-finals: "Gazette Soccer: Results:Tuesday: Winstonlead Kent League: Division 2 Cup, semi-final". Kentish Gazette. 27 March 1987. p. 69 – via British Newspaper Archive.; "Results And Fixtures: Results: Saturday: Winstonlead Kent League: Division 2: League Cup, semi-final". Kentish Express. 15 April 1987. p. 63 – via British Newspaper Archive.
- Quarter-finals: "Soccer Results And Fixtures: Results: Saturday: Winstonlead Kent League: Division 2: League Cup, Round 3". Kentish Express. 12 February 1987. p. 53 – via British Newspaper Archive.; "Soccer Results And Fixtures: Results: Saturday: Winstonlead Kent League: Division 2: League Cup, Round 3". Kentish Express. 5 March 1987. p. 54 – via British Newspaper Archive.
- Second Round:"Soccer Results And Fixtures: Results: Saturday: Winstonlead Kent League: League Cup, Round 2". Kentish Express. 6 November 1986. p. 55 – via British Newspaper Archive.; "Soccer Results And Fixtures: Results: Saturday: Winstonlead Kent League: League Cup, Division 2". Kentish Express. 13 November 1986. p. 55 – via British Newspaper Archive.; "Soccer Results And Fixtures: Results: Saturday: Winstonlead Kent League: Division 2 Cup, Round 2". Kentish Express. 20 November 1986. p. 55 – via British Newspaper Archive.; "Gazette Soccer: Results: Saturday: Winstonlead Kent League: Division 2 Cup, first round(sic)". Kentish Gazette. 12 December 1986. p. 78 – via British Newspaper Archive.
- First Round: "Results And Fixture Guide: Results: Saturday: Winstonlead Kent League: League Cup, Round 1". Kentish Express. 30 October 1986. p. 55 – via British Newspaper Archive.; "Jarvis helps reserves to finals place". Sheerness Times Guardian. 7 November 1986. p. 37 – via British Newspaper Archive.
