= Paddy Brennan (footballer) =

Irish footballer (1924–1991)

Personal information
- Full name: Patrick Joseph Brennan
- Date of birth: 1 March 1924
- Place of birth: Dublin, England
- Date of death: 11 January 1991 (aged 66)
- Place of death: Hove, England
- Height: 5 ft 8 in (1.73 m)
- Position: Left half

Senior career*
Years	Team	Apps	(Gls)
19??–1948	Shelbourne		
1948–1952	Brighton & Hove Albion	45	(0)
1952–1953	Yeovil Town		
1953–1956	Weymouth		
1956–1957	Dover		
1957–19??	Hove Town		
- * Club domestic league appearances and goals

Patrick Joseph Brennan (1 March 1924 – 11 January 1991) was an Irish professional footballer who played as a left half in the Football League for Brighton & Hove Albion.

== Life and career ==
Brennan was born in 1924 in Dublin. He came to prominence with League of Ireland club Shelbourne before signing for Brighton & Hove Albion in 1948. He made his Football League Third Division South debut towards the end of the year, and became a regular in 1949–50, but inconsistency cost him his place, and he made just six senior appearances in two years. He spent a season with Yeovil Town before joining Southern League rivals Weymouth, where he made 112 appearances in all competitions. A season with Dover preceded a return to the Brighton area where he was player-coach of Sussex County League side Hove Town and worked as an ambulance officer. Brennan died in Hove in 1991 at the age of 66.
