= 1969–70 Kent Football League =

Association football league season

Kent Football League
- Season: 1969–70
- Champions: Faversham Town
- Matches: 210
- Goals: 773 (3.68 per match)

The 1969–70 Kent Football League season was the fourth in the history of the Kent Football League, a football competition based in and around the county of Kent in England.

The league comprised one division and there was also a league cup competition, the Challenge Cup.

The league featured teams from 15 clubs including five reserves teams. Fourteen of the clubs had competed in the league the previous season and they were joined by one additional club:

- Kent Police, joined from the Kent County Amateur League

The league was won by Faversham Town, the first of two successive Kent League titles.

== League table ==
Pos	Team	Pld	W	D	L	GF	GA	GAv	Pts
1	Faversham Town	28	21	5	2	67	21	3.190	47
2	Kent Police	28	18	3	7	80	55	1.455	39
3	Tunnel Sports	28	15	7	6	58	25	2.320	37
4	Sittingbourne	28	15	7	6	60	36	1.667	37
5	Tunbridge Wells	28	10	11	7	56	50	1.120	31
6	Margate Reserves	28	11	8	9	47	49	0.959	30
7	Chatham Town	28	13	2	13	62	53	1.170	28
8	Snowdown Colliery Welfare	28	11	5	12	54	52	1.038	27
9	Whitstable Town	28	10	7	11	44	50	0.880	27
10	Deal Town Reserves	28	9	7	12	41	47	0.872	25
11	Ramsgate Athletic Reserves	28	8	7	13	53	62	0.855	23
12	Brett Sports	28	6	9	13	32	55	0.582	21
13	Sheppey United Reserves	28	5	7	16	44	71	0.620	17
14	Crockenhill	28	6	4	18	40	77	0.519	16
15	Folkestone Reserves	28	5	5	18	35	70	0.500	15

Source: "Kent League Final Table". Faversham News. 5 June 1970. p. 10 – via British Newspaper Archive.
Rules for classification: 1) points; 2) goal average; 3) number of goals scored.

== Challenge Cup ==
The 1969–70 Kent Football League Challenge Cup was won by newly admitted club Kent Police, their sole winners trophy whilst playing in the Kent League.

The competition was contested by the 15 teams from the league over four rounds, the first and second where two leg home and away aggregate score ties followed by single match knock-out semi-finals to reach the final, played on a neutral ground (at Sittingbourne F.C. this season).

=== Quarter-finals, Semi-finals and Final ===
Quarter-finals
Ramsgate Athletic Reserves	1	1	2
Chatham Town	1	6	7
Faversham Town	1	3 (Note: After extra time, score at 90 minutes: 1-1)	4
Whitstable Town	1	2	3
Sittingbourne	4	2	6
Deal Town Reserves	0	1	1
Kent Police	3	1	4
Tunnel Sports	1	1	2

Semi-finals
Chatham Town	3
Faversham Town	2
Sittingbourne	0
Kent Police	5

Final
Chatham Town	0
Kent Police	2

=== First Round ===
- Ramsgate Athletic Reserves 2 – 0 Sheppey United Reserves (1st Leg 1–0; 2nd Leg 1–0)
- Margate Reserves 4 – 5 Chatham Town (1st Leg 1–2; 2nd Leg 3–3)
- Tunbridge Wells 2 – 8 Faversham Town (1st Leg 1–5; 2nd Leg 1–3)
- Whitstable Town 3 – 2 Snowdown Colliery Welfare (1st Leg 3–1; 2nd Leg 0–1)
- Sittingbourne 7 – 1 Brett Sports (1st Leg 4–0; 2nd Leg 3–1)
- Crockenhill 3 – 10 Deal Town Reserves (1st Leg 3–4; 2nd Leg 0–6)
- Tunnel Sports 4 – 2 Folkestone Reserves (1st Leg 3–2; 2nd Leg 1–0)
- Bye for Kent Police

Sources:

- First Round: "Reserves Win". East Kent Times and Mail. 20 March 1970. p. 14 – via British Newspaper Archive.; "Kent League Cup". Sunday Mirror. 5 April 1970. p. 40 – via British Newspaper Archive.; "Kent League". Whitstable Times. 10 April 1970. p. 5 – via British Newspaper Archive.; "Town's Cup-tie Win". Whitstable Times. 17 April 1970. p. 7 – via British Newspaper Archive.; Bowles, Terry (20 April 1970). "Cup Lucky Chatham". Kent Evening Post. p. 17 – via British Newspaper Archive.; "County details". Kent Messenger. 24 April 1970. p. 15 – via British Newspaper Archive.; "Results". Thanet Times. 28 April 1970. p. 16 – via British Newspaper Archive.; "Kent League Cup". East Kent Times and Mail. 29 April 1970. p. 14 – via British Newspaper Archive.,
- Quarter-finals: "Bourne Keep in that Cup Mood". Kent Evening Post. 29 April 1970. p. 20 – via British Newspaper Archive.; "Results". Thanet Times. 5 May 1970. p. 16 – via British Newspaper Archive.; "Bourne Take Tumble". Kent Evening Post. 11 May 1970. p. 20 – via British Newspaper Archive.
- Semi-finals: "Cheer the Chatham Heroes". Kent Evening Post. 11 May 1970. p. 20 – via British Newspaper Archive.
- Final: Evans, John (18 May 1970). "Police Lock Out Chats". Kent Evening Post. p. 20 – via British Newspaper Archive.
