= Kentish Gazette =

- Type: Weekly newspaper
- Format: Tabloid
- Owner: KM Group
- Publisher: KM Group
- Editor: Joe Walker
- Founded: 1717
- Language: English
- Headquarters: Canterbury
- Circulation: 6,173 (as of 2022)
- Website: kentonline.co.uk

The Kentish Gazette is a weekly newspaper serving the city of Canterbury, Kent. It is owned by KM Group and published on Thursdays. Its Canterbury and Whitstable editions are the only local papers covering the area.

== History ==
The newspaper claims to be the second oldest surviving newspaper in the United Kingdom. It was founded by James Simmons in 1768 and, after a few weeks' competition, merged with its older rival, George Kirkby's Kentish Post which had been founded in 1717 and was the 28th known regional newspaper to be produced. The merged paper continued in existence as the Kentish Gazette under the joint management of Simmons and Kirkby.

In 1942 the Gazette's offices in Canterbury were destroyed by a Luftwaffe raid on the city. The paper was able to use the Kent Messenger's offices in Maidstone to produce that week's copy of the newspaper.

The Gazette, through a number of mergers and acquisitions, took control of other newspapers in the area such as the Whitstable Gazette, Herne Bay Gazette and East Kent Mercury, all of which were owned by Kent County Newspapers. KCN was taken over by the Kent Messenger Group in 1980.

Along with the rest of the KM-owned papers, the Gazette was given a design overhaul in May 2005.

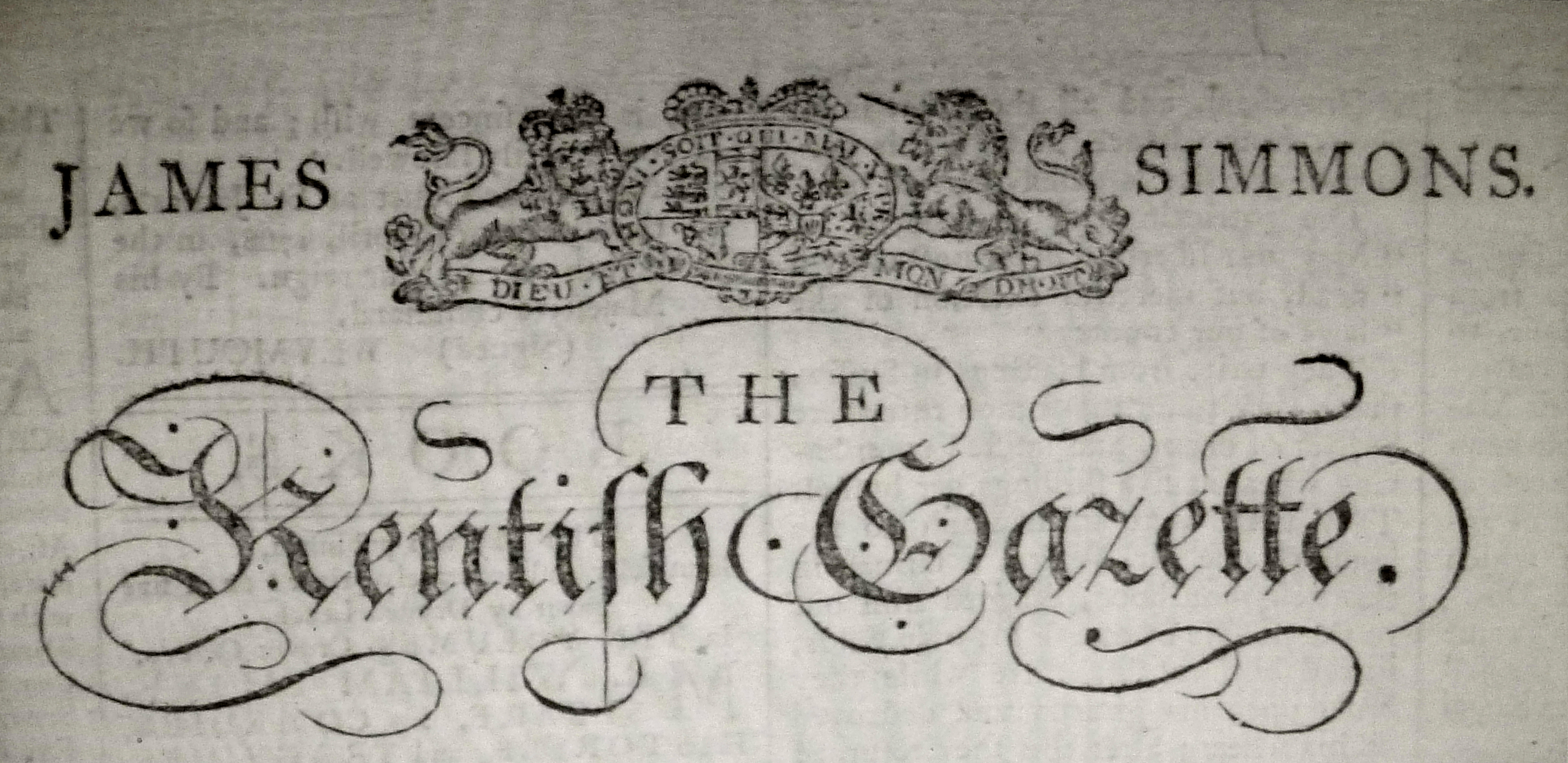
Masthead, 1768

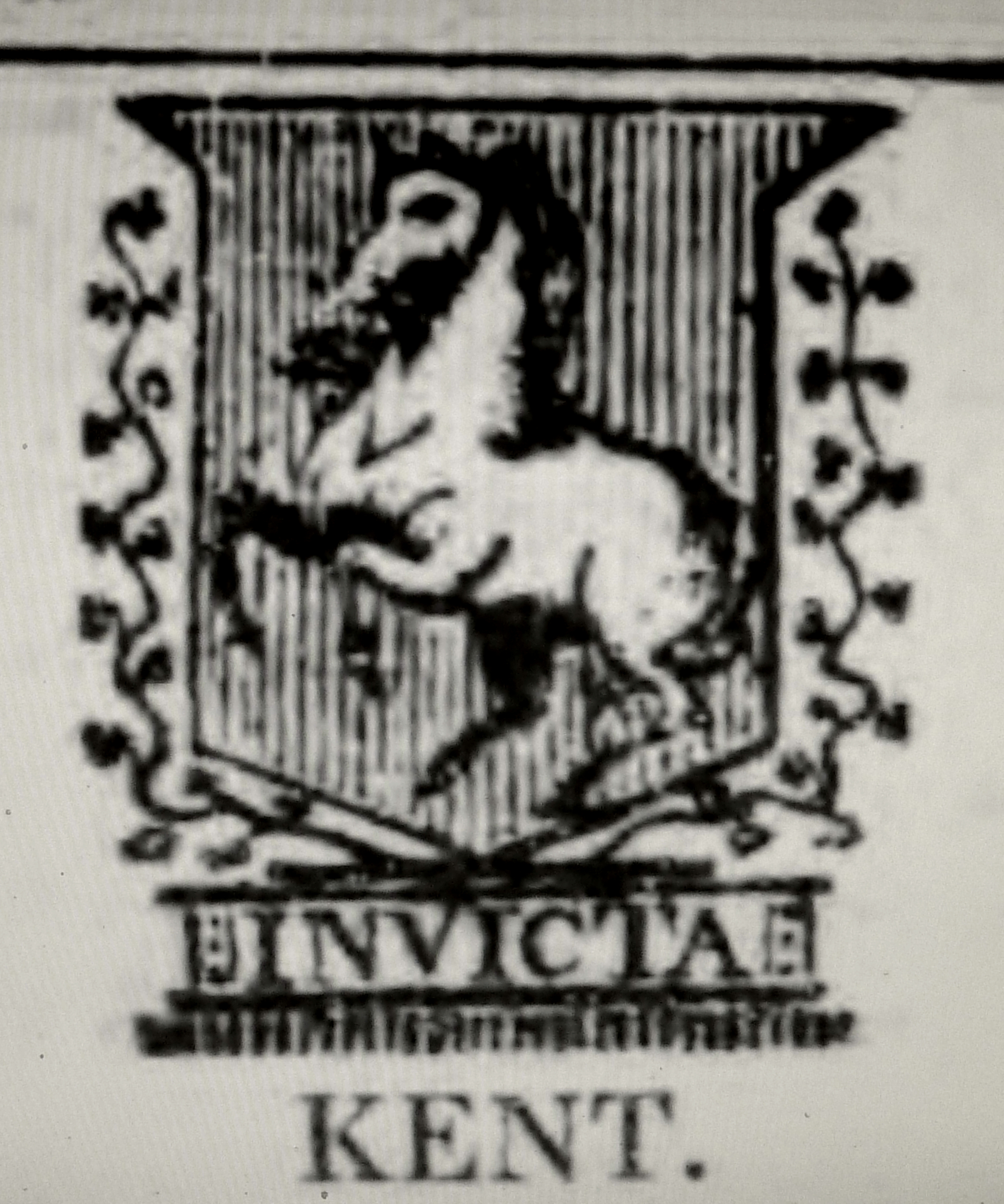
The Invicta, 1850

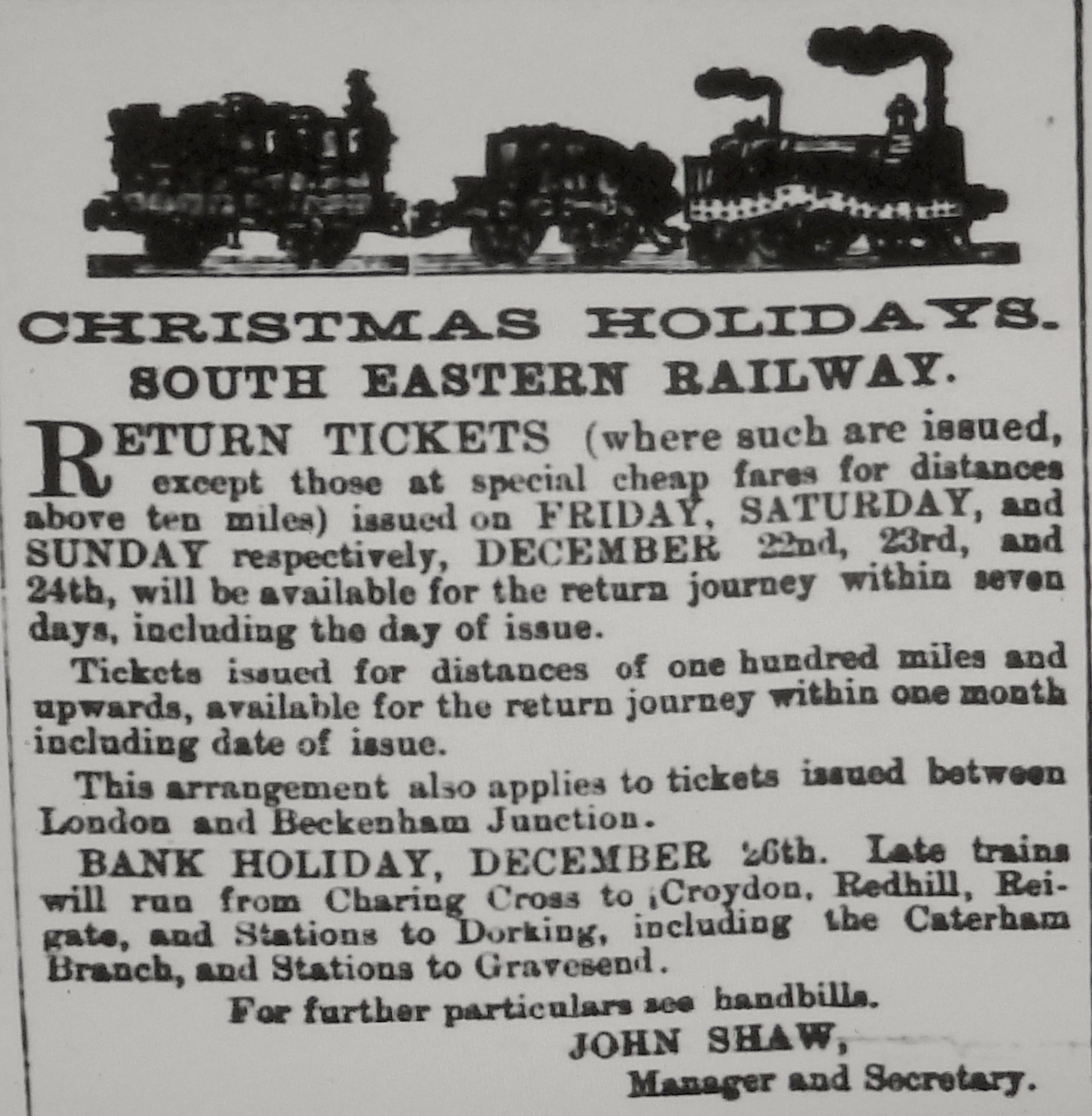
Advertisement, 1876

== Offices ==
Until 2008, the Kentish Gazette was based in Canterbury's city centre, sharing office space with its sister radio station KMFM Canterbury. The demands of a radio station and a newspaper were becoming too big for the building, so in September 2008 the Gazette and the sales team for KMFM Canterbury were moved to a newly built office building just outside Whitstable. The title has since returned to the city centre and is now located on the Canterbury College campus in New Dover Road.
