= Hastings United F.C. (1948) =

Hastings United
- Full name: Hastings United Football Club
- Nickname(s): The U's
- Founded: 1948
- Dissolved: 1985
- Ground: The Pilot Field, Hastings
- League: Southern League
Original colours	Final colours

Hastings United Football Club was an English football club based in Hastings, East Sussex. They were formed in 1948, playing in the Southern League through to 1985 when they folded due to financial problems.

== History ==
=== Early years ===
Within weeks of being founded the club were in a battle with local club Hastings & St. Leonards Amateurs for use of the lower pitch at the Pilot Field (The pitch now used by the current Hastings United). the proposal of ground sharing was considered, but was quickly dismissed as impractical.

United initially offered £600 rent, whilst the Amateurs offered £300, the same amount they had paid the previous season. Hastings Borough Council granted use of the lower pitch to United for £750 a year. On 6 August 1948 it was announced that Councillor Frank Oak had been appointed full-time secretary-manager of Hastings United, whilst George Steel, another councillor became the club's first chairman. United's début game was against another newly formed club Tonbridge, at the Angel ground on 21 August, United won the game 2–1.

=== The Jack Tresadern years ===
By the time Tresadern took over, the club had won one game in 21 league matches and had just lost 7–0 to Kettering. In Tresadern's first game in charge United won 3–0 at the Pilot Field, against sixth-placed Yeovil Town. However the club were already in a cash crisis, having to rely on donations from supporters to pay the players and travel to away games.

The 1953/54 saw United reach the third round of the FA Cup, beating Shoreham, Horsham, Eastbourne, Ashford and Hounslow in the preliminary rounds, before beating Guildford City 1–0 in the first round proper. 12 December 1953 saw Swindon Town from the Football League Third Division South visit the Pilot Field, in which a record crowd of 9917 saw United win 4–1, the first time Swindon had lost to a non-league side since World War Two. The third round saw United face Norwich City at the Pilot Field in front of 12,727, a record that still stands, the game ended 3–3. The replay at Carrow Road saw Hastings lose 3–0.

=== The Ted Ballard years ===
Ted Ballard was brought in as the new manager in March 1962. The previous manager, Tim Kelly, was contracted until June 1962, however by the time Ballard was brought in, the club were bottom of the league. Over the summer of 1962, Ballard built up a squad ready for the 1962–63 season. Hastings lost their first game 2–1 to Dover Athletic in front of a crowd of 2,542 at the Pilot Field, then drawing their next three games. However over the next 17 games, United only suffered one loss. No football was played between Boxing day and early March 1963, due to the severe winter, however they remained well-place for promotion. By the last day of the season, Hastings lost their game and could only hope that Dover did not win, the game ended 2–2 and Hastings won promotion to the Premier Division, after having to apply for re-election to the league the previous summer.

The 1963–64 season saw United finish in sixth place in the Premier Division, the best placing the club had managed in their 37-year history in the Southern League. Ted Ballard retired that summer to run a pub and Sid Bishop was brought in as manager, however, United were relegated back to the first division. The club were promoted then relegated again in the next three years.

=== The Peter Sillett years ===
Peter Sillett become manager in February 1979, prior to his arrival the club had three other managers that season, however, Sillett could not prevent the club finishing second from bottom in the Premier division. The next three seasons saw United finish tenth, third and second respectively, in the newly created Southern division. In the 1981–82 season, Wealdstone beat them to promotion by one point, but both clubs were elevated to the reformed Premier Division

The 1979–80 season saw Hastings reach the third round of the FA Trophy, being the only Southern League club to do so. They entered in the third qualifying round beating Margate, Frome Town and Oswestry before travelling to Barrow for a third round tie, their longest ever journey for an away game, Hastings lost the game 4–0.

For the first time in 21 years Hastings reached the first round proper of the FA Cup in the 1981–82 season. Hastings beat Chatham Town, Faversham Town, Canterbury City, Epsom & Ewell and Wembley en route to the first round tie against Enfield, from the Alliance Premier League. Hastings went on to lose the tie 2–0.

On the pitch the club were enjoying a successful spell, however the high standard of football was reflected in the players wage bill and Sillett being offered an improved contract by new chairman Bernard Sealy. Low income and high out-goings led to tension in the boardroom and Sealy was sacked as chairman, with Mick Piper taking his place. Sillett's contract was terminated in November 1983, with 19 months remaining. Gerry Boon, a player from the 1960s was promoted from reserve team manager and guided the team to a tenth-place finish in what was to be their penultimate season.

=== Final years ===
During their last 15 years Hastings were stalked by intense financial problems. Managers in charge during that period were forced to work with tight players' budgets, even during the successful era under Peter Sillett, players received late payments and refusals to play. By Mid-April the club had managed to pay off a £5,000 debt to the council and there were plans to sell the Squash Complex for £75,000.

After the squash complex was sold, debts still totalled to £8,000. On 6 June 1985 the directors agreed to surrender the Pilot Field lease at a meeting in the town hall. Hastings Town, who were forced to leave the Pilot Field back in 1948 as Hastings & St. Leonards, were back playing at the Pilot Field and were accepted into the Southern League, playing in the Southern Division.

== Colours ==
The club's original colours were claret and blue shirts with white shorts. By 1981 they had changed to all white.

== Honours and achievements ==
- Sussex County Cups
  - Sussex Senior Cup Winners 1978–79
- Southern League
  - Southern League Division One South Runners-up 1976–77
  - Southern League Southern Division Runners-up 1981–82
- Gilbert Rice Floodlight Cup
  - Winners 1985
