= Herne Bay F.C. =

Association football club in England

Coordinates: 51°21′53″N 1°07′48″E

Herne Bay
- Full name: Herne Bay Football Club
- Nickname: The Bay
- Founded: 1886
- Ground: Winch's Field, Herne Bay
- Capacity: 3,000 (200 seated)
- Chairman: Matt Barman
- Manager: Ben Smith
- League: Isthmian League South East Division
- 2025–26: Isthmian League South East Division, 13th of 22
Home colours	Away colours

Herne Bay Football Club is a football club based in Herne Bay, Kent, England. Affiliated to the Kent County Football Association, they are currently members of the Isthmian League South East Division and play at Winch's Field.

== History ==
The club was established in 1886. The first league they played in was the East Kent League, before joining Division Two of the Kent League in 1896. They finished bottom of the division in 1896–97 and 1897–98, before returning to the East Kent League. They went on to win the East Kent League title for four consecutive seasons between 1901–02 and 1905–06, before rejoining Division Two (East) of the Kent League in 1909. However, they left the league after a single season. They later folded in 1913.

After reforming, Herne Bay joined Division Two of the Eastern Section of the Kent County League in 1934. They remained in the division until World War II, playing in the North Division in 1939–40 and the East Division in 1945–46, a season which saw them finish bottom of the table. They were then placed in the North Division in 1946–47, again finishing bottom, and continued in the division in 1947–48 until league reorganisation saw them placed in Division One for the 1948–49 season. In 1953 the club returned to Division Two of the Kent League after moving to their Winch's Field ground, although they were one of only two first teams playing in the division.

Herne Bay were Division Two champions in 1954–55 and runners-up the following season, but were not promoted until the end of the 1956–57 season. Their first season in Division One saw them finish bottom of the table. When the Kent League folded in 1959, the club were founder members of the Aetolian League, joining Division One. At the end of the 1963–64, the Aetolian league merged with the London League into the Greater London League, with Herne Bay leaving to join Division Two of the Athenian League instead. They were Division Two champions in 1970–71, earning promotion to Division One. However, after finishing bottom of Division One in 1973–74 the club left to join the reformed Kent League.

The 1988–89 season saw Herne Bay finish bottom of the Kent League, but in 1991–92 they were league champions. They were runners-up the following season, before winning a second league title in 1993–94. The club went on to win back-to-back championships in 1996–97 and 1997–98. They finished as runners-up in 2000–01, 2004–05, 2009–10 and 2010–11 before winning the league again in 2011–12, this time earning promotion to Division One South of the Isthmian League. The 2011–12 season also saw the club reach the semi-finals of the FA Vase, eventually losing 4–3 on aggregate to West Auckland Town. In 2021–22 they finished third in the South East Division, qualifying for the promotion play-offs. After defeating Haywards Heath Town on penalties in the semi-finals, they beat Ashford United 2–0 in the final, earning promotion to the Premier Division. However, they finished third-from-bottom of the Premier Division the following season and were relegated back to the South East Division.

== Ground ==
Aerial photo of Winch's Field

After being reformed in the 1930s, the club initially played at the Memorial Park, which had previously been a rubbish tip. The final match at Memorial Park was played on 7 May 1953, after which the club moved to Winch's Field, named after the Winch's brickworks, which had previously been on the site. The new ground cost £5,000 to build and a crowd of over 1,000 attended the inaugural game on 26 August 1953, a 2–2 draw with Tunbridge Wells.

Covered stands were later built on all four sides of the pitch. Floodlights were installed in 1992 and a covered terrace behind one goal erected two years later. The ground currently has a capacity of 3,000, of which 200 is seated and 1,500 under cover. In April 2022 the club announced plans to install an artificial pitch.

== Honours ==
- Kent League
  - Champions 1991–92, 1992–93, 1996–97, 1997–98, 2011–12
  - Premier Division Cup winners 1996–97, 2009–10, 2010–11
  - Challenge Shield winners 1992–93, 1996–97, 1997–98, 2009–10
  - Division Two champions 1954–55
- Athenian League
  - Division Two champions 1970–71
- Kent County League
  - Eastern Section League Cup winners 1952–53
- East Kent League
  - Champions 1902–03, 1903–04, 1904–05, 1905–06
- Kent Senior Trophy
  - Winners 1978–79, 1996–97
- Kent Amateur Cup
  - Winners 1957–58
- Kent & Medway Combination Cup
  - Winners 1961–62

== Records ==
- Best FA Cup performance: Fourth qualifying round, 1970–71, 1986–87
- Best FA Trophy performance: Second qualifying round, 2015–16
- Best FA Vase performance: Semi-finals, 2011–12
- Record attendance: 2,303 vs Margate, FA Cup fourth qualifying round, 1970–71
- Biggest win 19–3 vs Hythe Wanderers February 1900
- Heaviest defeat: 11–0 vs Dragoon Guards October 1907
- Longest unbeaten run: 35 matches

== See also ==
- Herne Bay F.C. players
- Herne Bay F.C. managers
