= Kentish Express =

- Type: Weekly newspaper
- Format: Tabloid
- Owner: KM Group
- Publisher: KM Group
- Editor: Robert Barman
- Founded: 1855
- Language: English
- Headquarters: Ashford, Kent
- Circulation: 3,209 (as of 2022)

The Kentish Express is a weekly newspaper serving southern Kent. It is published in four editions – Ashford, Folkestone, Hythe and Romney Marsh, and Tenterden. The title is owned by the KM Group and published on Thursdays.

== History ==
The Kentish Express was founded in 1855 as the Ashford and Alfred News by Henry Igglesden. The first edition was published on 14 July 1855. The paper was Kent's first penny paper after the abolition of stamp duty on newspapers in 1854. Three years later, the paper was renamed the Kentish Express & Ashford News.

Henry's son Charles Igglesden (1861–1949) took over as editor at 23 years of age, after attending the Paris Conservatoire and a period as a reporter. He remained in post for a further 64 years and was knighted in 1928.

Charles Igglesden represented Kent at lawn tennis; Ashford at rugby and cricket; beat Sir Arthur Conan Doyle at billiards, and was a lifelong friend of W G Grace.

His “A Saunter through Kent with Pen and Pencil” newspaper articles, describing 242 Kent villages, were republished as 34 books.

In January 1916, Igglesden was one of the first journalists invited to report from the World War I trenches by Lord Kitchener.

The KM Group bought the Express in 1971. It also purchased the Folkestone Express, which was renamed the Kentish Express (Folkestone) in 2008.

Along with the rest of the KM-owned papers, the Express was given a design overhaul in May 2005.

== Offices ==
All four editions of the Kentish Express are based at the KM Group's Ashford offices. The Folkestone and Hythe editions were based at the Folkestone offices until April 2009, when the offices were closed.

== Circulation ==
The combined circulation of the four papers in the first half of 2009 was 18,664, a drop of 12.4% against the same period in 2008.
