= Dover F.C. =

English football club

Dover F.C. was a football club based in Dover, Kent, England. The club joined the Kent League in 1894, but folded in 1901. Dover FC was revived a year later, this time as a purely amateur club, and rejoined the Kent League, but folded again in 1909. In 1920, the club reformed, this time as Dover United FC and played in local leagues but disbanded for the third time in 1933. A further incarnation of the club came under the name Dover FC, began play a year later, and then folded in 1947.

A new semi-professional Dover FC was immediately formed and rejoined the Kent League, going on to win the league championship twice in the 1950s before progressing to the Southern League. Dover won the championship of Division One in 1967. Johnny Ray was the leading scorer with 42 goals in 49 games helping the club to gain promotion to the Premier Division, where the club spent eleven seasons before being relegated. In 1983, the club folded due to its massive debts. A new club, Dover Athletic, took over its place in the league and remains active.

== Honours ==
- Southern League Division One (Tier 6)
  - Champions: 1966–67
- Southern League Division One South (Tier 6)
  - Champions: 1978–79
- Kent League
  - Champions: 1951–52
- Kent Senior Cup
  - Winners (7): 1951–52, 1959–60, 1961–62, 1966–67, 1967–68, 1970–71, 1971–72
