= Deal Town F.C. =

Association football club in England

Coordinates: 51°12′59″N 1°23′21″E

Deal Town
- Full name: Deal Town Football Club
- Nickname: The Hoops
- Founded: 1919
- Ground: Charles Sports Ground, Deal
- Chairperson: Natalie Benville
- Manager: Steve King
- League: Isthmian League South East Division
- 2025–26: Isthmian League South East Division, 8th of 22
- Website: https://dealtownfc.co.uk
Home colours	Away colours

Deal Town Football Club is a football club based in Deal in Kent, England. FA Vase winners in 2000, they are currently members of the Isthmian League South East Division and play at the Charles Sports Ground.

== History ==
The club was established as Deal D.S. & S in 1919, and initially played in the Dover & District Junior League. They joined the Eastern Section of the Kent Amateur League in 1928, but left the league in 1930. The club re-entered the Kent League for a second time in 1933, joining Division Two, but left in 1935, returning to the renamed Kent County Amateur League. They finished as runners-up in Division One of the Eastern Section in 1935–36, and later returned to Division Two of the Kent League for a third spell in the league in 1939.

Deal did not take part in the 1944–45 season, but spent the 1945–46 season in the East Division of the Eastern Section of the Kent County Amateur League, finishing as runners-up. They returned to the Kent League in 1946–47, when they became members of Division One. Despite finishing bottom in their first season, they were not relegated, and went on to win the league in 1953–54. They later won the League Cup in 1957–58, beating Margate in the final. When the league folded in 1959, Deal became founder members of the Aetolian League, and were runners-up in its first season. In 1963 the club moved up to Division One of the Southern League. However, after three seasons of struggle and finishing bottom of the division in 1965–66, they left the league to join the Premier Division of the Greater London League (a merger of the Aetolian League and the London League), in which they won the League Cup in 1967–68, and were runners-up in 1968–69. In 1970 league reorganisation saw them placed in the 'B' section of the league.

When the Greater London League merged with the Spartan League at the end of the 1970–71 season, Deal's first team opted not to join the merged league and instead took over from their reserve team in the new Kent League. They won the League Cup in 1981–82, beating Erith & Belvedere in the final. They were league runners-up in 1988–89 and again in 1998–99, also winning the League Cup in the latter season with a win over VCD Athletic. The 1999–2000 season saw them win the league, reach the final of the FA Vase and beat Chippenham Town 1–0 in the Wembley final, as well as winning the Kent Senior Trophy. The club's success that season also saw them reach the final of the Kent League Cup, but they could not play the final due to fixture congestion. The Kent League was renamed the Southern Counties East League in 2013, and when the league gained a second division in 2016, they became members of the Premier Division. The 2023–24 season saw the club win the Premier Division title, earning promotion to the South East Division of the Isthmian League.

=== Reserve team ===
Deal Town 'A' played in the Kent Amateur League in 1932–33 and 1933–34, before the reserve team joined Division Two of the Eastern Section in 1935. The reserve team replaced the first team in the league in 1946, and were placed in the South Division of the Eastern Section. League reorganisation saw them become members of Division One of the Eastern Section in 1948, but they left the league in 1950. They were later founder members of the new Kent League in 1966, but were replaced by the first team in 1971. In 1982–83 and 1983–84 they played in Division Two of the Eastern Section of the Kent County League. They later rejoined the reserve divisions of the Kent League, before returning to the Kent County League in 2013.

In July 2022 the Deal Town Rangers Seniors squad became the new reserve team. They won the 2022–23 Kent County League Division Two Central & East title, winning all 18 league matches.

=== Women's team ===
In June 2021 a women's team was formed, when the club absorbed the women's team of Deal Town Rangers. The team joined Division Two East of the South East Counties Women's League. In 2022–23 they won the Division Two East title, winning eleven out of their twelve matches and drawing the other.

== Honours ==
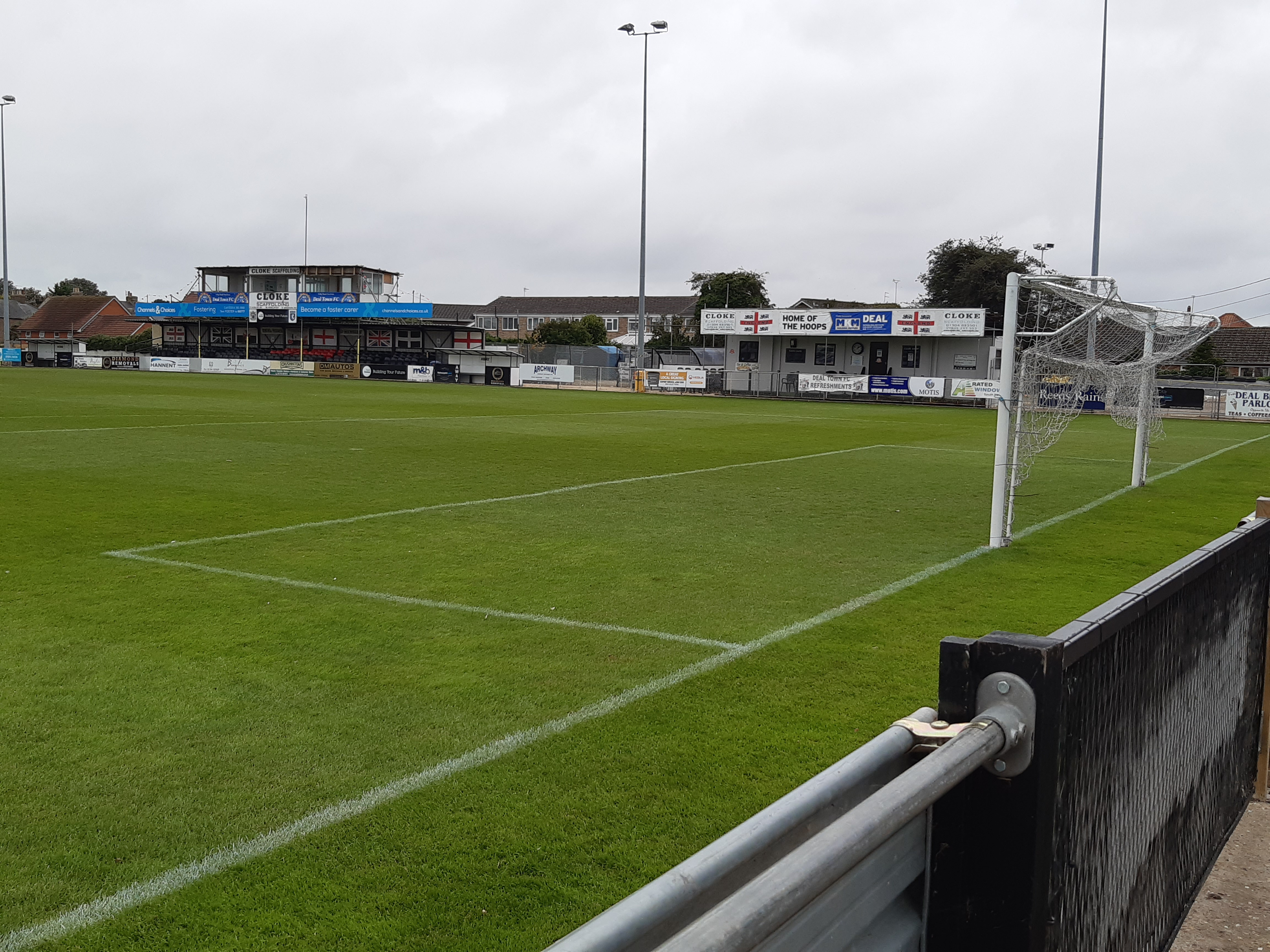
The Charles Ground, the club's stadium

- Southern Counties East League
  - Champions 1999–2000, 2023–24
  - League Cup winners 1981–82, 1998–99
- Kent League
  - Champions 1953–54
  - Winners 1957–58
- Greater London League
  - League Cup winners 1967–68
- FA Vase
  - Winners 1999–2000
- Kent Senior Trophy
  - Winners 1994–95, 1999–2000

== Records ==
- Best FA Cup performance: Third qualifying round, 1964–65, 1982–83, 1992–93, 1997–98, 2025–26
- Best FA Trophy performance: First round, 2026–27
- Best FA Vase performance: Winners, 1999–2000
- Record attendance: 4,263 vs Dover, Kent League Division One, 18 August 1951

== See also ==
- Deal Town F.C. players
- Deal Town F.C. managers
