= British Newspaper Archive =

Digitized archive of British newspapers

- Owner: Findmypast
- Website: britishnewspaperarchive.com
- Launched: November 2011; 14 years ago
- Current status: Active

The British Newspaper Archive website provides access to searchable digitised archives of British and Irish newspapers. It was launched in November 2011.

== History ==
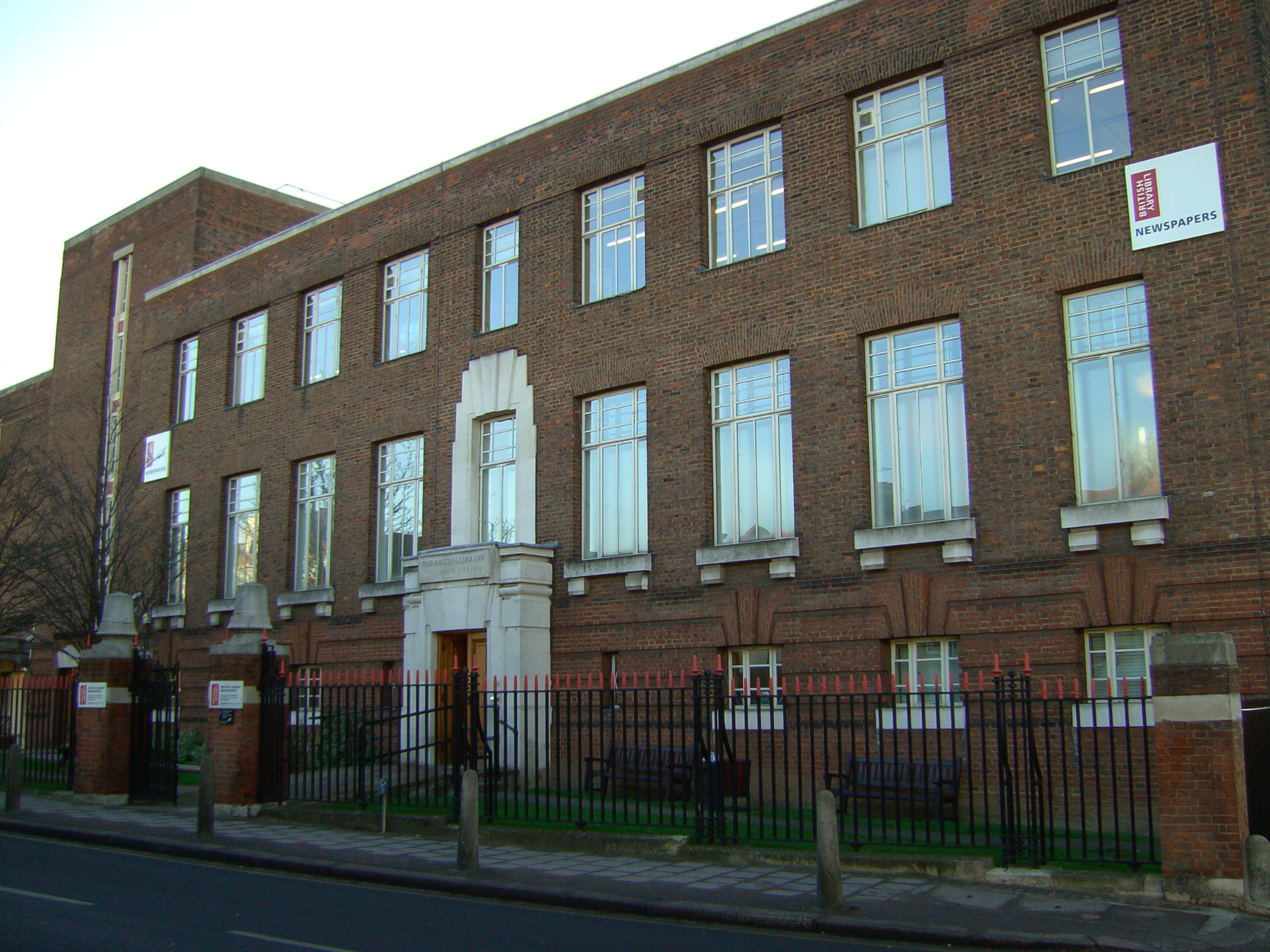
The former British Library Newspapers, Colindale, since demolished

The British Library's Newspapers section was based in Colindale in north London until 2013, and is now divided between the St Pancras and Boston Spa sites. The library has an almost complete collection of British and Irish newspapers since 1840. This is partly because of the legal deposit legislation of 1869, which required newspapers to supply a copy of each edition of a newspaper to the library. London editions of national daily and Sunday newspapers are complete back to 1801. In total, the collection consists of 660,000 bound volumes and 370,000 reels of microfilm containing tens of millions of newspapers with 52,000 titles on 45 km of shelves.

After the closure of Colindale in November 2013, access to the 750 million original printed pages was maintained via an automated and climate-controlled storage facility in Boston Spa, which opened in April 2014.

Printed pages which are available to subscribers include news articles covering issues of local and regional importance, family notices, letters to editors written by newspaper readers, obituaries and advertisements.

As of 2025, it is owned by the family history company Findmypast, which is part of DC Thomson.

=== Digitisation ===
In May 2010, a ten-year programme of digitisation of the newspaper archives with commercial partner DC Thomson subsidiary Brightsolid began. In November 2011, BBC News reported on the launch of the British Newspaper Archive, an initiative to facilitate online access to over one million pages of pre-20th century newspapers. The same newspapers from this partnership have also been made available to view on Findmypast and Genes Reunited.

As well as scanning of original paper copy, the project also scanned from microfilm copies that had been created by the British Library over the years. The digitisation project established an online search facility that people could consult without having to visit the British Library newspaper depository in person.

In 2021, Findmypast and the British Library announced an extension of their long-term partnership in the British Newspaper Archive. They said that a further 14 million pages would be added to the online archive over the following three years, including 1 million free-to-access pages each year.

Among the collections are the Thomason Tracts, containing 7,200 17th-century news pamphlets and newsbooks, and the Burney Collection, featuring nearly 1 million pages of newspapers from the late eighteenth century and early nineteenth century. The Thomason Tracts and Burney collections are held at St Pancras, and are available in digital facsimile.

The section also has extensive records of non-British newspapers in languages that use the Latin and Cyrillic alphabets. The library's substantial holdings of newspapers in the languages of Asia and the Middle East may be accessed at the library's reading rooms at St. Pancras.

Considered the most significant mass digitisation of newspapers the UK has seen, Roly Keating, Chief Executive of the British Library, recalled in 2021, "Over the past decade, the British Newspaper Archive has transformed access to the extraordinarily rich collection of historic newspapers in our care. As well as protecting the fragile originals, digitisation has transformed the ways in which researchers can search newspaper content and make connections and discoveries that might never have been possible using print or microfilm."

On 29 May 2025, earlier editions of the News Letter dating back to October 1738 were added to the website.

== Subscription costs ==
Access within the British Library is free. Starting in 2021, some newspaper pages from the years 1720–1880 are free to view online. Full online access is by subscription, based on daily or item charges, £14.99 for one month or £8.34 per month for an annual subscription, as of December 2024. New visitors may access three free page views and explore hundreds of national, regional and local titles dating from the 1700s–2000s.

== Reception ==
Reviews of the service have been mixed, with some early responses complimentary about the ability to access and search the large data sets. However, there have been complaints of the excessive cost and the general policy of the British Library allowing a private company the rights to the newspapers. One writer noted that: "The BNA demonstrates what happens to our cultural heritage when there is no political will for public investment. The nineteenth-century newspaper press was one of the period's greatest achievements but, rather than celebrate it, opening it up and giving it back to the nation, the British Library have been forced to sell it off."

The search interface has also been criticised for problems in identifying where the searched terms are on the retrieved pages, and in the unreliability of the web interface, with bugs preventing images loading and regular crashes.

In 2026, a newer version started, and Trustpilot reported that "most reviewers were unhappy with their experience overall."
