= 1987–88 Kent Football League =

Association football league season

The 1987–88 Kent Football League season (known as the Winstonlead Kent League for sponsorship reasons) was the twenty-second in the history of the Kent Football League, a football competition featuring teams based in and around the county of Kent in England.

The League structure comprised two divisions: Division One and Division Two with the latter known as the Reserves Section (reserves teams were not permitted in Division One). Additionally there were two league cup competitions: the Challenge Cup for the Division One clubs and another for the teams in Division Two.

== Division One ==
Kent Football League Division One
- Season: 1987–88
- Champions: Greenwich Borough
- Matches: 342
- Goals: 1,086 (3.18 per match)

The league featured nineteen clubs, eighteen of which competed in the previous season together with one additional club:

- Danson, transferred from the London Spartan League

The league was won, for the second successive season, by Greenwich Borough.

At the end of the season both bottom clubs, Herne Bay and Crockenhill, were re-elected to continue their membership of the division.

=== League table ===
Pos	Team	Pld	W	D	L	GF	GA	GD	Pts	Season End Notes
1	Greenwich Borough	36	26	5	5	111	50	+61	83	
2	Faversham Town	36	23	7	6	92	36	+56	76	
3	Whitstable Town	36	20	8	8	57	37	+20	68	
4	Sittingbourne	36	17	11	8	68	53	+15	62	
5	Hythe Town	36	19	4	13	70	58	+12	61	
6	Kent Police	36	16	8	12	69	66	+3	56	
7	Cray Wanderers	36	16	7	13	72	51	+21	55	
8	Beckenham Town	36	16	5	15	61	55	+6	53	
9	Tunbridge Wells	36	14	10	12	57	50	+7	52	
10	Ramsgate	36	14	8	14	55	53	+2	50	
11	Darenth Heathside	36	11	11	14	57	58	−1	44	
12	Alma Swanley	36	11	11	14	41	47	−6	44	
13	Metropolitan Police (Hayes)	36	11	8	17	45	61	−16	41	
14	Slade Green	36	10	9	17	54	60	−6	39	
15	Danson	36	10	9	17	44	68	−24	39	
16	Deal Town	36	11	5	20	40	67	−27	38	
17	Thames Polytechnic	36	10	8	18	37	65	−28	38	
18	Herne Bay	36	9	8	19	35	69	−34	35	Re-elected
19	Crockenhill	36	4	6	26	21	82	−61	18	Re-elected

Source: "Non League Tables for 1987–1988: Kent League Division One". Non League Matters.; "(col. 1) Winstonlead Kent League". Sheerness Times Guardian. 19 May 1988. p. 45 – via British Newspaper Archive.
Rules for classification: 1) points; 2) goal difference; 3) number of goals scored.

=== Challenge Cup ===
The 1987–88 Kent Football League Challenge Cup was won, for the second occasion in three seasons, by Tunbridge Wells.

The competition, contested by all nineteen clubs in Division One, comprised five single match tie rounds (with the first round featuring three ties) culminating in the final which was played on a neutral ground (at Herne Bay F.C. this season).

==== Quarter-finals, Semi-finals and Final ====
Quarter-finals
Tunbridge Wells	3
Whitstable Town	0
Kent Police	2
Metropolitan Police (Hayes)	1
Hythe Town	3
Sittingbourne	2
Darenth Heathside	0
Cray Wanderers	1

Semi-finals
Tunbridge Wells	2
Kent Police	1
Hythe Town	2
Cray Wanderers	1

Final
Tunbridge Wells	4
Hythe Town	1

==== Second Round ====
- Tunbridge Wells 3 – 1 Beckenham Town
- Whitstable Town 3– 2 Faversham Town
- Deal Town 2 – 3 Kent Police
- Metropolitan Police (Hayes) 3 – 2 Thames Polytechnic
- Hythe Town 4 – 1 Crockenhill
- Sittingbourne 1 – 0 Herne Bay
- Darenth Heathside 1 – 1 (aet) Alma Swanley
- Replay: Alma Swanley 1 – 3 Darenth Heathside
- Greenwich Borough 1 – 2 Cray Wanderers

==== First Round ====
- Slade Green 0 – 1 Deal Town
- Metropolitan Police (Hayes) 2 – 1 Ramsgate
- Alma Swanley 1 – 0 Danson (played at Danson F.C.)
- Byes for the other thirteen clubs

Sources:

- Final: "Bank Holiday Results, Fixtures: Results: Saturday: Winstonlead Kent League, Division One cup final". Kentish Express. 5 May 1988. p. 60 – via British Newspaper Archive.
- Semi-finals: "Senior soccer details: Results: Saturday: Winstonlead Cup semi-finals". Kent Messenger. 31 March 1988. p. 87 – via British Newspaper Archive.
- Quarter-finals: "Senior soccer details: Results: Saturday: Winstonlead Cup third rd". Kent Messenger. 11 March 1988. p. 79 – via British Newspaper Archive.
- Second Round: "Senior soccer details: Results: Saturday: Winstonlead Kent League: League Cup 2nd round". Kent Messenger. 20 November 1987. p. 79 – via British Newspaper Archive.; "Results And Fixtures: Results: Saturday: Winstonlead Kent League Cup, round 2 replay". Kentish Express. 3 December 1987. p. 71 – via British Newspaper Archive.
- First Round: "Senior soccer details: Results: Saturday: Winstonlead League Cup first round". Kent Messenger. 9 October 1987. p. 79 – via British Newspaper Archive.

== Reserves Section ==
The letter "R" following team names indicates a club's reserves team.

Division Two featured mostly reserves teams (which were not permitted in Division One) from clubs from Kent and the adjacent area whose first team played in Division One and other higher ranked leagues. There was a League Cup competition for the teams in the section.

=== Division Two ===
Kent Football League Division Two
- Season: 1987–88
- Champions: Fisher Athletic R
- Matches: 306
- Goals: 1,036 (3.39 per match)

The league featured eighteen clubs (including one non-reserve team, Snowdown Colliery Welfare), seventeen of which had competed in the division the previous season together with one additional club, newly reformed Beckenham Town R.

The division was won for a then record third successive season (and the fourth time in five seasons) by Fisher Athletic R.

At the end of the season both bottom clubs, Hythe Town R and Herne Bay R were re-elected to continue their membership of the division. Prior to the start of the next season champions Fisher Athletic R and Darenth Heathside R withdrew.

Pos	Team	Pld	W	D	L	GF	GA	GD	Pts	Season End Notes
1	Fisher Athletic R	34	27	4	3	111	21	+90	85	Resigned
2	Ashford Town R	34	23	5	6	77	25	+52	74	
3	Faversham Town R	34	21	4	9	71	38	+33	67	
4	Dover Athletic R	34	19	6	9	64	47	+17	63	
5	Sittingbourne R	34	19	5	10	72	52	+20	62	
6	Darenth Heathside R	34	16	11	7	63	43	+20	59	Resigned
7	Snowdown Colliery Welfare	34	16	9	9	59	47	+12	57	
8	Whitstable Town R	34	13	7	14	31	44	−13	46	
9	Sheppey United R	34	14	3	17	57	53	+4	45	
10	Hastings Town R	34	13	6	15	60	69	−9	45	
11	Ramsgate R	34	13	2	19	54	56	−2	41	
12	Deal Town R	34	11	6	17	59	75	−16	39	
13	Folkestone R	34	12	3	19	47	80	−33	39	
14	Beckenham Town R	34	10	3	21	54	74	−20	33	
15	Thames Polytechnic R	34	10	3	21	39	73	−34	33	
16	Thanet United R	34	7	9	18	36	68	−32	30	
17	Hythe Town R	34	8	4	22	41	85	−44	28	Re-elected
18	Herne Bay R	34	8	2	24	41	86	−45	26	Re-elected

Source: "Non League Tables for 1987–1988: Kent League Division Two". Non League Matters.; "(col. 1) Winstonlead Kent League: Division Two". Sheerness Times Guardian. 19 May 1988. p. 45 – via British Newspaper Archive.
Rules for classification: 1) points; 2) goal difference; 3) number of goals scored.

=== Division Two Cup ===
The 1987–88 Kent Football League Division Two Cup was won, for a second successive season, by Sittingbourne R.

The competition, contested by all eighteen clubs in the division, comprised five single match tie rounds (with the first round featuring two ties) culminating in the final which was played on a neutral ground (at Faversham Town F.C. this season).

==== Quarter-finals, Semi-finals and Final ====
Quarter-finals
Ashford Town R	2
Deal Town R	0
Sittingbourne R	4
Hastings Town R	1
Sheppey United R	1
Beckenham Town R	0
Fisher Athletic R	4
Darenth Heathside R	1

Semi-finals
Ashford Town R	4 (Note: After extra time, score at 90 minutes: 2–2)	0
Sittingbourne R	4	1
Sheppey United R	3
Fisher Athletic R	2

Final
Sittingbourne R	3
Sheppey United R	2

==== Second Round ====
- Herne Bay R 1 – 4 Ashford Town R
- Deal Town R 6 – 0 Thames Polytechnic R
- Thanet United R 2 – 4 Sittingbourne R
- Folkestone R 2 – 3 Hastings Town R
- Ramsgate R v Sheppey United R
- Whitstable Town R 1– 2 Beckenham Town R
- Faversham Town R 0 – 1 Fisher Athletic R
- Dover Athletic R 2 – 3 Darenth Heathside R

==== First Round ====
- Ashford Town R 1 – 0 Hythe Town R
- Faversham Town R 3 – 1 Snowdown Colliery Welfare
- Byes for the other fourteen clubs

Sources:

- Final: "Mawson double seals cup in late late thriller". East Kent Gazette. 19 May 1988. p. 27 – via British Newspaper Archive.
- Semi-finals: "Reserves tilt for cup". East Kent Gazette. 7 April 1988. p. 40 – via British Newspaper Archive.; "Soccer Results And Fixtures: Results: Saturday: Winstonlead Kent League: Division 2 League Cup, semi-final". Kentish Express. 21 April 1988. p. 38 – via British Newspaper Archive.; "Reserves crash out in replay". Kentish Express. 28 April 1988. p. 71 – via British Newspaper Archive.
- Quarter-finals: "Results And Fixtures: Winstonlead Kent League Cup, round 3". Kentish Express. 11 February 1988. p. 69 – via British Newspaper Archive.; "Soccer Results And Fixtures: Results: Saturday: Winstonlead Kent League: Division 2: League Cup, Round 3". Kentish Express. 10 March 1988. p. 60 – via British Newspaper Archive.; "McLeod Double Secures Semis Spot". East Kent Gazette. 10 March 1988. p. 42 – via British Newspaper Archive.
- Second Round: "Results And Fixtures: Results: Saturday: Winstonlead Kent League: Division 2 Cup, second round". Kentish Express. 12 November 1987. p. 62 – via British Newspaper Archive.; "Results, Fixtures, Tables: Results: Saturday: Winstonlead Kent League: Dvision 2 Cup". Kentish Express. 19 November 1987. p. 61 – via British Newspaper Archive.; "Soccer Results And Fixtures: Results: Saturday: Winstonlead Kent League: Division 2 Cup, round 2". Kentish Express. 26 November 1987. p. 63 – via British Newspaper Archive.; "Holiday Results, Fixtures, Tables: Results: Saturday: Winstonlead Kent League: League Cup". Kentish Express. 7 January 1988. p. 60 – via British Newspaper Archive.
- First Round: "Soccer Results And Fixtures: Results: Saturday: Winstonlead Kent League Division 2: League Cup". Kentish Express. 8 October 1987. p. 62 – via British Newspaper Archive.
