= 1984–85 Kent Football League =

Association football league season

The 1984–85 Kent Football League season was the nineteenth in the history of the Kent Football League, a football competition featuring teams based in and around the county of Kent in England.

The League structure comprised two divisions: Division One and Division Two with the latter known as the Reserves Section (reserves teams were not permitted in Division One). Additionally there were two league cup competitions: the Challenge Cup for the Division One clubs and another for the teams in Division Two.

== Division One ==
Kent Football League Division One
- Season: 1984–85
- Champions: Tunbridge Wells
- Matches: 272
- Goals: 909 (3.34 per match)

The league featured seventeen clubs, fifteen of which competed in the previous season together with two additional clubs:

- Greenwich Borough, transferred from the London Spartan League
- Metropolitan Police (Hayes), joined from the Kent County Amateur League

The league was won by Tunbridge Wells, their first league winners title in the reformed Kent League.

At the end of the season both bottom clubs, Crockenhill and Ramsgate were re-elected to continue their membership of the division.

=== League table ===
Pos	Team	Pld	W	D	L	GF	GA	GD	Pts	Season End Notes
1	Tunbridge Wells	32	22	6	4	83	39	+44	72	
2	Hythe Town	32	22	6	4	70	33	+37	72	
3	Sittingbourne	32	21	4	7	77	43	+34	66	
4	Beckenham Town	32	17	8	7	67	46	+21	59	
5	Cray Wanderers	32	17	2	13	59	51	+8	53	
6	Greenwich Borough	32	15	6	11	62	49	+13	51	
7	Faversham Town	32	13	8	11	44	42	+2	47	
8	Darenth Heathside	32	13	7	12	45	43	+2	46	
9	Metropolitan Police (Hayes)	32	10	13	9	66	66	0	43	
10	Whitstable Town	32	12	4	16	43	44	−1	40	
11	Alma Swanley (Note: Alma Swanley were deducted one point and one goal, the deducted goal has been reinstated in the table)	32	11	7	14	47	49	−2	39 (Note: Alma Swanley were deducted one point)	
12	Deal Town	32	9	10	13	50	57	−7	37	
13	Herne Bay	32	7	8	17	43	57	−14	29	
14	Slade Green Athletic	32	7	7	18	35	66	−31	28	
15	Kent Police (Note: Kent Police were deducted two goals, which have been reinstated in the table.)	32	8	3	21	48	88	−40	27	
16	Crockenhill	32	6	7	19	34	63	−29	25	Re-elected
17	Ramsgate	32	6	6	20	36	73	−37	24	Re-elected

Source: "Kent League 1966–92: 1984–85". Non League Matters. "England – Kent League: Final Table Kent League (Division 1) '84–'85". The Rec.Sport.Soccer Statistics Foundation.
Rules for classification: 1) points; 2) goal difference; 3) number of goals scored.

=== Challenge Cup ===
The 1984–85 Kent Football League Challenge Cup (named the Winstonlead Kent League Cup for sponsorship reasons) was won by Greenwich Borough in their first season in the league. The competition, contested by all seventeen clubs in the league, comprised five single match tie rounds (with a single tie in the first round) culminating in the final.

==== Quarter-finals, Semi-finals and Final ====
Quarter-finals
Sittingbourne	1	1 (Note: Replay)
Darenth Heathside	1	3
Beckenham Town	3
Alma Swanley	2
Tunbridge Wells	3
Cray Wanderers	0
Kent Police
Greenwich Borough

Semi-finals
Darenth Heathside	0
Beckenham Town	2
Tunbridge Wells	1
Greenwich Borough	2

Final
Beckenham Town	2 (Note: After extra time)
Greenwich Borough	3

==== Second Round ====
- Hythe Town 0 – 2 Sittingbourne
- Darenth Heathside 1 – 0 Ramsgate
- Crockenhill 3 – 4 Beckenham Town
- Whitstable Town 0 – 1 (aet) Alma Swanley (score at 90 minutes 0–0)
- Herne Bay 0 – 3 Tunbridge Wells
- Cray Wanderers 1– 0 Metropolitan Police (Hayes)
- Kent Police 5 – 5 Deal Town
- REPLAY 1: Deal Town v Kent Police
- REPLAY 2: Kent Police 4 – 0 Deal Town
- Greenwich Borough 4 – 0 Slade Green Athletic

==== First Round ====
- Faversham Town 2 – 3 Greenwich Borough
- Byes for the other fifteen teams

Sources:

- Final: "Minor Results: Kent: Cup Final". The Sunday People. 12 May 1985. p. 45 – via British Newspaper Archive.
- Semi-finals: "Senior soccer details: Results: Saturday: Kent League: Winstonlead Cup semi-final". Kent Messenger. 12 April 1985. p. 79 – via British Newspaper Archive.; "Minor Results: Kent: Cup semi-final". The Sunday People. 5 May 1985. p. 45 – via British Newspaper Archive.
- Quarter-finals: "Senior soccer details: Results: Saturday: Kent League: Winstonlead Cup 3rd rnd". Kent Messenger. 22 March 1985. p. 79 – via British Newspaper Archive.; "Soccer Results and Fixtures: Results: Saturday: Kent League: Division 1: League Cup, Round 3 replay". Kentish Express. 28 March 1985. p. 52 – via British Newspaper Archive.
- Second Round:"Senior soccer details: Results: Saturday: Kent League: Winstonlead League Cup 2nd rd". Kent Messenger. 1 March 1985. p. 79 – via British Newspaper Archive.; "Soccer Results, Fixtures and Tables: Results: Saturday: Kent League: League Cup, Round 2". Kentish Express. 7 March 1985. p. 46 – via British Newspaper Archive.; "Senior soccer details: Results: Saturday: Kent League: Winstonlead Cup: Second rnd replay". Kent Messenger. 22 March 1985. p. 79 – via British Newspaper Archive.
- First Round: "Results, Fixtures: Results: Saturday: Kent League: Division 1 Cup". Kentish Express. 15 November 1984. p. 47 – via British Newspaper Archive.

== Reserves Section ==
The letter "R" following team names indicates a club's reserves team.

Division Two featured mostly reserves teams (which were not permitted in Division One) from clubs from Kent and the adjacent area whose first team played in Division One and other higher ranked leagues. There was a League Cup competition for the teams in the section.

=== Division Two ===
Kent Football League Division Two
- Season: 1984–85
- Champions: Sheppey United R
- Matches: 271
- Goals: 924 (3.41 per match)

The league featured seventeen clubs (including one non-reserve team, Snowdown Colliery Welfare), thirteen of which had competed in the division the previous season together with four additional clubs

- Sheppey United R, returning following a one season absence
- Canterbury City R joined from the Kent County Amateur League
- Deal Town R joined from the Kent County Amateur League
- Thanet United R, formerly Margate R, joined from the Kent County Amateur League

The division was won by returnees Sheppey United R who completed a league and cup double.

At the end of the season Hastings United R folded and left the league and both bottom clubs, Deal Town R and Whitstable Town R were re-elected to continue their membership of the division.

==== League Table ====
Pos	Team	Pld	W	D	L	GF	GA	GD	Pts	Season End Notes
1	Sheppey United R	32	23	6	3	77	25	+52	75	
2	Ashford Town R	32	19	6	7	61	37	+24	63	
3	Erith & Belvedere R	32	19	4	9	61	33	+28	61	
4	Fisher Athletic R (Note: Fisher Athletic R were deducted nine points and eleven goals, the deducted goals have been reinstated in the table; match versus Herne Bay R not played)	31	19	8	4	79	28	+51	56 (Note: Fisher Athletic R were deducted nine points)	
5	Faversham Town R (Note: Faversham Town R were deducted one goal which has been reinstated in the table)	32	15	6	11	71	56	+15	51	
6	Herne Bay R (Note: Herne Bay R were deducted one goal which has been reinstated in the table; match versus Fisher Athletic R not played)	31	14	8	9	69	55	+14	50	
7	Hythe Town R	32	14	6	12	53	46	+7	48	
8	Snowdown Colliery Welfare	32	12	7	13	44	47	−3	43	
9	Hastings United R	32	12	6	14	43	53	−10	42	Resigned, club folded
10	Sittingbourne R (Note: Sittingbourne R were deducted three points and four goals, the deducted goals have been reinstated in the table)	32	12	7	13	72	61	+11	40 (Note: Sittingbourne R were deducted thee points)	
11	Darenth Heathside R	32	10	9	13	53	47	+6	39	
12	Folkestone R	32	10	7	15	51	76	−25	37	
13	Chatham Town R	32	8	12	12	41	49	−8	36	
14	Thanet United R (Note: Thanet United R were deducted three goals which have been reinstated in the table)	32	8	7	17	39	56	−17	31	
15	Canterbury City R	32	7	6	19	46	71	−25	27	
16	Deal Town R	32	7	5	20	34	87	−53	26	Re-elected
17	Whitstable Town R	32	5	4	23	30	97	−67	19	Re-elected

Source: "Non League Tables for 1984–1985: Kent League Division Two". Non League Matters.
Rules for classification: 1) points; 2) goal difference; 3) number of goals scored.

=== Division Two Cup ===
The 1984–85 Kent Football League Division Two Cup was won by Sheppey United R, who defeated Fisher Athletic R in the final, and completed a league and cup double.
