= 1988–89 Kent Football League =

Association football league season

The 1988–89 Kent Football League season (known as the Winstonlead Kent League for sponsorship reasons) was the twenty-third in the history of the Kent Football League, a football competition featuring teams based in and around the county of Kent in England.

The League structure comprised two divisions: Division One and Division Two with the latter known as the Reserves Section (reserves teams were not permitted in Division One). Additionally there were two league cup competitions: the Challenge Cup for the Division One clubs and another for the teams in Division Two.

== Division One ==
Kent Football League Division One
- Season: 1988–89
- Champions: Hythe Town
- Promoted: Hythe Town
- Matches: 380
- Goals: 1,225 (3.22 per match)

The league featured twenty clubs, nineteen of which competed in the previous season together with one additional club:

- Chatham Town, relegated from the Southern League

The league was won, for the first occasion by Hythe Town - whose reserves team completed a Division Two league and cup double.

At the end of the season champions Hythe Town were promoted to the Southern League Southern Division and both bottom clubs, Chatham Town and Herne Bay, were re-elected to continue their membership of the division.

=== League table ===
| Pos | Team | Pld | W | D | L | GF | GA | GD | Pts | Season End Notes |
|---|---|---|---|---|---|---|---|---|---|---|
| 1 | Hythe Town | 38 | 29 | 3 | 6 | 133 | 41 | +92 | 90 | Promoted to the Southern League Southern Division |
| 2 | Deal Town | 38 | 24 | 4 | 10 | 80 | 35 | +45 | 76 | |
| 3 | Faversham Town | 38 | 22 | 7 | 9 | 68 | 36 | +32 | 73 | |
| 4 | Darenth Heathside | 38 | 20 | 8 | 10 | 69 | 44 | +25 | 68 | |
| 5 | Sittingbourne | 38 | 18 | 12 | 8 | 59 | 43 | +16 | 66 | |
| 6 | Alma Swanley | 38 | 18 | 10 | 10 | 66 | 46 | +20 | 64 | |
| 7 | Cray Wanderers | 38 | 19 | 7 | 12 | 67 | 53 | +14 | 64 | |
| 8 | Whitstable Town | 38 | 18 | 9 | 11 | 75 | 42 | +33 | 63 | |
| 9 | Ramsgate | 38 | 19 | 6 | 13 | 66 | 61 | +5 | 63 | |
| 10 | Slade Green | 38 | 17 | 10 | 11 | 60 | 59 | +1 | 61 | |
| 11 | Tunbridge Wells | 38 | 16 | 8 | 14 | 58 | 57 | +1 | 56 | |
| 12 | Kent Police | 38 | 16 | 5 | 17 | 61 | 74 | −13 | 53 | |
| 13 | Crockenhill | 38 | 11 | 12 | 15 | 52 | 51 | +1 | 45 | |
| 14 | Danson | 38 | 12 | 5 | 21 | 55 | 67 | −12 | 41 | |
| 15 | Metropolitan Police (Hayes) | 38 | 11 | 7 | 20 | 50 | 83 | −33 | 40 | |
| 16 | Greenwich Borough | 38 | 8 | 15 | 15 | 53 | 56 | −3 | 36 (Note: Greenwich Borough were deducted three points.) | |
| 17 | Beckenham Town | 38 | 8 | 10 | 20 | 41 | 68 | −27 | 34 | |
| 18 | Thames Polytechnic | 38 | 8 | 10 | 20 | 44 | 83 | −39 | 34 | |
| 19 | Chatham Town | 38 | 3 | 8 | 27 | 41 | 105 | −64 | 17 | Re-elected |
| 20 | Herne Bay | 38 | 3 | 4 | 31 | 27 | 121 | −94 | 13 | Re-elected |

Source: "Kent League 1966–92: 1988–89". Non League Matters., "England – Kent League: Final Table Kent League (Division 1) '88–'89". The Rec.Sport.Soccer Statistics Foundation.
Rules for classification: 1) points; 2) goal difference; 3) number of goals scored.

=== Challenge Cup ===
The 1988–89 Kent Football League Challenge Cup was won, for the only occasion in their history, by Alma Swanley.

The competition, contested by all twenty clubs in Division One, comprised five single match tie rounds (with the first round featuring four ties) culminating in the final which was played on a neutral ground (at Sittingbourne F.C. this season).

==== Quarter-finals, Semi-finals and Final ====
Quarter-finals
Whitstable Town | 3
Hythe Town | 1
Alma Swanley | 1
Tunbridge Wells | 0
Deal Town | 1
Greenwich Borough | 0
Ramsgate | 2
Danson | 0

Semi-finals
Whitstable Town | 2
Alma Swanley | 4
Deal Town | 0 (Note: After extra time (score at 90 minutes: 0–0)
Ramsgate | 1

Final
Alma Swanley | 1
Ramsgate | 0

==== Second Round ====
- Slade Green 2 – 5 Whitstable Town
- Hythe Town 3 – 0 Kent Police
- Herne Bay 0 – 2 Alma Swanley
- Tunbridge Wells 1 – 0 Thames Polytechnic
- Deal Town 4 – 2 Darenth Heathside
- Metropolitan Police (Hayes) 0 – 3 Greenwich Borough
- Crockenhill 0 – 2 Ramsgate
- Danson 1 – 0 Beckenham Town

==== First Round ====
- Darenth Heathside 2 – 1 Cray Wanderers
- Metropolitan Police (Hayes) 4 – 3 Chatham Town
- Crockenhill 3 – 0 Faversham Town
- Sittingbourne 1 – 2 Danson
- Byes for the other twelve clubs

Sources:

- Final: "Soccer Results and Fixture Guide: Results: Saturday: Winstonlead Kent League Cup final". Kentish Express. 4 May 1989. p. 62 – via British Newspaper Archive.
- Semi-finals: "Soccer Results And Fixtures: Results: Saturday: Winstonlead Kent League Cup, semi-finals". Kentish Express. 16 March 1989. p. 84 – via British Newspaper Archive.
- Quarter-finals: "Soccer Results And Fixtures: Winstonlead League Cup, round 3". Kentish Express. 26 January 1989. p. 63 – via British Newspaper Archive.; "Soccer Results And Fixtures: Winstonlead League Cup". Kentish Express. 9 February 1989. p. 68 – via British Newspaper Archive.
- Second Round: "Soccer Results, Fixtures: Results: Saturday: Kent League Cup, round 2". Kentish Express. 24 November 1988. p. 76 – via British Newspaper Archive.
- First Round: "All the results, fixtures and tables: Winstonlead Kent League Cup, first round". Kentish Gazette. 30 September 1988. p. 86 – via British Newspaper Archive.

== Reserves Section ==
The letter "R" following team names indicates a club's reserves team.

Division Two featured mostly reserves teams (which were not permitted in Division One) from clubs from Kent and the adjacent area whose first team played in Division One and other higher ranked leagues. There was a League Cup competition for the teams in the section.

=== Division Two ===
Kent Football League Division Two
- Season: 1988–89
- Champions: Hythe Town R
- Matches: 342
- Goals: 1,209 (3.54 per match)

The league featured nineteen clubs including one non-reserve team, Snowdown Colliery Welfare for their final season in the league; sixteen of the clubs had competed in the division the previous season together with three additional clubs:

- Chatham Town R
- Cray Wanderers R
- Greenwich Borough R

The division was won by a resurgent Hythe Town R - who had been re-elected to the league after ending the previous season in the bottom two – part of a league and cup double.

At the end of the season: Chatham Town R, Deal Town R and champions Hythe Town R withdrew from the division; Snowdown Colliery Welfare, who were founder members of the league in 1966, had their registration cancelled by the League as the club no longer held the league requirement of Senior status - the Kent County FA had, owing to the club's long spell of ten seasons in Division Two, ruled the club of Intermediate status; bottom club Herne Bay were re-elected to continue their membership of the division.

==== League table ====
| Pos | Team | Pld | W | D | L | GF | GA | GD | Pts | Season End Notes |
|---|---|---|---|---|---|---|---|---|---|---|
| 1 | Hythe Town R | 36 | 27 | 4 | 5 | 112 | 31 | +81 | 79 (Note: Hythe Town R were deducted six points for league rule breaches (cancelling fixtures)) | Resigned |
| 2 | Ashford Town R | 36 | 24 | 4 | 8 | 67 | 32 | +35 | 76 | |
| 3 | Dover Athletic R | 36 | 22 | 7 | 7 | 102 | 45 | +57 | 73 | |
| 4 | Hastings Town R | 36 | 21 | 6 | 9 | 83 | 49 | +34 | 69 | |
| 5 | Sittingbourne R | 36 | 18 | 11 | 7 | 84 | 52 | +32 | 65 | |
| 6 | Sheppey United R | 36 | 19 | 6 | 11 | 89 | 45 | +44 | 63 | |
| 7 | Cray Wanderers R | 36 | 19 | 3 | 14 | 75 | 61 | +14 | 60 | |
| 8 | Ramsgate R | 36 | 16 | 7 | 13 | 65 | 60 | +5 | 55 | |
| 9 | Faversham Town R | 36 | 14 | 10 | 12 | 62 | 57 | +5 | 52 | |
| 10 | Thames Polytechnic R | 36 | 12 | 11 | 13 | 50 | 54 | −4 | 47 | |
| 11 | Greenwich Borough R (Note: Greenwich Borough R were deducted three points and three goals for playing irregularities - the deducted goals have been reinstated in the table) | 36 | 15 | 5 | 16 | 65 | 72 | −7 | 47 (Note: Greenwich Borough R were deducted three points) | |
| 12 | Snowdown Colliery Welfare (Note: Snowdown Colliery Welfare were deducted seven points and seven goals for playing irregularities - the deducted goals have been reinstated in the table) | 36 | 14 | 9 | 13 | 61 | 60 | +1 | 44 (Note: Snowdown Colliery Welfare were deducted seven points) | Registration cancelled |
| 13 | Folkestone R | 36 | 9 | 10 | 17 | 56 | 77 | −21 | 37 | |
| 14 | Beckenham Town R (Note: Beckenham Town R were deducted three points and four goals for playing irregularities - the deducted goals have been reinstated in the table) | 36 | 10 | 8 | 18 | 43 | 67 | −24 | 35 (Note: Beckenham Town R were deducted three points) | |
| 15 | Deal Town R | 36 | 9 | 7 | 20 | 37 | 99 | −62 | 34 | Resigned |
| 16 | Thanet United R (Note: Thanet United R were deducted one goal for playing irregularities - the deducted goal has been reinstated in the table) | 36 | 7 | 9 | 20 | 48 | 79 | −31 | 30 | |
| 17 | Whitstable Town R | 36 | 8 | 6 | 22 | 38 | 74 | −36 | 30 | |
| 18 | Chatham Town R (Note: Chatham Town R were deducted one point and one goal for playing irregularities - the deducted goal has been reinstated in the table) | 36 | 6 | 7 | 23 | 43 | 91 | −48 | 24 (Note: Chatham Town R were deducted one point) | Resigned |
| 19 | Herne Bay R | 36 | 4 | 6 | 26 | 29 | 104 | −75 | 18 | Re-elected |

Source: "Non League Tables for 1988–1989: Kent League Division Two". Non League Matters.; "Final Tables: Winstonlead Kent League Division Two". Kentish Express. 11 May 1989. p. 64 – via British Newspaper Archive. (Note: The source tables are net of the goal deductions to Greenwich Borough R, Beckenham Town R, Snowdown Colliery Welfare, Thanet United R and Chatham Town R)
Rules for classification: 1) points; 2) goal difference; 3) number of goals scored.

=== Division Two Cup ===
The 1988–89 Kent Football League Division Two Cup was won by Hythe Town R part of a league and cup double.

The competition, contested by all nineteen clubs in the division, comprised five single match tie rounds (with the first round featuring three ties) culminating in the final (played at Hythe Town F.C.). this season).

==== Quarter-finals, Semi-finals and Final ====
Quarter-finals
Hythe Town R | 2 (Note: After extra time (score at 90 minutes: 1–1)) | 5
Sheppey United R | 2 | 1
Hastings Town R | 2
Cray Wanderers R | 3
Chatham Town R | 0
Greenwich Borough R | 8
Deal Town R | 1
Folkestone R | 4

Semi-finals
Hythe Town R | 2
Cray Wanderers R | 1
Greenwich Borough R | 0
Folkestone R | 4

Final
Hythe Town R | 3
Folkestone R | 1

==== Second Round ====
- Thames Polytechnic R 0 – 2 Hythe Town R
- Sheppey United R 2 – 1 Snowdown Colliery Welfare
- Hastings Town R 0– 0 Ashford Town R
- Replay: Ashford Town R v Hastings Town R
- Beckenham Town R 0 – 5 Cray Wanderers R
- Chatham Town R 4 – 2 Ramsgate R
- Sittingbourne R 1 – 2 Greenwich Borough R
- Deal Town R W – x Faversham Town R (Match awarded to Deal Town R)
- Dover Athletic R 0 – 1 Folkestone R

==== First Round ====
- Thanet United R 0 – 5 Sheppey United R
- Herne Bay R 1 – 7 Hastings Town R
- Dover Athletic R 4 – 1 Whitstable Town R
- Byes for the other thirteen clubs

Sources:

- Final: "Soccer Results and Fixtures: Results: Saturday: Winstonlead Kent League, Division 2 Cup Final". Kentish Express. 27 April 1989. p. 86 – via British Newspaper Archive.
- Semi-finals: "Soccer Results And Fixtures: Results: Saturday: Winstonlead Kent League Cup, Division 2 Cup, semi-final". Kentish Express. 16 March 1989. p. 84 – via British Newspaper Archive.; "Local Football Results & Fixtures: Results: Saturday: Winstonlead Kent League Division Two Cup Semi-final". Folkestone Herald. 24 March 1989. p. 86 – via British Newspaper Archive.
- Quarter-finals: "Results, fixtures, tables: Results: Wednesday: Winstonlead Kent League: Division 2 Cup third round". Kentish Gazette. 10 February 1989. p. 87 – via British Newspaper Archive.; "Soccer Results And Fixtures: Results: Saturday: Winstonlead Cup, Division 2". Kentish Express. 16 February 1989. p. 69 – via British Newspaper Archive.; "Soccer Results: Winstonlead Kent League: League Cup, division 2, round 3". Kentish Express. 23 February 1989. p. 68 – via British Newspaper Archive.; "Results … fixtures … tables: Results: Wednesday: Winstonlead Kent League: Division 2 Cup, third round replay". Kentish Gazette. 3 March 1989. p. 87 – via British Newspaper Archive.
- Second Round: "Soccer Results And Fixtures: Winston Kent League: Division 2 Cup: Round 2". Kentish Express. 17 November 1988. p. 79 – via British Newspaper Archive.; "Faversham land hefty fine". Kentish Gazette. 30 December 1988. p. 71 – via British Newspaper Archive.; "Ashford Live on Knife Edge". Kentish Express. 12 January 1989. p. 64 – via British Newspaper Archive.; "Herald soccer results service: Wednesday: Results: Winstonlead Kent League Div Two Cup, 2nd round". Folkestone Herald. 20 January 1989. p. 78 – via British Newspaper Archive.
- First Round: "Soccer Results, Fixtures: Winstonlead Kent League: League Cup, round 1". Kentish Express. 20 October 1988. p. 66 – via British Newspaper Archive.; "Soccer Results, Fixtures: Winstonlead Cup, round 1". Kentish Express. 10 November 1988. p. 69 – via British Newspaper Archive.; "Soccer Results And Fixtures: Winston Kent League: Division 2 Cup, round 1". Kentish Express. 17 November 1988. p. 79 – via British Newspaper Archive.
