= 1977–78 Kent Football League =

Association football league season

The 1977–78 Kent Football League season was the twelfth in the history of the Kent Football League, a football competition featuring teams based in and around the county of Kent in England.

The league comprised one division and there was also a league cup competition, the Challenge Cup.

== League table ==
Kent Football League
- Season: 1977–78
- Champions: Faversham Town
- Matches played: 306
- Goals scored: 972 (3.18 per match)

The league featured teams from eighteen clubs, including three reserves teams. Seventeen of the clubs competed in the previous season and they were joined by Hythe Town from the Kent County Amateur League.

The league was won by Faversham Town, they had been champions seven seasons previously.

At the end of the season, following the decision taken in August 1977 to form a Second Division for reserve sides with Division One for 'first teams' only, Dover Reserves, Folkestone & Shepway Reserves and Maidstone United Reserves moved to a newly formed Division Two. The two lowest ranked non-reserve clubs, Slade Green Athletic and Kent Police, were re-elected to continue their membership of the league which was now named Division One.

| Pos | Team | Pld | W | D | L | GF | GA | GD | Pts | Season End Notes |
|---|---|---|---|---|---|---|---|---|---|---|
| 1 | Faversham Town | 34 | 23 | 8 | 3 | 83 | 24 | +59 | 54 | |
| 2 | Sheppey United | 34 | 24 | 5 | 5 | 87 | 32 | +55 | 53 | |
| 3 | Tunbridge Wells | 34 | 21 | 10 | 3 | 84 | 36 | +48 | 52 | |
| 4 | Hythe Town | 34 | 19 | 6 | 9 | 73 | 57 | +16 | 44 | |
| 5 | Maidstone United Reserves | 34 | 18 | 6 | 10 | 46 | 39 | +7 | 42 | Moved to Division Two |
| 6 | Crockenhill | 34 | 15 | 8 | 11 | 62 | 46 | +16 | 38 | |
| 7 | Dartford Glentworth | 34 | 15 | 8 | 11 | 59 | 45 | +14 | 38 | |
| 8 | Medway | 34 | 15 | 8 | 11 | 55 | 49 | +6 | 38 | |
| 9 | Ramsgate | 34 | 12 | 13 | 9 | 54 | 51 | +3 | 37 | |
| 10 | Deal Town | 34 | 13 | 7 | 14 | 47 | 53 | −6 | 33 | |
| 11 | Whitstable Town | 34 | 13 | 6 | 15 | 52 | 43 | +9 | 32 | |
| 12 | Herne Bay | 34 | 10 | 9 | 15 | 43 | 72 | −29 | 29 | |
| 13 | Sittingbourne | 34 | 8 | 9 | 17 | 37 | 60 | −23 | 25 | |
| 14 | Snowdown Colliery Welfare | 34 | 8 | 6 | 20 | 44 | 76 | −32 | 22 | |
| 15 | Slade Green Athletic | 34 | 4 | 12 | 18 | 40 | 60 | −20 | 20 | Re-elected |
| 16 | Folkestone & Shepway Reserves | 34 | 6 | 7 | 21 | 37 | 61 | −24 | 19 | Moved to Division Two |
| 17 | Kent Police | 34 | 6 | 6 | 22 | 34 | 81 | −47 | 18 | Re-elected |
| 18 | Dover Reserves | 34 | 9 | 0 | 25 | 35 | 87 | −52 | 18 | Moved to Division Two |

Source: "How it all finished: Kent League". Kent Messenger. 19 May 1978. p. 75 – via British Newspaper Archive.; "(column 1) Kent League: Final Table". East Kent Times. 24 May 1978. p. 15 – via British Newspaper Archive.
Rules for classification: 1) points; 2) goal difference; 3) number of goals scored.

== Challenge Cup ==
The 1977–78 Kent Football League Challenge Cup was won by Tunbridge Wells, their second win in four seasons.

The competition, contested by all eighteen clubs in the league, comprised five single match tie rounds (with the first round featuring two ties) culminating in the final which was played on a neutral ground (at Sittingbourne this season).

=== Quarter-finals, Semi-finals and Final ===
Quarter-finals
Whitstable Town | 3
Sittingbourne | 1
Sheppey United | 3
Hythe Town | 1
Snowdown Colliery Welfare | 0
Dartford Glentworth | 3
Medway | 2
Tunbridge Wells | 6

Semi-finals
Whitstable Town | 0
Sheppey United | 1
Dartford Glentworth | 0
Tunbridge Wells | 1

Final
Sheppey United | 0
Tunbridge Wells | 1

=== Second Round ===
- Dover Reserves 1 – 4 Whitstable Town
- Sittingbourne 2 – 1 Slade Green Athletic
- Faversham Town 1 – 4 Sheppey United
- Crockenhill 1 – 2 Hythe Town
- Snowdown Colliery Welfare 4 – 0 Herne Bay
- Dartford Glentworth 3 – 1 Maidstone United Reserves
- Kent Police 1 – 2 Medway
- Tunbridge Wells 2 – 1 Deal Town

=== First Round ===
- Folkestone & Shepway Reserves 0 – 1 Faversham Town
- Kent Police 1 – 1 Ramsgate
- REPLAY: Ramsgate 1 – 2 Kent Police
- Byes for the other fourteen clubs

Sources:

- Final: Mighall, John (2 May 1978). "Sheppey Hand it to Big Jim". Evening Post. p. 19 – via British Newspaper Archive.
- Semi-finals: "Football Results: Kent League Cup". Thanet Times. 14 March 1978. p. 30 – via British Newspaper Archive.;
- Quarter-finals: "Results: Kent League Cup". Thanet Times. 17 January 1978. p. 27 – via British Newspaper Archive.;
- Second Round: "All the senior soccer details: Results: Saturday: Kent League Cup 2nd round". Kent Messenger. 7 October 1977. p. 75 – via British Newspaper Archive.; "Senior soccer details: Results: Saturday: Kent League Cup 2nd round". Kent Messenger. 25 November 1977. p. 77 – via British Newspaper Archive.; "Senior soccer details: Results: Saturday: Kent League Cup 2nd round". Kent Messenger. 16 December 1977. p. 67 – via British Newspaper Archive.
- First Round: "All the senior soccer details: Results: Saturday: Kent League Cup 1st round". Kent Messenger. 7 October 1977. p. 75 – via British Newspaper Archive.; "County Soccer Details: Results: Tuesday: Kent League Cup 1st round replay". Kentish Express. 11 November 1977. p. 56 – via British Newspaper Archive.
