= 1982–83 Kent Football League =

Association football league season

The 1982–83 Kent Football League season was the seventeenth in the history of the Kent Football League, a football competition featuring teams based in and around the county of Kent in England.

The League structure comprised two divisions: Division One and Division Two with the latter known as the Reserves Section (reserves teams were not permitted in Division One). Additionally there were two league cup competitions: the Challenge Cup for the Division One clubs and another for the teams in Division Two.

== Division One ==
Kent Football League Division One
- Season: 1982–83
- Champions: Crockenhill
- Promoted: Chatham Town
- Matches: 272
- Goals: 781 (2.87 per match)

The league featured seventeen clubs, fifteen which competed in the previous season together with two additional clubs which both transferred from the London Spartan League:

- Alma Swanley
- Beckenham Town

The league was won by Crockenhill, their only season as champions of the Kent League.

At the end of the season seventh placed team Chatham Town left the league following their election to the Southern Football League.

=== League Table ===
Pos	Team	Pld	W	D	L	GF	GA	GD	Pts	Season End Notes
1	Crockenhill	32	19	6	7	55	26	+29	44	
2	Hythe Town	32	18	7	7	66	37	+29	43	
3	Deal Town	32	15	11	6	51	34	+17	41	
4	Sittingbourne	32	15	10	7	70	33	+37	40	
5	Tunbridge Wells	32	14	9	9	52	46	+6	37	
6	Herne Bay	32	13	10	9	33	32	+1	36	
7	Chatham Town	32	12	11	9	42	36	+6	35	Elected to the Southern League Southern Division
8	Cray Wanderers	32	12	10	10	65	53	+12	34	
9	Beckenham Town	32	12	9	11	46	46	0	33	
10	Sheppey United	32	13	6	13	51	49	+2	32	
11	Alma Swanley	32	12	8	12	50	49	+1	32	
12	Slade Green Athletic	32	12	7	13	41	35	+6	31	
13	Faversham Town	32	11	5	16	40	53	−13	27	
14	Darenth Heathside	32	5	12	15	27	51	−24	22	
15	Whitstable Town	32	6	9	17	36	59	−23	21	
16	Kent Police	32	6	7	19	34	80	−46	19	
17	Ramsgate	32	4	9	19	22	62	−40	17	

Source: "Non League Tables for 1982–1983: Kent League Division One". Non League Matters. with Cray Wanderers goals against totals adjusted by "Latest league tables". Whitstable Times. 20 May 1983. p. 15 – via British Newspaper Archive.
Rules for classification: 1) points; 2) goal difference; 3) number of goals scored.

=== Challenge Cup ===
The 1982–83 Kent Football League Challenge Cup was won by Slade Green Athletic, who defeated Faversham Town in the final, their only winners trophy whilst members of the Kent League. The competition, contested by all seventeen clubs in the league, comprised five single match tie rounds (with only one tie in the first round) culminating in the final.

==== Quarter-finals, Semi-finals and Final ====
Quarter-finals
Ramsgate	1	0 (Note: Replay)
Darenth Heathside	1	1
Crockenhill	0
Faversham Town	1
Slade Green Athletic	1
Hythe Town	0
Sheppey United	2
Herne Bay	0

Semi-finals
Darenth Heathside	1 (Note: After extra time)
Faversham Town	2
Slade Green Athletic	0 (Note: After extra time)	(Note: Replay)
Sheppey United	0

Final
Faversham Town
Slade Green Athletic

==== Second Round ====
- Ramsgate 3 – 2 Deal Town
- Darenth Heathside 2 – 1 Chatham Town
- Sittingbourne 1 – 2 Crockenhill
- Faversham Town 3 – 2 Kent Police
- Cray Wanderers 1 – 3 Slade Green Athletic
- Hythe Town 3 – 2 Tunbridge Wells
- Alma Swanley 1 – 4 Sheppey United
- Herne Bay 1 – 0 Beckenham Town

==== First Round ====
- Whitstable Town 1 – 2 Deal Town
- Byes for the other fifteen teans

Sources:

- Final: "Archives: League Cup Winners". SCEFL: Southern Counties East Football League. February 2022.
- Semi-finals: "Other Results: Kent: League Cup semi-finals". The Sunday People. 3 April 1983. p. 36 – via British Newspaper Archive.
- Quarter-finals: "(column 6) Kent League: League Cup". Sunday Mirror. 27 February 1983. p. 40 – via British Newspaper Archive.; "(column 4) Kent League: League Cup replay". Sunday Mirror. 6 March 1983. p. 41 – via British Newspaper Archive.
- Second Round: "Results: Saturday: Kent League Cup, Division 1, Round 2". Kentish Express. 1 October 1982. p. 22 – via British Newspaper Archive.
- First Round: "A Mills nightmare ends League Cup dream". Whitstable Times. 3 September 1982. p. 15 – via British Newspaper Archive.

== Reserves Section ==
The letter "R" following team names indicates a club's reserves team.

Division Two featured mostly reserves teams (which were not permitted in Division One) from clubs from Kent and the adjacent area whose first team played in Division One and other higher ranked leagues. There was a League Cup competition for the teams in the section.

=== Division Two ===
Kent Football League Division Two
- Season: 1982–83
- Champions: Maidstone United R
- Matches: 305
- Goals: 1,125 (3.69 per match)

The league featured eighteen clubs (including one non-reserve team, Snowdown Colliery Welfare), sixteen of which had competed in the division the previous season with two additional clubs:

- Beckenham Town R
- Faversham Town R, returning after a one season absence.

The division was won by Maidstone United R for the second successive season.

At the end of the season four clubs left the league: Sheppey United R, and three who joined the Essex and Herts Border Combination: Dartford R, champions Maidstone United R and Welling United R.

==== League Table ====
Pos	Team	Pld	W	D	L	GF	GA	GD	Pts	Season End Notes
1	Maidstone United R	34	25	5	4	106	42	+64	55	Resigned
2	Welling United R	34	23	7	4	85	32	+53	53	Resigned
3	Erith & Belvedere R	34	20	8	6	87	39	+48	48	
4	Sheppey United R	34	16	6	12	69	62	+7	38	Resigned
5	Darenth Heathside R	34	14	9	11	51	43	+8	37	
6	Beckenham Town R (Note: missing Beckenham Town R versus Dover R)	33	13	9	11	56	51	+5	35	
7	Faversham Town R	34	14	7	13	49	54	−5	35	
8	Sittingbourne R	34	15	5	14	67	71	−4	35	
9	Herne Bay R	34	13	9	12	62	73	−11	35	
10	Chatham Town R	34	12	9	13	48	43	+5	33	
11	Dover R	33	12	9	12	53	53	0	33	
12	Ashford Town R	34	10	12	12	56	57	−1	32	
13	Hastings United R	34	11	9	14	68	81	−13	31	
14	Dartford R	34	10	9	15	75	80	−5	29	Resigned
15	Hythe Town R	34	9	7	18	51	62	−11	25	
16	Folkestone R	34	9	5	20	61	94	−33	23	
17	Snowdown Colliery Welfare	34	4	10	20	42	89	−47	18	
18	Whitstable Town R	34	4	7	23	39	99	−60	15	

Source: "Non League Tables for 1982–1983: Kent League Division Two". Non League Matters.
Rules for classification: 1) points; 2) goal difference; 3) number of goals scored.

=== Division Two Cup ===
The 1982–83 Kent Football League Division Two Cup was won by Erith & Belvedere R who defeated Hythe Town R in the final.
