= 1970–71 Kent Football League =

Association football league season

The 1970–71 Kent Football League season was the fifth in the history of the Kent Football League, a football competition based in and around the county of Kent in England.

The league comprised one division and there was also a league cup competition, the Challenge Cup.

== Kent Football League ==
Kent Football League
- Season: 1970–71
- Champions: Faversham Town
- Matches played: 380
- Goals scored: 1,421 (3.74 per match)

The league featured teams from 20 clubs including nine reserves teams. Fifteen of the clubs had competed in the league the previous season and they were joined by five additional clubs:

- Slade Green Athletic, joined from the Greater London League
- Ashford Town Reserves, rejoining after two years absence
- Bexley United Reserves, rejoining after two years absence
- Hastings United Reserves
- Tonbridge Reserves, rejoining after an absence of one year

Also, Tunnel sports changed their name to Dartford Amateurs.

The league was won for a second successive season by Faversham Town, who completed a League and Cup double.

At the end of the season three clubs left the league: champions Faversham Town left to join the newly formed Metropolitan–London League; Snowdown Colliery Welfare resigned to the Kent County Amateur League owing to financial conderations; and Deal Town Reserves resigned, to be replaced by their first team.

=== League table ===
Pos	Team	Pld	W	D	L	GF	GA	GAv	Pts	Season End Notes
1	Faversham Town	38	28	5	5	116	37	3.135	61	Transferred to the Metropolitan–London League
2	Chatham Town	38	23	8	7	102	52	1.962	54	
3	Tonbridge Reserves	38	22	9	7	101	51	1.980	53	
4	Sittingbourne	38	21	8	9	95	57	1.667	50	
5	Margate Reserves	38	18	5	15	66	71	0.930	41	
6	Bexley United Reserves	38	15	11	12	64	72	0.889	41	
7	Snowdown Colliery Welfare	38	18	4	16	77	63	1.222	40	Resigned to Kent County Amateur League
8	Brett Sports	38	16	7	15	68	67	1.015	39	
9	Slade Green Athletic	38	16	6	16	50	68	0.735	38	
10	Ashford Town Reserves	38	15	7	16	98	73	1.342	37	
11	Kent Police	38	12	13	13	73	78	0.936	37	
12	Hastings United Reserves	38	14	9	15	61	67	0.910	37	
13	Tunbridge Wells	38	14	8	16	63	64	0.984	36	
14	Whitstable Town	38	13	9	16	67	72	0.931	35	
15	Dartford Amateurs	38	13	7	18	68	66	1.030	33	
16	Ramsgate Athletic Reserves	38	13	5	20	59	80	0.738	31	
17	Sheppey United Reserves	38	11	9	18	57	79	0.722	31	
18	Folkestone Reserves	38	11	5	22	53	101	0.525	27	
19	Crockenhill	38	6	8	24	49	113	0.434	20	
20	Deal Town Reserves	38	5	9	24	34	90	0.378	19	Resigned (replaced by first team)

Source: "Kent League: Final Table 1970/71". Faversham News. 4 June 1971. p. 12 – via British Newspaper Archive. with Crockenhill goals against total adjusted by results: Sheppey United 3–1 Crockenhill & Slade Green 2–1 Crockenhill, applied to balanced table at "Details: Kent League". Kent Messenger]. 28 May 1971. p. 14 – via British Newspaper Archive.
Rules for classification: 1) points; 2) goal average; 3) number of goals scored.

=== Challenge Cup ===
The 1970–71 Kent Football League Challenge Cup was won by Faversham Town, who completed a League and Cup double.

The competition comprised five single match tie rounds. All twenty clubs contested the first round; in the second round six clubs received byes to produce eight competitors for the quarter finals. The final was played on a neutral ground (at Sittingbourne F.C. this season).

==== Quarter-finals, Semi-finals and Final ====
Quarter-finals
Dartford Amateurs	2
Ramsgate Athletic Reserves	1
Faversham Town	2
Bexley United Reserves	1
Kent Police	2	0 (Note: Replay)
Hastings United Reserves	2	1
Brett Sports	5
Tunbridge Wells	2

Semi-finals
Dartford Amateurs	0
Faversham Town	1
Hastings United Reserves	1
Brett Sports	0

Final
Faversham Town	2
Hastings United Reserves	1

==== Second Round ====
- Whitstable Town 2 – 3 Bexley United Reserves
- Tunbridge Wells 4 – 3 Chatham Town
- Byes for the other six clubs

==== First Round ====
- Snowdown Colliery Welfare 0 – 1 Dartford Amateurs
- Ramsgate Athletic Reserves 5 – 2 Slade Green Athletic
- Faversham Town 2 – 1 Folkestone Reserves
- Deal Town Reserves 2 – 3 Bexley United Reserves
- Crockenhill 0 – 1 Kent Police
- Sittingbourne 1 – 2 Hastings United Reserves
- Brett Sports 2 – 0 Ashford Town Reserves
- Tunbridge Wells 2 – 0 Margate Reserves
- Chatham Town 1 – 1 Sheppey United Reserves
- REPLAY: Sheppey United Reserves 0 – 3 Chatham Town
- Whitstable Town 2 – 1 Tonbridge Reserves

Sources:

- Final: "Results: Kent League Cup (Final)". Thanet Times. 4 May 1971. p. 14 – via British Newspaper Archive.
- Semi-finals: "County Details: Results: Saturday: League Cup semi-finals". Kent Messenger. 19 March 1971. p. 16 – via British Newspaper Archive.
- Quarter-finals: "County Details: Results: Saturday: League Cup quarter-finals". Kent Messenger. 12 February 1971. p. 12 – via British Newspaper Archive.; "Results: Kent League Cup (replay)". Thanet Times. 16 February 1971. p. 16 – via British Newspaper Archive.
- Second Round: "Results and Fixtures: Kent League Cup (2nd round)". Faversham News. 18 December 1970. p. 12 – via British Newspaper Archive.
- First Round: "Kent League". Kentish Express. 23 October 1970. p. 21 – via British Newspaper Archive.; "Reserves' uphill battle goes to Chaham". Sheerness Times-Guardian. 30 October 1970. p. 9 – via British Newspaper Archive.; "County Details: Results: Saturday: Kent League Cup 1st Round". Kent Messenger. 13 November 1970. p. 12 – via British Newspaper Archive.; "County Details: Results: Wednesday: Kent League Cup 1st Round". Kent Messenger. 13 November 1970. p. 12 – via British Newspaper Archive.
