= 1973–74 Kent Football League =

Association football league season

The 1973–74 Kent Football League season was the eighth in the history of the Kent Football League, a football competition featuring teams based in and around the county of Kent in England.

The league comprised one division and there was also a league cup competition, the Challenge Cup.

== League table ==
Kent Football League
- Season: 1973–74
- Champions: Chatham Town
- Matches played: 342
- Goals scored: 1,159 (3.39 per match)

The league featured teams from 19 clubs, including eight reserves teams. Eighteen of the clubs had competed in the league the previous season and they were joined by Canterbury City Reserves.

The league was won by Chatham Town, for the second time in three seasons.

At the end of the season Bexley United Reserves resigned from the league and both bottom clubs, Snowdown Colliery Welfare and Folkestone Reserves, were re-elected to continue their membership of the league.

Pos	Team	Pld	W	D	L	GF	GA	GAv	Pts	Season End Notes
1	Chatham Town	36	29	4	3	113	31	3.645	62	
2	Sittingbourne	36	27	5	4	97	29	3.345	59	
3	Sheppey United	36	19	9	8	80	41	1.951	47	
4	Bexley United Reserves	36	16	8	12	57	51	1.118	40	Resigned from the league
5	Dartford Amateurs	36	15	9	12	76	66	1.152	39	
6	Crockenhill	36	14	9	13	55	55	1.000	37	
7	Margate Reserves	36	14	9	13	64	64	1.000	37	
8	Tunbridge Wells	36	15	6	15	71	54	1.315	36	
9	Deal Town	36	14	8	14	59	56	1.054	36	
10	Kent Police	36	13	9	14	57	60	0.950	35	
11	Whitstable Town	36	13	9	14	52	57	0.912	35	
12	Slade Green Athletic	36	11	11	14	55	73	0.753	33	
13	Tonbridge Reserves	36	14	5	17	38	54	0.704	33	
14	Canterbury City Reserves	36	12	7	17	50	62	0.806	31	
15	Ashford Town Reserves	36	10	11	15	64	80	0.800	31	
16	Dover Reserves	36	8	11	17	45	70	0.643	25 (Note: Dover Reserves were deducted two points for playing an ineligible player.)	
17	Ramsgate Reserves	36	11	2	23	42	78	0.538	24	
18	Snowdown Colliery Welfare	36	8	8	20	45	88	0.511	24	Re-elected
19	Folkestone Reserves	36	7	4	25	39	90	0.433	18	Re-elected

Source: "Kent League Tables: Kent League '73–'74". SCEFL. 7 May 2022. & "Kent League". Kent & Sussex Courier. 31 May 1974. p. 29 – via British Newspaper Archive. (for adjusted Tonbridge R goals against total)
Rules for classification: 1) points; 2) goal average.

== Challenge Cup ==
The 1973–74 Kent Football League Challenge Cup was won by Sittingbourne.

The competition, contested by all nineteen clubs in the league, comprised five single match tie rounds culminating in the final which was played on a neutral ground (at Sheppey United F.C. this season).

=== Quarter-finals, Semi-finals and Final ===
Quarter-finals
Slade Green Athletic	2	0 (Note: Replay)
Snowdown Colliery Welfare	2	1
Sittingbourne	4
Ashford Town Reserves	0
Kent Police	1
Dartford Amateurs	2
Sheppey United	2	1 (Note: Replay)
Chatham Town	2	2

Semi-finals
Snowdown Colliery Welfare	0
Sittingbourne	3
Dartford Amateurs	1	1 (Note: Replay)
Chatham Town	1	2

Final
Sittingbourne	2
Chatham Town	1

=== Second Round ===
- Dover Reserves 0 – 0 Slade Green Athletic
- REPLAY: Slade Green Athletic 2 – 1 Dover Reserves
- Tunbridge Wells 1 – 1 Snowdown Colliery Welfare
- REPLAY: *Snowdown Colliery Welfare 1 – 0 Tunbridge Wells
- Crockenhill 1 – 4 Sittingbourne
- Margate Reserves 2 – 3 Ashford Town Reserves
- Kent Police 3 – 1 Bexley United Reserves
- Dartford Amateurs 4 – 0 Ramsgate Reserves
- Canterbury City Reserves 0 – 1 Sheppey United
- Chatham Town 2 – 1 Deal Town

=== First Round ===
- Margate Reserves 4 – 1 Folkestone Reserves
- Sittingbourne 4 – 1 Whitstable Town
- Canterbury City Reserves 1 – 0 Tonbridge Reserves
- Byes for the other thirteen clubs

Sources:

- Final: "Other Football: Kent League Cup-Final". Sunday Mirror. 12 May 1974. p. 45 – via British Newspaper Archive.
- Semi-finals: "Results: Kent League Cup". Thanet Times. 9 April 1974. p. 22 – via British Newspaper Archive.; "Results: Kent League Cup". Thanet Times. 23 April 1974. p. 19 – via British Newspaper Archive.
- Quarter-finals: "Replay sets Pulley a poser: Saturday's results: Kent League Cup". Evening Post. 4 March 1974. p. 28 – via British Newspaper Archive.; "Results: Kent League Cup". Thanet Times. 12 March 1974. p. 18 – via British Newspaper Archive.; "Results: Kent League Cup". Thanet Times. 19 March 1974. p. 20 – via British Newspaper Archive.
- Second Round: "Double Chasing: Saturday's results: Kent League Cup". Evening Post. 7 January 1974. p. 18 – via British Newspaper Archive.; "Sheppey falling out of race: Saturday's results: Kent League Cup". Evening Post. 14 January 1974. p. 18 – via British Newspaper Archive.; "Bourne pull away: Saturday's results:Kent League Cup". Evening Post. 4 February 1974. p. 24 – via British Newspaper Archive.; "Kent League: Results". Sheerness Times Guardian. 15 February 1974. p. 10 – via British Newspaper Archive.; "All the County details: Results: Saturday: Kent League Cup 2nd round". Kentish Express. 22 February 1974. p. 14 – via British Newspaper Archive.; "Results: Kent League Cup". Thanet Times. 26 February 1974. p. 16 – via British Newspaper Archive.; "Replay sets Pulley a poser: Saturday's results: Kent League Cup". Evening Post. 4 March 1974. p. 28 – via British Newspaper Archive.
- First Round: "All the County football details: Results: Saturday: Kent League Cup 1st round". Kent Messenger. 2 November 1973. p. 16 – via British Newspaper Archive.; "Results: Kent League Cup". Thanet Times. 6 November 1973. p. 18 – via British Newspaper Archive.
