= 1974–75 Kent Football League =

Association football league season

The 1974–75 Kent Football League season was the ninth in the history of the Kent Football League, a football competition featuring teams based in and around the county of Kent in England.

The league comprised one division and there was also a league cup competition, the Challenge Cup.

== League table ==
Kent Football League
- Season: 1974–75
- Champions: Sheppey United
- Matches played: 342
- Goals scored: 1,169 (3.42 per match)

The league featured teams from 19 clubs, including seven reserves teams. Eighteen of the clubs had competed in the league the previous season and they were joined by Herne Bay who joined from the Athenian League

Two teams adopted names of the newly formed local government districts in which they were situated: Chatham Town were renamed Medway; Folkestone Reserves were renamed Folkestone & Shepway Reserves.

The league was won by Sheppey United, their second league title in three years.

At the end of the season, after two seasons in the division, Canterbury City Reserves resigned from the league and both bottom clubs, Dover Reserves and Folkestone & Shepway Reserves, were re-elected to continue their membership of the league.

Pos	Team	Pld	W	D	L	GF	GA	GAv	Pts	Season End Notes
1	Sheppey United	36	27	8	1	99	37	2.676	62	
2	Medway	36	27	3	6	93	32	2.906	57	
3	Sittingbourne	36	26	2	8	90	37	2.432	54	
4	Crockenhill	36	24	5	7	88	40	2.200	53	
5	Dartford Amateurs	36	19	8	9	71	46	1.543	46	
6	Tunbridge Wells	36	20	5	11	67	48	1.396	45	
7	Tonbridge Reserves	36	19	6	11	63	48	1.313	44	
8	Whitstable Town	36	15	12	9	60	58	1.034	42	
9	Deal Town	36	14	8	14	72	63	1.143	36	
10	Herne Bay	36	12	7	17	56	65	0.862	31	
11	Ramsgate Reserves	36	12	6	18	59	70	0.843	30	
12	Margate Reserves	36	11	7	18	47	73	0.644	29	
13	Ashford Town Reserves	36	11	6	19	54	73	0.740	28	
14	Kent Police	36	11	5	20	49	61	0.803	27	
15	Snowdown Colliery Welfare	36	7	12	17	46	83	0.554	26	
16	Canterbury City Reserves	36	9	6	21	61	88	0.693	24	Resigned from the league
17	Slade Green Athletic	36	7	8	21	37	73	0.507	22	
18	Dover Reserves	36	7	7	22	34	75	0.453	21	Re-elected
19	Folkestone & Shepway Reserves	36	2	3	31	23	99	0.232	7	Re-elected

Source: "Kent League Tables: Kent League '74–'75". SCEFL. 7 May 2022.
Rules for classification: 1) points; 2) goal average.

== Challenge Cup ==
The 1974–75 Kent Football League Challenge Cup was won by Tunbridge Wells.

The competition, contested by all nineteen clubs in the league, comprised five single match tie rounds culminating in the final which was played on a neutral ground (at Sheppey United F.C. this season).

=== Quarter-finals, Semi-finals and Final ===
Quarter-finals
Medway	3
Slade Green Athletic	1
Dartford Amateurs	0
Sittingbourne	1
Sheppey United	0
Tunbridge Wells	1
Margate Reserves	2	3 (Note: Replay)
Snowdown Colliery Welfare	2	2

Semi-finals
Medway	2	2 (Note: Replay)
Sittingbourne	2	4
Tunbridge Wells	5
Margate Reserves	1

Final
Sittingbourne	0
Tunbridge Wells	1

=== Second Round ===
- Herne Bay 2 – 2 Medway
- REPLAY: Medway 2 – 0 Herne Bay
- Slade Green Athletic 3 – 1 Ramsgate Reserves
- Folkestone & Shepway Reserves 0 – 3 Dartford Amateurs
- Deal Town 1 – 4 Sittingbourne
- Sheppey United 1 – 0 Canterbury City Reserves
- Kent Police 0 – 1 Tunbridge Wells
- Dover Reserves 1 – 1 Margate Reserves
- REPLAY: Margate Reserves 3 – 1 Dover Reserves
- Snowdown Colliery Welfare 3 – 2 Ashford Town Reserves

=== First Round ===
- Sheppey United 0 – 0 Tonbridge Reserves
- REPLAY: Tonbridge Reserves 1 – 2 Sheppey United
- Kent Police 4 – 2 Crockenhill
- Whitstable Town 1 – 1 Snowdown Colliery Welfare
- REPLAY: Snowdown Colliery Welfare 3 – 1 Whitstable Town
- Byes for the other thirteen clubs

Sources:

- Final: "Sheppey holds final". Sheerness Times Guardian. 16 May 1975. p. 39 – via British Newspaper Archive.
- Semi-finals: "Results: Kent League Cup". Thanet Times. 15 April 1975. p. 20 – via British Newspaper Archive.; Carpenter, Gordon (18 April 1975). "It's Bourne, Hook line'n sinker". Evening Post. p. 35 – via British Newspaper Archive.
- Quarter-finals: "Results: Kent League Cup". Thanet Times. 11 March 1975. p. 16 – via British Newspaper Archive.; "Results: Kent League Cup". Thanet Times. 18 March 1975. p. 20 – via British Newspaper Archive.
- Second Round: "Results: Kent League Cup". Thanet Times. 14 January 1975. p. 20 – via British Newspaper Archive.; "County Soccer Details: Results: Monday: Kent League Cup, 2nd round". Kentish Express. 17 January 1975. p. 14 – via British Newspaper Archive.; "Results: Kent League Cup". Thanet Times. 4 February 1975. p. 14 – via British Newspaper Archive.; "County Soccer Details: Results: Wednesday: Kent League Cup, 2nd round replay". Kent Messenger. 7 February 1975. p. 12 – via British Newspaper Archive.; "Results: Kent League Cup". Thanet Times. 18 February 1975. p. 14 – via British Newspaper Archive.
- First Round: "Results: Kent League Cup". Thanet Times. 12 November 1974. p. 16 – via British Newspaper Archive.; "Sheppey sail on". Evening Post. 13 November 1974. p. 23 – via British Newspaper Archive.; "Results: Kent League Cup". Thanet Times. 26 November 1974. p. 16 – via British Newspaper Archive.
