= 1976–77 Kent Football League =

Association football league season

The 1976–77 Kent Football League season was the eleventh in the history of the Kent Football League, a football competition featuring teams based in and around the county of Kent in England.

The league comprised one division and there was also a league cup competition, the Challenge Cup.

== League table ==
Kent Football League
- Season: 1976–77
- Champions: Medway
- Matches played: 271
- Goals scored: 846 (3.12 per match)

The league featured teams from seventeen clubs, including three reserves teams. Fifteen of the clubs competed in the previous season together with two additional teams:

- Faversham Town joined from the Athenian League.
- Ramsgate joined from the Southern League and replaced their reserves team.

The Dartford Amateurs team from the previous season was renamed Dartford Glentworth.

The league was won by Medway, their third league title in six seasons and part of a league and cup double – a feat they had previously achieved (when named Chatham Town) in the 1971–72 season.

At the end of the season both bottom clubs applied for re-election: Slade Green Athletic were successful; Folkestone & Shepway Reserves were initially refused (perceived to be part of the League's agenda to remove reserves teams from the division) however following an appeal to the Kent County FA they were reinstated.

Pos	Team	Pld	W	D	L	GF	GA	GAv	Pts	Season End Notes
1	Medway	32	25	5	2	93	24	3.875	55	
2	Sittingbourne	32	21	5	6	68	48	1.417	47	
3	Dartford Glentworth (Note: Maidstone United Reserves versus Dartford Glentworth match not played.)	31	19	7	5	57	35	1.629	45	
4	Sheppey United	32	17	8	7	70	37	1.892	42	
5	Faversham Town	32	16	7	9	53	28	1.893	39	
6	Kent Police	32	14	11	7	53	39	1.359	39	
7	Maidstone United Reserves	31	15	7	9	56	43	1.302	37	
8	Deal Town	32	13	9	10	50	44	1.136	35	
9	Crockenhill	32	14	5	13	54	51	1.059	33	
10	Ramsgate	32	14	3	15	47	53	0.887	31	
11	Tunbridge Wells	32	9	6	17	60	69	0.870	24	
12	Whitstable Town	32	10	4	18	37	54	0.685	24	
13	Snowdown Colliery Welfare	32	5	13	14	29	52	0.558	23	
14	Herne Bay	32	8	5	19	37	69	0.536	21	
15	Dover Reserves	32	5	10	17	24	52	0.462	20	
16	Slade Green Athletic	32	7	4	21	36	71	0.507	18	Re-elected
17	Folkestone & Shepway Reserves	32	2	5	25	32	87	0.368	9	Re-elected (following appeal)

Source: "Kent League Tables: Kent League '76–'77". SCEFL. 7 May 2022.
Rules for classification: 1) points; 2) goal average.

== Challenge Cup ==
The 1976–77 Kent Football League Challenge Cup was won by Medway who completed a league and cup double – a feat they had previously achieved (when named Chatham Town) in the 1971–72 season.

The competition, contested by all seventeen clubs in the league, comprised five single match tie rounds (with the first round featuring one tie) culminating in a drawn final (played at Sittingbourne) which required a replay (played at Sheppey United) to decide the winner.

=== Quarter-finals, Semi-finals and Final ===
Quarter-finals
Medway	2
Sheppey United	1
Deal Town	1
Maidstone United Reserves	0
Herne Bay	0
Faversham Town	2
Dartford Glentworth	5
Folkestone & Shepway Reserves	0

Semi-finals
Medway	5
Deal Town	0
Faversham Town	0	1 (Note: Replay)
Dartford Glentworth	0	2

Final
Medway	3 (Note: After extra time)	3 (Note: Replay)
Dartford Glentworth	3	1

=== Second Round ===
- Tunbridge Wells 0 – 1 Medway
- Sheppey United 3 – 0 Snowdown Colliery Welfare
- Dover Reserves 2 – 2 Deal Town
- REPLAY: Deal Town 3 – 1 Dover Reserves
- Crockenhill 1 – 1 Maidstone United Reserves
- REPLAY: (played at Crockenhill) Maidstone United Reserves 4 – 3 (aet) Crockenhill (score at 90 minutes 1–1)
- Herne Bay 4 – 1 Slade Green Athletic
- Faversham Town 0 – 0 Sittingbourne
- REPLAY: Sittingbourne 0 – 2 Faversham Town
- Dartford Glentworth 0 – 0 Whitstable Town
- REPLAY: Whitstable Town 0 – 3 Dartford Glentworth
- Folkestone & Shepway Reserves 4 – 1 Kent Police

=== First Round ===
- Herne Bay 3 – 1 Ramsgate
- Byes for the other fifteen clubs

Sources:

- Final: Richards, Brian (9 May 1977). "What a Pity This Show Had To End!". Evening Post. p. 17 – via British Newspaper Archive.; Richards, Brian (16 May 1977). "It's a Medway Double!". Evening Post. p. 19 – via British Newspaper Archive.
- Semi-finals: "Senior soccer details: Results: Saturday: Kent League Cup semi-final". Kent Messenger. 7 April 1977. p. 75 – via British Newspaper Archive.; "Senior soccer details: Results: Saturday: Kent League Cup semi-final". Kent Messenger. 15 April 1977. p. 75 – via British Newspaper Archive.; "Soccer Results: Kent League Cup". Thanet Times. 19 April 1977. p. 23 – via British Newspaper Archive.;
- Quarter-finals: "Results: Kent League Cup". Thanet Times. 8 March 1977. p. 23 – via British Newspaper Archive.; "Senior soccer details: Results: Saturday: Kent League Cup 3rd round". Kent Messenger. 25 March 1977. p. 77 – via British Newspaper Archive.
- Second Round: "Senior Soccer Details: Results: Saturday: Kent League Cup 2nd round". Kent Messenger. 21 January 1977. p. 14 – via British Newspaper Archive.; "County Soccer Details: Results: Saturday: Kent League Cup, 2nd round replay". Kentish Express. 28 January 1977. p. 24 – via British Newspaper Archive.; "Senior Soccer Details: Results: Wednesday: Kent League Cup 2nd round". Kent Messenger. 11 February 1977. p. 72 – via British Newspaper Archive.; "Results: Kent League Cup". Thanet Times. 15 February 1977. p. 23 – via British Newspaper Archive.; "Fixtues. . .results. . .tables: Results: Saturday: Kent League Cup 2nd round". Kent Messenger. 25 February 1977. p. 72 – via British Newspaper Archive.; "Fixtues. . .results. . .tables: Results: Wednesday: Kent League Cup 2nd round". Kent Messenger. 25 February 1977. p. 72 – via British Newspaper Archive.;"Results: Kent League Cup". Thanet Times. 8 March 1977. p. 23 – via British Newspaper Archive.
- First Round: "Saturday soccer results: Kent League Cup". Thanet Times. 7 December 1976. p. 51 – via British Newspaper Archive.
