= 2013–14 FA Trophy =

FA Challenge Trophy

Tournament details
- Country: England; Guernsey; Wales
- Teams: 276

Final positions
- Champions: Cambridge United (1st title)
- Runners-up: Gosport Borough

The 2013–14 FA Trophy was the 44th season of the FA Trophy, the Football Association's cup competition for teams at levels 5–8 of the English football league system. A total of 276 clubs entered the competition, which was won by Cambridge United, who beat Gosport Borough 4–0 in front of 18,120 spectators at Wembley.

== Calendar ==
Round	Date	Matches	Clubs	New entries this round	Prize money
Preliminary round	5 October 2013	64	276 → 212	128	£2,500
First round qualifying	19 October 2013	72	212 → 140	80	£2,700
Second round qualifying	2 November 2013	36	140 → 104	none	£3,250
Third round qualifying	16 November 2013	40	104 → 64	44	£4,000
First round proper	30 November 2013	32	64 → 32	24	£5,000
Second round proper	14 December 2013	16	32 → 16	none	£6,000
Third round proper	11 January 2014	8	16 → 8	none	£7,000
Fourth round proper	1 February 2014	4	8 → 4	none	£8,000
Semi-finals	15 February and 22 February 2014	2	4 → 2	none	£16,000
Final	23 March 2014	1	2 → 1	none	Runner-up £25,000 Winner £50,000

== Preliminary round ==
Ties will be played on 5 October 2013.

Tie no	Home team	Score	Away team	Attendance
1	Brigg Town	2–1	Bamber Bridge	71
2	Northwich Victoria	3–1	Salford City	135
3	Prescot Cables	0–1	Scarborough Athletic	192
4	Warrington Town	1–2	Ramsbottom United	103
5	Goole	1–5	Burscough	95
6	Kendal Town	3–2	Farsley	153
7	Wakefield	2–1	Harrogate Railway Athletic	51
8	Clitheroe	3–3	Radcliffe Borough	174
replay	Radcliffe Borough	3–0	Clitheroe	107
9	Ossett Town	1–6	Darlington 1883	408
10	Padiham	1–2	Sheffield	202
11	Ossett Albion	1–3	Curzon Ashton	94
12	Lancaster City	6–0	New Mills	163
13	Lincoln United	1–2	Cammell Laird	72
14	Soham Town Rangers	1–0	Newcastle Town	112
15	Kettering Town	1–1	Romulus	561
replay	Romulus	1–2	Kettering Town	98
16	Carlton Town	2–2	Gresley	114
replay	Gresley	2–0	Carlton Town	211
17	Stratford Town	2–2	Coalville Town	223
replay	Coalville Town	3–1	Stratford Town	144
18	Eastwood Town	0–3	Halesowen Town	145
19	Chasetown	2–1	Rugby Town	254
20	Evesham United	3–1	Market Drayton Town	152
21	Daventry Town	1–0	Sutton Coldfield Town	99
22	Belper Town	2–0	Loughborough Dynamo	152
23	Kidsgrove Athletic	3–1	Bedworth United	82
24	Rainworth Miners Welfare	0–1	St. Ives Town	132
25	VCD Athletic	2–2	Aylesbury	74
replay	Aylesbury	2–1	VCD Athletic	63
26	Redbridge	2–3	Chatham Town	93
27	Ware	1–1	Witham Town	66
replay	Witham Town	4–2	Ware	77
28	Sittingbourne	1–5	Whitstable Town	212
29	Leighton Town	0–3	North Greenford United	92
30	Redhill	1–3	Burnham Ramblers	86
31	Royston Town	1–3	Three Bridges	160
32	Aylesbury United	4–2	Faversham Town	134

Tie no	Home team	Score	Away team	Attendance
33	Dunstable Town	4–1	Erith & Belvedere	56
34	Tooting & Mitcham United	1–2	Eastbourne Town	126
35	Barton Rovers	0–3	Peacehaven & Telscombe	90
36	Herne Bay	0–0	Merstham	208
replay	Merstham	0–2	Herne Bay	101
37	Thurrock	2–0	Corinthian-Casuals	80
38	Waltham Abbey	2–1	Walton & Hersham	97
39	Uxbridge	1–2	Heybridge Swifts	87
40	Potters Bar Town	2–0	Romford	89
41	Burgess Hill Town	1–1	Wroxham	160
replay	Wroxham	3–2	Burgess Hill Town	105
42	Tilbury	3–0	Needham Market	89
43	AFC Sudbury	2–0	Worthing	241
44	Folkestone Invicta	6–0	Waltham Forest	186
45	Walton Casuals	1–1	Crawley Down Gatwick	104
replay	Crawley Down Gatwick	1–0	Walton Casuals	59
46	Horsham	4–1	Chipstead	215
47	Hythe Town	2–1	Aveley	162
48	Barkingside	0–6	Guernsey	205
49	Hastings United	3–2	Brentwood Town	344
50	Northwood	2–3	AFC Hayes	59
51	Leatherhead	4–0	Harlow Town	196
52	Mangotsfield United	3–1	Thatcham Town	109
53	Chalfont St Peter	1–1	Bridgwater Town	53
replay	Bridgwater Town	3–3†	Chalfont St Peter	237
Bridgwater Town advance 5–3 on penalties.
54	Fleet Town	0–3	Clevedon Town	67
55	Didcot Town	1–1	Cirencester Town	108
replay	Cirencester Town	7–1	Didcot Town	75
56	Merthyr Town	0–0	Yate Town	105
replay	Yate Town	1–2	Merthyr Town	175
57	Swindon Supermarine	3–0	Taunton Town	105
58	Guildford City	3–4	Chertsey Town	96
59	Tiverton Town	1–0	Cinderford Town	147
60	Godalming Town	1–2	Slough Town	300
61	Bishop's Cleeve	1–4	Paulton Rovers	93
62	Egham Town	3–2	Ashford Town (Middlesex)	83
63	Wimborne Town	3–5	Marlow	151
64	Shortwood United	3–1	Beaconsfield SYCOB	87

† – After extra time

== First round qualifying ==
Ties will be played on 19 October 2013. Teams from Premier Division of Southern League, Northern Premier League and Isthmian League entered in this round.

Tie no	Home team	Score	Away team	Attendance
1	Trafford	6–1	Wakefield	159
2	Whitby Town	0–1	Chorley	219
3	Frickley Athletic	1–2	Brigg Town	136
4	Cammell Laird	0–1	Curzon Ashton	48
5	AFC Fylde	1–1	Kendal Town	254
replay	Kendal Town	1–2	AFC Fylde	170
6	Ramsbottom United	7–2	Worksop Town	355
7	Witton Albion	2–2	FC United of Manchester	693
void	FC United of Manchester	A – A	Witton Albion	650
Abandoned after 75 mins due to rain. Score 2–2.
replay	FC United of Manchester	1–2	Witton Albion	369
8	Ashton United	0–3	Sheffield	104
9	Mossley	3–2	Lancaster City	186
10	Northwich Victoria	2–0	Radcliffe Borough	123
11	Blyth Spartans	6–0	Skelmersdale United	340
12	Droylsden	0–3	Nantwich Town	114
13	Stocksbridge Park Steels	3–4	Scarborough Athletic	239
14	Marine	1–1	Burscough	238
replay	Burscough	0–1	Marine	205
15	Buxton	1–1	Darlington 1883	443
replay	Darlington 1883	3–3†	Buxton	766
Buxton advance 4–3 on penalty kicks.
16	Kettering Town	0–1	St. Ives Town	609
17	Evesham United	0–2	Leek Town	167
18	Coalville Town	3–2	Stafford Rangers	182
19	Halesowen Town	1–3	St Neots Town	273
void	Redditch United	A – A	Chasetown	189
Abandoned after 81 mins due to rain. Redditch led 2–1.
20	Redditch United	2–0	Chasetown	172
21	Gresley	2–1	Ilkeston	372
22	King's Lynn Town	1–2	Cambridge City	605
23	Belper Town	2–3	Mickleover Sports	225
24	Barwell	0–4	Rushall Olympic	153
25	Matlock Town	W/O	Hinckley United	N/A
Walkover for Matlock Town – Hinckley United removed.
26	Stourbridge	3–2	Banbury United	321
27	Grantham Town	2–2	Soham Town Rangers	217
replay	Soham Town Rangers	4–1†	Grantham Town	125
28	Daventry Town	2–1	Corby Town	150
29	Stamford	1–2	Kidsgrove Athletic	151
30	Eastbourne Town	0–0	East Thurrock United	110
replay	East Thurrock United	6–2	Eastbourne Town	130
31	Witham Town	0–3	St Albans City	85
32	Whitstable Town	2–2	Potters Bar Town	172
replay	Potters Bar Town	1–2	Whitstable Town	94
33	Lewes	1–2	Leatherhead	417
34	Arlesey Town	3–0	Waltham Abbey	94
35	Cheshunt	3–4	Three Bridges	101
36	Thamesmead Town	1–2	Metropolitan Police	

Tie no	Home team	Score	Away team	Attendance
37	AFC Sudbury	5–0	Crawley Down Gatwick	181
38	Wingate & Finchley	2–2	Hitchin Town	81
replay	Hitchin Town	0–1	Wingate & Finchley	114
39	Hastings United	4–2	Horsham	310
40	Hampton & Richmond Borough	1–1	Bedford Town	209
replay	Bedford Town	0–2	Hampton & Richmond Borough	162
41	Folkestone Invicta	2–0	Kingstonian	230
42	Leiston	0–3	Wealdstone	184
43	North Greenford United	2–1	Aylesbury	57
44	Dunstable Town	3–2	Peacehaven & Telscombe	56
45	Cray Wanderers	1–4	Hendon	81
46	Chatham Town	2–0	AFC Hayes	109
47	Wroxham	4–9	Margate	124
48	Biggleswade Town	0–1	Chesham United	168
49	Grays Athletic	1–1	Herne Bay	154
replay	Herne Bay	1–2†	Grays Athletic	170
50	Guernsey	1–2	Billericay Town	1,090
51	Bury Town	2–0	Dereham Town	217
52	Heybridge Swifts	1–2	Canvey Island	174
53	Burnham Ramblers	0–1	Carshalton Athletic	92
54	Hythe Town	3–1	Tilbury	107
55	Hemel Hempstead Town	3–2	AFC Hornchurch	511
56	Maldon & Tiptree	1–3	Maidstone United	56
57	Dulwich Hamlet	2–1	Harrow Borough	404
58	Bognor Regis Town	2–1	Thurrock	341
59	Enfield Town	2–1	Lowestoft Town	240
60	Aylesbury United	0–1	Ramsgate	210
61	Slough Town	1–2	Merthyr Town	216
62	Weymouth	1–0	Bridgwater Town	428
63	AFC Totton	1–2	Clevedon Town	186
64	Tiverton Town	3–2	Truro City	312
65	Chippenham Town	3–0	Chertsey Town	224
66	Egham Town	3–2	Cirencester Town	48
67	Shortwood United	0–2	Mangotsfield United	145
68	Hungerford Town	4–2	Bashley	112
69	Swindon Supermarine	2–3	Bideford	143
70	Frome Town	1–1	Poole Town	224
replay	Poole Town	3–1†	Frome Town	245
71	Marlow	4–1	North Leigh	109
72	Burnham	2–1	Paulton Rovers	92

† – After extra time

== Second round qualifying ==
Ties will be played on 2 November 2013

Tie no	Home team	Score	Away team	Attendance
1	Witton Albion	1–2	Leek Town	290
2	Mickleover Sports	1–2	Stourbridge	186
3	Rushall Olympic	0–1	AFC Fylde	121
4	Blyth Spartans	0–1	Ramsbottom United	298
5	Coalville Town	5–0	Marine	178
6	Scarborough Athletic	0–0	Cambridge City	442
replay	Cambridge City	1–2	Scarborough Athletic	227
7	Redditch United	5–0	Brigg Town	193
8	Kidsgrove Athletic	0–4	Curzon Ashton	146
9	Northwich Victoria	2–0	Mossley	138
10	Matlock Town	2–0	St Neots Town	244
11	Gresley	2–0	Trafford	304
12	Sheffield	1–0	Buxton	252
13	St. Ives Town	1–4	Nantwich Town	282
14	Soham Town Rangers	1–2	Chorley	193
15	Carshalton Athletic	2–1	Egham Town	119
16	Chesham United	2–1	Weymouth	276
17	Folkestone Invicta	1–1	Hungerford Town	242
replay	Hungerford Town	1–1†	Folkestone Invicta	100
Hungerford Town advance 5–4 on penalty kicks.
18	St Albans City	3–3	Billericay Town	313
replay	Billericay Town	2–2†	St Albans City	201
St Albans City advance 4–2 on penalty kicks.

Tie no	Home team	Score	Away team	Attendance
19	Arlesey Town	3–2	Poole Town	114
20	Ramsgate	4–1	Three Bridges	144
21	Enfield Town	0–1	Grays Athletic	260
22	Hastings United	0–1	AFC Sudbury	375
23	Wingate & Finchley	1–1	Daventry Town	91
replay	Daventry Town	3–1	Wingate & Finchley	124
24	Wealdstone	2–2	Maidstone United	524
replay	Maidstone United	1–0	Wealdstone	944
25	Merthyr Town	3–2	Dunstable Town	236
26	Hampton & Richmond Borough	2–1	Metropolitan Police	227
27	Marlow	2–0	Burnham	201
28	Dulwich Hamlet	3–0	Leatherhead	296
29	Margate	4–1	Clevedon Town	227
30	Bury Town	2–1	Chatham Town	238
31	Hemel Hempstead Town	9–1	North Greenford United	350
32	Bognor Regis Town	4–1	Chippenham Town	367
33	Hendon	1–0	Bideford	154
34	Canvey Island	0–2	East Thurrock United	266
35	Tiverton Town	3–1	Mangotsfield United	237
36	Hythe Town	2–2	Whitstable Town	303
replay	Whitstable Town	2–1	Hythe Town	171

† – After extra time

== Third round qualifying ==
Ties will be played on 16 November 2013. This round is the first in which Conference North and South teams join the competition.

Tie no	Home team	Score	Away team	Attendance
1	Barrow	2–2	Stockport County	727
replay	Stockport County	2–3	Barrow	812
2	Harrogate Town	1–1	Bradford Park Avenue	572
replay	Bradford Park Avenue	4–0	Harrogate Town	189
3	Chorley	2–0	Matlock Town	772
4	Leamington	2–0	Gainsborough Trinity	373
5	Sheffield	2–4	Gresley	284
6	Stalybridge Celtic	3–0	Vauxhall Motors	315
7	Solihull Moors	1–2	Coalville Town	388
8	Stourbridge	2–2	North Ferriby United	437
replay	North Ferriby United	4–0	Stourbridge	134
9	Worcester City	3–0	Ramsbottom United	341
10	AFC Telford United	6–0	Scarborough Athletic	869
11	Brackley Town	0–0	Leek Town	187
replay	Leek Town	2–1†	Brackley Town	
12	Hednesford Town	3–0	Workington	551
13	Curzon Ashton	2–1	AFC Fylde	217
14	Northwich Victoria	2–0	Nantwich Town	146
15	Guiseley	3–0	Histon	404
16	Boston United	4–1	Redditch United	784
void	Colwyn Bay	A – A	Altrincham	N/A
Match abandoned on 83 mins due to injured referee. Altrincham winning 2–0.
17	Colwyn Bay	0–2	Altrincham	280
18	Basingstoke Town	3–1	Hampton & Richmond Borough	403
19	Chelmsford City	1–2	St Albans City	429
20	Daventry Town	3–2	Ramsgate	250

Tie no	Home team	Score	Away team	Attendance
21	Sutton United	1–2	Havant & Waterlooville	374
22	Carshalton Athletic	1–2	Whitstable Town	228
23	Hayes & Yeading United	2–1	Bognor Regis Town	250
24	Tonbridge Angels	1–1	AFC Sudbury	408
replay	AFC Sudbury	0–1	Tonbridge Angels	191
25	East Thurrock United	4–2	Merthyr Town	163
26	Boreham Wood	0–1	Gloucester City	133
27	Dover Athletic	1–0	Bath City	483
28	Hungerford Town	5–0	Hemel Hempstead Town	137
29	Ebbsfleet United	4–1	Bromley	956
30	Hendon	2–1	Oxford City	197
31	Staines Town	2–2	Farnborough	299
replay	Farnborough	0–2	Staines Town	230
32	Arlesey Town	2–0	Marlow	149
33	Bury Town	5–1	Grays Athletic	305
34	Weston Super Mare	1–1	Tiverton Town	385
replay	Tiverton Town	1–2	Weston Super Mare	245
35	Whitehawk	2–1	Bishop's Stortford	107
36	Dulwich Hamlet	1–1	Concord Rangers	462
replay	Concord Rangers	4–3†	Dulwich Hamlet	156
37	Maidstone United	1–2	Eastleigh	1,397
38	Eastbourne Borough	0–1	Maidenhead United	384
39	Margate	0–3	Chesham United	317
40	Gosport Borough	3–0	Dorchester Town	206

† – After extra time

== First round ==
Ties will be played on 30 November 2013. This round is the first in which Conference Premier teams join those from lower reaches of the National League System.

Tie no	Home team	Score	Away team	Attendance
1	Leamington	0–0	Northwich Victoria	357
replay	Northwich Victoria	0–1	Leamington	131
2	Tamworth	2–0	Macclesfield Town	667
3	FC Halifax Town	0–1	Guiseley	935
4	Southport	1–2	Boston United	496
5	Coalville Town	1–1	Grimsby Town	844
replay	Grimsby Town	3–0	Coalville Town	1,102
6	Hyde	1–2	North Ferriby United	256
7	Alfreton Town	0–1	Nuneaton Town	343
8	Chorley	2–1	Curzon Ashton	595
9	Bradford Park Avenue	2–1	Kidderminster Harriers	365
10	Worcester City	0–0	AFC Telford United	764
replay	AFC Telford United	0–3	Worcester City	603
11	Altrincham	1–2	Leek Town	636
12	Wrexham	2–1	Gresley	1,257
13	Chester	1–2	Barrow	1,409
14	Gateshead	4–1	Hednesford Town	418
15	Lincoln City	5–1	Stalybridge Celtic	1,023
16	Hereford United	0–3	Woking	1,041
17	Bury Town	0–3	Eastleigh	321
18	Dartford	1–1	Forest Green Rovers	511
replay	Forest Green Rovers	1–0	Dartford	459

Tie no	Home team	Score	Away team	Attendance
19	Salisbury City	0–1	Cambridge United	727
20	Hendon	1–2	Whitstable Town	211
21	Arlesey Town	1–5	Whitehawk	181
22	Tonbridge Angels	0–0	St Albans City	484
replay	St Albans City	4–0	Tonbridge Angels	303
23	Gosport Borough	1–0	Concord Rangers	196
24	Aldershot Town	1–1	Weston Super Mare	1,084
replay	Weston Super Mare	2–5	Aldershot Town	283
25	Hungerford Town	2–0	Chesham United	211
26	Hayes & Yeading United	0–1	Barnet	302
27	Daventry Town	0–1	Maidenhead United	203
28	Staines Town	0–0	Luton Town	621
replay	Luton Town	2–0	Staines Town	911
29	Ebbsfleet United	3–0	Gloucester City	740
30	Braintree Town	3–0	Welling United	365
31	East Thurrock United	1–1	Dover Athletic	273
replay	Dover Athletic	3–1	East Thurrock United	295
32	Basingstoke Town	0–0	Havant & Waterlooville	354
replay	Havant & Waterlooville	1–0	Basingstoke Town	201

† – After extra time

== Second round ==
Ties will be played on 14 December 2013.

Tie no	Home team	Score	Away team	Attendance
1	Luton Town	2–0	Wrexham	1,617
2	Whitehawk	1–1	Havant & Waterlooville	150
replay	Havant & Waterlooville	3–1	Whitehawk	158
3	Eastleigh	2–0	Gateshead	330
4	Barnet	1–2	Grimsby Town	972
5	Barrow	0–2	Maidenhead United	560
6	Gosport Borough	0–0	Nuneaton Town	284
replay	Nuneaton Town	0–0 (2–4 p)	Gosport Borough	426
7	St Albans City	1–2	Cambridge United	887
8	Guiseley	3–0	Bradford Park Avenue	476

Tie no	Home team	Score	Away team	Attendance
9	Aldershot Town	4–1	Worcester City	1,158
10	Tamworth	2–0	Boston United	688
11	North Ferriby United	4–0	Woking	201
12	Whitstable Town	1–2	Ebbsfleet United	742
13	Leek Town	0–1	Hungerford Town	426
14	Dover Athletic	2–0	Leamington	435
15	Braintree Town	1–3	Lincoln City	410
16	Chorley	0–0	Forest Green Rovers	790
replay	Forest Green Rovers	0–0 (1–3 p)	Chorley	508

† – After extra time

== Third round ==
Ties will be played on 11 January 2014.

Tie no	Home team	Score	Away team	Attendance
1	Cambridge United	2–2	Luton Town	3,194
replay	Luton Town	0–1	Cambridge United	2,312
2	Aldershot Town	3–0	Guiseley	1,632
3	Hungerford Town	0–1	Gosport Borough	384
4	Eastleigh	3–2	Dover Athletic	368
5	Tamworth	1–1	Chorley	1,209
replay	Chorley	2–2†	Tamworth	1,393
Tamworth advance 6–5 on penalty kicks.
6	Lincoln City	0–4	North Ferriby United	2,037
7	Grimsby Town	2–1	Maidenhead United	1,623
8	Havant & Waterlooville	1–0	Ebbsfleet United	709

† – After extra time

== Fourth round ==
Ties will be played on 1 February 2014.

Tie no	Home team	Score	Away team	Attendance
1	Havant & Waterlooville	4–1	Aldershot Town	1,125
2	Eastleigh	0–1	Cambridge United	757
3	North Ferriby United	1–2	Gosport Borough	398
4	Grimsby Town	4–1	Tamworth	2,795

† – After extra time

== Semi-finals ==
=== First leg ===
17 February 2014
19:45

Havant & Waterlooville (6)	1–1	Gosport Borough (6)
Ciardini 59'		Sills 47'

West Leigh Park, Havant
Attendance: 1,314
Referee: Lee Collins

15 February 2014
15:00

Cambridge United (5)	2–1	Grimsby Town (5)
Bird 20', 53'		John-Lewis 90+4'

Abbey Stadium, Cambridge
Attendance: 3,264
Referee: Darren Bond

=== Second leg ===
22 February 2014
15:00

Gosport Borough (6)	2–0	Havant & Waterlooville (6)
Sills 45', 60'

Privett Park, Gosport
Attendance: 2,901
Referee: Tim Robinson

22 February 2014
15:00

Grimsby Town (5)	1–1	Cambridge United (5)
Neilson 42'		Bird 8'

Blundell Park, Cleethorpes
Attendance: 3,931
Referee: Tony Harrington

== Final ==
23 March 2014
15:00

Gosport Borough (6)	0–4	Cambridge United (5)
	Report	Bird 39'; Donaldson 50', 60'; Berry 77' (pen.)

Wembley Stadium, London
Attendance: 18,120
Referee: Craig Pawson
