= Snowdown Colliery Welfare F.C. =

English football club

Snowdown Colliery Welfare F.C. (Snowdown CW) was an association football club based in Snowdown, Kent. The club existed at different times as a Junior, Intermediate and Senior status club; at the latter level the club competed in the original Kent League, Aetolian League, Greater London League, Thames and Medway Combination and the second Kent League. The club entered the FA Cup between 1949 and 1979 (with absence periods in the mid 1960s and 1970s) reaching the third qualifying round on one occasion.

== History ==
=== 1913 – 1940 ===
The first club attached to the colliery was founded in 1913 as Snowdown Colliery shortly after commercial mining began at the pit. The club played in the Dover and District Junior League for the 1913–14 season, playing home matches on the newly opened recreation ground adjoining the mine, winning only one match and conceding in excess of one hundred goals in the ten team league. In 1926, with the revival of the colliery under new owners, the Snowdown Colliery club once again entered the Dover and District League. The following season, 1927–28, the club were Dover and District league champions and Dover Hospital Cup (Div II) winners; at the end of the season the club disbanded.

In the summer of 1930, following an unsuccessful application to rejoin the Dover based league, the Snowdown Colliery Welfare club joined the Deal and District Junior League. They played home matches on the recently opened Spinney Road recreation ground (funded by the Colliery Welfare Fund and contributions from the Snowdown colliery employees) at the expanding coal miner's village of Aylesham. Snowdown CW were Deal and District league champions for two successive seasons and Deal Charity and then Deal Nursing cup winners. The club changed league for the 1932–33 season and played in Division One of the Eastern section of the Kent Amateur League, recording a ninth from thirteen teams finishing position in their single season in the league.

The 1934–35 season saw a return of a club associated with the Snowdown colliery to the Deal and District Junior League with the Snowdown Club and Institute team competing. That season they won the league championship and two cups and repeated winning the league championship the following season (with the reserves team finishing first and then as runners-up in the Second Division). In 1937, after a one season gap, the Snowdown Colliery Welfare club returned to the Deal League for a single season, finishing in the bottom position of the table. Snowdown CW began the 1939–40 season playing in the Canterbury and District League however, following the outbreak of the Second World War and the formation of the wartime Kent Amateur League the club played in that league's Eastern Division Two.

=== 1944 – 2004 ===
The Snowdown Colliery Welfare club was reformed in 1943 and the following season entered the Kent League, in which they would compete for the next fifteen seasons. In their first season the club won their first Senior status trophy, the Kent League Cup, defeating Shorts Sports 4–1 in the final in April 1945. Four seasons later the club advanced to the semi-finals of the Kent League Cup where they were defeated 4–3 after extra time by Gillingham Reserves.

Following several seasons of finishing towards the bottom of the Kent League table, in August 1949 the club appointed former Charlton Athletic and Plymouth Argyle centre-half John (known as Jack) Oakes as manager. During his almost four season tenure the team he built recorded several notable achievements: in 1949–50, Oakes' first season in charge, Snowdown CW reached the Kent League Cup Final, being defeated 1–0 by Canterbury City; the following season the team established a club record of 26 games without defeat, won both the Kent Senior Cup (defeating Bromley 2–1 after extra time in a replay), the Kent League Cup (defeating Folkestone Town 2–1 in a replay), recorded a second placed finish in the League and reached third qualifying round of the FA cup (defeated in a replay 3–6 by Southern League club Tonbridge) – the latter being an all time club best; the 1951–52 season saw the club repeat their second-placed finish in the league.

Oakes left the club in February 1953 and shortly afterwards was replaced by former Coventry City player Harry Barratt who had been managing Rugby Town. Under him the club were, for the sole occasion in their history, Kent League champions in the 1954–55 season and reached the Kent League Cup semi-finals. Barratt left the club in December 1955, returning to Coventry City as Head Coach. In April 1956 the team again won the Kent Senior Cup defeating Southern League club Dartford 2–0 in a final tie replay and finished third in the 1955–56 Kent League table. Former Luton Town and Gillingham player Bill Burtenshaw who had been with Snowdown CW for four seasons was appointed player/manager in May 1956. In his first season in charge the club repeated the third-placed league position; this marked the end of the club's period at the forefront of Kentish football as they finished in mid-table positions in the next two seasons.

The Kent League disbanded in the spring of 1959 and along with many ex-Kent League clubs who had not moved up to the Southern League Snowdown CW were founder members of the newly instigated Aetolian League for the 1959–60 season and additionally played the first of four successive seasons in the Thames and Medway Combination league as a subsidiary competition. In 1960–61 they were Aetolian League champions and the next campaign were league runners-up and Aetolian League Cup winners, defeating Chatham in the final 4–3 after extra time. In the 1963–64 season Snowdown CW were beaten 3–2 by Chatham Town in the final of the Aetolian/London Joint Cup. The next season the club played in the Greater London League (an amalgamation of the Aetolian and London leagues), finishing third in the table. In February 1965 the cub announced they would no longer engage professional players and would assume amateur status. After initially being included in the listings for the Greater London League for the 1965–66 season the club were subsequently refused membership and consequently the club's first team replaced their reserves team in the six team Thames and Medway Combination league.

For the following 1966–67 season, with Snowdown CW continuing as members, the Thames and Medway Combination league expanded (taking in reserve sides of Kent based Southern League clubs) and was renamed the Kent Premier League; Snowdown CW were inaugural League Cup runners-up, beaten 2–4 over two legs in the final by Margate Reserves. Two seasons later the league was renamed the Kent Football League; Snowdown CW were members of this grouping until 1988–89, except for the 1971–72 season in which for financial reasons they played in the Premier Division of the Eastern Section of the Kent County Amateur League. Seven seasons after their return to the Kent League in 1979 after finishing bottom of Division One the club took a voluntary demotion to Division Two, becoming the sole non-reserves team in the division – finishing in bottom position in their first two seasons in the division. In 1987 the Snowdown colliery closed however the eponymously named team played-on. After the 1988–89 season, owing to the club's long spell of ten seasons in Division 2 and latterly operating without a reserves team, the Kent FA ruled the club to be of Intermediate status and consequently as Senior status was a requirement for clubs to be members of the Kent League its committee cancelled the club's league membership. During their total of 22 seasons in the Kent Premier/Kent League the club recorded some mid, but mostly lower season end positions in the league tables – twice achieving a high-point of fifth and a further five occasions in the top half of the table.

Snowdown CW joined the Eastern Section of the Kent County League for the 1989–90 season and continued to be members of this grouping until 2004. During their first two seasons the club were members of the Senior Division, then after a bottom placed finish in the Division in 1990–91 they played in the Premier Division the following season. After consolidation of the top divisions of the Western and Eastern sections of the Kent County League in 1992 Snowdown CW were placed into the highest ranked Eastern Section league, Division One. After a couple of seasons finishing towards the foot of the table the club recorded mostly upper/mid table finishes with a best runners-up position in the 1995–96 season. In 1998 they were beaten finalists 1–3 by Rye United in the Weald of Kent Charity Cup and the following season were beaten semi-finalists in the Les Leckie (formerly Kent County League) Cup. Snowdown CW left the league in September 2004 having been defeated in their first three matches of the 2004–05 campaign, conceding 27 goals without reply.

=== Club Miscellany ===
The club were nicknamed 'The Miners' or 'The Colliers'. They initially played home matches on a ground adjoining the Snowdown colliery before, in 1930, moving to the Spinney Lane recreation ground at Aylesham – a facility managed by the miners' welfare organisation. The team wore black and white shirts in tribute to Newcastle United as many families had moved in the 1920s from the north east of England to find employment in the expanding east Kent coal industry. The team included some Geordie players and in their heyday in the 1950s the team played their football in the characteristic tough Geordie style (identified in the local press as 'robust, tooth-and-nail methods'). In addition to their league commitments whilst the colliery was owned by Pearson and Dorman Long Limited (1924–1947) the club competed for (and were occasional winners of) the Colonel Byrne Cup, a Kent inter-colliery competition named for the Managing Director of the owners. Several years after the club left the Kent County League a Snowdown Colliery Welfare club played in the Canterbury and District League.

== Honours ==
- Kent League
  - Champions: 1954–55.
  - Runners–up: 1950–51; 1951–52.
- Kent League Cup
  - Winners: 1944–45; 1950–51.
  - Runners–up: 1949–50; 1966–67 (Kent Premier League Cup).
- Kent Senior Cup
  - Winners: 1950–51; 1955–56.
- Aetolian League
  - Champions: 1960–61.
  - Runners–up: 1961–62.
- Aetolian League Cup
  - Winners: 1961–62.
- Aetolian / London Joint Cup
  - Runners–up: 1963–64.
- Kent County League: Eastern Section
  - Division 1: Runners–up: 1995–96.
- Weald of Kent Charity Cup
  - Runners–up: 1997–98.
- Dover and District Junior League
  - Champions: 1927–28 (Snowdown Colliery).
- Dover Hospitals Cup
  - Winners: 1927–28 (Snowdown Colliery).
- Deal and District Junior League
  - Champions: 1930–31; 1931–32; 1934–35 (Snowdown Club & Institute); 1935–36 (Snowdown Club & Institute).
- Deal and District Junior League Cup
  - Winners: 1934–35 (Snowdown Club & Institute)
- Deal Charity Cup
  - Winners: 1930–31
- Deal Nursing Cup
  - Champions: 1931–32; 1934–35 (Snowdown Club & Institute).

== Season playing records ==
Season	Lge	Pld	W	D	L	GF	GA	Pts	Pos	FA Cup	Other*
Snowdown Colliery
1913–14	Dover & District Jnr Lge	17	1	2	14	12	103	4	9/10		
1926–27	Dover & District Jnr Lge	14	6	3	5	44	29	15	5/9		2 not plyd
1927–28	Dover & District Jnr Lge	15	13	1	1	70	19	27	1/9		w:DHC
Key: DHC=Dover Hospital Cup
Snowdown Colliery Welfare
1930–31	Deal & District Jnr Lge	18	15	0	3	72	26	30	1/10		w:DCC
1931–32	Deal & District Jnr Lge	20	14	3	3	77	29	31	1/10		w:DNC
1932–33	Kent Amateur Lge E 1	22	8	3	11	37	70	19	9/13		
Key: DCC=Deal Charity Cup; DNC=Deal & District Nursing Cup
Snowdown Club & Institute
1934–35	Deal & Dist. Jnr Lge D1	22	17	4	1	93	31	38	1/12		w:DLC; w:DNC
1935–36	Deal & Dist. Jnr Lge D1	22	19	1	2	99	30	39	1/12		
Key: DLC=Deal & District League Cup; DNC=Deal & District Nursing Cup
Snowdown Colliery Welfare
1937–38	Deal & Dist. Jnr Lge D1	14	3	1	10	19	38	7	8/8		
1939–40	Kent Amateur Lge: Eastern II										
1944–45	Kent League	18	7	3	8	59	53	17	5/10		w:KLC
1945–46	Kent League	20	5	1	14	45	80	11	10/11		
1946–47	Kent League Div 1	30	9	7	14	56	99	25	12/16		
1947–48	Kent League Div 1	34	8	8	18	61	89	24	15/18		
1948–49	Kent League Div 1	34	13	5	16	92	96	31	12/18		sf:KLC
1949–50	Kent League Div 1	32	18	4	10	79	50	40	5/17	1Q	ru:KLC
1950–51	Kent League Div 1	32	21	7	4	88	33	49	2/17	3Q	w:KSC; w:KLC
1951–52	Kent League Div 1	32	16	9	7	68	36	41	2/17	2Q	
1952–53	Kent League Div 1	32	14	6	12	74	53	34	10/17	P	
1953–54	Kent League Div 1	30	15	8	7	54	39	38	4/16	P	
1954–55	Kent League Div 1	32	18	9	5	60	36	45	1/17	2Q	sf:KLC
1955–56	Kent League Div 1	32	20	4	8	91	50	44	3/17	1Q	w:KSC
1956–57	Kent League Div 1	32	21	4	7	84	42	46	3/17	1Q	
1957–58	Kent League Div 1	34	17	4	13	76	69	38	8/18	P	
1958–59	Kent League Div 1	34	13	8	13	81	76	34	10/18	1Q	sf:KSC
1959–60	Aetolian League Div 1	26	8	10	8	47	47	26	7/14	1Q	
1960–61	Aetolian League Div 1	24	18	2	4	81	40	38	1/13	2Q	
1961–62	Aetolian League Div 1	26	14	6	6	71	51	34	2/14		w:ALC
1962–63	Aetolian League Div 1	24	9	6	9	38	34	24	8/13		
1963–64	Aetolian League Div 1	21	9	1	11	43	37	19	6/12		ru:ALJC; sf:ALC
1964–65	Greater London Lge - B	22	15	3	4	52	22	33	3/12		
1965–66	Thames & Medway Comb.										
1966–67	Kent Premier League	26	15	3	8	60	36	33	5/14		ru:KPLC
1967–68	Kent Premier League	34	8	3	23	44	90	19	16/18	1Q	
1968–69	Kent League	34	9	8	17	54	60	26	15/18	2Q	
1969–70	Kent League	28	11	5	12	54	52	27	8/15	1Q	
1970–71	Kent League	38	18	4	16	77	63	40	7/20	P	
1971–72	Kent Amateur Lge E Prem										
1972–73	Kent League	38	11	7	20	44	71	29	16/20		
1973–74	Kent League	36	8	8	20	45	88	24	18/19		sf:KLC
1974–75	Kent League	36	7	12	17	46	83	26	15/19		
1975–76	Kent League	36	17	5	14	64	53	39	9/19		
1976–77	Kent League	32	5	13	14	29	52	23	13/17		
1977–78	Kent League	34	8	6	20	44	76	22	14/18	2Q	
1978–79	Kent League Div 1	34	4	7	23	29	102	15	18/18	1Q	
1979–80	Kent League Div 2	30	3	3	24	28	122	9	16/16	P	
1980–81	Kent League Div 2	36	6	3	27	38	112	15	19/19		
1981–82	Kent League Div 2	32	8	5	19	41	92	21	15/17		
1982–83	Kent League Div 2	34	4	10	20	42	89	18	17/18		
1983–84	Kent League Div 2	28	9	7	12	35	44	34	11/15		
1984–85	Kent League Div 2	32	12	7	13	44	47	43	8/17		sf:KL2C
1985–86	Kent League Div 2	34	15	5	14	51	45	50	7/18		
1986–87	Kent League Div 2	34	17	5	12	55	51	56	5/18		
1987–88	Kent League Div 2	34	16	9	9	59	47	57	7/18		
1988–89	Kent League Div 2	36	14	9	13	61	60	44	12/19		7 pts deducted
1989–90	Kent County Lge E Snr	22	12	1	9	44	36	37	4/12		
1990–91	Kent County Lge E Snr	17	2	1	14	16	60	7	12/12		5 not plyd
1991–92	Kent County Lge E Prem	22	12	4	6	62	43	40	4/12		
1992–93	Kent County Lge E 1	24	7	4	13	43	66	25	11/13		
1993–94	Kent County Lge E 1	25	7	3	15	30	54	24	11/14		
1994–95	Kent County Lge E 1	28	14	2	12	63	56	44	7/15		
1995–96	Kent County Lge E 1	24	14	6	4	60	38	48	2/13		
1996–97	Kent County Lge E 1	24	7	5	12	46	65	26	8/13		
1997–98	Kent County Lge E 1	22	7	3	12	35	39	24	8/12		ru:WKC
1998–99	Kent County Lge E 1	26	9	4	13	49	70	31	9/14		sf:LLC
1999–2000	Kent County Lge E 1	24	13	3	8	57	42	42	4/13		
2000–01	Kent County Lge E 1	18	5	2	11	31	49	17	7/10		
2001–02	Kent County Lge E 1	18	10	2	6	49	37	32	3/10		
2002–03	Kent County Lge E 1	24	8	4	12	45	50	28	8/9		
2003–04	Kent County Lge E 1	24	11	3	10	39	63	36	4/9		
Key: KLC=Kent League Cup; KSC=Kent Senior Cup; ALC=Atolian League Cup; ALJC=Aetolian/London Joint Cup; KPLC=Kent Premier League Cup; KL2C=Kent League Division 2 Cup; WKC=Weald of Kent Charity Cup; LLC=Les Leckie Cup

League Record

- Pld = Played
- W = Games won
- D = Games drawn
- L = Games lost
- GF = Goals for
- GA = Goals against
- Pts = Points
- Pos = Final position/rank

FA Cup

- P = Preliminary round
- 1Q = First qualifying round
- 2Q = Second qualifying round
- 3Q = Third qualifying round

'* Other'

- w = winner
- ru = runner-up
- sf = semi-finalist

See also each section for key to 'other'
