= Peter Smith (English footballer, born 1969) =

English footballer

Personal information
- Full name: Peter John Smith
- Date of birth: 12 July 1969 (age 57)
- Place of birth: Cannock, England
- Height: 6 ft 0 in (1.83 m)
- Position: Right back

Senior career*
Years	Team	Apps	(Gls)
- Lichfield City
- Tamworth
- Alvechurch
- Bromsgrove Rovers
- Willenhall
- Banbury United
19??–1994	Alma Swanley		
1994–1999	Brighton & Hove Albion	140	(5)
1999–2000	Woking		
2000–2002	Canvey Island		
2002–2003	Grays Athletic		
2003–2005	Canvey Island		
2005–2006	Chelmsford City		
2006–20??	Staines Town		
- * Club domestic league appearances and goals

Peter John Smith (born 12 July 1969) is an English former professional footballer who made 140 Football League appearances playing as a right back for Brighton & Hove Albion.

== Life and career ==
Smith was born in Cannock, Staffordshire. He played non-league football for a string of clubs in that area, worked in the building trade and in social work, and was studying at the University of Greenwich when Brighton & Hove Albion offered him professional terms in 1994. He stayed with the club for five years and made 140 league appearances before spending several years back in non-league in the London area.

In 2007, Smith and Jamie Moralee co-founded a player agency where, as of 2018, both were still involved.
