= Sheerness Times Guardian =

Newspaper

- Type: Weekly newspaper
- Format: Tabloid
- Owner(s): KM Group
- Editor: Matt Ramsden
- Founded: 1858
- Language: English
- Headquarters: Sheerness
- Circulation: 1,881 (as of 2022)

The Sheerness Times Guardian is a weekly newspaper serving the Isle of Sheppey, Kent. It is owned by the KM Group and is published on Wednesdays.

== History ==
The Sheerness Times Guardian, in its current form, was formed in September 1939 by the merger of the Sheerness Guardian and the Sheerness Times. The former paper had launched in 1858, the latter in 1868r.

It was bought by the KM Group in 1987.

Along with the rest of the KM-owned papers, the Times Guardian was given a design overhaul in May 2005.

The paper launched a special ale in 2008 to celebrate its 150th birthday. Named "STG150", it was launched by 3 local soldiers, with profits going to local charities in the Sheppey area. During the course of the year, the paper also featured a special anniversary logo designed by local schoolchildren.
