= Alma Swanley F.C. =

Alma Swanley
- Full name: Alma Swanley Football Club
- Nickname: The Alma
- Founded: Early 1960s
- Dissolved: 1994
- Ground: Green Court Sports Club, Green Court Road, Crockenhill from 1982 having previously located at Swanley Recreation Ground.
- Final season 1993–94: 5th in Kent League Division One

Alma Swanley F.C was an English football club based in Swanley. They were originally known as Alma after the pub in Birchwood (lastly known as The Birchwood before being demolished in 2011) near the Bull Hotel. They originally played in the Dartford and District league, with ex Swanley Comprehensive School boys. They had to include "Swanley" within their name for senior status. They were founding members of the London Spartan League in 1975 and joined the Kent League in 1982. They won the title in 1986 but resigned from the league in 1994 and folded.

The club competed in the FA Cup six times, with the best performance coming in their final season in the competition, 1992–93, when they lost in the second qualifying round to Yeading. In the FA Vase, their longest run was to the Quarter Finals in 1980–81. They played Windsor & Eton and after a 2–2 draw AET at home on Swanley Rec, with goals from Colin Ball and player manager Johnny Kane in front of a record 1,100 crowd they were defeated 4–1 in the replay.

Alma ended their final season 1993–94 as winners of the Kent Senior Trophy. They defeated Folkestone Invicta 3–1 in the final. One of their goalscorers was Peter Smith who afterwards played first team professional football for Brighton & Hove Albion. He had played in a memorial match for the club's manager who had died at the end of the season played at Greenwich Borough and a scout spotted him.

The club colours were red and black.

== League history ==
League history is not complete

Season	Division	Position	Significant events
Joined newly formed London Spartan League Division One
1975–76	London Spartan League Division One	3	–
1976–77	London Spartan League Division One	2	Promoted
1977–78	London Spartan League Premier Division	3	–
1978–79	London Spartan League Premier Division	12	–
1979–80	London Spartan League Premier Division	12	–
1980–81	London Spartan League Premier Division	9	–
1981–82	London Spartan League Premier Division	7	–
Joined Kent League Division One
1982–83	Kent League Division One	11	–
1983–84	Kent League Division One	13	–
1984–85	Kent League Division One	11	–
1985–86	Kent League Division One	1	Champions
1986–87	Kent League Division One	3	–
1987–88	Kent League Division One	12	–
1988–89	Kent League Division One	6	–
1989–90	Kent League Division One	5	–
1990–91	Kent League Division One	8	–
1991–92	Kent League Division One	5	–
1992–93	Kent League Division One	5	–
1993–94	Kent League Division One	5	–
Left Kent League

== Sources ==
- Alma Swanley at the Football Club History Database
