= Hythe Town F.C. =

Association football club in England

Coordinates: 51°04′06″N 1°04′12″E

Hythe Town
- Full name: Hythe Town Football Club
- Nickname: The Cannons
- Founded: 1910
- Ground: Reachfields Stadium, Hythe
- Capacity: 3,000 (350 seated)
- Chairman: Vishal Nanda
- Manager: Andy Crush
- League: Southern Counties East League Division One
- 2025–26: Southern Counties East League Premier Division, 19th of 19 (relegated)
Home colours	Away colours

Hythe Town Football Club is a football club based in Hythe, Kent, England. They are currently members of the Southern Counties East League Division One and play at the Reachfields Stadium.

== History ==
The original club was established in August 1910. They joined the Folkestone & District League, winning the title four times after World War I. In 1936 the club moved up to the Kent County Amateur League, joining Division Two of the Eastern Section. They won the division at the first attempt, but were not promoted. They won the division again the following season, and this time were promoted to Division One. Following World War II the club was placed in the South Division for the 1946–47 and 1947–48 seasons, before league reorganisation in 1948 saw them return to Division One of the Eastern Section.

Division One was later renamed the Premier Division and Hythe were relegated to Division One. However, after winning the Division One title in 1971–72 they went on to win three consecutive Premier Division titles between 1973–74 and 1975–76. The club were Premier Division runners-up in 1976–77, after which the club moved up to the Kent League. The club were Kent League runners-up in 1978–79, 1982–83 and 1984–85, and after winning the league title in 1988–89, they were promoted to the Southern Division of the Southern League. The following year the club reached the semi-finals of the FA Vase, losing 4–3 to Yeading. After three seasons in the Southern League, they folded in 1992.

Supporters subsequently formed a successor club, Hythe United, which joined Division One East of the Kent County League for the 1992–93 season. Despite only finishing sixth in their first season, the club was promoted to the Premier Division. After finishing ninth in the Premier Division in 1994–95, they rejoined the Kent League. In 2001 the club's name was changed to Hythe Town, and in 2008–09 they finished the season as Kent League runners-up. In 2010–11 the club were Kent League champions, earning promotion to Division One South of the Isthmian League.

The 2010–11 season saw Hythe reach the first round of the FA Cup for the first time, losing 5–1 at Hereford United. They won the Kent Senior Cup for the first time the following season, defeating Dartford 1–0 in the final. A fourth-place finish in 2012–13 secured qualification for the promotion play-offs; the club went on to lose 3–0 to Faversham Town in the semi-finals. Another fourth-place finish in 2015–16 led to another play-off campaign, in which they were beaten 7–0 by Worthing in the semi-finals. The club finished fifth in the renamed South East Division in 2022–23, going on to beat Ramsgate on penalties in the play-off semi-finals before losing 1–0 to Whitehawk in the final. The 2024–25 season saw them finish second-from-bottom of the South East Division, resulting in relegation to the Premier Division of the Southern Counties East League The club finished bottom of the Premier Division the following season, resulting in a second successive relegation to Division One.

== Ground ==
The club moved to its Reachfields ground in 1977, which had previously been an army sports ground next to a firing range. The record attendance of 2,147 was set for the FA Vase semi-final match against Yeading in 1990 The ground currently has a capacity of 3,000, of which 350 is seated and 2,400 covered.

== Honours ==
- Kent League
  - Champions 1988–89, 2010–11
  - Runners Up 1978-79, 1982-82, 1984-85, 2008-09
- Kent County League
  - Eastern Section Premier Division champions 1973–74, 1974–75, 1975–76
  - Eastern Section Division One champions 1971–72
  - Eastern Section Division Two champions 1936–37, 1937–38
  - League Cup winners 1949–50, 1953–54, 1972–73, 1974–75, 1975–76
  - Eastern Section Benevolent Cup winners 1949–50
  - Eastern Section Division Two Benevolent Cup winners 1936–37
- Kent Senior Cup
  - Winners 2011–12
  - Runners Up 1991-92
- Kent Junior Cup
  - Winners 1974-75
- Kent Senior Trophy
  - Winners 1990–91
  - Runners Up 2003-04
- Southern League Cup
  - Runners Up 1990-91
- Kent League Cup
  - Runners Up 1987-88, 2007-08, 2010-11
- Eastern Professional Floodlight Cup
  - Winners 1989–90, 1990–91
- Isthmian League Division One South Play-Offs
  - 2012-13, 2016-16, 2023-24

== Records ==
- Best FA Cup performance: First round, 2010–11
- Best FA Trophy performance: Fourth round, 2023–24
- Best FA Vase performance: Semi-finals, 1989–90
- Record attendance: 2,147 vs Yeading, FA Vase semi-final, 1990
- Biggest win: 10–1 vs Sporting Bengal United, 2008–09
- Heaviest defeat: 10–1 vs Swanley Furness, 1997–98
- Most appearances: Dave Cook
- Most goals: Dave Cook

== See also ==
- Hythe Town F.C. players
- Hythe Town F.C. managers
