= Kent Messenger =

- Type: Weekly newspaper
- Format: Tabloid
- Owner(s): KM Group
- Publisher: KM Group
- Editor: Denise Eaton
- Founded: 1859
- Language: English
- Headquarters: Maidstone
- Circulation: 8,390 (as of 2022)
- Website: kentonline.co.uk

The Kent Messenger is a weekly newspaper serving the mid-Kent area. It is published in three editions - Maidstone, Malling, and the Weald. It is owned by the KM Group and is published on Thursdays.

== History ==
The Kent Messenger grew from the Maidstone Telegraph founded in the county town of Kent in 1859. It changed to its current name two years later. It was sold to the Boorman family in 1890 after its then owners, the Masters brothers, were jailed.

In 1942 the Kent Messenger offices were used by Canterbury newspaper the Kentish Gazette (then not owned by the Kent Messenger Group) after the Gazette's offices were destroyed by a Luftwaffe raid on Canterbury, in order to produce that week's copy of the Gazette.

The Kent Messenger remains the flagship newspaper for the KM Group. Besides the main edition for Maidstone, editions are also published for Malling and the Weald. Along with the rest of the KM-owned papers, the Kent Messenger was given a design overhaul in May 2005.

The current editor is Denise Eaton.

== Offices ==
The Kent Messenger is based at the KM Group's Maidstone office. The offices also housed the paper's sister radio station KMFM Maidstone until the station moved to the Medway offices in 2008.
