= Faversham Town F.C. =

Association football club in England

Coordinates: 51°18′25″N 0°53′44″E

Faversham Town
- Full name: Faversham Town Football Club
- Nickname: The Lilywhites
- Founded: 1884
- Ground: Salters Lane, Faversham
- Capacity: 2,000 (200 seated)
- Chairman: Gary Smart
- Manager: Steve Watt
- League: Isthmian League South East Division
- 2025–26: Isthmian League South East Division, 7th of 22
Home colours	Away colours

Faversham Town Football Club is a football club based in Faversham, Kent, England. Nicknamed the 'Lilywhites' due to their white strip, they are currently members of the Isthmian League South East Division and play at Salters Lane.

== History ==
The club was established in 1884 and were founder members of the Kent League in 1894, joining Division Two of the new league. They were Division Two champions in 1895–96, earning promotion to Division One. They left the league in 1900, but returned in 1904. When the league was expanded in 1909 they were moved into Division Two East. After finishing bottom of the division in 1911–12, the club left the league for a second time. The club rejoined the league in 1924 under the name Faversham Rangers, and were placed in Division Two (Mid-Kent). However, they left the league after three seasons. Now under the name Faversham Invicta, they joined Division One of the Eastern Section of the Kent County League in 1934. Although they were relegated to the Mid-Kent Section at the end of the 1934–35 season, they returned to the Kent League in 1937, joining Division Two. They finished bottom of the division in 1938–39.

After World War II Faversham (now under their current name) continued in the Kent League, and were Division Two runners-up in 1946–47. They were promoted to Division One at the end of the 1948–49 season and remained in Division One until the league folded in 1959, at which point they joined the Aetolian League. In 1964 the Aetolian League merged with the London League to form the Greater London League, with Faversham placed in the 'B' Section. In 1965 they became members of the Premier Division. However, they left at the end of the 1965–66 season to join the reformed Kent League. They went on to win back-to-back league titles in 1969–70 and 1970–71, before joining Division One the Metropolitan–London League (a merger of the Greater London League and the Metropolitan League) in 1971.

Faversham were runners-up in their first season in the Metropolitan–London League. In 1973 they transferred to Division Two of the Athenian League, but after finishing bottom of the table in 1975–76 they returned to the Kent League. In 1977–78 they won the Kent League, a feat they repeated in 1989–90. After several seasons of struggling in the league, including finishing bottom of the table in 1995–96 and 2001–02, the club resigned from the league eight matches from the end of the 2002–03 season. They did not enter a league in 2003–04 or 2004–05, but joined the Premier Division of the Kent County League in 2005. After finishing as Premier Division runners-up in their first season, they were promoted back to the Kent League. They went on to win the Kent League in 2009–10, earning promotion to Division One South of the Isthmian League.

In 2012–13 Faversham finished third in Division One South, qualifying for the promotion play-offs. After defeating Hythe Town 3–0 in the semi-finals, they were beaten 3–0 by Maidstone United in the final. Another third-place finish in 2014–15 ended with the club losing 5–4 on penalties to Merstham in the semi-finals of the play-offs after a 0–0 draw. They reached the play-offs again in 2015–16 after finishing fifth, but after beating Dorking Wanderers 2–1 in the semi-finals, the club lost 3–0 to Worthing in the final. They were relegated back to the renamed Southern Counties East League Premier Division at the end of the 2022–23 season after finishing second-from-bottom of the South East Division of the Isthmian League. The club were runners-up in the Premier Division the following season, going on to lose on penalties to Corinthian in the play-off semi-finals. In 2024–25 they were Premier Division champions, earning promotion to the South East Division of the Isthmian League.

== Ground ==
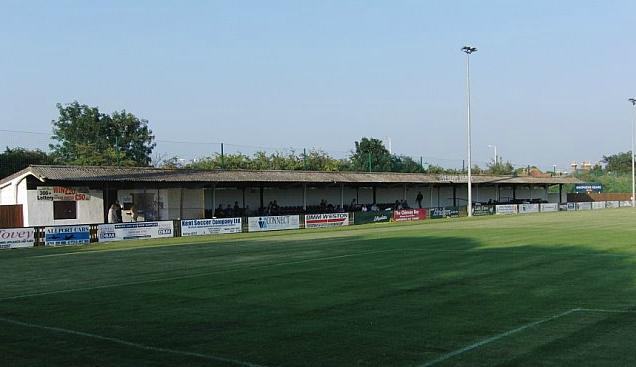
Salter's Lane

The club moved to Salters Lane in 1948. The ground currently has a capacity of 2,000, of which 200 is seated and 1,800 covered. An artificial pitch was installed in 2023.

== Crest ==
Due to the fact that Faversham's civic coat of arms is based on the Royal Arms of England, Faversham Town is the only English club side to have a badge depicting three lions passant guardant, similar to that of the England national team.

== Honours ==
- Southern Counties East League
  - Champions 1969–70, 1970–71, 1977–78, 1989–90, 2009–10, 2024–25
  - Division Two champions 1895–96
- Kent Senior Trophy
  - Winners 1976–77, 1977–78, 2009–10
- Kent Amateur Cup
  - Winners 1956–57, 1958–59, 1971–72, 1972–73, 1973–74

== Records ==
- Best FA Cup performance: Third qualifying round, 2016–17, 2025–26
- Best FA Trophy performance: First round, 2021–22, 2026–27
- Best FA Vase performance: Third round, 1991–92, 2024–25

== See also ==
- Faversham Town F.C. players
- Faversham Town F.C. managers
