= Crockenhill F.C. =

Association football club in England

Coordinates: 51.381712°N 0.1771°E

Crockenhill
- Full name: Crockenhill Football Club
- Nickname: The Crocks
- Founded: 1946
- Chairman: Steve Cullen
- Manager: Stuart Webb
- League: Sevenoaks & District League Premier Division
- 2025–26: Kent County League Division Two Central, 10th of 11 (relegated)
Home colours	Away colours

Crockenhill Football Club is a football club based in the village of Crockenhill near Swanley in Kent, England. Affiliated to the Kent County Football Association, the club are currently members of the Sevenoaks & District League Premier Division and play at Wested Meadow.

== History ==
The original Crockenhill Football Club was formed by 1907. After World War I a village club played in the Dartford League during the 1920s. The modern club was established in 1946 as the result of a friendly match on 26 December 1945 between Crockenhill Youth and Mudhole Dynamo. They joined Division One of the Western Section of the Kent County Amateur League in 1946. After winning the division in 1948–49, the club were promoted to the Premier Division. In 1952–53 they were Premier Division runners-up, and won the division the following season. In 1954 the top division was renamed the Senior Division, with the club finishing as runners-up in 1954–55 and winning the title in 1956–57.

In 1959 Crockenhill were founder members of the Aetolian League. They remained members of the league until it merged with the London League to form the Greater London League in 1964, when they were placed in Section B. A fourth-place finish in the league's first season saw them placed in the Premier Division for the 1965–66 season. However, after finishing in the bottom two in 1967–68, the club switched to the Kent League.

In 1982–83 Crockenhill won the Kent League. They were runners-up in 1986–87, but finished bottom of the league the following season. After several years of finishing near the bottom of the table (and bottom again in 1992–93), they dropped into the Premier Division of the Kent County League at the end of the 1998–99 season due to a lack of floodlights. Their first season in the league saw them finish second-bottom of the division, resulting in relegation to Division One West. However, they won Division One West at the first attempt, earning promotion back to the Premier Division. The club avoided relegation after finishing second-from-bottom of the Premier Division in 2002–03 and went on to win the league in 2003–04. However, they were not promoted back to the Kent League due to as they had not installed floodlights. After finishing eleventh the following season and second-from-bottom in 2005–06, the club finished bottom of the Premier Division in 2006–07 and 2007–08, after which they were relegated to Division One West for a second time.

Despite finishing bottom of Division One West in 2010–11, Crockenhill were founder members of the new Kent Invicta League in 2011, effectively moving up two levels. They finished bottom of the league in 2013–14, but were not relegated. In 2016 the Kent Invicta League merged with the Kent League to form the Southern Counties East League, with the Kent Invicta clubs becoming members of Division One. The 2017–18 season saw Crockenhill finish bottom of Division One, resulting in relegation to the Premier Division of the Kent County League. They finished bottom of the Premier Division in 2021–22, failing to win a league match all season, and were relegated to Division One West. The club finished bottom of Division One West the following season with a negative points total after having three points deducted and again failing to win a league game, resulting in relegation to Division Two West.

Crockenhill were transferred to Division Two Central at the end of the 2024–25 season. In 2025–26 they finished second-from-bottom of the division and were relegated to the Premier Division of the Sevenoaks & District League.

== Ground ==
The original club played at a meadow owned by club president David Langlands.

The modern club plays at Wested Meadow, which had previously been the home ground of Crockenhill United. It was used as a base for a barrage balloon during World War II, with a Nissen hut built on the site. After the war the new club leased the site from its owner, Mr Miller, and had built a new stand and dressing rooms by 1951. In the 1960s the Nissen hut was converted into a clubhouse. A small terrace was added next to the stand, with a roof and seating added later.

Wested Meadow was used as a filming location for the 2018 comedy film The Bromley Boys, as a substitute for Bromley's Hayes Lane stadium.

== Honours ==
- Kent League
  - Champions 1982–83
- Kent County League
  - Premier Division champions 2003–04
  - Senior Division (Western Section) champions 1953–54, 1956–57
  - Division One (Western Section) champions 1948–49
  - Division One West champions 2000–01
- Kent Senior Trophy
  - Winners 1980–81
- Sevenoaks Charity Cup
  - Winners 1948–49
- West Kent Challenge Shield
  - Winners 1956-57

== Records ==
- Best FA Cup performance: First qualifying round, 1987–88
- Best FA Vase performance: Fourth round, 1974–75, 1983–84

== See also ==
- Crockenhill F.C. players
