= Whitstable Town F.C. =

Association football club in England

Whitstable Town
- Full name: Whitstable Town Football Club
- Nickname: The Oystermen or The Natives
- Founded: 1885
- Ground: The Belmont Ground; Whitstable; Kent
- Capacity: 3,000
- Chairman: Steve Clayton
- Manager: Lee Martin
- League: Isthmian League South East Division
- 2025–26: Southern Counties East League Premier Division, 1st of 19 (promoted)
| Home colours | Away colours |

Whitstable Town F.C. is a football club based in Whitstable, Kent, England. The club was established in 1885 and joined the Kent League in 1950. In the 2024–25 season, the team won the FA Vase. They were champions of the Kent League Premier Division in the 2006–07 season. They are currently members of the Isthmian League South East Division.

== History ==
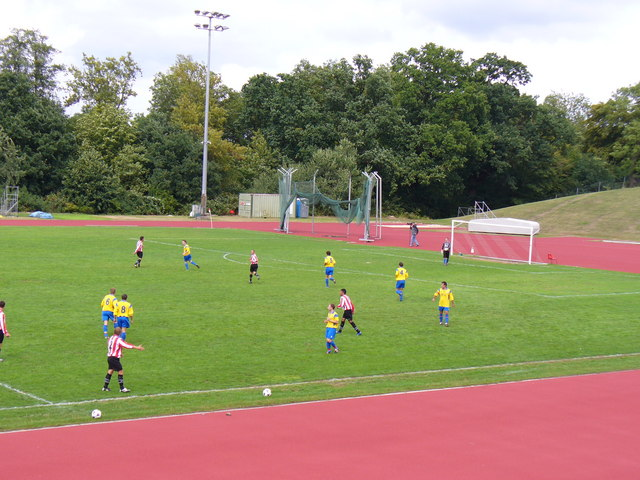
Whitstable (yellow shirts) take on Guildford City in a 2006 FA Cup tie

Although the first recorded football match in Whitstable was in 1885, the first record of Whitstable Town's existence was the following year. After a couple of years playing in a field behind the railway station, the club relocated to The Belmont Ground in 1888, where they play to this day.

In 1909 the Oystermen joined the original Kent League, where they played until it folded in 1959, winning the Division Two title three times. They also lifted the Kent Amateur Cup (now Kent Senior Trophy) in 1929. After the collapse of the Kent League, the club played for a while in the Aetolian League, but this meant long trips to play London teams as opposed to the earlier money-spinning East Kent derbies, and this was a period of financial struggle for the club, which dropped into the amateur leagues for a number of years.

In the late 1960s the Kent League reformed, with the Oystermen among the founder members. They also attracted national publicity in 1989 when striker Gerry Allen scored a goal after just 4 seconds of a match.

They had remained members of the Kent League until their promotion to the Isthmian League in 2007. The 2006–07 season marked the best in the club's history when supporter Tony Rouse took over as chairman from long time servant of the club Joe Brownett. Rouse appointed first team captain Marc Seager as the club's manager taking over from Matt Toms. Under Marc Seager's leadership the team won the Kent League and the Kent Senior Trophy. In 2012 former local referee Gary Johnson took over as chairman from Joe Brownett (after his second spell in the chair) but in 2015 Johnson was replaced once again by Joe Brownett (his third spell as chairman).

Whitstable spent nine seasons in the Isthmian League Division One South with a best placed 8th finish in the 2014–15 season. This is the highest level in the football pyramid that the club have played. Relegation at the end of 2015–16 season was followed by two seasons in the Southern Counties East Football League Premier Division with Scott Porter as manager.

Under manager Scott Porter the successful 2017-18 campaign resulted in a 2nd-place finish to Sevenoaks Town, good enough to secure promotion back to the Isthmian League, as well as two cup final victories. The first season in the newly formed Isthmian League South East division resulted in 12th place, the club's 2nd best finish at this level. In June 2019 the club merged with Whitstable Town Junior Football Club with ownership moving to a limited company with Steve Clayton as chairman and Lloyd Blackman taking over as manager from Porter. Whitstable were relegated to the Southern Counties East Football League at the end of the 2021–22 season.

On 11 May 2025, Whitstable won the FA Vase for the first time, defeating AFC Whyteleafe 2–1 in the final. Whitstable Town then reached the FA Cup 4th qualifying round for the first time in their history, losing 5–1 against National League club Wealdstone on 11 October 2025. The 2025–26 season ended in further success for the club, promoted back to step 4 as Premier Division champions.

== Ground ==
Whitstable Town play their home games at The Belmont Ground. The first recorded game at the ground took place in January 1888 with a friendly versus local rivals Herne Bay. The Belmont Ground boasts a traditional seated stand along one side as well as covered terracing behind each goal. The other buildings which make up the ground are dressing rooms, clubhouse, snack bar, committee room and office. Recently a classroom building has been added for the academy students. Floodlights were installed in the mid to late 1980s.

With it being considered one of the best grounds in the area it regularly hosts a number of cup finals for local junior football leagues come the end of the season.

The capacity of the ground is 3,000 with the average attendance for the 2018–19 season being 209.

In April 2022, the club revealed plans to install a plastic 3G pitch over the summer in time for the start of the 2022–23 season.

== Honours ==
League

- Southern Counties East Football League Premier Division
  - Champions: 2006–07, 2025–26
- Kent Amateur League (Eastern Division)
  - Champions: 1960–61
- Faversham & District League
  - Champions: 1922–23, 1923–24, 1937–38
- Kent League Division 2
  - Champions: 1933–34, 1949–50
- Kent League Division 2 (Mid Kent)
  - Champions: 1927–28
- New Brompton League
  - Champions: 1927–28, 1928–29, 1933–34, 1934–35
  - K Division Champions: 1948–49
- Thanet League
  - Champions: 1908–09, 1909–10, 1910–11

Cup

- FA Vase
  - Winners: 2024–25
- Kent Senior Cup
  - Runners–up: 2008–09, 2019–20
- Kent Senior Trophy
  - Winners: 2000–01, 2006–07, 2017–18, 2025–26
  - Runners–up: 2024–25
- Southern Counties East League Challenge Cup
  - Winners: 2017–18
- Kent League Shield
  - Winners: 2007–08
- Kent Amateur Cup
  - Winners: 1928–29
- Hurst Electrical Floodlit Cup
  - Winners: 1993–94
- Kent League Cup
  - Winners: 1979–80
- Faversham Charity Cup
  - Winners: 1935–36
- Canterbury Charity Cup
  - Winners: 1926–27

== Club records ==
- Best league position: 8th in Isthmian League Division One South (Step 4), 2014–15
- Best FA Cup performance: 4th qualifying round, 2025–26
- Best FA Trophy performance: 2nd round, 2013–14
- Best FA Vase performance: Winners, 2024–25
- Record attendance: 2,905 vs Hartpury University, FA Vase semi-finals, 29 March 2025
- Most appearances: Frank Cox, 429
- Most goals: Barry Godfrey
