= Folkestone F.C. =

Folkestone
- Nickname(s): the Magpies
- Founded: 1894 (maybe reformed 1945)
- Dissolved: 1990
- Ground: Cheriton Road

Folkestone Football Club was the name of two English football clubs based in the town of Folkestone, Kent. It is unclear if the two clubs were connected, but neither has any formal connection to Folkestone Invicta, founded in 1936, which took over the Cheriton Road stadium after the demise of Folkestone F.C. in 1990. Folkestone Invicta F.C. has since become the spiritual successor of the club, inheriting its history and Folkestone F.C.'s previous honours.

== History ==
The first Folkestone F.C. club was one of the founder members of the Kent League in 1894 but left that league in 1904. In 1923 the club resurfaced in the Southern League, where the team played until the Second World War.

The second Folkestone F.C. began life as Folkestone Town F.C., and played in the Kent League from 1945 until the league folded in 1959, whereupon the club joined the Southern League. In 1968 this club adopted the Folkestone F.C. name, followed in 1974 by another name change to Folkestone and Shepway F.C., which lasted for six years before the Shepway element was dropped. The club folded in 1990 and, although a new club, Folkestone Town (1990) F.C. was formed, it also folded without even completing a full season.

The various incarnations of the club managed between them to reach the third round proper of the FA Cup on two occasions.

== Ground ==
The club played on Cheriton Road.

== Honours ==
- Southern League Division One Champions 1963–64
- Central Section Champions, Southern League 1934–35
- Kent League Champions 1950–51, 1952–53
- Southern League Cup Winners 1934–35
- Kent League Cup Winners 1951–52
- Kent Senior Cup Winners 1933–34, 1956–57, 1968–69, 1977–78, 1982–83, 1984–85

== Former coach ==
- Jack Kirby, player-manager, (1938–39)
