= Ramsgate F.C. =

Association football club in England

Ramsgate FC
- Full name: Ramsgate Football Club
- Nickname: The Rams
- Founded: 1945
- Ground: Southwood Stadium, Ramsgate
- Capacity: 3,500
- Owner: James Lawson
- Manager: Adrian Pennock
- League: Isthmian League Premier Division
- 2025–26: Isthmian League Premier Division, 10th of 22
- Website: ramsgatefc.co.uk
Home colours	Away colours

Ramsgate Football Club are a football team based in Ramsgate, Kent, England. They are currently members of the Isthmian League Premier Division. The club was founded in 1945 and was known as Ramsgate Athletic until 1972. After playing in the original Kent League in the 1950s, Ramsgate joined the Southern League in 1959. In 1976 they resigned from this league and returned to county-level competition in a new Kent League. In 2005 Ramsgate gained promotion to the Isthmian League Division One and secured a second consecutive promotion to the Premier Division a year later. Following relegation in 2009, Ramsgate spent 16 seasons in the seventh tier of English football before securing promotion back to Step 3 in 2024–25, winning the Isthmian South East Division title with a 109-point haul.

Ramsgate play at Southwood Stadium, which has undergone significant improvement since 2020, including the laying of a new 3G pitch. The main local rivals of the club are Margate who are situated just four miles away. When the two teams meet, it is known as the Thanet derby.

== History ==
The earliest incarnation of Ramsgate FC had played since at least 1886 but folded in 1924, with local rivals Ramsgate Glenville taking over their Southwood Stadium. Glenville did not reform after World War II and a new club dubbed Ramsgate Athletic took over Southwood. The club retained the Athletic name until 1972.

Athletic played in the original incarnation of the Kent League from their formation until the collapse of the league in 1959. This was the club's best period for nearly 50 years, with two consecutive league titles, several county cups, and a run to the first round of the FA Cup. With the collapse of the Kent League the Rams migrated to the Southern League, where they initially did well but were forced to resign and drop down to the re-formed Kent League in 1976.

For nearly thirty years the club performed well without seriously challenging for promotion, but their fortunes changed in 2004 with the return of former manager Jim Ward. He led the club to two consecutive championships (Kent League Premier Division and Isthmian League First Division), taking the club into the Isthmian League Premier Division for 2006–07, which therefore offered the first derby matches for many years against Isle of Thanet rivals Margate. In the club's first season in the Premier Division the Rams finished in 9th place, and followed this with an even better season in 2007–08, finishing in 5th place to reach the play-offs, although they were beaten 2–1 in the semi-final by Staines Town. The Rams also won the Isthmian League Cup, beating AFC Sudbury on penalties at Dartford's Princes Park ground. The following season, however, Ramsgate finished bottom of the table and were relegated.

The 2023–24 season saw Ramsgate reach the second round proper of the FA Cup for the first time in the club's history, defeating National League club Woking 2–1 in the first round to earn a trip to League Two side AFC Wimbledon, who won the match 5–0. With the season having ended in disappointment with defeat in the play-offs, they were promoted as champions the following season.

== Stadium ==
The Rams play their home games at Southwood Stadium, currently known under a sponsorship deal as the WW Martin Community Stadium. The ground has historically been best known for two large terraces at the Town End and the Manston Airport End behind each goal. Southwood Stadium has been the home of football in Ramsgate since the late 1800s and became the home of Ramsgate Athletic in 1945. Around this time the pitch was rotated 90 degrees, a covered Main Stand, later renamed the Colin Hill Stand, was erected with wooden benches installed running the length of the pitch and land parallel to the opposite touchline was used as a training pitch. Both ends of the ground were covered soon after which remained in place until the Great Storm of 1987 caused irreparable damage which resulted in only one side of the ground being covered until 2007, when both ends were once again covered. In the late 2000s the wooden benches were replaced with red seating.

Little improvement had been made at Southwood prior to James Lawson taking over as chairman in December 2019. In June 2020 Ramsgate refurbished the old Sponsor's Lounge and built the Corner Flag Bar, a glass fronted lounge overlooking the pitch as well as installing two Panna Cages.

2021 saw the laying of a 3G pitch. The opening of the pitch was against Tottenham Hotspur on 17 July 2021. The pitch is an artificial 3G playing surface which is graded at FIFA Quality Pro level, the highest ranking available. A car park for 200 cars replaced the previous training pitch.

Further advancements were made to increase the match day experience in 2022 with an elevated deck built between the Corner Flag Bar and Colin Hill Stand and new bar areas added. This area was further developed in 2023 with the installation of three containers providing bars for both sponsors and supporters. Future plans for Southwood include a new stand and education hub on the car park side of the ground.

== Supporters ==
The old logo of the club

In the 2007–08 season, Ramsgate's average attendance was 369, the twelfth highest figure in the Isthmian League Premier Division. For the visit of rivals Margate the crowd was 1,210, nearly double the attendance at any other match. The 2011–12 season had an average attendance of 159, 2012–13 was 157, 2013–14 was 269, 2014–15 was 248, 2015–16 was 207 and 2016–17 was 237.

In the 2023–24 season the Rams average attendance grew to 1,075. During the season there was in excess of 1,000 fans at 14 games. 3,000 attended the FA Cup victory against Woking with over 2,500 watching the home draw with title rivals Cray Valley. 300 season tickets have been sold for the 2024–25 season.

== Current squad ==
As of 10 November 2026

Note: Flags indicate national team as defined under FIFA eligibility rules; some limited exceptions apply. Players may hold more than one non-FIFA nationality.

No.	Pos.	Nation	Player
2	DF	ENG	Henry Lukombo
3	DF	ENG	Raphe Brown
4	DF	ENG	Cameron James
5	DF	ENG	Dave Winfield (captain)
6	DF	ENG	Tom Clifford
7	FW	ENG	Benny Bioletti
8	MF	ENG	Bivesh Gurung
10	FW	ENG	Callum Jones
11	FW	ENG	Alfie Paxman

No.	Pos.	Nation	Player
12	MF	ENG	Jacob Bland
13	GK	SCO	Jonny Henly
18	MF	ENG	Billy Munday
19	MF	ENG	Finley Cotton
20	MF	ENG	TJ Jadama
23	MF	ENG	Oliver Jackson
24	FW	ENG	Latrell Lewis
25	FW	ENG	Rowan Liburd

=== Out on loan ===
Note: Flags indicate national team as defined under FIFA eligibility rules; some limited exceptions apply. Players may hold more than one non-FIFA nationality.

No.	Pos.	Nation	Player

== Club officials ==
=== Ramsgate FC ===
President: Lord Pendry
Director: James Lawson
Vice-presidents: Martin Able, Kevin Barham, David Butler, Ian Heath, Paul Jefcoat, Malcolm Mitchell, Steve Redford, Foy Turner, Colin West
General Manager: Ian Heath
Club Secretary: Ian Heath
Matchday Secretary: Rob Hughes
Media Officer: Dan Whitehead
Safety & Welfare Officer: James Lawson
Chief Scoreboard Operator and Matchday Communications Manager: Darius Sarrafan
Programme Editor: Dan Whitehead

=== Football management ===
Manager: Adrian Pennock
Assistant Manager : Roland Edge
Goalkeeping Coach : Les Cleevely
Firness Coach : Neil Withington
Sports Therapist: Georgina Dean
Kit Manager: Philip Butler

=== Managerial history ===
Name	Dates	Achievements
(England) Bob Harrop	1978 – 1981
(England) P.Gilbert	1981 – 1983
(England) S.Jest	1983 – 1985
(England) L.Smith	1985 – 1989	Kent Senior Trophy Winners 1988 & 1989
(England) Vic Medus	1989 – 1990
(England) Bob Wickens	1990 – 1992
(England) Paul Rimmer/ (England) Lennie Lee	1992 – 1993	Kent League Cup Winners 1993
(England) Lennie Lee	1993 – 1996	Kent League Cup Winners 1994 & 1995; Kent League Charity Shield Winners 1994 & 1995
(Scotland) Jim Ward	July 1996 – June 2001	Kent League Charity Shield Winners 1997; Kent League Champions 1999; Kent Senior Trophy Winners 1999; Kent League Cup Winners 2001
(England) Peter Hook	July 2001 – March 2004
(Scotland) Jim Ward	March 2004 – April 2012	Kent League Champions 2005; Kent League Cup Winners 2005; Kent League Charity Shield Winners 2005; Isthmian League Division One Champions 2006; FA Cup 1st round 2005–06; Isthmian League Cup Winners 2008; Isthmian League Premier Play Offs 2007–08
(England) Tim Dixon	April 2012 – February 2014
(England) Dean Hill & Mark Weatherly (Caretaker managers)	March 2014
(England) Justin Luchford	March 2014 – May 2014
(England) Dean Hill	May 2014 – January 2015
(England) Simon Halsey	January 2015 – May 2015
(Scotland) Jim Ward/Danny Ward	May 2015 – January 2017
(England) Lloyd Blackman	January 2017 – December 2018
(England) Nick Davis	December 2018 – September 2019
(England) Jason Lillis	October 2019 – December 2019
(England) Matt Longhurst	December 2019 – April 2022
(Wales) Steve Lovell	April 2022 – January 2023
(England) Jamie Coyle	February 2023 – April 2023
(England) Ben Smith	May 2023 – November 2025	Isthmian League South East Division champions 2024–25; FA Cup 2nd Round 2023–24; FA Trophy 1st Round 2023–24
(England) Lee Martin	November 2025 - April 2026
(England) Adrian Pennock	April 2026 - Present

== Honours ==
- Isthmian League
  - South East Division champions 2024–25
  - First Division Champions 2005–06
  - League Cup Winners 2007–08
- Kent League
  - Champions 1948–49, 1955–56, 1956–57, 1998–99, 2004–05
  - League Cup Winners 1948–49, 1992–93, 1993–94, 1994–95, 2000–01, 2004–05
- Thames & Medway Combination Champions' Cup
  - Winners 1959–60
- Thames & Medway Combination Eastern Division Champions
  - 1958–59, 1959–60, 1960–61
- Kent Senior Cup
  - Winners 1963–64
- Kent Senior Shield
  - Winners 1960–61, 1967–68, 1968–69
- Kent Senior Trophy
  - Winners 1987–88, 1988–89, 1998–99
- Kent League Charity Shield
  - Winners 1994, 1995, 1997, 2005

== Records ==
- Best league performance: 5th in Isthmian League Premier Division (level 7), 2007–08
- Best FA Cup performance: 2nd round proper, 2023–24
- Best FA Trophy performance: 1st round proper, 2023–24
- Best FA Vase performance: Quarter-finals, 1999–2000
- Record attendance: 5,038 vs Margate, 1956–57
- Biggest victory: 11–0 and 12–1 vs Canterbury City, Kent League, 2000–01
- Most Apps: Warren Schulz (458)
- Most goals: Joe Taylor (170)
