= Kent Senior Cup =

- Founded: 1889
- Region: Kent
- Teams: 25 (2025–26)
- Current champions: Maidstone United
- Most championships: Maidstone United (20 times)
- Website: 2025–26 Fixtures / Results

The Kent Senior Cup is an English football knock-out competition played between senior clubs in the county of Kent. It is administered by the Kent County Football Association (KCFA).

Maidstone United are the current champions, defeating Tonbridge Angels 2–0 in the 2025–26 final.

== History ==
Now known as the Kent Senior Cup it was originally named, until the 1897–98 season, as the Kent Cup with the first competition played during the 1888–89 season. The cup itself, engraved as the "Kent County Football Association Challenge Cup", cost £33 and is made of 62 ounces of silver and surmounted by the rampant horse of Kent. (2018 Photograph). The Kent Cup competition was preceded as the KCFA's County knock-out tournament by the Kent County Badge: this was first competed for in 1886 and won for each of its three seasons by Chatham – who were also the first winners of the Kent Cup.

Following the founding of the Kent League in 1894 for the three seasons from 1894–95 until 1896–97 the Kent Cup was awarded to the champions of the League. The knock-out competition for the cup resumed from the 1897–98 season when it was renamed the Kent Senior Cup, with Gravesend United the winners. For the 1919–1920 season only a trophy presented as a gift to the KCFA named as the Victory Cup replaced the Kent Senior Cup trophy. The competition was suspended for four seasons between 1914 and 1918 owing to the World War I and there have been two other seasons in which the Kent Senior Cup has not been competed for: in 1940–1941 owing to World War II; and 2020–2021 owing to the COVID-19 pandemic.

Initially the final of the competition was played at a venue pre-selected by the KCFA: for the first six seasons this was at Chatham, then after taking place at New Brompton, Ashford, Tunbridge Wells and returning to Chatham for one season the final was held at Faversham for the next six years. For a long spell between 1908 until 1950 the venue for the final was the Athletic Ground, Maidstone (except 1942 at Belvedere). Thereafter the final was held mostly at the Priestfield Stadium, Gillingham until 1965 after which for the next eight seasons it was contested (as it had been in the 1961–62 season) over two legs held at each of the finalists ground with the aggregate score determining the winner. The venue for the final then reverted to Maidstone then to Gillingham for fourteen seasons. Then following playing the final at Sittingbourne and for the first time outside Kent at Millwall, since 1998 (with several exceptions) the winner of a coin toss between the final protagonists decided which would have the choice to host the final match. The semi–finals were played on neutral grounds until the mid-1950s.

From 1902 until 1961 the final took place on Easter Monday and into the 1950s would attract in excess of ten thousand spectators – 13,119 were at the 1951–1952 final between Kent League club Dover and Southern League club Dartford. Between 1983 until 2002 the final was held on the early May bank holiday however since then the final has struggled for a set date owing to end of season promotion and relegation play-off matches and in the 2007–08 season was even deferred until the 2008–09 pre–season.

The 2013–14 Kent Senior Cup competition marked the 125th anniversary since its inception in the 1888–89 season; to celebrate the landmark the final took place at Priestfield Stadium, home of Gillingham FC. The match was won by Ebbsfleet United who beat Dover Athletic 4–0 – the winning club being a descendant of Northfleet United who in the 1920s achieved an enduring record of five consecutive season Kent Senior Cup wins.

Past winners of the Kent Senior Cup include Royal Arsenal (now Arsenal) in 1889–90, and Gillingham in 1945–46 and 1947–48; the two sides went on to become members of the Premier League and Football League respectively. Both Charlton Athletic and Maidstone United won the cup whilst members of the Football league and Gillingham have continued to compete. The Football League clubs field a development team rather than their full league side in the competition.

=== Sponsorship ===
For the following periods the Kent Senior Cup has been sponsored by:

- 1980–1986: the Chatham Reliance Building Society
- 1986–1997: Facit, the Rochester based Swedish office business machine company
- 2001–?: Bose
- 2003–2007: John Ullman, named after the Kent football patron
- 2010–2014: portablefoodlights.com
- 2014–2018: Kent Reliance Building society who revived their sponsorship from thirty years previously
- 2022–2025: DFDS, the ferry operator (who sponsored all the Kent County Cups)
- 2025–present: GoCardless, the payment platform provider (who sponsored all the Kent County Cups)

== Cup Final Matches ==
KENT SENIOR CUP: THE CUP FINAL MATCHES (includes Kent County Badge finals and seasons’ semi-finalists)
Season	Winner	Score	Runner-up	Notes	Date	Venue	Beaten semi-finalists(by: Winner / Runner-up)
	KENT COUNTY BADGE FINALS						
1885–86	Chatham	3–1	South Eastern; Rangers		10 Apr 1886	Ashford(Victoria Grnd)	(bye) / Chatham Victoria
1886–87	Chatham	8–0	Chatham Victoria		26 Mar 1887	Chatham (The Lines)	(bye) / Chatham Standard
1887–88	Chatham	0–0	South Eastern; Rangers		17 Mar 1888	Bromley	Gravesend / Folkestone
1887–88	Chatham	6–1	South Eastern; Rangers	Replay	31 Mar 1888	Ashford (Vic)	Gravesend / Folkestone
	KENT SENIOR CUP FINALS (KENT CUP 1889–1897)						
1888–89	Chatham	3–1	South Eastern; Rangers		6 Apr 1889	Chatham	Gravesend / Folkestone
1889–90	Royal Arsenal	3–0	Thanet; Wanderers		22 Mar 1890	Chatham	Chatham / South Eastern Rangers
1890–91	Lincoln; Regiment	2–1	South Eastern; Rangers		11 Apr 1891	Chatham	Chatham / Royal Arsenal
1891–92	Highland Light Infantry	11–0	Gravesend		12 Mar 1892	Chatham	Chatham / Ashford United
1892–93	Ashford United	2–0	Chatham		8 Apr 1893	Chatham	West Kent Regiment / Sheppey United
1893–94	Royal Ordnance; Factories	4–2	Dartford		7 Apr 1894	Chatham	Folkestone / New Brompton
1894–95	Chatham	Cup awarded to the Kent League champions					
1895–96	Northfleet	Cup awarded to the Kent League champions					
1896–97	Woolwich Arsenal; Reserves	Cup awarded to the Kent League champions					
1897–98	Gravesend; United	3–1	Dartford		2 Apr 1898	New Brompton	Sheppey United / Chatham
1898–99	Maidstone United	1–0	Folkestone		25 Mar 1899	Ashford	Royal Engineers Utd / Dartford
1899– 1900	Gravesend; United	1–1	Maidstone United		14 Apr 1900	Tunbridge Wells	Dartford / Folkestone
1899– 1900	Gravesend; United	4–1	Maidstone United	Replay	30 Apr 1900	Chatham	Dartford / Folkestone
1900–01	Maidstone United	3–0	Cray Wanderers		13 Apr 1901	Chatham	Sheppey United / Chatham Amateurs
1901–02	Sittingbourne	2–2	Ashford United		31 Mar 1902	Faversham	Swanscombe / Sheppey United
1901–02	Sittingbourne	4–1	Ashford United	Replay	12 Apr 1902	Ramsgate	Swanscombe / Sheppey United
1902–03	Maidstone United	2–1	Ashford United		13 Apr 1903	Faversham	Sittingbourne / Eltham
1903–04	Eltham	4–1	Sittingbourne		4 Apr 1904	Faversham	Cray Wanderers / Dover
1904–05	Chatham	3–1	Sittingbourne		24 Apr 1905	Faversham	Dover / Eltham
1905–06	Eltham	1–0	Bromley		16 Apr 1906	Faversham	Southern United / Sittingbourne
1906–07	Maidstone United	1–0	Sittingbourne		1 Apr 1907	Faversham	Eltham / Sheppey United
1907–08	Tunbridge Wells; Rangers	1–0	Sittingbourne		20 Apr 1908	Maidstone	Sheppey United / Maidstone United
1908–09	Maidstone United	4–2	Northfleet United		12 Apr 1909	Maidstone	Tunbridge Wells Rngrs / Sittingbourne
1909–10	Northfleet United	2–0	Chatham		28 Mar 1910	Maidstone	Dartford / Maidstone United
1910–11	Chatham	2–1	Sittingbourne		17 Apr 1911	Maidstone	Sheppey United / Gravesend United
1911–12	Catford Southend	3–0	Chatham		8 Apr 1912	Maidstone	Bromley / Sittingbourne
1912–13	Northfleet United	2–1	Gravesend; United		24 Mar 1913	Maidstone	Tunbridge Wells Rngrs / Chatham
1913–14	Maidstone United	1–0	Northfleet United		13 Apr 1914	Maidstone	Folkestone / Chatham
1914–18	Competition suspended for 4 seasons owing to World War I						
1918–19	Chatham	3–0	Maidstone United	Victory Cup	21 Apr 1919	Maidstone	Royal Marines (Deal) /Royal Ordnance (W'wich)
1919–20	Maidstone United	2–1	Northfleet United		5 Apr 1920	Maidstone	Sheppey United / Sittingbourne
1920–21	Northfleet United	1–0	Ramsgate		28 Mar 1921	Maidstone	Sittingbourne / Chatham
1921–22	Maidstone United	1–0	Folkestone		17 Apr 1922	Maidstone	Margate Town / Dartford
1922–23	Maidstone United	3–2	Sittingbourne		2 Apr 1923	Maidstone	Ashford Railway Wks; Folkestone
1923–24	Northfleet United	1–0	Dartford		21 Apr 1924	Maidstone	Sittingbourne / Sheppey United
1924–25	Northfleet United	8–2	Sittingbourne		13 Apr 1925	Maidstone	Grays Thurrock Utd / Folkestone
1925–26	Northfleet United	1–0	Folkestone		5 Apr 1926	Maidstone	Chatham / Dartford
1926–27	Northfleet United	1–0	Sheppey United		18 Apr 1927	Maidstone	Chatham / RN Depot
1927–28	Northfleet United	3–1	Sittingbourne		9 Apr 1928	Maidstone	RN Depot / Cray Wanderers
1928–29	Sittingbourne	1–1	Sheppey United		1 Apr 1929	Maidstone	Chatham / Folkestone
1928–29	Sittingbourne	1–0	Sheppey United	Replay	3 Apr 1929	Gillingham	Chatham / Folkestone
1929–30	Sittingbourne	3–0	Margate		21 Apr 1930	Maidstone	Northfleet United / Folkestone
1930–31	Dartford	2–2	Folkestone		6 Apr 1931	Maidstone	Ashford Town /Tunbridge Wells Rngrs
1930–31	Dartford	5–2	Folkestone	Replay	8 Apr 1931	Maidstone	Ashford Town /Tunbridge Wells Rngrs
1931–32	Dartford	2–0	Sheppey United		28 Mar 1932	Maidstone	Chatham /Tunbridge Wells Rngrs
1932–33	Dartford	0–0	Tunbridge Wells; Rangers		17 Apr 1933	Maidstone	Margate / Folkestone
1932–33	Dartford	2–0	Tunbridge Wells; Rangers	Replay	19 Apr 1933	Northfleet	Margate / Folkestone
1933–34	Folkestone	3–0	Margate		2 Apr 1934	Maidstone	Northfleet United / Ramsgate Press Wndrs
1934–35	Dartford	3–2	Folkestone		22 Apr 1935	Maidstone	Tunbridge Wells Rngrs / Northfleet United
1935–36	Margate	2–1	Tunbridge Wells; Rangers		13 Apr 1936	Maidstone	Northfleet United / Sittingbourne
1936–37	Margate	3–2	Tunbridge Wells; Rangers		29 Mar 1937	Maidstone	Northfleet United / Folkestone
1937–38	Northfleet United	2–1	Dover		18 Apr 1938	Maidstone	Margate / Bexley Heath & Welling
1938–39	Tunbridge Wells; Rangers	4–0	Gillingham		10 Apr 1939	Maidstone	Erith & Belvedere / Northfleet United
1939–40	Shorts Sports	6–1	Dartford		25 Mar 1940	Maidstone	Canterbury Waverley / Aylesford Paper Mills
1940–41	Competition suspended owing to World War II						
1941–42	Erith & Belvedere	2–1	Shorts Sports		25 May 1942	Belvedere	Bromley / Gravesend United
1942–43	Royal Artillery; Depot (Woolwich)	1–0	Shorts Sports		27 Apr 1943	Maidstone	Gravesend United / Lloyds
1943–44	Royal Artillery; Depot (Woolwich)	5–3	Gravesend; United		10 Apr 1944	Maidstone	Bromley / Folkestone
1944–45	Royal Artillery; Depot (Woolwich)	5–1	Lloyds		2 Apr 1945	Maidstone	12th ITC (Canterbury) / Gillingham
1945–46	Gillingham	5–1	12th ITC (Canterbury)		22 Apr 1946	Maidstone	Gravesend United / Erith & Belvedere
1946–47	Dartford	3–2	Bromley		7 Apr 1947	Maidstone	Gillingham / Folkestone Town
1947–48	Gillingham	1–0	Gravesend & Northfleet		29 Mar 1948	Maidstone	Sheppey United / Bromley
1948–49	Gravesend & Northfleet	2–2	Gillingham	After extra time (aet)	18 Apr 1949	Maidstone	Dartford / Folkestone Town
1948–49	Gravesend & Northfleet	1–1	Gillingham	Replay (aet)	14 May 1949	Gillingham	Dartford / Folkestone Town
1948–49	Gravesend & Northfleet	2–0	Gillingham	2nd Replay	31 Aug 1949	Gillingham	Dartford / Folkestone Town
1949–50	Bromley	1–1	Gillingham		10 Apr 1950	Maidstone	Dover / Folkestone Town
1949–50	Bromley	5–3	Gillingham	Replay	19 Apr 1950	Gillingham	Dover / Folkestone Town
1950–51	Snowdown; Colliery Welfare	0–0	Bromley		26 Mar 1951	Gillingham	Sittingbourne / Dartford
1950–51	Snowdown; Colliery Welfare	2–1	Bromley	Replay (aet)	19 May 1951	Gillingham	Sittingbourne / Dartford
1951–52	Dover	2–0	Dartford		14 Apr 1952	Gillingham	Bromley / Sittingbourne
1952–53	Gravesend & Northfleet	2–1	Dartford		6 Apr 1953	Gillingham	Folkestone Town / Bromley
1953–54	Canterbury City	1–0	Tunbridge Wells; United		19 Apr 1954	Gillingham	Dover / Gravesend & Northfleet
1954–55	Tunbridge Wells; United	2–1	Dartford		11 Apr 1955	Gillingham	Tonbridge / Dover
1955–56	Snowdown; Colliery Welfare	1–1	Dartford		2 Apr 1956	Gillingham	Ramsgate Athletic / Canterbury City
1955–56	Snowdown; Colliery Welfare	2–0	Dartford	Replay	18 Apr 1956	Gillingham	Ramsgate Athletic / Canterbury City
1956–57	Folkestone Town	2–0	Tonbridge		22 Apr 1957	Gillingham	Canterbury City / Tunbridge Wells Utd
1957–58	Sittingbourne	1–0	Ramsgate; Athletic		07 Apr 1958	Gillingham	Dartford / Margate
1958–59	Ashford Town	2–1	Tonbridge		30 Mar 1959	Gillingham	Dover /Snowdown Coll. Welf.
1959–60	Dover	0–0	Margate		18 Apr 1960	Maidstone	Bromley / Dartford
1959–60	Dover	1–0	Margate	Replay (aet)	28 Apr 1960	Folkestone	Bromley / Dartford
1960–61	Bexleyheath & Welling	3–0	Sittingbourne		3 Apr 1961	Maidstone	Cray Wanderers / Dover
1961–62	Dover	1–1	Ashford Town	1st Leg	23 Apr 1962	Dover	Ramsgate Athletic / Margate
1961–62	Dover	1–1	Ashford Town	2nd Leg (aet)	12 May 1962	Ashford	Ramsgate Athletic / Margate
1961–62	Dover	2–2	Ashford Town	Aggregate score (after both legs)			Ramsgate Athletic / Margate
1961–62	Dover	4–1	Ashford Town	Play-off	20 Aug 1962	Folkestone	Ramsgate Athletic / Margate
1962–63	Ashford Town	1–0	Margate		11 May 1963	Gillingham	Tonbridge / Dartford
1963–64	Ramsgate; Athletic	3–1	Maidstone United		25 Apr 1964	Gillingham	Bexley United / Folkestone Town
1964–65	Tonbridge	3–0	Bexley United		19 Apr 1965	Gillingham	Ramsgate Athletic / Dover
1965–66	Maidstone United	1–1	Ramsgate; Athletic	1st Leg	26 Apr 1966	Ramsgate	Margate / Dover
1965–66	Maidstone United	3–1	Ramsgate; Athletic	2nd Leg	10 May 1966	Maidstone	Margate / Dover
1965–66	Maidstone United	4–2	Ramsgate; Athletic	Aggregate score (after both legs)			Margate / Dover
1966–67	Dover	5–0	Margate	1st Leg	3 Apr 1967	Margate	Dartford / Ramsgate Athletic
1966–67	Dover	1–0	Margate	2nd Leg	6 Apr 1967	Dover	Dartford / Ramsgate Athletic
1966–67	Dover	6–0	Margate	Aggregate score (after both legs)			Dartford / Ramsgate Athletic
1967–68	Dover	1–2	Bexley United	1st Leg	24 Apr 1968	Bexley	Tonbridge/ Gravesend & Northfleet
1967–68	Dover	3–0	Bexley United	2nd Leg (aet)	8 May 1968	Dover	Tonbridge/ Gravesend & Northfleet
1967–68	Dover	4–2	Bexley United	Aggregate score (after both legs)			Tonbridge/ Gravesend & Northfleet
1968–69	Folkestone	4–0	Margate	1st Leg	30 Apr 1969	Folkestone	Herne Bay / Bexley United
1968–69	Folkestone	0–2	Margate	2nd Leg	8 May 1969	Margate	Herne Bay / Bexley United
1968–69	Folkestone	4–2	Margate	Aggregate score (after both legs)			Herne Bay / Bexley United
1969–70	Dartford	1–0	Margate	1st Leg	4 May 1970	Margate	Erith & Belvedere / Folkestone
1969–70	Dartford	4–1	Margate	2nd Leg	9 May 1970	Dartford	Erith & Belvedere / Folkestone
1969–70	Dartford	5–1	Margate	Aggregate score (after both legs)			Erith & Belvedere / Folkestone
1970–71	Dover	1–0	Dartford	1st Leg	19 Apr 1971	Dover	Ashford Town / Sheppey United
1970–71	Dover	2–2	Dartford	2nd Leg	28 Apr 1971	Dartford	Ashford Town / Sheppey United
1970–71	Dover	3–2	Dartford	Aggregate score (after both legs)			Ashford Town / Sheppey United
1971–72	Dover	2–0	Dartford	1st Leg	5 Apr 1972	Dover	Canterbury City / Sheppey United
1971–72	Dover	1–2	Dartford	2nd Leg	13 Apr 1972	Dartford	Canterbury City / Sheppey United
1971–72	Dover	3–2	Dartford	Aggregate score (after both legs)			Canterbury City / Sheppey United
1972–73	Dartford	6–2	Folkestone	1st Leg	26 Mar 1973	Dartford	Canterbury City / Maidstone United
1972–73	Dartford	4–2	Folkestone	2nd Leg	4 Apr 1973	Folkestone	Canterbury City / Maidstone United
1972–73	Dartford	10–4	Folkestone	Aggregate score (after both legs)			Canterbury City / Maidstone United
1973–74	Margate	2–0	Maidstone United		13 Apr 1974	Maidstone	Canterbury City / Bexley United
1974–75	Tonbridge	2–1	Maidstone United		5 Apr 1975	Maidstone	Dartford / Ashford Town
1975–76	Maidstone United	1–0	Canterbury City	After extra time (aet)	30 Apr 1976	Maidstone	Margate / Bexley United
1976–77	Bromley	1–0	Gravesend & Northfleet		30 Apr 1977	Maidstone	Ashford Town / Dartford
1977–78	Folkestone and Shepway	1–0	Maidstone United		15 Apr 1978	Maidstone	Sheppey United/ Gravesend & Northfleet
1978–79	Maidstone United	2–1	Dartford	After extra time (aet)	16 Apr 1979	Maidstone	Gravesend & Northfleet / Sheppey United
1979–80	Maidstone United	1–0	Dartford		7 Apr 1980	Maidstone	Bromley / Dover
1980–81	Gravesend & Northfleet	2–0	Ashford Town		20 Apr 1981	Maidstone	Maidstone United / Dover
1981–82	Maidstone United	3–0	Ashford Town		12 Apr 1982	Gillingham	Tonbridge Angels /Gravesend & Northfleet
1982–83	Folkestone	4–0	Dover		2 May 1983	Gillingham	Bromley / Maidstone United
1983–84	Fisher Athletic	1–0	Maidstone United		7 May 1984	Gillingham	Folkestone / Ashford Town
1984–85	Folkestone	4–2	Welling United		6 May 1985	Gillingham	Thanet United / Fisher Athletic
1985–86	Welling United	2–0	Dover Athletic		5 May 1986	Gillingham	Gravesend & Northfleet / Dartford
1986–87	Dartford	2–0	Maidstone United		4 May 1987	Gillingham	Ashford Town / Fisher Athletic
1987–88	Dartford	1–0	Maidstone United		3 May 1988	Gillingham	Welling United / Bromley
1988–89	Maidstone United	1–0	Welling United	After extra time (aet)	1 May 1989	Gillingham	Dartford / Gravesend & Northfleet
1989–90	Maidstone United	1–0	Gillingham		7 May 1990	Gillingham	Dover Athletic / Dartford
1990–91	Dover Athletic	1–0	Gravesend & Northfleet		6 May 1991	Gillingham	Gillingham / Maidstone United
1991–92	Bromley	3–1	Hythe Town	After extra time (aet)	4 May 1992	Gillingham	Dartford / Ashford Town
1992–93	Ashford Town	3–2	Bromley		3 May 1993	Gillingham	Gravesend & Northfleet; Welling United
1993–94	Margate	2–1	Dover Athletic		2 May 1994	Gillingham	Charlton Athletic / Welling United
1994–95	Charlton Athletic	4–2	Gillingham	After extra time (aet)	8 May 1995	Gillingham	Tonbridge Angels / Fisher
1995–96	Ashford Town	3–0	Charlton Athletic		6 May 1996	Sittingbourne	Gillingham / Fisher
1996–97	Bromley	4–1	Dover Athletic		5 May 1997	Millwall	Gillingham / Fisher Athletic
1997–98	Margate	1–0	Gravesend & Northfleet		4 May 1998	Northfleet	Gillingham / Dover Athletic
1998–99	Welling United	1–0	Folkestone; Invicta		3 May 1999	Folkestone	Margate / Fisher Athletic
1999– 2000	Gravesend & Northfleet	3–0	Folkestone; Invicta		1 May 2000	Northfleet	Dartford / Dover Athletic
2000–01	Gravesend & Northfleet	4–0	Dover Athletic		7 May 2001	Dover	Folkestone Invicta / Bromley
2001–02	Gravesend & Northfleet	5–0	Margate		6 May 2002	Margate	Fisher Athletic / Ashford Town
2002–03	Margate	2–1	Welling United	After extra time (aet)	30 Apr 2003	Welling	Erith & Belvedere / Bromley
2003–04	Margate	2–1	Folkestone; Invicta		28 Apr 2004	Folkestone	Dover Athletic / Bromley
2004–05	Margate	2–1	Dover Athletic		2 May 2005	Folkestone	Folkestone Invicta / Gravesend & Northfleet
2005–06	Bromley	3–2	Gravesend & Northfleet	After extra time (aet)	27 Apr 2006	Bromley	Ramsgate / Margate
2006–07	Bromley	3–1	Tonbridge Angels		24 Apr 2007	Bromley	Ashford Town / Maidstone United
2007–08	Ebbsfleet United	4–0	Cray Wanderers		26 Jul 2008	Bromley	Margate / Bromley
2008–09	Welling United	6–1	Whitstable Town		16 Apr 2009	Welling	Ramsgate / Bromley
2009–10	Sittingbourne	3–1	Folkestone; Invicta		4 May 2010	Folkestone	Cray Wanderers / Welling United
2010–11	Dartford	4–1	Bromley		2 May 2011	Dartford	Ramsgate / Cray Wanderers
2011–12	Hythe Town	1–0	Dartford		24 Apr 2012	Dartford	Dover Athletic / Charlton Athletic
2012–13	Charlton Athletic	7–1	Tonbridge Angels		1 May 2013	Tonbridge	Thamesmead / Ebbsfleet United
2013–14	Ebbsfleet United	4–0	Dover Athletic		5 May 2014	Gillingham	Whitstable Town / Bromley
2014–15	Charlton Athletic	1–0	Gillingham		30 Apr 2015	Gillingham	Ramsgate / Margate
2015–16	Dartford	3–1	Charlton Athletic		26 Apr 2016	Dartford	Greenwich Borough / Ebbsfleet United
2016–17	Dover Athletic	2–0	Welling United		1 May 2017	Maidstone	Folkestone Invicta / Charlton Athletic
2017–18	Maidstone United	0–0	Folkestone; Invicta		24 Apr 2018	Maidstone	Bromley / Charlton Athletic
2017–18	Maidstone United	(4–2 p)	Folkestone; Invicta	Penalty shots	24 Apr 2018	Maidstone	Bromley / Charlton Athletic
2018–19	Maidstone United	1–1	Bromley		16 Apr 2019	Bromley	Gillingham / Tonbridge Angels
2018–19	Maidstone United	(3–2 p)	Bromley	Penalty shots	16 Apr 2019	Bromley	Gillingham / Tonbridge Angels
2019–20	Dartford	6–1	Whitstable Town	Final; Delayed	24 Nov 2021	Dartford	Phoenix Sports / Gillingham
2020–21	Competition suspended owing to the COVID-19 pandemic						
2021–22	Dartford	6–2	Folkestone; Invicta		17 May 2022	Chatham	Welling United / Hythe Town
2022–23	Margate	1–1	Chatham Town		3 May 2023	Gillingham	Ramsgate / Welling United
2022–23	Margate	(5–4 p)	Chatham Town	Penalty shots	3 May 2023	Gillingham	Ramsgate / Welling United
2023–24	Maidstone United	4–0	Ebbsfleet United		17 Apr 2024	Bromley	Dartford / Chatham Town
2024–25	Welling United	1–0	Ebbsfleet United		2 Apr 2025	Gillingham	Dover Athletic / Tonbridge Angels
2025–26	Maidstone United	2–0	Tonbridge Angels		22 Apr 2026	Gillingham	Ebbsfleet United / Chatham Town

== Record by Club ==
(As of matches played 22 April 2026}

There have been 32 clubs (including follow-on clubs) who have won the Kent Senior Cup; a further seven clubs have competed in the final without winning; and an additional 14 clubs reached the semi-final stage but didn't progress to the final match.

KENT SENIOR CUP FINALS: RECORD BY CLUB
(excludes the County Badge and occasions the cup was awarded to the Kent League champions)

Rank ( † )	Club ( ‡ )	Latest win	Winner	Runner- up	Finalist	Beaten Semi- finalist	Semi- finalist
1	Maidstone United: (1897–1992) & (1992 >)	2025–26	20	9	29	7	36
2	Dartford	2021–22	13	13	26	19	45
3	Dover / Dover Athletic	2016–17	9	8	17	17	34
4	Margate / Margate Town / Thanet United	2022–23	9	8	17	12	29
5	Northfleet United	1937–38	9	3	12	6	18
6	Ebbsfleet United / Gravesend & Northfleet	2013–14	8	7	15	12	27
7	Folkestone / Folkestone and Shepway / Folkestone Town / Folkestone Invicta	1984–85	6	12	18	21	39
8	Bromley	2006–07	6	6	12	17	29
9	Sittingbourne	2009–10	5	9	14	10	24
10	Ashford United / Ashford Town / Ashford Railway Works	1995–96	5	5	10	11	21
11	Chatham Town / Chatham / Chatham Amateurs	1918–19	4	4	8	14	22
12	Welling United	2024–25	4	4	8	6	14
13	Tunbridge Wells Rangers / Tunbridge Wells United	1954–55	3	4	7	6	13
14	Charlton Athletic	2014–15	3	2	5	4	9
15	Royal Artillery Depot Woolwich	1944–45	3	0	3	0	3
16	Gillingham / New Brompton	1947–48	2	6	8	9	17
17	Tonbridge / Tonbridge Angels	1974–75	2	5	7	7	14
18	Gravesend / Gravesend United	1899– 1900	2	3	5	5	10
19	Eltham	1905–06	2	0	2	3	5
20	Snowdown Colliery Welfare	1955–56	2	0	2	1	3
21	Ramsgate / Ramsgate Athletic	1963–64	1	3	4	9	13
22	Bexleyheath & Welling / Bexley United	1960–61	1	2	3	5	8
23	Shorts Sports	1939–40	1	2	3	0	3
24	Canterbury Waverley / Canterbury City	1953–54	1	1	2	6	8
25	Hythe Town	2011–12	1	1	2	1	3
26	Fisher Athletic / Fisher	1983–84	1	0	1	7	8
27	Erith & Belvedere	1941–42	1	0	1	4	5
28	Royal Arsenal	1889–90	1	0	1	1	2
29	Catford Southend	1911–12	1	0	1	0	1
30	Royal Ordnance Factory	1893–94	1	0	1	0	1
31	Highland Light Infantry	1891–92	1	0	1	0	1
32	Lincoln Regiment	1890–91	1	0	1	0	1
33	Sheppey United	–	0	3	3	14	17
34	Cray Wanderers	–	0	2	2	5	7
35	Whitstable Town	–	0	2	2	1	3
36	South Eastern Rangers	–	0	2	2	1	3
37	12th ITC (Canterbury)	–	0	1	1	1	2
38	Lloyds	–	0	1	1	1	2
39	Thanet Wanderers	–	0	1	1	0	1
40	Royal Naval Depot (Chatham)	–	0	0	0	2	2
41	Phoenix Sports	–	0	0	0	1	1
42	Greenwich Borough	–	0	0	0	1	1
43	Thamesmead	–	0	0	0	1	1
44	Herne Bay	–	0	0	0	1	1
45	Aylesford PM	–	0	0	0	1	1
46	Ramsgate Press United	–	0	0	0	1	1
47	Grays Thurrock United	–	0	0	0	1	1
48	Royal Marines (Deal)	–	0	0	0	1	1
49	Royal Ordnance (Woolwich)	–	0	0	0	1	1
50	Southern United	–	0	0	0	1	1
51	Swanscombe	–	0	0	0	1	1
52	Royal Engineers United	–	0	0	0	1	1
53	West Kent Regiment	–	0	0	0	1	1

Notes
†: "Rank" calculated by wins, then runner-up, then semi-finals, then latest year (of the deciding factor).
‡: "Club" allows for follow-on of disbanded clubs (as indicated) and excludes significant
club amalgamations.

== Winning / Losing Sequences ==
(As of matches played 22 April 2026}

Consecutive Final wins:

- 5: Northfleet United 1924 to 1928.
- 3: Dartford, 1931 to 1933; Royal Artillery Depot (Woolwich) 1943 to 1945; Gravesend & Northfleet 2000 to 2002; Margate 2003 to 2005.

Consecutive Final losses:

- 2: Ten clubs have lost two finals consecutively on 17 occasions: Dartford (5, including losing in two separate 5 season periods two consecutive finals twice); Ashford United / Ashford Town (2); Maidstone United (2); Sittingbourne (2, both in a 5-season period); Ebbsfleet United (1); Folkestone Invicta (1); Gillingham (1); Margate (1); Shorts Sports (1); Tunbridge Wells Rngrs (1).

Run of winning the Final match (not consecutive):

- 7: Northfleet United between 1921 and 1938; Dover between 1952 and 1972.
- 6: Maidstone United. Twice: between 1901 and 1914 & between 1989 and 2026 (current run)

Run of losing the Final match (not consecutive):

- 8: Sittingbourne between 1904 and 1928.
- 6: Folkestone Invicta between 1999 and 2022 (current run).
- 5: Gillingham between 1949 and 2015 (current run); Margate between 1960 and 1970; Dover Athletic between 1994 and 2014.

Run of winning a Semi-final match (not consecutive):

- 11: Northfleet United between 1909 and 1928.
- 7: Maidstone United between 1914 and 1966.
- 6: Dartford between 1931 and 1947; Maidstone United between 1974 and 1980.

Run of losing a Semi-final match (not consecutive):

- 9: Sheppey United between 1893 and 1924.
- 7: Fisher Athletic / Fisher between 1985 and 2002 (current run).
- 6: Folkestone / Folkestone Town between 1937 and 1953; Ramsgate / Ramsgate Athletic between 1967 and 2023 (current run).
