= 1989–90 Carlisle United F.C. season =

Carlisle United F.C.
1989–90 season
- Manager: Clive Middlemass
- Stadium: Brunton Park
- Fourth Division: 8th
- FA Cup: Second round
- League Cup: First round
- Football League Trophy: Quarter-final

For the 1989–90 season, Carlisle United F.C. competed in Football League Division Four.

== Results & fixtures ==
=== Football League Fourth Division ===
==== League table ====
Pos	Team	Pld	W	D	L	GF	GA	GD	Pts	Promotion or relegation
6	Cambridge United	46	21	10	15	76	66	+10	73	Promoted through play-offs (Note: Cambridge United were promoted through play-offs.)
7	Chesterfield	46	19	14	13	63	50	+13	71	Participated in play-offs
8	Carlisle United	46	21	8	17	61	60	+1	71	
9	Peterborough United	46	17	17	12	59	46	+13	68	
10	Lincoln City	46	18	14	14	48	48	0	68	

==== Matches ====
Match Day	Date	Opponent	H/A	Score	Carlisle United Scorer(s)	Attendance
1	19 August	Hereford United	A	2–2		
2	26 August	Chesterfield	H	4–3		
3	2 September	Exeter City	A	0–0		
4	9 September	Grimsby Town	H	1–1		
5	15 September	Halifax Town	A	1–1		
6	23 September	Gillingham	H	3–0		
7	26 September	Cambridge United	A	2–1		
8	30 September	Colchester United	H	1–0		
9	7 October	Wrexham	H	1–1		
10	14 October	Doncaster Rovers	A	1–1		
11	17 October	Scunthorpe United	H	0–1		
12	21 October	Scarborough	A	1–2		
13	28 October	Hartlepool United	H	1–0		
18	31 October	Aldershot	A	0–1		
14	4 November	Maidstone United	H	3–2		
15	11 November	Torquay United	A	2–1		
16	25 November	Rochdale	A	2–1		
17	2 December	Peterborough United	H	0–0		
19	17 December	Stockport County	H	3–1		
20	26 December	Burnley	A	1–2		
21	30 December	Lincoln City	A	3–1		
22	1 January	York City	H	2–1		
23	6 January	Southend United	H	3–0		
24	13 January	Chesterfield	A	0–3		
25	20 January	Hereford United	H	2–1		
26	27 January	Grimsby Town	A	0–1		
27	10 February	Halifax Town	H	1–1		
28	13 February	Exeter City	H	1–0		
29	17 February	Peterborough United	A	0–3		
30	24 February	Rochdale	H	0–1		
31	27 February	Gillingham	A	1–2		
32	3 March	Southend United	A	0–2		
33	6 March	Colchester United	A	0–4		
34	17 March	Wrexham	A	0–1		
35	20 March	Doncaster Rovers	H	1–0		
36	24 March	Scunthorpe United	A	3–2		
37	31 March	Scarborough	H	3–1		
38	4 April	Cambridge United	H	3–1		
39	7 April	Hartlepool United	A	0–1		
40	10 April	Aldershot	H	1–3		
41	14 April	York City	A	1–0		
42	16 April	Burnley	H	1–1		
43	20 April	Stockport County	A	1–3		
44	24 April	Lincoln City	H	1–2		
45	28 April	Torquay United	H	2–0		
46	5 May	Maidstone United	A	2–5		

=== Football League Cup ===
Round	Date	Opponent	H/A	Score	Carlisle United Scorer(s)	Attendance
R1 L1	22 August	Halifax Town	A	1–3		
R1 L2	29 August	Halifax Town	H	1–0		

=== FA Cup ===
Round	Date	Opponent	H/A	Score	Carlisle United Scorer(s)	Attendance
R1	18 November	Wrexham	H	3–0		
R2	9 December	Wigan Athletic	A	0–2		

=== Football League Trophy ===
Round	Date	Opponent	H/A	Score	Carlisle United Scorer(s)	Attendance
GS	29 November	Scarborough	A	1–0		
GS	2 December	Scunthorpe United	H	1–1		
QF	9 January	Stockport County	H	1–2 (a.e.t.)		
