= 1991–92 Carlisle United F.C. season =

Carlisle United F.C.
1991–92 season
- Manager: Aidan McCaffery
- Stadium: Brunton Park
- Fourth Division: 23rd
- FA Cup: First round
- League Cup: First round
- Football League Trophy: First round
Home colours

For the 1991–92 season, Carlisle United F.C. competed in Football League Division Four.

== Results & fixtures ==
=== Football League Fourth Division ===
==== League table ====
Pos	Team	Pld	W	D	L	GF	GA	GD	Pts	Promotion or relegation
19	York City	42	8	16	18	42	58	−16	40	
20	Halifax Town	42	10	8	24	34	75	−41	38	
21	Doncaster Rovers	42	9	8	25	40	65	−25	35	
22	Carlisle United	42	7	13	22	41	67	−26	34	
23	Aldershot	0	0	0	0	0	0	0	0	Expelled from the Football League (Note: Aldershot expelled from the Football League but immediately refounded as Aldershot Town)

==== Matches ====
Match Day	Date	Opponent	H/A	Score	Carlisle United Scorer(s)	Attendance
1	17 August	Doncaster Rovers	A	3–0		
2	24 August	Blackpool	H	1–2		
3	31 August	Cardiff City	A	0–1		
4	3 September	Rotherham United	H	1–3		
5	6 September	Aldershot	A	2–2		
6	14 September	Lincoln City	H	0–2		
7	17 September	Mansfield Town	H	1–2		
8	21 September	Northampton Town	A	2–2		
9	28 September	Walsall	H	3–3		
10	5 October	Burnley	A	0–2		
11	12 October	Scunthorpe United	H	0–0		
12	19 October	Wrexham	A	0–3		
13	26 October	Crewe Alexandra	H	2–1		
14	2 November	Gillingham	H	0–0		
15	5 November	Barnet	A	2–4		
16	9 November	Scarborough	A	2–2		
17	23 November	Hereford United	H	1–0		
18	30 November	Maidstone United	H	3–0		
19	21 December	Blackpool	A	0–1		
20	26 December	Doncaster Rovers	H	1–0		
21	28 December	Cardiff City	H	2–2		
22	1 January	Rotherham United	A	0–1		
23	4 January	Chesterfield	A	0–0		
24	11 January	Rochdale	H	0–0		
25	18 January	York City	A	0–2		
26	25 January	Halifax Town	H	1–1		
27	7 February	Crewe Alexandra	A	1–2		
28	12 February	Maidstone United	A	1–5		
29	22 February	Rochdale	A	1–3		
30	29 February	Chesterfield	H	1–2		
31	3 March	York City	H	1–1		
32	6 March	Halifax Town	A	2–3		
33	10 March	Barnet	H	1–3		
34	14 March	Gillingham	A	2–1		
35	21 March	Scarborough	H	2–2		
36	24 March	Wrexham	H	0–1		
37	28 March	Hereford United	A	0–1		
38	1 April	Lincoln City	A	0–1		
39	11 April	Mansfield Town	A	1–2		
40	18 April	Northampton Town	H	2–1		
41	21 April	Walsall	A	0–0		
42	25 April	Burnley	H	1–1		
43	2 May	Scunthorpe United	A	0–4		

=== Football League Cup ===
Round	Date	Opponent	H/A	Score	Carlisle United Scorer(s)	Attendance
R1 L1	20 August	Rochdale	A	1–5		
R1 L2	27 August	Rochdale	H	1–1		

=== FA Cup ===
Round	Date	Opponent	H/A	Score	Carlisle United Scorer(s)	Attendance
R1	16 November	Crewe Alexandra	H	1–1		
R1 R	26 November	Crewe Alexandra	A	3–5		

=== Football League Trophy ===
Round	Date	Opponent	H/A	Score	Carlisle United Scorer(s)	Attendance
GS	22 October	York City	A	1–1		
GS	19 November	Stockport County	H	2–0		
R1	14 January	Stockport County	H	1–3		
