= 1984 UK & Ireland Greyhound Racing Year =

The 1984 UK & Ireland Greyhound Racing Year was the 59th year of greyhound racing in the United Kingdom and the 58th year of greyhound racing in Ireland.

== Roll of honour ==
Major Winners
Award	Name of Winner
1984 English Greyhound Derby	Whisper Wishes
1984 Irish Greyhound Derby	Dipmac
1984 Scottish Greyhound Derby	Not held
Greyhound Trainer of the Year	George Curtis
Greyhound of the Year	Whisper Wishes
Irish Greyhound of the Year	Morans Beef
Trainers Championship	George Curtis

== Summary ==
The year was dominated by the closure of greyhound racing's flagship stadium White City. It signified one of the lowest moments in the history of greyhound racing. The 1969 option granted to Stock Conversion and Investment Ltd for development finally became a reality. The final meeting was held on 22 September where Hastings Girl trained by Tommy Foster won the final race. The last White City Derby was won by Whisper Wishes before the event switched to Wimbledon, despite calls for it to go to Wembley. The company that introduced greyhound racing to Britain, (the Greyhound Racing Association) came under severe criticism.

The National Greyhound Racing Club (NGRC) released the annual returns, with totalisator turnover slightly down at £59,382,835 and attendances also slightly down recorded at 3,942,344 from 5191 meetings. Track tote remained at 17.5% and government tote tax at 4%.

Whisper Wishes, a black dog was voted Greyhound of the Year. after winning the Derby at White City. 1984 Greyhound of the Year Yankee Express trained by George Curtis won a third successive Scurry Gold Cup title.

== Competitions ==
The White City events switched to new tracks, in addition to receiving the Derby, Wimbledon would host the Springbok and the English Greyhound Derby Invitation. The Grand National went to Hall Green but the Longcross Cup and Wood Lane Stakes was discontinued.

== Tracks ==
Walthamstow would take over the mantle as the leading track, as shown by the final of the Grand Prix. A crowd of more than 5,000 watched Sunrise Sonny win the race. Over one million tote units were sold, the highest recorded figure since 1945.

Overshadowed by the closure of White City was the closure of three other tracks, on the 14 April both Cambridge and Perry Barr closed and Leicester ran its final meeting on 15 August after 56 years operating at Blackbird Road. It was sold by their owners Midland Sports to Barratts homes for new housing which left just Coventry operating under the name of Midland Sports. Mick Wheble who held the position of Racing Manager at Leicester and Coventry moved to take over at Oxford where Jim Layton had left for Brighton. Coventry recruited a young Racing Manager in Sean Doyle, son of trainer Paddy Doyle but Sean's career would be cut short when he died from cancer.

Independent tracks Brean Sands and Blackburn both closed but Ashington in Northumberland re-opened. Northern Sports opened their new state of the art 200 seated grandstand restaurant and leisure facilities including squash and snooker clubs at Dumpton Park, Ramsgate. Brough Park was sold to Bernard Neesham who stopped trainers from supplying greyhounds to neighbour Gosforth.

== News ==
White City trainers Tom Foster and David Kinchett joined Wimbledon and Ray Peacock went to Harringay Stadium. Frank Baldwin, Frank Melville, Graham Mann and Richard Griffin were left without a track.

A black greyhound called Scurlogue Champ, whelped in July 1982 arrived in England after initially being sold at the Shelbourne Park sales and then on to owner/trainer Ken Peckham for £1700. He had an odd running style in that he would often be outpaced early before finishing with remarkable strength. From September he broke four long-distance track records at Ipswich, Catford, Harringay and Hall Green. Another greyhound called Ballyregan Bob won his first race on 25 October 1984.

== Ireland ==
Ger McKenna won a twelfth Irish St Leger and a fifth Irish Laurels.

== Principal UK races ==
Daily Mirror Grand National, White City (April 7 500m h, £4,000)
Pos	Name of Greyhound	Trainer	SP	Time	Trap
1st	Kilcoe Foxy	George Curtis	4-5f	30.32	2
2nd	Oriental Express	Dinky Luckhurst	20-1	30.48	4
3rd	Damson Sam	Codd	9-2	30.66	1
4th	Going Solo	Terry Keith	8-1	30.69	6
5th	Spa Champ	George Curtis	9-1	30.85	3
6th	Bells Lodger	Gunner Smith	8-1	31.39	5

BBC TV Trophy, Wimbledon (Apr 11, 820m, £2,500)
Pos	Name of Greyhound	Trainer	SP	Time	Trap
1st	Weston Prelude	Arthur Hitch	4-1	52.14	2
2nd	Middleton Panel	G Middleton	7-1	52.20	3
3rd	Market Mover	J Gardner	1-1f	52.36	6
4th	Wild Surprise	Harry White	25-1	52.44	4
5th	Blue Shirt	George Curtis	7-1	00.00	5
6th	Jos Gamble	Jerry Fisher	5-1	00.00	1

Scurry Gold Cup, Slough (Jul 14, 442m, £5,000)
Pos	Name of Greyhound	Trainer	SP	Time	Trap
1st	Yankee Express	George Curtis	11-10f	27.03	6
2nd	Karinas Pal	George Curtis	3-1	27.09	2
3rd	Fifth Column	John Coleman	11-4	27.27	1
4th	Alone Sparky	John Annett	10-1	27.28	5
5th	Another Ronald	Ray Peacock	50-1	27.60	3
6th	Decoy Star	Joe Cobbold	16-1	27.88	4

St Leger, Wembley (Aug 31, 655m, £7,500)
Pos	Name of Greyhound	Trainer	SP	Time	Trap
1st	Gizzajob	John Coleman	33-1	40.28	3
2nd	Glatton Grange	Ken Linzell	6-1	40.34	4
3rd	Starters Orders	Stan Smith	6-1	40.56	1
4th	Lavey Rock	George Lang	2-1f	40.70	5
5th	Decoy Lassie	Joe Cobbold	9-4	40.73	6
6th	Wheelers Tory	Paul Wheeler	4-1	40.76	2

Gold Collar, Catford (Sep 22, 555m, £5,000)
Pos	Name of Greyhound	Trainer	SP	Time	Trap
1st	Wheelers Tory	Paul Wheeler	11-4	35.05	2
2nd	Aitch-Bee	Gunner Smith	11-8f	35.08	4
3rd	The Jolly Norman	George Curtis	5-2	35.11	1
4th	Rathkenny Lassie	Ernie Wiley	10-1	35.17	6
5th	Soda Pop	Adam Jackson	71	35.21	3
6th	Downview Choice	John Copplestone	25-1	35.43	5

Cesarewitch, Belle Vue (Sep 29, 815m, £3,000)
Pos	Name of Greyhound	Trainer	SP	Time	Trap
1st	Mobile Bank	Ernie Gaskin Sr.	7-4f	52.92	2
2nd	Star Decision	Gunner Smith	5-2	53.26	1
3rd	Decoy Lassie	Joe Cobbold	5-1	53.52	3
4th	City Hall	Eric Howarth	33-1	53.53	6
5th	Birkies Boy	Pam Heasman	14-1	53.56	5
6th	Laden Jennie	Peter Rich	7-2	53.72	4

The Grand Prix, Walthamstow (Oct 13, 640m, £5,000)
Pos	Name of Greyhound	Trainer	SP	Time	Trap
1st	Sunrise Sonny	George Curtis	25-1	40.00	4
2nd	Oakwood Lady	Ken Linzell	6-4f	40.03	6
3rd	Keem Rocket	Tony Meek	9-4	40.09	1
4th	Glatton Grange	Ken Linzell	4-1	40.11	3
5th	Lakefield Blue	Ken Linzell	25-1	40.19	2
6th	Blue Shirt	George Curtis	5-1	40.29	5

Oaks, Harringay (Oct 26, 475m, £7,500)
Pos	Name of Greyhound	Trainer	SP	Time	Trap
1st	Sandy Sally	Jack Coker	9-2	28.69	1
2nd	Black Sansisco	John Donohoe	13-8f	28.81	6
3rd	Debbies Time	Paddy Hancox	3-1	28.85	4
4th	War Baby	Mick Puzey	7-1	28.89	2
5th	Brians Yard	Philip Rees Jr.	7-1	28.99	3
6th	Isn't She Nice	John Donohoe	10-1	29.05	5

Laurels, Wimbledon (Dec 27, 460m, £5,000)
Pos	Name of Greyhound	Trainer	SP	Time	Trap
1st	Amenhotep	Linda Mullins	7-1	27.82	6
2nd	Lulus Hero	Gunner Smith	10-1	27.84	1
3rd	Ardbeg Brian	Peter Coy	4-1	27.87	2
4th	Nippy Law	Geoff De Mulder	4-1	28.05	3
5th	House of Hope	Jim Wood	11-8f	28.15	5
6th	Carry On	Norah McEllistrim	10-1	28.16	4

== Totalisator returns ==
Extended content

The totalisator returns declared to the National Greyhound Racing Club for the year 1984 are listed below.

Stadium	Turnover £
London (Walthamstow)	8,011,964
London (Wimbledon)	4,973,979
London (White City)	4,660,533
Romford	3,563,306
Brighton & Hove	3,514,439
London (Harringay)	3,444,051
London (Catford)	2,771,634
Slough	2,479,106
London (Wembley)	2,292,699
Birmingham (Hall Green)	2,093,220
Manchester (Belle Vue)	2,079,348
Edinburgh (Powderhall)	1,655,165
Crayford & Bexleyheath	1,403,277
Southend-on-Sea	1,251,068
Sheffield (Owlerton)	1,149,981

Stadium	Turnover £
Glasgow (Shawfield)	1,146,472
Wolverhampton (Monmore)	1,012,148
Ramsgate	952,992
Yarmouth	875,834
Newcastle (Brough Park)	801,265
Portsmouth	791,033
Maidstone	760,432
London (Hackney)	644,455
Milton Keynes	599,689
Bristol	561,012
Derby	537,170
Oxford	512,150
Reading	485,539
Rye House	371,713
Hull (Old Craven Park)	359,879

Stadium	Turnover £
Henlow (Bedfordshire)	350,427
Ipswich	343,895
Poole	340,247
Cradley Heath	336,798
Newcastle (Gosforth)	315,672
Nottingham	309,562
Middlesbrough	293,368
Swindon	279,908
Peterborough	245,640
Coventry	230,292
Norton Canes	208,770
Leicester	185,842
Birmingham (Perry Barr, old)	142,377
Clacton	31,159
Huntingdon	14,325
