= UKSA (maritime charity) =

British charitable organisation

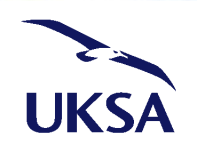
- Founded: 1987
- Founder: Noel Lister
- Type: Maritime Charity
- Location: Arctic Road, Cowes, Isle of Wight, PO31 7PQ, UK
- Region served: United Kingdom
- Formerly called: UK Sailing Academy

UKSA (previously called UK Sailing Academy), located in Cowes, is a youth charity that provides professional maritime training opportunities, youth development programs and school/ group residential trips. The charity was founded in 1987 by MFI entrepreneur Noel Lister. He purchased a Sports Council building with the intention of giving young people the opportunity to experience maritime activities. Since then, UKSA has expanded, now owning multiple buildings which are used to provide a wide range of maritime related actives, professional training and asset in support their charitable works.

UKSA currently accepts over 8000 students annually, with 80% under the age of 25 and offers more than 150 courses to choose from.

HRH The Princess Royal became Patron of UKSA in 1992. Dee Caffari (MBE), Helena Lucas (MBE), Sarah Ayton (OBE), and Shirley Robertson (OBE) are all Ambassadors for the charity.

Today UKSA's work is split into four main areas:

- Professional training courses for maritime employment.
- Non-standard education for schools and groups.
- Youth development and enrichment programmes
- Providing maritime courses for leisure application.

== Career courses ==
UKSA began teaching watersports career courses in 1990 and yachting career courses in 1993 as a way for people from all backgrounds and circumstances to be able to get the right qualifications for a career in the maritime industry.

=== Watersports ===
UKSA offers wide range of waterspouts careers course which aim to train students in various disciplines to make them an effective water-sports instructor. These include course are divided into six different programs: Waterports Instructor Training (also known as WIT), Watersports Academy, Neilson Academy, "Kickstart", Summer Instructors Training and the Instructors Development Program. These course offer slightly different pathways but all aim at providing the training and qualifications required to succeed and find a career in the watersports industry.

Yachting

The first yachting course taught at UKSA was Professional Crew Training developed by Noel Lister and his team. This developed into Professional Crew and Skipper training and then in 1998 into Caribbean Ocean Training. By 2001 the Maritime and Coastguard Agency (MCA) introduced new superyacht regulations so yachting career courses were moved in line with this.

=== Superyachting and MCA training ===
In 2001 the Maritime and Coastguard Agency (MCA) introduced new superyacht regulations so yachting career courses were moved in line with this.

By 2003 engineering courses were offered as an alternative career option. Hospitality courses also began in 2003. UKSA added MCA Deck Officer training to its spectrum of courses in 2000. This began with Class 4 training but today includes STCW Basic Training, Master 200gt through to Officer of the Watch, Chief Mate and Master 3000gt.

In 2004, UKSA worked in partnership with the MCA to develop its five-phase Superyacht Cadetship which trains individuals to Deck Officer level through training at UKSA and paid work placements in the Superyacht industry.

In 2008, The Corporation of Trinity House extended its Professional Yachtsman Bursary Scheme to individuals applying for the UKSA Cadetship. The scheme funds part of the Cadet's tuition fees along with a maintenance grant.

Today UKSA offers wide range of Superyacht Career course options and MCA training course aimed at all levels within the MCA training syllabus.

== Schools and groups ==
Schools and youth groups from across the UK visit UKSA for day or residential trips throughout the year. UKSA offer groups to tailor make their trips to meet the needs and demands set out by the groups. Trips focus providing children and adults alike from all backgrounds with new water related experiences, with many gaining basic qualifications whilst taking part in these programs.

In 2019 8000+ individuals from schools and youth groups spent time at UKSA.

== Leisure courses ==
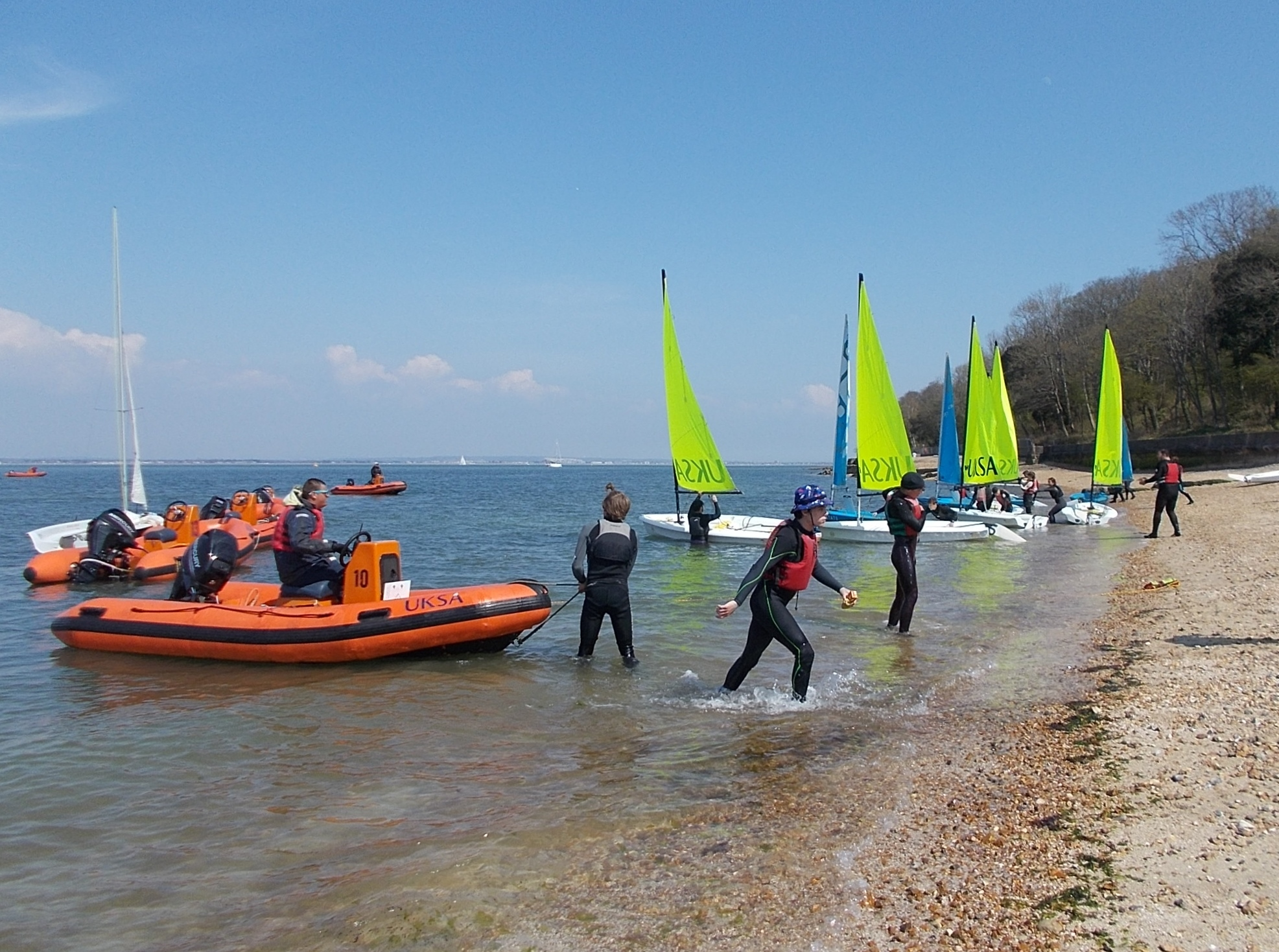
Dinghy sailing class at East Cowes, Isle of Wight

UKSA offers a wide range of paid maritime leisure courses ranging from dingy sailing and powerboating to the full RYA Yachtmaster syllabus. UKSA accepted over 953 leisure course students in 2019 with an age range of 6-77.

== Disability ==
UKSA works with a number of specialist schools, groups and individuals to assist them in being able to participate in watersports and sailing activities.

In 2010 278 beneficiaries with disabilities spent time at UKSA on day or residential trips.

== Sporting performance ==
UKSA provides the opportunity for young people to sail competitively.

=== GBR Yacht Racing Academy (GBR YRA) ===
The GBR YRA was created in 2006 by Bear of Britain owner Kit Hobday and Chernikeeff 2 owner Peter Harrison in association with UKSA.

=== British Keelboat Academy ===
In 2009 GBR YRA joined forces with the Royal Yachting Association (RYA) to form the British Keelboat Academy (BKA). The BKA is aimed at 18- to 24-year-old with the squad divided in ‘Development’ and ‘National’. The Development squad train and race on UKSA's fleet of J80s. Until 2010 the National squad trained and raced on the RYA's John Merricks II. In 2011 Skype founder Niklas Zennström loaned Farr 45 Kólga from his Rán fleet to the BKA. The BKA have also been loaned J/109 Yeoman of Wight by David Aisher, Rear Commodore Yachting of the Royal Yacht Squadron.

== Gipsy Moth IV ==
In 2004, UKSA bought Gipsy Moth IV for £1. Following a campaign to restore her, the boat was ready to sail again in 2005. From 2005 to 2007, Gipsy Moth IV completed a second circumnavigation. Instead of breaking records like Sir Francis Chichester, this global voyage had disadvantaged young people on board as part of the crew.

In November 2010, Gipsy Moth IV was bought by new owners Rob Thompson and Eileen Skinner. The boat is managed by UKSA and alongside attending events throughout the year, will be used by UKSA to promote their charitable activities.

=== Apprenticeship ===
Using funding from the government's Future Jobs Fund, two cohorts of 18- to 24-year-olds that had been labelled as NEET – not in employment, education or training – began training for watersports qualifications at UKSA in April and October 2010. The training was designed to give each young person a host of transferable skills to utilise in the future.

=== Island youth partnership ===
In partnership with the Isle of Wight Community Partnership, the Hampshire and Isle of Wight Constabulary, Vestas Technology UK and Employee Volunteering, UKSA launched a pilot project for young people on the Isle of Wight in spring and summer of 2010.

The young people on the project took part in structured sailing and watersports activities alongside personal mentoring to help them develop essential skill sets and confidence to help them engage with local clubs and services.

This has evolved into a range of youth development programmes which all involve on-the-water activities as the catalyst for positive change, giving young people the chance to get their lives back on track. People arrive at UKSA from all walks of life, but for NEETs (Not in Education, Employment or Training), young offenders, or those who are failing to engage at school, being immersed in the positive environment of UKSA can be life-changing. Generally the courses involve a team-building residential, watersports and sailing, community work, work experience and help to complete a professional CV.

== About UKSA ==
The charity's founder, Noel Lister, was born in 1927. After completing his education he went straight into a six-year signing with the Army, where his entrepreneurial spirit was already apparent on a troop ship to Egypt towards the end of WWII when he traded cigarettes and did a “tea round” selling tea to other soldiers too lazy to make their own in the heat.

Back on home soil, he entered the world of retail by working in a furniture store. He was such a strong character the shop owner said he would either end up in prison or turn up one day in a Rolls-Royce. Noel knew which path to take, left the business, and four years later, sure enough, he pulled up in his Roller.

He built up his own furniture business, popularising the concept of a dining room suite by selling tables with matching chairs, and introducing bunk beds to the family home (things that hadn't been widely done before).

He often tried out different tactics, and he eventually founded the furniture retailer MFI. It used the concept of shed retailing and out-of-town shopping while using flat pack self-assembly furniture. MFI also hired out roof racks intending to appeal more to its customers.

Noel campaigned his racing yachts over many years during the time he ran MFI and accumulated a large amount of silverware against top national and international competition in RORC races, Fastnet etc.

After a career as a retail genius he sold MFI for a large sum of money at the age of 58 and further indulged his passion for sailing, spending a good decade or so sailing around the world with his wife Sylvia on their 103 ft boat, Whirlwind XII. His favorite destination was Alaska where he could enjoy being chased by grizzlies.

While sailing the world he had time to reflect on his wonderful life — and he knew he wanted to give something back. Sylvia explained: “He would say, “I can’t have all this money and not let children enjoy the sea as much as we do.” He knew he wanted to find a way of giving children confidence, and he felt a great way to do this would be to give them the opportunity to get out onto the water. His whole aim was to give disabled or disadvantaged children the chance to go sailing, and this idea just seemed to grow.”

Mike Koppstein was Noel’s yacht captain, so he was with the businessman right at the beginning of UKSA, when the idea of establishing a sailing charity first came about.

Mike explained: “Noel always had the idea of making sailing accessible to under-privileged children. It came through his experience of the teamwork of sailing and he felt strongly that it was something everyone should be able to experience.

Mike explained, “Noel was quite a shy unassuming person, and sailing made him feel comfortable. He understood his own limitations in his shyness and saw how the sailing environment made him more sociable. It bought the gamesmanship and confidence out of him."

"In founding UKSA, his priority was to make an initial charitable donation but then to have it run as a business. He sought to maximize the use of funds while generating income – so it was not solely about giving money, but also about ensuring UKSA operated efficiently."

Noel had raced in Cowes for years and when the opportunity arose to buy a waterfront centre from the Sports Council in October 1987 he knew it would be perfect.

He invested £4 million in the Lister Charitable Trust to start the place afresh, and he applied his entrepreneurial principles to setting up the charity.

In the early days there were 60 beds, and plenty of dinghies but no yachts, but it was busy with 1,500 children a year taking part in activities. The initial goal was to increase this operation by buying more kit to enable more schools to come along.

With the growth in leisure holidays too, it became apparent that there were job opportunities for young people within the watersports industry, so UKSA looked into providing instructor training courses.

The courses extended the operational arm of the charity, brought in income and helped young people set off on careers. It also kept the centre busy all year round, instead of closing for winter like it did in the early days.

Later, the yacht training courses were established in response to a gap in the market and a need, all around the world, for experienced crew for the growing superyacht industry.

Mike explained: “I came up with the idea of setting up crew training, because as far as we knew there was nothing else offering that. To the best of our knowledge we were very much the first. Before that, there were purely academic captains’ courses, nothing blending the theory with the practical. If there were others, they were not formalised as ours was. The curriculum was wisely shaped in detail by Ben Cussons and attendance subsequently grew - and the rest is modern history.”

Over the years, UKSA expanded by buying yachts, purchasing the hotel over the road (now Victory) to accommodate career students, building a swimming pool in 1993 and opening the Lister House accommodation block in 2003. Princess Royal became patron in 1992 — the Royal seal of approval.

In recent years, UKSA has broadened its focus beyond maritime activities and training to incorporate personal development within its programmes. This includes providing training, mentoring, and support intended to help participants develop skills and pursue education or career opportunities. As a youth education and maritime training charity, UKSA continues to deliver programmes to a diverse range of individuals.

Sylvia said: “The whole thing makes us both very proud. I think it is brilliant as it gives children a chance in life. UKSA was Noel’s No.1 passion, definitely.”

Noel was awarded the Lifetime Achievement Award at the World Superyacht Awards in 2010 – the first time a still-living yachtsman has been chosen. Noel refused to go to the ceremony. Instead, his family did, and collected the award on his behalf.

UKSA's founder Noel Lister died in 2015.
