= 1984 Irish Greyhound Derby =

1984 edition of the Irish Greyhound Derby

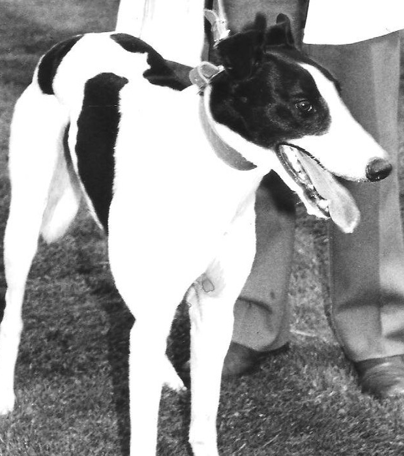
- Dipmac
- Venue: Shelbourne Park
- Location: Dublin
- End date: 15 September
- Total prize money: £25,000 (winner)

The 1984 Irish Greyhound Derby took place during August and September with the final being held at Shelbourne Park in Dublin on 15 September 1984.

The winner Dipmac won £25,000 and was trained by Seamus Graham, owned by Noel Ryan & Paschal Taggart and bred by Seamus Graham. The competition was sponsored by Carrolls.

== Final result ==
At Shelbourne, 15 September (over 525 yards):

Position	Winner	Breeding	Trap	SP	Time	Trainer
1st	Dipmac	Sand Man - Kind of Luxury	5	5-1	29.15	Seamus Graham
2nd	Glencorbry Celt	Brilliant Chimes - Glencorbry Og	1	7-2	29.31	Jerry Melia
3rd	Count Five	Sail On II - All Jam	6	6-4f	29.35	Ger McKenna
4th	Spartacus	Knockrour Slave - I'm A Star	4	6-1	29.41	Matt O'Donnell
5th	Tubbercurry Lad	Liberty Lad - Tubbercurry Nancy	2	7-1	29.81	Charlie Faul
6th	Curryhills Fox	Bold Work - Lemon Soda	3	7-1	29.97	Francie Murray

=== Distances ===
2, ½, ¾, 5, 2 (lengths)

== Competition Report ==
The Irish Derby was moved to a later slot in the year and was scheduled to be run in September. The leading contenders going into the event were two 1984 English Greyhound Derby finalists Morans Beef and Spartacus; the latter had since won the Easter Cup. Dipmac had recovered from an injury to take part in the event and Ger McKenna’s team included the returning Count Five and Brideview Sailor. The ante-post favourite was Rugged Mick.

Morans Beef set the best first round time, a fast 28.99 beating Dipmac into second place, the latter finished sore on the wrist, the same wrist injury that had ended his English Derby attempt. Rugged Mick was a shock elimination.

Bad weather washed out the first attempt at a second round before a second attempt went ahead on very heavy going. The going contributed to the elimination of Brideview Sailor, Morans Beef, Manorville Sand, Glenbrien Champ and Powerstown Jet. Glencorbry Celt was fastest in 29.09.

The quarter finals took place in better conditions resulting in wins for Tubbercurry Lad, Dipmac, Jack the Hiker and Dark Captain. In the semi-finals Spartacus defeated Tubbercurry Lad and Curryhills Fox in 29.06, before Count Five claimed the second semi final heat, with victory in a very fast 28.95; Dipmac and Glencorby Celt dead heated for second place to claim the final two places.

Dipmac had undergone veterinary treatment throughout the competition as he struggled with his wrist injury, leading greyhound veterinary surgeon Plunkett Devlin assisted his owners Paschal Taggart and Noel Ryan and trainer Seamus Graham in getting the greyhound to the final. When the traps opened for the final Dipmac produced a turn of early pace that was too much for Count Five and Spartacus. Some trouble behind left Dipmac clear with Count Five just behind but he held on with the strong finishing Glencorby Celt running on for second place. losing finalist Curryhills Fox was owned by Charlie McCreevy.

== See also ==
- 1984 UK & Ireland Greyhound Racing Year
