= Welling United F.C. =

English football club in London

Welling United
- Full name: Welling United Football Club
- Nickname: The Wings
- Founded: 1963; 63 years ago
- Ground: Park View Road, Welling
- Capacity: 4,000 (1,000 seated)
- Owner: Howard Prosser Abdul Rashidi
- Chairman: Howard Prosser
- Manager: Ryan Maxwell
- League: Isthmian League Premier Division
- 2025–26: Isthmian League Premier Division, 15th of 22
- Website: wellingunited.com
Home colours	Away colours

Welling United Football Club is a semi-professional association football club, based in Welling in the London Borough of Bexley, England. The most prominent aspect of the club is its men's first team, who play in the Isthmian League Premier Division, the seventh level of the English football league system.

== History ==
=== Formation and early years (1963–1975) ===
Welling United Football Club was founded in 1963 by former professional footballer Syd Hobbins. It began as an U15 youth team, playing in the Eltham & District Sunday League on a park pitch from 1963–64 to 1970–71. From 1971–72 to 1974–75, they played in the Metropolitan-London League Intermediate/Reserves Division at Butterfly Lane, Eltham.

=== London Spartan, Athenian and Southern Leagues (1975–1986) ===
In 1975–76, they played in the London Spartan League Reserve Division One. They gained senior status in the London Spartan League in 1976, while playing at Butterfly Lane. Welling finished sixth in the London Spartan League Division 2 in 1976–77 and was promoted to the Premier Division. In 1977, Welling moved to the Park View Road ground, which had previously belonged to the by-that-time-defunct Bexley United. The club joined the Athenian League in 1978, and in 1981 progressed to the Southern Football League Southern Division.

After just one season at this level the club found itself in the Southern League Premier Division after the league was re-organised. In 1985–86, they won the league title by 23 points and were promoted to the Football Conference.

=== Football Conference (1986–2000) ===
Although the team struggled in the Conference, only twice finishing above 11th place in 14 seasons, they did enjoy cup success during this period, qualifying for the first round proper of the FA Cup in the six successive seasons between 1986 and 1992. The first of these was in the 1986–87 season, where they were drawn against Maidstone United, playing to a 1–1 draw and a 4–1 defeat in the first-round replay. The next season, they defeated Carshalton Athletic 3–2 at home to reach the second round proper, then losing to Bath City 1–0 at Park View Road. In 1988–89, Welling United made their only third-round proper appearance to date, losing 1–0 at Park View Road to Blackburn Rovers. 1989-90 was another significant campaign for Welling, as they knocked out Kent's only Football League side, Gillingham, who competed in the Football League Fourth Division, the fourth tier of English football at the time. This match holds the record for the club's highest attendance at a home game.

During this period, the club also had success in local cups, winning the Kent Senior Cup in the 1985–86 and 1998–99 seasons, as well as the London Senior Cup in the 1989–89 season, and the London Challenge Cup in the 1991–92 season.

Terry Robbins joined the club in 1986, coinciding with the beginning of the team's period of FA Cup success. He was top league scorer for the club between 1986 and 1994, and was the leading scorer for the Football Conference league in the 1991–1992 season, with 29 league goals.

The club was relegated in 1999–2000 and returned to the Southern League Premier Division.

=== Conference South (2003–2010) ===
In the 2003–04 season, under the management of former England World Cup player Paul Parker, the Wings finished in the top half of the Southern League Premier Division and was therefore able to claim a place in the newly formed Conference South. In that season, Parker left the club by mutual consent.

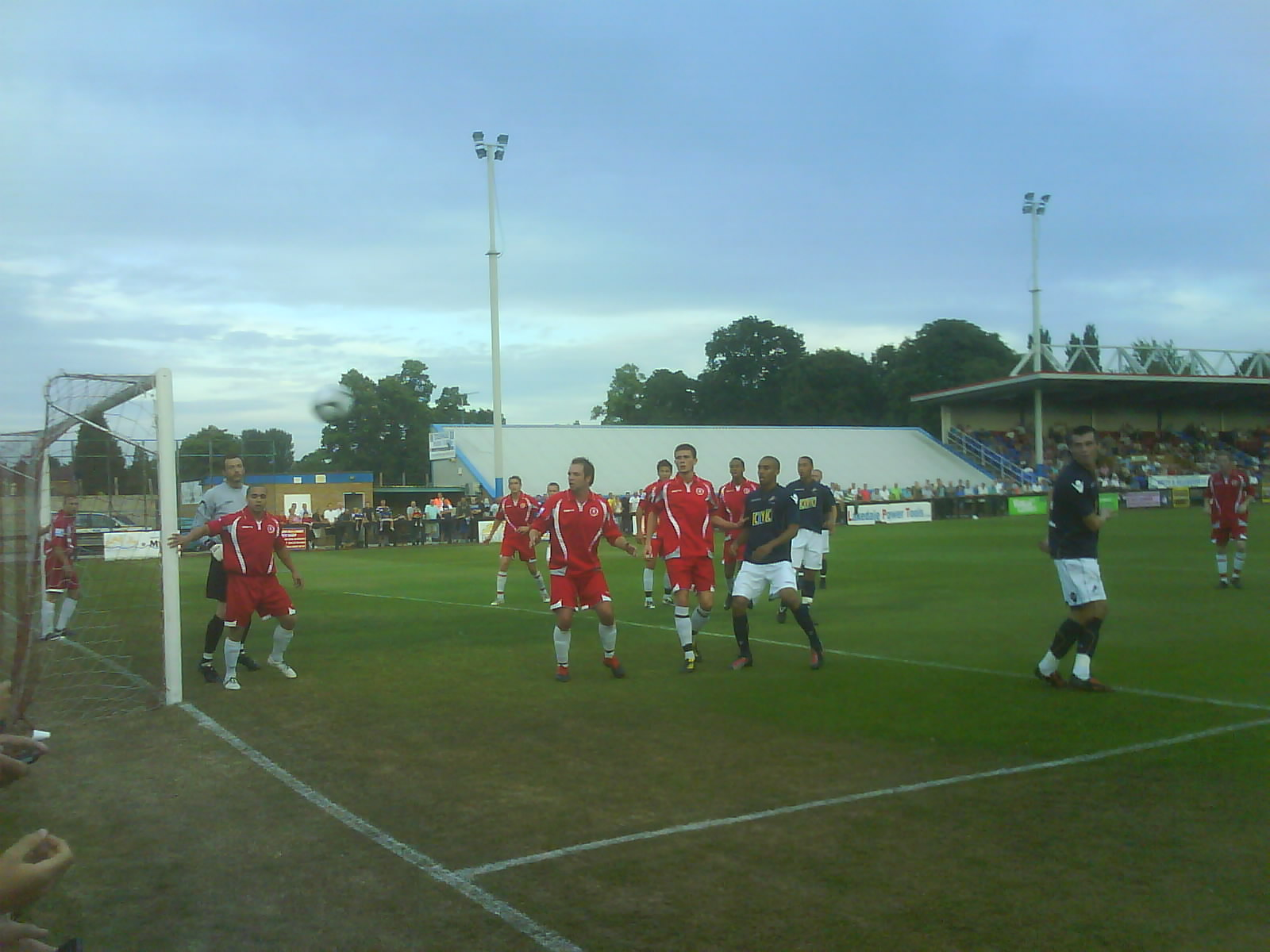
Welling playing Millwall in a pre-season friendly at Park View Road.

Former Coventry City and Republic of Ireland player Liam Daish took charge of the team on a caretaker basis before the permanent position was handed to former Norwich City and Gillingham defender Adrian Pennock, who narrowly missed out on taking the club into the promotion play-offs. Pennock left the club at the end of the 2006–07 season. His last game managing the Wings finished in a 1–1 draw at home to Hayes. Pennock joined Stoke City in a coaching position under his former Gillingham manager, Tony Pulis.

On 16 May 2007, Welling United appointed Neil Smith as the new first team manager. However, after only seven months in charge Smith parted company with the club on 7 January 2008. It was mutually agreed between the club and Smith that his reign as Wings boss would end.

Andy Ford was appointed the new manager of the Wings on 31 January 2008. Despite losing 6–2 to Cambridge City in his first game in charge, Ford guided the Wings to safety and they eventually finished 16th. Welling finished 7th in the Conference South in 2008/09 under the guidance of Ford. After a poor start to the 2009–10 season Ford resigned, stating he didn't think he could achieve what he wanted on the current budget. Jamie Day was announced as the new player/manager in November 2009.

=== Debt and misconduct (2010–2011) ===
On 12 August 2010, the club was served with a winding-up petition by HM Revenue and Customs (HMRC), due for a hearing later that month. The club was given 14 weeks to pay the outstanding debt to the HMRC. £60,000 was raised by the club and its supporters to clear all debts. During this period, in a Football Conference Hearing on 16 September 2010, Welling United admitted to a misconduct charge in connection with the outstanding HMRC debt. This resulted in an immediate deduction of 5 points and a suspended £5,000 fine.

Despite this embargo and point deduction, the team missed out on a play-off place by only one point, finishing in 6th place.

=== Promotion and relegation (2011–2019) ===
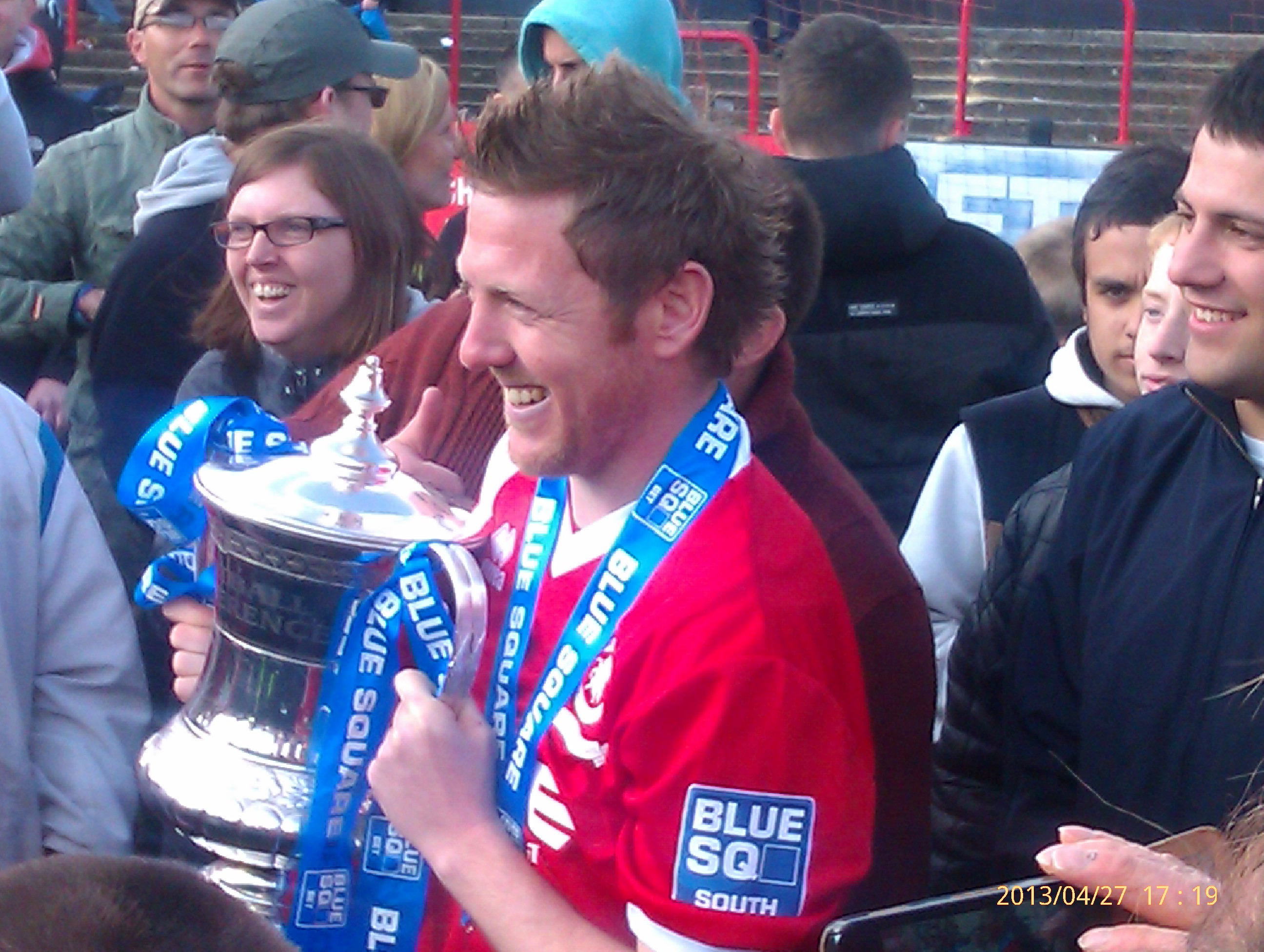
Former player manager Jamie Day with the Conference South trophy after winning the title in 2013.

The 2011–12 season ended with Welling in 3rd place and after defeating Sutton United 2–1 on aggregate in the play-off semi-finals they narrowly missed promotion in the final, being defeated 0–1 by Dartford at Princes Park.

Welling made a return to the top level of non-league football the following season after clinching the Conference South title, 13 years after they last played at the fifth tier of English football. Between 3 November and 5 February, Welling also broke the league's record for consecutive wins, with 12 in a row.

In December 2014 Jamie Day left Welling by mutual consent. He was replaced by Jake Gallagher and Jamie Turner as caretakers, but on 21 December it was announced that Jody Brown of Grays Athletic would become manager. On 3 March 2015, Jody Brown was relieved of his duties after just one point in his first nine games. Right back player Loui Fazakerley was put in charge for "the foreseeable future".

Welling's first televised home match was played on 8 March 2015, being played live on BT Sport, and ended in a 1–0 loss to Altrincham.

Following an impressive run of results, Fazakerley steered the team out of the relegation zone and to 20th place, above Alfreton Town on goal difference. Fazakerley was appointed as manager on a full-time basis the same week.

On 25 January 2016 Loui Fazakerley was sacked after 10 months in charge, with the club in the National League relegation zone and was replaced with former first team coach Dean Frost, along with and Barry Ashby as assistant manager. Jamie Turner also came back as goalkeeping coach. Frost's first match in charge was away against FC Halifax Town and finished 1–1, Welling's first goal and point at The Shay. Frost left the post with 6 matches remaining in the 2015–16 season with the club bottom of the league after a 4–0 defeat to Chester, leading to Welling's relegation to National League South, formerly known as Conference South.

Mark Goldberg was appointed manager for the coming season along with Damian Mathew as his assistant. After a poor start to the season Golberg gave more control to Mathew but that proved short lived as Mathew left the club in the wake of a capitulation from 2–0 at home to Hemel Hempstead Town, losing the match 3–2. Former manager Jamie Day returned to the club as assistant to Goldberg but results still did not improve. Day was appointed manager, which culminated in a run that saw Day awarded National League South Manager of the Month, December 2016, and talisman Adam Coombes named player for the month. Day was being assisted by Adrian Pennock, acting as football consultant. In January 2017, more upheaval was to follow when Pennock left for Gillingham, as manager, taking Day with him as assistant. Coach, Harry Wheeler and Tristan Lewis were drafted in to cover in the short term. With the 2016–17 season nearing close, former Charlton Athletic assistant manager Alex Dyer was appointed manager in March 2017. Assisted by Tristan Lewis, Dyer guided Welling for the remainder of the season, and finished the 2016–17 campaign with a 2–0 loss to Dover Athletic in the Kent Senior Cup final. In May 2017, Jamie Coyle became Welling United manager, with Tristan Lewis appointed to Director of Football. In February 2018 it was announced that Coyle had signed a contract extension to manage the Wings for the 2018–19 season. With the season ended three days earlier, and the club missing out on a play-off berth, it was announced on 1 May 2018 that Coyle had stepped down from his role as first-team manager. On 3 May 2018, Director of Football, Tristan Lewis also left for pastures new, with the club singling out his work; in establishing their academy, and co-managing the team alongside Mark Goldberg, Harry Wheeler, Alex Dyer and Jamie Coyle, for praise.

Steve King was next to be appointed manager after he joined from recently relegated Whitehawk at the end of May. His first season with the Wings finished in 3rd place and top of the home form table. The team's position on the league table led to qualification for the playoffs for only the second time in its history. In the semi-final at Park View Road, Welling defeated Chelmsford City 3-2 courtesy of a 96th-minute penalty by Brendan Kiernan. The playoff final was won by Woking. The hosts won the game 1–0 after Armani Little scored a free-kick just before half-time. This was King's final game in charge as manager as he was replaced in June 2019 by Mark Goldberg, who returned for his second term as manager.

=== COVID-19 pandemic (2019–2021) ===
Bradley Quinton became the club's new manager in January 2020. Quinton oversaw an immediate improvement before the 2019–2020 season was suspended on 16 March 2020 due to the COVID-19 pandemic, with the club in mid-table. On 31 March 2020, this suspension was extended indefinitely. Clubs would then vote to end the season on 22 April.

Uncertainty before the 2020–21 season resulted in another squad overhaul. After a single win from 11 games, Quinton was sacked by the club, and subsequently replaced by manager Steve Lovell. The season was again interrupted by COVID-19, being declared null and void on 18 February 2021, and a National League restructure resulted in only the bottom team being relegated the following season.

=== Recent history (2021–present) ===
Lovell left his position as manager after an unsuccessful start, being replaced in September 2021 by Peter Taylor, who stayed until March 2022, when Warren Feeney was appointed manager.

Goldberg's direct ownership finished at the end of that season with Howard Prosser and Jerry Dolke taking majority ownership of the club. Feeney was permanently appointed by the new board to build a more competitive squad for 2022–23, however, despite generous backing from the club, he was only able to achieve a bottom-half finish. Unpopular with supporters, he left the club in June 2023 to take up the vacant managerial post at Glentoran in his native Northern Ireland. Feeney's replacement was announced as former Eastbourne Borough manager Danny Bloor. With the club third from bottom of the National League South, Bloor was sacked on 28 January 2024 and was replaced by Rod Stringer, the Brentwood Town manager, on 29 January 2024. Despite leading the club to survival from relegation in the 2023–24 season, Stringer resigned in March 2025 following a run of poor results, with Brian Statham becoming Caretaker Manager for the rest of the season. However, the 2024–25 season saw the club relegated to the Isthmian League Premier Division. On 3 May 2025, the club appointed Lee Martin as the new manager. On 2 October 2025, Martin was sacked after a poor start to the 2025–26 Isthmian League season, with former Dulwich Hamlet and Hastings United manager Paul Barnes taking charge on an interim basis. On 4 October 2025, former manager Rod Stringer returned to the club as Interim Manager.

== Ground ==
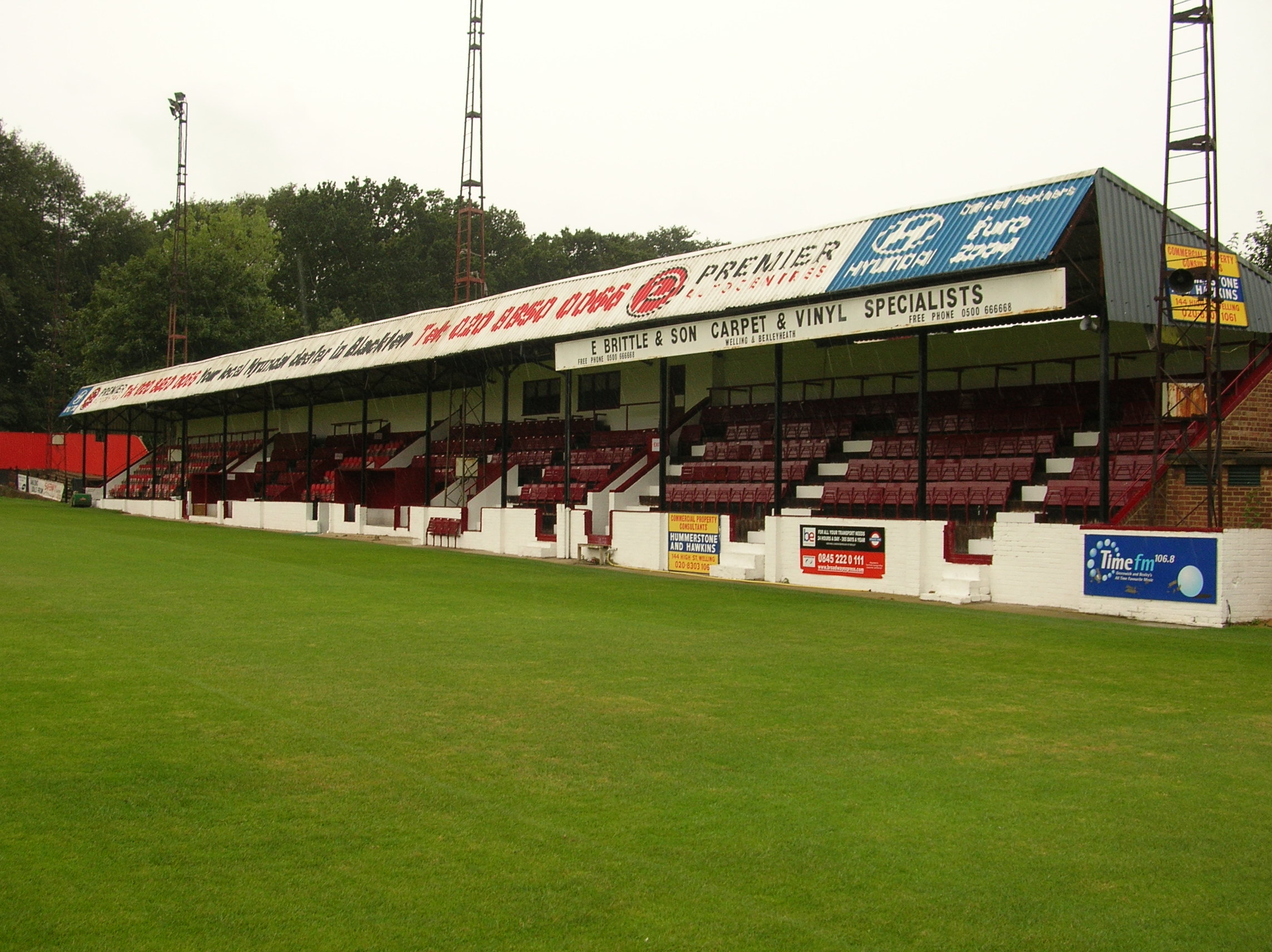
Park View Road, which has been Welling United's home ground since 1977.

Welling United play their home matches at Park View Road, Welling. This ground has been their home since 1977 when they took over the ground which had been vacated by the defunct Bexley United. Prior to that date the club had played at a community sports ground in Butterfly Lane, Eltham. Having been unoccupied for some time, the new ground was almost derelict.

Erith & Belvedere have been ground sharing since the 1999 season. Improvements were made to the Park View Road ground in 2004, which included a new covered stand.

As a result of severe storms and gale-force winds in December 2006, the floodlights at Park View Road were damaged. Due to safety reasons all the floodlight pylons on the Welling side of the ground were removed. The floodlights were put in place during the month of June 2007 and are fully functional, one pylon positioned in each corner.

During the 2013–14 season, Park View Road had to be changed to keep Welling United in the Conference Premier in the 2014–15 season. These all happened between the months of February and March.

In the close season of 2015–16 both Welling United bars, the boardroom and parking area at Park View Road underwent renovations. In particular the hospitality areas at the ground were fully refitted to cater for match-days, and non-football related events and private bookings.

== Players ==
=== Current squad ===
As of 1 July 2025

Note: Flags indicate national team as defined under FIFA eligibility rules; some limited exceptions apply. Players may hold more than one non-FIFA nationality.

No.	Pos.	Nation	Player
1	GK	ENG	Freddie Norman
4	DF	ENG	Lekan Majoyegbe
5	DF	ENG	Scott Simmons
10	MF	ENG	John Ufuah
21	MF	ENG	Jack Paxman
40	DF	ENG	Jonah Walker

No.	Pos.	Nation	Player
45	DF	POR	Chris Arthur
46	DF	ENG	Junio Savane
48	DF	NGA	Olumide Oluwatimilehin
—	MF	ENG	Jack Leahy
—	MF	ENG	Henry Sinai
—	FW	ENG	Ruben Shakpoke

=== Out on loan ===
Note: Flags indicate national team as defined under FIFA eligibility rules; some limited exceptions apply. Players may hold more than one non-FIFA nationality.

No. / Pos. / Nation / Player	No. / Pos. / Nation / Player

== Club officials ==
As of 27 June 2023

- Chairman: Howard Prosser
- WUSA Chairman: Matt Mein

== First-team staff ==
As of 17 November 2025

Role	Name
Manager	Ryan Maxwell
Assistant manager	Billy McMahon
First-team coach	
Sports Scientist	Glen Warwick
First Team Scout	Richard Piggford

== Recent seasons ==
Year	League	Level	Pld	W	D	L	GF	GA	GD	Pts	Position	Leading league scorer	Goals	FA Cup	FA Trophy	Average attendance
2015–16	Conference Premier	5	46	8	11	27	35	73	−38	35	24th of 24; Relegated	Sahr Kabba	6	R1	R1	682
2016–17	National League South	6	42	12	7	23	64	69	−5	43	16th of 22	Adam Coombes	20	QR4	R3	539
2017–18	National League South	6	42	17	10	15	68	59	+9	61	10th of 22	Bradley Goldberg	10	QR2	QR3	533
2018–19	National League South	6	42	23	7	12	70	47	+23	76	3rd of 22; Lost in play-off final	Brendan Kiernan	14	QR4	QR3	740
2019–20	National League South	6	34	12	6	16	38	46	-8	42 (1.24 PPG)	12th of 22; Season abandoned	Anthony Cook	8	QR4	R1	624
2020–21	National League South	6	14	2	6	6	18	20	-2	12	21st of 21; Season declared null and void	Dipo Akinyemi	6	QR2	R2	611*
2021–22	National League South	6	40	10	8	22	46	87	-41	38	20th of 21	Dipo Akinyemi	18	QR2	R2	584
2022–23	National League South	6	46	15	14	17	57	63	-6	58**	16th of 24	Ade Azeez	15	QR4	R3	792
2023–24	National League South	6	46	12	18	16	56	71	-15	54	17th of 24	Tristan Abrahams / Kain Adom	7	QR4	R5	723
2024–25	National League South	6	46	10	8	28	47	91	-44	38	22nd of 24; Relegated	Gene Kennedy	8	QR2	R2	688

* – average of games where crowds were permitted
** – deducted 1 point for fielding an ineligible player

== Recent managers ==
Dates	Name	Notes
1995 – July 2000	(England) Kevin Hales	
July 2000 – May 2002	(England) Tony Reynolds	
June 2002 – May 2003	(England) Bill Williams	
May 2003 – December 2004	(England) Paul Parker	
December 2004 – January 2005	(England) Liam Daish	Caretaker manager
January 2005 – May 2007	(England) Adrian Pennock	
May 2007 – January 2008	(England) Neil Smith	
January 2008	(England) Chris Moore (England) Richard Carpenter	Joint caretaker managers
January 2008 – October 2009	(England) Andy Ford	
October 2009 – November 2009	(England) Lee Protheroe	Caretaker manager
November 2009 – December 2014	(England) Jamie Day	Player-manager
December 2014	(England) Jamie Turner (England) Jake Gallagher	Joint caretaker managers
December 2014 – March 2015	(England) Jody Brown	
March 2015 – January 2016	(England) Loui Fazakerley	Player-manager. Caretaker manager until 22 April 2015
January 2016 – April 2016	(England) Dean Frost	
April 2016 – November 2016	(England) Mark Goldberg	
November 2016 – January 2017	(England) Jamie Day	
January 2017 – April 2017	(England) Harry Wheeler (England) Tristan Lewis	Joint caretaker managers
April 2017 – May 2017	(England) Alex Dyer	Caretaker manager
May 2017 – May 2018	(England) Jamie Coyle	Player-manager
May 2018 – June 2019	(England) Steve King	
June 2019 – January 2020	(England) Mark Goldberg	
January 2020 – January 2021	(England) Bradley Quinton	
January 2021 – September 2021	(Wales) Steve Lovell	
September 2021 – March 2022	(England) Peter Taylor	
March 2022 – June 2023	(Northern Ireland) Warren Feeney	
June 2023 – January 2024	(England) Danny Bloor	
January 2024 – March 2025	(England) Rod Stringer	
March 2025 – May 2025	(England) Brian Statham	Interim manager
May 2025 – October 2025	(England) Lee Martin	
October 2025 – November 2025	(England) Rod Stringer	Interim manager
November 2025 – present	(Republic of Ireland) Ryan Maxwell	

== Club records ==
- Highest league position:
  - 6th in the Conference National: 1989–90
- Highest attendance:
  - 4,100 v Gillingham FA Cup first round, 22 November 1989
- FA Cup best performance
  - Third round: 1988–89
- FA Trophy best performance
  - Quarter-finals: 1988–89, 2006–07
- FA Vase best performance
  - Third round: 1979–80

== Honours ==
Welling United's first trophies were in the 1985–86 season, where they won both the Kent Senior Cup and the Southern League, earning themselves a promotion to the Conference South. Subsequent seasons saw them winning the London Senior Cup in the 1989–90 season and the London Challenge Cup in the 1991–92 season, as well as winning the Kent Senior Cup again in the 1998–99 season.

After the turn of the millennium, they won the Conference South in the 2012–13 season, as well as once again winning the Kent and London Senior Cups in the 2008–09 and 2018–19 seasons respectively. They won the Kent Senior Cup for a fourth time in 2025, defeating Ebbsfleet United 1–0 in the final.

League

- Conference South (level 6)
  - Champions: 2012–13
- Southern League Premier Division
  - Champions: 1985–86

Cup

- Kent Senior Cup
  - Winners: 1985–86, 1998–99, 2008–09, 2024–25
- London Senior Cup
  - Winners: 1989–90, 2018–19
- London Challenge Cup
  - Winners: 1991–92
