= Ryan Maxwell =

Northern Irish footballer (born 1984)

Personal information
- Date of birth: 18 May 1984 (age 42)
- Place of birth: Belfast, Northern Ireland
- Position: Midfielder

Team information
- Current team: Welling United (manager)

Youth career
- Chelsea
- Crystal Palace
- 2001–2002: Reading

Senior career*
Years	Team	Apps	(Gls)
2002–2003	Grays Athletic	11	(0)
2003	Purfleet	13	(0)
2003	Hamilton Academical	2	(0)
2004–2005	Raith Rovers	5	(0)
2005	Dagenham & Redbridge	0	(0)
2005	Redbridge	6	(0)
2005	Gravesend & Northfleet	0	(0)
2005	→ Basingstoke Town (loan)	2	(0)
2005	Margate	2	(0)
2005–2006	Bishop's Stortford		
2006	Llanelli	0	(0)
2006–2007	Tonbridge Angels	22	(1)
2007	Braintree Town	3	(0)
2007	Billericay Town	2	(0)
2007–2008	Welling United		
2008	Wivenhoe Town	2	(0)
2008	Boreham Wood	6	(0)
2008–2009	Larne		
2009	Stansted		
2009	St Albans City	1	(0)
2010	Harlow Town	10	(0)
2010–2011	Waltham Abbey	28	(1)
2011–2012	Harlow Town	21	(0)
2012–2013	Whyteleafe	31	(5)
2013–2014	Grays Athletic	3	(0)
2014	Heybridge Swifts		
2014	AFC Sudbury		
2014–2015	Witham Town	0	(0)
2015	Heybridge Swifts	0	(0)
2015	Ware	11	(0)
2015–2016	Heybridge Swifts		
2016–2017	Waltham Forest		
2017	Ware	2	(0)
2018–2020	Walthamstow		

International career
- Northern Ireland U16
- Northern Ireland U21

Managerial career
- 2018–2020: Walthamstow (player-manager)
- 2020–2022: Braintree Town
- 2023–2025: Sittingbourne
- 2025–: Welling United
- * Club domestic league appearances and goals

Ryan Maxwell (born 18 May 1984) is a Northern Irish football manager and former semi-professional footballer, who currently manages Welling United.

Maxwell previously played in the Scottish Football League for Hamilton Academical and Raith Rovers as well as a number of non-League football teams in England. He has also represented the Northern Ireland national under-21 football team.

== Club career ==
Maxwell began his career as a youth player at Chelsea before moving onto Crystal Palace and Reading in 1999. He went on to join Isthmian League Premier Division club Grays Athletic in 2002.

In 2003, he joined Scottish club Hamilton Academical making three appearances, two in the Scottish Second Division and one in the Scottish League Cup. The following season, 2004–05, he joined Raith Rovers in the Scottish First Division. He was released by mutual consent in January 2005 by manager Gordon Dalziel.

Following his release from Raith, Maxwell subsequently joined Conference National club Dagenham & Redbridge. Failing to make an appearance for the Daggers, he went on to join Redbridge, and then joined Conference South outfit Basingstoke Town in August 2005. However, he made just two league appearances in August before he departed, and eventually joined Margate in October.

In January 2006, Maxwell joined Bishop's Stortford on loan from Gravesend & Northfleet, making his début in the 3–1 away loss against Weymouth on 5 January. He signed for Welsh Premier League club Llanelli in the close season of 2006, featuring in their UEFA Cup qualifying ties. In the first leg of the first round of qualifying on 13 July against Swedish club Gefle IF, he came on as a 90th minute substitute for Craig Williams in the 1–2 away win. In the second leg on 27 July, Maxwell started the match before being substituted in injury time for Richard Appleby. The game finished 0–0, meaning Llanelli qualified 2–1 on aggregate. Llanelli were beaten 6–1 on aggregate in the second qualifying round by Danish club Odense BK. Maxwell received interest from Hartlepool but decided not to go on trial for family reasons.

Maxwell joined Isthmian League Premier Division club Tonbridge Angels in October 2010, before going on to join a number of non-League clubs including Braintree Town and Boreham Wood through 2006 to 2007. He then joined Northern Irish club Larne, before returning to England with Welling United . Having trialled for St Albans City in the 2009–10 pre-season, he eventually signed for the Conference South club in September 2009. He made just two appearances for the Saints, both coming on as a substitute. His début was in the 1–0 away defeat to Heybridge Swifts in the FA Cup second round qualifying on 26 September, replacing Godfrey Poku in the 46th minute.

Maxwell went on to play for Waltham Abbey, prior to signing for Harlow Town in October 2011, before leaving at the end of the season in July 2012. At the start of the 2012–13 season, Maxwell re-joined Grays Athletic in the Isthmian League Division One North alongside three other players.

He rejoined Grays again at the start of the 2013–14 season as a player-coach. In March 2014 he left and went to Heybridge Swifts, and at the start of June 2014 he signed for A.F.C. Sudbury.

He became the A.F.C. Sudbury fitness coach and played also until the middle of October 2014. His contract was terminated on 8 November and on 20 November he signed for Witham Town. He did not make many appearances at the Spa Road club during the 2014–15 season, but featured on the bench against Tonbridge Angels amongst others. On the eve of the 2015–16 season, 7 August 2015 he had re-joined one of his former clubs, Heybridge Swifts. Ware announced he had joined them on 4 August 2015 and he was still there in October 2015, however on 5 December he was back playing for Heybridge Swifts.

In January 2017 he left his position as a player-coach at Waltham Forest, alongside manager Kem Kemal. Later that year he joined Ware for his second spell, but left again in December 2017 as Kem Kamal was replaced by Craig Edwards as the manager.

== Managerial career ==
Yet another managerial change at Waltham Forest, later to be renamed to Walthamstow, saw Maxwell replace Qayum Shakoor for the position in February 2018. He also registered as a player. On 23 January 2020, Maxwell left Walthamstow after a mutual decision with the club to part ways.

On 18 November 2020, Maxwell was appointed Braintree Town manager. He was awarded the National League South Manager of the Month award for February 2022 having led his side away from the relegation zone with a seven-game unbeaten run. Following an 18-month spell with the Essex-based side in which he maintained their status as a National League South side for a second successive season, Maxwell opted to leave the club in May 2022 at the end of his contract.

In January 2023, Maxwell was appointed manager of Sittingbourne, as well as the club's director of football.

On 17 November 2025, Maxwell was appointed manager of Welling United, after having left Sittingbourne to take the role.

== Managerial statistics ==
As of match played 7 May 2022

Managerial record by team and tenure
Team	From	To	Record					Ref
Team	From	To	P	W	D	L	Win %	Ref
Walthamstow	6 February 2018	23 January 2020	50	23	13	14	46.0	
Braintree Town	18 November 2020	11 May 2022	53	16	13	24	30.2	
Total			103	39	26	38	37.9	
