= 2024–25 Kent Senior Cup =

English football tournament season

Tournament details
- Country: England
- Dates: 24 September 2024 – 2 April 2025
- Teams: 24

Final positions
- Champions: Welling United (4th title)
- Runners-up: Ebbsfleet United

Tournament statistics
- Matches played: 23
- Goals scored: 78 (3.39 per match)
- All statistics correct as of 10 December 2025.

The 2024–25 Kent Senior Cup is the 130th edition of the Kent Senior Cup. It is sponsored by DFDS and known as the DFDS Kent Senior Cup for sponsorship reasons.

Maidstone United were the defending champions, having beaten Ebbsfleet United in the 2023–24 final.

The competition was won by Welling United, who defeated the runners-up from the previous season, Ebbsfleet United, 1–0 in the final at Gillingham's Priestfield Stadium.

== First round ==
The top 8 ranked teams received a bye into the second round. These were Bromley, Dartford, Dover Athletic, Ebbsfleet United, Gillingham, Maidstone United, Tonbridge Angels, and Welling United.

24 September 2024	Deal Town	6–1	Sittingbourne	Deal
19:45 BST				Stadium: The Charles Ground

24 September 2024	Sheppey United	1–1 (3–5 p)	Hythe Town	Sheerness-on-Sea
19:45 BST				Stadium: The Havill Stadium

24 September 2024	Herne Bay	5–1	Erith Town	Herne Bay
19:45 BST				Stadium: The MBS Stadium

24 September 2024	Chatham Town	1–2	Cray Wanderers	Chatham
19:45 BST				Stadium: The Bauvill

24 September 2024	Folkestone Invicta	1–1 (4–5 p)	Phoenix Sports	Folkestone
19:45 BST				Stadium: The Alcaline Stadium

24 September 2024	Cray Valley (PM)	3–0	Ashford United	Eltham
19:45 BST				Stadium: The Artic Stadium

24 September 2024	Ramsgate	0–1	Margate	Ramsgate
19:45 BST				Stadium: Southwood Stadium

25 September 2024	Sevenoaks Town	1–3	Beckenham Town	Sevenoaks
19:30 BST				Stadium: The Bourne Stadium

== Second Round ==
8 October 2024	Ebbsfleet United	3–1	Gillingham	Northfleet
19:00 BST				Stadium: The Kuflink Stadium

15 October 2024	Bromley	3–1	Dartford	Bromley
19:45 BST				Stadium: Hayes Lane

22 October 2024	Deal Town	3–0	Hythe Town	Deal
19:45 BST				Stadium: The Charles Ground

29 October 2024	Welling United	2–1	Maidstone United	Welling
19:45 BST				Stadium: Park View Road

29 October 2024	Dover Athletic	3–1	Cray Valley (PM)	River
19:45 BST				Stadium: Crabble Athletic Ground

29 October 2024	Cray Wanderers	2–2 (5–6 p)	Phoenix Sports	Chislehurst
19:45 BST				Stadium: Flamingo Park

29 October 2024	Herne Bay	3–0	Margate	Herne Bay
19:45 BST				Stadium: MBS Stadium

12 November 2024	Tonbridge Angels	6–1	Beckenham Town	Tonbridge
19:45 BST				Stadium: Longmead Stadium

== Quarter Finals ==
3 December 2024	Dover Athletic	2–0	Deal Town	River
19:45 BST				Stadium: Crabble Athletic Ground

3 December 2024	Tonbridge Angels	2–1	Herne Bay	Tonbridge
19:45 BST				Stadium: Longmead Stadium

10 December 2024	Phoenix Sports	3–4	Welling United	Barnehurst
19:45 BST				Stadium: The Mayplace Ground

12 February 2025	Ebbsfleet United	1–1 (4–2 p)	Bromley	Northfleet
19:45 BST				Stadium: The Kuflink Stadium

== Semi-Finals ==
18 February 2025	Welling United	1–1 (5–4 p)	Dover Athletic	Welling
19:45 BST				Stadium: Park View Road; Referee: Harry Phillips

18 March 2025	Ebbsfleet United	1–0	Tonbridge Angels	Northfleet
19:45 BST				Stadium: The Kuflink Stadium; Referee: Ben McDonald

== Final ==
2 April 2025	Ebbsfleet United	0–1	Welling United	Gillingham
19:45 BST		Report	Redfearn 23'	Stadium: Priestfield Stadium; Referee: Joseph Dann-Pye
