= Noel Lister =

20th-century English businessman

Noel Lister (26 December 1927 – 29 January 2015) was the founder of MFI which became one of the United Kingdom's largest retail chains, and also the founder of UKSA (formerly the UK Sailing Academy), a youth education and maritime training charity based in Cowes on the Isle of Wight.

== Career ==
Noel Lister initially went into business trading in war surplus goods which he purchased at auction.

He co-founded MFI in 1964.

He was a keen sailor - he was a contender for the Admiral's Cup in Imp - and in 1987 secured the future of the UK Sailing Academy at Cowes by acquiring it from the Sports Council and transferring it, and a donation of £4 million, into a Trust Fund. At the time he owned the yacht, Whirlwind IX, and his vision was to provide maritime training for good quality people so that they could work on large yachts.

He died on 29 January 2015.

His children included the conservationist and philanthropist Paul Lister.
