= Hartsdown Park =

Sports venue in Kent, England

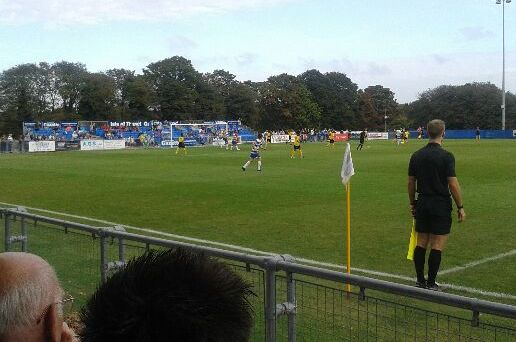
- Hartsdown Park
- Interactive map of Hartsdown Park
- Full name: Hartsdown Park
- Location: Margate, Kent, England
- Coordinates: 51°22′47″N 1°22′27″E
- Owner: Thanet District Council
- Operator: Margate
- Capacity: 3,000 (400 seats)
- Surface: 3G Artificial Turf

Construction
- Built: 1929
- Opened: 1929

Tenants
- Margate F.C. (1929–2002, 2005–present); Thanet Vikings (1986)

Hartsdown Park is a football stadium located in Margate, Kent, England. It has been the home of Margate (known as Thanet United F.C. between 1981 and 1989) since 1929, apart from between 2002 and 2005, when the club was forced to share the grounds of other Kent clubs while protracted redevelopment work occurred.

Although the football club was able to return to the stadium in 2005, redevelopment work is still at a very early stage, and many of the ground's facilities are still of a temporary nature. Nonetheless, the club has extensive plans for the future development of the site.

== History ==
The stadium has been the home of Margate F.C. since 1929, the same year the park itself opened to the public. The local council had purchased the former grounds of Hartsdown House for public use and built a stadium which it was agreed the football club would lease, initially at a charge of £200 per year. Initially the players had to change in Hartsdown House itself, approximately 200 yards (180 m) from the pitch. A small wooden grandstand with 500 bench seats was soon added, followed shortly afterwards by new dressing rooms and a second stand on the north side of the ground containing a mixture of standing and seated accommodation. The first ever match at the new stadium was a friendly against Folkestone on 31 August 1929 and the first competitive match a Kent League fixture against Dover two weeks later. In 1934 the club entered into an agreement to become a nursery team for Arsenal, and as part of the agreement the Hartsdown pitch was altered to exactly match the size of that at Highbury.

Further covered spectator accommodation was erected at the ground in 1935, but this blew down in a storm in 1952 and had to be rebuilt. At around the same time the club added a new terrace next to the main stand, where supporters had previously stood on banked earth. A new covered terrace was installed at the Tivoli Park Avenue end of the ground in the late 1950s, officially named the Cornhill Stand but more usually known to fans as the Coffin End, the name deriving from a prominent piece of graffiti which adorned its rear wall for many years. The club's first set of floodlights was erected in September 1959 and inaugurated with a friendly match against West Ham United.

In 1966 a new clubhouse was built, but there was little further development of the ground, although in the late 1980s the North Stand, which had been condemned by council officials was demolished and the clubhouse extended. In 1982 the club was nearly evicted from the ground by the local council after its name change to Thanet United. A legal loophole was discovered which meant that the lease on the ground was held in the name of Margate F.C. and therefore the renamed club was technically no longer permitted to use the stadium, but this was eventually resolved and the club was allowed to remain. Upon promotion to the Football Conference in 2001 the club spent £175,000 on improvements designed to bring the stadium up to the standard required for that level of football, but soon afterwards launched an ambitious scheme to completely redevelop the site. The club moved out and the old stadium, which was constructed mainly from timber and corrugated iron, was demolished in early 2003, but the local council disputed the plans submitted. Although planned to be completed by August 2003, the redevelopment process lasted for three years, delayed by issues regarding planning permission for the commercial facilities the club wanted to build in addition to the stadium itself. The team ground-shared with other Kent clubs for three seasons, but club officials' failure to confirm a return date to Hartsdown led to Margate's expulsion from the Conference National in 2004. In 2005 the club was finally able to return to the ground, albeit with pre-fabricated stands and temporary buildings in place. Five years later, plans for the redevelopment of the north end of the ground, reportedly including the construction of a new terrace, a bar, and a three-storey hotel, were approved. Club chairman Keith Piper also announced that companies had expressed interest in paying for the naming rights of individual stands or even the entire stadium. In June 2022, the club announced plans to install new changing rooms using funding from the Premier League Stadium Fund.

In March 2023, it was announced that Canterbury City would be groundsharing with Margate for the following season.

== Structure and facilities ==
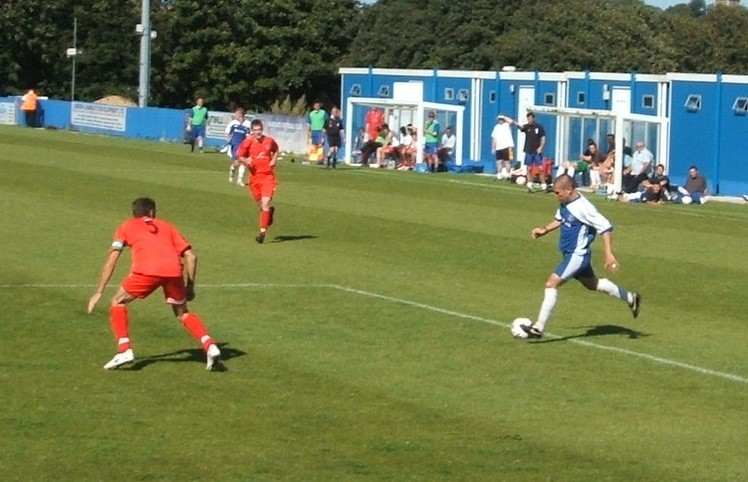
Some of the temporary buildings currently in place at the stadium are visible in this 2007 photograph.

As most of the stadium was demolished and little of the proposed redevelopment work has as yet been carried out at Hartsdown Park, the stadium's current facilities are limited. On the south side of the pitch, the site of the former main stand, portable buildings are in place behind the dugouts. The opposite side of the ground currently contains two prefabricated seated stands.

Behind the goal at the western end of the ground, known as the Hartsdown Road end, the one terrace remaining from before the redevelopment work has been renovated, along with the clubhouse behind it. A plan was reportedly in place for a temporary standing structure at the opposite end of the ground, known as the Tivoli Park Avenue end, but this has yet to come to fruition.

The first stage in the wider development of the site was the construction of a 5-a-side pitch complex. Although it was initially announced that work was to begin on the complex in May 2007, ground was not in fact broken for a further four months. The complex opened on 9 December 2007.

== Future ==
The club's ultimate plan involves a stadium with a capacity of 5,000 forming part of a complex incorporating a hotel, fitness centre, conference centre, all-weather pitch and ten 5-a-side pitches. In 2004 the club's stadium manager, Keith Piper quoted the total cost of the hotel alone as more than £6,000,000, but stated that the club had sufficient financial backing. The following year the total cost of the project, which it was revealed would be funded by developers CNC Properties, was put at £8,000,000. It has been claimed that the redevelopment will raise the standard of the stadium to that required for entry to the Football League.

== Other uses ==
The stadium was used as the home venue for the Thanet Vikings American football club during the late 1980s. It was also the venue for a charity match held in 2006 in memory of former Margate player Paul Sykes, who collapsed and died while playing for Folkestone Invicta, in which current and former professionals Andy Hessenthaler, Adrian Pennock and Danny Spiller played.

== Records ==
The highest attendance recorded for a Margate match at Hartsdown Park was 14,169 for the visit of Tottenham Hotspur in the FA Cup on 13 January 1973. The lowest attendance recorded was 29, for a match against Salisbury City on 24 April 1986.

== Transport ==
The stadium is approximately 0.7 miles (1 km) from Margate railway station, which lies on Southeastern's Chatham Main Line from London Victoria to Ramsgate and is also the northern terminus of the Kent Coast Line to Dover Priory.
