= 1984 English Greyhound Derby =

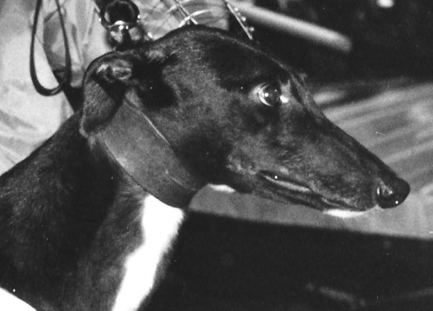
- Whisper Wishes
- Location: White City Stadium
- Start date: 2 June
- End date: 23 June
- Total prize money: £25,000 (winner)

The 1984 Daily Mirror Greyhound Derby took place during June with the final being held on 23 June 1984 at White City Stadium. It was the last time that White City held the event due to impending closure. The winner was Whisper Wishes and the winning owner John Duffy received £25,000. The competition was sponsored by the Daily Mirror.

== Final result ==
At White City (over 500 metres):

Position	Name of Greyhound	Breeding	Trap	SP	Time	Trainer
1st	Whisper Wishes	Sand Man - Micklem Drive	4	7-4f	29.43	Charlie Coyle (Maidstone)
2nd	Morans Beef	Noble Brigg - Rathkenny Bride	5	9-4	29.47	Ger McKenna (Ireland)
3rd	Proud Dodger	Brave Bran - Lady Peg	6	7-1	29.49	Francie Murray (Ireland)
4th	The Jolly Norman	Knockrour Brandy - Breeze Valley	3	20-1	29.55	George Curtis (Hove)
5th	House of Hope	Pat Seamur - Fearless Speed	1	12-1	29.57	Jim Wood (Private)
6th	Spartacus	Knockrour Slave - I'm a Star	2	9-2	30.07	Matt O'Donnell (Ireland)

=== Distances ===
½, head, ¾, head, 6¼ (lengths)
The distances between the greyhounds are in finishing order and shown in lengths. One length is equal to 0.08 of one second.

== Competition Report ==
Thirty Irish entries were received for Derby including the Ger McKenna trained Morans Beef, Glenbrien Champ, Count Five, Back Garden and Lauragh Six. Ante-post favourite's were Game Ball now trained by Jerry Fisher and Whisper Wishes, eliminated from the competition at the second-round stage twelve months earlier.

The qualifying round ended with Glenbrien Champ and the Grace Peppercorn trained Ebony Tim winning well and the Irish won eight of the sixteen heats. One of the first round heats resulted in a one-two for McKenna as Lauragh Six beat Count Five with Game Ball scraping through in third. Best heat winner was another Irish entry Dipmac trained by Seamus Graham. Matt O’Donnell's Powersville Jet became the new favourite after recording a second round time of 29.24 just one length ahead of Proud Dodger, Game Ball tumbled out after failing to take third place from Lauragh Six.

The Irish made up half of the 24 runners left in the quarter-finals but Dipmac failed to progress from heat one and picked up a wrist injury. Heat two went to Whisper Wishes in 29.32 and the Irish had another bad result in the third heat when Powersville Jet and Count Five both went out after trouble along with Amazing Man a finalist from the previous year. The fourth and final heat was an Irish clean sweep, Proud Dodger won from Back Garden and Morans Beef.

The first semifinal saw Morans Beef win well and The Jolly Norman finished strongly to take second from the fading Spartacus with favourite Glenbrien Champ not making the final. The other semi went to Whisper Wishes recording a fourth straight win since his preliminary round defeat. The privately trained House of Hope came home second from Proud Dodger and both Lauragh Six and Geoff DeMulder's Nippy Law encountered trouble.

The final White City Derby went to Whisper Wishes trained by Charlie Coyle at (Maidstone) who led from the traps again and became a deserved winner holding off a persistent challenge from Moran's Beef and the late surge from Proud Dodger.

== Quarter-finals ==
Heat 1 (June 14)
Pos	Name	SP	Time
1st	Nippy Law	3-1	29.41
2nd	The Jolly Norman	25-1	29.47
3rd	House of Hope	25-1	29.53
4th	Gracious	7-2	29.61
5th	Dipmac	5-4f	29.77
6th	Brilliant Hope	11-2	29.91

Heat 2 (June 14)
Pos	Name	SP	Time
1st	Whisper Wishes	11-10f	29.32
2nd	Spartacus	11-4	29.44
3rd	Brown Beetle	33-1	29.78
4th	Ebony Tim	16-1	29.92
5th	Michigan Man	6-1	29.93
6th	Wheres Willie	6-1	30.09

Heat 3 (June 14)
Pos	Name	SP	Time
1st	Glenbrien Champ	8-1	29.49
2nd	Wyoming Ivy	33-1	29.53
3rd	Lauragh Six	11-4	29.56
4th	Amazing Man	6-1	29.74
5th	Powersville Jet	5-2jf	29.77
6th	Count Five	5-2jf	29.79

Heat 4 (June 14)
Pos	Name	SP	Time
1st	Proud Dodger	11-4f	29.49
2nd	Back Garden	6-1	29.50
3rd	Morans Beef	3-1	29.54
4th	Glatton Grange	3-1	30.02
5th	Westmead Milos	7-2	30.05
6th	Swift Spirit	66-1	30.21

== Semifinals ==
First Semifinal (Jun 16)
Pos	Name of Greyhound	SP	Time	Trainer
1st	Morans Beef	9-2	29.51	McKenna
2nd	The Jolly Norman	8-1	29.71	Curtis
3rd	Spartacus	9-4	29.75	O'Donnell
4th	Brown Beetle	33-1	29.85	
5th	Back Garden	3-1	29.88	McKenna
6th	Glenbrien Champ	2-1f	30.16	McKenna

Second Semifinal (Jun 16)
Pos	Name of Greyhound	SP	Time	Trainer
1st	Whisper Wishes	7-4f	29.53	Coyle
2nd	House of Hope	33-1	29.65	Wood
3rd	Proud Dodger	7-2	29.77	Murray
4th	Lauragh Six	3-1	30.07	McKenna
5th	Wyoming Ivy	14-1	30.19	
6th	Nippy Law	4-1	30.37	De Mulder

== See also ==
- 1984 UK & Ireland Greyhound Racing Year
