= Maidstone United F.C. (1897) =

Former association football club in England

Maidstone United
- Full name: Maidstone United Football Club
- Nickname: The Stones
- Founded: 1897
- Dissolved: 1992 (Maidstone Invicta are now also known as Maidstone United)
Home colours

The original Maidstone United was an English football club from Maidstone, Kent, which existed from 1897 to 1992. The club played in the Football League Fourth Division from 1989 until their demise in 1992. During their time in the Football League Maidstone played their games at Dartford's Watling Street ground. The club also played in various amateur leagues and the Southern League, which was the major semi-professional league in southern England until the formation of the Alliance Premier League (now the National League) in 1979.

== History ==
Maidstone United was formed in 1897 and played primarily in the Kent League. After WWII, they joined various amateur leagues such as the Corinthian, Athenian and the Isthmian League.

They joined the Southern League, the major semi-professional league in southern England, in 1971–72. Their first season as a semi-professional outfit almost brought instant success as the team finished third in the Southern League Division 1 (South), just failing to win promotion behind Waterlooville and Ramsgate. Attendances were much improved from the amateur days with local derbies against Tonbridge and Gravesend & Northfleet drawing respectable attendances of more than 2000. The following season Maidstone finished top and were promoted to the Southern League Premier Division. They continued to progress and during their six-year spell in the league they finished in the top five on four occasions. In 1979 they became founder members of the Alliance Premier League (now the National League), and won the league title twice, in 1984 and 1989.

At the time of their first championship, Maidstone failed to gain promotion to the Football League because they lost out in the re-election system that the League employed at the time. By the time Maidstone United won the Conference again in 1989, automatic promotion and relegation had been introduced. Maidstone thus became members of the Football League Fourth Division.

In 1988 the Stones left their ground in Maidstone, having sold the land on which it stood to MFI. The ground was not considered large enough for league football, so they switched to ground-sharing with Dartford for their home matches. This caused average attendances to fall from around 2,400 to 1,400.

After a shaky start in their first season in the Fourth Division (1989–90) they reached the promotion play-offs but lost to eventual winners Cambridge United in a dramatic two-leg semi-final which saw Cambridge striker Dion Dublin score twice in the second period of extra time to seal victory. Their form in the following season went from very good to very poor in a short period of time, which prompted the controversial sacking of manager Keith Peacock. The next manager was former Blackpool and Northampton Town boss Graham Carr.

=== Decline and collapse ===
By this time, the club was lurching into serious financial problems. It had spent large sums getting into the Football League and the outlay continued after the promotion. Running costs were unsustainable, and attendances were falling as a result of Maidstone's disappointing form in the 1990–91 season, and the onset of a recession. The club's finances spiralled out of control, with large debts being run up. The club then took a massive gamble, and without any planning permission, purchased a piece of land east of Maidstone for £400,000 with a view to building a new stadium on it. By being able to return to Maidstone, the club believed it would be able to afford to continue in the Football League. However, the gamble did not pay off and the club's planning application to build on the land was turned down by the council.

The entire squad of players was put up for sale to raise cash in an attempt to save the club. During the 1991–92 season, the club itself was put on the market. With huge debts, no ground and a poor team, there was little interest, although a consortium from the north east wanted to buy the club, move it to Tyneside and merge it with Newcastle Blue Star F.C.

On the football side, Graham Carr was sacked after a poor run of results at the start of the 1991–92 season, and Bill Williams had little success in trying to improve Maidstone's results when he returned for another spell as manager, standing down after just four months. His assistant Clive Walker (not to be confused with the former Chelsea player) took over, and managed to keep the Stones off the foot of the table. Walker's managerial skills, combined with the efforts of the few capable players left at the club (notably young Gary Breen and Dean Heath, goalkeeper Iain Hesford, defender Bradley Sandeman and winger Liburd Henry) saw them through, although debts remained huge and the threat of being forced out of the Football League remained.

There was no threat of relegation in 1992 as the Football League was taking an additional member that season. Maidstone finished 18th of 22 clubs in the Fourth Division, after the 23rd club, Aldershot, had been declared bankrupt and forced to resign from the league on 25 March 1992 after playing 36 games, results of which were declared void.

The 1992–93 season saw the creation of the Premier League from the old First Division, with the Second Division becoming Division One, the Third Division becoming Division Two, and the Fourth Division becoming Division Three. The Stones would be founder members of the new Division Three, but as the new season came closer it looked more and more unlikely that the Stones would be able to play in it as their financial worries showed no sign of easing and debts reaching £650,000, despite hundreds of thousands of pounds having recently been raised by the sale of players including Warren Barton, Mark Gall and Steve Butler.

They were due to play their first game of the season away to Scunthorpe United on 15 August 1992 but by this stage only two players (defender Gary Stebbing and striker Glen Donegal) were still registered to the club, and the Watling Street stadium had been sold the previous month, leaving Maidstone without a home and not knowing where they would be playing their home games if they remained in existence.

As a result, the match was cancelled. A plan to relocate the club to the north east of England and merge with Newcastle Blue Star was rejected by the Football League, which ruled that the club had to remain in the county of Kent.

After their opening game of the season was cancelled, Maidstone United was given until the following Monday to guarantee that it would be able to fulfill its fixtures. Unable to come up with the necessary backing, it resigned from the league on 17 August and went into liquidation.

Maidstone had been due to contest the Football League Cup first round against Reading, with the first leg played on 19 August, and its demise meant that Reading received a bye to the second round. The final competitive game that the club played had been at Doncaster Rovers on 2 May 1992, the final day of the Fourth Division; the game ended in a 3–0 defeat for the Kent side.

It was 27 years until another club was forced out of the Football League due to bankruptcy - Bury FC in August 2019. A number of former league clubs, including Scarborough, Halifax Town, Chester City and Rushden & Diamonds have gone bankrupt and ceased to exist since Maidstone United, but all had dropped into the non-league divisions by the time of their demise, though when Chester City went out of business in March 2010, less than a year had passed since their relegation from the Football League. However, numerous Football League and even a small number of Premier League clubs have come very close to suffering the same fate as Maidstone since 1992; these include Wimbledon, Bradford City, Crystal Palace, Sheffield Wednesday, Leeds United and Portsmouth.

The void left by the club in the town of Maidstone was filled by the new Maidstone United, who were known as Maidstone Invicta until 1994.

Maidstone's departure from the Football League at the beginning of the 1992–93 season meant that membership of the four professional divisions in English football had fallen to 92 clubs from the previous total of 93; the collapse of Maidstone (as well as Aldershot earlier in 1992) meant that the league was two clubs short of the total of 94 clubs that it had been hoping to have as members for the 1992–93 season. The possibility of the previous season's Conference runners-up, Wycombe Wanderers, being allowed to take Maidstone's place in Division Three was quickly ruled out by the Football League, as the Football League confirmed that it was too late for a new member to be admitted for the current season. However, Wycombe achieved promotion that season as Conference champions. The Football League's three remaining divisions were not rebalanced until 1995, when the knock-on effects Premier League's decision to reduce its membership from 22 to 20 clubs resulted in the Third Division expanding back to 24.

The league also ruled that no other clubs would be allowed to relocate (whether temporarily or permanently) by a distance comparable to that of Maidstone, who had moved some 40 miles from their traditional home to ground-share with Dartford, and had seen their average attendance halve as a result. However, a decade later Wimbledon F.C. were given permission to relocate 70 miles from South London to Milton Keynes, a move which saw the club rebranded as Milton Keynes Dons, although a group of Wimbledon fans set up their own club (AFC Wimbledon) to ensure that the London Borough of Merton continued to be represented by a football team of note.

The circumstances which led to the collapse of Maidstone United also contributed to a decision by the Football League that all clubs which finished champions of the Conference must meet stadium capacity requirements (6,000 total capacity, including at least 1,000 seats) by 31 December of their title-winning season. Although Wycombe Wanderers won promotion to the league as Conference champions for 1992–93, playing in their well-equipped new Adams Park stadium, the next three seasons saw Kidderminster Harriers, Macclesfield Town and Stevenage Borough all denied promotion to the Football League for this reason. Kidderminster's assurances in 1994 that their Aggborough stadium would soon have well over 1,000 seats (although it could already comfortably hold 8,000 spectators overall) fell on deaf ears, although their denial of a Football League place saved the league career of Northampton Town, and Kidderminster did finally reach the Football League six years later, although they stayed there for just five seasons before being relegated. Macclesfield were denied promotion in similar circumstances a year later, but their Moss Rose home was swiftly brought up to scratch and they were admitted to the league when they won the Conference title in 1997. However, when Stevenage Borough won the Conference title in 1996 and became the third successive champions of that division to be denied promotion due to their sub-standard stadium, they had to wait 14 years before achieving promotion.

== Colours and badge ==
Since the formation of Maidstone United the club's main colours have been amber and black. Records show that the club's first home kit consisted of an amber and black striped shirt with white shorts, however between 1922 and 1955 the kit was changed to amber shirts with black shorts. From 1970 to 1973, Maidstone adopted an all-white home kit, but returned to their traditional amber and black colours after this time. All white became the club's traditional away kit, although the club also had purple and blue away shirts over the years.

Maidstone stayed away from 'logo' type badges, using the towns coat of arms, except that the town's motto "Agriculture and Commerce" was replaced with "Maidstone United FC". The new Maidstone eventually replaced it, but retained the original badge as a formal crest for stationery and signage.

== Stadiums ==
The original Maidstone United played at the Athletic Ground on London Road. However, the ground was sold for development and the club relocated to Dartford's Watling Street in 1988. In an attempt to return to Maidstone, the club's board bought a piece of land east of the town in Hollingbourne. However the council rejected the club's planning application to build on the purchased land, because the site was in a conservation area.

Years	Ground
1898–1988	Athletic Ground, London Road
1988–1992	Watling Street (Groundshare with Dartford)

== Honours ==
- Conference (level 5)
  - 1983–84, 1988–89
- Conference Challenge Shield
  - 1989–90
- Southern League First Division (level 6)
  - 1972–73

=== Minor ===
- Athenian League
  - Runners-up: 1957–58
- Corinthian League
  - Champions: 1955–56
  - Memorial Shield Winners (1): 1955–56
- Kent League
  - Champions (5): 1898–99, 1899–1900, 1900–01, 1921–22, 1922–23
- Kent Amateur League
  - Champions (1): 1978–79
  - Cup Winners (2): 1978–79, 1979–80
- East Kent League
  - Division One Champions (2): 1897–98, 1898–99
- Thames & Medway Combination
  - Winners (5): 1905–06, 1906–07, 1912–13, 1920–21, 1921–22
  - Runners-Up (6): 1901–02, 1903–04, 1911–12, 1919–20, 1922–23, 1955–56
  - Section B Winners (1): 1910–11
- Essex & Herts Border Combination
  - Champions (2): 1983–84, 1986–87
  - Cup Winners: 1983–84
  - Sportsmanship Shield Winners: 1986–87
- Eastern Floodlight League
  - Winners (1): 1976–77
  - S. Thames Section Winners: 1975–76
- Kent Senior Cup
  - Winners (16): 1898–99, 1900–01, 1902–03, 1906–07, 1908–09, 1913–14, 1919–20, 1921–22, 1922–23, 1965–66, 1975–76, 1978–79, 1979–80, 1981–82, 1988–89, 1989–90
  - Runners-Up (11): 1898–99, 1900–01, 1920–21, 1963–64, 1973–74, 1974–75, 1977–78, 1979–80, 1983–84, 1986–87, 1987–88
- Kent Senior Shield
  - Runners-up: 1919–20, 1921–22
- Kent Intermediate Cup
  - Runners-Up (1): 1986–87
- Kent Amateur Cup
  - Winners (3): 1955–56, 1960–61, 1961–62
  - Runners-Up (4): 1947–48, 1953–54, 1956–57, 1964–65
- Kent Floodlight Cup
  - Winners (1): 1972–73
  - Runners-Up (1): 1968–69
- Kent Floodlight Trophy
  - Winners (2): 1976–77, 1977–78
- Kent Victory Cup
  - Runners-Up (1): 1919–20
- Kent Messenger Trophy
  - Winners (1): 1973–74
  - Runners-Up (1): 1974–75
- B&W Champions Cup
  - Winners (1): 1987–88
- Bob Lord Trophy
  - Runners-Up (1): 1984–85
- F. Budden Trophy
  - Winners (1): 1984–85
- Eastern Pro-Floodlight Cup
  - Runners-Up (1): 1979–80
- Stutchbury Fuels Challenge Cup
  - Winners (1): 1986–87
- West Kent Challenge Cup
  - Winners (1): 1979–80
  - Runners-Up (1): 1982–83
- Anglo-Dutch Jubilee Cup
  - Winners: 1977–78
- Bromley Hospital Cup
  - Winners: 1961–62
- Chatham Charity Cup
  - Runners-up: 1920–21, 1921–22

== Records ==
League positions/cup runs

- FA Cup best run – 5th Round – 2023/24
- FA Trophy best run – Quarter final (replay) – 1986/87
- Best league position – Football League Fourth Division – 5th – 1989/90

Other records

- Most appearances – Fred Baker 383
- Highest transfer fee received – Warren Barton (£300,000)
