= Athletic Ground, Maidstone =

Football ground and greyhound racing track in England

- Interactive map of Athletic Ground, Maidstone
- Location: Maidstone
- Coordinates: 51°16′44″N 0°30′31″E

Construction
- Opened: 1898
- Renovated: 1976
- Closed: 1988

Tenants
- Football and later Greyhound racing

The Athletic Ground was a football ground and later a greyhound racing track in Maidstone.

== Football ==
Maidstone United Football Club played at the Athletic Ground on the London Road since it had been built way back in 1898 right up until the football club agreed to sell the site for re-development in 1988.

== Greyhound Racing ==
Greyhound racing was not brought to Maidstone until 1976 following an agreement with Horace Luper and the Maidstone United Football Club.

The first meeting was held on Friday 1 October 1976 at 7.35pm. The greyhound operation was organised by H Luper & Associates Greyhounds Ltd and they built a track around the football pitch which was described as having a good running surface and offering distances of 254, 443, 634 and 1,015 metres.

The track was affiliated to the National Greyhound Racing Club (NGRC) when it opened and the contracted trainers brought in to supply the runners were Don Thornton, Mrs. E Follows, Vernon Ford, Peter Isaac, Mrs. Pat Butler, David Ingram-Seal and Des Dare. There were also two owner trainers Bill Bookle and Mrs. B Luscombe.

After the greyhound racing suffered a temporary closure it reopened under 'Todos Promotions' in 1981 and they made further alterations to the layout of the track. The circumference was changed to 376 metres with slight alterations in the distances changing to 454, 644 and 830 metres. Steve Hibbard conducted the role of both General and Racing Manager following the death of the first General Manager Tom Jones. The reopening took place on 9 October 1981 with regular racing taking place on Tuesday, Friday and Saturday evenings.

Despite being such a small track in terms of stature it was to experience one of the greatest greyhounds in greyhound racing history called Whisper Wishes. Whisper Wishes was a black dog whelped in August 1981 and a son of Sand Man. He was bred in Ireland by Mrs G. Naylor out of her brood bitch, Micklem Drive. After a year that consisted of only 15 races, winning six including the Courage Select Stakes at Wembley he came into the ownership of Irishman John Duffy. Duffy would pencil in the Derby for his hound and put him with Maidstone's Charlie Coyle which of course resulted in him becoming the 1984 English Greyhound Derby champion. The Derby win alone put Whisper Wishes amongst prestigious company but the greatness came later because he was about to embark on a stud career which many would argue was the most successful in history.

Trainer Mel Cumner brought more success to Maidstone in 1987 when her hurdler Cavan Town completed the English/Scottish Grand National double. One year later Catch Ruby secured the Greenwich Cup title for Harry White.

Maidstone did not have the opportunity for their reputation to grow further because the football club had agreed to sell the site for re-development. The final meeting was held on 30 April 1988 with Movealong Jewel claiming the last race. greyhound racing The site today on Leafy Lane is a small retail park.

=== Track records ===
Distance metres	Greyhound	Time	Date
454	Westmead Wish	28.21	1987
644	Myarny	41.16	1987
850	Malibu Light	54.38	1987
