= Watling Street (Dartford) =

Football ground in Dartford, England

- Interactive map of Watling Street
- Location: Dartford, England
- Coordinates: 51.4403°N 0.2465°E
- Surface: Grass

Construction
- Opened: 1921
- Closed: 1992
- Demolished: 1992

Tenants
- Dartford F.C. (1921–1992); Maidstone United (1988–1992)

Watling Street was a football ground in Dartford, England. Located adjacent to Watling Street, it was the home ground of Dartford F.C. from 1921 until 1992, and was also used by Maidstone United during their time in the Football League.

== History ==
Dartford F.C. purchased the five-acre site of Watling Street in 1921 for £1,000. A seated stand on the western touchline was built for £3,000, with banking installed around the rest of the pitch. In 1926 the stand burnt down and a 1,000-seat stand was built in its place, with a covered enclosure added on the eastern touchline in 1930. Terracing was installed behind the southern goal in 1947, and later in front of the western stand.

In 1988 Maidstone United moved to Watling Street after selling their Athletic Ground to MFI. They won the Football Conference in 1988–89 and were promoted to the Fourth Division of the Football League. The first Football League match played at Watling Street on 26 August 1989 saw Maidstone beat Scarborough 4–1 in front of 3,372 spectators.

Due to financial problems, the club folded at the start of the 1992–93 season. The last Football League match had been played at the ground on 25 April 1992, with just 1,602 watching a 0–0 draw with Mansfield Town. Maidstone's demise also led to Dartford folding. The ground improvements made by Maidstone were sold to Dartford for around £500,000, which pushed the club's debt too far. Watling Street was sold to pay off creditors, and immediately demolished, with the site used for housing. The site is now Cugley Road, Burman Close and Horsfield Close (which are named after Dartford players), and The Terraces.
