= MFI (retailer) =

British furniture & homewares brand

MFI Limited
- New MFI Logo 2025
- Industry: Furniture Homewares
- Founded: 1964; 62 years ago
- Founders: Noel Lister; Donald Searle
- Defunct: 2008 (original company)
- Successor: MFI (online brand; revived in 2011, 2016, and 2025)
- Parent: Victorian Plumbing
- Website: www.mfi.co.uk
- Footnotes; Brand name has been reused by separate entities post-2008

MFI Limited is an online British furniture & homewares retailer. Originally founded in 1964 by Noel Lister and Donald Searle as Mullard Furniture Industries. At its peak, it was one of the largest suppliers of fitted kitchens and bedroom furniture in the United Kingdom, operating primarily from out-of-town retail parks.

The company offered a wide range of furniture products, including items for bedrooms, bathrooms, kitchens, living rooms, dining areas, and home offices.

Despite its early success, MFI faced recurring financial difficulties in later years, undergoing multiple changes of ownership. The MFI brand was relaunched twice by Victoria Plumb: first in 2011 and then under its new name VictoriaPlum.com in 2016.

VictoriaPlum.com (including the MFI brand) was acquired from administration by rival Victorian Plumbing in 2024, with Victorian Plumbing is relaunching MFI.

== History ==
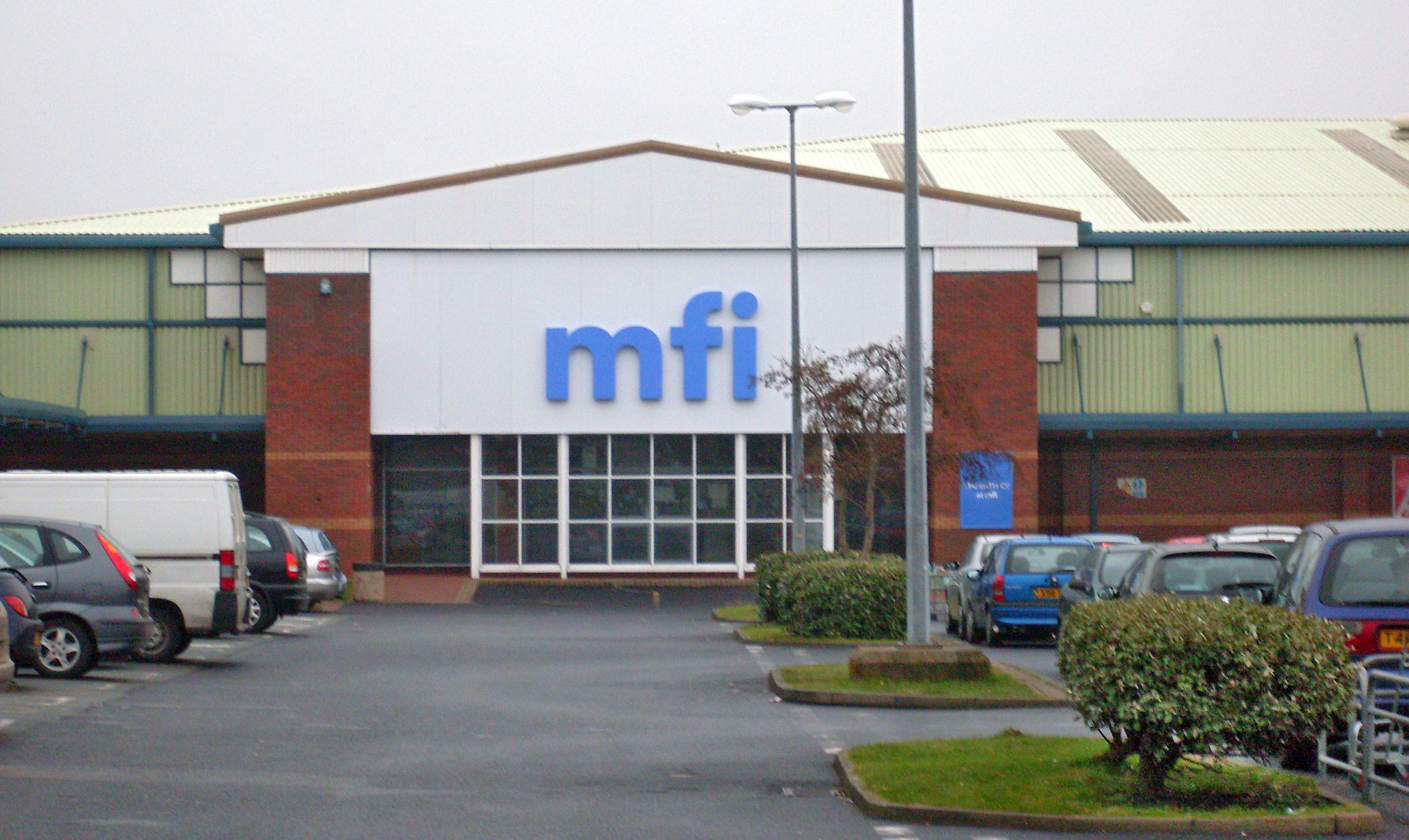
MFI store in Southport shortly after closure in December 2008

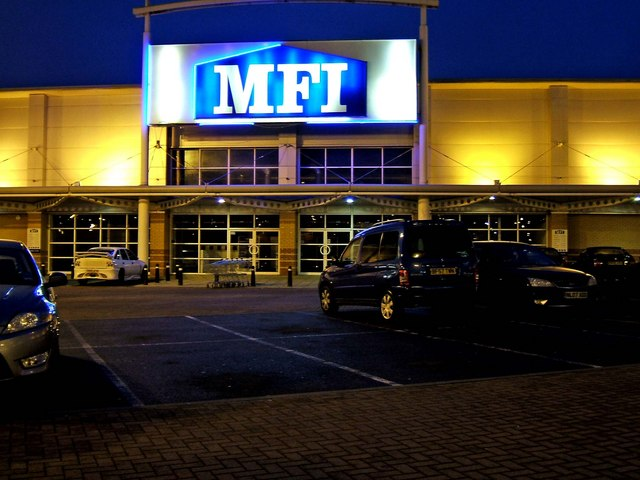
MFI store in Kidderminster displaying older branding

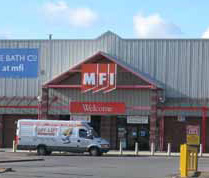
An older MFI store in Durham with another version of the branding

The MFI Retail business was founded in 1964 as Mullard Furniture Industries by two British men, Noel Lister and Donald Searle, who previously traded in war surplus goods. It was named after Searle's wife's maiden name. The company became a public company in 1971, as MFI Warehouses (the Group). An external manager, Derek Hunt, was recruited soon afterwards.

In 1982, owners of Hygena, Norcros, were looking to dissolve the company and sell the Hygena name. This was purchased jointly in 1982 by MFI Group and Malcolm Healey's company; Humber Kitchens.

In the 1980s, the group entered into partnerships, notably in 1985 with Asda. The Asda connection was soon dissolved over concerns about the company's future, and there was a management buy-out in October 1987. Also in MFI took full control of Hygena in 1987, buying Healey out for £200 million. In November 1988, MFI acquired Schreiber Furniture.

With the advent of out of town shopping during the 1980s, MFI Retail opened a host of stores in such developments. In 1985, it was the very first tenant of the Merry Hill Shopping Centre at Brierley Hill in the West Midlands, opening a new store, which within four years, was part of the largest shopping complex in Western Europe.

MFI Retail was known for being one of the first ever companies to be investigated by the BBC programme Watchdog. In the 1980s, the programme attempted to buy a £600 kitchen advertised by MFI, though the price only actually included kitchen units and not the appliances shown. (Note: Watchdog continued to cover MFI in its consumer affairs, calling it "so familiar it feels like an old friend".) When the Watchdog crew arrived at a branch of the company, they were immediately confronted by a manager who evicted them from the store.

MFI Retail gained a new rival in October 1987, when Swedish furniture retailer IKEA began trading in Britain, and expanded over the coming years. Soon afterwards, DIY retail giant B&Q expanded into the furniture market, and emerged as a surprise new rival for the business. Despite this, the MFI Group was still expanding in November 2002, when it took over Sofa Workshop.

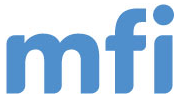
Logo introduced in 2002

During 2004 to 2005, serious and highly publicised IT problems affecting customers damaged MFI Retail's credibility, and the finance director and chief operating officer left the Group.

By 2005, it was obvious that MFI Retail's fortunes were declining. Despite the British economy still being strong and recession not even on the horizon, it was reported that sales for 2005 had fallen to £742 million compared to £854 million in 2003. In September 2006, the MFI Retail business was acquired by Merchant Equity Partners for £1 after which the parent company changed its name to Galiform.

Anecdotally, it was said in September 2006 that one in three Sunday lunches in the United Kingdom were cooked in a kitchen from MFI, and 60% of British children were conceived in a bedroom from MFI.

In September 2007, MFI Retail decided to withdraw, after criticisms had been made, a television advert showing a woman slapping her husband in the face twice and shouting at him for leaving the toilet seat up. Those complaining felt that the advert trivialised the issue of domestic violence against men. The ASA concluded that it "was likely to cause serious or widespread complaints from viewers and could be seen to condone intimidation, domestic violence and aggression as an acceptable way to resolve issues". The ASA went as far as to state that "it could also cause social, moral or psychological harm to children" and they were "concerned that it had been broadcast at all". As a result, the advertisement was banned.

MFI Retail was the subject of a second management buyout in September 2008, but by this stage the British economy was sliding into recession, unemployment was rising and retail sales were falling. MFI's future was looking bleak.

Early on 25 November 2008, the BBC first reported the possibility of MFI Retail going into administration, with MFI desiring a three-month rent free period from landlords. Later the following day, it was announced that no agreement could be reached and PropertyWeek reported that Menzies Corporate Restructuring had been appointed as administrators. On 26 November 2008, after a board meeting MFI went into administration.

On 19 December 2008, all 111 MFI stores were closed with the loss of 1,200 jobs.

=== 2011 and 2015 online relaunches ===
Following its closure, the MFI brand was purchased by Victoria Plumb, and was relaunched as an online only retailer on 30 November 2011 only for it to cease trading again in July 2015.

Following a rebrand in 2015, Victoria Plumb became VictoriaPlum.com and announced that it was to expand into other home product categories. As part of this expansion, VictoriaPlum.com announced on 17 March 2016 that it was set to revive the MFI brand name, to represent its exclusive collection of low cost, value for money bedroom furniture.

=== 2025 proposed re-launch ===
VictoriaPlum.com (including the MFI brand) was acquired by rival Victorian Plumbing from administration in 2024. Victorian Plumbing relaunched MFI in May 2025. Victorian Plumbing says its relaunch of MFI represents its strategic entry into the furniture and homewares market, which is adjacent to its current bathroom offering.
