= List of Metropolitan League seasons =

The Metropolitan League ran for twenty-two seasons between 1949–50 and 1970–71.

== 1949–50 ==
The league was composed of:

- Callender's Athletic
- Chingford Town Reserves (from the London League Premier Division)
- Chipperfield (from the Herts County League Division One)
- Dagenham
- Dickinson (Apsley) (from the Herts County League Division One)
- Headington United Reserves
- Hammersmith United
- Hove (from the Sussex County League)
- St Neots & District (from the South Midlands League Premier Division)
- Twickenham

Pos	Team	Pld	W	D	L	GF	GA	GD	Pts	Notes
1	St Neots & District	16	12	2	2	63	21	+42	26	
2	Dagenham	16	11	4	1	62	23	+39	26	
3	Callender's Athletic	16	11	3	2	69	29	+40	25	
4	Headington United Reserves	16	10	3	3	57	31	+26	23	
5	Chingford Town Reserves	16	7	2	7	31	32	−1	16	
6	Twickenham	16	4	2	10	39	51	−12	10	
7	Dickinson (Apsley)	16	2	3	11	20	42	−22	7	
8	Chipperfield	16	2	3	11	25	61	−36	7	
9	Hove	16	1	2	13	16	92	−76	4	Changed name to Hove United
–	Hammersmith United	0	–	–	–	–	–	—	0	Withdrew during season, record expunged

Source: Non-League Matters

== 1950–51 ==
Eight new clubs joined the league in its second season;

- Brighton & Hove Albion 'A'
- Croydon Rovers
- Dunstable Town
- Hastings United Reserves (from the London League Premier Division)
- Leatherhead (from the Surrey Senior League)
- Luton Town 'A'
- Vickers Armstrong (Surrey)
- Windsor & Eton (from the Corinthian League)

Pos	Team	Pld	W	D	L	GF	GA	GD	Pts	Notes
1	Dagenham	30	24	3	3	95	28	+67	51	Founder members of Delphian League
2	Vickers Armstrong (Surrey)	30	22	3	5	98	50	+48	47	
3	Croydon Rovers	30	22	1	7	67	37	+30	45	Left the league
4	St Neots & District	30	18	4	8	87	47	+40	40	Joined the United Counties League
5	Luton Town 'A'	30	17	3	10	95	47	+48	37	
6	Windsor & Eton	30	16	4	10	70	61	+9	36	
7	Headington United Reserves	30	14	4	12	68	62	+6	32	
8	Brighton & Hove Albion 'A'	30	10	10	10	56	53	+3	30	
9	Leatherhead	30	12	3	15	53	67	−14	27	Founder members of Delphian League
10	Dunstable Town	30	11	2	17	62	83	−21	24	
11	Callender's Athletic	30	10	2	18	55	76	−21	22	
12	Twickenham	30	8	6	16	49	75	−26	22	
13	Chingford Town	30	8	5	17	51	71	−20	21	First team replaced the reserves mid-season, folded at end of season
14	Hastings United Reserves	30	6	5	19	38	72	−34	17	
15	Dickinson (Apsley)	30	5	5	20	60	136	−76	15	Dropped into the Herts County League
16	Hove United	30	5	4	21	35	74	−39	14	Left the league
–	Chipperfield	0	–	–	–	–	–	—	0	Withdrew during season, record expunged.

Source: Non-League Matters

== 1951–52 ==
Five new clubs joined the league in its third season;

- Horsham (from the Sussex County League)
- Millwall 'A'
- Skyways
- Tonbridge Reserves (from the London League Premier Division)
- Tottenham Hotspur 'A' (from the Eastern Counties League, although they also continued to play in the ECL for another three seasons)

Pos	Team	Pld	W	D	L	GF	GA	GD	Pts	Notes
1	Horsham	26	17	6	3	75	30	+45	40	
2	Tonbridge Reserves	26	16	7	3	90	34	+56	39	
3	Tottenham Hotspur 'A'	26	15	3	8	74	47	+27	33	
4	Headington United Reserves	26	13	5	8	72	58	+14	31	
5	Skyways	26	14	1	11	54	56	−2	29	Left the league
6	Windsor & Eton	26	12	4	10	76	58	+18	28	
7	Vickers Armstrong (Surrey)	26	9	8	9	64	72	−8	26	
8	Luton Town 'A'	26	12	1	13	83	79	+4	25	
9	Hastings United Reserves	26	9	7	10	49	57	−8	25	
10	Dunstable Town	26	11	2	13	48	66	−18	24	
11	Twickenham	26	8	5	13	53	71	−18	21	
12	Brighton & Hove Albion 'A'	26	8	3	15	54	72	−18	19	
13	Millwall 'A'	26	5	6	15	49	79	−30	16	Left the league
14	Callender's Athletic	26	3	2	21	32	94	−62	8	

Source: Non-League Matters

== 1952–53 ==
Four new clubs joined the league for its fourth season;

- Haywards Heath (from the Sussex County League)
- Newbury Town
- Southwick (from the Sussex County League)
- West Ham United 'A' (from the Eastern Counties League, although they also continued to play in the ECL for another four season)

Pos	Team	Pld	W	D	L	GF	GA	GD	Pts	Notes
1	Tonbridge Reserves	30	22	3	5	88	42	+46	47	
2	Windsor & Eton	30	19	6	5	91	53	+38	44	
3	Tottenham Hotspur 'A'	30	17	5	8	82	44	+38	39	
4	Newbury Town	30	17	5	8	96	57	+39	39	
5	Haywards Heath	30	14	8	8	59	48	+11	36	
6	Brighton & Hove Albion 'A'	30	16	2	12	78	59	+19	34	
7	Dunstable Town	30	15	3	12	70	66	+4	33	
8	Hastings United Reserves	30	13	6	11	83	69	+14	32	
9	Luton Town 'A'	30	14	4	12	80	70	+10	32	
10	Horsham	30	13	4	13	75	64	+11	30	
11	Headington United Reserves	30	11	8	11	55	54	+1	30	
12	West Ham United 'A'	30	10	7	13	55	69	−14	27	
13	Southwick	30	8	5	17	54	80	−26	21	
14	Vickers Armstrong (Surrey)	30	7	4	19	41	74	−33	18	
15	Twickenham	30	5	3	22	39	97	−58	13	Joined Parthenon League
16	Callender's Athletic	30	2	1	27	27	127	−100	5	Left the league

Source: Non-League Matters

== 1953–54 ==
Four new clubs joined the league prior to the start of the 1953–54 season;

- Chelsea 'A' (from the Eastern Counties League)
- Dartford Reserves (from the London League Premier Division)
- Guildford City Reserves (from the London League Premier Division)
- Gravesend & Northfleet Reserves (from the London League Premier Division)

Pos	Team	Pld	W	D	L	GF	GA	GD	Pts	Notes
1	Headington United Reserves	34	24	2	8	91	45	+46	50	
2	Hastings United Reserves	34	23	3	8	119	55	+64	49	
3	Luton Town 'A'	34	20	6	8	97	58	+39	46	
4	Tonbridge Reserves	34	19	5	10	94	63	+31	43	
5	Windsor & Eton	34	19	5	10	93	76	+17	43	
6	Guildford City Reserves	34	14	10	10	71	59	+12	38	
7	Tottenham Hotspur 'A'	34	16	5	13	73	67	+6	37	Left the league
8	Gravesend & Northfleet Reserves	34	12	11	11	56	52	+4	35	
9	Chelsea 'A'	34	13	9	12	46	55	−9	35	
10	Brighton & Hove Albion 'A'	34	14	5	15	58	65	−7	33	
11	Dunstable Town	34	13	5	16	83	111	−28	31	
12	Newbury Town	34	9	11	14	71	80	−9	29	
13	Horsham	34	11	6	17	59	63	−4	28	
14	Dartford Reserves	34	10	7	17	53	64	−11	27	
15	Vickers Armstrong (Surrey)	34	7	11	16	38	71	−33	25	
16	West Ham United 'A'	34	9	6	19	56	84	−28	24	
17	Haywards Heath	34	7	7	20	52	97	−45	21	
18	Southwick	34	6	6	22	37	82	−45	18	Joined Sussex County League

Source: Non-League Matters

== 1954–55 ==
One new club joined the league prior to the start of the 1954–55 season;

- Wokingham Town

Pos	Team	Pld	W	D	L	GF	GA	GD	Pts	Notes
1	Chelsea 'A'	32	22	5	5	116	46	+70	49	
2	Gravesend & Northfleet Reserves	32	21	4	7	68	38	+30	46	
3	Newbury Town	32	21	2	9	77	47	+30	44	
4	Dartford Reserves	32	20	3	9	73	45	+28	43	
5	Tonbridge Reserves	32	17	8	7	74	45	+29	42	
6	Dunstable Town	32	19	3	10	96	81	+15	41	
7	Guildford City Reserves	32	18	4	10	82	53	+29	40	
8	Hastings United Reserves	32	16	5	11	90	56	+34	37	
9	Horsham	32	12	10	10	55	51	+4	34	
10	Brighton & Hove Albion 'A'	32	13	6	13	82	74	+8	32	
11	Luton Town 'A'	32	12	3	17	66	103	−37	27	
12	Headington United Reserves	32	10	5	17	47	51	−4	25	
13	Windsor & Eton	32	10	2	20	58	103	−45	22	
14	Haywards Heath	32	8	5	19	69	99	−30	21	
15	Wokingham Town	32	8	4	20	53	88	−35	20	
16	West Ham United 'A'	32	6	1	25	36	85	−49	13	
17	Vickers Armstrong (Surrey)	32	3	2	27	26	103	−77	8	Left the league

Source: Non-League Matters

== 1955–56 ==
One new club joined the league prior to the start of the 1955–56 season;

- Bedford Town Reserves (from the United Counties League Division One)

Pos	Team	Pld	W	D	L	GF	GA	GD	Pts	Notes
1	Hastings United Reserves	32	26	2	4	97	42	+55	54	
2	Chelsea 'A'	32	25	3	4	111	30	+81	53	
3	Headington United Reserves	32	21	1	10	105	41	+64	43	
4	Dartford Reserves	32	19	5	8	72	44	+28	43	
5	Bedford Town Reserves	32	19	4	9	90	49	+41	42	
6	Gravesend & Northfleet Reserves	32	18	4	10	70	49	+21	40	Left the league
7	Tonbridge Reserves	32	15	5	12	78	57	+21	35	
8	Newbury Town	32	13	5	14	70	64	+6	31	
9	Guildford City Reserves	32	12	5	15	66	76	−10	29	
10	Dunstable Town	32	13	2	17	85	84	+1	28	
11	Luton Town 'A'	32	9	6	17	52	73	−21	24	
12	Horsham	32	11	2	19	55	105	−50	24	
13	Haywards Heath	32	9	6	17	50	103	−53	24	
14	West Ham United 'A'	32	7	9	16	55	75	−20	23	
15	Brighton & Hove Albion 'A'	32	8	5	19	48	71	−23	21	
16	Windsor & Eton	32	6	4	22	45	108	−63	16	
17	Wokingham Town	32	6	2	24	49	127	−78	14	

Source: Non-League Matters

== 1956–57 ==
Two new clubs joined the league prior to the start of the 1956–57 season;

- Crawley (from the Sussex County League Division Two)
- Eastbourne United (from the Sussex County League Division One)

Pos	Team	Pld	W	D	L	GF	GA	GD	Pts	Notes
1	Chelsea 'A'	34	22	5	7	106	38	+68	49	
2	Bedford Town Reserves	34	20	7	7	113	64	+49	47	
3	Tonbridge Reserves	34	21	5	8	83	62	+21	47	
4	Hastings United Reserves	34	19	8	7	129	63	+66	46	
5	Luton Town 'A'	34	20	4	10	97	67	+30	44	
6	Newbury Town	34	17	7	10	75	56	+19	41	
7	West Ham United 'A'	34	16	5	13	83	66	+17	37	
8	Dartford Reserves	34	17	3	14	64	60	+4	37	
9	Headington United Reserves	34	15	5	14	71	66	+5	35	
10	Guildford City Reserves	34	15	5	14	71	69	+2	35	
11	Eastbourne United	34	14	6	14	72	67	+5	34	
12	Windsor & Eton	34	13	4	17	62	98	−36	30	
13	Dunstable Town	34	10	7	17	72	90	−18	27	
14	Crawley	34	9	7	18	61	75	−14	25	
15	Wokingham Town	34	7	7	20	69	109	−40	21	Joined the Delphian League
16	Haywards Heath	34	9	3	22	42	100	−58	21	
17	Brighton & Hove Albion 'A'	34	8	3	23	46	105	−59	19	
18	Horsham	34	3	11	20	50	111	−61	17	Joined the Corinthian League

Source: Non-League Matters

== 1957–58 ==
Two new clubs joined for the 1957–58 season;

- Didcot Town (from the Hellenic League Premier Division)
- Fulham 'A'

Pos	Team	Pld	W	D	L	GF	GA	GD	Pts	Notes
1	Chelsea 'A'	34	28	3	3	107	34	+73	59	
2	Tonbridge Reserves	34	21	8	5	102	58	+44	50	
3	Hastings United Reserves	34	19	6	9	90	54	+36	44	
4	Dartford Reserves	34	17	7	10	98	71	+27	41	
5	Bedford Town Reserves	34	16	8	10	73	59	+14	40	
6	Dunstable Town	34	16	7	11	77	64	+13	39	
7	Luton Town 'A'	34	15	8	11	82	71	+11	38	
8	Headington United Reserves	34	17	2	15	73	70	+3	36	
9	Newbury Town	34	14	8	12	71	74	−3	36	
10	West Ham United 'A'	34	14	6	14	69	67	+2	34	
11	Crawley	34	12	7	15	70	75	−5	31	Changed name to Crawley Town
12	Guildford City Reserves	34	13	5	16	53	62	−9	31	
13	Haywards Heath	34	12	4	18	58	69	−11	28	
14	Windsor & Eton	34	11	3	20	51	110	−59	25	
15	Fulham 'A'	34	8	7	19	51	79	−28	23	
16	Didcot Town	34	8	6	20	60	92	−32	22	
17	Eastbourne United	34	8	3	23	47	81	−34	19	
18	Brighton & Hove Albion 'A'	34	7	2	25	39	81	−42	16	

Source: Non-League Matters

== 1958–59 ==
One new club joined the league for the 1958–59 season;

- Arsenal 'A'

Pos	Team	Pld	W	D	L	GF	GA	GD	Pts
1	Arsenal 'A'	36	25	6	5	118	51	+67	56
2	Chelsea 'A'	36	26	3	7	109	35	+74	55
3	Tonbridge Reserves	36	22	8	6	103	58	+45	52
4	Brighton & Hove Albion 'A'	36	18	7	11	71	61	+10	43
5	Dunstable Town	36	17	5	14	78	64	+14	39
6	Newbury Town	36	16	7	13	64	60	+4	39
7	Hastings United Reserves	36	16	6	14	68	64	+4	38
8	Haywards Heath	36	13	10	13	61	62	−1	36
9	Headington United Reserves	36	13	10	13	73	83	−10	36
10	Guildford City Reserves	36	16	4	16	69	80	−11	36
11	Bedford Town Reserves	36	12	9	15	67	83	−16	33
12	West Ham United 'A'	36	14	4	18	73	73	0	32
13	Fulham 'A'R	36	13	6	17	72	77	−5	32
14	Crawley Town	36	12	7	17	65	86	−21	31
15	Luton Town 'A'	36	12	6	18	72	74	−2	30
16	Didcot Town	36	8	14	14	53	61	−8	30
17	Eastbourne United	36	10	7	19	54	69	−15	27
18	Dartford Reserves	36	8	6	22	62	127	−65	22
19	Windsor & Eton	36	5	7	24	46	110	−64	17

Source: Non-League Matters

== 1959–60 ==
One new club joined the league for the 1959–60 season;

- Canterbury City (from the Kent League Division One)

Pos	Team	Pld	W	D	L	GF	GA	GD	Pts	Notes
1	Luton Town 'A'	38	24	6	8	100	61	+39	54	
2	Arsenal 'A'	38	21	9	8	108	52	+56	51	
3	Canterbury City	38	21	8	9	99	62	+37	50	Promoted to the Southern League Division One
4	Chelsea 'A'	38	21	6	11	104	55	+49	48	Left the league
5	Dunstable Town	38	22	5	11	94	66	+28	47 (Note: 2 points deducted?)	
6	Bedford Town Reserves	38	20	4	14	72	79	−7	44	
7	Guildford City Reserves	38	16	11	11	87	69	+18	43	
8	Headington United Reserves	38	18	5	15	79	87	−8	41	Changed name to Oxford United Reserves
9	Newbury Town	38	18	4	16	85	68	+17	40	
10	Tonbridge Reserves	38	14	12	12	60	53	+7	40	
11	Fulham 'A'	38	15	10	13	84	80	+4	40	Left the league
12	Eastbourne United	38	12	14	12	77	77	0	38	
13	Brighton & Hove Albion 'A'	38	14	6	18	67	86	−19	34	
14	West Ham United 'A'	38	14	5	19	78	102	−24	33	
15	Windsor & Eton	38	12	7	19	77	84	−7	31	Joined the Delphian League
16	Dartford Reserves	38	12	6	20	78	101	−23	30	
17	Hastings United Reserves	38	11	8	19	66	88	−22	30	
18	Didcot Town	38	10	3	25	71	101	−30	23	
19	Haywards Heath	38	8	5	25	52	103	−51	21	
20	Crawley Town	38	9	2	27	52	116	−64	20	

Source: Non-League Matters

== 1960–61 ==
Two new clubs joined the league for the 1960–61 season;

- Metropolitan Police (from the Spartan League)
- St Neots Town (from the Central Alliance)

Pos	Team	Pld	W	D	L	GF	GA	GD	Pts	Notes
1	Arsenal 'A'	34	26	3	5	141	40	+101	55	
2	St Neots Town	34	23	4	7	110	48	+62	50	
3	Eastbourne United	34	19	8	7	75	42	+33	46	
4	Bedford Town Reserves	34	21	4	9	79	56	+23	46	
5	Oxford United Reserves	34	20	5	9	105	64	+41	45	
6	Newbury Town	34	17	8	9	91	66	+25	42	
7	West Ham United 'A'	34	17	5	12	83	60	+23	39	
8	Dartford Reserves	34	18	3	13	81	66	+15	39	
9	Luton Town 'A'	34	14	7	13	72	57	+15	35	Left the league
10	Guildford City Reserves	34	14	7	13	69	72	−3	35	
11	Hastings United Reserves	34	15	5	14	70	78	−8	35	Left the league
12	Tonbridge Reserves	34	12	3	19	71	96	−25	27	
13	Didcot Town	34	11	3	20	62	86	−24	25	
14	Dunstable Town	34	8	9	17	68	103	−35	25	Joined United Counties League Division One
15	Metropolitan Police	34	9	5	20	49	82	−33	23	
16	Brighton & Hove Albion 'A'	34	7	6	21	45	93	−48	20	
17	Crawley Town	34	5	4	25	39	123	−84	14	
18	Haywards Heath	34	4	3	27	32	110	−78	11	Joined Sussex County League Division One

Source: Non-League Matters

== 1961–62 ==
Three new clubs joined the league for the 1961–62 season;

- Bexleyheath & Welling Reserves
- Rainham Town (from the Delphian League)
- Woodford Town (from the Delphian League)

Pos	Team	Pld	W	D	L	GF	GA	GD	Pts	Notes
1	Dartford Reserves	32	24	4	4	102	51	+51	52	
2	Arsenal 'A'	32	20	9	3	93	42	+51	49	
3	St Neots Town	32	19	7	6	88	42	+46	45	
4	Bexleyheath & Welling Reserves	32	18	7	7	81	63	+18	43	
5	Crawley Town	32	19	2	11	90	55	+35	40	
6	Guildford City Reserves	32	17	5	10	81	71	+10	39	
7	Oxford United Reserves	32	17	4	11	104	64	+40	38	
8	West Ham United 'A'	32	13	7	12	91	78	+13	33	
9	Bedford Town Reserves	32	11	7	14	75	60	+15	29	
10	Rainham Town	32	13	3	16	54	63	−9	29	
11	Didcot Town	32	11	6	15	68	80	−12	28	
12	Brighton & Hove Albion 'A'	32	11	5	16	58	73	−15	27	Left the league
13	Eastbourne United	32	11	5	16	59	76	−17	27	
14	Tonbridge Reserves	32	9	5	18	84	102	−18	23	
15	Newbury Town	32	8	3	21	42	93	−51	19	Joined Hellenic League Premier Division
16	Woodford Town	32	5	2	25	42	120	−78	12	
17	Metropolitan Police	32	4	3	25	33	112	−79	11	

Source: Non-League Matters

== 1962–63 ==
Two new clubs joined the league for the 1962–63 season;

- Gravesend & Northfleet Reserves
- Kettering Town Reserves (from the United Counties League Division One)

Pos	Team	Pld	W	D	L	GF	GA	GD	Pts	Notes
1	Arsenal 'A'	32	26	2	4	107	29	+78	54	
2	Oxford United Reserves	32	23	3	6	77	36	+41	49	
3	Kettering Town Reserves	32	21	5	6	102	47	+55	47	
4	Bedford Town Reserves	32	22	2	8	99	42	+57	46	
5	West Ham United 'A'	32	19	4	9	94	55	+39	42	
6	Crawley Town	32	19	4	9	82	49	+33	42	Promoted to the Southern League Division One
7	St Neots Town	32	18	2	12	93	70	+23	38	
8	Dartford Reserves	32	15	6	11	84	56	+28	36	
9	Tonbridge Reserves	32	13	5	14	78	80	−2	31	
10	Rainham Town	32	14	2	16	67	65	+2	30	
11	Guildford City Reserves	32	13	3	16	66	82	−16	29	
12	Eastbourne United	32	11	5	16	64	67	−3	27	
13	Bexleyheath & Welling Reserves	32	6	8	18	46	82	−36	20	Changed name to Bexley United Reserves
14	Woodford Town	32	8	3	21	41	95	−54	19	
15	Metropolitan Police	32	6	4	22	44	98	−54	16	
16	Gravesend & Northfleet Reserves	32	3	4	25	37	106	−69	10	Relegated to new Division Two
17	Didcot Town	32	3	2	27	26	148	−122	8	Joined Hellenic League Premier Division

Source: Non-League Matters

== 1963–64 ==
A second division was added for the 1963–64 season, with all the clubs in the division new apart from Gravesend & Northfleet Reserves. Six new clubs joined Division One;

- Cambridge City Reserves (from the Eastern Counties League)
- Charlton Athletic 'A'
- Chelmsford City Reserves (from the Eastern Counties League)
- Crawley Town Reserves
- Romford Reserves (from the Eastern Counties League)
- Tottenham Hotspur 'A' (from the Eastern Counties League)

Division One
Pos	Team	Pld	W	D	L	GF	GA	GD	Pts	Notes
1	Charlton Athletic 'A'	38	27	4	7	135	51	+84	58	
2	Chelmsford City Reserves	38	23	10	5	105	47	+58	56	
3	Tottenham Hotspur 'A'	38	25	3	10	122	60	+62	53	
4	Oxford United Reserves	38	19	13	6	104	50	+54	51	Left the league
5	Cambridge City Reserves	38	20	9	9	94	78	+16	49	
6	Woodford Town	38	20	7	11	92	67	+25	47	
7	Arsenal 'A'	38	18	9	11	80	57	+23	45	
8	Eastbourne United	38	16	10	12	72	60	+12	42	Joined Athenian League Division Two
9	West Ham United 'A'	38	18	6	14	95	82	+13	42	
10	St Neots Town	38	17	7	14	94	67	+27	41	
11	Guildford City Reserves	38	16	7	15	79	62	+17	39	
12	Romford Reserves	38	12	11	15	75	84	−9	35	
13	Kettering Town Reserves	38	12	7	19	78	98	−20	31	Left the league
14	Rainham Town	38	10	8	20	75	113	−38	28	Joined Athenian League Division Two
15	Dartford Reserves	38	12	4	22	61	102	−41	28	
16	Metropolitan Police	38	11	5	22	64	102	−38	27	
17	Bexley United Reserves	38	11	5	22	65	105	−40	27	
18	Bedford Town Reserves	38	9	7	22	68	108	−40	25	
19	Crawley Town Reserves	38	8	7	23	51	92	−41	23	Left the league
20	Tonbridge Reserves	38	5	3	30	38	162	−124	13	Left the league

Source: Non-League Matters

Division Two
Pos	Team	Pld	W	D	L	GF	GA	GD	Pts	Notes
1	Gillingham Reserves	28	26	1	1	132	28	+104	53	Promoted
2	Hastings United Reserves	28	16	5	7	71	44	+27	37	Left the league
3	Stevenage Town Reserves	28	18	0	10	72	46	+26	36	Promoted
4	Dover Reserves	28	12	7	9	61	50	+11	31	Left the league
5	Chertsey Town	28	13	5	10	85	82	+3	31	Promoted
6	Deal Town Reserves	28	12	6	10	60	57	+3	30	Left the league
7	Margate Reserves	28	13	3	12	68	48	+20	29	Left the league
8	Folkestone Town Reserves	28	11	6	11	57	62	−5	28	Left the league
9	Dunstable Town	28	11	6	11	41	53	−12	28	Promoted
10	Canterbury City Reserves	28	12	3	13	59	60	−1	27	Left the league
11	Sittingbourne Reserves	28	13	1	14	56	62	−6	27	Left the league
12	Gravesend & Northfleet Reserves	28	7	4	17	54	89	−35	18	Left the league
13	Ashford Town Reserves	28	5	6	17	31	68	−37	16	Left the league
14	Chingford	28	5	5	18	31	81	−50	15	Left the league
15	Ramsgate Athletic Reserves	28	6	2	20	44	92	−48	14	Left the league

Source: Non-League Matters

== 1964–65 ==
Division Two was disbanded after a single season, although four of its clubs stayed in the league and moved up to the single division. An additional four new clubs joined the league for the 1964–65 season;

- Bury Town (from the Eastern Counties League)
- Chatham Town (from the Aetolian League)
- Luton Town 'A'
- Wimbledon Reserves

Pos	Team	Pld	W	D	L	GF	GA	GD	Pts	Notes
1	Gillingham Reserves	42	31	4	7	149	58	+91	66	Left the league
2	Tottenham Hotspur 'A'	42	30	3	9	129	39	+90	63	
3	West Ham United 'A'	42	29	4	9	107	52	+55	62	
4	Bury Town	42	26	6	10	85	56	+29	58	
5	Arsenal 'A'	42	23	6	13	98	53	+45	52	
6	Wimbledon Reserves	42	23	6	13	100	76	+24	52	
7	Bedford Town Reserves	42	21	6	15	91	76	+15	48	
8	Woodford Town	42	19	9	14	94	93	+1	47	
9	Chatham Town	42	19	9	14	79	84	−5	47	
10	Chertsey Town	42	18	9	15	105	108	−3	45	
11	Chelmsford City Reserves	42	18	6	18	82	66	+16	42	
12	St Neots Town	42	13	14	15	66	66	0	40	
13	Dunstable Town	42	15	9	18	72	89	−17	39	Promoted to the Southern League Division One
14	Charlton Athletic 'A'	42	14	8	20	74	98	−24	36	
15	Guildford City Reserves	42	13	9	20	82	83	−1	35	Left the league
16	Romford Reserves	42	15	5	22	70	93	−23	35	Left the league
17	Dartford Reserves	42	10	11	21	91	112	−21	31	
18	Metropolitan Police	42	10	9	23	66	94	−28	29	
19	Cambridge City Reserves	42	9	10	23	59	108	−49	28	Joined Eastern Counties League
20	Luton Town 'A'	42	9	7	26	72	123	−51	25	Left the league
21	Stevenage Town Reserves	42	8	7	27	62	123	−61	23	
22	Bexley United Reserves	42	6	9	27	39	122	−83	21	Left the league

Source: Non-League Matters

== 1965–66 ==
Five new clubs joined the league for the 1965–66 season;

- Barnet Reserves
- Brentwood Town (from the Athenian League Division Two), changed their name from Brentwood & Warley
- Dunstable Town Reserves (from the Hellenic League Division One)
- Hatfield Town (from the Greater London League A Section)
- Sheppey United (from the Greater London League B Section)

Pos	Team	Pld	W	D	L	GF	GA	GD	Pts	Notes
1	Bury Town	36	29	5	2	108	27	+81	63	
2	Tottenham Hotspur 'A'	36	28	3	5	123	35	+88	59	
3	Brentwood Town	36	25	7	4	101	46	+55	57	
4	West Ham United 'A'	36	24	7	5	85	34	+51	55	
5	Arsenal 'A'	36	21	8	7	107	54	+53	50	
6	St Neots Town	36	21	5	10	83	62	+21	47	Joined United Counties League
7	Wimbledon Reserves	36	19	3	14	95	74	+21	41	
8	Chelmsford City Reserves	36	15	6	15	80	74	+6	36	
9	Woodford Town	36	17	2	17	64	84	−20	36	
10	Barnet Reserves	36	13	7	16	69	72	−3	33	
11	Sheppey United	36	13	7	16	63	88	−25	33	
12	Chatham Town	36	12	7	17	68	78	−10	31	
13	Metropolitan Police	36	13	4	19	75	67	+8	30	
14	Dartford Reserves	36	9	5	22	61	105	−44	23	Left the league
15	Stevenage Town Reserves	36	8	7	21	50	91	−41	23	
16	Bedford Town Reserves	36	8	4	24	64	108	−44	20	
17	Hatfield Town	36	6	6	24	58	121	−63	18	
18	Chertsey Town	36	5	7	24	54	109	−55	17	Left the league
19	Dunstable Town Reserves	36	3	6	27	43	122	−79	12	Left the league
–	Charlton Athletic 'A'	0	0	0	0	0	0	0	0	Resigned mid-season, record expunged

Source: Non-League Matters

== 1966–67 ==
Three new clubs joined the league for the 1966–67 season;

- Cray Wanderers (from the Greater London League Premier Division)
- Crittall Athletic (from the Greater London League Premier Division)
- Hillingdon Borough Reserves (from the Hellenic League Premier Division)

Pos	Team	Pld	W	D	L	GF	GA	GD	Pts	Notes
1	Tottenham Hotspur 'A'	32	20	6	6	102	45	+57	46	
2	Arsenal 'A'	32	20	5	7	91	41	+50	45	
3	Brentwood Town	32	20	4	8	75	41	+34	44	Promoted to the Southern League Division One
4	Bury Town	32	16	8	8	73	46	+27	40	
5	West Ham United 'A'	32	15	9	8	73	36	+37	39	
6	Hatfield Town	32	16	7	9	67	47	+20	39	
7	Sheppey United	32	14	9	9	62	55	+7	37	
8	Bedford Town Reserves	32	13	8	11	60	46	+14	34	
9	Cray Wanderers	32	14	6	12	60	75	−15	34	
10	Wimbledon Reserves	32	15	3	14	65	73	−8	33	
11	Metropolitan Police	32	11	9	12	42	48	−6	31	
12	Crittall Athletic	32	11	3	18	40	62	−22	25	
13	Woodford Town	32	10	3	19	47	78	−31	23	Left the league
14	Chelmsford City Reserves	32	7	7	18	46	77	−31	21	
15	Chatham Town	32	8	5	19	35	69	−34	21	
16	Hillingdon Borough Reserves	32	6	5	21	29	73	−44	17	Left the league
17	Stevenage Town Reserves	32	5	5	22	43	98	−55	15	Left the league
–	Barnet Reserves	0	0	0	0	0	0	0	0	Resigned mid-season, record expunged

Source: Non-League Matters

== 1967–68 ==
One new club joined the league for the 1967–68 season;

- Brentwood Town Reserves

Pos	Team	Pld	W	D	L	GF	GA	GD	Pts	Notes
1	Chelmsford City Reserves	26	17	4	5	56	25	+31	38	
2	Bury Town	26	15	7	4	56	26	+30	37	
3	Tottenham Hotspur 'A'	26	15	3	8	53	40	+13	33	
4	Cray Wanderers	26	12	8	6	50	35	+15	32	
5	Bedford Town Reserves	26	15	1	10	59	42	+17	31	
6	Metropolitan Police	26	13	3	10	66	61	+5	29	
7	Hatfield Town	26	12	2	12	49	45	+4	26	
8	Arsenal 'A'	26	9	6	11	46	48	−2	24	
9	West Ham United 'A'	26	10	4	12	39	41	−2	24	
10	Wimbledon Reserves	26	8	6	12	35	46	−11	22	
11	Sheppey United	26	7	6	13	43	68	−25	20	
12	Chatham Town	26	6	7	13	23	46	−23	19	Joined Kent League
13	Crittall Athletic	26	7	4	15	36	49	−13	18	Renamed Braintree & Crittall Athletic
14	Brentwood Town Reserves	26	2	7	17	18	57	−39	11	Left the league

Source: Non-League Matters

== 1968–69 ==
Four new clubs joined the league for the 1968–69 season:

- Bletchley Town (from the United Counties League Division One)
- Romford Reserves
- Stevenage Athletic
- Wellingborough Town (from the United Counties League Division One)

Pos	Team	Pld	W	D	L	GF	GA	GD	Pts	Notes
1	Bury Town	30	20	3	7	55	23	+32	43	
2	Tottenham Hotspur 'A'	30	17	8	5	68	38	+30	42	Left the league
3	Bletchley Town	30	16	6	8	47	25	+22	38	
4	Metropolitan Police	30	16	5	9	72	52	+20	37	
5	Braintree & Crittall Athletic	30	12	11	7	36	26	+10	35	
6	West Ham United 'A'	30	14	6	10	50	41	+9	34	
7	Wellingborough Town	30	15	3	12	57	49	+8	33	
8	Chelmsford City Reserves	30	11	9	10	56	45	+11	31	Left the league
9	Stevenage Athletic	30	11	9	10	50	44	+6	31	
10	Romford Reserves	30	11	9	10	59	60	−1	31	
11	Sheppey United	30	12	7	11	53	54	−1	31	
12	Cray Wanderers	30	11	5	14	49	49	0	27	
13	Arsenal 'A'	30	9	4	17	34	59	−25	22	Left the league
14	Hatfield Town	30	4	9	17	37	65	−28	17	
15	Wimbledon Reserves	30	6	3	21	30	70	−40	15	Left the league
16	Bedford Town Reserves	30	5	3	22	28	81	−53	13	

Source: Non-League Matters

== 1969–70 ==
Three new clubs joined the league for the start of the 1969–70 season;

- Brentwood Town Reserves (rejoined after a season's absence)
- Epping Town (from the Greater London League Division One)
- Oxford United 'A'

Pos	Team	Pld	W	D	L	GF	GA	GD	Pts	Notes
1	Wellingborough Town	28	18	4	6	67	32	+35	40	Joined West Midlands (Regional) League Premier Division
2	Stevenage Athletic	28	15	9	4	54	22	+32	39	Promoted to the Southern League Division One
3	West Ham United 'A'	28	14	8	6	48	24	+24	36	
4	Metropolitan Police	28	13	8	7	50	39	+11	34	
5	Bletchley Town	28	12	9	7	51	38	+13	33	
6	Bedford Town Reserves	28	10	9	9	30	26	+4	29	
7	Bury Town	28	11	6	11	48	39	+9	28	
8	Sheppey United	28	10	7	11	50	45	+5	27	
9	Romford Reserves	28	9	8	11	37	43	−6	26	
10	Hatfield Town	28	9	5	14	47	61	−14	23	
11	Braintree & Crittall Athletic	28	7	9	12	32	48	−16	23	Joined Eastern Counties League
12	Oxford United 'A'	28	9	4	15	43	63	−20	21 (Note: 1 point deducted?)	Left the league
13	Cray Wanderers	28	8	5	15	34	52	−18	21	
14	Brentwood Town Reserves	28	6	8	14	25	56	−31	20	Left the league
15	Epping Town	28	6	7	15	40	68	−28	19	

Source: Non-League Matters

== 1970–71 ==
Two new clubs joined the league for the start of the 1970–71 season;

- Woodford Town (rejoined after three season's absence)
- Chelmsford City Reserves (rejoined after a season's absence)

At the end of the season four clubs moved up to the Southern League as it added a new second tier division, splitting the previous Division One into Division One North and Division One South.

Pos	Team	Pld	W	D	L	GF	GA	GD	Pts	Notes
1	Epping Town	22	14	5	3	58	36	+22	33	Joined Metropolitan–London League Division One
2	Bury Town	22	13	4	5	45	30	+15	30	Promotion to Southern League Division One North
3	Bletchley Town	22	13	3	6	49	21	+28	29	Promotion to Southern League Division One North
4	Cray Wanderers	22	12	3	7	45	36	+9	27	Joined Metropolitan–London League Division One
5	Metropolitan Police	22	9	7	6	44	27	+17	25	Promotion to Southern League Division One South
6	Chelmsford City Reserves	22	9	7	6	55	38	+17	25	Left the league
7	Woodford Town	22	8	7	7	30	32	−2	23	Promotion to Southern League Division One South
8	Sheppey United	22	8	3	11	33	37	−4	19	Joined Metropolitan–London League Division One
9	West Ham United 'A'	22	6	4	12	22	37	−15	16	Joined South East Counties League as a youth team
10	Bedford Town Reserves	22	4	5	13	26	49	−23	13	Left the league
11	Romford Reserves	22	2	9	11	24	49	−25	13	Left the league
12	Hatfield Town	22	4	3	15	32	71	−39	11	Joined Metropolitan–London League Division One

Source: Non-League Matters
