= Len Shackleton =

English footballer (1922–2000)

Personal information
- Full name: Leonard Francis Shackleton
- Date of birth: 3 May 1922
- Place of birth: Bradford, England
- Date of death: 28 November 2000 (aged 78)
- Place of death: Grange-over-Sands, England
- Height: 5 ft 9 in (1.75 m)
- Positions: Inside forward; outside forward

Youth career
- 1936–1938: Bradford Park Avenue
- 1936–1938: → Kippax United (loan)
- 1938–1939: Arsenal
- 1938–1939: → Enfield (loan)
- 1939: London Paper Mills

Senior career*
Years	Team	Apps	(Gls)
1940–1946	Bradford Park Avenue	7	(4)
1946–1948	Newcastle United	57	(26)
1948–1957	Sunderland	320	(97)
Total		384	(127)

International career
1935–1936	England Schoolboys	3	(2)
1948–1954	England	5	(1)
- * Club domestic league appearances and goals

Leonard Francis Shackleton (3 May 1922 – 28 November 2000) was an English footballer. Known as the "Clown Prince of Football", he is generally regarded as one of English football's finest ever entertainers. He also played cricket in the Minor Counties for Northumberland.

Able to play at inside forward or outside forward, he scored 134 goals in 427 league and cup appearances in just over 11 seasons in the Football League, and before that scored 171 goals in 209 league and cup appearances during wartime football. His ball control skills made him one of the most talented players in the country, but his individualism and outspoken nature limited him to only five England caps in a six-year international career. He also never won a trophy or league title.

Born in Bradford, he spent his teenage years before World War II with Bradford Park Avenue, Kippax United, Arsenal, Enfield, and London Paper Mills, before he turned professional at Bradford Park Avenue in 1940. He spent the war assembling aircraft radios and playing for Bradford PA, and was sold on to Second Division rivals Newcastle United for a £13,000 fee in October 1946. He scored six goals on his Newcastle debut, but fell out with the club's directors, and was sold on to Sunderland for a British transfer record fee of £20,050 in February 1948. He scored 97 goals in 320 First Division matches for the club, with the closest he came to a trophy being the 1949–50 season when Sunderland finished third in the league, and when they reached the semi-finals of the FA Cup in 1955 and in 1956. He retired due to an ankle injury in 1957, and became a sports journalist.

== Club career ==
Leonard Francis Shackleton was born in Bradford, England on 3 May 1922 to Leonard and Irene Shackleton; his father was a self-employed painter and decorator and his mother was a housewife. He was the elder brother to Irene and John; John went on to sign for Sunderland, though never played a first team game and quit the game to become a chiropodist and tennis coach. Shackleton attended Carlton High Grammar school, and became the first Bradford schoolboy to represent England schoolboys when he scored two goals in a 6–2 victory over Wales schoolboys; also in the team that day was future Sunderland teammate Dickie Davis.

=== Early career ===
Despite his family being keen Bradford City supporters, Shackleton signed amateur forms with Bradford Park Avenue after being signed by manager Billy Hardy. Bradford PA permitted him to play for Kippax United in the Leeds League. Arsenal's secretary-manager George Allison heard of Shackleton's talents, and drove to Bradford to sign him to amateur forms in 1938. Arsenal permitted him to play for Enfield in the Athenian League, and he in fact only represented Arsenal twice in reserve team fixtures in the Southern League. He was released by Arsenal in May 1939 and told by Allison that he was too small to succeed as a footballer, and should find other employment. Following this disappointment he took a job at London Paper Mills in Dartford, and turned out for the factory's works team in the Kent League.

=== Bradford Park Avenue ===
Shackleton returned to his hometown upon hearing of the outbreak of World War II and took up employment assembling aircraft radios for GEC, at which point he rejoined Bradford Park Avenue as an amateur after being invited to the Park Avenue Stadium by manager David Steele. He turned professional at the club shortly before Christmas 1940 and received a £10 signing-on fee, which the cash-strapped club had to pay in instalments. On Christmas morning he played for Bradford PA, then guested for Huddersfield Town in the afternoon, and scored in both matches. In the wartime leagues he scored a total of 171 goals in league and cup 209 appearances for Bradford PA. He became a Bevin Boy in order to avoid his call-up for national service in 1945 as he did not want to miss the resumption of the Football League, but found the experience of coal mining terrifying and gruelling. He began to avoid his shifts in the pits, and so was called into the Royal Air Force, where he served the remainder of his national service. He scored four goals in seven Second Division matches at the start of the 1946–47 season, but left the club in October 1946 after growing tired of heckling from his own supporters who did not appreciate his individualist style.

=== Newcastle United ===
In October 1946, Shackleton was sold to Second Division side Newcastle United for a £13,000 fee. He was sold as a direct replacement for Albert Stubbins, who had been sold from Newcastle to Liverpool for the same fee. He scored six goals on his debut in Newcastle's 13–0 defeat of Newport County at St James' Park on 5 October, with three of his goals coming within the space of just 155 seconds. However his return to Park Avenue in his fourth game for Newcastle was not a happy one, as he had a penalty saved by former teammate Chick Farr in a 2–1 defeat to Bradford PA. The "Magpies" boasted a devastating forward line of Jackie Milburn, Roy Bentley, Charlie Wayman, Shackleton, and Tommy Pearson, and totalled 95 league goals in the 1946–47 season, though their tally of 62 goals conceded and 13 defeats left the club having to settle for fifth place. They did though reach the semi-finals of the FA Cup, where they were beaten 4–0 by Charlton Athletic. After the semi-final game he and club captain Joe Harvey went on strike over housing issues; the club's board eventually relented and granted Shackleton the house they had initially promised him, though to save face told the press that Harvey and Shackleton had been in the wrong and had apologised. He further came into conflict with the club at Christmas 1947, when he and goalkeeper Jack Fairbrother refused to join the squad on a scouting party on opponents Charlton Athletic, who they faced later that season in the third round of the FA Cup. Unhappy with the club, he handed in a transfer request, which was granted.

"...those people upstairs, and whatnot – I never hit it off with... the fans are so brilliant at Newcastle that I feel guilty when I call them (names). But I'm not calling the fans, I'm calling the club... I've no bias against Newcastle – I don't care who beats them!"

— Shackleton liked the Geordie people but felt that Newcastle United was not a well run club.

=== Sunderland ===
In February 1948, Shackleton was sold to Newcastle's rivals Sunderland for a British transfer fee record of £20,050. He was one of a number of a squad full of big name players signed by the club for a total outlay of around £250,000 during the post-war era, which earned Sunderland the nickname of the 'Bank of England' club. However Shackleton made his debut in a 5–1 defeat to Derby County at the Baseball Ground, and Sunderland finished just four points above the relegation zone – at that time the club had never been relegated out of the First Division. He later admitted that the players were more a collection of talented individuals than a true team, and that "it takes time to harness and control a team of thoroughbreds. It took time to achieve the blend at Roker Park". Shackleton and centre-forward Trevor Ford would never build any kind of relationship on or off the pitch however, and Ford once threatened to never play in the same Sunderland team as Shackleton until he was forced to back down by manager Bill Murray. Ford was sold on to Cardiff City in November 1953.

Shackleton never won any honours with Sunderland, the closest he came to doing so being a third-place finish in 1949–50, when they finished one point behind champions Portsmouth. Shackleton felt that a surprise home defeat to Manchester City on 15 April was both decisive and galling, as teammate Jack Stelling twice missed a penalty in a 2–1 loss. Sunderland lost fewer games than any other team in the 1954–55 season, but still ended up four points behind champions Chelsea. They also reached the semi-finals of the FA Cup in 1955 and in 1956, losing 1–0 to Manchester City at Villa Park and then 3–0 to Birmingham City at Hillsborough. He injured his ankle on the opening day of the 1957–58 season, and announced his retirement shortly afterwards. This meant he played only 45 minutes for new manager Alan Brown, who had a reputation as a tough taskmaster. The club were reluctant to grant him a benefit match, but relented after Shackleton threatened to tell the FA about illegal payments the club had made.

== International career ==
Shackleton won his first full cap for England in a 0–0 draw with Denmark on 26 September 1948. He was dropped and replaced by Stan Pearson for England's next game, before making a surprise return in a 1–0 win over Wales at Villa Park on 10 November 1948. His third cap came again against Wales, in a 4–1 victory in Cardiff on 15 October 1949. He then had to wait five years for his fourth cap, in which time the England selectors had tried 17 different players at inside-forward, with limited success. Selectors had always viewed the rebellious Shackleton with distrust, and one selector who was challenged over Shackleton's continued absence in the England team told a journalist that "we play at Wembley, not the London Palladium." He made his return again against Wales, in a 3–2 victory at Wembley Stadium. He put in his finest performance however in his final England appearance, scoring with a chipped goal in a 3–1 win over the then World Champions West Germany on 1 December 1954. He later wrote that the goal was "my most memorable scoring effort in a lifetime of soccer... I felt a keen sense of satisfaction – not because the goal made our victory over Germany certain, but because I had decided exactly how to go about scoring it long before the chance presented itself. Anticipation and fulfilment."

== Style of play ==
Journalist Malcolm Hartley, wrote of Shackleton: "Apart from the adhesive ball control and breathtaking body swerve, Shack could hit a ball. His slender legs could crack the ball like a Bofors gun." One of his contemporaries remarked: "Once in possession, and few can match his dexterity at bringing the ball under control, the ball becomes his slave. All the skills of inside forward play – dribbling, feinting, correct positioning and accurate passing are his to command."

A showman who liked to entertain the crowd, he was able to cut the ball with sufficient spin that it would roll towards an opponent only to stop and then return to him as though on a string. He was also adept at back heeling penalty kicks into the goal. He would rarely track back and defend however, and antics were sometimes criticised as "unsportsman-like". On one occasion, 2–1 up against Arsenal with 5 minutes to go, he dribbled the ball into The Gunners' penalty area before putting his foot on it, pretending to comb his hair while looking at his watch. Other examples include mocking opposition full-backs by playing one-twos with the corner flag, literally sitting on the ball to torment defenders who could not dispossess him, and teasing a beaten goalkeeper by putting his foot on the ball on the goal line. Sunderland teammate Trevor Ford wrote in his autobiography that: "where did it [Shackleton's antics] get us? Precisely nowhere. The result was that when he did make a move, the opposing defence was in position and the attack broke down. Time and again when I thought Shack was going to slip a goalscoring pass to me he would veer off". However Billy Bingham defended Shackleton by noting that Ford had poor positional skills.

== Cricket career ==
While playing for Sunderland, Shackleton played cricket for Wearmouth Colliery and for Northumberland in the 1948 Minor Counties Championship. His genius and humour was also evident on the cricket field. At Wearmouth, he would entertain the crowd by pretending to miss slip catches, then looking behind him as if the ball had gone to the boundary, before producing the ball from his pocket. While at Sunderland he played for Wearmouth Colliery in the Durham Senior League. He also played cricket for Lidget Green in the Bradford League, and for Northumberland in the Minor Counties League.

== Journalism career and later life ==
Shackleton became a sports journalist after retiring as a footballer. He had been an outspoken critic of the football establishment during his playing career, particularly so of the maximum wage rule. He used his nickname, The Clown Prince of Soccer, for his 1956 autobiography. One chapter of that book was "The Average Director's Knowledge of Football". It consisted of a single blank page. The book proved to be immensely popular, and ran into five editions within three months.

Shackleton, who had also been a barber during his playing career, had three sons with his wife Marjorie. He moved to Grange-over-Sands in Cumbria on retirement and wrote Return of the Clown Prince with his son Roger. He had a heart attack in August 2000 and died on 28 November that year, aged 78.

== Statistics ==
=== Club statistics ===
Appearances and goals by club, season and competition
Club	Season	League			FA Cup		Total	
Club	Season	Division	Apps	Goals	Apps	Goals	Apps	Goals
Bradford Park Avenue	1945–46	–	0	0	8	1	8	1
Bradford Park Avenue	1946–47	Second Division	7	4	0	0	7	4
Bradford Park Avenue	Total		7	4	8	1	15	5
Newcastle United	1946–47	Second Division	32	19	6	3	38	22
Newcastle United	1947–48	Second Division	25	7	1	0	26	7
Newcastle United	Total		57	26	7	3	64	29
Sunderland	1947–48	First Division	14	4	0	0	14	4
Sunderland	1948–49	First Division	39	8	2	0	41	8
Sunderland	1949–50	First Division	40	14	2	2	42	16
Sunderland	1950–51	First Division	30	6	4	0	34	6
Sunderland	1951–52	First Division	41	22	2	0	43	22
Sunderland	1952–53	First Division	31	6	3	0	34	6
Sunderland	1953–54	First Division	38	14	1	0	39	14
Sunderland	1954–55	First Division	32	8	6	1	38	9
Sunderland	1955–56	First Division	28	7	6	0	34	7
Sunderland	1956–57	First Division	26	8	2	0	28	8
Sunderland	1957–58	First Division	1	0	0	0	1	0
Sunderland	Total		320	97	28	3	348	100
Career Total			384	127	43	7	427	134

=== International statistics ===
England national team
Year	Apps	Goals
1948	2	0
1949	1	0
1954	2	1
Total	5	1
