= 1963–64 Spartan League =

Spartan League
- Season: 1963–64

The 1963–64 Spartan League season was the 46th in the history of Spartan League. The league consisted of 18 teams.

== League table ==
Spartan League
- Season: 1963–64
- Champions: Croydon Amateurs
- Promoted: Croydon Amateurs; Cheshunt
- Relegated: None

The division featured 18 teams, 16 from last season and 2 new teams:

- Croydon Amateurs, from Surrey Senior League
- Willesden, from Aetolian League

Pos	Team	Pld	W	D	L	GF	GA	GR	Pts	Promotion
1	Croydon Amateurs (C, P)	34	29	2	3	123	28	4.393	60	Promotion to Athenian League Division Two
2	Boreham Wood	34	21	7	6	88	45	1.956	49	
3	Petters Sports	34	22	4	8	75	47	1.596	48	
4	Hoddesdon Town	34	19	9	6	86	45	1.911	47	
5	Cheshunt (P)	34	22	2	10	105	38	2.763	46	Promotion to Athenian League Division Two
6	Chalfont St. Peter	34	17	7	10	77	62	1.242	41	
7	Vauxhall Motors	34	15	9	10	68	39	1.744	39	
8	Molesey	34	12	8	14	60	72	0.833	32	
9	Wood Green Town	34	13	5	16	77	73	1.055	31	
10	Willesden	34	11	9	14	53	65	0.815	31	
11	Staines Town	34	13	4	17	71	83	0.855	30	
12	Ruislip Manor	34	11	8	15	68	80	0.850	30	
13	Marlow	34	11	6	17	66	76	0.868	28	
14	Huntley & Palmers	34	8	9	17	38	84	0.452	25	
15	Crown and Manor	34	8	6	20	46	91	0.505	22	
16	Tring Town	34	5	9	20	38	101	0.376	19	
17	Kingsbury Town	34	7	4	23	46	88	0.523	18	
18	Rayners Lane	34	6	4	24	43	111	0.387	16	

Rules for classification: 1) points; 2) goal ratio.
(C) Champions; (P) Promoted
