= SUFC =

SUFC can refer to one of the following:

== Australia ==
- Sydney University Fencing Club, part of the University of Sydney's sporting body
- Sydney University Football Club

== England ==
- Saltash United F.C.
- Saltdean United F.C.
- Sandbach United F.C.
- Scunthorpe United F.C.
- Sheffield United F.C.
- Skelmersdale United F.C.
- Southend United F.C.
- Spalding United F.C.
- Stambridge United F.C.
- Sutton United F.C.

== Northern Ireland ==
- Saintfield United F.C.
- Shankill United F.C.

== Other places ==
- Seoul United FC, Korea
- Shaanxi Union F.C., China
- Supersport United F.C., South Africa
