= Aetolian League (football) =

- Founded: 1959
- First season: 1959–60
- Folded: 1964
- Country: England
- Divisions: Two
- Number of clubs: Lowest: 12 (1963–64); Highest: 14 (1959–60, 1961–62)
- Feeder to: Southern League
- Domestic cup(s): FA Cup
- League cup(s): League Cup
- Most championships: Ford United (2)

The Aetolian League was a short-lived football league in the south east of England. It was established in 1959 after the Kent League folded, leaving a number of clubs without a league to play in. Seven of the founder members were from the Kent League and four from the London League. The league had two divisions, although Division Two consisted mainly of the reserve teams of clubs in Division One; Medway Corinthians and Orpington Athletic were the only two clubs to field a first team in Division Two; Medway joined in 1959 and left in 1961, with Orpington joining in 1960 and remaining until the league folded. As a result of Division Two being largely reserve teams, there was no promotion or relegation between the two divisions.

In 1964 after only five seasons of existence, it merged with the London League to form the Greater London League. This later merged with the Metropolitan League to form the Metropolitan–London League, which in turn merged with the Spartan League and later the South Midlands League to form the modern Spartan South Midlands League.

== History ==
=== 1959–60 ===
Fourteen clubs joined the league for its first season:

- Seven from the defunct Kent League (Deal Town, Faversham Town, Chatham Town, Snowdown Colliery Welfare, Herne Bay, Sheppey United and Whitstable Town)
- Four from the London League (Cheshunt, Cray Wanderers, Eton Manor and Willesden)
- One from the Kent Amateur League (Crockenhill)
- One new club, Ford United (a merger of Briggs Motor Bodies and Ford Sports)
- Charlton Athletic 'A'

Pos	Team	Pld	W	D	L	GF	GA	GD	Pts	Notes
1	Ford United	26	15	7	4	65	32	+33	37	
2	Deal Town	26	14	7	5	68	35	+33	35	
3	Faversham Town	26	11	8	7	64	39	+25	30	
4	Chatham Town	26	12	6	8	48	40	+8	30	
5	Eton Manor	26	10	7	9	55	49	+6	27	
6	Crockenhill	26	9	9	8	47	55	−8	27	
7	Snowdown Colliery Welfare	26	8	10	8	47	47	0	26	
8	Willesden	26	11	2	13	53	50	+3	24	
9	Cray Wanderers	26	11	2	13	52	56	−4	24	
10	Cheshunt	26	10	4	12	47	68	−21	24	
11	Charlton Athletic 'A'	26	8	7	11	52	53	−1	23	
12	Herne Bay	26	8	7	11	51	61	−10	23	
13	Sheppey United	26	8	4	14	48	68	−20	20	
14	Whitstable Town	26	5	4	17	29	73	−44	14	Dropped into Kent Amateur League

Source: Sheppey United

=== 1960–61 ===
Ford United won the League Cup in the 1960–61 season.

Pos	Team	Pld	W	D	L	GF	GA	GD	Pts
1	Snowdown Colliery Welfare	24	18	2	4	81	40	+41	38
2	Ford United	24	14	3	7	68	39	+29	31
3	Cray Wanderers	24	14	3	7	79	52	+27	31
4	Herne Bay	24	11	9	4	50	40	+10	31
5	Sheppey United	24	9	6	9	62	60	+2	24
6	Cheshunt	24	10	3	11	44	53	−9	23
7	Crockenhill	24	9	4	11	55	61	−6	22
8	Chatham Town	24	10	2	12	37	50	−13	22
9	Eton Manor	24	9	3	12	43	53	−10	21
10	Deal Town	24	8	5	11	52	66	−14	21
11	Faversham Town	24	5	8	11	45	60	−15	18
12	Charlton Athletic 'A'	24	5	6	13	39	58	−19	16
13	Willesden	24	5	4	15	33	56	−23	14

Source: Sheppey United

=== 1961–62 ===
One new club, Beckenham Town from the London League, joined the league for the 1961–62 season.

Pos	Team	Pld	W	D	L	GF	GA	GD	Pts	Notes
1	Ford United	26	16	6	4	61	22	+39	38	
2	Snowdown Colliery Welfare	26	14	6	6	71	51	+20	34	
3	Cheshunt	26	13	6	7	67	49	+18	32	Joined Spartan League
4	Sheppey United	26	14	4	8	64	57	+7	32	
5	Deal Town	26	13	5	8	56	50	+6	31	
6	Herne Bay	26	14	2	10	53	55	−2	30	
7	Cray Wanderers	26	12	4	10	60	52	+8	28	
8	Willesden	26	10	4	12	60	61	−1	24	
9	Chatham Town	26	10	4	12	55	57	−2	24	
10	Charlton Athletic 'A'	26	11	0	15	65	58	+7	22	Left the league
11	Eton Manor	26	6	9	11	41	41	0	21	
12	Faversham Town	26	8	4	14	47	69	−22	20	
13	Beckenham Town	26	8	4	14	36	64	−28	20	
14	Crockenhill	26	3	2	21	48	98	−50	8	

Source: Sheppey United

=== 1962–63 ===
One new club, East Ham United from the London League, joined the league for the 1962–63 season.

Pos	Team	Pld	W	D	L	GF	GA	GD	Pts	Notes
1	Cray Wanderers	24	16	5	3	58	30	+28	37	
2	Chatham Town	24	16	3	5	69	24	+45	35	
3	Herne Bay	24	14	6	4	59	27	+32	34	
4	Ford United	24	16	2	6	54	29	+25	34	
5	Deal Town	24	11	5	8	47	41	+6	27	Promotion to Southern League Division One
6	Faversham Town	24	10	5	9	43	36	+7	25	
7	Eton Manor	24	10	4	10	46	35	+11	24	
8	Snowdown Colliery Welfare	24	9	6	9	38	34	+4	24	
9	Sheppey United	24	6	7	11	48	61	−13	19	
10	East Ham United	24	9	1	14	34	59	−25	19	
11	Willesden	24	6	4	14	33	50	−17	16	Joined Spartan League
12	Beckenham Town	24	4	2	18	29	76	−47	10	
13	Crockenhill	24	3	2	19	28	84	−56	8	

Source: Sheppey United

=== 1963–64 ===
Whistable Town rejoined the league for the 1963–64 season. At the end of the season most clubs joined the newly formed Greater London League.

Pos	Team	Pld	W	D	L	GF	GA	GD	Pts	Notes
1	Chatham Town	22	16	4	2	73	24	+49	36	Joined the Metropolitan League
2	Herne Bay	22	16	3	3	70	23	+47	35	Promotion to Athenian League Division Two
3	Cray Wanderers	22	15	5	2	76	27	+49	35	Placed in B Section of Greater London League
4	Sheppey United	22	12	4	6	64	49	+15	28	Placed in B Section of Greater London League
5	Ford United	22	12	2	8	55	38	+17	26	Placed in A Section of Greater London League
6	Snowdown Colliery Welfare	21	9	1	11	43	37	+6	19	Placed in B Section of Greater London League
7	Faversham Town	22	8	2	12	38	51	−13	18	Placed in B Section of Greater London League
8	Beckenham Town	21	5	4	12	36	69	−33	14	Placed in B Section of Greater London League
9	Eton Manor	22	6	2	14	25	62	−37	14	Placed in A Section of Greater London League
10	Crockenhill	22	6	1	15	39	65	−26	13	Placed in B Section of Greater London League
11	Whitstable Town	22	5	2	15	38	76	−38	12	Placed in B Section of Greater London League
12	East Ham United	22	5	2	15	36	72	−36	12	Placed in A Section of Greater London League

Source: Sheppey United
