= Mick Paye =

English footballer

Personal information
- Full name: Michael Charles Paye
- Date of birth: 30 July 1966 (age 60)
- Place of birth: Lambeth, England
- Position: Right-back

Senior career*
Years	Team	Apps	(Gls)
1983–1984	Charlton Athletic	2	(0)
- * Club domestic league appearances and goals

Michael Charles Paye (born 30 July 1966) is an English former professional footballer who played in the Football League as a defender. He is a Director of Cray Wanderers, having previously served as joint manager. He made nearly 200 appearances for Cray between 1987 and 1991.
