= Harry Seaden =

English footballer (born 2001)

Personal information
- Full name: Harry John Seaden
- Date of birth: 23 April 2001 (age 25)
- Place of birth: Southend-on-Sea, England
- Position: Goalkeeper

Team information
- Current team: Margate

Youth career
- Rayleigh Town
- 2014–2018: Southend United

Senior career*
Years	Team	Apps	(Gls)
2018–2022	Southend United	4	(0)
2017	→ Cambridge City (loan)	1	(0)
2018	→ Colchester United (loan)	0	(0)
2019	→ Great Wakering Rovers (loan)		
2019	→ Cambridge City (loan)	2	(0)
2019–2020	→ Dagenham & Redbridge (loan)	0	(0)
2022–2023	Billericay Town	42	(0)
2023–2024	Margate	40	(0)
2024	Hemel Hempstead Town	0	(0)
2024	Hornchurch	1	(0)
2024–2025	Concord Rangers	25	(0)
2025–2026	Cray Wanderers	39	(0)
2026–	Margate	0	(0)

International career
2016–2017	England U16	6	(0)
2017	England U17	3	(0)
- * Club domestic league appearances and goals as of 18:04, 14 August 2026 (UTC)

Harry John Seaden (born 23 April 2001) is an English professional footballer who plays as a goalkeeper for Isthmian League South East Division club Margate.

== Club career ==
=== Southend United ===
Seaden joined Southend United at the age of 13 from local youth club Rayleigh Town. In December 2017, Seaden made a single loan appearance for Cambridge City. During the 2017–18 season, Seaden was also loaned to rivals Colchester United, primarily featuring in the club's FA Youth Cup campaign. In 2019, following involvement with Southend's first team squad, Seaden joined Great Wakering Rovers on loan. During the 2019–20 season, Seaden was loaned to both Cambridge City and Dagenham & Redbridge, before making his Southend debut on 18 February 2020 in a 1–0 loss against Gillingham. On 11 February 2022, Seaden left Southend United when his contract was terminated by mutual consent.

=== Billericay Town ===
On 22 June 2022, following a trial at Derby County, Seaden signed for Isthmian League side Billericay Town.

=== Margate ===
In August 2023, Seaden joined fellow Isthmian League Premier Division side Margate.

=== Hornchurch ===
On 11 October 2024, Seaden joined Hornchurch.

=== Cray Wanderers ===
In June 2025, Seaden joined Isthmian League Premier Division side Cray Wanderers.

=== Return to Margate ===
On 5 August 2026, Seaden returned to Isthmian League South East Division club Margate.

== International career ==
Seaden has represented England at under-16 and under-17 level.

== Personal life ==
Seaden's father, John, made 18 Football League appearances for Southend in the 1980s.

== Career statistics ==
As of end of 2025–26 season

Appearances and goals by club, season and competition
Club	Season	League			FA Cup		League Cup		Other		Total	
Club	Season	Division	Apps	Goals	Apps	Goals	Apps	Goals	Apps	Goals	Apps	Goals
Southend United	League One	2018–19	0	0	0	0	0	0	0	0	0	0
Southend United	League One	2019–20	1	0	0	0	0	0	0	0	1	0
Southend United	League Two	2020–21	0	0	0	0	0	0	1 (Note: Appearance in EFL Trophy)	0	1	0
Southend United	Total		1	0	0	0	0	0	1	0	2	0
Cambridge City (loan)	SL East Division	2017–18	1	0	—		—		—		1	0
Cambridge City (loan)	IL North Division	2019–20	2	0	—		—		—		2	0
Cambridge City (loan)	Total		3	0	—		—		—		3	0
Dagenham & Redbridge (loan)	National League	2019–20	0	0	—		—		2 (Note: Appearances in FA Trophy)	0	2	0
Billericay Town	2022–23	Isthmian League Premier Division	42	0	4	0	—		5 (Note: Three appearances in FA Trophy, one appearance in Alan Turvey Trophy, one appearance in Essex Senior Cup)	0	51	0
Margate	2023–24	Isthmian League Premier Division	40	0	4	0	—		3 (Note: One appearance in Kent Senior Cup, one appearance in FA Trophy, one appearance in Alan Turvey Trophy)	0	47	0
Hemel Hempstead Town	2024–25	National League South	0	0	1	0	—		0	0	1	0
Hornchurch	2024–25	National League South	1	0	0	0	—		0	0	1	0
Concord Rangers	2024–25	Isthmian League North Division	25	0	0	0	—		0	0	25	0
Cray Wanderers	2025–26	Isthmian League Premier Division	39	0	2	0	—		0	0	41	0
Career total			112	0	11	0	0	0	11	0	134	0
