= Cray Wanderers F.C. =

Association football club in London, England

Cray Wanderers
- Full name: Cray Wanderers Football Club
- Nickname: The Wands
- Founded: 1860; 166 years ago traditionally
- Ground: Flamingo Park, Chislehurst
- Capacity: 2,500 (299 seated)
- Chairman: Gary Hillman
- Manager: Tim O'Shea
- League: Isthmian League Premier Division
- 2025–26: Isthmian League Premier Division, 7th of 22
- Website: www.cray-wanderers.com
| Home colours | Away colours |

Cray Wanderers Football Club is an English semi-professional football club based in Chislehurst, London. Based on later reports, the club has a claim to have been established some time in 1860 in the twin villages of St Mary Cray and St Paul's Cray, near Orpington. Such a date would make it one of the oldest football clubs in the world. Cray Wanderers play their home games at Flamingo Park.

Cray Wanderers were Kent League champions four times and have reached the first round proper of the FA Cup once in their history, having reached as far as the fourth qualifying round in three other seasons. The club currently play in the Isthmian League Premier Division.

== Badge ==
The badge of Cray Wanderers is based on the coat of arms of Orpington Urban District, before the 1965 Greater London expansion, in yellow and black with 'CRAY WANDERERS FC' and 'Founded 1860' encompassing the crest.

Today, the coat of arms of Orpington is no longer used, as it was replaced with the London Borough of Bromley coat of arms. Although Cray Wanderers still use the crest today, recently their badge was altered for a simplified design, which can be found on all digital platforms.

== History ==
The claimed origins of Cray Wanderers are linked to the construction of the London, Chatham and Dover Railway line during 1858 to 1860. During their leisure time, migrant workers kicked a ball around, and that is how the club originated in the St Mary Cray village; The industrial belt of the River Cray, especially the paper mills, provided much of the club's support up until the 1950s. The pitch at Star Lane is now a cemetery, and is located beneath the nine-arch railway viaduct that spans the Cray Valley. However, the first reference to a Cray Wanderers club is from the 1886–87 season, and even then the club was playing under rugby football rules. The club was playing under association rules from 1888–89, playing at the Recreation Ground.

Cray Wanderers were a strong force in senior county football at the turn of the century. After being Kent Junior Cup semi-finalists and finalists in 1890–91 and 1891–92, they entered the first ever FA Amateur Cup competition in 1893–94. They had a spell as a professional club between 1895 and 1907. They were a nursery club for Woolwich Arsenal during part of this period. They were one of the founder members of the Kent League in 1894–95, and they won the championship in 1901–02. Other honours included Southern Suburban League champions in 1898–99, West Kent League champions in 1903–04, and Kent Senior Cup runners-up in 1899–1900.

After World War I, Cray switched to the London League where they remained until 1934. In the 1930–31 season, they won the Kent Amateur Cup. Cray rejoined the Kent League in 1934–35, but their four-year stay came to grief when 1936 saw the loss of the Fordcroft ground in Cray Avenue, their home since 1898. Cray were forced to drop into a lower level of football, drifting from one temporary pitch to another while the club committee dwindled to a perilously small number. The team struggled in the South London Alliance and the Kent Amateur League.

In 1936, under Harry Taylor's guidance, the Orpington & District Amateur Boxing Club organised various tournaments to raise funds for Cray Wanderers Football Club, ensuring its survival during the challenging times.

1951-52 heralded a new era, and an upturn in the club's fortunes, when local businessman Mick Slater took over at the helm. The club was elected to the London League and regained its senior status. Cray moved to a new ground at Grassmeade in 1955. Their stay there was a very successful period in the club's history. Drawing extra support from the commuter town of Orpington, they played in the London League and then the Aetolian League. They were three times crowned champions, won the League Cup twice, and also won the Kent Amateur Cup three times.

Cray switched to the semi-professional Metropolitan League for five seasons commencing in 1966–67. In 1971–72, the Met London League was created by a merger of the Metropolitan League and the Greater London League.

Cray moved to Oxford Road in 1973–74. Johnny Biddle and Jimmy Wakeling proved to be successful managers. In 1974/75 Cray won the Met London League and League Cup, scoring 170 goals in all matches that season. In 1976–77 and 1977–78, Cray won the London Spartan League championship.

Cray decided to return to the Kent League in 1978–79. Success came quickly because Cray won the championship in 1980/81, having been runners-up the year before. Their powerful new team under manager Harry Richardson reached the FA Vase quarter-final and 5th round in those two seasons. After that, the 1980s decade brought only one more piece of silverware, the Kent League Cup in 1983–84. After finishing Kent League runners up in 1990/91, Cray had a lean period during most of the 1990s, with the exception of 1992–93 when they won the Kent Senior Trophy.

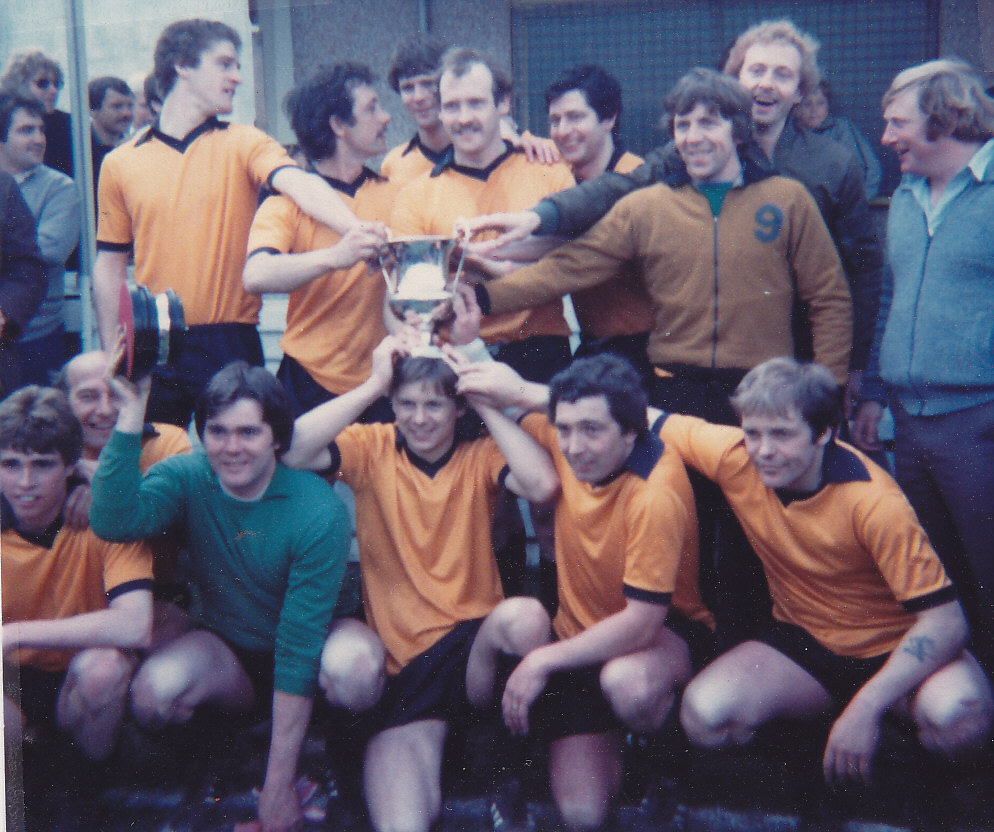
Kent League champions in 1981.

A new club chairman Gary Hillman arrived in 1994/95 and Ian Jenkins, a Cray player since 1993, was appointed manager in 1999. By now, Cray were tenants of Bromley F.C. As champions of the Kent League in 2002–03 and 2003–04, also reaching the FA Vase quarter-final, they achieved promotion into the Isthmian League Division One.

In the 2007–08 season Cray reached the play-off final after finishing 3rd in the table, but lost to Tooting & Mitcham United 1–0 at Imperial Fields. They also reached the Kent Senior Cup final, played at Hayes Lane on 26 July, where they lost to Ebbsfleet United 4–0. Cray again reached the play-off final the following year, in which they defeated Metropolitan Police 1–0 and were promoted to the Isthmian League Premier Division.

Cray Wanderers celebrated their 150th anniversary during the summer of 2010, including friendlies against the other two oldest clubs in the world, Sheffield and Hallam, in a three-team tournament.

Ian Jenkins, who had managed the club for 14 years, left in September 2013. Keith Bird and Mike Paye, managers of Bromley's reserve team, were appointed as manager and assistant manager respectively. The team was relegated into the Isthmian League Division One North at the end of April 2014. Gary Abbott and Mike Paye became joint managers of the team at the start of October 2014. On 5 January 2015 the club appointed Tommy Warrilow as the new manager. Warrilow masterminded a dramatic "Great Escape" from a second successive relegation as the team won their last ten games of the season.

Former player Tony Russell took over for the 2015–16 season, guiding the team to fourth place in Division One North. Cray therefore qualified for the promotion play-offs but lost to Harlow Town. Two years later, they reached the play-offs again, this time after finishing 3rd in Division One South, but lost 5–2 to Walton Casuals. On 13 April 2019, Cray secured their return to the Premier Division with a 3–1 win over Ashford United to win the inaugural Division One South-East title. The following season, Cray were challenging for a second successive promotion when the season was abandoned due to the COVID-19 pandemic.

Neil Smith was appointed as manager towards the end of the 2021–22 season and the following year led Cray to the highest league finish in their history (5th). The Wands lost on penalties to Hornchurch in the play-off semi-final.

In October 2026, Cray Wanderers qualified for the first round proper of the FA Cup for the first time in their history after defeating Bedford Town 4-3 on penalties after extra time in a fourth qualifying round replay.

=== League history ===
Information taken from club stats book.

| Season | League contested | Played | Won | Drawn | Lost | For | Against | Points | Final league position |
|---|---|---|---|---|---|---|---|---|---|
| 2025–26 | Isthmian League Premier Division | 42 | 17 | 16 | 9 | 79 | 71 | 67 | 7th of 22 |
| 2024–25 | Isthmian League Premier Division | 42 | 18 | 7 | 17 | 58 | 52 | 61 | 10th of 22 |
| 2023–24 | Isthmian League Premier Division | 42 | 13 | 11 | 18 | 54 | 66 | 50 | 17th of 22 |
| 2022–23 | Isthmian League Premier Division | 42 | 20 | 14 | 8 | 78 | 48 | 74 | 5th of 22 |
| 2021–22 | Isthmian League Premier Division | 42 | 10 | 9 | 23 | 64 | 85 | 36 | 19th of 22 |
| 2020–21 | Isthmian League Premier Division | 7 | 5 | 0 | 2 | 21 | 10 | 15 | Season curtailed |
| 2019–20 | Isthmian League Premier Division | 33 | 18 | 10 | 5 | 63 | 45 | 64 | 2nd of 22 Season abandoned |
| 2018–19 | Isthmian League South East Division | 36 | 25 | 7 | 4 | 79 | 35 | 82 | 1st of 19 Promoted |
| 2017–18 | Isthmian League Division One South | 46 | 25 | 14 | 7 | 112 | 46 | 89 | 3rd of 24 |
| 2016–17 | Isthmian League Division One South | 46 | 19 | 11 | 16 | 88 | 86 | 68 | 11th of 24 |
| 2015–16 | Isthmian League Division One North | 46 | 27 | 9 | 10 | 98 | 52 | 90 | 4th of 24 |
| 2014–15 | Isthmian League Division One North | 46 | 14 | 10 | 22 | 77 | 86 | 52 | 16th of 24 |
| 2013–14 | Isthmian League Premier Division | 46 | 7 | 5 | 34 | 40 | 137 | 26 | 24th of 24 Relegated |
| 2012–13 | Isthmian League Premier Division | 42 | 10 | 13 | 19 | 60 | 85 | 43 | 17th of 22 |
| 2011–12 | Isthmian League Premier Division | 42 | 20 | 8 | 14 | 74 | 55 | 68 | 9th of 22 |
| 2010–11 | Isthmian League Premier Division | 42 | 20 | 9 | 13 | 72 | 46 | 69 | 9th of 22 |
| 2009–10 | Isthmian League Premier Division | 42 | 14 | 9 | 19 | 54 | 70 | 51 | 15th of 22 |
| 2008–09 | Isthmian League Division One South | 42 | 24 | 7 | 11 | 87 | 54 | 79 | 2nd of 22 Promoted |
| 2007–08 | Isthmian League Division One South | 42 | 25 | 11 | 6 | 87 | 42 | 86 | 3rd of 22 |
| 2006–07 | Isthmian League Division One South | 42 | 14 | 12 | 16 | 67 | 69 | 54 | 12th of 22 |
| 2005–06 | Isthmian League Division One | 44 | 20 | 8 | 16 | 80 | 74 | 68 | 11th of 23 |
| 2004–05 | Isthmian League Division One | 42 | 19 | 16 | 7 | 95 | 54 | 73 | 6th of 22 |
| 2003–04 | Kent League | 32 | 22 | 4 | 6 | 88 | 35 | 70 | 1st of 17 Promoted |
| 2002–03 | Kent League | 29 | 19 | 5 | 5 | 68 | 23 | 62 | 1st of 16 |
| 2001–02 | Kent League | 30 | 15 | 6 | 9 | 56 | 44 | 51 | 5th of 16 |
| 2000–01 | Kent League | 32 | 10 | 5 | 17 | 39 | 46 | 35 | 12th of 17 |
| 1999–00 | Kent League | 34 | 10 | 3 | 21 | 42 | 80 | 33 | 13th of 18 |
| 1998–99 | Kent League | 36 | 8 | 9 | 19 | 53 | 66 | 35 | 14th of 19 |
| 1997–98 | Kent League | 42 | 20 | 11 | 11 | 70 | 50 | 71 | 6th of 22 |
| 1996–97 | Kent League | 40 | 11 | 6 | 23 | 43 | 66 | 39 | 18th of 21 |
| 1995–96 | Kent League | 38 | 16 | 5 | 17 | 70 | 70 | 50 | 12th of 20 |
| 1994–95 | Kent League | 40 | 6 | 14 | 20 | 45 | 76 | 32 | 19th of 21 |
| 1993–94 | Kent League | 40 | 11 | 9 | 20 | 37 | 65 | 42 | 17th of 21 |
| 1992–93 | Kent League | 40 | 10 | 8 | 22 | 64 | 79 | 38 | 17th of 21 |
| 1991–92 | Kent League | 40 | 8 | 7 | 25 | 38 | 84 | 31 | 18th of 21 |
| 1990–91 | Kent League | 40 | 27 | 11 | 2 | 91 | 33 | 92 | 2nd of 21 |
| 1989–90 | Kent League | 38 | 7 | 11 | 20 | 48 | 74 | 32 | 18th of 20 |
| 1988–89 | Kent League | 38 | 19 | 7 | 12 | 67 | 53 | 64 | 7th of 20 |
| 1987–88 | Kent League | 36 | 16 | 7 | 13 | 72 | 51 | 55 | 7th of 19 |
| 1986–87 | Kent League | 34 | 12 | 8 | 14 | 56 | 48 | 44 | 10th of 18 |
| 1985–86 | Kent League | 34 | 9 | 12 | 13 | 34 | 51 | 39 | 14th of 18 |
| 1984–85 | Kent League | 32 | 17 | 2 | 13 | 59 | 51 | 53 | 5th of 17 |
| 1983–84 | Kent League | 30 | 14 | 7 | 9 | 66 | 40 | 49 | 4th of 16 |
| 1982–83 | Kent League | 32 | 12 | 10 | 10 | 65 | 53 | 34 | 8th of 17 |
| 1981–82 | Kent League | 30 | 13 | 6 | 11 | 51 | 40 | 32 | 8th of 16 |
| 1980–81 | Kent League | 32 | 24 | 5 | 3 | 92 | 27 | 53 | 1st of 17 |
| 1979–80 | Kent League | 32 | 20 | 9 | 3 | 80 | 25 | 49 | 2nd of 17 |
| 1978–79 | Kent League | 34 | 9 | 9 | 16 | 50 | 65 | 27 | 14th of 18 |
| 1977-78 | London Spartan League Premier Division (renamed from Division One) | 30 | 21 | 5 | 4 | 74 | 30 | 47 | 1st of 16 |
| 1976-77 | London Spartan League Division One | 30 | 23 | 3 | 4 | 66 | 21 | 49 | 1st of 16 |
| 1975-76 | London Spartan League Division One | 30 | 11 | 9 | 10 | 55 | 55 | 31 | 6th of 16 |
| 1974-75 | Metropolitan-London League | 38 | 32 | 4 | 2 | 128 | 36 | 68 | 1st of 20 |
| 1973-74 | Metropolitan-London League Division One | 26 | 14 | 5 | 7 | 62 | 42 | 33 | 4th of 14 |
| 1972-73 | Metropolitan-London League Division One | 26 | 16 | 2 | 8 | 46 | 28 | 34 | 4th of 14 |
| 1971-72 | Metropolitan-London League Division One | 26 | 15 | 1 | 10 | 59 | 38 | 31 | 4th of 14 |
| 1970–71 | Metropolitan League | 22 | 12 | 3 | 7 | 45 | 36 | 27 | 4th of 12 |
| 1969–70 | Metropolitan League | 28 | 8 | 5 | 15 | 34 | 52 | 21 | 13th of 15 |
| 1968–69 | Metropolitan League | 30 | 11 | 5 | 14 | 49 | 49 | 27 | 12th of 16 |
| 1967–68 | Metropolitan League | 26 | 12 | 8 | 6 | 50 | 35 | 32 | 4th of 14 |
| 1966–67 | Metropolitan League | 32 | 14 | 6 | 12 | 60 | 75 | 34 | 9th of 17 |
| 1965–66 | Greater London League Premier Division | 26 | 19 | 4 | 3 | 57 | 30 | 42 | 1st of 14 |
| 1964–65 | Greater London League Senior Division B | 22 | 16 | 3 | 3 | 66 | 25 | 35 | 2nd of 12 |
| 1963-64 | Aetolian League | 22 | 15 | 5 | 2 | 76 | 27 | 35 | 3rd of 12 |
| 1962-63 | Aetolian League | 24 | 16 | 5 | 3 | 58 | 30 | 37 | 1st of 13 |
| 1961-62 | Aetolian League | 26 | 12 | 4 | 10 | 60 | 52 | 28 | 7th of 14 |
| 1960-61 | Aetolian League | 24 | 14 | 3 | 7 | 79 | 52 | 31 | 3rd of 13 |
| 1959-60 | Aetolian League | 26 | 11 | 2 | 13 | 52 | 56 | 24 | 9th of 14 |
| 1958-59 | London League | 28 | 15 | 4 | 9 | 79 | 51 | 34 | 3rd of 15 |
| 1957-58 | London League | 30 | 23 | 5 | 2 | 102 | 35 | 51 | 1st of 16 |
| 1956-57 | London League | 28 | 23 | 2 | 3 | 118 | 54 | 48 | 1st of 15 |
| 1955-56 | London League Premier Division | 24 | 14 | 4 | 6 | 50 | 37 | 32 | 3rd of 13 |
| 1954-55 | London League Premier Division | 22 | 16 | 3 | 3 | 53 | 29 | 35 | 2nd of 12 |
| 1953-54 | London League Premier Division | 26 | 15 | 6 | 5 | 66 | 46 | 36 | 2nd of 14 |
| 1952-53 | London League Premier Division | 30 | 9 | 6 | 15 | 56 | 60 | 24 | 12th of 16 |
| 1951-52 | London League Premier Division | 28 | 10 | 4 | 14 | 52 | 72 | 24 | 10th of 15 |
| 1950-51 | Kent Amateur League (West) Premier Division | 27 | 18 | 1 | 8 | 75 | 47 | 39 | 2nd of 15 |
| 1949-50 | Kent Amateur League (West) Premier Division | 26 | 2 | 4 | 20 | 24 | 88 | 8 | 14th of 14 |
| 1948-49 | Kent Amateur League (West) Premier Division | 25 | 1 | 5 | 19 | 27 | 103 | 7 | 14th of 14 |
| 1947-48 | Kent Amateur League (West) Premier Division | 26 | 3 | 4 | 19 | 53 | 107 | 10 | 13th of 14 |
| 1946-47 | Kent Amateur League (West) Premier Division | 22 | 5 | 2 | 15 | 55 | 81 | 12 | 11th of 12 |
| 1945-46 | South London Alliance (South) | 25 | 15 | 4 | 6 | 91 | 58 | 34 | 2nd of 14 |
| 1944-45 | South London Alliance (South) | 22 | 13 | 1 | 8 | 79 | 50 | 27 | 5th of 13 |
| 1943-44 | South London Alliance (South) | 23 | 10 | 7 | 6 | 56 | 46 | 27 | 5th of 13 |
| 1938-39 | Kent Amateur League (West) Premier Division | 24 | 13 | 2 | 9 | 61 | 56 | 26 | 6th of 13 |
| 1937-38 | Kent League | 32 | 5 | 1 | 26 | 39 | 130 | 11 | 17th of 17 |
| 1936-37 | Kent League | 32 | 3 | 4 | 25 | 55 | 164 | 10 | 17th of 17 |
| 1935-36 | Kent League | 36 | 16 | 7 | 13 | 62 | 83 | 39 | 7th of 19 |
| 1934-35 | Kent League | 36 | 13 | 1 | 22 | 63 | 106 | 27 | 17th of 19 |
| 1933-34 | London League Premier Division | 26 | 4 | 4 | 18 | 41 | 97 | 12 | 14th of 14 |
| 1932-33 | London League Premier Division | 26 | 9 | 5 | 12 | 54 | 58 | 23 | 9th of 14 |
| 1931-32 | London League Premier Division | 26 | 6 | 4 | 16 | 56 | 104 | 16 | 13th of 14 |
| 1930-31 | London League Premier Division | 26 | 9 | 4 | 13 | 45 | 55 | 22 | 9th of 14 |
| 1929-30 | London League Premier Division | 26 | 8 | 3 | 15 | 55 | 68 | 19 | 12th of 14 |
| 1928-29 | London League Premier Division | 24 | 13 | 4 | 7 | 84 | 56 | 30 | 4th of 13 |
| 1927-28 | London League Premier Division | 24 | 12 | 6 | 6 | 55 | 78 | 60 | 3rd of 13 |
| 1926-27 | London League Premier Division | 26 | 12 | 2 | 12 | 80 | 76 | 26 | 9th of 14 |
| 1925-26 | London League Premier Division | 26 | 13 | 4 | 9 | 54 | 50 | 30 | 5th of 14 |
| 1924-25 | London League Premier Division | 26 | 8 | 4 | 14 | 46 | 60 | 20 | 5th of 14 |
| 1923-24 | London League Premier Division | 30 | 8 | 6 | 16 | 36 | 54 | 22 | 12th of 16 |
| 1922-23 | London League Premier Division | 30 | 10 | 1 | 19 | 58 | 87 | 21 | 13th of 16 |
| 1921-22 | London League Division One | 30 | 21 | 3 | 6 | 87 | 40 | 45 | 3rd of 16 Promoted |
| 1920-21 | London League Division One | 30 | 14 | 9 | 7 | 88 | 54 | 37 | 4th of 16 |
| 1913-14 | Kent League Division Two West South Suburban League Senior Division East | 18 20 | 9 13 | 1 0 | 8 7 | 42 56 | 48 43 | 19 26 | 6th of 10 4th of 11 |
| 1912-13 | Kent League Division One | 28 | 6 | 5 | 17 | 41 | 74 | 17 | 15th of 15 Relegated |
| 1911-12 | Kent League Division One | 28 | 8 | 4 | 16 | 44 | 69 | 20 | 14th of 15 |
| 1910-11 | Kent League Division Two West West Kent League Division One Blackheath League Premier Division | 10 8 8 | 7 5 5 | 0 1 1 | 3 2 2 | 29 10 26 | 19 6 20 | 14 11 11 | 2nd of 6 Promoted 2nd of 5 1st of 5 |
| 1909-10 | Kent League Division Two West Blackheath League Premier Division | 16 12 | 9 7 | 2 1 | 5 4 | 36 47 | 20 29 | 20 15 | 2nd of 9 3rd of 7 |
| 1908-09 | West Kent League Division One South Suburban League Senior Division | 20 10 | 6 6 | 5 2 | 9 2 | 40 23 | 53 16 | 17 14 | 5th of 11 2nd of 6 |
| 1907-08 | West Kent League Division One Dartford League Premier Division | 20 6 | 3 2 | 5 0 | 12 4 | 21 7 | 62 12 | 11 4 | 10th of 11 4th of 4 |
| 1906-07 | Kent League West Kent League Division One | 14 20 | 4 5 | 1 6 | 9 9 | 20 24 | 51 38 | 9 16 | 7th of 8 7th of 11 |
| 1905-06 | West Kent League Division One | 14 | 8 | 2 | 4 | 40 | 17 | 18 | 3rd of 8 |
| 1904-05 | West Kent League Division One | 20 | 12 | 2 | 6 | 50 | 26 | 26 | 3rd of 11 |
| 1903-04 | West Kent League Division One | 14 | 12 | 2 | 0 | 47 | 13 | 26 | 1st of 8 |
| 1902-03 | Kent League West Kent League | 16 14 | 5 11 | 1 0 | 10 3 | 24 33 | 43 11 | 11 2 | 6th of 9 2nd of 8 |
| 1901-02 | Kent League West Kent League | 20 12 | 15 9 | 2 2 | 3 1 | 69 36 | 21 16 | 32 20 | 1st of 11 2nd of 7 |
| 1900-01 | Kent League West Kent League | 16 10 | 7 3 | 0 2 | 9 5 | 27 16 | 33 19 | 14 8 | 6th of 9 4th of 6 |
| 1899-1900 | Kent League | 19 | 5 | 2 | 12 | 24 | 49 | 12 | 10th of 11 |
| 1898-99 | Kent League South Suburban League Division One | 24 13 | 8 12 | 8 0 | 8 1 | 47 51 | 58 17 | 24 24 | 9th of 13 1st of 8 |
| 1897-98 | Kent League Division One South Suburban League Division One | 14 10 | 3 5 | 3 2 | 8 3 | 26 22 | 36 14 | 9 12 | 7th of 8 2nd of 6 |
| 1896-97 | Kent League Division One South London League Division One | 16 16 | 6 9 | 1 3 | 9 4 | 44 42 | 37 18 | 13 21 | 7th of 9 3rd of 9 |
| 1895-96 | Kent League Division Two | 16 | 12 | 0 | 4 | 56 | 21 | 24 | 3rd of 9 Promoted |
| 1894–95 | Kent League Division Two | 16 | 10 | 2 | 4 | 48 | 25 | 22 | 3rd of 9 |

== Grounds ==
Cray Wanderers have played their home games at Flamingo Park, Chislehurst since 2024. This is the first ground the club have owned outright following an itinerant history.

Cray started playing football at Star Lane, St Mary Cray, now a cemetery. After playing at numerous other grounds in St Mary Cray and Foots Cray, Cray played at Grassmeade from 1954 to 1973, after which they moved to Oxford Road, Sidcup. Unfortunately for the club, in 1998 the Kent League ruled that clubs must have floodlighting. As Cray were unable to have lights installed, they were forced to move out and share the Hayes Lane ground of Bromley, although their reserve and youth teams continued to play at the former ground until 2011, when it was taken over by Seven Acre Sports & Sidcup.

Cray Wanderers at Oxford Road in 1997.

In the summer of 2008, Cray announced plans to move to a new stadium near Orpington by 2014. Official plans published on the club's official website on 18 February 2009 confirmed that the new ground at Sandy Lane would be open by 2014, for the 2014–15 season, subject to planning consent. The stadium, which was proposed to be part of a new "Sports Village-like complex" was designed to be eco-friendly and to be built to an initial Conference standard.

The bid was rejected unanimously, by all councillors on Bromley Council's Development Control Committee on Thursday 20 September 2012. This was for a number of reasons, but mainly because the club was hoping to build a Football League sized stadium, using the profits from building nearly 200 houses and a large hotel on Green Belt land.

In the debate on the application, which was opposed by the Police and the GLA as well as other bodies, it was clear that Councillors were supportive of a proposal to relocate Cray Wanderers to a new home in St Paul's Cray, but not to the building of houses, a hotel and another swimming pool, given that LA Leisure already have a swimming pool opposite the site, in order to fund it.

On 3 October 2014, Cray Wanderers signed a conditional contract to purchase Flamingo Park Sports Centre, historically in Foots Cray parish on the A20 Sidcup bypass. The club had an 18-month period to obtain planning consent from Bromley Council for a new sporting community hub, featuring a new multi-sport stadium with a spectator capacity of 1,300. This was achieved in April 2016, when the council approved the proposal. There was disappointment when the application was later refused by the Mayor of London and a revised set of plans was being prepared in 2017. These were finally approved in November 2018. Building work on the new stadium began in August 2023.

On 9 February 2024, the club announced that the 2023–24 season would be their final one groundsharing with Bromley and that they would move into their new stadium for the beginning of the 2024–25 season. Cray Wanderers began playing competitive games at the ground in August 2024.

== Academy ==
The Cray Wanderers Academy was established in January 2009. Initially based at Coopers School, Chislehurst, the academy competed in the Isthmian Youth League from the 2009–10 season, finishing second. In its first season it already showed signs of success, with youngster George Porter breaking into the senior first team in the academy's first season, impressing to the extent that he was signed by professional club Leyton Orient at the end of the season. Several other players have made first team appearances during the first season.

It was decided at the beginning of 2016 that this arrangement with Coopers School would come to an end. The academy is currently run out of the club's ground at Flamingo Park.

Marc Guehi the England international played for Cray Wanderer's youth teams aged 6.

== Women's team ==
In 2023 Cray Wanderers established a women's team for the first time, entering the South East Counties Women's League Kent Division 1 West. They were crowned league champions after a 6–0 victory in their final game of the season.

== Honours ==
- Isthmian League Division One
  - Winners (South East): 2018–19
  - Runners-up (South): 2008–09
  - Play-off Winners (South): 2008–09
- Kent League: 1901–02, 1980–81, 2002–03, 2003–04
  - Runners Up: 1979–80, 1990–91
- London League: 1956–57, 1957–58
  - Runners Up: 1953–54, 1954–55
- Aetolian League: 1962–63
- Greater London League: 1965–66
- Metropolitan-London League: 1974–75
- London Spartan League: 1976–77, 1977–78
- Kent Senior Trophy: 1992–92, 2003–04
- Kent Amateur Cup: 1930–31, 1962–63, 1963–64, 1964–65

== Best performances ==
- Best league performance: 5th in Isthmian League Premier Division, 2022-23 (NB Cray were 2nd in the Isthmian League Premier Division when the 2019–20 season was abandoned in March 2020)
- Best FA Cup performance: 1st round proper, 2026–27
- Best FA Amateur Cup performance: 3rd round (last 16), 1967–68
- Best FA Trophy performance: Third round, 2021–22, 2026–27
- Best FA Vase performance: Quarter-finals, 1979–80, 2003–04
- Best Kent Senior Cup performance: Final, 1900–01, 2007–08

== Current squad ==
As of 26 April 2026

Note: Flags indicate national team as defined under FIFA eligibility rules; some limited exceptions apply. Players may hold more than one non-FIFA nationality.

| No. | Pos. | Nation | Player |
|---|---|---|---|
| — | GK | ENG | Kevin Kardel |
| — | GK | ENG | Harry Seaden |
| — | DF | ENG | Frankie Morgan |
| — | DF | ENG | Remi Sutton |
| — | DF | ENG | Crossley Lema |
| — | DF | ENG | Quade Taylor |
| — | MF | ENG | Frankie Raymond (captain) |

| No. | Pos. | Nation | Player |
|---|---|---|---|
| — | MF | ENG | Ralf Hand |
| — | MF | ENG | Lateef Adaja |
| — | MF | ENG | Ola Ogunwamide |
| — | FW | ENG | Jordy Mongoy |
| — | FW | ENG | Alex Hernandez |
| — | FW | ENG | Dan Ajakaiye |
| — | FW | ENG | Shae Hutchinson |

== Club staff ==
| Position | Name |
|---|---|
Club Management
| Manager | (Republic of Ireland) Tim O'Shea |
| Assistant Manager | (England) Mark Stimson |
| Goalkeeper Coach | (England) Alfie George |
| Physio | (England) Ally Maloney |
| Kit Person | (England) Michelle Everitt |
Board
| Chairman | (England) Gary Hillman |
| Vice-chairman | (England) David Francis |
| President | (England) Keith Reeve |
| Life President | (England) Kerry Phillips |
| Directors | (England) Mick Paye |
| Directors | (England) Jason Miller |
| Club Secretary; Match Secretary | (England) Martin Hodson |

== Records ==
- Record attendance: 2,372 v Stockport County (FA Cup first round), 8 November 2026.
- Biggest Win: 15–0 vs Sevenoaks, 1894–95
- Biggest Defeat: 1–11 vs Bromley, 1920–21
- Biggest Isthmian League Win: 9–1 vs, Ashford United 2017–18
- Biggest Isthmian League Defeat: 3–9 vs Kingstonian, 2012–13

=== Player records ===
- Most appearances: John Dorey, 454 (1961–72)
- Most goals: Ken Collishaw, 274 (1954–65)

== Managerial history ==
Information from new club history published in 2024.

| Dates | Name | P | W | D | L | Win % |
|---|---|---|---|---|---|---|
| 1958–1960 | Peter Long | 54 | 26 | 6 | 22 | 48.15 |
| 1960–1961 | Charlie Prior | 24 | 14 | 3 | 7 | 58.33 |
| 1961–1966 | Arthur Baron | 131 | 81 | 23 | 27 | 61.83 |
| 1967–1969 | Norman Golding | 77 | 34 | 17 | 26 | 44.16 |
| 1969–1971 | Jack Payne | 68 | 34 | 9 | 25 | 50.00 |
| 1972 | Jim Paris (caretaker) | 8 | 1 | 0 | 7 | 12.50 |
| 1972–1975 | Johnny Biddle | 90 | 62 | 11 | 17 | 68.89 |
| 1975–1978 | Jimmy Wakeling | 90 | 55 | 17 | 18 | 61.11 |
| 1978 | Bobby Sustins | 8 | 1 | 1 | 6 | 12.50 |
| 1978–1979 | Albert Dorey | 18 | 5 | 6 | 7 | 27.78 |
| 1979 | Alan Williams (caretaker) | 8 | 3 | 2 | 3 | 50.00 |
| 1979–1981 | Harry Richardson | 64 | 44 | 14 | 6 | 68.75 |
| 1981–1986 | Alan Payne | 150 | 61 | 34 | 55 | 40.67 |
| 1986 | Trevor Willis (caretaker) | 8 | 4 | 3 | 1 | 50.00 |
| 1986–1991 | Peter Gaydon | 186 | 81 | 44 | 61 | 43.55 |
| 1991–1994 | Eddie Davies | 132 | 30 | 26 | 76 | 22.73 |
| 1994–1996 | Alan Whitehead | 66 | 21 | 17 | 28 | 31.82 |
| 1996–1997 | Glen Cooper | 40 | 11 | 6 | 23 | 27.50 |
| 1997–1998 | John Roseman | 42 | 20 | 11 | 11 | 47.62 |
| 1998–1999 | Ian Jenkins | 36 | 8 | 9 | 19 | 22.22 |
| 1999 | Fabio Rossi | 7 | 1 | 0 | 6 | 14.29 |
| 1999–2013 | Ian Jenkins | 546 | 245 | 117 | 184 | 44.87 |
| 2013–2014 | Keith Bird | 45 | 8 | 5 | 32 | 17.78 |
| 2014 | Michael Paye and Gary Abbott | 15 | 1 | 7 | 7 | 6.67 |
| 2015 | Tommy Warrilow | 21 | 11 | 2 | 8 | 52.38 |
| 2015–2021 | Tony Russell | 214 | 119 | 51 | 44 | 55.61 |
| 2021 | Danny Kedwell | 19 | 4 | 3 | 12 | 21.05 |
| 2021–2022 | Grant Basey (Interim) | 17 | 5 | 5 | 7 | 29.41 |
| 2022–2025 | Neil Smith | 125 | 49 | 32 | 44 | 39.20 |
| 2025- | Tim O'Shea | 49 | 20 | 17 | 12 | 40.81 |

(includes league games only)
