= 1964–65 Athenian League =

Athenian League
- Season: 1964–65

The 1964–65 Athenian League season was the 42nd in the history of Athenian League. The league consisted of 48 teams.

== Premier Division ==
Athenian League Premier Division
- Season: 1964–65
- Champions: Barnet
- Promoted: Barnet
- Relegated: Redhill

The division featured 3 new teams, all promoted from last season's Division One:

- Leatherhead (1st)
- Worthing (2nd)
- Edgware Town (3rd)

=== League table ===
| Pos | Team | Pld | W | D | L | GF | GA | GR | Pts | Promotion or relegation |
|---|---|---|---|---|---|---|---|---|---|---|
| 1 | Barnet (C, P) | 30 | 23 | 4 | 3 | 107 | 29 | 3.690 | 50 | Promotion to Southern League Division One |
| 2 | Leyton | 30 | 19 | 3 | 8 | 67 | 41 | 1.634 | 41 | |
| 3 | Finchley | 30 | 19 | 1 | 10 | 67 | 45 | 1.489 | 39 | |
| 4 | Worthing | 30 | 15 | 8 | 7 | 70 | 65 | 1.077 | 38 | |
| 5 | Walton & Hersham | 30 | 16 | 3 | 11 | 69 | 55 | 1.255 | 35 | |
| 6 | Hayes | 30 | 14 | 5 | 11 | 71 | 56 | 1.268 | 33 | |
| 7 | Hounslow Town | 30 | 14 | 5 | 11 | 69 | 61 | 1.131 | 33 | |
| 8 | Carshalton Athletic | 30 | 13 | 4 | 13 | 62 | 54 | 1.148 | 30 | |
| 9 | Maidenhead United | 30 | 12 | 6 | 12 | 60 | 53 | 1.132 | 30 | |
| 10 | Leatherhead | 30 | 13 | 3 | 14 | 51 | 54 | 0.944 | 29 | |
| 11 | Hornchurch | 30 | 11 | 6 | 13 | 61 | 67 | 0.910 | 28 | |
| 12 | Dagenham | 30 | 8 | 8 | 14 | 40 | 57 | 0.702 | 24 | |
| 13 | Edgware Town | 30 | 8 | 5 | 17 | 33 | 78 | 0.423 | 21 | |
| 14 | Grays Athletic | 30 | 8 | 4 | 18 | 48 | 75 | 0.640 | 20 | |
| 15 | Southall | 30 | 7 | 5 | 18 | 37 | 67 | 0.552 | 19 | |
| 16 | Redhill (R) | 30 | 4 | 2 | 24 | 32 | 87 | 0.368 | 10 | Relegation to Division One |

Source: rsssf.com
Rules for classification: 1) points; 2) goal ratio.
(C) Champions; (P) Promoted; (R) Relegated

=== Stadia and locations ===
Locations of the Athenian League Premier Division clubs
Greater London Athenian League Premier Division football clubs

| Club | Stadium |
|---|---|
| Barnet | Underhill Stadium |
| Carshalton Athletic | War Memorial Sports Ground |
| Dagenham | Victoria Road |
| Edgware Town | White Lion |
| Finchley | Summers Lane |
| Grays Athletic | New Recreation Ground |
| Hayes | Church Road |
| Hornchurch | Hornchurch Stadium |
| Hounslow | Denbigh Road |
| Leatherhead | Fetcham Grove |
| Leyton | Leyton Stadium |
| Maidenhead United | York Road |
| Redhill | Kiln Brow |
| Southall | Robert Parker Stadium |
| Walton & Hersham | The Sports Ground |
| Worthing | Woodside Road |

== Division One ==
Athenian League Division One
- Season: 1964–65
- Champions: Slough Town
- Promoted: Slough Town; Hemel Hempstead Town
- Relegated: Epsom & Ewell

The division featured 5 new teams, all promoted from last season's Division Two:

- Tilbury (1st)
- Harrow Town (2nd)
- Harlow Town (3rd)
- Hertford Town (4th)
- Hemel Hempstead Town (5th)

=== League table ===
| Pos | Team | Pld | W | D | L | GF | GA | GR | Pts | Promotion or relegation |
|---|---|---|---|---|---|---|---|---|---|---|
| 1 | Slough Town (C, P) | 30 | 21 | 6 | 3 | 81 | 23 | 3.522 | 48 | Promotion to Premier Division |
| 2 | Hemel Hempstead Town (P) | 30 | 21 | 4 | 5 | 77 | 32 | 2.406 | 46 | Promotion to Premier Division |
| 3 | Chesham United | 30 | 21 | 3 | 6 | 64 | 38 | 1.684 | 45 | |
| 4 | Horsham | 30 | 17 | 3 | 10 | 74 | 47 | 1.574 | 37 | |
| 5 | Harrow Town | 30 | 16 | 5 | 9 | 79 | 56 | 1.411 | 37 | |
| 6 | Hertford Town | 30 | 16 | 3 | 11 | 51 | 41 | 1.244 | 35 | |
| 7 | Letchworth Town | 30 | 16 | 3 | 11 | 68 | 60 | 1.133 | 35 | |
| 8 | Erith & Belvedere | 30 | 14 | 5 | 11 | 48 | 49 | 0.980 | 33 | |
| 9 | Tilbury | 30 | 13 | 4 | 13 | 56 | 49 | 1.143 | 30 | |
| 10 | Eastbourne | 30 | 9 | 9 | 12 | 53 | 67 | 0.791 | 27 | |
| 11 | Wokingham Town | 30 | 8 | 6 | 16 | 50 | 62 | 0.806 | 22 | |
| 12 | Uxbridge | 30 | 6 | 9 | 15 | 48 | 59 | 0.814 | 21 | |
| 13 | Harlow Town | 30 | 6 | 6 | 18 | 37 | 66 | 0.561 | 18 | |
| 14 | Wembley | 30 | 5 | 6 | 19 | 31 | 66 | 0.470 | 16 | |
| 15 | Dorking | 30 | 5 | 5 | 20 | 31 | 92 | 0.337 | 15 | |
| 16 | Epsom & Ewell (R) | 30 | 6 | 3 | 21 | 52 | 93 | 0.559 | 13 (Note: Epsom & Ewell deducted 2 points) | Relegation to Division Two |

Source: rsssf.com
Rules for classification: 1) points; 2) goal ratio.
(C) Champions; (P) Promoted; (R) Relegated

=== Stadia and locations ===
Locations of the Athenian League Division One clubs
Greater London Athenian League Division One football clubs

| Club | Stadium |
|---|---|
| Chesham United | The Meadow |
| Dorking | Meadowbank Stadium |
| Eastbourne | The Saffrons |
| Epsom & Ewell | Merland Rise |
| Erith & Belvedere | Park View |
| Harlow Town | Harlow Sportcentre |
| Harrow Town | Earlsmead Stadium |
| Hemel Hempstead | Vauxhall Road |
| Hertford Town | Hertingfordbury Park |
| Horsham | Queen Street |
| Letchworth Town | Baldock Road |
| Slough Town | Wexham Park |
| Tilbury | Chadfields |
| Uxbridge | Honeycroft |
| Wembley | Vale Farm |
| Wokingham Town | Cantley Park |

== Division Two ==
Athenian League Division Two
- Season: 1964–65
- Champions: Harwich & Parkeston
- Promoted: Harwich & Parkeston; Bishop's Stortford
- Relegated: None

The division joined 6 new teams:

- Harwich & Parkeston, from Eastern Counties League
- Croydon Amateurs, from Spartan League
- Herne Bay, from Aetolian League
- Eastbourne United, from Metropolitan League
- Cheshunt, from Spartan League
- Rainham Town, from Metropolitan League

=== League table ===
| Pos | Team | Pld | W | D | L | GF | GA | GR | Pts | Promotion |
|---|---|---|---|---|---|---|---|---|---|---|
| 1 | Harwich & Parkeston (C, P) | 30 | 24 | 2 | 4 | 95 | 33 | 2.879 | 50 | Promotion to Division One |
| 2 | Bishop's Stortford (P) | 30 | 20 | 8 | 2 | 71 | 35 | 2.029 | 48 | Promotion to Division One |
| 3 | Ware | 30 | 21 | 5 | 4 | 81 | 42 | 1.929 | 47 | |
| 4 | Aveley | 30 | 18 | 6 | 6 | 62 | 32 | 1.938 | 42 | |
| 5 | Windsor & Eton | 30 | 17 | 4 | 9 | 80 | 45 | 1.778 | 38 | |
| 6 | Herne Bay | 30 | 18 | 2 | 10 | 80 | 53 | 1.509 | 38 | |
| 7 | Croydon Amateurs | 30 | 16 | 4 | 10 | 63 | 38 | 1.658 | 36 | |
| 8 | Eastbourne United | 30 | 13 | 8 | 9 | 70 | 43 | 1.628 | 34 | |
| 9 | Cheshunt | 30 | 13 | 7 | 10 | 60 | 41 | 1.463 | 33 | |
| 10 | Edmonton | 30 | 10 | 4 | 16 | 40 | 64 | 0.625 | 24 | |
| 11 | Berkhamsted Town | 30 | 8 | 5 | 17 | 44 | 79 | 0.557 | 21 | |
| 12 | Rainham Town | 30 | 7 | 5 | 18 | 41 | 67 | 0.612 | 19 | |
| 13 | Aylesbury United | 30 | 6 | 5 | 19 | 41 | 73 | 0.562 | 17 | |
| 14 | Wingate | 30 | 6 | 2 | 22 | 39 | 77 | 0.506 | 14 | |
| 15 | Brentwood & Warley | 30 | 4 | 5 | 21 | 32 | 79 | 0.405 | 13 | Left to join Metropolitan League |
| 16 | Histon | 30 | 2 | 2 | 26 | 27 | 125 | 0.216 | 6 | Left to join Eastern Counties League |

Source: rsssf.com
Rules for classification: 1) points; 2) goal ratio.
(C) Champions; (P) Promoted

=== Stadia and locations ===
Locations of the Athenian League Division Two clubs
Greater London Athenian League Division Two football clubs

| Club | Stadium |
|---|---|
| Aveley | The Mill Field |
| Aylesbury United | Buckingham Road |
| Berkhamsted Town | Broadwater |
| Bishop's Stortford | Woodside Park |
| Brentwood & Warley | The Brentwood Centre Arena |
| Cheshunt | Cheshunt Stadium |
| Croydon Amateurs | Croydon Sports Arena |
| Eastbourne United | The Oval |
| Edmonton | Coles Park |
| Harwich & Parkeston | Royal Oak |
| Herne Bay | Winch's Field |
| Histon | Bridge Road |
| Rainham Town | Deri Park |
| Ware | Wodson Park |
| Windsor & Eton | Stag Meadow |
| Wingate | Hall Lane |
