= 1948–49 Sussex County Football League =

Sussex County Football League
- Season: 1948–49
- Champions: Bognor Regis
- Matches played: 182
- Goals scored: 843 (4.63 per match)

The 1948–49 Sussex County Football League season was the 24th in the history of the competition.

== League table ==
The league featured 14 clubs, 13 which competed in the last season, along with one new club:

- Lancing Athletic

Chichester added City to the club name.

=== League table ===
Pos	Team	Pld	W	D	L	GF	GA	GR	Pts	Qualification or relegation
1	Bognor Regis	26	20	2	4	85	44	1.932	42	
2	Horsham	26	19	3	4	81	32	2.531	41	
3	Southwick	26	19	1	6	70	36	1.944	39	
4	Bexhill Town Athletic	26	14	4	8	64	42	1.524	32	
5	Haywards Heath	26	12	4	10	58	41	1.415	28	
6	Littlehampton Town	26	13	2	11	67	55	1.218	28	
7	Lancing Athletic	26	13	1	12	70	58	1.207	27	
8	Eastbourne Comrades	26	11	4	11	54	62	0.871	26	
9	East Grinstead	26	10	0	16	58	77	0.753	20	
10	Newhaven	26	8	4	14	54	78	0.692	20	
11	Lewes	26	7	4	15	52	84	0.619	18	
12	Chichester City	26	8	1	17	42	69	0.609	17	
13	Shoreham	26	5	5	16	41	68	0.603	15	
14	Hove	26	5	1	20	47	97	0.485	11	Founder members of Metropolitan League

Source: Non-League Matters
Rules for classification: 1) points; 2) goal difference; 3) number of goals scored.
The points system until the 1982–83 season: 2 points for a win, 1 point for a draw and 0 points for losing.
