= John Seaden =

English footballer

Personal information
- Full name: John Charles Seaden
- Date of birth: 4 June 1967 (age 59)
- Place of birth: Southend-on-Sea, England
- Height: 5 ft 8 in (1.73 m)
- Position: Midfielder

Youth career
- Southend United

Senior career*
| Years | Team | Apps | (Gls) |
| 1985–1986 | Southend United | 18 | (1) |
| 1986–1987 | Chelmsford City | 4 | (1) |
- Barking
- Stambridge United

Managerial career
- Southend Manor
- * Club domestic league appearances and goals

John Charles Seaden (born 4 June 1967) is an English former footballer who played as a midfielder.

== Club career ==
Seaden came through the youth ranks at Southend United, making 18 appearances for the club in the Football League, scoring once. Following his time at Southend, Seaden played for Chelmsford City and Barking.

== Managerial career ==
During the 1990s, Seaden managed Essex Senior League club Southend Manor.

== Personal life ==
Seaden's son, Harry, played in the Football League for Southend and also represented England under-17's.
