= Alan Brazil =

Scottish broadcaster and footballer (born 1959)

Personal information
- Full name: Alan Bernard Brazil
- Date of birth: 15 June 1959 (age 67)
- Place of birth: Govan, Glasgow, Scotland
- Height: 1.83 m (6 ft 0 in)
- Position: Forward

Youth career
- Celtic Boys Club

Senior career*
Years	Team	Apps	(Gls)
1976–1983	Ipswich Town	154	(70)
1978	→ Detroit Express (loan)	21	(9)
1983–1984	Tottenham Hotspur	31	(9)
1984–1986	Manchester United	31	(8)
1986	Coventry City	15	(2)
1986	Queens Park Rangers	4	(1)
1987	Witham Town	25	(10)
1988	Wollongong City	12	(4)
1988	Chelmsford City	7	(3)
1988–1989	FC Baden	6	(4)
1989–1990	Stambridge United		
- Felixstowe Town
- Achilles
1991	Wivenhoe Town	1	(1)
Total		307	(120)

International career
1979–1981	Scotland U21	8	(1)
1980–1983	Scotland	13	(1)
- * Club domestic league appearances and goals

Alan Bernard Brazil (born 15 June 1959) is a Scottish broadcaster and former footballer who played as a forward. He most notably played for Ipswich Town, Tottenham Hotspur and Manchester United, and represented Scotland in international football. He was forced to retire due to a recurring back injury, and then moved into media presentation. He initially worked on television, before moving over to radio where he has for many years been a presenter on Talksport.

== Playing career ==
=== Club career ===
Born in 1959 in the Govan district of Glasgow, Brazil started his career in England with Ipswich Town in 1977, where he stayed until 1983, appearing a total of 210 times and scoring 80 goals. In 1978, he was loaned to the Detroit Express in the North American Soccer League, appearing in 21 regular season games and 3 playoff games, scoring 10 goals in total. He made his Ipswich debut in a league match against Manchester United on 14 January 1978, and also contributed to their victorious 1977–78 FA Cup run when he played against Bristol Rovers in the fifth round replay. However, he was left out of the squad for the final itself.

Brazil was a key player by the 1980–81 season, when they won the UEFA Cup and finished runners-up in the league. Ipswich finished runners-up once more the following season, when Brazil scored 22 goals, making him the second-highest scorer in the First Division after Kevin Keegan, who scored 26 for Southampton. One of his finest games in an Ipswich shirt came on 16 February 1982, when he scored all of their goals in a 5–2 league win over Southampton.

Brazil moved to Tottenham Hotspur in March 1983 for £425,000, scoring six times in 10 appearances. In his only full season at White Hart Lane he scored three goals in 19 games, while his fellow Scot Steve Archibald scored 21 times. Tottenham won the UEFA Cup and Brazil scored four goals during their cup run, however he was not part of the squad for the final. In June 1984 Brazil joined Manchester United for a fee of £625,000. He stayed with United for two seasons, but a recurring back injury restricted him to a total of 41 appearances in the league, the League Cup, the FA Cup and the UEFA Cup. Competition for places at Old Trafford was very fierce, with Irish International Frank Stapleton, Mark Hughes and (initially, before his move into midfield) Norman Whiteside all in contention. Brazil scored 16 goals during his 18 months with Manchester United, but by the time his second season got underway, he was no longer a regular member of the first team, with most his final appearances for the club coming as a substitute.

In January 1986, he was transferred to Coventry City as part of the deal that sent Terry Gibson to Old Trafford. He made 15 league appearances, scoring twice, and was given a free transfer at the end of the season, with his back problems becoming more evident. Joining Queens Park Rangers, he made a total of four appearances, scoring once (the winner against Blackburn in the League Cup), and went on to play for Bury Town, Chelmsford City and Stambridge United. Brazil left British football in 1988 to join Wollongong City (now the South Coast Wolves), a New South Wales-based club in Australia's National Soccer League. He returned to Europe to spend the 1988–89 season with FC Baden of the Swiss Challenge League in the country's second division.

Suffering from a back injury, Brazil's career wound down with stints at Felixstowe Town, Ipswich-based side Achilles and Wivenhoe Town, where Brazil scored on his only appearance for the club in a 2–1 loss against Bromley on 15 October 1991, before rejoining Chelmsford City to play for their reserves. Brazil later played under Garry Hill at Chelmsford Sunday League side Priory Sports, alongside Micky Droy and Paul Parker.

=== International career ===
Brazil made 13 appearances for Scotland, the most notable of which saw him playing in the 1982 FIFA World Cup finals in Spain. He was the youngest member of the Scotland squad at the finals. His debut came against Poland in a friendly in Warsaw on 28 May 1980, which Scotland lost 1–0. His last full international came on 1 June 1983 in a 2–0 Home Championship defeat to England. He scored once for the Scottish national side, in his penultimate appearance on 28 May 1983 in a 2–0 Home Championship win over Wales.

His international appearances were limited as Scotland had a number of other strikers at this time such as Kenny Dalglish, Charlie Nicholas, Mo Johnston, Steve Archibald, Paul Sturrock, Joe Jordan, Frank McAvennie, Davie Dodds, Frank McGarvey and Andy Gray who were preferred to Brazil.

== Media career ==
Brazil was a sports analyst for breakfast TV station GMTV in its early days. Soon afterwards, he was invited to join Andy Gray in The Boot Room on Sky Sports. When Sky Sports gained rights to the Football League and the Football League Cup, Brazil worked as a studio analyst and, occasionally, as a co-commentator.

He later worked as a co-commentator on matches covered by Anglia TV in the 2001–02 season.

In the late 1990s, Brazil joined radio station Talk Radio UK to present evening sports programming, titled "It's Just Like Watching Brazil". When the station became talkSPORT in early 2000, he became co-presenter on the weekday 6 – 10 am programme. The show has since been renamed the 'Alan Brazil Sports Breakfast'. He has had various co-presenters over the years, including Mike Parry, Graham Beecroft and Ronnie Irani. Since Irani left the show in 2013, there has been a variety of co-presenters including Matt Holland, Ray Parlour, David Ginola, Dominic Cork, Neil Warnock and Brian Moore.

Brazil missed a show in March 2004 and was dismissed by the station, but he was reinstated three weeks later.

While reacting to the death of actor Robin Williams in August 2014, Brazil said on his talkSPORT show that he did not have a lot of sympathy for people who commit suicide as it leaves their families in a "diabolical" situation. Many listeners criticised Brazil for not showing any regard for Williams having suffered from depression. The station apologised for offence caused and said it did not agree with his opinion.

From April 2020 Brazil's role at Talksport was altered with him hosting Talksport Breakfast two days a week on Thursdays and Fridays with Laura Woods becoming host of the show from Monday to Wednesday with a statement from station stressing that Brazil's role at Talksport would be 'expanded'. Starting from December 2023 following the arrival of Jeff Stelling at Talksport, Brazil began hosting Talksport's main breakfast show for three days a week (up from two) from Wednesday to Friday alongside rotating co-hosts whilst Stelling serves as host of the breakfast show on Monday and Tuesdays.

On 6 February 2025, during an on air discussion about his former club Manchester United, Brazil commented that football fans would "not be bothered" about Manchester United's women's team. The comments received an almost immediate on air rebuke from his co-host Shebahn Aherne who branded him "a dinosaur".

== Personal life ==
In the early 1970s, Brazil was subject to abuse at Celtic Boys Club, by Jim Torbett. When Torbett was charged and tried in 1996, Brazil was a witness for the prosecution. Torbett was found guilty on child abuse charges and sentenced to two years in prison.

Having retired from English league football aged 27 due to injury, for several years in the 1990s Brazil ran the Black Adder pub in Ipswich. This business venture failed and Brazil was declared bankrupt.

A fan of horse racing, in 2003 he formed the Alan Brazil Racing Club based at Newmarket near to his home in Suffolk. In 2006 Brazil published a book co-written with Mike Parry called There's an Awful Lot of Bubbly in Brazil. This was followed in 2007 by Both Barrels from Brazil: My War Against the Numpties, again co-written with Parry.

In September 2007, Brazil was arrested near Bury St Edmunds in Suffolk on suspicion of drink-driving. He was convicted, banned from driving for 20 months, and given a £750 fine, as well as being ordered to pay £450 compensation to the court.

In 2011, Brazil brought out a range of bar nuts named 'Alan Brazil's Nuts', a play on Brazil nuts. The packages have barcodes readable by smartphones for accessing Talksport-related media. The nuts are produced at an Intersnack factory in Haverhill, Suffolk, with profits going to the Sir Bobby Robson Foundation. Robson, who died from cancer in 2009, was Brazil's manager at Ipswich. The range of salted and dry roasted peanuts were due to be extended to cashews and chilli nuts in 2012.

In 2020, Brazil's autobiography Only Here for a Visit: A Life Lived to the Full was published by Bantam Press.

In 2026, Brazil underwent a liver transplant at Addenbrooke's Hospital, which he described as a 'miracle'.

== Career statistics ==
Appearances and goals by club, season and competition
Club	Season	League			FA Cup		League Cup		Europe		Total	
Club	Season	Division	Apps	Goals	Apps	Goals	Apps	Goals	Apps	Goals	Apps	Goals
Ipswich Town	1977–78	First Division	2	0	0	0	0	0	–		2	0
Ipswich Town	1978–79	First Division	19	9	1	0	0	0	2 (Note: Appearances in European Cup Winners' Cup)	0	22	9
Ipswich Town	1979–80	First Division	35	12	1	0	0	0	3 (Note: Appearances in UEFA Cup)	0	39	12
Ipswich Town	1980–81	First Division	35	17	7	0	4	0	12	1	58	18
Ipswich Town	1981–82	First Division	35	22	3	3	3	2	2	0	43	27
Ipswich Town	1982–83	First Division	28	10	0	0	2	0	2	0	32	10
Ipswich Town	Total		154	70	12	3	9	2	21	1	196	76
Tottenham Hotspur	1982–83	First Division	12	6	–		–		–		12	6
Tottenham Hotspur	1983–84	First Division	19	3	1	0	1	0	5	4	26	7
Tottenham Hotspur	Total		31	9	1	0	1	0	5	4	38	13
Manchester United	1984–85	First Division	19	5	1	0	2	3	2	1	24	9
Manchester United	1985–86	First Division	11	3	0	0	7 (Note: Three appearances in League Cup, four appearances in Football League Super Cup)	0	0	0	18	3
Manchester United	Total		30	8	1	0	9	3	2	1	42	12
Career total			215	87	14	3	19	5	28	6	276	101

== Honours ==
Ipswich Town

- FA Cup: 1977–78
- UEFA Cup: 1980–81

Tottenham Hotspur

- UEFA Cup: 1983–84

Individual

- Ipswich Town Player of the Year: 1981–82
- Ipswich Town Hall of Fame: Inducted 2013

Preceded by Adrian Durham	talkSPORT breakfast show host 2001–2004 with Mike Parry; 2000–2004	Succeeded by Mike Parry and Paul Breen-Turner
Preceded by Mike Parry and Paul Breen-Turner	talkSPORT breakfast show host April 2004 – June 2004 with Mike Parry; June 2004 – September 2007 with Graham Beecroft; September 2007 with Ronnie Irani (2007– with Mike Parry on Mondays); 2004–	Succeeded by Incumbent
