= 1951–52 Sussex County Football League =

Sussex County Football League
- Season: 1951–52
- Champions: Shoreham
- Matches played: 210
- Goals scored: 975 (4.64 per match)

The 1951–52 Sussex County Football League season was the 27th in the history of the competition.

== League table ==
The league featured 15 clubs, 13 which competed in the last season, along with two new clubs:

- Brighton Old Grammarians
- Crawley

Eastbourne Comrades changed name to Eastbourne United.

=== League table ===
Pos	Team	Pld	W	D	L	GF	GA	GR	Pts	Qualification or relegation
1	Shoreham	28	16	5	7	79	43	1.837	37	
2	Bognor Regis Town	28	15	5	8	71	50	1.420	35	
3	Brighton Old Grammarians	28	14	5	9	63	50	1.260	33	
4	Haywards Heath	28	12	8	8	68	48	1.417	32	Joined Metropolitan League
5	Southwick	28	13	6	9	70	56	1.250	32	Joined Metropolitan League
6	Bexhill Town Athletic	28	14	4	10	55	48	1.146	32	
7	Lancing Athletic	28	11	8	9	68	56	1.214	30	
8	East Grinstead	28	12	5	11	78	73	1.068	29	
9	Chichester City	28	13	2	13	76	72	1.056	28	
10	Lewes	28	11	5	12	65	76	0.855	27	
11	Arundel	28	8	10	10	59	44	1.341	26	
12	Eastbourne United	28	9	8	11	51	54	0.944	26	
13	Crawley	28	7	7	14	57	89	0.640	21	
14	Newhaven	28	5	8	15	53	107	0.495	18	
15	Littlehampton Town	28	5	4	19	62	109	0.569	14	

Source: Non-League Matters
Rules for classification: 1) points; 2) goal difference; 3) number of goals scored.
The points system until the 1982–83 season: 2 points for a win, 1 point for a draw and 0 points for losing.
