= Mike Parry =

English journalist and radio presenter (born 1954)

- Born: Michael Alan Newton-Parry; 29 December 1954 (age 71); Chester, Cheshire, England
- Other name: Porky

Michael Alan Newton-Parry (born 29 December 1954) is an English broadcaster and former journalist.

== Early life ==
Born in Chester, Parry attended The King's School via a scholarship and later completed his education at Trent Polytechnic, now known as Nottingham Trent University.

== Journalism career ==
After graduating, Parry became a "Fleet Street reporter" and worked for tabloid newspapers, including The Sun. In the late 1990s, he served as News Editor of the Daily Express and later as News Editor of the Press Association. He then became a Press Officer for the Football Association.

Parry has written three books. His first, Rooney Tunes, is a biography of footballer Wayne Rooney, published in 2006. He co-wrote two autobiographies of his fellow Talksport presenter Alan Brazil: There's an Awful Lot of Bubbly in Brazil (2007) and Both Barrels from Brazil: My War On the Numpties (2008).

== Radio ==
In 1999, Parry joined Talk Radio (later known as talkSPORT) as breakfast show presenter, becoming programme director in 2001. He originally co-presented the Sports Breakfast with Alan Brazil, but after experiencing health problems in 2004, he was replaced by Graham Beecroft and later by Ronnie Irani.

Following an improvement in his health, Parry returned to co-host The Alan Brazil Sports Breakfast show on Monday and Friday mornings, and sometimes stood in for Irani when he was unavailable. In 2009, he began presenting the 10:00–13:00 slot with Andy Townsend from Monday to Friday.

From June 2010, Parry co-hosted with Mike Graham in the same slot. In July 2010, their slot was moved form weekends to weekdays under the name Parry and Graham. They were replaced by Richard Keys and Andy Gray in February 2011.

He stood in for regular presenter Mark Chapman on 606 on Radio 5 Live on 19 February 2011 and again on 2 April 2011 alongside Robbie Savage.

In October 2013, Parry returned to broadcast alongside Graham in "The Two Mikes", an "Extra Time" segment where they would debate "a host of issues". This evolved into a regular three-hour-slot headlined as The Two Mikes, which ran from 1a.m. to 4 a.m. In April 2019, The Two Mikes disbanded following a fallout between the hosts, some of which played out publicly on Twitter (before it rebranded as X). Their last radio show on talkSPORT was aired between 10 p.m. and 1 a.m. on 29 March 2019.

Parry presented the Saturday lunchtime 'Warm-Up' show on talkSPORT from mid-2017 to August 2019. During this period, he had various co-hosts, including Brazil, Graham, Danny Kelly, and Jason Cundy. Parry left talkSPORT after 20 years in August 2019. He finished his final show by saying: "I think I'll end with words similar to those from the immortal John Lennon - 'thank you very much indeed for listening, folks, and I hope I passed the audition'".

From 2020 to 2021, he presented weekend shows on talkRADIO.

== Television ==
Parry began his television career as the co-presenter of the Sports Tonight Live show with Chris Cohen, which was broadcast on Freeview channel 112 (internet connection required) and online. However, Sports Tonight Live went bankrupt.

Since 2018, Parry has made regular guest appearances on Jeremy Vine, a topical discussion programme broadcast by Channel 5. During an appearance on 1 October 2021, in a debate about protests by environmental activist group Insulate Britain, Parry stated: "The problem in this country in all areas is that minorities always get the upper hand because we're so tolerant, and minorities have to be squashed, like that... so that the rest of society can operate normally", while slamming his hand on the desk. After receiving criticism from some social media users, Parry said that his comments were "directly aimed at the M25 protesters and other minority groups who've had a disproportionate effect on life", stating: "To link my 'minorities' comment to ethnicity is just silly."

Parry has also made a number of appearances on GB News.

== Personal life ==
In 2004, Parry suffered heart failure and was treated at Harefield Hospital. Later that year, he was diagnosed with advanced dilated cardiomyopathy and placed on the transplant list. However, in April 2005, due to a combination of drug treatment and improvements in Parry's digestion and exercise, leading to a weight loss of 4 stone (56 lb; 25 kg) in six months, he was removed from the transplant list.

Parry is a lifelong supporter of Everton Football Club and is also a minority shareholder in the club.

Preceded by Alan Brazil	Talksport breakfast show host 2001 – June 2004; With: Alan Brazil	Succeeded by Alan Brazil and Graham Beecroft
