= London Paper Mills F.C. =

English football club

London Paper Mills F.C. was an English association football club which participated in the Kent Football League and the FA Cup.
