= Twickenham F.C. =

Twickenham
- Full name: Twickenham Football Club
- Ground: The Beveree Stadium, Hampton

Twickenham Football Club was a football club based in Hampton, England.

== History ==
In 1945, Twickenham became founder members of the Corinthian League. After an eighth-place finish in the league's first season, Twickenham left the league. The following year, the club entered the FA Cup for the first time, losing 2–1 against Acton Town in the extra preliminary round. In 1949, Twickenham became founded members of the Metropolitan & District League, playing four seasons in the competition, before leaving in 1953. In 1953, the club joined the Parthenon League, winning the league in 1959. Twickenham remained in the Parthenon League, until its dissolution in 1966.

== Ground ==
In the early days of the club, Twickenham played at Ivy Bridge. In 1952, Twickenham moved into The Beveree Stadium in Hampton. Twickenham vacated the ground in 1959, following Hampton's acquisition of the site's tenancy.

== Records ==
- Best FA Cup performance: Preliminary round, 1947–48, 1948–49

== Ted Lasso ==
While not part of the club's history, Twickenham was mentioned in season 4 as a turnoff to the long term prospects of a woman's side. This comment is in no way related to the club.
