= Stambridge United F.C. =

Association football club in England

Stambridge United
- Full name: Stambridge United Football Club
- Founded: 1888
- Dissolved: 2015
- Ground: Stambridge Memorial Ground, Stambridge

Stambridge United F.C. was an English football club based in Stambridge, near Rochford in Essex. The club were members of Division Three of the Essex Olympian League and play at the Stambridge Memorial Ground.

== History ==
The club was established in 1888 by members of Rankin's Cricket Club, and played in the local District league from 1896, winning the league in 1906–07 season. In 1988 the club joined the Essex Senior League. However, they withdrew at the end of the 1991–92 season and dropped into Division One of the Essex Intermediate League (later the Olympian League). After finishing bottom of Division One in 1997–98 they were relegated to Division Two, and were relegated again the following season after finishing second from bottom. In 2001 the club was renamed Stambridge United, and won Division Three in the first season under their new name, and were promoted to Division Two. However, they finished bottom of Division Two the following season and were relegated back to Division Three. After finishing second in 2004–05 they were promoted to Division Two again.

The club folded during the 2008–09 season, but was reformed in time to join the Southend Borough Combination for the 2009–10 season. They won Division One at the first attempt and were promoted to the Premier Division. After finishing as runners-up the following season, they were promoted to Division Three of the Olympian League. The 2011–12 season saw the club make it to the final of the Essex Saturday Premier Cup, but miss out to Newbury Forest 4–1.

== Honours ==
- Essex Olympian League Division Three
  - Winners: 2001–02
- Southend Combination
  - Division One champions 2009–10

== Records ==
- Highest League Position: 6th in Essex Senior League 1989–90, 1990–91

== Former players ==
Former professional players to play for the club include:

- Alan Brazil
- Garry Nelson
- John Seaden
