= Willesden F.C. =

Willesden
- Full name: Willesden Football Club
- Dissolved: 1981
- Ground: King Edwards Park or Willesden Sports Centre
- 1980–81: Isthmian League Division Two, 17/20

Willesden F.C. was an English football club based in Willesden, London. The club played at King Edwards Park and Willesden Sports Centre.

== History ==
The club entered the FA cup for the first time in the 1947–48 season, when it lost to Leavesden 7–1 in an away game. In 1948 the club joined the Spartan League, but left after two seasons. They were founder members of the Delphian League in 1951, but left the league at the end of the 1952–53 season after finishing bottom. They later joined the London League and then joined the Aetolian League when it was established in 1959. They left the league at the end of the 1962–63 season and joined the Spartan League. In 1966 they joined the Premier Division of the Greater London League, but finished bottom and were relegated to Division Two in their first season. In 1967–68 they won Division Two and were promoted back to (a renamed) Division One. When the league merged into the Metropolitan–London League in 1971, Willesden were placed in Division One. In 1974 they transferred to Division Two the Athenian League, and two years later they joined Division Two of the Isthmian League.

In 1978, the club had a dispute with Brent Council over the rental payments for playing at the Willesden Sports Centre Stadium. The Council wanted to raise the rental from £150 per year to £2,083. Moreover, the council had concerns about the financial viability of the club. The club left the Isthmian league at the end of the 1980–81 season, when it finished 17th out of 20.

== Honours ==
- Greater London League
  - Division Two champions 1967–68

== Records ==
- Best FA Cup performance: First qualifying round second replay, 1979–80
- Best FA Vase performance: First round replay 1974–75

== See also ==
- Willesden F.C. players
