= Kent Football League (1894–1959) =

The Kent League was a football league which existed from 1894 until 1959, based in the English county of Kent. Another, unrelated, Kent League was formed in 1966, and is now known as the Southern Counties East Football League.

== History ==
The league was established by the Kent County Football Association in February 1894. The initial proposal for a twelve-team league was subsequently changed to a nine-member Division I with the addition of a similar-sized Division II, with promotion and relegation decided by a play-off between the bottom two clubs in Division I against the two top clubs in Division II. For the first three seasons of the competition the champions of Division I were awarded the Kent County Challenge Cup, which had previously been presented to the Kent County FA knock-out tournament (Kent Cup) winners. The Division II champions were awarded a new trophy, the Kent County Challenge Shield. From 1897, after the Kent County Challenge Cup returned to being the trophy for the knock-out tournament (now the Kent Senior Cup), the shield was used as the trophy for the Division I champions.

The nine clubs who formed the inaugural Division I for the 1894–95 season were Chatham, Sheppey United, Dartford, Gravesend United, Sittingbourne, Ashford United, Folkestone, Maidstone United and the Training Battalion of the Royal Engineers. The latter two replaced Royal Ordnance Factories, who withdrew, and New Brompton, who withdrew after adopting professionalism. Division II also commenced with nine clubs: Sevenoaks, Dover, Faversham, Swanscombe, Cray Wanderers, Folkestone Harveians, Chatham Reserves, Sheppey United Reserves and Sittingbourne Reserves. The latter two replaced Bromley and Rochester Defiance who had been originally selected. The inaugural Division 1 winners were Chatham; the inaugural Division 2 winners were Swanscombe.

For the second season, after the league voted in January 1895 to allow professionalism, Division I expanded to twelve clubs with the addition of New Brompton (who used it as a supplementary league while also competing in the Southern League), Woolwich Arsenal Reserves and Northfleet. Before the start of the following 1896–97 season, eight clubs left the league (primarily to the Southern League), and by the commencement of the 1897–98 season the league had only 15 members across its two divisions, leading to the amalgamation of the divisions into a single Division I for the following season. There were further reductions in members and by 1910 there were only nine members (five of whom left at the end of the season).

The league was reconstructed for the 1910–11 season under the auspices of the KCFA, which had relinquished their role on the management committee a decade previously. Two regional second divisions (East and West) were added, drawing their members from the top clubs of the East Kent and West Kent leagues. As a result, the league expanded to 32 clubs; twelve in Division I, with the Division II East and West divisions having eleven and nine members respectively. As part of the reconstruction, reserve teams of Kent and South London clubs playing in the Southern League were invited to enter the Kent League. As a consequence of these stronger teams being introduced, between 1911 and 1914 the Division I championship was won by two of these teams – Millwall Reserves on three successive occasions and then Crystal Palace Reserves.

In March 1923 informal discussions took place concerning a knock-out Kent League Cup competition for the Division I teams. This came to fruition and in the 1923–24 season Northfleet United were the first winners of the competition. Apart from a five-season hiatus owing to World War I the league structure remained broadly the same until 1928, albeit with a churn of clubs. In 1923 the Division II Western Section became part of the Kent County Amateur League and a new Mid-Kent Section (effectively replacing the Western Section) was added at Division II level; while the Division II Eastern Section, having had just three members in 1923–24, was suspended for three seasons before being reintroduced for the 1927–28 season, when the league comprised 26 clubs, 14 in Division I with just three in the East Section and nine in the Mid-Kent Section of Division II.

With the lack of clubs at the Division II level, the two sections were merged into a single division in 1928. The league continued in this format until its demise in 1959 apart from two seasons between 1935 and 1937 when Division II was temporarily discontinued in preference to it being part of the Kent County Amateur League, after which it was reinstated. Both divisions were suspended in September 1939 following the outbreak of World War II: Division I was restarted in 1944–45, but Division II did not return until 1946–47.

In April 1958 Folkestone Town and Dover, two of the larger clubs, indicated their intention to leave the Kent League and join the expanding Southern League, with Bexleyheath & Welling and Tunbridge Wells United doing the same shortly afterwards. Although, owing to contractual arrangements, the clubs had to play in the Kent League for the 1958–59 season, the number of rebel clubs expanded to eight with the addition of Ashford Town, Margate, Ramsgate Athletic and Sittingbourne. As a consequence, in December 1958 the Kent County FA stated they were unwilling to continue the Kent League and would be disbandingit after 65 years of existence at the end of the season.

At the time of disbanding, the league had 18 clubs in both Division I and Division II. Of the Division I clubs, the eight wantaway teams (who were mostly the top clubs in the final Kent League table) joined Division One of the Southern League; seven clubs joined the new Aetolian League (Snowdown Colliery Welfare, Herne Bay, Chatham Town, Faversham Town, Sheppey United, Whitstable and Deal Town), while Canterbury City joined the Metropolitan League, Betteshanger Colliery Welfare joined the Seanglian League (a lower division of the Aetolian League to which some of the ex-Kent League clubs' reserves teams from Division II had migrated) and Gillingham Reserves joined the Football Combination.

=== Later Kent League ===
A new Kent League was established seven years later. In the 1966–67 season the Kent Premier League was formed, derived from the Thames & Medway Combination. The word 'Premier' was dropped the following season. The new league did not attract back the clubs from the Southern League but was taken up by some of the clubs that had formed the Aetolian and Seanglian Leagues. In 2013 the new league was renamed the Southern Counties East Football League.

== Champions and League Cup winners ==
The champions of the league's divisions and League Cup winners were as follows:

Season	Division I	Division II		League Cup
1894–95	Chatham	Swanscombe		–
1895–96	Northfleet	Faversham		–
1896–97	Woolwich Arsenal Reserves	New Brompton Reserves		–
1897–98	Swanscombe	Sittingbourne Reserves		–
1898–99	Maidstone United	–		–
1899–1900	Maidstone United	–		–
1900–01	Maidstone United	–		–
1901–02	Cray Wanderers	–		–
1902–03	Sittingbourne	–		–
1903–04	Chatham	–		–
1904–05	Chatham	–		–
1905–06	Sheppey United	–		–
1906–07	Sheppey United	–		–
1907–08	Northfleet United	–		–
1908–09	Northfleet United	–		–
Season	Division I	Division II East	Division II West	League Cup
1909–10	Northfleet United	2nd Royal Irish Rifles	Orpington	–
1910–11	Millwall Reserves	1st North Staffordshire Regiment	Army Service Corps (Grove Park)	–
1911–12	Millwall Reserves	Ashford Railway Works	Army Service Corps (Grove Park)	–
1912–13	Millwall Reserves	Ashford Railway Works	2nd Royal Dublin Fusiliers	–
1913–14	Crystal Palace Reserves	Ashford Railway Works	Strood	–
1914–19	Competition suspended due to World War I			
1919–20	Northfleet United	Ashford Railway Works	Depot Battalion Royal Engineers (Chatham)	–
1920–21	Charlton Athletic Reserves	Depot Machine Gun Corps (Folkestone)	Maidstone United Reserves	–
1921–22	Maidstone United	Dover United	Maidstone United Reserves	–
1922–23	Maidstone United	Dover United	Maidstone United Reserves	–
Season	Division I	Division II East	Division II Mid-Kent	League Cup
1923–24	Charlton Athletic 'A'	Dover United	Chatham Reserves	Northfleet United
1924–25	Chatham	–	1st Royal Warwickshire	Dartford
1925–26	Northfleet United	–	Minster United	Sittingbourne
1926–27	Chatham	–	Chatham Reserves / RAF Eastchurch (joint)	Royal Naval Depot (Chatham)
1927–28	Sheppey United	Ashford Railway Works	Whitstable	Sittingbourne Paper Mills
Season	Division I	Division II		League Cup
1928–29	Bexleyheath Town	RAF Eastchurch		Folkestone
1929–30	Gillingham Reserves	Aylesford Paper Mills		Folkestone
1930–31	Tunbridge Wells Rangers	Aylesford Paper Mills		Gillingham Reserves
1931–32	Northfleet United	Aylesford Paper Mills		Northfleet United
1932–33	Margate	Sheppey United Reserves		Tunbridge Wells Rangers
1933–34	London Paper Mills	Whitstable		Tunbridge Wells Rangers
1934–35	Northfleet United	Chatham		Northfleet United
1935–36	Northfleet United	–		Margate
1936–37	Northfleet United	–		Northfleet United
1937–38	Margate	Margate Reserves		Northfleet United
1938–39	Northfleet United	Dover		Ashford
1939–44	Competition suspended due to World War II			
1944–45	Gillingham	–		Snowdown Colliery Welfare
1945–46	Gillingham	–		Gillingham
1946–47	Margate	Aylesford Paper Mills		Folkestone Town
1947–48	Margate	Folkestone Town Reserves		Margate
1948–49	Ashford	Folkestone Town Reserves		Ramsgate Athletic
1949–50	Ramsgate Athletic	Whitstable		Canterbury City
1950–51	Folkestone Town	Folkestone Town Reserves		Snowdown Colliery Welfare
1951–52	Dover	Dover Reserves		Folkestone Town
1952–53	Folkestone Town	Ashford Town Reserves		Tunbridge Wells United
1953–54	Deal Town	Margate Reserves		Margate
1954–55	Snowdown Colliery Welfare	Herne Bay		Tunbridge Wells United
1955–56	Ramsgate Athletic	Ashford Town Reserves		Gillingham Reserves
1956–57	Ramsgate Athletic	Margate Reserves		Dover
1957–58	Sittingbourne	Folkestone Town Reserves		Deal Town
1958–59	Sittingbourne	Gravesend & Northfleet Reserves		Sittingbourne

== Member clubs ==
During the league's history, member clubs included:

- 12th Infantry Training Corps
- 1st King's Own
- 1st North Staffordshire Regiment
- 1st Royal Warwickshire
- 1st South Wales Borderers
- 2nd Connaught Rangers
- 2nd Essex Regiment
- 2nd King's Royal Rifles
- 2nd Lancashire Fusiliers
- 2nd Royal Dublin Fusiliers
- 2nd Royal Irish Rifles
- 3rd Worcestershire
- Army Ordnance Corps (Woolwich)
- Army Service Corps (Grove Park)
- Ashford Railway Works
- Ashford Railway Works Reserves
- Ashford Town
- Ashford Town Reserves
- Ashford United
- Aveling & Porter (Strood)
- Aylesford Paper Mills
- Aylesford Paper Mills Reserves
- Belvedere & District
- Betteshanger Colliery Welfare
- Betteshanger Colliery Welfare Reserves
- Bexleyheath & Welling
- Bexleyheath & Welling Reserves
- Bexleyheath Labour
- Bexleyheath Town
- Borstal
- Bowaters Lloyd
- Bowaters Lloyd Reserves
- Bromley
- Canterbury City
- Canterbury City Reserves
- Canterbury Waverley
- Canterbury Waverley Reserves
- Carabiners
- Catford Southend
- Charlton Athletic
- Charlton Athletic 'A'
- Charlton Athletic Reserves
- Chatham
- Chatham Reserves
- Chatham Town
- Chislet Colliery Welfare
- Cray Wanderers
- Cray Wanderers Reserves
- Crystal Palace Reserves
- Dartford
- Dartford Reserves
- Dartford Amateurs
- Deal Cinque Ports
- Deal Town
- Deal Town Reserves
- Depot Battalion, RE
- Depot Machine Gun Corps (Folkestone)
- Depot Royal West Kent Regiment
- Deptford Invicta
- Deptford Town
- Dover
- Dover Reserves
- Dover United
- Erith
- Erith & Belvedere
- Erith Oil Works
- Eythorne
- Faversham Services
- Faversham Town
- Faversham Town Reserves
- Folkestone
- Folkestone Reserves
- Folkestone Gas
- Folkestone Harveians
- Folkestone Town
- Folkestone Town Reserves
- Gillingham
- Gillingham 'A'
- Gillingham Reserves
- Gravesend & Northfleet Reserves
- Gravesend Hotspur
- Gravesend United
- Grays Athletic
- Grays Thurrock United
- Grays Thurrock United Reserves
- Herne Bay
- Herne Bay Reserves
- Lloyds Paper Mills
- Lloyds Paper Mills Reserves
- London Paper Mills
- Loyal Regiment
- Luton
- Maidstone Athletic
- Maidstone Church Institute
- Maidstone Institute
- Maidstone Invicta
- Maidstone United
- Maidstone United Reserves
- Margate
- Margate Reserves
- Medway Corrugated Paper Company
- Metrogas
- Millwall Reserves
- Minster United
- Murston Rangers
- New Brompton
- New Brompton Amateurs
- New Brompton Excelsior
- Northfleet
- Northfleet United
- Orpington
- RAF Eastchurch
- Rainham
- Ramsgate
- Ramsgate Reserves
- Ramsgate Athletic
- Ramsgate Athletic Reserves
- Ramsgate Grenville
- Ramsgate Press Wanderers
- Ramsgate Town
- RETB Chatham
- Rochester
- Rochester & Borstal
- Royal Artillery
- Royal Marines (Chatham)
- Royal Marines (Chatham) Reserves
- Royal Marines (Deal)
- Royal Marines (Deal) Reserves
- Royal Naval Depot (Chatham)
- Royal Naval Depot (Chatham) Reserves
- Royal Ordnance Factories
- Royal Scots Fusiliers
- Royal West Kent Regiment
- S.E. Railway Mechanics Institute
- S.R. Athletic
- Sevenoaks
- Sheppey United
- Sheppey United Reserves
- Shorts Sports
- Sittingbourne
- Sittingbourne Reserves
- Sittingbourne Paper Mills
- Snodland Town
- Snowdown Colliery Welfare
- Snowdown Colliery Welfare Reserves
- South Lancashire Regiment
- Southend United Reserves
- Strood
- Swanscombe
- Tilbury
- Tonbridge
- Troy Town Invicta
- Tunbridge Wells United
- Tunbridge Wells United Reserves
- Vickers (Crayford)
- Vickers (Erith)
- Whitstable
- Whitstable Reserves
- Woolwich
- Woolwich Reserves
- Woolwich Arsenal Reserves
