= 2018–19 Southern Counties East Football League =

The 2018–19 Southern Counties East Football League season was the 53rd in the history of the Southern Counties East Football League, a football competition in England, and the third year the competition has two divisions, the Premier Division and Division One.

The provisional club allocations for steps 5 and 6 were announced by the FA on 25 May. These are subject to ratification by the league at its AGM on 23 June.

== Premier Division ==
Southern Counties East Football League Premier Division
- Season: 2018–19
- Champions: Cray Valley Paper Mills
- Promoted: Cray Valley Paper Mills
- Relegated: Rusthall; Croydon
- Matches: 379
- Goals: 1,307 (3.45 per match)

The Premier Division consisted of 17 clubs from the previous season along with three new clubs, promoted from Division One:

- Fisher
- K Sports
- Punjab United

=== League table ===
Pos	Team	Pld	W	D	L	GF	GA	GD	Pts	Promotion or relegation
1	Cray Valley Paper Mills	38	29	4	5	108	36	+72	91	Promoted to the Isthmian League South East Division
2	Corinthian	38	29	3	6	95	39	+56	90	
3	Fisher	38	27	4	7	77	31	+46	85	
4	Chatham Town	38	25	4	9	98	44	+54	79	
5	Beckenham Town	38	19	9	10	71	56	+15	66	
6	Erith Town	38	18	8	12	67	60	+7	62	
7	Sheppey United	38	19	3	16	77	69	+8	60	
8	Glebe	38	17	5	16	60	62	−2	56	
9	Canterbury City	38	16	7	15	64	53	+11	55 (Note: Bearstead were awarded a win, with no goals scored, in a cancelled game against Canterbury City.)	
10	Lordswood	38	16	7	15	65	65	0	55	
11	Deal Town	38	15	10	13	61	62	−1	55	
12	K Sports	38	14	7	17	58	81	−23	49	
13	Crowborough Athletic	38	14	6	18	53	81	−28	48	
14	Bearsted	38	14	5	19	57	76	−19	47	
15	AFC Croydon Athletic	38	13	6	19	55	68	−13	45	
16	Tunbridge Wells	38	11	4	23	62	80	−18	37	
17	Punjab United	38	8	11	19	55	71	−16	35	
18	Hollands & Blair	38	9	5	24	52	78	−26	32	
19	Rusthall	38	5	8	25	36	94	−58	23	Relegated to Division One
20	Croydon	38	3	2	33	36	101	−65	11	Relegated to Division One

Source: FA Full-time
Rules for classification: 1) Points; 2) Goal difference; 3) Number of goals scored; 4) Number of matches won; 5) Head-to-head results

=== Results ===
Home \ Away	ACA	BEA	BEC	CAN	CHA	COR	CVP	CRW	CRD	DEA	ERI	FIS	GLB	H&B	KSP	LOR	PUN	RUS	SHE	TUN
AFC Croydon Athletic		4–2	3–0	2–2	2–1	1–2	1–0	3–3	2–1	2–2	0–2	1–2	0–4	0–1	1–2	0–3	1–2	2–0	2–0	3–3
Bearsted	1–3		2–3	HW (Note: Match awarded, home win)	0–1	0–4	0–1	0–0	2–1	4–2	2–1	2–4	2–1	1–0	4–2	0–1	5–1	4–2	1–3	3–2
Beckenham Town	3–1	1–1		2–3	3–3	0–1	0–2	7–1	3–1	2–1	3–1	2–3	1–1	1–1	2–1	1–1	1–0	3–0	2–1	2–1
Canterbury City	2–0	1–1	3–0		1–2	2–3	0–2	2–3	5–2	1–1	0–1	0–1	1–0	3–2	1–3	4–0	1–0	5–2	3–1	1–1
Chatham Town	1–2	3–0	3–4	5–2		3–1	1–2	1–2	2–0	4–0	7–2	0–1	2–0	3–1	9–0	2–0	4–1	0–0	0–1	1–0
Corinthian	2–1	5–0	1–0	1–0	1–4		1–2	7–1	4–2	5–1	3–0	1–0	2–1	4–0	1–1	3–1	2–1	3–0	5–0	1–2
Cray Valley Paper Mills	3–0	3–0	2–2	2–0	0–1	2–3		2–1	5–0	2–3	3–1	2–0	2–1	7–1	1–1	3–0	4–4	1–0	5–0	5–1
Crowborough Athletic	3–2	3–1	2–3	1–1	1–3	1–4	0–4		1–0	2–4	1–1	1–4	3–1	2–1	2–0	2–1	0–0	1–3	3–4	1–2
Croydon	1–4	0–1	0–2	1–2	1–1	0–6	0–2	1–0		1–3	1–3	0–5	2–1	2–3	2–3	1–2	0–3	0–2	0–1	2–3
Deal Town	3–1	1–2	2–2	1–0	0–1	0–1	0–2	2–0	2–0		3–0	1–1	1–1	2–1	2–1	2–2	2–2	3–0	1–2	1–3
Erith Town	2–1	3–1	2–1	4–0	1–2	2–2	1–3	1–1	3–1	0–1		2–1	1–1	1–1	3–2	4–0	1–1	1–0	4–1	4–2
Fisher	0–0	3–2	4–0	3–1	2–1	2–0	1–2	6–0	2–1	2–0	2–2		4–0	1–0	4–1	0–1	4–1	3–0	2–1	1–0
Glebe	2–1	1–0	0–2	0–3	2–3	1–1	3–5	0–4	1–4	3–0	1–0	1–0		4–2	2–3	3–2	1–0	3–2	2–3	3–1
Hollands & Blair	1–2	3–3	2–3	1–3	0–1	0–1	3–2	0–3	2–0	2–3	0–2	1–0	2–3		1–1	0–3	4–1	3–0	0–2	0–2
K Sports	1–1	2–1	4–4	2–1	2–5	3–4	0–5	0–1	4–1	0–1	4–2	1–1	0–3	2–1		2–0	1–0	2–0	1–4	1–1
Lordswood	4–2	3–4	0–2	1–2	1–3	1–0	3–5	1–0	2–1	3–3	3–1	2–3	1–1	3–1	3–0		2–2	1–1	1–0	3–4
Punjab United	0–1	3–1	1–1	1–1	2–2	0–1	0–2	3–0	1–1	0–0	1–2	1–2	0–1	3–1	3–1	0–2		5–1	2–3	3–6
Rusthall	3–2	1–1	0–2	0–3	0–7	1–3	1–9	0–1	4–3	2–2	1–1	0–1	0–1	2–2	0–1	0–4	2–2		0–2	1–3
Sheppey United	4–0	3–1	1–0	1–1	3–2	2–4	1–3	5–0	4–0	3–1	2–3	0–1	1–3	2–4	1–2	3–3	5–1	3–3		1–2
Tunbridge Wells	0–1	1–2	0–1	0–3	3–4	1–2	1–1	1–2	5–2	2–4	1–2	0–1	1–3	0–4	3–1	0–1	2–4	1–2	1–3	

Legend: Blue = home team win; Yellow = draw; Red = away team win.

== Division One ==
Southern Counties East Football League Division One
- Season: 2018–19
- Champions: Welling Town
- Promoted: Welling Town; Erith & Belvedere
- Matches: 305
- Goals: 1,440 (4.72 per match)

Division One consisted of 14 clubs from the previous season along with four new clubs:

- Rochester United, relegated from the Premier Division
- Greenways, promoted from the Kent County League
- Kennington, promoted from the Kent County League
- Welling Town, joined from Kent County League Division Two West

=== League table ===
Pos	Team	Pld	W	D	L	GF	GA	GD	Pts	Promotion or relegation
1	Welling Town	34	24	6	4	88	41	+47	78	Promoted to the Premier Division (Note: 9 of the 19 runners-up at Step 6 were to be promoted to Step 5.)
2	Erith & Belvedere	34	24	5	5	103	46	+57	77	Promoted to the Premier Division
3	Kennington	34	22	8	4	87	41	+46	74	
4	Bridon Ropes	34	21	6	7	94	52	+42	69	
5	Sutton Athletic	34	19	7	8	81	44	+37	64	
6	Holmesdale	34	17	2	15	66	52	+14	53	
7	Forest Hill Park	34	15	7	12	59	59	0	52	
8	Stansfeld	34	14	6	14	69	63	+6	48	
9	Sporting Club Thamesmead	34	12	7	15	60	56	+4	43 (Note: Rochester United were awarded a win, with no goals scored, following a postponed game against Sporting Club Thamesmead.)	
10	Greenways	34	12	4	18	65	88	−23	40	
11	Lewisham Borough	34	12	3	19	61	78	−17	39	
12	Lydd Town	34	10	8	16	65	99	−34	38	
13	FC Elmstead	34	9	10	15	49	58	−9	37	
14	Kent Football United	34	9	9	16	67	67	0	36	
15	Snodland Town	34	9	8	17	55	81	−26	35	
16	Phoenix Sports reserves	34	8	5	21	48	86	−38	29	Resigned from the league
17	Rochester United	34	8	4	22	48	89	−41	28	
18	Meridian VP	34	7	3	24	31	96	−65	24	

Source: FA Full-time
Rules for classification: 1) Points; 2) Goal difference; 3) Number of goals scored; 4) Number of matches won; 5) Head-to-head results

=== Results ===
Home \ Away	BRI	E&B	ELM	FHP	GRE	HOL	KEN	KFU	LEW	LYD	MER	PSR	ROC	SNT	SCT	STN	SUT	WEL
Bridon Ropes		1–4	3–2	6–2	4–0	0–2	2–2	2–1	6–0	3–4	5–0	2–1	4–1	4–4	2–2	1–2	0–0	4–2
Erith & Belvedere	4–0		3–0	2–2	2–1	2–1	0–0	3–2	4–1	6–0	5–1	2–1	4–1	6–2	3–3	4–1	3–1	1–5
FC Elmstead	1–2	1–3		0–0	2–3	2–1	1–1	2–3	3–0	4–0	5–1	2–2	1–1	0–0	2–2	1–2	1–2	1–1
Forest Hill Park	2–1	0–2	4–0		1–1	2–5	2–1	2–2	0–2	3–1	2–0	2–4	6–2	0–0	3–2	2–3	1–1	0–1
Greenways	1–4	1–6	1–1	1–2		2–4	2–2	0–5	2–4	7–2	1–0	4–1	3–1	5–3	1–3	1–0	0–6	1–2
Holmesdale	4–3	0–3	0–1	0–1	2–1		3–1	2–2	0–3	4–2	4–0	2–0	0–2	2–2	2–0	2–0	2–1	0–3
Kennington	1–4	3–1	2–1	4–0	2–1	3–2		3–1	3–3	3–3	6–0	5–1	1–0	1–2	3–0	2–0	3–1	3–0
Kent Football United	1–1	1–3	1–1	2–4	3–4	1–0	1–1		2–2	1–3	5–0	3–1	7–0	2–2	1–1	2–0	0–1	0–3
Lewisham Borough	0–1	1–6	5–0	3–1	2–3	0–1	1–2	3–2		0–1	0–1	1–2	2–0	3–0	1–4	4–3	0–5	1–3
Lydd Town	0–4	2–2	3–1	1–0	1–2	1–5	0–4	2–2	2–5		4–1	3–3	4–1	2–2	3–3	2–0	0–2	1–5
Meridian VP	1–2	1–4	2–5	0–1	2–0	0–2	2–4	2–1	1–1	2–1		2–1	2–3	2–4	0–0	1–0	1–7	1–1
Phoenix Sports Reserves	4–6	4–1	0–0	1–3	1–2	0–4	0–5	0–5	1–2	6–2	2–1		0–0	0–2	1–0	1–1	0–4	0–4
Rochester United	0–2	0–1	3–1	1–2	0–5	2–4	3–5	3–1	4–2	2–3	2–4	2–3		3–2	HW (Note: Match awarded, home win)	1–3	2–2	3–6
Snodland Town	0–5	0–3	1–3	0–3	3–0	2–1	0–4	2–3	1–4	3–3	4–0	2–1	0–0		1–2	2–1	2–0	1–4
Sporting Club Thamesmead	0–2	0–4	0–1	1–2	6–2	2–1	1–2	6–1	2–1	4–1	1–0	3–1	0–3	4–3		5–2	1–2	0–1
Stansfeld	2–2	2–5	1–2	3–3	4–1	3–1	2–3	4–1	4–1	5–2	6–0	1–3	3–1	4–2	0–0		2–1	3–2
Sutton Athletic	5–1	1–1	2–0	4–1	3–3	3–2	1–2	2–1	3–2	0–2	3–0	3–1	5–1	4–1	2–1	2–2		1–1
Welling Town	0–3	3–1	3–1	2–0	4–3	2–1	0–0	2–1	5–1	4–4	4–0	5–1	1–0	2–0	2–1	0–0	4–1	

Legend: Blue = home team win; Yellow = draw; Red = away team win.
