= 2020–21 Southern Counties East Football League =

Southern Counties East League
- Season: 2020–21
- Promoted: Corinthian

The 2020–21 Southern Counties East Football League season was the 55th in the history of the Southern Counties East Football League, a football competition in England, and the fifth year the competition has had two divisions, the Premier Division and Division One, at Steps 5 and 6 respectively in the English football league system.

The allocations for Steps 5 and 6 for season 2020–21 were announced by the FA on 21 July, and were subject to appeal.

On account of the ongoing COVID-19 pandemic in England, the season was curtailed on 27 February along with all other leagues from Steps 3–6. The scheduled restructuring of non-League football took place at the end of the season, with new divisions added to the Combined Counties and the United Counties Leagues at Step 5 for 2021–22, along with an additional division in the Northern Premier League at Step 4. Promotions from Steps 5 to 4 and 6 to 5 were based on points per game across all matches over the two cancelled seasons (2019–20 and 2020–21), while teams were promoted to Step 6 on the basis of a subjective application process. As a result, three SCEL clubs were moved to the new Combined Counties Premier Division South.

== Premier Division ==
The Premier Division comprised 21 teams, two more than the number which were still playing at the time of the abandonment of the previous season's competition:

- Balham – relocated from the Combined Counties League
- Tower Hamlets – relocated from the Essex Senior League

=== Premier Division table ===
Pos	Team	Pld	W	D	L	GF	GA	GD	Pts	Promotion or qualification
1	Chatham Town	11	10	0	1	60	18	+42	30	
2	Corinthian (P)	11	10	0	1	38	16	+22	30	Promotion to the Isthmian League South East Division (Note: Promoted based on points per game calculations from 2019–20 and 2020–21 seasons combined.)
3	Tunbridge Wells	12	8	2	2	24	14	+10	26	
4	Sheppey United	9	8	1	0	28	14	+14	25	
5	Beckenham Town	13	7	3	3	33	18	+15	24	Transfer to the Combined Counties League
6	Balham	12	6	3	3	18	13	+5	21	Transfer to the Combined Counties League
7	Hollands & Blair	11	6	3	2	15	12	+3	21	
8	Erith Town	12	6	2	4	26	20	+6	20	
9	Glebe	12	5	2	5	23	22	+1	17	
10	Deal Town	11	4	4	3	14	11	+3	16	
11	Bearsted	13	5	1	7	28	39	−11	16	
12	Fisher	11	4	3	4	15	15	0	15	
13	Welling Town	11	4	1	6	18	25	−7	13	
14	Punjab United	12	4	1	7	20	29	−9	13	
15	Crowborough Athletic	11	3	3	5	14	20	−6	12	
16	Canterbury City	12	3	1	8	17	34	−17	10	
17	Erith & Belvedere	11	2	3	6	18	23	−5	9	
18	AFC Croydon Athletic	12	2	3	7	14	27	−13	9	Transfer to the Combined Counties League
19	Lordswood	13	2	2	9	13	29	−16	8	
20	K Sports	11	1	4	6	10	18	−8	7	
21	Tower Hamlets	13	0	2	11	17	46	−29	2	

Source: FA Full-Time
Rules for classification: 1) Points; 2) Goal difference; 3) Number of goals scored; 4) Number of matches won; 5) Head-to-head results
(P) Promoted

=== Results table ===
Home \ Away	ACA	BAL	BEA	BEC	CAN	CHA	COR	CRW	DEA	ERB	ERT	FIS	GLB	H&B	KSP	LOR	PUN	SHE	TOW	TUN	WEL
AFC Croydon Athletic	—		2–1	0–0	3–0		2–4			1–1		2–3				0–2					
Balham		—	5–2						0–0		2–1		2–1	2–1							1–2
Bearsted			—			2–5					2–2		2–5					2–5	2–1		
Beckenham Town			3–4	—		1–5					3–1	2–1	2–2			3–0				3–0	
Canterbury City					—	2–7	0–2						0–2	1–2	2–1		3–2				1–2
Chatham Town	8–3					—								6–0			5–0		6–1	2–3	
Corinthian			4–2				—		2–1			4–2				2–1		3–4	6–2		
Crowborough Athletic								—													
Deal Town				0–2					—					0–0		2–0	5–2	1–3	2–1		
Erith & Belvedere		1–2		2–2	3–0	3–4	1–5			—							1–2				
Erith Town	2–0					3–6					—	0–0						2–4	5–0	4–0	
Fisher		0–1							0–0	2–0		—	3–2						3–1	1–3	
Glebe							1–2		1–1				—		0–4	3–2			2–0		3–2
Hollands & Blair										0–0				—	2–1					0–0	2–0
K Sports	1–1								0–2		0–1				—	1–1		1–1		2–1	
Lordswood		0–0	2–4		1–2					4–3						—				0–5	0–3
Punjab United	4–0	2–1		0–7										1–3	5–0		—			1–2	
Sheppey United		3–2		3–2	4–1											1–0		—			2–0
Tower Hamlets				0–3	5–5									1–3			1–1		—		2–3
Tunbridge Wells	1–0		4–0										2–1		2–0					—	2–2
Welling Town			1–4				0–4				1–2										—

Source: FA Full-Time Grid
Legend: Blue = home team win; Yellow = draw; Red = away team win.
For upcoming matches, an "a" indicates there is an article about the rivalry between the two participants.

== Division One ==
Division One comprised the same 17 teams which were still competing when the previous season's competition was aborted.

=== Division One table ===
Pos	Team	Pld	W	D	L	GF	GA	GD	Pts	Promotion
1	Sporting Club Thamesmead	8	7	0	1	24	10	+14	21	
2	Kennington (P)	6	6	0	0	27	3	+24	18	Promotion to the Premier Division (Note: Promoted based on points per game calculations from 2019–20 and 2020–21 seasons combined.)
3	Rochester United	7	5	2	0	16	6	+10	17	
4	Holmesdale (P)	6	5	0	1	20	9	+11	15	Promotion to the Premier Division
5	Rusthall (P)	8	5	0	3	21	14	+7	15	Promotion to the Premier Division
6	Greenways	7	4	0	3	13	12	+1	12	
7	Croydon	7	3	2	2	17	19	−2	11	
8	Snodland Town	7	3	1	3	9	16	−7	10	
9	Kent Football United	8	2	2	4	8	14	−6	8	
10	Stansfeld	6	2	1	3	18	18	0	7	
11	Lydd Town	5	2	1	2	14	15	−1	7	
12	Forest Hill Park	7	2	1	4	9	13	−4	7	
13	Sutton Athletic	7	2	1	4	11	19	−8	7	
14	Lewisham Borough	7	1	3	3	6	9	−3	6	
15	FC Elmstead	8	1	1	6	10	23	−13	4	
16	Bridon Ropes	7	0	2	5	5	16	−11	2	
17	Meridian VP	7	0	1	6	6	18	−12	1	

Source: FA Full-time
Rules for classification: 1) Points; 2) Goal difference; 3) Number of goals scored; 4) Number of matches won; 5) Head-to-head results
(P) Promoted
