= 2017–18 Southern Counties East Football League =

The 2017–18 Southern Counties East Football League season was the 52nd in the history of the Southern Counties East Football League, a football competition in England, and was the second year the competition has two divisions, the Premier Division and Division One.

The constitution for Step 5 and Step 6 divisions for 2017–18 was announced on 26 May 2017.

== Premier Division ==
Southern Counties East Football League Premier Division
- Season: 2017–18
- Champions: Sevenoaks Town
- Promoted: Sevenoaks Town; Whitstable Town
- Relegated: Rochester United
- Matches: 379
- Goals: 1,238 (3.27 per match)

The Premier Division consisted of 17 clubs from the previous season along with three new clubs:

- Chatham Town, relegated from the Isthmian League
- Glebe, promoted from Division One
- Rusthall, promoted from Division One

=== League table ===
Pos	Team	Pld	W	D	L	GF	GA	GD	Pts	Promotion or relegation
1	Sevenoaks Town	38	27	7	4	93	33	+60	88	Promoted to the Isthmian League South East Division (Note: 12 of the 14 runners-up at Step 5 were to be promoted to Step 4. However, with resignations and mergers in Step 4 leagues, all 14 runners-up will be promoted.)
2	Whitstable Town	38	25	7	6	74	30	+44	82	Promoted to the Isthmian League South East Division
3	Crowborough Athletic	38	22	6	10	79	43	+36	72	
4	Beckenham Town	38	22	3	13	84	61	+23	69	
5	Croydon	38	20	5	13	77	60	+17	65	
6	Cray Valley Paper Mills	38	19	6	13	69	58	+11	63	
7	Deal Town	38	18	6	14	67	61	+6	60	
8	Lordswood	38	16	11	11	60	57	+3	59	
9	Corinthian	38	17	5	16	59	54	+5	56	
10	Canterbury City	38	14	12	12	63	55	+8	54	
11	Sheppey United	38	14	9	15	73	62	+11	51	
12	Glebe	38	15	6	17	58	71	−13	51	
13	AFC Croydon Athletic	38	14	8	16	52	68	−16	50	
14	Bearsted	38	14	4	20	48	58	−10	46	
15	Tunbridge Wells	38	12	10	16	49	65	−16	46	
16	Chatham Town	38	11	10	17	44	56	−12	43	
17	Erith Town	38	11	6	21	47	69	−22	39	
18	Hollands & Blair	38	9	4	25	51	82	−31	31	
19	Rusthall	38	7	8	23	46	87	−41	29	
20	Rochester United	38	3	7	28	45	108	−63	16 (Note: Rochester United failed to fulfil the fixture against Beckenham Town in January 2018. Beckenham were awarded the win with no further punishment.)	Relegated to Division One

Source: SCEFL Premier Division
Rules for classification: 1) Points; 2) Goal difference; 3) Number of goals scored; 4) Number of matches won; 5) Head-to-head results

=== Results ===
Home \ Away	ACA	BEA	BEC	CAN	CHA	COR	CVP	CRW	CRD	DEA	ERI	GLB	H&B	LOR	ROC	RUS	SEV	SHE	TUN	WHT
AFC Croydon Athletic		2–1	1–2	1–1	0–2	3–1	2–1	0–2	0–2	2–0	1–1	2–2	0–0	2–3	2–2	1–1	0–2	4–2	3–2	2–4
Bearsted	0–0		2–0	2–2	2–2	0–2	1–3	1–0	2–3	0–1	3–0	3–1	2–1	0–1	1–0	2–0	0–5	0–2	1–0	1–2
Beckenham Town	1–2	3–2		2–1	4–2	2–0	3–2	2–3	0–1	6–1	0–3	6–0	2–1	1–3	4–2	3–1	2–3	1–2	2–3	3–1
Canterbury City	5–0	0–1	2–3		1–0	1–0	2–5	0–1	2–2	1–3	3–1	1–2	2–1	1–0	4–2	1–0	0–0	2–2	5–1	2–2
Chatham Town	0–2	1–0	1–4	2–0		1–2	0–0	1–3	1–1	1–3	1–0	1–2	2–1	0–0	0–0	0–0	0–3	1–1	1–0	1–3
Corinthian	3–4	1–0	2–1	0–0	1–0		1–1	0–2	2–0	0–1	2–1	3–1	0–0	1–2	2–3	5–0	1–2	3–0	1–3	0–5
Cray Valley Paper Mills	1–0	1–0	1–2	3–3	2–1	0–0		1–4	2–3	3–2	2–4	3–0	2–1	3–1	1–1	0–2	2–1	2–3	1–2	2–1
Crowborough Athletic	1–0	3–0	2–2	2–1	2–2	2–3	1–2		2–3	2–1	2–1	2–2	3–0	1–1	6–1	4–2	1–2	1–2	2–1	0–1
Croydon	1–3	3–0	2–0	1–3	0–4	1–4	3–1	2–2		3–2	2–0	0–1	6–2	3–0	2–0	2–1	1–2	2–2	2–3	0–2
Deal Town	3–0	1–1	2–0	1–4	2–0	0–0	1–0	0–3	3–1		2–1	4–1	4–1	1–3	6–3	4–2	1–2	0–0	1–1	2–1
Erith Town	0–1	4–3	0–4	0–1	2–1	1–5	2–3	0–2	0–2	0–0		1–2	2–1	0–3	0–1	2–0	1–2	0–2	1–0	1–1
Glebe	3–1	3–1	1–3	3–0	0–2	2–3	1–2	0–1	0–1	2–1	2–4		1–0	1–3	3–2	2–2	0–0	2–0	0–0	1–3
Hollands & Blair	1–2	2–4	2–3	1–1	0–3	2–1	1–5	1–1	1–4	1–2	4–1	2–1		4–3	3–2	3–0	1–3	1–3	3–0	1–2
Lordswood	3–1	2–1	1–1	0–2	2–1	1–0	2–1	0–4	3–3	1–0	1–1	0–2	3–1		3–1	2–3	1–1	1–0	1–2	1–2
Rochester United	1–3	1–3	AW (Note: Match awarded, away win)	0–2	2–2	3–4	1–2	2–4	0–5	1–4	2–4	2–5	1–0	2–2		1–2	0–6	2–2	1–3	0–4
Rusthall	2–2	1–2	1–3	2–2	1–4	2–3	1–2	3–2	2–7	0–2	1–1	0–2	2–3	2–2	3–2		0–3	2–1	0–0	0–3
Sevenoaks Town	7–0	1–0	4–2	2–2	2–0	2–0	2–2	1–0	3–0	4–0	1–2	1–1	4–1	3–0	3–0	3–1		2–5	6–2	2–1
Sheppey United	1–3	0–2	2–4	3–1	7–1	3–0	2–1	0–2	2–3	3–3	3–1	6–2	1–2	3–3	4–0	1–2	1–2		1–2	0–0
Tunbridge Wells	1–0	1–4	1–2	2–2	1–1	1–3	0–2	1–4	1–0	4–3	1–2	1–2	2–1	1–1	1–1	3–2	0–0	1–1		0–1
Whitstable Town	3–0	3–0	1–1	2–0	0–1	1–0	1–2	1–0	2–0	3–0	2–2	4–2	2–0	1–1	3–0	2–0	2–1	1–0	1–1	

Legend: Blue = home team win; Yellow = draw; Red = away team win.

=== Top scorers ===
Rank	Player	Club	Goals
1	Richard Atkins	Beckenham Town	31
2	Dan Bradshaw	Sheppey United	23
3	Kevin Lisbie	Cray Valley (PM)	22
4	Lauris Chin	Croydon	20
5	Danny Williams	Whitstable Town	18
5	James McDonald	Hollands & Blair	18
5	Kenny Pogue	Sevenoaks Town	18
8	Sam Wilson	Deal Town	17

== Division One ==
Southern Counties East Football League Division One
- Season: 2017–18
- Champions: Punjab United
- Promoted: Punjab United; K Sports; Fisher
- Relegated: Crockenhill
- Matches: 342
- Goals: 1,440 (4.21 per match)

Division One consisted of 16 clubs from the previous season along with three new clubs:

- Erith & Belvedere, relegated from the Premier Division
- Fisher, relegated from the Premier Division
- Punjab United, promoted from the Kent County League

Also, Eltham Palace changed their name to Stansfeld.

=== League table ===
Pos	Team	Pld	W	D	L	GF	GA	GD	Pts	Promotion or relegation
1	Punjab United	36	28	6	2	96	36	+60	90	Promoted to the Premier Division
2	K Sports	36	29	4	3	106	32	+74	88 (Note: K Sports were deducted three points for fielding a suspended player on 20 March.)	Promoted to the Premier Division
3	Fisher	36	24	4	8	96	39	+57	76	Promoted to the Premier Division
4	Erith & Belvedere	36	19	6	11	86	61	+25	63	
5	Bridon Ropes	36	19	4	13	93	69	+24	61	
6	Snodland Town	36	18	4	14	84	72	+12	58	
7	Kent Football United	36	21	5	10	108	73	+35	56 (Note: Kent Football United were deducted three points for fielding an ineligible player on 12 August, and a further nine points for similar offences on 7 October and 25 November. They were initially demoted for ground grading failure after the season but have appealed the decision.)	
8	Holmesdale	36	17	5	14	84	55	+29	56	
9	FC Elmstead	36	16	7	13	65	58	+7	55	
10	Lydd Town	36	17	2	17	88	77	+11	53	
11	Sutton Athletic	36	14	6	16	69	68	+1	48	
12	Sporting Club Thamesmead	36	14	3	19	73	75	−2	45	
13	Stansfeld	36	13	6	17	80	88	−8	45	
14	Phoenix Sports Reserves	36	13	5	18	59	61	−2	44	
15	Meridian VP	36	11	6	19	67	82	−15	39	
16	Forest Hill Park	36	9	6	21	56	96	−40	33	
17	Gravesham Borough	36	10	5	21	59	94	−35	32 (Note: Gravesham Borough were deducted three points for fielding suspended players between 3 October and 11 November.)	Club folded before the next season
18	Lewisham Borough	36	4	2	30	42	131	−89	14	
19	Crockenhill	36	3	0	33	29	173	−144	9	Relegated to the Kent County League

Source: SCEFL Division One
Rules for classification: 1) Points; 2) Goal difference; 3) Number of goals scored; 4) Number of matches won; 5) Head-to-head results

=== Results ===
Home \ Away	BRI	CRO	E&B	ELM	FIS	FHP	GRB	HOL	KSP	KFU	LEW	LYD	MER	PSR	PUN	SNT	SCT	STN	SUT
Bridon Ropes		1–2	5–2	2–1	2–3	2–0	4–4	1–1	0–1	0–4	5–1	2–1	3–0	2–2	0–3	5–3	3–1	5–1	4–0
Crockenhill	3–1		0–2	3–4	1–5	2–6	0–4	1–12	0–8	1–2	3–1	2–6	2–5	0–4	1–2	0–5	0–4	0–7	0–6
Erith & Belvedere	1–6	7–1		4–1	0–0	4–1	3–3	4–3	2–1	3–2	8–1	1–3	4–2	3–1	4–2	2–3	1–2	1–1	3–0
FC Elmstead	1–1	4–1	0–0		2–3	0–0	3–0	2–4	1–3	1–2	4–4	1–0	3–2	1–0	1–3	1–3	2–0	2–2	5–2
Fisher	2–4	6–0	2–0	2–0		1–3	2–1	3–3	2–2	0–3	4–1	9–1	3–0	3–0	1–2	3–0	6–1	2–1	3–0
Forest Hill Park	2–5	3–0	1–1	2–0	0–3		1–2	2–3	1–5	4–4	3–0	1–9	3–1	0–3	1–2	1–4	0–3	0–5	3–1
Gravesham Borough	3–4	3–0	0–6	2–3	0–6	2–1		0–3	0–2	5–1	4–3	1–2	0–2	0–3	1–7	1–3	1–1	1–3	3–1
Holmesdale	4–2	3–0	0–1	0–1	1–0	1–2	1–0		4–2	2–2	4–2	2–3	3–1	2–1	1–1	1–3	5–1	2–0	1–2
K Sports	3–1	9–0	3–0	1–0	2–0	2–0	4–0	1–0		3–3	7–0	2–1	3–1	6–3	1–0	2–0	2–4	4–2	2–1
Kent Football United	3–2	9–1	1–3	0–2	2–0	5–2	5–1	2–1	2–4		4–1	4–0	3–3	4–2	2–6	4–3	3–3	0–2	1–2
Lewisham Borough	1–4	4–0	2–4	0–2	0–4	1–1	0–4	1–8	1–3	0–3		1–4	2–3	0–3	0–5	0–2	1–4	4–5	0–5
Lydd Town	1–2	8–1	3–0	0–1	1–3	5–0	3–2	3–0	1–3	3–2	2–3		3–2	0–1	1–1	2–2	3–2	4–2	1–3
Meridian VP	1–2	2–0	2–2	2–3	1–3	1–1	0–1	1–1	0–3	2–3	4–3	4–2		1–0	2–4	2–2	5–3	5–1	1–2
Phoenix Sports Reserves	1–4	6–0	0–2	1–5	1–1	0–2	3–0	0–3	0–3	1–5	7–0	2–1	1–1		0–1	2–1	2–2	1–1	2–0
Punjab United	2–1	5–0	3–1	2–2	1–0	5–2	5–1	1–0	0–0	4–2	3–0	4–3	2–1	2–0		2–0	2–1	5–1	3–2
Snodland Town	0–2	6–0	0–1	2–1	1–3	3–2	3–6	3–2	1–4	2–3	2–0	0–1	3–1	3–2	1–1		2–0	1–4	5–3
Sporting Club Thamesmead	5–3	3–1	1–3	1–0	0–2	4–1	3–0	0–1	0–2	1–4	0–2	3–1	6–0	3–0	0–2	2–5		5–1	2–1
Stansfeld	4–2	5–2	2–1	3–4	1–3	4–4	2–2	3–2	0–2	3–6	1–0	5–2	0–3	1–2	0–1	3–4	3–2		1–1
Sutton Athletic	2–1	4–1	3–1	1–1	1–3	3–0	1–1	3–0	1–1	0–3	1–2	3–4	2–3	1–0	2–2	3–3	3–2	3–0	

Legend: Blue = home team win; Yellow = draw; Red = away team win.

=== Top scorers ===
Rank	Player	Club	Goals
1	Tunde Aderonmu	Kent Football United	41
2	Joshua Patrick	Sporting Club Thamesmead	38
3	Caine Smith	K Sports	30
4	Gary Lockyer	Lydd Town	29
4	Andrew Constable	Holmesdale	29
6	Billy Shinners	Stansfeld	25
7	David Sherwood	Snodland Town	24
