= 2012–13 Kent Invicta Football League =

Football league season

The 2012–13 Kent Invicta Football League season was the second in the history of the Kent Invicta Football League, a football competition in England for clubs located in and adjacent to the historic county of Kent.

The league comprised one division and there was also a league cup competition, the Challenge Trophy.

== The League ==
Kent Invicta Football League
- Season: 2012–13
- Champions: Phoenix Sports
- Promoted: Phoenix Sports; Ashford United
- Matches: 234
- Goals: 899 (3.84 per match)

The league featured seventeen clubs of which fifteen had competed in the league the previous season together with two additional clubs:

- Crown Alexandra, joined from the South London Alliance
- Eltham Palace, joined from the Kent County League

Also, Erith & Dartford Town changed their name to Kent Football United.

Newly joined club Crown Alexandra resigned from the league in December 2012 and their record was expunged.

Phoenix Sports won the league and were promoted to the Southern Counties East League (SCEFL). This season owing to a planned expansion of the SCEFL there were two promotion places available: second placed Hollands & Blair did not meet ground grading requirements so third placed Ashford United took the promotion. Also leaving the division were Woodstock Park who resigned to the Kent County League.

=== League table ===
Pos	Team	Pld	W	D	L	GF	GA	GD	Pts	Promotion or relegation
1	Phoenix Sports	30	25	3	2	108	26	+82	78	Promoted to the Southern Counties East League
2	Hollands & Blair	30	24	2	4	96	25	+71	74 (Note: Record includes awarded match wins (without goals), (see Results schedule below).)	
3	Ashford United	30	20	6	4	79	32	+47	66	Promoted to the Southern Counties East League
4	Bearsted	30	18	3	9	82	43	+39	57	
5	Seven Acre & Sidcup	30	15	5	10	59	46	+13	50	
6	Lydd Town	30	15	5	10	63	59	+4	50	
7	Bridon Ropes	30	14	6	10	51	35	+16	48	
8	Sutton Athletic	30	12	5	13	41	41	0	41 (Note: Record includes awarded match losses (without goals), (see Results schedule below).)	
9	Orpington	30	12	4	14	35	64	−29	40	
10	Eltham Palace	29	10	6	13	49	74	−25	36 (Note: Kent Football United versus Eltham Palace match abandoned and not re-played.)	
11	Kent Football United	29	8	5	16	43	67	−24	29 (Note: Kent Football United versus Eltham Palace match abandoned and not re-played. Record includes awarded match wins (without goals), (see Results schedule below). .)	
12	Rusthall	30	8	5	17	38	81	−43	29	
13	Crockenhill	30	7	4	19	44	84	−40	25	
14	Woodstock Park	30	6	4	20	33	58	−25	22	Resigned to the Kent County League
15	Meridian S & S	30	6	3	21	40	80	−40	21	
16	Lewisham Borough	30	5	2	23	38	84	−46	17	
17	Crown Alexandra	0	0	0	0	0	0	0	0 (Note: Crown Alexandra resigned from the league on 12 December 2012, and their record (PL13 W2 D3 L8 GF14 GA44 Pts9) was subsequently expunged.)	Resigned, record expunged

Source: League Official (archived), FA Full-Time
Rules for classification: 1) points; 2) goal difference; 3) number of goals scored.

=== Results ===
Home \ Away	ASH	BEA	BRI	CRO	ELT	H&B	KFU	LEW	LYD	MER	ORP	PHO	RUS	SEV	SUT	WOO
Ashford United		2–0	0–0	4–0	2–0	1–3	3–2	5–0	7–2	3–0	5–0	1–2	4–4	5–2	2–1	5–1
Bearsted	3–1		4–1	2–0	5–0	1–2	1–2	3–1	1–2	7–0	7–0	4–4	4–1	2–0	2–1	2–1
Bridon Ropes	1–1	3–5		4–0	7–0	2–0	3–0	1–1	2–2	0–2	1–0	3–2	2–1	0–1	1–0	4–1
Crockenhill	0–2	2–5	1–4		3–3	1–3	AW (Note: AW: Match awarded, away win)	4–3	0–4	1–1	0–2	1–2	1–3	3–6	1–1	2–1
Eltham Palace	2–2	2–2	0–1	3–2		0–4	4–3	1–0	0–1	4–3	2–2	1–3	3–2	0–3	3–2	0–2
Hollands & Blair	0–2	2–1	3–0	8–0	8–1		3–0	5–0	2–2	2–1	6–2	2–3	0–0	2–0	3–2	HW (Note: HW: Match awarded, home win)
Kent Football United	1–1	1–1	0–2	4–1	Ab (Note: Ab: Match abandoned, not re-played)	0–3		2–0	1–2	5–0	0–2	0–6	1–2	0–4	0–3	3–2
Lewisham Borough	2–6	0–3	0–1	2–5	0–4	1–5	4–2		0–4	2–1	0–1	2–4	2–3	1–2	0–1	5–1
Lydd Town	1–3	0–5	0–0	1–4	2–3	2–4	3–3	3–2		8–1	2–1	1–0	6–1	1–2	2–5	1–1
Meridian S & S	1–3	1–4	0–3	7–1	1–1	0–5	2–2	2–3	0–2		1–2	0–4	1–4	1–3	2–3	2–0
Orpington	0–5	4–2	2–1	1–1	1–5	0–4	0–1	2–0	0–2	2–1		0–6	2–1	3–3	0–1	HW
Phoenix Sports	3–0	4–1	3–2	4–0	3–1	1–0	3–1	7–1	5–0	2–0	2–0		12–0	6–1	2–2	2–1
Rusthall	1–2	0–2	0–0	1–4	0–2	0–7	2–3	2–1	4–2	1–4	3–4	0–6		1–1	HW	HW
Seven Acre & Sidcup	0–1	3–1	2–0	0–2	3–0	0–2	6–3	1–3	1–2	1–2	1–0	0–0	1–1		5–1	1–1
Sutton Athletic	0–0	0–2	2–1	2–0	5–2	0–3	1–1	2–1	0–1	1–0	0–0	1–3	2–0	1–3		1–0
Woodstock Park	0–1	3–0	2–1	1–4	2–2	2–5	3–2	1–1	1–2	1–3	1–2	0–4	2–0	1–3	1–0	

Source: FA Full-Time, League Official (archived) (adjusted by 17/11/12 Bridon Ropes 0-1 Seven Acre & Sidcup)
Legend: Blue = home team win; Yellow = draw; Red = away team win.

== Challenge Trophy ==
The 2012–13 Kent Invicta League Challenge Trophy, sponsored by Sandom Robinson, was won by Hollands & Blair.

The competition was contested by all 17 teams from the league over four single tie rounds to reach the final, played on a neutral ground (at Ashford United this season).

=== Preliminary round ===
Two clubs competed in one preliminary round tie; there were byes for the remaining fifteen clubs.

Home team	Score	Away team
Ashford United	4 – 0	Crown Alexandra

=== First round ===
Sixteen clubs competed in eight first round ties.

Home team	Score	Away team
Woodstock Park	5 – 1	Kent Football United
Bearsted	3 – 1	Seven Acre & Sidcup
Lewisham Borough	3 – 2	Ashford United
Lydd Town	3 – 0	Crockenhill
Phoenix Sports	5 – 0	Eltham Palace
Sutton Athletic	3 – 2	Orpington
Hollands & Blair	2 – 0	Meridian S & S
Bridon Ropes	2 – 0	Rusthall

=== Quarter-finals, Semi-finals and Final ===
Quarter-finals
Woodstock Park	0
Bearsted	6
Lewisham Borough	0
Lydd Town	4
Phoenix Sports	4
Sutton Athletic	1
Hollands & Blair	7
Bridon Ropes	2

Semi-finals
Bearsted	0
Lydd Town	3
Phoenix Sports	1
Hollands & Blair	2

Final
Lydd Town	3
Hollands & Blair	4

Sources: "Kent Invicta Challenge Trophy, Sponsored by Sandom Robinson, 2012 - 13". Kent Invicta Football League. Archived from the original on 3 July 2013.; "2012–13 Kent Invicta League: Challenge Trophy (Sandom Robinson)". Football Club History Database.; "Hollands & Blair 4-3 Lydd Town - We weren't at our best today, admits Blair boss Paul Piggott". kentishfootball.co.uk. 1 April 2013.
