= 2015–16 Kent Invicta Football League =

Football league season

The 2015–16 Kent Invicta Football League season, known for sponsorship reasons as the Pain & Glory Sports Kent Invicta League, was the fifth and last in the history of Kent Invicta Football League, a football competition in England for clubs located in and adjacent to the historic county of Kent. At the end of the season, the league merged with the Southern Counties East League and became the lower division of the merged league.

The league comprised one division and there was also a league cup competition, the Challenge Trophy.

== The League ==
Kent Invicta Football League
- Season: 2015–16
- Champions: Bearsted
- Promoted: Bearsted; Sheppey United
- Matches: 380
- Goals: 1,443 (3.8 per match)

The league comprised twenty clubs of which fifteen competed in the league the previous season, together with five additional clubs:

- AC London, elected into the Football Pyramid for the first time
- APM Contrast, promoted from the Kent County League Premier Division
- F.C. Elmstead, elected from Kent County League Division Two West
- Forest Hill Park, elected from Kent County League Division One West
- Phoenix Sports reserves, elected from Kent County League Division One West

Bearsted were league champions and took promotion, along with runners-up Sheppey United, to the Southern Counties East League Premier Division (their post-merger top division). After the season AC London moved to the Combined Counties League and the rest of the clubs formed the bulk of the SCEFL Division One for the following season.

=== League table ===
Pos	Team	Pld	W	D	L	GF	GA	GD	Pts	Promotion or qualification
1	Bearsted	38	29	4	5	91	33	+58	91	Promoted to SCEFL Premier Division
2	Sheppey United	38	27	6	5	107	36	+71	87	Promoted to SCEFL Premier Division
3	Glebe	38	26	4	8	107	45	+62	82	Qualified for SCEFL Division One
4	Sutton Athletic	38	25	4	9	114	53	+61	79	Qualified for SCEFL Division One
5	Bridon Ropes	38	21	7	10	73	49	+24	70	Qualified for SCEFL Division One
6	APM Contrast	38	20	9	9	86	44	+42	69	Qualified for SCEFL Division One
7	Gravesham Borough	38	21	5	12	118	66	+52	68	Qualified for SCEFL Division One
8	Lydd Town	38	21	5	12	90	48	+42	68	Qualified for SCEFL Division One
9	Seven Acre & Sidcup	38	20	5	13	91	72	+19	65	Qualified for SCEFL Division One
10	AC London	38	15	12	11	77	59	+18	51 (Note: AC London were deducted six points for a breach of league rules.)	Transferred to the Combined Counties League
11	FC Elmstead	38	14	8	16	73	74	−1	50	Qualified for SCEFL Division One
12	Meridian VP	38	14	7	17	71	92	−21	49	Qualified for SCEFL Division One
13	Forest Hill Park	38	13	7	18	46	69	−23	46	Qualified for SCEFL Division One
14	Phoenix Sports Reserves	38	12	5	21	46	80	−34	41	Qualified for SCEFL Division One
15	Crockenhill	38	11	7	20	57	90	−33	40	Qualified for SCEFL Division One
16	Orpington	38	10	6	22	44	68	−24	36	Qualified for SCEFL Division One
17	Kent Football United	38	6	6	26	47	119	−72	24	Qualified for SCEFL Division One
18	Eltham Palace	38	6	3	29	36	132	−96	21	Qualified for SCEFL Division One
19	Rusthall	38	4	8	26	40	97	−57	20	Qualified for SCEFL Division One
20	Lewisham Borough	38	2	8	28	29	117	−88	14	Qualified for SCEFL Division One

Source: fchd
Rules for classification: 1) points; 2) goal difference; 3) number of goals scored.

=== Results ===
Home \ Away	APM	BEA	BRI	CRO	ELM	ELT	FHP	GLB	GRA	KFU	LEW	LON	LYD	MER	ORP	PHO	RUS	SEV	SHP	SUT
APM Contrast		2–3	2–1	5–0	1–1	2–0	4–1	1–2	3–1	5–1	6–0	1–1	1–0	0–0	4–0	3–0	2–0	0–2	1–1	1–0
Bearsted	0–2		2–1	8–1	4–2	7–0	2–0	0–2	3–1	6–0	3–1	1–0	1–0	4–3	2–0	3–0	2–0	4–0	0–0	4–3
Bridon Ropes	1–1	3–0		1–1	5–2	5–0	2–1	0–0	5–1	1–0	1–0	2–1	1–2	1–2	2–1	3–1	2–0	0–1	2–0	1–3
Crockenhill	0–4	1–2	1–2		3–2	4–0	5–3	1–3	2–0	2–0	3–1	1–1	1–4	1–2	0–2	4–1	0–0	1–2	1–2	0–4
FC Elmstead	0–3	0–2	1–3	2–1		6–1	4–0	1–1	3–3	1–0	2–1	0–0	1–3	4–2	2–2	1–4	1–1	1–3	1–5	5–0
Eltham Palace	1–5	0–1	2–3	0–2	1–3		1–2	2–11	3–2	3–3	3–0	1–3	1–1	1–3	2–1	0–1	1–0	2–3	0–4	0–6
Forest Hill Park	0–0	0–2	0–2	3–2	2–1	1–1		2–3	1–1	3–2	2–0	1–1	1–0	4–2	0–1	2–1	1–0	1–0	0–4	1–2
Glebe	1–2	1–3	1–1	1–2	4–0	7–0	3–1		3–0	3–2	9–1	1–3	2–1	5–3	1–0	1–2	3–0	2–3	2–2	2–0
Gravesham Borough	2–2	4–1	0–3	2–0	1–3	13–0	1–0	4–1		2–2	5–1	5–1	1–6	5–1	6–0	7–2	3–0	4–3	1–3	5–1
Kent Football United	1–0	0–0	0–6	4–4	0–8	3–2	1–3	0–3	1–2		1–1	0–2	3–2	2–3	3–1	3–1	0–3	3–7	0–2	0–6
Lewisham Borough	1–3	0–5	1–2	1–3	1–0	6–1	1–1	0–6	1–9	0–2		1–1	0–5	0–1	1–1	0–1	1–1	0–1	0–2	1–1
AC London	2–1	0–3	4–1	1–1	1–3	4–1	2–0	1–2	1–4	6–4	3–0		2–2	1–1	1–0	2–1	7–1	1–1	1–1	3–3
Lydd Town	3–2	4–0	1–2	4–0	0–0	3–0	4–1	0–1	3–1	8–1	3–1	3–2		3–1	1–0	3–0	3–3	2–2	1–2	2–3
Meridian VP	3–3	0–2	1–1	2–0	3–4	3–0	2–2	0–4	1–1	3–1	2–2	1–7	1–2		3–0	2–0	4–1	2–1	1–4	1–3
Orpington	3–3	0–0	1–3	0–1	1–3	4–0	2–3	0–1	2–3	2–0	2–1	0–3	0–5	2–0		2–0	5–1	0–2	1–1	2–3
Phoenix Sports Reserves	0–2	0–0	3–3	1–1	2–1	1–0	0–1	1–2	0–6	3–1	2–2	0–2	2–1	2–1	1–2		3–1	3–2	2–3	1–1
Rusthall	3–4	0–1	1–1	4–4	1–2	1–2	2–1	0–3	0–5	1–1	4–1	2–2	1–2	2–5	0–1	1–2		1–0	0–4	1–6
Seven Acre & Sidcup	4–2	2–6	3–0	7–1	0–0	4–2	0–0	1–5	1–3	6–1	5–0	5–4	3–1	2–4	2–2	2–1	4–2		1–2	4–1
Sheppey United	2–1	0–2	2–0	5–1	5–1	4–1	2–1	3–1	1–4	6–0	7–0	3–0	1–2	8–0	3–1	3–1	2–0	5–1		3–4
Sutton Athletic	3–2	0–2	6–0	4–1	4–1	0–1	6–0	2–4	2–0	2–1	8–0	1–0	3–0	7–2	1–0	6–0	6–1	3–1	0–0	

Source: FA Full-Time
Legend: Blue = home team win; Yellow = draw; Red = away team win.

== Challenge Trophy ==
The 2015–16 Kent Invicta League Challenge Trophy, sponsored by Pain & Glory Sports, was won by Glebe.

The competition was contested by all twenty teams from the league over four single tie rounds to reach the final, played on a neutral ground (at Sheppey United this season).

=== First round ===
Eight clubs competed in four first round ties with the remaining clubs receiving byes.

Home team	Score	Away team
Seven Acre & Sidcup	4 – 1	Lewisham Borough
Rusthall	2 – 5	Lydd Town
Bearsted	4 – 2	Kent Football United
Meridian VP	1 – 4	Sutton Athletic

=== Second round ===
Sixteen clubs competed in eight second round ties.

Home team	Score	Away team
Orpington	1 – 0	Phoenix Sports Reserves
Crockenhill	1 – 4	Glebe
APM Contrast	1 – 0	Seven Acre & Sidcup
AC London	4 – 2	Lydd Town
Bridon Ropes	3 – 1	FC Elmstead
Gravesham Borough	1 – 0	Sheppey United
Eltham Palace	1 – 4	Bearsted
Forest Hill Park	2 – 3	Sutton Athletic

=== Quarter-finals, Semi-finals and Final ===
Quarter-finals
Orpington	0
Glebe	7
APM Contrast	1
AC London	0
Bridon Ropes	2
Gravesham Borough	1
Bearsted	0
Sutton Athletic	1

Semi-finals
Glebe	3
APM Contrast	1
Bridon Ropes	A (Note: Match abandoned (floodlight failure) after 105 minutes with score 1–1)	2
Sutton Athletic	A	3

Final
Glebe	2 (Note: After extra time (1–1 after 90 minutes))
Sutton Athletic	1

Sources: "Kent Invicta League Challenge Trophy". Kent Invicta Football League. Archived from the original on 12 May 2016.; "2015–16 Kent Invicta League: Challenge Trophy (Pain and Glory Sports)". Football Club History Database.; "Results: April 2016: Saturday 7 May 2016: Kent Invicta League Challenge Trophy Final". Kentish Football.
