= 2016–17 Southern Counties East Football League =

The 2016–17 Southern Counties East Football League season was the 51st in the history of the Southern Counties East Football League, a football competition in England, and is the first year the competition has two divisions, having merged with the Kent Invicta Football League.

== Premier Division ==
Southern Counties East Football League Premier Division
- Season: 2016–17
- Champions: Ashford United
- Promoted: Ashford United
- Relegated: Fisher; Erith & Belvedere
- Matches: 380
- Goals: 1,352 (3.56 per match)

The Premier Division consisted of 17 clubs from the previous season Southern Counties East Football League along with three new clubs:

- Bearsted, promoted as winners of the Kent Invicta League
- Sheppey United, promoted as runners-up in the Kent Invicta League
- Whitstable Town, relegated from the Isthmian League

=== League table ===
Pos	Team	Pld	W	D	L	GF	GA	GD	Pts	Promotion or relegation
1	Ashford United	38	30	2	6	119	39	+80	92	Promoted to the Isthmian League South Division
2	Crowborough Athletic	38	28	6	4	96	36	+60	90	
3	Sevenoaks Town	38	27	3	8	90	35	+55	84	
4	Cray Valley Paper Mills	38	24	3	11	91	57	+34	75	
5	Whitstable Town	38	22	3	13	82	51	+31	69	
6	Sheppey United	38	20	8	10	75	55	+20	68	
7	AFC Croydon Athletic	38	18	11	9	75	62	+13	65	
8	Hollands & Blair	38	18	8	12	68	55	+13	62	
9	Canterbury City	38	17	7	14	66	42	+24	58	
10	Corinthian	38	15	7	16	68	64	+4	52	
11	Croydon	38	15	3	20	66	83	−17	48	
12	Bearsted	38	14	5	19	63	73	−10	47	
13	Deal Town	38	11	13	14	66	74	−8	46	
14	Rochester United	38	9	10	19	47	79	−32	37	
15	Tunbridge Wells	38	10	7	21	41	74	−33	37	
16	Lordswood	38	9	7	22	54	101	−47	34	
17	Erith Town	38	9	4	25	50	116	−66	31	
18	Beckenham Town	38	8	5	25	38	76	−38	29	
19	Fisher	38	7	7	24	50	86	−36	28	Relegated to Division One
20	Erith & Belvedere	38	7	5	26	47	94	−47	26	Relegated to Division One

Source: SCEFL Tables
Rules for classification: 1) Points; 2) Goal difference; 3) Number of goals scored

==== Promotion criteria ====
To be promoted at the end of the season a team must:

1. Have applied to be considered for promotion by 30 November 2016
2. Pass a ground grading examination by 31 March 2017
3. Finish the season in a position higher than that of any other team also achieving criteria 1 and 2
4. Finish the season in one of the top three positions

The following eight teams achieved criterion one:

- AFC Croydon Athletic
- Ashford United (missed application deadline but successfully appealed)
- Corinthian
- Crowborough Athletic
- Hollands & Blair
- Sevenoaks Town
- Sheppey United
- Whitstable Town

=== Results ===
Home \ Away	ACA	ASH	BEA	BEC	CAN	COR	CVP	CRW	CRD	DEA	E&B	ERI	FIS	H&B	LOR	ROC	SEV	SHE	TUN	WHT
AFC Croydon Athletic		2–2	3–0	2–0	0–4	0–0	4–1	1–1	3–6	2–2	3–0	5–1	2–1	1–3	4–1	1–1	0–4	2–1	1–1	0–3
Ashford United	3–3		0–1	4–1	1–0	4–1	2–0	3–1	3–2	4–0	2–1	4–1	3–1	3–1	4–0	7–0	3–2	1–2	2–0	4–2
Bearsted	1–5	1–0		2–0	1–0	1–5	0–3	2–3	1–1	1–3	7–1	4–1	3–3	0–1	3–4	2–1	1–2	1–1	3–1	1–2
Beckenham Town	1–3	0–2	2–3		0–4	1–0	0–5	1–3	1–3	3–1	2–4	0–1	2–0	0–2	3–0	1–3	1–2	0–2	0–0	0–2
Canterbury City	0–1	1–3	0–1	3–0		1–1	4–0	0–0	3–0	3–3	2–1	2–1	2–0	1–1	1–3	0–2	0–2	0–1	5–0	0–1
Corinthian	0–2	2–3	2–0	3–0	1–3		3–0	1–3	1–3	1–1	3–1	5–0	3–0	4–4	1–3	3–3	0–4	0–1	5–2	2–2
Cray Valley Paper Mills	3–0	2–5	2–1	3–3	2–0	2–1		0–3	1–1	5–1	3–2	0–1	2–1	3–1	4–1	1–2	2–0	2–1	2–1	4–1
Crowborough Athletic	1–2	2–0	2–1	1–0	4–2	7–1	0–1		0–1	1–1	1–0	2–1	6–1	2–0	2–0	2–0	2–1	3–2	3–0	3–1
Croydon	0–3	0–4	4–2	2–1	1–2	1–3	0–3	0–2		1–2	1–0	6–0	3–1	1–0	3–1	3–4	1–6	2–3	2–0	2–2
Deal Town	2–2	1–4	3–1	2–2	1–0	1–3	1–1	1–6	5–2		6–0	2–4	2–1	1–2	0–0	0–0	1–0	3–4	4–1	0–2
Erith & Belvedere	0–2	2–6	1–2	0–1	1–3	2–1	4–2	0–3	2–6	2–2		4–0	1–1	1–3	1–0	0–0	0–2	0–3	3–2	2–3
Erith Town	4–1	2–3	1–2	0–3	1–2	2–1	0–7	1–7	3–2	1–5	2–1		1–3	1–3	3–3	4–2	1–3	0–4	2–2	1–5
Fisher	1–1	0–5	0–3	2–0	0–0	3–3	0–3	2–6	1–0	2–3	3–0	10–1		3–4	2–0	0–0	0–2	1–3	1–3	0–2
Hollands & Blair	1–2	0–3	1–1	1–1	1–3	1–0	2–4	0–0	3–0	3–0	2–1	2–2	1–3		4–0	2–1	1–0	0–1	0–1	1–0
Lordswood	3–3	0–7	1–4	1–3	1–4	0–2	0–7	2–4	1–3	1–1	4–4	4–1	4–1	0–3		2–1	1–1	2–2	3–0	2–1
Rochester United	3–3	0–8	1–0	0–1	0–5	0–1	1–4	1–1	3–1	2–2	1–0	0–2	0–0	0–4	2–1		3–3	1–2	0–1	3–4
Sevenoaks Town	2–0	4–1	3–2	3–1	4–1	0–1	4–1	1–1	4–0	2–1	5–1	2–0	2–0	5–1	4–0	1–4		2–0	2–0	0–2
Sheppey United	1–3	1–0	3–3	2–0	1–1	0–1	3–4	2–3	1–2	1–1	2–2	1–1	3–1	2–2	3–2	3–1	1–2		2–0	1–0
Tunbridge Wells	1–3	0–5	2–1	2–2	0–0	1–2	1–2	1–2	1–0	2–1	0–2	3–1	2–0	2–2	1–2	2–1	0–2	3–5		1–0
Whitstable Town	3–0	0–2	5–0	3–1	1–4	2–1	1–0	2–3	7–0	2–0	3–0	1–0	4–1	2–4	4–1	2–0	1–2	3–4	1–1	

Legend: Blue = home team win; Yellow = draw; Red = away team win.

=== Top scorers ===
Rank	Player	Club	Goals
1	Warren Mfula	AFC Croydon Athletic	40
2	Shaun Welford	Ashford United	34
3	James McDonald	Hollands & Blair	25
3	Jeff Duah-Kessie	Croydon	25
5	Byron Walker	Sevenoaks Town	22
6	Rory Hill	Ashford United	20
6	Zac Attwood	Crowborough Athletic	20

== Division One ==
Southern Counties East Football League Division One
- Season: 2016–17
- Champions: Glebe
- Promoted: Glebe; Rusthall
- Matches: 342
- Goals: 1,283 (3.75 per match)

Before the start of the season Kent Invicta Football League merged with Southern Counties East League and became Division One.

Division One consisted of 17 clubs from the previous Kent Invicta League season along with two new clubs:

- Holmesdale, relegated from the Premier Division
- Snodland Town, promoted from Kent County League Premier Division

Also, two clubs changed their names:

- APM Contrast was renamed K Sports
- Seven Acre & Sidcup was renamed Sporting Club Thamesmead

=== League table ===
Pos	Team	Pld	W	D	L	GF	GA	GD	Pts	Promotion or qualification
1	Glebe	36	29	5	2	102	24	+78	92	Promoted to the Premier Division
2	Rusthall	36	24	8	4	93	34	+59	80	Promoted to the Premier Division
3	Sutton Athletic	36	23	5	8	122	50	+72	74	
4	Kent Football United	36	24	2	10	85	40	+45	74	
5	K Sports	36	20	8	8	97	63	+34	68	
6	Holmesdale	36	19	6	11	68	53	+15	63	
7	Bridon Ropes	36	15	10	11	60	59	+1	55	
8	Snodland Town	36	16	3	17	59	73	−14	51	
9	Lydd Town	36	14	7	15	68	79	−11	49	
10	Sporting Club Thamesmead	36	12	8	16	60	70	−10	44	
11	FC Elmstead	36	11	10	15	55	64	−9	43	
12	Forest Hill Park	36	12	7	17	50	75	−25	43	
13	Phoenix Sports Reserves	36	13	4	19	65	93	−28	43	
14	Orpington	36	10	10	16	45	58	−13	40	Resigned to the Kent County League
15	Eltham Palace	36	10	9	17	65	82	−17	39	
16	Gravesham Borough	36	8	8	20	62	84	−22	32	
17	Meridian VP	36	9	2	25	45	78	−33	29	
18	Crockenhill	36	6	8	22	37	91	−54	26	
19	Lewisham Borough	36	4	6	26	45	113	−68	18	

Source: SCEFL Tables
Rules for classification: 1) Points; 2) Goal difference; 3) Number of goals scored

=== Results ===
Home \ Away	BRI	CRO	ELT	ELM	FHP	GLB	GRB	HOL	KSP	KFU	LEW	LYD	MER	ORP	PSR	RUS	SNT	SCT	SUT
Bridon Ropes		1–3	3–2	3–2	1–1	0–0	4–2	0–4	1–2	0–1	2–2	1–0	4–0	1–0	2–2	2–2	5–4	1–0	0–6
Crockenhill	0–4		2–2	2–0	1–2	1–3	1–5	1–1	3–3	1–0	1–0	0–2	0–3	1–2	0–0	0–6	0–1	0–0	1–4
Eltham Palace	1–1	5–2		1–1	0–0	0–4	3–5	0–0	0–6	1–5	2–2	2–2	4–2	3–1	5–0	1–4	1–1	1–2	3–5
FC Elmstead	1–2	2–2	3–2		2–1	1–3	2–1	2–2	1–1	0–2	4–1	0–1	1–0	2–2	1–0	0–1	0–1	2–2	1–6
Forest Hill Park	3–3	1–3	1–0	1–2		0–2	2–1	1–0	2–2	1–2	3–1	0–1	2–0	2–0	3–3	0–1	2–0	3–2	1–6
Glebe	4–1	6–1	3–0	1–2	3–0		4–0	1–1	2–1	4–0	4–1	5–0	4–0	3–1	3–0	0–0	4–0	1–2	2–1
Gravesham Borough	0–1	5–1	0–1	2–2	1–1	1–3		0–1	2–2	0–2	2–2	2–4	0–0	2–3	1–0	1–5	1–1	1–4	0–3
Holmesdale	2–0	3–0	0–4	2–2	2–1	0–3	2–1		2–0	1–3	8–1	1–3	2–1	1–1	5–0	1–0	2–1	5–3	0–1
K Sports	1–1	6–3	1–0	4–1	4–1	0–2	4–1	3–1		2–1	6–2	6–3	2–1	4–2	3–4	1–4	3–0	4–4	2–5
Kent Football United	3–0	1–1	5–1	2–1	6–1	0–2	5–0	3–4	0–1		2–1	5–2	2–0	0–1	3–0	2–3	1–0	2–2	0–2
Lewisham Borough	0–4	1–2	2–7	1–0	2–2	1–6	4–3	0–2	2–7	2–4		3–2	1–2	3–2	2–3	2–4	1–2	0–0	1–5
Lydd Town	1–3	4–0	1–3	3–2	0–1	1–1	2–0	3–2	0–3	1–2	3–1		3–5	3–2	2–1	2–2	5–2	3–3	2–1
Meridian VP	0–1	2–0	2–3	2–3	0–1	1–4	1–7	1–2	0–4	0–2	0–0	3–0		4–0	3–5	0–1	0–3	0–1	0–4
Orpington	0–0	1–0	2–2	2–2	4–1	1–3	0–0	0–1	3–0	0–2	1–0	2–2	0–2		0–1	0–0	0–3	3–0	1–1
Phoenix Sports Reserves	4–3	6–1	3–2	0–4	3–5	2–3	3–4	0–2	0–4	1–7	2–0	5–2	4–1	1–1		0–5	5–1	0–2	2–6
Rusthall	1–1	2–0	1–2	3–1	6–1	1–1	2–2	3–1	6–1	2–1	2–1	2–2	1–0	4–0	0–2		3–0	6–0	4–3
Snodland Town	2–1	1–0	3–0	2–0	3–0	0–2	2–3	1–2	1–1	0–3	4–0	4–1	4–3	4–3	4–1	1–3		2–1	1–6
Sporting Club Thamesmead	3–1	2–2	2–0	0–2	4–2	2–4	2–4	3–2	0–1	0–2	5–2	3–1	2–3	0–2	0–1	0–3	1–0		1–2
Sutton Athletic	0–2	4–1	5–1	3–3	3–1	1–2	5–2	6–1	2–2	2–4	5–0	1–1	1–3	0–2	3–1	2–0	9–0	2–2	

Legend: Blue = home team win; Yellow = draw; Red = away team win.

=== Top scorers ===
Rank	Player	Club	Goals
1	Arlie Desanges	Sutton Athletic	34
2	Caine Smith	K Sports	32
3	Ryan Golding	Glebe	27
4	David Sherwood	Snodland Town	23
5	Josh Patrick	SC Thamesmead	22
6	Jonny Murray	Sutton Athletic/Glebe	21
