= 2014–15 Kent Invicta Football League =

Football league season

The 2014–15 Kent Invicta Football League season, known for sponsorship reasons as the Pain & Glory Sports Kent Invicta League, was the fourth in the history of the Kent Invicta Football League, a football competition in England for clubs located in and adjacent to the historic county of Kent.

The league comprised one division and there was also a league cup competition, the Challenge Trophy.

== The League ==
Kent Invicta Football League
- Season: 2014–15
- Champions: Hollands & Blair
- Promoted: Hollands & Blair
- Matches: 240
- Goals: 947 (3.95 per match)

The league featured sixteen clubs of which fifteen competed in the league the previous season, together with one additional club:

- Sheppey United, promoted from the Kent County League

Also, Fleet Leisure changed their name to Gravesham Borough.

For the second successive season Hollands & Blair won the league, this year part of a league and cup double and they gained promotion to the Southern Counties East League.

=== League table ===
Pos	Team	Pld	W	D	L	GF	GA	GD	Pts	Promotion
1	Hollands & Blair	30	27	0	3	132	25	+107	81	Promoted to the Southern Counties East League
2	Bearsted	30	21	4	5	74	34	+40	67	
3	Lydd Town	30	21	3	6	81	37	+44	66	
4	Sutton Athletic	30	20	5	5	68	31	+37	65	
5	Sheppey United	30	18	3	9	75	55	+20	57	
6	Seven Acre & Sidcup	30	16	4	10	56	64	−8	52	
7	Glebe	30	15	6	9	66	36	+30	51	
8	Gravesham Borough	30	11	9	10	66	44	+22	42	
9	Eltham Palace	30	10	7	13	63	62	+1	37	
10	Bridon Ropes	30	10	3	17	40	54	−14	33	
11	Orpington	30	10	2	18	43	53	−10	32	
12	Meridian VP	30	9	4	17	38	63	−25	31	
13	Rusthall	30	7	3	20	49	88	−39	24	
14	Crockenhill	30	6	5	19	33	102	−69	23	
15	Kent Football United	30	5	2	23	31	97	−66	17	
16	Lewisham Borough	30	4	0	26	32	102	−70	12	

Source: FA Full-Time, 2014–15 Football Club History Database
Rules for classification: 1) points; 2) goal difference; 3) number of goals scored.

=== Results ===
Home \ Away	BEA	BRI	CRO	ELT	GLB	GRA	H&B	KFU	LEW	LYD	MER	ORP	RUS	SEV	SHP	SUT
Bearsted		3–1	3–0	2–3	3–1	2–1	0–6	2–1	4–1	2–0	2–1	2–1	4–1	0–0	3–1	1–1
Bridon Ropes	0–2		3–0	1–0	0–0	0–0	0–4	3–0	3–0	2–3	3–1	0–3	2–0	0–1	2–0	2–3
Crockenhill	0–3	3–0		3–3	0–8	1–8	0–7	0–0	3–0	0–4	1–1	1–0	2–2	1–3	1–7	0–3
Eltham Palace	0–2	2–1	6–1		2–2	3–3	1–6	2–0	1–4	1–2	1–3	2–3	5–1	3–1	2–1	1–1
Glebe	1–2	2–2	1–1	2–0		0–2	1–2	0–0	3–1	0–0	5–0	2–1	6–0	2–0	1–2	3–1
Gravesham Borough	0–3	0–2	8–1	6–2	0–4		2–1	7–0	6–1	0–1	1–0	2–1	2–2	1–2	1–1	0–1
Hollands & Blair	1–0	4–0	7–0	3–2	4–0	3–0		4–1	6–1	3–2	4–3	9–0	8–3	4–2	5–1	1–2
Kent Football United	0–6	0–2	2–3	0–4	3–2	1–3	1–5		4–3	0–7	2–3	0–7	5–2	3–1	1–2	0–6
Lewisham Borough	0–4	2–1	1–2	3–2	0–2	1–4	1–10	1–2		0–2	2–1	0–3	0–3	3–4	3–4	0–1
Lydd Town	0–2	3–0	6–1	2–2	2–1	2–1	2–1	4–1	3–0		2–2	5–1	2–1	5–2	3–0	1–5
Meridian VP	2–2	3–2	3–2	0–3	1–3	0–0	0–4	2–1	3–0	0–1		1–3	1–0	0–1	1–4	0–2
Orpington	1–4	1–2	3–0	1–1	0–2	1–1	0–3	3–0	1–0	0–1	0–1		1–0	1–2	0–1	1–2
Rusthall	1–5	3–1	1–2	2–1	1–4	2–2	0–8	5–1	6–0	1–5	3–2	2–4		1–2	0–1	2–1
Seven Acre & Sidcup	4–3	2–1	3–1	3–3	1–3	2–2	0–6	4–1	3–2	2–8	2–1	2–0	3–1		1–5	2–0
Sheppey United	5–3	4–3	2–1	1–4	5–4	4–3	0–2	2–0	8–1	2–0	0–1	3–1	5–2	1–1		1–3
Sutton Athletic	0–0	5–1	4–2	2–1	0–1	0–0	0–1	2–1	3–1	4–3	7–1	2–1	3–1	2–0	2–2	

Source: FA Full-time, Kent Invicta League (archived)
Legend: Blue = home team win; Yellow = draw; Red = away team win.

== Challenge Trophy ==
The 2014–15 Kent Invicta League Challenge Trophy, sponsored by Pain & Glory Sports, was won by Hollands & Blair for the second occasion and part of their league and cup double for the season.

The competition was contested by all sixteen teams from the league over three single tie rounds to reach the final, played on a neutral ground (at Meridian VP this season).

=== First round ===
Sixteen clubs competed in eight first round ties.

Home team	Score	Away team
Lydd Town	1 – 0	Eltham Palace
Meridian VP	2 – 3	Sheppey United
Orpington	1 – 3	Bearsted
Crockenhill	0 – 4	Sutton Athletic
Kent Football United	0 – 9	Hollands & Blair
Rusthall	2 – 3	Gravesham Borough
Glebe	3 – 1 (aet) (1–1 @90 mins)	Seven Acre & Sidcup
Lewisham Borough	0 – 0 (aet); Pens: 4 – 1	Bridon Ropes

=== Quarter-finals, Semi-finals and Final ===
Quarter-finals
Lydd Town	2
Sheppey United	3
Bearsted	1
Sutton Athletic	0
Hollands & Blair	6
Gravesham Borough	1
Lewisham Borough	0
Glebe	2

Semi-finals
Sheppey United	2
Bearsted	3
Hollands & Blair	3
Glebe	1

Final
Bearsted	0
Hollands & Blair	2

Sources: "Kent Invicta League Challenge Trophy". Kent Invicta Football League. Archived from the original on 18 January 2015.; "2014–15 Kent Invicta League: Challenge Trophy". Football Club History Database.; "2014-15 Match Reports: Kent Invicta League Challenge Trophy Final". Kent Invicta Football League. Archived from the original on 26 September 2015.
