= Justin Amaluzor =

English footballer (born 1996)

Personal information
- Full name: Justin Ikechukwu Obiora Amaluzor
- Date of birth: 17 October 1996 (age 30)
- Place of birth: Southwark, England
- Height: 1.83 m (6 ft 0 in)
- Positions: Winger; forward

Team information
- Current team: Grimsby Town
- Number: 14

Youth career
- –2011: Luton Town
- 2011–2013: AFC Kempston Rovers
- 2012: AFC Rushden & Diamonds
- 2013–2015: Dartford
- 2015: Barnet

Senior career*
Years	Team	Apps	(Gls)
2014–2015	Dartford	0	(0)
2015	→ Kent Football United (loan)		
2015–2018	Barnet	19	(0)
2016	→ Hayes & Yeading United (loan)	5	(0)
2017	→ Hemel Hempstead Town (loan)	4	(0)
2017	→ Hemel Hempstead Town (loan)	4	(1)
2017–2018	→ Hampton & Richmond Borough (loan)	3	(0)
2018	→ Bognor Regis Town (loan)	8	(1)
2018–2019	Braintree Town	21	(3)
2019–2021	Maidstone United	48	(12)
2021–2022	Motherwell	10	(0)
2022–2023	Aldershot Town	41	(8)
2023–2025	Altrincham	65	(13)
2025–	Grimsby Town	45	(3)
- * Club domestic league appearances and goals as of 14:17, 6 November 2026 (UTC)

Justin Ikechukwu Obiora Amaluzor (born 17 October 1996) is an English footballer who plays as a forward for EFL League Two club Grimsby Town. He was previously known as Justin Nwogu.

== Career ==
=== Early career ===
Amaluzor played youth football for Luton Town, AFC Kempston Rovers, where he scored 55 goals at U15 and U16 level, and AFC Rushden & Diamonds before joining Dartford on a two-year scholarship in 2013. Amaluzor joined Kent Football United, of the Kent Invicta Football League, on loan in February 2015. Following four goals in his first two games, manager Sam MacNeil said that "Justin has been a revelation so far for us. Coming in as a fresh 18 year old new to senior football he has took his first two games by storm... The boy has tremendous talent and has given us a major threat in behind teams and a natural finish to our moves... During his time with the club he will make a name for himself and I am sure will be playing a very high level of football in years to come."

=== Non-League ===
Amaluzor joined Barnet in April 2015, and played for the under-18s for the remainder of the season before signing a one-year professional contract two months later. He made his League Two debut when he came on as a 53rd-minute substitute for Luke Gambin in a 3–1 win over York City on his 19th birthday on 17 October 2015. Amaluzor, along with teammate Charlie Kennedy, joined Hayes & Yeading United on loan in February 2016. He scored his first goal for Barnet in an EFL Trophy game against Peterborough United on 8 November 2016. He then went on loan to Hemel Hempstead Town in January 2017. He joined Hemel on loan for a second time on 7 September 2017, and then left the club for a fourth loan spell, this time with Hampton & Richmond Borough, in December 2017. He then joined Bognor Regis Town on loan in March 2018. He was released by Barnet at the end of the 2017–18 season.

Amaluzor joined Braintree Town on 31 August 2018. He then signed for Maidstone United on 15 February 2019 on a contract until the end of the following season. Maidstone's Head of Football John Still said "Justin is quick, bright and has got a goal in him. He can play wide on either side – he likes to play on the right and cut in on his left foot, and he can play off the main striker." Amaluzor confirmed in April 2021 that he was leaving Maidstone.

=== Motherwell ===
On 21 June 2021, Motherwell announced the signing of Amaluzor on a one-year contract. He made his debut and scored his first goal for the club in a 2–0 win in a Scottish League Cup group stage match against Annan Athletic on 24 July 2021.

=== Return to Non-League ===
On 17 June 2022, Amaluzor was announced to have returned to England to join National League club Aldershot Town.

On 22 June 2023, Amaluzor signed for fellow National League club, Altrincham for an undisclosed fee.

=== Grimsby Town ===
On 3 June 2025, Amaluzor signed for EFL League Two side Grimsby Town on a two-year deal.

Amaluzor made his competitive debut for the club on 2 August, replacing Darragh Burns in the 83rd minute of a 3–0 home victory over Crawley Town on the opening day of the League Two season.

He scored his first Grimsby goal on 12 August, opening the scoring in a 3–1 home victory over Shrewsbury Town in the first round of the EFL Cup.

== Career statistics ==
As of 6 November 2026

Club	Season	League			National Cup		League Cup		Other		Total	
Club	Season	Division	Apps	Goals	Apps	Goals	Apps	Goals	Apps	Goals	Apps	Goals
Kent Football United (loan)	2014–15	Kent Invicta League	No data currently available									
Barnet	2015–16	League Two	4	0	0	0	0	0	0	0	4	0
Barnet	2016–17	League Two	11	0	1	0	1	0	3 (Note: Appearance in the Football League Trophy)	1	16	1
Barnet	2017–18	League Two	4	0	0	0	2	0	2	0	8	0
Barnet	Total		19	0	1	0	3	0	5	1	28	1
Hayes & Yeading United (loan)	2015–16	National League South	5	0	0	0	0	0	0	0	5	0
Hemel Hempstead Town (loan)	2016–17	National League South	4	0	0	0	0	0	0	0	4	0
Hemel Hempstead Town (loan)	2017–18	National League South	4	1	1	0	0	0	0	0	5	1
Hampton & Richmond (loan)	2017–18	National League South	3	0	0	0	0	0	0	0	3	0
Bognor Regis Town (loan)	2017–18	National League South	8	1	0	0	0	0	0	0	8	1
Braintree Town	2018–19	National League	21	3	1	0	0	0	1 (Note: Appearance in the FA Trophy)	0	23	3
Maidstone United	2018–19	National League	13	3	0	0	0	0	0	0	13	3
Maidstone United	2019–20	National League South	23	7	4	0	0	0	2	0	29	7
Maidstone United	2020–21	National League South	12	2	1	0	0	0	3	0	16	2
Maidstone United	Total		48	12	5	0	0	0	5	0	58	12
Motherwell	2021–22	Scottish Premiership	10	0	1	0	2	1	0	0	13	1
Aldershot Town	2022–23	National League	41	8	0	0	0	0	3	0	45	8
Altrincham	2023–24	National League	37	8	1	0	0	0	0	0	37	8
Altrincham	2024–25	National League	29	4	0	0	0	0	0	0	29	4
Altrincham	Total		66	12	0	0	0	0	0	0	66	12
Grimsby Town	2025–26	League Two	35	3	2	0	2	1	5 (Note: Three appearances in EFL Trophy and Two appearances in League Two play-offs)	0	44	4
Grimsby Town	2025–26	League Two	10	0	0	0	1	0	1	0	12	0
Grimsby Town	Ttotal		45	3	2	0	3	1	6	0	56	4
Career total			274	40	12	0	8	2	20	1	314	43
