= 2015–16 Southern Counties East Football League =

The 2015–16 Southern Counties East Football League season was the 50th in the history of the Southern Counties East Football League (the 3rd since it was renamed from the Kent Football League), a football competition in England. At the end of the season, the league merged with the Kent Invicta League with the latter becoming the lower division of the merged league.

== League table ==
Southern Counties East Football League
- Season: 2015–16
- Champions: Greenwich Borough
- Promoted: Greenwich Borough
- Relegated: Holmesdale
- Matches: 342
- Goals: 1,246 (3.64 per match)

The league consisted of 17 clubs from the previous season along with two new clubs:

- AFC Croydon Athletic, promoted from Combined Counties League Division One
- Hollands & Blair, promoted from the Kent Invicta League

Six clubs applied for promotion to Step 4: AFC Croydon Athletic, Ashford United, Beckenham Town, Corinthian, Greenwich Borough and Hollands & Blair.

=== League table ===
Pos	Team	Pld	W	D	L	GF	GA	GD	Pts	Promotion or relegation
1	Greenwich Borough	36	26	7	3	121	50	+71	85	Promoted to the Isthmian League Division One South
2	Hollands & Blair	36	22	7	7	108	40	+68	73	
3	Ashford United	36	23	7	6	95	46	+49	66 (Note: Ashford United deducted ten points following receivers being called in.)	
4	Lordswood	36	15	14	7	62	44	+18	59	
5	Sevenoaks Town	36	16	10	10	61	50	+11	58	
6	Corinthian	36	15	11	10	73	61	+12	56	
7	Crowborough Athletic	36	14	9	13	65	77	−12	51	
8	Canterbury City	36	15	5	16	64	59	+5	50	
9	Deal Town	36	15	5	16	76	73	+3	50	
10	Cray Valley Paper Mills	36	14	8	14	57	58	−1	50	
11	AFC Croydon Athletic	36	13	7	16	58	64	−6	46	
12	Beckenham Town	36	11	11	14	68	93	−25	44	
13	Erith Town	36	12	7	17	53	73	−20	43	
14	Tunbridge Wells	36	11	6	19	57	61	−4	39	
15	Rochester United	36	10	9	17	43	77	−34	39	
16	Erith & Belvedere	36	10	8	18	54	66	−12	38	
17	Fisher	36	10	7	19	40	79	−39	37	
18	Croydon	36	9	8	19	46	61	−15	35	
19	Holmesdale	36	4	8	24	45	114	−69	20	Relegated to Division One

Source: SCEFL table
Rules for classification: 1) points; 2) goal difference; 3) number of goals scored.

=== Results ===
Home \ Away	ACA	ASH	BEC	CAN	COR	CVP	CRW	CRD	DEA	E&B	ERI	FIS	GRE	H&B	HOL	LOR	ROC	SEV	TUN
AFC Croydon Athletic		1–2	2–6	0–1	1–2	3–4	4–1	2–1	0–0	3–0	2–0	3–0	0–6	0–4	5–1	1–2	0–1	0–1	3–2
Ashford United	3–4		6–1	2–0	1–1	1–0	6–1	2–0	5–3	4–2	1–2	2–1	0–2	2–0	2–1	1–1	4–0	1–1	2–1
Beckenham Town	3–3	3–3		5–2	1–1	1–2	1–1	1–2	2–1	1–0	1–1	3–1	4–4	0–4	1–5	0–2	1–3	2–2	2–1
Canterbury City	0–1	0–2	6–1		3–1	0–1	3–1	1–0	2–1	2–0	0–6	1–2	3–4	2–3	6–0	1–2	1–2	2–3	2–0
Corinthian	5–3	1–2	2–2	1–1		2–1	3–0	3–2	2–3	5–0	3–1	1–0	0–2	3–2	2–2	2–2	1–2	1–2	1–1
Cray Valley Paper Mills	1–1	0–5	2–2	1–3	3–1		4–5	2–0	2–3	1–0	2–0	1–2	1–1	2–1	5–3	3–1	0–0	4–1	0–0
Crowborough Athletic	1–0	1–1	3–5	0–4	2–2	4–3		1–0	2–2	1–1	3–0	2–2	2–4	0–6	6–1	2–1	4–2	3–1	1–1
Croydon	1–2	0–4	7–2	0–1	2–2	0–0	1–3		2–1	2–2	3–1	0–2	2–2	1–1	1–2	1–2	2–3	0–4	1–0
Deal Town	2–0	2–6	1–3	0–3	1–6	2–1	1–2	1–2		3–0	7–0	4–1	4–3	0–3	5–0	4–4	4–1	2–2	4–1
Erith & Belvedere	0–2	2–2	2–0	3–2	2–3	1–3	2–0	1–2	1–0		2–1	7–0	4–0	3–1	5–0	2–2	0–1	1–3	2–2
Erith Town	1–1	0–2	3–2	3–3	3–2	0–0	3–2	3–0	1–3	1–1		0–2	1–7	1–0	2–1	1–1	3–1	0–1	2–1
Fisher	1–1	1–4	0–1	1–1	0–3	2–0	2–2	1–0	1–3	1–1	0–5		2–5	3–6	1–0	1–0	1–1	0–3	0–3
Greenwich Borough	2–0	4–2	2–2	4–0	2–1	3–1	5–1	4–3	4–1	2–0	3–2	4–0		4–4	7–0	1–3	5–0	4–0	1–1
Hollands & Blair	1–0	0–1	6–1	4–1	3–1	3–0	1–0	1–1	3–0	6–0	4–0	6–1	0–0		7–0	3–3	7–2	1–1	2–0
Holmesdale	5–2	2–3	2–4	0–0	1–2	1–3	0–2	1–1	2–2	1–0	1–1	1–4	4–7	0–6		0–0	1–1	0–2	2–7
Lordswood	2–2	3–0	3–2	1–1	2–2	1–1	2–1	1–2	1–0	4–1	5–0	0–0	0–1	1–3	4–0		0–0	0–1	3–2
Rochester United	1–1	0–7	1–1	0–2	1–1	1–2	1–2	1–3	1–4	3–1	2–1	1–2	1–4	3–3	2–0	0–1		1–2	0–4
Sevenoaks Town	0–1	3–3	7–1	3–2	2–3	3–1	2–2	0–0	1–2	0–3	1–3	1–0	1–2	1–2	2–2	0–0	1–1		2–0
Tunbridge Wells	1–4	2–1	0–1	1–2	1–2	2–0	0–1	2–1	3–0	2–2	3–1	3–2	1–4	2–0	4–3	2–3	1–2	0–1	

Updated to match(es) played on 30 April 2016. Source:
Legend: Blue = home team win; Yellow = draw; Red = away team win.

=== Top scorers ===
Correct as of 30 April 2016

Rank	Player	Club	Goals
1	James McDonald	Hollands & Blair	32
2	Mohamed Eisa	Greenwich Borough	31
3	Shaun Welford	Ashford United	30
4	Paul Booth	Ashford United	21
5	Michael Power	Greenwich Borough	20
5	Josh Biddlecombe	Crowborough Athletic	20
7	Rene Rivera	Deal Town	18
7	Raheem Sterling-Parker	AFC Croydon Athletic	18
7	Connor Coyne	Deal Town	18
