= 2013–14 Southern Counties East Football League =

The 2013–14 Southern Counties East Football League season (known as the 2013–14 Hurliman Southern Counties East Football League for sponsorship reasons) was the 48th in the history of Kent Football League renamed the Southern Counties East Football League a football competition in England. In 2013 the league changed its name to the Southern Counties East Football League, to reflect the fact that many of its member clubs no longer played within the county boundaries of Kent.

== League table ==
Southern Counties East Football League
- Season: 2013–14
- Champions: Whyteleafe
- Promoted: Whyteleafe
- Matches: 272
- Goals: 1,028 (3.78 per match)

The league consisted of 15 clubs from the previous season along with two new clubs, promoted from the Kent Invicta League:

- Ashford United
- Phoenix Sports

=== League table ===
Pos	Team	Pld	W	D	L	GF	GA	GD	Pts	Promotion
1	Whyteleafe	32	26	2	4	111	35	+76	80	Promoted to the Isthmian League Division One South
2	Ashford United	32	22	3	7	72	37	+35	69	
3	Erith Town	32	21	4	7	67	43	+24	67	
4	Tunbridge Wells	32	20	5	7	90	47	+43	65	
5	Corinthian	32	16	10	6	60	41	+19	58	
6	Phoenix Sports	32	17	5	10	70	49	+21	56	
7	Cray Valley Paper Mills	32	14	8	10	64	50	+14	50	
8	Beckenham Town	32	15	4	13	76	58	+18	49	
9	Greenwich Borough	32	15	2	15	71	63	+8	47	
10	Holmesdale	32	13	5	14	48	64	−16	44	
11	Lordswood	32	13	3	16	49	79	−30	42	
12	Canterbury City	32	9	5	18	41	63	−22	32	
13	Deal Town	32	9	2	21	46	82	−36	29	
14	Fisher	32	7	7	18	45	77	−32	28	
15	Rochester United	32	7	6	19	43	75	−32	27	
16	Sevenoaks Town	32	5	5	22	44	84	−40	20	
17	Woodstock Sports	32	3	4	25	31	81	−50	13 (Note: Woodstock Sports were reprieved from relegation.)	

Source: FA Full-Time, League Official
Rules for classification: 1) points; 2) goal difference; 3) number of goals scored.

=== Results ===
Home \ Away	ASH	BEC	CAN	COR	CVP	DEA	ERI	FIS	GRE	HOL	LOR	PHO	ROC	SEV	TUN	WHY	WOO
Ashford United		3–0	2–0	1–0	1–1	4–2	0–2	4–1	1–0	2–0	1–2	0–2	2–0	4–2	1–0	2–1	3–1
Beckenham Town	4–2		4–3	2–2	2–3	3–2	0–3	1–1	4–3	6–0	1–1	2–2	5–0	4–2	2–3	1–2	4–0
Canterbury City	1–4	0–2		2–1	1–2	2–0	0–2	1–1	1–4	1–1	5–2	0–2	1–2	1–0	0–0	0–4	3–1
Corinthian	1–0	2–0	2–0		1–1	4–1	1–0	3–1	3–2	1–1	3–4	0–0	1–1	3–0	1–1	1–0	4–1
Cray Valley Paper Mills	0–2	1–3	3–2	1–1		0–1	3–4	3–0	0–0	5–1	1–2	2–2	2–0	0–3	1–1	2–2	4–0
Deal Town	1–4	3–2	1–0	1–2	2–5		1–3	4–5	0–4	2–5	3–0	3–2	0–2	4–0	1–2	3–7	1–0
Erith Town	1–1	1–0	3–1	2–2	3–1	0–0		2–1	3–0	3–2	4–3	2–1	2–1	4–0	2–3	0–3	1–0
Fisher	2–2	0–5	2–1	1–2	1–1	1–2	1–2		1–0	1–4	2–2	1–3	1–2	5–1	2–2	0–4	2–1
Greenwich Borough	0–2	0–4	3–0	5–2	5–1	1–3	0–1	1–0		1–2	3–3	1–7	5–3	7–3	3–1	2–3	4–0
Holmesdale	2–4	1–0	0–0	1–4	0–3	2–0	2–0	3–1	2–3		0–1	1–0	1–3	2–0	1–2	0–7	3–2
Lordswood	1–3	4–3	1–2	1–3	0–4	4–1	3–2	3–2	1–3	1–3		0–1	0–4	0–4	0–1	0–7	2–1
Phoenix Sports	4–3	3–0	3–3	3–2	1–0	2–2	0–1	4–1	1–3	3–0	0–2		2–1	4–1	1–3	1–3	5–0
Rochester United	0–4	2–3	1–4	1–2	1–3	2–1	1–6	2–3	3–1	1–1	0–1	1–2		2–2	1–2	1–3	1–1
Sevenoaks Town	0–4	0–1	0–2	1–1	2–3	2–0	4–2	1–1	0–2	1–2	2–3	2–3	1–1		1–5	3–0	2–3
Tunbridge Wells	2–3	3–1	6–1	2–4	0–5	6–0	4–0	3–0	5–1	2–2	7–1	3–1	8–0	5–2		2–3	2–0
Whyteleafe	2–0	4–1	3–1	3–0	6–2	3–1	3–5	7–2	2–0	3–0	3–0	5–1	2–2	4–0	6–1		4–0
Woodstock Sports	2–3	2–6	1–2	1–1	0–1	3–0	1–1	1–2	1–4	1–3	0–1	1–4	3–1	2–2	0–3	1–2	

Source: FA Full-Time, Counties Eastleague.com/competitions/Results/Results%20Grids.php League Official
Legend: Blue = home team win; Yellow = draw; Red = away team win.

=== Stadia and locations ===
Locations of the 2013–14 Southern Counties East League Premier Division teams (Kent Clubs)
Locations of the 2013–14 Southern Counties East League Premier Division teams (Greater London & Surrey clubs)

Team	Stadium	Capacity
Ashford United	The Homelands Stadium	3,200
Beckenham Town	Eden Park Avenue	1,562
Canterbury City	Safety Net Stadium (groundshare with Herne Bay FC)	4,000
Corinthian	Gay Dawn Farm	
Cray Valley PM	Badgers Sports Ground	
Deal Town	The Charles Sports Ground	
Erith Town	(groundshare with Cray Valley)	
Fisher	Champion Hill (groundshare with Dulwich Hamlet)	3,000
Greenwich Borough	Princes Park (groundshare with Dartford FC)	4,100
Holmesdale	Oakley Road	1,000
Lordswood	Martyn Grove	
Phoenix Sports	Phoenix Sports Ground	
Rochester United	Rochester United Sports Ground	
Sevenoaks Town	Greatness Park	
Tunbridge Wells	Culverden Stadium	3,750
Whyteleafe	Church Road	2,000
Woodstock Sports	The WEM Stadium (groundshare with Sittingbourne FC)	
