= EPFC =

EPFC may refer to:

- East Perth Football Club
- East Preston F.C.
- Eltham Palace F.C.
- Europa Point F.C.
