= CAFC =

CAFC may refer to:

- Canadian Anti-Fraud Centre
- Commission for Assistance to a Free Cuba, U.S. government organization established in 2003 to formulate policies for a democratic transition in Cuba
- United States Court of Appeals for the Federal Circuit
- California Fire Safe Council
- Cobblestone area forming cells in stem cell research
- Corporate-average fuel consumption

Association football clubs:

- Charlton Athletic F.C.
- Crewe Alexandra F.C.
- Cadbury Athletic F.C.
- Carshalton Athletic F.C.
- Consett A.F.C.
- Cork Alberts F.C.
- Cork Athletic F.C.
- Crown Alexandra F.C.
- Croydon Athletic F.C.
- Curzon Ashton F.C.
