= RUFC =

RUFC may refer to:

- A rugby union football club (see also Category:Rugby union teams)

== Association football teams ==
=== England ===
- Ramsbottom United F.C.
- Retford United F.C.
- Rochester United F.C.
- Rossendale United F.C., dissolved
- Rotherham United F.C., in the English football league

=== Elsewhere ===
- Rakhine United F.C., Myanmar
- Risca United F.C., Wales
