= AC London F.C. =

Association football club in England

Coordinates: 51°18′17.021″N 0°4′46.841″W

AC London
- Full name: Academic Club London Football Club
- Founded: 2012
- Dissolved: 2018
- Ground: Crystal Palace National Sports Centre (2015–16); Merland Rise (2016–17); Church Road (2017–18)
Home colours	Away colours

Academic Club London Football Club, commonly known as AC London, was a semi-professional football club based in London, England. The club was expelled from the Combined Counties Football League in November 2018 and folded.

== History ==
The club was established by Prince Choudary as a youth team in July 2012 as a response to the 2011 London riots, before adding a full age team the following year, with Choudary becoming the youngest manager and chairman in senior football. They applied to join the Kent Invicta League for the 2015–16 season, and despite initially being turned down, were eventually accepted. They finished tenth in their first season, after which they were transferred to the Combined Counties League. In 2016–17 the club won the Division One Challenge Cup, beating Redhill in the final.

In 2017–18 AC London participated in the FA Cup for the first time, making Prince Choudary the youngest manager in FA Cup history. However, at the end of the 2017–18 season, the club were expelled from the Combined Counties League by a vote at a league EGM due to "the organisation and management of the club [falling] below the standards appropriate to membership of the competition." However, the club started the 2018–19 season still in the league after the club appealed and whilst a FA investigation was carried out. When the investigation was concluded in November 2018, the club were removed from the league.

=== Season-by-season ===
Season	Division	Position	Significant events
2015–16	Kent Invicta League	10/20	Transferred to the Combined Counties League
2016–17	Combined Counties League Division One	7/18	Division One Challenge Cup Winners
2017–18	Combined Counties League Division One	8/19	
2018–19	Combined Counties League Division One	–	Expelled from the league in November 2018

== Ground ==
During the 2015–16 season the club played at the 16,000-capacity Crystal Palace National Sports Centre, before moving to Banstead Athletic's Merland Rise ground for the 2016–17 season. They relocated to Whyteleafe's Church Road ground in 2017.

== Honours ==
- Combined Counties League
  - Division One Challenge Cup winners 2016–17

== Records ==
- Best FA Cup performance: Preliminary round, 2017–18
- Best FA Vase performance: First round, 2016–17

== See also ==
- AC London F.C. players
