= Crown Alexandra F.C. =

Coordinates: 51.43521°N 0.234037°E

Crown Alexandra
- Full name: Crown Alexandra Football Club
- Nickname(s): The Crown
- Founded: 2007
- Dissolved: 2013
- Ground: Leigh Technology Academy, Dartford
- 2012–13: Kent Invicta Football League 17th (resigned)
Home colours	Away colours

Crown Alexandra Football Club was a football club located in Dartford, in Kent, England

== History ==
Crown Alexandra was formed by Michael Day in July 2007. The club started out in the Kent Suburban Sunday League in Division Four and rose through the leagues via four promotions to the Premier Division. They won the League in 2008–09. In July 2012, Crown were elected to the Kent Invicta Football League, despite finishing eighth in the South London Alliance Division Three. They resigned from the Kent Invicta Football League in December 2012. In July 2013, the club's committee decided to move the club back to one Sunday team playing in the Woolwich and Eltham Sunday Football Alliance.

== Colours ==
The home kit was blue shirts with a white central stripe, blue shorts and blue socks. The away kit was orange shirts with a black central stripe, black shorts and orange socks.

== Ground ==
The club played its home matches at the Leigh Technology Academy, Green Street Green Road, Dartford, Kent, DA1 1QE

== Honours ==
- Kent Suburban League
  - Division Four champions 2008–09
