= Hollands & Blair F.C. =

Association football club in England

Coordinates: 51.3710°N 0.5625°E

Hollands & Blair
- Full name: Hollands & Blair Football Club
- Nickname: Blair
- Founded: 1970
- Ground: Star Meadow, Gillingham
- Chairmen: Paul Piggott and Phil Knights
- Manager: Ian Draycott
- League: Southern Counties East League Premier Division
- 2025–26: Southern Counties East League Premier Division, 7th of 19
| Home colours | Away colours |

Hollands & Blair Football Club is a football club based in Gillingham, Kent, England. They are currently members of the Southern Counties East League Premier Division and play at the Star Meadow.

== History ==
The club was established in 1970 as H & B United, joining Division Six of the Rochester & District League. Their first match was played on 12 September away to Halfway House and ended in a 4–2 defeat. The club merged with a works team named Hollands & Blair in 1973; H & B United became the reserve team, with the first team continuing on from Hollands & Blair in Division One. However, the first team folded at the end of the 1973–74 season, with H & B United continuing under the Hollands & Blair name in Division Four. In 1974–75 they were Division Four runners-up, earning promotion to Division Two. The club finished as Division Two runners-up the following season and were promoted to Division One. They were Division One runners-up in 1976–77, earning a third successive promotion, this time to the Premier Division.

Hollands & Blair won the Premier Division title in 1989–90, and again in 1993–94. After back-to-back titles in 2002–03 and 2003–04, the club moved up to Division Two East of the Kent County League. They won Division Two East at the first attempt, earning promotion to Division One. The club were Division One East champions the following season and were promoted to the Premier Division. They won the Premier Division title in 2008–09, and after finishing as runners-up the following season, won the league again in 2010–11. In 2011 the club were founder member of the Kent Invicta League. After winning the Challenge Cup and finishing as runners-up in 2012–13, they won successive league titles in 2013–14 and 2014–15, also winning both the Challenge Trophy and the Challenge Shield in 2014–15.

After their second Kent Invicta League title, Hollands & Blair were promoted to the Southern Counties East League and were runners-up in their first season in the league, as well as winning the Challenge Cup. At the end of the 2015–16 season the Kent Invicta League became Division One of the Southern Counties East League, with Hollands and Blair becoming members of the Premier Division. In 2016–17 the club won the league's Challenge Shield. They won the cup for the second time in the 2022–23 season.

== Ground ==
The club initially played at Beechings Green and then at the Civil Service Ground, the APCM ground in Cliffe and Beechings Cross, before moving to Star Meadow. A stand was built in the 2010s and floodlights installed in 2014. The first match under the floodlights was played in November 2014, a Kent Invicta Challenge Shield match against Sutton Athletic and attracted a then-record crowd of 232. This was broken on 26 March 2016 when 405 watched a Southern Counties East League match against title challengers Greenwich Borough. In 2023, the club installed at 3G pitch at Star Meadow, after spending nearly a year away from the ground due to the installation of the new surface.

== Honours ==
- Southern Counties East League
  - Challenge Cup winners 2015–16, 2022–23
  - Challenge Shield winners 2016–17
- Kent Invicta League
  - Champions 2013–14, 2014–15
  - Challenge Trophy winners 2012–13
  - Challenge Shield winners 2014–15, 2015–16
- Kent County League
  - Premier Division champions 2008–09, 2010–11
  - Division One East champions 2005–06
  - Division Two East champions 2004–05
  - Inter-Regional Challenge Cup winners 2008–09, 2009–10
- Rochester & District League
  - Premier Division champions 1989–90, 1993–94, 2002–03, 2003–04
  - Quarter Century Cup winners 1978–79, 1982–83, 1983–84, 1991–92, 2002–03, 2003–04
- Kent Senior Trophy
  - Winners 2011–12
- Kent Intermediate Challenge Shield
  - Winners 2005–06, 2008–09, 2010–11
- Kent Junior Cup
  - Group A winners 2003–04

== Records ==
- Best FA Cup performance: Preliminary round, 2016–17, 2025–26
- Best FA Vase performance: First round, 2016–17, 2023–24
- Record attendance: 660 vs Deal Town, Southern Counties East League Premier Division, 18 February 2023
- Most appearances: Mick Moran, 399
- Most goals: James McDonald, 184

== See also ==
- Hollands & Blair F.C. players
