= Kent Invicta Football League =

- Founded: 2011
- Folded: 2016
- Country: England
- Divisions: 1
- Number of clubs: 20
- Level on pyramid: 10
- Promotion to: Southern Counties East League
- Relegation to: Kent County League
- Domestic cup: Kent Invicta League Cup
- Last champions: Bearsted (2015–16)

The Kent Invicta Football League was a football league in England, formed in 2011 to commence operations for the 2011–12 season. It covered the traditional English county of Kent, some of which is now in Greater London. It merged with the Southern Counties East League in 2016, forming its lower division.

== History ==
Negotiations began in 2009 to form a new Step 6 division (level 10 in the overall English football league system) to make promotion and relegation between the Kent League (Step 5, now Southern Counties East Football League) and Kent County League (Step 7) a less steep transition. There had not been a relegation to the Kent County League for a number of seasons and promotions had been infrequent.

=== Founder Clubs ===
The inaugural 2011–12 season of the league featured the following sixteen clubs, fourteen of which were from the previous season's Kent County League (KCL) together with two other clubs.

- From KCL Premier Division:
  - Bearsted
  - Bly Spartans
  - Bridon Ropes
  - Hollands & Blair
  - Lewisham Borough
  - Phoenix Sports
  - Rusthall
  - Sutton Athletic
  - Woodstock Park
- From KCL Division One West:
  - Crockenhill
  - Orpington
- From KCL Division Two East:
  - Lydd Town
- From KCL Division Two West:
  - Meridian S & S
  - Seven Acre & Sidcup (formerly Seven Acre Sports)
- Others
  - Ashford United, re-formed club
  - Erith & Dartford Town, from South London Football Alliance

=== 2012 to 2015 ===
During the five seasons of its existence the league took a further seven clubs from the Kent County League (four promoted from its Premier Division and three elected to membership in 2015 from its lower divisions) and three clubs from elsewhere. In the first four seasons four clubs (in irregular quantities) were promoted to the Kent League/Southern Counties East League (SCEFL) and two gained promotion to the newly named SCEFL Premier Division coincident with the leagues' amalgamation.

From 2014–15 the league was sponsored by Pain & Glory Sports.

=== Final clubs ===
After the 2015–16 season, the league merged with the Southern Counties East League (SCEFL) and became its lower division (Division One). In order to be accepted into the SCEFL clubs were required to have floodlighting at their grounds. All but one (AC London) of the twenty clubs from the final Kent Invicta League season became SCEFL members for the 2016–17 season and these included twelve clubs who had been founder members of the league (including Phoenix Sports whose Reserves team were now members following earlier promotion of their first team).

- AC London, to Combined Counties League
- APM Contrast
- Bearsted†
- Bridon Ropes†
- Crockenhill†
- Eltham Palace
- FC Elmstead
- Forest Hill Park
- Glebe
- Gravesham Borough
- Kent Football United (formerly Erith & Dartford Town)†
- Lewisham Borough†
- Lydd Town†
- Meridian VP†
- Orpington†
- Phoenix Sports† Reserves
- Rusthall†
- Seven Acre & Sidcup†
- Sheppey United
- Sutton Athletic†

† = Founder clubs

=== Challenge Trophy ===
The league organised a knockout competition, the Challenge Trophy. During the 2011–12 and over the 2012–13 seasons this was sponsored by Sandom Robinson. In the following season, 2013–14, sponsorship was provided by Pain & Glory Sports and this continued over the following two seasons.

== List of League Champions and Challenge Trophy winners ==
Season	League Champions	Challenge Trophy Winners
2011–12	Bly Spartans	Bly Spartans
2012–13	Phoenix Sports	Hollands & Blair
2013–14	Hollands & Blair	Sutton Athletic
2014–15	Hollands & Blair	Hollands & Blair
2015–16	Bearsted	Glebe
