= Lewisham Borough F.C. =

Association football club in England

Lewisham Borough
- Full name: Lewisham Borough (Community) Football Club
- Nickname: The Boro
- Founded: 2003
- Ground: Ladywell Arena, Catford
- Chairman: Danny Fairman
- Manager: Lloyd Davis
- League: Southern Counties East League Division One
- 2025–26: Southern Counties East League Division One, 15th of 18
Home colours	Away colours

Lewisham Borough (Community) Football Club is a football club based in Catford, in the London Borough of Lewisham. Formed by a merger of three clubs in 2003, they are currently members of the Southern Counties East League Division One and play at the Ladywell Arena.

== History ==
The club was established in 2003 as a merger of Elms, Moonshot and Ten Em Bee. They were admitted to Division One West of the Kent County League and went to win the division at the first attempt. The club were promoted to the Premier Division, which they won in 2005–06. In 2011 they were founder members of the Kent Invicta League. The club subsequently finished bottom of the league in 2012–13, 2014–15 and 2015–16. In 2016 the Kent Invicta league merged into the Southern Counties East League, becoming its Division One. Lewisham finished bottom of the division again in its inaugural season.

Shortly before the start of the 2018–19 season, Lewisham resigned from the Southern Counties East League. However, they were reinstated to the league a day later. In 2023–24 the club finished fifth in Division One, qualifying for the promotion play-offs. In the semi-finals they lost to Larkfield & New Hythe Wanderers on penalties after the game had finished 0–0. However, they went on to win the Division One Cup, beating the same opponents 3–2 in the final.

== Honours ==
- Southern Counties East League
  - Division One Cup winners 2023–24
- Kent County League
  - Premier Division champions, 2005–06
  - Division One West champions, 2003–04

== Records ==
- Best FA Vase performance: Second qualifying round, 2023–24, 2025-26, 2026–27
- Record attendance: 398 vs Forest Hill Park, Southern Counties East League Division One, 7 September 2024

== See also ==
- Lewisham Borough F.C. players
