= Eltham Palace F.C. =

Coordinates: 51.39125°N 0.162664°E

Eltham Palace
- Full name: Eltham Palace Football Club
- Founded: 1961
- Dissolved: 2016
- Ground: Foxbury Avenue, Chislehurst
Home colours	Away colours

Eltham Palace Football Club was a football club based in Chislehurst, Greater London, England.

== History ==
The club was established in 1961. By the late 1970s they were playing in the Western Section of the Kent County League. After finishing as Division Two runners-up in 1979–80, the club were promoted to Division One. They were Division One runners-up in 1981–82, earning promotion to the Premier Division. However, their first season in the Premier Division saw them finish bottom of the table, resulting in relegation back to Division One. In 1987–88 the club were Division One runners-up again and were promoted to the Premier Division.

Following league reorganisation, Eltham Palace were placed in Division Two (West) for the 1992–93 season. Despite finishing bottom of the division in 2001–02, the club were not relegated. They finished as runners-up in 2009–10, earning promotion to Division One West. The following season saw them again finish as runners-up in their division, earning a second successive promotion, this time to the Premier Division. A third-place finish in 2011–12 was enough to allow the club to move up to the Kent Invicta League. In 2016, the league merged with the Southern Counties East League, becoming the league's Division One.

In July 2016 the club was taken over by Stansfeld O&BC of the Kent County League. However, they continued playing under the Eltham Palace name until the end of the 2016–17 season.

A Sunday League team of the same name was established in 2020, playing in the Woolwich and Eltham Sunday Football Alliance.
