= Sheppey Sports F.C. =

Association football club in England

Coordinates: 51.4213°N 0.7668°E

Sheppey Sports
- Full name: Sheppey Sports Football Club
- Nicknames: The Paperboys, The Rams
- Founded: 1919
- Ground: Holm Park, Isle of Sheppey
- Chairman: George Batten
- Manager: Vacant
- League: Southern Counties East League Division One
- 2025–26: Southern Counties East League Division One, 9th of 18
| Home colours | Away colours |

Club badge as K Sports

Sheppey Sports Football Club is a football club based on the Isle of Sheppey in Kent, England. They are currently members of the Southern Counties East League Division One and play at Holm Park.

== History ==
The club was established in 1919 as Aylesford Paper Mills. In 1928 they joined Division Two of the Kent League, winning the division in 1929–30, 1930–31 and 1931–32, earning promotion to Division One after their third title. Although they finished bottom of the division in 1934–35 (a season in which the club's reserves were runners-up in Division Two), the league was reduced to a single division for the following season, with the reserve team excluded.

They rejoined the Kent League in 1946 and were placed in Division Two. After winning the division at the first attempt, they were promoted to Division One, where they finished second-from-bottom of the league in the first three seasons and then last in the table in 1950–51. They then switched to the Premier Division of the London League, where they played for three seasons until leaving the league. The club subsequently joined the Kent County League, winning the Senior Division West in 1959–60 and 1963–64. However, they folded towards the end of the 1960s.

The club was reformed in 1974 and returned to the Kent County League. In the mid-1980s they were renamed Reed International, winning the Junior Challenge Cup in 1986–87 and the Premier Division West in 1987–88, before reverting to their original name and winning the division again in 1990–91. They were renamed APM Mears in 2003, before becoming APM in 2010 and APM Contrast in 2011 following the signing of a sponsorship deal with Contrast South East. They finished second in Division One East in 2010–11, earning promotion to the Premier Division. After finishing fourth in the Premier Division in 2015, the club was promoted to the Kent Invicta League. At the end of the 2015–16 season the league became Division One of the Southern Counties East League. In 2016 the club adopted the name K Sports.

In 2017–18 K Sports were Division One runners-up, earning promotion to the Premier Division. They were relegated back to Division One at the end of the 2022–23 season after finishing bottom of the Premier Division.

Following the club's relocation to the Isle of Sheppey, the club was renamed Sheppey Sports.

== Ground ==
The club played at the Cobdown Sports & Social Club (renamed K Sports Cobdown in 2016) from their establishment until 2024 when it was taken over by Welling Town (who had also taken over the other teams run by K Sports with the exception of the first team in 2023).

After leaving Cobdown the club relocated to the Isle of Sheppey, groundsharing with Sheppey United at Holm Park.

== Honours ==
- Kent League
  - Division Two champions 1929–30, 1930–31, 1931–32, 1946–47
- Kent County League
  - Senior Division West champions 1959–60, 1963–64
  - Premier Division West champions 1990–91
  - Junior Challenge Cup winners 1986–87

== See also ==
- Sheppey Sports F.C. players
