= Orpington F.C. =

Association football club in England

Coordinates: 51.39125°N 0.162675°E

Orpington FC
- Full name: Orpington Football Club
- Nickname: The Os
- Founded: 1939
- Ground: Goddington Park; Orpington
- Capacity: 1000
- Chairman: Tom Shrubshall
- Manager: Steve Tindle
- League: Kent County League Division One West
- 2024–25: Kent County League Division One West, 5th of 15
Home colours	Away colours	Third colours

Orpington Football Club is a county level football club based in Orpington, Greater London, although the club is based in Goddington Park in Orpington. The club is a FA Charter Standard Community Club.

== History ==
Orpington F.C. was founded in 1880 and had played in local leagues up until the 1920s before folding for unknown reasons. The current incarnation of the club was founded in 1939. From 1970 to 1998 (with a brief spell in the London Spartan League Intermediate Division from 1987 to 1991) the club played in the South London Alliance, winning the league a number of times. Since then the O's have been playing in the Kent County League, reaching the Premier Division in 2007–08 before relegation in 2009–10 left them in Division One West. Despite finishing 4th in 2010–11, the club were announced as founder members of the Step 6 Kent Invicta Football League on 2 June 2011.

In their first game in the Kent Invicta Football League, Orpington lost 2–1 to Bearsted. The club endured a miserable start to the season and eventually finished bottom of the league, with 24 points. Their second season, under the leadership of former goalkeeper Sean Glover, saw a massive improvement as the club finished comfortably in mid-table with a 9th-place finish. The 2013–14 season saw another step forward under Sean Glover as the club finished a respectable 5th.

Byron Beard was appointed as manager of the first team for the 2014–15 with Sean Glover having resigned, Byron later stepped down during the 2015–16 season as Marc Bentz took over until the end of the 2016–17 season, each coach ensuring mid-table finishes. However, at the end of the season, financial problems led to the board resigning from the Southern Counties East Football League and dissolve their first team, with the reserves taking their place in the Kent County League. Appointing Steve Hall as manager, they were admitted to Division One West for the coming season, along with announcing a move from Green Court Sports Club to Goddington Dene, sharing with Westcombe Park RFC. An abysmal season followed, losing all of their first 10 games and conceding 75 goals in the process. Relegation followed, however the club stabilised the next season, finishing in 5th place.

On 10 July 2019, the club's offices in Goddington Park were broken into and ransacked, taking equipment and trophies.

== Ground ==
Orpington FC's First Team play their home games at Goddington Park in Orpington. The club's youth and other senior teams play on Saturdays and Sundays also at Goddington Park in Orpington.

== Youth teams ==
The club operates a soccer school and has 21 youth teams (including 3 girls' teams) from under 7–21 age groups, making it one of the largest youth football clubs in Bromley. All youth games are played at Goddington Park. All matches are played within the SELKENT league on Sundays.

The youth teams are overlooked by members of the executive committee, each with roles designed to ensure the progression and development of all the coaches, players and the club as a whole.

== Honours ==
Orpington have won two leagues and four cup competitions in their history.

- Kent County Football League Premier Division
  - Runners-up 2007–08
- Kent County Football League Division One West
  - Champions 2006–07
  - Runners-up 2004–05, 2005–06
- Kent County Football League Division Two West
  - Champions 2003–04
- GR Roofing Champions Trophy
  - Winners 2005–06
- KCFL Inter-Regional Challenge Cup
  - Winners 2004–05
  - Runners-up 2008–09
- West Kent Challenge Shield
  - Winners 2005–06, 2006–07
