= Petts Wood & Holmesdale F.C. =

Association football club in England

Coordinates: 51°22′27″N 0°02′15″E

Petts Wood & Holmesdale
- Full name: Petts Wood & Holmesdale Football Club
- Nickname: The Dalers
- Founded: 1956
- Ground: Oakley Road, Bromley
- Chairman: Phil Alder
- Manager: Andy Constable and Pete Nolan
- League: Southern Counties East League Premier Division
- 2025–26: Southern Counties East League Premier Division, 15th of 19
Home colours	Away colours

Petts Wood & Holmesdale Football Club is a football club originally based in South Norwood, London, England. Affiliated to the Kent County Football Association, they are currently members of the Southern Counties East League Premier Division and play at Oakley Road in Bromley.

== History ==
The original club was established as Holmesdale Baptists in the early 1920s and was affiliated with the Baptist Church on Holmesdale Road; players were church members and had to attend bible classes. They joined the Excelsior League, where they played for two seasons before joining Division Three of the Thornton Heath & District League for the 1922–23 season. Although they were Division Three runners-up in their first season, the club folded in 1923. The club was reformed in 1956 by the 3rd East Surrey Boys Brigade Company and rejoined the Thornton Heath & District League in Division Six. They went on to win the division at the first attempt, earning promotion to Division Five. Another promotion in 1957–58 saw the club move up to Division Four, although they had to recruit players from another church club, which led to them dropping the word "Baptists" from the name. By 1960 the club had been promoted to Division Three.

In 1960–61 Holmesdale were Division Three runners-up, earning promotion to Division Two. They following season the club were Division Two champions and were promoted to Division One. The 1971–72 season saw the club win the Division title. In 1986–87 they were Premier Division champions, and were promoted to the Surrey Intermediate League. They were runners-up in Premier Division B in 1989–90, before winning the Surrey South Eastern Combination in 1992–93. The club were subsequently promoted to the Surrey Premier League. They won the league's Charity Cup in 1993–94. In 2000 the club relocated to Bromley and switched to the Kent County League, joining Division One West.

In 2005–06 Holmesdale were Division One West champions, earning promotion to the Premier Division. The following season saw them win the Premier Division title, resulting in promotion to the Kent League. The league was renamed the Southern Counties East League in 2013, and in 2015–16 the club finished bottom of the league, resulting in relegation to the newly-formed Division One. In 2021 the club were promoted to the Premier Division based on their results in the abandoned 2019–20 and 2020–21 seasons. In 2026 the club merged with local amateur club Petts Wood and was renamed Petts Wood & Holmesdale.

== Ground ==
The club played at Oaks Road in Shirley during their time in the Surrey Premier League, but were unable to install floodlights as the ground was owned by Croydon Council. As a result, they moved to Oakley Road in Bromley to gain promotion to the senior leagues, although three teams continued playing at Oaks Road, later breaking away to form Real Holmesdale Football Club in 2001.

== Honours ==
- Kent County League
  - Premier Division champions 2006–07
  - Division One West champion 2005–06
- Surrey Premier League
  - Charity Cup winners 1993–94
- Surrey South Eastern Combination
  - Premier Division champions 1992–93
- Thorton Heath and District League
  - Premier Division champions 1986–87
  - Division One champions 1971–72
  - Division Two champions 1961–62
  - Division Six champions 1956–57
  - Senior Cup winners 1972–73, 1979–80
- Surrey Intermediate Cup
  - Winners 2005–06

== Records ==
- Best FA Cup performance: First qualifying round, 2026–27
- Best FA Vase performance: Fourth round, 2023–24
- Most goals: M. Barnett, 410 in 429 games
- Record win: 12-1 vs Crockenhill, 20 January 2018, Southern Counties East Football League Division One
