= Chislehurst Glebe F.C. =

Association football club in England

Coordinates: 51.4189°N 0.08468°E

Chislehurst Glebe
- Full name: Chislehurst Glebe Football Club
- Founded: 1995
- Ground: Foxbury Avenue, Chislehurst
- Capacity: 1,200
- Chairman: Rocky McMillan
- Manager: Vacant
- League: Southern Counties East League Premier Division
- 2025–26: Southern Counties East League Premier Division, 17th of 19
Home colours	Away colours

Chislehurst Glebe Football Club is a football club based in Chislehurst in the London Borough of Bromley, England. Affiliated to both the Kent County Football Association and the London Football Association, they are currently members of the Southern Counties East League Premier Division and play at Foxbury Avenue.

== History ==
The club was established by Rocky McMillan as Glebe Globetrotters in 1995, and was initially based in West Wickham. They were initially a youth team and were members of the Kent Youth League in 2013, when an adult team was formed and joined the Kent Invicta League. In 2016 the league merged into the Southern Counties East League, becoming its Division One. In 2015–16 they won the London Senior Trophy, beating Tooting Bec 4–1 in the final.

In 2016–17 Glebe won the Division One title, earning promotion to the Premier Division. They finished third in the Premier Division in 2023–24 and qualified for the promotion play-offs, in which they were beaten 2–1 by Erith Town in the semi-finals. In June 2025 the club announced a name change to Chislehurst Glebe, with the change to be phased in over the next two years.

== Ground ==
After joining the Kent Invicta League, the club played at Holmesdale's Oakley Road ground in Bromley. In 2014 they obtained a 25-year lease on Foxbury Avenue ground in Chislehurst, the former ground of Old Elthamians rugby club. The first match at the new ground on 18 July 2015 saw the club lose 3–2 to Canterbury City in front of a crowd of 42.

== Honours ==
- Southern Counties East League
  - Division One champions 2016–17
- London Senior Trophy
  - Winners 2015–16

== Records ==
- Best FA Cup performance: Second qualifying round, 2017–18
- Best FA Vase performance: Fourth round, 2019–20, 2021–22

== See also ==
- Chislehurst Glebe F.C. managers
