= Rochester United F.C. =

Association football club in England

Coordinates: 51.3991°N 0.4672°E

Rochester United
- Full name: Rochester United Football Club
- Nickname: The Spartans
- Founded: 1982
- Ground: Rochester United Sports Ground, Strood
- Owner: Matt Hume
- Chairman: Matt Hume
- Manager: Matt Hume
- League: Southern Counties East League Division One
- 2025–26: Southern Counties East League Division One, 3rd of 18
- Website: rochesterunited.co.uk
Home colours	Away colours

The club's badge when they were named Bly Spartans

Rochester United Football Club is a football club based in Strood, Kent, England. They are currently members of the Southern Counties East League Division One and play at the Rochester United Sports Ground.

== History ==
The club was founded as Bly Spartans in 1982 by Bernard Hurst and joined the Sunday Medway Football League. In 1997 they switched to Saturday football, joining Division One of the Rochester & District League. The club won the division at the first attempt, earning promotion to the Premier Division. In 2000 they moved up to Division Three West of the Kent County League, and were runners-up in their first season, earning promotion to Division Two West. The club were Division Two West runners-up the following season, securing promotion to Division One West, also winning the Division Two West Invitation Cup, defeating Danson Furness Athletic on penalties in the final.

In 2003–04 Bly Spartans were Division One West runners-up, but were not promoted to the Premier Division. They were runners-up again in 2006–07, also winning the Inter-Regional Challenge Cup, beating Bearsted 2–1 in the final. The club were transferred to Division One East for the 2007–08 season, which saw them win the Division One East title, earning promotion to the Premier Division. They also won the league's Les Leckie Cup, beating AFC Sheppey 2–0 in the final, and the Eastern Floodlit Cup with a 4–1 over New Romney in the final, as well as reaching the final of the Inter-Regional Challenge Cup, where they lost 2–1 to Fleet Leisure.

In 2011 Bly Spartans were founder members of the Kent Invicta League and were champions and league Challenge Cup winners in its inaugural season, earning promotion to the Kent League. In the summer of 2012 the club adopted their current name. The Kent League was renamed the Southern Counties East League in 2013, and the club finished bottom of the league in 2014–15. The following year the Kent Invicta League merged into the Southern Counties East League, becoming its Division One while the previous sole division of the Southern Counties East League became the Premier Division. Rochester finished bottom of the Premier Division in 2017–18 and were relegated to Division One.

== Ground ==
The club play at the Rochester United Sports Ground on Rede Court Road in Strood.

== Honours ==
- Kent Invicta League
  - Champions 2011–12
  - Challenge Shield winners 2012
- Kent County League
  - Division One East champions 2007–08
  - Inter-Regional Challenge Cup winners 2006–07
  - Les Leckie Cup winners 2007–08
  - Floodlight Cup winners 2007–08
  - Division Two West Invitation Cup winners 2001–02
- Rochester & District League
  - Division One champions 1997–98

== Records ==
- Best FA Cup performance: First qualifying round, 2015–16
- Best FA Vase performance: Second round 2024–25

== See also ==
- Rochester United F.C. players
