= Bearsted F.C. =

Association football club in England

Coordinates: 51.2451°N 0.5715°E

Bearsted
- Full name: Bearsted Football Club
- Nickname: The Bears
- Founded: 1895
- Ground: Honey Lane, Otham
- Chairman: Jamie Houston
- Manager: Kevin Stevens
- League: Southern Counties East League Premier Division
- 2024–25: Southern Counties East League Premier Division, 12th of 20
- Website: https://www.bearstedfc.co.uk
Home colours	Away colours

Bearsted Football Club is a football club located in Bearsted, near Maidstone, in Kent, England. The club are currently members of the Southern Counties East League Premier Division and play at Honey Lane in Otham.

== History ==
Bearsted Football Club was formed in 1895, and later became members of the Maidstone & District League. They won Division Six in 1961–62, before starting a successful spell in the mid-1970s that saw them win Division Three in 1973–74, Division Two the following season and Division One in 1977–78, before claiming consecutive Premier Division titles in 1979–80, 1980–81 and 1980–82.

After their third title, Bearsted moved up to the Kent County League, entering Division Two of the Western Section. They won the division at the first attempt, earning promotion to Division One, which they also won in their first season in the division. The next two seasons saw them finish as runners-up, before they won the Premier Division in 1986–87, earning promotion to the Senior Division. Their first season in the Senior Division saw them become league champions.

Following league restructuring in 1992, Bearsted were placed in Division One (West). After finishing as runners-up in 1995–96, they won the division in 1996–97, earning promotion to the Premier Division. They finished as runners-up in 1999–2000, before winning back-to-back league titles in 2000–01 and 2001–02. After finishing eighth in 2010–11, the club became founder members of the Kent Invicta League in 2011. The 2014–15 season saw them finish as runners-up, and they went on to win the league title and the Challenge Shield in 2015–16, earning promotion to the Premier Division of the Southern Counties East League, which the Kent Invicta League had merged into.

== Ground ==
The club played at the Green in Bearsted from its establishment until 1998, when they moved to Otham Sports Club on Honey Lane in Otham in order to meet ground grading requirements to play at a higher level.

== Honours ==
- Kent Invicta League
  - Champions 2015–16
  - Challenge Shield winners 2015–16
- Kent County League
  - Premier Division champions 2000–01, 2001–02
  - Division One (West) champions 1996–97
  - Division One (West) Challenge Cup winners 1992–93
  - West Section Senior Division champions 1987–88
  - West Section Premier Division champions 1986–87
  - West Section Division One champions 1983–84
  - West Section Division Two champions 1982–83
  - West Section Senior Division Challenge Cup winners 1987–88
- Maidstone & District League
  - Premier Division champions 1979–80, 1980–81, 1981–82
  - Division One champions 1977–78
  - Division Two champions 1974–75
  - Division Three champions 1973–74
  - Division Six champions 1961–62
- Inter Regional Challenge Cup
  - Winners 1990–91, 1993–94, 1996–97
