= Rusthall F.C. =

Association football club in England

Coordinates: 51.1386°N 0.2236°E

Rusthall FC
- Full name: Rusthall Football Club
- Nickname: The Rustics
- Founded: 1899
- Ground: The Jockey Farm Stadium, Nellington Road, Rusthall, Royal Tunbridge Wells
- Chairman: Dean Jacquin
- Manager: Jimmy Anderson
- League: Southern Counties East League Premier Division
- 2025–26: Southern Counties East League Premier Division, 3rd of 19
- Website: www.rusthallfc.com
| Home colours | Away colours |

Rusthall FC is an English football club located in Rusthall, near Royal Tunbridge Wells, in Kent. The club plays in the Southern Counties East League Premier Division. Rusthall spent most of its history in the Tunbridge Wells League before entering the Kent County Football League in 1983–84. After winning three championships at this level, the club was accepted into the newly formed Kent Invicta Football League for the inaugural 2011–12 season.

== History ==
Rusthall Football Club was formed in 1899 when they registered with the Kent County Football Association and entered the Tunbridge Wells League. They won their first silverware in 1904–05, winning the league. They won the league a further five times in the 1920s, and a further four times in the 1930s. During this time Rusthall also won four Tunbridge Wells Senior Cups. After the Second World War they won the league only once more in 1951–52 and the Senior Cup twice before entering the Kent County Football League in 1983. They won the Kent County League Division Two West in their first season, achieving promotion to Division One West, which they also won in their first season. They won the Tunbridge Wells Senior Cup a further six times before winning the West Kent Challenge Shield in 2003–04. The following season Rusthall won both Division One West and the Tunbridge Wells Senior Cup, earning promotion to the Premier Division. For the 2011–12 season the club was accepted into the Kent Invicta Football League at level 10 of the English football league system for the league's inaugural season.

Flood lights were installed in April 2016 allowing evening games to be played and play in the FA Vase.

Rusthall gained promotion to the Southern Counties East Football League Premier Division as Division One runners-up during the 2016–17 season. They also competed in their first ever FA Cup game against CB Hounslow United in the extra preliminary round of the 2017–18 FA Cup. The club won the 2025–26 edition of the SCEFL Challenge Cup.

== Colours ==
Rusthall's colours are green and white striped shirts, with green shorts and socks. The away kit is red and white striped shirts, with red shorts and socks.

== Grounds ==
Rusthall play their home games at The Jockey Farm Stadium, Nellington Road, Rusthall, Tunbridge Wells, Kent, TN4 8SH. Before the 1980s the club played at Southwood Road, but moved to Jockey Farm in order to meet ground grading criteria.

== Management team/staff ==
- Chairman - Dean Jacquin
- Vice Chairman - Jamie Poole
- Manager - Jimmy Anderson
- Secretary - Dean Jacquin
- Treasurer - Joe Croker
- Media - Jamie Poole
- Commercial Manager - Martin Millins
- Welfare Officer - Jackie Martin
- Clubhouse Manager - Pauline Hawkins
- Facilities/Grounds - Greg Dobson
- Fixtures Secretary - Sarah Turnbull
- Kit & Equipment - Shaun Turnbull
- Matchday Announcer - Simon Howe
- Committee Member - Colin Smithers
- Committee Member - Alan Hawkins

== Honours ==
Rusthall has won three league championships and one cup in its time in the Kent County League, and eleven league championships and thirteen cups at the Tunbridge Wells level.

- Southern Counties East Football League
  - Division One runners-up: 2016–17
  - Challenge Cup champions: 2025–26
- Kent County League
  - Division One West champions: 1984–85, 2004–05
  - Division Two West champions: 1983–84
  - West Challenge Cup runners-up: 1987–88
  - West Kent Challenge Shield: Winners 2003–04
- Tunbridge Wells League
  - Champions (11): 1904–05, 1922–23, 1923–24, 1924–25, 1925–26, 1929–30, 1930–31, 1934–35, 1937–38, 1938–39, 1951–52
  - Senior Cup champions (13): 1929–30, 1930–31, 1934–35, 1937–38, 1954–55, 1959–60, 1992–93, 1993–94, 1994–95, 2000–01, 2002–03, 2003–04, 2004–05

== Records ==
- FA Vase best performance: Third Round 2026–27
