= Sporting Club Thamesmead F.C. =

Association football club in England

Sporting Club Thamesmead
- Full name: Sporting Club Thamesmead Football Club
- Nickname: The Acre
- Founded: 1900
- Ground: Bayliss Avenue, Thamesmead
- Capacity: 800
- Owner: Lee Hill
- Chairman: Lee Hill & Sam Taylor
- Manager: Ben Williams & Craig Penfold
- Coach: Uche Ibewere, Neev Sampat & Lewis Vandercom
- League: Southern Counties East League Division One
- 2025–26: Southern Counties East League Division One, 10th of 18
Home colours	Away colours

Sporting Club Thamesmead F.C. is an English football club located in Thamesmead in the London Borough of Bexley currently managed by Ben Williams and Craig Penfold, assisted by Uche Ibewere and Neev Sampat. The club is affiliated to the Kent Football Association. The first team plays in the Southern Counties East League Division One, the reserves in the Kent County League and the veterans team in the Southern Vets League.

Formed in 1900 as Royal Ordnance Factories Sports Association (ROFSA), in 1966 they changed their name to Royal Arsenal Sports and Recreation Association (RASRA). From 2003 until 2011, the team was known as Seven Acre Sports, before being renamed as Seven Acre & Sidcup on moving to Oxford Road in Sidcup. The club's current name was adopted in 2016, following a further move to the new Sporting Club Thamesmead sports complex in 2014.

== History ==
Formed in 1900 the club played in several south London leagues, the London Spartan League and the Spartan League before joining the South London Alliance. During its time there the club often moved between its Premier Division and First Division. After numerous cup wins over the years, and following winning the Division One title at the end of the 2008–09 campaign, Seven Acres refused promotion to the Premier Division and joined the Kent County League in Division Two West.

In 2010 the Acre moved from their traditional home of Abbey Wood to Sidcup, changing their name to Seven Acre & Sidcup, and in 2011–12 was accepted to become one of the founder members of the Kent Invicta Football League at level 10 of the English football league system for its inaugural season.

In its penultimate season in Sidcup, the Beckenham Hospitals Cup won in Chislehurst against Tudor Sports.

For the 2014–15 season, the club began a groundshare with Thamesmead Town F.C. at Bayliss Avenue. This cemented their position in the Kent Invicta League and saw the club enter the FA Vase that season, and the FA Cup the following season.

Another name change occurred in during the 2016–17 season, seeing them become Sporting Club Thamesmead F.C.

In 2018, Sporting Club Thamesmead claimed their first silverware as the Hospitals Charity Cup. Defeating Phoenix Sports Reserves at Park View Road, the home ground of Welling United.

== Colours ==
SC Thamesmead's colours are black and red striped shirts, with black shorts and socks sponsored by B&W Engineering The away kit is yellow and dark blue shirts, with dark blue shorts and socks also sponsored by B&W Engineering.

== Grounds ==
1900 to 2010 the club played at the Seven Acre ground in Abbey Wood. From 2011 to 2014 the club played at Oxford Road, Sidcup. Since the 2014–15 season, the club have played all of their home games at the Sporting Club Thamesmead complex at Bayliss Avenue, Thamesmead. Originally groundsharing with Thamesmead Town F.C., this enabled the club to compete in the FA step 6 (then named) Kent Invicta League as well as FA national cups. The reserve and vets teams play on the adjacent new 4G pitch.

== (Recent) Club Honours ==
=== League honours ===
- South London Football Alliance Division One:
  - Champions (1): 2008–09
- Kent County League Division Two West: Champions – 2019–20
- WESFA Premier Division: Champions – 2019–20

=== Cup honours ===
- South London Football Alliance Queen Mary Charity Cup: winners 2007, 2008
  - Runners Up (1): 2008–09
- Beckenham Hospitals Cup: winners – 2013
- Erith Hospitals Charity Cup: winners – 2007, 2013, 2018
- London Junior FA Sunday Cup: winners – 2013
- NKSFL Bob Snow Cup: winners – 2012

== Records ==
- FA Cup
  - Preliminary Round 2015–16
- FA Vase
  - Second round proper 2016–17 season
- Highest league position: 5th in Kent Invicta Football League 2012–13
