= Kent Football United F.C. =

Association football club in England

Coordinates: 51.439721°N 0.21792680°E

Kent Football United
- Full name: Kent Football United Football Club
- Founded: 2010
- Dissolved: 2022
- Ground: Glentworth Sports Club, Dartford
Home colours	Away colours

The old Erith & Dartford Town club badge.

Kent Football United Football Club was a semi-professional football club based in Dartford, Kent, England. They play at the Glentworth Sports Club.

== History ==
The club was established as Dartford Town in 1999 by Roy MacNeil. They later joined the South London Alliance, winning Division Four in 2009–10. In 2010 the club merged with Erith Town to form Erith & Dartford Town. Although Erith Town pulled out of the merger shortly afterwards, Dartford continued under the new name. They were founder members of the Kent Invicta League in 2011, finishing thirteenth out of sixteen clubs in its first season. At the end of the season they merged with the Kent Football United youth football club formed by Roy MacNeil's son Sam in 2010, adopting the youth club's name. In 2016 the Kent Invicta League merged into the Southern Counties East League, becoming its Division One. In August 2022 they withdrew from the league.

== Ground ==
The club initially played at the Glentworth Sports Club in Central Park. After joining the Kent Invicta League, they groundshared at VCD Athletic's Oakwood ground, before returning to the Glentworth Sports Club in 2014. Floodlights and a seated stand were installed in 2018, with the seats coming from the London Aquatics Centre.

== Records ==
- Best FA Vase performance: Second qualifying round, 2011–12
- Record attendance: 208 vs Glebe, Southern Counties East League Division One, 8 October 2016

== Honours ==
- South London Football Alliance
  - Division Four champions 2009–10

== See also ==
- Kent Football United F.C. players
