= Lydd Town F.C. =

Association football club in England

Coordinates: 50.9444°N 0.9087°E

Lydd Town
- Full name: Lydd Town Football Club
- Nickname: The Lydders
- Founded: 1885
- Ground: The Lindsey Field, Lydd
- Chairman: Scott Lindsey
- Manager: Dexter Gondongwe
- League: Southern Counties East League Division One
- 2025–26: Southern Counties East League Division One, 16th of 18
Home colours	Away colours

Lydd Town Football Club is a semi-professional football club based in Lydd, Kent, England. They are currently members of the Southern Counties East League Division One and play at the Lindsey Field.

== History ==
The club was established in 1885. Prior to World War I they played in the South Eastern (Ashford) League, winning the Rye Charity Cup in 1909–10 with a 2–0 win over Icklesham in the final. After winning a league and cup double in 1958–59, the club moved up to the Kent County League, joining the South Division of the Eastern Section.

In 1964–65 Lydd were Division One runners-up. After being promoted to the Premier Division, they won the Eastern Section League Cup in 1965–66. In 1969–70 the club won the Premier Division title and went on to retain it the following season. They were Premier Division runners-up in 1971–72, also winning the League Cup, and Premier Division runners-up again in 1979–80. Despite finishing fourth in the Premier Division in 1983–84, the club were not included in the new top-level Senior Division created the following season, instead remaining in the (now second-level) Premier Division. However, they went on to win the Premier Division without losing a match and were promoted to the Senior Division at the first attempt, also winning the Premier Cup.

Lydd were Senior Division runners-up in 1987–88 and again in 1988–89 before winning the division three times in succession from 1989–90 to 1991–92. In 1992 the Eastern and Western sections of the league were merged; despite being reigning champions of the Eastern Section, Lydd were placed in Division One East, which they won at the first attempt, losing only once in the league all season; they also won the Les Leckie Cup and the Eastern Floodlit Cup. Denied promotion, the club won the division again in 1993–94 without losing a match and were promoted to the Premier Division; they also retained both cups and went on to win the Floodlit Cup for a third consecutive time the following season.

The 1995–96 season saw Lydd finish as runners-up in the Premier Division. They won the Les Leckie Cup again in 2002–03, but finished bottom of the Premier Division in 2005–06 and were relegated to Division One. In 2008–09 the club finished last in Division One East and were relegated to Division Two East. They were Division Two East runners-up in 2010–11 and became founder members of the new Kent Invicta League the following season. In 2013–14 they were Kent Invicta League runners-up. In 2016 the league merged into the Southern Counties East League, becoming its Division One.

In 2022–23 Lydd finished third in Division One, qualifying for the promotion playoffs. After defeating Faversham Strike Force 4–2 in the semi-finals, they won the final against Tooting Bec 5–4 on penalties after a 1–1 draw, earning promotion to the Premier Division. The 2024–25 season saw the club finish second-from-bottom of the Premier Division following a four-point deduction for fielding an ineligible player, resulting in relegation to Division One.

== Grounds ==
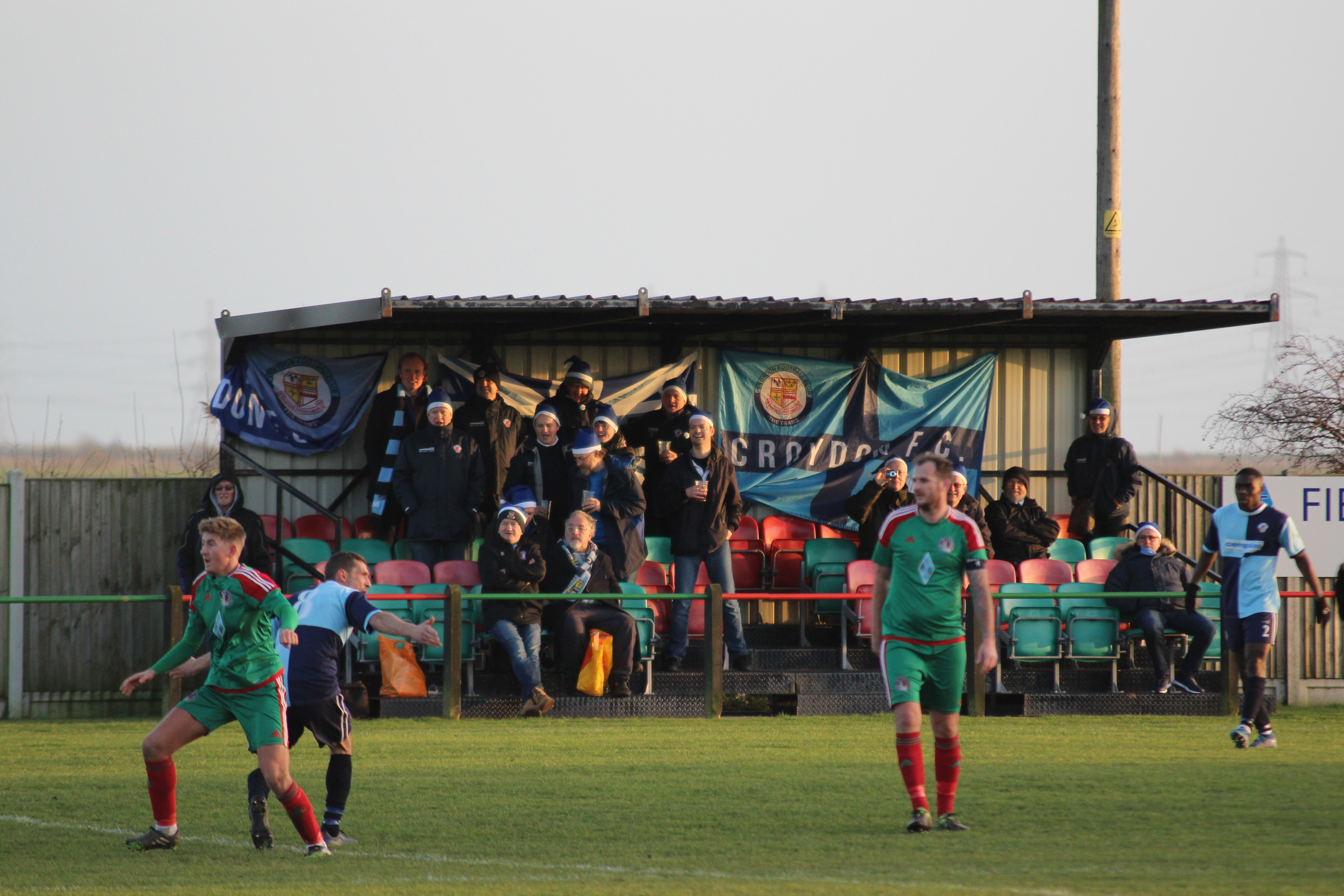
Lydd (in green) playing Croydon

The club originally played on a ground now used for cricket. They moved to the council-owned Rype ground in 1911, where they played until relocating to the Lindsey Field in 1999. Opened by George Cohen, the new ground was funded by a grant from the National Lottery and was named after the club's longest-serving player and later manager and chairman Pat Lindsey.

== Honours ==
- Kent County League
  - Eastern Section Senior Division champions 1989–90, 1990–91, 1991–92
  - Eastern Section Premier Division champions 1969–70, 1970–71
  - Division One East champions 1992–93, 1993–94
  - Eastern Section Premier Division Challenge Cup winners 1984–85
  - Les Leckie Cup winners 1987–88, 1988–89, 1989–90, 1991–92, 1992–93, 1993–94, 2002–03
  - Eastern Floodlight Cup winners 1992–93, 1993–94, 1994–95
- Rye Charity Cup
  - Winners 1909–10

== Records ==
- Best FA Cup performance: First qualifying round, 2023–24
- Best FA Vase performance: Second round, 2024–25

== See also ==
- Lydd Town F.C. players
