= Bridon Ropes F.C. =

Association football club in England

Coordinates: 51.4786°N 0.0476°E

Bridon Ropes
- Full name: Bridon Ropes Football Club
- Nickname: The Ropes
- Founded: 1935
- Ground: Meridian Sports & Social Club, Charlton
- Chairman: Mick Puszyk
- Manager: Vacant
- League: Southern Counties East League Division One
- 2025–26: Southern Counties East League Division One, 12th of 18
- Website: https://www.bridonropesfc.com/
Home colours	Away colours

Bridon Ropes Football Club is a football club based in Charlton, Royal Borough of Greenwich, England. They are currently members of the Southern Counties East League Division One and play at Meridian Sports & Social Club.

== History ==
The club was established in 1935 as a works team of the British Ropes factory in Charlton. The club initially played in local leagues, before becoming members of the South London Amateur League. In 1970 the club joined Division Two of the Greater London League, which was largely composed of reserve teams. However, the league was disbanded at the end of the 1970–71 season when it merged into the Metropolitan–London League.

In 1975 they joined the Intermediate Division of the London Spartan League. In 1990 the club was renamed Bridon Sports after the company was renamed Bridon Ropes. The division was renamed Division Two in 1991, and the following year the club changed name again, this time becoming Bridon Ropes. They went on to win the Division Two title and the Kent Junior Cup in 1992–93, earning promotion to Division One. In 1997 the Spartan League merged with the South Midlands League to form the Spartan South Midlands League, with Bridon placed in Division One South. However, after one season they left the league to become founder members of the London Intermediate League. The club subsequently won the League Cup in 1999–2000 and 2000–01.

In 2003 Bridon joined Division Two West of the Kent County League. After finishing as runners-up in 2005–06, they were promoted to Division One West. They went on to win the division in 2009–10 and were promoted to the Premier Division. In 2011 they were founder members of the Kent Invicta League. In 2013–14 the club won the London Senior Trophy, beating Corinthian-Casuals 2–1 in the final, after extra time. In 2016 the Kent Invicta League became Division One of the Southern Counties East League when the two leagues merged.

== Ground ==
Bridon Ropes play their home games at Meridian Sports & Social Club on Charlton Park Lane.

== Club officials ==
Position	Name
Chairman	Mick Puszyk
Secretary	Stuart Biggs
Commercial and Fundraising	Louise Dunsdon
Head of Player Care	Stuart Biggs
First Team Manager	Lee Roots
Assistant Manager	Adam Groom
Player Coach	Rhonan Dunphy
Analyst & Conditioning Coach	Harry Towner
GK Coach	Rob Stockburn
Kitman	Brian White
Club Captain	Rhonan Dunphy
Reserve Team Manager	Charley Trott
Reserve Team Assistant	Stuart Goyns
Clubhouse & Event Bookings	Steve Killick
Club Groundsman	Tony Provan
Head Of Social Media	Summer Lopez

== Honours ==
- Spartan League
  - Division Two champions 1991–92
- Kent County League
  - Division One West champions 2009–10
- London Intermediate League
  - League Cup winners 1999–2000, 2000–01
- London Senior Trophy
  - Winners 2013–14
- Kent Junior Cup
  - Winners 1992–93

== Records ==
- Best FA Cup performance: Preliminary round, 2019–20
- Best FA Vase performance: First round, 2015–16, 2016–17
