= Meridian VP F.C. =

Association football club in England

Coordinates: 51.478587°N 0.047646°E

Meridian VP
- Full name: Meridian VP Football Club
- Founded: 1995
- Ground: Meridian Sports & Social Club, Charlton
- Chairman: Dwinder Tamna
- Manager: Owen Jones
- League: Kent County League Premier Division
- 2024–25: Southern Counties East League Division One, 18th of 18 (relegated)
Home colours	Away colours

Meridian Valley Park Football Club is a football club located in Charlton, in the Royal Borough of Greenwich, London, England. Affiliated to the Kent FA, they are currently members of the Kent County League Premier Division and play at the Meridian Sports & Social Club.

== History ==
The club was founded in 1995 as Meridian S&S. They joined the Dartford & District League, finishing as runners-up in 1999–2000 and winning the League Cup in 2002–03 after losing the final in three of the four previous seasons. In 2003 they joined Division Three West of the Kent County League. The division was disbanded at the end of the 2003–04 season and the club were moved up to Division Two West. Despite finishing second-from-bottom of the division for three consecutive seasons between 2008–09 and 2010–11, they became founder members of the Kent Invicta League, moving up three levels. In 2013 the club was renamed Meridian VP, following a merger with Valley Park. In 2016 the league merged into the Southern Counties East League, becoming its Division One.

=== Other teams ===
The club also ran a veterans team. In 2012 Derek May, still playing at the age of 74, scored his 1,300th goal.

== Ground ==
Meridian play their home games at the Meridian Sports & Social Club on Charlton Park Lane in Charlton. The social club was established in 1921 by employees of Siemens who worked at the company's Woolwich factory, with staff contributing money towards its running from their weekly pay. The sports ground was bought in 1933, with the clubhouse built in 1936. The site was left derelict after the company closed the factory in 1967, but was reopened in 1977 when it was leased by Greenwich London Borough Council. Once reopened, the site hosted football, hockey, rugby and athletics. During the 1980s it was the home ground of Thamesmead.

== Honours ==
- Dartford & District League
  - League Cup winners 2002–03

== Records ==
- Best FA Vase performance: Second round, 2017–18
