= Sutton Athletic F.C. =

Association football club in England

Coordinates: 51.4143°N 0.1987°E

Sutton Athletic
- Full name: Sutton Athletic Football Club
- Founded: 1898; 128 years ago
- Ground: Lower Road, Hextable
- Chairman: Deren Ibrahim
- Manager: Russell Bedford
- League: Southern Counties East League Premier Division
- 2025–26: Southern Counties East League Premier Division, 9th of 19
| Home colours | Away colours |

Sutton Athletic F.C. is an English football club in Sutton-at-Hone, near Dartford in Kent. The club plays in the Southern Counties East League Premier Division. Sutton Athletic has been playing football at a county level in Kent since the 1960s, winning leagues and cups in the Kent County Football League system, particularly during the late 1960s and early 1970s, when they won three successive league-and-cup doubles. Sutton were accepted into the newly formed Kent Invicta Football league for the inaugural 2011–12 season. The club is affiliated to the Kent County Football Association

== History ==
Sutton Athletic Football Club was formed in 1898. They joined the Kent Amateur League in from the Dartford League in 1968. This was the beginning of three successive promotions which led Sutton, via West Division One and the West Premier Division, to the West Senior Division of the Kent County League by 1971. During its three promotions, the club also reached each division's respective challenge cup, achieving two consecutive league-and-cup doubles, and almost achieving a Third but double, but losing to Westerham in the Premier League cup final. Sutton were runners-up in the West Senior Division in 1975–76 and followed this up with another double in 1976–77, winning the league and the West Senior Division Challenge Cup. The team was relegated within the next few years but finished runners-up in the West Premier Division in 1982–83. However, the club were then relegated again and due to league restructuring ended up in West Division Two again, from which they were promoted after winning the league in 1993–94. After being relegated to the East Division Two they won the Les Leckie Cup in 2005–06 and were promoted again after finishing runners-up in the West Division Two a year later. They were promoted from West Division One as runners-up in 2008–09. In 2010–11, they won the Inter Regional Challenge Cup. For the 2011–12 season, the club was accepted into the Kent Invicta Football League at level 10 of the English football league system for its inaugural season. The club was promoted to the SCEFL Premier Division in the 2021–22 season, beating Larkfield & New Hythe Wanderers in the First Division Play-Off Final having finished second in the regular season.

== Colours ==
Sutton Athletic's colours are green and white striped shirts, with green shorts and socks. The away kit is red shirts, black shorts and red socks.

== Ground ==
Sutton Athletic play their games at Lower Road, Hextable, BR8 7RZ.

== Honours ==
=== League honours ===
- SCEFL Division One
  - Play-off Winners (1): 2021–22
- Kent County League West Senior Division
  - Champions (1): 1976–77
  - Runners-up (1): 1975–76
- Kent County League West Premier Division
  - Champions (1): 1970–71
  - Runners-up (1): 1982–83
- Kent County League West Division One
  - Champions (1): 1969–70
  - Runners-up (1): 2008–09
- Kent County League West Division Two
  - Champions (2): 1968–69, 1993–94
- Kent County League East Division Two
  - Runners-up (1): 2006–07
- Dartford League
  - Champions (11): 1952–53, 1953–54, 1954–55, 1956–57, 1958–59, 1959–60, 1960–61, 1961–62, 1962–63, 1963–64, 1964–65
  - Runners-up (1): 1955–56
  - Worst player award: James Smith. He was benched when the team only had 11 men and they played with 10!

=== Cup honours ===
- Kent Senior Trophy
  - Winners (1): 1974–75
- Inter Regional Challenge Cup
  - Winners (1): 2010–11
- Erith Hospital Charity Cup
  - Winners (11): 1954–55, 1955–56, 1956–57, 1961–62, 1968–69, 1970–71, 1995–96, 1997–98, 2006–07, 2008–09, 2010–11
  - Runners-up (1): 2007–08
- Mallinson Hospital Cup
  - Winners (1): 1950–51
  - Runners-up (2):1953–54, 1976–77
- Les Leckie Cup
  - Runners-up (1): 2005–06
- Kent County League West Senior Division Challenge Cup
  - Winners (1): 1976–77
- Kent County League West Premier Division League Cup
  - Runners-up (1): 1970–71
- Kent County League West Division One Challenge Cup
  - Winners (1): 1969–70
- Kent County League West Junior Challenge Cup
  - Winners (1): 1993–94
- Kent County League West Division Two Challenge Cup
  - Winners (1): 1968–69
- Dartford League Cup
  - Winners (7): 1953–54, 1954–55, 1955–56, 1960–61, 1962–63, 1963–64, 1964–65
  - Runners-up (3): 1950–51, 1951–52, 1958–59

== Records ==
- Highest league position: 3rd in Kent Invicta League 2013–14
