= 2026–27 Southern Counties East Football League =

The 2026–27 Southern Counties East Football League season is the 61st in the history of the Southern Counties East Football League, a football competition in South East England.

The league comprises two divisions: the Premier Division (at level 9 of the English football league system, Step 5 National League System) and the First Division at level 10 or Step 6. Additionally, there are two cup competitions: the League Challenge Cup, a knockout competition open to all the league's clubs; and the Division One Cup, a knockout competition for First Division clubs only.

== Premier Division ==
Southern Counties East Football League Premier Division
- Season: 2026–27
- Teams: 18

Four clubs had left the division after the previous season:

- Hythe Town, relegated to Division One
- Punjab United, promoted as promotion play-off winners to the Isthmian League South East Division
- Stansfeld, relegated to Division One
- Whitstable Town, promoted as champions to the Isthmian League South East Division

The 2026–27 Premier Division club allocations from the FA Leagues Committee (subject to appeal) were announced on 15 May 2026, and the constitution of the division was adopted at the league's AGM on 25 June 2026. The division comprises 18 clubs, 15 remaining from the previous season plus 3 additions:

- AFC Greenwich Borough, promoted as champions of the First Division
- Beckenham Town, relegated from the Isthmian League South East Division
- SE Dons, promoted as promotion play-off winners of the First Division

Holmesdale were renamed Petts Wood & Holmesdale following their merger with local amateur club Petts Wood.

=== League table ===
Pos	Team	Pld	W	D	L	GF	GA	GD	Pts	Promotion, qualification or relegation
1	Fisher	14	9	3	2	43	24	+19	30	Promotion to the Isthmian League
2	Hollands & Blair	13	8	2	3	23	13	+10	26	Qualification for the promotion play-offs
3	Petts Wood & Holmesdale	14	8	2	4	37	30	+7	26	Qualification for the promotion play-offs
4	AFC Greenwich Borough	12	8	2	2	24	18	+6	26	Qualification for the promotion play-offs
5	Bearsted	13	7	2	4	29	22	+7	23	Qualification for the promotion play-offs
6	Phoenix Sports	14	7	1	6	33	23	+10	22	
7	Larkfield & New Hythe Wanderers	15	6	3	6	22	28	−6	21	
8	Kennington	12	6	2	4	28	18	+10	20	
9	Sutton Athletic	13	6	1	6	33	26	+7	19	
10	Chislehurst Glebe	14	6	1	7	25	31	−6	19	
11	Snodland Town	13	4	6	3	23	16	+7	18	
12	Faversham Strike Force	15	5	3	7	27	28	−1	18	
13	Rusthall	13	6	0	7	25	29	−4	18	
14	SE Dons	10	5	1	4	30	20	+10	16	
15	Corinthian	12	4	4	4	23	23	0	16	
16	Tunbridge Wells	14	2	3	9	25	39	−14	9	
17	Beckenham Town	15	2	2	11	10	38	−28	8	Relegation to Division One
18	Erith & Belvedere	14	2	0	12	16	50	−34	6	Relegation to Division One

Updated to match(es) played on 21 November 2026. Source: The FA Full-Time; Tables: Season 2026/27 SCEFL Premier Division Table
Rules for classification: 1) points; 2) goal difference; 3) number of goals scored; 4) number of matches won; 5) head-to-head results

=== Results table ===
Home \ Away	AGR	BEA	BEC	CHG	COR	E&B	FAV	FIS	H&B	KEN	LAR	PET	PHO	RUS	SED	SNO	SUT	TUN
AFC Greenwich B.									3–2				3–2	3–2				
Bearsted	1–0			2–0	4–1		3–0		1–2			1–3				2–2		2–1
Beckenham Town	1–1			2–0	0–3	0–1			1–0		1–1	1–5			0–5		2–3	
Chislehurst Glebe	2–0				3–0	5–1		2–2				3–2				2–0	5–4	
Corinthian		1–1				5–2						5–2	1–5	2–0				
Erith & Belvedere	1–2						0–4	1–3			2–3		2–3		1–7		2–4	
Faversham S. F.	1–3			3–0					1–2		0–1		1–0	0–2		2–2		
Fisher		5–4	3–1		2–2		4–3					6–3	6–2					5–0
Hollands & Blair				4–0		1–2					2–0		1–0		2–1			2–0
Kennington		2–0	2–0	2–1		8–1	1–2								2–2			3–1
Larkfield & N. H. W.				3–2			2–2	2–1		1–4		2–3			0–3	0–3		3–1
Petts Wood & Holm.	3–4					1–0			1–1		1–1					3–1	5–2	2–1
Phoenix Sports	1–1		5–0							3–0	1–0	2–3		3–0			1–4	
Rusthall		4–6	3–1			4–0	2–3	2–1		3–1						0–7		
SE Dons	2–3						3–2	1–3						1–3				
Snodland Town	0–1				1–0			0–0	3–3	2–2				1–0				
Sutton Athletic		1–2	5–0		0–0			1–2	0–1	2–1	2–3							5–2
Tunbridge Wells			1–0	6–0	3–3		3–3						1–5		4–5	1–1		

Updated to match(es) played on 21 November 2026. Source: The FA Full-Time
Legend: Blue = home team win; Yellow = draw; Red = away team win.

=== Stadia and locations ===
2026–27 Premier Division: Location of clubs (Greater London)
2026–27 Premier Division: Location of clubs (Kent)

Club	Location	Stadium	Capacity
AFC Greenwich Borough	Eltham	GB10 Sports	
Bearsted	Otham	Otham Sports Ground	1,000
Beckenham Town	Beckenham	Eden Park Avenue	4,000
Chislehurst Glebe	Chislehurst	Foxbury Avenue	1,200
Corinthian	Longfield	Gay Dawn Farm	2,000
Erith & Belvedere	Welling	Acclaim Handling Community Stadium (groundshare with Welling United)	4,000
Faversham Strike Force	Whitstable	The YMS Stadium (groundshare with Whitstable Town)	3,000
Fisher	Rotherhithe	St Paul's Sports Ground	2,500
Hollands & Blair	Gillingham	Star Meadow	1,000
Petts Wood & Holmesdale	Bromley	Oakley Road	
Kennington	Kingsnorth	Greenbox Stadium (groundshare with Ashford United)	3,200
Larkfield & New Hythe Wanderers	Larkfield	Eden Estates Stadium	3,000
Phoenix Sports	Barnehurst	The Christopher Russell Stadium	2,000
Rusthall	Rusthall	The Jockey Farm Stadium	1,500
SE Dons	Crayford	The Oakwood	5,000
Snodland Town	Snodland	G I Landscape Stadium	1,000
Sutton Athletic	Hextable	Capital Roofing Community Stadium	
Tunbridge Wells	Royal Tunbridge Wells	Culverden Stadium	3,750

source: SCEFL Club Directory 2026–27: Premier Division

== First Division ==
Southern Counties East Football League First Division
- Season: 2026–27
- Teams: 18

Three clubs had left the division after the previous season:

- AFC Greenwich Borough, promoted as champions to the Premier Division
- Chessington & Hook United, relegated to the Surrey Premier League
- SE Dons, promoted as promotion play-off winners to the Premier Division

The 2026–27 First Division club allocations from the FA Leagues Committee (subject to appeal) were announced on 15 May 2026, and the constitution of the division was adopted at the league's AGM on 25 June 2026. The division comprises 18 clubs, 15 remaining from the previous season plus 3 additions:

- Hythe Town, relegated from the Premier Division
- Minster, promoted as runners-up from the Kent County League Premier Division
- Stansfeld, relegated from the Premier Division

=== League table ===
Pos	Team	Pld	W	D	L	GF	GA	GD	Pts	Promotion, qualification or relegation
1	Rochester United	15	11	1	3	27	18	+9	34	Promotion to the Premier Division
2	Stansfeld	15	9	3	3	27	12	+15	30	Qualification for the promotion play-offs
3	Lordswood	15	9	2	4	38	19	+19	29	Qualification for the promotion play-offs
4	Minster	15	7	4	4	20	18	+2	25	Qualification for the promotion play-offs
5	Lewisham Borough	15	7	2	6	25	18	+7	23	Qualification for the promotion play-offs
6	Croydon	15	6	4	5	32	18	+14	22	
7	Hythe Town	10	7	1	2	27	17	+10	22	
8	Sheppey Sports	12	6	3	3	23	16	+7	21	
9	Sporting Club Thamesmead	12	6	2	4	27	17	+10	20	
10	Staplehurst Monarchs	12	5	4	3	16	16	0	19	
11	FC Elmstead	15	5	3	7	23	27	−4	18	
12	Greenways	15	4	4	7	15	18	−3	16	
13	Bridon Ropes	15	4	3	8	28	38	−10	15	
14	Tooting Bec	13	3	3	7	16	25	−9	12	
15	Banstead Athletic	14	3	1	10	12	22	−10	10	
16	Welling Town	11	2	4	5	9	22	−13	10	Relegation to feeder leagues
17	Lydd Town	14	2	4	8	13	36	−23	10	Relegation to feeder leagues
18	Halls Athletic	13	2	2	9	12	33	−21	8	Relegation to feeder leagues

Updated to match(es) played on 21 November 2026. Source: The FA Full-Time; Tables: Season 2026/27 SCEFL First Division Table
Rules for classification: 1) points; 2) goal difference; 3) number of goals scored; 4) number of matches won; 5) head-to-head results

=== Results table ===
Home \ Away	BAN	BRI	CRO	ELM	GWY	HAL	HYT	LEW	LOR	LYD	MIN	ROC	SCT	SHE	STN	STP	TOO	WEL
Banstead Athletic					3–1			0–1		1–1				0–1	0–1	1–0	0–1	0–2
Bridon Ropes	3–1						1–4	1–2		1–0	0–3		2–5			1–3	6–2	1–1
Croydon				2–0			2–3	1–1		6–0	0–0	2–0		1–1		1–2	3–0	
FC Elmstead	2–1	3–3			2–0		1–0			1–2		2–0	1–5			2–3		
Greenways		3–3	1–1				0–1	1–0					2–2		1–2	0–0		
Halls Athletic	2–4	3–2		1–1	1–2		0–1				0–1		1–0		0–4			
Hythe Town														3–5				
Lewisham Borough				4–2		4–1	2–3		0–1	3–0		5–1					0–3	
Lordswood	3–0	3–0	2–1			6–1	3–7			6–0					2–0			7–1
Lydd Town			2–1				1–3				1–1	2–3	0–3					2–2
Minster	2–1		1–4		0–1			1–1	3–2			1–2			1–1		1–0	1–0
Rochester United	2–0			2–1	1–0	3–1			0–0					1–0			3–1	3–0
S. C. Thamesmead			1–6		1–0				0–1		1–4				0–0			
Sheppey Sports		3–1		3–3	1–0	1–1		0–2			4–0						3–0	
Stansfeld			4–1	0–2				2–0	2–0	4–1		1–2		4–1				2–1
Staplehurst M.							2–2	1–0	3–1			2–4	0–4		0–0			
Tooting Bec		2–3			0–3	4–0			1–1	1–1								
Welling Town				1–0									0–5			0–0	1–1	

Updated to match(es) played on 21 November 2026. Source: The FA Full-Time
Legend: Blue = home team win; Yellow = draw; Red = away team win.

=== Stadia and locations ===
2026–27 First Division: Location of clubs (Greater London)
2026–27 First Division: Location of clubs (Kent)

Club	Location	Stadium	Capacity
Banstead Athletic	Tadworth	Merland Rise	1,500
Bridon Ropes	Charlton	Meridian Sports & Social Club	
Croydon	Croydon	Croydon Arena	8,000
FC Elmstead	Tonbridge	Yeomans Community Stadium Lower Road (groundshare with Tonbridge Angels)	
Greenways	Strood	Rochester Utilities Stadium (groundshare with Rochester United)	1,000
Halls Athletic	Dartford	Princes Park (groundshare with Dartford)	4,100
Hythe Town	Hythe	Reachfields Stadium	3,000
Lewisham Borough	Catford	Alex Lee Ladywell Arena	
Lordswood	Lordswoood	K G Property Stadium	600
Lydd Town	Lydd	The Lindsey Field	1,000
Minster	Margate	Hartsdown Park (groundshare with Margate)	3,000
Rochester United	Strood	Rochester Utilities Stadium	1,000
Sheppey Sports	Isle of Sheppey	Holm Park (groundshare with Sheppey United)	1,530
Sporting Club Thamesmead	Thamesmead	The Masher Brothers Community Stadium (groundshare with Erith Town)	800
Stansfeld	Eltham	The Artic Stadium (groundshare with Cray Valley Paper Mills)	1,550
Staplehurst Monarchs	Staplehurst	Jubilee Sports Ground	1,000
Tooting Bec	Tooting Bec	NRT Stadium (groundshare with Chipstead)	2,000
Welling Town	Welling	Erith Leisure Centre Community Stadium	

source: SCEFL Club Directory 2026–27: First Division

== League Challenge Cup ==
The 2026–27 SCEFL Challenge Cup was a knock-out competition contested by all 36 clubs from both the Premier and First divisions (indicated by '(PD)' and '(FD)' respectively in the results listings below).

=== First round ===
The first round was contested by eight teams over four ties with the remaining 28 teams receiving a bye to the next round.

Tie	Home team (division)	Score	Away team (division)
1	Corinthian (PD)	2–0	Welling Town (FD)
2	Lewisham Borough (FD)	0–1	Bridon Ropes (FD)
3	Lordswood (FD)	3–0	Bearsted (PD)
4	Sporting Club Thamesmead (FD)	3–1	Tunbridge Wells (PD)

=== Second round ===
The second round comprised sixteen ties featuring the 32 teams remaining in the competition.

Tie	Home team (division)	Score	Away team (division)
1	AFC Greenwich Borough (PD)	1–0	Phoenix Sports (PD)
2	Banstead Athletic (FD)	1–0	Petts Wood & Holmesdale (PD)
3	Chislehurst Glebe (PD)	5–1	Stansfeld (FD)
4	Corinthian (PD)	2–4	Rusthall (PD)
5	Erith & Belvedere (PD)	1–3	Bridon Ropes (FD)
6	Faversham Strike Force (PD)	3–4	Hythe Town (FD)
7	Fisher (PD)	4–1	Beckenham Town (PD)
8	Halls Athletic (FD)	2–3	Snodland Town (PD)
9	Hollands & Blair (PD)	2–1	Staplehurst Monarchs (FD)
10	Kennington (PD)	4–0	Sheppey Sports (FD)
11	Larkfield & New Hythe Wanderers (PD)	1–0	Greenways (FD)
12	Lordswood (FD)	2–2 (5–6 p)	Rochester United (FD)
13	Lydd Town (FD)	0–1	Minster (FD)
14	SE Dons (PD)	2–3	Sutton Athletic (PD)
15	Sporting Club Thamesmead (FD)	1–2	FC Elmstead (FD)
16	Tooting Bec (FD)	1–2	Croydon (FD)

=== Third round ===
The third round comprised eight ties featuring nine clubs from the Premier and seven from the First Divisions.

Tie	Home team (division)	Score	Away team (division)
1	Bridon Ropes (FD)	v	Larkfield & New Hythe Wanderers (PD)
2	Chislehurst Glebe (PD)	v	FC Elmstead (FD)
3	Croydon (FD)	v	Banstead Athletic (FD)
4	Fisher (PD)	v	Sutton Athletic (PD)
5	Minster (FD)	v	Hollands & Blair (PD)
6	Rochester United (FD)	v	Hythe Town (FD)
7	Rusthall (PD)	v	AFC Greenwich Borough (PD)
8	Snodland Town (PD)	v	Kennington (PD)

Updated to match(es) played on 4 November 2026

source: "SCEFL Challenge Cup: 2026/27". SCEFL.

== Division One Cup ==
The 2026–27 SCEFL Division One Cup is a supplementary knock-out competition contested by the eighteen First Division clubs.

=== First round ===
Four clubs were drawn into two first round ties, with byes for the other 14 clubs

Tie	Home team	Score	Away team
1	Rochester United	2–0	Sheppey Sports
2	Tooting Bec	1–0	Welling Town

=== Second round ===
The remaining sixteen clubs were drawn into eight second round ties

Tie	Home team	Score	Away team
1	Croydon	v	Sporting Club Thamesmead
2	Greenways	v	Lordswood
3	Halls Athletic	v	Staplehurst Monarchs
4	Hythe Town	v	Lydd Town
5	Lewisham Borough	v	FC Elmstead
6	Rochester United	v	Minster
7	Stansfeld	v	Banstead Athletic
8	Tooting Bec	v	Bridon Ropes

Updated to match(es) played on 18 November 2026

source: "SCEFL Division One Cup: 2026/27". SCEFL.
