= 2021–22 Southern Counties East Football League =

56th season of the Southern Counties East Football League

The 2021–22 Southern Counties East Football League season was the 56th in the history of the Southern Counties East Football League, a football competition in England, and the sixth year the competition had two divisions, the Premier Division and Division One, at Steps 5 and 6 respectively in the English football league system.

The league constitution for this season was based on allocations for Steps 5 and 6 that were announced by The Football Association on 18 May 2021, and were subject to appeal. The allocations were confirmed on 19 June at the league's annual general meeting, conducted remotely.

After the abandonment of the 2019–20 and 2020–21 seasons due to the COVID-19 pandemic in England, numerous promotions were decided on a points per game basis over the previous two seasons.

== Premier Division ==
Southern Counties East Football League Premier Division
- Season: 2021–22
- Champions: Sheppey United
- Promoted: Sheppey United; Chatham Town
- Relegated: Tower Hamlets

The Premier Division comprised 17 clubs from the previous season after its competition was abandoned, along with three new clubs, all promoted from Division One:

- Holmesdale
- Kennington
- Rusthall

=== Premier Division table ===
Pos	Team	Pld	W	D	L	GF	GA	GD	Pts	Promotion, qualification or relegation
1	Sheppey United (C, P)	38	33	3	2	104	25	+79	102	Promotion to the Isthmian League
2	Chatham Town (P)	38	32	4	2	122	20	+102	100	Promotion to the Isthmian League
3	Glebe	38	24	9	5	92	34	+58	81	
4	Deal Town	38	23	5	10	79	46	+33	74	
5	Kennington	38	21	7	10	78	61	+17	70	
6	Erith & Belvedere	38	19	7	12	80	71	+9	64	
7	Erith Town	38	19	5	14	68	56	+12	62	
8	Tunbridge Wells	38	17	6	15	82	61	+21	57	
9	Crowborough Athletic	38	15	8	15	69	74	−5	53	Transfer to the Southern Combination League
10	Hollands & Blair	38	15	9	14	56	50	+6	54	
11	Bearsted	38	14	9	15	57	67	−10	51	
12	Holmesdale	38	14	6	18	51	54	−3	48	
13	Fisher	38	11	12	15	62	60	+2	45	
14	Punjab United	38	11	8	19	58	76	−18	41	
15	Welling Town	38	12	7	19	55	81	−26	43	
16	Canterbury City	38	9	10	19	43	81	−38	37	
17	K Sports	38	10	3	25	63	96	−33	33	
18	Rusthall	38	7	3	28	40	94	−54	24	
19	Lordswood	38	6	6	26	40	107	−67	24	Reprieve from relegation (Note: Reprieved as one of twelve clubs with the most PPG out of 16 that were second-from-bottom in Step 5.)
20	Tower Hamlets (R)	38	3	3	32	34	119	−85	12	Relegation to the Eastern Counties League

Source: FA Full-Time
Rules for classification: 1) points; 2) goal difference; 3) number of goals scored; 4) number of matches won; 5) head-to-head results
(C) Champions; (P) Promoted; (R) Relegated

=== Results table ===
Home \ Away	BEA	CAN	CHA	CRW	DEA	ERB	ERT	FIS	GLB	H&B	HOL	KSP	KEN	LOR	PUN	RUS	SHE	TOW	TUN	WEL
Bearsted	—	2–2	0–0	2–2	2–2	2–2	0–3	2–2	0–5	1–2	1–0	2–1	1–1	1–2	4–2	1–0	0–2	0–0	3–2	3–0
Canterbury City	2–1	—	0–3	2–2	0–3	1–2	2–2	2–1	1–1	1–1	1–1	2–5	1–2	3–0	3–2	2–1	1–7	2–1	0–4	0–1
Chatham Town	2–1	2–0	—	4–0	7–0	10–1	3–0	2–1	2–4	2–0	3–0	3–0	3–1	7–1	3–2	2–0	2–0	4–1	5–1	4–0
Crowborough Athletic	0–0	4–1	0–2	—	0–3	1–4	0–1	1–1	1–1	4–2	1–1	2–1	1–0	5–0	0–3	4–1	1–2	5–0	3–2	2–2
Deal Town	5–2	3–0	0–0	3–0	—	2–1	1–2	4–1	3–0	1–2	2–1	3–0	2–0	3–0	2–2	2–1	0–1	3–1	0–3	3–0
Erith & Belvedere	2–1	3–1	0–1	2–2	1–0	—	2–3	1–1	3–5	3–1	2–1	3–1	0–2	4–1	2–0	2–0	0–3	2–3	1–2	3–2
Erith Town	0–0	4–0	1–2	2–3	2–2	0–2	—	3–1	2–1	3–0	1–0	1–1	1–2	4–1	1–2	4–2	0–2	3–1	1–1	1–2
Fisher	0–4	0–1	0–1	2–0	3–0	0–2	2–0	—	2–3	3–3	2–2	6–2	3–3	1–2	1–0	5–0	2–2	2–0	1–4	2–2
Glebe	3–0	4–0	0–0	1–2	1–1	3–1	4–0	3–0	—	1–0	0–1	2–0	1–1	3–0	3–2	5–1	2–0	4–0	2–0	1–1
Hollands & Blair	0–3	1–1	0–1	4–1	0–2	2–1	0–1	0–0	1–2	—	2–0	4–0	0–0	1–1	2–1	3–0	0–1	0–3	2–2	4–1
Holmesdale	3–1	0–2	0–3	3–1	1–4	1–1	1–2	1–1	0–4	1–2	—	2–1	1–2	3–0	2–0	2–3	0–1	3–1	3–4	4–0
K Sports	2–3	1–1	0–6	5–0	0–4	2–4	2–5	2–3	0–1	0–1	1–0	—	1–2	3–2	1–6	2–3	1–5	3–2	2–2	3–4
Kennington	5–2	3–2	1–7	4–1	1–0	1–2	1–0	1–0	2–2	3–3	0–2	2–4	—	3–2	1–0	2–0	3–3	3–1	2–0	5–2
Lordswood	1–2	0–3	1–5	0–6	0–3	3–4	1–2	1–1	0–6	1–4	1–1	2–1	0–2	—	2–2	0–2	0–1	2–0	1–5	3–5
Punjab United	3–1	2–0	1–1	2–4	0–3	0–4	3–4	1–1	0–0	1–2	0–1	1–5	3–2	2–1	—	2–2	1–3	5–4	1–0	1–1
Rusthall	0–2	2–1	0–2	0–2	0–4	4–4	0–1	3–0	1–3	0–5	2–4	2–3	3–5	1–3	0–1	—	0–2	1–0	1–0	1–3
Sheppey United	3–0	1–0	3–2	6–0	7–1	4–0	3–2	1–0	3–3	3–0	1–0	2–0	2–1	4–0	3–0	4–0	—	3–0	2–0	3–0
Tower Hamlets	1–3	1–1	0–10	0–4	0–4	1–5	3–2	0–7	1–3	1–2	1–3	0–2	1–5	3–3	1–2	0–0	0–5	—	0–3	1–3
Tunbridge Wells	5–2	7–0	0–1	4–1	4–0	1–1	3–2	1–3	0–4	0–0	0–1	3–2	2–3	1–1	3–0	4–3	1–3	3–0	—	3–0
Welling Town	0–2	1–1	0–5	1–3	0–1	3–3	0–2	0–1	2–1	0–0	0–1	0–3	2–1	0–1	3–3	3–0	2–3	4–1	4–2	—

Source: FA Full-Time Grid
Legend: Blue = home team win; Yellow = draw; Red = away team win.
For upcoming matches, an "a" indicates there is an article about the rivalry between the two participants.

=== Stadia and locations ===
Locations of the Premier Division clubs (Greater London)
Locations of the Premier Division clubs (Kent)

Club	Location	Stadium	Capacity
Bearsted	Otham	Honey Lane	1,000
Canterbury City	Canterbury	Salters Lane (groundshare with Faversham Town)	2,000
Chatham Town	Chatham, Kent	The Bauvill Stadium	5,000
Crowborough Athletic	Crowborough	Crowborough Community Stadium	2,000
Deal Town	Deal	Charles Sports Ground	2,000
Erith & Belvedere	Welling	Park View Road (groundshare with Welling United)	4,000
Erith Town	Thamesmead	Erith Leisure Center	
Fisher	Rotherhithe	St Paul's Sports Ground	2,500
Glebe	Chislehurst	Foxbury Avenue	1,200
Hollands & Blair	Gillingham	Star Meadow	1,000
Holmesdale	Bromley	Oakley Road	
K Sports	Aylesford	K Sports Cobdown	
Kennington	Kennington	The Homelands (groundshare with Ashford United)	3,200
Lordswood	Lordswoood	Martyn Grove	600
Punjab United	Gravesend	Elite Venue	600
Rusthall	Rusthall	The Jockey Farm Stadium	1,500
Sheppey United	Isle of Sheppey	Holm Park	1,900
Tower Hamlets	London Borough of Tower Hamlets	Phoenix Sports Ground (groundshare with Phoenix Sports)	2,000
Tunbridge Wells	Royal Tunbridge Wells	Culverden Stadium	3,750
Welling Town	Welling	EFES Stadium (groundshare with Kent Football United)	

== Division One ==
Southern Counties East Football League Division One
- Season: 2021–22
- Champions: Stansfeld
- Promoted: Stansfeld; Sutton Athletic
- Relegated: Chessington & Hook United

Division One comprised the 14 teams which competed when the previous season's competition was aborted, along with six new clubs:

- Promoted from the Kent County League
  - Faversham Strike Force
  - Larkfield & New Hythe Wanderers
  - Staplehurst Monarchs
- Transferred from the Combined Counties League
  - Chessington & Hook United
  - Tooting Bec
  - Westside

=== Division One table ===
Pos	Team	Pld	W	D	L	GF	GA	GD	Pts	Promotion, qualification or relegation
1	Stansfeld (C, P)	38	27	7	4	78	33	+45	88	Promotion to the Premier Division
2	Sutton Athletic (O, P)	38	24	7	7	102	63	+39	79	Qualification for the play-offs
3	Larkfield & New Hythe Wanderers	38	22	10	6	81	47	+34	76	Qualification for the play-offs
4	Snodland Town	38	22	5	11	85	43	+42	71	Qualification for the play-offs
5	Tooting Bec	38	19	10	9	73	57	+16	67	Qualification for the play-offs
6	Bridon Ropes	38	19	8	11	89	53	+36	65	
7	Sporting Club Thamesmead	38	18	6	14	74	59	+15	60	
8	Croydon	38	18	6	14	67	62	+5	60	
9	Lewisham Borough	38	15	9	14	59	53	+6	54	
10	Rochester United	38	14	11	13	62	58	+4	53	
11	FC Elmstead	38	13	8	17	67	67	0	47	
12	Greenways	38	11	12	15	79	82	−3	45	
13	Faversham Strike Force	38	11	12	15	63	86	−23	45	
14	Kent Football United	38	13	5	20	57	80	−23	44	
15	Lydd Town	38	12	8	18	63	91	−28	44	
16	Westside	38	12	4	22	70	81	−11	40	Transfer to the Combined Counties League
17	Staplehurst Monarchs	38	9	9	20	49	78	−29	36	
18	Meridian VP	38	10	4	24	46	80	−34	34	Reprieve from relegation (Note: All third-from-bottom clubs at Step 6 were reprieved from relegation. The top 15 second-from-bottom sides were also reprieved on a PPG basis.)
19	Forest Hill Park	38	6	9	23	33	65	−32	27	Reprieve from relegation
20	Chessington & Hook United	38	7	6	25	39	98	−59	27	Transfer to the Southern Combination League (Note: Chessington and Hook United had their relegation reprieved.)

Source: FA Full-Time
Rules for classification: 1) points; 2) goal difference; 3) number of goals scored; 4) number of matches won; 5) head-to-head results
(C) Champions; (O) Play-off winners; (P) Promoted

=== Play-offs ===
Semifinals
2	Sutton Athletic	3
5	Tooting Bec	0
3	Larkfield & New Hythe Wanderers	1
4	Snodland Town	0

Final
2	Sutton Athletic	2 (AET)
3	Larkfield & New Hythe Wanderers	1

==== Semifinals ====
26 April 2022	Larkfield & New Hythe Wanderers	1–0	Snodland Town	New Hythe
		Report		Stadium: Larkfield & New Hythe Sports Club; Attendance: 501

27 April 2022	Sutton Athletic	3–0	Tooting Bec	Hextable
		Report		Stadium: Lower Road; Attendance: 170

==== Final ====
7 May 2022	Sutton Athletic	2–1 (a.e.t.)	Larkfield & New Hythe Wanderers	Hextable
		Report		Stadium: Lower Road; Attendance: 506

=== Stadia and locations ===
Locations of the Division One clubs (Greater London)
Locations of the Division One clubs (Kent)

Club	Location	Stadium	Capacity
Bridon Ropes	Charlton	Meridian Sports & Social Club	
Chessington & Hook United	Chessington	Chalky Lane	3,000
Croydon	Croydon	Croydon Arena	8,000
Faversham Strike Force	Faversham	Rochester United Sports Ground (groundshare with Rochester United)	1,000
FC Elmstead	Hextable	Lower Road (groundshare with Sutton Athletic)	
Forest Hill Park	Catford	Ladywell Arena (groundshare with Lewisham Borough)	
Greenways	Gravesend	K Sports Cobdown (groundshare with K Sports)	
Kent Football United	Dartford	EFES Stadium	
Larkfield & New Hythe Wanderers	Larkfield	Larkfield & New Hythe Sports Club	3,000
Lewisham Borough	Catford	Ladywell Arena	
Lydd Town	Lydd	The Lindsey Field	1,000
Meridian VP	Charlton	Meridian Sports & Social Club	
Rochester United	Strood	Rochester United Sports Ground	1,000
Snodland Town	Snodland	Potyns Sports Ground	1,000
Sporting Club Thamesmead	Thamesmead	Bayliss Avenue	800
Stansfeld	Chislehurst	Foxbury Avenue (groundshare with Glebe)	1,200
Staplehurst Monarchs	Staplehurst	Jubilee Sports Ground	1,000
Sutton Athletic	Hextable	Lower Road	
Tooting Bec	Tooting Bec	Imperial Fields (groundshare with Tooting & Mitcham United)	2,000
Westside	Wimbledon	Wibbandune Sports Ground (groundshare with Colliers Wood United)	2,000
