= 2022–23 Southern Counties East Football League =

The 2022–23 Southern Counties East Football League season was the 57th in the history of the Southern Counties East Football League, and the seventh year the competition has two divisions, the Premier Division and Division One, at levels 9 and 10 of the English football league system.

The provisional club allocations for steps 5 and 6 were announced by The Football Association on 12 May 2022.

== Premier Division ==
Southern Counties East Football League Premier Division
- Season: 2022–23
- Champions: Erith & Belvedere
- Promoted: Erith & Belvedere; Phoenix Sports
- Relegated: Canterbury City; K Sports

The Premier Division comprised 16 clubs from the previous season, along with four new clubs after Sheppey United and Chatham Town were promoted to Isthmian League South East Division, Crowborough Athletic's transfer to Southern Combination Football League and Tower Hamlets' relegation to Eastern Counties League Division One South

The four clubs that joined the division were:

- Phoenix Sports - Relegated from Isthmian League South East Division
- Stansfeld - Promoted from Division One
- Sutton Athletic - Promoted from Division One
- Whitstable Town - Relegated from Isthmian League South East Division

=== Premier Division table ===
Pos	Team	Pld	W	D	L	GF	GA	GD	Pts	Promotion, qualification or relegation
1	Erith & Belvedere (C, P)	38	25	8	5	94	43	+51	83	Promotion to Isthmian League
2	Phoenix Sports (O, P)	38	24	9	5	89	33	+56	81	Qualification for an inter-step play-off
3	Deal Town	38	24	8	6	79	36	+43	80	
4	Erith Town	38	23	5	10	79	49	+30	74	
5	Whitstable Town	38	19	6	13	73	56	+17	63	
6	Rusthall	38	16	10	12	70	57	+13	58	
7	Glebe	38	17	7	14	73	62	+11	58	
8	Tunbridge Wells	38	15	9	14	53	47	+6	54	
9	Stansfeld	38	15	8	15	64	61	+3	53	
10	Punjab United	38	15	8	15	72	74	−2	53	
11	Fisher	38	15	7	16	61	57	+4	52	
12	Kennington	38	16	3	19	68	73	−5	51	
13	Bearsted	38	13	9	16	44	51	−7	48	
14	Sutton Athletic	38	13	9	16	75	83	−8	48	
15	Hollands & Blair	38	11	12	15	55	71	−16	45	
16	Lordswood	38	13	5	20	49	79	−30	44	
17	Holmesdale	38	8	10	20	34	57	−23	34	
18	Welling Town	38	10	4	24	48	91	−43	34	
19	Canterbury City (R)	38	7	10	21	53	97	−44	31	Relegation to Division One
20	K Sports (R)	38	7	1	30	54	110	−56	22	Relegation to Division One

Source: The FA Full-Time
Rules for classification: 1) points; 2) goal difference; 3) number of goals scored; 4) number of matches won; 5) head-to-head results
(C) Champions; (O) Play-off winners; (P) Promoted; (R) Relegated

=== Play-off ===
Inter-step play-off

29 April 2023	VCD Athletic	0–1	Phoenix Sports	Crayford
15:00			Hayes 90+4'	Stadium: Oakwood; Attendance: 820

=== Results table ===
Home \ Away	BEA	CAN	DEA	ERB	ERT	FIS	GLB	H&B	HOL	KSP	KEN	LOR	PHO	PUN	RUS	STA	SUT	TUN	WEL	WHI
Bearsted	—	1–3	1–1	1–2	2–2	2–1	1–0	2–2	2–1	1–0	1–0	0–2	0–2	1–0	3–5	2–0	1–1	0–3	1–1	1–2
Canterbury City	1–2	—	0–1	1–1	3–3	3–1	1–1	1–1	3–2	0–8	2–2	0–0	1–4	1–5	1–2	0–3	4–4	0–3	3–4	0–3
Deal Town	2–0	3–1	—	1–2	1–0	2–1	3–1	1–1	5–0	2–1	5–0	4–1	1–1	1–1	1–0	2–3	2–0	3–0	2–1	2–1
Erith & Belvedere	3–0	2–0	0–3	—	1–0	3–3	4–2	1–2	4–0	5–1	6–1	3–3	2–1	6–2	2–0	1–1	4–4	1–5	4–0	1–2
Erith Town	2–1	1–2	0–2	0–2	—	1–1	3–2	1–0	3–1	1–2	3–2	1–0	1–3	3–2	1–3	4–2	2–1	2–0	3–2	5–2
Fisher	1–0	4–2	0–1	1–3	0–1	—	5–1	2–2	1–1	2–1	3–2	4–0	0–2	1–2	3–0	1–0	5–0	1–1	3–1	0–1
Glebe	3–1	8–1	2–2	1–2	3–0	1–3	—	1–2	2–1	3–1	2–2	4–1	0–0	0–2	1–0	1–3	2–0	3–1	4–0	2–4
Hollands & Blair	0–3	0–0	1–3	0–4	1–2	1–1	1–0	—	1–2	7–1	0–4	0–1	1–2	4–1	3–3	1–3	0–5	1–2	1–0	2–3
Holmesdale	0–0	0–0	0–3	0–1	0–1	4–0	1–2	1–1	—	2–0	0–3	0–1	0–2	2–2	0–2	0–0	0–1	2–1	2–1	0–0
K Sports	1–2	1–5	3–2	0–4	1–7	1–3	1–2	1–3	0–2	—	4–0	2–3	0–2	1–4	0–4	3–4	2–2	4–1	0–3	0–4
Kennington	1–0	4–2	1–0	1–2	1–3	3–0	1–2	1–2	1–0	5–2	—	1–2	2–1	0–4	1–3	0–2	5–0	2–0	6–2	1–6
Lordswood	2–0	0–2	0–4	0–1	0–5	3–0	0–4	0–2	0–3	0–1	4–0	—	0–5	3–2	1–5	1–2	1–5	0–2	0–1	3–1
Phoenix Sports	1–1	3–0	3–0	2–2	2–1	2–1	2–2	6–0	4–0	2–1	3–0	3–0	—	4–3	0–2	4–0	5–0	1–2	3–0	2–1
Punjab United	2–1	3–2	1–2	1–0	0–2	0–1	1–4	2–2	1–1	3–1	4–2	3–7	1–2	—	1–1	1–1	3–1	4–3	2–1	0–0
Rusthall	0–2	3–0	2–2	1–5	2–2	2–2	1–1	0–1	1–1	4–2	0–2	2–2	1–1	5–2	—	1–0	2–2	2–0	4–1	2–1
Stansfeld	1–0	3–1	0–0	0–2	1–2	2–0	5–0	1–1	1–1	6–0	0–6	1–3	1–1	4–1	1–0	—	2–4	0–2	1–2	0–2
Sutton Athletic	2–2	4–1	1–3	0–3	1–4	2–3	1–1	3–3	2–0	4–1	3–1	3–1	2–2	1–3	5–1	3–2	—	0–3	4–1	1–2
Tunbridge Wells	1–1	1–2	2–2	0–0	0–0	2–1	1–2	2–2	1–0	3–0	0–0	1–1	1–4	0–0	1–0	1–2	2–0	—	1–0	0–2
Welling Town	0–3	2–2	4–3	1–3	0–3	1–0	0–2	4–1	2–4	0–4	0–3	0–1	0–0	2–1	0–2	5–4	1–3	0–4	—	2–2
Whitstable Town	0–2	4–2	0–2	2–2	0–4	1–2	4–1	1–2	2–0	3–1	0–1	2–2	3–2	1–2	3–2	2–2	3–0	2–0	1–3	—

Source: FA Full-Time Grid
Legend: Blue = home team win; Yellow = draw; Red = away team win.
For upcoming matches, an "a" indicates there is an article about the rivalry between the two participants.

=== Stadia and locations ===
Locations of the Premier Division clubs (Greater London)
Locations of the Premier Division clubs (Kent)

Club	Location	Stadium	Capacity
Bearsted	Otham	Honey Lane	1,000
Canterbury City	Canterbury	Woodstock Park (groundshare with Sittingbourne)	1,930
Deal Town	Deal	Charles Sports Ground	2,000
Erith & Belvedere	Welling	Park View Road (groundshare with Welling United)	4,000
Erith Town	Thamesmead	Erith Leisure Center	
Fisher	Rotherhithe	St Paul's Sports Ground	2,500
Glebe	Chislehurst	Foxbury Avenue	1,200
Hollands & Blair	Gillingham	Star Meadow	1,000
Holmesdale	Bromley	Oakley Road	
K Sports	Aylesford	K Sports Cobdown	
Kennington	Kennington	The Homelands (groundshare with Ashford United)	3,200
Lordswood	Lordswoood	Martyn Grove	600
Phoenix Sports	Barnehurst	Phoenix Sports Ground	2,000
Punjab United	Gravesend	Elite Venue	600
Rusthall	Rusthall	The Jockey Farm Stadium	1,500
Stansfeld	Chislehurst	Foxbury Avenue (groundshare with Glebe)	1,200
Sutton Athletic	Hextable	Lower Road	
Tunbridge Wells	Royal Tunbridge Wells	Culverden Stadium	3,750
Welling Town	Welling	The Bauvill Stadium (groundshare with Chatham Town)	5,000
Whitstable Town	Whitstable	The Belmont Ground	3,000

== Division One ==
Southern Counties East Football League Division One
- Season: 2022–23
- Champions: Snodland Town
- Promoted: Snodland Town; Lydd Town
- Relegated: Bermondsey Town

Division One consisted of eighteen teams, down from twenty teams in the previous season. Teams that left Division One from the previous season were Stansfeld and Sutton Athletic who had been promoted to the Premier Division, Chessington & Hook United's relegation was reprieved and transferred to the Southern Combination Football League Division One and Westside who were relocated to the Combined Counties Football League.

The two new teams that joined the division were:

- AFC Whyteleafe - Applied from Surrey South Eastern Combination Intermediate Division One
- Bermondsey Town - Applied from Bromley & South London Football League

=== Division One table ===
Pos	Team	Pld	W	D	L	GF	GA	GD	Pts	Promotion, qualification or relegation
1	Snodland Town (C, P)	32	20	6	6	80	39	+41	66	Promotion to the Premier Division
2	Tooting Bec	32	17	7	8	61	39	+22	58	Qualification for the play-offs
3	Lydd Town (O, P)	32	17	5	10	62	54	+8	56	Qualification for the play-offs
4	Faversham Strike Force	32	15	9	8	64	46	+18	54	Qualification for the play-offs
5	Larkfield & New Hythe Wanderers	32	16	6	10	53	39	+14	54	Qualification for the play-offs
6	Rochester United	32	15	7	10	50	37	+13	52	
7	FC Elmstead	32	13	7	12	58	43	+15	46	
8	AFC Whyteleafe	32	12	10	10	66	54	+12	46	
9	Bridon Ropes	32	13	5	14	63	59	+4	44	
10	Croydon	32	12	8	12	57	55	+2	44	
11	Greenways	32	13	5	14	60	68	−8	44	
12	Lewisham Borough	32	12	6	14	54	46	+8	42	
13	Staplehurst Monarchs	32	12	6	14	41	47	−6	42	
14	Forest Hill Park	32	10	10	12	37	41	−4	40	
15	Meridian VP	32	11	4	17	41	63	−22	37	
16	Sporting Club Thamesmead	32	8	3	21	42	81	−39	27	
17	Bermondsey Town	32	2	4	26	29	107	−78	10	Relegated to Kent County League
18	Kent Football United (Note: Kent Football United withdrew from the league and folded their senior team on 23 August 2022.)	0	0	0	0	0	0	0	0	Results expunged

Source: The FA Full-Time
Rules for classification: 1) points; 2) goal difference; 3) number of goals scored; 4) number of matches won; 5) head-to-head results
(C) Champions; (O) Play-off winners; (P) Promoted

=== Play-offs ===
Semifinals
2	Tooting Bec	0 (5)
5	Larkfield & New Hythe Wanderers	0 (4)
3	Lydd Town	4
4	Faversham Strike Force	2

Final
2	Tooting Bec	1 (4)
3	Lydd Town	1 (5)

==== Semifinals ====
19 April 2023	Tooting Bec	0–0 (a.e.t.) (5–4 p)	Larkfield & New Hythe Wanderers	Chipstead
		Report		Stadium: High Road

19 April 2023	Lydd Town	4–2	Faversham Strike Force	Lydd
		Report		Stadium: The Lindsey Field; Attendance: 281

==== Final ====
22 April 2023	Tooting Bec	1–1 (a.e.t.) (4–5 p)	Lydd Town	Lydd
		Report		Stadium: The Lindsey Field; Attendance: 245

=== Stadia and locations ===
Locations of the Division One clubs (Greater London)
Locations of the Division One clubs (Kent)

Club	Location	Stadium	Capacity
AFC Whyteleafe	Whyteleafe	Church Road	2,000
Bermondsey Town	Rotherhithe	St Paul's Sports Ground (groundshare with Fisher)	2,500
Bridon Ropes	Charlton	Meridian Sports & Social Club	
Croydon	Croydon	Croydon Arena	8,000
Faversham Strike Force	Faversham	Salters Lane (groundshare with Faversham Town)	2,000
FC Elmstead	Hextable	Lower Road (groundshare with Sutton Athletic)	
Forest Hill Park	Catford	Ladywell Arena (groundshare with Lewisham Borough)	
Greenways	Gravesend	K Sports Cobdown (groundshare with K Sports)	
Larkfield & New Hythe Wanderers	Larkfield	Larkfield & New Hythe Sports Club	3,000
Lewisham Borough	Catford	Ladywell Arena	
Lydd Town	Lydd	The Lindsey Field	1,000
Meridian VP	Charlton	Meridian Sports & Social Club	
Rochester United	Strood	Rochester United Sports Ground	1,000
Snodland Town	Snodland	Potyns Sports Ground	1,000
Sporting Club Thamesmead	Thamesmead	Bayliss Avenue	800
Staplehurst Monarchs	Staplehurst	Jubilee Sports Ground	1,000
Tooting Bec	Tooting Bec	High Road (groundshare with Chipstead)	2,000
