= 2023–24 Southern Counties East Football League =

The 2023–24 Southern Counties East Football League season was the 58th in the history of the Southern Counties East Football League, and the eighth year the competition will have two divisions, the Premier Division and Division One, at levels 9 and 10 of the English football league system.

The provisional club allocations for steps 5 and 6 were announced by The Football Association on 15 May 2023. Starting this season, the Premier Division (step 5) in the league promotes two clubs; one as champions and one via a four-team play-off. This replaced the previous inter-step play-off system. For this season only, there was only one club relegated from the division.

== Premier Division ==
Southern Counties East Football League Premier Division
- Season: 2023–24
- Champions: Deal Town
- Promoted: Deal Town; Erith Town
- Relegated: Welling Town
- Top goalscorer: Stefan Payne (35)

The Premier Division comprised 16 clubs from the previous season, along with five new clubs after Erith & Belvedere and Phoenix Sports were promoted to Isthmian League South East Division and Canterbury City and K Sports were relegated to Division One.

The five clubs joining the division were:

- Corinthian - Relegated from Isthmian League South East Division
- Faversham Town - Relegated from Isthmian League South East Division
- Lydd Town - Promoted from Division One
- Snodland Town - Promoted from Division One
- VCD Athletic - Relegated from Isthmian League South East Division

=== Premier Division table ===
| Pos | Team | Pld | W | D | L | GF | GA | GD | Pts | Promotion, qualification or relegation |
|---|---|---|---|---|---|---|---|---|---|---|
| 1 | Deal Town (C, P) | 40 | 29 | 5 | 6 | 96 | 45 | +51 | 92 | Promotion to the Isthmian League |
| 2 | Faversham Town | 40 | 25 | 8 | 7 | 107 | 53 | +54 | 83 | Qualification for the play-offs |
| 3 | Glebe | 40 | 24 | 11 | 5 | 87 | 48 | +39 | 83 | Qualification for the play-offs |
| 4 | Erith Town (O, P) | 40 | 25 | 5 | 10 | 91 | 52 | +39 | 80 | Qualification for the play-offs |
| 5 | Corinthian | 40 | 24 | 7 | 9 | 86 | 49 | +37 | 79 | Qualification for the play-offs |
| 6 | Whitstable Town | 40 | 22 | 7 | 11 | 79 | 52 | +27 | 73 | |
| 7 | Bearsted | 40 | 21 | 9 | 10 | 66 | 43 | +23 | 72 | |
| 8 | Snodland Town | 40 | 19 | 8 | 13 | 77 | 44 | +33 | 65 | |
| 9 | Punjab United | 40 | 18 | 11 | 11 | 69 | 58 | +11 | 65 | |
| 10 | Lydd Town | 40 | 19 | 7 | 14 | 78 | 64 | +14 | 64 | |
| 11 | Lordswood | 40 | 14 | 13 | 13 | 64 | 63 | +1 | 55 | |
| 12 | VCD Athletic | 40 | 13 | 11 | 16 | 61 | 64 | −3 | 50 | |
| 13 | Tunbridge Wells | 40 | 13 | 10 | 17 | 64 | 64 | 0 | 49 | |
| 14 | Fisher | 40 | 14 | 6 | 20 | 70 | 85 | −15 | 48 | |
| 15 | Hollands & Blair | 40 | 13 | 8 | 19 | 61 | 76 | −15 | 47 | |
| 16 | Holmesdale | 40 | 11 | 9 | 20 | 59 | 77 | −18 | 42 | |
| 17 | Kennington | 40 | 9 | 10 | 21 | 50 | 80 | −30 | 37 | |
| 18 | Stansfeld | 40 | 6 | 7 | 27 | 42 | 99 | −57 | 25 | |
| 19 | Rusthall | 40 | 5 | 8 | 27 | 42 | 86 | −44 | 23 | |
| 20 | Sutton Athletic | 40 | 5 | 8 | 27 | 42 | 102 | −60 | 23 | |
| 21 | Welling Town (R) | 40 | 4 | 6 | 30 | 45 | 132 | −87 | 18 | Relegation to Division One |

Source: The FA Full-Time
Rules for classification: 1) points; 2) goal difference; 3) number of goals scored; 4) number of matches won; 5) head-to-head results
(C) Champions; (O) Play-off winners; (P) Promoted; (R) Relegated

=== Play-offs ===
Semi-finals
2 | Faversham Town | 2 (1)
5 | Corinthian | 2 (4)
3 | Glebe | 1
4 | Erith Town | 2

Final
4 | Erith Town | 1 (4)
5 | Corinthian | 1 (2)

==== Semifinals ====
| 30 April 2024 | Faversham Town | 2–2 (1–4 p) | Corinthian | Faversham |
| 19:45 BST | Bingham 4'; Essam 22' | Report | Hagan 14'; Naylor 63' | Stadium: Salters Lane; Attendance: 803 |

| 30 April 2024 | Glebe | 1–2 | Erith Town | Chislehurst |
| 19:45 BST | Mampono 16' | Report | Ash 78'; Taylor 83' | Stadium: Foxbury Avenue; Attendance: 450 |

==== Final ====
| 6 May 2024 | Erith Town | 1–1 (4–2 p) | Corinthian | Thamesmead |
| 15:00 BST | Taylor 86' | | Hagan 22' | Stadium: Bayliss Avenue; Attendance: 671 |

=== Results table ===
| Home \ Away | BEA | COR | DEA | ERT | FAV | FIS | GLB | H&B | HOL | KEN | LOR | LYD | PUN | RUS | SNT | STA | SUT | TUN | VCD | WEL | WHI |
|---|---|---|---|---|---|---|---|---|---|---|---|---|---|---|---|---|---|---|---|---|---|
| Bearsted | — | 1–0 | 2–4 | 3–2 | 1–2 | 2–0 | 0–2 | 1–0 | 1–1 | 3–1 | 1–0 | 2–0 | 4–1 | 3–0 | 2–0 | 4–0 | 2–0 | 2–1 | 0–0 | 5–1 | 0–0 |
| Corinthian | 1–3 | — | 3–0 | 2–1 | 3–2 | 4–1 | 1–2 | 2–2 | 2–1 | 5–1 | 4–1 | 3–1 | 5–0 | 2–1 | 0–0 | 2–1 | 1–1 | 3–1 | 4–1 | 4–0 | 3–1 |
| Deal Town | 2–0 | 2–1 | — | 2–0 | 2–2 | 3–0 | 4–2 | 4–0 | 4–1 | 2–0 | 3–1 | 3–1 | 1–2 | 7–3 | 0–3 | 3–0 | 3–1 | 3–0 | 0–2 | 1–0 | 3–0 |
| Erith Town | 4–0 | 3–4 | 2–3 | — | 2–3 | 5–2 | 1–1 | 1–0 | 2–1 | 4–2 | 2–1 | 2–1 | 2–1 | 5–1 | 1–0 | 4–1 | 5–1 | 2–1 | | 4–2 | 0–1 |
| Faversham Town | 4–0 | 4–0 | 2–4 | 3–4 | — | 5–0 | 0–2 | 5–2 | 6–1 | 2–1 | 2–3 | 2–4 | 3–1 | 2–2 | 2–1 | 8–0 | 5–1 | 2–2 | 2–0 | 4–1 | 2–1 |
| Fisher | 1–0 | 0–3 | 3–1 | 4–2 | 1–4 | — | 3–3 | 4–2 | 0–2 | 0–0 | 0–1 | 1–3 | 0–3 | 3–1 | 2–5 | 2–2 | 1–2 | 3–1 | 3–2 | 4–0 | 3–4 |
| Glebe | 2–0 | 3–1 | 1–3 | 2–2 | 2–2 | 3–2 | — | 3–0 | 2–1 | 2–2 | 1–0 | 1–3 | 0–0 | 2–0 | 2–0 | 2–2 | 5–0 | 3–2 | 4–0 | 1–1 | 2–0 |
| Hollands & Blair | 0–0 | 0–0 | 1–3 | 1–3 | 1–2 | 1–5 | 1–2 | — | 0–4 | 4–3 | 4–1 | 1–1 | 1–3 | 2–1 | 1–1 | 1–0 | 1–0 | 2–2 | 4–2 | 10–1 | 0–3 |
| Holmesdale | 1–6 | 1–2 | 1–1 | 0–2 | 0–0 | 2–1 | 3–2 | 1–1 | — | 1–2 | 4–2 | 1–2 | 0–2 | 2–0 | 2–2 | 2–3 | 1–1 | 0–2 | 2–2 | 4–2 | 0–4 |
| Kennington | 1–1 | 0–3 | 0–3 | 0–0 | 1–3 | 1–1 | 1–3 | 1–1 | 2–0 | — | 1–3 | 1–2 | 2–1 | 1–1 | 2–3 | 3–0 | 2–0 | 4–3 | 2–2 | 2–2 | 2–4 |
| Lordswood | 0–0 | 1–1 | 2–2 | 1–1 | 0–0 | 2–1 | 0–1 | 5–0 | 2–2 | 4–0 | — | 0–0 | 1–4 | 1–0 | 0–3 | 3–2 | 5–0 | 1–0 | 2–4 | 1–0 | 0–4 |
| Lydd Town | 1–2 | 0–3 | 0–2 | 2–1 | 4–1 | A/W (Note: Match awarded to Fisher in accordance with league rules, after initial match was abandoned at 2–3 due to unsavoury scenes between the Lydd Town players and Fisher fans.) | 0–4 | 2–1 | 0–3 | 2–1 | 0–0 | — | 3–0 | 4–4 | 2–0 | 3–2 | 3–0 | 2–2 | 2–3 | 5–2 | 4–0 |
| Punjab United | 2–2 | 2–0 | 1–1 | 2–2 | 0–2 | 2–0 | 1–3 | 0–1 | 1–1 | 0–0 | 2–3 | 3–1 | — | 2–0 | 0–4 | 2–1 | 4–2 | 2–1 | 3–2 | 4–0 | 4–2 |
| Rusthall | 2–0 | 2–4 | 0–2 | 0–2 | 1–2 | 1–2 | 0–0 | 1–3 | 2–4 | 2–1 | 1–1 | 0–1 | 2–2 | — | 0–2 | 3–1 | 3–4 | 0–2 | 3–1 | 0–3 | 0–3 |
| Snodland Town | 0–2 | 0–0 | 3–3 | 0–1 | 1–1 | 5–2 | 3–1 | 0–1 | 6–2 | 4–1 | 2–2 | 2–1 | 0–0 | 1–0 | — | 2–0 | 3–0 | A/W (Note: Match awarded to Tunbridge Wells in accordance with league rules, after initial match was abandoned at 0–0 due to the behaviour of Snodland Town's players and staff.) | 1–2 | 5–0 | 0–1 |
| Stansfeld | 1–1 | 2–2 | 1–2 | 0–3 | 0–2 | 1–3 | 2–2 | 0–4 | 2–1 | 2–0 | 0–2 | 1–3 | 0–3 | 1–2 | 0–4 | — | 1–0 | 0–2 | 1–4 | 2–1 | 1–4 |
| Sutton Athletic | 1–2 | 0–3 | 1–2 | 1–2 | 2–5 | 1–1 | 0–2 | 2–3 | 0–2 | 1–2 | 2–2 | 0–3 | 1–3 | 1–1 | 0–2 | 2–0 | — | 4–4 | 1–1 | 2–1 | 0–3 |
| Tunbridge Wells | 1–1 | 2–3 | 1–0 | 0–2 | 0–2 | 0–1 | 3–4 | 1–0 | 1–0 | 0–1 | 3–2 | 2–2 | 0–1 | 2–1 | 1–3 | 3–3 | 5–0 | — | 2–1 | 2–2 | 3–0 |
| VCD Athletic | 0–1 | 2–0 | 0–3 | 0–2 | 0–3 | 2–2 | 1–4 | 3–1 | 2–0 | 2–0 | 2–2 | 4–0 | 2–2 | 2–0 | 1–0 | 1–1 | 1–1 | 0–0 | — | 4–0 | 0–1 |
| Welling Town | 2–5 | 1–2 | 0–2 | 0–6 | 0–2 | 2–1 | 2–3 | 1–3 | 0–4 | 1–3 | 1–3 | 0–7 | 2–2 | 0–0 | 3–5 | 3–2 | 2–6 | 2–6 | 1–1 | — | 0–3 |
| Whitstable Town | 2–1 | 2–0 | 2–3 | 2–0 | 2–2 | 0–4 | 1–1 | 2–0 | 3–0 | 3–0 | 3–3 | 1–1 | 1–1 | 3–1 | 3–1 | 1–3 | 5–0 | 0–0 | 2–1 | 2–3 | — |

Source: FA Full-Time Grid
Legend: Blue = home team win; Yellow = draw; Red = away team win.
For upcoming matches, an "a" indicates there is an article about the rivalry between the two participants.

=== Stadia and locations ===
Locations of the Premier Division clubs (Greater London)
Locations of the Premier Division clubs (Kent)

| Club | Location | Stadium | Capacity |
|---|---|---|---|
| Bearsted | Otham | Honey Lane | 1,000 |
| Corinthian | Longfield | Gay Dawn Farm | 2,000 |
| Deal Town | Deal | Charles Sports Ground | 2,000 |
| Erith Town | Thamesmead | Bayliss Avenue | 800 |
| Faversham Town | Faversham | Salters Lane | 2,000 |
| Fisher | Rotherhithe | St Paul's Sports Ground | 2,500 |
| Glebe | Chislehurst | Foxbury Avenue | 1,200 |
| Hollands & Blair | Gillingham | Star Meadow | 1,000 |
| Holmesdale | Bromley | Oakley Road | |
| Kennington | Kennington | The Homelands (groundshare with Ashford United) | 3,200 |
| Lordswood | Lordswoood | Martyn Grove | 600 |
| Lydd Town | Lydd | The Lindsey Field | 1,000 |
| Punjab United | Gravesend | Elite Venue | 600 |
| Rusthall | Rusthall | The Jockey Farm Stadium | 1,500 |
| Snodland Town | Snodland | Potyns Sports Ground | 1,000 |
| Stansfeld | Chislehurst | Foxbury Avenue (groundshare with Glebe) | 1,200 |
| Sutton Athletic | Hextable | Lower Road | |
| Tunbridge Wells | Royal Tunbridge Wells | Culverden Stadium | 3,750 |
| VCD Athletic | Crayford | The Oakwood | 1,180 |
| Welling Town | Welling | Phoenix Sports Ground (groundshare with Phoenix Sports) | 2,000 |
| Whitstable Town | Whitstable | The Belmont Ground | 3,000 |

== Division One ==
Southern Counties East Football League Division One
- Season: 2023–24
- Champions: AFC Whyteleafe
- Promoted: AFC Whyteleafe; Larkfield & New Hythe Wanderers
- Relegated: Greenways
- Top goalscorer: Matt Day (31)

Division One consisted of sixteen teams, down from eighteen teams in the previous season. Teams that left Division One from the previous season were Snodland Town and Lydd Town who had been promoted to the Premier Division and Bermondsey Town who were relegated to the Kent County League

The two new teams that joined the division were:

- Canterbury City - Relegated from Premier Division
- K Sports - Relegated from Premier Division

=== Division One table ===
| Pos | Team | Pld | W | D | L | GF | GA | GD | Pts | Promotion, qualification or relegation |
|---|---|---|---|---|---|---|---|---|---|---|
| 1 | AFC Whyteleafe (C, P) | 30 | 22 | 5 | 3 | 84 | 35 | +49 | 71 | Promotion to the Premier Division |
| 2 | Larkfield & New Hythe Wanderers (O, P) | 30 | 19 | 6 | 5 | 77 | 38 | +39 | 63 | Qualification for the play-offs |
| 3 | Staplehurst Monarchs | 30 | 18 | 6 | 6 | 54 | 29 | +25 | 60 | Qualification for the play-offs |
| 4 | Rochester United | 30 | 19 | 2 | 9 | 72 | 41 | +31 | 59 | Qualification for the play-offs |
| 5 | Lewisham Borough | 30 | 15 | 7 | 8 | 57 | 38 | +19 | 52 | Qualification for the play-offs |
| 6 | FC Elmstead | 30 | 15 | 5 | 10 | 62 | 42 | +20 | 50 | |
| 7 | Canterbury City | 30 | 15 | 3 | 12 | 58 | 46 | +12 | 48 | |
| 8 | Croydon | 30 | 13 | 5 | 12 | 62 | 49 | +13 | 44 | |
| 9 | Tooting Bec | 30 | 10 | 7 | 13 | 48 | 46 | +2 | 37 | |
| 10 | Bridon Ropes | 30 | 9 | 9 | 12 | 41 | 57 | −16 | 36 | |
| 11 | Faversham Strike Force | 30 | 10 | 3 | 17 | 48 | 63 | −15 | 33 | |
| 12 | Sporting Club Thamesmead | 30 | 9 | 5 | 16 | 38 | 69 | −31 | 32 | |
| 13 | K Sports | 30 | 7 | 7 | 16 | 56 | 88 | −32 | 28 | |
| 14 | Meridian VP | 30 | 6 | 7 | 17 | 50 | 82 | −32 | 25 | |
| 15 | Forest Hill Park | 30 | 6 | 6 | 18 | 36 | 61 | −25 | 24 | |
| 16 | Greenways | 30 | 4 | 3 | 23 | 45 | 104 | −59 | 15 | |

Source: The FA Full-Time
Rules for classification: 1) points; 2) goal difference; 3) number of goals scored; 4) number of matches won; 5) head-to-head results
(C) Champions; (O) Play-off winners; (P) Promoted

=== Play-offs ===
Semi-finals
2 | Larkfield & New Hythe Wanderers | 0 (13)
5 | Lewisham Borough | 0 (12)
3 | Staplehurst Monarchs | 1
4 | Rochester United | 0

Final
2 | Larkfield & New Hythe Wanderers | 1
3 | Staplehurst Monarchs | 0

==== Semifinals ====
| 30 April 2024 | Larkfield & New Hythe Wanderers | 0–0 (13–12 p) | Lewisham Borough | New Hythe |
| 19:45 BST | | Report | | Stadium: Larkfield & New Hythe Sports Club; Attendance: 235 |

| 1 May 2024 | Staplehurst Monarchs | 1–0 | Rochester United | Staplehurst |
| 19:45 BST | Smith 40' | Report | | Stadium: Jubilee Sports Ground; Attendance: 342 |

==== Final ====
| 4 May 2024 | Larkfield & New Hythe Wanderers | 1–0 | Staplehurst Monarchs | New Hythe |
| | | Report | | Stadium: Larkfield & New Hythe Sports Club; Attendance: 828 |

=== Results table ===
| Home \ Away | WHY | BRI | CAN | CRO | ELM | FAV | FHP | GRE | KSP | LAR | LEW | MER | ROC | SCT | STM | TOO |
|---|---|---|---|---|---|---|---|---|---|---|---|---|---|---|---|---|
| AFC Whyteleafe | — | 7–1 | 2–1 | 2–2 | 3–0 | 4–1 | 1–0 | 8–3 | 2–0 | 2–3 | 3–1 | 4–1 | 2–2 | 7–0 | 1–1 | 1–1 |
| Bridon Ropes | A/W (Note: Match awarded to AFC Whyteleafe in accordance with league rules, after initial match was abandoned with AFC Whteleafe leading 3–1 due to two members of the Bridon Ropes coaching staff refusing to leave the technical area having been sent off.) | — | 1–1 | 0–5 | 0–2 | 3–2 | 1–0 | 4–1 | 2–3 | 1–1 | 2–1 | 2–2 | 2–2 | 1–2 | 1–2 | 0–5 |
| Canterbury City | 2–3 | 4–1 | — | 2–1 | 1–5 | 1–3 | 6–1 | 4–1 | 2–1 | 2–1 | 3–1 | 3–2 | 0–1 | 3–2 | 0–1 | 3–2 |
| Croydon | 2–2 | 1–2 | 2–3 | — | 1–0 | 1–2 | 4–1 | 1–1 | 7–1 | 1–2 | 3–4 | 2–2 | 3–1 | 2–0 | 0–2 | 3–1 |
| FC Elmstead | 0–1 | 1–1 | 3–0 | 1–0 | — | 2–1 | 3–1 | 4–1 | 0–2 | 1–3 | 0–1 | 2–0 | 2–3 | 2–2 | 0–1 | 1–1 |
| Faversham Strike Force | 1–6 | 2–2 | 2–1 | 2–3 | 2–4 | — | 0–2 | 5–1 | 0–3 | 2–1 | 0–0 | 3–0 | 2–0 | 0–2 | 1–3 | 2–0 |
| Forest Hill Park | 0–3 | 0–4 | 1–0 | 3–3 | 1–4 | 0–3 | — | 2–4 | 2–2 | 1–1 | 0–2 | 4–2 | 0–1 | 1–0 | 1–2 | 1–1 |
| Greenways | 1–2 | 0–1 | 0–2 | 2–0 | 2–6 | 0–4 | 0–4 | — | 2–3 | 0–9 | 2–5 | 3–4 | 0–4 | 1–4 | 1–2 | 1–3 |
| K Sports | 3–4 | 3–3 | 1–2 | 1–3 | 1–3 | 3–3 | 2–2 | 3–4 | — | 1–4 | 1–5 | 2–1 | 0–8 | 4–3 | 1–1 | 0–2 |
| Larkfield & New Hythe Wanderers | 1–0 | 1–2 | 3–0 | 6–3 | 2–4 | 4–0 | 2–0 | 1–1 | 3–1 | — | 1–3 | 4–1 | 1–0 | 3–3 | 3–1 | 2–1 |
| Lewisham Borough | 1–2 | 3–0 | 1–1 | 0–1 | 1–1 | 4–1 | 2–1 | 1–1 | 2–1 | 1–1 | — | 1–1 | 4–1 | 0–2 | 2–2 | 2–1 |
| Meridian VP | 1–2 | 1–1 | 0–2 | 2–1 | 6–3 | 4–2 | 1–1 | 4–1 | 2–5 | 1–2 | 1–4 | — | 0–8 | 3–1 | 0–0 | 2–2 |
| Rochester United | 3–2 | 1–0 | 2–1 | 1–2 | 3–2 | 1–0 | 1–4 | 5–1 | 6–1 | 0–4 | 1–0 | 7–2 | — | 2–1 | 0–1 | 3–1 |
| Sporting Club Thamesmead | 0–1 | 0–0 | 0–7 | 0–3 | 0–3 | 3–2 | 1–0 | 1–7 | 3–3 | 2–2 | 0–2 | 2–1 | 2–0 | — | 0–2 | 0–2 |
| Staplehurst Monarchs | 1–2 | 1–0 | 1–0 | 1–2 | 1–1 | 3–0 | 3–1 | 4–1 | 4–1 | 2–3 | 1–2 | 4–2 | 1–2 | 4–0 | — | 1–0 |
| Tooting Bec | 1–2 | 0–2 | 1–1 | 2–0 | 0–2 | 2–0 | 2–1 | 4–2 | 3–3 | 1–3 | 3–1 | 4–1 | 0–3 | 1–2 | 1–1 | — |

Source: FA Full-Time Grid
Legend: Blue = home team win; Yellow = draw; Red = away team win.
For upcoming matches, an "a" indicates there is an article about the rivalry between the two participants.

=== Stadia and locations ===
Locations of the Division One clubs (Greater London)
Locations of the Division One clubs (Kent)

| Club | Location | Stadium | Capacity |
|---|---|---|---|
| AFC Whyteleafe | Whyteleafe | Church Road | 2,000 |
| Bridon Ropes | Charlton | Meridian Sports & Social Club | |
| Canterbury City | Canterbury | Hartsdown Park (groundshare with Margate) | 3,000 |
| Croydon | Croydon | Croydon Arena | 8,000 |
| Faversham Strike Force | Faversham | Salters Lane (groundshare with Faversham Town) | 2,000 |
| FC Elmstead | Hextable | Lower Road (groundshare with Sutton Athletic) | |
| Forest Hill Park | Catford | Ladywell Arena (groundshare with Lewisham Borough) | |
| Greenways | Gravesend | K Sports Cobdown (groundshare with K Sports) | |
| K Sports | Aylesford | K Sports Cobdown | |
| Larkfield & New Hythe Wanderers | Larkfield | Larkfield & New Hythe Sports Club | 3,000 |
| Lewisham Borough | Catford | Ladywell Arena | |
| Meridian VP | Charlton | Meridian Sports & Social Club | |
| Rochester United | Strood | Rochester United Sports Ground | 1,000 |
| Sporting Club Thamesmead | Thamesmead | Bayliss Avenue (groundshare with Erith Town) | 800 |
| Staplehurst Monarchs | Staplehurst | Jubilee Sports Ground | 1,000 |
| Tooting Bec | Tooting Bec | High Road (groundshare with Chipstead) | 2,000 |

== League Challenge Cup ==
The 2023–24 SCEFL Challenge Cup was contested by all 37 clubs from both the Premier and First divisions (indicated by '(PD)' and '(FD)' respectively in the results listings below).

Defending champions Hollands & Blair (who defeated Fisher in the previous season's final) were knocked-out in the second round.

The cup was won by Erith Town for the second occasion in their history (having previously been winners in the 2007–08 season). The final match was played at a neutral venue, this season at Star Meadow the home of Hollands & Blair F.C.

=== Calendar ===
| Round | Dates | Matches | Clubs |
|---|---|---|---|
| First round | 2 October to 4 October | 5 | 37 → 32 |
| Second round | 31 October to 21 November | 16 | 32 → 16 |
| Third round | 29 November to 9 January | 8 | 16 → 8 |
| Quarter-finals | 16 January to 10 February | 4 | 8 → 4 |
| Semi-finals | 20 February to 27 February | 2 | 4 → 2 |
| Final | 29 March | 1 | 2 → 1 |

=== First round ===
Ten clubs participated in five first round ties, with byes for the other 27 clubs.

| Tie | Home team (tier) | Score | Away team (tier) | Att. |
| 1 | SC Thamesmead (FD) | 0–3 | Lewisham Borough (FD) | 75 |
| 2 | Deal Town (PD) | 8–2 | Faversham Strike Force (FD) | 370 |
| 3 | Canterbury City (FD) | 1–2 | Snodland Town (PD) | 67 |
| 4 | Bridon Ropes (FD) | 0–2 | Croydon (FD) | 40 |
| 5 | Sutton Athletic (PD) | 2–3 | Welling United (PD) | 37 |

=== Second round ===
Thirty-two clubs competed in sixteen second round times.

| Tie | Home team (tier) | Score | Away team (tier) | Att. |
| 1 | Bearsted (PD) | 0–2 | Deal Town (PD) | 73 |
| 2 | Erith Town (PD) | 3–1 | Tooting Bec (FD) | 53 |
| 3 | Holmesdale (PD) | 3–3 (4–2 p) | Fisher (PD) | 38 |
| 4 | Kennington (PD) | 3–3 (5–4 p) | Hollands & Blair (PD) | 125 |
| 5 | Larkfield & New Hythe Wanderers (FD) | 2–2 (4–3 p) | Rochester United (FD) | |
| 6 | Meridian VP (FD) | 2–0 | Croydon (FD) | 20 |
| 7 | Rusthall (PD) | 4–0 | Forest Hill Park (FD) | |
| 8 | Stansfeld (PD) | 2–6 | Corinthian (PD) | |
| 9 | Whitstable Town (PD) | 5–2 | Lordswood (PD) | 172 |
| 10 | Lewisham Borough (FD) | 3–0 | Welling Town (PD) | |
| 11 | Greenways (FD) | 1–3 | Snodland Town (PD) | |
| 12 | Faversham Town (PD) | 3–1 | Lydd Town (PD) | 186 |
| 13 | Punjab United (PD) | 1–0 | FC Elmstead (FD) | 77 |
| 14 | Tunbridge Wells (PD) | 2–0 | Glebe (PD) | |
| 15 | K Sports (FD) | 0–4 | Staplehurst Monarchs (FD) | |
| 16 | VCD Athletic (PD) | 2–2 | AFC Whyteleafe (PD) | 80 |

=== Third round ===
Sixteen clubs competed in eight third round times.

| Tie | Home team (tier) | Score | Away team (tier) | Att. |
| 1 | Snodland Town (PD) | 0–1 | Tunbridge Wells (PD) | 104 |
| 2 | Erith Town (PD) | 3–0 | Rusthall (PD) | 53 |
| 3 | Larkfield & New Hythe Wanderers (FD) | 0–1 | Faversham Town (PD) | 60 |
| 4 | Meridian VP (FD) | 1–3 | Corinthian (PD) | 30 |
| 5 | Punjab United (PD) | 1–1 (4–5 p) | Holmesdale (PD) | 84 |
| 6 | Kennington (PD) | 1–0 | Whitstable Town (PD) | 102 |
| 7 | AFC Whyteleafe (FD) | 2–0 | Lewisham Borough (FD) | 168 |
| 8 | Deal Town (PD) | 5–1 | Staplehurst Monarchs (FD) | 256 |

=== Quarter-finals ===
| Tie | Home team (tier) | Score | Away team (tier) | Att. |
| 1 | AFC Whyteleafe (FD) | 2–1 | Tunbridge Wells (PD) | |
| 2 | Corinthian (PD) | 2–1 | Faversham Town (PD) | 80 |
| 3 | Kennington (PD) | 0–5 | Deal Town (PD) | 151 |
| 4 | Holmesdale (PD) | 1–3 | Erith Town (PD) | |

=== Semi-finals ===
- First leg

| Tie | Home team (tier) | Score | Away team (tier) | Att. |
| 1 | Corinthian (PD) | 3–0 | AFC Whyteleafe (FD) | 78 |
| 2 | Deal Town (PD) | 2–1 | Erith Town (PD) | 473 |

- Second leg

| Tie | Home team (tier) | Score | Away team (tier) | Att. |
| 1 | AFC Whyteleafe (FD) | 2–2 (agg. 2–5) | Corinthian (PD) | |
| 2 | Erith Town (PD) | 4–2 (agg 5–4) | Deal Town (PD) | 171 |

=== Final ===
| 29 March 2024 | Corinthian (PD) | 1–1 (3–5 p) | Erith Town (PD) | Gillingham |
| 13:00 GMT | Hagan 30' | Report | Dyer 85' (pen.) | Stadium: Star Meadow; Attendance: 452 |

sources:

- Final: "SCEFL Challenge Cup 2023/24 Final". SCEFL.
- Other matches: "SCEFL Challenge Cup: 2023–24". SCEFL.

== Division One Cup ==
The 2023–24 SCEFL Division One Cup was contested by the sixteen clubs of Division One. This was a re-introduction of a cup competition for the league's second tier clubs, previously contested as the Reserves Division cup in the 2012–13 season.

The competition was organised with an initial phase comprising four groups of four teams who played on a home and away basis with the group winners progressing to the semi-finals. Lewisham Borough were the cup winners.

=== Group Stage ===
- Group A

| Pos | Team | Pld | W | D | L | GF | GA | GD | Pts | |
|---|---|---|---|---|---|---|---|---|---|---|
| 1 | Lewisham Borough | 6 | 4 | 1 | 1 | 12 | 7 | +5 | 13 | Progressed to semi-finals |
| 2 | Tooting Bec | 6 | 3 | 0 | 3 | 8 | 10 | −2 | 9 | |
| 3 | Croydon | 6 | 2 | 2 | 2 | 10 | 6 | +4 | 8 | |
| 4 | AFC Whyteleafe | 6 | 1 | 1 | 4 | 7 | 14 | −7 | 4 | |

Source: "Division One Cup – 2023/24 Season". SCEFL.
Rules for classification: 1) points; 2) goal difference; 3) number of goals scored.

| Home \ Away | WHY | CRO | LEW | TOO |
|---|---|---|---|---|
| AFC Whyteleafe | — | 1–1 | 3–4 | 0–2 |
| Croydon | 0–2 | — | 0–0 | 3–0 |
| Lewisham Borough | 3–0 | 3–2 | — | 2–0 |
| Tooting Bec | 4–1 | 0–4 | 2–0 | — |

Source: "Division One Cup – 2023/24 Season". SCEFL.
Legend: Blue = home team win; Yellow = draw; Red = away team win.
- Group B

| Pos | Team | Pld | W | D | L | GF | GA | GD | Pts | |
|---|---|---|---|---|---|---|---|---|---|---|
| 1 | Meridian VP | 6 | 5 | 1 | 0 | 15 | 5 | +10 | 16 | Progressed to semi-finals |
| 2 | Bridon Ropes | 6 | 3 | 1 | 2 | 13 | 7 | +6 | 10 | |
| 3 | Forest Hill Park | 6 | 1 | 3 | 2 | 9 | 11 | −2 | 6 | |
| 4 | SC Thamesmead | 6 | 0 | 1 | 5 | 7 | 21 | −14 | 1 | |

Source: "Division One Cup – 2023/24 Season". SCEFL.
Rules for classification: 1) points; 2) goal difference; 3) number of goals scored.

| Home \ Away | BRI | FHP | MER | SCT |
|---|---|---|---|---|
| Bridon Ropes | — | 2–1 | 1–2 | 6–1 |
| Forest Hill Park | 0–0 | — | 0–3 | 2–0 |
| Meridian VP | 3–0 | 2–2 | — | 3–2 |
| SC Thamesmead | 0–4 | 4–4 | 0–2 | — |

Source: "Division One Cup – 2023/24 Season". SCEFL.
Legend: Blue = home team win; Yellow = draw; Red = away team win.
- Group C

| Pos | Team | Pld | W | D | L | GF | GA | GD | Pts | |
|---|---|---|---|---|---|---|---|---|---|---|
| 1 | Larkfield & New Hythe Wanderers | 6 | 4 | 1 | 1 | 17 | 7 | +10 | 13 | Progressed to semi-finals |
| 2 | K Sports | 6 | 3 | 0 | 3 | 8 | 16 | −8 | 9 | |
| 3 | Greenways | 6 | 2 | 1 | 3 | 7 | 9 | −2 | 7 | |
| 4 | FC Elmstead | 6 | 2 | 0 | 4 | 8 | 8 | 0 | 6 | |

Source: "Division One Cup – 2023/24 Season". SCEFL.
Rules for classification: 1) points; 2) goal difference; 3) number of goals scored.

| Home \ Away | ELM | GRE | KSP | LAR |
|---|---|---|---|---|
| FC Elmstead | — | x–W (Note: Walkover, win for Greenways) | x–W (Note: Walkover, win for K Sports) | 1–2 |
| Greenways | 3–2 | — | 0–1 | 1–2 |
| K Sports | 2–3 | 3–2 | — | 2–5 |
| Larkfield & New Hythe Wanderers | 1–2 | 1–1 | 6–0 | — |

Source: "Division One Cup – 2023/24 Season". SCEFL.
Legend: Blue = home team win; Yellow = draw; Red = away team win.
- Group D

| Pos | Team | Pld | W | D | L | GF | GA | GD | Pts | |
|---|---|---|---|---|---|---|---|---|---|---|
| 1 | Faversham Strike Force | 6 | 2 | 3 | 1 | 12 | 10 | +2 | 9 | Progressed to semi-finals |
| 2 | Canterbury City | 6 | 2 | 2 | 2 | 9 | 9 | 0 | 8 | |
| 3 | Staplehurst Monarchs | 6 | 1 | 4 | 1 | 10 | 10 | 0 | 7 | |
| 4 | Rochester United | 6 | 2 | 1 | 3 | 10 | 12 | −2 | 7 | |

Source: "Division One Cup – 2023/24 Season". SCEFL.
Rules for classification: 1) points; 2) goal difference; 3) number of goals scored.

| Home \ Away | CAN | FAV | ROC | STM |
|---|---|---|---|---|
| Canterbury City | — | 1–1 | 4–0 | 1–0 |
| Faversham Strike Force | 3–1 | — | 4–2 | 2–2 |
| Rochester United | 3–0 | 2–0 | — | 2–2 |
| Staplehurst Monarchs | 2–2 | 2–2 | 2–1 | — |

Source: "Division One Cup – 2023/24 Season". SCEFL.
Legend: Blue = home team win; Yellow = draw; Red = away team win.

=== Semi-finals ===
| Home team | Score | Away team |
| Meridian VP | 0–4 | Larkfield & New Hythe Wanderers |
| Lewisham Borough | 3–1 | Faversham Strike Force |

=== Final ===
| Team 1 | Score | Team 2 |
| Larkfield & New Hythe Wanderers | 2–3 | Lewisham Borough |

Source: "Division One Cup – 2023/24 Season". SCEFL.
