= 2025–26 Southern Counties East Football League =

The 2025–26 Southern Counties East Football League season was the 60th in the history of the Southern Counties East Football League (known for sponsorship reasons for the second consecutive season as the Presence & Co. Southern Counties East League). The league comprised two divisions, the Premier Division and the First Division, at levels 9 and 10 respectively of the English football league system (Step 5 and 6 respectively of the National League System).

== Premier Division ==
Southern Counties East Football League Premier Division
- Season: 2025–26
- Teams: 19
- Champions: Whitstable Town
- Promoted: Whitstable Town; Punjab United
- Relegated: Stansfeld; Hythe Town
- Matches: 342
- Goals: 1,186 (3.47 per match)
- Top goalscorer: (England) Jamie Philpot (Chislehurst Glebe) (24 goals)
- Average attendance: 185

Four clubs had left the division after the previous season:

- Faversham Town, promoted as champions to the Isthmian League South East Division
- Lordswood, relegated to the First Division
- Lydd Town, relegated to the First Division
- VCD Athletic, promoted as promotion play-off winners to the Isthmian League South East Division

The 2025–26 Premier Division club allocations from the FA Leagues Committee (subject to appeal) were announced on 15 May 2025 and was adopted at the league's AGM on 19 June 2025. The division comprised nineteen clubs, sixteen had been members the previous season and they were joined by three additional clubs:

- Faversham Strike Force – Promoted as champions from the First Division
- Hythe Town – Relegated from the Isthmian League South East Division
- Phoenix Sports – Relegated from the Isthmian League South East Division.

Prior to the season Glebe were renamed Chislehurst Glebe.

At the end of the season champions Whitstable Town and promotion play-off winners Punjab United (who had finished fifth in the division) were promoted to the Isthmian League South East Division. Both Hythe Town and Stansfeld were relegated to the First Division; for Hythe Town it was their second relegation in successive seasons.

=== League table ===
Pos	Team	Pld	W	D	L	GF	GA	GD	Pts	Promotion, qualification or relegation
1	Whitstable Town (C, P)	36	27	6	3	87	37	+50	87	Promoted to the Isthmian League South East Division
2	Fisher	36	20	8	8	82	40	+42	68	Qualified for the play-offs
3	Rusthall	36	19	8	9	75	50	+25	65	Qualified for the play-offs
4	Larkfield & New Hythe Wanderers	36	18	9	9	74	39	+35	63	Qualified for the play-offs
5	Punjab United (O, P)	36	18	9	9	74	55	+19	63	Qualified for the play-offs
6	Bearsted	36	16	12	8	74	62	+12	60	
7	Hollands & Blair	36	18	3	15	48	50	−2	57	
8	Phoenix Sports	36	14	11	11	73	55	+18	53	
9	Sutton Athletic	36	14	11	11	55	52	+3	53	
10	Tunbridge Wells	36	14	6	16	58	62	−4	48	
11	Erith & Belvedere	36	13	7	16	52	56	−4	46	
12	Snodland Town	36	12	9	15	61	73	−12	45	
13	Faversham Strike Force	36	11	8	17	72	74	−2	41	
14	Corinthian	36	10	11	15	63	84	−21	41	
15	Holmesdale	36	12	5	19	55	86	−31	41	
16	Kennington	36	11	7	18	51	66	−15	40	
17	Chislehurst Glebe	36	10	9	17	54	67	−13	39	
18	Stansfeld (R)	36	5	6	25	39	77	−38	21	Relegated to the First Division
19	Hythe Town (R)	36	5	5	26	39	101	−62	20	Relegated to the First Division

Source: The FA Full-Time, Non League Matters
Rules for classification: 1) points; 2) goal difference; 3) number of goals scored; 4) number of matches won; 5) head-to-head results
(C) Champions; (O) Play-off winners; (P) Promoted; (R) Relegated

=== Results Table ===
Home \ Away	BEA	CHG	COR	E&B	FAV	FIS	H&B	HLM	HYT	KEN	LAR	PHO	PUN	RUS	SNO	STA	SUT	TUN	WHI
Bearsted		1–4	4–1	4–1	3–2	2–1	2–2	4–0	1–0	1–1	2–1	2–2	1–3	2–1	1–2	4–1	1–1	2–2	1–1
Chislehurst Glebe	3–3		2–1	1–1	1–5	1–1	1–0	1–2	1–2	5–1	5–2	2–3	1–2	1–2	1–1	3–1	3–3	0–0	0–2
Corinthian	1–1	1–1		2–4	4–1	3–1	1–2	3–1	0–3	0–3	0–3	1–1	1–4	2–2	2–1	4–4	2–2	2–2	1–1
Erith & Belvedere	0–2	1–2	0–2		4–1	2–3	2–0	1–1	3–1	2–1	0–1	3–2	1–4	0–1	2–3	1–0	1–1	2–0	0–1
Faversham Strike Force	1–4	2–2	2–5	1–2		3–3	2–1	4–1	1–0	4–0	0–1	3–2	2–3	1–0	2–2	4–1	1–2	3–3	1–2
Fisher	1–1	2–0	4–2	3–2	4–2		1–0	3–2	5–0	4–1	1–1	1–3	5–1	5–0	4–1	4–1	1–2	5–0	1–2
Hollands & Blair	0–2	2–0	2–4	1–0	2–1	1–0		1–3	1–0	3–0	1–0	1–0	2–0	2–1	2–2	3–0	1–2	2–0	1–3
Holmesdale	0–1	4–1	3–2	2–2	1–1	0–5	3–4		4–2	2–1	0–3	4–2	1–1	0–3	1–4	6–2	2–1	1–2	0–4
Hythe Town	2–3	0–2	3–1	0–3	0–9	0–2	0–1	1–1		0–2	1–3	0–4	3–3	2–3	4–0	0–0	0–4	0–3	1–2
Kennington	1–4	2–1	5–0	1–2	0–3	1–1	3–1	4–0	5–2		1–2	1–1	2–1	3–2	1–0	2–2	0–4	2–1	1–3
Larkfield & New Hythe Wanderers	5–0	3–0	2–3	1–1	1–2	0–0	7–0	5–0	4–0	1–0		1–2	3–4	1–1	5–2	3–0	3–0	2–1	1–2
Phoenix Sports	3–2	3–1	2–2	3–3	0–0	1–1	4–1	1–0	4–1	2–2	4–0		2–4	4–0	2–4	4–1	1–1	1–4	0–1
Punjab United	1–1	3–1	2–2	3–0	2–1	2–1	1–0	2–1	5–0	0–0	2–2	1–1		1–1	1–2	1–0	3–1	1–4	0–1
Rusthall	5–1	4–2	3–0	3–1	7–0	2–1	0–0	4–0	3–3	3–1	1–1	1–0	4–2		5–1	0–1	1–2	2–0	2–2
Snodland Town	2–2	2–1	4–0	0–0	4–2	0–0	0–3	3–2	7–2	2–2	0–0	1–5	1–1	0–2		1–3	0–1	2–3	1–5
Stansfeld	2–2	0–1	1–3	0–1	2–1	1–4	0–1	0–1	1–3	1–0	0–1	0–1	5–2	1–3	1–2		0–0	2–3	1–2
Sutton Athletic	2–3	1–1	1–2	0–1	1–1	0–1	2–1	3–4	2–2	1–0	2–2	3–2	0–3	1–1	2–1	1–0		0–1	4–1
Tunbridge Wells	3–2	1–2	1–1	3–2	2–2	0–2	0–2	0–2	5–0	3–0	0–2	1–0	0–4	1–2	3–1	2–1	1–2		1–2
Whitstable Town	4–2	3–0	6–2	2–1	2–1	0–1	3–1	5–0	3–1	2–1	1–1	1–1	2–1	5–0	0–2	3–3	4–0	4–2	

Source: FA Full-Time Grid
Legend: Blue = home team win; Yellow = draw; Red = away team win.
For upcoming matches, an "a" indicates there is an article about the rivalry between the two participants.

=== Promotion Play-offs ===
The 2025–26 Premier Division promotion play-offs, contested by the clubs that finished second to fifth position in the league table, were won by Punjab United who had been fifth-placed in the division.

Semi-finals
3	Rusthall	0	(5 p) (Note: Penalty shoot-out)
4	Larkfield & New Hythe Wanderers	0	(4 p)
2	Fisher	1
5	Punjab United	3

Final
3	Rusthall	1 (Note: After extra time played, score at 90 minutes: 0–0)	(3 p) (Note: Penalty shoot-out)
5	Punjab United	1	(4 p)

==== Semifinals ====
28 April 2026	Rusthall	0–0 (5-4 p)	Larkfield & New Hythe Wanderers	Rusthall
15:00 BST		Report		Stadium: The Jockey Farm Stadium, Nellington Road; Attendance: 403

28 April 2026	Fisher	1–3	Punjab United	Rotherhithe
15:00 BST	Kamara 53'	Report	Hopkins 9'; Byron 45+2'; Johnson-Cole 74'	Stadium: St Paul's Sports Ground; Attendance: 449

==== Final ====
4 May 2026	Rusthall	1–1 (a.e.t.) (3–4 p)	Punjab United	Rusthall
15:00 BST	Owoeye 101'	Report	Wayne Bushell 116'	Stadium: The Jockey Farm Stadium, Nellington Road; Attendance: 1444; Referee: Alex Gordon
	Penalties
	Owoeye (penalty missed); Bisset (penalty missed); Fares (penalty scored); Kirby (penalty scored); Reid (penalty scored); Powell-Downey (penalty missed)		Beeney (penalty scored); Bushell (penalty missed); Johnson-Cole (penalty scored); Edwards (penalty scored); Ottaway (penalty missed); Bryon (penalty scored)

=== Stadia and locations ===
Locations of the Premier Division clubs (Greater London)

Locations of the Premier Division clubs (Kent)

Club	Location	Stadium	Capacity
Bearsted	Otham	Honey Lane	1,000
Chislehurst Glebe	Chislehurst	Foxbury Avenue	1,200
Corinthian	Longfield	Gay Dawn Farm	2,000
Erith & Belvedere	Welling	Park View Road (groundshare with Welling United)	4,000
Faversham Strike Force	Faversham	The Belmont Ground (groundshare with Whitstable Town)	3,000
Fisher	Rotherhithe	St Paul's Sports Ground	2,500
Hollands & Blair	Gillingham	Star Meadow	1,000
Holmesdale	Bromley	Oakley Road	
Hythe Town	Hythe	Reachfields Stadium	3,000
Kennington	Kennington	The Homelands (groundshare with Ashford United)	3,200
Larkfield & New Hythe Wanderers	Larkfield	Larkfield & New Hythe Sports Club	3,000
Phoenix Sports	Barnehurst	Phoenix Sports Ground	2,000
Punjab United	Gravesend	Elite Venue	600
Rusthall	Rusthall	The Jockey Farm Stadium	1,500
Snodland Town	Snodland	Potyns Sports Ground	1,000
Stansfeld	Eltham	Badgers Sports Ground (groundshare with Cray Valley Paper Mills)	1,550
Sutton Athletic	Hextable	Lower Road	
Tunbridge Wells	Royal Tunbridge Wells	Culverden Stadium	3,750
Whitstable Town	Whitstable	The Belmont Ground	3,000

== First Division ==
Southern Counties East Football League First Division
- Season: 2025–26
- Teams: 18
- Champions: AFC Greenwich Borough
- Promoted: AFC Greenwich Borough; SE Dons
- Relegated: Chessington & Hook United
- Matches: 306
- Goals: 1,040 (3.4 per match)
- Top goalscorer: (England) Oghosa Williams (AFC Greenwich Borough) (34 goals)
- Average attendance: 101

Five clubs had left the division after the previous season:

- Canterbury City, took voluntary relegation to the Kent County League
- Clapton Community, transferred laterally on appeal to next season's allocation back to the Eastern Counties League Division One South (from where they had been transferred the previous season)
- Faversham Strike Force, promoted as champions to the Premier Division
- Soul Tower Hamlets, promotion play-off winners, moved laterally to the Essex Senior League
- Meridian VP, relegated to the Kent County League

The 2025–26 First Division club allocations from the FA Leagues Committee (subject to appeal) were announced on 15 May 2025. Subsequently Clapton Community were successful in their appeal to be transferred laterally back to the Eastern Counties League Division One South (from where they had been transferred the previous season). The revised constitution of the division was adopted at the league's AGM on 19 June 2025; it comprised eighteen clubs, thirteen had been members the previous season and they were joined by five additional clubs:

- AFC Greenwich Borough, a new club
- Banstead Athletic, transferred laterally from Southern Combination Division One
- Chessington & Hook United, transferred laterally from Southern Combination Division One
- Lordswood, relegated from the Premier Division
- Lydd Town, relegated from the Premier Division

At the end of the season champions AFC Greenwich Borough and promotion play-off winners SE Dons (who had finished second in the division) were promoted to the Premier Division. Only one club, Chessington & Hook United were relegated (to the Surrey Premier County League); both Lydd Town and, for a second successive season, Welling Town were reprieved from relegation,

=== League table ===
Pos	Team	Pld	W	D	L	GF	GA	GD	Pts	Promotion, qualification or relegation
1	AFC Greenwich Borough (C, P)	34	28	2	4	105	20	+85	86	Promoted to the Premier Division
2	SE Dons (O, P)	34	26	6	2	99	26	+73	84	Qualified for the play-offs
3	Rochester United	34	21	3	10	68	36	+32	66	Qualified for the play-offs
4	Lordswood	34	19	7	8	63	45	+18	64	Qualified for the play-offs
5	Croydon	34	18	7	9	75	44	+31	61	Qualified for the play-offs
6	Greenways	34	15	7	12	52	42	+10	52	
7	FC Elmstead	34	15	6	13	62	56	+6	51	
8	Staplehurst Monarchs	34	12	10	12	49	52	−3	46	
9	Sheppey Sports	34	12	8	14	66	74	−8	44	
10	Sporting Club Thamesmead	34	10	12	12	55	55	0	42	
11	Halls Athletic	34	12	4	18	53	64	−11	40	
12	Bridon Ropes	34	10	9	15	47	71	−24	39	
13	Banstead Athletic	34	11	6	17	40	81	−41	39	
14	Tooting Bec	34	8	11	15	44	44	0	35	
15	Lewisham Borough	34	9	7	18	34	53	−19	34	
16	Lydd Town	34	8	7	19	51	97	−46	31	Reprieved from relegation
17	Welling Town	34	5	6	23	32	83	−51	21	Reprieved from relegation
18	Chessington & Hook United (R)	34	5	6	23	44	96	−52	21	Relegated to the Surrey Premier County League Premier Division

Source: The FA Full-Time; Non League Matters
Rules for classification: 1) points; 2) goal difference; 3) number of goals scored; 4) number of matches won; 5) head-to-head results
(C) Champions; (O) Play-off winners; (P) Promoted; (R) Relegated

=== Results Table ===
Home \ Away	AGB	BAN	BRI	CHE	CRO	ELM	GWY	HAL	LEW	LOR	LYD	ROC	SCT	SED	SHE	STM	TOO	WEL
AFC Greenwich Borough		5–0	5–0	1–1	1–2	5–1	3–0	2–1	2–0	3–0	4–0	1–3	2–1	3–1	3–1	1–1	2–0	7–0
Banstead Athletic	0–8		2–3	2–3	1–0	3–2	1–3	0–6	1–0	2–4	1–1	1–0	3–3	1–4	0–2	1–0	1–0	2–0
Bridon Ropes	0–5	2–0		2–1	1–1	0–3	1–1	1–2	2–2	1–2	2–1	1–3	3–2	0–5	0–2	2–2	1–5	4–3
Chessington & Hook United	1–6	1–3	3–0		1–3	3–3	1–1	2–5	2–3	0–3	3–3	0–4	2–6	0–3	3–1	0–0	0–2	4–1
Croydon	0–4	4–0	0–0	11–0		1–3	1–1	6–0	1–1	3–2	6–1	1–2	4–2	0–1	3–2	0–1	0–3	1–1
FC Elmstead	0–1	1–1	1–1	2–1	2–4		1–4	2–1	2–0	1–2	5–0	1–2	4–2	2–3	3–1	2–1	0–3	3–0
Greenways	1–2	7–1	0–1	1–0	1–1	4–1		1–0	3–1	1–2	2–0	0–1	1–1	0–1	2–3	0–3	1–0	2–1
Halls Athletic	2–4	2–2	0–3	2–1	0–2	0–1	0–2		4–2	0–3	3–1	2–0	3–3	0–3	2–1	1–5	0–1	0–1
Lewisham Borough	0–2	1–0	0–2	1–0	1–2	0–1	1–1	0–2		3–0	1–1	1–5	0–1	0–3	1–2	3–0	2–1	0–1
Lordswood	0–2	4–1	1–1	3–0	1–2	2–2	2–0	2–0	4–1		0–1	0–9	1–1	1–1	1–1	3–0	1–1	3–2
Lydd Town	0–4	1–2	3–4	2–1	1–4	2–4	2–1	2–2	3–1	2–2		3–3	0–5	1–3	3–1	1–2	0–5	4–1
Rochester United	0–2	3–0	4–3	2–1	1–0	1–0	4–2	1–2	0–2	0–1	2–0		1–2	2–1	1–2	2–0	2–1	3–0
Sporting Club Thamesmead	2–0	0–1	2–2	1–0	2–2	1–4	1–2	3–1	1–1	0–2	2–3	1–0		0–3	2–2	3–0	1–0	1–1
SE Dons	2–1	4–1	3–1	7–0	4–1	2–1	3–0	4–0	1–1	2–1	6–1	0–0	1–1		4–2	1–1	1–0	3–2
Sheppey Sports	0–8	2–0	3–1	8–4	1–2	1–1	0–3	2–2	0–2	0–4	8–1	4–0	0–0	0–7		2–4	1–1	4–2
Staplehurst Monarchs	0–2	3–3	1–0	2–1	0–1	3–0	2–3	1–0	3–1	1–2	3–3	1–1	2–0	0–5	1–1		1–1	3–1
Tooting Bec	0–1	2–2	0–0	2–2	1–4	1–1	0–0	0–3	0–1	1–2	2–4	0–1	1–1	1–1	1–4	4–1		2–0
Welling Town	0–3	0–1	3–2	0–2	1–2	0–2	0–1	0–5	0–0	0–2	2–0	0–5	3–1	1–6	2–2	1–1	2–2	

Source: FA Full-Time Grid; FWP SCEFL Results
Legend: Blue = home team win; Yellow = draw; Red = away team win.
For upcoming matches, an "a" indicates there is an article about the rivalry between the two participants.

=== Promotion Play-offs ===
The 2025–26 First Division promotion play-offs, contested by the clubs that finished second to fifth position in the league table, were won by SE Dons who had been runners-up in the division.

Semi-finals
2	SE Dons	2
5	Croydon	0
3	Rochester United	4
4	Lordswood	0

Final
2	SE Dons	4
3	Rochester United	2

==== Semifinals ====
27 April 2026	SE Dons	2–0	Croydon	Chatham
19:45 BST	Coker 37', 55'	Report		Stadium: The Bauvill Stadium; Attendance: 895

28 April 2026	Rochester United	4–0	Lordswood	Strood
19:45 BST	Reilly 59', 63'; Payne 77'; Medley 90+1'	Report		Stadium: Rochester United Sports Ground; Attendance: 423

==== Final ====
2 May 2026	SE Dons	4–2	Rochester United	Chatham
15:00 BST	Watson 5'; Akinwande 30'; Coker 54', 88'	Report	Lockyer 11', 45+2'	Stadium: The Bauvill Stadium; Attendance: 1,487; Referee: Jerahl Hall

=== Stadia and locations ===
Locations of the First Division clubs (Greater London)

Locations of the First Division clubs (Kent)

Club	Location	Stadium	Capacity
AFC Greenwich Borough	Greenwich	Oakley Road (groundshare with Holmesdale)	
Banstead Athletic	Tadworth	Merland Rise	1,500
Bridon Ropes	Charlton	Meridian Sports & Social Club	
Chessington & Hook United	Chessington	Chalky Lane	3,000
Croydon	Croydon	Croydon Arena	8,000
FC Elmstead	Hextable	Lower Road (groundshare with Sutton Athletic)	
Greenways	Gravesend	Rochester United Sports Ground (groundshare with Rochester United)	1,000
Halls Athletic	Dartford	Princes Park (groundshare with Dartford)	4,100
Lewisham Borough	Catford	Ladywell Arena	
Lordswood	Lordswoood	Martyn Grove	600
Lydd Town	Lydd	The Lindsey Field	1,000
Rochester United	Strood	Rochester United Sports Ground	1,000
SE Dons	Chatham	The Bauvill Stadium (groundshare with Chatham Town)	5,000
Sheppey Sports	Isle of Sheppey	Holm Park (groundshare with Sheppey United)	1,530
Sporting Club Thamesmead	Thamesmead	Bayliss Avenue (groundshare with Erith Town)	800
Staplehurst Monarchs	Staplehurst	Jubilee Sports Ground	1,000
Tooting Bec	Tooting Bec	High Road (groundshare with Chipstead)	2,000
Welling Town	Welling	Erith Leisure Centre	

== League Challenge Cup ==
The 2025–26 SCEFL Challenge Cup (known for sponsorship reasons as the Presence & Co. SCEFL Challenge Cup) was a knock-out competition contested by all 37 clubs from both the Premier and First divisions (indicated by '(PD)' and '(FD)' respectively in the results listings below). The final, played at Cray Wanderers F.C., was won by Rusthall who defeated Bearsted 4–0.

=== First round ===
The first round was contested by ten teams over five ties with the remaining 27 teams receiving a bye to the next round.

Tie	Home team (division)	Score	Away team (division)
1	Chislehurst Glebe (PD)	3–4	Erith & Belvedere (PD)
2	Faversham Strike Force (PD)	4–2	Sheppey Sports (FD)
3	Fisher (PD)	4–0	Bridon Ropes (FD)
4	Halls Athletic (FD)	0–0 (4–3 p)	Sutton Athletic (PD)
5	Punjab United (PD)	0–3	Holmesdale (PD)

=== Second round ===
The second round comprised sixteen ties featuring the 32 teams remaining in the competition.

Tie	Home team (division)	Score	Away team (division)
1	AFC Greenwich Borough (FD)	2–0	Holmesdale (PD)
2	Banstead Athletic (FD)	0–2	Tunbridge Wells (PD)
3	Chessington & Hook United (FD)	1–0	Croydon (FD)
4	Corinthian (PD)	3–3 (1–3 p)	Snodland Town (PD)
5	Faversham Strike Force (PD)	2–1	Rochester United (FD)
6	Fisher (PD)	6–0	Welling Town (FD)
7	Greenways (FD)	0–2	FC Elmstead (FD)
8	Halls Athletic (FD)	0–2	Stansfeld (PD)
9	Hollands & Blair (PD)	3–0	Lydd Town (FD)
10	Kennington (PD)	2–3	SE Dons (FD)
11	Larkfield & New Hythe Wanderers (PD)	2–0	Lordswood (FD)
12	Lewisham Borough (FD)	1–1 (1–4 p)	Phoenix Sports (PD)
13	Sporting Club Thamesmead (FD)	3–4	Rusthall (PD)
14	Staplehurst Monarchs (FD)	0–4	Hythe Town (PD)
15	Tooting Bec (FD)	0–3	Erith & Belvedere (PD)
16	Whitstable Town (PD)	2–3	Bearsted (PD)

=== Third round ===
The third round was contested by the 16 teams remaining in the competition: twelve from the Premier Division and four from the First Division.

Tie	Home team (division)	Score	Away team (division)
1	Bearsted (PD)	1–1 (4–2 p)	Hollands & Blair (PD)
2	Erith & Belvedere (PD)	3–3 (2–4 p)	Tunbridge Wells (PD)
3	FC Elmstead (FD)	0–2	AFC Greenwich Borough (FD)
4	Hythe Town (PD)	0–0 (9–8 p)	Snodland Town (PD)
5	Larkfield & New Hythe Wanderers (PD)	2–2 (4–1 p)	Faversham Strike Force (PD)
6	Rusthall (PD)	6–0	Chessington & Hook United (FD)
7	SE Dons (FD)	1–4	Fisher (PD)
8	Stansfeld (PD)	2–3	Phoenix Sports (PD)

=== Quarter-finals ===
The eight teams in the quarter-finals included seven from the Premier Division and one from the First Division.

Tie	Home team (division)	Score	Away team (division)
1	AFC Greenwich Borough (FD)	3–2	Phoenix Sports (PD)
2	Bearsted (PD)	3–2	Hythe Town (PD)
3	Larkfield & New Hythe Wanderers (PD)	3–1	Fisher (PD)
4	Rusthall (PD)	4–3	Tunbridge Wells (PD)

=== Semi-finals ===
Three Premier Division and one First Division clubs contested the semi-finals: two Premier Division clubs advanced to the final.

Tie	Home team (division)	Score	Away team (division)
1	AFC Greenwich Borough (FD)	3–4	Bearsted (PD)
2	Larkfield & New Hythe Wanderers (PD)	1–2	Rusthall (PD)

=== Final ===
3 April 2026	Bearsted (PD)	0–4	Rusthall (PD)	Chislehurst
13:00 BST			Josh Reid 28'; Josh Reid 70'; Charlie Clover 78'; Louie Clarke 90'	Stadium: Cray Wanderers F.C. (Flamingo Park); Attendance: 735; Referee: Byron Beard

source: "Presence & Co. SCEFL Challenge Cup: 2025–26". SCEFL.

== Division One Cup ==
The 2025–26 SCEFL Division One Cup was a supplementary knock-out competition for the eighteen clubs of the First Division. The final, played at Cray Wanderers F.C., was won by Tooting Bec who defeated Lordswood 5–4 in a penalty shoot-out after the match finished 2–2 after 90 minutes.

=== First round ===
Four clubs to compete in two first round ties, with byes for the other 14 clubs.

Tie	Home team	Score	Away team
1	Lewisham Borough	3–1	AFC Greenwich Borough
2	Lordswood	1–1 (4–3 p)	Lydd Town

=== Second round ===
Sixteen clubs to compete in eight second round ties.

Tie	Home team	Score	Away team
1	Banstead Athletic	0–1	Chessington & Hook United
2	Bridon Ropes	2–0	Welling Town
3	Croydon	0–1	Tooting Bec
4	FC Elmstead	0–2	Halls Athletic
5	Lewisham Borough	2–1	Sporting Club Thamesmead
6	Lordswood	4–2	SE Dons
7	Rochester United	0–2	Greenways
8	Sheppey Sports	0–5	Staplehurst Monarchs

=== Quarter-finals ===
Tie	Home team	Score	Away team
1	Chessington & Hook United	0–1	Lewisham Borough
2	Lordswood	3–3 (4–3 p)	Halls Athletic
3	Staplehurst Monarchs	1–1 (4–3 p)	Greenways
4	Tooting Bec	3–0	Bridon Ropes

=== Semi-finals ===
Tie	Home team	Score	Away team
1	Lewisham Borough	1–2	Tooting Bec
2	Lordswood	2–0	Staplehurst Monarchs

=== Final ===
9 May 2026	Lordswood	2–2 (4–5 p)	Tooting Bec	Chislehurst
13:00 BST	Meseorisa 45+3'; Martin (o.g.) 60'	Report	Taylor-Kamara 3'; Harnett-Balkwill 90+2'	Stadium: Cray Wanderers F.C. (Flamingo Park); Attendance: 432; Referee: Darren Kempson
	Penalties
	Murray (penalty scored); Tristram (penalty missed); Meseorisa (penalty scored); Williams (penalty scored); Babbington (penalty scored); Miles (penalty missed)		Waite (penalty scored); Taylor-Kamara (penalty scored); Davies (penalty scored); Negassi (penalty scored); Tedros (penalty missed); Martin (penalty scored)

source: "SCEFL Division One Cup: 2025–26". SCEFL.
