= A.F.C. Greenwich Borough =

English football club

Coordinates: 51°26′36.52″N 0°3′52.65″E

AFC Greenwich Borough
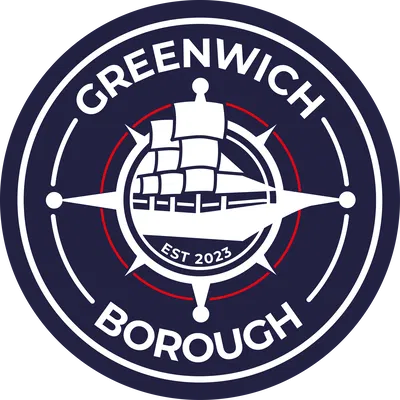
- Full name: A.F.C. Greenwich Borough
- Founded: 2023
- Ground: Emico Stadium, Eltham
- Chairman: Paul Whitehead
- Manager: Tony Russell
- League: Southern Counties East League Premier Division
- Website: greenwichborough.com

A.F.C. Greenwich Borough is an English football club based in Greenwich, London who play in the Southern Counties East Football League Premier Division. The club was founded in 2023. Despite its name, AFC Greenwich Borough have no affiliation to the original Greenwich Borough who played up until their liquidation in 2020.

== History ==
AFC Greenwich Borough was founded in 2023, originally as a veterans team. In 2025, the club took over all operations of the Welling United academy, and installed a men's first team, who entered the Southern Counties East League Division One for the 2025–26 season.

The club's first competitive fixture was a 1–1 home draw against Chessington & Hook United. Their first win would come a week later, in 3–1 home win over Sheppey Sports. Their first season ended in success, as the club secured the Division One title on the final day of the season, earning promotion to the Premier Division. Borough also won the London Senior Trophy, defeating Wimbledon Casuals 2–0 in the final.

== Ground ==
Upon entering the Southern Counties East Football League, the club played at Oakley Road, in Bromley, groundsharing with Holmesdale, with all other teams operated by the club playing at Footscray Playing Fields, in Eltham.

In November 2026, AFC Greenwich Borough moved to the Emico Stadium. On 14 November 2026, in front of a crowd of 1,091, the club played their first game at the ground, beating Phoenix Sports 3–2.

== Records ==
- Best FA Cup performance: Second qualifying round, 2026–27
- Best FA Vase performance: Third round, 2026–27

== Honours ==
League

- Southern Counties East Football League
  - Division One Champions: 2025–26

Cup

- London Senior Trophy
  - Champions: 2025–26
