= Soul Tower Hamlets F.C. =

Association football club in England

Coordinates: 51.458944°N 0.170378°E

SOUL Tower Hamlets FC
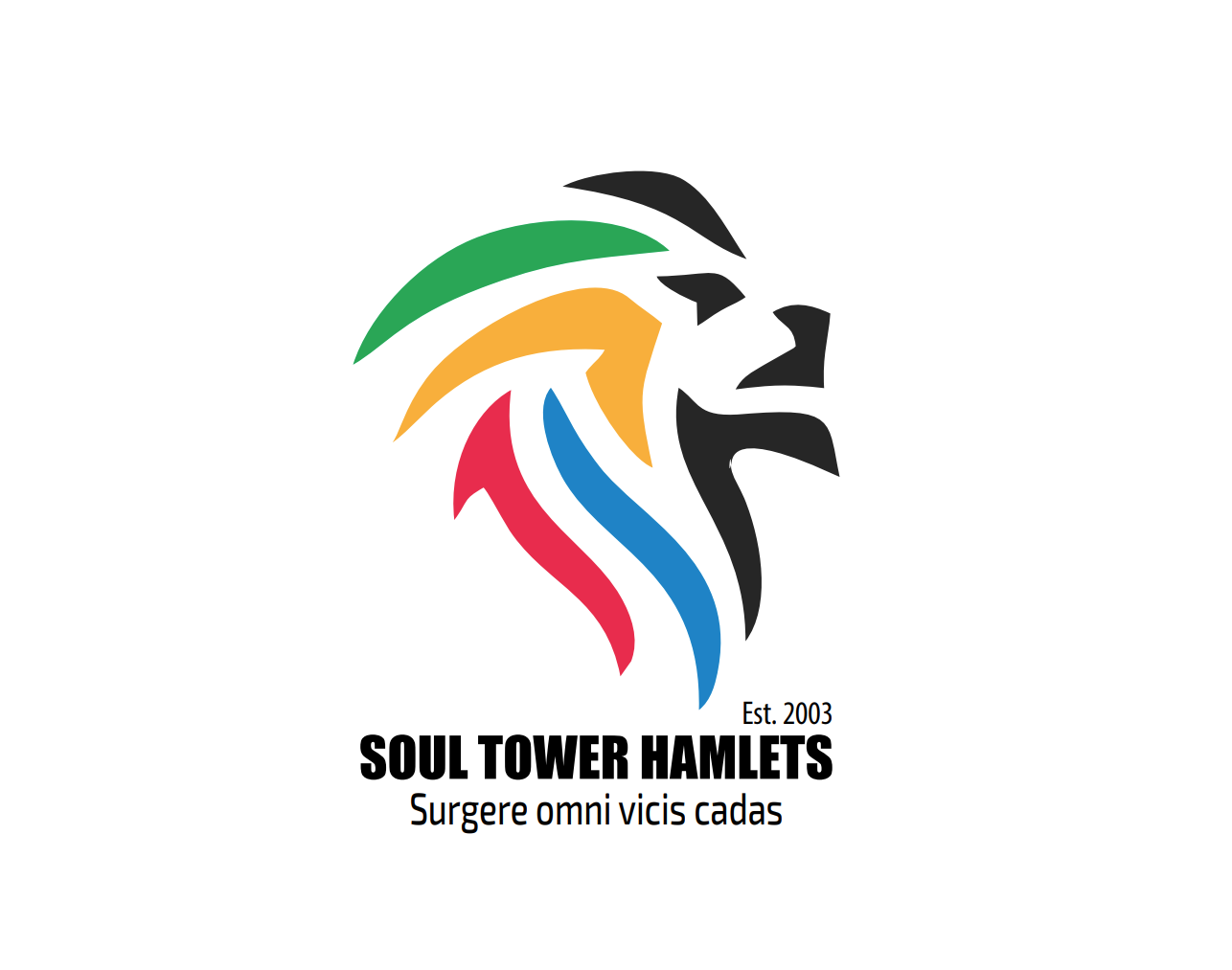
- Full name: SOUL Tower Hamlets Football Club
- Founded: 2000; 26 years ago, as Bethnal Green United; 2013; 13 years ago, as Tower Hamlets
- Ground: Mile End Stadium
- Capacity: 2,000
- Chairman: Tarik Khan
- Manager: Shipon Miah and Zaheen Kahn
- League: Essex Senior League
- 2025–26: Essex Senior League, 2nd of 20
- Website: www.soulth.co.uk
Home colours	Away colours

SOUL Tower Hamlets Football Club is a football club based in the London Borough of Tower Hamlets. They are currently members of the Essex Senior League and play home games at the Mile End Stadium.

== History ==
SOUL Tower Hamlets FC was established in 2000 by Mohammed Nurul Hoque and Akhtar Ahmed as a community club then named as Bethnal Green United. The club played in several leagues, including the Canary Wharf Summer League, the Inner London Football League and the London Intermediate League, before joining the Middlesex County League. They were granted Senior status after winning the league's Premier Division in 2009 and were promoted to the Essex Senior League. In the 2009–10 season, they finished fifth in the ESL and won both cups operated by the Essex Senior League, beating Burnham Ramblers 4–1 in the final of the Gordon Brasted Memorial Trophy.

In 2013, the club was renamed to Tower Hamlets. During the 1990s, an unrelated club, also by the name of Tower Hamlets, played at the Mile End Stadium. At the end of the 2019–20 season, the club were transferred to the Premier Division of the Southern Counties East League after moving to Phoenix Sports' ground in Barnehurst from the Mile End Stadium. The 2021–22 season saw Tower Hamlets finish bottom of the league and suffer relegation to step 6 and were moved back to the Eastern Counties League after moving back to the Mile End Stadium. Hamlets finished 14th in the 2022-23 season and 15th in the following year, however they were once again moved to the Southern Counties East League for the 2024–25 season, along with Clapton FC and Clapton CFC, despite still playing at Mile End. The 2025-2026 season SOUL Tower Hamlets have been promoted back into the Essex Senior League (Step 5). The team has a new management team in place, with experienced Terry Spillane and John field taking the reign after the interim manager Shipon Miah and John Pike stepped down at the end of the season.

Ahead of the 2024–25 season, the club merged with Soul Football Club, a community organisation running for over 20 years and was renamed as SOUL Tower Hamlets FC. In May 2025, the club were promoted to step five, defeating Forest Hill Park on penalties to win the play-offs under Shipon Miah and John Pike.

== Ground ==
In 2008, the club moved from Meath Gardens in Bethnal Green to the Mile End Stadium. In 2020, Tower Hamlets moved to the Phoenix Sports Ground in Barnehurst. In 2022, the club moved back to the Mile End Stadium.

== Records ==
- Best FA Cup performance: Second qualifying round, 2025–26
- Best FA Vase performance: Fifth round, 2011–12
- Record attendance: 468 vs Clapton, Essex Senior League, 25 August 2017

== See also ==
The original Bethnal Green United badge.

- Football in London
