= Halls Athletic F.C. =

Association football club in England

Coordinates: 51.4372°N 0.2308°E

Halls Athletic
- Full name: Halls Athletic Football Club
- Founded: 1919
- Ground: Princes Park, Dartford, Kent
- Chairman: Steve Vanstone
- Manager: George Michaelas
- League: Southern Counties East League Division One
- 2025–26: Southern Counties East League Division One, 11th of 18
- Website: https://x.com/HAFCOfficial

Halls Athletic Football Club is an English football club based in Dartford, Kent. The club was founded in 1919 and is affiliated with the Kent County Football Association. The club currently competes in the Southern Counties East League Division One.

== History ==
Halls Athletic has a long-standing presence in grassroots football since its establishment in 1919.

The club won promotion from the Kent County Football League Division 2 West in 2002–03 after finishing 2nd place, moving up to the Division 1 West. They finished bottom of the table in 2005-06 but weren't relegated. That fate happened a year later where they finished 12th in the division. In 2012–13, the club were once again promoted from the Division 2 West after a 4th-placed finish, and in 2021-22 they gained promotion to the Premier Division for the first time after finishing runner up to Tenterden Town.

Following 2 seasons in the Premier Division, which included a 5th-placed finish in their first season and then winning the league in 2023–24, the club achieved promotion to Division One of the Southern Counties East Football League for the 2024–25 season. In the same season, Halls also finished runners up in the Kent Intermediate Challenge Shield, drawing 1–1 with league rivals Minster, before losing 3–1 on penalties. Halls won their first game at Step 6, defeating Sheppey Sports 4–3 away from home.

== Ground ==
During the club's first season, they played at the Erith Leisure Centre Community Stadium.

In June 2025, the club announced that they had entered a groundshare agreement with Dartford, playing at Princes Park for the 2025–26 season.

== Colours ==
- Home Kit: Sky blue shirts, navy blue shorts, and sky blue socks
- Away Kit: Grey shirts, grey shorts, and grey socks
- Goalkeeper (Home): Navy blue and black
- Goalkeeper (Away): Orange

== Management and staff ==
- Chairman: Steve Vanstone
- Club Secretary: Bradley Marshall
- First Team Secretary: Chris Michaelas
- Programme Editor: Chris Michaelas
- First Team Manager: George Michaelas

== Honours ==
- League
  - Kent County League Premier Division
    - Champions: 2023–24
- Cup
  - Kent Intermediate Challenge Shield
    - Runners Up: 2023-24

== See also ==
- Southern Counties East Football League
- Kent County Football Association
