= Larkfield & New Hythe Wanderers F.C. =

Coordinates: 51°18′22″N 0°26′23″E

Larkfield & New Hythe FC
- Full name: Larkfield & New Hythe Football Club
- Nickname: The Larks
- Founded: 1961; 65 years ago
- Ground: Larkfield & New Hythe Sports Club, New Hythe
- Capacity: 3,000
- Chairman: John Michel
- Manager: Tony Reid
- League: Southern Counties East League Premier Division
- 2025–26: Southern Counties East League Premier Division, 4th of 19
Home colours

Larkfield & New Hythe Wanderers Football Club is a football club based in New Hythe, England. They are currently members of the Southern Counties East League Premier Division and play at Larkfield & New Hythe Sports Club.

== History ==
Larkfield & New Hythe Wanderers were founded in 1961 and Larkfield Boys were formed in 1976 as a youth football club. In 1998 the senior team entered the Kent County League. During the club's tenure in the Kent County League, the club won promotion to the Division One West and East on two occasions, in 2007 and 2009 respectively.

In 2021, the club was admitted into the Southern Counties East League Division One. Larkfield & New Hythe entered the FA Vase for the first time in 2021–22. Having been defeated in the 2022–23 Division One play-off final, the club were promoted through the play-offs the following season defeating Staplehurst Monarchs 1-0.

Larkfield & New Hythe entered the FA Cup for the first time in 2024-25 and won their first match 2–1 against Kennington. That same season also saw the club reach their first senior cup final, when they faced Whitstable Town in the final of the Kent Senior Trophy. Larkfield overcame Whitstable 3-2 at Maidstone United's Gallagher Stadium to claim their first senior cup honour.

== Ground ==
The club currently play at Larkfield & New Hythe Sports Club in New Hythe.

== Club honours ==
- Southern Counties East Football League
  - First Division play-off winners: 2023–24
- Kent Senior Trophy
  - Winners: 2024-25

== Club records ==
- Best FA Cup performance: First qualifying round replay (2024–25)
- Best FA Vase performance: Third round proper (2022–23, 2026–27)
- Best Kent Senior Trophy performance: Winners (2024-25)
