= VCD Athletic F.C. =

Association football club in England

Coordinates: 51°27′21.41″N 0°10′09.94″E

VCD Athletic
- Full name: Vickers, Crayford & Dartford Athletic Football Club
- Nickname: The Vickers
- Founded: 1916; 110 years ago (as Vickers (Erith))
- Dissolved: 2026
- Ground: The Oakwood; Old Road; Crayford
- Capacity: 1,180
- Chairman: Gary Rump
- Manager: Danny Joy and Ross Baker
- 2025–26: Isthmian League South East Division, 21st of 22 (relegated)
Home colours	Away colours

VCD Athletic Football Club (short for Vickers, Crayford & Dartford Athletic Football Club) was a semi-professional football club based in Crayford in south-east London, England. The club was founded in 1916, during the First World War, as a company team by employees of the now defunct Vickers armaments factory in Crayford. The club disbanded at the end of the 2025–26 season after finishing second-bottom of the Isthmian League South East Division.

== History ==
VCD Athletic was formed in 1916 by workers at the Vickers armaments factory at Crayford, originally as Vickers (Erith) FC, and joined the original Kent League upon the resumption of play after World War I. In their first season they had the advantage of picking a number of Arsenal players who were completing their war service at the works.

In 1921 the club joined the Dartford and District League, before joining the newly formed Kent Amateur League in 1925, where they were to remain for over 70 years. They won the championship in 1953 and 1964 but then spent the next twenty years yo-yoing erratically between Division One and Division Two. In 1984 they were promoted back to Division One for the final time, and just one year later won the Championship and joined the restructured Premier Division of what was now called the Kent County League.

In 1993 Martin Ford took the reign as VCD manager. In 1996–97 season VCD won the Premier Division title by a record 15 points, they then successfully applied for senior status, and were accepted into the Kent League. They showed an improvement over the previous season for their first five seasons at this level, culminating in a second-place finish in 2002–03 when, after leading the table for most of the season, they narrowly lost out on the championship on goal difference. Despite a mass exodus of players after this, the club has continued to do well and consistently finish in the league's top half dozen. They also appeared in three consecutive League Cup finals, winning the trophy in 1999–2000 with a 4–0 victory over Faversham Town. After 14 years at VCD Ford resigned.

In the 2007–08 season team captain Paul Foley stepped up to become manager and guided the club to 2nd place in the Kent League before going one better in the 2008–09 season securing the league title and Kent Senior Trophy in only his second season in charge.

In the 2009–10 season the club then joined the Isthmian League in Division One North, finishing in 8th place, however the club was demoted at the end of the season back to the Kent league. The reason the club was demoted was because their ground was not up to the desired standard of the Isthmian league, as the hard path around the pitch was 1 metre wide and not 2 metres. This was met with some controversy as the club had believed that the work were on course to complete this work by the original stated deadline, but then the league decided to bring that deadline forward for reasons unknown. The club played in the Kent League until 2013 when they were promoted back to the Isthmian League. They won Division One North the following season and were promoted to the Premier Division. After struggling early on, VCD ended their first season at this level in 18th position, two places above the relegation zone, following a run of six consecutive victories. Manager Tony Russell then resigned taking the entire side with him. VCD appointed Keith McMahon to replace him, but with no players at the club and only a few weeks until the start of the 2015–16 season, he was up against it from the beginning in trying to assemble a side to compete at step 3. Despite his efforts, the club was unable to find the consistency required and was relegated back to Division One North. The 2022–23 season saw VCD relegated back to the Southern Counties East Premier Division, losing an inter-step play-off to local rivals Phoenix Sports.

In June 2023 Ross Baker and Danny Joy were named new joint managers at VCD Athletic, having parted with Sporting Club Thamesmead the same month. During the 2024–25 campaign, the team won 8 of their first 10 games. After losing only 4 league games in total, they finished as runners-up to Faversham Town. In the play-offs they defeated Fisher in the final to seal a return to step 4.

On 16 April 2026, shortly after their relegation was confirmed, the club announced that they would be disbanding following the conclusion of the 2025–26 season.

== Ground ==
VCD Athletic play their home games at the Oakwood sports ground, Old Road, Crayford, Kent, DA1 4DN. Oakwood is less than 250 metres from the ground of fellow Isthmian League South East side, Phoenix Sports.

The club played at the Vickers company's Oakwood sports ground from their earliest formation until 1999 when they entered a ground share agreement to play at the home of Thamesmead Town. More recently they have been sharing with Greenwich Borough pending the outcome of a floodlight application. The club were able to return to Oakwood for the 2006–07 season. Oakwood has a capacity of 1180.

== Honours ==
- Isthmian League Division One North
  - Winners: 2013–14
- Southern Counties East Premier Division
  - Play-off winners: 2024–25
- Kent League Premier Division
  - Winners: 2008–09
  - Runners-up: 2001–02, 2006–07, 2007–08, 2012–13
- Kent Premier League Cup
  - Winners: 1999–2000, 2011–12
  - Runners-up: 1998–99
- Kent County League
  - Winners: 1952–53, 1963–64, 1996–97
- Kent Senior Trophy
  - Winners: 2005–06, 2008–09
  - Runners-up: 2001–02
- Kent Intermediate Cup
  - Winners: 1995–96
- Kent Amateur Cup
  - Winners: 1961–62, 1963–64
- Kent FA Junior Cup
  - Winners: 1926–27
- Kent Benevolent Cup
  - Winners: 1926–27

== Club records ==
- Best league position: 18th in Isthmian League Premier Division, 2014–15
- Best FA Cup performance: 2nd qualifying round, 2002–03, 2008–09, 2011–12, 2014–15, 2016–17
- Best FA Trophy performance: 3rd qualifying round, 2025–26
- Best FA Vase performance: 5th round, 2005–06, 2006–07, 2024–25
