= Bermondsey Town F.C. =

Coordinates: 51°30′22.12″N 0°2′24.8″W

Bermondsey Town
- Full name: Bermondsey Town Football Club
- Founded: 2013; 13 years ago
- Ground: St Paul's Sports Ground, Rotherhithe
- Chairman: Rob Russell
- Manager: Stuart Wilson
- Coach: Charlie Pearce
- League: Kent County League Division One West
- 2025–26: Kent County League Division One West, 8th of 14
Home colours

Bermondsey Town Football Club is a football club based in Rotherhithe, England. They are currently members of the Kent County League Division One West and play at St Paul's Sports Ground.

== History ==
In 2013, Bermondsey Town were formed, playing Sunday league football. In 2017, the club switched to Saturday football, joining the Surrey South Eastern Combination. In 2022, the club was admitted into the Southern Counties East Football League Division One.

Bermondsey finished bottom of the Southern Counties East Football League Division One, achieving just 2 victories across the whole league season, and were inevitably relegated to the Kent County Football League Premier Division after just 1 season at Step 6. A consecutive relegation occurred as the club finished second bottom in the KCFL Premier Division in the 2023-24 season, resulting in relegation to the Division 1 West, with a slightly better performance of 4 wins across the season.

== Ground ==
After entering the Surrey South Eastern Combination, Bermondsey used the Crystal Palace National Sports Centre. The club currently play at St Paul's Sports Ground,Rotherhithe.
