= Punjab United F.C. =

Association football club in England

Coordinates: 51°25′04″N 0°22′38″E

Punjab United
- Full name: Punjab United Football Club
- Nickname: Ben Browns Army
- Founded: 2003
- Ground: Elite Venue, Gravesend, Kent, DA12 5ND
- Capacity: ~600 - 1000
- Chairman: Ben (Brown) Sian
- Manager: Jindi Banwait
- League: Isthmian League South East
- 2025–26: Southern Counties East League Premier Division, 5th of 19 (promoted via play-offs) (PoW)

Punjab United Football Club is a football club based in Gravesend, Kent, England. They are currently members of the Isthmian League South East.

== History ==
The club was founded in 2003. The club joined the Kent County League Premier Division in 2016, and in their inaugural season won the Kent Intermediate Challenge Cup, were finalists in the Kent County League Cup, and were crowned the 2016–17 League champions. The club were the first Asian team to win the league and did so with the highest league points total in the history of the league. The club was promoted to Step 6 of the National League System for the first time, being allocated to the Southern Counties East League. United won the Division 1 title at the first time of asking in the 2017/18 season earning promotion to the Premier Division.

In August 2019, they competed in the FA Cup Qualifying for the first time.

In April 2023, the club won the Kent Senior Trophy for the first time beating Deal Town 6–0 at Maidstone United's Gallagher Stadium.

In the 2025–26 season, the club were promoted to the Isthmian League South East Division for the first time in their history, defeating Rusthall on penalties to win the play-off final.

== In popular culture ==
Punjab United's 2018–19 season was the subject of an episode of the BBC documentary series Our Lives. In October 2022, an advertisement for Punjab United featuring Soccer Saturday presenter Jeff Stelling went viral on social media.

== Records ==
- Best FA Cup performance: 1st qualifying round (2024–25)
- Best FA Vase performance: Semi-finals (2025–26)

== Honours ==
- Southern Counties East Football League
  - Premier Division play-offs: 2025–26
  - Division One Champions: 2017–18
- Kent County League
  - Premier Division Champions: 2016–17
  - Inter-Regional Challenge Cup runners-up: 2016–17
- Kent Intermediate Challenge Shield
  - Champions: 2016/17
- Kent Senior Trophy
  - Champions: 2022/23
