= Greenways F.C. =

English football club

Coordinates: 51.3991°N 0.4672°E

Greenways
- Full name: Greenways Football Club
- Founded: 1965
- Ground: Rochester United Sports Ground, Strood
- Chairman: Leslie Harpley & Rob Jeffery
- Manager: Vacant
- League: Southern Counties East League Division One
- 2025–26: Southern Counties East League Division One, 6th of 18

Greenways Football Club is a football club based in Gravesend, Kent, England. They are currently members of the Southern Counties East League Division One and play at the Rochester United Sports Ground in Strood.

== History ==
The club was established as NALGO Football Club in 1965. They joined Division Four of the Gravesend League and were runners-up in their first season, earning promotion to Division Three. The following season they were runners-up in Division Three and were promoted to Division Two. After changing their name to Greenways Football Club, they won the Division Two title in 1967–68, resulting in promotion to Division One. The club were Division One runners-up in 1968–69, securing a fourth successive promotion, this time to the Premier Division.

Greenways went on to win the Premier Division seven times between 1973–74 and 1978–88, as well as winning Group 'A' of the Kent Junior Cup three times. The 1986–87 season saw them win the Premier Division, the Kent Intermediate Shield, the Gordon Charity Shield and the Mallinson Hospital Cup. In 1988 they moved up to the Kent County League, joining the Premier Division of the Western Section. They won the Inter-Regional Challenge Cup and the Premier Division title in their first season, earning promotion to the Senior Division. When the Eastern and Western sections merged in 1992, the club were placed in the Premier Division, and were runners-up in the division in 1993–94. After finishing second-from-bottom of the division in 2004–05, they were relegated to Division One West.

Despite only finishing fifth in Division One West in 2010–11, Greenways were promoted back to the Premier Division as several clubs left the league to form the Kent Invicta League. The club won the Kent Intermediate Shield for the second time in 2012–13. In 2016–17 they were runners-up in Premier Division and won the Inter-Regional Challenge Cup. After finishing second in the league again in 2017–18, they were promoted to Division One of the Southern Counties East League.

== Honours ==
- Kent County League
  - Western Section Premier Division champions 1988–89
  - Inter-Regional Challenge Cup winners 1988–89, 2016–17
- Gravesend League
  - Premier Division champions 1986–87
  - Division Two champions 1967–68
  - Mallinson Hospital Cup winners 1986–87
  - Gordon Charity Shield winners 1986–87
- Kent Intermediate Shield
  - Winners 1986–87, 2012–13

== Records ==
- Best FA Vase performance: First round, 2023–24
