= F.C. Elmstead =

Association football club in England

Coordinates: 51.4143°N 0.1987°E

FC Elmstead
- Full name: FC Elmstead
- Nickname: The Cocks
- Founded: 1958
- Ground: Lower Road, Hextable
- Chairman: Paul Brook
- Manager: Fabio Rossi
- League: Southern Counties East League Division One
- 2025–26: Southern Counties East League Division One, 7th of 18
Home colours	Away colours

F.C. Elmstead is a semi-professional football club based in Elmstead, London, England. They are currently members of the Southern Counties East League Division One and groundshare at Sutton Athletic's Lower Road ground in Hextable. The club's badge features a Minorca cockerel; the club motto is "nil desperandum".

== History ==
The club was founded as Elmstead Rovers on 13 October 1958 at a meeting at 74 The Avenue in Chislehurst, and were initially a Sunday league club. In 1964 the club adopted its current name, with the mid-1960s also seeing the club change its colours of claret and blue to scarlet and blue after the kit was accidentally boil-washed, changing the colour.

In 2013 the club switched from the Metropolitan Sunday League to playing Saturday football and joined Division Three West of the Kent County League. After finishing as runners-up in their first season in the division, they were promoted to Division Two West. The following season saw them finish as Division Two West runners-up, earning promotion to the Kent Invicta League. In 2016 the Kent Invicta League merged into the Southern Counties East League, becoming its Division One.

== Ground ==
The club played at the Chislehurst Recreation Ground from their establishment in 1958 until joining the Kent County League in 2013, when they started groundsharing at Tiepigs Lane in Coney Hall. After moving up to the Kent Invicta League, they moved to Holmesdale's Oakley Road ground in Bromley. Since the summer of 2018, they have been playing at Sutton Athletic's Lower Road ground in Hextable.

== Records ==
- Best FA Vase performance: First round, 2016–17, 2025–26

== See also ==
- F.C. Elmstead players
