= Lordswood, Kent =

Suburb of Chatham in Kent, England

Coordinates: 51°20′10″N 0°32′38″E

Lordswood
- Location within Kent
- Population: 9,189
- Unitary authority: Medway
- Ceremonial county: Kent
- Region: South East
- Country: England
- Sovereign state: United Kingdom
- Post town: CHATHAM
- Postcode district: ME5
- Dialling code: 01634
- Police: Kent
- Fire: Kent
- Ambulance: South East Coast
- UK Parliament: Chatham and Aylesford

Lordswood is a southern suburb of Chatham, Kent, located approximately 3 miles south of Chatham town centre. It is primarily in Medway but a small southern section is in the Borough of Maidstone. Lordswood possesses pockets of woodland, a high street and a health centre, with good access routes to the motorway.

== Sport and leisure ==
Lordswood has a Non-League football club Lordswood F.C., which play at Martyn Grove.

Lordswood leisure centre is located close to The Martyn Grove woodland and has a function suite named after the area.
