= Fisher F.C. =

Association football club in England

Coordinates: 51.5063°N 0.0401°W

Fisher
- Full name: Fisher Football Club
- Nickname: The Fish
- Founded: 2009
- Ground: St Paul's Sports Ground, Rotherhithe
- Chairman: Vacant
- Manager: Ajay Ashanike
- League: Southern Counties East League Premier Division
- 2025–26: Southern Counties East League Premier Division, 2nd of 19
- Website: fisherfc.org
Home colours	Away colours

Fisher Football Club is a football club based in Rotherhithe, Southwark in southeast London, England. The club was established in 2009 after Fisher Athletic folded. Affiliated to the London Football Association, they are currently members of the Southern Counties East League Premier Division and play at the St Paul's Sports Ground.

== History ==
The club was established in 2009 by members of the Fisher Supporters Trust when Fisher Athletic was wound up in the High Court due to financial problems and closed down. The working name AFC Fisher was initially used, before the current name was settled on. The new club was accepted into the Kent League for the 2009–10 season, and were unanimously elected into the Premier Division at the league's AGM in June 2009. Former Fisher Athletic assistant manager Gary Lisney was appointed manager on 26 June.

Fisher finished bottom of the Kent League in 2010–11, but were not relegated. In 2013 the league was renamed the Southern Counties East League, and when the Kent Invicta League became its Division One in 2016, Fisher became members of the Premier Division. They finished second-from-bottom of the Premier Division in 2016–17 and were relegated to Division One. However, under manager Dean Harrison, a third-place finish in Division One the following season was good enough to earn promotion and an immediate return to the Premier Division for the 2018–19 season. Harrison resigned in May 2019 and during the close season former Ilford manager Allan Fenn was appointed in his place. However, Fenn resigned in October 2019 and was replaced by Ajay Ashanike. Ashanike departed in December 2023 and was replaced by Michael Williams who had been a coach throughout Ashanike's tenure. However, Ashanike returned as manager in February 2024.

== Ground ==
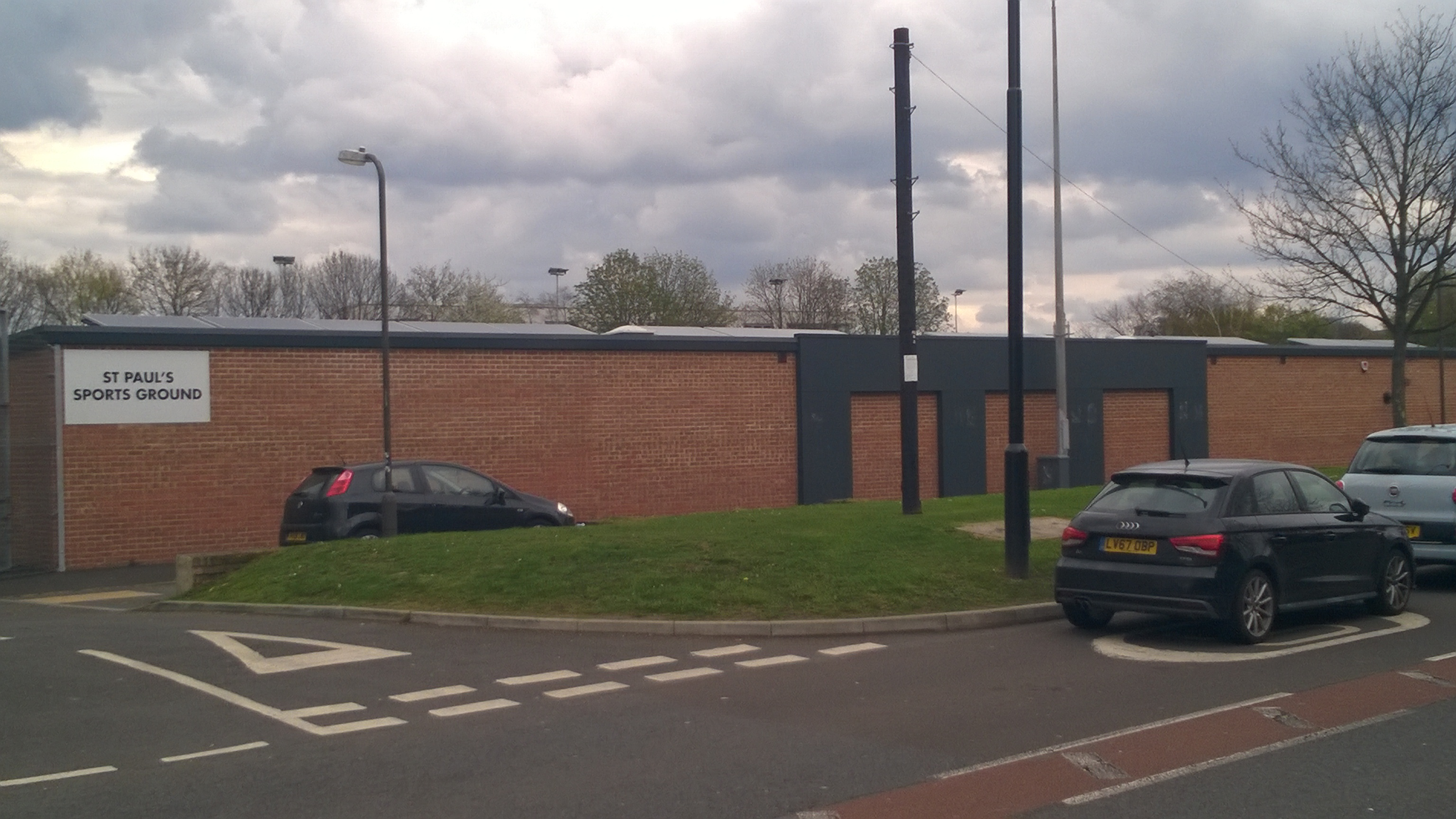

The club initially groundshared at Dulwich Hamlet's Champion Hill, where Fisher Athletic had been playing since 2004, but began work on a new ground on Salter Road close to Fisher Athletic's old Surrey Docks Stadium. The ground opened in 2016, with the first match on 30 July, a 4–0 win against Farnborough OBG. In 2018 St Paul's Sports Ground hosted a number of games in the CONIFA World Cup.

== Records ==
- Best FA Cup performance: Second qualifying round, 2022–23
- Best FA Vase performance: Fifth round, 2025–26
- Biggest win: 10–1 vs Erith Town, Southern Counties East Premier Division, 29 April 2017
- Heaviest defeat: 0–7 vs Erith & Belvedere, Southern Counties East League Premier Division, 30 January 2016
- Most appearances: Luke Thomas, 153
- Most goals: Rob Brown, 38

== See also ==
- Fisher F.C. players
