= Staplehurst Monarchs F.C. =

Coordinates: 51°9′59″N 0°33′52″E

Staplehurst Monarchs
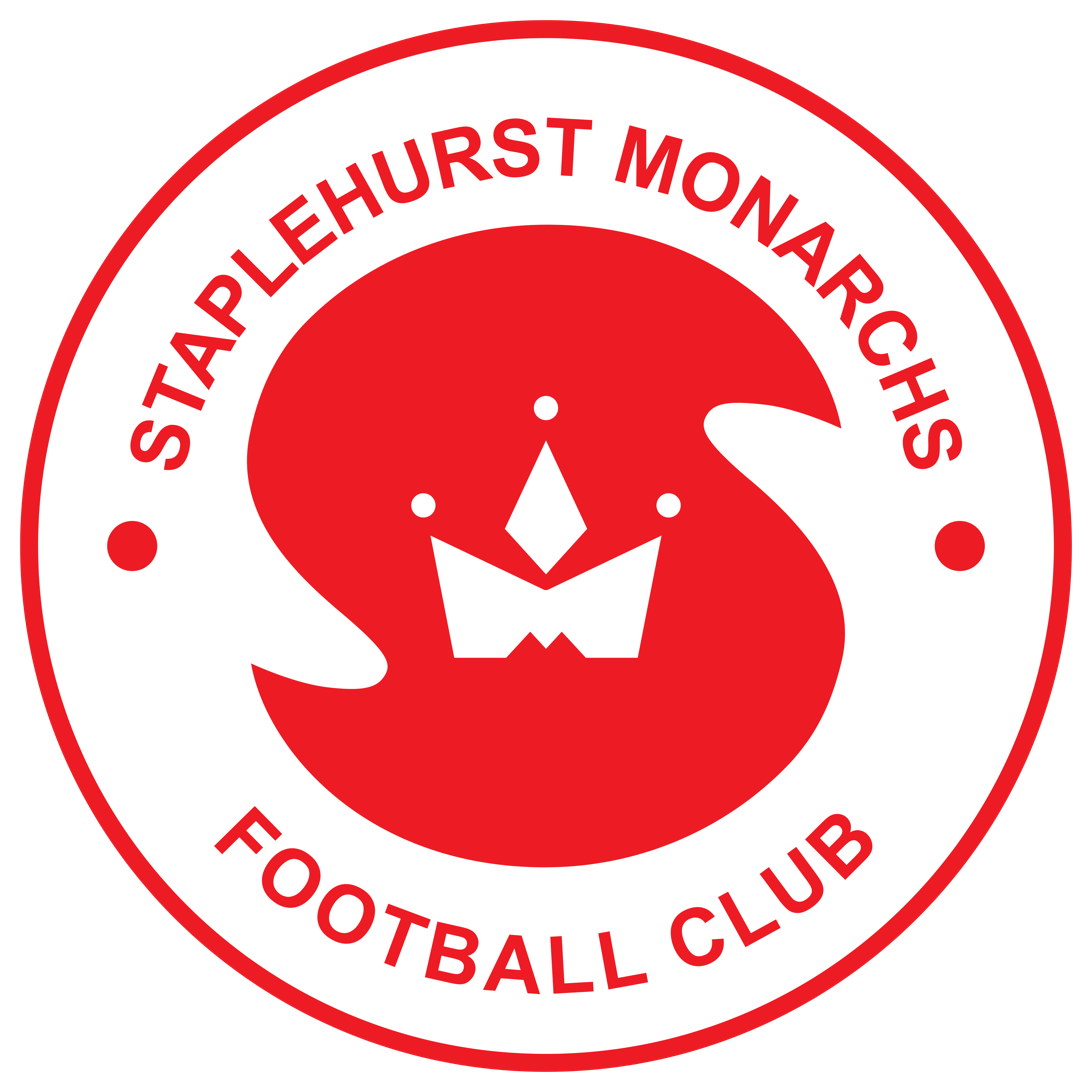
- Full name: Staplehurst Monarchs Football Club
- Nickname: Monarchs
- Founded: 1893; 133 years ago
- Ground: Jubilee Sports Ground, Staplehurst
- Chairman: Paul Bowden-Brown
- League: Southern Counties East League Division One
- 2025–26: Southern Counties East League Division One, 8th of 18
Home colours

Staplehurst Monarchs Football Club is a football club based in Staplehurst, England. They are currently members of the Southern Counties East League Division One and play at the Jubilee Sports Ground.

== History ==
Football in Staplehurst began in 1893 when the Staplehurst Monarchs Football Club, formally known as the Iden Rovers became founder members of the Maidstone and District Saturday League, competing with varying success for over a century. Their highlights came in 1993, the Club’s centenary year, when both the First and Reserve teams achieved League and Cup doubles — unprecedented in the League’s history. In 2001, the Club joined the Kent County League Division Three West, playing at King Georges Field in Loose to meet ground criteria. They won Division Two East and Division Three West in 2006, prompting a move to the Old County Ground in West Malling to compete in Division One, while also achieving Charter Standard and Intermediate status.

After seven seasons away, the Club returned to Staplehurst in 2009 with the completion of the Jubilee Field Pavilion, meeting Step 4 criteria. A year later, they were promoted to the Premier Division through restructuring and merged with the Junior section to become Staplehurst Monarchs United.

In 2018/19 the Club won the Kent County League Premier Division but failed in their appeal for Step 6 promotion. The following season, they led by nine points, when COVID forced the campaign to be voided, with the next season suffering the same fate. FA restructuring later allowed entry into Step 6 SCEFL, supported by Football Foundation funding for ground improvements.

With Senior status secured, the Club began competing in the FA Vase and Kent Senior Cup. Their first SCEFL Division One season saw them finish just above the relegation zone, leading to a management change, while Chairmen Richard Monks and Gordon Reader became Lifetime Presidents.

In 2022/23, Paul Atkins and Lee Wells guided the team to 13th and launched an U23 side to complete the male pathway. The 2023/24 season was the Club’s best yet, finishing 3rd and missing promotion in the playoff final, while also introducing a Women’s team.

Season 2024/25 brought change. A 9th-place finish saw the long-standing Manager and Assistant depart late on, with Ian Docker and JD stepping in to end the season unbeaten. Off the pitch, former Maidstone United Chairman Paul Bowden-Brown joined to support restructuring and became Chairman of the Board. In December 2024, the Club received planning permission for a new Clubhouse at the Jubilee.

In 2025/26, Docker became First Team Manager with JD as Assistant, rebuilding the squad after a major player exodus. The Club now runs four senior sides, including a ladies’ team, and 24 junior teams. With strong foundations on and off the pitch, securing tenure at the Jubilee remains key to the Club’s future ambitions.

== Ground ==
The club currently play at the Jubilee Sports Ground in Staplehurst.

== Honours ==
Kent County League

- Premier Division Champions: 2018-19
- Division 2 East Champions: 2005-06

Southern Counties East League

- Roy Vinter Respect Charity Shield Winners: 2026/27

== Records ==
- Best FA Vase performance: 1st round, 2021–22
