= Phoenix Sports F.C. =

Association football club in England

Coordinates: 51.4589°N 0.1704°E

Phoenix Sports
- Full name: Phoenix Sports Football Club
- Founded: 1935; 91 years ago
- Ground: Phoenix Sports Ground, Barnehurst
- Capacity: 2,000
- Chairman: Tony Crowder
- Manager: Jake Goodman
- League: Southern Counties East League Premier Division
- 2025–26: Southern Counties East League Premier Division, 8th of 19
Home colours	Away colours

Phoenix Sports Football Club is an English football club located in Barnehurst, Kent. The club plays in the Southern Counties East League Premier Division. Phoenix Sports spent most of its history in the Kent County Football League, with a six-year stint in the Spartan League in the late 1980s and early 1990s. The club was accepted into the newly formed Kent Invicta Football League for the inaugural 2011–12 season.

== History ==
Phoenix Sports Football Club was formed in 1935 as St. Johns Welling, which later changed its name to Lakeside. They were members of the North Kent League until 1939. After the Second World War the club was renamed Phoenix, as it was seen as rising from the ashes of the previous clubs amid the destruction of the Blitz. They entered the South East London Amateur League in 1948 (their reserves were members of the Sidcup and Dartford Leagues) and in 1951 the club joined the Western Section of the Kent Amateur League, now Kent County Football League, Division Two. They moved up to Division One, finishing runners up twice in the 1950s, and once in the 1970s. The club entered the Spartan League in 1981-82 and competed there until 1991–92. They then returned to the Kent County League Division One West, winning the challenge cup in 1993–94. They won the league in 1999–2000, gaining promotion to the Premier Division, however after two relegations they ended up in Division Two West. They won Division Two West in 2004–05 and Division One West in 2007–08, regaining their Premier Division status. For the 2011–12 season the club was accepted into the Kent Invicta Football League at level 10 of the English football league system for the league's inaugural season.

In 2012, they became the inaugural runners-up of the Kent Invicta League. In the 2012–13 season, they went one better, winning the Kent Invicta League championship, gaining promotion to the Southern Counties East League. They were Champions of this League in 2014–15, and promoted to the Isthmian League. A 3–0 defeat to Herne Bay on the final day of the 2021–22 season saw Sports relegated back to the Southern Counties East Football League. They achieved immediate promotion back to the Isthmian League, defeating local rivals VCD Athletic in the inter-step play-off having finished second in the regulation season.

== Colours ==
Phoenix Sports' colours are green shirts, with black shorts and socks. The away kit is red shirts, shorts and socks.

== Grounds ==
The club now plays at Phoenix Sports Ground, Mayplace Road East, Barnehurst, Kent, DA7 6JT. The ground is less than 250 metres from the ground of fellow SCEFL side, Se dons Fc. The club originally played at Danson Park.

This ground was constructed by the club's own members on land received from the council after they were impressed by their plans. Planning permission has been awarded to the club for a stand and floodlights in order to conform with step 5 ground regulations.

== Honours ==
=== League honours ===
- Southern Counties East Football League
  - Champions 2014–15
  - Inter-step play-off winners 2022–23
- Kent Invicta Football League
  - Champions (1): 2012–13
  - Runners-up (1): 2011–12
- Kent County League Division One West
  - Champions (2): 1999–2000, 2007–08
  - Runners-up (3): 1953–54, 1955–56, 1975–76
- Kent County League Division Two West
  - Champions (1): 2004–05

=== Cup honours ===
- Kent County League Division One West Challenge Cup
  - Winners 1993–94
  - Runners-up 1955–56
- West Kent Challenge Shield
  - Winners 1995–96, 2004–05, 2007–08
  - Runners-up 1996–97

== Records ==
- Highest league position
  - 8th place Isthmian League North 2016-17
- FA Cup
  - Third Qualifying Round 2017–18
- FA Trophy
  - Second Qualifying Round 2016–17
- FA Vase
  - Fifth Round 2014–15
