= 1971–72 Sussex County Football League =

The 1971–72 Sussex County Football League season was the 47th in the history of Sussex County Football League a football competition in England.

== Division One ==
Sussex County Football League Division One
- Season: 1971–72
- Champions: Bognor Regis Town
- Promoted: Bognor Regis Town
- Relegated: Lancing
- Matches played: 240
- Goals scored: 823 (3.43 per match)

Division One featured 14 clubs which competed in the division last season, along with two new clubs, promoted from Division Two:

- Bognor Regis Town
- Burgess Hill Town

=== League table ===
Pos	Team	Pld	W	D	L	GF	GA	GR	Pts	Qualification or relegation
1	Bognor Regis Town	30	24	1	5	73	22	3.318	49	Promoted to the Southern League Division One South
2	Littlehampton Town	30	21	6	3	72	31	2.323	48	
3	Chichester City	30	19	6	5	81	47	1.723	44	
4	Southwick	30	15	5	10	52	36	1.444	35	
5	Arundel	30	14	6	10	50	41	1.220	34	
6	Haywards Heath	30	12	6	12	41	44	0.932	30	
7	Ringmer	30	11	7	12	51	50	1.020	29	
8	Burgess Hill Town	30	9	10	11	37	47	0.787	28	
9	Whitehawk	30	10	7	13	47	59	0.797	27	
10	Bexhill Town	30	10	5	15	44	42	1.048	25	
11	Three Bridges	30	8	9	13	43	54	0.796	24 (Note: Three Bridges were deducted one point.)	
12	Horsham YMCA	30	9	6	15	47	74	0.635	24	
13	Rye United	30	9	5	16	58	74	0.784	23	
14	East Grinstead	30	9	4	17	44	64	0.688	22	
15	APV Athletic	30	7	6	17	48	58	0.828	20	Resigned from the league
16	Lancing	30	8	1	21	35	80	0.438	17	Relegated to Division Two

Source: nonleaguematters
Rules for classification: 1) points; 2) goal ratio.

== Division Two ==
Sussex County Football League Division Two
- Season: 1971–72
- Champions: Newhaven
- Promoted: Newhaven; Sidley United
- Matches played: 240
- Goals scored: 906 (3.78 per match)

Division Two featured 14 clubs which competed in the division last season, along with two new clubs, relegated from Division One:

- Seaford Town
- Sidley United

=== League table ===
Pos	Team	Pld	W	D	L	GF	GA	GR	Pts	Qualification or relegation
1	Newhaven	30	21	8	1	76	21	3.619	50	Promoted to Division One
2	Sidley United	30	22	3	5	81	26	3.115	47	Promoted to Division One
3	Pagham	30	17	9	4	84	38	2.211	43	
4	Portfield	30	18	4	8	66	42	1.571	40	
5	Peacehaven & Telscombe	30	16	6	8	64	32	2.000	38	
6	Shoreham	30	14	10	6	66	36	1.833	38	
7	Old Varndeanians	30	14	8	8	66	47	1.404	36	
8	Selsey	30	13	8	9	73	48	1.521	34	
9	Wick	30	9	8	13	39	50	0.780	26	
10	Steyning	30	8	9	13	62	77	0.805	25	
11	Wadhurst	30	9	5	16	42	54	0.778	23	Resigned from the league
12	Wigmore Athletic	30	8	7	15	48	68	0.706	23	
13	Seaford Town	30	7	3	20	42	98	0.429	17	
14	Hastings & St Leonards	30	3	9	18	35	71	0.493	15	
15	Ferring	30	4	5	21	30	75	0.400	13	Resigned from the league
16	Hastings Rangers	30	5	2	23	32	123	0.260	12	

Source: nonleaguematters
Rules for classification: 1) points; 2) goal ratio.
