= Woodstock Park =

Woodstock Park may refer to:

- Woodstock Park F.C., the former name of Sittingbourne Community F.C., an English football club
- Woodstock Park (Portland, Oregon), the public park located in Portland, Oregon
