= 2013–14 Isthmian League =

The 2013–14 season was the 99th season of the Isthmian League, which is an English football competition featuring semi-professional and amateur clubs from London, East and South East England. The season saw all three divisions increase from 22 to 24 clubs. The regular season started on 10 August 2013 and finished on 26 April 2014 with the play-off semi-finals scheduled for the week beginning 28 April 2014 and the three finals scheduled for 3–5 May 2014. The fixture list was released during the week beginning 15 July 2013.

Following the resignation of Vauxhall Motors from the Conference North, and the liquidation of Southern League Premier Division club Hinckley United, Redhill and Wroxham were reprieved at the end of the season. Wingate & Finchley were also reprieved from relegation when Worksop Town resigned from the Northern Premier League in late May 2014.

== Premier Division ==
Isthmian League Premier Division
- Season: 2013–14
- Champions: Wealdstone
- Promoted: Wealdstone; Lowestoft Town
- Relegated: Carshalton Athletic; Cray Wanderers; Thamesmead Town
- Matches: 552
- Goals: 1,704 (3.09 per match)
- Top goalscorer: 34 goals - Charles Moone (Hampton & Richmond Borough)
- Highest attendance: 2296 – Maidstone United 4 – 3 Dulwich Hamlet, (15 March)
- Total attendance: 208,021
- Average attendance: 377 (+26.9% to previous season)

The Premier Division consisted of 18 clubs from the previous season and six new clubs in a division expanded from 22 to 24 clubs:

- AFC Hornchurch, relegated from the Conference South
- Billericay Town, relegated from the Conference South
- Dulwich Hamlet, promoted as champions of Division One South
- Grays Athletic, promoted as champions of Division One North
- Maidstone United, promoted as play-off winners in Division One South
- Thamesmead Town, promoted as play-off winners in Division One North
- Thurrock originally finished above the relegation places in 2012–13, and Carshalton Athletic were relegated. However, Thurrock were subsequently deducted three points for fielding an ineligible player, and were thus relegated to Division One North, with Carshalton staying in the Premier Division. A knock-on effect was that Sittingbourne, who had provisionally been switched to Division One North, stayed in Division One South. Thurrock appealed, but the appeal was rejected.

Wealdstone won the division and were promoted to the Conference South, while Lowestoft Town won the play-offs after three consecutive play-off final defeats and were promoted to the Conference North. The Premier Division switched back to four relegation places this season, though Wingate & Finchley were eventually reprieved after Worksop Town resigned from the Northern Premier League.

=== League table ===
| Pos | Team | Pld | W | D | L | GF | GA | GD | Pts | Promotion or relegation |
|---|---|---|---|---|---|---|---|---|---|---|
| 1 | Wealdstone | 46 | 28 | 12 | 6 | 99 | 43 | +56 | 96 | Promoted to the Conference South |
| 2 | Kingstonian | 46 | 25 | 10 | 11 | 80 | 44 | +36 | 85 | Qualified for the play-offs |
| 3 | Bognor Regis Town | 46 | 26 | 7 | 13 | 95 | 65 | +30 | 85 | Qualified for the play-offs |
| 4 | Lowestoft Town | 46 | 24 | 12 | 10 | 76 | 40 | +36 | 84 | Qualified for the play-offs, then promoted to the Conference North |
| 5 | AFC Hornchurch | 46 | 24 | 11 | 11 | 83 | 53 | +30 | 83 | Qualified for the play-offs |
| 6 | Dulwich Hamlet | 46 | 25 | 7 | 14 | 96 | 65 | +31 | 82 | |
| 7 | Maidstone United | 46 | 23 | 12 | 11 | 92 | 57 | +35 | 81 | |
| 8 | Hendon | 46 | 21 | 7 | 18 | 84 | 69 | +15 | 70 | |
| 9 | Leiston | 46 | 19 | 10 | 17 | 73 | 71 | +2 | 67 | |
| 10 | Billericay Town | 46 | 19 | 9 | 18 | 66 | 64 | +2 | 66 | |
| 11 | Margate | 46 | 18 | 10 | 18 | 70 | 67 | +3 | 64 | |
| 12 | Hampton & Richmond | 46 | 18 | 10 | 18 | 72 | 70 | +2 | 64 | |
| 13 | Canvey Island | 46 | 17 | 11 | 18 | 65 | 65 | 0 | 62 | |
| 14 | Grays Athletic | 46 | 17 | 10 | 19 | 74 | 82 | −8 | 61 | |
| 15 | Bury Town | 46 | 17 | 9 | 20 | 60 | 65 | −5 | 60 | |
| 16 | Lewes | 46 | 14 | 17 | 15 | 67 | 67 | 0 | 59 | |
| 17 | Metropolitan Police | 46 | 15 | 13 | 18 | 58 | 59 | −1 | 58 | |
| 18 | Harrow Borough | 46 | 15 | 13 | 18 | 66 | 72 | −6 | 58 | |
| 19 | Enfield Town | 46 | 13 | 12 | 21 | 64 | 90 | −26 | 51 | |
| 20 | East Thurrock United | 46 | 13 | 10 | 23 | 66 | 84 | −18 | 49 | |
| 21 | Wingate & Finchley | 46 | 14 | 7 | 25 | 57 | 84 | −27 | 49 | Reprieved from relegation |
| 22 | Thamesmead Town | 46 | 12 | 10 | 24 | 61 | 90 | −29 | 46 | Relegated to Division One North |
| 23 | Carshalton Athletic | 46 | 8 | 6 | 32 | 40 | 101 | −61 | 30 | Relegated to Division One South |
| 24 | Cray Wanderers | 46 | 7 | 5 | 34 | 40 | 137 | −97 | 26 | Relegated to Division One North |

Rules for classification: 1) points; 2) goal difference; 3) number of goals scored.

==== Top scorers ====
| Player | Club | Goals |
|---|---|---|
| Charles Moone | Hampton & Richmond Borough | 34 |
| Jefferson Louis | Margate | 31 |
| George Purcell | AFC Hornchurch | 30 |
| Erhun Oztumer | Dulwich Hamlet | 28 |
| Stefan Payne | AFC Hornchurch | 27 |
| Andre McCollin | Kingstonian | 27 |
| Ryan Moss | Kingstonian | 25 |
| Scott McGleish | Wealdstone | 23 |
| Francis Collin | Maidstone United | 23 |
| Terry Dodd | Bognor Regis Town | 21 |

==== Play-offs ====
===== Semi-finals =====
| 30 April 2014 | Kingstonian | 0–1 | AFC Hornchurch | Kingsmeadow, Kingston upon Thames |
| 19:45 | | | Hayles 55' | Attendance: 641 |

| 30 April 2014 | Bognor Regis Town | 1–2 | Lowestoft Town | Nyewood Lane, Bognor Regis |
| 19:45 | Dodd 11' | | Haynes-Brown 28'; Reed 78' | Attendance: 1,025 |

===== Final =====
| 5 May 2014 | Lowestoft Town | 3–0 | AFC Hornchurch | Crown Meadow, Lowestoft |
| 15:00 | Eagle 29'; Reed 49'; Haynes-Brown 57' | | | Attendance: 2,697 |

=== Results grid ===
| Home \ Away | AFC | BIL | BOG | BUR | CAN | CAR | CRA | DUL | ETU | ENF | GRY | H&R | HAR | HEN | KIN | LEI | LEW | LOW | MDS | MAR | MET | THA | WEA | W&F |
|---|---|---|---|---|---|---|---|---|---|---|---|---|---|---|---|---|---|---|---|---|---|---|---|---|
| AFC Hornchurch | | 1–2 | 1–0 | 0–0 | 1–1 | 2–1 | 1–2 | 1–1 | 3–0 | 3–0 | 1–2 | 2–3 | 2–4 | 1–2 | 0–0 | 4–2 | 0–1 | 2–1 | 1–0 | 3–2 | 1–0 | 2–0 | 1–1 | 3–0 |
| Billericay Town | 2–2 | | 1–2 | 0–0 | 1–4 | 3–1 | 1–2 | 2–0 | 0–1 | 0–2 | 4–0 | 1–2 | 2–1 | 0–1 | 3–2 | 4–1 | 0–1 | 0–1 | 3–3 | 0–2 | 1–2 | 3–2 | 4–2 | 1–0 |
| Bognor Regis Town | 1–1 | 1–0 | | 5–2 | 5–0 | 2–4 | 4–0 | 4–2 | 3–1 | 5–1 | 0–3 | 4–0 | 3–2 | 3–0 | 0–0 | 0–0 | 3–1 | 4–1 | 1–2 | 5–3 | 2–0 | 2–1 | 1–3 | 1–0 |
| Bury Town | 3–2 | 0–1 | 2–0 | | 0–1 | 0–1 | 1–0 | 0–4 | 0–0 | 3–3 | 2–1 | 0–0 | 3–2 | 0–4 | 0–3 | 0–2 | 2–1 | 1–2 | 1–2 | 1–1 | 2–1 | 0–0 | 0–1 | 2–0 |
| Canvey Island | 1–1 | 1–2 | 1–3 | 0–2 | | 3–2 | 4–0 | 2–1 | 2–1 | 2–1 | 1–0 | 2–1 | 1–3 | 0–0 | 0–1 | 2–3 | 3–3 | 0–0 | 0–1 | 2–0 | 1–1 | 2–2 | 3–2 | 2–0 |
| Carshalton Athletic | 0–1 | 1–0 | 1–3 | 1–3 | 1–1 | | 0–2 | 0–4 | 1–2 | 1–4 | 1–1 | 2–0 | 1–2 | 0–2 | 1–3 | 0–1 | 1–0 | 0–1 | 1–2 | 0–6 | 1–1 | 0–4 | 2–4 | 0–4 |
| Cray Wanderers | 1–6 | 0–1 | 1–2 | 1–3 | 2–1 | 0–0 | | 0–6 | 1–3 | 1–2 | 3–2 | 1–1 | 0–1 | 0–6 | 0–4 | 2–2 | 1–5 | 0–4 | 0–5 | 1–4 | 4–1 | 3–4 | 0–3 | 2–2 |
| Dulwich Hamlet | 2–3 | 2–1 | 0–2 | 1–0 | 1–0 | 3–1 | 4–0 | | 3–0 | 2–2 | 3–2 | 2–2 | 3–2 | 2–0 | 1–1 | 2–3 | 4–2 | 2–0 | 2–0 | 2–0 | 1–2 | 2–0 | 1–4 | 4–2 |
| East Thurrock United | 1–2 | 2–2 | 4–2 | 2–2 | 2–0 | 2–3 | 3–0 | 1–4 | | 1–1 | 3–0 | 0–1 | 1–3 | 6–1 | 2–0 | 1–2 | 0–2 | 0–1 | 3–1 | 1–4 | 1–1 | 3–1 | 0–3 | 0–1 |
| Enfield Town | 0–2 | 1–2 | 2–1 | 1–0 | 3–3 | 2–2 | 1–0 | 3–4 | 3–5 | | 1–1 | 3–0 | 1–0 | 3–2 | 0–1 | 1–3 | 2–1 | 2–2 | 1–1 | 1–1 | 2–1 | 3–1 | 2–4 | 0–3 |
| Grays Athletic | 1–5 | 2–2 | 3–4 | 4–3 | 1–4 | 1–4 | 3–0 | 0–0 | 2–0 | 2–0 | | 1–3 | 2–0 | 1–3 | 0–0 | 3–2 | 4–2 | 1–1 | 0–1 | 3–0 | 0–0 | 1–4 | 1–1 | 2–0 |
| Hampton & Richmond | 1–1 | 0–1 | 4–3 | 3–0 | 0–2 | 4–0 | 4–0 | 0–1 | 1–0 | 2–0 | 0–2 | | 1–1 | 5–2 | 4–1 | 0–2 | 1–1 | 1–2 | 1–3 | 1–2 | 1–3 | 0–1 | 0–3 | 2–0 |
| Harrow Borough | 1–2 | 1–1 | 0–0 | 0–2 | 2–0 | 2–1 | 4–2 | 3–1 | 2–2 | 1–1 | 2–2 | 3–2 | | 1–3 | 0–0 | 1–1 | 2–0 | 1–1 | 4–1 | 0–0 | 1–2 | 1–2 | 0–2 | 0–2 |
| Hendon | 0–1 | 1–2 | 1–0 | 1–0 | 4–2 | 1–0 | 2–0 | 1–2 | 2–2 | 0–3 | 2–3 | 3–4 | 1–2 | | 1–2 | 3–1 | 1–1 | 0–1 | 3–5 | 2–3 | 4–1 | 5–2 | 0–0 | 1–1 |
| Kingstonian | 1–1 | 0–2 | 1–2 | 2–1 | 3–1 | 5–1 | 4–0 | 2–1 | 3–0 | 3–0 | 4–1 | 1–0 | 2–2 | 1–4 | | 2–0 | 4–1 | 1–0 | 0–3 | 2–0 | 1–2 | 4–1 | 0–1 | 1–0 |
| Leiston | 2–3 | 2–2 | 5–2 | 0–4 | 0–2 | 0–1 | 4–1 | 2–1 | 3–1 | 6–1 | 4–1 | 0–0 | 0–1 | 1–0 | 0–0 | | 2–2 | 0–1 | 1–0 | 1–0 | 1–1 | 3–0 | 0–2 | 0–2 |
| Lewes | 1–5 | 1–1 | 1–1 | 1–4 | 1–0 | 2–0 | 4–1 | 2–0 | 2–2 | 3–1 | 0–1 | 1–1 | 1–1 | 0–2 | 1–1 | 5–1 | | 0–2 | 1–0 | 3–0 | 2–2 | 1–1 | 0–3 | 3–0 |
| Lowestoft Town | 3–0 | 1–0 | 2–0 | 1–3 | 2–1 | 5–0 | 0–2 | 2–0 | 3–0 | 2–0 | 2–2 | 0–3 | 3–0 | 2–3 | 2–0 | 3–0 | 1–1 | | 2–1 | 3–0 | 1–1 | 5–0 | 1–1 | 7–0 |
| Maidstone United | 1–1 | 2–1 | 1–2 | 1–1 | 1–1 | 1–0 | 3–0 | 4–3 | 1–1 | 3–0 | 2–1 | 7–2 | 4–4 | 1–1 | 2–0 | 2–2 | 0–0 | 2–0 | | 4–0 | 1–1 | 4–0 | 1–1 | 5–0 |
| Margate | 1–2 | 1–2 | 1–1 | 1–2 | 1–1 | 1–0 | 5–0 | 2–4 | 1–1 | 1–0 | 2–5 | 2–2 | 3–1 | 2–3 | 1–2 | 1–1 | 1–1 | 3–0 | 1–0 | | 1–0 | 2–1 | 0–1 | 3–2 |
| Metropolitan Police | 2–1 | 0–2 | 0–2 | 0–3 | 0–1 | 3–0 | 7–1 | 0–0 | 1–2 | 3–1 | 1–2 | 1–3 | 2–0 | 0–1 | 0–2 | 2–1 | 0–0 | 0–0 | 1–2 | 0–2 | | 3–1 | 2–1 | 3–1 |
| Thamesmead Town | 1–2 | 3–3 | 1–2 | 4–2 | 2–0 | 1–1 | 2–1 | 1–3 | 1–0 | 1–1 | 1–0 | 1–1 | 0–1 | 0–4 | 2–2 | 2–4 | 2–0 | 2–2 | 4–1 | 0–2 | 0–0 | | 0–2 | 1–2 |
| Wealdstone | 2–0 | 2–0 | 2–2 | 3–0 | 2–0 | 3–1 | 7–1 | 2–2 | 5–0 | 4–1 | 3–1 | 1–3 | 3–0 | 1–1 | 0–4 | 3–1 | 2–2 | 0–0 | 2–1 | 0–1 | 1–1 | 2–0 | | 2–2 |
| Wingate & Finchley | 0–3 | 5–0 | 3–0 | 1–0 | 0–4 | 4–0 | 1–1 | 2–3 | 4–3 | 1–1 | 1–3 | 1–2 | 3–1 | 1–0 | 0–4 | 0–1 | 1–3 | 0–0 | 2–4 | 0–0 | 0–3 | 3–1 | 0–2 | |

Updated to match(es) played on 30 April 2014. Source: Ryman League Premier Division
Legend: Blue = home team win; Yellow = draw; Red = away team win.

=== Stadia and locations ===
Locations of the Premier Division teams
Greater London Premier Division football clubs

| Club | Stadium | Capacity |
|---|---|---|
| AFC Hornchurch | Hornchurch Stadium | 3,500 |
| Billericay Town | New Lodge | 3,500 |
| Bognor Regis Town | Nyewood Lane | 4,000 |
| Bury Town | Ram Meadow | 3,500 |
| Canvey Island | Park Lane | 4,308 |
| Carshalton Athletic | War Memorial Sports Ground | 5,000 |
| Cray Wanderers | Hayes Lane (groundshare with Bromley) | 6,000 |
| Dulwich Hamlet | Champion Hill | 3,000 |
| East Thurrock United | Rookery Hill | 4,000 |
| Enfield Town | Queen Elizabeth II Stadium | 2,500 |
| Grays Athletic | The Mill Field (groundshare with Aveley) | 1,100 |
| Hampton & Richmond Borough | Beveree Stadium | 3,500 |
| Harrow Borough | Earlsmead Stadium | 3,070 |
| Hendon | Earlsmead Stadium (groundshare with Harrow Borough) | 3,070 |
| Kingstonian | Kingsmeadow (groundshare with AFC Wimbledon) | 5,194 |
| Leiston | Victory Road | 2,500 |
| Lewes | The Dripping Pan | 3,000 |
| Lowestoft Town | Crown Meadow | 2,250 |
| Maidstone United | Gallagher Stadium | 2,226 |
| Margate | Hartsdown Park | 2,100 |
| Metropolitan Police | Imber Court | 3,000 |
| Thamesmead Town | Bayliss Avenue | 6,000 |
| Wealdstone | Grosvenor Vale | 2,640 |
| Wingate & Finchley | The Harry Abrahams Stadium | 1,500 |

== Division One North ==
Isthmian League Division One North
- Season: 2013–14
- Champions: VCD Athletic
- Promoted: VCD Athletic; Witham Town
- Relegated: Erith & Belvedere; Waltham Forest
- Matches: 552
- Goals: 1,933 (3.5 per match)
- Top goalscorer: 41 goals - Alexander Read (Harlow Town)
- Total attendance: 58,649
- Average attendance: 106 (+0.0% to previous season)

Division One North consisted of 18 clubs from the previous season and six new clubs in a division expanded from 22 to 24 clubs:

- Barkingside, promoted as runners-up in the Essex Senior League
- Burnham Ramblers, promoted as champions of the Essex Senior League
- Dereham Town, promoted as champions of the Eastern Counties League
- Erith & Belvedere, promoted as champions of the Kent League
- Thurrock, relegated from the Premier Division
- VCD Athletic, promoted as runners-up in the Kent League

VCD Athletic won the division to earn a second consecutive title and were promoted to the Premier Division along with play-off winners Witham Town. After the league expansion, the Division One sections switched to three relegation places, although Wroxham were reprieved from relegation after the resignation of Vauxhall Motors and the liquidation of Hinckley United higher up the pyramid.

=== League table ===
| Pos | Team | Pld | W | D | L | GF | GA | GD | Pts | Promotion or relegation |
|---|---|---|---|---|---|---|---|---|---|---|
| 1 | VCD Athletic | 46 | 32 | 3 | 11 | 116 | 54 | +62 | 99 | Promoted to the Premier Division |
| 2 | Witham Town | 46 | 30 | 8 | 8 | 109 | 54 | +55 | 98 | Qualified for the play-offs, then promoted to the Premier Division |
| 3 | Heybridge Swifts | 46 | 28 | 9 | 9 | 108 | 59 | +49 | 93 | Qualified for the play-offs |
| 4 | Harlow Town | 46 | 27 | 10 | 9 | 105 | 59 | +46 | 91 | Qualified for the play-offs |
| 5 | Needham Market | 46 | 25 | 12 | 9 | 85 | 44 | +41 | 87 | Qualified for the play-offs |
| 6 | Thurrock | 46 | 26 | 9 | 11 | 99 | 60 | +39 | 87 | |
| 7 | Dereham Town | 46 | 22 | 11 | 13 | 98 | 65 | +33 | 77 | |
| 8 | Soham Town Rangers | 46 | 24 | 4 | 18 | 92 | 75 | +17 | 76 | |
| 9 | Maldon & Tiptree | 46 | 21 | 13 | 12 | 82 | 68 | +14 | 76 | |
| 10 | AFC Sudbury | 46 | 21 | 13 | 12 | 76 | 63 | +13 | 76 | |
| 11 | Romford | 46 | 21 | 5 | 20 | 76 | 69 | +7 | 68 | |
| 12 | Chatham Town | 46 | 20 | 8 | 18 | 74 | 76 | −2 | 68 | |
| 13 | Aveley | 46 | 20 | 5 | 21 | 81 | 81 | 0 | 65 | |
| 14 | Redbridge | 46 | 16 | 11 | 19 | 78 | 84 | −6 | 59 | |
| 15 | Cheshunt | 46 | 12 | 17 | 17 | 74 | 75 | −1 | 53 | |
| 16 | Tilbury | 46 | 14 | 11 | 21 | 56 | 74 | −18 | 53 | |
| 17 | Burnham Ramblers | 46 | 14 | 10 | 22 | 69 | 100 | −31 | 52 | |
| 18 | Waltham Abbey | 46 | 14 | 8 | 24 | 71 | 90 | −19 | 50 | |
| 19 | Brentwood Town | 46 | 11 | 13 | 22 | 71 | 92 | −21 | 46 | |
| 20 | Barkingside | 46 | 12 | 10 | 24 | 76 | 120 | −44 | 46 | |
| 21 | Ware | 46 | 12 | 9 | 25 | 73 | 93 | −20 | 45 | |
| 22 | Wroxham | 46 | 10 | 6 | 30 | 77 | 123 | −46 | 36 | Reprieved from relegation |
| 23 | Waltham Forest | 46 | 6 | 7 | 33 | 43 | 118 | −75 | 25 | Relegated to the Essex Senior League |
| 24 | Erith & Belvedere | 46 | 6 | 4 | 36 | 44 | 137 | −93 | 22 | Relegated to the Southern Counties East League |

Rules for classification: 1) points; 2) goal difference; 3) number of goals scored.

==== Top scorers ====
| Player | Club | Goals |
|---|---|---|
| Alexander Read | Harlow Town | 41 |
| David Knight | Thurrock | 32 |
| Luke Stanley | Soham Town Rangers | 31 |
| Kristopher Newby | Witham Town | 22 |
| Junior Dadson | Harlow Town | 22 |

==== Play-offs ====
===== Semi-finals =====
| 29 April 2014 | Witham Town | 1–0 | Needham Market | Village Glass Stadium, Witham |
| 19:45 | Newby 88' | | | Attendance: 305 |

| 29 April 2014 | Heybridge Swifts | 0–3 | Harlow Town | Scraley Road, Heybridge |
| 19:45 | | | Read 24'; Antoine 33', 52' | Attendance: 423 |

===== Final =====
| 4 May 2014 | Witham Town | 3–0 | Harlow Town | Village Glass Stadium, Witham |
| 15:00 | Murfet 26'; Townrow 33'; Pedulu 86' | | | Attendance: 898 |

=== Results grid ===
| Home \ Away | SUD | AVE | BAR | BRE | BUR | CHA | CHE | DER | E&B | HAR | HEY | M&T | NDH | RED | ROM | SOH | THU | TIL | VCD | WAL | WFO | WAR | WIT | WRO |
|---|---|---|---|---|---|---|---|---|---|---|---|---|---|---|---|---|---|---|---|---|---|---|---|---|
| AFC Sudbury | | 2–0 | 4–2 | 1–0 | 3–0 | 0–2 | 2–2 | 2–0 | 1–1 | 0–0 | 1–5 | 1–1 | 0–0 | 3–1 | 1–3 | 1–2 | 1–1 | 1–0 | 1–1 | 2–1 | 3–0 | 2–1 | 1–2 | 1–0 |
| Aveley | 2–1 | | 5–0 | 2–1 | 3–0 | 3–1 | 3–3 | 1–3 | 3–1 | 0–1 | 1–2 | 2–3 | 1–1 | 1–3 | 1–0 | 2–1 | 2–1 | 2–0 | 0–2 | 4–2 | 1–2 | 1–1 | 0–3 | 6–1 |
| Barkingside | 1–4 | 2–0 | | 3–3 | 1–3 | 2–2 | 2–1 | 1–1 | 3–0 | 3–4 | 3–2 | 2–4 | 1–1 | 3–5 | 0–2 | 0–2 | 0–3 | 3–0 | 0–5 | 4–5 | 4–3 | 1–1 | 0–6 | 1–1 |
| Brentwood Town | 1–2 | 1–3 | 2–1 | | 0–1 | 1–3 | 3–1 | 2–4 | 2–0 | 0–2 | 0–5 | 2–0 | 1–3 | 2–2 | 2–1 | 3–2 | 2–2 | 1–2 | 0–1 | 2–3 | 4–0 | 2–1 | 1–2 | 0–0 |
| Burnham Ramblers | 1–4 | 1–4 | 5–0 | 3–3 | | 1–2 | 1–4 | 1–1 | 0–1 | 2–5 | 1–1 | 1–1 | 1–2 | 2–2 | 0–2 | 2–2 | 3–2 | 3–1 | 1–6 | 0–2 | 1–0 | 2–1 | 1–2 | 2–1 |
| Chatham Town | 0–0 | 1–2 | 2–3 | 2–2 | 2–0 | | 2–2 | 3–2 | 1–1 | 0–2 | 1–4 | 1–0 | 0–0 | 4–1 | 0–2 | 2–0 | 1–2 | 3–1 | 1–2 | 1–0 | 2–1 | 3–0 | 2–4 | 1–1 |
| Cheshunt | 2–2 | 1–1 | 2–0 | 0–0 | 2–3 | 3–1 | | 4–1 | 3–2 | 1–1 | 2–2 | 1–4 | 0–3 | 3–2 | 4–0 | 0–1 | 1–2 | 0–0 | 0–2 | 0–1 | 1–1 | 2–2 | 1–1 | 1–3 |
| Dereham Town | 2–0 | 5–1 | 4–2 | 2–2 | 0–0 | 3–0 | 0–0 | | 4–1 | 2–1 | 1–3 | 6–1 | 0–1 | 0–2 | 4–2 | 3–1 | 0–2 | 2–2 | 1–2 | 1–0 | 10–1 | 4–1 | 1–4 | 4–0 |
| Erith & Belvedere | 0–4 | 1–2 | 0–6 | 2–4 | 1–3 | 1–4 | 0–2 | 0–3 | | 0–2 | 3–2 | 2–4 | 0–3 | 3–1 | 1–1 | 0–3 | 1–0 | 0–2 | 0–1 | 3–2 | 1–2 | 2–6 | 1–4 | 0–0 |
| Harlow Town | 1–1 | 2–0 | 8–3 | 5–1 | 3–1 | 2–0 | 2–2 | 2–2 | 3–2 | | 3–4 | 2–2 | 2–1 | 2–2 | 1–0 | 1–2 | 1–1 | 3–0 | 3–2 | 3–4 | 4–0 | 1–0 | 2–0 | 3–0 |
| Heybridge Swifts | 2–0 | 3–1 | 1–0 | 3–1 | 2–0 | 0–2 | 1–1 | 2–2 | 7–0 | 2–1 | | 0–0 | 1–1 | 6–1 | 3–1 | 1–3 | 0–5 | 3–2 | 3–0 | 5–2 | 0–2 | 3–1 | 2–1 | 7–2 |
| Maldon & Tiptree | 3–2 | 4–1 | 2–2 | 3–1 | 4–4 | 2–3 | 2–0 | 2–0 | 4–1 | 2–0 | 2–1 | | 4–2 | 2–1 | 0–1 | 1–3 | 1–1 | 3–1 | 1–2 | 1–0 | 2–1 | 2–1 | 1–1 | 4–1 |
| Needham Market | 2–0 | 3–1 | 2–2 | 0–0 | 1–2 | 7–1 | 1–2 | 3–2 | 2–1 | 1–1 | 2–1 | 1–1 | | 1–0 | 3–0 | 1–0 | 2–3 | 3–2 | 0–0 | 4–0 | 1–0 | 1–0 | 1–0 | 2–2 |
| Redbridge | 2–3 | 1–2 | 4–1 | 1–1 | 2–2 | 0–1 | 1–1 | 0–1 | 1–0 | 2–4 | 1–1 | 0–0 | 2–1 | | 5–2 | 3–0 | 1–1 | 1–1 | 0–1 | 3–2 | 2–1 | 3–2 | 1–1 | 4–0 |
| Romford | 1–2 | 2–0 | 4–1 | 2–3 | 2–0 | 2–2 | 2–6 | 1–2 | 4–1 | 0–1 | 1–3 | 0–0 | 3–2 | 5–0 | | 1–0 | 3–1 | 1–1 | 2–0 | 0–2 | 4–0 | 2–1 | 2–3 | 3–0 |
| Soham Town Rangers | 2–2 | 4–3 | 2–2 | 2–0 | 3–2 | 5–1 | 4–2 | 3–1 | 2–0 | 1–1 | 1–2 | 4–2 | 2–1 | 4–1 | 0–2 | | 2–3 | 3–0 | 1–3 | 4–1 | 4–1 | 0–2 | 5–2 | 2–6 |
| Thurrock | 1–3 | 2–1 | 3–0 | 4–1 | 6–0 | 1–0 | 1–0 | 1–3 | 10–1 | 5–1 | 3–2 | 1–1 | 1–0 | 2–1 | 1–2 | 2–0 | | 1–2 | 2–6 | 2–0 | 3–2 | 2–2 | 3–0 | 2–1 |
| Tilbury | 1–1 | 2–1 | 1–2 | 3–1 | 4–2 | 0–2 | 2–1 | 0–0 | 2–0 | 0–2 | 0–2 | 0–1 | 0–2 | 2–0 | 2–1 | 2–0 | 1–1 | | 2–1 | 2–3 | 1–1 | 2–1 | 0–3 | 4–1 |
| VCD Athletic | 1–2 | 3–1 | 4–1 | 3–1 | 2–0 | 3–2 | 2–2 | 1–3 | 6–2 | 1–2 | 1–2 | 3–2 | 1–2 | 3–1 | 6–0 | 0–2 | 2–0 | 3–2 | | 2–0 | 4–1 | 3–2 | 3–1 | 8–0 |
| Waltham Abbey | 0–2 | 2–2 | 0–2 | 0–0 | 0–3 | 2–1 | 3–1 | 1–1 | 5–0 | 1–3 | 0–1 | 0–0 | 0–3 | 1–4 | 0–1 | 2–0 | 2–1 | 2–2 | 1–3 | | 2–2 | 1–2 | 4–1 | 4–0 |
| Waltham Forest | 3–3 | 1–2 | 0–1 | 3–3 | 2–3 | 1–3 | 0–4 | 0–4 | 0–2 | 1–0 | 0–2 | 0–2 | 0–4 | 0–1 | 0–4 | 1–3 | 1–2 | 0–0 | 0–5 | 2–2 | | 1–2 | 1–5 | 3–2 |
| Ware | 3–0 | 0–2 | 1–3 | 5–5 | 3–3 | 0–1 | 2–0 | 4–0 | 3–2 | 0–5 | 1–1 | 2–1 | 1–3 | 3–4 | 1–0 | 3–5 | 0–1 | 0–0 | 0–2 | 3–3 | 1–0 | | 0–3 | 2–1 |
| Witham Town | 5–1 | 2–1 | 4–0 | 1–0 | 4–0 | 2–1 | 3–1 | 1–1 | 3–2 | 2–5 | 1–1 | 3–0 | 0–0 | 2–0 | 0–0 | 1–0 | 2–2 | 3–0 | 4–1 | 3–0 | 4–1 | 4–2 | | 4–1 |
| Wroxham | 2–3 | 3–4 | 2–2 | 1–4 | 1–2 | 3–4 | 1–2 | 1–2 | 7–1 | 3–2 | 1–2 | 4–0 | 2–5 | 1–3 | 3–2 | 3–0 | 2–3 | 4–2 | 0–3 | 4–3 | 0–1 | 4–3 | 1–2 | |

Updated to match(es) played on 30 April 2014. Source: Ryman League Division One North
Legend: Blue = home team win; Yellow = draw; Red = away team win.

=== Stadia and locations ===
Locations of Division One North teams
Greater London Division One North teams

| Club | Stadium | Capacity |
|---|---|---|
| AFC Sudbury | King's Marsh | 2,500 |
| Aveley | The Mill Field (groundshare with Grays Athletic) | 1,100 |
| Barkingside | Oakside (groundshare with Redbridge) | 3,000 |
| Brentwood Town | The Brentwood Centre Arena | 1,800 |
| Burnham Ramblers | Leslie Fields | 2,000 |
| Chatham Town | The Sports Ground | 5,000 |
| Cheshunt | Cheshunt Stadium | 3,000 |
| Dereham Town | Aldiss Park | 3,000 |
| Erith & Belvedere | Park View Road (groundshare with Welling United) | 5,000 |
| Harlow Town | Barrows Farm | 3,500 |
| Heybridge Swifts | Scraley Road | 3,000 |
| Maldon & Tiptree | Wallace Binder Ground | 2,000 |
| Needham Market | Bloomfields | 4,000 |
| Redbridge | Oakside | 3,000 |
| Romford | Ship Lane (groundshare with Thurrock) | 3,500 |
| Soham Town Rangers | Julius Martin Lane | 2,000 |
| Thurrock | Ship Lane | 3,500 |
| Tilbury | Chadfields | 4,000 |
| VCD Athletic | The Oakwood | 1,180 |
| Waltham Abbey | Capershotts | 3,500 |
| Waltham Forest | Wadham Lodge | 3,500 |
| Ware | Wodson Park | 3,300 |
| Witham Town | Spa Road | 2,500 |
| Wroxham | Trafford Park | 2,000 |

== Division One South ==
Isthmian League Division One South
- Season: 2013–14
- Champions: Peacehaven & Telscombe
- Promoted: Leatherhead; Peacehaven & Telscombe
- Relegated: Crawley Down Gatwick; Eastbourne Town
- Matches: 552
- Goals: 1,897 (3.44 per match)
- Top goalscorer: 46 goals - Ross Allen (Guernsey)
- Total attendance: 114,319
- Average attendance: 207 (-21.9% to previous season)

Division One South consisted of 20 clubs from the previous season and four new clubs in a division expanded from 22 to 24 clubs:

- Guernsey, promoted as runners-up in the Combined Counties League
- Hastings United, relegated from the Premier Division
- Peacehaven & Telscombe, promoted as champions of the Sussex County League
- Redhill, promoted as runners-up in the Sussex County League

Peacehaven & Telscombe won the division to earn a second consecutive title and were promoted to the Premier Division along with play-off winners Leatherhead. After the league expansion, the Division One sections switched to three relegation places, although Redhill were reprieved from relegation after the resignation of Vauxhall Motors and the liquidation of Hinckley United higher up the pyramid.

=== League table ===
| Pos | Team | Pld | W | D | L | GF | GA | GD | Pts | Promotion or relegation |
|---|---|---|---|---|---|---|---|---|---|---|
| 1 | Peacehaven & Telscombe | 46 | 33 | 8 | 5 | 128 | 55 | +73 | 107 | Promoted to the Premier Division |
| 2 | Folkestone Invicta | 46 | 27 | 8 | 11 | 102 | 59 | +43 | 89 | Qualified for the play-offs |
| 3 | Leatherhead | 46 | 28 | 8 | 10 | 93 | 46 | +47 | 86 (Note: Leatherhead were deducted six points on 26 April for a registration irregularity.) | Qualified for the play-offs, then promoted to the Premier Division |
| 4 | Guernsey | 46 | 23 | 12 | 11 | 93 | 65 | +28 | 81 | Qualified for the play-offs |
| 5 | Hastings United | 46 | 24 | 7 | 15 | 73 | 62 | +11 | 79 | Qualified for the play-offs |
| 6 | Burgess Hill Town | 46 | 22 | 11 | 13 | 88 | 67 | +21 | 77 | |
| 7 | Merstham | 46 | 23 | 7 | 16 | 81 | 63 | +18 | 76 | |
| 8 | Hythe Town | 46 | 22 | 7 | 17 | 87 | 71 | +16 | 73 | |
| 9 | Walton Casuals | 46 | 22 | 4 | 20 | 89 | 93 | −4 | 70 | |
| 10 | Faversham Town | 46 | 18 | 14 | 14 | 78 | 69 | +9 | 68 | |
| 11 | Tooting & Mitcham United | 46 | 17 | 12 | 17 | 79 | 75 | +4 | 63 | |
| 12 | Ramsgate | 46 | 18 | 8 | 20 | 84 | 79 | +5 | 62 | |
| 13 | Chipstead | 46 | 18 | 8 | 20 | 79 | 83 | −4 | 62 | |
| 14 | Sittingbourne | 46 | 16 | 13 | 17 | 69 | 75 | −6 | 61 | |
| 15 | Worthing | 46 | 17 | 8 | 21 | 80 | 98 | −18 | 59 | |
| 16 | Horsham | 46 | 15 | 11 | 20 | 66 | 78 | −12 | 56 | |
| 17 | Corinthian-Casuals | 46 | 15 | 10 | 21 | 69 | 73 | −4 | 55 | |
| 18 | Herne Bay | 46 | 15 | 9 | 22 | 69 | 72 | −3 | 54 | |
| 19 | Three Bridges | 46 | 15 | 8 | 23 | 71 | 88 | −17 | 53 | |
| 20 | Whitstable Town | 46 | 14 | 11 | 21 | 61 | 78 | −17 | 53 | |
| 21 | Walton & Hersham | 46 | 14 | 9 | 23 | 75 | 92 | −17 | 51 | |
| 22 | Redhill | 46 | 13 | 6 | 27 | 72 | 96 | −24 | 45 | Reprieved from relegation |
| 23 | Crawley Down Gatwick | 46 | 9 | 6 | 31 | 51 | 139 | −88 | 33 | Relegated to the Sussex County League |
| 24 | Eastbourne Town | 46 | 6 | 11 | 29 | 60 | 121 | −61 | 29 | Relegated to the Sussex County League |

Rules for classification: 1) points; 2) goal difference; 3) number of goals scored.

==== Top scorers ====
| Player | Club | Goals |
|---|---|---|
| Ross Allen | Guernsey | 46 |
| Charlie Walker | Peacehaven & Telscombe | 36 |
| Shaun Welford | Hythe Town | 34 |
| Thomas Bradbrook | Leatherhead | 30 |
| Jamie Byatt | Corinthian-Casuals | 29 |

==== Play-offs ====
===== Semi-finals =====
| 29 April 2014 | Folkestone Invicta | 3–2 (a.e.t.) | Hastings United | Cheriton Road, Folkestone |
| 19:45 | Chappell 8'; Luchford 67'; Fergusson 113' (o.g.) | | Olorunda 49'; Adams 75' | Attendance: 951 |

| 29 April 2014 | Leatherhead | 3–2 | Guernsey | Fetcham Grove, Leatherhead |
| 19:45 | Smith 2'; Bradbrook 36', 62' | | McGrath 80'; Rihoy 83' | Attendance: 561 |

===== Final =====
| 3 May 2014 | Folkestone Invicta | 1–1 (1–3 p) | Leatherhead | Cheriton Road, Folkestone |
| 15:00 | Booth 87' | | Bradbrook 13' | Attendance: 1,287 |

=== Results grid ===
| Home \ Away | BUR | CHI | COR | CDG | EST | FAV | FOL | GUE | HAS | HER | HOR | HYT | LEA | MER | PET | RAM | RED | SIT | THR | T&M | W&H | WAL | WHT | WOR |
|---|---|---|---|---|---|---|---|---|---|---|---|---|---|---|---|---|---|---|---|---|---|---|---|---|
| Burgess Hill Town | | 4–0 | 3–0 | 1–1 | 2–0 | 2–0 | 0–0 | 0–3 | 1–1 | 3–2 | 1–0 | 4–5 | 0–0 | 3–2 | 1–2 | 1–0 | 2–1 | 7–1 | 2–1 | 0–0 | 3–2 | 6–1 | 2–1 | 4–1 |
| Chipstead | 0–0 | | 1–0 | 4–0 | 2–2 | 0–1 | 4–3 | 1–3 | 0–1 | 3–4 | 3–1 | 2–3 | 0–3 | 1–2 | 1–1 | 1–3 | 1–1 | 2–1 | 3–4 | 4–1 | 1–1 | 3–2 | 1–0 | 0–3 |
| Corinthian-Casuals | 0–2 | 3–4 | | 1–2 | 4–0 | 1–1 | 2–3 | 1–2 | 2–2 | 1–4 | 1–1 | 0–4 | 0–0 | 1–3 | 2–0 | 3–1 | 7–0 | 1–1 | 1–0 | 0–0 | 0–1 | 1–2 | 0–0 | 1–0 |
| Crawley Down Gatwick | 1–4 | 4–3 | 2–4 | | 6–1 | 1–2 | 3–2 | 1–1 | 2–6 | 3–3 | 0–2 | 0–6 | 0–5 | 1–3 | 0–1 | 0–0 | 2–1 | 0–3 | 2–3 | 0–0 | 1–2 | 0–5 | 0–2 | 1–2 |
| Eastbourne Town | 1–1 | 1–2 | 0–0 | 6–0 | | 3–6 | 2–3 | 3–3 | 3–2 | 1–1 | 0–2 | 2–0 | 2–2 | 1–0 | 0–2 | 0–4 | 0–2 | 2–4 | 0–3 | 0–2 | 1–3 | 0–4 | 0–3 | 2–2 |
| Faversham Town | 2–1 | 5–3 | 2–3 | 2–1 | 3–1 | | 2–2 | 1–2 | 2–0 | 1–0 | 2–1 | 2–3 | 1–1 | 1–2 | 3–0 | 5–2 | 0–2 | 2–1 | 1–1 | 3–1 | 2–2 | 0–1 | 0–0 | 0–0 |
| Folkestone Invicta | 4–1 | 1–3 | 2–1 | 8–0 | 1–1 | 2–1 | | 1–1 | 2–1 | 2–1 | 4–0 | 1–1 | 2–0 | 3–2 | 2–3 | 3–1 | 3–1 | 5–0 | 4–2 | 3–0 | 4–2 | 0–1 | 1–0 | 3–1 |
| Guernsey | 3–1 | 1–0 | 2–1 | 11–0 | 4–2 | 2–1 | 2–2 | | 2–0 | 4–2 | 0–1 | 5–1 | 2–0 | 0–1 | 2–2 | 0–4 | 0–1 | 1–1 | 1–1 | 2–1 | 1–2 | 2–1 | 2–1 | 4–1 |
| Hastings United | 3–2 | 0–2 | 2–1 | 1–0 | 3–0 | 0–0 | 3–0 | 0–4 | | 1–0 | 2–1 | 3–2 | 2–2 | 2–2 | 1–2 | 3–1 | 2–1 | 1–1 | 1–0 | 3–1 | 2–1 | 1–0 | 3–1 | 4–0 |
| Herne Bay | 3–1 | 1–2 | 1–2 | 1–0 | 3–2 | 1–1 | 2–1 | 0–1 | 0–2 | | 2–2 | 0–1 | 2–0 | 4–0 | 1–2 | 1–0 | 0–3 | 1–1 | 4–1 | 3–1 | 1–2 | 0–2 | 1–0 | 0–1 |
| Horsham | 0–2 | 2–2 | 1–3 | 1–0 | 2–1 | 1–1 | 1–5 | 6–2 | 2–0 | 1–0 | | 0–2 | 2–2 | 0–1 | 1–4 | 2–2 | 0–2 | 3–1 | 1–0 | 1–2 | 1–1 | 3–1 | 3–1 | 1–1 |
| Hythe Town | 3–0 | 2–0 | 4–3 | 1–1 | 2–3 | 1–2 | 2–3 | 1–1 | 1–2 | 1–1 | 1–1 | | 1–0 | 3–2 | 1–2 | 2–3 | 1–0 | 3–0 | 3–1 | 1–1 | 0–2 | 6–0 | 1–1 | 4–2 |
| Leatherhead | 2–3 | 3–0 | 3–0 | 2–1 | 5–0 | 1–3 | 1–0 | 2–0 | 3–0 | 1–0 | 2–1 | 0–1 | | 1–0 | 0–0 | 4–0 | 3–1 | 3–0 | 2–1 | 5–1 | 3–3 | 1–0 | 1–2 | 2–0 |
| Merstham | 1–1 | 1–4 | 0–1 | 1–3 | 5–0 | 4–1 | 0–2 | 3–3 | 2–0 | 3–1 | 1–0 | 0–2 | 3–2 | | 0–3 | 0–2 | 3–2 | 2–0 | 5–1 | 3–1 | 3–0 | 3–2 | 5–0 | 1–2 |
| Peacehaven & Telscombe | 3–2 | 2–1 | 3–1 | 10–0 | 4–1 | 0–0 | 3–0 | 2–0 | 2–1 | 4–2 | 5–5 | 4–0 | 3–0 | 3–1 | | 5–1 | 3–1 | 2–0 | 2–3 | 2–2 | 2–2 | 5–0 | 4–1 | 6–0 |
| Ramsgate | 1–2 | 0–2 | 1–1 | 4–2 | 2–0 | 2–3 | 2–1 | 2–1 | 5–0 | 5–1 | 4–2 | 1–0 | 0–1 | 1–1 | 3–1 | | 1–3 | 2–4 | 5–0 | 2–1 | 1–1 | 2–3 | 1–2 | 3–0 |
| Redhill | 3–4 | 0–1 | 0–3 | 6–0 | 4–4 | 2–1 | 0–1 | 0–1 | 0–4 | 1–2 | 2–1 | 3–1 | 1–2 | 1–1 | 1–4 | 1–0 | | 2–3 | 0–0 | 0–3 | 0–3 | 2–3 | 3–3 | 3–1 |
| Sittingbourne | 2–2 | 1–1 | 0–0 | 5–2 | 3–0 | 0–0 | 0–3 | 1–1 | 2–1 | 4–2 | 2–0 | 0–1 | 0–1 | 1–0 | 3–3 | 3–1 | 3–3 | | 0–1 | 2–0 | 1–2 | 0–4 | 1–0 | 3–0 |
| Three Bridges | 2–2 | 1–3 | 3–2 | 1–2 | 1–1 | 1–3 | 2–3 | 1–4 | 1–2 | 2–1 | 0–1 | 3–0 | 1–4 | 1–2 | 0–1 | 0–0 | 5–2 | 2–0 | | 1–4 | 5–2 | 1–1 | 1–0 | 4–2 |
| Tooting & Mitcham United | 0–2 | 2–2 | 5–1 | 2–0 | 3–4 | 4–2 | 0–0 | 2–2 | 1–0 | 0–0 | 2–1 | 4–1 | 1–2 | 0–1 | 3–5 | 3–4 | 2–1 | 0–0 | 2–0 | | 2–1 | 4–3 | 6–0 | 2–1 |
| Walton & Hersham | 5–1 | 1–3 | 1–4 | 1–2 | 3–1 | 2–2 | 0–3 | 4–0 | 2–0 | 1–2 | 0–1 | 0–4 | 0–5 | 1–4 | 1–2 | 1–1 | 2–3 | 0–4 | 2–2 | 0–1 | | 0–2 | 3–4 | 2–1 |
| Walton Casuals | 2–1 | 3–1 | 1–3 | 2–0 | 2–2 | 5–3 | 1–2 | 2–2 | 0–1 | 0–6 | 2–3 | 3–1 | 2–4 | 1–1 | 4–2 | 3–1 | 3–2 | 2–3 | 1–2 | 3–2 | 1–5 | | 3–1 | 3–1 |
| Whitstable Town | 1–0 | 3–2 | 3–1 | 0–1 | 3–2 | 0–0 | 1–1 | 1–3 | 1–1 | 0–0 | 1–1 | 0–1 | 2–3 | 1–2 | 1–3 | 4–1 | 3–2 | 1–1 | 2–4 | 2–2 | 3–2 | 0–1 | | 2–1 |
| Worthing | 1–1 | 2–0 | 0–1 | 7–3 | 3–2 | 4–2 | 2–1 | 3–0 | 2–3 | 2–2 | 5–3 | 3–2 | 2–4 | 0–0 | 0–4 | 2–2 | 4–2 | 3–2 | 2–1 | 2–2 | 2–1 | 5–2 | 1–3 | |

Updated to match(es) played on 30 April 2014. Source: Ryman League Division One South
Legend: Blue = home team win; Yellow = draw; Red = away team win.

=== Stadia and locations ===
Locations of Division One South clubs
Greater London Division One South clubs

| Club | Stadium | Capacity |
|---|---|---|
| Burgess Hill Town | Leylands Park | 2,000 |
| Chipstead | High Road | 2,000 |
| Corinthian-Casuals | King George's Field | 2,700 |
| Crawley Down Gatwick | The Haven Sportsfield | 1,000 |
| Eastbourne Town | The Saffrons | 3,000 |
| Faversham Town | Shepherd Neame Stadium | 2,000 |
| Folkestone Invicta | Cheriton Road | 4,000 |
| Guernsey | Footes Lane | 5,000 |
| Hastings United | The Pilot Field | 4,050 |
| Herne Bay | Winch's Field | 4,000 |
| Horsham | Gorings Mead | 1,500 |
| Hythe Town | Reachfields Stadium | 3,000 |
| Leatherhead | Fetcham Grove | 3,400 |
| Merstham | Moatside | 2,000 |
| Peacehaven & Telscombe | The Sports Park | 1,500 |
| Ramsgate | Southwood Stadium | 2,500 |
| Redhill | Kiln Brow | 2,000 |
| Sittingbourne | Woodstock Park (groundshare with Woodstock Sports) | 3,000 |
| Three Bridges | Jubilee Field | 1,500 |
| Tooting & Mitcham United | Imperial Fields | 3,500 |
| Walton & Hersham | The Sports Ground | 2,000 |
| Walton Casuals | Waterside Stadium | 2,000 |
| Whitstable Town | The Belmont Ground | 3,000 |
| Worthing | Worthing Stadium | 4,000 |

== League Cup ==
2013–14 Isthmian League Cup
Tournament details
- Country: England
- Teams: 66

Final positions
- Champions: Maidstone United
- Runners-up: AFC Sudbury

Tournament statistics
- Matches played: 65
- Goals scored: 243 (3.74 per match)

The Isthmian League Cup 2013–14 (billed as the Robert Dyas Cup 2013–14 for sponsorship reasons) was the 40th season of the Isthmian League Cup, the cup competition of the whole Isthmian League.

=== Calendar ===
| Round | Dates | Matches | Clubs |
|---|---|---|---|
| Preliminary round | 18 September to 9 October | 2 | 66 → 64 |
| First round | 3 September to 19 November | 32 | 64 → 32 |
| Second round | 4 November to 4 December | 16 | 32 → 16 |
| Third round | 3 December to 14 January | 8 | 16 → 8 |
| Quarterfinals | 28 January to 6 March | 4 | 8 → 4 |
| Semi-finals | 25 February to 13 March | 2 | 4 → 2 |
| Final | 8 April | 1 | 2 → 1 |

Sixty-six clubs took part in the competition, while six clubs refused to participate:

- Bognor Regis Town
- Canvey Island
- Dereham Town
- Guernsey
- VCD Athletic
- Wroxham

=== Preliminary round ===
Four clubs participated in the Premilinary round, while all other clubs received a bye to the first round.

| Tie | Home team (tier) | Score | Away team (tier) | Att. |
| 1 | Eastbourne Town (S) | 0–3 | Burgess Hill Town (S) | 90 |
| 2 | Leatherhead (S) | 0–2 | Walton & Hersham (S) | 107 |

=== First round ===
The two clubs to have made it through the preliminary round were entered into the draw with every other Isthmian League club, making sixty-four teams.

| Tie | Home team (tier) | Score | Away team (tier) | Att. |
| 3 | Metropolitan Police (P) | 3–1 | Chipstead (S) | 57 |
| 4 | Redbridge (N) | 1–3 | Enfield Town (P) | 49 |
| 5 | Sittingbourne (S) | 3–1 | Erith & Belvedere (N) | 60 |
| 6 | Whitstable Town (S) | 0–1 | Hythe Town (S) | 146 |
| 7 | Lewes (P) | 2–1 | Corinthian-Casuals (S) | 232 |
| 8 | Peacehaven & Telscombe (S) | 3–1 | Worthing (S) | 59 |
| 9 | Romford (N) | 1–0 | East Thurrock United (P) | 102 |
| 10 | Wealdstone (P) | 1–0 | Hendon (P) | 207 |
| 11 | Billericay Town (P) | 7–2 | AFC Hornchurch (P) | 171 |
| 12 | Chatham Town (N) | 4–1 | Ramsgate (S) | 108 |
| 13 | Hampton & Richmond Borough (P) | 3–3 | Carshalton Athletic (P) | 112 |
Hampton & Richmond Borough advance 5–3 on penalties
| 14 | Maldon & Tiptree (N) | 3–4 | Burnham Ramblers (N) | 51 |
| 15 | Three Bridges (S) | 0–2 | Cray Wanderers (P) | 65 |
| 16 | Thurrock (N) | 1–2 | Aveley (N) | 65 |
| 17 | Hastings United (S) | 4–0 | Faversham Town (S) | 241 |
| 18 | Bury Town (P) | 0–1 | AFC Sudbury (N) | 126 |
| 19 | Horsham (S) | 2–7 | Burgess Hill Town (S) | 71 |

| Tie | Home team (tier) | Score | Away team (tier) | Att. |
| 20 | Waltham Abbey (N) | 1–0 | Brentwood Town (N) | 30 |
| 21 | Wingate & Finchley (P) | 1–1 | Witham Town (N) | 62 |
Witham Town advance 5–3 on penalties
| 22 | Merstham (S) | 1–2 | Kingstonian (P) | 80 |
| 23 | Waltham Forest (N) | 0–1 | Harlow Town (N) | 43 |
| 24 | Cheshunt (N) | 3–2 | Barkingside (N) | 52 |
| 25 | Crawley Down Gatwick (S) | 1–3 | Redhill (S) | 62 |
| 26 | Dulwich Hamlet (P) | 1–0 | Tooting & Mitcham (S) | 349 |
| 27 | Lowestoft Town (P) | 4–1 | Heybridge Swifts (N) | 205 |
| 28 | Maidstone United (P) | 2–1 | Herne Bay (S) | 808 |
| 29 | Margate (P) | 1–1 | Folkestone Invicta (S) | 138 |
Margate advance 4–3 on penalties
| 30 | Needham Market (N) | 2–5 | Leiston (P) | 226 |
| 31 | Soham Town Rangers (N) | 1–4 | Harrow Borough (P) | 86 |
| 32 | Walton Casuals (S) | 1–2 | Walton & Hersham (S) | 104 |
| 33 | Tilbury (N) | 1–1 | Grays Athletic (P) | 88 |
Grays Athletic advance 4–1 on penalties
| 34 | Ware (N) | 5–3 | Thamesmead Town (P) | 36 |

=== Second round ===
| Tie | Home team (tier) | Score | Away team (tier) | Att. |
| 35 | Kingstonian (P) | 5–0 | Walton & Hersham (S) | 194 |
| 36 | Metropolitan Police (P) | 3–1 | Hampton & Richmond Borough (P) | 92 |
| 37 | Peacehaven & Telscombe (S) | 0–1 | Burgess Hill Town | 54 |
| 38 | Waltham Abbey (N) | 3–4 | Cheshunt (N) | 43 |
| 39 | Aveley (N) | 2–1 | Billericay Town (P) | 69 |
| 40 | Burnham Ramblers (N) | 1–6 | AFC Sudbury (N) | 52 |
| 41 | Cray Wanderers (P) | 5–1 | Dulwich Hamlet (P) | 69 |
| 42 | Enfield Town (P) | 1–2 | Harlow Town (N) | 98 |
| 43 | Lowestoft Town (P) | 1–4 | Leiston (P) | 245 |

| Tie | Home team (tier) | Score | Away team (tier) | Att. |
| 44 | Maidstone United (P) | 3–1 | Hythe Town (S) | 339 |
| 45 | Wealdstone (P) | 2–2 | Harrow Borough (P) | 159 |
Harrow Borough advance 4–3 on penalties
| 46 | Romford (N) | 0–2 | Grays Athletic (P) | 102 |
| 47 | Margate (P) | 0–3 | Hastings United (S) | 103 |
| 48 | Sittingbourne (S) | 0–2 | Chatham Town (N) | 72 |
| 49 | Ware (N) | 2–2 | Witham Town (N) | 38 |
Ware advance 4–2 on penalties
| 50 | Lewes (P) | 3–2 | Redhill (S) | 136 |

=== Third round ===
| Tie | Home team (tier) | Score | Away team (tier) | Att. |
| 51 | AFC Sudbury (N) | 2–2 | Leiston (P) | 114 |
AFC Sudbury advance 3–1 on penalties
| 52 | Maidstone United (P) | 2–0 | Hastings United (S) | 413 |
| 53 | Burgess Hill Town (S) | 3–1 | Lewes (P) | 183 |
| 54 | Harlow Town (N) | 3–1 | Kingstonian (P) | 126 |

| Tie | Home team (tier) | Score | Away team (tier) | Att. |
| 55 | Chatham Town (N) | 2–1 | Cray Wanderers (P) | 76 |
| 56 | Cheshunt (N) | 1–1 | Ware (N) | 97 |
Ware advance 9–8 on penalties
| 57 | Grays Athletic (P) | 2–1 | Aveley (N) | 83 |
| 58 | Metropolitan Police (P) | 0–3 | Harrow Borough (P) | 44 |

=== Quarterfinals ===
| Tie | Home team (tier) | Score | Away team (tier) | Att. |
| 59 | Harlow Town (N) | 1–4 | AFC Sudbury (N) | 134 |
| 60 | Maidstone United (P) | 1–0 | Burgess Hill Town (S) | 548 |

| Tie | Home team (tier) | Score | Away team (tier) | Att. |
| 61 | Chatham Town (N) | 3–3 | Grays Athletic (P) | 97 |
Grays Athletic advance 4–1 on penalties
| 62 | Ware (N) | 2–2 | Harrow Borough (P) | 55 |
Ware advance 5–4 on penalties

=== Semi-finals ===
| Tie | Home team (tier) | Score | Away team (tier) | Att. |
| 63 | Maidstone United (P) | 6–0 | Grays Athletic (P) | 695 |
| 64 | Ware (N) | 1–2 | AFC Sudbury (N) | 82 |

=== Final ===
| 8 April 2014 65 | AFC Sudbury (N) | 0–3 | Maidstone United (P) | Gallagher Stadium, Maidstone |
| 19:30 | | Report | Phillips 38'; Collin 83', 90' | Attendance: 1,829 |

== See also ==
- Isthmian League
- 2013–14 Northern Premier League
- 2013–14 Southern Football League
