= 1972–73 Sussex County Football League =

The 1972–73 Sussex County Football League season was the 48th in the history of Sussex County Football League a football competition in England.

== Division One ==
Sussex County Football League Division One
- Season: 1972–73
- Champions: Chichester City
- Relegated: Burgess Hill Town; Three Bridges
- Matches played: 210
- Goals scored: 566 (2.7 per match)

Division One featured 13 clubs which competed in the division last season, along with two new clubs, promoted from Division Two:

- Newhaven
- Sidley United

=== League table ===
Pos	Team	Pld	W	D	L	GF	GA	GR	Pts	Qualification or relegation
1	Chichester City	28	17	7	4	63	33	1.909	41	
2	Ringmer	28	15	8	5	34	20	1.700	38	
3	East Grinstead	28	12	10	6	34	21	1.619	34	
4	Haywards Heath	28	15	2	11	45	34	1.324	32	
5	Bexhill Town	28	10	8	10	40	34	1.176	28	
6	Southwick	28	9	10	9	35	42	0.833	28	
7	Littlehampton Town	28	9	9	10	40	38	1.053	27	
8	Whitehawk	28	10	7	11	33	35	0.943	27	
9	Newhaven	28	10	6	12	41	40	1.025	26	
10	Sidley United	28	7	11	10	40	42	0.952	25	
11	Rye United	28	9	7	12	34	45	0.756	25	
12	Arundel	28	6	12	10	33	35	0.943	24	
13	Horsham YMCA	28	9	6	13	38	50	0.760	24	
14	Burgess Hill Town	28	7	9	12	26	46	0.565	23	Relegated to Division Two
15	Three Bridges	28	5	8	15	30	51	0.588	18	Relegated to Division Two

Source: nonleaguematters
Rules for classification: 1) points; 2) goal ratio.

== Division Two ==
Sussex County Football League Division Two
- Season: 1972–73
- Champions: Portfield
- Promoted: Portfield; Shoreham
- Matches played: 156
- Goals scored: 522 (3.35 per match)

Division Two featured twelve clubs which competed in the division last season, along with one new club, relegated from Division One:

- Lancing

=== League table ===
Pos	Team	Pld	W	D	L	GF	GA	GR	Pts	Qualification or relegation
1	Portfield	24	20	3	1	86	22	3.909	43	Promoted to Division One
2	Shoreham	24	17	2	5	52	29	1.793	36	Promoted to Division One
3	Pagham	24	12	7	5	44	28	1.571	31	
4	Peacehaven & Telscombe	24	12	4	8	48	35	1.371	28	
5	Old Varndeanians	24	11	5	8	46	42	1.095	27	Resigned to the Brighton, Hove & District League
6	Wick	24	11	4	9	35	23	1.522	26	
7	Hastings & St Leonards	24	10	6	8	37	34	1.088	26	
8	Seaford Town	24	10	5	9	37	34	1.088	25	
9	Hastings Rangers	24	6	5	13	35	72	0.486	17	Resigned from the league
10	Lancing	24	6	5	13	21	45	0.467	17	
11	Selsey	24	6	4	14	27	45	0.600	16	
12	Steyning	24	5	4	15	30	51	0.588	14	
13	Wigmore Athletic	24	2	2	20	24	62	0.387	6	

Source: nonleaguematters
Rules for classification: 1) points; 2) goal ratio.
