= 1974–75 Sussex County Football League =

The 1974–75 Sussex County Football League season was the 50th in the history of Sussex County Football League a football competition in England.

== Division One ==
Sussex County Football League Division One
- Season: 1974–75
- Champions: Southwick
- Relegated: Sidley United; Portfield
- Matches played: 210
- Goals scored: 554 (2.64 per match)

Division One featured 13 clubs which competed in the division last season, along with two new clubs, promoted from Division Two:

- Three Bridges
- Wigmore Athletic

=== League table ===
Pos	Team	Pld	W	D	L	GF	GA	GR	Pts	Qualification or relegation
1	Southwick	28	18	5	5	58	24	2.417	41	
2	Haywards Heath	28	16	7	5	48	20	2.400	39	
3	Wigmore Athletic	28	13	10	5	38	24	1.583	36	
4	Ringmer	28	13	4	11	45	38	1.184	30	
5	Littlehampton Town	28	12	5	11	36	33	1.091	29	
6	East Grinstead	28	10	7	11	30	30	1.000	27	
7	Horsham YMCA	28	11	5	12	38	44	0.864	27	
8	Arundel	28	10	7	11	31	37	0.838	27	
9	Newhaven	28	10	5	13	36	40	0.900	25	
10	Whitehawk	28	11	3	14	37	44	0.841	25	
11	Bexhill Town	28	10	5	13	30	38	0.789	25	
12	Chichester City	28	9	7	12	27	41	0.659	25	
13	Three Bridges	28	7	9	12	32	36	0.889	23	
14	Sidley United	28	9	6	13	32	41	0.780	22 (Note: Sidley United were deducted two points.)	Relegated to Division Two
15	Portfield	28	6	5	17	36	64	0.563	17	Relegated to Division Two

Source: nonleaguematters
Rules for classification: 1) points; 2) goal ratio.

== Division Two ==
Sussex County Football League Division Two
- Season: 1974–75
- Champions: Burgess Hill Town
- Promoted: Burgess Hill Town; Rye United
- Matches played: 132
- Goals scored: 394 (2.98 per match)

Division Two featured nine clubs which competed in the division last season, along with three new clubs:

- Crowborough Athletic
- Rye United, relegated from Division One
- Shoreham, relegated from Division One

=== League table ===
Pos	Team	Pld	W	D	L	GF	GA	GR	Pts	Qualification or relegation
1	Burgess Hill Town	22	16	5	1	49	14	3.500	37	Promoted to Division One
2	Rye United	22	15	5	2	48	16	3.000	35	Promoted to Division One
3	Shoreham	22	11	4	7	34	25	1.360	26	
4	Crowborough Athletic	22	9	7	6	38	36	1.056	25	
5	Hastings & St Leonards	22	8	6	8	33	34	0.971	22	
6	Peacehaven & Telscombe	22	9	3	10	40	38	1.053	21	
7	Steyning	22	5	10	7	28	32	0.875	20	
8	Lancing	22	5	7	10	25	34	0.735	17	
9	Seaford Town	22	5	7	10	25	34	0.735	16 (Note: Seaford Town were deducted one point.)	
10	Selsey	22	7	2	13	29	45	0.644	16	
11	Pagham	22	6	3	13	25	46	0.543	15	
12	Wick	22	4	5	13	20	40	0.500	13	

Source: nonleaguematters
Rules for classification: 1) points; 2) goal ratio.
