= 1975–76 Athenian League =

Athenian League
- Season: 1975–76

The 1975–76 Athenian League season was the 53rd in the history of Athenian League. The league consisted of 32 teams.

== Division One ==
Athenian League Division One
- Season: 1975–76
- Champions: Cheshunt
- Promoted: None
- Relegated: None
- Matches played: 240
- Goals scored: 642 (2.68 per match)

The division featured two new teams, promoted from last season's Division Two:

- Egham Town (1st)
- Addlestone (2nd)

=== League table ===
Pos	Team	Pld	W	D	L	GF	GA	GR	Pts
1	Cheshunt (C)	30	18	5	7	66	31	2.129	41
2	Egham Town	30	16	7	7	46	28	1.643	39
3	Addlestone	30	15	7	8	40	30	1.333	37
4	Grays Athletic	30	15	6	9	39	29	1.345	36
5	Rainham Town	30	15	3	12	52	37	1.405	33
6	Erith & Belvedere	30	11	10	9	29	28	1.036	32
7	Alton Town	30	14	4	12	37	42	0.881	32
8	Worthing	30	12	7	11	42	35	1.200	31
9	Hounslow	30	11	7	12	50	43	1.163	29
10	Lewes	30	9	11	10	45	45	1.000	29
11	Letchworth Town	30	10	9	11	31	38	0.816	29
12	Redhill	30	10	7	13	31	34	0.912	27
13	Ruislip Manor	30	9	8	13	39	41	0.951	26
14	Leyton-Wingate	30	8	8	14	37	41	0.902	24
15	Marlow	30	6	6	18	27	61	0.443	18
16	Edmonton & Haringey	30	5	7	18	31	79	0.392	17

Source: rsssf.com
Rules for classification: 1) points; 2) goal difference; 3) number of goals scored.
(C) Champions

=== Stadia and locations ===
Locations of the Athenian League Division One clubs
Greater London Athenian League Division One football clubs

Club	Stadium
Addlestone	Liberty Lane
Alton Town	Anstey Park
Cheshunt	Cheshunt Stadium
Egham Town	The Runnymede Stadium
Erith & Belvedere	Park View
Grays Athletic	New Recreation Ground
Haringey Borough	Coles Park
Hounslow	Denbigh Road
Letchworth Garden City	Baldock Road
Lewes	The Dripping Pan
Leyton-Wingate	Wadham Lodge
Marlow	Alfred Davis Memorial Ground
Rainham Town	Deri Park
Redhill	Kiln Brow
Ruislip Manor	Grosvenor Vale
Worthing	Woodside Road

== Division Two ==
Athenian League Division Two
- Season: 1975–76
- Champions: Epping Town
- Promoted: Epping Town; Epsom & Ewell
- Relegated: None
- Matches played: 240
- Goals scored: 577 (2.4 per match)

The division featured 5 new teams:

- 1 relegated from last season's Division One:
  - Eastbourne United (18th)
- 4 joined the division:
  - Camberley Town, from Spartan League
  - Harefield United, from Spartan League
  - Epsom & Ewell, from Surrey Senior League
  - Tring Town, from Spartan League

=== League table ===
Pos	Team	Pld	W	D	L	GF	GA	GR	Pts	Promotion
1	Epping Town (C, P)	30	16	10	4	47	21	2.238	42	Promotion to Division One
2	Epsom & Ewell (P)	30	16	8	6	58	25	2.320	40	Promotion to Division One
3	Edgware	30	14	10	6	36	29	1.241	38	
4	Hemel Hempstead	30	15	6	9	46	36	1.278	36	
5	Windsor & Eton	30	13	7	10	42	26	1.615	33	
6	Tring Town	30	12	9	9	31	31	1.000	33	
7	Eastbourne Town	30	11	9	10	45	42	1.071	31	Left to join Sussex County League
8	Feltham	30	11	8	11	39	42	0.929	30	
9	Aylesbury United	30	8	12	10	36	40	0.900	28	Transferred to Southern League Division One South
10	Willesden	30	10	10	10	22	34	0.647	28 (Note: Willesden deducted 2 points.)	
11	Molesey	30	10	7	13	36	39	0.923	27	
12	Camberley Town	30	7	11	12	31	43	0.721	25	
13	Uxbridge	30	7	10	13	22	31	0.710	24	
14	Eastbourne United	30	7	8	15	29	41	0.707	22	
15	Harefield United	30	6	10	14	29	43	0.674	22	
16	Faversham Town	30	8	3	19	28	54	0.519	19	Left to join Kent League

Source: rsssf.com
Rules for classification: 1) points; 2) goal difference; 3) number of goals scored.
(C) Champions; (P) Promoted

=== Stadia and locations ===
Locations of the Athenian League Division Two clubs
Greater London Athenian League Division Two football clubs

Club	Stadium
Aylesbury United	Buckingham Road
Camberley Town	Kroomer Park
Eastbourne Town	The Saffrons
Eastbourne United	The Oval
Edgware	White Lion
Epping Town	Stonards Hill
Epsom & Ewell	Merland Rise
Faversham Town	Shepherd Neame Stadium
Feltham	The Orchard
Harefield United	Preston Park
Hemel Hempstead	Vauxhall Road
Molesey	Walton Road Stadium
Tring Town	Pendley Ground
Uxbridge	Honeycroft
Willesden	King Edwards Park
Windsor & Eton	Stag Meadow
