= 1965–66 Sussex County Football League =

The 1965–66 Sussex County Football League season was the 41st in the history of Sussex County Football League a football competition in England.

== Division One ==
Sussex County Football League Division One
- Season: 1965–66
- Champions: Bexhill Town Athletic
- Relegated: Arundel; Wigmore Athletic
- Matches played: 240
- Goals scored: 1,044 (4.35 per match)

Division One featured 14 clubs which competed in the division last season, along with two new clubs, promoted from Division Two:

- Sidley United
- Southwick

=== League table ===
Pos	Team	Pld	W	D	L	GF	GA	GR	Pts	Qualification or relegation
1	Bexhill Town Athletic	30	18	10	2	81	41	1.976	46	
2	Chichester City	30	20	6	4	92	47	1.957	46	
3	Sidley United	30	18	7	5	87	49	1.776	43	
4	Seaford Town	30	15	6	9	73	57	1.281	36	
5	Southwick	30	14	7	9	78	56	1.393	35	
6	Rye United	30	14	5	11	69	57	1.211	33	
7	Lancing	30	15	2	13	61	48	1.271	32	
8	Selsey	30	13	6	11	78	76	1.026	32	
9	East Grinstead	30	11	7	12	61	68	0.897	29	
10	Whitehawk	30	10	8	12	67	80	0.838	28	
11	Haywards Heath	30	12	2	16	57	55	1.036	26	
12	Littlehampton Town	30	7	11	12	52	69	0.754	25	
13	Shoreham	30	9	4	17	56	68	0.824	22	
14	Bognor Regis Town	30	7	5	18	51	78	0.654	19	
15	Arundel	30	6	5	19	45	91	0.495	17	Relegated to Division Two
16	Wigmore Athletic	30	4	3	23	36	104	0.346	11	Relegated to Division Two

Source: nonleaguematters
Rules for classification: 1) points; 2) goal ratio.

== Division Two ==
Sussex County Football League Division Two
- Season: 1965–66
- Champions: Horsham YMCA
- Promoted: Horsham YMCA; Newhaven
- Matches played: 306
- Goals scored: 1,645 (5.38 per match)

Division Two featured 16 clubs which competed in the division last season, along with two new clubs, relegated from Division One:

- Hastings Rangers
- Newhaven

=== League table ===
Pos	Team	Pld	W	D	L	GF	GA	GR	Pts	Qualification or relegation
1	Horsham YMCA	34	31	2	1	141	30	4.700	64	Promoted to Division One
2	Newhaven	34	30	2	2	142	34	4.176	62	Promoted to Division One
3	Ringmer	34	24	2	8	155	68	2.279	50	
4	Wadhurst	34	22	2	10	102	66	1.545	46	
5	Hastings & St Leonards	34	17	6	11	99	77	1.286	40	
6	Ferring	34	18	3	13	100	76	1.316	39	
7	APV Athletic	34	17	3	14	95	79	1.203	37	
8	Old Varndeanians	34	14	6	14	83	67	1.239	34	
9	Wick	34	17	0	17	96	90	1.067	34	
10	Hastings Rangers	34	15	3	16	91	92	0.989	33	
11	Three Bridges	34	11	10	13	78	82	0.951	32	
12	Brighton Old Grammarians	34	14	3	17	74	85	0.871	31	
13	Brighton North End	34	12	6	16	94	126	0.746	30	
14	Burgess Hill	34	11	3	20	57	82	0.695	25	
15	Steyning	34	10	4	20	68	94	0.723	24	
16	Portfield	34	6	4	24	55	123	0.447	16	
17	Uckfield Town	34	3	2	29	58	180	0.322	8	Resigned to the Mid-Sussex League
18	Battle Rangers	34	3	1	30	57	194	0.294	7	

Source: nonleaguematters
Rules for classification: 1) points; 2) goal ratio.
