= 1976–77 Sussex County Football League =

The 1976–77 Sussex County Football League season was the 52nd in the history of Sussex County Football League a football competition in England.

== Division One ==
Sussex County Football League Division One
- Season: 1976–77
- Champions: Eastbourne Town
- Relegated: Three Bridges; Whitehawk
- Matches played: 240
- Goals scored: 702 (2.93 per match)

Division One featured 13 clubs which competed in the division last season, along with three new clubs:

- Eastbourne Town, transferred from the Athenian League
- Peacehaven & Telscombe, promoted from Division Two
- Selsey, promoted from Division Two

=== League table ===
Pos	Team	Pld	W	D	L	GF	GA	GR	Pts	Qualification or relegation
1	Eastbourne Town	30	18	8	4	51	21	2.429	44	
2	Southwick	30	17	7	6	45	25	1.800	41	
3	Burgess Hill Town	30	15	7	8	57	28	2.036	37	
4	Horsham YMCA	30	14	6	10	47	35	1.343	34	
5	Peacehaven & Telscombe	30	15	4	11	58	49	1.184	34	
6	Haywards Heath	30	13	8	9	45	40	1.125	34	
7	Ringmer	30	13	5	12	41	40	1.025	31	
8	Littlehampton Town	30	11	9	10	43	42	1.024	31	
9	Bexhill Town	30	13	3	14	40	46	0.870	29	
10	Wigmore Athletic	30	10	8	12	48	56	0.857	28	
11	Rye United	30	7	12	11	39	44	0.886	26	
12	East Grinstead	30	8	10	12	42	49	0.857	26	
13	Chichester City	30	11	4	15	40	47	0.851	26	
14	Selsey	30	9	7	14	34	57	0.596	25	
15	Three Bridges	30	5	8	17	32	55	0.582	18	Relegated to Division Two
16	Whitehawk	30	6	4	20	40	68	0.588	16	Relegated to Division Two

Source: nonleaguematters
Rules for classification: 1) points; 2) goal ratio.

== Division Two ==
Sussex County Football League Division Two
- Season: 1976–77
- Champions: Shoreham
- Promoted: Shoreham; Arundel
- Matches played: 182
- Goals scored: 582 (3.2 per match)

Division Two featured eleven clubs which competed in the division last season, along with three new clubs:

- Arundel, relegated from Division One
- Newhaven, relegated from Division One
- Storrington, joined from the West Sussex League

Also, Hastings & St Leonards changed name to Hastings Town.

=== League table ===
Pos	Team	Pld	W	D	L	GF	GA	GR	Pts	Qualification or relegation
1	Shoreham	26	19	2	5	62	30	2.067	40	Promoted to Division One
2	Arundel	26	18	3	5	49	23	2.130	39	Promoted to Division One
3	Steyning	26	16	5	5	65	32	2.031	37	
4	Hailsham Town	26	13	5	8	60	43	1.395	31	
5	Storrington	26	11	6	9	39	36	1.083	28	
6	Newhaven	26	10	7	9	43	42	1.024	27	
7	Sidley United	26	10	6	10	44	39	1.128	26	
8	Lancing	26	11	3	12	32	33	0.970	25	
9	Pagham	26	9	6	11	42	44	0.955	24	
10	Portfield	26	10	4	12	31	38	0.816	24	
11	Wick	26	5	10	11	31	41	0.756	20	
12	Hastings Town	26	6	5	15	35	47	0.745	15 (Note: Hastings Town were deducted two points.)	
13	Crowborough Athletic	26	5	4	17	22	67	0.328	14	
14	Seaford Town	26	3	6	17	27	67	0.403	10 (Note: Seaford Town were deducted two points.)	

Source: nonleaguematters
Rules for classification: 1) points; 2) goal ratio.
