= 1966–67 Sussex County Football League =

The 1966–67 Sussex County Football League season was the 42nd in the history of Sussex County Football League a football competition in England.

== Division One ==
Sussex County Football League Division One
- Season: 1966–67
- Champions: Bexhill Town Athletic
- Relegated: Whitehawk; Shoreham
- Matches played: 240
- Goals scored: 939 (3.91 per match)

Division One featured 14 clubs which competed in the division last season, along with two new clubs, promoted from Division Two:

- Horsham YMCA
- Newhaven

=== League table ===
Pos	Team	Pld	W	D	L	GF	GA	GR	Pts	Qualification or relegation
1	Bexhill Town Athletic	30	20	6	4	80	36	2.222	46	
2	Chichester City	30	17	8	5	97	49	1.980	42	
3	Sidley United	30	16	5	9	54	37	1.459	37	
4	Southwick	30	10	14	6	64	51	1.255	34	
5	Littlehampton Town	30	12	8	10	64	65	0.985	32	
6	Horsham YMCA	30	10	9	11	72	56	1.286	29	
7	Selsey	30	11	7	12	65	73	0.890	29	
8	East Grinstead	30	9	11	10	49	57	0.860	29	
9	Haywards Heath	30	9	10	11	50	49	1.020	28	
10	Rye United	30	10	8	12	54	67	0.806	28	
11	Bognor Regis Town	30	10	7	13	51	50	1.020	27	
12	Newhaven	30	10	7	13	55	62	0.887	27	
13	Lancing	30	10	7	13	56	87	0.644	27	
14	Seaford Town	30	8	9	13	45	63	0.714	25	
15	Whitehawk	30	8	8	14	51	63	0.810	24	Relegated to Division Two
16	Shoreham	30	5	6	19	32	74	0.432	16	Relegated to Division Two

Source: nonleaguematters
Rules for classification: 1) points; 2) goal ratio.

== Division Two ==
Sussex County Football League Division Two
- Season: 1966–67
- Champions: Wadhurst
- Promoted: Wadhurst; Arundel
- Matches played: 272
- Goals scored: 1,226 (4.51 per match)

Division Two featured 15 clubs which competed in the division last season, along with two new clubs, relegated from Division One:

- Arundel
- Wigmore Athletic

=== League table ===
Pos	Team	Pld	W	D	L	GF	GA	GR	Pts	Qualification or relegation
1	Wadhurst	32	22	6	4	99	36	2.750	50	Promoted to Division One
2	Arundel	32	18	9	5	103	58	1.776	45	Promoted to Division One
3	APV Athletic	32	18	7	7	107	48	2.229	43	
4	Hastings & St Leonards	32	16	9	7	84	54	1.556	41	
5	Wigmore Athletic	32	19	3	10	97	69	1.406	41	
6	Burgess Hill	32	14	9	9	62	47	1.319	37	
7	Ringmer	32	17	3	12	80	58	1.379	37	
8	Portfield	32	13	10	9	68	62	1.097	36	
9	Hastings Rangers	32	14	6	12	65	74	0.878	34	
10	Old Varndeanians	32	12	9	11	55	61	0.902	33	
11	Steyning	32	12	6	14	67	46	1.457	30	
12	Three Bridges	32	12	4	16	65	71	0.915	28	
13	Wick	32	10	6	16	64	63	1.016	26	
14	Brighton Old Grammarians	32	11	1	20	67	84	0.798	23	
15	Ferring	32	7	5	20	49	91	0.538	19	
16	Brighton North End	32	6	6	20	61	103	0.592	18	Resigned from the league
17	Battle Rangers	32	1	1	30	33	201	0.164	3	Resigned from the league

Source: nonleaguematters
Rules for classification: 1) points; 2) goal ratio.
