= 2011–12 Kent Invicta Football League =

Football league season

The 2011–12 Kent Invicta Football League season was the first in the history of the Kent Invicta Football League, a football competition in England based on the historic county of Kent.

The league comprised one division and there was also a league cup competition, the Challenge Trophy.

== The League ==
Kent Invicta Football League
- Season: 2011–12
- Champions: Bly Spartans
- Promoted: Bly Spartans
- Matches: 240
- Goals: 825 (3.44 per match)

Sixteen invited clubs participated in the league's inaugural season, they comprised fourteen from the previous season's Kent County League together with two additional clubs:-

- Clubs joined from Kent County League Premier Division:
  - Bearsted
  - Bly Spartans
  - Bridon Ropes
  - Hollands & Blair
  - Lewisham Borough
  - Phoenix Sports
  - Rusthall
  - Sutton Athletic
  - Woodstock Park
- Clubs joined from Kent County League Division One West:
  - Crockenhill
  - Orpington
- Club joined from Kent County League Division Two East:
  - Lydd Town
- Clubs joined from Kent County League Division Two West:
  - Meridian S & S
  - Seven Acre & Sidcup, who also changed their name from Seven Acre Sports
- Plus:
  - Ashford United, new club formed after Ashford Town (Kent) folded in 2010.
  - Erith & Dartford Town, joined from the South London Football Alliance

Bly Spartans won the league (part of a league and cup double) and were promoted to the Kent League.

=== League table ===
| Pos | Team | Pld | W | D | L | GF | GA | GD | Pts | Promotion |
|---|---|---|---|---|---|---|---|---|---|---|
| 1 | Bly Spartans | 30 | 17 | 9 | 4 | 75 | 33 | +42 | 60 | Promoted to the Kent League |
| 2 | Phoenix Sports | 30 | 17 | 7 | 6 | 60 | 30 | +30 | 58 | |
| 3 | Hollands & Blair | 30 | 17 | 4 | 9 | 66 | 30 | +36 | 55 | |
| 4 | Bridon Ropes | 30 | 16 | 7 | 7 | 57 | 38 | +19 | 55 | |
| 5 | Ashford United | 30 | 15 | 7 | 8 | 65 | 44 | +21 | 52 | |
| 6 | Sutton Athletic | 30 | 14 | 6 | 10 | 49 | 42 | +7 | 48 | |
| 7 | Bearsted | 30 | 11 | 11 | 8 | 40 | 34 | +6 | 44 | |
| 8 | Lewisham Borough | 30 | 13 | 4 | 13 | 48 | 42 | +6 | 43 | |
| 9 | Woodstock Park | 30 | 12 | 4 | 14 | 54 | 59 | −5 | 40 | |
| 10 | Seven Acre & Sidcup | 30 | 10 | 9 | 11 | 47 | 51 | −4 | 39 | |
| 11 | Rusthall | 30 | 10 | 3 | 17 | 39 | 58 | −19 | 33 | |
| 12 | Lydd Town | 30 | 9 | 5 | 16 | 51 | 64 | −13 | 32 | |
| 13 | Erith & Dartford Town | 30 | 9 | 5 | 16 | 38 | 65 | −27 | 32 | |
| 14 | Crockenhill | 30 | 9 | 4 | 17 | 43 | 83 | −40 | 31 | |
| 15 | Meridian S & S | 30 | 7 | 6 | 17 | 51 | 85 | −34 | 27 | |
| 16 | Orpington | 30 | 6 | 5 | 19 | 42 | 67 | −25 | 23 | |

Source: Non League Matters, FA Full-Time
Rules for classification: 1) points; 2) goal difference; 3) number of goals scored.

=== Results ===
| Home \ Away | ASH | BEA | BLY | BRI | CRO | ERI | H&B | LEW | LYD | MER | ORP | PHO | RUS | SEV | SUT | WOO |
|---|---|---|---|---|---|---|---|---|---|---|---|---|---|---|---|---|
| Ashford United | | 1–1 | 1–3 | 2–3 | 1–3 | 4–0 | 2–2 | 1–0 | 4–0 | 3–3 | 3–0 | 1–2 | 4–3 | 2–1 | 1–0 | 3–0 |
| Bearsted | 0–0 | | 0–1 | 1–0 | 4–0 | 1–0 | 3–0 | 0–0 | 1–1 | 2–1 | 3–0 | 1–1 | 2–1 | 1–1 | 1–1 | 3–3 |
| Bly Spartans | 4–5 | 1–0 | | 3–3 | 1–2 | 1–5 | 1–1 | 3–1 | 5–1 | 5–0 | 6–0 | 0–0 | 1–1 | 1–1 | 0–0 | 5–2 |
| Bridon Ropes | 4–3 | 2–1 | 1–1 | | 11–1 | 4–0 | 1–0 | 0–1 | 2–1 | 3–0 | 1–0 | 0–4 | 0–0 | 0–5 | 2–0 | 2–1 |
| Crockenhill | 2–5 | 2–1 | 0–4 | 0–0 | | 1–1 | 0–1 | 3–2 | 2–6 | 0–4 | 2–1 | 2–2 | 3–2 | 1–2 | 1–0 | 1–3 |
| Erith & Dartford Town | 2–2 | 0–1 | 0–4 | 2–1 | 2–1 | | 0–7 | 0–1 | 1–2 | 5–2 | 1–8 | 0–4 | 1–0 | 0–0 | 0–3 | 6–1 |
| Hollands & Blair | 1–0 | 0–1 | 1–2 | 1–3 | 5–0 | 3–2 | | 1–0 | 3–2 | 7–0 | 3–0 | 2–0 | 2–0 | 3–0 | 5–1 | 4–0 |
| Lewisham Borough | 1–2 | 1–1 | 0–3 | 0–2 | 4–1 | 2–0 | 1–1 | | 1–2 | 4–2 | 2–0 | 1–2 | 1–0 | 0–0 | 7–1 | 1–5 |
| Lydd Town | 0–1 | 4–2 | 1–1 | 1–3 | 3–4 | 0–2 | 1–0 | 2–4 | | 2–2 | 3–2 | 3–3 | 0–2 | 4–1 | 3–0 | 1–1 |
| Meridian S & S | 0–5 | 6–2 | 0–8 | 1–2 | 0–5 | 5–2 | 1–1 | 0–4 | 2–1 | | 1–1 | 0–3 | 5–0 | 1–2 | 1–2 | 1–1 |
| Orpington | 1–4 | 1–2 | 4–2 | 1–1 | 0–0 | 0–2 | 0–5 | 4–0 | 3–0 | 1–4 | | 2–1 | 3–0 | 2–2 | 1–2 | 0–3 |
| Phoenix Sports | 3–0 | 2–1 | 1–2 | 4–1 | 2–1 | 1–1 | 2–0 | 2–0 | 1–2 | 5–2 | 1–1 | | 2–0 | 1–3 | 1–0 | 3–0 |
| Rusthall | 0–3 | 1–0 | 2–4 | 1–1 | 2–0 | 0–2 | 1–0 | 3–2 | 2–1 | 4–2 | 4–3 | 0–2 | | 3–1 | 2–4 | 0–1 |
| Seven Acre & Sidcup | 1–1 | 1–1 | 0–2 | 1–1 | 2–0 | 3–0 | 2–3 | 0–4 | 3–0 | 2–2 | 3–2 | 1–3 | 3–0 | | 1–2 | 2–5 |
| Sutton Athletic | 1–1 | 1–1 | 0–1 | 0–3 | 6–2 | 0–0 | 4–3 | 0–1 | 2–1 | 2–0 | 5–1 | 1–1 | 3–0 | 5–0 | | 2–1 |
| Woodstock Park | 3–0 | 1–2 | 0–0 | 2–0 | 6–3 | 3–1 | 0–1 | 1–2 | 4–3 | 1–3 | 1–0 | 2–1 | 2–5 | 1–3 | 0–1 | |

Source: Non League Matters, FA Full-Time
Legend: Blue = home team win; Yellow = draw; Red = away team win.

== The Challenge Trophy ==
The 2011–12 Kent Invicta League Challenge Trophy, sponsored by Sandom Robinson, was won by Bly Spartans who completed the league and cup double.

The competition was contested by all 16 teams from the league over three single tie rounds to reach the final, played on a neutral ground (at Welling United this season).

=== First Round ===
Sixteen clubs competed in eight first round ties.

| Home team | Score | Away team |
|---|---|---|
| Phoenix Sports | 2 – 1 | Sutton Athletic |
| Ashford United | 5 – 0 | Lydd Town |
| Bearsted | 1 – 0 | Bridon Ropes |
| Erith & Dartford Town | 8 – 2 | Crockenhill |
| Orpington | 0 – 5 | Bly Spartans |
| Rusthall | 0 – 1 | Lewisham Borough |
| Seven Acre & Sidcup | 3 – 1 | Woodstock Park |
| Hollands & Blair | 5 – 1 | Meridian S & S |

=== Quarter-finals, Semi-finals and Final ===
Quarter-finals
Phoenix Sports | 5
Ashford United | 3
Bearsted | 0
Erith & Dartford Town | 2
Bly Spartans | 3
Lewisham Borough | 0
Seven Acre & Sidcup | 0
Hollands & Blair | 3

Semi-finals
Phoenix Sports | 3
Erith & Dartford Town | 2
Bly Spartans (Note: Bly Spartans won penalty shoot-out 4-3) | 0 (Note: After extra time) | 4p
Hollands & Blair | 0 | 3p

Final
Phoenix Sports | 2 (Note: After extra time (1–1 after 90 minutes)) | 2p
Bly Spartans (Note: Bly Spartans won penalty shoot-out 4-2) | 2 | 4p

Sources: "Kent Invicta Challenge Trophy, Sponsored by Sandom Robinson, 2011 - 12". Kent Invicta Football League. Archived from the original on 8 May 2013.; "2011–12 Kent Invicta League: League Cup". Football Club History Database.
