= 1975–76 Sussex County Football League =

The 1975–76 Sussex County Football League season was the 51st in the history of Sussex County Football League a football competition in England.

== Division One ==
Sussex County Football League Division One
- Season: 1975–76
- Champions: Burgess Hill Town
- Relegated: Arundel; Newhaven
- Matches played: 210
- Goals scored: 644 (3.07 per match)

Division One featured 13 clubs which competed in the division last season, along with two new clubs, promoted from Division Two:

- Burgess Hill Town
- Rye United

=== League table ===
Pos	Team	Pld	W	D	L	GF	GA	GR	Pts	Qualification or relegation
1	Burgess Hill Town	28	18	8	2	70	27	2.593	44	
2	Littlehampton Town	28	17	4	7	60	29	2.069	38	
3	Bexhill Town	28	16	6	6	59	33	1.788	36 (Note: Bexhill Town were deducted two points.)	
4	Southwick	28	14	8	6	54	34	1.588	36	
5	Haywards Heath	28	13	5	10	51	34	1.500	31	
6	Wigmore Athletic	28	13	3	12	56	47	1.191	29	
7	Whitehawk	28	10	9	9	39	36	1.083	29	
8	Horsham YMCA	28	10	8	10	40	40	1.000	28	
9	Ringmer	28	12	3	13	35	37	0.946	27	
10	East Grinstead	28	9	8	11	26	34	0.765	26	
11	Three Bridges	28	10	4	14	34	49	0.694	24	
12	Rye United	28	8	6	14	32	46	0.696	22	
13	Chichester City	28	6	8	14	29	47	0.617	20	
14	Arundel	28	4	6	18	27	62	0.435	14	Relegated to Division Two
15	Newhaven	28	4	6	18	32	89	0.360	14	Relegated to Division Two

Source: nonleaguematters
Rules for classification: 1) points; 2) goal ratio.

== Division Two ==
Sussex County Football League Division Two
- Season: 1975–76
- Champions: Selsey
- Promoted: Selsey; Peacehaven & Telscombe
- Matches played: 156
- Goals scored: 527 (3.38 per match)

Division Two featured ten clubs which competed in the division last season, along with three new clubs:

- Hailsham Town, joined from the Southern Counties Combination League
- Portfield, relegated from Division One
- Sidley United, relegated from Division One

=== League table ===
Pos	Team	Pld	W	D	L	GF	GA	GR	Pts	Qualification or relegation
1	Selsey	24	19	3	2	60	22	2.727	41	Promoted to Division One
2	Peacehaven & Telscombe	24	16	5	3	60	25	2.400	37	Promoted to Division One
3	Portfield	24	14	4	6	53	31	1.710	32	
4	Sidley United	24	11	6	7	41	33	1.242	28	
5	Shoreham	24	12	3	9	38	47	0.809	27	
6	Hailsham Town	24	10	4	10	57	48	1.188	24	
7	Steyning	24	8	7	9	38	36	1.056	23	
8	Hastings & St Leonards	24	8	4	12	40	47	0.851	20	
9	Wick	24	7	6	11	23	28	0.821	20	
10	Crowborough Athletic	24	7	5	12	42	48	0.875	16 (Note: Crowborough Athletic were deducted three points.)	
11	Lancing	24	5	5	14	23	42	0.548	15	
12	Pagham	24	6	3	15	31	61	0.508	15	
13	Seaford Town	24	4	3	17	21	59	0.356	11	

Source: nonleaguematters
Rules for classification: 1) points; 2) goal ratio.
