= 1973–74 Sussex County Football League =

The 1973–74 Sussex County Football League season was the 49th in the history of Sussex County Football League a football competition in England.

== Division One ==
Sussex County Football League Division One
- Season: 1973–74
- Champions: Newhaven
- Relegated: Shoreham; Rye United
- Matches played: 210
- Goals scored: 597 (2.84 per match)

Division One featured 13 clubs which competed in the division last season, along with two new clubs, promoted from Division Two:

- Portfield
- Shoreham

=== League table ===
Pos	Team	Pld	W	D	L	GF	GA	GR	Pts	Qualification or relegation
1	Newhaven	28	18	7	3	50	24	2.083	43	
2	Littlehampton Town	28	19	3	6	53	24	2.208	41	
3	Southwick	28	17	6	5	49	24	2.042	40	
4	Sidley United	28	14	7	7	48	34	1.412	35	
5	Haywards Heath	28	11	8	9	41	34	1.206	30	
6	Whitehawk	28	12	5	11	43	42	1.024	29	
7	Bexhill Town	28	11	5	12	42	46	0.913	27	
8	Portfield	28	10	6	12	40	40	1.000	26	
9	East Grinstead	28	10	5	13	36	44	0.818	25	
10	Arundel	28	9	7	12	34	43	0.791	25	
11	Chichester City	28	9	6	13	34	42	0.810	24	
12	Horsham YMCA	28	8	6	14	37	51	0.725	22	
13	Ringmer	28	9	4	15	32	46	0.696	22	
14	Shoreham	28	5	8	15	35	57	0.614	18	Relegated to Division Two
15	Rye United	28	4	5	19	23	46	0.500	13	Relegated to Division Two

Source: nonleaguematters
Rules for classification: 1) points; 2) goal ratio.

== Division Two ==
Sussex County Football League Division Two
- Season: 1973–74
- Champions: Wigmore Athletic
- Promoted: Wigmore Athletic; Three Bridges
- Matches played: 110
- Goals scored: 361 (3.28 per match)

Division Two featured nine clubs which competed in the division last season, along with two new clubs, relegated from Division One:

- Burgess Hill Town
- Three Bridges

=== League table ===
Pos	Team	Pld	W	D	L	GF	GA	GR	Pts	Qualification or relegation
1	Wigmore Athletic	20	11	7	2	46	27	1.704	29	Promoted to Division One
2	Three Bridges	20	12	4	4	41	23	1.783	28	Promoted to Division One
3	Seaford Town	20	9	6	5	38	23	1.652	24	
4	Peacehaven & Telscombe	20	11	2	7	36	42	0.857	24	
5	Burgess Hill Town	20	8	7	5	28	21	1.333	23	
6	Hastings & St Leonards	20	9	4	7	37	30	1.233	22	
7	Wick	20	6	4	10	29	30	0.967	16	
8	Pagham	20	4	8	8	31	33	0.939	16	
9	Lancing	20	7	1	12	26	39	0.667	15	
10	Selsey	20	5	2	13	28	51	0.549	12	
11	Steyning	20	2	7	11	21	42	0.500	11	

Source: nonleaguematters
Rules for classification: 1) points; 2) goal ratio.
