= 2012–13 Essex Senior Football League =

The 2012–13 season was the 42nd in the history of Essex Senior Football League a football competition in England.

The league featured 17 clubs which competed in the league last season, along with two new clubs:

- Great Wakering Rovers, relegated from the Isthmian League
- London Bari, joined from the Essex Corinthian Sunday Football League
- For this season only, the FA were to promote a second club from two of the following six Step 5 leagues: Combined Counties League, Eastern Counties League, Essex Senior League, Kent League, Spartan South Midlands League and the Sussex County League. This was to fulfil the expansion of the Isthmian League Divisions One North and South from 22 to 24 clubs each. The two clubs were to be promoted on a points per game basis, and the two runners-up with the best PPG were VCD Athletic (Kent Football League) and Guernsey (Combined Counties League). Three others – Aylesbury United (Spartan South Midlands League), Redhill (Sussex County League) and Barkingside (Essex Senior League) – were also confirmed as promoted by the FA on 17 May, due to resignations and non-promotions elsewhere.
- From this league, only Barking, Barkingside, Burnham Ramblers, Enfield 1893, Great Wakering Rovers, London Bari and Takeley have applied for promotion. However, Takeley failed the ground grading, and therefore could not have been promoted.

Burnham Ramblers were champions, winning their first Essex Senior League title and were promoted to the Isthmian League along with runners-up Barkingside. Both clubs never played in the Isthmian League previously.

== League table ==
Essex Senior Football League
- Season: 2012–13
- Champions: Burnham Ramblers
- Promoted: Barkingside; Burnham Ramblers
- Matches: 342
- Goals: 1,273 (3.72 per match)

Pos	Team	Pld	W	D	L	GF	GA	GD	Pts	Promotion or relegation
1	Burnham Ramblers	36	25	7	4	92	46	+46	82	Promoted to the Isthmian League
2	Barkingside	36	22	7	7	72	40	+32	73	Promoted to the Isthmian League
3	Takeley	36	22	7	7	90	52	+38	70 (Note: Takeley and Eton Manor were deducted three points each.)	
4	Great Wakering Rovers	36	19	8	9	97	54	+43	65	
5	Eton Manor	36	20	5	11	86	61	+25	62	
6	Barking	36	17	9	10	71	49	+22	60	
7	Southend Manor	36	15	11	10	76	50	+26	56	
8	Haringey & Waltham Development	36	15	8	13	70	65	+5	53	
9	Enfield 1893	36	14	9	13	66	60	+6	51	
10	London Bari	36	13	12	11	63	60	+3	51	
11	Sporting Bengal United	36	11	11	14	79	96	−17	44	
12	Bethnal Green United	36	11	10	15	61	73	−12	43	
13	Basildon United	36	12	5	19	53	80	−27	41	
14	Sawbridgeworth Town	36	10	9	17	70	90	−20	39	
15	Hullbridge Sports	36	9	8	19	53	70	−17	35	
16	London APSA	36	8	11	17	47	72	−25	35	
17	Stansted	36	7	13	16	48	69	−21	34	
18	Clapton	36	3	12	21	37	77	−40	21	
19	Bowers & Pitsea	36	4	8	24	42	109	−67	20	

Source: FA Full-Time, mitoo
Rules for classification: 1) points; 2) goal difference; 3) number of goals scored.
