= 2012–13 Kent Football League =

The 2012–13 Kent Football League season (known as the 2012–13 Hurlimann Kent Football League for sponsorship reasons) was the 47th in the history of Kent Football League, a football competition in England.

At the end of the season the league changed its name to the Southern Counties East Football League, to reflect that many of its member clubs no longer played within the county boundaries of Kent.

The League structure comprised two divisions: a Premier Division and Division One – the latter was known as the Reserves Section, comprising reserves teams which were not permitted in the Premier Division. Additionally there were two league cup competitions, the Challenge Cup for the Premier Division clubs and another for the teams in the Reserves Section.

== Premier Division ==
Kent Football League Premier Division
- Season: 2012–13
- Champions: Erith & Belvedere
- Promoted: Erith & Belvedere; VCD Athletic
- Matches: 272
- Goals: 1,050 (3.86 per match)

The division comprised teams from17 clubs, 15 from the previous season together with two additional clubs:

- Rochester United (formerly Bly Spartans), promoted from the Kent Invicta League
- Whyteleafe, relegated from the Isthmian League

Owing to expansion of the Isthmian League Divisions One North and South from 22 to 24 clubs for the following season two clubs, selected on a points per game (PPG) basis, from the following six Step 5 leagues were to be promoted: Combined Counties League, Eastern Counties League, Essex Senior League, Kent League, Spartan South Midlands League and the Sussex County League. From the Kent Premier League Erith & Belvedere (who were promoted as champions), Erith Town, Tunbridge Wells, VCD Athletic and Whyteleafe applied for promotion. Subsequently, VCD Athletic were promoted as one of the two runners-up with the best PPG.

=== League table ===
Pos	Team	Pld	W	D	L	GF	GA	GD	Pts	Promotion
1	Erith & Belvedere	32	23	7	2	113	45	+68	76	Promoted to the Isthmian League Division One North
2	VCD Athletic	32	23	5	4	97	31	+66	74	Promoted to the Isthmian League Division One North
3	Erith Town	32	19	4	9	74	40	+34	61	
4	Corinthian	32	17	8	7	74	37	+37	59	
5	Lordswood	32	17	7	8	60	56	+4	58	
6	Whyteleafe	32	16	6	10	67	49	+18	54	
7	Tunbridge Wells	32	15	7	10	82	43	+39	52	
8	Cray Valley Paper Mills	32	13	8	11	63	58	+5	47	
9	Canterbury City	32	12	7	13	52	58	−6	43	
10	Woodstock Sports	32	12	7	13	59	76	−17	43	
11	Beckenham Town	32	11	7	14	63	73	−10	40	
12	Deal Town	32	11	6	15	58	65	−7	39	
13	Rochester United	32	12	2	18	52	70	−18	38	
14	Fisher	32	7	7	18	41	71	−30	28	
15	Greenwich Borough	32	6	5	21	33	93	−60	23	
16	Holmesdale	32	5	6	21	34	83	−49	21	
17	Sevenoaks Town	32	3	1	28	28	102	−74	10	

Source: FA Full-Time, Kent League (archived)
Rules for classification: 1) points; 2) goal difference; 3) number of goals scored.

=== Results ===
Home \ Away	BEC	CAN	COR	CVP	DEA	E&B	ERI	FIS	GRE	HOL	LOR	ROC	SEV	TUN	VCD	WHY	WOO
Beckenham Town		1–3	1–0	2–0	3–0	0–6	2–2	1–2	4–3	1–1	3–1	2–3	3–5	5–4	0–7	3–1	0–1
Canterbury City	1–1		1–0	2–2	2–1	2–2	3–0	1–0	1–0	2–0	1–2	3–1	3–0	1–3	3–0	1–3	6–1
Corinthian	3–3	4–1		3–1	6–0	1–1	2–1	6–1	3–1	2–3	1–2	4–1	4–0	1–0	1–1	1–2	2–2
Cray Valley Paper Mills	2–2	5–0	1–1		3–3	1–2	1–5	0–2	3–1	0–0	3–0	4–1	3–1	1–9	0–2	2–0	2–4
Deal Town	5–4	4–1	1–2	1–0		1–2	1–3	3–2	6–0	5–1	0–1	3–1	5–0	2–4	1–2	0–3	1–1
Erith & Belvedere	3–2	3–2	4–2	4–4	5–2		3–1	3–2	7–0	3–3	3–3	6–1	4–0	2–0	2–2	1–2	8–5
Erith Town	3–1	3–2	0–1	0–4	2–0	4–3		4–3	8–0	4–0	1–2	4–1	3–0	0–0	0–2	3–0	2–3
Fisher	1–2	0–2	0–3	0–2	1–1	0–6	0–1		1–1	2–3	2–5	1–1	1–0	1–2	0–5	0–2	3–1
Greenwich Borough	2–2	1–0	0–0	2–3	0–4	0–4	0–3	1–4		2–1	0–3	1–3	1–0	2–6	1–6	0–2	2–0
Holmesdale	1–1	2–2	0–4	3–3	3–1	0–3	0–2	0–3	2–4		0–3	1–2	2–1	1–2	0–1	0–5	0–2
Lordswood	1–0	1–0	1–1	4–0	3–0	0–0	0–4	1–1	2–2	4–1		3–1	2–1	1–4	0–0	2–4	2–2
Rochester United	0–3	2–1	0–3	0–2	1–2	0–3	1–1	1–2	2–1	3–0	3–0		4–2	1–2	1–2	3–1	2–1
Sevenoaks Town	2–6	1–1	2–4	1–6	0–1	0–5	0–3	4–0	0–1	2–3	1–3	1–4		0–6	1–4	1–5	1–3
Tunbridge Wells	3–2	6–0	1–2	0–0	2–2	2–3	1–1	1–1	5–1	5–0	2–3	3–2	0–1		0–2	2–3	1–1
VCD Athletic	5–1	5–0	3–0	1–0	1–1	2–4	0–2	2–2	6–2	4–1	9–2	1–4	4–0	1–0		2–0	6–0
Whyteleafe	1–2	2–2	2–2	0–2	1–1	0–4	2–3	4–1	1–1	3–1	4–0	5–1	3–0	0–0	1–4		2–2
Woodstock Sports	1–0	2–2	0–5	2–3	5–0	1–4	2–1	2–2	1–0	2–1	2–3	2–1	5–0	0–6	1–5	2–3	

Source: FA Full-Time, Kent League (archived)
Legend: Blue = home team win; Yellow = draw; Red = away team win.

=== Challenge Cup ===
The 2012–13 Kent Football League Challenge Cup, known as the Macron Kent League Cup (to reflect sponsorship by the Macron Sportswear brand), was won by Erith & Belvedere to complete a League and Cup double.

The competition was contested by the 17 teams from the Premier Division and was played over a total of five rounds: four on an aggregate basis (home and away matches) followed by a final match played on a neutral ground (at Welling United F.C. this season).

==== Quarter-finals, Semi-finals and Final ====
Quarter-finals
Cray Valley Paper Mills	1	0	1
Deal Town	2	1	3
Corinthian	1	5	6
Holmesdale	0	0	0
Erith & Belvedere	1	1	2
Whyteleafe	0	0	0
Lordswood	4	1	5
Tunbridge Wells	1	1	2

Semi-finals
Deal Town	0	0	0
Corinthian	3	5	8
Erith & Belvedere	3	0	3
Lordswood	0	1	1

Final
Corinthian	1
Erith & Belvedere	4

==== First Round ====
- VCD Athletic 1 – 3 Corinthian (1st Leg 0–1; 2nd Leg 1–2)
- Holmesdale 7 – 4 Rochester United (1st Leg 1–0; 2nd Leg 6–4)
- Cray Valley Paper Mills 5 – 3 Erith Town (1st Leg 2–2; 2nd Leg 3–1)
- Fisher 1 – 7 Deal Town (1st Leg 1–1; 2nd Leg 0–6)
- Erith & Belvedere 6 – 1 Greenwich Borough (1st Leg 3–0; 2nd Leg 3–1)
- Sevenoaks Town 3 – 5 Whyteleafe (1st Leg 3–1; 2nd Leg 0–4)
- Canterbury City 3 – 5 Lordswood (1st Leg 3–1; 2nd Leg 0–4)
- Tunbridge Wells 3 – 2 Woodstock Sports (1st Leg 2–1; 2nd Leg 1–1)

==== Preliminary Round ====
- Beckenham Town 3 – 4 Erith Town (1st Leg 2–2; 2nd Leg 1–2)

Source: SCEFL Archives

== Reserves Section ==
The letter "R" following team names indicates a club’s reserves team.

The 2012–13 season Reserves Section comprised a single division (amalgamated from the previous season's two). Promotion from the Reserves Section into the Premier Division was not permitted. There was a League Cup competition for the teams of the Reserves Section.

=== Division One ===
Kent Football League Division One
- Season: 2012–13
- Champions: Whitstable Town R
- Matches: 182
- Goals: 781 (4.29 per match)

The division comprised 14 teams, six of which competed in the previous season together with seven from the previous season's Division Two plus one additional team, Rusthall R.

At the end of the season the division was discontinued.

==== League table ====
Pos	Team	Pld	W	D	L	GF	GA	GD	Pts
1	Whitstable Town R	26	19	3	4	86	28	+58	60
2	Herne Bay R (Note: Herne Bay R v. VCD Athletic R match: win awarded to Herne Bay R (0–0))	26	16	5	5	68	40	+28	53
3	Maidstone United R	26	15	5	6	80	52	+28	50
4	Chatham Town R (Note: Deal Town R v. Chatham Town R match: win awarded to Deal Town R (0–0))	26	13	7	6	55	32	+23	46
5	Erith Town R	26	13	6	7	56	40	+16	45
6	Ramsgate R	26	12	4	10	55	54	+1	40
7	Deal Town R	26	10	4	12	49	55	−6	34
8	Holmesdale R	26	9	6	11	61	60	+1	33
9	VCD Athletic R (Note: Herne Bay R v. VCD Athletic R match: win awarded to Herne Bay R (0–0); Margate R v. VCD Athletic R match: win awarded to Margate R (0–0))	26	11	0	15	57	60	−3	30 (Note: VCD Athletic R deducted three points.)
10	Phoenix Sports R	26	9	2	15	60	66	−6	29
11	Margate R (Note: Margate R v. VCD Athletic R match: win awarded to Margate R (0–0))	26	8	5	13	47	57	−10	29
12	Woodstock Sports R	26	8	5	13	41	75	−34	29
13	Lordswood R	26	6	6	14	40	62	−22	24
14	Rusthall R	26	4	0	22	26	100	−74	12

Source: Kent League (archived)
Rules for classification: 1) points; 2) goal difference; 3) number of goals scored.

==== Results ====
Home \ Away	CHA	DEA	ERI	HER	HOL	LOR	MAI	MAR	PHO	RAM	RUS	VCD	WHI	WOO
Chatham Town R		5–0	1–1	0–0	1–0	2–2	1–2	2–2	2–1	2–2	3–0	3–0	2–0	1–1
Deal Town R	– (Note: Match awarded to Deal Town R (0–0))		0–2	0–1	2–2	2–1	5–0	1–3	2–1	5–1	3–0	1–2	2–4	7–1
Erith Town R	0–1	0–2		1–4	1–1	1–1	4–1	2–1	2–1	4–2	4–0	3–1	2–0	7–0
Herne Bay R	4–1	2–2	4–2		2–2	4–1	5–0	5–2	4–1	4–2	2–1	– (Note: Match awarded to Herne Bay R (0–0))	3–0	3–3
Holmesdale R	1–4	3–4	1–2	2–0		3–0	2–2	3–1	5–6	1–2	6–1	3–1	1–1	3–2
Lordswood R	2–1	1–0	0–3	0–1	5–4		0–3	2–2	1–0	3–1	8–0	2–3	0–6	0–2
Maidstone United R	5–2	9–0	3–3	5–1	5–4	1–1		2–2	5–3	4–0	6–1	3–2	0–1	6–1
Margate R	0–2	3–1	2–3	3–1	3–5	1–1	2–3		1–5	1–1	4–1	– (Note: Match awarded to Margate R (0–0))	1–2	2–1
Phoenix Sports R	3–1	3–3	1–1	2–6	1–3	3–1	1–4	4–1		5–3	2–1	0–4	1–3	9–0
Ramsgate R	0–4	2–1	2–3	3–2	1–1	4–1	2–2	3–2	2–0		7–0	3–0	1–5	0–2
Rusthall R	0–3	1–4	3–1	1–4	0–3	5–2	2–3	0–2	0–4	0–3		2–4	0–12	1–5
VCD Athletic R	2–5	5–1	3–2	2–3	4–1	6–2	0–5	3–1	4–1	0–2	2–3		2–8	6–0
Whitstable Town R	3–3	2–0	4–1	2–1	6–0	2–2	4–0	2–0	4–1	1–2	3–2	3–0		5–1
Woodstock Sports R	1–3	1–1	1–1	2–2	3–1	2–1	3–1	2–5	3–1	1–4	0–1	3–1	0–3	

Source: FA Full-Time & Kent League (archived) & Final Table, Kent League (archived)
Legend: Blue = home team win; Yellow = draw; Red = away team win.

=== Reserves Cup ===
The 2012–13 Kent Football League Reserves Cup was won by Phoenix Sports R.

The competition was contested by the 14 teams from Division One and was played over four rounds: the first two comprised single knock-out matches, followed by the semi-finals, which were decided on an aggregate basis (home and away matches), and culminated in the final match, played on a neutral ground (at Corinthian F.C. this season).

==== Quarter-finals, Semi-finals and Final ====
Quarter-finals
VCD Athletic R	3
Maidstone United R	1
Phoenix Sports R	5
Erith Town R	3
Whitstable Town R	2
Ramsgate R	0
Herne Bay R	2
Woodstock Sports R	1

Semi-finals
VCD Athletic R	0	0	0
Phoenix Sports R	1	0	1
Whitstable Town R	1	1	2
Herne Bay R	1	2	3

Final
Phoenix Sports R	3
Herne Bay R	2

==== First Round ====
- VCD Athletic R 5 – 1 Margate R
- Lordswood R 0 – 4 Maidstone United R
- Erith Town R 4 – 1 Holmesdale R
- Whitstable Town R 5 – 0 Rusthall R
- Herne Bay R 2 – 1 Chatham Town R
- Woodstock Sports R 7 – 4 Deal Town R

Bye to next round: Phoenix Sports R and Ramsgate R

Source: Kent League Archived
