= 2012–13 Sussex County Football League =

The 2012–13 Sussex County Football League season was the 88th in the history of Sussex County Football League a football competition in England.

== Division One ==
Sussex County Football League Division One
- Season: 2012–13
- Champions: Peacehaven & Telscombe
- Promoted: Peacehaven & Telscombe; Redhill
- Matches: 462
- Goals: 1,754 (3.8 per match)

Division One featured 19 clubs which competed in the division last season, along with three new clubs, promoted from Division Two:

- Dorking Wanderers
- East Preston
- Hailsham Town

For this season only, the FA were to promote a second club from two of the following six Step 5 leagues: Combined Counties League, Eastern Counties League, Essex Senior League, Kent League, Spartan South Midlands League and the Sussex County League. This was to fulfil the expansion of the Isthmian League Divisions One North and South from 22 to 24 clubs each. The two clubs were to be promoted on a points per game basis, and the two runners-up with the best PPG were VCD Athletic (Kent Football League) and Guernsey (Combined Counties League). Three others – Aylesbury United (Spartan South Midlands League), Redhill (Sussex County League) and Barkingside (Essex Senior League) – were also confirmed as promoted by the FA on 17 May, due to resignations and non-promotions elsewhere.

- From this league, only Horsham YMCA, Peacehaven & Telscombe and Redhill applied for promotion.

=== League table ===
Pos	Team	Pld	W	D	L	GF	GA	GD	Pts	Qualification or relegation
1	Peacehaven & Telscombe	42	28	10	4	114	35	+79	94	Promoted to the Isthmian League Division One South
2	Redhill	42	29	6	7	95	42	+53	93	Promoted to the Isthmian League Division One South
3	East Preston	42	25	10	7	97	50	+47	85	
4	Rye United	42	24	11	7	117	57	+60	83	
5	Pagham	42	26	5	11	90	52	+38	83	
6	Lingfield	42	23	7	12	102	78	+24	76	
7	Hassocks	42	21	7	14	97	69	+28	70	
8	East Grinstead Town	42	21	6	15	97	65	+32	69	
9	Ringmer	42	20	9	13	76	68	+8	69	
10	Horsham YMCA	42	19	7	16	97	71	+26	64	
11	St Francis Rangers	42	17	8	17	76	73	+3	59	
12	Hailsham Town	42	17	2	23	77	90	−13	53	
13	Lancing	42	14	10	18	80	75	+5	52	
14	Arundel	42	14	8	20	61	86	−25	50	
15	Crowborough Athletic	42	15	5	22	68	99	−31	50	
16	Sidley United	42	13	7	22	67	87	−20	46	Resigned from the league
17	Shoreham	42	14	4	24	69	106	−37	46	
18	Selsey	42	11	12	19	53	76	−23	45	
19	Chichester City	42	12	6	24	63	107	−44	42	
20	Dorking Wanderers	42	10	11	21	62	80	−18	41	
21	AFC Uckfield	42	5	4	33	53	141	−88	19	Voluntary demoted to Division Two
22	Worthing United	42	3	7	32	43	147	−104	16	

Source: League Official
Rules for classification: 1) points; 2) goal difference; 3) number of goals scored.

=== Results ===
Home \ Away	AFU	ARU	CHI	CRW	DOW	EGT	EPR	HAI	HAS	HYM	LAN	LIN	PAG	PET	RED	RIN	RYE	SEL	SHO	SID	STF	WOR
AFC Uckfield		3–3	4–5	3–3	4–0	2–2	0–4	1–2	1–3	0–5	4–1	0–3	0–3	1–3	1–2	1–4	2–3	4–0	0–2	2–9	1–0	2–3
Arundel	2–0		2–3	3–2	3–2	0–2	1–1	0–0	2–3	1–1	2–1	1–0	0–3	1–3	0–2	1–1	2–4	3–0	2–0	2–1	1–3	1–0
Chichester City	0–2	0–0		3–2	2–2	1–4	1–4	2–3	2–2	3–6	0–0	0–3	2–4	3–1	0–2	2–1	1–4	3–1	5–4	2–2	2–1	3–0
Crowborough Athletic	3–1	2–1	2–1		0–4	0–3	2–3	2–1	1–3	2–1	0–3	2–3	0–0	1–1	1–2	2–3	0–2	2–1	1–0	2–1	3–2	6–2
Dorking Wanderers	1–1	1–2	3–1	3–0		1–0	2–2	0–1	1–3	1–2	3–0	1–4	1–2	1–1	1–4	1–2	1–5	1–2	4–1	2–0	3–2	7–0
East Grinstead Town	2–0	1–0	5–0	7–0	6–2		0–1	7–3	0–1	1–1	1–1	1–2	0–3	1–3	0–2	2–3	2–1	4–0	6–1	1–1	3–0	2–1
East Preston	2–1	2–1	3–0	6–2	1–3	5–1		2–1	0–3	2–0	2–1	6–2	1–2	2–2	0–2	2–0	1–4	1–1	4–0	3–0	3–2	H/W (Note: (1 Apr 2013, Postponed) : Worthing United unable to raise team - (30 Apr 2013) : It is posted on the official site as home win 0-0.)
Hailsham Town	4–0	2–4	3–2	5–1	3–1	0–2	0–7		3–2	0–1	2–0	1–4	0–2	2–6	0–1	4–0	2–6	3–1	3–5	0–1	1–3	6–2
Hassocks	6–1	2–2	3–2	6–1	0–0	6–1	3–2	2–1		1–3	3–1	0–1	0–2	0–1	0–5	1–2	3–1	0–2	2–1	5–0	5–0	4–0
Horsham YMCA	8–0	6–1	5–2	6–1	1–1	1–4	0–1	2–1	5–0		3–1	1–3	5–3	0–0	0–1	0–2	2–0	2–2	0–2	2–1	3–0	6–1
Lancing	7–1	3–1	4–0	3–2	6–1	4–2	1–3	3–1	0–0	3–1		1–2	0–3	0–1	1–1	2–0	3–4	2–2	5–3	2–1	0–0	1–1
Lingfield	4–0	1–1	3–1	3–3	4–2	3–1	2–3	2–2	1–1	3–2	2–1		2–2	0–6	2–1	2–2	5–0	2–0	6–2	2–0	4–1	8–2
Pagham	4–2	4–3	2–0	3–2	3–1	1–2	1–1	3–1	4–1	4–2	2–1	3–0		2–1	0–1	1–2	0–1	3–1	2–0	2–3	1–2	4–3
Peacehaven & Telscombe	5–2	7–0	3–1	2–0	1–1	4–1	3–3	0–1	2–1	5–0	1–3	4–2	1–0		4–0	4–0	0–0	2–0	2–0	9–1	1–1	6–1
Redhill	4–1	5–1	5–2	2–0	2–2	2–0	2–2	H/W (Note: (6 May 2013, Postponed) : Hailsham Town unable to field a team - (11 May 2013) : It is posted on the official site as home win 0-0.)	3–1	2–1	3–3	4–1	4–0	1–2		2–1	1–4	0–3	1–0	1–1	1–0	9–0
Ringmer	1–0	0–2	1–2	1–0	3–0	2–2	1–1	1–4	1–5	3–3	3–0	5–1	1–0	0–3	0–4		2–0	2–2	5–3	4–1	1–0	8–1
Rye United	9–1	4–0	5–0	1–2	0–0	3–1	0–0	2–1	3–3	5–1	5–3	4–1	1–1	1–1	2–2	0–1		3–3	5–1	6–0	6–2	3–0
Selsey	5–0	1–0	1–1	0–3	0–0	0–0	1–3	0–1	3–2	3–3	1–5	2–1	1–1	0–1	0–2	2–0	0–3		2–1	1–1	1–4	3–2
Shoreham	4–3	1–3	3–0	1–3	2–1	0–6	0–6	4–3	2–2	2–1	1–1	2–1	0–3	1–5	0–4	1–1	1–1	3–0		5–1	2–0	3–1
Sidley United	3–0	4–2	0–1	1–3	2–0	0–2	0–1	1–2	4–1	0–3	2–1	3–4	2–0	0–0	2–0	1–3	1–2	1–1	2–1		2–2	6–1
St Francis Rangers	4–0	2–0	2–1	1–1	2–0	1–2	1–0	4–1	2–3	2–0	4–1	2–2	1–4	0–3	3–2	2–2	2–2	1–0	3–1	3–2		8–1
Worthing United	3–1	3–4	0–1	1–3	0–0	3–7	1–1	1–3	0–5	1–2	1–1	2–1	0–3	0–4	0–1	1–1	2–2	0–4	0–3	1–3	1–1	

Source: League Official
Legend: Blue = home team win; Yellow = draw; Red = away team win.

== Division Two ==
Sussex County Football League Division Two
- Season: 2012–13
- Champions: Littlehampton Town
- Promoted: Littlehampton Town; Newhaven
- Matches: 306
- Goals: 1,231 (4.02 per match)

Division Two featured 15 clubs which competed in the division last season, along with three new clubs, promoted from Division Three:

- Broadbridge Heath
- Newhaven
- Saltdean United

=== League table ===
Pos	Team	Pld	W	D	L	GF	GA	GD	Pts	Promotion or relegation
1	Littlehampton Town	34	26	4	4	91	27	+64	82	Promoted to Division One
2	Newhaven	34	22	4	8	90	52	+38	70	Promoted to Division One
3	Little Common	34	21	5	8	94	43	+51	68	
4	Eastbourne United	34	20	5	9	97	64	+33	65	
5	Westfield	34	17	7	10	67	56	+11	58	
6	Broadbridge Heath	34	17	4	13	82	62	+20	55	
7	Mile Oak	34	15	8	11	65	57	+8	53	
8	Midhurst & Easebourne	34	14	9	11	80	73	+7	51	
9	Loxwood	34	14	7	13	57	60	−3	49	
10	Steyning Town	34	14	6	14	73	61	+12	48	
11	Bexhill United	34	12	10	12	67	71	−4	46	
12	Seaford Town	34	12	8	14	64	64	0	44	
13	Storrington	34	12	7	15	50	67	−17	43	
14	Southwick	34	9	4	21	58	75	−17	31	Voluntary demoted to Division Three
15	Oakwood	34	8	7	19	62	88	−26	31	
16	Wick	34	8	7	19	44	74	−30	31	
17	Rustington	34	7	8	19	53	81	−28	29	
18	Saltdean United	34	2	2	30	37	156	−119	8	

Source: League Official
Rules for classification: 1) points; 2) goal difference; 3) number of goals scored.

=== Results ===
Home \ Away	BEX	BRH	EUA	LIC	LIT	LOX	M&E	MIO	NEW	OAK	RUS	SAL	SEA	SOU	STE	STO	WES	WIC
Bexhill United		1–5	1–2	2–1	2–2	1–3	2–1	2–0	2–3	1–1	1–1	9–3	3–3	5–2	1–2	2–2	2–3	2–2
Broadbridge Heath	1–1		0–3	3–4	3–2	1–2	2–1	1–1	3–4	5–0	3–1	6–0	2–2	3–1	3–2	5–2	2–1	3–0
Eastbourne United	2–2	6–1		3–0	3–1	3–1	2–3	2–0	5–1	7–1	0–1	5–0	3–2	2–2	4–2	6–0	3–2	1–2
Little Common	4–1	1–1	3–2		3–1	5–0	2–2	3–0	3–5	1–1	2–0	14–0	3–1	1–0	1–1	3–0	6–1	2–0
Littlehampton Town	4–1	5–2	2–0	4–0		1–1	5–1	2–2	1–0	5–0	3–2	3–0	2–0	2–0	5–0	3–0	2–0	6–0
Loxwood	0–1	0–2	4–2	2–5	0–4		1–1	1–1	3–2	3–1	3–1	7–1	0–5	3–1	2–2	4–1	1–2	0–0
Midhurst & Easebourne	4–0	2–0	2–2	1–1	0–2	4–2		1–3	6–1	1–4	6–1	6–4	0–0	4–3	1–6	2–5	2–1	6–0
Mile Oak	3–1	2–1	2–2	2–4	2–0	0–3	3–5		3–2	1–1	3–2	2–3	1–4	2–1	3–3	1–2	2–1	3–1
Newhaven	1–2	3–2	7–0	3–1	0–2	1–0	5–2	1–1		2–0	2–0	3–0	1–2	5–1	1–1	3–0	2–0	2–1
Oakwood	4–2	2–5	2–5	1–3	1–3	1–3	3–4	1–2	1–5		4–1	2–1	3–3	1–1	3–2	1–1	3–5	1–2
Rustington	1–1	2–1	3–3	0–2	1–2	4–1	1–1	0–3	2–4	1–5		8–1	1–3	3–0	1–3	2–1	2–2	1–3
Saltdean United	2–4	1–3	2–3	0–8	1–4	0–4	1–1	0–4	1–4	3–1	3–5		0–4	1–7	1–4	0–3	1–2	2–2 (Note: (13 Apr 2013) : Abandoned 75 mins - Result has been confirmed.)
Seaford Town	1–3	4–3	2–3	1–2	0–4	0–0	1–2	3–2	0–3	0–4	2–2	4–1		3–3	0–1	0–2	2–2	3–1
Southwick	3–4	1–2	1–2	2–1	1–2	2–0	1–5	0–1	1–4	1–4	2–0	2–1	0–2		2–1	2–2	1–3	6–1
Steyning Town	0–1	0–4	4–0	2–0	0–2	4–0	5–0	1–1	3–3	3–1	7–0	4–2	2–3	0–3		1–0	2–4	2–0
Storrington	2–2	2–3	3–1	1–0	0–2	0–1	0–0	2–6	1–4	2–1	2–1	2–0	3–1	1–4	4–2		1–2	2–1
Westfield	3–1	2–1	3–5	0–1	0–0	1–1	1–0	1–0	2–3	2–2	1–1	8–1	2–1	1–0	3–1	0–0		3–2
Wick	0–1	1–0	2–5	0–4	1–3	0–1	3–3	0–3	0–0	2–1	1–1	8–0	0–2	3–1	2–0	1–1	2–3	

Source: League Official
Legend: Blue = home team win; Yellow = draw; Red = away team win.

== Division Three ==
Sussex County Football League Division Three
- Season: 2012–13
- Champions: Sidlesham
- Promoted: Haywards Heath Town
- Relegated: TD Shipley
- Matches: 132
- Goals: 509 (3.86 per match)

Division Three featured ten clubs which competed in the division last season, along with two new clubs, joined from the West Sussex League:

- Billingshurst
- Sidlesham

Also, Ifield Edwards changed name to Ifield.

=== League table ===
Pos	Team	Pld	W	D	L	GF	GA	GD	Pts	Promotion
1	Sidlesham	22	17	3	2	71	23	+48	54	
2	Haywards Heath Town	22	16	5	1	59	13	+46	53	Promoted to Division Two
3	Barnham	22	14	3	5	73	30	+43	45	Merged with Wick
4	Billingshurst	22	10	5	7	45	37	+8	35	
5	Clymping	22	9	5	8	35	29	+6	32	
6	Uckfield Town	22	9	5	8	41	43	−2	32	
7	Ferring	22	9	7	6	51	45	+6	31 (Note: Deducted three points for fielding an ineligible player.)	
8	Roffey	22	6	4	12	33	50	−17	22	
9	Hurstpierpoint	22	6	4	12	24	42	−18	22	
10	Ifield	22	4	5	13	34	52	−18	17	
11	Rottingdean Village	22	4	2	16	28	76	−48	14	
12	TD Shipley	22	3	2	17	15	69	−54	11	Relegated to the West Sussex League

Source: League Official
Rules for classification: 1) points; 2) goal difference; 3) number of goals scored.

=== Results ===
Home \ Away	BAR	BIL	CLY	FER	HHT	HUR	IFI	ROF	ROT	SID	TDS	UCK
Barnham		4–2	1–0	7–1	1–5	2–0	1–1	4–1	9–1	1–2	5–1	2–2
Billingshurst	2–5		2–0	3–2	0–5	4–0	1–1	3–1	3–1	1–1	5–0	1–3
Clymping	0–4	0–3		0–0	0–2	2–1	3–1	0–2	6–1	0–3	7–0	5–2
Ferring	1–3	2–2	1–1		2–2	3–0	3–2	1–1	3–1	1–4	6–1	8–1
Haywards Heath Town	1–1	1–2	1–0	1–1		2–1	6–0	2–2	4–0	1–0	2–0	4–0
Hurstpierpoint	2–1	1–0	1–1	2–3	0–5		0–0	0–0	4–1	0–3	3–0	0–3
Ifield	2–5	1–1	0–1	6–1	0–2	1–2		1–2	2–4	0–4	1–2	2–1
Roffey	2–3	0–5	0–1	0–4	0–2	3–2	1–2		3–0	2–4	0–2	2–2
Rottingdean Village	0–6	5–0	1–3	1–3	0–3	2–2	1–5	4–2		0–4	0–3	1–1
Sidlesham	2–1	2–0	3–3	3–3	2–3	3–0	4–1	6–1	9–1		2–0	5–2
TD Shipley	0–7	0–0	0–3	0–1	1–1	0–3	2–5	1–4	0–3	1–3		1–6
Uckfield Town	2–0	2–5	0–0	4–1	0–3	3–0	1–1	2–0	2–0	1–2	1–0	

Source: League Official
Legend: Blue = home team win; Yellow = draw; Red = away team win.
