= Sittingbourne Community F.C. =

Association football club in England

Coordinates: 51°18′54″N 0°43′46″E

Sittingbourne Community
- Full name: Sittingbourne Community Football Club
- Founded: 2002
- Dissolved: 2016
- Ground: Woodstock Park; Sittingbourne, Kent
| Home colours | Away colours |

Sittingbourne Community F.C. was an English football club located near Sittingbourne, Kent. They were founded in 2002 as Woodstock Park F.C. and played nine seasons in the Kent County Football League, then two seasons in the Kent Invicta Football League before returning once again in 2013 to the Kent County League. The club changed its name to Sittingbourne Community F.C. in 2014 and were members of the Kent County League for a further two seasons until 2016.

== History ==
The Woodstock Park Football Club was founded as a Saturday team in 2002 by Sunday league club Old Oak FC (who had been formed themselves in 1970).

The new club were accepted into the Kent County League Division Two East and after finishing runners-up in their first season they were promoted. The club spent two seasons as members of Division One East before being relegated back to division two. Four seasons later in the 2008–09 season they finished as runners-up once again of Division Two East and gained promotion back to Division One East. They won that division at the first attempt in 2009–10, and completed a league and cup double that season by defeating Bromley Green 1–0 to win the Les Leckie Cup (the Eastern Section Challenge Cup). Following the league win Woodstock Park were promoted for the second successive season, on this occasion into the Kent County League's highest section, the non-regionalised Premier Division for the 2010–11 season where they finished tenth in the division which comprised sixteen clubs.

In 2011 the Kent Invicta League was established; this was at level 10 of the English football league system and above that of the Kent County League; Woodstock Park were accepted into the league for its inaugural season. Following a mid-table performance in the first season, 2011–12, the club slipped to fourteenth from sixteen clubs over the 2012–13 season.

In the summer of 2013 Sittingbourne F.C. relocated to the Woodstock Park Stadium and as part of the arrangement the Woodstock Park club voluntarily left the Kent Invicta League; they rejoined the Kent County League for the 2013–14 campaign, at its third tier Division Two East level. Following that season the club was renamed in 2014 as Sittingbourne Community F.C. serving as a feeder team to Sittingbourne FC. After two seasons competing in Division Two East of the Kent County League the club ceased to be a member following the 2015–2016 season, in which they had finished tenth from eleven clubs in their division.

== Colours ==
Sittingbourne Community's colours were all navy blue shirts, shorts and socks with an all red strip as their away colours.

== Ground ==
Sittingbourne Community played their home games at Woodstock Park, Broad Oak Rd, Sittingbourne, ME9 8AG.

The Woodstock Park complex (comprising a social club and sports pitches) was home to Woodstock Park from their inception in 2002. Eight seasons later, in 2010, following development of the site they were joined by Norton Sports (who were renamed as Woodstock Sports F.C. in 2011), they were members of the Kent League. In 2013 Sittingbourne F.C., then of the Isthmian League, relocated to the main Woodstock Park pitch, sharing it with Woodstock Sports FC, with the Woodstock Park club using a second pitch at the complex.

== Honours ==
=== League honours ===
- Kent County League
  - Division One East: Champions (1): 2009–10
  - Division Two East: Runners-up (2): 2002–03, 2008–09

=== Cup honours ===
- Kent County League Eastern Section Challenge Cup (Les Leckie Cup)
  - Winners (1): 2009–10
- Weald of Kent Charity Senior Cup.
  - Winners (2): 2009–10, 2010–11
- Weald of Kent Charity Junior Cup
  - Winners (3): 2005–06, 2006–07, 2008–09

== Records ==
- Highest League Position: 9th in Kent Invicta League 2011–12
- Record appearances: Mark Rees with 200 appearances
