= Erith & Belvedere F.C. =

Association football club in England

Erith & Belvedere
- Full name: Erith & Belvedere Football Club
- Nickname: The Deres
- Founded: 1922
- Ground: Park View Road, Welling
- Capacity: 4,000 (1,070 seated)
- Co-chairs: Amy Springett & Paul Springett
- Manager: Gary Alexander
- League: Southern Counties East League Premier Division
- 2025–26: Southern Counties East League Premier Division, 11th of 19
Home colours	Away colours

Erith & Belvedere Football Club is a football club based in the London Borough of Bexley, England. They are currently members of the Southern Counties East League Premier Division and play at Park View Road, a ground shared with Welling United.

== History ==
The club was established in 1922 as part of a restructure of Belvedere & District, which had been formed in 1918. Belvedere & District had joined Division Two West of the Kent League in 1919, but left the league at the end of the 1920–21 season. The new club joined the Kent League for the 1922–23 season and were placed in Division One. In 1923–24 they reached the final of the FA Amateur Cup, losing 3–0 to Clapton at the Den. However, the season also saw them win the Kent Amateur Cup.

After finishing third in 1928–29, Erith & Belvedere joined the Premier Division of the London League, the club's reserves having played in Division One of the league since 1923. However, both teams left the league at the end of the 1929–30 season, with the first team returning to Division One of the Kent League. In 1937–38 they reached the FA Amateur Cup final again, losing 1–0 to Bromley at the Den. During World War II they played in the South-East Combination, winning the league and League Cup double and the Kent Senior Cup in 1941–42.

After the war Erith & Belvedere won the London Senior Cup in 1945 and were founder members of the Corinthian League for the 1945–46 season. They won the league's Memorial Shield three times in row between 1947–48 and 1949–50 and were league runners-up in 1962–63 but the league disbanded at the end of the season and together with most other teams in the league, they became members of the new Division One of the Athenian League. They were Division One runners-up in 1970–71, missing out on the title on goal average, and were promoted to the Premier Division. They went on to win the League Cup in 1973–74. After finishing second-from-bottom of the (now single division) Athenian League in 1977–78, the club returned to the Kent League.

Erith & Belvedere were Division One champions in 1981–82, earning promotion to the Southern Division of the Southern League. They remained in the division until being moved to the Eastern Division in 1999. After several seasons of struggling, the club dropped back into the Kent League in 2005. In 2012–13 they were league champions; going into the final match they needed to win and better VCD Athletic's result by a margin of five goals. A 7–1 win secured the title and promotion to Division One North of the Isthmian League. However, the following season saw them finish bottom of the division, resulting in relegation back to the Kent League, now renamed the Southern Counties East League. In 2016–17 they finished bottom of the league's Premier Division and were relegated to Division One. The 2018–19 season saw the club finish as runners-up in Division One, earning promotion back to the Premier Division. They were Premier Division champions in 2022–23 and were promoted to the South East Division of the Isthmian League. However, the club finished bottom of the South East Division the following season, and were relegated back to the Premier Division of the Southern Counties East League.

== Ground ==
The club originally played at Park View, where they remained until the main stand was burnt down in 1997. In 1999 they moved into Welling United's Park View Road.

== Honours ==
- Athenian League
  - League Cup winners 1973–74
- Corinthian League
  - Memorial Shield winners 1947–48, 1948–49, 1949–50,
- Southern Counties East League
  - Premier Division champions 2022–23
  - Champions 1981–82, 2012–13
  - Premier League Cup winners 2012–13
- South-East Combination
  - Champions 1941–42
  - League Cup winners 1941–42
- Kent Senior Cup
  - Winners 1941–42
- London Senior Cup
  - Winners 1944–45
- Kent Amateur Cup
  - Winners 1923–24, 1947–48, 1965–66, 1966–67, 1968–69, 1969–70

== Records ==
- Best FA Cup performance: Third qualifying round, 1926–27, 1961–62, 1962–63, 1974–75, 1989–90, 1991–92, 1993–94, 1997–98
- Best FA Amateur Cup performance: Finalists, 1923–24, 1937–38
- Best FA Trophy performance: Second round, 1999–2000, 2002–03
- Best FA Vase performance: Quarter-finals, 2014–15, 2024–25
- Record attendance: 5,573 vs Crook Colliery Welfare, FA Amateur Cup, 19 February 1949
- Biggest competitive victory: 14–1 vs Orpington, Kent Senior Cup, 14 March 1942
- Worst defeat: 15–0 vs Ashford, Kent League, 28 April 1937

== See also ==
- Erith & Belvedere F.C. players
- Erith & Belvedere F.C. managers
