= Park View Road =

Sports venue in Welling, England

Coordinates: 51°27′37″N 0°06′59″E

- Park View
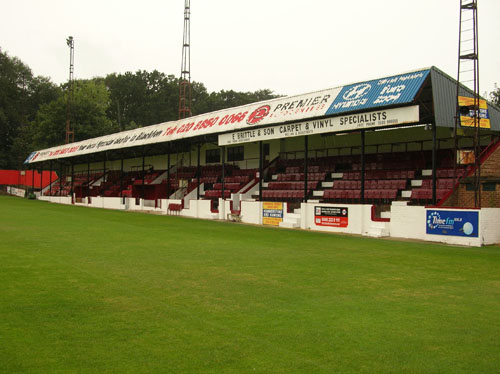
- The Main Stand
- Interactive map of Park View Road
- Full name: Park View Road Ground
- Location: Welling

Construction
- Built: Circa 1925
- Opened: Circa 1925

Tenants
- Bexley United F.C. (circa 1945–1976); Welling United F.C. (1977–present); Erith & Belvedere F.C. (1999–present)

Park View Road is home to Isthmian Premier League semi- professional football club Welling United, and was the ground of their predecessors Bexley United. Welling have played there since 1977. It is also the home of Erith & Belvedere who have been ground sharing since the 1999 season.

The ground takes its name from a section of the A207 road in Welling, immediately adjacent to Danson Park.

== History ==
Football has been played at Park View Road since the 1920s with a grandstand having been built by the late 1930s. It suffered damage from passing German bombers en route to bomb London in 1940 during World War II. It then lay derelict for some years after. This was until a campaign was initiated to reform Bexleyheath & Welling F.C. Crowds soon reached over 2,000.

In 1950, the current main stand was built. Crowds continued to rise in the 1960s and so the main stand was enlarged, and covered terracing was increased. By the 1970s however, the club (which was then known as Bexley United) had fallen on hard times and was forced to fold. Bexley United played its last game in April 1976 in front of 222 spectators.

In 1977, Welling United (that had been playing in nearby Eltham) secured a 15-year lease of the ground. It had been left to rot and a fire had damaged the main stand.

Erith & Belvedere F.C. moved into the ground in 1999 after the main stand at their old stadium – also known as Park View – burnt down. The club sold their old site in 2001 and financed the development of the far side of the ground, where their headquarters are now maintained. Seats replaced the dilapidated terrace.

== Footnotes ==
- "Pyramid Passion" Feature on stadium
