= 2026–27 FA Vase =

Tournament details
- Country: England; Wales; Guernsey
- Dates: Qualifying: 15 August 2026 – 12 September 2026; Competition Proper: 10 October 2026 – 16 May 2027
- Teams: 601

The 2026–27 FA Vase is the 2026–27 season of the FA Vase, an annual football competition for clubs playing at Steps 5 and 6 of the National League System in England, equivalent to tiers 9-10 of the overall English football league system.

AFC Stoneham won the 2026 FA Vase final, but were unable to defend their title because they were promoted to Step 4 and played in the 2026–27 FA Trophy instead.

== Calendar ==
The competition is scheduled to take place between August 2026 and May 2027, with the final scheduled for 16 May 2027 at Wembley Stadium.

Round	Main date	Number of fixtures	Clubs remaining	New entries this round	Winner Prize Money	Loser Prize Money
First round qualifying	15 August 2026	190	601 → 411	380	£550	£160
Second round qualifying	12 September 2026	180	411 → 231	170	£725	£225
First round proper	10 October 2026	103	231 → 128	26	£825	£250
Second round proper	31 October 2026	64	128 → 64	25	£900	£275
Third round proper	28 November 2026	32	64 → 32	None	£1,125	£350
Fourth round proper	9 January 2027	16	32 → 16	None	£1,875	£600
Fifth round proper	6 February 2027	8	16 → 8	None	£2,250	£725
Sixth round proper	6 March 2027	4	8 → 4	None	£4,125	£1,350
Semi-finals	3 and 10 April 2027	2	4 → 2	None	£5,500	£1,725
Final	16 May 2027	1	2 → 1	None	£30,000	£15,000

== First qualifying round ==
The draw for the first qualifying round was made on 3 July 2026, with fixtures being played on the weekend of Saturday 15 August. 380 clubs (195 from Tier 9, and 185 from Tier 10) were to play 190 matches, but only 189 were played; the match between Squires Gate and Boro Rangers was awarded to Squires Gate as a walkover after Boro Rangers withdrew from the Northern League in June 2026, and so were no longer eligible to play in the FA Vase.

Number of teams per tier still in competition
Tier 9	Tier 10	Total
317 / 317	284 / 284	601 / 601

Tie	Home team (Tier) (Note: (9) represents teams allocated to divisions at the 9th tier of English football (otherwise known as Step 5 of the National League System). (10) represents the 10th tier (Step 6 NLS).)	Score	Away team (Tier)	Att.
Friday 14 August 2026
10	Whickham (9)	3–1	Newcastle University (10)	186
11	Newton Aycliffe (9)	4–2	FC Hartlepool (10)	252
26	MSB Woolton (10)	1–0	AFC Liverpool (10)	252
28	Daisy Hill (10)	1–3	Cheadle Town (9)	164
41	Sheffield (9)	2–0	Crowle Colts (10)	346
70	Belper United (9)	4–1	Ingles (10)	142
82	Romford (9)	2–1	Ilford (9)	118
90	Cannons Wood (10)	3–3 (2–4 p)	Colney Heath (9)	20
102	Enfield (9)	0–2	Belstone (10)	114
107	Broadfields United (9)	2–3	Ampthill Town (10)	95
122	Sandhurst Town (10)	4–1	Wokingham Town (9)	312
160	Wick (9)	4–1	Loxwood (10)	151
170	Clanfield (10)	2–3	Romsey Town (10)	49
Saturday 15 August 2026
1	Squires Gate (10)	w/o	Boro Rangers (10)	NA
2	Knaresborough Town (9)	3–0	Chester-Le-Street Park View (10)	106
3	Route One Rovers (10)	3–3 (6–5 p)	AFC Blackpool (10)	60
4	Kendal Town (9)	2–1	Steeton (10)	220
5	Billingham Town (10)	1–0	Crook Town (9)	185
6	Thackley (9)	0–1	Yarm & Eaglescliffe (9)	128
7	Billingham Synthonia (10)	0–2	Carlisle City (9)	105
8	Boldon CA (10)	2–1	Longridge Town (9)	155
9	Leeds UFCA (10)	2–2 (6–5 p)	Ilkley Town (10)	44
12	Harrogate Railway Athletic (10)	0–1	Grangetown Boys Club (10)	145
13	Ryton & Crawcrook Albion (10)	5–1	Sunderland RCA (10)	95
15	Northallerton Town (9)	0–2	Durham United (10)	118
16	Field Olympic (10)	3–1	Keighley Town (9)	137
17	Pickering Town (9)	3–1	Alnwick Town (10)	248
18	Barnoldswick Town (9)	1–2	Colne (10)	336
19	Thornaby (9)	1–3	Blyth Town (9)	159
20	Chester Le Street Town (10)	1–2	Redcar Town (9)	136
21	Marske United (9)	2–1	Seaham Red Star (10)	166
22	Hemsworth Miners Welfare (10)	0–2	Dearne & District (9)	122
23	Winterton Rangers (10)	1–2	Darwen (10)	89
24	Glossop North End (9)	0–2	Staveley MW (10)	190
25	Selby Town (10)	1–0	Bacup Borough (10)	261
27	New Mills (10)	0–2	Northwich Victoria (9)	178
29	Cheadle Heath Nomads (10)	0–3	Wythenshawe Town (9)	85
30	Retford (9)	2–2 (6–5 p)	Euxton Villa (9)	142
31	Flixton (10)	2–4	Worsbrough Bridge Athletic (9)	344
32	Barton Town (9)	2–3	Runcorn Town (9)	101
33	Stockport Georgians (9)	2–1	Penistone Church (9)	188
34	Irlam (9)	1–3	Barnton (10)	105
35	Atherton Laburnum Rovers (9)	2–2 (3–1 p)	Cammell Laird 1907 (10)	154
36	Maine Road (10)	1–4	Litherland Remyca (9)	47
37	Armthorpe Welfare (10)	0–4	Trafford (9)	169
38	Ashton Athletic (10)	0–2	FC St Helens (9)	134
39	Appleby Frodingham (10)	1–1 (3–4 p)	Charnock Richard (9)	62
40	Wombwell Town (10)	1–4	Golcar United (9)	143
42	Horbury Town (9)	1–2	Club Thorne Colliery (10)	75
43	Stapenhill (10)	0–1	Ludlow Town (10)	89
44	Stafford Town (10)	0–3	Abbey Hulton United (9)	209
45	Sandbach United (10)	0–1	Ashby Ivanhoe (9)	154
46	Atherstone Town (9)	4–0	Boldmere Rangers (10)	315
47	Eccleshall (10)	4–0	Allscott Heath (10)	55
48	Pershore Town 88 (9)	0–0 (5–3 p)	Romulus (9)	110
49	Dudley Town (9)	3–0	Alsager Town (10)	71
50	Foley Meir (10)	0–0 (4–2 p)	Redditch Borough (10)	36
51	Studley (10)	3–1	Market Drayton Town (10)	100
52	Telford Town (10)	1–1 (6–5 p)	Darlaston Town 1874 (9)	70
53	Wednesfield Community (10)	1–4	Sutton United (Birmingham) (9)	94
54	Stourport Swifts (9)	1–2	Knowle (9)	81
55	Westfields (9)	7–1	Bromyard Town (10)	136
56	Coventry Copsewood (10)	0–0 (3–1 p)	Droitwich Spa (9)	169
57	Coventry Sphinx (9)	5–3	Cradley Town (10)	91
58	Lye Town (9)	2–1	Sporting Khalsa (9)	74
Match played at Bilston Town
59	Pinxton (10)	2–2 (4–2 p)	Blackstones (9)	45
60	Coalville Town (10)	2–1	Deeping Rangers (9)	180
61	Clay Cross Town (9)	0–2	Anstey Town (10)	110
62	AFC Mansfield (9)	3–2	Kimberley Miners Welfare (9)	48
63	Hucknall Town (9)	3–1	Aylestone Park (9)	266
64	Sandiacre Town (10)	0–1	Harrowby United (10)	56
65	Selston (10)	0–1	Heanor Town (9)	121
66	Holwell Sports (10)	0–4	Shirebrook Town (10)	57
67	West Bridgford Colts (10)	4–1	Gedling MW (10)	59
68	Leicester St Andrews (10)	1–1 (4–5 p)	Southwell City (10)	85
69	Pinchbeck United (10)	0–3	Stapleford Town (10)	39
71	Skegness Town (9)	1–1 (3–4 p)	Eastwood (9)	67
72	Ely City (9)	5–0	Godmanchester Rovers (9)	128
73	Diss Town (10)	0–2	Stowmarket Town (9)	172
74	Woodbridge Town (9)	2–2 (12–11 p)	Lakenheath (9)	139
75	Harleston Town (9)	5–0	Whittlesey Athletic (10)	105
76	Ipswich Wanderers (9)	2–0	March Town United (9)	203
77	Wisbech Town (9)	7–0	Framlingham Town (10)	196
78	Mildenhall Town (9)	1–3	Walsham Le Willows (9)	140
79	Eaton Socon (10)	0–1	Yaxley (9)	95
80	Soham Town Rangers (9)	4–0	Histon (9)	263
81	FC Peterborough (9)	4–1	Heacham (9)	94
83	Basildon United (9)	0–3	Baldock Town (9)	81
84	Langford (10)	1–3	Haverhill Rovers (9)	69
85	Harlow Town (9)	6–0	Harwich & Parkeston (9)	284
86	Enfield Borough (10)	1–2	Heybridge Swifts (9)	79
87	Sporting Bengal United (9)	3–1	NW London (10)	28
88	Burnham Ramblers (10)	2–0	AFC Welwyn (9)	63
89	Clapton Community (9)	1–1 (5–3 p)	Long Melford (10)	511
91	Marcelona (10)	1–4	Barking (9)	68
92	Arlesey Town (9)	0–6	Biggleswade United (9)	123
93	FC Baresi (10)	1–4	Cornard United (9)	11

Tie	Home team (Tier)	Score	Away team (Tier)	Att.
94	West Essex (9)	4–1	Hutton (9)	59
95	Hadleigh United (10)	2–2 (3–4 p)	Sawbridgeworth Town (9)	105
96	Wivenhoe Town (10)	2–0	Frenford (9)	102
97	Stansted (10)	1–3	Potton United (9)	93
Match played at Potton United
98	East Thurrock Community (10)	0–3	Letchworth Garden City Eagles (10)	106
99	Hackney Wick (9)	0–1	Basildon Town (10)	42
100	May & Baker Eastbrook Community (10)	2–1	London Harts United (10)	19
101	Dunmow Town (10)	0–0 (3–4 p)	Brantham Athletic (9)	37
103	Easington Sports (9)	4–1	PFC Victoria London (10)	82
104	Spartans Youth (10)	1–1 (3–1 p)	Kempston Rovers (9)	62
105	Holyport (9)	3–0	Amersham Town (9)	72
Match played at Ascot United
106	Risborough Rangers (9)	1–0	Holmer Green (10)	103
108	Abingdon United (9)	4–1	Rushden & Higham United (10)	148
110	Rothwell Corinthians (10)	2–5	Northwood (9)	50
111	Wallingford & Crowmarsh (9)	1–0	North Greenford United (9)	116
112	Harefield United (9)	6–1	Staines & Lammas (Middlesex) (10)	62
113	Newport Pagnell Town (9)	5–0	Spelthorne Sports (10)	167
114	Buckingham (10)	1–3	Bedfont (9)	95
115	Rayners Lane (9)	1–2	New Bradwell St Peter (10)	66
116	Crawley Green (10)	1–6	Kidlington (9)	49
117	Cranfield United (10)	5–1	Edgware & Kingsbury (10)	36
118	Wellingborough Whitworth (10)	5–2	Langley (10)	98
119	Everett Rovers (9)	2–1	Brook House (10)	48
120	Tring Athletic (9)	3–1	Aylesbury Vale Dynamos (9)	235
121	Radstock Town (10)	1–1 (3–0 p)	Keynsham Town (10)	167
123	Newent Town (10)	3–3 (4–3 p)	Almondsbury (10)	120
124	Clevedon Town (9)	2–0	Cribbs (9)	226
125	Eversley & California (9)	2–1	AEK Boco (10)	56
126	Carterton (10)	3–1	Wells City (9)	67
127	Tadley Calleva (9)	0–4	Roman Glass St George (9)	101
128	Malmesbury Victoria (9)	3–1	Lydney Town (10)	67
129	Highworth Town (9)	1–0	Bradford Town (9)	97
Match played at Cirencester Town
130	Woodley United (10)	1–3	Cirencester Town (9)	52
131	Avonmouth (10)	1–1 (4–3 p)	Fairford Town (9)	95
132	Bristol Telephones (10)	1–2	AFC Aldermaston (10)	38
133	Oldland Abbotonians (10)	1–2	Shepton Mallet (9)	79
134	Brislington (9)	1–0	Royal Wootton Bassett Town (9)	98
135	Kintbury Rangers (10)	0–1	Mangotsfield United (9)	110
136	Devizes Town (9)	5–1	Bitton (10)	109
137	Welton Rovers (10)	1–0	Chipping Sodbury Town (10)	55
138	Clanfield 85 (10)	1–2	Cadbury Heath (10)	85
139	Stonehouse Town (10)	4–0	Thornbury Town (9)	131
140	Portishead Town (9)	7–1	Mendip Broadwalk (10)	252
141	Minster (10)	4–0	Dial Square (10)	188
143	Seaford Town (9)	2–1	Halls Athletic (10)	68
144	Westfield (Sussex) (10)	2–2 (3–5 p)	AFC Walcountians (10)	17
145	FC Elmstead (10)	0–4	Lewisham Borough (Community) (10)	101
146	Abbey Rangers (9)	4–0	Sheppey Sports (10)	71
147	Mile Oak (10)	1–4	Banstead Athletic (10)	48
148	SE Dons (9)	4–0	Little Common (9)	225
Match played at Chatham Town
149	Newhaven (9)	0–1	Guernsey (9)	109
150	Beckenham Town (9)	2–1	Sutton Athletic (9)	121
151	Hassocks (9)	1–0	Petts Wood & Holmesdale (9)	164
152	Saltdean United (10)	2–2 (3–0 p)	Colliers Wood United (10)	81
153	Horsham YM (9)	1–5	Epsom & Ewell (9)	95
154	Worthing United (10)	4–0	Ringmer (10)	53
155	Kennington (9)	1–0	Guildford City (10)	133
157	Balham (9)	6–1	Oakwood (10)	53
158	Lordswood (10)	0–1	Corinthian (9)	116
159	Jarvis Brook (10)	5–0	East Preston (10)	101
161	Bearsted (9)	4–1	Redhill (9)	91
162	Corinthian Casuals (9)	0–1	Knaphill (9)	254
163	AFC Greenwich Borough (9)	3–1	Sheerwater (9)	66
Match played at Petts Wood & Holmesdale
164	Shoreham (10)	1–1 (2–4 p)	Lancing (9)	257
165	Fleetlands (9)	3–0	Wincanton Town (10)	40
166	Alton (9)	1–2	Badshot Lea (9)	210
167	Andover New Street (9)	1–0	Bemerton Heath Harlequins (9)	230
168	Bashley (9)	1–3	Blandford United (10)	221
169	Cove (10)	2–1	Laverstock & Ford (9)	90
171	Midhurst & Easebourne (9)	3–3 (5–3 p)	Warminster Town (10)	82
172	Pagham (9)	1–0	Millbrook (Hampshire) (10)	117
173	Fareham Town (9)	0–0 (3–5 p)	Baffins Milton Rovers (9)	226
174	Newport (IW) (10)	2–1	Colden Common (10)	153
175	Selsey (10)	1–1 (3–4 p)	Hamworthy United (10)	130
176	Horndean (9)	1–1 (2–4 p)	Totton & Eling (10)	64
177	Bridport (10)	2–0	Folland Sports (10)	127
178	Hamble Club (9)	2–4	Cowes Sports (9)	103
179	Wadebridge Town (10)	2–3	Wendron United (10)	73
180	Liskeard Athletic (9)	1–2	Brixham (9)	122
181	St Blazey (9)	3–0	Launceston (10)	147
182	Penzance (10)	0–3	Bridgwater United (9)	243
183	Cullompton Rangers (10)	7–0	Helston Athletic (10)	83
184	Ivybridge Town (9)	2–1	Teignmouth (10)	58
185	Ilminster Town (10)	1–0	Wellington (9)	149
186	Callington Town (10)	0–2	Tavistock (9)	214
187	Stoke Gabriel & Torbay Police (10)	0–1	Sticker (10)	90
188	Mousehole (10)	1–5	Torridgeside (10)	75
189	Bude Town (10)	0–2	Newton Abbot Spurs (10)	121
190	Torpoint Athletic (9)	5–1	Bishops Lydeard (10)	107
Sunday 16 August 2026
14	Campion (9)	3–0	Prudhoe Youth Club (10)	122
109	Eagles Land Benfica (10)	0–1	Virginia Water (9)	70
142	Roffey (9)	2–2 (4–2 p)	Hollands & Blair (9)	163
156	Bexhill United (9)	1–1 (9–8 p)	Erith & Belvedere (9)	105
Match played at Erith & Belvedere

== Second qualifying round ==
The draw for the second qualifying round was made on 3 July 2026, with fixtures being played on the weekend of Saturday 12 September. 190 clubs progressed from the first qualifying round, to which were added a further 170 (80 from Tier 9, and 90 from Tier 10) bringing the total to 360 clubs.

Number of teams per tier still in competition
Tier 9	Tier 10	Total
243 / 317	168 / 284	411 / 601

Tie	Home team (Tier) (Note: (9) represents teams allocated to divisions at the 9th tier of English football (otherwise known as Step 5 of the National League System). (10) represents the 10th tier (Step 6 NLS).)	Score	Away team (Tier)	Att.
Friday 11 September 2026
5	Easington Colliery (9)	2–2 (2–4 p)	Durham United (10)	161
116	Clevedon Town (9)	4–1	Odd Down (Bath) (10)	175
29	Barnton (10)	2–2 (6–7 p)	Parkgate (10)	224
30	Worsbrough Bridge Athletic (9)	1–0	Wakefield (10)	268
43	Hinckley (9)	6–1	Highgate United (9)	171
48	Lye Town (9)	1–1 (4–1 p)	Birmingham OJM (10)	163
74	Walsham Le Willows (9)	2–0	Dussindale & Hellesdon Rovers (10)	133
85	May & Baker Eastbrook Community (10)	3–2	Harlow Town (9)	95
89	West Essex (9)	6–0	Brimsdown (10)	116
91	AFC Pegasus (10)	2–2 (5–6 p)	Rayleigh Town (10)	72
103	Spartans Youth (10)	2–2 (8–7 p)	Abingdon United (9)	57
136	Greenways (10)	1–3	SE Dons (9)	249
139	Sutton Common Rovers (9)	4–0	Reigate Priory (10)	73
143	Kennington (9)	4–0	Minster (10)	121
145	Sporting Club Thamesmead (10)	0–3	Tooting & Mitcham United (9)	75
164	Hedge End Rangers (10)	5–1	Totton & Eling (10)	241
10	Pickering Town (9)	3–2	Grangetown Boys Club (10)	252
77	Hertford Heath (10)	3–0	Sporting Bengal United (9)	133
Saturday 12 September 2026
62	Anstey Town (10)	4–3	Coalville Town (10)	171
140	Guernsey (9)	1–2	Roffey (9)	352
1	Redcar Town (10)	2–3	Penrith (9)	111
2	Field Olympic (10)	4–2	Leeds UFCA (10)	81
3	Holker Old Boys (10)	7–2	Seaton Carew (10)	68
4	Newcastle Blue Star (9)	0–3	Newton Aycliffe (9)	358
6	Yarm & Eaglescliffe (9)	2–0	Kendal Town (9)	112
7	Tow Law Town (10)	0–2	Colne (10)	155
8	Whitley Bay (9)	1–2	Darlington Town (10)	405
9	Blyth Town (9)	4–2	Squires Gate (10)	113
11	Knaresborough Town (9)	1–3	Bishop Auckland (9)	217
12	Garstang (10)	0–5	Shildon (9)	98
13	Jarrow (10)	3–1	Marske United (9)	151
15	Carlisle City (9)	4–0	Tadcaster Albion (9)	105
17	Newcastle Benfield (9)	0–1	Thornton Cleveleys (10)	91
18	Ryton & Crawcrook Albion (10)	1–1 (6–7 p)	Billingham Town (10)	170
19	Route One Rovers (10)	1–1 (3–4 p)	Horden Community Welfare (9)	58
20	Runcorn Town (9)	1–1 (3–4 p)	Cheadle Town (9)	125
21	Atherton Laburnum Rovers (9)	4–0	Abbey Hey (9)	139
22	FC St Helens (9)	9–0	Frickley Athletic (9)	191
23	Golcar United (9)	0–4	Bottesford Town (9)	267
24	Selby Town (10)	4–2	Swallownest (10)	262
25	Brigg Town CIC (10)	3–2	Dearne & District (9)	295
26	Maghull (10)	3–1	Club Thorne Colliery (10)	155
27	Stockport Georgians (9)	1–4	Staveley MW (10)	104
28	Darwen (10)	2–3	Northwich Victoria (9)	198
31	Trafford (9)	1–1 (3–4 p)	Charnock Richard (9)	362
32	Uppermill (10)	2–3	Retford (9)	170
33	MSB Woolton (10)	1–0	Litherland Remyca (9)	84
34	Wythenshawe Town (9)	1–4	Sheffield (9)	104
35	Ashville (10)	2–2 (5–4 p)	Athersley Recreation (9)	94
36	Dronfield Town (10)	0–2	Handsworth (9)	127
37	Sutton United (Birmingham) (9)	3–0	Dudley Town (9)	142
38	Coventry Copsewood (10)	2–3	AFC Bridgnorth (10)	60
39	AFC Wolverhampton City (9)	2–2 (3–4 p)	Whitchurch Alport (9)	106
40	Coton Green (9)	2–0	Crewe (10)	44
41	Atherstone Town (9)	4–1	Uttoxeter Town (9)	205
42	Hereford Pegasus (9)	0–2	Ludlow Town (10)	74
44	Knowle (9)	2–2 (3–4 p)	Ashby Ivanhoe (9)	51
45	Abbey Hulton United (9)	2–0	Pershore Town 88 (9)	91
46	Westfields (9)	2–1	Stone Old Alleynians (9)	82
47	Telford Town (10)	0–2	Bewdley Town (10)	80
49	Wolverhampton Casuals (10)	3–1	Studley (10)	92
50	Eccleshall (10)	2–1	Coventry Sphinx (9)	77
51	Foley Meir (10)	1–0	FC Stratford (9)	49
52	Rugby Town (9)	3–2	Shawbury United (10)	225
53	Tividale (9)	1–5	Brocton (9)	67
54	Hucknall Town (9)	3–0	Saffron Dynamo (10)	191
55	AFC Mansfield (9)	2–0	Shirebrook Town (10)	85
56	Pinxton (10)	3–0	West Bridgford Colts (10)	74
57	Heanor Town (9)	3–3 (5–3 p)	Clifton All Whites (10)	147
58	Stapleford Town (10)	0–2	Harrowby United (10)	88
59	Louth Town (10)	1–1 (6–7 p)	Kirby Muxloe (10)	46
60	Leicester Nirvana (9)	2–3	Belper United (9)	75
61	AFC North Kilworth (10)	2–1	Holbeach United (10)	218
63	Southwell City (10)	2–1	South Normanton Athletic (10)	83
64	Clipstone (10)	0–5	Eastwood (9)	128
65	Newark Town (9)	1–4	Lutterworth Town (9)	102
66	Birstall United (10)	1–1 (3–0 p)	Sleaford Town (10)	102
67	Wisbech Town (9)	5–0	Huntingdon Town (10)	192
68	Yaxley (9)	1–3	Kirkley & Pakefield (9)	82
69	Stowmarket Town (9)	2–0	FC Parson Drove (10)	246
70	Norwich United (10)	2–0	Soham Town Rangers (9)	73
71	St Neots Town (9)	1–0	Thetford Town (9)	204
72	Downham Town (9)	1–0	Woodbridge Town (9)	126
73	Ely City (9)	2–1	Harleston Town (9)	163
75	Netherton United (10)	1–2	Eynesbury Rovers (9)	95
76	Ipswich Wanderers (9)	3–5	FC Peterborough (9)	152
78	Barking (9)	0–2	Hullbridge Sports (9)	68
79	Baldock Town (9)	4–0	Cornard United (9)	47
80	Haverhill Rovers (9)	2–1	East Thurrock Community (10)	96
81	Potton United (9)	0–2	Wormley Rovers (9)	139

Tie	Home team (Tier)	Score	Away team (Tier)	Att.
82	Woodford Town (9)	0–2	Hoddesdon Town (10)	73
83	Heybridge Swifts (9)	2–1	Clapton Community (9)	157
84	Southend Manor (10)	1–1 (11–12 p)	Holland (10)	75
86	Belstone (10)	3–1	Wivenhoe Town (10)	103
87	Great Wakering Rovers (9)	1–4	Biggleswade United (9)	116
88	Athletic Newham (10)	1–3	Clacton Town (10)	35
90	Burnham Ramblers (10)	2–3	Romford (9)	124
93	Basildon Town (10)	0–3	Colney Heath (9)	62
94	Brantham Athletic (9)	0–4	Hadleigh United (10)	135
95	Newport Pagnell Town (9)	2–0	Virginia Water (9)	190
96	Kidlington (9)	5–2	Wembley (10)	63
97	Everett Rovers (9)	2–2 (4–2 p)	Daventry Town (9)	55
98	Dunstable (9)	5–1	Hilltop (9)	136
99	Risborough Rangers (9)	6–1	Northampton Sileby Rangers (9)	51
100	FC Deportivo Galicia (10)	1–3	Easington Sports (9)	49
102	Bedfont (9)	2–1	Holyport (9)	38
104	New Bradwell St Peter (10)	0–1	Moulton (9)	98
105	Harefield United (9)	4–0	North Leigh (9)	80
106	Wellingborough Whitworth (10)	0–4	Tring Athletic (9)	189
107	Ardley United (9)	1–1 (6–5 p)	Wallingford & Crowmarsh (9)	128
108	Ampthill Town (10)	0–0 (4–3 p)	Cranfield United (10)	181
109	Northwood (9)	3–1	Maidenhead Town (10)	121
110	Kings Langley (9)	4–0	Bugbrooke St Michaels (9)	101
111	Oxhey Jets (10)	1–1 (2–4 p)	Irchester United (10)	54
112	Avonmouth (10)	2–2 (5–4 p)	Roman Glass St George (9)	108
113	Brislington (9)	3–1	Sharpness (10)	130
114	Welton Rovers (9)	1–5	Tuffley Rovers (9)	52
115	Stonehouse Town (10)	0–1	Cheltenham Saracens (10)	121
117	Longlevens (9)	1–0	Radstock Town (10)	72
118	Longwell Green Sports (10)	4–0	Thatcham Town (9)	95
119	AFC Aldermaston (10)	5–0	Newent Town (10)	36
120	Sandhurst Town (10)	3–5	Carterton (10)	95
121	Shepton Mallet (9)	1–1 (3–1 p)	Nailsea United (10)	168
122	Cirencester Town (9)	2–1	Corsham Town (9)	204
123	Devizes Town (9)	4–0	Cadbury Heath (10)	132
124	Calne Town (10)	0–0 (3–5 p)	Highworth Town (9)	107
125	Eversley & California (9)	0–3	Mangotsfield United (9)	49
126	Malmesbury Victoria (9)	1–5	Portishead Town (9)	73
127	Wantage Town (10)	5–0	Shortwood United (10)	156
128	Brimscombe & Thrupp (10)	2–2 (5–3 p)	Yateley United (9)	64
129	Metropolitan Police (9)	2–2 (3–4 p)	Stansfeld (10)	43
130	Chislehurst Glebe (9)	4–0	Godalming Town (9)	121
131	Westside (10)	3–1	Lewisham Borough (Community) (10)	15
132	Corinthian (9)	2–1	Staplehurst Monarchs United (10)	73
133	Forest Row (9)	0–0 (8–7 p)	Saltdean United (10)	60
134	Rochester United (10)	3–2	Banstead Athletic (10)	107
135	Knaphill (9)	0–1	Lingfield (9)	119
137	Hassocks (9)	2–2 (4–2 p)	Abbey Rangers (9)	251
138	Lancing (9)	1–0	Croydon (10)	164
142	Worthing United (10)	4–1	Arundel (10)	127
144	Seaford Town (9)	2–5	Chipstead (9)	124
146	Rusthall (9)	4–1	AFC Walcountians (10)	150
148	Phoenix Sports (9)	4–3	Billingshurst (9)	82
149	AFC Greenwich Borough (9)	6–0	Molesey (10)	80
150	Beckenham Town (9)	1–2	AFC Varndeanians (9)	121
151	Lydd Town (10)	0–9	East Grinstead Town (9)	102
152	Tooting Bec (10)	2–1	Bexhill United (9)	41
153	Larkfield & New Hythe (9)	4–2	Balham (9)	70
154	Epsom & Ewell (9)	2–7	Bearsted (9)	89
155	Frimley Green (10)	0–3	Brockenhurst (9)	61
156	Ringwood Town (10)	1–1 (3–4 p)	Hamworthy United (10)	103
157	Bridport (10)	3–1	Badshot Lea (9)	170
158	Fawley (10)	1–2	Ash United (10)	65
159	Pagham (9)	3–0	Newport (IOW) (10)	153
160	Cowes Sports (9)	1–0	Christchurch (9)	113
161	Romsey Town (10)	2–1	Bournemouth Poppies (9)	131
162	Camberley Town (9)	0–1	Cove (10)	148
163	East Cowes Victoria Athletic (9)	1–2	Fleetlands (9)	88
165	Petersfield Town (9)	0–2	Andover New Street (9)	137
166	Whitchurch United (10)	2–5	Midhurst & Easebourne (9)	41
167	Sherborne Town (9)	3–0	Blandford United (10)	148
168	Baffins Milton Rovers (9)	1–1 (3–4 p)	New Milton Town (10)	80
169	Brixham (9)	4–0	Wendron United (10)	106
170	Middlezoy Rovers (10)	2–1	Ilfracombe Town (10)	29
171	Ivybridge Town (9)	1–4	Tavistock (9)	91
172	Torrington (10)	1–4	Camelford (10)	66
173	Newton Abbot Spurs (10)	2–1	Sticker (10)	45
174	Elburton Villa (10)	3–1	Sidmouth Town (9)	45
175	Torpoint Athletic (9)	0–2	Honiton Town (10)	108
176	Bridgwater United (9)	3–1	Saltash United (9)	170
177	Torridgeside (10)	6–1	Crediton United (10)	103
178	Newquay (9)	6–1	Cullompton Rangers (10)	272
179	St Blazey (9)	3–0	Millbrook (Cornwall) (10)	90
180	Street (9)	6–1	Ilminster Town (10)	121
14	Whickham (9)	2–2 (4–2 p)	Birtley Town (9)	161
Sunday 13 September 2026
16	Campion (9)	0–3	Boldon Community Association (10)	115
101	London Samurai Rovers (10)	2–2 (4–5 p)	Penn & Tylers Green (9)	62
92	White Ensign (9)	4–3	Halstead Town (9)	98
147	Hythe Town (10)	5–2	Wick (9)	191
Sunday 15 September 2026
141	Welling Town (10)	0–2	Jarvis Brook (10)	69

== First round proper ==
The draw for the first round proper was made on 14 September 2026, with fixtures being played on the weekend of Saturday 10 October. 180 clubs progressed from the second qualifying round, to which were added a further 26 (22 from Tier 9, and four from Tier 10) bringing the total to 206 clubs. The 26 clubs entering at this stage were clubs which had progressed as far as the Third Round Proper in 2025–26, but which were eliminated at that stage, and which were not taking part in the 2026–27 FA Trophy.

Number of teams per tier still in competition
Tier 9	Tier 10	Total
155 / 317	76 / 284	231 / 601

Tie	Home team (Tier) (Note: (9) represents teams allocated to divisions at the 9th tier of English football (otherwise known as Step 5 of the National League System). (10) represents the 10th tier (Step 6 NLS).)	Score	Away team (Tier)	Att.
Friday 9 October 2026
46	West Essex (9)	2–1	Rayleigh Town (10)	108
66	Roffey (9)	1–1 (2–4 p)	Kings Langley (9)	149
81	Sutton Common Rovers (9)	1–3	SE Dons (9)	459
Saturday 10 October 2026
1	Boldon CA (10)	1–0	Jarrow (10)	312
2	Horden Community Welfare (9)	1–2	Billingham Town (10)	157
3	Atherton Laburnum Rovers (9)	2–2 (5–4 p)	Field Olympic (10)	150
4	Thornton Cleveleys (10)	0–0 (5–4 p)	Albion Sports (9)	220
5	Charnock Richard (9)	1–2	Prestwich Heys (9)	187
6	Sheffield (9)	2–1	Ramsbottom United (9)	324
7	Cheadle Town (9)	4–1	Whickham (9)	133
8	Penrith (9)	2–4	Carlisle City (9)	362
9	Rossington Main (9)	1–2	Durham United (10)	68
10	Bishop Auckland (9)	3–1	Newton Aycliffe (9)	598
11	Maghull (10)	5–1	Colne (10)	238
12	Blyth Town (9)	0–0 (2–3 p)	Bottesford Town (9)	132
13	Parkgate (9)	0–3 (Note: Burscough later admitted to having fielded an ineligible player, and Parkgate were subsequently awarded the tie.)	Burscough (9)	85
14	Holker Old Boys (10)	5–1	Pickering Town (9)	115
15	Brigg Town CIC (10)	3–2	Selby Town (10)	354
16	Worsbrough Bridge Athletic (9)	1–4	Retford (9)	160
18	Shildon (9)	5–1	Handsworth (9)	170
19	FC St Helens (9)	6–0	Darlington Town (10)	177
20	Fulwood Amateurs (10)	2–5	Yarm & Eaglescliffe (9)	67
21	MSB Woolton (10)	4–1	Ashville (10)	116
22	Pinxton (10)	0–5	Brocton (9)	55
23	Kirby Muxloe (10)	0–1	Harrowby United (10)	79
24	AFC North Kilworth (10)	2–5	Ludlow Town (10)	138
25	Heanor Town (9)	2–0	Coton Green (9)	138
26	Easington Sports (9)	1–2	Northampton ON Chenecks (9)	110
27	Cheltenham Saracens (10)	2–3	Cinderford Town (9)	165
28	Belper United (9)	2–1	Hucknall Town (9)	148
29	Atherstone Town (9)	1–1 (4–2 p)	AFC Mansfield (9)	179
30	Whitchurch Alport (9)	0–2	Abbey Hulton United (9)	183
31	Foley Meir (10)	0–4	Ashby Ivanhoe (9)	70
32	Birstall United (10)	5–2	Bewdley Town (10)	86
33	Wolverhampton Casuals (10)	0–2	Southwell City (10)	84
34	Irchester United (10)	0–2	Sutton United (Birmingham) (9)	78
35	Hinckley (9)	3–2	Eccleshall (10)	144
36	Lutterworth Town (9)	0–2	Eastwood (9)	101
37	Staveley MW (10)	5–1	Ardley United (9)	251
38	Moulton (9)	0–2	AFC Bridgnorth (10)	72
39	Rugby Town (9)	6–0	Tuffley Rovers (9)	264
40	Anstey Town (10)	1–2	Lye Town (9)	96
41	Desborough Town (9)	0–0 (4–2 p)	Westfields (9)	140
42	Kidlington (9)	0–2	Longlevens (9)	54
43	Stowmarket Town (9)	1–1 (2–4 p)	Colney Heath (9)	171
44	Wisbech Town (9)	4–0	Walsham Le Willows (9)	223
45	Kirkley & Pakefield (9)	1–4	Halesworth Town (10)	160
47	Hertford Heath (10)	4–1	Newport Pagnell Town (9)	283
48	Ampthill Town (10)	2–2 (5–4 p)	Dunstable (9)	245
49	Holland (10)	0–0 (4–3 p)	Clacton Town (10)	250
50	Wormley Rovers (9)	1–1 (5–4 p)	Eynesbury Rovers (9)	130
51	Dereham Town (9)	2–2 (2–3 p)	Saffron Walden Town (9)	134
52	Belstone (10)	4–2	Baldock Town (9)	102

Tie	Home team	Score	Away team	Att.
53	Romford (9)	0–3	Hadleigh United (10)	111
54	Downham Town (9)	2–3	White Ensign (9)	111
55	Heybridge Swifts (9)	4–0	Hoddesdon Town (10)	227
56	FC Peterborough (9)	2–7	Biggleswade United (9)	121
57	Haverhill Rovers (9)	5–4	Ely City (9)	122
58	Norwich United (10)	1–1 (4–3 p)	Hullbridge Sports (9)	73
59	May & Baker Eastbrook Community (10)	2–2 (3–5 p)	St Neots Town (9)	78
60	Cove (10)	2–1	Tooting & Mitcham United (9)	148
61	Northwood (9)	3–0	Midhurst & Easebourne (9)	93
62	Penn & Tylers Green (9)	2–4	Phoenix Sports (9)	93
63	Eastbourne United (9)	2–0	Rochester United (10)	178
64	Jarvis Brook (10)	2–3	Faversham Strike Force (9)	184
65	Larkfield & New Hythe (9)	4–0	Chislehurst Glebe (9)	91
67	Hythe Town (10)	5–2	Worthing United (10)	241
68	AFC Greenwich Borough (9)	A–A	Tooting Bec (10)	58
Match abandoned in the 78th minute due to a player injury, with the score tied at 1–1.
69	Tring Athletic (9)	3–1	Kennington (9)	213
70	Risborough Rangers (9)	6–2	Soul Tower Hamlets (9)	87
71	East Grinstead Town (9)	4–1	Bedfont (9)	193
72	Forest Row (9)	1–1 (7–8 p)	Ash United (10)	55
73	Everett Rovers (9)	3–1	Westside (10)	48
74	Fleet Town (9)	3–3 (7–8 p)	Rusthall (9)	341
75	Snodland Town (9)	1–0	Spartans Youth (10)	204
76	Lingfield (9)	2–1	Chipstead (9)	83
77	Bearsted (9)	1–2	Hassocks (9)	104
78	Burnham (9)	1–2	Harefield United (9)	76
79	Tunbridge Wells (9)	0–0 (3–1 p)	Stansfeld (10)	174
82	Lancing (9)	1–1 (3–1 p)	Corinthian (9)	141
83	Berks County (10)	2–2 (8–9 p)	AFC Varndeanians (9)	134
84	Romsey Town (10)	2–2 (5–6 p)	Bridgwater United (9)	404
85	Amesbury Town (10)	1–0	Avonmouth (10)	106
86	Newquay (9)	1–4	Sturminster Newton United (9)	277
87	Shepton Mallet (9)	2–1	Brislington (9)	224
88	Tavistock (9)	0–2	Elburton Villa (10)	166
89	Brixham (9)	2–0	Carterton (10)	114
90	Portishead Town (9)	4–0	Street (9)	343
91	Bridport (10)	3–4	Cirencester Town (9)	250
92	Buckland Athletic (9)	2–0	Hamworthy Recreation (9)	134
93	Bovey Tracey (9)	2–1	Brimscombe & Thrupp (10)	109
94	Wantage Town (10)	6–0	Newton Abbot Spurs (10)	131
95	Camelford (10)	0–2	Clevedon Town (9)	69
96	Longwell Green Sports (10)	0–3	St Blazey (9)	82
97	Mangotsfield United (9)	3–3 (4–3 p)	Fleetlands (9)	214
98	Highworth Town (9)	3–0	Hamworthy United (10)	143
99	Torridgeside (10)	1–1 (3–5 p)	Honiton Town (10)	105
100	New Milton Town (10)	2–2 (4–2 p)	Brockenhurst (9)	542
101	Cowes Sports (9)	1–1 (4–2 p)	Middlezoy Rovers (10)	208
102	Sherborne Town (9)	0–2	Andover New Street (9)	95
103	Hedge End Rangers (10)	1–2	Devizes Town (9)	190
Sunday 11 October 2026
17	Northwich Victoria (9)	2–0	Retford United (9)	276
80	AFC Aldermaston (10)	2–3	Pagham (9)	80
Tuesday 13 October 2026
68	AFC Greenwich Borough (9)	2–1	Tooting Bec (10)	74

== Second round proper ==
The draw for the second round proper was made on 12 October 2026, with fixtures being played on the weekend of Saturday 31 October. 103 clubs progressed from the first round proper, to which were added a further 25 (20 from Tier 9, and five from Tier 10) bringing the total to 128 clubs. The 25 clubs entering at this stage were clubs which had progressed as far as the Fourth Round Proper in 2025–26, but which were not taking part in the 2026–27 FA Trophy.

Number of teams per tier still in competition
Tier 9	Tier 10	Total
94 / 317	34 / 284	128 / 601

Tie	Home team (Tier) (Note: (9) represents teams allocated to divisions at the 9th tier of English football (otherwise known as Step 5 of the National League System). (10) represents the 10th tier (Step 6 NLS).)	Score	Away team (Tier)	Att.
Friday 30 October 2026
36	Lymore Gardens (10)	1–2	Biggleswade United (9)	85
61	Shepton Mallet (9)	1–2	Bridgwater United (9)	347
Saturday 31 October 2026
1	Maghull (10)	1–5	Retford (9)	289
2	Chadderton (9)	1–1 (1–4 p)	Bottesford Town (9)	114
3	Thornton Cleveleys (10)	4–2	Billingham Town (10)	186
4	Holker Old Boys (10)	1–1 (4–3 p)	Winsford United (9)	141
5	Shildon (9)	1–0	Carlisle City (9)	170
6	West Didsbury & Chorlton (9)	2–0	Prestwich Heys (9)	661
7	Bishop Auckland (9)	4–0	Atherton Laburnum Rovers (9)	330
8	Cheadle Town (9)	1–1 (3–4 p)	Droylsden (9)	279
9	FC St Helens (9)	1–1 (3–5 p)	Boldon CA (10)	225
10	North Shields (9)	2–2 (4–3 p)	Brigg Town CIC (10)	462
11	MSB Woolton (10)	2–0	Durham United (10)	126
13	Sheffield (9)	3–1	South Liverpool (9)	256
14	Nelson (9)	4–1	Parkgate (9)	175
15	Bilston Town (10)	4–2	Heanor Town (9)	250
16	Birstall United (10)	3–3 (6–5 p)	Cinderford Town (9)	191
17	Ashby Ivanhoe (9)	0–2	Gornal Athletic (10)	151
18	Abbey Hulton United (9)	2–2 (4–5 p)	Brocton (9)	128
19	AFC Bridgnorth (10)	0–2	Desborough Town (9)	89
20	Atherstone Town (9)	1–0	GNG Oadby Town (10)	232
21	Lye Town (9)	0–4	Eastwood (9)	145
22	Cirencester Town (9)	0–1	Longlevens (9)	143
23	Southwell City (10)	1–1 (2–3 p)	Rugby Town (9)	181
24	Gresley Rovers (9)	2–1	Ludlow Town (10)	370
25	Sherwood Colliery (9)	5–2	Heather St Johns (10)	73
26	Staveley MW (10)	2–3	Hinckley (9)	329
27	Harrowby United (10)	3–1	Sutton United (Birmingham) (9)	140
28	Belper United (9)	2–0	Northampton ON Chenecks (9)	75
29	Kings Langley (9)	5–0	Holland (10)	160
30	Halesworth Town (10)	2–3	Hadleigh United (10)	152
31	Ampthill Town (10)	2–2 (4–2 p)	Haverhill Rovers (9)	220

Tie	Home team	Score	Away team	Att.
32	Belstone (10)	4–2	Wisbech Town (9)	189
33	Heybridge Swifts (9)	3–0	Everett Rovers (9)	192
34	Risborough Rangers (9)	0–3	Great Yarmouth Town (9)	114
35	Cockfosters (9)	3–0	Norwich United (10)	97
37	Tring Athletic (9)	3–4	Hertford Heath (10)	221
38	Harpenden Town (9)	3–2	West Essex (9)	142
39	St Neots Town (9)	5–0	Saffron Walden Town (9)	302
40	Colney Heath (9)	0–0 (3–2 p)	Benfleet (9)	93
41	White Ensign (9)	5–0	Wormley Rovers (9)	65
42	Lingfield (9)	2–3	Crawley Down Gatwick (9)	87
43	Hassocks (9)	5–2	Eastbourne United (9)	309
44	Rusthall (9)	4–2	Haywards Heath Town (9)	174
45	Larkfield & New Hythe (9)	1–1 (4–2 p)	East Grinstead Town (9)	81
46	Harefield United (9)	1–0	Snodland Town (9)	105
47	Fisher (9)	1–0	AFC Varndeanians (9)	170
48	Northwood (9)	1–2	Reading City (9)	106
49	Pagham (9)	1–5	AFC Greenwich Borough (9)	150
50	Tunbridge Wells (9)	3–2	Ash United (10)	194
51	SE Dons (9)	0–2	Hythe Town (10)	180
52	Cove (10)	1–1 (4–2 p)	Lancing (9)	135
53	Phoenix Sports (9)	6–1	Faversham Strike Force (9)	101
54	Andover New Street (9)	3–3 (3–2 p)	Mangotsfield United (9)	219
55	Downton (9)	1–0	New Milton Town (10)	233
56	Cowes Sports (9)	0–2	Buckland Athletic (9)	165
57	Hallen (9)	3–1	Hythe & Dibden (9)	71
58	Bovey Tracey (9)	3–2	Brixham (9)	243
59	Wantage Town (10)	2–3	St Blazey (9)	156
60	Honiton Town (10)	1–2	Devizes Town (9)	198
62	Amesbury Town (10)	1–2	Highworth Town (9)	77
63	Portishead Town (9)	1–0	Clevedon Town (9)	650
64	Elburton Villa (10)	1–0	Sturminster Newton United (9)	98
Sunday 1 November 2026
12	Northwich Victoria (9)	0–0 (2–3 p)	Yarm & Eaglescliffe (9)	252

== Third round proper ==
The 64 winners from the previous round will play in this round. The draw was made on 2 November 2026. All ties are scheduled for Saturday 28 November 2026, kick-off 3.00pm.

Number of teams per tier still in competition
Tier 9	Tier 10	Total
49 / 319	15 / 304	64 / 623

Tie	Home team	Score	Away team	Att.
Saturday 28 November 2026
1	Nelson (9)	v	Shildon (9)	
2	West Didsbury & Chorlton (9)	v	Retford (9)	
3	MSB Woolton (10)	v	Bishop Auckland (9)	
4	Holker Old Boys (10)	v	North Shields (9)	
5	Droylsden (9)	v	Bottesford Town (9)	
6	Sheffield (9)	v	Boldon CA (10)	
7	Thornton Cleveleys (10)	v	Yarm & Eaglescliffe (9)	
8	Desborough Town (9)	v	Hinckley (9)	
9	Atherstone Town (9)	v	Harrowby United (9)	
10	Belper United (9)	v	Brocton (9)	
11	St Neots Town (9)	v	Eastwood Community (9)	
12	Bilston Town (10)	v	Sherwood Colliery (9)	
13	Rugby Town (9)	v	Birstall United (9)	
14	Gornal Athletic (10)	v	Gresley Rovers (9)	
15	Biggleswade United (9)	v	Great Yarmouth Town (9)	
16	White Ensign (9)	v	Cockfosters (9)	

Tie	Home team	Score	Away team	Att.
17	Kings Langley (9)	v	Harpenden Town (9)	
18	Hadleigh United (9)	v	Heybridge Swifts (9)	
19	Belstone (9)	v	Colney Heath (9)	
20	Hertford Heath (9)	v	Ampthill Town (9)	
21	Larkfield & New Hythe (9)	v	Crawley Down Gatwick (9)	
22	Harefield United (9)	v	Phoenix Sports (9)	
23	Rusthall (9)	v	Hassocks (9)	
24	Greenwich Borough (9)	v	Fisher (9)	
25	Cove (10)	v	Tunbridge Wells (9)	
27	Highworth Town (9)	v	Andover New Street (9)	
28	Portishead Town (9)	v	Hallen (9)	
29	Longlevens (9)	v	Devizes Town (9)	
30	St Blazey (9)	v	Bovey Tracey (10)	
31	Downton (9)	v	Bridgwater United (9)	
32	Elburton Villa (10)	v	Buckland Athletic (9)	
Sunday 29 November 2026
26	Hythe Town (10)	v	Reading City (9)	

== Fourth round proper ==
The 32 winners from the previous round will play in this round.

Number of teams per tier still in competition
Tier 9	Tier 10	Total
27 / 319	15 / 304	32 / 623
