= 1956–57 Sussex County Football League =

Sussex County Football League
- Season: 1956–57
- Champions: Bexhill Town Athletic

The 1956–57 Sussex County Football League season was the 32nd in the history of the competition.

Division 1 was reduced to sixteen teams as Eastbourne United left the league and Rye United being promoted from Division 2. Division 2 now featured fifteen teams from which the winner would be promoted into Division 1.

== Division One ==
The division featured 16 clubs, 15 which competed in the last season, along with one new club:

- Rye United, promoted from last season's Division Two

Hove White Rovers changed name to Hove Town.

=== League table ===
Division One
- Season: 1956–57
- Champions: Bexhill Town Athletic
- Relegated: Lancing Athletic
- Matches played: 240
- Goals scored: 1,133 (4.72 per match)

Pos	Team	Pld	W	D	L	GF	GA	GR	Pts	Qualification or relegation
1	Bexhill Town Athletic	30	18	7	5	86	52	1.654	43	
2	Whitehawk & Manor Farm Old Boys	30	18	5	7	89	57	1.561	41	
3	Arundel	30	19	3	8	93	66	1.409	41	
4	Bognor Regis Town	30	16	7	7	96	71	1.352	39	
5	Chichester City	30	17	3	10	87	58	1.500	37	
6	Littlehampton Town	30	15	7	8	91	71	1.282	37	
7	Southwick	30	14	4	12	60	58	1.034	32	
8	Lewes	30	12	5	13	58	59	0.983	29	
9	Rye United	30	12	2	16	65	82	0.793	26	
10	Hove Town	30	10	6	14	56	81	0.691	26	
11	Brighton Old Grammarians	30	10	5	15	72	81	0.889	25	
12	Newhaven	30	11	2	17	61	76	0.803	24	
13	Shoreham	30	11	1	18	63	68	0.926	23	
14	East Grinstead	30	8	5	17	59	81	0.728	21	
15	Wigmore Athletic	30	8	4	18	49	80	0.613	20	
16	Lancing Athletic	30	8	0	22	48	92	0.522	16	Relegated to Division Two

Source: Non-League Matters
Rules for classification: 1) points; 2) goal difference; 3) number of goals scored.
The points system until the 1982–83 season: 2 points for a win, 1 point for a draw and 0 points for losing.

== Division Two ==
The division featured 15 clubs, 12 which competed in the last season, along with three new clubs:

- Three Bridges United, relegated from last season's Division One
- Brighton North End
- Old Varndeanians

=== League table ===
Division Two
- Season: 1956–57
- Champions: APV Athletic
- Promoted: APV Athletic
- Matches played: 210
- Goals scored: 1,245 (5.93 per match)

Pos	Team	Pld	W	D	L	GF	GA	GR	Pts	Qualification or relegation
1	APV Athletic	28	23	3	2	131	51	2.569	49	Promoted to Division One
2	Old Varndeanians	28	23	2	3	155	42	3.690	48	
3	Sidley United	28	20	2	6	100	56	1.786	42	
4	Three Bridges United	28	19	2	7	123	53	2.321	40	
5	Hailsham	28	12	7	9	76	74	1.027	31	
6	Moulsecoomb Rovers	28	13	5	10	79	78	1.013	31	
7	Brighton North End	28	12	4	12	80	84	0.952	28	
8	Hastings Rangers	28	12	2	14	65	93	0.699	26	
9	Battle Rangers	28	10	5	13	55	74	0.743	25	
10	Hastings & St Leonards	28	8	5	15	84	88	0.955	21	
11	Goldstone	28	10	1	17	57	69	0.826	21	
12	Cuckfield	28	9	3	16	64	97	0.660	21	
13	Seaford Town	28	7	1	20	75	116	0.647	15	
14	Chichester United	28	5	3	20	50	134	0.373	13	Left the league
15	Uckfield Town	28	4	1	23	51	136	0.375	9	

Source: Non-League Matters
Rules for classification: 1) points; 2) goal difference; 3) number of goals scored.
The points system until the 1982–83 season: 2 points for a win, 1 point for a draw and 0 points for losing.
