= Surrey South Eastern Combination =

Association football league in England

- Founded: 1991
- Country: England
- Confederation: FA
- Divisions: 7
- Number of clubs: 79
- Feeder to: Surrey Premier County Football League
- Relegation to: Kingston & District League; Wimbledon & District League
- Current champions: Selhurst (2024–25)
- Website: Football Mitoo

The Surrey South Eastern Combination is one of the three intermediate association football leagues based in the English county of Surrey (the others are the Surrey Premier County Football League and the Surrey County Intermediate League (Western)). It currently comprises clubs from the east of Surrey and parts of Greater London. It was founded in 1991.

The league's top division acts as a feeder to the Surrey Elite Intermediate League. Clubs may be promoted into the league from the Kingston & District League and the Wimbledon & District League.

Currently, the league has seven divisions – two Intermediate Divisions and five Junior Divisions.

== 2025–26 members ==
=== Intermediate Division One ===
- AFC Ewell
- Chelsea Rovers
- Earlsfield
- Earlsfield United
- Exeter Old Boys
- Farleigh Rovers
- Goldfingers
- Kew Park Rangers
- London Hibernian
- Surrey Casuals
- Westminster Casuals
- ~~Westside Reserves~~

=== Intermediate Division Two ===
- ~~AFC Croydon Athletic Development~~
- AFC Surrey
- ~~Battersea Ironsides Reserves~~
- Forestdale
- Grenfell Athletic
- Junction Elite
- NPL
- South Croydon
- Thames United
- Tooting Bec Reserves
- Trenham
- Walton & Hersham 'B'

=== Junior Division One ===
- AFC Morden
- Battersea Ironsides 'A'
- Bunch of Amateurs
- Burgh Heath Athletic
- Cheam Park Rangers
- ~~Jak's~~
- MB
- Old Boys Clapham
- Old Rutlishians
- Timoth 71
- Whitton Town
- Woodmansterne Hyde
- Worcester Park 'A'

=== Junior Division Two ===
- AFC Londinium
- Fetcham Eagles
- Southern Athletic
- South London Casuals
- Surbiton Sports Athletic
- ~~Surbiton Athletic~~
- Tooting Bec 'A'
- Wallington
- Wanderers (2009)
- Worcester Park Reserves

=== Junior Division Three ===
- Ashtead
- East Surrey
- Epsom Casuals
- FC Sutton HKER
- New Elm
- Sporting Kitz Vets
- Sutton High
- Trenham 'A'
- Wandgas
- Westside 'A'

=== Junior Division Four East ===
- AFC North Leatherhead
- Furzedown Fire
- London Olympia East
- Mitcham Athletic
- Motspur Park Reserves
- New Wolves
- NPL Reserves
- Old Boys Clapham Reserves
- Old Rutlishians 'A'
- Surbiton Athletic
- Surbiton Warriors
- Timoth 71 Reserves
- Tooting Bec 'B'

=== Junior Division Four West ===
- AFC Walcountians Reserves
- John Fisher Old Boys
- ~~Kerria Warriors~~
- London Olympia
- Motspur Park
- Old Rutlishians Reserves
- Smart Sport
- ~~Sutton City~~
- Trenham Reserves
- Woodmansterne Hyde Reserves

== Previous champions ==
| Season | Intermediate Division One | Intermediate Division Two | Intermediate Division Three | Junior Division One | Junior Division Two | Junior Division Three | Junior Division Four | Junior Division Five | |
|---|---|---|---|---|---|---|---|---|---|
| 1991–92 | Raynes Park | Coney Hall | Sutton Athletic | Battersea Park Rovers Reserves | Caius Reserves | NPL Reserves | Worcester Park 'A' | | |
| 1992–93 | Holmesdale | Bradbank Sports | Hook Venturers | Coney Hall Reserves | Cobham 'A' | Chessington & Hook United 'A' | Raynes Park 'A' | | |
| 1993–94 | Coney Hall | AFC Wandgas | Chessington White Hart | Worcester Park Reserves | Chessington & Hook United 'A' | Raynes Park 'A' | AFC Wandgas Reserves | | |
| 1994–95 | Bookham | Chessington White Hart | Warbank Sports | Battersea Ironsides Reserves | Accra 94 | Merton Town Reserves | Oxted & District Reserves | | |
| 1995–96 | Racal Decca | Warlingham | Thornton Heath Rovers | Ancora | Raynes Park Vale 'A' | Chipstead 'B' | Watney Sports 'A' | Crescent Rovers 'A' | |
| 1996–97 | Chessington White Hart | Chipstead 'A' | Ancora | Raynes Park Vale 'A' | Fetcham | Thornton Heath Rovers Reserves | St Andrews Reserves | Raynes Park Vale 'C' | |
| 1997–98 | Crescent Rovers | Godstone | Accra 94 | Crescent Rovers Reserves | Rhodrons | Croydon Ductworks | Wandgas Sports | | |
| 1998–99 | Worcester Park | SEELEC Delta | Old Rutlishians | Worcester Park Reserves | Horton | Warlingham Reserves | AFC Ewell Reserves | Halliford Reserves | |
| 1999–2000 | Addington | Sutton High | Bletchingley | Racine | Charlwood Reserves | Old Rutlishians Reserves | Reigate Town | Reigate Priory | |
| 2000–01 | SEELEC Delta | Merton Town | Surbiton Griffins | St Andrews | Old Rutlishians Reserves | Chipstead 'A' | St Andrews Reserves | Thornton Heath Rovers Reserves | |
| 2001–02 | Accra 94 | Greenside | St Andrews | Nuwood | Crescent Rovers 'A' | Colliers Wood United 'A' | Cheam Village Warriors 'A' | | |
| 2002–03 | Warlingham | St Andrews | Nuwood | Battersea | NPL Reserves | Continental Stars Reserves | Sporting Wandgas | | |
| 2003–04 | St Andrews | Guildford Railway Old Boys | NPL | Sporting Wandgas | Continental Stars Reserves | Ditton Reserves | Addington Victors | | |
| 2004–05 | Battersea Ironsides | Sporting Kitz | Battersea Ironsides Reserves | Poynders Park | Worcester Park 'A' | Sporting Kitz Reserves | | | |
| 2005–06 | Battersea Ironsides | Walton Athletic | Refectory Sports | Trinity | Weston Green Sports | Inter Class 'A' | | | |
| 2006–07 | Battersea Ironsides | Epsom Eagles | FC Triangle | Inter Class | Supercala | Trinity Reserves | | | |
| 2007–08 | Battersea Ironsides | Puretown | Sutton High | Weston Green Sports | Trinity | Woodmansterne Hyde Reserves | Shaftesbury Town | | |
| 2008–09 | Oxted & District | FC Triangle | Weston Green Sports | Supercala | Crescent Rovers 'B' | Tadworth Reserves | | | |
| 2009–10 | Tooting Bec | RH123 Athletic | Tolworth Athletic | Tadworth | Pilgrims Well | Surbiton Town | | | |
| 2010–11 | AFC Cubo | Real Holmesdale | Project Clapham | Old Boys Clapham | Shirley Town | Thornton Heath Rovers Reserves | | | |
| 2011–12 | Claygate & Ditton | Project Clapham | Old Boys Clapham | Stoneleigh Town | Epsom Eagles Reserves | Weston Green Sport Reserves | | | |
| 2012–13 | NPL | Old Boys Clapham | UK Football Finder | Old Addiscombe | AFC Ewell | Norton | | | |
| 2013–14 | Balham | St Andrews | Old Boys Clapham Reserves | Kerria Knights | Wanderers | Supercala | | | |
| 2014–15 | Chessington Kings Centre | Westside | Worcester Park 'A' | AFC Ewell | Raynes Park Vale 'B' | Melwood | | | |
| 2015–16 | Westside | Real Holmesdale | AFC Ewell | Battersea Ironsides 'A' | Sporting 50 | Old Rutlishians 'A' | | | |
| Season | Intermediate Division One | Intermediate Division Two | Junior Division One | Junior Division Two | Junior Division Three | Junior Division Four | Junior Division Five | Junior Division Six | |
| 2016–17 | Old Rutlishians | TFT South West | Raynes Park Vale 'A' | Tolworth United | Crescent Rovers 'A' | Real Holmesdale Reserves | | | |
| 2017–18 | Old Rutlishians | Frenches Athletic | AFC Walcountians | Selhurst SA | Sporting Kitz | Sutton High | Nutfield | Reigate Old Boys | |
| 2018–19 | Old Rutlishians | Earlsfield United | Battersea Boys | Old Boys Clapham | Thames United | Selhurst SA | Croygas Falcons | | |
| Season | Intermediate Division One | Intermediate Division Two | Intermediate Division Three | Junior Division One | Junior Division Two | Junior Division Three | Junior Division Four | Junior Division Five | Junior Division Six |
| 2019–20 | West Fulham | Sporting 50 | Battersea Boys | Sporting Kitz | Selhurst SA | Warlingham | Colliers Wood Town | Motspur Park Reserves | |
| 2020–21 | AFC Walcountians | Wimbledon Casuals | Richmond & Kew | Selhurst | Woodmansterne Hyde Reserves | South Croydon | AFC Walcountians Reserves | NPL 'B' | Purley Old Boys |
| Season | Intermediate Division One | Intermediate Division Two | Junior Division One | Junior Division Two | Junior Division Three | Junior Division Four | Junior Division Five | Junior Division Six | |
| 2021–22 | Wimbledon Casuals | Chelsea Rovers | Banstead Rovers | Doverhouse Lions | Pavletico Rovers | Worcester Park Development | Westside 'A' | Ashtead Reserves | |
| Season | Intermediate Division One | Intermediate Division Two | Junior Division One | Junior Division Two | Junior Division Three | Junior Division Four | Junior Division Five | | |
| 2022–23 | Banstead Rovers | Westside Reserves | RC Old Boys | Wandgas Vets | Colliers Wood Town | NPL 'A' | Waddon Wanderers | | |
| Season | Intermediate Division One | Intermediate Division Two | Junior Division One | Junior Division Two | Junior Division Three | Junior Division Four East | Junior Division Four West | | |
| 2023–24 | Banstead Rovers | Exeter Old Boys | Surrey Casuals | Walton Hill | Woodmansterne Hyde | Sporting Kitz | Wallington | | |
| 2024–25 | Selhurst | AFC Ewell | Grenfell Athletic | Timoth 71 Reds | AFC Londinium | New Elm | Sporting Kitz | | |
