= 1957–58 Sussex County Football League =

Sussex County Football League
- Season: 1957–58
- Champions: Arundel

The 1957–58 Sussex County Football League season was the 33nd in the history of the competition.

Division 1 remained at sixteen teams and Rye United was promoted from Division 2. Division 2 also remained at fifteen teams from which the winner would be promoted into Division 1.

== Division One ==
The division featured 16 clubs, 15 which competed in the last season, along with one new club:

- APV Athletic, promoted from last season's Division Two

=== League table ===
Division One
- Season: 1957–58
- Champions: Arundel
- Relegated: Brighton Old Grammarians
- Matches played: 240
- Goals scored: 1,154 (4.81 per match)

Pos	Team	Pld	W	D	L	GF	GA	GR	Pts	Qualification or relegation
1	Arundel	30	22	5	3	103	49	2.102	49	
2	Bexhill Town Athletic	30	21	4	5	76	38	2.000	46	
3	APV Athletic	30	19	4	7	93	66	1.409	42	
4	Littlehampton Town	30	17	7	6	86	49	1.755	41	
5	Whitehawk & Manor Farm Old Boys	30	16	6	8	95	66	1.439	38	
6	Newhaven	30	14	5	11	63	49	1.286	33	
7	Wigmore Athletic	30	12	8	10	88	62	1.419	32	
8	Rye United	30	11	8	11	74	72	1.028	30	
9	Chichester City	30	12	4	14	80	79	1.013	28	
10	Hove Town	30	9	8	13	57	81	0.704	26	
11	Bognor Regis Town	30	9	6	15	64	91	0.703	24	
12	Shoreham	30	9	5	16	85	92	0.924	23	
13	Southwick	30	9	5	16	41	63	0.651	23	
14	Lewes	30	7	5	18	59	109	0.541	19	
15	East Grinstead	30	5	7	18	47	90	0.522	17	
16	Brighton Old Grammarians	30	2	5	23	43	98	0.439	9	Relegated to Division Two

Source: Non-League Matters
Rules for classification: 1) points; 2) goal difference; 3) number of goals scored.
The points system until the 1982–83 season: 2 points for a win, 1 point for a draw and 0 points for losing.

== Division Two ==
The division featured 15 clubs, 13 which competed in the last season, along with two new clubs:

- Lancing Athletic, relegated from last season's Division One and changed name to Lancing
- Portslade

=== League table ===
Division Two
- Season: 1957–58
- Champions: Lancing
- Promoted: Lancing
- Matches played: 210
- Goals scored: 979 (4.66 per match)

Pos	Team	Pld	W	D	L	GF	GA	GR	Pts	Qualification or relegation
1	Lancing	28	22	3	3	97	34	2.853	47	Promoted to Division One
2	Old Varndeanians	28	21	2	5	74	33	2.242	44	
3	Sidley United	28	17	3	8	69	61	1.131	37	
4	Uckfield Town	28	15	4	9	82	65	1.262	34	
5	Three Bridges United	28	14	4	10	81	62	1.306	32	
6	Hastings Rangers	28	14	3	11	70	67	1.045	31	
7	Cuckfield	28	13	2	13	72	62	1.161	28	
8	Goldstone	28	10	6	12	53	57	0.930	26	
9	Brighton North End	28	11	4	13	53	58	0.914	26	
10	Portslade	28	9	5	14	60	60	1.000	23	
11	Hailsham	28	9	4	15	58	68	0.853	22	
12	Moulsecoomb Rovers	28	8	5	15	63	74	0.851	21	
13	Battle Rangers	28	7	4	17	58	90	0.644	18	
14	Seaford Town	28	7	3	18	46	95	0.484	17	
15	Hastings & St Leonards	28	7	0	21	43	93	0.462	14	

Source: Non-League Matters
Rules for classification: 1) points; 2) goal difference; 3) number of goals scored.
The points system until the 1982–83 season: 2 points for a win, 1 point for a draw and 0 points for losing.
