= 1958–59 Sussex County Football League =

Sussex County Football League
- Season: 1958–59
- Champions: Arundel

The 1958–59 Sussex County Football League season was the 34th in the history of the competition.

Division 1 remained at sixteen teams and Lancing was promoted from Division 2. Division 2 was increased to sixteen teams with Burgess Hill joining. from which the winner would be promoted into Division 1.

== Division One ==
The division featured 16 clubs, 15 which competed in the last season, along with one new club:

- Lancing, promoted from last season's Division Two

=== League table ===
Division One
- Season: 1958–59
- Champions: Arundel
- Relegated: None
- Matches played: 240
- Goals scored: 1,122 (4.68 per match)

Pos	Team	Pld	W	D	L	GF	GA	GR	Pts	Qualification or relegation
1	Arundel	30	19	3	8	109	59	1.847	41	
2	Lewes	30	18	4	8	77	51	1.510	40	
3	Chichester City	30	17	2	11	103	81	1.272	36	
4	Shoreham	30	14	8	8	65	63	1.032	36	
5	Whitehawk & Manor Farm Old Boys	30	15	5	10	83	67	1.239	35	
6	Bexhill Town Athletic	30	14	7	9	82	82	1.000	35	
7	East Grinstead	30	15	3	12	67	55	1.218	33	
8	Wigmore Athletic	30	12	7	11	59	61	0.967	31	
9	APV Athletic	30	11	8	11	74	77	0.961	30	
10	Lancing	30	13	3	14	66	64	1.031	29	
11	Newhaven	30	12	5	13	53	54	0.981	29	
12	Southwick	30	10	8	12	55	54	1.019	28	
13	Rye United	30	10	6	14	76	77	0.987	26	
14	Littlehampton Town	30	8	8	14	72	75	0.960	24	
15	Bognor Regis Town	30	9	5	16	52	74	0.703	23	
16	Hove Town	30	0	4	26	29	128	0.227	4	Left the league

Source: Non-League Matters
Rules for classification: 1) points; 2) goal difference; 3) number of goals scored.
The points system until the 1982–83 season: 2 points for a win, 1 point for a draw and 0 points for losing.

== Division Two ==
The division featured 16 clubs, 14 which competed in the last season, along with two new clubs:

- Brighton Old Grammarians, relegated from last season's Division One
- Burgess Hill

=== League table ===
Division Two
- Season: 1958–59
- Champions: Sidley United
- Promoted: Sidley United
- Matches played: 240
- Goals scored: 1,320 (5.5 per match)

Pos	Team	Pld	W	D	L	GF	GA	GR	Pts	Qualification or relegation
1	Sidley United	30	26	1	3	160	49	3.265	53	Promoted to Division One
2	Old Varndeanians	30	21	5	4	103	38	2.711	47	
3	Brighton North End	30	19	3	8	98	63	1.556	41	
4	Portslade	30	19	2	9	98	70	1.400	40	
5	Brighton Old Grammarians	30	18	3	9	96	55	1.745	39	
6	Uckfield Town	30	16	5	9	105	64	1.641	37	
7	Seaford Town	30	15	7	8	100	65	1.538	37	
8	Three Bridges United	30	16	3	11	94	61	1.541	35	
9	Hastings Rangers	30	14	3	13	102	83	1.229	31	
10	Moulsecoomb Rovers	30	13	1	16	67	75	0.893	27	
11	Hastings & St Leonards	30	12	2	16	65	99	0.657	26	
12	Burgess Hill	30	7	4	19	58	92	0.630	18	
13	Cuckfield	30	6	3	21	34	115	0.296	15	Left the league
14	Hailsham	30	6	2	22	56	143	0.392	14	
15	Goldstone	30	5	4	21	39	104	0.375	14	
16	Battle Rangers	30	1	4	25	45	144	0.313	6	

Source: Non-League Matters
Rules for classification: 1) points; 2) goal difference; 3) number of goals scored.
The points system until the 1982–83 season: 2 points for a win, 1 point for a draw and 0 points for losing.
