= Ringmer A.F.C. =

Coordinates: 50°53′36.85″N 0°4′6.03″E

Ringmer
- Full name: Ringmer Association Football Club
- Founded: 2020; 6 years ago
- Ground: King's Academy, Ringmer
- Chairman: Murray Barnett
- Manager: Dan Barnett
- League: Southern Combination Division One
- 2025–26: Southern Combination Division One, 15th of 18
Home colours

Ringmer Association Football Club is a football club based in Ringmer, England. They are currently members of the Southern Combination Division One and play at the Caburn Community Ground, at King's Academy, Ringmer.

== History ==
In 2020, Ringmer A.F.C. was formed by the merger of AFC Ringmer and Ringmer, joining the Mid Sussex League. In 2022, the club was admitted into the Southern Combination Division One. In a Twitter statement dated 30 May 2022, however, AFC announced that they had decided not to pursue promotion and would remain in the Mid Sussex Football League.

== Ground ==
The club currently play at the Caburn Community Ground, King's Academy, Ringmer.
