= St Andrews F.C. (London) =

St Andrews
- Full name: St Andrews Football Club
- Founded: 1888
- Ground: Wimbledon Common Extension, Wimbledon
Home colours

St Andrews Football Club is a football club based in Wimbledon, England.

== History ==
St Andrews were formed in 1888, winning their first game, beating Eton Mission 1–0. During the 1970s and 1980s, the club won the Surrey Intermediate Cup and Surrey Invitation Shield a number of times. In 1992, the club won the Surrey County Premier League, losing just one game out of 26, gaining admission into the Spartan League as a result of their success. St Andrews finished midtable in their first season in the Spartan League, finishing ninth. In the following season, the club entered the FA Vase, losing 4–2 against Newhaven in the extra preliminary round. Midway through the 1993–94 season, St Andrews resigned from the league.

Following their stint in the Spartan League, St Andrews dropped into the Surrey South Eastern Combination.

== Ground ==
During St Andrews' stint in the Spartan League, the club played at the Herne Hill Stadium. The club later moved to the Wimbledon Common Extension.

== Records ==
- Best FA Vase performance: Extra preliminary round, 1993–94
