= David Bielkus =

Scottish footballer

Personal information
- Full name: David Malcolm Bielkus
- Date of birth: 22 March 1945 (age 81)
- Place of birth: Glasgow, Scotland
- Position: Defender

Youth career
- Arsenal
- Millwall

Senior career*
| Years | Team | Apps | (Gls) |
- Cheltenham Town
| 1966–1968 | Telstar | | |
- Ashford Town (Kent)
- Tonbridge Angels

Managerial career
- 1984: Ringmer
- 1985–1986: Ringmer
- * Club domestic league appearances and goals

David Malcolm Bielkus (born 22 March 1945) is a Scottish former professional football defender. He played in England and the Netherlands for Arsenal, Millwall, Cheltenham Town, Telstar, Ashford Town (Kent), and Tonbridge Angels. He also went on to manage English non-league club Ringmer.
