= Warlingham F.C. =

Association football club in England

Warlingham
- Full name: Warlingham Football Club
- Nicknames: The Wars, The Hammers The burge
- Founded: 1896
- Ground: Church Road, Warlingham
- Chairman: Mick Rolfe
- Manager: Steve/Mick Rolfe
- League: Mid-Sussex League Division One
- 2024–25: Mid-Sussex League Division One, 3rd of 9
- Website: http://www.pitchero.com/clubs/warlingham/
Home colours

Warlingham Football Club is a football club based in Warlingham, Surrey, England. The club are members of the Mid-Sussex League Division One and play at the Verdayne Sports Ground. Church Lane in Warlingham

== History ==
Warlingham Football Club was formed in 1896. In the 1920s, the club merged with Warlingham Cricket Club to form Warlingham Sports Club. Warlingham entered the Combined Counties League Division One in 2004 after winning the Surrey South Eastern Combination in 2002–03. The club won the league in 2005–06 but were not promoted to the Premier Division due to ground grading. In 2010–11, the club reached the Second Round of the FA Vase and in 2011–12, the club won the Combined Counties League Division One Cup. In the same season, the club competed in the FA Cup for the first time.

== Ground ==
Warlingham played their homes games at Whyteleafe's home ground at Church Road, Whyteleafe from the 2010–11 season until 2013 when they moved back to their own unfloodlit ground. The club now uses Church Lane in Warlingham for all its sides, but its first team had to play at Whyteleafe's home ground so they could continue to participate in the Combined Counties League. This agreement ended when Warlingham resigned from the Combined Counties League at the end of the 2012–13 season.

== Honours ==
=== League honours ===
- Combined Counties League Division One
  - Champions (1): 2005–06
- Surrey South Eastern Combination
  - Champions (1): 2002–03

=== Cup honours ===
- Combined Counties League Division One Cup
  - Winners (1): 2011–12
- Surrey Saturday Premier Cup
  - Runners-Up (1): 2004–05
- Surrey Saturday Intermediate Cup
  - Winners (1): 2003–04
  - Runners-Up (1): 1946–47
- Surrey Saturday Junior Cup
  - Runners up (1): 1998–99
- Surrey Lower Junior Cup:
  - Runners up (1): 1930–31
- Oxted Hospital Cup :
  - Winners (1): 1960–61

== Records ==
- Highest League Position: 1st in Combined Counties League Division One 2005–06
- FA Cup best performance: Extra Preliminary Round 2011–12, 2012–13
- FA Vase best performance: Second Round 2010–11
