= Minster F.C. =

Association football club in England

Minster Football Club
- Founded: 1911
- Ground: Hartsdown Park
- Chairman: Colin Holden
- Manager: Ian Wallace
- League: Southern Counties East League Division One
- 2025–26: Kent County League Premier Division, 2nd of 19 (promoted)
Home colours	Away colours	Third colours

Minster Football Club are an association football club from the village of Minster in Thanet, Kent. The club are currently members of Southern Counties East League Division One, the tenth level of the English football league system (Step 6 of the National League System). Minster currently groundshare with Margate at Hartsdown Park having previously mostly played at the Minster Recreation Ground.

== History ==
The club was founded in 1911 and initially played friendly matches as Minster Wanderers. It commenced competing in league football as an amateur club from the 1912–13 season with two teams in local district leagues: as Minster in the Sittingbourne, Milton, & District League, and as Minster United in the Sheppey League. In its second competitive season Minster United were winners of Sheppey League Division One.

After competitive football resumed following World War I Minster United became a separate entity and in 1919 rejoined Division One of the Sheppey League and in 1920 became members of the Kent League Division Two (West section); five seasons later the club won the 1925–26 Kent League Division Two (Mid Kent section) championship. The club continued to play in the Sheppey League as a secondary competition and won multiple championships (1920, 1922, and three successive seasons between 1923–24 and 1925–26). During the latter part of this period the club played at Sheppey United's Botany Road ground however, unable to secure a lease on a ground Minster United withdrew from league competition in the summer of 1927.

Minster F.C. restarted playing league matches after the war from the 1921–22 season, at a lower standard than Minster United, as members of the Thanet Junior League Division Two. The following season the club entered a reserve team into Division Three of the same league and a season later in 1924 the 2nd XI were Division Three champions. The 1924–25 season saw a retrenchment by the club with only the first team playing in the Thanet Junior League (Thanet League) Division Three in which it secured the runners-up position and subsequently returned to Division Two. After five seasons in Division Two in 1930 Minster once again decided to drop to Division Three and over the ensuing 1930–31 season won the divisional championship. The following season, upon the club's return to Division Two it won a second successive championship. As one of the previous season's three leading Division Two clubs, Minster became members of Division One for the 1934–35 season. Over the subsequent 1935–36 season the club finished at the foot of the divisional table and returned to Division Two. Minster remained in this division until the outbreak of the World War II when the league contracted to a single division for the 1939–40 season during which, in February 1940, the club withdrew from the competition.

On resumption of competitive football following the war, in 1946 Minster joined the revived single division Thanet League in which the club finished eleventh of twelve teams – mid-season there had been some concern that the club could be disbanded through lack of interest. For the 1947–48 season the league expanded to two divisions with Minster members of Division Two; the club finished sixth of the eight teams in the division and the next season improved its divisional standing to third position. In August 1949 Minster adopted new club colours of blue and white jerseys and white shorts and would continue with these colours through the 1960s (when it's players wore contrasting blue quartered jerseys) before changing back to amber and black colours. Following the initial colour change, over the 1949–50 season, the club were champions of Division Two, winning 26 of its 28 matches with one match drawn and one defeat, with 116 goals scored and only 23 conceded and completed a league and cup double by winning the Division Two Benevolent Cup

Minster were transferred into the Thanet League Division One for the subsequent 1950–51 season and over the next two seasons enjoyed continued success: the club won the Division One Benevolent Cup and were Division One joint runners-up for the 1951–52 season and the following season attained one position higher in the league to become 1952–53 Division One joint champions, finishing on equal points with Rice and Son (with Minster's better goal average not a consideration). The club remained in Division One for two further seasons until 1955 when it withdrew from the league (which had reduced to a single division). In July 1956 after a single season absence Minster rejoined the Thanet League and that season, 1956–57, were the Division One Cup runners-up. Two seasons later Minster were county cup finalists, losing heavily (13–1) in the 1959 Kent Junior B Cup to fellow Thanet League club Ramsgate St Luke's. In April 1959 the club accepted an invitation to step up from district to county level football to the expanding Kent Amateur League Eastern Section and recorded a fifth placed finish in the 1959–60 Division One: Northern Zone table. This was sufficient to earn a position in the next season's Eastern Section Premier Division however, citing financial reasons the club withdrew and in 1960 reverted to the Thanet League

Over the next six seasons in the Thanet League Division One Minster enjoyed a period in which the club were at least runners-up in either or both of the league and cup competitions: over the 1960–61 season Minster were both league and league cup runners-up; 1961–62 league runners-up; 1962–63 league runners-up (for a third successive occasion) and league cup winners; 1963–64 league and cup double winners; 1964–65 league and cup double winners (a second successive double and a third successive cup triumph); and 1965–66, for the third successive occasion, Division One champions. Additionally in 1964 the club triumphed at county level winning the Kent Junior B Cup, defeating Kent Amateur League Eastern Section Division Two club London Road 2–0. There was also success for Minster Reserves, who over the 1965–66 season were Thanet League Division Two league and cup double winners and lost out on a treble when defeated 7–0 in the Kent Junior C Cup final by Thanet League Division One club G A Harvey's.

Following this successful period Minster were elected in 1966 to the Canterbury and District League Premier Division where the club continued its run of success by winning the championship over the 1966–67 season. For the next two seasons the club finished third in the Premier Division but was unable to maintain that level and progressively slipped down the rankings over the next few seasons: Minster finished just above the bottom two relegation places in the league table over the 1972–73 season, after which the club withdrew from the league.

Minster rejoined the Thanet League in 1973 for an unbroken thirty season membership and finished seventh of nine Division One clubs over the 1973–74 season. For the 1979–80 season the club were Division One and League Cup runners-up however, the club went through a trough in the early 1980s when it struggled to complete a season owing to a lack of players and support and in the mid 1980s Minster were playing in Division Two. In 1986 the club began a revival when it won the Division Two Cup and were Thanet League Cup runners-up; the following season, 1986–87, the club was again victorious in the Division Two Cup final and additionally won the Consolation Cup. Minster returned to Division One in 1989 as Division Two champions with an unbeaten record, winning 21 of 22 matches and scoring 100 goals with 16 conceded. Three seasons later in 1992 the club finished bottom of the Division One table with a contrastingly dismal record – without a win and with two draws over fourteen matches but, owing to expansion of the division escaped relegation. However, with a similar record the over the 1992–93 season when the club again occupied last place in the division it was relegated to Division Two. Minster immediately bounced back to Division One after winning the 1993–94 season Division Two championship and completed a double after also winning the Division Two Cup. The club struggled on its return to the higher division and finished second to bottom in 1995 but again owing to divisional expansion were not relegated – in the League Trophy competition that season Minster were losing finalists. After several seasons as a lower mid-table club performances improved towards the end of the decade and in 1999 it was losing League Cup finalists. Two seasons later Minster won the 2000–01 Thanet League Division One championship and in 2002 were Kent Junior A Cup finalists, losing the final 1–0 after extra time.

In 2003 Minster left the Thanet League and once again took-up membership of the Canterbury and District League, joining Division One for the 2003–04 season; over the following 2004–05 season, in which the club adopted a blue coloured playing strip, it won the divisional championship earning promotion to the Premier Division. After only one season in that division in 2006 the club left the Canterbury League and retraced its steps to the Thanet League Division One. After two seasons in mid-table Minster were relegated following the 2008–09 season to Division Two with a playing record of fifteen losses and one draw from sixteen matches; In the next season the club won the 2010 Division Two Cup after which, for the 2010–11 season, the Thanet League was reconfigured to an expanded single division. Minster struggled towards the bottom of the division for two seasons after which for both the 2012–13 and 2013–14 seasons the club finished in last position. Thereafter the Thanet League was struggling to remain a viable entity and in 2014 Minster rejoined the Canterbury & District League (the Thanet League in its existing format discontinued the following season). In the club's first season as members of the Canterbury League Division Two it finished the season seventh from eight clubs after which it won four successive Canterbury League divisional championships (incorporating three promotions): in 2016 Division Two winners with an unbeaten record (P12; W11; D1; L0, after expunging the four matches of Chilham Reserves who withdrew from the league); 2017 Division One winners, losing only one league match (P14; W13; D0; L1); and two successive Premier Division championships in 2018 and 2019. The club completed a league and cup double in the earlier of the latter two seasons after being awarded a walkover result over Red Arrow FC in the Canterbury & District Challenge Cup final.

After the 2019 championship win Minster joined the Kent County League Division Three Central & East. Over the 2019–20 season, which was curtailed and subsequently voided owing to the COVID-19 pandemic, the club recorded wins in all its fourteen league matches played and as the club with the best playing record were promoted. The 2020–21 season was abandoned shortly after commencing owing to the continuing COVID-19 pandemic, prior to which Minster recorded seven wins from seven matches completed and were again promoted. Upon resumption of league competition following the pandemic over the 2021–22 season Minster, who had returned to an amber and black playing strip, were the Division One Central & East runners-up (missing-out on the championship to Tenterden Town on goal difference) and promoted to the Kent County League Premier Division; additionally this season the club were winners of the Bill Manklow Inter-Regional Challenge Cup (the League Cup) after defeating divisional rivals Snodland Town Reserves 3–0. Over the following four seasons Minster were Premier Division runners-up on three occasions: 2022–23, 2024–25 and 2025–26. In county football competition the club won the Kent Intermediate Challenge Shield in 2023–24, defeating Halls Athletic on penalties in the final; and Minster Reserves (who at the time were members of the Kent County League Division One Central & East) were losing finalists in the 2024–25 season Kent Junior C Cup 4–0 to West Wickham Fourths.

Following the 2025–26 season the Kent County League champions Hawkinge Town were denied promotion to the Southern Counties East League owing to ground grading issues and in their place runners-up Minster applied for promotion and were granted membership to the Southern Counties East League First Division for the 2026–27 season.

== Season-by-season ==
Season	League	Division	P	W	D	L	GF	GA	Pts	Pos	Notes
2006–07	Thanet & District League	Division 1	14	5	1	8	23	37	16	5/8	
2007–08	Thanet & District League	Division 1	18	5	7	6	34	34	22	6/10	
2008–09	Thanet & District League	Division 1	16	0	1	15	20	66	1	9/9	Relegated
2009–10	Thanet & District League	Division 2	10	5	1	4	16	39	23	3/6	Division 2 Cup winners
2010–11	Thanet & District League	Division 1	22	7	1	14	50	62	22	9/12	
2011–12	Thanet & District League	Division 1	24	7	3	14	46	73	24	11/13	
2012–13	Thanet & District League	Division 1	14	2	1	11	18	62	7	8/8	
2013–14	Thanet & District League	Division 1	12	1	1	10	24	59	4	7/7	
2014–15	Canterbury & District League	Division 2	14	5	1	8	30	39	16	7/8	
2015–16	Canterbury & District League	Division 2†	12	11	1	0	45	12	34	1/6	Champions; promoted
2016–17	Canterbury & District League	Division 1	14	13	0	1	37	13	39	1/8	Champions; promoted
2017–18	Canterbury & District League	Premier Division	14	11	2	1	46	16	35	1/8	Champions
2018–19	Canterbury & District League	Premier Division	14	9	2	3	43	26	29	1/8	Champions; joined Kent; County League
2019–20	Kent County League	Division Three Central & East	League void (COVID-19 pandemic) (Playing record: P14; W14; GF81; GA7)								Promoted
2020–21	Kent County League	Division Two Central & East	League void (COVID-19 pandemic) (Playing record: P7; W7; GF32; GA9)								Promoted
2021–22	Kent County League	Division One Central & East	26	18	4	4	73	33	58	2/14	Promoted; Bill Manklow; Cup winners
2022–23	Kent County League	Premier Division	30	19	6	5	70	34	63	2/16	
2023–24	Kent County League	Premier Division	30	15	6	9	74	45	51	4/16	Kent Intermediate Challenge; Shield winners
2024–25	Kent County League	Premier Division	32	22	4	6	81	38	70	2/17	
2025–26	Kent County League	Premier Division	36	25	5	6	100	49	80	2/19	Promoted to Southern Counties East League First Division
†: 2015–16 Canterbury & District League Division Two: Record after the four matches played by Chilham Reserves expunged

== Honours ==
League

- Sheppey League
  - Division One
    - Champions: 1913–14
- Thanet League
  - Division One
    - Champions: 1952–53 (joint); 1963–64; 1964–65; 1965–66; 2000–01
    - Runners-up: 1951–52 (joint); 1960–61; 1961–62; 1962–63; 1979–80
  - Division Two
    - Champions: 1931–32; 1949–50; 1988–89; 1993–94
  - Division Three
    - Champions: 1931–31
    - Runners-up: 1924–25
- Canterbury & District League
  - Premier Division
    - Champions: 1966–67; 2017–18; 2018–19
  - Division One
    - Champions: 2004–05; 2016–17
  - Division Two
    - Champions: 2015–16
- Kent County League
  - Premier Division
    - Runners-up: 2022–23; 2024–25; 2025–26
  - Division One Central & East
    - Runners-up: 2021–22
  - Division Two Central & East
    - Highest points per game (COVID-19 affected): 2020–21
  - Division Three Central & East
    - Highest points per game (COVID-19 affected): 2019–20

Cup

- Kent FA:
  - Kent Intermediate Challenge Shield
    - Winners: 2023–24
  - Kent Junior A Cup
    - Runners-up: 2001–02
  - Kent Junior B Cup
    - Winners: 1963–64
    - Runners-up: 1958–59
- Thanet League
  - League Cup Winners: 1962–63; 1963–64; 1964–65
  - Division One Cup Winners: 1951–52
  - Division Two Cup Winners: 1949–50; 1985–86; 1986–87; 1988–89; 1993–94; 2009–10;
- Canterbury & District League
  - Canterbury & District Challenge Cup Winners: 2017–18
- Kent County League
  - Bill Manklow Inter-Regional Challenge Cup Winners: 2021–22

== Records ==
- Best FA Vase performance: Second qualifying round, 2026–27

== Stadium ==
Minster has for most of its history played within the village at the King George V Recreation Ground. For the 2023–24 season the club were tenants of Ramsgate at the Southwood Stadium – this arrangement was curtailed after one season as the Minster directors believed the host club were seeking an element of control which would lead to Minster becoming Ramsgate's feeder club. The club returned to the Recreation Ground in Minster for one season before from July 2025, requiring a facility meeting higher ground grading requirements, it commenced a groundshare with Margate at Hartsdown Park.
