= Frederick Parris =

English cricketer and umpire (1867–1941)

Fred Parris
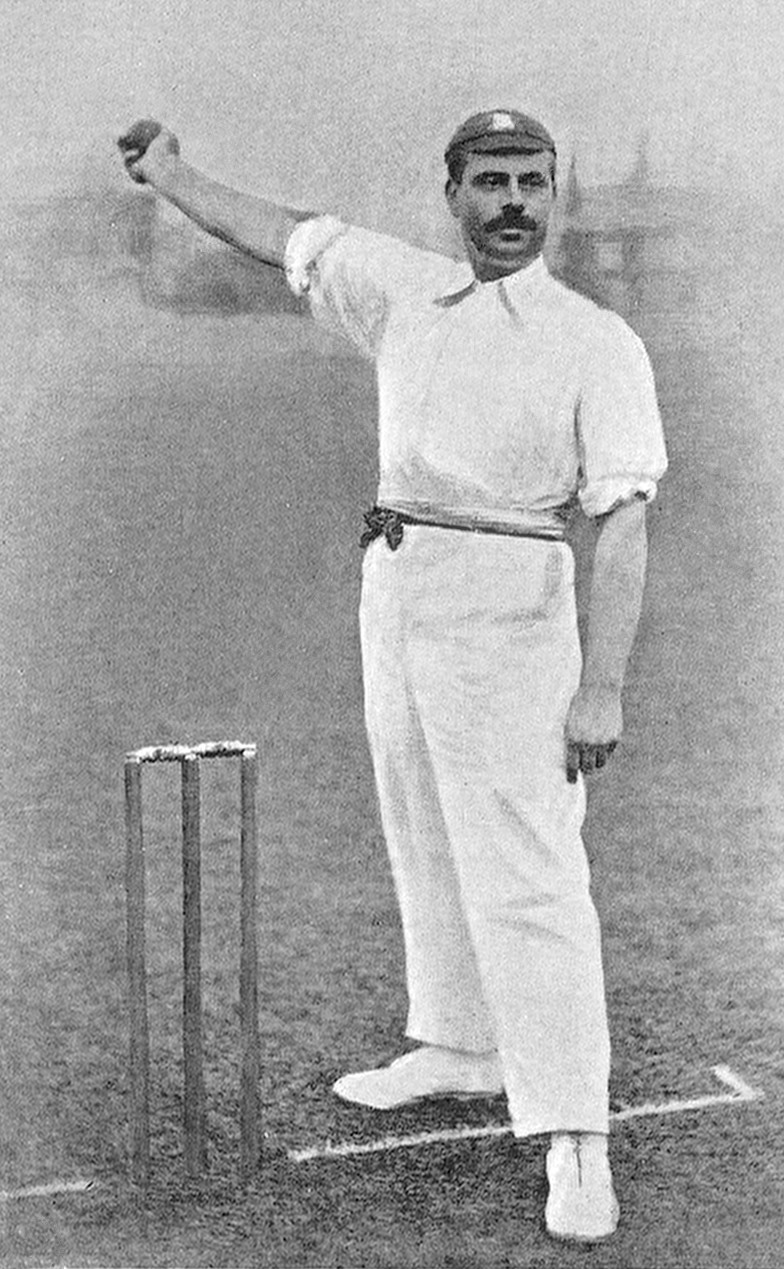

Personal information
- Full name: Frederick Parris
- Born: 20 September 1867; Ringmer, Sussex, England
- Died: 17 January 1941 (aged 73); Cuckfield, Sussex, England
- Batting: Left-handed
- Bowling: Right-arm medium

Domestic team information
- Years: Team
- 1890–1901: Sussex

Umpiring information
- Tests umpired: 1 (1909–1909)

Career statistics
Competition	First-class
Matches	105
Runs scored	2,222
Batting average	14.52
100s/50s	0/7
Top score	77
Balls bowled	17,548
Wickets	291
Bowling average	25.90
5 wickets in innings	20
10 wickets in match	5
Best bowling	8/28
Catches/stumpings	59/–
- Source: CricketArchive, 6 November 2012

Frederick Parris (20 September 1867 – 17 January 1941) was a first-class cricketer and Test match umpire.

Parris was born in Ringmer, Sussex and played 105 games for Sussex between 1890 and 1901 as a right-arm slow-medium bowler and left-handed batsman. He took 291 wickets at a bowling average of 25.90, with best bowling of 8–28 against Gloucestershire in 1894. He also took 7–70 in Gloucestershire's first innings. He took 5 wickets in an innings 20 times and 10 wickets in a match on 5 occasions. He scored 2,222 runs in 177 innings, at a batting average of 14.52, with a highest score of 77 against Oxford University in 1898.

Parris umpired in one first-class match in 1900, between Sussex and Cambridge University, he took up more regular umpiring in 1908, standing frequently in first-class matches either side of the First World War, until August 1929. He umpired one Test match, the 1st Test between England and Australia at Edgbaston in May 1909. The bowling of George Hirst (4-28 and 5-58) and Colin Blythe (6-44 and 5-58) – who between them bowled all but 5 of England's 98.5 overs and took all 20 Australian wickets on a slow and wet pitch – and confident batting of Jack Hobbs and C. B. Fry on the last day, allowed England to win the match by 10 wickets.

Parris died in Cuckfield, Sussex.
