= Mid Sussex Football League =

Association football league in England

- Founded: 1900
- Country: England
- Divisions: 11
- Number of clubs: 120
- Level on pyramid: Level 11 (Premier Division)
- Feeder to: Southern Combination Football League
- Promotion to: Southern Combination Football League Division Two
- Current champions: Ringmer A.F.C. (2023–24)
- Website: Official website

The Mid Sussex Football League is an association football league formed in 1900. The league is headed by the Premier Division which is at level eleven of the English football league system and member clubs are based in East Sussex, West Sussex and south-eastern Surrey. Current sponsors are Gray Hooper Holt LLP and the league is currently known as the Gray Hooper Holt LLP Mid Sussex League.

== History ==
The league was founded in 1900, made up of seven founder clubs: Ardingly, Burgess Hill, Crawley, Cuckfield, Haywards Heath, Hurstpierpoint and Three Bridges. League rules stipulated clubs had to be from within a twelve-mile radius of Haywards Heath, where the league was founded. In 1903 a second division was formed and the league was accepting membership from clubs based on the south coast. A third division was formed in 1921 and divisions four and five formed in the 1950s.

The Premier Division was formed in 1974 to replace Division One as the top division and another four divisions were added throughout the 1980s and 1990s. In 2002 the league took over management of the Mid Sussex Football Association Senior and Junior Charity Cups following the disbandment of the Mid Sussex Football Association. The Championship Division was formed in 2010.

== Member clubs (2026–27) ==
Premier Division

- AFC Uckfield Town
- Balcombe
- BN Dons
- Crowhurst
- Cuckfield Rangers
- Cuckfield Town
- EMC Academy
- Frenches Athletic
- Holland Sports
- Hollington United
- Lindfield
- Reigate Priory II
- Rotherfield
- Westfield II

Championship

- AS Crawley
- AFC Uckfield Town Second
- Copthorne Reserves
- Forest Row Reserve
- Hailsham Town Reserves
- Polegate Town
- Reigatians
- Roffey Reserves
- Sovereign Saints

Division One North

- Ashurst Wood
- Balcombe Reserves
- BoA
- Jarvis Brook Reserves
- Old Oxted Town
- Oxted & District
- Reigatians Reserves
- Wakehams Green
- Warlingham

Division One South

- AFC Varndeanians Reserves
- Barcombe
- Newhaven Reserves
- Preston Manor Royals
- Ridgewood
- Ringmer Second
- Rotherfield Reserves
- Seaford Town Reserves
- Welcroft Park Rangers
- Willingdon Athletic

Division Two North

- Caterham
- Charlwood Village
- Crawley & Maidenbower Panthers
- Crawley United
- Frenches Athletic Reserves
- Gatwick Warriors
- Ifield
- Lindfield Reserves
- Reigate Priory 'A'

Division Two South

- BN Dons Reserves
- Buxted
- Cuckfield Rangers Reserves
- Cuckfield Town Reserves
- Eastbourne Athletic
- Hurstpierpoint Reserves
- Nutley
- Portslade Athletic
- Ringmer Third
- Southwick

Division Three North

- AS Crawley II
- Ansty
- Athletico Redhill
- BoA II
- Copthorne 'A'
- EMC Academy II
- Holland Sports II
- Horley
- Ifield Albion
- Reigatians III

Division Three South

- Ansty II
- Burwash
- Cuckfield Rangers Development
- East Sussex Warriors
- Keymer & Hassocks
- Lancing Athletic
- Montpelier Villa
- Newick
- Polegate Town II
- Sovereign Saints II

Division Four North

- East Grinstead Harriers
- FC Railway
- Forest Row III
- Forgewood
- Ifield II
- Oxted & District II
- Reigate Priory 'B'
- Reigatians IV
- Royal Earlswood

Division Four South

- AFC Varndeanians III
- Ditchling
- Hartfield
- Maresfield Village
- Marle Place Wanderers
- Plumpton Athletic
- Poets Corner
- Ringmer IV
- Scaynes Hill
- The View
- Welcroft Park Rangers II

Division Five Central

- Ashurst Wood II
- Bolnore
- Crawley Phoenix
- Crawley United II
- Cuckfield Town III
- Hurstpierpoint III
- Ifield Albion II
- Limitless Youth
- Lindfield Development
- Maresfield Village II

Division Five North

- Caterham II
- Furngate
- Gatwick Warriors II
- Horley II
- Lingfield II
- Oxted & District U23
- Reigate Priory 'C'
- Reigatians V
- Royal Earslwood II
- Warlingham II

Division Five South

- Barcombe II
- Eastbourne Albion
- Hurstpierpoint IV
- Keymer & Hassocks II
- Lindfield III
- Marle Place Wanderers II
- Sompting II
- Southwick II
- Welcroft Park Rangers III
- Willingdon Athletic II

== Recent Champions ==
Season	Premier Division	Division One	Division Two	Division Three	Division Four	Division Five	Division Six
2002–03	Lewes Bridgeview	East Grinstead United Reserves	Jarvis Brook	Maresfield Village Reserves	Lewes Rovers Reserves	Crawley Down 'A'	Lingfield 'A'
2003–04	Old Varndeanians	Jarvis Brook	Sporting Lindfield	Rotherfield	Horsted Keynes	Ardingly Reserves	Chailey
2004–05	Wisdom Sports	Willingdon Athletic	Uckfield Town Reserves	Horsted Keynes	Willingdon Athletic Reserves	A.F.C. Ringmer	Keymer & Hassocks
2005–06	East Grinstead United	Felbridge	Horsted Keynes	Willingdon Athletic Reserves	A.F.C. Ringmer	Keymer & Hassocks	Wisdom Sports Reserves
2006–07	Old Varndeanians	Hartfield	Uckfield Town Reserves	A.F.C. Ringmer	Keymer & Hassocks	Lingfield 'A'	Antsy Sports & Social
2007–08	Lindfield	Uckfield Town Reserves	A.F.C. Ringmer	Roffey	Lindfield Reserves	Danehill	Copthorne
2008–09	Old Varndeanians	Crawley Down 'A'	Roffey	Dormansland Rockets	Uckfield Town 'A'	Barcombe	East Grinstead Wanderers
2009–10	Lindfield	Roffey	Dormansland Rockets	Framfield & Blackboys United	Barcombe	Copthorne	Balcombe Reserves

Championship Division formed ahead of the 2010–11 season.

Season	Premier Division	Championship Division	Division One	Division Two	Division Three	Division Four	Division Five	Division Six
2010–11	Maresfield Village	Dormansland Rockets	AFC Grinstead	Keymer & Hassocks	Copthorne	Roffey Reserves	Fairwarp	Halsford Lions
2011–12	Dormansland Rockets	Rotherfield	Peacehaven United	Ditchling	Cuckfield Town Reserves	Wivelsfield Green	Furnace Green Galaxy Reserves	United Services
2012–13	Dormansland Rockets	Burgess Hill Albion	Smallfield	East Court	Roffey Reserves	Copthorne Reserves	DCK Copthorne	Nutley
2013–14	East Grinstead United	Smallfield	Furnace Green Rovers	Ashurst Wood	Copthorne Reserves	DCK Copthorne	Nutley	Hydraquip Reserves
2014–15	Peacehaven United	Portslade Athletic	Dormansland Rockets	Barcombe	AFC Haywards	United Services	Copthorne 'A'	DCK Copthorne
2015–16	Jarvis Brook	Dormansland Rockets	Nutley	Copthorne II	DCK Maidenbower	Eastbourne Rangers II	AFC Haywards II	Ridgewood
2016–17	Lindfield	Sporting Lindfield	Burgess Hill Albion	West Hoathly	Jarvis Brook II	Ridgewood	Burgess Hill Rhinos	Bolney Rovers
2017–18	Lindfield	Copthorne II	Charlwood	Balcombe II	Willingdon Athletic II	Chagossian & Mauritian Association	AFC Bolnore	Crawley Panthers

Lower divisions regionalised.

Season	Premier Division	Championship Division	Division One	Division Two North	Division Two South	Division Three North	Division Three South	Division Four North	Division Four South	Division Five North	Division Five South
2018–19	Cuckfield Rangers	Charlwood	Hurstpierpont	Holland Sports	Lindfield II	Galaxy	Fletching	East Grinstead Town III	Burgess Hill Albion II	Balcombe III	Horsted Keynes
2019–20	None	Sidley United	Holland Sports	Godstone	Cuckfield Town	DCK Maidenbower	Burgess Hill Albion II	Ifield Sports	Newick	Hartfield	Keymer & Hassocks

Division Five regionalised into North East, North West and South Divisions.

Season	Premier Division	Championship Division	Division One	Division Two North	Division Two South	Division Three North	Division Three South	Division Four North	Division Four South	Division Five North	Division Five South	Division Six South
2020–21	Hollington United	Southwick 1882	Buxted	Ifield Sports	Cuckfield Rangers II	Pound Hill	FC Sporting	Ifield Albion	Barcombe	Old Oxted Town	Furnace Green United	Scaynes Hill II

Season	Premier Division	Championship Division	Division One	Division Two North	Division Two South	Division Three North	Division Three South	Division Four North	Division Four South	Division Five North	Division Five South	Division Six North	Division Six South
2021–22	Sidley United	Reigate Priory	Ditchling	DCK	Ringmer A.F.C. II	Ashurst Wood II	Barcombe	Furnace Green United	Uckfield United	Holland Sports II	The View	Wakehams Green	Plumpton Athletic
2022–23	Hollington United	Oxted & District	A.F.C. Varndeanians II	Nutfield	Eastbourne Rangers II	Oxted & District II	Wivelsfield Green	Wakehams Green	Welcroft Park Rangers	Charlwood Village	Portslade Athletic II	Royal Earlswood II	Barcombe II

Season	Premier Division	Championship Division	Division One	Division Two North	Division Two South	Division Three North	Division Three South	Division Four North	Division Four South	Division Five North	Division Five South	Division Six
2023–24	Ringmer A.F.C.	Ridgewood	Reigate Priory II	Warlingham	Portslade Athletic	Charlwood Village	Ringmer A.F.C. III	Reigate Priory 'A'	Ridgewood II	East Grinstead Town III	Keymer & Hassocks	Gatwick Warriors

Division Six Removed.

Season	Premier Division	Championship Division	Division One	Division Two North	Division Two South	Division Three North	Division Three South	Division Four North	Division Four South	Division Five North	Division Five South
2024–25	Oxted & District	Lindfield II	Cuckfield Town	Forest Row II	BN Dons	AS Crawley	Eastbourne Athletic	Gatwick Warriors	Newick	Ifield Albion II	Hartfield
2025–26	Westfield	Hurstpierpoint	BN Dons	AS Crawley	Seaford Town II	Charlwood Village	BN Dons II	Horley	Hurstpierpoint II	Forgewood	Scaynes Hill Reserves

== Recent Cup winners ==
Season	MSFL Senior Charity Cup	MSFL Junior Charity Cup	Montgomery Challenge Cup	Mowatt Challenge Cup	Edgar German Challenge Cup	Stubbins Challenge Cup	Somerville Challenge Cup	Stratford Challenge Cup	Malins Challenge Cup	Parsons Challenge Cup	Tester Challenge Cup	Brian Hall Challenge Cup	Allan Washer League Challenge Trophy
2002–03	Hassocks Reserves	Virgin Reserves	Newick	Lewes Rovers	Wivelsfield Green	Lindfield Reserves	Wealden 'A'		East Court				
2003–04	Franklands Village	Rotherfield	Hassocks 'A'	Newick	Horsted Keynes	Hartfield	Horley Athletico		East Court				
2004–05	Crawley Down Reserves	Willingdon Athletic Reserves	Old Varndeanians	Uckfield Town Reserves	Hartfield	Hartfield	Willingdon Athletic Reserves						
2005–06	Ifield Edwards	Willingdon Athletic Reserves	Willingdon Athletic	Hartfield	Hartfield	AFC Ringmer	AFC Ringmer						
2006–07	Pease Pottage Village	Franklands Village	Balcombe	Ashurst Wood	Franklands Village	Keymer & Hassocks	Ansty Sports & Social						
2007–08	Three Bridges Reserves	Copthorne	Lindfield	Rotherfield	AFC Ringmer	East Grinstead Town 'A'	Barcombe						
2008–09	Lindfield	Ifield Edwards 'B'	Uckfield Town Reserves	Dormansland Rockets	Dormansland Rockets	Dormansland Rockets	Uckfield Town 'A'						
2009–10	Cowfold	Newick	Lindfield	Cuckfield Town	Burgess Hill Albion	Burgess Hill Albion	Copthorne						
2010–11	Pease Pottage Village	Maresfield Village Reserves	Lewes Bridgeview	AFC Grinstead	Peacehaven United	Plumpton Athletic	Wivelsfield Green	Copthorne II	United Services	Plumpton Athletic II	Copthorne III		Lindfield
2011–12	Pease Pottage Village	Village of Ditchling	Balcombe	Ditchling	Ditchling	Plumpton Athletic	Halsford Lions	United Services	Felbridge II	Copthorne IV	AFC Haywards		Lewes Bridgeview
2012–13	Hassocks Reserves	Sporting Elite	Peacehaven United	Lindfield Reserves	Furnace Green Rovers	Wivelsfield Green	DCK Copthorne		Framfield & Blackboys United II		Keymer & Hassocks II		Dormansland Rockets
2013–14	Balcombe	AFC Haywards	Peacehaven United	Framfield & Blackboys United	Sporting Elite	DCK Copthorne	Nutley						Peacehaven United
2014–15	Roffey	Wivelsfield Green Pilgrim	Smallfield	Dormansland Rockets	Ansty Sports & Social Club	Handcross Village	Lindfield III	Lindfield III	DCK Copthorne II	AFC Ringmer II	Cuckfield Rangers III	Cuckfield Rangers Development	Peacehaven United
2015–16	Copthorne	United Services	Lindfield	Framfield & Blackboys United	Handcross Village	Burgess Hill Albion	Montpelier Villa III	Fletching	Ridgewood	Ridgewood	East Grinstead Meads	Jarvis Brook III	Smallfield
2016–17	Lindfield	Cuckfield Town	Willingdon Athletic	Copthorne II	DCK Maidenbower	Jarvis Brook II	Jarvis Brook II	Ifield Albion	Bolney Rovers	Bolney Rovers	AFC Bolnore	Crawley Panthers	Lindfield
2017–18	(no winner)	Ansty Sports & Social	Cuckfield Rangers	West Hoathly	Hurstpierpont	Lindfield II	Burgess Hill Rhinos	AFC Ringmer II	AFC Bolnore	Crawley United	East Grinstead Town III	Ashurst Wood III	Willingdon Athletic
2018–19	Charlwood	Cuckfield Rangers II	Cuckfield Rangers	Charlwood	Hurstpierpont	AFC Hurst	Holland Sports	Forest Row II	Galaxy	Polegate Town II	Polegate Town II	Keymer & Hassocks	Cuckfield Rangers
