= 1959–60 Sussex County Football League =

Sussex County Football League
- Season: 1959–60
- Champions: Chichester City

The 1959–60 Sussex County Football League season marked the 35th in the history of the competition.

Division 1 remained at sixteen teams and Sidley United was promoted from Division 2. Division 2 was decreased to fifteen teams, as Cuckfield and Hove Town left the league but Horsham YMCA joining, from which the winner would be promoted into Division 1.

== Division One ==
The division featured 16 clubs, 15 which competed in the last season, along with one new club:

- Sidley United, promoted from last season's Division Two

=== League table ===
Division One
- Season: 1959–60
- Champions: Chichester City
- Relegated: Southwick
- Matches played: 240
- Goals scored: 989 (4.12 per match)

Pos	Team	Pld	W	D	L	GF	GA	GR	Pts	Qualification or relegation
1	Chichester City	30	23	3	4	108	44	2.455	49	
2	Rye United	30	21	2	7	74	40	1.850	44	
3	APV Athletic	30	17	6	7	79	48	1.646	40	
4	Whitehawk & Manor Farm Old Boys	30	16	5	9	72	63	1.143	37	
5	Lancing	30	13	8	9	63	53	1.189	34	
6	Bexhill Town Athletic	30	15	4	11	75	65	1.154	34	
7	Wigmore Athletic	30	13	4	13	58	56	1.036	30	
8	Newhaven	30	11	5	14	51	64	0.797	27	
9	Arundel	30	10	6	14	62	59	1.051	26	
10	Lewes	30	7	10	13	52	77	0.675	24	
11	Sidley United	30	9	6	15	51	83	0.614	24	
12	East Grinstead	30	9	5	16	51	61	0.836	23	
13	Bognor Regis Town	30	7	9	14	43	59	0.729	23	
14	Littlehampton Town	30	8	7	15	49	70	0.700	23	
15	Shoreham	30	8	5	17	53	69	0.768	21	
16	Southwick	30	8	5	17	48	78	0.615	21	Relegated to Division Two

Source: Non-League Matters
Rules for classification: 1) points; 2) goal difference; 3) number of goals scored.
The points system until the 1982–83 season: 2 points for a win, 1 point for a draw and 0 points for losing.

== Division Two ==
The division featured 15 clubs, 14 which competed in the last season, along with one new club:

- Horsham YMCA

=== League table ===
Division Two
- Season: 1959–60
- Champions: Old Varndeanians
- Promoted: Old Varndeanians
- Matches played: 210
- Goals scored: 1,055 (5.02 per match)

Pos	Team	Pld	W	D	L	GF	GA	GR	Pts	Qualification or relegation
1	Old Varndeanians	28	22	1	5	94	29	3.241	45	Promoted to Division One
2	Hastings & St Leonards	28	17	5	6	79	39	2.026	39	
3	Three Bridges United	28	18	1	9	80	50	1.600	37	
4	Seaford Town	28	18	1	9	106	71	1.493	37	
5	Battle Rangers	28	15	5	8	72	61	1.180	35	
6	Brighton Old Grammarians	28	15	4	9	79	61	1.295	34	
7	Hastings Rangers	28	13	5	10	63	72	0.875	31	
8	Uckfield Town	28	12	4	12	71	75	0.947	28	
9	Brighton North End	28	11	3	14	67	77	0.870	25	
10	Moulsecoomb Rovers	28	11	3	14	69	84	0.821	25	
11	Burgess Hill	28	8	5	15	55	67	0.821	21	
12	Horsham YMCA	28	8	4	16	54	78	0.692	20	
13	Portslade	28	8	3	17	61	100	0.610	19	
14	Hailsham	28	7	2	19	61	101	0.604	16	
15	Goldstone	28	1	6	21	44	90	0.489	8	

Source: Non-League Matters
Rules for classification: 1) points; 2) goal difference; 3) number of goals scored.
The points system until the 1982–83 season: 2 points for a win, 1 point for a draw and 0 points for losing.
