= Grenfell Athletic F.C. =

English football club

Grenfell Athletic Football Club is an amateur association football club based in London, England. They have competed in the Middlesex County Football League Premier Division.

== History ==
Grenfell Athletic was founded in 2017, in the aftermath of the Grenfell Tower fire.
