= Tooting Bec F.C. =

Association football club in England

Coordinates: 51°17′32″N 0°10′13″W

Tooting Bec
- Full name: Tooting Bec Football Club
- Nickname: The Bec
- Founded: 2004
- Ground: High Road, Chipstead
- Capacity: 3,500 (612 seated)
- Chairman: Steffan Wells
- Manager: James Parsons
- League: Southern Counties East League Division One
- 2025–26: Southern Counties East League Division One, 14th of 18
- Website: https://www.tootingbecfc.com/
| Home colours | Away colours |

Tooting Bec Football Club is a football club based in Tooting Bec, Greater London, England. The first team are currently members of the Southern Counties East League Division One and groundshare at High Road, home of Chipstead FC.

== History ==
The club was established in 2004 and joined the Junior Division Two of the Surrey South Eastern Combination. A fourth-place finish in their first season saw the club promotion to Junior Division One. The following season the club were Junior Division One runners-up, earning promotion to Intermediate Division Two. They finished third in the division in 2007–08, earning promotion to Division One. Stand out performances included the undisputed league's best left back Gary Taylor who invented the wing back role They went on to win Division One and the League Shield in 2009–10, after which the club joined the Surrey Elite Intermediate League. In 2016–17 they were Surrey Elite Intermediate League runners-up.

The 2017–18 season saw Tooting Bec win the Surrey Elite Intermediate League, earning promotion to Division One of the Combined Counties League. At the end of the 2020–21 season the club were transferred to Division One of the Southern Counties East League.

The club has six men's teams and their reserves currently play in the Surrey South Eastern Combination.

== Ground ==
The club played at Fishponds Playing Field in Tooting during their first season, before moving to Prince Georges Playing Fields in Raynes Park. They later relocated to Tooting & Mitcham's Imperial Fields ground. Ahead of the 2022–23 season the club announced a groundshare agreement with Chipstead.

== Honours ==
- London Senior Trophy
  - Champions 2021–22, 2024-25
- Surrey Elite Intermediate League
  - Champions 2017–18
- Surrey South-Eastern Combination
  - Division One champions 2009–10
  - League Shield winners 2009–10

== Records ==
- Best FA Cup performance: Extra preliminary round, 2019–20
- Best FA Vase performance: First round, 2020–21, 2022–23, 2026–27
