= 1960–61 Sussex County Football League =

Sussex County Football League
- Season: 1960–61
- Champions: Chichester City

The 1960–61 Sussex County Football League season was the 36th in the history of the competition.

Division 1 remained at sixteen teams and Old Varndeanians was promoted from Division 2. Division 2 was increased to sixteen teams again, as LEC Sports joined, from which the winner would be promoted into Division 1.

== Division One ==
The division featured 16 clubs, 15 which competed in the last season, along with one new club:

- Old Varndeanians, promoted from last season's Division Two

Whitehawk & Manor Farm Old Boys changed name to Whitehawk.

=== League table ===
Division One
- Season: 1960–61
- Champions: Chichester City
- Relegated: Shoreham
- Matches played: 240
- Goals scored: 1,121 (4.67 per match)

Pos	Team	Pld	W	D	L	GF	GA	GR	Pts	Qualification or relegation
1	Chichester City	30	23	3	4	126	51	2.471	49	
2	APV Athletic	30	22	2	6	114	49	2.327	46	
3	Lewes	30	16	9	5	86	55	1.564	41	
4	Rye United	30	18	4	8	82	47	1.745	40	
5	Arundel	30	15	5	10	73	55	1.327	35	
6	Bognor Regis Town	30	14	6	10	76	57	1.333	34	
7	Littlehampton Town	30	12	4	14	70	86	0.814	28	
8	Sidley United	30	10	6	14	51	80	0.638	26	
9	Old Varndeanians	30	9	7	14	49	64	0.766	25	
10	East Grinstead	30	9	7	14	45	59	0.763	25	
11	Wigmore Athletic	30	8	8	14	64	76	0.842	24	
12	Lancing	30	10	4	16	59	82	0.720	24	
13	Bexhill Town Athletic	30	9	4	17	61	85	0.718	22	
14	Whitehawk	30	8	5	17	65	76	0.855	21	
15	Newhaven	30	7	6	17	50	96	0.521	20	
16	Shoreham	30	8	4	18	50	103	0.485	20	Relegated to Division Two

Source: Non-League Matters
Rules for classification: 1) points; 2) goal difference; 3) number of goals scored.
The points system until the 1982–83 season: 2 points for a win, 1 point for a draw and 0 points for losing.

== Division Two ==
The division featured 16 clubs, 14 which competed in the last season, along with two new clubs:

- Southwick, relegated from last season's Division One
- LEC Sports

=== League table ===
Division Two
- Season: 1960–61
- Champions: Hastings Rangers
- Promoted: Hastings Rangers
- Matches played: 240
- Goals scored: 1,239 (5.16 per match)

Pos	Team	Pld	W	D	L	GF	GA	GR	Pts	Qualification or relegation
1	Hastings Rangers	30	25	4	1	113	31	3.645	54	Promoted to Division One
2	LEC Sports	30	21	4	5	104	51	2.039	46	Left the league
3	Southwick	30	19	6	5	90	43	2.093	44	
4	Uckfield Town	30	18	6	6	83	56	1.482	42	
5	Seaford Town	30	14	4	12	97	79	1.228	32	
6	Battle Rangers	30	13	5	12	92	80	1.150	31	
7	Three Bridges United	30	11	6	13	78	78	1.000	28	
8	Brighton Old Grammarians	30	12	4	14	74	79	0.937	28	
9	Hastings & St Leonards	30	12	4	14	79	85	0.929	28	
10	Brighton North End	30	11	5	14	90	87	1.034	27	
11	Burgess Hill	30	9	8	13	57	75	0.760	26	
12	Goldstone	30	10	3	17	60	79	0.759	23	
13	Horsham YMCA	30	9	3	18	57	104	0.548	21	
14	Portslade	30	6	6	18	63	98	0.643	18	
15	Hailsham	30	7	3	20	54	103	0.524	17	
16	Moulsecoomb Rovers	30	5	5	20	48	111	0.432	15	

Source: Non-League Matters
Rules for classification: 1) points; 2) goal difference; 3) number of goals scored.
The points system until the 1982–83 season: 2 points for a win, 1 point for a draw and 0 points for losing.
