= King's Academy Ringmer =

King’s Academy Ringmer

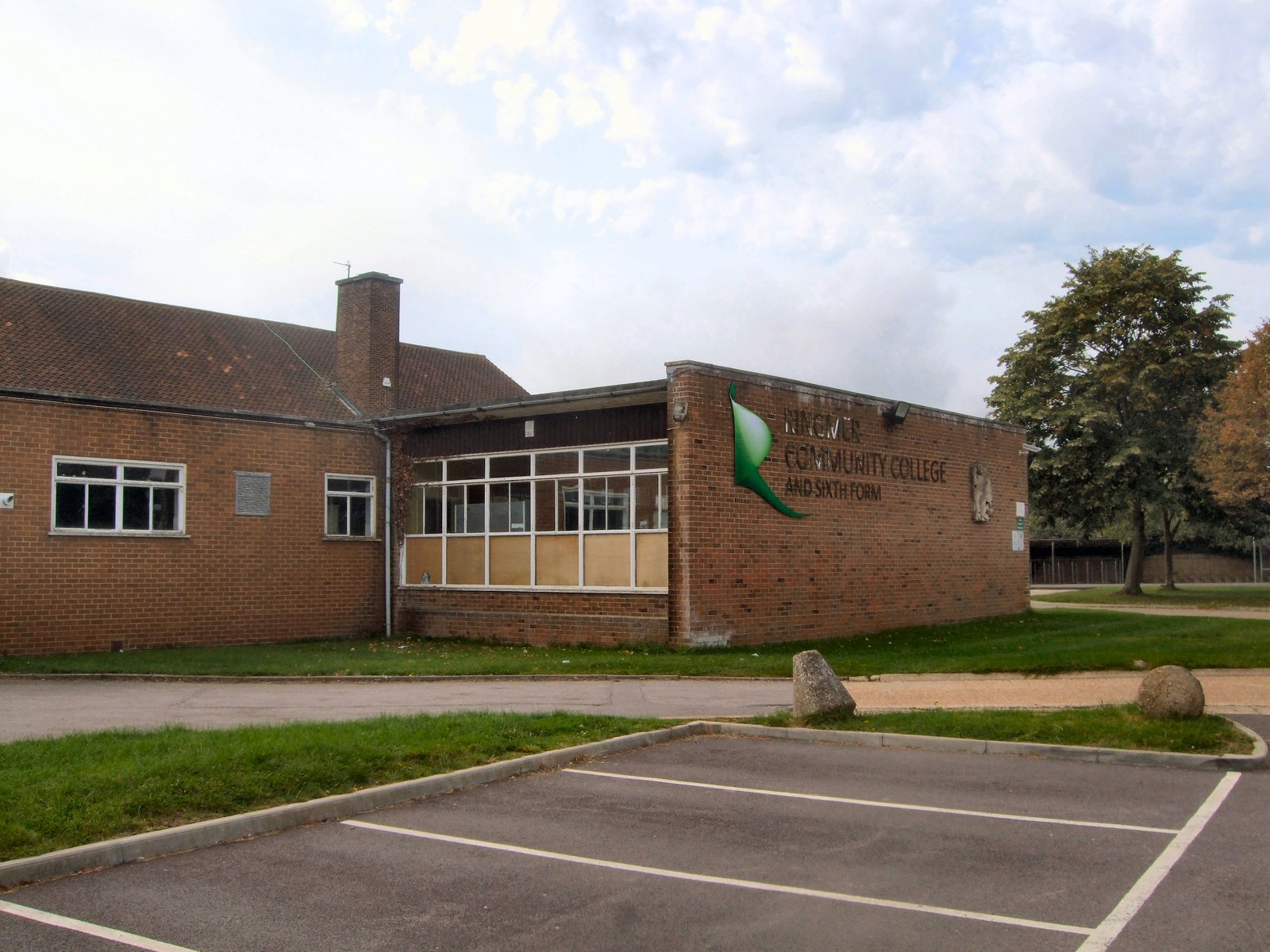

Location
- Lewes Road; Lewes, East Sussex, BN8 5RB; England; 50°53′44″N 0°04′02″E

Information
- Other names: Ringmer County Secondary School
- Former names: Ringmer Academy; Ringmer Community College
- Type: Academy
- Motto: "In pursuit of excellence"
- Established: 1958
- Local authority: East Sussex
- Category: Academy
- Trust: King's Group Academies.
- Specialist: Technology
- Department for Education URN: 144505 Tables
- Ofsted: Reports
- Chair of Governors: Denise Kong
- Principal: Chris Harvey
- Gender: Co-educational
- Age: 11 to 16
- Enrollment: 652 (as of 2024)
- Website: www.kgaringmer.uk

King's Academy Ringmer is an academy school and a specialist technology college. It is located in the village of Ringmer, East Sussex, England. The school was opened in 1958 and serves a catchment area of Lewes and surrounding towns and villages.

The academy is part of a multi-academy trust entitled King's Group Academies. Its most recent Ofsted report was published in June 2019. The report rated the academy as good overall, with outstanding leadership and management.

== History ==
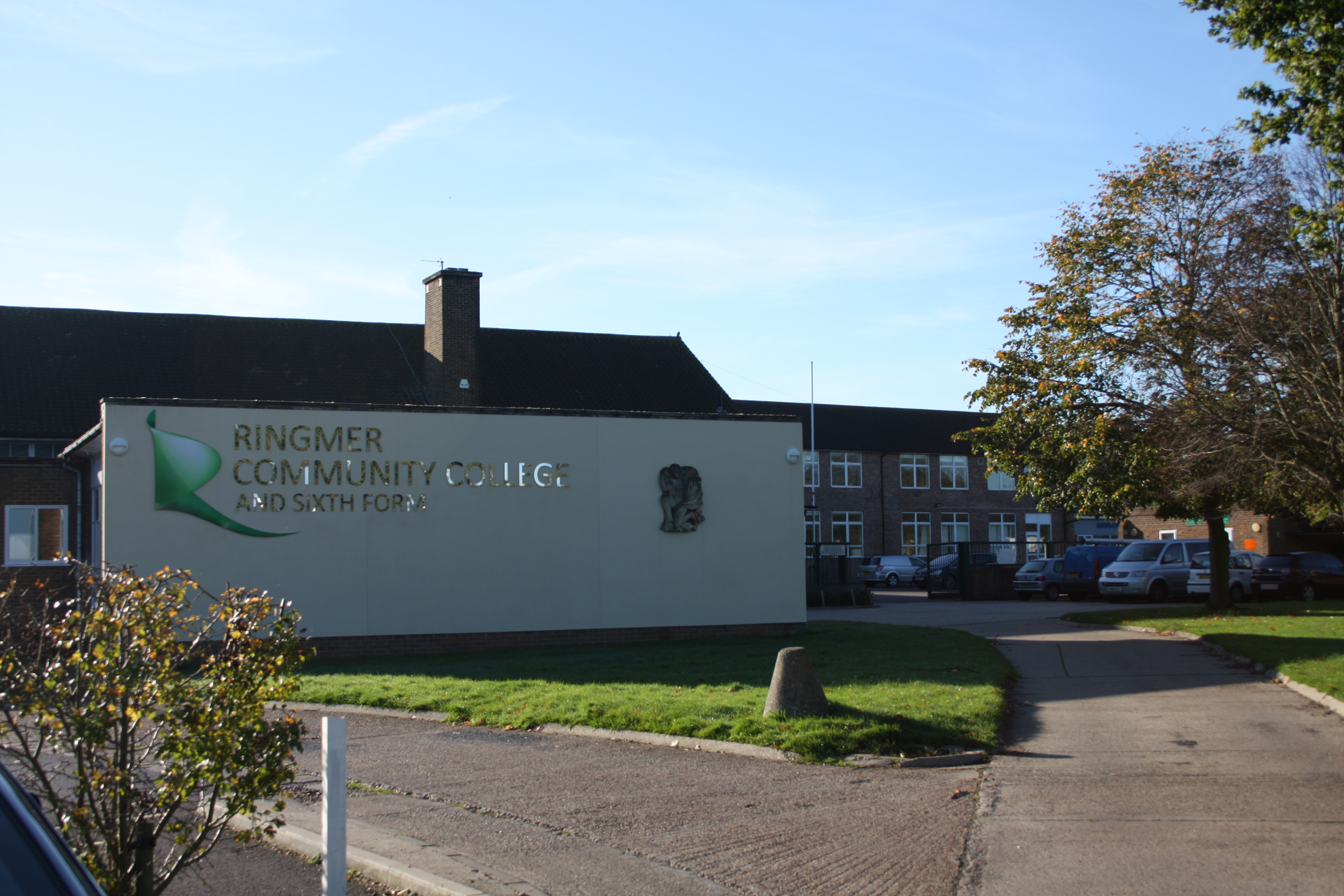
A school building

Ringmer Secondary School opened in 1958, serving the local area and surrounding towns and villages.

Ringmer County Secondary School gained recognition for its work with the community, including evening classes for adults. The school also gained recognition for its brass band.

The original school building received a Civic Trust Award for its design. The library was built in 1973 as the number of pupils rose as a result of the school leaving age being raised to 16.

The secondary school became a Community College when the former prime minister Lord Callaghan formally opened the school.

The original school building consisted of:

- Clark Block, now closed.
- Swimming pool, built in 1981.
- The Music department, which had to be extended, housing studio and recording rooms.
- A major building phase in 1988 improved Humanities and Science facilities, within a two-story building, which were improved again in 2000 with the Specialist Technology College status.

In 2005 the John Wakely Building was constructed, which housed Modern Foreign Languages until 2008 when the department moved over to the Clarke Building, resulting in the English department moving into the Wakely building. The building was named after the former Headmaster John Wakely (1983–1998).

In 2008 the school re-branded with a new logo and uniform, and from September 2008 the college name was changed to "Ringmer Community College and Sixth Form" as a new sixth form had been built.

On 1 August 2011, the school officially gained academy status.

The school joined KGA in 2016; in 2019 the academy was rated as 'Good', with Outstanding Leadership and Management.

== Sixth form ==
The Sixth Form was open from 2008 to 2016. It offered A Levels and vocational courses.

== Notable former pupils ==
- Natasha Kaplinsky, newsreader, TV presenter and journalist
- Rag'n'Bone Man, singer and songwriter
- Solly March, Premier League Footballer for Brighton and Hove Albion
