= Ringmer =

Village and parish in East Sussex, England

Coordinates: 50°53′N 0°03′E

- Village and civil parish
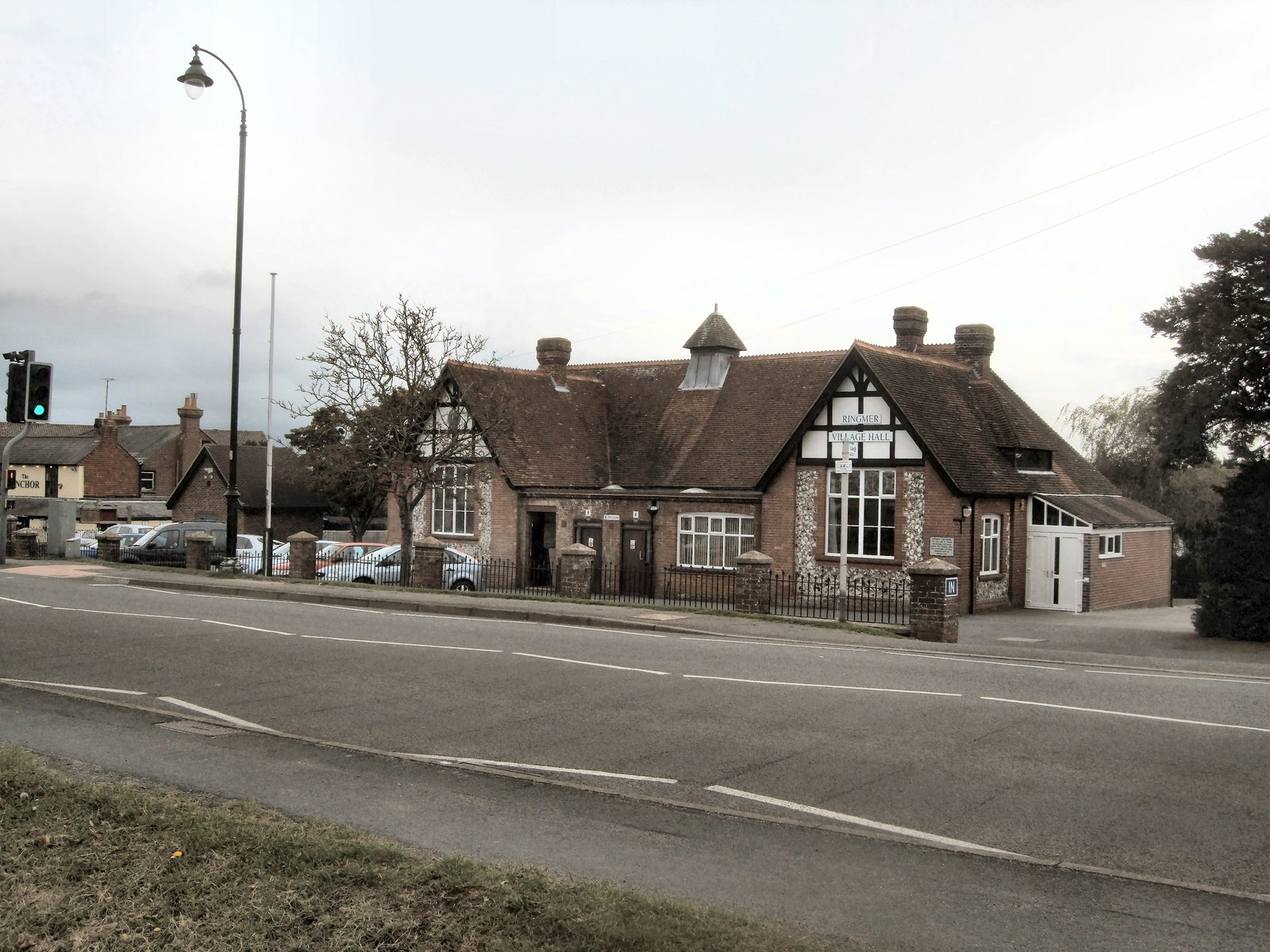

- Location within East Sussex
- Area: 25.9 km^{2} (10.0 sq mi)
- Population: 4,648 (Parish-2011)
  - Density: 459/sq mi (177/km^{2})
- OS grid reference: TQ445124
  - London: 43 miles (69 km) N
- District: Lewes
- Shire county: East Sussex
- Region: South East
- Country: England
- Sovereign state: United Kingdom
- Post town: LEWES
- Postcode district: BN8
- Dialling code: 01273
- Police: Sussex
- Fire: East Sussex
- Ambulance: South East Coast
- UK Parliament: Lewes
- Website: Parish Council website

Ringmer is a village and civil parish in the Lewes District of East Sussex, England. The village is 3 miles (4.8 km) east of Lewes. Other small settlements in the parish include Upper Wellingham, Ashton Green, Broyle Side, Norlington, Little Norlington and Shortgate.

The name Ringmer originates from Ryngemere meaning 'circular pool'.

== Description ==
Ringmer is one of the largest villages in Southern England. There has been human habitation since at least Roman times. The parish church, dedicated to St Mary, was probably built in the 13th century. One of its rectors, named to the living in 1533, was William Levett, named in the same year as rector of Buxted, and one of the most improbable figures in English ecclesiastical history.

Ringmer has two schools, Ringmer Primary School for ages 4–11 and King's Academy (formerly Ringmer Community College) for students aged 11–18.

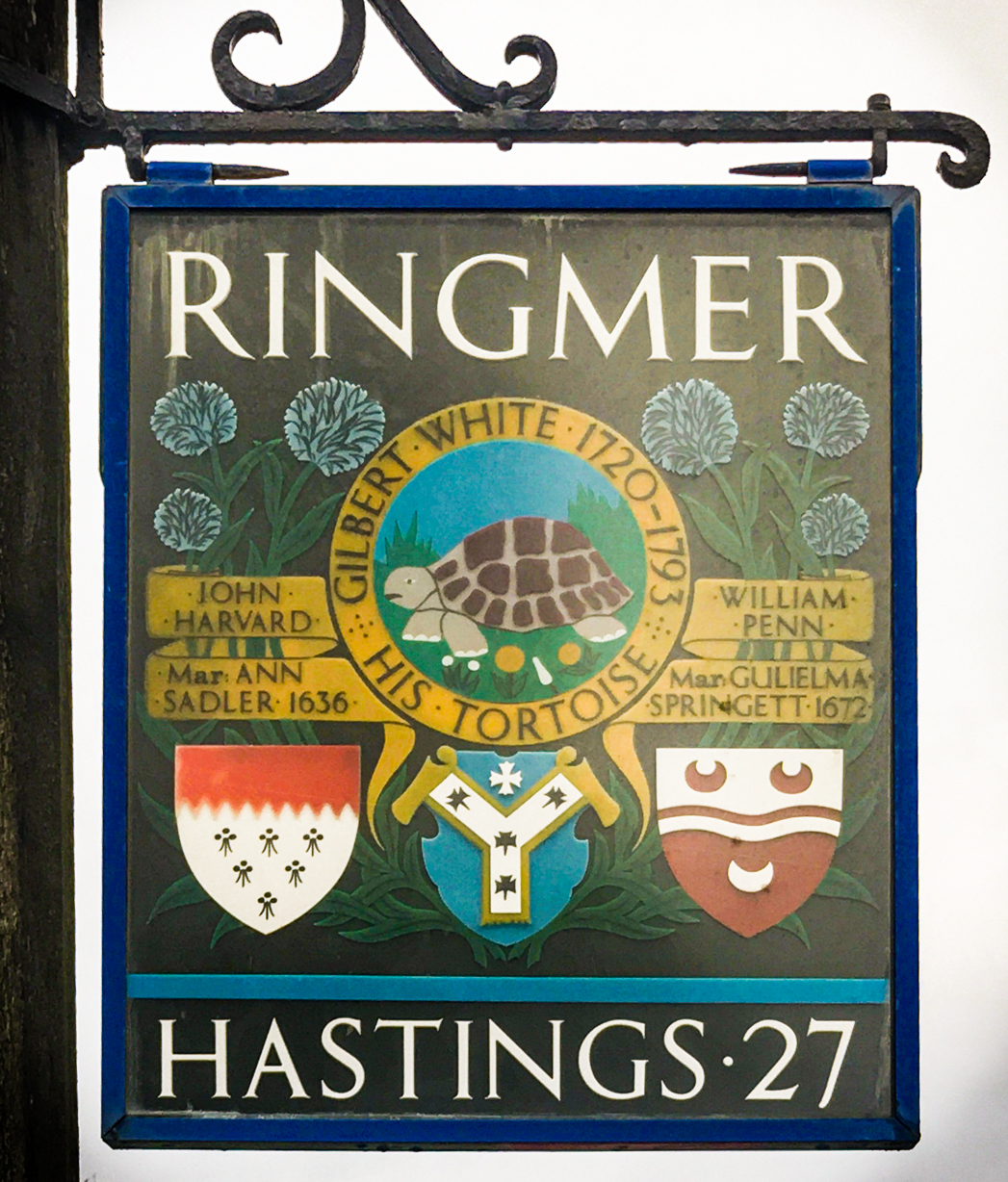
Ringmer village sign (south face)

The symbol of Ringmer is a tortoise named Timothy, after the female tortoise that the naturalist Gilbert White carried back to Selborne in Hampshire in 1780. White’s aunt Rebecca Snooke lived in Delves House where Timothy had the run of the courtyard garden. Timothy died in 1794, a year after White.

== Governance ==
Ringmer is part of the Lewes District Council electoral ward of Ouse Valley and Ringmer. The population of this ward at the 2011 census was 6,422. It is in the Ringmer and Lewes Bridge Division of East Sussex County Council.

The UK Parliament constituency for Ringmer is Lewes. The Liberal Democrat Norman Baker served as the constituency MP from 1997 until 2015, when Conservative Maria Caulfield was elected. As of July 2024 Liberal Democrat James MacCleary is the MP.

Prior to Brexit in 2020, Ringmer was part of the South East England constituency in the European Parliament.

== Landmarks ==
Ringmer Mill stood for centuries on Mill Plain overlooking Ringmer. This post mill was in operation until 1921 but collapsed in 1925 leaving the mill post, on which the body of the mill rotated, standing as a local landmark.

Plashett Park Wood is a Site of Special Scientific Interest partly in the parish. It is a site of biological importance as an area of ancient woodland. Plashett Wood and the adjoining Plashett Park Farm provide habitats for a wide variety of breeding birds and bats, and a number of rarer invertebrates and flora.

== Sport and leisure ==
Ringmer has a Non-League football club, AFC Ringmer, which played at The Caburn ground until 2020; from season 2020/21 games are played at a new ground behind King's Academy.

== Notable residents ==
- James Callaghan, British Prime Minister, and his wife Audrey Callaghan bought Upper Clayhill Farm, Ringmer, in 1967. They moved there permanently after Callaghan's election defeat in 1979; Audrey moved into a care home in 2001, but James lived there until his death in March 2005, 11 days after the death of his wife.
- H. Dormer Legge, RAF and Army officer and philatelist, born in Ringmer
- John Harvard, after whom Harvard University is named, married in 1636 Ann Sadler, daughter of the Rev John Sadler, Vicar of Ringmer 1626–1640
- Wendy James, lead singer of Transvision Vamp and later Racine
- Gideon Mantell, pioneer geologist & palaeontologist, was a Lewes surgeon who held contracts to serve the poor of Ringmer and the Royal Horse Artillery hospital at Ringmer barracks
- Frederick Parris, cricketer and test match umpire
- William Penn, founder of Pennsylvania, married Gulielma Springett, a member of the Springett family of Broyle Place, Ringmer.

== 2006 fireworks factory fire ==
The mushroom cloud from the fire at the factory

On 3 December 2006 the Festival Fireworks factory, which is in the parish near Shortgate, caught fire detonating the display pyrotechnics stored on the site. Successive explosions then followed for more than eight hours. Sussex Police, which described it as "a serious incident", established a 200 metres (660 ft) exclusion zone around the factory. Television pictures showed a large fireball at the centre of the blaze. Two members of Sussex fire services died and nine fire service workers were injured, along with two members of the public and two police officers. Hundreds of rockets continued to explode more than five hours after the initial blasts.
