= Cuckfield Town F.C. =

Association football club in England

Cuckfield Town
- Full name: Cuckfield Town Football Club
- Nickname: The Whitebellies
- Founded: 1872; 154 years ago
- Ground: Cuckfield Recreation Ground, Cuckfield
- League: Mid-Sussex League Championship
- 2025–26: Mid-Sussex League Championship, 3rd of 10
Home colours

Cuckfield Town is a football club based in Cuckfield, West Sussex, England that currently plays in the Mid-Sussex League Championship.

== History ==
In 1872 they were formed by Mr. Wyndham Burrell and Mr. G.T. Bunting. Their home ground was Cuckfield Park and they played in red & black hooped shirts and cricket trousers. The usually played against the colleges of Sussex. The first game they ever played that was reported was against Brighton Rangers in 1880. It ended 4–0 to Brighton Rangers. In 1889 they formed their second team.

In 1900 they were founder members of the Mid Sussex League along with Burgess Hill, Haywards Heath and East Grinstead & Hurstpierpoint. They also changed their playing kit to white shirts and blue socks. In 1905 the club moved to Ockenden Park and in 1911 made their first appearance in the Montgomery Cup Final. During the First World War they lost 16 players.

In 1922 they made it to their second Montgomery Cup Final which almost 2000 spectators witnessed. In 1925 the club moved to Cuckfield Recreation Park where they still are today. Three years later the club folded for one season due to lack of interest. Their 50th anniversary was celebrated by them winning the Division Two title and the Mowatt Cup.

In 1946 their first league championship was secured and a year later they won the Montgomery Cup at the seventh attempt. The trophy's continued in 1950 when they won the league and the Montgomery Cup. In 1952 the joined the Sussex County League Division Three. The same year their third team was founded. Two years later the broke association with the Mid Sussex League by entering a reserve side in the Brighton & District League but five years later had to rejoin because of financial reasons.

In 1963 their record appearance maker Dave Farrell made his début. He would go on to make 904 appearances for the club. In 1964, 1973 and 1974 they won league and Montgomery Cup doubles. In 1976 the reserves finished second in Division 1 but could not be promoted because the first team were in the Premier Division. Two years later their run of intermediate level football ended with relegation to Division 1.

In 1984 they got promoted up to the Premier Division as champions of Division 1. In 1987 they won a Montgomery cup clash with St. Francis Hospital. After 1-1 and 0-0 draws, Cuckfield won the cup with a single goal from Leigh Fanner.

In 1990 Cuckfield equalled the record of Ardingly & West Hoathly with their sixth championship. In 1991 they won a record eighth Montgomery Cup. The same year the third team was revived. The next year, in 1992, Christian Macrae broke a 60-year record by scoring in 15 consecutive games also in that year John White reached 600 first teams appearances. Shortly after Cuckfield Town played Brighton & Hove Albion's first team to celebrate their 125th anniversary. They got a commemorative certificate from the English F.A. In 1996 Steve Eason scored 76 times in 26 matches for the third team which is a club record. Three years later Cuckfield won their ninth Montgomery Cup and record goalscorer Ray Leaney reached his 500th goal Mid Sussex football.

In 2007 the first team got relegated to Division Two which was the club's lowest position since the 1930s. In 2010 after three seasons restructuring the club from top to bottom the first team completed their climb back to the Premier Division, picking up a Mowatt Cup win on the way. In 2013 they beat Peacehaven United 4–3 on penalties to win the Allan Washer Trophy, followed by a 3–0 win over AFC Haywards II in 2017 to win the Mid Sussex Junior Charity Cup. In 2017, another big change occurred, with a new committee and a new management team taking charge of the 1st XI. After a season finishing in 3rd place by one point and with large numbers signed on, the reserve side was re-instated; the reserves entered into the new format of Mid Sussex Division 4 North.

The 1st XI were on course to win Division 2 North in the 2019–20 season, but unfortunately were unable to officially be crowned champions due to the COVID-19 pandemic. They were promoted to Division 1 after finishing top of the league on a points-per-game basis.

== Honours ==
Mid Sussex Football League

- Premier Division Winners 1973–74, 1989–90, Runners Up 1987–88, 2012-13
- Division One Winners 1945–46, 1964–65, 1972–73, 1983–84, Runners Up 1920–21, 1946–47, 1947–48, 1948–49, 1962–63, 1970–71, 2009–10
- Division Two Winners 1907–08, 1926–27, 1932–33, 1939–40, Runners Up 1906–07, 1919–20, 2008–09
- Division Three Winners 1930-31, 2011-12
- Division Seven Runners Up 2004–05
- Division Eight Winners 2010-11

Mowatt Cup

- Winners 1932, 2009–10

Stubbins Cup

- Runners Up 2006–07

Montgomery Cup

- Winners 1947, 1950, 1965, 1973, 1974, 1987, 1998, 1999, Runners Up 1912, 1922, 1923, 1935, 1936, 1940, 1979

Sussex Junior Charity Cup

- Winners 2017
