= 2018–19 Eastern Counties Football League =

The 2018–19 season was the 76th season in the history of Eastern Counties Football League, a football competition in England. The season saw Division One divided into two sections.

Histon were champions, winning their second Eastern Counties Football League title and returned to the Isthmian League after two years in the Eastern Counties League.

== Premier Division ==
Eastern Counties Football League Premier Division
- Season: 2018–19
- Champions: Histon
- Promoted: Histon
- Relegated: Framlingham Town; Great Yarmouth Town
- Matches: 380
- Goals: 1,313 (3.46 per match)

The Premier Division featured 16 clubs which competed in the division last season, along with four new clubs:

- Framlingham Town, promoted from Division One
- Norwich United, relegated from the Isthmian League
- Whitton United, promoted from Division One
- Woodbridge Town, promoted from Division One

=== League table ===
Pos	Team	Pld	W	D	L	GF	GA	GD	Pts	Promotion or relegation
1	Histon	38	30	5	3	91	34	+57	95	Promoted to the Isthmian League
2	Woodbridge Town	38	26	3	9	103	51	+52	81	
3	Godmanchester Rovers	38	21	10	7	89	56	+33	73	
4	Stowmarket Town	38	20	11	7	81	40	+41	71	
5	Kirkley & Pakefield	38	19	9	10	65	55	+10	66	
6	FC Clacton	38	19	6	13	76	74	+2	63	
7	Wroxham	38	19	5	14	70	54	+16	62	
8	Brantham Athletic	38	17	8	13	56	47	+9	59	
9	Walsham-le-Willows	38	17	6	15	67	60	+7	57	
10	Newmarket Town	38	15	6	17	73	70	+3	51	
11	Norwich United	38	14	8	16	59	53	+6	50	
12	Haverhill Rovers	38	14	7	17	53	63	−10	49	
13	Whitton United	38	13	5	20	53	66	−13	44	
14	Thetford Town	38	13	4	21	62	76	−14	43	
15	Gorleston	38	12	5	21	62	82	−20	41	
16	Hadleigh United	38	12	4	22	64	92	−28	40	
17	Long Melford	38	10	9	19	45	78	−33	39	
18	Ely City	38	11	5	22	52	84	−32	38	
19	Great Yarmouth Town	38	10	4	24	45	80	−35	34	Relegated to Division One North
20	Framlingham Town	38	6	4	28	47	98	−51	22	Relegated to Division One North

Source: FA Full-Time
Rules for classification: 1) Points; 2) Goal difference; 3) Number of goals scored; 4) Number of matches won; 5) Head-to-head results

=== Stadia and locations ===
Locations of the Premier Division clubs

Team	Stadium	Capacity
Brantham Athletic	Brantham Leisure Centre	1,200
Ely City	Unwin Sports Ground	1,500
Clacton	The Rush Green Bowl	3,000
Framlingham Town	Badingham Road	
Godmanchester Rovers	Bearscroft Lane	1,050
Gorleston	Emerald Park	3,000
Great Yarmouth Town	Wellesley Recreation Ground	3,600
Hadleigh United	Millfield	3,000
Haverhill Rovers	New Croft	3,000
Histon	Bridge Road	4,300
Kirkley & Pakefield	Walmer Road	2,000
Long Melford	Stoneylands	
Newmarket Town	Cricket Field Road	2,750
Norwich United	Plantation Park	3,000
Stowmarket Town	Greens Meadow	1,000
Thetford Town	Mundford Road	1,500
Walsham-le-Willows	Summer Road	1,000
Whitton United	King George V Playing Fields	1,000
Woodbridge Town	Notcutts Park	3,000
Wroxham	Trafford Park	2,000

== Division One North ==
Eastern Counties Football League Division One North
- Season: 2018–19
- Champions: Swaffham Town
- Promoted: Swaffham Town
- Matches: 342
- Goals: 1,404 (4.11 per match)

It was the first season Division One was split into two sections. Division One North featured 12 clubs which competed in Division One last season, along with seven new clubs.

- Clubs relegated or demoted from the Premier Division:
  - Fakenham Town
  - Haverhill Borough
  - Ipswich Wanderers
- Clubs promoted from the Anglian Combination:
  - Harleston Town
  - Mulbarton Wanderers
- Plus:
  - Felixstowe & Walton United reserves, joined from the Reserve Division
  - Lakenheath, promoted from the Cambridgeshire County League

=== League table ===
Pos	Team	Pld	W	D	L	GF	GA	GD	Pts	Promotion or relegation
1	Swaffham Town	36	27	4	5	105	36	+69	85	Promoted to the Premier Division
2	Harleston Town	36	27	3	6	123	44	+79	84	Demoted to the Anglian Combination (Note: Harleston Town were demoted due to ground grading issues. An appeal by the club against this decision was unsuccessful.)
3	Mulbarton Wanderers	36	23	5	8	84	42	+42	74	
4	March Town United	36	21	9	6	89	48	+41	72	
5	Lakenheath	36	22	4	10	104	53	+51	70	
6	Fakenham Town	36	21	7	8	72	49	+23	70	
7	Norwich CBS	36	20	7	9	92	54	+38	67	
8	Downham Town	36	18	6	12	64	58	+6	60	
9	Leiston reserves	36	14	3	19	77	93	−16	45	
10	Ipswich Wanderers	36	13	4	19	64	77	−13	43	
11	Debenham LC	36	12	7	17	45	61	−16	43	
12	Cornard United	36	11	9	16	68	82	−14	42	
13	AFC Sudbury reserves	36	11	6	19	73	81	−8	39	
14	King's Lynn Town reserves	36	11	5	20	65	96	−31	38	
15	Diss Town	36	11	4	21	50	67	−17	37	
16	Haverhill Borough	36	10	3	23	75	103	−28	33	
17	Needham Market reserves	36	9	6	21	62	94	−32	33	
18	Wisbech St Mary	36	8	1	27	49	131	−82	25	Reprieved from relegation (Note: Wisbech St Mary and Felixstowe & Walton United Reserves were granted a reprieve from relegation.)
19	Felixstowe & Walton United reserves	36	6	1	29	43	135	−92	19	Reprieved from relegation

Source: FA Full-Time
Rules for classification: 1) Points; 2) Goal difference; 3) Number of goals scored; 4) Number of matches won; 5) Head-to-head results

=== Stadia and locations ===
Locations of Division One North clubs

Team	Stadium	Capacity
AFC Sudbury reserves	King's Marsh	2,500
Cornard United	Blackhouse Lane	2,000
Debenham LC	Maitlands	1,000
Diss Town	Brewers Green Lane	2,500
Downham Town	Memorial Field	1,000
Fakenham Town	Clipbush Park	2,000
Felixstowe & Walton United reserves	Dellwood Avenue	2,000
Harleston Town	The Recreation Ground	
Haverhill Borough	New Croft (artificial, groundshare with Haverhill Rovers)	3,000
Ipswich Wanderers	Humber Doucy Lane	1,000
King's Lynn Town reserves	The Walks	5,733
Lakenheath	The Nest	
Leiston reserves	Victory Road	2,500
March Town United	The GER Sports Ground	
Mulbarton Wanderers	The Common	
Needham Market reserves	Bloomfields	4,000
Norwich CBS	FDC Bowthorpe	
Swaffham Town	Shoemakers Lane	
Wisbech St Mary	Beechings Close	

== Division One South ==
Eastern Counties Football League Division One South
- Season: 2018–19
- Champions: Hashtag United
- Promoted: Hashtag United
- Matches: 342
- Goals: 1,280 (3.74 per match)

It was the first season Division One was split into two sections. Division One South featured four clubs which competed in Division One last season, along with 15 new clubs.

- Clubs relegated from the Essex Senior League:
  - Burnham Ramblers
  - Hackney Wick
- Clubs joined from the Essex Olympian League:
  - Benfleet
  - Frenford
  - May & Baker
  - Newbury Forest
  - White Ensign
- Clubs joined from the Essex and Suffolk Border League:
  - Brightlingsea Regent reserves
  - Coggeshall United
  - Harwich & Parkeston
- Plus:
  - Fire United, joined from the Middlesex County League
  - Hashtag United, new club
  - Lopes Tavares, joined from the Essex Alliance League
  - Wivenhoe Town, relegated from the Premier Division
  - Wormley Rovers, joined from the Hertfordshire Senior County League

=== League table ===
Pos	Team	Pld	W	D	L	GF	GA	GD	Pts	Promotion or relegation
1	Hashtag United	36	26	6	4	85	29	+56	84	Promoted to Essex Senior League
2	Coggeshall United	36	24	5	7	100	39	+61	77	
3	Halstead Town	36	24	4	8	92	52	+40	76	
4	White Ensign	36	22	5	9	87	53	+34	71	
5	Harwich & Parkeston	36	22	5	9	87	57	+30	71	
6	Hackney Wick	36	19	10	7	61	37	+24	67	
7	Little Oakley	36	19	7	10	73	63	+10	64	
8	May & Baker	36	18	4	14	70	64	+6	58	
9	Frenford	36	16	8	12	73	57	+16	56	
10	Wormley Rovers	36	15	7	14	70	50	+20	52	
11	Holland	36	16	3	17	67	68	−1	51	
12	Benfleet	36	14	7	15	75	63	+12	49	
13	Burnham Ramblers	36	13	6	17	66	81	−15	45	
14	Wivenhoe Town	36	10	7	19	48	82	−34	37	
15	Braintree Town reserves	36	6	10	20	41	87	−46	28	Resigned from the league
16	Lopes Tavares	36	6	8	22	52	89	−37	26	
17	Newbury Forest	36	5	7	24	46	93	−47	22	
18	Brightlingsea Regent reserves	36	5	5	26	53	97	−44	20	Reprieved from relegation (Note: Brightlingsea Regent Reserves and Fire United were granted a reprieve from relegation.)
19	Fire United	36	4	2	30	34	119	−85	14	Reprieved from relegation

Source: FA Full-Time
Rules for classification: 1) Points; 2) Goal difference; 3) Number of goals scored; 4) Number of matches won; 5) Head-to-head results

=== Stadia and locations ===
Locations of Division One South clubs
Greater London Premier Division football clubs

Team	Stadium	Capacity
Benfleet	Park Lane (groundshare with Canvey Island)	4,100
Braintree Town reserves	Cressing Road	4,202
Brightlingsea Regent reserves	North Road	1,000
Burnham Ramblers	Leslie Fields	2,000
Coggeshall United	West Street (groundshare with Coggeshall Town)	2,000
Fire United	Terence MacMillan Stadium (groundshare with Lopes Tavares)	
Frenford	Jack Carter Centre	
Hackney Wick	The Old Spotted Dog Ground (groundshare with Clapton)	
Halstead Town	Rosemary Lane	1,000
Harwich & Parkeston	Royal Oak	
Hashtag United	Coles Park (groundshare with Haringey Borough)	2,500
Holland	Dulwich Road	
Little Oakley	Memorial Ground	
Lopes Tavares	Terence MacMillan Stadium (groundshare with Fire United)	
May & Baker	Gale Street (groundshare with Barking RFC)	1,000
Newbury Forest	Oakside (groundshare with Redbridge)	3,000
White Ensign	Basildon Sports Village	
Wivenhoe Town	Broad Lane	2,876
Wormley Rovers	Wormley Playing Fields	
