= 2020–21 Eastern Counties Football League =

The 2020–21 season was the 78th season in the history of the Eastern Counties Football League, a football competition in England. Teams were divided into three divisions, the Premier Division at Step 5, and the geographically separated Division One North and Division One South, both at Step 6 of the English football league system.

The allocations for Steps 5 and 6 for season 2020–21 were announced by the FA on 21 July, and were subject to appeal.

The 2020–21 season started in September and was suspended in December a result of the COVID-19 pandemic. The league season was subsequently abandoned.

== Promotions, relegation and restructure ==
The scheduled restructure of non-League took place at the end of the season, with new divisions added to the Combined Counties and the United Counties League at step 5 for 2021–22, along with new a division in the Northern Premier League at step 4. Promotions from steps 5 to 4 and 6 to 5 were based on points per game across all matches over the two cancelled seasons (2019–20 and 2020–21), while teams were promoted to step 6 on the basis of a subjective application process.

== Premier Division ==
Eastern Counties Football League Premier Division
- Season: 2020–21
- Promoted: Stowmarket Town
- Matches: 105
- Goals: 350 (3.33 per match)

The Premier Division comprised the same set of 20 teams which competed in the aborted competition the previous season.

=== League table ===
Pos	Team	Pld	W	D	L	GF	GA	GD	Pts	Promotion or qualification
1	Wroxham	10	10	0	0	28	8	+20	30	
2	Norwich United	11	9	2	0	24	9	+15	29	
3	Brantham Athletic	11	6	4	1	21	13	+8	22	
4	Walsham-le-Willows	12	6	3	3	30	21	+9	21	
5	Ely City	12	5	5	2	12	8	+4	20	
6	Kirkley & Pakefield	11	6	1	4	21	23	−2	19	
7	Stanway Rovers	12	4	4	4	25	17	+8	16	Transferred to the Essex Senior League
8	Hadleigh United	11	4	4	3	16	14	+2	16	
9	Mildenhall Town	8	4	3	1	19	10	+9	15	
10	FC Clacton	10	4	3	3	22	16	+6	15	Transferred to the Essex Senior League
11	Stowmarket Town	7	4	3	0	10	5	+5	15	Promoted to the Isthmian League (Note: Promoted based on points per game calculations from 2019–20 and 2020–21 seasons combined.)
12	Gorleston	10	5	0	5	16	20	−4	15	
13	Newmarket Town	10	3	1	6	16	22	−6	10	
14	Swaffham Town	13	3	1	9	16	27	−11	10	
15	Whitton United	9	3	0	6	17	22	−5	9	
16	Godmanchester Rovers	12	2	3	7	14	22	−8	9	Transferred to the United Counties League
17	Woodbridge Town	11	2	2	7	16	22	−6	8	
18	Haverhill Rovers	11	2	1	8	9	28	−19	7	
19	Long Melford	8	1	2	5	12	19	−7	5	
20	Thetford Town	11	1	0	10	6	24	−18	3	

Source: FA Full-Time
Rules for classification: 1) Points; 2) Goal difference; 3) Number of goals scored; 4) Number of matches won; 5) Head-to-head results

=== Stadia and locations ===
Locations of the Premier Division clubs

Team	Stadium	Capacity
Brantham Athletic	Brantham Leisure Centre	1,200
Ely City	Unwin Sports Ground	1,500
Clacton	The Rush Green Bowl	3,000
Godmanchester Rovers	Bearscroft Lane	1,050
Gorleston	Emerald Park	3,000
Hadleigh United	Millfield	3,000
Haverhill Rovers	New Croft	3,000
Kirkley & Pakefield	Walmer Road	2,000
Long Melford	Stoneylands	
Mildenhall Town	Recreation Way	2,000
Newmarket Town	Cricket Field Road	2,750
Norwich United	Plantation Park	3,000
Stanway Rovers	Hawthorns	1,500
Stowmarket Town	Greens Meadow	1,000
Swaffham Town	Shoemakers Lane	
Thetford Town	Mundford Road	1,500
Walsham-le-Willows	Summer Road	1,000
Whitton United	King George V Playing Fields	1,000
Woodbridge Town	Notcutts Park	3,000
Wroxham	Trafford Park	2,000

== Division One North ==
Eastern Counties Football League Division One North
- Season: 2020–21
- Promoted: Fakenham Town; March Town United; Lakenheath; Mulbarton Wanderers
- Matches: 106
- Goals: 453 (4.27 per match)

Division One North comprised 19 teams, one less than in the previous season, following the resignation of Felixstowe & Walton United reserves.

=== League table ===
Pos	Team	Pld	W	D	L	GF	GA	GD	Pts	Promotion or qualification
1	Fakenham Town	11	9	2	0	34	8	+26	29	Promoted to the Premier Division (Note: Promoted based on points per game calculations from 2019–20 and 2020–21 seasons combined.)
2	Ipswich Wanderers	10	9	1	0	33	9	+24	28	Transferred to Division One South
3	March Town United	11	9	0	2	32	11	+21	27	Promoted to the Premier Division
4	Lakenheath	10	7	1	2	30	12	+18	22	Promoted to the Premier Division
5	Sheringham	13	6	3	4	32	26	+6	21	
6	Leiston reserves	10	7	0	3	22	20	+2	21	
7	Great Yarmouth Town	13	6	1	6	25	27	−2	19	
8	Mulbarton Wanderers	10	5	3	2	27	7	+20	18	Promoted to the Premier Division
9	Downham Town	11	6	0	5	24	19	+5	18	
10	Diss Town	12	4	3	5	27	27	0	15	
11	Framlingham Town	11	4	1	6	26	29	−3	13	
12	Needham Market reserves	12	4	1	7	24	34	−10	13	
13	King's Lynn Town reserves	11	4	0	7	28	32	−4	12	Resigned from the league
14	Cornard United	12	3	2	7	20	28	−8	11	Transferred to Division One South
15	AFC Sudbury reserves	10	3	2	5	15	27	−12	11	Transferred to Division One South
16	Debenham LC	10	3	1	6	12	21	−9	10	
17	Norwich CBS	10	1	6	3	19	18	+1	9	
18	Haverhill Borough	11	1	1	9	7	27	−20	4	Transferred to Division One South
19	Wisbech St Mary	14	1	0	13	16	71	−55	3	

Source: FA Full-Time
Rules for classification: 1) Points; 2) Goal difference; 3) Number of goals scored; 4) Number of matches won; 5) Head-to-head results

=== Stadia and locations ===
Locations of Division One North clubs

Team	Stadium	Capacity
AFC Sudbury reserves	King's Marsh	2,500
Cornard United	Blackhouse Lane	2,000
Debenham LC	Maitlands	1,000
Diss Town	Brewers Green Lane	2,500
Downham Town	Memorial Field	1,000
Fakenham Town	Clipbush Park	2,000
Framlingham Town	Badingham Road	
Great Yarmouth Town	Wellesley Recreation Ground	3,600
Haverhill Borough	New Croft (artificial, groundshare with Haverhill Rovers)	3,000
Ipswich Wanderers	Humber Doucy Lane	1,000
King's Lynn Town reserves	The Walks	5,733
Lakenheath	The Nest	
Leiston reserves	Victory Road	2,500
March Town United	The GER Sports Ground	
Mulbarton Wanderers	The Common	
Needham Market reserves	Bloomfields	4,000
Norwich CBS	FDC Bowthorpe	
Sheringham	Weybourne Road	
Wisbech St Mary	Beechings Close	

== Division One South ==
Eastern Counties Football League Division One South
- Season: 2020–21
- Promoted: Athletic Newham; Little Oakley; White Ensign
- Matches: 84
- Goals: 301 (3.58 per match)

Division One South featured 16 clubs which competed in the division last season, along with one new club:

- Brimsdown, transferred from the Spartan South Midlands League

In addition, Hackney Wick were relocated to the Spartan South Midlands League, but this relocation was reversed. On 27 August 2020, Lopes Tavares announced the renaming of the club to Athletic Newham.

=== League table ===
Pos	Team	Pld	W	D	L	GF	GA	GD	Pts	Promotion
1	Newbury Forest	10	7	1	2	21	16	+5	22	
2	Athletic Newham	12	5	6	1	20	13	+7	21	Promoted to the Essex Senior League (Note: Promoted based on points per game calculations from 2019–20 and 2020–21 seasons combined.)
3	White Ensign	10	6	2	2	22	14	+8	20	Promoted to the Essex Senior League
4	Wivenhoe Town	11	6	1	4	20	14	+6	19	
5	Little Oakley	8	6	0	2	23	12	+11	18	Promoted to the Essex Senior League
6	Frenford	11	5	2	4	22	14	+8	17	
7	Wormley Rovers	10	5	2	3	17	14	+3	17	
8	Benfleet	10	5	2	3	25	26	−1	17	
9	Coggeshall United	11	4	3	4	14	14	0	15	
10	Barkingside	9	4	1	4	12	12	0	13	
11	Hackney Wick	14	3	4	7	23	30	−7	13	
12	Burnham Ramblers	10	3	2	5	18	21	−3	11	
13	Halstead Town	9	2	3	4	21	17	+4	9	
14	Holland	7	1	3	3	8	12	−4	6	
15	Harwich & Parkeston	11	0	5	6	10	20	−10	5	
16	Brimsdown	10	1	2	7	17	40	−23	5	
17	May & Baker	5	1	1	3	8	12	−4	4	

Source: FA Full-Time
Rules for classification: 1) Points; 2) Goal difference; 3) Number of goals scored; 4) Number of matches won; 5) Head-to-head results

=== Stadia and locations ===
Locations of Division One South clubs
Greater London Division One South football clubs

Team	Stadium	Capacity
Athletic Newham	Terence MacMillan Stadium	
Barkingside	Cricklefield Stadium (groundshare with Ilford)	3,500
Benfleet	Park Lane (groundshare with Canvey Island)	4,100
Brimsdown	Chadfields (groundshare with Tilbury)	4,000
Burnham Ramblers	Leslie Fields	2,000
Coggeshall United	West Street (groundshare with Coggeshall Town)	
Frenford	Jack Carter Centre	
Hackney Wick	Spa Road (groundshare with Witham Town)	2,500
Halstead Town	Rosemary Lane	1,000
Harwich & Parkeston	Royal Oak	
Holland	Dulwich Road	
Little Oakley	Memorial Ground	
May & Baker	Parkside Stadium (groundshare with Aveley)	3,500
Newbury Forest	Oakside (groundshare with Redbridge)	3,000
White Ensign	Basildon Sports Village	
Wivenhoe Town	Broad Lane	2,876
Wormley Rovers	Wormley Playing Fields	
