= 2021–22 Eastern Counties Football League =

The 2021–22 season was the 79th season in the history of the Eastern Counties Football League, a football competition in England. Teams are divided into three divisions, the Premier Division at Step 5, and the geographically separated Division One North and Division One South, both at Step 6 of the English football league system.

The allocations for Steps 5 and 6 this season were announced by the Football Association and published on the league's website on 18 May 2021, subject to appeals. The league constitution was published on 27 June. After the abandonment of the 2019–20 and 2020–21 seasons due to the COVID-19 pandemic in England, numerous promotions were decided on a points per game basis over the previous two seasons.

Gorleston were champions, winning their first Eastern Counties Football League title and were promoted to the Isthmian League for the first time in their history. Wroxham finished second and returned to the Isthmian League after five years as one of ten runners-up from Step 5 with the most points per game.

== Premier Division ==
Eastern Counties Football League Premier Division
- Season: 2021–22
- Champions: Gorleston
- Promoted: Gorleston; Wroxham
- Relegated: Swaffham Town
- Matches: 380
- Goals: 1,220 (3.21 per match)

The Premier Division featured 16 clubs which competed in the division last season, along with four new clubs, promoted from Division One North:

- Fakenham Town
- Lakenheath
- March Town United
- Mulbarton Wanderers

=== League table ===
Pos	Team	Pld	W	D	L	GF	GA	GD	Pts	Promotion, qualification or relegation
1	Gorleston	38	26	6	6	87	36	+51	84	Promoted to the Isthmian League (Note: Wroxham were automatically promoted as one of ten runners-up from Step 5 with the most points per game (PPG).)
2	Wroxham	38	26	5	7	104	28	+76	83	Promoted to the Isthmian League
3	Mildenhall Town	38	21	7	10	79	42	+37	70	
4	Mulbarton Wanderers	38	20	8	10	67	48	+19	68	
5	Norwich United	38	20	7	11	62	45	+17	67	
6	Fakenham Town	38	19	6	13	68	56	+12	63	
7	Walsham-le-Willows	38	18	7	13	63	47	+16	61	
8	Newmarket Town	38	18	6	14	71	59	+12	60	
9	Kirkley & Pakefield	38	17	8	13	63	48	+15	59	
10	March Town United	38	17	6	15	72	63	+9	57	Transferred to the United Counties League
11	Woodbridge Town	38	15	9	14	64	63	+1	54	
12	Lakenheath	38	13	11	14	63	56	+7	50	
13	Ely City	38	12	9	17	60	77	−17	45	
14	Thetford Town	38	12	8	18	61	60	+1	44	
15	Hadleigh United	38	11	10	17	46	62	−16	43	
16	Whitton United	38	10	8	20	46	94	−48	38	
17	Haverhill Rovers	38	10	6	22	46	71	−25	36	
18	Brantham Athletic	38	9	9	20	32	63	−31	36	
19	Long Melford	38	6	14	18	46	70	−24	32	Reprieved from relegation (Note: Reprieved as one of twelve clubs with the most PPG out of 16 that were second-from-bottom in Step 5.)
20	Swaffham Town	38	3	4	31	20	132	−112	13	Relegated to Division One North

Source: The FA Full-Time
Rules for classification: 1) Points; 2) Goal difference; 3) Number of goals scored; 4) Number of matches won; 5) Head-to-head results

=== Stadia and locations ===
Locations of the Premier Division clubs

Team	Stadium	Capacity
Brantham Athletic	Brantham Leisure Centre	1,200
Ely City	Unwin Sports Ground	1,500
Fakenham Town	Clipbush Park	2,000
Gorleston	Emerald Park	3,000
Hadleigh United	Millfield	3,000
Haverhill Rovers	New Croft	3,000
Kirkley & Pakefield	Walmer Road	2,000
Lakenheath	The Nest	
Long Melford	Stoneylands	
March Town United	The GER Sports Ground	
Mildenhall Town	Recreation Way	2,000
Mulbarton Wanderers	The Common	
Newmarket Town	Cricket Field Road	2,750
Norwich United	Plantation Park	3,000
Swaffham Town	Shoemakers Lane	
Thetford Town	Mundford Road	1,500
Walsham-le-Willows	Summer Road	1,000
Whitton United	King George V Playing Fields	1,000
Woodbridge Town	Notcutts Park	3,000
Wroxham	Trafford Park	2,000

== Division One North ==
Eastern Counties Football League Division One North
- Season: 2021–22
- Champions: Sheringham
- Promoted: Harleston Town; Sheringham
- Relegated: Peterborough North End Sports; Wisbech St Mary
- Matches: 240
- Goals: 826 (3.44 per match)

Division One North featured ten clubs which competed in the previous season, along with six new clubs.

- Clubs, promoted from the Anglian Combination:
  - Harleston Town
  - University of East Anglia
- Promoted from the Peterborough and District League:
  - FC Parson Drove
  - Peterborough North End Sports
- Transferred from the United Counties League:
  - Huntingdon Town
  - Whittlesey Athletic

Also, Blackstones and Bourne Town were initially moved to this division from the United Counties League but they successfully appealed and their transfers were rescinded.

=== League table ===
Pos	Team	Pld	W	D	L	GF	GA	GD	Pts	Promotion, qualification or relegation
1	Sheringham	30	24	3	3	84	28	+56	75	Promoted to the Premier Division
2	Harleston Town	30	23	4	3	77	23	+54	73	Qualified for the play-offs, then promoted to the Premier Division
3	Downham Town	30	18	9	3	56	26	+30	63	Qualified for the play-offs
4	Norwich CBS	30	16	4	10	68	48	+20	52	Qualified for the play-offs
5	Framlingham Town	30	15	4	11	56	43	+13	49	Qualified for the play-offs
6	Whittlesey Athletic	30	12	9	9	60	52	+8	45	
7	Huntingdon Town	30	11	9	10	48	49	−1	42	
8	Peterborough North End Sports	30	10	8	12	50	50	0	38	Resigned from the league (Note: Peterborough North End Sports requested a voluntary relegation to the Peterborough and District League at the end of the season. They were placed bottom for relegation purposes.)
9	Leiston reserves	30	9	9	12	49	54	−5	36	
10	Great Yarmouth Town	30	9	9	12	43	51	−8	36	
11	Debenham LC	30	10	6	14	50	64	−14	36	
12	University of East Anglia	30	10	5	15	41	40	+1	35	Resigned from the league
13	Diss Town	30	8	6	16	46	56	−10	30	
14	Needham Market reserves	30	8	5	17	54	71	−17	29	
15	FC Parson Drove	30	7	7	16	28	62	−34	28	Reprieved from relegation (Note: All third-from-bottom clubs at Step 6 were reprieved from relegation. The top 15 second-from-bottom sides were also reprieved on a PPG basis.)
16	Wisbech St Mary	30	0	3	27	16	109	−93	3	Relegated to the Cambridgeshire County League

Source: The FA Full-Time
Rules for classification: 1) Points; 2) Goal difference; 3) Number of goals scored; 4) Number of matches won; 5) Head-to-head results

=== Play-offs ===
Semifinals
2	Harleston Town	2
5	Framlingham Town	1
3	Downham Town	1
4	Norwich CBS	0

Final
2	Harleston Town	3
3	Downham Town	1

==== Semifinals ====
23 April 2022	Harleston Town	2–1	Framlingham Town	Harleston
		Report		Stadium: Wilderness Lane; Attendance: 206

23 April 2022	Downham Town	1–0	Norwich CBS	Downham Market
		Report		Stadium: Memorial Field; Attendance: 122

==== Final ====
30 April 2022	Harleston Town	3–1	Downham Town	Harleston
		Report		Stadium: Wilderness Lane; Attendance: 250

=== Stadia and locations ===
Locations of Division One North clubs

Team	Stadium	Capacity
Debenham LC	Maitlands	1,000
Diss Town	Brewers Green Lane	2,500
Downham Town	Memorial Field	1,000
FC Parson Drove	Main Road	
Framlingham Town	Badingham Road	
Great Yarmouth Town	Wellesley Recreation Ground	3,600
Harleston Town	Wilderness Lane	
Huntingdon Town	Jubilee Park	
Leiston reserves	Victory Road	2,500
Needham Market reserves	Bloomfields	4,000
Norwich CBS	FDC Bowthorpe	
Peterborough North End Sports	Lincoln Road (groundshare with Peterborough Sports)	2,300
Sheringham	Weybourne Road	
University of East Anglia	Aldiss Park (groundshare with Dereham Town)	2,500
Whittlesey Athletic	Feldale Field	
Wisbech St Mary	Beechings Close	

== Division One South ==
Eastern Counties Football League Division One South
- Season: 2021–22
- Champions: Ipswich Wanderers
- Promoted: Ipswich Wanderers; Halstead Town; Buckhurst Hill
- Relegated: Brimsdown
- Matches: 380
- Goals: 1,473 (3.88 per match)

Division One South featured 14 clubs which competed in the division last season, along with six new clubs:

- Clubs, transferred from Division One North:
  - AFC Sudbury reserves
  - Cornard United
  - Haverhill Borough
  - Ipswich Wanderers
- Plus:
  - Buckhurst Hill, promoted from the Essex Olympian League
  - Park View, transferred from the Spartan South Midlands League

=== League table ===
Pos	Team	Pld	W	D	L	GF	GA	GD	Pts	Promotion, qualification or relegation
1	Ipswich Wanderers	38	33	4	1	127	19	+108	103	Promoted to the Premier Division
2	Buckhurst Hill	38	31	5	2	144	29	+115	98	Qualified for the play-offs, then promoted to the Essex Senior League (Note: Losing play-off finalists Buckhurst Hill promoted to fill a vacancy made by Brislington's voluntary relegation from the Western League Premier Division.)
3	Benfleet	38	23	5	10	74	48	+26	74	Qualified for the play-offs
4	Halstead Town	38	23	2	13	99	72	+27	71	Qualified for the play-offs, then promoted to the Essex Senior League
5	Wivenhoe Town	38	21	7	10	83	59	+24	70	Qualified for the play-offs
6	Burnham Ramblers	38	21	5	12	91	66	+25	68	
7	Wormley Rovers	38	17	7	14	70	75	−5	58	
8	Holland	38	17	6	15	72	73	−1	57	Transferred to Division One North
9	Frenford	38	14	9	15	80	77	+3	51	
10	May & Baker	38	12	13	13	60	60	0	49	
11	Barkingside	38	15	4	19	55	76	−21	49	
12	Hackney Wick	38	11	11	16	65	72	−7	44	
13	Harwich & Parkeston	38	11	11	16	53	61	−8	44	Transferred to Division One North
14	AFC Sudbury reserves	38	13	5	20	74	103	−29	44	Transferred to Division One North
15	Coggeshall United	38	12	7	19	51	67	−16	43	
16	Newbury Forest	38	12	2	24	70	104	−34	38	
17	Park View	38	10	6	22	65	103	−38	36	
18	Cornard United	38	10	5	23	52	93	−41	35	Reprieved from relegation, then transferred to Division One North (Note: All third-from-bottom clubs at Step 6 were reprieved from relegation. The top 15 second-from-bottom sides were also reprieved on a PPG basis.)
19	Haverhill Borough	38	6	7	25	43	98	−55	25	Reprieved from relegation, then transferred to Division One North
20	Brimsdown	38	4	7	27	45	118	−73	19	Relegated to the Spartan South Midlands League

Source: The FA Full-Time
Rules for classification: 1) Points; 2) Goal difference; 3) Number of goals scored; 4) Number of matches won; 5) Head-to-head results

=== Play-offs ===
Semifinals
2	Buckhurst Hill	3
5	Wivenhoe Town	2
3	Benfleet	1
4	Halstead Town (a.e.t.)	2

Final
2	Buckhurst Hill	1
4	Halstead Town	2

==== Semifinals ====
23 April 2022	Buckhurst Hill	3–2	Wivenhoe Town	Buckhurst Hill
				Stadium: Roding Lane; Attendance: 296

23 April 2022	Benfleet	1–2 (a.e.t.)	Halstead Town	Canvey Island
	Harris 90+2'		Poku 24'; Palmer 92'	Stadium: Park Lane; Attendance: 162; Referee: Chris Darling

==== Final ====
30 April 2022	Buckhurst Hill	1–2	Halstead Town	Buckhurst Hill
	Zuhdu 22'		Schelvis 3'; Poku 25'	Stadium: Roding Lane; Attendance: TBC; Referee: Dario Matthewson

=== Stadia and locations ===
Locations of Division One South clubs
Greater London Division One South football clubs

Team	Stadium	Capacity
AFC Sudbury reserves	King's Marsh	2,500
Barkingside	Cricklefield Stadium (groundshare with Ilford)	3,500
Benfleet	Park Lane (groundshare with Canvey Island)	4,100
Brimsdown	Chadfields (groundshare with Tilbury)	4,000
Buckhurst Hill	Roding Lane	
Burnham Ramblers	Leslie Fields	2,000
Coggeshall United	West Street (groundshare with Coggeshall Town)	
Cornard United	Blackhouse Lane	
Frenford	The Jack Carter Centre	2,000
Hackney Wick	Spa Road (groundshare with Witham Town)	2,500
Halstead Town	Rosemary Lane	
Harwich & Parkeston	Royal Oak	
Haverhill Borough	New Croft (groundshare with Haverhill Rovers)	3,000
Holland	Dulwich Road	
Ipswich Wanderers	Humber Doucy Lane	
May & Baker	Parkside Stadium (groundshare with Aveley)	3,500
Newbury Forest	Oakside Stadium (groundshare with Redbridge)	3,000
Park View	New River Stadium	5,000
Wivenhoe Town	Broad Lane	2,876
Wormley Rovers	Wormley Playing Fields	500
