= 2026–27 FA Cup qualifying rounds =

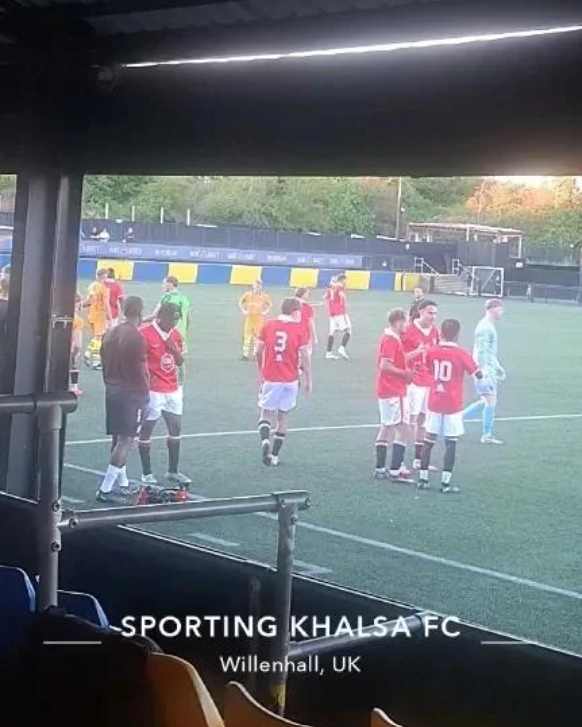
- Dudley Town 0–2 Droitwich Spa, Extra preliminary round, 7 August 2026

Tournament details
- Country: England; Guernsey; Jersey; Wales
- Dates: 7 August – 17 October 2026
- Teams: 651

The 2026–27 FA Cup qualifying rounds opened the 146th edition of the FA Cup, the world's oldest association football single knockout competition, organised by The Football Association, the governing body for the sport in England. 651 teams in the 5th to 9th tier of English football competed across six rounds for 32 spots in the 2026–27 FA Cup first round proper.

== Eligibility ==
The qualifying rounds were the point of entry into the FA Cup for all "non-League" teams—teams below the top four tiers of English football, and therefore outside the English Football League (EFL). These teams competed in leagues below the EFL which constitute the National League System. The number of teams entered in the FA Cup overall was 743, a drop from 747 teams in 2025–26.

== Calendar ==
Round	Main date	Leagues entering this round	New entries this round	Winners from the previous round	Number of fixtures	Prize fund	
Round	Main date	Leagues entering this round	New entries this round	Winners from the previous round	Number of fixtures	Losing club	Winning club
Extra preliminary round	8 August 2026	Level 9 Level 8 (32 newly promoted clubs and 91 lowest ranked clubs by points per game from 25/26)	438	None	219	£375	£1,125
Preliminary round	22 August 2026	Level 8 (Remaining clubs)	53	219	136	£481	£1,444
First qualifying round	5 September 2026	Level 7	88	136	112	£750	£2,250
Second qualifying round	19 September 2026	National League North; National League South	48	112	80	£1,125	£3,375
Third qualifying round	3 October 2026	None	0	80	40	£1,875	£5,625
Fourth qualifying round	17 October 2026	National League	24	40	32	£3,125	£9,375

== Extra preliminary round ==
Number of non-league teams per tier still in qualifying
National League (Note: National League teams joined in the fourth round of qualifying.)	North/South (Note: National League North/South teams joined in the second round of qualifying.)	Premier Division (Note: Premier Division teams joined in the first round of qualifying.)	Division One	Regional	Total
24 / 24	48 / 48	88 / 88	176 / 176	315 / 315	651 / 651

The draw for the extra preliminary round was made on 3 July 2026.

Tie	Home team (Tier) (Note: (9) represents teams allocated to divisions at the 9th tier of English football (otherwise known as Step 5 of the National League System). (8) represents the 8th tier (Step 4 NLS).)	Score	Away team (Tier)	Att.
Friday 7 August 2026
37	Sheffield (9)	0–2	Parkgate (9)	705
129	Thornbury Town (9)	0–1	Brislington (9)	219
51	Lye Town (9)	3–0	Stone Old Alleynians (9)	138
54	Romulus (9)	2–1	Highgate United (9)	140
Match played at Sutton Coldfield Town
59	Dudley Town (9)	0–2	Droitwich Spa (9)	229
92	Thetford Town (9)	1–1	Yaxley (9)	250
111	Hilltop (9)	1–5	Grays Athletic (8)	187
118	White Ensign (9)	1–0	Heybridge Swifts (9)	199
124	Hackney Wick (9)	0–1	West Essex (9)	75
Match played at Clapton
125	Enfield (9)	2–0	Welwyn Garden City (8)	275
Match played at Harlow Town
134	Hartpury (8)	0–2	Cirencester Town (9)	195
Match played at Cirencester Town
135	Cribbs (9)	1–2	Fairford Town (9)	120
136	Aylesbury United (8)	A–A (Note: Match abandoned, with the score at 0–1, at half time due to persistent issues with the floodlights.)	Flackwell Heath (8)	N/A
Match played at Beaconsfield Town
147	Wokingham Town (9)	2–0	Corsham Town (9)	353
163	Kingstonian (8)	4–1	Hastings United (8)	293
Match played at Ashford Town (Middlesex)
179	Forest Row (9)	0–2	Newhaven (9)	
188	Faversham Strike Force (9)	0–1	Snodland Town (9)	257
58	Hinckley (9)	1–2	Whitchurch Alport (9)	326
Match played at Heather St John's
141	Ascot United (8)	3–2	Clevedon Town (9)	202
Saturday 8 August 2026
19	Horbury Town (9)	1–1	Golcar United (9)	195
70	Deeping Rangers (9)	3–7	Barton Town (9)	169
158	Guernsey (9)	0–5	Crowborough Athletic (8)	325
178	Bognor Regis Town (8)	3–0	Abbey Rangers (9)	458
1	Yarm & Eaglescliffe (9)	2–2	West Auckland Town (8)	224
2	Carlisle City (9)	2–0	Northallerton Town (9)	95
3	Consett (8)	1–1	North Shields (9)	356
4	Whitley Bay (9)	3–3	Easington Colliery (9)	407
5	Birtley Town (9)	2–3	Bishop Auckland (9)	369
6	Penrith (9)	1–2	Bridlington Town (8)	159
7	Shildon (9)	4–1	Blyth Town (9)	210
8	Ashington (8)	2–0	Horden Community Welfare (9)	464
9	Marske United (9)	W/O (Note: Marske United awarded a walkover due to Boro Rangers withdrawing from the competition.)	Boro Rangers (9)	–
10	Newcastle Benfield (9)	0–2	Redcar Town (9)	153
11	Guisborough Town (8)	0–1	Thornaby (9)	460
12	Crook Town (9)	4–0	Pickering Town (9)	226
13	Newton Aycliffe (9)	0–1	Kendal Town (9)	224
14	Knaresborough Town (9)	2–1	Whickham (9)	137
15	Blyth Spartans (8)	2–0	Newcastle Blue Star (9)	1,080
16	Euxton Villa (9)	6–0	Atherton Laburnum Rovers (9)	
17	1874 Northwich (8)	3–0	Rossington Main (9)	335
18	Liversedge (8)	4–1	Penistone Church (9)	236
20	Frickley Athletic (9)	1–1	Campion (9)	145
21	Garforth Town (8)	1–1	West Didsbury & Chorlton (9)	385
22	Wythenshawe (8)	2–0	Padiham (8)	288
23	Abbey Hey (9)	1–1	Ossett United (8)	224
25	Litherland REMYCA (9)	2–1	Charnock Richard (9)	153
26	Thackley (9)	2–1	Albion Sports (9)	385
27	Clitheroe (8)	5–0	AFC Liverpool (9)	455
28	Chadderton (9)	0–2	Witton Albion (8)	264
29	North Ferriby (8)	2–2	FC St Helens (9)	385
30	Wythenshawe Town (9)	0–2	Cheadle Town (9)	220
32	Silsden (8)	3–3	Mossley (8)	234
33	Ramsbottom United (9)	2–4	South Liverpool (9)	293
34	Nelson (9)	3–2	Stockport Georgians (9)	186
35	Handsworth (9)	0–2	Prestwich Heys (9)	154
36	Runcorn Town (9)	2–2	Dearne & District (9)	175
39	Barnoldswick Town (9)	2–2	Atherton Collieries (8)	232
40	Tadcaster Albion (9)	1–1	Glossop North End (9)	178
41	Burscough (9)	2–2	Droylsden (9)	325
42	Keighley Town (9)	0–1	Longridge Town (9)	263
43	Stourport Swifts (9)	1–2	Hanley Town (8)	118
44	Pershore Town (9)	3–1	Brocton (9)	136
45	Rugby Borough (8)	3–0	Sporting Club Inkberrow (8)	121
46	Westfields (9)	2–5	Nuneaton Town (8)	242
47	Stafford Rangers (8)	5–0	Tividale (9)	882
48	Gresley Rovers (9)	0–3	Boldmere St. Michaels (8)	319
49	Winsford United (9)	0–2	Mickleover (8)	319
50	Shifnal Town (8)	2–1	Clay Cross Town (9)	241
52	Sutton United (Birmingham) (9)	4–3	Coventry Sphinx (9)	304
53	Congleton Town (8)	2–3	AFC Wolverhampton City (9)	522
55	Newcastle Town (8)	2–1	Atherstone Town (9)	161
56	Sutton Coldfield Town (8)	1–3	Coventry United (8)	226
57	Worcester Raiders (8)	0–0	Ashby Ivanhoe (9)	115
60	Chasetown (8)	6–1	Coton Green (9)	376
61	Knowle (9)	2–1	Darlaston Town (1874) (9)	207
62	Belper United (9)	1–2	Bedworth United (8)	75
63	Lutterworth Town (9)	0–0	Hereford Pegasus (9)	70
64	Sporting Khalsa (9)	1–1	Nantwich Town (8)	122
65	Rugby Town (9)	2–0	Uttoxeter Town (9)	269
66	Kidsgrove Athletic (8)	0–0	Abbey Hulton United (9)	415
67	Blackstones (9)	0–1	Northampton Sileby Rangers (9)	130
68	Daventry Town (9)	1–2	Boston Town (8)	123
69	Kimberley Miners Welfare (9)	0–5	AFC Rushden & Diamonds (8)	177
Match played at Hucknall Town
71	Newark Town (9)	0–4	Wellingborough Town (8)	157
72	Grimsby Borough (8)	0–3	Bourne Town (8)	
73	AFC Mansfield (9)	1–0	Retford United (9)	120
74	Skegness Town (9)	0–2	Retford (9)	194
75	Leicester Nirvana (9)	1–2	Long Eaton United (8)	96
76	Bottesford Town (9)	6–3	Aylestone Park (9)	130
78	Grantham Town (8)	0–2	Lincoln United (8)	403
79	Corby Town (8)	7–1	FC Peterborough (9)	388
80	Loughborough Students (8)	1–2	Eastwood (9)	137
81	Desborough Town (9)	1–0	Hucknall Town (9)	211
82	Sherwood Colliery (9)	3–2	Moulton (9)	102
83	Woodbridge Town (9)	2–1	Heacham (9)	152
84	Wroxham (8)	0–2	Ipswich Wanderers (9)	245
85	Ely City (9)	2–2	March Town United (9)	259
86	Histon (9)	3–1	Brightlingsea Regent (8)	194
87	Haverhill Rovers (9)	0–2	Halstead Town (9)	121
88	Eynesbury Rovers (9)	2–3	Fakenham Town (8)	147
89	Godmanchester Rovers (9)	0–1	Newmarket Town (8)	144
90	Stowmarket Town (9)	1–1	St Neots Town (9)	245
91	Dereham Town (9)	1–1	Walsham-le-Willows (9)	181
93	Kirkley & Pakefield (9)	1–2	Little Oakley (8)	83
94	Mulbarton Wanderers (8)	6–0	Lakenheath (9)	
95	Lowestoft Town (8)	1–4	Cambridge City (8)	327
96	Harleston Town (9)	3–1	Great Yarmouth Town (9)	298
97	Brantham Athletic (9)	2–1	Soham Town Rangers (9)	136
98	Cornard United (9)	2–2	Downham Town (9)	98
99	Wisbech Town (9)	2–2	Saffron Walden Town (9)	242
100	Harwich & Parkeston (9)	0–2	Mildenhall Town (9)	220
101	Baldock Town (9)	3–0	Kempston Rovers (9)	105
102	Biggleswade United (9)	0–1	Woodford Town (9)	111
103	Harefield United (9)	3–1	Bowers & Pitsea (8)	103
104	North Greenford United (9)	6–0	Arlesey Town (9)	80
105	London Lions (8)	3–1	Rayners Lane (9)	120
106	Everett Rovers (9)	0–0	Kings Langley (9)	220
107	Hendon (8)	4–1	Soul Tower Hamlets (9)	211
108	Sawbridgeworth Town (9)	4–2	AFC Welwyn (9)	
109	Ilford (9)	1–2	Dunstable (9)	85
110	Bedfont Sports (8)	0–1	Concord Rangers (8)	82
112	Buckhurst Hill (8)	2–0	Barking (9)	201
113	Tilbury (8)	2–0	Wormley Rovers (9)	138
114	Harpenden Town (9)	1–3	Hayes & Yeading United (8)	251
115	Witham Town (8)	2–1	Colney Heath (9)	
116	Harlow Town (9)	0–1	Frenford (9)	147
Match played at Frenford
117	Haringey Borough (8)	5–0	Sporting Bengal United (9)	271
119	Northwood (9)	1–1	Hutton (9)	132
120	Leverstock Green (8)	2–1	Walthamstow (8)	122
121	Great Wakering Rovers (9)	0–2	Takeley (8)	132
122	Romford (9)	2–1	Barton Rovers (8)	90
123	Cockfosters (9)	2–2	Potton United (9)	152
126	Stotfold (8)	4–1	Basildon United (9)	181
127	Hullbridge Sports (9)	2–0	Hadley (8)	123
128	Clapton Community (9)	3–0	Benfleet (9)	702
130	Ardley United (9)	0–0	Portishead Town (9)	124

Tie	Home team (Tier)	Score	Away team (Tier)	Att.
131	Newport Pagnell Town (9)	2–2	Marlow (8)	256
132	North Leigh (9)	2–2	Amersham Town (9)	74
133	Easington Sports (9)	1–2	Mangotsfield United (9)	137
137	Windsor & Eton (8)	2–1	Bristol Manor Farm (8)	511
138	Wells City (9)	3–0	Aylesbury Vale Dynamos (9)	100
139	Holyport (9)	1–2	Wallingford & Crowmarsh (9)	
140	Roman Glass St George (9)	2–2	Hallen (9)	115
142	Swindon Supermarine (8)	3–1	Tuffley Rovers (9)	236
143	Highworth Town (9)	1–4	Milton Keynes Irish (8)	106
Match played at Cirencester Town
144	Beaconsfield Town (8)	0–3	Penn & Tylers Green (9)	58
145	Kidlington (9)	1–3	Larkhall Athletic (8)	108
146	Burnham (9)	1–1	Slimbridge (8)	105
148	Didcot Town (8)	2–0	Binfield (8)	
149	Royal Wootton Bassett Town (9)	0–2	Winslow United (8)	141
150	Malmesbury Victoria (9)	1–6	Longlevens (9)	133
151	Abingdon United (9)	1–2	Risborough Rangers (9)	207
152	Reading City (9)	1–0	Tring Athletic (9)	166
153	Thatcham Town (9)	5–1	Cinderford Town (9)	294
154	Beckenham Town (9)	3–2	Horley Town (8)	128
155	AFC Varndeanians (9)	1–3	Eastbourne Town (8)	
156	Petts Wood & Holmesdale (9)	2–2	Tooting & Mitcham United (9)	221
157	Bexhill United (9)	0–3	East Grinstead Town (9)	172
159	Balham (9)	2–0	Metropolitan Police (9)	130
161	Lancing (9)	0–6	SE Dons (9)	294
162	Midhurst & Easebourne (9)	2–0	Larkfield & New Hythe Wanderers (9)	67
164	Punjab United (8)	3–0	Seaford Town (9)	102
165	Horsham YM (9)	1–2	Peacehaven & Telscombe (8)	157
166	Virginia Water (9)	2–1	South Park (Reigate) (8)	97
167	Godalming Town (9)	0–1	Tunbridge Wells (9)	206
168	Deal Town (8)	2–1	Sutton Athletic (9)	436
170	Cobham (8)	3–1	Fisher (9)	110
171	Pagham (9)	1–1	Hollands & Blair (9)	153
172	Broadbridge Heath (8)	0–1	AFC Greenwich Borough (9)	117
174	Crawley Down Gatwick (9)	1–2	Sheerwater (9)	140
175	Whitstable Town (8)	3–1	Roffey (9)	461
176	Merstham (8)	3–3	Raynes Park Vale (8)	142
177	Kennington (9)	1–1	Sheppey United (8)	173
181	Redhill (9)	2–1	Ashford United (8)	237
182	Hassocks (9)	2–1	Sevenoaks Town (8)	223
183	Bedfont (9)	4–0	Chislehurst Glebe (9)	41
184	Sutton Common Rovers (9)	3–1	Phoenix Sports (9)	78
185	Rusthall (9)	3–1	Knaphill (9)	171
186	Faversham Town (8)	4–2	Corinthian-Casuals (9)	317
187	Corinthian (9)	1–1	Lingfield (9)	87
189	Epsom & Ewell (9)	1–0	Chipstead (9)	128
190	Ashford Town (Middlesex) (8)	1–2	Bearsted (9)	105
191	Herne Bay (8)	2–2	Broadfields United (9)	336
192	Steyning Town (8)	3–7	Erith Town (8)	105
193	Westbury United (8)	3–0	Hythe & Dibden (9)	210
194	Tadley Calleva (9)	2–1	Bemerton Heath Harlequins (9)	179
195	Portland United (8)	2–0	Sturminster Newton United (9)	290
196	Sherborne Town (9)	1–3	Baffins Milton Rovers (9)	132
197	Shepton Mallet (9)	0–0	Bashley (9)	201
198	Cowes Sports (9)	1–3	Hamble Club (9)	195
199	East Cowes Victoria Athletic (9)	0–2	AFC Stoneham (8)	189
200	Laverstock & Ford (9)	6–0	Eversley & California (9)	
201	Fleet Town (9)	0–1	Melksham Town (8)	265
202	Petersfield Town (9)	2–1	Fareham Town (9)	268
203	Badshot Lea (9)	6–3	Brockenhurst (9)	119
204	Millbrook (9)	2–0	Bradford Town (9)	129
205	Devizes Town (9)	1–0	Hamworthy Recreation (9)	169
206	Horndean (9)	1–4	Hartley Wintney (8)	
207	Yateley United (9)	2–2	Alton (9)	367
208	Paulton Rovers (8)	1–3	Fleetlands (9)	192
209	Andover New Street (9)	5–0	Christchurch (9)	178
210	Bournemouth (9)	1–2	Downton (9)	110
211	Buckland Athletic (9)	0–6	Barnstaple Town (8)	212
212	Bovey Tracey (9)	0–3	Exmouth Town (8)	367
213	Sidmouth Town (9)	2–3	Street (9)	108
214	Willand Rovers (8)	9–0	Wellington (9)	
215	Falmouth Town (8)	1–0	Bideford (8)	310
216	Saltash United (9)	1–3	Brixham (9)	135
217	Ivybridge Town (9)	4–0	Torpoint Athletic (9)	173
218	Tavistock (9)	0–0	St Blazey (9)	255
219	Liskeard Athletic (9)	0–2	Bridgwater United (9)	212
Sunday 9 August 2026
169	Erith & Belvedere (9)	4–1	Billingshurst (9)	201
24	Worsbrough Bridge Athletic (9)	0–2	Trafford (9)	328
77	Northampton ON Chenecks (9)	2–1	Heanor Town (9)	140
Match played at Wellingborough Town
173	Wick (9)	1–3	Camberley Town (9)	167
180	Little Common (9)	1–4	Haywards Heath Town (9)	168
31	Hallam (8)	0–3	Irlam (9)	703
38	Beverley Town (8)	0–0	Northwich Victoria (9)	666
160	Littlehampton Town (8)	1–0	Eastbourne United (9)	313
Wednesday 12 August 2026
136	Aylesbury United (8)	2–3	Flackwell Heath (8)	315
Replays
Tuesday 11 August 2026
132R	Amersham Town (9)	1–2	North Leigh (9)	181
171R	Hollands & Blair (9)	1–2	Pagham (9)	147
197R	Bashley (9)	2–3 (a.e.t.)	Shepton Mallet (9)	
1R	West Auckland Town (8)	3–2	Yarm & Eaglescliffe (9)	231
19R	Golcar United (9)	0–3	Horbury Town (9)	269
21R	West Didsbury & Chorlton (9)	0–1	Garforth Town (8)	414
23R	Ossett United (8)	1–0	Abbey Hey (9)	298
32R	Mossley (8)	2–0	Silsden (8)	336
39R	Atherton Collieries (8)	2–0	Barnoldswick Town (9)	241
40R	Glossop North End (9)	0–2	Tadcaster Albion (9)	305
41R	Droylsden (9)	3–0	Burscough (9)	0 (BCD)
57R	Ashby Ivanhoe (9)	3–1	Worcester Raiders (8)	215
63R	Hereford Pegasus (9)	3–5	Lutterworth Town (9)	158
64R	Nantwich Town (8)	1–1 (5–6 p)	Sporting Khalsa (9)	267
66R	Abbey Hulton United (9)	W/O (Note: Abbey Hulton United were awarded a walkover after Kidsgrove Athletic were eliminated from the competition for fielding an unregistered player in the 0–0 draw between the sides. Therefore, the scheduled replay was cancelled.)	Kidsgrove Athletic (8)	
85R	March Town United (9)	3–1	Ely City (9)	254
90R	St Neots Town (9)	4–2	Stowmarket Town (9)	230
91R	Walsham-le-Willows (9)	1–2	Dereham Town (9)	103
92R	Yaxley (9)	2–0	Thetford Town (9)	142
98R	Downham Town (9)	0–2 (a.e.t.)	Cornard United (9)	135
99R	Saffron Walden Town (9)	2–3	Wisbech Town (9)	214
106R	Kings Langley (9)	3–0	Everett Rovers (9)	365
123R	Potton United (9)	3–4 (a.e.t.)	Cockfosters (9)	168
130R	Portishead Town (9)	3–1	Ardley United (9)	295
131R	Marlow (8)	5–1	Newport Pagnell Town (9)	165
140R	Hallen (9)	W/O (Note: Roman Glass St George had initially won the tie 6–7 on penalties after the game had ended 3-3 in extra time, but Roman Glass St George were eliminated due to them using an ineligible player in the replay. Hallen were therefore reinstated back into the competition and were given a bye straight to the next round.)	Roman Glass St George (9)	118
156R	Tooting & Mitcham United (9)	2–3	Petts Wood & Holmesdale (9)	291
176R	Raynes Park Vale (8)	4–3	Merstham (8)	378
177R	Sheppey United (8)	6–2	Kennington (9)	277
191R	Broadfields United (9)	Void (Note: The score was 6–1 to Herne Bay, however a second replay was ordered after Herne Bay were allowed a sixth substitution.)	Herne Bay (8)	126
207R	Alton (9)	0–2	Yateley United (9)	364
29R	FC St Helens (9)	1–2	North Ferriby (8)	309
36R	Dearne & District (9)	0–0 (1–4 p)	Runcorn Town (9)	802
Wednesday 12 August 2026
4R	Easington Colliery (9)	3–2	Whitley Bay (9)	164
3R	North Shields (9)	1–2	Consett (8)	357
20R	Campion (9)	3–0	Frickley Athletic (9)	115
38R	Northwich Victoria (9)	1–0	Beverley Town (8)	195
119R	Hutton (9)	2–1	Northwood (9)	201
146R	Slimbridge (8)	2–1	Burnham (9)	181
187R	Lingfield (9)	3–5	Corinthian (9)	
218R	St Blazey (9)	2–0	Tavistock (9)	185
Tuesday 18 August 2026
191R	Broadfields United (9)	2–1 (a.e.t.)	Herne Bay (8)	131

== Preliminary round ==
The draw for the preliminary round was made on 3 July 2026.

Number of non-league teams per tier still in qualifying
National League (Note: National League teams joined in the fourth round of qualifying.)	North/South (Note: National League North/South teams joined in the second round of qualifying.)	Premier Division (Note: Premier Division teams joined in the first round of qualifying.)	Division One	Regional	Total
24 / 24	48 / 48	88 / 88	129 / 176	89 / 315	432 / 651

Tie	Home team (Tier) (Note: (9) represents teams allocated to divisions at the 9th tier of English football (otherwise known as Step 5 of the National League System). (8) represents the 8th tier (Step 4 NLS).)	Score	Away team (Tier)	Att.
Friday 21 August 2026
1	Redcar Town (9)	2–1	Bridlington Town (8)	289
13	Liversedge (8)	0–1	Ossett United (8)	631
62	Woodbridge Town (9)	0–1	Felixstowe & Walton United (8)	371
92	Hungerford Town (8)	1–1	Wokingham Town (9)	348
Saturday 22 August 2026
117	Jersey Bulls (8)	4–1	Sheerwater (9)	459
2	Ashington (8)	2–3	Thornaby (9)	372
3	Kendal Town (9)	2–2	Heaton Stannington (8)	261
4	Blyth Spartans (8)	2–1	Morpeth Town (8)	1,096
5	West Auckland Town (8)	0–1	Shildon (9)	261
6	Consett (8)	1–2	Marske United (9)	272
7	Crook Town (9)	0–3	Bishop Auckland (9)	621
8	Knaresborough Town (9)	2–1	Easington Colliery (9)	159
9	Carlisle City (9)	0–2	Dunston (8)	195
10	Pontefract Collieries (8)	8–0	Parkgate (9)	259
11	Tadcaster Albion (9)	2–1	Stalybridge Celtic (8)	277
12	1874 Northwich (8)	1–1	Horbury Town (9)	245
14	Runcorn Linnets (8)	2–3	Trafford (9)	416
15	Witton Albion (8)	1–0	Nelson (9)	378
16	North Ferriby (8)	2–1	Campion (9)	201
17	Stocksbridge Park Steels (8)	1–0	Cheadle Town (9)	195
18	Mossley (8)	0–4	Bradford (Park Avenue) (8)	456
19	Atherton Collieries (8)	3–0	Irlam (9)	120
20	Vauxhall Motors (8)	3–2	Thackley (9)	148
22	Lower Breck (8)	3–2	Euxton Villa (9)	164
23	Runcorn Town (9)	1–3	Prestwich Heys (9)	140
24	Droylsden (9)	1–2	Garforth Town (8)	508
25	Longridge Town (9)	2–3	South Liverpool (9)	148
26	Wythenshawe (8)	3–1	Clitheroe (8)	264
27	Litherland REMYCA (9)	1–1	Prescot Cables (8)	284
28	Lutterworth Town (9)	1–2	AFC Wolverhampton City (9)	51
29	Hanley Town (8)	3–3	Droitwich Spa (9)	143
30	Stafford Rangers (8)	2–1	Matlock Town (8)	1,025
31	Barwell (8)	1–2	Mickleover (8)	166
32	Rugby Borough (8)	0–1	Nuneaton Town (8)	452
33	Pershore Town (9)	2–3	Newcastle Town (8)	115
34	Sutton United (Birmingham) (9)	0–2	Abbey Hulton United (9)	325
35	Sporting Khalsa (9)	2–1	Shifnal Town (8)	157
36	Whitchurch Alport (9)	1–3	Coventry United (8)	
37	Coleshill Town (8)	0–1	Knowle (9)	214
38	Ashby Ivanhoe (9)	1–3	Bedworth United (8)	241
39	Boldmere St. Michaels (8)	1–0	Chasetown (8)	
40	Lye Town (9)	6–0	Lichfield City (8)	87
Match played at Bromsgrove Sporting
41	Shepshed Dynamo (8)	2–0	Romulus (9)	214
42	Rugby Town (9)	1–4	Belper Town (8)	242
43	Bottesford Town (9)	1–1	Bourne Town (8)	212
44	Retford (9)	0–1	Northampton ON Chenecks (9)	312
45	Corby Town (8)	0–1	Basford United (8)	360
46	Desborough Town (9)	2–0	Carlton Town (8)	148
47	Northampton Sileby Rangers (9)	2–0	AFC Mansfield (9)	121
48	AFC Rushden & Diamonds (8)	1–1	Long Eaton United (8)	411
49	Lincoln United (8)	0–2	Wellingborough Town (8)	203
50	Eastwood (9)	0–2	Barton Town (9)	84
51	Boston Town (8)	0–1	Sherwood Colliery (9)	
52	Mulbarton Wanderers (8)	1–0	Little Oakley (8)	208
53	Newmarket Town (8)	4–0	St Neots Town (9)	226
54	Cambridge City (8)	2–1	AFC Sudbury (8)	407
55	St Ives Town (8)	2–2	Fakenham Town (8)	168
56	Brantham Athletic (9)	3–1	Halstead Town (9)	135
57	Gorleston (8)	6–1	Mildenhall Town (9)	103
58	Yaxley (9)	0–0	Wisbech Town (9)	164
59	Harleston Town (9)	1–0	Dereham Town (9)	220
60	Ipswich Wanderers (9)	2–1	March Town United (9)	117
61	Histon (9)	3–4	Cornard United (9)	181
63	Biggleswade (8)	1–2	Buckhurst Hill (8)	114
64	Hutton (9)	1–2	Grays Athletic (8)	205
65	Dunstable (9)	1–0	North Greenford United (9)	197
66	Ware (8)	5–3	Leverstock Green (8)	190
67	Woodford Town (9)	3–1	Sawbridgeworth Town (9)	
68	Harefield United (9)	0–1	Hullbridge Sports (9)	90
69	Clapton Community (9)	1–2	Concord Rangers (8)	775
70	Hashtag United (8)	10–1	Enfield (9)	
71	Hayes & Yeading United (8)	6–3	White Ensign (9)	145
72	Kings Langley (9)	0–3	Canvey Island (8)	177
73	Hendon (8)	4–0	Hertford Town (8)	181
74	Romford (9)	2–2	Baldock Town (9)	128
75	West Essex (9)	0–3	Royston Town (8)	111
76	Witham Town (8)	2–2	Potters Bar Town (8)	189
77	Biggleswade Town (8)	1–0	Tilbury (8)	
78	Stotfold (8)	3–0	Cockfosters (9)	152
79	London Lions (8)	3–2	Redbridge (8)	90
80	Takeley (8)	1–3	Waltham Abbey (8)	185
81	Haringey Borough (8)	2–2	Frenford (9)	224

Tie	Home team (Tier)	Score	Away team (Tier)	Att.
82	Windsor & Eton (8)	5–0	North Leigh (9)	277
83	Winslow United (8)	2–2	Longlevens (9)	197
84	Mangotsfield United (9)	3–0	Thatcham Town (9)	315
85	Thame United (8)	7–1	Brislington (9)	124
86	Marlow (8)	0–1	Cirencester Town (9)	147
87	Wells City (9)	3–1	Risborough Rangers (9)	106
88	Reading City (9)	2–0	Fairford Town (9)	138
89	Bishop's Cleeve (8)	3–1	Wallingford & Crowmarsh (9)	174
90	Larkhall Athletic (8)	2–2	Portishead Town (9)	190
91	Didcot Town (8)	1–3	Swindon Supermarine (8)	382
93	Slimbridge (8)	2–2	Milton Keynes Irish (8)	106
94	Ascot United (8)	2–1	Penn & Tylers Green (9)	221
95	Flackwell Heath (8)	3–0	Hallen (9)	152
96	Egham Town (8)	3–0	Bearsted (9)	108
97	Harrow Borough (8)	1–3	Snodland Town (9)	169
98	Deal Town (8)	1–2	Southall (8)	503
99	Redhill (9)	2–1	Virginia Water (9)	212
100	Cray Valley Paper Mills (8)	2–4	AFC Greenwich Borough (9)	293
101	Bognor Regis Town (8)	1–2	East Grinstead Town (9)	486
102	Whitstable Town (8)	5–0	Newhaven (9)	466
103	Rusthall (9)	0–3	Sheppey United (8)	236
104	Peacehaven & Telscombe (8)	1–4	Margate (8)	
105	Pagham (9)	2–0	Balham (9)	
106	Camberley Town (9)	3–2	Beckenham Town (9)	85
107	Tunbridge Wells (9)	1–3	Kingstonian (8)	243
108	Erith Town (8)	3–0	Eastbourne Town (8)	
109	Cobham (8)	3–1	Littlehampton Town (8)	
110	Westfield (8)	1–1	Hassocks (9)	199
111	Bedfont (9)	0–0	Faversham Town (8)	
113	Epsom & Ewell (9)	0–3	Crowborough Athletic (8)	122
114	Punjab United (8)	1–1	SE Dons (9)	278
115	Raynes Park Vale (8)	1–5	Petts Wood & Holmesdale (9)	265
116	Sutton Common Rovers (9)	1–1	Haywards Heath Town (9)	128
118	Erith & Belvedere (9)	1–2	Sittingbourne (8)	150
119	Broadfields United (9)	1–1	Corinthian (9)	67
120	Moneyfields (8)	0–2	Portland United (8)	
121	AFC Stoneham (8)	3–3	Badshot Lea (9)	120
122	Dorchester Town (8)	3–1	Winchester City (8)	431
123	AFC Portchester (8)	2–2	Westbury United (8)	151
124	Devizes Town (9)	2–1	Melksham Town (8)	471
125	Andover New Street (9)	2–1	Shaftesbury (8)	203
126	Downton (9)	1–4	Millbrook (9)	
127	Weymouth (8)	6–0	Shepton Mallet (9)	763
128	Petersfield Town (9)	0–2	Laverstock & Ford (9)	147
130	Hamble Club (9)	0–0	Tadley Calleva (9)	106
131	Fleetlands (9)	3–0	Yateley United (9)	139
132	Tiverton Town (8)	2–1	Ivybridge Town (9)	233
133	Street (9)	1–2	Falmouth Town (8)	170
134	St Blazey (9)	2–1	Barnstaple Town (8)	185
135	Exmouth Town (8)	3–1	Bridgwater United (9)	310
136	Brixham (9)	2–0	Willand Rovers (8)	165
Sunday 23 August 2026
21	Northwich Victoria (9)	4–4	Bootle (8)	297
112	Midhurst & Easebourne (9)	1–3	AFC Croydon Athletic (8)	
Tuesday 25 August 2026
129	Baffins Milton Rovers (9)	1–0	Hartley Wintney (8)	167
Match played at Hartley Wintney
Replays
Tuesday 25 August 2026
3R	Heaton Stannington (8)	4–2	Kendal Town (9)	342
12R	Horbury Town (9)	1–0	1874 Northwich (8)	205
27R	Prescot Cables (8)	1–0	Litherland REMYCA (9)	395
29R	Droitwich Spa (9)	0–2	Hanley Town (8)	332
43R	Bourne Town (8)	5–1	Bottesford Town (9)	315
48R	Long Eaton United (8)	1–1 (3–4 p)	AFC Rushden & Diamonds (8)	272
55R	Fakenham Town (8)	2–0	St Ives Town (8)	232
58R	Wisbech Town (9)	2–2 (3–5 p)	Yaxley (9)	297
74R	Baldock Town (9)	0–1	Romford (9)	112
76R	Potters Bar Town (8)	0–1	Witham Town (8)	
81R	Frenford (9)	3–2 (a.e.t.)	Haringey Borough (8)	217
90R	Portishead Town (9)	1–0	Larkhall Athletic (8)	450
92R	Wokingham Town (9)	1–2	Hungerford Town (8)	378
93R	Milton Keynes Irish (8)	1–1 (3–4 p)	Slimbridge (8)	257
110R	Hassocks (9)	0–3	Westfield (8)	295
111R	Faversham Town (8)	4–0	Bedfont (9)	325
114R	SE Dons (9)	2–0	Punjab United (8)	551
116R	Haywards Heath Town (9)	2–1	Sutton Common Rovers (9)	214
119R	Corinthian (9)	0–1	Broadfields United (9)	126
121R	Badshot Lea (9)	0–2	AFC Stoneham (8)	219
123R	Westbury United (8)	0–1 (a.e.t.)	AFC Portchester (8)	
130R	Tadley Calleva (9)	3–1	Hamble Club (9)	157
Wednesday 26 August 2026
21R	Bootle (8)	0–1	Northwich Victoria (9)	241
83R	Longlevens (9)	1–1 (1–4 p)	Winslow United (8)	187

== First qualifying round ==
The draw for the first qualifying round was made on 24 August 2026. This round saw all teams from step three enter the competition.

Number of non-league teams per tier still in qualifying
National League (Note: National League teams joined in the fourth round of qualifying.)	North/South (Note: National League North/South teams joined in the second round of qualifying.)	Premier Division	Division One	Regional	Total
24 / 24	48 / 48	88 / 88	80 / 176	56 / 315	296 / 651

Tie	Home team (Tier) (Note: (9) represents teams allocated to divisions at the 9th tier of English football (otherwise known as Step 5 of the National League System). (8) represents the 8th tier (Step 4 NLS). (7) represents the 7th tier (Step 3 NLS).)	Score	Away team (Tier)	Att.
Friday 4 September 2026
17	Ossett United (8)	1–0	Pontefract Collieries (8)	617
36	Quorn (7)	2–1	Shepshed Dynamo (8)	1,004
61	Aveley (7)	4–2	Cheshunt (7)	261
74	Flackwell Heath (8)	0–1	Hanwell Town (7)	403
87	Three Bridges (7)	0–1	Kingstonian (8)	396
Saturday 5 September 2026
41	Knowle (9)	1–1	Worcester City (7)	931
10	Curzon Ashton (7)	1–2	Bradford (Park Avenue) (8)	226
69	Burgess Hill Town (7)	0–0	Jersey Bulls (8)	491
40	North Ferriby (8)	0–0	Barton Town (9)	558
1	Bamber Bridge (7)	1–3	Trafford (9)	375
2	Prescot Cables (8)	2–0	Horbury Town (9)	379
3	Redcar Town (9)	1–0	Blyth Spartans (8)	374
4	Vauxhall Motors (8)	0–2	Dunston (8)	197
5	Workington (7)	3–0	Marske United (9)	752
7	Heaton Stannington (8)	1–0	Knaresborough Town (9)	415
8	Shildon (9)	2–2	Warrington Town (7)	278
9	Avro (7)	0–2	Witton Albion (8)	344
11	Redcar Athletic (7)	1–0	Stocksbridge Park Steels (8)	304
12	Warrington Rylands 1906 (7)	3–1	Hyde United (7)	488
13	Garforth Town (8)	1–5	FC United of Manchester (7)	842
14	Lancaster City (7)	1–1	Tadcaster Albion (9)	445
15	South Liverpool (9)	2–2	Prestwich Heys (9)	189
16	Lower Breck (8)	5–1	Thornaby (9)	165
18	Whitby Town (7)	2–5	Ashton United (7)	317
19	Northwich Victoria (9)	2–3	Atherton Collieries (8)	252
20	Stockton Town (7)	2–2	Guiseley (7)	351
21	Bury (7)	8–0	Wythenshawe (8)	2,332
22	Cleethorpes Town (7)	1–2	Newcastle Town (8)	225
23	Alfreton Town (7)	0–2	Stratford Town (7)	267
25	Hanley Town (8)	2–1	Abbey Hulton United (9)	419
26	Bourne Town (8)	1–1	Boldmere St. Michaels (8)	
27	Stamford (7)	0–1	Mickleover (8)	277
28	Wellingborough Town (8)	2–2	Kettering Town (7)	931
29	Desborough Town (9)	0–3	AFC Rushden & Diamonds (8)	609
30	Sherwood Colliery (9)	2–4	Gainsborough Trinity (7)	285
31	Alvechurch (7)	2–0	AFC Wolverhampton City (9)	303
32	Malvern Town (7)	1–1	Redditch United (7)	480
33	Bromsgrove Sporting (7)	2–0	Nuneaton Town (8)	915
34	Halesowen Town (7)	3–1	Basford United (8)	628
35	Stafford Rangers (8)	3–0	Northampton ON Chenecks (9)	1,111
37	Coventry United (8)	2–1	Bedworth United (8)	161
38	Leamington (7)	3–1	Ilkeston Town (7)	435
39	Belper Town (8)	0–3	Evesham United (7)	552
42	Sporting Khalsa (9)	0–5	Leek Town (7)	236
43	Northampton Sileby Rangers (9)	0–4	Anstey Nomads (7)	125
44	Lye Town (9)	1–5	Racing Club Warwick (7)	240
45	Wingate & Finchley (7)	0–0	Felixstowe & Walton United (8)	207
46	Bishop's Stortford (7)	2–3	Berkhamsted (7)	365
47	Stanway Rovers (7)	0–0	Needham Market (7)	
48	Yaxley (9)	1–1	Buckhurst Hill (8)	110
49	Hendon (8)	7–3	Hullbridge Sports (9)	228
50	Peterborough Sports (7)	4–0	Ipswich Wanderers (9)	191
51	London Lions (8)	2–4	Bury Town (7)	90
52	Witham Town (8)	3–2	Stotfold (8)	215
53	Frenford (9)	0–4	Enfield Town (7)	362
54	Leighton Town (7)	1–4	Gorleston (8)	
55	Cambridge City (8)	6–1	Maldon & Tiptree (7)	462
56	Mulbarton Wanderers (8)	3–0	Cornard United (9)	268
57	Real Bedford (7)	4–1	Royston Town (8)	323
58	Harleston Town (9)	3–1	Romford (9)	269
59	St Albans City (7)	0–0	Hashtag United (8)	1,004
60	Dunstable (9)	1–3	Woodford Town (9)	196
62	Canvey Island (8)	1–1	Newmarket Town (8)	325
63	Brantham Athletic (9)	0–7	Waltham Abbey (8)	194
64	Ware (8)	3–3	Fakenham Town (8)	297
65	Grays Athletic (8)	0–0	Leiston (7)	204
66	Biggleswade Town (8)	1–1	Hitchin Town (7)	404
67	Concord Rangers (8)	0–0	Brentwood Town (7)	207
68	Redhill (9)	1–2	Sheppey United (8)	353
70	Lewes (7)	2–2	Cray Wanderers (7)	473
72	Dulwich Hamlet (7)	4–0	East Grinstead Town (9)	1,487
73	Crowborough Athletic (8)	1–1	AFC Whyteleafe (7)	219
75	Margate (8)	1–3	Snodland Town (9)	504
76	Sittingbourne (8)	3–4	AFC Greenwich Borough (9)	233

Tie	Home team (Tier)	Score	Away team (Tier)	Att.
77	Ramsgate (7)	1–0	Bracknell Town (7)	653
78	Hanworth Villa (7)	4–1	Whitstable Town (8)	328
79	Petts Wood & Holmesdale (9)	1–5	Windsor & Eton (8)	204
80	Leatherhead (7)	3–0	AFC Croydon Athletic (8)	550
81	Chertsey Town (7)	1–1	Carshalton Athletic (7)	474
82	Egham Town (8)	0–4	Chatham Town (7)	211
84	Faversham Town (8)	1–1	Welling United (7)	478
85	Whitehawk (7)	2–4	Eastbourne Borough (7)	
86	SE Dons (9)	2–0	Erith Town (8)	910
88	Hayes & Yeading United (8)	2–1	Camberley Town (9)	156
89	Broadfields United (9)	1–4	Chichester City (7)	73
90	Uxbridge (7)	3–0	Haywards Heath Town (9)	301
91	Westfield (8)	1–1	Dartford (7)	320
92	Yate Town (7)	3–0	Devizes Town (9)	283
93	Brixham (9)	2–3	Dorchester Town (8)	
94	Thame United (8)	3–2	Reading City (9)	180
95	Baffins Milton Rovers (9)	1–4	Slimbridge (8)	88
Match played at Moneyfields
96	Wimborne Town (7)	0–0	Portishead Town (9)	435
97	Winslow United (8)	0–0	Swindon Supermarine (8)	252
98	Wells City (9)	0–4	Hungerford Town (8)	166
99	Bishop's Cleeve (8)	2–1	Poole Town (7)	204
100	Sholing (7)	2–0	Andover New Street (9)	300
101	Bath City (7)	0–2	Weymouth (8)	1,176
102	Taunton Town (7)	4–0	Millbrook (9)	683
103	Gosport Borough (7)	1–3	Plymouth Parkway (7)	523
104	Falmouth Town (8)	2–4	Frome Town (7)	380
105	Basingstoke Town (7)	0–0	AFC Stoneham (8)	
106	St Blazey (9)	1–2	Tiverton Town (8)	193
107	Fleetlands (9)	0–3	Cirencester Town (9)	149
108	AFC Portchester (8)	2–1	Portland United (8)	143
109	Chippenham Town (7)	1–1	Havant & Waterlooville (7)	423
110	Tadley Calleva (9)	3–1	Laverstock & Ford (9)	197
111	Gloucester City (7)	1–1	Mangotsfield United (9)	567
112	Banbury United (7)	0–0	Exmouth Town (8)	
Sunday 6 September 2026
6	Emley (7)	1–1	Bishop Auckland (9)	428
24	Stourbridge (7)	1–3	Rushall Olympic (7)	645
71	Ascot United (8)	1–1	Pagham (9)	226
83	Southall (8)	2–1	Cobham (8)	172
Replays
Monday 7 September 2026
32R	Redditch United (7)	4–0	Malvern Town (7)	473
81R	Carshalton Athletic (7)	1–2	Chertsey Town (7)	298
97R	Swindon Supermarine (8)	3–1	Winslow United (8)	284
Tuesday 8 September 2026
71R	Pagham (9)	2–0	Ascot United (8)	211
8R	Warrington Town (7)	4–0	Shildon (9)	355
14R	Tadcaster Albion (9)	0–2	Lancaster City (7)	232
15R	Prestwich Heys (9)	1–2	South Liverpool (9)	210
20R	Guiseley (7)	2–1	Stockton Town (7)	370
26R	Boldmere St. Michaels (8)	2–1	Bourne Town (8)	
28R	Kettering Town (7)	2–1	Wellingborough Town (8)	1,087
40R	Barton Town (9)	2–0	North Ferriby (8)	547
41R	Worcester City (7)	1–0	Knowle (9)	869
45R	Felixstowe & Walton United (8)	0–2	Wingate & Finchley (7)	243
47R	Needham Market (7)	3–1	Stanway Rovers (7)	
48R	Buckhurst Hill (8)	3–0	Yaxley (9)	99
59R	Hashtag United (8)	0–2	St Albans City (7)	
62R	Newmarket Town (8)	0–1	Canvey Island (8)	
64R	Fakenham Town (8)	1–3	Ware (8)	204
65R	Leiston (7)	5–0	Grays Athletic (8)	202
66R	Hitchin Town (7)	3–0	Biggleswade Town (8)	436
67R	Brentwood Town (7)	4–2	Concord Rangers (8)	302
70R	Cray Wanderers (7)	1–0	Lewes (7)	174
84R	Welling United (7)	2–1	Faversham Town (8)	
91R	Dartford (7)	2–0	Westfield (8)	368
96R	Portishead Town (9)	1–3 (a.e.t.)	Wimborne Town (7)	
105R	AFC Stoneham (8)	1–0	Basingstoke Town (7)	
109R	Havant & Waterlooville (7)	1–3	Chippenham Town (7)	
111R	Mangotsfield United (9)	0–4	Gloucester City (7)	601
Wednesday 9 September 2026
6R	Bishop Auckland (9)	0–2 (a.e.t.)	Emley (7)	613
73R	AFC Whyteleafe (7)	2–3	Crowborough Athletic (8)	
112R	Exmouth Town (8)	2–1	Banbury United (7)	247
Tuesday 15 September 2026
69R	Jersey Bulls (8)	1–3	Burgess Hill Town (7)	428
Match played at Burgess Hill Town

=== Upsets ===
Giantkiller (tier)	Opponent (tier)
Upset of two leagues above
Trafford (level 9)	3–1 away vs Bamber Bridge (level 7)

== Second qualifying round ==
The draw for the second qualifying round was made on 7 September 2026. This round saw all teams from step two enter the competition. Twelve teams from Tier 9 (AFC Greenwich Borough, Barton Town, Cirencester Town, Harleston Town, Pagham, Redcar Town, SE Dons, Snodland Town, South Liverpool, Tadley Calleva, Trafford, and Woodford Town) were the lowest ranked teams remaining in the competition.

Number of non-league teams per tier still in qualifying
National League (Note: National League teams joined in the fourth round of qualifying.)	North/South	Premier Division	Division One	Regional	Total
24 / 24	48 / 48	59 / 88	41 / 176	12 / 315	184 / 651

Tie	Home team (Tier) (Note: (9) represents teams allocated to divisions at the 9th tier of English football (otherwise known as Step 5 of the National League System). (8) represents the 8th tier (Step 4 NLS). (7) represents the 7th tier (Step 3 NLS).)	Score	Away team (Tier)	Att.
Friday 18 September 2026
28	Worcester City (7)	2–1	Stratford Town (7)	784
79	Yate Town (7)	0–0	Chippenham Town (7)	
Saturday 19 September 2026
5	Redcar Town (9)	2–4	Darlington (6)	1,358
1	Heaton Stannington (8)	1–2	Trafford (9)	473
2	Emley (7)	0–4	Spennymoor Town (6)	424
3	Bury (7)	5–1	Workington (7)	2,532
4	Dunston (8)	0–2	Scarborough Athletic (6)	482
6	Buxton (6)	1–0	Ashton United (7)	705
7	Marine (6)	3–2	Radcliffe (6)	711
8	Lower Breck (8)	1–2	Chester (6)	
9	Atherton Collieries (8)	2–0	Prescot Cables (8)	356
10	Redcar Athletic (7)	1–2	Macclesfield (6)	773
11	Warrington Rylands 1906 (7)	0–1	Chorley (6)	
12	Hebburn Town (6)	1–4	Guiseley (7)	440
13	Warrington Town (7)	3–0	South Liverpool (9)	547
14	South Shields (6)	7–0	Witton Albion (8)	758
15	Morecambe (6)	2–0	Southport (6)	2,047
16	FC United of Manchester (7)	4–1	Ossett United (8)	1,143
17	Bradford (Park Avenue) (8)	1–0	Lancaster City (7)	547
18	Bromsgrove Sporting (7)	2–1	Leek Town (7)	687
19	Barton Town (9)	3–1	Boldmere St. Michaels (8)	394
20	Leamington (7)	1–1	Gainsborough Trinity (7)	439
21	Alvechurch (7)	3–1	Racing Club Warwick (7)	301
22	Harborough Town (6)	1–0	Rushall Olympic (7)	580
23	AFC Telford United (6)	2–2	Worksop Town (6)	997
24	Kettering Town (7)	2–0	Quorn (7)	879
25	Halesowen Town (7)	2–0	Mickleover (8)	754
26	Hednesford Town (6)	0–1	Coventry United (8)	1,351
27	Spalding United (6)	2–0	Hanley Town (8)	588
29	Stafford Rangers (8)	3–2	Hereford (6)	3,004
30	Anstey Nomads (7)	2–1	Newcastle Town (8)	
31	Redditch United (7)	3–0	Evesham United (7)	609
32	Witham Town (8)	0–3	St Albans City (7)	311
33	Gorleston (8)	3–4	Bury Town (7)	261
34	Chesham United (6)	7–2	Ware (8)	627
35	Berkhamsted (7)	4–1	Hendon (8)	593
36	Hemel Hempstead Town (6)	1–1	Wingate & Finchley (7)	462
37	Hitchin Town (7)	1–2	Leiston (7)	618
38	AFC Rushden & Diamonds (8)	3–1	Peterborough Sports (7)	589
39	Bedford Town (6)	2–1	King's Lynn Town (6)	613
40	Aveley (7)	2–3	Brentwood Town (7)	
41	Needham Market (7)	3–3	Braintree Town (6)	410
42	Cambridge City (8)	3–1	Buckhurst Hill (8)	503
43	Billericay Town (6)	1–3	Enfield Town (7)	897
44	Harleston Town (9)	1–2	Real Bedford (7)	339
45	Woodford Town (9)	Void (Note: The score was 2–1 to Mulbarton Wanderers, however a replay was ordered after a penalty scored by Woodford Town was disallowed.)	Mulbarton Wanderers (8)	
46	Canvey Island (8)	0–1	Chelmsford City (6)	576
47	Waltham Abbey (8)	1–1	Dagenham & Redbridge (6)	
48	Kingstonian (8)	0–1	Leatherhead (7)	303
49	Dartford (7)	4–2	Hayes & Yeading United (8)	592

Tie	Home team (Tier)	Score	Away team (Tier)	Att.
50	Chertsey Town (7)	3–2	AFC Greenwich Borough (9)	
51	Cray Wanderers (7)	1–1	Maidstone United (6)	862
52	Slough Town (6)	0–1	Chatham Town (7)	490
53	Dulwich Hamlet (7)	4–1	Welling United (7)	2,384
55	Eastbourne Borough (7)	3–0	Windsor & Eton (8)	610
56	Snodland Town (9)	0–1	Sheppey United (8)	621
57	Walton & Hersham (6)	0–3	Horsham (6)	662
58	Tonbridge Angels (6)	2–1	Ramsgate (7)	912
59	Hanwell Town (7)	2–1	Burgess Hill Town (7)	
60	Hampton & Richmond Borough (6)	3–3	Crowborough Athletic (8)	643
61	Uxbridge (7)	2–2	Farnborough (6)	459
62	Maidenhead United (6)	1–3	Ebbsfleet United (6)	675
63	Chichester City (7)	2–3	SE Dons (9)	650
64	Dover Athletic (6)	4–2	Folkestone Invicta (6)	2,342
65	Pagham (9)	0–6	Hanworth Villa (7)	
66	AFC Totton (6)	0–2	Gloucester City (7)	418
67	Torquay United (6)	6–1	AFC Stoneham (8)	1,297
68	Weston-super-Mare (6)	1–1	Wimborne Town (7)	487
69	Dorchester Town (8)	0–2	Oxford City (6)	578
70	Cirencester Town (9)	2–2	Farnham Town (6)	506
71	Swindon Supermarine (8)	1–3	Weymouth (8)	604
72	Slimbridge (8)	1–3	Hungerford Town (8)	188
73	Brackley Town (6)	1–0	AFC Portchester (8)	492
74	Tiverton Town (8)	0–1	Sholing (7)	286
75	Bishop's Cleeve (8)	0–1	Tadley Calleva (9)	218
76	Merthyr Town (6)	1–1	Truro City (6)	864
77	Frome Town (7)	0–2	Plymouth Parkway (7)	546
78	Thame United (8)	3–3	Exmouth Town (8)	156
80	Salisbury (6)	4–1	Taunton Town (7)	
Sunday 20 September 2026
54	Southall (8)	2–2	Dorking Wanderers (6)	
Replays
Tuesday 22 September 2026
20R	Gainsborough Trinity (7)	3–0	Leamington (7)	303
23R	Worksop Town (6)	5–2 (a.e.t.)	AFC Telford United (6)	
36R	Wingate & Finchley (7)	2–1	Hemel Hempstead Town (6)	307
41R	Braintree Town (6)	3–0	Needham Market (7)	
47R	Dagenham & Redbridge (6)	3–0	Waltham Abbey (8)	732
51R	Maidstone United (6)	0–2	Cray Wanderers (7)	1,126
54R	Dorking Wanderers (6)	5–4 (a.e.t.)	Southall (8)	
60R	Crowborough Athletic (8)	3–1	Hampton & Richmond Borough (6)	503
61R	Farnborough (6)	0–2	Uxbridge (7)	451
68R	Wimborne Town (7)	1–1 (4–3 p)	Weston-super-Mare (6)	540
70R	Farnham Town (6)	1–2	Cirencester Town (9)	610
76R	Truro City (6)	2–0	Merthyr Town (6)	931
79R	Chippenham Town (7)	2–1 (a.e.t.)	Yate Town (7)	515
Wednesday 23 September 2026
78R	Exmouth Town (8)	1–3	Thame United (8)	
Tuesday 29 September 2026
45R	Mulbarton Wanderers (8)	2–0	Woodford Town (9)	

=== Upsets ===
Giantkiller (tier)	Opponent (tier)
Upset of three leagues above
Cirencester Town (level 9)	2–1 away vs Farnham Town (level 6)
Upset of two leagues above
Coventry United (level 8)	1–0 away vs Hednesford Town (level 6)
Crowborough Athletic (level 8)	3–1 at home vs Hampton & Richmond Borough (level 6)
Stafford Rangers (level 8)	3–2 at home vs Hereford (level 6)
SE Dons (level 9)	3–2 away vs Chichester City (level 7)

== Third qualifying round ==
The draw for the third qualifying round was made on 21 September 2026. Five teams from Tier 9 (Barton Town, Cirencester Town, SE Dons, Tadley Calleva, and Trafford) were the lowest ranked teams remaining in the competition.

Number of non-league teams per tier still in qualifying
National League (Note: National League teams joined in the fourth round of qualifying.)	North/South	Premier Division	Division One	Regional	Total
24 / 24	28 / 48	35 / 88	12 / 176	5 / 315	104 / 651

Tie	Home team (Tier) (Note: (9) represents teams allocated to divisions at the 9th tier of English football (otherwise known as Step 5 of the National League System). (8) represents the 8th tier (Step 4 NLS). (7) represents the 7th tier (Step 3 NLS).)	Score	Away team (Tier)	Att.
Saturday 3 October 2026
22	Brentwood Town (7)	3–1	Dagenham & Redbridge (6)	1,600
1	Macclesfield (6)	2–2	Scarborough Athletic (6)	1,782
2	Marine (6)	2–0	Warrington Town (7)	1,597
3	Trafford (9)	2–2	Atherton Collieries (8)	1,092
4	Guiseley (7)	1–0	Bradford (Park Avenue) (8)	1,574
5	Gainsborough Trinity (7)	2–3	Anstey Nomads (7)	539
6	Morecambe (6)	3–0	Darlington (6)	2,184
7	Buxton (6)	0–2	South Shields (6)	878
8	Bury (7)	2–1	Bromsgrove Sporting (7)	3,342
9	Barton Town (9)	1–4	Chorley (6)	1,029
10	Worksop Town (6)	0–3	FC United of Manchester (7)	1,248
11	Stafford Rangers (8)	1–1	Halesowen Town (7)	3,130
12	Spennymoor Town (6)	4–1	Chester (6)	861
13	Mulbarton Wanderers (8)	1–2	Gloucester City (7)	1,002
14	Bury Town (7)	1–1	Spalding United (6)	1,205
15	Harborough Town (6)	3–2	St Albans City (7)	1,092
16	Bedford Town (6)	2–2	Wingate & Finchley (7)	816
17	Kettering Town (7)	1–3	Worcester City (7)	1,251
18	Cambridge City (8)	1–2	Alvechurch (7)	912
19	Brackley Town (6)	0–2	Chelmsford City (6)	784
20	Chesham United (6)	4–3	Real Bedford (7)	851
21	Oxford City (6)	6–1	Enfield Town (7)	
23	Leiston (7)	3–1	Coventry United (8)	379

Tie	Home team (Tier)	Score	Away team (Tier)	Att.
24	Redditch United (7)	0–2	Berkhamsted (7)	911
25	AFC Rushden & Diamonds (8)	2–1	Braintree Town (6)	1,181
26	Dorking Wanderers (6)	1–0	Chatham Town (7)	
27	Truro City (6)	4–0	Cirencester Town (9)	1,638
28	Tonbridge Angels (6)	0–1	Torquay United (6)	1,204
29	Weymouth (8)	1–5	SE Dons (9)	1,407
30	Sheppey United (8)	0–2	Chertsey Town (7)	568
31	Cray Wanderers (7)	3–0	Chippenham Town (7)	716
32	Crowborough Athletic (8)	1–2	Wimborne Town (7)	518
33	Plymouth Parkway (7)	2–1	Horsham (6)	623
34	Uxbridge (7)	3–1	Hungerford Town (8)	502
35	Ebbsfleet United (6)	1–2	Sholing (7)	863
36	Salisbury (6)	5–0	Dulwich Hamlet (7)	1,301
37	Thame United (8)	0–1	Eastbourne Borough (7)	415
38	Hanwell Town (7)	1–2	Dover Athletic (6)	1,057
39	Tadley Calleva (9)	2–1	Dartford (7)	898
40	Leatherhead (7)	1–0	Hanworth Villa (7)	1,140
Replays
Tuesday 6 October 2026
1R	Scarborough Athletic (6)	1–2 (a.e.t.)	Macclesfield (6)	1,178
3R	Atherton Collieries (8)	3–0	Trafford (9)	751
11R	Halesowen Town (7)	1–2	Stafford Rangers (8)	2,078
14R	Spalding United (6)	4–0	Bury Town (7)	731
16R	Wingate & Finchley (7)	1–3	Bedford Town (6)	461

=== Upsets ===
Giantkiller (tier)	Opponent (tier)
Upset of two leagues above
AFC Rushden & Diamonds (level 8)	2–1 at home vs Braintree Town (level 6)
Tadley Calleva (level 9)	2–1 at home vs Dartford (level 7)

== Fourth qualifying round ==
The draw for the fourth qualifying round was made on 5 October 2026. This round saw all teams from the National League enter the competition. Two teams from Tier 9 (SE Dons and Tadley Calleva) were the lowest ranked teams remaining in the competition.

Number of non-league teams per tier still in qualifying
National League	North/South	Premier Division	Division One	Regional	Total
24 / 24	17 / 48	18 / 88	3 / 176	2 / 315	64 / 651

Tie	Home team (Tier) (Note: (9) represents teams allocated to divisions at the 9th tier of English football (otherwise known as Step 5 of the National League System). (8) represents the 8th tier (Step 4 NLS). (7) represents the 7th tier (Step 3 NLS).)	Score	Away team (Tier)	Att.
Saturday 17 October 2026
11	Bury (7)	1–1	Harrogate Town (5)	4,910
1	Harborough Town (6)	3–1	Spennymoor Town (6)	975
2	Chorley (6)	1–1	Worcester City (7)	1,096
3	Gateshead (5)	1–1	Stafford Rangers (8)	1,033
4	FC Halifax Town (5)	3–2	South Shields (6)	1,307
5	Leiston (7)	0–3	Guiseley (7)	545
6	Barrow (5)	0–0	Gloucester City (7)	2,076
7	Hartlepool United (5)	0–2	Marine (6)	1,935
8	Boston United (5)	1–3	Scunthorpe United (5)	1,708
9	Macclesfield (6)	1–1	Anstey Nomads (7)	2,321
10	Altrincham (5)	0–0	FC United of Manchester (7)	3,005
12	Spalding United (6)	2–2	Alvechurch (7)	991
13	AFC Rushden & Diamonds (8)	2–1	Morecambe (6)	1,975
14	Kidderminster Harriers (5)	2–1	Solihull Moors (5)	2,478
15	Carlisle United (5)	2–1	Tamworth (5)	2,708
16	AFC Fylde (5)	5–0	Atherton Collieries (8)	1,202
17	Salisbury (6)	3–0	Eastbourne Borough (7)	1,011
18	Sutton United (5)	1–0	Truro City (6)	1,154
19	Chesham United (6)	0–0	Forest Green Rovers (5)	1,052
20	Leatherhead (7)	3–3	Yeovil Town (5)	2,000
21	Bedford Town (6)	0–0	Cray Wanderers (7)	1,283
22	Uxbridge (7)	0–4	Hornchurch (5)	863

Tie	Home team (Tier)	Score	Away team (Tier)	Att.
23	Aldershot Town (5)	2–2	Tadley Calleva (9)	2,886
24	Torquay United (6)	0–1	Oxford City (6)	2,283
25	Wimborne Town (7)	1–0	Chelmsford City (6)	1,262
26	Wealdstone (5)	3–0	Worthing (5)	942
27	Boreham Wood (5)	3–2	Woking (5)	1,252
28	Eastleigh (5)	3–2	Brentwood Town (7)	693
29	Southend United (5)	1–2	Berkhamsted (7)	4,610
30	Sholing (7)	2–0	SE Dons (9)	1,338
31	Plymouth Parkway (7)	2–0	Chertsey Town (7)	781
32	Dover Athletic (6)	3–2	Dorking Wanderers (6)	1,370
Replays
Tuesday 20 October 2026
2R	Worcester City (7)	1–0	Chorley (6)	1,061
3R	Stafford Rangers (8)	5–0	Gateshead (5)	3,130
6R	Gloucester City (7)	0–2	Barrow (5)	
9R	Anstey Nomads (7)	0–3	Macclesfield (6)	
10R	FC United of Manchester (7)	2–6	Altrincham (5)	1,642
11R	Harrogate Town (5)	3–1	Bury (7)	2,610
12R	Alvechurch (7)	4–0	Spalding United (6)	591
19R	Forest Green Rovers (5)	5–0	Chesham United (6)	529
20R	Yeovil Town (5)	5–2	Leatherhead (7)	2,094
21R	Cray Wanderers (7)	2–2 (4–3 p)	Bedford Town (6)	926
23R	Tadley Calleva (9)	0–2	Aldershot Town (5)	1,001

=== Upsets ===
Giantkiller (tier)	Opponent (tier)
Upset of three leagues above
Stafford Rangers (level 8)	5–0 at home vs Gateshead (level 5)
Upset of two leagues above
Berkhamsted (level 7)	2–1 away vs Southend United (level 5)
AFC Rushden & Diamonds (level 8)	2–1 at home vs Morecambe (level 6)

Number of non-league teams per tier that qualified for the competition
National League	North/South	Premier Division	Division One	Regional	Total
16 / 24	6 / 48	8 / 88	2 / 176	0 / 315	32 / 651

== Broadcasting ==
The qualifying rounds were not covered by the FA Cup's broadcasting contracts held by TNT Sports and BBC Sport for the competition proper, although one game per round was broadcast by the BBC on its media platforms. This year, the BBC started with the first qualifying round.

Round	Tie	Broadcaster
First qualifying round	Knowle v Worcester City	BBC Sport
Second qualifying round	Redcar Town v Darlington	BBC Sport
Third qualifying round	Brentwood Town v Dagenham & Redbridge	BBC Sport
Fourth qualifying round	Bury v Harrogate Town	BBC Sport
