= 2019–20 Eastern Counties Football League =

The 2019–20 season was the 77th season in the history of Eastern Counties Football League, a football competition in England. Teams are divided into three divisions, the Premier Division, Division One North and Division One South.

As a result of the COVID-19 pandemic, this season's competition was formally abandoned on 26 March 2020, with all results from the season being expunged, and no promotion or relegation taking place to, from, or within the competition. On 30 March 2020, sixty-six non-league clubs sent an open letter to the Football Association requesting that they reconsider their decision. A legal appeal against the decision, funded by the Northern Premier League's South Shields, was dismissed later in June.

== Premier Division ==
Eastern Counties Football League Premier Division
- Season: 2019–20
- Matches: 279
- Goals: 1,052 (3.77 per match)

The Premier Division featured 17 clubs which competed in the division last season, along with three new clubs:

- Mildenhall Town, relegated from the Isthmian League
- Stanway Rovers, transferred from the Essex Senior League
- Swaffham Town, promoted from Division One North

=== League table ===
Pos	Team	Pld	W	D	L	GF	GA	GD	Pts
1	Stowmarket Town	28	23	5	0	95	17	+78	74
2	Norwich United	27	18	5	4	73	26	+47	59
3	Stanway Rovers	28	18	5	5	70	32	+38	59
4	Newmarket Town	27	16	3	8	69	40	+29	51
5	Wroxham	25	14	5	6	37	18	+19	47
6	Brantham Athletic	31	15	2	14	44	54	−10	47
7	Woodbridge Town	28	14	3	11	71	61	+10	45
8	Mildenhall Town	28	14	2	12	53	41	+12	44
9	Long Melford	30	13	4	13	51	61	−10	43
10	Whitton United	28	12	6	10	49	55	−6	42
11	FC Clacton	28	11	6	11	61	48	+13	39
12	Godmanchester Rovers	25	12	2	11	51	52	−1	38
13	Kirkley & Pakefield	28	10	3	15	43	48	−5	33
14	Haverhill Rovers	28	8	6	14	45	65	−20	30
15	Swaffham Town	27	8	5	14	33	62	−29	29
16	Thetford Town	30	9	2	19	52	86	−34	29
17	Walsham-le-Willows	28	7	3	18	42	65	−23	24
18	Ely City	30	6	6	18	37	72	−35	24
19	Hadleigh United	27	5	5	17	36	69	−33	20
20	Gorleston	27	6	2	19	40	80	−40	20

Updated to match(es) played on 10 March 2020. Source: FA Full-Time
Rules for classification: 1) Points; 2) Goal difference; 3) Number of goals scored; 4) Number of matches won; 5) Head-to-head results

=== Stadia and locations ===
Locations of the Premier Division clubs

Team	Stadium	Capacity
Brantham Athletic	Brantham Leisure Centre	1,200
Ely City	Unwin Sports Ground	1,500
Clacton	The Rush Green Bowl	3,000
Godmanchester Rovers	Bearscroft Lane	1,050
Gorleston	Emerald Park	3,000
Hadleigh United	Millfield	3,000
Haverhill Rovers	New Croft	3,000
Kirkley & Pakefield	Walmer Road	2,000
Long Melford	Stoneylands	
Mildenhall Town	Recreation Way	2,000
Newmarket Town	Cricket Field Road	2,750
Norwich United	Plantation Park	3,000
Stanway Rovers	Hawthorns	1,500
Stowmarket Town	Greens Meadow	1,000
Swaffham Town	Shoemakers Lane	
Thetford Town	Mundford Road	1,500
Walsham-le-Willows	Summer Road	1,000
Whitton United	King George V Playing Fields	1,000
Woodbridge Town	Notcutts Park	3,000
Wroxham	Trafford Park	2,000

== Division One North ==
Eastern Counties Football League Division One North
- Season: 2019–20
- Matches: 278
- Goals: 1,100 (3.96 per match)

Division One North featured 17 clubs which competed in the division last season, along with three new clubs:

- Framlingham Town, relegated from the Premier Division
- Great Yarmouth Town, relegated from the Premier Division
- Sheringham, promoted from the Anglian Combination

=== League table ===
Pos	Team	Pld	W	D	L	GF	GA	GD	Pts	
1	Mulbarton Wanderers	28	21	4	3	78	30	+48	67	
2	Lakenheath	28	19	4	5	66	32	+34	61	
3	Downham Town	29	18	5	6	70	37	+33	59	
4	March Town United	28	17	4	7	77	37	+40	55	
5	Fakenham Town	28	17	2	9	72	37	+35	53	
6	Norwich CBS	27	16	4	7	67	34	+33	52	
7	Sheringham	30	15	3	12	66	52	+14	48	
8	Ipswich Wanderers	28	13	6	9	65	36	+29	45	
9	Debenham LC	26	14	2	10	50	48	+2	44	
10	Great Yarmouth Town	26	11	7	8	35	28	+7	40	
11	Diss Town	28	13	1	14	50	54	−4	40	
12	Needham Market reserves	28	9	6	13	51	72	−21	33	
13	AFC Sudbury reserves	29	9	5	15	60	66	−6	32	
14	Leiston reserves	27	10	1	16	56	86	−30	31	
15	Cornard United	27	9	3	15	41	60	−19	30	
16	Framlingham Town	28	8	4	16	55	70	−15	28	
17	Haverhill Borough	27	8	3	16	45	63	−18	27	
18	King's Lynn Town reserves	27	7	4	16	43	63	−20	25	
19	Felixstowe & Walton United reserves	28	5	2	21	21	89	−68	17	Resigned from the league
20	Wisbech St Mary	29	2	4	23	32	106	−74	10	

Updated to match(es) played on 11 March 2020. Source: FA Full-Time
Rules for classification: 1) Points; 2) Goal difference; 3) Number of goals scored; 4) Number of matches won; 5) Head-to-head results

=== Stadia and locations ===
Locations of Division One North clubs

Team	Stadium	Capacity
AFC Sudbury reserves	King's Marsh	2,500
Cornard United	Blackhouse Lane	2,000
Debenham LC	Maitlands	1,000
Diss Town	Brewers Green Lane	2,500
Downham Town	Memorial Field	1,000
Fakenham Town	Clipbush Park	2,000
Felixstowe & Walton United reserves	Dellwood Avenue	2,000
Framlingham Town	Badingham Road	
Great Yarmouth Town	Wellesley Recreation Ground	3,600
Haverhill Borough	New Croft (artificial, groundshare with Haverhill Rovers)	3,000
Ipswich Wanderers	Humber Doucy Lane	1,000
King's Lynn Town reserves	The Walks	5,733
Lakenheath	The Nest	
Leiston reserves	Victory Road	2,500
March Town United	The GER Sports Ground	
Mulbarton Wanderers	The Common	
Needham Market reserves	Bloomfields	4,000
Norwich CBS	FDC Bowthorpe	
Sheringham	Weybourne Road	
Wisbech St Mary	Beechings Close	

== Division One South ==
Eastern Counties Football League Division One South
- Season: 2019–20
- Matches: 221
- Goals: 841 (3.81 per match)

Division One South featured 17 clubs which competed in the division last season, along with three new clubs, relegated from the Essex Senior League:

- Barkingside
- Leyton Athletic

=== League table ===
Pos	Team	Pld	W	D	L	GF	GA	GD	Pts	
1	White Ensign	25	17	4	4	71	30	+41	55	
2	Lopes Tavares	22	16	2	4	53	22	+31	50	
3	Little Oakley	24	15	3	6	74	31	+43	48	
4	May & Baker	24	15	3	6	54	38	+16	48	
5	Holland	25	13	6	6	50	39	+11	45	
6	Barkingside	24	14	2	8	48	47	+1	44	
7	Halstead Town	25	13	3	9	52	40	+12	42	
8	Wormley Rovers	25	12	3	10	40	41	−1	39	
9	Coggeshall United	21	11	5	5	46	23	+23	38	
10	Harwich & Parkeston	26	10	7	9	44	41	+3	37	
11	Benfleet	27	11	4	12	59	66	−7	37	
12	Wivenhoe Town	25	11	3	11	54	40	+14	36	
13	Frenford	26	10	5	11	43	39	+4	35	
14	Burnham Ramblers	28	7	6	15	42	53	−11	27	
15	Hackney Wick	26	5	5	16	32	58	−26	20	
16	Brightlingsea Regent reserves	27	3	3	21	32	88	−56	12	Resigned from the league
17	Newbury Forest	22	2	3	17	30	67	−37	9	
18	Fire United	20	1	3	16	17	78	−61	6	Resigned from the league
19	Leyton Athletic	0	0	0	0	0	0	0	0 (Note: Leyton Athletic resigned from the league after playing, and losing, one game. This result had been expunged.)	Club folded, record expunged

Updated to match(es) played on 11 March 2020. Source: FA Full-Time
Rules for classification: 1) Points; 2) Goal difference; 3) Number of goals scored; 4) Number of matches won; 5) Head-to-head results

=== Stadia and locations ===
Locations of Division One South clubs
Greater London Division One South football clubs

Team	Stadium	Capacity
Barkingside	Cricklefield Stadium (groundshare with Ilford)	3,500
Benfleet	Park Lane (groundshare with Canvey Island)	4,100
Brightlingsea Regent reserves	North Road	1,000
Burnham Ramblers	Leslie Fields	2,000
Coggeshall United	West Street (groundshare with Coggeshall Town)	
Fire United	Terence MacMillan Stadium (groundshare with Lopes Tavares)	
Frenford	Jack Carter Centre	
Hackney Wick	Coles Park (groundshare with Haringey Borough)	
Halstead Town	Rosemary Lane	1,000
Harwich & Parkeston	Royal Oak	
Holland	Dulwich Road	
Leyton Athletic	Wadham Lodge	
Little Oakley	Memorial Ground	
Lopes Tavares	Terence MacMillan Stadium (groundshare with Fire United)	
May & Baker	Gale Street (groundshare with Barking RFC)	1,000
Newbury Forest	Oakside (groundshare with Redbridge)	3,000
White Ensign	Basildon Sports Village	
Wivenhoe Town	Broad Lane	2,876
Wormley Rovers	Wormley Playing Fields	
