= Leyton Athletic F.C. =

Association football club in England

Coordinates: 51°32′51.39″N 0°06′41.23″E

Leyton Athletic
- Full name: Leyton Athletic Football Club
- Founded: 2008 (as Wadham Lodge)
- Dissolved: 2019
- Chairman: Bandurio Kusumonegoro
- Manager: Fander Quiro Juntonique
- 2019–20: Eastern Counties League Division One South (resigned)
Home colours	Away colours

Leyton Athletic Football Club was a football club based in Walthamstow, London.

== History ==
Following the departure of Waltham Forest from the Wadham Lodge ground in 2008, Wadham Lodge F.C. was founded by former Waltham Forest assistant manager Martin Fitch. They started playing at the ground in place of the former tenants and joined the Essex Business Houses Football League. They finished third in their first season and then moved up to the Essex Olympian League, winning Division Three and then Division Two in consecutive seasons. In Division One, they finished 4th in 2011–12 and a second-place finish in 2012–13 saw them promoted again. After finishing 4th in the Premier Division in 2014–15, an application to join the Essex Senior League for 2015–16 was successful.

In 2018 the club was renamed Leyton Athletic. In August 2018, under manager Jason Ngandu, the club secured their first-ever victory in the FA Cup; Ngandu was the competition's youngest manager at the age of 25. A 3–0 win against Barkingside in the extra preliminary round secured their progress into the next round where they were knocked out by Great Wakering Rovers. The club were relegated at the end of the 2018–19 season after finishing bottom of the Essex Senior League. On 4 September 2019, it was announced the club was withdrawing from the league after failing to secure a suitable home ground for the 2019–20 season. The club subsequently folded.

== Honours ==
- Essex Olympian League
  - Division Two champions 2010–11
  - Division Three champions 2009–10

== Records ==
- Highest league position: 6th in Essex Senior League, 2015–16
- Best FA Cup performance: Preliminary round, 2018–19
- Best FA Vase performance: Second round, 2016–17
- Record attendance: 248 vs Clapton, Essex Senior League, 7 April 2018
