= Harleston Town F.C. =

Association football club in England

Coordinates: 52.402395°N 1.2956747°E

Harleston Town
- Full name: Harleston Town Football Club
- Founded: 1885
- Ground: Wilderness Lane, Harleston
- Chairman: Cliff Boardman
- Manager: Adam Gusterson
- League: Eastern Counties League Premier Division
- 2025–26: Eastern Counties League Premier Division, 9th of 18
Home colours	Away colours

Harleston Town Football Club is a football club based in Harleston, Norfolk, England. They are currently members of the Eastern Counties League Premier Division and play at Wilderness Lane.

== History ==
The club was established in 1885. They became members of the top division of the East Anglian League in 1952. In 1963–64 the club won the league's Knockout Cup, beating Norman Old Boys in the final. At the end of the season the league merged with the Norfolk & Suffolk League to form the Anglian Combination, with Harleston placed in Section A. However, they were subsequently relegated several divisions.

In 1980–81 Harleston were Division Three champions. They went on to win Division Two the following season, earning promotion to Division One. Following two relegations, in 2005–06 the club finished bottom of Division Three and were relegated to Division Four. A third-place finish in Division Four in 2008–09 saw them promoted back to Division Three. The club were champions of Division Three again in 2010–11 before winning the Division Two title in 2011–12.

After finishing as runners-up in Division One in 2013–14, Harleston were promoted to the Premier Division. They were Premier Division runners-up in 2016–17 and won the division the following season, earning promotion to Division One North of the Eastern Counties League. The 2018–19 season saw the club win the Division One Knock-out Cup, beating Holland 6–0 in the final, and finished as runners-up in Division One North. However, the club were relegated back to the Anglian Combination Premier Division as their ground failed the grading criteria by not having floodlights. However, at the end of the 2020–21 season they were promoted back into Division One North of the Eastern Counties League.

In their first season back in Division One North Harleston were runners-up, qualifying for the promotion play-offs. After beating Framlingham Town 2–1 in the semi-finals, they defeated Downham Town 3–1 in the final to earn promotion to the Premier Division.

== Honours ==
- Eastern Counties League
  - Division One Knock-out Cup winners 2018–19
- Anglian Combination
  - Premier Division champions 2017–18
  - Division Two champions 1981–82, 2011–12
  - Division Three champions 1980–81, 2010–11
- East Anglian League
  - Knockout Cup winners 1963–64

== Records ==
- Best FA Cup performance: Second qualifying round, 2026–27
- Best FA Vase performance: Second round, 2024–25

== See also ==
- Harleston Town F.C. managers
