= Peterborough North End Sports F.C. =

Coordinates: 52°35′38″N 0°15′17″W

Peterborough North End Sports
- Full name: Peterborough North End Sports Football Club
- Founded: 2019
- Dissolved: 2022
- Ground: Lincoln Road, Peterborough
Home colours

Peterborough North End Sports Football Club was a football club based in Peterborough, England. They played at Lincoln Road, groundsharing with Peterborough Sports.

== History ==
Peterborough North End Sports were founded in 2019, following a merger between Peterborough Sports Development, who were formed in the aftermath of World War I and Bretton North End, who were founded in the early 1980s. Upon the formation of the new club, Peterborough North End Sports were placed into the Peterborough and District Football League. In 2021, the club was admitted into the Eastern Counties League Division One. In 2022, despite finishing eighth in the Eastern Counties League Division One, Peterborough North End opted to return to the Peterborough and District League and folded that year.

== Ground ==
The club groundshared with Peterborough Sports, playing at Lincoln Road in Peterborough.
