= Framlingham Town F.C. =

Association football club in England

Coordinates: 52.22352°N 1.35181°E

Framlingham Town
- Full name: Framlingham Town Football Club
- Nicknames: The Castlemen, Fram, Greens
- Founded: 1887
- Ground: Badingham Road, Framlingham
- Chairman: Sebastian Paternoster
- Manager: David Cannon
- League: Eastern Counties League Division One North
- 2025–26: Eastern Counties League Division One North, 3rd of 20
Home colours

Framlingham Town Football Club is a football club based in Framlingham, Suffolk, England. Affiliated to the Suffolk County Football Association, they are currently members of the Eastern Counties League Division One North and play at Badingham Road.

== History ==
The club was established in 1887 and started playing in the Ipswich & District League. They dropped into the Framlingham League, before playing in the Leiston League and the Woodbridge League and returning to the Ipswich & District League.

Framlingham won Division Two of the (renamed) Suffolk & Ipswich League in 1980–81, and the League Cup in 1989–90. In 1991–92 they won the Senior Division and the League Cup. Although they applied to join Division One of the Eastern Counties League, they were rejected because they did not have a stand or floodlights. In 1995–96 they reached the final of the Suffolk Senior Cup, losing 3–0 to Grundisburgh. In 2010–11 they entered the FA Vase for the first time.

At the end of the 2011–12 season Framlingham were relegated from the Senior Division to Division One. In 2014–15 the club finished second in Division One, earning promotion back to the Senior Division. After finishing fifth in the Senior Division in 2015–16, the club were promoted to Division One of the Eastern Counties League. They were Division One runners-up in 2017–18, securing promotion to the Premier Division. However, they finished bottom of the Premier Division the following season and were relegated to Division One North. In 2021–22 the club finished fifth in Division One North, qualifying for the promotion play-offs, in which they lost 1–0 to Harleston Town in the semi-finals. They finished third in the division in 2022–23, qualifying for the play-offs again. However, they lost 5–4 on penalties to Harwich & Parkeston after a 1–1 draw in the semi-finals.

In 2023–24 Framlingham were runners-up in Division One North, going on to lose 2–1 to Cornard United in the play-off semi-finals.

== Ground ==
The club initially played at Dickson's Meadow, before moving to Brunnings Meadow, both of which are now part of Framlingham College. They later moved to the Red House Farm and then Hayning's Meadow in 1932; Hayning's Meadow was subsequently renamed Pageant Field after a pageant took place at the site in 1935. In 1951 a group of demobilised soldiers from World War II bought sixteen acres of land on Badingham Road to establish a new sports club; the club later moved to the site, and then bought it in 1983. A clubhouse was built on one side of the pitch, incorporating a seated stand named after John Durrant, with a small covered stand erected on the other side of the pitch. Floodlights were installed in the early 2000s after being bought from the Sizewell B nuclear power station.

== Honours ==
- Suffolk & Ipswich League
  - Senior Division champions 1991–92
  - Division Two champions 1980–81
  - League Cup winners 1989–90, 1991–92

== Records ==
- Best FA Cup performance: Preliminary round, 2017–18, 2019–20
- Best FA Vase performance: First round, 2010–11, 2023–24
