= Downham Town F.C. =

Association football club in England

Coordinates: 52°36′34.02″N 0°23′3.79″E

Downham Town
- Full name: Downham Town Football Club
- Nickname: Town
- Founded: 1881
- Ground: Memorial Field, Downham Market
- Chairman: James Taylor
- Manager: Craig Dickson
- League: Eastern Counties League Premier Division
- 2025–26: Isthmian League North Division, 20th of 22 (relegated)
| Home colours | Away colours |

Downham Town Football Club is a football club based in Downham Market, Norfolk, England. Affiliated to the Norfolk County Football Association, they are currently members of the Eastern Counties League Premier Division and play at Memorial Field.

== History ==
The club was established in 1881, and were originally nicknamed the Saints. They initially played in junior leagues in the King's Lynn area, before joining the Peterborough & District League in 1949, when they gained senior status after being elected to the league's Premier Division. In 1961–62 they won the Peterborough Senior Cup, which they retained the following year, also winning the Peterborough & District League title. In 1963–64 they won the Norfolk Senior Cup, winning it again two years later. Further victories in the Peterborough Senior Cup came in 1966–67, 1971–72 and 1986–87, whilst the league title was won in 1973–74, 1978–79. Following back-to-back titles in 1986–87 and 1987–88, the club became founding members of the new Division One of the Eastern Counties League in 1988. They remained in the division until 2018, when the league reorganisation saw them placed in Division One North. In 2021–22 the club finished third in Division One North, qualifying for the promotion play-offs. Although they beat Norwich CBS 1–0 in the semi-finals, they lost 3–1 to Harleston Town in the final. The following season saw them finish as runners-up in the division, this time winning the promotion play-offs by beating Whittlesey Athletic 4–1 in the semi-finals and Harwich & Parkeston 4–0 in the final to earn promotion to the Premier Division.

Downham won the Norfolk Senior Cup for a third time in 2023–24, beating Gorleston 4–2 in the final. In 2024–25 they finished third in the Premier Division. In the subsequent play-offs they defeated Ely City 3–0 in the semi-finals and then beat Walsham-le-Willows 2–1 in the final to earn promotion to the North Division of the Isthmian League. In 2025–26 the club finished third-from-bottom of the North Division and were relegated back to the Premier Division of the Eastern Counties League.

== Ground ==
The club plays at the Memorial Field, which is shared with the local cricket club. As a result, the ground only has three sides with hardstanding; one touchline features a seated main stand and two covered standing areas, with the area behind both goals consisting of hardstanding.

== Honours ==
- Peterborough & District League
  - Champions 1962–63, 1973–74, 1978–79, 1986–87, 1987–88
- Norfolk Senior Cup
  - Winners 1963–64, 1965–66, 2023–24
- Norfolk Primary Cup
  - Winners 1990–91
- Peterborough Senior Cup
  - Winners 1961–62, 1962–63, 1966–67, 1971–72, 1986–87
- Isle of Ely Challenge Cup
  - Winners 1985–86, 1987–88
- Harry Overland Cup
  - Winners 1996–97, 1998–99
- West Norfolk Cup
  - Winners 1987–88
- Bill Knott Trophy
  - Winners 1989–90, 1991–92

== Records ==
- Best FA Cup performance: Preliminary round, 2024–25
- Best FA Trophy performance: First qualifying round, 2025–26
- Best FA Vase performance: Third round, 1986–87
- Record attendance: 1,500 vs Norwich City, 1948–49, friendly match

== See also ==
- Downham Town F.C. players
