= Wisbech St Mary F.C. =

Association football club in England

Coordinates: 52°39′20.1″N 0°5′48.2″E

Wisbech St Mary
- Full name: Wisbech St Mary Football Club
- Nickname: The Saints
- Founded: 1993
- Ground: Beechings Close, Wisbech St Mary
- Chairman: Mark Miller
- Manager: Harry Griffin
- League: Cambridgeshire League Premier Division
- 2024–25: Cambridgeshire League Premier Division, 11th of 13
Home colours

Wisbech St Mary Football Club is a football club based in Wisbech St Mary, Cambridgeshire in England. The club are currently members of the Cambridgeshire League Premier Division and play at Beechings Close.

== History ==
The club was established in 1993 and joined Division 5B of the Cambridgeshire League. A third-place finish in Division 3B in 2005–06 saw the club promoted to Division 2B. After finishing as runners-up in Division 2B in 2006–07, they were promoted to Division 1B. They won the division in 2008–09, earning promotion to the Senior B division. They won the Senior B division in 2010–11, and were promoted to the Senior A division. A third-place finish the following season resulted in promotion to the Premier Division.

In 2013 the club applied for promotion to the Eastern Counties League, but were unsuccessful as they finished seventh in the Cambridgeshire League Premier Division. The club entered the FA Vase for the first time in 2015. After finishing fifth in the Premier Division in 2015–16, they were promoted to Division One of the Eastern Counties League. When the division was split in 2018, the club were placed in Division One North. In 2021–22 they finished bottom of Division One North and were relegated back to the Premier Division of the Cambridgeshire League.

== Ground ==
The club play their home games at Beechings Close. The ground has a 50-seater stand which was added in January 2017.

== Honours ==
- Cambridgeshire League
  - Senior B Division champions 2010–11
  - Division 1B champions 2008–09

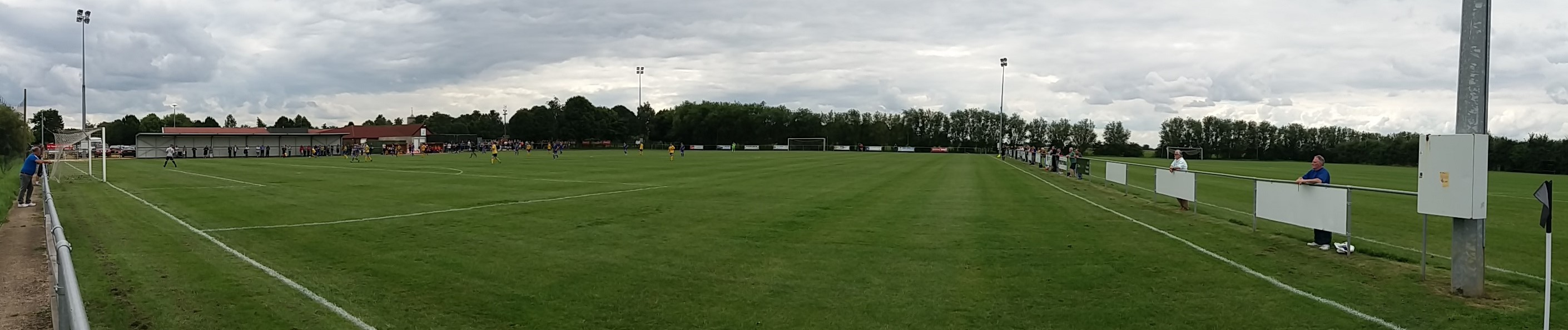
Beechings Close
