= Fakenham Town F.C. =

Association football club in England

Coordinates: 52°50′24″N 0°52′21″E

Fakenham Town
- Full name: Fakenham Town Football Club
- Nickname: The Ghosts
- Founded: 1884
- Ground: Clipbush Park, Fakenham
- Chairman: Douglas Colman
- Manager: Andy Kennedy
- League: Isthmian League North Division
- 2025–26: Eastern Counties League Premier Division, 5th of 18 (promoted via play-offs)
Home colours	Away colours

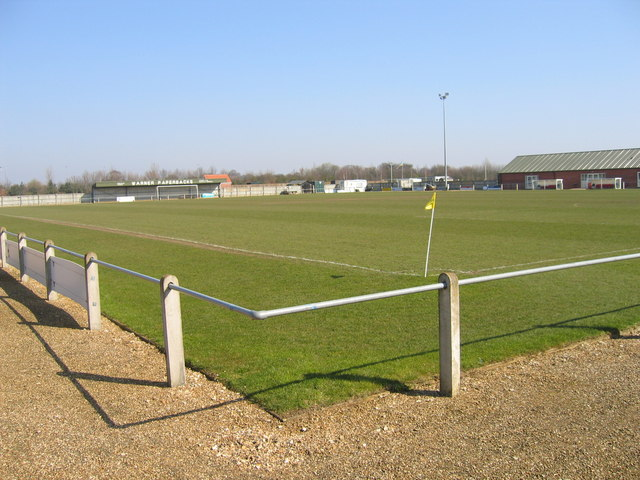
Clipbush Park, the club's home ground

Fakenham Town Football Club is a football club based in Fakenham, Norfolk, England. Affiliated to the Norfolk County Football Association, they are currently members of the Isthmian League North Division and play at Clipbush Park.

== History ==
The club was established in 1884 and played their first match against Lynn Alexandria, winning 2–1. In 1899–1900 they won the Norfolk Junior Cup, a feat repeated in 1905–06. In the early 1900s the club joined the Norwich & District League. After World War I they did not rejoin the league until 1921–22. In 1935 they moved up to the Norfolk & Suffolk League. When the league merged with the East Anglian League to form the Anglian Combination in 1964, Fakenham were placed in the top division for the 1964–65 season, but were relegated at the end of the 1965–66 season. In 1970–71 they won the Norfolk Senior Cup for the first time. The following season they won Division One and returned to the Premier Division. They went on to win the Norfolk Senior Cup again in 1972–73 and 1973–74, as well as the Anglian Combination Senior Cup in 1978–79.

In 1988 Fakenham became founder members of Division One of the Eastern Counties League. After finishing second in 1991–92, a season in which they defeated Diss Town after a replay to win the Senior Cup again, the club were promoted to the Premier Division. In 1994 they won the Senior Cup again with a 4–0 win against King's Lynn in the final. They retained it the following season, beating Gorleston 2–1 in the final, before going on to win it for a seventh time in 1999. After finishing as runners-up in 1998–99, the club went into decline, and was relegated back to Division One in 2003–04, finishing bottom of the table. In 2005–06 they won the Division One Knock-Out Cup, but a slump in league form saw them finish bottom of Division One in 2008–09 and 2009–10.

Fakenham were Division One runners-up in 2013–14 season, earning promotion back to the Premier Division. The 2017–18 season saw them finish third-from-bottom of the Premier Division, resulting in relegation to Division One North. In 2021 the club were promoted to the Premier Division based on their results in the abandoned 2019–20 and 2020–21 seasons. In 2024–25 they were runners-up in the Premier Division, missing out on the title on goal difference. In the subsequent promotion play-offs the club were beaten 1–0 in the semi-finals by Walsham-le-Willows.

The following season saw Fakenham finish fifth in the Premer Division. They went on beat Haverhill Rovers 2–0 in the semi-finals, and then defeated Soham Town Rangers on penalties in the final to earn promotion to the North Division of the Isthmian League.

== Ground ==
The club initially played at Hempton Green, with over 2,000 spectators in the ground to see a match against Holt in a match played on Good Friday. They moved to Star Meadow in 1889, and then to Baron's Hall Lawn in 1907, a ground that was shared with the local cricket club. Cover and seating for spectators was provided by 'the Shed', a stand behind the goal at the Town End. Floodlights were installed in 1987. When the club were promoted to the Premier Division of the Eastern Counties League in 1992 they were given three years to find a new ground or be relegated.

In 1996 the club moved to a new ground on the edge of the town named Clipbush Park, which was officially opened with a match against Watford on 16 July 1997, attracting a crowd of over 1,100, although the first match had been on 12 October 1996 when they defeated Tiptree United 4–0. It includes a seated stand on one side of the pitch, a clubhouse on the other, and covered standing behind both goals.

== Honours ==
- Eastern Counties League
  - Division One Knock-Out Cup winners 2005–06
- Anglian Combination
  - Division One champions 1971–72
  - Senior Knock-Out Cup winners 1978–79
- Norfolk Senior Cup
  - Winners 1970–71, 1972–73, 1973–74, 1991–92, 1993–94, 1994–95, 1998–99
- Norfolk Junior Cup
  - Winners 1899–1900, 1905–06

== Records ==
- Best FA Cup performance: First qualifying round, 1999–2000, 2001–02, 2026–27
- Best FA Vase performance: Fourth round, 2020–21, 2021–22
- Record attendance:
  - At Hempton Green: 2,000 vs Holt
  - At Baron's Hall Lawn: 1,100 vs Norwich City, friendly, 29 September 1987
  - At Clipbush Park: 2,000+ vs Norwich City, friendly July 2006

== See also ==
- Fakenham Town F.C. players
