= Hackney Wick F.C. =

Association football club in England

Coordinates: 51°47′58.80″N 0°37′35.81″E

Hackney Wick
- Full name: Hackney Wick Football Club
- Nickname: The Wickers
- Founded: 1995 (Bari); 2015 (Hackney Wick); 2017 (merger)
- Ground: Spa Road, Witham
- Capacity: 2,500 (157 seated)
- Chairman: Bobby Kasanga
- League: Essex Senior League
- 2025–26: Essex Senior League, 12th of 20
| Home colours | Away colours |

Hackney Wick Football Club is a football club based in Hackney Wick, Greater London United Kingdom. They are currently members of the Essex Senior League and play at Spa Road in Witham.

== History ==
Bari Football Club was established in 1995 and played in the South Essex Football League until 1998. After leaving, the club joined Division One of the Asian League. In 2011–12 the club won the Essex Corinthian Sunday Football League. They then successfully applied to join the Essex Senior League, adopting the name London Bari. In the club's first season in the league, they finished tenth. The following season saw them finish bottom of the league.

In 2017 the club merged with Middlesex County League club Hackney Wick, which had been founded in 2015 and played at Mabley Green in Hackney. The merged club took the Hackney Wick name and London Bari's place in the Essex Senior League. In 2017–18 they finished bottom of the Essex Senior League and were relegated to the new Division One South of the Eastern Counties League.

In 2024–25 Hackney Wick won the League Cup with a 2–1 win over Harlow Town in the final. They were also runners-up in Division One South, qualifying for the promotion play-offs. After beating Hutton 4–1 in the semi-finals, they defeated Rayleigh Town 2–0 in the final to earn promotion to the Essex Senior League.

== Ground ==
After joining the Essex Senior League, London Bari started groundsharing with Clapton at the Old Spotted Dog Ground. The merged club continued playing at the ground. The club was due to move to the London Marathon Community Track stadium for the 2018–19 season, but ground issues put the move on hold and the club remained at the Old Spotted Dog Ground. In the opening weeks of the 2019–20 season, Hackney Wick, and fellow tenants Clapton, were forced to vacate the Old Spotted Dog due to issues at the ground. Hackney Wick subsequently entered a groundsharing agreement with Haringey Borough at Coles Park. On 23 July 2020, the club announced a groundsharing agreement with Witham Town at Spa Road.

== Honours ==
- Eastern Counties Football League
  - League Cup winners 2024–25

== Records ==
- Best FA Cup performance: Second qualifying round, 2025–26
- Best FA Vase performance: First round, 2016–17, 2019–20
- Record attendance: 785 vs Clapton, Essex Senior League, 7 October 2017
