= Cornard United F.C. =

Association football club in England

Coordinates: 52°01′18.73″N 0°45′13.14″E

Cornard United
- Full name: Cornard United Football Club
- Nickname: The Ards
- Founded: 1964
- Ground: Blackhouse Lane, Great Cornard
- Chairman: Tom Keane
- Manager: Cameron Scorer
- League: Eastern Counties League Premier Division
- 2025–26: Eastern Counties League Premier Division, 16th of 18
| Home colours | Away colours |

Cornard United Football Club is a football club based in Great Cornard, near Sudbury, Suffolk, England. They are currently members of the Eastern Counties League Premier Division and play at Blackhouse Lane.

== History ==
The club was established in 1964, and initially played in the Sudbury Sunday League, before joining Division Three of the Bury and District League in 1966. They were promoted to Division Two at the end of their first season, and were promoted again the next. In 1970 they transferred to Division Six of the Colchester & East Essex League. In 1971–72 they won the division, and were promoted to Division Five. The following season they won all 26 matches and were promoted again. The next two seasons also saw the club promoted as champions, reaching Division Two in 1975.

In 1976 the club switched leagues again, this time to Division One of the Essex and Suffolk Border League. Although they were placed in Division Two after restructuring in 1978, they were promoted to Division One in 1982–83 after finishing as Division Two runners-up. In 1985–86 they were promoted to the Premier Division, and in the 1988–89 season they won the league, the league cup (beating Tiptree United Reserves on penalties after a 1–1 draw in the final) and the Suffolk Senior Cup with a 1–0 win against Sudbury Wanderers in the final. At the end of the season they were promoted to Division One of the Eastern Counties League.

They won the division at the first attempt, and were promoted to the Premier Division, where they remained until 1996, when they finished bottom and were relegated. In 2001 the club attempted to change their name to Sudbury Borough, but it was rejected by the parish council. They reached the final of the Suffolk Senior Cup in 2018–19, losing 4–3 to Achilles. Following league restructuring, Cornard were placed in Division One North in 2018. They were transferred to Division One South in 2021, and back to Division One North the following year. In 2023–24 the club finished fifth in the division, qualifying for the promotion play-offs. After beating Framlingham Town 2–1 in the semi-finals, they defeated Holland 3–1 in the final to earn promotion to the Premier Division.

== Ground ==
The club initially played at the Great Cornard Recreation Ground, before moving to Great Cornard Upper School in 1975. In 1982 they moved to their current ground on Blackhouse Lane, although they continued to use the changing facilities at the school until the start of the 1983–84 season. When the club joined the ECL in 1990 the pitch was moved to the top end of Blackhouse Lane.

== Honours ==
- Eastern Counties League
  - Division One champions 1989–90
- Essex & Suffolk Border League
  - Premier Division champions 1988–89
  - League Cup Winners 1988–89
- Colchester & East Essex League
  - Division Three champions 1974–75
  - Division Four champions 1973–74
  - Division Five champions 1972–73
  - Division Six champions 1971–72
- Eastern Floodlight Cup
  - Winners 2002
- Suffolk Senior Cup
  - Winners 1988–89

== Records ==
- Best FA Cup performance: First qualifying round, 1993–94, 1994–95, 2004–05, 2008–09, 2026–27
- Best FA Vase performance: Second round, 2008–09
- Record attendance: 400 vs West Ham United, friendly match, 2001–02
- Most appearances: Keith Featherstone
- Most goals: Andy Smiles

== See also ==
- Cornard United F.C. players
