= Harwich & Parkeston F.C. =

Association football club in England

Coordinates: 51°56′06″N 1°16′24″E

- Full name: Harwich & Parkeston Football Club
- Nickname: The Shrimpers
- Founded: 1875
- Ground: Royal Oak, Harwich
- Chairman: Tony Armstrong & Colin Rogers
- Manager: Matt Carmichael & Sean Tynan
- League: Essex Senior League
- 2025–26: Essex Senior League, 13th of 20
Home colours	Away colours

Harwich & Parkeston Football Club is a football club based in Harwich, Essex, England. The club are currently members of the Essex Senior League and play at the Royal Oak ground.

== History ==
The club was established in 1875, and reached their first cup final in 1891, losing to Clapton in the final of the Essex Senior Cup. In 1892 the club played host to Antwerp in the first match between an English team and a European team in England, with Harwich winning 11–0. In 1893 the club travelled to play Sparta Rotterdam winning 8–0. They were founder members of the North Essex League in 1895, winning the inaugural Division One title without losing a match. They retained the Division One title the following season, and were champions again in 1898–99, as well as winning the Essex Senior Cup, beating Leytonstone in the final. They also reached the final of the FA Amateur Cup, losing 1–0 to Stockton. The following season they were expelled from the competition after refusing to play extra time away to West Croydon.

Harwich were founder members of the South East Anglian League in 1903 and were runners-up in its first season. However, they finished bottom of the league the following season. They played in the league until 1910, but also joined the Essex & Suffolk Border League, which they won in 1908–09, 1913–14, 1920–21, 1921–22, 1922–23, 1928–29, 1931–32, 1932–33 and 1933–34. The club also entered a team into the Ipswich & District League, winning the Senior Division in 1922–23. In 1934–35 the club reached the first round of the FA Cup for the first time but lost 3–0 at Bristol Rovers. In 1935 the club became founder members of the Eastern Counties League, and shared the first championship with Lowestoft Town. The following season they reached the FA Cup first round again, losing 5–1 at Bournemouth & Boscombe Athletic.

In 1937 Harwich left the Eastern Counties League to play in the Essex County League, which they won at the first attempt, but returned after a single season as the league folded. They reached the final of the Amateur Cup again in 1953, but lost 6–0 to Pegasus at Wembley Stadium in front of a crowd of 100,000. The following season they played in the FA Cup first round again, but lost 3–2 at home to Headington United. The first round was also reached again in 1961–62 and 1963–64, but the club suffered heavy defeats on both occasions, losing 5–1 at Torquay United and 8–2 at Crystal Palace.

In 1964 Harwich joined Division Two of the Athenian League. Champions in their first season, they were promoted to Division One. After finishing runners-up the following season, the club were promoted to the Premier Division. They remained at that level until 1973, when they switched to Division Two of the Isthmian League. In 1976–77 they reached the first round of the FA Cup again, where they lost 3–0 at home to Enfield in a replay after a 0–0 draw; the league season saw them finish third in Division Two, the club's highest-ever finish. Division Two was renamed Division One for the 1977–78 season and the club were relegated to Division Two in 1979–80. After finishing bottom of Division Two in 1982–83 they dropped into the Athenian League for one season, before returning to the Eastern Counties League. The club won the League Cup in 1996–97.

In 2002–03 Harwich were relegated to Division One of the Eastern Counties League, but finished runners-up in their first season to make an immediate return. They remained in the Premier Division until resigning on 9 February 2010, and subsequently joining the Premier Division of the Essex & Suffolk Border League for the 2010–11 season. In 2014 the club disbanded its reserve team, and dropped into Division One of the Border League for the 2014–15 season. Despite only finishing tenth in 2017–18, the club were promoted to the new Division One South of the Eastern Counties League. They were transferred to Division One North for the 2022–23 season, and went on to finish fourth in the division, qualifying for the promotion play-offs. After beating Framlingham Town 5–4 on penalties in the semi-finals (after a 1–1 draw), the club were beaten 4–0 in the final by Downham Town. In 2024–25 they finished third in the division, going on to defeat Framlingham Town 2–0 in the play-off semi-finals and then won the final against Stanway Pegasus on penalties to earn promotion to the Essex Senior League.

== Ground ==
The club initially played at Barrack Field, later moving to the Phoenix Ground on the coast. In 1898 they moved to their current home, the Royal Oak, named after the nearby pub. Initially secured on a lease agreement, the ground was purchased by the club in 1922. During World War II the ground was used as an army base.

The current grandstand was built in 1948 and opened by FA Secretary Stanley Rous.

== Honours ==
- Athenian League
  - Division Two champions 1964–65
  - Division Two Cup winners 1964–65
- Eastern Counties League
  - Champions 1935–36 (joint)
  - League Cup winners 1935–36, 1936–37, 1996–97
- Essex County League
  - Champions 1937–38
- North Essex League
  - Division One champions 1895–96, 1896–97, 1898–99
- Colchester & District League
  - Division One champions 1908–09
- Essex & Suffolk Border League
  - Senior Division champions 1913–14, 1920–21, 1921–22, 1922–23, 1928–29, 1931–32, 1932–33, 1933–34
  - League Cup winners 2011–12, 2013–14
- Ipswich & District League
  - Senior Division champions 1922–23
- Essex Senior Cup
  - Winners 1898–99, 1936–37
- Essex Senior Trophy
  - Winners 1989–90
- East Anglian Cup
  - Winners 1932–33, 1933–34
- Amateur Football Alliance Senior Cup
  - Winners 1934–35, 1935–36, 1936–37

== Records ==
- Best FA Cup performance: First round, 1934–35, 1936–37, 1953–54, 1961–62, 1963–64, 1976–77
- Best FA Trophy performance: Third round, 1975–76
- Best FA Vase performance: Quarter-finals, 1990–91
- Record attendance: 5,649 vs Romford. FA Amateur Cup quarter-final
