= Norwich CBS F.C. =

Football club based in Norwich, England

Coordinates: 52.6428°N 1.2209°E

Norwich CBS
- Full name: Norwich CBS Football Club
- Founded: 1888
- Dissolved: 2024
- Ground: Football Development Centre, Bowthorpe
Home colours	Away colours

Norwich CBS Football Club was a football club based in Norwich, England. They were last members of the Eastern Counties League Division One North and played at the Football Development Centre in Bowthorpe until April 2024. On 12 May 2024 the club announced that they would be folding due to issues with finding a new ground.

== History ==
The club was formed in 1888 as the works team of Norwich Union. They became members of the Norwich & District Business House League and were Division One champions in 1926–27, 1946–47 and 1947–48. The club then moved up to the East Anglian League, entering Division One in 1955. When the league merged with the Norfolk & Suffolk League to form the Anglian Combination in 1964, the club became members of Section A of the new league.

Norwich Union were Premier Division runners-up in 1987–88, before winning the division the following season. After winning the Norfolk Junior Cup in 1998–99, they were Division Two champions in 1999–2000. In 2002–03 the club were promoted back to the Premier Division. After becoming AFC Norwich in 2008, in 2009 they were renamed Spixworth after relocating to the village. They won the league's Mummery Cup in 2010–11 and 2014–15, and were runners-up in the Premier Division in 2012–13, 2013–14 and 2015–16. In 2016–17 the club won the Premier Division title, earning promotion to Division One of the Eastern Counties League. They were then renamed Norwich CBS after relocating to Bowthorpe.

== Ground ==
The club played at Pinebanks in Thorpe St Andrew until 2008. After a year at Dussindale, the club moved to Crotstwick Lane in Spixworth in 2009. In 2017 Spixworth Parish Council informed the club that it was no longer able to use the ground, resulting in them relocating to the Football Development Centre in Bowthorpe.

== Honours ==
- Anglian Combination
  - Premier Division champions 1988–89, 2016–17
  - Division Two champions 1999–2000
  - Mummery Cup winners 2010–11, 2014–15
- Norwich & District Business House League
  - Champions 1926–27, 1946–47, 1947–48
- Norfolk Junior Cup
  - Winners 1998–99

== Records ==
- Best FA Cup performance: Extra preliminary round, 2019–20
- Best FA Vase performance: Fourth round, 2017–18
