= Benfleet F.C. =

Association football club in England

Coordinates: 51.57898°N 0.56405°E

Benfleet
- Full name: Benfleet Football Club
- Founded: 1922
- Ground: Woodside Stadium, South Benfleet
- Chairman: Dan Wright
- Manager: Lee Scott
- League: Essex Senior League
- 2024–25: Essex Senior League, 16th of 20
Home colours	Away colours

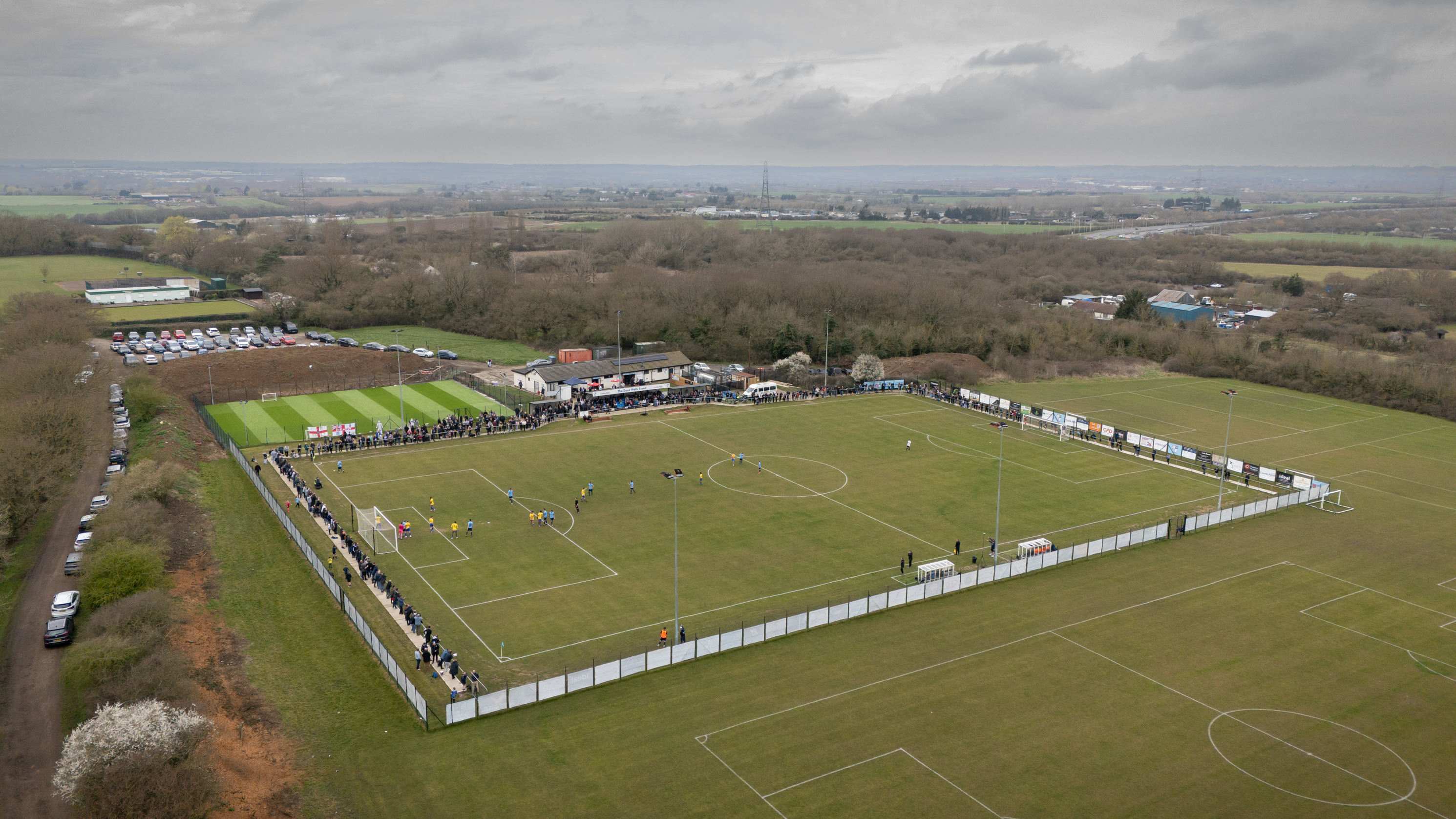
Woodside Stadium

Benfleet Football Club is a football club based in South Benfleet, Essex, England. They are currently members of the Essex Senior League and play at the Woodside Stadium.

== History ==
The club was established in 1922, and were initially named Benfleet United. After merging with Parkfields Athletic, they were renamed Benfleet Rangers. The club played in the Southend & District League and won the Essex Junior Cup in 1967–68. After winning the league title in 1971–72, the club joined the Essex Olympian League and dropped the Rangers part of the name. They were runners-up in their first two seasons in the league. In 1981 the league gained a second division, with Benfleet becoming members of Division One. They were league runners-up again in 1981–82, before the league was renamed the Essex Intermediate League in 1986. The club were subsequently champions and Essex Intermediate Cup winners in 1988–89.

In 1995–96 Benfleet finished second-from-bottom of Division One and were relegated to Division Two. In 1997, the club considered joining the Essex Senior League, however the cost of enclosing the club's Woodside Park ground proved too prohibitive. They won the Essex Premier Cup in 2002–03. The league reverted to its original name in 2005, and the club were Division Two champions in 2006–07, earning promotion to the renamed Premier Division. After three seasons in the Premier Division, they were relegated back to Division One at the end of the 2009–10 season. The 2013–14 season ended with them being relegated to Division Two, and the club resigned from the league midway through the following season.

Benfleet then re-entered the Essex Olympian League in Division Three for the 2015–16 season, going on to win the division and secure promotion to Division Two. At the end of the 2017–18 season the club successfully applied for promotion to the new Division One South of the Eastern Counties League, a three-division jump. The 2023–24 season saw Benfleet win the Division One South title, earning promotion to the Essex Senior League.

== Ground ==
The club originally played at the recreation ground in South Benfleet, which was located on a former army camp behind the shops on the High Street. There were initially no facilities and players had to change in the public toilets at the recreation ground entrance. A pavilion was subsequently built at the end of Brook Road, with Benfleet playing on the pitch opposite it. However, when the club requested permission to build a clubhouse, local residents objected. As a result, they relocated to the Woodside ground on Manor Road.

When they moved up to the Eastern Counties League, the first team began a groundshare at Canvey Island's Park Lane due to the Woodside ground not meeting the required standards, while the remainder of the club's teams remained at Woodside Park in Benfleet. Following upgrade work, the first team returned to Woodside for the start of the 2024–25 season.

== Honours ==
- Eastern Counties League
  - Division One South champions 2023–24
- Essex Olympian League
  - Champions 1988–89
  - Division Two champions 2006–07
  - Division Three champions 2015–16
  - Senior Cup winners 1983–84
  - Senior Challenge Cup winners 1974–75 (shared), 1982–83, 1984–85, 1989–90 (shared)
  - Denny King Memorial Cup winners 2001–02, 2002–03
- Southend & District League
  - Champions 1971–72
- Essex Premier Cup
  - Winners 2002–03
- Essex Intermediate Cup
  - Winners 1988–89
- Essex Junior Cup
  - Winners 1967–68

== Records ==
- Best FA Cup performance: Preliminary round, 2024–25
- Best FA Vase performance: Fourth round, 2025–26

== See also ==
- Benfleet F.C. players
