= 2024–25 Southern Counties East Football League =

The 2024–25 Southern Counties East Football League season is the 59th in the history of the Southern Counties East Football League, and the ninth year the competition will have two divisions, the Premier Division and Division One, at levels 9 and 10 of the English football league system. It is also known as Presence & Co. Southern Counties East League for sponsorship reasons.

The provisional club allocations for steps 5 and 6 were announced by The Football Association on 17 May 2024.

== Premier Division ==
Southern Counties East Football League Premier Division
- Season: 2024–25
- Champions: Faversham Town
- Promoted: Faversham Town; VCD Athletic
- Relegated: Lydd Town; Lordswood
- Top goalscorer: Charlie Clover (25)

The Premier Division comprised eighteen teams from the previous season, along with two new clubs after Deal Town and Erith Town were promoted to the Isthmian League South East Division and Welling Town were relegated to Division One.

The two clubs joining the division were:

- Erith & Belvedere - Relegated from Isthmian League South East Division
- Larkfield & New Hythe Wanderers - Promoted from Division One

=== Premier Division table ===
Pos	Team	Pld	W	D	L	GF	GA	GD	Pts	Promotion, qualification or relegation
1	Faversham Town (C, P)	38	26	10	2	96	27	+69	88	Promotion to the Isthmian League
2	VCD Athletic (O, P)	38	24	10	4	81	36	+45	81 (Note: VCD Athletic were deducted 1 point due to playing an ineligible player during their 5-5 Premier Division draw with Holmesdale.)	Qualification for the play-offs
3	Whitstable Town	38	23	6	9	83	47	+36	75	Qualification for the play-offs
4	Fisher	38	19	10	9	64	40	+24	67	Qualification for the play-offs
5	Punjab United	38	20	7	11	65	57	+8	67	Qualification for the play-offs
6	Rusthall	38	18	10	10	77	62	+15	64	
7	Erith & Belvedere	38	13	11	14	49	56	−7	50	
8	Sutton Athletic	38	13	11	14	51	60	−9	50	
9	Tunbridge Wells	38	14	8	16	52	63	−11	50	
10	Larkfield & New Hythe Wanderers	38	13	10	15	66	61	+5	49	
11	Corinthian	38	12	12	14	69	65	+4	48	
12	Bearsted	38	14	6	18	56	63	−7	48	
13	Holmesdale	38	13	9	16	66	87	−21	48	
14	Glebe	38	12	9	17	60	70	−10	45	
15	Kennington	38	10	11	17	43	64	−21	41	
16	Stansfeld	38	12	5	21	50	73	−23	41	
17	Hollands & Blair	38	11	7	20	59	73	−14	40	
18	Snodland Town	38	9	8	21	51	80	−29	35	
19	Lydd Town (R)	38	11	5	22	52	74	−22	34 (Note: Lydd Town were deducted 4 points from their Premier Division playing record after they were given a league charge of playing an ineligible player during seven Premier Division matches in January and February 2025)	Relegation to Division One
20	Lordswood (R)	38	7	7	24	50	82	−32	28	Relegation to Division One

Source: The FA Full-Time
Rules for classification: 1) points; 2) goal difference; 3) number of goals scored; 4) number of matches won; 5) head-to-head results
(C) Champions; (O) Play-off winners; (P) Promoted; (R) Relegated

=== Play-offs ===
Semi-finals
2	VCD Athletic	2
5	Punjab United	0
3	Whitstable Town	1 (3)
4	Fisher	1 (4)

Final
2	VCD Athletic	2
4	Fisher	1

==== Semifinals ====
29 April 2025	VCD Athletic	2–0	Punjab United	Crayford
19:45 GMT	Dymond 9'; Fenn 28'	Report		Stadium: The Oakwood; Attendance: 375

29 April 2025	Whitstable Town	1–1 (3–4 p)	Fisher	Whitstable
19:45 GMT	Goal	Report	Clarke 90'	Stadium: The Belmont Ground; Attendance: 762

==== Final ====
5 May 2025	VCD Athletic	2–1	Fisher	Crayford
15:00 GMT	Bird 6'; Bradshaw 90'	Report	Jumo 39'	Stadium: The Oakwood; Attendance: 720; Referee: Rhys Jeffery

=== Results table ===
Home \ Away	BEA	COR	ERI	FAV	FIS	GLB	H&B	HOL	KEN	LAR	LOR	LYD	PUN	RUS	SNT	STA	SUT	TUN	VCD	WHI
Bearsted	—	3–2	0–0	1–5	0–1	1–1	5–2	5–2	5–0	1–1	2–1	2–1	1–2	2–4	2–0	1–1	2–1	1–2	1–2	0–2
Corinthian	2–0	—	2–1	2–3	1–2	2–2	1–1	0–1	1–1	1–1	1–2	3–0	1–1	2–2	4–1	2–1	0–1	2–3	1–1	1–2
Erith & Belvedere	3–0	2–2	—	2–2	2–1	1–0	1–0	1–3	1–3	2–2	1–1	2–0	0–1	1–1	3–2	2–1	2–2	2–3	0–0	0–1
Faversham Town	2–1	2–2	4–0	—	0–0	4–0	2–1	5–0	2–2	0–1	6–0	8–1	2–0	2–0	3–1	3–1	3–0	4–0	1–1	4–3
Fisher	2–0	2–2	2–0	1–3	—	3–0	3–3	0–1	1–1	4–2	3–1	4–1	0–1	2–1	2–0	3–0	1–0	3–1	1–1	1–2
Glebe	3–0	2–1		0–0	1–4	—	4–0	2–1	2–3	1–3	3–1	0–5	4–0	1–1	3–0	1–3	2–2	1–1	2–3	2–1
Hollands & Blair	0–2	2–3	0–0	0–4	2–3	1–1	—	2–2	0–1	1–0	3–3	3–1	3–0	2–0	5–1	3–2	0–1	1–4	0–5	2–4
Holmesdale	2–1	4–2	2–1	1–1	0–2	2–3	0–3	—	2–2	1–1	2–1	4–1	1–3	1–4	3–3	2–1	1–2	1–5	5–5	2–2
Kennington	0–3	2–1	0–1	1–3	0–0	1–0	1–2	1–1	—	2–1	1–3	0–1	1–1	2–1	2–1	2–0	2–2	0–2	2–1	0–1
Larkfield & New Hythe Wanderers	4–1	3–2	0–2	1–2	2–2	2–0	1–0	3–4	2–1	—	2–2	2–1	0–1	2–3	2–3	4–0	2–1	0–1	0–1	1–2
Lordswood	1–2	1–2	1–2	0–5	4–1	2–1	2–1	1–2	2–2	3–3	—	4–0	2–3	3–4	0–3	0–3	0–1	1–2	0–2	0–3
Lydd Town	4–0	2–1	1–1	0–0	1–0	2–2	1–2	3–4	2–2	2–0	1–2	—	4–1	0–2	1–4	0–2	3–0	3–1	1–0	1–3
Punjab United	1–2	3–0	2–1	0–3	2–4	1–0	3–2	3–2	1–0	1–1	1–1	2–1	—	1–2	5–0	0–1	1–1	2–1	3–2	1–4
Rusthall	1–1	3–4	1–3	0–0	0–3	3–1	2–1	2–0	3–0	1–2	2–0	2–1	4–3	—	4–1	1–0	5–0	1–1	3–3	0–6
Snodland Town	1–0	1–3	2–2	0–1	2–1	0–1	1–1	2–0	4–1	2–2	2–1	1–2	1–1	0–3	—	4–1	1–1	1–2	0–2	1–1
Stansfeld	1–3	1–3	3–2	0–0	1–1	1–2	3–2	1–3	2–1	1–4	2–1	4–2	1–2	6–6	1–1	—	0–2	2–1	0–1	1–0
Sutton Athletic	2–2	0–3	0–1	0–2	0–1	3–6	2–1	4–1	0–0	3–1	0–0	2–0	1–5	1–1	5–1	1–0	—	2–0	0–5	3–3
Tunbridge Wells	1–2	1–2	2–0	0–1	0–0	2–2	0–3	2–1	2–1	3–3	2–1	1–1	0–3	1–1	3–1	1–2	0–4	—	0–0	0–2
VCD Athletic	1–0	2–2	4–1	4–1	2–0	4–0	2–1	1–1	4–2	2–1	4–1	1–0	2–2	2–0	3–1	4–0	1–0	2–1	—	0–2
Whitstable Town	2–1	3–3	3–0	0–3	0–0	3–2	2–3	6–1	3–0	1–4	2–1	2–1	1–2	1–3	3–1	2–0	1–1	4–0	0–1	—

Source: FA Full-Time Grid
Legend: Blue = home team win; Yellow = draw; Red = away team win.
For upcoming matches, an "a" indicates there is an article about the rivalry between the two participants.

=== Stadia and locations ===
Locations of the Premier Division clubs (Greater London)
Locations of the Premier Division clubs (Kent)

Club	Location	Stadium	Capacity
Bearsted	Otham	Honey Lane	1,000
Corinthian	Longfield	Gay Dawn Farm	2,000
Erith & Belvedere	Welling	Park View Road (groundshare with Welling United)	4,000
Faversham Town	Faversham	Salters Lane	2,000
Fisher	Rotherhithe	St Paul's Sports Ground	2,500
Glebe	Chislehurst	Foxbury Avenue	1,200
Hollands & Blair	Gillingham	Star Meadow	1,000
Holmesdale	Bromley	Oakley Road	
Kennington	Kennington	The Homelands (groundshare with Ashford United)	3,200
Larkfield & New Hythe Wanderers	Larkfield	Larkfield & New Hythe Sports Club	3,000
Lordswood	Lordswoood	Martyn Grove	600
Lydd Town	Lydd	The Lindsey Field	1,000
Punjab United	Gravesend	Elite Venue	600
Rusthall	Rusthall	The Jockey Farm Stadium	1,500
Snodland Town	Snodland	Potyns Sports Ground	1,000
Stansfeld	Eltham	Badgers Sports Ground (groundshare with Cray Valley Paper Mills)	1,550
Sutton Athletic	Hextable	Lower Road	
Tunbridge Wells	Royal Tunbridge Wells	Culverden Stadium	3,750
VCD Athletic	Crayford	The Oakwood	1,180
Whitstable Town	Whitstable	The Belmont Ground	3,000

== Division One ==
Southern Counties East Football League Division One
- Season: 2024–25
- Champions: Faversham Strike Force
- Promoted: Faversham Strike Force; Soul Tower Hamlets
- Top goalscorer: Mack Reilly (19)

Division One consisted of eighteen teams, increased from sixteen the previous season. Teams that left Division One from the previous season were AFC Whyteleafe and Larkfield & New Hythe Wanderers who were promoted to the Combined Counties Premier Division South and SCEFL Premier Division respectively.

The four new teams that joined the division were:

- Clapton Community - Transferred from Eastern Counties League Division One South
- Halls Athletic - Promoted from Kent County League
- Soul Tower Hamlets - Transferred from Eastern Counties League Division One South
- Welling Town - Relegated from Premier Division

Clapton were initially transferred across from the Eastern Counties League Division One South, before withdrawing from the league on 18 June 2024, resulting in a reprieve for Greenways. on 31 March 2025 Canterbury City have requested relegation from the South Counties East Football League Division One due to issues with finding a groundshare.

=== Division One table ===
Pos	Team	Pld	W	D	L	GF	GA	GD	Pts	Promotion, qualification or relegation
1	Faversham Strike Force (C, P)	34	17	13	4	62	35	+27	64	Promotion to the Premier Division
2	Soul Tower Hamlets (O, P)	34	18	10	6	58	43	+15	64	Qualification for the play-offs
3	Forest Hill Park (SE Dons)	34	17	11	6	56	38	+18	62	Qualification for the play-offs
4	Croydon	34	17	9	8	58	35	+23	60	Qualification for the play-offs
5	Sheppey Sports	34	17	7	10	76	54	+22	58	Qualification for the play-offs
6	Canterbury City (R)	34	15	10	9	59	40	+19	55	Voluntarily relegated to the Kent County League
7	Clapton Community	34	15	7	12	57	51	+6	52	Transfer to the Eastern Counties League Division One South
8	Rochester United	34	17	6	11	64	41	+23	51 (Note: Rochester United were deducted 6 points.)	
9	Staplehurst Monarchs	34	15	5	14	46	42	+4	50	
10	Bridon Ropes	34	13	10	11	43	43	0	49	
11	Lewisham Borough	34	13	8	13	45	38	+7	47	
12	FC Elmstead	34	13	8	13	52	56	−4	47	
13	Sporting Club Thamesmead	34	10	15	9	39	36	+3	45	
14	Tooting Bec	34	11	10	13	51	54	−3	43	
15	Halls Athletic	34	10	5	19	42	65	−23	35	
16	Greenways	34	7	5	22	45	76	−31	26	Reprived from relegation
17	Welling Town	34	5	6	23	34	81	−47	21	Reprived from relegation
18	Meridian VP (R)	34	2	3	29	18	77	−59	9	Relegation to the Kent County League

Source: The FA Full-Time
Rules for classification: 1) points; 2) goal difference; 3) number of goals scored; 4) number of matches won; 5) head-to-head results
(C) Champions; (O) Play-off winners; (P) Promoted; (R) Relegated

=== Play-offs ===
Semi-finals
2	Soul Tower Hamlets	5
5	Sheppey Sports	0
3	Forest Hill Park (SE Dons)	0 (4)
4	Croydon	0 (2)

Final
2	Soul Tower Hamlets	0 (5)
3	Forest Hill Park (SE Dons)	0 (4)

==== Semifinals ====
30 April 2025	Soul Tower Hamlets	5–0	Sheppey Sports	Mile End
19:45 GMT	Bell 23'; Woods 27'; Artmeladze 47', 52', 64'	Report		Stadium: Mile End Stadium; Attendance: 141

30 April 2025	Forest Hill Park (SE Dons)	0–0 (4–2 p)	Croydon	Catford
19:45 GMT		Report		Stadium: Ladywell Arena; Attendance: 371

==== Final ====
3 May 2025	Soul Tower Hamlets	0–0 (5–4 p)	Forest Hill Park (SE Dons)	Fawkham
15:00 GMT		Report		Stadium: Gay Dawn; Attendance: 491

=== Results table ===
Home \ Away	BRI	CAN	CLC	CRO	FAV	ELM	FHP (FHP)	GRE	HAL	LEW	MER	ROC	SCT	SHE	STH	STM	TOO	WEL
Bridon Ropes	—	0–0	3–2	3–0	1–2	0–4	2–0	1–0	0–0	3–0	0–0	2–4	2–1	0–1	1–2	1–0	0–0	5–2
Canterbury City	1–1	—	2–0	1–1	2–2	0–2	0–2	4–2	3–0	0–1	2–1	2–1	0–1	3–2	1–2	0–3	3–1	3–0
Clapton Community	3–0	0–0	—	1–1	0–3	1–0	1–1	1–0	6–1	2–1	1–0	2–1	0–0	1–3	1–1	2–1	2–4	3–1
Croydon	1–0	1–1	4–3	—	1–2	1–2	5–0	1–0	2–1	0–0	8–0	2–1	1–0	4–1	4–1	1–0	0–1	1–1
Faversham Strike Force	0–0	0–0	3–2	1–1	—	0–0	2–2	3–3	3–0	3–3	5–1	1–2	2–1	3–3	0–0	3–0	1–1	5–0
FC Elmstead	1–2	0–3	2–2	2–0	0–2	—	2–1	2–2	2–1	1–0	2–0	1–6	1–1	1–2	2–1	0–1	3–4	4–1
Forest Hill Park (SE Dons)	1–1	1–0	2–1	1–0	0–1	4–1	—	1–1	2–0	1–0	2–1	1–1	3–1	3–1	1–1	2–2	1–1	3–0
Greenways	3–1	1–6	1–3	5–2	2–3	1–2	1–1	—	0–1	0–0	0–1	0–2	1–2	2–1	2–4	1–3	1–5	3–2
Halls Athletic	1–2	0–2	0–4	0–3	3–1	3–1	3–5	0–2	—	1–2	5–0	2–0	1–1	1–2	1–0	1–0	1–1	1–2
Lewisham Borough	1–1	4–0	0–1	2–1	1–3	1–1	0–1	2–0	2–0	—	5–0	2–1	1–2	0–2	1–1	1–2	3–0	2–1
Meridian VP	1–2	0–4	0–1	0–1	0–1	0–1	0–3	2–3	0–2	2–2	—	0–2	0–3	0–1	0–1	2–1	1–2	0–1
Rochester United	3–1	3–4	2–0	1–1	3–0	3–3	1–2	4–0	0–0	2–0	3–0	—	1–0	4–2	0–3	0–2	2–0	2–0
Sporting Club Thamesmead	1–1	1–0	1–2	1–2	0–0	2–1	1–2	2–0	1–1	1–0	2–2	0–0	—	2–2	0–0	2–2	0–0	3–2
Sheppey Sports	2–2	2–4	5–1	1–2	2–0	4–1	1–1	5–2	3–4	0–2	3–1	3–1	3–3	—	1–0	5–0	2–2	3–1
Soul Tower Hamlets	2–1	2–2	2–1	1–3	0–0	4–3	2–1	3–1	4–1	1–0	3–2	2–2	2–1	1–1	—	1–1	3–2	1–0
Staplehurst Monarchs	0–2	2–2	1–0	0–2	0–2	1–2	2–1	2–0	2–1	1–2	2–0	3–1	1–1	1–0	1–2	—	0–0	1–2
Tooting Bec	4–0	1–1	2–4	0–0	0–1	2–2	0–0	3–1	5–1	3–4	2–1	0–2	0–1	0–4	2–1	0–2	—	2–1
Welling Town	0–2	0–3	3–3	1–1	1–4	0–0	2–4	1–4	2–4	0–0	1–0	0–3	0–0	1–3	3–4	0–3	2–1	—

Source: FA Full-Time Grid
Legend: Blue = home team win; Yellow = draw; Red = away team win.
For upcoming matches, an "a" indicates there is an article about the rivalry between the two participants.

=== Stadia and locations ===
Locations of the Division One clubs (Greater London)
Locations of the Division One clubs (Kent)

Club	Location	Stadium	Capacity
Bridon Ropes	Charlton	Meridian Sports & Social Club	
Canterbury City	Canterbury	Hartsdown Park (groundshare with Margate)	3,000
Clapton Community	Forest Gate	The Old Spotted Dog Ground	2,000
Croydon	Croydon	Croydon Arena	8,000
Faversham Strike Force	Faversham	Salters Lane (groundshare with Faversham Town)	2,000
FC Elmstead	Hextable	Lower Road (groundshare with Sutton Athletic)	
Forest Hill Park (SE Dons)	Catford	Ladywell Arena (groundshare with Lewisham Borough)	
Greenways	Gravesend	Rochester United Sports Ground (groundshare with Rochester United)	1,000
Halls Athletic	Dartford	Erith Leisure Center	
Lewisham Borough	Catford	Ladywell Arena	
Meridian VP	Charlton	Meridian Sports & Social Club	
Rochester United	Strood	Rochester United Sports Ground	1,000
Sheppey Sports	Isle of Sheppey	Holm Park (groundshare with Sheppey United)	1,530
Soul Tower Hamlets	London Borough of Tower Hamlets	Mile End Stadium (groundshare with Sporting Bengal United)	3,000
Sporting Club Thamesmead	Thamesmead	Bayliss Avenue (groundshare with Erith Town)	800
Staplehurst Monarchs	Staplehurst	Jubilee Sports Ground	1,000
Tooting Bec	Tooting Bec	High Road (groundshare with Chipstead)	2,000
Welling Town	Welling	Erith Leisure Center	

== League Challenge Cup ==
The 2024–25 SCEFL Challenge Cup was contested by all 38 clubs from both the Premier and First divisions (indicated by '(PD)' and '(FD)' respectively in the results listings below).

Defending champions Erith Town were unable to defend their title following their promotion to the Isthmian League South East Division.

=== First round ===
All 38 clubs across the two divisions were entered into the first-round draw where there would be just six ties.

Tie	Home team (tier)	Score	Away team (tier)
1	Canterbury City (FD)	2–1	Larkfield & New Hythe Wanderers (PD)
2	Lydd Town (PD)	4–0	Sheppey Sports (FD)
3	Clapton Community (FD)	1–3	Bridon Ropes (FD)
4	Forest Hill Park (FD)	0–0 (3–2 p)	Tunbridge Wells (PD)
5	Tooting Bec (FD)	3–3 (4–5 p)	Greenways (FD)
6	Fisher (PD)	4–0	FC Elmstead (FD)

=== Second round ===
The second round saw the remaining 26 teams face the six winners from the previous round.

Tie	Home team (tier)	Score	Away team (tier)
1	Kennington (PD)	1–1 (8–7 p)	Hollands & Blair (PD)
2	Punjab United (PD)	4–1	SC Thamesmead (FD)
3	Soul Tower Hamlets (FD)	1–3	Glebe (PD)
4	Sutton Athletic (PD)	2–1	Stansfeld (PD)
5	Bearsted (PD)	1–2	Lordswood (PD)
6	Faversham Town (PD)	2–0	Faversham Strike Force (FD)
7	Greenways (FD)	2–0	Fisher (PD)
8	Rusthall (PD)	8–0	Meridian VP (FD)

Tie	Home team (tier)	Score	Away team (tier)
9	Snodland Town (PD)	2–0	Canterbury City (FD)
10	Staplehurst Monarchs (FD)	1–0	Whitstable Town (PD)
11	Bridon Ropes (FD)	0–0 (5–6 p)	Croydon (FD)
12	Erith & Belvedere (PD)	2–1	Lewisham Borough (FD)
13	Forest Hill Park (FD)	2–1	Welling Town (FD)
14	Halls Athletic (FD)	1–2	Holmesdale (PD)
15	Lydd Town (PD)	0–8	Rochester United (FD)
16	VCD Athletic (PD)	2–1	Corinthian (PD)

=== Third round ===
Tie	Home team (tier)	Score	Away team (tier)
1	Lordswood (PD)	0–2	Snodland Town (PD)
2	Kennington (PD)	3–5	Rochester United (FD)
3	Faversham Town (PD)	4–1	Staplehurst Monarchs (FD)
4	Holmesdale (PD)	0–0 (6–5 p)	Rusthall (PD)
5	Greenways (FD)	1–6	Sutton Athletic (PD)
6	Croydon (FD)	0–1	Punjab United (PD)
7	Glebe (PD)	1–2	VCD Athletic (PD)
8	Erith & Belvedere (PD)	0–2	Forest Hill Park (FD)

=== Quarter-finals ===
Tie	Home team (tier)	Score	Away team (tier)
1	Snodland Town (PD)	3–2	Faversham Town (PD)
2	Rochester United (FD)	1–2	Punjab United (PD)
3	Sutton Athletic (PD)	2–1	VCD Athletic (PD)
4	Forest Hill Park (FD)	2–1	Holmesdale (PD)

=== Semi-finals ===
Tie	Home team (tier)	Score	Away team (tier)
1	Forest Hill Park (FD)	2–1	Punjab United (PD)
2	Snodland Town (PD)	3–1	Sutton Athletic (PD)

=== Final ===
18 April 2025	Forest Hill Park (FD)	0–5	Snodland Town (PD)	Chislehurst
13:00 BST		Report	Oldfield 5', 21'; Sheringham 40'; Turner-Bernard 75', 82'	Stadium: Flamingo Park; Attendance: 1,531

== Division One Cup ==
The 2024–25 SCEFL Division One Cup, a supplementary competition for teams in Division One, was contested by the eighteen clubs of the division. The competition was organised on a knock-out tie basis.

=== First round ===
Four clubs participated in two first round ties, with byes for the other 14 clubs.

Tie	Home team	Score	Away team
1	Bridon Ropes	2–3	Soul Tower Hamlets
2	Greenways	0–6	FC Elmstead

=== Second round ===
Sixteen clubs competed in eight second round ties.

Tie	Home team	Score	Away team
1	Canterbury City	4–1	Staplehurst Monarchs
2	Sheppey Sports	1–1 (2–4 p)	Faversham Strike Force
3	FC Elmstead	0–1	Rochester United
4	Clapton Community	4–0	Sporting Club Thamesmead
5	Forest Hill Park	2–0	Tooting Bec
6	Soul Tower Hamlets	1–1 (2–3 p)	Meridian VP
7	Croydon	0–0 (2–3 p)	Lewisham Borough
8	Halls Athletic	5–0	Welling Town

=== Quarter-finals ===
Tie	Home team	Score	Away team
1	Faversham Strike Force	2–2 (4–3 p)	Canterbury City
2	Clapton Community	2–0	Halls Athletic
3	Lewisham Borough	0–2	Forest Hill Park
4	Meridian VP	1–0	Rochester United

=== Semi-finals ===
Tie	Home team	Score	Away team
1	Clapton Community	2–1	Meridian VP
2	Forest Hill Park	3–1	Faversham Strike Force

=== Final ===
10 May 2025	Clapton Community	3 – 1	Forest Hill Park	Dagenham
14:00 BST	Joel Akuwudike 4'; Fred Taylor 7'; Fred Taylor 44'	Report	Georgi Steeds 66' (pen)	Stadium: Mayesbrook Park (Barking F.C.); Attendance: 1,242

sources:

- Matches: "SCEFL Division One Cup: 2024–25". SCEFL.
