= SE Dons F.C. =

Association football club in England

South East Dons
- Full name: South East Dons Football Club
- Nickname: SE Dons
- Founded: 2014
- Ground: Old Road, Bexleyheath
- Owner: Don Strapzy
- Chairman: Andy Ansah
- Manager: Antonio Gonnella
- League: Southern Counties East League Premier Division
- 2025–26: Southern Counties East League Division One, 2nd of 18 (promoted via play-offs)
- Website: https://www.sedons.com/

South East Dons Football Club are an association football club based in south-east London, England. Founded by rapper Don Strapzy and friends, the club formerly competed in Sunday league football before merging with Forest Hill Park in 2024 to compete in non-league. They are members of the Southern Counties East League Premier Division and play at the Old Road Stadium in Bexleyheath.

SE Dons is considered one of the most popular non-league clubs worldwide with high support on social media. In their first season in non-league they lost three finals: the Southern Counties East League Division One play-off final against Soul Tower Hamlets, the Division One Cup against Clapton, and the Challenge Cup against Snodland Town. In their second season, their first as SE Dons, they gained promotion to the Premier Division after a 4–2 play-off final win against Rochester United.

== History ==
South East Dons was formed in 2014 by rapper Andrew McHugh, better known as Don Strapzy, and friends. Since then SE Dons have won the Orpington and Bromley District Sunday League twice, in 2021 and 2022. The club chairman is actor and former footballer Andy Ansah. His son, former Arsenal Academy striker Zak Ansah, plays for SE Dons.

In June 2024 the club announced on its official X account that they were joining non-league football. Two days later, fellow Lewisham outfit Forest Hill Park announced on its official X account that they had formed a partnership with SE Dons. It was confirmed that the name 'Forest Hill Park' would be kept for all footballing competitions in the 2024–25 season, with all names being changed to 'SE Dons' from the 2025–26 season onwards.

The club announced their first manager in non-league as Marc Dacey. Dacey was later sacked halfway through the season and replaced by Antonio Gonnella.

== Stadium ==
Following the merger with Forest Hill Park, the club played their home games at the Ladywell Arena for one season.

On 18 June 2026 it was announced that the club will be playing their home fixtures at Old Road Stadium in Bexleyheath after VCD Athletic's lease was not renewed. It is less than 250 metres from the ground of fellow SCEFL side, Phoenix Sports.

== Records ==
- Best FA Cup performance: Fourth qualifying round, 2026–27
- Best FA Vase performance: Second round, 2026–27

== Honours ==
As SE Dons Sunday league team

- Orpington and Bromley District Sunday Football League
  - Champions 2021, 2022
- Plumstead Cup
  - Winners 2023
- Kent County Cup
  - Winners 2019
- Paul Picard Cup
  - Winners 2019, 2020
- George Harley Cup
  - Winners 2018
