= 2025–26 FA Cup qualifying rounds =

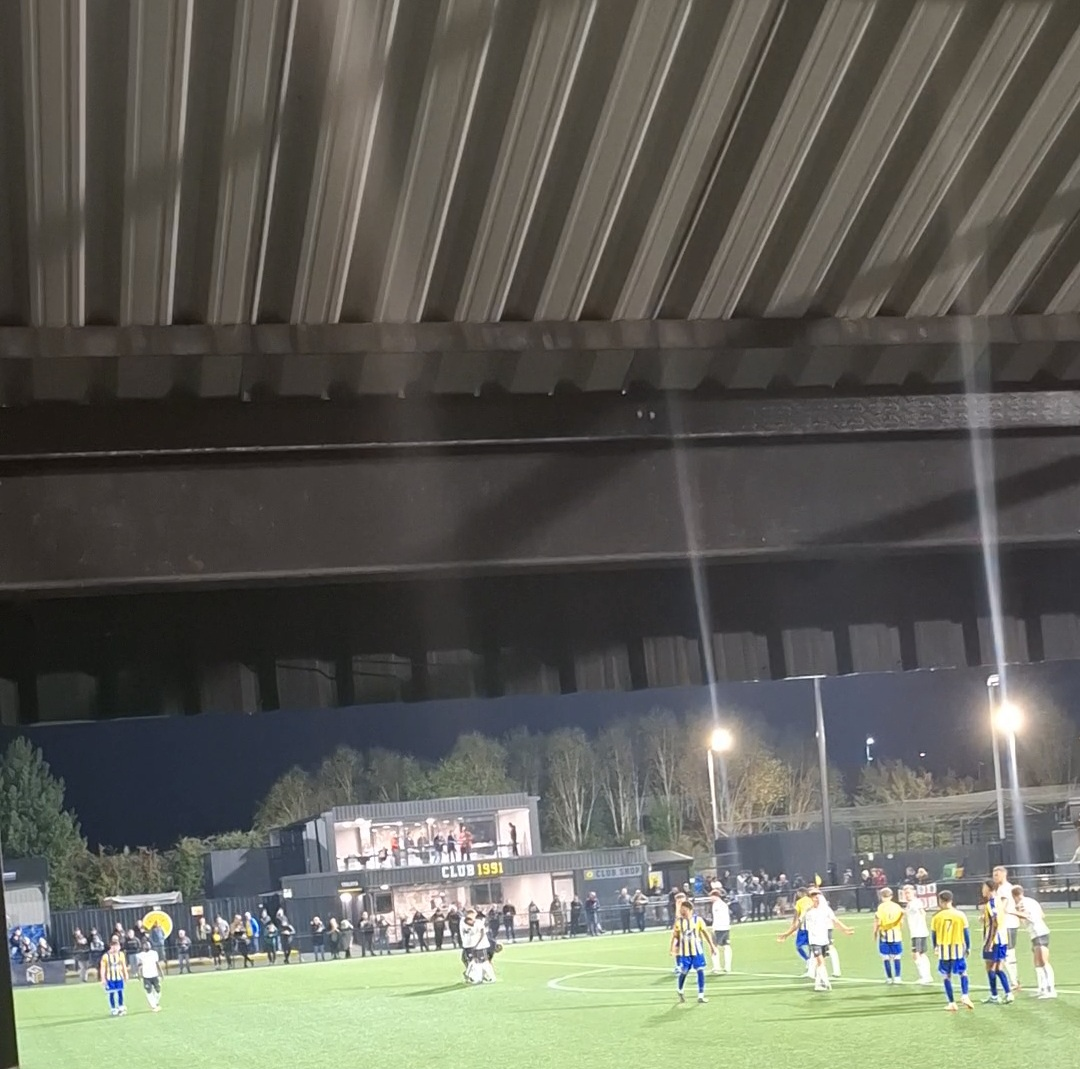
- Sporting Khalsa 2–3 Hereford, Second qualifying round replay, 23 September 2025

Tournament details
- Country: England; Wales
- Dates: 2 August – 14 October 2025
- Teams: 655

The 2025–26 FA Cup qualifying rounds opened the 145th edition of the FA Cup, the world's oldest association football single knockout competition, organised by The Football Association, the governing body for the sport in England. 655 teams in the 5th to 9th tier of English football competed across six rounds for 32 spots in the 2025–26 FA Cup first round proper.

== Eligibility ==
The qualifying rounds were the point of entry into the FA Cup for all "non-League" teams—teams below the top four tiers of English football, and therefore outside the English Football League (EFL). These teams competed in leagues below the EFL which constitute the National League System. The number of teams entered in the FA Cup overall was 747, a rise from 745 teams in 2024–25.

== Calendar ==
| Round | Main date | Leagues entering this round | New entries this round | Winners from the previous round | Number of fixtures | Prize fund | |
| Round | Main date | Leagues entering this round | New entries this round | Winners from the previous round | Number of fixtures | Losing club | Winning club |
|---|---|---|---|---|---|---|---|
| Extra preliminary round | 2 August 2025 | Level 9 Level 8 (32 newly promoted clubs and 95 lowest ranked clubs by points per game from 24/25) | 446 | None | 223 | £375 | £1,125 |
| Preliminary round | 16 August 2025 | Level 8 (Remaining clubs) | 49 | 223 | 136 | £481 | £1,444 |
| First qualifying round | 30 August 2025 | Level 7 | 88 | 136 | 112 | £750 | £2,250 |
| Second qualifying round | 13 September 2025 | National League North; National League South | 48 | 112 | 80 | £1,125 | £3,375 |
| Third qualifying round | 27 September 2025 | None | 0 | 80 | 40 | £1,875 | £5,625 |
| Fourth qualifying round | 11 October 2025 | National League | 24 | 40 | 32 | £3,125 | £9,375 |

== Extra preliminary round ==
The draw for the extra preliminary round was made on 4 July 2025.

| Tie | Home team (Tier) (Note: (9) represents teams allocated to divisions at the 9th tier of English football (otherwise known as Step 5 of the National League System). (8) represents the 8th tier (Step 4 NLS).) | Score | Away team (Tier) | Att. |
Friday 1 August 2025
| 6 | Pickering Town (9) | 3–2 | Penrith (9) | 220 |
| 35 | Bootle (8) | 4–0 | 1874 Northwich (9) | 508 |
| 55 | Stone Old Alleynians (9) | 0–2 | Sutton Coldfield Town (8) | 154 |
| 106 | Enfield (8) | 0–0 | Wormley Rovers (9) | 209 |
Match played at Harlow Town
| 129 | Roman Glass St George (9) | 7–0 | Nailsea & Tickenham (9) | 135 |
Match played at Mangotsfield United
| 49 | Belper United (9) | 2–1 | Uttoxeter Town (9) | 120 |
| 136 | Wokingham Town (9) | 3–2 | Brislington (9) | 391 |
Saturday 2 August 2025
| 198 | Hamworthy Recreation (9) | 1–2 | Hartley Wintney (8) | 125 |
| 151 | Guernsey (9) | 1–1 | Bedfont Sports (8) | 786 |
| 1 | Redcar Athletic (8) | 2–0 | North Ferriby (8) | 310 |
| 2 | Bishop Auckland (8) | 2–2 | Whickham (9) | 397 |
| 3 | Blyth Town (8) | 1–2 | Horden Community Welfare (9) | 259 |
| 4 | West Allotment Celtic (9) | 1–1 | Northallerton Town (9) | 76 |
| 5 | Thornaby (9) | 3–2 | Tadcaster Albion (9) | 172 |
| 7 | Garforth Town (8) | 2–3 | West Auckland Town (9) | 261 |
| 8 | Easington Colliery (9) | 3–1 | Boro Rangers (9) | 103 |
| 9 | Marske United (9) | 2–0 | Carlisle City (9) | 169 |
| 10 | Newcastle Benfield (9) | 2–3 | Pontefract Collieries (8) | 144 |
| 11 | North Shields (9) | 0–2 | Newcastle Blue Star (9) | 587 |
| 12 | Knaresborough Town (9) | 0–0 | Bridlington Town (8) | 240 |
| 13 | Shildon (9) | 3–1 | Ashington (8) | 138 |
Match played at Consett
| 14 | Birtley Town (9) | 3–1 | Beverley Town (9) | 199 |
| 15 | Guisborough Town (9) | 2–2 | Consett (8) | 283 |
| 16 | Whitley Bay (9) | 0–1 | Heaton Stannington (8) | 786 |
| 17 | Crook Town (9) | 1–3 | Kendal Town (9) | 282 |
| 18 | Brighouse Town (8) | 1–0 | Frickley Athletic (9) | 151 |
| 19 | Wythenshawe Town (8) | 2–4 | Prestwich Heys (9) | 250 |
| 21 | Witton Albion (8) | 4–1 | Cheadle Town (9) | 332 |
| 22 | Golcar United (9) | 1–2 | Ramsbottom United (9) | 314 |
| 23 | Pilkington (9) | 2–2 | Longridge Town (9) | 137 |
| 24 | Trafford (8) | 2–1 | Barnoldswick Town (9) | 404 |
| 25 | Parkgate (9) | 1–0 | Eccleshill United (9) | 96 |
| 26 | Glossop North End (9) | 1–1 | FC St Helens (9) | 248 |
| 27 | Charnock Richard (9) | 1–0 | Burscough (9) | 192 |
| 28 | Abbey Hey (9) | 1–1 | AFC Liverpool (9) | 164 |
| 29 | City of Liverpool (9) | 2–1 | Euxton Villa (9) | 161 |
| 30 | Bury (8) | 6–0 | South Liverpool (9) | 1,873 |
| 31 | Chadderton (9) | 2–1 | Stockport Town (9) | 270 |
| 33 | Handsworth (9) | 1–4 | Silsden (8) | 169 |
| 34 | Winsford United (9) | 1–1 | West Didsbury & Chorlton (9) | 513 |
| 36 | Farsley Celtic (9) | W/O (Note: Atherton Collieries awarded a walkover due to Farsley Celtic withdrawing from the competition.) | Atherton Collieries (8) | NA |
| 37 | Irlam (9) | 4–0 | Thackley (9) | 170 |
| 38 | Bradford (Park Avenue) (8) | 1–0 | Mossley (8) | 355 |
| 39 | Atherton Laburnum Rovers (9) | 1–0 | Ossett United (8) | 280 |
| 40 | Horbury Town (9) | 0–0 | Wombwell Town (9) | 260 |
| 41 | Penistone Church (9) | 1–4 | Padiham (9) | 357 |
| 42 | Liversedge (9) | 0–3 | Wythenshawe (9) | 165 |
| 43 | Runcorn Linnets (8) | 1–0 | Clitheroe (8) | 574 |
| 44 | Whitchurch Alport (9) | 4–0 | Litherland REMYCA (9) | 170 |
| 45 | Sheffield (9) | 1–1 | Albion Sports (9) | 344 |
| 46 | Westfields (9) | 2–4 | Atherstone Town (9) | 260 |
| 47 | Heanor Town (9) | 1–3 | Dudley Town (9) | 181 |
| 48 | Hinckley (9) | 4–2 | Highgate United (9) | 203 |
| 50 | Tividale (9) | 1–3 | Clay Cross Town (9) | 113 |
| 51 | Stafford Rangers (8) | 0–1 | Lutterworth Town (9) | 517 |
| 52 | Coton Green (9) | 2–1 | Rugby Town (8) | 260 |
| 53 | Coleshill Town (8) | 2–1 | Nuneaton Town (9) | 410 |
| 54 | Romulus (9) | 0–2 | Coventry Sphinx (8) | 100 |
| 56 | Kidsgrove Athletic (8) | 1–0 | Rugby Borough (8) | 113 |
| 57 | Bedworth United (8) | 2–1 | Brocton (9) | 144 |
| 58 | Pershore Town (9) | 2–1 | Darlaston Town (1874) (8) | 196 |
| 59 | Racing Club Warwick (8) | 2–1 | Droitwich Spa (9) | 404 |
| 60 | Shifnal Town (8) | 0–1 | Coventry United (9) | 193 |
| 61 | Hanley Town (9) | 3–1 | Lichfield City (8) | 130 |
| 62 | Boldmere St. Michaels (8) | 1–3 | Abbey Hulton United (9) | 162 |
| 63 | Newcastle Town (8) | 4–0 | Stourport Swifts (9) | 129 |
| 64 | Hereford Pegasus (9) | 0–2 | Lye Town (9) | 107 |
| 65 | AFC Wolverhampton City (9) | 2–3 | Shepshed Dynamo (8) | 144 |
| 66 | Sporting Club Inkberrow (8) | 2–2 | Studley (9) | 221 |
| 67 | Eastwood (9) | 2–2 | Gresley Rovers (9) | 119 |
| 68 | Worcester Raiders (9) | 1–0 | Ashby Ivanhoe (9) | 228 |
| 69 | Grantham Town (9) | 1–2 | Newark Town (9) | 411 |
| 70 | Blackstones (9) | 2–1 | AFC Mansfield (9) | 112 |
| 71 | AFC Rushden & Diamonds (8) | 0–1 | Grimsby Borough (8) | 413 |
| 72 | Sherwood Colliery (9) | 4–1 | Bugbrooke St Michaels (9) | 89 |
| 73 | Aylestone Park (9) | 1–4 | Northampton Sileby Rangers (9) | 180 |
| 74 | Daventry Town (9) | 3–2 | Leicester Nirvana (9) | 146 |
| 75 | GNG Oadby Town (9) | 1–4 | Newark & Sherwood United (9) | 61 |
| 76 | Bottesford Town (9) | 3–0 | Melton Town (9) | 148 |
| 77 | Harrowby United (9) | 1–2 | Bourne Town (8) | 178 |
| 78 | Loughborough Students (8) | 1–1 | Barton Town (9) | 226 |
Match played at Barton Town
| 79 | Hucknall Town (9) | 3–2 | Yaxley (9) | 235 |
| 80 | Boston Town (9) | 2–0 | Kimberley Miners Welfare (9) | 121 |
| 81 | Lincoln United (8) | 3–0 | Northampton ON Chenecks (9) | 130 |
| 82 | Skegness Town (9) | 2–0 | Godmanchester Rovers (9) | 138 |
| 83 | Rossington Main (9) | 4–1 | Moulton (9) | 129 |
| 84 | Deeping Rangers (9) | 0–3 | Wellingborough Town (8) | 205 |
| 85 | Harleston Town (9) | 2–4 | Walsham-le-Willows (9) | 145 |
| 86 | Heacham (9) | 1–2 | Newmarket Town (8) | 167 |
| 87 | Ipswich Wanderers (9) | 2–1 | Lakenheath (9) | 77 |
| 88 | Mulbarton Wanderers (9) | 3–1 | Dereham Town (9) | 153 |
| 89 | Cornard United (9) | 2–2 | Woodbridge Town (9) | 90 |
| 90 | Gorleston (8) | 5–1 | Hadleigh United (9) | 102 |
| 91 | Fakenham Town (9) | 1–1 | Wroxham (8) | 220 |
| 92 | Kirkley & Pakefield (9) | 0–1 | Cambridge City (8) | 157 |
| 93 | Haverhill Rovers (9) | 3–2 | Wisbech Town (9) | 134 |
| 94 | Stowmarket Town (9) | 1–2 | Ely City (9) | 306 |
| 95 | March Town United (9) | 0–0 | Soham Town Rangers (9) | 298 |
| 96 | Mildenhall Town (8) | 1–1 | Downham Town (8) | 175 |
| 97 | St Neots Town (8) | 7–1 | Great Yarmouth Town (9) | 298 |
| 98 | Histon (9) | 2–2 | Thetford Town (9) | 231 |
| 99 | Ware (8) | 5–0 | AFC Welwyn (9) | 216 |
| 100 | Witham Town (8) | 1–1 | Frenford (9) | 182 |
| 101 | Baldock Town (9) | 1–1 | Little Oakley (9) | 135 |
| 102 | Kempston Rovers (9) | 1–5 | Arlesey Town (9) | 109 |
| 103 | Barking (9) | 1–2 | Grays Athletic (8) | 131 |
| 104 | Maldon & Tiptree (8) | 5–0 | Buckhurst Hill (9) | 442 |
| 105 | White Ensign (9) | 0–2 | Sawbridgeworth Town (9) | 152 |
| 107 | Leighton Town (8) | 1–1 | Benfleet (9) | 505 |
| 108 | Milton Keynes Irish (8) | 3–2 | Heybridge Swifts (8) | 227 |
| 109 | Saffron Walden Town (9) | 1–1 | Harlow Town (9) | 328 |
| 110 | Hullbridge Sports (9) | 3–1 | Basildon United (9) | 184 |
| 111 | Stanway Rovers (8) | 1–0 | Romford (9) | 122 |
| 112 | Takeley (8) | 5–2 | Crawley Green (9) | 131 |
| 113 | Biggleswade (8) | 2–2 | Welwyn Garden City (8) | 155 |
| 114 | Colney Heath (9) | 0–4 | Woodford Town (9) | 137 |
| 115 | Dunstable Town (9) | 1–3 | Great Wakering Rovers (9) | 257 |
| 116 | Harwich & Parkeston (9) | 2–4 | AFC Dunstable (8) | 390 |
| 117 | Eynesbury Rovers (9) | 4–1 | Potton United (9) | 137 |
| 118 | Walthamstow (8) | 1–1 | Brantham Athletic (8) | 182 |
| 119 | Tring Athletic (9) | 5–0 | West Essex (9) | 169 |
| 120 | Stotfold (8) | 0–4 | Redbridge (8) | 175 |
| 121 | Cockfosters (9) | 2–2 | Kings Langley (9) | 205 |
| 122 | Harpenden Town (9) | 1–1 | Concord Rangers (8) | 217 |
| 123 | Haringey Borough (9) | 3–1 | Halstead Town (9) | 271 |
| 124 | Biggleswade United (9) | 5–1 | Newport Pagnell Town (9) | 173 |
| 125 | Leverstock Green (8) | 0–1 | Ilford (9) | 97 |
| 126 | Hertford Town (8) | 3–1 | London Lions (8) | 224 |
| 127 | Binfield (8) | 4–1 | Winslow United (9) | 131 |
| 128 | Longlevens (9) | 1–5 | Fairford Town (9) | 221 |
| 130 | Aylesbury Vale Dynamos (9) | 1–1 | Abingdon United (9) | 195 |
| 131 | Cinderford Town (9) | 0–1 | Amersham Town (9) | 165 |
| 132 | Burnham (9) | 3–2 | Holyport (9) | 112 |
| 133 | Cirencester Town (9) | 0–0 | Reading City (9) | 144 |
| 134 | Hartpury (8) | 1–2 | Tuffley Rovers (9) | 93 |
| 135 | Portishead Town (8) | 4–3 | Windsor & Eton (9) | 241 |
| 137 | Hallen (9) | 1–0 | Highworth Town (9) | 55 |
| 138 | Kidlington (9) | 0–0 | Clevedon Town (9) | 157 |
| 139 | Oldland Abbotonians (9) | 2–0 | Wallingford & Crowmarsh (9) | 94 |
| 140 | Ardley United (9) | 1–0 | Aylesbury United (8) | 137 |
| 141 | Lydney Town (9) | 3–3 | Royal Wootton Bassett Town (9) | 177 |
| 142 | Thornbury Town (9) | 2–2 | Virginia Water (9) | 116 |
| 143 | North Leigh (9) | 1–2 | Risborough Rangers (9) | 78 |
| 144 | Milton United (9) | 0–6 | Didcot Town (8) | 509 |
Match played at Didcot Town

| Tie | Home team (Tier) | Score | Away team (Tier) | Att. |
|---|---|---|---|---|
| 145 | Cribbs (9) | 2–0 | Easington Sports (9) | 83 |
| 146 | Beaconsfield Town (8) | 0–1 | Larkhall Athletic (8) | 60 |
| 147 | Mangotsfield United (9) | 1–1 | Bristol Manor Farm (8) | 354 |
| 148 | Corsham Town (9) | 0–1 | Slimbridge (9) | 125 |
| 149 | Bearsted (9) | 1–2 | Hackney Wick (9) | 172 |
| 150 | Seaford Town (9) | 1–0 | Sutton Athletic (9) | 554 |
| 153 | Eastbourne Town (8) | 2–2 | Ashford Town (Middlesex) (9) | 279 |
| 154 | Hassocks (8) | 1–0 | Rayners Lane (8) | 234 |
| 155 | Pagham (9) | 2–3 | Horsham YM (9) | 158 |
| 156 | Erith Town (8) | 0–0 | Sporting Bengal United (9) | 92 |
| 157 | Three Bridges (8) | 5–2 | Shoreham (9) | 151 |
| 158 | Faversham Strike Force (9) | 0–4 | Chislehurst Glebe (9) | 160 |
| 159 | Guildford City (9) | 1–1 | Sutton Common Rovers (9) | 98 |
Match played at Westfield
| 160 | Peacehaven & Telscombe (9) | 2–2 | Harefield United (9) | 171 |
| 161 | Tunbridge Wells (9) | 1–1 | Holmesdale (9) | 183 |
| 162 | Larkfield & New Hythe Wanderers (9) | 0–3 | Epsom & Ewell (9) | 140 |
| 163 | Hollands & Blair (9) | 1–0 | Herne Bay (8) | 235 |
| 164 | AFC Varndeanians (9) | 1–2 | Tooting & Mitcham United (9) | 133 |
Match played at Newhaven
| 165 | Redhill (9) | 0–4 | North Greenford United (9) | 187 |
| 166 | South Park (Reigate) (8) | 2–1 | Newhaven (9) | 155 |
| 167 | Abbey Rangers (9) | 2–4 | Corinthian-Casuals (9) | 222 |
| 168 | Badshot Lea (9) | 3–6 | Steyning Town (9) | 153 |
| 169 | Fisher (9) | 3–1 | Camberley Town (9) | 264 |
| 170 | AFC Whyteleafe (8) | 5–0 | Chipstead (9) | 298 |
| 171 | Wick (9) | 2–3 | VCD Athletic (8) | 135 |
| 172 | Broadbridge Heath (8) | 1–3 | Cobham (9) | 128 |
| 173 | AFC Croydon Athletic (8) | 3–0 | Roffey (9) | 174 |
Match played at Roffey
| 174 | East Grinstead Town (8) | 1–4 | Eastbourne United (9) | 194 |
| 175 | Haywards Heath Town (9) | 0–1 | Ashford United (8) | 322 |
| 177 | Balham (9) | 1–1 | Faversham Town (8) | 145 |
| 178 | Raynes Park Vale (8) | 2–1 | Forest Row (9) | 161 |
| 179 | Edgware & Kingsbury (9) | 2–0 | British Airways (9) | 70 |
| 180 | Athletic Newham (9) | 1–3 | Sevenoaks Town (8) | 74 |
| 181 | Lingfield (9) | 2–7 | Whitstable Town (9) | 66 |
Match played at Steyning Town
| 182 | Rusthall (9) | 2–5 | Westfield (8) | 239 |
| 183 | Northwood (8) | 0–1 | Egham Town (8) | 204 |
| 184 | Punjab United (9) | 2–2 | Crowborough Athletic (8) | 114 |
| 185 | Kennington (9) | 0–4 | Soul Tower Hamlets (9) | 94 |
| 186 | Sheppey United (8) | 3–1 | Metropolitan Police (8) | 326 |
| 188 | Hythe Town (9) | 2–5 | Littlehampton Town (8) | 253 |
| 189 | Snodland Town (9) | 4–0 | Broadfields United (9) | 310 |
| 190 | Bexhill United (9) | 3–1 | Sheerwater (9) | 78 |
Match played at Eastbourne United
| 191 | Leatherhead (8) | 2–2 | Phoenix Sports (9) | 439 |
| 192 | Midhurst & Easebourne (9) | 0–1 | Knaphill (9) | 139 |
| 193 | Horley Town (9) | 0–0 | Corinthian (9) | 97 |
| 194 | Lancing (9) | 1–0 | Crawley Down Gatwick (9) | 251 |
| 196 | Cowes Sports (9) | 2–2 | Laverstock & Ford (9) | 170 |
| 197 | Downton (9) | 0–2 | Fareham Town (8) | 154 |
| 199 | Bradford Town (9) | 3–1 | Bournemouth (9) | 271 |
| 200 | Hythe & Dibden (9) | 3–1 | Portland United (9) | 89 |
| 201 | Christchurch (9) | 3–0 | Bemerton Heath Harlequins (9) | 85 |
Match played at Shaftesbury
| 202 | Baffins Milton Rovers (9) | 1–1 | Shaftesbury (8) | 185 |
| 203 | Tadley Calleva (9) | 4–1 | Millbrook (Hampshire) (9) | 123 |
| 204 | Melksham Town (8) | 2–2 | AFC Portchester (8) | 353 |
| 205 | Alton (9) | 5–0 | Wincanton Town (9) | 260 |
| 206 | Bashley (8) | 1–0 | East Cowes Victoria Athletic (9) | 298 |
| 207 | Thatcham Town (9) | 2–0 | Petersfield Town (9) | 233 |
| 208 | Paulton Rovers (9) | 1–0 | Hamble Club (9) | 140 |
| 209 | AFC Stoneham (9) | 2–0 | Fleet Town (9) | 132 |
| 210 | Eversley & California (9) | 0–1 | Horndean (8) | 231 |
| 211 | Moneyfields (8) | 2–1 | Brockenhurst (9) | 118 |
| 212 | Westbury United (8) | 7–0 | Sherborne Town (9) | 212 |
| 213 | Andover New Street (9) | 0–1 | New Milton Town (9) | 210 |
| 214 | Falmouth Town (8) | 2–1 | Helston Athletic (9) | 376 |
| 215 | Tavistock (8) | 5–0 | AFC St Austell (9) | 181 |
| 216 | Saltash United (9) | 1–6 | Torpoint Athletic (9) | 276 |
| 217 | Street (9) | 2–2 | Brixham (8) | 154 |
| 218 | St Blazey (9) | 1–2 | Buckland Athletic (9) | 219 |
| 219 | Bideford (8) | 4–1 | Wellington AFC (9) | 268 |
| 220 | Willand Rovers (8) | 0–2 | Barnstaple Town (9) | 249 |
| 221 | Mousehole (8) | 4–0 | Bridgwater United (9) | 234 |
| 222 | Sidmouth Town (9) | 3–1 | Ivybridge Town (9) | 121 |
Match played at Buckland Athletic
| 223 | Newquay (9) | 2–2 | Shepton Mallet (9) | 301 |
| 195 | Jersey Bulls (8) | 5–0 | Erith & Belvedere (9) | 598 |
Sunday 3 August 2025
| 152 | Stansfeld (9) | 0–4 | Harrow Borough (8) | 181 |
| 20 | Hallam (8) | 3–1 | Lower Breck (8) | 680 |
| 176 | Hilltop (9) | 2–2 | Deal Town (8) | 155 |
| 187 | Little Common (9) | 1–1 | Southall (8) | 221 |
| 32 | Northwich Victoria (9) | 0–2 | Campion (9) | 242 |
Replays
Monday 4 August 2025
| 66R | Studley (9) | 2–3 | Sporting Club Inkberrow (8) | 74 |
| 159R | Sutton Common Rovers (9) | 1–0 | Guildford City (9) | 158 |
| 191R | Phoenix Sports (9) | 0–3 | Leatherhead (8) | 208 |
Tuesday 5 August 2025
| 160R | Harefield United (9) | 3–2 (a.e.t.) | Peacehaven & Telscombe (9) | 155 |
| 196R | Laverstock & Ford (9) | 2–1 | Cowes Sports (9) | 112 |
| 217R | Brixham (8) | 2–0 | Street (9) | 184 |
| 223R | Shepton Mallet (9) | 0–2 | Newquay (9) | 278 |
| 4R | Northallerton Town (9) | 3–0 | West Allotment Celtic (9) | 198 |
| 12R | Bridlington Town (8) | Void (Note: The score was 2–1 to Bridlington after extra time, however a second replay was ordered after Knaresborough were mistakenly denied a final substitution in extra time.) | Knaresborough Town (9) | 363 |
| 15R | Consett (8) | 0–2 | Guisborough Town (9) | 196 |
| 23R | Longridge Town (9) | 8–1 | Pilkington (9) | 179 |
| 26R | FC St Helens (9) | 3–1 | Glossop North End (9) | 241 |
| 40R | Wombwell Town (9) | 4–0 | Horbury Town (9) | 467 |
| 45R | Albion Sports (9) | 2–3 | Sheffield (9) | 265 |
| 67R | Gresley Rovers (9) | 0–0 (2–4 p) | Eastwood (9) | 382 |
| 78R | Barton Town (9) | 2–1 | Loughborough Students (8) | 276 |
| 89R | Woodbridge Town (9) | 4–2 (a.e.t.) | Cornard United (9) | 177 |
| 91R | Wroxham (8) | 2–0 | Fakenham Town (9) | 356 |
| 95R | Soham Town Rangers (9) | 1–4 | March Town United (9) | 224 |
| 96R | Downham Town (8) | 1–1 (4–5 p) | Mildenhall Town (8) | 211 |
| 98R | Thetford Town (9) | 0–1 (a.e.t.) | Histon (9) | 290 |
| 100R | Frenford (9) | 0–3 | Witham Town (8) | 222 |
| 101R | Little Oakley (9) | 1–0 | Baldock Town (9) | 111 |
| 106R | Wormley Rovers (9) | 2–3 | Enfield (8) | 175 |
| 107R | Benfleet (9) | 0–1 | Leighton Town (8) | 469 |
| 109R | Harlow Town (9) | 2–1 | Saffron Walden Town (9) | 501 |
| 113R | Welwyn Garden City (8) | 2–0 | Biggleswade (8) | 146 |
| 118R | Brantham Athletic (8) | 4–1 | Walthamstow (8) | 110 |
| 121R | Kings Langley (9) | 2–4 | Cockfosters (9) | 207 |
| 122R | Concord Rangers (8) | 0–0 (3–4 p) | Harpenden Town (9) | 168 |
| 130R | Abingdon United (9) | 1–2 (a.e.t.) | Aylesbury Vale Dynamos (9) | 354 |
| 133R | Reading City (9) | 2–0 | Cirencester Town (9) | 143 |
| 142R | Virginia Water (9) | 3–2 | Thornbury Town (9) | 61 |
Match played at Slough Town
| 147R | Bristol Manor Farm (8) | 0–1 | Mangotsfield United (9) | 368 |
| 151R | Bedfont Sports (8) | W/O (Note: Bedfont Sports were awarded a walkover after Guernsey were eliminated from the competition for fielding an unregistered player in the 1–1 draw between the sides. Therefore, the scheduled replay was cancelled.) | Guernsey (9) | NA |
| 153R | Ashford Town (Middlesex) (9) | 3–2 (a.e.t.) | Eastbourne Town (8) | 216 |
| 176R | Deal Town (8) | 4–1 | Hilltop (9) | 511 |
| 177R | Faversham Town (8) | 5–1 | Balham (9) | 239 |
| 184R | Crowborough Athletic (8) | 3–2 | Punjab United (9) | 285 |
| 193R | Corinthian (9) | 3–3 (6–5 p) | Horley Town (9) | 143 |
| 202R | Shaftesbury (8) | 5–0 | Baffins Milton Rovers (9) | 84 |
| 204R | AFC Portchester (8) | 3–1 | Melksham Town (8) | 394 |
Wednesday 6 August 2025
| 138R | Clevedon Town (9) | 2–0 | Kidlington (9) | 188 |
| 2R | Whickham (9) | 0–5 | Bishop Auckland (8) | 273 |
| 28R | AFC Liverpool (9) | 2–1 | Abbey Hey (9) | 178 |
Match played at Bootle
| 34R | West Didsbury & Chorlton (9) | 2–1 (a.e.t.) | Winsford United (9) | 319 |
Match played at Irlam
| 141R | Royal Wootton Bassett Town (9) | 3–0 | Lydney Town (9) | 192 |
| 156R | Sporting Bengal United (9) | 2–4 | Erith Town (8) | 110 |
| 161R | Holmesdale (9) | 1–0 | Tunbridge Wells (9) | 163 |
| 187R | Southall (8) | 3–0 | Little Common (9) | 119 |
Tuesday 12 August 2025
| 12R | Bridlington Town (8) | 4–1 | Knaresborough Town (9) | 302 |

== Preliminary round ==
The draw for the preliminary round was made on 4 July 2025, following the draw for the extra preliminary round. This round saw the remaining teams from Tier 8 enter the competition.

| Tie | Home team (Tier) (Note: (9) represents teams allocated to divisions at the 9th tier of English football (otherwise known as Step 5 of the National League System). (8) represents the 8th tier (Step 4 NLS).) | Score | Away team (Tier) | Att. |
Friday 15 August 2025
| 3 | Pickering Town (9) | 0–0 | Easington Colliery (9) | 319 |
| 16 | Atherton Collieries (8) | 2–0 | Prestwich Heys (9) | 293 |
| 33 | Lye Town (9) | 0–2 | Racing Club Warwick (8) | 241 |
| 99 | Epsom & Ewell (9) | 2–2 | South Park (Reigate) (8) | 229 |
| 123 | Christchurch (9) | 0–3 | Tadley Calleva (9) | 86 |
Match played at Shaftesbury
Saturday 16 August 2025
| 103 | Jersey Bulls (8) | 2–0 | Fisher (9) | 563 |
| 1 | Bishop Auckland (8) | 2–1 | Horden Community Welfare (9) | 335 |
| 2 | Guisborough Town (9) | 0–0 | Redcar Athletic (8) | 567 |
| 4 | Newton Aycliffe (8) | 2–3 | Newcastle Blue Star (9) | 233 |
| 5 | West Auckland Town (9) | 2–2 | Bridlington Town (8) | 224 |
| 6 | Pontefract Collieries (8) | 1–0 | Blyth Spartans (8) | 201 |
| 7 | Heaton Stannington (8) | 3–0 | Marske United (9) | 419 |
| 8 | Northallerton Town (9) | 2–2 | Kendal Town (9) | 210 |
| 9 | Birtley Town (9) | 2–2 | Shildon (9) | 174 |
| 10 | Thornaby (9) | 1–2 | Dunston (8) | 229 |
| 11 | Irlam (9) | 0–1 | Chadderton (9) | 164 |
| 12 | Witton Albion (8) | 4–1 | AFC Liverpool (9) | 300 |
| 13 | Wombwell Town (9) | 2–1 | Parkgate (9) | 308 |
| 14 | Sheffield (9) | 0–3 | Bootle (8) | 305 |
| 15 | Bradford (Park Avenue) (8) | 1–3 | Avro (8) | 279 |
| 17 | Nantwich Town (8) | 1–0 | Charnock Richard (9) | 305 |
| 18 | Trafford (8) | 3–0 | Campion (9) | 344 |
| 19 | West Didsbury & Chorlton (9) | 1–0 | Brighouse Town (8) | 743 |
| 20 | Wythenshawe (9) | A–A (Note: The match was abandoned with the score at 2–3, after a Wythenshawe player was seriously injured in second-half stoppage time.) | Vauxhall Motors (8) | 410 |
| 21 | Whitchurch Alport (9) | 0–3 | Runcorn Linnets (8) | 277 |
| 22 | Stalybridge Celtic (8) | 1–1 | Bury (8) | 1,525 |
| 23 | FC St Helens (9) | 0–2 | Atherton Laburnum Rovers (9) | 298 |
| 25 | Silsden (8) | 1–1 | Ramsbottom United (9) | 201 |
| 26 | Congleton Town (8) | 3–0 | Padiham (9) | 560 |
| 27 | Longridge Town (9) | 5–1 | Emley (8) | 212 |
| 28 | Coton Green (9) | 0–4 | Eastwood (9) | 130 |
| 29 | Coventry Sphinx (8) | 3–0 | Dudley Town (9) | 126 |
| 30 | Lutterworth Town (9) | 0–1 | Chasetown (8) | 110 |
| 31 | Belper Town (8) | 1–2 | Kidsgrove Athletic (8) | 365 |
| 32 | Malvern Town (8) | 2–4 | Worcester Raiders (9) | 303 |
| 34 | Bedworth United (8) | 0–2 | Atherstone Town (9) | 380 |
| 35 | Pershore Town (9) | 0–3 | Coleshill Town (8) | 193 |
| 36 | Hinckley (9) | 0–3 | Long Eaton United (8) | 214 |
| 37 | Shepshed Dynamo (8) | 2–0 | Clay Cross Town (9) | 200 |
| 38 | Sutton Coldfield Town (8) | 3–1 | Newcastle Town (8) | 144 |
| 39 | Sporting Khalsa (8) | 5–1 | Sporting Club Inkberrow (8) | 156 |
| 40 | Abbey Hulton United (9) | 4–3 | Coventry United (9) | |
| 41 | Belper United (9) | 2–5 | Hanley Town (9) | 83 |
| 42 | Mickleover (8) | 0–2 | Matlock Town (8) | 315 |
| 43 | Blackstones (9) | 1–2 | Grimsby Borough (8) | 133 |
| 44 | Rossington Main (9) | 3–2 | Newark Town (9) | 248 |
| 45 | Daventry Town (9) | 1–2 | Bottesford Town (9) | 118 |
| 46 | Basford United (8) | 5–0 | Hucknall Town (9) | 394 |
| 47 | Newark & Sherwood United (9) | 0–0 | Boston Town (9) | 109 |
| 48 | Barton Town (9) | 1–6 | Carlton Town (8) | 228 |
| 49 | Wellingborough Town (8) | 1–2 | Bourne Town (8) | 185 |
| 50 | Sherwood Colliery (9) | 3–1 | Anstey Nomads (8) | 131 |
| 51 | Skegness Town (9) | 1–1 | Lincoln United (8) | 240 |
| 52 | Northampton Sileby Rangers (9) | 0–2 | Corby Town (8) | 291 |
| 53 | Gorleston (8) | 2–2 | Walsham-le-Willows (9) | 123 |
| 54 | March Town United (9) | 2–0 | Ipswich Wanderers (9) | 192 |
| 55 | Histon (9) | 5–2 | Woodbridge Town (9) | 180 |
| 56 | Newmarket Town (8) | 1–1 | Felixstowe & Walton United (8) | 156 |
| 57 | Mildenhall Town (8) | 1–0 | Wroxham (8) | 177 |
| 58 | Mulbarton Wanderers (9) | 2–0 | Cambridge City (8) | 182 |
| 59 | Ely City (9) | 0–1 | Haverhill Rovers (9) | 201 |
| 60 | Lowestoft Town (8) | 3–2 | St Neots Town (8) | 340 |
| 61 | Welwyn Garden City (8) | 2–2 | Waltham Abbey (8) | 128 |
| 62 | Tilbury (8) | 1–0 | AFC Dunstable (8) | 205 |
| 63 | Witham Town (8) | 4–0 | Tring Athletic (9) | 208 |
| 64 | Brightlingsea Regent (8) | 2–1 | Hullbridge Sports (9) | 164 |
| 65 | Cockfosters (9) | 2–0 | Little Oakley (9) | 101 |
| 66 | Takeley (8) | 0–0 | Bowers & Pitsea (8) | 120 |
| 67 | Milton Keynes Irish (8) | 0–2 | Arlesey Town (9) | 155 |
| 68 | Hertford Town (8) | 5–3 | Harpenden Town (9) | 202 |
| 69 | Hadley (8) | 1–2 | Maldon & Tiptree (8) | 191 |
| 71 | Harlow Town (9) | 1–1 | Woodford Town (9) | 330 |
| 72 | Ware (8) | 2–2 | Ilford (9) | 121 |
| 73 | Barton Rovers (8) | 2–0 | Brantham Athletic (8) | 151 |
| 74 | Sawbridgeworth Town (9) | 1–3 | Eynesbury Rovers (9) | 110 |
| 75 | Great Wakering Rovers (9) | 0–0 | Redbridge (8) | 124 |
| 76 | Haringey Borough (9) | 1–5 | Stanway Rovers (8) | 172 |
| 77 | Hitchin Town (8) | 1–1 | Grays Athletic (8) | 486 |
| 78 | Leighton Town (8) | 3–1 | Biggleswade United (9) | 398 |
| 79 | Portishead Town (8) | 2–6 | Slimbridge (9) | 261 |
| 80 | Fairford Town (9) | 2–0 | Roman Glass St George (9) | 104 |
| 81 | Hallen (9) | 0–4 | Bishop's Cleeve (8) | 83 |
| 83 | Risborough Rangers (9) | 3–0 | Virginia Water (9) | 94 |
| 84 | Clevedon Town (9) | 1–3 | Thame United (8) | 109 |
| 85 | Mangotsfield United (9) | 3–0 | Cribbs (9) | 295 |
| 86 | Aylesbury Vale Dynamos (9) | 2–1 | Oldland Abbotonians (9) | 155 |

| Tie | Home team (Tier) | Score | Away team (Tier) | Att. |
|---|---|---|---|---|
| 87 | Marlow (8) | 2–1 | Binfield (8) | 266 |
| 88 | Royal Wootton Bassett Town (9) | 3–1 | Amersham Town (9) | 187 |
| 89 | Reading City (9) | 1–2 | Didcot Town (8) | 198 |
| 90 | Flackwell Heath (8) | 1–0 | Tuffley Rovers (9) | 210 |
| 91 | Ardley United (9) | 1–2 | Burnham (9) | 52 |
| 92 | Leatherhead (8) | 0–1 | Westfield (8) | 410 |
| 93 | Crowborough Athletic (8) | 0–1 | Deal Town (8) | 209 |
| 94 | Bexhill United (9) | 0–3 | Raynes Park Vale (8) | 95 |
| 95 | Edgware & Kingsbury (9) | 0–9 | Whitstable Town (9) | 80 |
| 96 | Cobham (9) | 2–2 | Margate (8) | 142 |
| 97 | Lancing (9) | 3–0 | Harefield United (9) | 176 |
| 98 | VCD Athletic (8) | 0–1 | Sittingbourne (8) | 103 |
| 100 | Knaphill (9) | 1–1 | Hollands & Blair (9) | 116 |
| 101 | Ascot United (8) | 2–1 | Chislehurst Glebe (9) | 103 |
| 102 | Hayes & Yeading United (8) | 2–1 | Sutton Common Rovers (9) | 164 |
| 104 | Sheppey United (8) | 9–0 | Eastbourne United (9) | 300 |
| 105 | Corinthian (9) | 2–2 | Egham Town (8) | 129 |
| 106 | Seaford Town (9) | 0–2 | AFC Whyteleafe (8) | 238 |
| 107 | Bedfont Sports (8) | 2–0 | Kingstonian (8) | 183 |
| 108 | Three Bridges (8) | 4–1 | Horsham YM (9) | 228 |
| 109 | Hassocks (8) | 0–1 | Beckenham Town (8) | 207 |
| 110 | Erith Town (8) | 1–1 | Southall (8) | 86 |
| 111 | Steyning Town (9) | 2–1 | Hendon (8) | 105 |
| 112 | Ashford United (8) | 4–1 | Holmesdale (9) | 410 |
| 113 | Soul Tower Hamlets (9) | 3–2 | Hanworth Villa (8) | 76 |
| 115 | Merstham (8) | 2–4 | Faversham Town (8) | 306 |
| 116 | Tooting & Mitcham United (9) | 0–1 | AFC Croydon Athletic (8) | 315 |
| 117 | Hastings United (8) | 1–0 | Harrow Borough (8) | 527 |
| 118 | Ashford Town (Middlesex) (9) | 3–2 | Snodland Town (9) | 113 |
| 120 | Corinthian-Casuals (9) | 3–5 | Sevenoaks Town (8) | 302 |
| 121 | Fareham Town (8) | 1–0 | Hartley Wintney (8) | 187 |
| 122 | Horndean (8) | 0–2 | Laverstock & Ford (9) | 96 |
| 124 | Winchester City (8) | 1–1 | Bashley (8) | 331 |
| 125 | Shaftesbury (8) | 4–0 | Thatcham Town (9) | 112 |
| 126 | Alton (9) | 1–1 | Swindon Supermarine (8) | 286 |
| 127 | Moneyfields (8) | 1–2 | AFC Portchester (8) | 413 |
| 128 | Bradford Town (9) | 0–1 | Westbury United (8) | 495 |
| 129 | AFC Stoneham (9) | 1–0 | Paulton Rovers (9) | 92 |
| 130 | Hythe & Dibden (9) | 1–0 | New Milton Town (9) | 101 |
| 131 | Exmouth Town (8) | 2–1 | Buckland Athletic (9) | 235 |
| 132 | Sidmouth Town (9) | 2–4 | Torpoint Athletic (9) | 132 |
| 133 | Frome Town (8) | 2–1 | Newquay (9) | 355 |
| 134 | Barnstaple Town (9) | 1–2 | Tavistock (8) | 208 |
| 135 | Falmouth Town (8) | 2–1 | Bideford (8) | 285 |
| 136 | Brixham (8) | 4–3 | Mousehole (8) | 182 |
Sunday 17 August 2025
| 24 | Hallam (8) | 3–0 | City of Liverpool (9) | 631 |
| 114 | Hackney Wick (9) | 3–1 | Bognor Regis Town (8) | 110 |
Match played at Clapton CFC
| 70 | Enfield (8) | 4–2 | Biggleswade Town (8) | 190 |
Match played at Harlow Town
| 82 | Wokingham Town (9) | 2–0 | Larkhall Athletic (8) | 341 |
| 119 | Littlehampton Town (8) | 3–0 | North Greenford United (9) | 263 |
Replays
Monday 18 August 2025
| 126R | Swindon Supermarine (8) | 2–0 | Alton (9) | 279 |
Tuesday 19 August 2025
| 9R | Shildon (9) | 5–2 | Birtley Town (9) | 192 |
Match played at Crook Town
| 8R | Kendal Town (9) | 3–1 | Northallerton Town (9) | 381 |
| 20R | Vauxhall Motors (8) | 0–2 | Wythenshawe (9) | 163 |
| 22R | Bury (8) | 0–2 | Stalybridge Celtic (8) | 1,973 |
| 25R | Ramsbottom United (9) | 2–2 (2–3 p) | Silsden (8) | 215 |
| 47R | Boston Town (9) | 4–1 | Newark & Sherwood United (9) | 105 |
| 51R | Lincoln United (8) | 1–2 | Skegness Town (9) | 202 |
| 53R | Walsham-le-Willows (9) | 1–1 (5–6 p) | Gorleston (8) | 153 |
| 56R | Felixstowe & Walton United (8) | 0–2 | Newmarket Town (8) | 384 |
| 61R | Waltham Abbey (8) | 3-1 | Welwyn Garden City (8) | 133 |
| 66R | Bowers & Pitsea (8) | 2–0 | Takeley (8) | 184 |
| 75R | Redbridge (8) | 1–0 | Great Wakering Rovers (9) | 123 |
| 96R | Margate (8) | 0–1 | Cobham (9) | 380 |
| 99R | South Park (Reigate) (8) | 1–2 | Epsom & Ewell (9) | 205 |
| 105R | Egham Town (8) | A–A (Note: The match was abandoned with the score at 2–1, after the linesman was seriously injured in the second-half.) | Corinthian (9) | 105 |
| 124R | Bashley (8) | 0–1 | Winchester City (8) | 330 |
| 5R | Bridlington Town (8) | 1–2 | West Auckland Town (9) | 482 |
Wednesday 20 August 2025
| 2R | Redcar Athletic (8) | 1–0 | Guisborough Town (9) | 620 |
| 3R | Easington Colliery (9) | 0–2 | Pickering Town (9) | 154 |
| 71R | Woodford Town (9) | 3–2 (a.e.t.) | Harlow Town (9) | 255 |
| 72R | Ilford (9) | 1–1 (5–3 p) | Ware (8) | 64 |
| 77R | Grays Athletic (8) | 0–1 | Hitchin Town (8) | 291 |
| 100R | Hollands & Blair (9) | 0–1 (a.e.t.) | Knaphill (9) | 197 |
| 110R | Southall (8) | 1–4 | Erith Town (8) | 149 |
Tuesday 26 August 2025
| 105R | Egham Town (8) | 4–0 | Corinthian (9) | 149 |

== First qualifying round ==
The draw for the first qualifying round was made on 18 August 2025. This round saw all teams from step three enter the competition.

Number of non-league teams per tier still in qualifying
| National League (Note: National League teams joined in the fourth round of qualifying) | North/South (Note: National League North/South teams joined in the second round of qualifying.) | Premier Division | Division One | Regional | Total |
|---|---|---|---|---|---|
| 24 / 24 | 48 / 48 | 88 / 88 | 84 / 84 | 52 / 52 | 296 / 296 |

| Tie | Home team (Tier) (Note: (9) represents teams allocated to divisions at the 9th tier of English football (otherwise known as Step 5 of the National League System). (8) represents the 8th tier (Step 4 NLS). (7) represents the 7th tier (Step 3 NLS).) | Score | Away team (Tier) | Att. |
Friday 29 August 2025
| 57 | Aveley (7) | 3–0 | Hashtag United (7) | 404 |
| 75 | Faversham Town (8) | 2–2 | Hastings United (8) | 445 |
| 9 | Pickering Town (9) | 5–2 | Redcar Athletic (8) | 404 |
Saturday 30 August 2025
| 103 | Tadley Calleva (9) | 4–2 | Weymouth (7) | 525 |
| 92 | Burnham (9) | 0–3 | Jersey Bulls (8) | 130 |
| 1 | Hebburn Town (7) | 1–0 | Longridge Town (9) | 303 |
| 2 | Trafford (8) | 2–1 | Stockton Town (7) | 283 |
| 3 | Atherton Laburnum Rovers (9) | 5–2 | Atherton Collieries (8) | 974 |
| 4 | West Didsbury & Chorlton (9) | 0–2 | Runcorn Linnets (8) | 1,169 |
| 5 | West Auckland Town (9) | 3–1 | Wythenshawe (9) | 261 |
| 6 | Witton Albion (8) | 3–3 | Shildon (9) | 367 |
| 7 | Warrington Rylands 1906 (7) | 1–4 | Guiseley (7) | 219 |
| 10 | Hyde United (7) | 2–2 | Prescot Cables (7) | 458 |
| 11 | Wombwell Town (9) | 1–3 | Stocksbridge Park Steels (7) | 437 |
| 12 | Workington (7) | 2–3 | Stalybridge Celtic (8) | 629 |
| 13 | Warrington Town (7) | 0–3 | Bamber Bridge (7) | 491 |
| 14 | Widnes (7) | W/O (Note: Congleton Town awarded a walkover due to Widnes withdrawing from the competition.) | Congleton Town (8) | NA |
| 15 | Lancaster City (7) | 1–2 | Whitby Town (7) | 344 |
| 16 | Newcastle Blue Star (9) | 1–0 | Heaton Stannington (8) | 813 |
| 17 | Avro (8) | 1–1 | Nantwich Town (8) | 169 |
| 18 | Morpeth Town (7) | 2–1 | Pontefract Collieries (8) | 211 |
| 19 | Rossington Main (9) | 0–4 | FC United of Manchester (7) | 1,458 |
| 20 | Kendal Town (9) | 0–1 | Dunston (8) | 434 |
| 21 | Bishop Auckland (8) | 1–3 | Chadderton (9) | 381 |
| 22 | Silsden (8) | 0–0 | Bootle (8) | 271 |
| 23 | Redditch United (7) | 5–0 | Skegness Town (9) | 393 |
| 24 | Hanley Town (9) | 0–2 | Stourbridge (7) | 155 |
| 25 | Boston Town (9) | 1–1 | Sporting Khalsa (8) | 150 |
| 26 | Matlock Town (8) | 4–1 | Bottesford Town (9) | 404 |
| 27 | Eastwood (9) | 1–2 | Grimsby Borough (8) | 98 |
| 28 | Coleshill Town (8) | 2–1 | Worcester Raiders (9) | 153 |
| 29 | Harborough Town (7) | 0–0 | Leek Town (7) | 524 |
| 30 | Carlton Town (8) | 3–0 | Cleethorpes Town (7) | 230 |
| 31 | Evesham United (7) | 5–2 | Bromsgrove Sporting (7) | 429 |
| 32 | Alvechurch (7) | 4–2 | Barwell (7) | 208 |
| 33 | Long Eaton United (8) | 1–4 | Kettering Town (7) | 432 |
| 34 | Hednesford Town (7) | 3–1 | Basford United (8) | 1,226 |
| 35 | Halesowen Town (7) | 1–1 | Stratford Town (7) | 807 |
| 36 | Quorn (7) | 8–0 | Sherwood Colliery (9) | 332 |
| 37 | Ilkeston Town (7) | 1–2 | Spalding United (7) | 402 |
| 38 | Worcester City (7) | 1–1 | Chasetown (8) | 881 |
| 39 | Sutton Coldfield Town (8) | 2–2 | Abbey Hulton United (9) | 226 |
| 40 | Stamford (7) | 1–0 | Coventry Sphinx (8) | 292 |
| 41 | Corby Town (8) | 1–2 | Gainsborough Trinity (7) | 733 |
| 42 | Kidsgrove Athletic (8) | 1–2 | Racing Club Warwick (8) | 225 |
| 43 | Rushall Olympic (7) | 5–1 | Atherstone Town (9) | 349 |
| 44 | Bourne Town (8) | 0–0 | Shepshed Dynamo (8) | 403 |
| 45 | Brentwood Town (7) | 2–1 | Leighton Town (8) | 423 |
| 46 | Maldon & Tiptree (8) | 2–0 | Canvey Island (7) | 881 |
| 47 | Eynesbury Rovers (9) | 3–1 | Arlesey Town (9) | 208 |
| 48 | Enfield (8) | 3–1 | Ilford (9) | 74 |
Match played at Harlow Town
| 49 | Newmarket Town (8) | 2–3 | Woodford Town (9) | 257 |
| 50 | Witham Town (8) | 3–2 | Lowestoft Town (8) | 193 |
| 51 | Cheshunt (7) | 1–2 | Leiston (7) | 206 |
| 52 | Redbridge (8) | 1–2 | Royston Town (7) | 142 |
| 53 | March Town United (9) | 1–3 | Gorleston (8) | 230 |
| 54 | Real Bedford (7) | 1–1 | Bishop's Stortford (7) | 280 |
| 55 | Brightlingsea Regent (8) | 2–3 | Bury Town (7) | 259 |
| 56 | Billericay Town (7) | 4–1 | Barton Rovers (8) | 475 |
| 58 | Potters Bar Town (7) | 2–2 | Hitchin Town (8) | 312 |
| 59 | Berkhamsted (7) | 2–0 | St Ives Town (7) | 240 |
| 60 | Histon (9) | 2–3 | Mulbarton Wanderers (9) | 225 |
| 61 | Bowers & Pitsea (8) | 1–2 | Hertford Town (8) | 229 |
| 62 | AFC Sudbury (7) | 4–0 | Mildenhall Town (8) | 218 |
| 63 | Aylesbury Vale Dynamos (9) | 1–3 | St Albans City (7) | 407 |
| 64 | Haverhill Rovers (9) | 0–3 | Waltham Abbey (8) | 142 |
| 65 | Needham Market (7) | 4–2 | Tilbury (8) | 276 |
| 66 | Stanway Rovers (8) | 2–1 | Cockfosters (9) | 118 |
| 67 | Havant & Waterlooville (7) | 0–1 | Chichester City (7) | 405 |
| 68 | Ashford Town (Middlesex) (9) | 3–2 | AFC Whyteleafe (8) | 188 |
| 69 | Steyning Town (9) | 5–0 | Lancing (9) | 412 |
| 71 | Chertsey Town (7) | 2–1 | Thame United (8) | 423 |

| Tie | Home team (Tier) | Score | Away team (Tier) | Att. |
|---|---|---|---|---|
| 72 | Folkestone Invicta (7) | 3–0 | Sevenoaks Town (8) | 218 |
Match played at Ashford United
| 73 | Ramsgate (7) | 1–2 | Cray Valley Paper Mills (7) | 831 |
| 74 | Deal Town (8) | 2–0 | Cobham (9) | 619 |
| 76 | Raynes Park Vale (8) | 0–2 | Ashford United (8) | 298 |
| 78 | Soul Tower Hamlets (9) | 4–1 | Ascot United (8) | 80 |
| 79 | Beckenham Town (8) | 2–3 | Egham Town (8) | 141 |
| 80 | Epsom & Ewell (9) | 2–1 | Risborough Rangers (9) | 79 |
Match played at Chipstead
| 81 | Cray Wanderers (7) | 2–2 | Hanwell Town (7) | 201 |
Match played at Bromley
| 82 | Bedfont Sports (8) | 4–3 | Littlehampton Town (8) | 97 |
| 83 | Uxbridge (7) | 1–2 | Welling United (7) | 341 |
| 84 | Erith Town (8) | 0–3 | Farnham Town (7) | 160 |
Match played at Cray Valley Paper Mills
| 85 | Dulwich Hamlet (7) | 2–3 | Whitstable Town (9) | 1,681 |
| 86 | Knaphill (9) | 1–2 | Hackney Wick (9) | 138 |
| 87 | Sittingbourne (8) | 1–2 | AFC Croydon Athletic (8) | 271 |
Match played at Woodstock Sports
| 88 | Westfield (8) | 2–0 | Sheppey United (8) | 203 |
| 89 | Three Bridges (8) | 0–2 | Walton & Hersham (7) | 212 |
| 90 | Carshalton Athletic (7) | 0–0 | Wingate & Finchley (7) | 311 |
| 91 | Flackwell Heath (8) | 2–1 | Lewes (7) | 235 |
| 93 | Chatham Town (7) | 4–0 | Marlow (8) | 503 |
| 94 | Hayes & Yeading United (8) | 1–1 | Whitehawk (7) | 168 |
Match played at Maidstone United
| 95 | Didcot Town (8) | 1–1 | Poole Town (7) | 256 |
| 96 | Fairford Town (9) | 0–2 | Sholing (7) | 181 |
| 97 | Royal Wootton Bassett Town (9) | 1–3 | Torpoint Athletic (9) | 165 |
Match played at Cirencester Town
| 98 | Winchester City (8) | 0–0 | Fareham Town (8) | 294 |
| 99 | Westbury United (8) | 2–2 | Yate Town (7) | 168 |
| 100 | Slimbridge (9) | 0–1 | Dorchester Town (7) | 272 |
| 101 | Hungerford Town (7) | 3–0 | AFC Stoneham (9) | 270 |
| 102 | Tiverton Town (7) | 3–4 | Taunton Town (7) | 675 |
| 104 | Bishop's Cleeve (8) | 2–5 | Wimborne Town (7) | 217 |
| 105 | Gloucester City (7) | 1–1 | AFC Portchester (8) | 479 |
| 106 | Mangotsfield United (9) | 0–1 | Banbury United (7) | 408 |
| 107 | Gosport Borough (7) | 2–1 | Basingstoke Town (7) | 519 |
| 108 | Hythe & Dibden (9) | 1–2 | Laverstock & Ford (9) | 91 |
Match played at Blackfield & Langley
| 109 | Falmouth Town (8) | 0–5 | Brixham (8) | 281 |
| 110 | Shaftesbury (8) | 1–1 | Exmouth Town (8) | 218 |
| 111 | Plymouth Parkway (7) | 0–4 | Frome Town (8) | 249 |
| 112 | Tavistock (8) | 1–4 | Swindon Supermarine (8) | 118 |
| 70 | Bracknell Town (7) | 2–2 | Dartford (7) | 611 |
Sunday 31 August 2025
| 8 | Hallam (8) | 2–2 | Ashton United (7) | 754 |
| 77 | Wokingham Town (9) | 1–5 | Burgess Hill Town (7) | 505 |
Replays
Monday 1 September 2025
| 39R | Abbey Hulton United (9) | 2–2 (4–5 p) | Sutton Coldfield Town (8) | 395 |
Tuesday 2 September 2025
| 6R | Shildon (9) | 0–3 | Witton Albion (8) | 200 |
| 10R | Prescot Cables (7) | 0–1 | Hyde United (7) | 380 |
| 17R | Nantwich Town (8) | 2–0 | Avro (8) | 292 |
| 22R | Bootle (8) | 4–2 | Silsden (8) | 406 |
| 25R | Sporting Khalsa (8) | 2–0 | Boston Town (9) | 165 |
| 29R | Leek Town (7) | 0–3 | Harborough Town (7) | 352 |
| 35R | Stratford Town (7) | 0–3 | Halesowen Town (7) | 480 |
| 38R | Chasetown (8) | 3–2 (a.e.t.) | Worcester City (7) | 478 |
| 44R | Shepshed Dynamo (8) | 2–1 (a.e.t.) | Bourne Town (8) | 312 |
| 54R | Bishop's Stortford (7) | 1–0 | Real Bedford (7) | 387 |
| 58R | Hitchin Town (8) | 2–0 | Potters Bar Town (7) | 635 |
| 70R | Dartford (7) | 0–2 | Bracknell Town (7) | 619 |
| 75R | Hastings United (8) | 0–3 | Faversham Town (8) | 649 |
| 81R | Hanwell Town (7) | 1–0 | Cray Wanderers (7) | 269 |
| 90R | Wingate & Finchley (7) | 3–2 | Carshalton Athletic (7) | 154 |
| 95R | Poole Town (7) | 2–1 | Didcot Town (8) | 398 |
| 98R | Fareham Town (8) | 1–0 | Winchester City (8) | 307 |
| 99R | Yate Town (7) | 2–3 (a.e.t.) | Westbury United (8) | 359 |
| 105R | AFC Portchester (8) | 0–2 | Gloucester City (7) | 376 |
Wednesday 3 September 2025
| 8R | Ashton United (7) | 2–0 | Hallam (8) | 357 |
| 94R | Whitehawk (7) | 3–2 | Hayes & Yeading United (8) | 212 |
| 110R | Exmouth Town (8) | 0–2 | Shaftesbury (8) | 230 |

=== Upsets ===
| Giantkiller (tier) | Opponent (tier) |
Upset of two leagues above
| Tadley Calleva (level 9) | 4–2 at home vs Weymouth (level 7) |
| Whitstable Town (level 9) | 3–2 away vs Dulwich Hamlet (level 7) |

== Second qualifying round ==
The draw for the second qualifying round was made on 1 September 2025. This round saw all teams from Tier 6 enter the competition. Seventeen teams from Tier 9 (Ashford Town (Middlesex), Atherton Laburnum Rovers, Chadderton, Epsom & Ewell, Eynesbury Rovers, Hackney Wick, Laverstock & Ford, Mulbarton Wanderers, Newcastle Blue Star, Pickering Town, Soul Tower Hamlets, Steyning Town, Tadley Calleva, Torpoint Athletic, West Auckland Town, Whitstable Town, and Woodford Town) entered this round as the lowest ranked teams remaining in the competition.

Number of non-league teams per tier still in qualifying
| National League (Note: National League teams joined in the fourth round of qualifying) | North/South | Premier Division | Division One | Regional | Total |
|---|---|---|---|---|---|
| 24 / 24 | 48 / 48 | 55 / 88 | 41 / 84 | 16 / 52 | 184 / 296 |

| Tie | Home team (Tier) (Note: (9) represents teams allocated to divisions at the 9th tier of English football (otherwise known as Step 5 of the National League System). (8) represents the 8th tier (Step 4 NLS). (7) represents the 7th tier (Step 3 NLS). (6) represents the 6th tier (Step 2 NLS).) | Score | Away team (Tier) | Att. |
Friday 12 September 2025
| 51 | Folkestone Invicta (7) | 2–0 | Maidstone United (6) | 1,235 |
Saturday 13 September 2025
| 1 | FC United of Manchester (7) | 0–1 | Chadderton (9) | 1,669 |
| 2 | Macclesfield (6) | 3–0 | Atherton Laburnum Rovers (9) | 1,364 |
| 3 | Curzon Ashton (6) | 4–1 | Hebburn Town (7) | 198 |
| 4 | Stalybridge Celtic (8) | 1–2 | Chester (6) | 1,143 |
| 5 | Congleton Town (8) | 0–1 | Chorley (6) | 632 |
| 6 | Bootle (8) | 1–3 | Darlington (6) | 587 |
| 7 | Radcliffe (6) | 1–1 | Southport (6) | 653 |
| 8 | West Auckland Town (9) | 0–1 | Spennymoor Town (6) | 649 |
| 9 | Hyde United (7) | 2–0 | Whitby Town (7) | 477 |
| 10 | South Shields (6) | 2–1 | Guiseley (7) | 1,016 |
| 11 | Dunston (8) | 1–0 | Stocksbridge Park Steels (7) | 235 |
| 12 | Pickering Town (9) | 0–2 | Runcorn Linnets (8) | 1,026 |
| 13 | AFC Fylde (6) | 4–1 | Bamber Bridge (7) | 847 |
| 14 | Nantwich Town (8) | 3–1 | Trafford (8) | 450 |
| 15 | Newcastle Blue Star (9) | 0–2 | Marine (6) | 404 |
| 16 | Morpeth Town (7) | 2–1 | Witton Albion (8) | 274 |
| 17 | Ashton United (7) | 2–0 | Scarborough Athletic (6) | 440 |
| 18 | Racing Club Warwick (8) | 3–3 | Evesham United (7) | 446 |
| 19 | Chasetown (8) | 0–0 | Banbury United (7) | 557 |
| 20 | AFC Telford United (6) | 3–1 | Kidderminster Harriers (6) | 1,906 |
| 21 | Alvechurch (7) | 3–0 | Leamington (6) | 402 |
| 22 | Shepshed Dynamo (8) | 0–2 | Stamford (7) | 474 |
| 23 | Gainsborough Trinity (7) | 2–1 | Rushall Olympic (7) | 498 |
| 24 | Sporting Khalsa (8) | A–A (Note: The match was abandoned during the 67th minute due to racist abuse directed towards Ravan Constable (Sporting Khalsa). The score was 2–1 in favour of Hereford.) | Hereford (6) | 611 |
| 25 | Coleshill Town (8) | 0–7 | Hednesford Town (7) | 447 |
| 26 | Buxton (6) | 3–0 | Redditch United (7) | 658 |
| 27 | Spalding United (7) | 3–0 | Alfreton Town (6) | 734 |
| 28 | Quorn (7) | 2–1 | Kettering Town (7) | 757 |
| 29 | Matlock Town (8) | 3–0 | Carlton Town (8) | 507 |
| 30 | Harborough Town (7) | 3–2 | Worksop Town (6) | 633 |
| 31 | Grimsby Borough (8) | 1–1 | Halesowen Town (7) | 243 |
| 32 | Sutton Coldfield Town (8) | 3–1 | Stourbridge (7) | 335 |
| 33 | Royston Town (7) | 1–0 | Brentwood Town (7) | 409 |
| 34 | Bury Town (7) | 1–1 | Woodford Town (9) | 635 |
| 35 | Hitchin Town (8) | 1–2 | St Albans City (7) | 1,181 |
| 36 | Leiston (7) | 4–1 | Hackney Wick (9) | 175 |
| 37 | Mulbarton Wanderers (9) | 0–0 | Witham Town (8) | 338 |
| 38 | Bedford Town (6) | 1–1 | Dagenham & Redbridge (6) | 770 |
| 39 | Enfield (8) | 0–3 | Enfield Town (6) | 678 |
| 40 | Chesham United (6) | 1–4 | King's Lynn Town (6) | 492 |
| 41 | Chelmsford City (6) | 6–0 | Hertford Town (8) | 824 |
| 42 | AFC Sudbury (7) | 1–2 | Aveley (7) | 260 |
| 43 | Hemel Hempstead Town (6) | 4–1 | Bishop's Stortford (7) | 458 |
| 44 | Peterborough Sports (6) | 2–1 | Hornchurch (6) | 251 |
| 45 | Needham Market (7) | 4–2 | Eynesbury Rovers (9) | 286 |
| 46 | Waltham Abbey (8) | 2–0 | Gorleston (8) | 134 |
| 47 | Maldon & Tiptree (8) | 2–0 | Stanway Rovers (8) | 712 |
| 48 | Billericay Town (7) | 3–0 | Berkhamsted (7) | 608 |
| 49 | Ashford United (8) | 0–3 | Chatham Town (7) | 634 |

| Tie | Home team (Tier) | Score | Away team (Tier) | Att. |
|---|---|---|---|---|
| 50 | Welling United (7) | 1–1 | Slough Town (6) | 476 |
| 52 | Farnborough (6) | 4–1 | Dover Athletic (6) | 669 |
| 53 | Dorking Wanderers (6) | 7–2 | Wingate & Finchley (7) | 666 |
| 54 | Eastbourne Borough (6) | 4–0 | Epsom & Ewell (9) | 754 |
| 55 | Burgess Hill Town (7) | 1–3 | Farnham Town (7) | 512 |
Match played at Farnham Town
| 56 | Jersey Bulls (8) | 2–2 | Worthing (6) | 1,257 |
| 57 | Hanwell Town (7) | 0–1 | Bedfont Sports (8) | 329 |
| 58 | Chertsey Town (7) | 2–3 | Cray Valley Paper Mills (7) | 434 |
| 59 | Westfield (8) | 2–2 | Horsham (6) | 401 |
| 60 | Bracknell Town (7) | 2–0 | Tadley Calleva (9) | 756 |
| 61 | Whitehawk (7) | 0–2 | Walton & Hersham (7) | 229 |
| 62 | Maidenhead United (6) | 0–1 | Faversham Town (8) | 624 |
| 63 | Ebbsfleet United (6) | 5–0 | Ashford Town (Middlesex) (9) | 574 |
| 64 | Soul Tower Hamlets (9) | 0–2 | Flackwell Heath (8) | 100 |
| 65 | Deal Town (8) | 2–1 | Egham Town (8) | 576 |
| 66 | Whitstable Town (9) | 1–1 | Chichester City (7) | 702 |
| 67 | Hampton & Richmond Borough (6) | 4–2 | AFC Croydon Athletic (8) | 446 |
| 68 | Steyning Town (9) | 2–2 | Tonbridge Angels (6) | 373 |
| 69 | Fareham Town (8) | 0–3 | Sholing (7) | 442 |
| 70 | Taunton Town (7) | 1–1 | Weston-super-Mare (6) | 1,175 |
| 71 | Wimborne Town (7) | 2–1 | Bath City (6) | 682 |
| 72 | Brixham (8) | 1–3 | Dorchester Town (7) | 272 |
| 73 | Gloucester City (7) | 1–2 | Chippenham Town (6) | 765 |
| 74 | Salisbury (6) | 4–1 | Laverstock & Ford (9) | 1,760 |
| 75 | Gosport Borough (7) | 0–3 | Poole Town (7) | 891 |
| 76 | AFC Totton (6) | 2–0 | Torquay United (6) | 617 |
| 77 | Hungerford Town (7) | 3–0 | Swindon Supermarine (8) | 450 |
| 78 | Merthyr Town (6) | 4–0 | Torpoint Athletic (9) | 789 |
| 79 | Westbury United (8) | 3–2 | Oxford City (6) | 328 |
| 80 | Shaftesbury (8) | 1–1 | Frome Town (8) | 343 |
Tuesday 23 September 2025
| 24 | Sporting Khalsa (8) | 2–3 (a.e.t.) | Hereford (6) | 421 |
Replays
Tuesday 16 September 2025
| 7R | Southport (6) | 3–2 | Radcliffe (6) | 787 |
| 18R | Evesham United (7) | 1–0 | Racing Club Warwick (8) | 468 |
| 19R | Banbury United (7) | 1–1 (5–3 p) | Chasetown (8) | 408 |
| 31R | Halesowen Town (7) | 6–1 | Grimsby Borough (8) | 695 |
| 37R | Witham Town (8) | 2–0 | Mulbarton Wanderers (9) | |
| 38R | Dagenham & Redbridge (6) | 1–0 | Bedford Town (6) | 636 |
| 50R | Slough Town (6) | 1–0 | Welling United (7) | 450 |
| 56R | Worthing (6) | 5–0 | Jersey Bulls (8) | 977 |
| 59R | Horsham (6) | 6–0 | Westfield (8) | 594 |
| 66R | Chichester City (7) | 0–1 | Whitstable Town (9) | 403 |
| 68R | Tonbridge Angels (6) | 6–1 | Steyning Town (9) | 373 |
| 70R | Weston-super-Mare (6) | 3–0 | Taunton Town (7) | 1,014 |
Wednesday 17 September 2025
| 34R | Woodford Town (9) | 1–0 (a.e.t.) | Bury Town (7) | 279 |
| 80R | Frome Town (8) | 1–1 (5–3 p) | Shaftesbury (8) | 393 |

=== Upsets ===
| Giantkiller (tier) | Opponent (tier) |
Upset of two leagues above
| Faversham Town (level 8) | 1–0 away vs Maidenhead United (level 6) |
| Westbury United (level 8) | 3–2 at home vs Oxford City (level 6) |
| Chadderton (level 9) | 1–0 away vs FC United of Manchester (level 7) |
| Whitstable Town (level 9) | 1–0 away vs Chichester City (level 7) |
| Woodford Town (level 9) | 1–0 at home vs Bury Town (level 7) |

== Third qualifying round ==
The draw for the third qualifying round was made on 15 September 2025. Chadderton, Whitstable Town and Woodford Town from Tier 9 were the lowest ranked teams remaining in the competition.

Number of non-league teams per tier still in qualifying
| National League (Note: National League teams joined in the fourth round of qualifying) | North/South | Premier Division | Division One | Regional | Total |
|---|---|---|---|---|---|
| 24 / 24 | 33 / 48 | 30 / 88 | 14 / 84 | 3 / 52 | 104 / 296 |

| Tie | Home team (Tier) (Note: (9) represents teams allocated to divisions at the 9th tier of English football (otherwise known as Step 5 of the National League System). (8) represents the 8th tier (Step 4 NLS). (7) represents the 7th tier (Step 3 NLS). (6) represents the 6th tier (Step 2 NLS).) | Score | Away team (Tier) | Att. |
Saturday 27 September 2025
| 35 | Westbury United (8) | 0–1 | Farnborough (6) | 1,526 |
| 1 | Chester (6) | 5–1 | Curzon Ashton (6) | 1,740 |
| 2 | AFC Fylde (6) | 2–2 | Darlington (6) | 703 |
| 3 | Runcorn Linnets (8) | 1–1 | Ashton United (7) | 651 |
| 4 | Spennymoor Town (6) | 3–0 | Chadderton (9) | 667 |
| 5 | Morpeth Town (7) | 1–3 | Southport (6) | 375 |
| 6 | Macclesfield (6) | 2–0 | Nantwich Town (8) | 1,387 |
| 7 | Dunston (8) | 1–2 | Gainsborough Trinity (7) | 440 |
| 8 | South Shields (6) | 4–1 | Chorley (6) | 990 |
| 9 | Marine (6) | 2–3 | Buxton (6) | 911 |
| 10 | Hyde United (7) | 1–0 | Matlock Town (8) | 648 |
| 11 | Leiston (7) | 0–3 | Banbury United (7) | 236 |
| 12 | Enfield Town (6) | 5–1 | Quorn (7) | 701 |
| 13 | Needham Market (7) | 2–1 | Witham Town (8) | 298 |
| 14 | Woodford Town (9) | 0–1 | St Albans City (7) | 477 |
| 15 | Waltham Abbey (8) | 2–4 | Maldon & Tiptree (8) | 335 |
| 16 | Harborough Town (7) | 4–1 | Peterborough Sports (6) | 909 |
| 17 | Alvechurch (7) | 1–2 | Chelmsford City (6) | 431 |
| 18 | Spalding United (7) | 2–1 | Dagenham & Redbridge (6) | 925 |
| 19 | Hednesford Town (7) | 0–0 | Billericay Town (7) | 2,016 |
| 20 | Royston Town (7) | 1–5 | King's Lynn Town (6) | 819 |
| 21 | AFC Telford United (6) | 4–1 | Evesham United (7) | 1,338 |
| 22 | Halesowen Town (7) | 0–0 | Aveley (7) | 1,131 |
| 23 | Hemel Hempstead Town (6) | 2–2 | Hereford (6) | 706 |
| 24 | Sutton Coldfield Town (8) | 0–1 | Stamford (7) | 379 |
| 25 | Wimborne Town (7) | 0–3 | Worthing (6) | 852 |

| Tie | Home team (Tier) | Score | Away team (Tier) | Att. |
|---|---|---|---|---|
| 26 | Farnham Town (7) | 3–0 | Dorchester Town (7) | 798 |
| 27 | Ebbsfleet United (6) | 2–1 | Faversham Town (8) | 874 |
| 28 | Whitstable Town (9) | 2–0 | Hungerford Town (7) | 971 |
| 29 | Cray Valley Paper Mills (7) | 0–0 | Tonbridge Angels (6) | 470 |
| 30 | Bedfont Sports (8) | 1–2 | Slough Town (6) | 368 |
| 31 | Merthyr Town (6) | 0–1 | Hampton & Richmond Borough (6) | 692 |
| 32 | Sholing (7) | 1–2 | Eastbourne Borough (6) | 183 |
Match played at AFC Portchester
| 33 | Horsham (6) | 2–3 | Folkestone Invicta (7) | 993 |
| 34 | Salisbury (6) | 1–1 | Dorking Wanderers (6) | 770 |
| 36 | Poole Town (7) | 0–2 | Weston-super-Mare (6) | 603 |
| 37 | AFC Totton (6) | 4–2 | Frome Town (8) | 436 |
| 38 | Flackwell Heath (8) | 1–1 | Bracknell Town (7) | 556 |
| 39 | Walton & Hersham (7) | 0–2 | Chippenham Town (6) | 904 |
| 40 | Chatham Town (7) | 3–1 | Deal Town (8) | 511 |
Replays
Monday 29 September 2025
| 22R | Aveley (7) | 1–0 | Halesowen Town (7) | 227 |
Tuesday 30 September 2025
| 2R | Darlington (6) | 3–1 | AFC Fylde (6) | 1,037 |
| 3R | Ashton United (7) | 1–2 | Runcorn Linnets (8) | 442 |
| 19R | Billericay Town (7) | 2–0 | Hednesford Town (7) | 636 |
| 23R | Hereford (6) | 0–3 | Hemel Hempstead Town (6) | 1,307 |
| 29R | Tonbridge Angels (6) | 5–0 | Cray Valley Paper Mills (7) | 572 |
| 34R | Dorking Wanderers (6) | 4–2 | Salisbury (6) | |
| 38R | Bracknell Town (7) | 0–3 | Flackwell Heath (8) | 431 |

=== Upsets ===
| Giantkiller (tier) | Opponent (tier) |
Upset of two leagues above
| Whitstable Town (level 9) | 2–0 at home vs Hungerford Town (level 7) |

== Fourth qualifying round ==
The draw for the fourth qualifying round was made on 29 September 2025. Whitstable Town, from Tier 9, is the lowest ranked team to progress to this round.

Number of non-league teams per tier still in qualifying
| National League | North/South | Premier Division | Division One | Regional | Total |
|---|---|---|---|---|---|
| 24 / 24 | 23 / 48 | 13 / 88 | 3 / 84 | 1 / 52 | 64 / 296 |

| Tie | Home team (Tier) (Note: (9) represents teams allocated to divisions at the 9th tier of English football (otherwise known as Step 5 of the National League System). (8) represents the 8th tier (Step 4 NLS). (7) represents the 7th tier (Step 3 NLS). (6) represents the 6th tier (Step 2 NLS). (5) represents the 5th tier (Step 1 NLS).) | Score | Away team (Tier) | Att. |
Saturday 11 October 2025
| 32 | Farnham Town (7) | 3–3 | Sutton United (5) | 2,300 |
| 1 | Darlington (6) | 0–6 | AFC Telford United (6) | 2,042 |
| 2 | Macclesfield (6) | 1–0 | Stamford (7) | 1,605 |
| 3 | Gainsborough Trinity (7) | 1–1 | Hartlepool United (5) | 1,487 |
| 4 | Carlisle United (5) | 5–2 | Boston United (5) | 3,453 |
| 5 | Rochdale (5) | 1–2 | York City (5) | 2,981 |
| 6 | Runcorn Linnets (8) | 0–1 | Buxton (6) | 1,600 |
| 7 | Morecambe (5) | 1–1 | Chester (6) | 3,066 |
| 8 | South Shields (6) | 4–0 | Spalding United (7) | 1,526 |
| 9 | Tamworth (5) | 1–0 | Hyde United (7) | 1,571 |
| 10 | Scunthorpe United (5) | 4–2 | King's Lynn Town (6) | 2,261 |
| 11 | Aveley (7) | 0–3 | Gateshead (5) | 407 |
| 12 | Spennymoor Town (6) | 1–0 | Billericay Town (7) | 1,090 |
| 13 | Southport (6) | 1–3 | FC Halifax Town (5) | 2,194 |
| 14 | Altrincham (5) | 2–2 | Harborough Town (7) | 1,812 |
| 16 | Maldon & Tiptree (8) | 1–0 | Flackwell Heath (8) | 1,505 |
| 17 | Woking (5) | 1–1 | Brackley Town (5) | 1,415 |
| 18 | Wealdstone (5) | 5–1 | Whitstable Town (9) | 1,152 |
| 19 | Slough Town (6) | 3–2 | Enfield Town (6) | 1,207 |
| 20 | Eastbourne Borough (6) | 0–3 | Boreham Wood (5) | 1,019 |
| 21 | Hampton & Richmond Borough (6) | 0–2 | Eastleigh (5) | 1,354 |
| 22 | Southend United (5) | 4–1 | Folkestone Invicta (7) | 3,507 |

| Tie | Home team (Tier) | Score | Away team (Tier) | Att. |
|---|---|---|---|---|
| 23 | Ebbsfleet United (6) | 2–0 | Solihull Moors (5) | 849 |
| 24 | Braintree Town (5) | 2–0 | Farnborough (6) | 606 |
| 25 | Tonbridge Angels (6) | 1–3 | Chatham Town (7) | 1,463 |
| 26 | Weston-super-Mare (6) | 1–0 | Needham Market (7) | 1,046 |
| 27 | Hemel Hempstead Town (6) | 2–1 | Yeovil Town (5) | 1,751 |
| 28 | Banbury United (7) | 1–1 | St Albans City (7) | 1,598 |
| 29 | Chelmsford City (6) | 4–3 | Chippenham Town (6) | 1,295 |
| 30 | AFC Totton (6) | 1–1 | Truro City (5) | 905 |
| 31 | Dorking Wanderers (6) | 2–3 | Aldershot Town (5) | |
Monday 13 October 2025
| 15 | Worthing (6) | 1–4 | Forest Green Rovers (5) | 3,033 |
Replays
Tuesday 14 October 2025
| 3R | Hartlepool United (5) | 1–3 | Gainsborough Trinity (7) | 1,267 |
| 7R | Chester (6) | 2–0 | Morecambe (5) | 2,979 |
| 14R | Harborough Town (7) | 0–3 (a.e.t.) | Altrincham (5) | 1,813 |
| 17R | Brackley Town (5) | 6–2 | Woking (5) | 661 |
| 28R | St Albans City (7) | 1–0 (a.e.t.) | Banbury United (7) | 1,851 |
| 30R | Truro City (5) | 1–1 (3–5 p) | AFC Totton (6) | 1,026 |
| 32R | Sutton United (5) | 3–2 (a.e.t.) | Farnham Town (7) | 1,496 |

Number of non-league teams per tier that qualified for the competition
| National League | North/South | Premier Division | Division One | Regional | Total |
|---|---|---|---|---|---|
| 16 / 24 | 12 / 48 | 3 / 88 | 1 / 84 | 0 / 52 | 32 / 296 |

=== Upsets ===
| Giantkiller (tier) | Opponent (tier) |
Upset of two leagues above
| Gainsborough Trinity (level 7) | 3–1 away vs Hartlepool United (level 5) |

== Broadcasting ==
The qualifying rounds were not covered by the FA Cup's broadcasting contracts held by TNT Sports and BBC Sport for the competition proper, although one game per round was broadcast by the BBC on its media platforms. This year, the BBC started with the first qualifying round. This meant that the preliminary round was not shown for the first time since live qualifying matches began on the BBC.

| Round | Tie | Broadcaster |
|---|---|---|
| First qualifying round | Tadley Calleva v Weymouth | BBC Sport |
| Second qualifying round | Pickering Town v Runcorn Linnets | BBC Sport |
| Third qualifying round | Westbury United v Farnborough | BBC Sport |
| Fourth qualifying round | Farnham Town v Sutton United | BBC Sport |
| Fourth qualifying round | Worthing v Forest Green Rovers | TNT Sports |
