= Zak Ansah =

English footballer (born 1994)

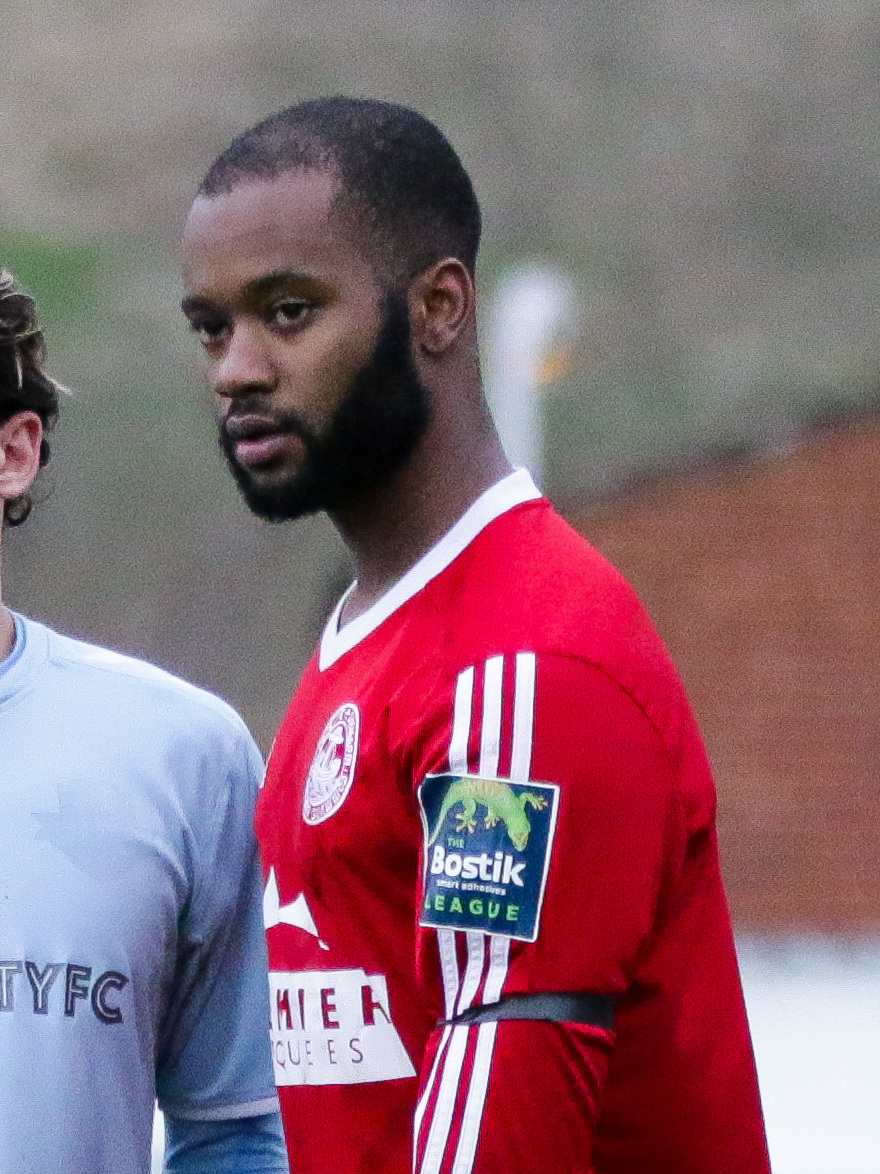
- Ansah in 2018

Personal information
- Full name: Zak Andy Ansah
- Date of birth: 4 May 1994 (age 32)
- Place of birth: Sidcup, England
- Height: 1.79 m (5 ft 10 1/2 in)
- Position: Striker

Team information
- Current team: SE Dons

Youth career
- 2004–2014: Arsenal
- 2014–2015: Charlton Athletic

Senior career*
Years	Team	Apps	(Gls)
2015–2016	Charlton Athletic	0	(0)
2015	→ Plymouth Argyle (loan)	8	(1)
2015	→ Newport County (loan)	13	(2)
2016–2017	Woking	11	(1)
2018–2019	Hythe Town	55	(46)
2019–2022	Herne Bay	78	(49)
2022–2023	Faversham Town	11	(2)
2023	Welling Town	4	(0)
2024–2025	Forest Hill Park		
2025–	SE Dons		

International career^{‡}
2009	England U16	4	(3)
2011	England U17	3	(1)
- * Club domestic league appearances and goals as of 16:46, 3 April 2025 (UTC) ‡ National team caps and goals as of 16:10, 8 April 2015 (UTC)

Zak Andy Ansah (born 4 May 1994) is an English professional footballer who plays as a striker for Southern Counties East League Premier Division club SE Dons.

== Club career ==
Ansah, the son of former Southend United player Andy Ansah, had spells with Sydenham Sports club and Charlton Athletic before joining the academy at Arsenal at the age of 10, who beat off interest from several other London-based clubs including Tottenham Hotspur and AFC Wimbledon. Ansah made his way through the club's youth system, making his debut for their under-18 side at the age of just 14 and later impressing in the NextGen Series youth competition.

On 4 December 2012, with Arsenal already qualified for the next round of the competition, Ansah was named as a substitute for the club's Champions League group stage match against Olympiacos but remained on the bench during a 2–1 defeat. He suffered a tear of his ACL in July 2013 that ruled him out for eight months, the second time he had suffered the injury, but returned to the development squad in March 2014, scoring in a 5–3 win over West Ham United. At the end of the 2013–14 season, Ansah was released by Arsenal without making a first-team appearance.

Ansah subsequently joined Football League Championship side Charlton Athletic on a two-year deal, working with under-21 development manager Jason Euell. In March 2015, he joined Football League Two side Plymouth Argyle until the end of the 2014–15 season, scoring on his debut for the club, the third goal in a 3–0 win over Cheltenham Town. He then scored Plymouth Argyle's first goal of their League 2 Play-off tie with Wycombe Wanderers at Home Park, his goal making the scoreline 3–1 in Wycombe's favour at the time. He made a total of 10 appearances for the club, scoring twice.

In August 2015, Ansah returned to League Two, joining Newport County on an initial one-month loan deal, making his debut in a 3–2 defeat to Leyton Orient. At the end of that loan period he returned to Charlton before rejoining Newport County for a second loan on 9 October 2015. On 24 October 2015 he scored his first two goals for Newport in a 4–1 win over Bristol Rovers. He returned to Charlton when his loan ended on 12 December 2015.

On 3 August 2016, Ansah joined Surrey-based side Woking for the 2016–17 National League season. Three days later, Ansah made his Woking debut in a 3–1 home defeat against Lincoln City, playing the full 90 minutes. On 9 August 2016, Ansah scored his first Woking goal in a 2–2 draw with Solihull Moors, netting Woking's second. After suffering a long-term knee injury in October 2016, Ansah was forced out of the Woking team until March 2017. Returning in the Cards' 2–1 defeat against North Ferriby United, replacing Ismail Yakubu in the 73rd minute. On 23 May 2017, it was announced that Ansah would leave Woking upon the expiry of his current deal in June 2017.

Following his release from Woking, Ansah had a spell in Sunday league football, before joining Isthmian League Division One South side, Hythe Town. He went onto score twice on his Hythe debut during their league tie against East Grinstead Town, which resulted in a 3–2 victory. By March 2018, Ansah registered his tenth and eleventh goals of the season in the space of three months, inspiring a two-goal comeback against Whyteleafe. Following the conclusion of the 2017–18 campaign, Ansah registered his tally to 20 goals, after netting thirteen times in ten consecutive games. On 6 June 2018, Ansah agreed a new one-year deal with Hythe.

Despite interest from Football League and National League sides, Ansah opted to join fellow Isthmian League side, Herne Bay, while also playing for fast-growing Sunday league club SE Dons.

On 17 November 2022, Ansah signed for Isthmian League South East side Faversham Town. Four months later, he joined Welling Town of the Southern Counties East League.

In July 2024, Ansah made the step into the football pyramid with SE Dons following an agreement with Forest Hill Park.

== International career ==
Ansah has represented England at both Under-16 and Under-17 level. In 2012, at the age of 18, Ansah was called up to the Ghana under-20 side for the first time but both Ansah and his father Andy blasted the Ghana Football Association stating that they had not been notified of the call-up and had discovered it after a family friend had messaged to congratulate him. Ansah later committed his international future to Ghana and, the following year, he was called up to the provisional under-20 training squad to train with a view to being included in the squad for the 2013 FIFA U-20 World Cup but was later omitted from the final squad.

== Career statistics ==
As of 29 March 2025.

Club	Season	League			FA Cup		League Cup		Other		Total	
Club	Season	Division	Apps	Goals	Apps	Goals	Apps	Goals	Apps	Goals	Apps	Goals
Charlton Athletic	2014–15	Championship	0	0	0	0	0	0	0	0	0	0
Charlton Athletic	2015–16	Championship	0	0	0	0	0	0	0	0	0	0
Charlton Athletic	Total		0	0	0	0	0	0	0	0	0	0
Plymouth Argyle (loan)	2014–15	League Two	8	1	0	0	0	0	2 (Note: Appearances in the Football League Trophy)	1	10	2
Newport County (loan)	2015–16	League Two	13	2	2	0	0	0	1	0	16	2
Woking	2016–17	National League	11	1	0	0	—		0	0	11	1
Hythe Town	2017–18	Isthmian League Division One South	19	20	—		—		—		19	20
Hythe Town	2018–19	Isthmian League South East Division	36	26	2	2	—		4 (Note: Two appearances and two goals in the Alan Turvey Trophy, two appearances and one goal in the FA Trophy)	3	42	31
Hythe Town	Total		55	46	2	2	—		4	3	61	51
Herne Bay	2019–20	Isthmian League South East Division	28	24	3	3	—		5 (Note: Four appearances and one goal in the Alan Turvey Trophy, one appearance in the FA Trophy)	1	37	28
Herne Bay	2020–21	Isthmian League South East Division	6	3	1	0	—		2 (Note: Appearances in the FA Trophy)	1	9	4
Herne Bay	2021–22	Isthmian League South East Division	37	22	1	0	—		7 (Note: Two appearances and one goal in the FA Trophy, three appearances and one goal in the Alan Turvey Trophy, two appearances and one goal in the Isthmian League South East Division play-offs)	3	45	25
Herne Bay	2022–23	Isthmian League Premier Division	7	0	2	0	—		0	0	9	0
Herne Bay	Total		78	49	7	3	—		14	5	99	57
Faversham Town	2022–23	Isthmian League South East Division	11	2	—		—		—		11	2
Welling Town	2022–23	Southern Counties East League Premier Division	4	0	—		—		—		4	0
Forest Hill Park	2024–25	Southern Counties East League Premier Division	18	3	0	0	—		4 (Note: Appearances in the Southern Counties East League Challenge Cup)	0	22	3
AFC Whyteleafe (dual-reg.)	2024–25	Combined Counties League Premier Division South	0	0	—		—		1 (Note: Appearances in the FA Vase)	0	1	0
Total			192	105	11	5	0	0	26	9	235	119
