= Connor Dymond =

English footballer

Personal information
- Full name: Connor William Dymond
- Date of birth: 12 September 1994 (age 32)
- Place of birth: Greenwich, England
- Height: 1.75 m (5 ft 9 in)
- Position: Midfielder

Team information
- Current team: Snodland Town (player-manager); Dartford Women (manager)

Youth career
- –2013: Crystal Palace

Senior career*
Years	Team	Apps	(Gls)
2013–2016	Crystal Palace	0	(0)
2014	→ Barnet (loan)	6	(1)
2016	→ Newport County (loan)	1	(0)
2016–2017	Bromley	34	(0)
2017–2018	Welling United	36	(0)
2018	Hemel Hempstead Town	2	(0)
2018	Kingstonian	14	(0)
2018–2019	Margate	22	(0)
2019–2020	Welling United	23	(1)
2020–2023	Cray Valley Paper Mills	57	(4)
2023	Herne Bay	16	(0)
2023–2024	Ashford United	25	(1)
2024	Sporting Club Thamesmead	2	(0)
2024	Hollands & Blair	5	(0)
2024–2025	VCD Athletic	25	(1)
2025–	Snodland Town	28	(0)

Managerial career
- 2022–: Dartford Women
- 2026–: Snodland Town
- * Club domestic league appearances and goals as of 19:42, 6 September 2026 (UTC)

Connor William Dymond (born 12 September 1994) is an English professional football manager and player who plays as a midfielder for Southern Counties East League Premier Division Snodland Town, where he also serves as manager. He also manages FA Women's National League Division One South East club Dartford.

== Career ==
Dymond began his career with Crystal Palace, moving on loan to Barnet in March 2014. After captaining the Crystal Palace under–21 team, he was offered a new contract by the club in May 2015. In January 2016 he joined Newport County on a one-month loan. Following his release from the Eagles, Dymond signed for Bromley on 5 August 2016. At the end of the season, Dymond departed the club, having made 34 National League appearances. Dymond joined Welling United for the 2017–18 season. He played for Hemel Hempstead Town in August 2018 and then joined Kingstonian later in the month. In December 2018 he moved to Margate. Dymond agreed to stay with Margate for the 2019–20 season but re-joined Welling before the start of the season. Dymond joined Cray Valley Paper Mills on 2 August 2020. Dymond's next two clubs were both managed by his former Cray Valley Paper Mills manager, Kevin Watson: in January 2023 Dymond signed for Herne Bay then in May 2023 he signed with Ashford United. In June 2024, he joined Southern Counties East Football League Premier Division club VCD Athletic.

Dymond joined Snodland Town for the 2025–26 season and was appointed player-manager at the end of the season. He has also managed Dartford Women since 2022.

== Career statistics ==
As of match played 15 April 2023

Appearances and goals by club, season and competition
Club	Season	League			FA Cup		League Cup		Other		Total	
Club	Season	Division	Apps	Goals	Apps	Goals	Apps	Goals	Apps	Goals	Apps	Goals
Crystal Palace	2013–14	Premier League	0	0	0	0	0	0	0	0	0	0
Crystal Palace	2014–15	Premier League	0	0	0	0	0	0	0	0	0	0
Crystal Palace	2015–16	Premier League	0	0	0	0	0	0	0	0	0	0
Crystal Palace	Total		0	0	0	0	0	0	0	0	0	0
Barnet (loan)	2013–14	Conference Premier	6	1	0	0	0	0	0	0	6	1
Newport County (loan)	2015–16	League Two	1	0	1	0	0	0	0	0	2	0
Bromley	2016–17	National League	34	0	0	0	—		3 (Note: Appearances in the FA Trophy)	0	37	0
Welling United	2017–18	National League South	36	0	0	0	—		0	0	36	0
Hemel Hempstead Town	2018–19	National League South	2	0	0	0	—		0	0	2	0
Kingstonian	2018–19	Isthmian League Premier Division	14	0	0	0	1	1	2 (Note: One appearance in the FA Trophy; one appearance and one goal in the Surrey Senior Cup)	1	17	2
Margate	2018–19	Isthmian League Premier Division	22	0	0	0	—		0	0	22	0
Welling United	2019–20	National League South	23	1	2	0	—		1	0	26	1
Cray Valley Paper Mills	2020–21	Isthmian League South East Division	4	0	6	4	—		0	0	10	4
Cray Valley Paper Mills	2021–22	Isthmian League South East Division	36 (Note: Includes one appearance in league promotion play-offs)	4	1	0	3	0	1	0	41	4
Cray Valley Paper Mills	2022–23	Isthmian League South East Division	18	0	3	0	0	0	3	1	24	1
Cray Valley Paper Mills	Total		58	4	10	4	3	0	4	1	75	9
Herne Bay	2022–23	Isthmian League Premier Division	16	2	0	0	—		0	0	16	2
Ashford United	2023–24	Isthmian League South East Division	25	1	2	1	—		6 (Note: One appearance in Kent Senior Cup, two appearances in FA Trophy, three appearances in Alan Turvey Trophy)	0	33	2
VCD Athletic	2024–25	SCEFL Premier Division	22	1	2	0	—		9 (Note: Four appearances in FA Vase, three appearances in SCEFL Challenge Cup, two appearances and one goal in SCEFL Premier Division play-offs)	1	33	2
VCD Athletic	2025–26	Isthmian League South East Division	3	0	2	0	—		0	0	5	0
VCD Athletic	Total		25	1	4	0	0	0	9	1	38	2
Career total			262	10	19	5	4	1	25	3	310	19
