= Charlie Sheringham =

English footballer (born 1988)

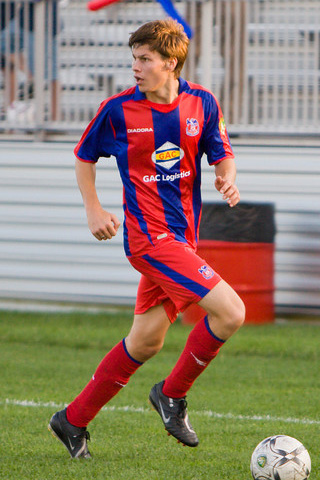
- Sheringham playing for Crystal Palace Baltimore in 2007

Personal information
- Full name: Charles Edward William Sheringham
- Date of birth: 17 April 1988 (age 38)
- Place of birth: Chingford, London, England
- Height: 6 ft 1 in (1.85 m)
- Position: Striker

Team information
- Current team: Snodland Town

Youth career
- Millwall
- ?–2004: Tottenham Hotspur
- 2004–2005: Ipswich Town

Senior career*
Years	Team	Apps	(Gls)
2006–2008	Crystal Palace	0	(0)
2007	→ Crystal Palace Baltimore (loan)	9	(1)
2008	Cambridge City	5	(6)
2008–2009	Welling United	39	(19)
2009–2010	Bishop's Stortford	28	(17)
2010	→ Histon (loan)	15	(0)
2010–2011	Dartford	46	(30)
2011–2013	AFC Bournemouth	6	(1)
2013	→ Dartford (loan)	10	(4)
2013–2014	AFC Wimbledon	15	(1)
2014	→ Salisbury City (loan)	9	(5)
2014–2017	Ebbsfleet United	49	(11)
2014–2015	→ Bishop's Stortford (loan)	4	(1)
2017	→ Hemel Hempstead Town (loan)	11	(9)
2017	Hemel Hempstead Town	16	(6)
2017–2018	Saif Sporting Club	10	(6)
2018	Hemel Hempstead Town	4	(0)
2018–2021	Dartford	45	(17)
2020	→ Leatherhead (loan)	3	(2)
2020–2021	→ Chelmsford City (loan)	4	(5)
2021–2022	Chelmsford City	33	(9)
2022–2024	Dartford	31	(6)
2024	Hollands & Blair	5	(3)
2025	Waltham Abbey	4	(0)
2025	→ Snodland Town (dual-registration)	2	(2)
2025–	Snodland Town	9	(8)
- * Club domestic league appearances and goals as of 15:11, 10 January 2026 (UTC)

Charles Edward William Sheringham (born 17 April 1988) is an English professional footballer who plays as a striker for Southern Counties East League Premier Division club Snodland Town. He is the son of former England forward Teddy Sheringham.

== Club career ==
=== Early career ===
Sheringham was born in Chingford, London, while his father Teddy was playing for Millwall. Sheringham followed in his father's footsteps by also progressing through Millwall's academy set–up, but he subsequently moved on to another of his father's former teams, Tottenham Hotspur. Having been released by "Spurs", Sheringham was given a trial at AFC Bournemouth which proved unsuccessful. On 11 October 2004, it was announced that the 16-year–old striker had been offered a trial at Championship side Ipswich Town. He was a member of the team that won the 2004–05 FA Youth Cup by beating Southampton 3–2 on aggregate on 23 April 2005 in front of a crowd of 14,889 at Portman Road, coming on as a 71st minute substitute for Danny Haynes. The young striker's performance impressed manager Joe Royle enough for him to be offered a one–year contract on 11 May 2005.

He was transferred to Charlton Athletic on a free transfer but failed to make an impact and was very soon released, after which he went on trial at Crystal Palace, playing several games for Kit Symons's reserve side. He impressed, and was kept on for the pre–season by manager Peter Taylor, scoring in a first team pre–season friendly at Stevenage Borough. He also impressed against the American Major League Soccer champions Los Angeles Galaxy which led to him being given a professional contract, on a month–by–month deal. He then impressed even further, and was given a full contract, lasting two years.

On 18 April 2007, Sheringham flew out to America with teammate Lewwis Spence to join Crystal Palace's feeder club Crystal Palace Baltimore on loan for four months, though he had to fly home early with a hairline fracture of the foot.

Sheringham was released at the end of the January 2008 transfer window without making a single first team appearance for "The Eagles". Following his release from Crystal Palace Sheringham headed to Denmark on an eight–day trial at Fremad Amager of the Danish 1st Division. The trial was set up by Teddy Sheringham, an old friend of Fremad Amager manager Jakob Friis-Hansen. However, the move fell through at the last minute.

=== Non–League career ===
Following the move to Denmark falling through, Sheringham had a brief, though successful, spell at Conference South side Cambridge City where he scored six league goals in only five league games. His impressive goal scoring tally attracted interest from fellow Conference South team Welling United and he signed for the club at the start of the 2008–09 season. Sheringham was Welling's top scorer that season, scoring 26 goals in all competitions of which 19 were in the league.

Sheringham then signed for another Conference South side, Bishop's Stortford on 15 May 2009. Once again he proved to be a great goal scorer by scoring 17 league goals in 28 league games for "The Bishops". His form attracted Conference side Histon and on 12 February 2010 Sheringham moved to Histon on loan until the end of the 2009–10 season. However, he failed to score in the loan period which saw him make 15 appearances for the club. On 17 June 2010, Sheringham signed for Conference South side Dartford. Here Sheringham rediscovered his goal scoring form, netting 30 league goals in 46 league games.

=== Football League career ===
==== AFC Bournemouth ====
His impressive form for Dartford attracted interest from League One side Bournemouth. In October 2011 he signed for Bournemouth on an 18-month contract. He made his Football League debut for the south coast club on 25 October 2011, coming on as a late substitute, against Colchester United. He scored his first football league goal in his sixth appearance against Brentford on Boxing Day 2011. The game, which would end up being his last for Bournemouth, ended 1–1. Following the Brentford game Sheringham suffered a severe foot injury and underwent surgery in October 2012. On 20 March 2013, he rejoined Conference side Dartford on an initial one-month loan deal. Three days later he scored in his first match back at the club, a 3–0 win against Gateshead. During the loan spell Sheringham played 10 games and scored four goals. He returned to Bournemouth after the last game of the 2012–13 Conference season on 20 April. Nine days later, on 29 April 2013, he was released by the newly promoted club.

==== AFC Wimbledon ====
On 21 June 2013, he joined League Two side AFC Wimbledon on a free transfer.

=== Return to non-League ===
On 21 March 2014, Sheringham joined Conference Premier side Salisbury City on a short-term loan from AFC Wimbledon, making his debut as a 65th minute substitute against Wrexham. Sheringham scored his first goal for the club two weeks later: a last minute penalty in a 1–1 draw against Kidderminster Harriers. Sheringham went on to score 4 more goals for the club in the final 6 games of the 2013/14 season.

On 30 June 2014, Sheringham joined Conference South side Ebbsfleet United on a two-year contract, following his release by AFC Wimbledon.

After a successful loan spell with Hemel Hempstead during the 2016–17 season, Sheringham made the switch permanent following his release from Ebbsfleet United.

=== Saif Sporting Club ===
On 9 November 2017, Sheringham joined Bangladesh Premier League side Saif Sporting Club following a successful trial. On 13 November 2017, Charlie scored his first goal for the club on his debut against Dhaka Abahani where his team was victorious by 2–1 margin. He finished the season with six goals in 10 appearances, helping Saif to fourth place in the league, and qualification for the preliminary round of the 2018 AFC Cup.

=== Return to England ===
On 13 June 2018, it was announced that Sheringham had returned to Hemel Hempstead for the start of the 2018–19 season.

On 31 August 2018, it was announced that Sheringham had signed for Dartford, five years after his loan spell at the club. On 21 February 2020, Sheringham joined Leatherhead on a dual registration until the end of the 2019–20 season. On 26 November 2020, Sheringham signed for Chelmsford City on a six-week loan deal.

On 5 June 2021, Chelmsford City announced Sheringham had returned to the club on a permanent deal.

On 2 July 2022, Sheringham returned to Dartford for a fourth spell at the club.

In August 2024, Sheringham joined Southern Counties East Football League Premier Division club Hollands & Blair. After three goals in six appearances in all competitions for Hollands & Blair, Sheringham signed for Isthmian League North Division side Waltham Abbey, making his debut in March 2025. He also featured for Snodland Town in the final months of the 2024–25 season.

== Coaching career ==
During his time at Ebbsfleet, Sheringham was also working as a coach at Crystal Palace. In September 2019, following coaching roles in the academies at Crystal Palace and West Ham United, Sheringham was appointed in a P.E teaching role at Forest School – the school he attended from 1999 to 2004.

== Honours ==
Ipswich Town

- FA Youth Cup: 2004–05
