= Andy Ansah =

English footballer

Personal information
- Full name: Andrew Owusu Ansah
- Date of birth: 19 March 1969 (age 57)
- Place of birth: Lewisham, England
- Height: 5 ft 9 in (1.75 m)
- Position: Midfielder

Youth career
- Charlton Athletic
- Crystal Palace

Senior career*
Years	Team	Apps	(Gls)
1988–1989	Dorking	10	(4)
1989–1990	Brentford	8	(2)
1990–1996	Southend United	157	(33)
1994	→ Brentford (loan)	3	(1)
1995	→ Brentford (loan)	6	(1)
1996	Peterborough United	2	(1)
1996	Gillingham	2	(0)
1996–1997	Leyton Orient	2	(0)
1997	Hayes	88	(45)
1997	Bromley	24	(12)
1997	Heybridge Swifts	32	(16)
1997–1999	Brighton & Hove Albion	25	(3)
1999–2000	Farnborough Town	14	(1)
2000–2001	Dulwich Hamlet	20	(8)
Total		393	(127)
- * Club domestic league appearances and goals

Andrew Owusu Ansah (born 19 March 1969) is an English actor and former professional footballer.

== Playing career ==
He played for six Football League teams in his career, most notably Southend United, where he played 180 games and scored 38 goals between 1990 and 1996, when they played in the new Division One following two successive promotions at the beginning of the decade. Ansah left Southend in March 1996, one year before they suffered the first of two successive relegations. Ansah was called into two Ghana squads, but did not make an appearance.

== Post-playing career ==
While working as an assistant on Wayne Rooney's Street Striker, he coined the term "unbelievable tekkers", which spurred Soccer A.M. to create a new segment showcasing a piece of skill from the week's football. In 2011, Ansah launched his debut fashion label "Tekkers" on the back of the success of the term "unbelievable tekkers" currently selling T-shirts and hoodies.

As an actor, he is known for portraying a player/assistant manager also named Andy Ansah on the fictional Harchester United football team on the television series Dream Team. In addition, he has served as a football consultant or football choreographer for other television series and films. This included choreographing the goal celebrations for the South African national football team in co-operation with Coca-Cola at the 2010 FIFA World Cup hosted in South Africa.

== Personal life ==
He has a son, Zak, who was a striker for Arsenal Academy, until 2014 when he joined Charlton Athletic, the club where the elder Ansah began his youth career.
