= Forest Hill Park F.C. =

Association football club in England

Forest Hill Park
- Full name: Forest Hill Park Football Club
- Nickname: The Forest
- Founded: 1992
- Dissolved: 2025
- Ground: Ladywell Arena, Catford
- Manager: Antonio Gonnella
Home colours	Away colours

Forest Hill Park Football Club was a football club based in Catford, London, England until 2025. They were members of the and played at the Ladywell Arena. They are now SE Dons.

== History ==
The club was established in 1992 and was named after Forest Hill and Honor Oak Park. After linking up with Lewisham Steelers, they joined the Crystal Palace and District Sunday League for the 1992–93 season. After a successful season they switched to Saturday football, entering the Bromley and District Football League. They later moved up to the South London Federation League, before switching to the South London Alliance in 2001. Following a move to the Catford Wanderers Sports Ground the club was renamed Catford Wanderers and played under the new name for two seasons before returning to the original name.

The club won Division One of the South London Alliance in 2005–06, earning promotion to the Premier Division. They went on to finish as Premier Division runners-up in the next two seasons, after which the club moved up to Division Two West of the Kent County League. They won the division in 2009–10, earning promotion to Division One West. League restructuring saw the club playing in the merged Division One in 2011–12, before the split was reinstated in 2013 and they returned to Division One West. After finishing fifth in 2014–15, the club were promoted to the Kent Invicta League, a league they had unsuccessfully applied to join when it was formed in 2011. When the league merged into the Southern Counties East League in 2016, Forest Hill Park became members of the new Division One.

In June 2024 the club formed a partnership with fellow Lewisham club SE Dons, with the name 'Forest Hill Park' being kept for all footballing competitions in the 2024–25 season, before being changed to 'SE Dons Football Club' from the 2025–26 season onwards.

== Stadium ==
The club played at Burbage Road in Dulwich during the 1990s, before returning to Lewisham. During their spell in the South London Alliance the club played at the Catford Wanderers Sports Ground, before moving to the Ladywell Arena.

== Current squad ==
As of 26 August 2024

Note: Flags indicate national team as defined under FIFA eligibility rules; some limited exceptions apply. Players may hold more than one non-FIFA nationality.

Pos.	Nation	Player
GK	ENG	Albert Penney
DF	ENG	Rolex Buiti
DF	ENG	George Edwards
DF	ENG	Salvyn Kisitu
DF	ENG	Ryan Mallett
DF	ENG	Nad Nwitua
DF	ENG	Alfie Saunders
MF	ENG	Reece Barrett
MF	ENG	Ainsley Everett
MF	ENG	Ryan King-Elliott

No.	Pos.	Nation	Player
MF	ENG	Samuel Naiwo	
MF	ENG	Ryan Palmer	
MF	ENG	Jake Rose	
MF	CYP	Jack Sammoutis	
FW	ENG	Junior Aikhionbare	
FW	GHA	Zak Ansah	
FW	ENG	Deshon Carty	
FW	ENG	Nathan Palmer	
FW	ENG	Stefan Wright	

== Honours ==
- Kent County League
  - Division Two West champions 2009–10
- South London Alliance
  - Division One champions 2005–06
- West Kent Challenge Shield
  - Winners 2010–11
