= Faversham Strike Force F.C. =

Coordinates: 51°23′57″N 0°28′02″E

Faversham Strike Force
- Full name: Faversham Strike Force Football Club
- Founded: 1999; 27 years ago
- Ground: The Belmont Ground, Whitstable, Kent
- Chairman: Mike Ellett
- Manager: Stuart Benfield
- League: Southern Counties East League Premier Division
- 2024–25: Southern Counties East League Division One, 1st of 18 (promoted)
Home colours

Faversham Strike Force Football Club is a football club based in Faversham, England. They are currently members of the Southern Counties East League Premier Division and groundshare with Whitstable Town.

== History ==
Faversham Strike Force were founded in 1999 by Gary Axford as a youth football club. In 2012, the club formed a senior team, competing in the Canterbury & District League as Faversham Harlequins. In 2013, back under the Faversham Strike Force guise, the club joined the Kent County League Division Two East, winning promotion in their first season in the league. The following season, the club joined the Division One East, winning the league. In 2015–16, Faversham Strike Force joined the Kent County League Premier Division, winning the league. In 2021, the club was admitted into the Southern Counties East League Division One. Faversham Strike Force entered the FA Vase for the first time in 2021–22. Manager Gary Axford stepped down during the 2023–24 season, the role going to his deputy Stuart Benfield. The 2024–25 saw the club promoted to the Southern Counties East League Premier Division as Division One Champions.

== Ground ==
In 2020, after six years at Sittingbourne Community College, Faversham Strike Force agreed a groundsharing agreement with Rochester United to play at the Rochester United Sports Ground, Strood. For the 2022–23 season a new groundshare would be announced with Faversham Town, which was extended to the end of the 2024–25 season during 2023.

In April 2025, the club announced a new groundshare agreement with Whitstable Town for two seasons.

== Records ==
- Best FA Cup performance: Extra preliminary round, 2025–26
- Best FA Vase performance: Third round, 2025–26
