= Snodland Town F.C. =

Association football club in England

Coordinates: 51°19′59″N 0°25′58″E

Snodland Town
- Full name: Snodland Town Football Club
- Founded: 1948
- Ground: Potyns Sports Ground, Snodland
- Chairman: Dave Jeal
- Manager: Connor Dymond
- League: Southern Counties East League Premier Division
- 2025–26: Southern Counties East League Premier Division, 12th of 19
Home colours	Away colours

Snodland Town F.C. is an English football club based in Snodland, Kent. They play in the Southern Counties East League Premier Division, at level 9 of the English football league system. The club is affiliated to the Kent County Football Association.

== History ==
The club was founded in 1948 as a boys team and known as Snodland Minors. The 1956–57 season saw the club enter a men's team into the Division 3B of the Maidstone and District Football League and winning it at the first attempt. The club then won the next division the following season and the Premier Division two seasons later. The 1963–64 season saw the club move to the Rochester league, but after 5 seasons they moved back to the Maidstone and District Football League. They stayed in the Maidstone and district league until the end of the 1991–92 season during which time they won the league twice, before moving to the Kent County League.

The 1994–95 season saw the club finish as runners up in Division 3 West of the Kent County league and gain promotion to Division Two West, and immediately win Division Two East with their first attempt. Two seasons later the club won Division One West of the league and a further two seasons followed with the club winning the Premier Division.

In 2012 the club changed its name from Snodland to Snodland Town when they merged with a local junior team called Snodland Nomads FC. The club remained in the Kent County Football League until the end of the 2015–16 season, when they joined the newly-formed Division One of the Southern Counties East League. The 2017–18 season then saw the club enter the FA Vase for the first time.

In the 2022–23 season, the club were promoted to the Southern Counties East Premier Division for the first time in their history, being crowned champions of Division 1 with two matches remaining after a 4–0 home victory over Meridian VP securing the title. The 2024–25 season saw the side win the SCEFL League Challenge Cup, defeating Forest Hill Park 5–0 in the final.

== Ground ==
The club have played at the Potyns Sports Ground since 1986.

In 2016 the club with help from the Football Stadia Improvement Fund installed floodlights at the ground.

== Club records ==
- Best league performance: 8th in Southern Counties East League Premier Division, 2023–24
- Best FA Cup performance: Second qualifying round, 2026–27
- Best FA Vase performance: Third round, 2025–26

== Honours ==
- Southern Counties East Football League
  - Division One Champions (1) 2022–23
  - Challenge Cup Winners (1) 2024–25
- Kent County League
  - Premier Division Champions (1) 1999–00
  - Division One West Champions (1) 1997–98
  - Division Two West Champions (1) 1995–96
  - ‘Bill Manklow’ Inter Regional Challenge Cup Winners (1) 2000–01
- Maidstone and District Football League
  - Premier Division champions (2) 1959–60, 1983–84
  - Division One Champions (1) 1973–74
  - Division Two A champions (1) 1957–58
  - Division Three B champions (1) 1956–57
  - Challenge Cup “B” Winners (1) 1957–58
  - Challenge Cup “A” Winners (1) 1983–84
- Rochester and District Football League
  - Quarter Century Cup Winners (1) 1963–64
- Kent Junior Cup “A”
  - Winners (1) 1961–62
- Sittingbourne and Milton Charity Cup
  - Winners (1) 1983–84
