= Welling Town F.C. =

Association football club in England

Coordinates: 51.4764°N 0.1798°E

Welling Town
- Full name: Welling Town Football Club
- Nickname: The Boots
- Founded: 2014
- Ground: Erith Leisure Centre, Erith
- Chairman: Kevin Oakes
- Manager: Kevin Oakes
- League: Southern Counties East League Division One
- 2025–26: Southern Counties East League Division One, 18th of 18

Welling Town Football Club is a football club based in Welling, London, England. They are currently members of the Southern Counties East League Division One and play at the Erith Leisure Centre in Erith.

== History ==
The club was established in 2014 by Kevin Oakes and friends as a Sunday league club. They joined Division Two of the London & Kent Suburban League, and finished third in the division in their first season, resulting in promotion to Division One. After finishing fourth in Division One the following season, the club switched to Saturday football, joining Division Three West of the Kent County League. The Sunday side continued for another two seasons.

Welling won the Barry Bundock West Kent Challenge Shield in 2016–17 and were Division Three West runners-up, earning promotion to Division Two West. They went on to win Division Two West and the Kent Junior Cup the following season, also retaining the Barry Bundock West Kent Challenge Shield. The club then successfully applied to join Division One of the Southern Counties East League for the 2018–19 season, a jump of three divisions.

In their first season in the Southern Counties East League, Welling were Division One champions, earning promotion to the Premier Division. However, after finishing bottom of the Premier Division in 2023–24, they were relegated back to Division One.

== Ground ==
The club moved to Bayliss Avenue in Thamesmead in 2017 after Thamesmead Town left the ground. In 2021 they relocated to Kent Football United's Efes Stadium in Dartford. For the 2022–23 season they moved to Chatham Town's Bauvill Stadium in Chatham, and then relocated to the Mayplace Ground of Phoenix Sports for the 2023–24 season. The club planned to move to the K Sports Cobdown complex in Aylesford on a five-year tenancy from the start of the 2024–25 season, but the agreement was later cancelled and the club started the 2024–25 season at the Erith Leisure Centre.

== Honours ==
- Southern Counties East League
  - Division One champions 2018–19
- Kent County League
  - Division Two West champions 2017–18
  - Barry Bundock West Kent Challenge Shield winners 2016–17, 2017–18
- Kent Junior Cup
  - Winners 2017–18
