= Alex Yee Ladywell Arena =

Sports arena in London, England

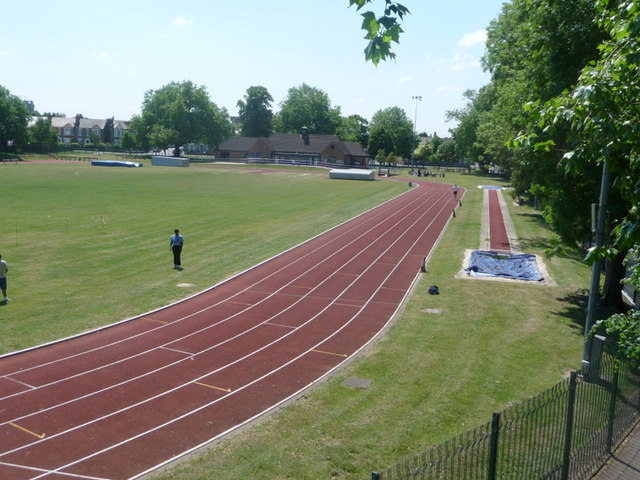
- Interactive map of Alex Yee Ladywell Arena
- Location: Catford, Lewisham, London, England
- Coordinates: 51°27′4″N 0°1′18″W

Tenants
- Kent AC; Blackheath Harriers AC; Lewisham Borough

Website
- Official website

The Alex Yee Ladywell Arena, formerly simply the Ladywell Arena, is a multiple use sports arena in Catford in Lewisham, London, England. It is used by the Kent and Blackheath Harriers athletic clubs and the Lewisham Borough football club.

On 22 November 2024, the stadium was renamed to the Alex Yee Ladywell Arena in honour of Alex Yee, an Olympic triathlete who trained on the track early in his career. The initial plan was to rename the stadium to Alex Yee Arena, but the athlete requested that "Ladywell" be retained.

== Facilities ==
The arena has a six lane 400m all weather running track, a football pitch and a gym. The stadium is also floodlit.

== Transport ==
The stadium is served by Ladywell and Catford Bridge railway stations.

London Buses services for the arena are: 47, 54, 75, 136, 181, 185, 199 and 208.

== See also ==
- Ladywell Leisure Centre
