= 2022–23 Eastern Counties Football League =

The 2022–23 season was the 80th season in the history of the Eastern Counties Football League, a football competition in England. Teams are divided into three divisions, the Premier Division at Step 5, and the geographically separated Division One North and Division One South, both at Step 6 of the English football league system.

The allocations for Steps 5 and 6 this season were announced by the Football Association and published on the league's website on 13 May 2022, subject to appeals.

Ipswich Wanderers were champions, winning their first Eastern Counties Football League title and were promoted to the Isthmian League for the first time in their history, while Thetford Town lost their inter-step play-off tie.

== Premier Division ==
Eastern Counties Football League Premier Division
- Season: 2022–23
- Champions: Ipswich Wanderers
- Promoted: Ipswich Wanderers
- Relegated: Haverhill Rovers; Whitton United
- Matches: 380
- Goals: 1,304 (3.43 per match)

The Premier Division featured 16 clubs which competed in the division last season, along with four new clubs:

- Harleston Town, promoted from Division One North
- Ipswich Wanderers, promoted from Division One South
- Sheringham, promoted from Division One North
- Soham Town Rangers, relegated from the Northern Premier League

=== League table ===
Pos	Team	Pld	W	D	L	GF	GA	GD	Pts	Promotion, qualification or relegation
1	Ipswich Wanderers	38	28	5	5	94	36	+58	89	Promoted to the Isthmian League
2	Thetford Town	38	26	4	8	102	48	+54	82	Qualified for an inter-step play-off
3	Harleston Town	38	20	10	8	73	41	+32	70	
4	Woodbridge Town	38	21	7	10	72	50	+22	70	
5	Lakenheath	38	20	8	10	79	59	+20	68	
6	Mildenhall Town	38	18	12	8	79	49	+30	66	
7	Sheringham	38	19	6	13	77	54	+23	63	
8	Norwich United	38	17	9	12	74	52	+22	60	
9	Hadleigh United	38	17	9	12	64	49	+15	60	
10	Mulbarton Wanderers	38	14	15	9	63	41	+22	57	
11	Long Melford	38	14	8	16	54	67	−13	50	
12	Newmarket Town	38	14	7	17	70	63	+7	49	
13	Brantham Athletic	38	13	9	16	60	65	−5	48	
14	Walsham-le-Willows	38	11	8	19	65	69	−4	41	
15	Soham Town Rangers	38	12	5	21	61	71	−10	41	
16	Kirkley & Pakefield	38	10	10	18	50	61	−11	40	
17	Fakenham Town	38	11	3	24	53	79	−26	36	
18	Ely City	38	10	6	22	44	86	−42	36	
19	Haverhill Rovers	38	8	6	24	43	96	−53	30	Relegated to Division One North
20	Whitton United	38	2	3	33	27	168	−141	9	Relegated to Division One North

Source: The FA Full-Time
Rules for classification: 1) Points; 2) Goal difference; 3) Number of goals scored; 4) Number of matches won; 5) Head-to-head results

=== Inter-step play-off ===
29 April 2023	Barton Rovers	2–0	Thetford Town	Barton-le-Clay
15:00				Stadium: Sharpenhoe Road

=== Stadia and locations ===
Locations of the Premier Division clubs

Team	Stadium	Capacity
Brantham Athletic	Brantham Leisure Centre	1,200
Ely City	Unwin Sports Ground	1,500
Fakenham Town	Clipbush Park	2,000
Hadleigh United	Millfield	3,000
Harleston Town	Wilderness Lane	
Haverhill Rovers	New Croft	3,000
Ipswich Wanderers	Humber Doucy Lane	
Kirkley & Pakefield	Walmer Road	2,000
Lakenheath	The Nest	
Long Melford	Stoneylands	
Mildenhall Town	Recreation Way	2,000
Mulbarton Wanderers	The Common	
Newmarket Town	Cricket Field Road	2,750
Norwich United	Plantation Park	3,000
Sheringham	Weybourne Road	
Soham Town Rangers	Julius Martin Lane	2,000
Thetford Town	Mundford Road	1,500
Walsham-le-Willows	Summer Road	1,000
Whitton United	King George V Playing Fields	1,000
Woodbridge Town	Notcutts Park	3,000

== Division One North ==
Eastern Counties Football League Division One North
- Season: 2022–23
- Champions: Heacham
- Promoted: Downham Town; Heacham
- Relegated: Debenham LC
- Matches: 342
- Goals: 1,267 (3.7 per match)

Division One North featured eleven clubs which competed in the previous season, along with eight new clubs.

- Transferred from Division One South:
  - AFC Sudbury reserves
  - Cornard United
  - Harwich & Parkeston
  - Haverhill Borough
  - Holland
- Plus:
  - Heacham, promoted from the Anglian Combination
  - Holbeach United, relegated from the United Counties League
  - Swaffham Town, relegated from the Premier Division

=== League table ===
Pos	Team	Pld	W	D	L	GF	GA	GD	Pts	Promotion, qualification or relegation
1	Heacham	36	27	4	5	96	34	+62	85	Promoted to the Premier Division
2	Downham Town	36	25	6	5	84	35	+49	81	Qualified for the play-offs, then promoted to the Premier Division
3	Framlingham Town	36	22	5	9	93	42	+51	71	Qualified for the play-offs
4	Harwich & Parkeston	36	21	8	7	82	52	+30	71	Qualified for the play-offs
5	Whittlesey Athletic	36	20	6	10	81	54	+27	66	Qualified for the play-offs
6	Huntingdon Town	36	16	10	10	71	54	+17	58	Transferred to the Spartan South Midlands League
7	Cornard United	36	17	5	14	83	64	+19	56	
8	AFC Sudbury reserves	36	17	3	16	86	70	+16	54	
9	Norwich CBS	36	16	4	16	76	74	+2	52	
10	Holbeach United	36	12	11	13	68	56	+12	47	
11	Holland	36	11	13	12	57	70	−13	46	
12	Diss Town	36	10	12	14	44	54	−10	42	
13	Great Yarmouth Town	36	11	5	20	52	66	−14	38	
14	Swaffham Town	36	9	10	17	40	70	−30	37	
15	Needham Market under 23s	36	10	4	22	59	99	−40	34	
16	Leiston reserves	36	9	7	20	46	92	−46	34	
17	Haverhill Borough	36	9	5	22	59	108	−49	32	
18	FC Parson Drove	36	8	5	23	45	87	−42	29	Reprieved from relegation
19	Debenham LC	36	5	11	20	45	86	−41	26	Relegated to the Suffolk and Ipswich League

Source: The FA Full-Time
Rules for classification: 1) Points; 2) Goal difference; 3) Number of goals scored; 4) Number of matches won; 5) Head-to-head results

=== Play-offs ===
Semi-finals
2	Downham Town	4
5	Whittlesey Athletic	1
3	Framlingham Town	1 (4)
4	Harwich & Parkeston	1 (5)

Final
2	Downham Town	4
4	Harwich & Parkeston	0

==== Semifinals ====
25 April 2023	Framlingham Town	1–1 (4–5 p)	Harwich & Parkeston	Framlingham
		Report		Stadium: Badingham Road; Attendance: 190

26 April 2023	Downham Town	4–1	Whittlesey Athletic	Downham Market
		Report		Stadium: Memorial Field; Attendance: 206

==== Final ====
29 April 2023	Downham Town	4–0	Harwich & Parkeston	Downham Market
		Report		Stadium: Memorial Field; Attendance: 347

=== Stadia and locations ===
Locations of Division One North clubs

Team	Stadium	Capacity
AFC Sudbury reserves	King's Marsh	2,500
Cornard United	Blackhouse Lane	
Debenham LC	Maitlands	1,000
Diss Town	Brewers Green Lane	2,500
Downham Town	Memorial Field	1,000
FC Parson Drove	Main Road	
Framlingham Town	Badingham Road	
Great Yarmouth Town	Wellesley Recreation Ground	3,600
Harwich & Parkeston	Royal Oak	
Haverhill Borough	New Croft (artificial, groundshare with Haverhill Rovers)	3,000
Heacham	Station Road	
Holbeach United	Carters Park	4,000
Holland	Dulwich Road	
Huntingdon Town	Jubilee Park	
Leiston reserves	Victory Road	2,500
Needham Market reserves	Bloomfields	4,000
Norwich CBS	FDC Bowthorpe	
Swaffham Town	Shoemakers Lane	
Whittlesey Athletic	Feldale Field	

== Division One South ==
Eastern Counties Football League Division One South
- Season: 2022–23
- Champions: Frenford
- Promoted: Frenford; Sporting Bengal United
- Relegated: Coggeshall United
- Matches: 342
- Goals: 1,248 (3.65 per match)

Division One South featured eleven clubs which competed in the division last season, along with eight new clubs:

- Basildon Town, promoted from the Essex Olympian League
- Cannons Wood, formerly DTFC, promoted from the Essex Alliance League
- Enfield Borough, transferred from the Combined Counties League
- NW London, promoted from the Middlesex County League
- Sporting Bengal United, relegated from the Essex Senior League
- St Margaretsbury, relegated from the Essex Senior League
- Stanway Pegasus, promoted from the Essex and Suffolk Border League
- Tower Hamlets, relegated from the Southern Counties East League

=== League table ===
Pos	Team	Pld	W	D	L	GF	GA	GD	Pts	Promotion, qualification or relegation
1	Frenford	36	25	6	5	82	51	+31	81	Promoted to the Essex Senior League
2	Basildon Town	36	24	8	4	90	50	+40	80	Qualified for the play-offs
3	Wormley Rovers	36	23	7	6	89	39	+50	76	Qualified for the play-offs
4	Sporting Bengal United	36	23	4	9	82	61	+21	73	Qualified for the play-offs, then promoted to the Essex Senior League
5	Stanway Pegasus	36	20	6	10	80	57	+23	66	Qualified for the play-offs, then transferred to Division One North
6	Benfleet	36	20	4	12	74	50	+24	64	
7	Burnham Ramblers	36	18	7	11	72	44	+28	61	
8	May & Baker	36	17	7	12	59	51	+8	58	
9	Cannons Wood	36	15	5	16	74	65	+9	50	
10	St Margaretsbury	36	15	4	17	61	68	−7	49	
11	Park View	36	13	5	18	58	69	−11	44	
12	Barkingside	36	10	10	16	51	58	−7	40	
13	Enfield Borough	36	11	6	19	53	68	−15	39	
14	Tower Hamlets	36	9	8	19	52	78	−26	35	
15	Wivenhoe Town	36	9	7	20	58	87	−29	34	Transferred to Division One North
16	Newbury Forest	36	9	6	21	58	90	−32	33	
17	NW London	36	8	8	20	70	91	−21	32	
18	Hackney Wick	36	7	10	19	39	67	−28	31	Reprieved from relegation
19	Coggeshall United	36	4	6	26	46	104	−58	18	Relegated, then folded

Source: The FA Full-Time
Rules for classification: 1) Points; 2) Goal difference; 3) Number of goals scored; 4) Number of matches won; 5) Head-to-head results

=== Play-offs ===
Semi-finals
2	Basildon Town	0
5	Stanway Pegasus	1
3	Wormley Rovers	0
4	Sporting Bengal United	2

Final
5	Stanway Pegasus	2 (2)
4	Sporting Bengal United	2 (4)

==== Semifinals ====
25 April 2023	Basildon Town	0–1	Stanway Pegasus	Basildon
		Report		Stadium: The Hive, Gardiners Close

26 April 2023	Wormley Rovers	0–2	Sporting Bengal United	Wormley
		Report		Stadium: Wormley Playing Fields

==== Final ====
29 April 2023	Stanway Pegasus	2–2 (a.e.t.) (2–4 p)	Sporting Bengal United	Coggeshall
		Report		Stadium: West Street; Attendance: 399

=== Stadia and locations ===
Locations of Division One South clubs
Greater London Division One South football clubs

Team	Stadium	Capacity
Barkingside	Cricklefield Stadium (groundshare with Ilford)	3,500
Basildon Town	Rookery Hill (groundshare with East Thurrock United)	3,500
Benfleet	Park Lane (groundshare with Canvey Island)	4,100
Burnham Ramblers	Leslie Fields	2,000
Cannons Wood	The Harlow Arena (groundshare with Harlow Town)	3,500
Coggeshall United	West Street (groundshare with Coggeshall Town)	
Enfield Borough	The Maurice Rebak Stadium (groundshare with Wingate & Finchley)	1,500
Frenford	The Jack Carter Centre	2,000
Hackney Wick	Spa Road (groundshare with Witham Town)	2,500
May & Baker	Parkside Stadium (groundshare with Aveley)	3,500
Newbury Forest	Oakside Stadium (groundshare with Redbridge)	3,000
NW London	Brickfield Lane (groundshare with Hadley)	2,000
Park View	New River Stadium	5,000
Sporting Bengal United	Mile End Stadium (groundshare with Tower Hamlets)	2,000
St Margaretsbury	Recreation Ground	1,000
Stanway Pegasus	The Stanway School	
Tower Hamlets	Mile End Stadium (groundshare with Sporting Bengal United)	2,000
Wivenhoe Town	Broad Lane	2,876
Wormley Rovers	Wormley Playing Fields	500
