= 2025–26 Eastern Counties Football League =

Association football competition

The 2025–26 Eastern Counties Football League is the 83rd season of the Eastern Counties Football League, a football competition in England. Teams are divided into three divisions, the Premier Division at Step 5, and the geographically separated Division One North and Division One South (Eastern Senior League), both at Step 6 of the English football league system. The constitution was announced on 15 May 2025.

== Premier Division ==
Eastern Counties Football League Premier Division
- Season: 2025–26
- Champions: Mulbarton Wanderers
- Promoted: Mulbarton Wanderers; Fakenham Town
- Relegated: Hadleigh United
- Matches: 306
- Goals: 1,034 (3.38 per match)
- Top goalscorer: Ryan Hawkins (Dereham Town/Harleston Town) (25 goals)
- Biggest home win: Fakenham Town 7–0 Cornard United (30 August 2025); Ely City 8–1 Cornard United (17 January 2026); Haverhill Rovers 8–1 Stowmarket Town (3 February 2026)
- Biggest away win: Woodbridge Town 0–5 Mulbarton Wanderers (9 August 2025); Ely City 0–5 Mulbarton Wanderers (8 November 2025)
- Highest scoring: Haverhill Rovers 8–3 Woodbridge Town (14 February 2026)
- All statistics correct as of 10 April 2026.

The Premier Division featured 16 teams from the previous season.

Two clubs joined the division:

- Haverhill Rovers, promoted from Division One North
- Ipswich Wanderers, relegated from the Isthmian League

Four clubs left the division:

- Brantham Athletic, promoted to the Isthmian League.
- Downham Town, promoted to the Isthmian League.
- Long Melford, relegated to Division One North.
- Sheringham, resigned from the league.

=== Premier Division table ===
| Pos | Team | Pld | W | D | L | GF | GA | GD | Pts | Promotion, qualification or relegation |
|---|---|---|---|---|---|---|---|---|---|---|
| 1 | Mulbarton Wanderers (C, P) | 34 | 28 | 3 | 3 | 98 | 23 | +75 | 87 | Promotion to the Isthmian League North Division |
| 2 | Haverhill Rovers | 34 | 20 | 6 | 8 | 78 | 49 | +29 | 66 | Qualification for the play-offs |
| 3 | Ely City | 34 | 20 | 5 | 9 | 77 | 39 | +38 | 65 | Qualification for the play-offs |
| 4 | Soham Town Rangers | 34 | 21 | 2 | 11 | 71 | 41 | +30 | 65 | Qualification for the play-offs |
| 5 | Fakenham Town (O, P) | 34 | 19 | 6 | 9 | 66 | 40 | +26 | 63 | Qualification for the play-offs |
| 6 | Thetford Town | 34 | 17 | 8 | 9 | 61 | 40 | +21 | 59 | |
| 7 | Ipswich Wanderers | 34 | 18 | 5 | 11 | 58 | 37 | +21 | 59 | |
| 8 | Great Yarmouth Town | 34 | 17 | 4 | 13 | 55 | 45 | +10 | 55 | |
| 9 | Harleston Town | 34 | 13 | 7 | 14 | 45 | 53 | −8 | 46 | |
| 10 | Dereham Town | 34 | 12 | 9 | 13 | 51 | 46 | +5 | 45 | |
| 11 | Woodbridge Town | 34 | 13 | 2 | 19 | 55 | 82 | −27 | 41 | |
| 12 | Walsham-le-Willows | 34 | 10 | 8 | 16 | 57 | 63 | −6 | 38 | |
| 13 | Stowmarket Town | 34 | 10 | 7 | 17 | 56 | 83 | −27 | 37 | |
| 14 | Kirkley & Pakefield | 34 | 11 | 3 | 20 | 50 | 64 | −14 | 36 | |
| 15 | Heacham | 34 | 8 | 6 | 20 | 42 | 85 | −43 | 30 | |
| 16 | Cornard United | 34 | 8 | 5 | 21 | 41 | 83 | −42 | 29 | |
| 17 | Lakenheath | 34 | 7 | 6 | 21 | 38 | 76 | −38 | 27 | Reprieved from relegation |
| 18 | Hadleigh United (R) | 34 | 5 | 6 | 23 | 35 | 85 | −50 | 21 | Relegation to Division One North |

Source: The FA Full-Time
Rules for classification: 1) Points; 2) Goal difference; 3) Number of goals scored; 4) Number of matches won; 5) Head-to-head results
(C) Champions; (O) Play-off winners; (P) Promoted; (R) Relegated

=== Play-offs ===
Semi-finals
2 | Haverhill Rovers | 0
5 | Fakenham Town | 2
3 | Ely City | 1
4 | Soham Town Rangers | 3

Final
4 | Soham Town Rangers | 1 (6)
5 | Fakenham Town | 1 (7)

==== Semifinals ====
| 25 April 2026 | Haverhill Rovers | 0–2 | Fakenham Town | Haverhill |
| 15:00 | | Report | Malenguka 65', 80' | Stadium: The New Croft; Attendance: 504; Referee: Adam Everett |

| 25 April 2026 | Ely City | 1–3 | Soham Town Rangers | Ely |
| 15:00 | Townshend 48' | Report | Cowie 23'; Jackaman 54'; Flatts 90+5' | Stadium: The Unwin Ground; Attendance: 712; Referee: Adrian Copsey |

==== Final ====
| 2 May 2026 | Soham Town Rangers | 1–1 (a.e.t.) (6–7 p) | Fakenham Town | Soham |
| 15:00 | Ward 41' | Report | Rasberry 56' | Stadium: Just George Stadium; Attendance: 814; Referee: Jordan Sandwell |
| | Penalties |
| | Jackaman (penalty scored); Newman (penalty scored); Flatts (penalty scored); Connor (penalty scored); Lambert (penalty scored); Stephenson (penalty scored) | | Watts (penalty scored); Baird (penalty scored); Valter (penalty scored); Henman (penalty scored); Reynolds (penalty scored); Pearson (penalty scored); Mayhew (penalty scored) |

=== Results table ===
| Home \ Away | COR | DER | ELY | FAK | GYT | HAD | HAR | HVR | HEA | IPS | K&P | LAK | MUL | STR | STW | THE | WLW | WOO |
|---|---|---|---|---|---|---|---|---|---|---|---|---|---|---|---|---|---|---|
| Cornard United | — | 1–1 | 0–4 | 0–3 | 0–3 | 0–1 | 2–0 | 1–2 | 2–0 | 2–0 | 2–2 | 3–1 | 0–3 | 3–2 | 2–2 | 1–0 | 6–2 | 1–2 |
| Dereham Town | 4–0 | — | 2–1 | 0–1 | 3–0 | 1–1 | 3–4 | 0–2 | 1–1 | 0–1 | 2–1 | 1–0 | 0–2 | 2–1 | 2–2 | 5–1 | 0–2 | 2–1 |
| Ely City | 8–1 | 2–0 | — | 2–0 | 1–2 | 4–0 | 2–0 | 0–2 | 6–0 | 0–2 | 2–1 | 5–1 | 0–5 | 1–0 | 4–2 | 2–1 | 1–1 | 1–3 |
| Fakenham Town | 7–0 | 2–2 | 1–0 | — | 1–2 | 5–1 | 2–2 | 3–1 | 2–3 | 0–3 | 1–0 | 1–1 | 1–0 | 1–1 | 7–2 | 1–2 | 2–1 | 4–0 |
| Great Yarmouth Town | 2–2 | 0–3 | 1–1 | 2–0 | — | 4–0 | 1–0 | 2–0 | 4–0 | 0–3 | 3–2 | 0–0 | 0–1 | 1–0 | 0–2 | 1–0 | 3–2 | 3–3 |
| Hadleigh United | 0–1 | 0–2 | 1–2 | 1–5 | 1–5 | — | 1–3 | 4–4 | 0–0 | 4–2 | 0–2 | 2–2 | 2–2 | 0–2 | 1–4 | 0–1 | 2–0 | 3–6 |
| Harleston Town | 1–0 | 1–1 | 0–3 | 0–1 | 2–0 | 2–1 | — | 0–3 | 3–2 | 1–0 | 1–1 | 0–0 | 1–5 | 1–1 | 3–1 | 3–4 | 1–1 | 4–3 |
| Haverhill Rovers | 1–0 | 2–1 | 1–2 | 0–3 | 1–0 | 2–2 | 1–3 | — | 4–0 | 3–1 | 2–1 | 1–0 | 1–3 | 2–4 | 8–1 | 2–2 | 1–0 | 8–3 |
| Heacham | 1–1 | 1–1 | 2–3 | 0–3 | 2–1 | 2–0 | 0–2 | 0–3 | — | 3–2 | 3–4 | 1–1 | 1–5 | 1–2 | 1–4 | 2–6 | 5–3 | 1–3 |
| Ipswich Wanderers | 3–2 | 1–2 | 1–1 | 4–0 | 2–0 | 1–2 | 1–0 | 1–1 | 0–0 | — | 3–0 | 6–0 | 0–3 | 1–2 | 1–0 | 2–0 | 3–1 | 3–0 |
| Kirkley & Pakefield | 4–3 | 3–2 | 2–1 | 0–1 | 1–2 | 2–0 | 0–1 | 1–4 | 4–0 | 0–1 | — | 0–1 | 1–3 | 3–4 | 3–3 | 0–2 | 0–2 | 2–0 |
| Lakenheath | 2–1 | 4–2 | 0–3 | 0–1 | 3–2 | 2–3 | 2–1 | 0–3 | 2–3 | 2–2 | 1–2 | — | 0–4 | 1–2 | 2–3 | 0–4 | 2–1 | 1–2 |
| Mulbarton Wanderers | 4–0 | 1–0 | 2–2 | 3–0 | 2–1 | 6–0 | 2–1 | 2–2 | 2–1 | 0–2 | 1–2 | 3–0 | — | 3–2 | 3–0 | 3–0 | 3–2 | 5–0 |
| Soham Town Rangers | 4–0 | 1–4 | 1–0 | 3–0 | 2–1 | 1–0 | 4–0 | 1–2 | 4–0 | 2–1 | 4–2 | 2–3 | 0–1 | — | 6–1 | 1–3 | 4–2 | 3–0 |
| Stowmarket Town | 4–3 | 1–1 | 2–2 | 2–3 | 1–3 | 3–1 | 0–1 | 2–5 | 1–0 | 1–2 | 1–2 | 2–1 | 0–4 | 0–1 | — | 1–2 | 0–0 | 3–1 |
| Thetford Town | 5–1 | 0–0 | 1–2 | 1–1 | 1–2 | 3–1 | 1–0 | 1–1 | 4–0 | 0–0 | 2–0 | 4–1 | 0–2 | 1–0 | 2–2 | — | 2–2 | 2–1 |
| Walsham-le-Willows | 3–0 | 3–1 | 1–5 | 1–1 | 0–2 | 2–0 | 0–0 | 4–1 | 2–3 | 5–1 | 3–1 | 3–0 | 1–5 | 0–3 | 4–0 | 0–0 | — | 2–4 |
| Woodbridge Town | 2–0 | 2–0 | 0–4 | 0–2 | 3–2 | 2–0 | 4–3 | 1–2 | 0–3 | 0–2 | 3–1 | 3–2 | 0–5 | 0–1 | 2–3 | 0–3 | 1–1 | — |

Source: The FA Full-Time
Legend: Blue = home team win; Yellow = draw; Red = away team win.
For upcoming matches, an "a" indicates there is an article about the rivalry between the two participants.

=== Stadia and locations ===
Locations of the Premier Division clubs

| Team | Location | Stadium | Capacity |
|---|---|---|---|
| Cornard United | Sudbury (Little Cornard) | Blackhouse Lane | |
| Dereham Town | Dereham | Aldiss Park | 3,000 |
| Ely City | Ely | Unwin Sports Ground | 1,500 |
| Fakenham Town | Fakenham | Clipbush Park | 2,000 |
| Great Yarmouth Town | Great Yarmouth | Wellesley Recreation Ground | 3,600 |
| Hadleigh United | Hadleigh | Millfield | 3,000 |
| Harleston Town | Harleston | Wilderness Lane | |
| Haverhill Rovers | Haverhill | New Croft | 3,000 |
| Heacham | Heacham | Station Road | |
| Ipswich Wanderers | Ipswich | Humber Doucy Lane | 550 |
| Kirkley & Pakefield | Lowestoft | Walmer Road | 2,000 |
| Lakenheath | Lakenheath | The Nest | |
| Mulbarton Wanderers | Mulbarton | Mulberry Park | |
| Soham Town Rangers | Soham | Julius Martin Lane | 2,000 |
| Stowmarket Town | Stowmarket | Greens Meadow | 1,000 |
| Thetford Town | Thetford | Mundford Road | 1,500 |
| Walsham-le-Willows | Walsham le Willows | Summer Road | 1,000 |
| Woodbridge Town | Martlesham | Notcutts Park | 3,000 |

=== Statistics ===
| Team | Average | Highest | Lowest |
|---|---|---|---|
| Soham Town Rangers | 269 | 1,015 vs Ely City | 138 vs Walsham-le-Willows |
| Thetford Town | 261 | 410 vs Lakenheath | 155 vs Cornard United |
| Great Yarmouth Town | 242 | 422 vs Stowmarket Town | 156 vs Cornard United |
| Ely City | 199 | 543 vs Soham Town Rangers | 91 vs Dereham Town |
| Stowmarket Town | 193 | 252 vs Kirkley & Pakefield | 106 vs Soham Town Rangers |
| Haverhill Rovers | 190 | 417 vs Fakenham Town | 62 vs Stowmarket Town |
| Dereham Town | 174 | 349 vs Mulbarton Wanderers | 110 vs Cornard United |
| Ipswich Wanderers | 172 | 335 vs Woodbridge Town | 77 vs Harleston Town |
| Fakenham Town | 154 | 235 vs Heacham | 120 vs Soham Town Rangers & Woodbridge Town |
| Woodbridge Town | 153 | 365 vs Ipswich Wanderers | 90 vs Hadleigh United |
| Mulbarton Wanderers | 152 | 296 vs Ely City | 82 vs Lakenheath |
| Hadleigh United | 127 | 243 vs Stowmarket Town | 65 vs Kirkley & Pakefield |
| Heacham | 123 | 212 vs Fakenham Town | 75 vs Ipswich Wanderers |
| Harleston Town | 114 | 220 vs Kirkley & Pakefield | 57 vs Haverhill Rovers |
| Walsham-le-Willows | 98 | 165 vs Haverhill Rovers | 54 vs Fakenham Town |
| Lakenheath | 94 | 146 vs Ely City | 52 vs Kirkley & Pakefield |
| Kirkley & Pakefield | 83 | 214 vs Great Yarmouth Town | 36 vs Lakenheath |
| Cornard United | 56 | 74 vs Great Yarmouth Town & Hadleigh United | 37 vs Mulbarton Wanderers |

== Division One North ==
Eastern Counties Football League Division One North
- Season: 2025–26
- Champions: Kings Park Rangers
- Promoted: Kings Park Rangers
- Matches: 380
- Goals: 1,385 (3.64 per match)
- Biggest home win: Dussindale & Hellesdon Rovers 7–1 Holbeach United (16 August 2025); Holland 6–0 Haverhill Borough (15 November 2025); Framlingham Town 6–0 Wroxham reserves (20 December 2025); Holland 6–0 AFC Sudbury reserves (7 February 2026)
- Biggest away win: Leiston under 23s 0–6 Framlingham Town (12 August 2025); AFC Sudbury reserves 0–6 Wroxham reserves (31 January 2026)
- Highest scoring: Holbeach United 4–6 Diss Town (17 January 2026); Leiston under 23s 6–4 FC Parson Drove (28 February 2026)
- All statistics correct as of 9 March 2026.

Division One North featured 15 clubs which competed in the previous season.

Five clubs joined the division:

- FC Clacton, relegated from the Essex Senior Football League
- Halesworth Town, promoted from the Suffolk & Ipswich Football League
- Kings Park Rangers, promoted from the Essex & Suffolk Border Football League
- Long Melford, relegated from the Premier Division
- Wroxham reserves, promoted from the Anglian Combination

Five clubs left the division:

- Haverhill Rovers, promoted to the Premier Division.
- Harwich & Parkeston, promoted to the Essex Senior Football League.
- Pinchbeck United, transferred to the United Counties League.
- Whitton United, resigned from the league.
- Swaffham Town, relegated to the Anglian Combination.

=== League table ===
| Pos | Team | Pld | W | D | L | GF | GA | GD | Pts | Promotion, qualification or relegation |
|---|---|---|---|---|---|---|---|---|---|---|
| 1 | Kings Park Rangers (C) | 38 | 30 | 5 | 3 | 88 | 30 | +58 | 95 | Club folded |
| 2 | Holland | 38 | 28 | 6 | 4 | 115 | 44 | +71 | 90 | Qualification for the play-offs |
| 3 | Framlingham Town | 38 | 23 | 7 | 8 | 89 | 45 | +44 | 76 | Qualification for the play-offs |
| 4 | FC Peterborough (O, P) | 38 | 23 | 6 | 9 | 91 | 51 | +40 | 75 | Qualification for the play-offs |
| 5 | Wroxham reserves | 38 | 21 | 8 | 9 | 77 | 46 | +31 | 71 | |
| 6 | Stanway Pegasus | 38 | 21 | 6 | 11 | 84 | 52 | +32 | 69 | Qualification for the play-offs |
| 7 | Haverhill Borough (R) | 38 | 18 | 7 | 13 | 69 | 56 | +13 | 61 | Resigned from the league |
| 8 | Halesworth Town | 38 | 16 | 10 | 12 | 64 | 55 | +9 | 58 | |
| 9 | Whittlesey Athletic | 38 | 17 | 5 | 16 | 71 | 65 | +6 | 56 | |
| 10 | Long Melford | 38 | 14 | 8 | 16 | 62 | 76 | −14 | 50 | |
| 11 | FC Clacton | 38 | 14 | 4 | 20 | 68 | 77 | −9 | 46 | |
| 12 | Gorleston reserves | 38 | 13 | 6 | 19 | 68 | 76 | −8 | 45 | |
| 13 | AFC Sudbury reserves | 38 | 14 | 3 | 21 | 64 | 100 | −36 | 45 | |
| 14 | Dussindale & Hellesdon Rovers | 38 | 13 | 3 | 22 | 55 | 74 | −19 | 42 | |
| 15 | FC Parson Drove | 38 | 12 | 6 | 20 | 61 | 87 | −26 | 42 | |
| 16 | Holbeach United | 38 | 11 | 8 | 19 | 53 | 90 | −37 | 41 | |
| 17 | Diss Town | 38 | 11 | 7 | 20 | 54 | 81 | −27 | 40 | |
| 18 | Needham Market reserves | 38 | 9 | 3 | 26 | 61 | 87 | −26 | 30 | Reprieved from relegation |
| 19 | Wivenhoe Town | 38 | 8 | 3 | 27 | 41 | 91 | −50 | 27 | Reprieved from relegation |
| 20 | Leiston under 23s (R) | 38 | 6 | 5 | 27 | 50 | 102 | −52 | 23 | Relegation to the Suffolk & Ipswich League Premier Division |

Source: The FA Full-Time
Rules for classification: 1) Points; 2) Goal difference; 3) Number of goals scored; 4) Number of matches won; 5) Head-to-head results
(C) Champions; (O) Play-off winners; (P) Promoted; (R) Relegated

=== Play-offs ===
Semi-finals
2 | Holland | 0
5 | Stanway Pegasus | 2
3 | Framlingham Town | 1
4 | FC Peterborough | 5

Final
4 | FC Peterborough | 3
6 | Stanway Pegasus | 0

==== Semifinals ====
| 25 April 2026 | Holland | 0–2 | Stanway Pegasus | Holland-on-Sea |
| 15:00 GMT | | Report | Griffith 10', 44' | Stadium: Dulwich Road; Referee: Sam Jones |

| 25 April 2026 | Framlingham Town | 1–5 | FC Peterborough | Framlingham |
| 15:00 GMT | Lucraft (pen.) | Report | Musa 16'; Dadzie 27'; Halfhide 68'; Gaye 78'; Bedwell 90' | Stadium: Badingham Road; Attendance: 303; Referee: Andrew Denikiewicz |

==== Final ====
| 2 May 2026 | FC Peterborough | 3–0 | Stanway Pegasus | Peterborough |
| 15:00 | Dadzie; Yisah; Vaz; (red card) 55' | Report | | Stadium: The Focus Centre; Attendance: 725; Referee: Francesca Catchpole |

=== Results table ===
| Home \ Away | SUD | DIS | DHR | CLA | FPD | PET | FRA | GOR | HAL | HVB | HLB | HLD | KPR | LEI | LNM | NHM | STP | WHI | WIV | WRO |
|---|---|---|---|---|---|---|---|---|---|---|---|---|---|---|---|---|---|---|---|---|
| AFC Sudbury reserves | — | 3–0 | 3–2 | 3–2 | 3–5 | 0–7 | 2–2 | 1–2 | 3–2 | 1–5 | 2–1 | 1–5 | 0–2 | 4–1 | 2–1 | 3–1 | 1–3 | 4–0 | 0–3 | 0–6 |
| Diss Town | 0–3 | — | 2–0 | 2–1 | 3–0 | 1–3 | 0–1 | 0–3 | 1–1 | 2–1 | 2–2 | 0–4 | 0–1 | 2–2 | 2–3 | 3–1 | 2–1 | 3–2 | 1–2 | 1–4 |
| Dussindale & Hellesdon Rovers | 1–2 | 1–1 | — | 0–1 | 1–3 | 0–4 | 1–2 | 3–1 | 0–1 | 2–1 | 7–1 | 1–1 | 1–4 | 1–0 | 5–1 | 1–5 | 2–1 | 2–4 | 6–2 | 1–0 |
| FC Clacton | 2–1 | 2–3 | 2–1 | — | 4–3 | 1–3 | 1–1 | 2–1 | 4–2 | 0–3 | 1–2 | 1–5 | 3–1 | 6–1 | 5–1 | 2–0 | 0–2 | 1–0 | 6–1 | 1–3 |
| FC Parson Drove | 1–1 | 3–2 | 0–2 | 1–0 | — | 2–4 | 0–1 | 3–3 | 1–1 | 0–2 | 2–0 | 0–1 | 1–4 | 2–1 | 3–3 | 3–1 | 0–2 | 1–0 | 2–0 | 0–4 |
| FC Peterborough | 4–2 | 3–3 | 1–2 | 2–1 | 6–2 | — | 0–1 | 1–0 | 3–0 | 0–3 | 2–1 | 2–3 | 0–1 | 3–1 | 3–0 | 3–1 | 1–0 | 2–0 | 3–2 | 1–1 |
| Framlingham Town | 4–0 | 3–1 | 1–2 | 2–1 | 6–1 | 3–4 | — | 1–1 | 1–1 | 2–0 | 3–0 | 2–3 | 0–3 | 5–1 | 1–0 | 2–1 | 2–0 | 2–1 | 4–1 | 6–0 |
| Gorleston reserves | 3–1 | 4–0 | 4–0 | 5–1 | 1–2 | 2–2 | 2–1 | — | 3–1 | 1–2 | 3–3 | 1–3 | 1–2 | 2–1 | 3–2 | 0–3 | 0–4 | 1–1 | 2–0 | 1–2 |
| Halesworth Town | 0–2 | 2–2 | 4–1 | 2–0 | 1–2 | 1–2 | 2–3 | 2–0 | — | 3–3 | 1–1 | 2–0 | 2–2 | 2–0 | 1–2 | 2–1 | 3–1 | 3–2 | 1–0 | 0–3 |
| Haverhill Borough | 5–0 | 3–3 | 3–1 | 1–0 | 2–1 | 3–3 | 0–1 | 2–2 | 2–2 | — | 0–3 | 0–2 | 1–1 | 3–0 | 6–2 | 2–1 | 0–1 | 1–3 | 1–0 | 0–0 |
| Holbeach United | 2–1 | 4–6 | 2–1 | 2–2 | 1–0 | 0–5 | 0–6 | 3–1 | 1–3 | 1–2 | — | 0–5 | 0–0 | 3–2 | 2–2 | 3–2 | 1–2 | 1–1 | 2–1 | 0–2 |
| Holland | 6–0 | 2–0 | 5–0 | 3–1 | 4–1 | 1–1 | 3–3 | 4–2 | 3–2 | 6–0 | 2–1 | — | 1–2 | 6–0 | 1–1 | 5–1 | 1–1 | 4–3 | 3–1 | 4–2 |
| Kings Park Rangers | 4–1 | 4–0 | 2–0 | 2–0 | 0–0 | 2–0 | 3–2 | 3–1 | 1–0 | 1–0 | 5–1 | 3–0 | — | 5–1 | 2–4 | 2–1 | 2–0 | 1–2 | 2–0 | 1–1 |
| Leiston under 23s | 2–1 | 2–4 | 3–1 | 2–2 | 6–4 | 1–2 | 0–6 | 1–2 | 0–4 | 2–3 | 1–2 | 0–4 | 0–2 | — | 4–0 | 2–2 | 3–4 | 0–3 | 4–1 | 0–1 |
| Long Melford | 5–1 | 2–1 | 0–1 | 3–0 | 2–2 | 1–0 | 1–1 | 2–1 | 1–2 | 0–2 | 3–2 | 1–1 | 0–3 | 2–0 | — | 3–1 | 1–4 | 0–1 | 4–1 | 2–0 |
| Needham Market reserves | 1–3 | 0–1 | 2–1 | 0–2 | 2–4 | 2–2 | 1–2 | 3–2 | 1–2 | 2–3 | 2–2 | 3–5 | 3–4 | 0–2 | 3–0 | — | 5–2 | 0–2 | 2–1 | 0–3 |
| Stanway Pegasus | 3–4 | 2–0 | 0–0 | 3–3 | 3–2 | 2–1 | 2–3 | 5–1 | 3–3 | 4–0 | 2–0 | 2–0 | 1–2 | 3–0 | 3–0 | 4–1 | — | 3–1 | 5–0 | 2–2 |
| Whittlesey Athletic | 1–1 | 3–0 | 2–1 | 5–4 | 3–1 | 1–2 | 3–1 | 4–2 | 0–2 | 0–3 | 5–0 | 1–5 | 1–6 | 2–1 | 1–2 | 3–2 | 2–2 | — | 3–0 | 0–0 |
| Wivenhoe Town | 4–3 | 1–0 | 0–2 | 1–3 | 3–2 | 2–5 | 0–0 | 1–2 | 1–2 | 2–1 | 1–3 | 1–2 | 0–1 | 1–1 | 3–3 | 1–3 | 1–2 | 1–0 | — | 0–5 |
| Wroxham reserves | 2–1 | 2–0 | 3–1 | 4–0 | 4–1 | 2–1 | 3–2 | 4–2 | 1–1 | 3–2 | 2–0 | 1–2 | 1–2 | 2–2 | 2–2 | 0–1 | 2–0 | 0–5 | 0–1 | — |

Source: The FA Full-Time
Legend: Blue = home team win; Yellow = draw; Red = away team win.
For upcoming matches, an "a" indicates there is an article about the rivalry between the two participants.

=== Stadia and locations ===
Locations of Division One North clubs

| Team | Location | Stadium | Capacity |
|---|---|---|---|
| AFC Sudbury reserves | Sudbury | King's Marsh | 2,500 |
| Diss Town | Diss | Brewers Green Lane | 2,500 |
| Dussindale & Hellesdon Rovers | Horsford | The Nest | 1,000 |
| FC Clacton | Clacton-on-Sea | Rush Green Bowl | 3,000 |
| FC Parson Drove | Parson Drove | Main Road | |
| FC Peterborough | Peterborough | The Focus Centre | |
| Framlingham Town | Framlingham | Badingham Road | |
| Gorleston reserves | Gorleston-on-Sea | The Nest (groundshare with Dussindale & Hellesdon Rovers) | 1,000 |
| Halesworth Town | Halesworth | Dairy Hill | |
| Haverhill Borough | Haverhill | New Croft (groundshare with Haverhill Rovers) | 3,000 |
| Holbeach United | Holbeach | Carters Park | 4,000 |
| Holland | Clacton-on-Sea (Holland-on-Sea) | Dulwich Road | |
| Kings Park Rangers | Sudbury (Little Cornard) | Blackhouse Lane (groundshare with Cornard United) | |
| Leiston under 23s | Leiston | Victory Road | 2,500 |
| Long Melford | Long Melford | Stoneylands | |
| Needham Market reserves | Needham Market | Bloomfields | 4,000 |
| Stanway Pegasus | Stanway | West Street (groundshare with Coggeshall Town) | 2,000 |
| Whittlesey Athletic | Whittlesey | Feldale Field | |
| Wivenhoe Town | Wivenhoe | Broad Lane | 2,876 |
| Wroxham reserves | Wroxham | Trafford Park | 2,500 |

=== Statistics ===
| Team | Average | Highest | Lowest |
|---|---|---|---|
| Halesworth Town | 154 | 264 vs Framlingham Town | 103 vs Kings Park Rangers |
| Diss Town | 131 | 206 vs Haverhill Borough | 94 vs FC Peterborough |
| Framlingham Town | 102 | 253 vs Halesworth Town | 65 vs Whittlesey Athletic |
| Wivenhoe Town | 99 | 172 vs Holland | 46 vs FC Peterborough |
| Stanway Pegasus | 97 | 205 vs Wivenhoe Town | 68 vs Long Melford & Holbeach United |
| FC Peterborough | 97 | 178 vs Whittlesey Athletic | 47 vs Dussindale & Hellesdon Rovers |
| FC Clacton | 90 | 153 vs Stanway Pegasus | 44 vs Long Melford |
| Kings Park Rangers | 75 | 187 vs Dussindale & Hellesdon Rovers | 26 vs Whittlesey Athletic |
| Wroxham reserves | 71 | 105 vs Diss Town | 50 vs Wivenhoe Town |
| AFC Sudbury reserves | 62 | 117 vs Stanway Pegasus | 32 vs FC Peterborough |
| Long Melford | 61 | 104 vs Wivenhoe Town | 33 vs Dussindale & Hellesdon Rovers |
| Leiston under 23s | 52 | 85 vs Framlingham Town | 32 vs Wroxham reserves |
| FC Parson Drove | 52 | 110 vs Holbeach United | 25 vs Needham Market reserves |
| Dussindale & Hellesdon Rovers | 51 | 138 vs FC Peterborough | 24 vs Needham Market reserves |
| Needham Market reserves | 50 | 83 vs Framlingham Town | 21 vs FC Clacton |
| Haverhill Borough | 37 | 82 vs Long Melford | 17 vs Holbeach United |
| Gorleston reserves | 34 | 86 vs Wroxham reserves | 15 vs Long Melford |
| Holbeach United* | N/A | | |
| Holland* | N/A | | |
| Whittlesey Athletic* | N/A | | |

*Holbeach United, Holland and Whittlesey Athletic attendances are limited on FA Full Time therefore an average cannot be found.

== Division One South ==
Eastern Counties Football League Division One South
- Season: 2025–26
- Champions: Hutton
- Promoted: Hutton
- Matches: 419
- Goals: 1,640 (3.91 per match)
- Biggest home win: Stansted 11–0 NW London (22 November 2025)
- Biggest away win: AS London 0–7 Rayleigh Town (1 November 2025)
- Highest scoring: Stansted 11–0 NW London (22 November 2025)
- Highest attendance: 2,375 Clapton Community 4–2 Rayleigh Town 2 May 2026
- All statistics correct as of 9 March 2026.

Division One South featured 17 clubs which competed in the division last season.

Four clubs joined the division:

- Clapton Community, transferred from the Southern Counties East Football League Division One
- FC Romania, relegated from the Spartan South Midlands Football League Premier Division
- Lymore Gardens, promoted from the Essex Alliance Football League
- Stansted, relegated from the Essex Senior Football League

Three clubs left the division:

- Hackney Wick, promoted to the Essex Senior Football League.
- Harlow Town, promoted to the Spartan South Midlands League Premier Division.
- St Margaretsbury, relegated to the Hertfordshire Senior County League.

=== League table ===
| Pos | Team | Pld | W | D | L | GF | GA | GD | Pts | Promotion, qualification or relegation |
|---|---|---|---|---|---|---|---|---|---|---|
| 1 | Hutton (C, P) | 40 | 28 | 9 | 3 | 107 | 45 | +62 | 93 | Promotion to the Essex Senior League |
| 2 | Clapton Community (O, P) | 40 | 28 | 6 | 6 | 100 | 45 | +55 | 90 | Qualification for the play-offs |
| 3 | Coggeshall Town | 40 | 25 | 10 | 5 | 92 | 43 | +49 | 85 | Qualification for the play-offs |
| 4 | Rayleigh Town | 40 | 22 | 7 | 11 | 105 | 50 | +55 | 73 | Qualification for the play-offs |
| 5 | Lymore Gardens | 40 | 22 | 5 | 13 | 79 | 63 | +16 | 71 | Qualification for the play-offs |
| 6 | Newbury Forest | 40 | 20 | 10 | 10 | 106 | 64 | +42 | 70 | |
| 7 | Brimsdown | 40 | 19 | 12 | 9 | 90 | 63 | +27 | 69 | |
| 8 | Stansted | 40 | 16 | 15 | 9 | 79 | 51 | +28 | 63 | |
| 9 | Hoddesdon Town | 40 | 18 | 7 | 15 | 58 | 67 | −9 | 61 | |
| 10 | Basildon Town | 40 | 17 | 9 | 14 | 88 | 75 | +13 | 60 | |
| 11 | Burnham Ramblers | 40 | 17 | 8 | 15 | 86 | 76 | +10 | 59 | |
| 12 | Cannons Wood | 40 | 15 | 5 | 20 | 86 | 92 | −6 | 50 | |
| 13 | AS London | 40 | 12 | 8 | 20 | 58 | 81 | −23 | 44 | |
| 14 | FC Baresi | 40 | 11 | 7 | 22 | 69 | 96 | −27 | 40 | |
| 15 | Enfield Borough | 40 | 12 | 4 | 24 | 67 | 99 | −32 | 40 | |
| 16 | Dunmow Town | 40 | 9 | 10 | 21 | 75 | 104 | −29 | 37 | |
| 17 | Southend Manor | 40 | 11 | 4 | 25 | 56 | 117 | −61 | 37 | |
| 18 | May & Baker | 40 | 9 | 9 | 22 | 66 | 104 | −38 | 36 | |
| 19 | NW London | 40 | 10 | 6 | 24 | 73 | 121 | −48 | 36 | Reprieved from relegation |
| 20 | FC Romania | 40 | 9 | 7 | 24 | 68 | 99 | −31 | 34 | Club folded |
| 21 | Barkingside (R) | 40 | 8 | 6 | 26 | 37 | 90 | −53 | 30 | Relegation to the Essex Alliance League Senior Division |

Source: The FA Full-Time
Rules for classification: 1) Points; 2) Goal difference; 3) Number of goals scored; 4) Number of matches won; 5) Head-to-head results
(C) Champions; (O) Play-off winners; (P) Promoted; (R) Relegated

=== Play-offs ===
Semi-finals
2 | Clapton Community | 4
5 | Lymore Gardens | 1
3 | Coggeshall Town | 2
4 | Rayleigh Town | 3

Final
2 | Clapton Community | 4
4 | Rayleigh Town | 2

==== Semifinals ====
| 25 April 2026 | Clapton Community | 4–1 | Lymore Gardens | Forest Gate |
| 15:00 GMT | Cook 20', 59'; Briggs 39' (pen.); Sidky 45' | Report | Benfield 78' | Stadium: The Old Spotted Dog Ground; Attendance: 1,377; Referee: Steve Tovey |

| 25 April 2026 | Coggeshall Town | 2–3 | Rayleigh Town | Coggeshall |
| 15:00 GMT | Hayes 35'; Borein 43' | Report | Sasere 14'; Tunde-Ojolowo 45'; Fiadzomor 75' | Stadium: West Street; Referee: Robert Maris |

==== Final ====
| 2 May 2026 | Clapton Community | 4–2 (a.e.t.) | Rayleigh Town | Forest Gate |
| 15:00 | Taylor 8', 108'; Austin 11'; Gordon 103' | Report | Jones 19' (pen.), 68' | Stadium: The Old Spotted Dog Ground; Attendance: 2,375; Referee: Cameron Saunders |

=== Results table ===
| Home \ Away | ASL | BRK | BAS | BRM | BUR | CNW | CLA | COG | DUN | EFB | BSI | ROM | HOD | HUT | LYG | M&B | NBF | NWL | RAY | SEM | STA |
|---|---|---|---|---|---|---|---|---|---|---|---|---|---|---|---|---|---|---|---|---|---|
| AS London | — | 0–0 | 6–3 | 1–3 | 2–1 | 3–1 | 0–3 | 1–4 | 3–4 | 0–2 | 0–3 | 1–2 | 4–0 | 1–1 | 2–1 | 0–4 | 1–1 | 0–2 | 0–7 | 7–0 | 1–1 |
| Barkingside | 1–0 | — | 1–6 | 1–2 | 2–3 | 2–2 | 0–4 | 1–4 | 0–0 | 1–0 | 1–3 | 1–3 | 0–2 | 0–5 | 0–4 | 0–2 | 0–1 | 1–3 | 1–2 | 1–0 | 0–2 |
| Basildon Town | 3–2 | 2–0 | — | 1–2 | 0–2 | 0–3 | 0–1 | 1–4 | 4–4 | 5–2 | 1–1 | 2–1 | 3–0 | 3–0 | 1–2 | 0–0 | 3–3 | 3–1 | 1–1 | 7–1 | 1–1 |
| Brimsdown | 5–1 | 3–0 | 3–1 | — | 1–1 | 2–5 | 2–3 | 1–1 | 0–0 | 4–0 | 2–1 | 2–0 | 1–2 | 0–1 | 3–2 | 5–0 | 1–0 | 2–1 | 0–0 | 5–2 | 1–1 |
| Burnham Ramblers | 0–2 | 2–4 | 4–1 | 2–2 | — | 3–4 | 1–1 | 1–1 | 1–3 | 2–1 | 0–2 | 3–1 | 1–2 | 1–3 | 0–1 | 3–1 | 1–1 | 3–0 | 1–6 | 2–2 | 2–1 |
| Cannons Wood | 1–2 | 0–0 | 0–1 | 2–1 | 1–3 | — | 4–1 | 2–3 | 0–4 | 2–5 | 5–3 | 4–1 | 4–0 | 0–6 | 3–1 | 5–2 | 3–1 | 4–0 | 1–2 | 2–3 | 0–2 |
| Clapton Community | 1–2 | 5–0 | 1–2 | 1–1 | 2–3 | 2–0 | — | 2–1 | 5–0 | 3–2 | 2–2 | 4–2 | 4–1 | 2–2 | 3–0 | 1–0 | 2–2 | 3–2 | 4–2 | 2–1 | 1–0 |
| Coggeshall Town | 1–0 | 4–0 | 2–2 | 1–1 | 2–1 | 3–1 | 1–2 | — | 2–2 | 2–0 | 4–1 | 2–0 | 4–2 | 2–2 | 4–0 | 2–1 | 3–3 | 2–0 | 1–2 | 3–0 | 1–0 |
| Dunmow Town | 3–3 | 1–2 | 2–3 | 3–5 | 4–2 | 3–4 | 2–3 | 1–4 | — | 2–2 | 0–2 | 3–2 | 0–2 | 1–4 | 0–1 | 5–1 | 1–6 | 7–1 | 0–3 | 4–3 | 1–1 |
| Enfield Borough | 1–1 | 3–1 | 2–3 | 3–3 | 2–5 | 4–3 | 1–4 | 0–2 | 4–2 | — | 4–2 | 3–2 | 0–1 | 2–3 | 0–2 | 1–1 | 0–6 | 4–0 | 3–2 | 0–4 | 2–1 |
| FC Baresi | 0–2 | 1–2 | 1–1 | 2–2 | 3–6 | 3–4 | 0–1 | 2–2 | 2–1 | 4–2 | — | 0–5 | 1–1 | 2–3 | 2–1 | 2–1 | 1–2 | 5–2 | 1–6 | 2–3 | 2–3 |
| FC Romania | 1–0 | 3–3 | 2–1 | 3–4 | 2–0 | 4–4 | 0–3 | 0–3 | 2–6 | 3–2 | 1–2 | — | 1–3 | 1–3 | 4–5 | 6–3 | 0–6 | 2–2 | 2–2 | 0–1 | 1–1 |
| Hoddesdon Town | 2–1 | 2–0 | 3–1 | 2–2 | 1–2 | 2–1 | 1–1 | 1–0 | 0–0 | 2–1 | 3–2 | 1–1 | — | 2–2 | 2–0 | 5–1 | 1–0 | 2–3 | 0–1 | 2–0 | 1–1 |
| Hutton | 3–2 | 2–2 | 5–1 | 4–0 | 1–0 | 2–1 | 0–3 | 1–0 | 6–0 | 4–1 | 6–0 | 3–0 | 2–0 | — | 2–1 | 3–0 | 1–1 | 1–2 | 1–0 | 3–0 | 3–3 |
| Lymore Gardens | 1–0 | 2–0 | 0–1 | 4–2 | 0–3 | 4–0 | 1–3 | 1–1 | 2–0 | 2–0 | 0–2 | 2–1 | 5–1 | 3–3 | — | 5–2 | 2–2 | 3–2 | 2–1 | 4–1 | 4–1 |
| May & Baker | 3–3 | 0–2 | 3–2 | 0–4 | 1–7 | 1–0 | 0–3 | 2–3 | 1–1 | 2–3 | 4–2 | 5–3 | 3–0 | 2–2 | 2–2 | — | 2–5 | 2–4 | 1–1 | 2–3 | 1–1 |
| Newbury Forest | 3–0 | 2–1 | 3–1 | 4–4 | 5–3 | 0–3 | 4–2 | 1–2 | 5–0 | 5–0 | 3–0 | 2–1 | 2–1 | 2–4 | 1–2 | 2–0 | — | 5–5 | 1–2 | 0–0 | 2–4 |
| NW London | 0–1 | 3–0 | 2–6 | 1–5 | 2–4 | 4–3 | 0–5 | 1–2 | 4–4 | 4–1 | 3–2 | 1–1 | 1–2 | 3–4 | 2–3 | 2–2 | 1–4 | — | 2–2 | 4–2 | 0–1 |
| Rayleigh Town | 8–0 | 4–0 | 1–2 | 2–1 | 1–2 | 5–0 | 0–1 | 2–2 | 4–1 | 1–0 | 3–0 | 4–0 | 4–1 | 0–2 | 4–1 | 2–4 | 3–4 | 4–1 | — | 5–0 | 2–2 |
| Southend Manor | 1–3 | 1–6 | 1–7 | 3–0 | 3–3 | 2–2 | 0–4 | 2–6 | 3–0 | 1–3 | 3–2 | 1–4 | 2–1 | 0–1 | 0–1 | 3–2 | 0–5 | 3–2 | 0–3 | — | 0–3 |
| Stansted | 0–0 | 2–0 | 2–2 | 1–3 | 2–2 | 2–2 | 3–2 | 0–1 | 2–0 | 2–1 | 1–1 | 1–0 | 5–1 | 1–3 | 2–2 | 1–2 | 3–1 | 11–0 | 4–1 | 4–1 | — |

Source: The FA Full-Time
Legend: Blue = home team win; Yellow = draw; Red = away team win.
For upcoming matches, an "a" indicates there is an article about the rivalry between the two participants.

=== Stadia and locations ===
Locations of Division One South clubs
Greater London Division One South football clubs

| Team | Location | Stadium | Capacity |
|---|---|---|---|
| AS London | London (Wood Green) | New River Stadium | 5,000 |
| Barkingside | Ilford (Barkingside) | Cricklefield Stadium (groundshare with Ilford) | 3,500 |
| Basildon Town | Basildon | Gardiners Close (groundshare with Basildon United) | 2,000 |
| Brimsdown | London (Brimsdown) | Wormley Playing Fields (groundshare with Wormley Rovers) | 500 |
| Burnham Ramblers | Burnham-on-Crouch | Leslie Fields | 2,000 |
| Cannons Wood | Harlow | Parkside Stadium (groundshare with Aveley) | 3,500 |
| Clapton Community | London (Forest Gate) | The Old Spotted Dog Ground | 2,000 |
| Coggeshall Town | Coggeshall | West Street | 2,000 |
| Dunmow Town | Great Dunmow | Scraley Road (groundshare with Heybridge Swifts) | 3,000 |
| Enfield Borough | Enfield | The Maurice Rebak Stadium (groundshare with Wingate & Finchley) | 1,500 |
| FC Baresi | London | Wodson Park (groundshare with Ware) | 3,300 |
| FC Romania | Cheshunt | Theobalds Lane (groundshare with Cheshunt) | 3,000 |
| Hoddesdon Town | Hoddesdon | Lowfield | 3,000 |
| Hutton | Hutton | New Lodge (groundshare with Billericay Town) | 3,500 |
| Lymore Gardens | London (Waltham Forest) | Oakside Stadium (groundshare with Redbridge) | 3,000 |
| May & Baker | Dagenham | Parsloes Park (groundshare with Athletic Newham) | 1,500 |
| Newbury Forest | Ilford (Barkingside) | Oakside Stadium (groundshare with Redbridge) | 3,000 |
| NW London | London (Tottenham) | Coles Park (groundshare with Haringey Borough) | 2,500 |
| Rayleigh Town | Rayleigh | Thames Road (groundshare with Concord Rangers) | 3,300 |
| Southend Manor | Southend-on-Sea | Southchurch Park | 2,000 |
| Stansted | Stansted Mountfitchet | Hargrave Park | 2,000 |

=== Statistics ===
| Team | Average | Highest | Lowest |
|---|---|---|---|
| Clapton CFC | 697 | 2,375 vs Rayleigh Town (PO Final) | 115 vs Barkingside |
| Coggeshall Town | 103 | 165 vs Clapton CFC | 82 vs AS London |
| Rayleigh Town | 81 | 151 vs Basildon Town | 48 vs FC Baresi |
| Stansted | 79 | 113 vs Enfield Borough | 48 vs NW London |
| Hoddesdon Town | 78 | 105 vs Clapton CFC | 58 vs Stansted |
| Burnham Ramblers | 76 | 114 vs Clapton CFC | 51 vs Enfield Borough & Hoddesdon Town |
| Barkingside | 76 | 189 vs Clapton CFC | 48 vs Rayleigh Town |
| Hutton | 68 | 104 vs Rayleigh Town | 33 vs Barkingside |
| Lymore Gardens | 66 | 115 vs Brimsdown & Stansted | 39 vs AS London |
| Basildon Town | 65 | 114 vs Clapton CFC | 45 vs Newbury Forest |
| Southend Manor | 46 | 74 vs Clapton CFC | 18 vs FC Baresi |
| Cannons Wood | 45 | 150 vs Brimsdown | 20 vs Burnham Ramblers, Newbury Forest & May & Baker |
| AS London | 45 | 215 vs May & Baker | 10 vs NW London |
| FC Romania | 42 | 72 vs Hoddesdon Town | 26 vs Enfield Borough |
| Brimsdown | 38 | 50 vs FC Romania & Stansted | 15 vs Cannons Wood |
| Dunmow Town | 28 | 72 vs Clapton CFC | 10 vs FC Baresi & FC Romania |
| NW London | 21 | 48 vs Enfield Borough | 10 vs Newbury Forest & FC Romania |
| Newbury Forest | 19 | 50 vs Barkingside | 15 vs AS London, Hutton, Southend Manor & Burnham Ramblers |
| FC Baresi | 15 | 55 vs Clapton CFC | 6 vs Southend Manor |
| Enfield Borough* | N/A | | |
| May & Baker* | N/A | | |

*Enfield Borough & May & Baker attendances are limited on FA Full Time therefore an average cannot be found.
