= Cliff Akurang =

Ghanaian footballer

Personal information
- Full name: Cliff Danquah Akurang
- Date of birth: 27 February 1981 (age 45)
- Place of birth: Accra, Ghana
- Height: 1.88 m (6 ft 2 in)
- Position: Striker

Youth career
- Senrab
- Chelsea
- Luton Town

Senior career*
Years	Team	Apps	(Gls)
1999–2000	Chesham United	2	(1)
2000–2001	Hitchin Town	25	(7)
2001–2005	Thurrock	104	(38)
2004–2006	Heybridge Swifts	45	(31)
2005–2006	→ Dagenham & Redbridge (loan)	3	(1)
2006–2007	Dagenham & Redbridge	42	(7)
2007	→ Thurrock (loan)	17	(10)
2007–2008	Histon	19	(10)
2008–2010	Barnet	45	(10)
2009	→ Weymouth (loan)	8	(2)
2009–2010	→ Rushden & Diamonds (loan)	35	(8)
2010	Thurrock	12	(7)
2010–2011	Maidenhead United	12	(3)
2011	Braintree Town	14	(7)
2011–2012	Chelmsford City	33	(10)
2012	Bishop's Stortford	2	(1)
2012–2013	Boreham Wood	32	(4)
2013	→ Canvey Island (dual registration)	2	(0)
2013–2014	Bishop's Stortford	31	(11)
2014	Leiston	8	(0)
2014	Hayes & Yeading United	1	(0)
2014	Maldon & Tiptree	9	(7)
2015–2016	Billericay Town	0	(0)
2016	Canvey Island	12	(5)
2016	Coggeshall Town		
2016–2017	Bishop's Stortford	0	(0)
2017–2022	Coggeshall United	25	(4)
2023	The Rodings	1	(1)
2025–2026	Kings Park Rangers	4	(0)

Managerial career
- 2014–2015: Heybridge Swifts
- 2017–2022: Coggeshall United
- 2022: Coggeshall Town
- * Club domestic league appearances and goals as of 04:18, 17 June 2023 (UTC)

Cliff Danquah Akurang (born 27 February 1981) is a former professional footballer who played in the Football League for Barnet.

== Early life ==
Akurang was born in Accra.

== Career ==
After prolific spells at Heybridge Swifts and Thurrock, he joined Dagenham & Redbridge and then Histon. He found his form at Bridge Road, scoring several goals in the first half of the 2007–08 season – including a hat-trick against Torquay United. His performances attracted the attention of Barnet, who signed him in January 2008. However, he struggled for form at Underhill and, in March 2009, he joined Weymouth on loan. In the summer of 2009, he joined Rushden & Diamonds on a season long loan. Akurang was released by Barnet at the end of the 2009–10 season and rejoined Thurrock on a one-year contract, leaving on 1 November 2010. He moved on to Maidenhead in November 2010 and Braintree Town on his thirtieth birthday, 27 February 2011. On 12 September 2015, it was announced that Akurang had joined Billericay Town but moved to local rivals Canvey Island in February 2016. Akurang finished the 2017–18 Essex & Suffolk Border League season with Coggeshall United, scoring four goals in 12 league appearances. In September 2023, Akurang made an appearance for Essex and Suffolk Border League side The Rodings. During the 2025–26 season, Akurang made four appearances for Kings Park Rangers.

== Managerial career ==
In December 2014, Akurang was appointed manager of Heybridge Swifts, following the departure of previous manager Keith Hill. He left Heybridge Swifts being sacked on 8 September 2015. In the summer of 2017, Akurang became player-manager of newly founded Coggeshall United. Later in the season he also became chairman. He was appointed manager of Coggeshall Town in May 2022, but left the club in October the same year.

== Honours ==
Dagenham & Redbridge

- Conference National: 2006–07
