= Clapton C.F.C. =

Association football club in England

Coordinates: 51.5974°N 0.008996°W

Clapton
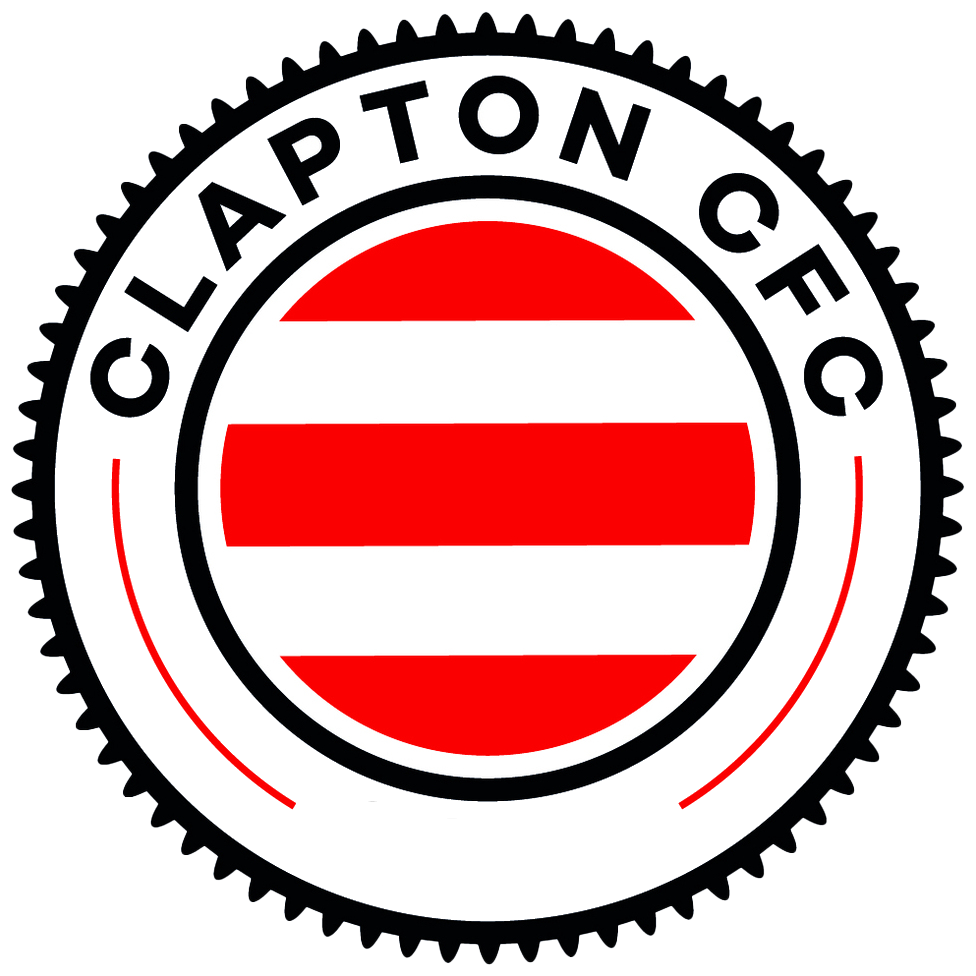
- Full name: Clapton Community Football Club
- Founded: 27 January 2018; 8 years ago
- Ground: The Old Spotted Dog Ground, Forest Gate
- Capacity: 2,000 (100 seated)
- Owner: Fan Owned
- Manager: Alice Sharpe (women's team); Geoff Ocran (men's team)
- League: Essex Senior League
- 2025–26: Eastern Counties League Division One South, 2nd of 21 (promoted via play-offs)
- Website: https://www.claptoncfc.co.uk/
Home colours	Away colours

Clapton Community Football Club is a supporters fan owned members football club based in Forest Gate, London, England. Their men's team are currently members of the Essex Senior League. Their women's team compete in the London and South East Women's Regional Football League Division One North. Both teams play at The Old Spotted Dog in Forest Gate.

== History ==
Clapton Community was formed on 27 January 2018 by disillusioned supporters of Clapton F.C. after what they deemed as mismanagement of the club by chairman Vince McBean. During the club's debut season, they sold 11,500 away shirts, with 5,500 to Spain, after the kit was based on the International Brigades and the Flag of the Second Spanish Republic.

In April 2019, CE Júpiter hosted Clapton in a friendly match which celebrated the Spanish Republican spirit, with Clapton wearing kits inspired by the Second Spanish Republic and International Brigades. The match was touted as symbolising both clubs' commitment to anti-fascism and working class identity.

On 11 May 2019, Clapton won the Middlesex County League Division One (Central and East), gaining promotion to the Premier Division, after a 3–0 win against FC Roast. The club entered the FA Vase for the first time in 2019–20.

In June 2019, the club announced the formation of a women's team with the former AFC Stoke Newington first team coming under the Clapton Community banner. The women's team competed in Division One of the Greater London Women's Football League in the 2019–20 season but were promoted to the London and South East Women's Regional Football League Division One North in the 2021–22 season.

While the October 2020 Polish protests were taking place, the women's team expressed solidarity with the protesters by posing next to a banner dedicated to the women's rights protest, which has been noticed by Polish media.

On 12 March 2021, the club won the Football Supporter Association's 'Lockdown Heroes' award for their Community Fund initiative, 'Clapton against Corona', fundraising and providing financial assistance to local people whose livelihood was affected by coronavirus. The original club withdrew from competition in advance of the 2024–25 season, leaving Clapton CFC as the district's primary football club. In May 2025, they defeated Forest Hill Park in the final of the SCEFL Division One Cup. Having been unsuccessful in their appeal the previous year, the club were successfully transferred back to the Eastern Counties League ahead of the 2025–26 season.

In February 2025, following an AGM resolution, the club established Men’s Over 35s team which joined the Essex Veterans League in the team’s inaugural 2025/2026 season. The team finish third in Division Three (West).

== Ground ==
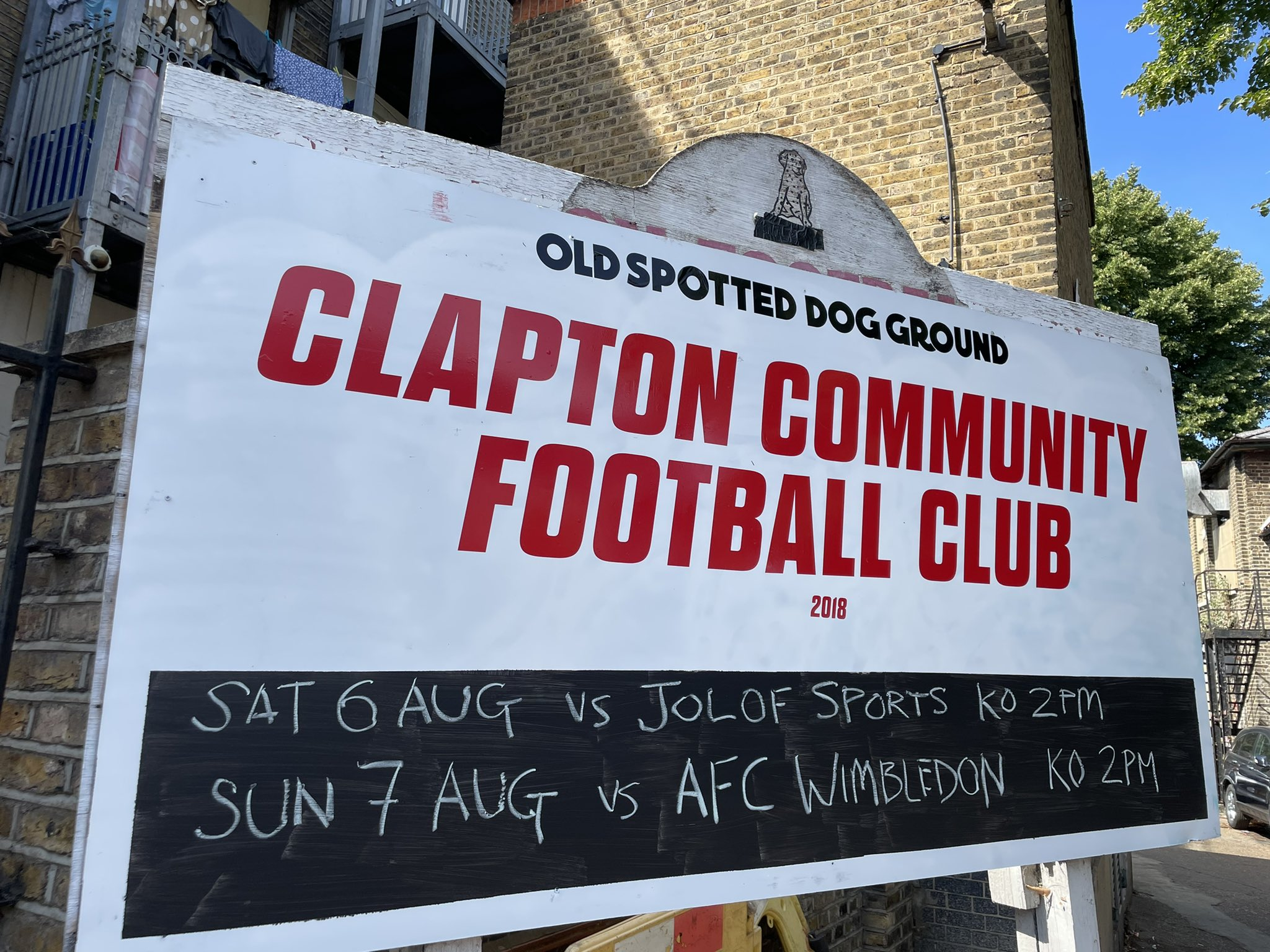
The sign in front of the Old Spotted Dog Ground

Both the women's and men's first teams play at The Old Spotted Dog in Forest Gate.

On 17 September 2019, it was confirmed that Clapton Community had been awarded the lease at The Old Spotted Dog, following Clapton FC's eviction. On 24 July 2020, Clapton Community announced that they had purchased the freehold for The Old Spotted Dog and become the new owners.

From 2022 the women's first team play at The Old Spotted Dog, using changing rooms at the nearby Stratford School. After completion of the purchase of adjacent warehouse and renovation of the old changing rooms, the men's first team were able to join the women's first team in using The Old Spotted Dog as their home ground. Clapton Community youth teams train at the ground.

The men's development team, the women's development team and the women's open access team all usually play at Hackney Marshes. Clapton five-a-side teams, Clapton CFC Belters and Clapton CFC Massive play at Mabley Green in Hackney.

== Supporters ==
Supporters of the club are known to be left-wing and are self-proclaimed anti-fascist. The club have a number of ultras groups such as the Clapton Punks, the Gravy Ultras, and the UmarellOldtras.

== Honours and awards ==
- Southern Counties East Football League
  - Division One Cup: 2024–25
- Middlesex County League
  - Premier Division champions: 2022–23
  - Division One (Central and East) champions: 2018–19
- Hackney & Leyton Sunday Football League (Men's Development Team)
  - Division 3 champions: 2021–22
  - Division 2 promotion: 2022–23
  - Division 1 promotion: 2023–24
- Jim Rogers President's Cup
  - Winners: 2018–19
- Alec Smith Premier Division Cup
  - Winners: 2021–22
- John Greenacre Memorial Trophy
  - Winners: 2021–22
- The FSA Memorial Supporters' Shield
  - Winners: 2023–24, 2024-25 (Women)
  - Runners-up: 2023–24 (Men)
- Anagram Records Trophy
  - Runners-up: 2018–19
- Brian Lomax SD Cup
  - Runners-up: 2018–19
- Capital Women's Cup
  - Runners-up: 2021–22
- London & South East Regional Women's League Trophy
  - Runners-up: 2022–23
- Super 5 League (Women's 5s Team)
  - Winners: 2020–21
- Super 5s Beginners League (Women's 5s Team)
  - Winners: 2021
- Super 5s Legacy Tournament (Women's 5s Team)
  - Winners: 2022
- Super 5s Beginners League (Women's 5s Team)
  - Winners 2022
- Amsterdam friendly tournament (Women's 5s Team)
  - Winners: 2022
- Super 5 League Intermediate B (Women's 5s Team)
  - Runners-up: 2022
- East London Ladies FC Anniversary Beginners Tournament (Clapton Cageys)
  - Winners: 2024
- FSA Award Lockdown Heroes (Non-League)
  - Winners: 2020–21
- Non-League Paper Community Club of the Year Award
  - Winners: 2022–23

London Womens Saturday League Division 2 winners 2023/24

== Records ==
- Best FA Women's Cup performance: Third round, 2021–22
- Best FA Vase performance: Second round, 2024–25
- Highest Men's First Team home attendance: 2,375 vs Rayleigh Town, 2 May 2026
