= Lymore Gardens F.C. =

Coordinates: 51°35′7″N 0°5′22″E

Lymore Gardens
- Full name: Lymore Gardens Football Club
- Founded: 2016
- Ground: Oakside Stadium, Barkingside
- Capacity: 3,000 (316 seated)
- Owner: Lee Benjamin
- Chairman: Lee Benjamin
- Manager: Lee Benjamin
- League: Eastern Counties League Division One South
- 2025–26: Eastern Counties League Division One South, 5th of 21
- Website: lymoregardensfc.com

Lymore Gardens Football Club is a football club based in Waltham Forest, London. They are currently members of the Eastern Counties League Division One South and play at the Oakside Stadium.

== History ==
Lymore Gardens Football Club was founded by Lee Benjamin in 2016 as a Sunday league team and he became the club's first and current manager. Lymore Gardens became a non-League club on 12 October 2020.

Lymore Gardens were admitted to Senior Divion One of the Essex Alliance League (with the Reserves in Division Two) ahead of the 2021–22 season, and the club's first official match was a 4–1 victory against FC Baresi on 21 August 2021. Lymore Gardens then finished as runners-up in the 2021–22 Essex Alliance League Senior Cup and they won the Division One Cup in 2023–24.

The club then finished as runners-up in Senior Division One in 2024–25 and were promoted to step 6 of the National League System for the first time in the club's history when Philip United's promotion was rescinded. The club was placed in the Eastern Counties Football League Division One South for the 2025–26 season and they reached the FA Vase fifth round during their inaugural season in the competition.

=== Season by season record ===
Season	Teams	League	Position	Pld	W	D	L	GF	GA	GD	Pts	Promotion playoffs	FA Cup	FA Trophy	FA Vase	Other
2021–22	13	Essex Alliance Football League Senior Division One	5th	24	14	3	7	58	37	+21	45	—				Essex Alliance Football League Senior Cup Runners-up
2022–23	17	Essex Alliance Football League Senior Division One	8th	32	17	4	11	68	60	+8	55	—				Essex Alliance Football League Division One Cup First round; Essex Alliance Football League Division Two Cup Quarter-finals
2023–24	15	Essex Alliance Football League Senior Division One	7th	28	12	6	10	86	71	+15	41	—				Essex Alliance Football League Division One Cup Champions; Essex Premier Cup Second round
2024–25	16	Essex Alliance Football League Senior Division One	2nd	30	21	5	4	101	46	+55	68	—				Essex Alliance Football League Division One Cup Quarter-finals; Essex Premier Cup First round
2025–26	21	Eastern Counties Football League Division One South	5th	40	22	5	13	79	63	+16	71	SF	—		5R	Essex Senior Cup Second round; Eastern Counties Football League Cup Second round

== Stadium ==
Lymore Gardens' home ground is Oakside Stadium, which they groundshare with Redbridge. They have also previously played at Ive Farm Lane, Jubilee Park and Parmiters School.

== Records ==
- Best FA Vase performance: Fifth round, 2025–26

== Honours ==
- Essex Alliance League
  - Division One Cup winners 2023–24
  - Senior Cup runners-up 2021–22
