= F.C. Peterborough =

Coordinates: 52°35′40.71″N 0°13′32.92″W

FC Peterborough
- Full name: Football Club Peterborough
- Founded: 2014; 12 years ago
- Ground: The Focus Centre, Peterborough
- Chairman: Arif Aziz
- Manager: Shahzad Hamid
- League: United Counties League Premier Division South
- 2025–26: Eastern Counties League Division One North, 4th of 20 (promoted via play-offs)
Home colours

Football Club Peterborough is a football club based in Peterborough, England. They are currently members of the United Counties League Premier Division South and play at The Focus Centre, Peterborough.

== History ==
In 2014, F.C. Peterborough was formed by Kamran Khan, joining the Peterborough and District Football League Division Five. In 2023, the club was admitted into the Eastern Counties Division One North.

== Ground ==
In 2022, the club moved into The Focus Centre, Peterborough, after playing at Fulbridge Road in the north of the city.

== Records ==
- Best FA Vase performance: First round, 2026–27
