= Holland F.C. =

Association football club in England

Coordinates: 51.799052°N 1.1767692°E

Holland
- Full name: Holland Football Club
- Nicknames: The Tangerines; The Jaffas
- Founded: 2006
- Ground: Dulwich Road, Holland-on-Sea
- Chairman: Mark Sorrell
- Manager: Luke Watts
- League: Eastern Counties League Division One North
- 2025–26: Eastern Counties League Division One North, 2nd of 20
Home colours	Away colours

Holland Football Club is a football club based in Holland-on-Sea, Essex, England. They are currently members of the Eastern Counties League Division One North and play at Dulwich Road.

== History ==
The club was established in 2006, and joined Division Two of the Essex & Suffolk Border League in the same year. They won the Tommy Thompson Cup in their first season in the league. Division Two was disbanded at the end of the 2006–07 season and the club moved up to Division One. In 2008–09 they won Division One, earning promotion to the Premier Division; the season also saw them win the Essex Premier Cup, beating Maldon St Mary's 1–0 in the final. After finishing fourth in the Premier Division in 2014–15, the club applied for promotion to the Eastern Counties League, but were rejected as they had proposed groundsharing with FC Clacton, with FA rules stating that groundshares should have been in place for at least a year prior to promotion.

However, after Holland finished third in the Premier Division in 2015–16, they were promoted to Division One of the Eastern Counties League. When the division was split into northern and southern sections in 2018, the club were placed in Division One South. In 2022 they were transferred to Division One North. The club finished third in the division in 2023–24, qualifying for the promotion play-offs. They defeated Stanway Pegasus 3–0 in the semi-finals, before losing 3–1 to Cornard United in the final. The club were runners-up in Division One North in 2025–26, going on to lose 2–0 to Stanway Pegasus in the play-off semi-finals.

== Ground ==
The club initially played at the Eastcliff Recreation Ground on Dulwich Road. Plans for a stadium upgrade were dropped in 2015, and the club agreed to groundshare with FC Clacton at their Rush Green Bowl ground due to building works at Eastcliff. In 2018 the club returned to Dulwich Road after a £550,000 upgrade that involved installing a new stand and rotating the pitch 90°.

== Honours ==
- Essex & Suffolk Border League
  - Division One champions 2008–09
  - Tommy Thompson Cup winners 2006–07
- Essex Premier Cup
  - Winners 2008–09

== Records ==
- Best FA Vase performance: Second Round 2026-27

== See also ==
- Holland F.C. players
