= Maurice Norman =

English footballer (1934–2022)

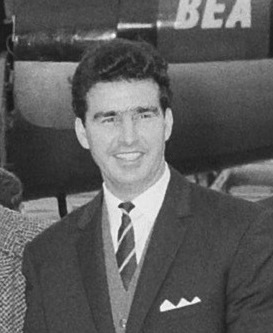
- Norman in 1964

Personal information
- Full name: Maurice Norman
- Date of birth: 8 May 1934
- Place of birth: Mulbarton, England
- Date of death: 27 November 2022 (aged 88)
- Position: Defender

Senior career*
Years	Team	Apps	(Gls)
1952–1955	Norwich City	35	(0)
1955–1966	Tottenham Hotspur	357	(16)
Total		392	(16)

International career
1962–1964	England	23	(0)
- * Club domestic league appearances and goals

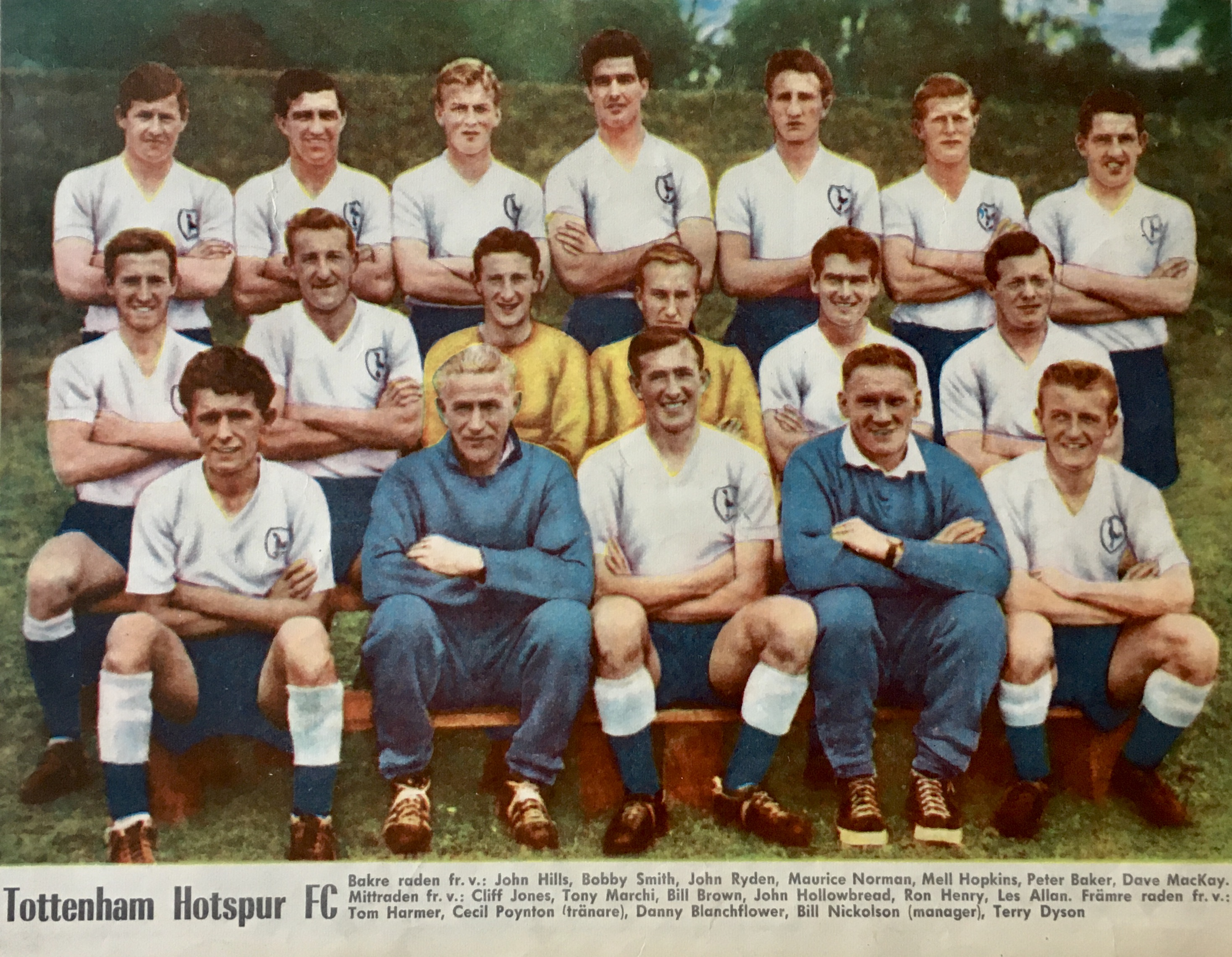
Tottenham Hotspur in 1960 with Danny Blanchflower (captain) and both goalkeepers, Bill Brown and John Hollowbread, in the team with Cecil Poynton as trainer and Bill Nicholson as manager. Maurice Norman is the fourth player standing.

Maurice Norman (8 May 1934 – 27 November 2022) was an English footballer who played nearly 400 times in the Football League as a centre half for Norwich City and Tottenham Hotspur. At international level, Norman won 23 caps for the England national team.

== Club career ==
Norman was born in Mulbarton, Norfolk. He began his career at Norwich City, and played 35 league matches for the Canaries between 1952 and 1955. Despite such a short career with the club, he was elected into the Norwich City Hall of Fame in 2002. He signed for Tottenham Hotspur in November 1955 for a £28,000 transfer fee, that also included the return transfer of Ireland international striker Johnny Gavin to Norwich. Norman played his first game for his new club against Cardiff City, and stayed at White Hart Lane until 1965, making 411 first-team appearances and scoring 19 goals for Spurs. He was an integral part of Bill Nicholson's Double-winning Tottenham team of 1960–61 that went on to retain the FA Cup in 1962, and win the 1963 Cup Winners' Cup.

== International career ==
At international level, Norman made 23 appearances for England, including in the 1962 World Cup. He was also a member of the England squad at the 1958 World Cup, but did not play. He suffered a double fracture of tibia and fibula playing for Spurs against a Hungarian Select XI in November 1965, which brought a premature end to his career.

== Personal life and death ==
In 2014, Norman was diagnosed with vascular dementia.

Norman died from cancer on 27 November 2022, at the age of 88.

== Honours ==
Tottenham Hotspur

- English 1st division: 1960–61
- FA Cup: 1960–61, 1961–62
- UEFA European Cup Winners' Cup: 1962/63
