= Dussindale & Hellesdon Rovers F.C. =

Coordinates: 52°40′36.62″N 1°15′28.51″E

Dussindale & Hellesdon Rovers
- Full name: Dussindale & Hellesdon Rovers Football Club
- Nickname: Dussy
- Founded: 2020; 6 years ago
- Ground: The Nest, Horsford
- Capacity: 1,000
- Chairman: Graeme Bird
- Manager: Ian Bird
- League: Eastern Counties League Division One North
- 2025–26: Eastern Counties League Division One North, 14th of 20
Home colours

Dussindale & Hellesdon Rovers Football Club is a football club based in Norwich, England. They are currently members of the Eastern Counties League Division One North and play at The Nest.

== History ==
In May 2020, Dussindale & Hellesdon Rovers were formed by the merger of Dussindale Rovers and Hellesdon. Hellesdon pre-dated Dussindale Rovers, having entered senior football in 2011, whilst Dussindale were still a Sunday league team. In 2016, Dussindale joined the Norwich & District League, joining the Anglian Combination in 2017 after winning the league. In 2023, the club was admitted into the Eastern Counties Division One North after winning the Anglian Combination.

== Ground ==
The club currently play at The Nest in Horsford.

== Records ==
- Best FA Vase performance: Second qualifying round: 2023–24, 2026–27
