= Mulbarton, Norfolk =

Village in Norfolk, England

Coordinates: 52.5872°N 1.2253°E

Mulbarton
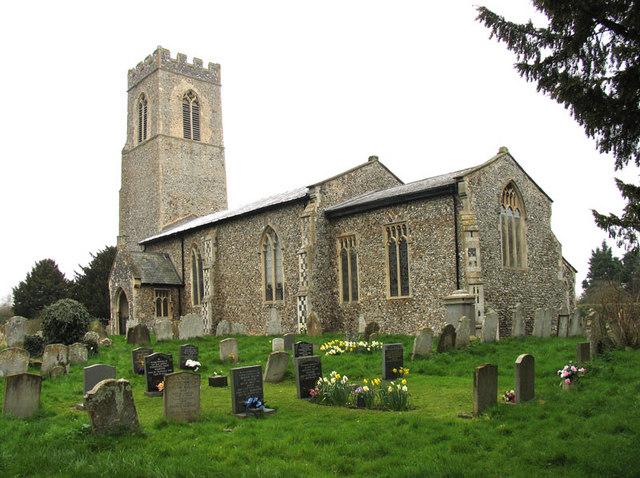
- St Mary Magdalene Church

- Location within Norfolk
- Area: 5.34 km^{2} (2.06 sq mi)
- Population: 3,521 (2011)
  - Density: 659/km^{2} (1,710/sq mi)
- OS grid reference: TG187003
- Civil parish: Mulbarton
- District: South Norfolk
- Shire county: Norfolk
- Region: East
- Country: England
- Sovereign state: United Kingdom
- Post town: NORWICH
- Postcode district: NR14
- Dialling code: 01508
- Police: Norfolk
- Fire: Norfolk
- Ambulance: East of England
- UK Parliament: South Norfolk

Mulbarton is a village and civil parish located south of Norwich in the English county of Norfolk. It covers an area of 5.34 km^{2} (2.06 sq mi).

The place-name 'Mulbarton' is first attested in the Domesday Book of 1086, where it appears as Molkebertuna and Molkebertestuna. The name means "outlying dairy farm", the first element being the Old English 'meoluc' meaning 'milk', and the second element the Old English 'beretun' meaning 'barley town or settlement', hence 'farm'.

The population at the 2001 census was 2,827, increasing to 3,521 at the 2011 census.

Facilities include one school (Mulbarton Primary School), an Adnams' public house, The World's End, a social club, two convenience stores (Spar and Co-op), a church, a fish-and-chip shop, a Chinese takeaway, and a MOT and vehicle repair centre. There is a regular bus service to Norwich. In the centre of the village is a large common, with a pond where many ducks live. The remains of a windmill stand on the Norwich Road.

== Governance ==
An electoral ward in the same name exists. This ward stretches north west to Ketteringham with a total population taken at the 2011 census of 5,121.

== Sport ==
The village also has its own non league football club, Mulbarton Wanderers F.C. who currently play in the Eastern Counties Football League at the Mulberry Park ground.

== Notable people ==
- Maurice Norman, the former Norwich City, Tottenham Hotspur and England footballer, was born in Mulbarton
- Sir Edward Wingfield, a retired civil servant, lived at Mulbarton Hall in the early 1900s.
