= AS London F.C. =

Association football club in England

AS London
- Full name: All Stars London Football Club
- Founded: 1991; 35 years ago
- Ground: New River Stadium, Wood Green
- Capacity: 5,000
- Manager: Ernest Eghan
- League: Eastern Counties League Division One South
- 2025–26: Eastern Counties League Division One South, 13th of 21
Home colours

All Stars London Football Club is a football club based in Tottenham, England. They are currently members of the Eastern Counties League Division One South and play at the New River Sports Stadium (formerly New River Community Sports Centre).

== History ==
The club was formed in 1991 as a group of friends organising matches on a Sunday under the name of Park View FC. In 2003 the club affiliated with the Middlesex County Football Association (MCFA) and joined the Ghana Football Society (GFS) League.

In 2007 the club joined Division One Central & East of the Middlesex County League, going on to win the division at the first attempt, but then left the league. They entered Division One of the London Commercial League in 2012, and were runners-up in 2013–14. The club then switched to the Amateur Football Combination, entering Intermediate Division One North. After winning the division at the first attempt, the club were promoted to Senior Division Two North and went on to win a second successive title, earning promotion to Senior Division One. They subsequently won the Division One title in 2016–17, and then entered the English football league system, joining Division Two of the Spartan South Midlands League. The club were unbeaten Division Two League Champions as well as Division Two Cup Winners in their first season in the league, earning promotion to Division One.

The club in its early years drew many of its players from the Ghanaian community in London but can now boast of a diverse mix.

In June 2024 Park View was renamed to All Stars London (styled as AS London) for the 2024–25 season.

== Ground ==
The club play their home games at the New River Stadium. The stadium has a capacity of 5,000 with a grandstand that seats 1,000. The stadium has a 3G artificial pitch surrounded by an athletics track.

== Honours ==
- Spartan South Midlands Football League
  - Division Two League Champions 2017–18
  - Division Two Cup Winners 2017–18
- Middlesex County Football League
  - Division One Central & East champions 2007–08
- Amateur Football Combination
  - Senior Division One champions 2016–17
  - Senior Division Two North champions 2015–16
  - Intermediate Division North champions 2014–15

== Records ==
- Highest league position: 13th in the Spartan South Midlands League Division One, 2018–19
- Best FA Cup performance: Extra preliminary round, 2020–21
