= The Old Spotted Dog Ground =

Football ground in London

Coordinates: 51°32′32″N 0°1′17″E

- 'The Dog'
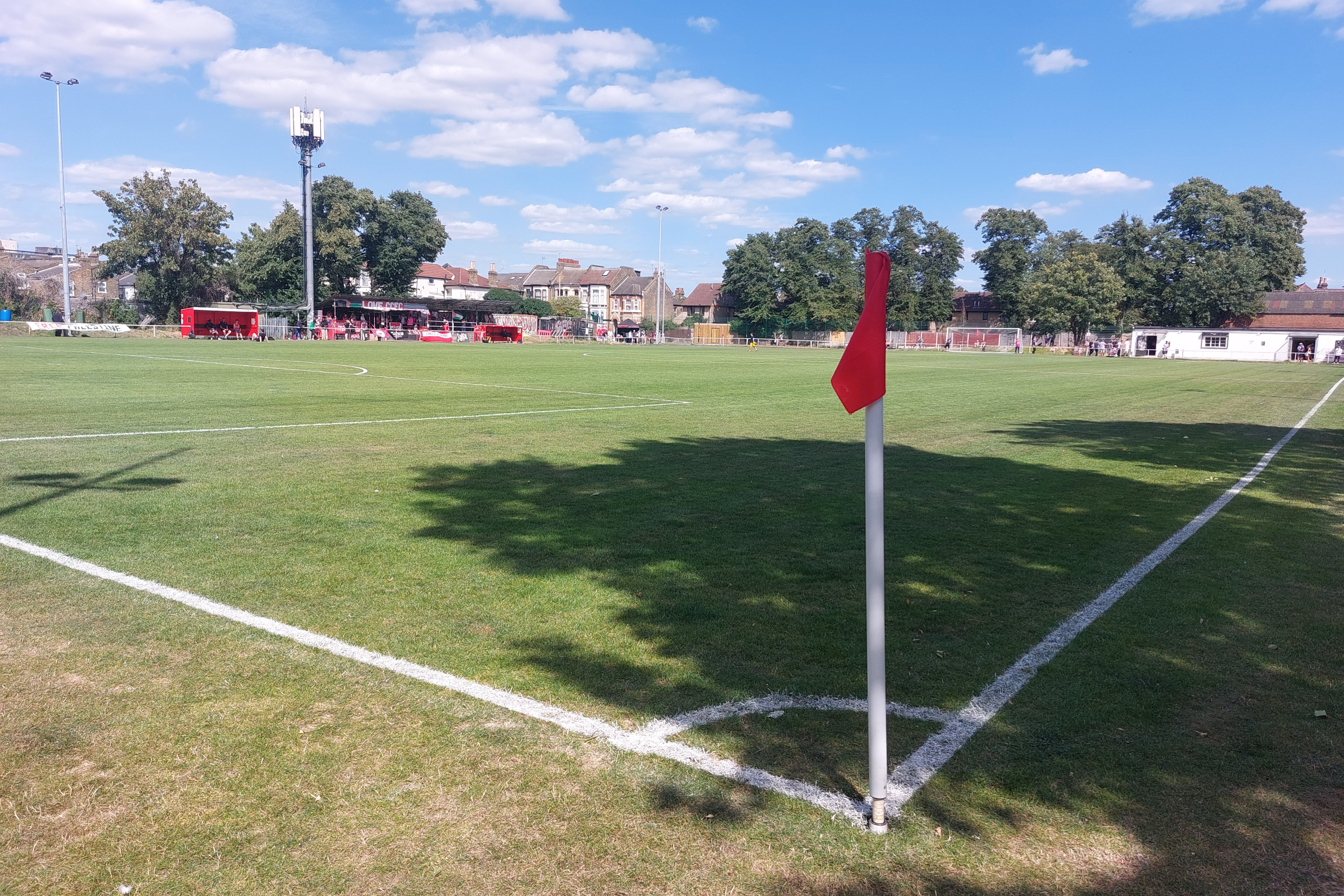
- Old Spotted Dog Ground in 2025
- Interactive map of The Old Spotted Dog Ground
- Location: Forest Gate, London
- Capacity: 2,000 (100 seated)
- Field size: 45 × 90 ft
- Public transit: Forest Gate

Construction
- Opened: 1888

Tenants
- Clapton (1888–2019); London Bari (2012–2017); Hackney Wick (2017–2019); Clapton Community (2023–present)

Website
- https://www.oldspotted.dog/

The location of The Old Spotted Dog Ground within the London Borough of Newham.

The Old Spotted Dog Ground in Forest Gate is the oldest senior football ground in London. Clapton Community FC, a fan-owned club, purchased the ground in June 2020, having been initially awarded the lease.

The previous tenants Clapton FC and Hackney Wick FC were ejected from The Old Spotted Dog in 2018 due in part to a breach in the lease following non-payment of rent. Clapton Community FC Women's team were able to play their first league games at The Dog from September 2022. Projects are under way as of April 2023 to refurbish the ground.

On 26 April 2023, Clapton CFC hosted the first competitive match at The Dog since 2019 when they defeated Kensington Dragons 3–0.

== History ==
The grounds were originally part of the Old Spotted Dog Hunting Lodge, famously used by Henry VIII. The lodge later became a pub, the Spotted Dog, still featuring parts of its original facade, is now a Grade II listed building (although closed down in 2004 the structure has since fallen into disrepair). The lands behind the pub became a sports ground, used primarily for county cricket matches before switching its usage to football.

Clapton FC moved to the ground in 1888 after learning that St Bartholomew's Hospital had given up their tenancy. The former Hackney club played the first match at the ground on 29 September 1888 against Old Carthusians, winning 1–0 in front of over 4,000 spectators. The highest attendance at the ground for a Clapton match was recorded as 12,000 for an FA Cup game against Tottenham Hotspur during the 1898–99 season.

Clapton's former status as one of English football's leading amateur clubs saw The Old Spotted Dog host a number of high-profile matches, including contests with, West Ham United, Tottenham Hotspur and Ajax of Amsterdam. Neighbours, West Ham, also used the ground as home to their youth and 'A' teams during the 1960s and brought their World Cup winning stars to feature in The Dog's first match under floodlights in 1966.

During World War II the ground was used as an anti-aircraft station.

=== Tenancy dispute ===
At the start of the 2019–20 season, Clapton FC lost the lease for the ground, due to non-payment of rent. This marked the end of their 140-year playing history at the site.

On 17 September 2019, it was announced that Clapton Community FC, a fan-owned club built by former fans of Clapton FC in 2018, had been awarded the lease to the ground, allowing the new fan operated club to play there.

On 24 July 2020, Clapton Community FC announced that they had purchased the freehold for The Old Spotted Dog and become the new owners.

== See also ==
- Football in London
