= Mabley Green =

Park in London, United Kingdom

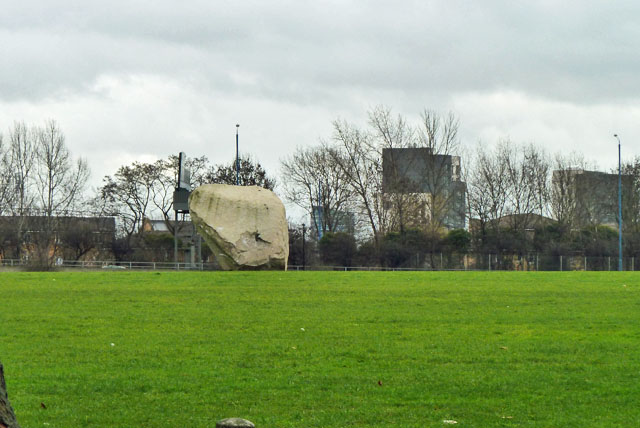
- Rock in Mabley Green recreation ground
- Interactive map of Mabley Green
- Type: Public park
- Location: London, England
- Coordinates: 51°32′57″N 0°01′57″W
- Area: 35.5 acres (14.4 ha)
- Status: Open year round
- Website: https://hackney.gov.uk/article/3322/Mabley-Green

Mabley Green is a sizeable piece of common land adjacent to Homerton, Clapton Park and Hackney Wick in the east of the London Borough of Hackney measuring 35.5 acres (144,000 m^{2}). Originally it was part of a continuous land mass on both sides of the Lee Navigation that formed the Hackney Marshes. in 1915 a piece of the Marshes was taken to create the National Projectile Factory and after World War I, in 1922, this site was used to create the Mabley Green recreation ground. Located next to the A12 road, it is linked to Hackney Wick and St Mary of Eton via the Red Path walkway and cycle path.

It has an all-weather football pitch, an outdoor gym and basketball hoops. The park holds a Green Flag Award accreditation.

The large and distinctive rock in the centre of the park was placed there in 2008 as part of an art project. It is designed as a rock climbing or bouldering challenge, having several routes of varying difficulty. It can also be viewed as a piece of sculpture. The stone weighs around 60 tonnes and was quarried in Cornwall. A book of photojournalism documenting the community using the wall during the COVID-19 pandemic, Mabley Green Class of '21 was published in 2022.

To ensure adequate provision of football pitches while the East Marsh was being used for Olympic coach parking, the majority of Mabley Green was taken up with football pitches. Most of these are due to be removed from Mabley Green once the East Marsh pitches are restored during 2014. In 2021 a film, Mabley Green, by artist Alice May Williams commemorated the centenary of the Football Association's ban on women's football, celebrating the creation of a 'Munitionettes' women's football team at the location by workers at the National Projectile Factory.

The User Group constitution expresses the ambition to be the UK's first edible park with fruit and nut trees and bushes available for all to enjoy. As part of a consultation process with the council, these plans are currently being considered along with plans to add another all-weather pitch.
