= Rayleigh Town F.C. =

Association football club in England

Coordinates: 51°34′26″N 0°31′5″E

Rayleigh Town
- Full name: Rayleigh Town Football Club
- Founded: 1897; 129 years ago
- Ground: Len Salmon Stadium, Pitsea
- Capacity: 2,000 (200 seated)
- Chairman: Peter Clarke
- Manager: Robert Hodgson
- League: Eastern Counties League Division One South
- 2025–26: Eastern Counties League Division One South, 4th of 21
Home colours

Rayleigh Town Football Club is a football club based in Rayleigh, England. They are currently members of the Eastern Counties League Division One South and play at the Len Salmon Stadium, groundsharing with Bowers & Pitsea.

== History ==
Rayleigh Star were founded in 1897, adopting their current name in 1946. In 1976, after time in the Southend & District League, the club joined the Essex Olympian League. In 1979, the club won the Essex Olympian League for the first time, winning the Premier Division again in 1981, 1984 and 1985. Following two second place finishes in 1987 and 1989, the club won the league for a fifth time in 1990. In 2001, Rayleigh won the league for a sixth time, before being relegated two years later. In 2024, the club was admitted into the Eastern Counties League Division One South, after winning the Essex Olympian League for a seventh time.

== Ground ==
Following World War II, the club played at King George V Playing Field in Rayleigh. In 1970, the club moved to London Road, leasing an 11-acre site from the council. In 2022, Rayleigh Town entered a groundsharing agreement with Concord Rangers to play at Thames Road. On May 6 2026, the club announced the would be groundsharing with Bowers & Pitsea ahead of the 2026–27 season.

== Records ==
- Best FA Vase performance: Second round, 2024–25
