= Kings Park Rangers F.C. =

Association football club in England

Kings Park Rangers
- Full name: Kings Park Rangers Football Club
- Founded: May 2023
- Dissolved: May 2026
- Ground: Blackhouse Lane, Great Cornard
Home colours	Away colours

Kings Park Rangers Football Club was a football club based in Great Cornard, Suffolk, England. They played at Blackhouse Lane, in Great Cornard, a groundshare with Cornard United.

== History ==
Founded in May 2023, the club joined Division One of the Essex and Suffolk Border League for the 2023–24 season. Their first season saw them finish as runners-up in the division, earning promotion to the Premier Division. In 2024–25 they were Premier Division champions, securing promotion to Division One North of the Eastern Counties League.

The following season saw them win the Division One North title. This would have earnt promotion to the Premier Division, but the club announced shortly after the end of the season that they had folded.

== Honours ==
- Eastern Counties League
  - Division One North champions 2025–26
- Essex and Suffolk Border League
  - Premier Division champions 2024–25
