= NW London F.C. =

Association football club in England

Coordinates: 51.642221°N 0.24425536°W

NW London
- Full name: NW London Football Club
- Nickname: The Gorillas
- Founded: 2015; 11 years ago
- Ground: Coles Park Stadium
- Chairman: Samir Naji
- Manager: Wasim Khan
- League: Eastern Counties League Division One South
- 2025–26: Eastern Counties League Division One South, 19th of 21
Home colours

NW London Football Club is a football club based in Tottenham, London, England.

== History ==
NW London were formed in 2015 by Wasim Khan and Samir Naji from Cricklewood and Kilburn respectively. The club joined the Middlesex County League system in 2017. NW London entered the FA Vase for the first time in 2019–20. The 2021–2022 season was a treble winning season in which the club captured the Middlesex Premier Division along with two cup competitions (Anagram Records Trophy & Middlesex Intermediate Cup).

== Ground ==
The club currently groundshare with Haringey Borough F.C. as of summer 2024.

== Records ==
- Best FA Vase performance: Second qualifying round, 2023–24, 2025–26
