= Heacham F.C. =

Coordinates: 52°54′40.46″N 0°29′26.64″E

Heacham
- Full name: Heacham Football Club
- Nickname: The Magpies
- Founded: 1907
- Ground: Station Road, Heacham
- Chairman: Sam Pishorn
- Manager: Mark Hunter
- League: Eastern Counties League Premier Division
- 2025–26: Eastern Counties League Premier Division, 15th of 18
Home colours	Away colours

Heacham Football Club is a football club based in Heacham, England. They are currently members of the Eastern Counties League Premier Division and play at Station Road, Heacham.

== History ==
Heacham were formed in 1907. In 2022, following a seventh consecutive promotion, the club was admitted into the Eastern Counties League Division One North.

== Staff ==
Chairman: Sam Pishorn

Manager: Mark Hunter

Assistant Manager: Andrew Woods

Kit Manager: Tom Childerhouse

== Ground ==
The club currently play at Station Road, Heacham.
