= Marcelona F.C. =

Association football club in England

Coordinates: 51°35′6.979″N 0°5′21.862″E

Marcelona
- Full name: Marcelona Football Club
- Founded: 2003
- Ground: Leslie Fields, Burnham-on-Crouch
- Chairman: Sam Collington
- Manager: Marce Collington
- League: Eastern Counties League Division One South
- 2025–26: Eastern Counties League Division One South, 6th of 21
Home colours	Away colours

Marcelona Football Club is a football club based in England. They are currently members of the Eastern Counties League Division One South and play at Leslie Fields in Burnham-on-Crouch, where they ground-share with Burnham Ramblers.

== History ==
The club were founded in 2003 as Newbury Forest, initially competing as a Sunday league side. After adding three adult teams and youth teams down to under-10s, the club moved into the English football league system when they joined the Romford and District League in 2008. After winning the senior division in 2010, they progressed to the Essex and Suffolk Border Football League, where they finished third in the Premier Division in 2012. They then moved to the Essex Olympian Football League Division One and were promoted to the Premier Division after finishing third in 2013. The club applied to join the new Division One South of the Eastern Counties League for the 2018–19 season, and their application was successful.

The club entered the FA Vase for the first time in 2015.

In June 2026, the club rebranded as Marcelona as part of a wider strategic repositioning.

== Ground ==
The club previously played at Oakside Stadium, groundsharing with Redbridge. In June 2026, they moved to Leslie Fields in Burnham-on-Crouch under a new groundshare agreement with Burnham Ramblers.

== Honours ==
- Essex Saturday Premier Cup
  - Winners 2012, 2014
- Romford & District League Senior Division:
  - Winners 2009–10

== Records ==
- Highest League Position: 4th in Essex Olympian League Premier Division 2014–15
- FA Vase best performance: First round proper 2018–19, 2024–25
