= Coggeshall United F.C. =

Association football club in England

Coordinates: 51.868605°N 0.67211330°E

Coggeshall United
- Full name: Coggeshall United Football Club
- Nickname(s): The Weavers
- Founded: 2017
- Dissolved: 2023
- Ground: West Street, Coggeshall
Home colours

Coggeshall United Football Club was a football club based in Coggeshall, Essex. They were founded in 2017 by former footballer Cliff Akurang.

== History ==
The club was founded in 2017 and joined the Premier Division of the Essex & Suffolk Border League, with Cliff Akurang being appointed player-manager. Akurang also became club chairman later in the season. They finished second in the league in their first season, and successfully applied to join the new Division One South of the Eastern Counties League. In 2018, Andrew Douglas took over as Club President. In the 2018–19 season, they finished 2nd in Division One South of the Eastern Counties League, narrowly missing out on promotion to Hashtag United.

In 2023, Coggeshall United finished bottom of the Eastern Counties League Division One South. The following season, the club failed to enter a league.

== Records ==
- Highest league position: 2nd in Eastern Counties League Division One South 2018–19

== Ground ==
Coggeshall United played at Coggeshall Town's West Street ground, which is located to the west of Coggeshall.
