= Mulbarton Wanderers F.C. =

Association football club in England

Coordinates: 52.5620°N 1.2384°E

Mulbarton Wanderers
- Full name: Mulbarton Wanderers Football Club
- Founded: 1993
- Ground: Mulberry Park
- Chair: Graham Bunting
- Managers: Ben Thompson & Danny Self
- League: Isthmian League North Division
- 2025–26: Eastern Counties League Premier Division, 1st of 18 (promoted)
Home colours	Away colours

Mulbarton Wanderers Football Club is a football club based in Mulbarton, Norfolk. The men's first team are currently members in the Isthmian League North Division and play at Mulberry Park.

== History ==
The football club was established in 1993 when the youth team of Mulbarton United, a now-defunct Anglian Combination side, broke away to form their own youth team. They merged with the Harford Belles girls team in 2001 and established in the Central and South Norfolk League, a men's senior team, in Division Four. The club won promotion in their first season, continued to rise through the league, and beginning in the 2007–08 season reached Division One. They were promoted to the Anglian Combination Division Six in 2009, and achieved six successive promotions, reaching the Premier Division in 2015. After finishing second in 2018, the club successfully applied to join the Eastern Counties Football League, entering in Division One North for 2018–19.

Their debut season in the Eastern Counties League saw the club compete in the FA Vase for the first time, and in the following season saw the club enter the FA Cup for the first time, losing to Boston Town in the extra preliminary round. In 2021 the club were promoted to the Premier Division based on their results in the abandoned 2019–20 and 2020–21 seasons. The 2025–26 season saw the club promoted to step 4 for the first time as Premier Division champions, also winning the League Challenge Cup final and the Norfolk Senior Cup.

== Other teams ==
In addition to the men's first team, the club is home to two women's teams (playing in the Eastern Region Women's Football League and Norfolk Women and Girls Football League), a men's reserve team playing in the Anglian Combination, 2x under-18 teams playing in the Thurlow Nunn Youth League and 27 junior teams (2 in the Eastern Junior Alliance, 19 in the Norfolk Combined Youth Football League and 6 in the Norfolk Women and Girls Football League). It also runs a PAN disability comets team, a Wildcats programme and U5 and U6 programmes.

== Ground ==
Adult teams plays at Mulberry Park. The ground has two stands, the Ken Lewis Stand and the Pip Skips stands, which each have sixty seats.

Junior teams play at Orchard Park, next to Mulberry Park, and the Hewett Academy.

== Honours ==
- Eastern Counties Football League
  - Premier Division champions 2025–26
  - League Challenge Cup winners 2025–26
- Anglian Combination
  - Division One champions 2014–15
  - Division Four champions 2011–12
  - Division Five champions 2010–11
- Mummery Cup
  - Winners 2016–17
- Cyril Ballyn Cup
  - Winners 2012–13
- Norfolk Senior Cup
  - Winners 2021–22

== Records ==
- Highest league position: 1st in Eastern Counties League Premier Division, 2025–26
- Best FA Cup performance: Third Qualifying Round, 2026–27
- Best FA Vase performance: Fifth round, 2020–21
- Best Norfolk Senior Cup performance: Winners, 2021–22, 2025–26
- Record attendance: 1,002 vs Gloucester City, FA Cup third qualifying round, 3 October 2026
