= FC Baresi =

Coordinates: 51°49′29.24″N 0°1′59.82″W

- Full name: Football Club Baresi
- Founded: 1997; 29 years ago
- Ground: Wodson Park
- Capacity: 3,300
- Chairman: Amjad Mahmood
- Manager: Yannick Kamanan
- League: Eastern Counties League Division One South
- 2024–25: Eastern Counties League Division One South, 14th of 20
Home colours

Football Club Baresi is a football club based in London, England. They are currently members of the Eastern Counties League Division One South and play at Wodson Park, Ware, groundsharing with Ware.

== History ==
FC Baresi were founded in 1997. In 2006, the club joined the Middlesex County League, winning Division Three East in their first season in the league. In 2017, FC Baresi joined the Essex Alliance League. In 2024, the club was admitted into the Eastern Counties League Division One South, after winning the Essex Alliance League.

== Ground ==
FC Baresi currently groundshare with Ware at Wodson Park, after previously playing at Britannia Sports Ground and the George White Ground, both in Walthamstow.

== Records ==
- FA Vase
  - First Qualifying Round 2024–25
