= AFC Pegasus =

Coordinates: 51°52′53.33″N 0°50′27.74″E

- Full name: AFC Pegasus
- Nickname: Pego
- Founded: 2018; 8 years ago
- Ground: Coggeshall Town F.C.
- Chairman: Chris Powell
- Manager: Vacant
- League: Eastern Counties League Division One North
- 2025–26: Eastern Counties League Premier Division, 6th of 18
Home colours

AFC Pegasus is a football club based in Stanway, England. The club was formerly known as Stanway Pegasus Football Club before returning to the name AFC Pegasus in June 2026. They are currently members of the Eastern Counties League Division One North and play at Coggeshall Town F.C..

== History ==
Formed in 2018 as Stanway Pegasus, the club traced its roots to the long-established Colchester Sunday league side AFC Pegasus. The club entered the Essex and Suffolk Border League Division Two upon formation. In 2022, after winning the Essex & Suffolk Border League, the club was admitted into the Eastern Counties League Division One South.

In June 2026, the club announced that it would return to its original name, AFC Pegasus.

== Records ==
- Best FA Vase performance: Fourth round, 2023–24
