= Basildon Town F.C. =

Coordinates: 51°31′20.33″N 0°27′41.62″E

Basildon Town
- Full name: Basildon Town Football Club
- Founded: 1946; 80 years ago
- Ground: The Hive, Gardiners Close Basildon
- Capacity: 3,500 (160 seated)
- Chairman: Andy Cumming
- Manager: Matthew Knight
- League: Eastern Counties League Division One South
- 2024–25: Eastern Counties League Division One South, 9th of 20
Home colours

Basildon Town Football Club is a football club based in Basildon, England. They are currently members of the Eastern Counties League Division One South and recently for the 2024/25 season moved back to playing at play The Hive, Gardiners Close Basildon.

== History ==
Formed as South Basildon & Vange in 1946, the club entered the Grays & District Minor League in 1947, renaming themselves to Basildon Town a year later whilst in the Southend & District League. In 1953, following stints in the Thurrock Combination and South Essex League, Basildon Town joined the Parthenon League, joining the London League in 1955. In 1964, the club merged with Pitsea United to form Basildon & Pitsea, becoming founder members of the Essex Olympian League in 1966. Two years later, the club reconstituted back to Basildon Town. During the 1970s, Basildon Town played in the Basildon & District League and Southend & District League, before rejoining the Essex Olympian League in 1981.

In 2022, after winning the Essex Olympian League, the club was admitted into the Eastern Counties League Division One South.

In the 2022/23 season Basildon Town finished Runners-Ups and missed out on promotion to the Essex Senior League by 1 point. Subsequently losing in the Play-Offs. For the 2023/24 season Basildon Town finished mid table in 12th place.

== Ground ==
Upon formation, the club played at Stacey's Corner in Basildon. In 1959, Basildon Town moved to Burnt Mills Road in the town, later moving to Gun Meadow in Pitsea in 1964. In 1972, the club returned to Basildon, playing at Eversley Road. In 1985, the club moved to the Basildon Sports & Leisure Club.

In 2021, Basildon Town began groundsharing with Basildon United at their ground in Gardiners Close, with the Senior Reserves, A Team & main of the clubs youth sides remaining at the Basildon Sports & Leisure Club. In 2022, it was announced the club would enter a groundsharing agreement with East Thurrock United at Rookery Hill. They returned to Basildon United ahead of the 2024–25 season.

== Records ==
- Best FA Vase performance: First round, 2022–23
