= Essex and Suffolk Border Football League =

Association football league in England

- Founded: 1911
- Country: England
- Divisions: Premier Division; Division One; Division Two; Division Three North; Division Three South; Division Four North; Division Four South
- Number of clubs: 100; 17 (Premier Division); 16 (Division One); 14 (Division Two); 15 (Division Three North); 13 (Division Three South); 15 (Division Four North); 15 (Division Four South)
- Level on pyramid: Level 11 (Premier Division)
- Feeder to: Eastern Counties League
- Promotion to: Eastern Counties League Division One North/South
- League cup(s): Knock Out Cup; Linda Degville Cup; Peter Andrews Charity Cup; Reserve/"A" Cup; Richard Degville Cup; Tommy Thompson Cup
- Current champions: Great Bentley (Premier Division); Gosfield United (Division One); Bradfield Rovers (Division Two); Tiptree Jobserve (Division Three); Frinton & Walton Reserves (Division Four) (2026–27)
- Website: esblfootball.com

The Essex and Suffolk Border Football League is a football competition in England. The league has a total of four divisions headed by the Premier Division which sits at step 7 (or level 11) of the National League System. The top club may apply for promotion to Division One of the Eastern Counties League.

All member clubs compete in the Border League Knock-Out Cup. The league is affiliated to the Essex County FA and Suffolk County FA.

== History ==
The league was officially founded in 1911, although the league includes records of the Colchester Borough League (founded 1893) and Colchester & District League (founded 1903) in its history. Founder members of the Border League in the inaugural 1911–12 season included Clacton Town, Colchester Town, West Bergholt and West Mersea.

Over the last 100 years the league has seen many changes in its status with many clubs progressing to a higher level. The overlying trend has been the migration of the larger clubs and their replacement by smaller clubs with more basic facilities. For much of the last 20 years the Border League has run 4 divisions which included a significant proportion of reserve teams. The league lost several members in 2005–06 when the reserve teams of the Eastern Counties League clubs left for their own competition. There is a high representation of village teams but a new trend has emerged with the acceptance of Barnston from Division Three of the Essex Olympian League and Newbury Forest from the Romford and District Football League in the London Borough of Redbridge.

In June 2026, the Mid-Essex Football League merged with the Essex & Suffolk Border League, with clubs from the former league entering the Border League structure for the 2026/27 season.

== Member clubs 2026–27 ==
The league has 94 teams spread over seven divisions for the 2026–27 season:

Premier Division
- AFC Pegasus Colchester Reserves
- Alresford Colne Rangers
- Clacton Regent
- Cressing United
- Dedham Old Boys
- Earls Colne
- Gas Recreation
- Gosfield United
- Great Bentley
- Hatfield Peverel
- Springfield
- Stanway Rovers Reserves
- Sudbury Sports
- The Rodings & Waltham
- Thorpe Athletic
- Tiptree Heath
- White Notley
Division One
- Birchanger Athletic
- Bradfield Rovers
- Cavendish
- Dovercourt Rovers
- Gas Recreation Reserves
- Great Bentley Reserves
- Hatfield Peverel Reserves
- Hedinghams United
- AFC Prettygate
- Roman Rovers
- Silver End United
- Springfield Reserves
- Tavern
- Wivenhoe Town Reserves
Division Two
- Alresford Colne Rangers Reserves
- Boxford Rovers
- Colchester Tekkers Community
- Cressing United Reserves
- Emerson & Upminster
- Frinton & Walton
- Harwich & Parkeston A
- Lawford Lads
- Mayland Village
- Springfield U23s
- Stillwaters
- Sudbury Sports Reserves
- Tiptree Jobserve
- West Bergholt
Division Three North
- Boxted Lodgers
- Bradfield Rovers Reserves
- Colchester Rangers
- Elmstead Market
- Essex Students
- Mersea Island
- Oyster
- AFC Prettygate Reserves
- Roman Rovers Reserves
- Silver End United Reserves
- White Notley Reserves
- Wivenhoe United
- Wormingford Wanderers
Division Three South
- Baddow Athletic
- Beaulieu Park
- Emerson & Upminster Reserves
- Essex Royals
- Eversley Athletic
- Great Baddow
- Great Bradfords
- Hedinghams United Reserves
- Rayne
- Springfield Development
- Stock United
- Witham Town Reserves
Division Four North
- Brooklands
- Dedham Old Boys Reserves
- Elmstead Market Reserves
- Kelvedon Social
- Ramsey & Mistley
- Rayne Reserves
- Stanway Rovers A
- Tendring Borough
- Tendring Rovers
- Tiptree Jobserve Reserves
- Tollesbury
- Weeley
- West Bergholt Reserves
Division Four South
- Baddow Spartak
- Beacon Hill Rovers Reserves
- Broomfield A
- Great Baddow Reserves
- Ingrave Park Royals
- MATES
- South Cestos
- Southminster United A
- Wilvale Rangers
- Witham Town A
- Writtle

== Former clubs ==
Among the clubs that have left the Essex & Suffolk Border Football League to compete at a higher level are:

- Brantham Athletic
- Brightlingsea Regent
- Bury Town
- Clacton Town
- Coggeshall Town
- Coggeshall United
- Colchester Town
- Cornard United
- Crittall Athletic
- Dunmow Town
- East Thurrock Community
- Felixstowe Town
- Haverhill Borough
- Haverhill Rovers
- Halstead Town
- Harwich & Parkeston
- Heybridge Swifts
- Holland
- Kings Park Rangers
- Little Oakley
- Long Melford
- Maldon Town
- Saffron Walden Town
- Stanway Pegasus
- Stanway Rovers
- Stowmarket Town
- Sudbury Town
- Sudbury Wanderers
- Team Bury
- Tiptree United
- Whitton United
- Witham Town
- Wivenhoe Town

== List of champions ==
Season	Senior Division
1893–94	St Peter's Institute

Season	Senior Division	Division II (Junior)
1894–95	Colchester Town	Colchester United
1895–96		Colchester United
1896–97		Colchester Casuals
1897–98		Colchester Albions
1898–99	Royal Irish Fusiliers	Colchester Albions
1899–1900		New Town Athletic
1900–01	Colchester Crown	New Town Athletic
1901–02	Colchester Crown	St Leonards
1902–03	Colchester Crown	Colchester Rovers
1903–04	2nd Bn. Bedfordshire Regiment	Manningtree United
1904–05	2nd Bn. Norfolk Regiment	Albion Rovers
1905–06	2nd Bn. K.O.S.B.	Albion Rovers
1906–07	4th K.R.R.C.	Colchester Athletic
1907–08	Colchester Town	Colchester Excelsiors

Season	Senior Division	Division II (Junior)	Division II (Section B)
1908–09	Harwich & Parkeston	Colchester Athletic	Brightlingsea Town
1909–10	2nd Bn. Scottish Rifles	Clacton Town	Coggeshall
1910–11	2nd Bn. Scottish Rifles	Colchester Athletic	Coggeshall
1911–12	1st Bn. East Lancs Regiment	1st Bn. East Lancs Regiment Reserves	Colchester St Nicholas
1912–13	Colchester Town	Maldon Town	1st Bn. East Lancs III
1913–14	Harwich & Parkeston	1st Bn. Hampshire Reserves	Colchester Junior Athletic

Season	Senior Division	Division II (Junior)	Division II (Section B)	Division II (Western)
1919–20			Wivenhoe Town	Haverhill Rovers
1920–21	Harwich & Parkeston	Colchester St Nicholas	Wivenhoe Town	Heybridge
1921–22	Harwich & Parkeston	Paxmans Athletic	Brightlingsea	Maldon St Mary's
1922–23	Harwich & Parkeston	Severalls Athletic	Wivenhoe Town	Crittall Athletic
1923–24	Colchester Town	2nd Bn. Royal Scots Reserves	Colchester Juniors	Crittall Athletic
1924–25	2nd Bn. Royal Scots	2nd Bn. Royal Scots Reserves	Frinton Town	11th Field Brigade R.A.

Season	Senior Division	Division II (Junior)	Division II (Section B)
1925–26	2nd Bn. Leicestershire Regiment	11th Field Brigade R.A.	Wimpole Road Wesleyans
1926–27	2nd. Bn. Rifle Brigade	Severalls Athletic	Colchester Town 'A'
1927–28	2nd. Bn. Rifle Brigade	Wimpole Road Wesleyans	Stanway Rovers

Season	Senior Division	Division I (Junior)	Division II (Junior)	Division III
1928–29	Harwich & Parkeston	4th Div. Royal Corps Signals	Great Bentley	Clacton Athletic

Season	Senior Division	Division I (Junior)	Division II (Junior)
1929–30	2nd. Bn. Rifle Brigade	4th Div. Royal Corps Signals	Paxmans Athletic
1930–31	4th Div. Royal Corps Signals	Heybridge	Clacton Rovers
1931–32	Harwich & Parkeston	–	Great Bentley

Season	Senior Division	Division I (Junior)	Division II (Junior)	Division III
1932–33	Harwich & Parkeston	2nd Bn. K.S.L.I.	Parkside Rangers	1st Colchester Scouts
1933–34	Harwich & Parkeston	–	2nd Bn. K.S.L.I. Reserves	Colchester Old Scouts
1934–35	1st Bn. Lancashire Fusiliers	–	Clacton Athletic	5th Inniskilling D.G. Reserves
1935–36	Critall Athletic	–	Walton Town	Frinton Juniors
1936–37	Critall Athletic	–	Great Bentley	9th Company R.A.M.C.
1937–38	Critall Athletic	–	Parkeston Railway	7th Field Company R.E.

Season	Senior Division	Division I (Junior)	Division II (Junior)
1938–39	Hoffman Athletic	Butlin's Athletic	9 Company R.A.M.C

Season	Premier Division	Division One
1946–47	Colchester Casuals	Brightlingsea United
1947–48	Haverhill Rovers	Great Bentley
1948–49	Sudbury Town	Clacton Hotspurs
1949–50	Sudbury Town	Halstead Town 'A'
1950–51	Stowmarket Town	M.C.E.
1951–52	Sudbury Town	Halstead Town Reserves
1952–53	Sudbury Town	Stowmarket Town Reserves
1953–54	Sudbury Town	Clacton Hotspurs
1954–55	Long Melford	Clacton Hotspurs
1955–56	Long Melford	Clacton Hotspurs
1956–57	Long Melford	Parkeston Railway
1957–58	Halstead Town	Woods Athletic
1958–59	Long Melford	Clacton Hotspurs
1959–60	Critalls Athletic	Halstead Town Reserves
1960–61	Long Melford	Brightlingsea United
1961–62	Marconi Athletic	Lexden Wanderers
1962–63	Haverhill Rovers	Coggeshall Town
1963–64	Haverhill Rovers	Haverhill Rovers Reserves
1964–65	Witham Town	Lexden Wanderers

Season	Premier Division	Division One East	Division One West
1965–66	Maldon Town	Clacton North End	Witham Town Reserves
1966–67	Coggeshall Town	Rowhedge	Sudbury Wanderers

Season	Premier Division	Division One	Division Two
1967–68	Coggeshall Town	Silver End	Tiptree United Reserves
1968–69	Halstead Town	Eastern Gas	Parkeston Railway
1969–70	Coggeshall Town	Sudbury Town Reserves	Eastern Gas Reserves
1970–71	Witham Town	Lexden Wanderers	West End United
1971–72	Eastern Gas	Parkeston Railway	Wivenhoe Rangers

Season	Premier Division	Division One
1972–73	Brantham Athletic	Wivenhoe Rangers
1973–74	Brantham Athletic	Mersea Island
1974–75	West End United	Shalford Rovers
1975–76	Brantham Athletic	Harwich & Parkeston Reserves
1976–77	Brantham Athletic	Sudbury Wanderers

Season	Premier Division	Division One	Division Two
1977–78	Halstead Town	Felixstowe Town Reserves	Clacton Town Reserves

Season	Premier Division	Division One	Division Two	Division Three
1978–79	Wivenhoe Town	Shalford Rovers	Wivenhoe Town Reserves	Earls Colne
1979–80	Mersea Island	West End United	Earls Colne	Tiptree United Reserves
1980–81	Sudbury Town Reserves	Rowhedge	West Bergholt	Bramston-Crittall Reserves
1981–82	Harwich & Parkeston Reserves	Tiptree United Reserves	Stanway Rovers	Donyland Swifts
1982–83	Earls Colne	Haverhill Rovers Reserves	Colchester United 'A'	Boxted Lodgers
1983–84	Tiptree United Reserves	Bramston CML	Haverhill Meat Products	Dedham Old Boys
1984–85	Braintree Town Reserves	Long Melford	Donyland Swifts	Royal London
1985–86	Hatfield Peverel	Little Oakley	Stanway Rovers	Stanway Rovers Reserves
1986–87	Little Oakley	Stanway Rovers	Long Melford Reserves	Alresford Colne Rangers
1987–88	Little Oakley	Mistley United	Gas Recreation	West Bergholt Reserves
1988–89	Cornard United	Alresford Colne Rangers	Royal London	Kelvedon Social
1989–90	Sudbury Wanderers	Felixstowe Town Reserves	Kelvedon Social	Cavendish
1990–91	Sudbury Wanderers	Alresford Colne Rangers	Rowhedge	Tiptree Heath
1991–92	Harwich & Parkeston Reserves	Kelvedon Social	Tiptree Heath	Foxash Social
1992–93	Little Oakley	Mersea Island	Foxash Social	Hedinghams United
1993–94	Little Oakley	Halstead Town Reserves	Lawford Lads	Finchingfield Rovers
1994–95	Halstead Town Reserves	West Bergholt Reserves	Earls Colne	Coggeshall Town
1995–96	Gas Recreation	Clacton Town Reserves	Silver End	Kirby United
1996–97	Gas Recreation	Ipswich Wanderers Reserves	Cavendish	Brightlingsea United Reserves
1997–98	Gas Recreation	St Osyth	Kelvedon Social Reserves	Tiptree Heath
1998–99	Gas Recreation	St Osyth	Needham Market Reserves	Wivenhoe Town Reserves
1999–00	AFC Sudbury Reserves	Clacton Town Reserves	Tiptree Heath	Birch United
2000–01	West Bergholt	Weeley Athletic	Wivenhoe Town Reserves	Bury Town Reserves
2001–02	AFC Sudbury Reserves	Stanway Rovers Reserves	Whitton United Reserves	Weeley Athletic Reserves
2002–03	Rowhedge	Alresford Colne Rangers	Bury Town Reserves	Bradfield Rovers
2003–04	Little Oakley	Bury Town Reserves	Hatfield Peverel	Witham Town Reserves
2004–05	Gas Recreation	Hatfield Peverel	Witham Town Reserves	Gosfield United

Season	Premier Division	Division One	Division Two
2005–06	Gas Recreation	Witham Town Reserves	Brightlingsea Regent
2006–07	Gas Recreation	West Suffolk College	Great Bradfords

Season	Premier Division	Division One
2007–08	Gas Recreation	White Notley
2008–09	West Bergholt	Holland
2009–10	Gas Recreation	Wormingford Wanderers
2010–11	Brightlingsea Regent	Lawford Lads
2011–12	West Bergholt	Haverhill Sports Association
2012–13	Gas Recreation	Tollesbury

Season	Premier Division	Division One	Division Two	Division Three
2013–14	Gas Recreation	Alresford Cone Rangers Reserves	Gas Recreation Reserves	Team Brantham

Season	Premier Division	Division One	Division Two
2014–15	West Bergholt	Hatfield Peverel	Cinque Port
2015–16	Coggeshall Town	Wormingford Wanderers	Cressing United

Season	Premier Division	Division One	Division Two	Division Three
2016–17	Little Oakley	Dedham Old Boys	Great Bentley	Flitch United
2017–18	Gas Recreation	Great Bentley	Tiptree Heath	Colne Athletic
2018–19	Gas Recreation	Flitch United	Stanway Pegasus	Gosfield United

Season	Premier Division	Division One	Division Two	Division Three
2019–20	Season abandoned due to COVID-19 pandemic			

Season	Premier Division	Division One	Division Two	Division Three	Division Four
2020–21	Season abandoned due to COVID-19 pandemic				

Season	Premier Division	Division One	Division Two	Division Three	Division Four	Division Five
2021–22	Stanway Pegasus	Stanway Rovers under-23's	Brightlingsea Town	Wormingford Wanderers	Gas Recreation Reserves	Roman Rovers
2022–23	Dunmow Town	Silver End United	Dovercourt Rovers	Gas Recreation	High Roding	Gas Recreation Reserves
2023–24	Colne Athletic	Thorpe Athletic	Gas Recreation	Gosfield United	The Rodings Reserves	Assington Stanley

Season	Premier Division	Division One	Division Two	Division Three	Division Four
2024–25	Kings Park Rangers	Great Bentley	Tavern	Hatfield Peverel Reserves	Silver End United Reserves
2025–26	Great Bentley	Gosfield United	Bradfield Rovers	Tiptree Jobserve	Frinton & Walton Reserves
Source: Essex & Suffolk Border League

== Gallery ==
Essex and Suffolk Border League grounds
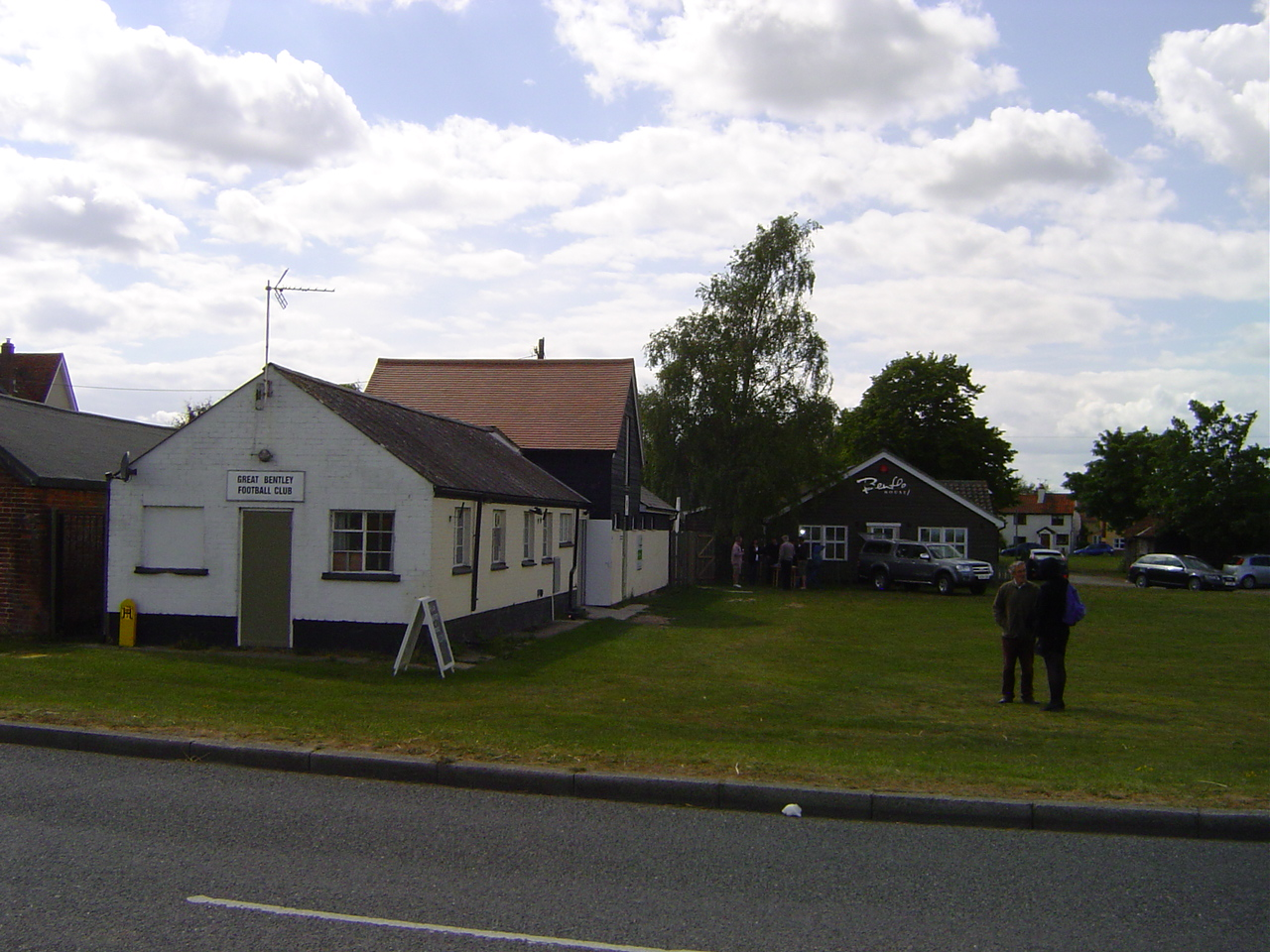
Forge Lane, Great Bentley

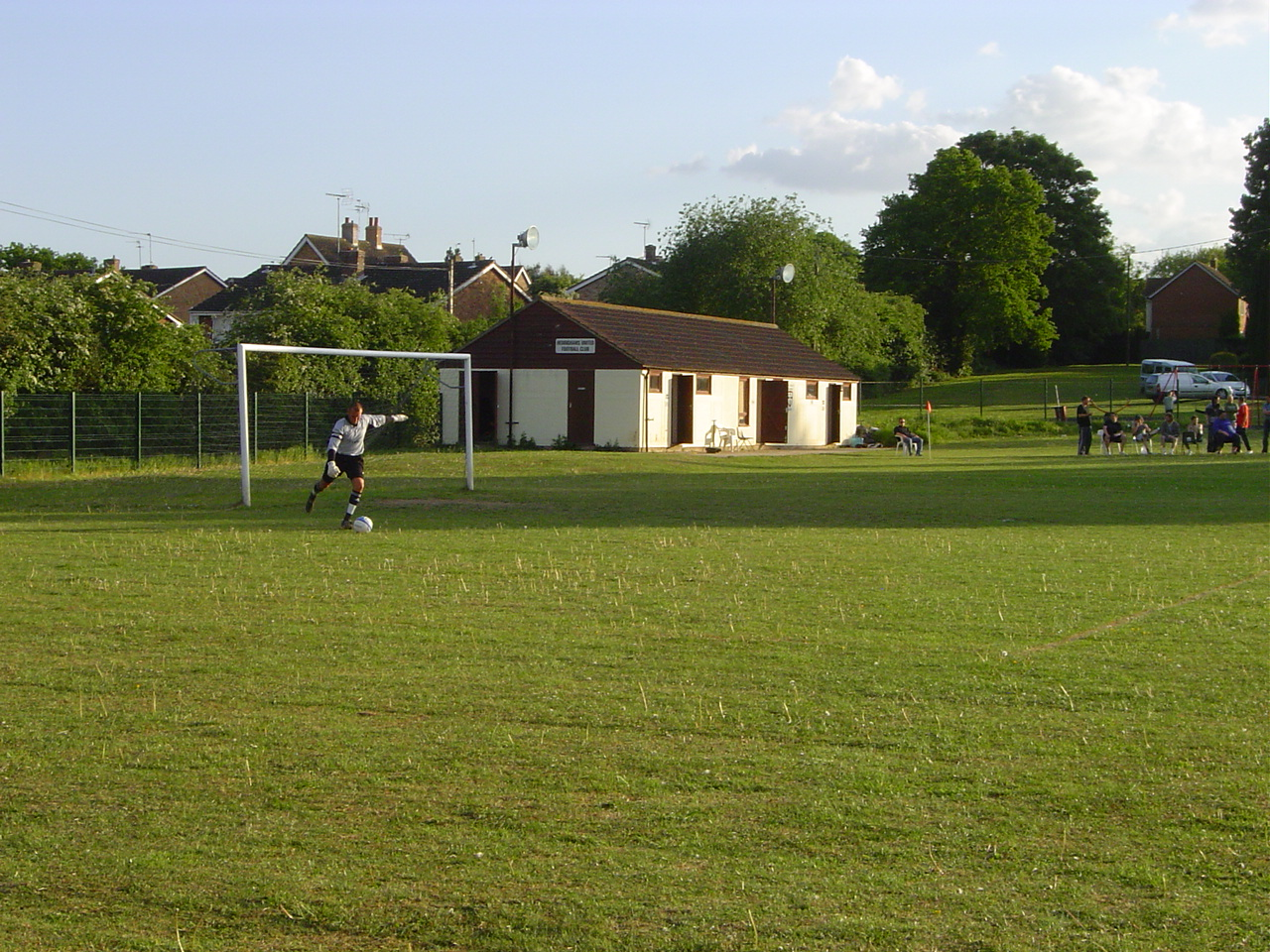
Lawn Meadow, Hedinghams United

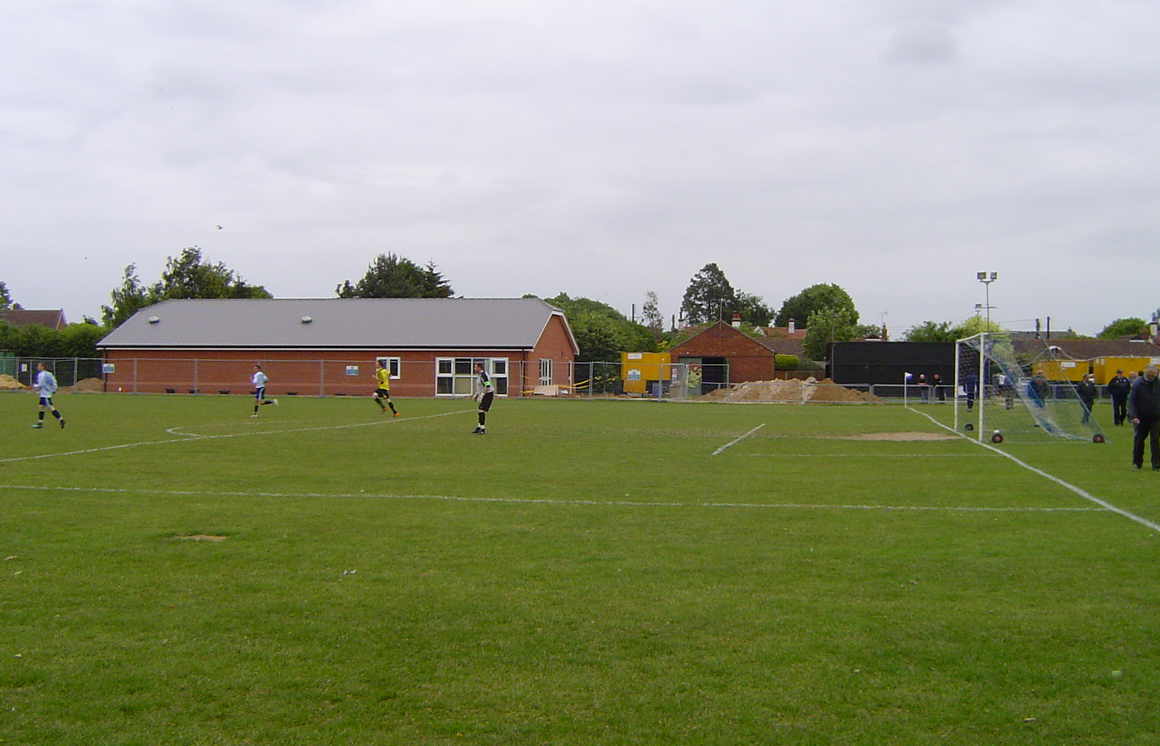
School Lane, Lawford Lads
