= 2026–27 Eastern Counties Football League =

Association football competition

The 2026–27 Eastern Counties Football League is the 84th season of the Eastern Counties Football League, a football competition in England. Teams are divided into three divisions, the Premier Division at Step 5, and the geographically separated Division One North and Division One South (Eastern Senior League), both at Step 6 of the English football league system. The constitution was announced on 14 May 2026.

== Premier Division ==
Eastern Counties Football League Premier Division
- Season: 2026–27

The Premier Division featured 15 teams from the previous season.

Five clubs joined the division:

- Brantham Athletic, relegated from the Isthmian League
- Downham Town, relegated from the Isthmian League
- March Town United, transferred from the United Counties League
- Mildenhall Town, relegated from the Isthmian League
- Wisbech Town, transferred from the United Counties League

Three clubs left the division:

- Fakenham Town, promoted to the Isthmian League
- Hadleigh United, relegated to Division One North
- Mulbarton Wanderers, promoted to the Isthmian League

=== Premier Division table ===
Pos	Team	Pld	W	D	L	GF	GA	GD	Pts	Promotion, qualification or relegation
1	March Town United	19	13	5	1	48	18	+30	44	Promotion to the Isthmian League
2	Thetford Town	18	11	5	2	48	22	+26	38	Qualification for the play-offs
3	Ely City	17	11	3	3	44	26	+18	36	Qualification for the play-offs
4	Dereham Town	19	10	3	6	42	33	+9	33	Qualification for the play-offs
5	Downham Town	19	9	6	4	35	29	+6	33	Qualification for the play-offs
6	Stowmarket Town	19	10	2	7	37	33	+4	32	
7	Walsham-le-Willows	18	9	2	7	35	30	+5	29	
8	Ipswich Wanderers	17	8	4	5	34	23	+11	28	
9	Great Yarmouth Town	17	7	7	3	36	33	+3	28	
10	Haverhill Rovers	17	8	3	6	32	27	+5	27	
11	Soham Town Rangers	19	8	3	8	37	33	+4	27	
12	Harleston Town	15	7	4	4	30	19	+11	25	
13	Brantham Athletic	17	7	3	7	33	26	+7	24	
14	Wisbech Town	17	6	5	6	23	24	−1	23	
15	Woodbridge Town	17	6	3	8	26	29	−3	21	
16	Mildenhall Town	18	4	4	10	30	37	−7	16	
17	Lakenheath	19	4	4	11	28	42	−14	16	
18	Kirkley & Pakefield	18	3	2	13	21	45	−24	11	
19	Cornard United	17	0	4	13	17	49	−32	4	Relegation to Division One North
20	Heacham	19	1	0	18	8	66	−58	3	Relegation to Division One North

Updated to match(es) played on 21 November 2026. Source: The FA Full-Time
Rules for classification: 1) Points; 2) Goal difference; 3) Number of goals scored; 4) Number of matches won; 5) Head-to-head results

=== Results table ===
Home \ Away	BRA	COR	DER	DOW	ELY	GYT	HAR	HVR	HEA	IPS	K&P	LAK	MTU	MIL	STR	STW	THE	WLW	WIS	WOO
Brantham Athletic	—	4–0											0–1							
Cornard United		—		1–1																
Dereham Town			—						1–0											3–2
Downham Town				—																
Ely City					—					2–3										
Great Yarmouth Town			3–3			—								3–3						
Harleston Town							—		6–1							1–2				
Haverhill Rovers			3–3					—												
Heacham				1–4					—						1–5					
Ipswich Wanderers	1–1									—		3–1								
Kirkley & Pakefield		2–2									—									
Lakenheath						0–2						—						2–4		
March Town United							2–0						—							
Mildenhall Town								4–1						—				0–1		
Soham Town Rangers													0–3		—	2–1				
Stowmarket Town																—			3–2	
Thetford Town																	—			
Walsham-le-Willows											3–0							—		
Wisbech Town					0–2												0–2		—	
Woodbridge Town				0–2							2–1									—

Updated to match(es) played on 4 August 2026. Source: The FA Full-Time
Legend: Blue = home team win; Yellow = draw; Red = away team win.
For upcoming matches, an "a" indicates there is an article about the rivalry between the two participants.

=== Stadia and locations ===
Locations of the Premier Division clubs

Team	Location	Stadium	Capacity
Brantham Athletic	Brantham	Brantham Leisure Centre	1,200
Cornard United	Sudbury (Little Cornard)	Blackhouse Lane	2,000
Dereham Town	Dereham	Aldiss Park	3,000
Downham Town	Downham Market	Memorial Field	1,000
Ely City	Ely	Unwin Sports Ground	1,500
Great Yarmouth Town	Great Yarmouth	Wellesley Recreation Ground	3,600
Harleston Town	Harleston	Wilderness Lane	1,500
Haverhill Rovers	Haverhill	New Croft	3,000
Heacham	Heacham	Station Road	1,500
Ipswich Wanderers	Ipswich	Humber Doucy Lane	550
Kirkley & Pakefield	Lowestoft	Walmer Road	2,000
Lakenheath	Lakenheath	The Nest	1,500
March Town United	March	GER Sports Ground	1,000
Mildenhall Town	Mildenhall	Recreation Way	2,000
Soham Town Rangers	Soham	Julius Martin Lane	2,000
Stowmarket Town	Stowmarket	Greens Meadow	1,000
Thetford Town	Thetford	Mundford Road	1,500
Walsham-le-Willows	Walsham le Willows	Summer Road	1,000
Wisbech Town	Wisbech	Fenland Stadium	1,118
Woodbridge Town	Martlesham	Notcutts Park	3,000

== Division One North ==
Eastern Counties Football League Division One North
- Season: 2026–27

Division One North featured 16 clubs which competed in the previous season.

Four clubs joined the division:

- Hadleigh United, relegated from the Premier Division
- Netherton United, promoted from the Peterborough & District League
- Newmarket Town reserves, promoted from the Cambridgeshire County League
- Norwich United, promoted from the Anglian Combination

Four clubs left the division:

- FC Peterborough, promoted to the United Counties League
- Haverhill Borough, resigned from the league.
- Kings Park Rangers, folded at the end of the season.
- Leiston under 23s, relegated to the Suffolk & Ipswich League

Additionally, Stanway Pegasus was renamed to AFC Pegasus and FC Clacton was renamed to Clacton Town.

=== League table ===
Pos	Team	Pld	W	D	L	GF	GA	GD	Pts	Promotion, qualification or relegation
1	Holland	18	15	2	1	69	25	+44	47	Promotion to the Premier Division
2	Norwich United	18	11	5	2	37	17	+20	38	Qualification for the play-offs
3	Wivenhoe Town	17	12	0	5	54	22	+32	36	Qualification for the play-offs
4	Clacton Town	17	11	2	4	48	28	+20	35	Qualification for the play-offs
5	Halesworth Town	19	11	1	7	51	34	+17	34	Qualification for the play-offs
6	Netherton United	20	10	3	7	50	32	+18	33	
7	AFC Pegasus	18	9	4	5	40	24	+16	31	
8	Framlingham Town	20	8	3	9	38	40	−2	27	
9	Wroxham reserves	18	8	2	8	32	37	−5	26	
10	Long Melford	15	7	4	4	30	23	+7	25	
11	Whittlesey Athletic	21	7	3	11	32	42	−10	24	
12	Holbeach United	18	7	3	8	27	38	−11	24	
13	FC Parson Drove	19	7	3	9	33	47	−14	24	
14	Newmarket Town reserves	18	6	4	8	21	38	−17	22	
15	Gorleston reserves	18	6	3	9	35	34	+1	21	
16	Diss Town	18	6	3	9	23	36	−13	21	
17	Hadleigh United	15	6	0	9	31	35	−4	18	
18	AFC Sudbury reserves	21	5	0	16	29	66	−37	15	Possible relegation to a feeder league
19	Dussindale & Hellesdon Rovers	19	3	3	13	24	54	−30	12	Possible relegation to a feeder league
20	Needham Market reserves	19	3	2	14	26	58	−32	11	Possible relegation to a feeder league

Updated to match(es) played on 21 November 2026. Source: The FA Full-Time
Rules for classification: 1) Points; 2) Goal difference; 3) Number of goals scored; 4) Number of matches won; 5) Head-to-head results

=== Results table ===
Home \ Away	PEG	SUD	CLA	DIS	DHR	FPD	FRA	GOR	HAD	HAL	HLB	HLD	LNM	NHM	NMT	NRU	NTU	WHI	WIV	WRO
AFC Pegasus	—				3–1								2–0			3–0				
AFC Sudbury reserves		—							2–4							0–3				
Clacton Town	1–0		—		3–1	3–0														
Diss Town				—							1–2									
Dussindale & Hellesdon Rovers					—			2–2												1–4
FC Parson Drove						—						2–3								
Framlingham Town							—				5–2								0–1	
Gorleston reserves	2–3							—				1–1							3–4	
Hadleigh United									—					1–0			1–5			
Halesworth Town							2–1			—								6–0		
Holbeach United											—		3–2							
Holland				3–2								—							4–2	
Long Melford		1–0											—							5–0
Needham Market reserves														—				1–3		1–5
Newmarket Town reserves			1–1							2–1					—					
Norwich United								0–0						5–1		—				
Netherton United		2–0				3–4				2–0							—			
Whittlesey Athletic									2–3									—		
Wivenhoe Town						5–2													—	
Wroxham reserves									3–1											—

Updated to match(es) played on 8 August 2026. Source: The FA Full-Time
Legend: Blue = home team win; Yellow = draw; Red = away team win.
For upcoming matches, an "a" indicates there is an article about the rivalry between the two participants.

=== Stadia and locations ===
Locations of Division One North clubs

Team	Location	Stadium	Capacity
AFC Pegasus	Stanway	West Street (groundshare with Coggeshall Town)	2,000
AFC Sudbury reserves	Sudbury	King's Marsh	2,500
Clacton Town	Clacton-on-Sea	Rush Green Bowl	3,000
Diss Town	Diss	Brewers Green Lane	2,500
Dussindale & Hellesdon Rovers	Horsford	The Nest	1,000
FC Parson Drove	Parson Drove	Main Road	1,000
Framlingham Town	Framlingham	Badingham Road	1,000
Gorleston reserves	Gorleston-on-Sea	The Nest (groundshare with Dussindale & Hellesdon Rovers)	1,000
Hadleigh United	Hadleigh	Millfield	3,000
Halesworth Town	Halesworth	Dairy Hill	500
Holbeach United	Holbeach	Carters Park	4,000
Holland	Clacton-on-Sea (Holland-on-Sea)	Dulwich Road	500
Long Melford	Long Melford	Stoneylands	1,000
Needham Market reserves	Needham Market	Bloomfields	4,000
Netherton United	Peterborough (Netherton)	The Grange	1,000
Newmarket Town reserves	Newmarket	Cricket Field Road	2,750
Norwich United	Blofield	Plantation Park	3,000
Whittlesey Athletic	Whittlesey	Feldale Field	1,000
Wivenhoe Town	Wivenhoe	Broad Lane	2,876
Wroxham reserves	Wroxham	Trafford Park	2,500

== Division One South ==
Eastern Counties Football League Division One South
- Season: 2026–27

Division One South featured 17 clubs which competed in the division last season.

Five clubs joined the division:

- Athletic Newham, relegated from the Essex Senior League
- East Thurrock Community, promoted from the Essex & Suffolk Border League
- Hertford Heath, promoted from the Hertfordshire Senior County League
- London Fennecs, promoted from the Middlesex County League
- London Harts United, promoted from the Essex Alliance League

Four clubs left the division:

- Barkingside, relegated to the Essex Alliance League
- Clapton Community, promoted to the Essex Senior League
- FC Romania, relegated and folded at the end of the season
- Hutton, promoted to the Essex Senior League

Additionally, Newbury Forest was renamed to Marcelona.

=== League table ===
Pos	Team	Pld	W	D	L	GF	GA	GD	Pts	Promotion, qualification or relegation
1	Hoddesdon Town	17	14	3	0	54	13	+41	45	Promotion to the Premier Division
2	Stansted	21	12	6	3	36	19	+17	42	Qualification for the play-offs
3	May & Baker	17	12	2	3	46	21	+25	38	Qualification for the play-offs
4	Rayleigh Town	20	11	3	6	49	38	+11	36	Qualification for the play-offs
5	AS London	18	11	2	5	43	32	+11	35	Qualification for the play-offs
6	East Thurrock Community	19	10	2	7	37	37	0	32	
7	Lymore Gardens	16	8	4	4	35	22	+13	28	
8	Basildon Town	18	7	6	5	31	19	+12	27	
9	Athletic Newham	21	8	3	10	39	40	−1	27	
10	Cannons Wood	15	7	5	3	29	20	+9	26	
11	Coggeshall Town	16	8	2	6	36	33	+3	26	
12	Enfield Borough	19	7	4	8	38	43	−5	25	
13	Marcelona	18	6	6	6	42	34	+8	24	
14	Burnham Ramblers	19	6	6	7	30	37	−7	24	
15	London Harts United	16	6	5	5	41	28	+13	23	
16	Hertford Heath	12	6	2	4	25	22	+3	20	
17	Dunmow Town	20	5	3	12	26	50	−24	18	
18	Southend Manor	19	5	1	13	30	43	−13	16	
19	FC Baresi	19	3	5	11	17	30	−13	14	
20	London Fennecs	16	2	4	10	22	47	−25	10	Possible relegation to a feeder league
21	NW London	15	2	1	12	18	49	−31	7	Possible relegation to a feeder league
22	Brimsdown	17	0	1	16	15	62	−47	1	Possible relegation to a feeder league

Updated to match(es) played on 21 November 2026. Source: The FA Full-Time
Rules for classification: 1) Points; 2) Goal difference; 3) Number of goals scored; 4) Number of matches won; 5) Head-to-head results

=== Results table ===
Home \ Away	ASL	ATN	BAS	BRM	BUR	CNW	COG	DUN	ETC	EFB	BSI	HEH	HOD	LFE	LHU	LYG	MAR	M&B	NWL	RAY	SEM	STA
AS London	—											3–4										
Athletic Newham		—			4–1	1–1															0–1	
Basildon Town			—											1–1					1–1			
Brimsdown				—														0–3				
Burnham Ramblers					—		3–2			2–1											1–0	
Cannons Wood						—							0–0									
Coggeshall Town			1–0				—	2–1														
Dunmow Town		2–5		2–0				—														0–1
East Thurrock Community			2–1						—				2–6									0–2
Enfield Borough										—												
FC Baresi									1–2	1–1	—	1–4								5–2		
Hertford Heath												—										
Hoddesdon Town											2–1		—									
London Fennecs														—								
London Harts United														4–0	—							
Lymore Gardens	1–3	3–0														—						4–3
Marcelona										2–0					1–1		—					
May & Baker						2–0						4–0						—				
NW London													0–4		1–8				—			
Rayleigh Town														3–1			2–2			—		
Southend Manor						1–3															—	
Stansted																						—

Updated to match(es) played on 11 August 2026. Source: The FA Full-Time
Legend: Blue = home team win; Yellow = draw; Red = away team win.
For upcoming matches, an "a" indicates there is an article about the rivalry between the two participants.

=== Stadia and locations ===
Locations of Division One South clubs
Greater London Division One South football clubs

Team	Location	Stadium	Capacity
AS London	London (Wood Green)	New River Stadium	5,000
Athletic Newham	London (Dagenham)	Bobby Moore Sports Hub	800
Basildon Town	Basildon	Gardiners Close (groundshare with Basildon United)	2,000
Brimsdown	London (Brimsdown)	Parkside Stadium (side pitch)	
Burnham Ramblers	Burnham-on-Crouch	Leslie Fields	2,000
Cannons Wood	Harlow	Parkside Stadium (groundshare with Aveley)	3,500
Coggeshall Town	Coggeshall	West Street	2,000
Dunmow Town	Great Dunmow	Scraley Road (groundshare with Heybridge Swifts)	3,000
East Thurrock Community	Corringham	Rookery Hill	3,500
Enfield Borough	Enfield	The Maurice Rebak Stadium (groundshare with Wingate & Finchley)	1,500
FC Baresi	London	Wodson Park (groundshare with Ware)	3,300
Hertford Heath	Stanstead Abbotts	Recreation Ground	1,000
Hoddesdon Town	Hoddesdon	Lowfield	3,000
London Fennecs	London (Plaistow)	Terence McMillan Stadium	2,000
London Harts United	Harlow	The Harlow Arena (groundshare with Harlow Town)	3,500
Lymore Gardens	London (Waltham Forest)	Parkside Stadium (side pitch)	
Marcelona	Ilford (Barkingside)	Leslie Fields (groundshare with Burnham Ramblers)	2,000
May & Baker	Dagenham	Parsloes Park (groundshare with Athletic Newham)	1,500
NW London	London (Tottenham)	Coles Park (groundshare with Haringey Borough)	2,500
Rayleigh Town	Rayleigh	Len Salmon Stadium (groundshare with Bowers & Pitsea)	3,500
Southend Manor	Southend-on-Sea	Southchurch Park	2,000
Stansted	Stansted Mountfitchet	Hargrave Park	2,000
