= List of football clubs in England =

This is a list of football clubs that compete within the leagues and divisions of the men's English football league system as far down as Level 10 (Step 6), that is to say, six divisions below the Premier League/English Football League. Also included are clubs from outside England that play within the English system (suitably highlighted). The relative levels of divisions can be compared on the English football league system page.

== List of Leagues and Divisions ==
- Premier League (Level 1)
- EFL Championship (Level 2), EFL League One (Level 3), EFL League Two (Level 4)

Below these are the upper part of the National League System:

- National League National (Level 5/Step 1), North / South (Level 6/Step 2)
- Isthmian League Premier (Level 7/Step 3), One North / One South Central / One South East (Level 8/Step 4)
- Northern Premier League Premier (Level 7/Step 3), One East / One Midlands / One West (Level 8/Step 4)
- Southern Football League Premier Central / Premier South (Level 7/Step 3), One Central / One South (Level 8/Step 4)

Below these are the remainder of the National League System, that feed into the Level 8/Step 4 leagues:

- Combined Counties Football League Premier North / Premier South (Level 9/Step 5), One (Level 10/Step 6)
- Eastern Counties Football League Premier (Level 9/Step 5), One North / One South (Level 10/Step 6)
- Essex Senior Football League (Level 9/Step 5 only)
- Hellenic Football League Premier (Level 9/Step 5), One (Level 10/Step 6)
- Midland Football League Premier (Level 9/Step 5), One (Level 10/Step 6), plus a Division Two at Level 11
- North West Counties Football League Premier (Level 9/Step 5), One North / One South (Level 10/Step 6)
- Northern Counties East Football League Premier (Level 9/Step 5), One (Level 10/Step 6)
- Northern Football League One (Level 9/Step 5), Two (Level 10/Step 6)
- Southern Combination Football League Premier (Level 9/Step 5), One (Level 10/Step 6), plus a Division Two at Level 11
- Southern Counties East Football League Premier (Level 9/Step 5), One (Level 10/Step 6)
- South West Peninsula League Premier East / Premier West (Level 10/Step 6 only)
- Spartan South Midlands Football League Premier (Level 9/Step 5), One (Level 10/Step 6), plus a Division Two at Level 11
- United Counties League Premier North / Premier South (Level 9/Step 5), One (Level 10/Step 6)
- Wessex Football League Premier (Level 9/Step 5), One (Level 10/Step 6)
- Western Football League Premier (Level 9/Step 5), One (Level 10/Step 6)

Below these (starting at Level 11/Step 7) are the Regional Feeder Leagues and below, which become increasingly local, and reach all the way down to Level 20.

== Alphabetical list of Clubs ==
The divisions are correct for the 2026–27 season.

=== Key ===
Key to divisional changes
New club
Club was promoted to a higher level.
Club was transferred between divisions at the same level.
Club resigned or was demoted to a lower level.
Club was relegated to a lower level.

=== 0–9 ===
Club	League/Division	Lvl	Nickname	Change from 2025–26
1874 Northwich	Northern Premier League Division One West	8	Greens	From Midland League Premier

=== A ===
Club	League/Division	Lvl	Nickname	Change from 2025–26
AEK Boco	Western League Division One	10	Bears	
AS London	Eastern Counties League Division One South	10	tbc	
AFC Aldermaston	Wessex League Division One	10	Atom Men	
AFC Blackpool	North West Counties League Division One North	10	Mechanics	
AFC Bournemouth	Premier League	1	Cherries	
AFC Bridgnorth	North West Counties League Division One South	10	Meadow Men	From Midland League One
AFC Croydon Athletic	Isthmian League South East Division	8	Rams	
AFC Fylde	National League	5	Coasters	From National League North
AFC Greenwich Borough	Southern Counties East League Premier Division	9	tbc	From Southern Counties East League One
AFC Knowsley	North West Counties League Division One North	10	tbc	New club
AFC Liverpool	North West Counties League Premier Division	9	Little Reds	
AFC Mansfield	United Counties League Premier Division North	9	Bulls	
AFC Newbiggin	Northern League Division Two	10	tbc	
AFC North Kilworth	Midland League Division One	10	tbc	
AFC Pegasus	Eastern Counties League Division One North	10	Pego	New name - formerly Stanway Pegasus
AFC Portchester	Isthmian League South Central Division	8	Royals	
AFC Rushden & Diamonds	Northern Premier League Division One Midlands	8	Diamonds	
AFC St Austell	South West Peninsula League Premier Division West	10	Lillywhites	From Western League Premier (expelled)
AFC Stoneham	Isthmian League South Central Division	8	Purples	From Wessex League Premier
AFC Sudbury	Isthmian League North Division	8	Yellows	From Southern League Premier Central
AFC Sudbury Reserves	Eastern Counties League Division One North	10	Yellows	
AFC Telford United	National League North	6	Stags	
AFC Totton	National League South	6	Stags	
AFC Varndeanians	Southern Combination League Premier Division	9	V's	
AFC Walcountians	Southern Combination League Division One	10	Counts	
AFC Welwyn	Spartan South Midlands League Premier Division	9	Romans	
AFC Whyteleafe	Isthmian League Premier Division	7	Leafe	From Isthmian League One South East
AFC Wimbledon	EFL League One	3	Dons	
AFC Wolverhampton City	Midland League Premier Division	9	Wulfs	
Abbey Hey	North West Counties League Premier Division	9	Red Rebels	
Abbey Hulton United	Midland League Premier Division	9	tbc	
Abbey Rangers	Combined Counties League Premier Division South	9	Abbey	
Abingdon United	Combined Counties League Premier Division North	9	U's	
Accrington Stanley	EFL League Two	4	Stanley	
Albion Sports	Northern Counties East League Premier Division	9	Lions	
Alcester Town	Hellenic League Division One	10	Romans	
Aldershot Town	National League	5	Shots	
Alfreton Town	Northern Premier League Premier Division	7	Reds	From National League North
Allscott Heath	North West Counties League Division One South	10	Monners	
Almondsbury	Western League Division One	10	Almonds	
Alnwick Town	Northern League Division Two	10	Magpies	
Alresford Town	Wessex League Division One	10	Magpies	
Alsager Town	North West Counties League Division One South	10	Bullets	
Alton	Combined Counties League Premier Division South	9	Brewers	
Altrincham	National League	5	Robins	
Alvechurch	Southern League Premier Division Central	7	Church	
Amersham Town	Combined Counties League Premier Division North	9	Magpies	
Amesbury Town	Western League Division One	10	Blues	From Wessex League One
Ampthill Town	Spartan South Midlands League Division One	10	Amps	
Andover New Street	Wessex League Premier Division	9	Street	
Anstey Nomads	Southern League Premier Division Central	7	Nomads	From Northern Premier League One Midlands
Anstey Town	Midland League Division One	10	tbc	From Leicestershire Senior League Premier
Appleby Frodingham	Northern Counties East League Division One	10	Steelmen	
Ardley United	Combined Counties League Premier Division North	9	tbc	
Arlesey Town	Spartan South Midlands League Premier Division	9	Blues	
Armthorpe Welfare	Northern Counties East League Division One	10	Wellie	
Arsenal	Premier League	1	Gunners	
Arundel	Southern Combination League Division One	10	Mullets	
Ascot United	Isthmian League South Central	8	Yellamen	
Ash United	Wessex League Division One	10	Green Army	
Ashby Ivanhoe	United Counties League Premier Division North	9	Knights	
Ashford Town (Middlesex)	Isthmian League South Central Division	8	Tangerines	From Combined Counties League Premier North
Ashford United	Isthmian League South East Division	8	Nuts & Bolts	
Ashington	Northern Premier League Division One East	8	Colliers	
Ashton Athletic	North West Counties League Division One North	10	Ashes	
Ashton Town	North West Counties League Division One North	10	Town	
Ashton United	Northern Premier League Premier Division	7	Robins	
Ashville	North West Counties League Division One North	10	Villa	From North West Counties League One South
Aston Villa	Premier League	1	Villa	
Athersley Recreation	Northern Counties East League Division One	10	Penguins	
Atherstone Town	United Counties League Premier Division South	9	Adders	
Atherton Collieries	Northern Premier League Division One West	8	Colls	
Atherton Laburnum Rovers	North West Counties League Premier Division	9	Laburnums	
Athletic Newham	Eastern Counties League Division One South	10	Kings	From Essex Senior League
Aveley	Isthmian League Premier Division	7	Millers	
Avonmouth	Western League Division One	10	tbc	
Avro	Northern Premier League Premier Division	7	Vulcans	From Northern Premier League One West
Axminster Town	South West Peninsula League Premier Division East	10	Tigers	
Aylesbury United	Southern League Division One Central	8	Ducks	
Aylesbury Vale Dynamos	Spartan South Midlands League Premier Division	9	Dynamoe	
Aylestone Park	United Counties League Premier Division North	9	Park	From United Counties League Premier South

=== B ===
Club	League/Division	Lvl	Nickname	Change from 2025–26
Bacup Borough	North West Counties League Division One North	10	Borough	
Badshot Lea	Combined Counties League Premier Division South	9	Baggies	
Baffins Milton Rovers	Wessex League Premier Division	9	tbc	
Baldock Town	Spartan South Midlands League Premier Division	9	Reds	
Balham	Combined Counties League Premier Division South	9	tbc	
Bamber Bridge	Northern Premier League Premier Division	7	Brig	
Banbury United	Southern League Premier Division Central	7	Puritans	
Banstead Athletic	Southern Counties East League Division One	10	A's	
Barking	Essex Senior League	9	Blues	
Barnet	EFL League Two	4	Bees	
Barnoldswick Town	North West Counties League Premier Division	9	Barlick	
Barnsley	EFL League One	3	Tykes	
Barnstaple Town	Southern League Division One South	8	Barum	From Western League Premier
Barnton	North West Counties League Division One South	10	Villagers	
Barrow	National League	5	Bluebirds	From EFL League Two
Barton Rovers	Southern League Division One Central	8	Rovers	
Barton Town	Northern Counties East League Premier Division	9	Swans	
Barwell	Northern Premier League Division One Midlands	8	Kirkby Roaders	From Southern League Premier Central
Basford United	Northern Premier League Division One Midlands	8	Basses	
Bashley	Wessex League Premier Division	9	Bash	From Southern League One South
Basildon Town	Eastern Counties League Division One South	10	tbc	
Basildon United	Essex Senior League	9	Bees	
Basingstoke Town	Southern League Premier Division South	7	Dragons	
Bath City	Southern League Premier Division South	7	Romans	From National League South
Beaconsfield Town	Southern League Division One Central	8	Rams	
Bearsted	Southern Counties East League Premier Division	9	Bears	
Beckenham Town	Southern Counties East League Premier Division	9	Becks	From Isthmian League One South East
Bedfont	Combined Counties League Premier Division North	9	Yellows	From Combined Counties League One
Bedfont Sports	Isthmian League South Central Division	8	Eagles	
Bedford Town	National League North	6	Eagles	
Bedworth United	Northern Premier League Division One Midlands	8	Greenbacks	
Belper Town	Northern Premier League Division One Midlands	8	Nailers	
Belper United	United Counties League Premier Division North	9	tbc	
Belstone	Combined Counties League Division One	10	tbc	
Bemerton Heath Harlequins	Wessex League Premier Division	9	Harlequins	
Benfleet	Essex Senior League	9	tbc	
Berkhamsted	Southern League Premier Division South	7	Comrades	
Berks County	Combined Counties League Division One	10	Swords	
Beverley Town	Northern Premier League Division One East	8	Beavers	From Northern Counties East League Premier
Bewdley Town	Hellenic League Division One	10	Riversiders	
Bexhill United	Southern Combination League Premier Division	9	Pirates	
Bideford	Southern League Division One South	8	Robins	
Biggleswade	Southern League Premier Division One Central	8	FC	
Biggleswade Town	Southern League Division One Central	8	Waders	
Biggleswade United	Spartan South Midlands League Premier Division	9	United	
Billericay Town	National League South	6	Blues	From Isthmian League Premier
Billingham Synthonia	Northern League Division Two	10	Synners	
Billingham Town	Northern League Division Two	10	Billy Town	
Billingshurst	Southern Combination League Premier Division	9	Hurst	From Southern Combination League One
Bilston Town	North West Counties League Division One South	10	Steelmen	From Midland League One
Binfield	Isthmian League South Central Division	8	Moles	
Birmingham City	EFL Championship	2	Blues	
Birmingham OJM	Midland League Division One	10	Rangers	Name change - formerly OJM Black Country Rangers
Birstall United	Midland League Division One	10	tbc	
Birtley Town	Northern League Division One	9	Green & White Army	
Bishop Auckland	Northern League Division One	9	Bishops	From Northern Premier League One East
Bishop's Cleeve	Southern League Division One South	8	Mitres	
Bishops Lydeard	South West Peninsula League Premier Division East	10	tbc	
Bishop's Stortford	Southern League Premier Division Central	7	Bishops	
Bitton	Western League Division One	10	River Boys	
Blackburn Rovers	EFL Championship	2	Rovers	
Blackpool	EFL League One	3	Seasiders	
Blackstones	United Counties League Premier Division North	9	Stones	
Blandford United	Wessex League Division One	10	Royals	From Dorset Premier League
Blyth Spartans	Northern Premier League Division One East	8	Spartans	
Blyth Town	Northern League Division One	9	Braves	From Northern Premier League One East
Bognor Regis Town	Isthmian League South Central Division	8	Rocks	
Boldmere Rangers	Midland League Division One	10	tbc	Name change - formerly Smethwick Rangers
Boldmere St. Michaels	Northern Premier League Division One Midlands	8	Mikes	
Boldon Community Association	Northern League Division Two	10	tbc	
Bolton Wanderers	EFL Championship	2	Trotters	From EFL League One
Bootle	Northern Premier League Division One West	8	Bucks	
Boreham Wood	National League	5	Wood	
Boston Town	Northern Premier League Division One Midlands	8	Poachers	From United Counties League Premier North
Boston United	National League	5	Pilgrims	
Bottesford Town	Northern Counties East League Premier Division	9	Poachers	
Bourne Town	Northern Premier League Division One Midlands	8	Wakes	
Bournemouth	Wessex League Premier Division	9	Poppers	
Bovey Tracey	Western League Premier Division	9	Moorlanders	From South West Peninsula League Premier East
Bovingdon	Combined Counties League Division One	10	tbc	From Spartan South Midlands League Two
Bowers & Pitsea	Isthmian League North Division	8	Bowers	
Brackley Town	National League North	6	Saints	From National League
Bracknell Town	Southern League Premier Division South	7	Robins	
Bradford City	EFL League One	3	Bantams	
Bradford (Park Avenue)	Northern Premier League Division One East	8	Avenue	
Bradford Town	Hellenic League Premier Division	9	Brad	From Western League Premier
Braintree Town	National League South	6	Iron	From National League
Brantham Athletic	Eastern Counties League Premier Division	9	Blue Imps	From Isthmian League One North
Brentford	Premier League	1	Bees	
Brentwood Town	Isthmian League Premier Division	7	Blues	
Brereton Social	North West Counties League Division One South	10	Social	From Staffordshire County Senior League Premier
Bridgwater Town	Western League Premier Division	9	Robins	
Bridlington Town	Northern Premier League Division One East	8	Seasiders	
Bearsted	Southern Counties East League Division One	10	Ropes	
Bridport	South West Peninsula League Premier Division East	10	Bees	
Brigg Town	Northern Counties East League Division One	10	Zebras	
Brightlingsea Regent	Isthmian League North Division	8	R's	
Brighton & Hove Albion	Premier League	1	Seagulls	
Brimscombe & Thrupp	Hellenic League Division One	10	Lilywhites	
Brimsdown	Eastern Counties League Division One South	10	Limers	
Brislington	Western League Premier Division}	9	Foxes	
Bristol City	EFL Championship	2	Robins	
Bristol Manor Farm	Southern League Division One South	8	Farm	
Bristol Rovers	EFL League Two	4	Pirates	
Bristol Telephones	Western League Division One	10	Phones	
Brixham	Western League Premier Division	9	Fishermen	From Southern League One South
Broadbridge Heath	Isthmian League South East Division	8	Bears	
Broadfields United	Combined Counties League Premier Division North	9	Limers	
Brockenhurst	Wessex League Premier Division	9	Badgers	
Brocton	Midland League Premier Division	9	Badgers	
Bromley	EFL League One	3	Ravens	From EFL League Two
Bromsgrove Sporting	Southern League Premier Division Central	7	Rouslers	
Bromyard Town	Hellenic League Division One	10	tbc	From Herefordshire League Premier
Brook House	Combined Counties League Division One	10	Brook	
Buckhurst Hill	Isthmian League North Division	8	Stags	From Essex Senior League
Buckingham	Spartan South Midlands League Division One	10	Ath	
Buckland Athletic	Western League Premier Division	9	Bucks	
Bude Town	South West Peninsula League Premier Division West	10	tbc	
Bugbrooke St Michaels	United Counties League Premier Division South	9	Badgers	
Burgess Hill Town	Isthmian League Premier Division	7	Hillians	
Burnham	Combined Counties League Premier Division North	9	Blues	
Burnham Ramblers	Eastern Counties League Division One South	10	Ramblers	
Burnley	EFL Championship	2	Clarets	From Premier League
Burscough	North West Counties League Premier Division	9	Linnets	
Bustleholme	Midland League Division One	10	B's	From West Midlands (Regional) League Premier
Burton Albion	EFL League One	3	Brewers	
Burton Park Wanderers	Spartan South Midlands League Division One	10	Wanderers	From Northamptonshire Combination League Premier
Bury	Northern Premier League Premier Division	7	Shakers	From Northern Premier League One West
Bury Town	Southern League Premier Division Central	7	Blues	
Buxton	National League North	6	Bucks	

=== C ===
Club	League/Division	Lvl	Nickname	Change from 2025–26
Cadbury Heath	Western League Division One	10	Heathens	
Callington Town	South West Peninsula League Premier Division West	10	Cally	
Calne Town	Western League Division One	10	Lilywhites	
Camberley Town	Combined Counties League Premier Division South	9	Krooners	
Cambridge City	Isthmian League North Division	8	Lilywhites	
Cambridge United	EFL League One	3	U's	From EFL League Two
Camelford	South West Peninsula League Premier Division West	10	Camels	
Cammell Laird 1907	North West Counties League Division One North	10	Camels	From North West Counties League One South
Campion	Northern Counties East League Premier Division	9	tbc	
Cannons Wood	Eastern Counties League Division One South	10	Cannons	
Canvey Island	Isthmian League North Division	8	Gulls	From Isthmian League Premier
Cardiff City (Wales)	EFL Championship	2	Bluebirds	From EFL League One
Carlisle City	Northern League Division One	9	Sky Blues	
Carlisle United	National League	5	Cumbrians	
Carlton Town	Northern Premier League Division One Midlands	8	Millers	
Carshalton Athletic	Isthmian League Premier Division	7	Robins	
Carterton	Hellenic League Division One	10	tbc	
Chadderton	North West Counties League Premier Division	9	Chaddy	
Charlton Athletic	EFL Championship	2	Addicks	
Charnock Richard	North West Counties League Premier Division	9	Villagers	
Chasetown	Northern Premier League Division One West	8	Scholars	
Chatham Town	Isthmian League Premier Division	7	Chats	
Cheadle Heath Nomads	North West Counties League Division One South	10	Nomads	From North West Counties League One North
Cheadle Town	Midland League Premier Division	9	tbc	From North West Counties League Premier
Chelmsford City	National League South	6	Clarets	
Chelmsley Town	Midland League Division One	10	tbc	
Chelsea	Premier League	1	Blues	
Cheltenham Saracens	Hellenic League Division One	10	Saracens	
Cheltenham Town	EFL League Two	4	Robins	
Chertsey Town	Southern League Premier Division South	7	Curfews	
Chesham United	National League South	6	Generals	
Cheshunt	Isthmian League Premier Division	7	Ambers	
Chester	National League North	6	Blues	
Chesterfield	EFL League Two	4	Spireites	
Chester-le-Street Town	Northern League Division Two	10	Cestrians	
Chichester City	Southern League Premier Division South	7	Lillywhites	From Isthmian League Premier
Chippenham Town	Southern League Premier Division South	7	Bluebirds	From National League South
Chipping Sodbury Town	Hellenic League Division One	10	Sods	
Chipstead	Combined Counties League Premier Division South	9	Chips	
Chiselhurst Glebe	Southern Counties East League Premier Division	9	tbc	New name - formerly Glebe
Chorley	National League North	6	Magpies	
Christchurch	Wessex League Premier Division	9	Priory	
Cinderford Town	Hellenic League Premier Division	9	Foresters	
Cirencester Town	Hellenic League Premier Division	9	Centurions	
Clacton Town	Eastern Counties League Division One North	10	Seasiders	New name - formerly FC Clacton
Clanfield (Hampshire)	Southern Combination League Division One	10	Clan	From Wessex League One
Clanfield (85)	Hellenic League Division One	10	Robins	
Clapton Community	Essex Senior League	9	Tons	From Eastern Counties League One South
Clay Cross Town	United Counties League Premier Division North	9	Millers/Rebels	
Cleethorpes Town	Northern Premier League Premier Division	7	Owls	
Clevedon Town	Western League Premier Division	9	Seasiders	
Clifton All Whites	United Counties League Division One	10	All Whites	
Clipstone	United Counties League Division One	10	Cobras	
Clitheroe	Northern Premier League Division One West	8	Blues	
Club Thorne Colliery	Northern Counties East League Division One	10	Colls	
Coalville Town	Midland League Division One	10	Ravens	From United Counties League One
Cobham	Isthmian League South Central Division	8	Hammers	From Combined Counties League Premier South
Cockfosters	Spartan South Midlands League Premier Division	9	Fosters	
Coggeshall Town	Eastern Counties League Division One South	10	Seedgrowers	
Colchester United	EFL League Two	4	U's	
Colden Common	Wessex League Division One	10	Commoners	
Coleshill Town	Northern Premier League Division One Midlands	8	Colemen	
Colliers Wood United	Combined Counties League Premier Division One	10	Wood	
Colne	North West Counties League Division One North	10	Reds	
Colney Heath	Spartan South Midlands League Premier Division	9	Magpies	
Concord Rangers	Isthmian League North Division	8	Beach Boys	
Congleton Town	Northern Premier League Division One West	8	Bears	
Consett	Northern Premier League Division One East	8	Steelmen	
Corby Town	Northern Premier League Division One Midlands	8	Steelmen	
Corinthian	Southern Counties East League Premier Division	9	Hoops	
Corinthian-Casuals	Combined Counties League Premier Division South	9	Casuals	
Cornard United	Eastern Counties League Premier Division	9	Ards	
Corsham Town	Hellenic League Premier Division	9	Peacocks	
Cotgrave	United Counties League Division One	10	tbc	From Nottinghamshire Senior League Premier
Coton Green	United Counties League Premier Division South	9	Green Army	From Midland League Premier
Cove	Wessex League Division One	10	Wasps	
Coventry City	Premier League	1	Sky Blues	From EFL Championship
Coventry Copsewood	Midland League Division One	10	G's	
Coventry Sphinx	United Counties League Premier Division South	9	Sphinx	From Northern Premier League One Midlands
Coventry United	Northern Premier League Division One Midlands	8	Red & Greens	From United Counties League Premier South
Cowes Sports	Wessex League Premier Division	9	Yachtsmen	
Cradley Town	Midland League Division One	10	Hammers	
Cranfield United	Spartan South Midlands League Division One	10	United	
Crawley Down Gatwick	Southern Combination League Premier Division	9	Anvils	
Crawley Green	Spartan South Midlands League Division One	10	Bluemen	From Spartan South Midlands League Premier
Crawley Town	EFL League Two	4	Reds	
Cray Valley Paper Mills	Isthmian League South East Division	8	Millers	From Isthmian League Premier
Cray Wanderers	Isthmian League Premier Division	7	Wands	
Crediton United	South West Peninsula League Premier Division East	10	Kirton	
Crewe	North West Counties League Division One South	10	tbc	New club
Crewe Alexandra	EFL League Two	4	Railwaymen	
Cribbs	Hellenic League Premier Division	9	Cribbs	
Crook Town	Northern League Division One	9	Black & Ambers	
Crowborough Athletic	Isthmian League South East Division	8	Crows	
Crowle Colts	Northern Counties East League Division One	10	Colts	
Croydon	Southern Counties East League Division One	10	Trams	
Crystal Palace	Premier League	1	Eagles	
Cullompton Rangers	South West Peninsula League Premier Division East	10	Rangers	
Curzon Ashton	Northern Premier League Premier Division	7	Blues	From National League North

=== D ===
Club	League/Division	Lvl	Nickname	Change from 2025–26
Dagenham & Redbridge	National League South	6	Daggers	
Daisy Hill	North West Counties League Division One North	10	Daisies	
Darlaston Town (1874)	Midland League Premier Division	9	Citizens	From Northern Premier League One West
Darlington	National League North	6	Quakers	
Darlington Town	Northern League Division Two	10	Darlings	
Dartford	Isthmian League Premier Division	7	Darts	
Darwen F.C.	North West Counties League Division One North	10	Salmoners	
Daventry Town	United Counties League Premier Division South	9	Town	
Dawley Town	North West Counties League Division One South	10	Jockeys	From Shropshire County League Premier
Deal Town	Isthmian League South East Division	8	Fivers	
Dearne & District	Northern Counties East League Premier Division	9	tbc	From Northern Counties East League One
Deeping Rangers	United Counties League Premier Division North	9	Rangers	
Derby County	EFL Championship	2	Rams	
Dereham Town	Eastern Counties League Premier Division	9	Magpies	
Desborough Town	United Counties League Premier Division South	9	Ar Tarn	From Spartan South Midlands League One
Devizes Town	Hellenic League Premier Division	9	Town	From Western League One
Dial Square	Southern Combination League Division One	10	Dial	From Surrey Premier County League
Didcot Town	Southern League Division One Central	8	Gunners	From Southern League One South
Diss Town	Eastern Counties League Division One North	10	Tangerines	
Dobwalls	South West Peninsula League Premier Division West	10	Dingos	
Doncaster City	Northern Counties East League Division One	10	tbc	
Doncaster Rovers	EFL League One	3	Vikings	
Dorchester Town	Southern League Division One South	8	Magpies	From Southern League Premier South
Dorking Wanderers	National League South	6	Wanderers	
Dorking Wanderers "B"	Southern Combination League Division One	10	Wanderers	
Dover Athletic	National League South	6	Whites	
Downham Town	Eastern Counties League Premier Division	9	Town	From Isthmian League One North
Downton	Wessex League Premier Division	9	Robins	
Droitwich Spa	Hellenic League Premier Division	9	Saltmen	
Dronfield Town	United Counties League Division One	10	tbc	
Droylsden	North West Counties League Premier Division	9	Bloods	From North West Counties League One North
Dudley Town	Midland League Premier Division	9	Reds	
Dulwich Hamlet	Isthmian League Premier Division	7	Hamlet	
Dunkirk	United Counties League Division One	10	Boatmen	
Dunmow Town	Eastern Counties League Division One South	10	Tons	
Dunstable	Spartan South Midlands League Premier Division	9	Blues	New club (a merger of Dunstable Town and AFC Dunstable)
Dunston UTS	Northern Premier League Division One East	8	Fed	
Durham United	Northern League Division Two	10	tbc	
Dussindale & Hellesdon Rovers	Eastern Counties League Division One North	10	Dussy	

=== E ===
Club	League/Division	Lvl	Nickname	Change from 2025–26
Easington Colliery	Northern League Division One	9	Colliery	
Easington Sports	Combined Counties League Premier Division North	9	Clan	From United Counties League Premier South
East Cowes Victoria Athletic	Wessex League Premier Division	9	Vics	
East Grinstead Town	Southern Combination League Premier Division	9	Wasps	From Isthmian League One South East
East Preston	Southern Combination League Division One	10	EP	
East Thurrock Community	Eastern Counties League Division One South	10	Rocks	From Essex and Suffolk Border League Premier
Eastbourne Borough	Isthmian League Premier Division	7	Sports	From National League South
Eastbourne Town	Isthmian League South East Division	8	Town	
Eastbourne United	Southern Combination League Premier Division	9	United	
Eastleigh	National League	5	Spitfires	
Eastwood	United Counties League Premier Division North	9	Red Badgers	
Eaton Socon	Spartan South Midlands League Division One	10	tbc	
Ebbsfleet United	National League South	6	Fleet	
Eccleshall	North West Counties League Division One South	10	Eagles	
Edgware & Kingsbury	Combined Counties League Division One	10	Wares	
Egham Town	Isthmian League South Central Division	8	Sarnies	
Elburton Villa	South West Peninsula League Premier Division East	10	Villa	From South West Peninsula League Premier Division West
Ely City	Eastern Counties League Premier Division	9	Robins	
Emley	Northern Premier League Premier Division	7	Pewits	From Northern Premier League One East
Enfield Borough	Eastern Counties League Division One South	10	Panthers	
Enfield	Spartan South Midlands League Premier Division	9	E's	
Enfield Town	Isthmian League Premier Division	7	Towners	From National League South
Epsom & Ewell	Combined Counties League Premier Division South	9	Salts	
Erith & Belvedere	Southern Counties East League Premier Division	9	Deres	
Erith Town	Isthmian League South East Division	8	Dockers	
Euxton Villa	North West Counties League Premier Division	9	tbc	
Everett Rovers	Spartan South Midlands League Premier Division	9	tbc	From Spartan South Midlands League One
Eversley & California	Combined Counties League Premier Division South	9	Boars	
Everton	Premier League	1	Toffees	
Evesham United	Southern League Premier Division South	7	Robins	
Exeter City	EFL League Two	4	Grecians	From EFL League One
Exmouth Town	Southern League Division One South	8	Town	
Eynesbury Rovers	United Counties League Premier Division South	9	Rovers	

=== F ===
Club	League/Division	Lvl	Nickname	Change from 2025–26
FC Baresi	Eastern Counties League Division One South	10	tbc	
FC Elmstead	Southern Counties East League Division One	10	Cocks	
FC Deportivo Galicia	Combined Counties League Division One	10	Depor	
FC Halifax Town	National League	5	Shaymen	
FC Hartlepool	Northern League Division Two	10	tbc	
FC Isle of Man	North West Counties League Premier Division	9	Ravens	
FC Parson Drove	Eastern Counties League Division One North	10	Drove	
FC Peterborough	United Counties League Premier Division South	9	tbc	From Eastern Counties League One North
FC St Helens	North West Counties League Premier Division	9	Stripes	
FC Stratford	United Counties League Premier Division South	9	Blues	From Hellenic League One
FC United of Manchester	Northern Premier League Premier Division	7	Red Rebels	
FCV Grace Dieu	Midland League Division One	10	The Academy	From United Counties League One
Fairford Town	Hellenic League Premier Division	9	Town	
Fakenham Town	Isthmian League North Division	8	Ghosts	From Eastern Counties League Premier
Falmouth Town	Southern League Division One South	8	Ambers	
Falmouth Town Reserves	South West Peninsula League Premier Division West	10	Ambers	
Fareham Town	Wessex League Premier Division	9	Creeksiders	From Isthmian League One South Central
Farnborough	National League South	6	Yellows	
Farnham Town	National League South	6	Town	From Southern League Premier South
Faversham Strike Force	Southern Counties East League Premier Division	9	tbc	
Faversham Town	Isthmian League South East Division	8	Lilywhites	
Fawley	Wessex League Division One	10	Oilers	
Felixstowe & Walton United	Isthmian League North Division	8	Seasiders	
Field Olympic	Northern Counties East League Division One	10	tbc	From West Yorkshire League Premier
Fisher	Southern Counties East League Premier Division	9	Fish	
Flackwell Heath	Southern League Division One Central	8	Heathens	
Fleet Town	Combined Counties League Premier Division South	9	Blues	
Fleetlands	Wessex League Premier Division	9	Coptermen	From Wessex League One
Fleetwood Town	EFL League Two	4	Fishermen	
Flixton	North West Counties League Division One North	10	Lions	Returned club
Foley Meir	North West Counties League Division One South	10	tbc	
Folkestone Invicta	National League South	6	Seasiders	From Isthmian League Premier
Folland Sports	Wessex League Division One	10	Planemakers	
Forest Green Rovers	National League	5	Rovers	
Forest Row	Southern Combination League Premier Division	9	Frow	
Framlingham Town	Eastern Counties League Division One North	10	Castlemen	
Frenford	Essex Senior League	9	tbc	
Frickley Athletic	Northern Counties East League Premier Division	9	Blues	
Frimley Green	Wessex League Division One	10	Green	
Frome Town	Southern League Premier Division South	7	Robins	From Isthmian League One South South
Fulham	Premier League	1	Cottagers	
Fulwood Amateurs	North West Counties League Division One North	10	tbc	

=== G ===
Club	League/Division	Lvl	Nickname	Change from 2025–26
GNG Oadby Town	Midland League Division One	10	Poachers	From United Counties League Premier South
Gainsborough Trinity	Northern Premier League Premier Division	7	Holy Blues	
Garforth Town	Northern Premier League Division One East	8	Miners	
Garstang	North West Counties League Division One North	10	tbc	
Gateshead	National League	5	Heed	
Gedling Miners Welfare	United Counties League Division One	10	Welfare	
Gillingham	EFL League Two	4	Gills	
Glossop North End	North West Counties League Premier Division	9	Hillmen	
Gloucester City	Southern League Premier Division South	7	Tigers	
Godalming Town	Combined Counties League Premier Division South	9	G's	From Southern Combination League One
Godmanchester Rovers	United Counties League Premier Division South	9	Goddy	
Golcar United	Northern Counties East League Premier Division	9	Weavers	
Goole	Northern Counties East League Division One	10	Vikings	
Gorleston	Isthmian League North Division	8	Greens	
Gorleston Reserves	Eastern Counties League Division One North	10	Greens	
Gornal Athletic	Midland League Division One	10	Peacocks	
Gosport Borough	Southern League Premier Division South	7	Boro'	
Grangetown Boys Club	Northern League Division Two	10	tbc	
Grantham Town	Northern Premier League Division One Midlands	8	Gingerbreads	From United Counties League Premier North
Grays Athletic	Isthmian League North Division	8	Gravelmen	
Great Wakering Rovers	Essex Senior League	9	Rovers	
Great Yarmouth Town	Eastern Counties League Premier Division	9	Bloaters	
Greenways	Southern Counties East League Division One	10	tbc	
Gresley Rovers	United Counties League Premier Division North	9	Moatmen	
Grimsby Borough	Northern Premier League Division One East	8	Wilderness Boys	
Grimsby Town	EFL League Two	4	Mariners	
Guernsey	Southern Combination League Premier Division	9	Green Lions	
Guildford City	Southern Combination League Division One	10	Sweeney	From Combined Counties League Premier South
Guisborough Town	Northern Premier League Division One East	8	Priorymen	From Northern League One
Guiseley	Northern Premier League Premier Division	7	Lions	

=== H ===
Club	League/Division	Lvl	Nickname	Change from 2025–26
Hackney Wick	Essex Senior League	9	Wickers	
Hadleigh United	Eastern Counties League Division One North	10	Brettsiders	From Eastern Counties League Premier
Hadley	Southern League Division One Central	8	Bricks	
Hailsham Town	Southern Combination League Division One	10	Stringers	From Southern Combination League Two
Halesowen Town	Southern League Premier Division Central	7	Yeltz	
Halesworth Town	Eastern Counties League Division One North	10	tbc	
Halewood Apollo	North West Counties League Division One North	10	tbc	New club
Hallam	Northern Premier League Division One East	8	Countrymen	
Hallen	Hellenic League Premier Division	9	Armadillos	
Halls Athletic	Southern Counties East League Division One	10	tbc	
Halstead Town	Essex Senior League	9	Humbugs	
Hamble Club	Wessex League Premier Division	9	Monks	
Hampton & Richmond Borough	National League South	6	Beavers	
Hamworthy Recreation	Wessex League Premier Division	9	Rec	
Hamworthy United	Wessex League Division One	10	Hammers	
Handsworth	Northern Counties East League Premier Division	9	Ambers	
Hanley Town	Northern Premier League Division One West	8	tbc	From Midland League Premier
Hanwell Town	Southern League Premier Division South	7	Geordies	
Hanworth Villa	Southern League Premier Division South	7	Villains	From Isthmian League One South Central
Harborough Town	National League North	6	Bees	From Southern League Premier Central
Harefield United	Combined Counties League Premier Division North	9	Hares	
Haringey Borough	Southern League Division One Central	8	Borough	From Spartan South Midlands League Premier
Harleston Town	Eastern Counties League Premier Division	9	tbc	
Harlow Town	Spartan South Midlands League Premier Division	9	Hawks	
Harpenden Town	Spartan South Midlands League Premier Division	9	Harps	
Harrogate Railway Athletic	Northern Counties East League Division One	10	Locomotives	
Harrogate Town	National League	5	Town	From EFL League Two
Harrow Borough	Isthmian League South Central Division	8	Boro	
Harrowby United	United Counties League Division One	10	Arrows	From United Counties League Premier North
Hartlepool United	National League	5	Pools	
Hartley Wintney	Isthmian League South Central Division	8	Row	
Hartpury	Southern League Division One South	8	tbc	new name - formerly Hartpury University
Harwich & Parkeston	Essex Senior League	9	Shrimpers	
Hashtag United	Isthmian League North Division	8	Tags	From Isthmian League Premier
Hassocks	Southern Combination League Premier Division	9	Robins	From Isthmian League One South East
Hastings United	Isthmian League South East Division	8	Arrows	
Havant & Waterlooville	Southern League Premier Division South	7	Hawks	
Haverhill Rovers	Eastern Counties League Premier Division	9	Reds	
Hayes & Yeading United	Isthmian League South Central Division	8	United	
Hayle	South West Peninsula League Premier Division West	10	Greens	From St. Piran League West
Haywards Heath Town	Southern Combination League Premier Division	9	Blues	
Heacham	Eastern Counties League Premier Division	9	Magpies	
Heanor Town	United Counties League Premier Division North	9	Lions	
Heather St John's	Midland League Division One	10	Saints	
Heaton Stannington	Northern Premier League Division One East	8	Stan	
Hebburn Town	National League North	6	Hornets	From Northern Premier League Premier
Hedge End Rangers	Wessex League Division One	10	tbc	From Hampshire Premier League Senior
Hednesford Town	National League North	6	Pitmen	From Northern Premier League Premier
Helston Athletic	South West Peninsula League Premier Division West	10	Blues	From Western League Premier (voluntarily demoted)
Hemel Hempstead Town	National League South	6	Tudors	
Hemsworth Miners Welfare	Northern Counties East League Division One	10	Wells	From Sheffield and Hallamshire Co.Senior League Premier
Hendon	Isthmian League South Central Division	8	Greens	
Hereford	National League North	6	Bulls	
Hereford Pegasus	Hellenic League Premier Division	9	Redmen	
Herne Bay	Isthmian League South East Division	8	Bay	
Hertford Heath	Eastern Counties League Division One South	10	tbc	From Hertfordshire Senior County League Premier
Hertford Town	Southern League Division One Central	8	Blues	
Heybridge Swifts	Essex Senior League	9	Swifts	From Isthmian League One North
Highgate United	United Counties League Premier Division South	9	Gate	From Midland League Premier
Highworth Town	Hellenic League Premier Division	9	Worthians	
Hilltop	Combined Counties League Premier Division North	9	tbc	
Hinckley AFC	United Counties League Premier Division North	9	Builders	From United Counties League Premier South
Histon	United Counties League Premier Division South	9	Stutes	
Hitchin Town	Southern League Premier Division Central	7	Canaries	From Southern League One Central
Hoddesdon Town	Eastern Counties League Division One South	10	Lillywhites	
Holbeach United	Eastern Counties League Division One North	10	Tigers	
Holker Old Boys	North West Counties League Division One North	10	Stags	
Holland	Eastern Counties League Division One North	10	Tangerines	
Hollands & Blair	Southern Counties East League Premier Division	9	Blair	
Holmer Green	Spartan South Midlands League Division One	10	Greens	
Holsworthy	South West Peninsula League Premier Division West	10	Kirton	
Holwell Sports	Midland League Division One	10	Sports	From United Counties League One
Holyport	Combined Counties League Premier Division North	9	Villagers	
Honiton Town	South West Peninsula League Premier Division East	10	Hippos	
Horbury Town	Northern Counties East League Premier Division	9	Three Castles	
Horden Community Welfare	Northern League Division One	9	Marras	
Horley Town	Isthmian League South East Division	8	Clarets	From Southern Combination League Premier
Hornchurch	National League	5	Urchins	From National League South
Horndean	Wessex League Premier Division	9	Deans	From Isthmian League One South Central
Horsham	National League South	6	Hornets	
Horsham YM	Southern Combination League Premier Division	9	YM	
Hucknall Town	United Counties League Premier Division North	9	Yellows	
Huddersfield Town	EFL League One	3	Terriers	
Hull City	Premier League	1	Tigers	From EFL Championship
Hullbridge Sports	Essex Senior League	9	Sports	
Hungerford Town	Southern League Division One South	8	Crusaders	From Southern League Premier South
Huntingdon Town	Spartan South Midlands League Division One	10	Croms	
Hutton	Essex Senior League	9	Lillywhites	From Eastern Counties League One South
Hyde United	Northern Premier League Premier Division	7	Tigers	
Hythe & Dibden	Wessex League Premier Division	9	Boatmen	
Hythe Town	Southern Counties East League Division One	10	Cannons	From Southern Counties East League Premier

=== I ===
Club	League/Division	Lvl	Nickname	Change from 2025–26
Ilford	Essex Senior League	9	Foxes	
Ilfracombe Town	South West Peninsula League Premier Division East	10	Bluebirds	
Ilkeston Town	Northern Premier League Premier Division	7	Robins	
Ilkley Town	Northern Counties East League Division One	10	Baht'atters	
Ilminster Town	South West Peninsula League Premier Division East	10	Blues	
Immingham Town	Northern Counties East League Division One	10	Pilgrims	From Lincolnshire League
Infinity	Southern Combination League Division One	10	tbc	
Ingles	Midland League Division One	10	tbc	
Ipswich Town	Premier League	1	Tractor Boys	From EFL Championship
Ipswich Wanderers	Eastern Counties League Premier Division	9	Wanderers	
Irchester United	Spartan South Midlands League Division One	10	Romans	
Irlam	North West Counties League Premier Division	9	Mitchells	
Ivybridge Town	Western League Premier Division	9	Bridgers	

=== J ===
Club	League/Division	Lvl	Nickname	Change from 2025–26
Jarrow	Northern League Division Two	10	tbc	
Jarvis Brook	Southern Combination League Division One	10	Brook	
Jersey Bulls	Isthmian League South Central Division	8	Bulls	From Isthmian League One South East

=== K ===
Club	League/Division	Lvl	Nickname	Change from 2025–26
Keighley Town	Northern Counties East League Premier Division	9	Eagles	New name - formerly Eccleshill United
Kempston Rovers	Spartan South Midlands League Premier Division	9	Walnut Boys	
Kendal Town	Northern League Division One	9	Mintcakes	
Kennington	Southern Counties East League Premier Division	9	Ton	
Kettering Town	Southern League Premier Division Central	7	Poppies	
Keynsham Town	Western League Division One	10	K's	
Kidderminster Harriers	National League	5	Kiddy	From National League North
Kidlington	Combined Counties League Premier Division North	9	Greens	
Kidsgrove Athletic	Northern Premier League Division One West	8	Grove	
Kimberley Miners Welfare	United Counties League Premier Division North	9	Welfare	
Kings Langley	Spartan South Midlands League Premier Division	9	Kings	
King's Lynn Town	National League North	6	Linnets	
Kingstonian	Isthmian League South Central Division	8	K's	
Kinsley Boys	Northern Counties East League Division One	10	tbc	From Cheshire League Premier
Kintbury Rangers	Wessex League Division One	10	Gers	
Kirby Muxloe	Midland League Division One	10	tbc	
Kirkley & Pakefield	Eastern Counties League Premier Division	9	Royals	
Knaphill	Combined Counties League Premier Division South	9	Knappers	
Knaresborough Town	Northern Counties East League Premier Division	9	Boro	
Knowle	United Counties League Premier Division South	9	Robins	From Midland League One

=== L ===
Club	League/Division	Lvl	Nickname	Change from 2025–26
LIV	Northern Counties East League Division One	10	tbc	From Humber Premier League Premier
Lakenheath	Eastern Counties League Premier Division	9	Heath	
Lancaster City	Northern Premier League Premier Division	7	Dolly Blues	
Lancing	Southern Combination League Premier Division	9	Lancers	
Langford	Spartan South Midlands League Division One	10	Reds	
Langley	Combined Counties League Division One	10	MerryMakers	
Larkfield & New Hythe Wanderers	Southern Counties East League Premier Division	9	Wanderers	
Larkhall Athletic	Southern League Division One South	8	Larks	
Launceston	South West Peninsula League Premier Division West	10	Clarets	
Laverstock & Ford	Wessex League Premier Division	9	Lavvy / Bulldogs	
Leamington	Southern League Premier Division Central	7	Brakes	From National League North
Leatherhead	Isthmian League Premier Division	7	Tanners	From Isthmian League One South Central
Leeds UFCA	Northern Counties East League Division One	10	tbc	
Leeds United	Premier League	1	Whites	
Leek Town	Northern Premier League Premier Division	7	Blues	
Leicester City	EFL League One	3	Foxes	From EFL Championship
Leicester Nirvana	United Counties League Premier Division North	9	tbc	From United Counties League Premier South
Leicester St. Andrews	Midland League Division One	10	Saints	
Leighton Town Reserves	Spartan South Midlands League Division One	10	Reds	
Leighton Town	Southern League Premier Division Central	7	Reds	From Southern League One Central
Leiston	Southern League Premier Division Central	7	Blues	
Letchworth Garden City Eagles	Spartan South Midlands League Division One	10	Eagles	
Leverstock Green	Southern League Division One Central	8	Green	
Lewes	Isthmian League Premier Division	7	Rooks	
Lewisham Borough	Southern Counties East League Division One	10	Boro	
Leyton Orient	EFL League One	3	O's	
Lichfield City	Northern Premier League Division One West	8	tbc	From Northern Premier League One Midlands
Lincoln City	EFL Championship	2	Imps	From EFL League One
Lincoln United	Northern Premier League Division One East	8	Whites	
Lingfield	Southern Combination League Premier Division	9	Lingers	
Liskeard Athletic	Western League Premier Division	9	Blues	From South West Peninsula League Premier West
Litherland REMYCA	North West Counties League Premier Division	9	REMY	
Little Common	Southern Combination League Premier Division	9	Green Lane Boys	
Little Oakley	Isthmian League North Division	8	Acorns	From Essex Senior League
Littlehampton Town	Isthmian League South Central Division	8	Marigolds	
Liverpool	Premier League	1	Reds	
Liversedge	Northern Premier League Division One East	8	Sedge	From Northern Counties East League Premier
London Fennecs	Eastern Counties League Division One South	10	Fennecs	From Middlesex County League Premier
London Harts United	Eastern Counties League Division One South	10	tbc	From Essex Alliance Premier
London Samurai Rovers	Combined Counties League Division One	10	tbc	
Long Eaton United	Northern Premier League Division One Midlands	8	Blues	
Long Melford	Eastern Counties League Division One North	10	Villagers	
Longlevens	Hellenic League Premier Division	9	Levens	
Longridge Town	North West Counties League Premier Division	9	Ridge	
Longwell Green Sports	Western League Division One	10	Green	
Lordswood	Southern Counties East League Division One	10	Lords	
Loughborough Students	Northern Premier League Division One Midlands	8	Scholars	
Louth Town	United Counties League Division One	10	White Wolves	From Northern Counties East League One
Lower Breck	Northern Premier League Division One West	8	tbc	
Lowestoft Town	Isthmian League North Division	8	Trawler Boys	
Loxwood	Southern Combination League Premier Division	10	Magpies	
Ludlow	Hellenic League Division One	10	tbc	
Luton Town	EFL League One	3	Hatters	
Lutterworth Athletic	Midland League Division One	10	Athletic	
Lutterworth Town	United Counties League Premier Division South	9	Swifts	
Lydd Town	Southern Counties East League Division One	10	Lydders	
Lydney Town	Hellenic League Division One	10	Town	From Hellenic League Premier
Lye Town	Midland League Premier Division	9	Flyers	
Lymington Town	Wessex League Division One	10	Lynnets	
Lymore Gardens	Eastern Counties League Division One South	10	tbc	

=== M ===
Club	League/Division	Lvl	Nickname	Change from 2025–26
MSB Woolton	North West Counties League Division One North	10	tbc	From North West Counties League One South
Maccabi London Lions	Southern League Division One Central	8	Lions	
Macclesfield	National League North	6	Silkmen	
Maghull	North West Counties League Division One North	10	tbc	
Maidenhead Town	Combined Counties League Division One	10	tbc	From Thames Valley Premier League Premier
Maidenhead United	National League South	6	Magpies	
Maidstone United	National League South	6	Stones	
Maine Road	North West Counties League Division One North	10	Sky Blues	
Maldon & Tiptree	Isthmian League Premier Division	7	Jammers	From Isthmian League One North
Malmesbury Victoria	Hellenic League Premier Division	9	Vics	From Hellenic League One
Maltby Main	United Counties League Division One	10	Miners	From Northern Counties East League One
Malvern Town	Southern League Premier Division South	7	Hillsiders	From Isthmian League One South South
Manchester City	Premier League	1	Citizens	
Manchester United	Premier League	1	Red Devils	
Mangotsfield United	Hellenic League Premier Division	9	Field	
Mansfield Town	EFL League One	3	Stags	
Marcelona	Eastern Counties League Division One South	10	tbc	New name - formerly Newbury Forest
March Town United	Eastern Counties League Premier Division	9	Hares	From United Counties League Premier South
Margate	Isthmian League South Central Division	8	Gate	
Marine	National League North	6	Mariners	
Market Drayton Town	North West Counties League Division One South	10	Gingerbread Men	
Marlow	Southern League Division One Central	8	Blues	
Marske United	Northern League Division One	9	Seasiders	
Matlock Town	Northern Premier League Division One East	8	Gladiators	
May & Baker	Eastern Counties League Division One South	10	Bakers	
Melksham Town	Southern League Division One South	8	Town	
Mendip Broadwalk	Western League Division One	10	tbc	
Merstham	Isthmian League South East Division	8	Moatsiders	
Merthyr Town (Wales)	National League North	6	Martyrs	
Metropolitan Police	Combined Counties League Premier Division South	9	Met	From Isthmian League One South Central
Mickleover	Northern Premier League Division One Midlands	8	Sports	
Middlesbrough	EFL Championship	2	Boro	
Middlezoy Rovers	South West Peninsula League Premier Division East	10	Zoy	
Midhurst & Easebourne	Southern Combination League Premier Division	9	Stags	
Mildenhall Town	Eastern Counties League Premier Division	9	Hall	From Isthmian League One North
Mile Oak	Southern Combination League Division One	10	Oak	
Millbrook (Cornwall)	South West Peninsula League Premier Division West	10	Magpies	
Millbrook (Hampshire)	Wessex League Premier Division	9	Dockers	
Millwall	EFL Championship	2	Lions	
Milton Keynes	EFL League One	3	Dons	From EFL League Two
Milton Keynes Irish	Southern League Division One Central	8	Robins	
Minster	Southern Counties East League Division One	10	tbc	From Kent County League Premier
Molesey	Combined Counties League Division One	10	Moles	
Moneyfields	Isthmian League South Central	8	Moneys	
Morecambe	National League North	6	Shrimps	From National League
Morpeth Town	Northern Premier League Division One East	8	Highwaymen	From Northern Premier League Premier
Mossley	Northern Premier League Division One West	8	Lilywhites	
Moulton	United Counties League Premier Division South	9	Magpies	
Mousehole	South West Peninsula League Premier Division West	10	Seagulls	From Southern League One South (voluntarily demoted)
Mulbarton Wanderers	Isthmian League North Division	8	tbc	From Eastern Counties League Premier

=== N ===
Club	League/Division	Lvl	Nickname	Change from 2025–26
NW London	Eastern Counties League Division One South	10	Gorillas	
Nailsea United	Western League Division One	10	tbc	From Somerset County League Premier
Nantwich Town	Northern Premier League Division One West	8	Dabbers	
Needham Market	Southern League Premier Division Central	7	Marketmen	
Needham Market Reserves	Eastern Counties League Division One North	10	Marketmen	
Nelson	North West Counties League Premier Division	9	Admirals	From North West Counties League One North
Netherton United	Eastern Counties League Division One North	10	tbc	From Peterborough and District League Premier
New Bradwell St Peter	Spartan South Midlands League Division One	10	Saint Peters	From Spartan South Midlands League Two
New Mills	North West Counties League Division One South	10	Millers	
New Milton Town	Wessex League Division One	10	Linnets	From Wessex League Premier
Newark Town	United Counties League Premier Division North	9	Blue Submarine	
Newcastle Benfield	Northern League Division One	9	Lions	
Newcastle Blue Star	Northern League Division One	9	Star	
Newcastle Town	Northern Premier League Division One West	8	Castle	
Newcastle United	Premier League	1	Magpies	
Newcastle University	Northern League Division Two	10	tbc	
Newent Town	Hellenic League Division One	10	Daffs	
Newhaven	Southern Combination League Premier Division	9	Dockers	
Newmarket Town	Isthmian League North Division	8	Jockeys	
Newmarket Town Reserves	Eastern Counties League Division One North	10	Jockeys	From Cambridgeshire County League Premier
Newport (IOW)	Wessex League Division One	10	Ports	
Newport County (Wales)	EFL League Two	4	Exiles	
Newport Pagnell Town	Spartan South Midlands League Premier Division	9	Swans	From United Counties League Premier South
Newquay	Western League Premier Division	9	Peppermints	
Newton Abbot Spurs	South West Peninsula League Premier Division East	10	Spurs	
Newton Aycliffe	Northern League Division One	9	Newts	From Northern Premier League One East
North Ferriby	Northern Premier League Division One East	8	Villagers	
North Greenford United	Combined Counties League Premier Division North	9	Blues	
North Leigh	Combined Counties League Premier Division North	9	Yellows	
North Shields	Northern League Division One	9	Robins	
Northallerton Town	Northern League Division One	9	Town	
Northampton ON Chenecks	United Counties League Premier Division South	9	Chenecks	
Northampton Sileby Rangers	United Counties League Premier Division South	9	Rangers	
Northampton Town	EFL League Two	4	Cobblers	From EFL League One
Northfield Town	Midland League Division One	10	Town	From Midland League Two
Northwich Victoria	Midland League Premier Division	9	Vics	
Northwood	Combined Counties League Premier Division North	9	Woods	From Southern League One Central
Norwich City	EFL Championship	2	Canaries	
Norwich United	Eastern Counties League Division One North	10	Planters	From Anglian Combination Premier
Nottingham Forest	Premier League	1	Forest	
Notts County	EFL League One	3	Magpies	From EFL League Two
Nuneaton Town	Northern Premier League Division One Midlands	8	Boro	From United Counties League Premier South

=== O ===
Club	League/Division	Lvl	Nickname	Change from 2025–26
Oakwood	Southern Combination League Division One	10	Oaks	
Odd Down	Western League Division One	10	Down	
Okehampton Argyle	South West Peninsula League Premier Division East	10	tbc	
Oldham Athletic	EFL League Two	4	Latics	
Oldland Abbotonians	Western League Premier Division	9	O's	
Ossett United	Northern Premier League Division One East	8	Reds	
Oxford City	National League North	6	City	
Oxford United	EFL League One	3	U's	From EFL Championship
Oxhey Jets	Combined Counties League Division One	10	Jets	

=== P ===
Club	League/Division	Lvl	Nickname	Change from 2025–26
PFC Victoria London	Combined Counties League Division One	10	tbc	
Padiham	Northern Premier League Division One West	8	Storks	From North West Counties League Premier
Pagham	Southern Combination League Premier Division	9	Lions	
Park View	Northern League Division Two	10	tbc	New name - formerly Chester-le-Street United
Parkgate	Northern Counties East League Premier Division	9	Steelmen	
Paulton Rovers	Southern League Division One South	8	Rovers	From Western League Premier
Peacehaven & Telscombe	Isthmian League South East Division	8	Magpies	From Southern Combination League Premier
Penistone Church	Northern Counties East League Premier Division	9	tbc	
Penn & Tylers Green	Combined Counties League Premier Division North	9	Penn	From Combined Counties League One
Penrith	Northern League Division One	9	Blues	
Penzance	South West Peninsula League Premier Division West	10	Magpies	
Pershore Town	Hellenic League Premier Division	9	Town	
Peterborough Sports	Southern League Premier Division Central	7	Sports	From National League North
Peterborough United	EFL League One	3	Posh	
Petersfield Town	Wessex League Premier Division	9	Rams	
Petts Wood & Holmesdale	Southern Counties East League Premier Division	9	Dalers	New name - formerly Holmesdale
Phoenix Sports	Southern Counties East League Premier Division	9	tbc	
Pickering Town	Northern Counties East League Premier Division	9	Pikes	
Pinchbeck United	United Counties League Division One	10	Knights	
Pinxton	United Counties League Division One	10	Miners	
Plymouth Argyle	EFL League One	3	Pilgrims	
Plymouth Parkway	Southern League Premier Division South	7	Parkway	
Pontefract Collieries	Northern Premier League Division One East	8	Colls	
Poole Town	Southern League Premier Division South	7	Dolphins	
Port Vale	EFL League Two	4	Valiants	From EFL League One
Portishead Town	Western League Premier Division	9	Posset	From Southern League One South
Portland United	Southern League Division One South	8	Blues	From Wessex League Premier
Portsmouth	EFL Championship	2	Pompey	
Potters Bar Town	Southern League Division One Central	8	Scholars	From Isthmian League Premier
Potton United	Spartan South Midlands League Premier Division	9	Royals	
Prescot Cables	Northern Premier League Division One West	8	Tigers	From Northern Premier League Premier
Preston North End	EFL Championship	2	Lilywhites	
Prestwich Heys	North West Counties League Premier Division	9	Heys	
Prudhoe Youth Club	Northern League Division Two	10	tbc	
Punjab United	Isthmian League South East Division	8	Punjab	From Southern Counties East League Premier

=== Q ===
Club	League/Division	Lvl	Nickname	Change from 2025–26
Queens Park Rangers	EFL Championship	2	Hoops	
Quorn	Northern Premier League Premier Division	7	Vegetarians	From Southern League One Central

=== R ===
Club	League/Division	Lvl	Nickname	Change from 2025–26
Racing Club Warwick	Southern League Premier Division Central	7	Racers	From Northern Premier League One Midlands
Radcliffe	National League North	6	Boro	
Radford	United Counties League Division One	10	Pheasants	
Radstock Town	Western League Division One	10	Miners	
Ramsbottom United	North West Counties League Premier Division	9	Rams	
Ramsgate	Isthmian League Premier Division	7	Rams	
Rayleigh Town	Eastern Counties League Division One South	10	tbc	
Rayners Lane	Combined Counties League Premier Division North	9	Lane	From Southern League One Central
Raynes Park Vale	Isthmian League South Central	8	Vale	
Reading City	Combined Counties League Premier Division North	9	Moor	
Reading	EFL League One	3	Royals	
Real Bedford	Southern League Premier Division Central	7	B's	
Redbridge	Isthmian League Division One North	8	Motormen	
Redcar Athletic	Northern Premier League Premier Division	7	Steelmen	From Northern Premier League One East
Redcar Town	Northern League Division One	9	tbc	From Northern League Two
Redditch Borough	Hellenic League Division One	10	Borough	
Redditch United	Southern League Premier Division Central	7	Reds	
Redhill	Combined Counties League Premier Division South	9	Lobsters	
Reigate Priory	Southern Combination League Division One	10	Priory	
Retford	Northern Counties East League Premier Division	9	Choughs	From United Counties League One
Retford United	United Counties League Premier Division	9	Badgers	From United Counties League One
Ringmer	Southern Combination League Division One	10	Blues	
Ringwood Town	Wessex League Division One	10	Worms	
Risborough Rangers	Spartan South Midlands League Premier Division	9	Rangers	
Rising Ballers Kensington	Combined Counties League Division One	10	tbc	
Rochdale	EFL League Two	4	Dale	From National League
Rochester United	Southern Counties East League Division One	10	Spartans	
Roffey	Southern Combination League Premier Division	9	Bears	
Roman Glass St George	Hellenic League Premier Division	9	Glass	
Romford	Essex Senior League	9	Boro'	
Romsey Town	Wessex League Division One	10	Town	
Romulus	Midland League Premier Division	9	Roms	
Rossington Main	Northern Counties East League Premier Division	9	Main	
Rotherham United	EFL League Two	4	Millers	From EFL League One
Rothwell Corinthians	Spartan South Midlands League Division One	10	Corinthians	
Route One Rovers	Northern Counties East League Division One	10	tbc	
Royal Wootton Bassett Town	Hellenic League Premier Division	9	Bassett	
Royston Town	Southern League Division One Central	8	Crows	From Southern League Premier Central
Royston Town Reserves	Spartan South Midlands League Division One	10	Crows	
Rugby Borough	Northern Premier League Division One Midlands	8	tbc	
Rugby Town	United Counties League Premier Division South	9	Valley	From Northern Premier League One Midlands
Runcorn Linnets	Northern Premier League Division One West	8	Linnets	
Runcorn Town	Midland League Premier Division	9	Town	From North West Counties League One South
Rushall Olympic	Southern League Premier Division Central	7	Pics	From Northern Premier League Premier
Rushden & Higham United	Spartan South Midlands League Division One	10	Lankies	
Rusthall	Southern Counties East League Premier Division	9	Rustics	
Ryton & Crawcrook Albion	Northern League Division Two	10	Albion	

=== S ===
Club	League/Division	Lvl	Nickname	Change from 2025–26
SE Dons	Southern Counties East League Premier Division	9	Dons	From Southern Counties East League One, also new name - formerly Forest Hill Park
Saffron Dynamo	Midland League Division One	10	Saff	
Saffron Walden Town	Essex Senior League	9	Bloods	
Salford City	EFL League Two	4	Ammies	
Salisbury	National League South	6	Whites	
Saltash United	Western League Premier Division	9	Ashes	
Saltdean United	Southern Combination League Division One	10	Tigers	
Sandbach United	North West Counties League Division One South	10	Ramblers	
Sandhurst Town	Wessex League Division One	10	Fizzers	From Combined Counties League One
Sandiacre Town	United Counties League Division One	10	Saints	
Sawbridgeworth Town	Spartan South Midlands League Premier Division	9	Robins	
Scarborough Athletic	National League North	6	Seadogs	
Scunthorpe United	National League	5	Iron	
Seaford Town	Southern Combination League Premier Division	9	Badgers	
Seaham Red Star	Northern League Division Two	10	Star	
Seaton Carew	Northern League Division Two	10	tbc	From Wearside League One
Selby Town	Northern Counties East League Division One	10	Robins	
Selsey	Southern Combination League Division One	10	Blues	
Selston	United Counties League Division One	10	Parisioners	From Central Midlands Alliance South
Sevenoaks Town	Isthmian League South East Division	8	Oaks	
Shaftesbury	Southern League Division One South	8	Rockies	
Sharpness	Hellenic League Division One	10	tbc	From Gloucestershire County League
Shawbury United	North West Counties League Division One South	10	tbc	
Sheerwater	Combined Counties League Premier Division South	9	Sheers	
Sheffield	United Counties League Premier Division North	9	Club	From Northern Counties East League Premier
Sheffield United	EFL Championship	2	Blades	
Sheffield Wednesday	EFL League One	3	Owls	From EFL Championship
Sheppey Sports	Southern Counties East League Division One	10	Paperboys	
Sheppey United	Isthmian League South Central Division	8	Ites	
Shepshed Dynamo	Northern Premier League Division One Midlands	8	Dynamo	
Shepton Mallet	Western League Premier Division	9	Mallet	
Sherborne Town	Wessex League Premier Division	9	Zebras	
Sherwood Colliery	United Counties League Premier Division North	9	Parisioners	
Shifnal Town	Northern Premier League Division One West	8	Reds	
Shildon	Northern League Division One	9	Railwaymen	
Shirebrook Town	United Counties League Division One	10	tbc	
Shirehampton	Western League Division One	10	tbc	
Sholing	Southern League Premier Division South	7	Boatmen	
Shoreham	Southern Combination League Division One	10	Musselmen	From Southern Combination League Premier
Shortwood United	Hellenic League Division One	10	Woods	
Shrewsbury Town	EFL League Two	4	Shrews	
Sidmouth Town	Western League Premier Division	9	Vikings	
Silsden	Northern Premier League Division One East	8	Cobbydalers	
Sittingbourne	Isthmian League South East Division	8	Brickies	
Skegness Town	United Counties League Premier Division North	9	Lilywhites	
Sleaford Town	United Counties League Division One	10	Greens	
Slimbridge	Southern League Division One South	8	Swans	From Hellenic League Premier
Slough Town	National League South	6	Rebels	
Snodland Town	Southern Counties East League Premier Division	9	tbc	
Soham Town Rangers	Eastern Counties League Premier Division	9	Greens	
Solihull Moors	National League	5	Moors	
Soul Tower Hamlets	Essex Senior League	9	tbc	
South Leeds	Northern Counties East League Division One	10	tbc	
South Liverpool	North West Counties League Premier Division	9	South	
South Normanton Athletic	United Counties League Division One	10	Shiners	
South Park	Isthmian League South East Division	8	Sparks	From Southern League One Central
South Shields	National League North	6	Mariners	
Southall	Isthmian League South Central Division	8	tbc	
Southampton	EFL Championship	2	Saints	
Southend Manor	Eastern Counties League Division One South	10	Manor	
Southend United	National League	5	Shrimpers	
Southport	National League North	6	Sandgrounders	
Southwell City	United Counties League Division One	10	Bramleys	
Spalding United	National League North	6	Tulips	From Southern League Premier Central
Spartans Youth	Combined Counties League Division One	10	tbc	
Spelthorne Sports	Combined Counties League Division One	10	Spelly	
Spennymoor Town	National League North	6	Moors	
Sport London e Benfica	Combined Counties League Division One	10	Eagles	
Sporting Bengal United	Essex Senior League	9	Bengal Tigers	
Sporting Club Inkberrow	Southern League Division One South	8	Eagles	
Sporting Club Thamesmead	Southern Counties East League Division One	10	Acres	
Sporting Khalsa	Midland League Premier Division	9	Sporting	From Northern Premier League One West
Squires Gate	North West Counties League Division One North	10	Gate	
St Albans City	Isthmian League Premier Division	7	Saints	
St Blazey	Western League Premier Division	9	Green & Blacks	
St Ives Town	Northern Premier League Division One Midlands	8	Saints	From Southern League Premier Central
St Neots Town	United Counties League Premier Division South	9	Saints	From Northern Premier League One Midlands
St Mawgan	South West Peninsula League Premier Division West	10	tbc	From St. Piran League East
Stafford Rangers	Northern Premier League Division One West	8	Rangers	
Stafford Town	North West Counties League Division One South	10	Reds	
Staines & Lammas (Middlesex)	Combined Counties League Division One	10	Lammas	
Stalybridge Celtic	Northern Premier League Division One West	8	Celts	
Stamford	Southern League Premier Division Central	7	Daniels	
Stansfeld	Southern Counties East League Division One	10	Palace	From Southern Counties East League Premier
Stansted	Eastern Counties League Division One South	10	Blues	
Stanway Rovers	Isthmian League Premier Division	7	Rovers	From Isthmian League One North
Stapenhill	Midland League Division One	10	Swans	
Stapleford Town	United Counties League Division One	10	Saxons	
Staplehurst Monarchs	Southern Counties East League Division One	10	Monarchs	
Staveley Miners Welfare	United Counties League Division One	10	Welfare	
Steeton	North West Counties League Division One North	10	Chevrons	
Stevenage	EFL League One	3	Boro	
Steyning Town	Isthmian League South East Division	8	Barrowmen	From Southern Combination League Premier
Sticker	South West Peninsula League Premier Division West	10	Ashes	
Stockport County	EFL League One	3	Hatters	
Stockport Georgians	Midland League Premier Division	9	Georgians	From North West Counties League One South
Stocksbridge Park Steels	Northern Premier League Division One East	8	Steels	From Northern Premier League Premier
Stockton Town	Northern Premier League Premier Division	7	Anchors	
Stoke City	EFL Championship	2	Potters	
Stoke Gabriel & Torbay Police	South West Peninsula League Premier Division East	10	Bees	
Stokesley Sports Club	Northern League Division Two	10	tbc	From North Riding League Premier
Stone Old Alleynians	Midland League Premier Division	9	tbc	
Stonehouse Town	Hellenic League Division One	10	Magpies	
Stotfold	Southern League Division One Central	8	Eagles	
Stotfold Reserves	Spartan South Midlands League Division One	10	Eagles	
Stourbridge	Southern League Premier Division Central	7	Glassboys	
Stourport Swifts	Hellenic League Premier Division	9	Swifts	From Midland League Premier
Stowmarket Town	Eastern Counties League Premier Division	9	Old Black & Golds	
Stratford Town	Southern League Premier Division Central	7	Town	
Street	Western League Premier Division	9	Cobblers	
Studley	Hellenic League Division One	10	Bees	From Midland League Premier
Sturminster Newton United	Wessex League Premier Division	9	Cherries	From Western League One
Sunderland	Premier League	1	Black Cats	
Sunderland Ryhope CA	Northern League Division Two	10	CA	
Sutton Athletic	Southern Counties East League Premier Division	9	tbc	
Sutton Coldfield Town	Northern Premier League Division One Midlands	8	Royals	
Sutton Common Rovers	Combined Counties League Premier Division South	9	Commoners	
Sutton United	National League	5	U's	
Sutton United (Birmingham)	Midland League Premier Division	9	tbc	From Midland League One
Swallownest	United Counties League Division One	10	Swall	From Northern Counties East League One
Swansea City (Wales)	EFL Championship	2	Swans	
Swindon Supermarine	Southern League Division One South	8	Marine	
Swindon Supermarine Reserves	Hellenic League Division One	10	Marine	From Wiltshire Senior League Premier
Swindon Town	EFL League Two	4	Robins	

=== T ===
Club	League/Division	Lvl	Nickname	Change from 2025–26
Tadcaster Albion	Northern Counties East League Premier Division	9	Brewers	
Tadley Calleva	Combined Counties League Premier Division South	9	Tadders	
Takeley	Isthmian League North Division	8	tbc	
Tamworth	National League	5	Lambs	
Taunton Town	Southern League Premier Division South	7	Peacocks	
Tavistock	Western League Premier Division	9	Lambs	From Southern League One South
Teignmouth	South West Peninsula League Premier Division East	10	Teigns	
Telford Town	North West Counties League Division One South	10	Ams	
Thackley	Northern Counties East League Premier Division	9	Dennyboys	
Thame United	Southern League Division One Central	8	United	
Thatcham Town	Combined Counties League Premier Division North	9	Kingfishers	From Combined Counties League Premier South
Thetford Town	Eastern Counties League Premier Division	9	Brecklanders	
Thornaby	Northern League Division One	9	Blues	
Thornbury Town	Hellenic League Premier Division	9	tbc	
Thornton Cleveleys	North West Counties League Division One North	10	tbc	
Three Bridges	Isthmian League Premier Division	7	Bridges	From Isthmian League One South East
Tilbury	Isthmian League North Division	8	Dockers	
Tiverton Town	Southern League Division One South	8	Yellows	From Southern League Premier South
Tividale	Midland League Premier Division	9	Dale	
Tonbridge Angels	National League South	6	Angels	
Tooting & Mitcham United	Combined Counties League Premier Division South	9	Terrors	
Tooting Bec	Southern Counties East League Division One	10	Bec	
Torpoint Athletic	Western League Premier Division	9	Gold & Black Army	
Torquay United	National League South	6	Gulls	
Torridgeside	South West Peninsula League Premier Division East	10	T-Side	
Torrington	South West Peninsula League Premier Division East	10	Super Greens	
Tottenham Hotspur	Premier League	1	Lilywhites	
Totton & Eling	Wessex League Division One	10	Millers	
Tow Law Town	Northern League Division Two	10	Lawyers	
Trafford	North West Counties League Premier Division	9	North	From Northern Premier League One West
Tranmere Rovers	EFL League Two	4	Rovers	
Tring Athletic	Spartan South Midlands League Premier Division	9	Athletic	
Truro City	National League South	6	White Tigers	From National League
Tuffley Rovers	Hellenic League Premier Division	9	Rovers	
Tunbridge Wells	Southern Counties East League Premier Division	9	Wells	

=== U ===
Club	League/Division	Lvl	Nickname	Change from 2025–26
University of Exeter	South West Peninsula League Premier Division East	10	tbc	From Dorset Premier League
Uppermill	North West Counties League Division One North	10	tbc	New club
Uttoxeter Town	Midland League Premier Division	9	Town	
Uxbridge	Southern League Premier Division South	7	Reds	

=== V ===
Club	League/Division	Lvl	Nickname	Change from 2025–26
Vauxhall Motors	Northern Premier League Division One West	8	Motormen	
Virginia Water	Combined Counties League Premier Division South	9	Waters	From Combined Counties League Premier North

=== W ===
Club	League/Division	Lvl	Nickname	Change from 2025–26
Wadebridge Town	South West Peninsula League Premier Division West	10	Bridgers	
Wakefield	Northern Counties East League Division One	10	Wakey	
Wallingford & Crowmarsh	Combined Counties League Premier Division North	9	Waters	
Walsall	EFL League Two	4	Saddlers	
Walsham-le-Willows	Eastern Counties League Premier Division	9	Willows	
Waltham Abbey	Southern League Division One Central	8	Abbotts	From Isthmian League One North
Walthamstow	Isthmian League North Division	8	Stags	
Walton & Hersham	National League South	6	Swans	From Southern League Premier South
Wantage Town	Hellenic League Division One	10	Alfredians	
Ware	Southern League Division One Central	8	Blues	
Warminster Town	Western League Division One	10	Reds & Blacks	
Warrington Rylands 1906	Northern Premier League Premier Division	7	Blues	
Warrington Town	Northern Premier League Premier Division	7	Wire	
Watford	EFL Championship	2	Hornets	
Wealdstone	National League	5	Stones	
Wednesfield	North West Counties League Division One South	10	Cotttagers	From Midland League One
Welling Town	Southern Counties East League Division One	10	Boots	
Welling United	Isthmian League Premier Division	7	Wings	
Wellingborough Town	Northern Premier League Division One Midlands	8	Cornies	
Wellingborough Whitworth	Spartan South Midlands League Division One	10	Flourmen	
Wellington (Somerset)	Western League Premier Division	9	Tangerines	
Wells City	Western League Division One	10	tbc	
Welton Rovers	Western League Division One	10	Rovers	
Welwyn Garden City	Southern League Division One Central	8	Citizens	
Wembley	Combined Counties League Premier Division One	10	Lions	
Wendron United	South West Peninsula League Premier Division West	10	Dron	
West Auckland Town	Northern Premier League Division One East	8	West	From Northern League One
West Bridgford	United Counties League Division One	10	tbc	
West Bromwich Albion	EFL Championship	2	Baggies	
West Didsbury & Chorlton	Midland League Premier Division	9	West	From North West Counties League Premier
West Essex	Essex Senior League	9	tbc	
West Ham United	EFL Championship	2	Irons	From Premier League
Westbury United	Southern League Division One South	8	White Horse Men	
Westfield (Surrey)	Isthmian League South Central Division	8	Field	
Westfield (Sussex)	Southern Combination League Division One	10	Westies	From Mid Sussex League Premier
Westfields	Hellenic League Premier Division	9	Fields	
Weston-super-Mare	National League South	6	Seagulls	
Westside	Combined Counties League Division One	10	tbc	
Weymouth	Southern League Division One South	8	Terras	From Southern League Premier South
Whickham	Northern League Division One	9	Home Guard	
Whitby Town	Northern Premier League Premier Division	7	Seasiders	
Whitchurch Alport	Midland League Premier Division	9	Alport	
Whitchurch United	Wessex League Division One	10	Jam Boys	
White Ensign	Essex Senior League	9	tbc	
Whitehawk	Isthmian League Premier Division	7	Hawks	
Whitley Bay	Northern League Division One	9	Seahorses	
Whitstable Town	Isthmian League South East Division	8	Oystermen	From Southern Counties East League Premier
Whittlesey Athletic	Eastern Counties League Division One North	10	tbc	
Wick	Southern Combination League Premier Division	9	Wickers	
Widnes Town	North West Counties League Division One South	10	tbc	New club
Wigan Athletic	EFL League One	3	Latics	
Willand Rovers	Southern League Division One South	8	Rovers	
Wimborne Town	Southern League Premier Division South	7	Magpies	
Wincanton Town	Wessex League Premier Division	9	Winkys	
Winchester City	Isthmian League South Central Division	8	Citizens	From Southern League One South
Windsor & Eton	Isthmian League South Central Division	8	Royalists	From Combined Counties League Premier North
Wingate & Finchley	Isthmian League Premier Division	7	Blues	
Winsford United	Midland League Premier Division	9	Blues	
Winslow United	Southern League Division One Central	8	Ploughmen	From Spartan South Midlands League Premier
Winterton Rangers	Northern Counties East League Division One	10	Rangers	
Wisbech Town	Eastern Counties League Premier Division	9	Fenmen	From United Counties League Premier North
Witham Town	Isthmian League North Division	8	Town	
Witton Albion	Northern Premier League Division One West	8	Albs	
Wivenhoe Town	Eastern Counties League Division One North	10	Dragons	
Woking	National League	5	Cardinals	
Wokingham Town	Combined Counties League Premier Division North	9	Satsumas	
Wolverhampton Casuals	North West Counties League Division One South	10	Cassies	
Wolverhampton Wanderers	EFL Championship	2	Wolves	From Premier League
Wombwell Town	Northern Counties East League Division One	10	Wellers	From Northern Counties East League Premier
Woodbridge Town	Eastern Counties League Premier Division	9	Woodpeckers	
Woodford Town	Essex Senior League	9	Woods	
Woodford United	Spartan South Midlands League Division One	10	Reds	From Hellenic League One
Woodley United	Combined Counties League Division One	10	Kestrels	
Worcester City	Southern League Premier Division Central	7	Dragons	
Worcester Raiders	Southern League Division One South	8	Raiders	From Hellenic League Premier
Workington	Northern Premier League Premier Division	7	Reds	
Worksop Town	National League North	6	Tigers	
Wormley Rovers	Spartan South Midlands League Premier Division	9	Worms	
Worsbrough Bridge Athletic	Northern Counties East League Premier Division	9	Bridge	From Northern Counties East League One
Worthing	National League	5	Rebels	From National League South
Worthing United	Southern Combination League Division One	10	Mavericks	
Wrexham (Wales)	EFL Championship	2	Dragons	
Wroxham	Isthmian League North Division	8	Yachtsmen	
Wroxham Reserves	Eastern Counties League Division One North	10	Yachtsmen	
Wycombe Wanderers	EFL League One	3	Chairboys	
Wythenshawe	Northern Premier League Division One West	8	Ammies	From North West Counties League Premier
Wythenshawe Town	Midland League Premier Division	9	tbc	From Northern Premier League One West

=== Y ===
Club	League/Division	Lvl	Nickname	Change from 2025–26
Yarm & Eaglescliffe	Northern League Division One	9	tbc	From Northern League Two
Yate Town	Southern League Premier Division South	7	Bluebells	
Yateley United	Combined Counties League Premier Division South	9	tbc	From Wessex League One
Yaxley	United Counties League Premier Division South	9	Cuckoos	
Yeovil Town	National League	5	Glovers	
York City	EFL League Two	4	Minstermen	From National League

=== Clubs in levels 1–10 last season ===
Club	2025–26 League/Division	Lvl	Nickname	2026–27 League/Division	Lvl
AFC Dunstable	Southern League Division One Central	8	Ods	Club merged into Dunstable	-
AFC Uckfield Town	Southern Combination League Division One	10	Oaks	Relegated to Mid Sussex League Premier	11
Allexton & New Parks	Midland League Division One	10	tbc	Resigned - no current league	-
Barkingside	Eastern Counties League Division One South	10	Sky Blues	Relegated to Essex Alliance League Senior	11
Blackfield & Langley	Wessex League Division One	10	Watersiders	Relegated to Hampshire Premier League Senior	11
Brighouse Town	Northern Premier League Division One East	8	Town	Resigned - joined West Yorkshire League One	12
British Airways	Combined Counties League Premier Division North	9	tbc	Club folded	-
Chalfont St Peter	Combined Counties League Division One	10	Saints	Relegated to Thames Valley Premier League Premier	11
Cheddar	Western League Division One	10	Cheesemen	Relegated to Somerset County League Premier	11
Chessington & Hook United	Southern Counties East League Division One	10	Blues	Relegated to Surrey Premier County League Premier	11
City of Liverpool	North West Counties League Premier Division	9	Purps	Relegated to Liverpool Premier League Premier	11
Copthorne	Southern Combination League Division One	10	tbc	Relegated to Southern Combination League Two	11
Dunstable Town	Spartan South Midlands League Premier Division	9	Blues	Club merged into Dunstable	-
Esh Winning & Deerness Valley	Northern League Division Two	10	Stags	Relegated to Wearside League Premier	11
Farsley Celtic	Northern Counties East League Premier Division	9	Villagers	Club folded	-
FC Romania	Eastern Counties League Division One South	10	Wolves	Club folded	-
Glasshoughton Welfare	Northern Counties East League Division One	10	Welfare	Relegated to West Yorkshire League Premier	11
Haughmond	North West Counties League Division One South	10	Academicals	Relegated to Shropshire County League Premier	11
Haverhill Borough	Eastern Counties League Division One North	10	tbc	Resigned - no current league	-
Hengrove Athletic	Western League Division One	10	Grove	Relegated to Somerset County League Premier	11
Hillingdon Borough	Combined Counties League Division One	10	Hillmen	Club folded	-
Kings Park Rangers	Eastern Counties League Division One North	10	tbc	Club folded	-
Leiston U23s	Eastern Counties League Division One North	10	Blues	Relegated to Suffolk & Ipswich League Premier	11
London Colney	Spartan South Midlands League Division One	10	Blueboys	Relegated to Spartan South Midlands League Two	11
Long Buckby	Spartan South Midlands League Division One	10	Bucks	Resigned - joined Northamptonshire Combination League Premier	11
Melton Town	United Counties League Premier Division North	9	tbc	Resigned - joined Leicestershire Senior League Premier	11
Milton United	Combined Counties League Premier Division North	9	Miltonians	Resigned - joined Oxfordshire Senior League Premier	11
Nailsea & Tickenham	Western League Premier Division	9	Seamen	Resigned - no current league	-
Newark and Sherwood United	United Counties League Premier Division North	9	tbc	Resigned - joined Nottinghamshire League Premier	11
Nostell Miners Welfare	Northern Counties East League Division One	10	Welfare	Relegated to Sheffield & Hallamshire County Senior League Premier	11
Nuneaton Griff	Midland League Division One	10	Heartlanders	Relegated to Midland League Two	11
Pilkington	North West Counties League Premier Division	9	tbc	Resigned - joined Cheshire League Two	13
Rainworth Miners Welfare	United Counties League Division One	10	Wrens	Relegated to Nottinghamshire League Premier	11
Shefford Town & Campton	Spartan South Midlands League Division One	10	Bluemen	Relegated to Bedfordshire County League Premier	11
St Day	South West Peninsula League Premier Division West	10	tbc	Resigned - joined St Piran League Premier West	11
Stockport Town	North West Counties League Premier Division	9	Lions	Resigned - no current league	-
Sunderland West End	Northern League Division Two	10	Albion	Resigned - joined Wearside League Premier	11
Thame United Reserves	Hellenic League Division One	10	United	Relegated to Oxfordshire Senior League Premier	11
Truro City Reserves	South West Peninsula League Premier Division West	10	White Tigers	Resigned - no current league	-
United Services Portsmouth	Wessex League Division One	10	RN	Relegated to Hampshire Premier League Senior	11
VCD Athletic	Isthmian League South East Division	8	Vickers	Club folded	-
Wellington (Herefordshire)	Hellenic League Division One	10	Wellies	Relegated to Herefordshire League One	12
West Allotment Celtic	Northern League Division One	9	Celtic	Resigned - no current league	-
Widnes	Northern Premier League Premier Division	7	Vikings	Club folded	-
Windsor	Combined Counties League Division One	10	Royalists	Resigned - no current league	-
Wolverhampton Sporting	North West Counties League Division One South	10	Wolves Sporting	Resigned - joined West Midlands (Regional) League One	12

== See also ==
- List of former Football League clubs
- List of football clubs in England by major honours won
