= Fire United Christian F.C. =

Association football club in England

Coordinates: 51.519818°N 0.036656276°E

Fire United Christian
- Full name: Fire United Christian Football Club
- Nickname: The Samba Boys
- Founded: 2012
- Dissolved: 2021
- Ground: Terence McMillan Stadium, Plaistow
- Chairman: Gustavo Ferreira
- Manager: Gustavo Ferreira
- League: Eastern Counties League Division One South (season abandoned)
- 2019–20: 18th
Home colours

Fire United Christian Football Club was a football club based in Lewisham, London, England. They played at the Terence McMillan Stadium in Plaistow.

== History ==
The club was founded in 2012 as Fire United Christian by Gustavo Ferreira, and was owned by the Yehoshua Ministries, a Christian group of which Ferreira is the founder. The club had a Christian ethos, with the club's motto being "Worthy are you, our Lord and God, to receive glory and honor [sic] and power", which appears on the club badge. The club mainly contained players from the Brazilian community in London. They joined Division One Central & East of the Middlesex County League for the 2012–13 season. In 2013–14, the club were runners-up in the division. However, they finished bottom of the table the following season, and were inactive in 2015–16. After returning to Division One Central & East for the 2016–17 season, they won the Jim Rogers President's Division One Cup in 2017–18. The club subsequently successfully applied to join the new Division One South of the Eastern Counties League. The 2018–19 season saw the club enter the FA Vase for the first time. They resigned from the Eastern Counties League shortly before the start of the 2020–21 season.

== Ground ==
The club initially played at the Westway Sports Centre in Ladbroke Grove, before moving to the New River Stadium in Wood Green prior to the 2014–15 season. In 2018, they relocated to the Terence McMillan Stadium in Plaistow. The Terence McMillan Stadium has one stand with seats for 192 spectators. The stadium is named after the first Mayor of Newham. The club shared the ground with Lopes Tavares.

== Honours ==
- Middlesex County League
  - Jim Rogers President's Division One Cup winners (1) 2017–18

== Records ==
- Highest league position: 19th in Eastern Counties League Division One South 2018–19
- Best FA Vase performance: First qualifying round 2018–19, 2019–20
