= List of football clubs in Staffordshire =

This is a list of football clubs based in the British county of Staffordshire.

== Men's clubs ==
=== League clubs ===
These clubs play in fully professional leagues, at levels 1–4 of the English football league system.

Club	League	Home ground	Borough
Level 2
Stoke City	EFL Championship	bet365 Stadium	Stoke-on-Trent
Level 3
Burton Albion	League One	Pirelli Stadium	East Staffordshire
Level 4
Port Vale	League Two	Vale Park	Stoke-on-Trent

Location of Staffordshire's Football League clubs
Blue: Premier League
Red: Championship
Green: League One
Yellow: League Two

=== Non-league clubs ===
These clubs play in semi-professional and amateur leagues, at levels 5–10 of the English football league system. The list does not include reserve teams of clubs that may play further down the pyramid -

Club	League	Home ground	District
Level 5
Tamworth	National League	The Lamb Ground	Tamworth
Level 6
Hednesford Town	National League North Premier Division	Keys Park	Cannock Chase
Level 7
Leek Town	Northern Premier League Premier Division	Leek Town F.C.	Staffordshire Moorlands
Level 8
Chasetown	Northern Division One West	The Scholars Ground	Burntwood
Hanley Town	Northern Division One West	Potteries Park	Stoke-on-Trent
Kidsgrove Athletic	Northern Division One West	Hollinwood Road	Newcastle-under-Lyme
Lichfield City	Northern Division One West	City Ground	Lichfield
Newcastle Town	Northern Division One West	Lyme Valley Stadium	Newcastle-under-Lyme
Stafford Rangers	Northern Division One West	Marston Road	Stafford
Level 9
Abbey Hulton United	Midland Premier Division	Birches Head Road	Stoke-on-Trent
Brocton	Midland Premier Division	Silkmore Lane	Stafford
Stone Old Alleynians	Midland Premier Division		Stafford
Uttoxeter Town	Midland Premier Division	Oldfields Sports Ground	East Staffordshire
Level 10
Eccleshall	North West Counties Division One South	Pershall Park	Stafford
Stafford Town	North West Counties Division One South	Evans Park	Stafford
Stapenhill	Midland Division One	Edge Hill	East Staffordshire
Level 11
Rocester	Staffordshire Senior Premier Division	Hillsfield, Mill Street	East Staffordshire

Location of non-league clubs in Staffordshire at levels 5-8 of the English football league system (clubs eligible to compete in the FA Trophy)
Green: Level 5
Blue: Level 6
Red: Level 7
Orange: Level 8
Location of non-league clubs in Staffordshire at levels 9-10 of the English football league system (clubs eligible to compete in the FA Vase)
Red: Level 9
Blue: Level 10
Green: Level 11

== See also ==
- List of football clubs in England
