= 2026–27 Essex Senior Football League =

- Season: 2026-27
- Dates: August 2026 - April 2027
- Teams: 20
- Matches: 380

The 2026-27 Essex Senior League season is the 56th edition of the football competition. The allocations were announced on 14 May 2026. The first 2 fixtures were announced on 9 June 2026 with the rest of the fixtures were announced on the 22 July 2026.

== Team changes ==
=== To the Essex Senior League ===
Relegated from the Isthmian League North Division

- Heybridge Swifts

Promoted from the Eastern Counties League Division One South

- Clapton CFC
- Hutton

=== From the Essex Senior League ===
Promoted to the Isthmian League North Division

- Buckhurst Hill
- Little Oakley

Relegated to the Eastern Counties League Division One South

- Athletic Newham

==== Club changes ====
Heybridge Swifts were relegated from the Isthmian League North Division finishing on 28 points, Heybridge have not been in the division since they were promoted following the 1983–84 season. Hutton have been promoted to the division from the Eastern Counties League Division One South after winning the league finishing on 93 points, this is the first time the club has played at Step 5. Clapton CFC who were promoted by the Play-offs also have not played at a Step 5 status before, although the previous club Clapton F.C. were last in the division in the 2022-23 season before being relegated and eventually folding on 18 June 2024.

Little Oakley, who were promoted to the Isthmian League North Division after winning the league, will be their first season at Step 4, the same applies for Buckhurst Hill who were promoted through the play-offs. Athletic Newham who have been relegated to the Eastern Counties League Division One South finishing on 32 points. this is their first time at Step 6 since the 2020-21 season.

== Stadiums and locations ==
Team	Location	Stadium	Capacity
Barking	Dagenham, East London	Mayesbrook Park	2,500
Basildon United	Basildon, Essex	Gardiners Close	3,000
Benfleet	South Benfleet, Essex	Woodside Stadium	4,100
Clapton C.F.C.	Forest Gate, East London	The Old Spotted Dog Ground	2,500
Frenford	Ilford, East London	Jack Carter Centre	500
Great Wakering Rovers	Great Wakering, Essex	Burroughs Park	2,500
Hackney Wick	Witham, Essex	Simarco Stadium (groundsharing with Witham Town)	2,500
Halstead Town	Halstead, Essex	Rosemary Lane	3,500
Harwich & Parkeston	Harwich, Essex	Royal Oak Ground	3,500
Heybridge Swifts	Heybridge, Essex	Scraley Road	3,000
Hullbridge Sports	Hullbridge, Essex	Lower Road	1,500
Hutton	Billericay, Essex	New Lodge (groundsharing with Billericay Town)	5,000
Ilford	Ilford, East London	Cricklefields Stadium	3,500
Romford	Dagenham, East London	Mayesbrook Park (groundsharing with Barking)	2,500
Saffron Walden Town	Saffron Walden, Essex	Catons Lane	3,500
Sporting Bengal United	Mile End, East London	Mile End Stadium	3,000
Soul Tower Hamlets	Mile End, East London	Mile End Stadium	3,000
West Essex	Walthamstow, East London	Wadham Lodge (groundsharing with Walthamstow)	3,500
White Ensign	Great Wakering, Essex	Burroughs Park (groundsharing with Great Wakering Rovers)	2,500
Woodford Town	Redbridge, East London	Ashton Playing Fields	3,000

== League table ==
Pos	Team	Pld	W	D	L	GF	GA	GD	Pts	Promotion, qualification or relegation
1	Heybridge Swifts	14	13	1	0	42	6	+36	40	Promotion to the Isthmian League North Division
2	Frenford	15	10	3	2	38	23	+15	33	Qualification for the play-offs
3	Barking	15	9	3	3	33	20	+13	30	Qualification for the play-offs
4	Ilford	16	9	3	4	38	27	+11	30	Qualification for the play-offs
5	Hullbridge Sports	13	9	2	2	31	14	+17	29	Qualification for the play-offs
6	West Essex	12	6	4	2	19	9	+10	22	
7	Romford	15	6	4	5	27	27	0	22	
8	Halstead Town	15	6	2	7	28	31	−3	20	
9	Hutton	14	5	4	5	29	24	+5	19	
10	Soul Tower Hamlets	12	6	1	5	15	16	−1	19	
11	Saffron Walden Town	13	6	1	6	20	24	−4	19	
12	White Ensign	14	5	3	6	24	23	+1	18	
13	Basildon United	15	5	2	8	20	28	−8	17	
14	Benfleet	15	5	1	9	22	32	−10	16	
15	Great Wakering Rovers	13	4	3	6	22	20	+2	15	
16	Harwich & Parkeston	15	2	8	5	19	24	−5	14	
17	Clapton Community	15	4	2	9	12	21	−9	14	
18	Woodford Town	14	3	4	7	20	24	−4	13	
19	Hackney Wick	14	1	1	12	15	42	−27	4	Relegation to Step 6
20	Sporting Bengal United	13	1	0	12	12	51	−39	3	Relegation to Step 6

Updated to match(es) played on 14 November 2026. Source: Essex Senior League
Rules for classification: 1) Points; 2) Goal difference; 3) Number of goals scored; 4) Number of matches won; 5) Head-to-head results

== Results table ==
Home / Away	BAR	BAS	BEN	CLC	FRE	GWR	HAW	HAL	H&P	HEY	HUL	HUT	ILF	ROM	SWT	SBU	STH	WEX	WHE	WOT
Barking	---															4-2				
Basildon United		---												1-2						
Benfleet			---					1-0										1-2		
Clapton Community				---													0-1			
Frenford					---															
Great Wakering Rovers					0-2	---														
Hackney Wick							---												2-1	
Halstead Town							4-3	---												
Harwich & Parkeston									---		0-1`	1-0								
Heybridge Swifts										---						3-0				
Hullbridge Sports											---		0-2							
Hutton												---								
Ilford					1-1								---							
Romford														---						1-1
Saffron Walden Town															---					0-6
Sporting Bengal United				3-1												---				
Soul Tower Hamlets																	---			
West Essex										0-0								---		
White Ensign	3-3																		---	
Woodford Town																				---

== Statistics ==
Top Goalscorers
Rank	Player	Team	Goals
1.	Jibran Ahmed	Woodford Town	3
2.	Michael Dixon	Barking	3
3.	Erti Sylejmani	Hackney Wick	3
4.	Yemi Adelani	White Ensign	2
5.	Frederick Agyemang	Sporting Bengal United	2
