= Essex Alliance Football League =

Essex Alliance League
- Founded: 2014
- Country: England
- Divisions: Senior; Premier West/East; Div 1 W/E; D2; D3
- Number of clubs: 75
- Level on pyramid: Level 11 (Senior Division)
- Feeder to: Eastern Counties Football League
- Promotion to: Eastern Counties Football League Division One South
- Domestic cup(s): County level: Essex Premier Cup; Essex Junior Cup; Essex Junior Trophy; London Senior Trophy; London Junior Cup; Amateur FA Intermediate Cup; Anagrams Records Trophy
- League cup(s): Fenton Cup; Fenton Trophy; Senior Division Cup; Premier Division Cup; Division 1 Cup; Division 2 Cup; Division 3 Cup
- Current champions: London Harts United (2025–26)
- Website: Official website

The Essex Alliance Football League is an English football league for clubs based in Essex and north-eastern Greater London. The league has six divisions (Senior, Premier, Divisions One, Two, Three and Four), of which the Senior Division sits at 11th level in the English football league system, formerly Step 7 in the National League System, following the Football Association's approval to become a Regional NLS Feeder League (Step 7) from season 2021–22 onwards. Teams that finish in the top five of the league can apply for promotion to the Division One South of the Eastern Counties Football League (Step 6), subject to their facilities meeting criteria and other conditions.

== History ==
The league was founded in 2014 through the merging of the Ilford and District and the Essex Business House football leagues, which both shared a common aim to support and promote local grassroots football in Essex and East London while bridging the gap with other neighbouring leagues in the region. The league permits member clubs to play on grounds in the boroughs of Havering, Barking & Dagenham, Redbridge, Newham, Waltham Forest, Harlow and Epping Forest.

The league currently has a membership of 76 teams, many of whom were existing members of the aforementioned leagues and were joined by many new clubs as the league seeks to buck the trend of the local Saturday football scene which had been diminishing in numbers over the past few years.

In 2022, history was made in the league as the first direct promotion to senior football was confirmed with DT FC, champions of the Senior Division, successfully promoted to Step 6 within the Eastern Counties Football League Division One South. This was followed by Brimsdown in 2023, by FC Baresi in 2024 and Lymore Gardens in 2025 when Philip United's promotion was rescinded.

During the 2022/23 season, it was announced by the Football Association that four leagues in England would pilot the first ever referee body worn camera trial, the Essex Alliance League one of those chosen to take part for a period of 18-24 months, alongside leagues in Middlesbrough, Liverpool and Worcestershire.

== Member clubs 2026–27 ==
=== Senior Division ===
- Barkingside
- Bealonians
- Chadwell Heath Spartans
- CSM London
- FC Petrocub London
- Greengate District
- Haringey Borough U23
- Kulture Klub
- Newham Wanderers
- Old Barkabbeyans
- Ongar Town
- Ryan
- Saint City
- Sporting Bengal United Reserves
- Vallance
- Waltham Forest Borough
- Woodford Town U23

=== Premier Division East ===
- APSA
- AS Rapid Londra
- Athletic Newham U23
- Bakers693
- Condor
- Dagenham United
- Frenford Development
- Inter Newbury
- Kit Out London
- Old Esthameians
- Redbridge Reserves
- Romford Town Flyers
- Something From Nothing

=== Premier Division West ===
- FC Baresi Reserves
- Hackney Wanderers
- Jolof Sports
- North East Lions
- Ocean Pacific
- Onyx
- Priory Park Rangers
- Royal Forest
- Sporting Hackney
- Unitey
- Walthamstow Reserves
- West Essex Reserves

=== Division One ===
(Split into East and West Divisions as of the 2025/26 season)

East Division

- Barking Development
- Bealonians Reserves
- Chadwell Heath Spartans Reserves
- Eastside Foundation
- Elite Coaching Academy
- FC Alpha
- Get Rich Together
- Loughton Town
- Lymore Gardens Reserves
- Old Barkabbeyans Reserves
- Redbridge Community

West Division

- ACE05
- Concord United
- CSM London U23
- Leyton City
- London Cranes
- London Park City
- Parsonage Leys
- Saint City Reserves
- Sich London
- SP United
- UK Moldova
- Waltham Athletic

=== Division Two East ===
- Buckhurst Way
- Chingford United
- Dagenham United Reserves
- Glendale
- Jays
- Kulture Reserves
- Newhall Rangers
- Old Parkonians Reserves
- Romford Town Flyers Reserves
- Thameside Athletic
- Thurrock Thameside

=== Division Two West ===
- East London Phoenix
- Ekota
- Frenford Development
- Gye Nyame East London
- Haringey United
- Inter Newbury U23
- Lymore Gardens U23
- St. Portland Sau

=== Division Three ===
- Barking Blues
- Chigwell
- Cobra
- Freetown
- Imope
- JK Silvertown
- London Academics
- London East Reserves
- Redbridge U23
- Romford Town Flyers A
- Upminster Albion

== Champions ==
Season	Senior Division	Premier Division	Division One	Division Two	Division Three	Division Four
2014–15	–	Chingford Athletic	Blue Marlin	Grove United		
2015–16	–	Chingford Athletic	Grove United	London ASPA		
2016–17	–	Jolof Sports	Colebrook Royals	Ryan Reserves	Wapping	
2017–18	–	Colebrook Royals	Docklands Albion	Chingford Athletic Reserves	FC Baresi	Haver Town Reserves
2018–19	Jolof Sports	–	FC Baresi	Chingford Athletic Development	Haver Town Reserves	Sungate Reserves
2019–20	Cancelled due to COVID-19 pandemic					
2020–21	Cancelled due to COVID-19 pandemic					
2021–22	DTFC	Frenford 'A'	Belfry	Fairlop Rovers	FC Baresi U23	Sporting Pillars
2022–23	Brimsdown	Chingford Athletic (East); CSM London (West)	Newham Wanderers	Snaresbrook	Newbury East	Romford U19
2023–24	FC Baresi	Fairlop Rovers (East); Philip United (West)	Saint City	Rainham & Barking Phoenix	Woodford Town U23	
2024-25	Philip United	Greengate District(East); Sporting Bengal United Reserves(West)	Condor	Royal Forest	Iona Wheels	
2025-26	London Harts United	Old Barkabbeyans (East) Vallance (West)	Royal Forest (East) Hackney Wanderers (West)	Iona Wheels	Old Parkonians B	

Note: From season 2022/23, the Premier Division was split geographically with East and West divisions. Additionally, from season 2025/26, Division 1 was split geographically with East and West divisions.
