= 2026–27 Southern Combination Football League =

The 2026–27 Southern Combination Football League season is the 102nd in the history of the Southern Combination Football League, a regional football competition in England. The league comprises three divisions at levels 9, 10 and 11 of the English football league system (Steps 5, 6 and county feeder level of the National League System).

The constitution was announced by The Football Association on 14 May 2026.

== Premier Division ==
Southern Combination League Premier Division
- Season: 2026–27
- Dates: 01 August 2026 - 15 April 2027
- Country: England
- Teams: 20
- Matches: 380

Three clubs had left the division after the previous season:-

- Promoted to the Isthmian League South East Division
  - Peacehaven & Telscombe, from fifth position as promotion play-off winners
  - Steyning Town, as champions
- Relegated to Division One
  - Shoreham

The 2026–27 Premier Division comprised 20 clubs, 17 of which had competed the previous season (including Lancing who had been reprieved from relegation) plus 3 additions:-

- Promoted from Division One
  - Billingshurst, from third position as promotion play-off winners
- Relegated from the Isthmian League South East Division
  - East Grinstead Town
  - Hassocks

=== League table ===
Pos	Team	Pld	W	D	L	GF	GA	GD	Pts	Promotion, qualification or relegation
1	Haywards Heath Town	18	15	2	1	47	13	+34	47	Promotion to the Isthmian League
2	Eastbourne United	19	12	4	3	64	26	+38	40	Qualification for the promotion play-offs
3	Hassocks	17	11	3	3	38	18	+20	36	Qualification for the promotion play-offs
4	Guernsey	16	10	3	3	37	22	+15	33	Qualification for the promotion play-offs
5	Roffey	17	10	2	5	37	19	+18	32	Qualification for the promotion play-offs
6	Bexhill United	17	10	2	5	39	25	+14	32	
7	Lingfield	17	9	3	5	42	29	+13	30	
8	East Grinstead Town	17	9	3	5	39	28	+11	30	
9	AFC Varndeanians	19	8	3	8	21	25	−4	27	
10	Crawley Down Gatwick	18	7	4	7	31	36	−5	25	
11	Pagham	16	7	2	7	34	31	+3	23	
12	Newhaven	17	7	2	8	31	37	−6	23	
13	Seaford Town	18	7	1	10	24	37	−13	22	
14	Lancing	17	5	2	10	28	39	−11	17	
15	Wick	17	5	1	11	26	46	−20	16	
16	Billingshurst	20	4	3	13	25	49	−24	15	
17	Little Common	18	4	1	13	25	46	−21	13	
18	Horsham YM	17	3	4	10	16	38	−22	13	
19	Midhurst & Easebourne	17	3	3	11	19	40	−21	12	Relegation to Division One
20	Forest Row	18	4	2	12	24	43	−19	10 (Note: Forest Row had 4 points deducted for fielding an ineligible player.)	Relegation to Division One

Updated to match(es) played on 21 November 2026. Source: The Southern Combination Football League: SCFL Premier
Rules for classification: 1) points; 2) goal difference; 3) number of goals scored; 4) number of matches won; 5) head-to-head results

=== Results table ===
Home \ Away	VAR	BEX	BIL	CDG	EGT	EBU	FOR	GUE	HAS	HHT	HYM	LAN	LIN	LCM	MID	NEW	PAG	ROF	SEA	WIC
AFC Varndeanians		1–0	0–2		0–1			1–0	0–0	1–2	3–0			3–0						1–0
Bexhill United			3–0				2–0			0–2	2–1	2–2	1–2		5–1			2–2	4–1	
Billingshurst		1–2		1–1		2–4			0–4		1–1	0–1	2–2	2–0	3–2				1–2	0–3
Crawley Down Gatwick	0–1	1–5			0–3		4–2	2–2	1–3	2–1				4–2		3–2		2–3	4–0	
East Grinstead Town			6–1	0–1			3–1	0–1	4–4	2–3				2–1			5–3			3–1
Eastbourne United	1–1	8–2		5–1	0–2			2–2						2–0		4–2		3–4		5–1
Forest Row	3–1		1–0	1–1					0–3	1–3			2–2		3–0		0–4		3–4	4–1
Guernsey		2–1			5–1	1–4					5–0	4–0		2–1	2–2		3–0			
Hassocks			4–0			0–0							5–1		H/W (Note: Hassocks v Midhurst & Easebourne (19 September 2026): match not played as Midhurst & Easebourne were unable to field a team, home walkover win awarded to Hassocks)	1–2	2–1		3–1	3–2
Haywards Heath Town	7–1				0–0	2–1							1–0		4–0		2–1	1–0		
Horsham YM	2–3		2–0			0–5	3–1			1–1		1–3	1–3						0–0	
Lancing					3–3	1–3		2–3	3–1	1–3						3–1	5–0	0–3	0–1	
Lingfield			5–3			2–2		5–1	0–1		5–0	3–1			H/W (Note: Lingfield v Midhurst & Easebourne (16 September 2026): match not played as Midhurst & Easebourne were unable to field a team, home walkover win awarded to Lingfield)	6–3			4–1	2–3
Little Common	2–1					1–4	6–1		1–3		0–0					1–2	4–1	0–1	3–1	
Midhurst & Easebourne	1–1	0–2				0–6	3–0				1–3	3–2						3–0		2–2
Newhaven		1–4		1–1			2–1	1–3	2–1	1–5	1–0	3–1			5–0					
Pagham	2–1		5–4									5–0		5–1		1–1		0–0	1–0	3–0
Roffey				3–1	1–2			0–1		0–2	4–1		2–0	8–0		2–1				
Seaford Town	0–1	0–2	1–2		3–2		1–0			0–4							3–2			5–1
Wick	2–0			1–2		2–5				1–4				4–2	2–1			0–4		

Updated to match(es) played on 21 November 2026. Source: The FA Full-time: Southern Combination Football League: 2026–27 Premier Division: Fixtures Grid
Legend: Blue = home team win; Yellow = draw; Red = away team win.

=== Stadia and locations ===
2026–27 Premier Division: location of clubs

Team	Location	Stadium	Capacity
AFC Varndeanians	Brighton (Withdean)	Withdean Stadium	8,850
Bexhill United	Bexhill-on-Sea	The Polegrove	1,000
Billingshurst	Billingshurst	Jubilee Fields	—
Crawley Down Gatwick	Crawley Down	The Haven Centre	1,000
East Grinstead Town	East Grinstead	East Court	3,000
Eastbourne United	Eastbourne	The Oval	1,200
Forest Row	Crawley (Three Bridges)	Jubilee Field (groundshare with Three Bridges)	1,500
Guernsey	Saint Sampson	Victoria Park	5,000
Hassocks	Hassocks	The Beacon Ground	1,000
Haywards Heath Town	Haywards Heath	Hanbury Park	2,000
Horsham YM	Horsham	Gorings Mead	1,575
Lancing	Lancing	Culver Road	1,500
Lingfield	Whyteleafe	Church Road (groundshare with Whyteleafe)	2,000
Little Common	Bexhill-on-Sea (Little Common)	Little Common Recreation Ground	1,200
Midhurst & Easebourne	Easebourne	Rotherfield	1,000
Newhaven	Newhaven	The Trafalgar Ground	3,000
Pagham	Pagham	Nyetimber Lane	1,500
Roffey	Horsham	Hop Oast Stadium (groundshare with Horsham)	3,000
Seaford Town	Seaford	The Crouch	—
Wick	Littlehampton (Wick)	Crabtree Park	2,000

== Division One ==
Southern Combination League Division One
- Season: 2026–27
- Teams: 20

Four clubs had left the division after the previous season:-

- Promoted
  - Billingshurst, from third position as promotion play-off winners to the Premier Division
  - Godalming Town, champions, laterally promoted to the Combined Counties League
- Relegated
  - AFC Uckfield Town, to the Mid-Sussex League
  - Copthorne, to Division Two

The 2026–27 Division One increased from 18 clubs the previous season to 20: these included 14 that had competed the previous season (including Loxwood who had been reprieved from relegation) plus 6 additions:-

- Via promotion
  - Dial Square, from fifth in the Surrey Premier County Football League
  - Hailsham Town, as champions from Division Two
  - Westfield, as champions from the Mid-Sussex League
- Via relegation
  - Guildford City, lateral relegation from the Combined Counties League
  - Shoreham, from the Premier Division
- Via lateral transfer
  - Clanfield, from the Wessex League

=== League table ===
Pos	Team	Pld	W	D	L	GF	GA	GD	Pts	Promotion, qualification or relegation
1	Infinity	18	16	1	1	54	16	+38	49	Promotion to the Premier Division
2	AFC Walcountians	18	12	3	3	46	14	+32	39	Qualification for the promotion play-offs
3	Worthing United	17	11	3	3	45	14	+31	36	Qualification for the promotion play-offs
4	Jarvis Brook	17	11	3	3	36	18	+18	36	Qualification for the promotion play-offs
5	Dial Square	17	10	2	5	27	15	+12	32	Qualification for the promotion play-offs
6	Hailsham Town	18	10	1	7	33	30	+3	31	
7	Reigate Priory	17	9	1	7	40	30	+10	28	
8	Guildford City	18	8	4	6	36	26	+10	28	
9	Saltdean United	16	8	3	5	35	25	+10	27	
10	Mile Oak	18	8	3	7	27	28	−1	27	
11	Loxwood	18	6	5	7	20	23	−3	23	
12	East Preston	17	6	4	7	25	24	+1	22	
13	Selsey	18	6	3	9	22	36	−14	21	
14	Westfield	17	5	5	7	24	25	−1	20	
15	Arundel	18	5	4	9	33	46	−13	19	
16	Oakwood	17	4	5	8	20	36	−16	17	
17	Clanfield	17	4	1	12	18	42	−24	13	
18	Dorking Wanderers B	19	2	4	13	22	44	−22	10	Possible relegation to feeder leagues
19	Shoreham	18	2	4	12	16	50	−34	10	Possible relegation to feeder leagues
20	Ringmer	19	2	3	14	15	52	−37	9	Possible relegation to feeder leagues

Updated to match(es) played on 21 November 2026. Source: The Southern Combination Football League: SCFL Division One
Rules for classification: 1) points; 2) goal difference; 3) number of goals scored; 4) number of matches won; 5) head-to-head results

=== Results table ===
Home \ Away	WAL	ARU	CLA	DIA	DOR	EPR	GUI	HAI	INF	JAR	LOX	MOK	OAK	REI	RIN	SDU	SEL	SHO	WES	WRU
AFC Walcountians			5–1	0–0					0–1		1–0	5–0	5–0	2–3		3–0				
Arundel	2–5			2–1						5–1	3–1	2–2	1–1	0–7	4–2	0–3			1–1	
Clanfield					1–0	2–2	1–0		0–3				1–2	6–2	1–3	1–3	3–0			
Dial Square		3–2	2–0		1–0	1–0	0–1	0–1				2–0			6–0		2–0	3–1	1–0	
Dorking Wand'rs B	0–3	2–2					0–7		4–5	0–1	0–1				0–2	2–2	2–1			
East Preston	1–1	1–4			2–2		5–3		0–3	0–1				1–0	4–0			4–0		
Guildford City		2–1			1–1				2–4		1–1	3–0	4–0					2–0	1–1	0–2
Hailsham Town	1–2	5–2	4–1		2–1	2–1					4–2	1–0	2–1			1–1	1–3			
Infinity		3–0		4–1				2–0				1–0		6–2	3–0	2–1			4–0	
Jarvis Brook	1–3		6–0				3–1	2–0	3–1		1–1				0–0		3–0			2–2
Loxwood			1–0		2–1	0–0									1–0	0–1	3–0			
Mile Oak		4–1			2–1	2–0		3–2			2–1			0–3		1–0				1–1
Oakwood	1–1			1–2					1–2	1–2	1–1	0–1							2–0	0–7
Reigate Priory				0–0	4–1		0–2	3–1	1–3		4–1							1–3		1–0
Ringmer	0–4					0–1	2–4	0–1		2–3		1–7	1–2				0–1	1–1	1–1	
Saltdean United				3–2			1–1						4–5	3–2			6–1	5–2		0–2
Selsey	0–2					3–2	4–1			1–0		1–1	1–1	0–5					1–1	1–2
Shoreham	0–3		2–0		2–4			0–5	0–6	0–4	0–0		1–1				1–4		2–2	
Westfield			4–0		3–1	0–1				1–3	1–3	3–1		1–2				3–0		2–1
Worthing United	3–1	2–1	3–0					6–0	1–1		3–1				8–0	0–2		2–1		

Updated to match(es) played on 21 November 2026. Source: The FA Full-time: Southern Combination Football League: 2026–27 Division One: Fixtures Grid
Legend: Blue = home team win; Yellow = draw; Red = away team win.

=== Stadia and locations ===
2026–27 Division One: location of teams

Team	Location	Stadium	Capacity
AFC Walcountians	Woodmansterne	Walcountians Sports Club	
Arundel	Arundel	Mill Road	2,200
Clanfield	Havant	Westleigh Park (groundshare with Havant & Waterlooville)	5,300
Dial Square	Knaphill	Redding Way (groundshare with Knaphill)	1,000
Dorking Wanderers B	Dorking	Meadowbank	3,000
East Preston	Littlehampton (East Preston)	The Lashmar	1,000
Guildford City	Guildford	Spectrum Football Ground	1,320
Hailsham Town	Hailsham	The Beaconsfield	2,000
Infinity	Sidlesham	Sidlesham Recreation Ground	—
Jarvis Brook	Jarvis Brook	Jarvis Brook Sports Club	—
Loxwood	Loxwood	Plaistow Road	1,000
Mile Oak	Brighton (Mile Oak)	Mile Oak Recreation Ground	—
Oakwood	Crawley (Three Bridges)	Tinsley Lane	—
Reigate Priory	Horley	New Defence (groundshare with Horley Town)	1,800
Ringmer	Ringmer	King's Academy Ringmer	—
Saltdean United	Brighton (Saltdean)	Hill Park	1,000
Selsey	Selsey	Bunn Leisure Stadium	—
Shoreham	Shoreham-by-Sea	Middle Road	2,000
Westfield	Westfield	Knight and Davey Community Stadium	—
Worthing United	Worthing (Broadwater)	The Robert Albon Memorial Ground	1,504

== Division Two ==
Southern Combination Football League Division Two
- Season: 2026–27
- Teams: 15

Two clubs had left the division after the previous season:-

- Promoted
  - Hailsham Town, as champions to Division One
- Relegated
  - Capel, withdrew and relegated to the West Sussex Football League Premier Division

The 2026–27 Division Two comprised 15 clubs, 13 of which had competed the previous season plus 2 additions:-

- Via promotion
  - Hurstpierpoint, lateral promotion as champions of the Mid Sussex Football League Championship Division
- Via relegation
  - Copthorne, from Division One

Promotion from this division is dependent on ground grading as well as league position.

=== League table ===
Pos	Team	Pld	W	D	L	GF	GA	GD	Pts
1	Chichester City B	13	10	1	2	64	12	+52	31
2	Hurstpierpoint	12	10	1	1	42	12	+30	31
3	TD Shipley	13	9	2	2	36	15	+21	29
4	Rustington	12	9	0	3	39	15	+24	27
5	Alfold	12	8	1	3	26	18	+8	25
6	Ferring	12	6	5	1	27	16	+11	23
7	ASC Brighton Rangers	15	5	3	7	20	32	−12	18
8	Rudgwick	14	4	3	7	21	29	−8	15
9	Worthing Town	12	5	0	7	26	45	−19	15
10	Storrington Community	13	4	2	7	23	40	−17	14
11	Upper Beeding	14	4	2	8	20	38	−18	14
12	Southwater	14	3	4	7	25	36	−11	13
13	Bosham	12	3	2	7	21	27	−6	11
14	Brighton Electricity	11	0	4	7	9	27	−18	4
15	Copthorne	13	1	0	12	12	49	−37	3

Updated to match(es) played on 21 November 2026. Source: The Southern Combination Football League: SCFL Division Two
Rules for classification: 1) points; 2) goal difference; 3) number of goals scored; 4) number of matches won; 5) head-to-head results

=== Results table ===
Home \ Away	ALF	ABR	BOS	BRE	CCB	COP	FER	HUR	RUD	RUS	SOU	STO	TDS	UBD	WOT
Alfold		0–1			0–2	4–1			1–1	0–5		3–1	4–3	4–2	
ASC Brighton Rangers			0–4	1–1	1–2			0–5	0–0						0–1
Bosham	0–4	0–2			1–4						5–0	3–3		0–1	
Brighton Electricity			2–2		0–5			1–2			3–3				
Chichester City B						7–1						5–0			17–0
Copthorne		2–3						0–6	2–0		0–4		0–6	0–5	1–2
Ferring				0–0	1–1	2–1			3–0	4–3	1–1	5–1		1–1	5–1
Hurstpierpoint			3–2				3–0			5–2	8–1				3–1
Rudgwick		1–3	3–0	2–1	0–5			1–3				2–2		2–1	
Rustington	0–1	4–1			2–0	3–2							4–0	5–0	
Southwater	1–3	4–4			2–3	4–0			1–5	0–1			1–2		3–1
Storrington Community	1–2			H/W (Note: Storrington Community v Brighton Electricity (29 August 2026): match not played, home walkover win awarded to Storrington Community)		3–2	3–4	3–2		0–6					
TD Shipley		2–1	3–1	4–1	3–0		1–1	0–0	3–1			6–1		3–0	
Upper Beeding		0–1		4–0	1–13			1–2			0–0	0–5			
Worthing Town		6–2	2–3	4–0					4–3	2–4				2–4	

Updated to match(es) played on 21 November 2026. Source: The FA Full-time: Southern Combination Football League: 2026–27 Division Two: Fixtures Grid
Legend: Blue = home team win; Yellow = draw; Red = away team win.

=== Stadia and locations ===
2026–27 Division Two: location of teams

Team	Location	Stadium	Capacity
Alfold	Alfold Crossways	Alfold Recreation Ground	1,000
ASC Brighton Rangers	Lancing	Culver Road (groundshare with Lancing)	1,500
Bosham	Bosham	Walton Lane	—
Brighton Electricity	Brighton (Withdean)	Withdean Stadium (groundshare with AFC Varndeanians)	8,850
Chichester City B	Chichester	Oaklands Park	2,000
Copthorne	Horsham (Roffey)	Bartholomew Way (groundshare at Roffey)	1,000
Ferring	Ferring	The Glebelands	—
Hurstpierpoint	Hurstpierpoint	Fairfield Recreation Ground	1,000
Rudgwick	Rudgwick	King George V Playing Fields	—
Rustington	Rustington	Rustington Recreation Ground	—
Southwater	Southwater	Southwater Sports Club	—
Storrington Community	Storrington	The Recreation Ground, Storrington	—
TD Shipley	Shipley (Dragon's Green)	Dragons Green	—
Upper Beeding	Upper Beeding	Memorial Playing Field	—
Worthing Town	Worthing	Palatine Park	—
