= Terence McMillan Stadium =

Stadium in London

- Interactive map of Terence McMillan Stadium
- Address: 281 Prince Regent Lane, E13 8SD; London; England, United Kingdom
- Location: Plaistow, Newham, East London
- Coordinates: 51.51982°N 0.03665°E
- Capacity: 2000
- Type: athletics & football
- Event: sports stadium
- Surface: natural grass (pitch); Polytan PUR (track)
- Designation: outdoor sports
- Current use: athletics & football
- Public transit: Prince Regent DLR station Custom House station Plaistow tube station Canning Town station 147 bus 300 bus 262 bus 437 bus
- Parking: free

Construction
- Renovated: 1985 (synthetic track); 1995 (track resurfacing)

Tenants
- Newham and Essex Beagles A.C. (1985–); Athletic Newham F.C. (2015– 2024); Clapton F.C. (2020-2024); Fire United Christian F.C. (2018–2021); London APSA (1993–2011); Woodford Town F.C. (2016–2017); Canning Town F.C. (mid-2000s)

The Terence McMillan Stadium is a small athletics and football stadium in Plaistow, in the London Borough of Newham of East London, England.

It is named after the first mayor of Newham, Terence McMillan.

It has traditionally been the stadium of the Newham and Essex Beagles Athletic Club since their move from Barking in 1985.

It has one stand with seats for 192 spectators and an overall maximum capacity of 2000. The athletics track was originally cinder although it is not shown on a 1971 OS map. The opening meeting of the synthetic track was on 26 July 1985. It was resurfaced with Polytan PUR in 1995. The athletics track is 8 lanes wide and there are facilities for hammer, discus and long jump events, as well as changing rooms and free parking.

It was previously the home of Fire United Christian F.C. (2018–2021) London APSA (1993–2011), Woodford Town F.C. (2016–2017) and Canning Town F.C. (mid-2000s). Athletic Newham F.C. and from July 2020 Clapton F.C.
