= London Fennecs F.C. =

Association football club in England

London Fennecs
- Full name: London Fennecs Football Club
- Ground: Paddington Recreation Ground
- Chairman: Mohamed Bettache
- Manager: Zack Bettache
- League: Eastern Counties League Division One South
- 2025–26: Middlesex County League Premier Division, 1st of 17 (promoted)
Home colours	Away colours

London Fennecs Football Club is a football club based in London, England. They are currently members of the Eastern Counties League Division One South.

== History ==
Known as Soccer Stars Fennecs until 2025, the London Fennecs have roots in the British Algerian community in London and is named for the Algeria national football team, also called the Fennecs. The club spent several seasons in the Middlesex County League, ending with the 2025–26 season, when they finished first in the Premier Division.

In 2026, the club was admitted into the Eastern Counties League Division One South.
