= Hertford Heath F.C. =

Association football club in England

Hertford Heath
- Full name: Hertford Heath Football Club
- Nickname: Heath
- Founded: 1907
- Ground: Trinity Road Playing Fields
- Capacity: 1,000. 60 Seated
- Chairman: Matt Shepherd
- Manager: Matt Shepherd
- League: Eastern Counties League Division One South
- 2025–26: Herts County League Premier Division, 3rd of 16 (promoted)
- Website: https://www.pitchero.com/clubs/hertfordheathfc
Home colours	Away colours

Hertford Heath Football Club is a football club based in Stanstead St Margarets, Hertfordshire, England. They are currently members of the Eastern Counties League Division One South.

== History ==
Originally formed in 1907, Hertford Heath spent at least six seasons in the Hertfordshire Senior County League, ending with the 2025–26 season, when they finished third in the Premier Division.

In 2026, the club was admitted into the Eastern Counties League Division One South.

== Records ==
- Best FA Vase performance: Third round, 2026–27
