= Halesworth Town F.C. =

Association football club in England

Halesworth Town
- Full name: Halesworth Town Football Club
- Founded: 1887
- Ground: Dairy Hill Sports Complex
- League: Eastern Counties League Division One North
- 2025–26: Eastern Counties League Division One North, 8th of 20
Home colours	Away colours

Halesworth Town F.C. is a football club based in Halesworth, Suffolk, England. They are currently members of the Eastern Counties League Division One North, having won promotion to it from the Suffolk & Ipswich League in 2025.

Halesworth Town were founded in 1887. They have competed in local football competitions for much of their history, joining the Suffolk and Ipswich League in 1966. They achieved promotion to a regional level competition for the first time in 2025, entering into the Eastern Counties League. They have won the Suffolk FA Junior Cup three times, in 1906, 1924, and 2020.In 2026 won Suffolk Senior Cup beating Wrentham and Muntford 2-0 in the final.

They play at the Dairy Hill Sports Complex in Halesworth.

== Records ==
- Best FA Vase performance: Third round, 2025–26
