= London Harts United F.C. =

Association football club in England

London Harts United
- Full name: London Harts United Football Club
- Founded: 2023
- Ground: The Harlow Arena, Harlow
- Chairman: Julian Brown
- Manager: Dany Tuyishimire
- League: Eastern Counties League Division One South
- 2025–26: Essex Alliance Premier Division, 1st of 16 (promoted)
Home colours	Away colours

London Harts United Football Club is a football club based in Harlow, Essex, England. They are currently members of the Eastern Counties League Division One South.

== History ==
Philip United was formed in 2023, and was renamed London Harts United in June 2025. The club spent three seasons in the Essex Alliance League: they competed in the Premier Division (West) in 2023–24, and competed in the Senior Division in both 2024–25 and 2025–26. In all three seasons they finished champions of their division, with the latter season in particular seeing the club finish unbeaten.

In 2026, the club was admitted into the Eastern Counties League Division One South.
