= Hutton F.C. =

Association football club in England

Coordinates: 51°37′18″N 0°24′12″E

Hutton
- Full name: Hutton Football Club
- Nickname: Tons
- Founded: 1928; 98 years ago
- Ground: New Lodge, Billericay
- Capacity: 4,800 (2,000 seated)
- Chairman: Peter Boem
- Manager: Matt Rose
- League: Essex Senior League
- 2025–26: Eastern Counties League Division One South, 1st of 21 (promoted)
Home colours

Hutton Football Club is a football club based in Hutton, England. They are currently members of the Essex Senior League and play at New Lodge, Billericay, groundsharing with Billericay Town.

== History ==
Hutton were formed in 1928. In 1989, the club joined the Essex Intermediate League, being placed in the newly formed Division Three. In 2011, the club won Division One of the now renamed Essex Olympian League, gaining promotion to the Premier Division. Following relegation in 2013, the club were promoted back to the Premier Division in 2018. In 2023, Hutton won the Essex Olympian League. In the same year, the club was admitted into the Eastern Counties Division One South after winning the Essex and Suffolk Border League.

In the 2025–26 season the club went on to win the Eastern Counties League Division One South gaining promotion to the Essex Senior League.

== Ground ==
In 2022, Hutton began a groundsharing agreement with Tilbury to play at Chadfields, moving from their Polo Fields home on Hall Green Lane. Ahead of the 2023–24 season, Hutton began groundsharing with Billericay Town at New Lodge.

== Records ==
- Best FA Cup performance: Extra preliminary round, 2026–27
- Best FA Vase performance: First round, 2025–26

== Honours ==
- Eastern Counties League Division One South: 2025–26
