= Athletic Newham F.C. =

Association football club in England

Coordinates: 51°32′36.4″N 0°8′4.8″E

Athletic Newham
- Full name: Athletic Newham Football Club
- Nickname: The Kings
- Founded: 2015; 11 years ago
- Ground: Bobby Moore Sports Hub, Dagenham
- Capacity: 150 (100 seated)
- Chairman: Ulisses Filipe Lopes Tavares
- Manager: Francesco Zabotti
- League: Eastern Counties League Division One South
- 2025–26: Essex Senior League, 20th of 20 (relegated)
- Website: https://www.athleticnewhamfc.com/
Home colours

Athletic Newham Football Club is a football club formed in Newham, England. They are currently members of the Eastern Counties League Division One South and play at the Bobby Moore Sports Hub in Dagenham.

== History ==
The club was founded in 2015 as a youth team known as Lopes Tavares London before transitioning to adult football the following season and joining the Essex Alliance Football League.

After two seasons in the Premier Division, the club applied for and joined the newly formed Division One South, part of the Eastern Counties Football League, for the 2018/19 season.

In the 2020/21 season, the club was renamed from Lopes Tavares London to Athletic Newham. That same season, the club were promoted to the Essex Senior Premier Division based on their overall performance in the abandoned 2019/20 and 2020/21 seasons.

In the 2021/22 season, the club finished 8th in the Essex Senior League, 7 points outside the playoffs.

The following season saw Athletic Newham miss the playoffs by a single point.

The 2023/24 season saw the club finish eleventh, whilst adding a Sunday side, who started playing in the Essex Sunday Corinthian Football League Division Five.

In 2024/25 the club once again finished midtable in the Essex Senior League, improving to tenth.

== Stadium ==
Following time at the Memorial Recreation Ground, the club moved to the Terence McMillan Stadium in Plaistow.

On 12 September 2024, Athletic Newham announced they would be moving out of Newham, moving to The Bobby Moore Sports Hub,Parsloes Park in Dagenham.

== Records ==
- Highest league position: 6th in Essex Senior League, 2022–23
- Best FA Vase performance: Fifth round, 2021–22
- Best FA Cup performance: First qualifying round, 2024–25 (replay)
