= 1992–93 Kent Football League =

The 1992–93 Kent Football League season (known as the Winstonlead Kent League for sponsorship reasons) was the 27th in the history of the Kent Football League, a football competition in England.

The League structure comprised two divisions: Division One and Division Two with the latter known as the Reserves Section (reserves teams were not permitted in Division One). Additionally there were two league cup competitions: the Challenge Cup for the Division One clubs and another for the teams in Division Two.

== Division One ==
Kent Football League Division One
- Season: 1992–93
- Champions: Tonbridge AFC
- Promoted: Tonbridge AFC
- Matches: 420
- Goals: 1,495 (3.56 per match)

The league featured 21 clubs, 20 of which competed in the previous season together with one additional club:

- Folkestone Invicta, joined from Division Two

The league was won by Tonbridge AFC who were promoted back to the Southern Football League after four seasons in the Kent League.

=== League table ===
Pos	Team	Pld	W	D	L	GF	GA	GD	Pts	Promotion
1	Tonbridge AFC	40	27	9	4	107	39	+68	90	Promoted to the Southern League Southern Division
2	Herne Bay	40	26	6	8	96	44	+52	84	
3	Sheppey United	40	24	9	7	65	29	+36	81	
4	Deal Town	40	24	7	9	128	58	+70	79	
5	Alma Swanley	40	24	4	12	93	65	+28	76	
6	Chatham Town	40	19	11	10	79	52	+27	68	
7	Danson Furness United	40	18	13	9	58	40	+18	67	
8	Thamesmead Town	40	17	9	14	62	56	+6	60	
9	Beckenham Town	40	17	8	15	64	60	+4	59	
10	Whitstable Town	40	18	4	18	77	64	+13	58	
11	Slade Green	40	15	13	12	71	60	+11	58	
12	Ramsgate	40	17	5	18	78	76	+2	56	
13	Folkestone Invicta	40	16	5	19	78	95	−17	53	
14	Tunbridge Wells	40	13	6	21	66	102	−36	45	
15	Faversham Town	40	11	10	19	44	71	−27	43	
16	Greenwich Borough	40	12	5	23	49	75	−26	41	
17	Cray Wanderers	40	10	8	22	64	79	−15	38	
18	Kent Police	40	10	7	23	56	120	−64	37	
19	Darenth Heathside	40	9	7	24	54	104	−50	34	
20	Corinthian	40	6	8	26	50	98	−48	26	
21	Crockenhill	40	6	8	26	56	108	−52	26	

Source: FCHD nonleaguematters
Rules for classification: 1) points; 2) goal difference; 3) number of goals scored.

=== Challenge Cup ===
The 1992–93 Kent Football League Challenge Cup was won by Ramsgate.

The competition was contested by the 21 teams from Division One over four single match knock-out rounds followed by the final played on a neutral ground (at Whitstable Town F.C. this season).

==== Quarter-finals, Semi-finals and Final ====
Quarter-finals
Beckenham Town	1
Faversham Town	0
Deal Town	2
Thamesmead Town	0
Alma Swanley	1
Herne Bay	4
Ramsgate	2
Greenwich Borough	0

Semi-finals
Beckenham Town	2 (Note: After extra time; score at 90 minutes 0–0)
Deal Town	0
Herne Bay	1 (Note: After extra time; score at 90 minutes 1–1)
Ramsgate	2

Final
Beckenham Town	0
Ramsgate	1

Sources:

- Quarter-finals: "Football Results, Fixtures & League Tables: Results: Saturday: Winstonlead Kent League Cup". Dover Express. 15 January 1993. p. 55 – via British Newspaper Archive.
- Semi-finals: "Football Results, Fixtures & League Tables: Results: Saturday: Winstonlead Kent League Cup". Dover Express. 12 March 1993. p. 62 – via British Newspaper Archive.
- Final: "Football Results, Fixtures & League Tables: Results: Saturday: Winstonlead Kent League Cup". Dover Express. 29 April 1993. p. 62 – via British Newspaper Archive.

==== Second Round ====
- Beckenham Town 2 – 1 Crockenhill
- Folkestone Invicta 0 – 4 Faversham Town
- Deal Town 8 – 0 Corinthian
- Thamesmead Town 3 – 1 Tonbridge AFC
- Alma Swanley 2 – 1 Cray Wanderers
- Herne Bay 3 – 2 Tunbridge Wells
- Danson Furness United 0 – 1 Ramsgate
- Sheppey United 0 – 1 Greenwich Borough

==== First Round ====
- Folkestone Invicta 2 – 1 (aet) Whitstable Town (Score at 90 minutes: 1–1)
- Slade Green 2 –3 Corinthian
- Alma Swanley 1 – 0 Chatham Town
- Kent Police 3 – 3 (aet) Ramsgate (Score at 90 minutes: 3–3)
- REPLAY: Ramsgate 3 – 2 Kent Police
- Darenth Heathside 0 – 1 Sheppey United
- Byes for the other 11 teams

== Reserves Section ==
The letter "R" following team names indicates a club’s reserves team.

The 1992–93 Division Two featured reserves teams (which were not permitted in Division One) from clubs from Kent and the adjacent area whose first team played in Division One and other higher ranked leagues. There was a League Cup competition for the teams in the section.

=== Division Two ===
Kent Football League Division Two
- Season: 1992–93
- Champions: Dover Athletic R
- Matches: 182
- Goals: 699 (3.84 per match)

The division featured 14 clubs, 12 who had competed in the previous season together with two additional clubs:

- Folkestone Invicta R, joining from the Kent County League and replacing their first team.
- Tonbridge AFC R

Dover Athletic R were the division winners.

At the end of the season Cray Wanderers R did not seek re-election and left the division.

==== League table ====
Pos	Team	Pld	W	D	L	GF	GA	GD	Pts	Season End Notes
1	Dover Athletic R	26	21	3	2	81	23	+58	66	
2	Herne Bay R	26	20	2	4	78	27	+51	62	
3	Hastings Town R	26	16	1	9	73	39	+34	49	
4	Beckenham Town R	26	14	5	7	54	41	+13	47	
5	Canterbury City R	26	12	5	9	62	58	+4	41	
6	Thamesmead Town R	26	10	7	9	47	39	+8	37	
7	Whitstable Town R	26	10	4	12	40	57	−17	34	
8	Tonbridge AFC R	26	9	6	11	44	49	−5	33	
9	Darenth Heathside R	26	10	3	13	34	44	−10	33	
10	Folkestone Invicta R	26	7	4	15	36	58	−22	25	
11	Chatham Town R	26	7	3	16	48	59	−11	24	
12	Deal Town R	26	6	5	15	43	66	−23	23	
13	Cray Wanderers R	26	6	4	16	32	70	−38	22	Resigned
14	Ramsgate R	26	4	8	14	27	69	−42	20	

Source: "Final Table: Winstonlead Kent League: Division 2". Kent Messenger. 14 May 1993. p. 71 – via British Newspaper Archive.
Rules for classification: 1) points; 2) goal difference; 3) number of goals scored.

=== Division Two Cup ===
The 1992–93 Kent Football League Division Two Cup was won by Tonbridge AFC R.

The competition was contested by the 14 teams from Division Two over three single match knock-out rounds followed by the final played on a neutral ground (at Herne Bay F.C. this season).

==== Quarter-finals, Semi-finals and Final ====
Quarter-finals
Canterbury City R	3
Chatham Town R	1
Hastings Town R	1
Herne Bay R	0
Folkestone Invicta R	0
Tonbridge AFC R	2
Whitstable Town R	3
Beckenham Town R	0

Semi-finals
Canterbury City R	0 (Note: After extra time)	4 (Note: Replay)
Hastings Town R	0	3
Tonbridge AFC R	2
Whitstable Town R	0

Final
Canterbury City R	0
Tonbridge AFC R	1

Sources:

- Quarter-finals: "Results, Fixtures and Tables: Saturday 23 January: Winstonlead Kent League: Division Two Cup". Whitstable Times. 28 January 1993. p. 39 – via British Newspaper Archive.; "Results, Fixtures and Tables: Saturday 20 February: Winstonlead Kent League: Division Two Cup". Whitstable Times. 25 February 1993. p. 35 – via British Newspaper Archive.; "Results, Fixtures and Tables: Saturday 27 February: Winstonlead Kent League: Division Two Cup". Whitstable Times. 4 March 1993. p. 35 – via British Newspaper Archive.
- Semi-finals: "Results, Fixtures, Tables: Results: Saturday: Winstonlead Kent League: Division 2 Cup". Kentish Gazette. 19 March 1993. p. 61 – via British Newspaper Archive.; "Results, Fixtures, Tables: Results: Thursday: Winstonlead Kent League: Division 2 Cup". Kentish Gazette. 25 March 1993. p. 61 – via British Newspaper Archive.
- Final: "Results, Fixtures, Tables: Results: Wednesday: Winstonlead Kent League: Division 2 Cup". Kentish Gazette. 7 May 1993. p. 53 – via British Newspaper Archive.

==== First Round ====
- Thamesmead Town R 1 –2 Canterbury City R
- Chatham Town R 3 – 1 Ramsgate R
- Hastings Town R 5 – 3 Deal Town R
- Folkestone Invicta R 2 –0 Cray Wanderers R
- Tonbridge AFC R 4 –2 (aet) Dover Athletic R
- Darenth Heathside R 2 – 2 (aet) Beckenham Town R
- REPLAY: Beckenham Town R 3 – 0 Darenth Heathside R
- Byes for Herne Bay R and Whitstable Town R
