= 1989–90 Kent Football League =

Association football league season

The 1989–90 Kent Football League season (known as the Winstonlead Kent League for sponsorship reasons) was the twenty-fourth in the history of the Kent Football League, a football competition featuring teams based in and around the county of Kent in England.

The League structure comprised two divisions: Division One and Division Two with the latter known as the Reserves Section (reserves teams were not permitted in Division One). Additionally there were two league cup competitions: the Challenge Cup for the Division One clubs and another for the teams in Division Two.

== Division One ==
Kent Football League Division One
- Season: 1989–90
- Champions: Faversham Town
- Matches: 380
- Goals: 1,246 (3.28 per match)

The league featured twenty clubs, nineteen of which competed in the previous season together with one additional club:

- Tonbridge, relegated from the Southern League

The league was won by Faversham Town, for the fourth time in their history (after an eleven season gap since their previous title).

At the end of the season both bottom clubs, Metropolitan Police (Hayes) and Ramsgate, were re-elected to continue their membership of the division.

=== League table ===
Pos	Team	Pld	W	D	L	GF	GA	GD	Pts	Season End Notes
1	Faversham Town	38	28	4	6	101	30	+71	88	
2	Sittingbourne	38	27	5	6	85	37	+48	86	
3	Tonbridge AFC	38	26	6	6	87	42	+45	84	
4	Deal Town	38	21	11	6	88	48	+40	74	
5	Alma Swanley	38	22	8	8	80	41	+39	74	
6	Greenwich Borough (Note: Greenwich Borough were deducted one point and one goal)	38	20	6	12	66	55	+11	65 (Note: Greenwich Borough were deducted one point)	
7	Tunbridge Wells	38	17	9	12	85	66	+19	60	
8	Whitstable Town	38	17	5	16	51	57	−6	56	
9	Slade Green	38	14	8	16	54	61	−7	50	
10	Darenth Heathside	38	12	12	14	61	64	−3	48	
11	Kent Police	38	13	9	16	60	84	−24	48	
12	Beckenham Town	38	12	10	16	54	60	−6	46	
13	Thames Polytechnic	38	11	11	16	49	61	−12	44	
14	Herne Bay	38	12	7	19	64	62	+2	43	
15	Crockenhill (Note: Crockenhill were deducted three points and four goals - the deducted goals have been reinstated in the table)	38	12	6	20	56	75	−19	39 (Note: Crockenhill were deducted three points.)	
16	Chatham Town	38	9	8	21	38	84	−46	35	
17	Danson	38	8	9	21	42	58	−16	33	
18	Cray Wanderers	38	7	11	20	48	74	−26	32	
19	Metropolitan Police (Hayes) (Note: Metropolitan Police (Hayes) were deducted two goals - the deducted goals have been reinstated in the table)	38	8	4	26	38	87	−49	28	Re-elected
20	Ramsgate	38	6	7	25	39	100	−61	25	Re-elected

Source: "Kent League 1966–92: 1989–90". Non League Matters., "England – Kent League: Final Table Kent League (Division 1) '89–'90". The Rec.Sport.Soccer Statistics Foundation.
Rules for classification: 1) points; 2) goal difference; 3) number of goals scored.

=== Challenge Cup ===
The 1989–90 Kent Football League Challenge Cup was won by league newcomers (who had been relegated into the division) Tonbridge AFC.

The competition, contested by all twenty clubs in Division One, comprised five single match tie rounds (with the first round featuring four ties) culminating in the final which was played on a neutral ground (at Chatham Town F.C. this season).

==== Quarter-finals, Semi-finals and Final ====
Quarter-finals
Sittingbourne	0
Tonbridge AFC	1
Greenwich Borough	1
Deal Town	2
Tunbridge Wells	2 (Note: After extra time, score at 90 minutes: 2–2)	1 (Note: Replay: after extra time, score at 90 minutes: 0–0)	3p (Note: Penalty shoot-out)
Whitstable Town	2	1	5p
Faversham Town	3
Ramsgate	1

Semi-finals
Tonbridge AFC	0 (Note: After extra time)	1 (Note: Replay)
Deal Town	0	0
Whitstable Town	1
Faversham Town	0

Final
Tonbridge AFC	1
Whitstable Town	0

==== Second Round ====
- Herne Bay 0 – 1 Sittingbourne
- Beckenham Town 0 – 1 Tonbridge AFC
- Metropolitan Police (Hayes) 3– 3 (aet) Greenwich Borough
- Replay 1: Greenwich Borough 0 – 0 (aet) Metropolitan Police (Hayes)
- Replay 2: Greenwich Borough 1 – 0 Metropolitan Police (Hayes)
- Deal Town 4 – 1 Danson
- Tunbridge Wells 2 – 1 Darenth Heathside
- Alma Swanley 0 – 1 Whitstable Town
- Faversham Town 4 – 0 Crockenhill
- Chatham Town 2 – 4 (aet) Ramsgate (score at 90 minutes: 2–2)

==== First Round ====
- Kent Police 2 – 3 (aet) Beckenham Town
- Slade Green 1 – 2 Greenwich Borough
- Whitstable Town 4 – 1 Thames Polytechnic
- Cray Wanderers 0 – 1 Faversham Town
- Byes for the other twelve clubs

Sources:

- Final: "All The latest, fixtures and tables: Results: Saturday: Winstonlead Kent League Cup Final". Kentish Gazette. 4 May 1990. p. 79 – via British Newspaper Archive.
- Semi-finals: "All The Latest Details: Results: Saturday: Winstonlead Kent League: Division 1 Cup, semi-finals". Kentish Gazette. 30 March 1990. p. 86 – via British Newspaper Archive.; "All The Latest Details: Results: Wednesday: Winstonlead Kent League: Division 1 Cup, semi-final replay". Kentish Gazette. 30 March 1990. p. 86 – via British Newspaper Archive.
- Quarter-finals: "All The Latest Details: Results: Tuesday: Winstonlead Kent League: Division 1 Cup, quarter-final". Kentish Gazette. 9 February 1990. p. 87 – via British Newspaper Archive.; "All The Latest Details: Results: Saturday: Winstonlead Kent League: Division 1 Cup, quarter-finals". Kentish Gazette. 23 February 1990. p. 79 – via British Newspaper Archive.; "All The Latest Details: Results: Saturday: Winstonlead Kent League: Division 1 Cup, quarter-final". Kentish Gazette. 9 March 1990. p. 79 – via British Newspaper Archive.; "All The Latest Details: Results: Tuesday: Winstonlead Kent League: Division 1 Cup, quarter-final". Kentish Gazette. 9 March 1990. p. 79 – via British Newspaper Archive.; "All The Latest Details: Results: Tuesday: Winstonlead Kent League: Division 1 Cup, quarter-final replay". Kentish Gazette. 9 March 1990. p. 79 – via British Newspaper Archive.
- Second Round: "All the latest details: Results: Saturday: Winstonlead Kent League: Division 1 Cup, second round". Kentish Gazette. 1 December 1989. p. 87 – via British Newspaper Archive.; "Results: Saturday: Winstonlead Kent League: Division 1 Cup, second round". Kentish Gazette. 8 December 1989. p. 79 – via British Newspaper Archive.; "All the latest details: Results: Saturday: Winstonlead Kent League: Division 1 Cup, second round". Kentish Gazette. 12 January 1990. p. 79 – via British Newspaper Archive.; "All the latest details: Results: Saturday: Winstonlead Kent League: Division 1 Cup, second round". Kentish Gazette. 19 January 1990. p. 77 – via British Newspaper Archive.; "All The Latest Details: Results: Wednesday: Winstonlead Kent League: Division 1 Cup, second round replay". Kentish Gazette. 26 January 1990. p. 95 – via British Newspaper Archive.; "All The Latest Details: Results: Wednesday: Winstonlead Kent League: Division 1 Cup – second round, second replay". Kentish Gazette. 16 February 1990. p. 79 – via British Newspaper Archive.
- First Round: "Senior soccer details: Results: Saturday: Winstonlead Kent League Cup 1st rd". Kent Messenger. 29 September 1989. p. 78 – via British Newspaper Archive.; "Scores, fixtures and tables: Results: Saturday: Winstonlead Kent League: Division 1 Cup, first round". Kentish Gazette. 6 October 1989. p. 87 – via British Newspaper Archive.

== Reserves Section ==
The letter "R" following team names indicates a club's reserves team.

Division Two featured reserves teams (which were not permitted in Division One) from clubs from Kent and the adjacent area whose first team played in Division One and other higher ranked leagues. There was a League Cup competition for the teams in the section.

=== Division Two ===
Kent Football League Division Two
- Season: 1989–90
- Champions: Margate R
- Matches: 272
- Goals: 915 (3.36 per match)

The league featured seventeen reserves teams, fifteen of which had competed in the division the previous season together with two additional clubs:

- Canterbury City R, returning after a three season absence
- Fisher Athletic R, returning after a one season absence

Thanet United R changed their name back to Margate R and they won the division, their first Kent League divisional title win since winning the inaugural re-formed Kent League in the 1967–68 season.

After the end of the season Folkestone R went into liquidation and left the league, Greenwich Borough R withdrew and both bottom clubs, Ramsgate R and Herne Bay R, were re-elected to continue their membership of the division.

==== League table ====
Pos	Team	Pld	W	D	L	GF	GA	GD	Pts	Season End Notes
1	Margate R	32	23	3	6	72	34	+38	72	
2	Hastings Town R	32	21	3	8	73	41	+32	66	
3	Canterbury City R (Note: Canterbury City R were deducted three points and one goal - the deducted goal has been reinstated in the table)	32	20	5	7	74	46	+28	62 (Note: Canterbury City R were deducted three points)	
4	Dover Athletic R	32	18	7	7	84	40	+44	61	
5	Sittingbourne R	32	18	3	11	65	35	+30	57	
6	Fisher Athletic R (Note: Fisher Athletic R were deducted four points and five goals - the deducted goals have been reinstated in the table)	32	18	6	8	79	39	+40	56 (Note: Fisher Athletic R were deducted four points)	
7	Folkestone R	32	16	7	9	55	47	+8	55	Resigned
8	Ashford Town R	32	13	7	12	40	43	−3	46	
9	Greenwich Borough R	32	14	4	14	60	64	−4	46	Resigned
10	Beckenham Town R (Note: Beckenham Town R were deducted two goals - the deducted goals have been reinstated in the table)	32	12	5	15	51	47	+4	41	
11	Thames Polytechnic R	32	10	8	14	41	50	−9	38	
12	Whitstable Town R (Note: Whitstable Town R were deducted three points and one goal - the deducted goal has been reinstated in the table)	32	9	6	17	40	62	−22	30 (Note: Whitstable Town R were deducted three points)	
13	Cray Wanderers R	32	8	6	18	34	66	−32	30	
14	Faversham Town R	32	8	4	20	39	90	−51	28	
15	Sheppey United R (Note: Sheppey United R were deducted three points and one goal - the deducted goal has been reinstated in the table)	32	8	5	19	35	63	−28	26 (Note: Sheppey United R were deducted three points)	
16	Ramsgate R	32	7	3	22	43	79	−36	24	Re-elected
17	Herne Bay R	32	5	6	21	30	69	−39	21	Re-elected

Source: "All The latest, fixtures and tables: Winstonlead Kent League: Final Tables: Division Two". Kentish Gazette. 11 May 1990. p. 64 – via British Newspaper Archive. (Note: The source table is net of the goal deductions to Beckenham Town R, Canterbury City R, Fisher Athletic R, Sheppey United R and Whitstable Town R)
Rules for classification: 1) points; 2) goal difference; 3) number of goals scored.

=== Division Two Cup ===
The 1989–90 Kent Football League Division Two Cup was won by Canterbury City R, their first Kent League trophy.

The competition, contested by all seventeen clubs in the division, comprised five single match tie rounds (with the first round featuring one tie) culminating in the final played on a neutral ground (at Ramsgate F.C. this season).

==== Quarter-finals, Semi-finals and Final ====
Quarter-finals
Canterbury City R	2
Margate R	0
Winner of Thames Polytechnic R v Sheppey United R tie
Ashford Town R
Dover Athletic R	4
Hastings Town R	1
Folkestone R
Beckenham Town R

Semi-finals
Canterbury City R	1 (Note: After extra time, score at 90 minutes: 0–0)
Ashford Town R	0
Dover Athletic R	3 (Note: After extra time, score at 90 minutes: 2–2)
Folkestone R	2

Final
Canterbury City R	2
Dover Athletic R	1

==== Second Round ====
- Herne Bay R 0 – 4 Canterbury City R
- Margate R 3 – 0 (aet) Fisher Athletic R (score at 90 minutes: 0–0)
- Sheppey United R 2 – 2 (aet) Thames Polytechnic R
- Replay: Thames Polytechnic R v Sheppey United R
- Ashford Town R 3 – 0 Sittingbourne R
- Whitstable Town R 0 – 3 Dover Athletic R
- Greenwich Borough R 1 – 3 Hastings Town R
- Ramsgate R 2 – 5 Folkestone R
- Cray Wanderers R 2 – 3 Beckenham Town R

==== First Round ====
- Folkestone R 2 – 0 Faversham Town R
- Byes for the other fifteen clubs

Sources:

- Final: "All The latest, fixtures and tables: Results: Bank Holiday Monday: Winstonlead Kent League: Division 2 Cup final". Kentish Gazette. 11 May 1990. p. 87 – via British Newspaper Archive.
- Semi-finals: "All The Latest Details: Results: Wednesday: Winstonlead Kent League: Division 2 Cup, semi-final". Kentish Gazette. 6 April 1990. p. 85 – via British Newspaper Archive.; "All The latest, fixtures and tables: Results: Saturday: Winstonlead Kent League: Division 2 Cup, semi-final". Kentish Gazette. 27 April 1990. p. 79 – via British Newspaper Archive.
- Quarter-finals: "All The Latest Details: Results: Wednesday: Winstonlead Kent League: Division 2 Cup, quarter-final". Kentish Gazette. 9 March 1990. p. 79 – via British Newspaper Archive.; "All The Latest Details: Results: Thursday: Winstonlead Kent League: Division 2 Cup, quarter-final". Kentish Gazette. 6 April 1990. p. 85 – via British Newspaper Archive.
- Second Round: "Results: Saturday: Winstonlead Kent League: Division 2 Cup, second round". Kentish Gazette. 8 December 1989. p. 79 – via British Newspaper Archive.; "All Your Results, Fixtures and Tables: Results: Thursday: Winstonlead Kent League: Division 2 Cup, second round". Kentish Gazette. 15 December 1989. p. 70 – via British Newspaper Archive.; "All Your Results, Fixtures and Tables: Results: Saturday: Winstonlead Kent League: Division 2 Cup, second round". Kentish Gazette. 15 December 1989. p. 70 – via British Newspaper Archive.; "All the latest details: Results: Saturday: Winstonlead Kent League: Division 2 Cup, second round". Kentish Gazette. 5 January 1990. p. 61 – via British Newspaper Archive.; "All The Latest Details: Results: Tuesday: Winstonlead Kent League: Division 2 Cup, second round". Kentish Gazette. 23 February 1990. p. 79 – via British Newspaper Archive.; "Reserves swoop in extra time". Isle of Thanet Gazette. 2 March 1990. p. 32 – via British Newspaper Archive.
- First Round: "All the latest details: Results: Tuesday: Winstonlead Kent League: Division 2 Cup, first round". Kentish Gazette. 24 November 1989. p. 87 – via British Newspaper Archive.
