= 1996–97 Kent Football League =

The 1996–97 Kent Football League season (known as the Winstonlead Kent League for sponsorship reasons) was the 31st in the history of the Kent Football League, a football competition in England.

The League structure comprised two divisions: Division One and Division Two with the latter known as the Reserves Section (reserves teams were not permitted in Division One). Additionally there were two league cup competitions: the Challenge Cup for the Division One clubs and another for the teams in Division Two.

== Division One ==
Kent Football League Division One
- Season: 1996–97
- Champions: Herne Bay
- Matches: 420
- Goals: 1,227 (2.92 per match)

The league featured 21 clubs, 19 of which competed in the previous season together with two additional clubs:

- Lordswood, joined from the Kent County League
- Woolwich Town, transferred from the Spartan League

The league was won for the third time during the 1990s by Herne Bay, who recorded a League and Cup double.

=== League table ===
Pos	Team	Pld	W	D	L	GF	GA	GD	Pts
1	Herne Bay	40	23	11	6	73	35	+38	80
2	Ramsgate	40	24	5	11	82	47	+35	77
3	Furness	40	23	8	9	66	38	+28	77
4	Sheppey United	40	22	7	11	74	47	+27	73
5	Deal Town	40	20	5	15	80	56	+24	65
6	Folkestone Invicta	40	19	7	14	66	57	+9	64
7	Whitstable Town	40	17	12	11	61	44	+17	63
8	Chatham Town	40	16	11	13	60	52	+8	59
9	Greenwich Borough	40	16	10	14	71	62	+9	58
10	Faversham Town	40	16	9	15	58	73	−15	57
11	Beckenham Town	40	15	10	15	49	47	+2	55
12	Canterbury City	40	15	10	15	47	55	−8	55
13	Hythe United	40	15	8	17	70	76	−6	53
14	Thamesmead Town	40	15	8	17	53	61	−8	53
15	Lordswood	40	14	8	18	57	72	−15	50
16	Slade Green	40	12	9	19	45	50	−5	45
17	Woolwich Town	40	10	13	17	40	62	−22	43
18	Cray Wanderers	40	11	6	23	43	66	−23	39
19	Crockenhill	40	9	11	20	51	80	−29	38
20	Tunbridge Wells	40	8	10	22	44	76	−32	34
21	Corinthian	40	8	6	26	37	71	−34	30

Source: FCHD nonleaguematters
Rules for classification: 1) points; 2) goal difference; 3) number of goals scored.

=== Challenge Cup ===
The 1996–97 Kent Football League Challenge Cup was won for the first time in their history by Herne Bay, who completed a League and Cup double.

The competition was contested by the 21 teams from the Division One over five rounds: the first three were a single match knock-out followed by the semi-finals on an aggregate basis (home and away matches) and the final match played on a neutral ground (at Folkestone Invicta F.C. this season).

==== Quarter-finals, Semi-finals and Final ====
Quarter-finals
Sheppey United	4
Tunbridge Wells	1
Hythe United	0
Cray Wanderers	2
Deal Town	0 (Note: After extra time)	1 (Note: Replay)
Slade Green	0	2
Herne Bay	2
Greenwich Borough	0

Semi-finals
Sheppey United	1	1 (Note: After extra time, score at 90 minutes 0–1 to Cray Wanderers)	2
Cray Wanderers	0	1	1
Slade Green	2	0 (Note: After extra time, score at 90 minutes 0–1 to Herne Bay)	2
Herne Bay	1	3	4

Final
Sheppey United	1
Herne Bay	3

Sources

- Quarter-finals: "Weekend Results: Winstonlead Kent League: Division 1 Cup, quarter finals". Kent Today. 17 February 1997. p. 35 – via British Newspaper Archive.; "Last night's results: Winstonlead Kent League: Division 1 Cup, quarter-final replay". Kent Today. 19 February 1997. p. 31 – via British Newspaper Archive.
- Semi-finals: "Weekend Results: Winstonlead Kent League: Division 1 Cup, semi final, first leg". Kent Today. 24 March 1997. p. 43 – via British Newspaper Archive.; "Weekend Results: Winstonlead Kent League: Division 1 Cup, semi-final, second leg". Kent Today. 1 April 1997. p. 39 – via British Newspaper Archive.
- Final: "Weekend Results: Winstonlead Kent League: Results: Saturday: Winstonlead Kent League, Division 1 Cup final". Kent Today. 6 May 1997. p. 35 – via British Newspaper Archive.

==== Second Round ====
- Lordswood 1 – 3 Sheppey United
- Canterbury City 0 – 0 (aet) Tunbridge Wells
- REPLAY: Tunbridge Wells 5 – 1 Canterbury City
- Hythe United 4 – 0 Corinthian
- Thamesmead Town 1 – 2 Cray Wanderers
- Deal Town 3 – 0 Beckenham Town
- Furness 1 – 1 (aet) Slade Green (score at 90 minutes: 1–1)
- REPLAY: Slade Green 0 – 0 (aet) Furness. Slade Green won 3–0 on penalties.
- Herne Bay 2 – 0 Woolwich Town
- Greenwich Borough 6 – 0 Folkestone Invicta

==== First Round ====
- Lordswood 2 – 1 Crockenhill
- Sheppey United 5 – 1 Faversham Town
- Slade Green 1 – 0 (aet) Ramsgate
- Herne Bay 3 – 1 Chatham Town
- Greenwich Borough 1 – 0 Whitstable Town
- Byes for the other 11 clubs

Sources:

- Second Round: "Weekend Results: Winstonlead Kent League: Division 1 Cup, second round". Kent Today. 27 January 1997. p. 39 – via British Newspaper Archive.; "Last night's results: Winstonlead Kent League: Division 1 Cup, second round replay". Kent Today. 29 January 1997. p. 31 – via British Newspaper Archive.
- First Round: "Weekend Results: Winstonlead Kent League: Division 1 Cup, First Round". Kent Today. 28 October 1996. p. 35 – via British Newspaper Archive.

== Reserves Section ==
The letter "R" following team names indicates a club’s reserves team.

The 1996–97 Division Two featured reserves teams (which were not permitted in Division One) of clubs from Kent and the adjacent area whose first team played in Division One and other higher ranked leagues. There was a League Cup competition for the teams in the section.

=== Division Two ===
Kent Football League Division Two
- Season: 1996–97
- Champions: Tonbridge AFC R
- Matches: 380
- Goals: 1,412 (3.72 per match)

The division featured 20 clubs, 17 who had competed in the previous season together with three addidtional clubs:

- Dartford R
- Hythe United R
- Lordswood R, joined from the Kent County League Reserves Section

Tonbridge AFC R were the division winners.

==== League table ====
Pos	Team	Pld	W	D	L	GF	GA	GD	Pts
1	Tonbridge AFC R	38	28	6	4	103	41	+62	90
2	Dartford R	38	26	6	6	100	46	+54	81 (Note: Dartford AFC R were deducted three points)
3	Sittingbourne R	38	24	7	7	108	57	+51	76 (Note: Sittingbourne R were deducted three points)
4	Furness R	38	22	7	9	73	38	+35	73
5	Hythe United R	38	18	9	11	76	60	+16	63
6	Deal Town R	38	18	6	14	80	53	+27	60
7	Herne Bay R	38	18	6	14	63	54	+9	60
8	Dover Athletic R	38	18	6	14	62	66	−4	60
9	Lordswood R	38	18	4	16	77	69	+8	58
10	Margate R	38	16	8	14	64	66	−2	53 (Note: Margate R were deducted three points)
11	Hastings Town R	38	13	10	15	80	80	0	49
12	Crockenhill R	38	15	4	19	67	82	−15	49
13	Thamesmead Town R	38	13	9	16	59	65	−6	45 (Note: Thamesmead Town R were deducted three points)
14	Ramsgate R	38	11	11	16	72	90	−18	44
15	Whitstable Town R	38	10	9	19	56	68	−12	39
16	Chatham Town R	38	11	8	19	39	72	−33	38 (Note: Chatham Town R were deducted three points)
17	Beckenham Town R	38	11	5	22	61	97	−36	38
18	Folkestone Invicta R	38	9	6	23	48	100	−52	33
19	Corinthian R	38	6	6	26	49	87	−38	24
20	Faversham Town R	38	6	5	27	75	121	−46	23

Source: "Winstonlead Kent League: Division 2". Kent Messenger. 16 May 1997. p. 58 – via British Newspaper Archive.
Rules for classification: 1) points; 2) goal difference; 3) number of goals scored.

=== Division Two Cup ===
The 1996–97 Kent Football League Division Two Cup was won by East Sussex club Hastings Town R.

The competition for the 20 teams from Division Two comprised five rounds: the first three were a single match knock-out followed by the semi-finals on an aggregate basis (home and away matches) and a single match final on a neutral ground (at Dover Athletic F.C. this season).

==== Quarter-finals, Semi-finals and Final ====
Quarter-finals
Whitstable Town R	1
Margate R	2
Herne Bay R	1
Deal Town R	2
Crockenhill R	0
Hastings Town R	4
Tonbridge AFC R	1 (Note: After extra time, score at 90 minutes: 0–0)
Furness R	3

Semi-finals
Margate R	1	1	2
Deal Town R	4	0	4
Hastings Town R	1	6	7
Furness R	1	2	3

Final
Deal Town R	0
Hastings Town R	1

Sources:

- Quarter-finals: "Weekend Results: Winstonlead Kent League: Division 2 Cup, quarter-finals". Kent Today. 24 February 1997. p. 39 – via British Newspaper Archive.; "Last night's results: Winstonlead Kent League: Division 2 Cup, quarter-finals". Kent Today. 5 March 1997. p. 35 – via British Newspaper Archive.; "Weekend Results: Winstonlead Kent League: Division 2 Cup, quarter-finals". Kent Today. 10 March 1997. p. 35 – via British Newspaper Archive.
- Semi-finals: "Weekend Results: Winstonlead Kent League: Division 2 Cup, semi final, first leg". Kent Today. 24 March 1997. p. 43 – via British Newspaper Archive.; "Weekend Results: Winstonlead Kent League: Division 2 Cup, semi-final, second leg". Kent Today. 1 April 1997. p. 39 – via British Newspaper Archive.
- Final: "Weekend Results: Winstonlead Kent League: Division 2 Cup Final". Kent Today. 21 April 1997. p. 35 – via British Newspaper Archive.

==== Second Round ====
- Hastings Town R 5 – 2 Folkestone Invicta R
- Whitstable Town R 5 – 0 Corinthian R
- Crockenhill R 1 – 0 Hythe United R
- Lordswood R 3 – 3 (aet) Deal Town R (Score at 90 minutes: 3–3)
- REPLAY: Deal Town R v Lordswood R. Result: Deal Town R 1–2(aet) Lordswood R (Score at 90 minutes: 1–1). However, Deal Town R progressed to quarter-final
- Chatham Town R 0 – 2 Margate R
- Herne Bay R 1 – 1 (aet) Ramsgate R (Score at 90 minutes: 1–1)
- REPLAY: Ramsgate R 3 – 0 Herne Bay R
- Thamesmead Town R 1 – 4 Tonbridge AFC R
- Sittingbourne R 1 – 2 (aet) Furness R (Score at 90 minutes: 1–1)

==== First Round ====
- Dover Athletic R 4 – 4 (aet) Thamesmead Town R (Score at 90 minutes: 3–3)
- REPLAY: Thamesmead Town R 1 – 1 (aet) Dover Athletic R. Thamesmead Town R won 3–2 on penalties
- Beckenham Town R 1 – 2 Chatham Town R
- Herne Bay R 2 – 1 Faversham Town R
- Ramsgate R 3 – 1 Dartford R
- Byes for the other 12 clubs

Sources:

- Second Round: "Weekend Results: Winstonlead Kent League: Division 2 Cup, second round". Kent Today. 9 December 1996. p. 39 – via British Newspaper Archive.; "Weekend Results: Winstonlead Kent League: Division 2 Cup, second round". Kent Today. 16 December 1996. p. 39 – via British Newspaper Archive.; "Weekend Results: Winstonlead Kent League: Division 2 Cup, second round". Kent Today. 23 December 1996. p. 35 – via British Newspaper Archive.; "Last night's results: Winstonlead Kent League: Division 2 Cup, second round". Kent Today. 15 January 1997. p. 29 – via British Newspaper Archive.; "Weekend Results: Winstonlead Kent League: Division 2 Cup, second round". Kent Today. 20 January 1997. p. 35 – via British Newspaper Archive.; "Last night's results: Winstonlead Kent League: Division 2 Cup, second round replay". Kent Today. 29 January 1997. p. 31 – via British Newspaper Archive.
- First Round: "Weekend Results: Winstonlead Kent League: Division 2 Cup, first round". Kent Today. 11 November 1996. p. 39 – via British Newspaper Archive.; "Football Results, Fixtures & Tables: Results: Tuesday, November 12: Winstonlead Kent League: Division Two Cup 1st round replay". Dover Express. 14 November 1996. p. 76 – via British Newspaper Archive.
