= 1991–92 Kent Football League =

The 1991–92 Kent Football League season (known as the Winstonlead Kent League for sponsorship reasons) was the 26th in the history of the Kent Football League, a football competition in England, featuring clubs from Kent and the adjacent area.

The League structure comprised two divisions: Division One and Division Two with the latter known as the Reserves Section (reserves teams were not permitted in Division One). Additionally there were two league cup competitions: the Challenge Cup for the Division One clubs and another for the teams in Division Two.

== Division One ==
Kent Football League Division One
- Season: 1991–92
- Champions: Herne Bay
- Matches: 420
- Goals: 1,346 (3.2 per match)

The league season commenced with 22 clubs, of which 20 competed in the previous season together with two additional clubs:

- Corinthian, relegated from the Southern League
- Thamesmead Town, transferred from the Spartan League

Also, Danson, following a merger with Furness F.C., were renamed Danson Furness United.

The Metropolitan Police (Hayes) club, in their eight season in the league, withdrew during the season after playing 16 matches and their record was expunged.

The league was won by Herne Bay.

After the end of the season Thames Polytechnic, who had been league members for seven seasons, were unable to meet enhanced ground grading requirements and resigned from the league and joined the Kent County League.

=== League table ===
Pos	Team	Pld	W	D	L	GF	GA	GD	Pts	Promotion
1	Herne Bay	40	29	6	5	91	34	+57	93	
2	Faversham Town	40	25	11	4	80	33	+47	86	
3	Deal Town	40	26	6	8	119	43	+76	84	
4	Tonbridge AFC	40	26	6	8	93	44	+49	84	
5	Alma Swanley	40	24	11	5	92	49	+43	83	
6	Sheppey United	40	21	11	8	69	44	+25	74	
7	Whitstable Town	40	21	8	11	70	38	+32	71	
8	Slade Green	40	15	12	13	68	56	+12	57	
9	Greenwich Borough	40	15	10	15	77	62	+15	55	
10	Ramsgate	40	16	7	17	62	58	+4	55	
11	Kent Police	40	14	11	15	60	63	−3	53	
12	Tunbridge Wells	40	15	8	17	61	68	−7	53	
13	Corinthian	40	14	8	18	57	62	−5	50	
14	Beckenham Town	40	13	10	17	52	67	−15	49	
15	Thames Polytechnic	40	8	11	21	43	78	−35	35	Resigned to the Kent County League
16	Crockenhill	40	7	13	20	48	83	−35	34	
17	Thamesmead Town	40	9	7	24	44	100	−56	34	
18	Cray Wanderers	40	8	7	25	38	84	−46	31	
19	Chatham Town	40	7	10	23	41	89	−48	31	
20	Danson Furness United	40	8	6	26	39	95	−56	30	
21	Darenth Heathside	40	6	7	27	42	96	−54	25	
22	Metropolitan Police (Hayes)	0	0	0	0	0	0	0	0	Resigned and record expunged

Source: FCHD nonleaguematters
Rules for classification: 1) points; 2) goal difference; 3) number of goals scored.

=== Challenge Cup ===
The 1991–92 Kent Football League Challenge Cup was won by Tonbridge AFC.

The competition was contested by the 22 teams active in Division One in the early part of the season. There were four single match knock-out rounds followed by the final played on a neutral ground (at Dover Athletic F.C. this season).

==== Quarter-finals, Semi-finals and Final ====
Quarter-finals
Thamesmead Town	1
Tonbridge AFC	3
Ramsgate	0 (Note: After extra time; score at 90 minutes 0–0)
Faversham Town	1
Tunbridge Wells	2 (Note: After extra time; score at 90 minutes 2–2)
Whitstable Town	5
Alma Swanley	0
Crockenhill	1

Semi-finals
Tonbridge AFC	2
Faversham Town	1
Whitstable Town	1
Crockenhill	0

Final
Tonbridge AFC	2 (Note: After extra time; score at 90 minutes 1–1)
Whitstable Town	1

Sources:

- "All The Weekend Details: Winstonlead Kent League: Division 1 Cup". Kent Evening Post. 13 January 1992. p. 23 – via British Newspaper Archive.
- "All The Weekend Details: Winstonlead Kent League: Division 1 Cup, semi-finals". Kent Evening Post. 9 March 1992. p. 23 – via British Newspaper Archive.
- "All The Weekend Details: Winstonlead Kent League: Division 1 Cup final". Kent Evening Post. 27 April 1992. p. 23 – via British Newspaper Archive.

==== Second Round ====
- Cray Wanderers 1 – 2 (aet) Thamesmead Town (Score at 90 minutes: 1–1)
- Beckenham Town 0 – 2 Tonbridge AFC
- Ramsgate 3 – 2 (aet) Darenth Heathside (Score at 90 minutes: 1–1)
- Metropolitan Police (Hayes) 0 – 3 Faversham Town
- Tunbridge Wells 1 – 0 Herne Bay
- Whitstable Town 4 – 1 Corinthian
- Deal Town 1 – 2 (aet) Alma Swanley (Score at 90 minutes: 1–1)
- Crockenhill 3 – 0 (aet) Thames Polytechnic (Score at 90 minutes: 0–0)

==== First Round ====
- Greenwich Borough 0 – 2 Thamesmead Town
- Beckenham Town 1 – 0 Danson Furness United
- Kent Police 1 –2 Darenth Heathside
- Sheppey United 0 – 0 (aet) Whitstable Town
- REPLAY: Whitstable Town 2 – 2 (aet), (P: 6–5) Sheppey United (Score at 90 minutes: 2–2, Whitstable Town won 6–5 on penalties)
- Slade Green 2 – 3 Corinthian
- Crockenhill 3 – 3 (aet) Chatham Town (Score at 90 minutes: 3–3)
- REPLAY: Chatham Town 0 – 4 Crockenhill

Byes for the other 10 teams

== Reserves Section ==
The letter "R" following team names indicates a club’s reserves team.

The 1991–92 Division Two featured one first team (Folkestone Invicta) and 18 reserves teams (which were not permitted in Division One) from clubs whose first team played in Division One and other higher ranked leagues. There was a League Cup competition for the teams in the section.

=== Division Two ===
Kent Football League Division Two
- Season: 1991–92
- Champions: Folkestone Invicta
- Matches: 342
- Goals: 1,349 (3.94 per match)

The division featured 19 clubs, 14 who had competed in the previous season together with five additional clubs:

- Folkestone Invicta, joining from the Kent County League.
- Thamesmead Town R
- Chatham Town R
- Darenth Heathside R
- Hythe Town R

Folkestone Invicta, the only first team in the division, were the division winners and completed the League and Cup double.

At the end of the season seven teams left the division: Ashford Town R, Faversham Town R, Hythe Town R, Sheppey United R, Sittingbourne R and Thames Polytechnic R resigned from the division; and Folkestone Invicta moved to Division One and were replaced by their reserves team.

==== League table ====
Pos	Team	Pld	W	D	L	GF	GA	GD	Pts	Season End Notes
1	Folkestone Invicta	36	29	5	2	122	33	+89	92	Resigned, replaced by reserves team
2	Dover Athletic R	36	27	4	5	114	30	+84	85	
3	Hastings Town R	36	24	4	8	117	46	+71	76	
4	Ashford Town R	36	19	6	11	59	45	+14	63	Resigned
5	Sittingbourne R	36	20	7	9	109	51	+58	61 (Note: Sittingbourne: six points deducted (additionally 11 goals were deducted but these have been added back here))	Resigned
6	Deal Town R	36	16	5	15	84	87	−3	53	
7	Herne Bay R	36	16	4	16	70	86	−16	52	
8	Whitstable Town R	36	15	6	15	61	62	−1	51	
9	Ramsgate R	36	15	5	16	64	66	−2	47 (Note: Ramsgate: three points deducted (additionally 2 goals were deducted but these have been added back here))	
10	Thames Polytechnic R	36	14	5	17	62	70	−8	47	Resigned
11	Cray Wanderers R	36	13	8	15	58	66	−8	47	
12	Darenth Heathside R	36	13	6	17	63	79	−16	45	
13	Canterbury City R	36	12	6	18	63	84	−21	42	
14	Chatham Town R	36	10	11	15	49	65	−16	41	
15	Thamesmead Town R	36	11	7	18	53	74	−21	40	
16	Sheppey United R	36	11	6	19	60	89	−29	39	Resigned
17	Beckenham Town R	36	8	5	23	51	83	−32	29	
18	Faversham Town R	36	6	7	23	41	95	−54	25	Resigned
19	Hythe Town R	36	8	3	25	49	138	−89	24 (Note: Hythe: three points deducted (additionally 5 goals were deducted but these have been added back here))	Resigned

Source: Sources:
- Final Table: "Winstonlead Kent League: How They Finished: Division 2". Kent Today: KM Group: Get Set for Soccer supplement. 12 August 1992. p. 9 – via British Newspaper Archive.;
- Points/Goals deductions:"Football Results Round Up Fixtures and Tables: Winstonlead Kent League: Division Two". Dover Express. 25 October 1991. p. 62 – via British Newspaper Archive.; "Football Results Round Up Fixtures and Tables: Winstonlead Kent League: Division Two". Dover Express. 1 November 1991. p. 62 – via British Newspaper Archive.; "Football Results Round Up Fixtures and Tables: Winstonlead Kent League: Division Two". Dover Express. 20 December 1991. p. 46 – via British Newspaper Archive.; "Football Results Round Up Fixtures and Tables: Winstonlead Kent League: Division Two". Dover Express. 27 December 1991. p. 35 – via British Newspaper Archive.; "Football Results Round Up Fixtures and Tables: Winstonlead Kent League: Division Two". Dover Express. 17 April 1992. p. 70 – via British Newspaper Archive.; "Football Results Round Up Fixtures and Tables: Winstonlead Kent League: Division Two". Dover Express. 24 April 1992. p. 62 – via British Newspaper Archive..
  Rules for classification: 1) points; 2) goal difference; 3) number of goals scored.
  Notes:

=== Division Two Cup ===
The 1991–92 Kent Football League Division Two Cup was won by Folkestone Invicta who completed the League and Cup double.

The competition was contested by the 19 teams from Division Two over four single match knock-out rounds followed by the final played on a neutral ground (at Faversham Town F.C. this season).

==== Quarter-finals, Semi-finals and Final ====
Quarter-finals
Dover Athletic R	5
Sheppey United R	1
Canterbury City R	1
Folkestone Invicta	3
Thamesmead Town R
Ashford Town R
Whitstable Town R	5
Ramsgate R	2

Semi-finals
Dover Athletic R	0
Folkestone Invicta	3
Ashford Town R	0
Whitstable Town R	2

Final
Folkestone Invicta	1
Whitstable Town R	0

Sources:

- "All The Weekend Details: Winstonlead Kent League: Division 2 Cup". Kent Evening Post. 13 January 1992. p. 23 – via British Newspaper Archive.
- "Last night's soccer: Winstonlead Kent League: Division 2 Cup". Kent Evening Post. 29 January 1992. p. 22 – via British Newspaper Archive.
- "All The Weekend Details: Winstonlead Kent League: Division 2 Cup". Kent Evening Post. 3 February 1992. p. 23 – via British Newspaper Archive.
- "All The Weekend Details: Winstonlead Kent League: Division 2 Cup, semi-finals". Kent Evening Post. 23 March 1992. p. 27 – via British Newspaper Archive.
- "Last night's soccer: Winstonlead Kent League: Division 2 Cup final". Kent Evening Post. 24 April 1992. p. 27 – via British Newspaper Archive.

==== Second Round ====
- Dover Athletic R 2 – 0 Herne Bay R
- Chatham Town R 3 – 5 (aet) Sheppey United R (Score at 90 minutes: 3–3)
- Canterbury City R 3 –2 Hastings Town R
- Folkestone Invicta 12 – 0 Beckenham Town R
- Thamesmead Town R 4 –4 (aet) Cray Wanderers R
- REPLAY: Cray Wanderers R 4 – 5 Thamesmead Town R
- Darenth Heathside R 0 –1 Ashford Town R
- Whitstable Town R 1 – 0 (aet) Hythe Town R
- Thames Polytechnic R 3 – 4 Ramsgate R

==== First Round ====
- Faversham Town R 1 – 2 Dover Athletic R
- Deal Town R 0 –5 Hastings Town R
- Sittingbourne R 3 – 4 (aet) Folkestone Invicta (Score at 90 minutes: 3–3)

Byes for the other 13 teams
