= 1995–96 Kent Football League =

The 1995–96 Kent Football League season (known as the Winstonlead Kent League for sponsorship reasons) was the 30th in the history of the Kent Football League, a football competition in England.

The League structure comprised two divisions: Division One and Division Two with the latter known as the Reserves Section (reserves teams were not permitted in Division One). Additionally there were two league cup competitions: the Challenge Cup for the Division One clubs and another for the teams in Division Two.

== Division One ==
Kent Football League Division One
- Season: 1995–96
- Champions: Furness
- Promoted: Dartford
- Matches: 380
- Goals: 1,266 (3.33 per match)

The league featured 20 clubs, 19 of which competed in the previous season together with one additional club:

- Hythe United, joined from the Kent County League

Furness won the division and the league Challenge Cup too, for the only occasions during their tenure in the league.

After spending three seasons in the Kent League Dartford took promotion and returned to the Southern League.

=== League table ===
Pos	Team	Pld	W	D	L	GF	GA	GD	Pts	Promotion
1	Furness	38	27	8	3	87	19	+68	89	
2	Dartford	38	26	11	1	71	21	+50	89	Promoted to the Southern League Southern Division
3	Chatham Town	38	24	5	9	79	48	+31	77	
4	Herne Bay	38	18	10	10	74	44	+30	64	
5	Deal Town	38	17	13	8	72	52	+20	64	
6	Slade Green	38	17	12	9	66	46	+20	63	
7	Sheppey United	38	19	5	14	66	49	+17	62	
8	Whitstable Town	38	17	7	14	85	61	+24	58	
9	Thamesmead Town	38	17	7	14	59	51	+8	58	
10	Folkestone Invicta	38	15	11	12	82	56	+26	56	
11	Greenwich Borough	38	15	7	16	60	66	−6	52	
12	Cray Wanderers	38	16	5	17	70	70	0	50 (Note: Cray Wanderers were deducted three points.)	
13	Canterbury City	38	14	6	18	48	59	−11	48	
14	Ramsgate	38	13	6	19	62	81	−19	45	
15	Tunbridge Wells	38	10	10	18	45	64	−19	40	
16	Beckenham Town	38	9	9	20	45	60	−15	36	
17	Corinthian	38	9	7	22	53	84	−31	34	
18	Crockenhill	38	8	8	22	51	92	−41	32	
19	Hythe United	38	8	6	24	58	101	−43	30	
20	Faversham Town	38	3	3	32	33	142	−109	12	

Source: FCHD nonleaguematters
Rules for classification: 1) points; 2) goal difference; 3) number of goals scored.

=== Challenge Cup ===
The 1995–96 Kent Football League Challenge Cup was won by Furness, who completed a League and Cup double.

The competition was contested by the 20 teams from Division One over five rounds: the first three were a single match knock-out followed by the semi-finals on an aggregate basis (home and away matches) and the final match played on a neutral ground (at Sittingbourne F.C. this season).

==== Quarter-finals, Semi-finals and Final ====
Quarter-finals
Crockenhill	1
Furness	6
Chatham Town	1 (Note: After extra time (score at 90 minutes: 1-1))	1 (Note: Replay, after extra time (score at 90 minutes: 1-1))
Whitstable Town	1	3
Sheppey United	2
Tunbridge Wells	0
Slade Green	2
Corinthian	0

Semi-finals
Furness	1	3	4
Whitstable Town	1	0	1
Sheppey United	1	2 (Note: After extra time (score at 90 minutes: 1–1))	3
Slade Green	1	1	2

Final
Furness	2 (Note: After extra time (score at 90 minutes: 1–1))
Sheppey United	1

Sources:

- Quarter-finals: "Senior soccer details: Results: Saturday: Winstonlead Kent League: Division 1 Cup, quarter-finals". Kentish Gazette. 25 January 1996. p. 46 – via British Newspaper Archive.; "Results, fixtures: Results: Tuesday: Winstonlead Kent League: Division 1 Cup, quarter-final replay". Kentish Gazette. 1 February 1996. p. 47 – via British Newspaper Archive.
- Semi-finals: "Weekend Results: Winstonlead Kent League: Division 1 Cup, semi-inal first leg". Kent Today. 18 March 1996. p. 29 – via British Newspaper Archive.; "Weekend Results: Winstonlead Kent League: Division 1 Cup, semi-finals, second leg". Kent Today. 25 March 1996. p. 29 – via British Newspaper Archive.
- Final: "Weekend Results: Winstonlead Kent League: Division 1 Cup final". Kent Today. 7 May 1996. p. 33 – via British Newspaper Archive.

==== Second Round ====
- Crockenhill 1 – 1 (aet) Greenwich Borough (match abandoned after 106 minutes)
- REPLAY: Greenwich Borough 1 – 1 (aet) Crockenhill (score after 90 minutes 1-1),Crockenhill won 3–2 on penalties
- Cray Wanderers 1 – 2 Furness
- Beckenham Town 0 – 2 Chatham Town
- Whitstable Town 2 – 1 Folkestone Invicta
- Sheppey United 3 – 2 Deal Town
- Hythe United 1 – 2 (aet) Tunbridge Wells (Score at 90 minutes: 1–1)
- Slade Green 4 – 2 Thamesmead Town
- Corinthian 5 – 5 (aet) Ramsgate (Score at 90 minutes: 4–4)
- REPLAY: Ramsgate 1 – 4 Corinthian

==== First Round ====
- Dartford 0 – 2 Cray Wanderers
- Canterbury City 4 – 5 Folkestone Invicta
- Beckenham Town 2 – 1 Faversham Town
- Whitstable Town 2 – 1 Herne Bay
- Byes for the other 12 teams

Sources:

- Second Round: "Weekend Results: Winstonlead Kent League: Division 1 Cup, second round". Kent Today. 27 November 1995. p. 33 – via British Newspaper Archive.; "Last night's results: Winstonlead Kent League: Division 1 Cup, second round replay". Kent Today. 29 November 1995. p. 31 – via British Newspaper Archive.; "Senior soccer details: Results: Saturday: Winstonlead Kent League: Division 1 Cup, second round replay". Kentish Gazette. 20 December 1995. p. 38 – via British Newspaper Archive.
- First Round: "Weekend Results: Winstonlead Kent League: Division 1 Cup". Kent Today. 23 October 1995. p. 29 – via British Newspaper Archive.; "Results: Winstonlead Kent League: Division 1 Cup, first round". Kent Today. 30 October 1995. p. 29 – via British Newspaper Archive.

== Reserves Section ==
The letter "R" following team names indicates a club’s reserves team.

The 1995–96 Division Two featured teams from Kent and the adjacent area, it included the Kent Police team and 18 others that were reserves teams (which were not permitted in Division One) from clubs whose first team played in Division One and other higher ranked leagues. There was a League Cup competition for the teams in the section.

=== Division Two ===
Kent Football League Division Two
- Season: 1995–96
- Champions: Hastings Town R
- Matches: 342
- Goals: 1,456 (4.26 per match)

The division featured 19 clubs, 15 who had competed in the previous season together with four addidtional clubs:

- Kent Police, dropped from Division One
- Margate R
- Sittingbourne R
- Crockenhill R

Hastings Town R (based in East Sussex) were the division winners.

At the end of the season Canterbury City R and Kent Police left the league, the latter had been members of the Kent League for 27 seasons since 1969–70.

==== League table ====
Pos	Team	Pld	W	D	L	GF	GA	GD	Pts	Season End Notes
1	Hastings Town R	36	26	6	4	127	49	+78	84	
2	Furness R	36	24	5	7	121	36	+85	77	
3	Dover Athletic R	36	23	5	8	104	52	+52	74	
4	Tonbridge AFC R	36	22	7	7	108	48	+60	73	
5	Whitstable Town R	36	22	5	9	107	46	+61	71	
6	Sittingbourne R	36	22	4	10	127	57	+70	70	
7	Thamesmead Town R	36	18	6	12	63	48	+15	60	
8	Folkestone Invicta R	36	18	6	12	84	73	+11	60	
9	Chatham Town R	36	15	10	11	56	59	−3	55	
10	Corinthian R	36	16	4	16	63	58	+5	52	
11	Beckenham Town R	36	15	7	14	62	67	−5	52	
12	Ramsgate R	36	14	4	18	79	84	−5	46	
13	Margate R	36	10	9	17	57	76	−19	39	
14	Herne Bay R	36	12	3	21	49	86	−37	39	
15	Deal Town R	36	12	3	21	73	114	−41	39	
16	Canterbury City R	36	11	5	20	58	86	−28	38	Resigned from League
17	Crockenhill R	36	6	4	26	49	104	−55	22	
18	Faversham Town R	36	5	3	28	41	138	−97	18	
19	Kent Police	36	2	2	32	28	175	−147	8	Resigned from League

Source: "Tables: Winstonlead Kent League: Division 2". Kent Messenger. 10 May 1996. p. 63 – via British Newspaper Archive.
Rules for classification: 1) points; 2) goal difference; 3) number of goals scored.

=== Division Two Cup ===
The 1995–96 Kent Football League Division Two Cup was won by Folkestone Invicta R

The competition for the 19 teams from Division Two comprised five rounds: the first three were a single match knock-out followed by the semi-finals on an aggregate basis (home and away matches) and a single match final on a neutral ground (at Hythe United F.C. this season).

==== Quarter-finals, Semi-finals and Final ====
Quarter-finals
Chatham Town R	1 (Note: After extra time (score at 90 minutes: 0-0))
Whitstable Town R	2
Kent Police	0
Dover Athletic R	3
Corinthian R	3
Hastings Town R	4
Folkestone Invicta R	2
Tonbridge AFC R	0

Semi-finals
Whitstable Town R	0	1	1
Dover Athletic R	1	1	2
Hastings Town R	2	0	2
Folkestone Invicta R	3	1	4

Final
Dover Athletic R	0
Folkestone Invicta R	2

Sources:

- Quarter-finals: "Senior soccer details: Results: Saturday: Winstonlead Kent League: Division 2 Cup, third round". Kentish Gazette. 8 February 1996. p. 46 – via British Newspaper Archive.; "Senior soccer details: Results: Saturday: Winstonlead Kent League: Division 2 Cup, third round". Kentish Gazette. 15 February 1996. p. 46 – via British Newspaper Archive.; "Senior soccer: Results:Tuesday: Winstonlead Kent League: Division 2 Cup, third round". Kentish Gazette. 29 February 1996. p. 46 – via British Newspaper Archive.
- Semi-finals: "Senior soccer details: Results: Saturday: Winstonlead Kent League: Division 2 Cup, semi-final, first leg". Kentish Gazette. 21 March 1996. p. 54 – via British Newspaper Archive.; "Senior soccer details: Results: Saturday: Winstonlead Kent League: Division 2 Cup, semi-final, second leg". Kentish Gazette. 28 March 1996. p. 54 – via British Newspaper Archive.; "Last night's results: Winstonlead Kent League: Division 2 Cup, semi-final, first leg". Kent Today. 28 March 1996. p. 35 – via British Newspaper Archive.; "Last night's results:Winstonlead Kent League: Division 2 Cup, semi-final, second leg". Kent Today. 3 April 1996. p. 27 – via British Newspaper Archive.
- Final: "Senior soccer details: Results: Saturday: Winstonlead Kent League: Division 2 Cup final". Kentish Gazette. 2 May 1996. p. 54 – via British Newspaper Archive.

==== Second Round ====
- Chatham Town R 2 – 0 Thamesmead Town R
- Whitstable Town R 2 – 0 Sittingbourne R
- Margate R 1 – 2 Kent Police
- Furness R 0 – 2 Dover Athletic R
- Corinthian R 2 – 0 Deal Town R
- Beckenham Town R 1 – 4 Hastings Town R
- Herne Bay R 2 – 4 Folkestone Invicta R
- Faversham Town R 0 – 4 Tonbridge AFC R

==== First Round ====
- Chatham Town R 4 – 0 Ramsgate R
- Whitstable Town R 6 – 1 Crockenhill R
- Canterbury City R 0 – 4 Furness R
- Byes for other 13 clubs

Sources:

- Second Round: "Weekend Results: Winstonlead Kent League: Division 2 Cup, second round". Kent Today. 27 November 1995. p. 33 – via British Newspaper Archive.; "Last night's results:Winstonlead Kent League: Division 2 Cup, second round". Kent Today. 29 November 1995. p. 31 – via British Newspaper Archive.; "Senior soccer details: Results: Saturday: Division 2 Cup, second round". Kentish Gazette. 7 December 1995. p. 34 – via British Newspaper Archive.; "Results, fixtures & Tables: Results: Saturday: Winstonlead Kent League: Division 2 Cup, second round". Kentish Gazette. 11 January 1996. p. 46 – via British Newspaper Archive.; "Senior soccer details: Results: Saturday: Winstonlead Kent League: Division 2 Cup, third round: Second Round". Kentish Gazette. 8 February 1996. p. 46 – via British Newspaper Archive.
- First Round: "(Column 5) Winstonlead Kent League: Division 2 Cup, first round". Kent Today. 16 October 1995. p. 29 – via British Newspaper Archive.; "Results: Winstonlead Kent League: Division 2 Cup, first round". Kent Today. 30 October 1995. p. 33 – via British Newspaper Archive.
