= 1993–94 Kent Football League =

The 1993–94 Kent Football League season (known as the Winstonlead Kent League for sponsorship reasons) was the 28th in the history of the Kent Football League, a football competition in England.

The League structure comprised two divisions: Division One and Division Two with the latter known as the Reserves Section (reserves teams were not permitted in Division One). Additionally there were two league cup competitions: the Challenge Cup for the Division One clubs and another for the teams in Division Two.

== Division One ==
Kent Football League Division One
- Season: 1993–94
- Champions: Herne Bay
- Matches: 420
- Goals: 1,519 (3.62 per match)

The league featured 21 clubs, 20 which had competed in the previous season together with one additional club:

- Dartford, the reformed club were a continuation of the club that had resigned early the previous season from the Southern League

Also, Danson Furness United changed name to Furness.

The league was won by Herne Bay for their second title.

Former division champions and cup winners Alma Swanley folded and resigned from the league at the end of the season.

=== League table ===
Pos	Team	Pld	W	D	L	GF	GA	GD	Pts	Season End Notes
1	Herne Bay	40	33	4	3	102	26	+76	103	
2	Furness	40	23	9	8	94	37	+57	78	
3	Chatham Town	40	23	9	8	86	50	+36	78	
4	Thamesmead Town	40	21	11	8	93	47	+46	74	
5	Alma Swanley	40	22	8	10	90	50	+40	74	Resigned (club folded)
6	Dartford	40	21	11	8	70	44	+26	74	
7	Beckenham Town	40	22	4	14	85	59	+26	70	
8	Corinthian	40	21	6	13	91	51	+40	69	
9	Ramsgate	40	20	6	14	90	67	+23	66	
10	Deal Town	40	18	8	14	102	73	+29	62	
11	Sheppey United	40	17	10	13	69	67	+2	61	
12	Folkestone Invicta	40	17	6	17	83	73	+10	57	
13	Faversham Town	40	14	6	20	68	80	−12	48	
14	Greenwich Borough	40	14	5	21	72	85	−13	47	
15	Whitstable Town	40	12	9	19	68	72	−4	45	
16	Tunbridge Wells	40	11	10	19	54	71	−17	43	
17	Cray Wanderers	40	11	9	20	37	65	−28	42	
18	Crockenhill	40	8	10	22	55	99	−44	33 (Note: Crockenhill were deducted one point.)	
19	Slade Green	40	8	7	25	42	87	−45	31	
20	Darenth Heathside	40	5	4	31	38	128	−90	19	
21	Kent Police	40	1	4	35	30	188	−158	7	

Source: FCHD nonleaguematters
Rules for classification: 1) points; 2) goal difference; 3) number of goals scored.

=== Challenge Cup ===
The 1993–94 Kent Football League Challenge Cup was won for the second consecutive season by Ramsgate – the first club to retain the League Challenge Cup since its reintroduction in 1967.

The competition was contested by the 21 teams from Division One over five rounds: the first three were a single match knock-out followed by the semi-finals on an aggregate basis (home and away matches) and the final match played on a neutral ground (at Whitstable Town F.C. this season).

==== Quarter-finals, Semi-finals and Final ====
Quarter-finals
Deal Town	7
Cray Wanderers	2
Whitstable Town	2 (Note: After extra time; score at 90 minutes 1–1)
Herne Bay	1
Folkestone Invicta	0
Thamesmead Town	2
Ramsgate	9
Crockenhill	1

Semi-finals
Deal Town	3	0	3
Whitstable Town	0	0	0
Thamesmead Town	1	2	3
Ramsgate	4	1	5

Final
Deal Town	1
Ramsgate	2

Sources:

- Quarter-finals: "Results Check: Saturday 8 January: Winstonlead Kent League Cup: Division One Cup". Herne Bay Times. 13 January 1994. p. 27 – via British Newspaper Archive.; "Results Check: Saturday 22 January: Winstonlead Kent League Cup: Division One Cup". Herne Bay Times. 27 January 1994. p. 31 – via British Newspaper Archive.; "Results Check: Tuesday 1 February: Winstonlead Kent League Cup: Division One Cup". Herne Bay Times. 3 February 1994. p. 27 – via British Newspaper Archive.
- Semi-finals: "Results Check: Saturday 5 March: Winstonlead Kent League Cup: Semi finals first leg". Herne Bay Times. 10 March 1994. p. 27 – via British Newspaper Archive.; "Results Check: Saturday 12 March: Winstonlead Kent League Cup: Semi Finals Second Leg". Herne Bay Times. 17 March 1994. p. 27 – via British Newspaper Archive.
- Final: "Football Results & Fixtures Service: Results: Saturday: Winstonlead Kent League Division One Cup Final". Dover Express. 28 April 1994. p. 104 – via British Newspaper Archive.

==== Second Round ====
- Greenwich Borough 1 – 2 Deal Town
- Tunbridge Wells 2 – 5 Folkestone Invicta
- Alma Swanley 0 – 1 Herne Bay
- Corinthian 1 – 2 Crockenhill
- Darenth Heathside 0 – 4 Cray Wanderers
- Ramsgate 3 – 1 Furness
- Thamesmead Town 3 – 2 Beckenham Town
- Whitstable Town 3 – 0 Sheppey United

Source:"Football Results & Fixtures Service: Results: Saturday: Winstonlead Kent League: Division One Cup". Dover Express. 11 November 1993. p. 71 – via British Newspaper Archive.

==== First Round ====
- Chatham Town 0 – 1 Thamesmead Town
- Crockenhill 2 – 1 Slade Green
- Dartford 1 – 2 Whitstable Town
- Faversham Town 1 – 2 Corinthian
- Folkestone Invicta 2 – 0 Kent Police
- Byes for the other 11 teams

Source:"Football Results & Fixtures Service: Results: Saturday: Winstonlead Kent League: Division One Cup 1st Round". Dover Express. 23 September 1993. p. 71 – via British Newspaper Archive.

== Reserves Section ==
The letter "R" following team names indicates a club's reserves team.

The 1993–94 Division Two featured reserves teams (which were not permitted in Division One) from clubs from Kent and the adjacent area whose first team played in Division One and other higher ranked leagues. There was a League Cup competition for the teams in the section.

=== Division Two ===
Kent Football League Division Two
- Season: 1993–94
- Champions: Dover Athletic R
- Matches: 156
- Goals: 527 (3.38 per match)

The division featured 13 of the clubs who had competed in the previous season.

Dover Athletic R, for the second consecutive season, were the division winners and completed a Division Two League and Cup double.

At the end of the season Darenth Heathside R resigned from the division.

==== League table ====
Pos	Team	Pld	W	D	L	GF	GA	GD	Pts	Season End Notes
1	Dover Athletic R	24	17	4	3	56	15	+41	55	
2	Herne Bay R	24	17	3	4	51	25	+26	54	
3	Thamesmead Town R	24	13	6	5	53	27	+26	45	
4	Whitstable Town R	24	11	9	4	43	26	+17	41 (Note: Whitstable were deducted one point)	
5	Tonbridge AFC R	24	11	3	10	47	30	+17	36	
6	Hastings Town R	24	9	8	7	52	50	+2	35	
7	Folkestone Invicta R	24	8	5	11	44	51	−7	29	
8	Beckenham Town R	24	7	6	11	42	50	−8	27	
9	Chatham Town R	24	7	5	12	30	44	−14	26	
10	Deal Town R	24	7	1	16	26	62	−36	22	
11	Darenth Heathside R	24	5	6	13	31	43	−12	21	Resigned
12	Canterbury City R	24	5	6	13	30	55	−25	21	
13	Ramsgate R	24	5	6	13	22	49	−27	21	

Source: "Fitting end to fine season: Winstonlead Kent League: Division Two". Whitstable Times. 12 May 1994. p. 27 – via British Newspaper Archive.
Rules for classification: 1) points; 2) goal difference; 3) number of goals scored.

=== Division Two Cup ===
The 1993–94 Kent Football League Division Two Cup was won by Dover Athletic R who completed a Division Two League and Cup double.

The competition for the 13 teams from Division Two comprised a group phase (with four sections) with the group winners progressing to home and away aggregate semi-finals followed by the final match played on a neutral ground (at Chatham Town F.C. this season).

==== Semi-finals and Final ====
Semi-finals
Herne Bay R	3	-	x (Note: Dover Athletic R awarded tie; Herne Bay R disqualified for playing ineligible player in first leg match)
Dover Athletic R	3	-	W
Thamesmead Town R	0	0	0
Tonbridge AFC R	0	1	1

Final
Dover Athletic R	4
Tonbridge AFC R	2

Sources:

- Semi-finals: "Football Results & Fixtures Service: Results: Saturday: Winstonlead Kent League: Division Two: Cup S/F First Leg". Dover Express. 17 March 1994. p. 91 – via British Newspaper Archive.; "Football Results & Fixtures Service: Results: Saturday: Winstonlead Kent League: Division Two Cup Semi-final". Dover Express. 24 March 1994. p. 96 – via British Newspaper Archive.; "Football Results & Fixtures Service: Results: Saturday: Winstonlead Kent League: Division Two Cup S/Final". Dover Express. 31 March 1994. p. 107 – via British Newspaper Archive.
- Final: "Deadly Fox delivers dream Dover double". Dover Express. 12 May 1994. p. 114 – via British Newspaper Archive.

==== Group Phase ====
Group A

Pos	Team	Pld	W	D	L	GF	GA	GD	Pts	Group Notes
1	Thamesmead Town R	4	3	1	0	14	4	+10	10	Qualified for semi-final
2	Beckenham Town R	4	2	1	1	11	6	+5	7	
3	Darenth Heathside R	4	0	0	4	1	16	−15	0	

Source: Compiled from Results Grid (sources identified)
Rules for classification: 1) points; 2) goal difference; 3) number of goals scored.

Home \ Away	BEC	DHE	THA
Beckenham Town R		3–0	2–2
Darenth Heathside R	0–5		1–5
Thamesmead Town R	4–1	3–0	

Source: Results sources: "Football Results & Fixtures Service: Results: Saturday: Winstonlead Kent League: Division Two: Division Two Cup". Dover Express. 4 November 1993. p. 70 – via British Newspaper Archive.; "Football Results & Fixtures Service: Results: Saturday: Winstonlead Kent League: Division Two: Division Two Cup". Dover Express. 11 November 1993. p. 71 – via British Newspaper Archive.; "Football Results & Fixtures Service: Results: Saturday: Winstonlead Kent League: Division Two: Division Two Cup". Dover Express. 18 November 1993. p. 71 – via British Newspaper Archive.; "Football Results & Fixtures Service: Results: Saturday: Winstonlead Kent League: Division Two: Division Two Cup". Folkestone Herald. 16 December 1993. p. 63 – via British Newspaper Archive.; "Football Results & Fixtures Service: Results: Saturday: Winstonlead Kent League: Division Two: Division Two Cup". Dover Express. 23 December 1993. p. 50 – via British Newspaper Archive.; "Football Results & Fixtures Service: Results: Saturday: Winstonlead Kent League: Division Two: Division Two Cup". Dover Express. 17 February 1994. p. 61 – via British Newspaper Archive.
Legend: Blue = home team win; Yellow = draw; Red = away team win.

Group B

Pos	Team	Pld	W	D	L	GF	GA	GD	Pts	Group Notes
1	Tonbridge AFC R	4	2	1	1	9	10	−1	7	Qualified for semi-final
2	Folkestone Invicta R	4	1	2	1	11	9	+2	5	
3	Hastings Town R	4	1	1	2	7	8	−1	4	

Source: Compiled from Results Grid (sources identified)
Rules for classification: 1) points; 2) goal difference; 3) number of goals scored.

Home \ Away	FOL	HAS	TON
Folkestone Invicta R		1–1	5–1
Hastings Town R	4–2		1–2
Tonbridge AFC R	3–3	3–1	

Source: Results sources: "Football Results & Fixtures Service: Results: Saturday: Winstonlead Kent League: Division Two: Division Two Cup". Dover Express. 21 October 1993. p. 71 – via British Newspaper Archive.; "Kent League: Tuesday November 2: Division two Cup". Herne Bay Times. 4 November 1993. p. 31 – via British Newspaper Archive.; "Football Results & Fixtures Service: Results: Saturday: Winstonlead Kent League: Division Two: Division Two Cup". Dover Express. 18 November 1993. p. 71 – via British Newspaper Archive.; "Football Results & Fixtures Service: Results: Saturday: Winstonlead Kent League: Division Two: Division Two Cup". Dover Express. 25 November 1993. p. 63 – via British Newspaper Archive.; "Football Results & Fixtures Service: Results: Saturday: Winstonlead Kent League: Division Two: Division Two Cup". Dover Express. 23 December 1993. p. 50 – via British Newspaper Archive.; "Football Results & Fixtures Service: Results: Saturday: Winstonlead Kent League: Division Two: Division Two Cup". Dover Express. 6 January 1994. p. 55 – via British Newspaper Archive.
Legend: Blue = home team win; Yellow = draw; Red = away team win.

Group C

Pos	Team	Pld	W	D	L	GF	GA	GD	Pts	Group Notes
1	Herne Bay R	4	3	0	1	9	4	+5	9	Qualified for semi-final
2	Whitstable Town R	4	2	0	2	5	5	0	6	
3	Chatham Town R	4	1	0	3	3	8	−5	3	

Source: Compiled from Results Grid (sources identified)
Rules for classification: 1) points; 2) goal difference; 3) number of goals scored.

Home \ Away	CHA	HER	WHI
Chatham Town R		2–1	0–3
Herne Bay R	3–1		2–1
Whitstable Town R	1–0	0–3	

Source: Results sources: "Football Results & Fixtures Service: Results: Saturday: Winstonlead Kent League: Division Two: Division Two Cup". Dover Express. 21 October 1993. p. 71 – via British Newspaper Archive.; "Football Results & Fixtures Service: Results: Saturday: Winstonlead Kent League: Division Two: Division Two Cup". Dover Express. 4 November 1993. p. 70 – via British Newspaper Archive.; "Football Results & Fixtures Service: Results: Saturday: Winstonlead Kent League: Division Two: Division Two Cup". Dover Express. 11 November 1993. p. 71 – via British Newspaper Archive.; "Football Results & Fixtures Service: Results: Saturday: Winstonlead Kent League: Division Two: Division Two Cup". Dover Express. 18 November 1993. p. 71 – via British Newspaper Archive.; "Football Results & Fixtures Service: Results: Saturday: Winstonlead Kent League: Division Two: Division Two Cup". Dover Express. 25 November 1993. p. 63 – via British Newspaper Archive.; "Football Results & Fixtures Service: Results: Saturday: Winstonlead Kent League: Division Two: Division Two Cup". Folkestone Herald. 16 December 1993. p. 63 – via British Newspaper Archive.
Legend: Blue = home team win; Yellow = draw; Red = away team win.

Group D

Pos	Team	Pld	W	D	L	GF	GA	GD	Pts	Group Notes
1	Dover Athletic R	6	6	0	0	31	0	+31	18	Qualified for semi-final
2	Deal Town R	6	2	1	3	13	15	−2	7	
3	Ramsgate R	6	2	0	4	5	16	−11	6	
4	Canterbury City R	6	1	1	4	6	24	−18	4	

Source: Compiled from Results Grid (sources identified)
Rules for classification: 1) points; 2) goal difference; 3) number of goals scored.

Home \ Away	CAN	DEA	DOV	RAM
Canterbury City R		2–2	0–7	2–1
Deal Town R	4–1		0–2	6–0
Dover Athletic R	8–0	8–0		2–0
Ramsgate R	2–1	2–1	0–4	

Source: Results sources: "Football Results & Fixtures Service: Results: Saturday: Winstonlead Kent League: Division Two: Division Two Cup". Dover Express. 21 October 1993. p. 71 – via British Newspaper Archive.; "Football Results & Fixtures Service: Results: Saturday: Winstonlead Kent League: Division Two: Division Two Cup". Dover Express. 28 October 1993. p. 62 – via British Newspaper Archive.; "Football Results & Fixtures Service: Results: Saturday: Winstonlead Kent League: Division Two: Division Two Cup". Dover Express. 4 November 1993. p. 70 – via British Newspaper Archive.; "Football Results & Fixtures Service: Results: Saturday: Winstonlead Kent League: Division Two: Division Two Cup". Dover Express. 11 November 1993. p. 71 – via British Newspaper Archive.; "Football Results & Fixtures Service: Results: Saturday: Winstonlead Kent League: Division Two: Division Two Cup". Dover Express. 18 November 1993. p. 71 – via British Newspaper Archive.; "Football Results & Fixtures Service: Results: Saturday: Winstonlead Kent League: Division Two: Division Two Cup". Dover Express. 25 November 1993. p. 63 – via British Newspaper Archive.; "Football Results & Fixtures Service: Results: Saturday: Winstonlead Kent League: Division Two: Division Two Cup". Dover Express. 2 December 1993. p. 54 – via British Newspaper Archive.; "Football Results & Fixtures Service: Results: Saturday: Winstonlead Kent League: Division Two: Division Two Cup". Dover Express. 9 December 1993. p. 59 – via British Newspaper Archive.; "Football Results & Fixtures Service: Results: Saturday: Winstonlead Kent League: Division Two: Division Two Cup". Dover Express. 13 January 1994. p. 86 – via British Newspaper Archive.; "Football Results & Fixtures Service: Results: Wednesday: Winstonlead Kent League: Division Two: Division Two Cup". Dover Express. 10 February 1994. p. 91 – via British Newspaper Archive.
Legend: Blue = home team win; Yellow = draw; Red = away team win.
