= 1997–98 Kent Football League =

The 1997–98 Kent Football League season (known as the Winstonlead Kent League for sponsorship reasons) was the 32nd in the history of the Kent Football League, a football competition in England.

The League structure comprised two divisions: Division One and Division Two with the latter known as the Reserves Section (reserves teams were not permitted in Division One). Additionally there were two league cup competitions: the Challenge Cup for the Division One clubs and another for the teams in the Division Two.

Following this season the two divisions, Division One and Two were renamed the Premier Division and Division One respectively..

== Division One ==
Kent Football League Division One
- Season: 1997–98
- Champions: Herne Bay
- Promoted: Folkestone Invicta
- Matches: 462
- Goals: 1,587 (3.44 per match)

The league featured 22 clubs, 21 of which competed in the previous season together with one additional club:

- VCD Athletic, joined from the Kent County League – the first club promoted to the Kent League via the football pyramid system.

Also, Furness changed their name to Swanley Furness, and Woolwich Town changed their name to Erith Town.

The division was won by Herne Bay for the second season in succession, and for the fourth time during the 1990s. Runners-up Folkestone Invicta took promotion to the Southern League.

Corinthian finished bottom of the table for the second season running, and resigned at the end of the season after seven years in the Kent Football League. The club withdrew from senior football for several years in order to concentrate on its youth teams.

Swanley Furness also resigned from the league despite finishing fourth in the table, dropping down to Division Two due to the club's lack of floodlights which were a requirement from the following season.

=== League table ===
Pos	Team	Pld	W	D	L	GF	GA	GD	Pts	Season End Notes
1	Herne Bay	42	34	5	3	105	29	+76	107	
2	Folkestone Invicta	42	31	4	7	127	42	+85	97	Promoted to the Southern League Southern Division
3	Sheppey United	42	27	10	5	110	63	+47	91	
4	Swanley Furness	42	22	9	11	86	50	+36	75	Resigned to Division Two
5	Greenwich Borough	42	21	11	10	83	42	+41	74	
6	Cray Wanderers	42	20	11	11	70	50	+20	71	
7	Beckenham Town	42	21	7	14	67	54	+13	70	
8	Whitstable Town	42	19	11	12	72	54	+18	68	
9	VCD Athletic	42	17	14	11	88	62	+26	65	
10	Lordswood	42	18	9	15	70	64	+6	63	
11	Tunbridge Wells	42	17	6	19	73	76	−3	57	
12	Thamesmead Town	42	15	9	18	69	70	−1	54	
13	Ramsgate	42	14	9	19	80	85	−5	51	
14	Hythe United	42	15	5	22	75	103	−28	50	
15	Faversham Town	42	14	12	16	62	68	−6	49 (Note: Faversham Town were deducted five points.)	
16	Slade Green	42	12	13	17	58	67	−9	49	
17	Deal Town	42	15	4	23	76	97	−21	49	
18	Chatham Town	42	12	12	18	56	66	−10	48	
19	Erith Town	42	12	6	24	48	86	−38	42	
20	Canterbury City	42	8	6	28	45	96	−51	30	
21	Crockenhill	42	6	2	34	31	133	−102	20	
22	Corinthian	42	2	5	35	36	130	−94	11	Resigned from the league

Source: FCHD
Rules for classification: 1) points; 2) goal difference; 3) number of goals scored.

=== Challenge Cup ===
The 1997–98 Kent Football League Challenge Cup was won by Greenwich Borough.

The competition was contested by the 22 teams from the Division One over five rounds: the first three were a single match knock-out followed by the semis-finals on an aggregate basis (home and away matches) and the final match played on a neutral ground (at Folkestone Invicta F.C. this season).

==== Quarter-finals, Semi-finals and Final ====
Quarter-finals
Herne Bay	5
Erith Town	2
Tunbridge Wells	3 (Note: After extra time, score at 90 minutes 3–3)
Sheppey United	7
Greenwich Borough	2
VCD Athletic	1
Cray Wanderers	1
Swanley Furness	0

Semi-finals
Herne Bay	5	1	6
Sheppey United	0	1	1
Greenwich Borough	6	1	7
Cray Wanderers	0	1	1

Final
Herne Bay	0
Greenwich Borough	1

Sources:

- Quarter-finals: "Weekend Results: Winstonlead Kent League: Division 1 Cup Quarter-Finals". Kent Today. 2 February 1998. p. 35 – via British Newspaper Archive.
- Semi-finals: "Weekend Results: Kent League, Division 1 Cup Semi-Final 1st Leg". Kent Today. 23 March 1998. p. 35 – via British Newspaper Archive.; "Weekend Results: Winstonlead Division 1 Cup Semi-Final 2nd Leg". Kent Today. 30 March 1998. p. 35 – via British Newspaper Archive.
- Final: "Weekend Round-up: Winstonlead Kent League: Division 1 Cup final". Kent Today. 5 May 1998. p. 32 – via British Newspaper Archive.

==== Second Round ====
- Herne Bay 3 – 0 Ramsgate
- Erith Town 3 – 1 Corinthian
- Thamesmead Town 1 – 2 (aet) Tunbridge Wells (Score at 90 minutes: 1–1)
- Lordswood 1 – 2 Sheppey United
- Hythe United 3 – 5 (aet) Greenwich Borough (score at 90 minutes: 2–2)
- Chatham Town 0 – 1 VCD Athletic (played at VCD Athletic F.C.))
- Cray Wanderers 5 – 0 Slade Green
- Swanley Furness 1 – 0 Whitstable Town

==== First Round ====
- Deal Town 1 – 2 Erith Town
- Thamesmead Town 2 – 1 (aet) Canterbury City (score at 90 minutes: 1–1)
- Faversham Town 0 – 3 Tunbridge Wells
- Beckenham Town 1 – 3 Lordswood
- Sheppey United 4 – 1 Crockenhill
- Swanley Furness 3 – 2 Folkestone Invicta
- Byes for the other 10 teams

Sources:

- Second Round: "Weekend Results: Winstonlead Kent League: Division 1 Cup, second round". Kent Today. 10 November 1997. p. 35 – via British Newspaper Archive.; "Weekend Results: Winstonlead Kent League: Division 1 Cup, 2nd round". Kent Today. 17 November 1997. p. 35 – via British Newspaper Archive.
- First Round: "Soccer Details: Last night's results: Winstonlead Kent League: Division 1 Cup, first round". Kent Today. 18 September 1997. p. 47 – via British Newspaper Archive.; "Weekend Results: Winstonlead Kent League: Division 1 Cup, first round". Kent Today. 22 September 1997. p. 39 – via British Newspaper Archive.

== Reserves Section ==
The letter "R" following team names indicates a club’s reserves team.

The 1997–98 Division Two featured reserves teams (which were not permitted in Division One) from Kent and the adjacent area based clubs whose first team played in Division One and other higher ranked leagues. There was a League Cup competition for the teams in the section.

=== Division Two ===
Kent Football League Division Two
- Season: 1997–98
- Champions: Sittingbourne R
- Matches: 342
- Goals: 1,260 (3.68 per match)

The season commenced with the 20 clubs who had competed in the division the previous season, however Faversham Town R withdrew in October and their playing record was expunged.

Prior to the season Furness R changed their name to Swanley Furness R.

The division was won by Sittingbourne R.

At the end of the season two clubs left the division: Tonbridge R resigned from the league and transferred to the Suburban League; and Corinthian R who withdrew from senior football to concentrate on its youth teams.

==== League table ====
Pos	Team	Pld	W	D	L	GF	GA	GD	Pts	Season End Notes
1	Sittingbourne R	36	25	7	4	105	35	+70	82	
2	Tonbridge R	36	24	9	3	93	34	+59	81	Transferred to the Suburban League
3	Thamesmead Town R	36	22	6	8	67	40	+27	72	
4	Swanley Furness R	36	20	5	11	79	45	+34	65	
5	Folkestone Invicta R	36	20	5	11	69	57	+12	65	
6	Dartford R	36	21	7	8	75	49	+26	64 (Note: Dartford R were deducted six points)	
7	Dover Athletic R	36	19	6	11	85	49	+36	63	
8	Lordswood R	36	17	8	11	71	51	+20	59	
9	Herne Bay R	36	17	7	12	75	57	+18	58	
10	Margate R	36	16	7	13	60	59	+1	55	
11	Hastings Town R	36	14	7	15	85	69	+16	49	
12	Chatham Town R	36	10	10	16	47	61	−14	40	
13	Ramsgate R	36	11	4	21	60	94	−34	37	
14	Whitstable Town R	36	10	5	21	59	89	−30	35	
15	Hythe United R	36	11	2	23	62	103	−41	35	
16	Corinthian R	36	9	5	22	47	74	−27	32	Resigned
17	Beckenham Town R	36	7	6	23	40	86	−46	27	
18	Crockenhill R	36	7	5	24	38	98	−60	26	
19	Deal Town R	36	5	3	28	43	110	−67	18	

Source: "Winstonlead Kent League: Final Table 1997-98: Division 2". Kentish Gazette. 21 May 1998. p. 71 – via British Newspaper Archive.
Rules for classification: 1) points; 2) goal difference; 3) number of goals scored.

=== Division Two Cup ===
The 1997–98 Kent Football League Division Two Cup was won by Thamesmead Town R.

The competition was drawn for the initial twenty teams from Division Two (prior to the resignation of Faversham Town R) and comprised five rounds: the first three were a single match knock-out followed by the semis-finals on an aggregate basis (home and away matches) and a single match final on a neutral ground (at Whitstable Town F.C. this season).

==== Quarter-finals, Semi-finals and Final ====
Quarter-finals
Herne Bay R	6
Hythe United R	2
Folkestone Invicta R	1
Dartford R	0
Thamesmead Town R
Swanley Furness R
Lordswood R	1
Sittingbourne R	2

Semi-finals
Herne Bay R	5	1	6
Folkestone Invicta R	1	1	2
Thamesmead Town R	1	1 (Note: After extra time, score at 90 mins: 0–0)	2
Sittingbourne R	1	0	1

Final
Herne Bay R	1 (Note: After extra time, score at 90 mins: 0–0)	4p (Note: Penalty shoot-out)
Thamesmead Town R	1	5p

Sources:

- Quarter-finals: "Kent Winstonlead League: Division 2 Cup, Quarter Final". Kent Today. 26 January 1998. p. 34 – via British Newspaper Archive.; "Soccer Details: Last Night's Results: Winstonlead Kent League: Division 2 Cup, quarter-final". Kent Today. 28 January 1998. p. 39 – via British Newspaper Archive.; "Senior Soccer: Results: Saturday: Winstonlead Kent League: Division 2 Cup, quarter-final". Kentish Gazette. 5 February 1998. p. 66 – via British Newspaper Archive.
- Semi-finals: "Weekend Results: Winstonlead Kent League: Division 2 Cup Semi-Final 1st Leg". Kent Today. 16 March 1998. p. 35 – via British Newspaper Archive.; "Weekend Results: Winstonlead Kent League: Division 2 Cup Semi-Final 2nd Leg". Kent Today. 23 March 1998. p. 35 – via British Newspaper Archive.
- Final: "Cup lost on penalties". Herne Bay Times. 16 April 1998. p. 62 – via British Newspaper Archive.

==== Second Round ====
- Herne Bay R 2 – 1 Dover Athletic R
- Beckenham Town R 2 – 4 Hythe United R
- Ramsgate R 2 – 5 Folkestone Invicta R
- Thamesmead Town R 2 – 0 Crockenhill R
- Swanley Furness R 6 – 3 (aet) Tonbridge R
- Lordswood R 0 – 1 Chatham Town R
- Corinthian R 1 – 4 Sittingbourne R
- Bye for Dartford R owing to resignation of Faversham Town R

==== First Round ====
- Ramsgate R 3 – 0 Whitstable Town R
- Folkestone Invicta R 2 – 1 Hastings Town R
- Lordswood R 2 – 0 (aet) Deal Town R
- Chatham Town R 2 – 2 Margate R (extra time not played)
- REPLAY: Margate R 0 – 1 (aet) Chatham Town R
- Byes for the other 12 teams (the draw originally included Faversham Town R)

Sources:

- Second Round:"Weekend Results: Winstonlead Kent League: Division 2 Cup, second Round". Kent Today. 10 November 1997. p. 35 – via British Newspaper Archive.; "Weekend Results: Winstonlead Kent League: Division 2 Cup, 2nd round". Kent Today. 17 November 1997. p. 35 – via British Newspaper Archive.; "Weekend Results: Winstonlead Kent League: Division 2 Cup". Kent Today. 1 December 1997. p. 35 – via British Newspaper Archive.
- First Round: "Weekend Results: Winstonlead Kent League: Division 2 Cup". Kent Today. 22 September 1997. p. 39 – via British Newspaper Archive.; "Soccer Details: Last Night's Results: Winstonlead Kent League: Division 2 Cup, first round replay". Kent Today. 1 October 1997. p. 35 – via British Newspaper Archive.
