= 1994–95 Kent Football League =

The 1994–95 Kent Football League season (known as the Winstonlead Kent League for sponsorship reasons) was the 29th in the history of the Kent Football League, a football competition in England.

The League structure comprised two divisions: Division One and Division Two with the latter known as the Reserves Section (reserves teams were not permitted in Division One). Additionally there were two league cup competitions: the Challenge Cup for the Division One clubs and another for the teams in Division Two.

== Division One ==
Kent Football League Division One
- Season: 1994–95
- Champions: Sheppey United
- Matches: 420
- Goals: 1,446 (3.44 per match)

The league featured 21 clubs, 20 of which competed in the previous season together with one additional club:

- Canterbury City, joining the Kent League after they resigned from the Southern League

The division was won by Sheppey United, their fourth title and their first since 1979.

At the end of the season, two long-standing clubs left the division: Darenth Heathside who had joined in 1979; and Kent Police who had been Division One members since 1969 dropped to Division Two.

=== League table ===
Pos	Team	Pld	W	D	L	GF	GA	GD	Pts	Season End Notes
1	Sheppey United	40	29	9	2	118	32	+86	96	
2	Chatham Town	40	26	10	4	117	41	+76	88	
3	Furness	40	24	9	7	81	33	+48	81	
4	Folkestone Invicta	40	21	11	8	107	51	+56	74	
5	Ramsgate	40	21	11	8	91	45	+46	74	
6	Thamesmead Town	40	21	10	9	87	52	+35	73	
7	Herne Bay	40	19	13	8	68	35	+33	70	
8	Deal Town	40	18	10	12	87	62	+25	64	
9	Whitstable Town	40	17	11	12	83	61	+22	62	
10	Beckenham Town	40	15	11	14	61	61	0	56	
11	Dartford	40	14	11	15	61	51	+10	53	
12	Corinthian	40	15	8	17	50	63	−13	53	
13	Canterbury City	40	14	6	20	66	80	−14	48	
14	Tunbridge Wells	40	12	11	17	48	66	−18	47	
15	Greenwich Borough	40	13	6	21	71	94	−23	45	
16	Crockenhill	40	10	12	18	45	62	−17	42	
17	Slade Green	40	10	12	18	49	73	−24	42	
18	Faversham Town	40	9	8	23	49	118	−69	35	
19	Cray Wanderers	40	6	14	20	45	76	−31	32	
20	Darenth Heathside	40	3	4	33	32	137	−105	13	Resigned from the league
21	Kent Police	40	4	1	35	30	153	−123	13	Moved to Division Two

Source: FCHD nonleaguematters
Rules for classification: 1) points; 2) goal difference; 3) number of goals scored.

=== Challenge Cup ===
The 1994–95 Kent Football League Challenge Cup was won for the third consecutive season by Ramsgate.

The competition was contested by the 21 teams from Division One over five rounds: the first three were a single match knock-out followed by the semi-finals on an aggregate basis (home and away matches) and the final match played on a neutral ground (at Sittingbourne F.C. this season).

==== Quarter-finals, Semi-finals and Final ====
Quarter-finals
Tunbridge Wells	2
Deal Town	0
Dartford	1
Faversham Town	0
Corinthian	1
Folkestone Invicta	4
Whitstable Town	0
Ramsgate	3

Semi-finals
Tunbridge Wells	1	0 (Note: After extra time)	1
Dartford	1	1	2
Folkestone Invicta	1	0	1
Ramsgate	2	4	6

Final
Dartford	0
Ramsgate	3

Sources:

- Quarter-finals: "Results & Fixtures: Results: Tuesday: Winstonlead Kent League: Cup Quarter-Finals". Dover Express. 2 February 1995. p. 86 – via British Newspaper Archive.; "Results & Fixtures: Results: Tuesday: Winstonlead Kent League: Division One Cup Quarter Final". Dover Express. 9 February 1995. p. 87 – via British Newspaper Archive.; "Results & Fixtures: Results: Thursday: Winstonlead Kent League Cup Quarter Final". Dover Express. 2 March 1995. p. 87 – via British Newspaper Archive.; "Results & Fixtures: Results: Wednesday: Winstonlead Kent League Cup Quarter Final". Dover Express. 9 March 1995. p. 83 – via British Newspaper Archive.
- Semi-finals: "Results & Fixtures: Results: Saturday: Winstonlead Kent League Cup Semi-Finals, First Leg". Dover Express. 9 March 1995. p. 83 – via British Newspaper Archive.; "Results & Fixtures: Results: Saturday: Winstonlead Kent League Cup Semi-Finals, Second Leg". Dover Express. 16 March 1995. p. 83 – via British Newspaper Archive.; "Results & Fixtures: Results: Saturday: Winstonlead Kent League Cup Semi-Finals, Second Leg". Dover Express. 23 March 1995. p. 83 – via British Newspaper Archive.
- Final: "Results & Fixtures: Results: Saturday: Winstonlead Kent League: Division One Cup Final". Dover Express. 27 April 1995. p. 75 – via British Newspaper Archive.

==== Second Round ====
- Tunbridge Wells 4 – 1 Beckenham Town
- Chatham Town 0 – 1 Deal Town
- Greenwich Borough 2 – 6 Dartford
- Canterbury City 1 – 2 Faversham Town
- Corinthian 3 – 1 Crockenhill
- Folkestone Invicta 1 – 0 (aet) Herne Bay
- Whitstable Town 4 – 2 Slade Green
- Ramsgate 2 – 1 Thamesmead Town

==== First Round ====
- Furness 0 – 0 (aet) Beckenham Town
- REPLAY: Beckenham Town 1 – 0 Furness
- Deal Town 5 – 0 Darenth Heathside
- Greenwich Borough 3 – 1 Sheppey United
- Kent Police 0 – 1 Canterbury City
- Cray Wanderers 2 – 5 Thamesmead Town
- Byes for the other 11 teams

Sources:

- Second Round:"Results & Fixtures: Results: Saturday: Winstonlead Kent League: Division One Cup (Round Two)". Dover Express. 10 November 1994. p. 95 – via British Newspaper Archive.; "Results & Fixtures: Results: Saturday: Winstonlead Kent League: Division One: Division One Cup, Second round". Dover Express. 1 December 1994. p. 99 – via British Newspaper Archive."Results & Fixtures: Results: Saturday: Winstonlead Kent League: Division One Cup (Round Two)". Dover Express. 10 November 1994. p. 95 – via British Newspaper Archive.; "Results & Fixtures: Results: Saturday: Winstonlead Kent League: Division One: Division One Cup, Second round". Dover Express. 1 December 1994. p. 99 – via British Newspaper Archive.
- First Round:"Winstonlead Kent League: Division 1 Cup, First Round". Kent Today. 19 September 1994. p. 39 – via British Newspaper Archive.; "Winstonlead Kent League: Division 1 Cup". Kent Today. 26 September 1994. p. 39 – via British Newspaper Archive.

== Reserves Section ==
The letter "R" following team names indicates a club's reserves team.

The 1994–95 Division Two featured reserves teams (which were not permitted in Division One) from clubs from Kent and the adjacent area whose first team played in Division One and other higher ranked leagues. There was a League Cup competition for the teams in the section.

=== Division Two ===
Kent Football League Division Two
- Season: 1994–95
- Champions: Thamesmead Town R
- Matches: 210
- Goals: 776 (3.7 per match)

The division featured 15 clubs, 12 who had competed in the previous season together with three additional clubs:

- Faversham Town R
- Furness R
- Corinthian R

Thamesmead Town R were the division winners and completed a League and Cup double.

==== League table ====
Pos	Team	Pld	W	D	L	GF	GA	GD	Pts
1	Thamesmead Town R	28	19	5	4	74	31	+43	62
2	Dover Athletic R	28	18	5	5	73	44	+29	59
3	Tonbridge AFC R	28	16	4	8	67	40	+27	52
4	Herne Bay R	28	15	2	11	69	47	+22	47
5	Ramsgate R	28	13	8	7	46	39	+7	47
6	Hastings Town R	28	11	9	8	59	42	+17	42
7	Chatham Town R	28	12	5	11	57	54	+3	40 (Note: Chatham Town one point deducted)
8	Furness R	28	11	7	10	40	37	+3	40
9	Folkestone Invicta R	28	11	6	11	60	54	+6	39
10	Beckenham Town R	28	8	8	12	48	56	−8	32
11	Corinthian R	28	8	6	14	37	56	−19	30
12	Whitstable Town R	28	6	9	13	49	56	−7	27
13	Faversham Town R	28	7	5	16	31	61	−30	23 (Note: Faversham Town three points deducted)
14	Deal Town R	28	6	4	18	40	78	−38	22
15	Canterbury City R	28	5	5	18	26	81	−55	20

Source: "League Tables: Winstonlead Kent League: Division Two". Dover Express. 11 May 1995. p. 71 – via British Newspaper Archive.
Rules for classification: 1) points; 2) goal difference; 3) number of goals scored.

=== Division Two Cup ===
The 1994–95 Kent Football League Division Two Cup was won by Thamesmead Town R who completed a Division Two League and Cup double.

The competition for the 15 teams from Division Two comprised four rounds: the first two were a single match knock-out followed by the semi-finals on an aggregate basis (home and away matches) and a single match final on a neutral ground (at Darenth Heathside F.C. this season).

==== Quarter-finals, Semi-finals and Final ====
Quarter-finals
Chatham Town R	1
Folkestone Invicta R	0
Herne Bay R	1
Tonbridge AFC R	3
Beckenham Town R	0
Dover Athletic R	3
Thamesmead Town R	3
Hastings Town R	0

Semi-finals
Chatham Town R	2	2	4
Tonbridge AFC R	0	0	0
Dover Athletic R	0	1	1
Thamesmead Town R	2	1	3

Final
Chatham Town R	2
Thamesmead Town R	4

Sources:

- Quarter-finals: "Results & Fixtures: Results: Saturday: Winstonlead Kent League: Division Two Cup Second Round". Dover Express. 23 February 1995. p. 87 – via British Newspaper Archive.; "Results & Fixtures: Results: Saturday: Winstonlead Kent League: Division Two Cup Second Round". Dover Express. 9 March 1995. p. 83 – via British Newspaper Archive.; "Results & Fixtures: Results: Saturday: Winstonlead Kent League: Division Two: Division Two Cup, Second Round". Dover Express. 23 March 1995. p. 83 – via British Newspaper Archive.
- Semi-finals: "Results & Fixtures: Results: Wednesday: Winstonlead Kent League: Division Two Cup Semi-Final, First Leg". Dover Express. 6 April 1995. p. 79 – via British Newspaper Archive.; "Last night's results: Winstonlead Kent League: Division 2 Cup, semi-final, second leg". Kent Today. 11 April 1995. p. 38 – via British Newspaper Archive.; "Winstonlead Kent League: Division 2 Cup". Kent Today. 18 April 1995. p. 37 – via British Newspaper Archive.
- Final: "Results & Fixtures: Results: Saturday: Winstonlead Kent League: Division One: Division Two Cup Final". Dover Express. 11 May 1995. p. 71 – via British Newspaper Archive.

==== First Round ====
- Beckenham Town R 2 – 1 Ramsgate R
- Deal Town R 1 – 7 Dover Athletic R
- Hastings Town R 2 – 0 Furness R
- Herne Bay R 5 – 1 Faversham Town R
- Thamesmead Town R 4 – 0 Canterbury City R
- Whitstable Town R 2 – 4 Chatham Town R
- Tonbridge AFC R 2 – 1 Corinthian R
- Bye for Folkestone Invicta R

Sources: "Results & Fixtures: Results: Saturday: Winstonlead Kent League: Division Two Cup First Round". Dover Express. 1 December 1994. p. 99 – via British Newspaper Archive.; "Results & Fixtures: Results: Saturday: Winstonlead Kent League: Division Two: Division Two Cup, First Round". Dover Express. 22 December 1994. p. 51 – via British Newspaper Archive.; "Results & Fixtures: Results: Saturday: Winstonlead Kent League: Division Two Cup: First Round". Dover Express. 9 March 1995. p. 83 – via British Newspaper Archive.
