= 2007–08 Kent Football League =

The 2007–08 Kent Football League season was the 42nd in the history of Kent Football League a football competition in England.

The League structure comprised three divisions: a Premier Division together with Divisions One and Two – the latter two were known as the Reserves Section, comprising reserves teams which were not permitted in the Premier Division. Additionally there were two league cup competitions, the Challenge Cup for the Premier Division clubs and another for the teams in the two divisions of the Reserves Section.

== Premier Division ==
Kent Football League Premier Division
- Season: 2007–08
- Champions: Thamesmead Town
- Promoted: Thamesmead Town
- Matches: 272
- Goals: 959 (3.53 per match)

The division featured 17 clubs, 16 of which competed in the previous season together with one additional club:

- Holmesdale, joined from the Kent County League

At the end of the season Thamesmead Town were promoted to the Isthmian League Division One North.

=== League table ===
Pos	Team	Pld	W	D	L	GF	GA	GD	Pts	Promotion
1	Thamesmead Town	32	24	6	2	87	36	+51	78	Promoted to the Isthmian League Division One North
2	VCD Athletic	32	22	5	5	73	33	+40	71	
3	Beckenham Town	32	21	7	4	80	41	+39	70	
4	Hythe Town	32	20	5	7	85	35	+50	65	
5	Erith Town	32	13	12	7	61	35	+26	51	
6	Herne Bay	32	14	8	10	60	46	+14	50	
7	Erith & Belvedere	32	13	10	9	68	49	+19	49	
8	Greenwich Borough	32	12	10	10	44	36	+8	46	
9	Deal Town	32	12	5	15	62	66	−4	41	
10	Tunbridge Wells	32	12	5	15	53	60	−7	41	
11	Sevenoaks Town	32	9	6	17	57	64	−7	33	
12	Croydon	32	9	5	18	38	61	−23	32	
13	Faversham Town	32	9	4	19	43	79	−36	31	
14	Slade Green	32	8	6	18	38	75	−37	30	
15	Holmesdale	32	6	10	16	40	59	−19	28	
16	Lordswood	32	7	6	19	39	69	−30	27	
17	Sporting Bengal United	32	4	4	24	31	115	−84	16	

Source: FCHD
Rules for classification: 1) points; 2) goal difference; 3) number of goals scored.

=== Results ===
Home \ Away	BEC	CRO	DEA	E&B	ERI	FAV	GRE	HER	HOL	HYT	LOR	SEV	SLA	SPB	THA	TUN	VCD
Beckenham Town		4–0	4–1	2–1	4–1	3–1	2–1	2–1	2–1	6–3	1–1	2–0	2–1	5–2	2–6	3–0	1–3
Croydon	1–2		1–0	1–1	1–2	3–4	0–3	0–7	0–0	0–2	0–2	1–0	3–0	1–0	0–1	6–0	0–3
Deal Town	0–0	0–1		1–4	1–1	3–1	1–2	3–2	1–1	2–1	5–1	5–1	2–3	3–2	5–5	4–0	1–2
Erith & Belvedere	0–5	1–3	1–3		0–0	1–2	1–1	0–0	1–0	4–1	1–1	3–2	6–1	4–0	4–2	8–1	0–3
Erith Town	2–2	4–2	2–0	1–1		1–1	2–0	2–4	1–2	2–3	3–0	1–1	0–1	5–0	1–1	2–0	1–1
Faversham Town	1–5	1–4	2–3	1–1	0–5		2–2	0–6	2–0	1–3	0–3	0–1	1–2	2–0	1–2	3–1	1–2
Greenwich Borough	1–1	2–2	2–0	1–0	1–1	0–2		1–0	0–3	1–1	1–0	0–2	1–0	5–1	1–2	1–0	1–2
Herne Bay	1–0	1–0	4–3	2–2	0–1	4–1	0–3		2–0	0–3	2–1	1–1	0–2	3–1	0–0	0–3	3–1
Holmesdale	3–3	0–0	0–2	2–4	0–2	4–0	1–1	1–3		1–2	1–1	4–2	1–1	2–4	1–2	1–5	1–4
Hythe Town	1–2	2–0	3–0	8–1	2–1	5–0	0–0	1–1	4–0		3–0	2–0	7–1	5–0	1–1	2–1	3–0
Lordswood	0–0	4–2	4–1	2–3	0–1	1–2	1–3	1–2	2–0	1–4		1–4	1–1	6–0	1–6	3–2	0–4
Sevenoaks Town	1–2	2–2	2–4	1–0	2–2	0–5	2–2	0–0	1–3	2–4	6–0		3–4	5–1	1–2	0–1	0–3
Slade Green	1–5	0–2	3–3	0–5	0–2	1–2	1–1	3–3	0–1	1–0	2–1	1–3		1–1	1–5	1–2	0–2
Sporting Bengal United	2–4	3–2	2–3	0–4	0–8	1–1	2–1	0–2	2–2	1–7	0–0	1–7	0–3		1–7	0–3	0–4
Thamesmead Town	1–0	2–0	3–0	2–2	2–1	2–1	1–0	4–2	2–1	1–1	4–0	2–4	5–0	5–1		2–0	4–2
Tunbridge Wells	1–1	7–0	3–1	0–4	2–2	5–2	1–5	2–2	2–2	2–0	4–0	2–0	2–0	0–1	0–1		1–1
VCD Athletic	2–3	1–0	3–1	0–0	1–1	5–0	2–0	4–2	1–1	2–1	1–0	3–1	3–2	5–2	1–2	2–0	

Source: Kent League (archived)
Legend: Blue = home team win; Yellow = draw; Red = away team win.

=== Challenge Cup ===
The 2007–08 Kent Football League Challenge Cup was won by Erith Town.

The competition was played by the 17 teams form the Premier Division One initially organised into four groups. The group winners and runners-up progressed into the quarter-finals, decided on a single match knockout basis with the group winners drawn at home. The semi-finals were decided on an aggregate basis (home and away matches), followed by a final match played on a neutral ground (at Folkestone Invicta F.C. this season).

==== Quarter-finals, Semi-finals and Final ====
Quarter-finals
Erith & Belvedere	1
Beckenham Town	2
VCD Athletic	1
Erith Town	2
Hythe Town	5
Thamesmead Town	0
Croydon	1
Herne Bay	2

Semi-finals
Beckenham Town	0	1	1
Erith Town	0	2	2
Hythe Town	4	2	6
Herne Bay	1	0	1

Final
Erith Town	1
Hythe Town	0

Kent League (archived)

==== Group Stage ====
- Group A

Pos	Team	Pld	W	D	L	GF	GA	GD	Pts	
1	VCD Athletic	8	4	2	2	12	8	+4	14	Progressed to Quarter-final (home)
2	Herne Bay	8	3	4	1	11	9	+2	13	Progressed to Quarter-final (away)
3	Greenwich Borough	8	2	5	1	10	7	+3	11	
4	Sevenoaks Town	8	3	2	3	8	9	−1	11	
5	Tunbridge Wells	8	1	1	6	9	17	−8	4	

Source: Kent League (archived)
Rules for classification: 1) points; 2) goal difference; 3) number of goals scored.

Home \ Away	GRE	HER	SEV	TUN	VCD
Greenwich Borough		1–1	2–0	2–2	1–1
Herne Bay	1–1		2–2	1–0	3–1
Sevenoaks Town	1–0	1–1		1–3	2–0
Tunbridge Wells	1–3	1–2	0–1		1–4
VCD Athletic	0–0	2–0	1–0	3–1	

Source: Kent League (archived)
Legend: Blue = home team win; Yellow = draw; Red = away team win.
- Group B

Pos	Team	Pld	W	D	L	GF	GA	GD	Pts	
1	Erith & Belvedere	6	4	2	0	23	7	+16	14	Progressed to Quarter-final (home)
2	Thamesmead Town	6	4	1	1	15	7	+8	13	Progressed to Quarter-final (away)
3	Deal Town	6	2	1	3	11	12	−1	7	
4	Faversham Town	6	0	0	6	5	28	−23	0	

Source: Kent League (archived)
Rules for classification: 1) points; 2) goal difference; 3) number of goals scored.

Home \ Away	DEA	E&B	FAV	THA
Deal Town		1–1	5–0	0–2
Erith & Belvedere	5–2		9–2	2–1
Faversham Town	0–2	0–5		1–2
Thamesmead Town	4–1	1–1	5–2	

Source: Kent League (archived)
Legend: Blue = home team win; Yellow = draw; Red = away team win.
- Group C

Pos	Team	Pld	W	D	L	GF	GA	GD	Pts	
1	Croydon	6	4	1	1	15	6	+9	13	Progressed to Quarter-final (home)
2	Erith Town	6	3	0	3	9	6	+3	9	Progressed to Quarter-final (away)
3	Lordswood	6	2	2	2	5	6	−1	8	
4	Sporting Bengal United	6	1	1	4	6	17	−11	4	

Source: Kent League (archived)
Rules for classification: 1) points; 2) goal difference; 3) number of goals scored.

Home \ Away	CRO	ERI	LOR	SPB
Croydon		2–3	2–0	5–1
Erith Town	0–1		0–1	1–2
Lordswood	1–1	0–1		1–1
Sporting Bengal United	1–4	0–4	1–2	

Source: Kent League (archived)
Legend: Blue = home team win; Yellow = draw; Red = away team win.
- Group D

Pos	Team	Pld	W	D	L	GF	GA	GD	Pts	
1	Hythe Town	6	5	0	1	16	5	+11	15	Progressed to Quarter-final (home)
2	Beckenham Town	6	4	0	2	13	6	+7	12	Progressed to Quarter-final (away)
3	Holmesdale	6	2	0	4	8	14	−6	6	
4	Slade Green	6	1	0	5	3	15	−12	3	

Source: Kent League (archived)
Rules for classification: 1) points; 2) goal difference; 3) number of goals scored.

Home \ Away	BEC	HOL	HYT	SLA
Beckenham Town		2–1	4–0	0–1
Holmesdale	1–5		0–3	2–0
Hythe Town	3–0	3–0		5–1
Slade Green	0–2	1–4	0–2	

Source: Kent League (archived)
Legend: Blue = home team win; Yellow = draw; Red = away team win.

== Reserves Section ==
The letter "R" following team names indicates a club’s reserves team.

The 2007–08 Reserves Section comprised two divisions, with promotion and relegation possible between the divisions. Promotion from the Reserves Section into the Premier Division was not permitted. There was a single League Cup competition for all teams in the section.

=== Division One ===
Kent Football League Division One
- Season: 2007–08
- Champions: Thamesmead Town R
- Matches: 132
- Goals: 478 (3.62 per match)

The division featured twelve clubs, ten of which competed in the previous season together with Chatham Town R and Margate R who had both been promoted from Division Two.

At the end of the season Ramsgate R were relegated and Erith Town R, who occupied the other relegation position, left the league.

==== League table ====
Pos	Team	Pld	W	D	L	GF	GA	GD	Pts	Season End Notes
1	Thamesmead Town R	22	14	5	3	44	23	+21	47	
2	Dartford R	22	12	4	6	42	28	+14	40	
3	Chatham Town R	22	13	1	8	48	38	+10	40	
4	Maidstone United R	22	11	5	6	50	26	+24	38	
5	Sevenoaks Town R	22	10	6	6	40	33	+7	36	
6	Cray Wanderers R	22	10	5	7	33	36	−3	35	
7	Erith & Belvedere R	22	10	3	9	46	48	−2	33	
8	Whitstable Town R	22	8	4	10	44	42	+2	28	
9	Margate R	22	6	6	10	49	56	−7	24	
10	Folkestone Invicta R	22	7	2	13	31	44	−13	23	
11	Ramsgate R	22	4	4	14	29	49	−20	16	Relegated to Division Two
12	Erith Town R	22	2	5	15	22	55	−33	11	Resigned from the League

Source: Kent League (archived)
Rules for classification: 1) points; 2) goal difference; 3) number of goals scored.

==== Results ====
Home \ Away	CHA	CRA	DAR	E&B	ERI	FOL	MAI	MAR	RAM	SEV	THA	WHI
Chatham Town R		0–1	1–0	1–2	3–3	1–2	1–4	2–1	3–1	4–1	0–1	4–1
Cray Wanderers R	2–0		1–1	1–3	3–0	2–0	2–2	1–1	3–1	2–0	1–1	2–5
Dartford R	0–4	4–0		3–4	3–2	1–0	1–0	4–4	2–0	2–1	1–1	1–2
Erith & Belvedere R	3–4	1–2	0–3		3–2	3–1	0–7	4–2	5–1	1–2	2–3	0–0
Erith Town R	1–5	0–2	0–3	2–2		2–3	1–0	4–5	1–1	0–5	0–2	1–1
Folkestone Invicta R	1–2	1–3	0–2	1–3	5–1		0–4	1–1	0–4	2–2	3–1	3–4
Maidstone United R	5–0	2–0	2–3	2–1	0–0	1–2		3–1	3–1	1–1	1–2	3–2
Margate R	0–3	5–2	1–1	1–1	2–1	3–2	1–3		4–5	1–2	1–3	0–2
Ramsgate R	1–5	1–1	1–2	2–4	0–1	0–1	2–2	1–2		1–2	2–1	2–1
Sevenoaks Town R	1–2	1–2	2–1	0–1	2–0	2–1	3–2	4–3	2–2		1–1	2–0
Thamesmead Town R	5–0	1–0	2–1	4–1	1–0	1–0	2–3	3–3	2–0	2–2		2–0
Whitstable Town R	2–3	6–0	0–3	4–2	4–0	1–2	0–0	4–7	2–0	2–2	1–3	

Source: Kent League (archived)
Legend: Blue = home team win; Yellow = draw; Red = away team win.

=== Division Two ===
Kent Football League Division Two
- Season: 2007–08
- Champions: Dover Athletic R
- Matches: 156
- Goals: 548 (3.51 per match)

The division featured thirteen clubs, ten of which competed in the previous season together with three additional clubs:

- Ashford Town (Kent) R, relegated from Division One
- Holmesdale R
- Croydon R

At the end of the season Dover Athletic R and Ashford Town (Kent) R were promoted to Division One and Croydon R, after one season, and Sittingbourne R left the League.

==== League table ====
Pos	Team	Pld	W	D	L	GF	GA	GD	Pts	Season End Notes
1	Dover Athletic R	24	18	3	3	67	28	+39	57	Promoted to Division One
2	Ashford Town (Kent) R	24	14	5	5	68	36	+32	47	Promoted to Division One
3	Greenwich Borough R	24	14	5	5	56	30	+26	47	
4	VCD Athletic R	24	13	6	5	59	30	+29	45	
5	Deal Town R	24	13	4	7	43	29	+14	43	
6	Tunbridge Wells R	24	14	0	10	58	39	+19	42	
7	Holmesdale R	24	13	3	8	37	30	+7	42	
8	Faversham Town R	24	10	2	12	31	49	−18	32	
9	Hythe Town R	24	9	4	11	33	46	−13	31	
10	Sittingbourne R	24	5	4	15	31	55	−24	19	Resigned from the League
11	Lordswood R	24	5	4	15	25	61	−36	19	
12	Herne Bay R	24	4	4	16	21	49	−28	16	
13	Croydon R	24	1	2	21	19	66	−47	5	Resigned from the League

Source: Kent League (archived)
Rules for classification: 1) points; 2) goal difference; 3) number of goals scored.

==== Results ====
Home \ Away	ASH	CRO	DEA	DOV	FAV	GRE	HER	HOL	HYT	LOR	SIT	TUN	VCD
Ashford Town (Kent) R		3–2	3–0	1–1	7–1	5–3	3–0	3–1	2–3	7–0	2–1	1–2	1–3
Croydon R	1–2		1–3	1–2	1–3	0–1	0–0	1–1	2–3	0–1	0–3	0–4	0–3
Deal Town R	2–1	1–0		3–2	0–0	2–2	3–0	2–0	6–1	3–0	3–1	0–3	1–1
Dover Athletic R	2–1	5–1	1–2		1–0	5–3	5–2	4–0	6–0	2–1	4–0	3–2	2–0
Faversham Town R	3–5	2–1	3–1	1–5		1–3	2–0	0–2	1–0	2–0	2–1	1–4	1–3
Greenwich Borough R	2–2	4–0	2–1	0–2	4–0		4–1	2–1	0–1	1–1	0–1	6–2	2–0
Herne Bay R	1–1	3–0	0–0	3–4	1–2	0–1		0–1	1–0	1–1	1–0	1–3	0–1
Holmesdae R	0–1	3–1	0–3	1–0	2–0	1–3	3–2		2–0	4–0	3–2	2–1	1–0
Hythe Town R	1–5	3–1	1–0	1–3	3–1	1–1	4–0	0–0		5–2	0–3	1–3	1–1
Lordswood R	0–4	1–3	1–0	0–1	0–1	2–7	2–1	1–1	0–2		2–1	4–1	2–2
Sittingbourne R	2–2	4–3	0–3	2–2	1–1	0–3	0–1	1–6	0–0	4–1		0–1	2–6
Tunbridge Wells R	4–5	3–0	1–2	1–3	1–2	0–1	5–0	3–0	2–1	3–1	7–1		2–1
VCD Athletic R	1–1	8–0	5–2	2–2	3–1	1–1	4–2	0–2	4–1	5–2	2–1	3–0	

Source: Kent League (archived)
Legend: Blue = home team win; Yellow = draw; Red = away team win.

=== Reserves Cup ===
The 2007–08 Kent Football League Reserves Cup was won by Ashford Town (Kent) R.

The competition was contested by all 25 teams of the Reserves Section over a total of five rounds: the first three were single match knock-out rounds, followed by the semi-finals on an aggregate basis (home and away matches) and then the final match played on a neutral ground (at Whitstable Town F.C. this season)

==== Quarter-finals, Semi-finals and Final ====
Quarter-finals
Margate R	2
Holmesdale R	1
Maidstone United R	2
Dartford R	3
Cray Wanderers R	1
Ashford Town (Kent) R	2
Deal Town R	3
Hythe Town R	0

Semi-finals
Margate R	0	2	2
Dartford R	1	3	4
Ashford Town (Kent) R	2	3	5
Deal Town R	0	1	1

Final
Dartford R	1
Ashford Town (Kent) R	2

==== Second Round ====
- Margate R 4 – 1 Croydon R
- Chatham Town R 1 – 2 Holmesdale R
- Maidstone United R 4 – 3 Greenwich Borough R
- Whitstable Town R 1 – 3 Dartford R
- Herne Bay R 1 – 4 Cray Wanderers R
- Ashford Town (Kent) R 4 – 1 Sittingbourne R
- Ramsgate R 1 – 1 Deal Town R (Deal Town R won 4-3 on penalties)
- Hythe Town R 2 – 1 Dover Athletic R

==== First Round ====
- VCD Athletic R 0 – 4 Margate R
- Chatham Town R 2 – 0 Faversham Town R
- Folkestone Invicta R 0 – 4 Holmesdale R
- Sevenoaks Town R 1 – 4 Maidstone United R
- Lordswood R 0 – 1 Whitstable Town R
- Dartford R 3 – 1 Erith Town R
- Herne Bay R 2 – 1 Tunbridge Wells R
- Ashford Town (Kent) R 6 – 1 Thamesmead Town R
- Erith & Belvedere R 2 – 3 Ramsgate R

Byes for the remaining seven teams

Source: Kent League (archived) & Kent League (archived)
