= 2006–07 Kent Football League =

The 2006–07 Kent Football League season was the 41st in the history of Kent Football League a football competition in England.

The League structure comprised three divisions: a Premier Division together with Divisions One and Two – the latter two were known as the Reserves Section, comprising reserves teams which were not permitted in the Premier Division. Additionally there were two league cup competitions, the Challenge Cup for the Premier Division clubs and another for the teams in the two divisions of the Reserves Section.

== Premier Division ==
Kent Football League Premier Division
- Season: 2006–07
- Champions: Whitstable Town
- Promoted: Whitstable Town
- Matches: 272
- Goals: 925 (3.4 per match)

The league featured 17 clubs, 15 clubs which had competed in the previous season together with two additional clubs:

- Croydon, transferred from the Isthmian League Division Two
- Faversham Town, joined from the Kent County League, returning to the league after a three year absence

At the end of the season Whitstable Town were promoted to the Isthmian League Division One South.

=== League table ===
Pos	Team	Pld	W	D	L	GF	GA	GD	Pts	Promotion
1	Whitstable Town	32	21	7	4	76	40	+36	70	Promoted to the Isthmian League Division One South
2	VCD Athletic	32	20	7	5	79	38	+41	67	
3	Croydon	32	20	7	5	58	34	+24	67	
4	Thamesmead Town	32	19	6	7	75	44	+31	63	
5	Greenwich Borough	32	19	6	7	63	38	+25	63	
6	Hythe Town	32	16	8	8	59	35	+24	56	
7	Erith & Belvedere	32	16	8	8	68	50	+18	56	
8	Deal Town	32	14	6	12	68	55	+13	48	
9	Herne Bay	32	12	8	12	51	41	+10	44	
10	Sevenoaks Town	32	12	6	14	50	57	−7	42	
11	Beckenham Town	32	12	4	16	64	52	+12	40	
12	Faversham Town	32	10	6	16	36	55	−19	36	
13	Lordswood	32	8	5	19	40	68	−28	29	
14	Erith Town	32	7	3	22	35	60	−25	24	
15	Tunbridge Wells	32	5	8	19	39	66	−27	23	
16	Slade Green	32	5	8	19	36	68	−32	23	
17	Sporting Bengal United	32	2	5	25	28	124	−96	11	

Source: FCHD
Rules for classification: 1) points; 2) goal difference; 3) number of goals scored.

=== Results ===
Home \ Away	BEC	CRO	DEA	E&B	ERI	FAV	GRE	HER	HYT	LOR	SEV	SLA	SPB	THA	TUN	VCD	WHI
Beckenham Town		2–3	2–1	1–2	2–1	1–2	2–1	2–1	3–1	4–1	1–4	4–2	9–0	1–1	1–0	1–2	3–3
Croydon	0–4		2–1	2–0	1–0	5–1	1–2	1–1	0–0	1–0	3–1	3–0	4–0	1–1	3–1	3–1	1–1
Deal Town	1–4	2–4		1–1	6–2	2–2	0–2	0–0	1–1	1–2	3–1	2–1	7–0	1–3	2–2	2–2	4–5
Erith & Belvedere	3–2	2–0	0–1		1–0	2–0	1–1	2–1	2–2	3–4	3–2	4–2	5–0	1–3	2–2	0–3	2–0
Erith Town	1–0	0–1	2–3	2–2		0–1	2–3	1–3	1–2	5–1	0–1	1–0	7–1	0–3	2–1	0–1	0–4
Faversham Town	2–1	0–2	0–1	2–0	0–1		1–6	0–3	0–0	1–0	2–0	2–1	2–3	3–2	0–0	0–3	0–1
Greenwich Borough	1–0	0–2	0–2	3–1	5–0	1–2		1–2	2–0	3–2	3–2	1–1	2–1	2–0	3–2	1–2	2–2
Herne Bay	2–1	1–2	1–2	0–2	1–1	3–2	1–3		3–1	4–0	2–0	0–0	2–1	4–0	1–0	1–1	0–1
Hythe Town	2–1	0–1	4–1	2–2	1–0	3–0	1–1	2–1		1–0	0–1	3–0	7–0	1–1	4–3	2–0	1–1
Lordswood	3–2	0–0	0–2	1–2	3–0	1–1	0–4	3–3	0–4		1–1	2–1	2–0	1–2	2–1	1–3	1–2
Sevenoaks Town	1–0	1–1	2–0	3–4	1–0	2–0	1–1	4–3	1–2	3–1		3–3	3–2	0–1	0–1	0–0	1–3
Slade Green	1–1	0–3	0–1	0–4	2–3	3–1	1–1	1–0	0–4	4–1	2–2		2–0	0–4	0–2	2–2	0–4
Sporting Bengal United	0–0	1–2	0–8	0–5	3–1	0–5	2–3	1–1	0–2	0–3	2–3	1–1		0–2	1–1	0–3	1–5
Thamesmead Town	3–1	5–0	1–3	2–2	1–1	3–1	3–1	4–3	1–0	3–1	3–2	1–2	10–3		2–0	3–1	2–2
Tunbridge Wells	2–6	3–4	1–2	1–3	2–1	2–2	0–1	0–0	1–2	3–2	0–3	2–1	3–3	0–3		1–1	1–3
VCD Athletic	3–2	2–2	3–1	3–3	3–0	2–0	1–2	0–2	4–3	3–0	6–0	4–2	8–1	4–2	2–0		4–0
Whitstable Town	2–0	1–0	5–4	4–2	1–0	1–1	0–1	2–1	3–1	1–1	4–1	2–1	6–1	2–0	4–1	1–2	

Source: Kent League (archived)
Legend: Blue = home team win; Yellow = draw; Red = away team win.

=== Challenge Cup ===
The 2006–07 Kent Football League Challenge Cup was won by Thamesmead Town.

The competition was played by the 17 teams form the Premier Division One initially organised into four groups. The group winners and runners-up progressed into the quarter-finals, decided on a single match knockout basis with the group winners drawn at home. The semi-finals were decided on an aggregate basis (home and away matches), followed by a final match played on a neutral ground (at Folkestone Invicta F.C. this season).

==== Quarter-finals, Semi-finals and Final ====
Quarter-finals
Herne Bay	3
Croydon	2
Erith & Belvedere	2
Thamesmead Town	5
Beckenham Town	1
Hythe Town	2
Whitstable Town	3
Faversham Town	0

Semi-finals
Herne Bay	0	2	2
Thamesmead Town	3	0	3
Hythe Town	1	2	3
Whitstable Town	2	2	4

Final
Thamesmead Town	3
Whitstable Town	0

Kent League (archived)

==== Group Stage ====
- Group A

Pos	Team	Pld	W	D	L	GF	GA	GD	Pts	
1	Herne Bay	8	5	2	1	18	9	+9	17	Progressed to Quarter-final (home)
2	Hythe Town	8	5	1	2	14	7	+7	16	Progressed to Quarter-final (away)
3	VCD Athletic	8	4	2	2	15	11	+4	14	
4	Slade Green	8	1	2	5	3	12	−9	5	
5	Lordswood	8	1	1	6	7	18	−11	4	

Source: Kent League (archived)
Rules for classification: 1) points; 2) goal difference; 3) number of goals scored.

Home \ Away	HER	HYT	LOR	SLA	VCD
Herne Bay		1–1	5–0	3–0	3–1
Hythe Town	1–3		3–0	2–0	0–2
Lordswood	4–0	0–3		0–1	1–2
Slade Green	0–1	0–1	1–1		0–0
VCD Athletic	2–2	1–3	3–1	4–1	

Source: Kent League (archived)
Legend: Blue = home team win; Yellow = draw; Red = away team win.
- Group B

Pos	Team	Pld	W	D	L	GF	GA	GD	Pts	
1	Erith & Belvedere	6	3	2	1	9	5	+4	11	Progressed to Quarter-final (home)
2	Faversham Town	6	3	1	2	9	8	+1	10	Progressed to Quarter-final (away)
3	Deal Town	6	2	2	2	12	9	+3	8	
4	Sevenoaks Town	6	1	1	4	2	10	−8	4	

Source: Kent League (archived)
Rules for classification: 1) points; 2) goal difference; 3) number of goals scored.

Home \ Away	DEA	E&B	FAV	SEV
Deal Town		2–2	2–3	4–0
Erith & Belvedere	2–2		2–0	1–0
Faversham Town	2–1	0–2		1–1
Sevenoaks Town	0–1	1–0	0–3	

Source: Kent League (archived)
Legend: Blue = home team win; Yellow = draw; Red = away team win.
- Group C

Pos	Team	Pld	W	D	L	GF	GA	GD	Pts	
1	Whitstable Town	6	2	4	0	16	8	+8	10	Progressed to Quarter-final (home)
2	Croydon	6	2	3	1	12	8	+4	9	Progressed to Quarter-final (away)
3	Greenwich Borough	6	2	3	1	10	9	+1	9	
4	Sporting Bengal United	6	1	0	5	4	17	−13	3	

Source: Kent League (archived)
Rules for classification: 1) points; 2) goal difference; 3) number of goals scored.

Home \ Away	CRO	GRE	SPB	WHI
Croydon		3–0	3–0	2–2
Greenwich Borough	2–2		1–0	1–1
Sporting Bengal United	3–1	0–3		0–7
Whitstable Town	1–1	3–3	2–1	

Source: Kent League (archived)
Legend: Blue = home team win; Yellow = draw; Red = away team win.
- Group D

Pos	Team	Pld	W	D	L	GF	GA	GD	Pts	
1	Beckenham Town	6	4	2	0	17	7	+10	14	Progressed to Quarter-final (home)
2	Thamesmead Town	6	3	1	2	17	14	+3	10	Progressed to Quarter-final (away)
3	Tunbridge Wells	6	2	0	4	6	12	−6	6	
4	Erith Town	6	1	1	4	6	13	−7	4	

Source: Kent League (archived)
Rules for classification: 1) points; 2) goal difference; 3) number of goals scored.

Home \ Away	BEC	ERI	THA	TUN
Beckenham Town		1–1	5–1	2–1
Erith Town	0–3		2–1	1–2
Thamesmead Town	4–4	4–2		2–0
Tunbridge Wells	0–2	2–0	1–5	

Source: Kent League (archived)
Legend: Blue = home team win; Yellow = draw; Red = away team win.

== Reserves Section ==
The letter "R" following team names indicates a club’s reserves team.

The 2006–07 Reserves Section comprised two divisions, with promotion and relegation possible between the divisions. Promotion from the Reserves Section into the Premier Division was not permitted. There was a single League Cup competition for all teams in the section.

=== Division One ===
Kent Football League Division One
- Season: 2006–07
- Champions: Thamesmead Town R
- Matches: 132
- Goals: 448 (3.39 per match)

The division featured twelve clubs, ten of which competed in the previous season together with Folkestone Invicta R and Sevenoaks Town R who had both been promoted from Division Two.

At the end of the season Ashford Town (Kent) R were relegated and Bromley R left the league.

==== League table ====
Pos	Team	Pld	W	D	L	GF	GA	GD	Pts	Season End Notes
1	Thamesmead Town R	22	16	3	3	55	21	+34	51	
2	Bromley R	22	15	3	4	58	27	+31	48	Resigned from the League
3	Whitstable Town R	22	14	4	4	49	24	+25	46	
4	Maidstone United R	22	11	4	7	45	25	+20	37	
5	Dartford R	22	10	3	9	31	34	−3	33	
6	Erith & Belvedere R	22	10	2	10	37	34	+3	32	
7	Folkestone Invicta R	22	8	5	9	31	28	+3	29	
8	Erith Town R	22	8	1	13	32	42	−10	25	
9	Ramsgate R	22	7	4	11	31	45	−14	25	
10	Cray Wanderers R	22	6	5	11	38	57	−19	22 (Note: Cray Wanderers R deducted one point.)	
11	Sevenoaks Town R	22	4	7	11	27	33	−6	19	
12	Ashford Town (Kent) R	22	1	3	18	14	78	−64	6	Relegated to Division Two

Source: Kent League (archived)
Rules for classification: 1) points; 2) goal difference; 3) number of goals scored.

==== Results ====
Home \ Away	ASH	BRO	CRA	DAR	E&B	ERI	FOL	MAI	RAM	SEV	THA	WHI
Ashford Town (Kent) R		0–7	0–3	0–3	0–3	3–4	1–2	0–3	1–4	0–0	1–1	0–4
Bromley R	3–0		1–1	6–0	6–1	3–0	2–0	0–3	– (Note: Bromley R v Ramsgate R, Match awarded to Bromley R (0–0))	4–2	3–1	3–3
Cray Wanderers R	5–1	2–1		2–2	2–2	2–6	0–1	0–3	4–0	0–3	4–7	1–1
Dartford R	5–0	1–2	4–0		0–2	2–0	0–1	2–1	2–2	1–0	0–3	1–0
Erith & Belvedere R	2–1	2–3	7–2	2–3		2–1	0–1	0–2	6–1	1–0	1–2	0–2
Erith Town R	1–1	1–2	3–1	0–1	0–1		1–0	1–3	0–1	2–0	1–4	2–3
Folkestone Invicta R	4–0	2–2	5–1	1–1	0–2	5–1		0–2	3–3	1–1	0–1	0–2
Maidstone United R	9–2	0–1	1–2	1–2	1–0	3–0	3–2		1–1	1–1	2–2	0–4
Ramsgate R	4–1	2–1	0–2	1–0	0–1	1–4	0–1	0–4		1–5	0–2	3–1
Sevenoaks Town R	0–1	2–3	2–1	1–0	1–1	1–2	1–1	1–1	2–5		1–1	2–3
Thamesmead Town R	9–1	2–1	5–1	2–1	3–1	3–0	2–0	1–0	3–1	1–0		0–1
Whitstable Town R	2–0	2–4	2–2	7–0	3–0	0–2	2–1	3–1	1–1	2–1	1–0	

Source: Kent League (archived)
Legend: Blue = home team win; Yellow = draw; Red = away team win.

=== Division Two ===
Kent Football League Division Two
- Season: 2006–07
- Champions: Chatham Town R
- Matches: 156
- Goals: 609 (3.9 per match)

The division featured thirteen clubs, eight of which competed in the previous season together with five additional clubs:

- Herne Bay R, relegated from Division One
- Deal Town R, relegated from Division One
- Margate R rejoining the league after an absence of three years.
- Dover Athletic R rejoining the league after an absence of two years.
- Faversham Town R

At the end of the season Chatham Town R and Margate R were promoted to Division One and Tilbury R left the League.

==== League table ====
Pos	Team	Pld	W	D	L	GF	GA	GD	Pts	Season End Notes
1	Chatham Town R	24	17	6	1	61	24	+37	57	Promoted to Division One
2	Margate R	24	15	4	5	54	29	+25	49	Promoted to Division One
3	VCD Athletic R	24	12	5	7	46	36	+10	41	
4	Dover Athletic R	24	11	6	7	55	36	+19	39	
5	Hythe Town R	24	11	2	11	55	48	+7	35	
6	Greenwich Borough R	24	10	5	9	48	42	+6	35	
7	Herne Bay R	24	9	6	9	33	47	−14	33	
8	Faversham Town R	24	8	8	8	50	44	+6	32	
9	Deal Town R	24	9	5	10	36	46	−10	32	
10	Sittingbourne R	24	8	6	10	48	49	−1	30	
11	Lordswood R	24	6	5	13	46	65	−19	23	
12	Tilbury R	24	4	4	16	45	70	−25	16	Resigned from the League
13	Tunbridge Wells R	24	3	4	17	32	73	−41	13	

Source: Kent League (archived)
Rules for classification: 1) points; 2) goal difference; 3) number of goals scored.

==== Results ====
Home \ Away	CHA	DEA	DOV	FAV	GRE	HER	HYT	LOR	MAR	SIT	TIL	TUN	VCD
Chatham Town R		5–1	4–0	3–0	2–0	2–1	3–2	3–0	1–3	1–1	2–1	4–0	3–0
Deal Town R	2–3		3–1	2–1	5–0	3–2	2–0	3–0	1–1	1–3	3–3	0–2	0–3
Dover Athletic R	2–2	3–2		2–2	2–2	5–1	1–1	6–1	2–1	0–1	– (Note: Dover Athletic R v Tilbury R, match awarded to Dover (0–0))	4–0	1–2
Faversham Town R	1–2	6–1	0–2		2–3	4–0	2–0	6–1	1–1	3–3	1–0	4–3	1–1
Greenwich Borough R	2–2	0–2	0–2	0–1		3–2	3–0	1–1	0–1	4–1	4–1	2–1	2–4
Herne Bay R	0–0	0–0	2–0	1–1	0–5		2–1	1–0	2–0	2–2	2–0	2–2	1–1
Hythe Town R	1–4	1–0	3–1	3–3	4–1	6–0		4–3	2–1	4–2	4–1	6–1	1–0
Lordswood R	4–4	1–1	3–3	2–0	2–3	0–5	4–2		1–2	4–1	3–2	5–1	1–3
Margate R	1–1	2–0	0–4	2–2	2–1	8–1	1–0	2–0		3–0	5–1	4–1	4–0
Sittingbourne R	0–1	7–0	0–6	3–0	0–5	2–0	2–3	2–3	2–4		5–0	3–1	4–0
Tilbury R	1–6	2–2	3–3	3–4	2–4	1–2	5–4	3–1	2–3	2–2		5–0	3–4
Tunbridge Wells R	1–2	0–1	1–5	3–2	1–1	1–3	3–2	5–5	0–2	1–1	2–3		1–3
VCD Athletic R	0–1	0–1	2–0	3–3	2–2	0–1	3–1	2–1	4–1	1–1	4–1	4–1	

Source: Kent League (archived)
Legend: Blue = home team win; Yellow = draw; Red = away team win.

=== Reserves Cup ===
The 2006–07 Kent Football League Reserves Cup was won by Thamesmead Town R, who completed a League and Cup double.

The competition was contested by all 25 teams of the Reserves Section over a total of five rounds: the first three were single match knock-out rounds, followed by the semi-finals on an aggregate basis (home and away matches) and then the final match played on a neutral ground (at Lordswood F.C. this season)

==== Quarter-finals, Semi-finals and Final ====
Quarter-finals
Deal Town R	1
Hythe Town R	0
Erith & Belvedere R	1
Cray Wanderers R	0
Sittingbourne R	2
Maidstone United R	1
Dover Athletic R	1
Thamesmead Town R	2

Semi-finals
Deal Town R	3	0	3
Erith & Belvedere R	0	1	1
Sittingbourne R	0	0	0
Thamesmead Town R	2	1	3

Final
Deal Town R	1
Thamesmead Town R	2

==== Second Round ====
- Ramsgate R A – A Deal Town R (Match abandoned, score 1-1)
- Replay: Deal Town R 8 – 2 Ramsgate R
- Hythe Town R 4 – 3 Erith Town R
- Whitstable Town R 2 – 4 Erith & Belvedere R
- Cray Wanderers R 3 – 2 Bromley R
- Sittingbourne R 4 – 1 Faversham Town R
- Margate R 1 – 3 Maidstone United R
- Dover Athletic R 6 – 3 Greenwich Borough R
- Tunbridge Wells R 0 – 8 Thamesmead Town R

==== First Round ====
- Herne Bay R 0 – 1 Erith Town R
- Whitstable Town R 3 – 0 Ashford Town (Kent) R
- Cray Wanderers R 1 – 0 Chatham Town R
- Folkestone Invicta R 1 – 2 Bromley R
- Dartford R 1 – 3 Margate R
- Maidstone United R 1 – 0 Sevenoaks Town R
- Dover Athletic R 3 – 2 Lordswood R
- Greenwich Borough R 4 – 1 Tilbury R
- VCD Athletic R 2 – 3 Thamesmead Town R

Byes for the remaining seven teams

Source: Kent League (archived)
