= Beckenham Town F.C. =

Association football club in England

Coordinates: 51°23′34″N 0°1′44″W

Beckenham Town
- Full name: Beckenham Town Football Club
- Nicknames: The Reds, The Becks
- Founded: 1971
- Ground: Eden Park Avenue, Beckenham
- Capacity: 4,000 (120 seated)
- Chairman: Jason Huntley
- Manager: Mick McDonald (interim)
- League: Southern Counties East League Premier Division
- 2025–26: Isthmian League South East Division, 20th of 22 (relegated)
Home colours	Away colours

Beckenham Town Football Club is a football club based in Beckenham, London, England. It is currently a member of the Southern Counties East League Premier Division, and the team play at Eden Park Avenue.

== History ==
The original Beckenham Town were established in the late 19th century, affiliating to the Kent County Football Association in 1887. In 1923 the club joined Division One of the London League. They won Division One in 1927–28, and were promoted to the Premier Division. However, after finishing second-from-bottom in their first season in the Premier Division, they ended the 1929–30 season in last place, and were relegated back to Division One.

The following season saw them finish second in Division One, earning promotion back to the Premier Division. Despite finishing bottom of the Premier Division in 1931–32 they remained in the division, but after repeating the feat in 1932–33, they were relegated back to Division One. After finishing bottom of Division One in 1934–35 the club left the league. They had also entered a team into the Kent County Amateur League a few seasons before, and continued playing in the Premier Division of the Western Section until rejoining the London League in 1951, where they were placed in the Premier Division.

They remained in the London League's Premier Division until joining the Aetolian League in 1961. This merged with the London League in 1964 to form the Greater London League, with Beckenham placed in Section B. A fifth-place finish in the league's inaugural season saw them win a place in the Premier Division for the 1965–66 season. However, after finishing second-from-bottom of the division that season, they were relegated to Division One. They folded in 1969.

In 1971 the club was reformed based on the Stanhope Rovers junior team. After playing in the South East London Amateur League, they joined Division Two of the new London Spartan League in 1975. After being runners-up in 1977–78, they were promoted to the Premier Division. In 1982 they transferred to Division One of the Kent League, which became the Premier Division in 1998. They finished as runners–up in 2005–06. The league was subsequently renamed the Southern Counties East League in 2013. The club won both the Kent Senior Trophy and the League Cup in 2013–14, and went on to win the Roy Vinter Shield at the start of the 2014–15 season. In 2019–20 the club was top of the league when the season was abandoned due to the COVID-19 pandemic; this would have been the club's highest finish since reforming in 1971.

At the end of the 2020–21 season Beckenham were transferred to the Premier Division South of the Combined Counties League. During their first season in the Combined Counties League, Beckenham were Premier Division South champions, earning promotion to the Isthmian League. In their first season in the Isthmian League the club finished fourth, qualifying for the promotion play-offs. They went on to lose 1–0 to Whitehawk in the semi-finals. The following season saw them finish in the relegation zone of the South East Division, but they were reprieved from relegation. In 2025–26 they finished third-from-bottom of the division and were relegated to the Premier Division of the Southern Counties East League.

=== Seasons-by-season ===
Season	League										FA Cup	FA Vase	FA Trophy	League Cup	Notes
Season	Division	P	W	D	L	F	A	GD	Pts	Pos	FA Cup	FA Vase	FA Trophy	League Cup	Notes
1978–79	London Spartan League Premier Division	34	14	9	11	56	46	+10	37	6th	–	–	–	–	
1979–80	London Spartan League Premier Division	30	6	6	18	21	44	–23	18	14th	–	PRE	–	–	
1980–81	London Spartan League Premier Division	30	8	6	16	32	48	–16	22	14th	–	R4	–	–	
1981–82	London Spartan League Premier Division	26	8	8	10	28	24	+4	24	8th	–	PRE	–	–	
1982–83	Kent League Division One	32	12	9	11	46	46	0	33	9th	–	R1	–	–	
1983–84	Kent League Division One	30	12	6	12	56	54	+2	42	8th	PRE	R1	–	–	
1984–85	Kent League Division One	32	17	8	7	67	46	+21	59	4th	1QR	PRE	–	–	
1985–86	Kent League Division One	34	10	7	17	43	64	–21	37	15th	1QR	PRE	–	–	
1986–87	Kent League Division One	34	7	10	17	37	61	–24	31	15th	–	–	–	–	
1987–88	Kent League Division One	36	16	5	15	61	55	+6	53	8th	1QR	EPR	–	–	
1988–89	Kent League Division One	38	8	10	20	41	68	–27	34	17th	1QR	R2	–	–	
1989–90	Kent League Division One	38	12	10	16	52	59	–7	46	12th	PRE	R2	–	–	
1990–91	Kent League Division One	40	12	7	21	37	54	–17	43	14th	1QR	R1	–	–	
1991–92	Kent League Division One	40	13	10	17	52	67	–15	49	14th	1QR	PRE	–	–	
1992–93	Kent League Division One	40	17	8	15	64	60	+4	59	9th	2QR	R1	–	–	
1993–94	Kent League Division One	40	22	4	14	85	59	+26	70	7th	PRE	EPR	–	–	
1994–95	Kent League Division One	40	15	11	14	61	61	0	56	10th	–	R1	–	–	
1995–96	Kent League Division One	38	9	9	20	45	60	–15	36	16th	–	1QR	–	–	
1996–97	Kent League Division One	40	15	10	15	49	47	+2	55	11th	–	R2	–	–	
1997–98	Kent League Division One	42	21	7	14	67	54	+13	70	7th	–	2QR	–	–	Division renamed
1998–99	Kent League Premier Division	36	13	11	12	52	48	+4	50	9th	–	2QR	–	–	
1999–00	Kent League Premier Division	34	12	8	14	48	54	–6	44	10th	PRE	1QR	–	–	
2000–01	Kent League Premier Division	32	13	9	10	48	58	–10	48	7th	PRE	2QR	–	–	
2001–02	Kent League Premier Division	30	11	7	12	43	45	–2	40	9th	PRE	2QR	–	–	
2002–03	Kent League Premier Division	29	9	6	14	41	53	–12	33	10th	PRE	2QR	–	–	
2003–04	Kent League Premier Division	32	9	8	15	39	53	–14	35	12th	PRE	2QR	–	–	
2004–05	Kent League Premier Division	30	11	7	12	57	54	–3	39	10th	–	–	–	–	1 point deducted
2005–06	Kent League Premier Division	30	22	4	4	96	24	+72	70	2nd	–	–	–	–	
2006–07	Kent League Premier Division	32	12	4	16	64	52	+12	40	11th	–	–	–	–	
2007–08	Kent League Premier Division	32	21	7	4	80	41	+39	70	3rd	–	–	–	–	
2008–09	Kent League Premier Division	32	8	4	20	54	76	–22	28	14th	–	–	–	–	
2009–10	Kent League Premier Division	30	16	5	9	56	39	+17	53	4th	–	R3	–	SF	
2010–11	Kent League Premier Division	30	12	3	15	56	55	+1	39	10th	2QR	R3	–	R2	
2011–12	Kent League Premier Division	30	14	11	5	72	36	+36	53	6th	2QR	R1	–	R2	
2012–13	Kent League Premier Division	32	11	7	14	63	73	–10	40	11th	1QR	R1	–	PRE	Division renamed
2013–14	Southern Counties East League Premier Division	32	15	4	13	76	58	+18	49	8th	EPR	R3	–	W	
2014–15	Southern Counties East League Premier Division	38	16	5	17	77	63	+14	53	9th	EPR	2QR	–	SF	
2015–16	Southern Counties East League Premier Division	36	11	11	14	68	93	–25	44	12th	PRE	R2	–	R2	
2016–17	Southern Counties East League Premier Division	38	8	5	25	38	76	–38	29	18th	PRE	R1	–	R2	
2017–18	Southern Counties East League Premier Division	38	22	3	13	84	61	+23	69	4th	EPR	R3	–	R1	
2018–19	Southern Counties East League Premier Division	38	19	9	10	71	56	+15	66	5th	1QR	R1	–	R3	
2019–20	Southern Counties East League Premier Division	27	19	3	5	61	30	+31	60	1st	PRE	R1	–	SF	Season abandoned due to COVID-19 pandemic
2020–21	Southern Counties East League Premier Division	13	7	3	3	33	18	+15	24	5th	PRE	1QR	–	–	Season abandoned due to COVID-19 pandemic
2021–22	Combined Counties League Premier Division South	38	29	5	4	107	33	+74	92	1st	PRE	R3	–	R1	Promoted
2022–23	Isthmian League Division One South East	38	20	8	10	62	49	+73	68	4th	4QR	-	1QR	R1	Play-off semi final
2023–24	Isthmian League Division One South East	38	7	8	23	57	94	-37	29	19th	1QR	-	1QR	R1	Reprieved from relegation
2024–25	Isthmian League Division One South East	42	22	8	12	89	65	+24	74	6th	EPR	-	1QR		

== Ground ==
The club played at Stanhope Grove until July 1980 when they moved to Eden Park Avenue. The ground has a capacity of 4,000, of which 120 is seated and covered.

== Staff ==
- Manager: Mick McDonald (interim)
- Coach: Steve Alexander

== Honours ==
- London League
  - Division One champions 1927–28
- Combined Counties League
  - Premier Division South champions 2021–22
- Southern Counties East League
  - Challenge Cup winners 2013–14
  - Roy Vinter Shield winners 2014–15
- Kent Senior Trophy
  - Winners 2013–14

== Records ==
- Best FA Cup performance: Fourth qualifying round, 2022–23
- Best FA Trophy performance: Second qualifying round, 2025–26
- Best FA Vase performance: Fourth round, 1980–81
- Record attendance: 1,661 vs Dagenham & Redbridge, FA Cup fourth qualifying round, 15 October 2022
- Most appearances: Lee Fabian, 985
- Most goals: Ricky Bennett

== See also ==
- Beckenham Town F.C. players
- Beckenham Town F.C. managers
