= Swanley Furness F.C. =

- Nickname(s): The Cuckoos
- Founded: 1968
- Dissolved: 2005
- Ground: Greencourt Road, Crockenhill
- 2004–05: Kent League Division 2, 7th

Danson Furness F.C. was a football club based in Swanley, England. They were formed as Danson (Bexley Borough) and were playing in the London Spartan League by 1983, then entered the Kent League in 1987. After a merger with Furness F.C. in 1991 they became Danson Furness United, then after two seasons they changed it again to Furness. They won the Kent League title in 1996 and changed their name to Swanley Furness in 1997. In 1998, they dropped to Division Two of the Kent League due to the absence of floodlights. They later changed their name to Danson Furness and then left the Kent League in 2005 and folded.

Furness had been founded in 1968 as the football club of Furness Withy Shipping Group playing in the London Shipping League. They were based at Brackley Road, Beckenham in Kent. After the company withdrew its support in 1982 the name "Withy" was dropped but the football club continued to progress in the South London Alliance which it had joined in 1973.

Danson played at Crook Log in Bexleyheath. After the merger, the club moved in with Alma Swanley F.C., sharing the ground at Greencourt Road in Crockenhill. Alma Swanley folded in 1994 whereupon Furness leased the ground on their own. The club could not install floodlights and took a place in Kent League Division 2 instead of dropping down to the Kent County League as Crockenhill FC did the next year. This backfired on the club and only playing against Reserve teams outside the non-League pyramid probably led to the club's eventual demise.

Not known to have had an official nickname but were known as The Cuckoos by those running the village club, Crockenhill FC. The Crocks’ record win was 13–0 over Swanley Furness.

Furness v Cray Wanderers at Greencourt Road, November 1996

== Records ==
- FA Vase
  - Third Round 1995–96
