= 2003–04 Kent Football League =

The 2003–04 Kent Football League season (known as the Go Travel Kent League for sponsorship reasons) was the 38th in the history of Kent Football League a football competition in England.

The League structure comprised three divisions: a Premier Division together with a Reserves Section comprising newly formed Divisions One and Two – the latter two made from teams featured in previous seasons Division One North and Division One South, with the six highest ranked teams from each division from the previous season placed in the new Division One and the remaining clubs into Division Two. Reserves teams were not permitted in the Premier Division. Additionally there were two league cup competitions: the Challenge Cup for the Premier Division clubs and another for the teams in the two divisions of the Reserves Section.

== Premier Division ==
Kent Football League Premier Division
- Season: 2003–04
- Champions: Cray Wanderers
- Promoted: Cray Wanderers
- Matches: 272
- Goals: 881 (3.24 per match)

The league featured 17 clubs, 15 of which competed in the previous season together with two additional clubs:

- Sevenoaks Town, joined from the Kent County League
- Sporting Bengal United, joined from the London Intermediate League

At the end of the season Cray Wanderers were promoted to the Isthmian League Division One.

=== League table ===
| Pos | Team | Pld | W | D | L | GF | GA | GD | Pts | Promotion |
|---|---|---|---|---|---|---|---|---|---|---|
| 1 | Cray Wanderers | 32 | 22 | 4 | 6 | 88 | 35 | +53 | 70 | Promoted to the Isthmian League Division One |
| 2 | Thamesmead Town | 32 | 22 | 3 | 7 | 72 | 38 | +34 | 69 | |
| 3 | VCD Athletic | 32 | 21 | 5 | 6 | 65 | 29 | +36 | 68 | |
| 4 | Maidstone United | 32 | 19 | 10 | 3 | 71 | 30 | +41 | 67 | |
| 5 | Whitstable Town | 32 | 19 | 5 | 8 | 77 | 52 | +25 | 62 | |
| 6 | Hythe Town | 32 | 17 | 7 | 8 | 51 | 41 | +10 | 58 | |
| 7 | Erith Town | 32 | 17 | 2 | 13 | 53 | 45 | +8 | 53 | |
| 8 | Greenwich Borough | 32 | 14 | 8 | 10 | 57 | 53 | +4 | 50 | |
| 9 | Ramsgate | 32 | 11 | 11 | 10 | 49 | 46 | +3 | 44 | |
| 10 | Herne Bay | 32 | 11 | 7 | 14 | 50 | 49 | +1 | 40 | |
| 11 | Sevenoaks Town | 32 | 12 | 1 | 19 | 40 | 57 | −17 | 37 | |
| 12 | Beckenham Town | 32 | 9 | 8 | 15 | 39 | 53 | −14 | 35 | |
| 13 | Lordswood | 32 | 9 | 5 | 18 | 34 | 68 | −34 | 32 | |
| 14 | Tunbridge Wells | 32 | 8 | 6 | 18 | 30 | 57 | −27 | 30 | |
| 15 | Slade Green | 32 | 7 | 8 | 17 | 42 | 47 | −5 | 29 | |
| 16 | Deal Town | 32 | 5 | 4 | 23 | 37 | 71 | −34 | 19 | |
| 17 | Sporting Bengal United | 32 | 1 | 2 | 29 | 26 | 110 | −84 | 5 | |

Source: FCHD
Rules for classification: 1) points; 2) goal difference; 3) number of goals scored.

=== Results ===
| Home \ Away | BEC | CRA | DEA | ERI | GRE | HER | HYT | LOR | MAI | RAM | SEV | SLA | SPB | THA | TUN | VCD | WHI |
|---|---|---|---|---|---|---|---|---|---|---|---|---|---|---|---|---|---|
| Beckenham Town | | 0–2 | 4–0 | 0–2 | 0–2 | 1–1 | 0–0 | 1–2 | 0–7 | 1–1 | 3–0 | 0–0 | 4–1 | 3–0 | 1–2 | 0–1 | 1–3 |
| Cray Wanderers | 3–1 | | 4–0 | 1–0 | 1–3 | 2–1 | 3–1 | 3–0 | 2–3 | 4–1 | 2–0 | 2–0 | 10–0 | 3–1 | 1–1 | 1–1 | 2–3 |
| Deal Town | 0–0 | 1–5 | | 0–2 | 1–3 | 1–2 | 0–2 | 1–3 | 1–2 | 2–4 | 0–2 | 2–1 | 7–0 | 2–5 | 0–2 | 0–1 | 0–3 |
| Erith Town | 3–0 | 1–4 | 2–1 | | 4–2 | 2–0 | 1–1 | 0–2 | 3–2 | 1–4 | 2–1 | 2–1 | 6–0 | 1–1 | 2–0 | 1–3 | 3–0 |
| Greenwich Borough | 1–3 | 0–4 | 3–3 | 1–0 | | 3–1 | 0–3 | 2–0 | 1–0 | 1–0 | 2–1 | 3–1 | 2–0 | 1–1 | 1–1 | 1–1 | 2–2 |
| Herne Bay | 3–1 | 0–2 | 3–3 | 4–2 | 4–0 | | 0–1 | 3–0 | 1–2 | 0–3 | 3–1 | 0–1 | 1–0 | 1–1 | 1–0 | 0–1 | 0–2 |
| Hythe Town | 1–3 | 1–1 | 3–2 | 1–0 | 2–1 | 3–1 | | 3–1 | 1–4 | 3–0 | 4–1 | 1–0 | 2–0 | 0–4 | 0–0 | 2–1 | 1–0 |
| Lordswood | 1–1 | 1–5 | 2–1 | 0–2 | 3–3 | 0–4 | 1–3 | | 1–1 | 0–0 | 0–1 | 1–0 | 3–0 | 0–3 | 0–0 | 0–5 | 2–4 |
| Maidstone United | 0–0 | 2–1 | 5–0 | 1–0 | 2–0 | 2–2 | 1–1 | 4–0 | | 2–2 | 1–1 | 3–2 | 2–1 | 1–0 | 0–0 | 2–1 | 1–1 |
| Ramsgate | 1–1 | 1–2 | 0–3 | 0–2 | 2–2 | 1–1 | 1–1 | 2–1 | 1–1 | | 1–0 | 0–0 | 6–0 | 4–3 | 3–1 | 0–0 | 1–4 |
| Sevenoaks Town | 1–2 | 0–3 | 2–1 | 3–0 | 1–3 | 1–0 | 2–1 | 3–1 | 0–3 | 1–4 | | 3–0 | 3–2 | 0–3 | 0–1 | 1–2 | 3–2 |
| Slade Green | 0–2 | 2–2 | 2–0 | 1–2 | 3–3 | 2–2 | 1–4 | 4–0 | 1–1 | 0–1 | 0–1 | | 4–1 | 0–2 | 1–1 | 1–2 | 6–1 |
| Sporting Bengal United | 0–2 | 2–3 | 0–2 | 2–4 | 0–5 | 1–1 | 0–3 | 0–1 | 1–5 | 2–2 | 0–3 | 1–4 | | 1–4 | 2–5 | 1–3 | 0–5 |
| Thamesmead Town | 2–0 | 3–2 | 2–1 | 1–0 | 2–0 | 3–0 | 4–0 | 4–2 | 0–4 | 2–0 | 4–1 | 1–0 | 3–2 | | 3–2 | 1–0 | 2–4 |
| Tunbridge Wells | 3–2 | 0–3 | 0–1 | 0–2 | 1–4 | 3–2 | 2–1 | 2–3 | 1–3 | 1–3 | 1–0 | 0–3 | 0–4 | 0–1 | | 0–4 | 0–4 |
| VCD Athletic | 4–0 | 1–3 | 2–1 | 5–0 | 2–0 | 2–5 | 5–0 | 1–0 | 1–2 | 2–0 | 2–1 | 0–0 | 3–2 | 3–2 | 1–0 | | 4–1 |
| Whitstable Town | 6–2 | 4–2 | 0–0 | 3–1 | 4–2 | 2–3 | 1–1 | 2–3 | 3–2 | 2–0 | 4–2 | 3–1 | 2–0 | 0–4 | 1–0 | 1–1 | |

Source: Herne Bay FC: team pages (archived)
Legend: Blue = home team win; Yellow = draw; Red = away team win.

=== Challenge Cup ===
The 2003–04 Kent Football League Challenge Cup was won by Thamesmead Town.

The competition was contested by the 17 teams from the Premier Division, following a preliminary round there were four further rounds: the first two a single match knock-out followed by the semis-finals on an aggregate basis (home and away matches) and the final match played on a neutral ground (at Folkestone Invicta F.C. this season).

==== Quarter-finals, Semi-finals and Final ====
Quarter-finals
Deal Town | 0
Herne Bay | 1
Erith Town | 0
Cray Wanderers | 1
Thamesmead Town | 3
Ramsgate | 0
Hythe Town | 0
Maidstone United | 1

Semi-finals
Herne Bay | 1 | 2 | 3
Cray Wanderers | 4 | 0 | 4
Thamesmead Town | 2 | 3 (Note: after extra time) | 5
Maidstone United | 0 | 4 | 4

Final
Cray Wanderers | 0
Thamesmead Town | 1

==== First Round ====
- Deal Town 6 – 2 Sporting Bengal United
- Sevenoaks Town 1– 2 Herne Bay
- Erith Town 1 – 0 Slade Green
- Cray Wanderers 2 – 1 Tunbridge Wells
- Greenwich Borough 1 – 0 Thamesmead Town
- Whitstable Town 0– 1 Ramsgate
- Lordswood 0 – 1 (aet) Hythe Town
- Maidstone United 6 – 1 Beckenham Town

==== Preliminary Round ====
- VCD Athletic 2 – 4 Herne Bay

Sources: Herne Bay FC: team pages (archived)

== Reserves Section ==
The letter "R" following team names indicates a club's reserves team.

The 2003–04 Reserves Section comprised two new divisions with promotion and relegation possible between them. They were formed from the previous seasons Division One North and Division One South, with the six highest ranked teams from each division from the previous season placed in the new Division One and the remaining clubs into Division Two. Promotion from the Reserves Section into the Premier Division was not permitted. There was a single League Cup competition for all teams in the section.

=== Division One ===
Kent Football League Division One
- Season: 2003–04
- Champions: Corinthian
- Matches: 132
- Goals: 472 (3.58 per match)

The newly formed single Division One featured twelve clubs, the six highest ranked teams from each of the previous seasons Division One North (Cray Wanderers R, Thamesmead Town R, Danson Furness, Corinthian, Erith Town R and Dartford R) and Division One South (Deal Town R, Herne Bay R, Dover Athletic R, Ashford Town (Kent) R, Ramsgate R and Hastings United R).

At the end of the season champions Corinthian and runners-up Dover Athletic R resigned from the league – the former were the only non-reserves team to have won a division in the Reserves Section.

==== League table ====
| Pos | Team | Pld | W | D | L | GF | GA | GD | Pts | Season End Notes |
|---|---|---|---|---|---|---|---|---|---|---|
| 1 | Corinthian | 22 | 15 | 4 | 3 | 79 | 32 | +47 | 49 | Resigned from the League |
| 2 | Dover Athletic R | 22 | 14 | 4 | 4 | 61 | 30 | +31 | 46 | Resigned from the League |
| 3 | Thamesmead Town R | 22 | 11 | 4 | 7 | 42 | 25 | +17 | 37 | |
| 4 | Hastings United R | 22 | 11 | 1 | 10 | 47 | 53 | −6 | 34 | |
| 5 | Herne Bay R (Note: Danson Furness v Herne Bay R ruled 0–0 draw, one point to each team) | 22 | 9 | 6 | 7 | 37 | 34 | +3 | 33 | |
| 6 | Cray Wanderers R | 22 | 8 | 6 | 8 | 33 | 34 | −1 | 30 | |
| 7 | Ashford Town (Kent) R | 22 | 8 | 3 | 11 | 29 | 37 | −8 | 27 | |
| 8 | Erith Town R | 22 | 7 | 6 | 9 | 32 | 42 | −10 | 27 | |
| 9 | Deal Town R | 22 | 7 | 2 | 13 | 29 | 43 | −14 | 23 | |
| 10 | Danson Furness | 22 | 6 | 5 | 11 | 30 | 49 | −19 | 23 | |
| 11 | Ramsgate R | 22 | 5 | 7 | 10 | 26 | 52 | −26 | 22 | |
| 12 | Dartford R | 22 | 5 | 4 | 13 | 30 | 44 | −14 | 19 | |

Source: FCHD (team pages) & Kent League: Danson Furness v Herne Bay (archived)
Rules for classification: 1) points; 2) goal difference; 3) number of goals scored.

==== Results ====
| Home \ Away | ASH | COR | CRA | DAN | DAR | DEA | DOV | ERI | HAS | HER | RAM | THA |
|---|---|---|---|---|---|---|---|---|---|---|---|---|
| Ashford Town (Kent) R | | 2–2 | 0–2 | 1–0 | 7–0 | 2–4 | 2–1 | 0–1 | 3–2 | 1–2 | 2–0 | 3–2 |
| Corinthian | 1–0 | | 6–3 | 11–0 | 2–1 | 5–2 | 1–3 | 3–0 | 7–1 | 5–1 | 7–1 | 5–0 |
| Cray Wanderers R | 1–1 | 1–5 | | 4–1 | 0–0 | 1–2 | 0–2 | 3–0 | 1–2 | 1–2 | 0–0 | 1–0 |
| Danson Furness | 4–0 | 2–5 | 3–4 | | 2–1 | 0–3 | 1–2 | 2–2 | 2–1 | – (Note: unplayed match; ruled as 0–0 draw, one point to each team) | 0–1 | 3–2 |
| Dartford R | 4–0 | 1–1 | 1–3 | 2–1 | | 0–1 | 1–2 | 0–0 | 6–0 | 0–4 | 4–1 | 2–2 |
| Deal Town R | 0–0 | 3–3 | 0–1 | 0–1 | 2–0 | | 0–3 | 0–2 | 5–1 | 1–2 | 0–2 | 0–5 |
| Dover Athletic R | 2–0 | 4–2 | 1–1 | 1–3 | 3–2 | 3–1 | | 2–2 | 5–2 | 3–1 | 10–0 | 1–1 |
| Erith Town R | 0–1 | 0–4 | 0–0 | 3–3 | 3–1 | 4–1 | 0–4 | | 3–4 | 3–0 | 2–2 | 1–2 |
| Hastings United R | 1–2 | 6–1 | 2–1 | 3–0 (Note: score of match abandoned after 82 minutes at 3–0 allowed to stand as final result) | 1–0 | 1–3 | 3–2 | 5–1 | | 3–1 | 4–4 | 3–1 |
| Herne Bay R | 1–0 | 1–1 | 3–3 | 1–1 | 1–2 | 3–1 | 5–0 | 4–0 | 2–0 | | 1–1 | 0–1 |
| Ramsgate R | 4–2 | 0–1 | 1–2 | 1–1 | 3–2 | 3–0 | 0–5 | 0–2 | 0–2 | 2–2 | | 0–3 |
| Thamesmead Town R | 3–0 | 0–1 | 2–0 | 1–0 | 5–0 | 1–0 | 2–2 | 1–3 | 3–0 | 5–0 | 0–0 | |

Source: Herne Bay FC: team pages (archived) & Cray Wanderers FC (archived) & Kent League: Danson Furness v Herne Bay (archived) & Kent League: Amendment to Division One Table – Hastings United v Danson Furness (archived) & FCHD (team pages)
Legend: Blue = home team win; Yellow = draw; Red = away team win.

=== Division Two ===
Kent Football League Division Two
- Season: 2003–04
- Champions: Erith & Belvedere R
- Matches: 156
- Goals: 570 (3.65 per match)

The newly formed Division Two featured thirteen clubs, the six lowest ranked teams from the previous seasons Division One North (Chatham Town R, Beckenham Town R, Tunbridge Wells R, Lordswood R, VCD Athletic R and Erith & Belvedere R) and five (following the withdrawal of Margate R) from Division One South (Sittingbourne R, Folkestone Invicta R, Maidstone United R, Whitstable Town R and Hythe Town R) together with two additional clubs:

- Sevenoaks Town R
- Groundhoppers (a north Kent based club)

At the end of the season Erith & Belvedere R and Maidstone United R were promoted to Division One and Groundhoppers left the League after one season.

==== League table ====
| Pos | Team | Pld | W | D | L | GF | GA | GD | Pts | Season End Notes |
|---|---|---|---|---|---|---|---|---|---|---|
| 1 | Erith & Belvedere R | 24 | 15 | 6 | 3 | 56 | 21 | +35 | 51 | Promoted to Division One |
| 2 | Maidstone United R | 24 | 14 | 4 | 6 | 57 | 33 | +24 | 46 | Promoted to Division One |
| 3 | Beckenham Town R | 24 | 14 | 4 | 6 | 51 | 30 | +21 | 46 | |
| 4 | Whitstable Town R | 24 | 13 | 6 | 5 | 50 | 36 | +14 | 45 | |
| 5 | Sevenoaks Town R | 24 | 13 | 5 | 6 | 45 | 39 | +6 | 44 | |
| 6 | Groundhoppers | 24 | 13 | 2 | 9 | 59 | 47 | +12 | 41 | Resigned from the League |
| 7 | Chatham Town R | 24 | 10 | 8 | 6 | 54 | 37 | +17 | 38 | |
| 8 | Hythe Town R | 24 | 10 | 3 | 11 | 30 | 39 | −9 | 33 | |
| 9 | Folkestone Invicta R | 24 | 7 | 3 | 14 | 43 | 47 | −4 | 24 | |
| 10 | Tunbridge Wells R | 24 | 6 | 4 | 14 | 36 | 67 | −31 | 22 | |
| 11 | Lordswood R | 24 | 5 | 3 | 16 | 26 | 54 | −28 | 18 | |
| 12 | Sittingbourne R | 24 | 4 | 5 | 15 | 27 | 63 | −36 | 17 | |
| 13 | VCD Athletic R | 24 | 4 | 3 | 17 | 36 | 57 | −21 | 15 | |

Source: FCHD (team pages)
Rules for classification: 1) points; 2) goal difference; 3) number of goals scored.

==== Results ====
| Home \ Away | BEC | CHA | EAB | FOL | GRO | HYT | LOR | MAI | SEV | SIT | TUN | VCD | WHI |
|---|---|---|---|---|---|---|---|---|---|---|---|---|---|
| Beckenham Town R | | 3–4 | 2–0 | 4–3 | 0–2 | 3–1 | 2–1 | 0–1 | 3–0 | 3–2 | 7–1 | 2–0 | 1–4 |
| Chatham Town R | 1–1 | | 1–0 | 5–2 | 1–3 | 1–1 | 3–1 | 1–4 | 0–1 | 1–1 | 4–0 | 3–0 | 1–2 |
| Erith & Belvedere R | 2–0 | 1–1 | | 1–0 | 3–1 | 0–0 | 1–1 | 2–0 | 4–2 | 2–2 | 5–1 | 5–1 | 1–0 |
| Folkestone Invicta R | 0–0 | 2–3 | 1–2 | | 1–3 | 1–0 | 3–0 | 0–2 | 1–2 | 3–0 | 4–4 | 1–2 | 0–1 |
| Groundhoppers | 0–2 | 3–3 | 3–6 | 0–2 | | 1–1 | 4–0 | 2–3 | 0–3 | 8–0 | 3–2 | 2–1 | 0–2 |
| Hythe Town R | 0–1 | 2–1 | 0–5 | 2–0 | 2–3 | | 1–0 | 1–0 | 0–2 | 3–0 | 4–3 | 4–3 | 3–0 |
| Lordswood R | 0–4 | 3–3 | 2–1 | 1–4 | 1–2 | 3–0 | | 2–3 | 1–3 | 2–0 | 2–0 | 0–2 | 1–4 |
| Maidstone United R | 1–1 | 1–2 | 1–1 | 5–0 | 5–3 | 2–0 | 5–0 | | 2–3 | 4–1 | 4–1 | 1–0 | 2–2 |
| Sevenoaks Town R | 0–3 | 3–1 | 2–2 | 2–2 | 4–3 | 0–1 | 4–1 | 3–2 | | 1–0 | 3–1 | 2–1 | 1–1 |
| Sittingbourne R | 2–3 | 0–0 | 0–1 | 0–5 | 1–2 | 1–0 | 1–4 | 0–0 | 4–2 | | 3–3 | 3–1 | 1–2 |
| Tunbridge Wells R | 1–0 | 0–8 | 0–2 | 3–1 | 1–5 | 4–0 | 2–0 | 0–1 | 2–2 | 0–2 | | 2–1 | 0–2 |
| VCD Athletic R | 3–5 | 1–4 | 0–5 | 1–4 | 2–4 | 1–2 | 0–0 | 2–4 | 4–0 | 7–0 | 2–2 | | 0–1 |
| Whitstable Town R | 1–1 | 2–2 | 0–4 | 4–3 | 1–2 | 4–2 | 2–0 | 6–4 | 0–0 | 6–3 | 2–3 | 1–1 | |

Source: Herne Bay FC: team pages (archived) & FCHD (team pages)
Legend: Blue = home team win; Yellow = draw; Red = away team win.

=== Reserves Cup ===
The 2003–04 Kent Football League Reserves Cup was won by Cray Wanderers R.

The competition was contested by all 25 teams of the Reserves Section over a total of five rounds: the first three were single match knock-out rounds, followed by the semi-finals on an aggregate basis (home and away matches) and then the final match played on a neutral ground (at Chatham Town F.C. this season).

==== Quarter-finals, Semi-finals and Final ====
Quarter-finals
Groundhoppers | 0
Sevenoaks Town R | 1
Cray Wanderers R | 1
Thamesmead Town R | 0
Corinthian | 7
Dover Athletic R | 0
Dartford R | 0
Maidstone United R | 2

Semi-finals
Sevenoaks Town R
Cray Wanderers R
Corinthian
Maidstone United R

Final
Cray Wanderers R | 1 (Note: after extra-time, score after 90 minutes: 0–0)
Maidstone United R | 0

==== Second Round ====
- Groundhoppers – Whitstable Town R
- Sevenoaks Town R – Lordswood R
- Folkestone Invicta R 0 – 3 Cray Wanderers R
- Thamesmead Town R – Chatham Town R
- Erith Town R 0 – 4 Corinthian
- Ashford Town (Kent) R 2 – 3 Dover Athletic R
- Dartford R – Hastings United R
- Erith & Belvedere R 0 – 2 Maidstone United R

==== First Round ====
- Hythe Town R 2 – 2 Groundhoppers (Groundhoppers won on penalties 5–4)
- Whitstable Town R 2 – 0 Danson Furness
- Folkestone Invicta R 2 – 0 Tunbridge Wells R
- Thamesmead Town R 4 – 2 Beckenham Town R
- Erith & Belvedere R 5 – 0 Ramsgate R
- Corinthian 3– 1 (aet) VCD Athletic R
- Sittingbourne R 2 – 3 Cray Wanderers R
- Ashford Town (Kent) R 2 – 0 (aet) Herne Bay R
- Maidstone United Rv 2– 0 Deal Town R

Byes for the remaining seven clubs

Sources: Kent League (archived) & Herne Bay FC: team pages (archived) & Beckenham Town FC: results (archived)
