= 2002–03 Kent Football League =

The 2002–03 Kent Football League season (known as the Go Travel Kent League for sponsorship reasons) was the 37th in the history of Kent Football League a football competition in England.

The League structure comprised three divisions: a Premier Division together with a Reserves Section comprising two equal ranked geographically based divisions known as Division One North and Division One South – with a play-off between the winners of these two divisions to decide the Division One champion. Reserves teams were not permitted in the Premier Division. Additionally there were two league cup competitions: the Challenge Cup for the Premier Division clubs and another for the teams in the Reserves Section.

== Premier Division ==
Kent Football League Premier Division
- Season: 2002–03
- Champions: Cray Wanderers
- Matches: 232
- Goals: 825 (3.56 per match)

The league featured 16 clubs which competed in the previous season, no new clubs joined the league this season.

Faversham Town resigned towards the end of the season with eight games to play. As per league rules as they resigned after 1 March their record was not expunged and, owing to the resulting unequal number of matches played by the remaining clubs, the final league positions were decided on a points per game basis.

=== League table ===
Pos	Team	Pld	W	D	L	GF	GA	GD	Pts	PPG	Promotion
1	Cray Wanderers	29	19	5	5	68	23	+45	62	2.14	
2	Maidstone United	30	18	9	3	76	31	+45	63	2.10	
3	Thamesmead Town	30	19	6	5	76	39	+37	63	2.10	
4	Deal Town	28	15	9	4	62	40	+22	54	1.93	
5	Ramsgate	30	16	7	7	59	35	+24	55	1.83	
6	Whitstable Town	29	15	8	6	56	45	+11	53	1.83	
7	VCD Athletic	30	13	9	8	51	36	+15	48	1.60	
8	Hythe Town	30	13	6	11	46	54	−8	45	1.50	
9	Slade Green	29	10	5	14	57	54	+3	35	1.21	
10	Beckenham Town	29	9	6	14	41	53	−12	33	1.14	
11	Herne Bay	30	9	7	14	53	54	−1	34	1.13	
12	Tunbridge Wells	29	7	8	14	53	66	−13	29	1.00	
13	Lordswood	30	5	9	16	37	66	−29	24	0.80	
14	Greenwich Borough	30	5	5	20	36	70	−34	20	0.67	
15	Erith Town	29	4	6	19	36	71	−35	18	0.62	
16	Faversham Town	22	2	1	19	18	88	−70	7 (Note: Faversham Town resigned with eight games to play. Their record was not expunged, but final league positions were decided on a points per game basis.)	0.32	Resigned from the league

Source: FCHD
Rules for classification: 1) points per game.

=== Challenge Cup ===
The 2002–03 Kent Football League Challenge Cup was won by Cray Wanderers who completed the League and Cup double.

The competition was contested by the 16 teams from the Premier Division over four rounds: the first two a single match knock-out followed by the semis-finals on an aggregate basis (home and away matches) and the final match played on a neutral ground (at Folkestone Invicta F.C. this season).

==== Quarter-finals, Semi-finals and Final ====
Quarter-finals
Tunbridge Wells	3
Herne Bay	2
Maidstone United	0
Cray Wanderers	2
Deal Town	3
Slade Green	2
VCD Athletic	2 (Note: after extra time)
Erith Town	0

Semi-finals
Tunbridge Wells	0	1	1
Cray Wanderers	2	3	5
Deal Town	0	0	0
VCD Athletic	1	3	4

Final
Cray Wanderers	2
VCD Athletic	0

==== First Round ====
- Tunbridge Wells v Hythe Town
- Beckenham Town v Herne Bay
- Faversham Town 2 – 5 Maidstone United
- Cray Wanderers 2 – 1 Thamesmead Town
- Deal Town v Greenwich Borough
- Lordswood v Slade Green
- VCD Athletic v Ramsgate
- Erith Town 1 – 0 Whitstable Town

Sources: Beckenham Town FC: Cup Draws & Results (archived) & Herne Bay FC (archived)

== Reserves Section ==
The letter "R" following team names indicates a club's reserves team.

The 2002–03 Reserves Section comprised two equal ranked geographically based divisions, Division One North and Division One South. The top club in each division played a single match to decide the Division One Champion. Promotion from the Reserves Section into the Premier Division was not permitted. There was a single League Cup competition for all teams in the section.

=== Division One Champion Play-off ===
Deal Town R were the Division One champions. They won the single play-off match, played at Herne Bay F.C., between the top team from each of the Division One North and Division One South:

- Cray Wanderers R 2 – 3 Deal Town R

=== Division One North ===
Kent Football League Division One North
- Season: 2002–03
- Champions: Cray Wanderers R
- Matches: 131
- Goals: 513 (3.92 per match)

The division featured 12 clubs, 10 of which had competed in the previous season together with two additional clubs:

- Corinthian, returning to the Kent League after resigning in 1998 from Division One (subsequently renamed the Premier Division).
- Erith & Belvedere R

Prior to the season the Swanley Furness club was renamed Danson Furness

At the end of the season the top six teams were moved to the newly formed Division One and the bottom six to the newly formed Division Two.

==== League table ====
Pos	Team	Pld	W	D	L	GF	GA	GD	Pts	Season End Notes
1	Cray Wanderers R	22	18	2	2	68	18	+50	56	Moved to Division One
2	Thamesmead Town R	21	16	0	5	65	34	+31	48	Moved to Division One
3	Danson Furness	22	12	4	6	52	39	+13	40	Moved to Division One
4	Corinthian	22	11	3	8	44	40	+4	36	Moved to Division One
5	Erith Town R	21	10	3	8	33	39	−6	33	Moved to Division One
6	Dartford R	22	10	4	8	30	26	+4	31 (Note: Dartford R were deducted three points)	Moved to Division One
7	Chatham Town R	22	8	6	8	47	38	+9	30	Moved to Division Two
8	Beckenham Town R	22	7	3	12	40	59	−19	24	Moved to Division Two
9	Tunbridge Wells R	22	7	3	12	34	56	−22	24	Moved to Division Two
10	Lordswood R	22	4	6	12	27	44	−17	18	Moved to Division Two
11	VCD Athletic R	32	5	12	15	44	58	−14	27	Moved to Division Two
12	Erith & Belvedere R	22	3	4	15	29	62	−33	16 (Note: Erith & Belvedere R were awarded three points)	Moved to Division Two

Source: Beckenham Town FC: Final League Tables 2002/03 (archived) & FCHD (team pages)
Rules for classification: 1) points; 2) goal difference; 3) number of goals scored.

=== Division One South ===
Kent Football League Division One South
- Season: 2002–03
- Champions: Deal Town R
- Matches: 132
- Goals: 516 (3.91 per match)

The division featured 12 clubs, 11 of which had competed in the previous season together with one additional club:

- Maidstone United R

Prior to the season the Hastings Town club was renamed Hastings United

At the end of the season the top six teams were moved to the newly formed Division One, Margate R resigned from the league and the remaining five clubs were moved to the newly formed Division Two.

==== League table ====
Pos	Team	Pld	W	D	L	GF	GA	GD	Pts	Season End Notes
1	Deal Town R	22	13	7	2	55	25	+30	46	Moved to Division One
2	Dover Athletic R	22	12	6	4	69	35	+34	42	Moved to Division One
3	Herne Bay R	22	11	8	3	47	26	+21	41	Moved to Division One
4	Ashford Town (Kent) R	22	12	3	7	43	26	+17	39	Moved to Division One
5	Ramsgate R	22	11	2	9	41	42	−1	35	Moved to Division One
6	Hastings United R	22	9	5	8	40	27	+13	32	Moved to Division One
7	Sittingbourne R	22	9	2	11	45	69	−24	26 (Note: Sittingbourne R were deducted three points)	Moved to Division Two
8	Folkestone Invicta R	22	7	4	11	49	52	−3	25	Moved to Division Two
9	Maidstone United R	22	6	7	9	38	43	−5	25	Moved to Division Two
10	Whitstable Town R	22	5	5	12	35	46	−11	23 (Note: Whitstable Town R were awarded three points)	Moved to Division Two
11	Margate R	22	5	7	10	29	46	−17	22	Resigned from the League
12	Hythe Town R	22	3	2	17	25	79	−54	11	Moved to Division Two

Source: FCHD (team pages)
Rules for classification: 1) points; 2) goal difference; 3) number of goals scored.

=== Division One Cup ===
The 2002–03 Kent Football League Division One Cup was won by Cray Wanderers R.

The competition was contested by all 24 teams from both the Division One leagues over a total of five rounds: the first two were on an aggregate home and away basis; the third round, the quarter-finals a single match; the semis finals again on an aggregate basis; and a single final match which was played on a neutral ground (played at Ashford Town (Kent) F.C. this season).

==== Quarter-finals, Semi-finals and Final ====
Quarter-finals
Sittingbourne R	2 (Note: After extra time, score at 90 mins:1–1)	4p (Note: Sittingbourne R won on penalties)
Maidstone United R	2	3p
Cray Wanderers R
Erith Town R
Hastings United R	1
Dartford R	3
Dover Athletic R	2
Beckenham Town R	1

Semi-finals
Sittingbourne R	0	1	1
Cray Wanderers R	4	5	9
Dartford R	0	0	0
Dover Athletic R	4	1	5

Final
Cray Wanderers R	3
Dover Athletic R	2

==== Second Round ====
(Matches played on an aggregate home and away basis)

- Tunbridge Wells R v Erith Town R
- Ashford Town (Kent) R v Dover Athletic R
- Maidstone United R 5 – 3 Danson Furness (3–0; 2–3)
- Corinthian 2 – 3 Hastings United R (1–2; 1–1)
- Hythe Town R 1 – 6 Dartford R (1–3; 0–3)
- Deal Town R v Cray Wanderers R
- Herne Bay R 2 – 5 Sittingbourne R (1–3; 1–2)
- Lordswood R 1–3 Beckenham Town R (0–0; 1–3)

==== First Round ====
(Matches played on an aggregate home and away basis)

- Corinthian v Chatham Town R
- Cray Wanderers R v Folkestone Invicta R
- Dartford R v Margate R
- Dover Athletic R 9 – 2 Erith & Belvedere R (8–1; 1–1)
- Thamesmead Town R v Danson Furness
- Tunbridge Wells R v Ramsgate R
- VCD Athletic R v Deal Town R
- Whitstable Town R 0 – 6 Herne Bay R (0–2; 0–4)

Byes for the remaining eight clubs

Sources: Herne Bay FC: team pages (archived) & Beckenham Town FC: results (archived)
