= 2000–01 Kent Football League =

The 2000–01 Kent Football League season (known as the Bass Brewers Kent League for sponsorship reasons) was the 35th in the history of Kent Football League a football competition in England.

The League structure comprised two divisions: a Premier Division together with a Reserves Section single Division One, the latter being an amalgamation of two geographically based divisions from the previous season. Reserves teams were not permitted in the Premier Division. Additionally there were two league cup competitions: the Challenge Cup for the Premier Division clubs and another for the teams in the Reserves Section.

== Premier Division ==
Kent Football League Premier Division
- Season: 2000–01
- Champions: Chatham Town
- Promoted: Chatham Town
- Matches: 272
- Goals: 879 (3.23 per match)

The league featured 18 clubs which competed in the previous season, no new clubs joined the league this season.

During the season Sheppey United resigned from the league and their record was expunged.

The league was won by Chatham Town who were promoted to the Southern League Eastern Division.

The Canterbury City club folded and left the league.

=== League table ===
Pos	Team	Pld	W	D	L	GF	GA	GD	Pts	Season end notes
1	Chatham Town	32	23	7	2	76	28	+48	76	Promoted to the Southern League Eastern Division
2	Herne Bay	32	23	5	4	93	43	+50	74	
3	VCD Athletic	32	21	4	7	74	32	+42	67	
4	Thamesmead Town	32	18	8	6	63	29	+34	62	
5	Ramsgate	32	15	10	7	83	36	+47	55	
6	Tunbridge Wells	32	13	11	8	52	41	+11	50	
7	Beckenham Town	32	13	9	10	48	58	−10	48	
8	Whitstable Town	32	12	9	11	43	44	−1	45	
9	Greenwich Borough	32	12	8	12	46	40	+6	44	
10	Lordswood	32	12	7	13	57	55	+2	43	
11	Erith Town	32	13	4	15	42	49	−7	43	
12	Cray Wanderers	32	10	5	17	39	46	−7	35	
13	Slade Green	32	9	3	20	33	75	−42	30	
14	Hythe United	32	6	11	15	41	46	−5	29	
15	Deal Town	32	7	8	17	41	60	−19	29	
16	Faversham Town	32	6	5	21	33	68	−35	23	
17	Canterbury City	32	0	4	28	15	129	−114	4	Club folded
18	Sheppey United	0	0	0	0	0	0	0	0	Resigned from the league, record expunged

Source: FCHD
Rules for classification: 1) points; 2) goal difference; 3) number of goals scored.

=== Challenge Cup ===
The 2000–01 Kent Football League Challenge Cup was contested by the 18 teams from the Premier Division and won by Ramsgate who defeated Greenwich Borough in the final.

== Reserves Section ==
The letter "R" following team names indicates a club's reserves team.

The 2000–01 Reserves Section comprised a single Division One which was an amalgamation of the two geographically based divisions from the previous season. The promotion of reserves teams into the Premier Division was not permitted. There was a single League Cup competition for the teams in the section.

=== Division One ===
Kent Football League Division One
- Season: 2000–01
- Champions: Thamesmead Town R

The division featured 20 clubs, all 11 from the previous seasons Division One North and nine of the ten from the previous seasons Division One South (Deal Town R had resigned). The clubs competing were:

- Ashford Town (Kent) R
- Beckenham Town R
- Chatham Town R
- Cray Wanderers R
- Dartford R
- Dover Athletic R
- Erith Town R
- Folkestone Invicta R
- Greenwich Borough R
- Hastings Town R
- Herne Bay R
- Hythe United R
- Lordswood R
- Margate R
- Ramsgate R
- Sittingbourne R
- Swanley Furness
- Thamesmead Town R
- VCD Athletic R
- Whitstable Town R

The division was won for the second successive season by Thamesmead Town R with Margate R the runners-up.

At the end of the season the single Division One was split into two geographic based divisions, Division One North and Division One South. The split of clubs with ten to each division was similar to that of the previous season except Lordswood R were allocated to the North division and Ashford Town (Kent) R and Hastings Town R were allocated to the South division.

=== Division One Cup ===
The 2000–01 Kent Football League Division One Cup was contested by the 20 teams from Division One and won by Margate R who defeated Folkestone Invicta R in the final. The Margate Reserves previous cup triumph in the Kent League had been winning the Kent League Challenge Cup in 1969.
