= 2005–06 Kent Football League =

The 2005–06 Kent Football League season (known as the Kentish Observer League for sponsorship reasons) was the 40th in the history of Kent Football League a football competition in England.

The League structure comprised three divisions: a Premier Division together with Divisions One and Two – the latter two were known as the Reserves Section, comprising reserves teams which were not permitted in the Premier Division. Additionally there were two league cup competitions, the Challenge Cup for the Premier Division clubs and another for the teams in the two divisions of the Reserves Section.

== Premier Division ==
Kent Football League Premier Division
- Season: 2005–06
- Champions: Maidstone United
- Promoted: Maidstone United
- Matches: 240
- Goals: 786 (3.28 per match)

The league featured 16 clubs, 15 of which competed in the previous season together with one additional club:

- Erith & Belvedere, relegated from the Southern League

At the end of the season Maidstone United were promoted to the Isthmian League Division One South.

=== League table ===
Pos	Team	Pld	W	D	L	GF	GA	GD	Pts	Promotion
1	Maidstone United	30	22	6	2	85	23	+62	72	Promoted to the Isthmian League Division One South
2	Beckenham Town	30	22	4	4	96	24	+72	70	
3	Thamesmead Town	30	18	6	6	73	41	+32	60	
4	Erith & Belvedere	30	17	7	6	50	31	+19	58	
5	Whitstable Town	30	16	7	7	64	38	+26	55	
6	VCD Athletic	30	15	5	10	50	31	+19	50	
7	Herne Bay	30	14	7	9	52	33	+19	49	
8	Lordswood	30	12	9	9	49	45	+4	45	
9	Deal Town	30	13	4	13	53	62	−9	43	
10	Tunbridge Wells	30	10	7	13	39	41	−2	37	
11	Slade Green	30	9	7	14	31	56	−25	34	
12	Hythe Town	30	7	6	17	41	51	−10	27	
13	Greenwich Borough	30	7	3	20	36	69	−33	24	
14	Erith Town	30	5	5	20	22	64	−42	20	
15	Sporting Bengal United	30	3	6	21	27	107	−80	15	
16	Sevenoaks Town	30	3	5	22	18	70	−52	14	

Source: Kent League (archived)
Rules for classification: 1) points; 2) goal difference; 3) number of goals scored.

=== Results ===
Home \ Away	BEC	DEA	E&B	ERI	GRE	HER	HYT	LOR	MAI	SEV	SLA	SPB	THA	TUN	VCD	WHI
Beckenham Town		5–1	2–1	4–0	4–1	1–3	0–0	4–0	2–3	9–0	4–0	3–1	8–0	3–0	4–0	6–2
Deal Town	0–2		2–3	5–1	7–3	1–4	2–1	1–2	1–5	0–0	4–0	3–2	1–0	1–3	1–3	2–2
Erith & Belvedere	1–1	2–1		2–0	3–1	1–2	3–1	2–0	0–1	2–1	2–2	3–2	1–2	0–0	0–0	1–0
Erith Town	1–2	1–2	0–4		0–3	0–1	1–2	2–4	1–1	1–0	0–1	1–3	1–2	0–1	1–1	0–0
Greenwich Borough	0–7	2–0	0–1	1–1		1–2	2–1	0–0	0–2	1–0	0–2	1–2	4–3	0–2	0–1	3–5
Herne Bay	0–1	0–1	1–2	3–0	0–2		3–2	3–2	0–1	3–0	4–0	8–0	1–1	1–1	0–1	1–1
Hythe Town	1–2	1–1	1–1	3–3	3–1	0–3		1–0	2–2	1–0	1–2	4–0	1–3	2–3	0–1	0–2
Lordswood	0–5	2–0	2–2	6–0	3–2	1–1	2–2		0–5	4–0	0–0	7–0	0–3	1–0	1–2	3–2
Maidstone United	1–1	3–1	2–1	5–0	4–1	1–0	5–2	0–1		5–0	2–0	9–0	5–0	2–1	3–0	1–2
Sevenoaks Town	2–6	1–1	2–1	0–1	1–3	2–2	0–1	1–1	0–4		1–3	1–0	0–3	0–1	3–3	1–5
Slade Green	0–2	1–2	1–2	1–0	1–1	1–0	2–1	0–1	1–2	2–1		2–2	0–4	2–0	1–7	2–5
Sporting Bengal United	0–3	1–2	1–1	2–3	4–1	2–2	0–6	1–1	1–5	0–1	1–1		0–7	0–0	1–5	0–7
Thamesmead Town	2–1	6–1	2–3	2–1	3–2	6–0	3–0	1–1	1–1	2–0	1–1	5–0		2–0	1–0	0–0
Tunbridge Wells	2–2	3–4	1–2	0–1	3–0	0–2	2–1	1–1	2–3	2–0	1–1	5–1	2–3		0–1	2–1
VCD Athletic	0–2	1–2	0–1	0–1	2–0	0–1	1–0	1–2	1–1	1–0	3–0	7–0	2–2	3–0		1–3
Whitstable Town	2–0	2–3	0–2	3–0	2–0	1–1	1–0	3–1	1–1	2–0	2–1	3–0	4–3	1–1	0–2	

Source: Herne Bay F.C: Grid (archived) & Kentish Football (results) & Kent League: Results (archived) & Kent League: Table (archived)
Legend: Blue = home team win; Yellow = draw; Red = away team win.

=== Challenge Cup ===
The 2005–06 Kent Football League Challenge Cup was won by Maidstone United who completed the League and Cup double.

The competition was played by the 16 teams form the Premier Division One initially organised into four groups. The group winners and runners-up progressed into the quarter-finals, decided on a single match knockout basis with the group winners drawn at home. The semi-finals were decided on an aggregate basis (home and away matches), followed by a final match played on a neutral ground (at Folkestone Invicta F.C. this season).

==== Quarter-finals, Semi-finals and Final ====
Quarter-finals
Thamesmead Town	1
Hythe Town	2
Maidstone United	4 (Note: After extra time)
Beckenham Town	3
Lordswood	0
VCD Athletic	1
Herne Bay	2
Whitstable Town	1

Semi-finals
Hythe Town	1	1	2
Maidstone United	2	2	4
VCD Athletic	1	1	2
Herne Bay	1	0	1

Final
Maidstone United	4
VCD Athletic	0

Kentish Football

==== Group Stage ====
- Group A

Pos	Team	Pld	W	D	L	GF	GA	GD	Pts	
1	Herne Bay	6	4	1	1	12	3	+9	13	Progressed to Quarter-final (home)
2	Hythe Town	6	3	1	2	18	8	+10	10	Progressed to Quarter-final (away)
3	Erith & Belvedere	6	3	1	2	11	9	+2	10	
4	Sporting Bengal United	6	0	1	5	4	25	−21	1	

Source: Herne Bay Football Club (archived)
Rules for classification: 1) points; 2) goal difference; 3) number of goals scored.

Home \ Away	E&B	HER	HYT	SPB
Erith & Belvedere		2–0	2–4	5–0
Herne Bay	4–0		2–1	3–0
Hythe Town	0–1	0–0		7–1
Sporting Bengal United	1–1	0–3	2–6	

Source: Herne Bay Football Club (archived)
Legend: Blue = home team win; Yellow = draw; Red = away team win.
- Group B

Pos	Team	Pld	W	D	L	GF	GA	GD	Pts	
1	Lordswood	6	4	1	1	12	10	+2	13	Progressed to Quarter-final (home)
2	Whitstable Town	6	3	2	1	11	7	+4	11	Progressed to Quarter-final (away)
3	Erith Town	6	2	0	4	7	8	−1	6	
4	Greenwich Borough	6	1	1	4	7	12	−5	4	

Source: Herne Bay Football Club (archived)
Rules for classification: 1) points; 2) goal difference; 3) number of goals scored.

Home \ Away	ERI	GRE	LOR	WHI
Erith Town		3–0	1–2	2–0
Greenwich Borough	2–1		1–2	0–1
Lordswood	2–0	3–2		3–3
Whitstable Town	2–0	2–2	3–0	

Source: Herne Bay Football Club (archived)
Legend: Blue = home team win; Yellow = draw; Red = away team win.
- Group C

Pos	Team	Pld	W	D	L	GF	GA	GD	Pts	
1	Maidstone United	6	5	0	1	16	6	+10	15	Progressed to Quarter-final (home)
2	VCD Athletic	6	3	2	1	9	7	+2	11	Progressed to Quarter-final (away)
3	Tunbridge Wells	6	2	2	2	8	8	0	8	
4	Deal Town	6	0	0	6	7	19	−12	0	

Source: Herne Bay Football Club (archived)
Rules for classification: 1) points; 2) goal difference; 3) number of goals scored.

Home \ Away	DEA	MAI	TUN	VCD
Deal Town		1–3	0–2	3–4
Maidstone United	5–1		3–2	0–2
Tunbridge Wells	3–1	0–3		0–0
VCD Athletic	2–1	0–2	1–1	

Source: Herne Bay Football Club (archived)
Legend: Blue = home team win; Yellow = draw; Red = away team win.
- Group D

Pos	Team	Pld	W	D	L	GF	GA	GD	Pts	
1	Thamesmead Town	6	3	3	0	11	5	+6	12	Progressed to Quarter-final (home)
2	Beckenham Town	6	2	4	0	11	5	+6	10	Progressed to Quarter-final (away)
3	Slade Green	6	2	2	2	8	7	+1	8	
4	Sevenoaks Town	6	0	1	5	2	15	−13	1	

Source: Herne Bay Football Club (archived)
Rules for classification: 1) points; 2) goal difference; 3) number of goals scored.

Home \ Away	BEC	SEV	SLA	THA
Beckenham Town		2–0	0–0	3–3
Sevenoaks Town	0–4		0–1	0–1
Slade Green	1–1	6–1		0–2
Thamesmead Town	1–1	1–1	3–0	

Source: Herne Bay Football Club (archived)
Legend: Blue = home team win; Yellow = draw; Red = away team win.

== Reserves Section ==
The letter "R" following team names indicates a club's reserves team.

The 2005–06 Reserves Section comprised two divisions, with promotion and relegation possible between the divisions. Promotion from the Reserves Section into the Premier Division was not permitted. There was a single League Cup competition for all teams in the section.

=== Division One ===
Kent Football League Division One
- Season: 2005–06
- Champions: Thamesmead Town R
- Matches: 132
- Goals: 473 (3.58 per match)

The division featured twelve clubs, ten of which competed in the previous season together with Whitstable Town R and Bromley R who had both been promoted from Division Two.

At the end of the season Deal Town R and Herne Bay R were relegated to Division Two.

==== League table ====
Pos	Team	Pld	W	D	L	GF	GA	GD	Pts	Season End Notes
1	Thamesmead Town R	22	15	5	2	50	23	+27	50	
2	Whitstable Town R	22	13	3	6	46	32	+14	42	
3	Cray Wanderers R	22	11	5	6	51	34	+17	38	
4	Bromley R	22	12	2	8	42	34	+8	38	
5	Dartford R	22	10	5	7	39	27	+12	35	
6	Erith Town R	22	10	4	8	50	42	+8	34	
7	Ramsgate R	22	8	6	8	38	45	−7	30	
8	Ashford Town (Kent) R	22	8	4	10	38	47	−9	28	
9	Erith & Belvedere R	22	7	6	9	43	47	−4	27	
10	Maidstone United R	22	6	4	12	31	53	−22	22	
11	Herne Bay R	22	3	5	14	25	46	−21	14	Relegated to Division Two
12	Deal Town R	22	3	3	16	20	43	−23	12	Relegated to Division Two

Source: Kent League (archived), table & Kent League (archived), final match result
Rules for classification: 1) points; 2) goal difference; 3) number of goals scored.

=== Division Two ===
Kent Football League Division Two
- Season: 2005–06
- Champions: Folkestone Invicta R
- Matches: 110
- Goals: 379 (3.45 per match)

The division featured eleven clubs, nine of which competed in the previous season together with two additional clubs:

- Greenwich Borough R rejoining the league after an absence of three seasons.
- Tilbury R

At the end of the season Folkestone Invicta R and Sevenoaks Town R were promoted to Division One and Slade Green R left the League.

==== League table ====
Pos	Team	Pld	W	D	L	GF	GA	GD	Pts	Season End Notes
1	Folkestone Invicta R	20	14	4	2	53	16	+37	46	Promoted to Division One
2	Sevenoaks Town R	20	11	4	5	32	22	+10	37	Promoted to Division One
3	Chatham Town R	20	11	1	8	47	42	+5	34	
4	Slade Green R	20	9	6	5	36	22	+14	33	Resigned from the League
5	Tunbridge Wells R	20	8	7	5	42	34	+8	31	
6	Lordswood R	20	8	4	8	42	39	+3	28	
7	Greenwich Borough R (Note: Greenwich R v Hythe Town R match awarded to Greenwich R)	20	6	5	9	26	37	−11	23	
8	VCD Athletic R	20	6	4	10	27	46	−19	22	
9	Tilbury R	20	5	5	10	26	33	−7	20	
10	Sittingbourne R	20	4	5	11	24	42	−18	17	
11	Hythe Town R	20	3	5	12	24	46	−22	14	

Source: Kent League (archived), table & Kent League (archived), final match result
Rules for classification: 1) points; 2) goal difference; 3) number of goals scored.

=== Reserves Cup ===
The 2005–06 Kent Football League Reserves Cup was won by Dartford R.

The competition was contested by all 23 teams of the Reserves Section over a total of five rounds: the first three were single match knock-out rounds, followed by the semi-finals on an aggregate basis (home and away matches) and then the final match played on a neutral ground (at Folkestone Invicta F.C. this season)

==== Quarter-finals, Semi-finals and Final ====
Quarter-finals
Dartford R	3
VCD Athletic R	0
Ashford Town (Kent) R	4 (Note: After extra time)
Tunbridge Wells R	3
Whitstable Town R	2
Hythe Town R	1
Thamesmead Town R	0
Folkestone Invicta R	3

Semi-finals
Dartford R	5	?	?
Ashford Town (Kent) R	0	?	?
Whitstable Town R	5	1	6
Folkestone Invicta R	1	1	2

Final
Dartford R	3
Whitstable Town R	1

==== Second Round ====
- Dartford R 2 – 2 Erith & Belvedere R
- Replay: Erith & Belvedere R 1 – 2 Dartford R
- Greenwich Borough R 1 – 4 VCD Athletic R
- Ashford Town (Kent) R 7 – 1 Sittingbourne R
- Chatham Town R 2 – 3 Tunbridge Wells R
- Lordswood R 1 – 1 Whitstable Town R
- Replay: Whitstable Town R 4 – 0 Lordswood R
- Hythe Town R 1 – 1 (aet) Ramsgate R (Hythe Town R won 5–4 on penalties)
- Cray Wanderers R 0 – 3 Thamesmead Town R
- Deal Town R 1 – 3 Folkestone Invicta R

==== First Round ====
- Maidstone United R 1 – 3 Erith & Belvedere R
- Bromley R 2 – 2 (aet) VCD Athletic R (VCD Athletic R won 4–2 on penalties)
- Erith Town R 3 – 3 (aet) Ashford Town (Kent) R (Ashford Town (Kent) R won 5–4 on penalties)
- Tunbridge Wells R 6 – 1 Sevenoaks Town R
- Slade Green R 1 – 4 Whitstable Town R
- Tilbury R 1 – 1 (aet) Hythe Town R (Hythe Town R won 4–3 on penalties)
- Cray Wanderers R 3 – 1 Herne Bay R

Byes for the remaining nine teams

Source: Kent League (archived) & Kentish Football
