= 1998–99 Kent Football League =

The 1998–99 Kent Football League season (known as the Winstonlead Kent League for sponsorship reasons) was the 33rd in the history of Kent Football League a football competition in England.

The League structure comprised two divisions: a Premier Division together with a Reserves Section league, Division One. The two divisions had been renamed respectively from Division One and Division Two of the previous season. Reserves teams were not permitted in the Premier Division. Additionally there were two league cup competitions: the Challenge Cup for the Premier Division clubs and another for the teams in the Reserves Section.

From this season onwards the grounds where Premier Division matches were played were required to have floodlights.

== Premier Division ==
Kent Football League Premier Division
- Season: 1998–99
- Champions: Ramsgate
- Matches: 342
- Goals: 1,021 (2.99 per match)

The league featured 19 clubs which had competed in the previous season, no additional clubs joined the league this season.

The league was won by Ramsgate for the second season in succession.

At the end of the season Crockenhill resigned and joined the Kent County League.

=== League table ===
Pos	Team	Pld	W	D	L	GF	GA	GD	Pts	Season End Notes
1	Ramsgate	36	26	5	5	93	24	+69	83	
2	Deal Town	36	24	9	3	78	24	+54	81	
3	Greenwich Borough	36	24	4	8	64	28	+36	76	
4	Thamesmead Town	36	20	14	2	57	19	+38	74	
5	Crockenhill	36	19	10	7	62	38	+24	66 (Note: Crockenhill were deducted one point.)	Resigned to the Kent County League
6	Chatham Town	36	18	11	7	61	40	+21	65	
7	VCD Athletic	36	16	9	11	61	51	+10	57	
8	Whitstable Town	36	15	9	12	60	52	+8	54	
9	Beckenham Town	36	13	11	12	51	47	+4	50	
10	Slade Green	36	11	11	14	58	49	+9	44	
11	Sheppey United	36	11	8	17	50	59	−9	44 (Note: Sheppey United were awarded three points for match of 26 September 1998 lost 1–2 versus Faversham Town, who fielded an ineligible player.)	
12	Herne Bay	36	9	9	18	34	51	−17	36	
13	Lordswood	36	8	12	16	47	71	−24	36	
14	Cray Wanderers	36	8	9	19	53	66	−13	35 (Note: Cray Wanderers were awarded two points.)	
15	Canterbury City	36	9	8	19	34	73	−39	35	
16	Faversham Town	36	9	5	22	41	80	−39	29 (Note: Faversham Town were deducted the three points gained from match of 26 September 1998 won 2–1 versus Sheppey United, for fielding an ineligible player.)	
17	Erith Town	36	8	5	23	33	79	−46	29	
18	Hythe United	36	7	7	22	38	65	−27	28	
19	Tunbridge Wells	36	5	8	23	46	105	−59	23	

Source: "League Tables Update: Winstonlead Kent League: Final Table: Premier Division". Tunbridge Wells Courier. 28 May 1999. p. 91 – via British Newspaper Archive.
Rules for classification: 1) points; 2) goal difference; 3) number of goals scored.

=== Challenge Cup ===
The 1998–99 Kent Football League Challenge Cup was won by Deal Town.

The competition was contested by the 19 teams from the Premier Division over five rounds: the first three were a single match knock-out followed by the semis-finals on an aggregate basis (home and away matches) and the final match played on a neutral ground (at Folkestone Invicta F.C. this season).

==== Quarter-finals, Semi-finals and Final ====
Quarter-finals
Chatham Town	0
Deal Town	2
Cray Wanderers	0
Ramsgate	1
Herne Bay	1
VCD Athletic	4
Crockenhill	2
Hythe United	0

Semi-finals
Deal Town	1	2	3
Ramsgate	0	2	2
VCD Athletic	0	1	1 (Note: VCD Athletic won on away goal)
Crockenhill	0	1	1

Final
Deal Town	1
VCD Athletic	0

Sources:

- Quarter-finals: "Senior Soccer details: Results: Saturday: Winstonlead Kent League, Premier Division Cup, third round". Kent Messenger. 29 January 1999. p. 79 – via British Newspaper Archive.; "Senior Soccer details: Results: Wednesday: Winstonlead Kent League, Premier Division Cup". Kent Messenger. 29 January 1999. p. 79 – via British Newspaper Archive.
- Semi-finals: "Football Results And Fixtures Service: Results: Saturday, March 20: Winstonlead Kent League: Premier Division Cup; Semi-Finals, First Leg". Dover Express. 25 March 1999. p. 79 – via British Newspaper Archive.; "Football Results And Fixtures Service: Results: Saturday, March 27: Winstonlead Kent League: Premier Division Cup; Semi-Finals, Second Leg". Dover Express. 1 April 1999. p. 79 – via British Newspaper Archive.
- Final: "Football Results And Fixtures Service: Results: Saturday, May 1: Winstonlead Kent League: Premier Division Cup Final". Dover Express. 6 May 1999. p. 67 – via British Newspaper Archive.

==== Second Round ====
- Chatham Town 2 – 0 Slade Green
- Beckenham Town 2 – 3 Deal Town
- Cray Wanderers 1 – 0 Lordswood
- Whitstable Town 0 – 2 Ramsgate
- Herne Bay 1 – 0 Tunbridge Wells
- Canterbury City 1 – 3 VCD Athletic
- Erith Town 0 – 2 Crockenhill
- Faversham Town 2 – 2 Hythe United (match abandoned after 84 minutes owing to floodlight failure)
- REPLAY: Hythe United 3 – 1 Faversham Town

==== First Round ====
- Chatham Town 4 – 1 Greenwich Borough
- Sheppey United 0 – 3 Deal Town
- Thamesmead Town 0 – 2 Crockenhill
- Byes for the other 13 teams

Sources:

- Second Round: "Weekend Results And Tables: Winstonlead Kent League: Premier Division Cup, second round". Kent Times. 23 November 1998. p. 18 – via British Newspaper Archive.; "Soccer Details: Last Night's Results: Winstonlead Kent League: Premier Division Cup, second round replay". Kent Times. 9 December 1998. p. 31 – via British Newspaper Archive.
- First Round: "Soccer Details: Last Night's Results: Winstonlead Kent League: Premier Division Cup". Kent Times. 28 October 1998. p. 31 – via British Newspaper Archive.

== Reserves Section ==
The letter "R" following team names indicates a club's reserves team.

The 1998–99 Reserves Section comprised a single division. The promotion of reserves teams into the Premier Division was not permitted. There was a single League Cup competition for the teams in the section.

=== Division One ===
Kent Football League Division One
- Season: 1998–99
- Champions: Deal Town R
- Matches: 342
- Goals: 1,239 (3.62 per match)

The division featured teams from 19 clubs, 16 of which were from the previous season together with three additional teams

- Swanley Furness who had dropped from the top division and replaced their reserves team.
- Canterbury City R
- Cray Wanderers R

The division was won by Deal Town R.

At the end of the season Crockenhill R resigned from the league and the remainder of the teams were allocated to two new equally ranked, geographically based divisions, Division One North and Division One South.

==== League table ====
Pos	Team	Pld	W	D	L	GF	GA	GD	Pts	Season End Notes
1	Deal Town R	36	28	6	2	114	25	+89	90	Moved to Division One South
2	Dover Athletic R	36	28	2	6	109	33	+76	86	Moved to Division One South
3	Margate R	36	23	11	2	85	25	+60	82 (Note: Margate R were awarded two points)	Moved to Division One South
4	Swanley Furness	36	20	4	12	69	46	+23	67 (Note: Swanley Furness were awarded three points)	Moved to Division One North
5	Thamesmead Town R	36	18	9	9	91	65	+26	65 (Note: Thamesmead Town R were awarded two points)	Moved to Division One North
6	Folkestone Invicta R	36	19	7	10	98	70	+28	64	Moved to Division One South
7	Ramsgate R	36	17	10	9	74	62	+12	61	Moved to Division One South
8	Hastings Town R	36	15	9	12	54	67	−13	54	Moved to Division One North
9	Lordswood R	36	15	6	15	67	69	−2	51	Moved to Division One South
10	Dartford R	36	14	7	15	60	64	−4	49	Moved to Division One North
11	Sittingbourne R	36	13	10	13	57	57	0	46 (Note: Sittingbourne R were deducted three points)	Moved to Division One South
12	Chatham Town R	36	13	4	19	57	79	−22	43	Moved to Division One North
13	Beckenham Town R	36	11	8	17	46	49	−3	39 (Note: Beckenham Town R were deducted two points)	Moved to Division One North
14	Herne Bay R	36	10	7	19	54	75	−21	37	Moved to Division One South
15	Canterbury City R	36	11	4	21	42	91	−49	37	Moved to Division One South
16	Cray Wanderers R	36	8	6	22	46	83	−37	30	Moved to Division One North
17	Hythe United R	36	7	3	26	39	99	−60	24	Moved to Division One South
18	Crockenhill R	36	4	10	22	45	94	−49	22	Resigned
19	Whitstable Town R	36	5	3	28	32	86	−54	18	Moved to Division One South

Source: "The Winstonlead Kent League: Division One". Folkestone Herald. 20 May 1999. p. 71 – via British Newspaper Archive.
Rules for classification: 1) points; 2) goal difference; 3) number of goals scored.

=== Division One Cup ===
The 1998–99 Kent Football League Division One Cup was won by Dover Athletic R.

The competition for the 19 teams from the Division One comprised five rounds: the first three were a single match knock-out followed by the semis-finals on an aggregate basis (home and away matches) and a single match final. Although the final was scheduled to be at Herne Bay F.C. it was agreed to move it to the home ground of one of the two competing clubs - Dover Athletic won the coin toss.

==== Quarter-finals, Semi-finals and Final ====
Quarter-finals
Swanley Furness	4 (Note: After extra time)	3 (Note: Replay)
Whitstable Town R	4	1
Sittingbourne R	0 (Note: After extra time)	0 (Note: Replay, after extra time)	2p (Note: Penalty shoot-out)
Dover Athletic R	0	0	3p
Hythe United R	0
Deal Town R	10
Folkestone Invicta R	2
Dartford R	3

Semi-finals
Swanley Furness	0	1	1
Dover Athletic R	0	3	3
Deal Town R	3	0	3
Dartford R	2	0	2

Final
Dover Athletic R	2
Deal Town R	0

Sources:

- Quarter-finals: "Senior soccer details: Results: Saturday: Winstonlead Kent League: Division 1 Cup, third round". Kent Messenger. 22 January 1999. p. 79 – via British Newspaper Archive.; "Senior soccer details: Results: Saturday: Winstonlead Kent League: Division 1 Cup, third round". Kent Messenger. 29 January 1999. p. 79 – via British Newspaper Archive.; "Senior soccer details: Results: Wednesday: Winstonlead Kent League: Division 1 Cup, third round replay". Kent Messenger. 29 January 1999. p. 79 – via British Newspaper Archive.; "Senior soccer details: Results: Wednesday: Winstonlead Kent League: Division 1 Cup, third round & Third round replay". Kent Messenger. 5 February 1999. p. 79 – via British Newspaper Archive.
- Semi-finals: "Football Results And Fixtures Service: Results: Saturday, March 13: Winstonlead Kent League: Division One Cup, Semi-Finals, First Leg". Dover Express. 18 March 1999. p. 71 – via British Newspaper Archive.; "Football Results And Fixtures Service: Results: Saturday, March 20: Winstonlead Kent League: Division One Cup, Semi-Finals, Second Leg". Dover Express. 25 March 1999. p. 79 – via British Newspaper Archive.
- Final: "Football Results And Fixtures Service: Results: Saturday, April 10: Winstonlead Kent League: Division One Cup Final". Dover Express. 15 April 1999. p. 71 – via British Newspaper Archive.

==== Second Round ====
- Swanley Furness 4 – 3 Chatham Town R
- Whitstable Town R 3 – 3 Lordswood R (score at 90 minutes: 3–3)
- REPLAY: Lordswood R 0 – 2 Whitstable Town R
- Ramsgate R 1 – 1 (aet) Sittingbourne R (score at 90 minutes: 1–1)
- REPLAY: Sittingbourne R 1 – 0 Ramsgate R
- Cray Wanderers R 1 – 1 (aet) Dover Athletic R (score at 90 minutes: 0–0)
- REPLAY: Dover Athletic R 2 – 1 Cray Wanderers R
- Canterbury City R 2 – 5 Hythe United R
- Crockenhill R 0 – 1 Deal Town R
- Hastings Town R 2 – 5 Folkestone Invicta R
- Thamesmead Town R 1 – 2 Dartford R

==== First Round ====
- Herne Bay R 0 – 1 Cray Wanderers R
- Margate R 1 – 2 Hythe United R
- Dartford R 3 – 2 Beckenham Town R
- Byes for the other 13 teams

Sources:

- Second Round: "Weekend Results And Tables: Winstonlead Kent League: Division 1 Cup, second round". Kent Times. 23 November 1998. p. 18 – via British Newspaper Archive.; "Weekend Results: Kent League: Division 1 Cup, second round". Kent Times. 30 November 1998. p. 18 – via British Newspaper Archive.; "Soccer Details: Last Night's Results: Winstonlead Kent League: Division 1 Cup, second round replay". Kent Times. 2 December 1998. p. 31 – via British Newspaper Archive.; "Soccer Details: Last Night's Results: Winstonlead Kent League: Division 1 Cup, second round replay". Kent Times. 3 December 1998. p. 39 – via British Newspaper Archive.; "Weekend Results: Winstonlead Kent League: Division 1 Cup 2nd round". Kent Times. 7 December 1998. p. 35 – via British Newspaper Archive.; "Soccer Details: Last Night's Results: Winstonlead Kent League: Division 1 Cup (second round replay)". Kent Times. 16 December 1998. p. 31 – via British Newspaper Archive.
- First Round: "All The Weekend Soccer Details: Winstonlead Kent League: Division 1 Cup, 1st Round". Kent Times. 19 October 1998. p. 20 – via British Newspaper Archive.; "Weekend Results And Tables: Winstonlead Kent League: Division 1 Cup, first round". Kent Times. 26 October 1998. p. 18 – via British Newspaper Archive.; "Weekend Results: Winstonlead Kent League: Division 1 Cup, First round". Kent Times. 9 November 1998. p. 18 – via British Newspaper Archive.
