= 1999–2000 Kent Football League =

The 1999–2000 Kent Football League season (newly known as the Bass Brewers Kent League for sponsorship reasons) was the 34th in the history of Kent Football League a football competition in England.

The League structure comprised three divisions: a Premier Division together with a Reserves Section comprising two newly formed equal status geographically based divisions: Division One North and Division One South. Reserves teams were not permitted in the Premier Division. Additionally there were two league cup competitions: the Challenge Cup for the Premier Division clubs and another for the teams in the Reserves Section.

== Premier Division ==
Kent Football League Premier Division
- Season: 1999–2000
- Champions: Deal Town
- Matches: 306
- Goals: 975 (3.19 per match)

The league featured 18 clubs which competed in the previous season, no new clubs joined the league this season.

The league was won by Deal Town, the first occasion they were champions of the reformed Kent Football League.

=== League table ===
Pos	Team	Pld	W	D	L	GF	GA	GD	Pts
1	Deal Town	34	26	5	3	87	28	+59	83
2	Thamesmead Town	34	23	6	5	75	29	+46	72 (Note: Thamesmead Town were deducted three points.)
3	Chatham Town	34	23	3	8	76	40	+36	72
4	VCD Athletic	34	18	10	6	53	32	+21	64
5	Ramsgate	34	18	9	7	75	41	+34	63
6	Greenwich Borough	34	17	5	12	70	44	+26	56
7	Erith Town	34	16	8	10	56	54	+2	56
8	Hythe United	34	14	6	14	38	50	−12	48
9	Sheppey United	34	12	6	16	45	60	−15	45 (Note: Sheppey United were awarded three points.)
10	Beckenham Town	34	12	8	14	45	51	−6	44
11	Lordswood	34	12	6	16	55	63	−8	42
12	Herne Bay	34	12	8	14	56	48	+8	41 (Note: Herne Bay were deducted three points.)
13	Cray Wanderers	34	10	3	21	42	80	−38	36 (Note: Cray Wanderers were awarded three points.)
14	Tunbridge Wells	34	9	6	19	49	72	−23	33
15	Slade Green	34	8	6	20	41	65	−24	30
16	Whitstable Town	34	6	9	19	38	56	−18	27
17	Faversham Town	34	6	6	22	39	70	−31	24
18	Canterbury City	34	6	6	22	35	92	−57	24

Source: FCHD
Rules for classification: 1) points; 2) goal difference; 3) number of goals scored.

=== Challenge Cup ===
The 1999–2000 Kent Football League Challenge Cup was won for the first time in their history by VCD Athletic.

Deal Town reached the final but owing to fixture congestion from their extended run to the FA Vase Final they withdrew (with Faversham Town, who they had defeated in their semi-final tie, taking their place).

The competition was contested by the 18 teams from the Premier Division over five rounds: the first three were a single match knock-out followed by the semis-finals on an aggregate basis (home and away matches) and the final match played on a neutral ground.

==== Final ====
- Faversham Town 0 – 4 VCD Athletic

==== Semi-finals ====
- Faversham Town v Deal Town
- VCD Athletic v Ramsgate

==== Quarter-finals ====
Quarter-final draw:

- Chatham Town v VCD Athletic
- Erith Town v Ramsgate
- Slade Green v Faversham Town
- Whitstable Town v Deal Town

==== Second Round ====
- Cray Wanderers 0 – 3 Deal Town
- Canterbury City x – W Slade Green (tie awarded to Slade Green as Canterbury City failed to fulfill fixture)
- Faversham Town 2 – 0 Herne Bay
- Thamesmead Town 1 – 2 Whitstable Town R
- Sheppey United 1 – 2 Chatham Town
- Lordswood 1 – 1 (aet) VCD Athletic (score at 90 minutes 1–1)
- REPLAY: VCD Athletic v Lordswood
- Beckenham Town 0 – 1 Erith Town
- Ramsgate 5 – 0 Tunbridge Wells

==== First Round ====
- Whitstable Town 4 – 1 Greenwich Borough
- Hythe United 0 – 1 Cray Wanderers
- Byes for the other 14 teams

== Reserves Section ==
The letter "R" following team names indicates a club's reserves team.

The 1999–2000 Reserves Section comprised two equal ranked geographically based divisions, Division One North and Division One South which had been formed from the single division of the previous season. The top club in each division played a single match to decide the Division One Champion. The promotion of reserves teams into the Premier Division was not permitted. There was a single League Cup competition for the teams in the section.

=== Division One Champion Play-off ===
Thamesmead Town R were the Division One champions, winning the single play-off match between the top team from each of the Division One North and Division One South:

- Thamesmead Town R defeated Deal Town R

=== Division One North ===
Kent Football League Division One North
- Season: 1999–2000
- Champions: Thamesmead Town R

The division featured eleven clubs, of which seven were from the previous seasons Division One:

- Beckenham Town R
- Chatham Town R
- Cray Wanderers R
- Dartford R
- Hastings Town R
- Swanley Furness
- Thamesmead Town R

and four were additional clubs:

- Ashford Town R
- Erith Town R
- Greenwich Borough R
- VCD Athletic R

At the end of the season all the clubs from Division One North were combined with clubs from Division One South in the formation of a single Division One for the following season.

=== Division One South ===
Kent Football League Division One South
- Season: 1999–2000
- Champions: Deal Town R
- Matches: 90
- Goals: 317 (3.52 per match)

The division began with eleven clubs who had all been part of the previous seasons Division One.

During the season Canterbury City R resigned and their record was expunged.

At the end of the season champions Deal Town R resigned from the league and the remaining clubs from the division were combined with clubs from Division One North in the formation of a single Division One for the following season.

==== League table ====
Pos	Team	Pld	W	D	L	GF	GA	GD	Pts	Season End Notes
1	Deal Town R	18	14	3	1	54	20	+34	45	Resigned
2	Dover Athletic R	18	12	3	3	37	16	+21	39	Moved to Division One
3	Margate R	18	10	4	4	35	20	+15	34	Moved to Division One
4	Ramsgate R	18	9	5	4	27	15	+12	32	Moved to Division One
5	Sittingbourne R	18	7	3	8	27	34	−7	24	Moved to Division One
6	Whitstable Town R	18	6	4	8	44	36	+8	22	Moved to Division One
7	Lordswood R	18	6	4	8	21	25	−4	22	Moved to Division One
8	Folkestone Invicta R	18	5	4	9	36	34	+2	19	Moved to Division One
9	Herne Bay R	18	2	3	13	19	49	−30	9	Moved to Division One
10	Hythe United R	18	2	1	15	17	68	−51	7	Moved to Division One
11	Canterbury City R	0	0	0	0	0	0	0	0	Resigned, record expunged

Source: Dover Athletic FC (Official Website): Reserves: Season 1999/2000: Bass Brewers Kent Football League Division One (South) (archived)
Rules for classification: 1) points; 2) goal difference; 3) number of goals scored.

=== Division One Cup ===
The 1999–2000 Kent Football League Division One Cup was won by Thamesmead Town R to complete a League and Cup double.

The competition for the 22 teams from the Reserves Section comprised a group phase (with four sections) with the group winners progressing to home and away aggregate semi-finals to produce the two finalists.

==== Final ====
Thamesmead Town R defeated Deal Town R

==== Group Phase ====
Group A

- Swanley Furness
- Greenwich Borough R
- Hastings Town R
- Lordswood R
- Ramsgate R
- Dartford R

Group B

- Canterbury City R
- Chatham Town R
- Erith Town R
- Herne Bay R
- Margate R
- VCD Athletic R

Group C

Pos	Team	Pld	W	D	L	GF	GA	GD	Pts	Group Notes
1	Thamesmead Town R	8	5	2	1	10	6	+4	17	Qualified for semi-final
2	Sittingbourne R	8	4	0	4	15	13	+2	12	
3	Dover Athletic R	8	3	2	3	9	8	+1	11	
4	Cray Wanderers R	8	3	0	5	11	11	0	9	
5	Whitstable Town R	8	2	2	4	6	13	−7	8	

Source: Dover Athletic FC (Official Website): Reserves: Season 1999/2000: Bass Brewers Kent Football League Division One Cup Group C Table (archived)
Rules for classification: 1) points; 2) goal difference; 3) number of goals scored.

Group D

- Deal Town R
- Ashford Town (Kent) R
- Beckenham Town R
- Folkestone Invicta R
- Hythe United R
