= 2001–02 Kent Football League =

The 2001–02 Kent Football League season (known as the Bass Brewers Kent League for sponsorship reasons) was the 36th in the history of the Kent Football League a football competition in England.

The League structure comprised three divisions: a Premier Division and a Reserves Section comprising two equally ranked geographically based divisions known as Division One North and Division One South – with a play-off between the winners of these two divisions to decide the Division One champion. Reserve teams were not permitted in the Premier Division. Additionally, there were two league cup competitions: the Challenge Cup for the Premier Division clubs and another for the teams in the Reserves Section.

== Premier Division ==
Kent Football League Premier Division
- Season: 2001–02
- Champions: Maidstone United
- Matches: 240
- Goals: 787 (3.28 per match)

The league featured 16 clubs, 15 of which competed in the previous season, along with one additional club:

- Maidstone United, joined from the Kent County League

Also, Hythe United changed its name to Hythe Town.

=== League table ===
| Pos | Team | Pld | W | D | L | GF | GA | GD | Pts |
|---|---|---|---|---|---|---|---|---|---|
| 1 | Maidstone United | 30 | 20 | 6 | 4 | 72 | 32 | +40 | 66 |
| 2 | VCD Athletic | 30 | 20 | 6 | 4 | 67 | 31 | +36 | 66 |
| 3 | Deal Town | 30 | 19 | 5 | 6 | 79 | 38 | +41 | 62 |
| 4 | Thamesmead Town | 30 | 17 | 6 | 7 | 59 | 39 | +20 | 57 |
| 5 | Cray Wanderers | 30 | 15 | 6 | 9 | 56 | 44 | +12 | 51 |
| 6 | Ramsgate | 30 | 13 | 5 | 12 | 57 | 50 | +7 | 44 |
| 7 | Herne Bay | 30 | 13 | 5 | 12 | 53 | 49 | +4 | 41 (Note: Herne Bay were deducted three points.) |
| 8 | Tunbridge Wells | 30 | 10 | 10 | 10 | 45 | 46 | −1 | 40 |
| 9 | Beckenham Town | 30 | 11 | 7 | 12 | 43 | 45 | −2 | 40 |
| 10 | Whitstable Town | 30 | 9 | 9 | 12 | 43 | 51 | −8 | 36 |
| 11 | Lordswood | 30 | 8 | 9 | 13 | 44 | 55 | −11 | 36 (Note: Lordswood were awarded three points.) |
| 12 | Slade Green | 30 | 11 | 2 | 17 | 35 | 47 | −12 | 35 |
| 13 | Erith Town | 30 | 10 | 3 | 17 | 42 | 60 | −18 | 33 |
| 14 | Hythe Town | 30 | 8 | 7 | 15 | 31 | 49 | −18 | 31 |
| 15 | Greenwich Borough | 30 | 5 | 4 | 21 | 31 | 70 | −39 | 19 |
| 16 | Faversham Town | 30 | 3 | 6 | 21 | 30 | 81 | −51 | 15 |

Source: FCHD
Rules for classification: 1) points; 2) goal difference; 3) number of goals scored.

=== Challenge Cup ===
The 2001–02 Kent Football League Challenge Cup was won by Maidstone United, which completed the League and Cup double.

The competition was contested by the 16 teams from the Premier Division over four rounds: the first two were a single-match knockout, followed by the semi-finals on an aggregate basis (home and away matches), and the final match played on a neutral ground (at Folkestone Invicta F.C. this season).

==== Quarter-finals, Semi-finals and Final ====
Quarter-finals
Whitstable Town | 3
Greenwich Borough | 0
Cray Wanderers | 2
Hythe Town | 1
Lordswood | 0
VCD Athletic | 4
Beckenham Town | 0
Maidstone United | 1

Semi-finals
Whitstable Town | 2 | 0 | 2
Cray Wanderers | 1 | 0 | 1
VCD Athletic | 0 | 2 | 2
Maidstone United | 1 | 4 | 5

Final
Whitstable Town | 0
Maidstone United | 2

==== First Round ====
- Herne Bay 1 – 2 Whitstable Town
- Slade Green 2 – 2 (aet) Greenwich Borough
- REPLAY: Greenwich Borough v Slade Green
- Cray Wanderers 1 – 0 Ramsgate
- Erith Town 2 – 3 (aet) Hythe Town (score at 90 mins: 2–2)
- Lordswood 3 – 2 Tunbridge Wells
- Faversham Town v VCD Athletic
- Deal Town 3 – 4 Beckenham Town
- Thamesmead Town 0 – 1 Maidstone United

Sources: Non-League Football in Kent: Premier Division Cup (archived)

== Reserves Section ==
The letter "R" following team names indicates a club's reserves team.

The 2001–02 Reserves Section comprised two equal-ranked geographically based divisions, Division One North and Division One South, which had been formed from the single division of the previous season. The top club in each division played a single match to decide the Division One Champion. Promotion from the Reserves Section into the Premier Division was not permitted. There was a single League Cup competition for the teams in the section.

=== Division One Champion Play-off ===
Dover Athletic R were the Division One champions. They won the single play-off match, played at Ashford Town (Kent) F.C. between the top team from each of the Division One North and Division One South:

- Dartford R 1 – 3 (aet) Dover Athletic R, score at 90 mins 1–1.

=== Division One North ===
Kent Football League Division One North
- Season: 2001–02
- Champions: Cray Wanderers R
- Matches: 110
- Goals: 419 (3.81 per match)

The division featured 11 clubs, 10 of which had competed in the single Division One from the previous season, together with one additional club:

- Chatham Town R

At the end of the season, Greenwich Borough R resigned from the league.

==== League table ====
| Pos | Team | Pld | W | D | L | GF | GA | GD | Pts | Season End Notes |
|---|---|---|---|---|---|---|---|---|---|---|
| 1 | Dartford R | 20 | 13 | 4 | 3 | 51 | 26 | +25 | 43 | |
| 2 | Cray Wanderers R | 20 | 14 | 3 | 3 | 46 | 22 | +24 | 42 (Note: Cray Wanderers R were deducted three points) | |
| 3 | VCD Athletic R | 20 | 12 | 5 | 3 | 50 | 29 | +21 | 41 | |
| 4 | Chatham Town R | 20 | 10 | 3 | 7 | 33 | 28 | +5 | 33 | |
| 5 | Thamesmead Town R | 20 | 10 | 3 | 7 | 40 | 36 | +4 | 33 | |
| 6 | Swanley Furness | 20 | 8 | 3 | 9 | 45 | 40 | +5 | 27 | |
| 7 | Erith Town R | 20 | 7 | 4 | 9 | 38 | 45 | −7 | 25 | |
| 8 | Beckenham Town R | 20 | 6 | 3 | 11 | 26 | 35 | −9 | 24 (Note: Beckenham Town R were awarded three points) | |
| 9 | Tunbridge Wells R | 20 | 6 | 2 | 12 | 35 | 45 | −10 | 20 | |
| 10 | Lordswood R | 20 | 3 | 5 | 12 | 32 | 46 | −14 | 14 | |
| 11 | Greenwich Borough R | 20 | 3 | 1 | 16 | 23 | 67 | −44 | 10 | Resigned from the league |

Source: Dartford FC Reserves Stats by Jerry King: 2001-02 (archived)
Rules for classification: 1) points; 2) goal difference; 3) number of goals scored.

=== Division One South ===
Kent Football League Division One South
- Season: 2001–02
- Champions: Dover Athletic R
- Matches: 110
- Goals: 480 (4.36 per match)

The division featured 11 clubs, 10 of which had competed in the single Division One from the previous season, together with one additional club:

- Deal Town R

Also, Hythe United R changed its name to Hythe Town R.

==== League table ====
| Pos | Team | Pld | W | D | L | GF | GA | GD | Pts |
|---|---|---|---|---|---|---|---|---|---|
| 1 | Dover Athletic R | 20 | 16 | 3 | 1 | 76 | 18 | +58 | 53 (Note: Dover Athletic R were awarded two points) |
| 2 | Ramsgate R | 20 | 11 | 2 | 7 | 52 | 25 | +27 | 35 |
| 3 | Sittingbourne R | 20 | 10 | 4 | 6 | 43 | 33 | +10 | 34 |
| 4 | Deal Town R | 20 | 10 | 3 | 7 | 59 | 42 | +17 | 33 |
| 5 | Ashford Town (Kent) R | 20 | 8 | 6 | 6 | 43 | 29 | +14 | 30 |
| 6 | Folkestone Invicta R | 20 | 8 | 4 | 8 | 40 | 37 | +3 | 28 |
| 7 | Herne Bay R | 20 | 7 | 6 | 7 | 42 | 39 | +3 | 27 |
| 8 | Hastings Town R | 20 | 7 | 2 | 11 | 45 | 59 | −14 | 23 |
| 9 | Margate R | 20 | 6 | 4 | 10 | 36 | 54 | −18 | 22 |
| 10 | Whitstable Town R | 20 | 5 | 5 | 10 | 32 | 59 | −27 | 20 |
| 11 | Hythe Town R | 20 | 1 | 3 | 16 | 12 | 85 | −73 | 5 (Note: Hythe Town R were deducted one point) |

Source: FCHD (team pages)
Rules for classification: 1) points; 2) goal difference; 3) number of goals scored.

=== Reserves Cup ===
The 2001–02 Kent Football League Reserves Cup competition for teams from the Reserves Section was contested over a total of five rounds: the first two were on an aggregate home and away basis; the third round, the quarter-finals a single match; the semis finals again on an aggregate basis; and a single final match which was played on a neutral ground.

The Cup was won by Dover Athletic R who completed the League and Cup double. Their matches were:

- Final: Defeated Thamesmead Town R
- Semi-final: Defeated VCD Athletic R 6 – 3 on aggregate (a:2–1; h:4–2)
- Quarter-final: Won 4–2 at Margate R
- Second Round: Defeated Whitstable Town R 6 – 2 on aggregate (a:2–0; h:4–2)
- First Round: Bye
