= 2009–10 Kent Football League =

The 2009–10 Kent Football League season (known as the Bulmers Cider Kent League reflecting the sponsorship by Bulmers) was the 44th in the history of Kent Football League a football competition in England.

The League structure comprised three divisions: a Premier Division together with Divisions One and Two – the latter two were known as the Reserves Section, comprising reserves teams which were not permitted in the Premier Division. Additionally there were two league cup competitions, the Challenge Cup for the Premier Division clubs and another for the teams in the two divisions of the Reserves Section.

== Premier Division ==
Kent Football League Premier Division
- Season: 2009–10
- Champions: Faversham Town
- Promoted: Faversham Town
- Matches: 240
- Goals: 822 (3.43 per match)

The division featured 16 clubs, 14 of which competed in the previous season together with two additional clubs:

- Corinthian, returned to the senior football after resigning in 2004
- Fisher, new club formed after Fisher Athletic F.C. folded

At the end of the season Faversham Town were promoted to the Isthmian League Division One South

=== League table ===
Pos	Team	Pld	W	D	L	GF	GA	GD	Pts	Promotion
1	Faversham Town	30	24	2	4	79	23	+56	74	Promoted to the Isthmian League Division One South
2	Herne Bay	30	22	2	6	75	36	+39	68	
3	Hythe Town	30	15	8	7	67	36	+31	53	
4	Beckenham Town	30	16	5	9	56	39	+17	53	
5	Greenwich Borough	30	14	8	8	52	39	+13	50	
6	Sevenoaks Town	30	14	4	12	56	50	+6	46	
7	Tunbridge Wells	30	11	8	11	51	50	+1	41	
8	Erith Town	30	11	7	12	52	49	+3	40	
9	Deal Town	30	11	6	13	49	60	−11	39	
10	Holmesdale	30	11	3	16	47	47	0	36	
11	Norton Sports	30	10	6	14	41	48	−7	36	
12	Erith & Belvedere	30	10	6	14	45	62	−17	36	
13	Fisher	30	9	5	16	41	58	−17	32	
14	Corinthian	30	9	3	18	32	66	−34	30	
15	Sporting Bengal United	30	7	4	19	44	95	−51	25	
16	Lordswood	30	3	9	18	35	64	−29	18	

Source: FCHD
Rules for classification: 1) points; 2) goal difference; 3) number of goals scored.

=== Results ===
Home \ Away	BEC	COR	DEA	E&B	ERI	FAV	FIS	GRE	HER	HOL	HYT	LOR	NOR	SEV	SPB	TUN
Beckenham Town		2–0	5–1	2–2	5–0	0–1	0–1	2–1	2–4	4–3	0–1	2–2	2–1	2–1	0–0	2–1
Corinthian	0–5		1–0	1–3	1–2	1–2	2–2	2–1	1–0	0–6	1–2	2–1	0–1	2–3	1–3	3–0
Deal Town	0–1	3–0		2–1	2–1	0–1	1–0	2–1	1–4	2–1	1–1	0–0	1–4	2–2	7–1	3–1
Erith & Belvedere	2–1	0–1	3–1		1–0	3–1	1–3	2–2	0–4	0–0	1–1	1–6	1–3	1–1	2–3	5–1
Erith Town	1–1	2–2	0–1	2–0		0–1	4–2	2–2	2–2	4–0	3–4	6–1	3–2	2–1	3–0	1–1
Faversham Town	1–2	8–0	6–1	6–1	3–0		0–1	4–0	3–0	4–1	2–1	5–1	3–1	1–0	0–0	6–2
Fisher	1–2	1–2	2–0	1–2	1–1	1–3		0–3	3–5	0–1	0–4	1–1	0–3	0–1	2–2	2–1
Greenwich Borough	4–1	3–2	2–1	3–2	0–1	3–2	4–0		2–0	1–0	2–2	1–1	1–1	2–2	3–0	0–3
Herne Bay	2–1	1–1	4–2	1–0	3–0	2–4	1–0	1–0		1–0	1–2	4–2	2–1	0–2	9–0	3–0
Holmesdale	1–2	3–0	4–0	4–1	1–2	0–1	0–3	2–0	1–2		3–1	2–1	0–1	3–4	3–2	0–2
Hythe Town	3–1	0–1	0–0	5–2	3–1	1–2	6–0	1–1	0–2	4–0		1–1	1–2	1–0	6–1	0–0
Lordswood	1–2	1–2	0–1	2–2	0–4	1–3	0–3	0–3	0–2	1–2	0–5		0–1	1–3	4–1	1–1
Norton Sports	1–1	2–1	3–3	0–1	2–2	0–1	1–3	1–2	1–2	1–1	1–1	1–0		1–2	1–3	1–3
Sevenoaks Town	1–4	3–1	2–4	0–1	1–0	0–3	1–3	1–2	1–5	2–1	4–3	1–1	4–1		8–1	1–0
Sporting Bengal United	0–2	3–1	6–4	3–4	2–1	0–2	3–3	1–3	1–3	0–3	3–4	1–4	3–0	0–3		1–3
Tunbridge Wells	2–0	4–0	3–3	2–1	4–2	0–0	3–2	0–0	3–5	1–1	0–3	1–1	1–2	2–1	6–0	

Source: Kent League (archived)
Legend: Blue = home team win; Yellow = draw; Red = away team win.

=== Challenge Cup ===
The 2009–10 Kent Football League Challenge Cup, known as the Bulmers Cider Kent League Cup (reflecting the sponsorship by Bulmers), was won by Herne Bay.

The competition was contested by the 16 teams from the Premier Division over a total of four rounds: three on an aggregate basis (home and away matches) followed by a final match played on a neutral ground (at Folkestone Invicta F.C. this season).

==== Quarter-finals, Semi-finals and Final ====
Quarter-finals
Sevenoaks Town	1	5	6
Deal Town	1	3	4
Beckenham Town	2	3	5
Erith Town	0	2	2
Hythe Town	0	1	1
Herne Bay	2	1	3
Faversham Town	2	3	5
Erith & Belvedere	1	1	2

Semi-finals
Sevenoaks Town	2	3	5 (Note: Sevenoaks win on away goals)
Beckenham Town	2	3	5
Herne Bay	3	1	4
Faversham	1	1	2

Final
Sevenoaks Town	2 (Note: After extra time played; score at 90 mins: 2-2)
Herne Bay	3

==== First Round ====
- Sevenoaks Town 3 – 3 Norton Sports (1st Leg 1–2; 2nd Leg 2–1). Sevenoaks won 3–2 on penalties
- Lordswood 3 – 4 Deal Town (1st Leg 1–2; 2nd Leg 2–2)
- Sporting Bengal United 2 – 9 Beckenham Town (1st Leg 1–3; 2nd Leg 1–6)
- Erith Town 3 – 2 Greenwich Borough (1st Leg 2–1; 2nd Leg 1–1)
- Tunbridge Wells 2 – 5 Hythe Town (1st Leg 1–3; 2nd Leg 1–2)
- Holmesdale 1 – 3 Herne Bay (1st Leg 1–2; 2nd Leg 0–1)
- Fisher 2 – 4 Faversham Town (1st Leg 0–2; 2nd Leg 2–2)
- Corinthian 2 – 3 Erith & Belvedere (1st Leg 2–2; 2nd Leg 0–1)

Source: SCEFL Archives

== Reserves Section ==
The letter "R" following team names indicates a club's reserves team.

The 2009–10 Reserves Section comprised two divisions, with promotion and relegation possible between the divisions. Promotion from the Reserves Section into the Premier Division was not permitted. There was a single League Cup competition for all teams in the section.

=== Division One ===
Kent Football League Division One
- Season: 2009–10
- Champions: Herne Bay R
- Matches: 110
- Goals: 401 (3.65 per match)

The division featured eleven clubs, nine of which competed in the previous season together with Holmesdale R and Herne Bay R who had both been promoted from Division Two.

At the end of the season Ashford Town (Kent) R and Dartfords R left the league.

==== League table ====
Pos	Team	Pld	W	D	L	GF	GA	GD	Pts	Season End Notes
1	Herne Bay R	20	13	5	2	47	26	+21	44	
2	Erith & Belvedere R	20	11	4	5	40	30	+10	37	
3	Maidstone United R	20	10	6	4	35	23	+12	36	
4	Dartford R	20	10	2	8	46	28	+18	32	Resigned from the League
5	Cray Wanderers R	20	7	7	6	45	40	+5	28	
6	Thamesmead Town R	20	6	8	6	31	37	−6	26	
7	Ashford Town (Kent) R	20	6	6	8	27	30	−3	24	Resigned from the League
8	Chatham Town R	20	7	3	10	33	37	−4	24	
9	Whitstable Town R	20	5	7	8	43	52	−9	22	
10	Margate R	20	6	3	11	24	46	−22	21	
11	Holmesdale R	20	3	1	16	30	52	−22	10	

Source: Kent League (archived)
Rules for classification: 1) points; 2) goal difference; 3) number of goals scored.

==== Results ====
Home \ Away	ASH	CHA	CRA	DAR	E&B	HER	HOL	MAI	MAR	THA	WHI
Ashford Town (Kent) R		0–2	1–1	0–3	1–2	0–1	3–1	4–1	0–2	1–1	3–3
Chatham Town R	1–2		0–2	1–0	2–3	4–1	2–0	1–4	0–1	1–2	7–0
Cray Wanderers R	2–2	4–2		0–3	3–4	3–4	3–1	2–2	2–0	1–1	6–6
Dartford R	2–0	2–2	4–2		0–2	1–3	2–1	2–1	8–1	2–2	3–0
Erith & Belvedere R	0–4	6–0	2–1	0–2		3–3	1–0	3–0	4–1	0–1	4–4
Herne Bay R	1–1	3–1	2–1	2–1	4–0		3–0	2–1	3–0	1–1	1–1
Holmesdale R	1–3	0–1	1–2	0–4	1–2	2–5		1–1	6–2	3–1	3–0
Maidstone United R	1–0	3–1	1–1	1–0	1–0	1–1	4–0		1–1	2–0	2–0
Margate R	0–0	1–2	1–4	2–1	0–2	1–4	3–2	0–2		1–1	3–6
Thamesmead Town R	0–2	1–1	2–2	6–5	0–0	0–4	5–4	2–4	1–1		3–0
Whitstable Town R	5–0	2–2	1–3	2–1	2–2	1–2	5–3	2–2	0–1	3–1	

Source: Kent League (archived)
Legend: Blue = home team win; Yellow = draw; Red = away team win.

=== Division Two ===
Kent Football League Division Two
- Season: 2009–10
- Champions: Erith Town R
- Matches: 90
- Goals: 314 (3.49 per match)

The division featured ten clubs, six of which competed in the previous season together with four additional clubs:

- Folkestone Invicta R, relegated from Division One
- Sevenoaks Town R, relegated from Division One
- Beckenham Town R, returning to the league after an absence of four years
- Erith Town R, returning to the league after one year away

At the end of the season Erith Town R and Beckenham Town R were promoted to Division One.

==== League table ====
Pos	Team	Pld	W	D	L	GF	GA	GD	Pts	Season End Notes
1	Erith Town R	18	10	3	5	38	20	+18	33	Promoted to Division One
2	Beckenham Town R	18	9	5	4	41	25	+16	32	Promoted to Division One
3	Sevenoaks Town R	18	9	4	5	39	33	+6	31	
4	VCD Athletic R	18	8	4	6	30	25	+5	28	
5	Deal Town R	18	8	4	6	32	32	0	28	
6	Faversham Town R	18	6	6	6	28	25	+3	24	
7	Lordswood R	18	7	2	9	24	33	−9	23	
8	Folkestone Invicta R	18	5	4	9	28	42	−14	19	
9	Hythe Town R	18	4	4	10	23	36	−13	16	
10	Ramsgate R	18	3	6	9	31	43	−12	15	

Source: Kent League (archived)
Rules for classification: 1) points; 2) goal difference; 3) number of goals scored.

==== Results ====
Home \ Away	BEC	DEA	ERI	FAV	FOL	HYT	LOR	RAM	SEV	VCD
Beckenham Town R		2–5	0–1	1–1	2–0	4–0	3–2	4–0	3–1	4–0
Deal Town R	1–5		1–0	0–2	1–1	2–1	2–0	1–1	4–3	1–1
Erith Town R	1–1	3–2		0–1	6–2	4–0	0–1	1–1	3–2	0–1
Faversham Town R	3–3	1–2	0–1		0–2	3–3	3–0	1–4	0–0	2–1
Folkestone Invicta R	2–2	0–1	0–2	1–5		2–1	1–0	2–5	1–2	1–0
Hythe Town R	0–1	1–3	2–3	2–2	0–0		1–0	3–2	1–3	0–3
Lordswood R	3–2	1–2	0–4	1–0	6–5	0–2		3–2	0–2	1–2
Ramsgate R	3–3	2–2	3–3	0–1	1–2	0–4	0–2		3–2	0–3
Sevenoaks Town R	2–0	4–2	1–5	2–1	5–3	1–1	2–2	3–1		2–0
VCD Athletic R	0–1	3–1	2–1	2–2	3–3	3–1	1–1	2–3	3–1	

Source: Kent League (archived)
Legend: Blue = home team win; Yellow = draw; Red = away team win.

=== Reserves Cup ===
The 2009–10 Kent Football League Reserves Cup, known as the Blu3 Kent Reserves League Cup for sponsorship reasons, was won by Dartford R.

The competition was contested by all 21 teams of the Reserves Section over a total of five rounds: the first three were single match knock-out rounds, followed by the semi-finals on an aggregate basis (home and away matches) and then the final match played on a neutral ground (at Welling United F.C. this season).

==== Quarter-finals, Semi-finals and Final ====
Quarter-finals
Beckenham Town R	2
VCD Athletic R	3
Erith Town R	2
Ramsgate R	0
Chatham Town R	1	4p
Ashford Town (Kent) R	1	1p
Maidstone United R	1
Dartford R	4

Semi-finals
VCD Athletic R	0	2	2 (Note: VCD Athletic R win on away goals)
Erith Town R	0	2	2
Chatham Town R	0	0	0
Dartford R	0	3	3

Final
VCD Athletic R	1 (Note: After extra time)
Dartford R	2

==== Second Round ====
- Beckenham Town R 0 – 0 (pens: 5 – 4) Faversham Town R
- VCD Athletic R 2 – 1 Margate R
- Erith Town R 1 – 0 Cray Wanderers R
- Ramsgate R 3 – 1 Folkestone Invicta R
- Chatham Town R 4 – 0 Holmesdale R
- Ashford Town (Kent) R 3 – 0 Hythe Town R
- Thamesmead Town R 1 – 3 Maidstone United R
- Dartford R 3 – 2 Erith & Belvedere R (After extra time)

==== First Round ====
- Sevenoaks Town R 1 – 2 Erith Town R
- Ramsgate R 2 – 1 Herne Bay R
- Deal Town R 0 – 3 Chatham Town R
- Lordswood R 3 – 4 Holmesdale R
- Whitstable Town R 0 – 5 Dartford R

Byes for remaining 11 teams

Source: SCEFL Archives
