= 2004–05 Kent Football League =

The 2004–05 Kent Football League season (known as the Go Travel Kent League for sponsorship reasons) was the 39th in the history of Kent Football League a football competition in England.

The League structure comprised three divisions: a Premier Division together with Divisions One and Two – the latter two were known as the Reserves Section, comprising reserves teams which were not permitted in the Premier Division. Additionally there were two league cup competitions, the Challenge Cup for the Premier Division clubs and another for the teams in the two divisions of the Reserves Section.

== Premier Division ==
Kent Football League Premier Division
- Season: 2004–05
- Champions: Ramsgate
- Promoted: Ramsgate
- Matches: 240
- Goals: 833 (3.47 per match)

The league featured 16 clubs which competed in the previous season, no additional clubs joined the league this season.

At the end of the season Ramsgate were promoted to the Isthmian League Division One.

=== League table ===
Pos	Team	Pld	W	D	L	GF	GA	GD	Pts	Promotion
1	Ramsgate	30	22	4	4	65	27	+38	70	Promoted to the Isthmian League Division One
2	Herne Bay	30	19	5	6	68	41	+27	62	
3	Whitstable Town	30	16	6	8	71	44	+27	54	
4	Maidstone United	30	16	6	8	60	37	+23	54	
5	VCD Athletic	30	16	6	8	67	51	+16	54	
6	Hythe Town	30	14	5	11	46	42	+4	47	
7	Tunbridge Wells	30	12	9	9	45	49	−4	47 (Note: Tunbridge Wells were awarded two points.)	
8	Thamesmead Town	30	13	5	12	63	54	+9	44	
9	Greenwich Borough	30	13	4	13	52	54	−2	43	
10	Beckenham Town	30	11	7	12	57	54	+3	39 (Note: Beckenham Town were deducted one point.)	
11	Sevenoaks Town	30	9	6	15	47	66	−19	33	
12	Slade Green	30	8	6	16	40	56	−16	30	
13	Deal Town	30	8	5	17	40	62	−22	29	
14	Sporting Bengal United	30	8	5	17	42	71	−29	29	
15	Erith Town	30	6	5	19	33	60	−27	23	
16	Lordswood	30	5	4	21	37	65	−28	19	

Source: FCHD
Rules for classification: 1) points; 2) goal difference; 3) number of goals scored.

=== Results ===
Home \ Away	BEC	DEA	ERI	GRE	HER	HYT	LOR	MAI	RAM	SEV	SLA	SPB	THA	TUN	VCD	WHI
Beckenham Town		1–0	4–1	1–2	1–0	1–1	1–1	0–1	2–2	2–1	4–2	3–0	3–6	3–1	2–3	3–1
Deal Town	1–0		1–2	1–4	2–3	2–1	1–2	3–2	0–3	0–1	3–1	0–2	2–2	2–2	0–3	1–3
Erith Town	2–5	0–1		1–2	1–2	1–2	0–2	0–2	1–3	0–0	1–1	3–1	0–6	2–0	2–0	0–2
Greenwich Borough	1–1	4–3	1–3		1–3	1–2	3–2	0–2	1–3	2–3	2–0	3–0	2–1	5–0	2–1	1–3
Herne Bay	3–3	4–2	6–1	4–1		2–1	2–0	1–0	3–1	1–1	1–0	2–6	1–0	2–0	1–2	3–2
Hythe Town	3–1	2–1	1–0	0–1	2–2		1–2	0–3	1–2	3–1	1–0	0–2	2–0	1–2	1–2	1–5
Lordswood	2–4	3–4	0–0	1–3	1–4	2–7		1–3	0–2	0–1	0–1	1–2	1–2	0–0	1–2	2–2
Maidstone United	3–1	5–0	1–0	1–1	2–1	1–1	2–0		1–5	3–4	3–0	0–1	4–1	2–1	0–1	1–1
Ramsgate	3–1	1–0	2–1	2–1	0–0	0–0	2–0	2–1		4–0	2–0	4–0	3–0	4–1	0–1	3–2
Sevenoaks Town	1–1	1–3	2–5	4–2	2–5	1–2	2–1	2–4	1–3		3–1	1–4	1–4	1–1	2–1	0–3
Slade Green	0–1	2–3	2–0	3–0	1–1	1–2	2–1	3–3	1–3	3–1		3–2	1–1	1–1	1–2	2–1
Sporting Bengal United	3–2	4–2	0–2	1–1	1–2	1–1	1–2	1–4	1–1	0–7	0–1		1–3	1–1	2–5	2–5
Thamesmead Town	3–2	1–1	1–1	2–0	2–3	2–3	2–5	3–2	0–1	4–0	3–0	3–0		2–2	1–5	2–0
Tunbridge Wells	1–0	0–0	2–1	3–1	1–0	2–1	3–1	1–2	2–1	1–0	5–4	2–0	4–2		1–4	2–2
VCD Athletic	4–3	2–0	3–2	2–2	2–5	1–2	1–0	1–1	2–3	1–1	3–3	2–2	1–2	1–3		3–4
Whitstable Town	2–0	1–1	3–0	1–2	2–1	0–1	5–3	1–1	3–0	2–2	3–0	5–1	3–2	2–0	2–4	

Source: Kent League (archived)
Legend: Blue = home team win; Yellow = draw; Red = away team win.

=== Challenge Cup ===
The 2004–05 Kent Football League Challenge Cup was won by Ramsgate who completed the League and Cup double.

The competition was contested by the 16 teams from the Premier Division over a total of four rounds: the first two a single match knock-out followed by the semis-finals on an aggregate basis (home and away matches) and the final match played on a neutral ground (at Folkestone Invicta F.C. this season).

==== Quarter-finals, Semi-finals and Final ====
Quarter-finals
Sevenoaks Town	0 (Note: After extra time)
Ramsgate	1
Slade Green	0
Thamesmead Town	3
Herne Bay	5
Tunbridge Wells	1
Hythe Town	1
Maidstone United	0

Semi-finals
Ramsgate	1	1	2
Thamesmead Town	0	1	1
Herne Bay	1	1	2
Hythe Town	0	0	0

Final
Ramsgate
Herne Bay

==== First Round ====
The following teams were eliminated in the first round

- Beckenham Town, lost a home match 3–1 on penalties (after a 0–0 draw after extra time) to Hythe Town
- Deal Town
- Erith Town, beaten 3–1 by Thamesmead Town
- Greenwich Borough, lost a home match 6–5 on penalties (after a 4–4 draw after extra time) to Herne Bay
- Lordswood
- Sporting Bengal United
- VCD Athletic, lost an away match 1–0 to Maidstone United
- Whitstable Town, beaten by Ramsgate

Sources: Herne Bay FC: club (archived) & Maidstone United FC (archived) & Hythe Town FC (archived)

== Reserves Section ==
The letter "R" following team names indicates a club’s reserves team.

The 2004–05 Reserves Section comprised two divisions, with promotion and relegation possible between the divisions. Promotion from the Reserves Section into the Premier Division was not permitted. There was a single League Cup competition for all teams in the section.

=== Division One ===
Kent Football League Division One
- Season: 2004–05
- Champions: Erith & Belvedere R
- Matches: 132
- Goals: 451 (3.42 per match)

The division featured twelve clubs, ten of which had competed the previous season together two additional clubs, Erith & Belvedere R and Maidstone United R, who had both been promoted from Division Two.

At the end of the season Hastings United R and Danson Furness left the league – the latter club, who had been Premier Division league and cup-winners in 1995–96 (when known as Furness), were the final non-reserves team to compete in Division One.

==== League table ====
Pos	Team	Pld	W	D	L	GF	GA	GD	Pts	Season End Notes
1	Erith & Belvedere R	22	17	0	5	50	16	+34	51	
2	Maidstone United R	22	16	3	3	52	29	+23	51	
3	Cray Wanderers R	22	14	3	5	49	24	+25	45	
4	Thamesmead Town R	22	11	5	6	50	36	+14	38	
5	Ramsgate R	22	10	2	10	32	28	+4	32	
6	Ashford Town (Kent) R	22	9	2	11	40	45	−5	29	
7	Danson Furness	22	8	5	9	33	39	−6	29	Resigned from the League
8	Dartford R	22	8	3	11	32	34	−2	27	
9	Erith Town R	22	5	10	7	33	34	−1	25	
10	Herne Bay R	22	5	4	13	24	47	−23	19	
11	Hastings United R	22	4	3	15	28	67	−39	15	Resigned from the League
12	Deal Town R	22	3	4	15	28	52	−24	13	

Source: Ashford Town FC (archived), FCHD (team pages)
Rules for classification: 1) points; 2) goal difference; 3) number of goals scored.

==== Results ====
Home \ Away	ASH	CRA	DAN	DAR	DEA	E&B	ERI	HAS	HER	MAI	RAM	THA
Ashford Town (Kent) R		1–3	3–1	0–2	2–2	0–4	5–1	6–1	1–2	1–3	1–4	3–2
Cray Wanderers R	1–3		2–1	2–0	6–0	0–2	3–0	3–0	2–0	2–2	2–0	2–2
Danson Furness	0–2	0–2		1–2	2–2	1–0	1–1	3–3	1–2	3–1	1–0	1–3
Dartford R	2–3	0–2	2–3		0–1	0–2	0–0	6–3	3–2	1–2	2–2	3–1
Deal Town R	2–2	1–3	1–2	0–1		1–2	0–2	4–1	2–3	2–4	0–2	3–4
Erith & Belvedere R	0–1	2–1	5–1	1–3	2–1		1–0	12–1	2–0	0–1	3–0	4–0
Erith Town R	4–1	7–3	0–1	0–0	2–2	1–2		3–1	1–1	2–4	0–1	2–2
Hastings United R	2–1	1–5	1–4	2–1	0–2	0–1	1–1		1–2	0–1	2–1	2–3
Herne Bay R	0–1	0–2	2–2	0–2	2–1	1–2	1–1	1–1		1–7	0–1	2–4
Maidstone United R	5–2	1–0	2–2	1–0	3–1	2–0	2–2	1–3	3–2		1–0	4–2
Ramsgate R	2–1	0–2	1–2	2–1	4–0	1–2	0–1	4–1	1–0	3–1		1–3
Thamesmead Town R	2–0	1–1	2–0	4–0	3–0	0–1	2–2	2–1	6–0	0–1	2–2	

Source: Kent League (archived)
Legend: Blue = home team win; Yellow = draw; Red = away team win.

=== Division Two ===
Kent Football League Division Two
- Season: 2004–05
- Champions: Whitstable Town R
- Matches: 156
- Goals: 512 (3.28 per match)

The division featured thirteen clubs, ten of which competed in the previous season together with three additional clubs:

- Bromley R
- Slade Green R
- Welling United R who stayed in the League for one season

At the end of the season Whitstable Town R and Bromley R were promoted to Division One and Beckenham Town R and Welling United R left the League.

==== League table ====
Pos	Team	Pld	W	D	L	GF	GA	GD	Pts	Season End Notes
1	Whitstable Town R	24	16	7	1	47	11	+36	55	Promoted to Division One
2	Bromley R	24	14	5	5	44	22	+22	44 (Note: Bromley R deducted three points)	Promoted to Division One
3	Beckenham Town R	24	11	6	7	49	32	+17	39	Resigned from the League
4	Sevenoaks Town R	24	12	2	10	38	37	+1	38	
5	Slade Green R	24	10	7	7	39	34	+5	37	
6	Chatham Town R	24	10	6	8	50	36	+14	36	
7	VCD Athletic R	24	10	5	9	43	37	+6	35	
8	Folkestone Invicta R	24	9	6	9	49	40	+9	33	
9	Hythe Town R	24	8	8	8	35	39	−4	32	
10	Welling United R	24	7	8	9	25	31	−6	29	Resigned from the League
11	Sittingbourne R	24	6	1	17	38	65	−27	22 (Note: Sittingbourne R awarded three points)	
12	Tunbridge Wells R	24	6	2	16	29	59	−30	20	
13	Lordswood R	24	4	3	17	26	69	−43	15	

Source: Sittingbourne FC (incomplete table), FCHD (team pages)
Rules for classification: 1) points; 2) goal difference; 3) number of goals scored.

==== Results ====
Home \ Away	BEC	BRO	CHA	FOL	HYT	LOR	SEV	SIT	SLA	TUN	VCD	WEL	WHI
Beckenham Town R		1–4	3–1	4–0	4–0	4–2	6–0	3–0	1–2	1–3	0–1	2–4	0–0
Bromley R	0–2		2–1	1–0	0–2	5–0	0–1	4–1	2–2	3–2	1–0	2–0	2–0
Chatham Town R	0–2	1–1		5–1	1–1	4–1	3–1	3–0	1–0	2–0	0–1	0–0	0–0
Folkestone Invicta R	5–1	2–0	2–2		1–1	5–1	1–2	7–0	1–4	0–2	5–2	2–2	0–2
Hythe Town R	2–2	2–1	1–6	1–1		1–1	1–2	3–2	0–0	4–1	0–1	1–1	0–1
Lordswood R	1–1	0–3	0–3	1–4	2–4		0–3	1–1	2–1	3–1	3–1	1–2	0–3
Sevenoaks Town R	0–1	1–3	5–0	0–1	2–0	1–2		2–0	4–2	2–3	0–0	2–1	0–1
Sittingbourne R	0–3	0–2	4–1	2–5	1–2	4–3	1–4		2–0	10–1	2–6	1–0	1–2
Slade Green R	2–2	1–1	3–3	1–1	0–3	2–1	0–2	4–1		3–1	2–1	2–1	0–0
Tunbridge Wells R	1–3	0–3	1–6	1–0	1–1	2–1	0–1	1–3	1–2		1–3	0–1	2–2
VCD Athletic R	1–1	1–2	2–1	3–5	3–2	7–1	7–3	2–0	0–2	0–3		1–1	0–0
Welling United R	2–1	1–1	2–4	0–0	1–3	2–0	0–0	0–4	2–0	0–0	2–0		0–2
Whitstable Town R	1–1	1–1	3–2	2–0	4–0	6–0	4–0	4–1	3–0	3–1	2–0	1–0	

Source: Kent League (archived) &
Legend: Blue = home team win; Yellow = draw; Red = away team win.

=== Reserves Cup ===
The 2004–05 Kent Football League Reserves Cup competition for teams from the Reserves Section was contested over a total of five rounds: the first three were single match knock-out rounds, followed by the semi-finals on an aggregate basis (home and away matches) and the final match.

The Cup was won by Division Two club Beckenham Town R, their matches were

- Final: defeated fellow Division Two club Bromley R in the final
- Semi-final: defeated Slade Green R on aggregate over two matches
- Quarter-final: Won 3–2 at Hastings United R
- Second Round: a home win 4–1 over Dartford R
- First Round: a 5–1 victory at Danson Furness

Source: Kent League (archived) & Beckenham Town FC: Fixtures (archived)
