= 1971–72 Kent Football League =

Association football league season

The 1971–72 Kent Football League season was the sixth in the history of the Kent Football League, a football competition based in and around the county of Kent in England.

The league comprised one division and there was also a league cup competition, the Challenge Cup.

== League ==
Kent Football League
- Season: 1971–72
- Champions: Chatham Town
- Matches: 378
- Goals: 1,324 (3.5 per match)

The league featured teams from 20 clubs, including ten reserves teams. Seventeen of the clubs had competed in the league the previous season and they were joined by three additional clubs:

- Dartford Reserves
- Dover Reserves
- Deal Town joined from the Greater London League and replaced their reserves team

The league was won by Chatham Town, who completed a League and Cup double.

At the end of the season Dartford Reserves resigned. Both bottom two clubs, Sheppey United Reserves and Ramsgate Athletic Reserves, were re-elected back into the league. with the former being replaced by their first team.

=== League table ===
Pos	Team	Pld	W	D	L	GF	GA	GAv	Pts	Season End Notes
1	Chatham Town	38	25	11	2	113	35	3.229	61	
2	Brett Sports	38	26	6	6	90	37	2.432	58	
3	Tonbridge Reserves	38	23	9	6	93	59	1.576	55	
4	Sittingbourne	38	18	11	9	72	51	1.412	47	
5	Kent Police	38	18	10	10	90	56	1.607	46	
6	Deal Town	38	16	11	11	92	60	1.533	43	
7	Dartford Amateurs (Note: Missing Ramsgate Athletic Reserves versus Dartford Amateurs)	37	15	13	9	57	48	1.188	43	
8	Slade Green Athletic	38	16	9	13	50	37	1.351	41	
9	Ashford Town Reserves	38	14	11	13	70	79	0.886	39	
10	Dover Reserves (Note: Missing Dover Reserves versus Folkestone Reserves)	37	13	12	12	51	41	1.244	38	
11	Dartford Reserves	38	12	13	13	62	67	0.925	37	Resigned from the league
12	Crockenhill	38	13	6	19	56	71	0.789	32	
13	Bexley United Reserves	38	11	9	18	58	77	0.753	31	
14	Folkestone Reserves	37	10	11	16	59	80	0.738	31	
15	Hastings United Reserves	38	10	10	18	51	86	0.593	30	
16	Margate Reserves	38	11	7	20	60	95	0.632	29	
17	Tunbridge Wells	38	6	15	17	51	73	0.699	27	
18	Whitstable Town	38	10	6	22	55	88	0.625	26	
19	Sheppey United Reserves	38	8	7	23	45	87	0.517	23	Re-elected (replaced by first team)
20	Ramsgate Athletic Reserves	37	6	7	24	49	97	0.505	19	Re-elected

Source: "Soccer Tables: Kent League". Evening Post. 10 May 1972. p. 19 – via British Newspaper Archive.; with additional games: "Kent League 1966–1992: 1971–1972". nonleaguematters.; "Below-par Reserves fail at Slade Green; Draw follows lively start". Sheerness Times Guardian. 12 May 1972. p. 9 – via British Newspaper Archive.; "Rash tackle costs Town the match". Whitstable Herald. 12 May 1972. p. 4 – via British Newspaper Archive.; "Sports Summary: Soccer: Kent League". Daily Mirror. 11 May 1972. p. 27 – via British Newspaper Archive.; "County details: Results: Saturday: Kent League; Monday:Kent League; Tuesday:Kent League". Kentish Express. 19 May 1972. p. 12 – via British Newspaper Archive.; "Results: Kent League". Daily Mirror. 18 May 1972. p. 31 – via British Newspaper Archive.; "Sports Summary: Soccer: Kent League". Daily Mirror. 19 May 1972. p. 31 – via British Newspaper Archive.; "County details: Results: Saturday: Kent League; Tuesday: Kent League". Kentish Express. 26 May 1972. p. 12 – via British Newspaper Archive.; "Champions – Officially". Evening Post. 25 May 1972. p. 28 – via British Newspaper Archive.; "Champs are held". Evening Post. 30 May 1972. p. 23 – via British Newspaper Archive.
Rules for classification: 1) points; 2) goal average.

== Challenge Cup ==
The 1971–72 Kent Football League Challenge Cup was won by Chatham Town, who completed a League and Cup double.

The competition, contested by all twenty clubs in the league, comprised five single match tie rounds culminating in the final which was played on a neutral ground (at Sittingbourne F.C. this season).

=== Quarter-finals, Semi-finals and Final ===
Quarter-finals
Tonbridge Reserves	0
Slade Green Athletic	1
Chatham Town	1
Sittingbourne	0
Hastings United Reserves	0
Ashford Town Reserves	3
Bexley United Reserves	3
Brett Sports	1

Semi-finals
Slade Green Athletic	0
Chatham Town	4
Ashford Town Reserves	3
Bexley United Reserves	2

Final
Chatham Town	3
Ashford Town Reserves	0

=== Second Round ===
- Tonbridge Reserves 3 – 2 Sheppey United Reserves
- Slade Green Athletic 1 – 0 Margate Reserves
- Dover Reserves 0 – 0 Chatham Town
- REPLAY 1: Chatham Town 1 – 1 (aet) Dover Reserves
- REPLAY 2: Dover Reserves 1 – 2 (aet) Chatham Town (score at 90 minutes 1–1)
- Sittingbourne 2 – 0 Deal Town
- Crockenhill 1 – 3 Hastings United Reserves
- Dartford Amateurs 2 – 2 Ashford Town Reserves
- REPLAY: Ashford Town Reserves 2 – 1 Dartford Amateurs
- Bexley United Reserves 2 – 1 Kent Police
- Brett Sports 6 – 2 Dartford Reserves

=== First Round ===
- Whitstable Town 0 – 4 Dover Reserves
- Tunbridge Wells 0 – 1 Dartford Amateurs
- Folkestone Reserves 1 – 2 Bexley United Reserves
- Dartford Reserves 4 – 0 Ramsgate Athletic Reserves
- Byes for the other twelve clubs

Sources

- Final: "County Details: Results: Saturday: Kent League, League Cup Final". Kentish Express. 19 May 1972. p. 12 – via British Newspaper Archive.
- Semi-finals: "County Details: Results: Good Friday: Kent League, League Cup, Semi-final". Kent Messenger. 7 April 1972. p. 12 – via British Newspaper Archive.; "County Details: Results: Saturday: Kent League, League Cup, Semi-final". Kent Messenger. 7 April 1972. p. 12 – via British Newspaper Archive.
- Quarter-finals: "County Details: Results: Saturday: Kent League Cup 3rd round". Kent Messenger. 10 March 1972. p. 14 – via British Newspaper Archive.;"County Details: Results: Saturday: Kent League, League Cup, 3rd round". Kent Messenger. 24 March 1972. p. 16 – via British Newspaper Archive.
- Second Round: "Kent League: Results: League Cup 2nd Round". Sheerness Times Guardian. 10 December 1971. p. 9 – via British Newspaper Archive.; "Results: Kent League Cup (first round) (sic)". Thanet Times. 14 December 1971. p. 10 – via British Newspaper Archive.; "Super Gorham". Kentish Express. 17 December 1971. p. 22 – via British Newspaper Archive.; "Results: Kent League Cup". Thanet Times. 4 January 1972. p. 16 – via British Newspaper Archive.; Phillips, Terry (31 January 1972). "Driver goal clinches it". Evening Post. p. 17 – via British Newspaper Archive.; "County Details: Results: Saturday: Kent League Cup 2nd round". Kent Messenger. 10 March 1972. p. 14 – via British Newspaper Archive.
- First Round: "County Details: Results: Saturday: League Cup 1st round". Kent Messenger. 19 November 1971. p. 17 – via British Newspaper Archive.
