= Southern Counties East Football League =

English football league

- Founded: 1966; 60 years ago
- Country: England
- Divisions: 2
- Number of clubs: 36
- Level on pyramid: Levels 9–10
- Feeder to: Isthmian League Division One North/South
- Relegation to: Kent County League
- Domestic cup(s): National; FA Cup; FA Vase
- League cup: Southern Counties East Challenge Cup
- Current champions: Whitstable Town (Premier Division); A.F.C. Greenwich Borough (First Division) (2025–26)
- Website: scefl.com
- Current: 2026-27 season

The Southern Counties East Football League is an English football league established in 1966, which has teams based in Kent and Southeast London. Its two divisions are allocated at Step 5 and Step 6 of the National League System (which equates to Levels 9–10 of the overall English football league system). At its inception it was known as the Kent Premier League, and until 2013 as the Kent League.

There is no direct connection between this league and a previous Kent League that existed from 1894 to 1959, despite many clubs having spells of membership in both leagues.

== History ==
The current league was formed in 1966, from teams in and around the county of Kent, when the Thames & Medway Combination (which had its origins in 1896) was expanded and renamed the Kent Premier League. The league began with fourteen teams - five of the six members of the final Thames & Medway Combination season (Deal Town Reserves, Orpington Athletic, Sittingbourne Reserves, Snowdown CW and Tonbridge Reserves) plus nine additional members (Ashford Town Reserves, Bexley United Reserves, Canterbury City Reserves, Faversham Town, Folkestone Town Reserves, Margate Reserves, Ramsgate Athletic Reserves, Sheppey United Reserves,Tunbridge Wells Rangers Reserves). Additionally the teams contested a league cup competition. Two years later in 1968 the league was renamed the Kent Football League.

During its first ten years many of the league's members were reserve sides of Southern League teams; in 1975 there was an unsuccessful proposal to exclude reserves teams from the primary division and instigate a second division. There followed several seasons by the league of discouragement of reserves teams until the 1978–79 season when a division for first teams only was established, titled Division One and reserve teams were shifted into a newly formed Division Two (which didn't exclude first teams); a Division Two knock-out cup competition was also initiated. Subsequently all divisions below the league's top division were known as the 'Reserves Section' and there was no automatic promotion/relegation from the Reserves Section into/from the top division.

The league continued with this format until the 1998–1999 season when the divisions were renamed as the Premier Division and Division One (from Division One and Division Two respectively) - with floodlights being a requirement for clubs in the Premier Division. The following season Division One was split into two equal ranked regional (North and South) Divisions with a play-off match between the two winners to decide the Division One champion. After reverting to a single Division One for the 2000–01 season, for both the 2001–02 and 2002–03 seasons Division One was again split into North and South Divisions. Thereafter for the following nine seasons the Reserves section was divided into two merit based divisions, Division One and Division Two, with promotion/relegation between the two divisions; Division One initially comprised the higher ranked teams from the two regional Division One leagues with the new Division Two taking the remaining teams. For the 2012–2013 season, the final one the league was known as the Kent League, the competition reverted to a two division format comprising the Premier Division and Reserves Section Division One.

In 2013 the league changed its name to the Southern Counties East League, to reflect that many of its member clubs no longer played within the county of Kent. and reverted to a single division for three seasons. At the end of the 2015–16 season, the league merged with the Kent Invicta League: the former single Southern Counties East League was designated as the Premier Division and the former Kent Invicta league became the First Division.

== Promotion and relegation ==
From 1982 the league became a designated feeder league to the Southern League and during the following twenty seasons nine Kent League clubs gained promotion. From 2004, following further rationalisation of the structure of non-League football which saw the redrawing of the border between the Southern Football League and the Isthmian League, the Premier Division champions are promoted to the Isthmian League.

Prior to the 2011–12 season clubs could be relegated to the Kent County League, although in practice this rarely happened, albeit clubs had moved in the opposite direction on being elected to the Kent League. The formation of the new Kent Invicta Football League for the 2011–12 season created a league at Step 6 rather than Step 7 allowing for a less steep transition; clubs were regularly promoted from the Kent Invicta League but until it amalgamated with the SCEFL in 2015 no clubs were relegated to this step 6 league.

== Sponsorship ==
Following their sponsorship of the Kent League Cup for the 1984–85 season, cable-making company Winstonlead extended their sponsorship to cover the League and this ran for 15 seasons between 1985 and 1999 during which period the competition was styled as the Winstonlead Kent League. They were succeeded by brewing company Bass as sponsors for three seasons during which the league was titled the Bass Brewers Kent League. In 2002 Kent based travel agency business Go Travel were the sponsor with the competition known as the Go Travel Kent League. The sponsor changed in 2005 to the Kent on Sunday newspaper and for a single season, 2005–06, the league was known as the Kentish Observer League. There followed two years without a title sponsor until 2008 when it was sponsored for two seasons by Bulmers and named the Bulmers Cider Kent League. For the 2010–11 season, training and consultancy business Safety Net Associates were the sponsors with the league known as the Safety Net Associates Kent League. Thereafter for two seasons commencing with the 2011–12 season the league was sponsored by Hürlimann Sternbräu lager (brewed by Kentish brewers Shepherd Neame) and billed as the Kent Hurlimann Football League.

After six seasons without a title sponsor, in November 2019 shipping company Sea Pioneer was named as sponsor with the competition known as the Sea Pioneer Southern Counties East Football League – this arrangement ceased with the interruption of football in March 2020 owing to the COVID-19 pandemic. The league next announced a sponsorship agreement in June 2024 with Tunbridge Wells based property management firm Presence & Co., with the league known for the following two seasons as the Presence & Co. Southern Counties East Football League.

The League's knock-out cup competitions have intermittently attracted separate sponsorship: from 2011 to 2018 the Challenge Cup was sponsored by sportswear brand Macron; the Reserves Section cup was known for the 2008–09 season as the HAUC (Highways Agency Utilities Committee) Reserves Cup and for the following two seasons to 2010–11 was sponsored by (infrastructure provider) Blu3.

== Current structure and teams ==
Since 2016–17 the Premier Division has been designated at Step 5 and the First Division at Step 6 of the National League System (Levels 9–10 of the English football league system). Clubs are promoted from the Premier Division upwards to the Step 4 divisions of the Isthmian League and relegated from the First Division into its feeder league, the Kent County League.

For the 2026–27 season the two divisions comprise the following clubs:

=== Premier Division ===
- AFC Greenwich Borough
- Bearsted
- Beckenham Town
- Chislehurst Glebe
- Corinthian
- Erith & Belvedere
- Faversham Strike Force
- Fisher
- Hollands & Blair
- Kennington
- Larkfield & New Hythe Wanderers
- Petts Wood & Holmesdale (formerly Holmesdale)
- Phoenix Sports
- Rusthall
- SE Dons
- Snodland Town
- Sutton Athletic
- Tunbridge Wells

=== First Division ===
- Banstead Athletic
- Bridon Ropes
- Croydon
- FC Elmstead
- Greenways
- Halls Athletic
- Hythe Town
- Lewisham Borough
- Lordswood
- Lydd Town
- Minster
- Rochester United
- Sheppey Sports
- SC Thamesmead
- Stansfeld
- Staplehurst Monarchs
- Tooting Bec
- Welling Town

Additionally the teams from both divisions compete for the knock-out match basis Southern Counties East Challenge Cup

== League and Cup winners ==
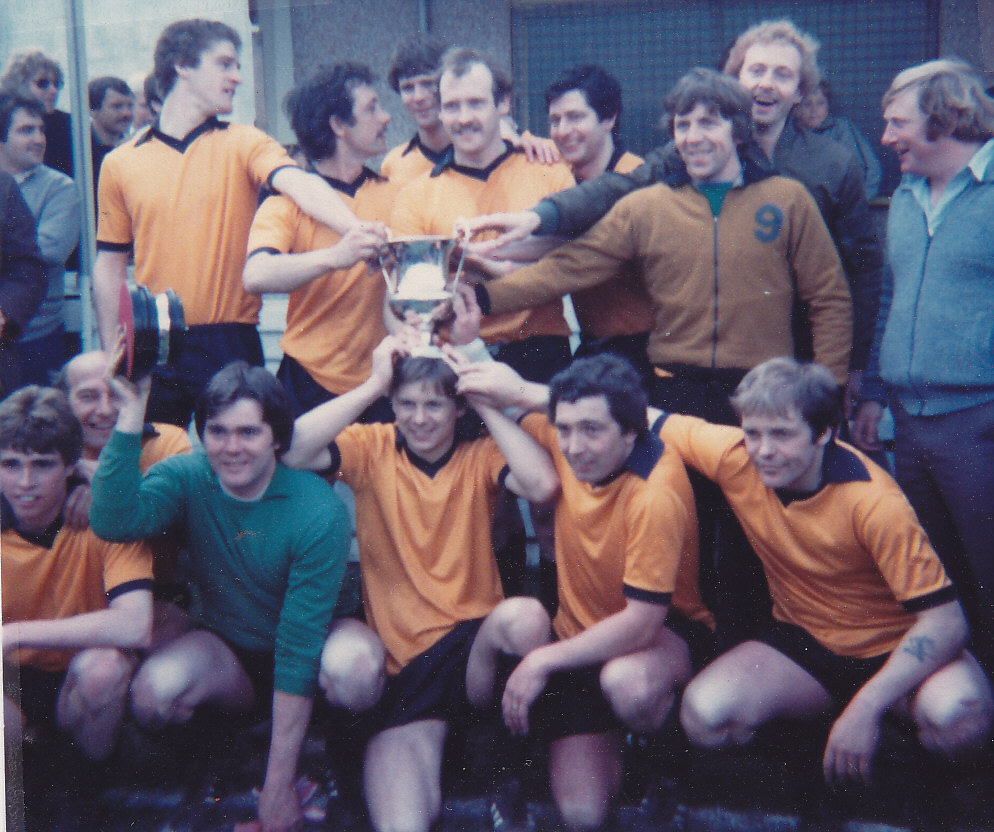
Cray Wanderers celebrate winning the title in 1981

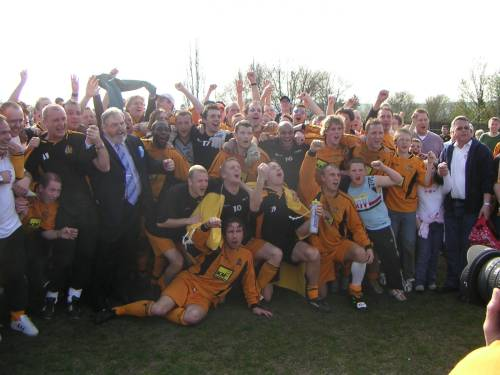
Maidstone United celebrate winning the title in 2006

Kent Premier League
Season	Kent Premier League	Premier League Cup		
1966–67	Margate Reserves	Margate Reserves		
1967–68	Margate Reserves	Brett Sports		
Kent Football League
Season	Kent Football League	Challenge Cup		
1968–69	Brett Sports	Margate Reserves		
1969–70	Faversham Town	Kent Police		
1970–71	Faversham Town	Faversham Town		
1971–72	Chatham Town	Chatham Town		
1972–73	Sheppey United	Folkestone Reserves		
1973–74	Chatham Town	Sittingbourne		
1974–75	Sheppey United	Tunbridge Wells		
1975–76	Sittingbourne	Sheppey United		
1976–77	Medway	Medway		
1977–78	Faversham Town	Tunbridge Wells		
Season	Division One	Challenge Cup	Reserves Section ('R'=Reserves team)	
Season	Division One	Challenge Cup	Division Two	Reserves Cup
1978–79	Sheppey United	Sheppey United	Medway R	Dover R.
1979–80	Chatham Town	Whitstable Town	Chatham Town R	Chatham Town R
1980–81	Cray Wanderers	Sittingbourne	Welling United R	Sittingbourne R
1981–82	Erith & Belvedere	Deal Town	Maidstone United R	Maidstone United R
1982–83	Crockenhill	Slade Green	Maidstone United R	Erith & Belvedere R
1983–84	Sittingbourne	Cray Wanderers	Fisher Athletic R	Erith & Belvedere R
1984–85	Tunbridge Wells	Greenwich Borough	Sheppey United R	Sheppey United R
1985–86	Alma Swanley	Tunbridge Wells	Fisher Athletic R	Faversham Town R
1986–87	Greenwich Borough	Greenwich Borough	Fisher Athletic R	Sittingbourne R
1987–88	Greenwich Borough	Tunbridge Wells	Fisher Athletic R	Sittingbourne R
1988–89	Hythe Town	Alma Swanley	Hythe Town R	Hythe Town R
1989–90	Faversham Town	Tonbridge AFC	Margate R	Canterbury City R
1990–91	Sittingbourne	Faversham Town	Canterbury City R	Fisher Athletic R
1991–92	Herne Bay	Tonbridge AFC	Folkestone Invicta	Folkestone Invicta
1992–93	Tonbridge AFC	Ramsgate	Dover Athletic R.	Tonbridge AFC R
1993–94	Herne Bay	Ramsgate	Dover Athletic R.	Dover Athletic R.
1994–95	Sheppey United	Ramsgate	Thamesmead Town R	Thamesmead Town R
1995–96	Furness	Furness	Hastings Town R	Folkestone Invicta R
1996–97	Herne Bay	Herne Bay	Tonbridge AFC R	Hastings Town R
1997–98	Herne Bay	Greenwich Borough	Sittingbourne R	Thamesmead Town R
Season	Premier Division	Challenge Cup	Reserves Section ('R'=Reserves team)	
Season	Premier Division	Challenge Cup	Division One	Reserves Cup
1998–99	Ramsgate	Deal Town	Deal Town R	Dover Athletic R.
1999–2000	Deal Town	VCD Athletic	Thamesmead Town R (Note: 1999–2000 Division 1: North v South play-off: Thamesmead Town R defeated Deal Town R)	Thamesmead Town R
2000–01	Chatham Town	Ramsgate	Thamesmead Town R	Margate R
2001–02	Maidstone United	Maidstone United	Dover Athletic R (Note: 2001–02 Division 1: North v South play-off: Dartford R 1 – 3 Dover Athletic R)	Dover Athletic R
2002–03	Cray Wanderers	Cray Wanderers	Deal Town R (Note: 2002–03 Division 1: North v South play-off: Cray Wanderers R 2 – 3 Deal Town R)	Cray Wanderers R
Season	Premier Division	Challenge Cup	Reserves Section ('R'=Reserves team)	
Season	Premier Division	Challenge Cup	Division One / Two	Reserves Cup
2003–04	Cray Wanderers	Thamesmead Town	D1: Corinthian	Cray Wanderers R
2003–04	Cray Wanderers	Thamesmead Town	D2: Maidstone United R	Cray Wanderers R
2004–05	Ramsgate	Ramsgate	D1: Erith & Belvedere R	Beckenham Town R
2004–05	Ramsgate	Ramsgate	D2: Whitstable Town R	Beckenham Town R
2005–06	Maidstone United	Maidstone United	D1: Thamesmead Town R	Dartford R
2005–06	Maidstone United	Maidstone United	D2: Folkestone Invicta R	Dartford R
2006–07	Whitstable Town	Thamesmead Town	D1: Thamesmead Town R	Thamesmead Town R
2006–07	Whitstable Town	Thamesmead Town	D2: Chatham Town R	Thamesmead Town R
2007–08	Thamesmead Town	Erith Town	D1: Thamesmead Town R	Ashford Town (Kent) R
2007–08	Thamesmead Town	Erith Town	D2: Dover Athletic R	Ashford Town (Kent) R
2008–09	VCD Athletic	Croydon	D1: Thamesmead Town R	Thamesmead Town R
2008–09	VCD Athletic	Croydon	D2: Holmesdale R	Thamesmead Town R
2009–10	Faversham Town	Herne Bay	D1: Herne Bay R	Dartford R
2009–10	Faversham Town	Herne Bay	D2: Erith Town R	Dartford R
2010–11	Hythe Town	Herne Bay	D1: Cray Wanderers R	Cray Wanderers R
2010–11	Hythe Town	Herne Bay	D2: Faversham Town R	Cray Wanderers R
2011–12	Herne Bay	VCD Athletic	D1: Herne Bay R	Herne Bay R
2011–12	Herne Bay	VCD Athletic	D2: Phoenix Sports R	Herne Bay R
Season	Premier Division	Challenge Cup	Reserves Section ('R'=Reserves team)	
Season	Premier Division	Challenge Cup	Division One	Reserves Cup
2012–13	Erith & Belvedere	Erith & Belvedere	Whitstable Town R	Phoenix Sports R
Southern Counties East Football League
Season	SCEFL	Challenge Cup		
2013–14	Whyteleafe	Beckenham Town		
2014–15	Phoenix Sports	Greenwich Borough		
2015–16	Greenwich Borough	Hollands & Blair		
Season	Premier Division	Challenge Cup	First Division	
2016–17	Ashford United	Ashford United	Glebe	
2017–18	Sevenoaks Town	Whitstable Town	Punjab United	
2018–19	Cray Valley Paper Mills	Chatham Town	Welling Town	
2019–20	Season abandoned			
2020–21	Season curtailed			
2021–22	Sheppey United	Sheppey United	Stansfeld	
2022–23	Erith & Belvedere	Hollands & Blair	Snodland Town	
Season	Premier Division	Challenge Cup	First Division	First Division Cup
2023–24	Deal Town	Erith Town	AFC Whyteleafe	Lewisham Borough
2024–25	Faversham Town	Snodland Town	Faversham Strike Force	Clapton CFC
2025–26	Whitstable Town	Rusthall	AFC Greenwich Borough	Tooting Bec
Sources: FCHD, Southern Counties East League; The FA, Southern Counties East Football League; 1967 Kent Premier Cup Winners; 1968 Kent Premier Cup Winners; SCEFL, League Cup Winners; Kent League, Division Two Winners Kent League, Reserves League Cup 1979–2012
