= Corinthian F.C. (Kent) =

Association football club in England

Coordinates: 51°23′0″N 0°17′38″E

Corinthian
- Full name: Corinthian Football Club
- Nickname: The Hoops
- Founded: 1972
- Ground: Gay Dawn Farm, Fawkham
- Chairman: R. J. Billings
- Manager: Mason East
- League: Southern Counties East League Premier Division
- 2025–26: Southern Counties East League Premier Division, 14th of 19
Home colours	Away colours

Corinthian Football Club is an amateur football club based in Fawkham, near Sevenoaks in Kent, England. They are currently members of the Southern Counties East League Premier Division and play at Gay Dawn Farm.

== History ==
The club was established by Ron Billings Sr in 1972, initially as a youth team for eight and nine-year-olds. The club was named after the original Corinthian, an amateur club in the early twentieth century. They initially played only friendly matches, although they played over 60 games a season and attracted visits from Charlton Athletic, Norwich City and Tottenham Hotspur. They remained without a league until 1985 when a successful application was made to join the semi-professional Southern League. Despite still being an amateur club, Corinthian finished fifth in Division One South in their first season in the league. However, this proved to be their only top-half finish, and after finishing bottom of the division in 1990–91, they were relegated to Division One of the Kent League.

Despite three moderately successful seasons, Corinthian struggled in Division One, and after finishing bottom of the division in 1996–97 and 1997–98, they withdrew from adult football to concentrate on their youth teams. In 2009 the club rejoined the Kent League, taking the place of Slade Green. The league was renamed the Southern Counties East League in 2013. In 2019–20 they reached the semi-finals of the FA Vase, eventually losing 4–3 on penalties to Hebburn Town after a 2–2 draw. At the end of the 2020–21 season the club were promoted to the South East Division of the Isthmian League based on their performances over the two previous seasons, which had been abandoned due to the COVID-19 pandemic. However, they were relegated back to the Premier Division of the Southern Counties East League at the end of the 2022–23 season after finishing bottom of the South East Division.

In 2023–24 Corinthian finished fifth in the Southern Counties East League Premier Division, qualifying for the promotion play-offs. After beating Faversham Town 4–1 on penalties in the semi-finals, they lost the final 4–2 on penalties to Erith Town.

== Ground ==
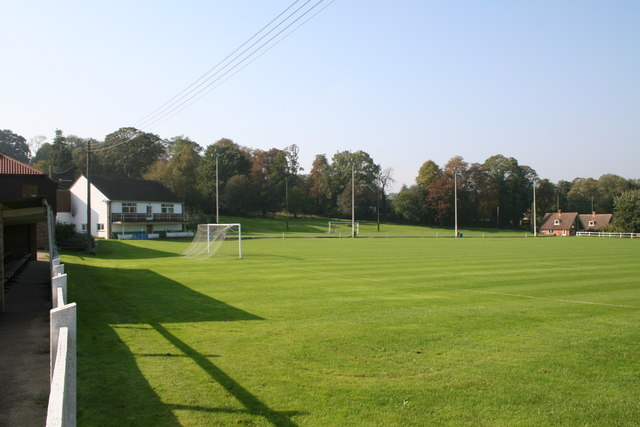
The Gay Dawn Farm ground in 2006

After establishing the club, Billings created a football ground at his Gay Dawn Farm. The farm later became a wider sports complex, featuring golf and footgolf courses. When floodlights were installed Bobby Moore was the guest of honour. A wooden stand with benches is located behind one goal, whilst the two-storey clubhouse has seats on an upper balcony. A new seated stand was built (a converted hay wagon) on one side of the pitch and four small covered areas on the other when the club returned to the Kent League.

== Honours ==
- Southern Counties East League
  - Division One champions 2003–04

== Records ==
- Best FA Cup performance: Second qualifying round, 1993–94, 2020–21, 2024–25
- Best FA Vase performance: Semi-finals, 2019–20

== See also ==
- Corinthian F.C. (Kent) players
