= Lordswood F.C. =

Association football club in England

Coordinates: 51°20′30″N 0°32′49″E

Lordswood
- Full name: Lordswood Football Club
- Nickname: The Lords
- Founded: 1968
- Ground: Martyn Grove, Chatham
- Chairman: Raymond Broad
- Manager: Callum O’Shea
- League: Southern Counties East League Division One
- 2025–26: Southern Counties East League Division One, 4th of 18
Home colours	Away colours

Lordswood Football Club is a football club based in the Lordswood suburb of Chatham, England. They are currently members of the Southern Counties East League Division One and play at Martyn Grove.

== History ==
The club was established in 1968. They joined the Rochester and District League and were promoted in successive seasons to the Premier Division. In 1982 the club moved up to Division Two of the Western Section of the Kent County League. A third-place finish in their first season in the division saw them promoted to Division One. In 1984–85 the club were Division One runners-up, earning promotion to the Premier Division of the Western Section.

Lordswood were Premier Division runners-up in 1986–87 and were promoted to the Senior Division. They were subsequently Senior Division runners-up in 1989–90. Although the club finished bottom of the Senior Division in 1991–92, league reorganisation and a merger of the Eastern and Western sections saw them placed in the Premier Division of the league the following season. They were Premier Division runners-up in 1994–95, before moving up to the Kent League in 1996.

In 2004–05 Lordswood finished bottom of the Kent League. This was repeated in 2009–10, but there was no relegation in either season. In 2013 the league was renamed the Southern Counties East League, and following the addition of a second division in 2016, the club became members of the league's Premier Division. They finished the 2021–22 season in the relegation zone, but were reprieved due to vacancies in divisions above. However, in 2024–25 they finished bottom of the table and were relegated to Division One. The following season saw them finish fourth in Division One, qualifying for the promotion play-offs, going on to lose 4–0 to Rochester United in the semi-finals.

== Ground ==
The club initially played at Cliffe Woods, before moving to Martyn Grove in the 1970s. A clubhouse was built in 1977. The ground has hardstanding on three sides of the pitch and a 123-seat stand on the southern side of the ground.

A record attendance of 600 was set for a friendly match against Gillingham in July 2003 to mark the opening of a new boardroom, with the visitors winning 5–0. That record was then broken in 2024, when a crowd of 745 watched Lordswood face Sittingbourne in an FA Cup qualifying match.

== Records ==
- Best FA Cup performance: Second qualifying round, 2024–25
- Best FA Vase performance: Fourth round, 2012–13
- Record attendance: 745 vs Sittingbourne, FA Cup second qualifying round, 14 September 2024
- Biggest win: 7–0 vs Erith Town
- Heaviest defeat: 9–0 vs Rochester United, Southern Counties East League Division One, 23 September 2025

== See also ==
- Lordswood F.C. players
- Lordswood F.C. managers
