= Slade Green F.C. =

Coordinates: 51°28′06.88″N 0°11′41.96″E

Slade Green
- Full name: Slade Green Football Club
- Nickname(s): The Green
- Founded: 1946 (as Slade Green Athletic)
- Dissolved: 2009
- Ground: Small Glen; Erith
- Capacity: 3,000 (150 seated)
- 2008–09: Kent League; Premier Division, 13th
Home colours

Slade Green F.C. was a football club based in Slade Green in the London Borough of Bexley, England. They were established in 1946 and played in the Kent League from 1970 until 2009 when the club folded.

== History ==
Prior to World War II, Slade Green was represented by three clubs: The Wasps, St Augustines and Southern Railway Sports. On 6 June 1946 a meeting was held at the Railway Hotel at which these three clubs merged to form Slade Green Athletic FC (renamed Slade Green FC in 1986).

In 1952, The Green joined the Kent Amateur League and were the Division Two champions in their first season, followed by winning Division One the following season without losing a match.

In the 1960–61 season Green were Senior Division Champions and shortly afterwards they were elected to the Greater London League. After finishing as Greater London League runners-up in 1969, they stepped up to the Kent League, where the club remained until 2009 when it announced its withdrawal from the league with immediate effect.

The club folded in 2009 and resigned from the Kent Football League.

== Ground ==
Since its foundation The Green have played on a small patch of land adjacent to the Erith marshes, originally named simply The Glen. In 1987 the 'Small' prefix was added, honouring Charlie and Gert Small who had been involved with the club since its earliest days.

The ground boasts an elevated car park and well-appointed clubhouse, with shelter for the fans being provided by a large if basic concrete structure on one side of the pitch with a large sloping roof. The remainder of the ground is undeveloped, save for hard standing and floodlights.

The club plans to install permanent seating, something they had been reluctant to do previously due to high levels of vandalism at the ground. Fortunately they were able to secure a grant to install a perimeter fence, which has eliminated this problem.

Club owners objected to Bexley Council's suggestion of building a new stadium alongside the railway station with community facilities, which would be funded by the football foundation and through the sale of the existing grounds.

== Records ==
- Best league position: 6th in Kent League Division One (now Premier Division) 1995–96
- Best FA Cup performance: 2nd qualifying round, 1992–93
- Best FA Vase performance: 3rd round 1990–91 and 1995–96
