= Erith Town F.C. =

Association football club in England

Coordinates: 51.4190°N 0.1100°E

Erith Town
- Full name: Erith Town Football Club
- Nickname: The Dockers
- Founded: 1959
- Ground: Bayliss Avenue, Thamesmead
- Chair: Kevin Morris
- Manager: Aaron Jeffery
- League: Isthmian League South East Division
- 2025–26: Isthmian League South East Division, 16th of 22
| Home colours | Away colours |

Erith Town Football Club is a football club based in Thamesmead in South East London, England. They are currently members of the Isthmian League South East Division and play at Bayliss Avenue.

== History ==
The club was established in 1959 as a Sunday league club under the name Woolwich Town. They initially played in the Metropolitan Sunday League and were Senior Section champions in 1965–66, 1970–71 and 1974–75. In 1989 the club was renamed Woolwich Heathway, but reverted to their original name within a year. In 1991 they began playing Saturday football, joining Division Two of the Spartan League. Despite only finishing ninth in their first season in Division Two, the club were promoted to Division One due to league restructuring. In 1994–95 they finished second in Division One, earning promotion to the Premier Division.

In 1996 Woolwich transferred to the Kent League, and at the end of the 1996–97 season were renamed Erith Town due to their move to the Erith Stadium. They won the Kent League's Premier Division Cup in 2007–08, beating Hythe Town 1–0 in the final. The club reached the final again the following season, losing 3–1 on penalties to Croydon after a 1–1 draw. A proposed merger with Dartford Town in the summer of 2010 was abandoned, and the club went on to win the Kent Senior Trophy in 2010–11 with a 3–1 win over Tunbridge Wells in the final. In 2013 the league was renamed the Southern Counties East League. In 2023–24 they won the League Challenge Cup, beating Corinthian 5–3 on penalties after a 1–1 draw, as well as winning the Kent Senior Trophy for the second time with a 3–2 win against Croydon in the final. The club went on to finish league season in fourth place, qualifying for the promotion play-offs. After beating Glebe 2–1 in the semi-finals, they defeated Corinthian on penalties in the final to earn promotion to the South East Division of the Isthmian League.

== Ground ==
During the club's time in Sunday league they played at the Woolwich Barracks Stadium. When they joined the Spartan League, they moved to Greenwich Borough's Harrow Meadow ground. In October 1995 they moved to the Erith Sports Stadium, an athletics stadium. They temporarily returned to Harrow Meadow during the 1998–99 season whilst the Erith Sports Stadium was renovated.

In 2008 the club began groundsharing at Thamesmead Town's Bayliss Avenue, before returning to the Erith Sports Stadium the following season. In 2013 they moved to Cray Valley PM's Badgers Sports Ground in Eltham. In 2016 they returned to the Borough of Bexley, moving to VCD Athletic's Oakwood ground. The club moved back to the Erith Sports Stadium in 2018. They returned to Thamesmead in June 2023 for the following two seasons.

== Honours ==
- Southern Counties East League
  - Premier Division Cup winners 2007–08
  - Challenge Cup winners 2023–24
- London Metropolitan Sunday League
  - Senior Section champions 1965–66, 1970–71, 1974–75
- Kent Senior Trophy
  - Winners 2010–11, 2023–24

== Records ==
- Best FA Cup performance: Second qualifying round, 2004–05, 2007–08, 2010–11, 2011–12
- Best FA Trophy performance: First round, 2026–27
- Best FA Vase performance: Fourth round, 2022–23, 2023–24
- Record attendance: 671 vs Corinthian, Southern Counties East League Premier Division play-off final, 6 April 2024
- Biggest victory: 9–0 vs Sporting Bengal United, 15 January 2011
- Most appearances: Alan Hanlon, 363
- Most goals: Steadman Callender, 100

== See also ==
- Erith Town F.C. players
