= Kent County Football Association =

Area sporting organization with 19th century origins

- Abbreviation: Kent FA
- Formation: 1881
- Registration no.: 04088537
- Legal status: Private limited company (limited by guarantee)
- Purpose: Football association
- Headquarters: Invicta House; Cobdown Park; London Road; Ditton
- Location(s): Aylesford Kent ME20 6DQ
- Coordinates: 51.301297°N 0.455345°E
- President: Barry Bright
- Chair: Denise Richmond
- Chief executive officer: Darryl Haden
- Affiliations: The Football Association
- Revenue: £1.45m GBP (2024)
- Staff: 38 (2024)
- Website: www.kentfa.com

The Kent County Football Association, now known as Kent FA, is the governing body of football in the county of Kent, England. It was formed in 1881 and has governed the game of football, under the aegis of The Football Association (FA), since that date. The Kent FA controls, manages, regulates and promotes the game and its development at all levels within the County. The association operates 25 County Cups for its affiliated clubs at different age groups (from youth to veteran) and levels for both men and women.

== History ==
An attempt was made in 1875 to form a football association in Kent but it was not until 1881 that the Kent County Football Association (KCFA) was formed by friends Mr George Prall (who became the treasurer) and Mr Morton Betts (the secretary). Three years later at a meeting initiated by Betts, held at The Oval on 16 January 1884, the association was revitalised with Lord Harris appointed as President and Mr Frederick Sewell and Prall elected to the honorary positions of secretary and treasurer respectively. Sewell resigned the following year and was replaced as secretary by Mr Edmund Charrington. In addition to ensuring the FA's and its own rules concerning players, clubs and matches were adhered to the KCFA also was involved in selecting and arranging inter-county matches for the Kent County team. From the 1885–86 season the association instigated the County Badge knock-out competition (the badge comprised a scarlet armlet with a silver Kentish horse on it). At a meeting of the association in late 1887, with Betts restored as secretary, both the rules for a Challenge Cup competition (known as the Kent Cup) to replace the Badge competition were agreed as were the bye-laws of the association: these included defining the administrative and management structure which included a committee comprising the association's officers (president, vice presidents, treasurer and secretary) together with twenty members chosen equally from four divisional (regional) committees with everyone to be elected at one of the two annual general meetings of the association, to which each member club could sent two representatives; these early bye-laws also stated that the association badge was to be a white horse on a blue shield. Two years later in 1889 another cup competition, the Junior Trophy, for junior status clubs was begun. Secretary Betts did not attend the association's general meeting in 1889 and in the ensuing vote of officers Mr Alfred Kennedy was elected as his replacement. Three years later in September 1892 owing to ill-health Kennedy resigned as secretary and Mr Peter Leckie was elected to the post.

At the half-yearly meeting of the KCFA in March 1894 two important topics were discussed: firstly a proposal to allow professionalism was rejected and secondly the structure for the newly formed Kent League (which was to operate under the control of the association) was approved with the Kent Cup trophy awarded to the league champions (with the challenge cup competition itself cancelled). Later the same year it was reported that the association's membership comprised at least 130 clubs. In January 1895 the association voted once again on the subject of professionalism and in a reverse of their decision nine months previously, voted by a significant majority of 68 votes to 14 to accept the principle. Two months later the organisation expanded its competitions to include one for boys aged under seventeen. Later in 1895 at a lively general meeting secretary Leckie failed to provide a firm financial statement – estimating the association to be up to £100 in debt – and subsequently he was not re-elected, with Mr James Albert overwhelmingly voted to the role; at the same meeting Prall, treasurer for the past fourteen years, resigned and Mr James Grant was elected unopposed to the post and Mr William Savage was elected as the first permanent chairman of the association.

The new secretary Albert served for eleven years until 1906, events during his tenure included: in March 1897 the reinstatement of the Challenge Cup competition, retitled the Kent Senior Cup with its original trophy restored – consequently the Kent League Division Two champions shield trophy was henceforth awarded to the Division One champions; prior to the start of the Kent League season in August 1898 the KCFA ceded the management of the competition to the clubs involved; in May 1901, per an FA initiative, referees were brought under the rule of the association; in June 1905 a Minor challenge competition for amateur clubs was instigated, for which the 'Croneen Shield' was provided for the winners.

In October 1905, secretary Albert, who had reported four months previously that 252 clubs and 133 referees were affiliated to the KCFA, tendered his resignation citing the volume of work as the factor. Additionally at the same meeting an age limit of twenty or less was placed on players competing for the Junior Cup. As a consequence of the reason for Albert's resignation the post of secretary was changed from an honorary position to a full-time paid role with a proposed salary of £80 per annum with the added proviso that the new incumbent was to be resident in Chatham (where the KCFA offices were located)

At the 1906 annual meeting, at which his replacement Mr Frank Lockwood was introduced, secretary Albert in his final report advised that 41 cups and leagues were under the control of the association and that affiliations had risen to 290 clubs and 220 referees. Also at the meeting it was decided to rename the Minor Cup to the Kent Amateur Cup to better reflect its status. In 1908 there was a growing schism between the amateur and professional ranks of the game and Lord Harris the hitherto President of the KCFA was deemed to have rendered his re-election an impossibility when he accepted a similar position with the Kent Amateur Football Association; consequently a new KCFA President, Colonel Frank Griffith, was voted to the role in his place. In 1909 after eleven seasons under control of its member clubs the management of the Kent League reverted to the KCFA (under a designated committee); also the association's cup competitions were expanded to include a mid-week cup competition and four new cups were presented to the association by the new president Colonel Griffith – these to be presented to the winners of each of the four regional junior divisions (per the KCFA sub-divisions of the county) with each winner going on to contest the Junior Cup. The following year, in a significant move for the welfare of its individual members, the KCFA Benevolent Fund was founded. A further two cups were added to the association's portfolio in 1911: the Kent Senior Shield, an invitational knock-out competition for between eight and twelve teams with a trophy donated by MP for Gravesend, Sir Gilbert Parker for the winners; and, following the abolition of the now under twenty-one age limit for the Junior Cup, a new Minor Cup for younger players was sanctioned. In September 1913 the association was rocked by the death aged 48, following an operation for appendicitis, of secretary Lockwood; he was replaced on a temporary basis by Mr Fred Collins. Several weeks later in late October 1913 Mr James Rigden was appointed secretary.

At the June 1914 Annual General Meeting it was reported that after long negotiations there had been a rapprochement with the Kent Amateur Football Association and it was no longer in opposition to the KCFA and had accepted seats on its council. Three months later, owing to the outbreak of World War I, the association suspended all the competitions under its control; it was subsequently reported that at this time there had been 50 leagues and 502 clubs affiliated to the KCFA. The association restored its competitions in 1919 and at their meeting in 1920 the secretary, now Captain Rigden, advised that 43 leagues and 404 clubs were affiliated. Within a year the affiliations had risen above the pre-war levels to 57 leagues and competitions and 588 clubs.

Captain Rigden resigned the secretaryship in September 1926; the position was advertised at a salary of £250 and in due course Stanley Brown was elected to the post. Shortly afterwards the association relocated their offices within Chatham to Military Road. In 1932 the association added a further cup with the introduction of the Group B Junior Cup, with the existing Junior Cup designated as Group A; the new competition was to allow for the differing playing strengths and achievements of the clubs at Junior level with strict rules in place to allocate and keep separate the clubs and players of each group. The concept was extended further the following year with a Group C Junior Cup added. In 1935 in response to an FA initiative the KCFA put into operation a coaching scheme for boys in the county's secondary schools. At the association's annual meeting of 1935 secretary Brown reported there were 1,410 affiliations comprising 96 leagues and competitions, 761 clubs and 553 referees. Following the outbreak of World War II the KCFA announced in September 1939 that limited football would continue, mainly where possible for junior and minor status matches, with the Kent League suspended (albeit a regional wartime league was played in the 1939–1940 season).

In early 1942 the KCFA re-opened its offices and restarted the Kent Senior Cup competition and the Kent League was revived in 1944. The association decided in 1947 to purchase a freehold property in Chatham to establish a permanent headquarters and subsequently 69 Maidstone Road, Chatham was acquired. At the KCFA general meeting in 1951 secretary Brown reported that membership figures had reached record highs of 112 leagues and competitions, 981 clubs and 708 referees. The following year a further KCFA cup competition, the Intermediate Cup, for reserve sides of senior status clubs was announced.

In December 1958, sixty-five years since its formation by the association and fifty years since it had returned to control by the KCFA, it was decided to disband the Kent League as many of the member clubs had resigned in order to defect to the Southern League. There followed several seasons of stagnation in affiliations until the early 1960s when a surge occurred owing to a directive from the FA that clubs playing on Sundays must be affiliated to a registered organisation; in 1966 it was reported the membership comprised 165 leagues and competitions and more than one thousand clubs. During 1964 secretary Brown announced that after thirty-eight years in post he was to retire. He was replaced by Richard Speake, an appointment for the first occasion of a county outsider.

In the early 1970s there were two significant changes to the participants of the game determined by the FA: firstly in 1970 the FA recognised women's teams which the KCFA had already agreed would be accepted for affiliation, and secondly in 1974 amateur status was abolished and as a consequence the Kent Amateur Cup competition was discontinued with a new competition known as the Kent Senior Trophy introduced (for senior status clubs that were playing at a level below that eligible for the FA Trophy). In 1978, after fourteen years as secretary, Speake retired and was replaced by Keith Masters. An additional cup competition commenced in 1985, known as the Intermediate Challenge Shield it was created for intermediate status clubs who were now ineligible for the KCFA Junior Cup competitions.

In October 2000 there was a change in the status of the association when it registered as a limited company and became the 'Kent County Football Association Limited', a private company limited by guarantee without share capital, registration number 04088537. Following the incorporation the association's secretary adopted the title Chief Executive Officer (CEO). In 2009 after 62 years of being headquartered in Chatham the association relocated to premises developed for them at Cobdown, Ditton, near Aylesford. Shortly after the move CEO Masters retired in 2010 and was succeeded from January 2011 by Paul Dolan who was instrumental in rebranding the organisation away from the KCFA to the Kent FA. He subsequently left in 2018 to join the Football Association and was replaced as CEO by Darryl Haden. In 2020 the Kent FA appointed a female to the position of chair of the organisation for the first time with Denise Richmond taking the role.

In 2024 the Kent FA introduced a revised governance structure establishing the Board of Directors as the ultimate decision making body with both the Council and Youth Council becoming consultative bodies with seven Football Delivery Working Groups established to support them across key strategic areas.

== Organisation ==
The core missions of the Kent FA are stated as being to Safeguard, Govern, Protect and Develop football across Kent. It seeks to help shape and support the administration of clubs and leagues and influence the development of players, coaches, match officials, and volunteers and the overall culture of the game.

Following a 2024 revamp of the organisational governance structure the Kent FA Board of Directors, with a composition of one-third elected from Kent FA Council and two-thirds independent, are the ultimate decision-making body of the organisation. Both the Kent FA Council and Youth Council act as consultative bodies to the board. The Kent FA Council comprises representatives from: all Kent FA-sanctioned leagues, various levels of the National League System, different tiers of the women's football pyramid, Kent Schools FA, higher education, the Kent FA Youth Council, Kent FA registered referees and players actively participating in football across Kent. All the council members are elected for a three year term, with a maximum service period of nine years.

The structure is completed by Seven Football Delivery Working Groups which support the executive staff and cover the key strategic areas of: the male pathway, the female pathway, the disability pathway, referees, competitions, facilities, and investment. These groups are not restricted to Kent FA Council members but seek to include people directly involved with the game in Kent and aim to ensure that the Kent FA reflects the needs of the football community and where appropriate they may be modified to react to any changes. They are linked to the 2024–2028 Kent FA Strategy of Play-Protect-Promote which is relatable to the key performance indicators set by and agreed with the FA.

In 2025 the Kent FA had nine board members including five who were independent non-executive directors. It employs over twenty members of staff in managerial and lead roles to both run the organisation and administer and support all aspects of football in Kent.

In its 'Kent FA Strategy 2024–2028' document the Kent FA reported its activities covered 25 Kent cup competitions, 32 sanctioned leagues, 757 clubs (comprising 4,302 teams), 69,339 players and 1,764 match officials.

=== Key officer appointments ===
President	Chairman / Chair	Secretary / Chief Executive Officer	Treasurer / Finance Officer / Financial Director
-	-	Morton Betts; 1881–1884	George Prall; 1881–1895
Lord Harris; 1884––1908	-	Frederick Sewell; 1884–1885	George Prall; 1881–1895
Lord Harris; 1884––1908	-	Edmund Charrington; 1885-1886	George Prall; 1881–1895
Lord Harris; 1884––1908	-	Morton Betts; 1886–1889	George Prall; 1881–1895
Lord Harris; 1884––1908	-	Alfred Kennedy; 1889–1892	George Prall; 1881–1895
Lord Harris; 1884––1908	-	Peter Leckie; 1892–1895	George Prall; 1881–1895
Lord Harris; 1884––1908	William Savage; 1895–1895	James Albert; 1895–1906	James Grant; 1895–1906
Lord Harris; 1884––1908	Thomas King-Warhurst; 1895–1899	James Albert; 1895–1906	James Grant; 1895–1906
Lord Harris; 1884––1908	William Savage; 1899–1901	James Albert; 1895–1906	James Grant; 1895–1906
Lord Harris; 1884––1908	Horace Porter; 1902–1931	James Albert; 1895–1906	James Grant; 1895–1906
Lord Harris; 1884––1908	Horace Porter; 1902–1931	Frank Lockwood; 1906–1913	Joseph Lingham; 1906–1912
Colonel Frank Griffith; 1908–1917	Horace Porter; 1902–1931	Frank Lockwood; 1906–1913	Joseph Lingham; 1906–1912
Colonel Frank Griffith; 1908–1917	Horace Porter; 1902–1931	Frank Lockwood; 1906–1913	Sam Sargeant; 1912–1920
Colonel Frank Griffith; 1908–1917	Horace Porter; 1902–1931	Fred Collins; 1913	Sam Sargeant; 1912–1920
Colonel Frank Griffith; 1908–1917	Horace Porter; 1902–1931	Captain James Rigden; 1913–1926	Sam Sargeant; 1912–1920
Frank Fehr; 1920–1930	Horace Porter; 1902–1931	Captain James Rigden; 1913–1926	Captain Arthur Lewis; 1920–1925
Frank Fehr; 1920–1930	Horace Porter; 1902–1931	Captain James Rigden; 1913–1926	Herbert Geddes; 1925–1954
Frank Fehr; 1920–1930	Horace Porter; 1902–1931	Stanley Brown; 1926–1964	Herbert Geddes; 1925–1954
Joseph Lingham; 1930–1943	Horace Porter; 1902–1931	Stanley Brown; 1926–1964	Herbert Geddes; 1925–1954
Joseph Lingham; 1930–1943	William Rule; 1931–1949	Stanley Brown; 1926–1964	Herbert Geddes; 1925–1954
Frank Fehr; 1944–1948	William Rule; 1931–1949	Stanley Brown; 1926–1964	Herbert Geddes; 1925–1954
William Rule; 1948–1949	William Rule; 1931–1949	Stanley Brown; 1926–1964	Herbert Geddes; 1925–1954
Brigadier Sir Harry Mackeson; 1949–1964	Reginald Rule; 1949–1964	Stanley Brown; 1926–1964	Herbert Geddes; 1925–1954
Brigadier Sir Harry Mackeson; 1949–1964	Reginald Rule; 1949–1964	Stanley Brown; 1926–1964	Percy Turner; 1954–1973
Reginald Rule; 1964	Eddie Butcher; 1964–1976	Richard Speake; 1964–1978	Percy Turner; 1954–1973
Michael Gliksten; 1965–1976	Eddie Butcher; 1964–1976	Richard Speake; 1964–1978	Percy Turner; 1954–1973
Michael Gliksten; 1965–1976	Eddie Butcher; 1964–1976	Richard Speake; 1964–1978	Don Rawlins; 1973–1979
Eddie Butcher; 1976–1985	Joe Blackburn; 1976–1983	Richard Speake; 1964–1978	Don Rawlins; 1973–1979
Eddie Butcher; 1976–1985	Joe Blackburn; 1976–1983	Keith Masters; 1978–2010	Don Rawlins; 1973–1979
Eddie Butcher; 1976–1985	Joe Blackburn; 1976–1983	Keith Masters; 1978–2010	Herbert Capps; 1979–1992
Eddie Butcher; 1976–1985	Barry Bright; 1983–2017	Keith Masters; 1978–2010	Herbert Capps; 1979–1992
Ernie Bennett; 1985–2002	Barry Bright; 1983–2017	Keith Masters; 1978–2010	Herbert Capps; 1979–1992
Ernie Bennett; 1985–2002	Barry Bright; 1983–2017	Keith Masters; 1978–2010	John Bellamy; 1992–2002
Norman Chatfield; 2002–2009	Barry Bright; 1983–2017	Keith Masters; 1978–2010	Peter Enright; 2002–2013
Colin Boswell; 2009–2020	Barry Bright; 1983–2017	Keith Masters; 1978–2010	Peter Enright; 2002–2013
Colin Boswell; 2009–2020	Barry Bright; 1983–2017	Paul Dolan; 2011–2018	Peter Enright; 2002–2013
Colin Boswell; 2009–2020	Barry Bright; 1983–2017	Paul Dolan; 2011–2018	Malcolm McLean; 2013–2019
Colin Boswell; 2009–2020	Phil Smith; 2017–2020	Paul Dolan; 2011–2018	Malcolm McLean; 2013–2019
Colin Boswell; 2009–2020	Phil Smith; 2017–2020	Darryl Haden; 2018–current	Malcolm McLean; 2013–2019
Colin Boswell; 2009–2020	Phil Smith; 2017–2020	Darryl Haden; 2018–current	Lee Dyson; 2019–current
Barry Bright; 2020–current	Denise Richmond; 2020–current	Darryl Haden; 2018–current	Lee Dyson; 2019–current

== Affiliated leagues ==
=== Senior leagues ===
- Southern Counties East Football League
- Kent County Football League†

† NLS regional feeder league

=== Adult male Saturday leagues ===
- Ashford and District League
- Bromley and South London Football League
- Canterbury and District League
- Rochester and District League
- Sevenoaks and District League

=== Men's Sunday leagues ===
- Ashford and District Sunday League
- Dover Sunday League
- Herne Bay and Whitstable Sunday League
- Maidstone and Mid Kent Sunday League
- Medway Area Sunday League
- North Kent Sunday League
- Orpington and Bromley District Sunday League
- Sheppey Sunday League
- Thanet Sunday League
- West Kent Sunday League

=== Women and girls leagues ===
- Kent Girls/Ladies League
- South East Counties Women's League
- Kent FA Women's Casual League (30+)

=== Veterans leagues ===
- Kent County Veterans Football League
- Thanet and District Veterans League
- Kent Masters Conference (45+)

=== Youth leagues ===
- Ashford and District Youth League
- East Kent Youth League
- Faversham and District youth League
- Kent Youth League
- Maidstone Boys Primary League
- Maidstone Invicta Primary League
- Maidstone Minor League
- Medway District Youth League
- North Kent Youth League

=== Other leagues ===
- Kent Disability League
- Kent FA Walking Football League
- Kent Women's Walking Football League
- Kent Futsal League

Source: "County Leagues". Kent County FA.

=== Disbanded or amalgamated leagues ===
Previously affiliated leagues that have been disbanded or amalgamated include:

- Beckenham League
- Bromley and District Football League
- Dartford and District League
- Deal and District Sunday League
- Dover League
- East Kent League
- Folkestone Junior League
- Gravesend League
- Hythe, Folkestone and District Sunday League
- Maidstone and District League
- New Brompton League
- North East Kent League
- South London Football Alliance
- Southern Suburban League
- Thames and Medway Combination
- Thanet Works League
- Tonbridge and District League
- Tunbridge Wells League
- Weald of Kent League
- West Kent League

== Kent County Cups ==
=== Kent Senior and Intermediate competitions ===
- Kent Senior Cup: A competition dating from 1887 (when it was known as the Kent Cup) which accepts clubs affiliated to the Kent FA playing at Step 4 and above of the National League System (including Football League Clubs). Additionally the current holder of the Kent Senior Trophy is invited to participate.
- Kent Senior Trophy: Originating in 1974 this is for Kent FA affiliated teams at Steps 5 and 6 of the National League System, from the Southern Counties East and Southern Amateur Leagues.
- Kent Intermediate Cup: Instigated in 1952 now for the reserves, U23, U21 and U19 teams who play in the Southern Counties East League, Kent County League or equivalent level and whose First Team competes in the Kent Senior Cup or Senior Trophy.
- Kent Intermediate Challenge Shield: Dating from 1985 this is currently contested between teams from the Premier Division and Division One level of the Kent County Football League. Additionally the current holder of the Kent Junior Cup 'A' are entered into the competition. Teams affiliated to London FA and Surrey FA can apply to enter.

==== Winners (since 2002–03) ====
Season	Kent Senior Cup	Kent Senior Trophy	Kent Intermediate Cup	Kent Intermediate Challenge Shield
2002–03	Margate	Maidstone United	Deal Town Reserves	Sheerness East
2003–04	Margate	Cray Wanderers	Cray; Wanderers Reserves	Stansfeld (O & B) Club
2004–05	Margate	Thamesmead Town	Dover Athletic Reserves	Cray Valley; Paper Mills
2005–06	Bromley	VCD Athletic	Tonbridge; Angels Reserves	Hollands & Blair
2006–07	Bromley	Whitstable Town	Deal Town Reserves	Stansfeld (O & B) Club
2007–08	Ebbsfleet United	Thamesmead Town	Tonbridge; Angels Reserves	Orpington
2008–09	Welling United	VCD Athletic	Tonbridge; Angels Reserves	Hollands & Blair
2009–10	Sittingbourne	Faversham Town	Dartford Reserves	Phoenix Sports
2010–11	Dartford	Erith Town	Deal Town Reserves	Hollands & Blair
2011–12	Hythe Town	Hollands & Blair	Tonbridge; Angels Reserves	Sutton Athletic
2012–13	Charlton Athletic	Tunbridge Wells	Tonbridge; Angels Reserves	Greenways
2013–14	Ebbsfleet United	Beckenham Town	Hollands & Blair Reserves	Sheppey & Sheerness United
2014–15	Charlton Athletic	Greenwich Borough	Faversham; Town Reserves	Metrogas
2015–16	Dartford	Sheppey United	Greenwich; Borough Reserves	Stansfeld (O & B) Club
2016–17	Dover Athletic	Ashford United	Hollands & Blair Reserves	Punjab United
2017–18	Maidstone United	Whitstable Town	West Wickham Reserves	St Peter (Jersey)
2018–19	Maidstone United	Chatham Town	Rusthall Reserves	South East Athletic
2019–20	Dartford	Sheppey United	Lordswood Reserves	Farnborough; Old Boys Guild
2019–20	Finals carried over to 2021 and 2022			
2020–21	Competition suspended owing to COVID 19 pandemic.			
2021–22	Dartford	Sheppey United	Margate U23s	Kings Hill
2022–23	Margate	Punjab United	Deal Town Reserves	Red Velvet
2023–24	Maidstone United	Erith Town	Deal Town Reserves	Minster
2024–25	Welling United	Larkfield & New; Hythe Wanderers	Stansfeld (O & B); Club U23s	Metrogas
2025–26	Maidstone United	Whitstable Town	Hollands & Blair U23	AMG Ballerz

"Kent County Football Association Ltd – Official Handbook 2010–11: p.168" (PDF). Kent County FA. Archived from the original (PDF) on 21 July 2011.
"List of Previous Kent Cup Winners" (PDF). Kent County FA.
"County Cups 2014/15". Kent County FA. Archived from the original on 4 March 2016.
"County Cups 2015/16". Kent County FA. Archived from the original on 8 April 2016.
"Results April & May 2017". Kentish Football.
"Kent County Cups: Previous Results". Kent County FA.

=== Kent County Junior Cups ===
The Junior Cup competitions are open to clubs affiliated to the Kent FA that participate in a recognised grassroots league. Originally a single Junior Cup was competed for in 1889 with a 'B' cup introduced in 1932 and a 'C' version the following season. The junior status teams are divided at the discretion of the divisional committees into either the 'A', 'B' or 'C' divisions on the basis of their playing strengths and achievements, subject to: the current holder of the Junior 'A' Cup is automatically placed in the Kent Intermediate Challenge Shield competition; the current holders of the Junior 'B' and 'C' cups are placed respectively in the 'A' and 'B' competitions; the Reserve teams of clubs playing in the Kent Intermediate Challenge Shield together with clubs competing at the Division Two level of the Kent County League will be placed in the 'A' section; clubs at Division Three level of the Kent County League are placed per the committees decision. The Cup is also open to clubs in neighbouring Counties to apply to enter.

==== Winners (since 2002–03) ====
Season	Kent Junior Cup 'A'	Kent Junior Cup 'B'	Kent Junior Cup 'C'
2002–03	180	Newington	River Sports
2003–04	Hollands & Blair	Emerald Star	Parkhurst Rangers
2004–05	New Ash Green	Phoenix Sports	The George
2005–06	The Rose	Beaverwood	Ravens
2006–07	Tonbridge Invicta	Sutton Athletic	Yalding
2007–08	Canterbury City	Cannon 24	Charlton Community
2008–09	Gillingham Green	Charlton; Athletic Community	Folkestone Lantern
2009–10	Swale United	Insulators	Ashford; International S & S
2010–11	Hollands & Blair Reserves	Stockbury Athletic	Woodnesborough
2011–12	Gillingham Green	Three Crutches	Aylesford Reserves
2012–13	Faversham Harlequin	Parkwood Community; Association	Snodland Town; Reserves
2013–14	East Kent College	Southmere	AFC Margate
2014–15	Welling Park	AEI Sports	Willesborough Athletic
2015–16	Burgess Hodgson	Social Team	Kingsdale
2016–17	Willesborough Athletic	Red Arrow	Red Velvet
2017–18	Welling Town	Minster	High Halstow
2018–19	Red Velvet	Red Velvet A	Gillingham Green
2019–20	Greenways Aces	The Bull	Selhurst SA
2019–20	Finals carried over to 2021 and 2022		
2020–21	Competition suspended owing to COVID 19 pandemic.		
2021–22	Medway City	Selhurst SA	Grand Sports Club
2022–23	Littlebourne	Kemsing United	Bocca Juniors
2023–24	Aylesford	Tunbridge; Wells Foresters	Streatham
2024–25	Revo	Old Roan	West Wickham; Fourth
2025–26	Smeeth & Brabourne	Roselands	Ellis Athletic

"Kent County Football Association Ltd – Official Handbook 2010–11: p.168" (PDF). Kent County FA. Archived from the original (PDF) on 21 July 2011.
"County Cups 2014/15". Kent County FA. Archived from the original on 4 March 2016.
"County Cups 2015/16". Kent County FA. Archived from the original on 8 April 2016.
"Results April & May 2017". Kentish Football.
"Kent County Cups: Previous Results". Kent County FA.

=== Kent Women's and Veterans Cups ===
- Kent Women's Cup: The competition is open to all Kent FA affiliated teams that compete in the Professional Academy Game League, Tiers 6 and above in the Women's League Pyramid.
- Kent Women's Plate: Features all Kent FA affiliated teams that compete at Tier 7 and below in the Women's League Pyramid.
- Kent Veterans' Cup: The competition is open to all Kent FA affiliated Veterans teams, additionally teams affiliated in London can apply to enter.

==== Winners (since 2002–03) ====
Season	Kent Women's Cup	Kent Women's Plate	Kent Veterans Cup
2002–03	Charlton Athletic		
2003–04	Charlton Athletic		
2004–05	Millwall Lionesses		
2005–06	Charlton Athletic		
2006–07	Millwall Lionesses		
2007–08	Millwall Lionesses		
2008–09	Charlton Athletic		
2009–10	Gillingham		
2010–11	Charlton Athletic	Gillingham	
2011–12	Gillingham	Long Lane	
2012–13	Gillingham	Herne Bay	Phoenix Sports
2013–14	Gillingham	Herne Bay	Phoenix Sports
2014–15	Gillingham	Bromley	Tankerton
2015–16	London Corinthian	Swale	Crayford One Bell
2016–17	Gillingham	Maidstone United	Crayford One Bell
2017–18	Kent Football	Bromley	Crayford One Bell
2018–19	Gillingham	Maidstone United	Crayford One Bell
2019–20	Dartford	Glebe	Crayford One Bell
2019–20	Finals carried over to 2021 and 2022		
2020–21	Competition suspended owing to COVID 19 pandemic.		
2021–22	Chatham Town	Herne Bay	Metrogas
2022–23	Chatham Town	Sittingbourne	Glebe
2023–24	Dartford	Tunbridge Wells Foresters	The Charcoal
2024–25	Chatham Town	Tonbridge Angels	Metrogas
2025–26	Dartford	Maidstone United	Aylesford

"Kent County Football Association Ltd – Official Handbook 2010–11: p.168" (PDF). Kent County FA. Archived from the original (PDF) on 21 July 2011.
"List of Previous Kent Cup Winners" (PDF). Kent County FA.
"County Cups 2014/15". Kent County FA. Archived from the original on 4 March 2016.
"County Cups 2015/16". Kent County FA. Archived from the original on 8 April 2016.
"Results April & May 2017". Kentish Football.
"Kent County Cups: Previous Results". Kent County FA.

=== Kent Sunday, Girls Youth and Boys Youth cups ===
- Kent Sunday Cups
  - Sunday Premier Cup
  - Sunday Junior Cup
  - Sunday Junior Trophy
- Kent Girls Youth Cups
  - Under 16 Girls Youth Cup
  - Under 15 Girls Youth Cup
  - Under 14 Girls Youth Cup
  - Under 13 Girls Youth Cup
- Kent Boys Youth Cups
  - Under 18 Boys Youth Cup
  - Under 16 Boys Youth Cup
  - Under 15 Boys Youth Cup
  - Under 15 Boys Youth Plate
  - Under 14 Boys Youth Cup
  - Under 14 Boys Youth Plate
  - Under 13 Boys Youth Cup
  - Under 13 Boys Youth Plate

Source: "Kent County Cups". Kent County FA.

== Affiliated member clubs ==
Among the clubs that are (or were) affiliated to the Kent County FA are:

- Alma Swanley (defunct)
- Ashford United
- Beckenham Town
- Bexley United (defunct)
- Bexleyheath & Welling (defunct)
- Brett Sports (defunct)
- Bromley
- Canterbury City
- Charlton Athletic
- Chatham Town
- Cray Valley Paper Mills
- Cray Wanderers
- Crockenhill
- Corinthian
- Dartford
- Deal Town
- Dover (defunct)
- Dover Athletic
- Ebbsfleet United+
- Erith & Belvedere
- Erith Town
- Faversham Town
- Fisher
- Folkestone Invicta
- Folkestone Town (defunct)
- Gillingham
- Gravesend United++
- Gravesend & Northfleet+
- Greenwich Borough
- Herne Bay
- Hollands & Blair
- Holmesdale
- Hythe Town
- Larkfield & New Hythe Wanderers
- Lordswood
- Maidstone United (1897–1922) (defunct)
- Maidstone United
- Margate
- Metrogas
- Millwall
- Northfleet United++
- Norton Sports (defunct)
- Orpington
- Phoenix Sports
- Punjab United
- Ramsgate
- Rusthall
- Sevenoaks Town
- Sheppey United
- Sittingbourne
- Slade Green (defunct)
- Snowdown Colliery Welfare (defunct)
- Stansfeld (O & B) Club
- Swanley Furness (defunct)
- Sutton Athletic
- Thamesmead Town (defunct)
- Tonbridge Angels
- Tunbridge Wells
- VCD Athletic
- Welling United
- Whitstable Town
- Woodstock Sports (defunct)
- Woolwich Arsenal (Moved to Highbury, London in 1913)

+Renamed in 2007 from Gravesend & Northfleet to Ebbsfleet United
++Merged in 1946 to form Gravesend & Northfleet
