= 2011–12 Kent Football League =

The 2011–12 Kent Football League season (known as the 2011–12 Hurlimann Kent Football League for sponsorship reasons) was the 46th in the history of Kent Football League a football competition in England.

The League structure comprised three divisions: a Premier Division together with Divisions One and Two – the latter two were known as the Reserves Section, comprising reserves teams which were not permitted in the Premier Division. Additionally there were two league cup competitions, the Challenge Cup for the Premier Division clubs and another for the teams in the two divisions of the Reserves Section.

== Premier Division ==
Kent Football League Premier Division
- Season: 2011–12
- Champions: Herne Bay
- Promoted: Herne Bay
- Matches: 240
- Goals: 814 (3.39 per match)

The division comprised teams from 16 clubs, 14 of which competed in the previous season together with two additional teams, who both joined from the Kent County League:

- Canterbury City returning to the league after an absence of ten seasons
- Cray Valley Paper Mills

Also, Norton Sports changed their name to Woodstock Sports.

At the end of the season Herne Bay were promoted to the Isthmian League Division One South.

=== League table ===
Pos	Team	Pld	W	D	L	GF	GA	GD	Pts	Promotion
1	Herne Bay	30	21	5	4	73	31	+42	68	Promoted to the Isthmian League Division One South
2	Erith & Belvedere	30	19	4	7	77	47	+30	61	
3	VCD Athletic	30	18	4	8	54	26	+28	58	
4	Erith Town	30	17	6	7	56	38	+18	57	
5	Tunbridge Wells	30	17	4	9	66	40	+26	55	
6	Beckenham Town	30	14	11	5	72	36	+36	53	
7	Corinthian	30	13	6	11	54	40	+14	45	
8	Woodstock Sports	30	14	2	14	55	58	−3	44	
9	Canterbury City	30	12	5	13	52	58	−6	41	
10	Fisher	30	10	6	14	51	62	−11	36	
11	Cray Valley Paper Mills	30	9	7	14	34	50	−16	34	
12	Lordswood	30	8	8	14	43	57	−14	32	
13	Holmesdale	30	7	4	19	43	73	−30	25	
14	Sevenoaks Town	30	5	8	17	29	55	−26	23	
15	Deal Town	30	5	8	17	26	70	−44	23	
16	Greenwich Borough	30	5	4	21	29	73	−44	19	

Source: Kent League (archived)
Rules for classification: 1) points; 2) goal difference; 3) number of goals scored.

=== Results ===
Home \ Away	BEC	CAN	COR	CVP	DEA	E&B	ERI	FIS	GRE	HER	HOL	LOR	SEV	TUN	VCD	WOO
Beckenham Town		3–1	1–1	4–1	7–0	2–2	3–0	2–2	4–0	2–4	5–0	4–0	1–1	3–0	0–0	3–1
Canterbury City	0–0		0–2	1–1	3–2	1–5	1–3	2–4	5–0	2–3	1–1	1–0	3–1	1–6	3–1	2–1
Corinthian	1–0	2–1		0–1	10–0	2–2	1–3	1–2	3–1	1–1	3–1	3–3	1–0	1–0	1–2	1–2
Cray Valley Paper Mills	1–1	1–4	2–1		1–0	4–2	2–1	1–2	0–0	0–3	3–2	1–2	0–2	2–3	1–1	1–2
Deal Town	0–0	1–0	0–4	0–0		2–2	3–1	1–1	2–0	0–4	1–4	0–2	2–2	1–1	1–3	0–1
Erith & Belvedere	4–3	2–3	5–2	4–0	3–1		1–2	3–1	2–0	3–2	2–1	2–3	1–0	1–1	1–2	2–1
Erith Town	4–2	2–2	1–1	0–4	2–1	4–1		3–0	0–0	2–2	4–3	2–02	1–0	1–3	2–1	3–1
Fisher	0–4	0–2	1–1	0–0	4–0	0–2	1–1		2–3	1–5	5–1	2–2	4–0	1–3	1–2	2–1
Greenwich Borough	0–2	1–2	1–3	1–0	4–2	0–4	1–2	2–6		0–2	1–5	3–3	0–3	2–5	0–1	3–0
Herne Bay	1–1	2–1	2–0	3–0	2–1	1–2	1–0	3–0	5–0		4–2	3–1	1–02	2–3	0–0	3–1
Holmesdale	2–4	2–3	1–2	1–2	1–1	2–5	0–6	3–1	0–1	1–4		0–1	2–1	2–2	1–1	0–3
Lordswood	2–4	1–2	1–0	1–2	1–1	3–1	0–1	0–1	3–2	3–4	1–1		2–2	0–1	1–1	4–4
Sevenoaks Town	1–1	3–3	0–2	1–1	0–1	2–3	1–1	0–5	1–0	1–1	0–2	0–1		2–3	0–5	3–1
Tunbridge Wells	1–3	3–1	1–3	2–0	5–0	0–1	0–3	6–1	1–1	0–2	4–1	4–0	2–0		0–2	4–0
VCD Athletic	3–0	2–1	3–1	1–0	0–1	1–2	0–1	4–0	3–1	2–1	3–0	2–0	4–0	1–2		2–1
Woodstock Sports	3–3	4–1	2–0	5–2	2–1	1–7	2–0	4–1	2–1	1–2	0–1	3–2	1–2	2–0	3–2	

Source: Kent League (archived)
Legend: Blue = home team win; Yellow = draw; Red = away team win.

=== Challenge Cup ===
The 2011–12 Kent Football League Challenge Cup, known as the Macron Kent League Cup (to reflect sponsorship by the Macron Sportswear brand), was won by VCD Athletic.

The competition was contested by the 16 teams from the Premier Division over a total of four rounds: three on an aggregate basis (home and away matches) followed by a final match played on a neutral ground (at Cray Valley Paper Mills F.C. this season).

==== Quarter-finals, Semi-finals and Final ====
Quarter-finals
Beckenham Town	2	0	2
VCD Athletic	1	2	3
Herne Bay	3	4	7
Erith & Belvedere	1	0	1
Woodstock Sports	0	5	5
Erith Town	1	3	4
Corinthian	2	0	2
Fisher	0	0	0

Semi-finals
VCD Athletic	1	2	3
Herne Bay	0	1	1
Woodstock Sports	0	0	0
Corinthian	4	1	5

Final
VCD Athletic	2
Corinthian	0

==== First Round ====
- Cray Valley Paper Mills 3 – 6 Beckenham Town (1st Leg 2–6; 2nd Leg 1–0)
- Tunbridge Wells 2 – 3 VCD Athletic (1st Leg 1–3; 2nd Leg 1–0)
- Herne Bay 6 – 0 Deal Town (1st Leg 3–0; 2nd Leg 3–0)
- Sevenoaks Town 0 – 5 Erith & Belvedere (1st Leg 0–2; 2nd Leg 0–3)
- Woodstock Sports 5 – 2 Greenwich Borough (1st Leg 3–1; 2nd Leg 2–1)
- Lordswood 1 – 3 Erith Town (1st Leg 1–0; 2nd Leg 0–3)
- Corinthian 5 – 4 Holmesdale (1st Leg 1–1; 2nd Leg 4–3)
- Fisher 11 – 8 Canterbury City (1st Leg 6–6; 2nd Leg 5–2)

Source: SCEFL Archives

== Reserves Section ==
The letter "R" following team names indicates a club’s reserves team.

The Reserves Section comprised two divisions, with promotion and relegation possible between the divisions. Promotion from the Reserves Section into the Premier Division was not permitted. There was a single League Cup competition for all teams in the Section.

=== Division One ===
Kent Football League Division One
- Season: 2011–12
- Champions: Herne Bay R
- Matches: 72
- Goals: 303 (4.21 per match)

The division comprised nine clubs, seven of which competed in the previous season together with two additional clubs both promoted from Division Two: champions Faversham Town R and runners-up Deal Town R.

At the end of the season Faversham Town R and Erith & Belvedere R left the league.

==== League table ====
Pos	Team	Pld	W	D	L	GF	GA	GD	Pts	Season End Notes
1	Herne Bay R	16	12	2	2	50	23	+27	38	
2	Faversham Town R	16	12	1	3	49	12	+37	37	Resigned from the League
3	Whitstable Town R	16	11	1	4	46	16	+30	34	
4	Maidstone United R	16	7	5	4	45	24	+21	26	
5	Erith Town R	16	7	3	6	27	21	+6	24	
6	Chatham Town R	16	6	2	8	28	38	−10	20	
7	Margate R	16	3	2	11	26	57	−31	11	
8	Erith & Belvedere R	16	3	0	13	18	51	−33	9	Resigned from the League
9	Deal Town R	16	2	2	12	14	61	−47	8	

Source: Kent League (archived)
Rules for classification: 1) points; 2) goal difference; 3) number of goals scored.

==== Results ====
Home \ Away	CHA	DEA	E&B	ERI	FAV	HER	MAI	MAR	WHI
Chatham Town R		2–1	3–2	1–4	1–4	3–4	2–2	6–1	0–4
Deal Town R	0–1		3–0	0–3	1–8	2–3	1–1	1–1	0–5
Erith & Belvedere R	2–0	5–0		0–4	0–4	4–7	0–4	3–0	0–3
Erith Town R	1–1	3–0	2–0		0–5	0–3	2–2	3–0	1–3
Faversham Town R	4–0	0–1	2–0	2–0		4–0	2–0	3–1	2–1
Herne Bay R	3–2	10–0	4–0	2–0	3–2		1–1	4–0	2–1
Maidstone United R	3–0	11–0	3–1	1–0	2–2	2–1		8–1	0–2
Margate R	3–4	3–2	4–1	0–3	1–5	2–2	6–3		2–5
Whitstable Town R	0–2	5–2	8–0	1–1	1–0	0–1	3–2	4–1	

Source: Kent League (archived)
Legend: Blue = home team win; Yellow = draw; Red = away team win.

=== Division Two ===
Kent Football League Division Two
- Season: 2011–12
- Champions: Phoenix Sports R
- Matches: 56
- Goals: 194 (3.46 per match)

The division comprised eight clubs, five of which competed in the previous season together with three additional clubs:

- Phoenix Sports R
- Welling United R returning to the league after an absence of two seasons
- Woodstock Sports R

At the end of the season Folkestone Invicta R and Welling United R left the league. Thereafter it was discontinued with the remaining six teams moved to a single enlarged Division One.

==== League table ====
Pos	Team	Pld	W	D	L	GF	GA	GD	Pts	Season End Notes
1	Phoenix Sports R	14	11	1	2	45	14	+31	34	Moved to Division One
2	VCD Athletic R	14	11	1	2	40	15	+25	34	Moved to Division One
3	Ramsgate R	14	7	2	5	26	21	+5	23	Moved to Division One
4	Holmesdale R	14	6	2	6	23	17	+6	20	Moved to Division One
5	Welling United R	14	6	2	6	28	23	+5	20	Resigned from the League
6	Folkestone Invicta R	14	3	4	7	13	23	−10	13	Resigned from the League
7	Lordswood R	14	3	2	9	9	36	−27	11	Moved to Division One
8	Woodstock Sports R	14	1	2	11	10	45	−35	5	Moved to Division One

Source: Kent League (archived)
Rules for classification: 1) points; 2) goal difference; 3) number of goals scored.

==== Results ====
Home \ Away	FOL	HOL	LOR	PHO	RAM	VCD	WEL	WOO
Folkestone Invicta R		1–3	0–0	2–3	0–0	1–3	0–0	1–1
Holmesdale R	4–0		1–1	3–2	0–1	1–0	1–2	3–0
Lordswood R	0–1	0–3		1–3	0–5	0–4	0–2	1–3
Phoenix Sports R	3–0	1–0	6–0		5–0	0–2	0–0	6–0
Ramsgate R	3–1	4–2	0–2	1–2		2–2	1–0	2–1
VCD Athletic R	2–1	2–0	6–0	1–5	4–1		3–2	3–0
Welling United R	0–1	3–2	2–3	3–4	2–1	1–5		5–1
Woodstock Sports R	1–4	0–0	0–1	0–5	0–5	1–3	1–6	

Source: Kent League (archived)
Legend: Blue = home team win; Yellow = draw; Red = away team win.

=== Reserves Cup ===
The 2011–12 Kent Football League Reserves Cup was won by Herne Bay R.

The competition was contested by the 17 teams from Division One and Division Two initially organised into four groups. The group winners progressed to the semi-finals, which were decided on an aggregate basis (home and away matches), followed by a final match played on a neutral ground (at Cray Valley Paper Mills F.C. this season).

==== Semi-finals and Final ====
Semi-finals
VCD Athletic R	2	0	W (Note: Faversham Town R disqualified, tie awarded to VCD Athletic R)
Faversham Town R	0	3	d
Herne Bay R	1	1	2
Phoenix Sports R	0	2	2

Final
VCD Athletic R	0
Herne Bay R	1

==== Group Stage ====
- Group A

Pos	Team	Pld	W	D	L	GF	GA	GD	Pts	
1	Phoenix Sports R	6	4	2	0	16	3	+13	14	Progressed to Semi-final
2	Erith Town R	6	3	2	1	10	5	+5	11	
3	Welling United R	6	3	0	3	10	13	−3	9	
4	Erith & Belvedere R	6	0	0	6	2	17	−15	0	

Source: SCEFL Archives
Rules for classification: 1) points; 2) goal difference; 3) number of goals scored.
- Group B

Pos	Team	Pld	W	D	L	GF	GA	GD	Pts	
1	VCD Athletic R	6	3	3	0	9	6	+3	12	Progressed to Semi-final
2	Maidstone United R	6	3	1	2	19	7	+12	10	
3	Holmesdale R	6	2	2	2	11	17	−6	8	
4	Chatham Town R	6	0	2	4	13	22	−9	2	

Source: SCEFL Archives
Rules for classification: 1) points; 2) goal difference; 3) number of goals scored.
- Group C

Pos	Team	Pld	W	D	L	GF	GA	GD	Pts	
1	Faversham Town R	8	7	1	0	25	6	+19	22	Progressed to Semi-final
2	Whitstable Town R	8	6	0	2	23	8	+15	18	
3	Margate R	8	3	0	5	16	22	−6	9	
4	Woodstock Sports R	8	2	1	5	9	20	−11	7	
5	Lordswood R	8	1	0	7	8	25	−17	3	

Source: SCEFL Archives
Rules for classification: 1) points; 2) goal difference; 3) number of goals scored.
- Group D

Pos	Team	Pld	W	D	L	GF	GA	GD	Pts	
1	Herne Bay R	6	5	0	1	16	7	+9	12 (Note: Herne Bay R were deducted three points.)	Progressed to Semi-final
2	Ramsgate R	6	4	0	2	10	5	+5	12	
3	Deal Town R	6	2	0	4	3	10	−7	6	
4	Folkestone Invicta R	6	1	0	5	5	12	−7	3	

Source: SCEFL Archives
Rules for classification: 1) points; 2) goal difference; 3) number of goals scored.
