= 2019–20 Southern Counties East Football League =

The 2019–20 Southern Counties East Football League season was the 54th in the history of the Southern Counties East Football League, a football competition in England, and the fourth year the competition had two divisions, the Premier Division and Division One.

The allocations for Steps 1 to 6 for season 2019–20 were announced by the FA on 19 May. These were subject to appeal, and the Southern Counties East's constitution was ratified at the league's AGM on 22 June.

As a result of the COVID-19 pandemic, this season's competition was formally abandoned on 26 March 2020, with all results from the season being expunged, and no promotion or relegation taking place to, from, or within the competition. On 30 March 2020, sixty-six non-league clubs sent an open letter to the Football Association requesting that they reconsider their decision.

== Premier Division ==
Southern Counties East Football League Premier Division
- Season: 2019–20
- Matches: 251
- Goals: 913 (3.64 per match)

The Premier Division consisted of 17 clubs from the previous season along with three new clubs:

- Erith & Belvedere, promoted from Division One
- Greenwich Borough, relegated from the Isthmian League
- Welling Town, promoted from Division One

=== League table ===
Pos	Team	Pld	W	D	L	GF	GA	GD	Pts	Promotion or relegation
1	Beckenham Town	27	19	3	5	61	30	+31	60	
2	Corinthian	26	18	4	4	71	32	+39	58	
3	Chatham Town	28	17	5	6	68	35	+33	56	
4	Sheppey United	27	16	7	4	80	34	+46	55	
5	Tunbridge Wells	23	15	1	7	57	38	+19	46	
6	Hollands & Blair	28	11	9	8	56	37	+19	42	
7	Bearsted	25	11	4	10	68	52	+16	37	
8	Canterbury City	25	9	8	8	41	38	+3	35	
9	Welling Town	27	9	7	11	42	50	−8	34	
10	Erith Town	26	9	6	11	38	41	−3	33	
11	Deal Town	24	9	5	10	37	40	−3	32	
12	Fisher	26	8	8	10	32	37	−5	32	
13	Lordswood	26	9	5	12	36	43	−7	32	
14	Glebe	22	8	5	9	41	39	+2	29	
15	K Sports	31	8	5	18	45	71	−26	29	
16	Punjab United	28	6	6	16	36	51	−15	24	
17	AFC Croydon Athletic	27	7	3	17	37	70	−33	24	
18	Crowborough Athletic	28	6	5	17	32	82	−50	23	
19	Erith & Belvedere	28	4	8	16	35	93	−58	20	
20	Greenwich Borough	0	0	0	0	0	0	0	0	Club folded, record expunged (Note: Greenwich Borough resigned in January. All results rescinded.)

Source: FA Full-time
Rules for classification: 1) Points; 2) Goal difference; 3) Number of goals scored; 4) Number of matches won; 5) Head-to-head results

== Division One ==
Southern Counties East Football League Division One
- Season: 2019–20
- Matches: 214
- Goals: 830 (3.88 per match)

Division One consisted of 15 clubs from the previous season along with two new clubs, relegated from the Premier Division:

- Croydon
- Rusthall

=== League table ===
Pos	Team	Pld	W	D	L	GF	GA	GD	Pts
1	Kennington	26	17	4	5	73	35	+38	55
2	Rusthall	25	17	3	5	72	33	+39	54
3	Holmesdale	24	15	6	3	53	17	+36	51
4	Sporting Club Thamesmead	26	13	6	7	60	33	+27	45
5	Rochester United	23	14	3	6	54	33	+21	45
6	FC Elmstead	24	13	6	5	48	34	+14	45
7	Stansfeld	24	13	6	5	40	31	+9	45
8	Croydon	24	12	3	9	51	39	+12	39
9	Greenways	26	11	4	11	73	64	+9	37
10	Lewisham Borough	26	11	4	11	51	58	−7	37
11	Sutton Athletic	25	9	6	10	53	43	+10	33
12	Forest Hill Park	26	9	5	12	41	48	−7	32
13	Bridon Ropes	27	7	2	18	53	73	−20	23
14	Lydd Town	26	6	4	16	40	70	−30	22
15	Meridian VP	26	4	6	16	24	68	−44	18
16	Snodland Town	24	3	5	16	22	63	−41	14
17	Kent Football United	26	1	5	20	22	88	−66	8

Source: FA Full-time
Rules for classification: 1) Points; 2) Goal difference; 3) Number of goals scored; 4) Number of matches won; 5) Head-to-head results
