= South London Football Alliance =

Association football league in England

- Founded: 1920
- Folded: 2017
- Country: England
- League cup(s): Beckenham Hospital Cup; Elizabeth Jaques Charity Cup; Queen Mary Charity Cup

The South London Football Alliance was a football competition based in South London, England. It was founded in 1920 and had in its last season 2016/17 a total of 2 divisions with 23 teams. The league was not part of the English football league system as it was not a feeder league within the football pyramid. However it generally fed the Kent County League's bottom divisions, Division Three East and Division Three West.

In 2017 it merged with the Bromley and District Football League to form the Bromley and South London League.

The league was affiliated to the London Football Association and Kent County Football Association.

== History ==
The South London Football Alliance was formed in 1920 and began operating for competitive play in Season 1921/22. Johnson & Phillips are the only founder member of the league that remain in membership. The area covered by the competition membership was 15 miles from Beresford Square, Woolwich. Other competitions which come under the umbrella of the league were:

- Queen Mary Charity Cup (formed in 1926)
- Elizabeth Jaques Charity Cup (formed in 1947)

== Member clubs 2016–17 ==
The league's member clubs in its last season were as follows:

=== Premier Division ===
- Croydon BR FC
- Golden Lion
- Lewisham Athletic Reserves
- Kingsdale
- Long Lane 'A'
- Metrogas 'A'
- Our Lady Seniors
- Red Velvet
- Thames Borough
- Tudor Sports
- West Bromley Albion

=== Division One ===
- Bexlians 'A'
- Croydon BR Reserves
- Danson Sports
- Eltham Town
- Farnborough Old Boys Guild 'A'
- Iron Tugboat City
- Johnson & Phillips Reserves
- London Borough
- Old Bromleians Reserves
- Old Colfeians
- Seven Acre Sports
- Shirley Town

== Recent divisional champions ==
Season	Premier Division	Division One	Division Two	Division Three	Division Four
2003–04	Metrogas	Penhill Standard	Catford Wanderers "B"	Crofton Albion	Bridon Sports Reserves
2004–05	Metrogas	Middle Park	Seven Acre Sports Reserves	Oakdale Athletic	Desportiva Portuguese
2005–06	Tudor Sports	Forest Hill Park	Cray Valley Paper Mills "A"	AFC Sydenham	Elite
2006–07	Kingfisher	Wilmington	AFC Sydenham	Elite	Crofton Albion Reserves
2007–08	Crofton Albion	Bexlians	Cray Valley Paper Mills "A"	Charterhouse-in-Southwark	Charlton Athletic Community
2008–09	Blackheath Wanderers	Seven Acre Sports	Bexley	Eltham Town	Crofton Albion "A"
2009–10	Eden Park Rangers	Bridon Ropes Reserves	Bridon Ropes 'A'	F.C. Elmstead	Dartford Town
2010–11	FC Hollington	AFC Mottingham	Blackheath Wanderers	Old Roan 'A'	Thames Borough Reserves
2011–12	Long Lane	Long Lane Reserves	Lewisham Athletic	New Park Reserves	Old Colfeians Reserves
2012–13	Johnson & Phillips	Lewisham Athletic	Beehive	New Park	Hope & Glory
2013–14	Lewisham Athletic	Red Velvet	Seven Acre Sports	Bexley Sports	
2014–15	Beehive	Waterloo	Croydon BR	Red Velvet 'A'	
2015–16	Wickham Park	Red Velvet reserves	Goldon Lion		
2016–17	Red Velvet	Eltham Town			

== Other London and Kent Leagues ==
Main index: Affiliated Leagues in London
There are a number of other leagues that are affiliated to the London Football Association.

Main index: Affiliated Leagues in Kent
There are a number of other leagues that are affiliated to the Kent County Football Association.
