= 1968–69 Kent Football League =

The 1968–69 Kent Football League season was the third in the history of the Kent Football League, a football competition based in and around the county of Kent in England.

From this season the league was renamed and known as the Kent Football League from its previous title the Kent Premier League. Additionally it was agreed that all member clubs must have 'Senior Status' (relating to the footballing facilities of the club rather than age of players). Current club Orpington Athletic were permitted to retain membership whilst they applied for accreditation.

The league comprised one division and there was also a league cup competition, the Challenge Cup.

== Kent Football League ==
Kent Football League
- Season: 1968–69
- Champions: Brett Sports
- Matches: 306
- Goals: 1,186 (3.88 per match)

The league featured teams from 18 clubs including eight reserves teams. Fifteen of the clubs had competed in the league the previous season and they were joined by three additional clubs:

- Chatham Town, joined from the Metropolitan League
- Crockenhill, joined from the Greater London League
- Gravesend & Northfleet Reserves, newly reformed

Also, Folkestone Town Reserves changed their name to Folkestone Reserves.

The league was won by Brett Sports.

After the end of the season three clubs, Canterbury City Reserves, Gravesend & Northfleet Reserves and Tonbridge Reserves left the league; whilst Orpington Athletic were expelled as they had failed to obtain obtained Senior status, their ground facilities were not of the required standard.

=== League table ===
Pos	Team	Pld	W	D	L	GF	GA	GAv	Pts	Season End Notes
1	Brett Sports	34	23	5	6	98	27	3.630	51	
2	Tunbridge Wells	34	21	8	5	92	41	2.244	50	
3	Margate Reserves	34	20	8	6	89	43	2.070	48	
4	Sittingbourne	34	21	6	7	77	40	1.925	48	
5	Chatham Town	34	20	6	8	80	52	1.538	46	
6	Ramsgate Athletic Reserves	34	18	6	10	90	59	1.525	42	
7	Tunnel Sports	34	15	10	9	70	47	1.489	40	
8	Sheppey United Reserves	34	17	6	11	75	52	1.442	40	
9	Orpington Athletic	34	11	11	12	52	64	0.813	33	Expelled (after season)
10	Faversham Town	34	13	5	16	60	63	0.952	31	
11	Whitstable Town	34	14	3	17	61	66	0.924	31	
12	Deal Town Reserves	34	12	5	17	59	69	0.855	29	
13	Canterbury City Reserves	34	11	6	17	51	79	0.646	28	Resigned from league
14	Crockenhill	34	11	5	18	57	82	0.695	27	
15	Snowdown Colliery Welfare	34	9	8	17	54	60	0.900	26	
16	Folkestone Reserves	34	10	4	20	50	88	0.568	24	
17	Gravesend & Northfleet Reserves	34	5	3	26	36	125	0.288	13	Resigned from league
18	Tonbridge Reserves	34	1	3	30	35	129	0.271	5	Resigned from league

Source: nonleaguematters, "Kent League". Faversham News. 27 June 1969. p. 8 – via British Newspaper Archive.
Rules for classification: 1) points; 2) goal average; 3) number of goals scored.

=== Challenge Cup ===
The 1968–69 Kent Football League Challenge Cup was won by Margate Reserves.

The competition was contested by the 18 teams from the league over four single match knock-out rounds followed by the final played on a neutral ground (at Sittingbourne F.C. this season).

==== Quarter-finals, Semi-finals and Final ====
Quarter-finals
Margate Reserves	3
Tunnel Sports	1
Whitstable Town	5
Folkestone Reserves	0
Chatham Town	4
Orpington Athletic	0
Brett Sports	2
Crockenhill	0

Semi-finals
Margate Reserves	1	1 (Note: Replay)
Whitstable Town	1	0
Chatham Town	0	0 (Note: Replay)
Brett Sports	0	5

Final
Margate Reserves	5 (Note: After extra time; score at 90 minutes: 3–3)
Brett Sports	3

==== Second Round ====
- Margate Reserves 5 – 0 Faversham Town
- Tunnel Sports 2 – 0 Snowdown Colliery Welfare
- Deal Town Reserves 3 – 3 Whitstable Town
- REPLAY ONE: Whitstable Town 4 – 4 (aet) Deal Town Reserves (score at 90 minutes: 2–2)
- REPLAY TWO: Deal Town Reserves 1 – 3 (aet) Whitstable Town (score at 90 minutes: 1–1) Played at Canterbury City F.C.
- Sheppey United Reserves 0 – 1 Folkestone Reserves
- Gravesend & Northfleet Reserves 1 – 2 Chatham Town
- Orpington Athletic v Canterbury City Reserves
- Brett Sports 2 – 0 Tonbridge Reserves
- Tunbridge Wells 2 – 3 Crockenhill

==== First Round ====
- Tunnel Sports 2 – 1 Ramsgate Athletic Reserves
- Sheppey United Reserves 2 – 1 Sittingbourne

Byes for the other 14 teams

Sources:

- First Round: "Kent League Cup". Whitstable Times. 17 January 1969. p. 4 – via British Newspaper Archive.; "Sport Summary: Kent League Cup". Daily Mirror. 6 February 1969. p. 23 – via British Newspaper Archive.
- Second Round: "Kent Soccer Details: Results: Saturday: Kent League; League Cup (2nd round)". Kent Messenger. 21 February 1969. p. 2 – via British Newspaper Archive.; "Kent Soccer Details: Results: Saturday: Kent League; League Cup 2nd round". Kent Messenger. 28 February 1969. p. 2 – via British Newspaper Archive.; "Kent Soccer Details: Results: Saturday: Kent League; Saturday: Kent League; League Cup 2nd round replay". Kent Messenger. 7 March 1969. p. 2 – via British Newspaper Archive.; "Kent Soccer Details: Results: Monday: Kent League Cup 2nd round". Kent Messenger. 7 March 1969. p. 2 – via British Newspaper Archive.; "Kent Soccer Details: Results: Tuesday: Kent League; League Cup 2nd round 2nd replay". Kent Messenger. 7 March 1969. p. 2 – via British Newspaper Archive.
- Quarter-finals: "Kent Leage; League Cup quarter-finals". Sunday Mirror. 9 March 1969. p. 4 – via British Newspaper Archive.; "Kent Soccer Details: Results: Saturday: Kent League; League Cup 3rd round". Kent Messenger. 21 March 1969. p. 2 – via British Newspaper Archive.; "Results: Kent League Cup (Quarter-final)". Thanet Times. 1 April 1969. p. 2 – via British Newspaper Archive.;
- Semi-finals: "Results: Kent League Cup (Semi-finals)". Thanet Times. 15 April 1969. p. 2 – via British Newspaper Archive.; "Kent League: (Semi-final Replays)". Whitstable Times. 25 April 1969 – via British Newspaper Archive.;
- Final: "Last Saturday's Results: Kent League Cup Final". Whitstable Times. 23 May 1969. p. 4 – via British Newspaper Archive.
