= Walter Davis (footballer) =

Welsh footballer (1888–1937)

Personal information
- Full name: Walter Otto Davis
- Date of birth: 29 September 1888
- Place of birth: Mold, Flintshire, Wales
- Date of death: 20 May 1937 (aged 48)
- Place of death: Bow Creek, London, England
- Position: Centre forward

Youth career
- Army football

Senior career*
Years	Team	Apps	(Gls)
1910–1911	Metrogas		
1911–1920	Millwall	113	(65)

International career
1913–1914	Wales	5	(1)
- * Club domestic league appearances and goals

Walter Otto Davis (29 September 1888 – 20 May 1937) was a Welsh professional footballer who played at centre forward for Millwall for ten years in the 1910s. He also made five appearances for the Welsh national team.

== Football career ==
Davis was born in Mold, Flintshire, and was one of six brothers. His second name came from a German soldier who was a friend of his father.

When he was still a child, his family moved to London, where his father, W.J. Davis, became an alderman in West Ham and chairman of the governors of the Municipal Central Secondary School in Tennyson Road before serving as the mayor in 1920–21.

When one of his brothers died whilst playing in a junior football match at Leytonstone, his parents ordered Walter to stop playing football. After he joined the army, he joined the 2nd Bedfordshire Regiment and was stationed in Gibraltar where he played football for the Army. On leaving the army in 1911, he joined Metrogas, but turned professional with Millwall of the Southern League shortly afterwards. In January 1912, he scored Millwall's only goal in their FA Cup First-round match at First Division Bury.

Davis was a deadly finisher, with exceptional speed and ball control and in the 1912–13 season, he emerged as a "goalscoring sensation" and soon attracted "fabulous offers" from Football League clubs. He was the Lions' leading goalscorer in each season he played, and he holds the record as Millwall's leading goalscorer in the Southern League. Davis was a dribbler with a fine body swerve, and also had a fierce shot from almost any distance.

In 1914, Millwall again came up against First Division opposition in the FA Cup, with Davis scoring the only goal against Chelsea in the First round replay. He scored again against Bradford City in Round Two, before going out to yet another club from the First Division, Sheffield United. The goal he scored against Bradford was considered by many to be the best ever scored at The Den and was described by the national papers as a "wonder goal"; he received the ball from a throw-in around the half-way line, sidestepped his marker, beat both full-backs and then slipped the ball past the keeper into the net. The following season, Davis again scored against opponents from the Football League First Division, but Bolton Wanderers went through after a second replay.

Davis was called up by Wales, making his debut in a 1–0 victory against Ireland on 18 January 1913. He retained his place for the next four matches, scoring a goal from 30 yards against England at Bristol on 17 March.

He also represented the Southern League several times and won a London Challenge Cup and two Kent Senior Shield medals in his time at Millwall.

== Later career and death ==
During World War I, Davis served in Italy where he incurred injuries to his legs. During the war he occasionally turned out for Millwall, including in a match against Clapton Orient in which he scored a hat-trick wearing army boots.

Davis was forced to retire from football early in 1919 as a result of an injury to his knee and took up employment as a groundsman with Chelmsford, before working as a labourer in the London Docks. He was found drowned in Bow Creek on 20 May 1937 in mysterious circumstances as he was a strong swimmer. The coroner's jury recorded an open verdict.

== International appearances ==
Davis made five appearances for Wales in international matches, as follows:

Date	Venue	Opponent	Result	Goals	Competition
18 January 1913	Grosvenor Park, Belfast	Ireland	1–0	0	British Home Championship
3 March 1913	Racecourse Ground, Wrexham	Scotland	0–0	0	British Home Championship
17 March 1913	Ashton Gate, Bristol	England	3–4	1	British Home Championship
19 January 1914	Racecourse Ground, Wrexham	Ireland	1–2	0	British Home Championship
28 February 1914	Celtic Park, Glasgow	Scotland	0–0	0	British Home Championship

Win	Draw	Loss
