= Cuxton 1991 F.C. =

Association football club in England

Cuxton 91
- Full name: Cuxton 1991 Football Club
- Founded: 1996; 30 years ago
- Ground: Gallagher Stadium, Maidstone
- Capacity: 4,200
- Manager: Adam Overton
- League: Kent County League Premier Division
- Website: https://www.cuxton91fc.org.uk/

Cuxton 1991 Football Club, also known simply as Cuxton 91, is an English football club based in the village of Cuxton in the unitary authority of Medway, Kent in South East England and currently play in the Kent County League Premier Division. The club is affiliated to the Kent County Football Association.

== History ==
Cuxton 1991 FC was founded in 1996, originally as a youth football team, however as the club grew they adopted an adult men's side. The club joined the Rochester & District Football League, and in the 2015–16 season, were instated into the Kent County League Division 3 East. The club won promotion in its first season, finishing runners up, earning promotion to the Division 2 Central & East where they secured back-to-back promotions to the Division 1 Central & East after winning the Division 2 title in 2016–17. Cuxton also made it to the final of the Les Leckie Cup in 2016–17, however lost 2–0 in the final to Rochester City.

In the 2022–23 season, Cuxton won the Division 1 Central & East title, earning promotion to the Premier Division for the first time. That same season, the club also won the Inter-Regional Challenge Cup defeating Ide Hill 3–0 in the final at Larkfield & New Hythe's Larkfield Community Stadium.

== Ground ==
Cuxton 91 play at the Cuxton Community Stadium, in Cuxton, which sits right next to the Cuxton Social Club.

In 2025–26, Cuxton began ground sharing with Maidstone United at their Gallagher Stadium, in hopes of gaining promotion to the Southern Counties East Football League as the Cuxton Community Stadium did not meet the league's ground regulations.

== Honours ==
- Kent County League
  - Division 1 Central & East champions: 2022–23
  - Division 2 Central & East champions: 2016–17
  - Inter-Regional Challenge Cup champions: 2022–23
  - Les Leckie Cup runners-up: 2016-17
