= Gillingham Town F.C. =

Gillingham Town F.C. may refer to

- Gillingham Town F.C. (Dorset)
- Gillingham Town F.C. (Kent)

== See also ==
- Gillingham F.C.
