= Kennington F.C. =

Association football club in England

Coordinates: 51°6′18″N 0°51′21.51″E

Kennington
- Full name: Kennington Football Club
- Nickname: The Ton
- Founded: 1880s
- Ground: The Homelands, Kingsnorth
- Capacity: 3,200
- Chairman: Jon Lancaster
- Manager: Dan Scorer
- League: Southern Counties East League Premier Division
- 2024–25: Southern Counties East League Premier Division, 15th of 20
Home colours	Away colours

Kennington Football Club is a football club based in the Kennington suburb of Ashford in Kent, England. They are currently members of the Southern Counties East League Premier Division and play at Ashford United's Homelands ground in nearby Kingsnorth.

== History ==
The club was established in the 1880s. They became members of the Ashford & District league, in which they played until moving up to the Premier Division of the Eastern Section of the Kent County League in 1989. The club won the Eastern Section Premier Cup and the Premier Division at the first attempt, earning promotion to the Senior Division. When the league was restructured in 1992, the club were placed in Division One (East).

In 1997–98, Kennington were Division One (East) runners-up. They went on to win the division the following season, but were not promoted to the Premier Division. After finishing as runners-up in the division again in 1999–2000 and 2000–01, the club won the division for a second time in 2001–02 and were promoted to the Premier Division. However, in 2003–04 they finished bottom of the Premier Division and were relegated back to Division One (East). In 2008–09 the club won the Weald of Kent Trophy.

League restructuring saw Kennington placed in Division One in 2011. They won the Bill Manklow Inter Regional Challenge Cup in 2012–13, before being moved back into Division One (East) when it was reintroduced at the end of the season. The club were runners-up in the division in 2014–15, and were promoted to the Premier Division. In 2017–18 they were Premier Division champions, earning promotion to Division One of the Southern Counties East League. In 2019–20 the club were top of Division One when the season was abandoned due to the COVID-19 pandemic. In 2021 the club were promoted to the Premier Division based on their results in the abandoned 2019–20 and 2020–21 seasons.

=== Season-by-season ===
Season	League	P	W	D	L	GF	GA	Pts	Pos	Notes
2002–03	Kent County League Premier Division	26	8	7	11	38	47	31	8/14	
2003–04	Kent County League Premier Division	26	1	5	20	29	80	8	14/14	Relegated
2004–05	Kent County League Division One East	22	6	6	10	33	47	24	8/12	
2005–06	Kent County League Division One East	24	11	4	9	50	50	37	6/13	
2006–07	Kent County League Division One East	24	6	1	17	36	46	19	12/13	
2007–08	Kent County League Division One East	18	3	3	12	19	42	12	9/10	
2008–09	Kent County League Division One East	20	7	5	8	41	48	26	6/11	
2009–10	Kent County League Division One East	24	4	2	18	32	71	14	12/13	
2010–11	Kent County League Division One East	24	6	5	13	35	72	23	10/13	
2011–12	Kent County League Division One	28	8	3	17	51	78	27	11/15	
2012–13	Kent County League Division One	24	12	3	9	58	53	39	4/13	
2013–14	Kent County League Division One East	20	10	0	10	39	48	30	4/11	
2014–15	Kent County League Division One East	18	12	3	3	47	25	39	2/10	Promoted
2015–16	Kent County League Premier Division	28	17	5	6	60	31	56	2/15	
2016–17	Kent County League Premier Division	29	18	5	6	81	43	58	4/16	
2017–18	Kent County League Premier Division	28	25	0	3	88	26	75	1/15	Promoted
2018–19	Southern Counties East League Division One	34	22	8	4	87	41	74	3/18	
2019–20	Southern Counties East League Division One	26	17	4	5	73	35	55	–	Season abandoned
2020–21	Southern Counties East League Division One	6	6	0	0	27	3	18	–	Season curtailed, promoted

== Ground ==
In 2012 Kennington moved to the Julie Rose Stadium. After briefly returning to their Sandyacres ground in 2018, later in the year they relocated to Ashford United's Homelands ground.

== Honours ==
- Kent County League
  - Premier Division champions 2017–18
  - Division One (East) champions 1998–99, 2001–02
  - Eastern Section Premier Division champions 1989–90
  - Weald of Kent Trophy winners 2008–09
  - Eastern Section Premier Cup winners 1989–90
  - Bill Manklow Inter Regional Challenge Cup winners 2012–13

== Records ==
- Highest league position: 3rd in the Southern Counties East League Division One, 2018–19
- Best FA Cup performance: Extra preliminary round, 2020–21
- Best FA Vase performance: Third round, 2020–21
