= Bexley F.C. =

Association football club in England

Coordinates: 51°26′38.78″N 0°9′18.11″E

Bexley
- Full name: Bexley Football Club
- Founded: 1884; 142 years ago
- Ground: St Mary's Recreation Ground, Bexley
- Chairman: Terry Peck
- League: Kent County League Premier Division
- Website: https://www.bexleyfc.co.uk/
Home colours

Bexley Football Club is a football club based in Bexley, London, England. They are currently members of the Kent County League Premier Division .

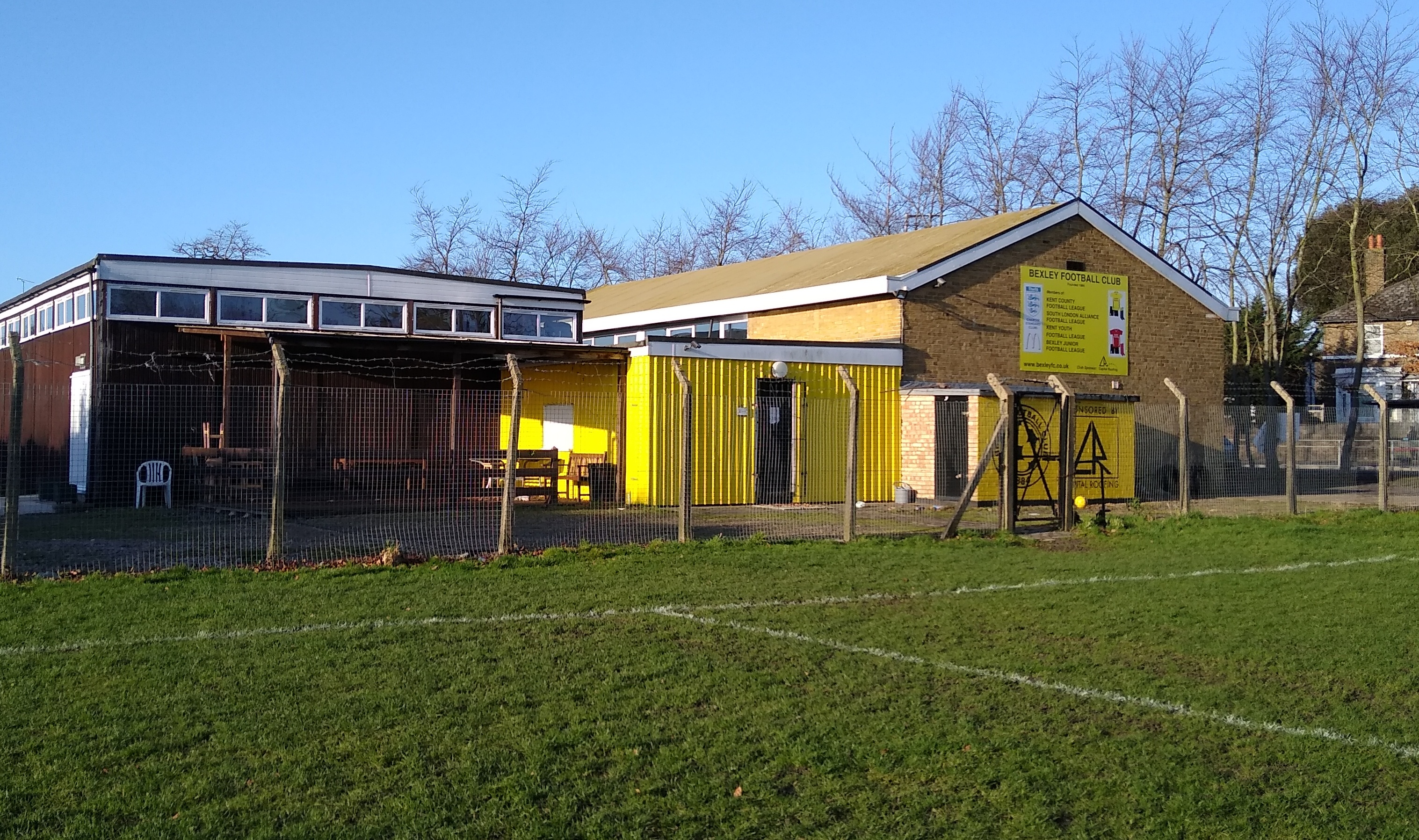
Clubhouse

== History ==
Bexley were formed in 1884, becoming registered with the Football Association in 1886. In 1927, Bexley became a senior club. In the 1939–40 season, Bexley entered the FA Cup for the first time, beating Gravesend United 3–1, however their progress in the cup was halted due to World War II. On 24 May 1946, Bexley amalgamated Bexley United into the club. In 1965, Bexley joined the Greater London League, becoming founder members of the London Spartan League in 1975, leaving the league in 1982. In 2010, Bexley joined the Kent County League from the South London Football Alliance, winning promotion to the Premier Division in 2015. In 2019, the club was relegated to the Division One West but returned to the Kent County Premier league, after winning Kent county Division One West, in 2023

== Ground ==
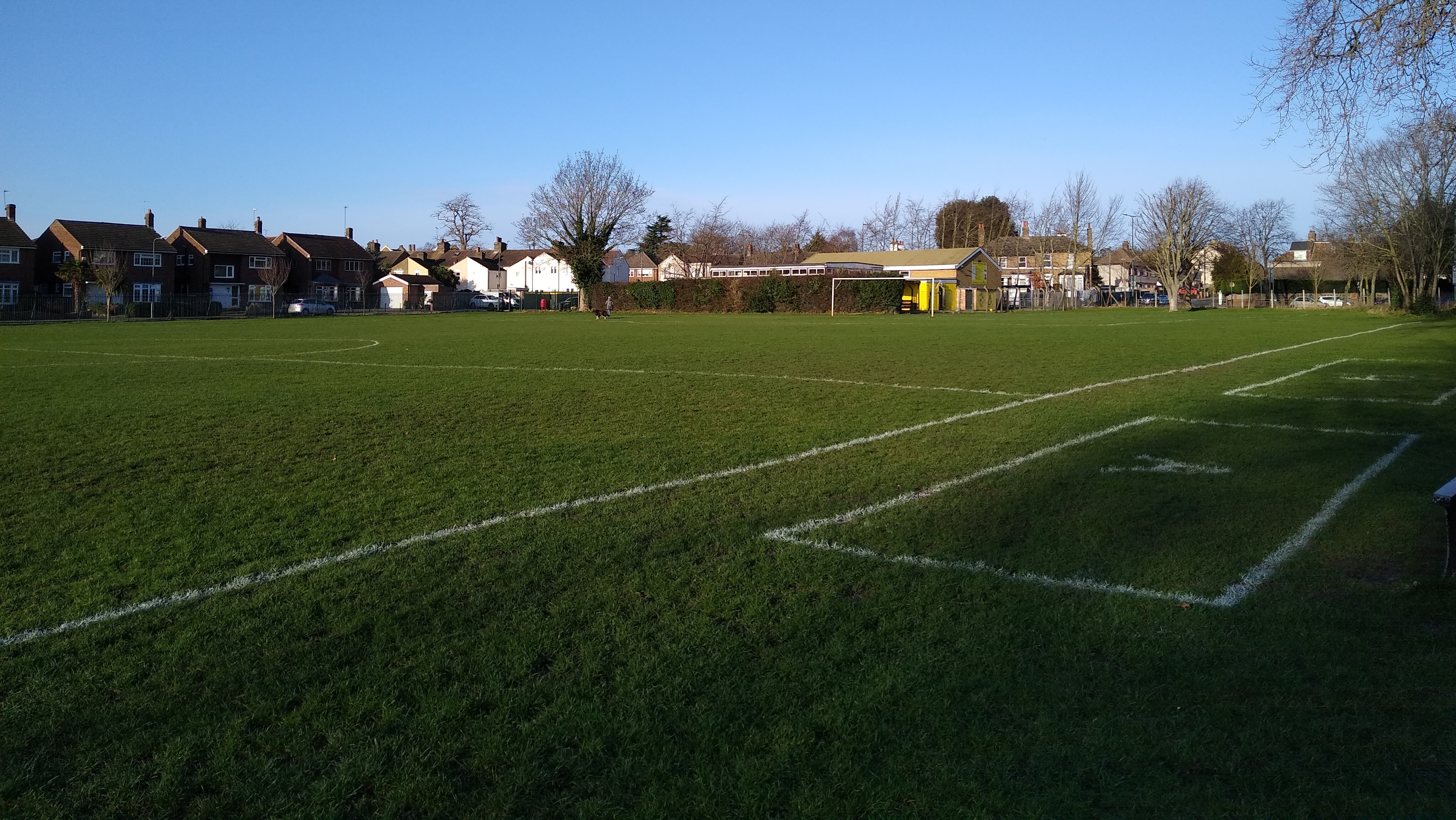
St Marys Recreation Ground

The first team are currently ground sharing with Cray Wanderers FC, at Flamingo Park Sports and Leisure (Sidcup Bypass). Whilst their Kent County Division Two Reserves side, play at St Mary's Recreation Ground in Bexley.

== Records ==
- Best FA Cup performance: Preliminary round, 1947–48
- Best FA Vase performance: Second round, 1974–75
