= Greenwich Borough F.C. =

Association football club in England

Coordinates: 51.458944°N 0.170378°E

Greenwich Borough
- Full name: Greenwich Borough Football Club
- Nicknames: Boro, The Cannons
- Founded: 1928
- Dissolved: 2020
- Ground: Danson Park, Welling (1928–37); Harrow Meadow, Eltham (1937–2009); Oakley Road, Bromley (2009–13); Princes Park, Dartford (2013–16); Badgers Sports Ground, Eltham (2016–19); Phoenix Sports Ground, Barnehurst (2019–20)
- Website: https://www.pitchero.com/clubs/greenwichboroughfc
Home colours	Away colours

Greenwich Borough Football Club was a football club based in south-east London, England.

== History ==
The club was established in 1928 as Woolwich Borough Council Athletic Club. They joined the Woolwich and District League and were champions in their first season. The following season saw them join Division One of the Western Section of the Kent County Amateur League. In 1934 Division One was renamed the Premier Division, and after finishing second-from-bottom of the division in 1934–35, the club were relegated to Division One. They finished bottom of Division One in 1939–40, but the league was largely abandoned the following season due to World War II.

Woolwich Borough Council rejoined the Kent County Amateur League in 1947, and despite their pre-war position, the club were placed in the Premier Division of the Western Section. However, after finishing second-from-bottom of the division in 1948–49, they left the league, dropping into Division Two of the South London Alliance. In 1954–55 they won the Division Two title, earning promotion to Division One. The following season saw them win Division One, resulting in promotion to the Premier Division. They went on to win the Premier Division title in six successive seasons from 1960–61 to 1965–66, also winning the Queen Mary Cup twice.

In 1965 the club was renamed London Borough of Greenwich following a change of London Borough boundaries. The club won a seventh South London Alliance Premier Division title in 1974, and in 1977 they moved up to the Senior Division of the London Spartan League. They won the Senior Division in 1979–80, earning promotion to the Premier Division. At the end of the season the club adopted its current name. In 1982–83 the club won the league's Senior Cup. In 1984 they transferred to the Kent League. They won the League Cup in their first season in the league, before going on to win back-to-back league titles in 1986–87 and 1987–88, as well as winning the League Cup for a second time in 1986–87. However, they were prevented from being promoted to the Southern League when the council refused planning permission for the necessary ground improvements.

Greenwich won a third League Cup in 1997–98. After five consecutive top-half finishes between 2006–07 and 2010–10, Greenwich finished bottom of the Kent League in 2011–12. The league was renamed the Southern Counties East League in 2013, and in 2014–15 the club won the Premier Division Cup. The following season saw them win the league, earning promotion to Division One South of the Isthmian League. In 2016–17 the club finished third in the division, qualifying for the promotion playoffs. However, they lost 4–3 to Corinthian-Casuals in the semi-finals. Although a fourth-place finish the following season saw the club finish fifth and reach the play-offs again, they lost 3–0 to Corinthian-Casuals in the semi-finals. At the end of the season they were moved into the South East Division as the league was reorganised.

In 2018–19 Greenwich finished bottom of the South East Division and were relegated to the Premier Division of the Southern Counties East League (the renamed Kent League). They resigned from the league in January 2020.

== Ground ==
Following the club's establishment, most home matches were played at Danson Park in Welling, before they moved to Harrow Meadow in Eltham in 1937. In 1978 floodlights were installed and inaugurated with a friendly match against Charlton Athletic. During the 1988–89 season the club was forced to groundshare at Erith & Belvedere's Park View ground, before returning to Harrow Meadow. The club was forced to move its pitch closer to the clubhouse, with a temporary stand installed behind one goal, later replaced by two small shelters.

At the end of the 2008–09 season Harrow Meadow was sold to property developers, with the club subsequently groundsharing with Holmesdale (from 2009) and then at Dartford's Princes Park (from 2013). In 2016 the club agreed a 30-year lease to share Cray Valley PM's Badgers Sports ground. The ground includes a 100-seat stand on one side of the pitch and a small covered area on the other. However, the club were evicted at the end of the 2018–19 season for failing to pay rent, and subsequently moved to the Phoenix Sports Ground in Barnehurst, sharing with Phoenix Sports.

== Honours ==
- Southern Counties East League
  - Champions 1986–87, 1987–88, 2015–16
  - League Cup winners 1984–85, 1986–87, 1997–98
  - Premier Division Cup winners 2014–15
- London Spartan League
  - Senior Division Champions 1979–80
  - Senior Cup Winners 1982–83
- Woolwich & District League
  - Champions 1928–29
- South London Alliance League
  - Premier Division champions 1960–61, 1961–62, 1962–63, 1963–64, 1964–65, 1965–66, 1973–74
  - Division One champions 1955–56
  - Division Two champions 1954–55
  - Queen Mary Cup winners 1964–65, 1965–66
- Kent Junior Cup A
  - County Winners 1961–62
  - Division One winners 1960–61, 1961–62
- Kent Junior Cup B
  - Division One winners 1955–56, 1975–76
- Kent Junior Cup C
  - Division One winners 1954–55

== Records ==
- Best FA Cup performance: Fourth qualifying round, 2014–15
- Best FA Trophy performance: Preliminary round, 2016–17
- Best FA Vase performance: Fifth round, 2007–08
- Record attendance: 2,000 vs Charlton Athletic, friendly match, 1978

== See also ==
- Greenwich Borough F.C. players
- Greenwich Borough F.C. managers
