= Brett Sports F.C. =

- Dissolved: 1995
- Ground: Bretts Corner ground

Brett Sports F.C was a football club based in Canterbury, Kent. They joined the Kent League in 1967–68 and won the title in 1969. However, they left the Kent League in 1973 and subsequently played in increasingly minor competitions before apparently folding.

== History ==
The club began life as the works team for Robert Brett & Sons, an engineering company based in the Wincheap district of Canterbury. The team played at a ground which had existed since at least 1906, but which Bretts had taken over during the inter-war years, and played in the Kent Amateur League prior to the Second World War. Immediately after the war, Bretts were considered the leading team in the city. In 1947 the newly formed Canterbury City team were permitted to share the ground, known as Bretts Corner, where they continued to play until 1958.

In the late 1950s, the Bretts club played for a time in the lower-level Canterbury & District League, before returning to the Kent Amateur League, and then in 1967 stepped up to the Kent Premier League (later renamed simply the Kent League). In only their second season at the higher level, Bretts won the Kent League championship and three years later were runners-up, missing out on a second title only on goal average. After just one more season in the Kent League, however, and despite a fourth-place finish, the club returned to the Kent Amateur League, and later stepped down to even lower-level competitions. By the mid-1990s the team had switched to Sunday league competition and were competing in the Whitstable and Herne Bay League, albeit still playing at the Bretts Corner ground. The club apparently folded sometime after 1995, as there is now no record of them competing in any league.
