= Gillingham Town F.C. (Kent) =

Association football club in England

- Full name: Gillingham Town Football Club
- Nickname: The Town
- Founded: 2010; 16 years ago
- Ground: Garrison Sports Ground, Chatham, Kent
- Capacity: 1200
- Chairman: Paul Pickford
- Manager: Lee Brumbaugh
- League: Kent County League Division Two East
- Website: Gillingham Town F.C. Official Website
Home colours

Gillingham Town Football Club is a county level football club based in Gillingham, Kent. The club are currently members of Kent County League in Division Two East.

== History ==
Gillingham Town Football Club was founded in 2010 by Richard Hasemore, Dave Hasemore, Darren Hasemore, and Paul Pickford; Pickford is the second great-grandson of William Pickford, a football administrator, who took part in the development of The Football Association. In the year of formation, they won the Quarter Century Cup for the 2010–11 season. In the 2016–17 season, the club was promoted to the Premier Division in The Rochester and District League. In the 2017–18 season the club won the Group A Sittingbourne and Milton Charity Cup. In 2019 the club was promoted to the Kent County League Division Three Central and East.

In 2019, Gilberto Silva Jr, the son of former Arsenal and Brazil player Gilberto Silva, joined the club. In 2020, former Arsenal player Denilson became an ambassador for the club. Eduardo da Silva, former Arsenal and Croatia player, also became a club ambassador and invested in the club. In 2025, Eduardo played as a special guest in the Gillingham Town friendly match against Royal Engineers Following the addition of Denilson and Eduardo, the team at one point had 14 Brazilian players in its first-team squad of 23 players, the most in any English football team.

In 2025, Gifton Noel-Williams, former striker for Watford, Stoke City and Bunley, joined the club as a voluntary development coach for the first team and youth team.

== Ground ==
Gillingham Town's first team play their home games at Garrison Sports Ground in Chatham, Kent. The Garrison Grounds are used by the sports teams of the Royal Engineers. In 2025, Gillingham Town forged links with Royal Engineers A.F.C. who offered their facilities for Gillingham Town to use. A pavilion which was recently built at Garrison Sports Ground was offered as a possible location for a community hub for Gillingham Town.

== Kit and badge ==
The club's primary colors are blue and black. The club badge features the clubs primary color blue, with the Kent county emblem of the White Horse of Kent. The club adopted the phrase "Frartes in Armis", originating from Latin meaning Brothers in Arms.

Due to Gillingham Town's ties with Brazil, the club has paired with sponsors and kit suppliers from Brazil, as well as display the Brazil flag on their shirts.

== Honours ==
- The Quarter Century Cup
  - Winners 2010–11
- Sittingbourne and Milton Charity Cup
  - Winners 2017–18

== Notable club officials ==
Name	Citizenship	Position	Background	Timeframe
Denílson	(Brazil)	Club ambassador, mentor	Former player for Arsenal, São Paulo	2020–present
Eduardo da Silva	(Brazil) (Croatia)	Club ambassador, honorary player	Former player for Arsenal, Shakhtar Donetsk, Croatia	2020–present
Lucho Nizzo	(Brazil) (Italy)	Mentor	Coach of Al-Nassr FC and various Brazilian football clubs.	2021–present
Gifton Noel-Williams	(England)	Player development coach	Former player for Watford F.C., Stoke City F.C. and Burnley F.C.	2025–present
