= Barry Bright =

British football administrator

Barry W. Bright (born c. 1946) is a retired Estate Agent, turned now professional football administrator: chair and Managing Director of the Kent Football Association; chair of The Football Association disciplinary committee; and a member of the FA Board as Vice-Chairman.

Bright was chairman of Sittingbourne F.C., where in March 1997 he had to announce that the club could not afford to pay the players wages. Midway through the 1998/9 season, Bright handed over Sittingbourne to Andy Spice.

Bright rose to the FA through his association with the Kent FA, where he is chair and Managing Director; he has been the Kent FA's representative to the Football Association for over 20 years. Bright is chair of the FA disciplinary committee, where with colleagues Peter Herd and Frank Pattison, he has handed down various conclusions, including:

- Boston United: pleaded guilty to six charges relating to contract irregularities. They were fined £100,000 and started the following season with a four points deduction.
- Rio Ferdinand: in 2003 Ferdinand failed to attend a drugs test, claiming he had forgotten because he was preoccupied with moving houses. Ferdinand was banned for eight-month ban from January 2004 at club and international level and a £50,000 fine, meaning he would miss the rest of the league season and some of the next along with all of Euro 2004. Manchester United's appeals to have the ban reduced were turned down.
- Simon Jordan: in 2005, following Jordan's article for the Guardian newspaper where he criticised refereeing standards, the disciplinary team headed by Bright handed down a £10,000 fine and gagging order on future articles on the subject.
- Paul Stretford: in 2007, the Court of Appeal ruled in favour of the FA and Bright in a 2002 decision re Stretford's acquisition of Wayne Rooney as a client, that the applied disciplinary proceedings did comply with article 6 of the European Convention on Human Rights, and that one of the FA rules was not unlawful restraint of trade.

Bright also inputs to various UEFA committee's, including the panel which cut one-year ban of Holland international Frank de Boer, for taking an anabolic steroid because it was satisfied that the drug was in a contaminated food supplement.
