= Stansfeld F.C. =

Association football club

Coordinates: 51.4506°N 0.03486°E

Stansfeld
- Full name: Stansfeld Football Club
- Founded: 1897
- Ground: Badgers Sports Ground, Eltham
- Chairman: Ian Rooney
- Manager: Billy Shinners
- League: Southern Counties East League Division One
- 2025–26: Southern Counties East League Premier Division, 18th of 19 (relegated)
Home colours	Away colours

Stansfeld Oxford & Bermondsey Club Football Club is a football club currently based in Eltham, Greater London, England. Playing as Stansfeld they are currently members of the Southern Counties East League Division One. The club also operate teams under the names Stansfeld O&B and Stansfeld O&B Reserves in the Kent County League.

== History ==
=== Stansfeld Oxford & Bermondsey ===
The club was established in 1897 by doctor and philanthropist John Stansfeld following the founding of his Oxford Medical Mission in Bermondsey, London. The club badge carries the word Fratres, Latin for brothers. The club initially played in local and district amateur football. They were runners-up in the inaugural 1920–21 season of the Rotherhithe & District League/

In 1949 the club joined the Premier Division of the Brockley & District League; which was renamed the South Eastern District League in 1952. Stansfield became one of its leading teams, reportedly losing only two competitive matches over two seasons, and were Premier Division champions in 1956–57. The club were members of the South East London Amateur League in the following 1957–58 season and won its Premier Division.

In 1958 the club joined Division Two of the Western Section of the Kent County League and won the division at their first attempt, going on to complete a league and cup double by winning the Division Two Challenge Cup. The club were promoted into the Premier Division, skipping Division One and two seasons later in 1961–62 were Premier Division runners-up and won the Premier Division Cup. They then won back-to-back Premier Division titles in 1962–63 and 1963–64, after which they were promoted to the Western Section's top tier, the Senior Division.

Stansfeld O&B were runners-up in the Senior Division in 1964–65 and again in 1969–70. The club finished bottom of the division in 1976–77 and were relegated to the Premier Division which they won in the 1977–78 season, earning promotion back to the Senior Division. They were runners-up in the Senior Division in 1980–81 and for seven seasons from 1984 were either champions (1984–85, 1986–87, 1988–89 and 1989–90) or runners-up (1985–86, 1987–88 and 1990–91 when they missed-out on a treble of championships on goal average). During this period the club won multiple trophies, winning the Kent County League Inter Regional Challenge (Bill Manklow) Cup in 1989–90 and 1991–92, the West Kent Challenge (Barry Bundock) Shield in 1985–86 and 1989–90; and the Senior Division Challenge cup for three consecutive years between 1985 and 1987.

The league was reorganised in 1992 and Stansfeld O&B were placed in the consolidated Premier Division. They won the division in 1994–95 and were runners-up in 2002–03. There was also cup success as the club won the Inter Regional Challenge (Bill Manklow) Cup in 2001–02 and 2002–03, requiring penalties after extra time to win on both occasions and for a cup double in 2002–03 won the Champions Trophy also after a penalty shoot-out decider. The club won the Kent Intermediate Challenge Shield in 2003–04 and 2006–07. Stansfeld O&B finished fourth in the Premier Division in 2006–07, but due to a three-year record of poor discipline, were demoted to Division One West. The club were Division One West runners-up in 2007–08 and earned an immediate promotion back to the Premier Division. They went on to win the Premier Division for a second time in 2009–10 and were runners-up in both 2011–12 and 2014–15.

In July 2016 the Stansfeld O&B organisation took-over Eltham Palace, who were members of Division One of the Southern Counties East League. They played as Eltham Palace for one season after which, to incorporate the club into the Stansfeld brand, the team was renamed. However owing to FA regulations existing clubs were forbidden from taking the place of higher ranked clubs so the name "Stansfeld" was used rather than "Stansfeld O&B". The Stansfeld O&B team remained members of the Kent County League Premier Division and in 2023–24 won the Inter Regional Challenge (Bill Manklow) Cup.

=== Stansfeld ===
In 2021–22 Stansfield were Southern Counties East League Division One champions, earning promotion to the Premier Division. In 2025–26 the club finished second-from-bottom of the Premier Division and were relegated back to Division One.

== Ground ==
From the takeover of Eltham Palace in 2016 the club played at Foxbury Avenue in Chislehurst, groundsharing with Glebe. In 2024 they relocated to groundshare with Cray Valley Paper Mills at the Badgers Sports Ground in Eltham.

== Honours ==
Stansfeld

- Southern Counties East League
  - Division One champions 2021–22

Stansfeld Oxford & Bermondsey

- Kent County League
  - Premier Division champions 1994–95, 2009–10
  - Western Section Senior Division champions 1984–85, 1986–87, 1988–89, 1989–90
  - Western Section Premier Division champions 1962–63, 1963–64, 1977–78
  - Western Section Division Two champions 1958–59
  - Inter Regional Challenge (Bill Manklow) Cup winners 1989–90, 1991–92, 2001–02, 2002–03, 2014–15, 2023–24
  - Champions Trophy winners 2002–03
  - West Kent Challenge (Barry Bundock) Shield winners 1985–86, 1989–90
  - Western Section Senior Challenge Cup winners 1984–85, 1985–86, 1986–87
  - Western Section Senior Section Cup winners 1969–70
  - Western Section Premier Division Cup winners 1961–62
  - Western Section Division Two Challenge Cup winners 1958–59
- South East London Amateur League
  - Premier Division champions 1957–58
- South Eastern District League
  - Premier Division champions 1956–57
- Kent Intermediate Challenge Shield
  - Winners 2003–04, 2006–07

== Records ==
- Best FA Cup performance: Preliminary round, 2020–21, 2022–23, 2023–24
- Best FA Vase performance: Fifth round, 2021–22
