= Sevenoaks Town F.C. =

Association football club in England

Coordinates: 51°17′27″N 0°12′07″E

Sevenoaks Town
- Full name: Sevenoaks Town Football Club
- Nickname: The Oaks
- Founded: 1883 (as Sevenoaks)
- Ground: Greatness Park; Sevenoaks; Kent
- Capacity: 1,150 (150 seated)
- Chairman: Paul Lansdale
- Manager: Marcel Nimani
- League: Isthmian League South East Division
- 2025–26: Isthmian League South East Division, 12th of 22
Home colours	Away colours

Sevenoaks Town F.C. is a football club based in Sevenoaks, Kent, England. They were established in 1883 and are currently members of the Isthmian League South East Division.

== History ==
Sevenoaks F.C. was originally formed in 1883 and was amongst the founder members of the original Kent League, although they left the league after just one season. It is known that on 26 April 1893 they played Royal Arsenal, who were at the time the only professional team in the South of England, with over 1,000 spectators watching the game.

In 1906 the club, became one of the founder members of the Sevenoaks League and except for two seasons in the Tonbridge League remained members until folding in 1938. The club reformed in 1946 but in 1951 they amalgamated with another local club, St. John's United, to form Sevenoaks United, taking the place of St. John's United in the Kent Amateur League (Western Region), which they won on two occasions. They changed their name to Sevenoaks Town in 1965 and amalgamated with Sevenoaks Social in 1975 to form Sevenoaks Town Social. However, after just one season the club reverted to Sevenoaks. In 1984 the Kent Amateur League was re-organised as the Kent County League, and Sevenoaks were the first Premier Division champions, a feat they repeated in seasons 1995–96 and 2002–03. The suffix Town was added in 1991. In 2003 the club stepped up to the Kent League, where, despite the step up to a significantly higher standard of football, they finished a commendable 11th in their first two seasons.

In season 2013–14 the Kent League renamed itself the Southern Counties East Football League and Sevenoaks Town transferred to the Premier Division. In 2017–18 the club were SCEFL champions and were promoted to the Isthmian League South East Division.

== Ground ==
Sevenoaks Town play their home games at Greatness Park, Mill Lane, Sevenoaks, Kent, TN14 5BX. The club installed a 3G pitch on their main playing surface in June 2017 which became known as The Bourne Stadium.

== Honours ==
- Southern Counties East League
  - Premier Division Winners: 2017–18
  - Premier Division Challenge Cup Winners: 2016–17
- Kent County League
  - Champions: 1984–85, 1995–96, 2002–03
- Kent Junior Cup winners: 1976–77, 1979–80
- Kent Intermediate Shield winners: 1985–86, 1993–94

== Records ==
- Best league position: 8th in Isthmian League South East 2022–23
- Best FA Cup performance: 4th qualifying round 2022–23
- Best FA Vase performance: 2nd round 2006-07 and 2017–18
- Best FA Trophy performance: 1st qualifying round 2018-19

== Sources ==
- Sevenoaks Town at the Football Club History Database
