= Woodstock Sports F.C. =

Association football club (defunct) in England

Coordinates: 51°18′54″N 0°43′46″E

Woodstock Sports
- Full name: Woodstock Sports Football Club
- Nickname: The Sports
- Founded: 1961 as Teynham & Lynsted
- Dissolved: 2015
- Ground: Woodstock Park; Sittingbourne, Kent
Home colours	Away colours

Woodstock Sports Football Club was an English football team based near Sittingbourne, Kent. The club was founded in 1961 as Teynham and Lynsted and following an amalgamation in 1998 were renamed Norton Sports. In 2011 shortly after relocating to Woodstock Park the club renamed itself as Woodstock Sports.

The original club played in local district leagues before, in 1989, joining the Kent County League. In 2008, playing as Norton Sports, the club was elected to the Kent League (which was subsequently renamed the Southern Counties East Football League). The club, struggling for financial backing, was dissolved in 2015.

== History ==
The forerunner club Teynham and Lynsted F.C. were founded in 1961 and joined the Sittingbourne League. In 1962 they were founder members of the newly formed Sittingbourne and Sheppey Combination. They joined at Division One level, however the following season they dropped to Division Two where they played until 1967 after which they returned to the top division. In 1970 Teynham & Lynsted switched to the Canterbury and District League, joining the league's Division Three. Following three straight promotions (including two championships in 1971 and 1972 and a fortunate uplift to replace a resigning club in 1973) the club climbed to the Canterbury and District League Premier Division for the 1973–74 season. The club were runners-up in the division over the 1977–78 season and again a decade later in 1987–1988 – in the latter season they won the league's Challenge Trophy. They retained the trophy in their final season in the league, 1988–89, and were beaten finalists in the Kent Junior Cup (Division A); however the main drama of the season was when league leaders Faversham Blues resigned from the league prior to their final match, a title decider against Teynham & Lynsted – which handed the title to the Teynham club.

In 1989 the club were accepted into the Kent County League and joined its Eastern Section Premier Division. After achieving the divisional runners-up position in their first season the club moved up to the league's Senior Division. In 1992 the Kent County League instigated a single non-geographic unified Premier Division in which Teynham & Lynsted were included; a season later, 1993–94, the club were champions of the division. Two seasons later in 1996 the club won the Kent County League Inter Regional Challenge Cup. After their 1994 league victory the club slid down the division over the next few seasons and finished bottom over the 1997–98 season and were relegated to Kent County League Division One (East).

In 1998 Teynham & Lynsted amalgamated with Norton Sports, a one time rival club based in the adjacent village of Norton; they had been established in 1927 and had played in various local leagues (Sittingbourne, Faversham, New Brompton, with some successes) and were currently members of the Premier Division of the Canterbury and District League (which Teynham had left nine seasons previously). Although Teynham & Lynsted were the major team, as the new combined club were to use Norton Park following the amalgamation, the club took the name Norton Sports. The amalgamated club inherited Teynham and Lynsted's place in the Kent County League and in their second season known as Norton Sports, 1999–2000, they were league champions and promoted to the league's Premier Division. The club survived only one season in the higher division; they finished bottom of the table and were relegated. After spending four seasons back in the Kent County League Division One (East) Norton Sports were champions in the 2004–05 season and promoted back to the league's Premier Division; additionally in 2005 they won the Eastern Section double by winning the Les Leckie Cup (the Eastern Section Challenge Cup). The following season the club won the Kent County League Inter Regional Challenge (Bill Manklow) Cup and subsequently won the league's Champions Cup (a league champions versus cup winners challenge). Three seasons later, 2007–08, under the management of Ben Taylor Norton Sports were champions of the Kent County League Premier Division, winning twenty-three and losing one of twenty-six matches league matches played over the season, scoring one hundred goals and conceding twenty-three (and again thereafter won the Champions Cup). Following this triumph the club applied and were elected to the Premier Division of the Kent League.

As the club's ground was below the standard required for the Kent League the club had to move away from Norton Park; they intended to move to Woodstock Park near Sittingbourne, but until that facility was sufficiently developed in 2008 they commenced a ground share with Herne Bay. After two seasons, in October 2010, the club moved-in to the now upgraded Woodstock Park. From the 2011–12 season the club changed their name to Woodstock Sports, linking the club to its new home.

As a member of the Kent League for five seasons the club occupied mid-table positions until the 2013–14 season (in which the league had been renamed the Southern Counties East Football League); after replacing their long-term manager Ben Taylor early in the campaign they finished adrift at the foot of the table having won only three and losing twenty-five of their thirty-two matches; they were reprieved from relegation owing to the planned increase in the number of clubs in the division. The following season, 2014–15 Woodstock Sports returned to a mid-table position of the division but, struggling for financial backing, the club folded at the end season.

In 2010, playing as Norton Sports, the club entered the FA Cup in which, after winning extra preliminary and preliminary round ties, they reached the first qualifying where they were eliminated 3–2 by Beckenham Town. As Woodstock Sports the club entered the competition twice more, in 2011 and 2014 but were eliminated on both occasions in the extra-preliminary round. Also between 2009 and 2015 (excluding 2012, when the club failed to meet ground grading requirements and were barred) they competed in the FA Vase where they were eliminated in either the first or second qualifying round except in 2011 when, after victories in the two qualifying rounds, in the first round proper they were heavily defeated 5–0 at Ringmer.

== Colours and crest ==
After the amalgamation of Teynham & Lynsted and Norton Sports, the club's home strip comprised Argentina blue and white striped shirts with black shorts. In the summer of 2013 Woodstock Sports adopted an all navy blue home kit; all red was the template used for away shirts and shorts.

The Norton Sports crest comprised a roundel with the clubs name around the circumference enclosing a total of seven pale blue and white vertical stripes with a blue star in a white square in the upper left quadrant. After moving to Woodstock Park the club used as its crest the coat of arms of Old Oak F.C., a long-time resident club of the ground, with "Woodstock" replacing the wording "Old Oak F.C." on the shield. The Latin motto at the bottom of the crest translates as "From little acorns" (the first part of a proverb that continues "the mighty oak will grow").

== Stadium ==
The final home stadium of Woodstock Sports FC was Woodstock Park, Broadoak Road, Sittingbourne, Kent, ME9 8AG.

The club's forerunner, Teynham & Lynsted played on the newly developed Playing Field off Frognall Lane in Teynham. After amalgamation with Norton Sports in 1998 the club moved to the latters Norton Park ground which precipitated their name change to Norton Sports.

The Kent league, which Norton Sports joined in 2008, required better facilities (including floodlights) than were available at Norton Park. The club intended to move to Woodstock Park, however this facility was not yet of the standard required and the club spent two seasons as a groundsharing tenant at Winch's Field the home of Herne Bay F.C. After significant development at Woodstock Park, partly funded by the Football Stadia Improvement Fund, the club moved there in 2010 to join Kent County League club Woodstock Park F.C. who were already resident.

In 2013 the town's largest club Sittingbourne F.C., then of the Isthmian League, moved to Woodstock Park, sharing it with Woodstock Sports F.C. (until their demise in 2015); at this time the Woodstock Park FC club began using a second pitch at the complex.

The western part of the stadium incorporates parking and houses a social club with licensed food and refreshment facilities (with additional refreshment facilities available elsewhere on the ground), changing rooms, physio room and offices with hard standing leading to the playing surface. During the 2012–13 season a covered stand with seating for 150 was installed on the south end of the pitch. Hardstanding and a small covered stand over the terracing (moved from Bourne Park Stadium in the summer of 2013) and a toilet block stands are on the northern end with the eastern side of the stadium housing the dugouts only. The floodlights are erected on four pylons, two on each side of the ground.

== Honours ==
Honour	No.	Years
Canterbury and District League
Division One champions	1	1988–1989*
Division Two champions	1	1971–72*
Division Three champions	1	1970–71*
Challenge Trophy winners	2	1987–1988*, 1988–1989*
Kent County League
Premier Division champions	2	1993–94*, 2007–08†
Division One (East) champions	2	1999–2000†, 2004–05†
Champions Trophy winners	2	2006–07†, 2008–09†
Inter-Regional Challenge Cup winners	2	1995–96*, 2005–06†
Eastern Section (Les Leckie) Cup winners	1	2004–05†
Floodlight Cup East winners	1	1995–96*
source: Kent County League: History (archived)
Notes: *As Teynham & Lynsted; †As Norton Sports

== Records ==
- Highest League Position: 8th in Kent League 2011–12
- F.A Cup best Performance: First qualifying round 2010–11
- F.A. Vase best performance: First round 2011–12
