= Kent County League =

Association football league in Kent, England

Kent County Football League
- Country: England
- Divisions: 5
- Number of clubs: 79
- Level on pyramid: Level 11 (Premier Division)
- Promotion to: Southern Counties East League Division One
- Relegation to: Ashford and District League; Bromley & South London Football League; Canterbury & District League; Rochester & District League; Sevenoaks & District League
- Current champions: Hawkinge Town (2025–26)
- Website: Official website

The Kent County Football League (known as the Kent County League) is a football competition based in Kent, England and adjacent area.

The league was founded in 1922 as the Kent Amateur Football League and comprised Eastern and Western sections which functioned and were administered separately. In 1984 the league renamed itself the Kent County Football League. A single mixed Eastern and Western sections Premier Division was formed in 1992 and three years later, in 1995, the league adopted a single Management Committee. The league is a Regional Feeder League into the National League System step 6 Division One of the Southern Counties East League.

== 2026–27 season ==
For the 2026–27 season the league (excluding the veterans section) comprises 79 teams formed into five divisions – a Premier Division; two regional Divisions One, Central & East and West; and two regional Divisions Two, Central & East and West.

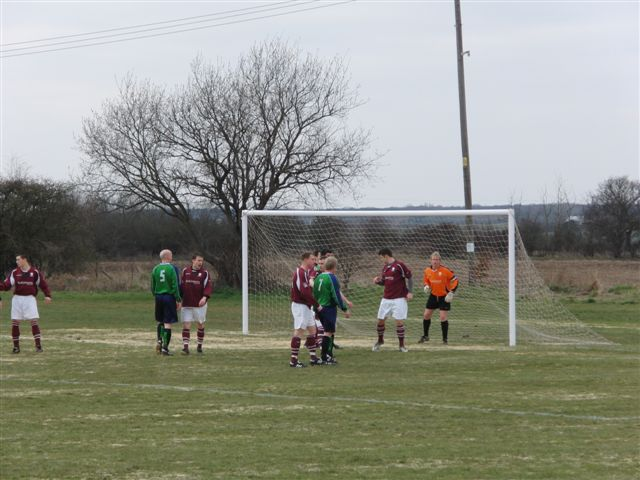
A Premier Division match between Canterbury City and Snodland in 2010

=== Premier Division ===
- AC Ashford
- AMG Ballerz
- Aylesford
- Cuxton 1991
- Equinoccial
- Falconwood
- FC Revo
- Hawkinge Town
- Kent United
- Kings Hill
- Long Lane
- Meridian VP
- Metrogas
- New Romney
- Snodland Town Reserves
- Sporting Club Thamesmead Reserves
- Stansfeld O&BC
- Tenterden Town

=== Division One Central & East ===
- AFC Rangers
- Bocca Juniors
- Borden Village
- Canterbury City
- Chilham
- Cinque Ports
- Dover Rangers
- FC Anchorians
- Guru Nanak
- Kings Hill Reserves
- Ramsgate Athletic
- Rochester City
- Sittingbourne Valley
- Smeeth & Brabourne
- Turnbridge Wells Foresters
- Woodnesborough

=== Division One West ===
- Bermondsey Town
- Bexley
- FC Greenwich
- Fleetdown United
- Greenwich Allstars
- Halls AFC Reserves
- Ide Hill
- Old Roan
- Orpington
- Otford United
- Parkwood Rangers
- Peckham Town
- Sevenoaks Town Reserves
- South East Athletic
- Stansfeld O&BC Reserves
- The Charcoal

=== Division Two Central & East ===
- AFC Gravesend
- Barming
- Baypoint
- Canterbury Eagles
- Charing
- Cuxton 1991 Reserves
- Deal Town Youth
- Faversham Strike Force Reserves
- Gillingham Town
- Kemsing
- Larkfield & New Hythe Reserves
- Littlebourne
- Margate Reserves
- Minster Reserves
- Paddock Wood

=== Division Two West ===
- AFC Bethwin
- AFC Lewisham
- Agenda
- Bridon Ropes Reserves
- Bromleians
- Bromley Reserves
- Dartford Celtic
- Dulwich Village
- Falconwood Reserves
- Farnborough Old Boys Guild
- Fleetdown United Reserves
- Long Lane U23
- Northumberland Heath
- Rotherhithe

== League history ==
The Kent Amateur Football League was founded in 1922 with the inaugural season being 1922–23. The league consisted of two separate groupings, the Western and Eastern sections, each with their own management committee: the Western comprised a single junior status division with 14 clubs and the Eastern a Senior Division (with 3 clubs) together with a junior status Division One (with 7 clubs). At their 1924 Annual General Meeting the Kent FA referred to the Eastern Senior Division as the Eastern Section of the Kent League; this division ceased to be part of the Kent Amateur League the following season.

The Western section expanded to two divisions in 1925 and from 1927 their top division clubs voted to change from junior to senior status. The section expanded to three divisions in 1932 and four in 1934 at which time they were renamed with the former Division One renamed the Premier Division and the others were numbered in sequence Divisions One, Two and Three. The league continued with this format until the 1938–39 season, their last before the outbreak of the Second World War.

The Eastern section reduced to a single division in its second season and then ceased for three seasons before reforming as an intermediate status division in 1928. This division was upgraded to senior status in 1934 at which time a junior status second division was added. The league competition was suspended in autumn 1939 and reconstituted as a wartime league comprising two divisions for the 1939–40 season.

For two seasons between 1935 and 1937 there was a third section of the Kent Amateur League, the Mid-Kent section which was administered by the Western section committee. This was the discontinued Kent League Division Two from the 1934–35 season and it returned to that league grouping in 1937.

The Western section recommenced in 1944 with a single Division One and two seasons later in 1946 returned to a Premier Division, Division One and Division Two format. The latter division ceased for the following campaign before being reformed in 1951. Three seasons later in 1954 the structure expanded to four divisions with a Senior Division being inserted above the section's Premier Division. This new division was established to provide a competition for senior status Amateur clubs and included seven of the fourteen clubs from the previous season's Premier Division, plus promoted Slade Green Athletic, together with a three additional clubs from higher ranked leagues (Bowater Lloyds from the Kent League and Aylesford Paper Mills and Royal Naval Depot Chatham from the London League). The Western section continued in this configuration until 1992.

The Eastern section began again after World War Two in 1945 with two parallel regional divisions which continued for three seasons. The divisions were designated East and West in the 1945–46 season and North and South for the remaining two seasons; the Eastern section champion was decided by an inter-region championship match between each seasons' divisional winners. For the eleven seasons between 1948 until 1959 the league had only a single division before, for the 1959–60 season, again operating two parallel North and South divisions (with championship play-off). This was a precursor to the formation of two divisions in 1960, a Premier Division comprising the higher ranked teams from the two regional divisions of the previous season and Division one for the remainder. In 1962 the Eastern section expanded to three divisions with the addition of Division Two and the section remained in this configuration through to 1973, when the lower division was discontinued for four seasons before being reinstated in 1977. The structure altered in 1984 when the section, similar to its Western counterpart, inserted a Senior Division (which accepted both senior and stronger non-senior clubs) above a reconstituted Premier Division and Division One. The new Senior Division comprised a total of eleven clubs, six from the previous season's Premier Division, three from Division one and two from Division two. After one further season, in 1985, the now lowest ranked Division One was discontinued. Thereafter the section continued with Senior and Premier Divisions until 1992.

In 1984 there were significant changes to the league organisation: common rules were adopted across the two sections (essentially those of the Western section); a joint management committee comprising five members from each section was appointed; and the teams in the Senior Division, if not of senior status were given intermediate status. These changes made the league a more combined body and it renamed itself the Kent County Football League. There was establishment and publication of rules concerning promotion into and relegation from the Senior Divisions which hitherto had been a virtual closed-shop in favour of the senior status clubs.

The league began an inter-section cup competition in 1987 with teams form the top two divisions of both the Eastern and Western sections eligible to participate, it was named initially for the league's new sponsors as the ARC Cup; it has subsequently been named the Bill Manklow Inter-regional Challenge Cup.

The integration within the league proceeded further in 1992 with the removal of the two sections' top Senior Divisions replaced by a single Kent County League Premier Division with regional numerically designated divisions below. The new single division included fourteen clubs: ten from the Western section (nine from the Senior Division plus the current Premier Division champions), three from the Senior Division of the Eastern section and one (Thames Polytechnic) who had been ejected from the Kent League after failing to meet ground grading requirements. The clubs in the single Premier and two sectional Division One leagues were designated at least of intermediate status (with clubs hitherto of senior status remaining so). Each section continued to operate their own structure below the new combined division with promotion and relegation through the whole hierarchy, including into the Premier Division.

In 1993, a year after the formation of the amalgamated single Premier Division, an accord was reached that recognised the division as a feeder to the Kent League. For clubs that wished to take the step up and that had facilities meeting the grading requirements promotion for a single club was set to commence from the 1995–96 season. There had over the years been a trickle of progressive and ambitious Kent Amateur/County League teams being elected to the Kent League, however VCD Athletic in 1997 were the first team to be promoted as Kent County League champions in line with the feeder initiative (albeit Hythe United and Lordswood, neither of whom were league winners, had exploited a loophole and been accepted into the Kent League over the previous two seasons).

The league streamlined its administration in 1995 when it scrapped the separate Western and Eastern Management Committees and adopted a single committee across the whole league.

In 2011 to fill a gap in the National League System between the Kent County League, a regional feeder league, and the step 5 Kent League a new league at step 6, the Kent Invicta League, was created – this took fourteen clubs from the Kent County League (nine from the Premier League, three from the two Division One leagues and two from Division Two West). Over the next two seasons, beginning 2011–12, the numerically reduced Kent County League operated with a single Division One below its heavily reconstituted Premier Division but maintained two regional Division Two leagues.

In 2013 the league restructured, not only returning to an Eastern and Western Division One, but added two regional Division Three leagues (a renaming of the existing two Reserve Divisions); additionally Premier Division clubs were mandated to ensure, by the end of the 2013-14 season, that their facilities met FA Step 7 grade standard or face relegation. From 2016 the East divisions were renamed the Central & East divisions. In 2023 the Central & East Division Three was discontinued however the number of divisions remained constant as the Central & East Division Two was divided into separate Central and East divisions. The Division Three West division was discontinued in 2024 and from the 2024-25 season the separate East and West cup competitions for the division two level clubs were discontinued and replaced by a single competition, the Leckie Family Cup. With effect from the 2026-27 the league reduced to five divisions with the Division Two Central and Division Two East amalgamated into a single combined Division Two Central & East.

=== Promotion and relegation ===
Prior to 1984 the existence of Senior Divisions (which included stronger non-senior clubs) had inhibited annual merit based promotion into these top divisions; either ballots of the division's clubs generally decided to maintain the status quo rather than vote out existing clubs, or the no relegation status of the senior clubs maintained their position in the divisions. From 1984 promotion rules were established (which limited the no relegation protection to reserve sides of clubs in higher ranked leagues) and in 1993 the adoption of a single joint Premier Division created a pathway for progressive clubs to move through the regional divisions and into the Kent County League's top Premier Division and further up the Football pyramid.

The Kent County League had become a feeder to the Kent League in the mid 1990s but few clubs had taken the step up and none were relegated downwards on footballing merit. The trickle of clubs taking promotion gained pace in the 2000s however there was a gap in the National League System between the Kent County League, at notional step 7, and the Kent League at step 5. This was rectified in 2011 with the founding, primarily with clubs from the Kent County League, of the step 6 Kent Invicta League. The Kent County League then became a Regional Feeder League into this new league and its successor (following amalgamation), Division One of the Southern Counties East League.

The feeder leagues for the Kent County League itself are smaller district leagues, these being the Ashford and District League, Bromley and South London Football League, Canterbury & District League, Rochester & District League and Sevenoaks & District League.

=== Sponsorship ===
The league has had headline sponsors/partners since 1987 (except for the 1993–94 season). The sponsorship deals are usually enacted during the summer close season.

- 1987–1990: Sponsors were Amey Roadstone Company, a building aggregates business, and the league known as the ARC Kent County League.
- 1990–1993: Sponsors were Tonbridge based music instrument and sheet music business FCN Music with the league known as FCN Music Kent County League. In 1993 the option to renew was not taken by the company and for a single season, 1993–94, the league had no headline sponsor.
- 1994–1998: Sponsored by Nuclear Electric, the electricity generation business who operated the power station at Dungeness; the league was titled the Nuclear Electric Kent County League. The company extended their initial three season deal.
- 1998–2008: Following the amalgamation of Nuclear Electric with British Energy the league took the title the British Energy Kent County League. The company renewed the sponsorship deal several times, the last occasion in 2006 attributed to the life extension of the Dungeness B nuclear power station.
- 2008–2011: Titled the Vandanel Kent County Football League for three seasons the sponsorship was provided by the Vandanel sports teamwear brand.
- 2011–2014: The Colchester based Estate Agents Spicer Haart, who had offices around Kent were title sponsor with the league named the Haart of Kent County League.
- 2014–2016: Named the NRG Gyms Kent County League. sponsorship was from the eponymously named fitness centre business.
- 2016–2018: Two companies combined to provide sponsorship, Andreas Carter Sports sportswear and Joma sports equipment, with the league adopting the title the Andreas Carter Sports Joma Kent County League.
- 2018–2020: The joint sponsorship by Joma ceased and the league was named the Andreas Carter Kent League.
- 2020 – : The NRG gyms business returned as sponsor and the league was titled the NRG 24HR Gym Kent County League

== Honours list ==
=== Divisional Champions ===
==== 1923–1992 ====
===== Western section =====
Season	Division 1	Division 2	Division 3	
1923–24	Imperial Paper Mills			
1924–25	Swanley Athletic			
1925–26	Foots Cray	Sydenham Wells		
1926–27	Lamorbey Athletic	Butler's Wharf		
1927–28	Swanley Athletic	Sydenham Wells		
1928–29	Swanley Athletic	Pioneer Athletic		
1929–30	Swanley Athletic	Pioneer Athletic		
1930–31	Bexley	Millwall Loco		
1931–32	Bexley	Millwall Loco		
1932–33	Swanley	Brent School Old Boys	Cray Valley Paper Mills	
1933–34	Swanley	Farnborough	Sidcup Council	
	Premier Division	Division 1	Division 2	Division 3
There was a simple renaming of the divisions: Division 1 to Premier Division etc. and an additional division
1934–35	Darenth Training Colony	London Paper Mills "A"	Chislehurst Old Boys	Longlands
1935–36	Gravesend United	London Paper Mills A	Chislehurst Old Boys	Wilmington Sports
1936–37	Darenth Training Colony	Brent School Old Boys	White Horse	Old Heathians
1937–38	Royal Marines	White Horse	Trojans	White Horse Reserves
1938–39	Darenth Park	White Horse	White Horse Reserves	Chelsfield Valley
The league was suspended at the outbreak of World War II
1944–45		Northumberland Heath YC		
1945–46		Sidcup United		
1946–47	Chatham	Churchfields Old Boys	Clesco (Dartford)	
1947–48	Foots Cray Social	J and E Halls		
1948–49	Thameside Amateurs	Crockenhill		
1949–50	Foots Cray Social	Brentstonians		
1950–51	Rochester	Klingers Social		
1951–52	Thameside Amateur Athletic	Upton Athletic	Bell Invicta	
1952–53	Bakers Sports	Saints Athletic	Slade Green Athletic	
1953–54	Crockenhill	Slade Green Athletic	Eltham Royals	
	Senior Division	Premier Division	Division 1	Division 2
Many of the Premier Division clubs were allocated senior status; a new Senior Division was introduced and minor changes to membership of the other divisions occurred (this was not a renaming of divisions)
1954–55	Bakers Sports	Brentstonians	Dusseks Sports	Mottingham
1955–56	Bakers Sports	Churchfields Old Boys	Mottingham	Gough Cooper Sports
1956–57	Crockenhill	Mottingham	Cray Social	Brentstonians Reserves
1957–58	Brentstonians	Mottingham	Klingers Social	David Evans
1958–59	Brentstonians	Tunnel Sports	Longlands Athletic	Stansfeld O&BC
1959–60	Aylesford Paper Mills	Beckenham Social	Greenfield Sports	Borough Green
1960–61	Slade Green Athletic	Beckenham Social	G.E.C. (Erith)	Slade Green Athletic Reserves
1961–62	Swanley	Borough Green	B.O.C.M.	Greenfield Sports Reserves
1962–63	R.O.F.S.A.	Stansfeld O&BC	Tunnel Sports Reserves	Lanbrook
1963–64	Aylesford Paper Mills	Stansfeld O&BC	Greenfield Sports Reserves	L.E.S.S.A.
1964–65	Callenders Athletic	Harland Social	L.E.S.S.A.	Halstead
1965–66	Kent Police	Alpine United	Brentstonians Reserves	Gateway
1966–67	Kent Police	Alpine United	Gateway	Plumstead Casuals
1967–78	Borough Green	Tunnel Sports Reserves	Plumstead Casuals	Plum Lane
1968–69	Old Saxonians	Sevenoaks Town	Halstead United	Sutton Athletic
1969–70	B.O.C.M.	Plum Lane	Sutton Athletic	Hoo Institute
1970–71	Plum Lane	Sutton Athletic	Hoo Institute	Eastcourt United Reserves
1971–72	Callenders Athletic	Hoo Institute	Northcote Invicta	Swanscombe United
1972–73	Dockland Settlement	Eastcourt United	Swanscombe United	Ex Blues
1973–74	Fisher Athletic	Swanscombe United	Samuel Montague Boys Club	Elliotts Social
1974–75	Fisher Athletic	Samuel Montague Boys Club	Elliotts Social	Empire Paper Mills
1975–76	Old Saxonians	Sevenoaks Town Social	Seal	Cuxton Social
1976–77	Sutton Athletic	Swanscombe United	Dusseks Social	Ex Blues
1977–78	Fisher Athletic Reserves	Stansfeld O&BC	Town Social	Samuel Montague Boys Club
1978–79	Maidstone United Reserves	Invicta	I.T.T. Footscray	Eccles
1979–80	Samuel Montague Old Boys	Elliotts Social	Bowater Sports	Oakwood Hospital
1980–81	Sevenoaks	Bowater Sports	Ex Blues	AFC Eltham
1981–82	Fisher Athletic Reserves	Oakwood Hospital	VCD Athletic	Winget
1982–83	Sevenoaks	Swanscombe United	West Malling Club	Bearsted
1983–84	Old Saxonians	Otford United	Bearsted	Rusthall
1984–85	Stansfeld O&BC	VCD Athletic	Rusthall	Royal George
1985–86	Bowater Scott Sports & Social	Hawkhurst United	Royal George	Chatham Amateurs
1986–87	Stansfeld O&BC	Bearsted	Paddock Wood Town	Edenbridge United
1987–88	Bearsted	Reed International	New Eltham	Hollingbourne
1988–89	Stansfeld O&BC	Greenways	Swanscombe United	Colts 85
1989–90	Stansfeld O&BC	Eynsford	Westerham	Ten Em Bee
1990–91	Oakwood	Aylesford Paper Mills	Platt United	Lordswood Reserves
1991–92	Oakwood	Knockholt	Wellcome (Saturday)	Strood County

source=Kent County Football League: Western Section Division Champions 1924–1992

===== Mid-Kent Section =====
Season	Mid-Kent
1935–36	Chatham
1936–37	Aylesford Paper Mills Reserves

source: Kent County Football League: Mid-Kent Section Division Champions 1935–1937

===== Eastern Section =====
Season	Senior Division	Division 1	
1923–24	Dover United	Northdown	
The Senior Division was discontinued after one season
	Division 1	Division 2	
1924–25	Grenville		
1928–29	Depot Royal Marines Deal		
1928–29	3rd Carabiniers (Canterbury)		
1930–31	Betteshanger Colliery Welfare		
1931–32	Ashford "A"		
1932–33	RAF Manston		
1933–34	Chartham Mental Hospital		
1934–35	Ramsgate Grenville	St Paul's Old Boys	
1935–36	Dover	St Paul's Old Boys	
1936–37	Dover	Hythe	
1937–38	Dover	Hythe	
1938–39	RAF Manston	Bekesbourne	
The league was suspended and was replaced for one season by a wartime league
	Division 1 North	Division 1 South	
1939–40	Bobby's Athletic Club	Eythorne Sports	
	Division 1 East	Division 1 West	Inter-region Champions
The section resumed with two parallel regional divisions and a championship play-off
1945–46	HMS Robertson	4th Coast Training Regiment	HMS Robertson
	Division 1 North	Division 1 South	Inter-region Champions
1946–47	Brett Sports	Folkestone Town Reserves	Brett Sports
1947–48	Chislet Colliery Welfare	47 Coast Training Regiment	Chislet Colliery Welfare
	Division 1		
The section comprised a single division
1948–49	Royal Marines Deal		
1949–50	Royal Marines Deal		
1950–51	Cheriton		
1951–52	Cheriton		
1952–53	Royal Marines Deal		
1953–54	Chislet Colliery Welfare		
1954–55	Birchington		
1955–56	Cheriton		
1956–57	Birchington		
1957–58	Birchington		
1958–59	Birchington		
	Division 1 North	Division 1 South	Inter-region Champions
The section comprised two parallel regional divisions with a championship play-off
1959–60	Birchington	Dover Wanderers	Birchington
	Premier Division	Division 1	Division 2
The regional divisions split on merit into hierarchical divisions
1960–61	Whitstable Town	Royal Marines Deal	
1961–62	Dover Wanderers	Eastry	
1962–63	Dover Wanderers	Tilmanstone Colliery Welfare	Broomfield United
1963–64	Dover Wanderers	Waverley	Folkestone Pegasus
1964–65	Dover Wanderers	George Stone	Deal "A"
1965–66	Brett Sports	New Romney	Dover Wanderers Reserves
1966–67	Dover Wanderers	Hythe Albion	Dymchurch
1967–68	Sandwich Town	Dover Wanderers Reserves	Crabble Athletic
1968–69	Northcliffe	Crabble Athletic	Royal Marines Deal
1969–70	Lydd Town	Folkestone Invicta	Hammers
1970–71	Lydd Town	Ashford Dynamo	North Deal United
1971–72	Ashford Dynamo	Hythe Town	Betteshanger Colliery Welfare
1972–73	Ashford Dynamo	Deal Town Reserves	Dymchurch
1973–74	Hythe Town	Dymchurch	
1974–75	Hythe Town	Aylesham United	
1975–76	Hythe Town	Brett Waverley	
1976–77	Northcliffe & Dormobile	Walmer Rovers	
1977–78	Northcliffe & Dormobile	Betteshanger Colliery Welfare	Margate Reserves
1978–79	Folkestone Invicta	Whitstable Old Boys	St Margarets
1979–80	New Romney	Sturry	Bromley Green
1980–81	New Romney	Bromley Green	Margate Reserves
1981–82	Ashford Dynamo	Thanet United Reserves	Ramsgate Reserves
1982–83	New Romney	Hamstreet	Rank, Hovis McDougall
1983–84	Bromley Green	Rank, Hovis McDougall	University of Kent
Season	Senior Division	Premier Division	Division 1
A Senior Division was introduced taking clubs predominately from the previous Premier Division but also from Division One and Two (this was not a renaming of divisions)
1984–85	New Romney	Lydd Town	New Romney Reserves
1985–86	Sturry	Wittersham	
1986–87	New Romney	Walmer Rovers	
1987–88	New Romney	Walmer	
1988–89	New Romney	Phoenix Rovers	
1989–90	Lydd Town	Kennington	
1990–91	Lydd Town	Hythe Town Reserves	
1991–92	Lydd Town	Broomfield United	

source=Kent County Football League: Eastern Section Division Champions 1924–1992

==== 1992– ====
Major restructuring combined the Western and Eastern Senior Divisions into one Premier Division. The regional divisions below were sequentially numbered.

Season	Premier Division	D1 East	D1 West	D2 East	D2 West	D3 West	D4 West
1992–93	Sevenoaks Town	Lydd Town	Ex Blues	New Romney Reserves	Strood County	Empire	
1993–94	Teynham & Lynsted	Lydd Town	Ten Em Bee	Lydd Town Reserves	Sutton Athletic	Tonbridge Rangers	Maidstone Invicta
1994–95	Stansfeld O&BC	Milton Athletic	AFC Egerton	Royal George	Maidstone Invicta	Halstead	
1995–96	Sevenoaks Town	Tenterden St. Michaels	Ex Blues	Broomfield United Reserves	Snodland	Hawkenbury	
1996–97	VCD Athletic	Rye United	Bearsted	Broomfield United Res.	Otford United	Wickham Park	
1997–98	Milton Athletic	New Romney	Snodland	Rye United Reserves	Wickham Park	St. George's (Wrotham)	
1998–99	Knatchbull	Kennington	Maidstone United	Wittersham	St. George's (Wrotham)	Pembury	
1999–2000	Snodland	Norton Sports	Phoenix Sports	Smarden	AFC Blackheath	Belvedere	
2000–01	Bearsted	New Romney	Crockenhill	New Romney Reserves	Oakwood	Danson Athletic	
2001–02	Bearsted	Kennington	Old Roan	Dover Gate	Belvedere	Farnborough Old Boys Guild	
2002–03	Sevenoaks Town	Tenterden Tigers	Cray Valley Paper Mills	Tyler Hill	Bromleians Sports	Lanes End	
2003–04	Crockenhill	Bromley Green	Lewisham Borough	Borden Village	Orpington	Guru Nanak	
2004–05	Cray Valley Paper Mills	Norton Sports	Rusthall	Hollands & Blair	Phoenix Sports	disbanded	
2005–06	Lewisham Borough	Hollands & Blair	Holmesdale	Staplehurst	Westerham		
2006–07	Holmesdale	Tyler Hill	Orpington	Guru Nanak	Tudor Sports		
2007–08	Norton Sports	Bly Spartans	Phoenix Sports	Canterbury City	Farnborough Old Boys Guild		
2008–09	Hollands & Blair	Canterbury City	Tonbridge Invicta	Premier	Old Bexleians		
2009–10	Stansfeld O&BC	Woodstock Park	Charlton Athletic Community	Bredhurst Juniors	Forest Hill Park		
2010–11	Hollands & Blair	Bromley Green	Farnborough Old Boys Guild	Saga Sports & Social	Hildenborough Athletic		
	Premier Division	Division One		Division Two East	Division Two West		
Fourteen clubs left to form the Kent Invicta League, with fewer clubs the league operated a single non-regional Division One
2011–12	Bromley Green	Hildenborough Athletic		Maidstone Association Local Government Officers	Bexleians		
2012–13	Hildenborough Athletic	Fleetdown United		Sevenoaks	Peckham Town		
	Premier Division	Division One East	Division One West	Division Two East	Division Two West	Division Three East	Division Three West
The league returned to two regional Division One divisions
2013–14	Metrogas	Guru Nanak	Holland Sports	East Kent College	Phoenix Sports Reserves	Hawkinge Town	Stansfeld O&BC Reserves
2014–15	Metrogas	Faversham Strike Force	Halstead United	Lydd Town Reserves	Stansfeld O&BC Reserves	Kings Hill	Lewisham Athletic
2015–16	Faversham Strike Force	Lydd Town Reserves	Farnborough OB Guild	Kings Hill	Lewisham Athletic	Willesborough Athletic	South East Athletic
	Premier Division	Division One Central & East	Division One West	Division Two Central & East	Division Two West	Division Three Central & East	Division Three West
The East divisions were renamed Central & East divisions
2016–17	Punjab United	New Romney	Lewisham Athletic	Cuxton 91	Old Bromlenians	Wateringbury	Sydenham Sports
2017–18	Kennington	Kings Hill	Old Bromlenians	Wateringbury	Welling Town	AEI Sports	Sporting Club Thamesmead Reserves
2018–19	Staplehurst Monarchs United	K Sports Reserves	Ide Hill	Ashford	Red Velvet	Sturry	Tudor Sports Reserves
2019–20	(Season abandoned owing to COVID-19 pandemic)						
2020–21	(Season abandoned owing to COVID-19 pandemic)						
2021–22	Red Velvet	Tenterden Town	Chipstead	West Farleigh	Long Lane	West Kingsdown	Falconwood
2022–23	Borden Village	Cuxton 91	Bexley	Deal Town Reserves	Falconwood	Kings Hill Reserves	AMG Ballerz
	Premier Division	Division One Central & East	Division One West	Division Two East	Division Two West	Division Two Central	Division Three West
2023–24	Halls Athletic	Deal Town Reserves	Sporting Club Thamesmead Reserves	FC Revo	AMG Ballerz	Aylesford	Agenda
2024–25	New Romney	Aylesford	Falconwood	Bocca Juniors	Farnborough; Old Boys Guild	Upchurch	
2025–26	Hawkinge Town	AC Ashford	AMG Ballerz	Smeeth & Brabourne	Old Roan	Sevenoaks Town Reserves	

sources=Kent County Football League: Kent County League Division Champions 1993 to date; The FA: Kent County Football League

=== Cup Winners ===
The winners of the principal cup competitions.

Season	Inter Regional Challenge Cup (Bill Manklow Cup)	West Kent Challenge Shield (Barry Bundock Challenge Shield)	Eastern Section Challenge Cup (Les Leckie Cup)
1955–56		Bakers Sports	
1956–57		Crockenhill	
1957–58		Brentstonians	
1958–59		Mottingham	
1959–60		Slade Green Athletic	Ashford Town "A"
1960–61		R. O. F. S. A.	Royal Marines Deal
1961–62		Bexley	Eastry
1962–63		(Not completed, weather disrupted)	
1963–64		Swanley	Dover Wanderers
1964–65		Brentstonians	Dover Wanderers
1965–66		Slade Green Athletic	Lydd
1966–67		Tunnel Sports	Brett Sports
1967–68		Tunnel Sports	Birchington
1968–69		Tunnel Sports	Dover Wanderers
1969–70		Westerham	Hammers
1970–71		Dockland Settlement	Ashford Dynamo
1971–72		Callenders Athletic	Lydd
1972–73		Callenders Athletic	Deal Town Reserves
1973–74		Fisher Athletic	Crabble Athletic
1974–75		Eastcourt United	Hythe Town Reserves
1975–76		Old Saxonians	Ashford Dynamo
1976–77		Dartford Reserves	Northcliffe & Dormobile
1977–78		Sevenoaks	Nonington College
1978–79		Dartford Reserves	Brett Waverley
1979–80		Maidstone United	New Romney
1980–81		Bromley Reserves	New Romney
1981–82		(Not completed, weather disrupted)	New Romney
1982–83		Welling United	Rank Hovis McDougall
1983–84		Erith & Belvedere	Bromley Green
1984–85		(Not completed, weather disrupted)	Bromley Green
1985–86		Stansfeld O&BC	New Romney
1986–87		Fisher Athletic Reserves	University of Kent
1987–88	New Romney	Vickers Crayford	Lydd Town
1988–89	Greenways	Maidstone United	Lydd Town
1989–90	Stansfeld O&BC	Stansfeld O&BC	Lydd Town
1990–91	Bearsted	Oakwood	Folkestone Invicta
1991–92	Stansfeld O&BC	Bromley	Lydd Town
1992–93	Oakwood	Bromley	Lydd Town
1993–94	Bearsted	Maidstone Invicta	Lydd Town
1994–95	VCD Athletic	Ex Blues	Milton Athletic
1995–96	Teynham & Lynsted	Phoenix Sports	Tenterden & St Michaels United
1996–97	Bearsted	Wickham Park	Rye United
1997–98	Sevenoaks Town	Wickham Park	Rye United
1998–99	Sevenoaks Town	Maidstone United	Knatchbull
1999–2000	Sheerness East	Beauwater	Knatchbull
2000–01	Snodland	Old Roan	Sheerness East
2001–02	Stansfeld O&BC	Cray Valley Paper Mills	Milton Athletic
2002–03	Stansfeld O&BC	Oakwood	Lydd Town
2003–04	Cray Valley Paper Mills	Rusthall	Bromley Green
2004–05	Orpington	Phoenix Sports	Norton Sports
2005–06	Norton Sports	Fleetdown United	Sheppey United
2006–07	Bly Spartans	Orpington	Ashford Borough
2007–08	Fleet Leisure	Phoenix Sports	Bly Spartans
2008–09	Hollands & Blair	Tudor Sports	Canterbury City
2009–10	Hollands & Blair	Tudor Sports	Woodstock Park
2010–11	Sutton Athletic	Forest Hill Park	Saga Sports and Social
2011–12	Metrogas	AFC Mottingham	Sevenoaks
2012–13	Kennington	Halstead	Sevenoaks
2013–14	Coney Hall	FC Elmstead	East Kent College
2014–15	Stansfeld O&BC	Lewisham Athletic	Rolvenden
2015–16	East Kent College	Lewisham Athletic	Larkfield & New Hythe Wanderers
2016–17	Greenways	Welling Town	Rochester City
2017–18	Club Langley	Welling Town	Tonbridge Invicta
2018–19	Club Langley	Parkwood Rangers	Sturry
2019–20	(Cancelled owing to COVID-19 pandemic)		
2020–21	(Cancelled owing to COVID-19 pandemic)		
2021–22	Minster	Falconwood	Hildenborough
2022–23	Cuxton 91	Falconwood	Cuxton 91 Reserves
2023–24	Stansfeld O&BC	Agenda	Lokomotiv Canterbury
	Inter Regional Challenge Cup (Bill Manklow Cup)	Leckie Family Cup	
2024–25	Long Lane	Skippers FC	
2025–26	Metrogas	FC Greenwich	
