= Metrogas F.C. =

English football club

Coordinates: 51.419018°N 0.109959°E

Metrogas
- Full name: Metrogas Football Club
- Founded: 1888
- Ground: Bayliss Avenue, Thamesmead
- Capacity: 800
- Chairman: Kris Huckett
- Manager: Wayne Priestman
- League: Kent County League Premier
Home colours

Metrogas Football Club is a football club based in Thamesmead, England.

== History ==
Metrogas was founded in 1888, two years after the completion of the East Greenwich Gas Works, as a works team for the South Metropolitan Gas Company. Metrogas Athletic joined the Kent League in 1909, staying in the league for four years. In 1913, Metrogas joined the Athenian League, finishing runners up in 1920 and 1922. In the 1921–22 season, Metrogas entered the FA Cup for the first time, losing 2–1 at home to Norwich City in the fifth qualifying round. In 1923, Metrogas joined the London League, finishing 11th in the Premier Division.

In 1987, Metrogas joined the Spartan League, joining the Intermediate Division. Metrogas remained in the Spartan League until the 1993–94 season. In 2005, Metrogas joined the Kent County League. In 2014, Metrogas won the league, retaining the title the following season.

== Ground ==
Upon their foundation, Metrogas played at the Metrogas Sports and Social Club in Horn Lane, Greenwich and Metrogas later moved to Devonshire Grove, off the Old Kent Road. Metrogas' first team used to play at the Metrogas Sports Ground in New Eltham, before the club confirmed a groundsharing agreement to play at Sporting Club Thamesmead's Bayliss Avenue ground in May 2021.

== Records ==
- Best FA Cup performance: Fifth qualifying round, 1921–22
- Best FA Amateur Cup performance: Quarter final, 1921–22
