= Canterbury City F.C. =

Association football club in England

Canterbury City
- Full name: Canterbury City Football Club
- Nickname: City
- Founded: 1947
- Ground: Thanington Recreation Ground, Thanington
- Chairman: Trevor James
- Manager: Bradley Weight
- League: Kent County League Premier Division
- 2024–25: Southern Counties East League Division One, 6th of 18 (voluntarily demoted)
- Website: canterburycityfc.co.uk
Home colours	Away colours

Canterbury City Football Club is a football club based in Canterbury, Kent, England. They are currently members of the Kent County League Premier Division and currently play at the Thanington Recreation Ground in Thanington. Affiliated to the Kent County Football Association, the club reformed in 2007 and were the first football club to be formed as a community interest company.

== History ==
The original Canterbury City were formed in 1904, joining the East Kent Thursday League for the 1904–05 season. The following season saw them join both the East Kent League and the Faversham & District League, but they folded at the end of the 1906–07 season. In 1910 the club was reformed by P.C. Speed and joined Division Two West of the Kent League. However, they withdrew from the league during the season, dropping into the Thanet League before folding after playing their last match on 10 December. The name Canterbury City was resurrected in 1920 when Canterbury Alliance changed their name after being promoted to Division One of the Faversham & District League. However, they folded during the 1921–22 season after being unable to collect entrance fees from spectators as they played on a recreation ground.

A new Canterbury City was formed in 1947, and joined Division One of the Kent League. They remained in the league until it folded in 1959, at which point they joined the Metropolitan League. After one season in the Metropolitan League, Canterbury moved up to Division One of the Southern League. In 1964–65 the club reached the first round of the FA Cup for the first time, losing 6–0 at home to Fourth Division Torquay United. They reached the first round again in 1968–69, losing 1–0 at Third Division Swindon Town.

Canterbury remained in Division One until reorganisation saw them placed in Division One South in 1971. Further reorganisation saw them moved to the Southern Division in 1979. At the end of the 1993–94 season Canterbury dropped into Division One of the Kent League, which was renamed the Premier Division in 1998. They finished bottom of the league in 1999–2000 and 2000–01, after which they folded when the council evicted them from their Kingsmead Stadium.

The club was reformed in 2007 and joined Division Two East of the Kent County League. They won the division in their first season and were promoted to Division One East. After winning a second successive title the following season, they were promoted to the Premier Division. The 2010–11 season saw them finish as runners-up, earning promotion to the Kent League, which became the Southern Counties East League in 2013. When the league gained a second division in 2016, Canterbury became members of the Premier Division. After finishing second-from-bottom of the Premier Division in 2022–23 they were relegated to Division One.

On 29 March 2025, the club announced that having been unable to arrange a suitable ground to play at for the upcoming season, they had sought voluntary relegation to the Kent County League Premier Division.

== Grounds ==
The original Canterbury City played at Wincheap Grove. A 140-capacity stand and dressing rooms were built in 1904 and were opened on 4 December by the city's mayor. The 1910 version of the club played at Pay's Field (later known as Bretts Corner), whilst the 1920 version played at the Victoria Rec. By 1922, newspapers reported that the club were again playing at Wincheap Grove.

The modern version of the club originally played at the Kingsmead Stadium, but were evicted by the council in 2001. In the first seasons after reforming, they initially played in Bridge, before moving to the Recreation Ground in Hersden for the 2009–10 season. After the start of the 2010–11 season the club arranged an ongoing groundshare agreement to play their home matches at Herne Bay's Winch's Field ground. At the beginning of the 2014–15 season City moved to Ashford United's Homelands ground. They played at Deal Town's Charles Sports Ground in 2017–18, before moving to Salters Lane, the home ground of Faversham Town, for the 2018–19 season. After Faversham Town informed Canterbury that they would not wish to continue the arrangement into the 2022–23 season, a groundshare was arranged with Sittingbourne. In March 2023, they announced a new groundshare arrangement to play the following season at Margate's Hartsdown Park.

Following the announcement of being unable to arrange a suitable ground to play at for the 2025–26 season and voluntarily relegating to the Kent County League, the club moved to the Thanington Recreation Ground in Thanington.

== Honours ==
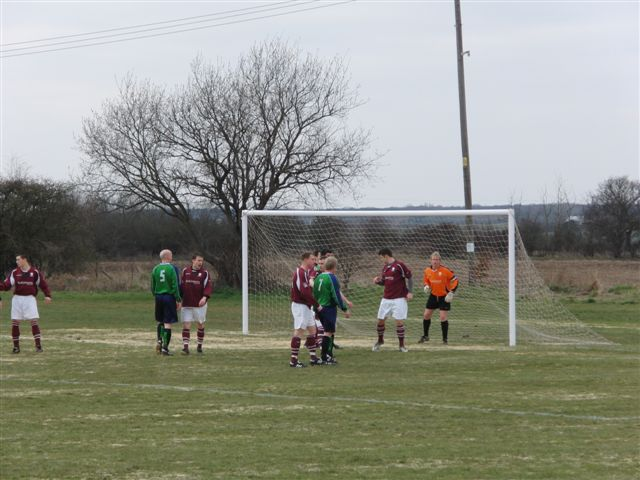
Canterbury City (claret shirts) in action against Snodland in 2010

- Kent League
  - League Cup winners 1949–50
- Kent County League
  - Division One East champions 2008–09
  - Division Two East champions 2007–08
  - Les Leckie Cup winners 2008–09
- Kent Senior Cup
  - Winners 1953–54
- Kent Senior Trophy
  - Winners 1979–80
- Frank Norris Trophy
  - Winners 1988–89, 1989–90
- Kent County Junior Cup
  - Winners 2007–08

== Records ==
- Best FA Cup performance: First round, 1964–65, 1968–69
- Best FA Trophy performance: Second round, 1974–75
- Best FA Vase performance: Semi-finals, 2018–19

== See also ==
- Canterbury City F.C. players
- Canterbury City F.C. managers
