= 2011–12 Isthmian League =

The 2011–12 season was the 97th season of the Isthmian League, which is an English football competition featuring semi-professional and amateur clubs from London, East and South East England. The league allocations were released on 20 May 2011.

== Premier Division ==
Isthmian League Premier Division
- Season: 2011–12
- Champions: Billericay Town
- Promoted: AFC Hornchurch; Billericay Town
- Relegated: Aveley; Horsham; Leatherhead; Tooting & Mitcham United
- Matches: 462
- Goals: 1,363 (2.95 per match)
- Top goalscorer: 32 goals - Richard Jolly (Wealdstone)
- Highest attendance: 1,145 - Billericay Town – Lowestoft Town, (28 April)
- Total attendance: 146,064
- Average attendance: 316 (-7.3% to previous season)

The Premier Division consisted of 22 clubs, including 17 clubs from the previous season, and five new clubs:

- East Thurrock United, promoted as champions of Division One North
- Leatherhead, promoted as play-off winners in Division One South
- Lewes, relegated from the Conference South
- Metropolitan Police, promoted as champions of Division One South
- Wingate & Finchley, promoted as play-off winners in Division One North

Billericay Town won the division and were promoted to the Conference South along with play-off winners AFC Hornchurch, while Lowestoft Town lost their second consecutive play-off final. Four clubs were relegated and there were no reprieves from relegation for the first time since the creation of North and South divisions in 2006.

=== League table ===
Pos	Team	Pld	W	D	L	GF	GA	GD	Pts	Promotion or relegation
1	Billericay Town	42	24	13	5	82	38	+44	85	Promoted to the Conference South
2	AFC Hornchurch	42	26	4	12	68	35	+33	82	Qualified for the play-offs, then promoted to the Conference South
3	Lowestoft Town	42	25	7	10	80	53	+27	82	Qualified for the play-offs
4	Wealdstone	42	20	15	7	76	39	+37	75	Qualified for the play-offs
5	Bury Town	42	22	9	11	85	55	+30	75	Qualified for the play-offs
6	Lewes	42	21	10	11	55	47	+8	73	
7	Hendon	42	21	9	12	69	44	+25	72	
8	Canvey Island	42	22	5	15	66	55	+11	71	
9	Cray Wanderers	42	20	8	14	74	55	+19	68	
10	East Thurrock United	42	18	8	16	70	65	+5	62	
11	Kingstonian	42	18	7	17	58	64	−6	61	
12	Metropolitan Police	42	18	6	18	63	46	+17	60	
13	Wingate & Finchley	42	16	11	15	63	79	−16	59	
14	Concord Rangers	42	16	9	17	72	66	+6	57	
15	Margate	42	15	9	18	66	65	+1	54	
16	Carshalton Athletic	42	14	10	18	48	55	−7	52	
17	Harrow Borough	42	13	8	21	53	70	−17	47	
18	Hastings United	42	13	8	21	43	61	−18	47	
19	Leatherhead	42	11	8	23	46	62	−16	41	Relegated to Division One South
20	Aveley	42	5	12	25	41	88	−47	27	Relegated to Division One North
21	Tooting & Mitcham United	42	7	6	29	47	116	−69	27	Relegated to Division One South
22	Horsham	42	3	6	33	38	105	−67	14 (Note: Horsham were deducted one point for fielding an ineligible player against Billericay Town on 10 March (2–2).)	Relegated to Division One South

Rules for classification: 1) points; 2) goal difference; 3) number of goals scored.

==== Top scorers ====
Player	Club	Goals
Richard Jolly	Wealdstone	32
Sam Higgins	East Thurrock United	31
Martin Tuohy	AFC Hornchurch	27
Tony Stokes	Concord Rangers	26
Leon Smith	Wingate & Finchley	23
Kwesi Appiah	Margate	22
Tommy Whitnell	Cray Wanderers	19
Paul Vines	Carshalton Athletic	18
Bobby Traynor	Kingstonian	16
Lewis Smith	AFC Hornchurch	16

=== Play-offs ===
==== Semi-finals ====
2 May 2012	AFC Hornchurch	3–1	Bury Town	Hornchurch Stadium, Hornchurch
19:45	Smith 49'; Tuohy 55'; Rook 72'		Clark 63'	Attendance: 646

2 May 2012	Lowestoft Town	2–1 (a.e.t.)	Wealdstone	Crown Meadow, Lowestoft
19:45	Henderson 21'; Sinclair 90+5' (pen.)		Fitzgerald 63'; O'Leary (red card); Cronin (red card)	Attendance: 1,158

==== Final ====
7 May 2012	AFC Hornchurch	2–1 (a.e.t.)	Lowestoft Town	Hornchurch Stadium
15:00	McKenzie 94'; Spencer 119'		Sinclair 104' (pen.)	Attendance: 1,411; Referee: L Venamore

=== Results grid ===
Home \ Away	AFC	AVE	BIL	BUR	CAN	CAR	CON	CRA	ETU	HAR	HAS	HEN	HOR	KIN	LEA	LEW	LOW	MAR	MET	T&M	WEA	W&F
AFC Hornchurch		2–1	0–0	0–1	1–2	1–1	2–0	1–2	1–0	0–0	0–1	0–1	0–2	3–0	2–1	1–0	3–0	3–0	1–0	6–0	1–1	1–0
Aveley	2–3		0–6	1–2	2–4	1–1	3–3	1–1	0–3	3–2	0–1	1–7	2–1	0–0	1–1	0–0	0–1	1–3	0–2	1–3	0–3	1–2
Billericay Town	0–1	2–1		4–4	4–2	1–1	0–0	3–1	1–0	3–0	2–0	2–1	2–2	6–0	2–1	1–0	1–4	1–1	2–1	5–1	0–0	2–0
Bury Town	2–1	1–0	1–1		2–0	2–0	2–0	1–1	5–2	2–2	5–0	0–1	3–0	1–1	2–1	2–1	2–3	2–1	0–1	4–2	1–1	2–2
Canvey Island	4–1	0–3	0–2	0–1		1–2	0–2	1–2	1–0	1–0	1–2	3–1	1–0	0–2	3–1	1–2	3–0	5–0	2–2	2–0	3–1	2–3
Carshalton Athletic	1–2	0–0	0–1	2–1	0–1		0–2	2–3	0–1	0–1	2–0	0–3	2–1	0–1	1–1	1–2	1–4	2–1	2–1	3–0	0–0	3–0
Concord Rangers	1–2	3–0	0–0	4–2	1–2	0–0		1–1	4–5	1–0	2–2	2–0	5–0	2–3	2–1	2–3	3–2	1–1	0–3	3–4	1–2	1–1
Cray Wanderers	2–5	2–2	2–3	2–0	0–0	1–0	2–4		3–0	1–2	1–0	0–0	3–1	0–0	1–2	0–1	0–2	2–4	2–1	4–1	2–1	3–2
East Thurrock United	0–1	4–1	1–2	2–1	2–1	1–1	4–1	1–2		0–3	0–2	0–0	1–0	0–1	3–0	1–0	1–3	3–0	4–2	1–0	3–3	1–2
Harrow Borough	1–0	1–1	1–1	2–1	3–4	1–2	0–3	0–4	3–1		1–1	4–2	2–0	1–3	2–0	0–1	2–4	0–2	2–1	1–1	0–0	1–3
Hastings United	1–3	2–1	0–0	0–1	1–1	0–2	1–1	0–2	1–2	3–1		0–2	5–0	1–0	0–0	0–1	2–0	2–2	0–2	2–0	0–2	0–1
Hendon	2–0	1–1	1–2	3–4	1–0	1–1	1–0	1–0	1–1	3–2	2–1		1–1	2–1	1–2	2–2	1–0	0–3	1–3	5–0	1–1	1–1
Horsham	0–3	1–3	0–5	1–3	1–2	1–3	0–3	1–5	1–5	1–3	1–2	0–3		1–3	1–4	0–1	1–2	1–2	2–2	2–0	1–1	1–2
Kingstonian	0–2	2–0	0–2	1–1	1–2	2–3	0–1	4–2	2–5	1–0	1–1	1–0	3–4		0–3	1–0	2–0	2–1	2–1	2–1	0–3	2–2
Leatherhead	0–1	2–0	0–2	0–5	0–1	0–1	1–3	1–4	2–1	2–0	2–0	0–1	2–1	0–2		0–1	1–2	2–0	1–1	2–4	1–1	2–2
Lewes	0–4	4–1	2–1	1–1	1–2	1–0	1–2	1–0	2–2	4–2	2–1	3–2	1–1	1–1	1–0		2–2	2–0	1–0	3–1	1–0	0–0
Lowestoft Town	2–1	1–0	1–0	2–1	1–1	3–2	5–0	2–1	1–1	1–2	1–3	2–0	1–0	3–2	2–2	3–1		2–1	2–2	2–2	2–1	2–0
Margate	0–2	3–0	2–2	2–3	1–1	0–1	1–0	1–3	5–0	1–0	4–1	0–2	2–1	2–1	0–0	5–1	1–4		1–3	1–2	0–2	5–0
Metropolitan Police	0–2	0–0	0–1	0–1	3–1	5–0	3–0	1–0	1–2	1–0	4–0	0–1	4–1	2–1	2–1	0–0	0–2	1–3		3–0	1–2	2–0
Tooting & Mitcham United	1–2	1–2	4–2	1–7	0–1	4–3	0–6	0–4	0–1	1–3	1–2	0–3	2–2	1–4	1–4	2–2	2–1	1–1	0–1		0–6	1–1
Wealdstone	2–1	5–2	1–1	3–1	1–2	1–1	3–1	1–1	2–2	4–0	2–1	0–2	3–0	4–1	1–0	1–0	0–0	1–1	1–0	2–0		2–4
Wingate & Finchley	1–2	2–2	1–4	3–2	0–2	2–1	3–1	0–2	3–3	2–2	3–1	0–5	3–2	0–2	1–0	1–2	2–1	2–2	2–1	4–2	0–5	

Updated to match(es) played on 30 April 2012. Source: Ryman League Premier Division
Legend: Blue = home team win; Yellow = draw; Red = away team win.

=== Stadia and locations ===
Locations of the Premier Division teams
Greater London Premier Division football clubs

Club	Stadium	Capacity
AFC Hornchurch	Hornchurch Stadium	3,500
Aveley	The Mill Field	1,100
Billericay Town	New Lodge	3,500
Bury Town	Ram Meadow	3,500
Canvey Island	Brockwell Stadium	4,308
Carshalton Athletic	War Memorial Sports Ground	5,000
Concord Rangers	Thames Road	1,500
Cray Wanderers	Hayes Lane (groundshare with Bromley)	6,000
East Thurrock United	Rookery Hill	4,000
Harrow Borough	Earlsmead Stadium	3,070
Hastings United	The Pilot Field	4,050
Hendon	Vale Farm (groundshare with Wembley)	3,000
Horsham	Gorings Mead (groundshare with Horsham YMCA)	1,500
Kingstonian	Kingsmeadow (groundshare with AFC Wimbledon)	5,194
Leatherhead	Fetcham Grove	3,400
Lewes	The Dripping Pan	3,000
Lowestoft Town	Crown Meadow	2,250
Margate	Hartsdown Park	2,100
Metropolitan Police	Imber Court	3,000
Tooting & Mitcham United	Imperial Fields	3,500
Wealdstone	Grosvenor Vale	2,640
Wingate & Finchley	The Harry Abrahams Stadium	1,500

== Division One North ==
Isthmian League Division One North
- Season: 2011–12
- Champions: Leiston
- Promoted: Enfield Town; Leiston
- Relegated: Great Wakering Rovers
- Matches: 462
- Goals: 1,473 (3.19 per match)
- Top goalscorer: 26 goals – Liam Hope (Enfield Town)
- Highest attendance: 602 – Enfield Town – Leiston, (21 April)
- Total attendance: 64,052
- Average attendance: 139 (+3.7% to previous season)

Division One North consisted of 22 clubs, including 19 clubs from the previous season, and three new clubs:

- Chatham Town, transferred from Division One South
- Leiston, promoted as champions of the Eastern Counties League
- Soham Town Rangers, transferred from Southern Football League Division One Central

Leiston won the division and were promoted for the second time in a row along with play-off winners Enfield Town. Great Wakering Rovers finished bottom of the table and were the only relegated club, while Ware were reprieved due to clubs folding higher up in the pyramid.

=== League table ===
Pos	Team	Pld	W	D	L	GF	GA	GD	Pts	Promotion or relegation
1	Leiston	42	28	7	7	99	41	+58	91	Promoted to the Premier Division
2	Enfield Town	42	27	9	6	96	46	+50	90	Qualified for the play-offs, then promoted to the Premier Division
3	Tilbury	42	23	11	8	82	62	+20	80	Qualified for the play-offs
4	Needham Market	42	23	8	11	104	56	+48	77	Qualified for the play-offs
5	Grays Athletic	42	24	8	10	80	47	+33	77 (Note: Grays Athletic were deducted three points for fielding an ineligible player against Leiston on 26 October (1–0).)	Qualified for the play-offs
6	Redbridge	42	21	10	11	80	59	+21	73	
7	Harlow Town	42	21	8	13	70	49	+21	71	
8	AFC Sudbury	42	20	9	13	65	57	+8	69	
9	Brentwood Town	42	18	8	16	58	42	+16	62	
10	Thamesmead Town	42	17	7	18	68	71	−3	58	
11	Maldon & Tiptree	42	16	10	16	62	66	−4	58	
12	Potters Bar Town	42	16	9	17	67	76	−9	57	
13	Romford	42	15	12	15	64	73	−9	57	
14	Waltham Abbey	42	15	10	17	79	76	+3	55	
15	Chatham Town	42	16	6	20	54	63	−9	54	
16	Heybridge Swifts	42	15	7	20	59	64	−5	52	
17	Waltham Forest	42	12	7	23	59	95	−36	43	
18	Cheshunt	42	9	12	21	42	83	−41	39	
19	Soham Town Rangers	42	7	13	22	55	93	−38	34	
20	Ilford	42	8	6	28	47	85	−38	30	
21	Ware	42	8	6	28	40	78	−38	30	Reprieved from relegation
22	Great Wakering Rovers	42	6	11	25	43	91	−48	29	Relegated to the Essex Senior League

Rules for classification: 1) points; 2) goal difference; 3) number of goals scored.

==== Top scorers ====
Player	Club	Goals
Liam Hope	Enfield Town	26
Alex Read	Tilbury	24
James Baker	AFC Sudbury	24
Sam Newson	Needham Market	22
James Gershfield	Potters Bar Town	21

=== Play-offs ===
==== Semi-finals ====
3 May 2012	Enfield Town	2–2 (3–1 p)	Grays Athletic	Queen Elizabeth II Stadium, Enfield Town
19:45	Wallace 1'; Kirby 49'; Barber (yellow card) 120' (yellow-red card)		Agombar 79' (pen.); Baker 88'	Attendance: 627

4 May 2012	Tilbury	3–4 (a.e.t.)	Needham Market	Chadfields, Tilbury
19:45	Henty 6'; Worrell 90+13'; West 95'		Newson 41' (pen.), 103', 120'; Wright 72'	Attendance: 243

==== Final ====
6 May 2012	Enfield Town	1–0	Needham Market	Queen Elizabeth II Stadium, Enfield Town
15:00	Matata 18'			Attendance: 817

=== Results grid ===
Home \ Away	SUD	BRE	CHA	CHE	ENF	GRY	GWR	HAR	HEY	ILF	LEI	M&T	NDH	POT	RED	ROM	SOH	THA	TIL	WAL	WFO	WAR
AFC Sudbury		1–0	1–0	0–0	1–2	1–2	2–2	1–2	1–4	1–0	2–3	3–2	1–0	1–0	1–1	2–2	4–1	0–2	2–2	1–0	1–2	3–1
Brentwood Town	1–2		3–0	1–2	1–2	1–2	5–0	0–1	2–0	1–3	0–1	1–1	1–1	1–0	0–1	4–2	2–1	1–1	1–2	2–0	5–1	1–0
Chatham Town	0–3	0–1		4–0	2–3	0–2	1–0	2–1	3–2	2–0	0–2	1–1	0–2	2–2	1–1	0–3	4–2	1–2	3–0	2–1	3–1	5–2
Cheshunt	1–4	0–5	1–0		0–5	0–1	2–0	2–0	1–4	2–2	0–2	0–0	1–8	2–1	1–2	3–1	0–0	1–1	1–5	0–1	2–1	0–0
Enfield Town	3–3	1–0	3–0	1–1		2–1	2–1	0–3	3–1	5–0	1–0	4–0	2–2	4–2	3–0	1–0	3–0	5–0	3–4	1–1	4–3	2–1
Grays Athletic	4–0	2–0	1–1	0–0	0–3		3–2	1–1	2–0	3–2	1–0	0–1	4–2	3–1	0–2	1–2	4–1	1–2	1–3	2–0	0–0	4–0
Great Wakering Rovers	1–3	0–2	2–3	2–2	1–1	0–1		1–1	0–0	0–0	0–4	1–1	0–1	0–3	2–3	2–0	1–1	2–1	1–2	0–2	2–2	4–2
Harlow Town	0–1	1–0	3–0	5–3	1–1	1–1	3–1		1–1	2–0	0–3	1–2	0–0	1–1	2–1	1–0	3–1	3–2	3–0	1–1	2–3	4–0
Heybridge Swifts	1–2	4–0	0–1	1–3	0–1	1–1	3–1	1–3		3–2	2–1	1–0	1–1	0–3	0–3	0–1	2–2	0–1	0–2	2–3	1–0	1–0
Ilford	0–0	0–1	0–1	3–2	1–1	0–5	1–2	1–2	2–1		2–3	0–2	1–2	1–0	1–2	2–3	2–2	1–0	2–2	3–2	0–1	1–2
Leiston	1–1	2–1	4–0	2–0	2–1	2–2	2–0	1–4	3–1	3–0		4–1	3–0	6–0	1–1	3–2	2–0	2–2	3–0	2–1	6–0	1–1
Maldon & Tiptree	2–3	1–2	0–1	2–1	2–0	1–3	3–2	0–1	2–2	2–3	3–1		1–2	0–3	3–1	0–0	2–1	1–0	0–0	2–5	3–0	2–0
Needham Market	2–1	1–2	0–1	7–0	0–1	2–1	7–0	3–1	3–4	4–2	0–5	4–1		7–0	2–0	3–3	2–3	4–0	4–1	3–1	1–0	4–0
Potters Bar Town	5–1	1–1	2–1	1–1	0–0	1–3	1–1	2–0	2–1	3–1	1–3	4–3	2–3		1–5	1–0	3–3	0–3	3–2	2–3	0–0	2–1
Redbridge	2–2	2–2	0–4	1–0	3–5	2–3	2–1	2–1	3–1	1–2	2–2	1–1	3–2	0–2		3–0	3–2	1–1	3–0	1–1	4–1	2–1
Romford	1–0	0–0	2–1	2–2	0–5	2–2	1–0	2–1	2–0	2–0	1–2	3–4	1–1	0–4	1–0		3–3	0–1	1–1	2–2	2–0	3–2
Soham Town Rangers	3–1	0–3	1–0	1–1	0–4	3–2	3–3	1–3	1–1	2–0	2–1	0–1	2–2	1–1	1–0	1–2		1–3	0–1	1–3	2–3	1–4
Thamesmead Town	2–1	0–1	2–0	1–2	2–0	1–5	4–0	1–3	0–4	1–0	0–1	1–2	2–4	5–0	1–4	2–2	4–0		3–4	4–4	4–3	1–2
Tilbury	0–1	2–0	1–1	2–1	2–1	2–1	3–1	2–1	1–3	4–1	3–1	1–1	1–1	1–0	1–1	4–1	4–2	0–0		3–2	3–3	2–1
Waltham Abbey	0–3	1–1	1–0	1–0	2–2	0–1	7–0	1–3	1–2	2–1	3–3	1–1	0–4	3–0	1–3	4–5	5–2	2–3	2–2		0–1	3–2
Waltham Forest	0–1	0–2	3–1	2–1	1–2	1–2	1–2	2–0	0–2	4–3	0–5	3–2	3–1	1–4	2–7	4–4	0–0	2–0	2–5	2–3		1–1
Ware	0–2	0–0	2–2	1–0	2–3	1–2	0–2	1–0	0–1	2–1	0–1	1–3	0–2	1–3	0–1	1–0	1–1	1–2	0–2	1–3	2–0	

Updated to match(es) played on 30 April 2012. Source: Ryman League Division One North
Legend: Blue = home team win; Yellow = draw; Red = away team win.

=== Stadia and locations ===
Locations of Division One North clubs
Greater London Division One North clubs

Club	Stadium	Capacity
AFC Sudbury	King's Marsh	3,800
Brentwood Town	The Brentwood Centre Arena	1,800
Chatham Town	The Sports Ground	5,000
Cheshunt	Cheshunt Stadium	3,000
Enfield Town	Queen Elizabeth II Stadium	2,500
Grays Athletic	Rookery Hill (groundshare with East Thurrock United)	4,000
Great Wakering Rovers	Burroughs Park	3,500
Harlow Town	Barrows Farm	3,500
Heybridge Swifts	Scraley Road	3,000
Ilford	Cricklefield Stadium	3,500
Leiston	Victory Road	2,500
Maldon & Tiptree	Wallace Binder Ground	2,000
Needham Market	Bloomfields	4,000
Potters Bar Town	Parkfield	2,000
Redbridge	Oakside	3,000
Romford	Mill Field	1,100
Soham Town Rangers	Julius Martin Lane	2,000
Thamesmead Town	Bayliss Avenue	6,000
Tilbury	Chadfields	4,000
Waltham Abbey	Capershotts	3,500
Waltham Forest	Cricklefield Stadium (groundshare with Ilford)	3,500
Ware	Wodson Park	3,300

==== Notes ====
1. Enfield spent start of the season groundsharing with Cheshunt before moving to Queen Elizabeth II Stadium at November.

== Division One South ==
Isthmian League Division One South
- Season: 2011–12
- Champions: Whitehawk
- Promoted: Bognor Regis Town; Whitehawk
- Relegated: Whyteleafe
- Matches: 420
- Goals: 1,270 (3.02 per match)
- Top goalscorer: 24 goals – Jason Prior (Bognor Regis Town) and Stuart King (Folkestone Invicta)
- Highest attendance: 1,279 – Bognor Regis Town – Worthing, (26 December)
- Total attendance: 84,520
- Average attendance: 201 (+24.1% to previous season)

Division One South consisted of 22 clubs, including 17 clubs from the previous season, and five new clubs:

- Crawley Down, promoted as champions of the Sussex County League
- Croydon Athletic, relegated from the Premier Division
- Folkestone Invicta, relegated from the Premier Division
- Hythe Town, promoted as champions of the Kent League
- Maidstone United, relegated from the Premier Division

Croydon Athletic were deducted ten points for financial irregularities, and resigned from the league on 18 January 2012. Croydon's record of P19 W3 D3 L13 GF23 GA44 Pts2 was subsequently expunged.

Whitehawk won Division One South and were promoted to the Premier Division for the first time in their history. Bognor Regis Town finished second for the second season in a row. After defeating Godalming Town in the semi-final, Bognor Regis Town gained revenge on their semifinal rivals from the previous year, Dulwich Hamlet, 1–0 and joined Whitehawk in the Premier Division. Dulwich Hamlet lost their second consecutive play-off final. Croydon Athletic resigned from the league in the middle of the season, so there was only one relegation place, taken by Whyteleafe.

=== League table ===
Pos	Team	Pld	W	D	L	GF	GA	GD	Pts	Promotion or relegation
1	Whitehawk	40	29	6	5	82	26	+56	90 (Note: Whitehawk were deducted three points for fielding an ineligible player against Maidstone United on 20 August (3–0).)	Promoted to the Premier Division
2	Bognor Regis Town	40	26	10	4	105	38	+67	88	Qualified for the play-offs, then promoted to the Premier Division
3	Dulwich Hamlet	40	26	8	6	73	26	+47	86	Qualified for the play-offs
4	Folkestone Invicta	40	23	7	10	82	53	+29	76	Qualified for the play-offs
5	Godalming Town	40	22	7	11	77	53	+24	73	Qualified for the play-offs, then transferred to SFL Division One Central
6	Maidstone United	40	20	7	13	68	50	+18	67	
7	Worthing	40	18	10	12	69	45	+24	64	
8	Hythe Town	40	17	8	15	63	69	−6	59	
9	Merstham	40	17	8	15	61	62	−1	59	
10	Chipstead	40	16	8	16	59	57	+2	56	
11	Ramsgate	40	16	7	17	61	73	−12	55	
12	Walton & Hersham	40	14	8	18	54	52	+2	50	
13	Corinthian-Casuals	40	12	12	16	49	63	−14	48	
14	Eastbourne Town	40	11	13	16	49	62	−13	46	
15	Walton Casuals	40	12	6	22	51	74	−23	42	
16	Crawley Down	40	12	5	23	65	81	−16	41	
17	Faversham Town	40	10	10	20	43	67	−24	40	
18	Whitstable Town	40	12	4	24	46	87	−41	40	
19	Sittingbourne	40	6	12	22	36	75	−39	30	
20	Burgess Hill Town	40	9	6	25	39	90	−51	30 (Note: Burgess Hill Town were deducted three points for fielding an ineligible player against Walton & Hersham on 31 December (1–0).)	
21	Whyteleafe	40	6	10	24	38	67	−29	28	Relegated to the Kent League
22	Croydon Athletic	0	0	0	0	0	0	0	0	Resigned, record expunged

Rules for classification: 1) points; 2) goal difference; 3) number of goals scored.

==== Top scorers ====
Player	Club	Goals
Jason Prior	Bognor Regis Town	24
Stuart King	Folkestone Invicta	24
Shaun Welford	Maidstone United	23
Ryan McBride	Worthing	19
Terry Dodd	Bognor Regis Town	19

=== Play-offs ===
==== Semi-finals ====
1 May 2012	Bognor Regis Town	4–4 (5–3 p)	Godalming Town	Nyewood Lane, Bognor Regis
19:45	Robinson 33' 76' 102' (pen.); Dodd 75'		Harris 63' 97'; Cooper 73'; Foulser 90+1'	Attendance: 866

1 May 2012	Dulwich Hamlet	2–1	Folkestone Invicta	Champion Hill, East Dulwich
19:45	Powell 28' 82'		King 85'	Attendance: 632

==== Final ====
6 May 2012	Bognor Regis Town	1–0	Dulwich Hamlet	Nyewood Lane, Bognor Regis
15:00	Axten 17'			Attendance: 2,011

=== Results grid ===
Home \ Away	BOG	BUR	CHI	COR	CRA	CRO	DUL	EST	FAV	FOL	GOD	HYT	MDS	MER	RAM	SIT	W&H	WAL	WHI	WHT	WHY	WOR
Bognor Regis Town		5–0	2–1	2–1	5–1		2–2	4–0	2–0	1–1	6–0	3–0	2–0	2–0	2–2	4–2	1–1	6–1	1–0	2–2	4–1	1–0
Burgess Hill Town	0–4		1–3	0–1	0–5		1–0	3–3	1–2	2–2	0–4	0–2	2–3	3–2	1–2	3–0	1–0	1–1	0–2	2–1	0–4	2–2
Chipstead	1–3	5–1		1–1	1–0		1–3	2–3	1–1	1–4	1–2	1–1	0–1	1–0	1–2	2–0	2–0	1–0	1–1	4–1	1–0	1–0
Corinthian-Casuals	3–1	5–2	1–1		2–3		1–1	1–1	1–1	3–1	0–3	1–1	0–1	0–1	3–2	0–2	0–2	2–1	0–3	2–3	2–2	3–3
Crawley Down	3–3	5–0	1–3	0–0			0–4	1–2	3–1	0–1	0–4	2–3	1–5	4–1	1–2	5–1	3–5	6–1	0–3	3–0	1–1	2–0
Croydon Athletic																						
Dulwich Hamlet	0–0	2–0	3–0	3–0	1–1			2–0	3–1	5–2	0–1	1–0	0–0	3–1	1–0	2–0	0–0	3–1	0–2	4–1	2–0	3–1
Eastbourne Town	1–0	0–1	3–1	0–1	3–1		1–3		3–0	0–0	0–3	1–2	1–3	1–1	1–1	0–1	1–3	0–0	2–3	1–0	1–0	2–2
Faversham Town	0–2	1–1	1–2	1–3	2–0		0–3	1–1		1–4	0–1	1–3	2–1	2–2	3–2	4–0	1–2	1–0	1–2	0–2	0–0	0–1
Folkestone Invicta	2–2	1–0	2–0	4–2	4–1		1–3	1–1	0–0		2–2	8–0	3–2	0–4	2–3	4–1	2–1	1–0	2–0	4–1	0–1	3–1
Godalming Town	2–4	7–0	1–0	4–0	5–2		2–2	4–2	0–1	2–1		3–0	1–1	0–4	2–0	0–0	1–2	0–2	2–1	4–1	0–2	1–0
Hythe Town	2–3	2–3	1–1	1–1	3–1		1–0	3–2	3–0	0–2	1–2		1–0	3–1	3–2	1–1	2–3	2–2	0–1	4–0	4–0	3–1
Maidstone United	2–4	1–0	3–0	2–1	2–0		2–0	1–1	1–3	0–3	4–2	2–0		1–1	4–1	1–0	2–0	0–1	0–3	4–0	2–0	0–0
Merstham	0–4	2–1	1–1	2–1	4–2		0–3	3–0	2–1	0–4	1–0	1–1	2–4		4–2	1–1	1–0	1–0	2–3	3–2	1–1	2–1
Ramsgate	1–4	3–2	1–4	0–1	1–0		0–1	0–0	3–2	3–2	2–2	2–0	1–0	4–2		3–2	0–0	1–3	0–3	0–2	2–1	4–3
Sittingbourne	0–0	0–0	2–2	0–2	2–1		0–1	1–2	2–2	1–0	1–3	1–2	0–3	1–2	1–1		0–0	1–1	2–0	0–1	0–0	0–2
Walton & Hersham	0–0	1–0	1–4	0–1	4–1		0–3	1–1	2–3	5–0	1–2	0–3	1–4	1–1	1–2	4–0		4–1	0–1	5–0	2–1	0–1
Walton Casuals	0–5	0–2	1–3	0–1	1–3		0–2	4–2	0–0	2–4	1–1	1–0	3–2	2–0	3–1	5–1	2–0		0–2	2–3	3–2	0–1
Whitehawk	3–0	2–0	4–0	3–0	1–0		1–1	1–0	4–0	0–1	1–1	1–0	2–2	2–1	2–1	4–3	2–1	2–0		3–0	3–0	1–1
Whitstable Town	2–5	0–1	3–2	2–2	0–0		1–2	1–2	0–2	0–1	2–1	2–4	2–0	0–2	0–0	1–2	1–0	2–0	0–5		2–1	2–3
Whyteleafe	0–4	2–0	0–2	3–0	0–1		0–2	2–3	1–1	1–2	1–2	0–0	1–1	2–3	2–3	2–2	0–1	0–3	0–3	2–0		0–2
Worthing	1–0	2–1	2–0	0–0	0–1		1–0	1–1	3–0	0–1	4–0	5–0	5–1	5–1	2–0	4–1	0–0	5–3	1–1	1–2	2–2	

Updated to match(es) played on 30 April 2012. Source: Ryman League Division One South
Legend: Blue = home team win; Yellow = draw; Red = away team win.

=== Stadia and locations ===
Locations of Division One South clubs
Greater London Division One South clubs

Club	Stadium	Capacity
Bognor Regis Town	Nyewood Lane	4,000
Burgess Hill Town	Leylands Park	2,000
Chipstead	High Road	2,000
Corinthian-Casuals	King George's Field	2,700
Crawley Down Gatwick	The Haven Sportsfield	1,000
Croydon Athletic	Keith Tuckey Stadium	3,000
Dulwich Hamlet	Champion Hill	3,000
Eastbourne Town	The Saffrons	3,000
Faversham Town	Shepherd Neame Stadium	2,000
Folkestone Invicta	Cheriton Road	4,000
Godalming Town	Weycourt	3,000
Hythe Town	Reachfields Stadium	3,000
Maidstone United	Bourne Park (groundshare with Sittingbourne)	3,000
Merstham	Moatside	2,000
Ramsgate	Southwood Stadium	2,500
Sittingbourne	Bourne Park	3,000
Walton & Hersham	The Sports Ground	2,000
Walton Casuals	Waterside Stadium	2,000
Whitehawk	The Enclosed Ground	2,000
Whitstable Town	The Belmont Ground	3,000
Whyteleafe	Church Road	2,000
Worthing	Worthing Stadium	4,000

== League Cup ==
2011–12 Isthmian League Cup
Tournament details
- Country: England
- Teams: 66

Final positions
- Champions: Bury Town
- Runners-up: East Thurrock United

Tournament statistics
- Matches played: 65
- Goals scored: 202 (3.11 per match)

The Isthmian League Cup 2011–12 (billed as the Championship Manager Cup 2011–12 for sponsorship reasons) is the 38th season of the Isthmian League Cup, the cup competition of the whole Isthmian League.

=== Calendar ===
Round	Dates	Matches	Clubs
First round	8 October to 18 October	2	66 → 64
Second round	18 October to 15 November	32	64 → 32
Third round	5 November to 6 December	16	32 → 16
Fourth round	6 December to 13 December	8	16 → 8
Quarterfinals	17 January to 15 February	4	8 → 4
Semifinals	21 February	2	4 → 2
Final	28 March	1	2 → 1

=== First round ===
Four clubs from Division Ones participated in the first round, while all other clubs received a bye to the second round.

Tie	Home team (tier)	Score	Away team (tier)	Att.
1	Dulwich Hamlet (S)	2–2	Godalming Town (S)	178
Dulwich Hamlet advance 4–2 on penalties
2	Great Wakering Rovers (N)	2–2	Maldon & Tiptree (N)	55
Maldon & Tiptree advance 4–2 on penalties

=== Second round ===
The two clubs to have made it through the first round were entered into the draw with every other Isthmian League club, making sixty-four teams.

Tie	Home team (tier)	Score	Away team (tier)	Att.
3	Billericay Town (P)	2–1	Grays Athletic (N)	170
4	Bury Town (P)	1–0	Harlow Town (N)	228
5	Canvey Island (P)	1–1	Aveley (P)	160
Canvey Island advance 4–2 on penalties
6	Chatham Town (N)	4–1	Ilford (N)	67
7	Cheshunt (N)	3–1	AFC Hornchurch (P)	81
8	Concord Rangers (P)	3–3	Needham Market (N)	98
Needham Market advance 3–1 on penalties
9	Corinthian-Casuals (S)	1–1	Hythe Town (S)	162
Corinthian-Casuals advance 5–4 on penalties
10	Crawley Down (S)	0–4	Lewes (P)	94
11	Cray Wanderers (P)	0–4	Ramsgate (S)	76
12	Dulwich Hamlet (S)	4–1	Burgess Hill Town (S)	84
13	East Thurrock United (P)	2–3	Redbridge (N)	71
Tie awarded to East Thurrock United
14	Enfield Town (N)	3–0	Waltham Forest (N)	72
15	Faversham Town (S)	0–3	Eastbourne Town (S)	70
16	Folkestone Invicta (S)	5–0	Horsham (P)	117
17	Harrow Borough (P)	2–1	Hendon (P)	74
18	Heybridge Swifts (N)	0–1	AFC Sudbury (N)	103

Tie	Home team (tier)	Score	Away team (tier)	Att.
19	Leatherhead (P)	2–2	Wealdstone (P)	126
Leatherhead advance 4–3 on penalties
20	Leiston (N)	3–0	Waltham Abbey (N)	82
21	Lowestoft Town (P)	2–2	Tilbury (N)	306
Lowestoft Town advance 3–1 on penalties
22	Maidstone United (S)	6–0	Merstham (S)	107
23	Maldon & Tiptree (N)	4–1	Romford (N)	57
24	Margate (P)	3–1	Kingstonian (P)	103
25	Sittingbourne (S)	0–2	Hastings United (P)	86
26	Soham Town Rangers (N)	0–3	Brentwood Town (N)	92
27	Thamesmead Town (N)	1–0	Wingate & Finchley (P)	27
28	Tooting & Mitcham United (P)	3–1	Croydon Athletic (S)	120
29	Walton Casuals (S)	0–5	Bognor Regis Town (S)	55
30	Ware (N)	1–0	Potters Bar Town (N)	62
31	Whitehawk (S)	0–2	Metropolitan Police (P)	85
32	Whitstable Town (S)	0–0	Chipstead (S)	98
Chipstead advance 5–3 on penalties
33	Whyteleafe (S)	0–2	Walton & Hersham (S)	60
34	Worthing (S)	1–3	Carshalton Athletic (P)	120

=== Third round ===
Tie	Home team (tier)	Score	Away team (tier)	Att.
35	Bury Town (P)	3–2	Chatham Town (N)	187
36	Canvey Island (P)	5–1	Ware (N)	108
37	Corinthian-Casuals (S)	2–0	Eastbourne Town (S)	41
38	Dulwich Hamlet (S)	2–1	Walton & Hersham (S)	91
39	East Thurrock United (P)	2–0	Thamesmead Town (N)	61
40	Enfield Town (N)	0–2	AFC Sudbury (N)	152
41	Harrow Borough (P)	1–2	Cheshunt (N)	43
42	Hastings United (P)	2–1	Tooting & Mitcham United (P)	243
43	Leatherhead (P)	2–0	Bognor Regis Town (S)	144

Tie	Home team (tier)	Score	Away team (tier)	Att.
44	Leiston (N)	1–0	Billericay Town (P)	179
45	Lewes (P)	3–1	Folkestone Invicta (S)	227
46	Maidstone United (S)	2–2	Carshalton Athletic (P)	167
Maidstone United advance 4–2 on penalties
47	Maldon & Tiptree (N)	0–1	Lowestoft Town (P)	40
48	Metropolitan Police (P)	3–2	Margate (P)	58
49	Needham Market (N)	3–0	Brentwood Town (N)	187
50	Ramsgate (S)	2–1	Chipstead (S)	97

=== Fourth round ===
Tie	Home team (tier)	Score	Away team (tier)	Att.
51	Bury Town (P)	2–1	Corinthian-Casuals (S)	167
52	Canvey Island (P)	2–0	Cheshunt (N)	105
53	East Thurrock United (P)	5–1	Ramsgate (S)	61
54	Harrow Borough (P)	0–1	Hastings United (P)	144
55	Lowestoft Town (P)	1–0	Dulwich Hamlet (S)	251

Tie	Home team (tier)	Score	Away team (tier)	Att.
56	Maidstone United (S)	3–0	Leatherhead (P)	117
57	Metropolitan Police (P)	1–2	Lewes (P)	121
58	Needham Market (N)	2–2	AFC Sudbury (N)	221
AFC Sudbury advance 4–3 on penalties

=== Quarterfinals ===
Tie	Home team (tier)	Score	Away team (tier)	Att.
59	East Thurrock United (P)	3–0	Maidstone United (S)	109
60	Hastings United (P)	0–2	Bury Town (P)	238

Tie	Home team (tier)	Score	Away team (tier)	Att.
61	Lewes (P)	1–1	AFC Sudbury (N)	266
Lewes advance 5–4 on penalties
62	Lowestoft Town (P)	3–2	Canvey Island (P)	388

=== Semifinals ===
Tie	Home team (tier)	Score	Away team (tier)	Att.
63	Bury Town (P)	2–0	Lowestoft Town (P)	574
64	East Thurrock United (P)	1–0	Lewes (P)	110

=== Final ===
28 March 2012 65	Bury Town (P)	1–0	East Thurrock United (P)	Wheatsheaf Park, Staines-upon-Thames
19:30				Attendance: 313

== See also ==
- Isthmian League
- 2011–12 Northern Premier League
- 2011–12 Southern Football League
