= 2012–13 Isthmian League =

The 2012–13 season was the 98th season of the Isthmian League, which is an English football competition featuring semi-professional and amateur clubs from London, East and South East England.

The constitution of the three divisions was announced on 25 May 2012. For this season, only two clubs were relegated from the Premier Division, and one from each Division One. This was to allow for expansion to 72 clubs for the 2013–14 season.

== Premier Division ==
Isthmian League Premier Division
- Season: 2012–13
- Champions: Whitehawk
- Promoted: Concord Rangers; Whitehawk
- Relegated: Hastings United; Thurrock
- Matches: 462
- Goals: 1,320 (2.86 per match)
- Top goalscorer: 27 goals - John Sands (Bury Town)
- Highest attendance: 890 – Lowestoft Town – Hendon, (27 April)
- Total attendance: 137,106
- Average attendance: 297 (-6.0% to previous season)

The Premier Division consisted of 22 clubs, including 16 clubs from the previous season, and six new clubs:

- Bognor Regis Town, promoted as play-off winners in Division One South
- Enfield Town, promoted as play-off winners in Division One North
- Hampton & Richmond Borough, relegated from the Conference South
- Leiston, promoted as champions of Division One North
- Thurrock, relegated from the Conference South
- Whitehawk, promoted as champions of Division One South

Whitehawk won the division to earn a second consecutive title and were promoted to the Conference South along with play-off winners Concord Rangers. Due to league expansion there were only two relegation places this season. Initially, Carshalton Athletic and Hastings United were relegated, but Thurrock were subsequently deducted three points for fielding a suspended player on the second day of the season. It sent Thurrock bottom of the table and they were relegated for a second consecutive season. A subsequent appeal was rejected. This allowed for an effective reprieve for Carshalton Athletic.

=== League table ===
Pos	Team	Pld	W	D	L	GF	GA	GD	Pts	Promotion or relegation
1	Whitehawk	42	25	13	4	88	42	+46	88	Promoted to the Conference South
2	Lowestoft Town	42	23	11	8	71	38	+33	80	Qualified for the play-offs
3	Wealdstone	42	22	13	7	70	38	+32	79	Qualified for the play-offs
4	Concord Rangers	42	22	10	10	80	54	+26	76	Qualified for the play-offs, then promoted to the Conference South
5	East Thurrock United	42	18	16	8	65	45	+20	70	Qualified for the play-offs
6	Metropolitan Police	42	20	10	12	65	56	+9	70	
7	Bury Town	42	19	9	14	66	64	+2	66	
8	Canvey Island	42	18	10	14	60	55	+5	64	
9	Margate	42	17	11	14	61	49	+12	62	
10	Hendon	42	16	12	14	48	50	−2	60	
11	Kingstonian	42	18	5	19	63	62	+1	59	
12	Leiston	42	13	17	12	55	57	−2	56	
13	Hampton & Richmond	42	13	14	15	58	56	+2	53	
14	Bognor Regis Town	42	15	8	19	48	58	−10	53	
15	Harrow Borough	42	12	9	21	53	71	−18	45	
16	Enfield Town	42	13	5	24	60	83	−23	44	
17	Cray Wanderers	42	10	13	19	60	85	−25	43	
18	Wingate & Finchley	42	12	6	24	56	82	−26	42	
19	Lewes	42	9	13	20	59	75	−16	40	
20	Carshalton Athletic	42	12	4	26	55	76	−21	40	
21	Hastings United	42	8	15	19	39	62	−23	39	Relegated to Division One South
22	Thurrock	42	11	8	23	40	62	−22	38 (Note: Thurrock were deducted three points for fielding a suspended player against Lewes on 25 August (2–0).)	Relegated to Division One North

Rules for classification: 1) points; 2) goal difference; 3) number of goals scored.

==== Top scorers ====
Player	Club	Goals
John Sands	Bury Town	27
Bradley Woods-Garness	Canvey Island	22
Tony Stokes	Concord Rangers	22
Jack Defty	Lowestoft Town	21
Nathaniel Pinney	Carshalton Athletic	21
Leigh Bremner	Cray Wanderers	21
Scott McGleish	Wealdstone	20
Liam Hope	Enfield Town	19
Gareth Heath	Leiston	18

=== Play-offs ===
==== Semi-finals ====
1 May 2013	Lowestoft Town	1–0	East Thurrock United	Crown Meadow, Lowestoft
19:45	Henderson 79'	Report Highlights		Attendance: 1,182

1 May 2013	Wealdstone	1–2 (a.e.t.)	Concord Rangers	Grosvenor Vale, Ruislip
19:45	Jolly 62'	Report Highlights	King 88'; Stokes 108'	Attendance: 1,055

==== Final ====
6 May 2013	Lowestoft Town	1-2	Concord Rangers	Crown Meadow, Lowestoft
15:00	Mitchell 20'	Report Highlights	King 11'; Gordon 85'	Attendance: 2,490; Referee: Lee Venamore

=== Results grid ===
Home \ Away	BOG	BUR	CAN	CAR	CON	CRA	ETU	ENF	H&R	HAR	HAS	HEN	KIN	LEI	LEW	LOW	MAR	MET	THU	WEA	WHI	W&F
Bognor Regis Town		5–1	2–2	2–1	0–1	0–2	1–0	0–0	0–5	0–3	1–0	3–1	0–1	1–1	3–1	0–2	0–2	0–0	1–0	0–1	1–3	1–0
Bury Town	2–0		1–0	1–1	0–4	0–2	1–2	2–1	0–1	0–1	1–0	1–2	1–0	3–3	2–1	1–1	2–2	0–2	3–1	0–0	1–3	4–2
Canvey Island	1–1	0–1		4–2	0–2	1–0	2–1	3–4	0–0	3–0	1–1	0–3	4–3	2–0	0–0	0–2	3–1	0–1	2–0	2–0	1–2	3–2
Carshalton Athletic	0–2	1–3	0–2		1–2	2–1	1–1	3–2	3–0	3–1	1–0	1–2	1–3	1–3	3–3	2–0	4–0	1–1	0–1	0–2	0–1	1–2
Concord Rangers	1–3	3–2	3–0	6–3		0–4	2–2	3–0	2–1	1–2	4–0	1–2	0–3	0–0	3–6	1–1	2–1	5–1	1–1	2–2	2–2	4–1
Cray Wanderers	1–3	2–2	1–1	3–2	0–2		2–2	1–5	2–0	2–1	0–3	0–1	1–3	0–0	2–2	1–1	0–4	1–2	0–1	0–3	1–2	3–4
East Thurrock United	4–4	1–3	2–0	4–0	3–1	1–1		2–0	1–2	2–0	1–0	2–0	1–1	2–2	1–0	0–2	0–0	2–2	1–0	0–2	1–1	2–0
Enfield Town	0–1	2–3	0–2	1–2	0–1	1–3	2–3		0–2	2–0	1–0	6–3	1–1	1–0	2–1	2–3	0–3	4–0	1–1	1–2	1–3	2–1
Hampton & Richmond	1–0	2–3	2–2	0–1	1–1	1–3	0–3	4–2		0–0	1–0	1–2	0–1	3–3	2–1	1–1	1–2	0–0	1–0	3–1	1–0	3–3
Harrow Borough	3–2	3–1	1–3	1–0	1–2	3–3	2–3	4–2	4–3		0–1	1–1	1–0	1–3	0–2	3–3	0–2	2–3	4–1	0–0	3–1	1–2
Hastings United	1–1	0–1	0–0	1–4	2–2	1–1	1–1	3–2	0–0	2–0		1–2	1–0	0–1	3–3	1–4	2–2	1–2	1–1	1–1	0–2	2–1
Hendon	1–0	2–2	1–2	3–1	2–2	0–0	0–0	2–3	0–3	1–2	2–0		1–0	2–1	2–2	0–1	0–0	1–1	1–0	0–0	1–1	0–2
Kingstonian	1–0	0–2	1–2	2–1	0–1	9–3	0–2	1–2	0–0	4–2	0–1	2–1		3–1	3–1	0–1	3–3	1–0	1–0	2–0	2–3	0–1
Leiston	1–1	0–0	1–1	1–0	0–3	1–1	5–4	3–1	2–2	1–0	3–1	0–1	2–2		1–1	0–0	1–2	0–2	2–1	1–1	0–2	3–0
Lewes	1–0	2–3	1–2	2–1	0–3	2–2	1–1	1–2	2–2	1–1	1–2	0–0	1–2	0–1		2–1	2–0	1–2	1–2	1–0	2–3	3–1
Lowestoft Town	1–2	1–0	2–0	2–3	4–1	4–1	0–0	0–0	5–3	3–0	1–0	1–0	1–3	1–1	2–0		1–0	2–1	0–1	3–0	0–0	3–0
Margate	3–0	3–1	2–2	3–1	0–2	0–1	0–1	2–0	2–1	0–0	1–1	2–0	1–2	2–0	1–1	2–1		1–2	3–1	2–4	2–1	2–0
Metropolitan Police	3–2	3–1	2–1	1–0	0–2	2–4	2–2	2–2	1–0	1–1	4–0	2–1	4–1	0–1	1–1	1–3	1–0		1–2	0–1	2–5	2–1
Thurrock	1–2	0–3	0–1	1–3	0–1	5–1	0–2	1–0	0–0	3–0	1–1	1–2	4–0	0–3	2–0	1–2	1–1	0–4		0–0	0–3	1–2
Wealdstone	1–0	2–3	2–0	3–0	2–1	2–0	1–1	4–0	3–2	2–0	3–0	2–1	5–2	2–0	6–1	0–0	2–1	1–0	2–2		1–1	2–3
Whitehawk	3–0	2–2	5–4	2–0	1–0	2–0	1–0	6–0	0–0	0–0	2–2	0–0	2–0	5–1	3–1	1–3	1–1	1–1	5–1	1–1		3–1
Wingate & Finchley	1–3	1–3	0–1	1–0	0–0	4–4	0–1	1–2	0–3	2–1	2–2	0–1	3–0	2–2	2–4	3–2	1–0	1–3	0–1	1–1	2–3	

Updated to match(es) played on 30 April 2013. Source: Ryman League Premier Division
Legend: Blue = home team win; Yellow = draw; Red = away team win.

=== Stadia and locations ===
Locations of the Premier Division teams
Greater London Premier Division football clubs

Club	Stadium	Capacity
Bognor Regis Town	Nyewood Lane	4,000
Bury Town	Ram Meadow	3,500
Canvey Island	Prospect Stadium	4,308
Carshalton Athletic	War Memorial Sports Ground	5,000
Concord Rangers	Thames Road	1,500
Cray Wanderers	Hayes Lane (groundshare with Bromley)	6,000
East Thurrock United	Rookery Hill	4,000
Enfield Town	Queen Elizabeth II Stadium	2,500
Hampton & Richmond Borough	Beveree Stadium	3,500
Harrow Borough	Earlsmead Stadium	3,070
Hastings United	The Pilot Field	4,050
Hendon	Vale Farm (groundshare with Wembley)	3,000
Kingstonian	Kingsmeadow (groundshare with AFC Wimbledon)	5,194
Leiston	Victory Road	2,500
Lewes	The Dripping Pan	3,000
Lowestoft Town	Crown Meadow	2,250
Margate	Hartsdown Park	2,100
Metropolitan Police	Imber Court	3,000
Thurrock	Ship Lane	3,500
Wealdstone	Grosvenor Vale	2,640
Whitehawk	The Enclosed Ground	2,000
Wingate & Finchley	The Harry Abrahams Stadium	1,500

== Division One North ==
Isthmian League Division One North
- Season: 2012–13
- Champions: Grays Athletic
- Promoted: Grays Athletic; Thamesmead Town
- Relegated: Ilford
- Matches: 462
- Goals: 1,522 (3.29 per match)
- Top goalscorer: 33 goals - Luke Callander (Heybridge Swifts)
- Highest attendance: 421 – Tilbury – Grays Athletic, (13 October)
- Total attendance: 49,180
- Average attendance: 106 (-23.6% to previous season)

Division One North consisted of 22 clubs, including 19 clubs from the previous season, and three new clubs:

- Aveley, relegated from the Premier Division
- Witham Town, promoted as champions of the Essex Senior League
- Wroxham, promoted as champions of the Eastern Counties League

Grays Athletic won the division and were promoted to the Premier Division along with play-off winners Thamesmead Town. Due to league expansion, there was only one relegation place this season. Ilford finished bottom of the table and were relegated from the division after seven seasons.

=== League table ===
Pos	Team	Pld	W	D	L	GF	GA	GD	Pts	Promotion or relegation
1	Grays Athletic	42	32	6	4	96	38	+58	102	Promoted to the Premier Division
2	Maldon & Tiptree	42	27	8	7	101	47	+54	89	Qualified for the play-offs
3	Thamesmead Town	42	28	4	10	85	49	+36	88	Qualified for the play-offs, then promoted to the Premier Division
4	Witham Town	42	24	7	11	71	49	+22	79	Qualified for the play-offs
5	Aveley	42	24	6	12	92	58	+34	78	Qualified for the play-offs
6	Heybridge Swifts	42	21	10	11	102	55	+47	73	
7	Soham Town Rangers	42	22	7	13	95	75	+20	73	
8	Romford	42	19	7	16	72	72	0	64	
9	Brentwood Town	42	17	8	17	63	62	+1	59	
10	Potters Bar Town	42	15	13	14	64	68	−4	58	Transferred to SFL Division One Central
11	Cheshunt	42	16	10	16	75	73	+2	55 (Note: Redbridge were deducted one point on 17 December for fielding an ineligible player. Cheshunt were deducted three points on 6 February for fielding an ineligible player.)	
12	Waltham Abbey	42	15	8	19	60	70	−10	53	
13	Chatham Town	42	13	13	16	59	65	−6	52	
14	Wroxham	42	12	14	16	68	64	+4	50	
15	Needham Market	42	12	13	17	61	62	−1	49	
16	Tilbury	42	18	9	15	69	62	+7	45 (Note: Tilbury were deducted eighteen points after the end of the season for fielding an ineligible player.)	
17	AFC Sudbury	42	12	9	21	57	84	−27	45	
18	Waltham Forest	42	10	10	22	54	72	−18	40	
19	Ware	42	10	6	26	59	105	−46	36	
20	Redbridge	42	7	6	29	42	105	−63	26	
21	Harlow Town	42	9	8	25	45	82	−37	25 (Note: Harlow Town were deducted ten points on 6 February for failing to notify the league that they had failed to make repayments under their company voluntary arrangement and had extended the term of their CVA.)	
22	Ilford	42	4	8	30	32	105	−73	20	Relegated to the Essex Senior League

Rules for classification: 1) points; 2) goal difference; 3) number of goals scored.

==== Top scorers ====
Player	Club	Goals
Luke Callander	Heybridge Swifts	33
Robert Mason	Soham Town Rangers	26
Alexander Read	Aveley	25
Jordan Cox	Aveley	25
Robert Whitnell	Witham Town	23

=== Play-offs ===
==== Semi-finals ====
30 April 2013	Maldon & Tiptree	3–1	Aveley	Wallace Binder Ground, Maldon
19:45	Boylan 38', 90'; Ellul 72'		Elbi 54'	Attendance: 234

30 April 2013	Thamesmead Town	3–2	Witham Town	Bayliss Avenue, Thamesmead
19:45	Edwards 21' (pen.); Addae 71'; Zanone 78'		Whitnell 54' (pen.); Taylor 73'	Attendance: 206

==== Final ====
5 May 2013	Maldon & Tiptree	2–2 (1–4 p)	Thamesmead Town	Wallace Binder Ground, Maldon
15:00	Berques 9'; Boylan 12'		Zanone 30'; Edwards 40' (pen.)	Attendance: 324
	Penalties
	Guy (penalty scored); McLeod (penalty missed); Bowditch (penalty missed)		(penalty scored) Donovan; (penalty scored) Addae; (penalty scored) Gordon-Young; (penalty scored) Edwards

=== Results grid ===
Home \ Away	SUD	AVE	BRE	CHA	CHE	GRY	HAR	HEY	ILF	M&T	NDH	POT	RED	ROM	SOH	THA	TIL	WAL	WFO	WAR	WIT	WRO
AFC Sudbury		2–3	0–4	1–1	1–3	3–1	3–2	0–2	0–1	2–1	0–0	1–1	6–1	3–6	0–2	1–1	1–1	2–0	1–0	2–0	0–1	2–4
Aveley	4–1		3–0	5–1	2–1	0–1	1–0	1–2	3–0	2–2	2–1	2–3	1–0	2–1	4–1	1–1	1–2	0–1	2–1	3–1	3–1	1–4
Brentwood Town	1–0	0–2		0–0	2–0	0–1	0–0	3–2	3–1	0–2	1–0	3–1	1–1	1–3	6–3	0–1	1–1	0–2	2–0	4–0	3–2	1–1
Chatham Town	2–0	1–2	2–1		2–2	1–4	2–1	1–0	1–0	0–2	0–2	1–2	2–1	5–0	0–0	2–3	1–2	4–0	2–4	2–3	0–2	1–1
Cheshunt	1–0	4–2	1–0	2–2		1–2	1–2	0–0	3–0	2–0	1–3	1–0	1–1	2–3	2–3	0–3	3–1	5–1	4–2	2–3	3–2	0–0
Grays Athletic	6–0	3–1	4–1	1–1	1–4		4–1	3–0	2–1	2–0	1–1	4–1	3–0	3–2	2–2	3–0	4–2	3–5	3–1	2–0	1–1	4–0
Harlow Town	1–2	3–4	0–5	1–2	2–2	1–2		0–2	3–0	0–1	0–3	0–1	1–0	2–3	3–6	0–4	1–0	0–0	1–1	0–2	2–2	2–0
Heybridge Swifts	4–2	1–1	1–3	2–2	3–2	1–2	0–1		3–0	1–0	2–2	2–1	11–0	3–0	2–8	2–2	4–2	3–1	4–0	2–2	3–1	1–1
Ilford	1–1	0–5	0–1	1–3	3–3	0–2	2–1	0–6		0–3	1–6	1–1	2–1	0–2	1–3	0–0	0–1	1–4	2–2	3–3	2–7	1–3
Maldon & Tiptree	3–1	0–0	5–1	4–3	6–1	2–1	9–1	1–0	1–0		1–0	3–2	2–2	1–1	4–1	1–0	3–3	0–0	5–2	4–3	2–1	4–0
Needham Market	1–3	4–1	1–1	0–1	2–2	0–1	2–2	2–2	3–0	1–3		0–2	2–1	2–2	2–3	0–5	1–1	0–0	1–6	2–0	1–3	0–0
Potters Bar Town	4–1	0–5	3–0	0–0	3–2	0–2	0–0	1–1	1–0	2–2	2–2		3–2	2–2	1–3	2–4	0–2	1–0	1–1	2–2	2–2	2–1
Redbridge	1–0	1–4	3–0	1–3	2–1	0–1	0–4	0–8	1–1	0–4	1–4	0–2		0–5	2–4	3–4	1–3	0–1	0–1	2–2	0–1	1–4
Romford	5–2	2–1	3–4	1–0	0–0	1–2	2–0	0–5	1–0	0–3	1–0	2–1	1–2		2–3	1–4	2–1	3–1	2–2	4–1	0–1	0–1
Soham Town Rangers	7–2	3–3	2–2	1–0	2–4	1–2	2–1	0–4	1–2	0–2	3–2	3–0	3–0	1–1		4–2	1–1	1–3	2–1	1–3	0–1	3–3
Thamesmead Town	1–0	3–2	1–2	4–0	2–3	1–2	2–1	4–1	4–0	2–1	0–3	3–2	1–0	3–1	1–0		1–0	3–0	2–1	1–0	0–1	2–1
Tilbury	1–1	1–3	1–1	5–1	2–1	0–1	1–0	2–1	3–2	2–4	2–1	2–2	4–1	1–2	0–1	0–1		0–2	1–0	6–1	2–1	3–2
Waltham Abbey	0–2	1–2	2–4	1–1	4–0	1–1	1–1	1–5	5–1	0–3	2–0	2–0	0–4	0–2	1–2	1–2	2–2		1–2	2–1	3–0	2–1
Waltham Forest	2–2	2–1	1–0	0–0	2–2	0–3	3–0	0–1	3–1	2–0	0–1	1–4	1–0	0–0	1–2	1–2	1–2	0–3		2–3	1–2	0–0
Ware	1–2	1–4	2–1	0–3	1–2	1–5	2–3	0–5	1–1	2–3	1–2	1–3	1–1	1–3	0–3	0–1	1–0	3–2	2–0		2–4	4–3
Witham Town	1–1	0–2	2–0	2–2	1–0	0–0	0–1	0–0	4–0	3–2	1–0	2–3	1–2	1–0	2–1	2–1	2–0	3–0	2–1	4–1		1–0
Wroxham	2–3	1–1	2–0	1–1	0–1	0–1	3–0	3–0	2–0	2–2	1–1	0–0	1–3	5–0	0–3	4–3	2–3	2–2	3–3	4–1	0–1	

Updated to match(es) played on 30 April 2013. Source: Ryman League Division One North
Legend: Blue = home team win; Yellow = draw; Red = away team win.

=== Stadia and locations ===
Locations of Division One North teams
Greater London Division One North teams

Club	Stadium	Capacity
AFC Sudbury	King's Marsh	3,800
Aveley	Mill Field	1,100
Brentwood Town	The Brentwood Centre Arena	1,800
Chatham Town	The Sports Ground	5,000
Cheshunt	Cheshunt Stadium	3,000
Grays Athletic	Rush Green	4,000
Harlow Town	Barrows Farm	3,500
Heybridge Swifts	Scraley Road	3,000
Ilford	Cricklefield Stadium	3,500
Maldon & Tiptree	Wallace Binder Ground	2,000
Needham Market	Bloomfields	4,000
Potters Bar Town	Parkfield	2,000
Redbridge	Oakside	3,000
Romford	Ship Lane (groundshare with Thurrock)	3,500
Soham Town Rangers	Julius Martin Lane	2,000
Thamesmead Town	Bayliss Avenue	6,000
Tilbury	Chadfields	4,000
Waltham Abbey	Capershotts	3,500
Waltham Forest	Cricklefield Stadium (groundshare with Ilford)	3,500
Ware	Wodson Park	3,300
Witham Town	Spa Road	2,500
Wroxham	Trafford Park	2,000

== Division One South ==
Isthmian League Division One South
- Season: 2012–13
- Champions: Dulwich Hamlet
- Promoted: Dulwich Hamlet; Maidstone United
- Relegated: None
- Matches: 462
- Goals: 1,389 (3.01 per match)
- Top goalscorer: 27 goals - David Cook (Hythe Town)
- Highest attendance: 2305 – Maidstone United – Horsham, (27 April)
- Total attendance: 122,344
- Average attendance: 265 (+31.8% to previous season)

Division One South consisted of 22 clubs, including 17 clubs from the previous season, and five new clubs:

- Herne Bay, promoted as champions of the Kent League
- Horsham, relegated from the Premier Division
- Leatherhead, relegated from the Premier Division
- Three Bridges, promoted as champions of the Sussex County League
- Tooting & Mitcham United, relegated from the Premier Division
- Crawley Down F.C. changed their name to Crawley Down Gatwick F.C.

Dulwich Hamlet won the division and were promoted to the Premier Division along with play-off winners Maidstone United, who returned after two seasons of absence. Due to league expansion, there was only one relegation place this season. Walton Casuals finished bottom of the table, but were reprieved for the second time in four seasons.

=== League table ===
Pos	Team	Pld	W	D	L	GF	GA	GD	Pts	Promotion or relegation
1	Dulwich Hamlet	42	28	5	9	91	42	+49	89	Promoted to the Premier Division
2	Maidstone United	42	26	10	6	96	39	+57	88	Qualified for the play-offs, then promoted to the Premier Division
3	Faversham Town	42	22	11	9	74	57	+17	77	Qualified for the play-offs
4	Hythe Town	42	22	10	10	78	55	+23	76	Qualified for the play-offs
5	Folkestone Invicta	42	19	14	9	73	49	+24	71	Qualified for the play-offs
6	Leatherhead	42	22	4	16	66	44	+22	70	
7	Ramsgate	42	20	10	12	60	44	+16	70	
8	Burgess Hill Town	42	16	15	11	54	46	+8	63	
9	Sittingbourne	42	16	13	13	67	56	+11	61	
10	Worthing	42	16	9	17	77	74	+3	57	
11	Eastbourne Town	42	16	9	17	62	61	+1	57	
12	Merstham	42	16	8	18	67	76	−9	56	
13	Crawley Down Gatwick	42	15	10	17	72	70	+2	55	
14	Corinthian-Casuals	42	10	16	16	39	54	−15	46	
15	Horsham	42	12	9	21	54	77	−23	45	
16	Tooting & Mitcham United	42	12	9	21	52	75	−23	45	
17	Whitstable Town	42	12	8	22	53	71	−18	44	
18	Walton & Hersham	42	11	11	20	48	77	−29	44	
19	Herne Bay	42	10	13	19	44	69	−25	43	
20	Chipstead	42	11	9	22	54	80	−26	42	
21	Three Bridges	42	11	7	24	58	83	−25	40	
22	Walton Casuals	42	9	10	23	50	90	−40	37	Reprieved from relegation

Rules for classification: 1) points; 2) goal difference; 3) number of goals scored.

==== Top scorers ====
Player	Club	Goals
David Cook	Hythe Town	27
Stuart King	Maidstone United	26
Ryan Golding	Sittingbourne	26
Ian Pulman	Ramsgate	22
Erhun Oztumer	Dulwich Hamlet	22

=== Play-offs ===
==== Semi-finals ====
30 April 2013	Maidstone United	1–0	Folkestone Invicta	Gallagher Stadium, Maidstone
19:45	Booth 76'			Attendance: 2,195

30 April 2013	Faversham Town	3–0	Hythe Town	Shepherd Neame Stadium, Faversham
19:45	Bourne 34', 36'; Tenyue 40'			Attendance: 606

==== Final ====
4 May 2013	Maidstone United	3–0	Faversham Town	Gallagher Stadium, Maidstone
15:00	Olorunda 11', 35'; Brown 68'			Attendance: 2,226

=== Results grid ===
Home \ Away	BUR	CHI	COR	CDG	DUL	EST	FAV	FOL	HER	HOR	HYT	LEA	MDS	MER	RAM	SIT	THR	T&M	W&H	WAL	WHT	WOR
Burgess Hill Town		3–1	2–1	0–3	3–3	0–0	0–1	1–3	2–0	4–1	0–1	1–1	0–2	0–2	0–0	2–1	2–0	2–0	2–1	1–3	2–0	3–1
Chipstead	0–0		2–2	1–5	0–1	2–5	1–2	1–3	2–2	3–1	1–4	0–2	1–4	0–1	3–0	1–0	3–0	3–3	2–2	1–0	2–2	0–4
Corinthian-Casuals	0–1	1–1		0–1	1–0	2–1	1–2	1–1	1–1	0–0	1–3	0–2	1–3	2–2	0–2	1–1	4–4	0–0	0–1	0–0	5–1	1–4
Crawley Down Gatwick	5–0	3–2	0–1		3–1	2–1	2–4	4–3	3–1	1–1	1–2	0–3	0–0	0–1	1–1	0–3	3–1	0–4	4–0	3–1	1–1	1–0
Dulwich Hamlet	1–1	2–1	3–0	3–1		4–2	1–1	2–0	2–1	4–0	0–2	3–1	1–1	4–1	3–0	3–1	2–0	2–2	3–0	5–0	3–0	3–0
Eastbourne Town	2–1	3–0	0–0	2–1	2–0		1–1	1–1	2–3	3–1	0–2	0–1	0–3	3–2	0–1	2–2	0–3	1–0	4–3	0–2	2–0	0–1
Faversham Town	2–1	0–2	0–0	1–1	0–2	3–3		0–1	1–1	3–1	3–2	1–0	0–4	4–2	1–1	3–0	2–2	1–0	1–4	7–0	1–4	1–2
Folkestone Invicta	1–1	3–2	0–0	2–1	0–2	2–2	2–2		1–0	2–1	1–1	2–0	2–2	1–3	3–1	0–0	3–1	1–0	5–0	3–0	2–1	2–1
Herne Bay	1–1	0–1	1–3	4–3	1–3	1–0	0–3	3–2		2–1	0–0	0–1	1–3	0–3	0–2	0–0	0–0	0–1	2–1	0–4	1–1	1–4
Horsham	0–1	4–1	1–1	1–4	1–4	1–3	1–2	2–1	0–1		3–4	1–0	1–1	1–0	0–2	4–3	4–1	3–1	0–0	2–0	2–0	0–0
Hythe Town	2–2	0–1	3–1	2–1	1–0	2–4	2–2	2–1	0–1	1–0		2–3	3–4	0–0	0–2	1–1	1–0	5–2	1–1	1–0	2–0	2–2
Leatherhead	0–1	0–1	0–1	4–0	1–0	3–2	0–1	1–1	1–0	1–2	0–1		0–1	3–1	1–2	0–1	1–1	2–2	3–1	4–0	1–0	1–3
Maidstone United	0–0	3–0	2–0	2–2	5–0	2–0	1–2	2–2	2–0	3–0	1–1	2–3		2–0	2–1	2–1	3–1	3–0	4–5	1–1	2–0	2–2
Merstham	1–1	1–4	0–0	2–4	3–1	3–1	1–2	2–1	2–4	2–2	1–4	3–1	1–3		0–2	2–1	0–1	2–1	2–1	1–0	2–1	0–3
Ramsgate	1–1	1–0	0–0	4–1	0–3	0–0	2–0	1–1	3–1	4–0	2–4	4–1	1–0	1–1		1–3	1–1	1–2	1–2	0–1	1–2	2–0
Sittingbourne	2–1	2–2	3–0	2–2	3–1	1–0	1–1	0–1	2–2	2–1	1–0	0–1	2–1	2–2	0–1		5–2	2–0	3–2	1–1	1–1	1–2
Three Bridges	0–0	4–1	1–2	3–1	1–2	0–2	0–1	0–2	0–3	4–1	2–1	1–3	0–3	1–3	2–3	1–2		2–3	1–0	2–3	3–2	2–2
Tooting & Mitcham United	1–1	1–1	3–0	1–0	0–2	0–1	1–2	0–5	0–0	1–3	3–2	0–3	0–5	2–4	1–3	2–2	0–2		1–1	0–2	3–2	5–2
Walton & Hersham	0–1	1–0	1–0	2–1	0–4	2–2	1–0	1–1	4–2	1–1	2–2	1–3	0–4	1–0	0–2	0–5	2–0	0–1		1–1	1–2	0–2
Walton Casuals	0–5	1–4	0–1	1–1	0–2	1–2	1–2	1–3	1–1	3–1	1–3	0–2	0–3	6–6	1–1	4–1	2–3	0–1	2–2		0–3	1–6
Whitstable Town	2–4	1–0	0–2	0–0	1–2	2–0	2–3	2–1	1–1	2–2	1–2	0–5	2–3	1–0	0–1	1–2	2–1	0–4	3–0	1–1		4–0
Worthing	0–0	3–0	1–2	2–2	1–4	0–3	3–5	1–1	2–2	1–2	3–4	1–3	2–0	4–2	2–1	2–1	3–4	2–0	0–0	3–4	0–2	

Updated to match(es) played on 30 April 2013. Source: Ryman League Division One South
Legend: Blue = home team win; Yellow = draw; Red = away team win.

=== Stadia and locations ===
Locations of Division One South teams
Greater London Division One South teams

Club	Stadium	Capacity
Burgess Hill Town	Leylands Park	2,000
Chipstead	High Road	2,000
Corinthian-Casuals	King George's Field	2,700
Crawley Down Gatwick	The Haven Sportsfield	1,000
Dulwich Hamlet	Champion Hill	3,000
Eastbourne Town	The Saffrons	3,000
Faversham Town	Shepherd Neame Stadium	2,000
Folkestone Invicta	Cheriton Road	4,000
Herne Bay	Winch's Field	4,000
Horsham	Gorings Mead	1,500
Hythe Town	Reachfields Stadium	3,000
Leatherhead	Fetcham Grove	3,400
Maidstone United	The Gallagher Stadium	2,226
Merstham	Moatside	2,000
Ramsgate	Southwood Stadium	2,500
Sittingbourne	Bourne Park	3,000
Three Bridges	Jubilee Field	1,500
Tooting & Mitcham United	Imperial Fields	3,500
Walton & Hersham	The Sports Ground	2,000
Walton Casuals	Waterside Stadium	2,000
Whitstable Town	The Belmont Ground	3,000
Worthing	Worthing Stadium	4,000

== League Cup ==
2012–13 Isthmian League Cup
Tournament details
- Country: England
- Teams: 66

Final positions
- Champions: Concord Rangers
- Runners-up: Dulwich Hamlet

Tournament statistics
- Matches played: 65
- Goals scored: 235 (3.62 per match)

The Isthmian League Cup 2012–13 was the 39th season of the Isthmian League Cup, the cup competition of the whole Isthmian League.

=== Calendar ===
Round	Dates	Matches	Clubs
First round	4 September	2	66 → 64
Second round	15 October to 24 October	32	64 → 32
Third round	19 November to 27 November	16	32 → 16
Fourth round	4 December to 15 January	8	16 → 8
Quarterfinals	15 January to 5 February	4	8 → 4
Semifinals	19 February	2	4 → 2
Final	9 April	1	2 → 1

=== First round ===
Four clubs from divisions One participated in the First round, while all other clubs received a bye to the Second round.

Tie	Home team (tier)	Score	Away team (tier)	Att.
1	Cheshunt	1–2	Soham Town Rangers	66
2	Chipstead	0–3	Three Bridges	72

=== Second round ===
The two clubs to have made it through the First round were entered into the draw with every other Isthmian League club, making sixty-four teams.

Tie	Home team (tier)	Score	Away team (tier)	Att.
3	Aveley	5–0	East Thurrock United	111
4	Chatham Town	0–2	Harrow Borough	89
5	Wealdstone	3–2	Ramsgate	147
6	AFC Sudbury	0–3	Leiston	122
7	Burgess Hill Town	0–0	Bognor Regis Town	108
Bognor Regis Town advance 4–3 on penalties
8	Canvey Island	6–0	Ilford	82
9	Corinthian-Casuals	1–1	Walton Casuals	56
Walton Casuals advance 4–3 on penalties
10	Faversham Town	4–3	Cray Wanderers	87
11	Grays Athletic	0–3	Waltham Forest	86
12	Harlow Town	0–2	Witham Town	58
13	Hastings United	1–0	Lewes	157
14	Horsham	2–1	Walton & Hersham	79
15	Leatherhead	0–0	Carshalton Athletic	74
Carshalton Athletic advance 4–1 on penalties
16	Maidstone United	4–0	Sittingbourne	831
17	Maldon & Tiptree	0–3	Bury Town	75
18	Margate	0–4	Metropolitan Police	79

Tie	Home team (tier)	Score	Away team (tier)	Att.
19	Needham Market	6–1	Ware	126
20	Redbridge	1–0	Potters Bar Town	27
21	Soham Town Rangers	1–1	Lowestoft Town	118
Soham Town Rangers advance 4–2 on penalties
22	Thamesmead Town	4–3	Waltham Abbey	25
23	Three Bridges	5–4	Hampton and Richmond Borough	58
24	Thurrock	2–0	Wingate & Finchley	55
25	Whitehawk	5–0	Merstham	44
26	Whitstable Town	4–3	Hythe Town	84
27	Worthing	3–2	Crawley Down Gatwick	81
28	Wroxham	4–2	Heybridge Swifts	74
29	Eastbourne Town	1–2	Dulwich Hamlet	73
30	Enfield Town	0–1	Brentwood Town	102
31	Folkestone Invicta	2–2	Kingstonian	77
Kingstonian advance 4–2 on penalties
32	Hendon	2–2	Tilbury	59
Tilbury advance 3–0 on penalties
33	Herne Bay	2–2	Tooting & Mitcham United	133
Herne Bay advance 7–6 on penalties
34	Romford	1–4	Concord Rangers	84

=== Third round ===
Tie	Home team (tier)	Score	Away team (tier)	Att.
35	Aveley	2–1	Tilbury	84
36	Bognor Regis Town	0–1	Whitehawk	172
37	Carshalton Athletic	1–2	Wealdstone	89
38	Dulwich Hamlet	5–1	Herne Bay	88
39	Faversham Town	0–1	Thamesmead Town	76
40	Harrow Borough	0–1	Kingstonian	80
41	Hastings United	6–4	Three Bridges	155
42	Leiston	1–1	Soham Town Rangers	128
Soham Town Rangers advance 5–3 on penalties
43	Redbridge	0–9	Concord Rangers	91

Tie	Home team (tier)	Score	Away team (tier)	Att.
44	Thurrock	0–0	Brentwood Town	45
Thurrock advance 4–3 on penalties
45	Whitstable Town	0–2	Maidstone United	156
46	Witham Town	2–4	Bury Town	35
47	Wroxham	1–1	Needham Market	106
Wroxham advance 4–3 on penalties
48	Metropolitan Police	5–3	Walton Casuals	65
49	Waltham Forest	3–1	Canvey Island	44
50	Horsham	1–2	Worthing	96

=== Fourth round ===
Tie	Home team (tier)	Score	Away team (tier)	Att.
51	Concord Rangers	2–1	Bury Town	116
52	Thamesmead Town	2–2	Aveley	37
Thamesmead Town advance 4–3 on penalties
53	Thurrock	1–1	Waltham Forest	46
Thurrock advance 6–5 on penalties
54	Whitehawk	2–0	Maidstone United	89

Tie	Home team (tier)	Score	Away team (tier)	Att.
55	Worthing	2–3	Hastings United	104
56	Wroxham	0–0	Soham Town Rangers	67
Wroxham advance 7–6 on penalties
57	Metropolitan Police	2–3	Kingstonian	90
58	Dulwich Hamlet	1–0	Wealdstone	85

=== Quarterfinals ===
Tie	Home team (tier)	Score	Away team (tier)	Att.
59	Hastings United	4–3	Whitehawk	289
60	Thamesmead Town	0–0	Thurrock	40
Thamesmead Town advance 4–2 on penalties

Tie	Home team (tier)	Score	Away team (tier)	Att.
61	Concord Rangers	2–0	Wroxham	87
62	Dulwich Hamlet	4–1	Kingstonian	112

=== Semifinals ===
Tie	Home team (tier)	Score	Away team (tier)	Att.
63	Concord Rangers	3–0	Hastings United	110
64	Dulwich Hamlet	1–1	Thamesmead Town	147
Dulwich Hamlet advance 5–3 on penalties

=== Final ===
9 April 2013	Concord Rangers	3–2 (a.e.t.)	Dulwich Hamlet	Gallagher Stadium, Maidstone
19:45	Stokes 62'; Greenhalgh 79'; Cowley 107'	Highlights Report	Green 11', 65'	Attendance: 466

== See also ==
- Isthmian League
- 2012–13 Northern Premier League
- 2012–13 Southern Football League
