= 2010–11 Kent Football League =

The 2010–11 Kent Football League season (known as the Safety Net Associates Kent Football League for sponsorship reasons) was the 45th in the history of Kent Football League a football competition in England.

The League structure comprised three divisions: a Premier Division together with Divisions One and Two – the latter two were known as the Reserves Section, comprising reserves teams which were not permitted in the Premier Division. Additionally there were two league cup competitions, the Challenge Cup for the Premier Division clubs and another for the teams in the two divisions of the Reserves Section.

== Premier Division ==
Kent Football League Premier Division
- Season: 2010–11
- Champions: Hythe Town
- Promoted: Hythe Town
- Matches: 240
- Goals: 813 (3.39 per match)

The division featured 16 teams, 15 of which competed in the previous season together with one additional club:

- VCD Athletic, demoted from the Isthmian League

At the end of the season Hythe Town were promoted to the Isthmian League Division One South and Sporting Bengal United transferred to the Essex Senior League.

=== League table ===
Pos	Team	Pld	W	D	L	GF	GA	GD	Pts	Promotion
1	Hythe Town	30	21	5	4	82	33	+49	68	Promoted to the Isthmian League Division One South
2	Herne Bay	30	20	8	2	64	30	+34	68	
3	VCD Athletic	30	13	13	4	51	33	+18	52	
4	Greenwich Borough	30	16	2	12	65	42	+23	50	
5	Erith & Belvedere	30	14	7	9	60	40	+20	49	
6	Tunbridge Wells	30	13	6	11	64	48	+16	45	
7	Sevenoaks Town	30	14	3	13	45	50	−5	45	
8	Erith Town	30	11	9	10	54	44	+10	42	
9	Norton Sports	30	10	10	10	52	64	−12	40	
10	Beckenham Town	30	12	3	15	56	55	+1	39	
11	Deal Town	30	10	5	15	39	52	−13	35	
12	Corinthian	30	10	5	15	38	59	−21	35	
13	Lordswood	30	9	7	14	41	50	−9	34	
14	Holmesdale	30	5	8	17	33	54	−21	23	
15	Sporting Bengal United	30	6	5	19	39	92	−53	23	Transferred to the Essex Senior League
16	Fisher	30	6	4	20	30	67	−37	22	

Source: FCHD
Rules for classification: 1) points; 2) goal difference; 3) number of goals scored.

=== Results ===
Home \ Away	BEC	COR	DEA	E&B	ERI	FIS	GRE	HER	HOL	HYT	LOR	NOR	SEV	SPB	TUN	VCD
Beckenham Town		6–0	1–2	3–2	2–0	1–2	1–0	1–2	4–0	0–2	0–2	6–4	1–2	2–5	2–4	0–0
Corinthian	4–2		1–0	2–1	1–1	0–2	2–5	0–2	2–1	1–7	4–1	2–2	0–1	2–0	2–0	1–1
Deal Town	1–0	1–2		1–1	2–0	0–1	0–3	0–2	1–1	0–3	1–0	0–2	4–2	1–0	3–4	1–1
Erith & Belvedere	2–0	3–0	4–2		0–3	3–1	2–0	2–2	0–2	1–4	7–2	4–0	1–2	1–1	1–1	1–1
Erith Town	0–1	3–3	4–0	0–2		2–0	2–1	4–1	2–0	0–2	2–2	1–1	2–0	9–0	0–0	2–2
Fisher	2–4	0–2	3–3	1–0	2–4		1–3	0–3	1–2	0–2	1–0	1–1	0–1	1–3	0–5	2–0
Greenwich Borough	2–1	2–0	0–1	2–3	2–1	5–1		1–1	1–0	2–1	2–1	4–0	1–2	8–0	3–2	3–2
Herne Bay	2–0	1–0	3–1	1–2	4–0	2–1	3–1		2–1	0–0	3–1	1–1	2–1	2–0	5–0	2–2
Holmesdale	2–2	1–1	0–1	2–3	2–0	1–1	1–2	1–1		2–2	3–1	3–0	2–3	1–1	0–3	1–4
Hythe Town	6–2	1–0	1–2	2–1	3–0	1–0	2–0	2–2	3–2		3–4	4–2	2–1	8–0	3–1	1–1
Lordswood	0–2	2–0	1–1	0–1	1–1	2–0	2–2	2–2	2–0	0–3		1–1	2–1	0–1	3–0	1–3
Norton Sports	0–1	1–0	4–3	0–7	3–3	2–2	3–2	1–2	2–1	3–1	1–3		3–0	6–2	0–4	2–2
Sevenoaks Town	2–4	2–0	2–1	1–4	2–1	2–0	3–1	2–4	2–0	0–4	0–2	2–2		2–2	4–1	0–1
Sporting Bengal United	3–6	2–3	0–4	1–1	2–3	4–3	0–5	1–3	4–1	2–4	2–1	0–2	0–1		1–1	0–1
Tunbridge Wells	0–0	4–0	3–2	2–0	3–4	7–1	0–2	0–1	3–0	2–2	2–2	0–1	2–1	7–1		0–3
VCD Athletic	1–0	4–3	3–0	1–1	0–0	1–0	3–0	2–3	1–1	3–2	1–0	2–2	0–0	3–1	1–3	

Source: Kent League (archived)
Legend: Blue = home team win; Yellow = draw; Red = away team win.

=== Challenge Cup ===
The 2010–11 Kent Football League Challenge Cup, known as the Safety Net Associates Kent League Cup for sponsorship reasons, was won by Herne Bay.

The competition was contested by the 16 teams from the Premier Division over a total of four rounds: three on an aggregate basis (home and away matches) followed by a final match played on a neutral ground (at Folkestone Invicta F.C. this season).

==== Quarter-finals, Semi-finals and Final ====
Quarter-finals
Herne Bay	2	3	5
Norton Sports	0	2	2
Corinthian	1	2	3
Beckenham Town	2	0	2
Sevenoaks Town	2	1	3
Hythe Town	2	2	4
VCD Athletic	1	2	3
Erith & Belvedere	1	0	1

Semi-finals
Herne Bay	1	2	3
Corinthian	0	0	0
Hythe Town	2	5	7
VCD Athletic	1	1	2

Final
Herne Bay	3
Hythe Town	2

==== First Round ====
- Herne Bay 5 – 1 Sporting Bengal United (1st Leg 4–0; 2nd Leg 1–1)
- Erith Town 3 – 6 Norton Sports (1st Leg 2–3; 2nd Leg 1–3)
- Corinthian 3 – 1 Deal Town (1st Leg 0–0; 2nd Leg 3–1)
- Beckenham Town 9 – 1 Fisher (1st Leg 4–0; 2nd Leg 5–1)
- Sevenoaks Town 5 – 2 Tunbridge Wells (1st Leg 0–1; 2nd Leg 5–1)
- Lordswood d – W Hythe Town (1st Leg 2–0; 2nd Leg – ), Lordswood disqualified (playing unregistered players).
- Greenwich Borough 3 – 4 VCD Athletic (1st Leg 1–2; 2nd Leg 2–2)
- Erith & Belvedere W – d Holmesdale (1st Leg 1–1; 2nd Leg – ), Holmesdale disqualified.

Source: SCEFL Archives

== Reserves Section ==
The letter "R" following team names indicates a club's reserves team.

The 2010–11 Reserves Section comprised two divisions, with promotion and relegation possible between the divisions. Promotion from the Reserves Section into the Premier Division was not permitted. There was a single League Cup competition for all teams in the section.

=== Division One ===
Kent Football League Division One
- Season: 2010–11
- Champions: Cray Wanderers R
- Matches: 72
- Goals: 349 (4.85 per match)

At the commencement of the season the division comprised ten clubs, eight of which competed in the previous season together with Erith Town R and Beckenham Town R who had both been promoted from Division Two. The latter club resigned from the league mid-season and their record was expunged.

At the end of the season Thamesmead Town R and Cray Wanderers R left the league.

==== League table ====
Pos	Team	Pld	W	D	L	GF	GA	GD	Pts	Season End Notes
1	Cray Wanderers R	16	10	3	3	59	19	+40	33	Resigned from the League
2	Whitstable Town R	16	7	3	6	36	37	−1	24	
3	Maidstone United R	16	6	5	5	34	40	−6	23	
4	Erith Town R	16	6	4	6	29	25	+4	22	
5	Herne Bay R	16	6	4	6	34	34	0	22	
6	Thamesmead Town R	16	6	4	6	25	31	−6	22	Resigned from the League
7	Chatham Town R	16	5	4	7	26	29	−3	19	
8	Margate R	16	4	6	6	30	41	−11	18	
9	Erith & Belvedere R	16	4	3	9	19	36	−17	15	
10	Beckenham Town R	0	0	0	0	0	0	0	0	Resigned from the league, record expunged

Source: Kent League (archived)
Rules for classification: 1) points; 2) goal difference; 3) number of goals scored.

==== Results ====
Home \ Away	CHA	CRA	E&B	ERI	HER	MAI	MAR	THA	WHI
Chatham Town R		1–3	1–2	1–1	4–2	1–1	1–0	1–2	4–0
Cray Wanderers R	1–2		0–0	2–1	2–3	2–2	4–5	1–1	9–0
Erith & Belvedere R	4–1	1–6		0–1	2–1	1–2	2–2	2–1	0–2
Erith Town R	1–1	1–3	4–0		2–4	2–0	2–2	2–1	3–1
Herne Bay R	4–1	0–5	5–1	3–3		1–3	2–1	1–2	2–1
Maidstone United R	4–2	0–7	5–1	2–0	3–3		5–5	3–1	0–4
Margate R	2–1	1–5	1–0	2–1	2–2	2–2		1–1	2–5
Thamesmead Town R	1–1	0–5	1–0	2–5	1–0	2–0	5–1		2–6
Whitstable Town R	1–3	1–3	3–3	1–0	1–1	6–2	2–1	2–2	

Source: Kent League (archived)
Legend: Blue = home team win; Yellow = draw; Red = away team win.

=== Division Two ===
Kent Football League Division Two
- Season: 2010–11
- Champions: Faversham Town R
- Matches: 90
- Goals: 349 (3.88 per match)

The division featured ten clubs, eight of which competed in the previous season together with two additional clubs:

- Holmesdale R, relegated from Division One
- Greenwich Borough R returning to the league after a one season absence

At the end of the season Faversham Town R and Deal Town R were promoted to Division One and Greenwich Borough R and Hythe Town R left the league.

==== League table ====
Pos	Team	Pld	W	D	L	GF	GA	GD	Pts	Season End Notes
1	Faversham Town R	18	15	3	0	58	16	+42	48	Promoted to Division One
2	Deal Town R	18	15	2	1	50	11	+39	47	Promoted to Division One
3	Holmesdale R	18	6	6	6	24	38	−14	24	
4	Lordswood R	18	6	4	8	31	40	−9	22	
5	Sevenoaks Town R	18	6	3	9	33	36	−3	21	
6	Ramsgate R	18	6	3	9	39	45	−6	21	
7	Greenwich Borough R	18	6	2	10	25	40	−15	20	Resigned from the League
8	VCD Athletic R	18	5	4	9	31	35	−4	19	
9	Hythe Town R	18	4	4	10	28	39	−11	16	Resigned from the League
10	Folkestone Invicta R	18	4	3	11	30	49	−19	15	

Source: Kent League (archived)
Rules for classification: 1) points; 2) goal difference; 3) number of goals scored.

==== Results ====
Home \ Away	DEA	FAV	FOL	GRE	HOL	HYT	LOR	RAM	SEV	VCD
Deal Town R		1–1	5–0	3–0	3–0	2–1	3–0	2–1	3–1	3–0
Faversham Town R	2–1		7–1	3–1	5–2	3–0	6–1	2–1	3–1	3–1
Folkestone Invicta R	0–2	0–4		0–2	3–3	2–4	6–2	5–0	3–2	0–3
Greenwich Borough R	0–6	0–3	1–1		0–0	1–2	0–1	2–0	1–5	2–0
Holmesdale R	2–2	0–5	3–1	3–2		2–1	2–0	1–1	0–3	2–0
Hythe Town R	1–2	1–2	2–1	1–4	1–2		1–2	5–3	0–3	2–2
Lordswood R	1–4	0–2	2–0	5–0	0–0	2–2		2–3	3–4	3–2
Ramsgate R	0–5	2–4	4–4	2–4	6–0	3–1	4–4		1–0	4–0
Sevenoaks Town R	0–1	1–1	2–1	4–2	2–0	1–1	0–2	1–4		2–4
VCD Athletic R	1–2	2–2	1–2	1–3	4–0	2–2	1–1	3–0	4–2	

Source: Kent League (archived)
Legend: Blue = home team win; Yellow = draw; Red = away team win.

=== Reserves Cup ===
The 2010–11 Kent Football League Reserves Cup, known as the Blu3 Kent Reserves League Cup for sponsorship reasons, was won by Cray Wanderers R who achieved a League and Cup double.

The competition was contested over a total of five rounds: the first three were single match knock-out rounds, followed by the semi-finals on an aggregate basis (home and away matches) and then the final match played on a neutral ground (at Corinthian F.C. this season). The initial draw featured 21 teams, the 20 from Division One and Division Two plus Ashford Town (Kent) R who did not participate as the club folded prior to the start of the matches.

==== Quarter-finals, Semi-finals and Final ====
Quarter-finals
Lordswood R	0
Cray Wanderers R	4
Thamesmead Town R	6 (Note: After extra time, score at 90 minutes: 2–2)
Deal Town R	2
Whitstable Town R	2
Erith & Belvedere R	4
Chatham Town R	2
Herne Bay R	1

Semi-finals
Cray Wanderers R	2	1	3
Thamesmead Town R	0	2	2
Erith & Belvedere R	1	2	3
Chatham Town R	0	2	2

Final
Cray Wanderers R	3
Erith & Belvedere R	1

==== Second Round ====
- Whitstable Town R 3 – 1 Holmesdale R
- Thamesmead Town R 1 – 0 Erith Town R
- Deal Town R 5 – 0 Hythe Town R
- Erith & Belvedere R 2 – 0 Faversham Town R
- Chatham Town R 1 – 0 VCD Athletic R
- Ashford Town (Kent) R x – W Lordswood R (Ashford Town (Kent) R withdrawn)
- Cray Wanderers R 3 – 2 Sevenoaks Town R
- Herne Bay R 4 – 0 Ramsgate R

==== First Round ====
- Cray Wanderers R 6 – 2 Greenwich Borough R
- Maidstone United R 2 – 3 Erith & Belvedere R
- Beckenham Town R 1 – 2 Sevenoaks Town R
- Holmesdale R 2 – 1 Margate R
- Folkestone Invicta R 1 – 2 Herne Bay R

Byes for the remaining eleven teams

Source: SCEFL Archives
