= 2011–12 Essex Senior Football League =

The 2011–12 season was the 41st in the history of Essex Senior Football League a football competition in England.

The season featured 18 clubs, 17 of which had competed in the previous season, along with one new club:

- Sporting Bengal United, transferred from the Kent League

Also, Mauritius Sports changed their name to Haringey & Waltham Development.

Witham Town were champions, winning their third Essex Senior League title and returned to the Isthmian League after three seasons in the Essex Senior League.

== League table ==
Essex Senior Football League
- Season: 2011–12
- Champions: Witham Town
- Promoted: Witham Town
- Matches: 306
- Goals: 1,076 (3.52 per match)

Pos	Team	Pld	W	D	L	GF	GA	GD	Pts	Promotion or relegation
1	Witham Town	34	25	7	2	114	25	+89	82	Promoted to the Isthmian League
2	Southend Manor	34	23	6	5	72	32	+40	75	
3	Takeley	34	21	5	8	68	40	+28	68	
4	Burnham Ramblers	34	18	7	9	74	44	+30	61	
5	Barking	34	18	3	13	78	55	+23	57	
6	Enfield 1893	34	16	9	9	55	32	+23	57	
7	Barkingside	34	17	6	11	60	42	+18	57	
8	Sawbridgeworth Town	34	16	8	10	68	54	+14	56	
9	Bethnal Green United	34	15	6	13	53	53	0	51	
10	Hullbridge Sports	34	11	10	13	63	66	−3	43	
11	Sporting Bengal United	33	11	9	13	49	63	−14	39 (Note: Sporting Bengal United and Stansted were deducted three points each.)	
12	Eton Manor	34	10	7	17	44	85	−41	37	
13	Haringey & Waltham Development	34	9	9	16	58	69	−11	36	
14	London APSA	34	8	6	20	46	87	−41	30	
15	Bowers & Pitsea	34	6	9	19	47	77	−30	26 (Note: Bowers & Pitsea were deducted one point.)	
16	Stansted	34	7	8	19	50	82	−32	26	
17	Clapton	34	6	8	20	35	78	−43	26	
18	Basildon United	33	3	7	23	42	92	−50	16	

Source: The FA website
Rules for classification: 1) points; 2) goal difference; 3) number of goals scored.
