= Alex Brown (footballer, born 1992) =

English footballer (born 1992)

Personal information
- Date of birth: 30 September 1992 (age 34)
- Place of birth: Woodham Ferrers, England
- Position: Midfielder

Team information
- Current team: Hythe Town

Youth career
- 2003–2011: Gillingham

Senior career*
Years	Team	Apps	(Gls)
2011–2013	Gillingham	1	(0)
2012	→ Whitstable Town (loan)	?	(?)
2012	→ Corby Town (loan)	1	(0)
2012–2013	→ Maidstone United (loan)	5	(2)
2013–2016	Maidstone United	110	(21)
2015–2016	→ Leatherhead (loan)	5	(0)
2016	Leatherhead	5	(0)
2016–2018	Dartford	68	(9)
2018–2019	Margate	7	(2)
2019–	Hythe Town	0	(0)
- * Club domestic league appearances and goals as of 10:05, 20 September 2018 (UTC)

Alex Brown (born 30 September 1992) is an English footballer who plays as a central or right-sided midfielder for Hythe Town.

== Career ==
Midfield player Brown came through the ranks at Gillingham, signing his first professional contract at the club in the 2011 close season. Shortly afterwards, in September 2011, Brown got his first taste of senior football as he went out on loan to Isthmian League Division One South outfit Whitstable Town.

On the last day of the 2011-12 season, Brown made his first team debut for Gillingham, coming on as an 83rd-minute substitute in the side's 2–0 win against Morecambe.

In October 2012 Brown moved out on loan to Corby Town of the Conference North with fellow Gills player Jack Evans.

On 10 December 2012 Brown once again signed on loan for an Isthmian League Division One South side, this time signing an initial month's deal at Maidstone United. He made his debut a day later, coming off the bench and getting an assist in a 3–1 win against Three Bridges. Brown got his first goal for the club in his second appearance, scoring the equalising goal against Halifax Town in a FA Trophy game that ended 2–1 to the Shaymen.

On 3 January 2013, Brown was one of seven Gillingham players made available for a free transfer by manager Martin Allen. Brown subsequently signed permanently for Maidstone, signing a contract until the end of the 2012-13 season.

Brown went on loan to Leatherhead in December 2015 and made the move permanent in January 2016 but at the end of the season he left the Tanners. On 25 June 2016 Brown joined National League South side Dartford for the 2016–17 season. At the end of the 2017–18 season, after Dartford missed out on promotion back to the National League, Brown left the club.

On 19 May 2018, Brown signed for Margate in the Isthmian League Premier Division.
