= Tony Stokes =

English footballer

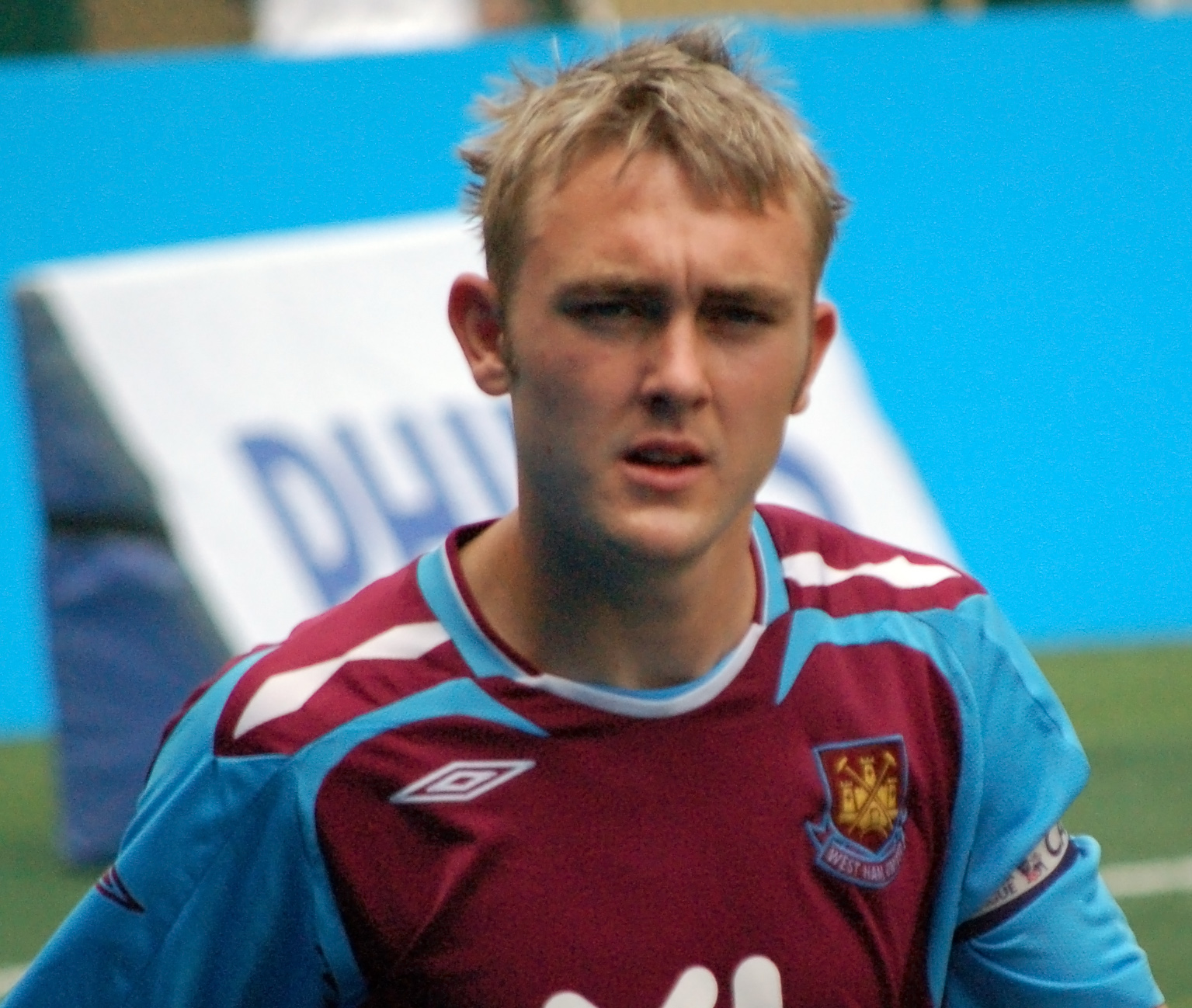
- Stokes with West Ham United in 2008

Personal information
- Full name: Anthony Ronald Stokes
- Date of birth: 7 January 1987 (age 39)
- Place of birth: Bethnal Green, England
- Position: Forward

Senior career*
| Years | Team | Apps | (Gls) |
| 2005–2009 | West Ham United | 0 | (0) |
| 2006 | → Rushden & Diamonds (loan) | 19 | (0) |
| 2006 | → Brighton & Hove Albion (loan) | 6 | (0) |
| 2007–2008 | → Stevenage Borough (loan) | 3 | (1) |
| 2009 | → Újpest (loan) | 13 | (0) |
| 2009–2010 | Újpest | 11 | (0) |
| 2010–2015 | Concord Rangers | 124 | (78) |
| 2013 | → Canvey Island (loan) | 4 | (3) |
| 2015–2016 | Canvey Island | 28 | (5) |
| 2016 | → Southend Manor (loan) | 2 | (0) |
| 2016–2017 | Concord Rangers | 16 | (4) |
| 2017–2018 | Bowers & Pitsea | 25 | (8) |
| 2018–2019 | Brentwood Town | 64 | (21) |
| 2019–2020 | Grays Athletic | 7 | (6) |
| 2020–2021 | Tilbury | 8 | (1) |
| 2021–2022 | Hullbridge Sports | 28 | (14) |
| Total | | 358 | (141) |
- * Club domestic league appearances and goals

Anthony Ronald Stokes (born 7 January 1987) is an English retired footballer who played as a forward. He made one League Cup appearance for West Ham United, and played in the Football League on loan at Rushden & Diamonds and Brighton & Hove Albion. After a spell in the Hungarian top flight at Újpest, he played non-League football for the rest of his career.

== Career ==
Stokes came up through the West Ham United academy along with Mark Noble and Kyel Reid. He made his first team debut and only appearance for West Ham at the age of 18 on 20 September 2005 as an 86th-minute substitute for Tomáš Řepka in the second round of the League Cup, a 4–2 win away to Sheffield Wednesday.

During the 2005–06 season, Stokes was loaned to Conference National side Rushden & Diamonds, where he made 19 appearances. He joined Football League One side Brighton & Hove Albion in a one-month loan deal in August 2006, which was extended for a second month but he decided to return to West Ham after finding first-team opportunities at Brighton difficult. He made seven appearances in all competitions for Brighton.

Stokes joined Stevenage Borough on a two-month loan in November 2007. He scored his first career goal in the 3–1 win over Salisbury City in December 2007. He was named reserve team captain when Jack Collison was promoted to the first team for the 2008–09 season. However, he found first team football hard to come by as Collison, Valon Behrami, Scott Parker and Mark Noble were the preferred starters and did not even make the bench on most occasions.

On 19 February 2009, Stokes joined Újpest on loan until the end of the 2008–09 season. He made his competitive debut for Ujpest on 7 March 2009 in a 2–0 home win against Siófok. He was released by West Ham on 3 June 2009, and signed for Újpest FC the following month, ahead of the 2009–10 Nemzeti Bajnokság I season.

Stokes requested that his two-year contract be terminated early and he returned to England in May 2010. In July 2010, he signed for Isthmian League Premier Division side, Concord Rangers. He was a key part of their strong start, contributing 20 goals from 41 league appearances in his first season and was made captain for the 2012–13 season, after rejecting interest from Conference South side Chelmsford City in November 2011. In 2012, he gained promotion with Concord to the Conference South, scoring the winning goal in extra time in the play-off semi-final against Wealdstone.

In October 2015, Stokes moved from Concord Rangers to local rivals Canvey Island where he had spent a brief loan spell two years earlier. On 10 June 2019, he joined Grays Athletic. In October 2020, Stokes joined Tilbury, before signing for Hullbridge Sports in October 2021. On 13 March 2022, he announced he would be retiring from football at the end of the 2021–22 season.
