= Thamesmead Town F.C. =

Coordinates: 51°30′18.119″N 0°7′46.999″E

Thamesmead Town
- Full name: Thamesmead Town Football Club
- Nickname: The Mead
- Founded: 1969
- Dissolved: 2018
- Ground: Bayliss Avenue, Thamesmead
Home colours	Away colours

Thamesmead Town Football Club was a football club originally based in Thamesmead in south-east London before moving to Dartford in 2017. They joined the Kent League in 1991 and reached the 5th round of the FA Vase in the 1995–96 season. In the 2007–08 season, they were champions of the Kent League Premier Division and were promoted to the Isthmian League Division One North for the 2008–09 season. In the 2012–13 season, they won the Division One North play-offs and were promoted to the Isthmian League Premier Division for the first time in their history, but were relegated back after finishing 22nd the following season. The club announced it was folding in October 2018 and subsequently closed down.

== History ==
Thamesmead F.C. was formed in 1969 as a community team for local youngsters. The club merged with Southlake FC in 1973, and by 1979 were fielding a Saturday team, playing on park pitches at Crossways. In 1980 the club entered the London Spartan League at the Intermediate Division Three level. They dominated the intermediate divisions in the early 1980s, but were unable to gain promotion to the Senior Division until they gained senior status. At around this time, they played matches at the Meridian Sports Ground in Charlton.

In 1985, the club changed its name to Thamesmead Town FC, and later that year they relocated to Bayliss Avenue. The club finally gained senior status during the summer of 1987 and were accepted into the London Spartan League Premier Division for the 1987–88 season. The club joined the Kent League in June 1990, where they remained until 2008, generally finishing amongst the top half dozen in the table. In 2002–03, they missed the runner-up spot on goal difference, despite having scored more points than league champions Cray Wanderers. This was due to placings being decided on points per game after Faversham Town failed to complete the season.

In 2007–08, Thamesmead Town were champions of the Kent League, winning the title on the last day of the season. The title ensured promotion to the Isthmian League, where they were elected to play in Division One North in 2008–09. In 2012–13, Thamesmead finished 3rd in this division. They beat Witham Town 3–2 in the play-off semi-final and Maldon & Tiptree on penalties in the final to gain promotion to the Isthmian League Premier Division for the first time in their history. The following season, however, Thamesmead were relegated back to Division One North. At the end of January 2015 manager Keith McMahon quit the club after 11 years at the helm. Due to the club owner's inability to find a new buyer, along with low match attendance and little income revenue, partly due to the lack of a home stadium, after moving from Thamesmead to groundshare with Dartford in 2017, the club announced its closure in October 2018.

== Stadium ==
Thamesmead played for most their history at Bayliss Avenue. The stadium has an official capacity is 6,000 (the vast majority standing). The ground was officially opened in August 1988 with a match against the then FA Cup holders Wimbledon. The clubhouse, pitches and car park and other original facilities were constructed at a cost of £450,000, and further improvements were carried out in 2000, including the addition of perimeter railings and hard standing on the dugout side of the pitch. Improvements have continued since then, including the erection of a new 125 seat stand, replacing two smaller stands with bench seating.

The club carried out remedial work to the ground in March 2008, in order to comply with ground requirements to play at Isthmian League level. This work included adding 36 seats to the seated stand (increasing the seating capacity to 161), building a temporary covered stand, enclosing the ground with a wooden fence and adding two turnstiles as well as outside toilet facilities. Development began on a new £4.2m redevelopment of the Bayliss Avenue ground in May 2009 as part of the Sporting Club Thamesmead project, co-ordinated and partly funded by local leading development agency, Trust Thamesmead. After several delays, the new facilities and arena were opened in July 2013.

The main arena has a main stand with 500 seats and a balcony overlooking the main pitch from the pavilion (this is in addition to the existing 161 seater stand, relocated to behind the goal in 2009–10 to enable development). The pavilion contains a bar, changing facilities and an indoor sports hall and gym. The main arena pitch is surrounded by terracing, covered at one end, with the rest of the ground consisting of a second 3G sports pitch, two additional football pitches and multi-use outdoor sports facilities available seven days a week to the local community.

Thamesmead Town left Bayliss Avenue in 2017 to ground share at Dartford's Princes Park ground.

== Crest ==
The club crest was a traditional shield in design, white in the background with green writing and logo.

The three wavy lines at the top denote the River Thames, which is just 200 yards from the club's Bayliss Avenue ground. Below this are two cannons, in between which is the club's full name.

The cannons derive from the town's previous use as a military testing ground for the artillery munitions works in neighbouring Woolwich. Before the town of Thamesmead was built in the 1960s, the land consisted primarily of marshes where, since the 18th century, shots would be fired to test the accuracy and range of heavy artillery designed and built at the munitions works.

Until 2009/10, the crest prominently displayed the club's initials, T.T.F.C. which had been an original part of the breast design. This was removed in a modified version of the badge, published in summer 2009.

== Mascot ==
The club's mascot was Tommy The Thamesmead Toad. Tommy was a 6-foot-tall (1.8 m) green toad, dressed in the Thamesmead Town kit.

== Honours ==
- London Junior Cup:
  - Finalists (1): 1983–84
- Kent Junior Cup A
  - Winners: 1983–84
  - Finalists: 1984–85

== Records ==
- Best league position: 22nd in Isthmian League Premier Division, 2013–14
- Best FA Cup performance: 2nd qualifying round, 1998–99, 2003–04, 2004–05; 2008–09, 2013–14
- Best FA Vase performance: 5th round, 1995–96
- Record victory: 9–0 v Kent Police (home) 19 April 1994
