= 2003–04 Northern Counties East Football League =

The 2003–04 Northern Counties East Football League season was the 22nd in the history of Northern Counties East Football League, a football competition in England.

== Premier Division ==
Northern Counties East Football League Premier Division
- Season: 2003–04
- Champions: Ossett Albion
- Promoted: Brigg Town; Eastwood Town; Ossett Albion
- Matches: 380
- Goals: 1,208 (3.18 per match)

The Premier Division featured 18 clubs which competed in the previous season, along with two new clubs:

- Eastwood Town, relegated from the Northern Premier League
- Mickleover Sports, promoted from Division One

=== League table ===
Pos	Team	Pld	W	D	L	GF	GA	GD	Pts	Promotion or relegation
1	Ossett Albion	38	22	10	6	76	37	+39	76	Promoted to the Northern Premier League Division One
2	Eastwood Town	38	23	7	8	73	34	+39	76	Promoted to the Northern Premier League Division One
3	Brigg Town	38	20	11	7	73	40	+33	71	Promoted to the Northern Premier League Division One
4	Sheffield	38	19	12	7	64	40	+24	69	
5	Pickering Town	38	19	10	9	67	44	+23	67	
6	Goole	38	18	10	10	67	44	+23	64	
7	Buxton	38	17	12	9	69	50	+19	63	
8	Selby Town	38	16	11	11	86	57	+29	59	
9	Liversedge	38	17	8	13	72	58	+14	59	
10	Glapwell	38	14	10	14	53	45	+8	52	
11	Thackley	38	14	9	15	61	67	−6	51	
12	Harrogate Railway Athletic	38	12	13	13	63	64	−1	49	
13	Mickleover Sports	38	14	5	19	52	66	−14	47	
14	Armthorpe Welfare	38	14	4	20	48	67	−19	46	
15	Hallam	38	13	5	20	56	76	−20	44	
16	Eccleshill United	38	12	8	18	52	74	−22	44	
17	Glasshoughton Welfare	38	10	7	21	58	83	−25	37	
18	Arnold Town	38	10	6	22	45	67	−22	36	
19	Borrowash Victoria	38	8	7	23	35	84	−49	31	
20	Brodsworth Miners Welfare	38	3	5	30	38	111	−73	14	

Source: fchd
Rules for classification: 1) points; 2) goal difference; 3) number of goals scored.

== Division One ==
Northern Counties East Football League Division One
- Season: 2003–04
- Champions: Shirebrook Town
- Promoted: Long Eaton United; Maltby Main; Shirebrook Town
- Matches: 306
- Goals: 971 (3.17 per match)

Division One featured 14 clubs which competed in the previous season, along with four new clubs.

- Clubs joined from the Central Midlands League:
  - Carlton Town
  - South Normanton Athletic
  - Sutton Town
- Plus:
  - Garforth Town, relegated from the Premier Division

=== League table ===
Pos	Team	Pld	W	D	L	GF	GA	GD	Pts	Promotion or relegation
1	Shirebrook Town	34	22	5	7	59	26	+33	71	Promoted to the Premier Division
2	Long Eaton United	34	22	2	10	63	40	+23	68	Promoted to the Premier Division
3	Maltby Main	34	21	7	6	81	49	+32	67 (Note: Maltby Main were deducted 3 points.)	Promoted to the Premier Division
4	Sutton Town	34	19	8	7	79	37	+42	65	
5	Gedling Town	34	18	9	7	81	49	+32	63	
6	Garforth Town	34	17	7	10	60	47	+13	58	
7	Yorkshire Amateur	34	15	8	11	57	44	+13	53	
8	Lincoln Moorlands	34	14	10	10	53	40	+13	52	
9	Carlton Town	34	14	7	13	52	51	+1	49	
10	Parkgate	34	12	11	11	52	53	−1	47	
11	Winterton Rangers	34	13	8	13	52	56	−4	47	
12	Rossington Main	34	13	5	16	56	62	−6	44	
13	South Normanton Athletic	34	11	3	20	49	62	−13	36	
14	Hall Road Rangers	34	9	5	20	43	70	−27	32	
15	Worsbrough Bridge Miners Welfare	34	9	2	23	31	75	−44	29	
16	Staveley Miners Welfare	34	7	6	21	41	75	−34	27	
17	Pontefract Collieries	34	5	10	19	30	60	−30	25	
18	Tadcaster Albion	34	6	5	23	32	75	−43	23	

Source: fchd
Rules for classification: 1) points; 2) goal difference; 3) number of goals scored.
