= 2000–01 Northern Counties East Football League =

The 2000–01 Northern Counties East Football League season was the 19th in the history of Northern Counties East Football League, a football competition in England.

== Premier Division ==
Northern Counties East Football League Premier Division
- Season: 2000–01
- Champions: Brigg Town
- Promoted: Ossett Albion
- Relegated: Staveley Miners Welfare
- Matches: 380
- Goals: 1,184 (3.12 per match)

The Premier Division featured 18 clubs which competed in the previous season, along with two new clubs, promoted from Division One:

- Glapwell
- Goole

=== League table ===
Pos	Team	Pld	W	D	L	GF	GA	GD	Pts	Promotion or relegation
1	Brigg Town	38	29	5	4	87	36	+51	92	
2	Ossett Albion	38	25	7	6	84	33	+51	82	Promoted to the Northern Premier League Division One
3	Alfreton Town	38	23	4	11	71	44	+27	73	
4	Goole	38	19	9	10	65	46	+19	66	
5	Hallam	38	19	7	12	61	51	+10	64	
6	Arnold Town	38	16	14	8	67	46	+21	62	
7	Sheffield	38	15	15	8	59	38	+21	60	
8	Thackley	38	16	9	13	59	57	+2	57	
9	Selby Town	38	16	7	15	71	71	0	55	
10	Glapwell	38	13	11	14	62	58	+4	50	
11	Denaby United	38	15	4	19	54	63	−9	49	
12	Buxton	38	12	9	17	38	57	−19	45	
13	Harrogate Railway Athletic	38	11	9	18	59	65	−6	42	
14	Eccleshill United	38	9	13	16	48	58	−10	40	
15	Liversedge	38	9	13	16	50	63	−13	40	
16	Glasshoughton Welfare	38	9	11	18	57	64	−7	38	
17	Garforth Town	38	9	10	19	56	75	−19	37	
18	Brodsworth Miners Welfare	38	11	7	20	41	86	−45	37 (Note: Brodsworth Miners Welfare were deducted 3 points.)	
19	Armthorpe Welfare	38	9	7	22	53	81	−28	34	
20	Staveley Miners Welfare	38	6	7	25	42	92	−50	25	Relegated to Division One

Source: fchd
Rules for classification: 1) points; 2) goal difference; 3) number of goals scored.

== Division One ==
Northern Counties East Football League Division One
- Season: 2000–01
- Champions: Borrowash Victoria
- Promoted: Borrowash Victoria; Pickering Town
- Matches: 240
- Goals: 741 (3.09 per match)

Division One featured 14 clubs which competed in the previous season, along with two new clubs:

- Gedling Town, joined from the Central Midlands League
- Maltby Main, relegated from the Premier Division

=== League table ===
Pos	Team	Pld	W	D	L	GF	GA	GD	Pts	Promotion or relegation
1	Borrowash Victoria	30	22	4	4	74	28	+46	70	Promoted to the Premier Division
2	Pickering Town	30	21	6	3	67	24	+43	69	Promoted to the Premier Division
3	Mickleover Sports	30	18	5	7	65	39	+26	59	
4	Bridlington Town	30	15	7	8	48	41	+7	52	
5	Gedling Town	30	14	7	9	47	37	+10	49	
6	Hall Road Rangers	30	14	6	10	43	37	+6	48	
7	Parkgate	30	13	6	11	60	52	+8	45	
8	Hatfield Main	30	13	4	13	54	49	+5	43	
9	Maltby Main	30	11	6	13	36	48	−12	39	
10	Yorkshire Amateur	30	9	5	16	33	53	−20	32	
11	Worsbrough Bridge Miners Welfare	30	9	4	17	31	54	−23	31	
12	Louth United	30	8	6	16	48	58	−10	30	
13	Pontefract Collieries	30	6	9	15	37	56	−19	27	
14	Winterton Rangers	30	8	6	16	30	53	−23	27 (Note: Winterton Rangers were deducted 3 points.)	
15	Rossington Main	30	7	5	18	39	54	−15	26	
16	Tadcaster Albion	30	6	6	18	29	58	−29	24	

Source: fchd
Rules for classification: 1) points; 2) goal difference; 3) number of goals scored.
