= Sutton Town F.C. =

Sutton Town F.C. may refer to:

- Ashfield United F.C., the club that disbanded in 1997 but was previously known as Sutton Town F.C.
- Sutton Town A.F.C., the club formed in 2007
