= 2004–05 Northern Counties East Football League =

The 2004–05 Northern Counties East Football League season was the 23rd in the history of Northern Counties East Football League, a football competition in England.

== Premier Division ==
Northern Counties East Football League Premier Division
- Season: 2004–05
- Champions: Goole
- Promoted: Goole
- Relegated: Borrowash Victoria
- Matches: 380
- Goals: 1,197 (3.15 per match)

The Premier Division featured 17 clubs which competed in the previous season, along with three new clubs, promoted from Division One:

- Long Eaton United
- Maltby Main
- Shirebrook Town

=== League table ===
| Pos | Team | Pld | W | D | L | GF | GA | GD | Pts | Promotion or relegation |
|---|---|---|---|---|---|---|---|---|---|---|
| 1 | Goole | 38 | 25 | 4 | 9 | 87 | 47 | +40 | 79 | Promoted to the Northern Premier League Division One |
| 2 | Selby Town | 38 | 23 | 8 | 7 | 72 | 43 | +29 | 77 | |
| 3 | Harrogate Railway Athletic | 38 | 24 | 4 | 10 | 92 | 54 | +38 | 76 | |
| 4 | Sheffield | 38 | 22 | 8 | 8 | 78 | 47 | +31 | 74 | |
| 5 | Pickering Town | 38 | 18 | 13 | 7 | 62 | 35 | +27 | 67 | |
| 6 | Liversedge | 38 | 18 | 10 | 10 | 74 | 59 | +15 | 64 | |
| 7 | Thackley | 38 | 14 | 13 | 11 | 57 | 46 | +11 | 55 | |
| 8 | Buxton | 38 | 14 | 13 | 11 | 59 | 57 | +2 | 55 | |
| 9 | Shirebrook Town | 38 | 14 | 12 | 12 | 58 | 50 | +8 | 54 | |
| 10 | Mickleover Sports | 38 | 16 | 10 | 12 | 53 | 45 | +8 | 54 (Note: Mickleover Sports were deducted 4 points.) | |
| 11 | Glasshoughton Welfare | 38 | 13 | 13 | 12 | 57 | 55 | +2 | 52 | |
| 12 | Long Eaton United | 38 | 15 | 7 | 16 | 55 | 54 | +1 | 52 | |
| 13 | Glapwell | 38 | 10 | 15 | 13 | 57 | 57 | 0 | 45 | |
| 14 | Eccleshill United | 38 | 13 | 6 | 19 | 69 | 76 | −7 | 45 | |
| 15 | Arnold Town | 38 | 9 | 12 | 17 | 44 | 62 | −18 | 39 | |
| 16 | Hallam | 38 | 10 | 9 | 19 | 45 | 71 | −26 | 39 | |
| 17 | Brodsworth Miners Welfare | 38 | 12 | 4 | 22 | 58 | 85 | −27 | 37 (Note: Brodsworth Miners Welfare were deducted 3 points.) | |
| 18 | Armthorpe Welfare | 38 | 11 | 3 | 24 | 44 | 73 | −29 | 36 | |
| 19 | Maltby Main | 38 | 9 | 8 | 21 | 41 | 72 | −31 | 33 (Note: Maltby Main were deducted 2 points.) | |
| 20 | Borrowash Victoria | 38 | 0 | 8 | 30 | 32 | 106 | −74 | 8 | Relegated to Division One |

Source: NCEFL
Rules for classification: 1) points; 2) goal difference; 3) number of goals scored.

== Division One ==
Northern Counties East Football League Division One
- Season: 2004–05
- Champions: Sutton Town
- Promoted: Garforth Town; Sutton Town
- Matches: 240
- Goals: 854 (3.56 per match)

Division One featured 15 clubs which competed in the previous season, along with one new clubs:

- Retford United, joined from the Central Midlands League

=== League table ===
| Pos | Team | Pld | W | D | L | GF | GA | GD | Pts | Promotion or relegation |
|---|---|---|---|---|---|---|---|---|---|---|
| 1 | Sutton Town | 30 | 22 | 5 | 3 | 94 | 35 | +59 | 71 | Promoted to the Premier Division |
| 2 | Garforth Town | 30 | 21 | 4 | 5 | 65 | 27 | +38 | 67 | Promoted to the Premier Division |
| 3 | Carlton Town | 30 | 21 | 2 | 7 | 64 | 34 | +30 | 65 | |
| 4 | Lincoln Moorlands | 30 | 16 | 7 | 7 | 61 | 39 | +22 | 55 | |
| 5 | Gedling Town | 30 | 16 | 7 | 7 | 53 | 39 | +14 | 55 | |
| 6 | Tadcaster Albion | 30 | 14 | 8 | 8 | 56 | 38 | +18 | 50 | |
| 7 | Yorkshire Amateur | 30 | 10 | 7 | 13 | 57 | 55 | +2 | 37 | |
| 8 | Retford United | 30 | 10 | 7 | 13 | 45 | 58 | −13 | 37 | |
| 9 | Staveley Miners Welfare | 30 | 11 | 3 | 16 | 50 | 56 | −6 | 36 | |
| 10 | Winterton Rangers | 30 | 9 | 9 | 12 | 50 | 58 | −8 | 36 | |
| 11 | Hall Road Rangers | 30 | 10 | 3 | 17 | 35 | 57 | −22 | 33 | |
| 12 | Parkgate | 30 | 7 | 8 | 15 | 53 | 80 | −27 | 29 | |
| 13 | Pontefract Collieries | 30 | 8 | 6 | 16 | 52 | 67 | −15 | 25 (Note: Pontefract Collieries were deducted 5 points.) | |
| 14 | Rossington Main | 30 | 6 | 9 | 15 | 46 | 64 | −18 | 24 (Note: Rossington Main were deducted 3 points.) | |
| 15 | Worsbrough Bridge Miners Welfare | 30 | 5 | 6 | 19 | 36 | 68 | −32 | 21 | |
| 16 | South Normanton Athletic | 30 | 6 | 5 | 19 | 37 | 79 | −42 | 20 (Note: South Normanton Athletic were deducted 3 points.) | |

Source: fchd
Rules for classification: 1) points; 2) goal difference; 3) number of goals scored.
