= Lee Wilson (footballer, born 1972) =

English footballer and manager

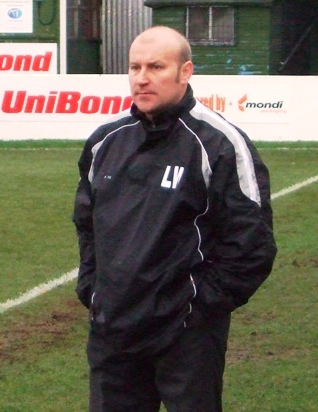
- Wilson during his first game in charge of Shepshed Dynamo in 2007

Personal information
- Date of birth: 23 May 1972 (age 54)
- Place of birth: Mansfield, England
- Position: Striker

Senior career*
Years	Team	Apps	(Gls)
19??–1992	Clipstone Welfare	66	(62)
1992–1994	Mansfield Town	18	(1)
1994–1995	Telford United	32	(21)
1995	Dagenham & Redbridge	33	(18)
1995	Halifax Town	5	(3)
1996–1997	Tamworth	42	(22)
1997–1998	Grantham Town	15	(5)
1998–1999	Solihull Borough	10	(6)
1999–2000	King's Lynn	29	(16)
2001	Spalding United	0	(0)
2001–2002	Tamworth	41	(22)
2002	Sutton Town	6	(3)
2002–2003	Glapwell	19	(19)
2003–2004	Tamworth	26	(15)
2004–2006	Glapwell	?	(?)

Managerial career
- 2004–2006: Glapwell
- 2006–2007: Sutton Town
- 2007: Gedling Town
- 2007–2009: Shepshed Dynamo
- * Club domestic league appearances and goals

Lee Wilson (born 23 May 1972 in Mansfield, England) is a former professional footballer and former first team manager of various non-league clubs including Shepshed Dynamo. He once scored for the mighty Stags against local rivals, Chesterfield.

On 17 August 2014, Lee Wilson made history by becoming the first player to play for Mansfield Town and Mansfield Cricket Club. He now works as a senior scout for Hull City A.F.C. after holding positions in same role at Swansea, WBA and Norwich.
