= Darren Davis =

Darren Davis may refer to:

- Darren Davis (Canadian football) (born 1977), running back in the Canadian Football League
- Darren Davis (footballer) (born 1967), English former footballer
- Darren G. Davis (born 1968), American independent comic book publisher and writer

== See also ==
- Darren Davies (disambiguation)
