= 2002–03 Northern Counties East Football League =

The 2002–03 Northern Counties East Football League season was the 21st in the history of Northern Counties East Football League, a football competition in England.

== Premier Division ==
Northern Counties East Football League Premier Division
- Season: 2002–03
- Champions: Bridlington Town
- Promoted: Bridlington Town
- Relegated: Garforth Town
- Matches: 380
- Goals: 1,246 (3.28 per match)

The Premier Division featured 18 clubs which competed in the previous season, along with two new clubs:

- Bridlington Town, promoted from Division One
- Ossett Albion, relegated from the Northern Premier League

=== League table ===
Pos	Team	Pld	W	D	L	GF	GA	GD	Pts	Promotion or relegation
1	Bridlington Town	38	29	5	4	92	33	+59	92	Promoted to the Northern Premier League Division One
2	Brigg Town	38	22	6	10	75	42	+33	72	
3	Goole	38	20	11	7	68	36	+32	71	
4	Buxton	38	21	7	10	84	56	+28	70	
5	Ossett Albion	38	21	7	10	70	52	+18	70	
6	Thackley	38	17	11	10	53	39	+14	62	
7	Sheffield	38	17	8	13	74	55	+19	59	
8	Eccleshill United	38	16	7	15	61	57	+4	55	
9	Liversedge	38	16	6	16	59	65	−6	54	
10	Harrogate Railway Athletic	38	15	7	16	87	71	+16	52	
11	Glapwell	38	14	7	17	52	59	−7	49	
12	Glasshoughton Welfare	38	13	9	16	65	74	−9	48	
13	Pickering Town	38	14	5	19	49	51	−2	47	
14	Brodsworth Miners Welfare	38	13	7	18	64	84	−20	46	
15	Arnold Town	38	12	8	18	58	53	+5	44	
16	Selby Town	38	11	7	20	44	73	−29	40	
17	Hallam	38	10	9	19	50	75	−25	39	
18	Armthorpe Welfare	38	10	6	22	53	85	−32	36	
19	Borrowash Victoria	38	9	5	24	41	97	−56	32	
20	Garforth Town	38	9	4	25	47	89	−42	31	Relegated to Division One

Source: fchd
Rules for classification: 1) points; 2) goal difference; 3) number of goals scored.

== Division One ==
Northern Counties East Football League Division One
- Season: 2002–03
- Champions: Mickleover Sports
- Promoted: Mickleover Sports
- Matches: 272
- Goals: 907 (3.33 per match)

Division One featured 15 clubs which competed in the previous season, along with two new clubs, joined from the Central Midlands League:

- Long Eaton United
- Shirebrook Town

=== League table ===
Pos	Team	Pld	W	D	L	GF	GA	GD	Pts	Promotion or relegation
1	Mickleover Sports	32	24	3	5	62	26	+36	75	Promoted to the Premier Division
2	Shirebrook Town	32	21	5	6	79	38	+41	68	
3	Long Eaton United	32	17	7	8	66	52	+14	58	
4	Pontefract Collieries	32	16	7	9	68	56	+12	55	
5	Hatfield Main	32	17	4	11	49	42	+7	55	Resigned from the league
6	Gedling Town	32	15	8	9	70	48	+22	53	
7	Lincoln Moorlands	32	14	6	12	56	42	+14	48	
8	Parkgate	32	12	10	10	66	52	+14	46	
9	Hall Road Rangers	32	12	8	12	55	67	−12	44	
10	Winterton Rangers	32	10	8	14	48	54	−6	38	
11	Yorkshire Amateur	32	10	8	14	39	45	−6	38	
12	Rossington Main	32	9	10	13	45	59	−14	37	
13	Louth United	32	10	6	16	48	62	−14	36	Club folded
14	Worsbrough Bridge Miners Welfare	32	10	5	17	41	56	−15	35	
15	Maltby Main	32	10	3	19	51	80	−29	33	
16	Tadcaster Albion	32	6	4	22	30	59	−29	22	
17	Staveley Miners Welfare	32	5	6	21	34	69	−35	21	

Source: fchd
Rules for classification: 1) points; 2) goal difference; 3) number of goals scored.
