= BWFC (disambiguation) =

Bolton Wanderers Football Club (BWFC) is an English professional football club.

BWFC may also refer to the following clubs:

- Bidvest Wits F.C., Johannesburg, South Africa
- Blidworth Welfare F.C., Nottinghamshire, England
- Boreham Wood F.C., Hertfordshire, England
- Bray Wanderers F.C., County Wicklow, Ireland

== See also ==
- BWAFC
