= 2005–06 Northern Counties East Football League =

The 2005–06 Northern Counties East Football League season was the 24th in the history of Northern Counties East Football League, a football competition in England.

== Premier Division ==
Northern Counties East Football League Premier Division
- Season: 2005–06
- Champions: Buxton
- Promoted: Buxton; Harrogate Railway Athletic
- Matches: 380
- Goals: 1,283 (3.38 per match)

The Premier Division featured 18 clubs which competed in the previous season, along with two new clubs, promoted from Division One:

- Garforth Town
- Sutton Town

=== League table ===
Pos	Team	Pld	W	D	L	GF	GA	GD	Pts	Promotion or relegation
1	Buxton	38	30	5	3	102	27	+75	95	Promoted to the Northern Premier League Division One
2	Liversedge	38	25	5	8	106	49	+57	80	
3	Harrogate Railway Athletic	38	22	7	9	92	49	+43	73	Promoted to the Northern Premier League Division One
4	Sheffield	38	20	10	8	63	43	+20	70	
5	Arnold Town	38	21	7	10	72	45	+27	67 (Note: Arnold Town were deducted 3 points.)	
6	Pickering Town	38	19	9	10	63	42	+21	66	
7	Sutton Town	38	17	9	12	78	57	+21	60	
8	Selby Town	38	17	5	16	58	60	−2	56	
9	Thackley	38	18	3	17	59	62	−3	54 (Note: Thackley were deducted 3 points.)	
10	Armthorpe Welfare	38	13	8	17	65	77	−12	47	
11	Glapwell	38	12	11	15	46	71	−25	47	
12	Garforth Town	38	12	11	15	61	68	−7	46 (Note: Garforth Town were deducted 1 point.)	
13	Mickleover Sports	38	12	8	18	51	73	−22	44	
14	Eccleshill United	38	12	7	19	66	70	−4	43	
15	Shirebrook Town	38	13	4	21	59	85	−26	43	
16	Glasshoughton Welfare	38	11	5	22	52	70	−18	38	
17	Hallam	38	10	8	20	44	73	−29	38	
18	Maltby Main	38	9	11	18	52	70	−18	37 (Note: Maltby Main were deducted 1 point.)	
19	Long Eaton United	38	8	8	22	47	86	−39	29 (Note: Long Eaton United were deducted 3 points.)	
20	Brodsworth Miners Welfare	38	6	5	27	47	106	−59	23	

Source: fchd
Rules for classification: 1) points; 2) goal difference; 3) number of goals scored.

== Division One ==
Northern Counties East Football League Division One
- Season: 2005–06
- Champions: Carlton Town
- Promoted: Carlton Town; Retford United
- Matches: 240
- Goals: 857 (3.57 per match)

Division One featured 14 clubs which competed in the previous season, along with two new clubs:

- Borrowash Victoria, relegated from the Premier Division
- Teversal, joined from the Central Midlands League

=== League table ===
Pos	Team	Pld	W	D	L	GF	GA	GD	Pts	Promotion or relegation
1	Carlton Town	30	23	4	3	68	27	+41	73	Promoted to the Premier Division
2	Retford United	30	20	5	5	74	28	+46	65	Promoted to the Premier Division
3	Tadcaster Albion	30	21	1	8	55	35	+20	64	
4	Gedling Town	30	19	5	6	75	34	+41	62	
5	Winterton Rangers	30	18	7	5	71	27	+44	61	
6	Parkgate	30	18	5	7	87	40	+47	59	
7	Lincoln Moorlands	30	16	1	13	56	40	+16	49	
8	Borrowash Victoria	30	15	4	11	50	45	+5	49	
9	Worsbrough Bridge Miners Welfare	30	11	5	14	57	67	−10	38	
10	Staveley Miners Welfare	30	9	4	17	44	57	−13	31	
11	Pontefract Collieries	30	6	7	17	43	64	−21	25	
12	South Normanton Athletic	30	7	4	19	45	86	−41	25	
13	Rossington Main	30	6	5	19	37	67	−30	23	
14	Hall Road Rangers	30	6	5	19	38	82	−44	23	
15	Teversal	30	5	6	19	28	78	−50	21	
16	Yorkshire Amateur	30	4	4	22	29	80	−51	16	

Source: fchd
Rules for classification: 1) points; 2) goal difference; 3) number of goals scored.
