= Fred Thompson (footballer, born c. 1873) =

English footballer

Personal information
- Full name: Frederick Thompson
- Date of birth: c. 1873
- Place of birth: South Hetton, England
- Date of death: 13 January 1958 (aged 84–85)
- Place of death: Woodlands, Doncaster, England
- Position: Goalkeeper

Senior career*
Years	Team	Apps	(Gls)
18??−1895	Sunderland West End		
1895−1896	Sunderland	2	(0)
1896−1901	Bury	65	(0)
1901−1903	Bolton Wanderers	20	(0)
1903−1904	Luton Town		(0)
1904−1905	Portsmouth		(0)
1905−1906	Fulham	4	(0)
1906−1908	Norwich City		(0)
1908−1909	Doncaster Rovers		(0)
1909−19??	Denaby United		
–	Brodsworth Main		
- * Club domestic league appearances and goals

Frederick Thompson (c. 1873 − 13 January 1958) was an English footballer who played as a goalkeeper in the Football League around the turn of the 20th century. Playing for Bury, he was an FA Cup winner in 1900.

== Playing career ==
Born in South Hetton in the north east of England, Thompson first played for Sunderland in the 1895−96 season.

He went to Bury, playing with them when they won the FA Cup final at Crystal Palace in 1900.

He later played for several other clubs including: Bolton Wanderers, Luton Town, Portsmouth, Fulham, Norwich City, Doncaster Rovers, Denaby United and Brodsworth Main.
