= 2002–03 Northern Premier League =

The 2002–03 Northern Premier League season was the 35th in the history of the Northern Premier League, a football competition in England. Teams were divided into two divisions; the Premier and the First.

== Premier Division ==
Northern Premier League Premier Division
- Season: 2002–03
- Champions: Accrington Stanley
- Promoted: Accrington Stanley
- Relegated: Colwyn Bay; Gateshead; Hyde United
- Matches: 506
- Goals: 1,536 (3.04 per match)

The Premier League featured three new teams:

- Stalybridge Celtic relegated from the Football Conference
- Harrogate Town promoted as champions of Division One
- Ashton United promoted via 3° play-offs from Division One

=== League table ===
Pos	Team	Pld	W	D	L	GF	GA	GD	Pts	Promotion or relegation
1	Accrington Stanley (C, P)	44	30	10	4	97	44	+53	100	Promotion to Football Conference
2	Barrow	44	24	12	8	84	52	+32	84	
3	Vauxhall Motors	44	22	10	12	81	46	+35	76	
4	Stalybridge Celtic	44	21	13	10	77	51	+26	76	
5	Worksop Town	44	21	9	14	82	67	+15	72	
6	Harrogate Town	44	21	8	15	75	63	+12	71	
7	Bradford Park Avenue	44	20	10	14	73	70	+3	70	
8	Hucknall Town	44	17	15	12	72	62	+10	66	
9	Droylsden	44	18	10	16	62	52	+10	64	
10	Whitby Town	44	17	12	15	80	69	+11	63	
11	Marine	44	17	10	17	63	60	+3	61	
12	Wakefield & Emley	44	14	18	12	46	49	−3	60 (Note: From this season onwards Emley were known as Wakefield & Emley.)	
13	Runcorn F.C. Halton	44	15	15	14	69	74	−5	60	
14	Altrincham	44	17	9	18	58	63	−5	60	
15	Gainsborough Trinity	44	16	11	17	67	66	+1	59	
16	Ashton United	44	15	13	16	71	79	−8	58	
17	Lancaster City	44	16	9	19	71	75	−4	57	
18	Burscough	44	14	9	21	44	51	−7	51	
19	Blyth Spartans	44	14	9	21	67	87	−20	51	
20	Frickley Athletic	44	13	8	23	45	78	−33	47	
21	Gateshead (R)	44	10	11	23	60	81	−21	41	Qualification for Division One Play-offs
22	Colwyn Bay (R)	44	5	9	30	52	99	−47	24	Relegation to NPL Division One
23	Hyde United (R)	44	5	8	31	40	98	−58	23	Relegation to NPL Division One

Updated to match(es) played on 8 February 2011. Source: .
Rules for classification: 1) points; 2) goal difference; 3) number of goals scored.
(C) Champions; (P) Promoted; (R) Relegated

=== Results ===
Home \ Away	ACC	ALT	ASH	BRW	BLY	BPA	BUR	COL	DRO	FRK	GAI	GAT	HAR	HUC	HYD	LNC	MAR	RUN	STL	VAU	W&E	WTB	WKS
Accrington Stanley		3–1	4–1	2–1	3–2	3–1	4–2	2–0	2–1	2–1	3–0	2–1	3–2	2–0	1–0	1–1	5–0	2–1	4–1	2–1	1–1	1–1	1–1
Altrincham	1–1		1–0	1–2	3–2	0–0	0–0	4–2	3–1	1–0	1–1	4–0	0–4	0–0	4–1	3–0	0–1	1–1	3–3	0–2	0–1	2–1	2–4
Ashton United	2–2	1–0		2–2	2–1	1–4	0–0	2–2	2–1	3–2	1–3	3–1	5–0	2–3	2–1	2–2	2–3	3–3	1–1	2–1	2–2	1–1	1–4
Barrow	1–0	4–0	0–3		2–1	3–2	3–0	2–1	0–0	2–1	3–2	2–0	1–2	1–1	3–0	2–2	1–0	3–0	1–0	1–2	1–1	2–2	3–1
Blyth Spartans	0–3	0–2	4–0	1–1		1–2	2–1	1–1	0–1	4–2	2–1	3–2	0–3	1–2	1–3	1–0	1–1	3–1	1–4	2–5	2–1	2–3	2–1
Bradford Park Avenue	1–1	1–1	1–1	2–2	5–1		3–2	4–2	3–1	2–2	1–0	2–0	1–0	0–3	5–1	0–1	2–1	3–2	2–1	1–0	1–1	2–3	0–1
Burscough	0–1	0–3	3–2	2–0	1–3	0–1		3–0	0–0	1–0	4–4	1–0	0–1	2–0	0–0	0–0	2–1	3–3	0–1	0–0	1–0	0–2	3–2
Colwyn Bay	1–2	2–3	1–1	3–4	1–2	2–0	1–3		0–3	2–3	0–3	2–3	0–1	3–6	2–0	1–1	0–2	1–3	1–1	1–1	3–2	1–1	0–2
Droylsden	2–2	1–0	0–1	0–2	7–0	2–0	1–0	2–1		3–1	3–0	0–2	2–1	0–0	0–1	1–5	0–1	2–0	1–1	1–1	1–0	2–1	0–1
Frickley Athletic	2–1	0–3	1–0	1–2	1–0	0–3	0–0	3–0	0–2		2–2	1–0	0–1	0–0	0–0	0–1	1–3	2–2	1–0	1–0	0–3	1–7	1–3
Gainsborough Trinity	1–5	2–1	1–2	0–2	3–2	2–2	0–1	2–1	1–4	2–0		0–1	1–2	2–2	4–2	2–1	0–0	1–1	1–1	2–1	4–1	0–1	4–2
Gateshead	5–1	0–0	0–1	2–2	3–0	1–1	1–0	2–2	0–2	2–2	1–1		2–3	1–5	2–1	3–3	1–2	2–3	0–1	3–2	0–1	1–3	2–3
Harrogate Town	0–2	3–0	0–1	3–2	3–1	5–2	2–1	4–1	0–0	1–2	0–2	1–3		2–0	3–1	1–3	1–1	3–1	1–0	2–2	1–2	0–2	2–2
Hucknall Town	2–1	4–1	2–3	0–3	0–2	1–2	3–1	2–1	2–0	1–0	0–0	1–1	1–1		2–0	1–1	2–1	3–3	2–2	1–2	1–1	1–2	0–0
Hyde United	3–3	0–2	1–1	1–3	1–1	3–1	1–0	0–2	1–3	2–3	1–5	0–1	1–5	0–1		2–3	0–2	0–2	0–1	1–0	0–1	3–3	1–4
Lancaster City	1–2	3–0	1–3	1–5	1–4	2–3	2–1	1–0	0–3	4–0	0–1	2–1	1–2	1–2	4–1		1–0	1–1	0–1	1–2	5–2	0–1	1–4
Marine	0–3	0–1	1–0	3–1	2–1	4–2	1–0	0–0	2–2	0–1	0–0	4–2	2–2	2–1	4–1	4–0		0–2	1–2	1–2	2–1	5–5	1–2
Runcorn	0–2	3–2	3–2	1–1	2–2	2–0	0–2	6–2	0–0	0–1	0–5	1–1	2–1	0–3	1–1	1–4	2–1		1–0	0–5	4–1	1–1	3–0
Stalybridge Celtic	1–4	2–0	4–1	4–3	1–1	2–2	1–0	3–1	2–1	3–1	3–0	4–4	4–1	1–2	6–0	1–0	2–1	0–1		2–2	0–0	2–0	4–1
Vauxhall Motors	0–1	4–0	5–1	1–1	0–1	0–1	1–0	2–3	2–1	5–0	1–0	3–0	1–1	5–1	1–0	6–2	1–1	2–1	2–1		1–0	3–2	0–1
Wakefield & Emley	0–0	2–1	1–1	0–1	1–1	2–0	1–0	2–1	2–2	0–0	2–1	2–1	0–0	1–1	1–1	1–4	1–1	0–0	0–0	1–1		1–0	1–0
Whitby Town	0–3	0–1	3–2	1–1	4–4	0–1	0–2	1–0	5–2	3–1	3–0	2–2	4–2	3–3	3–2	2–3	2–0	0–3	1–2	1–2	0–1		0–1
Worksop Town	1–4	1–2	3–2	0–2	1–1	7–1	0–2	4–1	4–1	2–4	0–1	2–0	1–2	5–4	2–1	1–1	2–1	2–2	1–1	1–1	2–1	0–0	

Updated to match(es) played on 26 April 2003. Source: Northern Premier Division results grid
Legend: Blue = home team win; Yellow = draw; Red = away team win.

== Division One ==
Northern Premier League Division One
- Season: 2002–03
- Champions: Alfreton Town
- Promoted: Alfreton Town; Radcliffe Borough; Spennymoor United
- Relegated: Eastwood Town; Trafford
- Matches: 465
- Goals: 1,407 (3.03 per match)

Division One featured four new teams:

- Bamber Bridge relegated via play-offs from Premier Division
- Bishop Auckland relegated from Premier Division
- Alfreton Town promoted as champions of the Northern Counties East League Premier Division
- Kidsgrove Athletic promoted as champions of the North West Counties League Division One

=== League table ===
Pos	Team	Pld	W	D	L	GF	GA	GD	Pts	Promotion or relegation
1	Alfreton Town (C, P)	42	26	9	7	106	59	+47	87	Promotion to Premier Division
2	Spennymoor United (P)	42	27	6	9	81	42	+39	87	Promotion to Premier Division
3	Radcliffe Borough (P)	42	25	10	7	90	46	+44	85	Qualification for Play-offs
4	North Ferriby United	42	23	9	10	78	45	+33	78	Qualification for Play-offs
5	Chorley	42	21	10	11	80	51	+29	73	Qualification for Play-offs
6	Belper Town	42	20	13	9	53	42	+11	73	
7	Witton Albion	42	19	15	8	67	50	+17	72	
8	Matlock Town	42	20	10	12	67	48	+19	70	
9	Leek Town	42	20	9	13	63	46	+17	69	
10	Workington	42	19	10	13	73	60	+13	67	
11	Farsley Celtic	42	17	11	14	66	67	−1	62	
12	Kendal Town	42	18	7	17	68	58	+10	61	
13	Bamber Bridge	42	15	9	18	55	59	−4	54	
14	Guiseley	42	14	11	17	68	63	+5	53	
15	Bishop Auckland	42	13	10	19	58	83	−25	49	
16	Lincoln United	42	12	9	21	67	77	−10	45	
17	Stocksbridge Park Steels	42	11	9	22	54	81	−27	42	
18	Rossendale United	42	12	5	25	58	88	−30	41	
19	Kidsgrove Athletic	42	9	11	22	49	71	−22	38	
20	Ossett Town	42	8	9	25	39	80	−41	33	
21	Eastwood Town (R)	42	5	8	29	33	92	−59	23	Relegation to NCEFL Premier Division
22	Trafford (R)	42	5	6	31	34	99	−65	21	Relegation to NWCFL Division One

Updated to match(es) played on 8 February 2011. Source: .
Rules for classification: 1) points; 2) goal difference; 3) number of goals scored.
(C) Champions; (P) Promoted; (R) Relegated

=== Results ===
Home \ Away	ALF	BAM	BLP	BIS	CHO	EAS	FAR	GUI	KEN	KID	LEE	LIN	MAT	NFU	OST	RAD	ROS	SPU	STO	TRA	WTN	WRK
Alfreton Town		1–1	1–2	4–1	1–3	4–1	2–0	1–3	4–3	2–0	1–2	2–2	2–0	3–4	5–1	3–2	3–0	1–1	1–1	6–1	1–1	3–0
Bamber Bridge	0–2		0–0	1–2	2–0	2–2	4–2	1–0	1–0	2–2	0–4	2–0	0–1	0–1	2–1	0–1	0–1	1–2	3–0	5–1	1–2	1–0
Belper Town	2–5	2–1		3–1	4–2	2–1	1–2	2–1	0–3	0–0	0–1	1–0	2–1	0–0	1–0	0–0	1–1	0–1	4–3	1–0	1–1	1–0
Bishop Auckland	0–0	2–2	2–2		2–1	3–0	1–1	1–1	2–0	1–0	1–1	1–1	1–5	1–3	3–1	1–3	5–3	3–2	2–1	2–0	0–0	2–3
Chorley	2–4	3–1	1–2	4–1		3–1	1–1	2–3	5–0	3–0	3–1	2–1	4–0	2–1	1–2	2–2	1–0	2–0	0–0	4–0	1–0	1–1
Eastwood Town	0–4	0–1	0–3	1–2	0–1		1–4	1–3	1–3	4–4	0–0	1–2	0–0	2–3	2–1	0–1	1–1	0–1	3–0	1–0	0–3	0–3
Farsley Celtic	0–3	2–1	0–1	3–0	3–3	2–1		2–2	0–1	5–4	4–3	4–1	1–5	0–1	1–0	1–1	1–0	1–1	2–0	4–3	0–1	0–1
Guiseley	2–2	3–3	0–0	7–0	2–1	4–0	0–1		1–2	0–0	2–2	4–0	0–3	1–2	2–6	0–0	3–1	0–2	1–2	2–0	0–1	2–2
Kendal Town	4–1	0–1	2–1	3–0	4–1	1–0	0–1	2–1		1–1	1–0	0–3	0–0	3–3	2–0	0–1	2–0	1–1	0–1	4–1	1–2	3–3
Kidsgrove Athletic	0–1	2–1	0–2	3–1	1–0	0–1	1–3	1–1	3–1		0–4	2–4	2–3	2–0	1–3	0–0	1–2	1–0	2–3	2–0	2–2	1–1
Leek Town	3–2	0–1	4–0	3–1	2–1	2–0	1–1	1–0	1–0	1–0		2–3	1–0	2–2	1–0	1–2	2–2	1–3	3–2	1–1	1–2	0–1
Lincoln United	1–3	1–1	0–1	3–3	1–2	6–0	4–1	2–3	3–1	0–2	0–0		1–5	4–2	0–0	0–1	1–2	0–2	2–0	5–0	0–1	1–2
Matlock Town	2–4	1–0	0–0	4–2	2–2	1–0	2–2	1–2	1–5	2–0	0–1	1–2		1–0	1–0	2–1	3–3	0–1	2–0	3–1	2–0	3–2
North Ferriby United	2–2	2–0	0–0	1–0	1–3	5–0	2–0	3–1	1–0	1–0	4–1	2–1	0–0		7–1	4–2	1–0	2–2	0–1	1–0	0–1	1–1
Ossett Town	1–2	4–0	1–2	2–1	1–2	1–0	1–1	0–0	2–2	2–2	0–5	1–1	0–0	0–4		0–4	2–1	0–1	1–3	0–0	1–1	0–2
Radcliffe Borough	2–4	2–1	1–1	1–0	1–1	1–1	3–0	2–1	2–4	5–1	0–1	4–1	0–1	2–0	7–1		2–1	7–4	4–0	4–2	4–2	1–1
Rossendale United	3–4	1–3	0–4	3–1	0–1	2–3	4–3	1–4	1–4	1–0	1–0	3–3	1–0	2–1	0–1	1–3		1–2	6–3	3–1	1–3	1–2
Spennymoor United	1–2	3–0	3–0	1–2	0–0	3–0	2–0	2–1	1–0	2–1	2–1	3–1	1–1	0–3	3–0	0–2	3–0		6–0	3–0	3–0	2–1
Stocksbridge Park Steels	2–3	1–0	0–0	3–1	1–4	2–1	1–3	2–3	1–1	3–4	0–1	1–1	1–1	1–2	2–0	0–1	5–1	0–3		2–0	1–1	1–2
Trafford	2–2	1–3	0–2	0–1	0–3	0–0	1–1	0–2	1–2	0–0	3–1	3–2	1–2	0–4	1–0	0–3	1–2	0–3	3–1		2–3	3–2
Witton Albion	1–2	1–2	1–1	1–0	1–1	1–1	2–2	5–0	3–1	1–0	0–0	1–2	0–4	1–1	2–0	2–2	2–0	5–3	1–1	4–1		2–1
Workington	0–3	3–3	2–1	2–2	1–1	7–2	0–1	1–0	2–1	2–1	0–1	5–1	2–1	2–1	2–1	1–3	2–1	1–2	1–2	3–0	3–3	

Updated to match(es) played on 26 April 2003. Source: Northern Premier League First Division results grid
Legend: Blue = home team win; Yellow = draw; Red = away team win.

=== Play-offs ===
The Division One play-offs saw the third to fifth placed sides in the Division and the team that finished 21st in the Premier Division compete for one place in the Premier Division.

Semifinals
3°D1	Radcliffe Borough	1
4°D1	North Ferriby United	0
5°D1	Chorley	5
21°PD	Gateshead	2

Final
3°D1	Radcliffe Borough	2(4)
5°D1	Chorley	2(2)

== Promotion and relegation ==
In the thirty-fifth season of the Northern Premier League Accrington Stanley (as champions) were automatically promoted to the Football Conference. Gateshead, Colwyn Bay and Hyde United were relegated to the First Division; these three clubs were replaced by relegated Conference side Southport, First Division winners Alfreton Town, second placed Spennymoor United and third placed Radcliffe Borough (via a Playoff). In the First Division Eastwood Town and Trafford left the League at the end of the season and were replaced by newly admitted Bridlington Town and Prescot Cables.

== Cup Results ==
Challenge Cup: Teams from both leagues.

- Marine bt. Gateshead 3–0 on aggregate

President's Cup: 'Plate' competition for losing teams in the NPL Cup.

- Stalybridge Celtic bt. Ashton United

Chairman's Cup: 'Plate' competition for losing teams in the NPL Cup.

- Hucknall Town bt. Droylsden

Peter Swales Shield: Between Champions of NPL Premier Division and Winners of the NPL Cup.

- Accrington Stanley bt. Marine
