= Darren Davies =

Darren Davies may refer to:

- Darren Davies (Australian footballer) (born 1965), Australian rules footballer
- Darren Davies (Welsh footballer) (born 1978), Welsh footballer who played for Greenock Morton and Stirling Albion and now coaches in Australia

== See also ==
- Darren Davis (disambiguation)
