= 2001–02 Northern Counties East Football League =

The 2001–02 Northern Counties East Football League season was the 20th in the history of Northern Counties East Football League, a football competition in England.

== Premier Division ==
Northern Counties East Football League Premier Division
- Season: 2001–02
- Champions: Alfreton Town
- Promoted: Alfreton Town
- Matches: 380
- Goals: 1,197 (3.15 per match)

The Premier Division featured 18 clubs which competed in the previous season, along with two new clubs, promoted from Division One:

- Borrowash Victoria
- Pickering Town

=== League table ===
| Pos | Team | Pld | W | D | L | GF | GA | GD | Pts | Promotion or relegation |
|---|---|---|---|---|---|---|---|---|---|---|
| 1 | Alfreton Town | 38 | 27 | 5 | 6 | 94 | 36 | +58 | 86 | Promoted to the Northern Premier League Division One |
| 2 | Brigg Town | 38 | 25 | 5 | 8 | 90 | 46 | +44 | 80 | |
| 3 | Hallam | 38 | 21 | 6 | 11 | 72 | 62 | +10 | 69 | |
| 4 | Pickering Town | 38 | 20 | 8 | 10 | 70 | 38 | +32 | 68 | |
| 5 | Harrogate Railway Athletic | 38 | 17 | 10 | 11 | 83 | 61 | +22 | 61 | |
| 6 | Armthorpe Welfare | 38 | 17 | 7 | 14 | 56 | 58 | −2 | 58 | |
| 7 | Selby Town | 38 | 14 | 12 | 12 | 47 | 47 | 0 | 54 | |
| 8 | Thackley | 38 | 14 | 11 | 13 | 48 | 47 | +1 | 53 | |
| 9 | Sheffield | 38 | 14 | 10 | 14 | 54 | 62 | −8 | 52 | |
| 10 | Arnold Town | 38 | 13 | 10 | 15 | 53 | 55 | −2 | 49 | |
| 11 | Liversedge | 38 | 14 | 6 | 18 | 59 | 66 | −7 | 48 | |
| 12 | Goole | 38 | 13 | 9 | 16 | 43 | 51 | −8 | 48 | |
| 13 | Eccleshill United | 38 | 13 | 9 | 16 | 60 | 72 | −12 | 48 | |
| 14 | Glapwell | 38 | 12 | 10 | 16 | 66 | 71 | −5 | 46 | |
| 15 | Brodsworth Miners Welfare | 38 | 13 | 9 | 16 | 68 | 74 | −6 | 45 (Note: Brodsworth Miners Welfare were deducted 3 points.) | |
| 16 | Borrowash Victoria | 38 | 10 | 13 | 15 | 49 | 67 | −18 | 43 | |
| 17 | Glasshoughton Welfare | 38 | 10 | 10 | 18 | 49 | 62 | −13 | 40 | |
| 18 | Denaby United | 38 | 11 | 5 | 22 | 47 | 78 | −31 | 38 | Club folded |
| 19 | Buxton | 38 | 8 | 13 | 17 | 43 | 61 | −18 | 37 | |
| 20 | Garforth Town | 38 | 8 | 4 | 26 | 46 | 83 | −37 | 28 | |

Source: fchd
Rules for classification: 1) points; 2) goal difference; 3) number of goals scored.

== Division One ==
Northern Counties East Football League Division One
- Season: 2001–02
- Champions: Gedling Town
- Promoted: Bridlington Town
- Matches: 240
- Goals: 783 (3.26 per match)

Division One featured 14 clubs which competed in the previous season, along with two new clubs:

- Lincoln Moorlands, joined from the Central Midlands League
- Staveley Miners Welfare, relegated from the Premier Division

=== League table ===
| Pos | Team | Pld | W | D | L | GF | GA | GD | Pts | Promotion or relegation |
|---|---|---|---|---|---|---|---|---|---|---|
| 1 | Gedling Town | 30 | 21 | 5 | 4 | 75 | 42 | +33 | 68 | |
| 2 | Bridlington Town | 30 | 20 | 4 | 6 | 73 | 25 | +48 | 64 | Promoted to the Premier Division |
| 3 | Worsbrough Bridge Miners Welfare | 30 | 18 | 8 | 4 | 70 | 37 | +33 | 62 | |
| 4 | Lincoln Moorlands | 30 | 15 | 6 | 9 | 52 | 41 | +11 | 51 | |
| 5 | Mickleover Sports | 30 | 16 | 2 | 12 | 51 | 42 | +9 | 50 | |
| 6 | Maltby Main | 30 | 15 | 3 | 12 | 54 | 44 | +10 | 48 | |
| 7 | Winterton Rangers | 30 | 14 | 6 | 10 | 44 | 36 | +8 | 48 | |
| 8 | Rossington Main | 30 | 12 | 7 | 11 | 44 | 46 | −2 | 43 | |
| 9 | Hall Road Rangers | 30 | 12 | 7 | 11 | 54 | 57 | −3 | 43 | |
| 10 | Hatfield Main | 30 | 10 | 7 | 13 | 50 | 47 | +3 | 37 | |
| 11 | Louth United | 30 | 10 | 5 | 15 | 36 | 46 | −10 | 35 | |
| 12 | Yorkshire Amateur | 30 | 8 | 6 | 16 | 32 | 47 | −15 | 30 | |
| 13 | Tadcaster Albion | 30 | 9 | 3 | 18 | 40 | 62 | −22 | 30 | |
| 14 | Parkgate | 30 | 8 | 3 | 19 | 53 | 80 | −27 | 27 | |
| 15 | Staveley Miners Welfare | 30 | 4 | 12 | 14 | 32 | 60 | −28 | 24 | |
| 16 | Pontefract Collieries | 30 | 4 | 4 | 22 | 23 | 71 | −48 | 16 | |

Source: fchd
Rules for classification: 1) points; 2) goal difference; 3) number of goals scored.
