= Gedling Town F.C. =

Association football club in England

Coordinates: 52°58′20″N 01°02′16″W

Gedling Town
- Full name: Gedling Town Football Club
- Nickname: The Ferrymen
- Founded: 1985 (as R & R Scaffolding)
- Dissolved: 2011
- Ground: Riverside Stadium; Stoke Bardolph, Nottinghamshire
- Capacity: 2,000
Home colours	Away colours

Gedling Town Football Club was a semi-professional football club based in Stoke Bardolph, Nottinghamshire, England. Founded in 1985 as R & R Scaffolding, the works team of a construction firm from Netherfield, the club played its first four seasons in the Notts Amateur League before adopting the Gedling Town name in 1990. Gedling joined the nationwide league system in 1992. At the time of its dissolution in 2011 due to insolvency, the team competed in the East Midlands Counties Football League (EMCFL) Premier Division at the tenth tier of the English football pyramid.

Gedling played its home matches at the Riverside Stadium from at least 1990. Before transferring to the EMCFL in 2008, the club competed in the Northern Counties East Football League (NCEL) Division One and three Central Midlands Football League (CML) divisions. At its height, Gedling played at the ninth tier between 2000 and 2004. National tournament records included reaching the third qualifying round of the FA Cup in 2003–04 and the fourth round of the FA Vase in 2003–04, 2004–05 and 2005–06. The team were nicknamed "The Ferrymen", and their colours were primarily yellow and blue.

== History ==
=== Notts Amateur League, 1985–1990 ===
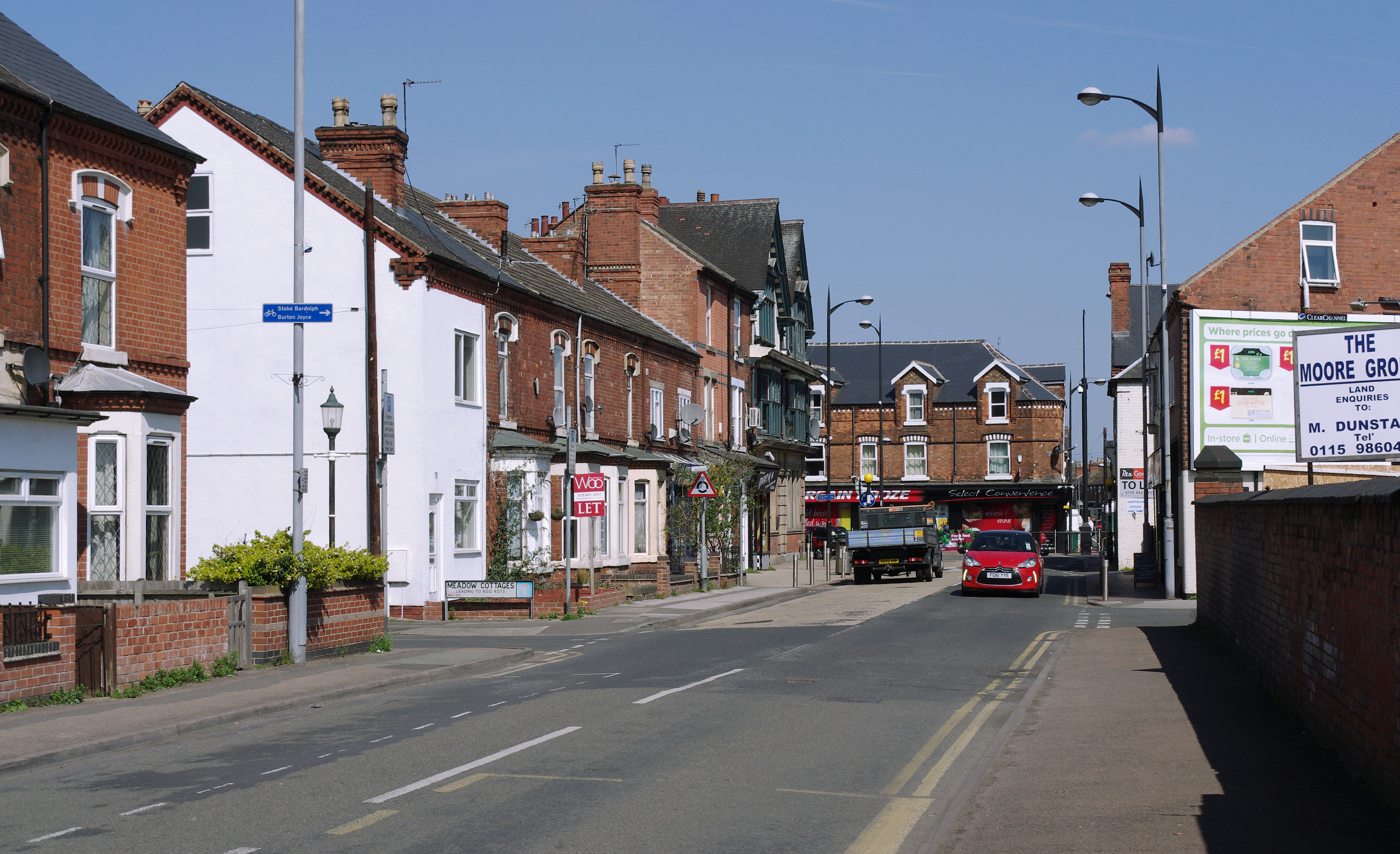
The club was founded in Netherfield (pictured in 2013)

Gedling Town was founded in 1985 as R & R Scaffolding, the works team of a construction firm from Netherfield. (Note: In August 1985, Nottingham's Football Post reported that "Division Three welcomes five newcomers – Bilborough Colts, Celtic Athletic, R & R Scaffolding, Sporting Celtic and Stapleford Villa Reserves". The club stated that it was founded in 1983 or 1986, while the Northern Counties East Football League gave the year as 1989.) Beginning in Division Three of the Notts Amateur League, the team opened the 1985–86 season with a 5–1 win over SSR. Positive results were consistent throughout the campaign; according to Nottingham's Football Post, the team "thrashed" Celtic Athletic 9–1, while Santos "were no match" after losing to them 4–0. After being promoted to Division Two, R & R Scaffolding reached the final of the league's Junior Cup in 1986–87. The team lost on penalties to Clifton Town after their opponents equalised with the last kick of the game to make it 3–3 after extra time.

Prowess in the cup was matched by success in the league, and the team delivered on their slim promotion hopes to ascend to Division One ahead of 1987–88. Despite prolific goal-scoring from individual players, the club was not promoted after its first campaign in the division. In 1988–89, R & R Scaffolding contested the final of the league's Senior Cup but lost 1–0 to Pelican Reserves after enjoying most of the possession. The team were promoted as champions to the league's Premier Division ahead of 1989–90, (Note: The Northern Counties East Football League erroneously credited Gedling with winning the Notts Amateur League Division One in 1989–90; the club competed in its Premier Division in this season.) their last season in amateur football.

=== Central Midlands Football League, 1990–2000 ===
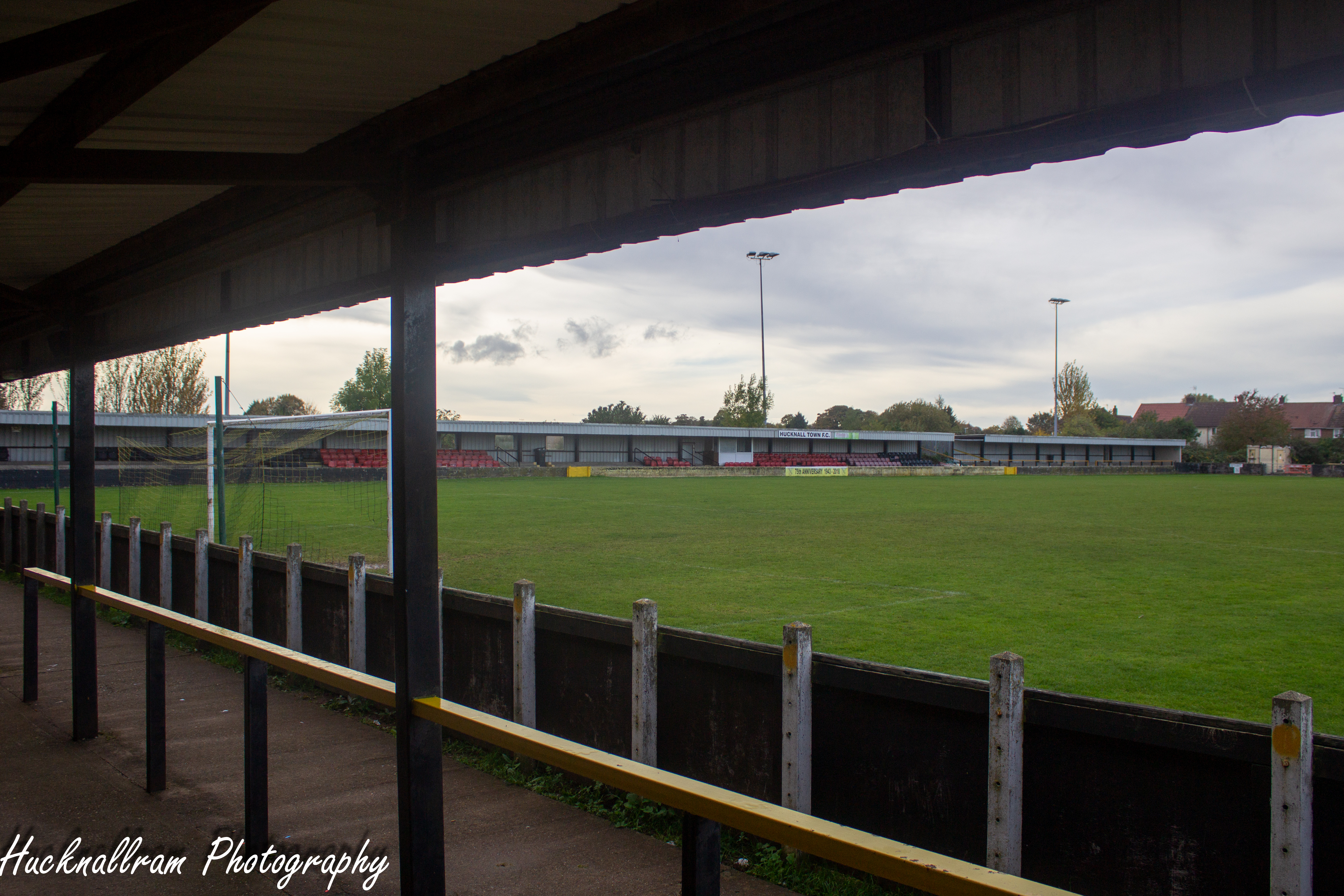
Gedling suffered its biggest-ever competitive loss at Hucknall Town in 1998–99 (Hucknall's Watnall Road ground pictured in 2022)

For 1990–91, the R & R Scaffolding team changed its name to Gedling Town and entered the Central Midlands Football League (CML) Division One. (Note: Although the club was founded in Netherfield and based in Stoke Bardolph, both settlements have been located in the Borough of Gedling since 1974. The Borough is not to be confused with the village of Gedling, which is also situated within its boundaries.) Becoming champions at the first attempt, Gedling then competed in the CML Premier Division (South) in 1991–92. The team led the league for much of the season before finishing runners-up to Slack & Parr. However, the club was still promoted to the CML Supreme Division at the tenth level of the English football league system. (Note: During Gedling's membership of the Central Midlands Football League, its Division One and Premier Division (South) were technically separate from the English football league system, although they fed sequentially into its topmost Supreme Division, which sat at level ten.) During the campaign, Gedling enjoyed what would remain its biggest-ever victory with an 11–0 win against Radford. The 1992–93 season saw Gedling host Football League First Division club Notts County in a friendly. Staged in November "under gruelling conditions", the match ended with a 2–1 defeat for the home side. Manager Mel Oliver stood down in February and was replaced by Dave Sands. Gedling finished seventh in the league and captured the CML's Wakefield Floodlit Cup in May with a 2–0 win over Sheffield Aurora.

Before 1993–94, Gedling again met Notts County in a friendly; they lost 8–0, with Notts forward Gary McSwegan netting four. A month later, the club entered the FA Vase for the first time, eventually losing 3–0 in a preliminary round replay to Walsall Wood. By November, the team had lost just one of their nine previous league games and went on to top the table in the new year. Results slipped thereafter, and Gedling finished in fifth. This season marked the arrival from Arnold Town of full-back Gary Ball, a player who later held the all-time club record for appearances with 216. The 1994–95 campaign proved difficult; the team were eliminated from title contention by January, and manager Dave Sands was sacked to be replaced by Ray Sully. Gedling closed the season in tenth.

Gedling lacked squad depth for 1995–96 but under Sully enjoyed a seven-match unbeaten run by December. After falling out with his players, Sully was replaced in the new year by his assistant, Jamie Brodie, who became player-manager. A mid-table finish in tenth followed. The club again reached the final of the Wakefield Floodlit Cup, but went down 3–1 to Harworth Colliery in both fixtures of a two-legged tie. Under the joint management of Brodie and Andy Kirk, Gedling earned a positive 1–1 draw in a friendly against Notts County before 1996–97. After what Brodie deemed a "shameful display" against Dunkirk in March, the team found form by the following month, going on to finish fourth. Gedling became champions of the CML Supreme Division in 1997–98 by finishing 16 points above the runners-up. (Note: The Northern Counties East Football League erroneously credited Gedling with winning the Central Midlands Football League Premier Division in 1997–98; the club competed in its Supreme Division in this season.) In the process, forward Robbie Orton set an unsurpassed club record for goals in a season with 42. (Note: The Northern Counties East Football League alternatively credited Orton with scoring 41. He also held the club record for most goals scored overall, with 98 from 124 appearances.)

Despite winning the division, the club was not promoted due to inadequate facilities. Brodie and new assistant Everton Marsh strengthened the squad in pre-season, recruiting former Football League forward Gary Lund. Although the club was aiming for back-to-back championships, 1998–99 saw Gedling knocked off the top of the table in October. Poor results ensued; a 6–1 loss at Hucknall Town would remain the club's biggest-ever competitive defeat. In March, Brodie and Marsh resigned to be replaced by caretaker player-managers Jon Flint and John Humphries for the rest of the season. The club had a disappointing sixth-place finish. Paul Elrick and assistant Junior Glare were appointed managers for 1999–2000. Shortly after, the team "lost out narrowly" 2–1 to Football League First Division side Grimsby Town in a pre-season friendly. Finding good league form in December but dogged by injuries, Gedling finished in fourth. However, the club took the CML League Cup with a 3–2 win over South Normanton Athletic.

=== Northern Counties East Football League, 2000–2008 ===
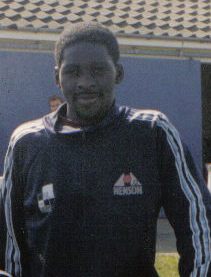
Devon White (pictured in 1988) was assistant manager in 2006–07.

Gedling transferred to the Northern Counties East Football League (NCEL) Division One at tier nine for 2000–01, and the team finished fifth in their first season. Reaching the final of both the Nottinghamshire Senior Cup and the NCEL League Cup, Gedling also made its inaugural appearance in the FA Cup before losing 3–0 to Hinckley United in the first qualifying round. The team won the league in 2001–02, but as in 1997–98, promotion was not obtained after the NCEL deemed the club's ground inadequate. Gedling did, however, capture the Nottinghamshire Senior Cup by beating Southwell City 1–0 at Meadow Lane. (Note: The Northern Counties East Football League erroneously credited Gedling with winning the Nottinghamshire Senior Cup in 2002–03; Hucknall Town won the competition in this season.) Darren Davis and assistant Gary Haywood were appointed managers for 2002–03, presiding over a sixth-place finish.

Haywood led Gedling into 2003–04 without Davis, only to be replaced in the new year by player-managers Mark Clarke, Paul Jepson and Craig Maddison. Closing the season in fifth, the club enjoyed record runs in both national tournaments. A fourth round tie in the FA Vase ended with a 3–2 defeat to Leighton Town, while Gedling bowed out 1–0 to Stalybridge Celtic in the third qualifying round of the FA Cup. Additionally, in February, the club received a fee of £5,000 for forward Steve Scoffham, who joined Notts County of the Football League Second Division.

During 2004–05, Gedling matched its previous FA Vase run before losing 3–0 to Tipton Town. Tournaments hampered form in the league, however, and the club missed promotion by finishing in fifth. The same tension frustrated Jimmy Albans and Graham Harrod as joint-managers for 2005–06; a 2–1 loss to Squires Gate at the same stage of the FA Vase accompanied a fourth-place finish, missing promotion by three points. Albans and Harrod resigned at the end of the season over the club's failure to provide funds to recruit players. Much of the team also departed.

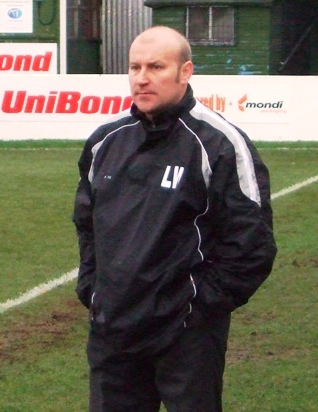
Lee Wilson (pictured in 2007) was manager in 2007–08.

Gary Hayward and Andy Freeman led Gedling into 2006–07 before being dismissed on disciplinary grounds in December. Player-manager James Jepson and assistant Devon White subsequently took charge. The team recruited throughout the season, signing young prospects alongside former Football League midfielder Shaun Murray. Suffering from injury, Jepson was replaced in February by his father, Paul, as Gedling closed in fourteenth. Lee Wilson became manager for 2007–08, with Jimmy Albans returning as assistant. Wilson and Albans oversaw a winning start to the campaign before leaving for Shepshed Dynamo in November, a move that saw John Humphries return to management for the rest of the season, joined by assistant Tony Cox. Challenged by low attendances and a meagre transfer budget, a "disastrous run in" saw Gedling finish in sixth.

=== East Midlands Counties Football League, 2008–2011 ===
Gedling was a founder member of the tenth-tier East Midlands Counties Football League (EMCFL) and its sole Premier Division for 2008–09. Under the new management of Duncan Broad and Mark Allison, the club enjoyed a seven-match unbeaten run in the early part of the campaign before finishing in fourth. In the August of 2009–10, chairman Roland Ash warned that Gedling could fold if not better supported by the community, citing low attendances exacerbated by the Great Recession and the pull of nearby professional clubs. Broad and Allison stood down in January and were replaced by Mick Galloway, who oversaw an upturn in results despite an eventual ninth-place finish after a three-point deduction by the league. This season included participation in the EMCFL League Cup final, in which Gedling beat Dunkirk 2–1 after extra time.

The club's future was jeopardised in October 2010 when Gedling issued a statement "confirming that the Club has folded with immediate effect and will be withdrawing from the East Midlands Counties League and associated competitions". Despite colleagues' attempts to persuade him otherwise, Ash decided to close Gedling for "personal reasons". Four days later, a deal was announced that saw Ash relinquish his chairmanship to Tony Griffith, allowing the club to postpone resignation from the Nottinghamshire Football Association and fulfil its fixtures until the end of 2010–11. Once again, three points were deducted by the EMCFL, and Gedling closed in eighteenth. The club withdrew from the league in June and afterwards ceased to exist. In January 2012, the Football Supporters' Federation listed Gedling among 13 English "clubs in crisis", with each threatened or collapsed by "insolvency events".

=== Season-by-season record from 1990–91 ===
Season	Division	Level	Position	FA Cup	FA Vase	Post-season notes
1990–91	Central Midlands Football League Division One	-	1st/13	-	-	Promoted as champions
1991–92	Central Midlands Football League Premier Division (South)	-	2nd/16	-	-	Promoted as runners-up
1992–93	Central Midlands Football League Supreme Division	10	7th/16	-	-	
1993–94	Central Midlands Football League Supreme Division	10	5th/17	-	PR	
1994–95	Central Midlands Football League Supreme Division	10	10th/17	-	1R	
1995–96	Central Midlands Football League Supreme Division	10	9th/17	-	1QR	
1996–97	Central Midlands Football League Supreme Division	10	4th/16	-	3R	
1997–98	Central Midlands Football League Supreme Division	10	1st/16	-	2QR	Promotion denied due to inadequate facilities
1998–99	Central Midlands Football League Supreme Division	10	6th/19	-	1R	
1999–2000	Central Midlands Football League Supreme Division	10	4th/19	-	2R	Transferred to Northern Counties East Football League Division One at level nine
2000–01	Northern Counties East Football League Division One	9	5th/16	1QR	3R	
2001–02	Northern Counties East Football League Division One	9	1st/16	PR	1R	Promotion denied due to inadequate facilities
2002–03	Northern Counties East Football League Division One	9	6th/17	EPR	3R	
2003–04	Northern Counties East Football League Division One	9	5th/18	3QR	4R	Division dropped one level by default due to creation of Conference North at level six
2004–05	Northern Counties East Football League Division One	10	5th/16	PR	4R	
2005–06	Northern Counties East Football League Division One	10	4th/16	1QR	4R	
2006–07	Northern Counties East Football League Division One	10	14th/17	2QR	3R	
2007–08	Northern Counties East Football League Division One	10	6th/17	2QR	3R	Transferred to East Midlands Counties Football League Premier Division at level ten
2008–09	East Midlands Counties Football League Premier Division	10	4th/18	PR	2QR	
2009–10	East Midlands Counties Football League Premier Division	10	9th/20	EPR	2R	
2010–11	East Midlands Counties Football League Premier Division	10	18th/20	EPR	2R	Withdrew from League and disbanded

== Club identity ==
The club badge used up to and including 2008

Gedling played in a home kit of yellow and blue. Between 2002 and 2010 at least, this comprised a yellow and blue (once specified as navy blue) shirt, yellow and blue shorts (or all blue or all navy blue) and yellow and blue socks (or all yellow or all blue). The team's away kit was all red between 2002 and 2005 at least, after which it changed to red and white. In 2008, it comprised a red and white shirt, red and white shorts and red socks.

The club's first badge, used from 1997 at least, was also yellow and blue and wrapped by the club name. It depicted a football that contained a crest featuring three heraldic knots above a tree. The club's next and final badge, introduced in or after 2008, depicted the club name, a football and a representation of Gedling's nickname—"The Ferrymen". This moniker reflected the location of the team's home ground, the Riverside Stadium, situated behind The Ferry Boat Inn pub, where until the 1950s an ancient ferry had crossed the River Trent to link Stoke Bardolph with Shelford. Prior to this rebranding, Gedling lacked a nickname altogether. The club's principal local rivalry was with Arnold Town, exchanging players and competing with varying frequency in league and tournament fixtures. It also shared rivalries with Arnold Rovers and Pelican in the Notts Amateur League, Dunkirk and Sneinton in the CML, and Radford in the EMCFL.

== Ground ==
=== Riverside Stadium ===
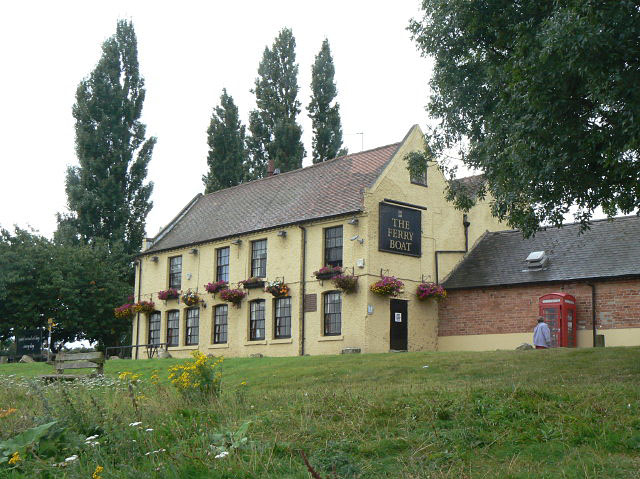
The Ferry Boat Inn pub in Stoke Bardolph (pictured in 2009), behind which the club was based

From 1990 at least, Gedling competed at the Riverside Stadium behind The Ferry Boat Inn pub in Stoke Bardolph. (Note: The Riverside Stadium was named the Riverside Ground until 2008 at least; before then, the Nottingham Evening Post alternatively referred to it as both the "Ferry Ground" and the "Ferry Boat Inn ground".) Floodlights were installed by 1993, and accidental damage to these in 1997 left the ground in darkness during a match against Heanor Town. Another issue occurred a year earlier when the team were stopped from playing at home to Thoresby Colliery Welfare because of a mud-churned goalmouth. Later, in 2001, a match against Pickering Town was cancelled due to Gedling's waterlogged pitch. From 2002 onwards, the ground's amenities included a clubhouse with a licensed bar serving hot and cold food and drink. The stadium initially had a capacity of 2,000 with no seating but overhead cover for 500. Some 500 seats were added in 2005, but these were stripped back to 200 with overhead cover in 2007.

Gedling announced in July 2007 that it had received "an excellent report regarding our set-up" after visits by The Football Association and the BBC. These facilities were used by Notts County for training purposes during its 2008–09 campaign. In assessments made by local authorities after the club's collapse, the stadium comprised two pitches within 2.79 hectares of land. In August 2012, Real United, a Nottingham-based football team aiming to keep young people away from drugs and gang culture, took over the ground and renamed it the Inspire Stadium.

=== Proposed Victoria Park development ===
By February 1995, the club, partnered with the Nottinghamshire Schools' Football Association and Gedling Borough Council, planned to build a new stadium near Victoria Park in Netherfield. The intended site was formerly a marshalling yard owned by British Rail. Initially estimated to cost up to £2.3 million, the proposed complex was to include a bar, clubhouse (with three changing rooms and a clubroom), executive boxes, gym, indoor training equipment, kitchen, office, sports injury clinic and store room. A 100-seater terrace would have standing areas either side of it and overlook three floodlit pitches; one full-size, another for five-a-side and the last made all-weather for alternative sports such as hockey. Borough councillors approved plans for the stadium in October 1995 and applied for £290,000 from the National Lottery on the project's behalf. However, the Lottery rejected the bid on the basis that it would duplicate other facilities in Nottingham. The club's own bid for £225,000 was likewise unsuccessful.

In response to these failures, the Borough Council scaled down its plans in January 1997. Now they would only provide for changing and social facilities, as well as the three pitches. Seating and covered standing room for spectators could be added later. Councillors again approved the initiative in April after consultations with the Environment Agency, Highways Agency, Nottinghamshire Wildlife Trust and Railtrack. By then, the projected cost of the stadium was reduced to £600,000. The Borough Council pledged £190,000 to meet this total, while efforts were also made by the concerned parties to attract the remaining £410,000 from the Sports Council.

Around 200,000 recycled bricks were set aside for the stadium in February 1999, the same month that the Borough Council launched its second National Lottery bid, hoping to secure 35% of the overall funds. The estimated cost had risen to £1 million by the time of a third application in June. Meanwhile, the Borough Council earmarked a further £24,000 and planned another approach to the Sports Council for £556,600. As late as March 2007, with the plans not realised, the club was attempting to re-establish its partnership with the Borough Council to again appeal to the Sports Council for assistance. The project never materialised.

== Honours ==
Honour	Year(s)
Notts Amateur League; Division One champions	1988–89
Central Midlands Football League; Division One champions	1990–91
Central Midlands Football League; Wakefield Floodlit Cup winners	1992–93
Central Midlands Football League; Supreme Division champions	1997–98
Central Midlands Football League; League Cup winners	1999–2000
Northern Counties East Football League; Division One champions	2001–02
Nottinghamshire Senior Cup; Winners	2001–02
East Midlands Counties Football League; League Cup winners	2009–10

== National tournament records ==
Record	Year(s)
FA Cup; Third qualifying round	2003–04
FA Vase; Fourth round	2003–04, 2004–05, 2005–06
