= 2001–02 Northern Premier League =

The 2001–02 Northern Premier League season was the 34th in the history of the Northern Premier League, a football competition in England. Teams were divided into two divisions; the Premier and the First.

== Premier Division ==
Northern Premier League
- Season: 2001–02
- Promoted: Burton Albion
- Relegated: Bamber Bridge; Bishop Auckland
- Matches: 506
- Goals: 1,540 (3.04 per match)
- Biggest home win: Worksop Town 5–0 Accrington Stanley; Emley 5–0 Bamber Bridge; Bradford Park Avenue 5–0 Colwyn Bay
- Biggest away win: Gateshead 0–7 Bradford Park Avenue; Droylsden 0–7 Burton Albion
- Highest scoring: Bradford Park Avenue 3–5 Gateshead; Burscough 6–2 Droylsden; Colwyn Bay 4–4 Hyde United; Marine 4–4 Lancaster City (8 goals)
- Longest winning run: 12 games Burton Albion
- Longest unbeaten run: 30 games Burton Albion
- Longest winless run: 11 games Bamber Bridge
- Longest losing run: 9 games Bamber Bridge
- Highest attendance: 4,478; Burton Albion 3–0 Bishop Auckland
- Lowest attendance: 362; Altrincham 0–1 Vauxhall Motors
- Average attendance: 2,047

The Premier Division featured three new teams:

- Bradford Park Avenue promoted as champions of Division One
- Vauxhall Motors promoted as runners-up of Division One
- Burton Albion transferred from the Southern League Premier Division

=== League table ===
Pos	Team	Pld	W	D	L	GF	GA	GD	Pts	Promotion or relegation
1	Burton Albion (C, P)	44	31	11	2	106	30	+76	104	Promotion to Football Conference
2	Vauxhall Motors	44	27	8	9	86	55	+31	89	
3	Lancaster City	44	23	9	12	80	57	+23	78	
4	Worksop Town	44	23	9	12	74	51	+23	78	
5	Emley	44	22	9	13	69	55	+14	75	Changed name to Wakefield & Emley
6	Accrington Stanley	44	21	9	14	89	64	+25	72	
7	Runcorn F.C. Halton	44	21	8	15	76	53	+23	71 (Note: From this season onwards, Runcorn were known as Runcorn F.C. Halton.)	
8	Barrow	44	19	10	15	75	59	+16	67	
9	Altrincham	44	19	9	16	66	58	+8	66	
10	Bradford Park Avenue	44	18	5	21	77	76	+1	59	
11	Droylsden	44	17	8	19	65	78	−13	59	
12	Blyth Spartans	44	14	16	14	59	62	−3	58	
13	Frickley Athletic	44	16	11	17	63	69	−6	58 (Note: Frickley Athletic were docked 1 point.)	
14	Gateshead	44	14	14	16	58	71	−13	56	
15	Whitby Town	44	15	8	21	61	76	−15	53	
16	Hucknall Town	44	14	9	21	50	68	−18	51	
17	Marine	44	11	17	16	62	71	−9	50	
18	Burscough	44	15	5	24	69	86	−17	50	
19	Gainsborough Trinity	44	13	10	21	61	76	−15	49	
20	Colwyn Bay	44	12	11	21	49	82	−33	47	
21	Bishop Auckland (R)	44	12	8	24	46	68	−22	44 (Note: Bishop Auckland relegated due to ground concerns.)	Relegation to NPL Division One
22	Hyde United	44	10	10	24	61	87	−26	40	
23	Bamber Bridge (R)	44	7	10	27	38	88	−50	30 (Note: Due to Bishop Auckland's dismissal, Bamber Bridge were placed into a play-off to decide if they were to stay up. They were also docked 1 point.)	Qualification for Division One Playoffs

Updated to match(es) played on 8 February 2011. Source: .
Rules for classification: 1) points; 2) goal difference; 3) number of goals scored.
(C) Champions; (P) Promoted; (R) Relegated

=== Results ===
Home \ Away	ACC	ALT	BAM	BRW	BIS	BLY	BPA	BUR	BRT	COL	DRO	EML	FRK	GAI	GAT	HUC	HYD	LNC	MAR	RUN	VAU	WTB	WKS
Accrington Stanley		0–0	2–0	0–3	1–1	0–0	5–1	3–0	3–3	3–0	5–2	0–1	1–1	1–1	2–1	1–2	4–1	3–2	3–1	1–1	2–3	2–3	5–0
Altrincham	3–1		4–3	2–1	1–1	2–1	1–0	0–3	0–2	4–0	2–2	1–2	0–2	1–1	3–1	2–0	1–2	2–3	1–0	0–2	0–1	1–0	2–0
Bamber Bridge	0–1	1–1		1–0	1–2	0–1	2–1	2–3	0–1	1–2	3–3	2–1	0–2	1–0	1–4	1–4	1–3	1–1	0–1	1–6	1–3	3–0	0–0
Barrow	0–4	2–2	1–1		3–1	4–1	2–3	1–0	1–2	1–1	1–2	1–1	3–1	3–0	4–1	6–1	0–0	0–0	1–1	2–1	1–2	2–0	1–0
Bishop Auckland	1–2	2–1	2–0	1–2		1–1	0–4	2–1	1–1	1–2	1–2	1–0	1–1	0–1	1–2	0–2	0–2	1–1	0–0	1–3	3–4	1–0	1–2
Blyth Spartans	1–1	0–3	3–1	1–1	2–1		4–1	2–1	0–1	2–0	0–0	1–3	0–0	2–2	2–1	1–2	2–0	1–0	0–0	2–2	0–1	2–1	2–2
Bradford Park Avenue	1–2	4–1	5–2	2–0	0–2	2–2		0–2	1–4	5–0	3–1	2–1	3–0	2–0	3–5	0–1	3–1	1–0	2–3	3–1	1–3	1–1	1–5
Burscough	3–2	0–2	5–0	3–2	1–0	1–2	0–2		0–0	4–0	6–2	1–1	1–0	3–1	2–2	1–3	0–2	0–6	1–1	1–3	2–3	3–1	2–3
Burton Albion	3–1	1–1	1–1	4–0	3–0	4–0	3–0	4–0		1–0	1–1	2–1	4–0	4–2	5–1	2–0	5–1	3–0	0–0	1–1	2–1	5–1	1–0
Colwyn Bay	3–0	2–5	0–0	0–5	1–2	1–1	1–2	2–1	1–3		1–0	1–0	1–5	2–1	1–2	1–1	4–4	1–2	1–1	1–0	1–0	1–1	0–3
Droylsden	1–5	2–0	0–0	2–0	1–0	0–0	2–2	3–1	0–7	3–2		3–2	1–0	1–2	0–1	3–0	3–2	2–0	0–2	0–1	3–2	2–3	0–2
Emley	0–3	2–1	5–0	2–1	0–1	2–1	1–0	3–0	3–2	2–0	4–2		2–1	2–1	2–2	3–0	2–1	2–1	3–3	1–0	1–1	0–2	1–1
Frickley Athletic	1–3	3–1	2–0	2–3	2–1	1–5	0–0	3–0	0–5	2–1	3–1	1–1		3–1	0–0	0–1	2–2	1–4	3–0	2–4	1–0	1–4	4–0
Gainsborough Trinity	5–2	1–3	5–0	0–1	1–1	2–1	4–1	3–1	0–1	1–2	1–3	1–2	2–2		1–1	0–0	1–0	3–2	0–0	1–4	2–1	2–0	0–2
Gateshead	0–0	0–2	1–1	0–0	1–0	1–1	0–7	2–0	1–1	3–3	2–0	2–0	0–0	1–0		1–1	4–1	1–2	2–4	0–2	0–2	2–0	0–3
Hucknall Town	1–3	0–0	1–1	2–1	2–3	2–1	1–0	1–2	1–2	1–1	1–0	0–4	3–4	1–4	0–0		3–1	0–1	3–2	1–2	1–1	0–1	0–1
Hyde United	2–4	3–2	0–1	1–2	1–3	3–1	2–0	3–2	1–2	1–2	0–3	2–3	0–0	1–1	2–1	0–2		1–1	2–2	0–1	0–0	1–1	3–3
Lancaster City	1–0	1–1	4–1	3–3	1–0	4–2	4–0	0–3	1–0	2–1	2–2	0–1	0–2	5–2	2–0	1–0	4–2		2–1	1–1	2–0	2–3	2–1
Marine	2–5	1–0	0–1	3–2	2–3	0–2	1–2	3–3	1–1	1–1	2–4	2–0	4–0	1–1	1–3	2–0	2–1	4–4		2–0	1–1	0–3	1–1
Runcorn	1–0	0–1	3–2	1–3	3–1	1–2	0–2	4–0	1–3	1–2	2–0	2–0	1–0	4–0	1–1	2–1	3–1	0–2	1–1		1–2	4–1	0–1
Vauxhall Motors	1–2	2–1	1–0	2–0	3–0	2–2	2–1	3–2	1–4	1–1	1–0	1–1	3–1	4–0	4–1	3–1	2–1	4–1	4–1	3–2		0–2	3–2
Whitby Town	2–1	2–3	1–0	2–4	2–0	2–2	1–1	1–3	1–1	1–0	3–0	4–1	1–3	0–4	2–3	2–2	1–2	0–2	2–1	2–2	1–2		0–2
Worksop Town	5–0	1–2	2–0	0–1	2–1	3–0	3–2	3–1	0–1	2–1	0–3	0–0	1–1	4–0	2–1	1–0	3–2	0–1	2–1	1–1	3–3	2–0	

Updated to match(es) played on 3 May 2002. Source: Northern Premier Division results grid
Legend: Blue = home team win; Yellow = draw; Red = away team win.

== Division One ==
Northern Premier League Division One
- Season: 2001–02
- Champions: Harrogate Town
- Promoted: Ashton United; Harrogate Town
- Relegated: Ossett Albion
- Matches: 465
- Goals: 1,405 (3.02 per match)

Division One featured 4 new teams:

- Leek Town relegated from Premier Division
- Spennymoor United relegated from Premier Division
- Ossett Albion promoted as runners-up from the Northern Counties East League Premier Division
- Rossendale United promoted as champions of the North West Counties League Division One

=== League table ===
Pos	Team	Pld	W	D	L	GF	GA	GD	Pts	Promotion or relegation
1	Harrogate Town (C, P)	42	25	11	6	80	35	+45	86	Promotion to Premier Division
2	Ossett Town	42	21	13	8	73	44	+29	76 (Note: Ossett Town were blocked from entering the play-offs, replaced by Radcliffe Borough)	
3	Ashton United (P)	42	21	12	9	90	63	+27	75	Qualification for Division One Playoffs
4	Spennymoor United	42	22	6	14	75	73	+2	72	Qualification for Division One Playoffs
5	Radcliffe Borough	42	20	8	14	73	51	+22	68	Qualification for Division One Playoffs
6	Leek Town	42	20	8	14	67	51	+16	68	
7	Gretna	42	19	7	16	66	66	0	63 (Note: Gretna were docked 1 point)	Transferred to the Scottish Football League
8	Eastwood Town	42	17	11	14	61	59	+2	62	
9	Rossendale United	42	17	10	15	69	58	+11	61	
10	Witton Albion	42	17	10	15	72	68	+4	61	
11	Guiseley	42	18	7	17	60	67	−7	61	
12	North Ferriby United	42	14	16	12	71	60	+11	58	
13	Chorley	42	16	9	17	59	57	+2	57	
14	Matlock Town	42	15	9	18	49	48	+1	54	
15	Trafford	42	14	9	19	64	80	−16	51	
16	Workington	42	12	12	18	51	57	−6	48	
17	Farsley Celtic	42	12	11	19	64	78	−14	47	
18	Belper Town	42	12	11	19	49	66	−17	47	
19	Lincoln United	42	11	14	17	62	80	−18	47	
20	Stocksbridge Park Steels	42	12	9	21	55	76	−21	45	
21	Kendal Town	42	9	9	24	52	76	−24	36	
22	Ossett Albion (R)	42	8	8	26	43	92	−49	32	Relegation to NCEFL Premier Division

Updated to match(es) played on 8 February 2011. Source: .
Rules for classification: 1) points; 2) goal difference; 3) number of goals scored.
(C) Champions; (P) Promoted; (R) Relegated

=== Results ===
Home \ Away	ASH	BLP	CHO	EAS	FAR	GRT	GUI	HAR	KEN	LEE	LIN	MAT	NFU	OSA	OST	RAD	ROS	STO	SPU	TRA	WTN	WRK
Ashton United		3–1	0–2	3–2	5–2	6–2	2–1	1–1	3–2	4–1	3–0	0–1	1–3	2–1	1–1	2–1	3–2	2–3	3–0	1–3	4–2	1–0
Belper Town	1–1		3–1	1–0	2–2	0–2	0–1	3–4	2–1	3–2	0–0	1–1	2–2	1–0	0–1	0–1	2–3	1–2	1–0	0–3	2–3	0–0
Chorley	1–1	1–1		2–2	3–2	5–4	0–1	0–2	4–2	0–0	2–0	0–0	0–2	3–0	2–2	1–2	0–2	2–1	1–0	3–2	1–2	1–2
Eastwood Town	1–1	1–0	0–2		1–1	1–2	2–2	2–2	2–0	2–1	1–2	2–1	1–1	2–1	1–2	0–0	1–0	2–1	3–3	3–1	4–5	0–2
Farsley Celtic	1–1	3–0	2–0	1–0		3–1	1–2	0–3	3–2	3–3	3–4	3–0	2–0	2–4	2–5	1–3	0–1	0–0	2–1	3–0	0–2	1–0
Gretna	2–0	0–0	1–0	4–1	1–0		3–1	0–3	0–0	0–2	2–2	1–2	2–1	2–0	2–1	1–2	0–4	0–1	2–1	4–0	1–3	2–2
Guiseley	2–0	5–4	4–1	0–1	1–0	1–2		2–1	1–0	1–2	3–2	0–2	1–1	4–1	0–2	2–1	0–1	3–0	0–2	1–1	1–1	3–3
Harrogate Town	3–0	6–0	0–1	0–0	5–3	2–1	2–0		1–0	1–0	5–1	3–2	1–1	0–0	1–1	1–0	6–1	2–0	2–0	1–0	0–0	0–2
Kendal Town	2–2	2–1	1–1	2–3	3–2	1–2	1–1	1–3		1–2	1–2	1–3	1–3	5–1	1–5	4–1	0–3	3–1	1–1	0–2	4–2	1–1
Leek Town	2–3	0–1	0–2	2–1	2–0	1–0	1–2	0–0	2–0		2–0	2–0	1–1	1–0	1–0	0–3	4–1	1–3	5–0	5–0	3–2	0–0
Lincoln United	2–1	1–3	2–1	0–3	2–2	1–2	2–2	2–1	1–1	4–2		1–0	2–2	5–0	1–1	1–1	1–1	2–4	3–3	2–2	1–1	0–1
Matlock Town	0–3	2–0	0–1	1–1	2–1	1–1	0–1	1–1	1–2	1–1	5–0		4–2	0–0	0–1	1–0	0–1	0–2	2–0	1–1	5–1	1–2
North Ferriby United	1–1	3–2	2–2	1–3	2–2	6–1	3–0	1–3	2–1	0–0	1–4	0–2		3–1	0–1	0–1	2–0	3–2	2–3	1–1	1–1	2–0
Ossett Albion	1–5	0–0	1–0	1–4	2–2	1–1	1–2	2–4	1–0	1–1	5–1	3–1	3–5		2–0	1–1	0–4	3–1	0–1	3–5	3–1	0–3
Ossett Town	2–2	0–2	1–3	3–1	1–2	3–1	3–0	0–0	1–0	0–1	5–1	2–0	0–0	2–0		2–2	2–1	2–0	3–2	0–0	3–2	2–1
Radcliffe Borough	2–3	0–1	2–1	2–1	1–1	3–2	4–1	4–3	0–1	3–1	0–2	2–0	0–0	4–1	0–3		1–3	1–2	5–0	6–1	5–0	1–1
Rossendale United	1–2	0–0	0–3	1–1	5–2	1–0	5–1	1–2	0–0	3–0	2–2	0–3	1–3	2–0	1–1	0–1		3–3	0–0	3–4	1–2	1–2
Spennymoor United	2–6	2–2	2–1	1–2	2–1	0–2	3–0	1–0	1–1	0–2	2–1	2–0	2–1	3–2	3–3	2–1	1–1		2–1	4–1	4–2	5–4
Stocksbridge Park Steels	3–3	2–1	2–0	0–1	0–1	2–2	2–1	0–1	5–1	1–2	0–0	2–0	1–4	3–0	2–2	3–2	0–1	1–2		3–2	1–3	0–0
Trafford	1–3	1–2	3–1	0–1	2–2	1–4	1–2	1–2	0–1	2–1	3–1	3–0	1–1	1–1	1–0	0–1	3–3	1–2	3–1		0–1	1–1
Witton Albion	1–1	2–0	1–1	4–0	0–0	1–2	3–1	0–0	2–0	0–4	2–1	1–1	0–0	0–1	1–3	0–2	0–3	5–0	7–2	0–0		5–0
Workington	1–1	2–3	0–3	0–1	4–0	0–2	0–1	0–2	2–1	2–4	1–0	0–1	1–1	4–0	1–1	1–1	0–2	2–1	0–1	2–3	1–3	

Updated to match(es) played on 3 May 2002. Source: Northern Premier League First Division results grid
Legend: Blue = home team win; Yellow = draw; Red = away team win.

=== Play-offs ===
Semifinals
23°PD	Bamber Bridge	3
5°D1	Radcliffe Borough	2
3°D1	Ashton United	3
4°D1	Spennymoor United	1

Final
23°PD	Bamber Bridge	1
3°D1	Ashton United	2

== Promotion and relegation ==
In the thirty-fourth season of the Northern Premier League Burton Albion (as champions) were automatically promoted to the Football Conference. Bishop Auckland and Bamber Bridge were relegated to the First Division; these two clubs were replaced by relegated Conference side Stalybridge Celtic, First Division winners Harrogate Town and play-off winners Ashton United. In the First Division Gretna left the League to join the Scottish Football League Third Division, while Ossett Albion left the League altogether; these teams were replaced by newly admitted Alfreton Town and Kidsgrove Athletic.

== Cup Results ==
Challenge Cup: Teams from both leagues.

- Accrington Stanley bt. Bradford Park Avenue

President's Cup: 'Plate' competition for losing teams in the NPL Cup.

- Barrow bt. Gainsborough Trinity

Chairman's Cup: 'Plate' competition for losing teams in the NPL Cup.

- Worksop Town bt. Droylsden

Peter Swales Shield: Between Champions of NPL Premier Division and Winners of the NPL Cup.

- Accrington Stanley bt. Burton Albion
