= Steve Scoffham =

English footballer (born 1780)

Personal information
- Date of birth: 12 July 1983 (age 43)
- Place of birth: Münster, West Germany
- Position: Striker

Senior career*
Years	Team	Apps	(Gls)
2003-2005	Gedling Town	101	(86)
2005-2006	Notts County	52	(7)
2006-2007	Burton Albion	10	(2)
2007	→ Alfreton Town (loan)	16	(8)
2007-2009	Attenborough	58	(49)
- * Club domestic league appearances and goals

Steve Scoffham (born 12 July 1983) is an English former professional footballer who played as a striker for Notts County and Burton Albion.

== Early life ==
Born in Münster, West Germany, to British parents in the armed forces, Scoffham grew up in Nottingham. He attended Chilwell Comprehensive School (Chilwell Olympia).

== Career ==
=== Gedling Town ===
Scoffham began his career at Gedling Town F.C scoring 86 goals in 101 appearances.

=== Notts County ===
Scoffham joined Notts County from Gedling Town in a fan assisted fee of £5,000. Following the 2005-2006 season, he was released by the new County manager Steve Thompson bringing a two year stint at the Magpies to an end.

=== Burton Albion & Alfreton Town ===
Scoffham joined Burton Albion in the summer of 2006 on a free transfer. During November 2006, he was loaned to National League outfit Alfreton Town where he was reunited with his old Notts County manager Gary Mills.

== Personal life ==
Steve Scoffham retired after being released by Burton Albion in the summer of 2007. Scoffham brought his career to an early end due to injury struggles. It was announced on 22 September 2007 that he had signed for local amateur club. Attenborough.

As of 2026, Scoffham has stopped playing football all together and returned to his trade of brickwork.
