= 2003–04 Northern Premier League =

The 2003–04 Northern Premier League season was the 36th in the history of the Northern Premier League, a football competition in England. Teams were divided into two divisions; the Premier and the First. This season was the last before the formation of the Conference North and the Conference South, so most of the Premier Division teams were promoted to the Conference North for next season. Subsequently, the First Division had most of its teams promoted to the Premier Division, with new teams admitted from the leagues just below the Northern Premier in the English football league system, although the league reform meant that the "promoted" clubs remained in the same tier within the English football league system, and further meant that while there was no relegation within the NPL itself, those clubs that missed out on promotion nevertheless had their position within the league system downgraded by one tier.

During this season, Radcliffe Borough's Jody Banim broke the English record for the most consecutive games where a player has scored at least one goal, which ran from 9 September to 4 November.

== Premier Division ==
Northern Premier League Premier Division
- Season: 2003–04
- Champions: Hucknall Town
- Promoted: Team List: Hucknall Town; Droylsden; Barrow; Alfreton Town; Harrogate Town; Southport; Worksop Town; Lancaster City; Vauxhall Motors; Gainsborough Trinity; Stalybridge Celtic; Altrincham; Runcorn F.C. Halton; Ashton United; Bradford Park Avenue
- Relegated: None
- Matches: 513
- Goals: 1,540 (3 per match)

The Premier Division featured four new teams:

- Southport relegated from the Football Conference
- Alfreton Town promoted as champions of Division One
- Spennymoor United promoted as runner-up of Division One
- Radcliffe Borough promoted as via playoff from Division One

=== League table ===
Pos	Team	Pld	W	D	L	GF	GA	GD	Pts	Promotion or qualification
1	Hucknall Town (C, P)	44	29	8	7	83	38	+45	95	Promotion to Conference North
2	Droylsden (P)	44	26	8	10	96	64	+32	86	Promotion to Conference North
3	Barrow (P)	44	22	14	8	82	52	+30	80	Promotion to Conference North
4	Alfreton Town (P)	44	23	9	12	73	43	+30	78	Promotion to Conference North
5	Harrogate Town (P)	44	24	5	15	79	63	+16	77	Promotion to Conference North
6	Southport (P)	44	20	10	14	71	52	+19	70	Promotion to Conference North
7	Worksop Town (P)	44	19	13	12	69	50	+19	70	Promotion to Conference North
8	Lancaster City (P)	44	20	9	15	62	49	+13	69	Promotion to Conference North
9	Vauxhall Motors (P)	44	19	10	15	78	75	+3	67	Promotion to Conference North
10	Gainsborough Trinity (P)	44	17	13	14	70	52	+18	64	Promotion to Conference North
11	Stalybridge Celtic (P)	44	18	10	16	72	66	+6	64	Promotion to Conference North
12	Altrincham (P)	44	16	15	13	66	51	+15	63	Promotion to Conference North
13	Runcorn F.C. Halton (P)	44	16	13	15	67	63	+4	61	Promotion to Conference North
14	Ashton United (P)	44	17	8	19	59	79	−20	59 (Note: Although Ashton United did not progress through the playoffs, they were promoted nonetheless.)	Qualification for Playoffs
15	Whitby Town	44	14	11	19	55	70	−15	53	Qualification for Playoffs
16	Marine	44	13	12	19	62	74	−12	51	Qualification for Playoffs
17	Bradford Park Avenue (P)	44	12	14	18	48	62	−14	50	Qualification for Playoffs
18	Spennymoor United	44	14	6	24	55	93	−38	48	Qualification for Playoffs
19	Burscough	44	10	15	19	47	67	−20	45	Qualification for Playoffs
20	Radcliffe Borough	44	12	6	26	74	99	−25	42	Qualification for Playoffs
21	Blyth Spartans	44	10	10	24	54	74	−20	40	
22	Frickley Athletic	44	11	7	26	51	83	−32	40	
23	Wakefield & Emley	44	8	6	30	45	99	−54	30	Changed name to Wakefield-Emley

Updated to match(es) played on 8 February 2011. Source:
Rules for classification: 1) points; 2) goal difference; 3) number of goals scored.
(C) Champions; (P) Promoted

=== Results ===
Home \ Away	ALF	ALT	ASH	BRW	BLY	BPA	BUR	DRO	FRK	GAI	HAR	HUC	LNC	MAR	RAD	RUN	SOU	SPU	STL	VAU	W&E	WTB	WKS
Alfreton Town		0–0	5–0	1–1	2–1	1–1	1–0	4–2	1–2	3–1	2–0	2–1	3–0	4–0	0–0	0–2	0–2	1–1	3–1	5–1	2–1	3–0	2–1
Altrincham	0–1		1–2	1–1	1–2	1–0	3–0	1–0	1–1	2–2	0–0	2–3	0–0	3–3	4–1	1–0	1–0	1–1	3–3	3–1	1–2	4–0	2–1
Ashton United	1–1	0–2		1–2	2–0	0–2	0–0	1–1	3–2	1–1	3–4	1–6	2–1	4–3	3–3	4–2	2–1	1–2	2–1	0–1	2–3	1–3	0–3
Barrow	1–2	2–1	3–0		3–0	4–0	3–3	2–1	3–1	3–0	1–2	1–0	4–3	1–1	2–0	1–0	1–1	2–0	0–2	0–1	3–2	0–0	1–0
Blyth Spartans	1–0	2–2	2–0	0–2		0–0	0–2	1–5	1–3	1–1	3–4	1–2	0–0	5–0	1–0	3–3	1–4	0–2	0–1	3–6	1–0	1–1	3–3
Bradford Park Avenue	0–1	1–1	2–1	2–2	1–1		0–2	0–2	0–0	0–0	2–3	1–2	0–2	1–1	1–1	1–1	0–1	0–0	2–3	6–2	1–2	2–3	0–1
Burscough	4–1	3–1	1–2	1–1	1–2	1–1		1–3	3–1	0–0	1–0	0–1	0–1	0–0	3–6	1–3	0–3	2–1	0–0	3–1	1–1	1–1	0–0
Droylsden	2–1	1–4	1–2	1–1	3–3	3–0	2–0		4–0	2–1	3–1	3–1	0–0	4–2	5–4	1–2	3–2	2–0	2–0	2–1	3–1	2–1	2–2
Frickley Athletic	0–3	1–1	1–2	4–2	2–1	0–1	2–0	0–3		0–0	0–0	0–1	0–2	4–3	3–0	1–2	1–2	3–2	1–2	0–2	2–1	3–1	1–1
Gainsborough Trinity	2–4	2–3	3–0	0–0	2–0	3–3	4–1	1–2	3–0		2–0	2–1	3–2	2–0	6–2	0–1	1–2	3–1	0–0	0–0	3–0	2–2	2–1
Harrogate Town	1–0	1–0	2–1	2–1	2–1	0–1	2–1	4–4	2–1	0–2		1–2	0–1	4–1	3–0	1–1	3–1	3–1	4–3	3–2	5–0	1–0	0–2
Hucknall Town	3–3	2–1	2–0	3–1	1–0	0–0	1–0	1–1	3–0	2–0	1–0		3–0	1–1	1–1	1–0	4–0	2–1	1–3	2–0	0–1	1–0	3–1
Lancaster City	0–1	1–0	1–1	0–3	1–1	1–3	4–0	2–1	1–1	0–1	1–4	3–1		3–1	4–2	0–1	1–0	6–0	2–1	0–0	3–0	4–3	2–0
Marine	0–1	0–1	0–2	1–2	1–0	2–0	4–0	1–2	2–1	3–1	2–2	1–1	1–1		3–2	1–3	1–1	1–3	0–2	3–2	3–0	2–2	0–2
Radcliffe Borough	1–0	1–3	1–2	2–3	2–3	2–0	1–2	4–2	4–2	2–1	3–1	1–6	0–2	3–1		1–2	1–3	1–1	3–2	1–2	4–1	0–5	1–2
Runcorn	2–2	0–3	1–2	0–0	1–0	1–2	0–0	2–2	2–0	2–2	4–1	1–2	0–1	0–2	2–2		1–1	1–2	3–0	1–1	5–3	1–1	2–3
Southport	1–0	2–2	0–0	1–1	1–0	0–1	2–1	4–1	3–1	2–0	3–2	1–1	3–0	0–0	2–1	0–3		2–3	2–3	1–1	1–1	3–0	2–3
Spennymoor United	1–0	2–1	3–2	2–4	0–5	2–4	0–2	0–1	3–2	0–6	1–5	1–3	0–1	0–2	3–1	2–1	0–2		1–3	2–1	4–4	2–0	1–1
Stalybridge Celtic	3–0	1–0	1–1	2–2	2–0	2–0	1–1	2–1	5–0	2–0	1–2	1–2	0–3	1–1	0–2	2–2	2–1	0–2		3–4	3–3	1–3	0–3
Vauxhall Motors	2–0	1–1	1–2	1–1	2–1	6–2	3–2	2–4	2–1	0–2	3–0	1–3	2–1	1–0	0–5	6–0	3–2	4–2	1–1		1–0	1–1	1–1
Wakefield & Emley	0–5	2–0	1–2	2–5	1–2	0–1	2–2	0–2	0–2	0–2	0–2	0–3	1–0	0–4	2–1	3–5	0–1	2–0	1–3	0–1		0–3	1–1
Whitby Town	0–4	2–3	0–1	3–2	2–1	0–1	1–1	1–2	2–1	2–1	0–2	0–0	2–1	1–2	1–0	1–0	0–5	1–0	0–2	1–1	2–1		2–3
Worksop Town	0–0	0–0	3–0	2–4	1–0	1–2	1–1	1–3	3–0	0–0	1–0	0–3	0–0	1–2	4–1	0–1	1–0	4–0	2–1	4–3	4–0	1–1	

Updated to match(es) played on 24 April 2004. Source: Northern Premier Division results grid
Legend: Blue = home team win; Yellow = draw; Red = away team win.

=== Play-offs ===
Eight teams competed for the final Conference North place; including Hyde United, champions of Division One.

Quarter-finals
14°PD	Ashton United	2
1°Div.1	Hyde United	1
17°PD	Bradford Park Avenue	3
18°PD	Spennymoor United	1
15°PD	Whitby Town	2(2)
20°PD	Radcliffe Borough	2(4)
16°PD	Marine	1
19°PD	Burscough	3

Semi-finals
14°PD	Ashton United	1
17°PD	Bradford Park Avenue	2
20°PD	Radcliffe Borough	0
19°PD	Burscough	2

Final
17°PD	Bradford Park Avenue	2
19°PD	Burscough	0

== Division One ==
Northern Premier League Division One
- Season: 2003–04
- Champions: Hyde United
- Promoted: Team List: Hyde United; Matlock Town; Farsley Celtic; Lincoln United; Witton Albion; Gateshead; Workington; Leek Town; Guiseley; Bamber Bridge; Bridlington Town; Prescot Cables; Bishop Auckland; Ossett Town
- Relegated: None
- Matches: 463
- Goals: 1,372 (2.96 per match)

Division One featured five new teams:

- Colwyn Bay relegated from the Premier Division
- Gateshead relegated via Playoff from the Premier Division
- Hyde United relegated from the Premier Division
- Bridlington Town as champions of the Northern Counties East League Premier Division
- Prescot Cables as champions of the North West Counties League Division One

=== League table ===
Pos	Team	Pld	W	D	L	GF	GA	GD	Pts	Promotion
1	Hyde United (C, P)	42	24	8	10	79	49	+30	80	Promotion to NPL Premier Division and Playoffs
2	Matlock Town (P)	42	23	7	12	78	51	+27	76	Promotion to NPL Premier Division
3	Farsley Celtic (P)	42	20	14	8	78	56	+22	74	Promotion to NPL Premier Division
4	Lincoln United (P)	42	20	11	11	73	53	+20	71	Promotion to NPL Premier Division
5	Witton Albion (P)	42	17	12	13	61	56	+5	63	Promotion to NPL Premier Division
6	Gateshead (P)	42	21	4	17	65	68	−3	63 (Note: Gateshead were docked 4 points and Ossett Town were docked 3 points.)	Promotion to NPL Premier Division
7	Workington (P)	42	17	11	14	70	58	+12	62	Promotion to NPL Premier Division
8	Leek Town (P)	42	16	13	13	56	47	+9	61	Promotion to NPL Premier Division
9	Guiseley (P)	42	16	12	14	66	54	+12	60	Promotion to NPL Premier Division
10	Bamber Bridge (P)	42	16	12	14	64	53	+11	60	Promotion to NPL Premier Division
11	Bridlington Town (P)	42	16	10	16	70	68	+2	58	Promotion to NPL Premier Division
12	Prescot Cables (P)	42	16	10	16	63	65	−2	58	Promotion to NPL Premier Division
13	Bishop Auckland (P)	42	14	13	15	61	64	−3	55	Promotion to NPL Premier Division
14	Ossett Town (P)	42	15	10	17	62	73	−11	52	Promotion to NPL Premier Division
15	Rossendale United	42	13	12	17	53	62	−9	51	
16	Colwyn Bay	42	14	9	19	56	82	−26	51	
17	North Ferriby United	42	13	11	18	64	70	−6	50	
18	Chorley	42	13	10	19	54	70	−16	49	
19	Stocksbridge Park Steels	42	12	12	18	57	69	−12	48	
20	Belper Town	42	9	15	18	44	58	−14	42	
21	Kendal Town	42	11	7	24	53	79	−26	40	
22	Kidsgrove Athletic	42	10	9	23	45	67	−22	39	

Rules for classification: 1) points; 2) goal difference; 3) number of goals scored.
(C) Champions; (P) Promoted

=== Results ===
Home \ Away	BAM	BLP	BIS	BRI	CHO	COL	FAR	GAT	GUI	HYD	KEN	KID	LEE	LIN	MAT	NFU	OST	PRC	ROS	STO	WTN	WRK
Bamber Bridge		2–1	1–3	2–0	0–0	1–1	1–2	0–2	1–2	2–3	5–1	3–0	0–0	1–0	4–4	1–1	0–0	2–2	2–1	4–0	1–2	2–0
Belper Town	2–1		1–1	0–2	2–0	2–0	1–1	1–1	1–0	0–1	3–0	1–1	0–2	0–1	0–2	0–3	3–0	2–2	0–0	1–0	0–0	1–1
Bishop Auckland	0–1	2–4		3–2	1–1	4–1	4–2	2–1	1–0	2–3	2–0	2–0	2–3	1–1	0–1	0–4	2–0	1–1	3–3	2–2	1–2	1–1
Bridlington Town	1–0	1–3	2–0		2–0	4–1	3–1	1–0	2–1	3–1	5–1	2–1	3–2	0–1	1–1	2–2	2–4	1–1	0–1	2–2	1–1	2–4
Chorley	0–1	1–1	2–1	1–1		3–2	1–2	4–1	1–2	1–0	2–2	2–1	1–0	2–3	2–0	1–2	1–2	4–2	2–0	1–3	1–1	4–1
Colwyn Bay	0–5	3–2	2–3	1–1	3–4		1–0	1–3	1–0	1–1	0–5	5–0	1–3	3–3	0–0	1–0	4–4	0–2	1–0	1–1	1–2	0–0
Farsley Celtic	1–1	2–2	4–0	2–2	1–0	5–0		3–3	5–3	1–3	2–1	1–1	0–0	2–2	1–2	5–0	2–1	0–2	1–0	3–1	1–0	2–1
Gateshead	2–1	2–1	0–3	2–3	1–0	1–2	3–4		1–5	2–1	2–1	2–1	4–2	1–0	1–3	3–2	0–2	1–1	2–0	4–1	1–0	2–3
Guiseley	1–1	3–0	1–1	2–1	1–3	1–2	2–0	4–2		0–1	4–0	2–0	1–1	1–2	3–1	1–2	1–1	0–1	2–1	0–0	2–2	3–1
Hyde United	4–0	3–1	1–1	3–1	0–0	4–0	1–1	0–2	1–0		1–0	1–0	0–1	2–0	2–1	4–0	5–2	4–1	2–0	1–1	0–1	3–1
Kendal Town	2–3	2–1	1–2	1–0	1–1	2–1	2–2	1–2	2–2	1–3		1–2	2–1	2–3	1–2	1–1	0–1	2–3	2–1	2–1	2–1	0–5
Kidsgrove Athletic	1–1	2–0	1–1	4–2	2–2	1–2	1–4	2–1	1–2	1–2	2–1		0–1	1–2	1–0	4–1	1–2	0–1	1–3	2–1	0–2	1–1
Leek Town	1–0	1–1	0–0	3–2	2–0	0–1	1–2	0–0	2–2	5–2	1–0	1–2		3–1	0–2	1–2	0–1	1–1	2–1	2–0	2–2	1–2
Lincoln United	1–1	0–0	0–0	2–0	4–1	2–1	0–1	0–1	2–2	2–0	4–3	2–1	1–1		5–2	3–3	0–0	1–0	4–0	0–0	4–1	1–0
Matlock Town	1–0	3–1	0–1	3–5	4–0	1–1	2–0	2–0	1–2	2–5	0–0	3–1	1–0	4–2		1–1	3–0	2–1	4–1	3–1	2–1	4–0
North Ferriby United	2–0	2–0	0–3	2–2	2–3	5–0	0–2	1–2	2–0	2–0	3–1	2–1	1–1	0–1	0–2		2–3	4–1	2–3	1–1	1–3	1–1
Ossett Town	2–3	2–0	0–0	0–1	1–0	4–1	1–2	4–0	1–2	2–2	0–2	1–1	0–2	3–1	0–4	2–2		2–2	0–0	3–0	2–3	1–2
Prescot Cables	2–3	1–0	4–2	1–1	4–1	0–2	0–1	2–0	1–0	0–1	2–1	2–1	1–3	1–0	0–2	3–1	5–3		0–1	2–3	3–0	0–2
Rossendale United	3–2	1–1	3–0	3–1	0–0	1–3	1–1	1–3	1–1	1–2	0–0	0–0	1–1	4–2	2–0	1–0	1–2	5–2		0–0	0–1	3–3
Stocksbridge Park Steels	1–3	3–3	2–1	2–0	4–0	0–3	2–2	3–0	1–1	2–2	0–2	2–1	0–2	3–2	2–1	3–0	1–2	3–1	2–4		0–1	0–1
Witton Albion	0–0	2–0	2–0	2–1	3–1	0–1	2–2	0–2	1–2	4–3	3–1	0–0	1–1	1–3	1–1	1–1	3–1	2–2	5–0	1–3		1–2
Workington	1–2	1–1	4–2	1–2	4–0	2–1	2–2	0–2	2–2	1–1	0–1	0–1	3–0	0–5	2–1	2–1	7–0	0–0	0–1	2–0	4–0	

Updated to match(es) played on 24 April 2004. Source: Northern Premier League First Division results grid
Legend: Blue = home team win; Yellow = draw; Red = away team win.

== Promotion and relegation ==
In the thirty-sixth season of the Northern Premier League the top fourteen teams of the Premier Division plus Bradford Park Avenue were promoted to the newly formed Conference North. They were replaced by the top fourteen teams of the First Division, who in turn were replaced by the following fourteen teams:

- Gresley Rovers (from the Southern League Western Division)
- Shepshed Dynamo (from the Southern League Western Division)
- Ilkeston Town (from the Southern League Western Division)
- Willenhall Town
- Eastwood Town
- Mossley
- Rocester
- A.F.C. Telford United
- Brigg Town
- Warrington Town
- Ossett Albion
- Clitheroe
- Woodley Sports
- Spalding United

While no teams were relegated this season, the league reform meant the teams that missed out on "promotion" remained in a league that had its position in the English football league system downgraded by one tier while the "promoted" teams actually remained on the same level of the league system.

== Cup results ==
Challenge Cup: Teams from both leagues.

- Droylsden bt. Hucknall Town

President's Cup: 'Plate' competition for losing teams in the NPL Cup.

- Barrow bt. Workington

Chairman's Cup: 'Plate' competition for losing teams in the NPL Cup.

- Hyde United bt. Leek Town

Peter Swales Shield: Between Champions of NPL Premier Division and Winners of the NPL Cup.

- Droylsden bt. Hucknall Town

== See also ==
- Northern Premier League
- 2003–04 Southern Football League
- 2003–04 Isthmian League
