= Brodsworth Main F.C. =

Brodsworth Main FC
- Full name: Brodsworth Main FC
- Nickname: Broddy
- Founded: 1908 (as Brodsworth Main FC)
- Ground: Welfare Ground
- Capacity: 3,000 (228 seats)
- Chairman: Tony Richardson
- Manager: Craig Pattison
- League: Central Midlands Alliance Premier Division North
- 2025–26: Central Midlands Alliance Premier Division North, 4th of 17
Home colours

Brodsworth Main Football Club is a football club based in Woodlands, Doncaster, South Yorkshire, England. They are currently members of the Central Midlands Alliance Premier Division North and play at the Welfare Ground.

== History ==
Brodsworth Main FC (as they were first known) were founded in 1908 by Brodsworth Main Colliery Sports and Pastimes Club which existed 1909-1923. Entering the South Yorkshire football league for their inaugural season on 1909-10 season then moving ont the Sheffield Association League for their campaign in 1910–11. They joined the Yorkshire League in 1921 and won the title in 1924–25, but left the league in 1935.

After the Second World War the club returned to the league for a third spell. In 1950–51 they were relegated to Division Two after finishing second from bottom of Division One. They withdrew from the league at the end of the 1956–57 season, but returned in 1961. Two years later they were renamed Brodsworth Miners Welfare.

In their first season under the new name the club finished fourth in Division Two and were promoted to Division One, but were relegated back again after just a single season. After finishing bottom of Division Two in 1972 the club was relegated to Division Three, where they remained until withdrawing in 1976.

Brodsworth Miners Welfare played in the Doncaster Senior League throughout the 1980s and won the league title in 1985. In 1988 they joined the Northern Counties East League (NCEL), entering Division Two. They were promoted to Division One when the league restructured in 1991 (despite finishing second bottom of Division Two) and floundered at the foot of the NCEL for several years, until winning promotion to the Premier Division in 1999.

In 2006 they were renamed Brodsworth Welfare AFC, and despite finishing bottom again in 2006–07 they again avoided being demoted. They were finally relegated at the end of the 2009–10 season after again finishing bottom, and they resigned from the NCEL in the summer of 2011 after finishing bottom of Division One.

In 2010, the club fielded its first women’s team in the Sheffield and Hallamshire county women’s league, unfortunately the team folded a few season later.

Since 2011, the club has had four spells back in the Doncaster Senior League (2011–12, 2016–17, 2018–19 and 2022/23 to present day) and two spells in the Central Midlands League (2012–13 to 2015–16 and 2017–18). The club was dissolved at the end of the 2019-20 season. The club was once again resurrected for the 2022/23 season, entering teams to play in the Doncaster Rovers Saturday and Sunday league. Ahead of the 2025/26 season, the club merged with Hatfield Town F.C. to form a new club, Brodsworth Main FC.

=== Season-by-season record ===
Season	Division	Level	Position	FA Cup	FA Amateur Cup	FA Vase	Notes
Formed as Brodsworth Main Colliery
1908-09	South Yorkshire Football League						
1909-10	South Yorkshire Football League						
1910–11	Sheffield Association League	-	14th/14	-	-	-	
1911–12	Sheffield Association League	-	15th/16	-	-	-	
1912–13	Sheffield Association League	-	13th/15	PR	-	-	
1913–14	Sheffield Association League	-		2QR	-	-	
1914–15	Sheffield Association League	-		PR	-	-	
1919–20	Sheffield Association League	-		1QR	-	-	
1920–21	Doncaster & District League	-	1st/11	3QR	-	-	
1921–22	Yorkshire League	-	3rd/17	2QR	-	-	
1922–23	Yorkshire League	-	9th/16	PR	-	-	
1923–24	Yorkshire League	-	7th/18	PR	-	-	
1924–25	Yorkshire League	-	1st/16	PR	-	-	
1925–26	Yorkshire League	-	6th/15	EPR	-	-	
1926–27	Yorkshire League	-	9th/16	4QR	-	-	
1927–28	Yorkshire League	-	7th/13	2QR	-	-	
1928–29	Yorkshire League	-	15th/16	-	-	-	
1929–30	Yorkshire League	-	11th/14	3QR	-	-	
1930–31	Yorkshire League	-	11th/12	1QR	-	-	
1931–32	Doncaster & District Senior League	-		1QR	-	-	
1932–33	Yorkshire League	-	7th/10	PR	-	-	
1933–34	Yorkshire League	-	13th/13	PR	-	-	
1934–35	Yorkshire League	-	17th/18	EPR	-	-	
1938–39	Sheffield Association League	-		PR	-	-	
1945–46	Sheffield Association League	-		2QR	-	-	
1946–47	Sheffield Association League	-		2QR	-	-	
1947–48	Yorkshire League	-	18th/20	PR	-	-	
1948–49	Yorkshire League	-	18th/20	EPR	-	-	
1949–50	Yorkshire League Division 1	-	13th/18	3QR	-	-	
1950–51	Yorkshire League Division 1	-	17th/18	PR	-		Relegated
1951–52	Yorkshire League Division 2	-	10th/13	1QR	-	-	
1952–53	Yorkshire League Division 2	-	12th/14	1QR	-	-	
1953–54	Yorkshire League Division 2	-	15th/16	1QR	-	-	
1954–55	Yorkshire League Division 2	-	13th/16	1QR	-	-	
1955–56	Yorkshire League Division 2	-	12th/16	1QR	-	-	
1956–57	Yorkshire League Division 2	-	12th/17	-	EPR	-	
1957–58	Doncaster & District Senior League Division 1	-		-	3QR	-	
1958–59	Doncaster & District Senior League Division 1	-	5th/13	-	PR	-	
1959–60	Doncaster & District Senior League Division 1	-	3rd/13	-		-	
1960–61	Doncaster & District Senior League Division 1	-	4th/12	-		-	
1961–62	Yorkshire League Division 2	-	11th/14	-	-	-	
1962–63	Yorkshire League Division 2	-	11th/15	-	-	-	
Changed name to Brodsworth Miners Welfare (1963)
1963–64	Yorkshire League Division 2	-	4th/15	-	-	-	Promoted
1964–65	Yorkshire League Division 1	-	16th/16	-	-	-	Relegated
1965–66	Yorkshire League Division 2	-	15th/15	-	-	-	
1966–67	Yorkshire League Division 2	-	17th/17	-	-	-	
1967–68	Yorkshire League Division 2	-	15th/17	-	-	-	
1968–69	Yorkshire League Division 2	-	11th/15	-	-	-	
1969–70	Yorkshire League Division 2	-	7th/18	-	-	-	
1970–71	Yorkshire League Division 2	-	13th/14	-	-	-	
1971–72	Yorkshire League Division 2	-	15th/15	-	-	-	Relegated
1972–73	Yorkshire League Division 3	-	14th/16	-	-	-	
1973–74	Yorkshire League Division 3	-	13th/16	-	-	-	
1974–75	Yorkshire League Division 3	-	15th/16	-	-	-	
1975–76	Yorkshire League Division 3	-	16th/16	-	-	-	
1976–77	Doncaster & District Senior League Division 3	-		-	-	-	
1977–78	Doncaster & District Senior League Division 3	-	4th/14	-	-	-	Promoted
1978–79	Doncaster & District Senior League Division 2	-	1st/14	-	-	-	Promoted
1979–80	Doncaster & District Senior League Division 1	-		-	-	-	
1980–81	Doncaster & District Senior League Division 1	-	9th/16	-	-	-	
1981–82	Doncaster & District Senior League Division 1	-	8th/14	-	-	-	
1982–83	Doncaster & District Senior League Division 1	-	2nd/14	-	-	-	
1983–84	Doncaster & District Senior League Division 1	-	1st/15	-	-	-	Promoted
1984–85	Doncaster & District Senior League Premier Division	-	1st/15	-	-	-	
1985–86	Doncaster & District Senior League Premier Division	-	3rd/16	-	-	-	
1986–87	Doncaster & District Senior League Premier Division	-	2nd/14	-	-	-	
1987–88	Doncaster & District Senior League Premier Division	-	8th/11	-	-	-	
1988–89	Northern Counties East League Division 2	-	12th/14	-	-	-	
1989–90	Northern Counties East League Division 2	-	9th/14	-	-	-	
1990–91	Northern Counties East League Division 2	-	12th/13	-	-	EPR	
1991–92	Northern Counties East League Division 1	-	15th/16	-	-	EPR	
1992–93	Northern Counties East League Division 1	-	13th/14	-	-	-	
1993–94	Northern Counties East League Division 1	-	15th/15	-	-	-	
1994–95	Northern Counties East League Division 1	-	16th/16	-	-	-	
1995–96	Northern Counties East League Division 1	-	16th/16	-	-	-	
1996–97	Northern Counties East League Division 1	-	14th/15	-	-	1QR	
1997–98	Northern Counties East League Division 1	-	12th/15	PR	-	2R	
1998–99	Northern Counties East League Division 1	-	2nd/13	1QR	-	1R	Promoted
1999–00	Northern Counties East League Premier Division	-	6th/20	1QR	-	2QR	
2000–01	Northern Counties East League Premier Division	-	18th/20	PR	-	2QR	
2001–02	Northern Counties East League Premier Division	-	15th/20	PR	-	2QR	
2002–03	Northern Counties East League Premier Division	-	14th/20	PR	-	1R	
2003–04	Northern Counties East League Premier Division	-	20th/20	EPR	-	1QR	
2004–05	Northern Counties East League Premier Division	9	17th/20	EPR	-	2QR	
2005–06	Northern Counties East League Premier Division	9	20th/20	PR	-	1R	
Changed name to Brodsworth Welfare (2006)
2006–07	Northern Counties East League Premier Division	9	20th/20	PR	-	2QR	
2007–08	Northern Counties East League Premier Division	9	13th/20	EPR	-	2QR	
2008–09	Northern Counties East League Premier Division	9	19th/20	PR	-	2R	
2009–10	Northern Counties East League Premier Division	9	20th/20	-	-	-	Relegated
2010–11	Northern Counties East League Division 1	10	20th/20	-	-	1QR	Relegated
2011–12	Doncaster & District Senior League Premier Division	14	7th/14	-	-	-	Transferred
2012–13	Central Midlands League North Division	11	12th/17	-	-	-	
2013–14	Central Midlands League North Division	11	13th/17	-	-	-	
2014–15	Central Midlands League North Division	11	11th/18	-	-	-	
2015–16	Central Midlands League North Division	11	9th/15	-	-	-	Transferred
2016–17	Doncaster & District Senior League Division 1	15	2nd/8	-	-	-	Transferred
2017–18	Central Midlands League North Division	11	16th/18	-	-	-	Transferred
Changed name to Brodsworth Main (2018)
2018–19	Doncaster & District Senior League Division 1	15	1st/5	-	-	-	
Reformed as Brodsworth Welfare (2022)
2022–23	Doncaster & District Senior League Premier Division	14	8th/11	-	-	-	
2023–24	Doncaster & District Senior League Premier Division	14	10th/10	-	-	-	Relegated
2024–25	Doncaster & District Senior League Division One	15	3rd/9	-	-	-	Transferred
Changed name to Brodsworth Main (2025)
2025–26	Central Midlands League North Division	11	4th/16	-	-	-	
Season	Division	Level	Position	FA Cup	FA Amateur Cup	FA Vase	Notes
Source: Football Club History Database

=== Notable former players ===
Players that have played in the Football League either before or after playing for Brodsworth Welfare –

- Mick Carmody
- Craig Nelthorpe
- Danny Schofield
- David Speedie
- Fred Thompson
- Harry Wainwright
- Colin Bishop

=== Notable managers ===
- Alan Radford
- Joe Yorke
- Colin Bishop – Managed the club in a Sheffield & Hallamshire Senior Cup final at Hillsborough against Stocksbridge

== Key Milestones and Legacy ==
Over the course of its long timeline, Brodsworth Welfare AFC has accumulated many milestones:

- 1908 – Founding year: Brodsworth starts its story in the South Yorkshire Football League
- 1910 - Brodsworth Main plays its first matches in the Sheffield League.
- 1924–25 – First major honor: Yorkshire League Champions.
- 1927 – Historic cup run: Reaches the 4th Qualifying Round of the FA Cup (just one round short of the FA Cup proper).
- 1935 – Hiatus: Withdraws from Yorkshire League; focuses on local competition until after WWII.
- 1947 – Post-war revival: Re-enters Yorkshire League for a third spell.
- 1963 – Name change: Becomes Brodsworth Miners Welfare to reflect the Miners Welfare support.
- 1976 – Yorkshire League exit: Leaves the Yorkshire League, ending an era in that competition.
- 1985 – Local triumph: Wins the Doncaster Senior League Premier Division (first local league title since pre-war).
- 1988 – Joins NCEL: Steps up to Northern Counties East League, marking a return to higher-tier football.
- 1999 – Promotion: Finishes 2nd in NCEL Division One and earns promotion to the NCEL Premier Division.
- 2006 – Name update: Changes name to Brodsworth Welfare AFC, dropping “Miners”.
- 2006 – Record attendance: 1,251 fans attend an FA Vase match vs FC United of Manchester at the Welfare Ground.
- 2008–09 – Cup final: Reaches the Sheffield & Hallamshire Senior Cup final (runners-up).
- 2010 – Relegation: Relegated from NCEL Premier Division after years of near-misses.
- 2011 – Resignation: Club resigns from NCEL and folds due to financial difficulties and lack of wins.
- 2012 – Reformation: Adwick Park Rangers assumes the Brodsworth Welfare name; club joins Central Midlands League to restart climb.
- 2015 – Facility upgrade: refurbished Changingrooms opened at Welfare Ground, funded by grants (Olympic legacy).
- 2016 – Eviction: Club loses access to Welfare Ground; merges with Bentley Colliery’s setup and is renamed AFC Bentley.
- 2017 – Cup victory: Brodsworth (as a junior-based team) wins Doncaster League Division One Cup, keeping the name alive.
- 2018 – Return of “Main”: Club is re-launched as Brodsworth Main FC, hinting at a fresh start yet rooted in tradition.
- 2020 – COVID setback: Brodsworth Main’s season abandoned; club dissolves again amidst the pandemic disruptions.
- 2022 – Resurrection: Brodsworth Welfare AFC is reborn, returning to its home ground and community focus.
- 2023 – Youth merger: Integration of Adwick Warriors junior teams, massively expanding the club’s youth section.
- 2024 – Women’s team: Launch of Brodsworth Welfare Ladies, marking the club’s second venture into women’s football.
- 2025 - Brodsworth Welfare AFC Merge with Hatfield Town FC to form Brodsworth Main FC - returnig to the clubs original Name
- 2026 - Brodsworth Main FC Ladies XI Enter the women's FA cup for the first time in the clubs history.

== Ground ==
Brodsworth Welfare plays at the Welfare Ground in Woodlands, Doncaster. The ground includes a main stand (in place before the 1990s), floodlights installed in 1998, and a covered disabled viewing area added around 2006. The current clubhouse was built following a fire around 2011, and the facilities are regularly used for both football and wider community events. 2025 has seen renovations to the ground being made under new leadership with the addition of a bar, a club house renovation, new exterior fencing and new turnstiles in the pipe line.

=== Gallery ===
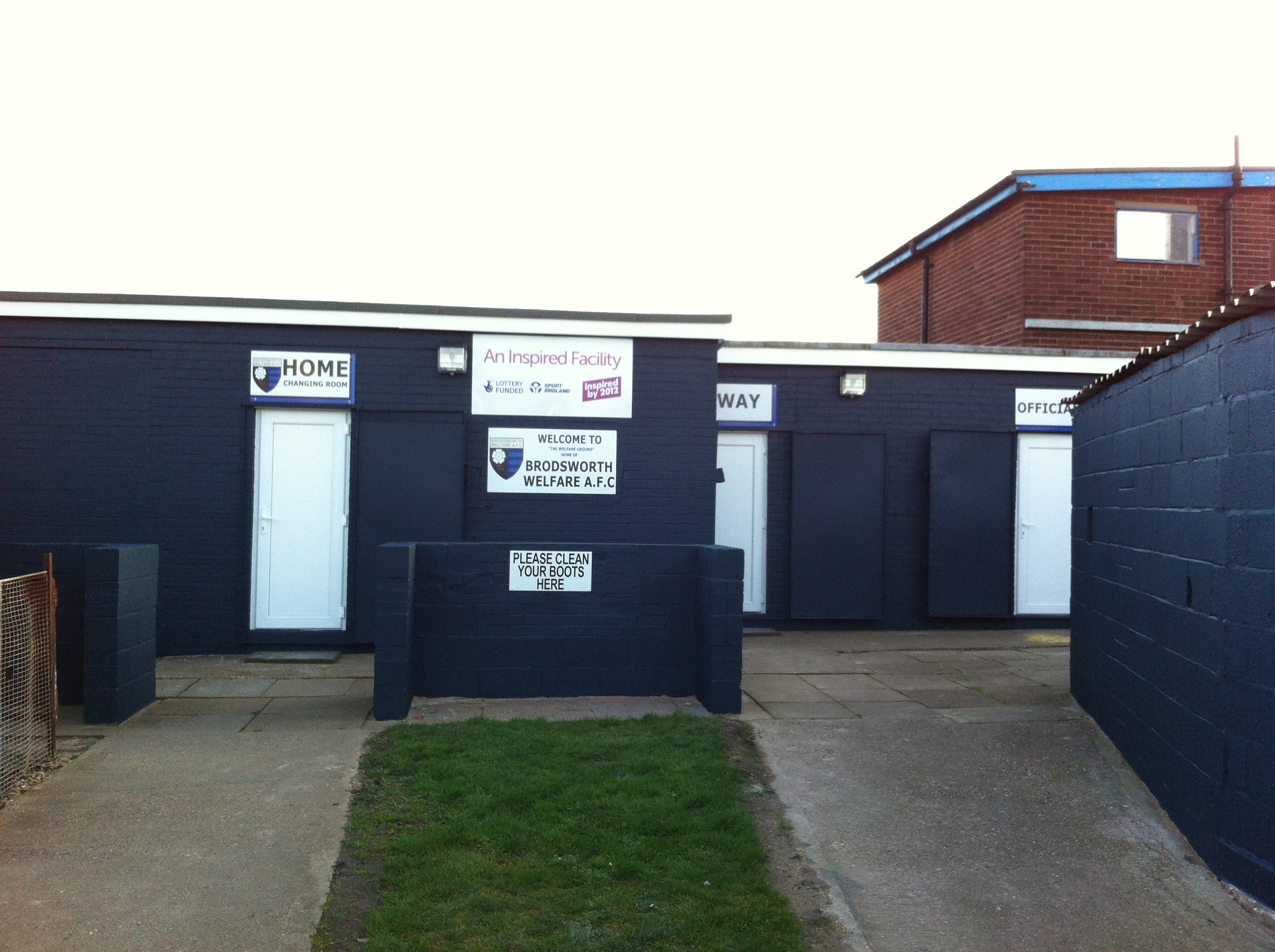
View of Changing Rooms from pitch entry/exit point.

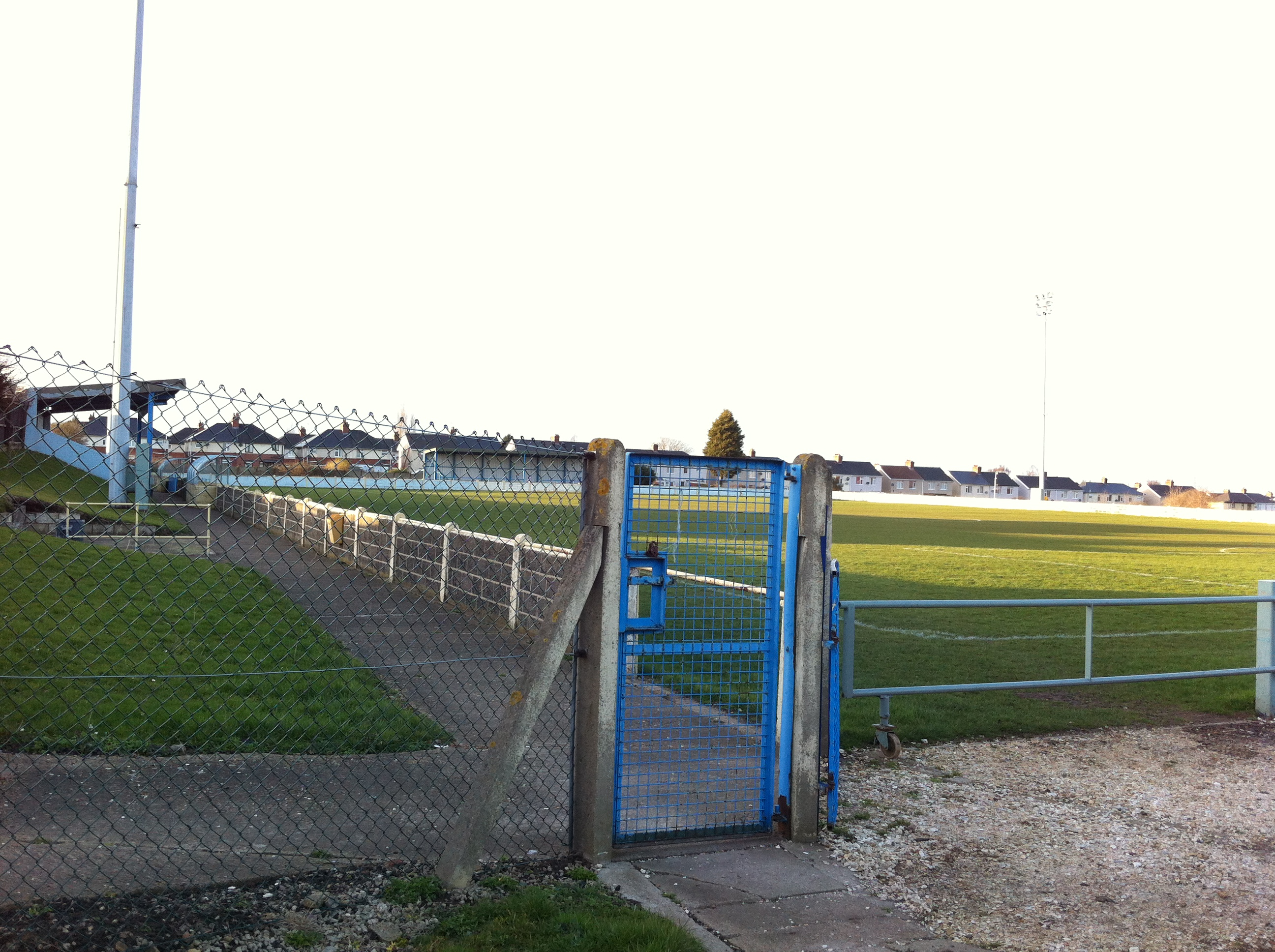
View of pitch from changing rooms.

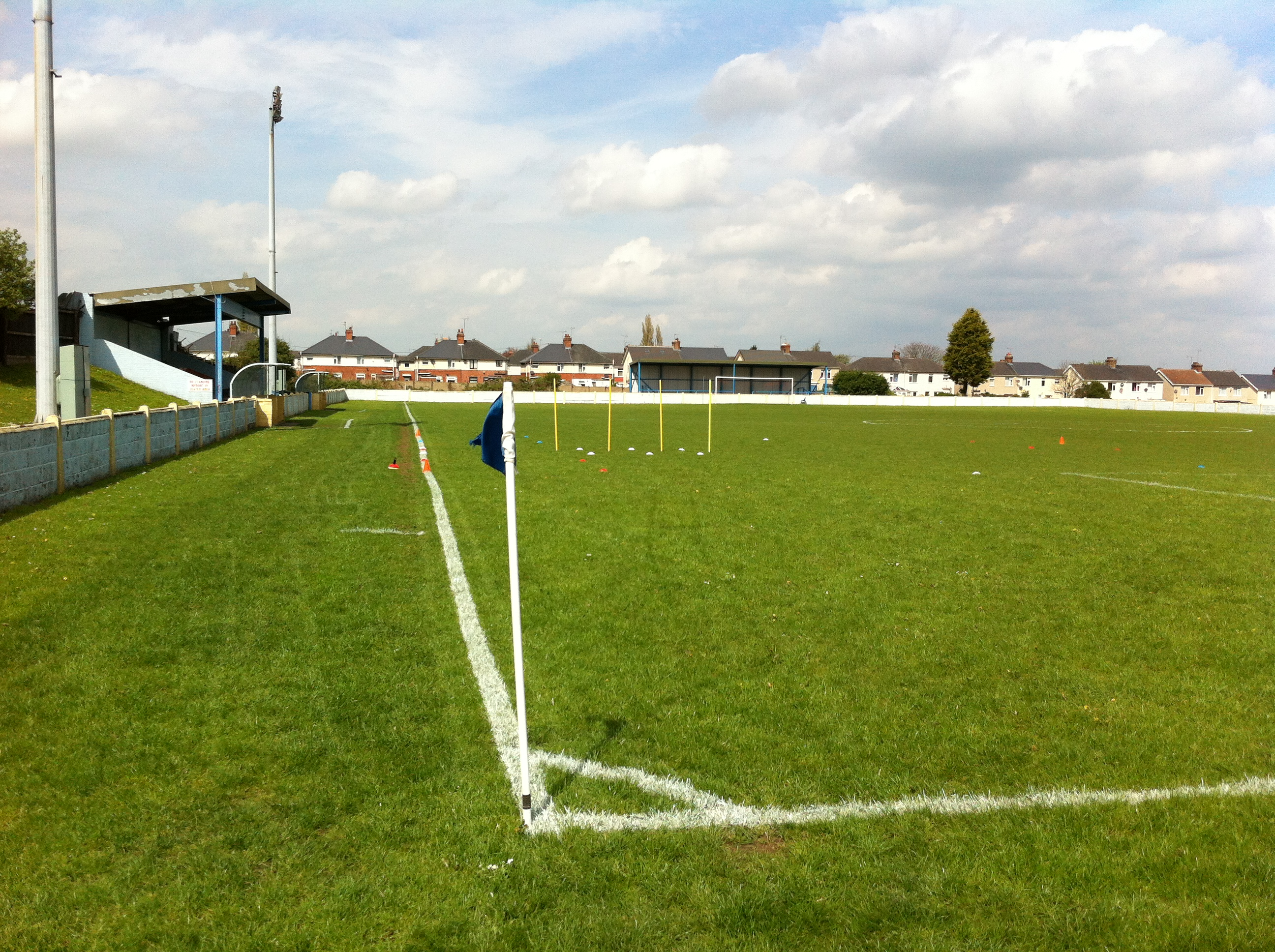
View of pitch from Welfare Road end towards Princess Street Stand.

Inside view of new clubhouse

== Honours ==
=== League ===
- Yorkshire League
  - Champions: 1924–25
- Yorkshire League Division Two
  - Promoted: 1963–64
- Northern Counties East League Division One
  - Promoted: 1998–99
- Doncaster and District Senior League Premier Division
  - Promoted: 1984–85
- Doncaster and District Senior League Division One
  - Promoted: 1983–84 (champions)

=== Cup ===
- Sheffield and Hallamshire Senior Cup
  - Runners-up: 2008–09

== Records ==
- Best FA Cup performance: (Men) 4th qualifying round, 1926–27 (Women) 2nd Round Qualifying V Doncaster Belle's (Match not played yet) 2026-27
- Best FA Amateur Cup performance: 3rd qualifying round, 1957–58
- Best FA Vase performance: 2nd Round, 1997–98, 2008–09
- Record attendance: 1,251 vs. FC United of Manchester, FA Vase, 2006–07
