= Darren Davis (footballer) =

English footballer (born 1967)

Personal information
- Date of birth: 5 February 1967 (age 59)
- Place of birth: Sutton-in-Ashfield, England
- Height: 6 ft 0 in (1.83 m)
- Position: Defender

Senior career*
Years	Team	Apps	(Gls)
1983–1988	Notts County	92	(1)
1988–1990	Lincoln City	102	(4)
1990–1992	Maidstone United	31	(2)
1992–1993	Boston United	9	(0)
1993	Frickley Athletic		
1993–1995	Scarborough	48	(3)
1995	Grantham Town		
1996	Lincoln City	3	(0)
- VS Rugby
- Hucknall Town

International career
1984	England Youth	2	(0)
- * Club domestic league appearances and goals

Darren Davis (born 5 February 1967) is an English former professional footballer who played for Maidstone United, Notts County, Lincoln City and Scarborough.

In June 2002 he was appointed manager of Gedling Town. He later became assistant manager of the Notts County's Centre of Excellence.
