= Garforth Town A.F.C. =

English football club

Coordinates: 53°47′56″N 1°21′44″W

Garforth Town
- Full name: Garforth Town Association Football Club
- Nickname: The Miners
- Founded: 1964
- Ground: Wheatley Park, Garforth
- Capacity: 3,000 (278 seated)
- Chairman: Andy Hey
- Manager: Paul Marshall
- League: Northern Premier League Division One East
- 2025–26: Northern Premier League Division One East, 9th of 22
- Website: garforth.town
Home colours	Away colours

Garforth Town Association Football Club is a football club based in Garforth, West Yorkshire, England. They are members of the Northern Premier League Division One East and play at Wheatley Park.

== History ==
The club was established in 1964 as Miners Arms, a Sunday league team based at the pub from which they took their name. They joined the Elmet Sunday League, where they played until joining the Leeds Sunday Combination in 1972. In 1976 the club switched to Saturday football, joining the West Yorkshire League. They applied to join the Yorkshire League for the following season, and after being advised that pub teams were not allowed in the league, adopted the name Garforth Miners.

In 1978 Garforth were elected to Division Three of the Yorkshire League. They finished second-from-bottom of the table in their first season, but were Division Three runners-up in 1979–80, earning promotion to Division Two. When the league merged with the Midland League in 1982 to form the Northern Counties East League, the club were placed in Division One North. In 1985 they were renamed again, becoming Garforth Town. League reorganisation saw them placed in Division Two in 1985 and they went on to finish as runners-up, earning promotion to Division One. Although they were Division One runners-up in 1996–97, also winning the League Trophy, the club were not promoted to the Premier Division. However, they were Division One champions the following season, and were promoted. They also won the West Riding County Cup for the first time with a 1–0 win over Liversedge in the final. In 1999–2000 they both won the League Cup (beating Glapwell 3–1 in the final) and the West Riding County Cup (winning 2–0 against Eccleshill United in the final).

Garforth finished bottom of the Premier Division in 2001–02, but avoided relegation after Denaby United folded. However, the following season saw them finish bottom again, and they were relegated to Division One. In 2003 the club were taken over by Simon Clifford, who stated that his ambition was to take the club into the Football League. He took over as manager early in the 2004–05 season and made several high-profile signings, including Brazilian Sócrates (who made one appearance as a substitute) and Lee Sharpe. They finished as Division One runners-up, earning promotion back to the Premier Division. Another Brazilian, Careca, played for the club in a friendly that summer. In 2006–07 a fourth-place finish was enough to earn promotion to Division One North of the Northern Premier League.

In 2008–09 Garforth won the West Riding County Cup for a third time, beating Bradford Park Avenue in the final. They retained the cup the following season, defeating Barnoldswick Town in the final. In 2011–12 they finished fifth, qualifying for the promotion play-offs, but lost 4–1 on penalties to Curzon Ashton in the semi-finals after a 2–2 draw. They were bought by former Southampton chairman Rupert Lowe in December 2012, but the 2012–13 season saw the club finish bottom of Division One North, resulting in relegation back to the Northern Counties East League. Lowe left the club in 2015.

In 2023–24 Garforth finished third in the Premier Division. In the subsequent play-offs they defeated Rossington Main on penalties in the semi-final and then beat Albion Sports on penalties in the final, earning promotion to Division One East of the Northern Premier League.

== Ground ==
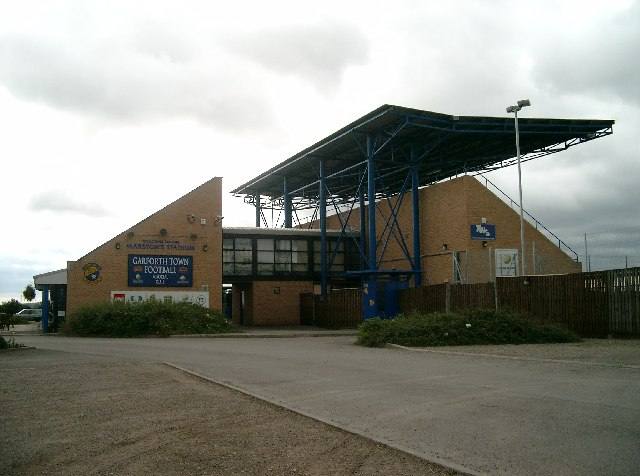
Wheatley Park

The club initially played on a council pitch in nearby Swillington as there were no facilities available in Garforth. When they joined the West Yorkshire League in 1976 they bought land at Brierlands Lane, a former council rubbish dump, to build a new ground. A clubhouse was built in 1991 and floodlights erected in 1995.

In 1998 they moved to Wheatley Park. The ground has a capacity of 3,000, of which 278 is seated and 200 covered. The record attendance of 2,428 was set for a Northern Premier League Division One North match against Chester on 29 April 2011.

== Honours ==
- Northern Counties East League
  - Division One champions 1997–98
  - League Cup winners 1999–2000
  - League Trophy winners 1996–97
- West Riding County Cup
  - Winners 1997–98, 1999–2000, 2008–09, 2009–10

== Records ==
- Best FA Cup performance: Second qualifying round, 1991–92, 1997–98, 2008–09
- Best FA Trophy performance: First qualifying round, 2008–09, 2009–10, 2010–11, 2011–12, 2025–26
- Best FA Vase performance: Quarter-finals, 1985–86
- Record attendance: 2,428 vs Chester, Northern Premier League Division One North, 29 April 2011
- Most appearances: Philip Matthews, 1982–1993
- Most goals: Mark Simpson

== See also ==
- Garforth Town A.F.C. players
- Garforth Town A.F.C. managers
