= Sutton Town A.F.C. =

English former football club, based in Sutton-in-Ashfield, Nottinghamshire

Coordinates: 53°07′32.93″N 1°17′21.79″W

Sutton Town
- Full name: Sutton Town Association Football Club
- Nickname: The Snipes
- Founded: 2007; 18 years ago
- Dissolved: 2014; 11 years ago
- Ground: The Fieldings; Sutton-in-Ashfield
- Chairman: (England) Tim Naylor
- Manager: (England) Dean Short
- 2013–14: East Midlands Counties League, 8th (resigned)
Home colours

Sutton Town A.F.C. was a football club based in Sutton-in-Ashfield, Nottinghamshire, England. The previous club was a member of the Northern Counties East League Premier Division until 2007 when they resigned, but the new club joined the Central Midlands League Premier Division, three levels lower in the English football league system, and later played in the East Midlands Counties League. The team was reformed in 2020, and was initially accepted into the Notts Senior league, but they never started the seasons fixtures. They then began playing friendlies in Spring 2021 ahead of again joining the Notts Senior League. They played against Nottinghamshire, Nuthall AFC, Trent Vineyard and Rushcliffe Reserves although the results were not made public.

== History ==
=== Previous club ===
A previous club called Sutton Town existed until 1997. They played in the Northern Counties East League. They also spent time in the Midland Football League and the Northern Premier League. They were regular competitors in the Nottinghamshire Senior Cup. They still hold the joint record for most cup wins, along with Nottingham Forest. They were based at Priestsic Road in Sutton-in-Ashfield. Following the loss of the ground for the building of a supermarket, they moved to Lowmoor Road in the neighbouring town of Kirkby-in-Ashfield. They changed their name to Ashfield United because of a sponsorship deal with Ashfield District Council, however the club folded in 1997. This club was also nicknamed The Snipes.

Another now defunct club (1996), Oakham United, based close to the King's Mill Hospital on the boundary between Sutton and Mansfield, applied to change their name to Sutton Town when the previous club became defunct but were denied permission by the Nottinghamshire FA.

== Honours ==
- Northern Counties East League Division One
  - Champions 2004–05
- Central Midlands League Supreme Division
  - Runners-up 2002–03, 2009–10
- Central Midlands League Premier Division
  - Champions 2000–01

As reformed club

- Central Midlands League South Division
  - Champions 2012–13
- Nottinghamshire Senior Cup
  - Runners – up 2012–13

Central Midlands League Cup Winners 2008/09 (Manager – D. Bryant)

Central Midlands Floodlit Cup Runners-up 2008/09 (Manager – D. Bryant)

== Records ==
- FA Cup
  - First Qualifying Round 2003–04, 2004–05
- FA Vase
  - Second Round 2004–05, 2006–07
