= 2001–02 FA Cup qualifying rounds =

Tournament details
- Country: England; Scotland; Wales

The 2001–02 FA Cup qualifying rounds opened the 121st season of competition in England for 'The Football Association Challenge Cup' (FA Cup), the world's oldest association football single knockout competition. A total of 596 clubs were accepted for the competition, down six from the previous season’s 602.

The large number of clubs entering the tournament from lower down (Levels 5 through 10) in the English football pyramid meant that the competition started with six rounds of preliminary (2) and qualifying (4) knockouts for these non-League teams. Somerset Senior League and South Western Football League were the only level 10 leagues represented in the Cup, three clubs from the leagues were the lowest-ranked clubs in competition. The 32 winning teams from fourth round Qualifying progressed to the First round proper, where League teams tiered at Levels 3 and 4 entered the competition.

== Calendar ==
Round	Start date	Leagues entering at this round	New entries this round	Winners from previous round	Number of fixtures
Extra preliminary round	17 August 2001	Levels 8-10	24	none	12
Preliminary round	31 August 2001	Level 7	390	12	201
First qualifying round	14 September 2001	none	1	201	101
Second qualifying round	28 September 2001	Isthmian League; Northern Premier League; Southern Football League (Premier divisions)	67	101	84
Third qualifying round	12 October 2001	none	none	84	42
Fourth qualifying round	26 October 2001	Football Conference	22	42	32

== Extra preliminary round ==
Matches played on weekend of Saturday 18 August 2001. 24 clubs from Level 8 and Level 9 of English football, entered at this stage of the competition, while other 303 clubs from levels 8-10 get a bye to the next rounds.

Tie	Home team (tier)	Score	Away team (tier)
1	Newcastle Blue Star (8)	5–0	Hebburn Town (9)
2	Prescot Cables (8)	2–4	Salford City (8)
3	Brigg Town (8)	2–2	Great Harwood Town (8)
replay	Great Harwood Town (8)	0–1	Brigg Town (8)
4	Brandon United (8)	3–2	St Helens Town (8)
5	Clitheroe (8)	1–3	Rossington Main (9)
6	Flixton (8)	0–0	Maine Road (8)
replay	Maine Road (8)	2–0	Flixton (8)

Tie	Home team (tier)	Score	Away team (tier)
7	Marske United (8)	8–1	Abbey Hey (8)
8	Lymington & New Milton (8)	0–6	Burgess Hill Town (8)
9	Slade Green (8)	5–1	Chipstead (8)
10	Saltdean United (8)	3–3	Walton Casuals (8)
replay	Walton Casuals (8)	7–0	Saltdean United (8)
11	Ramsgate (8)	2–1	AFC Newbury (8)
12	Street (9)	1–2	Frome Town (9)

== Preliminary round ==
Matches played on weekend of Saturday 1 September 2001. A total of 402 clubs took part in this stage of the competition, including the 12 winners from the extra preliminary round, 302 clubs from Levels 8-10, who get a bye in the extra preliminary round and 88 entering at this stage from the four divisions at Level 7 of English football. The round featured three clubs from Level 10: Falmouth Town and St Blazey from the South Western Football League and Clevedon United from the Somerset Senior League, being the lowest ranked clubs in this round.

Tie	Home team (tier)	Score	Away team (tier)
1	Warrington Town (8)	0–0	Ashington (8)
replay	Ashington (8)	3–0	Warrington Town (8)
2	Spennymoor United (7)	4–2	Mossley (8)
3	Hatfield Main (9)	0–2	Salford City (8)
4	Eccleshill United (8)	3–1	Chester-le-Street Town (8)
5	Woodley Sports (8)	1–2	Gretna (7)
6	Yorkshire Amateur (9)	3–6	Shildon (9)
7	Ossett Town (7)	5–1	Tadcaster Albion (9)
8	Curzon Ashton (8)	3–4	Louth United (9)
9	Guisborough Town (8)	1–0	Bacup Borough (9)
10	Esh Winning (9)	0–3	Ashton United (7)
11	West Auckland Town (8)	2–2	Harrogate Town (7)
replay	Harrogate Town (7)	4–1	West Auckland Town (8)
12	Horden Colliery Welfare (9)	2–0	Evenwood Town (9)
13	Northallerton Town (9)	0–3	Chorley (7)
14	Shotton Comrades (9)	1–5	Pickering Town (8)
15	Selby Town (8)	3–2	South Shields (9)
16	Rossington Main (9)	1–5	Stocksbridge Park Steels (7)
17	Marske United (8)	3–3	Maine Road (8)
replay	Maine Road (8)	0–0 (4–3 p)	Marske United (8)
18	Chadderton (9)	0–2	Maltby Main (9)
19	Billingham Synthonia (8)	4–2	Tow Law Town (8)
20	Squires Gate (9)	2–0	Oldham Town (9)
21	Brigg Town (8)	3–1	Morpeth Town (8)
22	Kendal Town (7)	4–0	Consett (8)
23	Farsley Celtic (7)	1–0	Trafford (7)
24	Radcliffe Borough (7)	3–3	Atherton Laburnum Rovers (8)
replay	Atherton Laburnum Rovers (8)	2–5	Radcliffe Borough (7)
25	Skelmersdale United (8)	2–0	Jarrow Roofing BCA (8)
26	Willington (9)	0–8	Durham City (8)
27	Sheffield (8)	1–1	Dunston Federation Brewery (8)
replay	Dunston Federation Brewery (8)	3–1	Sheffield (8)
28	Fleetwood Freeport (8)	4–0	Pontefract Collieries (9)
29	Blackpool Mechanics (9)	0–2	Ramsbottom United (8)
30	Witton Albion (7)	4–0	Atherton Collieries (8)
31	Workington (7)	1–0	Penrith (9)
32	Liversedge (8)	2–2	Darwen (9)
replay	Darwen (9)	0–1	Liversedge (8)
33	Garforth Town (8)	0–4	Rossendale United (7)
34	Parkgate (9)	3–3	Crook Town (9)
replay	Crook Town (9)	1–0	Parkgate (9)
35	Cheadle Town (9)	4–1	North Ferriby United (7)
36	Harrogate Railway Athletic (8)	2–0	Bridlington Town (9)
37	Peterlee Newtown (8)	4–0	Castleton Gabriels (9)
38	Hallam (8)	1–0	Armthorpe Welfare (8)
39	Easington Colliery (9)	4–3	Denaby United (8)
40	Glasshoughton Welfare (8)	0–2	Winsford United (8)
41	Seaham Red Star (8)	0–7	Brandon United (8)
42	Thornaby (8)	0–3	Billingham Town (8)
43	Ossett Albion (7)	0–3	Bedlington Terriers (8)
44	Newcastle Blue Star (8)	0–8	Whitley Bay (8)
45	Brodsworth Miners Welfare (8)	1–4	Guiseley (7)
46	Thackley (8)	1–0	Goole (8)
47	Buxton (8)	1–3	Atherstone United (7)
48	Borrowash Victoria (8)	2–2	Boston Town (8)
replay	Boston Town (8)	1–0	Borrowash Victoria (8)
49	Willenhall Town (8)	1–6	Solihull Borough (7)
50	Bourne Town (8)	1–2	Eastwood Town (7)
51	Belper Town (7)	1–0	Paget Rangers (8)
52	Pelsall Villa (8)	1–2	Knypersley Victoria (8)
53	Stafford Town (8)	5–0	Cradley Town (8)
54	Oadby Town (8)	0–3	Leek Town (7)
55	Blackstones (8)	0–1	Bromsgrove Rovers (8)
56	Mickleover Sports (9)	1–0	Stapenhill (8)
57	Matlock Town (7)	3–1	Holbeach United (8)
58	Bloxwich United (7)	0–2	Gresley Rovers (7)
59	Halesowen Harriers (8)	0–4	Redditch United (7)
60	Leek CSOB (9)	2–3	Nantwich Town (8)
Nantwich Town disqualified - opponents win the tie by default
61	Stamford (7)	3–2	Congleton Town (8)
62	Arnold Town (8)	4–1	Kidsgrove Athletic (8)
63	Corby Town (7)	1–2	Alfreton Town (8)
64	Bilston Town (7)	4–2	Gedling Town (9)
65	Halesowen Town (7)	2–0	Chasetown (8)
66	Grantham Town (7)	3–2	Glapwell (8)
67	Rocester (7)	2–1	Boldmere St Michaels (8)
68	Oldbury United (8)	0–4	Bedworth United (7)
69	Newcastle Town (8)	3–1	Shepshed Dynamo (7)
70	Glossop North End (8)	0–1	Stourbridge (8)
71	Shifnal Town (8)	0–4	Rushall Olympic (8)
72	Barwell (8)	2–0	Racing Club Warwick (7)
73	Stourport Swifts (7)	5–1	Rugby United (7)
74	Staveley Miners Welfare (9)	1–0	Stratford Town (8)
75	Bridgnorth Town (8)	2–3	Sutton Coldfield Town (7)
76	Lincoln United (7)	3–0	Spalding United (7)
77	Clacton Town (8)	2–1	Tiptree United (8)
78	Hullbridge Sports (9)	0–1	Concord Rangers (9)
79	Rothwell Town (7)	2–2	Hornchurch (9)
replay	Hornchurch (9)	2–0	Rothwell Town (7)
80	Burnham (7)	4–0	Flackwell Heath (9)
81	Northwood (7)	3–3	Bishop's Stortford (7)
replay	Bishop's Stortford (7)	0–1	Northwood (7)
82	Witham Town (9)	6–0	Saffron Walden Town (9)
83	AFC Wallingford (8)	1–2	Mildenhall Town (8)
84	Stotfold (8)	0–2	Harlow Town (7)
85	Potters Bar Town (8)	0–5	Staines Town (7)
86	Romford (8)	1–2	Southend Manor (9)
87	Wivenhoe Town (8)	0–2	Harwich & Parkeston (8)
88	Leyton (9)	2–1	Felixstowe & Walton United (8)
89	Wroxham (8)	2–1	Aveley (9)
90	Ford United (7)	3–2	Royston Town (8)
91	Maldon Town (8)	0–0	Buckingham Town (8)
replay	Buckingham Town (8)	2–4	Maldon Town (8)
92	Leighton Town (9)	1–4	Dunstable Town (8)
93	Aylesbury United (7)	10–1	Brentwood (9)
94	Long Buckby (8)	0–9	Berkhamsted Town (8)
95	London Colney (8)	1–2	Soham Town Rangers (8)
96	Wisbech Town (7)	3–2	Bowers United (9)
97	Woodbridge Town (8)	1–2	Diss Town (8)
98	Hertford Town (9)	3–1	Haringey Borough (8)
99	Kingsbury Town (9)	0–3	Wootton Blue Cross (8)
100	St Neots Town (8)	5–0	Northampton Spencer (8)
101	Wingate & Finchley (9)	0–0	Barking & East Ham United (7)
replay	Barking & East Ham United (7)	1–2	Wingate & Finchley (9)
102	Fakenham Town (8)	4–3	Marlow (8)
103	Yeading (7)	3–1	Ilford (9)

Tie	Home team (tier)	Score	Away team (tier)
104	Clapton (9)	0–5	Somersett Ambury V&E (8)
105	Beaconsfield SYCOB (8)	2–3	Brackley Town (8)
106	Hemel Hempstead Town (8)	4–0	Holmer Green (8)
107	Burnham Ramblers (9)	0–2	Leyton Pennant (8)
108	Bedford United (8)	0–1	Newmarket Town (8)
109	Southall (8)	1–11	Uxbridge (7)
110	St Margaretsbury (8)	3–1	Gorleston (8)
111	Tilbury (8)	1–1	Wealdstone (7)
replay	Wealdstone (7)	2–1	Tilbury (8)
112	Barton Rovers (8)	1–3	Cheshunt (8)
113	Bury Town (8)	1–2	Great Wakering Rovers (8)
114	Bugbrooke St Michaels (8)	0–0	Histon (7)
replay	Histon (7)	3–1	Bugbrooke St Michaels (8)
115	Tring Town (9)	0–2	Cogenhoe United (8)
116	Arlesey Town (8)	4–0	Chalfont St Peter (9)
117	Stowmarket Town (8)	4–3	Ruislip Manor (8)
118	Desborough Town (8)	1–2	Great Yarmouth Town (8)
119	Yaxley (8)	2–1	Raunds Town (8)
120	Banbury United (7)	4–0	Ware (9)
Banbury United disqualified - opponents win the tie by default
121	Hoddesdon Town (8)	6–1	Wellingborough Town (8)
122	Brook House (8)	2–1	Hanwell Town (8)
123	Ipswich Wanderers (8)	3–1	Kempston Rovers (8)
124	Lowestoft Town (8)	3–4	Wembley (8)
125	East Thurrock United (8)	3–0	Sawbridgeworth Town (9)
126	Milton Keynes City (8)	2–0	Edgware Town (9)
127	Ford Sports Daventry (8)	0–1	Stewart & Lloyds Corby (8)
128	Brockenhurst (8)	3–1	Three Bridges (8)
129	Fareham Town (8)	2–0	Chessington United (8)
130	Horsham (8)	2–0	Dulwich Hamlet (7)
131	Banstead Athletic (8)	0–2	Carshalton Athletic (7)
132	Fisher Athletic (7)	3–0	Ashford Town (Middx) (8)
133	Tooting & Mitcham United (7)	0–0	Burgess Hill Town (8)
replay	Burgess Hill Town (8)	1–3	Tooting & Mitcham United (7)
134	Walton Casuals (8)	0–4	Horsham YMCA (8)
135	Thamesmead Town (8)	1–1	Corinthian-Casuals (9)
replay	Corinthian-Casuals (9)	3–1	Thamesmead Town (8)
136	Walton & Hersham (7)	4–0	Slade Green (8)
137	Lordswood (8)	4–2	Hungerford Town (8)
138	Hastings Town (7)	3–0	Ringmer (8)
139	Whyteleafe (7)	2–0	Eastbourne United (8)
140	Greenwich Borough (8)	2–2	Cowes Sports (8)
replay	Cowes Sports (8)	0–3	Greenwich Borough (8)
141	Whitehawk (8)	2–2	Leatherhead (8)
replay	Leatherhead (8)	2–0	Whitehawk (8)
142	Chatham Town (7)	1–1	Moneyfields (8)
replay	Moneyfields (8)	4–0	Chatham Town (7)
143	Hillingdon Borough (8)	2–3	BAT Sports (8)
144	Egham Town (9)	3–0	Cobham (8)
145	Molesey (8)	2–1	Arundel (8)
146	Hassocks (8)	3–2	Ashford Town (Kent) (7)
147	Hailsham Town (8)	0–1	Peacehaven & Telscombe (8)
148	Tonbridge Angels (7)	4–1	AFC Totton (8)
149	VCD Athletic (8)	1–3	Chichester City United (8)
150	Dartford (7)	3–1	Eastbourne Town
151	Eastbourne Borough (7)	3–1	Whitchurch United (8)
152	Selsey (8)	0–2	Littlehampton Town (8)
153	Thame United (7)	3–2	Worthing (7)
154	Cove (8)	1–3	Erith & Belvedere (7)
155	Windsor & Eton (7)	3–1	Fleet Town (8)
156	Bracknell Town (9)	5–0	Reading Town (8)
157	Ramsgate (8)	0–4	Andover (8)
158	Croydon Athletic (9)	6–2	Erith Town (8)
159	Bedfont (8)	5–0	Epsom & Ewell (9)
160	Abingdon United (8)	2–1	Lancing (9)
161	Blackfield & Langley (8)	2–5	Chertsey Town (8)
162	Beckenham Town (8)	2–2	Dorking (9)
replay	Dorking (9)	1–0	Beckenham Town (8)
163	Metropolitan Police (8)	2–1	Carterton Town (8)
164	Wick (8)	2–2	Bashley (7)
replay	Bashley (7)	3–2	Wick (8)
165	Thatcham Town (8)	3–1	North Leigh (8)
166	Chessington & Hook United (8)	2–0	Didcot Town (8)
167	Whitstable Town (8)	4–0	Merstham (8)
168	Wokingham Town (9)	0–4	Sittingbourne (7)
169	Eastleigh (8)	2–2	Tunbridge Wells (8)
replay	Tunbridge Wells (8)	2–3	Eastleigh (8)
170	Ash United (8)	3–0	East Preston
171	Godalming & Guildford (8)	0–3	Gosport Borough (8)
172	Herne Bay (8)	0–2	St Leonards (7)
173	Bromley (7)	2–0	Pagham (8)
174	Hythe Town (8)	1–0	Camberley Town (9)
175	Cray Wanderers (8)	3–0	Southwick (8)
176	Torrington (9)	0–1	Elmore (8)
177	St Blazey (10)	4–2	Bishop Sutton (8)
178	Chard Town (9)	0–4	Evesham United (7)
179	Bournemouth (8)	3–1	Dorchester Town (7)
180	Frome Town (9)	2–0	Melksham Town (8)
181	Downton (8)	0–3	Falmouth Town (10)
182	Backwell United (8)	0–1	Christchurch (8)
183	Cinderford Town (7)	1–1	Bideford (8)
replay	Bideford (8)	3–1	Cinderford Town (7)
184	Swindon Supermarine (7)	1–1	Calne Town (9)
replay	Calne Town (9)	0–1	Swindon Supermarine (7)
185	Yate Town (8)	1–3	Shortwood United (8)
186	Mangotsfield United (7)	1–0	Clevedon Town (7)
187	Weston-super-Mare (7)	0–0	Taunton Town (8)
replay	Taunton Town (8)	1–3	Weston-super-Mare (7)
188	Cirencester Town (7)	2–1	Gloucester City (7)
189	Clevedon United (10)	3–3	Barnstaple Town (8)
replay	Barnstaple Town (8)	2–1	Clevedon United (10)
190	Highworth Town (8)	2–0	Welton Rovers (8)
191	Devizes Town (8)	0–3	Odd Down (8)
192	Minehead Town (9)	4–1	Bemerton Heath Harlequins (8)
193	Bridgwater Town (8)	0–0	Fairford Town (8)
replay	Fairford Town (8)	1–2	Bridgwater Town (8)
194	Brislington (8)	3–1	Paulton Rovers (8)
195	Tuffley Rovers (8)	2–5	Wimborne Town (8)
196	Westbury United (8)	1–4	Bristol Manor Farm (8)
197	Shepton Mallet (9)	1–1	Chippenham Town (7)
replay	Chippenham Town (7)	3–0	Shepton Mallet (9)
198	Redhill (8)	2–2	Oxford City (7)
replay	Oxford City (7)	4–0	Redhill (8)
199	Lewes (8)	3–0	Slough Town (7)
200	Sandhurst Town (8)	2–3	Deal Town (8)
201	Abingdon Town (9)	1–3	Bognor Regis Town (7)

== First qualifying round ==
Matches on weekend of 15 September 2001. A total of 202 clubs took part in this stage of the competition, 201 progressed from the preliminary round plus AFC Sudbury from the Eastern Counties Football League, who get a bye to this stage. Falmouth Town and St Blazey from the South Western Football League at Level 10 of English football were the lowest-ranked clubs to qualify for this round of the competition.

Tie	Home team (tier)	Score	Away team (tier)
1	Spennymoor United (7)	2–0	Cheadle Town (9)
2	Horden Colliery Welfare (9)	1–2	Witton Albion (7)
3	Stocksbridge Park Steels (7)	3–2	Easington Colliery (9)
4	Rossendale United (7)	3–2	Guisborough Town (8)
5	Dunston Federation Brewery (8)	3–1	Hallam (8)
6	Brandon United (8)	1–3	Kendal Town (7)
7	Louth United (9)	0–3	Durham City (8)
8	Squires Gate (9)	3–2	Ossett Town (7)
9	Crook Town (9)	1–1	Pickering Town (8)
replay	Pickering Town (8)	1–0	Crook Town (9)
10	Farsley Celtic (7)	3–1	Radcliffe Borough (7)
11	Ramsbottom United (8)	6–1	Ashington (8)
12	Chorley (7)	1–2	Maine Road (8)
13	Whitley Bay (8)	1–0	Workington (7)
14	Ashton United (7)	4–2	Skelmersdale United (8)
15	Billingham Synthonia (8)	0–2	Liversedge (8)
16	Selby Town (8)	0–2	Gretna (7)
17	Guiseley (7)	1–2	Eccleshill United (8)
18	Bedlington Terriers (8)	2–0	Peterlee Newtown (8)
19	Shildon (9)	2–8	Brigg Town (8)
20	Salford City (8)	2–3	Harrogate Town (7)
21	Billingham Town (8)	7–0	Fleetwood Freeport (8)
22	Thackley (8)	2–1	Maltby Main (9)
23	Harrogate Railway Athletic (8)	1–1	Winsford United (8)
replay	Winsford United (8)	1–4	Harrogate Railway Athletic (8)
24	Alfreton Town (8)	0–2	Newcastle Town (8)
25	Belper Town (7)	1–1	Leek Town (7)
replay	Leek Town (7)	1–2	Belper Town (7)
26	Matlock Town (7)	2–2	Bilston Town (7)
replay	Bilston Town (7)	4–2	Matlock Town (7)
27	Mickleover Sports (9)	1–2	Bromsgrove Rovers (8)
28	Halesowen Town (7)	2–0	Staveley Miners Welfare (9)
29	Arnold Town (8)	2–2	Rushall Olympic (8)
replay	Rushall Olympic (8)	0–3	Arnold Town (8)
30	Gresley Rovers (7)	1–1	Redditch United (7)
replay	Redditch United (7)	2–1	Gresley Rovers (7)
31	Stamford (7)	0–3	Grantham Town (7)
32	Lincoln United (7)	3–3	Stourport Swifts (7)
replay	Stourport Swifts (7)	1–0	Lincoln United (7)
33	Rocester (7)	1–2	Barwell (8)
34	Atherstone United (7)	1–1	Bedworth United (7)
replay	Bedworth United (7)	0–1	Atherstone United (7)
35	Stourbridge (8)	3–2	Knypersley Victoria (8)
36	Solihull Borough (7)	4–1	Sutton Coldfield Town (7)
37	Stafford Town (8)	2–1	Boston Town (8)
38	Eastwood Town (7)	5–0	Leek CSOB (9)
39	Great Yarmouth Town (8)	0–1	Hoddesdon Town (8)
40	Great Wakering Rovers (8)	2–3	Northwood (7)
41	Uxbridge (7)	0–3	Wroxham (8)
42	Hertford Town (9)	0–4	St Margaretsbury (8)
43	Mildenhall Town (8)	1–5	Wingate & Finchley (9)
44	Fakenham Town (8)	1–1	Leyton (9)
replay	Leyton (9)	3–0	Fakenham Town (8)
45	Southend Manor (9)	0–0	Diss Town (8)
replay	Diss Town (8)	1–2	Southend Manor (9)
46	Hornchurch (9)	1–3	Wisbech Town (7)
47	Wootton Blue Cross (8)	2–0	Harwich & Parkeston (8)
48	Somersett Ambury V&E (8)	3–0	Stewart & Lloyds Corby (8)
49	Ware (9)	1–5	Wealdstone (7)
50	Clacton Town (8)	3–0	Leyton Pennant (8)
51	St Neots Town (8)	0–2	Ipswich Wanderers (8)

Tie	Home team (tier)	Score	Away team (tier)
52	Burnham (7)	4–3	Soham Town Rangers (8)
53	Aylesbury United (7)	4–3	AFC Sudbury (8)
54	Brackley Town (8)	1–1	Ford United (7)
replay	Ford United (7)	4–2	Brackley Town (8)
55	Witham Town (9)	1–1	Harlow Town (7)
replay	Harlow Town (7)	7–2	Witham Town (9)
56	Concord Rangers (9)	1–2	Stowmarket Town (8)
57	Yeading (7)	1–1	Staines Town (7)
replay	Staines Town (7)	1–4	Yeading (7)
58	Dunstable Town (8)	1–1	Cogenhoe United (8)
replay	Cogenhoe United (8)	2–2 (2–4 p)	Dunstable Town (8)
59	Berkhamsted Town (8)	3–2	Brook House (8)
60	Wembley (8)	2–1	Maldon Town (8)
61	Arlesey Town (8)	2–0	Cheshunt (8)
62	Histon (7)	3–0	Yaxley (8)
63	Newmarket Town (8)	3–1	Hemel Hempstead Town (8)
64	East Thurrock United (8)	2–1	Milton Keynes City (8)
65	Chessington & Hook United (8)	2–5	Eastleigh (8)
66	Chertsey Town (8)	0–6	Fisher Athletic (7)
67	Oxford City (7)	2–0	Leatherhead (8)
68	Dartford (7)	1–1	Deal Town (8)
replay	Deal Town (8)	0–3	Dartford (7)
69	Horsham YMCA (8)	0–0	Thame United (7)
replay	Thame United (7)	2–0	Horsham YMCA (8)
70	Erith & Belvedere (7)	3–2	Greenwich Borough (8)
71	Hastings Town (7)	3–0	Chichester City United (8)
72	Horsham (8)	2–0	Tonbridge Angels (7)
73	Eastbourne Borough (7)	3–2	Whyteleafe (7)
74	Bracknell Town (9)	3–1	Cray Wanderers (8)
75	Sittingbourne (7)	1–1	Lewes (8)
replay	Lewes (8)	6–3	Sittingbourne (7)
76	Brockenhurst (8)	3–3	Bedfont (8)
replay	Bedfont (8)	2–3	Brockenhurst (8)
77	Littlehampton Town (8)	3–3	Gosport Borough (8)
replay	Gosport Borough (8)	3–0	Littlehampton Town (8)
78	Carshalton Athletic (7)	1–0	Peacehaven & Telscombe (8)
79	Molesey (8)	0–0	Walton & Hersham (7)
replay	Walton & Hersham (7)	0–1	Molesey (8)
80	Andover (8)	2–1	Moneyfields (8)
81	Tooting & Mitcham United (7)	0–2	Corinthian-Casuals (9)
82	Fareham Town (8)	2–1	Thatcham Town (8)
83	Windsor & Eton (7)	4–0	Lordswood (8)
84	Egham Town (9)	0–0	Metropolitan Police (8)
replay	Metropolitan Police (8)	1–1 (3–5 p)	Egham Town (9)
85	Hassocks (8)	1–1	Ash United (8)
replay	Ash United (8)	0–1	Hassocks (8)
86	St Leonards (7)	3–0	BAT Sports (8)
87	Bashley (7)	3–0	Bognor Regis Town (7)
88	Dorking (9)	1–2	Whitstable Town (8)
89	Abingdon United (8)	0–5	Croydon Athletic (9)
90	Bromley (7)	1–0	Hythe Town (8)
91	Christchurch (8)	2–0	Bristol Manor Farm (8)
92	Bideford (8)	1–0	Wimborne Town (8)
93	Chippenham Town (7)	3–0	Frome Town (9)
94	Elmore (8)	1–2	Swindon Supermarine (7)
95	Cirencester Town (7)	5–0	Bournemouth (8)
96	Evesham United (7)	1–3	Bridgwater Town (8)
97	Weston-super-Mare (7)	3–4	Mangotsfield United (7)
98	Falmouth Town (10)	2–1	Odd Down (8)
99	Highworth Town (8)	2–1	Brislington (8)
100	St Blazey (10)	5–0	Shortwood United (8)
101	Minehead Town (9)	0–2	Barnstaple Town (8)

== Second qualifying round ==
Matches played on weekend of 29 September 2001. A total of 168 clubs took part in this stage of the competition, including the 101 winners from the first qualifying round and 67 Level 6 clubs, from Premier divisions of the Isthmian League, Northern Premier League and Southern Football League, entering at this stage. The round featured St Blazey and Falmouth Town from the South Western Football League, being the lowest ranked clubs in this round. Also, eight clubs from Level 9 divisions were still in the competition.

Tie	Home team (tier)	Score	Away team (tier)
1	Blyth Spartans (6)	5–0	Eccleshill United (8)
2	Barrow (6)	3–0	Kendal Town (7)
3	Maine Road (8)	0–2	Marine (6)
4	Durham City (8)	0–0	Lancaster City (6)
replay	Lancaster City (6)	2–1	Durham City (8)
5	Spennymoor United (7)	6–1	Billingham Town (8)
6	Gretna (7)	3–3	Brigg Town (8)
replay	Brigg Town (8)	2–1	Gretna (7)
7	Witton Albion (7)	4–2	Whitley Bay (8)
8	Gainsborough Trinity (6)	5–1	Dunston Federation Brewery (8)
9	Whitby Town (6)	5–2	Ramsbottom United (8)
10	Emley (6)	1–0	Bamber Bridge (6)
11	Vauxhall Motors (6)	2–1	Hyde United (6)
12	Worksop Town (6)	3–1	Bishop Auckland (6)
13	Gateshead (6)	2–4	Runcorn Halton (6)
14	Ashton United (7)	1–1	Stocksbridge Park Steels (7)
replay	Stocksbridge Park Steels (7)	2–1	Ashton United (7)
15	Harrogate Town (7)	1–1	Burscough (6)
replay	Burscough (6)	2–2 (4–5 p)	Harrogate Town (7)
16	Liversedge (8)	3–3	Harrogate Railway Athletic (8)
replay	Harrogate Railway Athletic (8)	2–1	Liversedge (8)
17	Thackley (8)	0–3	Rossendale United (7)
18	Squires Gate (9)	2–2	Bedlington Terriers (8)
replay	Bedlington Terriers (8)	4–0	Squires Gate (9)
19	Pickering Town (8)	1–2	Accrington Stanley (6)
20	Bradford Park Avenue (6)	3–2	Droylsden (6)
21	Colwyn Bay (6)	2–2	Farsley Celtic (7)
replay	Farsley Celtic (7)	3–1	Colwyn Bay (6)
22	Altrincham (6)	4–1	Frickley Athletic (6)
23	Redditch United (7)	0–0	Kettering Town (6)
replay	Kettering Town (6)	2–0	Redditch United (7)
24	Grantham Town (7)	2–1	Ilkeston Town (6)
25	Moor Green (6)	0–2	Halesowen Town (7)
26	Newcastle Town (8)	0–1	Stafford Rangers (6)
27	Stourport Swifts (7)	2–0	Solihull Borough (7)
28	Bromsgrove Rovers (8)	2–2	Tamworth (6)
replay	Tamworth (6)	1–0	Bromsgrove Rovers (8)
29	Bilston Town (7)	1–3	Hinckley United (6)
30	Stourbridge (8)	0–2	Atherstone United (7)
31	Arnold Town (8)	1–1	Burton Albion (6)
replay	Burton Albion (6)	4–0	Arnold Town (8)
32	Eastwood Town (7)	0–1	Hucknall Town (6)
33	Belper Town (7)	2–1	Barwell (8)
34	Hednesford Town (6)	4–3	Stafford Town (8)
35	Boreham Wood (6)	2–2	Harlow Town (7)
replay	Harlow Town (7)	0–0 (4–2 p)	Boreham Wood (6)
36	Bedford Town (6)	3–0	Leyton (9)
37	Clacton Town (8)	3–2	Heybridge Swifts (6)
38	Southend Manor (9)	1–2	Hendon (6)
39	Hoddesdon Town (8)	0–2	Berkhamsted Town (8)
40	Ford United (7)	1–2	Yeading (7)
41	Northwood (7)	5–1	Ipswich Wanderers (8)

Tie	Home team (tier)	Score	Away team (tier)
42	Grays Athletic (6)	4–1	Wingate & Finchley (9)
43	Purfleet (6)	3–2	Wealdstone (7)
44	Chesham United (6)	2–0	East Thurrock United (8)
45	King's Lynn (6)	1–0	Harrow Borough (6)
46	St Albans City (6)	0–1	Billericay Town (6)
47	Hampton & Richmond Borough (6)	1–1	Hitchin Town (6)
replay	Hitchin Town (6)	2–1	Hampton & Richmond Borough (6)
48	Burnham (7)	1–3	Wroxham (8)
49	Dunstable Town (8)	2–3	Cambridge City (6)
50	Aylesbury United (7)	2–0	Arlesey Town (8)
51	Wembley (8)	1–4	St Margaretsbury (8)
52	Wisbech Town (7)	0–2	Stowmarket Town (8)
53	Wootton Blue Cross (8)	0–1	Histon (7)
54	Braintree Town (6)	0–1	Chelmsford City (6)
55	Canvey Island (6)	9–1	Somersett Ambury V&E (8)
56	Newmarket Town (8)	1–3	Enfield (6)
57	Lewes (8)	0–0	Gosport Borough (8)
replay	Gosport Borough (8)	0–2	Lewes (8)
58	Croydon Athletic (9)	2–2	Dartford (7)
replay	Dartford (7)	4–2	Croydon Athletic (9)
59	Windsor & Eton (7)	0–4	Oxford City (7)
60	Andover (8)	1–1	Bashley (7)
replay	Bashley (7)	0–2	Andover (8)
61	Basingstoke Town (6)	6–0	Corinthian-Casuals (9)
62	Bracknell Town (9)	1–3	Horsham (8)
63	Maidenhead United (6)	1–1	Aldershot Town (6)
replay	Aldershot Town (6)	1–0	Maidenhead United (6)
64	Brockenhurst (8)	2–1	Kingstonian (6)
65	Fareham Town (8)	1–1	Crawley Town (6)
replay	Crawley Town (6)	4–0	Fareham Town (8)
66	Hassocks (8)	2–0	Bromley (7)
67	Erith & Belvedere (7)	3–0	Whitstable Town (8)
68	Carshalton Athletic (7)	1–2	Croydon (6)
69	Thame United (7)	3–4	Havant & Waterlooville (6)
70	Welling United (6)	1–0	Egham Town (9)
71	Sutton United (6)	5–1	Eastleigh (8)
72	Molesey (8)	1–3	Folkestone Invicta (6)
73	Fisher Athletic (7)	3–1	St Leonards (7)
74	Gravesend & Northfleet (6)	1–0	Eastbourne Borough (7)
75	Hastings Town (7)	0–2	Newport (Isle of Wight) (6)
76	Christchurch (8)	1–3	Cirencester Town (7)
77	Salisbury City (6)	3–3	Tiverton Town (6)
replay	Tiverton Town (6)	3–1	Salisbury City (6)
78	Bath City (6)	1–3	Bideford (8)
79	Merthyr Tydfil (6)	4–1	Bridgwater Town (8)
80	Barnstaple Town (8)	0–5	Worcester City (6)
81	Mangotsfield United (7)	10–1	Falmouth Town (10)
82	Highworth Town (8)	0–3	Weymouth (6)
83	St Blazey (10)	3–1	Chippenham Town (7)
84	Swindon Supermarine (7)	1–1	Newport County (6)
replay	Newport County (6)	3–1	Swindon Supermarine (7)

== Third qualifying round ==
Matches on weekend of 13 October 2001. A total of 84 clubs took part, all having progressed from the second qualifying round. St Blazey from the South Western Football League at Level 10 of English football was the lowest-ranked club to qualify for this round of the competition.

Tie	Home team (tier)	Score	Away team (tier)
1	Farsley Celtic (7)	2–2	Brigg Town (8)
replay	Brigg Town (8)	4–3	Farsley Celtic (7)
2	Vauxhall Motors (6)	3–1	Harrogate Town (7)
3	Lancaster City (6)	2–1	Stocksbridge Park Steels (7)
4	Emley (6)	1–0	Accrington Stanley (6)
5	Worksop Town (6)	4–0	Gainsborough Trinity (6)
6	Altrincham (6)	4–1	Witton Albion (7)
7	Barrow (6)	1–1	Rossendale United (7)
replay	Rossendale United (7)	3–3 (3–5 p)	Barrow (6)
8	Whitby Town (6)	3–0	Spennymoor United (7)
9	Runcorn Halton (6)	2–2	Bedlington Terriers (8)
replay	Bedlington Terriers (8)	4–1	Runcorn Halton (6)
10	Marine (6)	4–2	Bradford Park Avenue (6)
11	Blyth Spartans (6)	1–2	Harrogate Railway Athletic (8)
12	Chesham United (6)	0–1	Cambridge City (6)
13	King's Lynn (6)	3–2	Clacton Town (8)
14	Halesowen Town (7)	0–2	Canvey Island (6)
15	St Margaretsbury (8)	0–3	Stafford Rangers (6)
16	Belper Town (7)	2–0	Stowmarket Town (8)
17	Bedford Town (6)	2–1	Hednesford Town (6)
18	Burton Albion (6)	2–0	Berkhamsted Town (8)
19	Enfield (6)	3–4	Yeading (7)
20	Hucknall Town (6)	2–0	Stourport Swifts (7)
21	Billericay Town (6)	2–1	Grantham Town (7)
22	Kettering Town (6)	3–0	Northwood (7)

Tie	Home team (tier)	Score	Away team (tier)
23	Hendon (6)	0–0	Hitchin Town (6)
replay	Hitchin Town (6)	3–1	Hendon (6)
24	Tamworth (6)	3–1	Wroxham (8)
25	Aylesbury United (7)	3–1	Atherstone United (7)
26	Chelmsford City (6)	1–1	Harlow Town (7)
replay	Harlow Town (7)	3–0	Chelmsford City (6)
27	Purfleet (6)	1–1	Grays Athletic (6)
replay	Grays Athletic (6)	3–2	Purfleet (6)
28	Histon (7)	3–3	Hinckley United (6)
replay	Hinckley United (6)	2–0	Histon (7)
29	Aldershot Town (6)	3–0	Sutton United (6)
30	Basingstoke Town (6)	3–1	Bideford (8)
31	Merthyr Tydfil (6)	3–3	Mangotsfield United (7)
replay	Mangotsfield United (7)	4–1	Merthyr Tydfil (6)
32	Welling United (6)	3–0	Newport (Isle of Wight) (6)
33	Horsham (8)	1–2	Folkestone Invicta (6)
34	Fisher Athletic (7)	4–0	Erith & Belvedere (7)
35	Andover (8)	0–4	Newport County (6)
36	Dartford (7)	0–2	Gravesend & Northfleet (6)
37	Cirencester Town (7)	2–0	Brockenhurst (8)
38	Croydon (6)	0–1	Havant & Waterlooville (6)
39	Weymouth (6)	3–1	Crawley Town (6)
40	Lewes (8)	3–1	Hassocks (8)
41	St Blazey (10)	2–3	Worcester City (6)
42	Tiverton Town (6)	3–1	Oxford City (7)

== Fourth qualifying round ==
Matches played on weekend of Saturday 27 October 2001. A total of 64 clubs took part, 42 having progressed from the third qualifying round and 22 clubs from Football Conference, forming Level 5 of English football, entering at this stage. The round featured four clubs from Level 8 still in the competition, being the lowest ranked clubs in this round.

Tie	Home team (tier)	Score	Away team (tier)
1	Stalybridge Celtic (5)	2–1	Bedlington Terriers (8)
2	Harrogate Railway Athletic (8)	2–3	Morecambe (5)
3	Telford United (5)	1–1	Northwich Victoria (5)
replay	Northwich Victoria (5)	2–1	Telford United (5)
4	Doncaster Rovers (5)	3–2	Emley (6)
5	Boston United (5)	0–1	Brigg Town (8)
6	Leigh RMI (5)	2–4	Worksop Town (6)
7	Barrow (6)	1–0	Chester City (5)
8	Altrincham (6)	3–0	Nuneaton Borough (5)
9	Marine (6)	1–1	Southport (5)
replay	Southport (5)	2–1	Marine (6)
10	Whitby Town (6)	3–1	Scarborough (5)
11	Lancaster City (6)	2–2	Vauxhall Motors (6)
replay	Vauxhall Motors (6)	0–1	Lancaster City (6)
12	King's Lynn (6)	0–4	Farnborough Town (5)
13	Dover Athletic (5)	0–1	Hereford United (5)
14	Harlow Town (7)	1–2	Bedford Town (6)
15	Havant & Waterlooville (6)	1–1	Barnet (5)
replay	Barnet (5)	3–0	Havant & Waterlooville (6)
16	Grays Athletic (6)	2–0	Margate (5)
17	Belper Town (7)	2–2	Worcester City (6)
replay	Worcester City (6)	3–1	Belper Town (7)

Tie	Home team (tier)	Score	Away team (tier)
18	Yeading (7)	0–5	Aylesbury United (7)
19	Hayes (5)	3–1	Yeovil Town (5)
20	Hucknall Town (6)	1–1	Cambridge City (6)
replay	Cambridge City (6)	3–1	Hucknall Town (6)
21	Woking (5)	0–0	Newport County (6)
replay	Newport County (6)	3–1	Woking (5)
22	Folkestone Invicta (6)	1–1	Welling United (6)
replay	Welling United (6)	5–1	Folkestone Invicta (6)
23	Mangotsfield United (7)	0–0	Lewes (8)
replay	Lewes (8)	2–0	Mangotsfield United (7)
24	Stevenage Borough (5)	0–0	Kettering Town (6)
replay	Kettering Town (6)	2–1	Stevenage Borough (5)
25	Burton Albion (6)	0–2	Gravesend & Northfleet (6)
26	Fisher Athletic (7)	1–3	Forest Green Rovers (5)
27	Aldershot Town (6)	2–1	Hitchin Town (6)
28	Billericay Town (6)	1–2	Tiverton Town (6)
29	Basingstoke Town (6)	2–2	Dagenham & Redbridge (5)
replay	Dagenham & Redbridge (5)	3–0	Basingstoke Town (6)
30	Weymouth (6)	1–2	Hinckley United (6)
31	Tamworth (6)	2–1	Cirencester Town (7)
32	Canvey Island (6)	5–1	Stafford Rangers (6)

== 2001–02 FA Cup ==
See 2001–02 FA Cup for details of the rounds from the first round proper onwards.
