= 1998–99 FA Cup qualifying rounds =

Tournament details
- Country: England; Scotland; Wales

The 1998–99 FA Cup qualifying rounds opened the 118th season of competition in England for 'The Football Association Challenge Cup' (FA Cup), the world's oldest association football single knockout competition. A total of 558 clubs were accepted for the competition, down five from the previous season's 563.

The large number of clubs entering the tournament meant that the competition started with preliminary and four qualifying knockouts for these non-League teams. The 32 winning teams from fourth round qualifying progressed to the First round proper, where League teams tiered at Levels 3 and 4 entered the competition.

== Calendar ==
Round	Start date	Leagues entering at this round	New entries this round	Winners from previous round	Number of fixtures
Preliminary round	21 August 1998	Isthmian League; Northern Premier League; Southern League (except Premier divisions)	172	none	86
Preliminary round	21 August 1998	Combined Counties League; Eastern Counties League; Essex Senior League; Hellenic League; Kent League; Midland Alliance; North West Counties League; Northern Counties East League; Northern League; South Western Football League; Spartan South Midlands League; Sussex County League; United Counties League; Wessex League; West Midlands (Regional) League; Western League	172	none	86
First round qualifying	4 September 1998	none	206	86	146
Second round qualifying	18 September 1998	Isthmian League; Northern Premier League; Southern Football League (Premier divisions)	66	146	106
Third round qualifying	2 October 1998	Football Conference	22	106	64
Fourth round qualifying	16 October 1998	none	none	64	32

== Preliminary round ==
Matches were played on weekend of Saturday 21 August 1998. A total of 172 clubs took part in this stage of the competition, including 44 clubs from the four divisions at Level 7 of English football and 128 clubs from sixteen lower-level leagues, while other 44 clubs from the four divisions at Level 7 of English football and 162 clubs from lower-level leagues get a bye to the first round qualifying.

Tie	Home team (tier)	Score	Away team (tier)
1	Ashton United (7)	5–2	Willington (9)
2	Thackley (8)	2–1	Hebburn (8)
3	Atherton Collieries (8)	1–2	Armthorpe Welfare (8)
4	Stockton (8)	1–4	Liversedge (8)
5	Rossendale United (8)	0–3	Brigg Town (8)
6	Ashington (9)	2–1	Horden Colliery Welfare (9)
7	Sheffield (8)	2–4	Atherton Laburnum Rovers (8)
8	Trafford (7)	4–1	Peterlee Newtown (9)
9	Ramsbottom United (8)	0–0	Maine Road (8)
replay	Maine Road (8)	1–2	Ramsbottom United (8)
10	Harrogate Town (7)	1–2	Burscough (7)
11	Tadcaster Albion (9)	1–0	Ossett Town (8)
12	Guisborough Town (8)	1–3	Rossington Main (9)
13	Shotton Comrades (9)	1–2	Jarrow Roofing BCA (8)
14	Flixton (7)	3–0	Northallerton Town (9)
15	Marske United (8)	1–1	Billingham Synthonia (8)
replay	Billingham Synthonia (8)	3–0	Marske United (8)
16	Oldham Town (9)	0–2	Warrington Town (9)
17	Bacup Borough (9)	w/o	Blackpool Rovers (10)
Walkover for Bacup Borough – Blackpool Rovers removed
18	Bradford Park Avenue (7)	4–1	Easington Colliery (8)
19	Yorkshire Amateur (9)	1–3	Witton Albion (7)
20	Durham City (9)	2–0	Dunston Federation Brewery (8)
21	Sandwell Borough (8)	0–3	Blakenall (7)
22	Boston Town (8)	2–0	Blackstones (8)
23	Shepshed Dynamo (7)	1–1	Barwell (8)
replay	Barwell (8)	3–3 (6–7 p)	Shepshed Dynamo (7)
24	Sutton Coldfield Town (7)	1–0	VS Rugby (7)
25	Hinckley United (7)	2–0	Rushall Olympic (8)
26	Lye Town (9)	0–1	Racing Club Warwick (7)
27	Oldbury United (8)	2–0	Shifnal Town (8)
28	Stafford Rangers (7)	3–0	Boldmere St Michaels (8)
29	Matlock Town (7)	4–1	Redditch United (7)
30	Halesowen Harriers (8)	2–1	Stourport Swifts (8)
31	Bridgnorth Town (8)	3–3	Borrowash Victoria (9)
replay	Borrowash Victoria (9)	0–2	Bridgnorth Town (8)
32	Corby Town (7)	0–4	Leek CSOB (8)
33	Chelmsford City (7)	6–0	Fakenham Town (8)
34	Canvey Island (7)	6–1	Stansted (10)
35	Eynesbury Rovers (8)	3–3	Southall (9)
replay	Southall (9)	6–0	Eynesbury Rovers (8)
36	Tring Town (9)	0–2	Waltham Abbey (10)
3-0 win awarded to Tring Town due to a rule break by the opposition
37	Bowers United (10)	5–3	Wootton Blue Cross (8)
38	Felixstowe Port & Town (8)	1–2	Ford Sports Daventry (8)
39	Leyton Pennant (7)	2–1	Wembley (7)
40	Stotfold (8)	2–2	Sudbury Town (8)
replay	Sudbury Town (8)	2–1	Stotfold (8)
41	Harpenden Town	3–2	Burnham
42	Potton United	0–3	Baldock Town (7)
43	Hornchurch	1–1	London Colney
replay	London Colney	1–0	Hornchurch
44	Marlow	2–1	Hemel Hempstead

Tie	Home team (tier)	Score	Away team (tier)
45	Bury Town	1–1	Tilbury
replay	Tilbury	3–2	Bury Town
46	Kingsbury Town	4–4	Grays Athletic (7)
replay	Grays Athletic (7)	7–0	Kingsbury Town
47	Stowmarket Town	5–1	Gorleston
48	Potters Bar Town	2–2	Wealdstone (7)
replay	Wealdstone (7)	5–3	Potters Bar Town
49	Witney Town (7)	3–0	Northwood
50	Arlesey Town	0–2	Barking
51	Welwyn Garden City	6–1	East Thurrock United
52	Ford United	2–0	Wellingborough Town
53	Burnham Ramblers	2–1	Soham Town Rangers
54	Halstead Town	3–0	Flackwell Heath
55	Wisbech Town (7)	2–3	Bedford Town
56	Desborough Town	1–0	Cheshunt
57	Farnham Town	1–1	Hailsham Town
replay	Hailsham Town	3–2	Farnham Town
58	Molesey (7)	1–4	Oxford City (7)
59	Deal Town	4–1	Hillingdon Borough
60	Egham Town	2–2	Fisher Athletic (7)
replay	Fisher Athletic (7)	6–0	Egham Town
61	St Leonards (7)	2–1	Wick
62	Cowes Sports	1–2	Dorking
63	Godalming & Guildford	1–2	Banstead Athletic
64	Dartford (7)	0–0	Reading Town
replay	Reading Town	0–3	Dartford (7)
65	Folkestone Invicta (7)	2–3	Tonbridge Angels (7)
66	Ashford Town (Kent) (7)	1–1	Margate (7)
replay	Margate (7)	1–2	Ashford Town (Kent) (7)
67	Littlehampton Town	1–4	Fleet Town (7)
68	Fareham Town	0–2	Croydon (7)
69	Portfield	1–1	Eastleigh
replay	Eastleigh	0–3	Portfield
70	Abingdon Town	0–3	Maidenhead United (7)
71	Ashford Town (Middx)	1–3	Erith & Belvedere (7)
72	Bashley (7)	4–2	Ramsgate
73	Chatham Town	1–1	Horsham
replay	Horsham	3–1	Chatham Town
74	Eastbourne Town	1–0	Herne Bay
75	Wokingham Town	0–2	Camberley Town
76	Burgess Hill Town	1–0	Thame United
77	Torrington	0–1	Melksham Town
78	Cirencester Town (7)	3–2	Chippenham Town
79	Falmouth Town	1–0	Devizes Town
80	Newport (7)	0–0	Weston-super-Mare (7)
replay	Weston-super-Mare (7)	1–0	Newport (7)
81	Elmore	1–0	Yate Town (7)
82	Paulton Rovers	2–1	Bemerton Heath Harlequins
83	Minehead Town	4–0	Frome Town
84	Backwell United	2–1	Calne Town
85	Bideford	1–2	Barnstaple Town
86	Bridgwater Town	5–0	Welton Rovers

== First round qualifying ==
Matches were played on weekend of 4 September 1998. A total of 292 clubs took part in this stage of the competition, including the 86 winners from the preliminary round and 206 clubs, who get a bye to this round, including 44 clubs from the four divisions at Level 7 of English football.

Tie	Home team (tier)	Score	Away team (tier)
1	Billingham Town	7–3	Denaby United
2	Ashington	0–2	Louth United
3	Atherton Laburnum Rovers	0–4	Chester-le-Street Town
4	Prescot Cables	5–2	Liversedge
5	Crook Town	1–4	Farsley Celtic (7)
6	Eccleshill United	2–2	Penrith
replay	Penrith	6–0	Eccleshill United
7	Brigg Town	1–0	Garforth Town
8	Tadcaster Albion	1–1	Armthorpe Welfare
replay	Armthorpe Welfare	0–0 (3–4 p)	Tadcaster Albion
9	Seaham Red Star	2–2	Netherfield Kendal (7)
replay	Netherfield Kendal (7)	8–1	Seaham Red Star
10	Warrington Town	0–4	North Ferriby United
11	Bootle	2–3	Bradford Park Avenue (7)
12	Glasshoughton Welfare	3–1	Salford City
Glasshoughton Welfare expelled for playing ineligible player - Salford City awarded a 0-3 win
13	Consett	1–2	Newcastle Blue Star
14	West Auckland Town	5–0	Rossington Main
15	Chadderton	1–1	Ryhope Community Association
replay	Ryhope Community Association	2–1	Chadderton
16	St Helens Town	3–1	Brandon United
17	Radcliffe Borough (7)	2–1	Clitheroe
18	Evenwood Town	4–1	Durham City
19	Droylsden (7)	2–2	Maltby Main
replay	Maltby Main	0–2	Droylsden (7)
20	Flixton (7)	3–0	Brodsworth Miners Welfare
21	Ossett Albion	1–1	Workington
replay	Workington	2–2 (2–4 p)	Ossett Albion
22	Ashton United (7)	2–1	Tow Law Town
23	Great Harwood Town (7)	3–3	Whitley Bay (7)
replay	Whitley Bay (7)	1–2	Great Harwood Town (7)
24	South Shields	0–2	Witton Albion (7)
25	Morpeth Town	2–0	Skelmersdale United
26	Parkgate	4–2	Cheadle Town
27	Ramsbottom United	3–0	Shildon
28	Trafford (7)	1–2	Mossley
29	Bedlington Terriers	11–1	Pickering Town
30	Billingham Synthonia	7–0	Darwen
31	Gretna (7)	0–0	Harrogate Railway Athletic
replay	Harrogate Railway Athletic	2–1	Gretna (7)
32	Whickham	0–2	Stocksbridge Park Steels (7)
33	Thackley	2–0	Bacup Borough
34	Selby Town	6–0	Curzon Ashton
35	Burscough (7)	2–0	Jarrow Roofing BCA
36	Staveley Miners Welfare	1–3	Leek CSOB
37	Racing Club Warwick (7)	1–0	Willenhall Town
38	Boston Town	0–5	Eastwood Town (7)
39	Stapenhill	1–0	Spalding United
40	Belper Town (7)	3–0	Alfreton Town (7)
41	Rocester	3–0	Holbeach United
42	Shepshed Dynamo (7)	4–1	Bloxwich Town (7)
43	Glapwell	1–2	Matlock Town (7)
44	Lincoln United (7)	3–0	Wednesfield
45	Halesowen Harriers	1–2	Nantwich Town
46	West Midlands Police	1–0	Stratford Town
47	Blakenall (7)	1–0	Hinckley United (7)
48	Congleton Town (7)	5–3	Bilston Town (7)
49	Moor Green (7)	6–1	Pelsall Villa
50	Bourne Town	1–2	Glossop North End
51	Sutton Coldfield Town (7)	2–1	Kidsgrove Athletic
52	Arnold Town	3–1	Knypersley Victoria
53	Stamford (7)	2–3	Buxton
54	Newcastle Town	1–3	Chasetown
55	Paget Rangers (7)	1–1	Solihull Borough (7)
replay	Solihull Borough (7)	4–2	Paget Rangers (7)
56	Oldbury United	1–6	Stourbridge (7)
57	Bridgnorth Town	0–4	Hucknall Town (7)
58	Stafford Rangers (7)	1–1	Bedworth United (7)
replay	Bedworth United (7)	1–2	Stafford Rangers (7)
59	Wroxham	3–0	Stewart & Lloyds Corby
60	Chalfont St Peter	3–3	St Neots Town
replay	St Neots Town	0–3	Chalfont St Peter
61	Beaconsfield SYCOB	2–1	Concord Rangers
62	London Colney	1–3	Braintree Town (7)
63	Banbury United	3–1	Harpenden Town
64	Hertford Town	0–0	Barkingside
replay	Barkingside	3–2	Hertford Town
65	Leighton Town	1–2	Ford Sports Daventry
66	Canvey Island (7)	5–3	Histon
67	Edgware Town	2–3	Grays Athletic (7)
68	Northampton Spencer	1–4	Chelmsford City (7)
69	Bowers United	1–3	Halstead Town
70	Burnham Ramblers	2–2	Basildon United
replay	Basildon United	2–0	Burnham Ramblers
71	Marlow	1–2	Tiptree United
72	Woodbridge Town	4–2	Southall
73	Buckingham Town	0–1	Wealdstone (7)

Tie	Home team (tier)	Score	Away team (tier)
74	Bedford United	0–3	Royston Town
75	Ford United	1–1	Barton Rovers (7)
replay	Barton Rovers (7)	0–1	Ford United
76	Yaxley	2–5	Berkhamsted Town (7)
77	Clapton	2–0	Tilbury
78	Harlow Town	5–0	Diss Town
79	Sudbury Town	4–0	Ruislip Manor
80	Barking	3–2	Warboys Town
81	Newmarket Town	0–0	Great Yarmouth Town
replay	Great Yarmouth Town	2–2 (2–4 p)	Newmarket Town
82	Ware	3–2	Leyton Pennant (7)
83	Ely City	0–4	Harwich & Parkeston
84	Brook House	1–3	Aveley
85	Yeading (7)	1–2	Welwyn Garden City
86	Staines Town (7)	1–1	Lowestoft Town
replay	Lowestoft Town	2–2 (3–1 p)	Staines Town (7)
87	Stowmarket Town	0–1	Romford (7)
88	Desborough Town	1–2	Raunds Town (7)
89	Tring Town	0–1	Wingate & Finchley
90	Clacton Town	1–1	Bedford Town
replay	Bedford Town	2–0	Clacton Town
91	Long Buckby	1–2	Witney Town (7)
92	Sudbury Wanderers	0–0	Uxbridge (7)
replay	Uxbridge (7)	3–2	Sudbury Wanderers
93	Witham Town	1–0	Hitchin Town (7)
94	Brackley Town (7)	0–2	Wivenhoe Town
95	Baldock Town (7)	1–3	Great Wakering Rovers
96	Sheppey United	0–0	Lymington & New Milton
replay	Lymington & New Milton	1–2	Sheppey United
97	East Preston	6–0	Peacehaven & Telscombe
98	Thatcham Town	3–4	Ashford Town (Kent) (7)
99	Oxford City (7)	3–2	Chertsey Town (7)
100	Bedfont	5–2	Whitstable Town
101	Fisher Athletic (7)	4–0	BAT Sports
102	Corinthian-Casuals	1–2	Worthing (7)
103	Havant & Waterlooville (7)	1–0	Hassocks
104	Thamesmead Town	3–0	Horsham YMCA
105	Burgess Hill Town	1–3	Saltdean United
106	Arundel	0–7	Camberley Town
107	Horsham	2–2	Bracknell Town
replay	Bracknell Town	3–4	Horsham
108	Gosport Borough	0–2	Croydon (7)
109	Slade Green	2–4	Hungerford Town
110	Fleet Town (7)	3–2	Dartford (7)
111	Chipstead	2–0	Redhill
112	Langney Sports	3–1	Hailsham Town
113	AFC Newbury	1–2	Tooting & Mitcham United
114	Eastbourne Town	2–2	Tunbridge Wells
replay	Tunbridge Wells	2–4	Eastbourne Town
115	Metropolitan Police	2–2	Canterbury City
replay	Canterbury City	1–1 (4–3 p)	Metropolitan Police
116	Leatherhead (7)	5–0	Whitehawk
117	Viking Sports	1–5	Bashley (7)
118	Sandhurst Town	0–1	Tonbridge Angels (7)
119	Bognor Regis Town (7)	2–4	Newport (Isle of Wight) (7)
120	Andover (7)	2–5	Deal Town
121	Epsom & Ewell	2–1	Shoreham
122	Windsor & Eton	1–1	Chichester City
replay	Chichester City	0–4	Windsor & Eton
123	Portsmouth Royal Navy	4–2	Raynes Park Vale
124	Whyteleafe (7)	2–2	Banstead Athletic
replay	Banstead Athletic	1–2	Whyteleafe (7)
125	Maidenhead United (7)	2–1	Selsey
126	Brockenhurst	1–7	Dorking
127	Ash United	7–1	Pagham
128	Hythe United	2–1	Croydon Athletic
129	Portfield	1–2	Sittingbourne (7)
130	Lewes	1–2	Erith & Belvedere (7)
131	St Leonards (7)	2–0	Erith Town
132	Ringmer	1–0	Didcot Town
133	Falmouth Town	3–1	Wimborne Town
134	Tuffley Rovers	0–3	Minehead Town
135	Mangotsfield United	2–1	Melksham Town
136	Tiverton Town	2–0	Weston-super-Mare (7)
137	Paulton Rovers	8–1	Glastonbury
138	Taunton Town	4–0	Bournemouth
139	Barnstaple Town	1–0	Evesham United (7)
140	Bridgwater Town	1–0	Bridport
141	Cirencester Town (7)	2–2	Odd Down
replay	Odd Down	0–2	Cirencester Town (7)
142	St Blazey	3–2	EFC Cheltenham
143	Brislington	3–3	Pershore Town
replay	Pershore Town	4–2	Brislington
144	Westbury United	3–3	Elmore
replay	Elmore	4–0	Westbury United
145	Backwell United	10–1	Downton
146	Clevedon Town (7)	1–1	Cinderford Town (7)
replay	Cinderford Town (7)	0–0 (5–4 p)	Clevedon Town (7)

== Second round qualifying ==
Matches were played on weekend of 18 September 1998. A total of 212 clubs took part in this stage of the competition, including the 146 winners from the first round qualifying and 66 Level 6 clubs, from Premier divisions of the Isthmian League, Northern Premier League and Southern Football League, entering at this stage.

Tie	Home team (tier)	Score	Away team (tier)
1	Selby Town	1–2	Frickley Athletic (6)
2	Colwyn Bay (6)	0–1	Emley (6)
3	Whitby Town (6)	4–2	Accrington Stanley (6)
4	Radcliffe Borough (7)	2–0	Ryhope Community Association
5	Billingham Synthonia	0–0	Mossley
replay	Mossley	1–0	Billingham Synthonia
6	Louth United	0–2	Brigg Town
7	Ashton United (7)	1–0	Altrincham (6)
8	Flixton (7)	4–0	Spennymoor United (6)
9	Thackley	1–1	Guiseley (6)
replay	Guiseley (6)	2–1	Thackley
10	Netherfield Kendal (7)	1–3	Lancaster City (6)
11	Bradford Park Avenue (7)	1–0	Stocksbridge Park Steels (7)
12	Runcorn (6)	0–0	Blyth Spartans (6)
replay	Blyth Spartans (6)	2–4	Runcorn (6)
13	Hyde United (6)	4–0	Gainsborough Trinity (6)
14	Morpeth Town	0–0	Ossett Albion
replay	Ossett Albion	2–2 (2–4 p)	Morpeth Town
15	Gateshead (6)	3–0	Bishop Auckland (6)
16	Droylsden (7)	6–0	St Helens Town
17	Bedlington Terriers	1–1	Bamber Bridge (6)
replay	Bamber Bridge (6)	4–4 (3–4 p)	Bedlington Terriers
18	Penrith	1–1	Chorley (6)
replay	Chorley (6)	1–0	Penrith
19	Stalybridge Celtic (6)	1–2	Worksop Town (6)
20	Great Harwood Town (7)	1–3	Marine (6)
21	Witton Albion (7)	7–2	Salford City
22	Ramsbottom United	3–0	Billingham Town
23	North Ferriby United	5–3	Newcastle Blue Star
24	Burscough (7)	2–2	Evenwood Town
replay	Evenwood Town	0–6	Burscough (7)
25	Leigh RMI (6)	1–0	Winsford United (6)
26	Tadcaster Albion	1–2	Farsley Celtic (7)
27	Harrogate Railway Athletic	1–1	Prescot Cables
replay	Prescot Cables	2–0	Harrogate Railway Athletic
28	Chester-le-Street Town	1–1	West Auckland Town
replay	West Auckland Town	2–0	Chester-le-Street Town
29	Grantham Town (6)	4–0	West Midlands Police
30	Cambridge City (6)	1–1	Glossop North End
replay	Glossop North End	1–1 (5–4 p)	Cambridge City (6)
31	Congleton Town (7)	1–0	Boston United (6)
32	Parkgate	0–3	Sutton Coldfield Town (7)
33	Racing Club Warwick (7)	0–1	Stourbridge (7)
34	Arnold Town	1–1	Matlock Town (7)
replay	Matlock Town (7)	0–2	Arnold Town
35	Belper Town (7)	1–2	Stafford Rangers (7)
36	Blakenall (7)	1–0	Lincoln United (7)
37	Shepshed Dynamo (7)	1–2	Gresley Rovers (6)
38	Nantwich Town	1–1	Raunds Town (7)
replay	Raunds Town (7)	2–0	Nantwich Town
39	Stapenhill	0–4	Rothwell Town (6)
40	Ilkeston Town (6)	2–0	Moor Green (7)
41	Atherstone United (6)	0–0	Nuneaton Borough (6)
replay	Nuneaton Borough (6)	3–0	Atherstone United (6)
42	Solihull Borough (7)	0–1	Hucknall Town (7)
43	Halesowen Town (6)	2–2	Eastwood Town (7)
replay	Eastwood Town (7)	0–1	Halesowen Town (6)
44	Chasetown	0–1	Buxton
45	Leek CSOB	2–3	Tamworth (6)
46	Rocester	0–1	Burton Albion (6)
47	Bromsgrove Rovers (6)	1–1	King's Lynn (6)
replay	King's Lynn (6)	2–1	Bromsgrove Rovers (6)
48	Dorking	0–5	Carshalton Athletic (6)
49	Sheppey United	0–0	Leatherhead (7)
replay	Leatherhead (7)	3–1	Sheppey United
50	Witney Town (7)	1–1	Wroxham
replay	Wroxham	2–3	Witney Town (7)
51	Grays Athletic (7)	2–0	Ashford Town (Kent) (7)

Tie	Home team (tier)	Score	Away team (tier)
52	Sudbury Town	0–0	Sittingbourne (7)
replay	Sittingbourne (7)	1–2	Sudbury Town
53	Bedfont	0–2	Chipstead
54	Dagenham & Redbridge (6)	4–0	Eastbourne Town
55	Welwyn Garden City	2–2	Great Wakering Rovers
replay	Great Wakering Rovers	3–4	Welwyn Garden City
56	Ash United	1–5	Walton & Hersham (6)
57	Clapton	0–1	Purfleet (6)
58	Bishop's Stortford (6)	0–2	Aldershot Town (6)
59	Banbury United	2–2	Epsom & Ewell
replay	Epsom & Ewell	0–1	Banbury United
60	Tooting & Mitcham United	2–3	Lowestoft Town
61	Wivenhoe Town	1–3	Harlow Town
62	Fisher Athletic (7)	1–2	Halstead Town
63	Hendon (6)	1–1	Chelmsford City (7)
replay	Chelmsford City (7)	2–3	Hendon (6)
64	Slough Town (6)	1–1	Fleet Town (7)
replay	Fleet Town (7)	0–2	Slough Town (6)
65	Romford (7)	1–2	St Albans City (6)
66	Ware	1–1	Braintree Town (7)
replay	Braintree Town (7)	4–1	Ware
67	Boreham Wood (6)	4–0	Saltdean United
68	Berkhamsted Town (7)	1–1	Langney Sports
replay	Langney Sports	0–0 (4–3 p)	Berkhamsted Town (7)
69	Tiptree United	0–1	Royston Town
70	Barking	1–0	Beaconsfield SYCOB
71	Witham Town	5–2	Hythe United
72	Whyteleafe (7)	2–1	Bedford Town
73	Aylesbury United (6)	3–1	Horsham
74	St Leonards (7)	0–1	Sutton United (6)
75	East Preston	0–2	Worthing (7)
76	Croydon (7)	0–4	Enfield (6)
77	Billericay Town (6)	4–0	Tonbridge Angels (7)
78	Basildon United	2–2	Barkingside
replay	Barkingside	3–3 (2–4 p)	Basildon United
79	Ford Sports Daventry	2–1	Aveley
80	Crawley Town (6)	5–0	Canterbury City
81	Wingate & Finchley	0–5	Canvey Island (7)
82	Heybridge Swifts (6)	3–1	Bashley (7)
83	Uxbridge (7)	0–5	Maidenhead United (7)
84	Dulwich Hamlet (6)	1–0	Deal Town
85	Bromley (6)	2–1	Chesham United (6)
86	Wealdstone (7)	0–0	Newport (Isle of Wight) (7)
replay	Newport (Isle of Wight) (7)	3–2	Wealdstone (7)
87	Hungerford Town	6–0	Portsmouth Royal Navy
88	Havant & Waterlooville (7)	5–1	Hampton (6)
89	Harwich & Parkeston	0–2	Chalfont St Peter
90	Erith & Belvedere (7)	0–1	Windsor & Eton
91	Ford United	1–1	Woodbridge Town
replay	Woodbridge Town	1–2	Ford United
92	Harrow Borough (6)	3–0	Thamesmead Town
93	Gravesend & Northfleet (6)	3–1	Oxford City (7)
94	Newmarket Town	1–1	Hastings Town (6)
replay	Hastings Town (6)	2–1	Newmarket Town
95	Camberley Town	2–1	Ringmer
96	Bath City (6)	3–1	Cirencester Town (7)
97	Dorchester Town (6)	0–3	Salisbury City (6)
98	Mangotsfield United	0–1	Worcester City (6)
99	Taunton Town	3–1	Cinderford Town (7)
100	Pershore Town	1–3	St Blazey
101	Minehead Town	0–0	Bridgwater Town
replay	Bridgwater Town	0–1	Minehead Town
102	Elmore	0–1	Barnstaple Town
103	Backwell United	1–1	Basingstoke Town (6)
replay	Basingstoke Town (6)	1–0	Backwell United
104	Falmouth Town	1–0	Tiverton Town
105	Merthyr Tydfil (6)	0–2	Weymouth (6)
106	Gloucester City (6)	2–1	Paulton Rovers

== Third round qualifying ==
Matches were played on weekend of 2 October 1998. A total of 128 clubs took part, 106 having progressed from the second round qualifying and 22 clubs from Football Conference, forming Level 5 of English football, entering at this stage.

Tie	Home team (tier)	Score	Away team (tier)
1	West Auckland Town (8)	2–0	Hyde United (6)
2	Mossley (8)	0–1	Lancaster City (6)
3	Whitby Town (6)	1–1	Bedlington Terriers (8)
replay	Bedlington Terriers (8)	1–1 (4–3 p)	Whitby Town (6)
4	Doncaster Rovers (5)	2–0	Flixton (7)
5	Runcorn (6)	1–1	North Ferriby United (8)
replay	North Ferriby United (8)	2–1	Runcorn (6)
Tie awarded to Runcorn, who were given a 3-0 replay win due to an opposition rule break
6	Gateshead (6)	2–1	Barrow (5)
7	Bradford Park Avenue (7)	0–1	Ashton United (7)
8	Emley (6)	0–0	Marine (6)
replay	Marine (6)	1–4	Emley (6)
9	Morpeth Town (8)	1–0	Prescot Cables (8)
10	Morecambe (5)	4–2	Farsley Celtic (7)
11	Frickley Athletic (6)	1–0	Witton Albion (7)
12	Guiseley (6)	1–1	Chorley (6)
replay	Chorley (6)	1–2	Guiseley (6)
13	Droylsden (7)	2–0	Northwich Victoria (5)
14	Worksop Town (6)	1–2	Leigh RMI (6)
15	Radcliffe Borough (7)	0–1	Burscough (7)
16	Ramsbottom United (8)	0–5	Southport (5)
17	Kidderminster Harriers (5)	3–1	Blakenall (7)
18	Halesowen Town (6)	1–2	Gresley Rovers (6)
19	Sutton Coldfield Town (7)	1–1	Telford United (5)
replay	Telford United (5)	1–0	Sutton Coldfield Town (7)
20	Congleton Town (7)	1–1	Hednesford Town (5)
replay	Hednesford Town (5)	1–0	Congleton Town (7)
21	Buxton (8)	0–0	Leek Town (5)
replay	Leek Town (5)	3–0	Buxton (8)
22	Stafford Rangers (7)	5–1	Arnold Town (8)
23	Burton Albion (6)	2–1	Nuneaton Borough (6)
24	Glossop North End (8)	2–3	Grantham Town (6)
25	Brigg Town (8)	0–2	Tamworth (6)
26	Raunds Town (7)	2–2	Rothwell Town (6)
replay	Rothwell Town (6)	0–1	Raunds Town (7)
27	Ilkeston Town (6)	1–2	King's Lynn (6)
28	Hucknall Town (7)	0–0	Stourbridge (7)
replay	Stourbridge (7)	3–0	Hucknall Town (7)
29	Hastings Town (6)	0–3	Yeovil Town (5)
30	Hereford United (5)	2–3	Newport (Isle of Wight) (7)
31	Crawley Town (6)	1–0	Billericay Town (6)

Tie	Home team (tier)	Score	Away team (tier)
32	Worcester City (6)	3–1	Falmouth Town (10)
33	Gravesend & Northfleet (6)	0–0	Dover Athletic (5)
replay	Dover Athletic (5)	3–2	Gravesend & Northfleet (6)
34	Farnborough Town (5)	2–0	Heybridge Swifts (6)
35	Basingstoke Town (6)	2–0	Chalfont St Peter (8)
36	Taunton Town (8)	4–3	Kettering Town (5)
37	Dulwich Hamlet (6)	2–2	Purfleet (6)
replay	Purfleet (6)	1–3	Dulwich Hamlet (6)
38	Welling United (5)	3–2	Weymouth (6)
39	Barnstaple Town (8)	0–1	Cheltenham Town (5)
40	Dagenham & Redbridge (6)	2–0	Chipstead (10)
41	Rushden & Diamonds (5)	2–0	Forest Green Rovers (5)
42	Welwyn Garden City (10)	2–2	Ford United (8)
replay	Ford United (8)	4–2	Welwyn Garden City (10)
43	Hayes (5)	1–0	Bromley (6)
44	Maidenhead United (7)	2–4	Kingstonian (5)
45	Royston Town (10)	0–2	Boreham Wood (6)
46	Minehead Town (9)	1–5	Woking (5)
47	Witney Town (7)	1–2	Stevenage Borough (5)
48	Gloucester City (6)	10–0	Sudbury Town
49	Slough Town (6)	3–1	Halstead Town
50	Braintree Town (7)	1–3	Camberley Town
51	Langney Sports	4–1	Harrow Borough (6)
52	Worthing (7)	0–2	Whyteleafe (7)
53	Leatherhead (7)	2–0	Windsor & Eton
54	Grays Athletic (7)	0–1	Aldershot Town (6)
55	Walton & Hersham (6)	2–2	Bath City (6)
replay	Bath City (6)	3–0	Walton & Hersham (6)
56	Aylesbury United (6)	0–1	Carshalton Athletic (6)
57	St Albans City (6)	3–0	Basildon United
58	Lowestoft Town	4–2	Canvey Island (7)
59	Banbury United	0–4	Enfield (6)
60	Hungerford Town	1–1	Salisbury City (6)
replay	Salisbury City (6)	3–2	Hungerford Town
61	Ford Sports Daventry	2–2	Sutton United (6)
replay	Sutton United (6)	3–0	Ford Sports Daventry
62	Havant & Waterlooville (7)	0–0	Witham Town
replay	Witham Town	0–4	Havant & Waterlooville (7)
63	Harlow Town	2–4	Hendon (6)
64	St Blazey	1–0	Barking

== Fourth round qualifying ==
Matches were played on weekend of 16 October 1998. A total of 64 clubs took part, all having progressed from the third round qualifying.

Tie	Home team (tier)	Score	Away team (tier)
1	Runcorn (6)	5–3	Ashton United (7)
2	King's Lynn (6)	0–1	West Auckland Town (8)
3	Tamworth (6)	2–1	Grantham Town (6)
4	Droylsden (7)	1–2	Leigh RMI (6)
5	Southport (5)	4–0	Stourbridge (7)
6	Leek Town (5)	0–3	Lancaster City (6)
7	Telford United (5)	2–1	Burscough (7)
8	Doncaster Rovers (5)	3–1	Guiseley (6)
9	Morpeth Town (8)	0–1	Burton Albion (6)
10	Frickley Athletic (6)	0–0	Gresley Rovers (6)
replay	Gresley Rovers (6)	2–1	Frickley Athletic (6)
11	Morecambe (5)	1–2	Hednesford Town (5)
12	Emley (6)	1–1	Gateshead (6)
replay	Gateshead (6)	0–2	Emley (6)
13	Stafford Rangers (7)	1–2	Bedlington Terriers
14	Aldershot Town (6)	0–0	Woking (5)
replay	Woking (5)	2–1	Aldershot Town (6)
15	St Albans City (6)	1–1	Kingstonian (5)
replay	Kingstonian (5)	1–1 (5–4 p)	St Albans City (6)
16	Enfield (6)	2–0	Raunds Town (7)

Tie	Home team (tier)	Score	Away team (tier)
17	Havant & Waterlooville (7)	2–2	Hayes (5)
replay	Hayes (5)	1–1 (4–3 p)	Havant & Waterlooville (7)
18	Dagenham & Redbridge (6)	0–3	Stevenage Borough (5)
19	Lowestoft Town (8)	1–3	Ford United (8)
20	Hendon (6)	4–0	Bath City (6)
21	Basingstoke Town (6)	2–2	Dover Athletic (5)
replay	Dover Athletic (5)	1–2	Basingstoke Town (6)
22	Boreham Wood (6)	1–0	Sutton United (6)
23	Worcester City (6)	7–0	Langney Sports (8)
24	Welling United (5)	3–1	Whyteleafe (7)
25	Leatherhead (7)	1–1	Rushden & Diamonds (5)
replay	Rushden & Diamonds (5)	4–0	Leatherhead (7)
26	Kidderminster Harriers (5)	2–1	Gloucester City (6)
27	Farnborough Town (5)	1–3	Yeovil Town (5)
28	Carshalton Athletic (6)	0–6	Salisbury City (6)
29	Dulwich Hamlet (6)	3–2	Newport (Isle of Wight) (7)
30	Cheltenham Town (5)	3–2	Taunton Town (8)
31	St Blazey (10)	0–2	Camberley Town (9)
32	Crawley Town (6)	0–0	Slough Town (6)
replay	Slough Town (6)	3–2	Crawley Town (6)

== 1998–99 FA Cup ==
See 1998–99 FA Cup for details of the rounds from the first round proper onwards.
