= 1992–93 Northern Counties East Football League =

Northern Counties East Football League

The 1992–93 Northern Counties East Football League season was the 11th in the history of Northern Counties East Football League. The league consisted of 34 teams.

== Premier Division ==
Premier Division
- Champions: Spennymoor United
- Promoted: None
- Relegated: None

The division featured 20 teams, including the following new clubs:

- Pickering Town, promoted from NCEL Division One
- Stocksbridge Park Steels, promoted from NCEL Division One

In addition, Sutton Town changed their name to Ashfield United

=== Map ===
Location of the clubs in the 1992–93 NCEL Premier Division on a map of Yorkshire and the Humber
Location of the clubs in the 1992–93 NCEL Premier Division on a map of the East Midlands
Location of the clubs in the 1992–93 NCEL Premier Division on a map of North East England

=== League table ===
Pos	Team	Pld	W	D	L	GF	GA	GD	Pts	Promotion or relegation
1	Spennymoor United (C, P)	38	26	7	5	102	33	+69	85	Promotion to Northern Premier League Division One
2	Pickering Town	38	27	4	7	90	48	+42	85	
3	North Ferriby United	38	23	7	8	90	40	+50	76	
4	Maltby Miners Welfare	38	21	11	6	69	40	+29	74	
5	Thackley	38	20	7	11	62	39	+23	67	
6	Brigg Town	38	16	14	8	55	39	+16	62	
7	Denaby United	38	15	11	12	71	63	+8	56	
8	Ossett Albion	38	16	7	15	68	60	+8	55	
9	Eccleshill United	38	16	6	16	65	65	0	54	
10	Winterton Rangers	38	14	7	17	61	72	−11	49	
11	Ashfield United	38	12	11	15	69	88	−19	47	
12	Ossett Town	38	13	7	18	69	71	−2	46	
13	Belper Town	38	11	12	15	56	62	−6	45	
14	Liversedge	38	12	8	18	56	77	−21	44	
15	Sheffield	38	12	6	20	55	70	−15	42	
16	Stocksbridge Park Steels	38	10	11	17	54	70	−16	41	
17	Pontefract Collieries	38	11	8	19	62	88	−26	41	
18	Glasshoughton Welfare	38	9	9	20	46	77	−31	36	
19	Armthorpe Welfare	38	8	8	22	49	81	−32	32	
20	Harrogate Railway Athletic (R)	38	3	9	26	49	115	−66	18	Relegation to NCEL Division One

Updated to match(es) played on 1 June 1993. Source:
Rules for classification: 1) points; 2) goal difference; 3) number of goals scored.
(C) Champions; (P) Promoted; (R) Relegated

== Division One ==
Division One
- Champions: Lincoln United
- Promoted: Lincoln United; Hucknall Town
- Relegated: None

The division featured 14 teams, including the following new clubs:

- Hucknall Town
- Lincoln United

=== Map ===
Location of the clubs in the 1992–93 NCEL Division One on a map of Yorkshire and the Humber
Location of the clubs in the 1992–93 NCEL Division One on a map of the East Midlands

=== League table ===
Pos	Team	Pld	W	D	L	GF	GA	GD	Pts	Promotion
1	Lincoln United (C, P)	26	17	5	4	61	31	+30	56	Promotion to NCEL Premier Division
2	Hucknall Town (P)	26	15	6	5	54	32	+22	51	Promotion to NCEL Premier Division
3	Hallam	26	15	5	6	50	23	+27	50	
4	Yorkshire Amateur	26	14	3	9	42	29	+13	45	
5	RES Parkgate	26	12	9	5	39	38	+1	45	
6	Tadcaster Albion	26	12	5	9	52	43	+9	41	
7	Rossington Main	26	9	7	10	33	31	+2	34	
8	Hall Road Rangers	26	9	6	11	48	43	+5	33	
9	Garforth Town	26	8	8	10	34	38	−4	32	
10	Worsbrough Bridge Miners Welfare	26	7	8	11	33	48	−15	29	
11	Hatfield Main	26	6	6	14	40	63	−23	24	
12	Immingham Town	26	5	8	13	38	51	−13	23	
13	Brodsworth Miners Welfare	26	6	4	16	41	65	−24	22	
14	Selby Town	26	5	4	17	34	64	−30	19	
15	Bradley Rangers	0	0	0	0	0	0	0	0	Club folded, record expunged

Updated to match(es) played on 1 June 1993. Source:
Rules for classification: 1) points; 2) goal difference; 3) number of goals scored.
(C) Champions; (P) Promoted
