= 1995–96 Northern Counties East Football League =

The 1995–96 Northern Counties East Football League season was the 14th in the history of Northern Counties East Football League, a football competition in England.

== Premier Division ==
Northern Counties East Football League Premier Division
- Season: 1995–96
- Champions: Hatfield Main
- Promoted: Stocksbridge Park Steels
- Matches: 380
- Goals: 1,154 (3.04 per match)

The Premier Division featured 18 clubs which competed in the previous season, along with two new clubs:

- Hatfield Main, promoted from Division One
- Goole Town, relegated from the Northern Premier League

=== League table ===
Pos	Team	Pld	W	D	L	GF	GA	GD	Pts	Promotion or relegation
1	Hatfield Main	38	22	9	7	77	45	+32	75	
2	Stocksbridge Park Steels	38	21	10	7	59	36	+23	73	Promoted to the Northern Premier League Division One
3	North Ferriby United	38	21	9	8	78	33	+45	72	
4	Belper Town	38	20	10	8	66	39	+27	70	
5	Thackley	38	20	9	9	60	40	+20	69	
6	Denaby United	38	19	5	14	63	56	+7	62	
7	Brigg Town	38	17	8	13	65	50	+15	59	
8	Ashfield United	38	17	5	16	56	50	+6	56	
9	Liversedge	38	16	7	15	52	49	+3	55	
10	Ossett Albion	38	13	12	13	56	55	+1	51	
11	Armthorpe Welfare	38	13	11	14	53	47	+6	50	
12	Pickering Town	38	14	5	19	73	88	−15	47	
13	Arnold Town	38	13	7	18	51	57	−6	46	
14	Ossett Town	38	12	9	17	48	61	−13	45	
15	Goole Town	38	13	8	17	53	74	−21	43 (Note: Goole Town were deducted 4 points.)	Club folded
16	Hucknall Town	38	12	6	20	52	67	−15	42	
17	Hallam	38	11	7	20	41	68	−27	40	
18	Glasshoughton Welfare	38	10	9	19	47	62	−15	39	
19	Maltby Miners Welfare	38	11	5	22	58	83	−25	38	
20	Sheffield	38	6	7	25	46	94	−48	25	

Source: fchd
Rules for classification: 1) points; 2) goal difference; 3) number of goals scored.

== Division One ==
Northern Counties East Football League Division One
- Season: 1995–96
- Champions: Selby Town
- Promoted: Pontefract Collieries; Selby Town
- Matches: 240
- Goals: 835 (3.48 per match)

Division One featured 14 clubs which competed in the previous season, along with two new clubs:

- Borrowash Victoria, joined from the Central Midlands League
- Pontefract Collieries, relegated from the Premier Division

=== League table ===
Pos	Team	Pld	W	D	L	GF	GA	GD	Pts	Promotion or relegation
1	Selby Town	30	19	6	5	79	34	+45	63	Promoted to the Premier Division
2	Pontefract Collieries	30	19	6	5	76	33	+43	63	Promoted to the Premier Division
3	Garforth Town	30	18	7	5	63	27	+36	61	
4	Yorkshire Amateur	30	18	6	6	51	30	+21	60	
5	Hall Road Rangers	30	17	5	8	65	34	+31	56	
6	Eccleshill United	30	18	1	11	74	53	+21	55	
7	Borrowash Victoria	30	13	5	12	59	46	+13	44	
8	Harrogate Railway Athletic	30	12	5	13	48	52	−4	41	
9	Winterton Rangers	30	11	6	13	44	51	−7	39	
10	Rossington Main	30	10	7	13	43	55	−12	37	
11	Worsbrough Bridge Miners Welfare	30	9	5	16	48	60	−12	32	
12	Louth United	30	8	7	15	54	66	−12	31	
13	Blidworth Welfare	30	9	3	18	47	83	−36	30	
14	Tadcaster Albion	30	6	5	19	25	61	−36	23	
15	Parkgate	30	6	4	20	36	81	−45	22	
16	Brodsworth Miners Welfare	30	2	12	16	23	69	−46	18	

Source: fchd
Rules for classification: 1) points; 2) goal difference; 3) number of goals scored.
