= 1994–95 Northern Counties East Football League =

The 1994–95 Northern Counties East Football League season was the 13th in the history of Northern Counties East Football League, a football competition in England.

== Premier Division ==
Northern Counties East Football League Premier Division
- Season: 1994–95
- Champions: Lincoln United
- Promoted: Lincoln United
- Relegated: Pontefract Collieries
- Matches: 380
- Goals: 1,154 (3.04 per match)

The Premier Division featured 18 clubs which competed in the previous season, along with two new clubs, promoted from Division One:

- Arnold Town
- Hallam

=== League table ===
Pos	Team	Pld	W	D	L	GF	GA	GD	Pts	Promotion or relegation
1	Lincoln United	38	29	5	4	116	49	+67	92	Promoted to the Northern Premier League Division One
2	Arnold Town	38	25	7	6	98	46	+52	82	
3	Stocksbridge Park Steels	38	21	6	11	74	46	+28	69	
4	Belper Town	38	19	8	11	78	44	+34	65	
5	Ashfield United	38	18	11	9	65	48	+17	65	
6	North Ferriby United	38	19	7	12	89	63	+26	64	
7	Pickering Town	38	18	8	12	68	60	+8	62	
8	Armthorpe Welfare	38	13	18	7	56	41	+15	57	
9	Thackley	38	15	11	12	76	56	+20	56	
10	Ossett Albion	38	15	9	14	48	57	−9	54	
11	Brigg Town	38	14	10	14	49	57	−8	52	
12	Ossett Town	38	12	10	16	50	56	−6	46	
13	Maltby Miners Welfare	38	13	7	18	59	71	−12	46	
14	Denaby United	38	12	9	17	48	77	−29	45	
15	Hucknall Town	38	9	13	16	47	60	−13	40	
16	Glasshoughton Welfare	38	10	9	19	60	68	−8	39	
17	Hallam	38	9	8	21	46	76	−30	35	
18	Sheffield	38	6	12	20	45	87	−42	30	
19	Liversedge	38	7	8	23	48	81	−33	29	
20	Pontefract Collieries	38	3	10	25	30	107	−77	19	Relegated to Division One

Source: fchd
Rules for classification: 1) points; 2) goal difference; 3) number of goals scored.

== Division One ==
Northern Counties East Football League Division One
- Season: 1994–95
- Champions: Hatfield Main
- Promoted: Hatfield Main
- Matches: 240
- Goals: 835 (3.48 per match)

Division One featured 13 clubs which competed in the previous season, along with three new clubs.

- Clubs relegated from the Premier Division:
  - Eccleshill United
  - Winterton Rangers
- Plus:
  - Blidworth Welfare, joined from the Central Midlands League

Also, RES Parkgate changed name to Parkgate.

=== League table ===
Pos	Team	Pld	W	D	L	GF	GA	GD	Pts	Promotion or relegation
1	Hatfield Main	30	25	2	3	88	32	+56	77	Promoted to the Premier Division
2	Worsbrough Bridge Miners Welfare	30	19	4	7	66	40	+26	61	
3	Immingham Town	30	18	4	8	66	43	+23	58	Club folded
4	Selby Town	30	16	9	5	62	38	+24	57	
5	Yorkshire Amateur	30	15	8	7	53	29	+24	53	
6	Hall Road Rangers	30	15	7	8	57	44	+13	52	
7	Harrogate Railway Athletic	30	16	4	10	64	52	+12	52	
8	Eccleshill United	30	13	5	12	62	47	+15	44	
9	Garforth Town	30	11	8	11	58	49	+9	41	
10	Louth United	30	9	8	13	39	50	−11	35	
11	Rossington Main	30	9	7	14	48	63	−15	34	
12	Tadcaster Albion	30	6	8	16	36	59	−23	26	
13	Blidworth Welfare	30	7	5	18	39	63	−24	26	
14	Winterton Rangers	30	7	3	20	44	72	−28	24	
15	Parkgate	30	5	5	20	47	84	−37	18 (Note: Parkgate were deducted 2 points.)	
16	Brodsworth Miners Welfare	30	2	7	21	15	79	−64	13	

Source: fchd
Rules for classification: 1) points; 2) goal difference; 3) number of goals scored.
