= 1993–94 Northern Counties East Football League =

The 1993–94 Northern Counties East Football League season was the 12th in the history of Northern Counties East Football League, a football competition in England.

== Premier Division ==
Northern Counties East Football League Premier Division
- Season: 1993–94
- Champions: Stocksbridge Park Steels
- Relegated: Eccleshill United; Winterton Rangers
- Matches: 380
- Goals: 1,219 (3.21 per match)

The Premier Division featured 18 clubs which competed in the previous season, along with two new clubs, promoted from Division One:

- Hucknall Town
- Lincoln United

=== League table ===
Pos	Team	Pld	W	D	L	GF	GA	GD	Pts	Relegation
1	Stocksbridge Park Steels	38	23	5	10	82	39	+43	74	
2	Thackley	38	21	11	6	57	32	+25	74	
3	Lincoln United	38	21	9	8	82	44	+38	72	
4	Sheffield	38	22	5	11	69	49	+20	71	
5	Brigg Town	38	18	8	12	77	54	+23	62	
6	Pickering Town	38	17	10	11	76	61	+15	61	
7	Maltby Miners Welfare	38	18	6	14	77	62	+15	60	
8	Ossett Albion	38	16	12	10	73	59	+14	60	
9	North Ferriby United	38	18	5	15	57	43	+14	59	
10	Armthorpe Welfare	38	14	15	9	55	42	+13	57	
11	Liversedge	38	17	4	17	63	65	−2	55	
12	Glasshoughton Welfare	38	13	11	14	51	58	−7	50	
13	Denaby United	38	13	7	18	66	66	0	46	
14	Hucknall Town	38	13	5	20	48	65	−17	44	
15	Belper Town	38	12	7	19	57	75	−18	43	
16	Ossett Town	38	10	11	17	43	71	−28	41	
17	Pontefract Collieries	38	10	10	18	52	71	−19	40	
18	Ashfield United	38	9	8	21	50	85	−35	35	
19	Eccleshill United	38	8	9	21	44	75	−31	33	Relegated to Division One
20	Winterton Rangers	38	6	4	28	40	103	−63	22	Relegated to Division One

Source: fchd
Rules for classification: 1) points; 2) goal difference; 3) number of goals scored.

=== Map ===
Location of the clubs in the 1993–94 NCEL Premier Division on a map of Yorkshire and the Humber
Location of the clubs in the 1993–94 NCEL Premier Division on a map of the East Midlands

== Division One ==
Northern Counties East Football League Division One
- Season: 1993–94
- Champions: Arnold Town
- Promoted: Arnold Town; Hallam
- Matches: 210
- Goals: 755 (3.6 per match)

Division One featured 12 clubs which competed in the previous season, along with three new clubs.

- Clubs joined from the Central Midlands League:
  - Arnold Town
  - Louth United
- Plus:
  - Harrogate Railway Athletic, relegated from the Premier Division

=== League table ===
Pos	Team	Pld	W	D	L	GF	GA	GD	Pts	Promotion or relegation
1	Arnold Town	28	20	1	7	88	34	+54	61	Promoted to the Premier Division
2	Hallam	28	18	5	5	64	26	+38	59	Promoted to the Premier Division
3	Louth United	28	17	4	7	72	38	+34	55	
4	Hatfield Main	28	17	4	7	61	33	+28	55	
5	Yorkshire Amateur	28	16	4	8	51	25	+26	52	
6	Garforth Town	28	15	6	7	39	28	+11	51	
7	Rossington Main	28	12	4	12	43	47	−4	40	
8	Worsbrough Bridge Miners Welfare	28	11	3	14	49	47	+2	36	
9	Harrogate Railway Athletic	28	10	5	13	47	56	−9	35	
10	Hall Road Rangers	28	9	6	13	57	63	−6	33	
11	Selby Town	28	10	5	13	44	66	−22	29 (Note: Selby Town were deducted 6 points.)	
12	Tadcaster Albion	28	8	2	18	38	73	−35	26	
13	RES Parkgate	28	6	5	17	43	69	−26	23	
14	Immingham Town	28	6	5	17	33	76	−43	23	
15	Brodsworth Miners Welfare	28	3	5	20	26	74	−48	14	

Source: fchd
Rules for classification: 1) points; 2) goal difference; 3) number of goals scored.

=== Map ===
Location of the clubs in the 1993–94 NCEL Division One on a map of Yorkshire and the Humber
Location of the clubs in the 1993–94 NCEL Premier Division on a map of the East Midlands
