= 1991–92 Northern Counties East Football League =

Football league season

The 1991–92 Northern Counties East Football League season was the 10th in the history of Northern Counties East Football League, a football competition in England. The league consisted of only two divisions after Division Two was disbanded at the end of the previous season. Most of Division Two clubs were promoted to Division One.

== Premier Division ==
Northern Counties East Football League Premier Division
- Season: 1991–92
- Champions: North Shields
- Matches: 342
- Goals: 1,051 (3.07 per match)

The Premier Division featured 15 clubs which competed in the previous season, along with four new clubs, promoted from Division One:

- Eccleshill United
- Glasshoughton Welfare
- Liversedge
- Sheffield

=== Map ===
Location of the clubs in the 1991–92 NCEL Premier Division on a map of Yorkshire and the Humber
Location of the clubs in the 1991–92 NCEL Premier Division on a map of the East Midlands
Location of the clubs in the 1991–92 NCEL Premier Division on a map of North East England

=== League table ===
Pos	Team	Pld	W	D	L	GF	GA	GD	Pts	Promotion or relegation
1	North Shields	36	31	3	2	109	14	+95	96	Resigned from the league
2	Sutton Town	36	21	9	6	79	41	+38	72	
3	Denaby United	36	22	3	11	78	47	+31	68 (Note: Denaby United were deducted 1 point.)	
4	North Ferriby United	36	19	8	9	63	45	+18	65	
5	Spennymoor United	36	17	8	11	61	45	+16	59	
6	Sheffield	36	16	9	11	71	48	+23	57	
7	Maltby Miners Welfare	36	16	8	12	61	61	0	56	
8	Brigg Town	36	15	7	14	44	42	+2	52	
9	Thackley	36	14	9	13	45	45	0	51	
10	Ossett Albion	36	14	8	14	40	51	−11	50	
11	Belper Town	36	12	11	13	48	50	−2	47	
12	Ossett Town	36	11	12	13	48	57	−9	45	
13	Armthorpe Welfare	36	12	9	15	57	67	−10	45	
14	Liversedge	36	11	8	17	54	72	−18	41	
15	Winterton Rangers	36	10	5	21	53	78	−25	35	
16	Pontefract Collieries	36	9	7	20	36	71	−35	34	
17	Eccleshill United	36	7	10	19	38	83	−45	31	
18	Harrogate Railway Athletic	36	5	8	23	31	60	−29	23	
19	Glasshoughton Welfare	36	5	8	23	35	74	−39	23	

Source: fchd
Rules for classification: 1) points; 2) goal difference; 3) number of goals scored.

== Division One ==
Northern Counties East Football League Division One
- Season: 1991–92
- Champions: Stocksbridge Park Steels
- Promoted: Pickering Town; Stocksbridge Park Steels
- Matches: 240
- Goals: 802 (3.34 per match)

Division One featured seven clubs which competed in the previous season, along with nine new clubs.

- Clubs promoted from Division Two:
  - Bradley Rangers
  - Brodsworth Welfare
  - Hall Road Rangers
  - Immingham Town
  - Stocksbridge Park Steels
  - Tadcaster Albion
  - Worsbrough Bridge Miners Welfare
  - Yorkshire Amateur
- Plus:
  - Rossington Main, joined from the Central Midlands League

=== Map ===
Location of the clubs in the 1991–92 NCEL Division One on a map of Yorkshire and the Humber

=== League table ===
Pos	Team	Pld	W	D	L	GF	GA	GD	Pts	Promotion or relegation
1	Stocksbridge Park Steels	30	19	5	6	71	34	+37	62	Promoted to the Premier Division
2	Pickering Town	30	19	4	7	84	46	+38	61	Promoted to the Premier Division
3	Bradley Rangers	30	18	7	5	59	26	+33	61	
4	Yorkshire Amateur	30	18	3	9	56	27	+29	57	
5	Hallam	30	17	6	7	57	36	+21	57	
6	Hall Road Rangers	30	17	5	8	68	36	+32	56	
7	Rossington Main	30	13	5	12	44	38	+6	44	
8	RES Parkgate	30	12	5	13	41	59	−18	41	
9	Immingham Town	30	12	4	14	48	64	−16	40	
10	Worsbrough Bridge Miners Welfare	30	11	6	13	44	43	+1	39	
11	Garforth Town	30	10	5	15	48	44	+4	35	
12	Tadcaster Albion	30	8	4	18	37	62	−25	28	
13	Selby Town	30	8	4	18	32	67	−35	28	
14	York Railway Institute	30	6	7	17	32	77	−45	25	Resigned from the league
15	Brodsworth Miners Welfare	30	6	6	18	45	72	−27	24	
16	Hatfield Main	30	7	2	21	36	71	−35	22 (Note: Hatfield Main were deducted 1 point.)	

Source: fchd
Rules for classification: 1) points; 2) goal difference; 3) number of goals scored.
