= Len Weatherrall =

English footballer

Len Weatherall
Personal information
- Full name: Leonard Weatherall
- Date of birth: 21 May 1936
- Place of birth: Middlesbrough, England
- Position: Inside forward

Senior career*
Years	Team	Apps	(Gls)
1953–1955	Redcar Boys Club		
1955–1956	Grimsby Town	10	(1)
1956–1957	Weymouth		
1957–1958	Louth United		
1958–1959	Goole Town		
1959–19??	Ross Group		
- * Club domestic league appearances and goals

Leonard "Len" Weatherall (born 21 May 1936) was an English professional footballer who played as an inside forward.
