= 1996–97 Northern Counties East Football League =

The 1996–97 Northern Counties East Football League season was the 15th in the history of Northern Counties East Football League, a football competition in England.

== Premier Division ==
Northern Counties East Football League Premier Division
- Season: 1996–97
- Champions: Denaby United
- Promoted: Belper Town
- Matches: 380
- Goals: 1,183 (3.11 per match)

The Premier Division featured 18 clubs which competed in the previous season, along with two new clubs, promoted from Division One:

- Pontefract Collieries
- Selby Town

Also, Maltby Miners Welfare changed name to Maltby Main.

=== League table ===
Pos	Team	Pld	W	D	L	GF	GA	GD	Pts	Promotion or relegation
1	Denaby United	38	25	10	3	82	33	+49	85	
2	Belper Town	38	24	7	7	78	41	+37	79	Promoted to the Northern Premier League Division One
3	Brigg Town	38	23	8	7	80	43	+37	77	
4	North Ferriby United	38	21	9	8	86	36	+50	72	
5	Ossett Albion	38	21	8	9	73	36	+37	71	
6	Hucknall Town	38	19	8	11	84	48	+36	65	
7	Hallam	38	17	7	14	56	69	−13	58	
8	Ossett Town	38	14	11	13	52	53	−1	53	
9	Arnold Town	38	12	15	11	48	43	+5	51	
10	Glasshoughton Welfare	38	13	12	13	58	58	0	51	
11	Selby Town	38	14	9	15	63	69	−6	51	
12	Armthorpe Welfare	38	12	9	17	42	48	−6	45	
13	Thackley	38	12	9	17	43	58	−15	45	
14	Maltby Main	38	12	8	18	58	81	−23	44	
15	Pickering Town	38	11	8	19	45	72	−27	41	
16	Pontefract Collieries	38	8	11	19	44	73	−29	35	
17	Hatfield Main	38	8	10	20	40	75	−35	34	
18	Sheffield	38	7	11	20	50	70	−20	32	
19	Ashfield United	38	7	11	20	51	80	−29	32	Club folded
20	Liversedge	38	5	9	24	40	87	−47	24	

Source: fchd
Rules for classification: 1) points; 2) goal difference; 3) number of goals scored.

== Division One ==
Northern Counties East Football League Division One
- Season: 1996–97
- Champions: Eccleshill United
- Promoted: Eccleshill United
- Matches: 210
- Goals: 673 (3.2 per match)

Division One featured 14 clubs which competed in the previous season, along with one new club:

- Glapwell, joined from the Central Midlands League

=== League table ===
Pos	Team	Pld	W	D	L	GF	GA	GD	Pts	Promotion or relegation
1	Eccleshill United	28	21	4	3	81	30	+51	67	Promoted to the Premier Division
2	Garforth Town	28	20	4	4	57	22	+35	64	
3	Harrogate Railway Athletic	28	15	7	6	54	32	+22	52	
4	Yorkshire Amateur	28	15	4	9	52	52	0	49	
5	Glapwell	28	14	4	10	52	41	+11	46	
6	Borrowash Victoria	28	12	6	10	47	39	+8	42	
7	Hall Road Rangers	28	12	5	11	48	46	+2	41	
8	Louth United	28	9	9	10	47	37	+10	36	
9	Rossington Main	28	10	6	12	44	46	−2	36	
10	Worsbrough Bridge Miners Welfare	28	9	8	11	41	49	−8	35	
11	Parkgate	28	8	7	13	38	46	−8	31	
12	Winterton Rangers	28	7	9	12	39	51	−12	30	
13	Tadcaster Albion	28	4	10	14	20	51	−31	22	
14	Brodsworth Miners Welfare	28	4	5	19	22	58	−36	17	
15	Blidworth Welfare	28	4	4	20	31	73	−42	16	

Source: fchd
Rules for classification: 1) points; 2) goal difference; 3) number of goals scored.
