= Parkgate F.C. =

Association football club in England

Coordinates: 53°27′29″N 1°20′04″W

Parkgate Football Club
- Full name: Parkgate Football Club
- Nickname: The Steelmen
- Founded: 1969
- Ground: Roundwood Sports Complex; Parkgate, Rotherham; South Yorkshire
- Capacity: 1,425 (100 seats)
- Chairman: Albert Dudill
- Manager: Vacant
- League: Northern Counties East League Premier Division
- 2025–26: Northern Counties East League Premier Division, 11th of 20
- Website: www.parkgatefc.co.uk
Home colours

Parkgate Football Club is an English football club based in Parkgate, Rotherham, South Yorkshire. They play in the Northern Counties East Football League Division One, at level 10 of the English football league system.

== History ==
The club was established in 1969 as BSC Parkgate and played in the Hatchard and Sheffield Association leagues before joining the Yorkshire League in 1974. In 1979 they were promoted from Division Three to Division Two, and when the league merged with the Midland League to form the Northern Counties East League (NCEL) in 1982, Parkgate were entered into Division One South of the new competition.

In 1986 they were promoted to the NCEL Division One. Two years after changing their name to RES Parkgate in 1990, they installed floodlights, and in 1994 they changed their name again, this time to just Parkgate. The 1997–98 season saw Parkgate reach the final of the Sheffield & Hallamshire Senior Cup for the first time, losing to Emley at Hillsborough (they lost two further finals in 2006 and 2011).

They were promoted to the NCEL Premier Division in 2007 by winning the Division One title, and remained in the division until 2018, when relegated once more.

=== Season-by-season record ===
Season	Division	Level	Position	FA Cup	FA Vase	Notes
1970–71	Hatchard League Division Two	–	4th/13	-	-	Promoted
1971–72	Hatchard League Division One	–	1st/16	-	-	League champions
1972–73	Sheffield Association League Division Two	–	3rd/16	-	-	Promoted
1973–74	Sheffield Association League Division One	–	7th/16	-	-	
1974–75	Yorkshire League Division Three	–	9th/16	-	-	
1975–76	Yorkshire League Division Three	–	5th/16	-	1R	
1976–77	Yorkshire League Division Three	–	14th/16	-	PR	
1977–78	Yorkshire League Division Three	–	12th/16	-	1R	
1978–79	Yorkshire League Division Three	–	4th/16	-	PR	Promoted
1979–80	Yorkshire League Division Two	–	6th/16	-	1R	
1980–81	Yorkshire League Division Two	–	7th/16	-	PR	
1981–82	Yorkshire League Division Two	–	6th/16	-	PR	
1982–83	Northern Counties East League Division One South	–	7th/14	-	1R	
1983–84	Northern Counties East League Division One South	–	7th/14	-	PR	
1984–85	Northern Counties East League Division One Central	–	9th/14	-	PR	
1985–86	Northern Counties East League Division Two	–	9th/16	-	1R	Promoted
1986–87	Northern Counties East League Division One	–	15th/18	-	-	
1987–88	Northern Counties East League Division One	–	4th/16	-	-	
1988–89	Northern Counties East League Division One	–	12th/16	-	-	
1989–90	Northern Counties East League Division One	–	12th/15	-	-	
1990–91	Northern Counties East League Division One	–	9th/13	-	-	
1991–92	Northern Counties East League Division One	–	8th/16	-	EPR	
1992–93	Northern Counties East League Division One	–	5th/14	-	EPR	
1993–94	Northern Counties East League Division One	–	13th/15	-	2R	
1994–95	Northern Counties East League Division One	–	15th/16	-	1R	
1995–96	Northern Counties East League Division One	–	15th/16	-	2QR	
1996–97	Northern Counties East League Division One	–	11th/15	-	1R	
1997–98	Northern Counties East League Division One	–	5th/15	2QR	2QR	
1998–99	Northern Counties East League Division One	–	4th/13	2QR	1QR	
1999–00	Northern Counties East League Division One	–	12th/16	PR	1R	
2000–01	Northern Counties East League Division One	–	7th/16	PR	2QR	
2001–02	Northern Counties East League Division One	–	14th/16	PR	2QR	
2002–03	Northern Counties East League Division One	–	8th/17	PR	2QR	
2003–04	Northern Counties East League Division One	–	10th/18	PR	2QR	
2004–05	Northern Counties East League Division One	10	12th/16	PR	2QR	
2005–06	Northern Counties East League Division One	10	6th/16	PR	1R	
2006–07	Northern Counties East League Division One	10	1st/17	EPR	2R	League champions, promoted
2007–08	Northern Counties East League Premier Division	9	8th/20	1QR	1R	
2008–09	Northern Counties East League Premier Division	9	11th/20	EPR	2QR	
2009–10	Northern Counties East League Premier Division	9	14th/20	EPR	2QR	
2010–11	Northern Counties East League Premier Division	9	2nd/20	1QR	2QR	
2011–12	Northern Counties East League Premier Division	9	7th/20	1QR	3R	
2012–13	Northern Counties East League Premier Division	9	9th/22	EPR	3R	
2013–14	Northern Counties East League Premier Division	9	19th/23	EPR	2R	
2014–15	Northern Counties East League Premier Division	9	16th/21	EPR	1QR	
2015–16	Northern Counties East League Premier Division	9	17th/22	EPR	1QR	
2016–17	Northern Counties East League Premier Division	9	17th/22	PR	1QR	
2017–18	Northern Counties East League Premier Division	9	21st/22	PR	2QR	Relegated
2018–19	Northern Counties East League Division One	10	8th/20	1QR	2QR	
2019–20	Northern Counties East League Division One	10	–	–	1QR	League season abandoned due to COVID-19 pandemic
2020–21	Northern Counties East League Division One	10	–	–	2QR	League season abandoned due to COVID-19 pandemic
2021–22	Northern Counties East League Division One	10	8th/21	–	1R	
2022–23	Northern Counties East League Division One	10	14th/20	–	1QR	
2023–24	Northern Counties East League Division One	10	1st/23	–	1R	League champions, promoted
2024–25	Northern Counties East League Premier Division	9	11th/20	EPR	1QR	
2025–26	Northern Counties East League Premier Division	9	11th/20	PR	2QR	
Season	Division	Level	Position	FA Cup	FA Vase	Notes
Source: Football Club History Database

=== Notable former players ===
Players that have played in the Football League either before or after playing for Parkgate –

- Jimmy Ghaichem
- Kyle Nix
- Zephaniah Thomas
- Ben Starosta
- Simon Harrison

== Ground ==
The club plays at the Roundwood Sports Complex, off Green Lane, Rawmarsh, postcode S62 6LD.

== Honours ==
=== League ===
- Northern Counties East League Premier Division
  - Runners-up: 2010–11
- Northern Counties East League Division One
  - Champions: 2006–07, 2023–24
- Northern Counties East League Division Two
  - Promoted: 1985–86

=== Cup ===
- Sheffield & Hallamshire Senior Cup
  - Runners-up: 1997–98, 2005–06, 2010–11
- Northern Counties East League Cup
  - Winners: 2023–24
  - Runners-up: 2007–08
- Northern Counties East League Trophy
  - Winners: 2006–07
  - Runners-up: 1998–99
- Rotherham Charity Cup
  - Winners: 1983–84, 1998–99
  - Runners-up: 1996–97

== Records ==
- Best FA Cup performance: 2nd qualifying round, 1997–98, 1998–99
- Best FA Vase performance: 3rd round, 2011–12, 2012–13
- Record Attendance: 1536 v Rotherham United (Friendly), 2019
