= Jimmy Ghaichem =

English footballer (born 1984)

Personal information
- Full name: James Finnigan Ghaichem
- Date of birth: 11 April 1984 (age 42)
- Place of birth: Sheffield, England
- Position: Winger

Youth career
- 2000–2002: Mansfield Town
- Sheffield Wednesday

Senior career*
Years	Team	Apps	(Gls)
2006–2008	Peterborough United	2	(0)
2007	→ Rushden & Diamonds (loan)	1	(0)
2008	Belper Town		
2008–2009	Buxton		
2009	Worksop Town		
2009	Alfreton Town		
2009	Parkgate		
2009	Goole		
2009–2010	Harrogate Town	17	(3)
2010	Ilkeston Town	42	(8)
2010–2011	Parkgate		
- Scarborough Athletic
- Frickley Athletic
2014–	Scarborough Athletic		
- * Club domestic league appearances and goals

Jimmy Ghaichem (born 11 April 1984) is an English footballer, who plays as a winger.

== Career ==
Ghaichem was born in Sheffield. He began his career as a trainee at Mansfield Town before turning professional in 2005. He then had a brief spell at Sheffield Wednesday before joining Peterborough United in 2006. He made three appearances for Peterborough in all competitions and had a loan spell at Rushden & Diamonds before being released at the end of the 2007–08 season.

He then signed for Harrogate Town and made 26 appearances before joining Ilkeston Town in January 2010. He joined Scarborough Athletic in August 2011. Ghaichem made 36 appearances in the 2011–12 season, with his most memorable goal coming in a top of the table clash against Tadcaster Albion. At the end of the season he left to join Frickley Athletic where he made 37 appearances in the 2012–13 helping them secure their league status with a goal on the final day of the season against Worksop Town. He returned to Scarborough Athletic at the beginning of the 2014–15 campaign. He left Scarborough Athletic in January that year with the side in a play off place. He made 21 starts and scored 3 goals before following ex manager Rudy Funk to Afc Mansfield on a long-term contract.
