= Ian Richards (footballer) =

English footballer

- Ian Richards with Stocksbridge Park Steels

Personal information
- Date of birth: 5 October 1979 (age 47)

Team information
- Current team: Guiseley (manager)

Managerial career
- Years: Team
- 2010–2021: Penistone Church
- 2021–2025: Stocksbridge Park Steels
- 2025–: Guiseley

Ian Richards (born 5 October 1979) is an English former footballer. He is currently manager of Northern Premier League Premier Division club Guiseley.

== Playing career ==
He began his career with Blackburn Rovers but failed to make the first team and moved on to Halifax Town, where he made 24 Football League appearances. He has since gone on to play for non-league teams Belper Town and Stocksbridge Park Steels.

== Managerial career ==
In September 2021, following eleven years in charge of Penistone Church, Richards was appointed manager of Northern Premier League Division One East club Stocksbridge Park Steels.

On 30 October 2025, Richards was appointed manager of Northern Premier League Premier Division club Guiseley.

== Personal life ==
Alongside his career in management, Richards held the role of vice-principle at Penistone Grammar School.
