= Stocksbridge Park Steels F.C. =

English association football club

Coordinates: 53°28′38″N 1°35′13″W

Stocksbridge Park Steels
- Full name: Stocksbridge Park Steels Football Club
- Nickname: (The) Steels
- Founded: 1986
- Ground: Bracken Moor; Stocksbridge, Sheffield
- Capacity: 3,500 (450 seated)
- Chairman: Graham Furness
- Manager: Jason Blunt
- League: Northern Premier League Division One East
- 2025–26: Northern Premier League Premier Division, 21st of 21 (relegated)
- Website: stocksbridgeparksteels.co.uk
Home colours

Stocksbridge Park Steels Football Club is an English association football club based in Stocksbridge, South Yorkshire. They currently compete in the Northern Premier League Division One East. The club was formed in 1986 after a merger between two clubs, and uses a yellow and blue home kit. They play at the Bracken Moor ground.

They initially played in the Northern Counties East League and progressed through the NCEL's divisions before winning promotion to Division One of the Northern Premier League (NPL) in 1996. They reached the Premier Division of the NPL in 2009, but were relegated back to Division One South in 2014.

Steels have participated in the FA Cup every year since 1992, reaching the 4th qualifying round in 2003, and first entered the FA Trophy in 1996 after previously participating in the FA Vase.

== History ==
Stocksbridge Park Steels F.C. was formed in 1986 as the result of the merger of Stocksbridge Works, the works team of the local British Steel Corporation plant, and another local club, Oxley Park Sports. The new club was immediately admitted to the Northern Counties East League Division Two, the works club having previously played in Division Three of the same league.

The Steels spent five seasons in Division Two before being placed in Division One when the lower division was discontinued upon league re-organisation in 1991. In the same year, Mick Horne was appointed as the club's manager, and he led the team to the championship of Division One in the 1991–92 season.

In Stocksbridge's first season in the Premier Division the team finished near the bottom of the table, but in the 1993–94 season, the Steels became Northern Counties East League champions. The club failed to gain promotion to the Northern Premier League, however, as their stadium did not meet the required standard. The club finished second in the division two seasons later, losing the championship on goal difference to Hatfield Main, and on this occasion were admitted to the Northern Premier League Division One.

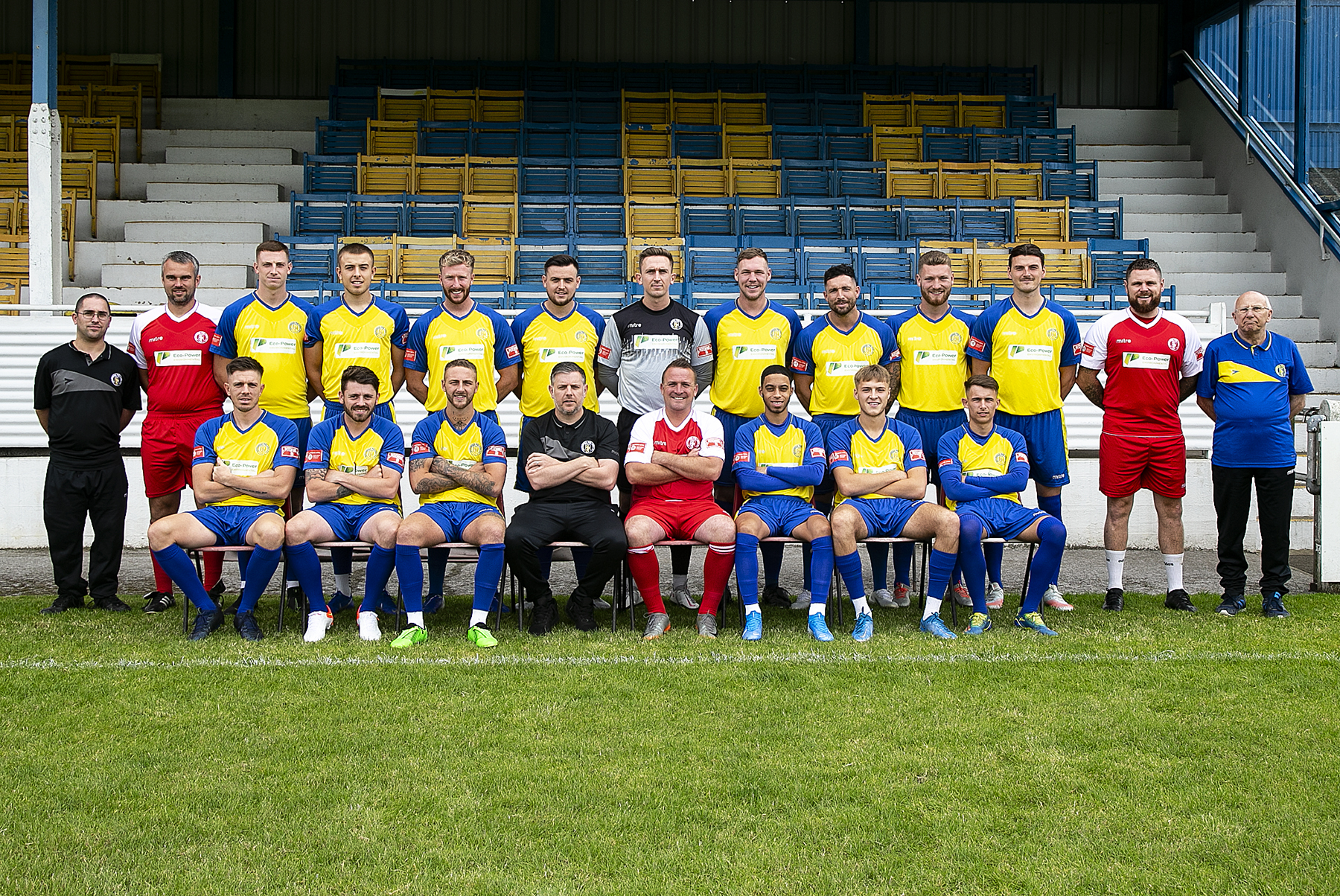
The Steels squad of 2021–22

Stocksbridge finished in the top half of the table in the club's first five seasons at the higher level, with a best finish of fourth place in the 2000–01 season, but the following season the Steels finished only two places from the bottom of the league. Shortly before the end of this season, manager Mick Horne tendered his resignation after 11 years in charge and was replaced by his assistant, former Norwich City player Wayne Biggins.

Under Biggins' management, the Steels had their best ever runs in both the FA Cup and FA Trophy and set a club record with a 17–1 defeat of Oldham Town in the FA Cup preliminary round in August 2002, but remained near the bottom of the league table. After the Steels were defeated 6–0 by Shildon in the final qualifying round of the 2003–04 FA Cup, Biggins attempted to resign but the board of directors persuaded him to continue in his job. However, he left in November 2003, with the club again fighting a battle against relegation.

Former assistant manager of local rivals Worksop Town Peter Rinkcavage was appointed as Stocksbridge's new manager, and in the 2005–06 season he led the team to a sixth-place finish, sufficient to qualify for the play-offs for promotion to the Northern Premier League Premier Division. After holding Kendal Town to a 1–1 draw in the semi-final, the Steels lost a penalty shoot-out, ending their hopes of promotion.

The following season Stocksbridge again finished in sixth place, although with only two teams promoted, it was not high enough to qualify for the play-offs. Stocksbridge did, however, defeat Worksop Town to win the Sheffield and Hallamshire Senior Cup. Following this win, manager Rinkcavage resigned in order to return to his former club, Worksop, as manager, with Gary Marrow replacing him for the 2007–08 season, for which the club was placed in the Southern section of the now-regionalised Division One. Stocksbridge again qualified for the play-offs, but lost to Sheffield. In the 2008–09 season, the Steels again qualified for the play-offs and defeated Belper Town in the final to gain promotion to the Northern Premier League Premier Division for the first time. During the following season, Marrow resigned as manager and was replaced by Simon Collins. The Steels spent five years in the Premier Division, never finishing out of the bottom half of the table, and were relegated at the end of the 2013–14 season.

In 2017, Stocksbridge qualified for the end of season play-offs in their bid to return to the Premier Division, but were beaten in the semi-finals by Spalding United. Geographical re-organisation of the NPL saw them play in Division One East in 2018–19, and Division One South East in 2019–20. The 2024–25 season saw the club promoted back to step three as Division One East play-off winners.

Bracken Moor before a friendly fixture against Sheffield Wednesday in 2013

=== Season-by-season record ===
Season	Division	Level	Position	FA Cup	FA Trophy	FA Vase	Notes
1986–87	Northern Counties East League Division Two	-	7th/18	-	-	-	
1987–88	Northern Counties East League Division Two	-	8th/15	-	-	-	
1988–89	Northern Counties East League Division Two	-	9th/14	-	-	-	
1989–90	Northern Counties East League Division Two	-	7th/14	-	-	-	
1990–91	Northern Counties East League Division Two	-	7th/13	-	-	PR	Promoted
1991–92	Northern Counties East League Division One	-	1st/16	-	-	1R	League champions, promoted
1992–93	Northern Counties East League Premier Division	-	16th/20	1QR	-	2R	
1993–94	Northern Counties East League Premier Division	-	1st/20	PR	-	1R	League champions
1994–95	Northern Counties East League Premier Division	-	3rd/20	PR	-	4R	
1995–96	Northern Counties East League Premier Division	-	2nd/20	PR	-	1R	Promoted
1996–97	Northern Premier League Division One	-	6th/22	2QR	3QR	-	
1997–98	Northern Premier League Division One	-	11th/22	1QR	1QR	-	
1998–99	Northern Premier League Division One	-	10th/22	2QR	1R	-	
1999–2000	Northern Premier League Division One	-	9th/22	1QR	3R	-	
2000–01	Northern Premier League Division One	-	4th/22	2QR	1R	-	
2001–02	Northern Premier League Division One	-	20th/22	3QR	1R	-	
2002–03	Northern Premier League Division One	-	17th/22	2QR	1R	-	
2003–04	Northern Premier League Division One	-	19th/22	4QR	2R	-	
2004–05	Northern Premier League Division One	8	14th/22	PR	1R	-	
2005–06	Northern Premier League Division One	8	6th/22	1QR	1QR	-	
2006–07	Northern Premier League Division One	8	6th/24	PR	PR	-	
2007–08	Northern Premier League Division One South	8	5th/18	2QR	2QR	-	
2008–09	Northern Premier League Division One South	8	3rd/20	2QR	2QR	-	Promoted (play-off winners)
2009–10	Northern Premier League Premier Division	7	11th/20	2QR	1QR	-	
2010–11	Northern Premier League Premier Division	7	13th/22	2QR	3QR	-	
2011–12	Northern Premier League Premier Division	7	18th/22	3QR	1QR	-	
2012–13	Northern Premier League Premier Division	7	20th/22	1QR	1QR	-	
2013–14	Northern Premier League Premier Division	7	23rd/24	1QR	1QR	-	Relegated
2014–15	Northern Premier League Division One South	8	17th/22	PR	PR	-	
2015–16	Northern Premier League Division One South	8	7th/22	PR	1R	-	
2016–17	Northern Premier League Division One South	8	4th/22	PR	1R	-	
2017–18	Northern Premier League Division One South	8	11th/22	PR	PR	-	
2018–19	Northern Premier League Division One East	8	13th/22	PR	PR	-	
2019–20	Northern Premier League Division One South East	8	–	PR	PR	-	League season abandoned due to COVID-19 pandemic
2020–21	Northern Premier League Division One South East	8	–	PR	2QR	-	League season abandoned due to COVID-19 pandemic
2021–22	Northern Premier League Division One East	8	11th/19	PR	2QR	-	
2022–23	Northern Premier League Division One East	8	5th/20	3QR	1QR	-	
2023–24	Northern Premier League Division One East	8	15th/20	PR	3QR	-	
2024–25	Northern Premier League Division One East	8	3rd/22	1QR	3QR	-	Promoted (play-off winners)
2025–26	Northern Premier League Premier Division	7	21st/21	2QR	2R	-	Relegated
Season	Division	Level	Position	FA Cup	FA Trophy	FA Vase	Notes
Source: Football Club History Database

== Colours and crest ==
The club crest prior to 2011 (left) and that used by the supporters club from 2006–2011 (right)

The Steels have generally worn a kit of yellow shirts with varying amounts of blue trim, blue shorts, and yellow stockings during their short history. The club badge is predominantly yellow and blue to reflect this, and features a representation of a clock tower located on Nanny Hill, near the club's stadium. The alternative crest was in use by the supporters club from 2006 to 2011 but was never adopted by the club. The official crest was redesigned in 2022 . The club is unusual in having an alternate crest for its away shirts with the colours reversed. The team's nickname is "Steels" or "The Steels".

== Stadium ==
The Steels have always played their games at Bracken Moor, the former home of Stocksbridge Works. In 2006, it was announced that the stadium was to be sponsored by local newspaper Look Local for a term of five years, resulting in its official name being changed to the Look Local Stadium, a deal which was later extended to 2013. This was changed to the Eco-Power Stadium in the summer of 2020, when Eco Power Environmental became the club's biggest sponsor The stadium has a maximum capacity of 3,500, with 450 seats.

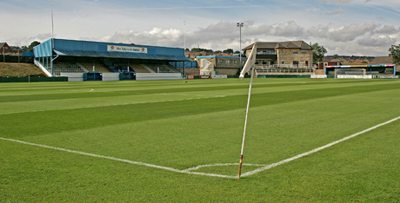
The south-west corner of the ground, with club house (left), the pitch and main stand (centre), and the view looking north-east from the clubhouse (right)

The ground was a cricket pitch until shortly after the Second World War, when it was purchased by a local steelmaking company and converted into a football stadium. Stone-built changing rooms were erected in the mid-1960s, replacing a small hut, as was a seated stand and terracing. The main stand has a distinctive angled awning which extends from the fascia and seats which came from Sheffield Wednesday's Hillsborough Stadium. Floodlights were installed at the stadium in 1990 and the terracing partially covered four years later.

As one side of the ground directly adjoins a cricket pitch, the club was required to erect a dividing fence in order to gain entry to the Northern Premier League. The fence was temporary in nature and was removed during the cricket season, however when the cricket club merged with another local side the cricket pitch stopped being used and the fence became a permanent fixture. It was partially funded by money raised from friendlies against Sheffield Wednesday and Sheffield United.

== Current squad ==
As of 21 August 2026

Note: Flags indicate national team as defined under FIFA eligibility rules; some limited exceptions apply. Players may hold more than one non-FIFA nationality.

No.	Pos.	Nation	Player
—	GK	ENG	Sam Orioye
—	GK	ENG	Ben Townsend
—	DF	ENG	Chris Bumhira
—	DF	ENG	Tom Charlesworth
—	DF	ENG	Jack Dolman
—	DF	ENG	Finlay Dyer
—	DF	ENG	Charlie Oglesby
—	DF	ENG	Will Sutton
—	MF	ENG	Luke Hogg
—	MF	ENG	Oliver Metcalfe
—	MF	ENG	Deshaun Musgrave-Dore

No.	Pos.	Nation	Player
—	MF	AUS	Alex O'Connor
—	MF	ENG	Tomas Poole
—	MF	ENG	Connor Smythe
—	MF	ENG	Louis Ward
—	FW	ENG	Reece Clegg
—	FW	ENG	Romario Dunne
—	FW	MSR	Josiah Dyer
—	FW	ENG	Matty Lee
—	FW	ENG	Mo Malumo
—	FW	ENG	Tommy Marshall
—	FW	ENG	Harry Spooner

== Supporters ==
The average attendance at the Look Local Stadium was 180 in the 2008–09 season, the ninth highest of twenty teams in the Northern Premier League Division One South, with the largest attendance being 451 for the visit of Sheffield. The average figure was a decrease of 3 compared to the previous season. The highest attendance in the club's history was 2,000, for a friendly match against Sheffield Wednesday to mark the inauguration of the ground's floodlights in October 1991.

The club has a Supporters' Club which was set up in the mid-1990s. The Supporters' Club organises events to raise funds for the football club, and operates the club shop at the Look Local Stadium.

=== Rivalries ===
Frickley Athletic and Worksop Town are considered to be local rivals to the Steels. Stocksbridge's highest ever league attendance against their rivals is 610 for a match against Worksop.

== Managers ==
From	To	Manager
1986	1991	
1991	2002	Mick Horne
2002	2003	Wayne Biggins
2003	2007	Peter Rinkcavage
2007	2009	Gary Marrow
2009	2010	Simon Collins
2010	2010	Steve Shutt

From	To	Manager
2010	2011	Gary Marrow
2011	2012	Chris Willcock
2012	2014	Darren Schofield
2014	2021	Chris Hilton
2021	2025	Ian Richards
2025	2026	Jordan Lemon
2026	present	Jason Blunt

== Honours ==
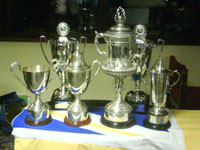
The trophies won by the club's first team, reserves and youths in 2006–07. The Sheffield and Hallamshire Senior Cup is the third trophy from the right.

Honour	Year(s)
Northern Counties East League; Premier Division champions	1993–94
Northern Counties East League; Division One champions	1991–92
Northern Counties East League; League Cup winners	1994–95
Sheffield and Hallamshire Senior Cup winners	1992–93, 1995–96, 1998–99, 2006–07, 2008–09
Northern Premier League; Challenge Cup finalists	2005–06
Northern Premier League Division One South; Play-Off winners	2008–09

== Records ==
Stocksbridge's best league finish was a fourth-place finish in the Northern Premier League Division One, which at the time sat at the seventh level in the overall English football league system, in the 2000–01 season. The largest number of points the team has registered in a season was 76 in the 2006–07 season, but that was only enough to secure a sixth-place finish.

The club's best performance in the FA Cup was an appearance in the fourth and final qualifying round in the 2003–04 season. After winning four matches to progress from the preliminary round, the Steels lost 6–0 away to Shildon. In the same season the club achieved its best performance in the FA Trophy, reaching the second round proper only to lose 4–2 away to Blyth Spartans.

The club's record victory was a 17–1 win over Oldham Town in the FA Cup in 2002. Striker Paul Jackson scored ten of the goals, equalling the 55-year-old record for the most goals scored by a single player in an FA Cup match. Ted McDougall's nine goals for AFC Bournemouth against Margate in 1971 remains the record in the FA Cup proper, whereas Jackson's ten is the record for the qualifying rounds. The Steels' record defeat was a 7–2 loss to Witton Albion in the 2001–02 season.

The record for the most appearances for the club is held by Gary Hurlestone with 254. The club's all-time record goalscorer is Trevor Jones, who scored 145 times for the Steels. The largest transfer fee paid for a Stocksbridge player is £15,000, paid by Wolverhampton Wanderers for Lee Mills in December 1992.
