= Guiseley A.F.C. =

Association football club in Guiseley, England

- Full name: Guiseley Association Football Club
- Nickname: The Lions
- Founded: 1909
- Ground: Nethermoor Park
- Capacity: 4,000
- Chairman: Gary Douglas
- Manager: Ian Richards
- League: Northern Premier League Premier Division
- 2025–26: Northern Premier League Premier Division, 13th of 21
- Website: guiseleyafc.co.uk
Home colours	Away colours

Guiseley Association Football Club is a football club based in Guiseley, Leeds, West Yorkshire, England. They are currently members of the Northern Premier League Premier Division, the seventh tier of English football, and play at Nethermoor Park.

== History ==
The club was established in 1909 and initially played in the Wharfedale League. They were league champions in 1912–13, and after World War I the club transferred to the Leeds League. In 1924 they moved leagues again, this time joining the West Riding County Amateur League. They went on to win three consecutive league titles between 1932–33 and 1934–35, before finishing as runners-up in 1937–38 and then winning the league again in 1938–39.

When the league was split into two divisions in 1953, Guiseley became members of Section A. They were runners-up in 1954–55 and won the division in 1955–56. In 1960 they switched back to the Leeds League, joining Division One of the league, now known as the West Yorkshire League. They were Division One champions in their first season, and after finishing as runners-up in 1963–64, they won the league again in 1964–65.

In 1968 Guiseley joined Division Two of the Yorkshire League. League restructuring saw them demoted to Division Three in 1970, but a fourth-place finish in 1970–71 resulted in an immediate promotion back to Division Two. Another fourth-place finish in 1973–74 earned the club promotion to Division One. Although they were relegated at the end of the following season, they won Division Two in 1975–76, earning an immediate promotion back to Division One. The club went on to finish as Division One runners-up in 1979–80 and 1980–81. In 1981 the league merged with the Midland League to form the Northern Counties East League, with Guiseley placed in the Premier Division.

The late 1980s and early 1990s was another successful period for Guiseley. In 1989–90 they reached the semi-finals of the FA Vase for the first time, losing 4–0 on aggregate to Bridlington Town. They reached the final the following season, beating Gresley Rovers 3–1 in a replay at Bramall Lane after the first match at Wembley had ended in a 4–4 draw. They also won the Northern Counties East League Premier Division, earning promotion to Division One of the Northern Premier League. They had the opportunity to retain the FA Vase in 1991–92 when they reached the final again, but lost 5–3 to Wimborne Town. The season also saw them reach the first round of the FA Cup for the first time, losing 1–0 to Third Division Chester City.

In 1993–94 Guiseley won Division One of the Northern Premier League, earning promotion to the Premier Division. They also reached the semi-finals of the FA Trophy, losing 2–1 on aggregate to Runcorn, as well as becoming the first Division One team to win the league's President's Cup. They reached the first round of the FA Cup again in 1994–95 and lost 4–1 at home to Carlisle United in a match that was moved to Valley Parade in Bradford; the attendance of 6,548 remains a club record. After a third-place finish in 1998–99, the club were relegated to Division One the following season, although they did reach the first round of the FA Cup again, losing 6–0 at Forest Green Rovers. In 2002–03 another first round FA Cup appearance ended with a 4–0 defeat at Luton Town. A ninth-place finish in 2003–04 was enough to earn a return to the Premier Division due to league restructuring caused by the creation of the Conference North and South. In 2008–09 the club won the league's Challenge Cup and finished fourth in the Premier Division, qualifying for the promotion play-offs. However, they were beaten 2–1 by Nantwich Town in the semi-finals. The following season saw the club win the Premier Division, earning promotion to the Conference North.

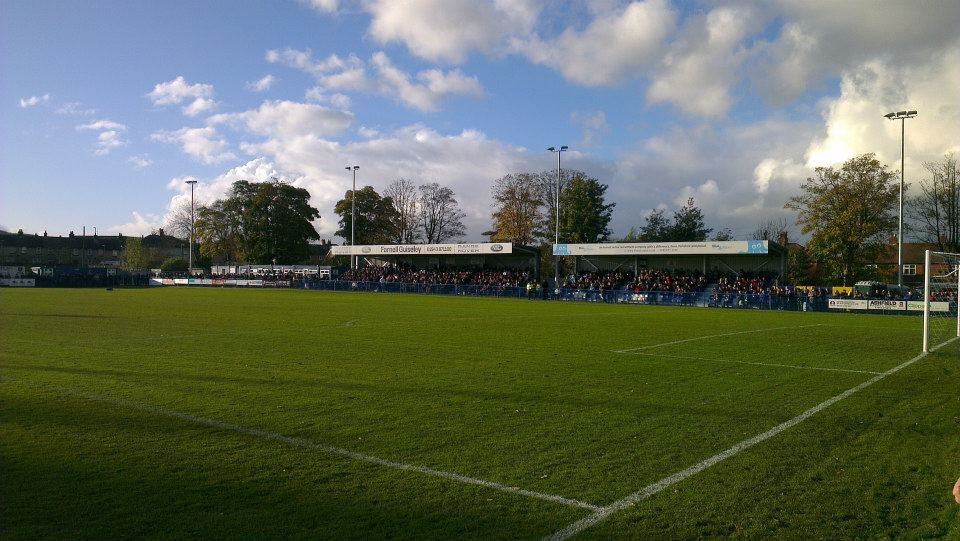
Nethermoor Park

The next five seasons saw Guiseley qualify for the promotion play-offs on each occasion; in 2010–11 they defeated Boston United on penalties in the semi-finals after a 1–0 win in the home leg, which was cancelled out by losing 3–2 away, but were then beaten 3–2 by AFC Telford United in the final on 15 May; they also reached the FA Cup first round again, losing 5–0 at home to Crawley Town. They lost 2–1 on aggregate to Nuneaton Town in the play-off semi-finals in 2011–12 and 3–1 on aggregate to FC Halifax Town in the 2012–13 semi-finals, a season that also saw another FA Cup first round appearance, losing 1–0 in a replay to Barrow. In 2013–14 they reached the final after beating North Ferriby United 3–0 on aggregate in the semi-finals, but lost 2–1 to Altrincham in the final. In 2014–15 the club defeated AFC Fylde 3–1 on aggregate in the semi-finals before winning 3–2 against Chorley in the final, having been 2-0 down, to finally earn promotion to the Conference National, which was subsequently renamed the National League.

Guiseley reached the second round of the FA Cup for the first time in 2017–18 after defeating Accrington Stanley 4–3 on penalties in a first round replay, before losing 3–0 to Mansfield Town in the second round. They were relegated back to the (renamed) National League North at the end of the season, having finished bottom of the National League. In 2018–19 the club reached the second round of the FA Cup again after beating Cambridge United 4–3 in the first round. They finished bottom of the National League North in 2021–22 and were relegated to the Premier Division of the Northern Premier League.

== Ground ==
The club has played at Nethermoor Park since its establishment. It currently has a capacity of 4,000.

== Current squad ==
As of 19 August 2026

Note: Flags indicate national team as defined under FIFA eligibility rules; some limited exceptions apply. Players may hold more than one non-FIFA nationality.

No.	Pos.	Nation	Player
—	GK	ENG	Jack Hall
—	GK	ENG	Michael Roxburgh
—	DF	ENG	Ollie Brown
—	DF	ENG	Paul Iggulden
—	DF	ENG	Lebrun Mbeka
—	DF	ENG	Lucas Odunston
—	DF	ENG	Elliot Owen
—	DF	ENG	Jack Tinker
—	DF	ENG	Kyle White
—	MF	ENG	Derren Boyle
—	MF	ENG	Jack Emmett

No.	Pos.	Nation	Player
—	MF	ENG	Harrison Hopper
—	MF	ENG	Adam Lund
—	MF	ENG	Charlie Staniland
—	FW	ENG	Amir Berchil
—	FW	ENG	Will Longbottom
—	FW	ENG	Aaron Martin
—	FW	IRL	Kallan Murphy
—	FW	ENG	Jay Rollins
—	FW	ENG	Frankie Sinfield
—	FW	ENG	Jordan Thewlis
—	FW	ENG	Cameron Wilson

== Honours ==
- Northern Premier League
  - Premier Division champions 2009–10
  - Division One champions 1993–94
  - Challenge Cup winners 2008–09
  - President's Cup winners 1993–94
- FA Vase
  - Winners 1990–91
- Northern Counties East League
  - Premier Division champions 1990–91
- Yorkshire League
  - Division Two champions 1975–76
- West Riding County Amateur League
  - Champions 1932–33, 1933–34, 1934–35, 1938–39, 1955–56
- West Yorkshire League
  - Division One champions 1960–61, 1964–65
- Wharfedale League
  - Champions 1912–13
- West Riding County Cup
  - Winners 1978–79, 1979–80, 1980–81, 1982–83, 1993–94, 1995–96, 2004–05, 2010–11, 2011–12

== Records ==
- Best FA Cup performance: Second round, 2017–18, 2018–19, 2026–27
- Best FA Trophy performance: Semi-finals, 1993–94
- Best FA Vase performance: Winners, 1990–91
- Record attendance:
  - At Valley Parade: 6,548 vs Carlisle United, 1994–95
  - At Nethermoor Park: 3,000 vs Leeds United, friendly, 8 July 2017

== See also ==
- Guiseley A.F.C. Vixens (women's team)
- Guiseley A.F.C. players
- Guiseley A.F.C. managers
