= Arnold Town F.C. =

Association football club in England

Coordinates: 53°02′25.35″N 1°07′16.03″W

Arnold Town
- Full name: Arnold Town Football Club
- Nickname: The Eagles
- Founded: 1989
- Ground: Eagle Valley, Arnold
- Chairman: Steve Holland
- Manager: Ash White and Scott Baxter
- League: Nottinghamshire Senior League Premier Division
- 2024–25: Central Midlands Alliance Premier Division South, 11th of 17 (transferred)
Home colours	Away colours

Arnold Town Football Club is a football club based in Arnold, Nottinghamshire, England. They are currently members of the Nottinghamshire Senior League Premier Division and play at Eagle Valley.

== History ==
Arnold Town was formed in 1989 by a merger of Arnold F.C. and Arnold Kingswell, adopting the yellow of Arnold and the blue of Kingswell as club colours. The new club took over from Arnold in the Central Midlands League Supreme Division, finishing third in their first season. The 1992–93 season saw the club win the Nottinghamshire Senior Cup, beating Rainworth Miners Welfare 3–1 in the final, as well as winning the Supreme Division, earning promotion to Division One of the Northern Counties East League. They went on to win Division One at the first attempt, earning promotion to the Premier Division. The 1994–95 season saw them finish second in the Premier Division and win the President's Cup.

In the 1995–96 season, Arnold Town successfully defended the Nottinghamshire Senior Cup for a second time after beating Boots Athletic 2–0, The following season saw the same two clubs contest the final, with Arnold winning 1–0. A fourth Cup was won in 1998–99 with a 2–1 win over Hucknall Town, and a fifth came in 2004–05 when Eastwood Town were beaten 1–0. In 2012–13 the club finished 19th in the Premier Division following a 10-point deduction due to financial problems, and were relegated to the East Midlands Counties League. In 2018–19 they finished bottom of the East Midlands Counties League and were relegated to the Central Midlands League South Division. In 2023 the division was renamed the Premier Division South.

At the end of the 2024–25 season Arnold transferred to the Premier Division of the Nottinghamshire Senior League.

=== Season-by-season record ===
Season	Division	Position	Significant events
1989–90	Central Midlands League Supreme Division	3/20	
1990–91	Central Midlands League Supreme Division	4/17	
1991–92	Central Midlands League Supreme Division	8/18	
1992–93	Central Midlands League Supreme Division	1/16	Promoted
1993–94	Northern Counties East League Division One	1/15	Promoted
1994–95	Northern Counties East League Premier Division	2/20	
1995–96	Northern Counties East League Premier Division	13/20	
1996–97	Northern Counties East League Premier Division	9/20	
1997–98	Northern Counties East League Premier Division	14/20	
1998–99	Northern Counties East League Premier Division	7/20	
1999–2000	Northern Counties East League Premier Division	8/20	
2000–01	Northern Counties East League Premier Division	6/20	
2001–02	Northern Counties East League Premier Division	10/20	
2002–03	Northern Counties East League Premier Division	15/20	
2003–04	Northern Counties East League Premier Division	18/20	
2004–05	Northern Counties East League Premier Division	16/20	
2005–06	Northern Counties East League Premier Division	5/20	
2006–07	Northern Counties East League Premier Division	15/20	
2007–08	Northern Counties East League Premier Division	10/20	
2008–09	Northern Counties East League Premier Division	6/20	
2009–10	Northern Counties East League Premier Division	8/20	
2010–11	Northern Counties East League Premier Division	18/20	
2011–12	Northern Counties East League Premier Division	9/22	
2012–13	Northern Counties East League Premier Division	19/22	Demoted
2013–14	East Midlands Counties League	6/19	
2014–15	East Midlands Counties League	10/20	
2015–16	East Midlands Counties League	18/19	
2016–17	East Midlands Counties League	15/22	
2017–18	East Midlands Counties League	20/22	
2018–19	East Midlands Counties League	20/20	Relegated
2019–20	Central Midlands League South Division	–	Season abandoned due to COVID-19
2020–21	Central Midlands League South Division	–	Season abandoned due to COVID-19
2021–22	Central Midlands League South Division	16/17	
2022–23	Central Midlands League South Division	11/16	
2023–24	Central Midlands League Premier Division South	14/18	

== Ground ==
Arnold Town initially played at the King George V Ground, usually referred to as Gedling Road, until the 2007–08 season. They had hoped to move to the Eagle Valley Complex at the start of the 2008–09 season, but due to delays in the completion of the ground, they played their home matches at various grounds including Gedling Miners Welfare, Gedling Town, Carlton Town and Dunkirk.

The Eagle Valley complex was completed in 2009, with the first match played on 24 January against Thackley resulting in a 3–2 win for Arnold in front of a crowd of 238.

== Honours ==
- Northern Counties East League
  - Division One champions 1993–94
  - President's Cup winners 1994–95
- Central Midlands League
  - Supreme Division champions 1992–93
- Notts Senior Cup
  - Winners 1992–93, 1995–96, 1996–97, 1998–99, 2004–05
- Wakefield Cup
  - Winners 1989–90

== Records ==
- Most appearances: Lee Broster, 364
- Best FA Cup performance: Fourth qualifying round, 2002–03
- Best FA Vase performance: Fifth round, 2001–02, 2005–06

== See also ==
- Arnold Town F.C. players
- Arnold Town F.C. managers
