= Louth United F.C. =

Coordinates: 53°22′42.47″N 0°08′28.89″E

Louth United
- Full name: Louth United Football Club
- Short name: Louth Utd
- Founded: 1947
- Dissolved: 2007
- Ground: Marshlands, Saltfleetby
Home colours

Louth United F.C. was a football club from Louth, Lincolnshire. They became defunct in 2007 after running into severe financial difficulties. Louth Town F.C. took over the running of all junior sides and no senior teams exist in the name of Louth United. Founded in 1947, from a merger of Louth Nats and Louth Town, they had been members of the Northern Counties East League and the Central Midlands League Premier Division, but in 2007 dropped down to the Lincolnshire League.

Louth United were based at their new home, Marshlands, which was developed and opened in 2008. This facility is now the home of Louth Town F.C..
