= Brigg Town F.C. =

Football club based in Brigg, Lincolnshire, England

Coordinates: 53°33′28.840″N 0°29′6.310″W

Brigg Town
- Full name: Brigg Town Football Club
- Nickname: The Zebras
- Founded: 1864
- Ground: The Hawthorns, Brigg
- Capacity: 2,500 (370 seated)
- Manager: Martin Pembleton and Stephen McCarron
- League: Northern Counties East League Division One
- 2024–25: Northern Counties East League Division One, 7th of 22
- Website: http://www.briggtownfccic.co.uk
Home colours	Away colours

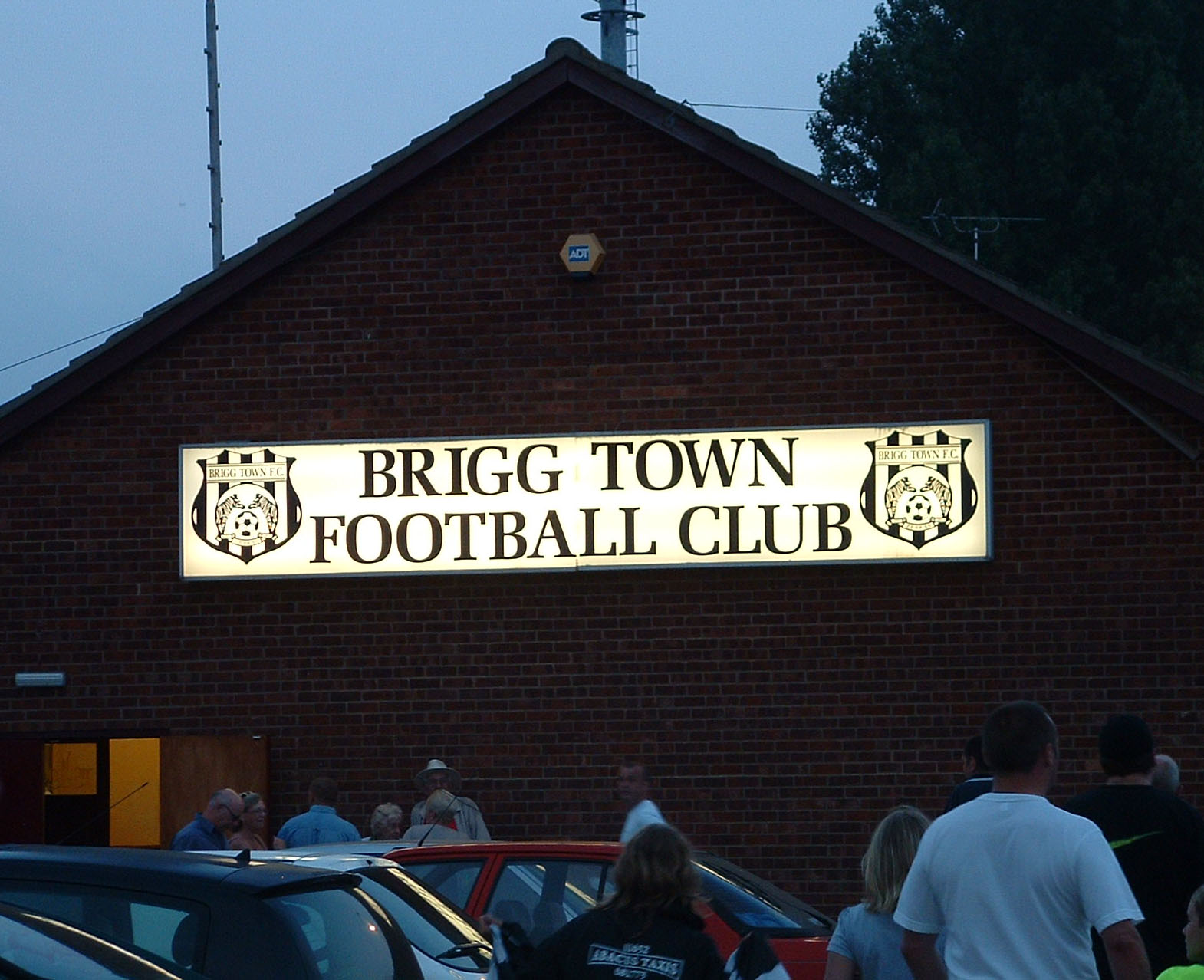
An exterior shot of The Hawthorns

Brigg Town Football Club CIC is a football club based in Brigg, Lincolnshire, England. They are currently members of the Northern Counties East League Division One and play at the Hawthorns. Established in 1864, they are one of the oldest football clubs in the world.

== History ==
The club was established in 1864. In 1881–82 they entered the inaugural Lincolnshire Senior Cup, reaching the final where they lost to Spilsby. They reached the final again the following season, again losing to Spilsby. They joined the Lindsey League and in 1948 became founder members of the Lincolnshire League. They won the league in 1949–50, 1953–54, 1968–69, 1969–70, 1970–71, 1971–72, 1973–74 and 1975–76 and were runners-up in 1950–51, 1961–62, 1963–64, 1965–66, 1974–75.

After their eighth title in 1976, Brigg moved up to the Midland League and were placed in the Premier Division. After finishing third in their first season in the league, they were champions in 1977–78. When the league merged with the Yorkshire League to form the Northern Counties East League in 1982, Brigg were placed in Division One South. They were relegated to Division Two South at the end of the league's first season, but finished as runners-up the following season, earning promotion to Division One Central. League reorganisation in 1985 saw them placed in Division One, and they were promoted to the Premier Division at the end of the 1985–86 season despite only finishing twelfth.

In 1995–96 Brigg reached the final of the FA Vase, beating Clitheroe 3–0 at Wembley Stadium to lift the trophy. After finishing as Premier Division runners-up in 1999–2000, Brigg were champions in 2000–01, but were unable to take promotion due to the Hawthorns not being up to the required standard. They were runners-up again for the next two seasons, and in 2001–02 they reached the first round of the FA Cup, losing 4–1 at Tranmere Rovers. In 2002–03 they reached the FA Vase final again and won the trophy for a second time with a 2–1 win against AFC Sudbury in a match played at Upton Park. A third-place finish in 2003–04 saw them promoted to Division One of the Northern Premier League. When the league was reorganised in 2007 they were placed in Division One South

Brigg were relegated back to the Premier Division of the Northern Counties East League at the end of the 2014–15 season after finishing bottom of Division One South. The 2015–16 season saw them relegated again, this time to Division One of the Northern Counties East League. In 2017–18 they finished second-from-bottom of Division One and were relegated to the Lincolnshire League. In 2018–19 the club won the Lincolnshire Junior Cup, defeating Horncastle Town 3–1 in the final, and were runners-up in the Lincolnshire League, resulting in promotion back to Division One of the Northern Counties East League. The 2021–22 season saw them win the Lincolnshire Senior Trophy with a 1–0 win over Winterton Rangers.

== Ground ==
The club played at the Old Manor House Convent playing fields on Station Road until 1939. They then moved to Brocklesby Ox, where the club's record attendance of 2,000 against Boston United was set in 1953. In 1959 they moved to the Hawthorns.

== Honours ==
- Northern Counties East League
  - Premier Division champions 2000–01
- Midland League
  - Champions 1977–78
- Lincolnshire League
  - Champions 1949–50, 1953–54, 1968–69, 1969–70, 1970–71, 1971–72, 1973–74, 1975–76
- FA Vase
  - Winners 1995–96, 2002–03
- Lincolnshire Senior Trophy
  - Winners 2021–22
- Lincolnshire Junior Cup
  - Winners 2018–19
- Barton Cup
  - Winners 2016–17
- Ian "Chalkie" Whyte Memorial Cup
  - Winners 2020–21

== Records ==
- Best FA Cup performance: First round, 1879–80, 1880–81, 1881–82, 2001–02
- Best FA Trophy performance: Second qualifying round, 1972–73, 2009–10, 2013–14
- Record attendance: 2,000 vs Boston United, 1953

== See also ==
- Brigg Town F.C. players
- Brigg Town F.C. managers
