= 1999–2000 FA Cup qualifying rounds =

Tournament details
- Country: England; Scotland; Wales

The 1999–2000 FA Cup qualifying rounds opened the 119th season of competition in England for 'The Football Association Challenge Cup' (FA Cup), the world's oldest association football single knockout competition. A total of 579 clubs participated in the competition after Manchester United, who were the winners the previous season, decided not enter.

The large number of clubs entering the tournament meant that the competition started with preliminary and four qualifying knockouts for these non-League teams. The 32 winning teams from Fourth qualifying round progressed to the First round proper, where League teams tiered at Levels 3 and 4 entered the competition.

== Calendar ==
Round	Start date	Leagues entering at this round	New entries this round	Winners from previous round	Number of fixtures
Preliminary round	21 August 1999	Isthmian League; Northern Premier League; Southern League (except Premier divisions)	394	none	197
Preliminary round	21 August 1999	Combined Counties League; Eastern Counties League; Essex Senior League; Hellenic League; Kent League; Midland Alliance; North West Counties League; Northern Counties East League; Northern League; South Western Football League; Spartan South Midlands League; Sussex County League; United Counties League; Wessex League; Western League	394	none	197
First qualifying round	4 September 1999	none	5	197	101
Second qualifying round	18 September 1999	Isthmian League; Northern Premier League; Southern Football League (Premier divisions)	67	101	84
Third qualifying round	2 October 1999	none	none	84	42
Fourth qualifying round	16 October 1999	Football Conference	22	42	32

== Preliminary round ==
Matches were played on weekend of Saturday 21 August 1999. A total of 394 clubs took part in this stage of the competition, 88 clubs from the four divisions at Level 7 of English football and 306 clubs from fifteen lower level leagues.

Tie	Home team (tier)	Score	Away team (tier)
1	Shildon (9)	1–3	Thornaby-On-Tees (8)
2	Glasshoughton Welfare (8)	0–1	Hebburn (9)
3	Brandon United (9)	0–3	Ossett Town (7)
4	Bradford Park Avenue (7)	1–0	Prescot Cables (8)
5	Workington (7)	1–2	Burscough (7)
6	Garforth Town (8)	0–4	Armthorpe Welfare (8)
7	Dunston Federation Brewery (8)	1–0	Maine Road (8)
8	Atherton Collieries (8)	1–2	Ramsbottom United (8)
9	Marske United (8)	1–1	Ashington (9)
replay	Ashington (9)	1–2	Marske United (8)
10	Cheadle Town (8)	0–3	Warrington Town (9)
11	Morpeth Town (8)	2–1	Harrogate Town (7)
12	Tow Law Town (8)	6–0	Tadcaster Albion (9)
13	Chester-le-Street Town (8)	1–3	St Helens Town (8)
14	Hallam (8)	1–2	Liversedge (8)
15	Billingham Town (8)	1–2	Fleetwood Freeport (8)
16	Farsley Celtic (7)	1–1	Guisborough Town (8)
replay	Guisborough Town (8)	0–1	Farsley Celtic (7)
17	Accrington Stanley (7)	3–0	Peterlee Newtown (8)
18	Rossendale United (8)	2–0	Chadderton (9)
19	Netherfield Kendal (7)	3–0	Oldham Town (9)
20	Harrogate Railway Athletic (8)	1–0	Willington (9)
21	Bootle (8)	0–0	Jarrow Roofing BCA (8)
replay	Jarrow Roofing BCA (8)	1–1 (5–4 p)	Bootle (8)
22	Crook Town (8)	2–0	Yorkshire Amateur (9)
23	Louth United (9)	2–1	Kennek Ryhope CA (9)
24	Flixton (7)	2–1	Northallerton Town (9)
25	Ashton United (7)	2–1	Clitheroe (8)
26	Goole (9)	1–1	Trafford (7)
replay	Trafford (7)	6–3	Goole (9)
27	Woodley Sports (9)	2–1	Ossett Albion (8)
28	Pickering Town (9)	4–1	Horden Colliery Welfare (9)
29	Denaby United (8)	0–2	Chorley (7)
30	Darwen (9)	0–1	Billingham Synthonia (8)
31	Brodsworth Miners Welfare (8)	1–0	South Shields (8)
32	Mossley (8)	2–1	Atherton Laburnum Rovers (8)
33	Parkgate (9)	1–5	Eccleshill United (8)
34	Thackley (8)	0–1	Consett (8)
35	North Ferriby United (8)	1–0	Witton Albion (7)
36	Penrith (9)	4–0	Shotton Comrades (8)
37	Salford City (8)	2–0	Evenwood Town (9)
38	Radcliffe Borough (7)	2–1	Durham City (8)
39	Selby Town (8)	0–3	Bedlington Terriers (8)
40	Bacup Borough (9)	2–2	Sheffield (8)
replay	Sheffield (8)	4–0	Bacup Borough (9)
41	Curzon Ashton (9)	0–1	Brigg Town (8)
42	Skelmersdale United (8)	5–2	Whitley Bay (7)
43	Easington Colliery (8)	2–2	Newcastle Blue Star (9)
replay	Newcastle Blue Star (9)	4–0	Easington Colliery (8)
44	Seaham Red Star (8)	2–1	West Auckland Town (8)
45	Gretna (7)	5–0	Rossington Main (9)
46	Brackley Town (8)	2–1	Long Buckby (8)
47	Stourbridge (7)	3–1	Bromsgrove Rovers (7)
48	Blackstones (8)	0–0	Willenhall Town (8)
replay	Willenhall Town (8)	4–2	Blackstones (8)
49	Rocester (7)	2–3	Spalding United (7)
50	Stamford (7)	3–1	Corby Town (7)
51	Belper Town (7)	2–2	Stourport Swifts (8)
replay	Stourport Swifts (8)	1–2	Belper Town (7)
52	Boston Town (8)	1–0	Boldmere St Michaels (8)
53	Stratford Town (8)	4–1	Leek CSOB (8)
54	Borrowash Victoria (9)	0–1	Sutton Coldfield Town (7)
55	Matlock Town (7)	1–0	Chasetown (8)
56	Moor Green (7)	3–0	Paget Rangers (7)
57	Barwell (8)	1–1	Staveley Miners Welfare (8)
replay	Staveley Miners Welfare (8)	5–3	Barwell (8)
58	Redditch United (7)	1–0	Kings Norton Town (8)
59	Stafford Rangers (7)	2–0	Glossop North End (8)
60	Lincoln United (7)	1–2	Mickleover Sports (9)
61	Alfreton Town (8)	1–2	Congleton Town (7)
62	Ford Sports Daventry (8)	1–2	Nantwich Town (8)
63	Racing Club Warwick (7)	1–2	Blakenall (7)
64	Shepshed Dynamo (7)	0–3	Raunds Town (7)
65	Bilston Town (7)	2–4	Oadby Town (8)
66	Wednesfield (8)	1–6	Oldbury United (8)
67	Desborough Town (8)	2–3	Northampton Spencer (8)
68	Glapwell (9)	3–1	Stapenhill (8)
69	Bridgnorth Town (8)	1–3	Hinckley United (7)
70	Wellingborough Town (8)	3–0	Kidsgrove Athletic (8)
71	Gresley Rovers (7)	0–1	Eastwood Town (7)
72	Holbeach United (8)	2–0	Pelsall Villa (8)
73	Newcastle Town (8)	1–0	Sandwell Borough (8)
74	VS Rugby (7)	1–2	Solihull Borough (7)
75	Bourne Town (8)	0–2	Stewarts & Lloyds Corby (8)
76	Knypersley Victoria (8)	0–2	Bedworth United (7)
77	Shifnal Town (8)	3–3	Rushall Olympic (8)
replay	Rushall Olympic (8)	0–1	Shifnal Town (8)
78	Arnold Town (8)	1–1	Yaxley (8)
replay	Yaxley (8)	1–2	Arnold Town (8)
79	Halesowen Harriers (8)	4–0	West Midlands Police (8)
80	St Neots Town (8)	2–1	Hornchurch (9)
81	Potters Bar Town (10)	3–3	Flackwell Heath (9)
replay	Flackwell Heath (9)	1–0	Potters Bar Town (10)
82	Great Wakering Rovers (9)	0–0	Staines Town (7)
replay	Staines Town (7)	5–0	Great Wakering Rovers (9)
83	Chalfont St Peter (8)	0–6	Barking (8)
84	Stotfold (8)	0–0	Wembley (8)
replay	Wembley (8)	2–1	Stotfold (8)
85	Grays Athletic (7)	7–1	Basildon United (10)
86	Diss Town (8)	1–6	AFC Sudbury (8)
87	Ely City (9)	2–3	Witham Town (9)
88	Berkhamsted Town (8)	2–2	Bishop's Stortford (7)
replay	Bishop's Stortford (7)	3–3 (4–2 p)	Berkhamsted Town (8)
89	Tiptree United (9)	2–0	London Colney (10)
90	Wealdstone (7)	1–0	Clacton Town (8)
91	Fakenham Town (8)	3–2	Brook House (10)
92	Southend Manor (10)	4–0	Ilford (10)
93	Southall (9)	2–5	Witney Town (7)
94	Felixstowe Port & Town (8)	1–3	Wingate & Finchley (8)
95	Watton United (8)	0–1	Arlesey Town (10)
96	Saffron Walden Town (10)	5–0	Kempston Rovers (8)
97	Romford (7)	1–0	Maldon Town (8)
98	Burnham (7)	0–1	Wisbech Town (7)
99	Harwich & Parkeston (8)	2–3	Harlow Town (7)
100	Warboys Town (8)	3–3	Bury Town (8)
replay	Bury Town (8)	2–2 (3–4 p)	Warboys Town (8)

Tie	Home team (tier)	Score	Away team (tier)
101	Concord Rangers (10)	2–2	East Thurrock United (9)
replay	East Thurrock United (9)	4–2	Concord Rangers (10)
102	Uxbridge (7)	0–1	Wroxham (8)
103	Ruislip Manor (10)	2–0	Leighton Town (8)
104	Gorleston (8)	1–1	Lowestoft Town (8)
replay	Lowestoft Town (8)	1–2	Gorleston (8)
105	Wivenhoe Town (8)	0–1	Bedford Town (7)
106	Banbury United (8)	2–0	Milton Keynes City (10)
107	Burnham Ramblers (10)	1–2	Hoddesdon Town (10)
108	Great Yarmouth Town (8)	5–3	Tilbury (9)
109	Braintree Town (7)	1–1	Leyton Pennant (7)
replay	Leyton Pennant (7)	1–2	Braintree Town (7)
110	Hemel Hempstead Town (8)	4–0	Harpenden Town (10)
111	Soham Town Rangers (8)	7–0	Buckingham Town (8)
112	Aveley (9)	1–0	Stansted (10)
113	Histon (8)	1–0	Hullbridge Sports (10)
114	Wootton Blue Cross (8)	0–2	Cheshunt (8)
115	Waltham Abbey (10)	1–1	Yeading (7)
replay	Yeading (7)	1–3	Waltham Abbey (10)
116	Ware (9)	3–0	Newmarket Town (8)
117	Stowmarket Town (8)	3–0	Welwyn Garden City (10)
118	Baldock Town (7)	6–0	Potton United (8)
119	Bowers United (10)	4–0	Hanwell Town (10)
120	Ford United (8)	5–1	Edgware Town (8)
121	Woodbridge Town (8)	1–5	Chelmsford City (7)
122	Halstead Town (8)	1–3	Royston Town (10)
123	Beaconsfield SYCOB (10)	3–0	Eynesbury Rovers (8)
124	Hertford Town (9)	w/o	Barkingside
Walkover for Hertford Town – Barkingside removed
125	Northwood (8)	8–0	Clapton (9)
126	Marlow (8)	2–2	Barton Rovers (7)
replay	Barton Rovers (7)	1–3	Marlow (8)
127	Kingsbury Town (9)	2–1	Tring Town (9)
128	East Cowes Victoria Athletic (8)	0–1	Sittingbourne (7)
129	Folkestone Invicta (7)	4–2	Croydon Athletic (9)
130	Bracknell Town (9)	2–2	Camberley Town (9)
replay	Camberley Town (9)	1–3	Bracknell Town (9)
131	Cobham (10)	1–1	Farnham Town (10)
replay	Farnham Town (10)	3–2	Cobham (10)
132	Ashford Town (Middx) (10)	1–2	Langney Sports (8)
133	Saltdean United (8)	1–0	Beckenham Town (8)
134	Eastbourne Town (8)	0–0	Three Bridges (8)
replay	Three Bridges (8)	1–1 (3–4 p)	Eastbourne Town (8)
135	Ash United (10)	1–2	Chatham Town (8)
136	Newport (Isle of Wight) (7)	2–0	North Leigh (8)
137	Erith & Belvedere (7)	0–2	Wick (8)
138	Abingdon Town (9)	6–0	Peacehaven & Telscombe (9)
139	Thamesmead Town (8)	2–2	Reading Town (10)
replay	Reading Town (10)	1–0	Thamesmead Town (8)
140	Chipstead (10)	0–5	Tonbridge Angels (7)
141	Hillingdon Borough (10)	1–1	St Leonards (7)
replay	St Leonards (7)	4–1	Hillingdon Borough (10)
142	Leatherhead (7)	0–1	Cowes Sports (8)
143	Merstham (10)	1–5	Corinthian-Casuals (9)
144	Hailsham Town (9)	5–1	Littlehampton Town (8)
145	Molesey (8)	3–1	Ringmer (8)
146	Bedfont (10)	4–0	Tunbridge Wells (8)
147	Raynes Park Vale (10)	1–2	Fisher Athletic (7)
148	Viking Greenford (10)	3–2	Whitstable Town (8)
149	Erith Town (8)	0–0	Dorking (9)
replay	Dorking (9)	1–2	Erith Town (8)
150	Ashford Town (Kent) (7)	2–1	East Preston (8)
151	Shoreham (8)	1–2	Abingdon United (8)
152	Windsor & Eton (8)	0–0	Bromley (7)
replay	Bromley (7)	3–0	Windsor & Eton (8)
153	Oxford City (7)	5–1	Gosport Borough (8)
154	Herne Bay (8)	1–0	Canterbury City (8)
155	Epsom & Ewell (9)	0–3	Worthing (7)
156	Redhill (8)	2–0	Slade Green (8)
157	Deal Town (8)	5–0	Greenwich Borough (8)
158	Fleet Town (7)	1–3	Lewes (9)
159	Hastings Town (7)	6–1	Southwick (9)
160	Bognor Regis Town (7)	2–1	Didcot Town (8)
161	Sandhurst Town (10)	0–0	AFC Newbury (8)
replay	AFC Newbury (8)	5–2	Sandhurst Town (10)
162	Thatcham Town (8)	4–2	Lordswood (8)
163	Chichester City (8)	2–2	Selsey (8)
replay	Selsey (8)	4–2	Chichester City (8)
164	Wokingham Town (8)	1–4	Sheppey United (8)
165	Cray Wanderers (8)	2–2	Portfield (8)
replay	Portfield (8)	2–3	Cray Wanderers (8)
166	Whyteleafe (7)	4–3	Lancing (9)
167	Whitehawk (8)	0–1	Maidenhead United (7)
168	Egham Town (9)	0–2	Croydon (7)
169	Metropolitan Police (8)	2–1	Chertsey Town (7)
170	Horsham (8)	0–1	Hassocks (8)
171	Fareham Town (8)	0–1	Carterton Town (8)
172	Godalming & Guildford (10)	1–2	Horsham YMCA (8)
173	Hythe United (8)	0–0	Burgess Hill Town (8)
replay	Burgess Hill Town (8)	3–0	Hythe United (8)
174	Arundel (9)	1–2	Portsmouth Royal Navy (8)
175	Banstead Athletic (8)	0–2	Thame United (7)
176	Ramsgate (8)	2–1	Dartford (7)
177	Christchurch (8)	1–1	Bridport (8)
replay	Bridport (8)	2–4	Christchurch (8)
178	Frome Town (9)	0–4	Cinderford Town (7)
179	Mangotsfield United (8)	3–0	Hungerford Town (8)
180	Falmouth Town (10)	1–2	Bideford (8)
181	Bridgwater Town (8)	0–5	Lymington & New Milton (8)
182	Minehead Town (8)	1–3	Elmore (8)
183	AFC Totton (8)	1–2	Weston-super-Mare (7)
184	Bashley (7)	6–1	Calne Town (9)
185	Chippenham Town (8)	1–0	Bournemouth (8)
186	Street (9)	0–1	Eastleigh (9)
187	Welton Rovers (9)	4–0	Warminster Town (9)
188	Yate Town (7)	0–3	Taunton Town (8)
189	Tiverton Town (7)	7–1	Pershore Town (8)
190	Bemerton Heath Harlequins (8)	0–1	Brislington (8)
191	Melksham Town (8)	1–3	Evesham United (7)
192	Downton (8)	3–6	Barnstaple Town (8)
193	St Blazey (10)	3–1	Brockenhurst (8)
194	Backwell United (8)	5–1	Andover (8)
195	Westbury United (8)	0–1	Devizes Town (9)
196	Paulton Rovers (8)	1–2	Odd Down (8)
197	Cirencester Town (7)	3–0	BAT Sports (8)

== First qualifying round ==
Matches were played on weekend of 4 September 1999. A total of 202 clubs took part in this stage of the competition, including the 197 winners from the preliminary round and five clubs, who get a bye to this round:

- Stocksbridge Park Steels
- Tooting & Mitcham United
- Torrington
- Tuffley Rovers
- Wimborne Town

Tie	Home team (tier)	Score	Away team (tier)
1	Crook Town (8)	5–0	Armthorpe Welfare (8)
2	Rossendale United (8)	1–1	Ossett Town (7)
replay	Ossett Town (7)	2–0	Rossendale United (8)
3	Consett (8)	0–2	Accrington Stanley (7)
4	Liversedge (8)	3–2	Woodley Sports (9)
5	Bradford Park Avenue (7)	2–1	Skelmersdale United (8)
6	Thornaby-On-Tees (8)	1–5	Tow Law Town (8)
7	Brigg Town (8)	4–0	Harrogate Railway Athletic (8)
8	St Helens Town (8)	1–1	Pickering Town (9)
replay	Pickering Town (9)	3–2	St Helens Town (8)
9	Trafford (7)	3–3	Jarrow Roofing BCA (8)
replay	Jarrow Roofing BCA (8)	1–3	Trafford (7)
10	Hebburn (9)	2–2	Louth United (9)
replay	Louth United (9)	4–2	Hebburn (9)
11	Ramsbottom United (8)	1–2	Fleetwood Freeport (8)
12	Farsley Celtic (7)	1–1	Burscough (7)
replay	Burscough (7)	0–3	Farsley Celtic (7)
13	Mossley (8)	0–2	Gretna (7)
14	Eccleshill United (8)	4–0	Marske United (8)
15	Ashton United (7)	2–0	Flixton (7)
16	Radcliffe Borough (7)	8–1	Warrington Town (9)
17	Chorley (7)	3–0	Seaham Red Star (8)
18	Penrith (9)	0–2	Morpeth Town (8)
19	Sheffield (8)	1–0	Brodsworth Miners Welfare (8)
20	North Ferriby United (8)	3–2	Netherfield Kendal (7)
21	Newcastle Blue Star (9)	1–1	Billingham Synthonia (8)
replay	Billingham Synthonia (8)	3–2	Newcastle Blue Star (9)
22	Dunston Federation Brewery (8)	1–0	Salford City (8)
23	Bedlington Terriers (8)	2–0	Stocksbridge Park Steels (7)
24	Stourbridge (7)	0–2	Belper Town (7)
25	Stafford Rangers (7)	2–2	Matlock Town (7)
replay	Matlock Town (7)	0–4	Stafford Rangers (7)
26	Northampton Spencer (8)	1–1	Boston Town (8)
replay	Boston Town (8)	4–6	Northampton Spencer (8)
27	Hinckley United (7)	1–0	Glapwell (9)
28	Solihull Borough (7)	1–0	Sutton Coldfield Town (7)
29	Wellingborough Town (8)	2–2	Newcastle Town (8)
replay	Newcastle Town (8)	0–4	Wellingborough Town (8)
30	Oldbury United (8)	2–0	Stratford Town (8)
31	Willenhall Town (8)	1–1	Oadby Town (8)
replay	Oadby Town (8)	3–1	Willenhall Town (8)
32	Stamford (7)	3–1	Brackley Town (8)
33	Shifnal Town (8)	2–3	Congleton Town (7)
34	Bedworth United (7)	1–3	Redditch United (7)
35	Moor Green (7)	3–2	Mickleover Sports (9)
36	Staveley Miners Welfare (8)	1–3	Blakenall (7)
37	Eastwood Town (7)	3–0	Holbeach United (8)
38	Halesowen Harriers (8)	1–4	Arnold Town (8)
39	Nantwich Town (8)	3–0	Stewarts & Lloyds Corby (8)
40	Spalding United (7)	1–0	Raunds Town (7)
41	Bishop's Stortford (7)	4–2	Hemel Hempstead Town (8)
42	Banbury United (8)	6–3	Gorleston (8)
43	Cheshunt (8)	1–0	Waltham Abbey (10)
44	Wingate & Finchley (8)	3–2	Braintree Town (7)
45	Great Yarmouth Town (8)	2–3	Warboys Town (8)
46	East Thurrock United (9)	1–2	Baldock Town (7)
47	Romford (7)	4–1	Southend Manor (10)
48	Fakenham Town (8)	1–3	Staines Town (7)
49	Saffron Walden Town (10)	3–2	Hoddesdon Town (10)
50	Wisbech Town (7)	3–1	Wroxham (8)

Tie	Home team (tier)	Score	Away team (tier)
51	Ruislip Manor (10)	0–1	Beaconsfield SYCOB (10)
52	Barking (8)	0–1	Grays Athletic (7)
53	AFC Sudbury (8)	1–0	Flackwell Heath (9)
54	Hertford Town (9)	0–2	Royston Town (10)
55	Arlesey Town (10)	4–1	Bowers United (10)
56	Wealdstone (7)	1–1	Ford United (8)
replay	Ford United (8)	2–3	Wealdstone (7)
57	Marlow (8)	7–0	Histon (8)
58	Kingsbury Town (9)	0–1	Chelmsford City (7)
59	Tiptree United (9)	1–2	Witney Town (7)
60	Ware (9)	1–1	Soham Town Rangers (8)
replay	Soham Town Rangers (8)	2–1	Ware (9)
61	Wembley (8)	3–1	Harlow Town (7)
62	Bedford Town (7)	0–0	Aveley (9)
replay	Aveley (9)	1–2	Bedford Town (7)
63	Northwood (8)	2–0	Stowmarket Town (8)
64	St Neots Town (8)	0–4	Witham Town (8)
65	Ashford Town (Kent) (7)	0–2	Fisher Athletic (7)
66	Farnham Town (10)	3–0	Selsey (8)
67	Hailsham Town (9)	1–3	Sittingbourne (7)
68	Bedfont (10)	5–1	Reading Town (10)
69	Worthing (7)	2–1	Saltdean United (8)
70	Maidenhead United (7)	5–0	Viking Greenford (10)
71	Horsham YMCA (8)	3–0	Cray Wanderers (8)
72	Folkestone Invicta (7)	1–3	Ramsgate (8)
73	St Leonards (7)	0–1	Bognor Regis Town (7)
74	Eastbourne Town (8)	0–4	Langney Sports (8)
75	Lewes (9)	3–3	Erith Town (8)
replay	Erith Town (8)	3–4	Lewes (9)
76	Tonbridge Angels (7)	3–0	Abingdon Town (9)
77	Molesey (8)	0–3	Hastings Town (7)
78	Thame United (7)	3–1	Wick (8)
79	Abingdon United (8)	0–6	Oxford City (7)
80	Deal Town (8)	2–0	Metropolitan Police (8)
81	Thatcham Town (8)	4–6	Cowes Sports (8)
82	Carterton Town (8)	1–4	Herne Bay (8)
83	Corinthian-Casuals (9)	4–0	Sheppey United (8)
84	Hassocks (8)	1–1	Bromley (7)
replay	Bromley (7)	2–1	Hassocks (8)
85	Redhill (8)	1–1	Burgess Hill Town (8)
replay	Burgess Hill Town (8)	3–0	Redhill (8)
86	AFC Newbury (8)	3–1	Portsmouth Royal Navy (8)
87	Chatham Town (8)	2–3	Newport (Isle of Wight) (7)
88	Croydon (7)	1–3	Whyteleafe (7)
89	Bracknell Town (9)	2–4	Tooting & Mitcham United (8)
90	Elmore (8)	0–3	Welton Rovers (9)
91	Lymington & New Milton (8)	3–0	Bideford (8)
92	Devizes Town (9)	0–2	Weston-super-Mare (7)
93	Mangotsfield United (8)	1–1	Odd Down (8)
replay	Odd Down (8)	1–2	Mangotsfield United (8)
94	Backwell United (8)	5–0	Bashley (7)
95	Cinderford Town (7)	0–1	Barnstaple Town (8)
96	Tiverton Town (7)	4–3	Evesham United (7)
97	Christchurch (8)	1–0	Brislington (8)
98	Cirencester Town (7)	2–2	Taunton Town (8)
replay	Taunton Town (8)	4–0	Cirencester Town (7)
99	Torrington (9)	0–2	Wimborne Town (8)
100	Chippenham Town (8)	2–1	St Blazey (10)
101	Tuffley Rovers (8)	2–1	Eastleigh (8)

== Second qualifying round ==
Matches were played on weekend of 18 September 1999. A total of 168 clubs took part in this stage of the competition, including the 101 winners from the first qualifying round and 67 Level 6 clubs, from Premier divisions of the Isthmian League, Northern Premier League and Southern Football League, entering at this stage.

Tie	Home team (tier)	Score	Away team (tier)
1	Guiseley (6)	6–0	Pickering Town (9)
2	Gateshead (6)	3–0	Winsford United (6)
3	Ossett Town (7)	2–1	Spennymoor United (6)
4	Morpeth Town (8)	2–1	Tow Law Town (8)
5	Worksop Town (6)	2–3	Bishop Auckland (6)
6	Lancaster City (6)	Bye	Fleetwood Freeport (8)
Match cancelled - Fleetwood Freeport expelled for fielding ineligible player in Preliminary round
7	Gainsborough Trinity (6)	2–0	Eccleshill United (8)
8	Leigh RMI (6)	5–3	Blyth Spartans (6)
9	Hyde United (6)	1–1	Crook Town (8)
replay	Crook Town (8)	2–1	Hyde United (6)
10	Barrow (6)	2–2	Marine (6)
replay	Marine (6)	3–2	Barrow (6)
11	Ashton United (7)	0–2	Brigg Town (8)
12	Accrington Stanley (7)	0–2	Whitby Town (6)
13	Trafford (7)	2–2	Bamber Bridge (6)
replay	Bamber Bridge (6)	2–1	Trafford (7)
14	Billingham Synthonia (8)	1–2	North Ferriby United (8)
15	Liversedge (8)	1–2	Dunston Federation Brewery (8)
16	Stalybridge Celtic (6)	1–0	Colwyn Bay (6)
17	Emley (6)	2–0	Louth United (9)
18	Sheffield (8)	0–0	Farsley Celtic (7)
replay	Farsley Celtic (7)	2–1	Sheffield (8)
19	Runcorn (6)	2–0	Gretna (7)
20	Bradford Park Avenue (7)	2–2	Droylsden (6)
replay	Droylsden (6)	2–1	Bradford Park Avenue (7)
21	Radcliffe Borough (7)	0–1	Chorley (7)
22	Frickley Athletic (6)	0–1	Bedlington Terriers (8)
23	Nantwich Town (8)	1–0	Hucknall Town (6)
24	Solihull Borough (7)	3–4	Ilkeston Town (6)
25	Moor Green (7)	2–1	Atherstone United (6)
26	Redditch United (7)	0–1	Burton Albion (6)
27	Tamworth (6)	6–1	Spalding United (7)
28	Boston United (6)	3–1	Oldbury United (8)
29	Oadby Town (8)	2–1	Halesowen Town (6)
30	Leek Town (6)	0–2	Blakenall (7)
31	Belper Town (7)	4–2	Arnold Town (8)
32	Grantham Town (6)	6–0	Northampton Spencer (8)
33	Hinckley United (7)	2–0	Wellingborough Town (8)
34	Stamford (7)	1–1	Congleton Town (7)
replay	Congleton Town (7)	2–0	Stamford (7)
35	Stafford Rangers (7)	1–3	Eastwood Town (7)
36	Wisbech Town (7)	1–3	Billericay Town (6)
37	Bishop's Stortford (7)	1–1	Wingate & Finchley (8)
replay	Wingate & Finchley (8)	3–2	Bishop's Stortford (7)
38	Warboys Town (8)	0–2	Witney Town (7)
39	AFC Sudbury (8)	1–2	Dagenham & Redbridge (6)
40	Canvey Island (6)	3–1	Boreham Wood (6)
41	Heybridge Swifts (6)	1–2	Romford (7)
42	Purfleet (6)	0–0	Banbury United (8)
replay	Banbury United (8)	0–1	Purfleet (6)
43	Northwood (8)	3–3	Rothwell Town (6)
replay	Rothwell Town (6)	2–0	Northwood (8)
44	Cambridge City (6)	3–1	Arlesey Town (10)
45	Beaconsfield SYCOB (10)	0–3	King's Lynn (6)

Tie	Home team (tier)	Score	Away team (tier)
46	Saffron Walden Town (10)	1–4	Hitchin Town (6)
47	Aylesbury United (6)	1–3	Chelmsford City (7)
48	Bedford Town (7)	0–2	St Albans City (6)
49	Chesham United (6)	1–3	Baldock Town (7)
50	Royston Town (10)	1–3	Wembley (8)
51	Soham Town Rangers (8)	1–3	Enfield (6)
52	Staines Town (7)	0–3	Wealdstone (7)
53	Marlow (8)	1–4	Harrow Borough (6)
54	Hendon (6)	2–0	Grays Athletic (7)
55	Cheshunt (8)	0–0	Witham Town (8)
replay	Witham Town (8)	0–2	Cheshunt (8)
56	Aldershot Town (6)	6–1	Lewes (9)
57	Thame United (7)	0–1	Whyteleafe (7)
58	Hampton & Richmond Borough (6)	1–1	Bognor Regis Town (7)
replay	Bognor Regis Town (7)	0–0 (5–4 p)	Hampton & Richmond Borough (6)
59	Ramsgate (8)	0–3	Margate (6)
60	Burgess Hill Town (8)	2–2	Bedfont (10)
replay	Bedfont (10)	0–2	Burgess Hill Town (8)
61	Walton & Hersham (6)	0–2	Maidenhead United (7)
62	Tooting & Mitcham United (8)	0–2	Oxford City (7)
63	Farnham Town (10)	2–2	Herne Bay (8)
replay	Herne Bay (8)	X	Farnham Town (10)
The final result was 1-1 after extra time, with Herne Bay winning the penalty shoot-out 4-3, but the entire match was declared void when a rule break was discovered, enforcing a second replay
2nd replay	Farnham Town (10)	1–2	Herne Bay (8)
64	Hastings Town (7)	3–1	AFC Newbury (8)
65	Carshalton Athletic (6)	2–2	Sittingbourne (7)
replay	Sittingbourne (7)	0–1	Carshalton Athletic (6)
66	Tonbridge Angels (7)	0–2	Farnborough Town (6)
67	Horsham YMCA (8)	4–0	Corinthian-Casuals (9)
68	Newport (Isle of Wight) (7)	1–1	Dulwich Hamlet (6)
replay	Dulwich Hamlet (6)	4–1	Newport (Isle of Wight) (7)
69	Slough Town (6)	3–1	Cowes Sports (8)
70	Havant & Waterlooville (6)	2–2	Langney Sports (8)
replay	Langney Sports (8)	2–1	Havant & Waterlooville (6)
71	Bromley (7)	4–1	Crawley Town (6)
72	Gravesend & Northfleet (6)	1–1	Fisher Athletic (7)
replay	Fisher Athletic (7)	2–1	Gravesend & Northfleet (6)
73	Deal Town (8)	2–2	Worthing (7)
replay	Worthing (7)	3–0	Deal Town (8)
74	Christchurch (8)	2–3	Worcester City (6)
75	Clevedon Town (6)	2–1	Tiverton Town (7)
76	Taunton Town (8)	3–0	Dorchester Town (6)
77	Newport County (6)	1–1	Wimborne Town (8)
replay	Wimborne Town (8)	0–3	Newport County (6)
78	Barnstaple Town (8)	2–3	Backwell United (8)
79	Weymouth (6)	0–0	Gloucester City (6)
replay	Gloucester City (6)	2–1	Weymouth (6)
80	Bath City (6)	4–0	Weston-super-Mare (7)
81	Lymington & New Milton (8)	1–1	Tuffley Rovers (8)
replay	Tuffley Rovers (8)	0–5	Lymington & New Milton (8)
82	Welton Rovers (9)	1–3	Salisbury City (6)
83	Chippenham Town (8)	2–0	Mangotsfield United (8)
84	Basingstoke Town (6)	0–0	Merthyr Tydfil (6)
replay	Merthyr Tydfil (6)	2–1	Basingstoke Town (6)

== Third qualifying round ==
Matches were played on weekend of 2 October 1999. A total of 84 clubs took part, all having progressed from the second qualifying round.

Tie	Home team (tier)	Score	Away team (tier)
1	Dunston Federation Brewery (8)	0–2	Runcorn (6)
2	Bamber Bridge (6)	3–0	Morpeth Town (8)
3	Stalybridge Celtic (6)	4–2	Farsley Celtic (7)
4	Bishop Auckland (6)	1–1	Bedlington Terriers (8)
replay	Bedlington Terriers (8)	0–1	Bishop Auckland (6)
5	Lancaster City (6)	2–2	Whitby Town (6)
replay	Whitby Town (6)	2–2 (2–4 p)	Lancaster City (6)
6	Marine (6)	2–0	Chorley (7)
7	North Ferriby United (8)	1–3	Guiseley (6)
8	Droylsden (6)	2–2	Gainsborough Trinity (6)
replay	Gainsborough Trinity (6)	1–2	Droylsden (6)
9	Leigh RMI (6)	1–1	Crook Town (8)
replay	Crook Town (8)	2–1	Leigh RMI (6)
10	Gateshead (6)	4–0	Brigg Town (8)
11	Ossett Town (7)	0–0	Emley (6)
replay	Emley (6)	4–1	Ossett Town (7)
12	Enfield (6)	2–0	Billericay Town (6)
13	Wembley (8)	0–3	Canvey Island (6)
14	Chelmsford City (7)	1–0	Moor Green (7)
15	Belper Town (7)	1–2	Tamworth (6)
16	Wingate & Finchley (8)	0–5	Ilkeston Town (6)
17	Hitchin Town (6)	2–1	Grantham Town (6)
18	Eastwood Town (7)	3–0	Oadby Town (8)
19	Romford (7)	6–0	Congleton Town (7)
20	Cambridge City (6)	1–0	King's Lynn (6)

Tie	Home team (tier)	Score	Away team (tier)
21	Baldock Town (7)	5–1	Cheshunt (8)
22	Wealdstone (7)	1–1	Rothwell Town (6)
replay	Rothwell Town (6)	2–0	Wealdstone (7)
23	Dagenham & Redbridge (6)	0–2	Burton Albion (6)
24	St Albans City (6)	4–2	Nantwich Town (8)
25	Hendon (6)	2–1	Blakenall (7)
26	Boston United (6)	4–0	Purfleet (6)
27	Witney Town (7)	2–1	Hinckley United (7)
28	Chippenham Town (8)	1–1	Worthing (7)
replay	Worthing (7)	3–1	Chippenham Town (8)
29	Dulwich Hamlet (6)	2–1	Hastings Town (7)
30	Bath City (6)	3–1	Farnborough Town (6)
31	Maidenhead United (7)	0–1	Salisbury City (6)
32	Gloucester City (6)	2–3	Merthyr Tydfil (6)
33	Whyteleafe (7)	1–0	Langney Sports (8)
34	Backwell United (8)	2–4	Oxford City (7)
35	Bognor Regis Town (7)	1–0	Bromley (7)
36	Fisher Athletic (7)	1–2	Aldershot Town (6)
37	Herne Bay (8)	0–3	Horsham YMCA (8)
38	Worcester City (6)	3–2	Harrow Borough (6)
39	Slough Town (6)	1–0	Carshalton Athletic (6)
40	Newport County (6)	1–2	Burgess Hill Town (8)
41	Lymington & New Milton (8)	3–1	Clevedon Town (6)
42	Taunton Town (8)	0–3	Margate (6)

== Fourth qualifying round ==
Matches were played on weekend of Saturday 16 October 1999. A total of 64 clubs took part, 42 having progressed from the third qualifying round and 22 clubs from Football Conference, forming Level 5 of English football, entering at this stage. The round featured Burgess Hill Town and Horsham YMCA from the Sussex County Football League, Crook Town from the Northern Football League and Lymington & New Milton from the Wessex Football League still in the competition, being the lowest ranked clubs in this round.

Tie	Home team (tier)	Score	Away team (tier)
1	Nuneaton Borough (5)	2–3	Guiseley (6)
2	Droylsden (6)	0–2	Eastwood Town (7)
3	Telford United (5)	0–0	Gateshead (6)
replay	Gateshead (6)	2–1	Telford United (5)
4	Scarborough (5)	0–1	Tamworth (6)
5	Doncaster Rovers (5)	7–0	Crook Town (8)
6	Southport (5)	1–1	Emley (6)
replay	Emley (6)	0–2	Southport (5)
7	Northwich Victoria (5)	2–2	Hednesford Town (5)
replay	Hednesford Town (5)	1–0	Northwich Victoria (5)
8	Morecambe (5)	1–0	Bishop Auckland (6)
9	Marine (6)	1–1	Runcorn (6)
replay	Runcorn (6)	3–2	Marine (6)
10	Altrincham (5)	0–0	Stalybridge Celtic (6)
replay	Stalybridge Celtic (6)	X	Altrincham (5)
2-1 result was declared null and void due to a rule break, and the FA ordered a second replay
2nd replay	Stalybridge Celtic (6)	3–2	Altrincham (5)
11	Lancaster City (6)	0–0	Bamber Bridge (6)
replay	Bamber Bridge (6)	4–3	Lancaster City (6)
12	Worthing (7)	1–1	Dover Athletic (5)
replay	Dover Athletic (5)	0–1	Worthing (7)
13	Oxford City (7)	2–1	Salisbury City (6)
14	Hendon (6)	1–0	Margate (6)
15	Bognor Regis Town (7)	0–1	Whyteleafe (7)
16	Welling United (5)	2–0	Kidderminster Harriers (5)

Tie	Home team (tier)	Score	Away team (tier)
17	Merthyr Tydfil (6)	2–0	Hitchin Town (6)
18	Dulwich Hamlet (6)	0–0	Hayes (5)
replay	Hayes (5)	3–0	Dulwich Hamlet (6)
19	Kingstonian (5)	0–0	Boston United (6)
replay	Boston United (6)	0–3	Kingstonian (5)
20	Rushden & Diamonds (5)	4–1	Sutton United (5)
21	Ilkeston Town (6)	3–0	Romford (7)
22	Worcester City (6)	2–5	Forest Green Rovers (5)
23	Yeovil Town (5)	2–1	Witney Town (7)
24	Woking (5)	1–1	Burton Albion (6)
replay	Burton Albion (6)	3–1	Woking (5)
25	Enfield (6)	1–1	Baldock Town (7)
replay	Baldock Town (7)	2–2 (2–4 p)	Enfield (6)
26	Lymington & New Milton (8)	1–3	Aldershot Town (6)
27	Rothwell Town (6)	1–1	Kettering Town (5)
replay	Kettering Town (5)	2–1	Rothwell Town (6)
28	Canvey Island (6)	3–3	St Albans City (6)
replay	St Albans City (6)	2–1	Canvey Island (6)
29	Stevenage Borough (5)	1–1	Bath City (6)
replay	Bath City (6)	1–0	Stevenage Borough (5)
30	Horsham YMCA (8)	2–3	Chelmsford City (7)
31	Hereford United (5)	4–1	Burgess Hill Town (8)
32	Slough Town (6)	1–1	Cambridge City (6)
replay	Cambridge City (6)	3–2	Slough Town (6)

== 1999–2000 FA Cup ==
See 1999–2000 FA Cup for details of the rounds from the first round Proper onwards.
