= List of Redditch United F.C. seasons =

English football club

Redditch United is an English football club based in Redditch, Worcestershire. The club participates in the Southern League Premier Division, and play their home games at The Valley.

== Key ==
Top scorer and number of goals scored shown in bold when he was also top scorer for the division.

Key to league record

- Lvl = Level of the league in the current league system
- S = Numbers of seasons
- Pld = Games played
- W = Games won
- D = Games drawn
- L = Games lost
- GF = Goals for
- GA = Goals against
- GD = Goals difference
- Pts = Points
- Position = Position in the final league table
- Overall position = Overall club position in the English league system

Key to cup records

- Res = Final reached round
- Rec = Final club record in the form of wins-draws-losses
- PR = Premilinary round
- QR1 = Qualifying round 1
- QR2 = Qualifying round 2
- QR3 = Qualifying round 3
- QR4 = Qualifying round 4
- R1 = Round 1
- R2 = Round 2
- R3 = Round 3
- R4 = Round 4
- R5 = Round 5
- R6 = Round 6
- QF = Quarter-finals
- SF = Semi-finals
- RU = Runners-up
- W = Winners
- Average home attendance = for league games only

== Seasons ==
| Year | League | Lvl | Pld | W | D | L | GF | GA | GD | Pts | Position | Leading league scorer | | FA Cup | | FA Trophy | | Average home attendance |
| Year | League | Lvl | Pld | W | D | L | GF | GA | GD | Pts | Position | Name | Goals | Res | Rec | Res | Rec | Average home attendance |
|---|---|---|---|---|---|---|---|---|---|---|---|---|---|---|---|---|---|---|
| 1999–2000 | Southern Football League; Western Division | 7 | 42 | 17 | 10 | 15 | 73 | 65 | +8 | 61 | **10th of 22** | | | QR2 | 2-0-1 | R2 | 1-1-1 | |
| 2000–01 | Southern Football League; Western Division | 7 | 42 | 17 | 13 | 12 | 76 | 69 | +7 | 64 | **7th of 22** | | | QR1 | 1-0-1 | R2 | 1-0-1 | |
| 2001–02 | Southern Football League; Western Division | 7 | 42 | 22 | 6 | 14 | 76 | 42 | +34 | 72 | **7th of 22** | | | QR3 | 3-1-1 | R1 | 0-0-1 | |
| 2002–03 | Southern Football League; Western Division | 7 | 40 | 11 | 6 | 23 | 47 | 77 | -30 | 39 | **18th of 22** | | | QR2 | 2-2-1 | R1 | 0-0-1 | |
| 2003–04 | Southern Football League; Western Division | 7 | 40 | 25 | 9 | 6 | 75 | 30 | +45 | 84 | **1st of 22**; Won playoff final Promoted to Conference North | | | QR2 | 2-1-1 | R2 | 1-0-1 | |
| 2004–05 | Conference; North | 6 | 42 | 18 | 8 | 16 | 65 | 59 | +6 | 59 | **9th of 22** | | | QR2 | 0-0-1 | R3 | 2-0-1 | |
| 2005–06 | Conference; North | 6 | 42 | 9 | 12 | 21 | 53 | 78 | -25 | 39 | **20th of 22** | | | QR2 | 0-2-0 | QR3 | 0-1-1 | |
| 2006–07 | Conference; North | 6 | 42 | 11 | 15 | 16 | 61 | 68 | -7 | 48 | **19th of 22** | | | QR2 | 0-0-1 | R3 | 3-0-1 | |
| 2007–08 | Conference; North | 6 | 42 | 15 | 8 | 19 | 41 | 58 | -17 | 53 | **13th of 22** | | | QR2 | 0-0-1 | R1 | 1-1-1 | |
| 2008–09 | Conference; North | 6 | 42 | 12 | 14 | 16 | 49 | 61 | -12 | 50 | **14th of 22** | | | QR2 | 0-0-1 | R2 | 2-1-1 | |
| 2009–10 | Conference; North | 6 | 40 | 10 | 8 | 22 | 49 | 83 | -24 | 38 | **19th of 21** | | | QR4 | 2-2-1 | R1 | 1-0-1 | |
| 2010–11 | Conference; North | 6 | 40 | 2 | 8 | 30 | 30 | 105 | -75 | 9* | **21st of 21**; Relegated | | | QR4 | 2-0-1 | R1 | 0-0-1 | |
| 2011–12 | Southern Football League; Premier Division | 7 | 42 | 14 | 9 | 19 | 45 | 50 | -5 | 51 | **15th of 22** | Jimmy Deabill | 8 | QR1 | 0-0-1 | QR1 | 0-0-1 | 253 |
| 2012–13 | Southern Football League; Premier Division | 7 | 42 | 12 | 7 | 23 | 32 | 65 | -33 | 43 | **19th of 22** | Jemiah Richards | 8 | QR1 | 0-0-1 | QR1 | 0-0-1 | 197 |
| 2013–14 | Southern Football League; Premier Division | 7 | 44 | 20 | 3 | 21 | 68 | 85 | -17 | 63 | **10th of 23** | | | QR1 | 0-1-1 | QR3 | 2-0-1 | 195 |
| 2014–15 | Southern Football League; Premier Division | 7 | 44 | 21 | 12 | 11 | 73 | 44 | +29 | 75 | **6th of 23** | Ashley Sammons | 19 | QR1 | 0-1-1 | QR3 | 2-0-1 | 282 |
| 2015–16 | Southern Football League; Premier Division | 7 | 46 | 24 | 15 | 7 | 82 | 37 | +45 | 84* | **2nd of 24**; Lost in playoff semifinal | Ashlee Sammons; Luke Shearer; George Carline | 11 | QR1 | 0-0-1 | QR1 | 0-0-1 | 326 |
| 2016–17 | Southern Football League; Premier Division | 7 | 46 | 13 | 11 | 22 | 54 | 75 | -21 | 50 | **17th of 24** | Luke Keen | 9 | QR1 | 0-0-1 | QR2 | 1-0-1 | 260 |
| 2017–18 | Southern Football League; Premier Division | 7 | 46 | 15 | 10 | 21 | 73 | 73 | 0 | 55 | **14th of 24** | | | QR2 | 1-0-1 | QR1 | 0-0-1 | |
| 2018–19 | Southern Football League; Premier Division Central | 7 | 42 | 14 | 8 | 20 | 63 | 79 | -16 | 50 | **15th of 24** | | | QR1 | 0-0-1 | QR1 | 0-0-1 | |
| 2019–20 | Southern Football League; Premier Division Central | 7 | 33 | 3 | 3 | 27 | 24 | 89 | -65 | 12 | **24th of 24**; Season abandoned due to COVID-19 pandemic Reprieved from Relegation | | | QR1 | 0-1-1 | QR3 | 2-0-1 | |
| 2020–21 | Southern Football League; Premier Division Central | 7 | 8 | 3 | 3 | 2 | 14 | 11 | +3 | 12 | **6th of 24**; Season abandoned due to COVID-19 pandemic | | | QR1 | 0-0-1 | QR3 | 0-0-1 | |
| 2021–22 | Southern Football League; Premier Division Central | 7 | 40 | 11 | 12 | 17 | 38 | 50 | -12 | 45 | **15th of 24** | | | QR1 | 0-0-1 | QR3 | 0-0-1 | |
