= 2000–01 Southern Football League =

The 2000–01 Southern Football League season was the 98th in the history of the league, an English football competition.

Margate won the Premier Division and earned promotion to the Football Conference. Clevedon Town, Dorchester Town, Fisher Athletic and Halesowen Town were relegated from the Premier Division, whilst Chelmsford City, Tiverton Town, Newport (Isle of Wight) and Hinckley United were promoted from the Eastern and Western Divisions, the former two as champions. Bromsgrove Rovers and Paget Rangers were relegated to the eighth level, whilst Baldock Town and Witney Town of the Eastern Division folded at the end of the season.

== Premier Division ==
The Premier Division consisted of 22 clubs, including 17 clubs from the previous season and five new clubs:

- Two clubs promoted from the Eastern Division:
  - Fisher Athletic
  - Folkestone Invicta
- Two clubs promoted from the Western Division:
  - Moor Green
  - Stafford Rangers
- Plus:
  - Welling United, relegated from the Football Conference

=== League table ===
Southern Football League Premier Division
- Season: 2000–01
- Champions: Margate
- Promoted: Margate
- Relegated: Clevedon Town; Dorchester Town; Fisher Athletic; Halesowen Town
- Matches: 462
- Goals: 1,308 (2.83 per match)

Pos	Team	Pld	W	D	L	GF	GA	GD	Pts	Promotion or relegation
1	Margate	42	28	7	7	75	27	+48	91	Promoted to the Football Conference
2	Burton Albion	42	25	13	4	76	36	+40	88	Transferred to the Northern Premier League Premier Division
3	King's Lynn	42	18	11	13	67	58	+9	65	
4	Welling United	42	17	13	12	59	55	+4	64	
5	Weymouth	42	17	12	13	69	51	+18	63	
6	Havant & Waterlooville	42	18	9	15	66	54	+12	63	
7	Stafford Rangers	42	18	9	15	70	59	+11	63	
8	Worcester City	42	18	8	16	52	53	−1	62	
9	Moor Green	42	18	8	16	50	53	−3	62	
10	Newport County	42	17	10	15	70	61	+9	61	
11	Crawley Town	42	17	10	15	61	54	+7	61	
12	Tamworth	42	17	8	17	58	55	+3	59	
13	Salisbury City	42	17	8	17	64	69	−5	59	
14	Ilkeston Town	42	16	11	15	51	61	−10	59	
15	Bath City	42	15	13	14	67	68	−1	55 (Note: Bath City were deducted three points.)	
16	Cambridge City	42	13	11	18	56	59	−3	50	
17	Folkestone Invicta	42	14	6	22	49	74	−25	48	
18	Merthyr Tydfil	42	11	13	18	49	62	−13	46	
19	Clevedon Town	42	11	7	24	61	74	−13	40	Relegated to the Western Division
20	Fisher Athletic	42	12	6	24	51	85	−34	39 (Note: Fisher Athletic were deducted three points.)	Relegated to the Eastern Division
21	Dorchester Town	42	10	8	24	40	71	−31	38	Relegated to the Eastern Division
22	Halesowen Town	42	8	13	21	47	69	−22	37	Relegated to the Western Division

Source: fchd.com rsssf.com
Rules for classification: 1) points; 2) goal difference; 3) number of goals scored.

== Eastern Division ==
The Eastern Division consisted of 22 clubs, including 17 clubs from the previous season and five new clubs:

- Two clubs relegated from the Premier Division:
  - Grantham Town
  - Rothwell Town
- Plus:
  - Banbury United, promoted from the Hellenic League
  - Histon, promoted from the Eastern Counties League
  - Langney Sports, promoted from the Sussex County League

At the end of the season Langney Sports changed name to Eastbourne Borough.

=== League table ===
Southern Football League Eastern Division
- Season: 2000–01
- Champions: Newport (Isle of Wight)
- Promoted: Chelmsford City; Newport (Isle of Wight)
- Matches: 462
- Goals: 1,438 (3.11 per match)

Pos	Team	Pld	W	D	L	GF	GA	GD	Pts	Promotion or relegation
1	Newport (Isle of Wight)	42	28	10	4	91	30	+61	94	Promoted to the Premier Division
2	Chelmsford City	42	27	9	6	102	45	+57	90	Promoted to the Premier Division
3	Grantham Town	42	25	11	6	100	47	+53	86	
4	Histon	42	23	11	8	84	53	+31	80	
5	Baldock Town	42	23	10	9	81	44	+37	79	Club folded
6	Hastings Town	42	22	10	10	72	50	+22	76	
7	Stamford	42	20	11	11	69	59	+10	71	
8	Tonbridge Angels	42	18	11	13	79	58	+21	65	
9	Langney Sports	42	19	8	15	75	55	+20	65	
10	Rothwell Town	42	20	5	17	86	74	+12	62 (Note: Rothwell Town were deducted three points.)	
11	Corby Town	42	14	10	18	64	92	−28	52	
12	Ashford Town (Kent)	42	15	4	23	53	83	−30	49	
13	Banbury United	42	12	11	19	57	54	+3	47	
14	Witney Town	42	12	11	19	55	71	−16	47	Club folded
15	Bashley	42	10	14	18	57	71	−14	44	
16	Dartford	42	11	11	20	49	67	−18	44	
17	Burnham	42	10	14	18	39	65	−26	43 (Note: Burnham were deducted one point.)	
18	Wisbech Town	42	10	9	23	45	89	−44	39	
19	St. Leonards	42	9	10	23	55	87	−32	37	
20	Erith & Belvedere	42	10	7	25	49	92	−43	37	
21	Sittingbourne	42	8	9	25	41	79	−38	33	
22	Spalding United	42	7	12	23	35	73	−38	33	

Source: fchd.com rsssf.com
Rules for classification: 1) points; 2) goal difference; 3) number of goals scored.

== Western Division ==
The Western Division consisted of 22 clubs, including 18 clubs from the previous season and four new clubs:

- Two clubs relegated from the Premier Division:
  - Atherstone United
  - Gloucester City
- Plus:
  - Mangotsfield United, promoted from the Western Football League
  - Rugby United, transferred from the Eastern Division

At the end of the season Blakenall merged with Bloxwich Town of the Midland Alliance to form Bloxwich United.

=== League table ===
Southern Football League Western Division
- Season: 2000–01
- Champions: Hinckley United
- Promoted: Hinckley United; Tiverton Town
- Relegated: Bromsgrove Rovers; Paget Rangers
- Matches: 462
- Goals: 1,427 (3.09 per match)

Pos	Team	Pld	W	D	L	GF	GA	GD	Pts	Promotion or relegation
1	Hinckley United	42	30	8	4	102	38	+64	98	Promoted to the Premier Division
2	Tiverton Town	42	28	7	7	97	36	+61	91	Promoted to the Premier Division
3	Bilston Town	42	27	9	6	88	48	+40	90	
4	Evesham United	42	27	5	10	86	46	+40	86	
5	Mangotsfield United	42	25	9	8	91	45	+46	84	
6	Solihull Borough	42	22	12	8	73	43	+30	78	
7	Redditch United	42	17	13	12	76	69	+7	64	
8	Weston-super-Mare	42	17	10	15	68	58	+10	61	
9	Atherstone United	42	16	11	15	64	58	+6	59	
10	Rocester	42	18	5	19	57	77	−20	59	
11	Cirencester Town	42	14	15	13	65	74	−9	57	
12	Rugby United	42	13	10	19	51	68	−17	49	Transferred to the Eastern Division
13	Gloucester City	42	12	11	19	76	84	−8	47	
14	Blakenall	42	13	10	19	54	64	−10	46 (Note: Blakenall were deducted three points.)	Merged with Bloxwich Town to form Bloxwich United
15	Shepshed Dynamo	42	12	9	21	54	73	−19	45	
16	Bedworth United	42	12	9	21	38	60	−22	45	
17	Racing Club Warwick	42	13	6	23	46	77	−31	45	
18	Gresley Rovers	42	11	8	23	46	65	−19	41	
19	Cinderford Town	42	11	8	23	56	84	−28	41	
20	Sutton Coldfield Town	42	7	14	21	45	66	−21	35	
21	Paget Rangers	42	9	4	29	38	93	−55	31	Relegated to the Midland Alliance
22	Bromsgrove Rovers	42	7	9	26	47	92	−45	30	Relegated to the Midland Alliance

Source: fchd.com rsssf.com
Rules for classification: 1) points; 2) goal difference; 3) number of goals scored.

== See also ==
- Southern Football League
- 2000–01 Isthmian League
- 2000–01 Northern Premier League
