= 2001–02 Southern Football League =

The 2001–02 Southern Football League season was the 99th in the history of the league, an English football competition.

Kettering Town won the Premier Division and earned promotion to the Football Conference. Newport (Isle of Wight), King's Lynn, Merthyr Tydfil and Salisbury City were relegated from the Premier Division, whilst Hastings Town, Halesowen Town, Grantham Town and Chippenham Town were promoted from the Eastern and Western Divisions, the former two as champions. Wisbech Town were relegated to the eighth level and Bilston Town resigned and dropped to the ninth level, whilst Bloxwich United of the Western Division folded during the season and their record was expunged.

== Premier Division ==
The Premier Division consisted of 22 clubs, including 17 clubs from the previous season and six new clubs:

- Two clubs promoted from the Eastern Division:
  - Chelmsford City
  - Newport (Isle of Wight)
- Two clubs promoted from the Western Division:
  - Hinckley United
  - Tiverton Town
- Two clubs relegated from the Football Conference
  - Hednesford Town
  - Kettering Town

=== League table ===
Southern Football League Premier Division
- Season: 2001–02
- Champions: Kettering Town
- Promoted: Kettering Town
- Relegated: Newport (Isle of Wight); King's Lynn; Merthyr Tydfil; Salisbury City
- Matches: 462
- Goals: 1,341 (2.9 per match)

Pos	Team	Pld	W	D	L	GF	GA	GD	Pts	Promotion or relegation
1	Kettering Town	42	27	6	9	80	41	+39	87	Promoted to the Football Conference
2	Tamworth	42	24	13	5	81	41	+40	85	
3	Havant & Waterlooville	42	22	9	11	74	50	+24	75	
4	Crawley Town	42	22	9	11	67	47	+20	75	
5	Newport County	42	19	9	14	61	48	+13	66	
6	Tiverton Town	42	17	10	15	70	63	+7	61	
7	Moor Green	42	18	7	17	64	62	+2	61	
8	Worcester City	42	16	12	14	65	54	+11	60	
9	Stafford Rangers	42	17	9	16	70	62	+8	60	
10	Ilkeston Town	42	14	16	12	58	61	−3	58	
11	Weymouth	42	15	11	16	59	67	−8	56	
12	Hinckley United	42	14	13	15	64	62	+2	55	
13	Folkestone Invicta	42	14	12	16	51	61	−10	54	
14	Cambridge City	42	12	16	14	60	70	−10	52	
15	Welling United	42	13	12	17	69	66	+3	51	
16	Hednesford Town	42	15	6	21	59	70	−11	51	
17	Bath City	42	13	11	18	56	65	−9	50	
18	Chelmsford City	42	13	11	18	63	75	−12	50	
19	Newport (Isle of Wight)	42	12	12	18	38	61	−23	48	Relegated to the Eastern Division
20	King's Lynn	42	11	12	19	43	57	−14	45	Relegated to the Eastern Division
21	Merthyr Tydfil	42	12	8	22	53	71	−18	44	Relegated to the Western Division
22	Salisbury City	42	6	8	28	36	87	−51	26	Relegated to the Eastern Division

Source: fchd.com rsssf.com
Rules for classification: 1) points; 2) goal difference; 3) number of goals scored.

== Eastern Division ==
The Eastern Division consisted of 22 clubs, including 18 clubs from the previous season and four new clubs:

- Two clubs relegated from the Premier Division:
  - Dorchester Town
  - Fisher Athletic
- Plus:
  - Chatham Town, promoted from the Kent League
  - Rugby United, transferred from the Western Division

Also, Langney Sports changed name to Eastbourne Borough.

At the end of the season Hastings Town changed name to Hastings United.

=== League table ===
Southern Football League Eastern Division
- Season: 2001–02
- Champions: Hastings Town
- Promoted: Hastings Town; Grantham Town
- Relegated: Wisbech Town
- Matches: 462
- Goals: 1,442 (3.12 per match)

Pos	Team	Pld	W	D	L	GF	GA	GD	Pts	Promotion or relegation
1	Hastings Town	42	29	8	5	85	38	+47	95	Promoted to the Premier Division
2	Grantham Town	42	29	6	7	99	43	+56	93	Promoted to the Premier Division
3	Dorchester Town	42	26	10	6	81	36	+45	88	
4	Histon	42	23	8	11	83	49	+34	77	
5	Stamford	42	24	4	14	76	61	+15	76	
6	Fisher Athletic	42	20	10	12	83	56	+27	70	
7	Eastbourne Borough	42	21	6	15	63	46	+17	69	
8	Dartford	42	18	5	19	62	66	−4	59	
9	Erith & Belvedere	42	18	3	21	75	79	−4	57	
10	Bashley	42	15	11	16	71	63	+8	56	
11	Burnham	42	15	10	17	52	54	−2	55	
12	Rugby United	42	16	6	20	55	67	−12	54	Transferred to the Western Division
13	Rothwell Town	42	14	8	20	45	66	−21	50	
14	Ashford Town (Kent)	42	14	6	22	58	78	−20	48	
15	Banbury United	42	13	9	20	53	66	−13	47 (Note: Banbury United were deducted one point.)	
16	Chatham Town	42	13	8	21	56	87	−31	47	
17	Sittingbourne	42	14	4	24	46	69	−23	46	
18	Spalding United	42	13	6	23	72	84	−12	45	
19	Tonbridge Angels	42	13	6	23	65	80	−15	45	
20	St. Leonards	42	14	3	25	52	88	−36	45	
21	Corby Town	42	10	13	19	54	82	−28	43	
22	Wisbech Town	42	11	8	23	56	84	−28	41	Relegated to the Eastern Counties League

Source: fchd.com rsssf.com
Rules for classification: 1) points; 2) goal difference; 3) number of goals scored.

== Western Division ==
The Western Division consisted of 22 clubs, including 17 clubs from the previous season and five new clubs:

- Two clubs relegated from the Premier Division:
  - Clevedon Town
  - Halesowen Town
- Plus:
  - Chippenham Town, promoted from the Western League
  - Stourport Swifts, promoted from the Midland Alliance
  - Swindon Supermarine, promoted from the Hellenic League

=== League table ===
Southern Football League Western Division
- Season: 2001–02
- Champions: Halesowen Town
- Promoted: Chippenham Town; Halesowen Town
- Matches: 420
- Goals: 1,237 (2.95 per match)

Pos	Team	Pld	W	D	L	GF	GA	GD	Pts	Promotion or relegation
1	Halesowen Town	40	27	9	4	85	24	+61	90	Promoted to the Premier Division
2	Chippenham Town	40	26	9	5	81	28	+53	87	Promoted to the Premier Division
3	Weston-super-Mare	40	22	10	8	70	38	+32	76	
4	Solihull Borough	40	20	11	9	75	42	+33	71	
5	Gresley Rovers	40	19	9	12	59	50	+9	66	
6	Sutton Coldfield Town	40	17	11	12	53	46	+7	62	
7	Mangotsfield United	40	17	10	13	74	54	+20	61	
8	Stourport Swifts	40	18	6	16	59	59	0	60	
9	Atherstone United	40	16	8	16	61	59	+2	56	
10	Clevedon Town	40	15	11	14	57	58	−1	56	
11	Bedworth United	40	16	7	17	59	63	−4	55	
12	Evesham United	40	16	7	17	54	70	−16	55	
13	Cirencester Town	40	17	3	20	64	69	−5	54	
14	Gloucester City	40	14	10	16	48	63	−15	52	
15	Cinderford Town	40	14	9	17	54	67	−13	51	
16	Shepshed Dynamo	40	10	10	20	64	84	−20	40	
17	Bilston Town	40	11	7	22	50	72	−22	40	Resigned to the West Midlands (Regional) League
18	Redditch United	40	11	6	23	47	77	−30	39	
19	Swindon Supermarine	40	11	4	25	52	76	−24	37	
20	Racing Club Warwick	40	8	11	21	38	63	−25	35	
21	Rocester	40	5	12	23	33	75	−42	27	
22	Bloxwich United	0	0	0	0	0	0	0	0	Club folded

Source: fchd.com rsssf.com
Rules for classification: 1) points; 2) goal difference; 3) number of goals scored.

== See also ==
- Southern Football League
- 2001–02 Isthmian League
- 2001–02 Northern Premier League
