= SSFL =

SSFL may refer to:

- Santa Susana Field Laboratory, a nuclear and aerospace research facility in Simi Valley, California
- Southern States Football League, a semi-pro American football league based in Florida
- Southern Sydney Freight Line, a railway line in Sydney, Australia
- South of Scotland Football League, an amateur soccer league in Scotland
- Staffordshire Senior Football League, a defunct English football league
- Super Sunday Football League, a semi-pro / amateur soccer league in South Korea
- Super Silly Fun Land, a play area at Universal Studios Hollywood
