= 1992–93 Midland Football Combination =

The 1992–93 Midland Football Combination season was the 56th in the history of Midland Football Combination, a football competition in England.

== Premier Division ==
Midland Football Combination Premier Division
- Season: 1992–93
- Champions: Armitage 90
- Promoted: Armitage 90
- Relegated: Barlestone St. Giles
- Matches: 380
- Goals: 1,221 (3.21 per match)

The Premier Division featured 18 clubs which competed in the division last season, along with two new clubs:

- Meir KA, joined from the Staffordshire Senior Football League
- Studley BKL, promoted from Division One

Also, Hinckley merged with Leicestershire Senior League club Barwell Athletic to create new club Barwell.

=== League table ===
Pos	Team	Pld	W	D	L	GF	GA	GD	Pts	Promotion or relegation
1	Armitage 90	38	26	6	6	91	32	+59	84	Promoted to the Southern Football League
2	Stapenhill	38	25	4	9	105	45	+60	79	
3	Stratford Town	38	21	13	4	70	33	+37	76	
4	Pershore Town	38	22	7	9	75	38	+37	73	
5	Sandwell Borough	38	21	8	9	89	48	+41	71	
6	West Midlands Police	38	20	10	8	77	39	+38	70	
7	Coleshill Town	38	21	6	11	63	44	+19	69	
8	Boldmere St. Michaels	38	17	12	9	74	48	+26	63	
9	Bolehall Swifts	38	15	10	13	66	56	+10	55	
10	Knowle	38	15	10	13	70	71	−1	55	
11	Barwell	38	14	12	12	63	70	−7	54	
12	Northfield Town	38	13	12	13	58	59	−1	51	
13	Meir KA	38	9	12	17	47	60	−13	39	
14	Mile Oak Rovers	38	9	9	20	37	72	−35	36	
15	Studley BKL	38	7	14	17	39	71	−32	35	
16	Chelmsley Town	38	7	13	18	51	75	−24	34	
17	Highgate United	38	8	10	20	48	80	−32	34	
18	Bloxwich Town	38	5	11	22	28	74	−46	26	
19	Barlestone St. Giles	38	5	5	28	40	104	−64	20	Relegated to Division One
20	Alcester Town	38	3	10	25	30	102	−72	19	Club folded

Source: nonleaguematters
Rules for classification: 1) points; 2) goal difference; 3) number of goals scored.

== Division One ==
Midland Football Combination Division One
- Season: 1992–93
- Champions: Wellesbourne
- Promoted: Wellesbourne; Kings Heath
- Relegated: Ledbury Town

The Division One featured 16 clubs which competed in the division last season, along with 5 new clubs:

- Kings Heath, relegated from the Premier Division
- Marston Green, promoted from Division Two
- Hams Hall, promoted from Division Two
- Kenilworth Rangers, promoted from Division Two
- Sherwood Celtic, promoted from Division Two

Also, Kenilworth Rangers changed name to Kenilworth Town.

=== League table ===
Pos	Team	Pld	W	D	L	GF	GA	GD	Pts	Promotion or relegation
1	Wellesbourne	40	27	8	5	89	41	+48	89	Promoted to the Premier Division
2	Kings Heath	40	24	7	9	100	44	+56	79	Promoted to the Premier Division
3	Kenilworth Town	40	23	7	10	87	49	+38	76	
4	West Heath United	40	23	4	13	92	64	+28	73	
5	Handrahan Timbers	40	19	10	11	66	52	+14	67	
6	Kings Norton Ex-Service	40	20	6	14	71	54	+17	66	
7	Southam United	40	17	13	10	66	45	+21	64	
8	Becketts Sporting	40	17	13	10	69	62	+7	64	
9	Sherwood Celtic	40	19	6	15	76	63	+13	63	
10	West Midlands Fire Service	40	18	7	15	71	58	+13	61	
11	Badsey Rangers	39	16	8	15	64	62	+2	56	
12	Hams Hall	40	15	11	14	68	68	0	56	
13	Solihull Borough reserves	40	15	10	15	65	64	+1	55	
14	Marston Green	40	14	8	18	69	75	−6	50	Resigned from the league
15	Wilmcote	40	12	10	18	67	85	−18	46	
16	Polesworth North Warwick	40	12	8	20	68	95	−27	44	
17	Triplex	40	11	10	19	41	57	−16	43	Resigned from the league
18	Dudley Sports	40	11	3	26	55	85	−30	36	
19	Wigston Fields	39	9	8	22	57	80	−23	35	Resigned from the league
20	Upton Town	40	9	8	23	45	84	−39	35	
21	Ledbury Town	40	5	1	34	31	130	−99	16	Relegated to Division Two

Source: nonleaguematters
Rules for classification: 1) points; 2) goal ratio; 3) number of goals scored.

== Division Two ==
Midland Football Combination Division Two
- Season: 1992–93
- Champions: Ansells
- Promoted: Ansells to Premier Division; Shirley Town; Colletts Green; Monica Star to Division One
- Relegated: Kenilworth Town reserves Barlestone St. Giles reserves Wellesbourne reserves Dudley Sports reserves

The Division Two featured 14 clubs which competed in the division last season, along with 7 new clubs:

- Ansells
- Colletts Green
- Meir KA reserves
- Holly Lane
- Burntwood
- Kenilworth Town reserves
- Studley BKL reserves

=== League table ===
Pos	Team	Pld	W	D	L	GF	GA	GD	Pts	Promotion or relegation
1	Ansells	40	32	4	4	137	41	+96	100	Promoted to the Premier Division
2	Shirley Town	40	29	5	6	142	57	+85	92	Promoted to Division One
3	Colletts Green	40	27	5	8	122	52	+70	86	Promoted to Division One
4	Monica Star	40	26	5	9	104	41	+63	83	Promoted to Division One
5	Coleshill Town reserves	40	24	3	13	92	58	+34	75	
6	Fairfield Villa	40	22	8	10	96	60	+36	74	
7	Enville Athletic	40	20	9	11	93	67	+26	69	
8	Meir KA reserves	40	20	9	11	75	57	+18	69	
9	Archdale	40	15	12	13	87	78	+9	57	
10	Holly Lane	40	16	9	15	90	82	+8	57	
11	Swift Personalised Products	40	17	5	18	78	67	+11	56	
12	Pershore Town reserves	40	15	10	15	76	59	+17	55	Resigned from the league
13	Thimblemill REC	40	16	7	17	86	78	+8	55	
14	Burntwood	40	15	6	19	65	75	−10	51	
15	Kenilworth Town reserves	40	13	10	17	65	89	−24	49	Relegated to Division Three
16	Studley BKL reserves	40	12	8	20	67	86	−19	44	
17	Earlswood Town	40	10	5	25	65	110	−45	35	
18	Wigston Fields reserves	40	7	6	27	49	119	−70	27	Resigned from the league
19	Barlestone St. Giles reserves	40	6	4	30	42	168	−126	22	Relegated to Division Three
20	Wellesbourne reserves	40	6	2	32	42	133	−91	20	Relegated to Division Three
21	Dudley Sports reserves	40	3	6	31	45	141	−96	15	Relegated to Division Three

Source: nonleaguematters
Rules for classification: 1) points; 2) goal ratio; 3) number of goals scored.
