= 2002–03 Southern Football League =

The 2002–03 Southern Football League season was the 100th in the history of the league, an English football competition.

Tamworth won the Premier Division and earned promotion to the Football Conference for the first time. Halesowen Town, Hastings United, Ilkeston Town and Folkestone Invicta were relegated from the Premier Division, whilst Dorchester Town, Merthyr Tydfil, Eastbourne Borough and Weston-super-Mare were promoted from the Eastern and Western Divisions, the former two as champions. Spalding United, St Leonards, Rocester and Racing Club Warwick were all relegated to the eighth level.

== Premier Division ==
The Premier Division consisted of 22 clubs, including 17 clubs from the previous season and five new clubs:

- Two clubs promoted from the Eastern Division:
  - Hastings Town, who also changed name to Hastings United
  - Grantham Town
- Two clubs promoted from the Western Division:
  - Chippenham Town
  - Halesowen Town
- Plus:
  - Dover Athletic, relegated from the Football Conference

=== League table ===
Southern Football League Premier Division
- Season: 2002–03
- Champions: Tamworth
- Promoted: Tamworth
- Relegated: Folkestone Invicta; Halesowen Town; Hastings United; Ilkeston Town
- Matches: 462
- Goals: 1,257 (2.72 per match)

Pos	Team	Pld	W	D	L	GF	GA	GD	Pts	Promotion or relegation
1	Tamworth	42	26	10	6	73	32	+41	88	Promoted to the Football Conference
2	Stafford Rangers	42	21	12	9	76	40	+36	75	
3	Dover Athletic	42	19	14	9	42	35	+7	71	
4	Tiverton Town	42	19	12	11	60	43	+17	69	
5	Chippenham Town	42	17	17	8	59	37	+22	68	
6	Worcester City	42	18	13	11	60	39	+21	67	
7	Crawley Town	42	17	13	12	64	51	+13	64	
8	Havant & Waterlooville	42	15	15	12	67	64	+3	60	
9	Chelmsford City	42	15	12	15	65	63	+2	57	
10	Newport County	42	15	11	16	53	52	+1	56	
11	Hednesford Town	42	14	13	15	59	60	−1	55	
12	Moor Green	42	13	14	15	49	58	−9	53	
13	Hinckley United	42	12	16	14	61	64	−3	52	
14	Bath City	42	13	13	16	50	61	−11	52	
15	Welling United	42	13	12	17	55	58	−3	51	
16	Grantham Town	42	14	9	19	59	65	−6	51	
17	Weymouth	42	12	15	15	44	62	−18	51	
18	Cambridge City	42	13	10	19	54	56	−2	49	
19	Halesowen Town	42	12	13	17	52	63	−11	49	Relegated to the Western Division
20	Hastings United	42	10	13	19	44	57	−13	43	Relegated to the Eastern Division
21	Ilkeston Town	42	10	10	22	54	92	−38	40	Relegated to the Western Division
22	Folkestone Invicta	42	7	7	28	57	105	−48	28	Relegated to the Eastern Division

Source: fchd.com rsssf.com
Rules for classification: 1) points; 2) goal difference; 3) number of goals scored.

== Eastern Division ==
The Eastern Division consisted of 22 clubs, including 18 clubs from the previous season and four new clubs:

- Three clubs relegated from the Premier Division:
  - King's Lynn
  - Newport (Isle of Wight)
  - Salisbury City
- Plus:
  - Fleet Town, promoted from the Wessex League

=== League table ===
Southern Football League Eastern Division
- Season: 2002–03
- Champions: Dorchester Town
- Promoted: Dorchester Town; Eastbourne Borough
- Relegated: Spalding United; St. Leonards
- Matches: 462
- Goals: 1,497 (3.24 per match)

Pos	Team	Pld	W	D	L	GF	GA	GD	Pts	Promotion or relegation
1	Dorchester Town	42	28	9	5	114	40	+74	93	Promoted to the Premier Division
2	Eastbourne Borough	42	29	6	7	92	33	+59	93	Promoted to the Premier Division
3	Stamford	42	27	6	9	80	39	+41	87	
4	Salisbury City	42	27	8	7	81	42	+39	86 (Note: Salisbury City were deducted three points.)	
5	Bashley	42	23	12	7	90	44	+46	81	
6	King's Lynn	42	24	7	11	98	62	+36	79	
7	Rothwell Town	42	22	10	10	77	52	+25	76	
8	Banbury United	42	21	11	10	75	50	+25	74	
9	Tonbridge Angels	42	20	11	11	71	55	+16	71	
10	Histon	42	20	7	15	99	62	+37	67	
11	Ashford Town (Kent)	42	18	9	15	63	57	+6	63	
12	Sittingbourne	42	15	8	19	57	69	−12	53	
13	Burnham	42	15	7	20	62	79	−17	52	
14	Fisher Athletic	42	15	5	22	57	80	−23	50	
15	Chatham Town	42	14	5	23	54	84	−30	47	
16	Newport (Isle of Wight)	42	12	6	24	53	87	−34	42	
17	Dartford	42	11	8	23	48	78	−30	41	
18	Erith & Belvedere	42	11	6	25	65	96	−31	39	
19	Corby Town	42	9	11	22	49	84	−35	38	
20	Fleet Town	42	8	8	26	34	80	−46	32	
21	Spalding United	42	4	6	32	40	108	−68	18	Relegated to the United Counties League
22	St. Leonards	42	4	4	34	38	116	−78	16	Relegated to the Sussex County League

Source: fchd.com rsssf.com
Rules for classification: 1) points; 2) goal difference; 3) number of goals scored.

== Western Division ==
The Western Division consisted of 22 clubs, including 18 clubs from the previous season and four new clubs:

- Bromsgrove Rovers, promoted from the Midland Alliance
- Merthyr Tydfil, relegated from the Premier Division
- Rugby United, transferred from the Eastern Division
- Taunton Town, promoted from the Western League

=== League table ===
Southern Football League Western Division
- Season: 2002–03
- Champions: Merthyr Tydfil
- Promoted: Merthyr Tydfil; Weston-super-Mare
- Relegated: Racing Club Warwick; Rocester
- Matches: 462
- Goals: 1,382 (2.99 per match)

Pos	Team	Pld	W	D	L	GF	GA	GD	Pts	Promotion or relegation
1	Merthyr Tydfil	42	28	8	6	78	32	+46	92	Promoted to the Premier Division
2	Weston-super-Mare	42	26	7	9	77	42	+35	85	Promoted to the Premier Division
3	Bromsgrove Rovers	42	23	7	12	73	41	+32	76	
4	Solihull Borough	42	21	13	8	77	48	+29	76	
5	Gloucester City	42	22	9	11	87	58	+29	75	
6	Mangotsfield United	42	21	10	11	106	53	+53	73	
7	Redditch United	42	22	6	14	76	42	+34	72	
8	Rugby United	42	20	9	13	58	43	+15	69	
9	Gresley Rovers	42	19	10	13	63	54	+9	67	
10	Taunton Town	42	20	7	15	76	78	−2	67	
11	Sutton Coldfield Town	42	18	10	14	63	53	+10	64	
12	Evesham United	42	19	6	17	76	72	+4	63	
13	Clevedon Town	42	14	13	15	54	60	−6	55	
14	Cirencester Town	42	15	7	20	62	82	−20	52	
15	Cinderford Town	42	13	12	17	50	67	−17	51	
16	Shepshed Dynamo	42	12	6	24	48	76	−28	42	
17	Stourport Swifts	42	10	11	21	48	66	−18	41	
18	Bedworth United	42	11	7	24	46	74	−28	40	
19	Swindon Supermarine	42	11	5	26	52	85	−33	38	
20	Atherstone United	42	9	10	23	45	78	−33	37	
21	Rocester	42	9	10	23	34	74	−40	37	Relegated to the Midland Alliance
22	Racing Club Warwick	42	3	9	30	33	104	−71	18	Relegated to the Midland Alliance

Source: fchd.com rsssf.com
Rules for classification: 1) points; 2) goal difference; 3) number of goals scored.

== See also ==
- Southern Football League
- 2002–03 Isthmian League
- 2002–03 Northern Premier League
