= 2001–02 Midland Football Combination =

The 2001–02 Midland Football Combination season was the 65th in the history of Midland Football Combination, a football competition in England.

== Premier Division ==
Midland Football Combination Premier Division
- Season: 2001–02
- Champions: Grosvenor Park
- Promoted: Grosvenor Park
- Matches: 462
- Goals: 1,619 (3.5 per match)

The Premier Division featured 18 clubs which competed in the division last season, along with four new clubs:

- Clubs promoted from Division One:
  - Coleshill Town
  - County Sports
  - Shirley Town
- Plus:
  - West Midlands Police, relegated from the Midland Football Alliance

Also:

- Continental Star changed name to Handsworth Continental Star
- Sutton Town changed name to Grosvenor Park

=== League table ===
Pos	Team	Pld	W	D	L	GF	GA	GD	Pts	Promotion or relegation
1	Grosvenor Park	42	31	4	7	111	39	+72	97	Promoted to the Midland Football Alliance
2	Coventry Sphinx	42	27	13	2	91	41	+50	94	
3	Nuneaton Griff	42	26	6	10	98	54	+44	84	
4	Romulus	42	22	7	13	88	59	+29	73	
5	Feckenham	42	20	11	11	78	64	+14	71	
6	Pershore Town	42	20	7	15	86	68	+18	67	
7	West Midlands Police	42	18	7	17	69	75	−6	61	
8	Coventry Marconi	42	16	12	14	74	66	+8	60	
9	Massey Ferguson	42	17	9	16	82	81	+1	60	
10	Coleshill Town	42	18	5	19	76	68	+8	59	
11	Shirley Town	42	18	5	19	97	102	−5	59	Resigned from the league
12	Handsworth Continental Star	42	16	9	17	76	75	+1	57	
13	Highgate United	42	13	12	17	70	74	−4	51	
14	Kings Heath	42	14	9	19	61	71	−10	51	
15	Meir KA	42	13	11	18	64	71	−7	50	
16	Handrahan Timbers	42	12	13	17	49	66	−17	49	
17	Cheslyn Hay	42	14	6	22	51	83	−32	48	
18	County Sports	42	11	13	18	64	108	−44	46	
19	Bolehall Swifts	42	11	11	20	68	84	−16	44	
20	Alvechurch	42	10	10	22	58	79	−21	40	
21	Alveston	42	11	5	26	56	89	−33	38	
22	Southam United	42	8	7	27	52	102	−50	31	

Source: nonleaguematters
Rules for classification: 1) points; 2) goal difference; 3) number of goals scored.
