= 1999–2000 Southern Football League =

The 1999–2000 season was the 97th for the Southern Football League. At the end of the previous season Midland Division was renamed Western Division, and Southern Division was renamed Eastern Division.

Boston United won the Premier Division and earned promotion to the Football Conference. Atherstone United, Gloucester City, Grantham Town and Rothwell Town were relegated from the Premier Division, whilst Folkestone Invicta, Moor Green, Fisher Athletic and Stafford Rangers were promoted from the Eastern and Western divisions, the former two as champions. Fleet Town, Yate Town and Stourbridge were relegated to the eighth level whilst Raunds Town resigned from the league.

== Premier Division ==
The Premier Division consisted of 22 clubs, including 18 clubs from the previous season and four new clubs:

- Two clubs promoted from the Midland Division:
  - Clevedon Town
  - Newport, who also changed name to Newport County.
- Two clubs promoted from the Southern Division:
  - Havant & Waterlooville
  - Margate

=== League table ===
Southern Football League Premier Division
- Season: 1999–2000
- Champions: Boston United
- Promoted: Boston United
- Relegated: Atherstone United; Gloucester City; Grantham Town; Rothwell Town
- Matches: 462
- Goals: 1,357 (2.94 per match)

Pos	Team	Pld	W	D	L	GF	GA	GD	Pts	Promotion or relegation
1	Boston United	42	27	11	4	102	39	+63	92	Promoted to the Football Conference
2	Burton Albion	42	23	9	10	73	43	+30	78	
3	Margate	42	23	8	11	64	43	+21	77	
4	Bath City	42	19	15	8	70	49	+21	72	
5	King's Lynn	42	19	14	9	59	43	+16	71	
6	Tamworth	42	20	10	12	80	51	+29	70	
7	Newport County	42	16	18	8	67	50	+17	66	
8	Clevedon Town	42	18	9	15	52	52	0	63	
9	Ilkeston Town	42	16	12	14	77	69	+8	60	
10	Weymouth	42	14	16	12	60	51	+9	58	
11	Halesowen Town	42	14	14	14	52	54	−2	56	
12	Crawley Town	42	15	8	19	68	82	−14	53	
13	Havant & Waterlooville	42	13	13	16	63	68	−5	52	
14	Cambridge City	42	14	10	18	52	66	−14	52	
15	Worcester City	42	13	11	18	60	66	−6	50	
16	Salisbury City	42	14	8	20	70	84	−14	50	
17	Merthyr Tydfil	42	13	9	20	51	63	−12	48	
18	Dorchester Town	42	10	17	15	56	65	−9	47	
19	Grantham Town	42	14	5	23	63	76	−13	47	Relegated to the Eastern Division
20	Gloucester City	42	8	14	20	40	82	−42	38	Relegated to the Western Division
21	Rothwell Town	42	5	14	23	48	85	−37	29	Relegated to the Eastern Division
22	Atherstone United	42	5	13	24	30	76	−46	28	Relegated to the Western Division

Source: fchd.com rsssf.com
Rules for classification: 1) points; 2) goal difference; 3) number of goals scored.

== Eastern Division ==
The Eastern Division consisted of 22 clubs, including 16 clubs from the previous season Southern Division and six new clubs:

- Three clubs transferred from the Midland Division:
  - Stamford
  - VS Rugby
  - Wisbech Town
- Plus:
  - Burnham, promoted from the Hellenic League
  - Hastings Town, demoted from the Premier Division
  - Spalding United, promoted from the United Counties League

=== League table ===
Southern Football League Eastern Division
- Season: 1999–2000
- Champions: Fisher Athletic
- Promoted: Fisher Athletic; Folkestone Invicta
- Relegated: Fleet Town
- Matches: 462
- Goals: 1,401 (3.03 per match)

Pos	Team	Pld	W	D	L	GF	GA	GD	Pts	Promotion or relegation
1	Fisher Athletic	42	31	5	6	107	42	+65	98	Promoted to the Premier Division
2	Folkestone Invicta	42	30	7	5	101	39	+62	97	Promoted to the Premier Division
3	Newport (Isle of Wight)	42	25	7	10	74	40	+34	82	
4	Chelmsford City	42	24	8	10	74	38	+36	80	
5	Hastings Town	42	22	9	11	76	56	+20	75	
6	Ashford Town (Kent)	42	21	9	12	70	49	+21	72	
7	Tonbridge Angels	42	20	10	12	82	60	+22	70	
8	Dartford	42	17	6	19	52	58	−6	57	
9	Burnham	42	15	9	18	55	64	−9	54	
10	Baldock Town	42	14	10	18	57	69	−12	52	
11	Erith & Belvedere	42	14	9	19	62	68	−6	51	
12	Witney Town	42	13	11	18	48	60	−12	50	
13	VS Rugby	42	13	11	18	58	79	−21	50	Transferred to the Western Division
14	Wisbech Town	42	14	7	21	58	66	−8	49	
15	Spalding United	42	14	6	22	52	71	−19	48	
16	Sittingbourne	42	13	7	22	48	75	−27	46	
17	Stamford	42	9	18	15	50	62	−12	45	
18	St. Leonards	42	11	12	19	67	81	−14	45	
19	Raunds Town	42	11	12	19	44	63	−19	45	Resigned to the United Counties League
20	Bashley	42	12	7	23	56	95	−39	43	
21	Corby Town	42	11	12	19	56	62	−6	42 (Note: Corby Town were deducted three points)	
22	Fleet Town	42	8	8	26	54	104	−50	32	Relegated to the Wessex League

Source: fchd.com rsssf.com
Rules for classification: 1) points; 2) goal difference; 3) number of goals scored.

== Western Division ==
The Western Division consisted of 22 clubs, including 16 clubs from the previous season Midland Division and six new clubs:

- Two clubs transferred from the Southern Division:
  - Cirencester Town
  - Yate Town
- Two clubs relegated from the Premier Division:
  - Bromsgrove Rovers
  - Gresley Rovers
- Plus:
  - Rocester, promoted from the Midland Alliance
  - Tiverton Town, promoted from the Western League

=== League table ===
Southern Football League Western Division
- Season: 1999–2000
- Champions: Stafford Rangers
- Promoted: Moor Green; Stafford Rangers
- Relegated: Stourbridge; Yate Town
- Matches: 462
- Goals: 1,429 (3.09 per match)

Pos	Team	Pld	W	D	L	GF	GA	GD	Pts	Promotion or relegation
1	Stafford Rangers	42	29	6	7	107	47	+60	93	Promoted to the Premier Division
2	Moor Green	42	26	12	4	85	33	+52	90	Promoted to the Premier Division
3	Hinckley United	42	25	12	5	89	47	+42	87	
4	Tiverton Town	42	26	7	9	91	44	+47	85	
5	Solihull Borough	42	20	11	11	85	66	+19	71	
6	Blakenall	42	19	12	11	70	46	+24	69	
7	Cirencester Town	42	20	8	14	72	64	+8	68	
8	Bilston Town	42	16	18	8	66	52	+14	66	
9	Cinderford Town	42	17	11	14	62	64	−2	62	
10	Redditch United	42	17	10	15	73	65	+8	61	
11	Gresley Rovers	42	14	15	13	54	49	+5	57	
12	Weston-super-Mare	42	16	9	17	55	58	−3	57	
13	Sutton Coldfield Town	42	13	17	12	49	52	−3	56	
14	Evesham United	42	13	12	17	69	61	+8	51	
15	Bedworth United	42	13	10	19	52	71	−19	49	
16	Rocester	42	12	12	18	63	78	−15	48	
17	Bromsgrove Rovers	42	13	7	22	59	72	−13	46	
18	Shepshed Dynamo	42	12	7	23	44	66	−22	43	
19	Paget Rangers	42	11	4	27	44	79	−35	37	
20	Racing Club Warwick	42	7	14	21	41	82	−41	35	
21	Stourbridge	42	10	3	29	45	101	−56	33	Relegated to the Midland Alliance
22	Yate Town	42	3	3	36	28	106	−78	12	Relegated to the Hellenic League

Source: fchd.com rsssf.com
Rules for classification: 1) points; 2) goal difference; 3) number of goals scored.

== See also ==
- 1999–2000 Isthmian League
- 1999–2000 Northern Premier League
- Southern Football League
