= 2000–01 Sussex County Football League =

The 2000–01 Sussex County Football League season was the 76th in the history of Sussex County Football League a football competition in England.

== Division One ==
Sussex County Football League Division One
- Season: 2000–01
- Champions: Sidley United
- Relegated: Lancing; Eastbourne Town; East Preston
- Matches: 380
- Goals: 1,243 (3.27 per match)

Division One featured 16 clubs which competed in the division last season, along with four new clubs.

- Clubs promoted from Division Two:
  - Arundel
  - Lancing
  - Sidlesham
- Plus:
  - Chichester City United, formed as merger of Chichester City and Portfield

=== League table ===
Pos	Team	Pld	W	D	L	GF	GA	GD	Pts	Qualification or relegation
1	Sidley United	38	25	8	5	65	31	+34	83	
2	Burgess Hill Town	38	23	9	6	77	46	+31	78	
3	Wick	38	19	10	9	78	51	+27	67	
4	Selsey	38	20	5	13	68	48	+20	65	
5	Horsham YMCA	38	19	6	13	74	54	+20	63	
6	Pagham	38	17	11	10	78	56	+22	62	
7	Chichester City United	38	17	6	15	82	67	+15	57	
8	Three Bridges	38	16	9	13	61	59	+2	57	
9	Sidlesham	38	17	6	15	64	64	0	57	
10	Ringmer	38	17	5	16	55	67	−12	56	
11	Eastbourne United	38	14	10	14	60	53	+7	52	
12	Hassocks	38	15	5	18	57	58	−1	50	
13	Arundel	38	14	8	16	52	68	−16	50	
14	Redhill	38	13	8	17	62	66	−4	47	
15	Littlehampton Town	38	11	10	17	57	61	−4	43	
16	Saltdean United	38	11	8	19	54	73	−19	41	
17	Whitehawk	38	9	11	18	53	73	−20	38	
18	Lancing	38	9	10	19	58	77	−19	37	Relegated to Division Two
19	Eastbourne Town	38	9	8	21	47	66	−19	35	Relegated to Division Two
20	East Preston	38	7	3	28	41	105	−64	24	Relegated to Division Two

Source: nonleaguematters
Rules for classification: 1) points; 2) goal difference; 3) number of goals scored.

== Division Two ==
Sussex County Football League Division Two
- Season: 2000–01
- Champions: Southwick
- Promoted: Southwick; Peacehaven & Telscombe; Hailsham Town
- Relegated: Crowborough Athletic; Lingfield
- Matches: 306
- Goals: 1,084 (3.54 per match)

Division Two featured 14 clubs which competed in the division last season, along with four new clubs.

- Clubs promoted from Division Three:
  - Bosham
  - Crowborough Athletic
  - Wealden
- Plus:
  - Shoreham, relegated from Division One

=== League table ===
Pos	Team	Pld	W	D	L	GF	GA	GD	Pts	Qualification or relegation
1	Southwick	34	23	3	8	76	32	+44	72	Promoted to Division One
2	Peacehaven & Telscombe	34	22	5	7	66	36	+30	71	Promoted to Division One
3	Hailsham Town	34	20	6	8	81	43	+38	66	Promoted to Division One
4	East Grinstead Town	34	19	6	9	58	37	+21	63	
5	Broadbridge Heath	34	18	7	9	80	43	+37	61	
6	Worthing United	34	18	6	10	77	46	+31	60	
7	Oving	34	16	6	12	64	50	+14	54	
8	Westfield	34	13	9	12	49	52	−3	48	
9	Oakwood	34	12	10	12	55	50	+5	46	
10	Bosham	34	13	6	15	48	73	−25	45	
11	Wealden	34	12	8	14	61	59	+2	44	
12	Storrington	34	12	5	17	54	75	−21	41	
13	Shoreham	34	12	4	18	67	84	−17	40	
14	Shinewater Association	34	12	4	18	57	78	−21	40	
15	Mile Oak	34	11	6	17	66	69	−3	39	
16	Crawley Down	34	10	7	17	50	68	−18	37	
17	Crowborough Athletic	34	6	7	21	49	79	−30	25	Relegated to Division Three
18	Lingfield	34	3	3	28	26	110	−84	12	Relegated to Division Three

Source: nonleaguematters
Rules for classification: 1) points; 2) goal difference; 3) number of goals scored.

== Division Three ==
Sussex County Football League Division Three
- Season: 2000–01
- Champions: Rye United
- Promoted: Rye United; Seaford
- Matches: 210
- Goals: 773 (3.68 per match)

Division Three featured 13 clubs which competed in the division last season, along with two new clubs:

- Rye United, joined from the Kent County League
- TSC

=== League table ===
Pos	Team	Pld	W	D	L	GF	GA	GD	Pts	Qualification or relegation
1	Rye United	28	21	3	4	89	38	+51	66	Promoted to Division Two
2	Seaford	28	20	2	6	70	33	+37	62	Promoted to Division Two
3	Haywards Heath Town	28	19	5	4	62	30	+32	62	
4	Steyning Town	28	15	5	8	51	43	+8	50	
5	Franklands Village	28	12	7	9	62	38	+24	43	
6	Ifield	28	12	5	11	58	57	+1	41	
7	TSC	28	10	8	10	58	53	+5	38	
8	St Francis	28	9	9	10	49	53	−4	36	
9	Uckfield Town	28	11	2	15	45	60	−15	35	
10	Ansty Rangers	28	10	4	14	51	63	−12	34	
11	Bexhill Town	28	8	5	15	37	51	−14	29	
12	Forest	28	6	10	12	39	45	−6	28	
13	Hurstpierpoint	28	6	6	16	37	64	−27	24	
14	Newhaven	28	7	3	18	39	69	−30	24	
15	Royal & Sun Alliance	28	4	6	18	26	76	−50	18	Resigned to the West Sussex League

Source: nonleaguematters
Rules for classification: 1) points; 2) goal difference; 3) number of goals scored.
