= 1999–2000 Sussex County Football League =

Football League

The 1999–2000 Sussex County Football League season was the 75th in the history of Sussex County Football League a football competition in England.

== Division One ==
Sussex County Football League Division One
- Season: 1999–2000
- Champions: Langney Sports
- Relegated: Shoreham
- Matches: 380
- Goals: 1,311 (3.45 per match)

Division One featured 18 clubs which competed in the division last season, along with two new clubs, promoted from Division Two:

- Sidley United
- Three Bridges

=== League table ===
Pos	Team	Pld	W	D	L	GF	GA	GD	Pts	Qualification or relegation
1	Langney Sports	38	31	6	1	101	25	+76	99	Promoted to the Southern League Eastern Division
2	Burgess Hill Town	38	26	7	5	78	37	+41	85	
3	Saltdean United	38	24	7	7	97	45	+52	79	
4	East Preston	38	21	5	12	83	52	+31	68	
5	Horsham YMCA	38	18	10	10	78	53	+25	64	
6	Sidley United	38	17	10	11	63	54	+9	61	
7	Hassocks	38	18	5	15	56	45	+11	59	
8	Littlehampton Town	38	17	6	15	53	55	−2	57	
9	Eastbourne Town	38	14	14	10	73	49	+24	56	
10	Selsey	38	16	7	15	80	67	+13	55	
11	Whitehawk	38	16	7	15	58	59	−1	55	
12	Redhill	38	12	12	14	63	58	+5	48	
13	Portfield	38	14	3	21	64	105	−41	45	Merged into Chichester City United
14	Three Bridges	38	11	9	18	53	76	−23	42	
15	Eastbourne United	38	11	8	19	62	80	−18	41	
16	Pagham	38	10	9	19	46	68	−22	39	
17	Chichester City	38	9	7	22	64	77	−13	34	Merged into Chichester City United
18	Wick	38	9	4	25	49	102	−53	31	
19	Ringmer	38	7	5	26	47	95	−48	26	
20	Shoreham	38	7	3	28	43	109	−66	24	Relegated to Division Two

Source: nonleaguematters
Rules for classification: 1) points; 2) goal difference; 3) number of goals scored.

== Division Two ==
Sussex County Football League Division Two
- Season: 1999–2000
- Champions: Sidlesham
- Promoted: Sidlesham; Arundel; Lancing
- Matches: 306
- Goals: 1,050 (3.43 per match)

Division Two featured 14 clubs which competed in the division last season, along with four new clubs.

- Clubs relegated from Division One:
  - Broadbridge Heath
  - Hailsham Town
- Clubs promoted from Division Three:
  - Oving Social Club, who also changed name to Oving
  - Westfield

Also, Crawley Down Village changed name to Crawley Down.

=== League table ===
Pos	Team	Pld	W	D	L	GF	GA	GD	Pts	Qualification or relegation
1	Sidlesham	34	25	6	3	85	29	+56	81	Promoted to Division One
2	Arundel	34	23	5	6	89	37	+52	74	Promoted to Division One
3	Lancing	34	18	9	7	64	43	+21	63	Promoted to Division One
4	Crawley Down	34	18	8	8	54	33	+21	62	
5	Oving	34	15	6	13	59	43	+16	51	
6	East Grinstead Town	34	13	8	13	71	57	+14	47	
7	Hailsham Town	34	12	11	11	59	48	+11	47	
8	Southwick	34	13	8	13	75	76	−1	47	
9	Westfield	34	13	8	13	45	47	−2	47	
10	Storrington	34	12	8	14	52	57	−5	44	
11	Mile Oak	34	12	7	15	63	61	+2	43	
12	Broadbridge Heath	34	11	9	14	62	67	−5	42	
13	Oakwood	34	11	7	16	52	77	−25	40	
14	Peacehaven & Telscombe	34	9	10	15	52	70	−18	37	
15	Worthing United	34	10	7	17	46	80	−34	37	
16	Withdean	34	8	6	20	40	64	−24	30	Resigned from the league
17	Shinewater Association	34	8	6	20	40	77	−37	30	
18	Lingfield	34	8	5	21	42	84	−42	29	

Source: nonleaguematters
Rules for classification: 1) points; 2) goal difference; 3) number of goals scored.

== Division Three ==
Sussex County Football League Division Three
- Season: 1999–2000
- Champions: Bosham
- Promoted: Bosham; Wealden; Crowborough Athletic
- Matches: 240
- Goals: 920 (3.83 per match)

Division Three featured twelve clubs which competed in the division last season, along with four new clubs:

- Bosham, joined from the West Sussex League
- Crowborough Athletic, relegated from Division Two
- Newhaven, relegated from Division Two
- Seaford, joined from the East Sussex League

Also, St Francis Hospital changed name St Francis.

=== League table ===
Pos	Team	Pld	W	D	L	GF	GA	GD	Pts	Qualification or relegation
1	Bosham	30	24	3	3	109	36	+73	75	Promoted to Division Two
2	Wealden	30	22	2	6	78	38	+40	68	Promoted to Division Two
3	Ansty Rangers	30	21	3	6	80	33	+47	66	
4	Crowborough Athletic	30	17	7	6	65	44	+21	58	
5	Haywards Heath Town	30	17	6	7	74	38	+36	57	
6	Uckfield Town	30	16	3	11	55	48	+7	51	
7	Bexhill Town	30	15	4	11	62	60	+2	49	
8	Seaford	30	14	3	13	65	60	+5	45	
9	Forest	30	13	6	11	42	48	−6	45	
10	St Francis	30	10	6	14	42	50	−8	36	
11	Franklands Village	30	9	5	16	39	52	−13	32	
12	Steyning Town	30	9	3	18	55	76	−21	30	
13	Ifield	30	5	6	19	43	69	−26	21	
14	Hurstpierpoint	30	5	5	20	44	81	−37	20	
15	Newhaven	30	5	2	23	34	104	−70	17	
16	Royal & Sun Alliance	30	4	4	22	33	83	−50	16	

Source: nonleaguematters
Rules for classification: 1) points; 2) goal difference; 3) number of goals scored.
