= Bury Academy F.C. =

Bury Academy
- Full name: Bury Academy Football Club
- Founded: 1999
- Dissolved: 1 October 1999
- Ground: Ram Meadow, Bury St Edmunds

Bury Academy Football Club was a football club based in Bury St Edmunds, England.

== History ==
Ahead of the 1999–2000 season, Bury Academy were formed, gaining admission into the Essex Senior League. Prior to their opening league game against Burnham Ramblers, the Daily Gazette described the club as a "young but very skilful, organised side, but they may find senior league football a little too physical". Bury Academy subsequently lost the game 3–1. After losing their opening four games, conceding 15 and scoring twice, manager Joe Taylor resigned. In total, the club played eight games in all competitions, scoring twice and conceding 35 goals, before resigning from the Essex Senior League on 1 October 1999, the day before they were due to play East Ham United.

== Ground ==
During the club's short history, they groundshared with Bury Town at Ram Meadow.
