= 2000–01 Wessex Football League =

Wessex Football League
- Season: 2000–01
- Champions: Andover
- Relegated: Portsmouth Royal Navy

The 2000–01 Wessex Football League was the 15th season of the Wessex Football League. The league champions for the first time in their history were Andover. There was no promotion to the Southern League, but founder members Portsmouth Royal Navy finished bottom and were relegated.

For sponsorship reasons, the league was known as the Jewson Wessex League.

== League table ==
The league consisted of one division of 23 clubs, increased from 21 the previous season, after East Cowes Victoria Athletic were relegated and three new clubs joined:

- Blackfield & Langley, joining from the Hampshire League.
- Fleet Town, relegated from the Southern Football League.
- Swanage Town & Herston, rejoining from the Dorset Combination League after being relegated in 1996.

Pos	Team	Pld	W	D	L	GF	GA	GD	Pts	Relegation
1	Andover (C)	44	37	5	2	153	33	+120	116	
2	Lymington & New Milton	44	34	6	4	106	29	+77	108	
3	Wimborne Town	44	28	9	7	111	52	+59	93	
4	Fleet Town	44	29	3	12	91	56	+35	90	
5	A.F.C. Totton	44	26	9	9	87	47	+40	87	
6	Thatcham Town	44	24	9	11	81	58	+23	81	
7	Eastleigh	44	23	10	11	87	48	+39	79	
8	Gosport Borough	44	23	8	13	74	44	+30	77	
9	Brockenhurst	44	23	7	14	93	72	+21	76	
10	Cowes Sports	44	22	4	18	80	70	+10	70	
11	Bemerton Heath Harlequins	44	15	9	20	63	70	−7	54	
12	A.F.C. Newbury	44	15	8	21	71	78	−7	53	
13	B.A.T. Sports	44	14	10	20	52	75	−23	52	
14	Bournemouth	44	13	12	19	51	65	−14	51	
15	Fareham Town	44	12	10	22	48	74	−26	46	
16	Moneyfields	44	12	9	23	52	76	−24	45	
17	Christchurch	44	11	12	21	55	80	−25	45	
18	Hamble A.S.S.C.	44	10	14	20	39	70	−31	44	
19	Whitchurch United	44	8	13	23	37	72	−35	37	
20	Swanage Town & Herston	44	11	4	29	52	123	−71	37	
21	Blackfield & Langley	44	7	8	29	32	95	−63	29	
22	Downton	44	6	8	30	45	103	−58	26	
23	Portsmouth Royal Navy (R)	44	4	11	29	37	107	−70	23	Relegated to the Hampshire League

(C) Champions; (R) Relegated
