= 1999–2000 Essex Senior Football League =

The 1999–2000 season was the 29th in the history of Essex Senior Football League a football competition in England.

The league featured 13 clubs which competed in the league last season, along with three new clubs:

- Bury Academy, a newly formed club joined the league, before resigning on 1 October 1999 and seeing their record expunged
- Leyton, joined from the Essex Intermediate League
- Woodford Town, joined from the London Intermediate League

Saffron Walden Town were champions, winning their first Essex Senior League title.

== League table ==
Essex Senior Football League
- Season: 1999–2000
- Champions: Saffron Walden Town
- Matches: 210
- Goals: 793 (3.78 per match)

Pos	Team	Pld	W	D	L	GF	GA	GD	Pts
1	Saffron Walden Town	28	19	5	4	85	33	+52	62
2	Southend Manor	28	19	5	4	81	33	+48	62
3	Burnham Ramblers	28	19	5	4	68	32	+36	62
4	Ilford	28	18	4	6	70	34	+36	58
5	Brentwood	28	17	2	9	49	40	+9	53
6	Bowers United	28	14	6	8	51	42	+9	48
7	Sawbridgeworth Town	28	11	10	7	65	48	+17	43
8	Concord Rangers	28	11	9	8	46	41	+5	42
9	Leyton	28	9	5	14	45	55	−10	32
10	Hullbridge Sports	28	8	3	17	44	63	−19	27
11	East Ham United	28	5	8	15	30	65	−35	23
12	Eton Manor	28	6	8	14	41	61	−20	22 (Note: Eton Manor were deducted four points.)
13	Basildon United	28	6	6	16	37	61	−24	22 (Note: Basildon United were deducted two points.)
14	Woodford Town	28	5	3	20	46	99	−53	15 (Note: Woodford Town were deducted three points.)
15	Stansted	28	2	3	23	35	86	−51	9

Source: fchd
Rules for classification: 1) points; 2) goal difference; 3) number of goals scored.
