= Super Sunday Football League =

The Seoul Sunday Football League or SSFL is a football league in South Korea.

== Organisation ==
The league was founded in 2002 by Darren Barber and Daniel Behrendt and is recognized by the Korea Football Association, with the leading finishers qualifying for the preliminary rounds of the Korean FA Cup. Two separate seasons, known as "Spring" and "Fall" take place each year. The league originally featured 4 teams and expanded to 8 in its second season. Further expansion lead to the creation of two separate divisions in 2004 and a name change to the "Seoul Sunday Football League". 16 teams now compete in the SSFL, with 8 teams in each division. Approximately half of the teams are based in Seoul, with teams also based in Suwon, Cheonan, Anyang, Daejeon, Cheongju, Incheon, Goyang, and Osan. The Korea Herald and other Korean media sources report on the matches and standings of the league. The lowest ranked team from Division 1 and champion of Division 2 are relegated and promoted respectively, with the second-bottom and second-top teams contesting a play-off for Division 1 status in the following season. SBFC claimed the Fall 2006 Championship, despite a points deduction and fine for disciplinary reasons.

== Participants ==
The teams and players in the league are generally semi-professional or amateur, with several K-League contracted players featuring in the league. The majority of players are foreign-born, and are generally employed in Korea by the US Army, US Marines, Airforce and Navy and in the private and tertiary-education sectors as English language teachers. Foreign students also play in the league. Most teams feature several Korean nationals, and some teams are predominantly Korean. The most successful team in the history of the league has been SBFC, with Seoul United Seoul Celtic, and Inter Suwon F.C. also consistently challenging for honors.

== Previous Champions ==
Fall 2019: SBFC
Spring 2019: Inter Suwon F.C.
Fall 2018: Inter Suwon F.C.
Spring 2018: SBFC
Fall 2017: Songdo Celtic FC
Spring 2017: Anyang F.C
Fall 2016: Anyang F.C.
Spring 2016: SBFC
Fall 2015: SBFC
Spring 2015: Anyang F.C.
Fall 2014: SBFC
Spring 2014: Inter Suwon F.C.
Fall 2013: SBFC
Spring 2013: SBFC
Fall 2012: SBFC
Spring 2012: Inter Suwon F.C.
Fall 2011: Inter Suwon F.C.
Spring 2011: Inter Suwon F.C.
Fall 2010: Inter Suwon F.C.
Spring 2010: Seoul Celtic F.C.
Fall 2009: Seoul Celtic F.C.
Spring 2009: Seoul Celtic F.C.
Fall 2008: Seoul United F.C.
Spring 2008: Seoul Celtic F.C.
Fall 2007: Daejeon De La Cuba
Spring 2007: Seoul United F.C.
Fall 2006: SBFC
Spring 2006: SBFC
Fall 2005: SBFC
Spring 2005: SBFC
Fall 2004: SBFC
Spring 2004: Seoul United F.C.
Fall 2003: Seoul United F.C.
Spring 2003: Seoul United F.C.
Fall 2002: SBFC
Spring 2002: Soccer N' Love

== List of Champions ==
SBFC 14 (F 2002, F 2004, S 2005, F 2005, S 2006, F 2006, F 2012, S 2013, F 2013, F 2014, F 2015, S 2016, S 2018, F 2019)
Inter Suwon F.C. 7 (F 2010, S 2011, F 2011, S 2012, S 2014, F 2018, S 2019)
Seoul Celtic F.C. 4 (S 2008, S 2009, F 2009. S 2010)
Seoul United F.C. 4 (S 2003, F 2003, S 2004, F 2008)
Anyang F.C. 3 (S 2015, F 2016, S 2017)
Daejeon De La Cuba 1 (F 2007)
Soccer N' Love 1 (S 2002)
Songdo Celtic FC 1 (F 2017)
