= 2000–01 Midland Football Alliance =

Midland Football Alliance
- Season: 2000–01
- Champions: Stourport Swifts
- Promoted: Stourport Swifts
- Relegated: West Midlands Police
- Matches: 462
- Goals: 1,568 (3.39 per match)

The 2000–01 Midland Football Alliance season was the seventh in the history of Midland Football Alliance, a football competition in England.

== Clubs and league table ==
The league featured 20 clubs from the previous season, along with two new clubs:

- Stafford Town, promoted from the West Midlands (Regional) League
- Stourbridge, relegated from the Southern Football League

=== League table ===
| Pos | Team | Pld | W | D | L | GF | GA | GD | Pts | Promotion or relegation |
|---|---|---|---|---|---|---|---|---|---|---|
| 1 | Stourport Swifts | 42 | 28 | 9 | 5 | 109 | 38 | +71 | 93 | Promoted to the Southern Football League |
| 2 | Rushall Olympic | 42 | 28 | 9 | 5 | 98 | 28 | +70 | 93 | |
| 3 | Barwell | 42 | 26 | 11 | 5 | 74 | 35 | +39 | 89 | |
| 4 | Oadby Town | 42 | 26 | 7 | 9 | 89 | 45 | +44 | 82 (Note: Oadby Town deducted 3 points.) | |
| 5 | Stourbridge | 42 | 23 | 10 | 9 | 93 | 52 | +41 | 79 | |
| 6 | Stratford Town | 42 | 20 | 10 | 12 | 96 | 58 | +38 | 70 | |
| 7 | Boldmere St. Michaels | 42 | 19 | 13 | 10 | 73 | 49 | +24 | 70 | |
| 8 | Willenhall Town | 42 | 19 | 8 | 15 | 76 | 62 | +14 | 65 | |
| 9 | Bridgnorth Town | 42 | 17 | 8 | 17 | 79 | 66 | +13 | 59 | |
| 10 | Chasetown | 42 | 15 | 10 | 17 | 55 | 78 | −23 | 55 | |
| 11 | Oldbury United | 42 | 14 | 11 | 17 | 70 | 71 | −1 | 53 | |
| 12 | Cradley Town | 42 | 15 | 4 | 23 | 52 | 80 | −28 | 49 | |
| 13 | Stafford Town | 42 | 12 | 12 | 18 | 68 | 83 | −15 | 48 | |
| 14 | Bloxwich Town | 42 | 14 | 6 | 22 | 54 | 80 | −26 | 48 | Merged into Blakenall |
| 15 | Wednesfield | 42 | 14 | 6 | 22 | 60 | 91 | −31 | 48 | |
| 16 | Shifnal Town | 42 | 12 | 11 | 19 | 56 | 75 | −19 | 47 | |
| 17 | Halesowen Harriers | 42 | 13 | 7 | 22 | 55 | 73 | −18 | 46 | |
| 18 | Stapenhill | 42 | 12 | 8 | 22 | 58 | 91 | −33 | 44 | |
| 19 | Pelsall Villa | 42 | 12 | 6 | 24 | 60 | 90 | −30 | 42 | |
| 20 | Knypersley Victoria | 42 | 10 | 10 | 22 | 64 | 100 | −36 | 37 (Note: Knypersley Victoria deducted 3 points.) | |
| 21 | West Midlands Police | 42 | 9 | 7 | 26 | 67 | 112 | −45 | 34 | Relegated to the Midland Football Combination |
| 22 | Sandwell Borough | 42 | 9 | 7 | 26 | 62 | 111 | −49 | 34 | Club folded |

Source: fchd
Rules for classification: 1) points; 2) goal difference; 3) number of goals scored.
