= 2001–02 Sussex County Football League =

The 2001–02 Sussex County Football League season was the 77th in the history of Sussex County Football League a football competition in England.

== Division One ==
Sussex County Football League Division One
- Season: 2001–02
- Champions: Burgess Hill Town
- Relegated: Eastbourne United; Saltdean United
- Matches: 380
- Goals: 1,303 (3.43 per match)

Division One featured 17 clubs which competed in the division last season, along with three new clubs, promoted from Division Two:

- Hailsham Town
- Peacehaven & Telscombe
- Southwick

=== League table ===
Pos	Team	Pld	W	D	L	GF	GA	GD	Pts	Qualification or relegation
1	Burgess Hill Town	38	28	6	4	100	33	+67	90	
2	Ringmer	38	23	5	10	86	46	+40	74	
3	Chichester City United	38	21	4	13	72	66	+6	67	
4	Selsey	38	19	9	10	69	54	+15	66	
5	Sidley United	38	18	11	9	70	36	+34	65	
6	Hailsham Town	38	20	2	16	62	55	+7	62	
7	Three Bridges	38	18	7	13	82	61	+21	61	
8	Pagham	38	17	8	13	80	67	+13	59	
9	Arundel	38	17	6	15	51	64	−13	57	
10	Horsham YMCA	38	16	6	16	74	58	+16	54	
11	Hassocks	38	15	8	15	57	65	−8	53	
12	Peacehaven & Telscombe	38	15	7	16	58	63	−5	52	
13	Whitehawk	38	14	9	15	69	55	+14	51	
14	Wick	38	15	3	20	56	64	−8	48	
15	Redhill	38	12	5	21	65	83	−18	41	
16	Littlehampton Town	38	11	7	20	64	84	−20	40	
17	Sidlesham	38	11	7	20	56	77	−21	40	
18	Southwick	38	10	9	19	44	76	−32	39	
19	Eastbourne United	38	9	10	19	48	67	−19	37	Relegated to Division Two
20	Saltdean United	38	3	7	28	40	129	−89	16	Relegated to Division Two

Source: nonleaguematters
Rules for classification: 1) points; 2) goal difference; 3) number of goals scored.

== Division Two ==
Sussex County Football League Division Two
- Season: 2001–02
- Champions: Rye & Iden United
- Promoted: Shoreham; East Preston
- Relegated: Storrington; Bosham
- Matches: 306
- Goals: 1,088 (3.56 per match)

Division Two featured 13 clubs which competed in the division last season, along with five new clubs.

- Clubs relegated from Division One:
  - East Preston
  - Eastbourne Town
  - Lancing
- Clubs promoted from Division Three:
  - Rye United, who also changed name to Rye & Iden United
  - Seaford

=== League table ===
Pos	Team	Pld	W	D	L	GF	GA	GD	Pts	Qualification or relegation
1	Rye & Iden United	34	26	3	5	102	33	+69	81	
2	Shoreham	34	22	7	5	74	32	+42	73	Promoted to Division One
3	East Preston	34	20	9	5	89	48	+41	69	Promoted to Division One
4	Eastbourne Town	34	20	5	9	84	39	+45	65	
5	East Grinstead Town	34	18	10	6	70	40	+30	64	
6	Lancing	34	13	10	11	58	48	+10	49	
7	Broadbridge Heath	34	14	7	13	63	54	+9	49	
8	Westfield	34	14	6	14	65	57	+8	48	
9	Worthing United	34	13	9	12	65	63	+2	48	
10	Seaford	34	13	8	13	65	63	+2	47	
11	Crawley Down	34	12	9	13	58	50	+8	45	
12	Oakwood	34	12	8	14	45	55	−10	44	
13	Wealden	34	13	4	17	55	68	−13	43	
14	Mile Oak	34	11	4	19	42	70	−28	37	
15	Oving	34	10	5	19	40	78	−38	35	
16	Shinewater Association	34	9	6	19	51	91	−40	33	
17	Storrington	34	3	6	25	31	74	−43	15	Relegated to Division Three
18	Bosham	34	3	4	27	31	125	−94	13	Relegated to Division Three

Source: nonleaguematters
Rules for classification: 1) points; 2) goal difference; 3) number of goals scored.

== Division Three ==
Sussex County Football League Division Three
- Season: 2001–02
- Champions: Pease Pottage Village
- Promoted: Pease Pottage Village; Steyning Town
- Matches: 240
- Goals: 839 (3.5 per match)

Division Three featured twelve clubs which competed in the division last season, along with four new clubs:

- Crowborough Athletic, relegated from Division Two
- Lingfield, relegated from Division Two
- Pease Pottage Village
- Upper Beeding

=== League table ===
Pos	Team	Pld	W	D	L	GF	GA	GD	Pts	Qualification or relegation
1	Pease Pottage Village	30	22	6	2	88	35	+53	72	Promoted to Division Two
2	Steyning Town	30	22	3	5	79	21	+58	69	Promoted to Division Two
3	Forest	30	17	7	6	44	27	+17	58	
4	Crowborough Athletic	30	17	3	10	68	48	+20	54	
5	Franklands Village	30	16	5	9	51	31	+20	53	
6	Haywards Heath Town	30	14	5	11	46	48	−2	47	
7	Newhaven	30	12	7	11	53	43	+10	43	
8	Upper Beeding	30	11	9	10	59	48	+11	42	
9	TSC	30	9	8	13	61	58	+3	35	Merged into Oakwood
10	Ifield	30	7	12	11	43	57	−14	33	
11	Uckfield Town	30	8	9	13	36	61	−25	33	
12	Hurstpierpoint	30	8	6	16	49	63	−14	30	
13	Bexhill Town	30	8	4	18	32	65	−33	28	
14	Ansty Rangers	30	7	5	18	48	75	−27	26	Merged into St Francis Rangers
15	St Francis	30	7	4	19	43	83	−40	25	Merged into St Francis Rangers
16	Lingfield	30	6	5	19	39	76	−37	23	

Source: nonleaguematters
Rules for classification: 1) points; 2) goal difference; 3) number of goals scored.
