= Leek County School Old Boys F.C. =

Association football club in England

Leek County School Old Boys
- Full name: Leek County School Old Boys Football Club
- Nickname: The Old Boys
- Founded: 1945
- Ground: Pointon Park, Leek
- Chairman: Steve Rutter
- Manager: Dan Hyde
- League: Staffordshire County Senior League Premier Division
- 2024–25: Staffordshire County Senior League Premier Division, 13th of 17
Home colours	Away colours

Leek County School Old Boys Football Club (usually shortened to Leek CSOB) is a football club based in Leek, Staffordshire, England. They are currently members of the Staffordshire County Senior League Premier Division and play at Pointon Park.

== History ==
The club was formed in 1945 and has been in continuous existence since then. They were Leek Minor League champions and Leek & Moorland League champions in 1962, and also won a number of local cups.

In 1984 CSOB were among the founder members of the Staffordshire Senior League. They won the championship of the league (which by this time had changed its name to the Midland League) in 1996, which gained them promotion to the North West Counties Football League Division Two. Two years later they were promoted to Division One, but lasted only three seasons at this level before being relegated back to Division Two, where they remained until they returned to the Staffordshire League in 2014.

== Stadium ==
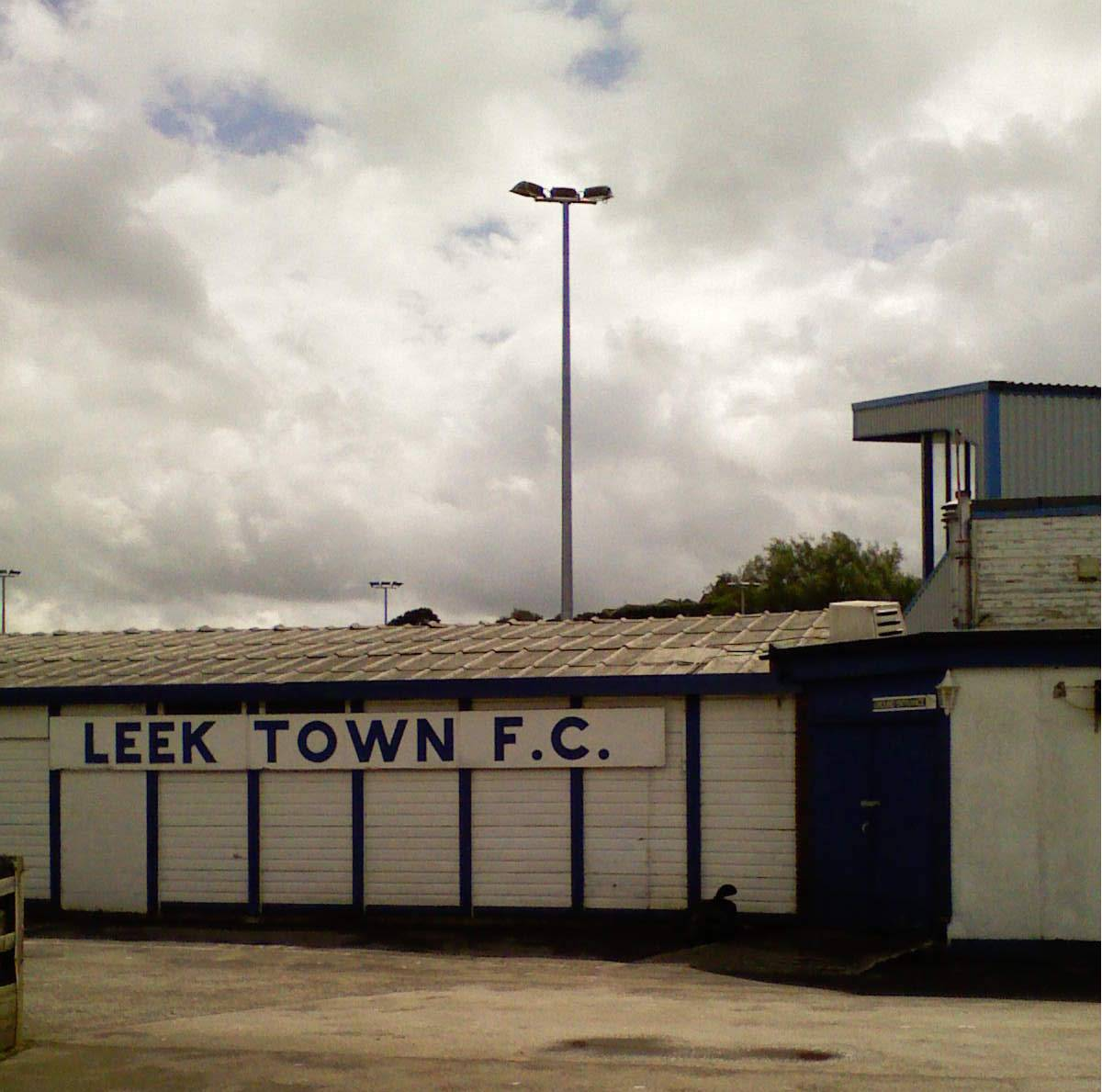
Harrison Park, Leek CSOB's former home ground

The club has never had its own ground and for many years shared Leek Town's ground, Harrison Park. A £300,000 donation received in 2002 gave CSOB the finances to build its own stadium, and as of August 2005 the club was in negotiations with Staffordshire Moorlands District Council to do so. These plans were subsequently rejected by the SMDC. CSOB currently play their games at Pointon Park in Cheddleton.

== Club records ==
- Best league position: Midland League champions, 1995–96
- Best FA Cup performance: 2nd qualifying round, 1998–99
- Best FA Vase performance: 2nd round proper, 2000–01
