= Midland Football League (1994) =

- Founded: 1984
- Folded: 2005
- Country: England

The Midland Football League was a semi-professional football league in the English football league system.

== History ==
The league was established as the Staffordshire Senior League in 1984, taking its clubs from Staffordshire and the areas immediately adjacent. When the league wanted to raise its profile, and attract clubs from a wider area, the decision was made to rename the league as the "Midland League" with effect from the 1994–95 season. It became a feeder to the North West Counties League.

The "new" Midland League consisted of two divisions for the first three seasons, and from 1997 a single grouping. With a merger with the Staffordshire County League in 2005, the new competition became known as the Staffordshire County Senior League, and the Midland League title again fell into disuse.

== Champions ==
- 1984–85: Eastwood Hanley
- 1985–86: Rocester
- 1986–87: Rocester
- 1987–88: Redgate Clayton
- 1988–89: Meir KA
- 1989–90: Eccleshall
- 1990–91: Meir KA
- 1991–92: Redgate Clayton
- 1992–93: Redgate Clayton
- 1993–94: Redgate Clayton
- 1994–95: Ball Haye Green
- 1995–96: Leek CSOB
- 1996–97: Norton United
- 1997–98: Audley
- 1998–99: Norton United
- 1999–2000: Stone Dominoes
- 2000–01: Norton United
- 2001–02: Eccleshall
- 2002–03: Eccleshall
- 2003–04: Abbey Hulton United
- 2004–05: Hanley Town
