= Meir K.A. F.C. =

Coordinates: 52°56′49.67″N 2°06′00.42″W

Meir King's Arms
- Full name: Meir King's Arms Football Club
- Nickname(s): The Kings
- Founded: 1972
- Dissolved: 2010
- Ground: Kings Park; Meir Heath
- 2009–10: Midland Combination; Premier Division, 21st
Home colours	Away colours

Meir King's Arms Football Club was an association football club based in Stoke-on-Trent, England, established in 1972. Originally formed as the Sunday league team of the King's Arms pub in the Meir district, the club was later based in the neighbouring area of Meir Heath. Meir KA reached the 2nd round of the FA Vase twice.

== History ==
The club was formed in 1972 as a Sunday league side based at the King's Arms pub. They competed for three years in the North Staffs and District Sunday League and in 1976 made the decision to switch to Saturday football, initially playing in the Longton League, where they won the league and cup double at the first attempt. In 1978 the club joined the North Staffs Alliance League, shortly after which they moved to their present ground.

In 1984 Meir became founder members of the Staffordshire Senior League, where they were league champions in 1989 and 1991 and also won the Walsall Senior Cup in 1990, beating Rushall Olympic 2–1 after extra time and a replay. In 1992 they stepped up again to the Midland Combination (starting in the Premier Division), where the team played until 2010 when the club closed down.

== Ground ==
The club purchased their ground in 1993 from former owners Mitchells and Butlers and embarked on a major redevelopment scheme. The pitch was re-drained during the 1995 close season and after finally winning planning permission from the local council, Meir completed the second phase of the operation by erecting floodlights in readiness for the 1996 season.

== Club records ==
- Best league performance: 2nd in Midland Combination Premier Division, 1996–97
- Best FA Cup performance: First Qualifying Round, 2008–09
- Best FA Vase performance: 2nd Round, 1994–95 and 1998–99
