= Bloxwich United F.C. =

Bloxwich United
- Full name: Bloxwich United Association Football Club
- Founded: 2001
- Dissolved: 2002
- League: Midland Combination; Premier Division

Bloxwich United F.C. was a football club based in Bloxwich, England. The club was formed by a merger between Blakenall and Bloxwich Town in 2001 and took over the former's place in the Southern League Western Division. However, after 19 games of the 2001–02 season, the controlling Blakenall contingent amongst the joint ownership abruptly pulled out of the merger and resigned the club's place in the Southern League causing their record to be expunged.

The merged club played just one tie in each of the FA Cup and FA Trophy, losing at home on each occasion.

Bloxwich Town reformed the following season and joined the Midland Combination.

== Ground ==
At the time of foundation in 2001, the club proposed to play at Blakenall's Red Lion ground for "at least two years" while renovations at Bloxwich Town's Glastonbury Crescent ground were in operation.

== Club identity ==
The club badge featured a griffin, which was seen as combining the lion device in the Blakenall crest with the kestrel in the Bloxwich emblem.

== Sources ==
=== General ===
- Bloxwich Town at the Football Club History Database
- Bloxwich United at the Football Club History Database
