= Folkestone Invicta F.C. =

Association football club in England

Coordinates: 51°5′11.602″N 1°9′34.031″E

Folkestone Invicta
- Full name: Folkestone Invicta Football Club
- Nicknames: Invicta, The Seasiders, Stripes
- Founded: 1936
- Ground: Cheriton Road, Folkestone
- Capacity: 4,000 (336 seated)
- Chairman: Josh Healey
- Manager: Jay Saunders
- League: National League South
- 2025–26: Isthmian League Premier Division, 1st of 22 (promoted)
Home colours	Away colours

Folkestone Invicta Football Club is a football club based in Folkestone, Kent, England. They are currently members of the National League South and play at Cheriton Road.

== History ==
The club was established in 1936 and joined the East Kent Wednesday League for the 1936–37 season. They continued in the league until World War II. In 1962 the club joined the new Division Two of the Eastern Section of the Kent County Amateur League. They won the division at the first attempt, earning promotion to Division One. The club were Division One champions in 1969–70 and were promoted to the Premier Division. However, they were relegated back to Division One at the end of the following season. After finishing as runners-up in Division One in 1976–77, the club were promoted back to the Premier Division. Two seasons after being promoted, Invicta were champions of the Eastern Section Premier Division. In 1980–81 they were beaten 2–0 by New Romney in the final of the League Cup. The Premier Division was renamed the Senior Division in 1984 and clubs in the division were granted 'Intermediate' status enabling them to enter a higher standard of county cup competition. The club were subsequently runners-up in the Kent Intermediate Shield in both the 1985–86 and 1989–90 seasons, losing 2–1 to Sevenoaks and 6–3 to Sangley Sports respectively.

Folkestone folded in 1990, with Invicta, now the highest-ranked club in the town, taking over their Cheriton Road the following year. In 1990–91 Invicta won the league's Les Leckie Cup (defeating Kennington in the final) and finished third in the Premier Division, after which they were elected to Division Two of the Kent League, which was largely composed of reserve teams. They went on to win the division, as well as the Division Two Cup and the Kent Intermediate Shield in the 1991–92 season, and were promoted to Division One, as well as being awarded senior status. Their first spell in Division One saw them reach the final of the Kent Senior Trophy twice; in 1993–94 they lost 3–1 to Alma Swanley and in 1993–94 were beaten in a penalty shoot-out 5–4 by Deal Town. The club were runners-up in Division One in 1997–98, earning promotion to the Southern Division of the Southern League, also losing another Kent Senior Trophy final 1–0 to Greenwich Borough. After losing 1–0 to Welling United in the final of the Kent Senior Cup in 1998–99, the club were transferred to the Eastern Division for the 1999–2000 season. They went on to finish as runners-up in the division, earning promotion to the Premier Division. However, a second successive Kent Senior Cup final appearance that season ended in a 3–0 defeat by Gravesend & Northfleet.

Invicta spent three seasons in the Premier Division, before finishing bottom of the table in 2002–03, after which they were relegated to the Eastern Division. A fifth-place finish the following season was enough for an immediate promotion due to the creation of the Conference North and South creating several spaces in the divisions above. However, the club were transferred to the Isthmian League, joining its Premier Division. The 2003–04 season also saw another Kent Senior Cup final appearance, in which they were beaten 2–1 by Margate. The following season striker Paul Sykes collapsed and died during a Senior Cup semi-final match against the same opponents, with the club withdrawing from the competition.

Folkstone Invicta squad for the 2022 Kent Senior Cup final

In 2005–06 Invicta reached the first round of the FA Cup for the first time, losing 2–1 at League Two Chester City. The club spent four seasons in the Isthmian League Premier Division before relegation to Division One South at the end of the 2008–09 season. In 2009–10 they were runners-up in Division One South, having missed out on the title due to having ten points deducted for going into administration. However, they qualified for the promotion play-offs, and after beating Leatherhead on penalties in the semi-finals, defeated Godalming Town 2–1 in the final, earning promotion back to the Premier Division. Another Kent Senior Cup final appearance in the same season ended with a 3–1 defeat to Sittingbourne. In the following season the club finished bottom of the Premier Division and were relegated straight back to Division One South.

The next four seasons saw Invicta finish in the top five, qualifying for the promotion play-offs; in 2011–12 they lost 2–1 to Dulwich Hamlet in the semi-finals and in 2012–13 they lost at the same stage to Maidstone United. In 2013–14 they won their semi-final, beating Hastings United 3–2, but lost on penalties to Leatherhead in the final after a 1–1 draw. They reached the final again in 2014–15 after defeating Whyteleafe in the semi-finals, but were beaten 3–0 in the final by Merstham. After four successive play-off failures, the club won Division One South in 2015–16 to return to the Premier Division. They finished fourth in the Premier Division in 2017–18, going on to lose 4–0 in the play-off semi-finals to Hendon. They also lost the Kent Senior Cup final again, beaten 4–2 on penalties by Maidstone United. A sixth Senior Cup final appearance in 2021–22 ended with a 6–2 defeat to Dartford. In 2025–26 the club were Premier Division champions, earning promotion to the National League South.

== Ground ==
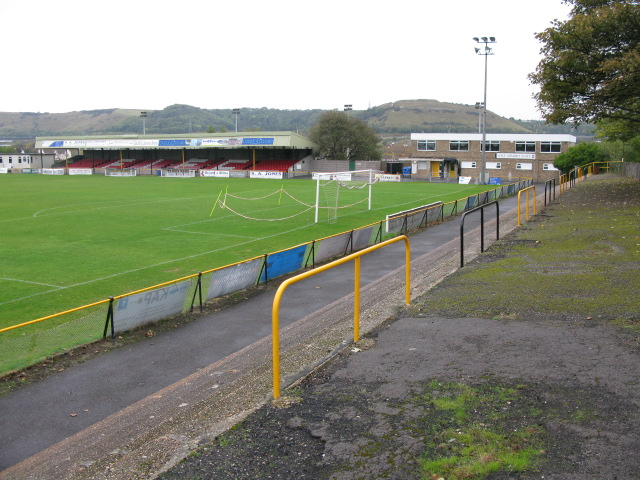
Cheriton Road Ground

When Folkestone folded in 1990, Folkestone Invicta were playing in nearby Hythe. However, they returned to the town in 1991, taking over Folkestone's old Cheriton Road in 1991.

== Current squad ==
As of 18 August 2026

Note: Flags indicate national team as defined under FIFA eligibility rules; some limited exceptions apply. Players may hold more than one non-FIFA nationality.

No.	Pos.	Nation	Player
1	GK	ENG	Ted Collins
2	DF	ENG	Ben Mason
4	DF	ENG	Liam Smith
5	DF	ENG	Jamie Fielding
6	DF	ENG	Kevin Lokko
7	FW	ENG	Devonte West
8	MF	ESP	Alejandro Machado
9	FW	ENG	John Akinde
10	MF	ENG	Donell Thomas
11	FW	ENG	Aaron Cosgrave

No.	Pos.	Nation	Player
12	DF	ENG	Dan Quick
13	GK	ENG	Isaac Ajuchi
16	MF	ENG	Adam Lovatt
18	FW	ENG	Freddie Francis
19	DF	ENG	Dillon Simmons
24	FW	ENG	Josh Strouts
25	MF	ENG	Reggie Young
30	MF	ENG	Alex Woodyard
38	MF	ENG	Harvey Kedwell
39	FW	ENG	Joe Pigott

== Honours ==
- Isthmian League
  - Premier Division champions 2025–26
  - Division One South champions 2015–16
- Kent League
  - Division Two champions 1991–92
  - Division Two Cup winners 1991–92
- Kent County League
  - Eastern Section Premier Division champions 1978–79
  - Eastern Section Division One champions 1969–70
  - Eastern Section Division Two champions 1962–63
  - Les Leckie Cup winners 1990–91
- Kent Intermediate Shield
  - Winners 1991–92

== Records ==
- Best FA Cup performance: First round, 2005–06
- Best FA Trophy performance: Fourth round, 2021–22
- Best FA Vase performance: Fourth round, 1997–98
- Record attendance: 2,906 vs Dover Athletic, Isthmian Premier Division, 5 November 2024
- Biggest victory: 13–0 vs Faversham Town, Kent League Division One, May 1995
- Heaviest defeat: 7–1 vs Crockenhill, Kent League Division One, February 1993; vs Welling United, Kent Senior Cup, February 2009; vs Bognor Regis Town, Isthmian League Premier, March 2017
- Most appearances: Michael Everitt, 753
- Most goals: Ian Draycott, 150 (as of 23 January 2023)

== See also ==
- Folkestone Invicta F.C. players
- Folkestone Invicta F.C. managers
