= Spalding United F.C. =

Association football club in England

Coordinates: 52°47′24.047″N 0°9′9.126″W

Spalding United
- Full name: Spalding United Football Club
- Nickname: The Tulips
- Founded: 1905
- Ground: Sir Halley Stewart Field, Spalding
- Capacity: 2,700 (300 seated)
- Owner: Andrew Killingsworth
- Manager: Jimmy Dean
- League: National League North
- 2025–26: Southern League Premier Division Central, 2nd of 22 (promoted via play-offs)
Home colours	Away colours

Spalding United Football Club is a football club based in Spalding, Lincolnshire, England. The club are currently members of the National League North and play at the Sir Halley Stewart Field.

== History ==
The club was established in 1905 when Fulney Institute and Victoria merged. Their first match was a 3–1 defeat at Stamford. The club joined the Peterborough & District League and were champions in 1930–31. They then stepped up to the Northamptonshire League, which became the United Counties League in 1934. Prior to World War I the club played under the name of Spalding United having merged in 1905/06 with Fulney Institute following a failed merger with then arch rivals Spalding Town, prior to this the club was known as Spalding Victoria.

After World War II they won the Lincolnshire Senior B Cup in 1950–51 and the Senior A Cup in 1952–53. In 1954 they applied to join the Eastern Counties League, but were rejected after a vote. However, the following season they won the UCL for the first time, also winning the League Cup and were accepted into the ECL. In 1960 they switched to the Central Alliance, before joining the Midland League the following season. After finishing bottom in 1967–68 they returned to the UCL. During this period they twice reached the first round of the FA Cup, losing 3–1 at Durham City in 1957–58 and 5–3 at Newport County in 1964–65.

They won the UCL in 1974–75 and after several successive top-four finishes, rejoined the Midland League in 1978. They finished fourth in 1981–82, so were placed in the Premier Division of the Northern Counties East League when it was formed by a merger of the Midland League and the Yorkshire League in 1982. They won the first ever NCEL title with a 1–0 win on the final day of the season. After internal disputes within the NCEL related to the miners' strike, Spalding rejoined the UCL in 1986 and were champions in 1987–88, resulting in promotion to the Midland Division of the Southern League. After finishing bottom in 1990–91 they returned to the UCL.

After a narrow escape from liquidation in the early 1990s the club won the UCL Cup in 1994–95 and the Premier Division in 1998–99. They were promoted back to the Southern League, but again struggled. Despite finishing bottom in 2000–01 the club avoided relegation as other clubs resigned. However, they finished second from bottom in 2002–03 and were relegated again. After a fifth UCL title in 2003–04 they were promoted to Division One of the Northern Premier League. They were transferred to the Midland Division of the Southern League in 2006 but moved back to the NPL a year later to join Division One South. In 2009–10 they finished in the relegation places but avoided demotion due to clubs transferring between leagues. However, they finished bottom of the following season and were relegated back to the UCL.

The club started the 2013–14 season Premier Division season by winning seventeen consecutive games, a league record. The run ended on 14 December 2013 when they lost at home to AFC Rushden & Diamonds. The club went on to win the league, earning promotion to Division One South of the Northern Premier League. In 2016–17 they finished third in Division One South, qualifying for the promotion playoffs. After beating Stocksbridge Park Steels 3–2 in the semi-finals, the club lost 2–1 to Witton Albion in the final. After another third-place finish in Division One Midlands in 2022–23, they beat Sporting Khalsa 2–1 in the play-off semi-finals before losing 2–1 to Halesowen Town in the final. The following season saw the club win the division, earning promotion to the Premier Division Central of the Southern League.

In 2025–26 Spalding were runners-up in the Premier Division Central. They went on to beat Halesowen Town 1–0 in the play-off semi-finals and then defeated Real Bedford in the final to secure promotion to the National League North.

== Ground ==
The club initially played on several different pitches in Clay Lake, Fulney, Love Lane and Black Swan Field, with the latter eventually becoming the club's permanent home ground. In 1954 it was renamed after Halley Stewart, a local MP. After World War II the club spent a season playing at a temporary ground in nearby Low Fulney. The record attendance of 6,972 was set in 1952 for an FA Cup qualifying match against Peterborough United.

== Current squad ==
As of 18 September 2026

Note: Flags indicate national team as defined under FIFA eligibility rules; some limited exceptions apply. Players may hold more than one non-FIFA nationality.

Pos.	Nation	Player
GK	ENG	Peter Crook
GK	ENG	Dan Wilks
DF	ENG	Brad Grant
DF	ENG	Ben Blythe
DF	ENG	Matthew Bondswell
DF	ENG	Ben Hart
DF	ENG	Nathan Fox
DF	ENG	Connor Johnson
DF	ENG	Liam Moore
DF	IRL	Tosin Olopade
DF	ENG	Lewis White
MF	ENG	Alfie Bendle

Pos.	Nation	Player
MF	GAM	Yusifu Ceesay
MF	ENG	Dan Lawlor
MF	ENG	Jordan Nicholson
MF	ENG	Curtis Thompson
FW	POL	Bartosz Cybulski
FW	WAL	Alex Roberts
FW	ENG	Jack Roberts
FW	GBS	Maniche Sano-Sani
FW	ENG	Dion Sembie-Ferris
FW	ENG	Ben Fowkes
FW	ENG	Salem Akanbi
FW	ENG	Dan Barton

== Honours ==
- Northern Premier League
  - Division One Midlands champions 2023–24
- Northern Counties East League
  - Premier Division champions 1983–84
- United Counties League
  - Premier Division champions 1954–55, 1974–75, 1987–88, 1998–99, 2003–04, 2013–14
  - League Cup winners 1954–55, 1994–95
- Peterborough & District League
  - Champions 1930–31
- Lincolnshire Senior A Cup
  - Winners 1952–53
- Lincolnshire Senior B Cup
  - Winners 1950–51

== Records ==
- Best FA Cup performance: First round proper, 1957–58, 1964–65
- Best FA Trophy performance: Third round, 1999–2000
- Best FA Vase performance: Quarter-finals, 1989–90, 1996–97
- Record attendance: 6,973 vs Peterborough United, FA Cup second qualifying round, 11 October 1952

== See also ==
- Spalding United F.C. players
- Spalding United F.C. managers
