= Fisher Athletic F.C. =

Association football club in London, England

Fisher Athletic
- Full name: Fisher Athletic (London) Football Club
- Nicknames: The Fish, The Martyrs
- Founded: 1908
- Dissolved: 2009; 17 years ago
- Ground: Champion Hill, Dulwich
- Capacity: 3,000 (500 seated)
- 2008–09: Conference South, 22nd
Home colours	Away colours

Fisher Athletic F.C. were a semi-professional football club from South East London, which last played in the Conference South, one of the two leagues that form the sixth tier of the English football league system. The Bermondsey-based club ground-shared at Champion Hill Stadium, the home of Dulwich Hamlet. They were wound up by the High Court, after failing to repay their debts, on 13 May 2009. However, it was announced on 29 May that a new club, Fisher F.C., had been formed. The new club was elected to the Kent League for the 2009–10 season.

== History ==
The club was founded in 1908 by Michael Culiton, headmaster at Dockland School, to provide sporting facilities for underprivileged youths of Bermondsey. The club was named after the Catholic martyr Saint John Fisher. They are thus one of the few sports clubs in the world to take their name from a person. The club's closest neighbour was fellow "dockers" Millwall, but as the two teams rarely met in a competitive match there was no strong rivalry. Dulwich Hamlet were often considered the team's closest rivals, despite the former groundshare.

The team competed in various district leagues before moving in 1961 to the Parthenon League where they stayed until the end of the 1965–66 season. At this point the club folded and reformed, this time based in Mitcham, joining the Western Section of the Kent Amateur League for the 1967–68 season.

Fisher were elected to the Spartan League in 1975 and won back-to-back championships in 1980–81 and 1981–82. The latter season coincided with a move to their present home, the purpose-built stadium at Surrey Docks.

Fisher were elected to the Southern League's Southern Division for the 1982–83 season and won the championship at the first attempt, earning promotion to the Southern League Premier Division. 1984–85 saw Fisher reach the first round of the FA Cup, losing 1–0 to Bristol City.

In 1986–87, they won the Southern League title and were promoted to the Football Conference. The following year brought another run to the first round of the FA Cup where the 'Fish' again lost 1–0, their nemesis this time being Bristol Rovers.

Fisher's success came to an end in 1990–91 when they finished bottom of the Conference and dropped back to the Southern League Premier Division. The following season brought a second successive relegation, to the Southern League Southern Division, where they remained until the turn of the millennium, generally finishing in mid-table.

=== Final seasons ===
The 1999–2000 season saw the club win the Southern League Eastern Division. However Fisher's success was short-lived, as after just one season in the Southern League Premier Division they were relegated back into the Eastern Division, where in the following season they finished 6th.

The following two season saw mid-table finishes, with Wayne Burnett taking over as manager in February 2004. Off the field planning permission was granted for a major redevelopment of the Surrey Docks Stadium and new chairman Sami Muduroglu signalled his intentions with a raft of top signings to push Fisher back towards the heady heights of the Conference and this paid instant dividends in 2004-5 with the Southern League Division One East title and the London Senior Cup. The 'Fish' were promoted to the Isthmian League Premier Division for the 2005–06 season.

Wayne Burnett resigned as manager for personal reasons on 21 November 2005. Under Justin Edinburgh Fisher finished third in the Isthmian League Premier Division that season, in addition to winning the Isthmian League Cup and London Senior Cup, and beat Hampton & Richmond Borough 3–0 in the play-off final to win promotion to Conference South.

The 2006–07 season saw the club finish in 10th place in the Conference South under Edinburgh. Wayne Burnett returned to the club in the summer of 2007, and assembled a talented squad. They played superb attacking football in 2007–08, but ended up finishing 4th, and losing to Hampton & Richmond Borough in the play-offs, the side they had beaten to win promotion two years before.

The summer of 2008 saw a player exodus, with six of the previous season's squad moving to Football League clubs. The club's financial difficulties came to a head in the 2008–09 season, as massive debts were found to be piling up. The club stopped paying players in November 2008, then a winding-up order for unpaid income tax issued by the High Court was, on 13 March 2009, adjourned for 49 days until 22 April, and then adjourned for a further 21 days to 13 May 2009.

On 18 February 2009, the club claimed to have made history when turnstile operator Donna Powell became one of the first females to manage a male football club in Britain, having raised £250 for the ailing club, although she was unable to prevent Fisher losing 2–1 to Eastleigh. However, she was not actually a manager in the true sense of the term, just a publicity stunt, as Dave Mehmet was never actually relieved of the position. Droylsden had become the first British men's football club to play matches under a female manager following a disagreement between manager Dave Pace and the Manchester F.A. in 2000. This result came during a run of sixteen consecutive league defeats between 19 November and 9 March, which saw the club eventually relegated on 28 March.

=== Fisher reformed ===
Following a meeting in Bermondsey on the evening of 28 May, a supporters trust was formed to take control of all forthcoming club matters, with 42 founding members. Chairman, Martin Eede and club president, Barry Albin-Dyer continue their roles, with several new faces taking more established roles in the running of the club. This meeting announced AFC Fisher as the working title, before finally deciding on Fisher F.C. The club continued to play their home games at the Champion Hill stadium, and began playing in the Kent League.

== Stadium ==
The club's traditional home was the 5,300-capacity Surrey Docks Stadium in Rotherhithe, in the London Borough of Southwark, but after 2004 home games were played at the ground of Dulwich Hamlet while the Surrey Docks Stadium awaited redevelopment.

The Surrey Docks Stadium was located in the heart of South London's Rotherhithe area, just down the road from the Surrey Quays shopping mall and a short distance from The Den in nearby Bermondsey. The club had plans to redevelop the ground to bring it up to Football League standards by the start of the 2009–10 season. In November 2007 the club announced that it would prefer to move to a new 10,000-seat stadium on the site of the athletics track in Southwark Park, but that the rebuilding of Surrey Docks Stadium remained a possibility.

The pitch in Surrey Docks was protected as Metropolitan Open Land and later became Mayflower Park. The adjacent buildings were damaged in a fire, and were demolished with new housing then being built on a short new road Fisher Close.

Fisher F.C.'s new ground at the St Paul's Sports Ground is about 200 metres away and across Salter Road from the site of Surrey Docks Stadium.

== Honours ==
- London Senior Cup
  - Winners: 1984–85, 1987–88, 1988–89, 2004–05, 2005–06
- Alan Turvey Trophy
  - Winners: 2005–06
