= St. Leonards F.C. =

St. Leonards
- Full name: St. Leonards Football Club
- Nickname: The Saints
- Founded: 1971
- Dissolved: 2003
- Ground: The Firs, Hastings
- 2003–04: Sussex County League Division One, Resigned

St. Leonards F.C. was a semi-professional English football club based in Hastings, East Sussex.

== History ==
The club was founded as a works team in 1971 by employees from the Sussex Turnery And Moulding Company started playing friendlies, under the company name of STAMCO F.C.. They were admitted into Division 5 (East) of the Eastbourne & Hastings Football League for the 1971–72 season and by 1976 had progressed to Intermediate status in 1976 and had reached the Premier Division the following year.

For the 1982–83 season STAMCO joined the Southern Counties Combination, winning Division Two in their first season. Within the next three seasons the club had won two Premier Division Championships and were promoted into Division Three of the Sussex County League in 1988. The gained senior status after earning promotion into Division Two by finishing Runners-up in the League and Cup. In the 1992–93 season they won promotion into Division One as Runners-up after missing out on the Championship on the final day of the season.

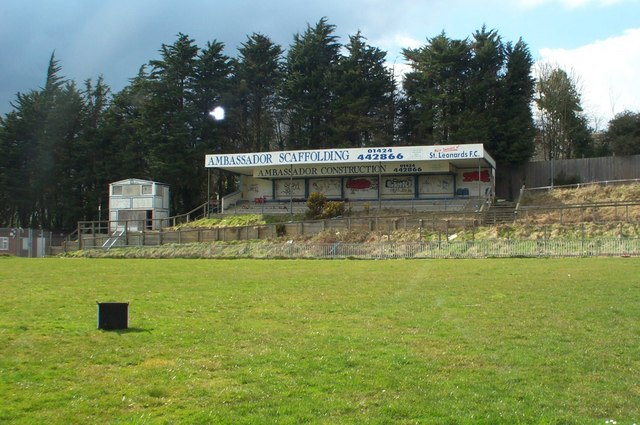
View of the Main Stand at the Firs, after the ground became disused

Their first season in Division One saw them finish in 9th place and reach the semi-finals of the Sussex Senior Cup, the next two seasons they finished Runners-up to Peacehaven & Telscombe and they won promotion to the Southern League for the 1996–97 season. However, before they were accepted into the Southern League, the league required that the club, who were by now playing at The Firs, changed their name to reflect the club's geographical location. The club's two main sponsors, STAMCO and Croft Glass, were fused into the new name, the result was St. Leonards Stamcroft. The 1996–97 season saw the club finish runners up to Forest Green and won the Sussex Senior Cup, beating Saltdean United 2–1 in the final.

However the club were relegated in their only season in the Premier Division and struggled both on the pitch and financially the following seasons. During the 2002–03 they resigned from the Southern League and returned to the Sussex County League for the 2003–04, however mounting debts had caught up with them and they folded during the season.

== Colours and crest ==
The club used various crests during its history, the first crest used consisted of an oak tree and a football above the words 'Stamco Football Club', the crest was in the club's colours of light blue and white. In 1998 the club started using the town crest of St. Leonards-on-Sea, which had been created by James Burton in the 1820s.

== Ground ==
The club moved to The Firs, from Pannel Lane, in 1993. The ground had previously been used by Hastings Town until they moved into the Pilot Field next door after the demise of the old Hastings United. During the summer of 1993, the ground was redeveloped ensuring the club could play in Division One of the Sussex County League. Further improvements were made to the ground in 1996, to allow the club to enter the Southern League, after initially being rejected. After the club folded the ground was briefly used by St. Leonards Social FC, who play in the East Sussex League, however the ground has since become disused and a 5-a-side astroturf pitch was constructed on the pitch, ensuring that no local club can again use the Firs.

== Former players ==
- For all St. Leonards players with a Wikipedia article see Category:St. Leonards F.C. players.

== Honours and achievements ==
- Sussex County League
  - Sussex County League Division 1 Runners-Up (2): 1994–95, 1995–96
  - Sussex County League Division 2 Runners-Up (1): 1992–93
  - Sussex County League Division 3 Runners-Up (1): 1988–89
- Sussex County Cups
  - Sussex Senior Cup Winners (1): 1996–97
- Southern Counties Combination
  - Southern Counties Combination Division 2 Winners (1): 1982–83
