= List of Nuneaton Town F.C. seasons =

Nuneaton Borough Football Club is an English association football club based in Nuneaton, Warwickshire. The club participates in the Conference National, the fifth tier of English football.

In 1889 Nuneaton St. Nicholas were the first team to play senior football within Nuneaton. Five years later they changed their name to Nuneaton Town, and played until 1937 when the club was disbanded. However, two days later Nuneaton Borough F.C. were founded but in 1991, the club ran into financial difficulties and were renamed Nuneaton Borough AFC. In 2008 the club was liquidated, and were reformed as Nuneaton Town – suffering a two division demotion. The club is still known as 'The Boro' by locals and by those who support the team. The club play their home fixtures at Liberty Way in their home kit of blue & white vertical stripes.

== Key ==
- P = Games played
- W = Games won
- D = Games drawn
- L = Games lost
- F = Goals for
- A = Goals against
- GD = Goal difference
- Pts = Points

Lost in play-offs	Promoted	Relegated or demoted

== Seasons ==
Year	League	Level	P	W	D	L	F	A	GD	Pts	Position	Leading league scorer	Goals	FA Cup	FA Trophy	Average attendance
as Nuneaton Borough F.C.
1979-80	Alliance Premier League	5	38	13	13	12	58	44	+14	39	10th of 20	No Data	No Data	R1	QF	No Data
1980-81	Alliance Premier League	5	38	10	9	19	49	65	-16	29	18th of 20; Relegated	No Data	No Data	QR4	R1	No Data
1981-82	SFL Midland Division	6	42	27	11	4	88	32	+56	65	1st of 22; Promoted as champions	No Data	No Data	R1	R1	No Data
1982-83	Alliance Premier League	5	42	15	13	14	57	60	-3	58	11th of 22	No Data	No Data	QR2	R2	No Data
1983-84	Alliance Premier League	5	42	24	11	7	70	40	+30	69	2nd of 22	No Data	No Data	QR1	R3	No Data
1984-85	Alliance Premier League	5	42	19	14	9	85	53	+32	58	2nd of 22	No Data	No Data	R1	R1	No Data
1985-86	Alliance Premier League	5	42	13	5	24	58	73	-15	36	18th of 22	No Data	No Data	R1	R1	No Data
1986-87	Football Conference	5	42	10	14	18	48	73	-25	44	18th of 22; Relegated (Note: Despite finishing outside of the bottom three, Nuneaton Borough were relegated due to financial irregularities and safety concerns over their Manor Park ground.)	No Data	No Data	R1	QF	No Data
1987-88	SFL Premier Division	6	42	8	13	21	58	77	-19	37	21st of 22; Relegated	No Data	No Data	QR4	R1	No Data
1988-89	SFL Midland Division	7	42	19	9	14	71	58	+13	66	6th of 22	No Data	No Data	QR2	QR3	No Data
1989-90	SFL Midland Division	7	42	26	7	9	81	47	+34	85	3rd of 22	No Data	No Data	PR	R2	No Data
1990-91	SFL Midland Division	7	42	21	11	10	74	51	+23	70 (Note: Nuneaton Borough deducted 4 points for fielding an ineligible player.)	5th of 22	No Data	No Data	QR3	QR3	No Data
as Nuneaton Borough A.F.C.
1991-92	SFL Midland Division	7	42	17	11	14	68	53	+15	62	6th of 22	No Data	No Data	QR2	QR1	No Data
1992-93	SFL Midland Division	7	42	29	5	8	102	45	+57	92	1st of 22; Promoted as champions	No Data	No Data	R1	R2	No Data
1993-94	SFL Premier Division	6	42	11	8	23	42	66	-24	41	22nd of 22; Relegated	No Data	No Data	R2	R1	No Data
1994-95	SFL Midland Division	7	42	19	11	12	76	55	+21	68	7th of 22	No Data	No Data	QR4	QR2	No Data
1995-96	SFL Midland Division	7	42	30	5	7	82	35	+47	95	1st of 22; Promoted as champions	No Data	No Data	R1	R1	No Data
1996-97	SFL Premier Division	6	42	19	9	14	61	52	+9	66	7th of 22	No Data	No Data	QR4	QR1	No Data
1997-98	SFL Premier Division	6	42	17	6	19	68	61	+7	57	12th of 22	No Data	No Data	QR4	QR3	No Data
1998–99	SFL Premier Division	6	42	27	9	6	91	33	+58	90	1st of 22; Promoted as champions	No Data	No Data	QR3	R2	No Data
1999–00	Football Conference	5	42	12	15	15	49	53	–4	51	15th of 22	No Data	No Data	QR4	R2	No Data
2000–01	Football Conference	5	42	13	15	14	60	60	0	54	13th of 22	Marc McGregor	13	R2	R3	No Data
2001–02	Football Conference	5	42	16	9	17	57	57	0	57	10th of 22	No Data	No Data	QR4	R3	No Data
2002–03	Football Conference	5	42	13	7	22	51	78	−27	46	20th of 22; Relegated	No Data	No Data	QR4	R3	No Data
2003–04	SFL Premier Division	6	42	17	15	10	65	49	+16	66	4th of 22; Transferred	No Data	No Data	QR3	R2	No Data
2004–05	Conference North	6	42	25	6	11	68	45	+23	81	2nd of 22; Lost in play-off semi-final	No Data	No Data	QR2	R1	No Data
2005–06	Conference North	6	42	22	11	9	68	43	+25	77	3rd of 22; Lost in play-off semi-final	No Data	No Data	R3	QR3	No Data
2006–07	Conference North	6	42	15	15	12	54	45	+9	60	10th of 22	No Data	No Data	QR3	R1	No Data
2007–08	Conference North	6	42	19	14	9	58	40	+18	71	7th of 22; Liquidated and reformed	Andy Brown	No Data	QR4	QR3	No Data
as Nuneaton Town F.C.
2008–09	SFL Division One Midlands	8	42	28	8	6	85	31	+54	92	2nd of 22; Promoted via play-offs	Gez Murphy	No Data	QR2	PR	No Data
2009–10	SFL Premier Division	7	42	26	10	6	91	37	+54	88	2nd of 22; Promoted via play-offs	Chris Dillion	No Data	R1	R1	No Data
2010–11	Conference North	6	40	21	9	10	66	44	+22	72	6th of 22; Lost in play-off semi-final	Kyle Storer	12	R1	QR3	No Data
2011–12	Conference North	6	42	22	12	8	74	41	+33	72 (Note: Nuneaton Town deducted 6 points for fielding an ineligible player.)	5th of 22; Promoted via play-offs	Danny Glover	No Data	QR4	R1	No Data
2012–13	Conference Premier	5	46	14	15	17	55	63	−8	57	15th of 24	Andy Brown	19	R1	R1	No Data
2013–14	Conference Premier	5	46	18	12	16	54	60	−6	66	13th of 24	Louis Moult	17	QR4	R2	No Data
2014–15	Conference Premier	5	46	10	9	27	38	76	−38	36 (Note: Nuneaton Town deducted 3 points for fielding an ineligible player.)	24th of 24; Relegated	Andy Brown	8	QR4	R1	No Data
2015–16	National League North	6	42	20	13	9	71	46	+25	70 (Note: Nuneaton Town deducted 3 points for fielding an ineligible player in their win over Corby Town on 27 February 2016. They would have finished in 4th place and a play-off position without this points deduction.)	6th of 24	Aaron Williams	15	QR3	R1	No Data
2016–17	National League North	6	42	14	13	15	67	69	-2	55	12th of 22	Joe Ironside	14	QR2	R3	No Data
2017–18	National League North	6	42	14	13	15	50	57	-7	55	13th of 22	Ashley Chambers	20	QR3	R1	No Data
as Nuneaton Borough F.C.
2018–19	National League North	6	42	4	7	30	38	96	-58	19	22nd out of 22 Relegated	Dior Angus	9	QR2	QR3	No Data
