= List of Newport County A.F.C. seasons =

The List of Newport County A.F.C. seasons is a collection of results from all seasons played by the club from 1912 to the present day.

Season	League									FA Cup	Notes
Season	Division	P	W	D	L	F	A	Pts	Pos	FA Cup	Notes
1912–13	SL2	24	7	5	12	29	36	19	10/13	DNP	
1913–14	SL2	30	14	8	8	49	38	36	6/16	QR3	
1914–15	SL2	24	7	3	14	27	42	17	10/13	QR4	
1915–16	League play suspended during World War I									NH	
1916–17	League play suspended during World War I									NH	
1917–18	League play suspended during World War I									NH	
1918–19	League play suspended during World War I									NH	
1919–20	SL1	42	13	7	22	45	70	33	18/22	R1	
1920–21	D3	42	14	9	19	43	64	37	15/22	QR4	Founder member of Division 3
1921–22	D3S	42	11	12	19	44	61	34	20/22	R1	Founder member of Division 3 South
1922–23	D3S	42	8	11	23	40	70	27	22/22	QR5	Re-elected
1923–24	D3S	42	17	9	16	56	64	43	10/22	QR4	
1924–25	D3S	42	20	9	13	62	42	49	6/22	QR5	
1925–26	D3S	42	14	10	18	64	74	38	17/22	R2	
1926–27	D3S	42	19	6	17	57	71	44	9/22	R1	
1927–28	D3S	42	18	9	15	81	84	45	9/22	R1	
1928–29	D3S	42	13	9	20	69	86	35	16/22	R2	
1929–30	D3S	42	12	10	20	74	85	34	18/22	R2	
1930–31	D3S	42	11	6	25	69	111	28	21/22	R2	Not re-elected
1931–32	SLW	24	10	6	8	70	51	26	6/13	DNP	Elected back into Football League
1932–33	D3S	42	11	7	24	61	105	29	21/22	R2	Re-elected
1933–34	D3S	42	8	17	17	49	70	33	18/22	R2	
1934–35	D3S	42	10	5	27	54	112	25	22/22	R1	Re-elected
1935–36	D3S	42	11	9	22	60	111	31	21/22	R1	Re-elected
1936–37	D3S	42	12	10	20	67	98	34	19/22	R2	
1937–38	D3S	42	11	16	15	43	52	38	16/22	R3	
1938–39	D3S	42	22	11	9	58	45	55	1/22	R3	Champions
1939–40	D2	3	1	1	1	5	4	3	n/a	Aban.	Season abandoned
1940–41	League play suspended during World War II									NH	
1941–42	League play suspended during World War II									NH	
1942–43	League play suspended during World War II									NH	
1943–44	League play suspended during World War II									NH	
1945–46	League play suspended during World War II									R3	
1946–47	D2	42	10	3	29	61	133	23	22/22	R3	Relegated
1947–48	D3S	42	14	13	15	61	73	41	12/22	R2	
1948–49	D3S	42	14	9	19	68	92	37	15/22	R5	
1949–50	D3S	42	13	8	21	67	98	34	21/22	R3	Re-elected
1950–51	D3S	46	19	9	18	77	70	47	11/24	R4	
1951–52	D3S	46	21	12	13	77	76	54	6/24	R3	
1952–53	D3S	46	16	10	20	70	82	42	15/24	R3	
1953–54	D3S	46	19	6	21	61	81	44	15/24	R1	
1954–55	D3S	46	11	16	19	60	73	38	19/24	R1	
1955–56	D3S	46	15	9	22	58	79	39	19/24	R1	
1956–57	D3S	46	16	13	17	65	62	45	12/24	R4	
1957–58	D3S	46	17	14	15	73	67	48	11/24	R1	
1958	Placed in Division Three on league reorganisation										
1958–59	D3	46	17	9	20	69	68	43	17/24	R4	
1959–60	D3	46	20	6	20	80	79	46	13/24	R3	
1960–61	D3	46	17	11	18	81	90	45	13/24	R1	
1961–62	D3	46	7	8	31	46	102	22	24/24	R2	Relegated
1962–63	D4	46	14	11	21	76	90	39	20/24	R1	
1963–64	D4	46	17	8	21	64	73	42	15/24	R4	
1964–65	D4	46	17	8	21	85	81	42	16/24	R3	
1965–66	D4	46	18	12	16	75	75	48	9/24	R1	
1966–67	D4	46	12	16	18	56	63	40	18/24	R1	
1967–68	D4	46	16	13	17	58	63	45	12/24	R3	
1968–69	D4	46	11	14	21	49	74	36	22/24	R1	Re-elected
1969–70	D4	46	13	11	22	53	74	37	21/24	R3	Re-elected
1970–71	D4	46	10	8	28	55	85	28	22/24	R1	Re-elected
1971–72	D4	46	18	8	20	60	72	44	14/24	R1	
1972–73	D4	46	22	12	12	64	44	56	5/24	R3	
1973–74	D4	46	16	14	16	56	65	45	9/24	R1	
1974–75	D4	46	19	9	18	68	75	47	12/24	R2	
1975–76	D4	46	13	9	24	57	90	35	22/24	R1	Re-elected
1976–77	D4	46	14	10	22	42	58	38	19/24	R2	
1977–78	D4	46	16	11	19	65	73	43	16/24	R1	
1978–79	D4	46	21	10	15	66	55	52	8/24	R4	
1979–80	D4	46	27	7	12	83	50	61	3/24	R1	Promoted, Welsh Cup winners
1980–81	D3	46	15	13	18	64	61	43	12/24	R1	ECWC quarter finalists
1981–82	D3	46	14	16	16	54	54	58	16/24	R1	
1982–83	D3	46	23	9	14	76	54	78	4/24	R3	
1983–84	D3	46	16	14	16	58	75	62	13/24	R3	
1984–85	D3	46	13	13	20	55	67	52	18/24	R1	
1985–86	D3	46	11	18	17	52	65	51	19/24	R3	
1986–87	D3	46	8	13	25	49	86	37	24/24	R2	Relegated
1987–88	D4	46	6	7	33	35	105	25	24/24	R1	Relegated
1988–89	Conf	29	4	7	18	31	62	19	n/a	R1	Expelled and record expunged
1989	Club reformed and elected to the Hellenic League										
1989–90	Hell	34	23	6	5	71	28	75	1/18	DNP	Champions
1990–91	SLM	42	19	6	17	54	46	63	7/22	DNP	
1991–92	SLM	42	15	13	14	72	60	58	10/22	DNP	
1992–93	SLM	42	23	8	11	73	58	77	5/22	QR4	
1993–94	SLM	42	26	9	7	84	37	87	4/22	QR1	
1994–95	SLM	42	29	8	5	106	39	95	1/22	QR3	Champions
1995–96	SLP	42	13	13	16	53	59	52	14/22	QR3	
1996–97	SLP	42	9	13	20	40	60	40	21/22	QR2	Relegated
1997–98	SLS	42	21	6	15	83	65	69	7/22	QR1	
1998–99	SLM	42	26	7	9	92	51	85	2/22	PRE	Promoted
1999–00	SLP	42	16	18	8	67	50	66	7/22	QR3	
2000–01	SLP	42	17	10	15	70	61	61	10/22	QR2	
2001–02	SLP	42	19	9	14	61	48	66	5/22	R1	
2002–03	SLP	42	15	11	16	53	52	56	10/22	QR3	
2003–04	SLP	42	15	14	13	52	50	59	7/22	QR3	
2004	Placed in Conference South on league reorganisation										
2004–05	Conf S	42	13	11	18	56	61	50	18/22	QR4	Founder member of Conference South
2005–06	Conf S	42	12	8	22	50	67	44	18/22	QR2	
2006–07	Conf S	42	21	7	14	83	57	70	6/22	R1	
2007–08	Conf S	42	18	12	12	64	49	66	9/22	QR3	
2008–09	Conf S	42	16	11	15	50	51	59	10/22	QR2	
2009–10	Conf S	42	32	7	3	93	26	103	1/22	QR3	Champions
2010–11	Conf	46	18	15	13	78	60	69	9/24	QR4	
2011–12	Conf	46	11	14	21	53	65	47	19/24	R1	FA Trophy runners up
2012–13	Conf	46	25	10	11	85	60	85	3/24	QR4	Promoted
2013–14	L2	46	14	16	16	56	59	58	14/24	R2	League Trophy southern area semi-finalists
2014–15	L2	46	18	11	17	50	52	65	9/24	R1	
2015–16	L2	46	10	13	23	43	64	43	22/24	R3	
2016–17	L2	46	12	12	20	51	73	48	22/24	R2	
2017–18	L2	46	16	16	14	56	58	64	11/24	R4	
2018–19	L2	46	20	11	15	59	59	71	7/24	R5	Lost promotion play-off final
2019–20	L2	36	12	10	14	32	39	46	14/24	R3	Season abandoned
2020–21	L2	46	20	13	13	57	42	73	5/24	R3	Lost promotion play-off final
2021–22	L2	46	19	12	15	67	58	69	11/24	R1	
2022–23	L2	46	14	15	17	53	56	57	15/24	R2	
2023–24	L2	46	16	7	23	62	76	55	18/24	R4	
2024–25	L2	46	13	10	23	52	76	49	22/24	R1	
2025–26	L2	46	12	7	27	48	77	43	20/24	R2	

== Key ==
**Winners**	Runners-up	Promoted	Relegated

**Key to league record**
P – games played
W – games won
D – games drawn
L – games lost
F – goals for
A – goals against
Pts – points
Pos – final position

**Key to cup rounds**
DNP – did not participate
NH – not held
PRE – preliminary round
QR1 – first qualifying round
QR2 – second qualifying round
QR3 – third qualifying round
QR4 – fourth qualifying round, etc.
R1 – first round
R2 – second round
R3 – third round
R4 – fourth round
QF – quarter-finals
SF – semi-finals

**Key to divisions**
D2 – Football League Second Division
D3 – Football League Third Division
D3S – Football League Third Division South
D4/L2 – Football League Fourth Division/Football League Two
Conf – Football Conference
Conf S – Football Conference South
SLP – Southern League Premier Division
SLM – Southern League Midland Division
SLS – Southern League Southern Division
SLW – Southern League Western Division
SL1 – Southern League First Division
SL2 – Southern League Second Division
Hell – Hellenic League

Division shown in bold when it changes due to promotion or relegation.
