= List of Rushden & Diamonds F.C. seasons =

Rushden & Diamonds Football Club was an association football club based in Irthlingborough, Northamptonshire, England. The club was formed by a merger of Southern Football League side Rushden Town and United Counties league side Irthlingborough Diamonds in 1992. Rushden & Diamonds played in the Conference National following a short spell in the Football League at the start of the 2000s. The club were expelled from the Conference National on 11 June 2011. Their unstable financial position meant they could not guarantee to complete all their fixtures in the then upcoming 2011–12 season, and resulted in their dissolution in 2011.

== Key ==
Key to league record

- Level = Level of the league in the current league system
- Pld = Games played
- W = Games won
- D = Games drawn
- L = Games lost
- GF = Goals for
- GA = Goals against
- GD = Goals difference
- Pts = Points
- Position = Position in the final league table
- Top scorer and number of goals scored shown in bold when he was also top scorer for the division.

Key to cup records

- Res = Final reached round
- Rec = Final club record in the form of wins-draws-losses
- PR = Preliminary round
- QR1 (2, etc.) = Qualifying Cup rounds
- R1 (2, etc.) = Proper Cup rounds
- QF = Quarter-finalists
- SF = Semi-finalists
- RU = Runners-up
- W = Winners

== Seasons ==
Year	League	Lvl	Pld	W	D	L	GF	GA	GD	Pts	Position	Leading league scorer		FA Cup		League Cup		FA Trophy		Average home attendance (Note: Average home attendance = for league games only)
Year	League	Lvl	Pld	W	D	L	GF	GA	GD	Pts	Position	Name	Goals	Res	Rec	Res	Rec	Res	Rec	Average home attendance
1992–93	Southern Football League; Midland Division	7	42	25	10	7	85	41	44	85	**3rd of 22**	Andy Kirkup; Dale Watkins; Glen Donegal	12	QR2	2–0–1	-	-	-	-	
1993–94	Southern Football League; Midland Division	7	42	29	11	2	109	37	72	98	**1st of 22**; Promoted	Mike Nuttell	29	QR4	4–1–1	-	-	QR2	0–0–1	
1994–95	Southern Football League; Premier Division	6	42	19	11	12	99	65	34	68	**5th of 22**	Dale Watkins	25	QR1	0–0–1	-	-	SF	8–2–1	
1995–96	Southern Football League; Premier Division	6	42	29	7	6	99	41	58	94	**1st of 22**; Promoted	Darren Collins	30	R1	4–1–1	-	-	R1	0–0–1	
1996–97	Football; Conference	5	42	14	11	17	61	63	-2	53	**12th of 22**	Carl Alford	13	R1	4–1–1	-	-	R1	0–0–1	2,514
1997–98	Football; Conference	5	42	23	5	14	79	57	22	74	**4th of 22**	Darren Collins	29	QR4	0–1–1	-	-	R2	1–0–1	2,552
1998–99	Football; Conference	5	42	20	12	10	71	42	29	72	**4th of 22**	Darren Collins	17	R3	4–3–1	-	-	R4	2–1–1	2,996
1999–2000	Football; Conference	5	42	21	13	8	71	42	29	76	**2nd of 22**	Darren Collins; Michael McElhatton	11	R3	3–3–0	-	-	QF	4–2–1	3,299
2000–01	Football; Conference	5	42	25	11	6	78	36	42	86	**1st of 22**; Promoted	Duane Darby	24	R1	1–0–1	-	-	R5	2–0–1	3,876
2001–02	Football League; Third Division	4	46	20	13	13	69	53	16	73	**6th of 24**; Lost in playoff final	Onandi Lowe	19	R2	1–0–1	R2	1–0–1	-	-	4,404
2002–03	Football League; Third Division	4	46	24	15	7	73	47	26	87	**1st of 24**; Promoted	Paul Hall	16	R2	1–1–1	R2	0–1–1	-	-	4,330
2003–04	Football League; Second Division	3	46	13	9	24	60	74	−14	48	**22nd of 24**; Relegated	Onandi Lowe	15	R1	0–0–1	R1	0–0–1	-	-	4,457
2004–05	Football; League Two (Note: At the end of the previous season Football League Third Division was renamed as Football League Two.)	4	46	10	14	22	42	63	−21	44	**22nd of 24**	Billy Sharp	9	R2	1–0–1	R1	0–0–1	-	-	3,321
2005–06	Football; League Two	4	46	11	12	23	44	76	-32	45	**24th of 24**; Relegated	Drewe Broughton	10	R2	0–2–1	R1	0–0–1	-	-	3,162
2006–07	Conference; Premier	5	46	17	11	18	58	54	4	62	**12th of 24**	Simeon Jackson	19	R2	2–0–1	-	-	R3	2–0–1	2,045
2007–08	Conference; Premier	5	46	15	14	17	55	55	0	59	**16th of 24**	Simeon Jackson	16	R2	2–0–1	-	-	QF	3–0–1	1,586
2008–09	Conference; Premier	5	46	16	15	15	61	50	+11	63	**11th of 24**	Sam Smith; Rob Wolleaston; Lee Tomlin	8	QR4	0–0–1	-	-	R2	0–2–1	1,509
2009–10	Conference; Premier	5	44	22	13	9	77	39	+38	79	**4th of 23**; Lost playoff semifinal	Lee Tomlin	14	R2	2–0–1	-	-	R2	1–0–1	1,678
2010–11	Conference; Premier	5	46	16	14	16	65	62	+3	57 (Note: Deducted 5 points for submitting misleading financial information and subsequently expelled from the Football Conference on 11 June 2011.)	**13th of 24**	Aaron O'Connor	14	R1	1–0–1	-	-	R1	0–1–1	1,255
