= 1996–97 Southern Football League =

The 1996–97 Southern Football League season was the 94th in the history of the league, an English football competition.

Gresley Rovers won the Premier Division. However, as their ground failed to meet the required standard, second-placed Cheltenham Town were promoted to the Football Conference instead. Baldock Town, Chelmsford City and Newport were relegated to the Midland and Southern Divisions, whilst Sudbury Town (who had finished in thirteenth place) resigned from the league and dropped into the Eastern Counties League due to financial problems.

Tamworth, Forest Green Rovers, Rothwell Town and St Leonards Stamcroft (in their first season in the Southern League) were promoted to the Premier Division, the former two as champions of their divisions. Meanwhile, Midland Division club Dudley Town resigned from the league at the end of the season and did not compete in any competitions the following season. Leicester United folded during the season, and Buckingham Town were relegated to the United Counties League.

== Premier Division ==
The Premier Division consisted of 22 clubs, including 18 clubs from the previous season and four new clubs:

- Two clubs promoted from the Midland Division:
  - King's Lynn
  - Nuneaton Borough
- Two clubs promoted from the Southern Division:
  - Ashford Town (Kent)
  - Sittingbourne

=== League table ===
Southern Football League Premier Division
- Season: 1996–97
- Champions: Gresley Rovers
- Promoted: Cheltenham Town
- Relegated: Baldock Town; Chelmsford City; Newport
- Matches: 462
- Goals: 1,351 (2.92 per match)

Pos	Team	Pld	W	D	L	GF	GA	GD	Pts	Promotion or relegation
1	Gresley Rovers	42	25	10	7	75	40	+35	85	
2	Cheltenham Town	42	21	11	10	76	44	+32	74	Promoted to the Football Conference
3	Gloucester City	42	21	10	11	81	56	+25	73	
4	Halesowen Town	42	21	10	11	77	54	+23	73	
5	King's Lynn	42	20	8	14	65	61	+4	68	
6	Burton Albion	42	18	12	12	70	53	+17	66	
7	Nuneaton Borough	42	19	9	14	61	52	+9	66	
8	Sittingbourne	42	19	7	16	76	65	+11	64	
9	Merthyr Tydfil	42	17	9	16	69	61	+8	60	
10	Worcester City	42	15	14	13	52	50	+2	59	
11	Atherstone United	42	15	13	14	46	47	−1	58	
12	Salisbury City	42	15	13	14	57	66	−9	58	
13	Sudbury Town	42	16	7	19	72	72	0	55	Resigned to the Eastern Counties League
14	Gravesend & Northfleet	42	16	7	19	63	73	−10	55	Transferred to the Isthmian League
15	Dorchester Town	42	14	9	19	62	66	−4	51	
16	Hastings Town	42	12	15	15	49	60	−11	51	
17	Crawley Town	42	13	8	21	49	67	−18	47	
18	Cambridge City	42	11	13	18	57	65	−8	46	
19	Ashford Town (Kent)	42	9	18	15	53	79	−26	45	
20	Baldock Town	42	11	8	23	52	90	−38	41	Relegated to the Southern Division
21	Newport	42	9	13	20	40	60	−20	40	Relegated to the Southern Division
22	Chelmsford City	42	6	14	22	49	70	−21	32	Relegated to the Southern Division

Source: fchd.com rsssf.com
Rules for classification: 1) points; 2) goal difference; 3) number of goals scored.

== Midland Division ==
The Midland Division consisted of 22 clubs, including 17 clubs from the previous season and five new clubs:

- Three clubs relegated from the Premier Division:
  - Ilkeston Town
  - Stafford Rangers
  - VS Rugby
- Plus:
  - Raunds Town, promoted from the United Counties League
  - Shepshed Dynamo, promoted from the Midland Alliance

At the end of the season Hinckley Town merged with Midland Alliance club Hinckley Athletic to form Hinckley United.

=== League table ===
Southern Football League Midland Division
- Season: 1996–97
- Champions: Tamworth
- Promoted: Rothwell Town; Tamworth
- Matches: 420
- Goals: 1,348 (3.21 per match)

Pos	Team	Pld	W	D	L	GF	GA	GD	Pts	Promotion or relegation
1	Tamworth	40	30	7	3	90	28	+62	97	Promoted to the Premier Division
2	Rothwell Town	40	20	11	9	82	54	+28	71	Promoted to the Premier Division
3	Ilkeston Town	40	19	13	8	76	50	+26	70	
4	Grantham Town	40	22	4	14	65	46	+19	70	
5	Bedworth United	40	18	11	11	77	41	+36	65	
6	Solihull Borough	40	19	8	13	84	62	+22	65	
7	Bilston Town	40	18	10	12	74	57	+17	64	
8	Moor Green	40	18	7	15	88	68	+20	61	
9	Stafford Rangers	40	17	9	14	68	62	+6	60	
10	Raunds Town	40	16	11	13	61	65	−4	59	
11	Racing Club Warwick	40	16	10	14	70	72	−2	58	
12	Shepshed Dynamo	40	14	12	14	64	65	−1	54	
13	Redditch United	40	15	8	17	56	59	−3	53	
14	Paget Rangers	40	13	9	18	42	55	−13	48	
15	Dudley Town	40	12	10	18	69	89	−20	46	Resigned from league
16	Hinckley Town	40	11	11	18	39	63	−24	44	Merged with Hinckley Athletic to form Hinckley United
17	Stourbridge	40	10	9	21	61	81	−20	39	
18	Evesham United	40	9	12	19	55	77	−22	39	
19	VS Rugby	40	9	9	22	49	81	−32	36	
20	Corby Town	40	8	8	24	49	88	−39	32	
21	Sutton Coldfield Town	40	7	9	24	29	85	−56	30	
22	Leicester United	0	0	0	0	0	0	0	0	Club folded, record expunged

Source: fchd.com rsssf.com
Rules for classification: 1) points; 2) goal difference; 3) number of goals scored.

== Southern Division ==
The Southern Division consisted of 22 clubs, including 18 clubs from the previous season and four new clubs:

- Buckingham Town, transferred from the Midland Division
- Cirencester Town, promoted from the Hellenic League
- Dartford, promoted from the Kent League
- Stamco, who also changed name to St. Leonards Stamcroft, promoted from the Sussex County League

=== League table ===
Southern Football League Southern Division
- Season: 1996–97
- Champions: Forest Green Rovers
- Promoted: Forest Green Rovers; St. Leonards Stamcroft
- Relegated: Buckingham Town
- Matches: 462
- Goals: 1,444 (3.13 per match)

Pos	Team	Pld	W	D	L	GF	GA	GD	Pts	Promotion or relegation
1	Forest Green Rovers	42	27	10	5	87	40	+47	91	Promoted to the Premier Division
2	St. Leonards Stamcroft	42	26	9	7	94	48	+46	87	Promoted to the Premier Division
3	Havant Town	42	23	10	9	81	49	+32	79	
4	Weston-super-Mare	42	21	13	8	82	43	+39	76	
5	Margate	42	21	9	12	70	47	+23	72	
6	Witney Town	42	20	11	11	71	42	+29	71	
7	Weymouth	42	20	10	12	82	51	+31	70	
8	Tonbridge Angels	42	17	15	10	56	44	+12	66	
9	Newport (Isle of Wight)	42	15	15	12	73	58	+15	60	
10	Fisher Athletic	42	18	6	18	77	77	0	60	
11	Clevedon Town	42	17	9	16	75	76	−1	60	
12	Fareham Town	42	14	12	16	53	69	−16	54	
13	Bashley	42	15	8	19	73	84	−11	53	
14	Dartford	42	14	10	18	59	64	−5	52	
15	Waterlooville	42	14	9	19	58	67	−9	51	
16	Cirencester Town	42	12	12	18	50	68	−18	48	
17	Cinderford Town	42	13	7	22	64	76	−12	46	
18	Trowbridge Town	42	11	11	20	50	61	−11	44	
19	Yate Town	42	12	8	22	55	87	−32	44	
20	Fleet Town	42	12	6	24	47	91	−44	42	
21	Erith & Belvedere	42	9	10	23	60	95	−35	37	
22	Buckingham Town	42	2	8	32	27	107	−80	14	Relegated to the United Counties League

Source: fchd.com rsssf.com
Rules for classification: 1) points; 2) goal difference; 3) number of goals scored.

== See also ==
- Southern Football League
- 1996–97 Isthmian League
- 1996–97 Northern Premier League
