= 1996–97 FA Trophy =

FA Challenge Trophy
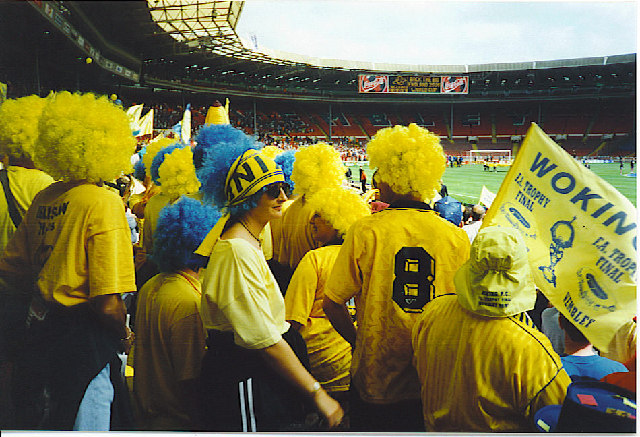
- Woking supporters watching their team win at Wembley in the Final.

Tournament details
- Country: England; Wales
- Teams: 177

Final positions
- Champions: Woking
- Runners-up: Dagenham & Redbridge

The 1996–97 FA Trophy was the twenty-eighth season of the FA Trophy.

== First qualifying round ==
The matches (not including replays) were played on October 19, 1996.

=== Ties ===
Tie	Home team	Score	Away team
1	Abingdon Town	0–2	Evesham United
2	Alfreton Town	4–4	Bilston Town
3	Ashford Town (Kent)	4–1	Hitchin Town
4	Atherstone United	0–2	Whitley Bay
5	Atherton Laburnum Rovers	1–1	Moor Green
6	Baldock Town	3–2	Stourbridge
7	Bedworth United	0–0	Gretna
8	Billericay Town	3–0	Berkhamsted Town
9	Bishop's Stortford	3–0	Croydon
10	Bromley	1–0	Uxbridge
11	Buckingham Town	0–1	Forest Green Rovers
12	Buxton	2–1	VS Rugby
13	Canvey Island	0–1	Heybridge Swifts
14	Chesham United	1–1	Walton & Hersham
15	Cinderford Town	2–3	Havant Town
16	Cirencester Town	2–2	Cambridge City
17	Dorchester Town	1–0	Waterlooville
18	Droylsden	1–1	Leigh RMI
19	Fareham Town	2–2	Weymouth
20	Fisher Athletic	2–2	Molesey
21	Grantham Town	1–0	Leek Town
22	Gravesend & Northfleet	2–2	St. Leonards Stamcroft
23	Grays Athletic	2–1	Bashley
24	Hampton	4–1	Trowbridge Town
25	Harrogate Town	2–3	Knowsley United
26	Hendon	1–1	Thame United
27	Hinckley Town	0–2	Worksop Town
28	Maidenhead United	4–2	Corby Town
29	Margate	1–2	Aldershot Town
30	Marlow	1–1	Witney Town
31	Matlock Town	1–4	Winsford United
32	Netherfield	2–3	Farsley Celtic
33	Newport (IOW)	3–3	Leyton Pennant
34	Nuneaton Borough	0–3	Congleton Town
35	Paget Rangers	0–1	Eastwood Town
36	Racing Club Warwick	1–2	Frickley Athletic
37	Raunds Town	4–1	Barton Rovers
38	Sittingbourne	3–2	Fleet Town
39	Solihull Borough	w/o–scr	Leicester United
40	Stafford Rangers	1–2	Curzon Ashton
41	Stocksbridge Park Steels	1–0	Sutton Coldfield Town
42	Tamworth	2–2	Great Harwood Town
43	Tonbridge Angels	0–2	Aylesbury United
44	Warrington Town	0–2	Lancaster City
45	Weston-super-Mare	2–0	Worthing
46	Whyteleafe	0–1	Yeading
47	Witton Albion	3–3	Workington
48	Wokingham Town	1–0	Erith & Belvedere
49	Yate Town	1–3	King's Lynn

=== Replays ===
Tie	Home team	Score	Away team
2	Bilston Town	4–1	Alfreton Town
5	Moor Green	6–1	Atherton Laburnum Rovers
7	Gretna	1–4	Bedworth United
14	Walton & Hersham	1–3	Chesham United
16	Cambridge City	6–5	Cirencester Town
18	Leigh RMI	1–3	Droylsden
19	Weymouth	7–0	Fareham Town
20	Molesey	1–2	Fisher Athletic
22	St. Leonards Stamcroft	4–3	Gravesend & Northfleet
26	Thame United	1–1	Hendon
30	Witney Town	2–1	Marlow
33	Leyton Pennant	2–1	Newport (IOW)
42	Great Harwood Town	1–0	Tamworth
47	Workington	1–0	Witton Albion

=== 2nd replay ===
Tie	Home team	Score	Away team
26	Thame United	0–3	Hendon

== Second qualifying round ==
The matches (no including replays) were played on November 9, 1996.

=== Ties ===
Tie	Home team	Score	Away team
1	Aldershot Town	3–0	Chesham United
2	Ashford Town (Kent)	6–1	Bishop's Stortford
3	Aylesbury United	1–1	Sittingbourne
4	Baldock Town	0–1	Evesham United
5	Billericay Town	0–4	Dorchester Town
6	Bilston Town	4–0	Great Harwood Town
7	Buxton	1–0	Eastwood Town
8	Chertsey Town	1–1	Yeading
9	Congleton Town	1–3	Solihull Borough
10	Curzon Ashton	0–2	Bedworth United
11	Dartford	1–1	Tooting & Mitcham United
12	Farsley Celtic	1–1	Worksop Town
13	Fisher Athletic	3–2	Havant Town
14	Forest Green Rovers	1–2	Cambridge City
15	Grantham Town	2–1	Winsford United
16	Hampton	0–1	St. Leonards Stamcroft
17	Hendon	1–3	Sutton United
18	Heybridge Swifts	2–1	Grays Athletic
19	Knowsley United	3–2	Flixton
20	Lancaster City	2–0	Droylsden
21	Lincoln United	3–4	Frickley Athletic
22	Maidenhead United	1–3	Bromley
23	Moor Green	2–1	Ilkeston Town
24	Oxford City	1–6	Basingstoke Town
25	Salisbury City	1–0	Witney Town
26	Staines Town	0–1	King's Lynn
27	Stocksbridge Park Steels	2–2	Shepshed Dynamo
28	Weston-super-Mare	1–3	Raunds Town
29	Weymouth	4–1	Cleveden Town
30	Whitley Bay	0–1	Bradford Park Avenue
31	Wokingham Town	2–0	Leyton Pennant
32	Workington	1–0	Redditch United

=== Replays ===
Tie	Home team	Score	Away team
3	Sittingbourne	2–1	Aylesbury United
8	Yeading	3–1	Chertsey Town
11	Tooting & Mitcham United	2–3	Dartford
12	Worksop Town	2–1	Farsley Celtic
27	Shepshed Dynamo	0–1	Stocksbridge Park Steels

== Third qualifying round ==
The matches (not including replays) were played on November 30, 1996.

=== Ties ===
Tie	Home team	Score	Away team
1	Aldershot Town	1–3	Dagenham & Redbridge
2	Ashton United	1–0	Burton Albion
3	Basingstoke Town	0–1	Hastings Town
4	Bedworth United	2–0	Accrington Stanley
5	Bishop Auckland	2–1	Stocksbridge Park Steels
6	Blyth Spartans	7–3	Bilston Town
7	Bradford Park Avenue	1–1	Barrow
8	Bromley	1–1	Worcester City
9	Buxton	1–1	Grantham Town
10	Cambridge City	1–1	Newport
11	Carshalton Athletic	0–3	Heybridge Swifts
12	Colwyn Bay	1–0	Frickley Athletic
13	Crawley Town	0–2	Chelmsford City
14	Dartford	0–0	Dulwich Hamlet
15	Fisher Athletic	1–2	Wokingham Town
16	Gloucester City	3–1	Kingstonian
17	Harrow Borough	2–2	Salisbury City
18	Knowsley United	2–2	Emley
19	Marine	0–1	Gainsborough Trinity
20	Moor Green	6–1	Dudley Town
21	Raunds Town	4–2	Bognor Regis Town
22	Rothwell Town	1–7	Workington
23	Runcorn	2–1	Solihull Borough
24	Sittingbourne	0–0	Yeading
25	Spennymoor United	1–0	Radcliffe Borough
26	St Albans City	3–1	King's Lynn
27	St. Leonards Stamcroft	6–0	Purfleet
28	Sudbury Town	2–3	Cheltenham Town
29	Sutton United	0–2	Dorchester Town
30	Weymouth	2–0	Ashford Town (Kent)
31	Worksop Town	0–0	Lancaster City
32	Yeovil Town	2–0	Evesham United

=== Replays ===
Tie	Home team	Score	Away team
7	Barrow	0–1	Bradford Park Avenue
8	Worcester City	3–0	Bromley
9	Grantham Town	2–1	Buxton
10	Newport	4–1	Cambridge City
14	Dulwich Hamlet	3–1	Dartford
17	Salisbury City	2–1	Harrow Borough
18	Emley	5–2	Knowsley United
24	Yeading	3–1	Sittingbourne
31	Lancaster City	4–2	Worksop Town

== 1st round ==
The teams that given byes to this round are Macclesfield Town, Stevenage Borough, Woking, Hednesford Town, Gateshead, Southport, Kidderminster Harriers, Northwich Victoria, Morecambe, Farnborough Town, Bromsgrove Rovers, Altrincham, Telford United, Stalybridge Celtic, Halifax Town, Kettering Town, Slough Town, Bath City, Welling United, Dover Athletic, Rushden & Diamonds, Hayes, Methyr Tydfil, Guiseley, Enfield, Hyde United, Halesowen Town, Gresley Rovers, Bamber Bridge, Boston United, Chorley and Boreham Wood.

The matches (not including replays) were played on January 18, 1997.

=== Ties ===
Tie	Home team	Score	Away team
1	Ashton United	5–3	Moor Green
2	Bath City	1–1	Stevenage Borough
3	Blyth Spartans	1–1	Grantham Town
4	Bromsgrove Rovers	2–1	Merthyr Tydfil
5	Cheltenham Town	1–2	Dulwich Hamlet
6	Colwyn Bay	6–0	Lancaster City
7	Dover Athletic	0–2	Dagenham & Redbridge
8	Emley	2–1	Boston United
9	Enfield	1–3	Boreham Wood
10	Gainsborough Trinity	1–3	Bradford Park Avenue
11	Gateshead	1–2	Runcorn
12	Gresley Rovers	3–3	Altrincham
13	Guiseley	2–1	Telford United
14	Hastings Town	1–3	Salisbury City
15	Hyde United	4–2	Bedworth United
16	Kettering Town	0–1	Chelmsford City
17	Kidderminster Harriers	3–0	Macclesfield Town
18	Morecambe	3–1	Chorley
19	Northwich Victoria	3–1	Hednesford Town
20	Raunds Town	0–1	Welling United
21	Rushden & Diamonds	1–2	Farnborough Town
22	Slough Town	2–2	Dorchester Town
23	Southport	0–0	Halesowen Town
24	Spennymoor United	0–2	Bishop Auckland
25	St Albans City	2–0	Weymouth
26	St. Leonards Stamcroft	1–0	Newport
27	Stalybridge Celtic	0–1	Halifax Town
28	Wokingham Town	0–1	Woking
29	Worcester City	1–2	Heybridge Swifts
30	Workington	2–5	Bamber Bridge
31	Yeading	0–3	Gloucester City
32	Yeovil Town	2–2	Hayes

=== Replays ===
Tie	Home team	Score	Away team
2	Stevenage Borough	6–1	Bath City
3	Grantham Town	1–1	Blyth Spartans
12	Altrincham	1–0	Gresley Rovers
22	Dorchester Town	1–1	Slough Town
23	Halesowen Town	0–2	Southport
32	Hayes	2–2	Yeovil Town

=== 2nd replays ===
Tie	Home team	Score	Away team
2	Grantham Town	3–1	Blyth Spartans
22	Slough Town	1–2	Dorchester Town
32	Yeovil Town	1–2	Hayes

== 2nd round ==
The matches (not including replays) were played on February 8, 1997.

=== Ties ===
Tie	Home team	Score	Away team
1	Ashton United	3–1	Bamber Bridge
2	Bishop Auckland	3–2	Northwich Victoria
3	Boreham Wood	0–1	Stevenage Borough
4	Bradford Park Avenue	0–1	Morecambe
5	Bromsgrove Rovers	1–1	Hyde United
6	Colwyn Bay	2–0	Southport
7	Dagenham & Redbridge	2–1	Chelmsford City
8	Farnborough Town	0–2	Altrincham
9	Gloucester City	3–0	Halifax Town
10	Grantham Town	0–1	Heybridge Swifts
11	Hayes	1–2	Runcorn
12	Kidderminster Harriers	0–0	Emley
13	Salisbury City	1–1	Dorchester Town
14	St Albans City	1–1	Woking
15	St. Leonards Stamcroft	2–1	Dulwich Hamlet
16	Welling United	1–1	Guiseley

=== Replays ===
Tie	Home team	Score	Away team
5	Hyde United	2–2	Bromsgrove Rovers
12	Emley	1–5	Kidderminster Harriers
13	Dorchester Town	3–2	Salisbury City
14	Woking	3–1	St Albans City
16	Guiseley	1–0	Welling United

=== 2nd replay ===
Tie	Home team	Score	Away team
5	Bromsgrove Rovers	0–2	Hyde United

== 3rd round ==
The matches (not including replays) were played on March 1, 1997.

=== Ties ===
Tie	Home team	Score	Away team
1	Altrincham	0–1	Bishop Auckland
2	Ashton United	2–0	Hyde United
3	Colwyn Bay	2–2	St. Leonards Stamcroft
4	Dorchester Town	2–3	Woking
5	Gloucester City	3–1	Runcorn
6	Heybridge Swifts	3–0	Kidderminster Harriers
7	Morecambe	0–0	Dagenham & Redbridge
8	Stevenage Borough	1–0	Guiseley

=== Replays ===
Tie	Home team	Score	Away team
3	St. Leonards Stamcroft	0–0	Colwyn Bay
7	Dagenham & Redbridge	2–1	Morecambe

=== 2nd replay ===
Tie	Home team	Score	Away team
3	St. Leonards Stamcroft	1–2	Colwyn Bay

== 4th round ==
The matches (not including replays) were played on March 22, 1997.

=== Ties ===
Tie	Home team	Score	Away team
1	Bishop Auckland	0–0	Gloucester City
2	Dagenham & Redbridge	1–0	Ashton United
3	Heybridge Swifts	0–1	Woking
4	Stevenage Borough	2–0	Colwyn Bay

=== Replay ===
Tie	Home team	Score	Away team
1	Gloucester City	4–3	Bishop Auckland

== Semi-finals ==
The first legs were played on April 5, 1997, and the second legs were played on April 12, 1997.

=== First leg ===
Tie	Home team	Score	Away team
1	Dagenham & Redbridge	0–0	Gloucester City
2	Woking	1–0	Stevenage Borough

=== Second leg ===
Tie	Home team	Score	Away team	Aggregate
1	Gloucester City	2–2	Dagenham & Redbridge	2–2
2	Stevenage Borough	2–1	Woking	2–2

=== Replays ===
Both replays were held on neutral grounds: the replay between Dagenham & Redbridge and Gloucester City was held at Slough Town, while the one between Stevenage Borough and Woking was at Vicarage Road, home to Watford.

Tie	Home team	Score	Away team
1	Dagenham & Redbridge	2–1	Gloucester City
2	Stevenage Borough	1–2	Woking

== Final ==
The match was played on May 18, 1997, at Wembley Stadium.

=== Tie ===
Home team	Score	Away team
Dagenham & Redbridge	0–1	Woking
