= 1994–95 Southern Football League =

The 1994–95 Southern Football League season was the 92nd in the history of the league, an English football competition.

Hednesford Town won the Premier Division and earned promotion to the Football Conference. Solihull Borough, Sittingbourne, Trowbridge Town and Corby Town were relegated to the Midland and Southern Divisions, whilst Newport, Salisbury City, Ilkeston Town and Baldock Town were promoted to the Premier Division, the former two as champions.

The clubs finishing bottom of the Midland and Southern Divisions, Armitage and Burnham, were relegated to level eight leagues.

== Premier Division ==
The Premier Division consisted of 22 clubs, including 17 clubs from the previous season and five new clubs:

- Two clubs promoted from the Midland Division:
  - Rushden & Diamonds
  - VS Rugby
- Two clubs promoted from the Southern Division:
  - Gravesend & Northfleet
  - Sudbury Town
- Plus:
  - Leek Town, transferred from the Northern Premier League Premier Division

=== League table ===
Southern Football League Premier Division
- Season: 1994–95
- Champions: Hednesford Town
- Promoted: Hednesford Town
- Relegated: Corby Town; Sittingbourne; Solihull Borough; Trowbridge Town
- Matches: 462
- Goals: 1,361 (2.95 per match)

Pos	Team	Pld	W	D	L	GF	GA	GD	Pts	Promotion or relegation
1	Hednesford Town	42	28	9	5	99	49	+50	93	Promoted to the Football Conference
2	Cheltenham Town	42	25	11	6	87	39	+48	86	
3	Burton Albion	42	20	15	7	55	39	+16	75	
4	Gloucester City	42	22	8	12	76	48	+28	74	
5	Rushden & Diamonds	42	19	11	12	99	65	+34	68	
6	Dorchester Town	42	19	10	13	84	61	+23	67	
7	Leek Town	42	19	10	13	72	60	+12	67	Transferred to the Northern Premier League Premier Division
8	Gresley Rovers	42	17	12	13	70	63	+7	63	
9	Cambridge City	42	18	8	16	60	55	+5	62	
10	Worcester City	42	14	15	13	46	34	+12	57	
11	Crawley Town	42	15	10	17	64	71	−7	55	
12	Hastings Town	42	13	14	15	55	57	−2	53	
13	Halesowen Town	42	14	10	18	81	80	+1	52	
14	Gravesend & Northfleet	42	13	13	16	38	55	−17	52	
15	Chelmsford City	42	14	6	22	56	60	−4	48	
16	Atherstone United	42	12	12	18	51	67	−16	48	
17	VS Rugby	42	11	14	17	49	61	−12	47	
18	Sudbury Town	42	12	10	20	50	77	−27	46	
19	Solihull Borough	42	10	15	17	39	65	−26	45	Relegated to the Midland Division
20	Sittingbourne	42	11	10	21	51	73	−22	43	Relegated to the Southern Division
21	Trowbridge Town	42	9	13	20	43	69	−26	40	Relegated to the Southern Division
22	Corby Town	42	4	10	28	36	113	−77	21 (Note: Corby Town were deducted one point.)	Relegated to the Midland Division

Source: fchd.com rsssf.com
Rules for classification: 1) points; 2) goal difference; 3) number of goals scored.

== Midland Division ==
The Midland Division consisted of 22 clubs, including 17 clubs from the previous season and five new clubs:

- Two clubs relegated from the Premier Division:
  - Moor Green
  - Nuneaton Borough
- Plus:
  - Buckingham Town, transferred from the Southern Division
  - Ilkeston Town, promoted from the West Midlands (Regional) League
  - Rothwell Town, promoted from the United Counties League

=== League table ===
Southern Football League Midland Division
- Season: 1994–95
- Champions: Newport
- Promoted: Ilkeston Town; Newport
- Relegated: Armitage 90
- Matches: 462
- Goals: 1,516 (3.28 per match)

Pos	Team	Pld	W	D	L	GF	GA	GD	Pts	Promotion or relegation
1	Newport	42	29	8	5	106	39	+67	95	Promoted to the Premier Division
2	Ilkeston Town	42	25	6	11	101	75	+26	81	Promoted to the Premier Division
3	Tamworth	42	24	8	10	98	70	+28	80	
4	Moor Green	42	23	8	11	105	63	+42	77	
5	Bridgnorth Town	42	22	10	10	75	49	+26	76	
6	Buckingham Town	42	20	14	8	55	37	+18	74	
7	Nuneaton Borough	42	19	11	12	76	55	+21	68	
8	Rothwell Town	42	19	7	16	71	71	0	64	
9	King's Lynn	42	18	8	16	76	64	+12	62	
10	Racing Club Warwick	42	17	11	14	68	63	+5	62	
11	Dudley Town	42	17	10	15	65	69	−4	61	
12	Bilston Town	42	17	8	17	73	64	+9	59	
13	Bedworth United	42	17	7	18	64	68	−4	58	
14	Evesham United	42	14	10	18	57	56	+1	52	
15	Hinckley Town	42	14	10	18	61	76	−15	52	
16	Stourbridge	42	15	7	20	59	77	−18	52	
17	Sutton Coldfield Town	42	12	10	20	62	72	−10	46	
18	Forest Green Rovers	42	11	13	18	56	76	−20	46	Transferred to the Southern Division
19	Redditch United	42	8	14	20	47	64	−17	38	
20	Leicester United	42	10	8	24	51	99	−48	38	
21	Grantham Town	42	8	9	25	55	93	−38	33	
22	Armitage 90	42	2	5	35	35	116	−81	11	Relegated to the Midland Alliance

Source: fchd.com rsssf.com
Rules for classification: 1) points; 2) goal difference; 3) number of goals scored.

== Southern Division ==
The Southern Division consisted of 22 clubs, including 17 clubs from the previous season and five new clubs:

- Three clubs transferred from the Midland Division:
  - Clevedon Town
  - Weston-super-Mare
  - Yate Town
- Two clubs relegated from the Premier Division:
  - Bashley
  - Waterlooville

=== League table ===
Southern Football League Southern Division
- Season: 1994–95
- Champions: Salisbury City
- Promoted: Baldock Town; Salisbury City
- Relegated: Burnham
- Matches: 462
- Goals: 1,477 (3.2 per match)

Pos	Team	Pld	W	D	L	GF	GA	GD	Pts	Promotion or relegation
1	Salisbury City	42	30	7	5	88	37	+51	97	Promoted to the Premier Division
2	Baldock Town	42	28	10	4	92	44	+48	94	Promoted to the Premier Division
3	Havant Town	42	25	10	7	81	34	+47	85	
4	Waterlooville	42	24	8	10	77	36	+41	80	
5	Ashford Town (Kent)	42	21	12	9	106	72	+34	75	
6	Weston-super-Mare	42	18	13	11	82	54	+28	67	
7	Bashley	42	18	11	13	62	49	+13	65	
8	Weymouth	42	16	13	13	60	55	+5	61	
9	Newport (Isle of Wight)	42	17	10	15	67	67	0	61	
10	Witney Town	42	14	14	14	57	57	0	56	
11	Clevedon Town	42	14	13	15	73	64	+9	55	
12	Tonbridge Angels	42	14	12	16	74	87	−13	54	
13	Margate	42	15	7	20	60	72	−12	52	
14	Braintree Town	42	12	13	17	64	71	−7	49	
15	Wealdstone	42	13	8	21	76	94	−18	47	Transferred to the Isthmian League Division Three
16	Yate Town	42	11	13	18	57	75	−18	46	
17	Fisher	42	9	16	17	54	70	−16	43	
18	Bury Town	42	11	8	23	59	86	−27	41	Transferred to the Midland Division
19	Erith & Belvedere	42	10	9	23	49	94	−45	39	
20	Poole Town	42	10	8	24	53	79	−26	38	
21	Fareham Town	42	10	8	24	46	91	−45	38	
22	Burnham	42	7	7	28	40	89	−49	28	Relegated to the Hellenic League

Source: fchd.com rsssf.com
Rules for classification: 1) points; 2) goal difference; 3) number of goals scored.

== See also ==
- Southern Football League
- 1994–95 Isthmian League
- 1994–95 Northern Premier League
