= 1997–98 Southern Football League =

The 1997–98 Southern Football League season was the 95th in the history of the league, an English football competition.

Forest Green Rovers won the Premier Division at the first attempt and earned promotion to the Football Conference for the first time in their history. Sittingbourne, Ashford Town (Kent) and St. Leonards Stamcroft were relegated to the Midland and Southern Divisions, whilst Bromsgrove Rovers were reprieved after the Southern Division runners-up Chelmsford City were denied in promotion due to ground grading. Ilkeston Town, Grantham Town and Weymouth were promoted to the Premier Division, the former two as champions.

No clubs were relegated to level eight leagues this season, though Southern Division clubs Trowbridge Town folded and Fareham Town voluntary demoted to the Wessex League.

== Premier Division ==
The Premier Division consisted of 22 clubs, including 16 clubs from the previous season and six new clubs:

- Two clubs promoted from the Midland Division:
  - Rothwell Town
  - Tamworth
- Two clubs promoted from the Southern Division:
  - Forest Green Rovers
  - St. Leonards Stamcroft
- Two clubs relegated from the Football Conference:
  - Bath City
  - Bromsgrove Rovers

=== League table ===
Southern Football League Premier Division
- Season: 1997–98
- Champions: Forest Green Rovers
- Promoted: Forest Green Rovers
- Relegated: Ashford Town (Kent); Sittingbourne; St.Leonards Stamcroft
- Matches: 462
- Goals: 1,372 (2.97 per match)

| Pos | Team | Pld | W | D | L | GF | GA | GD | Pts | Promotion or relegation |
|---|---|---|---|---|---|---|---|---|---|---|
| 1 | Forest Green Rovers | 42 | 27 | 8 | 7 | 93 | 55 | +38 | 89 | Promoted to the Football Conference |
| 2 | Merthyr Tydfil | 42 | 24 | 12 | 6 | 80 | 42 | +38 | 84 | |
| 3 | Burton Albion | 42 | 21 | 8 | 13 | 64 | 43 | +21 | 71 | |
| 4 | Dorchester Town | 42 | 19 | 13 | 10 | 63 | 38 | +25 | 70 | |
| 5 | Halesowen Town | 42 | 18 | 15 | 9 | 70 | 38 | +32 | 69 | |
| 6 | Bath City | 42 | 19 | 12 | 11 | 72 | 51 | +21 | 69 | |
| 7 | Worcester City | 42 | 19 | 11 | 12 | 53 | 44 | +9 | 68 | |
| 8 | King's Lynn | 42 | 19 | 10 | 13 | 64 | 64 | 0 | 67 | |
| 9 | Atherstone United | 42 | 17 | 12 | 13 | 55 | 49 | +6 | 63 | |
| 10 | Crawley Town | 42 | 17 | 8 | 17 | 63 | 60 | +3 | 59 | |
| 11 | Gloucester City | 42 | 16 | 11 | 15 | 57 | 57 | 0 | 59 | |
| 12 | Nuneaton Borough | 42 | 17 | 6 | 19 | 68 | 61 | +7 | 57 | |
| 13 | Cambridge City | 42 | 16 | 8 | 18 | 62 | 70 | −8 | 56 | |
| 14 | Hastings Town | 42 | 14 | 12 | 16 | 67 | 70 | −3 | 54 | |
| 15 | Tamworth | 42 | 14 | 11 | 17 | 68 | 65 | +3 | 53 | |
| 16 | Rothwell Town | 42 | 11 | 16 | 15 | 55 | 73 | −18 | 49 | |
| 17 | Gresley Rovers | 42 | 14 | 6 | 22 | 59 | 77 | −18 | 48 | |
| 18 | Salisbury City | 42 | 12 | 12 | 18 | 53 | 72 | −19 | 48 | |
| 19 | Bromsgrove Rovers | 42 | 13 | 6 | 23 | 67 | 85 | −18 | 45 | Reprieved from relegation |
| 20 | Sittingbourne | 42 | 12 | 8 | 22 | 47 | 66 | −19 | 44 | Relegated to the Southern Division |
| 21 | Ashford Town (Kent) | 42 | 8 | 5 | 29 | 34 | 85 | −51 | 29 | Relegated to the Southern Division |
| 22 | St. Leonards Stamcroft | 42 | 5 | 10 | 27 | 48 | 97 | −49 | 25 | Relegated to the Southern Division |

Source: fchd.com rsssf.com
Rules for classification: 1) points; 2) goal difference; 3) number of goals scored.

== Midland Division ==
The Midland Division consisted of 21 clubs, including 18 clubs from the previous season and three new clubs:

- Blakenall, promoted from the Midland Alliance
- Brackley Town, promoted from the Hellenic League
- Wisbech Town, promoted from the Eastern Counties League

Also, at the end of the previous season Hinckley Town merged with Midland Alliance club Hinckley Athletic to form Hinckley United.

=== League table ===
Southern Football League Midland Division
- Season: 1997–98
- Champions: Grantham Town
- Promoted: Grantham Town; Ilkeston Town
- Matches: 420
- Goals: 1,302 (3.1 per match)

| Pos | Team | Pld | W | D | L | GF | GA | GD | Pts | Promotion or relegation |
|---|---|---|---|---|---|---|---|---|---|---|
| 1 | Grantham Town | 40 | 30 | 4 | 6 | 87 | 39 | +48 | 94 | Promoted to the Premier Division |
| 2 | Ilkeston Town | 40 | 29 | 6 | 5 | 123 | 39 | +84 | 93 | Promoted to the Premier Division |
| 3 | Solihull Borough | 40 | 22 | 9 | 9 | 81 | 48 | +33 | 75 | |
| 4 | Raunds Town | 40 | 20 | 8 | 12 | 73 | 44 | +29 | 68 | Transferred to the Southern Division |
| 5 | Wisbech Town | 40 | 20 | 7 | 13 | 79 | 56 | +23 | 67 | |
| 6 | Moor Green | 40 | 20 | 7 | 13 | 72 | 55 | +17 | 67 | |
| 7 | Bilston Town | 40 | 20 | 5 | 15 | 69 | 57 | +12 | 65 | |
| 8 | Blakenall | 40 | 17 | 13 | 10 | 66 | 56 | +10 | 64 | |
| 9 | Stafford Rangers | 40 | 18 | 6 | 16 | 57 | 56 | +1 | 60 | |
| 10 | Redditch United | 40 | 16 | 11 | 13 | 58 | 40 | +18 | 59 | |
| 11 | Stourbridge | 40 | 16 | 9 | 15 | 56 | 55 | +1 | 57 | |
| 12 | Hinckley United | 40 | 15 | 11 | 14 | 59 | 56 | +3 | 56 | |
| 13 | Brackley Town | 40 | 15 | 7 | 18 | 44 | 57 | −13 | 52 | Transferred to the Southern Division |
| 14 | Bedworth United | 40 | 15 | 5 | 20 | 50 | 73 | −23 | 50 | |
| 15 | Racing Club Warwick | 40 | 11 | 9 | 20 | 49 | 56 | −7 | 42 | |
| 16 | Shepshed Dynamo | 40 | 9 | 14 | 17 | 55 | 74 | −19 | 41 | |
| 17 | Sutton Coldfield Town | 40 | 9 | 12 | 19 | 42 | 68 | −26 | 39 | |
| 18 | Paget Rangers | 40 | 9 | 12 | 19 | 40 | 75 | −35 | 39 | |
| 19 | VS Rugby | 40 | 8 | 12 | 20 | 53 | 93 | −40 | 36 | |
| 20 | Evesham United | 40 | 7 | 9 | 24 | 48 | 94 | −46 | 30 | |
| 21 | Corby Town | 40 | 2 | 8 | 30 | 41 | 111 | −70 | 14 | Transferred to the Southern Division |

Source: fchd.com rsssf.com
Rules for classification: 1) points; 2) goal difference; 3) number of goals scored.

== Southern Division ==
The Southern Division consisted of 22 clubs, including 19 clubs from the previous season and three new clubs, relegated from the Premier Division:

- Baldock Town
- Chelmsford City
- Newport

At the end of the season Havant Town and Waterlooville merged to form a new club Havant & Waterlooville.

=== League table ===
Southern Football League Southern Division
- Season: 1997–98
- Champions: Weymouth
- Promoted: Weymouth
- Matches: 462
- Goals: 1,470 (3.18 per match)

| Pos | Team | Pld | W | D | L | GF | GA | GD | Pts | Promotion or relegation |
|---|---|---|---|---|---|---|---|---|---|---|
| 1 | Weymouth | 42 | 32 | 2 | 8 | 107 | 48 | +59 | 98 | Promoted to the Premier Division |
| 2 | Chelmsford City | 42 | 29 | 8 | 5 | 86 | 39 | +47 | 95 | Denied promotion |
| 3 | Bashley | 42 | 29 | 4 | 9 | 101 | 59 | +42 | 91 | |
| 4 | Newport (Isle of Wight) | 42 | 25 | 9 | 8 | 72 | 34 | +38 | 84 | |
| 5 | Fisher Athletic | 42 | 25 | 5 | 12 | 87 | 50 | +37 | 80 | |
| 6 | Margate | 42 | 23 | 8 | 11 | 71 | 42 | +29 | 77 | |
| 7 | Newport | 42 | 21 | 6 | 15 | 83 | 65 | +18 | 69 | Transferred to the Midland Division |
| 8 | Witney Town | 42 | 20 | 9 | 13 | 74 | 58 | +16 | 69 | |
| 9 | Clevedon Town | 42 | 20 | 7 | 15 | 57 | 55 | +2 | 67 | Transferred to the Midland Division |
| 10 | Waterlooville | 42 | 17 | 7 | 18 | 69 | 64 | +5 | 58 | Merged into Havant & Waterlooville |
| 11 | Dartford | 42 | 17 | 7 | 18 | 60 | 60 | 0 | 58 | |
| 12 | Havant Town | 42 | 13 | 14 | 15 | 65 | 70 | −5 | 53 | Merged into Havant & Waterlooville |
| 13 | Fleet Town | 42 | 16 | 5 | 21 | 63 | 83 | −20 | 53 | |
| 14 | Tonbridge Angels | 42 | 14 | 10 | 18 | 49 | 55 | −6 | 52 | |
| 15 | Trowbridge Town | 42 | 14 | 6 | 22 | 55 | 69 | −14 | 48 | Club folded |
| 16 | Erith & Belvedere | 42 | 11 | 13 | 18 | 47 | 68 | −21 | 46 | |
| 17 | Fareham Town | 42 | 12 | 9 | 21 | 75 | 87 | −12 | 45 | Resigned to the Wessex League |
| 18 | Cirencester Town | 42 | 12 | 7 | 23 | 63 | 88 | −25 | 43 | |
| 19 | Weston-super-Mare | 42 | 12 | 5 | 25 | 49 | 86 | −37 | 41 | Transferred to the Midland Division |
| 20 | Baldock Town | 42 | 10 | 5 | 27 | 53 | 81 | −28 | 35 | |
| 21 | Cinderford Town | 42 | 6 | 5 | 31 | 40 | 112 | −72 | 23 | Transferred to the Midland Division |
| 22 | Yate Town | 42 | 5 | 7 | 30 | 44 | 97 | −53 | 22 | |

Source: fchd.com rsssf.com
Rules for classification: 1) points; 2) goal difference; 3) number of goals scored.

== See also ==
- Southern Football League
- 1997–98 Isthmian League
- 1997–98 Northern Premier League
