= 1995–96 Southern Football League =

The 1995–96 Southern Football League season was the 93rd in the history of the league, an English football competition.

The Max Griggs-funded Rushden & Diamonds won the Premier Division and earned promotion to the Football Conference. Ilkeston Town, Stafford Rangers and VS Rugby were relegated to the Midland and Southern Divisions, whilst Nuneaton Borough, Sittingbourne, King's Lynn and Ashford Town (Kent) were promoted to the Premier Division, the former two as champions.

In the Midland Division, the bottom two clubs, Bury Town and Bridgnorth Town, were relegated to level eight leagues. Poole Town, who finished bottom of the Southern Division with just one point (from a 0–0 draw with Bashley) dropped two levels into the Hampshire League.

== Premier Division ==
The Premier Division consisted of 22 clubs, including 16 clubs from the previous season and six new clubs:

- Two clubs promoted from the Midland Division:
  - Ilkeston Town
  - Newport
- Two clubs promoted from the Southern Division:
  - Baldock Town
  - Salisbury City
- Two clubs relegated from the Football Conference:
  - Merthyr Tydfil
  - Stafford Rangers

=== League table ===
Southern Football League Premier Division
- Season: 1995–96
- Champions: Rushden & Diamonds
- Promoted: Rushden & Diamonds
- Relegated: Ilkeston Town; Stafford Rangers; VS Rugby
- Matches: 462
- Goals: 1,361 (2.95 per match)

Pos	Team	Pld	W	D	L	GF	GA	GD	Pts	Promotion or relegation
1	Rushden & Diamonds	42	29	7	6	99	41	+58	94	Promoted to the Football Conference
2	Halesowen Town	42	27	11	4	70	36	+34	92	
3	Cheltenham Town	42	21	11	10	76	57	+19	74	
4	Gloucester City	42	21	8	13	65	47	+18	71	
5	Gresley Rovers	42	20	10	12	70	58	+12	70	
6	Worcester City	42	19	12	11	61	43	+18	69	
7	Merthyr Tydfil	42	19	6	17	67	59	+8	63	
8	Hastings Town	42	16	13	13	68	56	+12	61	
9	Crawley Town	42	15	13	14	57	56	+1	58	
10	Sudbury Town	42	15	10	17	69	71	−2	55	
11	Gravesend & Northfleet	42	15	10	17	60	62	−2	55	
12	Chelmsford City	42	13	16	13	46	53	−7	55	
13	Dorchester Town	42	15	8	19	62	57	+5	53	
14	Newport	42	13	13	16	53	59	−6	52	
15	Salisbury City	42	14	10	18	57	69	−12	52	
16	Burton Albion	42	13	12	17	55	56	−1	51	
17	Atherstone United	42	12	12	18	58	75	−17	48	
18	Baldock Town	42	11	14	17	51	56	−5	47	
19	Cambridge City	42	12	10	20	56	68	−12	46	
20	Ilkeston Town	42	11	10	21	53	87	−34	43	Relegated to the Midland Division
21	Stafford Rangers	42	11	4	27	58	90	−32	37	Relegated to the Midland Division
22	VS Rugby	42	5	10	27	37	92	−55	25	Relegated to the Midland Division

Source: fchd.com rsssf.com
Rules for classification: 1) points; 2) goal difference; 3) number of goals scored.

== Midland Division ==
The Midland Division consisted of 22 clubs, including 18 clubs from the previous season and four new clubs:

- Two clubs relegated from the Premier Division:
  - Corby Town
  - Solihull Borough
- Plus:
  - Bury Town, transferred from the Southern Division
  - Paget Rangers, promoted from the Midland Alliance

=== League table ===
Southern Football League Midland Division
- Season: 1995–96
- Champions: Nuneaton Borough
- Promoted: King's Lynn; Nuneaton Borough
- Relegated: Bridgnorth Town
- Matches: 462
- Goals: 1,516 (3.28 per match)

Pos	Team	Pld	W	D	L	GF	GA	GD	Pts	Promotion or relegation
1	Nuneaton Borough	42	30	5	7	82	35	+47	95	Promoted to the Premier Division
2	King's Lynn	42	27	5	10	85	43	+42	84 (Note: King's Lynn were deducted two points.)	Promoted to the Premier Division
3	Bedworth United	42	24	10	8	76	42	+34	81 (Note: Bedworth United were deducted one point.)	
4	Moor Green	42	22	8	12	81	47	+34	74	
5	Paget Rangers	42	21	9	12	70	45	+25	72	
6	Tamworth	42	22	3	17	97	64	+33	69	
7	Solihull Borough	42	19	9	14	77	64	+13	66	
8	Rothwell Town	42	17	14	11	79	62	+17	65	
9	Buckingham Town	42	18	9	15	74	62	+12	63	Transferred to the Southern Division
10	Dudley Town	42	15	16	11	83	66	+17	61	
11	Stourbridge	42	17	8	17	60	63	−3	59	
12	Bilston Town	42	16	9	17	61	62	−1	57	
13	Sutton Coldfield Town	42	16	9	17	62	67	−5	57	
14	Grantham Town	42	17	5	20	71	83	−12	56	
15	Redditch United	42	14	11	17	57	77	−20	53	
16	Leicester United	42	13	13	16	58	72	−14	52	
17	Hinckley Town	42	14	7	21	62	83	−21	49	
18	Racing Club Warwick	42	10	13	19	67	90	−23	43	
19	Evesham United	42	11	6	25	59	94	−35	39	
20	Corby Town	42	9	7	26	52	95	−43	34	
21	Bury Town	42	8	8	26	57	95	−38	32	Relegated to the Eastern Counties League
22	Bridgnorth Town	42	7	6	29	53	112	−59	27	Relegated to the Midland Alliance

Source: fchd.com rsssf.com
Rules for classification: 1) points; 2) goal difference; 3) number of goals scored.

== Southern Division ==
The Southern Division consisted of 22 clubs, including 17 clubs from the previous season and five new clubs:

- Two clubs relegated from the Premier Division:
  - Sittingbourne
  - Trowbridge Town
- Plus:
  - Cinderford Town, promoted from the Hellenic League
  - Fleet Town, promoted from the Wessex League
  - Forest Green Rovers, transferred from the Midland Division

=== League table ===
Southern Football League Southern Division
- Season: 1995–96
- Champions: Sittingbourne
- Promoted: Ashford Town (Kent); Sittingbourne
- Matches: 462
- Goals: 1,477 (3.2 per match)

Pos	Team	Pld	W	D	L	GF	GA	GD	Pts	Promotion or relegation
1	Sittingbourne	42	28	4	10	102	44	+58	88	Promoted to the Premier Division
2	Ashford Town (Kent)	42	25	9	8	75	44	+31	84	Promoted to the Premier Division
3	Waterlooville	42	24	8	10	87	44	+43	80	
4	Newport (Isle of Wight)	42	24	6	12	75	58	+17	78	
5	Braintree Town	42	24	8	10	93	70	+23	77 (Note: Braintree Town were deducted three points.)	Transferred to the Isthmian League Division Three
6	Weymouth	42	24	4	14	75	55	+20	76	
7	Havant Town	42	23	11	8	73	42	+31	74 (Note: Havant Town were deducted six points.)	
8	Forest Green Rovers	42	22	8	12	85	55	+30	74	
9	Trowbridge Town	42	18	8	16	86	51	+35	62	
10	Yate Town	42	17	8	17	85	71	+14	59	
11	Margate	42	18	5	19	68	62	+6	59	
12	Witney Town	42	16	11	15	60	54	+6	59	
13	Weston-super-Mare	42	16	9	17	78	68	+10	57	
14	Cinderford Town	42	16	8	18	74	77	−3	56	
15	Fisher	42	14	13	15	58	59	−1	55	
16	Bashley	42	14	11	17	63	61	+2	53	
17	Clevedon Town	42	15	6	21	70	80	−10	51	
18	Tonbridge Angels	42	13	10	19	58	79	−21	49	
19	Fleet Town	42	14	5	23	58	79	−21	47	
20	Fareham Town	42	12	5	25	71	97	−26	41	
21	Erith & Belvedere	42	4	4	34	38	111	−73	16	
22	Poole Town	42	0	1	41	17	188	−171	1	Demoted to the Hampshire League

Source: fchd.com rsssf.com
Rules for classification: 1) points; 2) goal difference; 3) number of goals scored.

== See also ==
- Southern Football League
- 1995–96 Isthmian League
- 1995–96 Northern Premier League
