= 1993–94 Southern Football League =

The 1993–94 Southern Football League season was the 91st in the history of the league, an English football competition.

Farnborough Town won the Premier Division and earned promotion to the Football Conference. Moor Green, Waterlooville, Bashley and Nuneaton Borough were relegated to the Midland and Southern Divisions, whilst Rushden & Diamonds, Gravesend & Northfleet, VS Rugby and Sudbury Town were promoted to the Premier Division, the former two as champions.

Despite neither finishing bottom of the table, both Dunstable and Canterbury City dropped into level eight leagues.

== Premier Division ==
The Premier Division consisted of 22 clubs, including 18 clubs from the previous season and four new clubs:

- Two clubs promoted from the Midland Division:
  - Gresley Rovers
  - Nuneaton Borough
- Plus:
  - Farnborough Town, relegated from the Football Conference
  - Sittingbourne, promoted from the Southern Division

=== League table ===
Southern Football League Premier Division
- Season: 1993–94
- Champions: Farnborough Town
- Promoted: Farnborough Town
- Relegated: Bashley; Moor Green; Nuneaton Borough; Waterlooville
- Matches: 462
- Goals: 1,243 (2.69 per match)

Pos	Team	Pld	W	D	L	GF	GA	GD	Pts	Promotion or relegation
1	Farnborough Town	42	25	7	10	74	44	+30	82	Promoted to the Football Conference
2	Cheltenham Town	42	21	12	9	67	38	+29	75	
3	Halesowen Town	42	21	11	10	69	46	+23	74	
4	Atherstone United	42	22	7	13	57	43	+14	73	
5	Crawley Town	42	21	10	11	56	42	+14	73	
6	Chelmsford City	42	21	7	14	74	59	+15	70	
7	Trowbridge Town	42	16	17	9	52	41	+11	65	
8	Sittingbourne	42	17	13	12	65	48	+17	64	
9	Corby Town	42	17	8	17	52	56	−4	59	
10	Gloucester City	42	17	6	19	55	60	−5	57	
11	Burton Albion	42	15	11	16	57	49	+8	56	
12	Hastings Town	42	16	7	19	51	60	−9	55	
13	Hednesford Town	42	15	9	18	67	66	+1	54	
14	Gresley Rovers	42	14	11	17	61	72	−11	53	
15	Worcester City	42	14	9	19	61	70	−9	51	
16	Solihull Borough	42	13	11	18	52	57	−5	50	
17	Cambridge City	42	13	11	18	50	60	−10	50	
18	Dorchester Town	42	12	11	19	38	51	−13	47	
19	Moor Green	42	11	10	21	49	66	−17	43	Relegated to the Midland Division
20	Waterlooville	42	11	10	21	47	69	−22	43	Relegated to the Southern Division
21	Bashley	42	11	10	21	47	80	−33	43	Relegated to the Southern Division
22	Nuneaton Borough	42	11	8	23	42	66	−24	41	Relegated to the Midland Division

Source: fchd.com rsssf.com
Rules for classification: 1) points; 2) goal difference; 3) number of goals scored.

== Midland Division ==
The Midland Division consisted of 22 clubs, including 19 clubs from the previous season and three new clubs:

- Armitage 90, promoted from the Midland Football Combination
- Clevedon Town, promoted from the Western League
- VS Rugby, relegated from the Premier Division

=== League table ===
Southern Football League Midland Division
- Season: 1993–94
- Champions: Rushden & Diamonds
- Promoted: Rushden & Diamonds; VS Rugby
- Matches: 462
- Goals: 1,451 (3.14 per match)

Pos	Team	Pld	W	D	L	GF	GA	GD	Pts	Promotion or relegation
1	Rushden & Diamonds	42	29	11	2	109	37	+72	98	Promoted to the Premier Division
2	VS Rugby	42	28	8	6	98	41	+57	92	Promoted to the Premier Division
3	Weston-super-Mare	42	27	10	5	94	39	+55	91	Transferred to the Southern Division
4	Newport	42	26	9	7	84	37	+47	87	
5	Clevedon Town	42	24	10	8	75	46	+29	82	Transferred to the Southern Division
6	Redditch United	42	19	11	12	79	62	+17	68	
7	Tamworth	42	19	7	16	82	68	+14	64	
8	Bilston Town	42	16	10	16	65	73	−8	58	
9	Stourbridge	42	17	6	19	71	75	−4	57	
10	Evesham United	42	16	8	18	50	60	−10	56	
11	Grantham Town	42	16	6	20	77	73	+4	54	
12	Bridgnorth Town	42	15	6	21	56	68	−12	51	
13	Racing Club Warwick	42	13	12	17	53	66	−13	51	
14	Dudley Town	42	13	10	19	64	61	+3	49	
15	Forest Green Rovers	42	12	12	18	61	84	−23	48	
16	Sutton Coldfield Town	42	12	8	22	53	75	−22	44	
17	Bedworth United	42	12	7	23	62	81	−19	43	
18	Hinckley Town	42	11	10	21	44	71	−27	43	
19	Leicester United	42	11	9	22	34	73	−39	42	
20	King's Lynn	42	9	11	22	47	72	−25	38	
21	Yate Town	42	10	6	26	48	86	−38	36	Transferred to the Southern Division
22	Armitage 90	42	8	11	23	45	103	−58	35	

Source: fchd.com rsssf.com
Rules for classification: 1) points; 2) goal difference; 3) number of goals scored.

== Southern Division ==
The Southern Division consisted of 22 clubs, including 20 clubs from the previous season and two new clubs:

- Tonbridge, promoted from the Kent League
- Weymouth, relegated from the Premier Division

At the end of the previous season Salisbury changed name to Salisbury City, and Fisher Athletic changed name to Fisher.

At the end of the season Tonbridge changed name to Tonbridge Angels.

=== League table ===
Southern Football League Southern Division
- Season: 1993–94
- Champions: Gravesend & Northfleet
- Promoted: Gravesend & Northfleet; Sudbury Town
- Matches: 462
- Goals: 1,428 (3.09 per match)

Pos	Team	Pld	W	D	L	GF	GA	GD	Pts	Promotion or relegation
1	Gravesend & Northfleet	42	27	11	4	87	24	+63	92	Promoted to the Premier Division
2	Sudbury Town	42	27	8	7	98	47	+51	89	Promoted to the Premier Division
3	Witney Town	42	27	8	7	69	36	+33	89	
4	Salisbury City	42	26	10	6	90	39	+51	88	
5	Havant Town	42	27	4	11	101	41	+60	85	
6	Ashford Town (Kent)	42	24	13	5	93	46	+47	85	
7	Baldock Town	42	26	7	9	76	40	+36	85	
8	Newport (Isle of Wight)	42	22	8	12	74	51	+23	74	
9	Margate	42	20	8	14	76	58	+18	68	
10	Weymouth	42	18	9	15	71	65	+6	63	
11	Tonbridge	42	19	5	18	59	62	−3	62	
12	Buckingham Town	42	14	14	14	43	42	+1	56	Transferred to the Midland Division
13	Braintree Town	42	16	7	19	72	84	−12	55	
14	Fareham Town	42	12	12	18	54	75	−21	48	
15	Poole Town	42	13	6	23	54	86	−32	45	
16	Burnham	42	10	9	23	53	92	−39	39	
17	Fisher	42	9	10	23	52	81	−29	37	
18	Dunstable	42	9	7	26	50	91	−41	34	Resigned to the United Counties League
19	Erith & Belvedere	42	9	5	28	40	72	−32	32	
20	Canterbury City	42	8	7	27	35	80	−45	31	Resigned to the Kent League
21	Wealdstone	42	6	7	29	45	95	−50	25	
22	Bury Town	42	3	5	34	36	121	−85	14	

Source: fchd.com rsssf.com
Rules for classification: 1) points; 2) goal difference; 3) number of goals scored.

== See also ==
- Southern Football League
- 1993–94 Isthmian League
- 1993–94 Northern Premier League
