= 1992–93 Southern Football League =

The 1992–93 Southern Football League season was the 90th in the history of the league, an English football competition.

Dover Athletic won the Premier Division to earned promotion to the Football Conference. VS Rugby and Weymouth were relegated to the Midland and Southern Division respectively, whilst Dartford withdrew from the league after four matches due to financial problems and joined the Kent League the following season. Nuneaton Borough, Sittingbourne and Gresley Rovers (in their first season in the Southern League) were promoted to the Premier Division, the former two as champions. Despite finishing second in the Southern Division, Salisbury were denied promotion due to ground grading, saving Premier Division club Moor Green from relegation. Barry Town left the Southern League to join the League of Wales, whilst Andover dropped into the Wessex League.

== Premier Division ==
The Premier Division consisted of 22 clubs, including 17 clubs from the previous season and five new clubs:

- Two clubs promoted from the Midland Division:
  - Hednesford Town
  - Solihull Borough
- Two clubs promoted from the Southern Division:
  - Hastings Town
  - Weymouth
- Plus:
  - Cheltenham Town, relegated from the Football Conference

=== League table ===
Southern Football League Premier Division
- Season: 1992–93
- Champions: Dover Athletic
- Promoted: Dover Athletic
- Relegated: VS Rugby; Weymouth
- Matches: 420
- Goals: 1,253 (2.98 per match)

Pos	Team	Pld	W	D	L	GF	GA	GD	Pts	Promotion or relegation
1	Dover Athletic	40	25	11	4	65	23	+42	86	Promoted to the Football Conference
2	Cheltenham Town	40	21	10	9	76	40	+36	73	
3	Corby Town	40	20	12	8	68	43	+25	72	
4	Hednesford Town	40	21	7	12	72	52	+20	70	
5	Trowbridge Town	40	18	8	14	70	66	+4	62	
6	Crawley Town	40	16	12	12	68	59	+9	60	
7	Solihull Borough	40	17	9	14	68	59	+9	60	
8	Burton Albion	40	16	11	13	53	50	+3	59	
9	Bashley	40	18	8	14	60	60	0	59 (Note: Bashley were deducted three points.)	
10	Halesowen Town	40	15	11	14	67	54	+13	56	
11	Waterlooville	40	15	9	16	59	62	−3	54	
12	Chelmsford City	40	15	9	16	59	69	−10	54	
13	Gloucester City	40	14	11	15	66	68	−2	53	
14	Cambridge City	40	14	10	16	62	73	−11	52	
15	Atherstone United	40	13	14	13	56	60	−4	50 (Note: Atherstone United were deducted three points.)	
16	Hastings Town	40	13	11	16	50	55	−5	50	
17	Worcester City	40	12	9	19	45	62	−17	45	
18	Dorchester Town	40	12	6	22	52	74	−22	42	
19	Moor Green	40	10	6	24	58	79	−21	36	
20	VS Rugby	40	10	6	24	40	63	−23	36	Relegated to the Midland Division
21	Weymouth	40	5	10	25	39	82	−43	23 (Note: Weymouth were deducted two points.)	Relegated to the Southern Division
22	Dartford	0	0	0	0	0	0	0	0	Resigned mid-season, record expunged, dropped into Kent League

Source: fchd.com rsssf.com
Rules for classification: 1) points; 2) goal difference; 3) number of goals scored.

== Midland Division ==
The Midland Division consisted of 22 clubs, including 19 clubs from the previous season and three new clubs:

- Evesham United, promoted from the Midland Combination
- Gresley Rovers, promoted from the West Midlands (Regional) League
- Weston-super-Mare, promoted from the Western League

At the end of the previous season Stroud reverted name to Forest Green Rovers, while Rushden Town merged with the United Counties League club Irthlingborough Diamonds to create new club Rushden & Diamonds, who took over place in the Midland Division.

=== League table ===
Southern Football League Midland Division
- Season: 1992–93
- Champions: Nuneaton Borough
- Promoted: Gresley Rovers; Nuneaton Borough
- Matches: 462
- Goals: 1,556 (3.37 per match)

Pos	Team	Pld	W	D	L	GF	GA	GD	Pts	Promotion or relegation
1	Nuneaton Borough	42	29	5	8	102	45	+57	92	Promoted to the Premier Division
2	Gresley Rovers	42	27	6	9	94	55	+39	87	Promoted to the Premier Division
3	Rushden & Diamonds	42	25	10	7	85	41	+44	85	
4	Barry Town	42	26	5	11	82	49	+33	83	Transferred to the League of Wales
5	Newport	42	23	8	11	73	58	+15	77	
6	Bedworth United	42	22	8	12	72	55	+17	74	
7	Stourbridge	42	17	9	16	93	79	+14	60	
8	Sutton Coldfield Town	42	17	9	16	82	78	+4	60	
9	Redditch United	42	18	6	18	75	79	−4	60	
10	Tamworth	42	16	11	15	65	51	+14	59	
11	Weston-super-Mare	42	17	7	18	79	86	−7	58	
12	Leicester United	42	16	9	17	67	67	0	57	
13	Grantham Town	42	16	9	17	60	73	−13	57	
14	Bilston Town	42	15	10	17	74	69	+5	55	
15	Evesham United	42	15	8	19	67	83	−16	53	
16	Bridgnorth Town	42	15	7	20	61	68	−7	52	
17	Dudley Town	42	14	8	20	60	75	−15	50	
18	Yate Town	42	15	5	22	63	81	−18	50	
19	Forest Green Rovers	42	12	6	24	61	97	−36	42	
20	Hinckley Town	42	9	11	22	56	89	−33	37 (Note: Hinckley Town were deducted one point.)	
21	King's Lynn	42	10	6	26	45	90	−45	36	
22	Racing Club Warwick	42	3	7	32	40	88	−48	16	

Source: fchd.com rsssf.com
Rules for classification: 1) points; 2) goal difference; 3) number of goals scored.

== Southern Division ==
The Southern Division consisted of 22 clubs, including 18 clubs from the previous season and four clubs, relegated from the Premier Division:

- Fisher Athletic
- Gravesend & Northfleet
- Poole Town
- Wealdstone

At the end of the season Salisbury changed name to Salisbury City, and Fisher Athletic changed name to Fisher.

=== League table ===
Southern Football League Southern Division
- Season: 1992–93
- Champions: Sittingbourne
- Promoted: Sittingbourne
- Matches: 462
- Goals: 1,498 (3.24 per match)

Pos	Team	Pld	W	D	L	GF	GA	GD	Pts	Promotion or relegation
1	Sittingbourne	42	26	12	4	102	43	+59	90	Promoted to the Premier Division
2	Salisbury	42	27	7	8	87	50	+37	88	
3	Witney Town	42	25	9	8	77	37	+40	84	
4	Gravesend & Northfleet	42	25	4	13	99	63	+36	79	
5	Havant Town	42	23	6	13	78	55	+23	75	
6	Sudbury Town	42	20	11	11	89	54	+35	71	
7	Erith & Belvedere	42	22	5	15	73	66	+7	71	
8	Ashford Town (Kent)	42	20	8	14	91	66	+25	68	
9	Braintree Town	42	20	6	16	95	65	+30	66	
10	Margate	42	19	7	16	65	58	+7	64	
11	Wealdstone	42	18	7	17	75	69	+6	61	
12	Buckingham Town	42	16	11	15	61	58	+3	59	
13	Baldock Town	42	15	9	18	59	63	−4	54	
14	Poole Town	42	15	7	20	61	69	−8	52	
15	Fareham Town	42	14	8	20	67	65	+2	50	
16	Burnham	42	14	8	20	53	77	−24	50	
17	Canterbury City	42	12	10	20	54	76	−22	46	
18	Newport (Isle of Wight)	42	9	16	17	44	56	−12	43	
19	Fisher Athletic	42	8	9	25	38	98	−60	33	
20	Andover	42	7	9	26	42	99	−57	30	Dropped into Wessex League
21	Dunstable	42	5	14	23	42	92	−50	29	
22	Bury Town	42	8	5	29	46	119	−73	29	

Source: fchd.com rsssf.com
Rules for classification: 1) points; 2) goal difference; 3) number of goals scored.

== See also ==
- Southern Football League
- 1992–93 Isthmian League
- 1992–93 Northern Premier League
