= 1988–89 West Midlands (Regional) League =

The 1988–89 West Midlands (Regional) League season was the 89th in the history of the West Midlands (Regional) League, an English association football competition for semi-professional and amateur teams based in the West Midlands county, Shropshire, Herefordshire, Worcestershire and southern Staffordshire.

== Premier Division ==
West Midlands League Premier Division
- Season: 1988–89
- Champions: Blakenall
- Matches: 420
- Goals: 1,316 (3.13 per match)

The Premier Division featured 16 clubs which competed in the division last season, along with six new clubs.

- Clubs promoted from Division One:
  - Millfields
  - Rocester
  - Stourport Swifts
  - Wolverhampton Casuals
- Plus:
  - Hinckley Town, joined from the Central Midlands League
  - Paget Rangers, relegated from the Southern Football League

=== League table ===
Pos	Team	Pld	W	D	L	GF	GA	GD	Pts
1	Blakenall	40	25	11	4	81	31	+50	86
2	Gresley Rovers	40	24	13	3	100	30	+70	85
3	Halesowen Harriers	40	23	9	8	74	43	+31	78
4	Paget Rangers	40	23	8	9	91	41	+50	77
5	Rushall Olympic	40	22	11	7	73	39	+34	77
6	Oldbury United	40	22	10	8	89	49	+40	76
7	Hinckley Town	40	23	6	11	96	38	+58	75
8	Lye Town	40	20	7	13	61	42	+19	67
9	Chasetown	40	19	9	12	54	48	+6	66
10	Malvern Town	40	17	12	11	81	47	+34	63
11	Rocester	40	14	15	11	67	49	+18	57
12	Harrisons	40	12	10	18	50	71	−21	46
13	Tividale	40	10	9	21	65	84	−19	39
14	Hinckley Athletic	40	9	12	19	50	76	−26	39
15	Wolverhampton Casuals	40	8	13	19	49	86	−37	37
16	Wednesfield Social	40	9	8	23	33	82	−49	35
17	Westfields	40	8	9	23	43	97	−54	33
18	Millfields	40	9	5	26	42	85	−43	32
19	Oldswinford	40	8	8	24	42	98	−56	32
20	Tipton Town	40	8	6	26	30	86	−56	30
21	Stourport Swifts	40	6	11	23	45	94	−49	29

Source: nonleaguematters
Rules for classification: 1) points; 2) goal difference; 3) number of goals scored.
