= 1997–98 FA Cup =

Tournament details
- Country: England; Wales

Final positions
- Champions: Arsenal (7th title)
- Runners-up: Newcastle United

Tournament statistics
- Top goal scorer(s): Andy Cole; Alan Shearer; Gareth Dodds (5 goals)

The 1997–98 FA Cup (known as the FA Cup sponsored by Littlewoods for sponsorship reasons) was the 117th staging of the FA Cup. The competition was won by Arsenal with a 2–0 victory against Newcastle United at Wembley Stadium.

== Calendar ==
Round	Initial Matches	New Entries	Clubs
Preliminary round	Saturday 30 August 1997	318	563 → 404
First round qualifying	Saturday 13 September 1997	129	404 → 260
Second round qualifying	Saturday 27 September 1997	none	260 → 188
Third round qualifying	Saturday 11 October 1997	none	188 → 152
Fourth round qualifying	Saturday 25 October 1997	20	152 → 124
First round proper	Saturday 15 November 1997	52	124 → 84
Second round proper	Saturday 6 December 1997	none	84 → 64
Third round proper	Saturday 3 January 1998	44	64 → 32
Fourth round proper	Saturday 24 January 1998	none	32 → 16
Fifth round proper	Saturday 14 February 1998	none	16 → 8
Sixth round proper	Saturday 7 March 1998	none	8 → 4
Semi-finals	Sunday 5 April 1998	none	4 → 2
Final	Saturday 16 May 1998	none	2 → 1

== Qualifying rounds ==
Most participating clubs that were not members of the Premier League or Football League competed in the qualifying rounds to secure one of 28 places available in the first round.

The winners from the fourth qualifying round were Gainsborough Trinity, Lincoln United, Colwyn Bay, Blyth Spartans, Northwich Victoria, Winsford United, Ilkeston Town, Emley, Solihull Borough, Morecambe, Southport, Boston United, Hereford United, Wisbech Town, Billericay Town, Tiverton Town, Boreham Wood, Margate, Basingstoke Town, Hendon, Farnborough Town, King's Lynn, Heybridge Swifts, Bromsgrove Rovers, Cheltenham Town, Hayes, Carshalton Athletic and Slough Town.

Billericay Town was appearing in the competition proper for the first time. Of the others, Basingstoke Town had last featured at this stage in 1989–90, King's Lynn had last done so in 1984-85, Gainsborough Trinity had last done so in 1983-84, Margate had last done so in 1972-73 and Ilkeston Town had last done so in 1956-57.

Northern Premier League side Emley made national headlines when, after defeating Workington, Durham City, Belper Town and Nuneaton Borough in the qualifying rounds and then seeing off Morecambe and Lincoln City in the first two rounds of the competition proper, they only lost narrowly to a West Ham United team containing the likes of Rio Ferdinand, David Unsworth, Eyal Berkovic, John Hartson and Frank Lampard in the third round.

== First round proper ==
The 48 teams from the Football League Second and Third Divisions entered in this round along with the 28 non-league qualifiers and Woking, Dagenham & Redbridge, Stevenage Borough and Hednesford Town who were given byes. Tiverton Town, from the Western League Premier Division at Step 8 of the football pyramid, was the lowest-ranked team in the draw - with the club going on to win this year's FA Vase and be crowned undefeated champions of their league, their first-round Cup tie against Football Conference (Step 5) outfit Cheltenham Town represented their only senior-level competitive loss of the season.

The matches were played on 14 November 1997. There were fourteen replays, with four ties requiring a penalty shootout to settle the results.

Tie no	Home team	Score	Away team	Date
1	Blackpool	4–3	Blyth Spartans (6)	15 November 1997
2	Chester City	2–1	Winsford United (6)	15 November 1997
3	Chesterfield	1–0	Northwich Victoria (5)	15 November 1997
4	Darlington	1–1	Solihull Borough (7)	15 November 1997
Replay	Solihull Borough	3–3	Darlington	26 November 1997
Darlington won 4–2 on penalties
5	AFC Bournemouth	3–0	Heybridge Swifts (6)	15 November 1997
6	Barnet	1–2	Watford	15 November 1997
7	Bristol City	1–0	Millwall	15 November 1997
8	Preston North End	3–2	Doncaster Rovers	15 November 1997
9	Rochdale	0–2	Wrexham	15 November 1997
10	Walsall	2–0	Lincoln United (7)	15 November 1997
11	Woking (5)	0–2	Southend United	15 November 1997
12	Notts County	2–0	Colwyn Bay (6)	16 November 1997
13	Lincoln City	1–1	Gainsborough Trinity (6)	15 November 1997
Replay	Lincoln City	3–2	Gainsborough Trinity	25 November 1997
14	Luton Town	0–1	Torquay United	15 November 1997
15	Shrewsbury Town	1–1	Grimsby Town	15 November 1997
Replay	Grimsby Town	4–0	Shrewsbury Town	25 November 1997
16	Wycombe Wanderers	2–2	Basingstoke Town (6)	15 November 1997
Replay	Basingstoke Town	2–2	Wycombe Wanderers	25 November 1997
Basingstoke Town won 5–4 on penalties
17	Brentford	2–2	Colchester United	15 November 1997
Replay	Colchester United	0–0	Brentford	25 November 1997
Colchester United won 4–2 on penalties
18	Bristol Rovers	2–2	Gillingham	14 November 1997
Replay	Gillingham	0–2	Bristol Rovers	25 November 1997
19	King's Lynn (6)	1–0	Bromsgrove Rovers (6)	15 November 1997
20	Plymouth Argyle	0–0	Cambridge United	15 November 1997
Replay	Cambridge United	3–2	Plymouth Argyle	25 November 1997
21	Hull City	0–2	Hednesford Town (5)	15 November 1997
22	Carlisle United	0–1	Wigan Athletic	15 November 1997
23	Oldham Athletic	1–1	Mansfield Town	15 November 1997
Replay	Mansfield Town	0–1	Oldham Athletic	25 November 1997
24	Exeter City	1–1	Northampton Town	15 November 1997
Replay	Northampton Town	2–1	Exeter City	25 November 1997
25	Scunthorpe United	2–1	Scarborough	15 November 1997
26	Margate (7)	1–2	Fulham	16 November 1997
27	Cheltenham Town (5)	2–1	Tiverton Town (8)	15 November 1997
28	Southport (5)	0–4	York City	15 November 1997
29	Morecambe (5)	1–1	Emley (6)	15 November 1997
Replay	Emley	3–3	Morecambe	25 November 1997
Emley won 3–1 on penalties
30	Carshalton Athletic (6)	0–0	Stevenage Borough (5)	15 November 1997
Replay	Stevenage Borough	5–0	Carshalton Athletic	24 November 1997
31	Hereford United (5)	2–1	Brighton & Hove Albion	15 November 1997
32	Rotherham United	3–3	Burnley	15 November 1997
Replay	Burnley	0–3	Rotherham United	25 November 1997
33	Hayes (5)	0–1	Boreham Wood (6)	15 November 1997
34	Hendon (6)	2–2	Leyton Orient	15 November 1997
Replay	Leyton Orient	0–1	Hendon	25 November 1997
35	Ilkeston Town (7)	2–1	Boston United (6)	15 November 1997
36	Slough Town (5)	1–1	Cardiff City	15 November 1997
Replay	Cardiff City	3–2	Slough Town	25 November 1997
37	Swansea City	1–4	Peterborough United	14 November 1997
38	Farnborough Town (5)	0–1	Dagenham & Redbridge (6)	15 November 1997
39	Hartlepool United	2–4	Macclesfield Town	15 November 1997
40	Billericay Town (7)	2–3	Wisbech Town (7)	15 November 1997

== Second round proper ==
The second round of the competition featured the winners of the first round ties. The matches were scheduled to be played on Saturday 6 December 1997, with nine replays and three penalty shootouts required, each of which featured a team who won on penalties in the previous round. Wisbech Town and Ilkeston Town, from the Southern League Midland Division at Step 7 of English football, were the lowest-ranked teams in the draw.

Tie no	Home team	Score	Away team	Date
1	Chester City	0–2	Wrexham	5 December 1997
2	AFC Bournemouth	3–1	Bristol City	7 December 1997
3	Preston North End	2–2	Notts County	6 December 1997
Replay	Notts County	1–2	Preston North End	16 December 1997
4	Wisbech Town (7)	0–2	Bristol Rovers	6 December 1997
5	Grimsby Town	2–2	Chesterfield	6 December 1997
Replay	Chesterfield	0–2	Grimsby Town	16 December 1997
6	Macclesfield Town	0–7	Walsall	6 December 1997
7	Lincoln City	2–2	Emley (6)	6 December 1997
Replay	Emley	3–3	Lincoln City	17 December 1997
Emley won 4–3 on penalties
8	Hednesford Town (5)	0–1	Darlington	6 December 1997
9	Fulham	1–0	Southend United	6 December 1997
10	Northampton Town	1–1	Basingstoke Town (6)	6 December 1997
Replay	Basingstoke Town	0–0	Northampton Town	16 December 1997
Northampton Town won 4–3 on penalties
11	Oldham Athletic	2–1	Blackpool	6 December 1997
12	Scunthorpe United	1–1	Ilkeston Town (7)	6 December 1997
Replay	Ilkeston Town	1–2	Scunthorpe United	17 December 1997
13	Cardiff City	3–1	Hendon (6)	6 December 1997
14	Cheltenham Town (5)	1–1	Boreham Wood (6)	6 December 1997
Replay	Boreham Wood	0–2	Cheltenham Town	16 December 1997
15	Torquay United	1–1	Watford	6 December 1997
Replay	Watford	2–1	Torquay United	16 December 1997
16	Rotherham United	6–0	King's Lynn (6)	6 December 1997
17	Wigan Athletic	2–1	York City	6 December 1997
18	Peterborough United	3–2	Dagenham & Redbridge (6)	6 December 1997
19	Colchester United	1–1	Hereford United (5)	6 December 1997
Replay	Hereford United	1–1	Colchester United	16 December 1997
Hereford United won 5–4 on penalties
20	Cambridge United	1–1	Stevenage Borough (5)	6 December 1997
Replay	Stevenage Borough	2–1	Cambridge United	15 December 1997

== Third round proper ==
The third round was scheduled for Saturday 3 January 1998, although six matches were postponed until later dates. This round marked the point at which the teams in the two highest divisions in the English league system, the Premiership and the Football League First Division, entered the competition. There were eight replays, with two of those games requiring a penalty shootout to settle the results. Emley, from Step 6, was the lowest-ranked team in the draw.

Tie no	Home team	Score	Away team	Date
1	Darlington (4)	0–4	Wolverhampton Wanderers (2)	14 January 1998
2	AFC Bournemouth (3)	0–1	Huddersfield Town (2)	13 January 1998
3	Liverpool (1)	1–3	Coventry City (1)	3 January 1998
4	Preston North End (3)	1–2	Stockport County (2)	3 January 1998
5	Watford (3)	1–1	Sheffield Wednesday (1)	3 January 1998
Replay	Sheffield Wednesday	0–0	Watford	14 January 1998
Sheffield Wednesday won 5–3 on penalties
6	Leicester City (1)	4–0	Northampton Town (3)	3 January 1998
7	Blackburn Rovers (1)	4–2	Wigan Athletic (3)	3 January 1998
8	Grimsby Town (3)	3–0	Norwich City (2)	3 January 1998
9	Crewe Alexandra (2)	1–2	Birmingham City (2)	3 January 1998
10	West Bromwich Albion (2)	3–1	Stoke City (2)	13 January 1998
11	Derby County (1)	2–0	Southampton (1)	3 January 1998
12	Everton (1)	0–1	Newcastle United (1)	4 January 1998
13	Swindon Town (2)	1–2	Stevenage Borough (5)	3 January 1998
14	Sheffield United (2)	1–1	Bury (2)	3 January 1998
Replay	Bury	1–2	Sheffield United	13 January 1998
15	Tottenham Hotspur (1)	3–1	Fulham (3)	5 January 1998
16	Manchester City (2)	2–0	Bradford City (2)	3 January 1998
17	Queens Park Rangers (2)	2–2	Middlesbrough (2)	3 January 1998
Replay	Middlesbrough	2–0	Queens Park Rangers	13 January 1998
18	Barnsley (1)	1–0	Bolton Wanderers (1)	3 January 1998
19	Bristol Rovers (3)	1–1	Ipswich Town (2)	3 January 1998
Replay	Ipswich Town	1–0	Bristol Rovers	13 January 1998
20	Portsmouth (2)	2–2	Aston Villa (1)	3 January 1998
Replay	Aston Villa	1–0	Portsmouth	14 January 1998
21	West Ham United (1)	2–1	Emley (6)	3 January 1998
22	Crystal Palace (1)	2–0	Scunthorpe United (4)	3 January 1998
23	Chelsea (1)	3–5	Manchester United (1)	4 January 1998
24	Wimbledon (1)	0–0	Wrexham (3)	4 January 1998
Replay	Wrexham	2–3	Wimbledon	13 January 1998
25	Cardiff City (4)	1–0	Oldham Athletic (3)	3 January 1998
26	Charlton Athletic (2)	4–1	Nottingham Forest (2)	3 January 1998
27	Arsenal (1)	0–0	Port Vale (2)	3 January 1998
Replay	Port Vale	1–1	Arsenal	14 January 1998
Arsenal won 4–3 on penalties
28	Cheltenham Town (5)	1–1	Reading (2)	13 January 1998
Replay	Reading	2–1	Cheltenham Town	20 January 1998
29	Leeds United (1)	4–0	Oxford United (2)	3 January 1998
30	Hereford United (5)	0–3	Tranmere Rovers (2)	13 January 1998
31	Rotherham United (4)	1–5	Sunderland (2)	3 January 1998
32	Peterborough United (4)	0–2	Walsall (3)	13 January 1998

== Fourth round proper ==
The fourth round ties were played with the 32 winners of the previous round. The matches were originally scheduled for Saturday 24 January 1998. There were five replays, with one penalty shootout. Stevenage Borough, from the Football Conference at Step 5, was the lowest-ranked team in the draw and the last non-league club left in the competition.

Tie no	Home team	Score	Away team	Date
1	Aston Villa	4–0	West Bromwich Albion	24 January 1998
2	Sheffield Wednesday	0–3	Blackburn Rovers	26 January 1998
3	Middlesbrough	1–2	Arsenal	24 January 1998
4	Ipswich Town	1–1	Sheffield United	24 January 1998
Replay	Sheffield United	1–0	Ipswich Town	3 February 1998
5	Tranmere Rovers	1–0	Sunderland	24 January 1998
6	Tottenham Hotspur	1–1	Barnsley	24 January 1998
Replay	Barnsley	3–1	Tottenham Hotspur	4 February 1998
7	Manchester City	1–2	West Ham United	25 January 1998
8	Coventry City	2–0	Derby County	24 January 1998
9	Manchester United	5–1	Walsall	24 January 1998
10	Crystal Palace	3–0	Leicester City	24 January 1998
11	Huddersfield Town	0–1	Wimbledon	24 January 1998
12	Cardiff City	1–1	Reading	24 January 1998
Replay	Reading	1–1	Cardiff City	3 February 1998
Reading won 4–3 on penalties
13	Charlton Athletic	1–1	Wolverhampton Wanderers	24 January 1998
Replay	Wolverhampton Wanderers	3–0	Charlton Athletic	3 February 1998
14	Leeds United	2–0	Grimsby Town	24 January 1998
15	Birmingham City	2–1	Stockport County	24 January 1998
16	Stevenage Borough (5)	1–1	Newcastle United	25 January 1998
Replay	Newcastle United	2–1	Stevenage Borough	4 February 1998

== Fifth round proper ==
The fifth-round matches were scheduled for Saturday 14 February 1998. There were four replays, with one penalty shootout.

The biggest surprise of the round was arguably Barnsley's 3–2 win (in the replay that followed a 1–1 draw) over Manchester United. Barnsley were in their first season as a top division side (and ended it with relegation), while United were defending league champions and were also in contention for the league title and the European Cup at this time, although they ended the season trophyless.

Tie no	Home team	Score	Away team	Date
1	Aston Villa	0–1	Coventry City	14 February 1998
2	Sheffield United	1–0	Reading	13 February 1998
3	Newcastle United	1–0	Tranmere Rovers	14 February 1998
4	West Ham United	2–2	Blackburn Rovers	14 February 1998
Replay	Blackburn Rovers	1–1	West Ham United	25 February 1998
West Ham United won 5–4 on penalties
5	Manchester United	1–1	Barnsley	15 February 1998
Replay	Barnsley	3–2	Manchester United	25 February 1998
6	Wimbledon	1–1	Wolverhampton Wanderers	14 February 1998
Replay	Wolverhampton Wanderers	2–1	Wimbledon	25 February 1998
7	Arsenal	0–0	Crystal Palace	15 February 1998
Replay	Crystal Palace	1–2	Arsenal	25 February 1998
8	Leeds United	3–2	Birmingham City	14 February 1998

== Sixth round proper ==
The sixth round ties were scheduled for the weekend of 7 and 8 March 1998. Two replays were played on the 17th, both of which went to penalties.

Wolverhampton Wanderers and Sheffield United, Division One sides, both progressed to the semi-finals at the expense of Premier League sides. Wolverhampton Wanderers were particularly impressive in doing this, as the side they eliminated from the cup (Leeds United) went on to finish fifth in the Premier League.

7 March 1998
15:00

Coventry City	1–1	Sheffield United
Dublin 32' (pen.)		Marcelo 45'

Highfield Road, Coventry
Attendance: 23,084
Referee: Steve Dunn
7 March 1998
15:00

Leeds United	0–1	Wolverhampton Wanderers
		Goodman 82'

Elland Road, Leeds
Attendance: 39,902
Referee: Paul Durkin
8 March 1998
15:00

Arsenal	1–1	West Ham United
Bergkamp 26' (pen.)		Pearce 12'

Highbury, London
Attendance: 38,077
Referee: Mike Reed
8 March 1998
16:30

Newcastle United	3–1	Barnsley
Ketsbaia 16'; Speed 27'; Batty 90'		Liddell 57'

St James' Park, Newcastle
Attendance: 36,695
Referee: Neale Barry

=== Replays ===
17 March 1998
19:45

Sheffield United	1–1	Coventry City
Holdsworth 89'		Telfer 10'

Bramall Lane, Sheffield
Attendance: 29,034
Referee: Steve Dunn

Sheffield United won 3–1 on penalties.

17 March 1998
19:45

West Ham United	1–1	Arsenal
Hartson 81'		Anelka 45'; Bergkamp (red card)

Upton Park, West Ham, London
Attendance: 25,859
Referee: Mike Reed

Arsenal won 4–3 on penalties.

== Semi-finals ==
The two semi-final matches were played on Sunday 5 April 1998. Both ties were played at neutral venues and resulted in victories for Arsenal and Newcastle United, who went on to meet in the final at Wembley. The losing sides were both Division One teams, who endured further disappointment over the next few weeks by being pipped to promotion.

5 April 1998
12:00

Wolverhampton Wanderers	0–1	Arsenal
		Wreh 12'

Villa Park, Birmingham
Attendance: 39,372
Referee: Stephen Lodge (West Yorkshire)

5 April 1998
15:00

Newcastle United	1–0	Sheffield United
Shearer 60'

Old Trafford, Manchester
Attendance: 53,452
Referee: Graham Poll

== Final ==
The 1998 FA Cup Final was contested by Arsenal and Newcastle United at Wembley on 16 May 1998. Arsenal won 2–0, with goals by Marc Overmars and Nicolas Anelka to complete their second league title/FA Cup double. They joined Manchester United as only the second English team to achieve this, although Arsenal did so with an entirely different set of players (their first double was in 1971, whereas United's doubles were in 1994 and 1996).

16 May 1998
15:00 BST

Arsenal	2–0	Newcastle United
Overmars 23'; Anelka 69'	(Report)

Wembley, London
Attendance: 79,183
Referee: Paul Durkin (Dorset)

Arsenal	Newcastle United

== Media coverage ==
In the United Kingdom, ITV were the free to air broadcasters, taking over from the BBC, while Sky Sports were the subscription broadcasters for the tenth consecutive season. with the BBC retaining free-to-air highlights. The 1998 FA Cup Final was Brian Moore's last domestic football commentary for ITV before his retirement after the World Cup

The matches shown live on ITV Sport were:

• Everton 0-1 Newcastle United (R3)

• Manchester City 1-2 West Ham United (R4)

• Arsenal 0-0 Crystal Palace (R5)

• Arsenal 1-1 West Ham United (QF)

• Wolverhampton Wanderers 0-1 Arsenal (SF)

• Arsenal 2-0 Newcastle United (Final)

The matches shown live on Sky Sports were:

• Swansea City 1-4 Peterborough United (R1)

• Margate 1-2 Fulham (R1)

• Burnley 0-3 Rotherham United (R1 Replay)

• Chester City 0-2 Wrexham (R2)

• AFC Bournemouth 3-1 Bristol City (R2)

• Basingstoke Town 0-0 Northampton Town (R2 Replay)

• Chelsea 3-5 Manchester United (R3)

• Tottenham Hotspur 3-1 Fulham (R3)

• Port Vale 1-1 Arsenal (R3 Replay)

• Stevenage Borough 1-1 Newcastle United (R4)

• Sheffield Wednesday 0-3 Blackburn Rovers (R4)

• Newcastle United 2-1 Stevenage Borough (R4 Replay)

• Manchester United 1-1 Barnsley (R5)

• Barnsley 3-2 Manchester United (R5 Replay)

• Newcastle United 3-1 Barnsley (QF)

• West Ham United 1-1 Arsenal (QF Replay)

• Newcastle United 1-0 Sheffield United (SF)

• Arsenal 2-0 Newcastle United (Final)
