= 1986–87 Eastern Counties Football League =

The 1986–87 season was the 45th in the history of Eastern Counties Football League a football competition in England.

The league featured 22 clubs which competed in the league last season, along with one new club:

- Watton United, joined from the Anglian Combination

Sudbury Town were champions for the second season in a row, winning their fifth Eastern Counties Football League title, while Bury Town, who finished third were promoted to the Southern Football League, returning after eleven seasons in the Eastern Counties League.

== League table ==
Eastern Counties Football League
- Season: 1986–87
- Champions: Sudbury Town
- Promoted: Bury Town
- Matches: 506
- Goals: 1,612 (3.19 per match)

| Pos | Team | Pld | W | D | L | GF | GA | GD | Pts | Promotion or relegation |
|---|---|---|---|---|---|---|---|---|---|---|
| 1 | Sudbury Town | 44 | 29 | 9 | 6 | 113 | 43 | +70 | 67 | |
| 2 | Braintree Town | 44 | 28 | 9 | 7 | 106 | 49 | +57 | 65 | |
| 3 | Bury Town | 44 | 26 | 10 | 8 | 114 | 52 | +62 | 62 | Promoted to the Southern Football League |
| 4 | March Town United | 44 | 28 | 6 | 10 | 80 | 45 | +35 | 62 | |
| 5 | Tiptree United | 44 | 24 | 12 | 8 | 82 | 50 | +32 | 60 | |
| 6 | Great Yarmouth Town | 44 | 22 | 13 | 9 | 70 | 33 | +37 | 57 | |
| 7 | Colchester United reserves | 44 | 19 | 11 | 14 | 82 | 58 | +24 | 49 | |
| 8 | Watton United | 44 | 18 | 12 | 14 | 77 | 71 | +6 | 48 | |
| 9 | Lowestoft Town | 44 | 15 | 17 | 12 | 53 | 53 | 0 | 47 | |
| 10 | Stowmarket Town | 44 | 18 | 10 | 16 | 94 | 66 | +28 | 46 | |
| 11 | Wisbech Town | 44 | 17 | 12 | 15 | 72 | 60 | +12 | 46 | |
| 12 | Clacton Town | 44 | 14 | 18 | 12 | 60 | 61 | −1 | 46 | |
| 13 | Haverhill Rovers | 44 | 13 | 15 | 16 | 60 | 57 | +3 | 41 | |
| 14 | Harwich & Parkeston | 44 | 15 | 9 | 20 | 70 | 76 | −6 | 39 | |
| 15 | Chatteris Town | 44 | 16 | 7 | 21 | 62 | 82 | −20 | 39 | |
| 16 | Newmarket Town | 44 | 12 | 13 | 19 | 43 | 62 | −19 | 37 | |
| 17 | Felixstowe Town | 44 | 12 | 11 | 21 | 56 | 92 | −36 | 35 | |
| 18 | Gorleston | 44 | 11 | 11 | 22 | 73 | 101 | −28 | 33 | |
| 19 | Brantham Athletic | 44 | 10 | 10 | 24 | 59 | 102 | −43 | 30 | |
| 20 | Soham Town Rangers | 44 | 11 | 7 | 26 | 62 | 112 | −50 | 29 | |
| 21 | Histon | 44 | 8 | 11 | 25 | 47 | 88 | −41 | 27 | |
| 22 | Ely City | 44 | 11 | 4 | 29 | 44 | 102 | −58 | 26 | |
| 23 | Thetford Town | 44 | 4 | 13 | 27 | 33 | 97 | −64 | 21 | |

Source: fchd
Rules for classification: 1) points; 2) goal difference; 3) number of goals scored.
