= 1995–96 United Counties League =

The 1995–96 United Counties League season was the 89th in the history of the United Counties League, a football competition in England.

== Premier Division ==
United Counties League Premier Division
- Season: 1995–96
- Champions: Raunds Town
- Promoted: Raunds Town
- Matches: 380
- Goals: 1,390 (3.66 per match)

The Premier Division featured 19 clubs which competed in the division last season, along with one new club:

- St. Neots Town, promoted from Division One

=== League table ===
Pos	Team	Pld	W	D	L	GF	GA	GD	Pts	Promotion or relegation
1	Raunds Town	38	26	9	3	111	28	+83	87	Promoted to the Southern Football League
2	Stotfold	38	26	9	3	94	37	+57	87	
3	Desborough Town	38	25	4	9	104	56	+48	79	
4	Cogenhoe United	38	21	8	9	84	56	+28	71	
5	Eynesbury Rovers	38	19	9	10	64	39	+25	66	
6	Spalding United	38	19	8	11	62	51	+11	65	
7	Stamford	38	18	10	10	88	56	+32	64	
8	Long Buckby	38	17	10	11	80	63	+17	61	
9	Holbeach United	38	16	12	10	68	45	+23	60	
10	Boston Town	38	15	12	11	74	49	+25	57	
11	Mirrlees Blackstone	38	16	9	13	70	71	−1	57	
12	Stewarts & Lloyds Corby	38	15	8	15	90	77	+13	53	
13	Northampton Spencer	38	12	6	20	67	88	−21	42	
14	Wootton Blue Cross	38	11	9	18	54	78	−24	42	
15	St. Neots Town	38	11	4	23	59	96	−37	37	
16	Potton United	38	9	9	20	46	76	−30	36	
17	Wellingborough Town	38	10	6	22	57	88	−31	36	
18	Bourne Town	38	8	9	21	49	103	−54	33	
19	Newport Pagnell Town	38	4	7	27	37	128	−91	19	
20	Kempston Rovers	38	1	4	33	32	105	−73	7	

Source: fchd
Rules for classification: 1) points; 2) goal difference; 3) number of goals scored.

== Division One ==
United Counties League Division One
- Season: 1995–96
- Champions: Ford Sports Daventry
- Promoted: Ford Sports Daventry
- Matches: 342
- Goals: 1,217 (3.56 per match)

Division One featured 17 clubs which competed in the division last season, along with two new clubs:

- Rothwell Corinthians, joined from the East Midlands Alliance
- Yaxley, joined from the West Anglia League

=== League table ===
Pos	Team	Pld	W	D	L	GF	GA	GD	Pts	Promotion
1	Ford Sports Daventry	36	27	5	4	105	42	+63	86	Promoted to the Premier Division
2	Higham Town	36	27	4	5	94	33	+61	85	
3	Bugbrooke St Michaels	36	25	6	5	91	31	+60	81	
4	Rothwell Corinthians	36	22	8	6	79	29	+50	74	
5	Olney Town	36	24	2	10	85	47	+38	74	
6	Northampton Vanaid	36	19	8	9	89	63	+26	65	
7	Wellingborough Whitworth	36	20	4	12	72	35	+37	64	
8	Ramsey Town	36	16	7	13	60	47	+13	55	Resigned to the Peterborough & District League
9	Burton Park Wanderers	36	13	8	15	50	46	+4	47	
10	Yaxley	36	10	12	14	51	67	−16	42	
11	Thrapston Venturas	36	12	5	19	64	70	−6	41	
12	Daventry Town	36	12	5	19	55	85	−30	41	
13	Cottingham	36	9	8	19	41	68	−27	35	
14	St Ives Town	36	7	12	17	50	62	−12	33	
15	Blisworth	36	8	8	20	59	103	−44	32	
16	Harrowby United	36	9	3	24	42	115	−73	30	
17	Sharnbrook	36	8	5	23	50	101	−51	29	
18	Northampton ON Chenecks	36	6	7	23	38	72	−34	25	
19	Irchester United	36	6	7	23	42	101	−59	25	

Source: fchd
Rules for classification: 1) points; 2) goal difference; 3) number of goals scored.
