= Damson Park =

Association football stadium in Solihull, England

Coordinates: 52°26′20″N 1°45′26″W

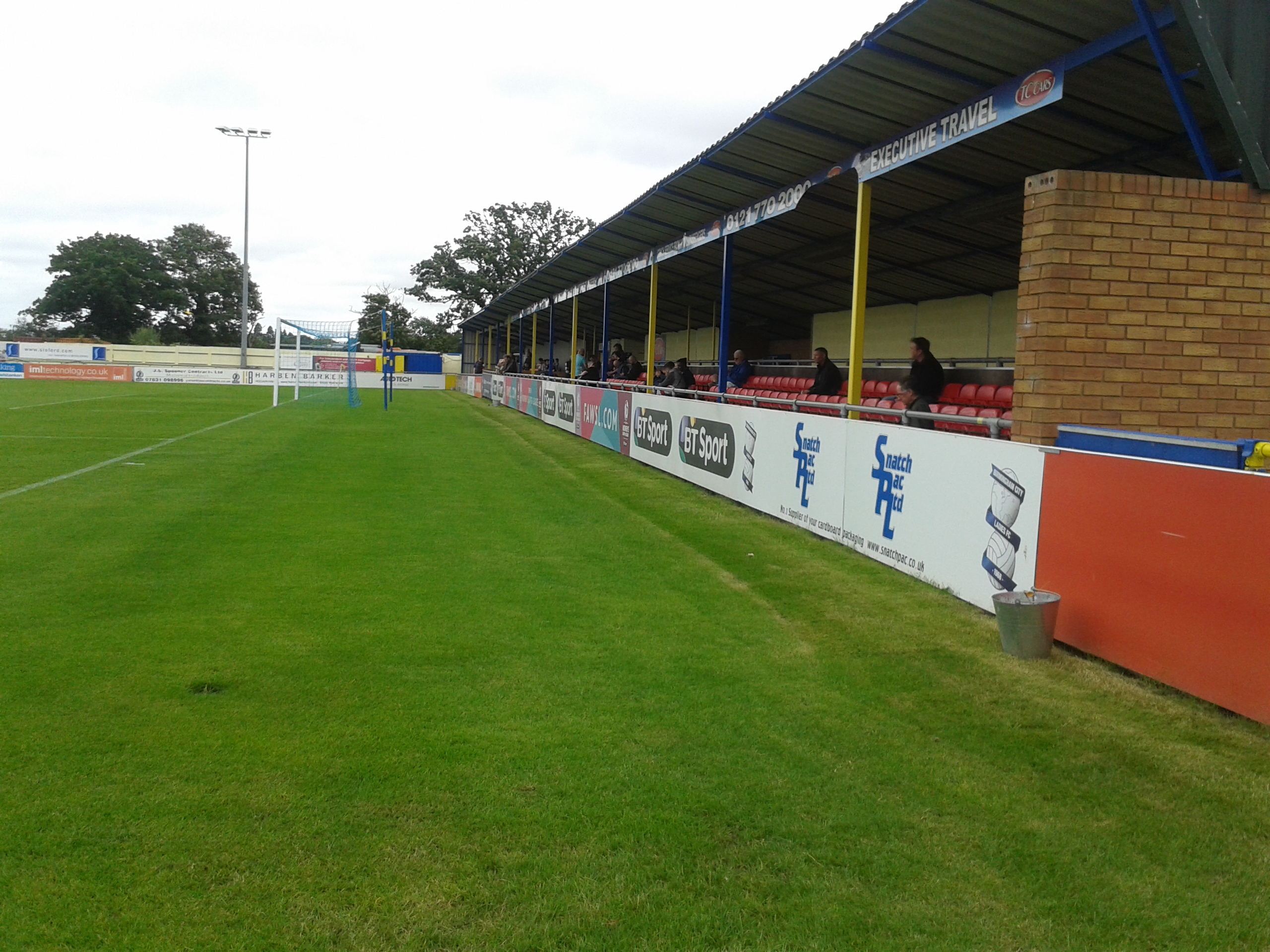
- Damson Park
- Interactive map of Damson Park
- Full name: ARMCO Arena
- Location: Damson Parkway, Solihull, B91 2PP
- Capacity: 5,500

Damson Park (known as the ARMCO Arena for sponsorship reasons) is an association football stadium in Solihull, West Midlands, England. It was the new home of Solihull Borough following their departure from their original Widney Lane Ground. It is now the home of Solihull Moors, the club formed when Solihull Borough and Moor Green merged in 2007. They previously shared Damson Park with Birmingham & Solihull R.F.C. (who moved to Portway in 2012) and also used to have an agreement that allows Birmingham City Reserves the use of the ground for their reserve games. Birmingham City W.F.C. of the FA WSL2 have used Damson Park for home games since 2014.

An earlier sponsorship deal saw Damson Park named the "Autotech Stadium" for three seasons beginning in 2013–14. The capacity of the stadium is 5,500.

== Features ==
The ground has two seated stands on either side of the pitch, and a covered stand of mixed seating and terracing at the southeastern end of the ground, where all six entrances are located. The main stand, situated on the southwestern side, is connected to the clubhouse. The clubhouse contains three separate bar areas, and is also home to a pie & chips shop on matchdays. The stand has seating at the bottom and a balcony above reserved for sponsors and club officials. Adjacent to the main stand is an area of hard standing with a raised toilet block. The steps leading to the entrances to the toilet facilities provide the only small area of terracing at that end of the ground, and are thus popular with a group of Solihull Moors fans calling themselves "The Number 2 Crew" when their side is attacking that end of the pitch.

Turnstiles open into the area next to the main stand (which also hosts the club shop and a hot food concession), the hard standing area on the opposite side of the pitch from the main stand, and into the other large stand. This area, known as 'The Shed' – or sometimes also 'The Tuck Shop End' to supporters, is currently officially titled as 'The TC Cars Stand' for sponsorship reasons. As its name suggests, it is home to the club tuck shop which sells refreshments throughout the match, but not hot food.

Much of the rest of the ground is undeveloped hard standing. Nearest to the turnstiles on the northeast side of the ground, there is a toilet block and sometimes a second hot food stall, depending on segregation requirements and demand. Opposite the main stand there is a single step of terracing that straddles the halfway line of the pitch. Further along this side, in the opposite direction from the T&C Cars Stand, is a smaller area of covered seating that was erected in 2016. The furthest end of the ground from the turnstiles is a terrace with a roof, and runs the whole back end of the pitch. This is used for away fans with large followings, otherwise open to everyone. This stand was brought over from Maidstone United's Gallagher Stadium in 2016–17.

== Seating ==
The clubhouse side of the ground saw major redevelopment, with the previous main stand upgraded and replaced with a two-tier stand. The bottom tier holds around 1300 seats, the top-tier seating the hospitality areas. Opposite 3 separate semi-permanent seating stands hold around an extra 1500 seats, with one often used for visiting supporters in segregated matches. The overall capacity is around 5,500, in line with Football league requirements. The record attendance is 4,020 v Chesterfield on 29 May 2022 in the National League play-off semi-final.

== Midland League final ==
The stadium played host to the Midland Football League Cup final on 10 May 2016, a 3–1 win for Hereford over Walsall Wood.
