= 1995–96 Midland Football Alliance =

Midland Football Alliance
- Season: 1995–96
- Champions: Shepshed Dynamo
- Promoted: Shepshed Dynamo
- Relegated: Bolehall Swifts
- Matches: 342
- Goals: 1,066 (3.12 per match)

The 1995–96 Midland Football Alliance season was the second in the history of Midland Football Alliance, a football competition in England.

== Clubs and league table ==
The league featured 18 clubs from the previous season, along with two new clubs:

- Armitage, relegated from the Southern Football League
- Blakenall, promoted from the West Midlands (Regional) League

=== League table ===
Pos	Team	Pld	W	D	L	GF	GA	GD	Pts	Promotion or relegation
1	Shepshed Dynamo	36	22	10	4	90	37	+53	76	Promoted to the Southern Football League
2	Blakenall	36	19	11	6	60	35	+25	68	
3	Hinckley Athletic	36	21	4	11	78	54	+24	67	
4	Rocester	36	19	9	8	55	50	+5	66	
5	Knypersley Victoria	36	18	8	10	73	43	+30	62	
6	Boldmere St. Michaels	36	18	5	13	73	51	+22	59	
7	Sandwell Borough	36	17	5	14	56	50	+6	56	
8	Willenhall Town	36	16	7	13	52	62	−10	55	
9	Barwell	36	15	6	15	57	53	+4	51	
10	Oldbury United	36	14	8	14	49	41	+8	50	
11	Halesowen Harriers	36	13	7	16	54	62	−8	46	
12	Rushall Olympic	36	15	5	16	56	65	−9	46 (Note: Rushall Olympic deducted 4 points.)	
13	Stratford Town	36	12	9	15	56	54	+2	45	
14	Pershore Town	36	12	9	15	58	73	−15	45	
15	West Midlands Police	36	11	11	14	49	55	−6	44	
16	Chasetown	36	10	10	16	44	52	−8	40	
17	Shifnal Town	36	8	9	19	38	60	−22	33	
18	Stapenhill	36	5	6	25	38	87	−49	21	
19	Bolehall Swifts	36	5	5	26	30	82	−52	20	Relegated to the Midland Football Combination
20	Armitage	0	0	0	0	0	0	0	0	Club folded, record expunged

Source: fchd
Rules for classification: 1) points; 2) goal difference; 3) number of goals scored.
