= Armitage 90 F.C. =

Former English association football club

Armitage '90
- Full name: Armitage '90 Football Club
- Founded: 1915 (originally); 1990 (rebrand)
- Dissolved: June 1981
- Ground: Kings Bromley Lane, Rugeley
- 1995–96: Midland Football Alliance, 20th (record expunged)

Armitage '90 F.C. was an English association football club. They played at Kings Bromley Lane. The club competed variously in the Staffordshire Senior League, Midland Football Combination, Southern League, and Midland Football Alliance between 1990 and 1996, when the club folded. The club also regularly entered the FA Cup, but never made it beyond the qualifying rounds.

The original club, Armitage FC, was formed in 1915 and joined the West Midlands (Regional) League in 1971. In 1987 they left to join the Staffordshire County League due to financial issues. In 1990 there was a rescue package that saw a rebranding to Armitage 90. The club dropped the "90" in time for the 1994–95 season to return to the name Armitage FC, before folding in 1996.
