= Ilkeston Town F.C. (1945) =

Defunct association football club in Ilkeston, England

Ilkeston Town
- Full name: Ilkeston Town
- Founded: 1945
- Dissolved: 2010; 16 years ago
- Ground: Manor Ground (1945–1991); New Manor Ground (1991–2010)
- 2009–10 (last full season): Football Conference North, 8th
Home colours

Ilkeston Town F.C. was an English football club based in Ilkeston.

== History ==
The club was formed in 1945 following the demise of clubs like Ilkeston United and a previous Ilkeston Town.

At first the club competed in local football, not joining the senior Midland League until 1961. They became Midland League champions in 1968 and spent two years in the Southern Football League in the early 1970s.

When the Midland League merged with the Yorkshire Football League to form the Northern Counties East League in 1982, Ilkeston became founder members of the new competition and entered the Premier Division. After finishing bottom of the league in 1986, they joined the Central Midlands League.

In 1990 they joined the West Midlands (Regional) League, and four years later they became champions, securing promotion back to the Southern League.

When the non-league pyramid was restructured in 2004, Town were placed in the Northern Premier League First Division, winning promotion to the Premier Division at the first attempt. Paul Hurst and former Rotherham United teammate Rob Scott were appointed joint managers of the Northern Premier League outfit in January 2009 following the departure of David Holdsworth to Mansfield Town. In May 2009 they won the league's play-off final to secure a place in the Conference North.

They finished 8th in their first season in the Conference North, but part way through their second season the club was liquidated due to an unpaid tax bill of £50,000.

A new club, Ilkeston F.C., was formed in its place.

== Colours ==
The club originally wore old gold shirts and black shorts.

== Honours ==
=== League ===
- Northern Premier League Premier Division
  - Promoted: 2008–09
- Northern Premier League Division 1
  - Promoted: 2004–05
- Southern League Midland Division
  - Promoted: 1994–95, 1997–98
- Midland League
  - Champions: 1967–68
- West Midlands (Regional) League Premier Division
  - Promoted: 1993–94 (champions)
- West Midlands (Regional) League Division 1
  - Promoted: 1991–92 (as champions)

=== Cup ===
- Derbyshire Senior Cup
  - Winners: 1949, 1953, 1956, 1958, 1963, 1983, 1993, 1999, 2000, 2006, 2007

== Records ==
- Best FA Cup performance: 2nd Round, 1997–98, 1999-00
- Best FA Trophy performance: 3rd Round, Four occasions
- Best FA Vase performance: 4th Round, 1988–89
