= Bashley F.C. =

Association football club in England

Coordinates: 50°46′22.670″N 1°39′24.829″W

- Nickname: The Bash
- Founded: 1947
- Ground: Bashley Road, Bashley
- Capacity: 4,250 (250 seated)
- Chairman: Liam Bailey
- Manager: Wayne Crutcher
- League: Wessex League Premier Division
- 2025–26: Southern League Division One South, 20th of 22 (relegated)
- Website: https://www.bashley-fc.com
| Home colours | Away colours |

Bashley Football Club is a football club based in Bashley, near New Milton, Hampshire, England. They are currently members of the Wessex League Premier Division and play at Bashley Road.

== History ==
The club was established in 1947. They joined the Bournemouth League in 1950, where the club remained until moving up to Division Three of the Hampshire League in 1983. The club were Division Three champions in 1984–85, earning promotion to Division Two. When the Wessex League was formed in 1986, Bashley were founder members and its inaugural champions in 1986–87. The club won the league again the following season, also reaching the semi-finals of the FA Vase, where they lost 2–1 on aggregate to Emley, with the attendance of 3,500 for the home leg remaining a club record. After a third successive Wessex League title in 1988–89, they were promoted to the South Division of the Southern League.

Bashley's first season in the Southern League saw them win the South Division, earning promotion to the Premier Division. They were later relegated back to the South Division at the end of the 1993–94 season. In 1994–95 the club reached the first round of the FA Cup for the first time; after beating Chesham United 1–0 in the first round, they went on to lose 1–0 at home to Swansea City in the second round. In 1999 the Southern Division was renamed the Eastern Division, and in 2004 the club were transferred to Division One of the Isthmian League.

After two season in the Isthmian League, Bashley were moved to Division One South & West of the Southern League. The club won the division at the first attempt, earning promotion to the Premier Division. The following season saw them finish fifth in the Premier Division, qualifying for the promotion play-offs; however, they lost 4–1 to eventual winners Team Bath in the semi-finals. In 2013–14 they finished bottom of the Premier Division and were relegated back to Division One South & West. Despite finishing bottom of the division the following season, the club avoided relegation. However, they finished bottom of the division again in 2015–16, failing to win a league game all season, and were relegated to the Premier Division of the Wessex League.

In 2021–22 Bashley were runners-up in the Premier Division, earning promotion to Division One South of the Southern League as one of the best ten runners-up in step five leagues.

== Honours ==
- Southern League
  - Division One South & West champions 2006–07
  - Southern Division champions 1989–90
- Wessex League
  - Champions 1986–87, 1987–88, 1988–89
- Hampshire League
  - Division Three champions 1984–85
- Russell Cotes Cup
  - Winners 1985–86, 1990–91, 1992–93

== Records ==
- Best FA Cup performance: Second round, 1994–95
- Best FA Trophy performance: Fourth round, 2001–02
- Best FA Vase performance: Semi-finals, 1987–88
- Record attendance: 3,500 vs Emley, FA Vase semi-final 1988
- Biggest win: 21–1 vs Cooperative, Bournemouth League, 1964
- Heaviest defeat: 20–2 vs Air Speed, Bournemouth League, 1957
- Most appearances: John Bone, 829
- Most goals: Richard Gillespie, 180
- Record transfer fee paid: £7,500 to Newport (IOW) for Danny Gibbons; £7,500 to Dorchester Town for David Elm
- Record transfer fee received: £15,000 from Salisbury City for Craig Davis; £15,000 from Eastleigh for Paul Sales; £15,000 from AFC Bournemouth for Wade Elliott

== See also ==
- Bashley F.C. players
- Bashley F.C. managers
