= Moor Green F.C. =

Coordinates: 52.430038°N 1.8464584°W

Moor Green
- Full name: Moor Green Football Club
- Nickname: The Moors
- Founded: 1901
- Dissolved: 2007 (upon merger)
- Ground: The Moorlands
- Capacity: 3,250 (250 seated)
- 2006–07: Conference North, 11th
Home colours	Away colours

Moor Green F.C. was a non-league association football team originally from the Hall Green area of south Birmingham but later based in the borough of Solihull, West Midlands, England. In 2007 the club merged with Solihull Borough to form a new club, Solihull Moors.

== History ==
Moor Green FC was formed in 1901 by players from the Moseley Ashfield Cricket Club but did not play competitive football until 1922 when they joined the Birmingham AFA. In 1935–36 they were league champions and joined the Central Amateur League and were league champions in each of the three seasons they played in the league.

After World War II the Moors joined the Birmingham Combination, followed by a switch to the Birmingham & District League (soon to be renamed the West Midlands (Regional) League) in 1954. They struggled in this league, however, and in 1965 stepped down to the Worcestershire Combination (soon to be renamed the Midland Football Combination), which was at the time considered a weaker league. The club finished as league runners-up on four occasions and won the championship in 1980–81. This success was rewarded with a step up to the Southern League in 1983.

In 1987–88 the Moors finished second in the Southern League Midland Division and were promoted to the Premier Division, where they spent six seasons before succumbing to relegation. In 1999–2000, however, they were promoted back to the Premier Division and a 13th-place finish in 2003–04 was enough to secure a place in the newly formed Conference North.

The club played at "The Moorlands" (a 3,250 capacity stadium with 250 seats) from 1930 until 2005, when it was severely damaged and rendered unusable due to an arson attack. During the last two years of the club's existence they played at Damson Park in Solihull, the home of local rivals Solihull Borough. In January 2007, following a period of deliberation, it was determined by directors at the club that to rebuild The Moorlands or develop a new ground would be financially unviable, and that if the club were to continue it would have to merge with another local team. After holding discussions with three clubs it was announced that Moor Green had applied to the FA for permission to merge with Solihull Borough. The merger was confirmed on 30 March 2007 when it was revealed that a new club under the name Solihull Moors would be formed on 1 June and would take Moor Green's place in the Conference North. Moor Green boss Bob Faulkner was later confirmed as the new club's football manager. Despite rumours that the fans of Moor Green had decided to re-establish the original club; no new club under the name "Moor Green" has been founded to date, and the club's stadium was later purchased by Brooke Smith Planning in September 2011 and subsequently demolished to make way for new homes; thus making re-establishment unlikely.

== Club records ==
- Best league performance: 9th in Conference North, 2005–06
- Best FA Cup performance: 1st round, 1979–80 and 2002–03
- Best FA Trophy performance: 4th round, 1999–2000
- Best FA Amateur Cup performance: Quarter-finals, 1945–46, 1947–48

== Sources ==
- Moor Green at the Football Club History Database
