= Rugby Town F.C. =

English football club

Coordinates: 52°22′23.41″N 1°14′06.08″W

Rugby Town FC
- Full name: Rugby Town Football Club
- Nickname: The Valley
- Founded: 1956
- Ground: Butlin Road, Rugby, Warwickshire
- Capacity: 5,000 (aprox)
- Chairman: Brian Melvin
- Manager: Grant Joshua
- League: United Counties League Premier Division South
- 2025–26: Northern Premier League Division One Midlands, 22nd of 22 (relegated)
| Home colours | Away colours |

Rugby Town Football Club is a football club based in Rugby, Warwickshire, which plays in the United Counties League Premier Division South. It is nicknamed The Valley, and plays its home matches at Butlin Road. It was originally named New Bilton Juniors and renamed four times. First, in 1956, to Valley Sports. The next time was in 1971 to Valley Sports Rugby, or simply VS Rugby, then in 2000 to Rugby United, and again for the most recent time to Rugby Town F.C. in 2005.

== History ==
Formed by Keith Coughlan and under the name of New Bilton Juniors, the Valley played its first friendly match in 1956.

In 1956, the club was renamed for the first time, to Valley Sports and entered the Rugby and District Football League. The club progressed to the Coventry and North Warwickshire Football League in 1963, and to the United Counties League in 1969 changing the name to VS Rugby.

The club initially played at Thornfield and then briefly at Hillmorton Recreation ground when Thornfield was taken over for the sports centre before groundsharing with the then Southern Football League side Rugby Town at Oakfield. VS Rugby moved into their own ground, Butlin Road, in 1973 the first competitive game there being a 0–0 draw against Burton Park Wanderers in the United Counties League. In 1975 the club was invited to join the West Midlands League, and took part in the FA Cup for the first time in 1976, being knocked out in the first qualifying round.

In 1981, the Valley's most successful manager, Jimmy Knox, took over. He had previously successfully managed the then Rugby Town (for whom he had also made 452 appearances) and AP Leamington. Knox turned around the club's fortunes dramatically and in 1983 they won The FA Vase, defeating Halesowen Town 1–0.

For the 1983/84 season the club joined the Southern League where success continued with the club winning The Midland Division in 1986/87, The Southern League Cup in 1989/90 and The Birmingham Senior Cup in 1988/89 and 1991/92.

During Jimmy Knox's 11 years at Butlin Road the Valley had much success in the FA Cup, their best being a run to the second round in 1987/88 being knocked out by Bristol Rovers after a drawn game at Butlin Road. They also had memorable cup ties against Northampton Town, Bristol City, and Leyton Orient.

In August 1991, VS Rugby played and beat a strong Manchester United side 1–0 at Butlin Road in a testimonial match to recognise Knox's ten years at the club. United manager Alex Ferguson honoured a verbal agreement made through Knox's brother Archie, who was United's Assistant Manager.

Once Knox left the club in 1992 its fortunes started to decline and despite reaching the second round of The FA Cup again in the 1992/93 season they were relegated and the then chairman put the club into receivership. A group of supporters that included founder Keith Coughlan, however, rescued the club, and manager Ron Bradbury stayed on to gain promotion behind newly formed Rushden & Diamonds in 1994. The same season the club also again reached the first round of The FA Cup losing at home to Brentford.

VS Rugby changed its name to Rugby United in 2000, and to Rugby Town in 2005. In both cases there was a degree of controversy amongst the supporter base.

Valley came close to promotion twice under manager Dave Stringer in the 2012–13 and 2013–14 seasons. In 2012–13 they missed out on the title on the final day before losing to Biggleswade Town in the play-off final at Butlin Road. The following season saw Valley once again in contention for the title on the final day only to fail to secure top spot. Promotion hopes once again ended in the play-offs after a defeat to Slough Town over two legs in the semi-final. The 2014/15 season was less successful for Valley with the club failing to make the play-offs after an inconsistent season. At the end of the campaign, Rugby Town parted company with manager Dave Stringer.

For the first time in the club's history, Rugby Town were moved into the Northern Premier League system for the 2015–16 season. Stringer's replacement, former Rushden & Diamonds midfielder Gary Mills, tendered his resignation early into the season after a poor start and was replaced by ex-Tamworth boss Dale Belford. Rugby recovered and finished the season in ninth place before Belford left the club by mutual consent.

At the start of the 2016/17 season James Jepson was appointed manager but lasted but a few weeks being replaced by former player Gary Moran in September 2016. Moran could not guide Rugby away from the relegation zone and they were condemned to relegation to the Midland Football League on the final day of the season with Moran resigning shortly afterwards.

Former manager Dave Stringer returned to the role of manager in May 2017 after leaving Chasetown.

Rugby Town parted company with manager Dave Stringer in May 2018 and he was subsequently replaced in the same month by Stratford Town F.C. manager Carl Adams.

In the 2021–22 season, Rugby Town achieved their most impressive FA Vase run since they won the competition in 1983. They went out in the last sixteen stage at North Shields FC, one of the longest away visits in the club's history.

During 2022–23, Rugby Town led the UCL Premier Division South for much of the season. A poor run of form towards the end of it cost them the league title, but as it eventuated they still attained promotion via being one of the best second-placed teams in the step. They are set to play in the Northern Premier League Midland Division in the 2023–24 season.

== Ground ==
Butlin Road
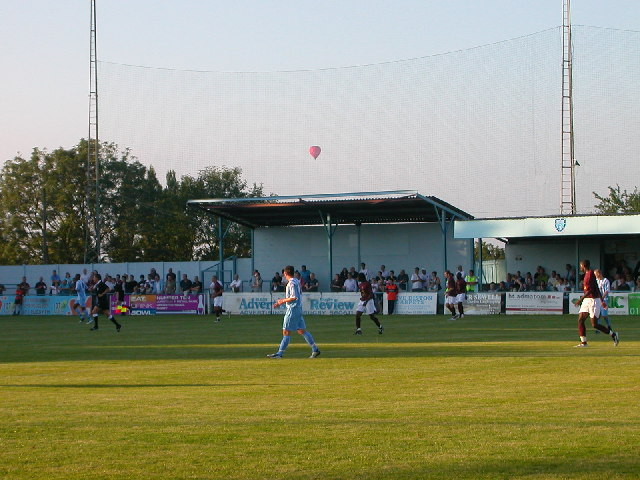
- The club has played at Butlin Road since 1973.
- Location: Butlin Road, Rugby, Warwickshire
- Owner: Rugby Town F.C.
- Operator: Rugby Town F.C.
- Capacity: 6,000 [unconfirmed] (740 seated)
- Surface: Grass
- Record attendance: 3,961 (Rugby Town vs. Northampton Town, 1984)

Construction
- Opened: October 1973

Tenant
- Rugby Town F.C. (1973–)

The ground, unlike many in non-league circles, has covering on all four sides of the ground and seating on two sides.

The official capacity was confirmed as 5,375 in 2005 but this is set to increase with the new 1,300 covered terrace at the allotment end as well as further terracing developments throughout the stadium.

Now, approximately 2,800 spectators are able to be accommodated under cover and 740 of these can also be seated. The main stand, which holds 500 fans and also includes the dressing rooms. Helped by a Football Foundation & Stadia Improvement Fund Grant, the stand was open for use in early 2003, but it was not officially opened until August 2003, when ex-England International Darius Vassell did the honours as Rugby played an Aston Villa XI.

The 2003–04 season saw the introduction of new dugouts at Butlin Road. The ex-Filbert Street structures have a strip of Astroturf laid in front of the dugout area to stop wear and tear.

== Past players ==
Since entry to Southern Football League in 1983–84

=== Record appearances ===
in order of most appearances Correct to May 2022

- 458: David Kolodynski, 2006–10, 2012–14, 2015-18 & 2020–22
- 390: Danny Conway, 1983–1990
- 345: Justin Marsden, 2001–05, 2013-15 & 2018–22
- 290: Craig Herbert, 2000–09
- 286: Tom McGinty, 1989–95

=== Record goalscorers ===
in order of most goals Correct at May 2022

- 251: David Kolodynski, 2006–10, 2012–14, 2015–18, 2020–22
- 124: Danny Conway, 1983–90
- 85: Ian Crawley, 1983–85, 1987 & 1991–94
- 84: Robbie Beard, 2000–06
- 77: Ashley Warner, 1992–94 & 1998–2000

== Managers ==
Since entry to Southern Football League in 1983–84

- 1981–1992: Jimmy Knox
- 1992–1993: Mick Martin
- 1993–1995: Ron Bradbury
- 1995–1996: Stuart Robson
- 1996: David Jones & Steve Hunt
- 1996–1998: Alan Lewer
- 1998–2001: Martin Sockett
- 2001–2005: Tony Dobson
- 2005–2007: Billy Jeffrey
- 2008: Rod Brown
- 2008–2009: Tony Dobson
- 2009–2010: Lee Colkin
- 2010–2011: Martin Sockett
- 2011–2015: Dave Stringer
- 2015: Gary Mills
- 2015–2016: Dale Belford
- 2016: James Jepson
- 2016–2017: Gary Moran
- 2017-2018: Dave Stringer
- 2018–2024: Carl Adams
- 2024- 2024: Ian King
- 2025- Present: Grant Joshua

== Honours ==
- Southern League Division One Midlands:
  - Winners (1): 1986–87
  - Runners-up (3): 1993–94, 2012–13 & 2013–14
- Southern League Cup:
  - Winners (1): 1989–90
- FA Vase:
  - Winners (1): 1982–83
- Birmingham Senior Cup:
  - Winners (2): 1988–89 & 1991–92
  - Runners-up (1): 1992–93
- Midland Floodlit Cup:
  - Winners (3): 1984–85, 1989–90 & 1998–99
  - Runners-up(1): 1987–88

== Records ==
Since entry to Southern Football League in 1983–84

- League victory: 12-0 v Desborough Town in 2019-20 (United Counties League Premier Division)
- League defeat: 1–11 v Ilkeston Town in 1997–98
- Games without defeat: 16 in 1988–89 & 1993–94
- Games without victory: 19 in 1995–96
- Consecutive wins: 12 in 2012–13
- Consecutive defeats: 8 in 1995–96

=== Best performances ===
- Best League performance: 3rd in Southern League Premier Division, 1988–89 & 1991–92
- Best FA Cup performance: 2nd Round, 1987–88 & 1992–93
- Best FA Trophy performance: 3rd Round, 1999–2000 & 2002–03
- Best FA Vase performance: Winners, 1982–83
