= Solihull Borough F.C. =

Solihull Borough
- Full name: Solihull Borough Football Club
- Nickname(s): The Boro
- Founded: 1953 (as Lincoln)
- Dissolved: 2007 (upon merger)
- Ground: Damson Park, Solihull
- Capacity: 3,050 (280 seated)
- 2005–06: Southern League; Western Division, 12th
Home colours	Away colours

Solihull Borough F.C. was an English football club from Solihull. In 2007 the club merged with Moor Green to form a new club, Solihull Moors.

== History ==
Solihull Borough FC was founded in 1953 by Joe McGorian. They originally played at Widney Lane in Solihull under the name of Lincoln FC. After changing their name to Solihull Borough, they joined the Midland Football Combination Division Two in 1969. In 1971, they were promoted to Division One, which was later renamed the Premier Division. They were runners-up in 1984–85 and again in 1990–91, after which they stepped up to the Southern League, where they were Midland division champions at the first attempt.

In 1989, financial problems had forced the club to sell their Widney Lane Ground to property developers and eventually agreed a ground share with their local rivals, Moor Green. In 1993, Solihull managed to get to the first round of the FA Cup, but lost out to fellow non-leaguers VS Rugby, a feat repeated in 1997–98 when they lost to Darlington on penalties.

In 1995, Solihull won the Birmingham Senior Cup for the first time, but were relegated back to the Southern League Midland Division.

In 1998, Solihull moved to the home ground of Redditch United, before they finally found their own home ground, with the purchase of the Damson Parkway site, a former golf driving range, where the Damson Park stadium was built.

Despite finishing only 7th in the table, the Boro were promoted to the Southern League Premier Division, but finished bottom of the table and were relegated. After one season in the Western Division, the club were placed in the new Division One Midlands.

Following an arson attack at Moor Green's stadium in 2005, from then onwards, Solihull and Moor Green once again shared a ground. In January 2007 the two clubs applied to the Football Association to formally merge. The merger was confirmed on 30 March 2007 when it was revealed that a new club under the name Solihull Moors would be formed on 1 June and would take Moor Green's place in the Conference North. Moor Green boss Bob Faulkner was later confirmed as the new club's football manager.

== Club records ==
- Best league performance: 6th in Southern League Premier Division, 1992–93
- Best FA Cup performance: 1st round, 1992–93, 1997–98
- Best FA Trophy performance: 4th round, 2001–02
- Best FA Vase performance: 5th round, 1974–75
- Record Victory: 11–0 v Tamworth, 1940

== Sources ==
- Solihull Borough at the Football Club History Database
