= Hinckley Town F.C. =

Hinckley Town
- Full name: Hinckley Town Football Club
- Founded: 19th century
- Dissolved: 1997 (merged with Hinckley Athletic to form Hinckley United)

Hinckley Town F.C. was an English association football club based in Hinckley, England.

== History ==
The club was the first from the town of Hinckley, being formed in the 19th century, by young sportsmen expelled from the Christ Church Club for going ice skating on a Sunday; it was originally known as Hinckley Association but added the Town epithet in 1890. They played in the Leicestershire Senior League and Midland League before dissolving in 1906.

The club was re-formed in 1972 and subsequently played in the FA Cup, FA Trophy and FA Vase.

In 1997 they merged with Hinckley Athletic to form Hinckley United.

== Colours ==
The club originally wore blue and black jerseys with white knickers. It adopted red and blue halved shirts (described as "quarters") in 1892.

== Ground ==
The club's first ground was known as the Well or Holywell Ground, as the Holy Well was off one corner of the field.
