= 2008–09 Sussex County Football League =

The 2008–09 Sussex County Football League season was the 84th in the history of Sussex County Football League a football competition in England.

== Division One ==
Sussex County Football League Division One
- Season: 2008–09
- Champions: Eastbourne United Association
- Promoted: Horsham YMCA
- Relegated: East Preston; Oakwood; Worthing United
- Matches: 380
- Goals: 1,285 (3.38 per match)

Division One featured 17 clubs which competed in the division last season, along with three new clubs:

- East Grinstead Town, promoted from Division Two
- Horsham YMCA, relegated from the Isthmian League
- Lingfield, promoted from Division Two

=== League table ===
| Pos | Team | Pld | W | D | L | GF | GA | GD | Pts | Qualification or relegation |
|---|---|---|---|---|---|---|---|---|---|---|
| 1 | Eastbourne United Association | 38 | 23 | 6 | 9 | 79 | 37 | +42 | 75 | |
| 2 | Arundel | 38 | 21 | 10 | 7 | 96 | 53 | +43 | 73 | |
| 3 | Horsham YMCA | 38 | 23 | 4 | 11 | 72 | 53 | +19 | 73 | Promoted to the Isthmian League Division One South |
| 4 | Wick | 38 | 21 | 8 | 9 | 77 | 60 | +17 | 71 | |
| 5 | Three Bridges | 38 | 20 | 7 | 11 | 75 | 51 | +24 | 67 | |
| 6 | Shoreham | 38 | 18 | 11 | 9 | 63 | 45 | +18 | 65 | |
| 7 | Redhill | 38 | 16 | 13 | 9 | 70 | 43 | +27 | 61 | |
| 8 | Lingfield | 38 | 14 | 15 | 9 | 62 | 51 | +11 | 57 | |
| 9 | Selsey | 38 | 14 | 9 | 15 | 59 | 48 | +11 | 51 | |
| 10 | Pagham | 38 | 13 | 9 | 16 | 51 | 59 | −8 | 48 | |
| 11 | St Francis Rangers | 38 | 13 | 8 | 17 | 64 | 65 | −1 | 47 | |
| 12 | Whitehawk | 38 | 13 | 8 | 17 | 62 | 64 | −2 | 47 | |
| 13 | Chichester City United | 38 | 19 | 5 | 14 | 74 | 70 | +4 | 43 (Note: Chichester City United were deducted 19 points.) | |
| 14 | Hailsham Town | 38 | 12 | 7 | 19 | 54 | 92 | −38 | 43 | |
| 15 | Ringmer | 38 | 19 | 5 | 14 | 86 | 60 | +26 | 42 (Note: Ringmer were deducted 20 points.) | |
| 16 | Hassocks | 38 | 10 | 10 | 18 | 49 | 61 | −12 | 40 | |
| 17 | East Grinstead Town | 38 | 8 | 9 | 21 | 54 | 84 | −30 | 33 | |
| 18 | East Preston | 38 | 9 | 5 | 24 | 53 | 85 | −32 | 32 | Relegated to Division Two |
| 19 | Oakwood | 38 | 8 | 5 | 25 | 43 | 97 | −54 | 29 | Relegated to Division Two |
| 20 | Worthing United | 38 | 4 | 10 | 24 | 42 | 107 | −65 | 22 | Relegated to Division Two |

Source: nonleaguematters
Rules for classification: 1) points; 2) goal difference; 3) number of goals scored.

== Division Two ==
Sussex County Football League Division Two
- Season: 2008–09
- Champions: Peacehaven & Telscombe
- Promoted: Peacehaven & Telscombe; Mile Oak; Crawley Down
- Relegated: Bexhill United; Sidlesham
- Matches: 306
- Goals: 1,054 (3.44 per match)

Division Two featured 14 clubs which competed in the division last season, along with four new clubs.

- Clubs relegated from Division One:
  - Rye United
  - Sidley United
- Clubs promoted from Division Three:
  - Bexhill United
  - Loxwood

=== League table ===
| Pos | Team | Pld | W | D | L | GF | GA | GD | Pts | Qualification or relegation |
|---|---|---|---|---|---|---|---|---|---|---|
| 1 | Peacehaven & Telscombe | 34 | 25 | 5 | 4 | 104 | 31 | +73 | 80 | Promoted to Division One |
| 2 | Mile Oak | 34 | 24 | 3 | 7 | 92 | 35 | +57 | 75 | Promoted to Division One |
| 3 | Crawley Down | 34 | 19 | 10 | 5 | 77 | 33 | +44 | 67 | Promoted to Division One |
| 4 | Rustington | 34 | 20 | 4 | 10 | 66 | 39 | +27 | 64 | |
| 5 | Westfield | 34 | 17 | 8 | 9 | 57 | 46 | +11 | 59 | |
| 6 | Rye United | 34 | 16 | 8 | 10 | 66 | 45 | +21 | 56 | |
| 7 | Seaford Town | 34 | 16 | 5 | 13 | 61 | 56 | +5 | 56 (Note: Seaford Town were awarded three points.) | |
| 8 | Sidley United | 34 | 12 | 9 | 13 | 49 | 57 | −8 | 45 | |
| 9 | Lancing | 34 | 12 | 6 | 16 | 55 | 65 | −10 | 42 | |
| 10 | Loxwood | 34 | 11 | 8 | 15 | 44 | 49 | −5 | 41 | |
| 11 | Southwick | 34 | 12 | 5 | 17 | 58 | 71 | −13 | 41 | |
| 12 | Storrington | 34 | 12 | 5 | 17 | 43 | 58 | −15 | 41 | |
| 13 | Steyning Town | 34 | 12 | 6 | 16 | 42 | 67 | −25 | 39 (Note: Steyning Town were deducted three points.) | |
| 14 | Littlehampton Town | 34 | 9 | 10 | 15 | 65 | 82 | −17 | 37 | |
| 15 | Wealden | 34 | 10 | 6 | 18 | 57 | 69 | −12 | 36 | |
| 16 | Midhurst & Easebourne | 34 | 9 | 6 | 19 | 46 | 74 | −28 | 33 | |
| 17 | Bexhill United | 34 | 8 | 6 | 20 | 45 | 67 | −22 | 30 | Relegated to Division Three |
| 18 | Sidlesham | 34 | 3 | 8 | 23 | 27 | 110 | −83 | 17 | Relegated to Division Three |

Source: nonleaguematters
Rules for classification: 1) points; 2) goal difference; 3) number of goals scored.

== Division Three ==
Sussex County Football League Division Three
- Season: 2008–09
- Champions: Clymping
- Promoted: Clymping; Little Common
- Matches: 182
- Goals: 657 (3.61 per match)

Division Three featured eleven clubs which competed in the division last season, along with three new clubs:

- Broadbridge Heath, relegated from Division Two
- Clymping, joined from the West Sussex League
- Pease Pottage Village, relegated from Division Two

=== League table ===
| Pos | Team | Pld | W | D | L | GF | GA | GD | Pts | Qualification or relegation |
|---|---|---|---|---|---|---|---|---|---|---|
| 1 | Clymping | 26 | 19 | 3 | 4 | 70 | 29 | +41 | 60 | Promoted to Division Two |
| 2 | Little Common | 26 | 18 | 3 | 5 | 66 | 37 | +29 | 57 | Promoted to Division Two |
| 3 | Haywards Heath Town | 26 | 17 | 4 | 5 | 57 | 20 | +37 | 55 | |
| 4 | Newhaven | 26 | 15 | 6 | 5 | 64 | 40 | +24 | 51 | |
| 5 | Dorking Wanderers | 26 | 15 | 2 | 9 | 70 | 45 | +25 | 47 | |
| 6 | Forest | 26 | 11 | 7 | 8 | 40 | 33 | +7 | 40 | |
| 7 | Saltdean United | 26 | 10 | 6 | 10 | 32 | 42 | −10 | 36 | |
| 8 | Uckfield Town | 26 | 10 | 4 | 12 | 47 | 48 | −1 | 34 | |
| 9 | Broadbridge Heath | 26 | 8 | 3 | 15 | 41 | 57 | −16 | 27 | |
| 10 | Bosham | 26 | 7 | 5 | 14 | 35 | 53 | −18 | 26 | |
| 11 | Rottingdean Village | 26 | 5 | 10 | 11 | 31 | 48 | −17 | 25 | |
| 12 | Ifield Edwards | 26 | 6 | 6 | 14 | 39 | 54 | −15 | 24 | |
| 13 | Hurstpierpoint | 26 | 4 | 4 | 18 | 35 | 75 | −40 | 16 | |
| 14 | Pease Pottage Village | 26 | 4 | 3 | 19 | 30 | 76 | −46 | 15 | |

Source: nonleaguematters
Rules for classification: 1) points; 2) goal difference; 3) number of goals scored.
