= 2009–10 Sussex County Football League =

The 2009–10 Sussex County Football League season was the 85th in the history of Sussex County Football League a football competition in England.

== Division One ==
Sussex County Football League Division One
- Season: 2009–10
- Champions: Whitehawk
- Promoted: Whitehawk
- Relegated: Mile Oak
- Matches: 380
- Goals: 1,314 (3.46 per match)

Division One featured 16 clubs which competed in the division last season, along with four new clubs.

- Clubs promoted from Division Two:
  - Crawley Down
  - Mile Oak
  - Peacehaven & Telscombe
- Plus:
  - Crowborough Athletic, relegated from the Isthmian League

Also, Chichester City United changed name to Chichester City.

=== League table ===
Pos	Team	Pld	W	D	L	GF	GA	GD	Pts	Qualification or relegation
1	Whitehawk	38	26	7	5	85	36	+49	85	Promoted to the Isthmian League Division One South
2	Peacehaven & Telscombe	38	23	9	6	83	42	+41	78	
3	Chichester City	38	21	6	11	87	51	+36	69	
4	Wick	38	19	10	9	80	58	+22	67	
5	Redhill	38	18	11	9	65	49	+16	65	
6	Eastbourne United Association	38	16	9	13	70	63	+7	57	
7	Three Bridges	38	16	7	15	78	56	+22	55	
8	Crawley Down	38	14	12	12	71	76	−5	54	
9	Shoreham	38	15	8	15	63	59	+4	53	
10	Lingfield	38	12	16	10	69	67	+2	52	
11	Selsey	38	13	12	13	70	70	0	51	
12	Arundel	38	12	13	13	74	71	+3	49	
13	Ringmer	38	12	14	12	68	71	−3	49 (Note: Ringmer were deducted one point.)	
14	Hassocks	38	12	12	14	51	59	−8	48	
15	East Grinstead Town	38	11	7	20	62	74	−12	40	
16	St Francis Rangers	38	11	7	20	55	76	−21	40	
17	Pagham	38	10	10	18	46	76	−30	40	
18	Crowborough Athletic	38	11	4	23	51	101	−50	37	
19	Hailsham Town	38	9	4	25	50	78	−28	31	
20	Mile Oak	38	6	8	24	36	81	−45	26	Relegated to Division Two

Source: fchd
Rules for classification: 1) points; 2) goal difference; 3) number of goals scored.

== Division Two ==
Sussex County Football League Division Two
- Season: 2009–10
- Champions: Rye United
- Promoted: Rye United; Sidley United
- Relegated: Clymping
- Matches: 306
- Goals: 1,109 (3.62 per match)

Division Two featured 13 clubs which competed in the division last season, along with five new clubs.

- Clubs relegated from Division One:
  - East Preston
  - Oakwood
  - Worthing United
- Clubs promoted from Division Three:
  - Clymping
  - Little Common

=== League table ===
Pos	Team	Pld	W	D	L	GF	GA	GD	Pts	Qualification or relegation
1	Rye United	34	25	1	8	89	41	+48	76	Promoted to Division One
2	Worthing United	34	22	8	4	73	26	+47	74	
3	Sidley United	34	22	7	5	80	35	+45	73	Promoted to Division One
4	Little Common	34	22	5	7	88	49	+39	71	
5	Loxwood	34	18	7	9	74	37	+37	61	
6	Clymping	34	16	8	10	77	50	+27	56	
7	Storrington	34	17	1	16	55	65	−10	52	
8	Wealden	34	15	5	14	56	56	0	50	
9	Oakwood	34	15	4	15	65	68	−3	46 (Note: Oakwood were deducted three points.)	
10	Seaford Town	34	14	4	16	61	65	−4	46	
11	Lancing	34	14	3	17	61	82	−21	45	
12	Littlehampton Town	34	12	7	15	61	60	+1	43	
13	Rustington	34	11	9	14	53	64	−11	42	
14	East Preston	34	12	5	17	55	69	−14	41	
15	Westfield	34	11	4	19	46	69	−23	37	
16	Southwick	34	5	7	22	48	72	−24	22	
17	Steyning Town	34	4	7	23	36	86	−50	19	
18	Midhurst & Easebourne	34	4	2	28	31	115	−84	14	

Source: fchd
Rules for classification: 1) points; 2) goal difference; 3) number of goals scored.

== Division Three ==
Sussex County Football League Division Three
- Season: 2009–10
- Champions: Bosham
- Promoted: Bexhill United
- Matches: 210
- Goals: 765 (3.64 per match)

Division Three featured twelve clubs which competed in the division last season, along with three new clubs:

- Bexhill United, relegated from Division Two
- Sidlesham, relegated from Division Two
- T D Shipley, joined from the West Sussex League

=== League table ===
Pos	Team	Pld	W	D	L	GF	GA	GD	Pts	Qualification or relegation
1	Bosham	28	20	4	4	64	25	+39	64	
2	Bexhill United	28	19	4	5	69	31	+38	61	Promoted to Division Two
3	Haywards Heath Town	28	19	2	7	79	36	+43	59	
4	Dorking Wanderers	28	15	6	7	78	44	+34	51	
5	Ifield Edwards	28	14	5	9	61	43	+18	47	
6	Uckfield Town	28	13	6	9	48	36	+12	45	
7	T D Shipley	28	14	3	11	57	54	+3	45	
8	Saltdean United	28	13	4	11	39	47	−8	43	
9	Newhaven	28	11	3	14	55	50	+5	36	
10	Rottingdean Village	28	10	4	14	44	56	−12	34	
11	Sidlesham	28	10	3	15	38	54	−16	33	
12	Forest	28	8	2	18	38	74	−36	26	
13	Pease Pottage Village	28	7	2	19	30	74	−44	23	
14	Broadbridge Heath	28	6	3	19	31	63	−32	21	
15	Hurstpierpoint	28	3	5	20	34	78	−44	14	

Source: fchd
Rules for classification: 1) points; 2) goal difference; 3) number of goals scored.
