= 2010–11 Sussex County Football League =

The 2010–11 Sussex County Football League season was the 86th in the history of Sussex County Football League a football competition in England.

== Division One ==
Sussex County Football League Division One
- Season: 2010–11
- Champions: Crawley Down
- Promoted: Crawley Down
- Relegated: Eastbourne United Association
- Matches: 380
- Goals: 1,296 (3.41 per match)

Division One featured 18 clubs which competed in the division last season, along with two new clubs, promoted from Division Two:

- Rye United
- Sidley United

=== League table ===
Pos	Team	Pld	W	D	L	GF	GA	GD	Pts	Qualification or relegation
1	Crawley Down	38	28	7	3	100	35	+65	91	Promoted to the Isthmian League Division One South
2	Rye United	38	23	7	8	76	37	+39	76	
3	Peacehaven & Telscombe	38	22	10	6	74	38	+36	76	
4	Pagham	38	23	2	13	91	53	+38	71	
5	Three Bridges	38	23	1	14	69	49	+20	70	
6	Hassocks	38	19	11	8	64	38	+26	68	
7	East Grinstead Town	38	20	6	12	88	50	+38	66	
8	Redhill	38	16	8	14	77	68	+9	56	
9	Arundel	38	15	9	14	81	68	+13	54	
10	Ringmer	38	16	4	18	67	72	−5	52	
11	Lingfield	38	13	10	15	71	83	−12	49	
12	Crowborough Athletic	38	14	6	18	59	67	−8	48	
13	Sidley United	38	13	9	16	46	59	−13	48	
14	Chichester City	38	14	6	18	57	62	−5	45 (Note: Chichester City were deducted three points.)	
15	Wick	38	13	6	19	54	74	−20	45	Demoted to Division Two
16	Hailsham Town	38	13	5	20	66	71	−5	44	Demoted to Division Two
17	Selsey	38	13	5	20	49	78	−29	44	
18	Shoreham	38	8	7	23	46	89	−43	31	
19	St Francis Rangers	38	8	5	25	35	81	−46	29	
20	Eastbourne United	38	2	4	32	26	124	−98	10	Relegated to Division Two

Source: fchd
Rules for classification: 1) points; 2) goal difference; 3) number of goals scored.

== Division Two ==
Sussex County Football League Division Two
- Season: 2010–11
- Champions: A.F.C. Uckfield
- Promoted: A.F.C. Uckfield; Lancing; Worthing United
- Relegated: Clymping
- Matches: 306
- Goals: 1,163 (3.8 per match)

Division Two featured 16 clubs which competed in the division last season, along with two new clubs:

- Bexhill United, promoted from Division Three
- Mile Oak, relegated from Division One

Also, Wealden changed name to A.F.C. Uckfield.

=== League table ===
Pos	Team	Pld	W	D	L	GF	GA	GD	Pts	Qualification or relegation
1	A.F.C. Uckfield	34	24	7	3	107	47	+60	79	Promoted to Division One
2	Lancing	34	24	6	4	103	30	+73	78	Promoted to Division One
3	Worthing United	34	22	7	5	84	38	+46	73	Promoted to Division One
4	Bexhill United	34	17	9	8	71	47	+24	60	
5	Seaford Town	34	16	10	8	69	42	+27	58	
6	Loxwood	34	18	4	12	71	51	+20	58	
7	Mile Oak	34	18	4	12	71	52	+19	58	
8	Storrington	34	15	4	15	64	57	+7	49	
9	Rustington	34	14	7	13	51	46	+5	49	
10	Westfield	34	14	7	13	67	70	−3	49	
11	Littlehampton Town	34	12	9	13	71	72	−1	45	
12	Southwick	34	13	6	15	55	59	−4	45	
13	Little Common	34	12	7	15	55	61	−6	43	
14	East Preston	34	9	7	18	57	84	−27	34	
15	Midhurst & Easebourne	34	7	6	21	40	74	−34	27	
16	Steyning Town	34	6	7	21	52	103	−51	25	
17	Oakwood	34	3	7	24	42	100	−58	16	
18	Clymping	34	3	4	27	33	130	−97	13	Relegated to Division Three

Source: fchd
Rules for classification: 1) points; 2) goal difference; 3) number of goals scored.

== Division Three ==
Sussex County Football League Division Three
- Season: 2010–11
- Champions: Dorking Wanderers
- Promoted: Dorking Wanderers
- Matches: 240
- Goals: 941 (3.92 per match)

Division Three featured 14 clubs which competed in the division last season, along with two new clubs:

- Barnham, joined from the West Sussex League
- Ferring, joined from the Worthing & District League

=== League table ===
Pos	Team	Pld	W	D	L	GF	GA	GD	Pts	Qualification or relegation
1	Dorking Wanderers	30	24	2	4	93	35	+58	74	Promoted to Division Two
2	Hurstpierpoint	30	18	4	8	61	37	+24	58	
3	Barnham	30	16	7	7	60	39	+21	55	
4	Bosham	30	17	4	9	73	55	+18	55	
5	Saltdean United	30	15	6	9	71	49	+22	51	
6	Broadbridge Heath	30	15	4	11	61	45	+16	49	
7	Newhaven	30	15	1	14	73	64	+9	46	
8	Haywards Heath Town	30	12	6	12	52	56	−4	42	
9	Pease Pottage Village	30	12	5	13	66	62	+4	41	
10	Rottingdean Village	30	11	6	13	41	49	−8	39	
11	T D Shipley	30	9	7	14	58	71	−13	34	
12	Ferring	30	9	6	15	56	67	−11	33	
13	Ifield Edwards	30	8	6	16	48	76	−28	30	
14	Uckfield Town	30	8	5	17	49	76	−27	29	
15	Forest	30	6	8	16	40	68	−28	26	
16	Sidlesham	30	4	5	21	39	92	−53	17	Relegated to the West Sussex League

Source: fchd
Rules for classification: 1) points; 2) goal difference; 3) number of goals scored.
