= 2011–12 Sussex County Football League =

The 2011–12 Sussex County Football League season was the 87th in the history of Sussex County Football League a football competition in England.

== Division One ==
Sussex County Football League Division One
- Season: 2011–12
- Champions: Three Bridges
- Promoted: Three Bridges
- Matches: 380
- Goals: 1,376 (3.62 per match)

Division One featured 16 clubs which competed in the division last season, along with four new clubs.

- Clubs promoted from Division Two:
  - A.F.C. Uckfield
  - Lancing
  - Worthing United
- Plus:
  - Horsham YMCA, relegated from the Isthmian League

=== League table ===
Pos	Team	Pld	W	D	L	GF	GA	GD	Pts	Qualification or relegation
1	Three Bridges	38	28	5	5	75	37	+38	89	Promoted to the Isthmian League Division One South
2	Lancing	38	26	8	4	88	37	+51	86	
3	Rye United	38	26	6	6	99	44	+55	84	
4	Hassocks	38	22	6	10	89	58	+31	72	
5	Peacehaven & Telscombe	38	21	8	9	83	51	+32	71	
6	Pagham	38	21	8	9	83	54	+29	71	
7	Lingfield	38	20	8	10	90	56	+34	65 (Note: Lingfield were deducted three points.)	
8	A.F.C. Uckfield	38	16	7	15	71	72	−1	55	
9	East Grinstead Town	38	17	4	17	71	77	−6	55	
10	Redhill	38	16	6	16	85	68	+17	54	
11	Sidley United	38	15	5	18	45	60	−15	50	
12	Selsey	38	13	5	20	62	75	−13	44	
13	Crowborough Athletic	38	12	7	19	69	82	−13	43	
14	Worthing United	38	10	12	16	63	91	−28	42	
15	Ringmer	38	11	7	20	50	62	−12	40	
16	Horsham YMCA	38	12	3	23	53	79	−26	39	
17	Arundel	38	10	8	20	59	88	−29	38	
18	Shoreham	38	9	9	20	65	93	−28	36	
19	St Francis Rangers	38	2	13	23	40	87	−47	19	
20	Chichester City	38	4	3	31	36	105	−69	15	

Source: fchd
Rules for classification: 1) points; 2) goal difference; 3) number of goals scored.

== Division Two ==
Sussex County Football League Division Two
- Season: 2011–12
- Champions: East Preston
- Promoted: East Preston; Hailsham Town; Dorking Wanderers
- Matches: 306
- Goals: 1,107 (3.62 per match)

Division Two featured 14 clubs which competed in the division last season, along with four new clubs:

- Dorking Wanderers, promoted from Division Three
- Eastbourne United Association, relegated from Division One
- Hailsham Town, demoted from Division One
- Wick, demoted from Division One

=== League table ===
Pos	Team	Pld	W	D	L	GF	GA	GD	Pts	Qualification or relegation
1	East Preston	34	29	3	2	124	34	+90	90	Promoted to Division One
2	Hailsham Town	34	24	6	4	86	34	+52	78	Promoted to Division One
3	Dorking Wanderers	34	21	6	7	80	48	+32	69	Promoted to Division One
4	Littlehampton Town	34	15	12	7	67	39	+28	57	
5	Loxwood	34	17	4	13	65	68	−3	55	
6	Eastbourne United Association	34	15	8	11	54	49	+5	53	
7	Bexhill United	34	16	5	13	60	64	−4	53	
8	Southwick	34	12	12	10	44	40	+4	48	
9	Storrington	34	11	8	15	62	59	+3	41	
10	Mile Oak	34	12	4	18	55	65	−10	40	
11	Rustington	34	10	10	14	52	68	−16	40	
12	Westfield	34	9	10	15	58	73	−15	37	
13	Steyning Town	34	9	8	17	54	74	−20	35	
14	Wick	34	9	6	19	40	70	−30	33	
15	Midhurst & Easebourne	34	10	4	20	62	102	−40	33 (Note: Midhurst & Easebourne were deducted one point.)	
16	Little Common	34	8	8	18	53	69	−16	32	
17	Seaford Town	34	9	4	21	47	64	−17	31	
18	Oakwood	34	5	12	17	44	87	−43	27	

Source: fchd
Rules for classification: 1) points; 2) goal difference; 3) number of goals scored.

== Division Three ==
Sussex County Football League Division Three
- Season: 2011–12
- Champions: Newhaven
- Promoted: Newhaven; Saltdean United; Broadbridge Heath
- Matches: 240
- Goals: 943 (3.93 per match)

Division Three featured 14 clubs which competed in the division last season, along with two new clubs:

- Clymping, relegated from Division Two
- Roffey, joined from the Mid-Sussex League

=== League table ===
Pos	Team	Pld	W	D	L	GF	GA	GD	Pts	Qualification or relegation
1	Newhaven	30	22	4	4	94	32	+62	70	Promoted to Division Two
2	Saltdean United	30	21	7	2	88	26	+62	70	Promoted to Division Two
3	Pease Pottage Village	30	22	1	7	94	44	+50	67	Resigned from the league
4	Barnham	30	19	3	8	91	44	+47	60	
5	Broadbridge Heath	30	17	5	8	67	43	+24	56	Promoted to Division Two
6	Forest	30	15	6	9	63	50	+13	51	Resigned from the league
7	Ferring	30	14	4	12	51	56	−5	46	
8	Rottingdean Village	30	14	3	13	53	71	−18	45	
9	Uckfield Town	30	10	10	10	60	61	−1	40	
10	Ifield Edwards	30	10	5	15	50	60	−10	35	
11	Bosham	30	9	6	15	45	58	−13	33	Demoted to the West Sussex League
12	Hurstpierpoint	30	9	6	15	45	61	−16	33	
13	T D Shipley	30	10	1	19	49	70	−21	31	
14	Clymping	30	5	3	22	31	96	−65	18	
15	Haywards Heath Town	30	3	7	20	29	69	−40	16	
16	Roffey	30	2	5	23	33	102	−69	11	

Source: fchd
Rules for classification: 1) points; 2) goal difference; 3) number of goals scored.
