= 2006–07 FA Cup qualifying rounds =

Tournament details
- Country: England; Wales

The 2006–07 FA Cup qualifying rounds opened the 126th season of competition in England for 'The Football Association Challenge Cup' (FA Cup), the world's oldest association football single knockout competition. A total of 687 clubs were accepted for the competition, up 13 from the previous season’s 674.

The large number of clubs entering the tournament from lower down (Levels 5 through 11) in the English football pyramid meant that the competition started with six rounds of preliminary (2) and qualifying (4) knockouts for these non-League teams. South Western Football League was the only level 11 league represented in the Cup, eleven clubs from the South Western Football League were the lowest-ranked clubs in competition. The 32 winning teams from Fourth qualifying round progressed to the First round proper, where League teams tiered at Levels 3 and 4 entered the competition.

== Calendar ==
Round	Start date	Leagues entering at this round	New entries this round	Winners from previous round	Number of fixtures	Prize money
Extra preliminary round	19 August 2006	Levels 9-11	258	none	129	£500
Preliminary round	2 September 2006	Level 8	203	129	166	£1,000
First qualifying round	16 September 2006	Level 7	66	166	116	£2,250
Second qualifying round	30 September 2006	Conference North; Conference South	44	116	80	£3,750
Third qualifying round	14 October 2006	none	none	80	40	£5,000
Fourth qualifying round	28 October 2006	Conference Premier	24	40	32	£10,000

== Extra preliminary round ==
Matches played on Friday/Saturday/Sunday 18 to 20 August 2006. 258 clubs from Level 9, Level 10 and Level 11 of English football, entered at this stage of the competition, while other 91 clubs from levels 9-11 get a bye to the preliminary round.

Tie	Home team (tier)	Score	Away team (tier)	Att.
1	New Mills (10)	2–1	Atherton Collieries (9)	71
2	Sunderland Nissan (9)	5–0	Darlington Railway Athletic (9)	50
3	Glasshoughton Welfare (9)	2–0	Bacup Borough (9)	29
4	Hall Road Rangers (10)	0–1	Durham City (9)	127
5	Atherton Laburnum Rovers (9)	5–1	Parkgate (10)	17
6	Congleton Town (9)	1–0	Winsford United (10)	153
7	Dunston Federation Brewery (9)	4–0	Holker Old Boys (10)	119
8	Cheadle Town (10)	3–1	Crook Town (10)	142
9	Whickham (10)	1–2	Marske United (10)	150
10	Jarrow Roofing BCA (9)	5–2	Billingham Synthonia (9)	67
11	Whitley Bay (9)	2–1	Northallerton Town (9)	139
12	Hebburn Town (10)	3–1	Alnwick Town (10)	69
13	Selby Town (9)	3–3	Morpeth Town (9)	58
replay	Morpeth Town (9)	3–1	Selby Town (9)	84
14	Salford City (9)	0–1	Shildon (9)	75
15	Billingham Town (9)	5–2	Borrowash Victoria (10)	110
16	Bishop Auckland (9)	3–1	Squires Gate (9)	84
17	Thackley (9)	1–1	Ramsbottom United (9)	77
replay	Ramsbottom United (9)	0–1	Thackley (9)	
18	Prudhoe Town (10)	0–5	Consett (9)	55
19	Blackpool Mechanics (10)	2–0	Armthorpe Welfare (9)	
Blackpool Mechanics played ineligible player, walkover victory given to Armthorpe Welfare
20	Ashington (9)	0–0	Thornaby (10)	146
replay	Thornaby (10)	3–2	Ashington (9)	60
21	Daisy Hill (10)	1–1	Winterton Rangers (10)	
replay	Winterton Rangers (10)	3–0	Daisy Hill (10)	91
22	West Allotment Celtic (9)	1–1	Norton & Stockton Ancients (10)	44
replay	Norton & Stockton Ancients (10)	6–1	West Allotment Celtic (9)	42
23	Brandon United (10)	3–5	Seaham Red Star (10)	65
24	Liversedge (9)	2–0	Nelson (9)	105
25	Oldham Town (10)	1–3	Trafford (9)	75
26	Pickering Town (9)	4–0	Formby (9)	131
27	Chadderton (10)	2–1	Rossington Main (10)	30
28	Retford United (9)	6–0	Tadcaster Albion (10)	157
29	Garforth Town (9)	2–0	Penrith (10)	86
30	Silsden (9)	1–1	Hallam (9)	101
replay	Hallam (9)	3–2	Silsden (9)	75
31	Tow Law Town (9)	1–1	St Helens Town (9)	93
replay	St Helens Town (9)	2–1	Tow Law Town (9)	92
32	Glossop North End (9)	2–0	North Shields (10)	102
33	Norton United (10)	1–5	Colne (9)	
34	Newcastle Blue Star (9)	3–1	South Shields (10)	97
35	Teversal (10)	0–3	Loughborough Dynamo (9)	73
36	Blackstones (9)	1–1	Oadby Town (9)	88
replay	Oadby Town (9)	3–2	Blackstones (9)	145
37	Quorn (9)	6–0	Arnold Town (9)	163
38	Mickleover Sports (9)	1–0	Glapwell (9)	167
39	Staveley Miners Welfare (10)	1–5	Boston Town (9)	75
40	Atherstone Town (9)	3–2	Carlton Town (9)	222
41	Eccleshall (10)	1–1	Pegasus Juniors (9)	59
replay	Pegasus Juniors (9)	0–3	Eccleshall (10)	91
42	Ford Sports Daventry (9)	2–2	Racing Club Warwick (9)	71
replay	Racing Club Warwick (9)	4–1	Ford Sports Daventry (9)	96
43	Deeping Rangers (9)	5–4	Lincoln Moorlands (10)	
44	Coalville Town (9)	4–0	Studley (9)	94
45	St Margaretsbury (9)	1–1	Eton Manor (9)	50
replay	Eton Manor (9)	1–1 (4–1 p)	St Margaretsbury (9)	22
46	Dereham Town (9)	3–1	Brentwood Town (9)	139
47	Sawbridgeworth Town (9)	1–2	St Neots Town (9)	101
48	Haverhill Rovers (10)	2–0	Welwyn Garden City (9)	119
49	Felixstowe & Walton United (9)	0–1	Potton United (9)	96
50	Holmer Green (9)	1–3	Wootton Blue Cross (9)	42
51	Halstead Town (9)	0–0	Harefield United (9)	92
replay	Harefield United (9)	3–1	Halstead Town (9)	115
52	Broxbourne Borough V & E (9)	1–0	Colney Heath (9)	30
53	Fakenham Town (10)	4–0	Norwich United (9)	86
54	Stanway Rovers (9)	0–1	Leverstock Green (9)	70
55	Wembley (9)	3–0	Thame United (9)	174
56	Hertford Town (9)	1–2	Stotfold (9)	67
57	Cogenhoe United (9)	2–2	Saffron Walden Town (10)	
replay	Saffron Walden Town (10)	6–2	Cogenhoe United (9)	127
58	Needham Market (9)	2–1	Desborough Town (9)	102
59	Bowers & Pitsea (9)	2–0	Haringey Borough (9)	66
60	Ruislip Manor (9)	3–1	Aylesbury Vale (9)	76
61	Mildenhall Town (9)	8–2	Kirkley (9)	115
62	Lowestoft Town (9)	3–1	Stansted (9)	228
63	Barkingside (9)	2–1	Clacton Town (9)	140

Tie	Home team (tier)	Score	Away team (tier)	Att.
64	Biggleswade Town (9)	4–2	Clapton (9)	34
65	Chalfont St Peter (9)	0–1	Hullbridge Sports (9)	63
66	Langford (9)	2–4	Ely City (10)	70
67	Gorleston (10)	0–1	Tiptree United (10)	69
68	March Town United (10)	3–3	St Ives Town (9)	185
replay	St Ives Town (9)	2–1	March Town United (10)	
69	Stowmarket Town (10)	1–1	Soham Town Rangers (9)	99
replay	Soham Town Rangers (9)	1–4	Stowmarket Town (10)	
70	Walsham le Willows (10)	1–4	Leiston (9)	202
71	Long Melford (10)	1–3	Cornard United (10)	84
72	Long Buckby (9)	2–1	London APSA (9)	70
73	Tring Athletic (9)	2–1	Diss Town (9)	105
74	Royston Town (9)	2–2	Harwich & Parkeston (9)	
replay	Harwich & Parkeston (9)	4–1	Royston Town (9)	
75	Newport Pagnell Town (9)	0–1	Romford (9)	133
76	Oxhey Jets (9)	3–0	Concord Rangers (9)	97
77	Ipswich Wanderers (9)	2–2	Woodbridge Town (9)	127
replay	Woodbridge Town (9)	1–3	Ipswich Wanderers (9)	179
78	London Colney (9)	0–1	Raunds Town (9)	53
79	Newmarket Town (9)	4–1	Southend Manor (9)	111
80	Arundel (9)	5–0	Dorking (9)	84
81	Farnham Town (10)	0–1	Three Bridges (9)	55
82	Moneyfields (9)	2–1	Oakwood (9)	64
83	Croydon (9)	1–2	Sandhurst Town (9)	79
84	Wick (9)	1–1	Westfield (Surrey) (10)	57
replay	Westfield (Surrey) (10)	0–0 (5–3 p)	Wick (9)	
85	East Preston (9)	3–1	Milton United (9)	79
86	Ash United (9)	5–0	Deal Town (9)	80
87	Chessington & Hook United (9)	3–1	Mile Oak (10)	151
88	Saltdean United (10)	0–1	Lancing (10)	49
89	North Leigh (9)	w/o	A.F.C. Newbury (11)	
Walkover for North Leigh – AFC Newbury removed
90	Henley Town (10)	w/o	Epsom & Ewell (9)	
Walkover for Epsom & Ewell – Henley Town removed
91	Brockenhurst (9)	1–2	Hamble ASSC (9)	48
92	Guildford City (9)	0–1	Whitstable Town (9)	95
93	Reading Town (9)	3–4	Thamesmead Town (9)	44
94	Egham Town (9)	2–3	Hungerford Town (9)	
95	Rye United (9)	0–2	Bedfont Green (9)	140
96	Hassocks (9)	1–0	Wantage Town (9)	91
97	Frimley Green (10)	1–5	VT (9)	30
98	Lymington Town (9)	0–4	Sidley United (9)	122
99	Sporting Bengal United (9)	0–2	Slade Green (9)	155
100	Selsey (9)	0–5	A.F.C. Totton (9)	135
101	Redhill (9)	1–2	Cowes Sports (9)	112
102	Eastbourne United Association (9)	0–0	Cobham (9)	84
replay	Cobham (9)	2–1	Eastbourne United Association (9)	45
103	Abingdon Town (9)	3–0	Camberley Town (9)	60
104	Raynes Park Vale (9)	1–6	Shoreham (9)	61
105	Hythe Town (9)	2–2	Lordswood (9)	147
replay	Lordswood (9)	0–6	Hythe Town (9)	70
106	Herne Bay (9)	1–6	Erith & Belvedere (9)	125
107	Erith Town (9)	0–2	Hailsham Town (9)	52
108	Banstead Athletic (9)	1–2	Worthing United (9)	49
109	Carterton (9)	1–0	Gosport Borough (9)	81
110	Devizes Town (9)	3–0	Calne Town (9)	79
111	Almondsbury Town (9)	0–1	Odd Down (9)	76
112	Christchurch (9)	3–1	Bitton (9)	63
113	Shortwood United (9)	4–2	Backwell United (10)	65
114	Fairford Town (9)	2–0	Harrow Hill (9)	83
115	Westbury United (10)	2–3	Slimbridge (9)	55
116	Welton Rovers (9)	2–0	Wimborne Town (9)	70
117	St Blazey (11)	1–0	Bodmin Town (11)	289
118	Corsham Town (9)	4–0	Shepton Mallet (10)	82
119	Melksham Town (9)	2–1	Torrington (9)	42
120	Bemerton Heath Harlequins (9)	1–3	Downton (9)	145
121	Bristol Manor Farm (9)	0–0	Barnstaple Town (9)	55
replay	Barnstaple Town (9)	5–3	Bristol Manor Farm (9)	160
122	Liskeard Athletic (11)	4–1	Sherborne Town (10)	88
123	Witney United (9)	2–1	Highworth Town (9)	145
124	Bournemouth (9)	2–0	Minehead Town (10)	70
125	Wadebridge Town (11)	1–1	Elmore (10)	
replay	Elmore (10)	3–2	Wadebridge Town (11)	57
126	Brislington (9)	0–1	Dawlish Town (9)	40
127	Hamworthy United (9)	1–2	Hallen (9)	100
128	Penzance (11)	1–2	Clevedon United (10)	105
129	Porthleven (11)	0–1	Newquay (11)	118

== Preliminary round ==
Matches played on weekend of Saturday 2 September 2006. A total of 332 clubs took part in this stage of the competition, including the 129 winners from the extra preliminary round, 91 clubs from Levels 9-11, who get a bye in the extra preliminary round and 112 entering at this stage from the five divisions at Level 8 of English football. The round featured seven clubs from Level 11 (all from the South Western Football League) still in the competition, being the lowest ranked clubs in this round.

Tie	Home team (tier)	Score	Away team (tier)	Att.
1	Pontefract Collieries (10)	0–3	Woodley Sports (8)	56
2	Spennymoor Town (10)	3–1	Bamber Bridge (8)	159
3	Trafford (9)	4–1	Brodsworth Welfare (9)	121
4	Bridlington Town (8)	1–2	Bishop Auckland (9)	144
5	Cammell Laird (8)	2–0	Morpeth Town (9)	135
6	Norton & Stockton Ancients (10)	5–1	Darwen (10)	40
7	Consett (9)	1–1	Rossendale United (8)	161
replay	Rossendale United (8)	2–1	Consett (9)	132
8	Eccleshill United (9)	2–1	Glasshoughton Welfare (9)	74
9	Garforth Town (9)	1–2	Chorley (8)	124
10	Guisborough Town (10)	0–3	Hallam (9)	130
11	Goole (8)	5–3	Bradford Park Avenue (8)	270
12	Pickering Town (9)	0–1	New Mills (10)	145
13	Atherton Laburnum Rovers (9)	0–3	Clitheroe (8)	
14	Glossop North End (9)	2–1	Seaham Red Star (10)	97
15	Shildon (9)	0–3	Harrogate Railway Athletic (8)	199
16	Bedlington Terriers (9)	1–4	Curzon Ashton (9)	188
17	St Helens Town (9)	0–3	Skelmersdale United (8)	141
18	Alsager Town (8)	6–0	Cheadle Town (10)	120
19	Sheffield (9)	0–0	Retford United (9)	264
replay	Retford United (9)	1–1 (0–3 p)	Sheffield (9)	272
20	Liversedge (9)	2–2	Newcastle Blue Star (9)	152
replay	Newcastle Blue Star (9)	3–2	Liversedge (9)	163
21	Yorkshire Amateur (10)	1–5	Warrington Town (8)	41
22	Abbey Hey (9)	1–2	Chadderton (10)	55
23	Thornaby (10)	0–2	Chester-le-Street Town (9)	63
24	Jarrow Roofing BCA (9)	5–4	Thackley (9)	57
25	Colwyn Bay (8)	1–1	Ossett Albion (8)	
replay	Ossett Albion (8)	4–2	Colwyn Bay (8)	99
26	Whitley Bay (9)	1–0	Stocksbridge Park Steels (8)	138
27	Maine Road (9)	1–2	Armthorpe Welfare (9)	
28	Sunderland Nissan (9)	3–2	Horden Colliery Welfare (9)	29
29	Winterton Rangers (10)	3–0	West Auckland Town (9)	101
30	Marske United (10)	3–1	Brigg Town (8)	149
31	Hebburn Town (10)	3–3	Flixton (9)	83
replay	Flixton (9)	3–0	Hebburn Town (10)	80
32	Padiham (10)	3–2	Colne (9)	158
33	Billingham Town (9)	4–0	Congleton Town (9)	140
34	Long Eaton United (9)	1–0	Washington (10)	86
35	Wakefield (8)	3–2	Dunston Federation Brewery (9)	126
36	Newcastle Benfield (BP) (9)	3–3	Ryton (10)	69
replay	Ryton (10)	0–2	Newcastle Benfield (BP) (9)	174
37	Esh Winning (10)	3–5	Durham City (9)	91
38	Rocester (9)	1–0	Oldbury United (9)	101
39	Eccleshall (10)	0–2	Shepshed Dynamo (8)	110
40	Kidsgrove Athletic (8)	2–0	Spalding United (8)	128
41	Tipton Town (9)	1–0	Rushall Olympic (8)	124
42	Coalville Town (9)	0–0	Chasetown (8)	180
replay	Chasetown (8)	3–1	Coalville Town (9)	343
43	Nantwich Town (9)	1–2	Deeping Rangers (9)	165
44	Gresley Rovers (8)	1–1	South Normanton Athletic (10)	223
replay	South Normanton Athletic (10)	1–1 (3–5 p)	Gresley Rovers (8)	145
45	Stratford Town (9)	2–2	Bourne Town (9)	125
replay	Bourne Town (9)	2–3	Stratford Town (9)	148
46	Buxton (8)	4–1	Atherstone Town (9)	418
47	Eastwood Town (8)	5–5	Bromsgrove Rovers (8)	178
replay	Bromsgrove Rovers (8)	2–0	Eastwood Town (8)	221
48	Gedling Town (10)	4–0	Holbeach United (9)	
49	Newcastle Town (9)	2–1 (a.e.t.)	Stourbridge (8)	
50	Sutton Coldfield Town (8)	3–0	Leek CSOB (10)	88
51	Alvechurch (9)	1–2	Bedworth United (8)	
52	Solihull Borough (8)	6–2	Sutton Town (9)	119
53	Belper Town (8)	2–2	Boston Town (9)	164
replay	Boston Town (9)	1–2	Belper Town (8)	84
54	Shirebrook Town (9)	3–1	Barwell (9)	90
55	Westfields (9)	3–0	Racing Club Warwick (9)	71
56	Quorn (9)	3–0	Malvern Town (8)	103
57	Romulus (9)	0–0	Stourport Swifts (8)	147
replay	Stourport Swifts (8)	0–5	Romulus (9)	70
58	Oadby Town (9)	7–0	Cradley Town (9)	136
59	Loughborough Dynamo (9)	1–2	Willenhall Town (8)	174
60	Biddulph Victoria (9)	2–2	Boldmere St Michaels (9)	94
replay	Boldmere St Michaels (9)	7–0	Biddulph Victoria (9)	69
61	Leamington (9)	6–0	Stone Dominoes (9)	527
62	Causeway United (9)	3–2	Mickleover Sports (9)	50
63	Great Yarmouth Town (10)	0–2	Needham Market (9)	109
64	Tilbury (8)	0–2	Romford (9)	102
65	Cornard United (10)	1–3	St Ives Town (9)	50
66	Wroxham (9)	1–1	Aylesbury United (8)	193
replay	Aylesbury United (8)	1–2	Wroxham (9)	186
67	Arlesey Town (8)	2–2	Ilford (8)	161
replay	Ilford (8)	1–2 (a.e.t.)	Arlesey Town (8)	74
68	Harefield United (9)	1–4	Wivenhoe Town (8)	121
69	Broxbourne Borough V & E (9)	1–1	Stotfold (9)	25
replay	Stotfold (9)	0–4	Broxbourne Borough V & E (9)	54
70	Long Buckby (9)	3–2	Flackwell Heath (8)	87
71	Harwich & Parkeston (9)	0–4	Leiston (9)	133
72	Marlow (8)	0–2	Waltham Forest (8)	116
73	Barkingside (9)	0–2	Maldon Town (8)	48
74	Haverhill Rovers (10)	3–0	Wootton Blue Cross (9)	132
75	Uxbridge (8)	0–2	Potton United (9)	79
76	Wisbech Town (9)	4–1	Mildenhall Town (9)	202
77	Biggleswade United (9)	2–4	A.F.C. Hornchurch (8)	173
78	Raunds Town (9)	1–1	Enfield (8)	109
replay	Enfield (8)	1–2	Raunds Town (9)	83
79	Bowers & Pitsea (9)	0–1	Dunstable Town (8)	72
80	Leverstock Green (9)	2–3	Beaconsfield SYCOB (8)	75
81	Stowmarket Town (10)	0–2	Dereham Town (9)	67
82	Northampton Spencer (9)	2–3	Chesham United (8)	138
83	St Neots Town (9)	2–2	Brackley Town (8)	148
replay	Brackley Town (8)	4–0	St Neots Town (9)	164

Tie	Home team (tier)	Score	Away team (tier)	Att.
84	Hadleigh United (10)	2–3	Rothwell Town (8)	124
85	Great Wakering Rovers (8)	4–1	Newmarket Town (9)	108
86	Hullbridge Sports (9)	0–2	Yaxley (9)	54
87	Tiptree United (10)	2–1	Ipswich Wanderers (9)	101
88	Lowestoft Town (9)	2–0	Witham Town (8)	298
89	Barton Rovers (8)	0–1	Barking (9)	
90	Biggleswade Town (9)	0–0	Leighton Town (8)	53
replay	Leighton Town (8)	2–0	Biggleswade Town (9)	
91	Potters Bar Town (8)	2–2	Waltham Abbey (8)	94
replay	Waltham Abbey (8)	1–2	Potters Bar Town (8)	
92	Ruislip Manor (9)	2–1	Enfield Town (8)	176
93	Hanwell Town (8)	2–2	Buckingham Town (9)	110
replay	Buckingham Town (9)	3–2	Hanwell Town (8)	110
94	Ely City (10)	0–3	Woodford United (8)	118
95	Bury Town (8)	6–1	Brook House (8)	160
96	Berkhamsted Town (8)	2–6	A.F.C. Sudbury (8)	172
97	Eton Manor (9)	0–2	Wingate & Finchley (8)	35
98	Hillingdon Borough (8)	1–2	Tring Athletic (9)	62
99	Burnham Ramblers (9)	0–0	Ware (8)	91
replay	Ware (8)	1–2	Burnham Ramblers (9)	93
100	Harlow Town (8)	0–1	Saffron Walden Town (10)	181
101	Aveley (8)	0–1	Oxhey Jets (9)	63
102	Canvey Island (8)	4–1	Fakenham Town (10)	341
103	Wembley (9)	0–3	Redbridge (8)	74
104	Hailsham Town (9)	0–1	A.F.C. Totton (9)	97
105	Kingstonian (8)	3–1	Pagham (10)	301
106	Hungerford Town (9)	1–0	Littlehampton Town (9)	
107	Croydon Athletic (8)	4–2	Arundel (9)	90
108	Fareham Town (9)	1–2	Carterton (9)	107
109	Cowes Sports (9)	1–0	Sandhurst Town (9)	135
110	Dover Athletic (8)	3–0	Bracknell Town (8)	510
111	Whyteleafe (8)	3–2	Ash United (9)	92
112	Fleet Town (8)	1–0	Thatcham Town (8)	128
113	Walton Casuals (8)	2–3	Cray Wanderers (8)	75
114	Sevenoaks Town (9)	1–3	Moneyfields (9)	83
115	Dulwich Hamlet (8)	3–0	Three Bridges (9)	
116	Colliers Wood United (9)	1–1	Chipstead (9)	77
replay	Chipstead (9)	1–2	Colliers Wood United (9)	86
117	AFC Wallingford (9)	1–0	Burnham (8)	55
118	Peacehaven & Telscombe (10)	0–1	Whitehawk (9)	112
119	Ashford Town (Kent) (8)	7–0	Bedfont Green (9)	147
120	Epsom & Ewell (9)	0–2	Leatherhead (8)	205
121	Bedfont (9)	0–1	Whitstable Town (9)	81
122	Maidstone United (8)	2–1	Burgess Hill Town (8)	400
123	Godalming Town (8)	1–1	North Greenford United (9)	
replay	North Greenford United (9)	4–2 (a.e.t.)	Godalming Town (8)	110
124	Slade Green (9)	2–2	Cobham (9)	74
replay	Cobham (9)	2–0	Slade Green (9)	67
125	Sittingbourne (8)	3–1	Thamesmead Town (9)	167
126	Eastbourne Town (9)	2–2	VCD Athletic (9)	259
replay	VCD Athletic (9)	1–0	Eastbourne Town (9)	154
127	Hassocks (9)	2–0	Newport (Isle of Wight) (8)	154
128	Ardley United (9)	3–0	Ringmer (9)	128
129	Hythe Town (9)	1–3	VT (9)	162
130	Lymington & New Milton (8)	4–2	Shoreham (9)	108
131	Cove (9)	0–6	Tooting & Mitcham United (8)	
132	Oxford City (8)	2–2	Abingdon United (8)	160
replay	Abingdon United (8)	3–4 (a.e.t.)	Oxford City (8)	303
133	Hastings United (8)	0–0	Merstham (9)	281
replay	Merstham (9)	2–4 (a.e.t.)	Hastings United (8)	147
134	Sidley United (9)	0–1	Worthing United (9)	195
135	Winchester City (8)	4–3	Chatham Town (8)	151
136	Horsham YMCA (8)	1–2	Molesey (8)	122
137	Lancing (10)	3–1	North Leigh (9)	84
138	East Preston (9)	w/o	Horley Town (10)	
Walkover for East Preston – Horley Town removed
139	Andover (8)	1–1	Corinthian Casuals (8)	134
replay	Corinthian Casuals (8)	3–4 (a.e.t.)	Andover (8)	
140	Windsor & Eton (8)	1–2	Bashley (8)	104
141	Metropolitan Police (8)	7–0	Chessington & Hook United (9)	108
142	Chertsey Town (9)	3–2	Abingdon Town (9)	75
143	Hamble ASSC (9)	1–1	East Grinstead Town (10)	77
replay	East Grinstead Town (10)	1–3	Hamble ASSC (9)	130
144	Tunbridge Wells (9)	0–5	Dartford (8)	280
145	Westfield (Surrey) (10)	2–5	Alton Town (9)	70
146	Didcot Town (8)	2–1	Erith & Belvedere (9)	206
147	Penryn Athletic (11)	2–3	Slimbridge (9)	72
148	Liskeard Athletic (11)	1–0	Welton Rovers (9)	68
149	Saltash United (11)	3–3	Barnstaple Town (9)	108
replay	Barnstaple Town (9)	0–1	Saltash United (11)	159
150	Odd Down (9)	0–1	Bridgwater Town (9)	
151	Downton (9)	2–1	Christchurch (9)	75
152	Radstock Town (9)	3–1	Elmore (10)	
153	Melksham Town (9)	1–2	Cinderford Town (8)	98
154	Street (9)	0–1	Bishop's Cleeve (8)	81
155	Tavistock (11)	4–2	Bridport (10)	120
156	Fairford Town (9)	3–0	Bournemouth (9)	64
157	Poole Town (9)	0–1	Taunton Town (8)	184
158	Evesham United (8)	6–0	Clevedon United (10)	128
159	Bideford (9)	2–1	Hallen (9)	192
160	Falmouth Town (11)	1–2	Bishop Sutton (9)	110
161	Paulton Rovers (8)	1–1	Witney United (9)	102
replay	Witney United (9)	1–2	Paulton Rovers (8)	146
162	Devizes Town (9)	1–1	Swindon Supermarine (8)	141
replay	Swindon Supermarine (8)	3–0	Devizes Town (9)	149
163	Chard Town (9)	0–4	Willand Rovers (9)	87
164	Shortwood United (9)	0–5	Truro City (10)	89
165	Corsham Town (9)	3–1	Dawlish Town (9)	103
166	Newquay (11)	1–1	St Blazey (11)	250
replay	St Blazey (11)	3–1	Newquay (11)	289

== First qualifying round ==
Matches on weekend of Saturday 16 September 2006. A total of 232 clubs took part in this stage of the competition, including the 166 winners from the Preliminary round and 66 entering at this stage from the top division of the three leagues at Level 7 of English football. The round featured four clubs from Level 11 (all from the South Western Football League) still in the competition, being the lowest ranked clubs in this round.

Tie	Home team (tier)	Score	Away team (tier)	Att.
1	Chorley (8)	1–3	North Ferriby United (7)	242
2	Durham City (9)	2–0	Alsager Town (8)	125
3	Eccleshill United (9)	1–2	Flixton (9)	76
4	Witton Albion (7)	3–2	Sheffield (9)	231
5	Armthorpe Welfare (9)	1–3	Burscough (7)	113
6	Cammell Laird (8)	0–2	Newcastle Benfield (BP) (9)	181
7	Fleetwood Town (7)	3–0	Jarrow Roofing BCA (9)	377
8	Guiseley (7)	2–1	Mossley (7)	253
9	Long Eaton United (9)	1–3	Warrington Town (8)	79
10	Glossop North End (9)	3–1	New Mills (10)	430
11	Chadderton (10)	1–1	Trafford (9)	123
replay	Trafford (9)	3–1	Chadderton (10)	151
12	Winterton Rangers (10)	0–5	Kendal Town (7)	106
13	Hallam (9)	2–1	Sunderland Nissan (9)	102
14	Clitheroe (8)	0–2	Marine (7)	345
15	Radcliffe Borough (7)	1–2	Skelmersdale United (8)	217
16	Whitby Town (7)	2–4	Frickley Athletic (7)	293
17	Harrogate Railway Athletic (8)	2–4	Marske United (10)	182
18	Gateshead (7)	3–1	Rossendale United (8)	166
19	Whitley Bay (9)	3–2	Norton & Stockton Ancients (10)	218
20	Newcastle Blue Star (9)	0–4	Prescot Cables (7)	103
21	Chester-le-Street Town (9)	0–1	Wakefield (8)	92
22	Woodley Sports (8)	4–0	Bishop Auckland (9)	103
23	Ossett Town (7)	1–2	Ossett Albion (8)	356
24	Curzon Ashton (9)	4–2	Billingham Town (9)	120
25	Goole (8)	4–1	Spennymoor Town (10)	252
26	Ashton United (7)	4–2	Padiham (10)	115
27	Sutton Coldfield Town (8)	3–0	Newcastle Town (9)	85
28	Oadby Town (9)	4–2	Grantham Town (7)	277
29	Bedworth United (8)	1–3	Matlock Town (7)	254
30	A.F.C. Telford United (7)	2–4	Halesowen Town (7)	1,472
31	Gresley Rovers (8)	0–1	Quorn (9)	208
32	Rugby Town (7)	4–1	Deeping Rangers (9)	202
33	Kidsgrove Athletic (8)	0–0	Leek Town (7)	395
replay	Leek Town (7)	0–1	Kidsgrove Athletic (8)	412
34	Romulus (9)	6–0	Shirebrook Town (9)	83
35	Hednesford Town (7)	1–1	Gedling Town (10)	367
replay	Gedling Town (10)	1–0	Hednesford Town (7)	150
36	Shepshed Dynamo (8)	0–2	Chasetown (8)	218
37	Causeway United (9)	2–0	Boldmere St Michaels (9)	110
38	Tipton Town (9)	1–1	Buxton (8)	191
replay	Buxton (8)	2–1	Tipton Town (9)	491
39	Belper Town (8)	4–0	Westfields (9)	142
40	Rocester (9)	1–0	Leamington (9)	267
41	Ilkeston Town (7)	1–1	Bromsgrove Rovers (8)	433
replay	Bromsgrove Rovers (8)	0–1	Ilkeston Town (7)	374
42	Corby Town (7)	1–3	Solihull Borough (8)	236
43	Lincoln United (7)	2–2	Stamford (7)	107
replay	Stamford (7)	1–2	Lincoln United (7)	258
44	Willenhall Town (8)	2–3	Stratford Town (9)	137
45	Canvey Island (8)	1–3	Lowestoft Town (9)	464
46	Boreham Wood (7)	8–2	St Ives Town (9)	201
47	Hendon (7)	4–0	Arlesey Town (8)	132
48	Potters Bar Town (8)	2–1	Wealdstone (7)	234
49	Hitchin Town (7)	1–1	Saffron Walden Town (10)	351
replay	Saffron Walden Town (10)	1–1 (1–4 p)	Hitchin Town (7)	517
50	Hemel Hempstead Town (7)	6–3	Leyton (7)	189
51	A.F.C. Sudbury (8)	1–0	Waltham Forest (8)	278
52	Woodford United (8)	3–1	Wroxham (9)	102
53	Great Wakering Rovers (8)	2–1	Burnham Ramblers (9)	164
54	Redbridge (8)	1–2	A.F.C. Hornchurch (8)	251
55	Heybridge Swifts (7)	6–1	Potton United (9)	209
56	Buckingham Town (9)	1–4	Raunds Town (9)	137
57	Hampton & Richmond Borough (7)	1–1	Billericay Town (7)	331
replay	Billericay Town (7)	0–0 (4–1 p)	Hampton & Richmond Borough (7)	58
58	Dunstable Town (8)	3–2	Leiston (9)	132
59	Haverhill Rovers (10)	3–1	Broxbourne Borough V & E (9)	176

Tie	Home team (tier)	Score	Away team (tier)	Att.
60	Banbury United (7)	5–1	Beaconsfield SYCOB (8)	382
61	Wingate & Finchley (8)	1–2	East Thurrock United (7)	77
62	Tiptree United (10)	0–4	Brackley Town (8)	86
63	Maldon Town (8)	2–1	Staines Town (7)	76
64	Tring Athletic (9)	1–5	King's Lynn (7)	301
65	Wivenhoe Town (8)	1–2	Yaxley (9)	83
66	Long Buckby (9)	1–2	Rothwell Town (8)	145
67	Bury Town (8)	0–2	Wisbech Town (9)	284
68	Oxhey Jets (9)	1–0	Ruislip Manor (9)	98
69	Harrow Borough (7)	2–0	Northwood (7)	225
70	Romford (9)	3–0	Leighton Town (8)	156
71	Chesham United (8)	2–3	Cheshunt (7)	338
72	Barking (9)	1–4	Chelmsford City (7)	269
73	Needham Market (9)	3–4	Dereham Town (9)	156
74	Worthing (7)	3–0	Colliers Wood United (9)	275
75	Ashford Town (Kent) (8)	1–3	Tonbridge Angels (7)	394
76	Cobham (9)	1–2	Slough Town (7)	200
77	Sittingbourne (8)	3–0	Hassocks (9)	183
78	Margate (7)	0–0	Fleet Town (8)	535
replay	Fleet Town (8)	0–1	Margate (7)	171
79	Maidenhead United (7)	1–1	Carterton (9)	197
replay	Carterton (9)	2–3	Maidenhead United (7)	120
80	Dover Athletic (8)	6–1	Alton Town (9)	559
81	Dartford (8)	0–2	Hastings United (8)	274
82	Whyteleafe (8)	1–2	Folkestone Invicta (7)	190
83	Ashford Town (Middx) (7)	4–0	Maidstone United (8)	401
84	Molesey (8)	1–1	Leatherhead (8)	198
replay	Leatherhead (8)	3–0	Molesey (8)	
85	Hungerford Town (9)	3–0	Ardley United (9)	61
86	Tooting & Mitcham United (8)	6–0	Lancing (10)	282
87	Bromley (7)	4–0	A.F.C. Totton (9)	610
88	Cowes Sports (9)	1–2	Lymington & New Milton (8)	179
89	Oxford City (8)	5–0	Chertsey Town (9)	134
90	North Greenford United (9)	0–1	VT (9)	68
91	Kingstonian (8)	1–2	Ramsgate (7)	317
92	Andover (8)	0–2	Carshalton Athletic (7)	197
93	Walton & Hersham (7)	3–0	Dulwich Hamlet (8)	141
94	Whitstable Town (9)	1–0	Croydon Athletic (8)	330
95	Winchester City (8)	2–2	Cray Wanderers (8)	193
replay	Cray Wanderers (8)	2–2 (5–4 p)	Winchester City (8)	168
96	Bashley (8)	5–0	VCD Athletic (9)	196
97	AFC Wimbledon (7)	1–0	Horsham (7)	1,966
98	Worthing United (9)	3–2	Hamble ASSC (9)	62
99	Didcot Town (8)	6–1	Whitehawk (9)	228
100	Moneyfields (9)	3–1	AFC Wallingford (9)	93
101	East Preston (9)	1–3	Metropolitan Police (8)	81
102	Fairford Town (9)	0–3	Cinderford Town (8)	94
103	Downton (9)	0–7	Team Bath (7)	160
104	St Blazey (11)	3–1	Saltash United (11)	255
105	Cirencester Town (7)	2–3	Merthyr Tydfil (7)	228
106	Bishop Sutton (9)	0–0	Bishop's Cleeve (8)	58
replay	Bishop's Cleeve (8)	5–1	Bishop Sutton (9)	158
107	Radstock Town (9)	1–6	Evesham United (8)	88
108	Mangotsfield United (7)	1–0	Paulton Rovers (8)	255
109	Taunton Town (8)	2–2	Swindon Supermarine (8)	264
replay	Swindon Supermarine (8)	2–3	Taunton Town (8)	176
110	Bath City (7)	0–0	Tiverton Town (7)	567
replay	Tiverton Town (7)	1–3	Bath City (7)	440
111	Bideford (9)	2–2	Bridgwater Town (9)	372
replay	Bridgwater Town (9)	0–2	Bideford (9)	
112	Clevedon Town (7)	1–1	Truro City (10)	231
replay	Truro City (10)	0–1	Clevedon Town (7)	580
113	Gloucester City (7)	0–0	Liskeard Athletic (11)	344
replay	Liskeard Athletic (11)	0–3	Gloucester City (7)	200
114	Yate Town (7)	1–2	Slimbridge (9)	190
115	Chippenham Town (7)	2–0	Corsham Town (9)	671
116	Willand Rovers (9)	4–0	Tavistock (11)	102

== Second qualifying round ==
Matches played on weekend of Saturday 30 September 2006. A total of 160 clubs took part in this stage of the competition, including the 116 winners from the first qualifying round and 44 Level 6 clubs, from Conference North and Conference South, entering at this stage. St Blazey from Level 11 of English football were the lowest-ranked club to qualify for this round of the competition.

Tie	Home team (tier)	Score	Away team (tier)	Att.
1	North Ferriby United (7)	0–2	Whitley Bay (9)	174
2	Leigh RMI (6)	0–2	Woodley Sports (8)	130
3	Droylsden (6)	2–0	Worksop Town (6)	474
4	Burscough (7)	1–2	Blyth Spartans (6)	334
5	Trafford (9)	5–0	Glossop North End (9)	169
6	Marske United (10)	0–2	Skelmersdale United (8)	349
7	Farsley Celtic (6)	3–0	Wakefield (8)	173
8	Witton Albion (7)	3–0	Vauxhall Motors (6)	308
9	Prescot Cables (7)	1–2	Marine (7)	332
10	Hyde United (6)	0–2	Newcastle Benfield (BP) (9)	268
11	Scarborough (6)	1–1	Lancaster City (6)	667
replay	Lancaster City (6)	1–2	Scarborough (6)	248
12	Ashton United (7)	0–2	Gainsborough Trinity (6)	153
13	Durham City (9)	5–1	Hallam (9)	125
14	Flixton (9)	1–2	Barrow (6)	222
15	Ossett Albion (8)	2–1	Workington (6)	210
16	Curzon Ashton (9)	0–2	Harrogate Town (6)	173
17	Guiseley (7)	1–0	Gateshead (7)	402
18	Fleetwood Town (7)	4–2	Goole (8)	427
19	Stalybridge Celtic (6)	1–1	Frickley Athletic (7)	449
replay	Frickley Athletic (7)	0–1	Stalybridge Celtic (6)	338
20	Kendal Town (7)	1–1	Warrington Town (8)	245
replay	Warrington Town (8)	3–2	Kendal Town (7)	132
21	Raunds Town (9)	1–2	Stratford Town (9)	126
22	Halesowen Town (7)	3–1	Chasetown (8)	598
23	Sutton Coldfield Town (8)	0–2	Cambridge City (6)	163
24	Worcester City (6)	2–2	Romulus (9)	692
replay	Romulus (9)	1–3	Worcester City (6)	344
25	Solihull Borough (8)	1–1	Alfreton Town (6)	265
replay	Alfreton Town (6)	1–3	Solihull Borough (8)	229
26	Histon (6)	0–1	Matlock Town (7)	514
27	Lincoln United (7)	0–2	Hucknall Town (6)	158
28	Redditch United (6)	2–3	Wisbech Town (9)	387
29	Oadby Town (9)	0–6	Nuneaton Borough (6)	714
30	Kidsgrove Athletic (8)	6–0	Rothwell Town (8)	200
31	Gedling Town (10)	0–2	Rocester (9)	79
32	Belper Town (8)	1–1	Quorn (9)	209
replay	Quorn (9)	3–1	Belper Town (8)	317
33	King's Lynn (7)	3–1	Causeway United (9)	849
34	Ilkeston Town (7)	1–3	Rugby Town (7)	393
35	Kettering Town (6)	5–1	Yaxley (9)	1,066
36	Moor Green (6)	4–2	Hinckley United (6)	302
37	Buxton (8)	0–1	Woodford United (8)	542
38	East Thurrock United (7)	1–2	Maidenhead United (7)	122
39	Cray Wanderers (8)	1–1	Leatherhead (8)	160
replay	Leatherhead (8)	4–2	Cray Wanderers (8)	227
40	Ramsgate (7)	0–1	Yeading (6)	316
41	Heybridge Swifts (7)	2–2	Didcot Town (8)	270
replay	Didcot Town (8)	1–3	Heybridge Swifts (7)	344
42	Braintree Town (6)	0–2	Brackley Town (8)	365

Tie	Home team (tier)	Score	Away team (tier)	Att.
43	Hemel Hempstead Town (7)	4–2	Harrow Borough (7)	265
44	AFC Wimbledon (7)	3–0	Oxhey Jets (9)	1,747
45	Worthing United (9)	4–2	Romford (9)	165
46	Hastings United (8)	1–1	Metropolitan Police (8)	351
replay	Metropolitan Police (8)	5–1	Hastings United (8)	134
47	Hendon (7)	0–2	Lewes (6)	210
48	Fisher Athletic (6)	7–1	Sittingbourne (8)	204
49	Maldon Town (8)	0–0	Potters Bar Town (8)	149
replay	Potters Bar Town (8)	3–2	Maldon Town (8)	102
50	Sutton United (6)	1–3	Bishop's Stortford (6)	449
51	Haverhill Rovers (10)	1–0	Eastbourne Borough (6)	504
52	Farnborough Town (6)	2–0	Slough Town (7)	525
53	Worthing (7)	0–0	Cheshunt (7)	326
replay	Cheshunt (7)	1–0	Worthing (7)	122
54	Great Wakering Rovers (8)	0–1	Carshalton Athletic (7)	165
55	Lowestoft Town (9)	0–1	Bromley (7)	651
56	Tooting & Mitcham United (8)	2–3	A.F.C. Sudbury (8)	392
57	Folkestone Invicta (7)	1–1	Welling United (6)	508
replay	Welling United (6)	3–1	Folkestone Invicta (7)	543
58	Whitstable Town (9)	1–2	Margate (7)	1,144
59	Walton & Hersham (7)	2–2	Ashford Town (Middx) (7)	202
replay	Ashford Town (Middx) (7)	3–1 (a.e.t.)	Walton & Hersham (7)	247
60	Billericay Town (7)	0–0	Hayes (6)	458
replay	Hayes (6)	2–1	Billericay Town (7)	193
61	Thurrock (6)	0–3	Dover Athletic (8)	274
62	Tonbridge Angels (7)	1–1	Banbury United (7)	596
replay	Banbury United (7)	1–2	Tonbridge Angels (7)	518
63	Bedford Town (6)	3–2	Dunstable Town (8)	616
64	Hitchin Town (7)	0–0	Bognor Regis Town (6)	356
replay	Bognor Regis Town (6)	0–1	Hitchin Town (7)	340
65	Boreham Wood (7)	0–2	A.F.C. Hornchurch (8)	311
66	Dereham Town (9)	2–2	Chelmsford City (7)	472
replay	Chelmsford City (7)	4–0	Dereham Town (9)	646
67	Dorchester Town (6)	3–0	Cinderford Town (8)	308
68	Bishop's Cleeve (8)	3–1	Oxford City (8)	203
69	Eastleigh (6)	3–2	Gloucester City (7)	418
70	Clevedon Town (7)	3–1	Willand Rovers (9)	186
71	Slimbridge (9)	3–1	Chippenham Town (7)	375
72	Lymington & New Milton (8)	0–0	Basingstoke Town (6)	202
replay	Basingstoke Town (6)	1–0	Lymington & New Milton (8)	324
73	Bideford (9)	0–3	Newport County (6)	680
74	Bashley (8)	3–1	Taunton Town (8)	279
75	Moneyfields (9)	0–4	Evesham United (8)	157
76	Bath City (7)	0–0	Merthyr Tydfil (7)	645
replay	Merthyr Tydfil (7)	3–2	Bath City (7)	553
77	Havant & Waterlooville (6)	3–1	Team Bath (7)	281
78	VT (9)	1–2	Salisbury City (6)	370
79	Weston-super-Mare (6)	1–2	Hungerford Town (9)	247
80	Mangotsfield United (7)	3–1	St Blazey (11)	302

== Third qualifying round ==
Matches played on weekend of Saturday 14 October 2006. A total of 80 clubs took part, all having progressed from the second qualifying round. Haverhill Rovers from Level 10 of English football were the lowest-ranked club to qualify for this round of the competition.

Tie	Home team (tier)	Score	Away team (tier)	Att.
1	Ossett Albion (8)	1–1	Scarborough (6)	582
replay	Scarborough (6)	2–0	Ossett Albion (8)	804
2	Durham City (9)	0–1	Barrow (6)	287
3	Woodley Sports (8)	0–2	Gainsborough Trinity (6)	435
4	Droylsden (6)	3–2	Skelmersdale United (8)	490
5	Whitley Bay (9)	2–2	Blyth Spartans (6)	2,023
replay	Blyth Spartans (6)	1–2	Whitley Bay (9)	1,697
6	Trafford (9)	0–1	Harrogate Town (6)	284
7	Guiseley (7)	0–1	Newcastle Benfield (BP) (9)	429
8	Marine (7)	3–2	Stalybridge Celtic (6)	511
9	Witton Albion (7)	1–1	Farsley Celtic (6)	343
replay	Farsley Celtic (6)	1–0	Witton Albion (7)	224
10	Fleetwood Town (7)	2–0	Warrington Town (8)	567
11	Halesowen Town (7)	1–2	King's Lynn (7)	682
12	Nuneaton Borough (6)	0–1	Hucknall Town (6)	1,090
13	Bedford Town (6)	0–2	Moor Green (6)	632
14	Solihull Borough (8)	1–2	Wisbech Town (9)	274
15	Cambridge City (6)	0–0	Matlock Town (7)	414
replay	Matlock Town (7)	2–3	Cambridge City (6)	504
16	Woodford United (8)	1–3	A.F.C. Sudbury (8)	309
17	Kettering Town (6)	2–1	Rocester (9)	1,057
18	Worcester City (6)	1–1	Hemel Hempstead Town (7)	767
replay	Hemel Hempstead Town (7)	0–2	Worcester City (6)	366
19	Bishop's Stortford (6)	2–0	Stratford Town (9)	489
20	Rugby Town (7)	1–3	Chelmsford City (7)	546

Tie	Home team (tier)	Score	Away team (tier)	Att.
21	Haverhill Rovers (10)	2–1	Kidsgrove Athletic (8)	669
22	Quorn (9)	0–0	Brackley Town (8)	320
replay	Brackley Town (8)	2–1	Quorn (9)	230
23	Mangotsfield United (7)	1–1	Leatherhead (8)	381
replay	Leatherhead (8)	4–1	Mangotsfield United (7)	282
24	Bashley (8)	1–2	Hungerford Town (9)	320
25	Maidenhead United (7)	3–1	Worthing United (9)	304
26	Dorchester Town (6)	0–4	Lewes (6)	425
27	Heybridge Swifts (7)	2–3	Dover Athletic (8)	424
28	Hayes (6)	1–3	Bromley (7)	261
29	Margate (7)	1–2	Potters Bar Town (8)	725
30	A.F.C. Hornchurch (8)	1–1	Welling United (6)	1,002
replay	Welling United (6)	3–1	A.F.C. Hornchurch (8)	712
31	Clevedon Town (7)	1–1	Hitchin Town (7)	203
replay	Hitchin Town (7)	2–2 (3–4 p)	Clevedon Town (7)	286
32	Fisher Athletic (6)	6–1	Metropolitan Police (8)	237
33	Cheshunt (7)	1–2	Tonbridge Angels (7)	265
34	Eastleigh (6)	0–1	Salisbury City (6)	1,402
35	Newport County (6)	4–2	Bishop's Cleeve (8)	809
36	AFC Wimbledon (7)	2–1	Evesham United (8)	1,935
37	Merthyr Tydfil (7)	2–0	Slimbridge (9)	511
38	Havant & Waterlooville (6)	2–0	Carshalton Athletic (7)	246
39	Farnborough Town (6)	1–1	Yeading (6)	564
replay	Yeading (6)	3–0	Farnborough Town (6)	206
40	Basingstoke Town (6)	3–0	Ashford Town (Middx) (7)	626

== Fourth qualifying round ==
Matches played on weekend of Saturday 28 October 2006. A total of 64 clubs took part, 40 having progressed from the third qualifying round and 24 clubs from Conference Premier, forming Level 5 of English football, entering at this stage. Haverhill Rovers from Level 10 of English football were the lowest-ranked club to qualify for this round of the competition.

Tie	Home team (tier)	Score	Away team (tier)	Att.
1	Barrow (6)	3–2	Marine (7)	1,078
2	Stafford Rangers (5)	3–0	Scarborough (6)	1,043
3	Tamworth (5)	3–1	Harrogate Town (6)	719
4	Gainsborough Trinity (6)	2–0	Whitley Bay (9)	780
5	King's Lynn (7)	3–0	Hucknall Town (6)	1,371
6	Newcastle Benfield (BP) (9)	0–1	York City (5)	926
7	Fleetwood Town (7)	3–0	Wisbech Town (9)	1,005
8	Rushden & Diamonds (5)	3–0	Altrincham (5)	1,509
9	Burton Albion (5)	1–0	Halifax Town (5)	1,938
10	Northwich Victoria (5)	2–0	Cambridge United (5)	1,039
11	Farsley Celtic (6)	2–1	Cambridge City (6)	494
12	Southport (5)	0–1	Kettering Town (6)	943
13	Kidderminster Harriers (5)	5–1	Droylsden (6)	1,424
14	Moor Green (6)	1–2	Morecambe (5)	550
15	Worcester City (6)	1–1	Basingstoke Town (6)	1,128
replay	Basingstoke Town (6)	1–1 (7–6 p)	Worcester City (6)	681
16	Crawley Town (5)	2–3	Lewes (6)	1,646

Tie	Home team (tier)	Score	Away team (tier)	Att.
17	Dover Athletic (8)	0–0	Bishop's Stortford (6)	1,322
replay	Bishop's Stortford (6)	3–2	Dover Athletic (8)	767
18	Hungerford Town (9)	0–3	Weymouth (5)	839
19	Woking (5)	3–2	Potters Bar Town (8)	1,443
20	Maidenhead United (7)	1–0	Merthyr Tydfil (7)	711
21	Welling United (6)	0–3	Clevedon Town (7)	802
22	Stevenage Borough (5)	4–1	Forest Green Rovers (5)	1,190
23	Tonbridge Angels (7)	0–1	Newport County (6)	1,549
24	Dagenham & Redbridge (5)	0–1	Oxford United (5)	2,605
25	Yeading (6)	2–1	St Albans City (5)	376
26	Haverhill Rovers (10)	0–4	Aldershot Town (5)	1,710
27	Exeter City (5)	2–1	AFC Wimbledon (7)	4,625
28	A.F.C. Sudbury (8)	1–2	Leatherhead (8)	613
29	Chelmsford City (7)	1–0	Gravesend & Northfleet (5)	1,609
30	Grays Athletic (5)	1–2	Bromley (7)	820
31	Fisher Athletic (6)	0–1	Salisbury City (6)	432
32	Brackley Town (8)	0–2	Havant & Waterlooville (6)	505

== Competition proper ==
See 2006–07 FA Cup for details of the rounds from the first round proper onwards.
