= Dominic Di Paola =

English/Italian football manager (born 1982)

Personal information
- Full name: Dominic Di Paola
- Date of birth: 11 January 1982 (age 44)
- Place of birth: Brighton, England
- Height: 5 ft 11 in (1.80 m)

Managerial career
- Years: Team
- 2007–2010: Clymping
- 2010–2011: Worthing United
- 2011–2014: East Preston
- 2014–2015: Hastings United
- 2015–present: Horsham

Dominic Di Paola (born 11 January 1982) is an English football manager who manages National League South club Horsham.

== Managerial career ==
Di Paola began his managerial career with Clymping, a small village club in West Sussex. In 2010, after two promotions in two seasons from the West Sussex League to County League Division Two he moved to Worthing United and led them to promotion to Division One of the Sussex County League.

At the end of his one season there he took over at struggling East Preston. In his first year he won a Sussex Division Two League and Cup double. The following season, East Preston won the Sussex RUR, and achieved third place in the Sussex County Division One, their first year at that level. The following season, East Preston secured another double of the Sussex County League Division One title and the John O’Hara Cup, alongside a last-16-run in the national FA Vase. Despite a strong start to the following season, Di Paola moved to Step 4 Hastings United in October 2014 before resigning three months later.

With Horsham relegated to Step 5, Di Paola was asked to take over with three games of the season to go in 2015, conducting a complete rebuild of the playing squad before leading the club to promotion at the first time of asking back to Step 4. A couple of mid-table finishes followed before another promotion to the Isthmian Premier League with a dramatic playoff win against Ashford United 2-1 in extra time.

Following the impact of COVID-19 of sport in the U.K., in 2021, under Di Paola's management, Horsham qualified for the first Round of the FA Cup for the first time for the club since 2007 with an away tie at Carlisle and a league cup win against Margate for Horsham's first cup win in 19 years.. In 2023-24 Horsham qualified for the Isthmian Premier Division Play-Offs where Horsham lost out to Chatham Town on penalties, however the season was rescued with a Sussex Senior Cup win for the first time for the club in 48 years. The season also saw the club get to the 2nd Round of the FA Cup, equalling Horsham's best ever run as well as a last 16 run in the FA Trophy - another club record.

The following year saw Horsham again get to the 1st Round of the FA Cup. In a tight title race Horsham then ended the season as the Isthmian Premier Division Champions in the 2024–25 season rounding off the season with a Sussex Senior Cup double with a last minute win against Littlehampton Town.

=== Managerial statistics ===
As of match played 15 May 2025

Managerial record by team and tenure
Team	From	To	Record				
Team	From	To	G	W	D	L	Win %
Clymping	24 June 2007	25 May 2010	112	70	12	30	63
Worthing United	25 May 2010	28 May 2011	42	24	7	11	57
East Preston	1 June 2011	4 October 2014	179	130	24	25	73
Hastings United	4 October 2014	1 January 2015	16	5	4	7	31
Horsham	7 April 2015	Present	504	271	77	156	54
Total			885	514	129	242	58

=== Achievements ===
Clymping

- West Sussex Football League Premier Division Runners Up: 2007-08
- West Sussex Football League Malcolm Simmonds Cup: 2007-08
- Sussex County Football League Division Three: 2008-09
- Vernon Wentworth Cup: 2008-09:

East Preston

- Sussex County Football League Division Two: 2011-12
- Sussex County Football League Division Two Cup: 2011-12
- The Sussex Royal Ulster Rifles Charity Cup: 2012-13
- John O'Hara Cup: 2013-14
- Sussex County Football League Division One: 2013-14

Horsham

- Southern Combination Football League Premier Division: 2015-16
- Isthmian League Division One South East Play-Off Final Winners: 2018-19
- Isthmian League Cup: 2021-22
- Isthmian League Premier Division: 2024–25
- Sussex Senior Challenge Cup: 2023–24

Individual

- Sussex County Football League Division Three - Manager Of The Year: 2008-09
- Sussex County Football League Division Two - Manager Of The Year: 2011-12
- Sussex County Football League Division One - Manager Of The Year: 2013-14
- Isthmian League Premier Division - Manager Of The Year: 2024-25
- Isthmian League Division One South East - Manager of the Month: October 2018, November 2018, April 2019
- Isthmian League Premier Division - Manager of the Month: September 2019, November 2021, April 2022
- National League South Manager of the Month: October 2025
