= 1967–68 Sussex County Football League =

The 1967–68 Sussex County Football League season was the 43rd in the history of Sussex County Football League a football competition in England.

== Division One ==
Sussex County Football League Division One
- Season: 1967–68
- Champions: Chichester City
- Relegated: Lancing; Newhaven
- Matches played: 240
- Goals scored: 867 (3.61 per match)

Division One featured 14 clubs which competed in the division last season, along with two new clubs, promoted from Division Two:

- Arundel
- Wadhurst

=== League table ===
Pos	Team	Pld	W	D	L	GF	GA	GR	Pts	Qualification or relegation
1	Chichester City	30	17	10	3	78	38	2.053	44	
2	Bexhill Town Athletic	30	19	6	5	68	38	1.789	44	
3	Southwick	30	17	5	8	72	36	2.000	39	
4	Haywards Heath	30	16	7	7	53	34	1.559	39	
5	Seaford Town	30	15	6	9	55	50	1.100	36	
6	Rye United	30	14	7	9	68	40	1.700	35	
7	Horsham YMCA	30	13	9	8	56	42	1.333	35	
8	Sidley United	30	11	6	13	49	49	1.000	28	
9	Bognor Regis Town	30	11	6	13	44	52	0.846	28	
10	Arundel	30	12	4	14	48	60	0.800	28	
11	East Grinstead	30	12	3	15	61	69	0.884	27	
12	Littlehampton Town	30	10	4	16	43	57	0.754	24	
13	Wadhurst	30	9	5	16	59	76	0.776	23	
14	Selsey	30	10	1	19	45	78	0.577	21	
15	Lancing	30	6	5	19	40	64	0.625	17	Relegated to Division Two
16	Newhaven	30	4	4	22	28	84	0.333	12	Relegated to Division Two

Source: nonleaguematters
Rules for classification: 1) points; 2) goal ratio.

== Division Two ==
Sussex County Football League Division Two
- Season: 1967–68
- Champions: Whitehawk
- Promoted: Whitehawk; Wigmore Athletic
- Matches played: 210
- Goals scored: 813 (3.87 per match)

Division Two featured 13 clubs which competed in the division last season, along with two new clubs, relegated from Division One:

- Shoreham
- Whitehawk

=== League table ===
Pos	Team	Pld	W	D	L	GF	GA	GR	Pts	Qualification or relegation
1	Whitehawk	28	22	3	3	75	31	2.419	47	Promoted to Division One
2	Wigmore Athletic	28	15	8	5	58	46	1.261	38	Promoted to Division One
3	Portfield	28	16	3	9	72	41	1.756	35	
4	Shoreham	28	14	5	9	49	39	1.256	33	
5	Hastings & St Leonards	28	16	1	11	72	57	1.263	33	
6	Three Bridges	28	12	6	10	50	46	1.087	30	
7	Hastings Rangers	28	11	5	12	65	60	1.083	27	
8	Ferring	28	11	5	12	39	50	0.780	27	
9	APV Athletic	28	8	10	10	45	54	0.833	26	
10	Ringmer	28	10	5	13	57	55	1.036	25	
11	Burgess Hill	28	9	4	15	58	73	0.795	22	
12	Old Varndeanians	28	10	2	16	52	72	0.722	22	
13	Wick	28	8	4	16	44	58	0.759	20	
14	Steyning	28	7	6	15	41	62	0.661	20	
15	Brighton Old Grammarians	28	5	5	18	36	69	0.522	15	

Source: nonleaguematters
Rules for classification: 1) points; 2) goal ratio.
