= 1927–28 Sussex County Football League =

Sussex County Football League
- Season: 1927–28
- Champions: Southwick
- Matches played: 132
- Goals scored: 736 (5.58 per match)

The 1927–28 Sussex County Football League season was the eighth in the history of the competition.

== League table ==
The league featured 12 clubs, 10 which competed in the last season, along with two new clubs:

- Bognor Regis
- Haywards Heath

Allen West changed name to Bexhill.

=== League table ===
| Pos | Team | Pld | W | D | L | GF | GA | GR | Pts | Qualification or relegation |
|---|---|---|---|---|---|---|---|---|---|---|
| 1 | Southwick | 22 | 20 | 1 | 1 | 112 | 28 | 4.000 | 41 | |
| 2 | Worthing | 22 | 18 | 2 | 2 | 79 | 19 | 4.158 | 38 | |
| 3 | Haywards Heath | 22 | 10 | 3 | 9 | 62 | 62 | 1.000 | 23 | |
| 4 | Chichester | 22 | 8 | 6 | 8 | 57 | 67 | 0.851 | 22 | |
| 5 | Horsham | 22 | 10 | 1 | 11 | 69 | 65 | 1.062 | 21 | |
| 6 | Eastbourne Old Comrades | 22 | 9 | 2 | 11 | 61 | 57 | 1.070 | 20 | Left the League |
| 7 | Newhaven | 22 | 8 | 4 | 10 | 53 | 64 | 0.828 | 20 | |
| 8 | Bexhill | 22 | 10 | 0 | 12 | 51 | 72 | 0.708 | 20 | |
| 9 | Vernon Athletic | 22 | 8 | 1 | 13 | 54 | 76 | 0.711 | 17 | |
| 10 | Hove | 22 | 6 | 5 | 11 | 38 | 66 | 0.576 | 17 | |
| 11 | Bognor Regis | 22 | 6 | 4 | 12 | 44 | 68 | 0.647 | 16 | |
| 12 | Lewes | 22 | 3 | 3 | 16 | 56 | 92 | 0.609 | 9 | |

Source: Non-League Matters
Rules for classification: 1) points; 2) goal difference; 3) number of goals scored.
The points system until the 1982–83 season: 2 points for a win, 1 point for a draw and 0 points for losing.
