= Marc White =

English football manager (born 1973)

- Born: 1 October 1973 (age 53)
- Occupations: Founder, owner, chairman
- Board member of: Dorking Wanderers
Association football career
- Date of birth: 1 October 1973 (age 53)
- Position: Forward
Team information
- Current team: Dorking Wanderers (manager)
Senior career*
Years	Team	Apps	(Gls)
1999–2007	Dorking Wanderers		
Managerial career
- 1999–: Dorking Wanderers
- * Club domestic league appearances and goals

Marc James Warren White (born 1 October 1973) is an English businessman who is best known for being founder, owner, chairman, former football player and current manager of National League South club Dorking Wanderers.

White founded Dorking Wanderers with friends in 1999 as an amateur team and initially played for them, as well as running the club he went on to become first team manager. White has overseen 12 promotions in 23 years and has seen the club move from the seventeenth-tier of English football to the fifth.

== Managerial career ==
White founded Dorking Wanderers in 1999 along with Mark Lewington, Ian Davidson, Lee Spickett and Penny Gregg. The club were founded in Division 5 of the Crawley & District Football League. He helped Dorking Wanderers achieve 12 promotions within 23 seasons from the English seventeenth tier to the English fifth tier.

White’s dual role as manager and chairman proved crucial during the club’s relocation to the refurbished £8 million Meadowbank Stadium in July 2018. Up until that point, White had spent a decade personally funding updates to their picturesque but restrictive Westhumble ground to meet strict league rules. When the town’s older, historic club, Dorking F.C., folded in 2017, White quickly orchestrated a takeover of their defunct lease and negotiated a long-term deal with the Surrey FA to move the Wanderers into the new central facility. White used the move and the stadium's state-of-the-art synthetic pitch as a primary selling point to attract high-profile semi-professional players, explicitly stating his ambition was to transition the former park side into a Football League club.

White’s most dominant league campaign came during the 2018–19 season, where he managed Dorking Wanderers to the Isthmian League Premier Division championship. His squad ran away with the league title to secure automatic promotion to the National League South, marking the first time White had pushed the club into the regionalized second tier of non-league football.

In 2020, Dorking Wanderers became one of the main subjects of the non-league football channel, Bunch of Amateurs. White’s profile expanded significantly into mainstream British sports culture through his central role in "Dorking Uncovered," a long-running, multi-season fly-on-the-wall documentary series produced by Bunch of Amateurs. Broadcast digitally to hundreds of thousands of viewers, the series provided unprecedented, raw access into White's dual operations as both a first-team manager and club owner. The documentary heavily popularized White's management style across social media networks, prominently showcasing his unfiltered, profanity-laden dressing-room team talks, tactical boards, and direct corporate interactions, which solidified his public reputation as one of the most culturally visible and transparent figures in non-league football history.

On May 22, 2022, Marc White's side gained promotion from the National League South play-off final after a dramatic game against Ebbsfleet United at Meadowbank where they were nearly seconds away from being eliminated after being 2-1 down when Ebbsfleet scored in the 93rd minute of added time, but a goal from Luke Moore in the 99th minute of added time saved Dorking and then a goal from Alfie Rutherford in the 98th minute of the first extra-time to help Dorking reach the National League for the first team in the club's history. A few days later, White secured a notable cup double by guiding Dorking Wanderers to their first-ever Surrey Senior Cup trophy. Facing Kingstonian in a dramatic final at Meadowbank, the match finished in a 1–1 draw before White's side captured the silverware via a 5–4 penalty shootout victory.

On March 18, 2023, in a National League game against York City, White was sent off in the 16th minute of the game after berating the assistant referee. At the end of the game, he later confronted the match officials at the car park outside the York Community Stadium which resulted in him getting a worse punishment which then resulted in The FA giving him a lengthy eight-game stadium ban. White later on revealed in podcasts that he was hungover from the night before which left him in a bad mood ahead of the game. This is thus far one of his most severe punishments. However, Dorking Wanderers ultimately managed to secure safety in the National League by the third to last game of the season in a 0-0 draw against Gateshead away on April 18, 2023, ensuring their survival in the final weeks of the season despite his absence from the stadium.

In July 2023, White launched the "Rise With Us" campaign, a public equity initiative designed to accelerate the club's development by selling shares directly to the local community. The campaign proved highly successful under White's leadership, expanding the club's corporate framework to include roughly 1,000 distinct public shareholders. White utilized the crowdfunded capital from the scheme to directly bankroll expansions to the Dorking Wanderers youth academy, upgrade training facilities, and fund long-term stadium infrastructure projects at Meadowbank.

Despite managing over 1,000 competitive matches, White has never held formal coaching qualifications or FA coaching badges. When addressing regulations requiring standard UEFA certifications for English Football League managers, White publicly rejected the system, questioning the validity of credentials for a manager with his established promotion record.

Throughout his time in the dugout, White has become famous for his extensive and costly disciplinary record with the Football Association (FA). Because his unfiltered post-match rants and touchline outbursts frequently lead to automatic fines, White has joked in interviews that he has accumulated more suspensions than almost any other modern manager, once noting he had been banned from 12 different stadiums in a single season. Since he completely self-funds the club and answers to no superior board of directors, White has openly stated that the heavy financial penalties from the FA do not change his management style or deter him from speaking his mind. There are notable incidents such as the previously mentioned York City sending off in March 2023. In September 2023, during a National League fixture away against Oldham Athletic, White received a straight red card just 16 minutes into the first half. The dismissal occurred after White kicked a stray ball away on the touchline, which the referee ruled as an intentional action to delay the restart of play. During the halftime interval of a National League South match against Maidenhead United in March 2026, White was sent off following a verbal exchange with the match officials. White, who later clarified he used no abusive language, was dismissed after openly telling the referee that his performance was not up to standard and suggesting he referee at a lower level.

White has gained a prominent public profile for his unconventional, unfiltered post-match press conferences. He frequently draws national media attention for bypassing standard public relations conventions, notably delivering a viral, explicit critique of his squad's performance following a 6-0 defeat to Barnet in March 2024. The most well-known post-match press conference was when White drew widespread national media coverage for an explosive post-match interview following Dorking's shock exit from the FA Cup against at the time, lower-league rivals, Horsham. Bypassing traditional public relations standards, White used the club's official media channel to deliver a furious, expletive-filled assessment of his squad's performance. He openly labeled his own players as "lazy," "arrogant," and "disgraceful," while publicly stating that several members of the team had completely run out of chances under his management. White's raw, unfiltered breakdown went viral across digital sports networks, solidifying his reputation as one of the most outspoken and direct figures in the modern English game. White suffered his first relegation in his managerial career as Dorking Wanderers were relegated from the National League at the end of the 2023–24 season.

On January 18, 2025, White achieved a major career milestone by taking charge of his 1,000th competitive match as manager of Dorking Wanderers during a National League South fixture against Weston-super-Mare. Having co-founded the club in 1999 as an amateur park side in the Crawley & District League, White acted as the sole first-team manager across the entire 1,000-match history. The milestone highlighted his unique longevity in the modern English game, serving concurrently as the club's founder, primary financial benefactor, chairman, and manager over a 27-year tenure.

In June 2025, The FA gave White a six-match touchline ban for a sexist comment about women on a podcast. In September 2025, White and Dorking Wanderers made the headlines when they opted to sign a 54-year-old fan and supporter of Dorking to play as an emergency goalkeeper ahead of a game against AFC Totton due to their first-choice goalkeeper, Harrison Foulkes injuring his spleen the previous game.

In December 2025, White agreed to a unique broadcasting stunt by opening the Dorking Wanderers dressing room to the public for a match against Weston-super-Mare. Working with the Bunch of Amateurs film crew, White let his pre-match, halftime, and full-time team talks be broadcast completely live and unfiltered to a global streaming audience. This was the first time a manager had ever allowed their locker-room team talks to be streamed live at the exact same time a match was being played.

In May 2026, acting in his capacity as majority owner and chairman, White oversaw a major financial restructure at Dorking Wanderers by approving a shareholding sale to a US-based investment consortium. The group was fronted by American entrepreneur James Sixsmith, a former professional ice hockey player turned stock day-trader. White structured the partnership to inject foreign capital into the club to help fund a long-term push toward the Football League, while explicitly retaining his absolute personal control over first-team football operations. As part of the corporate deal negotiated by White, the consortium's UK associate, Daryl Cumberland, was added to the club's senior committee board to act as Sixsmith's day-to-day representative. In that same month, White enacted a significant leadership restructuring within the squad during his official end-of-season evaluation. Following the departure of midfielder and captain Charlie Carter to Sutton United, White made the executive decision to appoint long-serving defender Dan Gallagher as the new club captain. White publicly praised Gallagher's uncompromising leadership style, describing him as a "silent assassin" on the pitch who epitomized the team's identity. Alongside the captaincy change, White initiated a major squad clearance by releasing several senior first-team players—including George Knight and Louie Sullivan—to drastically reshape the team's core for the upcoming campaign.

In June 2026, White finalized a significant expansion of Dorking Wanderers' executive leadership by welcoming Frank Villares and Debra Tucker to the club as Co-Owners and Growth Investors. White, who sat down with the pair for a joint announcement following months of discussions, stated that the additions represented the "final piece of the jigsaw" for the club's administrative framework. He structured the partnership to further professionalize the club's off-pitch operations, strengthen stadium infrastructure, and back his long-term goal of achieving a double-promotion push back up the football pyramid.

In July 2026, White negotiated a long-term principal agreement with the Surrey Football Association to take over the operating head lease of Meadowbank Stadium from the Mole Valley District Council. White structured the deal to give Dorking Wanderers complete operational control over their home ground while retaining the county FA at the facility. He publicly cited the acquisition as a critical step toward unlocking future stadium expansions, securing the club's financial self-sufficiency, and increasing grassroots community access to the pitch.

On October 27, 2026, White received widespread attention after behind-the-scenes footage from the YouTube series Dorking Uncovered by Bunch of Amateurs, showed him flipping a dressing room table twice during an expletive-laden half-time team talk against Hemel Hempstead Town. Trailing 2–1 at the interval, Dorking went on to salvage a 3–3 draw, and the clip drew millions of views online alongside coverage from national sports outlets.

== Personal life ==
Before his career in football and property development, White achieved early success in the corporate sector. By his mid-twenties, he became the youngest corporate sales director for a major blue-chip company in the United Kingdom. White has frequently stated that the leadership and corporate management training he received during this period heavily influenced his later approach to running both the sporting and financial operations of Dorking Wanderers. White made his name as a banker in the City of London before starting a successful marketing business. Growing up as a Wimbledon fan, White became frustrated with the destruction of his club and decided to start his own team instead of watching, founding Dorking Wanderers in 1999.

White is married and has children who were raised within the Surrey area. His long-term family residence in the community served as his primary motivation for investing heavily in local youth development, noting that watching his own children progress through regional grassroots sports inspired him to establish the Dorking Wanderers Academy infrastructure to support local youth athletic pathways.

White suffered a significant personal tragedy in 2010 when his sister, whom he described as fulfilling the role of his mother, father, and sibling combined, passed away in a hospice. White has frequently cited her illness and passing as a major turning point in his adult life, stating that the experience gave him a distinct moment of clarity that heavily reordered his personal values, shifting his focus toward family reconciliation, community engagement, and charitable giving.

== Managerial statistics ==
Team	From	To	Record							
Team	From	To	G	W	D	L	F	A	GD	Win %
Dorking Wanderers	2007–08	Present	830	421	164	245	1,716	1,198	+518	50.72
Total			830	421	164	245	1,716	1,198	+518	50.72

As of 21 November 2026 (competitive matches only)

== See also ==
- List of football managers with the most matches
