= Dorking Wanderers F.C. =

English football club

Coordinates: 51.2345°N 0.3335°W

Dorking Wanderers
- Full name: Dorking Wanderers Football Club
- Nickname: Wanderers
- Founded: 1999
- Ground: Meadowbank, Dorking
- Capacity: 4,000
- Chairman: Marc White
- Manager: Marc White
- League: National League South
- 2025–26: National League South, 4th of 24
- Website: dorkingwanderers.com
Home colours	Away colours

Dorking Wanderers Football Club is a professional football club based in Dorking, Surrey, England. They are currently members of the National League South, the sixth tier of English football, and play at Meadowbank. Formed in 1999 by a group of friends as a recreational amateur team playing grassroots football, the club began life in the Crawley & District League and went on to win twelve promotions in their first 23 seasons, reaching the National League in 2022, where they remained for two seasons before suffering their first-ever relegation. Having played for the club in its earlier years, club founder Marc White continues to be the chairman and first team manager to the present day.

== History ==
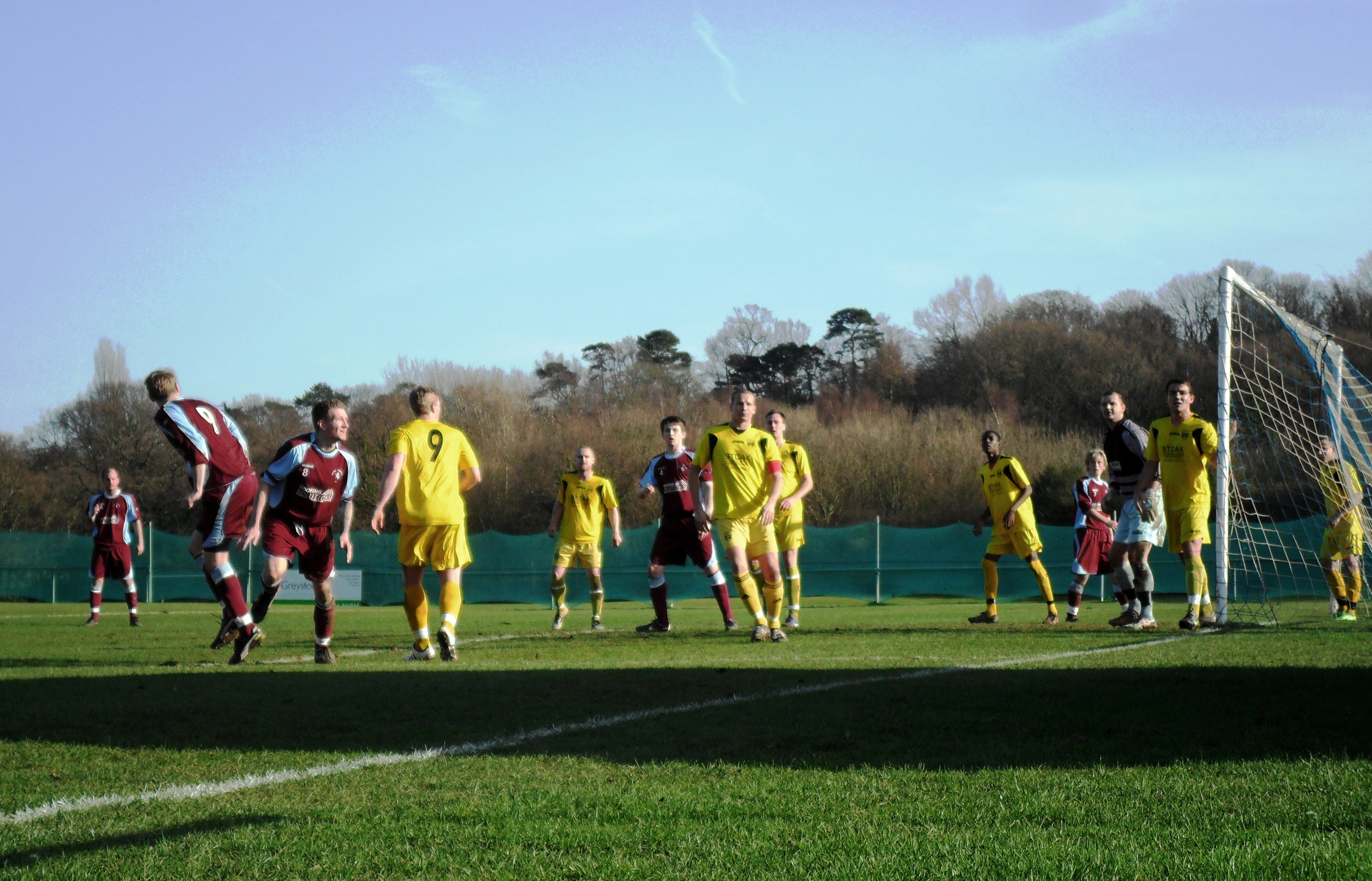
Dorking playing Little Common in the Sussex League Division Two in 2012.

The club was formed in 1999 by businessman Marc White and friends Peter Buckland, Mark Lewington, Ian Davidson, Lee Spickett, and Penny Gregg. White described at the time of the formation of the club he and his friends were season ticket holders at Wimbledon and had become disillusioned with how the club was being run coming to the end of its Premier League tenure. The group decided to do something else with their weekends and so Dorking Wanderers were formed as an amateur recreational team. The club initially played in the Crawley & District League. After their first season in the Crawley League they switched to Division Four of the West Sussex League, winning the division at the first attempt. In 2001–02 the club finished as Division Three runners-up, earning a third consecutive promotion. After winning Division Two in 2003–04 they were promoted to Division One, and a third-place finish in Division One in 2005–06 saw them promoted to the Premier Division.

In 2006–07 Wanderers won the West Sussex League's Premier Division, clinching the title with a victory on the last day of the season. As a result, the club were promoted to Division Three of the Sussex County League. They went on to win Division Three in 2010–11, earning promotion to Division Two. A third-place finish in Division Two the following season was enough to see them promoted to Division One. Although the league initially denied them entry to the division as their ground was not deemed to meet the requirements, the club appealed to the Football Association, who overruled the decision after an independent ground grading visit confirmed that the ground reached the mandatory standards for Division One football. The team initially struggled in Division One, finishing third-from-bottom in 2012–13. However, they finished second in 2014–15, earning promotion to Division One South of the Isthmian League.

In Wanderers' first season in the Isthmian League they finished as runners-up in Division One South, qualifying for the promotion play-offs, going on to lose 2–1 to Faversham Town in the semi-finals. The following season saw them finish second again; in the play-offs they beat Hastings United on penalties in the semi-final after a 1–1 draw, and then won again on penalties against Corinthian-Casuals in the final following a 0–0 draw, earning promotion to the Premier Division. In 2018–19 the club won the Premier Division by a margin of 22 points, earning promotion to the National League South for their first time in history. Following the curtailment of the 2019–20 season due to the COVID-19 pandemic, they were placed seventh in the league table (decided on a points-per-game basis), qualifying for the promotion play-offs. After beating Bath City 2–1 in the quarter-finals, the club lost 3–2 to Weymouth in the semi-finals. The 2020–21 season was made null and void following a vote by member clubs of the National League, with Dorking top of the National League South at the point the season was ended.

In the 2021–22 season Wanderers finished second in the National League South, going on to defeat Ebbsfleet United 3–2 in the play-off final, earning promotion to the National League for the first time in the club's history. They also won the Surrey Senior Cup, beating Kingstonian 5–4 on penalties after the final had ended in a 1–1 draw. The club's second season in the fifth tier saw them finish second-from-bottom of the division, resulting in relegation back to the National League South, the first time they had been relegated. In 2025–26 the club finished fourth in the National League South. In the subsequent play-offs they defeated Maidenhead United 2–0 in the quarter-finals before losing 4–2 to Torquay United in the semi-finals.

=== Season-by-season record ===
Season	Tier	Division	Pld	W	D	L	GF	GA	Pts	Pos
1999–00		Crawley & District League	—N/a							
2000–01	16	West Sussex League Division Four	—N/a							
2001–02	15	West Sussex League Division Three	—N/a							
2002–03	14	West Sussex League Division Two	—N/a							
2003–04	14	West Sussex League Division Two	—N/a							
2004–05	13	West Sussex League Division One	—N/a							
2005–06	13	West Sussex League Division One	—N/a							
2006–07	12	West Sussex League Premier Division	—N/a							
2007–08	11	Sussex County League Division Three	24	12	7	5	58	47	42 (Note: Deducted one point.)	4/13
2008–09	11	Sussex County League Division Three	26	15	2	9	70	45	47	5/14
2009–10	11	Sussex County League Division Three	28	15	6	7	78	44	51	4/15
2010–11	11	Sussex County League Division Three	30	24	2	4	93	35	74	1/16
2011–12	10	Sussex County League Division Two	34	21	6	7	80	48	69	3/18
2012–13	9	Sussex County League Division One	42	10	11	21	62	80	41	20/22
2013–14	9	Sussex County League Division One	38	16	7	15	68	63	55	8/20
2014–15	9	Sussex County League Division One	38	26	5	7	101	51	83	2/20 (Note: Due to the league winner being ineligible for promotion due to stadium requirements. Dorking were promoted in their place.)
2015–16	8	Isthmian League Division One South	46	27	9	10	99	56	90	2/24
2016–17	8	Isthmian League Division One South	46	33	6	7	103	44	105	2/24 (Note: Promoted via play-offs)
2017–18	7	Isthmian League Premier Division	46	16	10	20	77	80	58	14/24
2018–19	7	Isthmian League Premier Division	42	28	9	5	87	31	93	1/22
2019–20	6	National League South	35	14	8	13	58	56	50	7/22
2020–21	6	National League South	18	12	3	3	40	17	39	1/21 (Note: The league was declared null and void on 18 February 2021 due to the COVID-19 pandemic in England. As a result, all records were expunged and no teams were promoted or relegated.)
2021–22	6	National League South	40	25	6	9	101	53	81	2/21
2022–23	5	National League	46	16	9	21	67	91	57	16/24
2023–24	5	National League	46	12	9	25	54	94	45	23/24
2024–25	6	National League South	46	24	14	8	89	54	86	6/24
2025–26	6	National League South	46	23	10	13	78	61	79	4/24

=== Reserve team ===
In 2015 the club's reserve team were promoted from the Suburban League to Division One of the Combined Counties League. However, they left the league at the end of the season as the club were set to groundshare with Dorking during the 2016–17 season. The reserve team rejoined the Combined Counties League at the start of the 2018–19 season. In 2021 they were transferred to Division One of the Southern Combination.

== Ground ==
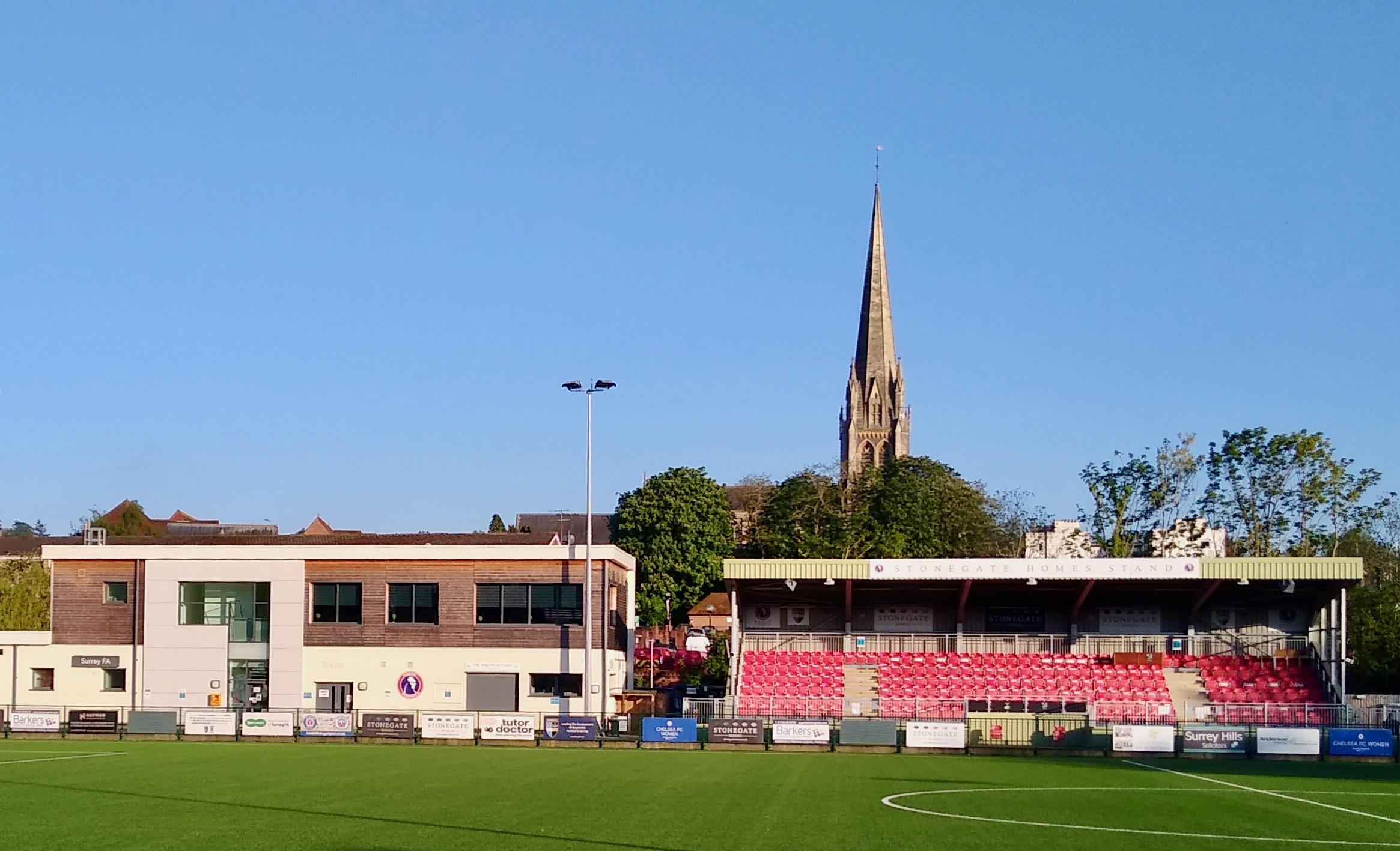
Meadowbank Stadium with the spire of St Martin's Church

The club initially played at Brockham Big Field, before moving to the Westhumble Playing Fields on London Road in 2007. The ground had a small seated stand and covered standing on one side of the pitch, with the remainder being uncovered; Floodlights were installed in 2012. In July 2018 the club relocated to a refurbished Meadowbank ground, which had previously been home to Dorking F.C. prior to their disbanding. Their first game at Meadowbank was a friendly match against Sutton United on 17 July 2018.

Meadowbank had become the home ground of Dorking F.C. in 1953. A 200-seat stand was built on one side of the pitch around 1956, with a covered standing area built on the other. Another covered standing area was installed behind one goal, with the other end left open. However, they were forced to leave the ground in 2013 after it was shut down for failing to meet health and safety requirements. Prior to Dorking Wanderers moving to the ground, it was upgraded to include a 300-seat stand, two covered standing areas and a 3G pitch as it was converted to a community sports facility at a cost of £5m. The Surrey County Football Association also moved their headquarters to Meadowbank when it reopened.

In February 2020 the club announced that planning permission had been granted to upgrade Meadowbank Stadium to grade B status. In July 2020 the stadium passed the grade B status assessment. By September 2020 work had been completed on a new seated stand and a new covered terrace both at the east end of the ground, taking Meadowbank's official capacity to 3,000. In March 2023 an uncovered 1,200-capacity terrace was opened at the west end of the ground.

== Current squad ==
As of 21 November 2026.

Note: Flags indicate national team as defined under FIFA eligibility rules; some limited exceptions apply. Players may hold more than one non-FIFA nationality.

No.	Pos.	Nation	Player
1	GK	ENG	Glenn Morris
2	DF	SCO	Brennan Camp
5	DF	ENG	Isaac Philpot
6	MF	WAL	Harry Pinchard
7	MF	ENG	Jimmy Muitt
9	FW	ENG	George Nikaj
10	FW	ENG	Alfie Rutherford
11	MF	ENG	James McShane
12	MF	ENG	Seb Tauta-Caballero
17	MF	ENG	Josh Taylor
18	FW	ENG	Jack Wood
19	MF	ENG	Harry Forster
20	MF	ENG	Dan Gallagher (captain)

No.	Pos.	Nation	Player
21	DF	ENG	Femi Ilesanmi
22	MF	ENG	Dillon Grass
23	MF	ENG	Theo Widdrington
28	MF	ENG	Fin McIntyre
29	MF	NIR	Dylan Stitt (on loan from Luton Town)
30	FW	POL	Dawid Rogalski
33	MF	ENG	Frank Vincent
34	GK	ENG	Stevie Bausor (on loan from Leicester City)
35	MF	ENG	Kai Enslin (on loan from Charlton Athletic)
37	MF	ENG	George Francomb
39	MF	IRL	Josh Barrett
42	DF	ENG	Sam Hart
46	DF	GIB	Louie Annesley

=== Out on loan ===
Note: Flags indicate national team as defined under FIFA eligibility rules; some limited exceptions apply. Players may hold more than one non-FIFA nationality.

No. / Pos. / Nation / Player; 13 / GK / ENG / Max Foulkes (at South Park until 19 December 2026)	No. / Pos. / Nation / Player; 15 / MF / ENG / Ted Sullivan (at South Park until 1 January 2027)

== Management team ==
Position	Staff
Manager	Marc White
Assistant Manager	Dean Milton
First Team Head Coach	Jordan Clark
First Team Coach	Mick Daniels
First Team Coach	Charlie Dunne
Goalkeeper Coach	Dean Lightwood
Football Analyst	Adam Trathan
Physio & Sports Therapist	Dillon Hall
Senior Consultant Physiotherapist	Paul Hunter
Head of Performance	Jake Foster

Source: F.C.

== Honours ==
- Isthmian League
  - Premier Division champions 2018–19
- Southern Combination
  - Division Three champions 2010–11
- West Sussex League
  - Premier Division champions 2006–07
  - Division Two North champions 2003–04
  - Division Four North champions 2000–01
- Surrey Senior Cup
  - Winners 2021–22

== Records ==
- Best FA Cup performance: Fourth qualifying round, 2021–22, 2022–23, 2023–24, 2025–26
- Best FA Trophy performance: Fifth round, 2022–23
- Best FA Vase performance: Second qualifying round, 2012–13, 2013–14, 2014–15
- Record attendance: 3,732 vs Woking, National League, 7 April 2023

== See also ==
- Dorking Wanderers F.C. players
