= Hailsham Town F.C. =

Association football club in England

Coordinates: 50°51′41.26″N 0°15′08.71″E

Hailsham Town
- Full name: Hailsham Town Football Club
- Nickname: The Stringers
- Founded: 1885
- Ground: The Beaconsfield, Hailsham
- Capacity: 2,000 (100 seated)
- Chairman: Chris Weller
- Manager: Callum Standish
- League: Southern Combination Division Two
- 2024–25: Southern Combination Division Two, 3rd of 13
Home colours	Away colours

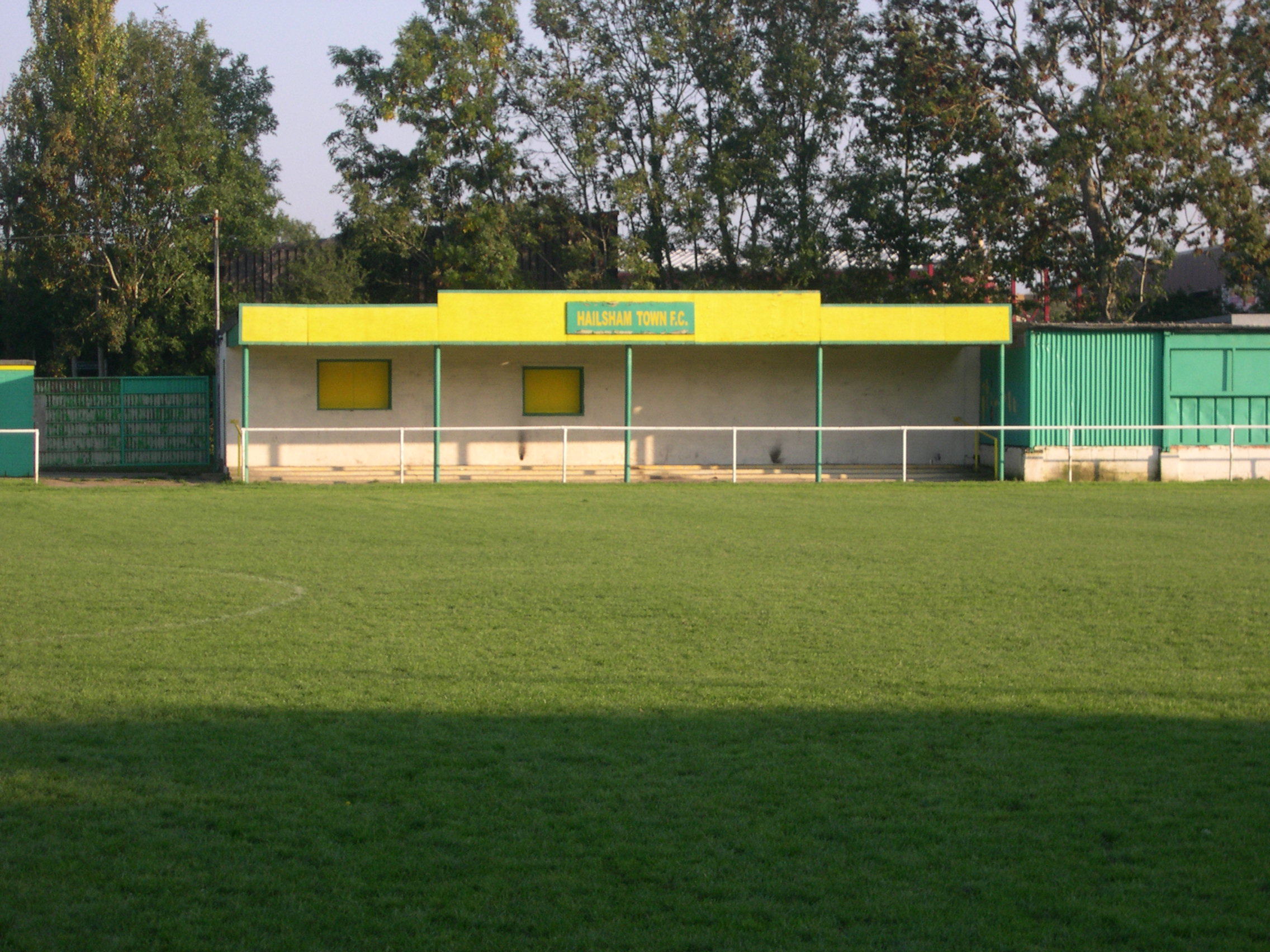
The main stand at The Beaconsfield

Hailsham Town Football Club is a football club based in Hailsham, East Sussex, England. They are currently members of the Southern Combination Division Two and play at the Beaconsfield. The club are known locally as 'The Stringers', a nickname which derives from traditional industry in the town.

== History ==
Established in 1885, Hailsham won the Sussex Junior Cup in the 1895–96 season and went on to be one of the founder members of the East Sussex League in 1896. After finishing bottom of the league for four consecutive seasons between 1901–02 and 1904–05 and then again in 1906–07 and 1907–08, Hailsham left to rejoin the Eastbourne League. In 1912 the club merged with Hailsham Athletic. Rejoining the East Sussex League in 1920, Hailsham finished bottom of the league in 1925–26. Although they were runners-up in 1927–28, they finished bottom of the league again in 1929–30, 1930–31 and 1931–32. The club were runners-up for a second time in 1937–38.

Following World War II Hailsham finished bottom of the table again in 1948–49 and 1950–51, before winning the East Sussex League for the first time in 1953–54, a season which also saw them win the Sussex Intermediate Cup. In 1955 Hailsham joined Division Two of the Sussex County League under the name Hailsham Football Club. They won the Division Two Invitation Cup in their first season, but resigned from the league during the 1962–63 season. They subsequently joined the Eastbourne & District League, before returning to the East Sussex League in 1968, when they joined Division Two.

Hailsham were Division Two champions in their first season back in the East Sussex League, earning promotion to Division One. They went on to win the Division One title at the first attempt. In 1972 the now-renamed Hailsham Town transferred to the Southern Counties Combination. They won the league in 1974–75 and were promoted to Division Two of the Sussex County League. The following season saw them win the Hastings Senior Cup. After finishing as Division Two runners-up in 1980–81 they were promoted to Division One. They won the League Cup in 1994–95 beating Wick 2–1 in the final. The club remained in Division One until being relegated at the end of the 1998–99 season.

Hailsham were promoted back to Division One following a third-placed finish in 2000–01. In 2005–06 they won the Sussex RUR Cup with a 2–0 win over Whitehawk in the final. The club were relegated again in 2010–11, but finished second in Division Two the following season to earn an immediate promotion back to Division One. In 2015 the league was renamed the Southern Combination, with Division One becoming the Premier Division. Hailsham finished bottom of the Premier Division in 2016–17 and were relegated to Division One. In 2022–23 the club finished bottom of Division One, resulting in relegation to Division Two. In 2023–24 they won the Hastings Intermediate Cup, beating Hawkhurst United 4–1 in the final. The 2025–26 season saw them win the Division Two title.

== Honours ==
- Southern Combination
  - Division Two champions 2025–26
  - League Cup winners 1994–95
  - Division Two Invitation Cup winners 1955–56
- Southern Counties Combination
  - Champions 1974–75
- East Sussex League
  - Champions 1953–54, 1969–70
  - Division Two champions 1968–69
- Sussex RUR Cup
  - Winners 2005–06
- Sussex Intermediate Cup
  - Winners 1953–54
- Sussex Junior Cup
  - Winners 1895–96
- Hastings Senior Cup
  - Winners 1975–76
- Hastings Intermediate Cup
  - Winners 2023–24

== Records ==
- Best FA Cup performance: Third qualifying round, 1989–90, 1990–91
- Best FA Vase performance: Fifth round, 1988–89
- Record attendance: 1,350 vs Hungerford Town, FA Vase fifth round, 1989
- Most appearances: Phil Comber, 713
- Most goals: Howard Stevens, 51

== See also ==
- Hailsham Town F.C. players
