= Bexhill United F.C. =

Association football club in England

Coordinates: 50.8373°N 0.4613°E

Bexhill United
- Full name: Bexhill United Football Club
- Nickname: The Pirates
- Founded: 2002
- Ground: The Polegrove, Bexhill-on-Sea
- Chairman: Graham Cox
- Manager: Jay Skinner-Swain
- League: Southern Combination Premier Division
- 2025–26: Southern Combination Premier Division, 9th of 20
- Website: http://bexhillunited.com/
Home colours	Away colours

Bexhill United is a football club based in Bexhill-on-Sea, East Sussex, England. The club was formed in 2002 through the merger of Bexhill Town and Bexhill Amateur Athletic Club, though the latter split from the club in 2006. Affiliated to the Sussex County Football Association, they are currently members of the Southern Combination Premier Division and play at the Polegrove.

== History ==
=== Bexhill Town ===
Bexhill Football Club was formed in May 1927 through the amalgamation of East Sussex League clubs Bexhill Town and Bexhill United. The new club was admitted into the Sussex County league for the 1927–28 season alongside Bognor and Haywards Heath, taking the places of Shoreham, Hastings & St Leonards and Allen West from Brighton. In 1946 the club was renamed Bexhill Town and became a sister club to Bexhill Amateur Athletic Club.

In 1950 the club changed its name to Bexhill Town Athletic after merging with Bexhill Amateur Athletic Club. They won the league cup in 1955-56, and the following season saw them win their first Sussex County League title. In 1957-58 they finished as runners-up and won the Sussex Royal Ulster Rifles Charity Cup. The club would go on to win back-to-back league titles in 1965–66 and 1966–67 before finishing as runners-up in 1967–68.

In 1969 the club split from Bexhill Amateur Athletic Club and changed their name to Bexhill Town. They then spent the next twelve seasons in Division One, winning the RUR Cup for a second time in 1973–74, before being relegated to Division Two at the end of the 1980–81 season, in which they finished bottom of the table. They were relegated again after finishing bottom of Division Two in 1984–85, but were promoted from Division Three at the first attempt as runners-up in the 1985–86 season. After winning Division Two in 1989–90, the club returned to Division One. However, the club were relegated to Division Two again at the end of the 1993–94 season and then to Division Three at the end of the 1997–98 season after finishing bottom of Division Two. In 1999–2000 they won the Division Three Cup.

In 2002 the club merged with Bexhill Amateur Athletic Club again and changed their name to Bexhill United.

=== Bexhill United ===
In 2004–05 the new club finished as runners-up in Division Three, earning promotion to Division Two. However the following season saw the club finish bottom of the table, after which they were relegated back to Division Three. The two clubs de-merged again in 2005, but Bexhill United retained their name.

In 2007–08 Bexhill finished as runners-up in Division Three, earning promotion back to Division Two. They also won both the Division Three Challenge Cup and the Sussex Intermediate Cup. Although they were relegated back to Division Three at the end of the following season, they returned to Division Two again after finishing as runners-up in Division Three in 2009–10. In 2011–12 they won the Hastings Senior Cup with a 4–3 win over Sidley United. In 2015 the league was renamed the Southern Combination, with Division Two becoming Division One. In 2021 they were promoted to the Premier Division based on their results in the abandoned 2019–20 and 2020–21 seasons.

== Ground ==
Bexhill United play their home games at the Polegrove on Brockley Road. The ground features a mock Tudor grandstand built in 1929. The club share the ground with Bexhill Cricket Club, though the two clubs have separate clubhouses and changing facilities. The groundshare means that the club cannot play home games during the cricket season.

== Honours ==
- Southern Combination
  - Champions 1956–57, 1965–66, 1966–67
  - Division Two champions 1989–90
  - John O'Hara League Cup winners 1955–56
  - Division Three Cup winners 1999–2000, 2007–08
- Sussex RUR Cup
  - Winners 1957–58, 1973–74
- Hastings Senior Cup
  - Winners 2011–12
- Sussex Intermediate Cup
  - Winners 2007–08

== Records ==
- Highest league position: 1st in the Sussex County League Division One, 1956–57, 1965–66, 1966–67
- Best FA Cup performance: Second qualifying round, 1946–47, 1948–49, 1962–63, 1966–67, 1967–68, 1970–71, 1972–73, 1976–77
- Best FA Vase performance: Fourth round, 1976–77

== See also ==
- Bexhill United F.C. players
