= Worthing United F.C. =

Association football club in England

Coordinates: 50°50′15.59″N 0°22′03.30″W

Worthing United
- Full name: Worthing United Football Club
- Nickname: The Mavericks
- Founded: 1988
- Ground: Robert Albon Memorial Ground, Worthing
- Chairman: Mark Sanderson
- Manager: Mark Curram & Glen Souter
- League: Southern Combination Division One
- 2025–26: Southern Combination Division One, 4th of 18
Home colours	Away colours

Worthing United Football Club is a football club based in Worthing, England. Established in 1988 by a merger of Wigmore Athletic and Southdown, they are currently members of the Southern Combination Division One and play at the Robert Albon Memorial Ground.

== History ==
Wigmore Athletic joined the Sussex County League in 1952 as founder members of Division Two. They won the division at the first attempt, earning promotion to Division One. The club finished second-from-bottom of Division One for three consecutive seasons between 1954–55 and 1956–57, but avoided relegation. In 1959–60 they won the league's Invitation Cup. After finishing bottom of Division One in 1965–66 the club were relegated to Division Two.

Wigmore were Division Two runners-up in 1967–68 and were promoted back to Division One, also winning the Division Two Cup. However, they finished bottom of Division One again the following season and were relegated to Division Two. In 1973–74 the club were Division One champions, resulting in promotion back to Division One. They finished third in Division One the following season, their highest-ever league finish, as well as winning the John O'Hara League Challenge Cup. However, they were relegated back to Division Two at the end of the 1977–78 season after a last-placed finish. After finishing second-from-bottom of Division Two in 1987–88 and being relegated to Division Three the club merged with Southdown to form Worthing United.

Worthing United were Division Three champions in 1989–90, resulting in promotion to Division Two. The club remained in Division Two until finishing as runners-up in 2003–04, after which they were promoted to Division One. After finishing bottom of Division One in 2008–09 they were relegated back to Division Two. A third-place finish in Division Two in 2010–11 saw them return to Division One. After finishing bottom of Division One by avoiding relegation in 2012–13, they finished last again the following season and were relegated back to Division Two.

The 2014–15 season saw Worthing United win both the Division Two Cup and the Division Two title, earning promotion to the renamed Southern Combination Premier Division. In August 2015 two of the club's players, Matthew Grimstone and Jacob Schilt, were among those killed when an aircraft crashed on the A27 road near Shoreham Airport. They were driving to the Robert Albon Memorial ground to participate in a match against Loxwood, which was consequently called off. The club were relegated to Division One at the end of the 2017–18 season after finishing second-from-bottom of the Premier Division. In 2023–24 they finished fifth in Division One, qualifying for the promotion play-offs, in which they were defeated on penalties by Wick in the semi-finals.

The 2025–26 season saw Worthing finish fourth in Division One, going on to lose 2–0 to Billingshurst in the play-off semi-finals.

== Ground ==
Worthing United play their home games at the Robert Albon Memorial Ground on Lyons Way in the Broadwater area of Worthing. The ground was named for young player Robert Albon after his death. A small stand on one side of the pitch had bench seating until around 50 individual seats were added to it in 2004, raising its capacity to 120. Floodlights were installed in 2004 prior to the club's promotion to Division One. Both ends of the ground consist of grass banks.

A new stand was opened in 2017 and named for Grimstone and Schilt.

== Honours ==
- Sussex County League
  - Division Two champions 1952–53, 1973–74, 2014–15
  - Division Three champions 1989–90
  - Invitation Cup winners 1959–60
  - John O'Hara League Challenge Cup winners 1974–75
  - Division Two Cup winners 1967–68, 2014–15

== Records ==
- Best FA Cup performance: Third qualifying round, 2006–07
- Best FA Vase performance: Third round, 1991–92

== See also ==
- Worthing United F.C. managers
