= Loxwood F.C. =

Association football club in England

Coordinates: 51°3′42.253″N 0°31′7.723″W

Loxwood
- Full name: Loxwood Football Club
- Nickname: The Magpies
- Founded: 1920
- Ground: The Nest Recreation Ground, Loxwood
- Chairman: Mark Lacey
- Manager: Ian Matthews
- League: Southern Combination Division One
- 2025–26: Southern Combination Division One, 16th of 18
- Website: loxwoodfootballclub.co.uk
Home colours	Away colours

Loxwood Football Club is a football club based in Loxwood, West Sussex, England. Nicknamed "The Magpies" and affiliated to the Sussex County FA, they are currently members of the Southern Combination Division One and play at the Recreation Ground.

== History ==
The club was originally established in 1920. As Loxwood United they won the West Sussex League's Tony Kopp Cup in 1976–77. As Loxwood, they won the cup again in 1987–88 and were Division Two North champions the following season. Although the club subsequently folded, they reformed in 1997 and rejoined the West Sussex League, entering Division Five West. The club won the division in 1998–99 and were promoted to Division Four Central, which they won the following season. After being promoted from Division Three in 2000–01, the club were Division Two North champions in 2001–02.

Loxwood won the league's Centenary Cup in 2003–04 and retained it the following season, also winning the Malcolm Simmonds Memorial Cup. In 2006 they moved up to Division Three of the Sussex County League. They won Division Three in 2007–08, earning promotion to Division Two. In 2011–12 the club finished fifth and were set to be promoted due to third-place Dorking Wanderers failing ground grading requirements; however, the decision was overturned by the Football Association and Dorking were promoted. A third-place finish in Division Two in 2013–14 saw Loxwood promoted to Division One. In 2015 the league was renamed the Southern Combination, with Division One becoming the Premier Division.

In 2024–25 Loxwood finished second-from-bottom of the Premier Division and were relegated to Division One.

== Ground ==
The club play at the Recreation Ground on Plaistow Road. A new stand was built in 2008 and opened by Jimmy Hill prior to a friendly match against Corinthian-Casuals on 2 August. Floodlights were erected in 2010 and inaugurated with a friendly match against Crawley Town on 23 November. A 100-seat stand was also installed.

== Honours ==
- Southern Combination
  - Division Three champions 2007–08
- West Sussex League
  - Division Two North champions 1988–89, 2001–02
  - Division Four Central champions 1994–95, 1999–2000
  - Division Five West champions 1998–99
  - Centenary Cup winners 2003–04, 2004–05
  - Malcolm Simmonds Memorial Cup winners 2004–05
  - Tony Kopp Cup winners 1976–77, 1987–88

== Records ==
- Best FA Cup performance: Preliminary round, 2016–17, 2017–18, 2024–25
- Best FA Vase performance: Second round, 2014–15, 2015–16

== Staff ==
Position In Club	Name
First Team Manager	Ian Matthews
First Team Assistant Manager	Graham Shergold
First Team Head Coach	Vacant
First Team Coach	Zac Massey
First Team Physio	Ciaran Kane
Chairman	Mark Lacey
Director of Football	Dean 'Dixie' Laker
U18 Manager	Colin Ramsay

== See also ==
- Loxwood F.C. players
- Loxwood F.C. managers
