= Littlehampton United F.C. =

Association football club in England

Littlehampton United
- Full name: Littlehampton United Football Club
- Founded: 1947
- Dissolved: 2022
- Ground: Sportsfield, Littlehampton
Home colours	Away colours

Littlehampton United Football Club was a football club that were based in Clymping, near Littlehampton in England. The club is affiliated to the Sussex County Football Association. They played at the Sportsfield, home of Littlehampton Town. The club was known as Clymping F.C. until a change of name prior to the 2018–19 season.

== History ==
The club was formed in 1947 and originally played in the Littlehampton and District League before joining several seasons later the West Sussex Football League. The club moved up the divisions of the West Sussex Football League divisions, and under manager Dominic Di Paola at the end of the 2007–08 campaign after finishing as Runners-up in the Premier Division, were promoted to Division Three of the Sussex County Football League.

Their first season in the Sussex County Football League saw them become champions of Division Three, and gain promotion to Division two. After finishing sixth at their first season in Division two, manager Dominic Di Paola left to join Worthing United, and the club appointed Darren Prior as his replacement. After the departure of Di Paola the club finished bottom of Division Two and were relegated back to Division Three. The club have since remained in Division Three, renamed Division Two in 2016. The 19/20 season was unfortunately Null & Void due to the worldwide Coronavirus pandemic. Season 21/22 was able to start but was halted in December 2021 with cases reaching an all-time high. Littlehampton sat 10th in the league before another vote of Null & Void saw the season end in February despite the Government and FA extending grass roots until June 29 and football returning as of March 29, 2021.

In March 2021 Littlehampton United appointed former East Preston manager Christopher Horner as the 1st team manager for the 21/22 season The club grew in stature with the emergence of a new U23 side to play in the SCFLU23 West league.

In May 2021 Littlehampton United announced a new ground share with East Preston FC to house the 1st and the new u23 side for the 2021–2022 season.

Littlehampton United were moved to Southern Combination Division 1. However, the club withdrew and merged with East Preston.

== Ground ==
The Lashamr, Lashmar Road, East Preston, BN16 1ES

== Honours ==
=== League honours ===
- Sussex County Football League Division Three
  - Champions (1): 2008–09
- West Sussex Football League Premier Division:
  - Runners-up (1): 2007–08
- West Sussex Football League Division Two South:
  - Champions (2): 1997–98, 2001–02
- West Sussex Football League Division Three South:
  - Champions (1): 1992–93
- West Sussex Football League Division Four South:
  - Champions (1): 1990–91
- West Sussex Football League Division Five South:
  - Champions (1): 1972–73

=== Cup honours ===
- Vernon Wentworth Cup:
  - Winners (1): 2008–09
- West Sussex Football League Centenary Cup:
  - Runners-up (1): 2007–08
- West Sussex Football League Malcolm Simmonds:
  - Winners (2): 2003–04, 2007–08
- West Sussex Football League Division Three Charity Cup Winners:
  - Winners (1): 1972–73
- West Sussex Football League Division Four Charity Cup Winners:
  - Winners (1): 1971–72

== Records ==
- Highest League Position: 6th in Sussex County Football League 2009–10
