= Lancing F.C. =

English football club

Coordinates: 50°49′47.36″N 0°19′26.99″W

Lancing
- Full name: Lancing Football Club
- Nickname: The Lancers
- Founded: 1941
- Ground: Culver Road, Lancing
- Chairman: Steven Reynolds
- Manager: Dale Hurley and James Rhodes
- League: Southern Combination Premier Division
- 2025–26: Southern Combination Premier Division, 19th of 20
- Website: lancingfc.co.uk
Home colours	Away colours

Lancing Football Club is a football club based in Lancing, West Sussex, England. They are members of the Southern Combination Premier Division and play at Culver Road.

== History ==
The club was established in 1941, initially as a multi-sport club under the name Lancing Athletic. They joined the Brighton, Hove & District League in 1946 and went on to win the Division One and League Cup double in their first season. The club applied to join the Sussex County League, but were rejected. However, after retaining the Brighton, Hove & District League title in 1947–48, the club were then admitted to the Sussex County League, at which point they became a separate organisation to the remainder of the sports club. They were Sussex County League runners-up in 1949–50, only missing out on the title on goal average. When the league gained a second division in 1952 the club became members of Division One, but were relegated to Division Two after finishing bottom of the table in 1956–57.

In 1957 the club dropped Athletic from their name. They were Division Two champions at the first attempt, earning promotion back to Division One. The club won the League Cup in 1964–65, beating Chichester City 2–0 in the final, and went on to win the Sussex RUR Cup the following season with a 3–0 win over Rye United. However, they were relegated again at the end of the 1967–68. Although the club won the Division Two title in 1969–70 and were promoted back to Division One, two seasons later they were relegated back to Division Two after finishing bottom of Division One. The club won the Division Two Cup in 1981–82.

Lancing remained in Division Two until a second-place finish in 1982–83 saw them promoted to Division One. They were relegated again at the end of the 1989–90 season and spent the next ten seasons in Division Two, winning the Division Two Cup again in 1992–93, before earning promotion with a third-place finish in 1999–2000. However, the club were relegated back to Division Two at the end of the following season. In 2010–11 they were Division Two runners-up, earning promotion to Division One. In 2015 the league was renamed the Southern Combination, with Division One becoming the Premier Division. At the end of the 2020–21 season the club were promoted to the South East Division of the Isthmian League based on their performances over the two previous seasons, which had been abandoned due to the COVID-19 pandemic. The 2024–25 season saw the club finish bottom of the South East Division, resulting in relegation back to the Premier Division of the Southern Combination..

== Ground ==
The club initially played at the Crowshaw Recreation Ground, before moving to Culver Road in 1952. A 350-seat stand was built by the following year. In 1981 the ground was bought by the Sussex County Football Association and floodlights were installed.

== Honours ==
- Southern Combination
  - Division Two champions 1957–58, 1969–70
  - Division Two Cup 1981–82, 1992–93
  - League Cup winners 1964–65
  - Peter Bentley Cup winners 2015–16
- Brighton, Hove & District League
  - Division One champions 1946–47, 1947–48
  - League Cup winners 1946–47
- Sussex RUR Cup
  - Winners 1965–66
- Sussex Shield
  - Winners 2021

== Records ==
- Best FA Cup performance: Fourth qualifying round, 1952–53
- Best FA Trophy performance: Second qualifying round, 2021–22, 2023–24
- Best FA Vase performance: Fourth round, 2010–11, 2020–21

== See also ==
- Lancing F.C. players
- Lancing F.C. managers
