= Wick F.C. =

Association football club in England

Wick
- Full name: Wick Football Club
- Nicknames: The Wickers, the dragons
- Founded: 1892 (Re-established in 2016)
- Ground: Nyewood Lane, Bognor Regis
- Capacity: 4,500 (367 seated)
- Coordinates: 50°47′13″N 0°41′25″W
- Chairman: David Phillips
- Manager: Lee Baldwin
- League: Southern Combination Premier Division
- 2025–26: Southern Combination Premier Division, 13th of 20
- Website: https://www.pitchero.com/clubs/wickfc
| Home colours | Away colours |

Wick Football Club is a football club based in Wick, near Littlehampton, England. Wick joined the Sussex County League Division Two in 1964. In the 1998–99 season, they reached the 4th round of the FA Vase. Prior to the 2013–14 season, they merged with near neighbours Barnham. However the clubs split again in 2016, reverting to Wick FC and are currently members of the Southern Combination Premier Division.

== History ==
Wick became founding members of the West Sussex Football League in 1896, joining the Junior Division.

Wick joined Division Two of the Sussex County League in 1964–65 and then spent the next eighteen seasons in Division Two, eventually winning promotion in 1983 after finishing as champions. In the 1975/76 season they reached the RUR Cup final (despite being a Sussex County League Two side) losing 2–0 to Haywards Heath. They then spent three seasons in Division One before being relegated, but bounced back the following season (1985–86) after winning Division Two for a second time.

From then until the end of the 2002–03 season, Wick were ever-present in Division One of the County League, winning the League Challenge Cup in 1987–88.

In 1989–90 they lifted the Division One title, as well as the RUR Charity Cup. In 1992–93 they won the Sussex Senior Cup for the only time, beating Oakwood at the Goldstone Ground, 3–1. The 1993–94 season they won the championship for the second time, finishing 14 points clear of runners-up Whitehawk.

The league cup was won in the 1996–97 season and finished runners-up to Burgess Hill Town. The following season under manager Jimmy Quinn, Wick finished third in the League, but reached the semi-finals of the Senior Cup, and won the RUR charity Cup, which they retained in the following 1998–99 season.

In 2000–01, the club finish third, but two seasons later in the 2002–03 campaign the club was relegated to Division Two.

The club finished as runners-up to Crowborough Athletic in 2004–05 to move back into the top division of the Sussex league.

Carl Stabler joined as manager in 2006–07 with the remit of rising Wick Football Club out of the County League and after 3 seasons stepped up to chairman and handed over the reins of the football side of the club to manager Vic Short.

Prior to the 2013–14 season, they merged with near neighbours Barnham and to become members of the Southern Combination Football League Premier Division.

However, the clubs split again at the end of the 2015–16 season, with Wick taking the place of the first team in the Southern Combination Football League Premier Division. The following season saw them relegated to Division One for the 2017–18 season.

Following 6 years in the Southern Combination Football League Division 1 the club were promoted back to the Premier Division following a successful season finishing 4th, earning them a spot in the playoffs. Wick defeated Worthing United F.C. on penalties in the semifinal before overcoming Seaford Town F.C. on penalties in the final earning them a spot in the Premier Division for the 2024-25 season.

== Ground ==
Wick play their games at Coombsfield (Capacity 1,240), Coombs Way, Wick, Littlehampton, West Sussex BN17 7LS. In the 2025/26 season they will be ground sharing with Bognor Regis Town at their Nyewood Lane Stadium while Crabtree Park is being redeveloped.

== Honours ==
=== League honours ===
- Sussex County League Division One
  - Winners (2): 1989–90, 1993–94
  - Runners Up (1): 1996–97
- Sussex County League Division Two
  - Winners (2): 1981–82, 1985–86
  - Runners Up (1): 2004–05

=== Cup honours ===
- Sussex Senior Challenge Cup
  - Winners (1): 1992–93
- The John O'Hara League Challenge Cup
  - Winners (1): 1987–88, 1996–97
  - Runners Up (2): 1994–95, 1995–96
- The Sussex Royal Ulster Rifles Charity Cup
  - Winners (3): 1989–90, 1997–98, 1998–99
  - Runners Up (2): 1975–76, 2009–10
- Sussex County Football Association Floodlight Cup
  - Runners Up (2): 1994–95, 1996–97
- Sussex County League Division Two Cup
  - Runners Up (1): 1981–82

== Club records ==
- Highest League Position: 1st in Sussex County League Division One: 1989–90, 1993–94
- FA Cup best performance: Second Qualifying Round: 1981–82
- FA Vase best performance: Fourth Round: 1998–99
- Highest Attendance: 1500 vs Godalaming Town FC: 2022/23

== Former coaches ==
1. Managers/Coaches that have played/managed in the football league or any foreign equivalent to this level (i.e. fully professional league).
2. Managers/Coaches with full international caps.
- (United States) Carmelo D'Anzi
