= West Sussex Football League =

Association football league in England

- Country: England
- Divisions: 7
- Number of clubs: 70
- Feeder to: Southern Combination Football League
- Promotion to: Southern Combination Football League Division Two
- Current champions: Delunited (2025–26)

The West Sussex Football League is a football competition in England, formed in 1896.

It comprises 70 teams across seven divisions, of which the highest, the Premier Division, is a feeder to the Southern Combination League Division Two.

Membership is not limited to clubs from West Sussex, with the league also including teams from neighbouring Surrey and Hampshire, although these are from places that are close to the county boundaries.

== Cup competitions ==
The West Sussex Football League operates one pre-season opener, three league cups and three charity cup competitions.

== Walter Rossiter Memorial Trophy ==
The pre-season curtain-raiser is the Walter Rossiter Trophy which is contested between the previous season's Premier Division champions and Centenary Cup winners. The current holder is Barns Green.

== League cups ==
The league's main cup is the Centenary Cup which includes teams from the league's top three tiers - Premier Division, Championship and Division One. The current holders are Boys Club Old Boys.

The league's two other cups are the Tony Kopp Cup for the Northern section of Divisions Two and Three and the Bareham Trophy for the Southern and Central sections of the same divisions. The current holders of the Tony Kopp Cup is Holbrook Olympic Reserves, with AFC Fernhurst current holders of the Bareham Trophy.

== Charity cups ==
The remaining competitions within the league are the charity cups, these operate laterally across the northern and southern section of each division. These cups are:

Competition	Qualifying Divisions	2022-23 Winners
Malcolm Simmonds Memorial Cup	Premier Division, Championship	Barnham Trojans
Chichester Charity Cup	Division One, Division Two North and South	Del United
Division Three Charity Cup	Division Three North, Central and South	Ferring Reserves

== 2026–27 members ==
=== Premier Division ===
- Billingshurst Reserves
- Capel
- Delunited
- Emsworth Town
- Horsham Crusaders
- Selsey Reserves
- Slinfold
- Stedham United
- TD Shipley Reserves
- Watersfield
- Wittering United

=== Division One North ===
- Ashington Rovers
- Ashurst United
- Billingshurst Thirds
- Cowfold
- Holbrook Olympic
- Horsham Crusaders Reserves
- Southwater Reserves
- Southwater Royals
- Westcott (1935)
- Wisborough Green

=== Division One South ===
- East Preston Reserves
- Flansham Park Rangers
- Goring by Sea Cricket
- Hunston Community Club
- Loxwood Reserves
- Midhurst & Easebourne Community
- Newtown Villa
- Petworth
- Rustington Reserves
- Wittering United Reserves

=== Division Two North ===
- Brockham
- Ewhurst
- Henfield
- Horsham Crusaders Town
- Horsham Trinity
- Loxwood Development
- Slinfold Reserves
- Southwater Royals Reserves
- Upper Beeding Reserves
- West Chiltington

=== Division Two South ===
- Bognor Rovers
- Chichester Athletic
- East Dean
- Fittleworth
- Hunston Community Club Reserves
- Lavant
- Milland
- Worthing Town Reserves
- Yapton

=== Division Three North ===
- Barns Green
- Capel Reserves
- Cowfold Reserves
- Holbrook Olympic Reserves
- Horsham Crusaders Athletic
- Horsham Trinity 1882
- Pulborough
- Southwater Thirds
- TD Shipley Thirds
- Watersfield Reserves

=== Division Three South ===
- Beaumont Park
- Bosham Reserves
- Bracklesham Bay
- Fittleworth Reserves
- Hunston Community Club Thirds
- Optimus
- Petworth Reserves
- Stedham United Reserves
- Sussex Rangers
- Yapton Reserves

== Past Divisional Champions ==
The league ran eleven divisions up until 2015 when Division 5 Central was dropped. In 2016, Division One was split into North and South to increase back to eleven divisions.

In 2023/24 the Championship South was dropped and Division One was brought back in. Division Four was also dropped and Division Three Central was introduced, with the following season seeing the second tier split into two divisions, whilst Division Two and Division Three remained split into two and three divisions respectively.

Season	Premier Division	Division One	Division One North	Division One South	Division Two North	Division Two South	Division Three North	Division Three South	Division Four North	Division Four South	Division Five North	Division Five Central	Division Five South
2012/13	Cowfold	Wittering United			Ockley	Newtown Villa Reserves	AFC Roffey Club Reserves	The Vardar VIP	Border Wanderers	Hammer United	Faygate United Thirds	FC Amberley	The Crown
2013/14	Bosham	Predators			AFC Roffey Club Reserves	Stedham United	Horsham Trinity	Angmering Seniors	FC Amberley	Coal Exchange	Capel Reserves	West Chiltington Reserves	The Unicorn
2014/15	Ockley	Petworth			Wisborough Green	Newtown Villa Reserves	Ewhurst	The Crown	Capel	Ajax Trees	Border Wanderers Reserves	Watersfield	Worthing Borough
2015/16	Lancing United	Hunston Community Club			Ashington Rovers	Angmering Seniors	Horsham Crusaders	Worthing Borough	Thakeham Village	Elmer	Ewhurst Reserves		Tangmere
2016/17	Nyetimber Pirates		Ashington Rover	Angmering Seniors	Border Wanderers	The Unicorn	Westcott 1935	Nyetimber Pirates Reserves	Rowfant Village	Watersfield	Capel Reserves		Lancing United Thirds
2017/18	Nyetimber Pirates		Capel	Angmering	Westcott 1935	Lavant Reserves	Horley AFC	Yapton Reserves	Southwater Royals	Boxgrove	Brockham		Del United
2018/19	West Chiltington		Steyning Town Reserves	Nyetimber Pirates Reserves	Cowfold Reserves	Watersfield	Southwater Royals	Barnham Trojans	TD Shipley Reserves	Fernhurst Sports	Slinfold Reserves		The Unicorn Reserves
2019/20	Season abandoned												
2020/21	Season abandoned												
Season	Premier Division	Championship	Championship South	Division Two North	Division Two South	Division Three North	Division Three South	Division Four North	Division Four South	Division Four Central			
2021/22	Capel	Barns Green	Fishbourne	Henfield	Lavant Reserves	Holbrook	Barnham Trojans Reserves	Barns Green Reserves	Goring by Sea Cricket	Rudgwick 3rds			
2022/23	Barns Green	Felpham Colts	TD Shipley	Holbrook Olympic	Barnham Trojans Reserves	Horsham Crusaders AFC	Ferring Reserves	Ashurst United					
Season	Premier Division	Championship	Division One	Division Two North	Division Two South	Division Three North	Division Three South	Division Three Central					
2023/24	Lavant	Wisborough Green	Holbrook Olympic	Billingshurst Thirds	Ferring Reserves	Westcott (1935)	Selsey Reserves	Watersfield Reserves					
Season	Premier Division	Division One North	Division One South	Division Two North	Division Two South	Division Three North	Division Three South	Division Three Central					
2024/25	Watersfield	Holbrook Olympic	Angmering	Cowfold	Boys Club Old Boys	Henfield	Fittleworth	Partridge Green					
