= 2016–17 Southern Combination Football League =

The 2016–17 Southern Combination Football League season was the 92nd in the history of the competition, which lies at levels 9 and 10 of the English football league system.

== Premier Division ==
Southern Combination Premier Division
- Season: 2016–17
- Champions: Shoreham
- Promoted: Shoreham
- Relegated: Wick; Hailsham Town
- Matches: 380
- Goals: 1,470 (3.87 per match)

Premier Division featured 17 clubs which competed in the division last season, along with three new clubs:

- Crawley Down Gatwick, promoted from Division One
- Haywards Heath Town, promoted from Division One
- Peacehaven & Telscombe, relegated from the Isthmian League

Also, Wick & Barnham reverted to their original name of Wick.

Haywards Heath Town, Horsham YMCA, Pagham and Shoreham applied for promotion to Step 4 for 2017–18. While Haywards Heath Town won the league, they were subsequently charged by the FA for playing a suspended player. On 22 May, it was announced that Haywards Heath had 9 points deducted, which would hand the title and promotion to Shoreham. Haywards Heath's appeal was ultimately dismissed on 15 June, therefore Shoreham's championship and promotion were confirmed.

=== League table ===
Pos	Team	Pld	W	D	L	GF	GA	GD	Pts	Promotion or relegation
1	Shoreham	38	30	2	6	110	30	+80	92	Promoted to the Isthmian League South Division
2	Haywards Heath Town	38	31	3	4	114	28	+86	87 (Note: Haywards Heath Town were deducted nine points for fielding an ineligible player.)	
3	Chichester City	38	26	6	6	94	47	+47	84	
4	Pagham	38	22	6	10	93	45	+48	72	
5	Eastbourne Town	38	21	7	10	85	60	+25	70	
6	Loxwood	38	18	7	13	75	59	+16	61	
7	Eastbourne United	38	19	2	17	64	67	−3	59	
8	Broadbridge Heath	38	18	3	17	71	63	+8	57	
9	Newhaven	38	15	10	13	85	70	+15	55	
10	Horsham YMCA	38	15	9	14	67	67	0	54	
11	Crawley Down Gatwick	38	15	7	16	95	86	+9	52	
12	Lancing	38	15	5	18	74	83	−9	50	
13	Hassocks	38	15	3	20	70	68	+2	48	
14	Peacehaven & Telscombe	38	14	6	18	69	78	−9	48	
15	Arundel	38	12	6	20	57	84	−27	42	
16	Littlehampton Town	38	12	4	22	61	87	−26	40	
17	Worthing United	38	11	4	23	52	104	−52	37	
18	AFC Uckfield Town	38	11	2	25	49	95	−46	35 (Note: AFC Uckfield Town were reprieved from relegation.)	
19	Wick	38	8	6	24	53	91	−38	30	Relegated to Division One
20	Hailsham Town	38	2	2	34	32	158	−126	8	Relegated to Division One

Source: scfl.org.uk
Rules for classification: 1) points; 2) goal difference; 3) number of goals scored.

=== Results table ===
Home \ Away	UCK	ARU	BBH	CCH	CDG	EBT	EBU	HAI	HSK	HHE	HYM	LAN	LIT	LOX	NEW	PAG	PAT	SHO	WIC	WRU
AFC Uckfield Town		3–5	0–4	1–2	4–2	1–3	3–0	2–0	3–1	0–3	2–3	1–2	2–0	1–6	1–3	4–2	2–3	0–5	1–2	3–0
Arundel	3–2		1–2	0–1	2–2	1–3	3–0	1–0	1–1	0–4	1–1	3–3	4–2	0–3	2–0	1–3	2–1	1–0	1–1	3–5
Broadbridge Heath	1–3	3–1		1–3	1–2	1–0	1–0	4–0	1–0	1–0	0–2	1–2	4–3	4–1	4–1	1–4	4–0	0–2	3–1	1–2
Chichester City	1–0	4–1	4–3		2–2	2–1	2–0	6–1	4–2	1–1	2–1	1–2	4–0	1–4	2–2	1–1	4–0	0–3	3–1	5–0
Crawley Down Gatwick	6–1	4–1	4–1	2–2		2–3	2–1	7–0	4–6	3–4	2–2	4–1	1–2	5–2	2–4	0–3	4–1	0–5	5–4	9–0
Eastbourne Town	1–1	2–0	2–1	2–3	0–2		4–1	5–2	3–1	0–5	1–1	3–1	2–2	1–1	2–6	3–0	5–0	1–5	4–0	6–1
Eastbourne United Association	4–0	4–0	1–0	1–4	2–1	1–3		4–2	1–2	0–1	2–1	3–1	2–4	3–3	3–2	4–3	3–2	3–4	1–0	3–0
Hailsham Town	0–1	4–3	2–2	2–6	3–3	0–1	0–1		0–8	0–8	0–6	1–2	2–1	3–4	0–4	0–4	0–4	0–4	0–2	0–3
Hassocks	3–0	2–0	1–1	0–1	3–2	2–1	1–2	4–0		0–2	1–0	5–3	0–3	1–2	2–2	0–3	2–1	4–1	0–1	4–1
Haywards Heath Town	1–0	5–0	4–0	0–3	1–0	2–0	2–1	8–0	4–1		4–1	2–0	1–0	3–1	2–0	3–3	2–0	1–2	4–1	5–1
Horsham YMCA	3–0	0–4	0–1	1–3	4–1	2–2	0–0	4–1	3–2	1–7		3–1	4–1	0–0	1–4	0–0	3–2	1–0	5–3	4–1
Lancing	3–1	3–1	2–5	1–3	3–0	2–2	2–4	6–1	4–3	0–2	1–0		1–3	1–2	1–2	1–3	3–3	0–1	6–1	4–1
Littlehampton Town	1–2	2–1	0–3	2–3	1–2	1–0	0–1	5–3	2–0	2–3	1–1	1–3		1–3	2–2	3–2	1–3	2–1	1–3	1–0
Loxwood	6–0	1–0	2–1	1–1	3–0	0–1	1–0	5–2	2–0	0–3	4–0	1–2	4–2		0–3	0–3	2–0	1–2	4–1	0–1
Newhaven	0–0	2–3	2–4	0–3	2–2	3–4	4–1	2–0	5–0	1–6	1–0	2–2	7–0	0–0		0–1	2–2	0–3	3–2	6–3
Pagham	4–1	1–2	2–1	3–1	0–2	2–3	2–3	7–0	2–0	1–0	3–1	5–0	4–1	0–2	1–1		0–1	1–1	2–2	5–1
Peacehaven & Telscombe	1–2	4–0	3–2	1–0	5–2	2–3	1–3	5–0	1–0	2–2	3–4	1–1	3–2	2–2	1–3	1–4		1–3	2–1	2–1
Shoreham	6–0	5–0	3–0	3–1	5–1	2–2	5–0	5–1	2–1	1–3	1–2	3–1	4–1	4–0	3–0	1–0	2–0		4–1	1–0
Wick	3–1	1–1	1–2	0–3	2–3	0–4	0–1	5–1	1–2	1–5	2–2	0–2	1–1	3–2	3–2	0–1	2–2	0–4		1–2
Worthing United	2–0	0–4	2–2	1–3	0–0	1–2	2–1	6–1	0–5	0–1	3–0	5–1	1–4	2–2	2–2	1–6	0–3	0–4	1–0	

Source: SCFL Fixtures and Results
Legend: Blue = home team win; Yellow = draw; Red = away team win.

== Division One ==
Southern Combination Division One
- Season: 2016–17
- Champions: Saltdean United
- Promoted: Saltdean United; East Preston
- Matches: 306
- Goals: 1,222 (3.99 per match)

Division One featured 14 clubs which competed in the division last season, along with four new clubs:

- AFC Varndeanians, promoted from Division Two
- Billingshurst, promoted from Division Two
- East Preston, relegated from the Premier Division
- St Francis Rangers, relegated from the Premier Division
- Little Common could not be promoted as arranging a groundshare with another club in order to secure promotion was not allowed. This resulted in a reprieve for AFC Uckfield Town.

=== League table ===
Pos	Team	Pld	W	D	L	GF	GA	GD	Pts	Promotion
1	Saltdean United	34	24	7	3	87	33	+54	79	Promoted to the Premier Division
2	Little Common	34	23	6	5	103	49	+54	75	
3	East Preston	34	23	6	5	85	33	+52	75	Promoted to the Premier Division
4	Mile Oak	34	21	6	7	84	48	+36	69	
5	Lingfield	34	20	3	11	87	65	+22	63	
6	Steyning Town	34	18	6	10	81	64	+17	60	
7	Selsey	34	15	8	11	82	69	+13	53	
8	Langney Wanderers	34	16	3	15	92	87	+5	51	
9	Midhurst & Easebourne	34	12	8	14	66	72	−6	44	
10	Bexhill United	34	13	5	16	60	68	−8	44	
11	Southwick	34	12	7	15	65	67	−2	42 (Note: Southwick and Storrington were deducted one point each for fielding an ineligible player.)	
12	Storrington	34	9	10	15	52	70	−18	36	
13	Seaford Town	34	8	7	19	47	68	−21	31	
14	Oakwood	34	8	7	19	41	78	−37	31	
15	Billingshurst	34	7	7	20	55	86	−31	28	
16	Ringmer	34	7	7	20	47	86	−39	28	
17	St Francis Rangers	34	6	6	22	43	85	−42	24 (Note: St Francis Rangers and AFC Varndeanians were reprieved from relegation)	
18	AFC Varndeanians	34	4	11	19	45	94	−49	23	

Source: scfl.org.uk
Rules for classification: 1) points; 2) goal difference; 3) number of goals scored.

=== Results table ===
Home \ Away	VAR	BEX	BIL	EPR	LAW	LIN	LIT	MID	MIL	OAK	RIN	SDU	SEA	SEL	SOU	STF	STE	STO
AFC Vardeanians		0–4	4–4	1–7	3–2	0–2	2–2	4–0	0–9	2–2	0–3	0–2	2–2	0–4	2–4	0–0	1–3	1–1
Bexhill United	1–1		5–1	0–2	1–8	4–2	1–2	1–2	2–1	1–1	1–0	0–4	0–0	5–0	2–0	3–0	1–6	1–2
Billingshurst	2–3	1–2		0–3	5–1	1–2	2–2	3–0	2–6	3–0	7–2	1–3	0–3	2–2	1–3	4–2	1–3	2–2
East Preston	2–1	2–2	4–0		4–2	4–1	3–2	3–0	2–1	1–0	5–0	1–2	1–0	6–2	1–1	5–0	4–5	0–1
Langney Wanderers	1–2	5–0	4–0	3–1		3–0	1–3	1–5	1–5	6–0	5–2	0–4	2–1	1–1	1–0	4–1	1–2	4–2
Lingfield	4–1	5–3	4–3	1–4	5–2		1–5	4–2	4–2	2–0	4–0	2–2	4–1	2–2	4–1	3–1	1–3	4–0
Little Common	4–3	2–0	1–0	3–0	7–1	6–2		5–1	3–3	4–1	6–0	2–1	2–2	1–4	3–3	3–0	4–0	4–1
Midhurst & Easebourne	3–0	4–2	2–3	1–2	3–5	2–1	0–5		3–2	3–1	3–1	1–2	3–2	2–2	3–3	2–2	0–0	3–1
Mile Oak	2–0	1–0	1–1	0–0	3–4	2–1	1–0	2–1		4–1	3–2	4–0	3–0	4–3	0–3	3–0	2–1	2–0
Oakwood	4–1	2–1	0–1	0–2	2–0	3–3	1–2	1–1	1–2		0–4	1–1	4–2	1–5	1–3	1–0	2–2	2–2
Ringmer	0–0	1–2	1–1	0–3	3–3	1–0	2–3	2–1	4–4	0–2		0–1	2–2	4–1	2–2	0–1	1–2	1–1
Saltdean United	3–0	1–2	2–0	0–0	1–0	4–1	2–2	3–2	1–1	6–0	3–2		5–0	4–0	4–2	2–0	2–1	3–0
Seaford Town	2–1	1–4	3–2	1–1	2–2	0–2	2–3	0–1	0–1	2–1	3–0	3–4		0–3	3–1	0–1	1–3	3–0
Selsey	5–1	0–0	1–1	1–1	1–5	1–5	1–2	3–1	4–2	4–0	7–1	1–3	2–0		2–0	3–0	2–2	3–2
Southwick	2–1	3–2	5–1	0–3	7–2	1–2	1–2	2–2	0–1	1–5	1–2	1–1	2–0	2–4		2–1	3–4	3–1
St Francis Rangers	3–3	1–3	3–0	1–2	1–8	1–5	2–7	3–3	1–1	0–1	2–3	1–3	1–2	4–0	2–0		0–0	2–1
Steyning Town	3–3	4–3	6–0	0–2	9–1	0–3	3–0	0–5	1–2	3–0	3–0	0–6	3–2	1–5	1–2	3–2		3–1
Storrington	2–2	3–1	1–0	1–4	1–3	0–1	2–1	1–1	2–4	4–0	4–1	2–2	1–1	4–3	1–1	4–3	1–1	

Source: SCFL Fixtures and Results
Legend: Blue = home team win; Yellow = draw; Red = away team win.

== Division Two ==
Southern Combination Division Two
- Season: 2016–17
- Champions: Bosham
- Matches: 210
- Goals: 1,049 (5 per match)

Division Two featured twelve clubs which competed in the division last season, along with four new clubs:

- Jarvis Brook, promoted from the Mid-Sussex League
- Lancing United, promoted from the West Sussex League
- Sidlesham, demoted from Division One
- Worthing Town Leisure, promoted from the Brighton, Worthing & District League, and a merger between Worthing Town F.C. and Worthing Leisure F.C.

A.F.C. Roffey Club withdrew from the league in August 2016 without playing a match.

Promotion from this division depends on ground grading, and neither Bosham nor Jarvis Brook had the required grading. This resulted in reprieves for AFC Varndeanians and St Francis Rangers from Division One.

Pos	Team	Pld	W	D	L	GF	GA	GD	Pts	Notes
1	Bosham	28	21	4	3	102	24	+78	67	
2	Jarvis Brook	28	19	7	2	108	42	+66	64	
3	Sidlesham	28	18	6	4	83	28	+55	60	
4	Lancing United	28	17	4	7	88	45	+43	55	
5	Upper Beeding	28	13	8	7	86	39	+47	47	
6	Westfield	28	14	4	10	80	48	+32	46	
7	Roffey	28	11	8	9	73	37	+36	41	
8	Cowfold	28	12	5	11	82	54	+28	41	
9	Rottingdean Village	28	11	4	13	55	71	−16	37	
10	Montpelier Villa	28	9	5	14	64	52	+12	32	
11	Rustington	28	9	5	14	40	56	−16	32	
12	Clymping	28	8	6	14	63	75	−12	30	
13	Worthing Town Leisure	28	8	2	18	63	72	−9	26	
14	Alfold	28	5	2	21	48	106	−58	17	
15	Ferring	28	0	0	28	14	300	−286	0	
16	A.F.C. Roffey Club	0	0	0	0	0	0	0	0	Withdrawn
