= 2019–20 FA Cup qualifying rounds =

Tournament details
- Country: England; Wales

The 2019–20 FA Cup qualifying rounds opened the 139th season of competition in England for The Football Association Challenge Cup (FA Cup), the world's oldest association football single knockout competition.

The FA made 736 places available in the FA Cup for the 2019–20 season, the same number as had been accepted the previous year. The 92 teams from the EFL and Premier League received direct entry to the competition proper. The remaining 644 teams, from the National League System (levels 5–10 of the English football league system), entered into the qualifying competition consisting of six rounds of preliminary (2) and qualifying (4) knockout matches. With more eligible entrants than places available, teams from level 10 of the English football league system were accepted up to the point at which the 736 places were full, based on their points per game from the 2018–19 season, with 1.84 points per game being the cut off.

The 32 winning teams from the fourth qualifying round progressed to the First round proper.

== Calendar ==
The calendar for the 2019–20 Emirates FA Cup qualifying rounds, as announced by The Football Association.

Round	Main date	Leagues entering at this round	New entries this round	Winners from previous round	Number of fixtures	Prize fund	
Round	Main date	Leagues entering at this round	New entries this round	Winners from previous round	Number of fixtures	Losing club	Winning club
Extra preliminary round	10 August 2019	Levels 8–10	368	none	184	£750	£2,250
Preliminary round	24 August 2019	Level 7 (14 lowest ranked clubs); Level 8	136	184	160	£960	£2,890
First qualifying round	7 September 2019	Level 7	72	160	116	£1,500	£4,500
Second qualifying round	21 September 2019	National League North; National League South	44	116	80	£2,250	£6,750
Third qualifying round	5 October 2019	none	none	80	40	£3,750	£11,250
Fourth qualifying round	19 October 2019	National League	24	40	32	£6,250	£18,750

== Extra preliminary round ==
Extra preliminary round fixtures were played on 9–13 August 2019. The draw was held on Friday 12 July 2019. A total of 368 teams, from Level 8, Level 9 and Level 10 of English football, entered at this stage of the competition. This round contained 71 teams from Level 10.

Tie	Home team (Tier)	Score	Away team (Tier)	Att.
Friday 9 August 2019
22	Skelmersdale United (9)	1–1	Penistone Church (9)	99
80	Hackney Wick (10)	1–3	Framlingham Town (10)	
Match played at Framlingham Town.
96	Woodford Town (9)	1–1	White Ensign (10)	281
121	Balham (9)	1–0	Rusthall (10)	146
138	Bexhill United (10)	1–6	Eastbourne Town (9)	210
Match played at Eastbourne Town.
148	Sutton Common Rovers (9)	1–1	Molesey (9)	
179	Plymouth Parkway (9)	1–0	Buckland Athletic (9)	181
Saturday 10 August 2019
1	Consett (9)	1–1	Dunston (8)	451
2	Newton Aycliffe (9)	0–2	Northallerton Town (9)	
3	Kendal Town (8)	0–4	Hemsworth Miners Welfare (9)	
4	Shildon (9)	0–0	Garforth Town (9)	
5	Whitley Bay (9)	1–7	Hebburn Town (9)	
6	Ashington (9)	2–0	Albion Sports (9)	
7	Billingham Town (9)	3–0	Yorkshire Amateur (9)	
8	West Auckland Town (9)	1–3	Bridlington Town (9)	
9	North Shields (9)	2–2	Guisborough Town (9)	
10	Bishop Auckland (9)	0–2	Thornaby (9)	
11	Sunderland RCA (9)	0–0	Ryhope Colliery Welfare (9)	
12	Seaham Red Star (9)	4–2	Penrith (9)	
13	Harrogate Railway Athletic (10)	1–10	Whickham (9)	102
14	Nostell Miners Welfare (10)	2–2	Stockton Town (9)	
15	Hall Road Rangers (10)	0–3	Goole (9)	
16	Knaresborough Town (9)	0–3	Newcastle Benfield (9)	
17	Vauxhall Motors (10)	1–2	Winsford United (9)	
18	Charnock Richard (9)	2–1	Lower Breck (10)	185
19	Thackley (9)	1–4	Handsworth (9)	
20	Longridge Town (9)	6–1	Barnoldswick Town (9)	
21	Irlam (9)	4–0	Ashton Athletic (9)	
23	Northwich Victoria (9)	2–2	Silsden (9)	
24	AFC Liverpool (10)	2–3	Burscough (9)	
25	Avro (9)	3–4	Litherland REMYCA (9)	
26	Runcorn Town (9)	2–0	Rylands (9)	
27	Squires Gate (9)	1–2	West Didsbury & Chorlton (10)	
28	Clitheroe (8)	1–2	1874 Northwich (9)	
29	Eccleshill United (9)	2–1	Bootle (9)	
30	Athersley Recreation (9)	0–4	Padiham (9)	
31	City of Liverpool (8)	3–1	Campion (10)	
32	Liversedge (9)	5–1	Abbey Hey (10)	
33	Coventry Sphinx (9)	1–1	Coventry United (9)	480
34	Lye Town (9)	0–3	Lutterworth Town (9)	
Match played at Lutterworth Town.
36	Romulus (9)	0–0	Wolverhampton Casuals (10)	
37	Lichfield City (10)	3–2	Highgate United (9)	
38	Haughmond (9)	3–2	Walsall Wood (9)	
39	Atherstone Town (10)	1–3	Stourport Swifts (9)	
40	Congleton Town (9)	1–1	Westfields (9)	188
41	Hanley Town (9)	2–3	Leicester Road (10)	
42	Boldmere St. Michaels (9)	3–1	Daventry Town (8)	77
43	Tividale (9)	2–1	Wednesfield (10)	
44	Racing Club Warwick (9)	0–2	AFC Wulfrunians (9)	
45	Dunkirk (10)	w/o	Gresley (9)	
The match ended in a 1-1 draw, but Dunkirk were disqualified for fielding an ineligible player. Gresley were therefore awarded a walkover.
46	Sporting Khalsa (9)	5–4	Rugby Town (9)	
47	Heather St John's (9)	2–0	Wolverhampton Sporting (10)	
48	Malvern Town (10)	1–2	Whitchurch Alport (9)	
50	Radford (10)	0–7	Heanor Town (10)	
51	Winterton Rangers (10)	2–1	Grimsby Borough (9)	
52	Quorn (9)	1–2	Sherwood Colliery (10)	
53	Shepshed Dynamo (9)	2–4	Maltby Main (9)	
54	Leicester Nirvana (9)	2–1	Oadby Town (9)	
55	Worksop Town (8)	1–2	Melton Town (10)	341
56	Sleaford Town (9)	0–7	AFC Mansfield (9)	
57	Mulbarton Wanderers (10)	0–0	Boston Town (9)	
58	South Normanton Athletic (9)	5–0	Selston (9)	
59	Bottesford Town (9)	2–8	Long Eaton United (9)	
60	Barton Town (9)	3–2	Carlton Town (8)	
61	Anstey Nomads (9)	0–3	Kirby Muxloe (10)	
62	Loughborough University (9)	3–1	Ilkeston Town (8)	
63	Potton United (9)	1–2	Ely City (9)	82
64	March Town United (10)	2–1	Norwich United (9)	
65	Walsham-le-Willows (9)	1–2	Peterborough Northern Star (9)	
66	Eynesbury Rovers (9)	3–3	Wellingborough Town (9)	137
67	Desborough Town (9)	1–3	Histon (8)	
68	Thetford Town (9)	0–1	Rothwell Corinthians (9)	
69	Biggleswade (8)	4–1	Mildenhall Town (9)	
70	Holbeach United (9)	2–0	Fakenham Town (10)	
71	Bugbrooke St Michaels (10)	1–0	Norwich CBS (10)	
72	Biggleswade United (9)	1–0	Swaffham Town (9)	82
73	Harborough Town (9)	1–2	Deeping Rangers (9)	
74	Newmarket Town (9)	2–2	Arlesey Town (9)	
75	Gorleston (9)	1–0	Pinchbeck United (9)	
77	Great Yarmouth Town (10)	4–2	Wellingborough Whitworth (10)	
79	Walthamstow (9)	5–0	Sporting Bengal United (9)	
81	Haverhill Rovers (9)	1–6	Colney Heath (9)	
82	Crawley Green (9)	2–5	Takeley (9)	37
83	Hadley (9)	4–2	Redbridge (9)	68
85	Woodbridge Town (9)	1–0	Coggeshall United (10)	
87	Clapton (9)	0–6	Stowmarket Town (9)	31
88	Hullbridge Sports (8)	1–2	Stanway Rovers (9)	108
89	London Colney (9)	2–0	Hadleigh United (9)	76
90	Sawbridgeworth Town (9)	1–3	Halstead Town (10)	
91	FC Clacton (9)	3–0	St Margaretsbury (9)	
92	Southend Manor (9)	0–0	Long Melford (9)	
93	Leyton Athletic (10)	0–1	Cockfosters (9)	
Match played at Cockfosters.
94	Stotfold (10)	3–1	Harpenden Town (9)	
95	Ilford (9)	1–2	Harwich & Parkeston (10)	
98	Saffron Walden Town (9)	1–0	Baldock Town (9)	
99	Fairford Town (9)	3–2	Enfield 1893 (9)	
100	AFC Hayes (10)	1–1	Wembley (9)	
101	Clanfield (10)	1–3	Shortwood United (10)	
102	Dunstable Town (9)	3–2	Chipping Sodbury Town (9)	112
103	Slimbridge (8)	1–0	Edgware Town (9)	77
104	Tuffley Rovers (9)	1–1	North Greenford United (9)	
105	Royal Wootton Bassett Town (9)	1–1	Aylesbury Vale Dynamos (9)	
106	Abingdon United (10)	1–2	Brimscombe & Thrupp (9)	
107	London Tigers (10)	0–2	Thame Rangers (10)	
108	Newport Pagnell Town (9)	6–2	Cheltenham Saracens (10)	130
109	Leverstock Green (9)	1–1	Ardley United (9)	95
110	Oxhey Jets (9)	0–4	Flackwell Heath (9)	96
112	Bishop's Cleeve (9)	3–0	Easington Sports (9)	
113	Wantage Town (8)	1–1	Brackley Town Saints (9)	111
114	Leighton Town (9)	4–1	Thornbury Town (10)	167

Tie	Home team (Tier)	Score	Away team (Tier)	Att.
115	Shrivenham (9)	1–1	Holmer Green (9)	
116	Harefield United (9)	3–0	Lydney Town (9)	93
117	Longlevens (9)	3–0	Malmesbury Victoria (10)	
119	AFC Croydon Athletic (9)	1–0	Virginia Water (9)	
120	Loxwood (9)	1–1	Abbey Rangers (9)	
122	Crawley Down Gatwick (9)	0–2	Newhaven (9)	
123	Cray Valley Paper Mills (8)	2–1	Chatham Town (9)	
125	Bridon Ropes (10)	3–1	Broadfields United (9)	
126	Tunbridge Wells (9)	1–1	Pagham (9)	197
127	Corinthian (9)	1–2	Little Common (9)	
128	Walton & Hersham (10)	2–4	Southall (9)	
129	Horley Town (9)	2–2	Bearsted (9)	
130	Egham Town (9)	2–2	Lancing (9)	
131	Lordswood (9)	0–1	Steyning Town (9)	
132	CB Hounslow United (9)	2–1	Sheerwater (9)	
133	Horsham YMCA (9)	2–1	Croydon (10)	
134	Saltdean United (9)	6–1	Eastbourne United (9)	
135	Chertsey Town (8)	1–1	Cobham (9)	
136	Tower Hamlets (9)	2–1	Selsey (10)	
137	Chichester City (8)	3–1	Erith Town (9)	120
139	Hassocks (9)	2–0	Langney Wanderers (9)	
140	Arundel (10)	2–0	Banstead Athletic (9)	
141	Redhill (9)	2–1	K Sports (9)	
142	Glebe (9)	3–1	Hollands & Blair (9)	
143	Colliers Wood United (9)	2–3	Shoreham (10)	
144	Sheppey United (9)	4–1	East Preston (9)	
145	Guildford City (9)	3–2	Tooting Bec (10)	
146	Punjab United (9)	0–1	Broadbridge Heath (9)	
147	Sutton Athletic (10)	3–2	Deal Town (9)	
149	Spelthorne Sports (9)	1–1	Lingfield (9)	
150	Greenwich Borough (9)	2–3	Canterbury City (9)	
151	Crowborough Athletic (9)	1–2	AFC Varndeanians (10)	
152	Welling Town (9)	1–4	AFC Uckfield Town (9)	
153	Hanworth Villa (9)	3–2	Fisher (9)	
154	Beckenham Town (9)	4–3	Raynes Park Vale (9)	65
155	Team Solent (9)	0–3	Portland United (9)	
156	Shaftesbury (9)	1–4	Knaphill (9)	
157	Cowes Sports (9)	0–4	Lymington Town (9)	
158	Fleet Town (9)	2–2	Farnham Town (10)	
159	Brockenhurst (9)	0–2	AFC Stoneham (9)	
160	Bournemouth (9)	2–1	Frimley Green (9)	
161	Windsor (9)	0–3	Reading City (9)	
162	Bemerton Heath Harlequins (10)	3–3	Andover New Street (10)	
163	Sholing (8)	1–0	Tadley Calleva (9)	162
164	Ascot United (9)	2–2	Badshot Lea (9)	
Match played at Badshot Lea.
165	Binfield (9)	3–2	United Services Portsmouth (10)	
166	Romsey Town (10)	1–5	Hamble Club (9)	
167	Amesbury Town (9)	2–7	Christchurch (9)	
168	Westbury United (9)	0–1	Fareham Town (9)	87
169	Hamworthy United (9)	3–0	Bashley (9)	
170	AFC Portchester (9)	2–2	Hythe & Dibden (10)	
171	Horndean (9)	5–3	Camberley Town (9)	
172	Alresford Town (9)	0–0	Baffins Milton Rovers (9)	
173	Cheddar (10)	2–3	Bradford Town (9)	157
174	Bitton (9)	2–1	Bridport (9)	74
175	Wellington (9)	1–1	Cribbs (9)	
Match played at Cribbs.
176	Keynsham Town (9)	0–1	Brislington (9)	177
177	Exmouth Town (9)	2–0	Barnstaple Town (8)	301
178	Saltash United (10)	1–2	Clevedon Town (9)	
180	Willand Rovers (8)	2–1	AFC St Austell (10)	168
181	Tavistock (9)	3–0	Hengrove Athletic (10)	
182	Street (9)	4–1	Odd Down (9)	100
183	Shepton Mallet (9)	3–1	Cadbury Heath (9)	105
184	Bridgwater Town (9)	1–0	Hallen (9)	129
Sunday 11 August 2019
35	Worcester City (9)	4–1	Stone Old Alleynians (10)	276
49	Hallam (10)	0–2	Staveley Miners Welfare (9)	304
76	Northampton ON Chenecks (9)	2–3	Godmanchester Rovers (9)	90
78	Kirkley & Pakefield (9)	2–2	Wroxham (9)	
84	Hoddesdon Town (9)	2–0	Brantham Athletic (9)	121
86	Barkingside (10)	4–1	Stansted (9)	
97	West Essex (9)	1–2	Whitton United (9)	
118	Winslow United (10)	2–3	Roman Glass St George (9)	278
124	Erith & Belvedere (9)	1–1	Peacehaven & Telscombe (9)	
Tuesday 13 August 2019
111	Burnham (9)	2–1	Tring Athletic (9)	107
Replays
Tuesday 13 August 2019
1R	Dunston (8)	5–2	Consett (9)	398
4R	Garforth Town (9)	3–2	Shildon (9)	165
11R	Ryhope Colliery Welfare (9)	1–2	Sunderland RCA (9)	188
23R	Silsden (9)	3–4	Northwich Victoria (9)	166
36R	Wolverhampton Casuals (10)	1–2 (a.e.t.)	Romulus (9)	132
40R	Westfields (9)	4–1	Congleton Town (9)	132
57R	Boston Town (9)	4–2	Mulbarton Wanderers (10)	
66R	Wellingborough Town (9)	4–1	Eynesbury Rovers (9)	
74R	Arlesey Town (9)	1–0	Newmarket Town (9)	133
100R	Wembley (9)	3–2	AFC Hayes (10)	71
104R	North Greenford United (9)	2–1	Tuffley Rovers (9)	56
105R	Aylesbury Vale Dynamos (9)	1–0	Royal Wootton Bassett Town (9)	204
109R	Ardley United (9)	3–1	Leverstock Green (9)	66
115R	Holmer Green (9)	1–1 (4–5 p)	Shrivenham (9)	78
120R	Abbey Rangers (9)	2–0	Loxwood (9)	78
124R	Peacehaven & Telscombe (9)	1–1 (3–5 p)	Erith & Belvedere (9)	210
126R	Pagham (9)	0–2	Tunbridge Wells (9)	92
129R	Bearsted (9)	0–2	Horley Town (9)	
130R	Lancing (9)	4–4 (3–4 p)	Egham Town (9)	87
135R	Cobham (9)	2–4	Chertsey Town (8)	
148R	Molesey (9)	0–1	Sutton Common Rovers (9)	
149R	Lingfield (9)	0–4	Spelthorne Sports (9)	80
158R	Farnham Town (10)	1–2	Fleet Town (9)	
162R	Andover New Street (10)	3–2	Bemerton Heath Harlequins (10)	144
164R	Badshot Lea (9)	2–1	Ascot United (9)	123
170R	Hythe & Dibden (10)	3–2	AFC Portchester (9)	122
175R	Cribbs (9)	5–1	Wellington (9)	
Wednesday 14 August 2019
9R	Guisborough Town (9)	1–0	North Shields (9)	304
14R	Stockton Town (9)	5–1	Nostell Miners Welfare (10)	396
22R	Penistone Church (9)	2–5	Skelmersdale United (9)	
33R	Coventry United (9)	0–1	Coventry Sphinx (9)	160
78R	Wroxham (9)	3–2	Kirkley & Pakefield (9)	136
92R	Long Melford (9)	3–3 (5–4 p)	Southend Manor (9)	
96R	White Ensign (10)	3–1 (a.e.t.)	Woodford Town (9)	
113R	Brackley Town Saints (9)	1–2	Wantage Town (8)	116
172R	Baffins Milton Rovers (9)	2–1	Alresford Town (9)	110

== Preliminary round ==
Preliminary round fixtures were played on 23–25 August 2019. The draw was held on Friday 12 July 2019. A total of 136 teams, from Level 7 and Level 8 of English football, entered at this stage of the competition. These teams joined 184 winners from the extra preliminary round. This round contained 25 teams from Level 10; the lowest-ranked teams in the competition.

Tie	Home team (Tier)	Score	Away team (Tier)	Att.
Friday 23 August 2019
5	Whickham (9)	1–2	Thornaby (9)	
30	Mickleover Sports (7)	3–0	Coventry Sphinx (9)	
53	Great Yarmouth Town (10)	0–2	Rothwell Corinthians (9)	
78	Barking (8)	2–1	Aveley (8)	
Match played at Aveley.
113	Sutton Common Rovers (9)	3–0	Eastbourne Town (9)	
118	Whitehawk (8)	2–0	Saltdean United (9)	350
142	Christchurch (9)	1–2	Badshot Lea (9)	
147	Blackfield & Langley (7)	2–1	AFC Totton (8)	144
148	Winchester City (8)	1–1	AFC Stoneham (9)	259
Saturday 24 August 2019
1	Dunston (8)	2–2	Goole (9)	
2	Newcastle Benfield (9)	1–0	Workington (8)	
3	Seaham Red Star (9)	3–1	Guisborough Town (9)	
4	Billingham Town (9)	3–4	Ossett United (8)	
6	Garforth Town (9)	0–4	Colne (8)	
7	Ashington (9)	1–3	Marske United (8)	
8	Sunderland RCA (9)	1–0	Hemsworth Miners Welfare (9)	
9	Pickering Town (8)	3–1	Bridlington Town (9)	
10	Brighouse Town (8)	2–2	Morpeth Town (7)	
11	Pontefract Collieries (8)	1–1	Hebburn Town (9)	147
12	Frickley Athletic (8)	0–1	Tadcaster Albion (8)	
13	Northallerton Town (9)	0–3	Stockton Town (9)	302
14	Widnes (8)	2–2	Mossley (8)	
15	City of Liverpool (8)	2–1	Skelmersdale United (9)	
16	Sheffield (8)	2–1	Litherland REMYCA (9)	
17	Eccleshill United (9)	1–1	Glossop North End (8)	
18	Stalybridge Celtic (7)	0–0	West Didsbury & Chorlton (10)	
19	Ramsbottom United (8)	3–3	Winsford United (9)	233
20	Charnock Richard (9)	1–1	Longridge Town (9)	234
21	Trafford (8)	2–0	Burscough (9)	
22	Liversedge (9)	1–0	Droylsden (8)	
23	Atherton Collieries (7)	2–1	Runcorn Linnets (8)	
24	1874 Northwich (9)	6–0	Handsworth (9)	
25	Northwich Victoria (9)	2–1	Prescot Cables (8)	247
26	Stocksbridge Park Steels (8)	2–3	Irlam (9)	
27	Padiham (9)	1–1	Marine (8)	
28	Radcliffe (7)	0–0	Runcorn Town (9)	
29	Kidsgrove Athletic (8)	1–1	Newcastle Town (8)	152
31	Coleshill Town (8)	0–3	Whitchurch Alport (9)	84
32	Tividale (9)	0–5	Chasetown (8)	
33	AFC Wulfrunians (9)	0–1	Leek Town (8)	114
34	Stourport Swifts (9)	0–0	Boldmere St. Michaels (9)	
35	Bromsgrove Sporting (7)	2–1	Leicester Road (10)	684
36	Bedworth United (8)	1–1	Halesowen Town (8)	178
37	Belper Town (8)	1–1	Sporting Khalsa (9)	
38	Romulus (9)	6–0	Market Drayton Town (8)	
39	Heather St John's (9)	1–0	Worcester City (9)	
40	Gresley (9)	1–2	Sutton Coldfield Town (8)	
41	Lichfield City (10)	3–0	Haughmond (9)	122
42	Westfields (9)	2–3	Lutterworth Town (9)	141
43	Barton Town (9)	1–3	Grantham Town (7)	
44	Loughborough Dynamo (8)	2–2	Sherwood Colliery (10)	
45	Melton Town (10)	1–3	Cleethorpes Town (8)	405
46	Boston Town (9)	0–0	Leicester Nirvana (9)	
47	Heanor Town (10)	0–0	AFC Mansfield (9)	
48	Long Eaton United (9)	1–1	South Normanton Athletic (9)	
49	Maltby Main (9)	4–1	Loughborough University (9)	109
50	Winterton Rangers (10)	0–1	Kirby Muxloe (10)	
51	Staveley Miners Welfare (9)	2–1	Lincoln United (8)	
52	Spalding United (8)	2–4	Dereham Town (8)	144
54	Peterborough Sports (7)	7–0	Bugbrooke St Michaels (10)	175
55	Gorleston (9)	0–1	Kempston Rovers (8)	107
56	Bedford Town (8)	0–1	Deeping Rangers (9)	207
57	Wisbech Town (8)	2–2	Ely City (9)	
58	March Town United (10)	2–1	Wellingborough Town (9)	
59	Corby Town (8)	4–0	Holbeach United (9)	348
60	Wroxham (9)	2–4	Stamford (8)	148
61	Cambridge City (8)	0–2	Barton Rovers (8)	147
62	Arlesey Town (9)	2–0	Peterborough Northern Star (9)	
63	Biggleswade (8)	4–0	Yaxley (8)	124
64	Bury Town (8)	1–2	Histon (8)	333
65	Godmanchester Rovers (9)	1–1	St Neots Town (8)	180
66	Soham Town Rangers (8)	2–0	Biggleswade United (9)	109
67	Walthamstow (9)	2–0	Great Wakering Rovers (8)	160
68	Cockfosters (9)	0–4	Coggeshall Town (8)	
69	Harwich & Parkeston (10)	0–2	Romford (8)	
70	Long Melford (9)	0–2	Colney Heath (9)	
71	Hadley (9)	2–0	Hoddesdon Town (9)	
72	London Colney (9)	5–0	Halstead Town (10)	
73	Whitton United (9)	2–1	Hertford Town (8)	
74	AFC Sudbury (8)	2–1	Felixstowe & Walton United (8)	201
76	Grays Athletic (8)	5–2	Heybridge Swifts (8)	
77	FC Clacton (9)	1–1	Witham Town (8)	
79	Stotfold (10)	0–2	Canvey Island (8)	
80	Bowers & Pitsea (7)	4–2	Barkingside (10)	
81	Saffron Walden Town (9)	1–2	Maldon & Tiptree (8)	271
82	Harlow Town (8)	1–1	Brentwood Town (8)	175
83	Tilbury (8)	3–1	Stanway Rovers (9)	119
84	Wingate & Finchley (7)	2–0	Welwyn Garden City (8)	121
85	Cheshunt (7)	1–0	Stowmarket Town (9)	187
86	Basildon United (8)	7–1	Framlingham Town (10)	98
87	Waltham Abbey (8)	4–0	Woodbridge Town (9)	
88	Takeley (9)	3–3	White Ensign (10)	
89	Cirencester Town (8)	5–0	North Greenford United (9)	100
90	Aylesbury Vale Dynamos (9)	4–5	North Leigh (8)	113
91	Shrivenham (9)	0–2	Chalfont St Peter (8)	
92	Longlevens (9)	1–0	Northwood (8)	
93	Wantage Town (8)	2–2	Thame Rangers (10)	79
94	Bishop's Cleeve (9)	1–4	Kidlington (8)	
96	Highworth Town (8)	3–0	Ardley United (9)	114
97	Marlow (8)	2–4	Cinderford Town (8)	141
98	Fairford Town (9)	2–3	Hanwell Town (8)	

Tie	Home team (Tier)	Score	Away team (Tier)	Att.
99	Wembley (9)	2–3	Berkhamsted (8)	68
100	Didcot Town (8)	2–1	Roman Glass St George (9)	141
101	Thame United (8)	3–3	Leighton Town (9)	101
103	Slimbridge (8)	1–1	Burnham (9)	82
104	Brimscombe & Thrupp (9)	1–3	Aylesbury United (8)	
105	AFC Dunstable (8)	0–0	Hayes & Yeading United (7)	121
106	Newport Pagnell Town (9)	1–2	Flackwell Heath (9)	145
107	Tooting & Mitcham United (8)	1–0	Faversham Town (8)	219
108	Sittingbourne (8)	2–0	Uxbridge (8)	159
109	Horsham YMCA (9)	2–1	Egham Town (9)	
110	Little Common (9)	2–1	Three Bridges (8)	
112	Sutton Athletic (10)	6–0	Ashford Town (8)	
114	Steyning Town (9)	1–4	Ramsgate (8)	
115	Herne Bay (8)	2–2	AFC Croydon Athletic (9)	262
116	Chertsey Town (8)	5–1	Erith & Belvedere (9)	
117	Sheppey United (9)	3–1	Glebe (9)	172
119	Cray Valley Paper Mills (8)	0–2	Whyteleafe (8)	83
120	Whitstable Town (8)	3–1	Newhaven (9)	219
121	Burgess Hill Town (8)	0–3	Sevenoaks Town (8)	
122	VCD Athletic (8)	3–3	AFC Uckfield Town (9)	
123	Bedfont Sports (8)	3–2	Hanworth Villa (9)	
124	Redhill (9)	1–4	Balham (9)	
125	South Park (8)	2–1	Canterbury City (9)	82
126	East Grinstead Town (8)	0–1	Abbey Rangers (9)	86
127	Tower Hamlets (9)	1–6	Horsham (7)	89
128	Arundel (10)	1–0	Shoreham (10)	
129	Beckenham Town (9)	0–1	Ashford United (8)	
130	Phoenix Sports (8)	0–6	Staines Town (8)	111
131	Southall (9)	1–2	Spelthorne Sports (9)	
132	Bridon Ropes (10)	2–7	Chichester City (8)	92
133	Chipstead (8)	0–0	Hassocks (9)	64
134	Guildford City (9)	1–2	AFC Varndeanians (10)	
135	Haywards Heath Town (8)	2–1	Tunbridge Wells (9)	169
136	CB Hounslow United (9)	0–3	Horley Town (9)	
137	Hastings United (8)	2–1	Broadbridge Heath (9)	
138	Portland United (9)	4–3	Hamworthy United (9)	229
139	Hythe & Dibden (10)	2–1	Horndean (9)	
140	Hamble Club (9)	0–1	Sholing (8)	182
141	Reading City (9)	0–3	Moneyfields (8)	72
Match played at Moneyfields.
143	Fleet Town (9)	3–0	Baffins Milton Rovers (9)	
144	Bournemouth (9)	0–5	Bracknell Town (8)	
145	Binfield (9)	3–2	Lymington Town (9)	
146	Thatcham Town (8)	7–1	Andover New Street (10)	240
149	Basingstoke Town (8)	0–2	Westfield (Surrey) (8)	156
150	Knaphill (9)	0–1	Fareham Town (9)	
151	Plymouth Parkway (9)	5–2	Paulton Rovers (8)	184
152	Yate Town (7)	2–2	Exmouth Town (9)	
153	Bridgwater Town (9)	7–0	Brislington (9)	
154	Cribbs (9)	0–1	Bideford (8)	
155	Clevedon Town (9)	2–5	Bristol Manor Farm (8)	171
156	Tavistock (9)	2–1	Frome Town (8)	102
157	Shepton Mallet (9)	1–1	Melksham Town (8)	196
158	Bradford Town (9)	3–1	Larkhall Athletic (8)	171
159	Street (9)	1–5	Willand Rovers (8)	119
160	Bitton (9)	2–3	Mangotsfield United (8)	
Sunday 25 August 2019
75	FC Romania (8)	3–3	Ware (8)	68
95	Dunstable Town (9)	4–1	Shortwood United (10)	152
102	Evesham United (8)	2–1	Harefield United (9)	270
111	Cray Wanderers (7)	5–0	Hythe Town (8)	230
Replays
Monday 26 August 2019
36R	Halesowen Town (8)	3–1	Bedworth United (8)	377
Tuesday 27 August 2019
46R	Leicester Nirvana (9)	0–1	Boston Town (9)	
Wednesday 28 August 2019
20R	Longridge Town (9)	0–2	Charnock Richard (9)	
Monday 2 September 2019
19R	Winsford United (9)	1–3	Ramsbottom United (8)	352
34R	Boldmere St. Michaels (9)	4–1	Stourport Swifts (9)	
157R	Melksham Town (8)	2–3	Shepton Mallet (9)	
Tuesday 3 September 2019
1R	Goole (9)	1–4	Dunston (8)	280
10R	Morpeth Town (7)	3–2	Brighouse Town (8)	
11R	Hebburn Town (9)	0–4	Pontefract Collieries (8)	
14R	Mossley (8)	2–3	Widnes (8)	
17R	Glossop North End (8)	3–1	Eccleshill United (9)	177
18R	West Didsbury & Chorlton (10)	2–3	Stalybridge Celtic (7)	553
27R	Marine (8)	3–0	Padiham (9)	345
29R	Newcastle Town (8)	1–2	Kidsgrove Athletic (8)	210
37R	Sporting Khalsa (9)	1–3 (a.e.t.)	Belper Town (8)	
44R	Sherwood Colliery (10)	0–1	Loughborough Dynamo (8)	418
47R	AFC Mansfield (9)	2–1	Heanor Town (10)	
48R	South Normanton Athletic (9)	1–0	Long Eaton United (9)	
57R	Ely City (9)	0–4	Wisbech Town (8)	
65R	St Neots Town (8)	3–1	Godmanchester Rovers (9)	
75R	Ware (8)	2–1	FC Romania (8)	137
77R	Witham Town (8)	3–2 (a.e.t.)	FC Clacton (9)	157
82R	Brentwood Town (8)	2–1	Harlow Town (8)	203
101R	Leighton Town (9)	2–1	Thame United (8)	
103R	Burnham (9)	1–1 (5–4 p)	Slimbridge (8)	
105R	Hayes & Yeading United (7)	2–1 (a.e.t.)	AFC Dunstable (8)	
115R	AFC Croydon Athletic (9)	0–1	Herne Bay (8)	131
122R	AFC Uckfield Town (9)	1–1 (4–5 p)	VCD Athletic (8)	
133R	Hassocks (9)	2–3	Chipstead (8)	154
148R	AFC Stoneham (9)	1–3	Winchester City (8)	
152R	Exmouth Town (9)	2–0	Yate Town (7)	451
Wednesday 4 September 2019
28R	Runcorn Town (9)	2–1	Radcliffe (7)	
88R	White Ensign (10)	2–3 (a.e.t.)	Takeley (9)	
93R	Thame Rangers (10)	2–4 (a.e.t.)	Wantage Town (8)	

== First qualifying round ==
First qualifying round fixtures were played the weekend of 6–8 September 2019. The draw was held on 27 August 2019. A total of 232 teams took part in this stage of the competition, including the 160 winners from the Preliminary round and 72 entering at this stage from the four leagues at Level 7 of English football. The round included seven teams from Level 10, the lowest-ranked teams still in the competition.

Tie	Home team (Tier)	Score	Away team (Tier)	Att.
Friday 6 September 2019
89	Sutton Common Rovers (9)	1–3	Beaconsfield Town (7)	
Saturday 7 September 2019
1	Thornaby (9)	2–2	Ossett United (8)	
2	1874 Northwich (9)	2–0	Pickering Town (8)	
3	Scarborough Athletic (7)	1–1	Marske United (8)	698
4	Lancaster City (7)	0–0	Northwich Victoria (9)	
5	FC United of Manchester (7)	2–2	Atherton Collieries (7)	1,216
6	Dunston (8)	0–0	Sunderland RCA (9)	
7	Liversedge (9)	0–2	Stockton Town (9)	
8	Newcastle Benfield (9)	2–3	Runcorn Town (9)	
9	Warrington Town (7)	2–2	City of Liverpool (8)	
10	Charnock Richard (9)	0–4	Irlam (9)	209
11	Widnes (8)	0–4	Whitby Town (7)	
12	Tadcaster Albion (8)	2–2	Ashton United (7)	
13	Stalybridge Celtic (7)	0–2	Marine (8)	
14	Trafford (8)	3–0	Bamber Bridge (7)	
15	Glossop North End (8)	1–3	Pontefract Collieries (8)	222
16	South Shields (7)	0–0	Colne (8)	1,157
17	Maltby Main (9)	1–5	Ramsbottom United (8)	
18	Morpeth Town (7)	3–1	Hyde United (7)	
19	Seaham Red Star (9)	0–1	Witton Albion (7)	
20	Kirby Muxloe (10)	0–1	Boston Town (9)	
21	Lutterworth Town (9)	0–3	Hednesford Town (7)	
22	Halesowen Town (8)	7–1	Lichfield City (10)	
23	South Normanton Athletic (9)	0–1	Coalville Town (7)	
24	Tamworth (7)	3–1	Nuneaton Borough (7)	1,047
25	Loughborough Dynamo (8)	1–0	Heather St John's (9)	
26	Barwell (7)	4–1	AFC Mansfield (9)	149
27	Romulus (9)	0–4	Buxton (7)	
28	Banbury United (7)	2–2	Gainsborough Trinity (7)	
29	Matlock Town (7)	2–1	Basford United (7)	431
30	Stratford Town (7)	6–1	Boldmere St. Michaels (9)	
31	Rushall Olympic (7)	3–1	Sheffield (8)	
32	Belper Town (8)	1–0	Alvechurch (7)	329
33	Nantwich Town (7)	3–1	Grantham Town (7)	359
34	Kidsgrove Athletic (8)	2–1	Cleethorpes Town (8)	193
35	Sutton Coldfield Town (8)	1–1	Redditch United (7)	
36	Stafford Rangers (7)	3–0	Mickleover Sports (7)	529
37	Bromsgrove Sporting (7)	0–1	Stourbridge (7)	
38	Whitchurch Alport (9)	0–2	Leek Town (8)	797
39	Chasetown (8)	1–0	Staveley Miners Welfare (9)	237
40	Wingate & Finchley (7)	4–1	London Colney (9)	111
41	Soham Town Rangers (8)	3–0	Whitton United (9)	
42	Takeley (9)	0–1	Potters Bar Town (7)	160
43	Deeping Rangers (9)	2–2	AFC Sudbury (8)	198
44	Enfield Town (7)	1–0	AFC Rushden & Diamonds (7)	
45	Kings Langley (7)	3–1	Barking (8)	
46	Hornchurch (7)	6–0	Kempston Rovers (8)	240
47	Cheshunt (7)	1–0	Brightlingsea Regent (7)	144
48	Stamford (8)	1–0	Witham Town (8)	241
49	Biggleswade (8)	2–1	Tilbury (8)	164
50	Basildon United (8)	2–1	Coggeshall Town (8)	104
51	Royston Town (7)	7–2	Rothwell Corinthians (9)	
52	Histon (8)	0–3	Maldon & Tiptree (8)	165
53	Waltham Abbey (8)	2–2	Canvey Island (8)	151
54	Colney Heath (9)	1–3	Corby Town (8)	
55	Dunstable Town (9)	3–5	Bishop's Stortford (7)	221
56	Grays Athletic (8)	w/o	March Town United (10)	201
Grays Athletic originally won 3-1, but it was later discovered that they had fielded an ineligible player in the previous round. Grays Athletic were disqualified, and March Town United were awarded a walkover.
57	Barton Rovers (8)	4–0	Romford (8)	
59	St Ives Town (7)	2–1	Berkhamsted (8)	
60	Ware (8)	5–1	Leiston (7)	157
61	East Thurrock United (7)	1–1	Peterborough Sports (7)	
62	Wisbech Town (8)	1–2	Hitchin Town (7)	255
63	Bowers & Pitsea (7)	2–1	Brentwood Town (8)	158
64	St Neots Town (8)	2–2	Biggleswade Town (7)	288
65	Hadley (9)	3–2	Arlesey Town (9)	
66	Dereham Town (8)	1–1	Needham Market (7)	256
67	Lowestoft Town (7)	2–0	Leighton Town (9)	388
68	Whitstable Town (8)	0–4	Folkestone Invicta (7)	503
69	Chesham United (7)	4–2	Fleet Town (9)	

Tie	Home team (Tier)	Score	Away team (Tier)	Att.
70	Whyteleafe (8)	1–0	Merstham (7)	233
71	Chertsey Town (8)	4–1	Sheppey United (9)	
72	Chichester City (8)	2–0	Chalfont St Peter (8)	216
73	Hartley Wintney (7)	3–0	Spelthorne Sports (9)	
74	Bracknell Town (8)	0–2	Carshalton Athletic (7)	
76	Leatherhead (7)	2–2	Lewes (7)	305
77	Hanwell Town (8)	2–3	Staines Town (8)	
78	South Park (8)	1–3	Badshot Lea (9)	98
79	Tooting & Mitcham United (8)	3–1	AFC Varndeanians (10)	260
80	Whitehawk (8)	0–1	Abbey Rangers (9)	330
81	Hastings United (8)	3–3	Worthing (7)	541
82	Haywards Heath Town (8)	0–1	Hayes & Yeading United (7)	147
83	Harrow Borough (7)	5–0	Binfield (9)	
84	Horley Town (9)	1–3	Balham (9)	
86	Westfield (Surrey) (8)	0–1	Chipstead (8)	126
87	Haringey Borough (7)	3–0	Herne Bay (8)	
88	Corinthian-Casuals (7)	4–0	Sevenoaks Town (8)	235
90	Ashford United (8)	0–3	Farnborough (7)	358
91	Ramsgate (8)	0–0	Arundel (10)	197
92	Sutton Athletic (10)	1–1	Flackwell Heath (9)	
93	VCD Athletic (8)	1–2	Moneyfields (8)	
94	Bognor Regis Town (7)	3–0	Sittingbourne (8)	339
95	Little Common (9)	0–1	Hendon (7)	119
96	Horsham YMCA (9)	1–2	Margate (7)	
97	Metropolitan Police (7)	1–1	Horsham (7)	
98	Weston-super-Mare (7)	3–0	Fareham Town (9)	342
99	Cinderford Town (8)	5–3	Bideford (8)	
100	Didcot Town (8)	0–1	Poole Town (7)	
101	Truro City (7)	2–1	Wimborne Town (7)	363
102	Plymouth Parkway (9)	0–1	Merthyr Town (7)	201
103	Bridgwater Town (9)	1–3	Bristol Manor Farm (8)	291
104	Winchester City (8)	0–3	Taunton Town (7)	234
105	Willand Rovers (8)	1–2	North Leigh (8)	
106	Burnham (9)	2–3	Tiverton Town (7)	143
107	Hythe & Dibden (10)	2–4	Kidlington (8)	
108	Tavistock (9)	3–3	Shepton Mallet (9)	145
109	Highworth Town (8)	4–2	Exmouth Town (9)	
110	Wantage Town (8)	0–3	Swindon Supermarine (7)	
111	Longlevens (9)	0–2	Portland United (9)	
112	Thatcham Town (8)	2–3	Salisbury (7)	
113	Cirencester Town (8)	1–0	Gosport Borough (7)	
115	Mangotsfield United (8)	0–5	Blackfield & Langley (7)	
116	Sholing (8)	3–0	Bradford Town (9)	201
Sunday 8 September 2019
58	Aylesbury United (8)	0–3	Walthamstow (9)	
75	Kingstonian (7)	2–0	Walton Casuals (7)	376
85	Cray Wanderers (7)	2–1	Bedfont Sports (8)	225
114	Evesham United (8)	0–2	Dorchester Town (7)	320
Replays
Tuesday 10 September 2019
1R	Ossett United (8)	6–0	Thornaby (9)	265
3R	Marske United (8)	1–2	Scarborough Athletic (7)	550
5R	Atherton Collieries (7)	0–1	FC United of Manchester (7)	947
9R	City of Liverpool (8)	0–4	Warrington Town (7)	
12R	Ashton United (7)	4–2	Tadcaster Albion (8)	
16R	Colne (8)	1–0	South Shields (7)	
28R	Gainsborough Trinity (7)	1–0	Banbury United (7)	
35R	Redditch United (7)	1–3	Sutton Coldfield Town (8)	
43R	AFC Sudbury (8)	2–3	Deeping Rangers (9)	174
53R	Canvey Island (8)	2–1	Waltham Abbey (8)	176
61R	Peterborough Sports (7)	3–2	East Thurrock United (7)	
66R	Needham Market (7)	2–1	Dereham Town (8)	234
81R	Worthing (7)	3–2 (a.e.t.)	Hastings United (8)	
91R	Arundel (10)	0–4	Ramsgate (8)	
92R	Flackwell Heath (9)	3–1	Sutton Athletic (10)	
97R	Horsham (7)	3–2	Metropolitan Police (7)	445
108R	Shepton Mallet (9)	1–2	Tavistock (9)	247
Wednesday 11 September 2019
4R	Northwich Victoria (9)	1–2	Lancaster City (7)	
6R	Sunderland RCA (9)	0–5	Dunston (8)	
64R	Biggleswade Town (7)	2–0	St Neots Town (8)	
76R	Lewes (7)	2–2 (3–1 p)	Leatherhead (7)	395

== Second qualifying round ==
Second qualifying round ties took place over the weekend of 21–22 September. The draw was held on 9 September 2019. A total of 160 teams took part in this stage of the competition, including the 116 winners from the first qualifying round and 44 entering at this stage from the two leagues at Level 6 of English football. Two teams from Level 10 were included in the draw after earning replays, but both sides lost those replays. This left 14 sides from Level 9 initially as the lowest-ranked teams still in the competition. However, Grays Athletic was removed from the competition on 20 September 2019 for fielding an ineligible player in an earlier round. Their opponent in the most recent round, March Town from Level 10, advanced instead, making them the lowest ranked team remaining in the competition.

Tie	Home team (Tier)	Score	Away team (Tier)	Att.
Saturday 21 September 2019
1	Marine (8)	1–2	Dunston (8)	396
2	Southport (6)	5–2	Scarborough Athletic (7)	
3	Chester (6)	1–1	Altrincham (6)	1,804
4	Curzon Ashton (6)	4–4	Blyth Spartans (6)	
5	Bradford (Park Avenue) (6)	2–4	Morpeth Town (7)	
6	Irlam (9)	0–2	York City (6)	798
7	Ashton United (7)	1–0	Pontefract Collieries (8)	192
8	Colne (8)	0–0	Ossett United (8)	
9	1874 Northwich (9)	0–1	Whitby Town (7)	
10	FC United of Manchester (7)	1–2	Warrington Town (7)	1,263
11	Trafford (8)	1–3	Darlington (6)	795
12	Gateshead (6)	6–0	Ramsbottom United (8)	480
13	Guiseley (6)	1–0	Stockton Town (9)	483
14	Lancaster City (7)	0–5	Spennymoor Town (6)	294
15	Runcorn Town (9)	1–3	Farsley Celtic (6)	
16	Alfreton Town (6)	1–1	King's Lynn Town (6)	335
17	Stamford (8)	0–4	Boston United (6)	671
18	Leamington (6)	2–2	Chasetown (8)	395
19	Kettering Town (6)	1–1	Sutton Coldfield Town (8)	421
20	Belper Town (8)	0–0	Witton Albion (7)	503
21	Loughborough Dynamo (8)	0–3	Tamworth (7)	416
22	AFC Telford United (6)	0–3	Nantwich Town (7)	718
23	Rushall Olympic (7)	2–0	Gainsborough Trinity (7)	
24	Halesowen Town (8)	4–1	Stratford Town (7)	611
25	Boston Town (9)	0–4	Leek Town (8)	125
26	Buxton (7)	5–0	Corby Town (8)	
27	Matlock Town (7)	1–2	Kidsgrove Athletic (8)	377
28	Hednesford Town (7)	3–2	Barwell (7)	393
29	Kidderminster Harriers (6)	0–0	Stafford Rangers (7)	950
30	Coalville Town (7)	1–2	Stourbridge (7)	
31	Beaconsfield Town (7)	1–0	Hemel Hempstead Town (6)	
32	Corinthian-Casuals (7)	2–0	Chelmsford City (6)	374
34	Walthamstow (9)	1–1	Abbey Rangers (9)	245
35	Balham (9)	3–5	Royston Town (7)	
36	Tonbridge Angels (6)	1–2	Eastbourne Borough (6)	538
37	Margate (7)	3–1	Concord Rangers (6)	
38	Hendon (7)	3–2	Deeping Rangers (9)	196
39	St Ives Town (7)	0–0	Canvey Island (8)	187
40	Maidstone United (6)	4–1	Cheshunt (7)	1,129
41	Potters Bar Town (7)	2–0	Hornchurch (7)	184
42	Bishop's Stortford (7)	1–2	Peterborough Sports (7)	296
43	Dulwich Hamlet (6)	6–1	Bognor Regis Town (7)	1,689
44	Flackwell Heath (9)	0–3	Slough Town (6)	484
45	Billericay Town (6)	1–0	Basildon United (8)	1,106
46	Tooting & Mitcham United (8)	1–0	Dorking Wanderers (6)	326
47	Hadley (9)	1–0	Ramsgate (8)	
48	Lewes (7)	1–2	Bowers & Pitsea (7)	479
50	Harrow Borough (7)	0–1	Carshalton Athletic (7)	

Tie	Home team (Tier)	Score	Away team (Tier)	Att.
52	Biggleswade Town (7)	1–2	Ware (8)	199
53	Badshot Lea (9)	0–4	Hayes & Yeading United (7)	
54	Lowestoft Town (7)	4–0	Needham Market (7)	495
55	Barton Rovers (8)	0–1	Hitchin Town (7)	
56	Enfield Town (7)	2–0	Braintree Town (6)	
57	Maldon & Tiptree (8)	4–2	Wingate & Finchley (7)	149
58	Moneyfields (8)	0–2	Whyteleafe (8)	
59	Hartley Wintney (7)	0–0	Chichester City (8)	205
60	Horsham (7)	0–2	Dartford (6)	902
61	St Albans City (6)	2–2	Worthing (7)	473
62	Kings Langley (7)	4–0	Folkestone Invicta (7)	335
63	Haringey Borough (7)	5–0	Staines Town (8)	
64	Farnborough (7)	0–5	Wealdstone (6)	404
65	Welling United (6)	7–0	Chipstead (8)	388
66	Chesham United (7)	1–2	Hampton & Richmond Borough (6)	430
67	Weston-super-Mare (7)	2–1	Merthyr Town (7)	
68	Sholing (8)	0–3	Weymouth (6)	515
69	Hereford (6)	5–2	Truro City (7)	1,115
70	Portland United (9)	0–1	Salisbury (7)	
71	Havant & Waterlooville (6)	2–1	Taunton Town (7)	
72	Cirencester Town (8)	2–2	Chippenham Town (6)	
73	Tavistock (9)	4–0	Highworth Town (8)	
74	Tiverton Town (7)	2–4	Bristol Manor Farm (8)	241
75	Poole Town (7)	2–1	Hungerford Town (6)	427
76	Swindon Supermarine (7)	0–4	Bath City (6)	
77	Oxford City (6)	7–0	North Leigh (8)	334
78	Kidlington (8)	0–5	Gloucester City (6)	
79	Brackley Town (6)	4–0	Cinderford Town (8)	
80	Blackfield & Langley (7)	1–0	Dorchester Town (7)	161
Sunday 22 September 2019
49	Cray Wanderers (7)	5–2	Soham Town Rangers (8)	184
51	Biggleswade (8)	1–3	Chertsey Town (8)	
Wednesday 25 September 2019
33	Kingstonian (7)	3–0	March Town United (10)	227
Replays
Tuesday 24 September 2019
3R	Altrincham (6)	1–0	Chester (6)	942
4R	Blyth Spartans (6)	1–0	Curzon Ashton (6)	
8R	Ossett United (8)	0–4	Colne (8)	377
16R	King's Lynn Town (6)	2–1	Alfreton Town (6)	712
18R	Chasetown (8)	1–2 (a.e.t.)	Leamington (6)	339
19R	Sutton Coldfield Town (8)	2–1	Kettering Town (6)	
20R	Witton Albion (7)	0–1 (a.e.t.)	Belper Town (8)	
29R	Stafford Rangers (7)	3–0	Kidderminster Harriers (6)	
34R	Abbey Rangers (9)	2–1	Walthamstow (9)	
39R	Canvey Island (8)	3–2 (a.e.t.)	St Ives Town (7)	
59R	Chichester City (8)	1–0	Hartley Wintney (7)	210
61R	Worthing (7)	1–3	St Albans City (6)	637
72R	Chippenham Town (6)	4–3 (a.e.t.)	Cirencester Town (8)	340

== Third qualifying round ==
Third qualifying round ties took place over the weekend of 5–6 October. The draw was held on 23 September 2019. A total of 80 teams took part in this stage of the competition - the winners from the previous round only with no new teams added to the competition this round. Three teams from Level 9 - Abbey Rangers, Hadley, and Tavistock - advanced to the third qualifying round and were the lowest-ranked teams remaining in the competition.

Tie	Home team (Tier)	Score	Away team (Tier)	Att.
Saturday 5 October 2019
1	Ashton United (7)	2–6	Spennymoor Town (6)	
2	Halesowen Town (8)	0–2	Altrincham (6)	1,235
3	Hednesford Town (7)	4–2	Blyth Spartans (6)	616
4	Nantwich Town (7)	1–0	Morpeth Town (7)	476
5	Peterborough Sports (7)	1–0	Guiseley (6)	
6	Leek Town (8)	0–2	King's Lynn Town (6)	790
7	Whitby Town (7)	1–1	Gloucester City (6)	581
8	Kidsgrove Athletic (8)	0–1	Gateshead (6)	322
9	Stourbridge (7)	2–1	Stafford Rangers (7)	1,048
10	Belper Town (8)	2–1	Rushall Olympic (7)	528
11	Buxton (7)	1–2	York City (6)	901
12	Tamworth (7)	0–0	Hereford (6)	1,206
13	Dunston (8)	2–3	Colne (8)	586
14	Farsley Celtic (6)	0–5	Southport (6)	411
15	Leamington (6)	0–2	Darlington (6)	605
16	Sutton Coldfield Town (8)	0–1	Boston United (6)	497
17	Brackley Town (6)	2–0	Warrington Town (7)	452
18	Oxford City (6)	2–0	Hampton & Richmond Borough (6)	347
19	Lowestoft Town (7)	1–2	Carshalton Athletic (7)	500
20	Dulwich Hamlet (6)	3–0	Eastbourne Borough (6)	1,834
21	Canvey Island (8)	1–1	Bowers & Pitsea (7)	387
22	Bristol Manor Farm (8)	0–0	Wealdstone (6)	422
23	Kingstonian (7)	1–1	Weston-super-Mare (7)	358
24	Haringey Borough (7)	1–0	Cray Wanderers (7)	344

Tie	Home team (Tier)	Score	Away team (Tier)	Att.
25	Welling United (6)	4–1	Tavistock (9)	491
26	Maldon & Tiptree (8)	6–1	Chertsey Town (8)	225
27	Chippenham Town (6)	3–3	Slough Town (6)	606
28	Salisbury (7)	2–4	Margate (7)	743
29	Abbey Rangers (9)	0–2	Whyteleafe (8)	272
30	Kings Langley (7)	3–0	Corinthian-Casuals (7)	
31	Ware (8)	1–2	Potters Bar Town (7)	387
32	Hayes & Yeading United (7)	5–4	Hendon (7)	289
33	Royston Town (7)	2–1	Beaconsfield Town (7)	407
34	Tooting & Mitcham United (8)	0–2	Poole Town (7)	434
35	Havant & Waterlooville (6)	3–0	Hadley (9)	
36	Billericay Town (6)	4–2	Bath City (6)	678
37	Blackfield & Langley (7)	1–4	Dartford (6)	295
38	Weymouth (6)	4–1	St Albans City (6)	974
39	Chichester City (8)	1–0	Enfield Town (7)	515
40	Maidstone United (6)	2–1	Hitchin Town (7)	1,258
Replays
Monday 7 October 2019
7R	Gloucester City (6)	1–3	Whitby Town (7)	273
Tuesday 8 October 2019
12R	Hereford (6)	0–0 (1–3 p)	Tamworth (7)	1,271
21R	Bowers & Pitsea (7)	1–1 (5–3 p)	Canvey Island (8)	452
22R	Wealdstone (6)	4–0	Bristol Manor Farm (8)	524
23R	Weston-super-Mare (7)	1–4	Kingstonian (7)	272
27R	Slough Town (6)	2–3	Chippenham Town (6)	631

== Fourth qualifying round ==
The 40 winners from the third qualifying round were joined by the 24 clubs at level 5 for 32 ties. The draw was made on 7 October 2019. The round contained five teams from Level 8 - Colne, Belper Town, Whyteleafe, Chichester City and Maldon & Tiptree, the lowest-ranked teams remaining in the competition.

Tie	Home team (Tier)	Score	Away team (Tier)	Att.
Saturday 19 October 2019
1	Hednesford Town (7)	0–1	Boston United (6)	891
2	Gateshead (6)	5–0	Colne (8)	878
3	Barrow (5)	0–1	Solihull Moors (5)	1,523
4	Whitby Town (7)	1–1	Stourbridge (7)	1,171
5	Hartlepool United (5)	1–0	Brackley Town (6)	2,506
6	Nantwich Town (7)	1–0	King's Lynn Town (6)	742
7	Chorley (5)	2–0	Spennymoor Town (6)	859
8	Southport (6)	1–3	Altrincham (6)	1,507
9	Tamworth (7)	0–3	Darlington (6)	1,358
10	York City (6)	2–0	Stockport County (5)	2,870
11	Notts County (5)	2–1	Belper Town (8)	5,729
12	Chesterfield (5)	1–1	Wrexham (5)	2,199
13	FC Halifax Town (5)	1–2	Harrogate Town (5)	1,241
14	AFC Fylde (5)	6–1	Peterborough Sports (7)	657
15	Whyteleafe (8)	0–3	Chippenham Town (6)	512
16	Haringey Borough (7)	A–A	Yeovil Town (5)	
Match was abandoned in the second-half after alleged racism towards the Haringey goalkeeper from the fans behind the goal. Yeovil had just scored the only goal of the game prior to the incident. It was later announced the match would be replayed on 29 October.
17	Havant & Waterlooville (6)	1–2	Dulwich Hamlet (6)	826
18	Ebbsfleet United (5)	1–1	Woking (5)	750
19	Welling United (6)	0–0	Eastleigh (5)	511
20	Bromley (5)	4–3	Aldershot Town (5)	1,408
21	Maidstone United (6)	4–1	Kings Langley (7)	1,441
22	Maidenhead United (5)	1–1	Wealdstone (6)	891

Tie	Home team (Tier)	Score	Away team (Tier)	Att.
23	Oxford City (6)	2–1	Margate (7)	442
24	Bowers & Pitsea (7)	1–2	Chichester City (8)	531
25	Hayes & Yeading United (7)	1–1	Poole Town (7)	416
26	Royston Town (7)	1–3	Maldon & Tiptree (8)	1,152
27	Potters Bar Town (7)	1–1	Barnet (5)	2,011
28	Torquay United (5)	3–2	Boreham Wood (5)	1,952
29	Sutton United (5)	1–1	Billericay Town (6)	789
30	Weymouth (6)	1–2	Dover Athletic (5)	1,506
31	Dartford (6)	2–3	Kingstonian (7)	850
32	Carshalton Athletic (7)	2–1	Dagenham & Redbridge (5)	726
Tuesday 29 October 2019
16	Haringey Borough (7)	0–3	Yeovil Town (5)	857
Replays
Monday 21 October 2019
4R	Stourbridge (7)	3–2	Whitby Town (7)	1,092
Tuesday 22 October 2019
12R	Wrexham (5)	1–0	Chesterfield (5)	2,023
18R	Woking (5)	0–1	Ebbsfleet United (5)	942
19R	Eastleigh (5)	4–2	Welling United (6)	803
22R	Wealdstone (6)	0–2	Maidenhead United (5)	835
25R	Poole Town (7)	2–3	Hayes & Yeading United (7)	1,066
27R	Barnet (5)	3–1	Potters Bar Town (7)	1,466
29R	Billericay Town (6)	5–2	Sutton United (5)	1,113

== Competition proper ==
32 winners from the fourth qualifying round advance to the First round proper, where 47 teams from League One (Level 3) and League Two (Level 4) of English football, operating in the English Football League, enter the competition. The first round will include Maldon & Tiptree F.C. from level 8, while Chichester City F.C., also from level 8, received the first round bye due to the expulsion of Bury F.C. from the FA Cup, and will progress directly to the second round.

== Broadcasting rights ==
The qualifying rounds are not covered by the FA Cup's broadcasting contracts held by BBC Sport and BT Sport, although one game per round will be broadcast by the BBC on its media platforms.

Round	Tie	Broadcaster
extra preliminary round	Punjab United vs Broadbridge Heath	BBC Sport
Preliminary round	Heather St John's vs Worcester City	BBC Sport
First qualifying round	Thatcham Town vs Salisbury	BBC Sport
Second qualifying round	Irlam vs York City	BBC Sport
Third qualifying round	Halesowen Town vs Altrincham	BBC Sport
Fourth qualifying round	Potters Bar Town vs Barnet	BBC Sport
Fourth qualifying round	York City vs Stockport County	BT Sport
