= 2020–21 FA Cup qualifying rounds =

Tournament details
- Country: England; Wales
- Teams: 644

The 2020–21 FA Cup qualifying rounds opened the 140th season of The Football Association Challenge Cup (FA Cup), the world's oldest association football single knockout competition, organised by The Football Association, the governing body for the sport in England (though the competition also features teams from Wales). The 32 winning teams from the fourth qualifying round progressed to the First round proper.

The FA made 737 places available in the FA Cup for the 2020–21 season, an increase in two on the previous season, due to the need to produce an extra qualifier in the second qualifying round, following a shortfall in teams at step 2 of the National League System. Following the liquidation of Macclesfield Town, 736 teams ultimately entered the competition. The 92 teams from the EFL and Premier League received direct entry to the competition proper. The remaining 644 teams, from the National League System (levels 5–10 of the English football league system), entered into the qualifying competition consisting of six rounds of preliminary (2) and qualifying (4) knockout matches.

With 889 eligible entrants, more than the number of places available, teams from level 10 of the English football league system were accepted up to the point at which the 737 places were full, based on a random draw. This reflected the cancellation of level 10 leagues in 2019–20 due to the COVID-19 pandemic, and thus the absence of league placings on which to base qualification, as had been used in previous seasons. The pandemic also led to the removal of replays from the qualifying competition, in order to fit with a delayed start following the extended 2019–20 football season, and a reduction in the prize fund, with figures returning to those last used in the 2017–18 season.

== Calendar ==
Planned dates for the early qualifying rounds were released to clubs in the National League System in late July, and confirmed by the FA on 3 August 2020. With replays removed from qualifying, several rounds were scheduled for Tuesdays rather than the usual Saturday.

Round	Main date	Leagues entering at this round	New entries this round	Winners from previous round	Number of fixtures	Prize fund	
Round	Main date	Leagues entering at this round	New entries this round	Winners from previous round	Number of fixtures	Losing club	Winning club
Extra preliminary round	1 September 2020	Levels 8–10	368	none	184	£375	£1,125
Preliminary round	12 September 2020	Level 7 (lowest ranked clubs); Level 8	136	184	160	£481	£1,444
First qualifying round	22 September 2020	Level 7	74	160	117	£750	£2,250
Second qualifying round	3 October 2020	National League North; National League South	43	117	80	£1,125	£3,375
Third qualifying round	13 October 2020	none	0	80	40	£1,875	£5,625
Fourth qualifying round	24 October 2020	National League	23	40	31	£3,125	£9,375

== Extra preliminary round ==
Extra preliminary round fixtures were played on 31 August – 3 September 2020. The draw was made on 18 August 2020. A total of 368 teams, from Level 8, Level 9 and Level 10 of English football, entered at this stage of the competition, 20 of which were making their first appearance in the competition. This round included 74 teams from Level 10, the lowest-ranked teams in the competition.

Tie	Home team (Tier)	Score	Away team (Tier)	Att.
Monday 31 August 2020
97	Woodford Town (9)	3–1	London Colney (9)	247
Tuesday 1 September 2020
1	Penrith (9)	3–2	Pickering Town (8)	161
2	Northallerton Town (9)	1–4	Billingham Town (9)	194
3	Sunderland RCA (9)	3–1	Durham City (10)	170
4	Whickham (9)	0–0 (2–4 p)	West Allotment Celtic (10)	156
5	Thornaby (9)	2–0	Bridlington Town (9)	260
8	Glasshoughton Welfare (10)	1–1 (2–4 p)	Knaresborough Town (9)	272
9	Hebburn Town (9)	4–1	Hemsworth Miners Welfare (9)	263
10	Consett (9)	3–2	Ryhope Colliery Welfare (9)	269
11	Marske United (8)	3–0	North Shields (9)	251
13	Garforth Town (9)	0–3	Whitley Bay (9)	226
14	Newcastle Benfield (9)	1–1 (4–3 p)	Seaham Red Star (9)	176
15	Ashington (9)	2–1	Goole (9)	300
18	1874 Northwich (9)	1–6	Warrington Rylands 1906 (9)	
20	Longridge Town (9)	2–1	Winsford United (9)	
21	Wythenshawe Amateurs (10)	1–1 (4–2 p)	Shelley (10)	
23	Runcorn Town (9)	2–1	Thackley (9)	
25	Eccleshill United (9)	0–3	Silsden (9)	
26	AFC Darwen (10)	2–4	Barnoldswick Town (9)	
27	Northwich Victoria (9)	1–0	Padiham (9)	
28	Skelmersdale United (9)	3–2	Penistone Church (9)	
29	Daisy Hill (10)	0–2	Colne (8)	
31	Athersley Recreation (9)	1–4	Charnock Richard (9)	284
32	Irlam (9)	2–1	Liversedge (9)	
33	Maine Road (10)	0–5	Squires Gate (9)	
34	Congleton Town (9)	1–1 (3–2 p)	Burscough (9)	
35	Hanley Town (9)	3–1	Lye Town (9)	
36	Rugby Town (9)	0–2	Worcester City (9)	
37	Sporting Khalsa (9)	2–1	Boldmere St Michaels (9)	
38	Highgate United (9)	0–3	AFC Bridgnorth (10)	
39	Stourport Swifts (9)	1–3	Coventry United (9)	
40	Gresley Rovers (9)	2–0	Wellington (10)	
41	Stone Old Alleynians (10)	0–0 (1–4 p)	Tividale (9)	
42	Bewdley Town (10)	1–5	OJM Black Country (10)	
43	Romulus (9)	0–0 (3–4 p)	Coventry Sphinx (9)	
44	Chelmsley Town (10)	0–3	Shifnal Town (10)	
45	Westfields (9)	2–0	Brocton (10)	
46	Heather St John's (9)	0–1	Walsall Wood (9)	
47	Whitchurch Alport (9)	3–1	Haughmond (9)	
48	Racing Club Warwick (9)	3–0	AFC Wulfrunians (9)	
49	Anstey Nomads (9)	3–0	Sleaford Town (9)	195
50	Lutterworth Town (9)	2–0	Staveley Miners Welfare (9)	184
53	Radford (10)	1–1 (3–4 p)	Shepshed Dynamo (9)	
54	Spalding United (8)	1–3	Barton Town (9)	
55	Quorn (9)	2–0	Melton Town (10)	150
56	AFC Mansfield (9)	2–1	Sherwood Colliery (10)	
58	Long Eaton United (9)	3–1	Grimsby Borough (9)	
59	Newark (9)	4–0	Deeping Rangers (9)	
60	Maltby Main (9)	2–1	Handsworth (9)	
62	West Bridgford (10)	1–1 (5–3 p)	Dunkirk (10)	
63	Leicester Nirvana (9)	1–3	GNG Oadby Town (9)	145
64	Long Melford (9)	3–2	Northampton ON Chenecks (9)	
65	Whitton United (9)	4–3	Ipswich Wanderers (10)	150
66	Newmarket Town (9)	w/o (Note: Newmarket Town were awarded a walkover due to a Walsham-le-Willows player testing positive for COVID-19, forcing them to forfeit.)	Walsham-le-Willows (9)	
67	Hadleigh United (9)	3–4	Mildenhall Town (9)	126
68	Peterborough Northern Star (9)	0–1	Potton United (9)	97
69	Kirkley & Pakefield (9)	1–2	Cogenhoe United (9)	
70	Diss Town (10)	1–0	Framlingham Town (10)	166
71	Thetford Town (9)	2–0	Wellingborough Town (9)	137
73	Burton Park Wanderers (10)	w/o (Note: AFC Sudbury were awarded a walkover due to a Burton Park Wanderers player testing positive for COVID-19, forcing them to forfeit.)	AFC Sudbury (8)	
74	Gorleston (9)	5–0	Swaffham Town (9)	205
75	Haverhill Rovers (9)	2–1	Norwich United (9)	212
76	Eynesbury Rovers (9)	7–3	Desborough Town (9)	132
77	Wellingborough Whitworth (10)	1–6	Harborough Town (9)	
78	Woodbridge Town (9)	2–2 (6–7 p)	Biggleswade United (9)	
79	Stowmarket Town (9)	2–1	Rothwell Corinthians (9)	232
80	Wroxham (9)	5–0	Arlesey Town (9)	235
82	Redbridge (9)	0–2	Harpenden Town (9)	134
84	Harlow Town (8)	5–1	Enfield (9)	
85	Clapton (9)	2–2 (5–6 p)	Sporting Bengal United (9)	0
86	Hoddesdon Town (9)	1–2	FC Clacton (9)	
87	New Salamis (10)	1–0	Colney Heath (9)	236
88	Southend Manor (9)	0–5	Ware (8)	200
89	Walthamstow (9)	3–2	Maccabi London Lions (10)	292
90	Saffron Walden Town (9)	4–2	Little Oakley (10)	276
92	Stansted (9)	3–2	Takeley (9)	
93	Cockfosters (9)	4–2	Stanway Rovers (9)	
94	Hullbridge Sports (8)	0–2	Hadley (9)	
95	Sawbridgeworth Town (9)	2–1	Romford (8)	
96	Brantham Athletic (9)	1–1 (3–2 p)	Benfleet (10)	84
100	Oxhey Jets (9)	1–0	Bishop's Cleeve (9)	110
101	Clanfield (10)	0–1	Long Crendon (10)	
102	Leverstock Green (9)	3–1	Wembley (9)	111
103	Tuffley Rovers (9)	2–5	Harefield United (9)	144
104	Holmer Green (9)	3–2	Shrivenham (9)	140
105	Winslow United (10)	2–1	Newport Pagnell Town (9)	285
106	Cribbs (9)	3–1	Newent Town (10)	
107	Easington Sports (9)	2–0	Tring Athletic (9)	90
108	Aylesbury Vale Dynamos (9)	1–2	Windsor (9)	143
109	Ardley United (9)	0–0 (5–6 p)	Edgware Town (9)	123
110	Lydney Town (9)	0–1	Fairford Town (9)	
111	Risborough Rangers (10)	4–1	Longlevens (9)	180
112	Leighton Town (9)	3–0	Abingdon United (10)	129
Match played at Barton Rovers

Tie	Home team (Tier)	Score	Away team (Tier)	Att.
113	AFC Dunstable (8)	4–0	Hallen (9)	
115	Royal Wootton Bassett Town (9)	2–2 (4–1 p)	Chipping Sodbury Town (9)	
116	Burnham (9)	0–0 (5–3 p)	Cheltenham Saracens (10)	
118	North Greenford United (9)	1–2	Brimscombe & Thrupp (9)	118
119	CB Hounslow United (9)	6–1	Banstead Athletic (9)	
120	East Preston (9)	0–2	Chatham Town (9)	
121	Billingshurst (10)	0–2	Westside (10)	
122	Lordswood (9)	2–3	Hanworth Villa (9)	
123	Molesey (9)	0–7	Southall (9)	
124	AFC Croydon Athletic (9)	0–3	Sutton Common Rovers (9)	
125	Glebe (9)	1–3	Whyteleafe (8)	
126	Broadbridge Heath (9)	3–1	Raynes Park Vale (9)	
127	Alfold (9)	9–1	Shoreham (10)	
128	Saltdean United (9)	1–3	Eastbourne Town (9)	
130	Kennington (10)	0–1	Erith & Belvedere (9)	
131	Langney Wanderers (9)	3–1	Tower Hamlets (9)	
133	Abbey Rangers (9)	3–1	Welling Town (9)	
134	Oakwood (10)	0–2	Cobham (9)	
135	Tunbridge Wells (9)	1–0	Erith Town (9)	
136	Newhaven (9)	1–1 (4–2 p)	Lingfield (9)	
137	Broadfields United (9)	3–0	Loxwood (9)	75
138	Crowborough Athletic (9)	3–4	Crawley Down Gatwick (9)	
139	Redhill (9)	w/o (Note: Egham Town were awarded a walkover due to a Redhill player testing positive for COVID-19, forcing them to forfeit.)	Egham Town (9)	
140	Fisher (9)	2–0	Horsham YMCA (9)	
141	Corinthian (9)	2–1	Sheerwater (9)	
143	K Sports (9)	0–2	Steyning Town (9)	
144	AFC Uckfield Town (9)	0–1	Little Common (9)	
146	Lancing (9)	3–3 (10–11 p)	Phoenix Sports (8)	
147	Eastbourne United Association (9)	0–1	Horley Town (9)	
149	Knaphill (9)	0–4	Deal Town (9)	
150	Bearsted (9)	3–5	Peacehaven & Telscombe (9)	
151	Spelthorne Sports (9)	1–0	Virginia Water (9)	
152	Sheppey United (9)	1–0	Sutton Athletic (10)	
153	Pagham (9)	2–1	Fleet Town (9)	
154	Corsham Town (10)	2–2 (4–3 p)	Farnham Town (10)	
155	Hamworthy United (9)	3–0	Calne Town (10)	
156	Badshot Lea (9)	4–0	Amesbury Town (9)	
157	Hamble Club (9)	2–1	Reading City (9)	
158	Frimley Green (9)	1–0	Fareham Town (9)	
159	Bashley (9)	8–2	Whitchurch United (10)	
160	Brockenhurst (9)	0–1	Lymington Town (9)	
162	Cowes Sports (9)	1–0	Totton & Eling (10)	
163	Basingstoke Town (8)	1–1 (5–4 p)	Bournemouth (9)	
Match played at Reading City
164	Camberley Town (9)	0–0 (5–4 p)	Blackfield & Langley (9)	
165	Shaftesbury (9)	2–2 (5–6 p)	Fawley (10)	
166	Tadley Calleva (9)	1–0	Alresford Town (9)	
168	Bemerton Heath Harlequins (10)	2–1	Horndean (9)	
169	Christchurch (9)	1–1 (7–6 p)	Ascot United (9)	
170	AFC Portchester (9)	4–0	Sandhurst Town (10)	
171	Keynsham Town (9)	1–3	Exmouth Town (9)	
173	Odd Down (9)	1–4	Helston Athletic (10)	117
174	Buckland Athletic (9)	1–1 (3–5 p)	Bitton (9)	
175	Wells City (10)	2–0	Bovey Tracey (10)	
177	Shepton Mallet (9)	3–0	Torrington (10)	
178	Wellington (9)	2–2 (3–4 p)	Bodmin Town (10)	
179	Plymouth Parkway (9)	1–1 (4–5 p)	Saltash United (10)	
180	Millbrook (10)	0–1	Bridgwater Town (9)	
181	Portland United (9)	0–1	Clevedon Town (9)	139
183	Brislington (9)	0–2	Cadbury Heath (9)	
184	Newton Abbot Spurs (10)	3–0	AFC St Austell (10)	
Wednesday 2 September 2020
6	Crook Town (10)	1–1 (5–4 p)	Yorkshire Amateur (9)	219
7	Guisborough Town (9)	1–0	Newton Aycliffe (9)	236
12	Stockton Town (9)	3–0	Shildon (9)	300
16	Heaton Stannington (10)	2–3	West Auckland Town (9)	261
17	Bishop Auckland (9)	1–0	Hall Road Rangers (10)	263
22	Avro (9)	1–2	Bootle (9)	
24	Litherland REMYCA (9)	3–0	Ashton Athletic (9)	
30	Campion (10)	0–1	Albion Sports (9)	
51	Carlton Town (8)	1–1 (4–2 p)	Loughborough University (9)	
52	Bottesford Town (9)	2–1	Selston (9)	150
57	Holbeach United (9)	1–0	Kirby Muxloe (10)	
61	Blackstones (10)	2–3	Boston Town (9)	
72	Pinchbeck United (9)	0–4	St Neots Town (8)	
81	Godmanchester Rovers (9)	1–1 (2–4 p)	Ely City (9)	
83	Park View (10)	1–2	Hashtag United (9)	210
91	Baldock Town (9)	2–2 (2–4 p)	St Margaretsbury (9)	140
98	West Essex (9)	6–3	Crawley Green (9)	152
Match played at Redbridge
99	Ilford (9)	1–3	Halstead Town (10)	
114	Roman Glass St George (9)	1–2	Flackwell Heath (9)	
117	Dunstable Town (9)	1–1 (4–3 p)	Thame Rangers (10)	137
129	Colliers Wood United (9)	0–1	Hollands & Blair (9)	
132	Stansfeld (10)	3–3 (4–3 p)	Punjab United (9)	
142	Guildford City (9)	3–2	Canterbury City (9)	
145	Mile Oak (10)	0–4	Beckenham Town (9)	
148	Balham (9)	2–2 (3–5 p)	Hassocks (9)	
161	Baffins Milton Rovers (9)	1–2	AFC Stoneham (9)	
167	Westbury United (9)	0–2	Binfield (9)	
172	Tavistock (9)	2–0	Bradford Town (9)	
176	Willand Rovers (8)	2–1	Bridport (9)	
182	Sherborne Town (10)	2–1	Street (9)	
Thursday 3 September 2020
19	St Helens Town (10)	1–1 (5–4 p)	Cammell Laird 1907 (10)	

== Preliminary round ==
This draw was also made on 18 August 2020, and saw another 136 clubs joining the 184 winners from the previous round. Ties were played between Friday, 11 September and Monday, 14 September 2020. This round included 26 teams from Level 10, the lowest-ranked teams left in the competition.

Tie	Home team (Tier)	Score	Away team (Tier)	Att.
Friday 11 September 2020
85	New Salamis (10)	5–1	West Essex (9)	315
Saturday 12 September 2020
1	Whitley Bay (9)	w/o (Note: Whitley Bay were awarded a walkover due to a Dunston player testing positive for COVID-19, forcing them to forfeit.)	Dunston (8)	
2	Penrith (9)	1–3	West Allotment Celtic (10)	
3	Kendal Town (8)	0–5	Bishop Auckland (9)	
4	West Auckland Town (9)	3–3 (3–0 p)	Ashington (9)	
5	Billingham Town (9)	1–2	Stockton Town (9)	300
Match played at Stockton Town
6	Knaresborough Town (9)	1–3	Workington (8)	225
7	Crook Town (10)	0–2	Marske United (8)	
8	Thornaby (9)	0–2	Sunderland RCA (9)	
9	Frickley Athletic (8)	3–1	Newcastle Benfield (9)	
10	Hebburn Town (9)	2–2 (4–5 p)	Pontefract Collieries (8)	
11	Guisborough Town (9)	1–2	Tadcaster Albion (8)	
12	Consett (9)	2–2 (5–4 p)	Ossett United (8)	
13	Congleton Town (9)	1–2	Skelmersdale United (9)	
14	Glossop North End (8)	0–3	City of Liverpool (8)	
15	Ramsbottom United (8)	4–1	Irlam (9)	
16	Ashton United (7)	2–0	Squires Gate (9)	
17	Wythenshawe Amateurs (10)	1–4	Trafford (8)	
18	Runcorn Linnets (8)	2–0	Albion Sports (9)	384
19	Droylsden (8)	w/o (Note: Droylsden withdrew from competition)	Litherland REMYCA (9)	
20	Silsden (9)	2–5	Bootle (9)	
21	Mossley (8)	3–0	St Helens Town (10)	
22	Stocksbridge Park Steels (8)	1–3	Stalybridge Celtic (7)	
23	Northwich Victoria (9)	2–2 (4–5 p)	Charnock Richard (9)	294
24	Colne (8)	0–2	Prescot Cables (8)	
25	Runcorn Town (9)	1–1 (5–4 p)	Brighouse Town (8)	
26	Warrington Rylands 1906 (9)	1–0	Clitheroe (8)	
27	Marine (8)	2–1	Barnoldswick Town (9)	
28	Widnes (8)	2–3	Longridge Town (9)	
29	Worcester City (9)	2–1	Walsall Wood (9)	
30	OJM Black Country (10)	0–1	Matlock Town (7)	
31	Coventry Sphinx (9)	0–0 (4–3 p)	Coleshill Town (8)	
32	Sutton Coldfield Town (8)	0–1	Belper Town (8)	249
33	Kidsgrove Athletic (8)	0–1	Chasetown (8)	327
34	Leek Town (8)	2–1	Sporting Khalsa (9)	400
35	Westfields (9)	2–0	Whitchurch Alport (9)	227
36	Racing Club Warwick (9)	1–1 (2–3 p)	Bedworth United (8)	
37	Market Drayton Town (8)	0–1	Tividale (9)	121
38	Newcastle Town (8)	1–2	Halesowen Town (8)	
39	Evesham United (8)	w/o (Note: Evesham United were awarded a walkover due to numerous Coventry United players testing positive for COVID-19, forcing them to forfeit.)	Coventry United (9)	
40	Hanley Town (9)	5–1	Gresley Rovers (9)	
41	Shifnal Town (10)	4–1	AFC Bridgnorth (10)	
42	Cleethorpes Town (8)	0–1	AFC Mansfield (9)	
43	Boston Town (9)	0–3	Coalville Town (7)	
44	Anstey Nomads (9)	1–2	Worksop Town (8)	
45	Holbeach United (9)	0–4	Sheffield (8)	
46	Quorn (9)	2–0	Barton Town (9)	
47	Maltby Main (9)	0–4	Newark (9)	241
48	West Bridgford (10)	w/o (Note: West Bridgford were awarded a walkover due to eight Lincoln United players testing positive for COVID-19, forcing them to forfeit.)	Lincoln United (8)	
49	Ilkeston Town (8)	3–0	Shepshed Dynamo (9)	
50	Long Eaton United(9)	1–1 (4–2 p)	Bottesford Town (9)	
51	GNG Oadby Town (9)	w/o (Note: Carlton Town were awarded a walkover due to a GNG Oadby Town player testing positive for COVID-19, forcing them to forfeit.)	Carlton Town (8)	
52	Lutterworth Town (9)	0–6	Loughborough Dynamo (8)	
53	Wroxham (9)	3–1	Gorleston (9)	
54	Biggleswade (8)	1–0	Histon (8)	
55	Cambridge City (8)	4–0	Biggleswade United (9)	293
56	Yaxley (8)	1–2	Stowmarket Town (9)	
57	Mildenhall Town (9)	1–1 (4–3 p)	Corby Town (8)	
58	Ely City (9)	3–1	Eynesbury Rovers (9)	
59	Stamford (8)	4–0	Diss Town (10)	
60	Thetford Town (9)	0–2	Potton United (9)	138
61	Dereham Town (8)	3–2	Whitton United (9)	171
62	Daventry Town (8)	1–0	Bedford Town (8)	
63	AFC Sudbury (8)	4–2	Harborough Town (9)	179
64	Haverhill Rovers (9)	4–3	Wisbech Town (8)	
65	Cogenhoe United (9)	0–1	Bury Town (8)	
66	Long Melford (9)	0–0 (4–2 p)	Kempston Rovers (8)	132
67	Soham Town Rangers (8)	3–2	St Neots Town (8)	203
68	Royston Town (7)	6–0	Newmarket Town (9)	
69	Great Wakering Rovers (8)	0–1	Brantham Athletic (9)	125
70	Welwyn Garden City (8)	2–0	Saffron Walden Town (9)	
71	Grays Athletic (8)	1–0	Witham Town (8)	223
72	Coggeshall Town (8)	2–0	Tilbury (8)	171
73	Walthamstow (9)	1–1 (3–2 p)	Cockfosters (9)	
74	Sawbridgeworth Town (9)	1–3	St Margaretsbury (9)	
75	FC Romania (8)	0–1	Brentwood Town (8)	78
76	Barking (8)	2–0	Heybridge Swifts (8)	129
77	FC Clacton (9)	1–1 (10–9 p)	Hadley (9)	
78	Hertford Town (8)	0–1	Maldon & Tiptree (8)	230
79	Bowers & Pitsea (7)	5–1	Barton Rovers (8)	155

Tie	Home team (Tier)	Score	Away team (Tier)	Att.
80	Stansted (9)	2–0	Basildon United (8)	171
81	Harlow Town (8)	3–0	Sporting Bengal United (9)	157
82	Harpenden Town (9)	0–3	Aveley (8)	
83	Canvey Island (8)	2–0	Ware (8)	216
84	Leiston (7)	5–0	Halstead Town (10)	
87	Waltham Abbey (8)	1–0	Woodford Town (9)	178
88	Oxhey Jets (9)	0–1	Chalfont St Peter (8)	
89	Aylesbury United (8)	3–0	Long Crendon (10)	
90	Risborough Rangers (10)	2–1	Winslow United (10)	280
91	Flackwell Heath (9)	0–3	Cirencester Town (8)	
92	Didcot Town (8)	1–2	Royal Wootton Bassett Town (9)	
93	Holmer Green (9)	0–2	Highworth Town (8)	
94	Dunstable Town (9)	1–1 (7–6 p)	Easington Sports (9)	138
95	Kidlington (8)	1–0	Thame United (8)	
96	Cribbs (9)	2–0	Berkhamsted (8)	
97	Harefield United (9)	1–2	Leighton Town (9)	
98	Brimscombe & Thrupp (9)	1–2	Cinderford Town (8)	177
99	Fairford Town (9)	2–2 (4–2 p)	Edgware Town (9)	
100	Northwood (8)	1–1 (4–2 p)	Slimbridge AFC (8)	
101	Wantage Town (8)	3–2	Windsor (9)	
102	Marlow (8)	2–0	North Leigh (8)	
103	Thatcham Town (8)	1–5	AFC Dunstable (8)	
104	Leverstock Green (9)	1–4	Burnham (9)	
105	Tunbridge Wells (9)	1–1 (4–1 p)	Beckenham Town (9)	
106	Cray Valley Paper Mills (8)	6–0	VCD Athletic (8)	
107	Hanwell Town (8)	4–1	Spelthorne Sports (9)	
108	Sevenoaks Town (8)	A–A (Note: Match abandoned at half-time due to allegations of discrimination, with score at 3–0.)	CB Hounslow United (9)	
109	Southall (9)	2–1	Ashford Town (8)	
110	Chertsey Town (8)	2–0	Abbey Rangers (9)	
111	Staines Town (8)	2–1	Guildford City (9)	
112	East Grinstead Town (8)	3–2	Phoenix Sports (8)	
113	Langney Wanderers (9)	1–1 (2–3 p)	Harrow Borough (7)	
114	Hastings United (8)	1–0	Herne Bay (8)	
115	Ramsgate (8)	0–3	Chipstead (8)	
116	Sutton Common Rovers (9)	4–0	Broadfields United (9)	
117	Carshalton Athletic (7)	5–1	Whitstable Town (8)	
118	Bedfont Sports (8)	3–1	Hassocks (9)	
119	Deal Town (9)	4–1	Sittingbourne (8)	287
120	Newhaven (9)	1–2	Corinthian (9)	
121	Erith & Belvedere (9)	1–1 (4–3 p)	Alfold (9)	
122	Kingstonian (7)	4–1	Horley Town (9)	
123	Westside (10)	0–2	Chatham Town (9)	
124	Cobham (9)	1–1 (4–3 p)	Three Bridges (8)	
125	Whyteleafe (8)	4–0	Peacehaven & Telscombe (9)	
126	Egham Town (9)	1–3	Crawley Down Gatwick (9)	
127	Steyning Town (9)	2–1	Hanworth Villa (9)	
128	Broadbridge Heath (9)	w/o (Note: Haywards Heath Town were awarded a walkover due to three Broadbridge Heath players testing positive for COVID-19, forcing them to forfeit.)	Haywards Heath Town (8)	
129	Sheppey United (9)	4–1	Uxbridge (8)	
130	Hythe Town (8)	1–2	South Park (8)	
131	Tooting & Mitcham United (8)	2–2 (1–3 p)	Fisher (9)	
132	Stansfeld O&BC (10)	2–3	Little Common (9)	
133	Faversham Town (8)	1–1 (6–5 p)	Eastbourne Town (9)	
134	Ashford United (8)	2–0	Whitehawk (8)	236
135	Burgess Hill Town (8)	w/o (Note: Burgess Hill Town were awarded a walkover due to Hollands & Blair failing to fulfil the fixture.)	Hollands & Blair (9)	
136	Farnborough (7)	0–0 (4–3 p)	Lymington Town (9)	
138	Hartley Wintney (7)	1–0	Hamworthy United (9)	
139	Bashley (9)	0–2	Christchurch (9)	
140	Westfield (Surrey) (8)	2–2 (3–5 p)	Frimley Green (9)	
142	Moneyfields (8)	4–2	Camberley Town (9)	
143	Winchester City (8)	2–0	Corsham Town (10)	
144	Cowes Sports (9)	1–0	Hamble Club (9)	
145	Badshot Lea (9)	0–2	Bracknell Town (8)	300
146	Binfield (9)	5–1	AFC Totton (8)	
147	Bemerton Heath Harlequins (10)	0–1	Sholing (8)	
148	Wimborne Town (7)	3–0	AFC Portchester (9)	
149	AFC Stoneham (9)	3–0	Pagham (9)	
150	Frome Town (8)	3–0	Bodmin Town (10)	
151	Cadbury Heath (9)	1–5	Bristol Manor Farm (8)	176
152	Exmouth Town (9)	0–2	Melksham Town (8)	
153	Saltash United (10)	1–0	Paulton Rovers (8)	
154	Shepton Mallet (9)	1–0	Willand Rovers (8)	
155	Sherborne Town (10)	1–2	Clevedon Town (9)	
156	Newton Abbot Spurs (10)	0–4	Larkhall Athletic (8)	
157	Bideford (8)	3–0	Wells City (10)	
158	Bridgwater Town (9)	2–3	Bitton (9)	
159	Barnstaple Town (8)	2–0	Helston Athletic (10)	
160	Tavistock (9)	2–1	Mangotsfield United (8)	
Sunday 13 September 2020
86	Hashtag United (9)	1–1 (13–12 p)	Felixstowe & Walton United (8)	300
141	Fawley (10)	0–1	Tadley Calleva (9)	
Monday 14 September 2020
137	Basingstoke Town (8)	2–2 (1–3 p)	Chichester City (8)	

== First qualifying round ==
The draw for the first qualifying round was made on 14 September 2020, and saw another 74 clubs from Level 7 joining the 160 winners from the preliminary round. Ties were played between Monday, 21 September and Wednesday, 23 September 2020. This round included 6 teams from Level 10, the lowest-ranked teams left in the competition.

Tie	Home team (Tier)	Score	Away team (Tier)	Att.
Monday 21 September 2020
50	Hitchin Town (7)	3–0	Needham Market (7)	410
54	Hashtag United (9)	1–1 (4–2 p)	Soham Town Rangers (8)	300
67	New Salamis (10)	1–2	Brentwood Town (8)	300
93	Beaconsfield Town (7)	0–2	Harrow Borough (7)	220
97	Carshalton Athletic (7)	5–0	Faversham Town (8)	334
Tuesday 22 September 2020
1	Sunderland RCA (9)	0–4	Prescot Cables (8)	207
2	Lancaster City (7)	1–0	Runcorn Town (9)	
3	Warrington Town (7)	0–1	South Shields (7)	
4	Marske United (8)	1–0	Trafford (8)	300
5	Mossley (8)	2–1	Ramsbottom United (8)	371
6	West Allotment Celtic (10)	0–5	Hyde United (7)	145
7	Skelmersdale United (9)	2–1	Bootle (9)	
8	West Auckland Town (9)	0–1	Runcorn Linnets (8)	
9	Whitley Bay (9)	3–2	Witton Albion (7)	254
10	Radcliffe (7)	5–3	Workington (8)	309
11	Scarborough Athletic (7)	0–2	Ashton United (7)	0 (Note: Game played behind closed doors due to Borough of Scarborough being on government COVID-19 watchlist)
12	Frickley Athletic (8)	0–1	Marine (8)	202
13	Whitby Town (7)	1–1 (3–4 p)	Warrington Rylands 1906 (9)	0
14	City of Liverpool (8)	0–3	Morpeth Town (7)	
15	Atherton Collieries (7)	w/o (Note: Bamber Bridge withdrew due to a player testing positive for COVID-19.)	Bamber Bridge (7)	
16	Longridge Town (9)	2–0	Charnock Richard (9)	
17	Stalybridge Celtic (7)	3–0	Bishop Auckland (9)	
18	Consett (9)	1–0	Stockton Town (9)	
19	FC United of Manchester (7)	6–2	Pontefract Collieries (8)	534
20	Tadcaster Albion (8)	7–2	Litherland REMYCA (9)	
21	Hednesford Town (7)	3–2	Long Eaton United (9)	
22	Tamworth (7)	3–3 (5–4 p)	Stourbridge (7)	380
24	Quorn (9)	0–2	Matlock Town (7)	
25	Leek Town (8)	1–2	Mickleover (7)	
26	Grantham Town (7)	2–2 (3–1 p)	Rushall Olympic (7)	
27	Nuneaton Borough (7)	2–1	Loughborough Dynamo (8)	
28	Westfields (9)	1–3	Worksop Town (8)	
29	West Bridgford (10)	0–1	Halesowen Town (8)	
30	Coventry Sphinx (9)	0–2	Ilkeston Town (8)	
31	Banbury United (7)	2–0	Carlton Town (8)	
32	Chasetown (8)	2–1	Basford United (7)	266
33	Tividale (9)	2–4	Nantwich Town (7)	
34	Barwell (7)	3–1	Bedworth United (8)	
35	AFC Mansfield (9)	3–0	Gainsborough Trinity (7)	
36	Coalville Town (7)	2–0	Sheffield (8)	
37	Buxton (7)	7–0	Belper Town (8)	317
38	Daventry Town (8)	0–2	Evesham United (8)	
39	AFC Rushden & Diamonds (7)	0–5	Newark (9)	
40	Shifnal Town (10)	0–2	Alvechurch (7)	
41	Bromsgrove Sporting (7)	1–2	Stratford Town (7)	
42	Hanley Town (9)	3–2	Redditch United (7)	
43	Ely City (9)	1–2	Biggleswade (8)	
44	Haverhill Rovers (9)	0–3	Maldon & Tiptree (8)	
45	Walthamstow (9)	0–0 (4–3 p)	St Margaretsbury (9)	
46	Bury Town (8)	2–1	Brightlingsea Regent (7)	400
47	Dereham Town (8)	0–2	Canvey Island (8)	
48	Kings Langley (7)	1–1 (4–2 p)	FC Clacton (9)	
49	Stamford (8)	4–0	AFC Sudbury (8)	
51	Bowers & Pitsea (7)	0–3	Hornchurch (7)	
53	Long Melford (9)	1–3	Cheshunt (7)	
55	Leiston (7)	5–1	Biggleswade Town (7)	
56	Cambridge City (8)	1–1 (4–2 p)	Stowmarket Town (9)	315
57	Lowestoft Town (7)	2–3	Aveley (8)	

Tie	Home team (Tier)	Score	Away team (Tier)	Att.
58	Peterborough Sports (7)	2–2 (5–4 p)	Enfield Town (7)	
59	Potters Bar Town (7)	1–0	East Thurrock United (7)	
60	Harlow Town (8)	0–1	Waltham Abbey (8)	
61	Royston Town (7)	2–0	Wroxham (9)	
62	Leighton Town (9)	4–0	Mildenhall Town (9)	
63	Welwyn Garden City (8)	1–1 (3–4 p)	Bishop's Stortford (7)	
64	Coggeshall Town (8)	0–1	Stansted (9)	170
65	Barking (8)	6–1	Dunstable Town (9)	
66	Brantham Athletic (9)	1–0	St Ives Town (7)	
68	Burnham (9)	1–0	Northwood (8)	
69	Horsham (7)	2–1	Kingstonian (7)	
70	Corinthian (9)	3–1	Sevenoaks Town (8)	
71	Hartley Wintney (7)	5–0	Erith & Belvedere (9)	
72	Whyteleafe (8)	2–0	Binfield (9)	
73	Chipstead (8)	1–1 (4–2 p)	Deal Town (9)	157
74	Staines Town (8)	1–2	Walton Casuals (7)	
75	Frimley Green (9)	1–1 (1–4 p)	Marlow (8)	
76	Little Common (9)	0–3	Corinthian-Casuals (7)	
77	Haringey Borough (7)	5–1	Tunbridge Wells (9)	
78	Haywards Heath Town (8)	0–1	Hanwell Town (8)	
80	Cobham (9)	1–3	Risborough Rangers (10)	
81	Ashford United (8)	1–4	Bracknell Town (8)	
82	Bedfont Sports (8)	3–1	Lewes (7)	
83	Crawley Down Gatwick (9)	1–2	Hendon (7)	
85	Hastings United (8)	0–0 (6–5 p)	Chesham United (7)	
87	Steyning Town (9)	0–5	Sheppey United (9)	
88	East Grinstead Town (8)	3–3 (4–2 p)	Worthing (7)	
89	South Park (8)	2–2 (2–4 p)	Bognor Regis Town (7)	202
90	Merstham (7)	2–2 (6–7 p)	AFC Dunstable (8)	
91	Chertsey Town (8)	0–0 (5–4 p)	Leatherhead (7)	
94	Chatham Town (9)	3–2	Southall (9)	
95	Chalfont St Peter (8)	2–3	Farnborough (7)	178
96	Margate (7)	1–2	Hayes & Yeading United (7)	
99	Fairford Town (9)	1–2	Sholing (8)	150
100	Cinderford Town (8)	2–2 (5–6 p)	Royal Wootton Bassett Town (9)	
101	Chichester City (8)	3–1	Cribbs (9)	274
102	Cowes Sports (9)	0–5	Weston-super-Mare (7)	
104	Aylesbury United (8)	2–2 (3–4 p)	Moneyfields (8)	
105	Taunton Town (7)	5–0	Wantage Town (8)	
106	Winchester City (8)	3–2	Clevedon Town (9)	
109	Tadley Calleva (9)	0–1	Truro City (7)	297
110	Barnstaple Town (8)	2–3	Wimborne Town (7)	
111	Yate Town (7)	1–2	Bristol Manor Farm (8)	
113	Merthyr Town (7)	w/o (Note: Merthyr Town withdrew due to being on Welsh Assembly COVID-19 watchlist.)	Poole Town (7)	
114	Frome Town (8)	4–1	AFC Stoneham (9)	
115	Christchurch (9)	2–1	Dorchester Town (7)	
116	Swindon Supermarine (7)	3–0	Shepton Mallet (9)	
117	Saltash United (10)	3–1	Cirencester Town (8)	
Wednesday 23 September 2020
23	Worcester City (9)	2–3	Stafford Rangers (7)	
52	Grays Athletic (8)	3–1	Potton United (9)	
79	Sutton Common Rovers (9)	1–3	Metropolitan Police (7)	
84	Wingate & Finchley (7)	1–4	Folkestone Invicta (7)	
86	Cray Wanderers (7)	3–1	Fisher (9)	
92	Cray Valley Paper Mills (8)	3–1	Burgess Hill Town (8)	
98	Tavistock (9)	2–2 (3–5 p)	Gosport Borough (7)	
103	Kidlington (8)	1–1 (4–2 p)	Salisbury (7)	
107	Larkhall Athletic (8)	3–2	Bitton (9)	221
108	Tiverton Town (7)	2–0	Bideford (8)	
112	Highworth Town (8)	1–1 (4–5 p)	Melksham Town (8)	

== Second qualifying round ==
The draw for the second qualifying round was made on 25 September 2020, and saw 43 clubs from Level 6 joining the 117 winners from the first qualifying round. Ties were played between Saturday, 3 October and Monday, 5 October 2020. This round included two teams from Level 10, Saltash United and Risborough Rangers, the lowest-ranked teams left in the competition.

Tie	Home team (Tier)	Score	Away team (Tier)	Att.
Saturday 3 October 2020
1	Guiseley (6)	4–0	Atherton Collieries (7)	0
2	Mossley (8)	1–1 (3–4 p)	Tadcaster Albion (8)	400
3	Chorley (6)	2–1	Gateshead (6)	0
4	Southport (6)	2–1	Morpeth Town (7)	0
5	Stalybridge Celtic (7)	2–3	Longridge Town (9)	448
6	Whitley Bay (9)	2–4	Blyth Spartans (6)	150
7	Farsley Celtic (6)	2–1	Radcliffe (7)	0
8	Runcorn Linnets (8)	1–1 (3–4 p)	Marine (8)	331
9	Ashton United (7)	0–4	South Shields (7)	310
10	Curzon Ashton (6)	1–2	FC United of Manchester (7)	0
11	Darlington (6)	2–2 (5–4 p)	Prescot Cables (8)	0
12	Bradford (Park Avenue) (6)	1–3	Spennymoor Town (6)	0
13	Warrington Rylands 1906 (9)	0–1	York City (6)	300
14	Hyde United (7)	2–4	AFC Fylde (6)	404
15	Marske United (8)	6–0	Consett (9)	361
16	Skelmersdale United (9)	2–1	Lancaster City (7)	0
17	Boston United (6)	4–2	AFC Mansfield (9)	0
18	Hednesford Town (7)	0–0 (3–5 p)	Halesowen Town (8)	600
19	Coalville Town (7)	1–2	Alfreton Town (6)	437
20	Tamworth (7)	3–1	Evesham United (8)	496
21	Chasetown (8)	1–1 (4–5 p)	AFC Telford United (6)	369
22	Alvechurch (7)	2–2 (4–2 p)	Kidderminster Harriers (6)	445
23	Nantwich Town (7)	1–0	Barwell (7)	225
24	Mickleover (7)	4–1	Newark (9)	432
25	Buxton (7)	0–0 (2–4 p)	Stafford Rangers (7)	401
26	Grantham Town (7)	0–1	Matlock Town (7)	349
27	Leamington (6)	0–1	Banbury United (7)	0
28	Worksop Town (8)	2–2 (3–5 p)	Chester (6)	293
29	Nuneaton Borough (7)	2–1	Stratford Town (7)	488
30	Ilkeston Town (8)	4–1	Hanley Town (9)	
31	AFC Dunstable (8)	1–2	Hemel Hempstead Town (6)	214
32	Brackley Town (6)	2–2 (4–2 p)	Billericay Town (6)	0
33	Maldon & Tiptree (8)	2–2 (5–4 p)	Grays Athletic (8)	251
34	Canvey Island (8)	2–2 (4–3 p)	Biggleswade (8)	289
35	Cheshunt (7)	1–2	Cambridge City (8)	356
36	Royston Town (7)	2–2 (4–2 p)	Stamford (8)	422
37	Barking (8)	2–2 (3–2 p)	Kings Langley (7)	197
38	Hashtag United (9)	1–1 (6–7 p)	Braintree Town (6)	
39	St Albans City (6)	5–0	Hitchin Town (7)	0
40	Bishop's Stortford (7)	1–0	Brentwood Town (8)	314
42	Walthamstow (9)	0–2	Hornchurch (7)	300
43	Leighton Town (9)	1–2	Leiston (7)	

Tie	Home team (Tier)	Score	Away team (Tier)	Att.
44	Brantham Athletic (9)	0–3	Aveley (8)	
45	Kettering Town (6)	2–0	Chelmsford City (6)	0
46	Peterborough Sports (7)	4–2	Stansted (9)	
47	Bury Town (8)	4–1	Waltham Abbey (8)	400
49	Hayes & Yeading United (7)	5–0	Bognor Regis Town (7)	301
50	Dartford (6)	0–1	Slough Town (6)	0
51	Farnborough (7)	0–1	Tonbridge Angels (6)	382
52	Harrow Borough (7)	1–5	Cray Valley Paper Mills (8)	153
53	Chipstead (8)	1–0	East Grinstead Town (8)	
54	Chichester City (8)	2–1	Risborough Rangers (10)	343
55	Corinthian-Casuals (7)	2–2 (1–3 p)	Dulwich Hamlet (6)	
56	Haringey Borough (7)	2–0	Chertsey Town (8)	
57	Folkestone Invicta (7)	0–3	Chatham Town (9)	594
58	Hendon (7)	0–1	Maidstone United (6)	310
59	Hanwell Town (8)	3–5	Hartley Wintney (7)	280
60	Moneyfields (8)	2–6	Cray Wanderers (7)	
61	Ebbsfleet United (6)	2–2 (4–1 p)	Hastings United (8)	0
62	Sheppey United (9)	2–0	Welling United (6)	300
63	Corinthian (9)	0–1	Hampton & Richmond Borough (6)	221
64	Bedfont Sports (8)	2–0	Carshalton Athletic (7)	
65	Dorking Wanderers (6)	3–3 (3–4 p)	Eastbourne Borough (6)	0
66	Bracknell Town (8)	2–2 (4–3 p)	Marlow (8)	389
67	Metropolitan Police (7)	1–2	Walton Casuals (7)	287
69	Weston-super-Mare (7)	2–2 (4–2 p)	Swindon Supermarine (7)	319
70	Truro City (7)	4–0	Hungerford Town (6)	
71	Saltash United (10)	1–3	Sholing (8)	285
72	Frome Town (8)	1–1 (3–4 p)	Larkhall Athletic (8)	
73	Christchurch (9)	1–1 (6–5 p)	Gloucester City (6)	265
74	Tiverton Town (7)	3–5	Taunton Town (7)	560
75	Gosport Borough (7)	1–3	Hereford (6)	501
76	Bath City (6)	3–2	Winchester City (8)	0
77	Wimborne Town (7)	0–0 (5–4 p)	Melksham Town (8)	
78	Kidlington (8)	1–1 (6–7 p)	Bristol Manor Farm (8)	294
79	Royal Wootton Bassett Town (9)	1–2	Oxford City (6)	320
80	Chippenham Town (6)	2–2 (5–4 p)	Poole Town (7)	
Sunday 4 October 2020
41	Concord Rangers (6)	2–1	Potters Bar Town (7)	148
Match played at Potters Bar Town
48	Havant & Waterlooville (6)	2–1	Horsham (7)	0
Match played at Bognor Regis Town
Monday 5 October 2020
68	Burnham (9)	1–3	Whyteleafe (8)	248
Match played at Whyteleafe

== Third qualifying round ==
The draw for the third qualifying round was made on 5 October 2020, and consists solely of the 80 winners from the second qualifying round. Ties were played on Tuesday, 13 October and Wednesday, 14 October 2020. This round included five teams from Level 9, these being Longridge Town, Skelmersdale United, Chatham Town, Sheppey United, and Christchurch, the lowest-ranked teams left in the competition.

Tie	Home team (Tier)	Score	Away team (Tier)	Att.
Tuesday 13 October 2020
1	Southport (6)	1–1 (2–4 p)	South Shields (7)	0
2	Longridge Town (9)	0–1	Skelmersdale United (9)	
3	Chester (6)	3–1	Spennymoor Town (6)	0
5	Farsley Celtic (6)	1–3	AFC Fylde (6)	0
6	Darlington (6)	6–1	Tadcaster Albion (8)	0
7	Marine (8)	4–1	Nantwich Town (7)	397
8	Chorley (6)	1–0	York City (6)	0
9	Guiseley (6)	2–0	Matlock Town (7)	0
10	FC United of Manchester (7)	w/o (Note: FC United of Manchester were awarded a walkover due to an Alfreton player testing positive for COVID-19, forcing them to forfeit.)	Alfreton Town (6)	
11	St Albans City (6)	1–1 (4–3 p)	Mickleover (7)	
12	Braintree Town (6)	0–1	Maldon & Tiptree (8)	0
13	Ilkeston Town (8)	1–0	Alvechurch (7)	400
15	Stafford Rangers (7)	3–1	Hereford (6)	585
16	Peterborough Sports (7)	1–1 (6–7 p)	Banbury United (7)	478
17	Leiston (7)	0–0 (9–8 p)	AFC Telford United (6)	334
18	Brackley Town (6)	w/o (Note: Brackley Town were awarded a walkover due to a Kettering Town player testing positive for COVID-19, forcing them to forfeit.)	Kettering Town (6)	
19	Cambridge City (8)	2–0	Halesowen Town (8)	400
20	Oxford City (6)	6–1	Tamworth (7)	80
21	Bury Town (8)	2–0	Nuneaton Borough (7)	400
22	Boston United (6)	w/o (Note: Hemel Hempstead Town were awarded a walkover due to a Boston United player testing positive for COVID-19, forcing them to forfeit.)	Hemel Hempstead Town (6)	

Tie	Home team (Tier)	Score	Away team (Tier)	Att.
23	Haringey Borough (7)	5–1	Bracknell Town (8)	
25	Bedfont Sports (8)	0–2	Canvey Island (8)	237
26	Cray Valley Paper Mills (8)	2–0	Aveley (8)	
27	Hartley Wintney (7)	3–1	Barking (8)	
28	Bristol Manor Farm (8)	3–3 (2–4 p)	Cray Wanderers (7)	392
29	Eastbourne Borough (6)	3–1	Sheppey United (9)	0
30	Hayes & Yeading United (7)	0–0 (4–2 p)	Chipstead (8)	369
31	Slough Town (6)	0–1	Bath City (6)	0
32	Taunton Town (7)	4–2	Truro City (7)	584
33	Christchurch (9)	1–1 (1–3 p)	Dulwich Hamlet (6)	300
34	Wimborne Town (7)	2–2 (3–1 p)	Maidstone United (6)	
35	Sholing (8)	5–2	Walton Casuals (7)	341
36	Chichester City (8)	1–2	Tonbridge Angels (6)	400
37	Weston-super-Mare (7)	6–0	Larkhall Athletic (8)	
38	Hampton & Richmond Borough (6)	2–2 (4–3 p)	Hornchurch (7)	0
39	Whyteleafe (8)	1–2	Concord Rangers (6)	
40	Ebbsfleet United (6)	1–1 (8–9 p)	Chippenham Town (6)	0
Wednesday 14 October 2020
4	Marske United (8)	1–0	Blyth Spartans (6)	400
14	Bishop's Stortford (7)	3–0	Royston Town (7)	600
24	Havant & Waterlooville (6)	4–1	Chatham Town (9)	0

== Fourth qualifying round ==
The draw for the fourth qualifying round was made on 15 October 2020, and saw 23 clubs from Level 5 joining the 40 winners from the third qualifying round. Ties were played on the weekend of Saturday, 24 October 2020. This round included one team from Level 9, Skelmersdale United, the lowest-ranked team left in the competition. Due to the liquidation of Macclesfield Town, there was an odd number of teams competing in this round. As a result, Chorley were drawn to receive a bye to the First round proper.

Tie	Home team (Tier)	Score	Away team (Tier)	Att.
Saturday 24 October 2020
1	Darlington (6)	2–0	Cambridge City (8)	0
2	Stafford Rangers (7)	1–4	Skelmersdale United (9)	600
3	Solihull Moors (5)	4–0	Wrexham (5)	0
4	Banbury United (7)	2–1	Bury Town (8)	600
5	South Shields (7)	2–0	Halifax Town (5)	300
6	Ilkeston Town (8)	0–6	Hartlepool United (5)	400
7	FC United of Manchester (7)	2–1	Guiseley (6)	600
8	Brackley Town (6)	5–1	Marske United (8)	0
9	King's Lynn Town (5)	w/o (Note: King's Lynn Town were awarded a walkover due to several Notts County players testing positive for COVID-19, forcing them to forfeit.)	Notts County (5)	
10	Stockport County (5)	Void (Note: Chesterfield originally won 7-6 on penalties after a 1-1 draw, but the tie was declared null and void due to Chesterfield fielding an ineligible player, enforcing a rematch.)	Chesterfield (5)	0
12	Chester (6)	0–1	Marine (8)	0
13	Maidenhead United (5)	2–3	Cray Valley Paper Mills (8)	0
14	Canvey Island (8)	3–2	Cray Wanderers (7)	400
15	Wealdstone (5)	0–2	Hayes & Yeading United (7)	0
16	Sutton United (5)	0–1	Bromley (5)	0
17	Tonbridge Angels (6)	5–0	Taunton Town (7)	0
18	Hemel Hempstead Town (6)	0–1	Hampton & Richmond Borough (6)	0
19	Aldershot Town (5)	1–2	Woking (5)	0

Tie	Home team (Tier)	Score	Away team (Tier)	Att.
20	Maldon & Tiptree (8)	1–0	Haringey Borough (7)	382
21	Dagenham & Redbridge (5)	1–0	Hartley Wintney (7)	0
22	Leiston (7)	2–3	Barnet (5)	600
23	Weymouth (5)	2–3	Oxford City (6)	0
24	Eastbourne Borough (6)	1–0	Dulwich Hamlet (6)	0
25	Eastleigh (5)	3–1	Weston-super-Mare (7)	0
26	Sholing (8)	0–2	Torquay United (5)	400
27	Bath City (6)	0–3	Havant & Waterlooville (6)	0
28	Boreham Wood (5)	2–0	Wimborne Town (7)	0
29	Yeovil Town (5)	3–3 (7–6 p)	Dover Athletic (5)	0
31	Concord Rangers (6)	2–1	Chippenham Town (6)	0
	Chorley (6)	Bye		
Sunday 25 October 2020
11	AFC Fylde (6)	2–1	Altrincham (5)	0
Monday 26 October 2020
30	Bishop's Stortford (7)	2–0	St Albans City (6)	600
Wednesday 4 November 2020
10R	Stockport County (5)	4–0	Chesterfield (5)	0

== Broadcasting ==
The qualifying rounds were not covered by the FA Cup's broadcasting contracts held by BBC Sport and BT Sport, although one game per round was broadcast by the BBC on its media platforms. In addition, Hashtag United streamed their second qualifying-round match live on Twitch.

Round	Tie	Broadcaster
Extra preliminary round	Maine Road v Squires Gate	BBC Sport
Preliminary pound	Stocksbridge Park Steels v Stalybridge Celtic	BBC Sport
First qualifying round	Hashtag United v Soham Town Rangers	BBC Sport
Second qualifying round	Warrington Rylands 1906 v York City	BBC Sport
Second qualifying round	Hashtag United v Braintree Town	Twitch
Third qualifying round	Christchurch v Dulwich Hamlet	BBC Sport
Fourth qualifying round	Ilkeston Town v Hartlepool United	BBC Sport
Fourth qualifying round	Bishop's Stortford v St Albans City	BT Sport
