= 2017–18 Southern Combination Football League =

The 2017–18 Southern Combination Football League season was the 93rd in the history of the competition, which lies at levels 9 and 10 of the English football league system.

The constitution was announced on 26 May 2017.

== Premier Division ==
Southern Combination Premier Division
- Season: 2017–18
- Champions: Haywards Heath Town
- Promoted: Haywards Heath Town; Three Bridges
- Relegated: Worthing United; Littlehampton Town
- Matches: 380
- Goals: 1,261 (3.32 per match)

The Premier Division consisted of 20 clubs, the same as last season, after Wick and Hailsham Town were relegated to Division One, and Shoreham were promoted to Isthmian League Division One South.

Three clubs joined the division:

- East Preston – promoted from Division One
- Saltdean United – promoted from Division One
- Three Bridges – relegated from Isthmian League Division One South

With the suspension of ground grading Grade E for this season and the creation of a new league at Steps 3 and 4, the champions of all Step 5 leagues were compulsorily promoted to Step 4. Of the fourteen runners-up, the twelve clubs with the best PPG (points per game ratio) were also to be compulsorily promoted, but with resignations and mergers in leagues above, thirteen runners-up were promoted.

Teams at Step 5 without ground grading Grade F were to be relegated to Step 6, but no club in this division failed the ground grading process. All Step 5 leagues were fixed at 20 clubs for 2018–19.

=== League table ===
Pos	Team	Pld	W	D	L	GF	GA	GD	Pts	Promotion or relegation
1	Haywards Heath Town	38	26	5	7	88	34	+54	83	Promoted to Isthmian League South East Division
2	Three Bridges	38	24	10	4	91	38	+53	82	Promoted to Isthmian League South East Division
3	Pagham	38	22	9	7	100	42	+58	75	
4	Horsham YMCA	38	22	5	11	73	39	+34	71	
5	Eastbourne Town	38	19	12	7	81	40	+41	69	
6	Chichester City	38	20	8	10	86	54	+32	68	
7	Peacehaven & Telscombe	38	20	8	10	62	37	+25	68	
8	Saltdean United	38	19	8	11	58	43	+15	65	
9	Newhaven	38	18	7	13	77	58	+19	61	
10	Lancing	38	16	4	18	58	63	−5	52	
11	Loxwood	38	15	6	17	61	78	−17	51	
12	Crawley Down Gatwick	38	11	12	15	59	69	−10	45	
13	East Preston	38	12	9	17	59	72	−13	45	
14	AFC Uckfield Town	38	15	8	15	52	52	0	44 (Note: AFC Uckfield Town were deducted nine points for fielding an ineligible player.)	
15	Broadbridge Heath	38	10	7	21	51	81	−30	37	
16	Eastbourne United	38	8	8	22	45	94	−49	32	
17	Arundel	38	8	6	24	54	80	−26	30	
18	Hassocks	38	8	4	26	38	92	−54	28 (Note: Hassocks were reprieved from relegation.)	
19	Worthing United	38	8	3	27	29	100	−71	27	Relegated to Division One
20	Littlehampton Town	38	5	9	24	39	95	−56	24	Relegated to Division One

Source: http://www.scfl.org.uk/pages/tables.html
Rules for classification: 1) points; 2) goal difference; 3) number of goals scored.

=== Results table ===
Home \ Away	UCK	ARU	BBH	CCH	CDG	EPR	EBT	EBU	HSK	HHE	HYM	LAN	LIT	LOX	NEW	PAG	PAT	SDU	TBD	WRU
AFC Uckfield Town		2–1	4–0	1–1	2–0	1–2	3–3	0–1	1–4	0–2	1–1	2–1	3–1	0–0	1–0	3–4	0–4	2–1	0–2	2–0
Arundel	0–1		3–3	3–4	2–3	2–3	1–1	0–3	0–3	1–2	3–1	3–4	1–0	1–1	2–2	1–1	2–0	1–4	0–3	1–2
Broadbridge Heath	4–1	3–2		2–0	0–0	1–1	0–2	1–4	2–0	0–4	1–2	2–1	3–1	1–2	2–1	1–2	0–2	2–3	1–5	1–0
Chichester City	4–0	5–2	0–0		3–2	1–1	4–3	0–0	1–2	1–6	1–1	5–0	0–1	5–0	0–2	0–5	1–0	3–0	3–1	5–3
Crawley Down Gatwick	2–1	2–2	3–0	2–2		2–1	3–4	2–2	1–1	1–1	0–2	2–2	1–1	3–0	1–0	1–3	2–0	0–4	0–0	3–0
East Preston	2–1	0–2	3–0	2–4	2–0		1–2	5–1	1–0	0–2	1–4	1–1	1–1	2–2	2–4	1–1	1–0	0–4	2–1	1–1
Eastbourne Town	1–1	4–1	5–0	0–1	3–2	8–1		4–2	3–1	1–1	0–2	2–0	2–2	1–1	2–1	0–2	1–1	0–2	1–2	2–1
Eastbourne United Association	0–1	1–3	2–2	1–2	2–1	3–5	1–2		0–1	0–1	0–5	2–1	3–3	1–2	2–3	1–5	2–2	0–0	0–3	0–1
Hassocks	1–3	0–4	3–2	0–4	1–3	1–2	2–2	0–4		1–4	0–2	0–4	3–1	0–3	2–3	0–3	0–6	0–1	0–2	2–0
Haywards Heath Town	1–2	2–0	5–1	2–1	2–2	5–1	3–0	2–3	5–0		2–0	2–0	2–1	4–2	3–1	3–0	1–0	3–0	1–4	4–0
Horsham YMCA	1–0	1–0	4–0	0–2	1–2	1–2	3–1	1–0	6–0	1–0		3–1	2–0	1–2	1–2	2–0	0–0	0–1	1–2	3–1
Lancing	0–3	2–0	2–1	1–4	3–1	4–0	2–0	0–2	3–1	0–1	2–4		2–0	4–1	1–2	0–1	1–1	0–2	1–4	4–1
Littlehampton Town	1–1	0–2	1–4	0–3	4–1	1–1	2–1	0–5	0–2	0–6	1–4	1–2		2–3	1–1	1–6	0–5	0–0	1–3	0–1
Loxwood	0–3	3–2	1–1	2–4	1–1	3–0	2–3	1–3	2–1	1–2	2–1	1–2	7–0		1–6	1–4	0–1	5–2	1–0	1–0
Newhaven	1–0	3–0	1–1	3–2	4–0	5–2	1–0	0–0	2–2	3–1	0–1	1–3	1–5	6–1		2–5	1–2	1–2	1–1	4–0
Pagham	2–2	1–2	4–0	1–1	3–1	6–1	0–0	2–2	0–0	3–0	4–0	0–1	5–1	5–1	3–2		2–3	3–0	1–3	7–0
Peacehaven & Telscombe	1–2	4–1	1–0	1–0	3–1	0–1	2–1	1–1	3–2	1–0	1–1	2–1	2–1	3–1	1–3	0–0		1–3	1–1	2–1
Saltdean United	1–0	1–0	2–0	1–0	2–2	3–0	1–0	0–0	3–0	1–1	1–3	1–1	4–0	0–1	3–3	1–3	0–2		1–1	0–1
Three Bridges	2–1	3–2	4–2	2–2	4–0	2–1	7–2	1–1	4–1	0–1	3–3	4–0	1–1	2–0	1–0	2–2	1–0	4–1		5–1
Worthing United	0–2	2–1	0–7	1–7	1–5	1–3	0–4	0–4	2–1	1–1	0–4	0–1	1–3	1–3	0–1	2–1	1–3	0–2	1–1	

Source: SCFL Fixtures and Results
Legend: Blue = home team win; Yellow = draw; Red = away team win.

== Division One ==
Southern Combination Division One
- Season: 2017–18
- Champions: Little Common
- Promoted: Little Common; Langney Wanderers; Lingfield
- Matches: 306
- Goals: 1,293 (4.23 per match)

Division One featured 16 clubs which competed in the division last season, along with two new clubs, relegated from the Premier Division:

- Hailsham Town
- Wick

Step 6 clubs without ground grading Grade G were to be relegated to Step 7, but no club in this division failed the ground grading process. All Step 6 leagues were fixed at a maximum of 20 clubs for 2018–19.

=== League table ===
Pos	Team	Pld	W	D	L	GF	GA	GD	Pts	Promotion or relegation
1	Little Common	34	28	1	5	112	32	+80	85	Promoted to the Premier Division
2	Langney Wanderers	34	26	4	4	123	57	+66	82	Promoted to the Premier Division
3	Lingfield	34	25	4	5	114	46	+68	79	Promoted to the Premier Division
4	Ringmer	34	21	1	12	83	52	+31	64	Resigned at the end of the season
5	Wick	34	18	7	9	86	55	+31	61	
6	Mile Oak	34	17	5	12	82	68	+14	56	
7	Bexhill United	34	17	4	13	72	52	+20	55	
8	Hailsham Town	34	15	4	15	74	75	−1	49	
9	Selsey	34	13	8	13	54	52	+2	47	
10	St Francis Rangers	34	14	5	15	56	70	−14	47	
11	Steyning Town	34	13	4	17	74	71	+3	43	
12	Seaford Town	34	12	6	16	56	69	−13	42	
13	Midhurst & Easebourne	34	12	4	18	74	101	−27	40	
14	AFC Varndeanians	34	10	5	19	51	85	−34	35	
15	Storrington	34	7	6	21	39	96	−57	27	
16	Billingshurst	34	6	6	22	51	98	−47	24	
17	Oakwood	34	6	4	24	52	102	−50	22	
18	Southwick	34	4	6	24	40	112	−72	18	

Source: http://www.scfl.org.uk/pages/tables.html
Rules for classification: 1) points; 2) goal difference; 3) number of goals scored.

=== Results table ===
Home \ Away	VAR	BEX	BIL	HAI	LAW	LIN	LIT	MID	MIL	OAK	RIN	SEA	SEL	SOU	STF	STE	STO	WIC
AFC Vardeanians		1–4	4–1	2–2	1–3	4–2	1–4	3–7	2–1	1–1	0–3	5–0	1–2	5–1	1–2	2–1	2–2	0–4
Bexhill United	2–1		1–1	1–3	2–4	0–3	0–2	8–0	0–1	2–1	0–2	2–0	2–1	2–1	4–2	3–1	1–2	1–1
Billingshurst	1–3	1–0		1–3	1–5	2–1	1–3	3–4	3–4	3–2	1–2	2–2	1–1	1–3	0–1	2–1	1–1	2–2
Hailsham Town	3–1	1–1	3–2		3–3	0–6	1–3	3–2	5–1	4–2	0–2	3–0	0–2	6–2	1–2	2–0	2–1	2–7
Langney Wanderers	3–2	1–3	3–1	4–3		5–2	3–2	9–0	5–4	2–0	4–2	4–2	4–1	8–2	2–2	5–1	11–2	3–2
Lingfield	6–0	5–1	5–1	3–1	2–2		6–0	5–0	6–1	6–1	2–1	4–3	3–1	6–1	1–0	4–3	3–0	3–0
Little Common	5–0	2–0	8–0	3–0	2–1	1–2		2–0	3–1	6–1	2–3	4–1	4–1	3–2	8–1	1–0	3–0	2–0
Midhurst & Easebourne	2–3	2–4	5–1	4–2	4–5	2–2	0–5		2–2	2–1	5–4	3–1	2–2	1–2	0–2	1–3	2–1	3–2
Mile Oak	1–0	3–1	4–2	2–2	1–3	2–1	0–5	5–2		5–0	0–1	2–3	3–1	1–1	2–0	3–2	7–1	3–3
Oakwood	3–1	0–7	4–2	1–2	1–3	1–3	1–5	3–4	2–2		1–6	1–3	0–2	5–2	2–3	2–5	5–1	2–3
Ringmer	0–0	2–1	7–0	1–0	0–2	0–1	0–5	6–2	0–1	4–2		3–1	2–3	5–0	1–2	2–1	5–0	1–3
Seaford Town	5–1	1–3	3–2	2–0	3–3	1–2	0–1	0–1	3–1	2–2	0–3		1–1	2–2	4–0	2–1	2–1	2–2
Selsey	2–0	1–3	2–2	2–0	0–1	1–4	1–2	2–1	3–2	0–2	0–2	2–0		7–0	3–1	1–1	3–0	2–2
Southwick	0–1	0–2	1–3	4–7	0–5	2–2	2–2	0–4	0–4	0–2	2–1	1–2	1–0		2–5	2–2	1–1	1–4
St Francis Rangers	1–1	1–1	3–1	1–2	2–4	4–4	0–6	1–0	0–5	2–1	2–3	2–0	1–1	5–0		0–2	2–3	0–2
Steyning Town	5–0	4–2	1–2	2–6	2–1	2–4	0–5	5–4	1–4	5–0	6–1	4–1	1–2	2–0	2–0		2–2	2–2
Storrington	2–1	0–3	1–0	3–2	2–0	1–4	1–3	2–2	2–3	0–0	1–5	0–2	2–0	3–1	0–3	1–3		0–5
Wick	5–0	1–5	5–4	2–0	0–2	2–1	2–0	2–1	3–1	4–0	2–3	1–2	1–1	3–1	1–3	2–1	6–1	

Source: SCFL Fixtures and Results
Legend: Blue = home team win; Yellow = draw; Red = away team win.

== Division Two ==
Southern Combination Division Two
- Season: 2017–18
- Champions: Rustington
- Promoted: Alfold; Sidlesham
- Matches: 182
- Goals: 754 (4.14 per match)

Division Two featured 15 clubs which competed in the division last season, no new clubs joined this season.

Promotion from this division depended on ground grading as well as league position.

Also, Worthing Town Leisure reverted to the name of Worthing Town after their merger with Worthing Leisure F.C. was ended after one season.

=== League table ===
Pos	Team	Pld	W	D	L	GF	GA	GD	Pts	Promotion
1	Rustington	26	17	5	4	79	24	+55	56	
2	Sidlesham	26	16	5	5	63	21	+42	53	Promoted to Division One
3	Jarvis Brook	26	16	4	6	59	37	+22	52	
4	Alfold	26	14	5	7	67	39	+28	47	Promoted to Division One
5	Bosham	26	14	5	7	62	43	+19	47	
6	Roffey	26	13	7	6	65	41	+24	46	
7	Cowfold	26	12	7	7	60	39	+21	43	
8	Westfield	26	12	4	10	60	47	+13	40	
9	Montpelier Villa	26	10	4	12	47	53	−6	34	
10	Upper Beeding	26	9	4	13	36	44	−8	31	
11	Worthing Town	26	7	4	15	44	81	−37	25	
12	Rottingdean Village	26	7	2	17	36	89	−53	23	
13	Clymping	26	4	1	21	48	91	−43	13	
14	Ferring	26	1	3	22	28	105	−77	6	
15	Lancing United	0	0	0	0	0	0	0	0	Resigned, record expunged (Note: Lancing United resigned from the league in February 2018, and their playing record of P17 W5 D1 L11 GF27 GA55 Pts16 was expunged.)
