= Little Common F.C. =

Association football club in England

Coordinates: 50.8489°N 0.4394°E

Little Common
- Full name: Little Common Football Club
- Nickname: The Green Lane Boys
- Founded: 1966 (as Albion United)
- Ground: Little Common Recreation Ground, Bexhill-on-Sea
- Chairman: Daniel Eldridge
- Manager: Russell Eldridge
- League: Southern Combination Premier Division
- 2025–26: Southern Combination Premier Division, 16th of 20
- Website: littlecommonfc.co.uk
Home colours	Away colours

Little Common Football Club is a football club based in the Little Common area of Bexhill-on-Sea, East Sussex, England. They are currently members of the Southern Combination Premier Division and play at the Little Common Recreation Ground.

== History ==
The club was established by Ken Cherry in 1966 as a youth club under the name Albion United, initially fielding under-14 and under-16 teams. They later started an adult team, which entered the Hastings League. In 1970 the club joined Division Three of the East Sussex League, which they won at the first attempt, earning promotion to Division Two. They won Division Two the following season, resulting in promotion to Division One. A third successive league title in 1972–73 saw the club win Division One and earn promotion to the Premier Division.

In 1976–77 Albion United were Premier Division champions, remaining unbeaten through the entire league season. The club then moved up to Division Two of the Sussex County League. They finished bottom of Division Two in 1980–81 and 1981–82, but were not relegated. In 1986 the club were renamed Little Common Albion. After finishing bottom of Division Two in 1993–94, they were relegated to Division Three. The following season saw them finish second-from-bottom of Division Three, after which they dropped back into the East Sussex League. In 2002 the club dropped Albion from their name.

After winning the East Sussex League Premier Division in 2004–05, Little Common were promoted back to Division Three of the Sussex County League. They were Division Three runners-up in 2008–09, earning promotion to Division Two. In 2015 the league was renamed the Southern Combination, with Division Two becoming Division One. In 2016–17 the club were Division One runners-up, but were unable to take promotion as their ground did not meet the required criteria. However, after winning the division the following season, they were promoted to the Premier Division after moving to Eastbourne United's Oval ground.

== Ground ==
After playing at grounds with no facilities, in 1974 the club purchased two prefabricated buildings that had been built in Fulham after World War II for £500 and moved them to their Little Common Recreation Ground to create a clubhouse and changing rooms. A new pavilion was opened in November 2002.

In 2018 the club relocated to Eastbourne United's Oval ground in order to secure promotion. However, after fully enclosing the ground and installing two new stands, the club returned to the Recreation Ground in December 2021.

== Honours ==
- Southern Combination
  - Division One champions 2017–18
- East Sussex League
  - Premier Division champions 1976–77, 2004–05
  - Division One champions 1972–73
  - Division Two champions 1971–72
  - Division Three champions 1970–71

== Records ==
- Best FA Cup performance: First qualifying round, 2019–20, 2020–21
- Best FA Vase performance: Second qualifying round, 2016–17, 2018–19, 2021–22
