= Langney Wanderers F.C. =

Association football club in England

Langney Wanderers
- Full name: Langney Wanderers Football Club
- Founded: 2010
- Dissolved: 2021
- Ground: Shinewater Lane (2010–2016); The Oval (2016–2017); Priory Lane (2017–2021)
Home colours	Away colours

Langney Wanderers Football Club were a football club based in the Langney district of Eastbourne, East Sussex, England. They groundshared at Eastbourne Borough's Priory Lane.

== History ==
The club was established in 2010 and joined the Lewes Sunday League. In 2012 they applied for membership of the East Sussex League, gaining entry to the Premier Division for the 2012–13 season. The club were Premier Division champions at the first attempt, winning 17 of their 18 league matches, and were promoted to Division Three of the Sussex County League.

Langney were Division Three champions the following season, but were unable to be promoted to Division Two as their ground did not have floodlights. However, after finishing third in Division Three in 2014–15 the club were promoted after planning permission was secured for floodlights.

In 2015 the Sussex County League was renamed the Southern Combination, with Division Two becoming Division One. The 2016–17 season saw Langney win the Division One Cup, beating Southwick 3–0 in the final. In the following season the club achieved promotion to the Premier Division with five games to spare.

In March 2021 the club announced they would fold due to financial issues.

== Ground ==
The club initially played at Shinewater Lane, the former ground of Shinewater Association. Due to problems with the pitch, they played at Eastbourne United Association's Oval ground during the 2016–17 season, before moving to Eastbourne Borough's Priory Lane ground for the 2017–18 season.

== Management history ==
Name	From	To	Time in charge	Notes
(England) Dave Shearing	July 2013			
(Scotland) Kenny McCreadie		13 October 2016		
(England) Andy Goodchild	1 November 2016	9 October 2018	1 year, 342 days	
(Scotland) Kenny McCreadie	10 October 2018	20 August 2019	314 days	
(England) Simon Colbran	21 August 2019	23 July 2020	337 days	
(England) Alex Walsh	27 July 2020	25 October 2020	90 days	
(England) Simon Colbran	25 October 2020	31 March 2021	157 days	

== Honours ==
- Southern Combination
  - Division Three champions 2013–14
  - Division One Cup winners 2016–17
- East Sussex League
  - Premier Division champions 2012–13

== Records ==
- Best FA Cup performance: Preliminary round, 2020–21
- Best FA Vase performance: Second qualifying round, 2017–18, 2020–21
