= Chichester City F.C. =

Association football club in England

Coordinates: 50°50′33″N 0°46′31″W

Chichester City
- Full name: Chichester City Football Club
- Nickname: Lillywhites
- Founded: 2000
- Ground: Oaklands Park, Chichester
- Capacity: 2,000
- Chairman: Andrew Bell
- Manager: Miles Rutherford
- League: Southern League Premier Division South
- 2025–26: Isthmian League Premier Division, 12th of 22 (transferred)
- Website: https://chichestercityfc.co.uk/
Home colours	Away colours

Chichester City Football Club is a semi-professional football club based in Chichester, West Sussex, England. Affiliated to the Sussex County Football Association, they are currently members of the Southern League Premier Division South and play at Oaklands Park.

== History ==
The club was established in 2000 as a merger of Chichester City and Portfield, and was originally named Chichester City United. Both clubs were in Division One of the Sussex County League, with the new club taking their place in the division, with the new club losing their first league match 5–1 at home to Saltdean United. They were Division One champions in 2003–04. The following season saw them finish sixteenth, although they won the Brighton Charity Cup, beating Horsham on penalties in the final. They retained it in 2005–06, defeating Ringmer 2–1 in the final.

In 2006–07 Chichester won the Sussex RUR Cup with a 2–1 win over Whitehawk in the final. In 2009 the club was renamed Chichester City. The league was renamed the Southern Combination in 2015, with Division One becoming the Premier Division. In 2018–19 the club were Premier Division champions, earning promotion to the South East Division of the Isthmian League. In 2019–20 they reached the first round of the FA Cup for the first time, and were then given a bye to the second round due to Bury having been removed from the competition. In the second round they lost 5–1 to League One side Tranmere Rovers. In 2023–24 the club finished fifth in the Isthmian League South East Division, qualifying for the promotion play-offs. After beating Ramgate 1–0 in the semi-finals, they defeated Three Bridges 5–0 in the final to earn promotion to the Premier Division.

At the end of the 2025–26 season Chichester were transferred to the Premier Division South of the Southern League.

== Ground ==
The club originally played at Portfield's Church Road, with the agreement that Chichester District Council would sell the ground for housing and use the funds to redevelop Chichester City's Oaklands Park ground. They moved to Oaklands Park in 2008 after a 100-seat stand was installed; the final match at Church Road was a 5–4 win against Three Bridges on 19 April. A new clubhouse and changing rooms were completed in 2010, with hardstanding installed on all four sides of the pitch. An artificial pitch was installed in 2023–24.

== Colours ==
In 2024 the club changed its shirts to white, the historic colour of the original Chichester City, having played in green and white strips since the merged club's founding.

== Honours ==
- Southern Combination
  - Champions 2003–04, 2018–19
- Sussex RUR Cup
  - Winners 2006–07
- Brighton Charity Cup
  - Winners 2004–05, 2005–06

== Records ==
- Best FA Cup performance: Second round, 2019–20
- Best FA Trophy performance: Second round, 2024–25
- Best FA Vase performance: Fifth round, 2017–18

== See also ==
- Chichester City L.F.C.
