= A.F.C. Uckfield Town =

Association football club in England

Coordinates: 50°59′43.29″N 0°05′17.97″E

AFC Uckfield Town
- Full name: Association Football Club Uckfield Town
- Nicknames: The Oakmen, The Uckers
- Founded: 2014
- Ground: The Oaks, Uckfield
- Chairman: Rob Barden
- Manager: Tommy Haddon
- League: Mid-Sussex League Premier Division
- 2025–26: Southern Combination Division One, 17th of 18 (relegated)
- Website: afcuckfieldtown.com
Home colours	Away colours

A.F.C. Uckfield Town is a community football club based in Uckfield, East Sussex, England. They are currently members of the Mid-Sussex League Premier Division and play at The Oaks.

== History ==
The club was formed in July 2014 by a merger of Uckfield Town and AFC Uckfield; it adopted Uckfield Town's black and red colours for their home kit and AFC Uckfield's sky blue and navy blue as the away kit. At the time of the merger Uckfield Town were in Division Three of the Sussex County League, while AFC Uckfield were in Division Two; the new club took AFC Uckfield's place in Division Two and continued to play at their Oaks ground.

In their first season the club were Division Two runners-up, earning promotion to the Premier Division of the renamed Southern Combination League. They finished bottom of the Premier Division in 2023–24 and were relegated back to Division One.

== Ground ==
The club play their home games at the Oaks on Eastbourne Road. The club's reserve team plays at the Victoria Pleasure Ground.

== Other teams ==
The club's U23 and U18 team play in the Southern Combination and the women's team in the Sussex Women and Girls League. The women's team won the league in 2022–23.

== Non-playing staff ==
- First Team Manager: Tommy Haddon
- First Team Assistant Manager:
- First Team Coaches: Luke Carter, Nick Bignell, Rob Barden
- U23s Manager: Luke Carter
- U18s Manager: James Charlton
- Ladies Manager: Jon Wood
- Chairman: Rob Barden
- Treasurer: Natasha Leppard
- Secretary: Malcolm Jones
- Welfare Officer(s): Nick Bignell

== Records ==
- Best FA Cup performance: Second qualifying round, 2018–19
- Best FA Vase performance: Fourth round, 2018–19
