= 2025–26 FA Vase =

Football Association Vase
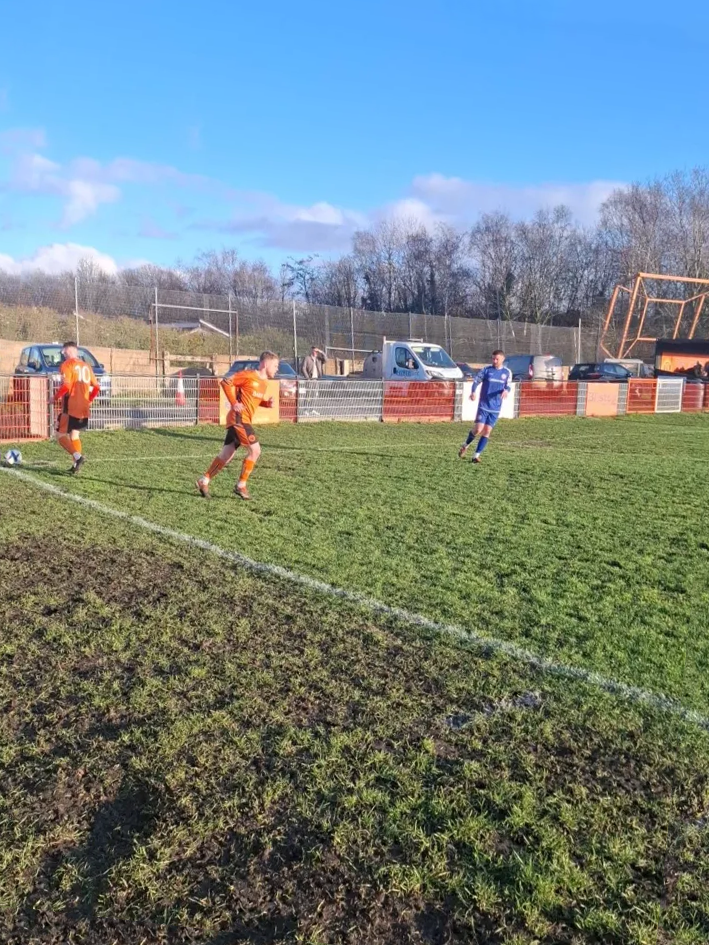
- Bilston Town 1–0 Gresley Rovers, Fourth round, 17 January 2026

Tournament details
- Country: England; Wales; Guernsey
- Dates: Qualifying: 23 August 2025 – 20 September 2025; Competition Proper: 18 October 2025 – 17 May 2026
- Teams: Total: 623

Final positions
- Champions: Stoneham (1st title)
- Runners-up: Cockfosters

The 2025–26 FA Vase (known for sponsorship reasons as the Isuzu FA Vase) was the 52nd season of the FA Vase, an annual football competition for teams playing in steps 5 & 6 of the English National League System. The competition was played on a regional basis until the fourth round.

== Calendar ==
Round	Main date	Number of fixtures	Clubs remaining	New entries this round	Prize money winners	Prize money losers
First Qualifying Round	23 August 2025	203	623 → 420	406	£550	£160
Second Qualifying Round	20 September 2025	187	420 → 233	171	£725	£225
First round proper	18 October 2025	105	233 → 128	23	£825	£250
Second round proper	8 November 2025	64	128 → 64	23	£900	£275
Third round proper	6 December 2025	32	64 → 32	None	£1,125	£350
Fourth round proper	17 January 2026	16	32 → 16	None	£1,875	£600
Fifth round proper	7 February 2026	8	16 → 8	None	£2,250	£725
Quarter-finals	28 February 2026	4	8 → 4	None	£4,125	1,350
Semi-finals	28 March 2026 & 4 April 2026	2	4 → 2	None	£5,500	£1,725
Final	17 May 2026	1	2 → 1	None	£30,000	£15,000

== First qualifying round ==
The draw for the first qualifying round was made on 4 July 2025.

Number of teams per tier still in competition
Tier 9	Tier 10	Total
319 / 319	304 / 304	623 / 623

Tie	Home team	Score	Away team	Att.
Friday 22 August 2025
138	Shirehampton (10)	0–2	Thornbury Town (9)	130
Match played at Thornbury Town
14	Pickering Town (9)	2–0	Horden Community Welfare (9)	202
33	South Leeds (10)	2–2 (2–4 p)	Barnton (10)	255
Match played at Barnton
42	Wythenshawe (9)	3–3 (4–3 p)	Cheadle Heath Nomads (10)	354
47	Romulus (9)	3–4	Lye Town (9)	111
92	Hoddesdon Town (10)	2–0	Burnham Ramblers (10)	88
96	Lymore Gardens (10)	1–0	Woodford Town (9)	101
107	Haverhill Borough (10)	1–5	AFC Welwyn (9)	61
117	London Samurai Rovers (10)	4–1	FC Deportivo Galicia (10)	67
163	Copthorne (10)	1–2	Godalming Town (10)	67
179	United Services Portsmouth (10)	1–4	Laverstock & Ford (9)	73
Match played at Fareham Town
103	Barkingside (10)	1–2	Hadleigh United (9)	68
Match played at Horsham
Saturday 23 August 2025
6	Padiham (9)	2–2 (5–4 p)	Sunderland RCA (10)	282
1	Darlington Town (10)	0–4	Whitley Bay (9)	120
2	Ilkley Town (10)	1–6	Newcastle Benfield (9)	86
3	Eccleshill United (9)	1–0	Guisborough Town (9)	60
4	Thornton Cleveleys (10)	2–1	Chester-le-Street Town (10)	188
5	Barnoldswick Town (9)	3–2	Birtley Town (9)	113
8	Park View (10)	2–0	Steeton (10)	66
9	Holker Old Boys (10)	2–0	Ryton & Crawcrook Albion (10)	112
10	Nelson (10)	4–1	Alnwick Town (10)	96
11	West Auckland Town (9)	2–3	Redcar Town (10)	169
12	Boro Rangers (9)	3–1	Newcastle Blue Star (9)	170
13	Esh Winning (10)	1–4	Easington Colliery (9)	79
15	Shildon (9)	8–1	Durham United (10)	102
Match played at Durham United
16	Seaham Red Star (10)	0–1	Colne (10)	187
17	Grangetown Boys Club (10)	1–0	Leeds UFCA (10)	91
18	Marske United (9)	0–0 (3–4 p)	Knaresborough Town (9)	206
19	Yarm & Eaglescliffe (10)	2–0	Newcastle University (10)	89
20	Farsley Celtic (9)	W/O	Boldon Community Association (10)	NA
Boldon Community Association awarded a walkover due to Farsley Celtic withdrawing from the competition.
21	Squires Gate (10)	1–2	Tadcaster Albion (9)	78
22	Fulwood Amateurs (10)	1–1 (3–2 p)	AFC Blackpool (10)	87
23	Garstang (10)	2–0	Prudhoe Youth Club (10)	80
24	Euxton Villa (9)	2–1	Worsbrough Bridge Athletic (10)	76
25	Maltby Main (10)	2–1	Stockport Georgians (10)	110
26	Handsworth (9)	2–5	Nostell Miners Welfare (10)	85
27	Charnock Richard (9)	2–0	Ashton Athletic (10)	145
28	Swallownest (10)	1–1 (3–4 p)	City of Liverpool (9)	81
29	Brigg Town (10)	3–2	Pilkington (9)	405
30	Retford United (10)	4–3	Beverley Town (9)	182
31	1874 Northwich (9)	0–2	Prestwich Heys (9)	255
32	Crowle Colts (10)	2–0	Maine Road (10)	87
34	Glossop North End (9)	1–1 (1–4 p)	Bacup Borough (10)	236
35	Liversedge (9)	1–0	Cammell Laird 1907 (10)	142
36	Frickley Athletic (9)	1–5	Maghull (10)	152
37	Club Thorne Colliery (10)	1–4	Horbury Town (10)	165
38	Northwich Victoria (9)	2–0	Winterton Rangers (10)	111
Match played at Sandbach United
39	Abbey Hey (9)	1–1 (3–4 p)	Doncaster City (10)	123
40	Burscough (9)	4–2	MSB Woolton (10)	113
41	FC St Helens (9)	1–1 (3–4 p)	Penistone Church (9)	110
43	Litherland REMYCA (9)	2–2 (4–5 p)	Rossington Main (9)	70
44	Retford (10)	1–0 (AET)	Appleby Frodingham (10)	179
45	Golcar United (9)	1–1 (2–4 p)	Goole (10)	224
46	Stockport Town (9)	3–0	Selby Town (10)	105
48	Ludlow Town (10)	1–1 (2–3 p)	Bewdley Town (10)	68
49	Wolverhampton Sporting (10)	1–0	Westfields (9)	27
50	Shawbury United (10)	5–1	Wellington (Herefords) (10)	51
51	Highgate United (9)	0–8	Nuneaton Town (9)	221
52	Market Drayton Town (10)	1–3	Haughmond (10)	161
53	Wolverhampton Casuals (10)	0–2	Dudley Town (9)	95
54	Brocton (9)	3–2	Studley (9)	146
55	Pershore Town (9)	1–1 (7–6 p)	Hinckley (9)	132
56	Stafford Town (10)	1–0	Tividale (9)	129
57	Hanley Town (9)	4–0	Wednesfield (10)	80
58	Gresley Rovers (9)	5–3	Telford Town (10)	332
59	Alsager Town (10)	2–1	Redditch Borough (10)	73
60	AFC Wolverhampton City (9)	2–2 (4–5 p)	AFC Bridgnorth (10)	127
61	Knowle (10)	4–1	Coventry Copsewood (10)	117
62	Cradley Town (10)	1–4	FC Stratford (10)	49
63	Smethwick Rangers (10)	3–3 (3–5 p)	Chelmsley Town (10)	75
64	Worcester Raiders (9)	0–2	Coton Green (9)	202
65	Deeping Rangers (9)	3–0	Allexton & New Parks (10)	106
66	South Normanton Athletic (10)	3–0	Blackstones (9)	66
67	Lutterworth Athletic (10)	0–3	Sandiacre Town (10)	66
68	AFC Mansfield (9)	0–2	Dunkirk (10)	109
69	Pinxton (10)	2–0	Holwell Sports (10)	74
70	Belper United (9)	3–0	Saffron Dynamo (10)	50
71	Leicester St Andrews (10)	5–1	Gedling Miners Welfare (10)	138
72	Holbeach United (10)	4–1	Kirby Muxloe (10)	84
73	Newark & Sherwood United (9)	1–1 (4–2 p)	Ingles (10)	54
74	Hucknall Town (9)	2–1	Boston Town (9)	179
75	Kimberley Miners Welfare (9)	1–0	Birstall United (10)	68
76	Clipstone (10)	4–0	Sleaford Town (10)	60
77	Southwell City (10)	4–2	Leicester Nirvana (9)	84
78	Fakenham Town (9)	4–2	Stowmarket Town (9)	108
79	Mulbarton Wanderers (9)	2–1	FC Peterborough (10)	83
80	Soham Town Rangers (9)	1–3	Ipswich Wanderers (9)	133
81	Lakenheath (9)	3–1	Dussindale & Hellesdon Rovers (10)	51
82	Diss Town (10)	0–2	Kirkley & Pakefield (9)	131
83	Framlingham Town (10)	1–1 (3–2 p)	Yaxley (9)	90
84	Godmanchester Rovers (9)	1–3	Halesworth Town (10)	50
85	Wisbech Town (9)	3–1	Woodbridge Town (9)	176
86	Heacham (9)	0–2	Ely City (9)	156
87	Histon (9)	3–3 (1–4 p)	Eaton Socon (10)	171
88	Haverhill Rovers (9)	5–2	Langford (10)	90
89	Southend Manor (10)	0–2	Cannons Wood (10)	64
90	Great Wakering Rovers (9)	6–2	Wivenhoe Town (10)	99
91	Cornard United (9)	1–2	May & Baker (10)	42
93	Barking (9)	0–0 (6–7 p)	Benfleet (9)	68
94	Holland (10)	1–2	Hutton (10)	35
97	Enfield Borough (10)	1–4	Clapton Community (10)	332

Tie	Home team	Score	Away team	Att.
Match played at Clapton Community
98	Harwich & Parkeston (9)	2–4	Brimsdown (10)	170
99	Stanway Pegasus (10)	0–2	Haringey Borough (9)	89
100	Shefford Town & Campton (9)	2–1	FC Romania (10)	82
101	Baldock Town (9)	0–5	Kings Park Rangers (10)	75
102	Wormley Rovers (9)	1–7	Hackney Wick (9)	118
105	Hullbridge Sports (9)	5–0	Stansted (10)	65
106	Ilford (9)	3–0	Romford (9)	105
108	Basildon United (9)	0–1	Buckhurst Hill (9)	54
109	Belstone (10)	2–0	FC Clacton (10)	84
110	Holyport (9)	0–2	Everett Rovers (10)	75
111	Chalfont St Peter (10)	1–2	Ashford Town (Middlesex) (9)	83
112	Penn & Tylers Green (10)	0–1	Kings Langley (9)	117
113	Kidlington (9)	0–0 (5–3 p)	Oxhey Jets (10)	82
114	Winslow United (9)	6–0	New Bradwell St Peter (10)	155
115	Buckingham (10)	1–2	Ampthill Town (10)	75
116	Risborough Rangers (9)	2–2 (3–5 p)	Moulton (9)	76
118	Rothwell Corinthians (10)	1–1 (1–4 p)	Langley (10)	36
119	Wembley (10)	4–0	Sport London e Benfica (10)	52
120	Amersham Town (9)	0–1	Brook House (10)	105
121	Aylesbury Vale Dynamos (9)	0–0 (4–2 p)	Rising Ballers Kensington (10)	91
122	Edgware & Kingsbury (9)	0–1	Staines & Lammas (Middlesex) (10)	49
123	Harefield United (9)	1–2	Rushden & Higham United (10)	40
124	Abingdon United (9)	2–1	North Greenford United (9)	164
125	Ardley United (9)	3–1	Wallingford & Crowmarsh (9)	84
126	Bedfont (10)	1–1 (4–3 p)	North Leigh (9)	51
127	PFC Victoria London (10)	2–2 (4–5 p)	Wellingborough Whitworth (10)	74
128	Northampton Sileby Rangers (9)	4–0	Spartans Youth (10)	65
130	Devizes Town (10)	2–1	Yateley United (10)	101
131	Thatcham Town (9)	2–0	Odd Down (10)	132
132	Chipping Sodbury Town (10)	1–1 (5–6 p)	Shortwood United (10)	68
133	Avonmouth (10)	3–0	Brimscombe & Thrupp (10)	117
134	Oldland Abbotonians (9)	0–5	Cirencester Town (9)	65
135	Cribbs (9)	0–2	Clanfield 85 (10)	66
136	Tuffley Rovers (9)	0–2	Longlevens (9)	206
137	Fairford Town (9)	3–1	Almondsbury (10)	94
139	Calne Town (10)	2–0	Nailsea & Tickenham (9)	59
140	Hengrove Athletic (10)	1–2	Mangotsfield United (9)	82
141	Wantage Town (10)	3–2	Cheltenham Saracens (10)	59
Match played at Cheltenham Saracens
143	Corsham Town (9)	4–0	Kintbury Rangers (10)	80
144	Newent Town (10)	4–2	Bradford Town (9)	132
145	Bitton (10)	0–3	Wokingham Town (9)	64
146	Woodley United (10)	0–1	Hallen (9)	37
Match played at Wallingford & Crowmarsh
147	Cinderford Town (9)	3–3 (5–4 p)	Royal Wootton Bassett Town (9)	173
148	Cadbury Heath (10)	1–4	Mendip Broadwalk (10)	58
149	Mile Oak (10)	0–0 (4–5 p)	Lewisham Borough (10)	52
150	Oakwood (10)	0–2	Punjab United (9)	62
151	Soul Tower Hamlets (9)	4–0	Sheppey Sports (10)	38
152	Cobham (9)	1–3	Abbey Rangers (9)	103
153	Arundel (10)	1–3	Steyning Town (9)	84
154	Forest Row (9)	1–6	Westside (10)	43
157	Ringmer (10)	0–4	Tooting & Mitcham United (9)	168
158	Loxwood (10)	1–7	Eastbourne United (9)	42
159	Worthing United (10)	0–2	Tooting Bec (10)	47
160	Redhill (9)	0–1	Fisher (9)	150
161	Chislehurst Glebe (9)	1–3	Faversham Strike Force (9)	74
162	Knaphill (9)	1–2	Shoreham (9)	116
164	Corinthian (9)	2–0	Horley Town (9)	81
165	Larkfield & New Hythe Wanderers (9)	0–2	Peacehaven & Telscombe (9)	95
166	Sheerwater (9)	6–1	Banstead Athletic (10)	57
167	East Preston (10)	0–7	Haywards Heath Town (9)	62
168	Hollands & Blair (9)	3–0	Lordswood (10)	107
169	Lingfield (9)	1–2	Seaford Town (9)	46
Match played at Steyning Town Community
170	Rochester United (10)	1–1 (6–5 p)	Colliers Wood United (10)	81
171	Bexhill United (9)	1–4	Guernsey (9)	137
172	Saltdean United (10)	1–5	FC Elmstead (10)	101
173	Phoenix Sports (9)	3–0	Lancing (9)	90
174	Wick (9)	1–0	Welling Town (10)	135
175	Bridport (10)	0–5	Millbrook (Hampshire) (9)	210
176	Petersfield Town (9)	1–2	Hamworthy Recreation (9)	124
177	Sturminster Newton United (10)	1–1 (5–4 p)	Ash United (10)	147
178	Hamble Club (9)	1–1 (4–2 p)	Fleetlands (10)	71
180	Amesbury Town (10)	3–0	Blackfield & Langley (10)	47
181	Hythe & Dibden (9)	1–0	Badshot Lea (9)	68
182	Pagham (9)	2–2 (4–5 p)	Newport (IOW) (10)	180
183	Alresford Town (10)	2–3	Whitchurch United (10)	120
184	East Cowes Victoria Athletic (9)	3–3 (5–3 p)	Brockenhurst (9)	147
185	Totton & Eling (10)	1–0	Romsey Town (10)	128
Match played at Romsey Town
186	Selsey (10)	2–0	Ringwood Town (10)	104
187	Cowes Sports (9)	5–5 (4–2 p)	Wincanton Town (9)	110
188	Cove (10)	3–0	Clanfield (10)	90
189	Folland Sports (10)	2–1	Bemerton Heath Harlequins (9)	76
190	Saltash United (9)	Void (Note: The score was 7–1 to Saltash United FC, however the FA have ordered tie to be replayed due to Saltash fielding a substitute not listed on the teamsheet. The tie is to be replayed at Bishops Lydeard with Saltash responsible for their own travel expenses.)	Bishops Lydeard (10)	92
191	Welton Rovers (10)	1–1 (6–5 p)	Torridgeside (10)	55
192	Crediton United (10)	5–3	Bude Town (10)	53
193	Elburton Villa (10)	0–1	Buckland Athletic (9)	86
194	St Day (10)	0–5	Stoke Gabriel & Torbay Police (10)	65
Match played at Wendron United
195	AFC St Austell (9)	1–3	Bovey Tracey (10)	109
196	Barnstaple Town (9)	2–1	Wadebridge Town (10)	185
197	Street (9)	1–0	Sticker (10)	116
198	Torrington (10)	0–1	Teignmouth (10)	65
199	Newquay (9)	3–2	Wendron United (10)	364
200	Dobwalls (10)	1–5	Helston Athletic (9)	67
201	Torpoint Athletic (9)	1–1 (5–4 p)	Middlezoy Rovers (10)	102
202	Ilminster Town (10)	2–2 (5–3 p)	Callington Town (10)	183
203	Camelford (10)	1–2	Radstock Town (10)	56
129	Virginia Water (9)	2–0	Dunstable Town (9)	120
Sunday 24 August 2025
155	Stansfeld (9)	1–2	Rusthall (9)	128
142	AFC Aldermaston (10)	0–0 (3–2 p)	Bristol Telephones (10)	80
7	Campion (9)	3–1	Penrith (9)	115
95	Rayleigh Town (10)	2–3	Potton United (9)	119
104	Basildon Town (10)	1–2	NW London (10)	52
156	AFC Walcountians (10)	1–2	Newhaven (9)	102
Tuesday 9 September 2025
190	Saltash United (9)	0–0 (4–5 p)	Bishops Lydeard (10)	32
Match played at Bishops Lydeard

== Second qualifying round ==
The draw for the second qualifying round was made on 4 July 2025 alongside the first qualifying round.

Number of teams per tier still in competition
Tier 9	Tier 10	Total
241 / 319	179 / 304	420 / 623

Tie	Home team	Score	Away team	Att.
Friday 19 September 2025
5	Easington Colliery (9)	2–2 (3–4 p)	Billingham Town (10)	151
115	Thornbury Town (9)	3–1	Brislington (9)	262
71	South Normanton Athletic (10)	1–6	Sherwood Colliery (9)	263
89	Lymore Gardens (10)	2–1	Frenford (9)	92
90	Cannons Wood (10)	1–5	Great Wakering Rovers (9)	97
91	AFC Welwyn (9)	3–1	Kings Park Rangers (10)	102
99	Langley (10)	0–0 (3–4 p)	Desborough Town (10)	105
145	Tooting & Mitcham United (9)	2–1	Guildford City (9)	247
Saturday 20 September 2025
136	Guernsey (9)	2–0	Croydon (10)	
168	Sturminster Newton United (10)	2–0	Newport (IOW) (10)	123
1	Thornaby (9)	0–1	Jarrow (10)	67
2	Billingham Synthonia (10)	4–2	Tow Law Town (9)	50
3	Shildon (9)	3–0	Longridge Town (9)	158
4	Whickham (9)	1–5	Redcar Town (10)	124
7	Newcastle Benfield (9)	3–0	Boldon Community Association (10)	116
8	Pickering Town (9)	0–1	Yarm & Eaglescliffe (10)	173
9	Whitley Bay (9)	3–0	Knaresborough Town (9)	368
10	Eccleshill United (9)	1–1 (2–0 p)	Park View (10)	61
11	FC Hartlepool (10)	1–2	West Allotment Celtic (9)	118
12	Harrogate Railway Athletic (10)	1–1 (3–2 p)	Thackley (9)	147
13	Barnoldswick Town (9)	10–1	Sunderland West End (10)	90
14	Boro Rangers (9)	1–2	Nelson (10)	76
15	Grangetown Boys Club (10)	1–4	Tadcaster Albion (9)	78
16	Holker Old Boys (10)	P–P	Route One Rovers (10)	NA
17	Thornton Cleveleys (10)	A–A	Colne (10)	212
18	Fulwood Amateurs (10)	5–1	Kendal Town (9)	152
19	Northallerton Town (9)	2–0	Garstang (10)	87
20	Ramsbottom United (9)	8–0	Glasshoughton Welfare (10)	203
21	Rossington Main (9)	4–0	Dronfield Town (10)	64
22	AFC Liverpool (9)	P–P	Daisy Hill (10)	NA
23	Armthorpe Welfare (10)	2–6	Darwen (10)	104
24	New Mills (10)	0–5	Wythenshawe (9)	137
25	Barton Town (9)	5–4	Retford (10)	95
26	Maghull (10)	0–2	Northwich Victoria (9)	186
27	Cheadle Town (9)	5–0	Barnton (10)	80
28	Goole (10)	4–4 (4–5 p)	Horbury Town (10)	133
29	Retford United (10)	4–1	Bottesford Town (9)	192
30	Euxton Villa (9)	3–3 (5–3 p)	Sandbach United (10)	86
31	Chadderton (9)	4–3	Wakefield (10)	154
32	Sheffield (9)	2–2 (3–4 p)	Burscough (9)	187
33	Liversedge (9)	0–4	Parkgate (9)	130
34	Athersley Recreation (10)	0–2	Brigg Town (10)	79
35	Nostell Miners Welfare (10)	0–4	Droylsden (10)	105
36	City of Liverpool (9)	0–1	Charnock Richard (9)	102
37	Ashville (10)	1–2	Penistone Church (9)	76
38	Doncaster City (10)	1–4	Prestwich Heys (9)	96
Match played at Prestwich Heys.
39	Staveley Miners Welfare (10)	2–3	Maltby Main (10)	161
40	Stockport Town (9)	0–2	Runcorn Town (10)	74
41	Irlam (9)	1–0	Bacup Borough (10)	81
42	Crowle Colts (10)	3–2	Dearne & District (10)	85
43	Heather St John's (10)	6–2	Foley Meir (10)	81
44	Bewdley Town (10)	1–3	Atherstone Town (9)	90
45	Lye Town (9)	1–0	Allscott Heath (10)	70
46	Stafford Town (10)	4–3	AFC Bridgnorth (10)	109
47	Pershore Town (9)	2–2 (5–6 p)	Chelmsley Town (10)	89
48	Eccleshall (10)	3–4	Stone Old Alleynians (9)	64
49	Gresley Rovers (9)	4–1	Uttoxeter Town (9)	321
50	FC Stratford (10)	4–2	Stapenhill (10)	25
Match played at Highgate United.
51	Dudley Town (9)	5–1	Stourport Swifts (9)	103
52	Hanley Town (9)	8–2	Birmingham OJM (10)	70
53	Brocton (9)	6–0	Shawbury United (10)	103
54	Coton Green (9)	3–0	Wolverhampton Sporting Community (10)	35
55	Alsager Town (10)	3–6	Coventry United (9)	69
56	Gornal Athletic (10)	7–1	Haughmond (10)	61
57	Knowle (10)	1–2	Nuneaton Town (9)	388
58	Ashby Ivanhoe (9)	6–1	Nuneaton Griff (10)	117
59	Bilston Town (10)	6–1	Hereford Pegasus (9)	118
60	Leicester St Andrews (10)	0–2	Eastwood (9)	146
61	Southwell City (10)	3–5	Radford (10)	92
62	Lutterworth Town (9)	3–2	Hucknall Town (9)	90
63	Stapleford Town (10)	0–3	Coalville Town (10)	128
64	Dunkirk (10)	2–3	Harrowby United (9)	40
65	Pinxton (10)	0–1	Kimberley Miners Welfare (9)	87
66	Skegness Town (9)	1–2	GNG Oadby Town (9)	62
67	Clipstone (10)	0–3	Belper United (9)	57
68	Sandiacre Town (10)	6–0	Holbeach United (10)	40
69	Deeping Rangers (9)	2–3	Aylestone Park (9)	132
70	Shirebrook Town (10)	1–2	Grantham Town (9)	184
72	Newark & Sherwood United (9)	1–0	Louth Town (10)	54
73	Clifton All Whites (10)	2–0	Pinchbeck United (10)	54
74	Eynesbury Rovers (9)	1–0	Kirkley & Pakefield (9)	115
75	Ely City (9)	0–0 (7–6 p)	Fakenham Town (9)	153
76	Mulbarton Wanderers (9)	1–3	Eaton Socon (10)	90
77	Framlingham Town (10)	2–1	Lakenheath (9)	72
78	Whittlesey Athletic (10)	5–0	Huntingdon Town (10)	88
79	Halesworth Town (10)	3–1	Ipswich Wanderers (9)	194
80	Harleston Town (9)	1–2	Wisbech Town (9)	107
81	Little Oakley (9)	2–0	Colney Heath (9)	57
82	Benfleet (9)	5–2	West Essex (9)	207
83	Saffron Walden Town (9)	3–0	Hackney Wick (9)	227
84	Potton United (9)	1–2	Hutton (10)	88
85	Halstead Town (9)	2–1	Coggeshall Town (10)	327
86	NW London (10)	2–2 (2–4 p)	Letchworth Garden City Eagles (10)	43
87	Brimsdown (10)	0–0 (5–4 p)	Clapton Community (10)	70
88	Ilford (9)	3–2	May & Baker Eastbrook Community (10)	77
92	Harlow Town (9)	2–2 (0–3 p)	Hullbridge Sports (9)	295
93	Biggleswade United (9)	4–1	Hadleigh United (9)	104
94	Haverhill Rovers (9)	3–2	Arlesey Town (9)	96
95	Hoddesdon Town (10)	0–2	Buckhurst Hill (9)	152

Tie	Home team	Score	Away team	Att.
96	Sawbridgeworth Town (9)	0–0 (5–6 p)	Haringey Borough (9)	76
97	Long Melford (10)	0–4	Cockfosters (9)	37
98	Shefford Town & Campton (9)	0–1	Belstone (10)	78
100	Everett Rovers (10)	2–2 (1-3 p)	Staines & Lammas (Middlesex) (10)	153
101	Easington Sports (9)	6–1	Holmer Green (10)	69
102	Broadfields United (9)	2–2 (5–6 p)	Wembley (10)	63
103	Bedfont (10)	4–0	Cranfield United (10)	51
104	Ardley United (9)	3–2	Wellingborough Whitworth (10)	102
105	Ashford Town (Middlesex) (9)	1–3	Kidlington (9)	108
106	Brook House (10)	1–4	Winslow United (9)	83
107	Abingdon United (9)	2–3	Irchester United (10)	167
108	Newport Pagnell Town (9)	2–1	Kings Langley (9)	280
109	Moulton (9)	2–0	British Airways (9)	86
110	Aylesbury Vale Dynamos (9)	1–3	London Samurai Rovers (10)	68
111	Rushden & Higham United (10)	2–2 (3–2 p)	Ampthill Town (10)	71
112	Hilltop (9)	2–2 (4–5 p)	Bugbrooke St. Michaels (9)	30
113	Northampton Sileby Rangers (9)	2–2 (6–5 p)	Crawley Green (9)	45
116	Devizes Town (10)	1–2	AFC Aldermaston (10)	75
Match played at Westbury United.
117	Malmesbury Victoria (10)	3–0	A.E.K. Boco (10)	75
118	Stonehouse Town (10)	1–3	Calne Town (10)	83
119	Hallen (9)	8–1	Milton United (9)	41
120	Wokingham Town (9)	1–1 (4–5 p)	Cinderford Town (9)	101
121	Thatcham Town (9)	2–1	Avonmouth (10)	159
122	Mangotsfield United (9)	1–4	Cirencester Town (9)	209
123	Newent Town (10)	2–0	Keynsham Town (10)	62
124	Longwell Green (10)	1–1 (4–5 p)	Shortwood United (10)	104
125	Longlevens (9)	4–4 (2–3 p)	Slimbridge (9)	120
126	Wantage Town (10)	1–1 (5–6 p)	Fairford Town (9)	94
127	Corsham Town (9)	2–0	Clanfield 85 (10)	71
128	Lydney Town (9)	3–2	Eversley & California (9)	87
129	Mendip Broadwalk (10)	1–1 (3–4 p)	Reading City (9)	106
130	Berks County (10)	5–2	Sandhurst Town (10)	88
131	Sheerwater (9)	2–1	Billingshurst (10)	56
132	Molesey (10)	2–0	Chessington & Hook United (10)	64
133	Eastbourne United (9)	2–0	Halls Athletic (10)	124
134	Staplehurst Monarchs (10)	2–0	Shoreham (9)	90
135	Hythe Town (9)	4–3	Athletic Newham (9)	121
137	Abbey Rangers (9)	3–1	Frimley Green (10)	81
138	Holmesdale (9)	1–2	Rochester United (10)	36
139	Phoenix Sports (9)	4–1	Sporting Bengal United (9)	84
140	Sutton Athletic (9)	2–1	Corinthian-Casuals (9)	50
141	Rusthall (9)	4–1	Seaford Town (9)	191
142	Corinthian (9)	3–0	Reigate Priory (10)	65
143	Bearsted (9)	2–2 (4–3 p)	Tooting Bec (10)	77
144	Peacehaven & Telscombe (9)	5–0	Westside (10)	112
146	Kennington (9)	4–1	FC Elmstead (10)	149
147	Little Common (9)	1–1 (4–1 p)	Godalming Town (10)	63
148	Balham (9)	3–2	Jarvis Brook (10)	82
149	Camberley Town (9)	1–1 (4–2 p)	Sporting Club Thamesmead (10)	49
150	Steyning Town Community (9)	3–0	Lewisham Borough (Community) (10)	80
151	Horsham YM (9)	0–1	Snodland Town (10)	67
152	Fisher (9)	4–1	Sutton Common Rovers (9)	152
153	Newhaven (9)	1–3	Faversham Strike Force (9)	84
154	Greenways (10)	3–2	Chipstead (9)	43
155	AFC Varndeanians (9)	2–2 (5–4 p)	Lydd Town (10)	71
156	Hollands & Blair (9)	0–5	SE Dons (10)	172
157	Roffey (9)	0–2	Haywards Heath Town (9)	122
158	Punjab United (9)	3–1	Wick (9)	63
159	Soul Tower Hamlets (9)	2–0	Bridon Ropes (10)	25
160	Hythe & Dibden (9)	3–0	Lymington Town (10)	102
161	Cowes Sports (9)	2–1	New Milton Town (9)	124
162	Sherborne Town (9)	2–0	East Cowes Victoria Athletic (9)	79
163	Warminster Town (10)	2–6	Hamworthy United (10)	167
164	Hamble Club (9)	1–2	Baffins Milton Rovers (9)	104
165	Laverstock & Ford (9)	1–2	Totton & Eling (10)	85
166	Fawley (10)	1–6	Portland United (9)	55
167	Selsey (10)	1–3	Amesbury Town (10)	101
169	Millbrook (Hampshire) (9)	2–1	Folland Sports (10)	52
170	Cove (10)	1–2	Alton (9)	97
171	Hamworthy Recreation (9)	3–1	Midhurst & Easebourne (9)	31
172	Whitchurch United (10)	3–2	Bournemouth Poppies (9)	132
173	Infinity (10)	1–1 (4–2 p)	Christchurch (10)	26
174	Barnstaple Town (9)	4–0	Cheddar (10)	126
175	Ilminster Town (10)	0–0 (4–2 p)	Paulton Rovers (9)	105
176	Cullompton Rangers (10)	4–2	Newquay (9)	92
177	Wellington AFC (9)	2–3	Penzance (10)	90
178	Buckland Athletic (9)	5–1	Ilfracombe Town (10)	83
179	Stoke Gabriel & Torbay Police (10)	3–0	Helston Athletic (9)	95
180	Sidmouth Town (9)	0–2	St. Blazey (9)	59
181	Torpoint Athletic (9)	0–5	Bovey Tracey (10)	127
182	Crediton United (10)	0–7	Street (9)	58
183	Bishops Lydeard (10)	2–1	Launceston (10)	40
184	Radstock Town (10)	1–0	Honiton Town (10)	84
185	Welton Rovers (10)	0–5	Shepton Mallet (9)	72
186	Teignmouth (10)	2–3	Ivybridge Town (9)	93
187	Bridgwater United (9)	1–1 (3–1 p)	Newton Abbot Spurs (10)	153
114	Virginia Water (9)	2–3	Kempston Rovers (9)	67
Sunday 21 September 2025
6	Campion (9)	3–1	Padiham (9)	152
Tuesday 23 September 2025
16	Holker Old Boys (10)	3–0	Route One Rovers (10)	80
Wednesday 24 September 2025
22	AFC Liverpool (9)	2–1	Daisy Hill (10)	93
Tuesday 30 September 2025
17	Thornton Cleveleys (10)	1–2	Colne (10)	219
Friday 3 October 2025
2	Billingham Synthonia (10)	1–1 (4–3 p)	Tow Law Town (9)	61
Match played at Stockton Town.
Saturday 4 October 2025
179	Stoke Gabriel & Torbay Police (10)	1–4	Helston Athletic (9)	95

== First round proper ==
The 187 winners from the previous round will face 23 teams exempt from the qualifying rounds in this round. The draw was made on 23 September 2025.

Number of teams per tier still in competition
Tier 9	Tier 10	Total
159 / 319	74 / 304	233 / 623

Tie	Home team	Score	Away team	Att.
Friday 17 October 2025
13	Redcar Town (10)	1–1 (5–4 p)	Tadcaster Albion (9)	204
54	Thetford Town (9)	5–4 (a.e.t.)	Fakenham Town (9)	267
29	Dudley Town (9)	1–0	Belper United (9)	209
44	Coventry United (9)	4–3	Harrowby United (9)	192
Saturday 18 October 2025
74	Molesey (10)	0–6	Haywards Heath Town (9)	50
78	Guernsey (9)	3–0	Staplehurst Monarchs (10)	417
1	Northwich Victoria (9)	1–1 (4–2 p)	Campion (9)	165
2	Irlam (9)	2–2 (5–4 p)	Shildon (9)	165
3	Euxton Villa (9)	1–1 (3–4 p)	Carlisle City (9)	152
4	Rossington Main (9)	3–1	Crowle Colts (10)	118
5	Burscough (9)	6–0	Billingham Synthonia (10)	200
6	Whitley Bay (9)	0–0 (3–4 p)	Barton Town (9)	441
7	Runcorn Town (10)	1–3	Fulwood Amateurs (10)	104
8	Winsford United (9)	1–0	Wombwell Town (9)	224
9	Horbury Town (9)	1–1 (3–4 p)	Charnock Richard (9)	122
11	Ashton Town (10)	1–0	Darwen (10)	124
12	Eccleshill United (9)	1–2	Chadderton (9)	70
14	Prestwich Heys (9)	9–1	Maltby Main (10)	239
16	Nelson (10)	3–0	Harrogate Railway Athletic (10)	99
17	Northallerton Town (9)	1–2	South Liverpool (9)	228
18	Wythenshawe (9)	2–2 (3–4 p)	Holker Old Boys (10)	211
19	Newcastle Benfield (9)	1–2	Liversedge (9)	186
20	Ramsbottom United (9)	3–0	Jarrow (10)	271
21	Barnoldswick Town (9)	1–0	AFC Liverpool (9)	112
22	Billingham Town (10)	1–2	Brigg Town (10)	182
23	Penistone Church (9)	1–2	Droylsden (10)	341
24	Sandiacre Town (10)	2–1	Stone Old Alleynians (9)	73
25	Newport Pagnell Town (9)	1–0	Lye Town (9)	413
26	Ardley United (9)	1–1 (1–3 p)	Northampton ON Chenecks (9)	102
27	Coalville Town (10)	2–3	Winslow United (9)	414
28	Bugbrooke St. Michaels (9)	1–2	Atherstone Town (9)	120
30	Irchester United (10)	2–3	Eastwood (9)	170
31	Melton Town (9)	0–4	Retford United (10)	129
32	Easington Sports (9)	0–3	Sherwood Colliery (9)	88
33	FC Stratford (10)	2–2 (3–5 p)	Bilston Town (10)	25
34	Newark Town (9)	5–5 (6–7 p)	Kimberley Miners Welfare (9)	167
35	Hanley Town (9)	1–1 (4–3 p)	Moulton (9)	62
36	Stafford Town (10)	3–3 (2–4 p)	Nuneaton Town (9)	315
37	Clifton All Whites (10)	1–1 (2–4 p)	Desborough Town (10)	86
38	Brocton (9)	1–2	Aylestone Park (9)	139
39	Gornal Athletic (10)	3–0	Coton Green (9)	150
40	Radford (10)	2–1	Droitwich Spa (9)	116
41	GNG Oadby Town (9)	0–0 (6–5 p)	Ashby Ivanhoe (9)	40
42	Gresley Rovers (9)	3–2	Northampton Sileby Rangers (9)	324
43	Lutterworth Town (9)	0–2	Heather St. Johns (10)	71
45	Chelmsley Town (10)	0–3	Kidlington (9)	120
46	Newark & Sherwood United (9)	0–1	Grantham Town (9)	273
47	Soul Tower Hamlets (9)	3–1	Letchworth Garden City Eagles (10)	75
48	Haverhill Rovers (9)	4–2	Halstead Town (9)	128
49	Ilford (9)	0–1	Little Oakley (9)	46
50	Cockfosters (9)	1–1 (12–11 p)	Tring Athletic (9)	115
51	Eynesbury Rovers (9)	3–0	Biggleswade United (9)	145
52	Wisbech Town (9)	1–6	Harpenden Town (9)	205

Tie	Home team	Score	Away team	Att.
53	Belstone (10)	2–4	Halesworth Town (10)	67
55	Great Yarmouth Town (9)	5–2	Kempston Rovers (9)	181
56	Hutton (10)	1–2	Haringey Borough (9)	132
57	Benfleet (9)	2–0	Great Wakering Rovers (9)	407
58	Hullbridge Sports (9)	0–3	Whittlesey Athletic (10)	92
59	AFC Welwyn (9)	3–1	Buckhurst Hill (9)	86
Match played at Hemel Hempstead Town.
60	Eaton Socon (10)	1–1 (4–3 p)	Ampthill Town (10)	91
61	Saffron Walden Town (9)	2–2 (3–1 p)	Brimsdown (10)	261
62	Lymore Gardens (10)	5–1	Framlingham Town (10)	129
63	Balham (9)	3–2	Thatcham Town (9)	62
64	SE Dons (10)	7–3	Bedfont (10)	436
65	Whitchurch United (10)	0–2	Windsor & Eton (9)	257
66	Bearsted (9)	1–0	Cowes Sports (9)	121
67	Punjab United (9)	1–0	Wembley (10)	82
68	Sheerwater (9)	3–0	Little Common (9)	70
69	AFC Varndeanians (9)	0–5	Sutton Athletic (9)	81
70	Burnham (9)	3–1	Spelthorne Sports (10)	58
71	Cove (10)	0–2	Snodland Town (9)	147
72	Berks County (10)	1–0	Phoenix Sports (9)	118
73	Tadley Calleva (9)	1–1 (4–3 p)	Tooting & Mitcham United (9)	107
75	London Samurai Rovers (10)	0–0 (4–3 p)	Abbey Rangers (9)	54
76	Faversham Strike Force (9)	2–1	Greenways (10)	152
77	Eastbourne United (9)	4–2	Sporting Club Thamesmead (10)	115
79	Rusthall (9)	0–1	Tunbridge Wells (9)	844
80	Kennington (9)	5–1	Rochester United (10)	102
81	Reading City (9)	4–0	Baffins Milton Rovers (9)	93
82	Corinthian (9)	7–1	Staines & Lammas (Middlesex) (10)	102
83	Hythe Town (9)	1–0	Peacehaven & Telscombe (9)	193
84	AFC Aldermaston (10)	1–2	Infinity (10)	70
85	Fisher (9)	0–0 (3–1 p)	Steyning Town Community (9)	270
86	Barnstaple Town (9)	5–0	Newent Town (10)	238
87	Shepton Mallet (9)	1–3	Corsham Town (9)	191
88	Bovey Tracey (10)	1–0	Radstock Town (10)	137
89	Bishops Lydeard (10)	2–2 (0–3 p)	Buckland Athletic (9)	59
90	Downton (9)	4–4 (4–3 p)	Sidmouth Town (9)	132
91	Ivybridge Town (9)	2–2 (5–3 p)	Totton & Eling (10)	76
92	Clevedon Town (9)	1–1 (2–4 p)	Cinderford Town (9)	135
93	Okehampton Argyle (10)	0–2	Sturminster Newton United (10)	85
94	Fairford Town (9)	0–0 (4–5 p)	Thornbury Town (9)	168
95	Penzance (10)	2–3	Hamworthy Recreation (9)	218
96	Slimbridge (9)	3–2	Wells City (10)	166
97	Bridgwater United (9)	0–3	Hythe & Dibden (9)	233
98	Hallen (9)	3–1	Newquay (9)	58
99	Street (9)	A–A	Shortwood United (10)	104
100	Sherborne Town (9)	3–0	Hamworthy United (10)	187
101	Calne Town (10)	1–2	Ilminster Town (10)	93
102	Helston Athletic (9)	4–0	Lydney Town (9)	73
103	Malmesbury Victoria (10)	1–2	Portland United (9)	143
104	Amesbury Town (10)	2–1	Highworth Town (9)	101
105	Cirencester Town (9)	0–1	Millbrook (Hampshire) (9)	135
Sunday 19 October 2025
10	Yarm & Eaglescliffe (10)	5–0	Colne (10)	200
15	West Allotment Celtic (9)	1–2	Cheadle Town (9)	95
Saturday 25 October 2025
99	Street (9)	1–1 (3–5 p)	Shortwood United (10)	112
Saturday 1 November 2025
18	Wythenshawe (9)	1–2	Holker Old Boys (10)	166

== Second round proper ==
The last 23 exempted teams compete in this round with the 105 winners from the previous round. The Draw was done on 20 October 2025.

Number of teams per tier still in competition
Tier 9	Tier 10	Total
97 / 319	28 / 304	128 / 623

Tie	Home team	Score	Away team	Att.
Friday 7 November 2025
41	London Samurai Rovers (10)	0-2	Haywards Heath Town (9)	98
48	Berks County (10)	0-0 (4–3 p)	Sutton Athletic (9)	157
Saturday 8 November 2025
7	Brigg Town (10)	1–2	West Didsbury & Chorlton (9)	344
47	Snodland Town (9)	4–2	Guernsey (9)	286
9	Charnock Richard (9)	0–2	Nelson (10)	132
20	GNG Oadby Town (9)	1–6	Clay Cross Town (9)	27
1	Cheadle Town (9)	0–0 (1–3 p)	North Shields (9)	128
2	Carlisle City (9)	2–2 (5–6 p)	Rossington Main (9)	205
3	Redcar Town (10)	0–2	Chadderton (9)	153
4	South Liverpool (9)	3–0	Barton Town (9)	151
5	Burscough (9)	3–1	Ashton Town (10)	156
6	Liversedge (9)	2–1	Atherton Laburnum Rovers (9)	228
8	Albion Sports (9)	3–2	Holker Old Boys (10)	38
11	Droylsden (10)	4–2	Northwich Victoria (9)	498
12	Prestwich Heys (9)	0–0 (4–2 p)	Irlam (9)	254
13	Crook Town (9)	0–4	Ramsbottom United (9)	215
14	Barnoldswick Town (9)	1–2	Winsford United (9)	160
15	Desborough Town (10)	3–1	Daventry Town (9)	144
15	Newport Pagnell Town (9)	1–2	Northampton ON Chenecks (9)	421
17	Hanley Town (9)	3–1	Kimberley Miners Welfare (9)	82
18	Gornal Athletic (10)	3–0	Atherstone Town (9)	167
19	Winslow United (9)	2–3	Bilston Town (10)	352
21	Coventry United (9)	5–0	Heanor Town (9)	117
22	Whitchurch Alport (9)	3–6	Radford (10)	138
23	Retford United (10)	2–1	Aylestone Park (9)	192
24	Sherwood Colliery (9)	1–0	Dudley Town (9)	123
25	Grantham Town (9)	2–2 (3–2 p)	Abbey Hulton United (9)	232
27	Sutton United (Birmingham) (10)	4–1	Gresley Rovers (9)	1,225
Sutton United (Birmingham) removed from competition for fielding an ineligible player.
28	Heather St John's (10)	3–1	Eastwood (9)	100
29	Haringey Borough (9)	3–1	Eynesbury Rovers (9)	228
30	Thetford Town (9)	1–1 (3–4 p)	Lymore Gardens (10)	229

Tie	Home team	Score	Away team	Att.
31	White Ensign (9)	1–4	Great Yarmouth Town (9)	85
32	AFC Welwyn (9)	2–2 (3–4 p)	Cockfosters (9)	59
33	Whittlesey Athletic (10)	1–3	Soul Tower Hamlets (9)	100
34	Little Oakley (9)	0–1	Harpenden Town (9)	91
35	Dereham Town (9)	2–1	Eaton Socon (10)	147
36	Walsham-le-Willows (9)	1–2	Benfleet (9)	127
37	Halesworth Town (10)	3–1	Haverhill Rovers (9)	258
38	Saffron Walden Town (9)	2–1	March Town United (9)	304
39	Eastbourne United (9)	1–0	Epsom & Ewell (9)	115
40	Windsor & Eton (9)	2–0	Bearsted (9)	418
42	Tunbridge Wells (9)	4–0	Sheerwater (9)	215
43	Punjab United (9)	2–1	Tadley Calleva (9)	88
44	Reading City (9)	1–0	Erith & Belvedere (9)	165
45	Infinity (10)	1–2	Whitstable Town (9)	102
46	Crawley Down Gatwick (9)	3–2	Kennington (9)	106
49	Fisher (9)	2–1	Balham (9)	186
50	Faversham Strike Force (9)	5–0	SE Dons (10)	393
51	Fleet Town (9)	3–1	Corinthian (9)	254
52	Hythe Town (9)	1–1 (3–4 p)	Burnham (9)	125
53	Ivybridge Town (9)	0–5	Slimbridge (9)	206
54	Cinderford Town (9)	1–1 (5–3 p)	Helston Athletic (9)	120
55	Downton (9)	4–1	Shortwood United (10)	130
56	Hythe & Dibden (9)	3–2	Thornbury Town (9)	114
57	Barnstaple Town (9)	3–1	Sherborne Town (9)	222
58	Buckland Athletic (9)	2–2 (12–11 p)	Millbrook (Hampshire) (9)	161
59	Bovey Tracey (10)	4–1	Corsham Town (9)	244
60	Roman Glass St George (9)	0–1	Hamworthy Recreation (9)	95
61	Amesbury Town (10)	1–0	Ilminster Town (10)	145
62	Andover New Street (9)	0–0 (1–4 p)	Hallen (9)	218
63	Kidlington (9)	3–4	AFC Stoneham (9)	128
64	Portland United (9)	0–0 (1–3 p)	Sturminster Newton United (10)	258
Sunday 9 November 2025
10	Yarm & Eaglescliffe (10)	2–2 (4–5 p)	Fulwood Amateurs (10)	220
26	Nuneaton Town (9)	2–1	Sandiacre Town (10)	523

== Third round proper ==
The 64 winners from the previous round will play in this round. 16 teams from the 10th tier remain in the competition. The draw was made on 10 November 2025.

Number of teams per tier still in competition
Tier 9	Tier 10	Total
49 / 319	15 / 304	64 / 623

Tie	Home team	Score	Away team	Att.
Saturday 6 December 2025
6	Rossington Main (9)	0–3	West Didsbury & Chorlton (9)	212
1	Ramsbottom United (9)	0–3	Nelson (10)	239
2	Winsford United (9)	P–P	Prestwich Heys (9)	
3	North Shields (9)	1–1 (6–5 p)	Liversedge (9)	198
4	Chadderton (9)	0–0 (5–4 p)	Burscough (9)	127
5	Droylsden (10)	2–0	Fulwood Amateurs (10)	328
7	Albion Sports (9)	0–3	South Liverpool (9)	79
8	Northampton On Chenecks (9)	0–3	Bilston Town (10)	163
10	Gornal Athletic (10)	P–P	Grantham Town (9)	
11	Radford (10)	0–5	Heather St Johns (10)	115
12	Gresley Rovers (9)	1–0	Desborough Town (10)	289
13	Sherwood Colliery (9)	2–1	Retford United (10)	219
14	GNG Oadby Town (9)	3–1	Nuneaton Town (9)	166
15	Harpenden Town (9)	3–2	Haringey Borough (9)	254
16	Lymore Gardens (10)	2–0	Halesworth Town (10)	344
Match played at Halesworth Town.
17	Dereham Town (9)	0–2	Benfleet (9)	208
18	Cockfosters (9)	1–1 (3–2 p)	Soul Tower Hamlets (9)	187
19	Saffron Walden Town (9)	0–0 (3–4 p)	Great Yarmouth Town (9)	342
20	Reading City (9)	3–1	Snodland Town (9)	144
21	Haywards Heath Town (9)	1–1 (4–3 p)	Berks County (10)	264

Tie	Home team	Score	Away team	Att.
23	Burnham (9)	1–2	Punjab United (9)	73
24	Whitstable Town (9)	3–0	Eastbourne United (9)	629
25	Fisher (9)	2–2 (8–7 p)	Fleet Town (9)	269
26	Tunbridge Wells (9)	P–P	Windsor & Eton (9)	
27	Bovey Tracey (10)	P–P	Downton (9)	
28	Slimbridge (9)	P–P	Amesbury Town (10)	
29	Buckland Athletic (9)	P–P	Barnstaple Town (9)	
30	Hallen (9)	P–P	Hamworthy Recreation (9)	
31	AFC Stoneham (9)	4–0	Cinderford Town (9)	113
32	Hythe & Dibden (9)	2–0	Sturminster Newton United (10)	130
Sunday 7 December 2025
9	Coventry United (9)	3–1	Hanley Town (9)	103
22	Faversham Strike Force (9)	1–2	Crawley Down Gatwick (9)	146
Match played at Whitstable Town.
Saturday 13 December 2025
2	Winsford United (9)	2–1	Prestwich Heys (9)	269
10	Gornal Athletic (10)	5–2	Grantham Town (9)	180
26	Tunbridge Wells (9)	1–3	Windsor & Eton (9)	225
27	Bovey Tracey (10)	1–3	Downton (9)	226
28	Slimbridge (9)	1–0	Amesbury Town (10)	107
29	Buckland Athletic (9)	2–2 (0–2 p)	Barnstaple Town (9)	206
30	Hallen (9)	3–0	Hamworthy Recreation (9)	48

== Fourth round proper ==
The 32 winners from the previous round will compete in this round. The draw was made on 8 December 2025.

Number of teams per tier still in competition
Tier 9	Tier 10	Total
26 / 319	6 / 304	32 / 623

Tie	Home team	Score	Away team	Att.
Saturday 17 January 2026
1	Droylsden (10)	2–1	Sherwood Colliery (9)	515
2	South Liverpool (9)	2–5	Winsford United (9)	261
3	Chadderton (9)	0–2	North Shields (9)	382
4	West Didsbury & Chorlton (9)	1–0	Nelson (10)	1,075
5	Coventry United (9)	6–0	GNG Oadby Town (9)	127
6	Bilston Town (10)	1–0	Gresley Rovers (9)	532
7	Heather St Johns (10)	0–4	Gornal Athletic (10)	288
8	Windsor & Eton (9)	P-P	Fisher (9)	
9	Reading City (9)	1–2	Lymore Gardens (10)	198
10	Benfleet (9)	0–2	Punjab United (9)	647

Tie	Home team	Score	Away team	Att.
11	Cockfosters (9)	2–1	Crawley Down Gatwick (9)	202
12	Great Yarmouth Town (9)	A–A	Haywards Heath Town (9)	639
13	Harpenden Town (9)	1–4	Whitstable Town (9)	743
14	Hallen (9)	1–1 (4–2 p)	Hythe & Dibden (9)	110
15	Barnstaple Town (9)	1–2	AFC Stoneham (9)	356
16	Downton (9)	0–0 (4–3 p)	Slimbridge (9)	186
Saturday 24 January 2026
8	Windsor & Eton (9)	1–1 (3–4 p)	Fisher (9)	596
Sunday 25 January 2026
12	Great Yarmouth Town (9)	0–1	Haywards Heath Town (9)	663

== Fifth round proper ==
Number of teams per tier still in competition
Tier 9	Tier 10	Total
12 / 319	4 / 304	16 / 623

Tie	Home team	Score	Away team	Att.
Saturday 7 February 2026
1	Hallen (9)	P–P	Gornal Athletic (10)	
2	Bilston Town (10)	0–2	Droylsden (10)	720
3	Coventry United (9)	2–1	North Shields (9)	347
4	West Didsbury & Chorlton (9)	P–P	Winsford United (9)	
5	Punjab United (9)	2–0	Fisher (9)	247
6	Downton (9)	3–0	Lymore Gardens (10)	308

Tie	Home team	Score	Away team	Att.
7	Haywards Heath Town (9)	P–P	AFC Stoneham (9)	
8	Whitstable Town (9)	1–1 (4–5 p)	Cockfosters (9)	1,547
Saturday 14 February 2026
1	Hallen (9)	3–0	Gornal Athletic (10)	247
4	West Didsbury & Chorlton (9)	4–1	Winsford United (9)	1,151
7	Haywards Heath Town (9)	1–1 (3–4 p)	AFC Stoneham (9)	684

== Quarter-finals ==
Number of teams per tier still in competition
Tier 9	Tier 10	Total
7 / 319	1 / 304	8 / 623

Tie	Home team	Score	Away team	Att.
Saturday 28 February 2026
1	Punjab United (9)	1–0	Downton (9)	655
2	AFC Stoneham (9)	3–0	Coventry United (9)	446
3	Hallen (9)	1–1 (6–5 p)	West Didsbury & Chorlton (9)	402
4	Droylsden (10)	2–4	Cockfosters (9)	1,503

== Semi-finals ==
=== First Leg ===
28 March 2026
15:00

Hallen	0–3	AFC Stoneham
		Sampson 13'; Jenkins 24'; Annetts 37'

The Hallen Centre, Hallen
Attendance: 430
28 March 2026
15:00

Cockfosters	1–1	Punjab United
Da Cruz 84'		Bushell 13'

Chalk Lane, Cockfosters
Attendance: 597

=== Second Leg ===
4 April 2026
15:00

AFC Stoneham	3–1	Hallen
Welch 26', 43'; Sampson 67'		Iles 79'

Stoneham Lane Complex, Eastleigh
Attendance: 851

AFC Stoneham won 6–1 on aggregate.

4 April 2026
15:00

Punjab United	0–2	Cockfosters
		Lutaaya 12'; Da Cruz 86'

Elite Venue, Gravesend
Attendance: 1,209

Cockfosters won 3–1 on aggregate.

== Final ==
17 May 2026
12:30 BST

A.F.C. Stoneham	0–0	Cockfosters
	Report
Penalties
Laycock (penalty scored); Thomson (penalty scored); Annetts (penalty scored); Sampson (penalty scored)	4–2	(penalty scored) Lutaaya; (penalty missed) Hastings; (penalty scored) Jessop; (penalty missed) Moses

Wembley Stadium, London
Referee: Elliott Bell (Liverpool FA)
