= 2024–25 Southern Combination Football League =

The 2024–25 Southern Combination Football League season is the 100th in the history of the competition, which lies at levels 9, 10 and 11 (steps 5 and 6, and county feeder) of the English football league system.

The constitution was announced by The Football Association on 17 May 2024.

== Premier Division ==
The Premier Division comprised 20 clubs from the previous season, 17 of which competed in the previous season

=== Team changes ===
To the Premier Division

Promoted from Division One

- Roffey
- Wick

Transferred from Wessex Football League Premier Division

- Petersfield Town

From the Premier Division

Promoted to the Isthmian League South East Division

- Eastbourne Town
- Steyning Town

Relegated to Division One

- AFC Uckfield Town

=== League table ===
Southern Combination League Premier Division
- Season: 2024–25
- Dates: 27 July 2024 - 26 April 2025
- Champions: Hassocks
- Promoted: Hassocks; Crowborough Athletic
- Relegated: Loxwood; Saltdean United
- Matches: 380
- Goals: 1,251 (3.29 per match)
- Top goalscorer: Harry Forster (21 goals)
- Biggest home win: Haywards Heath Town 9–1 Saltdean United (12 October 2024)
- Biggest away win: Loxwood FC 1-8 Roffey FC (16 November 2024)
- Highest scoring: Haywards Heath Town 9–1 Saltdean United (12 October 2024)
- Longest winning run: 9 Newhaven F.C. (15 February 2025 - 19 April 2025)
- Longest unbeaten run: 14 Roffey F.C. (12 October 2024 - 01 February 2025)
- Longest losing run: 7 Loxwood F.C. (27 October 2024 - 07 December 2024)
- Highest attendance: 807; Hassocks 3–0 Crowborough Athletic (29 March 2025)
- Lowest attendance: 32; Lingfield 1–4 AFC Varndeanians (7 December 2024); Lingfield 2–0 Little Common (21 December 2024)
- Total attendance: 60,315.0
- Average attendance: 158.72
- All statistics correct as of 11 May 2025.

Pos	Team	Pld	W	D	L	GF	GA	GD	Pts	Promotion, qualification or relegation
1	Hassocks (C, P)	38	31	4	3	101	29	+72	97	Promotion to the Isthmian League
2	Crowborough Athletic (O, P)	38	25	6	7	86	35	+51	81	Qualified for the play-offs, then promoted to Isthmian League
3	Eastbourne United Association	38	23	5	10	75	45	+30	74	Qualification for the play-offs
4	Haywards Heath Town	38	22	7	9	74	40	+34	73	Qualification for the play-offs
5	Petersfield Town	38	21	8	9	82	42	+40	71	Qualified for the play-offs and transferred to the Wessex League Premier Division
6	Crawley Down Gatwick	38	21	6	11	83	64	+19	69	
7	Peacehaven & Telscombe	38	20	7	11	75	51	+24	67	
8	Newhaven	38	20	3	15	74	68	+6	63	
9	Roffey	38	17	10	11	66	44	+22	61	
10	Bexhill United	38	15	9	14	68	55	+13	53 (Note: Bexhill United were deducted 1 point.)	
11	Midhurst & Easebourne	38	13	8	17	44	65	−21	47	
12	Horsham YMCA	38	11	9	18	61	71	−10	42	
13	AFC Varndeanians	38	12	6	20	51	81	−30	42	
14	Wick	38	11	7	20	50	79	−29	40	
15	Lingfield	38	9	11	18	47	77	−30	38	
16	Pagham	38	9	10	19	45	60	−15	37	
17	Little Common	38	8	7	23	34	71	−37	31	
18	Shoreham	38	7	8	23	39	88	−49	29	
19	Loxwood (R)	38	8	5	25	51	104	−53	29	Relegation to Division One
20	Saltdean United (R)	38	3	12	23	45	82	−37	21	Relegation to Division One

Source: SCFL Premier Division Table
Rules for classification: 1) points; 2) goal difference; 3) number of goals scored; 4) number of matches won; 5) head-to-head results
(C) Champions; (O) Play-off winners; (P) Promoted; (R) Relegated

=== Play-offs ===
Semi-finals
2	Crowborough Athletic	2
5	Petersfield Town	0
3	Eastbourne United	2
4	Haywards Heath Town	1

Final
Crowborough Athletic	2
Eastbourne United	1

==== Semifinals ====
29 April 2025	Eastbourne United	2–1	Haywards Heath Town	Eastbourne
19:45 GMT	James Hull 56'; Arthur Grout 90+2'	Report 1 Report 2	Flynn Bolton 47'	Stadium: The Oval; Attendance: 607; Referee: Paddy O'Reilly

29 April 2025	Crowborough Athletic	2–0	Petersfield Town	Crowborough
19:45 GMT	Forster 18' Goldsmith 75'	Report 1 Report 2		Stadium: Crowborough Community Stadium; Attendance: 423; Referee: Ryan Calver

==== Final ====
4 May 2025	Crowborough Athletic	2-1	Eastbourne United	Crowborough
15:00 GMT	Smikle 1', 4'		Ball 45'	Stadium: Crowborough Community Stadium; Attendance: 1,105; Referee: Matthew Dyson

=== Results table ===
Home \ Away	VAR	BEX	CDG	CRO	EBU	HHT	HSK	HYM	LIN	LCM	LOX	MID	NEW	PAG	PAT	PET	ROF	SDU	SHO	WIC
AFC Varndeanians		0–3	2–2	0–1	1–1	2–1	1–5	0–4	2–1	5–0	3–1	2–2	1–2	2–0	1–4	0–4	1–2	3–2	0–2	0–3
Bexhill United	3–0		1–1	2–2	1–3	1–0	0–3	1–0	1–1	0–2	5–0	4–0	2–1	4–2	2–2	1–2	0–0	2–1	3–1	2–1
Crawley Down Gatwick	0–1	3–2		0–4	3–2	2–2	3–0	4–3	2–0	3–0	3–2	2–2	4–3	1–0	4–0	1–5	1–0	2–0	4–1	1–3
Crowborough Athletic	5–0	3–5	1–0		1–1	2–1	2–1	2–2	2–1	1–0	1–0	0–1	3–0	4–0	2–1	0–3	1–0	5–0	3–1	4–1
Eastbourne United Association	0–1	2–1	0–3	3–1		3–1	1–2	2–0	3–2	3–0	2–0	3–0	4–1	3–2	0–2	2–2	4–2	6–1	1–0	2–1
Haywards Heath Town	1–1	3–1	3–1	1–0	2–0		2–2	1–0	2–0	3–0	3–2	1–0	2–0	1–1	1–0	1–3	0–2	9–1	1–0	1–1
Hassocks	2–0	2–1	4–1	3–0	3–1	3–0		4–1	6–0	3–1	4–1	2–1	5–0	4–0	2–1	3–1	1–3	1–0	2–1	1–1
Horsham YMCA	2–1	0–0	0–4	0–4	2–4	3–1	0–3		2–2	5–0	2–2	2–0	0–3	0–2	2–2	2–2	1–1	2–1	1–2	3–0
Lingfield	1–4	1–0	1–3	0–2	1–4	2–1	2–2	2–1		2–0	2–2	0–0	0–1	3–3	2–2	2–1	0–7	2–1	3–1	1–2
Little Common	3–2	1–0	1–2	1–2	1–2	0–2	0–0	3–2	1–1		1–0	1–2	0–1	0–4	0–1	0–3	1–1	1–1	2–3	2–3
Loxwood	2–3	2–2	1–2	0–6	0–2	1–4	0–3	0–1	3–2	3–2		4–4	1–4	0–3	3–1	1–1	1–8	2–1	3–1	4–3
Midhurst & Easebourne	2–1	0–5	2–0	0–4	0–2	0–3	0–2	0–3	3–1	1–3	3–0		1–2	1–1	2–0	3–1	2–0	1–0	1–1	1–2
Newhaven	2–1	2–2	3–5	3–2	0–1	2–4	1–3	3–3	4–1	0–1	4–0	2–3		1–0	1–3	2–1	3–1	3–2	5–1	3–1
Pagham	1–2	0–1	5–0	0–2	1–0	0–3	0–3	3–1	0–0	1–1	3–2	1–2	1–2		1–2	1–2	1–3	1–1	1–1	1–0
Peacehaven & Telscombe	5–1	2–0	3–0	1–1	0–3	0–3	1–3	3–1	3–0	3–0	5–4	1–1	2–0	2–2		2–1	0–1	1–1	3–0	5–1
Petersfield Town	5–0	3–2	0–5	0–0	2–0	0–0	0–1	3–2	1–1	2–1	5–0	2–0	1–2	2–1	3–0		1–1	1–0	6–1	0–1
Roffey	3–1	3–1	2–2	1–3	2–0	1–1	0–4	1–2	2–1	1–0	2–0	2–0	2–2	0–1	0–1	1–5		4–0	1–1	0–0
Saltdean United	1–3	2–2	2–2	1–1	2–2	2–3	1–2	1–1	1–1	2–2	2–3	1–2	1–2	3–0	1–5	0–0	0–0		4–2	1–2
Shoreham	1–1	3–2	0–5	1–4	0–2	0–2	0–4	2–3	1–3	1–1	1–0	0–0	1–0	1–1	0–2	1–2	1–4	0–4		3–3
Wick	2–2	1–3	3–2	0–5	1–1	1–4	1–4	2–1	1–2	0–1	0–1	3–1	2–4	0–0	1–4	1–6	0–2	1–0	1–2	

Legend: Blue = home team win; Yellow = draw; Red = away team win.

=== Results by matchday ===
Matchday	1	2	3	4	5	6	7	8	9	10	11	12	13	14	15	16	17	18	19	20	21	22	23	24	25	26	27	28	29	30	31	32	33	34	35	36	37	38
AFC Varndeanians	L	L	L	D	W	L	W	W	W	W	L	L	W	L	W	L	L	W	W	L	L	D	W	L	L	D	L	D	L	L	L	L	D	L	D	W	L	W
Bexhill United	D	L	L	D	W	L	W	L	D	D	W	W	W	D	W	W	W	L	W	L	L	L	L	W	D	W	D	D	L	W	D	W	L	L	W	L	L	W
Crawley Down Gatwick	L	W	W	W	L	W	W	W	L	L	W	W	L	D	D	W	L	D	D	W	W	W	W	W	L	W	D	W	W	L	W	L	W	W	D	L	W	L
Crowborough Athletic	L	D	W	L	L	L	D	W	W	W	W	W	L	W	W	D	W	W	W	W	W	D	L	W	D	W	W	W	W	W	W	W	L	W	W	D	W	W
Eastbourne United Association	L	D	L	L	L	D	L	W	W	W	W	L	W	L	W	W	W	W	D	W	W	L	W	W	W	W	D	D	W	L	L	W	W	W	W	W	W	W
Hassocks	W	W	D	D	W	W	W	W	W	W	W	W	L	W	W	W	W	W	W	W	D	L	W	W	W	W	W	L	W	W	W	W	W	W	W	D	W	W
Haywards Heath Town	W	W	W	W	D	W	W	W	W	L	W	W	W	W	W	D	D	L	L	L	D	D	L	W	D	W	W	W	L	L	W	W	D	W	L	W	L	W
Horsham YMCA	W	W	D	L	W	D	D	L	L	L	W	L	D	L	W	L	L	L	W	D	L	L	W	W	L	L	L	D	L	L	D	D	L	L	W	W	W	D
Lingfield	L	W	D	D	L	L	D	L	D	L	L	D	L	W	L	L	L	L	L	W	L	W	D	D	D	D	W	W	L	W	L	L	D	W	W	L	L	D
Little Common	L	L	L	L	D	L	D	L	L	L	L	L	L	W	L	L	L	L	W	L	D	L	W	L	W	L	L	D	W	L	W	W	L	D	L	D	W	D
Loxwood	D	W	W	W	D	L	W	L	L	L	L	W	L	L	L	L	L	L	L	W	L	D	D	L	L	L	L	L	L	L	W	W	D	L	L	L	L	L
Midhurst & Easebourne	W	L	W	D	L	L	W	W	W	D	L	W	L	D	W	L	W	D	L	W	D	D	D	L	L	W	L	D	L	W	L	L	L	L	L	W	L	W
Newhaven	W	L	D	D	W	W	L	W	L	L	W	L	L	D	L	W	W	W	L	L	W	W	W	L	L	L	W	W	W	W	W	W	W	W	W	W	L	L
Pagham	W	L	L	W	D	L	L	D	L	L	D	L	L	W	W	L	L	L	W	W	L	D	D	L	D	D	L	W	W	W	L	L	D	L	L	L	D	D
Peacehaven & Telscombe	W	W	L	W	W	W	L	L	W	L	L	W	W	D	L	D	W	W	L	W	D	D	L	D	L	W	D	W	W	L	W	W	D	W	W	W	W	L
Petersfield Town	W	W	W	W	D	L	L	L	W	W	W	D	D	W	D	D	W	W	W	L	W	L	D	W	L	D	W	D	W	W	L	W	W	W	L	L	W	W
Roffey	D	L	W	D	D	D	W	W	L	W	L	W	W	D	D	W	W	W	W	W	D	W	W	W	W	L	D	L	W	L	L	L	W	D	D	L	L	L
Saltdean United	L	L	L	D	L	W	W	D	L	D	L	L	L	D	L	L	L	L	D	D	D	L	D	D	D	W	L	L	L	D	L	L	L	L	L	D	L	L
Shoreham	L	L	L	D	D	W	L	L	D	L	W	L	W	L	L	W	L	D	D	W	L	D	W	L	L	L	L	L	L	D	L	L	L	L	D	L	W	L
Wick	D	W	D	L	D	D	W	L	D	W	L	L	W	L	L	W	D	L	L	L	W	L	L	L	L	L	L	W	W	W	W	L	L	L	L	W	D	L

Updated to match(es) played on 26 April 2025. Source:
W = Win; D = Draw; L = Loss

=== Top scorers ===
Rank	Player	Club	Goals
1	Harry Forster	Crowborough Athletic F.C.	21
2	Harrison Cable	Petersfield Town F.C.	20
3	Joshua Irish	Wick F.C.	20
4	Lee Robinson	Newhaven F.C.	20
5	Oliver Leslie	Crawley Down Gatwick F.C.	18
6	Lewis Rustell	Midhurst & Easebourne F.C.	17
7	Rushaar Samuel-Smikle	Crowborough Athletic F.C.	17
8	Alex Fair	Hassocks F.C.	16
9	Ruari Farrell	Hassocks F.C.	16
10	Lewis Gould	Crawley Down Gatwick F.C.	15

=== Stadia and locations ===
Map showing the location of teams in the Premier Division

Team	Location	Stadium	Capacity
AFC Varndeanians	Brighton (Withdean)	Withdean Stadium	8,850
Bexhill United	Bexhill-on-Sea	The Polegrove	1,000
Crawley Down Gatwick	Crawley Down	The Haven Centre	1,000
Crowborough Athletic	Crowborough	Crowborough Community Stadium	2,000
Eastbourne United Association	Eastbourne	The Oval	1,200
Hassocks	Hassocks	The Beacon	1,000
Haywards Heath Town	Haywards Heath	Hanbury Park	2,000
Horsham YMCA	Horsham	Gorings Mead	1,500
Lingfield	Lingfield	The Sports Pavilion	2,000
Little Common	Bexhill-on-Sea (Little Common)	Little Common Recreation Ground	1,200
Loxwood	Loxwood	Plaistow Road	1,000
Midhurst & Easebourne	Easebourne	Rotherfield	1,000
Newhaven	Newhaven	The Trafalgar Ground	3,000
Pagham	Pagham	Nyetimber Lane	1,500
Peacehaven & Telscombe	Peacehaven	The Sports Park	3,000
Petersfield Town	Petersfield	The Southdown Builders Stadium	3,000
Roffey	Horsham (Roffey)	Bartholomew Way	1,000
Saltdean United	Brighton (Saltdean)	Hill Park	1,000
Shoreham	Shoreham-by-Sea	Middle Road	2,000
Wick	Littlehampton (Wick)	Crabtree Park	2,000

== Division One ==
Division One increased from 18 clubs to 20, 16 of which competed from the previous season. Oakwood were reprieved from relegation

=== Team changes ===
To Division One

Promoted from Division Two

- Storrington Community

Promoted from Hampshire Premier League Senior Division

- Infinity

Promoted from Mid-Sussex League

- Reigate Priory

Relegated from the Premier Division

- AFC Uckfield Town

From Division One

Promoted to the Premier Division

- Roffey
- Wick

=== League table ===
Southern Combination League Division One
- Season: 2024–25
- Dates: 03 August 2024 - 26 April 2025
- Champions: Seaford Town F.C.
- Promoted: Seaford Town; Forest Row
- Relegated: Storrington Community; Montpelier Villa; Alfold
- Matches: 380
- Goals: 1,386 (3.65 per match)
- Top goalscorer: Zion McLeod (27 Goals)
- Biggest home win: Billingshurst 7-0 Alfold (08 August 2024)
- Biggest away win: Copthorne 0-7 Worthing United (07 September 2024)
- Highest scoring: Dorking Wanderers B 8–3 Arundel (24 August 2024)
- Longest winning run: 9 Arundel F.C. (25 March 2025 - 26 April 2025)
- Longest unbeaten run: 15 Chessington & Hook United F.C. (18 February 2025 - 26 April 2025)
- Longest losing run: 14 Montpelier Villa F.C. (03 August 2024 - 09 November 2024)
- Highest attendance: 332; Seaford Town 1–0 Forest Row (29 March 2025)
- Lowest attendance: 20; Banstead Athletic 2–7 AFC Uckfield Town (28 September 2024)
- Total attendance: 27,872
- Average attendance: 73.3

Pos	Team	Pld	W	D	L	GF	GA	GD	Pts	Promotion, qualification or relegation
1	Seaford Town (C, P)	38	28	3	7	101	37	+64	87	Promotion to the Premier Division
2	Forest Row (Q, P)	38	26	7	5	107	41	+66	85	Qualified for the play-offs, then promoted to the Premier Division
3	Godalming Town	38	24	10	4	72	27	+45	82	Qualified for the play-offs
4	Dorking Wanderers B	38	23	2	13	104	66	+38	71	
5	Infinity	38	19	11	8	83	50	+33	68	Qualified for the play-offs
6	Arundel	38	21	5	12	87	72	+15	68	Qualified for the play-offs
7	Worthing United	38	19	7	12	74	46	+28	64	
8	Chessington & Hook United	38	18	9	11	81	69	+12	63	Transfer to the Southern Counties East Division One
9	AFC Uckfield Town	38	18	4	16	68	66	+2	58	
10	Billingshurst	38	16	6	16	69	64	+5	54	
11	Reigate Priory	38	16	5	17	67	66	+1	53	
12	Oakwood	38	16	5	17	57	70	−13	53	
13	Mile Oak	38	15	4	19	52	57	−5	49	
14	East Preston	38	14	4	20	61	73	−12	46	
15	Selsey	38	11	12	15	62	65	−3	45	
16	Storrington Community (R)	38	11	7	20	66	71	−5	40	Relegation to the Division Two
17	Banstead Athletic	38	10	5	23	55	98	−43	35	Transfer to the Southern Counties East Division One
18	Copthorne	38	6	7	25	48	114	−66	25	Reprieved from relegation
19	Montpelier Villa (R)	38	4	5	29	40	109	−69	17	Relegation to the Mid Sussex League Division 3 North
20	Alfold (R)	38	4	4	30	32	125	−93	16	Relegation to the Division Two

Source: SCFL Division One League Table
Rules for classification: 1) points; 2) goal difference; 3) number of goals scored; 4) number of matches won; 5) head-to-head results
(C) Champions; (P) Promoted; (Q) Qualified for the phase indicated; (R) Relegated

=== Play-offs ===
Semi-finals
2	Forest Row	3 (3)
6	Arundel	3 (2)
3	Godalming Town	0 (2)
5	Infinity	0 (3)

Final
2	Forest Row	1
5	Infinity	0

==== Semifinals ====
29 April 2025	Godalming Town	0–0 (3–4 p)	Infinity	Godalming
19:45 GMT		Report		Stadium: Bill Kyte Stadium; Attendance: 501; Referee: Harvey Ransome

29 April 2025	Forest Row	3–3 (3–2 p)	Arundel	East Grinstead
19:45 GMT	Donaghey 21'; Aubrey 59'; Gayler 79'	Report	Gratwick; Herbert	Stadium: East Court; Attendance: 201; Referee: Greig Walker

==== Final ====
3 May 2025	Forest Row	1–0	Infinity	East Grinstead
15:00 GMT	Carmo 90+3'			Stadium: East Court; Attendance: 408; Referee: Thomas Price

=== Results table ===
Home \ Away	UCK	ALF	ARU	BAN	BIL	CHU	COP	DOR	EPR	FOR	GOD	INF	MOK	MON	OAK	REI	SEA	SEL	STO	WOR
AFC Uckfield Town		0–2	1–5	4–1	0–1	1–3	3–1	4–2	1–3	0–5	1–5	2–0	3–4	4–1	2–0	5–3	1–1	1–0	2–0	0–2
Alfold	0–0		1–3	0–3	0–4	1–6	2–4	1–4	0–5	1–7	0–2	0–3	1–3	3–1	1–2	1–3	0–3	2–2	3–7	2–2
Arundel	0–1	6–2		4–3	1–2	2–3	4–3	3–2	5–1	0–6	2–0	0–0	3–3	4–1	2–3	2–1	3–5	3–0	1–1	2–0
Banstead Athletic	2–7	2–0	2–1		1–2	1–1	4–1	0–5	1–3	0–3	1–1	2–1	2–3	1–2	2–0	0–1	1–2	3–3	1–0	1–5
Billingshurst	2–0	7–0	1–2	3–2		1–3	3–0	2–3	1–2	1–1	1–2	2–2	1–1	3–1	2–0	6–2	1–6	1–2	3–1	0–2
Chessington & Hook United	2–1	5–0	1–1	2–0	2–3		2–1	1–0	1–0	4–4	1–4	0–2	1–0	2–1	2–2	0–3	1–3	2–1	4–3	3–3
Copthorne	1–4	5–1	3–2	1–3	3–2	1–3		1–7	0–2	1–6	1–1	2–6	1–1	2–2	1–2	2–1	0–5	2–5	0–4	0–7
Dorking Wanderers B	2–0	3–0	8–3	7–2	2–1	3–1	2–1		3–4	0–2	1–4	3–3	1–0	4–0	5–1	4–2	2–1	1–1	3–2	2–0
East Preston	0–2	2–0	0–1	0–1	0–1	3–3	2–2	2–5		0–3	1–2	4–2	2–3	2–0	2–3	2–1	0–3	1–4	1–4	2–0
Forest Row	3–1	3–1	2–3	6–0	2–2	2–0	5–2	3–1	3–2		1–1	2–2	2–1	5–0	0–1	2–1	1–0	0–0	3–2	3–1
Godalming Town	2–0	2–0	4–1	5–0	1–0	2–2	0–0	2–1	1–2	2–1		1–1	1–0	3–1	0–0	2–0	1–0	0–0	3–0	1–0
Infinity	1–2	3–0	0–1	3–3	2–2	4–2	4–0	1–0	1–3	4–4	1–1		3–0	3–0	5–2	0–1	3–1	2–2	1–0	1–0
Mile Oak	2–1	3–0	1–2	2–0	4–0	1–5	1–0	1–2	2–0	0–1	0–2	0–3		0–0	0–1	0–1	0–3	2–1	2–0	2–0
Montpelier Villa	2–2	0–1	1–6	5–2	2–4	5–2	0–3	0–3	3–1	1–3	0–2	0–3	0–5		2–3	2–4	0–2	2–2	0–1	1–1
Oakwood	0–1	1–2	1–2	2–2	0–2	0–2	1–1	4–1	2–1	0–3	0–3	1–6	5–1	3–0		1–1	1–7	2–0	3–1	0–2
Reigate Priory	4–0	3–0	1–2	4–1	2–0	3–4	1–0	3–2	0–2	1–2	1–1	2–3	0–3	3–2	1–4		1–1	3–2	1–1	2–3
Seaford Town	2–3	5–0	4–1	4–3	5–1	2–1	5–0	4–3	2–0	1–0	2–0	0–0	2–0	4–0	0–2	2–1		4–1	4–0	3–1
Selsey	0–5	3–3	1–2	0–1	0–0	2–2	3–0	3–4	4–1	1–3	1–4	0–2	1–0	4–0	3–1	1–1	3–0		2–0	1–1
Storrington Community	1–2	5–0	2–2	2–1	3–0	2–2	2–2	0–2	2–2	1–4	3–1	1–2	3–0	3–1	2–1	1–2	1–2	1–3		2–2
Worthing United	1–1	3–1	1–0	3–0	2–1	1–0	6–0	3–1	1–1	2–1	0–3	4–0	3–1	6–1	0–2	0–2	0–1	3–0	3–2	

Legend: Blue = home team win; Yellow = draw; Red = away team win.

=== Results by matchday ===
Matchday	1	2	3	4	5	6	7	8	9	10	11	12	13	14	15	16	17	18	19	20	21	22	23	24	25	26	27	28	29	30	31	32	33	34	35	36	37	38
AFC Uckfield Town	L	W	L	W	W	D	W	W	L	W	W	W	L	W	L	W	L	L	W	W	L	L	W	L	W	L	W	W	L	L	W	D	L	W	D	D	L	L
Alfold	L	L	L	L	L	L	W	L	L	L	L	L	W	L	L	W	L	L	D	L	D	L	L	L	L	L	L	L	L	L	W	L	L	L	D	L	L	D
Arundel	L	W	W	W	L	W	W	D	L	L	D	L	W	W	L	W	L	L	W	L	L	W	D	D	L	L	W	W	D	W	W	W	W	W	W	W	W	W
Banstead Athletic	L	D	L	L	L	W	W	W	W	L	L	D	D	W	L	L	L	L	L	L	D	L	W	L	L	W	W	L	L	W	L	L	W	L	L	L	D	L
Billingshurst	W	W	W	D	W	L	W	W	L	W	W	L	D	W	L	W	L	D	L	L	W	L	W	L	L	L	L	L	W	W	D	D	L	L	D	W	W	L
Chessington & Hook United	W	L	W	L	D	L	D	D	W	L	L	L	L	W	W	W	W	W	W	L	L	L	L	W	W	W	W	W	D	W	D	W	W	W	D	D	D	D
Copthorne	L	L	L	L	L	L	D	L	W	L	L	D	L	W	L	L	L	L	W	W	L	L	L	L	D	D	L	D	D	L	L	D	L	W	L	L	W	L
Dorking Wanderers B	L	W	W	W	W	L	L	W	W	W	W	W	L	L	W	W	W	W	W	L	L	W	W	W	W	W	D	W	L	W	D	L	L	L	W	W	L	L
East Preston	D	W	W	W	W	L	D	W	L	W	W	L	L	L	L	L	W	L	L	L	L	W	L	L	W	L	W	L	D	W	W	L	W	D	L	L	L	L
Forest Row	W	W	W	D	W	W	D	D	W	W	L	D	W	W	W	D	W	W	W	W	W	W	W	L	L	W	W	W	W	D	W	L	D	L	W	W	W	W
Godalming Town	D	D	W	W	D	L	W	W	L	D	D	D	D	W	D	W	W	W	W	W	W	D	L	W	W	W	W	W	W	W	D	W	L	W	W	W	W	W
Infinity	W	L	L	W	L	W	D	L	D	D	W	D	D	L	W	W	D	W	W	D	W	W	W	D	L	D	W	W	D	L	L	W	W	W	D	W	W	W
Mile Oak	W	L	L	W	W	L	L	L	W	W	W	L	W	L	W	L	L	W	D	L	D	L	L	L	D	L	W	W	D	L	W	W	W	L	L	L	L	W
Montpelier Villa	L	L	L	L	L	L	L	L	L	L	L	L	L	L	W	L	L	W	D	D	L	W	L	L	L	D	L	D	L	L	L	L	L	D	L	L	L	W
Oakwood	W	L	L	L	L	D	L	L	L	W	W	D	D	L	W	L	L	W	L	W	W	L	L	W	W	L	W	W	L	W	L	W	W	L	W	W	D	D
Reigate Priory	L	L	W	W	L	W	D	L	L	L	W	W	L	L	D	W	L	L	L	L	W	W	D	W	L	W	L	D	W	W	W	L	W	L	W	L	D	W
Seaford Town	W	W	W	W	W	W	D	W	L	W	W	D	W	L	W	W	L	W	W	W	W	W	L	W	W	W	W	W	W	D	L	L	W	W	L	W	W	W
Selsey	D	L	W	L	L	L	D	L	L	L	W	W	W	L	W	L	W	W	W	D	D	D	W	D	W	L	D	L	D	D	L	D	D	W	L	L	L	D
Storrington Community	D	W	L	L	W	W	D	W	W	D	W	W	L	D	L	L	L	L	L	W	L	W	L	L	W	L	L	L	L	W	D	D	L	L	L	D	L	L
Worthing United	W	W	L	L	L	W	W	W	W	L	W	L	W	D	W	W	D	W	L	W	D	L	L	L	L	W	W	D	W	L	W	D	W	W	D	D	W	L

Source: SCFL Division One League Table
W = Win; D = Draw; L = Loss

=== Top scorers ===
Rank	Player	Club	Goals
1	Zion McLeod	East Preston F.C.	27
2	Oliver Rawlins	Dorking Wanderers B	26
3	Callum Connor	Seaford Town	23
4	Emeka Okakpu	Banstead Athletic F.C.	23
5	Thomas Tierney	Infinity F.C.	22
6	Jacob Todman	Dorking Wanderers B	21
7	Curtis Gayler	Forest Row F.C.	20
8	Hayden Beaconsfield	Seaford Town F.C.	19
9	Matthew Hards	Storrington F.C.	18
10	Joshua Wright	Seaford Town F.C.	18

=== Stadia and locations ===
Map showing the location of teams in Division 1

Team	Location	Stadium	Capacity
AFC Uckfield Town	Framfield	The Oaks	600
Alfold	Alfold Crossways	Alfold Recreation Ground	1,000
Arundel	Arundel	Mill Road	2,200
Banstead Athletic	Tadworth	Merland Rise	1,500
Billingshurst	Billingshurst	Jubilee Fields	—
Chessington & Hook United	Chessington	Chalky Lane	3,000
Copthorne	Copthorne	Camping World Community Stadium (groundshare with Horsham)	1,300
Dorking Wanderers B	Dorking	Meadowbank	3,000
East Preston	Littlehampton (East Preston)	The Lashmar	1,000
Forest Row	Crawley (Three Bridges)	East Court (groundshare with East Grinstead Town)	3,000
Godalming Town	Godalming	Bill Kyte Stadium	3,000
Infinity	Sidlesham	Sidlesham Recreation Ground	—
Mile Oak	Brighton (Mile Oak)	Mile Oak Recreation Ground	—
Montpelier Villa	Lancing	Culver Road (groundshare with Lancing)	1,500
Oakwood	Crawley (Three Bridges)	Tinsley Lane	—
Reigate Priory	Reigate	Park Lane	—
Seaford Town	Seaford	The Crouch	—
Selsey	Selsey	Bunn Leisure Stadium	—
Storrington Community	Storrington	The Recreation Ground, Storrington	—
Worthing United	Worthing (Broadwater)	The Robert Albon Memorial Ground	1,504

== Division Two ==
Division Two increased by three to 14 teams after Storrington were promoted to Division One, and Chichester City B, TD Shipley and Worthing Town joined the league. Rottingdean Village left the league immediately prior to the start of the season

=== Team changes ===
To Division Two

- Chichester City B
- Worthing Town

Promoted from West Sussex Premier

- TD Shipley

From Division Two

Promoted to Division One

- Storrington

Left League

- Rottingdean Village

Southern Combination League Division Two
- Season: 2024–25
- Dates: 10 August 2024 - 19 April 2025
- Champions: Rustington F.C.
- Promoted: Jarvis Brook
- Matches: 156
- Goals: 684 (4.38 per match)
- Top goalscorer: Adam Campbell-Stone (29 Goals)

Promotion from this division is dependant on ground grading as well as league position.

=== League table ===
Pos	Team	Pld	W	D	L	GF	GA	GD	Pts	
1	Rustington (C)	24	22	2	0	89	20	+69	68	
2	Jarvis Brook (P)	24	17	4	3	79	22	+57	55	Promotion to Division One
3	Hailsham Town	24	13	4	7	52	37	+15	43	
4	Southwater	24	12	6	6	47	33	+14	42	
5	Capel	24	12	5	7	63	48	+15	41	
6	TD Shipley	24	11	4	9	63	40	+23	37	
7	St Francis Rangers	24	10	7	7	50	39	+11	37	
8	Chichester City B	24	10	4	10	51	48	+3	34	
9	Ferring	24	7	3	14	50	57	−7	24	
10	Worthing Town	24	6	5	13	49	60	−11	23	
11	Brighton Electricity	24	5	2	17	36	74	−38	17	
12	Upper Beeding	24	4	3	17	32	93	−61	15	
13	Bosham	24	2	1	21	23	113	−90	7	

Source: The FA Full-Time SCFL Division 2 Table
Rules for classification: 1) points; 2) goal difference; 3) number of goals scored.
(C) Champions; (P) Promoted

=== Results table ===
Home \ Away	BOS	BRE	CAP	CCB	FER	HAI	JAR	RUS	SOU	STF	TDS	UBD	WOT
Bosham		2–5	2–4	2–0	0–5	0–2	0–7	3–7	1–6	0–4	0–8	1–2	3–3
Brighton Electricity	1–0		2–3	2–2	2–0	2–2	1–4	0–3	1–2	0–2	3–2	2–0	1–3
Capel	2–0	6–1		1–0	3–2	4–1	2–1	1–4	0–0	2–2	2–2	4–0	2–2
Chichester City B	4–2	4–1	4–3		4–1	2–4	1–2	A/W	3–0	3–1	1–2	4–3	3–1
Ferring	2–0	5–4	1–3	1–2		2–3	0–4	1–2	1–2	1–1	6–5	7–0	3–0
Hailsham Town	6–0	2–0	4–2	1–1	3–2		3–4	1–3	2–2	1–0	0–2	4–0	H/W
Jarvis Brook	6–0	10–1	3–2	6–1	3–0	1–0		0–1	2–2	3–3	1–0	8–0	3–0
Rustington	9–0	4–3	7–0	4–1	1–0	1–0	1–1		3–0	3–2	2–0	10–1	7–0
Southwater	6–0	2–1	2–1	2–1	5–1	2–0	0–4	0–2		2–0	3–2	5–0	1–1
St Francis Rangers	6–2	5–0	3–2	2–2	2–2	0–4	0–3	2–2	2–0		2–1	4–1	0–2
TD Shipley	7–1	4–0	1–1	3–3	7–2	1–2	2–0	1–5	2–0	0–0		4–0	2–1
Upper Beeding	2–3	3–2	2–8	2–1	1–1	3–4	1–1	2–4	1–1	1–3	4–3		3–5
Worthing Town	9–1	4–1	2–5	2–1	0–4	3–3	1–2	1–4	2–2	2–4	1–2	4–0	

Source: SCFL Fixtures and Results
Legend: Blue = home team win; Yellow = draw; Red = away team win.

=== Results by matchday ===
Matchday	1	2	3	4	5	6	7	8	9	10	11	12	13	14	15	16	17	18	19	20	21	22	23	24
Bosham	L	L	L	W	L	L	L	L	D	L	L	L	L	L	L	W	L	L	L	L	L	L	L	L
Brighton Electricity	L	L	L	L	L	L	L	L	L	L	L	W	W	L	L	L	W	W	L	D	D	W	L	L
Capel	W	W	W	L	D	W	W	D	W	W	L	L	L	L	W	D	L	D	W	L	W	W	W	D
Chichester City B	L	L	W	L	D	L	L	L	W	L	W	L	L	L	W	W	W	W	D	W	W	W	D	D
Ferring	L	L	L	L	W	L	D	L	L	W	W	L	W	L	D	D	L	L	W	W	L	L	W	L
Hailsham Town	W	L	L	W	W	W	D	D	W	W	L	W	W	W	L	D	L	W	D	L	W	W	L	W
Jarvis Brook	W	W	W	W	L	W	W	W	W	D	W	D	W	W	W	W	D	W	W	W	D	W	L	L
Rustington	W	D	W	W	W	W	W	W	W	W	D	W	W	W	W	W	W	W	W	W	W	W	W	W
Southwater	D	W	W	W	W	L	D	W	W	D	W	W	W	D	W	L	L	W	L	D	L	D	L	L
St Francis Rangers	L	W	D	D	D	W	L	D	L	W	W	W	L	W	D	L	W	W	D	L	W	D	L	W
TD Shipley	L	W	W	D	L	W	L	D	L	W	W	L	L	L	W	L	W	L	D	W	W	W	W	D
Upper Beeding	D	L	L	W	L	L	W	L	L	L	W	L	L	L	L	L	L	D	L	L	D	L	L	L
Worthing Town	W	L	W	D	L	W	W	D	D	L	W	L	D	W	L	L	W	L	L	L	D	L	L	L

Updated to match(es) played on 19 April 2025. Source: The FA Full-Time SCFL Division 2
W = Win; D = Draw; L = Loss

=== Top scorers ===
Rank	Player	Club	Goals
1	Adam Campbell-Stone	TD Shipley	29
2	Chris Darwin	Rustington	20
3	Jack Newhouse	Rustington	20
4	Liam Edwards	Jarvis Brook	18
5	Ollie Broad	TD Shipley	17

=== Stadia and locations ===
Map showing the location of teams in Division 2

Team	Location	Stadium	Capacity
Bosham	Bosham	Walton Lane	—
Brighton Electricity	Brighton (Withdean)	Withdean Stadium (groundshare with AFC Varndeanians)	8,850
Capel	Capel	Newdigate Road	—
Chichester City B	Chichester	Oaklands Park	2,000
Ferring	Ferring	The Glebelands	—
Hailsham Town	Hailsham	The Beaconsfield	2,000
Jarvis Brook	Crowborough	Limekiln	—
Rustington	Rustington	Rustington Recreation Ground	—
Southwater	Southwater	Southwater Sports Club	—
St Francis Rangers	Haywards Heath	Colwell Ground	1,000
TD Shipley	Shipley (Dragon's Green)	Dragons Green	—
Upper Beeding	Upper Beeding	Memorial Playing Field	—
Worthing Town	Worthing	Palatine Park	—
