= 2025–26 Southern Combination Football League =

The 2025–26 Southern Combination Football League season is the 101st in the history of the competition, which lies at levels 9, 10 and 11 (steps 5 and 6, and county feeder) of the English football league system.

The constitution was announced by The Football Association on 15 May 2025.

== Premier Division ==
The Premier Division comprised 20 clubs from the previous season, 15 of which competed in the previous season

=== Team changes ===
To the Premier Division

Promoted from Division One

- Forest Row
- Seaford Town

Relegated from the Isthmian League South East Division

- Lancing
- Steyning Town

Relegated from the Isthmian League South Central Division

- Guernsey

From the Premier Division

Promoted to the Isthmian League South East Division

- Crowborough Athletic
- Hassocks

Transferred to Wessex Football League Premier Division

- Petersfield Town

Relegated to Division One

- Loxwood
- Saltdean United

=== League table ===
Southern Combination League Premier Division
- Season: 2025–26
- Dates: 9 August 2025 – 25 April 2026
- Country: England
- Teams: 20
- Champions: Steyning Town
- Runner up: Haywards Heath
- Promoted: Steyning Town; Peacehaven & Telscombe
- Relegated: Shoreham
- Matches: 380
- Goals: 1,471 (3.87 per match)
- Average goals/game: 3.87
- Top goalscorer: Sam Murray (Guernsey) (30 goals)
- Biggest home win: Eastbourne United 9–0 Lancing (15 November 2025); Haywards Heath Town 9–0 Shoreham (7 March 2026)
- Biggest away win: Shoreham 0–6 Pagham (1 November 2025); Little Common 0–6 Horsham YM (7 March 2026)
- Highest scoring: Shoreham 6–7 Guernsey (14 October 2025)
- Longest winning run: 17 – Haywards Heath (9 August 2025 – 13 December 2025)
- Longest unbeaten run: 18 – Steyning Town (4 October 2025 – 31 January 2026)
- Longest winless run: 21 – Shoreham (6 September 2025 – 7 February 2026)
- Longest losing run: 20 – Shoreham (6 September 2025 – 31 January 2026)
- Highest attendance: 1553; Guernsey 6–0 Peacehaven & Telscombe (28 March 2026)
- Lowest attendance: 30; Lingfield 0–2 Forest Row (25 August 2025)
- Total attendance: 72,744
- Average attendance: 191
- All statistics correct as of 30 April 2026.

Pos	Team	Pld	W	D	L	GF	GA	GD	Pts	Promotion, qualification or relegation
1	Steyning Town (C, P)	38	30	5	3	119	40	+79	95	Promoted to the Isthmian League South East Division
2	Haywards Heath Town	38	29	2	7	115	39	+76	89	Qualified for the play-offs
3	Guernsey	38	27	0	11	126	77	+49	81	Qualified for the play-offs
4	Horsham YM	38	26	2	10	103	47	+56	80	Qualified for the play-offs
5	Peacehaven & Telscombe (O, P)	38	23	6	9	78	44	+34	75	Qualified for the play-offs
6	Eastbourne United	38	22	6	10	86	37	+49	72	
7	Pagham	38	22	6	10	81	45	+36	72	
8	Newhaven	38	21	3	14	86	82	+4	66	
9	Bexhill United	38	18	4	16	79	76	+3	58	
10	Roffey	38	14	7	17	65	78	−13	49	
11	Seaford Town	38	12	6	20	66	87	−21	42	
12	Crawley Down Gatwick	38	11	8	19	67	82	−15	41	
13	Wick	38	13	5	20	52	82	−30	41 (Note: On 30 January 2026, Wick were deducted 3 points for fielding an ineligible player.)	
14	Forest Row	38	12	4	22	68	94	−26	40	
15	Midhurst & Easebourne	38	9	11	18	54	72	−18	38	
16	Little Common	38	11	5	22	40	78	−38	38	
17	Lingfield	38	10	6	22	62	92	−30	36	
18	AFC Varndeanians	38	8	8	22	38	75	−37	32	
19	Lancing	38	7	3	28	39	108	−69	24	Reprieved from relegation
20	Shoreham (R)	38	5	3	30	47	136	−89	18	Relegated to Division One

Source: SCFL Premier Division Table
Rules for classification: 1) points; 2) goal difference; 3) number of goals scored; 4) number of matches won; 5) head-to-head results
(C) Champions; (O) Play-off winners; (P) Promoted; (R) Relegated

=== Play-offs ===
Semi-finals
2	Haywards Heath Town	0
5	Peacehaven & Telscombe	1
3	Guernsey	3
4	Horsham YM	0

Final
5	Peacehaven & Telscombe	4
3	Guernsey	1

==== Semifinals ====
2 May 2026	Haywards Heath Town	0–1	Peacehaven & Telscombe	Haywards Heath
15:00	Jack Barnes (red card) 36'	Report	Tighe 83'	Stadium: Hanbury Park; Attendance: 767; Referee: Mark Spence (Ireland); Assistant referees: Joshua Plumb (England) Nathaniel Roff (England); Fourth official: Robert King (England)

2 May 2026	Guernsey	3–0	Horsham YM	St. Peter Port
13:30	Fazakerley 39', 65'; Loaring 72'	Report		Stadium: Victoria Park; Attendance: 1,023; Referee: Greig Walker (England); Assistant referees: Neil Sutherland (England) Patrick O'Reilly (Ireland)

==== Final ====
23 May 2026	Guernsey	1–4	Peacehaven & Telscombe	St. Peter Port
13:30	Du Port 72'	Report	Edwards 41', 45+2', 66'; Tighe 50'	Stadium: Victoria Park; Attendance: 1,620; Referee: Harvey Ransome (England); Assistant referees: Daniel Cooper (England) Thomas Murray (England); Fourth official: Tom Strawbridge (Guernsey)

=== Results table ===
Home \ Away	VAR	BEX	CDG	EBU	FOR	GUE	HHT	HYM	LAN	LIN	LCM	MID	NEW	PAG	PAT	ROF	SEA	SHO	STT	WIC
AFC Varndeanians		2–3	0–5	1–2	1–0	0–1	0–1	0–3	2–1	1–0	3–0	0–0	2–2	0–2	1–4	1–5	2–2	2–0	1–2	1–2
Bexhill United	0–0		4–1	2–2	3–2	0–4	1–5	2–1	6–0	5–2	0–2	0–0	1–2	0–4	0–1	0–1	3–1	1–1	1–2	3–0
Crawley Down Gatwick	1–0	1–2		1–1	3–3	2–6	2–3	0–2	3–2	2–2	2–0	2–0	2–2	3–1	3–3	2–3	1–2	4–1	0–1	2–3
Eastbourne United	0–1	8–3	1–0		4–2	3–0	2–0	1–0	9–0	1–0	0–1	0–0	5–3	0–0	3–0	5–0	4–0	7–0	0–1	3–1
Forest Row	4–0	4–1	5–3	1–0		6–2	1–5	0–3	1–2	2–2	3–0	1–1	2–4	1–5	0–2	2–5	1–6	2–1	3–5	0–2
Guernsey	2–1	3–2	7–2	3–0	8–1		3–1	2–3	3–0	4–2	4–1	4–1	7–1	2–4	6–0	8–0	5–3	7–3	3–2	4–1
Haywards Heath Town	5–1	3–4	4–1	1–0	3–0	6–1		3–0	7–0	6–1	3–0	3–0	4–3	2–1	1–0	1–0	4–1	9–0	3–2	4–0
Horsham YM	2–2	6–1	2–3	1–0	3–2	4–0	2–2		1–0	2–0	3–0	1–0	1–2	3–0	1–0	1–2	4–1	10–2	1–6	5–0
Lancing	1–0	2–7	1–2	2–1	0–2	0–2	2–1	1–4		0–2	0–1	2–2	1–3	2–4	0–3	1–1	1–1	5–2	2–7	1–3
Lingfield	2–2	2–1	3–1	1–4	0–2	2–1	3–4	1–2	0–1		1–0	1–4	2–5	1–1	0–5	6–3	2–3	5–0	1–2	0–3
Little Common	4–3	1–2	2–0	0–3	2–2	4–2	1–0	0–6	1–0	1–0		0–2	1–3	1–2	1–2	1–1	2–4	0–2	1–5	1–1
Midhurst & Easebourne	1–3	0–5	0–0	2–2	4–3	3–0	0–4	0–3	2–4	1–1	1–2		0–1	0–3	1–1	5–5	4–0	3–1	1–2	3–0
Newhaven	3–0	1–3	3–1	1–2	3–0	1–5	0–4	3–5	3–0	6–3	1–1	3–0		1–0	1–4	2–1	1–3	3–2	2–3	4–0
Pagham	2–0	1–0	2–2	2–4	0–1	5–0	1–2	1–5	6–0	3–0	3–1	2–1	2–1		2–2	2–1	2–0	3–1	2–2	1–0
Peacehaven & Telscombe	2–1	1–2	3–1	0–1	2–1	0–1	2–1	3–2	3–0	5–1	2–1	2–1	4–1	2–1		2–2	5–0	2–0	1–1	5–1
Roffey	1–1	4–2	0–2	2–1	4–0	2–3	2–1	3–2	3–0	0–2	2–0	0–4	1–2	1–2	0–2		0–2	2–1	1–1	0–0
Seaford Town	6–0	0–2	2–4	0–0	2–1	0–1	1–3	0–4	4–2	2–2	3–3	1–2	1–2	2–1	0–0	5–1		1–4	0–2	1–3
Shoreham	1–3	1–4	2–0	0–4	1–3	6–7	0–4	0–2	1–0	3–4	1–2	3–3	1–3	0–6	2–0	0–5	1–5		0–5	1–4
Steyning Town	3–0	3–0	3–2	3–0	2–0	1–2	1–1	3–1	4–3	3–2	4–0	4–1	7–1	1–1	2–0	4–1	5–0	4–0		8–0
Wick	0–0	2–3	1–1	2–3	0–4	4–3	0–1	1–2	1–0	1–3	2–1	3–1	1–3	0–1	1–3	2–0	3–1	2–2	2–3	

Legend: Blue = home team win; Yellow = draw; Red = away team win.

=== Results by matchday ===
Matchday	1	2	3	4	5	6	7	8	9	10	11	12	13	14	15	16	17	18	19	20	21	22	23	24	25	26	27	28	29	30	31	32	33	34	35	36	37	38
AFC Varndeanians	D	L	L	W	L	L	L	W	L	L	L	L	L	L	L	L	L	L	D	D	D	W	L	L	L	L	W	D	L	D	D	W	L	W	W	W	D	L
Bexhill United	D	W	W	W	W	L	L	D	W	W	L	W	L	L	W	L	W	W	D	L	W	L	W	L	W	L	L	W	W	L	L	D	W	L	W	W	L	L
Crawley Down Gatwick	L	D	D	L	L	W	L	L	L	W	W	W	L	L	L	L	L	L	L	D	L	L	L	W	D	D	W	W	L	D	L	D	W	W	L	W	D	W
Eastbourne United Association	L	L	D	L	W	L	L	D	D	W	L	W	W	L	W	W	W	W	W	D	W	L	W	W	W	D	W	W	W	W	L	W	D	W	W	L	W	W
Forest Row	W	W	W	W	L	W	W	W	D	W	W	L	L	L	L	W	L	L	D	L	W	W	L	L	L	L	L	L	D	L	D	L	L	L	L	L	L	L
Guernsey	W	W	W	L	W	L	W	W	L	W	W	L	L	W	W	W	W	W	L	W	W	W	W	W	W	W	L	W	W	W	L	W	W	W	L	L	L	W
Haywards Heath Town	W	W	W	W	W	W	W	W	W	W	W	W	W	W	W	W	W	L	W	W	D	W	D	W	L	L	W	L	W	W	W	W	L	L	W	W	W	L
Horsham YM	W	W	W	L	W	W	W	L	W	L	L	W	W	W	W	W	D	L	W	L	D	W	W	W	W	W	W	L	W	W	W	W	L	W	L	L	W	W
Lancing	L	L	L	D	L	L	L	L	L	W	L	L	W	L	L	L	W	D	W	D	L	L	L	L	L	L	L	L	L	W	L	L	W	L	L	W	L	L
Lingfield	D	L	D	L	L	L	W	L	L	L	W	L	L	W	L	L	L	D	L	W	L	L	W	L	L	D	L	D	W	D	L	L	W	L	W	L	W	W
Little Common	L	L	L	W	W	W	L	L	D	W	L	L	L	W	W	L	L	L	L	W	W	D	D	D	L	L	W	L	L	D	L	L	W	W	L	L	L	L
Midhurst & Easebourne	D	L	L	L	D	L	W	L	W	W	D	L	D	L	L	L	L	L	L	L	D	W	D	D	W	D	D	D	L	L	L	D	W	L	L	W	W	W
Newhaven	W	D	W	W	W	W	W	L	L	W	L	L	L	W	W	W	L	W	W	D	W	L	D	W	L	W	L	W	L	W	L	W	W	W	L	W	L	L
Pagham	W	D	W	L	W	L	W	D	W	W	W	L	W	W	L	L	D	W	D	W	D	W	W	W	L	D	L	W	L	W	W	L	W	L	W	L	W	W
Peacehaven & Telscombe	D	W	L	L	W	W	L	D	W	W	W	W	W	W	W	L	L	D	W	W	W	W	W	W	W	W	W	W	D	D	W	D	L	L	W	W	L	D
Roffey	L	W	L	W	W	W	D	W	L	D	L	D	W	L	D	W	L	W	W	D	W	L	L	L	L	L	W	W	D	L	L	L	L	L	W	L	W	D
Seaford Town	L	L	D	L	L	L	W	W	L	L	W	L	W	W	W	L	W	W	D	L	L	D	D	L	L	W	W	L	D	L	W	W	L	L	L	L	D	L
Shoreham	W	W	L	W	L	L	L	L	L	L	L	L	L	L	L	L	L	L	L	L	L	L	L	L	D	W	L	W	L	L	L	D	L	D	L	L	L	L
Steyning Town	W	D	W	W	D	W	L	D	W	W	W	W	W	W	W	W	W	W	W	W	D	D	W	W	W	L	W	W	W	W	W	W	W	W	L	W	W	W
Wick	L	L	L	L	L	L	W	L	W	W	L	L	W	L	D	W	W	L	L	L	W	L	L	W	D	L	L	L	L	D	W	W	L	D	W	W	D	W

Updated to match(es) played on 25 April 2026. Source:
W = Win; D = Draw; L = Loss

=== Top scorers ===
Rank	Player	Club	Goals
1	(England) Sam Murray	Guernsey	30
2	(England) Stan Bridgman	Steyning Town	26
2	(England) Richard Pingling	Horsham YM	26
4	(England) Dion Jarvis	Steyning Town	24
5	(England) Lee Robinson	Newhaven	23
6	(England) Mark Goldson	Haywards Heath Town	21
6	(England) Jack Shonk	Bexhill United	21
6	(Wales) Connor Tighe	Peacehaven & Telscombe	21
9	(England) David Crouch	Wick _{(Previously Pagham)}	20
10	(England) Charlie Ball	Eastbourne United	19

=== Stadia and locations ===
Location of teams in the 2025–26 Premier Division

Team	Location	Stadium	Capacity
AFC Varndeanians	Brighton (Withdean)	Withdean Stadium	8,850
Bexhill United	Bexhill-on-Sea	The Polegrove	1,000
Crawley Down Gatwick	Crawley Down	The Haven Centre	1,000
Eastbourne United Association	Eastbourne	The Oval	1,200
Forest Row	Crawley (Three Bridges)	Jubilee Field (groundshare with Three Bridges)	1,500
Guernsey	Saint Sampson	Victoria Park	5,000
Haywards Heath Town	Haywards Heath	Hanbury Park	2,000
Horsham YM	Horsham	Gorings Mead	1,575
Lancing	Lancing	Culver Road	1,500
Lingfield	Lingfield	The Sports Pavilion	2,000
Little Common	Bexhill-on-Sea (Little Common)	Little Common Recreation Ground	1,200
Midhurst & Easebourne	Easebourne	Rotherfield	1,000
Newhaven	Newhaven	The Trafalgar Ground	3,000
Pagham	Pagham	Nyetimber Lane	1,500
Peacehaven & Telscombe	Peacehaven	The Sports Park	3,000
Roffey	Horsham (Roffey)	Bartholomew Way	1,000
Seaford Town	Seaford	The Crouch	—
Shoreham	Shoreham-by-Sea	Middle Road	2,000
Steyning Town	Steyning	The Shooting Field	2,000
Wick	Littlehampton (Wick)	Crabtree Park	2,000

== Division One ==
Division One decreased from 20 clubs to 18, 11 of which competed from the previous season. Copthorne were reprieved from relegation

=== Team changes ===
To Division One

Promoted from Division Two

- Jarvis Brook

Promoted from Mid-Sussex League

- Ringmer

Promoted from Surrey Premier County Football League

- AFC Walcountians

Relegated from the Premier Division

- Loxwood
- Saltdean United

From Division One

Promoted to the Premier Division

- Forest Row
- Seaford Town

Transferred to Southern Counties East

- Banstead Athletic
- Chessington & Hook

Relegated to Division Two

- Alfold
- Storrington Community

Demoted to Mid-Sussex League Division Three South:

- Montpelier Villa

=== League table ===
Southern Combination League Division One
- Season: 2025–26
- Champions: Godalming Town
- Promoted: Godalming Town; Billingshurst
- Relegated: AFC Uckfield Town; Copthorne
- Matches: 306
- Goals: 1,157 (3.78 per match)
- Average goals/game: 3.78
- Top goalscorer: Max Davies (22 Goals)
- Biggest home win: Selsey 20–0 Copthorne (25 April 2026)
- Biggest away win: AFC Uckfield Town 0–9 Reigate Priory (13 September 2025)
- Highest scoring: Selsey 20–0 Copthorne (25 April 2026)
- Longest winning run: 8 – Reigate Priory (10 March 2026 – 14 April 2026)
- Longest unbeaten run: 11 – Godalming Town (9 August 2025 – 8 November 2025)
- Longest losing run: 26 – Copthorne (27 September 2025 – 25 April 2026)
- Lowest attendance: 10; Copthorne 1–4 Jarvis Brook (7 March 2026)

Pos	Team	Pld	W	D	L	GF	GA	GD	Pts	Promotion, qualification or relegation
1	Godalming Town (C, P)	34	20	10	4	62	30	+32	70	Promoted to the Combined Counties League Premier Division South
2	Reigate Priory	34	21	2	11	92	41	+51	65	Qualified for the play-offs
3	Billingshurst (Note: Billingshurst v Copthorne (18 April 2026) match not played, walkover win awarded to Billingshurst) (O, P)	34	19	7	8	94	52	+42	64	Qualified for the play-offs
4	Worthing United	34	19	7	8	72	37	+35	64	Qualified for the play-offs
5	Infinity	34	19	6	9	86	51	+35	63	Qualified for the play-offs
6	AFC Walcountians	34	18	6	10	89	51	+38	60	
7	Arundel	34	18	6	10	80	63	+17	60	
8	Selsey	34	14	10	10	73	55	+18	52	
9	Jarvis Brook	34	13	10	11	56	53	+3	49	
10	Mile Oak	34	14	4	16	48	55	−7	46	
11	Saltdean United	34	12	7	15	66	57	+9	43	
12	East Preston	34	10	11	13	57	64	−7	41	
13	Dorking Wanderers B	34	10	9	15	56	57	−1	39	
14	Oakwood	34	9	10	15	54	67	−13	37	
15	Ringmer	34	11	7	16	52	72	−20	37 (Note: Ringmer were deducted three points for fielding an ineligible player.)	
16	Loxwood	34	9	7	18	45	69	−24	34	Reprieved from relegation
17	AFC Uckfield Town (R)	34	4	11	19	42	105	−63	23	Relegated to the Mid Sussex League Premier Division
18	Copthorne (R)	34	1	0	33	33	178	−145	3	Relegated to Division Two

Source: SCFL Division One League Table
Rules for classification: 1) points; 2) goal difference; 3) number of goals scored; 4) number of matches won; 5) head-to-head results
(C) Champions; (O) Play-off winners; (P) Promoted; (R) Relegated

=== Play-offs ===
Semi-finals
2	Reigate Priory	0
5	Infinity	2
3	Billingshurst	2
4	Worthing United	0

Final
3	Billingshurst	2
5	Infinity	1

==== Semifinals ====
28 April 2026	Reigate Priory	0–2	Infinity	Horley
19:30		Report		Stadium: Anderson Way; Attendance: 174; Referee: David Stappleton (England); Assistant referees: Nathan George (England) Owen Radley (England); Fourth official: Oliver Westgate (England)

28 April 2026	Billingshurst	2–0	Worthing United	Billingshurst
19:45		Report		Stadium: Jubilee Fields; Attendance: 297; Referee: Steven Fogden (England); Assistant referees: Jamie Wells (England) Adan Siage (England); Fourth official: Daniel Killick (England)

==== Final ====
2 May 2026	Billingshurst	2–1	Infinity	Billingshurst
15:00	Brodie; Hards	Report		Stadium: Jubilee Fields; Attendance: 401; Referee: Tom Strawbridge (Guernsey); Assistant referees: Wayne Pocock (England) Hassan Rajwani (England); Fourth official: Matthew Dyson (England)

=== Results table ===
Home \ Away	UCK	WAL	ARU	BIL	COP	DOR	EPR	GOD	INF	JAR	LOX	MOK	OAK	REI	RIN	SDU	SEL	WOR
AFC Uckfield Town		0–0	2–2	0–4	2–1	1–2	2–2	0–3	3–3	0–2	2–2	1–0	1–3	0–9	1–2	1–1	0–1	3–3
AFC Walcountians	2–1		2–1	3–4	1–0	2–1	6–1	0–2	2–5	0–0	3–0	6–2	3–0	5–4	6–2	6–0	6–3	0–1
Arundel	2–1	1–5		3–2	8–0	1–2	1–0	0–2	1–4	2–3	1–0	4–2	2–4	2–0	4–2	2–1	4–2	2–0
Billingshurst	5–0	3–0	6–1		H/W (Note: Billingshurst v Copthorne (18 April 2026) match not played, home walkover win awarded to Billingshurst)	3–0	8–2	1–1	3–4	2–2	3–1	3–0	3–3	2–6	4–0	5–2	1–2	0–1
Copthorne	3–6	1–7	2–6	1–8		0–6	1–3	0–5	0–9	1–4	0–5	1–4	4–1	0–4	1–3	1–2	4–6	1–4
Dorking Wanderers B	3–0	2–0	0–2	4–4	10–2		2–2	1–1	0–3	5–1	0–1	2–2	2–0	2–2	0–1	1–0	2–3	0–4
East Preston	2–2	2–1	2–2	5–0	4–1	0–0		0–1	1–2	1–2	1–2	2–1	1–1	2–1	2–1	3–3	1–3	1–1
Godalming Town	4–0	0–0	1–1	2–0	3–2	1–0	3–2		0–3	0–3	2–1	0–2	2–0	1–0	0–0	2–0	0–0	4–1
Infinity	3–3	2–4	4–1	3–3	7–0	3–1	1–2	1–1		4–0	3–2	1–0	4–2	1–3	0–3	3–2	1–2	1–1
Jarvis Brook	1–1	1–1	1–4	0–3	2–1	2–0	2–0	2–2	1–2		4–0	2–2	1–1	1–3	1–1	0–2	0–2	1–0
Loxwood	7–0	1–7	1–5	0–0	4–2	2–1	1–0	0–1	1–3	1–1		1–3	4–2	2–2	3–2	0–3	1–1	0–3
Mile Oak	3–0	0–4	2–2	0–4	2–0	1–2	0–2	2–1	3–1	3–2	2–0		0–1	2–1	2–0	2–1	0–0	0–2
Oakwood	4–6	1–1	2–2	1–0	7–0	2–0	2–3	1–1	2–2	3–2	2–2	0–2		0–1	1–0	1–0	2–4	2–2
Reigate Priory	9–1	3–2	2–3	0–2	11–0	3–0	1–0	2–3	1–0	2–1	4–0	2–0	1–0		2–0	2–1	3–0	2–1
Ringmer	3–0	1–3	1–3	1–1	4–1	3–3	3–3	0–1	2–1	0–2	2–0	4–2	3–2	0–3		1–4	2–1	1–5
Saltdean United	8–0	1–1	3–2	2–3	7–1	1–1	3–1	2–3	0–1	2–2	3–0	0–2	2–0	3–1	1–1		0–2	1–3
Selsey	2–2	4–0	1–2	0–1	20–0	1–1	2–2	0–6	1–0	1–5	0–0	2–0	1–1	1–0	2–2	3–3		0–2
Worthing United	4–0	1–0	1–1	2–3	3–1	3–0	2–2	3–3	0–1	1–2	1–0	1–0	5–0	3–2	7–1	0–2	1–0	

Legend: Blue = home team win; Yellow = draw; Red = away team win.

=== Top Scorers ===
As of 28 February 2026

Rank	Player	Club	Goals
1	(England) Max Davies	Selsey	22
1	(Trinidad and Tobago) Zion Mcleod	East Preston	22
3	(Netherlands) Tayo Adekoya	Godalming Town _{(Formerly Selsey)}	18
3	(England) Chike Ejezie	AFC Walcountians	18
3	(England) Mark Soares	Godalming Town	18
6	(England) Tom Edwards	Billingshurst	17
6	(England) William Street	Reigate Priory	17
6	(England) Thomas Tierney	Infinity	17
6	(England) Marley Amber	Saltdean United _{(Formerly Mile Oak)}	17
10	(England) Matthew Hards	Billingshurst	16
10	(Scotland) Lee Peacock	Reigate Priory	16
10	(England) Jacob Sewell	AFC Walcountians	16

=== Stadia and locations ===
Location of teams in the 2025–26 Division 1

Team	Location	Stadium	Capacity
AFC Uckfield Town	Framfield	The Oaks	600
AFC Walcountians	Woodmansterne	Walcountians Sports Club	
Arundel	Arundel	Mill Road	2,200
Billingshurst	Billingshurst	Jubilee Fields	—
Copthorne	Copthorne	Camping World Community Stadium (groundshare with Horsham)	1,300
Dorking Wanderers B	Dorking	Meadowbank	3,000
East Preston	Littlehampton (East Preston)	The Lashmar	1,000
Godalming Town	Godalming	Bill Kyte Stadium	3,000
Infinity	Sidlesham	Sidlesham Recreation Ground	—
Jarvis Brook	Jarvis Brook	Jarvis Brook Sports Club	—
Loxwood	Loxwood	Plaistow Road	1,000
Mile Oak	Brighton (Mile Oak)	Mile Oak Recreation Ground	—
Oakwood	Crawley (Three Bridges)	Tinsley Lane	—
Reigate Priory	Reigate	Park Lane	—
Ringmer	Ringmer	King's Academy Ringmer	—
Saltdean United	Brighton (Saltdean)	Hill Park	1,000
Selsey	Selsey	Bunn Leisure Stadium	—
Worthing United	Worthing (Broadwater)	The Robert Albon Memorial Ground	1,504

== Division Two ==
Division Two increased to 15 teams after Jarvis Brook were promoted to Division One, and Alfold, Montpelier Villa and Storrington were relegated from Division One. Montpelier Villa resigned from the league, whilst Rudgwick joined from the West Sussex Football League.

=== Team changes ===
Relegated from Division One

- Alfold
- Storrington

Promoted from West Sussex Football League Premier Division

- Rudgwick

St Francis Rangers were renamed to ASC Brighton Rangers, following a merger with ASC Strikers.

From Division Two

Promoted to Division One

- Jarvis Brook

Left League

- Montpelier Villa

=== League table ===
Southern Combination League Division Two
- Season: 2025–26
- Champions: Hailsham Town
- Matches: 210
- Goals: 935 (4.45 per match)

Promotion from this division is dependant on ground grading as well as league position.

Pos	Team	Pld	W	D	L	GF	GA	GD	Pts	Promotion, qualification or relegation
1	Hailsham Town (Note: Hailsham Town v Southwater (18 April 2026) match not played, walkover win awarded to Hailsham Town) (Note: Away match versus Capel (who withdrew from the league in April 2026) awarded as an away walkover win) (C, P)	28	25	2	1	107	18	+89	77	Promoted to Division One
2	Rustington	28	22	4	2	105	27	+78	70	
3	TD Shipley (Note: Home match versus Capel (who withdrew from the league in April 2026) awarded as a home walkover win)	28	21	3	4	73	35	+38	66	
4	Chichester City B	28	19	5	4	107	26	+81	62	
5	Southwater	28	13	8	7	67	38	+29	47	
6	Ferring	28	14	1	13	68	62	+6	43	
7	Upper Beeding	28	12	6	10	56	58	−2	42	
8	Alfold	28	12	5	11	71	58	+13	41	
9	ASC Brighton Rangers	28	10	4	14	74	65	+9	34	
10	Storrington	28	7	6	15	41	91	−50	27	
11	Capel (Note: Capel withdrew from the league in April 2026, their seven unplayed matches (four home and three away fixtures) were awarded as wins to their opponents)	28	8	1	19	42	66	−24	25	Withdrew from league April 2026; relegated to West Sussex Football League Premier Division
12	Brighton Electricity	28	5	5	18	34	103	−69	20	
13	Rudgwick	28	4	4	20	35	86	−51	16	
14	Bosham	28	3	5	20	21	80	−59	14	
15	Worthing Town	28	3	5	20	34	122	−88	14	

Source: The FA Full-Time SCFL Division 2 Table
Rules for classification: 1) points; 2) goal difference; 3) number of goals scored.
(C) Champions; (P) Promoted

=== Results table ===
Home \ Away	ALF	ABR	BOS	BRE	CAP	CCB	FER	HAI	RUD	RUS	SOU	STO	TDS	UBD	WOT
Alfold		4–2	2–0	7–0	2–1	0–3	1–4	1–4	6–1	2–5	2–3	5–3	2–2	3–1	8–1
ASC Brighton Rangers	5–1		2–0	6–0	5–4	3–4	0–4	0–3	6–2	1–4	0–2	8–0	3–3	4–2	8–1
Bosham	1–1	1–2		0–2	0–5	0–5	1–5	1–8	2–4	0–2	1–1	2–1	1–2	1–1	0–0
Brighton Electricity	2–2	3–2	1–1		H/W (Note: Match not played (Capel withdrew from league in April 2026); home walkover win awarded)	1–4	0–3	0–5	4–3	0–5	1–1	3–3	2–4	1–3	1–3
Capel	1–4	3–0	A/W (Note: Match not played (Capel withdrew from league in April 2026); away walkover win awarded)	2–1		0–4	A/W	A/W	4–1	1–3	0–2	6–2	A/W	2–4	2–1
Chichester City B	1–1	3–1	2–0	12–0	8–0		2–1	0–2	10–0	1–1	2–1	7–0	2–2	6–0	7–0
Ferring	4–5	3–2	3–2	4–0	4–1	0–2		2–6	2–2	1–7	4–2	1–3	2–3	2–0	4–2
Hailsham Town	4–0	1–3	4–0	2–0	7–1	2–1	2–0		7–0	3–1	H/W (Note: Hailsham Town v Southwater (18 April 2026) match not played, home walkover win awarded to Hailsham Town)	4–0	2–0	2–0	9–0
Rudgwick	0–1	2–2	3–1	4–1	0–3	0–8	3–1	1–2		0–2	0–1	0–1	2–3	2–2	1–1
Rustington	2–1	2–1	4–2	7–0	9–0	2–1	7–3	2–2	3–1		3–3	7–1	2–0	2–1	2–0
Southwater	3–0	2–0	8–0	2–2	5–0	3–3	4–2	1–2	4–2	1–1		2–2	1–2	3–1	2–0
Storrington	2–2	3–3	2–0	5–1	H/W	1–3	0–3	1–8	1–0	0–6	1–1		1–5	1–4	2–2
TD Shipley	1–0	2–0	6–0	8–0	H/W	2–0	1–0	1–3	2–1	1–0	4–1	2–3		2–1	4–2
Upper Beeding	1–0	3–2	2–1	4–2	2–2	2–2	3–2	2–2	5–0	0–6	2–1	2–1	2–4		4–0
Worthing Town	1–8	3–3	2–3	1–6	2–4	1–4	1–4	0–11	1–0	0–8	1–7	4–1	2–7	2–2	

Source: SCFL Fixtures and Results
Legend: Blue = home team win; Yellow = draw; Red = away team win.

=== Top Scorers ===
As of 04 May 2026

Rank	Player	Club	Goals
1	Adam Campbell-Stone	TD Shipley	33
2	Antoine Sharpe	ASC Brighton Rangers	27
3	Josh Hall	Chichester City B	26
4	Matthew Wilson	Rustington	22
5	Joe Sadler	Ferring	19
6	Jack Newhouse	Rustington	18
7	Joshua Castle	Chichester City B	17
8	Dieron Munorrah	Alfold	16
9	Zain Beg	Southwater	15
9	Kieran Dowell	Chichester City B	15
9	Luke Longhurst	Capel	15

=== Stadia and locations ===
Location of teams in the 2025–26 Division 2

Team	Location	Stadium	Capacity
Alfold	Alfold Crossways	Alfold Recreation Ground	1,000
Bosham	Bosham	Walton Lane	—
Brighton Electricity	Brighton (Withdean)	Withdean Stadium (groundshare with AFC Varndeanians)	8,850
Capel	Capel	Newdigate Road	—
Chichester City B	Chichester	Oaklands Park	2,000
Ferring	Ferring	The Glebelands	—
Hailsham Town	Hailsham	The Beaconsfield	2,000
Rudgwick	Rudgwick	King George V Playing Fields	—
Rustington	Rustington	Rustington Recreation Ground	—
ASC Brighton Rangers	Lancing	Culver Road (groundshare with Lancing)	1,500
Southwater	Southwater	Southwater Sports Club	—
Storrington Community	Storrington	The Recreation Ground, Storrington	—
TD Shipley	Shipley (Dragon's Green)	Dragons Green	—
Upper Beeding	Upper Beeding	Memorial Playing Field	—
Worthing Town	Worthing	Palatine Park	—
