= Steve Perkins =

Steve Perkins may refer to:

- Stephen Perkins (born 1967), American musician and songwriter
- Steve Perkins (footballer) (born 1954), English footballer
- Stephen W. Perkins (1809–?), American politician in Texas
