= Joel Etienne-Clark =

Footballer (born 1986)

Personal information
- Date of birth: 10 October 1986 (age 40)
- Place of birth: Chelmsford, England
- Height: 1.80 m (5 ft 11 in)
- Position: Midfielder

Youth career
- –2004: Leyton Orient
- 2004: Chelmsford City

Senior career*
Years	Team	Apps	(Gls)
2004–2005	Chelmsford City	5	(0)
2005	→ Great Wakering Rovers (loan)		
2005–2007	Great Wakering Rovers	97	(8)
2007–2008	Waltham Forest	18	(3)
2008	Chelmsford City		
2008	Dartford		
2008–2009	Great Wakering Rovers	7	(1)
2009	Maldon Town		
2009–2010	Leyton		
2010–2011	Tilbury		
2011–2012	Lingfield		
2012–2013	Ilford		

International career
2008–2014	Dominica	6	(0)
- * Club domestic league appearances and goals

Joel Etienne-Clark (born 10 October 1986) is former footballer who played as a midfielder. Born in England, he represented the Dominica national team internationally.

== Club career ==
Born in Chelmsford, Etienne-Clark began his career in the academy at Leyton Orient, before leaving to sign for hometown club Chelmsford City in 2004, making his debut in a 3–0 win against Slough Town on 23 October 2004, after progressing from Chelmsford's youth ranks. Etienne-Clark spent the remainder of the 2004–05 season out on loan to Great Wakering Rovers. Ahead of the 2005–06 season, Etienne-Clark joined Great Wakering in a permanent basis, making 97 league appearances over the course of two years, scoring eight times. In 2007, Etienne-Clark signed for Waltham Forest, scoring three times in 18 appearances, before re-signing for Chelmsford the following year. In October 2008, following a short spell with Dartford, he rejoined Great Wakering Rovers, making his 100th appearance at the club in the process. In 2009, Etienne-Clark briefly joined Maldon Town, before signing for Leyton later that year. In 2010, Tilbury signed Etienne-Clark, before the midfielder joined Lingfield the following season. In 2012, Etienne-Clark signed for Ilford.

== International career ==
Etienne-Clark made his debut for Dominica in a March 2008 FIFA World Cup qualification match against Barbados. In total, Etienne-Clark made six appearances for Dominica.

== Style of play ==
Upon signing for Tilbury in August 2010, Tilbury manager Paul Vaughan described Etienne-Clark as a player with "pace and ability", who can "play wide or in behind the front two".
