= Forest Row F.C. =

Association football club in England

Coordinates: 51°06′55.12″N 0°10′03.88″W

Forest Row
- Full name: Forest Row Football Club
- Nickname: Frow
- Founded: 1892
- Ground: Jubilee Field, Three Bridges
- Chairman: Elliott Benton
- Manager: Ian Nicholls
- League: Southern Combination Premier Division
- 2025–26: Southern Combination Premier Division, 14th of 20
Home colours	Away colours

Forest Row Football Club is a football club based in Forest Row in East Sussex, England. They are currently members of the Southern Combination Premier Division and play at Jubilee Field in Three Bridges.

== History ==
The club was established in 1892. Becoming members of the Mid-Sussex League, they were joint Division Two champions in 1951–52. After winning Division Four in 1959–60, the club were champions of an emergency Division Three competition in the weather-interrupted 1962–63 season. They were Division Three champions again in 1971–72 and won the Mowatt Cup the following season. In 1975–76 the club won the Division One and Mowatt Cup double. They won the Mowatt Cup for a third time in 1983–84 and the League Trophy in 1987–88.

After winning the Sommerville Cup in 1999–2000, another rise up the divisions began in 2000–01 when the club were Division Four champions. They finished third in Division Three in 2002–03, earning promotion to Division Two. The following season they were Division Two runners-up and were promoted to Division One. After a third-place finish in Division One in 2005–06, the club were promoted to the Premier Division. In 2010–11 they finished bottom of the Premier Division and were relegated to the renamed Championship division. They went on to finish bottom of the Championship the following season, and were relegated to Division One.

The club were promoted back to the Championship in 2013–14 and were Championship runners-up in 2014–15, earning promotion back to the Premier Division. After a fourth-place finish in the curtailed 2020–21 season, the club were promoted to Division One of the Southern Combination League. In 2024–25 they were runners-up in Division One, qualifying for the promotion play-offs. After beating Arundel on penalties in the semi-finals, the club defeated Infinity 1–0 in the final to earn promotion to the Premier Division.

== Ground ==
Following promotion to the Southern Combination in 2021 the club played home games at Oakwood's Tinsley Lane ground in Crawley, until relocating to East Grinstead Town's East Court ground in East Grinstead in 2024. After further promotion to the Southern Combination Football League Premier Division Forest Row relocated to groundshare with Three Bridges at Jubilee Field.

== Honours ==
- Mid-Sussex League
  - Division One champions 1975–76
  - Division Two champions 1951–52 (joint), 1971–72
  - Division Three champions 1962–63, 1971–72
  - Division Four champions 1959–60, 2000–01
  - League Trophy 1987–88
  - Mowatt Cup winners 1972–73, 1975–76, 1983–84
  - Sommerville Cup winners 1999–2000

== Records ==
- Best FA Cup performance: Extra preliminary round, 2025–26
- Best FA Vase performance: First round, 2026–27
