= Steve Perkins (footballer) =

English footballer and manager

Personal information
- Full name: Stephen Arthur Perkins
- Date of birth: 3 October 1954 (age 72)
- Place of birth: Stepney, England
- Height: 5 ft 11 in (1.80 m)
- Position: Left back

Senior career*
Years	Team	Apps	(Gls)
1971–1977	Chelsea	0	(0)
1977–1978	Queens Park Rangers	0	(0)
1978–1980	Wimbledon	52	(0)
1980–1986	Wealdstone	195	(2)
Total		247	(2)

Managerial career
- 2010: Lingfield
- * Club domestic league appearances and goals

Stephen Arthur Perkins (born 3 October 1954 in Stepney, Greater London) is an English former professional footballer who played in the Football League, as a left back.

Perkins was the manager of Lingfield in the Sussex County League, during the second half of the 2009–10 campaign.
