= AFC Walcountians =

Association football club in England

Coordinates: 51°19′44″N -0°10′08″E

- Full name: AFC Walcountians
- Nickname: The Counts
- Founded: 1997; 29 years ago (as Epsom Dynamos FC)
- Ground: Walcountians Sports Club, Woodmansterne
- Chairman: Paul Marsh
- Manager: Matt Scola
- League: Southern Combination Division One
- 2025–26: Southern Combination Division One, 6th of 18

AFC Walcountians is a football club based in Woodmansterne in Surrey, England. They are currently members of the Southern Combination Division One and play at Walcountians Sports Club.

== History ==
The club was formed in 1997 as Epsom Dynamos, but later became fully incorporated as part of Walcountians Sports Club and became known as AFC Walcountians in 2004.

Being dedicated to youth football, the club launched its first senior side for the 2015–16 season in the Redhill & District League Division One. In 2017 the club joined the Surrey South Eastern Combination Junior Division One and won the league in the first season. In the 2020–21 season the club won the Intermediate Division One and earned promotion into the Surrey Premier County League

In 2025 the club were promoted into the Southern Combination Football League Division One for the 2025–26 season.

== Ground ==
The club play their home games at Walcountians Sports Club, Carshalton Road, Woodmansterne, SM7 3HU

== Honours ==
- Surrey South Eastern Combination
  - Intermediate Division One Champions: 2020–2021
  - Junior Division One Champions: 2017–2018
- Southern Combination Football League
  - Division One Challenge Cup Winners: 2025–2026

== Records ==
- FA Vase
  - Second Qualifying Round 2026–27
