= Dragon's Green =

Hamlet in West Sussex, England

Coordinates: 50.99696°N 0.37266°W

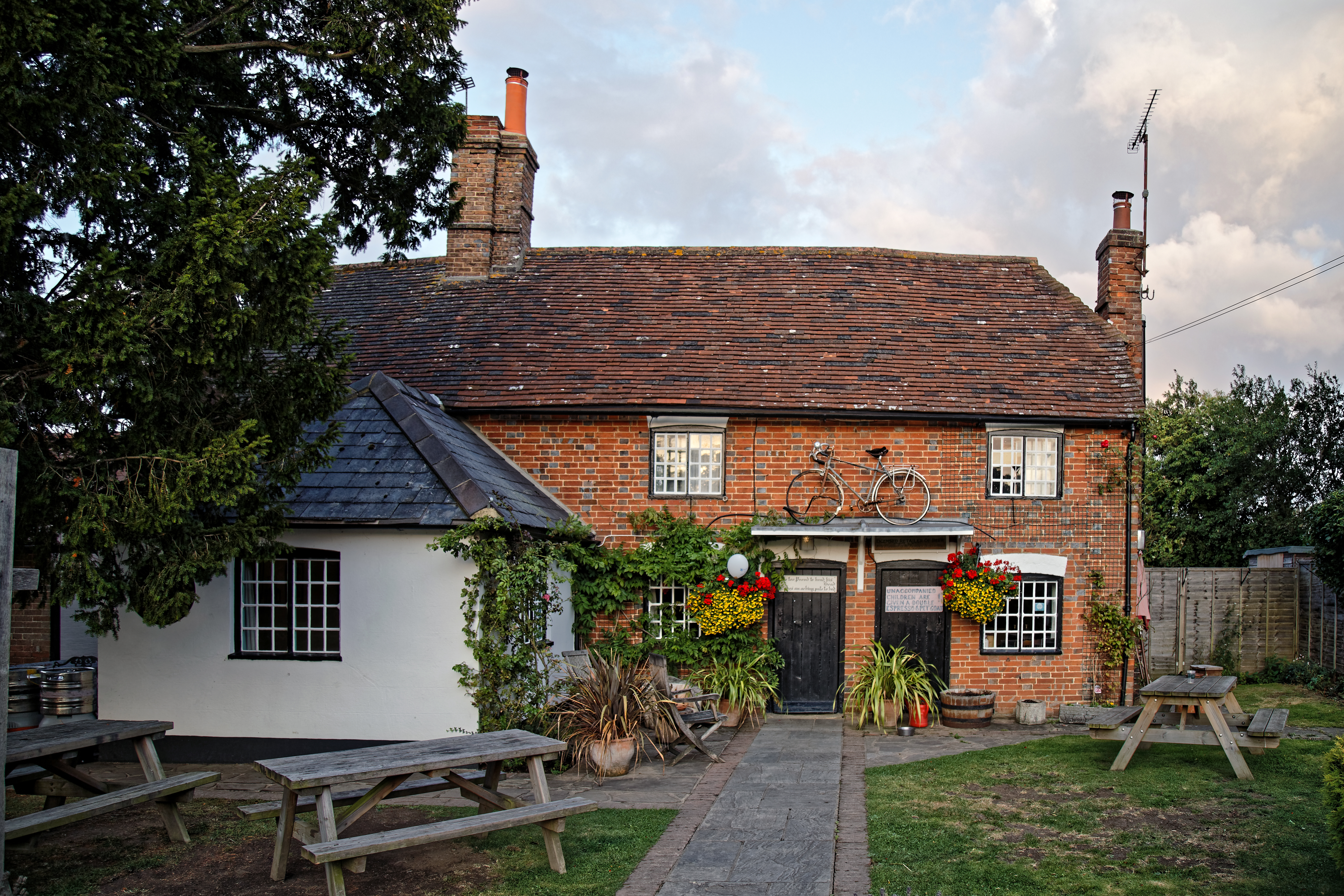
- The George and Dragon

- Location within West Sussex
- OS grid reference: TQ142232
- Civil parish: Shipley
- District: Horsham
- Shire county: West Sussex
- Region: South East
- Country: England
- Sovereign state: United Kingdom
- Police: Sussex
- Fire: West Sussex
- Ambulance: South East Coast
- UK Parliament: Horsham

Dragon's Green is a hamlet in the civil parish of Shipley, and the Horsham district of West Sussex, England.

The hamlet is 5 miles (8 km) south from the market and district town of Horsham, and just north from the A272 road which runs locally from the large village of Billingshurst to the town of Haywards Heath. The parish village of Shipley is just under 1 mile (1.6 km) to the south. The hamlet is centered on the George and Dragon public house.
