= Infinity F.C. =

Coordinates: 50°57′33″N 1°22′49″W

Infinity
- Full name: Infinity Football Club
- Founded: 2006; 20 years ago
- Ground: Sidlesham Recreation Ground
- Chairman: Thomas Bone
- Manager: Vacant
- League: Southern Combination Division One
- 2024–25: Southern Combination Division One, 5th of 20
Home colours

Infinity Football Club is a football club currently based in Sidlesham, West Sussex. The club compete in Southern Combination Division One.

== History ==
Founded in 2006, Infinity joined the Winchester & District League, before joining the Hampshire League 2004 in 2009, finishing runners-up in 2011. Following the Hampshire League 2004 dissolving in 2013, Infinity joined the Hampshire Premier League Division One. In 2015, the club won Division One, gaining promotion to the Senior Division. In 2019, the club finished as runners up in the Senior Division. In 2021, the club was admitted into the Wessex League Division One. On 6 February 2022, Infinity withdrew from the Wessex League, following the termination of their groundsharing agreement with Hythe & Dibden. Ahead of the following season, the club relocated to Sidlesham to play at the local recreation ground and restarted life back in the Hampshire Premier League Division One.

== Ground ==
Upon formation, Infinity played in Winchester, before relocation to Southampton. Infinity later moved to Knowle, before moving to Hythe in 2020 to groundshare with Hythe & Dibden at their Clayfields ground. In 2022, they relocated to Sidlesham.

== Records ==
- Best FA Vase performance: Second round, 2025–26
