= Lingfield F.C. =

Association football club in England

Lingfield
- Full name: Lingfield Football Club
- Nickname: The Lingers
- Founded: 1893
- Ground: Church Road, Whyteleafe, Surrey
- Capacity: 2,000
- Coordinates: 51°18′17″N 0°4′47″W
- Chairman: Richard Williams
- Manager: Charlie McCarthy
- League: Southern Combination Premier Division
- 2025–26: Southern Combination Premier Division, 17th of 20
- Website: https://www.lingfieldfc.com/
Home colours	Away colours	Third colours

Lingfield Football Club are a football club based in the village of Lingfield, near East Grinstead, east Sussex, England. The club is affiliated to the Surrey County Football Association. They are currently members of the Southern Combination Premier Division and play at Church Road, Whyteleafe, Surrey.

== History ==
They were established in 1893 and originally played in the Edenbridge & District League and the Surrey Junior league, at the same time. Before the First World War the club won the Edenbridge league six times and the Surrey Junior league once. After the War the club just competed in the Edenbridge league, as it had expanded and they could not play all of the fixtures for both leagues now. The club found more success in the Edenbridge league in the 1922–23 season, when they completed a double of League Champions and Edenbridge Hospital Cup. The next season saw the club join the Redhill and District League, but just two seasons later saw them again simultaneously compete in the Edenbridge League again, and winning it again in the 1929–30 campaign.

At the end of the 1930–31 season the club left both leagues to join the East Grinstead league, which they won at the first attempt. However, after one more season the club left the league and joined the newly formed Edenbridge and Caterham League. They then went on to win the league in the 1934–35 campaign, and successfully defended this title for the next two seasons. In 1938 the club had to move from their ground at High Street to a new ground at Talbot Road, as the local council wanted the land to build a school.

After the Second World War the club rejoined the Edenbridge and Caterham League, and winning another title in the 1952–53 season. Three seasons later the club was back in the Redhill and District league, and gaining promotion to the Premier Division of that league in the 1958–59 season, the first season at their new home of Godstone Road. The club remained in the Premier Division until the end of the 1969–70 campaign, when they were relegated back to Division one. It took the club just two seasons to become champions of Division one, but instead of being promoted to the Premier Division the club decided to join the Surrey Intermediate League.

Success in the Surrey Intermediate league came under the management of Dennis Moore, when in the 1976–77 season they gained Promotion from the Premier division 'B' to the Premier Division 'A' as champions. Further success followed the next season as they took the Premier Division 'A' title as well as winning the Surrey County Centenary Cup and the league cup. The club repeated the league and league cup double success again at the end of the 1978–79 campaign.

During the 1979–80 Campaign the club applied to the Sussex County League and the Combined Counties Football League, but were turned down by their first choice the Sussex league, as their ground was considered inadequate. However the Combined Counties league accepted the application and the club joined the league for the 1980–81 campaign. In their second season in the Combined Counties league the league was split into an east and west section, and the club finished runners-up in the Eastern section. The next season saw the club make their debut in the FA Vase where they were knocked out by Southwick 7–0 in the Preliminary qualifying round. The 1982–83 season also saw the club install floodlights at their ground, which enabled the club to join division two of the Sussex County League for the 1983–84 season.

Their Third season in the Sussex County league saw the club finish bottom of Division two and relegated to Division Three. The club would then finish bottom of Division Three for the next three seasons. Their application to remain in the league after the third consecutive bottom finish was rejected, and the club were relegated to the Mid-Sussex Football League. The club stayed in the Mid Sussex football league, until the end of the 1992–93 campaign, when they gained promotion back to Division three of the Sussex league under manager Dennis Moore.

Their first season back in the Sussex County league saw the team finish runners-up in Division three and gain promotion to Division two. However the following season they were straight back in Division three after finishing bottom of division two. It took the club another three seasons to get back up to division two and this time as champions. Two seasons later in the 1999-00 campaign the club finished bottom of Division two, but were spared relegation as several clubs left the league and two merged. However the following season another bottom finish and the club was back in Division three.

In the 2005–06 season, they were runners-up of the Division Three, earning promotion to Division Two. In season 2007–08 Lingfield were promoted to Sussex County Division One, under the management of Steve Perkins Jnr, when they finished as runners-up. Their first season in Division one saw the club enter the FA Cup for the first time, where they met Arundel in the extra preliminary qualifying round, but progressed no further after losing 3–0. The club have since then have been promoted back into the Southern Combination Football League Premier Division after finishing in 3rd place in the 2017/18 season, gaining automatic promotion. Also, the club lifted the Surrey County Premier Cup the season after, beating Nottsborough FC 1–0 in the final played at Meadowbank, Dorking. Since then, the club have remained in the SCFL Premier Division, finishing in and around mid-table for the last 5 seasons or so.

== Ground ==
Lingfield play their home games at The Sports Pavilion, Godstone Road, Lingfield, Surrey, RH7 6BT. Commonly known as “The Lair”

They have played at this ground since 1958, with floodlights being installed twenty five years later in 1983. The ground is also shared with the local Cricket Club.

Ahead of the 2023–24 season, Lingfield announced plans to groundshare at Horley Town for the upcoming season. The 2024-25 season saw the club split a further groundshare, firstly at Oakwood FC and then at Whyteleafe FC, whilst vital groundworks at The Lair took place. Delays to this work led to an additional temporary groundshare at Steyning Town FC for the start of the 2025-26 season, with a view to finally returning home later in the year. In summer 2026, they announce a two year groundshare with AFC whyteleafe until summer 2028.

== Honours ==
=== League honours ===
- Sussex County Football League Division Two:
  - Runners-up (1): 2007–08
- Sussex County Football League Division Three:
  - Champions (1): 1997–98
  - Runners-up (2): 1993–94, 2005–06
- Combined Counties Football League Eastern Division:
  - Runners-up (1): 1981–82
- Redhill and District Football League Division One:
  - Runners-up (1): 1958–59
- Mid-Sussex Football League Premier Division:
  - Champions (1): 1992–93
- Surrey Intermediate League Premier Division 'A':
  - Champions (1): 1977–78, 1978–79
- Surrey Intermediate League Premier Division 'B':
  - Champions (1): 1976–77
- Surrey Junior League :
  - Champions (1): 1913–14
- Edenbridge and Caterham League :
  - Champions (8): 1934–35, 1935–36, 1936–37, 1952–53
  - Runners-up (1): 1948–49
- East Grinstead League :
  - Champions (1): 1932–33
- Edenbridge League :
  - Champions (8): 1905–06, 1908–09, 1909–10, 1911–12, 1912–13, 1913–14, 1922–23, 1929–30

=== Cup honours ===
- Surrey FA Saturday Premier Cup
  - Winners (1): 2018–19
- Sussex County Football League Division Three Cup:
  - Runners up (2): 2004–05, 2005–06
- Redhill and District Football League Alderman Daniels Cup:
  - Runners up (1): 1968–69
- Surrey County Centenary Cup :
  - Winners (1): 1977–78
- Surrey Intermediate League Cup :
  - Winners (1): 1977–78, 1978–79
- East Surrey Charity Cup :
  - Winners (1): 1977–78
  - Runners up (1): 1960–61
- Edenbridge Charity Cup:
  - Winners (6): 1971–72, 1977–78, 1979–80, 1989–90, 1990–91, 1992–93
  - Runners up (2): 1961–62, 1978–79
- Edenbridge and Caterham Challenge Cup :
  - Winners (1): 1961–62
  - Runners up (2): 1960–61, 1962–63
- Oxted and Limpsfield Cup :
  - Runners up (1): 1956–57, 1958–59, 1964–65
- Caterham and Purley Cup:
  - Runners up (1): 1960–61
- Edenbridge Hospital Cup :
  - Winners (1): 1922–23
- Horley Hospital Cup :
  - Winners (1): 1935–36
- East Grinstead shield :
  - Winners (1): 1932–33
- Oxted Hospital Cup :
  - Runners up (1): 1960–61
- Oxted Charity Cup :
  - Winners (1): 1971–72
- Keith Hinckley Memorial Cup :
  - Winners (2): 1991–92, 1992–93
- Kenny Brown Memorial Trophy:
  - Winners (1): 1991–92

== Records ==
- Highest League Position: 8th in Southern Combination Football League Premier Division 2018–19
- FA Cup best performance: First qualifying round 2009–10, 2011–12, 2012–13, 2017–18, 2018–19
- FA Vase best performance: Third round 2014–15, 2023–24
- Highest Attendance: 1,200 vs Brighton & Hove Albion March 2, 1983 – Friendly Match

== Former players ==
A list of players that have played for the club at one stage and meet one of the following criteria;

1. Players that have played/managed in the football league or any foreign equivalent to this level (i.e. fully professional league).
2. Players with full international caps.
- (Dominica) Joel Etienne-Clark
- (England) Nicky Forster
- (England) Ian Pearce

== Former coaches ==
1. Managers/Coaches that have played/managed in the football league or any foreign equivalent to this level (i.e. fully professional league).
2. Managers/Coaches with full international caps.
- (England) Steve Perkins
