= 2019–20 Southern Combination Football League =

Southern Combination League
- Season: 2019–20
- Champions: None
- Promoted: None
- Relegated: None

The 2019–20 Southern Combination Football League season was the 95th in the history of the competition, which lies at levels 9 and 10 of the English football league system.

The provisional club allocations for steps 5 and 6 were first announced by the FA on 19 May 2019.

This season was also the first season the sin bin rule applied to this level of football.

== League suspension and season abandonment ==
On 16 March 2020, both the Football Association and the Sussex County Football Association announced that all football competitions for Non-League football would be put on hold until further notice due to the coronavirus pandemic. A video conference between the FA and other leagues at levels 9 and 10 was held on 24 March with a view to start proceedings whether to cancel null the league or to award promotion or relegation based on points per game.

As a result of the COVID-19 pandemic, this season's competition was formally abandoned on 26 March 2020, with all results from the season being expunged, and no promotion or relegation taking place to, from, or within the competition. On 30 March 2020, sixty-six non-league clubs sent an open letter to the Football Association requesting that they reconsider their decision.

== Premier Division ==
Southern Combination League Premier Division
- Season: 2019–20
- Dates: 3 August 2019 – 26 March 2020
- Champions: None
- Relegated: None
- Matches: 274
- Goals: 979 (3.57 per match)
- Top goalscorer: Lewis Finney (31 goals)
- Biggest home win: Horley Town 8–0 Loxwood (3 March 2020)
- Biggest away win: Hassocks 0–7 Eastbourne Town (18 January 2020)
- Highest scoring: Loxwood 3–6 Steyning (07 March 2020)
- Longest winning run: 9 Matches; Lancing; Newhaven
- Longest unbeaten run: 14 Matches; Newhaven
- Longest losing run: 7 Matches; Loxwood
- Highest attendance: 407; Peacehaven & Telscombe 2–3 Newhaven (26 December 2019)
- Lowest attendance: 30; Steyning Town Community 3–0 Saltdean United (27 August 2019)
- Total attendance: 25,503
- All statistics correct as of 26 March 2020.

The Premier Division consists of 20 clubs, the same as last season, after Arundel and Shoreham were relegated to Division One, and Chichester City were promoted to Isthmian League Division One South.

Three clubs joined the division:

- Alfold – promoted from Division One
- Steyning Town Community – promoted from Division One
- Horley Town – transferred from Combined Counties Football League Premier Division

=== Premier Division table at time of abandonment ===
Final table standing before the league was abandoned and expunged

Pos	Team	Pld	W	D	L	GF	GA	GD	Pts
1	Lancing	29	21	5	3	70	30	+40	68
2	Eastbourne Town	28	19	5	4	79	25	+54	62
3	Horley Town	29	19	4	6	66	37	+29	61
4	Newhaven	27	18	6	3	69	39	+30	60
5	Peacehaven & Telscombe	29	18	4	7	68	40	+28	58
6	Eastbourne United Association	27	13	3	11	51	54	−3	42
7	Crawley Down Gatwick	27	12	5	10	49	47	+2	41
8	AFC Uckfield Town	24	12	4	8	41	29	+12	40
9	Langney Wanderers	28	10	9	9	46	49	−3	39
10	Steyning Town Community	29	9	9	11	40	40	0	36
11	Alfold	25	10	4	11	46	48	−2	34
12	Horsham YMCA	30	9	6	15	56	69	−13	33
13	Little Common	26	8	7	11	43	42	+1	31
14	Pagham	31	9	4	18	34	56	−22	31
15	Lingfield	24	9	2	13	41	48	−7	29
16	Broadbridge Heath	28	8	5	15	37	70	−33	29
17	East Preston	27	7	4	16	42	60	−18	25
18	Saltdean United	27	7	4	16	32	53	−21	25
19	Hassocks	25	6	2	17	32	60	−28	20
20	Loxwood	28	1	6	21	37	83	−46	9

Updated to match(es) played on 26 March 2020. Source: FA Full-Time SCFL Premier table
Rules for classification: 1) Points; 2) Goal difference; 3) Number of goals scored; 4) Number of matches won; 5) Head-to-head results
Second place automatically promoted if one of four clubs in step 5 have the highest points per game (PPG) or one off play-off with last place in step 4.

=== Results table ===
Home \ Away	ALF	UCK	BBH	CDG	EBT	EBU	EPR	HSK	HOR	HYM	LAN	LAW	LIN	LCM	LOX	NEW	PAG	PAT	SDU	STT
Alfold		1–0	1–2	2–2		3–2	2–0		2–4	5–3							2–0	2–3	4–1	1–1
AFC Uckfield Town			1–0		1–1	1–2				1–2		1–0				4–2	2–0		1–2	
Broadbridge Heath	1–0			1–3	1–5	1–3	2–4	2–1	2–2			1–0	3–2	1–6	2–4	1–4		3–2	2–0	
Crawley Down Gatwick			1–2			0–1		3–2		1–1	1–2	1–3	1–1	4–1	3–2		2–1	1–2	5–1	0–0
Eastbourne Town	3–1	2–0	3–0	0–1			5–1	4–1	1–2	5–0		2–2	4–0			3–4	3–0	3–1		1–1
Eastbourne United Association	3–1	3–1			0–4		4–0	4–1		4–1	1–2		2–1	4–1	3–1		2–2	1–2		1–1
East Preston		1–1		5–2	0–2			1–2	2–3		0–1		0–3		0–0	1–4	1–2	1–2	0–3	1–3
Hassocks		0–4			0–7		2–1		0–2	3–2	1–2		1–3		6–2	2–3	2–0	0–1		2–1
Horley Town	3–3	0–1		5–1		3–0	3–1	2–0		2–1	1–0	3–1	0–2	1–0	8–0	1–4	4–1	2–1		3–2
Horsham YMCA	3–2	3–1	3–3		1–2	6–1	2–5	2–2	0–1		2–2			1–4	3–1	0–1		1–3		
Lancing	3–1	0–1	3–0	4–0	3–1	4–2	5–1	2–1	3–2	1–1		3–0	3–0		1–0	2–2	2–1		3–0	
Langney Wanderers	3–2	1–6	5–1	2–1	0–2	1–0	2–2	4–0	0–0	3–1			2–2	2–2	1–0	1–2	1–0	0–4		
Lingfield			4–2			6–0	0–2	3–2		3–4	1–5			0–2		1–2		2–3	0–1	0–2
Little Common	0–1	0–3	1–1	1–1	1–1	2–2	0–2	3–0	2–3	2–1	2–4		0–1			3–3	3–0	1–2		0–0
Loxwood	1–3	2–2		3–4	2–4		1–5		2–2	3–4	0–3			1–3		2–3		1–4	0–1	3–6
Newhaven	4–0	1–0	2–0	1–3	1–1				1–0	2–3	3–1	3–3		0–0	5–1				5–1	
Pagham	3–1	0–1	3–1	0–2	0–3	1–2		1–0		2–1	3–3	2–2		1–4	2–0	2–3		1–0	0–3	2–0
Peacehaven & Telscombe	1–2	4–4	5–0	2–1		3–2			3–1	3–0	1–1	3–3	6–2	2–1		2–3	1–0		3–0	1–1
Saltdean United	2–4	0–1	1–1	0–2	1–2	5–1	3–3	1–1		1–4	2–0		1–3	1–2			1–1			0–1
Steyning Town Community	0–0	2–3	3–1	2–3	0–5		1–2		1–3	0–0	1–2	1–2	0–1		2–1	1–1	2–0	2–1	3–0	

Updated to match(es) played on 15 March 2020. Source: FA Full-Time SCFL Fixtures and Results
Legend: Blue = home team win; Yellow = draw; Red = away team win.

=== Top scorers ===
Correct as of 26 March 2020

Rank	Player	Club	Goals
1	Lewis Finney	Lancing	32
2	Daniel Perry	Saltdean United (previously Eastbourne Town)	22
3	Ben Connolly	Lancing (previously Lingfield)	19
4	Matthew Daniel	Horsham YMCA	17
4	Lee Robinson	Newhaven	17
6	Zac Attwood	Eastbourne Town	13
6	Kerran Boylan	Lingfield (previously Horley Town	13
8	George Cousins	Alfold (previously Broadbridge Heath)	12
8	Tony Halsey	Horley Town	12
10	Alex Fair	Lancing	11

=== Stadia and locations ===
Map showing the location of teams in the Premier Division

Team	Location	Stadium	Capacity	Founded
Alfold	Alfold Crossways	Alfold Recreation Ground	1,000	1923
AFC Uckfield Town	Framfield	The Oaks	1,000	2014
Broadbridge Heath	Broadbridge Heath	High Wood Hill Sports Ground	1,000	1919
Crawley Down Gatwick	Crawley Down	The Haven Centre	1,000	1993
Eastbourne Town	Eastbourne	The Saffrons	3,000	1881
Eastbourne United	Eastbourne	The Oval	2,000	2003
East Preston	Littlehampton (East Preston)	The Lashmar	2,000	1966
Hassocks	Hassocks	The Beacon	1,500	1902
Horley Town	Horley	The New Defence	1,800	1896
Horsham YMCA	Horsham	Gorings Mead	1,575	1898
Lancing	Lancing	Culver Road	1,500	1941
Langney Wanderers	Eastbourne (Langney)	Priory Lane (groundshare with Eastbourne Borough) (Note: Langney unable to play at Shinewater Lane as the ground does not meet league requirements.)	4,151	2010
Lingfield	Lingfield	The Sports Pavilion	2,000	1893
Little Common	Eastbourne	The Oval (groundshare with Eastbourne United) (Note: Little Common unable to play at The Recreation Ground (Bexhill) as the ground does not meet league requirements.)	2,000	1966
Loxwood	Loxwood	Plaistow Road	1,000	1920
Newhaven	Newhaven	The Trafalgar Ground	3,000	1889
Pagham	Pagham	Nyetimber Lane	1,500	1903
Peacehaven & Telscombe	Peacehaven	The Sports Park	3,000	1923
Saltdean United	Brighton (Saltdean)	Hill Park	1,000	1966
Steyning Town Community	Steyning	The Shooting Field	2,000	1892

Broadbridge Heath moved to their new ground, called High Wood Hill, after playing at Broadbridge Heath Leisure Centre between 1987 and 2019.

== Division One ==
Southern Combination League Division One
- Season: 2019–20
- Dates: 3 August 2019 – 26 March 2020
- Champions: None
- Relegated: None
- Matches: 218
- Goals: 807 (3.7 per match)
- Biggest home win: Littlehampton Town 10–0 Billingshurst (5 October 2019)
- Biggest away win: Billingshurst 1–8 Roffey (4 January 2020)
- Highest scoring: Littlehampton Town 10–0 Billingshurst (5 October 2019)
- Longest winning run: 8 Matches; Littlehampton Town
- Longest unbeaten run: 22 Matches; Littlehampton Town
- Longest losing run: 14 Matches; Oakwood
- Highest attendance: 174; Bexhill United 2–1 Hailsham Town (26 December 2019)
- Lowest attendance: 22; Seaford Town 1–1 Selsey (19 November 2019)
- Total attendance: 8,114
- All statistics correct as of 26 March 2020.

Division One remains at 18 clubs after Alfold and Steyning Town were promoted to the Premier Division. One new club joined:

- Arundel – relegated from the Premier Division
- Roffey – promoted from Division Two
- Shoreham – relegated from the Premier Division

=== Division One table at time of abandonment ===
Final table standing before the league was abandoned and expunged

Pos	Team	Pld	W	D	L	GF	GA	GD	Pts	
1	Littlehampton Town	22	20	2	0	91	15	+76	62	
2	AFC Varndeanians	24	17	6	1	67	30	+37	57	
3	Mile Oak	23	15	3	5	67	38	+29	48	
4	Wick	23	14	4	5	63	41	+22	46	
5	Bexhill United	23	11	6	6	55	34	+21	39	
6	Midhurst & Easebourne	21	11	4	6	49	44	+5	37	
7	Seaford Town	22	10	4	8	47	37	+10	34	
8	Selsey	23	10	4	9	51	42	+9	34	
9	Arundel	17	10	2	5	43	26	+17	32	
10	Worthing United	25	8	5	12	46	48	−2	29	
11	Shoreham	19	6	2	11	25	42	−17	20	
12	Southwick	21	5	4	12	38	47	−9	19	Relegation to Mid Sussex Football League Championship
13	Roffey	21	6	1	14	38	54	−16	19	
14	Hailsham Town	20	5	1	14	33	59	−26	16	
15	Storrington	21	4	3	14	28	60	−32	15	
16	Oakwood	21	3	1	17	25	77	−52	10	
17	Billingshurst	22	3	0	19	16	88	−72	9	
18	Sidlesham	0	0	0	0	0	0	0	0 (Note: Sidlesham resigned from the league on 24 September 2019 and their playing record of P7 W0 D2 L5 GF8 GA17 Pts2 was expunged.)	Resigned from the league

Updated to match(es) played on 26 March 2020. Source: FA Full-Time Division 1 Table
Rules for classification: 1) Points; 2) Goal difference; 3) Number of goals scored; 4) Number of matches won; 5) Head-to-head results

=== Results table ===
Home \ Away	VAR	ARU	BEX	BIL	HAI	LIT	MDE	MOK	OAK	ROF	SEA	SEL	SHO	SID	SWK	STO	WIC	WRU
AFC Varndeanians		1–4	2–2	3–1	3–1	2–2	2–1	3–0	7–0	1–2	3–2		3–0			4–1	1–1	3–1
Arundel			2–1		4–1			0–3									3–0	3–1
Bexhill United	2–2	3–1			2–1		2–2	2–0	5–1	4–0		2–0	5–2		2–0	7–0	2–2	3–5
Billingshurst	1–6	0–4	1–3		3–1	0–4		1–6	3–1	1–8					2–1		0–5	
Hailsham Town	1–2	0–0		0–1		0–3			0–2			0–2			6–4		4–2	
Littlehampton Town			3–1	10–0	7–1		6–0		3–1	5–0	5–0	5–2			1–0	6–0		2–1
Midhurst & Easebourne			3–1	4–1		0–5			5–2	4–3	0–3	1–1	1–1			3–0		3–0
Mile Oak	3–3		1–0	5–0	7–2	3–3	4–5		3–2	1–1	4–2				2–1		2–3	1–3
Oakwood	0–2	2–2		2–0	0–7					0–3	2–7		0–1		2–6	4–1	2–7	0–3
Roffey		0–4		5–1			1–2	0–1				1–6				1–2	2–3	
Seaford Town		3–1	0–1	4–0	1–2	1–2		4–2		2–1		1–1	3–1		2–1	3–0	3–0	0–0
Selsey	1–2		2–1	5–1		0–4	2–3	2–3	6–0	2–3	2–1		5–0		2–1	2–2	0–2	3–1
Shoreham		2–1	2–2	4–0		2–4	2–5	0–2	4–2						1–0	2–0		0–1
Sidlesham																		
Southwick	0–2	1–2	2–2	2–1	6–1	0–6	1–1			5–1	1–1		3–0			1–3	3–3	0–6
Storrington	0–2	2–5		5–0			1–3	1–6	2–0	1–2		3–4					2–3	1–1
Wick	2–2	3–2			5–0	0–3	4–2	1–4		2–0	6–2	4–0	3–1					
Worthing United	3–5	3–5			4–2	1–2	1–6	0–3		3–4	2–2	1–1	2–0			1–1	1–2	

Updated to match(es) played on 15 March 2020. Source: FA Full-Time SCFL Fixtures and Results
Legend: Blue = home team win; Yellow = draw; Red = away team win.

=== Top scorers ===
Correct as of 26 March 2020

Rank	Player	Club	Goals
1	Joseph Benn	Mile Oak	28
2	Jack Shonk	Bexhill United	22
3	George Gaskin	Littlehampton Town	18
3	Max Davies	Selsey	18
3	Dion Jarvis	Littlehampton Town	18
6	Joseph Keehan	AFC Varndeanians	16
6	Matt Waterman	AFC Varndeanians	16
8	Scott Packer	AFC Varndeanians (previously Littlehampton Town)	14
9	Lucas Pattendon	Littlehampton Town	13
10	Thomas Biggs	Mile Oak	10

=== Stadia and locations ===
Map showing the location of teams in Division 1

Team	Location	Stadium	Capacity	Founded
AFC Varndeanians	Brighton (Withdean)	Withdean Stadium (groundshare with Brighton Electricity)	8,850	1929
Arundel	Arundel	Mill Road	2,200	1889
Bexhill United	Bexhill-on-Sea	The Polegrove	—	2002
Billingshurst	Billingshurst	Jubilee Fields	—	1891
Hailsham Town	Hailsham	The Beaconsfield	2,000	1885
Littlehampton Town	Littlehampton	St Flora Sportsfield (groundshare with Littlehampton United)	4,000	1896
Midhurst & Easebourne	Easebourne	Rotherfield	—	1946
Mile Oak	Brighton (Mile Oak)	Mile Oak Recreation Ground	—	1960
Oakwood	Crawley (Three Bridges)	Tinsley Lane	—	1962
Roffey	Horsham (Roffey)	Bartholomew Way	—	1901
Seaford Town	Seaford	The Crouch	—	1888
Selsey	Selsey	Bunn Leisure Stadium	—	1903
Shoreham	Shoreham-by-Sea	Middle Road	2,000	1892
Sidlesham	Sidlesham	The Recreation Ground, Sidlesham	—	1946
Southwick	Brighton (Southwick)	Old Barn Way	2,000	1882
Storrington	Storrington	The Recreation Ground, Storrington	—	1883
Wick	Littlehampton (Wick)	Crabtree Park	2,000	1892
Worthing United	Worthing (Broadwater)	The Robert Albon Memorial Ground	1,504	1988

== Division Two ==
Southern Combination League Division Two
- Season: 2019–20
- Dates: 3 August 2019 – 26 March 2020
- Champions: None
- Relegated: None
- Matches: 155
- Goals: 631 (4.07 per match)
- Biggest home win: Montpelier Villa 17–1 Bosham (24 August 2019)
- Biggest away win: Brighton Electricity 1–10 Worthing Town (14 September 2019)
- Highest scoring: Montpelier Villa 17–1 Bosham (24 August 2019)
- Longest winning run: 15 Matches; Montpelier Villa
- Longest unbeaten run: 17 Matches; Montpelier Villa
- Longest losing run: 9 Matches; Brighton Electricity
- Highest attendance: 100; Ferring 4–4 Littlehampton United (23 November 2019)
- Lowest attendance: 5 Worthing Town 0–2 St Francis Rangers (7 December 2019)
- Total attendance: 3,018
- All statistics correct as of 26 March 2020.

Division Two remained at 15 teams and features two new clubs after Roffey were promoted to Division One:

- St Francis Rangers – who withdrew from Division One during the 2018–19 season, re-entered as an intermediate team.
- TD Shipley – promoted from the West Sussex Football League
- Angmering Seniors changed their name to Angmering Village

Promotion from this division depends on ground grading as well as league position.

=== League table at time of abandonment ===
Final table standing before the league was abandoned and expunged

Pos	Team	Pld	W	D	L	GF	GA	GD	Pts	
1	Montpelier Villa	20	17	2	1	83	22	+61	53	
2	Upper Beeding	21	14	4	3	72	22	+50	46	
3	Copthorne	21	13	2	6	65	30	+35	41	
4	Rustington	19	10	2	7	45	29	+16	32	
5	Jarvis Brook	17	9	3	5	44	24	+20	30	
6	St Francis Rangers	17	9	2	6	29	18	+11	29	
7	Littlehampton United	16	8	2	6	54	47	+7	26	
8	TD Shipley	11	7	1	3	35	19	+16	22	
9	Angmering Village	18	7	1	10	35	61	−26	22	Transferred to the West Sussex Football League
10	Worthing Town	17	6	2	9	34	32	+2	20	
11	Bosham	20	6	1	13	30	76	−46	19	
12	Rottingdean Village	17	3	3	11	29	56	−27	12	
13	Ferring	22	2	2	18	21	92	−71	8	
14	Brighton Electricity	18	1	3	14	22	70	−48	6	
15	Cowfold	0	0	0	0	0	0	0	0 (Note: Cowfold resigned from the league on 16 October 2019 and their playing record of P8 W2 D1 L5 GF11 GA22 Pts7 was expunged.)	Resigned from the league

Updated to match(es) played on 26 March 2020. Source: FA Full-Time SCFL Division 2 Table
Rules for classification: 1) points; 2) goal difference; 3) number of goals scored.

=== Results table ===
Home \ Away	ANG	BOS	BRE	COP	COW	FER	JAR	LIT	MON	ROT	RUS	STF	TDS	UBD	WOR
Angmering Village		5–1	3–1	3–2				3–1		1–0			3–4	0–0	2–3
Bosham			5–1	3–2		3–0	1–5	0–6		4–3	3–2	0–3	1–5		0–1
Brighton Electricity	2–6	1–1		1–3			2–1		1–2		1–9	1–2			1–10
Copthorne	7–0	7–0	3–1			7–0	0–1	8–0		2–1	2–1	2–2		3–2	2–1
Cowfold															
Ferring	0–3	1–4	4–2				0–8	4–4	1–4	1–1	0–5	1–8	0–3	0–4	2–1
Jarvis Brook	6–1	H/W (Note: Jarvis Brook v Bosham (30 November 2019) was declared a home walkover after Bosham forfeited the match.)	2–2	4–0		7–1			2–1	2–1	2–2	0–1		2–2	1–2
Littlehampton United	6–0	8–1		2–3		7–1				4–2		1–0		2–3	3–1
Montpelier Villa	2–0	17–1	4–1	3–2		6–0	5–1	11–2		5–1	3–2	3–1	2–0	1–1	4–2
Rottingdean Village	2–0		3–3	0–6		2–1		5–6	0–4		1–1		2–3		3–1
Rustington	5–0	4–1	3–1			2–0			0–1	2–0		3–1		0–4	2–4
St Francis Rangers	1–2	3–0	H/W (Note: St Francis Rangers v Brighton Electricity (28 December 2019) was declared a home walkover after Brighton Electricity forfeited the match.)					1–1			2–0			0–2	
TD Shipley	10–1			3–0					3–3					0–3	3–2
Upper Beeding	8–3		9–0	1–3		6–1	3–0	4–1	1–2	11–2	4–0	1–0	2–1		
Worthing Town		1–2		1–1		3–2					0–1	0–2		1–1	

Updated to match(es) played on 15 March 2020. Source: SCFL Fixtures and Results
Legend: Blue = home team win; Yellow = draw; Red = away team win.

=== Top scorers ===
Correct as of 26 March 2020

Rank	Player	Club	Goals
1	Kristian Harding	Upper Beeding	32
2	Tom Foxon	Littlehampton United	5
2	Jonathan Hendrick	Angmering Village	5
4	Stuart Cameron	Copthorne	14
5	Liam O'Hanion	Montpelier Villa	13
5	Charlie Parmiter	Montpelier Villa	13
7	Alex Barnes	Bosham	11
7	Tommy Overton	Jarvis Brook	11
7	Johnathon Taylor	Upper Beeding	11
10	Jack Jenkins	Copthorne	10

=== Stadia and locations ===
Map showing the location of teams in Division 2

Team	Location	Stadium	Capacity	Founded
Angmering Village	Angmering	Decoy Drive	—	—
Bosham	Bosham	Walton Lane	—	1901
Brighton Electricity	Brighton (Withdean)	Withdean Stadium (groundshare with AFC Varndeanians)	8,850	—
Copthorne	Copthorne	King Georges Field	—	2004
Cowfold	Cowfold	Cowfold Playing Field	—	1897
Ferring	Ferring	The Glebelands	—	1952
Jarvis Brook	Crowborough	Limekiln	—	1888
Littlehampton United	Littlehampton	St Flora Sportsfield (groundshare with Littlehampton Town	4,000	1947
Montpelier Villa	Brighton (Falmer)	Sussex University	—	1991
Rottingdean Village	Brighton (Rottingdean)	Rottingdean Sports Centre	—	—
Rustington	Rustington	Rustington Recreation Ground	—	1903
St Francis Rangers	Haywards Heath	Colwell Ground	1000	2002
TD Shipley	Shipley (Dragon's Green)	Dragons Green	—	1994
Upper Beeding	Upper Beeding	Memorial Playing Field	—	—
Worthing Town	Worthing	Palatine Park	—	1995

== Peter Bentley League Challenge Cup ==
Source 2019-20 Peter Bentley Challenge Cup

=== First round ===
10 August 2019	Seaford Town	1–3	Mile Oak	Seaford
15:00	Jamie Buckett 79'	Report	Adam Dine 3' 37'; Jack Marriott 84'	Stadium: The Crouch; Attendance: 52

10 August 2019	Sidlesham	2–3	Roffey	Sidlesham
15:00	Tomas Bayley 47'; Morgan Forry 75'	Report	Jordan Stallibrass 20' 67'; Oluwaseun Olabiyi 37'	Stadium: Recreation Ground; Attendance: 34

10 August 2019	Southwick	1–2	Hailsham Town	Southwick
15:00	Sam Blundell 88'	Report	Samuel Townsend 21'; Connor Townsend 42'	Stadium: Old Barn Way; Attendance: 54

10 August 2019	Storrington	0–3	Midhurst & Easebourne	Storrington
15:00		Report	Matt Rowland 30' 39'; Josh Sheehan 61'	Stadium: The Recreation Ground; Attendance: 54

10 August 2019	Wick	2–0	Billingshurst	Wick
15:00	Ryan Singers; Will Lintott 70'	Report		Stadium: Crabtree Park; Attendance: 42

10 August 2019	Worthing United	0–4	Oakwood	Worthing
15:00		Report	Joshua Neathey 21' 85'; Mitchell Casselman 45'; Charlie Adsett 65'	Stadium: The Robert Albon Memorian Ground; Attendance: 32

=== Second round ===
3 September 2019	Broadbridge Heath	2-4	Loxwood	Broadbridge Heath
19:45	Jamie Taylor 41' 64'	Report	Matthew Hards 21'; Timothy Bennett 56' 60'; Matthew Boiling 65'	Stadium: High Wood Hill Sports Centre; Attendance: 116

3 September 2019	Crawley Down Gatwick	6-2	Roffey	Horsham
19:45	Oliver Moore 36'; Oli Leslie 62' 93' 118'; Blair Cooney 95'; Joshua Brown 119'	Report		Stadium: Gorings Mead

3 September 2019	East Preston	3-1	Arundel	East Preston
19:30	David Crouch 19'; Howard Neighbour 93'; Chris Darwin 116'	Report		Stadium: The Lashmar; Attendance: 72

3 September 2019	Eastbourne United Association	2-1	Bexhill United	Eastbourne
19:45	Christopher Cumming-Bart 46'; Paul Rogers 56'	Report	Joel Kalambayi	Stadium: The Oval; Attendance: 105

3 September 2019	Hailsham Town	0-5	Little Common	Hailsham
19:30		Report	Jamie Crone 7' 37' 62'; Sam Cruttwell 51'; Lewis Hole 70'	Stadium: Beaconsfield; Attendance: 89

3 September 2019	Littlehampton Town	7-1	Alfold	Littlehampton
19:45	Lucas Pattendon 17' 59'; Dion Jarvis 29'; George Gaskin 52' 72'; Ben Gray 70'; Jordan Layton 85'	Report	Kelvin Lucas 44'	Stadium: The Sportsfield; Attendance: 45

3 September 2019	Newhaven	1-3	Lancing	Newhaven
19:45		Report	Lucas Finney 90+3' 112'; George Mitchell-Phillips 99'	Stadium: The Trafalgar Ground; Attendance: 117

3 September 2019	Pagham	2-0	Oakwood	Pagham
19:45	Conor Geoghegan 74'; Joseph Clarke 86'	Report		Stadium: Nytimeber Lane; Attendance: 132

3 September 2019	Saldean United	0-3	Lingfield	Saltdean
19:30		Report	Ben Connolly; Sammy Clements	Stadium: Hill Park; Attendance: 64

3 September 2019	Selsey	2-1	Horley Town	Selsey
19:45	Joe Bennett 55'; Lindon Miller 115'	Report	Kerran Boylan 35'	Stadium: The High Street Ground; Attendance: 128

3 September 2019	Wick	4-2	Midhurst & Easebourne	Wick
19:45		Report	Duncan Brown 56'; Harry Tollworthy 82'	Stadium: Crabtree Park

14 September 2019	AFC Uckfield Town	3–1	AFC Varndeanians	Uckfield
15:00	Liam Baitup 9'; Bailio Camara 84'; Matthew Rodrigues-Barbosa 90+2'	Report	Josh Gould	Stadium: The Oaks

17 September 2019	Steyning Town	4–0	Horsham YMCA	Steyning
19:45	Grant Radmore 17' 57' 80'; Joao Tiago Andrade 51'			Stadium: The Shooting Field; Attendance: 33

24 September 2019	Eastbourne Town	1–2	Peacehaven & Telscombe	Eastbourne
19:45	Tom Vickers 67'		Matthew Cheeseman 32'; Josh Marshall 6'	Stadium: The Saffrons

25 September 2019	Mile Oak	4–0	Shoreham	Mile Oak
19:15	Joseph Benn 7' 16' 30'; Adam Dine 38'			Stadium: Mile Oak Recreation Ground

12 October 2019	Hassocks	2-4	Langney Wanderers	Hassocks
15:00			Joe Summerbell 10'; Mohammad Mekawir 71'; Daniel Blackmore 87'; Max Hollobone 90+5'	Stadium: The Beacon

=== Third round ===
14 September 2019	Littlehampton Town	1–0	Lingfield	Littlehampton
19:45	Harry Russell 38'			Stadium: The Sportsfield

12 October 2019	Loxwood	2-3	East Preston	Loxwood
15:00	Sam Karl 6'; Joshua Hawkes 28'		Howard Neighbour 11'; Daniel Simmonds 36'; David Crouch 120'	Stadium: Plaistow Road

12 October 2019	Eastbourne United Association	4-0	Pagham	Eastbourne
15:00	Paul Rogers 26' 79'; Nathan Crabb 32' 72'			Stadium: The Oval

12 October 2019	AFC Uckfield Town	3-1	Little Common	Uckfield
15:00	Liam Baitup 3' 19'; Anthony Storey 11'		Lewis Hole 60'	Stadium: The Oaks

15 October 2019	Steyning Town	4-2	Selsey	Steyning
19:45	Rob Clark 25'; Charles Romain 112'; Tiago Andrade 114'; Toby Bloomfield 120'			Stadium: The Shooting Field

15 October 2019	Peacehaven & Telscombe	4-0	Wick	Peacehaven
19:45	Josh Marshall 11'; Curtis Ford 48' 85'; Cameron Wiltshire 87'			Stadium: The Sports Park

15 October 2019	Crawley Down Gawick	0-1	Lancing	Crawley Down
19:30			James Rhodes 15'	Stadium: The Haven Centre

30 October 2019	Langney Wanderers	1–2	Mile Oak	Eastbourne
	Shane Saunders 20'		George Rudwick 68'; Jack Stenning 82'	Stadium: Priory Lane

=== Quarter-final ===
12 November 2019	East Preston	2–0	Steyning Town	East Preston
19:30	David Crouch 28'; Johan Van Driel 65'	Report		Stadium: Roundstone Recreation Ground; Attendance: 48

12 November 2019	Littlehampton Town	2–0	Mile Oak	Littlehampton
19:30	George Gaskin 28'; Alfie Davidson 90+6'	Report		Stadium: The Sportsfield; Attendance: 60

3 March 2020	Eastbourne United Association	1–3	AFC Uckfield Town	Eastbourne
19:45	Dominic Cole 89'	Report	Jack Samways 24'; Callum Smith 27' 83'	Stadium: The Oval; Referee: Jake Woodman

12 November 2019	Peacehaven & Telscombe	3–2 (a.e.t.)	Lancing	Peacehaven
19:30	Marcus Allen 82'; Matthew Cheeseman 90+5'; Tyler Capon ET15'	Report	Lewis Finney 4' 65'	Stadium: The Sports Park; Attendance: 135

=== Semi-final ===
21 April 2020	East Preston	v	Littlehampton Town	Steyning
				Stadium: Shooting Field

9 April 2020	AFC Uckfield Town	v	Peacehaven & Telscombe	Eastbourne
				Stadium: The Saffrons

=== Final ===
4 May 2020	v	Lancing
		Stadium: Culver Road

== Division One Challenge Cup ==
Source SCFL Fixtures and Results

=== First round ===
26 October 2019	Selsey	3–5	Bexhill United	Selsey
15:00				Stadium: The High Street Ground

26 October 2019	Worthing United	3–4	AFC Varndeanians	Worthing
15:00				Stadium: The Robert Albon Memorial Ground

=== Second round ===
19 November 2019	Billingshurst	0–6	Southwick	Billingshurst
19:45		Report		Stadium: Jubilee Fields

26 October 2019	Oakwood	H–W	Sidlesham	Crawley
15:00		Report		Stadium: Tinsley Lane

26 October 2019	Roffey	2–0	Wick	Horsham
15:00				Stadium: Chennells Brook

26 October 2019	Seaford Town	1–0	Midhurst & Easebourne	Seaford
15:00				Stadium: The Crouch

25 February 2020	Bexhill United	3–0	Mile Oak	Bexhill-on-Sea
19:30				Stadium: The Polegrove

26 October 2019	Shoreham	2–2 (a.e.t.) (3–4 p)	Hailsham Town	Shoreham
15:00		Report		Stadium: Middle Road

26 October 2019	Storrington	0–6	Littlehampton Town	Storrington
15:00				Stadium: The Recreation Ground

13 March 2020	AFC Varndeanians	v	Arundel	Brighton
19:15				Stadium: Withdean Stadium

=== Quarter-final ===
31 March 2020	Littlehampton Town	v	Hailsham Town	Littlehampton
19:30				Stadium: The Sportsfield

31 March 2020	Southwick	v	Oakwood	Southwick
19:45				Stadium: Old Barn Way

31 March 2020	Seaford Town	v	Bexhill United	Seaford
19:30				Stadium: The Crouch

TBA	Roffey	v	AFC Varndeanians or Arundel	Horsham
TBA				Stadium: Chennels Brook
