= 2023–24 Southern Combination Football League =

The 2023–24 Southern Combination Football League season was the 99th in the history of the competition, which lies at levels 9, 10 and 11 (steps 5 and 6, and county feeder) of the English football league system.

The constitution was announced on 15 May 2023. Starting this season, the Premier Division (Step 5) in the league promotes two clubs; one as champions and one via a four-team play-off. This replaced the previous inter-step play-off system. For this season only, there was only one club relegated from the division.

== Premier Division ==
The Premier Division comprised 20 clubs from the previous season, 17 of which competed in the previous season

=== Team changes ===
To the Premier Division

Promoted from Division One

- Shoreham

Transferred from Wessex Football League Premier Division

- Pagham

Relegated from the Isthmian League South East Division

- Haywards Heath Town

From the Premier Division

Promoted to the Isthmian League South East Division

- Broadbridge Heath

Relegated to Division One

- Alfold
- Roffey

=== League table ===
Southern Combination League Premier Division
- Season: 2023–24
- Dates: 29 July 2023 – 5 May 2024
- Champions: Steyning Town
- Promoted: Steyning Town; Eastbourne Town
- Relegated: AFC Uckfield Town
- Matches: 380
- Goals: 1,330 (3.5 per match)
- Top goalscorer: Oli Lesley (29 goals)
- Biggest home win: Steyning Town 10–1 AFC Uckfield Town (27 April 2024)
- Biggest away win: AFC Uckfield Town 1–8 Crawley Down Gatwick (30 December 2023)
- Highest scoring: Steyning Town 10–1 AFC Uckfield Town (27 April 2024)
- Longest winning run: 9 matches Eastbourne Town
- Longest unbeaten run: 21 matches Newhaven
- Longest losing run: 11 matches Saltdean United
- Highest attendance: 884; Peacehaven & Telscombe 1–3 Newhaven (26 December 2023)
- Lowest attendance: 34; Pagham 1–3 Steyning Town (23 January 2024)
- Total attendance: 60,750
- Average attendance: 162.0

Pos	Team	Pld	W	D	L	GF	GA	GD	Pts	Promotion, qualification or relegation
1	Steyning Town (C, P)	38	27	7	4	119	36	+83	88	Promotion to the Isthmian League
2	Eastbourne Town (O, P)	38	26	4	8	71	31	+40	82	Qualified for the play-offs, then promoted to Isthmian League
3	Crowborough Athletic	38	25	6	7	81	36	+45	81	Qualification for the play-offs
4	Newhaven	38	23	10	5	99	55	+44	79	Qualification for the play-offs
5	Hassocks	38	24	6	8	87	42	+45	78	Qualification for the play-offs
6	Eastbourne United Association	38	20	12	6	67	40	+27	72	
7	Haywards Heath Town	38	23	6	9	90	45	+45	69 (Note: Haywards Heath Town deducted 6 points for ineligible player.)	
8	Peacehaven & Telscombe	38	18	7	13	62	42	+20	61	
9	Crawley Down Gatwick	38	19	3	16	86	63	+23	60	
10	Midhurst & Easebourne	38	17	8	13	75	74	+1	59	
11	Lingfield	38	13	8	17	57	65	−8	47	
12	Little Common	38	14	4	20	63	82	−19	46	
13	Pagham	38	11	11	16	59	64	−5	44	
14	Horsham YMCA	38	11	9	18	48	69	−21	42	
15	Shoreham	38	9	9	20	53	94	−41	36	
16	Loxwood	38	7	9	22	46	87	−41	30	
17	AFC Varndeanians	38	7	4	27	32	95	−63	25	
18	Bexhill United	38	6	9	23	57	89	−32	24 (Note: Bexhill deducted 3 points for ineligible player.)	
19	Saltdean United	38	6	5	27	44	94	−50	23	
20	AFC Uckfield Town (R)	38	3	5	30	34	127	−93	14	Relegation to Division One

Source: scfl.org.uk
Rules for classification: 1) points; 2) goal difference; 3) number of goals scored; 4) number of matches won; 5) head-to-head results
(C) Champions; (O) Play-off winners; (P) Promoted; (R) Relegated

=== Play-offs ===
Semi-finals
2	Eastbourne Town	2
5	Hassocks	0
3	Crowborough Athletic	1(4)
4	Newhaven	1(5)

Final
2	Eastbourne Town	2
4	Newhaven	0

==== Semi-finals ====
30 April 2024	Eastbourne Town	2–0	Hassocks	Eastbourne
19:45 GMT	31' 45' James Hull	Report		Stadium: The Saffrons; Attendance: 604; Referee: Tazlim Ali

30 April 2024	Crowborough Athletic	1–1 (4–5 p)	Newhaven	Crowborough
19:45 GMT	31' William Puffette	Report	22' Robbie Keith	Stadium: Alderbrook; Attendance: 543; Referee: Simon Faires

==== Final ====
5 May 2024	Eastbourne Town	2-0	Newhaven	Eastbourne
15:00 GMT	83' Ollie Davies; 85' James Stone	Report		Stadium: The Saffrons; Attendance: 1131; Referee: Greig Walker

=== Results table ===
Home \ Away	UCK	VAR	BEX	CDG	CRO	EBT	EBU	HHT	HSK	HYM	LIN	LCM	LOX	MID	NEW	PAG	PAT	SDU	SHO	STT
AFC Uckfield Town		3–1	1–2	1–8	0–6	0–7	1–4	1–5	0–4	2–3	0–2	0–1	2–2	2–4	0–1	0–2	2–5	3–0	1–3	1–1
AFC Varndeanians	1–1		2–1	1–0	1–1	0–4	1–3	0–2	0–2	0–5	1–2	0–1	1–0	1–3	0–5	0–2	0–3	0–0	1–3	0–3
Bexhill United	4–0	1–2		1–2	0–5	2–3	1–1	0–1	2–2	2–0	3–3	0–2	1–1	3–3	3–4	5–3	0–1	0–1	0–4	1–5
Crawley Down Gatwick	4–2	1–2	3–2		2–1	1–3	4–2	2–3	0–1	4–2	0–1	6–0	4–1	4–1	1–4	1–1	1–3	4–1	3–0	3–3
Crowborough Athletic	3–0	3–1	1–0	3–1		0–1	3–0	2–1	5–2	1–0	1–0	3–2	1–1	2–2	1–1	0–1	3–1	3–1	5–0	0–2
Eastbourne Town	1–0	2–1	2–0	0–1	1–2		3–0	2–1	0–3	4–0	0–2	1–0	1–2	2–0	1–2	2–0	2–1	3–0	0–0	1–0
Eastbourne United Association	3–1	4–1	3–1	2–0	0–0	2–2		1–1	3–0	3–0	2–0	1–0	2–0	2–0	1–2	2–1	1–0	7–0	1–1	1–1
Haywards Heath Town	6–0	0–1	3–2	4–1	2–1	0–1	1–1		2–0	1–1	2–1	4–4	3–0	8–0	0–1	2–0	2–0	3–1	7–1	1–1
Hassocks	1–1	5–0	5–0	3–1	1–2	1–1	0–0	2–3		0–0	4–1	2–1	4–0	3–1	5–1	3–1	2–0	4–0	3–1	0–4
Horsham YMCA	0–3	3–1	3–1	0–5	1–2	0–0	1–2	1–2	0–1		1–0	1–2	2–1	1–0	1–1	3–0	2–1	3–1	2–2	2–2
Lingfield	2–0	2–2	1–1	0–1	1–2	0–1	1–2	0–2	1–0	4–1		3–2	3–0	2–3	1–3	2–2	1–1	2–1	1–2	1–6
Little Common	3–1	2–1	3–3	1–4	3–2	1–2	1–2	0–1	1–4	2–1	4–3		4–1	1–2	2–5	1–4	1–2	2–1	2–1	0–2
Loxwood	1–1	2–1	3–2	2–3	1–2	1–4	0–2	4–3	0–3	2–2	1–2	3–2		3–3	2–4	2–2	0–2	1–2	1–1	0–4
Midhurst & Easebourne	7–0	3–2	4–2	3–2	2–1	1–2	5–0	2–2	0–3	1–1	2–2	2–0	2–1		1–1	2–0	1–2	1–0	6–2	0–5
Newhaven	6–1	6–2	1–2	4–2	1–1	0–4	1–1	3–2	1–1	3–0	2–3	1–1	4–0	6–2		2–2	1–0	5–3	6–1	0–4
Pagham	4–0	2–0	2–2	0–1	0–2	2–3	3–3	0–3	1–2	3–1	1–1	1–4	0–0	1–1	0–0		0–0	3–1	4–0	1–3
Peacehaven & Telscombe	4–0	5–0	4–0	3–2	1–2	0–1	0–0	1–3	1–2	4–0	1–1	1–0	2–0	2–0	1–3	2–1		2–1	2–2	1–1
Saltdean United	4–1	1–2	2–2	1–0	1–2	0–3	1–2	0–1	4–3	2–2	3–2	2–2	2–3	1–2	0–3	2–3	0–1		1–4	0–3
Shoreham	2–1	2–1	0–4	0–3	0–4	3–1	1–1	3–2	1–3	1–2	0–2	2–4	3–4	0–2	1–1	2–4	1–1	2–2		0–2
Steyning Town	10–1	7–1	3–1	1–1	1–3	2–0	1–0	4–1	2–3	3–0	5–1	7–1	1–0	2–1	2–4	4–2	3–1	5–1	4–1	

Source: SCFL Fixture Grid
Legend: Blue = home team win; Yellow = draw; Red = away team win.

=== Results by matchday ===
Matchday	1	2	3	4	5	6	7	8	9	10	11	12	13	14	15	16	17	18	19	20	21	22	23	24	25	26	27	28	29	30	31	32	33	34	35	36	37	38
AFC Uckfield Town	W	L	W	L	L	L	L	L	L	L	L	D	D	D	D	L	L	L	L	L	L	L	L	L	L	W	L	L	W	L	L	D	L	L	L	L	L	L
AFC Varndeanians	L	D	L	W	L	L	L	L	L	L	L	L	L	W	D	L	L	L	L	W	W	L	L	L	L	L	L	L	L	D	L	L	L	W	D	L	W	L
Bexhill United	L	L	L	L	L	W	W	D	L	L	D	L	L	W	L	L	D	L	L	W	D	D	D	L	L	D	L	D	D	L	L	W	L	W	L	L	L	L
Crawley Down Gatwick	W	L	L	L	L	W	L	L	W	W	L	L	W	W	W	L	D	L	W	W	L	W	W	L	D	D	W	W	W	L	L	W	W	W	W	L	W	L
Crowborough Athletic	W	W	W	D	W	W	L	W	D	W	W	W	W	W	W	W	L	W	W	W	W	L	D	L	W	L	W	W	D	W	W	D	W	D	W	L	L	W
Eastbourne Town	D	L	L	W	W	W	W	W	W	W	W	L	W	L	D	L	W	L	W	L	D	W	L	W	W	W	W	W	W	W	W	W	D	W	W	W	W	W
Eastbourne United Association	D	W	D	W	W	W	W	L	L	D	W	L	D	W	D	W	W	D	D	D	D	W	W	W	W	D	W	W	D	L	W	L	D	L	W	W	W	W
Hassocks	D	W	W	W	W	W	L	W	W	W	D	D	D	L	W	W	W	W	D	L	L	W	W	W	W	W	W	W	L	L	D	W	W	W	L	W	L	W
Haywards Heath Town	D	D	W	W	L	W	W	L	W	W	W	L	L	L	D	W	D	W	W	W	D	W	W	W	W	D	W	L	L	W	W	W	W	W	W	L	L	W
Horsham YMCA	D	D	L	W	W	D	L	L	L	L	D	W	W	L	L	D	D	W	L	W	L	L	D	L	D	W	L	L	W	L	L	L	L	D	W	W	L	W
Lingfield	D	D	L	D	L	W	W	D	D	W	W	L	L	L	L	L	W	W	W	W	L	D	W	L	W	D	L	W	D	L	L	L	L	L	W	W	L	L
Little Common	W	W	W	D	L	D	W	L	L	W	L	L	W	L	L	L	L	W	D	D	L	L	W	W	L	L	W	L	W	L	W	L	W	L	L	L	L	W
Loxwood	L	L	D	L	L	D	W	L	L	L	D	W	L	W	W	L	W	L	L	L	D	W	L	L	W	L	D	L	L	L	D	D	D	L	D	L	L	L
Midhurst & Easebourne	D	W	D	L	L	W	D	W	D	W	L	L	W	W	W	W	W	L	L	W	W	D	L	L	D	D	W	L	W	L	L	L	D	L	L	W	W	W
Newhaven	D	D	W	D	W	L	W	W	W	W	W	D	W	D	W	W	W	W	W	W	W	D	W	D	W	D	W	L	W	W	W	D	L	W	D	W	L	L
Pagham	L	W	L	L	L	D	L	D	W	W	L	D	W	L	W	W	L	D	D	L	W	W	L	L	L	L	W	D	D	D	D	L	D	W	D	L	L	W
Peacehaven & Telscombe	W	W	D	W	W	W	W	L	W	W	W	L	L	D	W	L	D	W	W	D	L	W	D	L	L	D	L	L	L	W	L	W	W	L	W	D	W	L
Saltdean United	L	W	L	L	L	D	L	W	L	L	D	L	D	L	L	L	L	L	L	L	L	L	L	L	D	L	L	L	W	L	L	L	W	W	D	L	W	L
Shoreham	L	L	D	L	L	L	L	L	L	L	D	W	L	L	D	W	W	D	L	L	L	D	L	W	L	D	W	W	L	W	W	D	D	L	L	W	D	L
Steyning Town	W	W	W	W	W	W	W	D	D	W	W	L	D	L	L	W	W	L	D	W	D	D	W	W	W	W	W	W	D	W	W	W	W	W	W	W	W	W

Source: The FA Full-Time SCFL Premier Division
W = Win; D = Draw; L = Loss

=== Top scorers ===
Rank	Player	Club	Goals
1	Oli Lesley	Crawley Down Gatwick	29
2	Alfie Rogers	Newhaven	27
3	Lewis Rustell	Midhurst & Easebourne	25
4	Callum Barlow	Eastbourne United Association	24
4	Daniel Simmonds	Pagham	24
6	Jack Shonk	Bexhill United	22
7	Thomas Chalaye	Steyning Town	18
7	Harry Shooman	Steyning Town	18
7	Hayden Skerry	Haywards Heath Town	18
10	Liam Benson	Haywards Heath Town (previously Hassocks)	16

=== Stadia and locations ===
Map showing the location of teams in the Premier Division

Team	Location	Stadium	Capacity
AFC Varndeanians	Brighton (Withdean)	Withdean Stadium (groundshare with Brighton Electricity)	8,850
AFC Uckfield Town	Framfield	The Oaks	600
Bexhill United	Bexhill-on-Sea	The Polegrove	1,000
Crawley Down Gatwick	Crawley Down	The Haven Centre	1,000
Crowborough Athletic	Crowborough	Crowborough Community Stadium	2,000
Eastbourne Town	Eastbourne	The Saffrons	4,500
Eastbourne United Association	Eastbourne	The Oval	1,200
Hassocks	Hassocks	The Beacon	1,000
Haywards Heath Town	Haywards Heath	Hanbury Park	2,000
Horsham YMCA	Horsham	Gorings Mead	1,500
Lingfield	Horley	The New Defence (groundshare with Horley Town)	1,800
Little Common	Bexhill-on-Sea (Little Common)	Little Common Recreation Ground	1,200
Loxwood	Loxwood	Plaistow Road	1,000
Midhurst & Easebourne	Easebourne	Rotherfield	1,000
Newhaven	Newhaven	The Trafalgar Ground	3,000
Pagham	Pagham	Nyetimber Lane	1,500
Peacehaven & Telscombe	Peacehaven	The Sports Park	3,000
Saltdean United	Brighton (Saltdean)	Hill Park	1,000
Shoreham	Shoreham-by-Sea	Middle Road	2,000
Steyning Town	Steyning	The Shooting Field	2,000

== Division One ==
Division One was increased to 18 clubs from 17, 14 of which competed from the previous season

=== Team changes ===
To Division One

Promoted from Division Two

- Copthorne

Relegated from the Premier Division

- Alfold
- Roffey

Relegated from the Combined Counties Football League Premier Division South

- Banstead Athletic

From Division One

Promoted to the Premier Division

- Shoreham

Promoted to the Combined Counties Football League Premier Division South

- Epsom & Ewell

Relegated to Division Two

- Hailsham Town

=== League table ===
Southern Combination League Division One
- Season: 2023–24
- Dates: 5 August 2023 –
- Champions: Roffey
- Promoted: Roffey; Wick
- Matches: 306
- Goals: 1,176 (3.84 per match)
- Top goalscorer: Tyler Capon (34 goals)
- Biggest home win: Dorking Wanderers B 7–0 Forest Row (9 March 2024)
- Biggest away win: East Preston 0–7 Roffey (2 September 2023)
- Highest scoring: Montpelier Villa 7–4 Copthorne (13 January 2024)
- Longest winning run: 10 matches Roffey
- Longest unbeaten run: 13 matches Roffey; Wick
- Longest losing run: 17 matches Oakwood
- Highest attendance: 327; Selsey 2–2 Roffey (28 October 2023)
- Lowest attendance: 10; Oakwood 1–2 East Preston (11 November 2023)
- Total attendance: 22,297
- Average attendance: 75.3

Pos	Team	Pld	W	D	L	GF	GA	GD	Pts	Promotion, qualification or relegation
1	Roffey (C, P)	34	24	7	3	110	30	+80	79	Promotion to the Premier Division
2	Seaford Town	34	22	2	10	96	54	+42	68	Qualified for the play-offs
3	Dorking Wanderers B	34	20	5	9	82	41	+41	65	Ineligible for promotion (Note: Dorking Wanderers B are not permitted to take part in the play-offs as reserve sides cannot compete above Step 6.)
4	Wick (O, P)	34	18	9	7	78	54	+24	63	Qualified for the play-offs, then promoted to Premier Division
5	Worthing United	34	18	8	8	69	42	+27	62	Qualified for the play-offs
6	Selsey	34	17	8	9	56	52	+4	59	Qualified for the play-offs
7	Chessington & Hook United	34	15	12	7	66	54	+12	57	
8	Arundel	34	16	7	11	62	47	+15	52 (Note: Deducted 3 points - ineligible player.)	
9	Godalming Town	34	12	13	9	56	45	+11	49	
10	Montpelier Villa	34	11	9	14	67	74	−7	42	
11	Copthorne	34	11	4	19	70	109	−39	37	
12	Billingshurst	34	10	6	18	70	83	−13	36	
13	Banstead Athletic	34	9	8	17	51	69	−18	35	
14	Forest Row	34	10	3	21	58	85	−27	33	
15	Alfold	34	9	6	19	51	92	−41	33	
16	Mile Oak	34	8	7	19	48	81	−33	31	
17	East Preston	34	8	4	22	47	90	−43	28	
18	Oakwood	34	8	2	24	39	74	−35	26	Reprieved from relegation

Source: The FA Full-Time Division 1 Table
Rules for classification: 1) points; 2) goal difference; 3) number of goals scored; 4) number of matches won; 5) head-to-head results
(C) Champions; (O) Play-off winners; (P) Promoted

=== Play-offs ===
Semi-finals
2	Seaford Town	3
6	Selsey	1
4	Wick	3(4)
5	Worthing United	3(3)

Final
2	Seaford Town	3(4)
4	Wick	3(5)

==== Semi-finals ====
30 April 2024	Seaford Town	3–1	Selsey	Seaford
19:30 GMT	Capon 1'; Connor 11'; Knight 57'	Report	Harris 78'	Stadium: The Crouch; Attendance: 379; Referee: Mark Spence

30 April 2024	Wick	3–3 (4–3 p)	Worthing United	Littlehampton (Wick)
20:00 GMT	Bingham 21'; Barratt 62'; Irish 90'	Report	Kingston 20'; Appleton 22'; Sherwood 81'	Stadium: Crabtree Park; Attendance: 308; Referee: Marc Meeten

==== Final ====
4 May 2024	Seaford Town	3–3 (4–5 p)	Wick	Seaford
15:00 GMT	Connor 15', 26'; Capon 38'	Report	Crouch 5', 60'; Irish 57'	Stadium: The Crouch; Attendance: 931; Referee: Perry Hart

=== Results table ===
Home \ Away	ALF	ARU	BAN	BIL	CHU	COP	DOR	EPR	FOR	GOD	MOK	MON	OAK	ROF	SEA	SEL	WIC	WOR
Alfold		2–4	1–3	3–3	2–2	0–3	0–4	3–1	0–2	4–4	3–2	1–3	2–0	0–5	1–5	1–0	3–1	1–3
Arundel	1–0		2–1	1–1	1–0	3–1	1–2	3–1	4–0	1–2	4–0	2–1	5–1	1–1	1–4	1–1	1–2	0–0
Banstead Athletic	1–1	3–4		2–2	0–1	3–3	1–3	2–2	2–2	0–1	1–2	2–0	1–0	1–1	1–2	2–0	1–3	0–1
Billingshurst	3–1	2–1	3–4		0–1	4–0	1–2	2–2	6–4	1–4	4–0	5–0	6–0	1–5	2–3	0–5	1–3	3–4
Chessington & Hook United	5–0	1–1	2–1	5–2		4–3	5–0	3–2	0–3	2–1	2–1	3–3	1–0	2–2	4–3	1–1	1–1	2–2
Copthorne	2–2	2–7	3–5	4–3	0–3		1–1	5–0	3–1	1–4	4–2	3–6	2–1	2–7	2–5	2–1	2–4	3–2
Dorking Wanderers B	5–1	2–2	4–2	4–1	5–1	3–0		3–0	7–0	1–1	4–1	0–2	0–2	1–1	4–1	3–1	3–0	1–2
East Preston	3–0	2–1	4–0	2–1	2–4	0–3	2–1		5–4	0–2	2–2	1–3	0–2	0–7	0–5	2–3	1–1	1–6
Forest Row	2–3	1–2	4–1	3–1	2–1	1–2	3–0	3–2		0–1	6–3	1–3	0–2	1–2	0–3	0–2	1–4	1–5
Godalming Town	1–1	1–1	2–1	0–2	0–0	7–2	1–1	0–1	0–2		2–2	2–0	3–0	0–2	2–0	0–0	2–2	1–1
Mile Oak	1–4	1–2	1–2	4–0	0–0	1–0	0–1	2–1	0–4	1–1		0–3	3–1	0–3	2–2	2–3	2–3	3–2
Montpelier Villa	3–4	2–1	1–1	2–3	2–2	7–4	1–3	4–3	0–0	2–2	1–2		3–1	1–4	2–4	2–0	2–2	0–2
Oakwood	1–3	2–1	1–3	1–2	2–1	0–2	0–6	1–2	4–0	2–2	1–2	2–2		1–3	2–3	1–2	0–2	0–1
Roffey	6–0	4–0	5–0	0–0	6–0	5–0	2–1	3–1	3–1	1–2	5–3	4–0	1–2		2–0	5–0	2–3	2–0
Seaford Town	3–2	1–2	3–0	4–1	3–3	7–1	1–4	3–1	6–2	2–1	3–2	4–1	3–1	0–2		1–2	3–1	1–2
Selsey	4–0	2–0	1–1	3–2	1–4	1–1	1–0	2–0	4–3	4–3	1–1	2–1	3–1	2–2	1–0		3–2	2–2
Wick	5–2	1–0	1–3	2–2	0–0	5–1	2–0	1–0	3–0	3–1	6–0	3–3	2–1	4–4	2–4	1–0		1–3
Worthing United	1–0	0–1	3–0	4–0	2–0	4–3	1–3	5–1	1–1	2–0	0–0	1–1	2–3	0–3	0–2	3–0	2–2	

Source: The FA Full-Time SCFL Division One
Legend: Blue = home team win; Yellow = draw; Red = away team win.

=== Results by matchday ===
Matchday	1	2	3	4	5	6	7	8	9	10	11	12	13	14	15	16	17	18	19	20	21	22	23	24	25	26	27	28	29	30	31	32	33	34
Alfold	L	D	L	W	L	L	W	W	W	L	L	W	L	L	L	W	W	D	L	D	W	L	L	D	W	L	L	L	L	L	D	D	L	L
Arundel	L	D	W	W	L	D	L	W	W	L	D	W	D	W	W	W	L	L	D	L	W	W	D	L	W	W	W	W	D	L	W	L	W	L
Banstead Athletic	L	D	W	L	W	L	L	L	W	L	W	W	W	L	D	D	L	L	L	D	L	L	D	D	L	L	D	W	L	L	D	W	W	L
Billingshurst	L	L	D	L	W	W	L	L	L	L	W	D	L	D	L	L	L	D	D	W	L	L	W	W	L	L	W	W	W	L	W	L	L	D
Chessington & Hook United	W	D	W	L	L	D	W	W	L	W	D	W	W	D	D	D	D	L	L	D	W	W	L	D	D	L	W	D	D	W	W	W	W	W
Copthorne	L	D	L	L	L	W	L	L	W	W	L	D	L	W	L	L	L	W	D	L	W	L	L	L	W	W	W	L	L	L	D	W	L	W
Dorking Wanderers B	L	D	W	W	W	W	W	W	D	W	W	L	W	W	D	D	W	W	L	W	W	L	L	W	L	L	W	W	L	W	W	D	L	W
East Preston	L	L	L	L	L	L	L	L	L	D	W	L	D	W	W	L	L	D	L	L	W	W	W	L	L	D	L	L	L	W	L	W	L	W
Forest Row	W	W	L	W	W	L	L	L	L	W	W	L	L	D	L	D	W	L	W	W	D	L	L	L	L	L	L	W	L	L	L	L	L	L
Godalming Town	D	W	W	L	W	W	D	W	W	W	L	L	W	D	D	L	L	L	L	W	D	W	D	W	D	D	D	D	D	L	D	L	D	L
Mile Oak	L	D	L	L	D	L	W	L	L	D	W	L	D	D	W	W	L	L	W	D	L	L	L	L	D	W	L	W	L	L	L	W	L	L
Montpelier Villa	W	D	W	W	L	L	L	W	L	W	W	L	W	L	D	L	W	D	L	L	L	W	W	D	L	D	L	W	D	D	L	D	L	D
Oakwood	W	W	L	L	L	L	L	L	L	L	L	L	L	L	L	L	L	L	L	W	L	L	W	L	L	L	L	L	W	W	L	D	W	D
Roffey	D	L	W	W	W	W	W	W	W	W	W	W	D	W	L	W	W	W	D	L	W	W	W	W	W	W	D	W	D	W	D	D	W	W
Seaford Town	W	W	L	W	W	L	W	W	W	L	W	L	W	L	W	D	W	W	L	W	D	L	L	W	W	W	W	W	W	W	W	L	W	W
Selsey	D	D	W	L	W	W	L	L	W	L	D	W	D	W	D	W	W	W	D	L	W	W	W	L	W	D	L	W	D	L	W	L	W	W
Wick	D	D	L	W	W	W	L	W	L	L	L	D	W	W	W	W	W	W	W	D	W	D	W	D	L	W	D	W	D	W	W	W	L	D
Worthing United	W	D	W	W	D	W	L	W	W	W	D	D	L	L	W	W	L	W	W	D	W	W	W	W	L	W	D	D	L	L	W	D	L	W

Source: The FA Full-Time SCFL Division One
W = Win; D = Draw; L = Loss

=== Top scorers ===
Rank	Player	Club	Goals
1	Tyler Capon	Seaford Town	34
2	Devon Jordan Fender	Roffey	25
2	Joshua Irish	Wick	25
4	David Peter Crouch	Wick	24
5	Maurice Black	Chessington & Hook United	21
6	Oliver Rawlins	Dorking Wanderers B	19
7	Callum Connor	Seaford Town	17
7	George Cousins	Roffey	17
7	Lui Edwards	Banstead Athletic	17
10	Sam Bull	Arundel (previously Copthorne)	15

=== Stadia and locations ===
Map showing the location of teams in Division 1

Team	Location	Stadium	Capacity
Alfold	Alfold Crossways	Alfold Recreation Ground	1,000
Arundel	Arundel	Mill Road	2,200
Banstead Athletic	Tadworth	Merland Rise	1,500
Billingshurst	Billingshurst	Jubilee Fields	—
Chessington & Hook United	Chessington	Chalky Lane	3,000
Copthorne	Copthorne	Camping World Community Stadium (groundshare with Horsham)	1,300
Dorking Wanderers B	Dorking	Meadowbank	3,000
East Preston	Littlehampton (East Preston)	The Lashmar	1,000
Forest Row	Crawley (Three Bridges)	Tinsley Lane (groundshare with Oakwood)	—
Godalming Town	Godalming	Bill Kyte Stadium	3,000
Mile Oak	Brighton (Mile Oak)	Mile Oak Recreation Ground	—
Montpelier Villa	Lancing	Culver Road (groundshare with Lancing)	1,500
Oakwood	Crawley (Three Bridges)	Tinsley Lane	—
Roffey	Horsham (Roffey)	Bartholomew Way	1,000
Seaford Town	Seaford	The Crouch	—
Selsey	Selsey	Bunn Leisure Stadium	—
Wick	Littlehampton (Wick)	Crabtree Park	2,000
Worthing United	Worthing (Broadwater)	The Robert Albon Memorial Ground	1,504

== Division Two ==
Division Two reduced by one to 13 teams.

=== Team changes ===
To Division Two

Relegated from Division One

- Hailsham Town

From Division Two

Promoted to Division One

- Copthorne

Left League

- Charlwood
- Worthing Town (Withdrew from league with effect from 9 September 2023)

Southern Combination League Division Two
- Season: 2023–24
- Dates: 19 August 2023 - 04 May 2024
- Champions: Storrington
- Matches: 262
- Goals: 528 (2.02 per match)
- Top goalscorer: Ashley Harris (20 goals)
- Biggest home win: Bosham 9–1 Brighton Electricity (13 January 2024)
- Biggest away win: Brighton Electricity 0–9 Storrington (26 August 2023); Brighton Electricity 0–9 Capel (9 September 2023)
- Highest scoring: Bosham 9–1 Brighton Electricity (13 January 2024)
- Longest winning run: 7 matches Storrington
- Longest unbeaten run: 9 matches Bosham
- Longest losing run: 7 matches Brighton Electricity; Rottingdean
- Highest attendance: 232; Bosham 1–1 Jarvis Brook (28 October 2023)
- Lowest attendance: 10; Rottingdean Village 1–6 Upper Beeding (25 November 2023)
- Total attendance: 7,164
- Average attendance: 64.0

Promotion from this division depended on ground grading as well as league position.

=== League table ===
Pos	Team	Pld	W	D	L	GF	GA	GD	Pts	Promotion
1	Storrington (C, P)	22	18	2	2	69	28	+41	56	Promoted to Division One
2	Bosham	22	14	3	5	67	36	+31	45	
3	Ferring	22	13	4	5	58	37	+21	43	
4	Jarvis Brook	22	11	7	4	56	27	+29	40	
5	Hailsham Town	22	11	6	5	45	28	+17	39	
6	Rustington	22	10	5	7	47	38	+9	35	
7	Southwater	22	9	4	9	42	37	+5	31	
8	Capel	22	9	3	10	39	41	−2	30	
9	St Francis Rangers	22	6	4	12	35	40	−5	22	
10	Upper Beeding	22	4	5	13	34	48	−14	17	
11	Brighton Electricity	22	2	2	18	16	102	−86	8	
12	Rottingdean Village	22	1	3	18	20	66	−46	6	Resigned from the league

Source: The FA Full-Time SCFL Division 2 Table
Rules for classification: 1) points; 2) goal difference; 3) number of goals scored.
(C) Champions; (P) Promoted

=== Results table ===
Home \ Away	BOS	BRE	CAP	FER	HAI	JAR	ROT	RUS	SOU	STF	STO	UBD
Bosham		9–1	2–4	3–2	4–2	1–1	6–2	0–0	4–2	3–1	4–1	2–2
Brighton Electricity	0–4		0–9	1–7	0–5	1–4	2–2	2–4	2–1	0–4	0–9	0–2
Capel	0–4	1–1		1–1	1–3	3–2	2–1	3–1	1–1	2–1	1–4	1–0
Ferring	5–1	6–2	3–1		1–4	1–1	3–3	2–3	5–0	2–1	1–0	3–2
Hailsham Town	3–5	5–0	H/W	1–1		2–2	H/W	1–2	2–0	1–1	2–2	1–1
Jarvis Brook	1–0	7–0	4–0	3–0	1–3		3–2	2–2	3–0	0–2	1–3	2–2
Rottingdean Village	0–5	0–1	0–3	1–3	1–3	1–3		0–2	1–3	0–5	0–3	1–6
Rustington	2–5	6–1	3–2	1–2	1–1	0–0	2–1		1–1	2–4	1–4	5–0
Southwater	4–1	4–2	2–0	1–2	1–0	0–5	8–1	2–0		0–0	1–2	1–1
St Francis Rangers	1–2	2–0	0–1	1–2	0–1	2–5	2–2	2–4	1–5		1–3	1–1
Storrington	2–0	6–0	5–1	5–4	3–2	1–1	1–0	2–1	3–2	3–1		4–3
Upper Beeding	0–2	5–0	3–2	1–2	1–3	1–5	0–1	1–4	0–3	1–2	1–3	

Source: SCFL Fixtures and Results
Legend: Blue = home team win; Yellow = draw; Red = away team win.

=== Results by matchday ===
Matchday	1	2	3	4	5	6	7	8	9	10	11	12	13	14	15	16	17	18	19	20	21	22
Bosham	L	W	D	L	W	W	W	W	L	D	W	W	W	W	W	W	D	W	L	W	L	W
Brighton Electricity	L	W	L	L	L	L	L	L	L	D	L	D	L	L	W	L	L	L	L	L	L	L
Capel	D	W	W	L	L	L	W	W	L	D	W	L	L	L	L	L	W	D	W	W	L	W
Ferring	W	L	W	L	W	W	L	W	W	W	D	D	W	W	L	W	L	D	W	W	W	D
Hailsham Town	L	W	D	D	L	W	W	W	W	L	W	W	W	D	D	L	W	W	D	W	W	D
Jarvis Brook	W	W	D	W	W	D	W	L	D	D	W	L	L	W	W	D	W	W	D	W	D	L
Rottingdean Village	L	L	L	W	L	L	L	L	L	L	L	D	L	D	L	L	D	L	L	L	L	L
Rustington	W	D	W	D	L	W	D	L	L	W	W	D	L	L	W	D	W	W	W	W	L	L
Southwater	L	W	D	L	W	W	D	W	D	W	W	L	L	W	L	L	D	L	L	W	L	W
St Francis Rangers	W	W	L	L	W	L	W	L	L	L	W	D	D	D	L	D	W	L	L	L	L	L
Storrington	W	W	D	W	L	W	W	W	W	W	W	W	L	W	W	W	W	W	W	W	D	W
Upper Beeding	L	L	L	L	D	L	L	W	L	W	D	L	L	L	L	D	D	W	L	L	D	L

Updated to match(es) played on 04 May 2024. Source: The FA Full-Time SCFL Division 2
W = Win; D = Draw; L = Loss

=== Top scorers ===
As of 04 May 2024

Rank	Player	Club	Goals
1	Ashley Harris	Bosham	20
2	Chris Darwin	Rustington	15
3	Matthew Wilson	Storrington	14
4	Matthew Hards	Storrington	12
5	Alfred Barnes	St Francis Rangers	11
6	Sean Culley	Rustington	10
6	Toby Hewett	Bosham	10
	Luke Brodie	Southwater	10
	Harry Gardner	Ferring	10
	Shaun Kenward	Ferring	10

=== Stadia and locations ===
Map showing the location of teams in Division 2

Team	Location	Stadium	Capacity
Bosham	Bosham	Walton Lane	—
Brighton Electricity	Brighton (Withdean)	Withdean Stadium (groundshare with AFC Varndeanians)	8,850
Capel	Capel	Newdigate Road	—
Ferring	Ferring	The Glebelands	—
Hailsham Town	Hailsham	The Beaconsfield	2,000
Jarvis Brook	Crowborough	Limekiln	—
Rottingdean Village	Brighton (Rottingdean)	Rottingdean Sports Centre	—
Rustington	Rustington	Rustington Recreation Ground	—
Southwater	Southwater	Southwater Sports Club	—
St Francis Rangers	Haywards Heath	Colwell Ground	1000
Storrington	Storrington	The Recreation Ground, Storrington	—
Upper Beeding	Upper Beeding	Memorial Playing Field	—

== Peter Bentley League Challenge Cup ==
The 2023–24 SCFL Peter Bentley Challenge Cup saw Newhaven enter the competition as defending champions, having defeated Crowborough Athletic in the previous season's final.

=== Calendar ===
Round	Dates	Matches	Clubs
First round	15 August	6	38 → 32
Second round	19 August to 10 October	16	32 → 16
Third round	21 October to 6 March	8	16 → 8
Quarter-finals	13 February to 16 April	4	8 → 4
Semi-finals	24 April to 7 May	2	4 → 2
Final	11 May	1	2 → 1

=== First round ===
Tie	Home team (tier)	Score	Away team (tier)	Att.
1	Alfold (FD)	2–2 (4–2 p)	Forest Row (FD)	47
2	Selsey (FD)	2–1	Worthing United (FD)	108
3	Godalming Town (FD)	1–1 (2–4 p)	Chessington & Hook United (FD)	129
4	Oakwood (FD)	4–0	Copthorne (FD)	45
5	East Preston (FD)	1–6	Arundel (FD)	47
6	Billingshurst (FD)	1–2	Mile Oak (FD)	51

=== Second round ===
Tie	Home team (tier)	Score	Away team (tier)	Att.
1	Saltdean United (PD)	1–2	AFC Uckfield Town (PD)	87
2	Steyning Town (PD)	5–1	Lingfield (FD)	82
3	Newhaven (PD)	3–0	Eastbourne Town (PD)	224
4	Shoreham (PD)	0–2	Pagham (PD)	
5	Loxwood (PD)	3–4	Midhurst & Easebourne (PD)	55
6	Alfold (FD)	2–2 (2–4 p)	Dorking Wanderers B (FD)	46
7	Selsey (FD)	1–5	Hassocks (PD)	121
8	Wick (FD)	1–3	Haywards Heath Town (PD)	79
9	Seaford Town (FD)	3–2	Eastbourne United Association (PD)	74
10	Crowborough Athletic (PD)	0–0 (4-2 p)	Peacehaven & Telscombe (PD)	
11	Horsham YMCA (PD)	0–2	Crawley Down Gatwick (PD)	61
12	Little Common (PD)	3–2	Bexhill United (PD)	273
13	Chessington & Hook United (FD)	2–0	Oakwood (FD)	81
14	Arundel (FD)	3–2	AFC Varndeanians (PD)	52
15	Mile Oak (FD)	1–1 (4–2 p)	Montpelier Villa (FD)	40
16	Bansteas Athletic (FD)	0–3	Roffey (FD)	21

=== Third round ===
Tie	Home team (tier)	Score	Away team (tier)	Att.
1	AFC Uckfield Town (PD)	0–6	Steyning Town (PD)	76
2	Newhaven (PD)	6–0	Pagham (PD)	102
3	Midhurst & Easebourne (PD)	3–3 (5–4 p)	Dorking Wanderers B (FD)	41
4	Hassocks (PD)	2–2 (4–5 p)	Haywards Heath Town (PD)	202
5	Seaford Town (FD)	1–4	Crowborough Athletic (PD)	
6	Crawley Down Gatwick (PD)	1–2	Little Common (PD)	38
7	Chessington & Hook United (FD)	H–W	Arundel (FD)	
8	Mile Oak (FD)	1–4	Roffey (FD)	60

=== Quarter-finals ===
Tie	Home team (tier)	Score	Away team (tier)	Att.
1	Steyning Town (PD)	3–1	Newhaven (PD)	162
2	Midhurst & Easebourne (PD)	0–2	Haywards Heath Town (PD)	106
3	Crowborough Athletic (PD)	2–0	Little Common (PD)	223
4	Chessington & Hook United (FD)	1–0	Roffey (FD)	56

- Haywards Heath fielded an illegible player and were expelled from the competition.

=== Semi-finals ===
Tie	Home team (tier)	Score	Away team (tier)	Att.
1	Steyning Town (PD)	5-0	Midhurst & Easebourne (PD)	
2	Crowborough Athletic (PD)	6–2	Chessington & Hook United (FD)	

=== Final ===
11 May 2024	Steyning Town (PD)	2–1	Crowborough Athletic (PD)	Hassocks
15:00	66' Sam Remfry; 90+4' Charlie Towning	Report	41' Leo Vowles	Stadium: The Beacon; Referee: Simon Faires
