= 2018–19 Southern Combination Football League =

The 2018–19 Southern Combination Football League season was the 94th in the history of the competition, which lies at levels 9 and 10 of the English football league system.

The provisional club allocations for steps 5 and 6 were announced by the FA on 25 May.

== Premier Division ==
Southern Combination League Premier Division
- Season: 2018–19
- Dates: 4 August 2018 – 27 April 2019
- Champions: Chichester City
- Relegated: Arundel; Shoreham
- Matches: 380
- Goals: 1,335 (3.51 per match)
- Top goalscorer: Lee Robinson (45 goals)
- Biggest home win: Chichester City 7–0 Lingfield (29 September 2018); Eastbourne Town 7–0 Shoreham (15 December 2018)
- Biggest away win: Hassocks 0–6 Chichester City (7 August 2018); Loxwood 1–7 Pagham (21 August 2018); Eastbourne United 1–7 East Preston (9 September 2018)
- Highest scoring: Lancing 8–4 Little Common (29 September 2018)
- Longest winning run: 10 matches Chichester City
- Longest unbeaten run: 22 matches Chichester City
- Longest losing run: 11 matches Eastbourne United AFC
- Highest attendance: 856; Eastbourne Town 5–0 Eastbourne United AFC (26 December 2018)
- Lowest attendance: 21; AFC Uckfield 1–2 Saltdean United (2 April 2019)
- Average attendance: 93

The Premier Division consisted of 20 clubs, the same as last season, after Worthing United and Littlehampton Town were relegated to Division One, and Haywards Heath Town and Three Bridges were promoted to Isthmian League Division One South.

Four clubs joined the division:

- Langney Wanderers – promoted from Division One
- Lingfield – promoted from Division One
- Little Common – promoted from Division One
- Shoreham – relegated from Isthmian League Division One South

=== League table ===
Pos	Team	Pld	W	D	L	GF	GA	GD	Pts	Promotion or relegation
1	Chichester City	38	30	4	4	107	34	+73	94	Promoted to the Isthmian League South East Division
2	Horsham YMCA	38	27	4	7	95	45	+50	85	
3	Eastbourne Town	38	26	5	7	99	50	+49	83	
4	Newhaven	38	25	8	5	87	38	+49	83	
5	Saltdean United	38	21	8	9	77	54	+23	71	
6	Broadbridge Heath	38	19	9	10	78	46	+32	66	
7	AFC Uckfield Town	38	19	5	14	89	63	+26	62	
8	Lingfield	38	18	5	15	60	61	−1	59	
9	Crawley Down Gatwick	38	16	9	13	70	62	+8	57	
10	Peacehaven & Telscombe	38	17	6	15	67	68	−1	57	
11	Pagham	38	11	12	15	61	65	−4	45	
12	Hassocks	38	12	8	18	63	85	−22	44	
13	Lancing	38	12	7	19	58	77	−19	43	
14	East Preston	38	11	8	19	50	64	−14	41	
15	Langney Wanderers	38	9	10	19	47	77	−30	37	
16	Little Common	38	9	8	21	52	82	−30	35	
17	Loxwood	38	9	4	25	55	89	−34	31	
18	Eastbourne United	38	8	3	27	37	88	−51	27	
19	Arundel	38	6	9	23	50	104	−54	27	Relegated to Division One
20	Shoreham	38	6	6	26	33	83	−50	24	Relegated to Division One

Source: scfl.org.uk
Rules for classification: 1) Points; 2) Goal difference; 3) Number of goals scored; 4) Number of matches won; 5) Head-to-head results

=== Results table ===
Home \ Away	UCK	ARU	BBH	CCH	CDG	EBT	EBU	EPR	HSK	HYM	LAN	LAW	LIN	LCM	LOX	NEW	PAG	PAT	SDU	SHO
AFC Uckfield Town		7–2	6–1	0–1	1–4	2–1	4–1	1–0	4–0	3–4	4–2	4–3	4–1	2–0	1–1	0–3	3–4	1–2	1–2	1–0
Arundel	0–5		0–6	2–5	0–0	2–3	3–2	1–2	1–3	2–5	3–1	0–0	0–3	1–4	1–3	1–3	0–0	5–2	2–3	3–0
Broadbridge Heath	2–3	1–1		1–2	5–4	2–2	2–0	2–1	6–0	0–3	0–1	6–0	5–4	3–0	5–0	1–3	0–0	3–1	0–1	4–0
Chichester City	1–0	6–1	0–0		3–0	1–2	1–0	3–2	3–3	2–1	4–1	2–0	7–0	5–1	4–2	2–0	5–0	6–1	1–1	2–0
Crawley Down Gatwick	3–1	3–2	1–1	1–5		2–1	2–0	1–1	2–5	0–3	1–2	3–0	0–0	3–3	3–0	0–2	1–1	5–0	4–4	3–2
Eastbourne Town	4–2	3–0	3–2	4–1	4–1		5–0	0–0	2–1	1–4	5–3	2–1	2–1	5–1	2–1	3–4	3–0	3–1	3–1	7–0
Eastbourne United Association	1–4	1–1	0–0	0–3	1–2	1–3		1–7	0–2	0–4	0–1	1–2	1–3	2–0	2–1	1–2	0–0	2–1	1–3	1–2
East Preston	3–3	1–3	1–2	0–4	0–1	1–1	2–3		2–2	0–3	2–2	2–1	0–1	1–0	4–1	0–5	2–2	2–0	1–0	3–0
Hassocks	1–2	0–2	1–1	0–6	1–2	0–2	3–0	1–0		5–3	3–1	2–2	3–2	1–1	3–3	1–2	4–0	0–4	1–4	0–5
Horsham YMCA	4–3	4–1	0–1	0–1	3–1	5–1	2–0	2–0	2–1		2–0	2–1	1–1	5–3	3–0	0–0	1–0	4–1	3–3	0–1
Lancing	0–3	4–3	0–4	0–1	0–1	1–3	3–1	1–1	2–2	2–4		4–1	1–3	8–4	1–0	1–3	0–4	1–1	2–0	1–0
Langney Wanderers	1–3	1–1	0–1	2–3	1–0	2–2	3–1	2–0	2–2	0–2	0–0		1–3	1–4	0–1	1–2	2–1	1–1	2–2	2–2
Lingfield	1–0	4–1	3–1	1–3	0–4	1–0	2–4	5–0	1–0	2–3	1–0	0–3		3–2	0–1	0–3	2–2	1–2	2–0	2–1
Little Common	1–0	0–0	0–3	0–2	1–0	0–1	4–0	1–0	4–2	2–3	1–3	0–0	1–1		1–4	1–1	4–1	2–5	0–2	2–2
Loxwood	1–3	7–3	1–2	0–2	1–1	1–3	5–1	0–1	0–4	2–3	0–2	2–3	0–1	3–0		2–1	1–7	1–3	2–3	2–3
Newhaven	1–1	6–0	0–0	3–2	4–3	1–2	3–1	2–4	0–1	1–1	1–0	4–0	0–0	3–0	3–1		2–2	4–2	2–1	4–1
Pagham	2–4	0–0	0–0	1–2	0–2	0–5	2–3	0–4	5–2	1–0	3–0	6–0	2–1	2–2	6–0	1–3		1–1	0–2	2–1
Peacehaven & Telscombe	3–1	2–1	1–2	1–1	2–1	2–2	H/W (Note: Peacehaven & Telscombe v Eastbourne United (27 August 2018) was declared a home walkover after Eastbourne United were unable to raise a team. It is posted on the official site as home win 0-0.)	4–0	3–1	0–2	3–2	1–2	0–2	1–0	1–0	1–1	2–3		1–3	4–1
Saltdean United	2–2	3–0	3–2	2–0	2–2	0–3	0–1	2–0	4–1	3–2	3–3	4–1	3–1	3–0	1–1	0–1	1–0	1–5		3–0
Shoreham	0–0	1–1	0–1	1–5	0–3	2–1	1–3	1–0	0–1	0–2	2–2	1–3	0–1	0–2	1–4	0–4	0–0	0–2	1–2	

Source: SCFL Fixtures and Results
Legend: Blue = home team win; Yellow = draw; Red = away team win.

=== Results by matchday ===
Matchday	1	2	3	4	5	6	7	8	9	10	11	12	13	14	15	16	17	18	19	20	21	22	23	24	25	26	27	28	29	30	31	32	33	34	35	36	37	38
AFC Uckfield Town	L	D	D	W	W	W	L	L	D	L	W	L	L	W	W	W	L	W	D	W	W	W	W	W	L	W	L	W	L	L	W	D	L	W	L	L	W	W
Arundel	D	D	D	L	D	L	D	W	W	L	L	L	D	L	L	L	L	D	L	L	L	W	L	L	W	L	D	L	D	L	L	L	W	L	L	L	W	L
Broadbridge Heath	D	L	W	D	W	D	W	W	L	L	L	W	L	D	W	W	W	W	L	L	W	W	D	D	W	L	L	W	D	W	W	D	D	W	W	L	W	W
Chichester City	W	W	W	D	W	W	W	L	W	W	L	W	W	L	W	W	W	W	D	W	W	W	W	D	W	W	D	W	W	W	W	W	W	W	W	W	W	L
Crawley Down Gatwick	D	D	D	W	L	D	L	L	W	W	W	W	L	D	W	W	W	L	L	W	W	D	L	W	W	L	W	D	L	D	L	W	L	W	W	D	L	L
Eastbourne Town	D	W	L	L	L	W	L	W	L	W	W	L	W	D	W	W	W	W	D	W	D	W	W	W	W	W	W	W	L	W	W	D	W	W	W	W	W	W
Eastbourne United Association	D	L	L	L	L	L	L	L	L	L	L	L	L	D	L	L	W	L	L	W	D	L	W	L	L	W	W	L	L	L	W	L	L	W	L	L	L	W
East Preston	D	L	W	D	L	W	D	L	W	W	L	W	W	D	L	L	L	W	D	L	W	L	L	D	L	L	L	W	L	L	D	L	L	D	L	W	L	W
Hassocks	D	L	L	W	L	W	D	W	D	L	L	L	L	L	W	L	L	D	W	W	W	W	L	W	L	L	D	W	D	L	W	W	D	L	L	L	D	L
Horsham YMCA	W	W	L	W	W	W	W	W	L	W	W	L	W	W	W	W	W	D	L	W	L	L	L	W	D	D	W	W	W	W	W	W	W	D	W	W	W	W
Lancing	W	L	L	D	D	L	L	W	W	D	W	L	L	W	L	L	L	W	W	L	L	W	L	L	L	D	W	D	W	L	L	L	W	W	L	D	D	L
Langney Wanderers	D	L	D	D	L	D	L	W	D	L	W	D	L	L	L	W	L	L	L	D	D	D	L	L	L	W	L	W	L	W	W	W	D	L	L	W	L	L
Lingfield	D	L	L	W	W	D	L	W	L	W	D	W	W	L	L	L	W	W	W	W	W	L	W	W	L	W	D	L	L	W	D	W	L	W	L	L	L	W
Little Common	W	W	L	L	D	L	L	L	L	L	W	W	D	D	L	L	L	L	D	L	L	D	L	D	L	L	D	D	W	L	L	L	L	L	W	W	W	W
Loxwood	L	L	D	L	L	L	L	L	L	W	L	L	L	L	D	W	W	L	W	L	L	L	L	W	L	D	W	W	W	L	L	L	L	W	L	D	L	L
Newhaven	L	D	W	W	W	W	W	D	W	L	W	W	W	W	W	W	D	W	W	W	W	W	W	D	L	W	L	L	W	D	W	D	D	W	W	W	D	W
Pagham	W	W	D	W	D	D	W	D	W	W	D	W	D	D	W	L	L	W	L	D	D	D	D	L	W	L	L	W	D	L	L	L	L	L	L	L	L	L
Peacehaven & Telscombe	L	W	W	D	W	L	W	L	W	L	L	W	D	W	L	W	W	W	L	L	D	W	L	L	L	D	D	L	W	W	W	W	L	L	W	L	D	W
Saltdean United	D	W	W	W	W	D	W	W	L	D	W	L	W	D	W	L	W	W	W	L	D	L	L	D	D	W	W	L	W	L	W	W	W	W	W	D	W	L
Shoreham	L	W	W	L	D	L	D	L	D	L	L	W	W	D	L	L	L	L	L	L	L	L	W	D	D	L	L	L	L	L	L	L	L	L	L	W	L	L

Source: SCFL
W = Win; D = Draw; L = Loss

=== Top scorers ===
Rank	Player	Club	Goals
1	Lee Robinson	Newhaven	45
2	Daniel Perry	Eastbourne Town	25
3	Scott Jones	Chichester City	24
3	Philip Johnson	Hassocks	24
5	Dean Bown	Horsham YMCA	23
6	Matthew Maclean	AFC Uckfield Town	19
7	Leslie Oliver	Crawley Down Gatwick	18
7	Matthew Daniel	Lancing	18
9	Benjamin Gray	Arundel	17
9	Josh Clack	Chichester City	17
9	Samuel Clements	Lingfield	17
9	Jamie Brotherton	Saltdean United	17

=== Stadia and locations ===
Map showing the location of teams in the Premier Division

Team	Location	Stadium	Capacity	Founded
AFC Uckfield Town	Framfield	The Oaks	1,000	2014
Arundel	Arundel	Mill Road	2,200	1889
Broadbridge Heath	Broadbridge Heath	Broadbridge Heath Leisure Centre	1,000	1919
Chichester City	Chichester	Countrywide Gas Stadium	2,000	2000
Crawley Down Gatwick	Crawley Down	The Haven Centre	1,000	1993
Eastbourne Town	Eastbourne	The Saffrons	3,000	1881
Eastbourne United	Eastbourne	The Oval	2,000	2003
East Preston	Littlehampton (East Preston)	The Lashmar	2,000	1966
Hassocks	Hassocks	The Beacon	1,500	1902
Horsham YMCA	Horsham	Gorings Mead	1,575	1898
Lancing	Lancing	Culver Road	1,500	1941
Langney Wanderers	Eastbourne (Langney)	Priory Lane (groundshare with Eastbourne Borough (Note: Langney unable to play at Shinewater Lane as the ground doesn't meet league requirements.)	4,151	2010
Lingfield	Lingfield	The Sports Pavilion	2,000	1893
Little Common	Eastbourne	The Oval (groundshare with Eastbourne United ) (Note: Little Common unable to play at The Recreation Ground (Bexhill) as the ground doesn't meet league requirements.)	2,000	1966
Loxwood	Loxwood	Plaistow Road	1,000	1920
Newhaven	Newhaven	The Trafalgar Ground	3,000	1889
Pagham	Pagham	Nyetimber Lane	1,500	1903
Peacehaven & Telscombe	Peacehaven	The Sports Park	3,000	1923
Saltdean United	Brighton (Saltdean)	Hill Park	1,000	1966
Shoreham	Shoreham-by-Sea	Middle Road	2,000	1892

== Division One ==
Southern Combination League Division One
- Season: 2018–19
- Dates: 4 August 2018 – 27 April 2019
- Champions: Alfold
- Promoted: Alford, Steyning Town
- Relegated: Worthing United
- Matches: 306
- Goals: 1,123 (3.67 per match)
- Top goalscorer: Matt Waterman (26 goals)
- Biggest home win: Alfold 10–0 Midhurst & Easebourne (15 December 2018)
- Biggest away win: Worthing United 1–8 Bexhill United (22 September 2018)
- Highest scoring: Oakwood 6–5 Midhurst & Easebourne (25 August 2018); Oakwood 7–4 Worthing United (19 January 2019)
- Longest winning run: 8 matches Alfold
- Longest unbeaten run: 24 matches Alfold
- Longest losing run: 10 matches Southwick

Division One remained at 18 clubs after Little Common, Langney Wanderers and Lingfield were promoted to the Premier Division, and Ringmer left the league. Four new clubs joined:

- Alfold – promoted from Division Two
- Littlehampton Town – relegated from the Premier Division
- Sidlesham – promoted from Division Two
- Worthing United – relegated from the Premier Division

=== League table ===
Pos	Team	Pld	W	D	L	GF	GA	GD	Pts	Promotion or relegation
1	Alfold	32	25	5	2	92	32	+60	80	Promoted to the Premier Division
2	Steyning Town	32	24	5	3	78	24	+54	77	Promoted to the Premier Division
3	AFC Varndeanians	32	22	5	5	82	38	+44	71	
4	Bexhill United	32	22	4	6	92	29	+63	70	
5	Selsey	32	20	6	6	63	25	+38	66	
6	Littlehampton Town	32	14	5	13	78	67	+11	47	
7	Mile Oak	32	14	4	14	59	53	+6	46	
8	Hailsham Town	32	10	10	12	62	61	+1	40	
9	Wick	32	12	4	16	55	78	−23	40	
10	Sidlesham	32	11	4	17	40	57	−17	37	
11	Seaford Town	32	10	6	16	54	74	−20	36	
12	Billingshurst	32	10	5	17	58	88	−30	35	
13	Southwick	32	10	1	21	40	72	−32	31	
14	Storrington	32	8	5	19	47	82	−35	29	
15	Oakwood	32	7	5	20	58	94	−36	26	
16	Midhurst & Easebourne	32	7	4	21	47	81	−34	25	
17	Worthing United	32	5	4	23	44	94	−50	19	Reprieved from relegation
18	St Francis Rangers	0	0	0	0	0	0	0	0 (Note: St Francis Rangers resigned from the league in December 2018 and their playing record of P15 W2 D1 L12 GF13 GA61 Pts7 was expunged.)	Resigned from the league

Source: http://www.scfl.org.uk/pages/tables.html
Rules for classification: 1) Points; 2) Goal difference; 3) Number of goals scored; 4) Number of matches won; 5) Head-to-head results

=== Results table ===
Home \ Away	VAR	ALF	BEX	BIL	HAI	LIT	MDE	MOK	OAK	SEA	SEL	SID	SWK	STF	STT	STO	WIC	WRH
AFC Varndeanians		2–2	1–0	3–1	4–1	4–3	2–1	3–1	3–0	1–2	2–0	3–0	3–1		0–1	4–1	4–0	0–0
Alfold	2–0		1–0	6–0	0–0	4–3	10–0	1–1	4–0	2–1	2–0	2–0	3–1		2–1	3–0	5–3	4–1
Bexhill United	1–1	0–1		6–0	5–1	2–1	4–0	2–1	2–1	4–3	3–3	3–1	3–0		0–1	3–2	1–0	4–0
Billingshurst	4–4	2–3	1–2		3–1	4–2	1–5	2–1	4–2	2–1	0–2	1–2	4–2		2–5	6–1	3–1	1–3
Hailsham Town	5–4	1–3	0–2	0–0		0–3	H/W (Note: Hailsham Town v Midhurst & Easebourne (8 December 2018) was declared a home walkover after Midhurst & Easebourne were unable to raise a team. It is posted on the official site as home win 0-0.)	6–0	4–2	2–2	2–2	1–1	2–0		1–2	4–4	1–1	4–2
Littlehampton Town	2–2	1–7	0–1	7–2	3–2		0–0	1–1	6–2	5–0	1–2	2–3	5–1		0–2	2–2	3–1	2–1
Midhurst & Easebourne	1–3	4–1	1–1	3–4	0–4	1–2		1–2	1–4	2–3	2–3	1–1	1–2		0–4	2–1	0–3	2–1
Mile Oak	1–5	1–4	2–1	3–0	1–0	7–0	4–1		2–3	5–3	0–1	2–2	1–0		1–2	0–1	4–1	0–2
Oakwood	2–3	1–1	1–6	2–3	2–1	3–1	6–5	2–6		2–2	1–3	5–2	0–1		0–3	2–2	3–5	7–4
Seaford Town	1–4	0–3	1–7	1–1	1–1	4–1	3–3	2–0	3–1		0–2	1–0	0–3		0–1	3–1	2–3	4–2
Selsey	0–1	1–2	1–0	6–0	2–2	1–1	0–1	3–0	2–0	0–0		3–0	0–2		0–0	4–0	3–1	3–0
Sidlesham	1–3	0–2	0–2	2–1	4–2	3–5	1–0	1–2	1–0	2–4	0–1		0–0		1–4	3–1	3–1	2–0
Southwick	0–4	0–2	0–4	4–1	0–3	2–4	2–1	0–1	3–2	1–2	0–2	0–1			1–2	4–5	2–0	3–2
St Francis Rangers																		
Steyning Town	0–1	3–3	2–2	2–0	3–2	1–0	1–0	0–0	4–0	4–0	0–1	1–0	7–2			2–2	3–1	4–1
Storrington	0–2	1–2	1–7	1–0	1–3	1–4	1–3	2–0	6–1	2–1	0–3	1–0	1–2		0–4		1–2	3–1
Wick	3–2	4–3	0–6	2–2	1–3	1–7	5–2	1–3	0–0	3–1	1–3	3–1	2–1		1–5	1–1		3–0
Worthing United	1–4	0–2	1–8	3–3	3–3	0–1	2–3	0–6	1–1	4–3	1–6	0–2	4–0		0–4	4–1	0–1	

Source: SCFL Fixtures and Results
Legend: Blue = home team win; Yellow = draw; Red = away team win.

=== Results by matchday ===
Matchday	1	2	3	4	5	6	7	8	9	10	11	12	13	14	15	16	17	18	19	20	21	22	23	24	25	26	27	28	29	30	31	32
AFC Varndeanians	W	W	W	W	D	W	W	W	W	W	L	W	D	W	L	L	L	W	D	W	L	D	W	W	W	W	W	W	D	W	W	W
Alfold	W	W	L	W	D	W	W	L	W	D	W	W	W	W	W	W	W	W	D	W	W	W	D	W	W	W	D	W	W	W	W	W
Bexhill United	L	W	W	L	W	W	W	D	W	W	W	W	W	L	W	W	W	W	L	D	W	W	W	L	W	W	W	W	D	D	W	L
Billingshurst	L	L	L	L	D	L	W	W	L	L	D	W	D	W	L	W	W	W	W	L	L	L	L	D	L	W	L	L	D	L	L	W
Hailsham Town	W	D	W	W	W	D	D	L	W	D	D	L	L	W	W	L	W	L	L	W	D	L	D	D	W	L	D	L	L	D	L	L
Littlehampton Town	W	W	W	L	W	L	L	L	D	W	W	L	L	D	W	W	L	W	D	W	D	L	W	W	L	D	W	L	W	L	W	L
Midhurst & Easebourne	L	L	W	L	W	L	L	L	L	L	L	W	D	L	L	L	L	L	L	W	L	D	L	W	L	L	D	L	L	D	W	W
Mile Oak	W	L	L	L	L	L	W	L	D	L	L	L	W	L	D	W	L	W	D	W	L	W	W	L	W	L	D	W	W	W	W	W
Oakwood	L	D	D	W	L	L	L	W	L	D	L	L	W	L	W	L	L	L	W	D	W	W	L	D	L	L	L	L	L	L	L	L
Seaford Town	W	L	D	L	W	D	W	W	D	W	D	W	L	L	W	W	L	L	L	D	L	L	D	L	L	W	L	W	L	L	L	L
Selsey	L	L	W	W	W	D	D	D	L	W	W	L	W	W	L	W	W	D	W	D	W	W	W	D	L	W	W	W	W	W	W	W
Sidlesham	L	W	L	W	D	L	L	W	L	L	W	D	L	L	W	L	W	W	D	W	L	W	L	L	W	L	D	L	W	L	L	L
Southwick	W	L	L	L	D	L	L	W	L	W	L	W	L	L	L	L	L	L	L	L	L	L	W	W	L	W	W	L	L	W	L	W
Steyning Town	W	W	L	W	W	W	L	W	W	W	W	W	W	W	D	W	W	W	D	W	W	D	W	W	W	D	L	W	W	D	W	W
Storrington	L	L	D	W	L	W	L	W	D	L	L	W	L	L	D	L	W	L	L	L	D	L	W	W	L	D	W	L	L	L	L	L
Wick	W	W	L	L	W	W	W	L	W	L	L	L	L	D	W	L	L	W	L	W	L	W	D	L	D	W	L	L	L	D	L	W
Worthing United	L	D	L	L	W	L	L	L	L	L	W	L	D	L	L	L	W	L	L	L	L	L	D	L	D	L	L	W	W	L	L	L

Source: SCFL
W = Win; D = Draw; L = Loss

=== Top scorers ===
Rank	Player	Club	Goals
1	Matt Waterman	AFC Vardeanians	29
2	Kelvin Lucas	Alfold	24
2	Jack Shonk	Bexhill United	24
4	Scott Taylor	Hailsham Town	22
5	Joao Andrade	Alfold	18
5	Nicholas Tilley	Billingshurst	18
7	Alexander Rainford	Seaford Town	17
8	Johden De Meyer	Alfold	16
9	Jack Langford	Littlehampton Town	15

=== Stadia and locations ===
Map showing the location of teams in Division 1

Team	Location	Stadium	Capacity	Founded
AFC Varndeanians	Brighton (Withdean)	Withdean Stadium (groundshare with Brighton Electricity)	8,850	1929
Alfold	Alfold Crossways	Alfold Recreation Ground	—	1923
Bexhill United	Bexhill-on-Sea	The Polegrove	—	2002
Billingshurst	Billingshurst	Jubilee Fields	—	1891
Hailsham Town	Hailsham	The Beaconsfield	2,000	1885
Littlehampton Town	Littlehampton	St Flora Sportsfield (groundshare with Littlehampton United)	4,000	1896
Midhurst & Easebourne	Easebourne	Rotherfield	—	1946
Mile Oak	Brighton (Mile Oak)	Mile Oak Recreation Ground	—	1960
Oakwood	Crawley (Three Bridges)	Tinsley Lane	—	1962
Seaford Town	Seaford	The Crouch	—	1888
Selsey	Selsey	Bunn Leisure Stadium	—	1903
Sidlesham	Sidlesham	The Recreation Ground, Sidlesham	—	1946
Southwick	Brighton (Southwick)	Old Barn Way	2,000	1882
St Francis Rangers	Haywards Heath	Colwell Ground	1,000	2002
Steyning Town	Steyning	The Shooting Field	—	1892
Storrington	Storrington	The Recreation Ground, Storrington	—	1883
Wick	Littlehampton (Wick)	Crabtree Park	2,000	1892
Worthing United	Worthing (Broadwater)	The Robert Albon Memorial Ground	1,504	1988

== Division Two ==
Southern Combination League Division Two
- Season: 2018–19
- Dates: 4 August 2018 – 27 April 2019
- Champions: Rustington
- Promoted: Roffey
- Matches: 210
- Goals: 972 (4.63 per match)
- Top goalscorer: Patrick O'Sullivan (48 goals)
- Biggest home win: Roffey 13–1 Ferring (1 September 2018)
- Biggest away win: Ferring 1–10 Angmering Seniors (24 November 2018)
- Highest scoring: Roffey 13–1 Ferring (1 September 2018)
- Longest winning run: 8 matches Rustington; Copthorne
- Longest unbeaten run: 26 matches Rustington
- Longest losing run: 17 matches Ferring

Division Two featured three new clubs after Alfold and Sidlesham were promoted to Division One, and Lancing United resigned from the league:

- Angmering Seniors – joined from the West Sussex League
- Brighton Electricity – joined from the Brighton, Worthing & District League
- Copthorne – joined from the Mid-Sussex League

Also, Clymping F.C. changed their name to Littlehampton United

Promotion from this division depends on ground grading as well as league position.

=== League table ===
Pos	Team	Pld	W	D	L	GF	GA	GD	Pts	Promotion
1	Rustington	28	23	4	1	112	33	+79	73	
2	Copthorne	28	19	3	6	82	40	+42	60	
3	Roffey	28	18	5	5	110	45	+65	59	Promoted to Division One
4	Angmering Seniors	28	16	1	11	78	64	+14	49	
5	Rottingdean Village	28	14	4	10	68	44	+24	46	
6	Jarvis Brook	28	13	4	11	76	62	+14	43	
7	Montpelier Villa	28	13	3	12	76	64	+12	42	
8	Worthing Town	28	13	1	14	62	62	0	40	
9	Westfield	28	12	2	14	49	59	−10	38	Transferred to the Mid-Sussex Football League
10	Bosham	28	11	3	14	50	67	−17	36	
11	Upper Beeding	28	9	7	12	46	50	−4	34	
12	Cowfold	28	11	1	16	49	74	−25	34	
13	Littlehampton United	28	7	4	17	49	86	−37	25	
14	Brighton Electricity	28	6	4	18	33	95	−62	22	
15	Ferring	28	2	0	26	32	127	−95	6	

Source: http://www.scfl.org.uk/pages/tables.html
Rules for classification: 1) points; 2) goal difference; 3) number of goals scored.

=== Results table ===
Home \ Away	ANG	BOS	BRE	COP	COW	FER	JAR	LIT	MON	ROF	ROT	RUS	UBD	WES	WOR
Angmering Seniors		2–0	6–1	3–2	2–4	3–1	7–2	2–0	4–7	1–3	5–3	0–4	4–0	2–3	3–1
Bosham	2–1		3–1	1–3	1–4	5–3	5–3	5–2	2–1	1–2	1–0	1–5	1–1	1–2	2–3
Brighton Electricity	2–4	2–2		0–4	1–0	2–1	2–1	2–2	0–9	0–5	1–4	4–8	1–1	1–2	2–1
Copthorne	4–2	2–1	2–1		3–1	5–0	1–5	6–1	1–1	5–4	3–0	0–0	4–1	1–2	5–1
Cowfold	0–0	2–0	3–0	2–0		3–1	0–6	5–3	2–4	2–5	2–5	2–5	0–3	4–2	2–0
Ferring	1–10	2–3	3–1	1–4	1–2		0–2	0–4	0–6	2–4	0–5	0–7	1–6	2–5	1–5
Jarvis Brook	7–2	5–0	6–1	5–3	0–1	9–4		0–0	3–2	3–2	1–1	0–5	0–0	4–1	2–3
Littlehampton United	0–1	3–3	1–1	0–4	3–1	6–0	3–1		3–1	0–4	2–4	0–3	0–2	2–0	5–1
Montpelier Villa	0–3	0–2	6–0	0–4	7–1	3–1	2–3	4–3		1–6	2–2	2–7	3–0	3–0	3–5
Roffey	6–0	2–1	9–0	2–3	4–2	13–1	3–1	6–0	6–1		1–1	1–4	2–2	6–1	3–3
Rottingdean Village	2–3	2–1	6–0	4–2	3–1	1–3	H/W (Note: Rottingdean Village v Jarvis Brook (15 December 2018) was declared a home walkover after Jarvis Brook were unable to raise a team.It is posted on the official site as home win 0-0.)	11–1	0–1	2–2		2–4	0–3	0–1	2–0
Rustington	4–1	10–0	2–1	0–0	4–1	4–1	7–2	7–0	1–1	4–2	2–1		3–2	2–2	0–3
Upper Beeding	1–3	1–4	2–0	0–3	1–0	3–0	1–1	6–1	2–3	1–1	0–3	3–5		4–2	0–2
Westfield	1–2	2–0	1–3	2–5	4–0	1–0	1–3	3–2	2–1	1–3	1–2	1–3	0–0		5–1
Worthing Town	3–2	1–2	1–3	0–3	6–2	5–2	5–1	3–2	1–2	2–3	1–2	0–2	3–0	2–1	

Source: SCFL Fixtures and Results
Legend: Blue = home team win; Yellow = draw; Red = away team win.

=== Results by matchday ===
Matchday	1	2	3	4	5	6	7	8	9	10	11	12	13	14	15	16	17	18	19	20	21	22	23	24	25	26	27	28
Angmering Seniors	W	W	W	W	W	W	L	W	W	W	W	W	W	L	W	L	L	L	W	L	L	W	D	L	W	L	L	L
Bosham	L	L	L	L	W	L	L	D	D	W	L	L	L	W	W	W	W	W	D	L	W	L	W	L	W	W	L	L
Brighton Electricity	L	L	L	L	L	L	W	W	D	L	L	L	L	L	L	L	L	D	L	L	L	W	W	D	L	L	W	D
Copthorne	W	L	W	D	W	D	L	W	L	L	W	W	W	W	W	L	W	W	W	W	W	W	W	W	L	W	D	W
Cowfold	L	W	W	W	W	W	W	W	W	L	L	L	L	L	L	L	L	L	L	L	W	L	L	L	L	W	W	D
Ferring	L	L	L	L	L	W	L	L	L	L	L	L	L	L	L	L	L	L	L	L	L	L	L	W	L	L	L	L
Jarvis Brook	D	W	W	L	L	D	L	W	W	D	L	L	L	W	L	W	W	W	W	W	L	L	W	W	L	W	L	D
Littlehampton United	D	W	L	W	L	W	L	D	D	W	W	L	L	L	L	W	L	W	L	L	L	D	L	L	L	L	L	L
Montpelier Villa	L	L	L	L	L	D	D	L	W	W	W	L	L	W	W	W	L	W	L	W	W	W	L	W	D	L	W	W
Roffey	W	W	D	W	W	L	D	W	L	W	D	W	D	W	L	D	W	W	W	L	W	W	L	W	W	W	W	W
Rottingdean Village	W	W	W	W	W	L	D	W	L	L	D	D	W	W	W	L	W	W	W	W	L	L	L	W	D	L	L	L
Rustington	W	W	W	D	W	W	D	W	W	W	W	W	W	W	W	D	W	W	W	W	W	W	D	W	W	W	W	L
Upper Beeding	L	L	D	L	W	L	D	D	L	W	W	W	D	W	W	D	L	L	L	L	W	L	L	W	D	W	D	L
Westfield	W	L	L	L	L	L	W	L	L	L	W	D	W	W	L	W	W	L	W	D	L	W	L	L	W	W	L	W
Worthing Town	L	L	W	W	L	W	L	W	L	D	W	W	L	L	L	L	L	W	L	L	W	L	W	L	W	L	W	W

Source: SCFL
W = Win; D = Draw; L = Loss

=== Top scorers ===
Rank	Player	Club	Goals
1	Patrick O'Sullivan	Roffey	48
2	Josh Irish	Rustington	47
3	Daryl King	Jarvis Brook	34
4	Ryan Walton	Montpelier Villa	25
5	Oscar Weddell	Copthorne	23
6	Bradley Stevens	Rottingdean Village	22
7	Christopher Darwin	Rustington	20
8	Marek Koutsavakis	Roffey	19
9	Alex Barnes	Bosham	15

=== Stadia and locations ===
Map showing the location of teams in Division 2

Team	Location	Stadium	Capacity	Founded
Angmering Seniors	Angmering	Decoy Drive	—	—
Bosham	Bosham	Walton Lane	—	1901
Brighton Electricity	Brighton (Withdean)	Withdean Stadium (groundshare with AFC Varndeanians)	8,850	1964
Copthorne	Copthorne	King Georges Field	—	2004
Cowfold	Cowfold	Cowfold Playing Field	—	1897
Ferring	Ferring	The Glebelands	—	1952
Jarvis Brook	Crowborough	Limekiln	—	1888
Littlehampton United	Littlehampton	St Flora Sportsfield (groundshare with Littlehampton Town)	4,000	1947
Montpelier Villa	Brighton (Falmer)	Sussex University	—	1991
Roffey	Horsham (Roffey)	Bartholomew Way	—	1901
Rottingdean Village	Brighton (Rottingdean)	Rottingdean Sports Centre	—	1989
Rustington	Rustington	Rustington Recreation Ground	—	1903
Upper Beeding	Upper Beeding	Memorial Playing Field	—	—
Westfield	Westfield	The Parish Field	200	1911
Worthing Town	Worthing	Palatine Park	—	1995

== Peter Bentley League Challenge Cup ==
Source SCFL Fixtures and Results

=== First round ===
11 August 2018	AFC Vardeanians	3–1	Seaford Town	Brighton
15:00		Report		Stadium: Withdean Stadium; Attendance: 33

11 August 2018	Alfold	6–2	Storrington	Alfold
15:00		Report		Stadium: Alfold Recreation Ground; Attendance: 58

11 August 2018	Oakwood	1–4	Midhurst & Easebourne	Crawley
15:00		Report		Stadium: Tinsley Lane; Attendance: 18

11 August 2018	Selsey	4–0	Billingshurst	Selsey
15:00		Report		Stadium: The Bunn Leisure Stadium; Attendance: 146

11 August 2018	Southwick	4–4 (a.e.t.) (3–4 p)	St Francis Rangers	Brighton
15:00		Report		Stadium: Old Barn Way; Attendance: 35

11 August 2018	Steyning Town	4–1	Sidlesham	Steyning
15:00		Report		Stadium: The Shooting Field; Attendance: 49

=== Second round ===
25 August 2018	Broadbridge Heath	1–2	Chichester City	Broadbridge Heath
15:00		Report		Stadium: Broadbridge Heath Leisure Centre; Attendance: 53

25 August 2018	Langney Wanderers	2–3	Peacehaven & Telscombe	Eastbourne
15:00		Report		Stadium: Priory Lane; Attendance: 75

4 September 2018	Arundel	2–1	Midhurst & Easebourne	Arundel
19:45		Report		Stadium: Mill Road; Attendance: 42

4 September 2018	Eastbourne Town	4–2	Hailsham Town	Eastbourne
19:45		Report		Stadium: The Saffrons; Attendance: 210

4 September 2018	Eastbourne United Association	0–6	AFC Uckfield Town	Eastbourne
19:45		Report		Stadium: The Oval; Attendance: 53

4 September 2018	Hassocks	3–2	Bexhill United	Hassocks
19:45		Report		Stadium: The Beacon; Attendance: 80

4 September 2018	Horsham YMCA	4–1	Lancing	Horsham
19:30		Report		Stadium: Gorings Mead; Attendance: 102

4 September 2018	Littlehampton Town	1–0	Wick	Littlehampton
19:30		Report		Stadium: St Flora Sportsfield; Attendance: 100

4 September 2018	Newhaven	7–0	Little Common	Newhaven
19:45		Report		Stadium: The Trafalgar Ground; Attendance: 82

4 September 2018	Pagham	6–3	East Preston	Pagham
19:30		Report		Stadium: Nyetimber Lane; Attendance: 96

4 September 2018	Shoreham	1–2	Lingfield	Shoreham-by-Sea
19:45		Report		Stadium: Middle Road; Attendance: 52

4 September 2018	Steyning Town	5–3	Worthing United	Steyning
19:45		Report		Stadium: The Shooting Field; Attendance: 64

10 September 2018	AFC Varndeanians	3–1 (Note: AFC Varndeanians were expelled for fielding an ineligible player. Mile Oak were reinstated and advanced to the third round.)	Mile Oak	Brighton
19:15		Report		Stadium: Withdean Stadium; Attendance: 38

15 September 2018	Loxwood	0–0 (a.e.t.) (3–2 p)	Alfold	Loxwood
15:00		Report		Stadium: Plaistow Road; Attendance: 63

18 September 2018	St Francis Rangers	0–7	Saltdean United	Haywards Heath
19:30		Report		Stadium: Colwell Ground; Attendance: 19

9 October 2018	Crawley Down Gatwick	3–2	Selsey	Crawley Down
19:30		Report		Stadium: The Haven Centre; Attendance: 48

=== Third round ===
13 October 2018	Hassocks	0–3	Lingfield	Hassocks
15:00		Report		Stadium: The Beacon; Attendance: 69

16 October 2018	AFC Uckfield Town	6–1	Loxwood	Framfield
19:30		Report		Stadium: The Oaks; Attendance: 17

16 October 2018	Arundel	1–2	Horsham YMCA	Arundel
19:45		Report		Stadium: Mill Road; Attendance: 41

16 October 2018	Newhaven	2–1	Crawley Down Gatwick	Newhaven
19:45		Report		Stadium: The Trafalgar Ground; Attendance: 79

16 October 2018	Pagham	0–0 (a.e.t.) (5–6 p)	Chichester City	Pagham
19:30		Report		Stadium: Nyetimber Lane; Attendance: 128

16 October 2018	Saltdean United	2–1	Eastbourne Town	Brighton
19:30		Report		Stadium: Hill Park; Attendance: 73

16 October 2018	Steyning Town	0–3	Peacehaven & Telscombe	Steyning
19:30		Report		Stadium: The Shooting Field; Attendance: 56

17 October 2018	Mile Oak	4–2	Littlehampton Town	Brighton
19:15		Report		Stadium: Mile Oak Recreation Ground; Attendance: 48

=== Quarter-finals ===
13 November 2018	Uckfield Town	3–1	Peacehaven & Telscombe	Framfield
19:30		Report		Stadium: The Oaks; Attendance: 28

13 November 2018	Chichester City	6–0	Mile Oak	Chichester
19:45		Report		Stadium: Countrywide Gas Stadium; Attendance: 42

13 November 2018	Lingfield	1–3	Horsham YMCA	Lingfield
19:45		Report		Stadium: Sports Pavilion; Attendance: 53

16 October 2018	Newhaven	2–2 (a.e.t.) (5–6 p)	Saltdean United	Newhaven
19:45		Report		Stadium: The Trafalgar Ground; Attendance: 81

=== Semi-finals ===
19 February 2019	Saltdean United	2–1	Chichester City	Steyning
19:30		Report		Stadium: The Shooting Field

20 February 2019	Horsham YMCA	2–3	AFC Uckfield Town	Shoreham-by-Sea
19:30		Report		Stadium: Middle Road

=== Final ===
6 May 2019	Saltdean United	3–1	AFC Uckfield Town	Hassocks
11:00				Stadium: The Beacon

== Division One Challenge Cup ==
Source SCFL Fixtures and Results

=== First round ===
9 October 2018	St Francis Rangers	0–1	Steyning Town	Haywards Heath
19:30		Report		Stadium: Colwell Ground; Attendance: 31

10 October 2018	Mile Oak	2–0	Sidlesham	Brighton
19:15		Report		Stadium: Mile Oak Recreation Ground; Attendance: 36

=== Second round ===
3 November 2018	Alfold	1–0	AFC Varndeanians	Alfold
15:00		Report		Stadium: Alfold Recreation Ground; Attendance: 45

3 November 2018	Hailsham Town	5–2	Billingshurst	Hailsham
15:00		Report		Stadium: The Beaconsfield; Attendance: 61

3 November 2018	Midhurst & Eastbourne	1–4	Seaford Town	Easebourne
15:00		Report		Stadium: Rotherfield; Attendance: 31

3 November 2018	Selsey	7–0	Oakwood	Selsey
15:00		Report		Stadium: The Bunn Leisure Stadium; Attendance: 97

3 November 2018	Storrington	1–2	Southwick	Storrington
15:00		Report		Stadium: Recreation Ground; Attendance: 40

3 November 2018	Worthing United	0–5	Bexhill United	Worthing
15:00		Report		Stadium: The Robert Albon Memorian; Attendance: 44

6 November 2018	Steyning Town	2–1	Littlehampton Town	Steyning
19:45		Report		Stadium: The Shooting Field; Attendance: 56

=== Third round ===
29 January 2019	Alfold	0–0 (Note: Bexhill United unable to raise a team. Alfold advanced to the next round.)	Bexhill United	Alfold
19:30		Report		Stadium: Alfold Recreation Ground

29 January 2019	Hailsham Town	3–1	Seaford Town	Hailsham
19:30		Report		Stadium: The Beaconsfield; Attendance: 68

19 February 2019	Southwick	0–2	Steyning Town	Brighton
19:45		Report		Stadium: Old Barn Way; Attendance: 45

19 February 2019	Wick	1–0	Selsey	Littlehampton
19:45		Report		Stadium: Crabtree Park; Attendance: 78

=== Semi-finals ===
19 March 2019	Wick	4–3	Hailsham Town	Steyning
19:30		Report		Stadium: The Shooting Field

26 March 2019	Steyning Town	1–0	Alfold	Arundel
19:30		Report		Stadium: Mill Road

=== Final ===
19 April 2019	Wick	0–4	Steyning Town	Littlehampton
11:00		Report		Stadium: Lashmar
