= Arthur Casswell =

English cricketer

Personal information
- Full name: Arthur Henry Seymour Casswell
- Born: 8 October 1892; Alford, Surrey, England
- Died: 29 October 1940 (aged 48); Tardebigge, Worcestershire, England
- Batting: Right-handed
- Bowling: Unknown-arm fast-medium

Career statistics
Competition	First-class
Matches	1
Runs scored	7
Batting average	7.00
100s/50s	–/–
Top score	7*
Balls bowled	36
Wickets	0
Bowling average	–
5 wickets in innings	–
10 wickets in match	–
Best bowling	–
Catches/stumpings	1/–
- Source: Cricinfo, 26 September 2019

Arthur Henry Seymour Casswell DSC (8 October 1892 – 29 October 1940) was an English first-class cricketer and an officer in the Royal Navy and the Royal Naval Air Service.
