= Copthorne F.C. =

Association football club in England

Coordinates: 51°02′49″N 0°20′26″W

Copthorne
- Full name: Copthorne Football Club
- Founded: 2004
- Ground: The Camping World Community Stadium, Hop Oast, Horsham
- Capacity: 1,300
- Chairman: Andrew Beadle
- Manager: Mark Pullers
- League: Southern Combination Division One
- 2024–25: Southern Combination Division One, 18th of 20
- Website: http://copthornefc.co.uk/
Home colours	Away colours

Copthorne Football Club is a football club based in Copthorne in West Sussex, England. They are currently members of the Southern Combination Division One and play at the Camping World Community Stadium in Horsham.

== History ==
The club was established in 2004. Becoming members of the Mid-Sussex League, they were Division Six champions in 2007–08. The won a treble in the 2009–10 season, winning Division Five, the Sommerville Challenge Cup and the Stratford Cup. Also winning Division Three the following season. And finishing second in Division Two in the 2011–12 season. They were promoted into the Premier Division at the end of the 2014–15 season after finishing third.

The club joined the Southern Combination Football League Division Two for the 2018–19 season, finishing 2nd but did not apply to enter step 6 in the English football league system pyramid. Applying for promotion into Division One in the 2021–22 season, the league declined due to the ground-grading, the club moved from King George's Field in Copthorne, and entered a groundshare agreement with Horsham for the 2022–23 in which they finished 2nd but gained promotion into Division One for the 2023–24 season.

== Ground ==
Copthorne play their home games at Horsham's Camping World Community Stadium, Hop Oast in Horsham, West Sussex.

Originally playing on King Georges playing fields in Copthorne, the club had a one-year groundshare agreement for the 2022–23 season whilst they were looking to find land for their own stadium.

== Honours ==
=== League ===
- Mid-Sussex League

Division One runners-up (1): 2012–13
Division Two runners-up (1): 2011–12
Division Three champions (1): 2010–11
Division Five champions (1): 2009–10
Division Six champions (1): 2007–08

- Southern Combination League

Division Two runners-up (2): 2018–19, 2022–23

=== Cups ===
- Division One Cup: 2023–24
- Sommerville Challenge Cup

Winners (1): 2009–10

- Stratford Cup

Winners (1): 2009–10

- Mid-Sussex Senior Charity Cup

Winners (1): 2015–16
