= Hassocks F.C. =

Association football club in England

Hassocks
- Full name: Hassocks Football Club
- Nickname: The Robins
- Founded: 1902
- Ground: The Beacon, Hassocks
- Coordinates: 50°55′11″N 0°9′2″W
- Chairman: Dave John / Patrick Harding
- Manager: James Westlake
- League: Southern Combination Premier Division
- 2025–26: Isthmian League South East Division, 19th of 22 (relegated)
- Website: https://hassocksfc.net/
Home colours	Away colours

Hassocks Football Club is a football club based in Hassocks, near Brighton, West Sussex, England. The club is affiliated to the Sussex County Football Association. The club joined the Sussex County League Division Two in 1981 and has reached the 2nd round of the FA Vase three times in its history, and the 3rd qualifying round of the FA Cup in 2001–02. They are currently members of the Southern Combination Premier Division and play at the Beacon.

The three sections together are a FA Charter Standard Community Club.

== History ==
Hassocks FC were founded in 1902, spending the first 80 years competing in the Mid-Sussex Football League and the Brighton, Hove & District Football League, mainly at Adastra Park. Ambitions for senior football were realised for the 1981–82 season when the club become members of Division 2 of the Sussex County League, finishing in 12th in their first season. Consolidation followed with regular placings in the top half of the division until the end of the 1986–87 season, when a change in the County League rules regarding ground grading saw the club demoted to Division 3 and a return to intermediate football.

1991 saw a change in chairman and management with Jim Goodrum elected chairman, Dave John coming in as general manager and the introduction of a new management team of Nick Greenwood and Pete Liddell in charge of First Team affairs. Results were immediate, the Division 3 title being won by 10 points in 1991–92. Critically, the return to senior football was matched by the progress off the pitch, with the club realising its ambitions to move to its own ground, The Beacon.

In 1994–95, the club won promotion to Division One of the County League but quality floodlights had to be provided. This was achieved through fund raising and a donation from Matthew Harding, who lived locally and whose sons Pat and Joel went on to become first team regulars. A game against Chelsea Youth in 1995 supported by Graham Rix and Liam Brady marked the official opening of the floodlights.

After their first season in Division One the club made its debut in the FA Vase, making it to the first round before being knocked out by Horsham. The following season the club then entered the FA Cup in the preliminary round, but losing to Egham Town at their first attempt. The club in the 2001–02 season achieved its best ever FA Cup run when they reached the Third Qualifying round when they were knocked out by Lewes 3–1 at The Dripping Pan.

In October 2002, an ex-Arsenal and Celebrity Team visited to help celebrate the centenary with Steve Williams, Peter Marinello, Terry Marsh, Martin Offiah and Ralf Little all gracing The Beacon.

Long-serving manager Dave John retired in 2008 to be replaced by former Horsham YMCA manager John Suter. Despite bringing in a number of the players with whom he had won promotion to the Isthmian League at Gorings Mead, the change did not work and Suter was dismissed after just 15 games in charge with the Robins floating around the relegation zone.

John returned to first team management and kept the side afloat for another two seasons, handing over the reigns to Mickey Jewell and his assistant former Steyning Town manager Mark Dalgleish for 2010–11, and in 2011–12 they led the Robins to a highest ever finish of 4th as well as the semi-finals of the Sussex RUR Cup.

The 2024–25 season saw Hassocks promoted as champions to step four for the first time in the club's history, a 3–0 win over Crowborough Athletic securing the title with five games to spare.

== Ground ==
Hassocks play their games at The Beacon Ground, Brighton Road, Hassocks, West Sussex, BN6 9LY.

The ground had floodlights installed in 1995.

The 2002–03 centenary season commenced with the completion of a new 237 seat stand in August 2002, named in honour of president Maurice Boxall. The official opening saw a Brighton and Hove Albion side play at the Beacon in what was Steve Coppell's first game in charge of the Seagulls.

In 2006 the building of a brand new clubhouse got underway and this was opened by Kate Hoey in June 2007, giving the Beacon some of the finest facilities in the County League which has resulted in the ground hosting numerous representative games.

== Current squad ==
Name	Nationality	Position	Date of birth (age)	Previous club
Goalkeepers
Josh Green	(England)	GK	16 September 1996 (age 30)	
Defenders
Quincey Broomfield	(England)	CB	17 May 1980	Block and Gasket FC (Sundays)
Derrick Jacques	(England)	CB	1 April 1975	North of the Wall
Rowan Wallis	(England)	CB		
Tom Barnes	(England)	CB		
Luke Akehurst	(England)	LB		
Ben Palmer	(England)	CB		St Francis Rangers
Brad Tighe	(England)	RB		
Harvey Blake	(England)	RB		Sporting Lindfield, Bolney Beavers
Midfielders
Mark Price	(England)	CM		
Spencer Slaughter	(England)	CM	19 November 1987 (age 38)	Burgess Hill
Josh Hawkes	(England)	CM		St Francis Rangers
Nathan Cooper	(England)	CM	18 June 1990 (age 36)	Three Bridges
James Westlake	(England)	RM		St Francis Rangers
Jamie Weston	(England)	LM	27 May 1988 (age 38)	St Francis Rangers
Elliott Butler	(England)	LM		St Francis Rangers
Jack Troak	(England)	LM	(28)	Eastbourne United
Strikers
Phil Gault	(England)	FW		St Francis Rangers
Nathan Miles	(England)	FW	27 July 1990 (age 36)	
Philip Johnson	(England)	FW	02/04/1990	Horsham YMCA
Liam Benson	(England)	FW		

== Honours ==
=== League honours ===
- Southern Combination Football League Premier Division
  - Champions (1): 2024–25
- Sussex County League Division Two
  - Runners-up (1): 1994–95
- Sussex County League Division Three
  - Champions (1): 1991–92
- Brighton, Hove & District Football League Division One
  - Champions (1): 1971–72
  - Runners-up (1): 1970–71
- Brighton, Hove & District Football League Division Two
  - Champions (1): 1965–66
- Brighton, Hove & District Football League Division Three
  - Runners-up (2): 1930–31, 1964–65

=== Cup honours ===
- Sussex County League Division Three League Cup
  - Runners-up (2): 1987–88, 1990–91
- The Peter Bentley Challenge Cup Winners (1): 2024-25

== Records ==
- Highest League Position: 1st in Southern Combination Premier Division 2024–25
- FA Cup best performance: Third qualifying round 2001–02
- FA Trophy best performance: First qualifying round 2025–26
- FA Vase best performance: Third Round 2026–27
