= Alfold F.C. =

Association football club in England

Coordinates: 51°06′28.9″N 0°31′01.2″W

Alfold
- Full name: Alfold Football Club
- Nickname: The Fold
- Founded: 1920
- Ground: The Recreation Ground, Alfold
- Chairman: Terry Eames
- Manager: John Penalver
- League: Southern Combination Division Two
- 2024–25: Southern Combination Division One, 20th of 20 (relegated)
Home colours	Away colours

Alfold Football Club is a football club based in Alfold, Surrey, England. They are currently members of the Southern Combination Division Two and play at the Recreation Ground.

== History ==
The club was established in 1920 as Loxwood and Alfold and joined the Rudgwick & District League. The club split in 1928 and Alfold joined the Cranleigh & District league, before becoming members of the Horsham & District League. They won the league title, the League Cup and the District Cup in 1953–54. When the league folded in the late 1960s, the club transferred to the West Sussex League. They won the Tony Kopp Cup in 1970–71 and were Division Two North champions 1980–81 and 1993–94, also winning the Surrey County Lower Junior Cup in 1988. The club won the Premier Division title in 2002–03 and the Chichester Charity Cup in 2010–11.

Alfold were Division Two runners-up in 2012–13, earning promotion to Division One. In 2015 they moved up to Division Two of the Southern Combination. A fourth-place finish in 2017–18 was enough to earn promotion to Division One. The following season saw the club win the Division One title, resulting in promotion to the Premier Division. In 2022–23 they finished second-from-bottom of the Premier Division and were relegated back to Division One. In 2024–25 the club finished bottom of Division One and were relegated to Division Two.

== Ground ==
The club play at the Recreation Ground in Dunsfold Road, Alfold. A new 50-seat stand and floodlights were installed in 2018.

== Honours ==
- Southern Combination
  - Division One champions 2018–19
- West Sussex League League
  - Premier Division champions 2002–03
  - Division Two North champions 1980–81, 1993–94
  - Tony Kopp Cup winners 1970–71
  - Chichester Charity Cup winners 2010–11
- Horsham & District League
  - Champions 1953–54
  - League Cup winners 1953–54
  - District Cup winners 1953–54

== Records ==
- Best FA Cup performance: Preliminary round, 2020–21
- Best FA Vase performance: Second qualifying round, 2020–21

== See also ==
- Alfold F.C. players
- Alfold F.C. managers
