= Steyning Town C.F.C. =

Association football club in England

Steyning Town
- Full name: Steyning Town Community Football Club
- Nickname: The Reds / Town / the Barrowmen
- Founded: 1892
- Ground: The Shooting Field, Steyning
- Coordinates: 50°53′32″N 0°19′41″W
- Chairman: Ian Nichols
- Manager: Brannon O’Neill
- League: Isthmian League South East Division
- 2025–26: Southern Combination Premier Division, 1st of 20 (promoted)
Home colours	Away colours

Steyning Town Community Football Club is a football club based in Steyning, West Sussex, England. The club is an FA Charter Standard community club, affiliated to the Sussex County Football Association. The club are currently members of the Isthmian League South East Division and play at the Shooting Field.

== History ==
The club was established in 1892, and were originally called Steyning. The club became founding members of the West Sussex Football League in 1896, joining the junior Division.

The club joined Division Two of the Brighton, Hove & District Football League for the 1919–20 season. The club remained in division two until the end of the 1933–34 season, when they finished as champions and gained promotion to Division one. The club spent three seasons in the top division of the league before being relegated, but they finished as champions two seasons later in the 1938–39 campaign, but were not promoted.

After the second World War, the club was still playing in Division Two of the Brighton & Hove league. The club remained in this division until the end of the 1951–52 campaign when they gained promotion to Division one. The 1963–64 campaign saw the club leave division one, when after finishing as runners-up, they gained promotion to Division two of the Sussex County League.

For the next 17 seasons Steyning stayed in Division Two of the Sussex County league, until they gained promotion as champions, to Division One at the end of the 1977–78 campaign. After their first season in Division one the club in 1979, they changed their name to their present one. The next season then saw the club make their debut in the FA Cup, where they met Sutton United, in the first qualifying round, but lost 3–1. In the 1984–85 season, they reached the Quarter Finals of the FA Vase, but managed to claim silverware when they won the Division One title for the first time. In the following seasons the club retained the league title and completed a treble by winning the Sussex Senior Challenge Cup and league cup.

After winning the Sussex league the club left the league, to become one of the founder members of the Wessex Football League in 1986. After just two seasons the club left the Wessex league and joined the Combined Counties Football League. At the end of their fifth season in the Combined counties league the club returned to the Sussex county league, but were placed in Division two.

The next four seasons saw the club remain in Division Two of the Sussex county league, until they finished bottom of the division and were relegated to Division three at the end of the 1996–97 campaign. At the fifth attempt the club managed to escape from Division three and return to Division two when they finished as runners up behind Pease Pottage Village at the end of the 2001–02 season. The club has since remained in Division Two of the Sussex county league.

In 2013, Steyning Town FC merged with the Steyning Strikers (Juniors) to become Steyning Town Community FC with 18 teams from men down to U7s and two girls teams.

In September 2016 the club was awarded Sussex FA's Community Club of the Year at a gala dinner at Brighton's Falmer stadium. The club also recently heard that it has also now won Sussex FA's Community Club of the Year again in 2017, and, once again, would be at a gala dinner at Brighton's Falmerstadium in September 2017.

The club were promoted to the Southern Combination Premier Division as Division One runners-up in the 2018–19 season. In their fifth season at the level, the club were crowned champions of the Premier Division, winning promotion to the Isthmian League South East Division. The following season, the club were immediately relegated back to step five. In their first season back in step five however, the club clinched the title on the final day of the season to earn promotion back to the Isthmian League.

== Ground ==
Steyning Town play their home games at the Shooting Field, Steyning, West Sussex, BN44 3RQ.

In October 2016, the club unveiled a new 3G pitch and refurbished clubhouse. The £450,000 development was funded by a local charitable trust, HSBC bank and other private investments.

== Honours ==
=== League honours ===
- Southern Combination Football League Premier Division:
  - Winners (2): 2023–24, 2025–26
- Southern Combination Football League Division One:
  - Runners-up (1): 2018–19
- Sussex County League Division One:
  - Winners (2): 1984–85, 1985–86
- Sussex County League Division Two:
  - Winners (1): 1977–78
- Sussex County League Division Three:
  - Runners-up (1): 2001–02
- West Sussex Football League Junior Division :
  - Runners-up (1): 1897–98
- Brighton, Hove & District Football League Division One:
  - Runners-up (1): 1963–64
- Brighton, Hove & District Football League Division Two:
  - Winners (2): 1933–34, 1938–39
  - Runners-up (1): 1924–25

=== Cup honours ===
- Sussex Senior Challenge Cup:
  - Winners (2): 1985–86, 1988–89
- The Sussex Royal Ulster Rifles Charity Cup
  - Winners (2): 1980–81, 1984–85
- Sussex County Football League John O'Hara League Cup:
  - Winners (3): 1978–79, 1983–84, 1985–86
  - Runners up (2): 1977–78, 1979–80, 1984–85
- Southern Combination Football League Division One Cup
  - Winners (1): 2018–19
- Sussex County Football League Division Two Cup:
  - Winners (1): 1965–66
  - Runners up (2): 1966–67, 2005–06
- Sussex County Football League Division Three Cup:
  - Runners up (1): 2000–01
- Sussex Junior Cup:
  - Winners (1): 1901–02
- Vernon Wentworth Cup:
  - Winners (1): 1933–34
- Peter Bentley Challenge Cup
  - Winners (1): 2025-26

== Records ==
- Highest League Position: 20th. Isthmian League South East Division, 2024-25
- FA Cup best performance: Second qualifying round, 1988–89, 2023–24, 2025–26
- FA Trophy best performance: First qualifying round, 2024–25
- FA Vase best performance: Quarter-finals, 1984–85
