= Alfold =

Village and parish in Surrey, England

Coordinates: 51°05′46″N 0°31′11″W

- Village
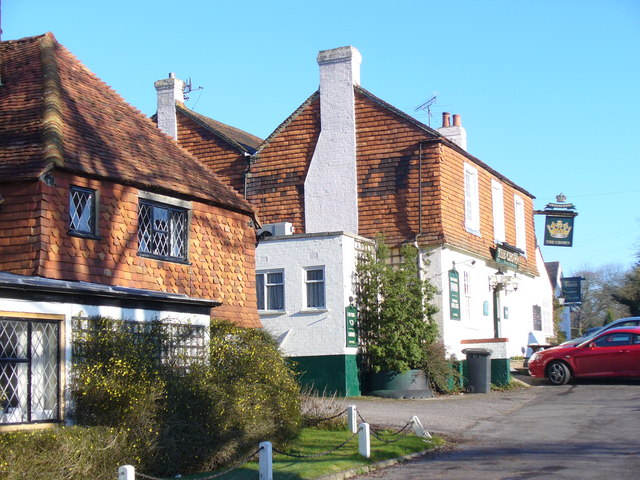
- Old tile-hung cottages and Crown Inn at the centre of Alfold

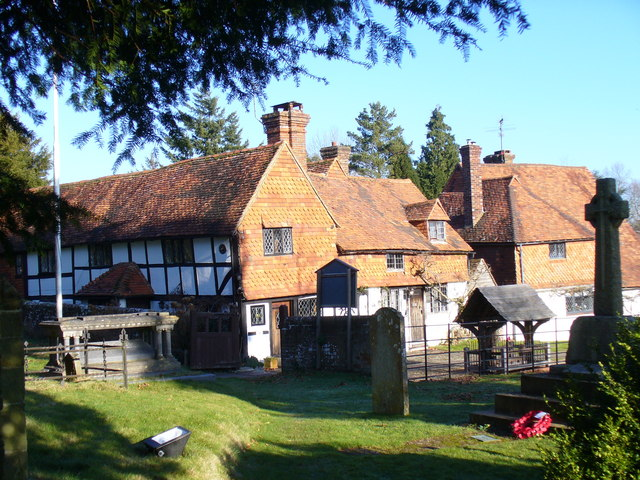
- Looking towards the stocks

- Location within Surrey
- Area: 15.1 km^{2} (5.8 sq mi)
- Population: 1,059 (Civil Parish)
  - Density: 70/km^{2} (180/sq mi)
- OS grid reference: TQ037341
- Civil parish: Alfold
- District: Waverley
- Shire county: Surrey
- Region: South East
- Country: England
- Sovereign state: United Kingdom
- Post town: CRANLEIGH
- Postcode district: GU6
- Dialling code: 01403
- Police: Surrey
- Fire: Surrey
- Ambulance: South East Coast
- UK Parliament: Godalming and Ash

Alfold is a village and civil parish in Surrey, England on the West Sussex border. Alfold is a dispersed or polyfocal village in the Green Belt, which is buffered from all other settlements. The Greensand Way runs north of the village along the Greensand Ridge and two named localities exist to the north and south of the historic village centre which features pubs, a set of stocks and a whipping post.

Alfold Crossways has a country park, recreational ground and a garden centre whereas Alfold's centre has a village store and the Anglican parish church. The population was 1,059 in the 2011 UK census.

== Etymology ==
Alfold—also recorded as Aldfold or Awfold—meant the "old fold" or clearing enclosure for cattle, which is apt as it was in a much-wooded area of The Weald (meaning forest in Old and Middle English) prior to being cleared for farming.

== History ==
Early glass making, evidence of which can be seen in Sidney Wood, appears to provide the oldest trace of land use in the village. The glass industry in Alfold ended around 1615 when using charcoal was banned in glass production. (Note: Malden states "In Sydney Wood were glass-houses, of which the only relic is the name Glass House Fields. A glasshouse is marked in Speed's map. Aubrey (17th century) saw the graves of French glass-makers in the churchyard, but the industry was extinct in his time, so the French were not refugees after the Revocation of the Edict of Nantes, as stated by Brayley.")

Alfold is not mentioned in Domesday Book. The earliest mention of Alfold, in the 13th century, records that it was attached to Shalford Manor. A charter of William Longespee, son of the Earl of Salisbury, records that the advowson, with the Manor of Shalford, is given to John, son of Geoffrey Earl of Essex, who died in 1256.

Four manors existed, namely Wildwood now represented by Great and Little Wildwood Farms and Wildwood Copse and Moat, was formerly possessed by the lords of Albury and Stoke D'Abernon, the D'Abernons and their successors. In the 13th century they had land in Alfold and in a deed of 1313 John D'Abernon's wood called le Wylwode is mentioned. Markwick and Monkenhook over their history have been held by Waverley Abbey, Viscount Montagu and the Earl of Onslow; and Sydney alias Hedgecourt or Rickhurst (Rykhurst) lies partly in Dunsfold held by the Sydney (then Dorrington) family.

Alfold Park, formerly with a moat (as did Wildwood Farm), belonged to the manor of Shalford and contained 300 acres (120 ha); however it lost its park before John Speed's map was made in the reign of James I.

After the invention of gunpowder, charcoal was extensively burnt in the parish for gunpowder works in Dunsfold, Cranleigh, and Sussex.

The parish comprised 2,726 acres (1,103 ha) of which only 72 acres (29 ha) in 1848 were common or waste, and

...abounded with oak, ash, and elm: in parts there is a bed of stone, which is used for repairing roads, but is not hard enough for building. The Arun and Wey Junction canal passes through. The living is a rectory, valued in the king's books at £6. 11. 2. [ land tax liability], and in the gift of the Sparkes family: the tithes have been commuted for £355, and the glebe comprises 14 acres.

A Baptist chapel was erected in 1883, and an elementary school in 1876.

Significant other homes mentioned in 1911 were Sydney Manor and Sachel Court; Sachel Court was owned by Thomas Smith Wharrie, an engineer in Scotland and director of British Mutual Banking Company Ltd. (Note: http://www.scottisharchitects.org.uk/architect_full.php?id=205835 Scottish Architects profile])

== Landmarks ==
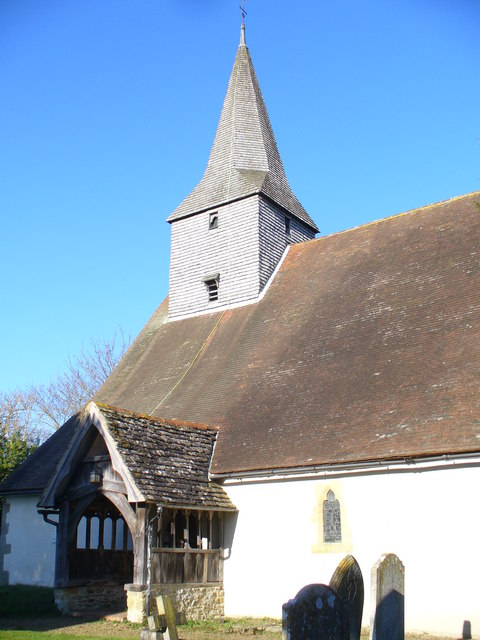
St Nicholas's Church

The compact village has a red telephone kiosk, stocks and whipping post with very old paving and the following listed buildings:

- St Nicholas's Church (Grade I)
- Alfold House (Grade II*)
- Alfold Stores/The Magnolias (Grade II*)
- Carrier/Cherry Tree cottages
- Rosemary Croft
- Church Cottage and Great Nicholas Church Room and
- Crown Cottage.

== Localities ==
=== Alfold Crossways ===
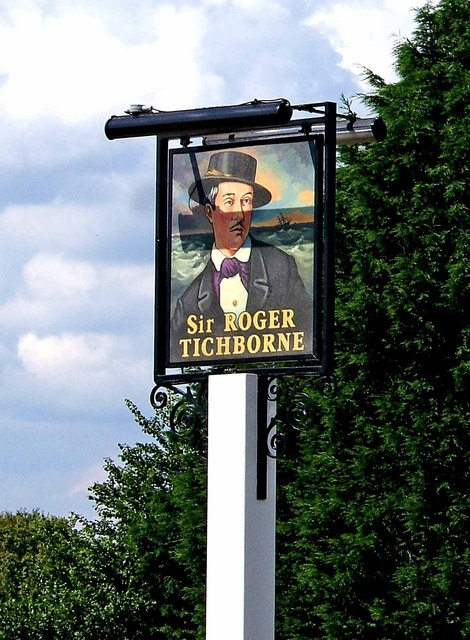
Sir Roger Tichborne pub, Alfold Bars

Also sometimes mistakenly recorded as Alford Crossways this hamlet or locality has more buildings in northern part of the village, around the crossroads of the A281 (Guildford-Horsham road) and the Arundel Road to the village centre. Here there are the following:

- Wildwood Country Park
- A Garden Centre
- A recreation ground
- Medieval moated site and associated pillow mound, Wildwood Copse, Scheduled Ancient Monument
- Orchard Cottage
- Waggoners Cottage
- Great Wildwood Farmhouse with Haybarn
- Caters Croft/Welby Cottage
- Little Pound/The Pound

=== Alfold Bars ===
This smaller also generally less old, southern part of the village has only one listed building, the Sir Roger Tichbourne Inn, see Tichborne baronets and Tichborne, Hampshire for Roger's family history. Alford Bars is situated just into West Sussex, with the county border at the north of the small area.

== Sport ==
The village's football club, Alfold F.C. play in the Southern Combination League.

== Demography and housing ==
2011 Census Homes
Output area	Detached	Semi-detached	Terraced	Flats and apartments	Caravans/temporary/mobile homes	shared between households
(Civil Parish)	185	131	28	44	52	9

The average level of accommodation in the region composed of detached houses was 28%, the average that was apartments was 22.6%.

2011 Census Key Statistics
Output area	Population	Households	% Owned outright	% Owned with a loan	hectares
(Civil Parish)	1,059	449	39.6%	28.1%	1510

The proportion of households in the civil parish who owned their home outright compares to the regional average of 35.1%. The proportion who owned their home with a loan compares to the regional average of 32.5%. The remaining % is made up of rented dwellings (plus a negligible % of households living rent-free).

== Notable people ==
- Arthur Casswell (1892–1940) – cricketer

== Notes and references ==
=== Notes ===
References
