= Montpelier Villa F.C. =

Association football club in England

Coordinates: 50°49′47.36″N 0°19′26.99″W

Montpelier Villa
- Full name: Montpelier Villa Football Club
- Nickname: Villains or The Villa
- Founded: 1991
- Ground: Culver Road, Lancing
- Chairman: Gary Pleece
- Manager: David Baker
- League: Mid-Sussex League Division Three South
- 2024–25: Southern Combination Division One, 19th of 20 (relegated)
Home colours	Away colours

Montpelier Villa F.C. is an English football club located in Falmer, Brighton in East Sussex. The club are currently members of the Mid-Sussex League Division Three South and play at Culver Road, Lancing.

== History ==
Montpelier Villa was established in 1991. Becoming members of the Brighton, Hove & District League where they won Division Six in their first season. After winning Division Four and the Hove and Worthing Cup in 1993–94 the club skipped a division and entered and won Division Two in 1994–95 and Division One in 1995–96. They were runners up in the Vernon Wentworth Cup in 2003–03. In 2009– 10 they were champions of the Premier Division and again in 2010–11.

Joining the Mid-Sussex Football League they rose though the leagues and finishing third in the Championship 2012–13 they were promoted into the Premier Division, finishing 8th in 2014–15 the club applied joined Division Two of the Southern Combination Football League.

The club finished fifth in the 2020–21, a season which was curtailed because of the COVID-19 pandemic, a supplementary shield was played and was won by the Villa. The club were promoted to Division One, entering step 6 of the English Football Pyramid for the first time. Montpelier Villa entered the FA Vase for the first time in 2021–22.

== Ground ==
Montpelier Villa play their home games at Culver Road, Lancing, West Sussex. The home of the Sussex County Football Association and Lancing.

== Honours ==
=== League honours ===
- Brighton, Hove & District League

Premier Division Winners (2): 2009–10, 2010–11
Division One Winners (1): 1995–96
Division Two Winners (1): 1994–95
Division Four Winners (1): 1993–94
Division Six Winners (1): 1991–92

=== Cup honours ===
- Hove & Worthing Cup

Winners (1): 1993–94

- Southern Combination League Division Two supplementary shield

Winners (1): 2021

- Vernon Wentworth Cup

Runners-up (1) 2002–03
