= Billingshurst F.C. =

Association football club in England

Coordinates: 51.026316°N 0.45865640°W

Billingshurst
- Full name: Billingshurst Football Club
- Nickname: Hurst
- Founded: 1891
- Ground: Jubilee Fields, Billingshurst
- Chairman: Kevin Tilley
- Manager: Lee Spickett
- League: Southern Combination Premier Division
- 2025–26: Southern Combination Division One, 3rd of 18 (promoted via play-offs)
Home colours	Away colours

Billingshurst Football Club is a football club based in Billingshurst, West Sussex, England. They are currently members of the Southern Combination Premier Division and play at Jubilee Fields.

== History ==
The club was established in 1891, and later joined the West Sussex League. They won the Division Two title in 1972–73 and went on to win Division One the following season. Following relegation the club won the Tony Kopp Cup and the Division Three North in 1979–80 and then Division Two North in 1982–83. They were Division Two North champions again in 1992–93, before winning Division Three Central in 1998–99 and Division Two North in 2006–07.

In 2010–11 Billingshurst won the Centenary Cup with a 2–1 victory over Newtown Villa in the final. After winning the Malcolm Simmonds Memorial Cup and the Premier Division title in 2011–12, the club moved up to Division Three of the Sussex County League, which was renamed Division Two when the league became the Southern Combination in 2015. In 2015–16 they finished fifth, earning promotion to Division One.

== Ground ==
The club moved to Jubilee Fields in 2006.

== Honours ==
- West Sussex League
  - Premier Division champions 2011–12
  - Division One champions 1973–74
  - Division Two champions 1972–73
  - Division Two North champions 1982–83, 1992–93, 2006–07
  - Division Three North champions 1979–80
  - Division Three Central champions 1998–99
  - Centenary Cup winners 2010–11
  - Malcolm Simmonds Memorial Cup winners 2011–12
  - Tony Kopp Cup winners 1979–80, 2002–03
- Chichester Charity Cup
  - Winners 1972–73, 1980–81

== Records ==
- Best FA Vase performance: First round, 2024–25
