= 2003–04 Sussex County Football League =

The 2003–04 Sussex County Football League season was the 79th in the history of Sussex County Football League a football competition in England.

== Division One ==
Sussex County Football League Division One
- Season: 2003–04
- Champions: Chichester City United
- Relegated: Selsey; Shoreham
- Matches: 342
- Goals: 1,099 (3.21 per match)

Division One featured 16 clubs which competed in the division last season, along with four new clubs.

- Clubs promoted from Division Two:
  - East Grinstead Town
  - Eastbourne Town
  - Rye & Iden United
- Plus:
  - St Leonards, relegated from the Southern League

St Leonards resigned from the league January 2004 and their playing record of P21 W7 D4 L10 GF32 GA35 P25 was expunged.

=== League table ===
Pos	Team	Pld	W	D	L	GF	GA	GD	Pts	Qualification or relegation
1	Chichester City United	36	23	8	5	87	40	+47	77	
2	Rye & Iden United	36	20	11	5	75	37	+38	71	
3	East Preston	36	22	5	9	72	36	+36	71	
4	Three Bridges	36	20	10	6	63	34	+29	70	
5	Eastbourne Town	36	21	3	12	85	53	+32	66	
6	Arundel	36	18	7	11	77	61	+16	61	
7	Hassocks	36	16	11	9	74	54	+20	59	
8	Whitehawk	36	17	8	11	59	48	+11	59	
9	East Grinstead Town	36	17	4	15	64	60	+4	55	
10	Ringmer	36	14	11	11	54	54	0	53	
11	Redhill	36	13	7	16	53	50	+3	46	
12	Hailsham Town	36	13	7	16	55	58	−3	46	
13	Horsham YMCA	36	11	9	16	55	62	−7	42	
14	Southwick	36	10	11	15	39	51	−12	41	
15	Sidlesham	36	10	8	18	50	71	−21	38	
16	Sidley United	36	10	8	18	42	63	−21	38	
17	Pagham	36	6	10	20	30	55	−25	28	
18	Selsey	36	5	5	26	35	94	−59	20	Relegated to Division Two
19	Shoreham	36	2	5	29	30	118	−88	11	Relegated to Division Two
20	St Leonards	0	0	0	0	0	0	0	0	Resigned from the league, record expunged

Source: nonleaguematters
Rules for classification: 1) points; 2) goal difference; 3) number of goals scored.

== Division Two ==
Sussex County Football League Division Two
- Season: 2003–04
- Champions: Littlehampton Town
- Promoted: Littlehampton Town; Worthing United; Eastbourne United Association
- Relegated: Haywards Heath Town
- Matches: 306
- Goals: 1,013 (3.31 per match)

Division Two featured 12 clubs which competed in the division last season, along with six new clubs.

- Clubs relegated from Division One:
  - Littlehampton Town
  - Peacehaven & Telscombe
  - Wick
- Clubs promoted from Division Three:
  - Haywards Heath Town
  - Midhurst & Easebourne
- Plus:
  - Eastbourne United Association, formed as merger of Eastbourne United and Shinewater Association

=== League table ===
Pos	Team	Pld	W	D	L	GF	GA	GD	Pts	Qualification or relegation
1	Littlehampton Town	34	23	7	4	89	29	+60	76	Promoted to Division One
2	Worthing United	34	21	6	7	74	32	+42	69	Promoted to Division One
3	Eastbourne United Association	34	18	12	4	78	39	+39	66	Promoted to Division One
4	Wick	34	17	8	9	57	38	+19	59	
5	Oakwood	34	18	4	12	77	50	+27	58	
6	Midhurst & Easebourne	34	18	4	12	75	50	+25	58	
7	Mile Oak	34	17	6	11	56	49	+7	57	
8	Steyning Town	34	16	9	9	39	35	+4	57	
9	Westfield	34	16	5	13	70	63	+7	53	
10	Broadbridge Heath	34	15	5	14	51	54	−3	50	
11	Crawley Down	34	14	5	15	51	48	+3	47	
12	Peacehaven & Telscombe	34	14	4	16	54	52	+2	46	
13	Saltdean United	34	11	7	16	52	56	−4	40	
14	Wealden	34	12	4	18	43	64	−21	40	
15	Seaford	34	10	8	16	55	51	+4	38	
16	Pease Pottage Village	34	5	5	24	43	121	−78	20	
17	Lancing	34	4	4	26	26	89	−63	16	
18	Haywards Heath Town	34	3	5	26	23	93	−70	14	Relegated to Division Three

Source: nonleaguematters
Rules for classification: 1) points; 2) goal difference; 3) number of goals scored.

== Division Three ==
Sussex County Football League Division Three
- Season: 2003–04
- Champions: Crowborough Athletic
- Promoted: Crowborough Athletic; St Francis Rangers
- Matches: 182
- Goals: 702 (3.86 per match)

Division Three featured 13 clubs which competed in the division last season, along with one new club:

- Wadhurst United, joined from the East Sussex League

Also, Ifield merged with Edwards Sports to form Ifield Edwards.

=== League table ===
Pos	Team	Pld	W	D	L	GF	GA	GD	Pts	Qualification or relegation
1	Crowborough Athletic	26	21	1	4	91	27	+64	64	Promoted to Division Two
2	St Francis Rangers	26	17	2	7	69	41	+28	53	Promoted to Division Two
3	Ifield Edwards	26	16	4	6	71	39	+32	52	
4	Wadhurst United	26	15	5	6	58	35	+23	50	
5	Storrington	26	14	5	7	55	37	+18	47	
6	Franklands Village	26	12	5	9	50	30	+20	41	Resigned to the Mid-Sussex League
7	Uckfield Town	26	12	2	12	47	53	−6	38	
8	Lingfield	26	10	5	11	46	43	+3	35	
9	Hurstpierpoint	26	9	5	12	42	52	−10	32	
10	Bosham	26	10	2	14	43	55	−12	32	
11	Forest	26	9	2	15	41	56	−15	29	
12	Bexhill United	26	8	4	14	38	54	−16	28	
13	Newhaven	26	6	2	18	40	60	−20	20	
14	Upper Beeding	26	0	2	24	11	120	−109	2	

Source: nonleaguematters
Rules for classification: 1) points; 2) goal difference; 3) number of goals scored.
