= 1901–02 FA Cup qualifying rounds =

The qualifying campaign for the 1901–02 FA Cup, the thirty-first staging of the world's oldest association football competition, consisted of six rounds of matches, which began on 21 September 1901 with the preliminary round. The Cup was eventually won by Sheffield United, who beat Southampton in the final.

Matches were scheduled to be played at the stadium of the team named first on the date specified for each round, which was always a Saturday. If scores were level after 90 minutes had been played, a replay would take place at the stadium of the second-named team later the same week. If the replayed match was drawn further replays would be held at neutral venues until a winner was determined.

== Tournament calendar ==
Round	Date	Matches	Number of clubs
Preliminary round	22 September 1900	27	222→195
First qualifying round	6 October 1900	48	195→147
Second qualifying round	20 October 1900	37	147→110
Third qualifying round	3 November 1900	38	110→72
Fourth qualifying round	17 November 1900	20	72→52
Fifth qualifying round	8 December 1900	10	52→42
Intermediate round	5 January 1901	10	42→32
First round proper	9 February 1901	16	32→16
Second round proper	23 February 1901	8	16→8
Third round proper	23 March 1901	4	8→4
Semi-final	6 April 1901	2	4→2
Final	20 April 1901	1	2→1

== Preliminary round ==
	Home team	Score	Away team	Date
1	Eastbourne	5–2	St Leonards	21 September 1901
2	Worthing	0–4	Hastings & St Leonards	21 September 1901
3	Sheffield	5–2	Attercliffe	21 September 1901
4	Chatham	0–2	Grays United	21 September 1901
5	Rotherham Town	2–2	Roundel	21 September 1901
5r	Roundel	3–1	Rotherham Town	26 September 1901
6	Oswaldtwistle Rovers	7–0	Trawden Forest	21 September 1901
7	Scarborough	1–2	Thornaby	21 September 1901
8	Stockton	4–1	Whitby	21 September 1901
9	Norwich CEYMS	18–0	Bury St Edmunds	21 September 1901
10	Leadgate Park	3–0	Darlington	21 September 1901
11	Wellingborough Town	4–0	Rushden	21 September 1901
12	Moss Bay Exchange	2–0	Frizington United	21 September 1901
13	Leytonstone	2–0	West Ham Garfield	21 September 1901
14	Hampstead	1–3	Willesden Town	21 September 1901
15	West Croydon	2–6	Redhill	21 September 1901
16	Bromley	0–3	West Norwood	21 September 1901
17	London Welsh	0–1	Crouch End Vampires	21 September 1901
18	Denaby United	2–2	Thornhill United	21 September 1901
18r	Thornhill United	2–3	Denaby United	26 September 1901
19	Kirkley	1–1	Harwich & Parkeston	21 September 1901
19r	Harwich & Parkeston	1–0	Kirkley	26 September 1901
20	Grangetown Athletic	0–1	South Bank	21 September 1901
21	King's Lynn	0–3	Lowestoft Town	21 September 1901
22	West Hartlepool	4–2	Stockton St John's	21 September 1901
23	Lynn Swifts	3–4	Great Yarmouth Town	21 September 1901
24	Eastbourne Old Town	0–3	Eastbourne Swifts	21 September 1901
25	Brighton & Hove Albion	6–2	Brighton Athletic	21 September 1901
26	Mexborough St Johns	2–1	Wycliffe	21 September 1901
27	Chiswick	2–3	Fulham	21 September 1901

== First qualifying round ==
	Home team	Score	Away team	Date
1	Barrow	3–2	Black Diamonds	5 October 1901
2	South Bank	2–2	Stockton	5 October 1901
2r	Stockton	W–W	South Bank	—
3	Olympic	0–7	Leyton	5 October 1901
4	Newark	5–1	Boston Town	5 October 1901
5	Oswaldtwistle Rovers	5–1	Blackburn Park Road	5 October 1901
6	Luton Town	13–1	Apsley	5 October 1901
7	Morpeth Harriers	5–1	Shankhouse	5 October 1901
8	Shrewsbury Town	1–1	Oswestry United	5 October 1901
9	Oswestry United	2–0	Shrewsbury Town	10 October 1901
10	Belper Town	6–1	Derby Hills Ivanhoe	5 October 1901
11	Norwich CEYMS	1–1	Lowestoft Town	5 October 1901
11r	Lowestoft Town	5–0	Norwich CEYMS	10 October 1901
12	Darlington St Augustine's	1–0	Tow Law	5 October 1901
13	Ashford United	0–0	Sittingbourne	5 October 1901
13r	Sittingbourne	1–0	Ashford United	9 October 1901
14	Mickley	0–0	Gateshead NER	5 October 1901
14r	Gateshead NER	3–0	Mickley	10 October 1901
15	Chesham Generals	3–1	Chesham Town	5 October 1901
16	Ironbridge	2–2	Stafford Rangers	5 October 1901
16r	Stafford Rangers	W–W	Ironbridge	—
17	Hebburn Argyle	1–2	Sunderland Royal Rovers	5 October 1901
18	Worksop Town	5–1	Grantham Avenue	5 October 1901
19	Slough	3–0	Windsor & Eton	5 October 1901
20	Newstead Byron	W–W	Bulwell United	—
21	Swanscombe	0–0	Sheppey United	5 October 1901
21r	Sheppey United	1–0	Swanscombe	9 October 1901
22	Stapleford Town	0–4	Ilkeston Town	5 October 1901
23	West Norwood	7–1	Redhill	5 October 1901
24	Leytonstone	1–2	Upton Park	5 October 1901
25	Hunslet	1–1	Royston United	5 October 1901
25r	Royston United	W–W	Hunslet	—
26	Accrington Stanley	2–1	Nelson	5 October 1901
27	Crouch End Vampires	4–2	Fulham	5 October 1901
28	Eastbourne Swifts	0–1	Hastings & St Leonards	5 October 1901
29	Rothwell Town Swifts	2–1	Finedon Revellers	5 October 1901
30	Halesowen	2–3	Brierley Hill Alliance	5 October 1901
31	Shepherd's Bush	5–4	Southall	5 October 1901
32	Eastleigh Athletic	0–3	Freemantle	5 October 1901
33	Maidstone United	3–1	Folkestone	5 October 1901
34	Wandsworth	0–1	Godalming	5 October 1901
35	Harwich & Parkeston	0–1	Great Yarmouth Town	5 October 1901
36	Frizington White Star	1–2	Moss Bay Exchange	5 October 1901
37	White Star Wanderers	1–3	Hudsons	5 October 1901
38	Birkenhead	1–1	Chester	5 October 1901
38r	Chester (disqualified)	5–4	Birkenhead	9 October 1901
39	Haydock	0–5	Wigan United	5 October 1901
40	Denaby United	3–0	Sheffield	5 October 1901
41	Desborough Town	1–5	Wellingborough Town	5 October 1901
42	Wath Athletic	3–2	Altofts	5 October 1901
43	Winsford United	1–1	Middlewich Rangers	5 October 1901
43r	Middlewich Rangers	1–4	Winsford United	9 October 1901
44	Stanley United	0–2	Leadgate Park	5 October 1901
45	Willesden Town	5–1	Vulcans	5 October 1901
46	Bridgwater	3–2	Avalon Rovers	5 October 1901
47	West Hartlepool	1–3	Thornaby	5 October 1901
48	St Helens	2–1	Earlestown	5 October 1901
49	Roundel	4–0	Mexborough St Johns	5 October 1901
50	Brighton & Hove Albion	3–1	Eastbourne	5 October 1901
51	Bedford Queens Works	3–1	Leighton Cee Springs	5 October 1901
52	Chatham Amateurs	1–2	Grays United	5 October 1901

== Second qualifying round ==
	Home team	Score	Away team	Date
1	Barrow	1–1	Moss Bay Exchange	19 October 1901
1r	Moss Bay Exchange	1–3	Barrow	26 October 1901
2	Leyton	4–4	Upton Park	19 October 1901
2r	Upton Park	0–6	Leyton	24 October 1901
3	Thornaby	1–0	Stockton	19 October 1901
4	Chirk	0–2	Wrexham	19 October 1901
5	Luton Town	4–2	Bedford Queens Works	19 October 1901
6	Morpeth Harriers	2–3	Gateshead NER	19 October 1901
7	Belper Town	2–4	Ilkeston Town	19 October 1901
8	Nantwich	3–0	Winsford United	19 October 1901
9	Darlington St Augustine's	4–0	Leadgate Park	19 October 1901
10	Brierley Hill Alliance	4–1	Stourbridge	19 October 1901
11	Buxton	–	Bye	—
12	Wellingborough Town	4–0	Rothwell Town Swifts	19 October 1901
13	Worksop Town	5–1	Newark	19 October 1901
14	Sittingbourne	2–4	Maidstone United	19 October 1901
15	Coalville Town	3–4	Gresley Rovers	19 October 1901
16	Newstead Byron	2–0	Hucknall Town	19 October 1901
17	Trowbridge Town	0–5	Yeovil Casuals	19 October 1901
18	Staple Hill	1–1	Bristol East	19 October 1901
18r	Bristol East	1–0	Staple Hill	23 October 1901
19	Berwick Rangers	3–2	Kidderminster Harriers	19 October 1901
20	Accrington Stanley	1–1	Oswaldtwistle Rovers	19 October 1901
20r	Oswaldtwistle Rovers	0–2	Accrington Stanley	23 October 1901
21	Aylesbury United	2–1	Chesham Generals	19 October 1901
22	Crouch End Vampires	3–1	Willesden Town	19 October 1901
23	Grays United	0–0	Sheppey United	19 October 1901
23r	Sheppey United	0–0	Grays United	23 October 1901
23r2	Grays United	3–0	Sheppey United	28 October 1901
24	Oswestry United	1–1	Stafford Rangers	19 October 1901
24r	Stafford Rangers	0–2	Oswestry United	23 October 1901
25	Rochdale Town	7–2	Black Lane Temperance	19 October 1901
26	Richmond Association	1–1	Shepherd's Bush	19 October 1901
26r	Shepherd's Bush	1–0	Richmond Association	24 October 1901
27	Maidenhead Norfolkians	2–0	Slough	19 October 1901
28	Denaby United	3–0	Roundel	19 October 1901
29	Great Yarmouth Town	0–2	Lowestoft Town	19 October 1901
30	Royston United	6–2	Wath Athletic	19 October 1901
31	Hudsons	2–2	Birkenhead	19 October 1901
31r	Birkenhead	2–1	Hudsons	24 October 1901
32	Godalming	0–2	West Norwood	19 October 1901
33	Bridgwater	1–4	Street	19 October 1901
34	Whiteheads	1–0	Freemantle	19 October 1901
35	Wigan United	0–1	St Helens Town A.F.C. (1901)	19 October 1901
36	Brighton & Hove Albion	5–0	Hastings & St Leonards	19 October 1901
37	South Shields Athletic	0–0	Sunderland Royal Rovers	19 October 1901
37r	Sunderland Royal Rovers	3–1	South Shields Athletic	23 October 1901
38	Shaddongate United	5–1	Keswick	19 October 1901

== Third qualifying round ==
	Home team	Score	Away team	Date
1	Darwen	2–1	Accrington Stanley	2 November 1901
2	Barrow	4–0	Rochdale Town	2 November 1901
3	Bristol City	5–1	Bristol East	2 November 1901
4	Kettering	1–0	Wellingborough Town	2 November 1901
5	Weymouth	W–W	Street	—
6	Leyton	0–1	West Ham United	2 November 1901
7	Thornaby	1–2	Sunderland Royal Rovers	2 November 1901
8	Marlow	0–3	Brentford	2 November 1901
9	Civil Service	1–3	West Norwood	2 November 1901
10	Southport Central	0–0	Blackpool	2 November 1901
10r	Blackpool	0–0	Southport Central	6 November 1901
10r2	Southport Central	2–1	Blackpool	11 November 1901
11	Burslem Port Vale	6–0	Wellington Town	2 November 1901
12	Swindon Town	4–0	Yeovil Casuals	2 November 1901
13	Nantwich	2–1	Birkenhead	2 November 1901
14	Gateshead NER	0–2	Wallsend Park Villa	2 November 1901
15	Bishop Auckland	2–0	Jarrow	2 November 1901
16	Darlington St Augustine's	1–1	Willington Athletic	2 November 1901
16r	Willington Athletic	1–1	Darlington St Augustine's	6 November 1901
16r2	Darlington St Augustine's	2–0	Willington Athletic	11 November 1901
17	Brierley Hill Alliance	1–1	Walsall	2 November 1901
17r	Walsall	2–1	Brierley Hill Alliance	7 November 1901
18	Buxton	0–2	Stockport County	2 November 1901
19	Worksop Town	0–4	Lincoln City	2 November 1901
20	New Brompton	6–1	Ilford	2 November 1901
21	Ilkeston Town	2–1	Denaby United	2 November 1901
22	Stalybridge Rovers	0–2	Crewe Alexandra	2 November 1901
23	Newstead Byron	0–2	Hinckley Town	2 November 1901
24	Gresley Rovers	0–2	Northampton Town	2 November 1901
25	Wycombe Wanderers	1–1	Maidenhead	2 November 1901
25r	Maidenhead	0–2	Wycombe Wanderers	7 November 1901
26	Oxford City	W–W	Aylesbury United	—
27	Queens Park Rangers	2–0	Crouch End Vampires	2 November 1901
28	Berwick Rangers	11–2	Coventry City	2 November 1901
29	Grays United	2–0	Maidstone United	2 November 1901
30	Barnsley	1–0	Gainsborough Trinity	2 November 1901
31	Oswestry United	1–2	Wrexham	2 November 1901
32	Bristol Rovers	5–0	Whiteheads	2 November 1901
33	Lowestoft Town	1–2	Luton Town	2 November 1901
34	Glossop	5–2	St Helens	2 November 1901
35	Maidenhead Norfolkians	0–4	Shepherd's Bush	2 November 1901
36	West Hampstead	1–2	Watford	2 November 1901
37	Royston United	1–3	Doncaster Rovers	2 November 1901
38	Brighton & Hove Albion	2–3	Clapton	2 November 1901
39	Whitwick White Cross	0–3	Burton United	2 November 1901
40	Shaddongate United	0–2	Workington	2 November 1901

== Fourth qualifying round ==
	Home team	Score	Away team	Date
1	Clapton	2–2	New Brompton	16 November 1901
1r	New Brompton	2–0	Clapton	20 November 1901
2	Barrow	2–3	Darwen	16 November 1901
3	Kettering	1–1	Hinckley Town	16 November 1901
3r	Hinckley Town	2–2	Kettering	21 November 1901
3r2	Kettering	6–0	Hinckley Town	25 November 1901
4	Watford	1–2	Luton Town	16 November 1901
5	Walsall	2–1	Berwick Rangers	16 November 1901
6	Southport Central	4–0	Workington	16 November 1901
7	Lincoln City	1–0	Doncaster Rovers	16 November 1901
8	Swindon Town	2–1	Weymouth	16 November 1901
9	Nantwich	1–3	Glossop	16 November 1901
10	Wrexham	0–0	Burslem Port Vale	28 November 1901
10r	Burslem Port Vale	3–1	Wrexham	30 November 1901
11	Stockport County	3–2	Crewe Alexandra	16 November 1901
12	Ilkeston Town	2–4	Barnsley	16 November 1901
13	Wycombe Wanderers	2–5	Oxford City	16 November 1901
14	Queens Park Rangers	4–0	West Norwood	20 November 1901
15	Wallsend Park Villa	2–2	Bishop Auckland	16 November 1901
15r	Bishop Auckland	3–2	Wallsend Park Villa	20 November 1901
16	Brentford	2–3	Shepherd's Bush	23 November 1901
17	Bristol Rovers	1–1	Bristol City	23 November 1901
17r	Bristol City	2–3	Bristol Rovers	27 November 1901
18	West Ham United	1–2	Grays United	16 November 1901
19	Burton United	0–0	Northampton Town	20 November 1901
19r	Northampton Town	2–0	Burton United	25 November 1901
20	Sunderland Royal Rovers	0–1	Darlington St Augustine's	16 November 1901

== Fifth qualifying round ==
	Home team	Score	Away team	Date
1	Kettering	2–2	Northampton Town	30 November 1901
1r	Northampton Town	2–0	Kettering	2 December 1901
2	Southport Central	2–2	Darwen	30 November 1901
2r	Darwen	2–2	Southport Central	3 December 1901
2r2	Darwen	1–0	Southport Central	9 December 1901
3	Burslem Port Vale	1–2	Walsall	7 December 1901
4	Luton Town	2–0	Queens Park Rangers	30 November 1901
5	Swindon Town	0–1	Bristol Rovers	30 November 1901
6	Bishop Auckland	4–2	Darlington St Augustine's	30 November 1901
7	New Brompton	1–0	Grays United	30 November 1901
8	Barnsley	0–0	Lincoln City	30 November 1901
8r	Lincoln City	3–1	Barnsley	4 December 1901
9	Shepherd's Bush	1–3	Oxford City	30 November 1901
10	Glossop	2–0	Stockport County	30 November 1901
