= 1963–64 Sussex County Football League =

The 1963–64 Sussex County Football League season was the 39th in the history of Sussex County Football League a football competition in England.

== Division One ==
Sussex County Football League Division One
- Season: 1963–64
- Champions: Whitehawk
- Relegated: APV Athletic; Sidley United
- Matches played: 272
- Goals scored: 1,158 (4.26 per match)

Division One featured 17 clubs which competed in the division last season, no new clubs joined the division.

=== League table ===
Pos	Team	Pld	W	D	L	GF	GA	GR	Pts	Qualification or relegation
1	Whitehawk	32	26	2	4	101	31	3.258	54	
2	Lewes	32	25	1	6	109	42	2.595	51	
3	Haywards Heath	32	19	7	6	70	38	1.842	45	
4	Littlehampton Town	32	19	2	11	79	54	1.463	40	
5	Chichester City	32	17	5	10	78	65	1.200	39	
6	Shoreham	32	17	3	12	76	76	1.000	37	
7	Hastings Rangers	32	15	6	11	63	64	0.984	36	
8	Bexhill Town Athletic	32	13	7	12	75	59	1.271	33	
9	Rye United	32	11	7	14	76	72	1.056	29	
10	Newhaven	32	12	4	16	58	88	0.659	28	
11	Bognor Regis Town	32	12	3	17	61	70	0.871	27	
12	Wigmore Athletic	32	10	6	16	61	68	0.897	26	
13	Lancing	32	9	7	16	51	70	0.729	25	
14	East Grinstead	32	9	6	17	44	67	0.657	24	
15	Arundel	32	6	8	18	46	70	0.657	20	
16	APV Athletic	32	9	1	22	63	104	0.606	19	Relegated to Division Two
17	Sidley United	32	5	1	26	47	120	0.392	11	Relegated to Division Two

Source: nonleaguematters
Rules for classification: 1) points; 2) goal ratio.

== Division Two ==
Sussex County Football League Division Two
- Season: 1963–64
- Champions: Selsey
- Promoted: Selsey; Seaford Town
- Matches played: 210
- Goals scored: 1,105 (5.26 per match)

Division Two featured 13 clubs which competed in the division last season, along with two new clubs:

- Portfield, joined from the West Sussex League
- Ringmer, joined from the Brighton, Hove & District League

=== League table ===
Pos	Team	Pld	W	D	L	GF	GA	GR	Pts	Qualification or relegation
1	Selsey	28	26	0	2	145	33	4.394	52	Promoted to Division One
2	Seaford Town	28	24	3	1	140	38	3.684	51	Promoted to Division One
3	Ringmer	28	21	3	4	106	36	2.944	45	
4	Southwick	28	17	5	6	91	41	2.220	39	
5	Horsham YMCA	28	16	5	7	84	63	1.333	37	
6	Brighton North End	28	13	2	13	74	69	1.072	28	
7	Hastings & St Leonards	28	12	3	13	51	76	0.671	27	
8	Old Varndeanians	28	9	5	14	45	55	0.818	23	
9	Uckfield Town	28	11	0	17	49	101	0.485	22	
10	Battle Rangers	28	9	3	16	65	92	0.707	21	
11	Three Bridges United	28	8	3	17	58	86	0.674	19	
12	Burgess Hill	28	5	7	16	52	82	0.634	17	
13	Portfield	28	6	3	19	47	96	0.490	15	
14	Moulsecombe Rovers	28	6	1	21	60	118	0.508	13	Resigned from the league
15	Brighton Old Grammarians	28	4	3	21	38	119	0.319	11	

Source: nonleaguematters
Rules for classification: 1) points; 2) goal ratio.
