= 1900–01 FA Cup qualifying rounds =

Association football competition

The qualifying rounds for the 1900–01 Football Association Challenge Cup (FA Cup for short), the 30th edition of the world's oldest association football competition, consisting of six rounds of matches played between September and December 1900. A total of 220 teams entered the tournament, 178 of which played in at least one qualifying stage. The 1900–01 FA Cup began on 22 September 1900 when 40 teams competed in the preliminary round and ended on 20 April 1901, when Southern League side Tottenham Hotspur became the only ever non-League club to win the competition.

== Tournament calendar ==
Round	Date	Ties	Byes	Number of clubs
Preliminary round	Saturday 22 September 1900	20	0	220→200
First qualifying round	Saturday 6 October 1900	55	0	200→145
Second qualifying round	Saturday 20 October 1900	35	3	145→110
Third qualifying round	Saturday 3 November 1900	38	2	110→72
Fourth qualifying round	Saturday 17 November 1900	20	0	72→52
Fifth qualifying round	Saturday 8 December 1900	10	0	52→42
Intermediate round	Saturday 5 January 1901	10	0	42→32
First round proper	Saturday 9 February 1901	16	0	32→16
Second round proper	Saturday 23 February 1901	8	0	16→8
Third round proper	Saturday 23 March 1901	4	0	8→4
Semi-final	Saturday 6 April 1901	2	0	4→2
Final	Saturday 20 April 1901	1	0	2→1

== Preliminary round ==
	Home team	Score	Away team	Date
1	Eastbourne	6–0	Worthing	22 September 1900
2	Darlington	3–0	Tow Law	22 September 1900
3	Sheffield	1–3	Attercliffe	22 September 1900
4	Leyton	1–1	West Ham Garfield	22 September 1900
4r	West Ham Garfield	4–1	Leyton	27 September 1900
5	Turton	0–2	Heywood	22 September 1900
6	Olympic	5–0	Upton Park	22 September 1900
7	Stockton	0–2	South Bank	22 September 1900
8	Doncaster Rovers	6–1	Rotherham Town	22 September 1900
9	Norwich CEYMS	1–2	Lowestoft Town	22 September 1900
10	Bishop Auckland	5–2	Stanley United	22 September 1900
11	Leadgate Park	3–0	Crook Town	22 September 1900
12	Worksop Town	3–2	Denaby United	22 September 1900
13	Howden-le-Wear	0–2	Darlington St Augustine's	22 September 1900
14	Hampstead	0–4	West Hampstead	22 September 1900
15	Altofts	2–3	Wath Athletic	22 September 1900
16	Colchester Town	7–0	Bury St Edmunds	22 September 1900
17	Woodford	1–1	Leytonstone	22 September 1900
17r	Leytonstone	1–10	Woodford	27 September 1900
18	Great Yarmouth Town	1–1	Harwich & Parkeston	22 September 1900
18r	Harwich & Parkeston	W–W	Great Yarmouth Town	—
19	King's Lynn	2–0	Kirkley	22 September 1900
20	Willesden Town	1–3	Civil Service	22 September 1900

== First qualifying round ==
	Home team	Score	Away team	Date
1	South Bank	0–3	Thornaby Utopians	6 October 1900
2	Shankhouse	0–1	Gateshead NER	6 October 1900
3	Sheppey United	1–0	Gravesend United	6 October 1900
4	Folkestone	3–3	Sittingbourne	6 October 1900
4r	Sittingbourne	W–W	Folkestone	—
5	Maidenhead	W–W	Maidenhead Norfolkians	—
6	Civil Service	4–1	West Hampstead	6 October 1900
7	Druids	1–2	Chirk	6 October 1900
8	Blackburn Park Road	5–1	Trawden Forest	6 October 1900
9	Newark	6–1	Boston Town	6 October 1900
10	Oswaldtwistle Rovers	4–0	Great Harwood	6 October 1900
11	Burton Wanderers	2–2	Gresley Rovers	6 October 1900
11r	Gresley Rovers	1–1	Burton Wanderers	11 October 1900
11r2	Burton Wanderers	2–4	Gresley Rovers	15 October 1900
12	Attercliffe	0–2	Doncaster Rovers	6 October 1900
13	Belper Town	2–0	Heanor Town	6 October 1900
14	Workington	4–3	Moss Bay Exchange	6 October 1900
15	Darlington St Augustine's	1–1	Darlington	6 October 1900
16	Darlington	4–1	Darlington St Augustine's	6 October 1900
17	Stourbridge	5–2	Kidderminster Harriers	6 October 1900
18	Tranmere Rovers	0–1	White Star Wanderers	6 October 1900
19	Leadgate Park	2–2	Bishop Auckland	6 October 1900
19r	Bishop Auckland	3–1	Leadgate Park	10 October 1900
20	Mickley	1–2	St Peter's Albion	6 October 1900
21	Chesham Generals	0–0	Chesham Town	6 October 1900
21r	Chesham Town	0–3	Chesham Generals	11 October 1900
22	Rushden	4–1	Desborough Town	6 October 1900
23	Worksop Town	7–2	Montrose Works	6 October 1900
24	Ilkeston Town	2–0	Stapleford Town	6 October 1900
25	Coalville Town	3–1	Swadlincote	6 October 1900
26	Newstead Byron	W–W	Hucknall Portland	—
27	Swanscombe	0–3	Grays United	6 October 1900
28	Hinckley Town	W–W	Nuneaton Town	—
29	Middlewich Rangers	0–3	Nantwich	6 October 1900
30	Wallsend Park Villa	1–1	Prudhoe	6 October 1900
30r	Prudhoe	2–3	Wallsend Park Villa	10 October 1900
31	Crouch End Vampires	3–0	London Welsh	6 October 1900
32	Eastbourne Swifts	1–2	Brighton Athletic	6 October 1900
33	Rothwell Town Swifts	1–3	Finedon Revellers	6 October 1900
34	Rochdale	1–0	Rossendale United	6 October 1900
35	Halesowen	1–2	Brierley Hill Alliance	6 October 1900
36	West Croydon	5–0	West Norwood	6 October 1900
37	Rhyl United	3–0	Llandudno Swifts	6 October 1900
38	Maidstone United	4–0	Ashford United	6 October 1900
39	Richmond Association	3–2	Shepherd's Bush	6 October 1900
40	Freetown	3–1	Heywood	6 October 1900
41	South Shields	1–2	Morpeth Harriers	6 October 1900
42	Birkenhead	3–0	Buckley Victoria	6 October 1900
43	West Ham Garfield	0–3	Olympic	6 October 1900
44	Colchester Town	2–5	Lowestoft Town	6 October 1900
45	Stockton St John's	0–2	Thornaby	10 October 1900
46	Wath Athletic	3–0	Wombwell Town	6 October 1900
47	Woodford	2–3	Ilford	6 October 1900
48	Grantham Avenue	3–1	Grimsby All Saints	6 October 1900
49	Royston United	1–2	Hunslet	6 October 1900
50	Brighton & Hove Rangers	3–0	Eastbourne	6 October 1900
51	Godalming	4–3	Redhill	6 October 1900
52	Mansfield Foresters	2–1	Bulwell United	6 October 1900
53	King's Lynn	2–1	Harwich & Parkeston	6 October 1900
54	Keswick	3–2	Frizington White Star	6 October 1900
55	Earlestown	3–0	Haydock	6 October 1900

== Second qualifying round ==
	Home team	Score	Away team	Date
1	Olympic	1–1	Ilford	20 October 1900
1r	Ilford	0–2	Olympic	25 October 1900
2	Blackburn Park Road	3–0	Oswaldtwistle Rovers	20 October 1900
3	Morpeth Harriers	0–1	Gateshead NER	20 October 1900
4	Nantwich	5–2	Winsford United	20 October 1900
5	Bishop Auckland	3–0	Darlington	20 October 1900
6	Buxton	–	Bye	—
7	Stourbridge	2–2	Brierley Hill Alliance	20 October 1900
7r	Brierley Hill Alliance	1–3	Stourbridge	22 October 1900
8	Finedon Revellers	2–2	Rushden	20 October 1900
8r	Rushden	0–1	Finedon Revellers	25 October 1900
9	Chesham Generals	1–0	Aylesbury United	20 October 1900
10	Worksop Town	0–0	Doncaster Rovers	20 October 1900
10r	Doncaster Rovers	2–1	Worksop Town	25 October 1900
11	Ilkeston Town	6–1	Belper Town	20 October 1900
12	Slough	2–2	Maidenhead	20 October 1900
12r	Maidenhead	3–0	Slough	25 October 1900
13	Gresley Rovers	2–0	Coalville Town	20 October 1900
14	Oxford City	–	Bye	—
15	Hinckley Town	W–W	Loughborough	—
16	Hunslet	4–1	Wath Athletic	20 October 1900
17	St Peter's Albion	1–5	Wallsend Park Villa	20 October 1900
18	Crouch End Vampires	0–1	Civil Service	20 October 1900
19	Grays United	1–0	Sheppey United	20 October 1900
20	Oswestry United	W–W	Ironbridge	—
21	Rhyl United	0–0	Chirk	20 October 1900
21r	Chirk	W–W	Rhyl United	—
22	Maidstone United	2–2	Sittingbourne	20 October 1900
22r	Sittingbourne	0–0	Maidstone United	24 October 1900
22r2	Maidstone United	2–0	Sittingbourne	29 October 1900
23	Richmond Association	W–W	1st Coldstream Guards	—
24	Freetown	0–3	Rochdale	20 October 1900
25	Welshpool	W–W	Aberystwyth	—
26	Thornaby Utopians	2–1	Thornaby	20 October 1900
27	Birkenhead	0–1	White Star Wanderers	20 October 1900
28	Brighton Athletic	0–4	Brighton & Hove Rangers	20 October 1900
29	Yeovil Casuals	6–1	Street	20 October 1900
30	Bristol East	–	Bye	—
31	Grantham Avenue	0–0	Newark	20 October 1900
31r	Newark	4–2	Grantham Avenue	25 October 1900
32	Hudsons	1–2	Southport Central	20 October 1900
33	Godalming	4–0	West Croydon	20 October 1900
34	Mansfield Foresters	1–2	Newstead Byron	20 October 1900
35	King's Lynn	3–0	Lowestoft Town	20 October 1900
36	Keswick	1–2	Workington	20 October 1900
37	Leighton Cee Springs	W–W	Hitchin	—
38	Earlestown	5–0	Swinton Town	20 October 1900

== Third qualifying round ==
	Home team	Score	Away team	Date
1	Chesterfield	8–3	Hunslet	3 November 1900
2	Clapton	8–1	Maidstone United	3 November 1900
3	Darwen	3–1	Nelson	3 November 1900
4	Kettering	7–0	Finedon Revellers	3 November 1900
5	Watford	10–0	Leighton Cee Springs	3 November 1900
6	Weymouth	4–3	Yeovil Casuals	3 November 1900
7	Marlow	3–5	Chesham Generals	3 November 1900
8	Blackburn Park Road	0–1	Blackpool	3 November 1900
9	Southport Central	3–1	Chorley	3 November 1900
10	Crewe Alexandra	3–0	Stalybridge Rovers	3 November 1900
11	Middlesbrough	3–3	Willington Athletic	3 November 1900
11r	Willington Athletic	0–0	Middlesbrough	7 November 1900
11r2	Middlesbrough	8–0	Willington Athletic	12 November 1900
12	Lincoln City	0–0	Gainsborough Trinity	3 November 1900
12r	Gainsborough Trinity	1–1	Lincoln City	7 November 1900
12r2	Lincoln City	3–1	Gainsborough Trinity	12 November 1900
13	Chirk	8–1	Welshpool	3 November 1900
14	Burton Swifts	2–2	Newstead Byron	3 November 1900
14r	Newstead Byron	0–4	Burton Swifts	7 November 1900
15	Swindon Town	1–1	Bristol East	3 November 1900
15r	Swindon Town	5–0	Bristol East	12 November 1900
16	Shrewsbury Town	1–1	Walsall	3 November 1900
16r	Walsall	1–0	Shrewsbury Town	8 November 1900
17	Workington	W–W	Rochdale	—
18	Nantwich	2–1	Buxton	3 November 1900
19	Gateshead NER	0–1	Jarrow	3 November 1900
20	Stockport County	6–2	Wrexham	3 November 1900
21	Newark	2–1	Ilkeston Town	7 November 1900
22	Wellington Town	W–W	Stourbridge	—
23	Gresley Rovers	2–0	Wellingborough Town	3 November 1900
24	Oxford City	0–4	Reading	3 November 1900
25	Hinckley Town	2–0	Northampton Town	3 November 1900
26	Queens Park Rangers	7–0	Fulham	3 November 1900
27	Staple Hill	–	Bye	—
28	Wallsend Park Villa	3–0	Hebburn Argyle	3 November 1900
29	Grays United	0–2	New Brompton	3 November 1900
30	Barnsley	2–1	Doncaster Rovers	3 November 1900
31	Brentford	3–1	Maidenhead	3 November 1900
32	Oswestry United	W–W	Coventry City	—
33	Bristol Rovers	–	Bye	—
34	Richmond Association	W–W	Wycombe Wanderers	—
35	Thornaby Utopians	1–5	Bishop Auckland	3 November 1900
36	Brighton & Hove Rangers	1–5	Chatham	3 November 1900
37	Godalming	1–2	Civil Service	3 November 1900
38	King's Lynn	1–4	Luton Town	3 November 1900
39	West Ham United	1–0	Olympic	3 November 1900
40	Earlestown	2–1	White Star Wanderers	3 November 1900

== Fourth qualifying round ==
	Home team	Score	Away team	Date
1	Darwen	2–1	Blackpool	17 November 1900
2	Watford	1–1	Queens Park Rangers	17 November 1900
2r	Queens Park Rangers	4–1	Watford	21 November 1900
3	Reading	11–0	Chesham Generals	17 November 1900
4	Chatham	2–2	Clapton	17 November 1900
4r	Clapton	5–1	Chatham	21 November 1900
5	Southport Central	2–0	Workington	17 November 1900
6	Middlesbrough	3–0	Jarrow	17 November 1900
7	Newark	0–5	Chesterfield	17 November 1900
8	Chirk	0–1	Walsall	17 November 1900
9	Burton Swifts	4–1	Hinckley Town	17 November 1900
10	Luton Town	9–1	Civil Service	17 November 1900
11	Swindon Town	2–2	Staple Hill	17 November 1900
11r	Swindon Town	6–0	Staple Hill	21 November 1900
12	Bishop Auckland	5–0	Wallsend Park Villa	17 November 1900
13	Stockport County	1–3	Crewe Alexandra	17 November 1900
14	New Brompton	1–1	West Ham United	17 November 1900
14r	West Ham United	4–1	New Brompton	21 November 1900
15	Wellington Town	4–0	Oswestry United	17 November 1900
16	Gresley Rovers	1–3	Kettering	17 November 1900
17	Barnsley	1–0	Lincoln City	17 November 1900
18	Brentford	0–1	Richmond Association	17 November 1900
19	Bristol Rovers	15–1	Weymouth	17 November 1900
20	Earlestown	2–3	Nantwich	17 November 1900

== Fifth qualifying round ==
	Home team	Score	Away team	Date
1	Reading	2–0	Richmond Association	8 December 1900
2	Walsall	6–0	Wellington Town	8 December 1900
3	Southport Central	1–1	Darwen	8 December 1900
3r	Darwen	2–0	Southport Central	11 December 1900
4	Crewe Alexandra	5–1	Nantwich	8 December 1900
5	Middlesbrough	4–0	Bishop Auckland	8 December 1900
6	Burton Swifts	1–2	Kettering	8 December 1900
7	Luton Town	3–0	Queens Park Rangers	8 December 1900
8	Barnsley	1–5	Chesterfield	8 December 1900
9	Bristol Rovers	5–1	Swindon Town	8 December 1900
10	West Ham United	1–1	Clapton	8 December 1900
10r	Clapton	2–3	West Ham United	12 December 1900
