= Donald Coles =

English footballer (1879–1941)

Personal information
- Full name: Donald Stratton Coles
- Date of birth: 29 July 1879
- Place of birth: Plymouth, England
- Date of death: 13 December 1941 (aged 62)
- Place of death: Hove, England
- Position: Right back

Youth career
- Ardingly College

Senior career*
Years	Team	Apps	(Gls)
- Burgess Hill
- Brighton Athletic
1900–1901	Brighton & Hove Rangers		
1901–1902	Brighton & Hove Albion	13	(2)
1902	Leicester Fosse	1	(0)
1902–1904	Brighton & Hove Albion	5	(0)
1905–1906	St Leonards United		
- * Club domestic league appearances and goals

Donald Stratton Coles (29 July 1879 – 13 December 1941) was an English professional footballer who played as a right back in the Football League for Leicester Fosse. He also played in the Southern League for Brighton & Hove Albion and St Leonards United.

== Life and career ==
Coles was born in Plymouth in 1879, the son of Robert Stratton Coles, a dental surgeon, and his wife Katherine Jane née Willmot. When his father took up practice in London, he sent Coles to be educated at Ardingly College in Sussex. He remained in the area after leaving school, and played amateur football for clubs including Burgess Hill, Brighton Athletic, Brighton & Hove Rangers, and Southern League Second Division club Brighton & Hove Albion. He had a brief spell with Leicester Fosse at the start of the 1902–03 season, during which he made one unsuccessful appearance in the Football League Second Division in a 5–0 defeat away to Chesterfield. Returning to Brighton & Hove Albion in December 1902, he turned professional, and made a further five appearances as his team were promoted to the First Division of the Southern League. He never played at the higher level, left the club in 1904, and ended his football career with St Leonards United, also of the Southern League Second Division.

The 1911 census records him living in a boarding house in Hove and working as an insurance agent. During the First World War he served as a private in the Royal Army Service Corps. He married Lilian Mash in 1930. The 1939 Register finds the couple living in Addison Road, Hove, with Coles working as a representative for a wine firm and as a commission agent. He was still resident at that address when he died two years later at the age of 62.
