= East Sussex Football League =

Association football league in England

- Founded: 1896
- Country: England
- Divisions: 5
- Number of clubs: 53
- Feeder to: Mid-Sussex Football League Premier Division; Southern Combination Football League Division Two
- League cup(s): East Sussex Challenge Cup; Division 1 & 2 Cup; Division 3 & 4 Cup; Macron Store Hastings Challenge Cup
- Current champions: Premier Division: Rye Town; Division One: Jesters Town; Division Two: Bexhill Rovers; Division Three: Parkfield; Division Four: Burwash (2023–2024)
- Website: FA Fulltime

The East Sussex Football League is an English association football competition for amateur teams based in East Sussex and south-west Kent. The league has a total of five divisions, headed by the Premier Division.

The league was formed in 1896 as the East Sussex Senior League, with the winners of the league competing for the Irish Rifle's Cup against the winners of the West Sussex League also founded in the same year. A second 'Junior' division was formed in 1899; however, by the 1908–09 season league membership was at an all-time low and the league went inactive for two seasons, reforming in 1911. The league was inactive during the First World War and Second World War, but has been running continuously since 1946.

In its early years the league was entered for by the most senior teams in East Sussex with the best sides from local leagues entering the competition. Over the course of its history the league has seen its geographical catchment area shrink due to the formation of the Mid-Sussex League and Brighton League, with the formation of the Sussex County League and additional divisions further up the pyramid affecting the standard of the league.

The league currently acts as a feeder to the Southern Combination Football League and the Premier Division of the Mid-Sussex Football League, with the top two teams who possess the required ground grading eligible to apply for promotion.

== History ==
The league was founded in 1896 consisting of seven founder members who were Brighton Athletic, Eastbourne Swifts, East Grinstead, Hailsham, Hastings, Lewes and North End Rangers (Brighton). The first winners of the competition were Hastings, who went on to compete for the Irish Rifle's Cup to become the champions of Sussex, losing out to Southwick, winners of the West Sussex League. An additional 'Junior' division, which primarily contained reserves teams of those in the 'senior' division, was created in 1899 and league membership remained steady throughout the early 1900s, but by the 1908–09 season there were only five teams playing in one division and the league was inactive for two seasons. The league reformed in 1911, but membership remained low until the competition was abandoned due to the outbreak of World War I in 1914.

The league returned after the First World War and enjoyed a steady membership throughout the 1920s and 1930s, with Rock-a-Nore, Rye United and Sidley United winning the league during the period; Hollington United and Hastings Rangers, who have a long association with the league, also enjoyed successful seasons. By 1939 the number of teams competing was up to 14, but the outbreak of World War II saw the league abandoned once again.

The league returned after the War for the 1946–47 season and the following seasons saw Hastings Rangers, Hollington United and Rye United dominate the league and other local competitions; however, the league would go onto lose Rye and Hastings to the newly formed Second Division of the Sussex County League in 1952, with Sidley United and Hastings & St Leonards also making the move. Hailsham won the league in the 1954–55 season and left to join the Sussex County League. The rest of the 1950s and 1960s was mostly dominated by Rye United Reserves, with Wadhurst winning the league in 1964 before joining the County League.

By the mid 1970s the league had expanded to five divisions, with a large number of teams joining from the Hastings League. During this period the league saw more clubs from the Eastbourne area and Kent also join the league. Teams from areas such as Alfriston, East Dean and Polegate played in the league during the 1970s, but numbers dwindled by the 1990s, with teams from this area seemingly opting to compete in the Mid-Sussex League. From Kent, teams like Tenterden, Hawkhurst United and Wittersham were successful in the 1970s and 1980s, with Hawkhurst still competing in the league.

In recent years the league has seen Shinewater Association, Wadhurst, Seaford, Westfield and Little Common enjoy league titles en route to the County League, with Langney Wanderers being the most recent club to do so in the 2012–13 season.

== Current structure ==
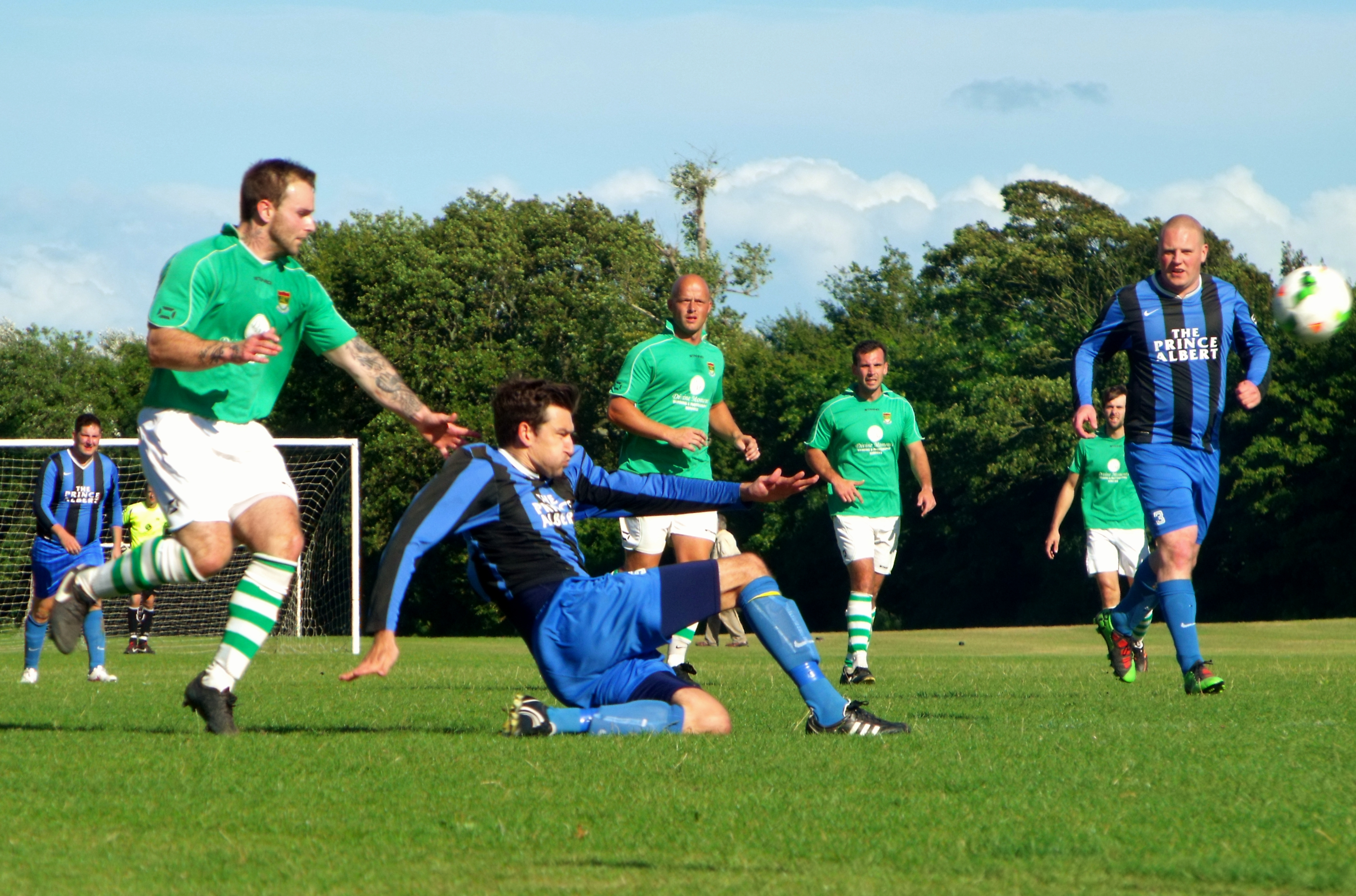
Eastbourne Albert vs Bexhill AAC

The most senior division in the league is the Premier Division which is at the intermediate level of football, whilst Divisions One to Five are at junior level. Reserve and third teams from clubs playing at a higher level have competed in the league throughout its history, with Bexhill United, Little Common, Langney Wanderers and Westfield all having fielded reserve and third teams in recent seasons. The league acts a feeder to the Southern Combination League, though it is likely that any teams based in Kent would join the Southern Counties East. In the past the Hastings League and Eastbourne League would have acted as feeders to the league, before their demise due to low numbers. Any teams transferring to and from the league typically transfer from neighbouring leagues of similar standard, such as the Mid-Sussex League, Ashford & District League and the Kent County League.

The league is currently sponsored by Macron Store Hastings, which provides all match balls for teams in the league, having previously been sponsored by the ADA restaurant, based in Hastings. Two of the three league cup competitions are also sponsored, with the East Sussex Challenge Cup, sponsored by Premier Travel and the Division Two & Three Cup sponsored by Wisdens Sports; Division Four and Five Cup is currently not sponsored and known as the Chairman's Challenge Cup.

== League Cups ==
The league currently run three cup competitions, the most senior being the East Sussex Challenge Cup (Premier Travel Cup) founded in 1911 as an invitational trophy for teams in East Sussex, which is now competed for by teams in the Premier Division and Division One. Teams in the league also compete in the Hastings FA and Eastbourne FA run cup competitions, as well as the Robertsbridge Charity Cup competitions.

== Member clubs 2025–26 ==
Premier Division

- Battle Town
- Jesters Town
- Ninfield
- Rye Town
- Sandhurst
- Sidley United
- Westfield II

Division One

- Bexhill Amateur Athletic Club
- Crowhurst II
- Hawkhurst United
- Herstmonceux
- SC Pass & Move
- St Leonards Social
- Victoria Baptists
- Wadhurst United
- Westfield III

Division Two

- Battle Town II
- Catsfield
- Little Common II
- Mountfield United
- Northiam 75 II
- Parkfield
- Robertsbridge United
- The Junior Club Tackleway II

Division Three

- Bexhill Amateur Athletic Club II
- Burwash
- Hastings Athletic
- Hollington United II
- Icklesham Casuals
- Pevensey & Westham
- Sedlescombe Rangers
- The Junior Club Tackleway III
- Ticehurst
- Wittersham

Division Four

- Bexhill Amateur Athletic Club III
- Hawkhurst United II
- Herstmonceux II
- Hollington Hawks Youth
- Icklesham Casuals II
- Little Common III
- Ninfield II
- Northiam 75 III
- Robertsbridge United II
- St Leonards Social II

== Champions ==
Season	Champions
1896–97	Hastings
1897–98	Brighton Athletic
1898–99	Brighton Athletic

For the 1899–1900 season the league added a secondary 'Junior' Division.

Season	Senior Division	Junior Division
1899–1900	Hastings	Hastings Reserves
1900–1901	Hastings	Hastings Reserves

The 'Junior Division' was dropped ahead of the 1901–02 season.

Season	Champions
1901–02	Hastings
1902–03	St Leonards
1903–04	Hastings
1904–05	Newhaven & Cement Works
1905–06	Newhaven & Cement Works
1906–07	Eastbourne St Mary
1907–08	Rock–a–Nore
1908–09	Newhaven

The league was inactive for the 1909–10 and 1910–11 seasons.

Season	Champions
1911–12	St Leonards Amateurs
1912–13	St Leonards Amateurs
1913–14	Hastings & St Leonards Amateurs Reserves

Between 1915 and 1919 the competition was suspended due to the First World War.

Season	Champions
1919–20	Not known
1920–21	Bexhill Town
1921–22	Not known
1922–23	Rock–A–Nore
1923–24	Bexhill Town
1924–25	Rock–A–Nore
1925–26	Sidley United
1926–27	Hollington United
1927–28	Hastings & St Leonards 'A'
1928–29	Rock–A–Nore
1929–30	Hollington United
1930–31	Hellingly Hospital
1931–32	Hollington United
1932–33	Sidley United
1933–34	Rock–A–Nore
1934–35	Rye
1935–36	Hollington United
1936–37	Hastings Rangers
1937–38	Hastings Rangers
1938–39	Rye United

The league was split into two divisions for the 1939–40 season, with Hastings Rangers winning the play–off game between the Eastern and Western champions.

Season	Eastern Section	Western Section
1939–40	Hastings Rangers	Heathfield United

The league was abandoned due to World War II with the league resuming for the 1946–47 season.

Season	Champions
1946–47	Rye United
1947–48	Rye United
1948–49	Heathfield United
1949–50	Rye United
1950–51	Rye United
1951–52	Rye United
1952–53	Battle Rangers
1953–54	Hailsham
1954–55	Not known
1955–56	Hellingly Hospital
1956–57	Not known
1957–58	Rye United Reserves
1958–59	Rye United Reserves

For the 1959–60 season the league added a second division.

Season	Division One	Division Two
1959–60	Hellingly Hospital	Rye United 'A'
1960–61	Tunbridge Wells United 'A'	Rye United 'A'
1961–62	Wadhurst	Rye United 'A'
1962–63	Not known	
1963–64	Wadhurst	Rye United 'A'
1964–65	Rye United Reserves	Ore United
1965–66	Not known	
1966–67	Burwash	Rye United 'A'

Two more divisions were formed for the 1967–68 season.

Season	Division One	Division Two	Division Three	Division Four
1967–68	Old Centmodians	Spartak	Northiam	Ashburnham
1968–69	Rye United Reserves	Hailsham	St James Park	Hooe Reserves

Division Five was formed for the 1969–70 season.

Season	Division One	Division Two	Division Three	Division Four	Division Five
1969–70	Hailsham	St James Park	St James Park Reserves	Bohemia United	Hollington United Reserves

For the 1969–70 season Division One was split into Division One East and Division One West.

Season	Division One East	Division One West	Division Two	Division Three	Division Four	Division Five
1970–71	Rye United Reserves	Sidley United Reserves	Ninfield United	Albion United	Northeye	Polegate Reserves

For the 1971–72 season, the top teams of each Division One table was placed in the new Premier Division, whilst the other sides were put into Division One.

Season	Premier Division	Division One	Division Two	Division Three	Division Four	Division Five
1971–72	Tenterden	Hastings Rangers	Albion United	Apollo	Albion United Reserves	Seeboard TW Reserves
1972–73	Hooe	Albion United	Apollo	Albion United Reserves	Jarvis Brook	Seaford Athletic
1973–74	Tenterden	Not known				
1974–77	Not known					
1977–78	Westfield	Oak Road	Rye Athletic	Sandhurst	Laughton	Linton Athletic 'A'
1978–81	Not known					
1981–82	Wittersham	Hastings Civil Service	Hooe	Not known		
1982–83	Not known					
1983–84	Bodiam	Punnetts Town	Flimwell	Cosmos	Staplecross	Frant
1984–88	Not known					
1988–89	Rock–A–Nore	Not known				
1989–90	Rock–A–Nore	Not known				

Division Six was added during the 1990s, though which year it was added is currently unknown.

Season	Premier Division	Division One	Division Two	Division Three	Division Four	Division Five	Division Six
1990–91	Firehills	Not known					
1991–92	Shinewater Association	Not known					
1992–93	Wadhurst United	Not known					
1993–94	Hollington United	Not known					
1994–95	Hollington United	Not known					
1995–96	Hollington United	Not known					
1996–97	Polegate	Not known					
1997–98	Wadhurst United	Sandhurst	Old Centmodians	Bexhill AAC	Wadhurst United Reserves	Heathfield United	Pebsham Sibex
1998–99	Seaford	Old Centmodians	Westfield Reserves	Heathfield Hotspurs	Old Centmodians Reserves	Hastings Rangers	Wittersham Reserves
1999–2000	Rock–A–Nore	Hollington United Reserves	Heathfield Hotspurs	Heathfield United	Hastings Rangers	Firehills Seniors	Westfield 'A'

For the 2000–01 season, only the Premier Division completed the season, the rest of the league was abandoned due to a combination of adverse weather and the foot–and–mouth outbreak.

Season	Premier Division	Division One	Division Two	Division Three	Division Four	Division Five	Division Six
2000–01	Wadhurst United	Abandoned					
2001–02	Hollington United	Heathfield United	St Leonards Social	Hawkhurst United	Heathfield United Reserves	Little Common Reserves	Hellingly Hospital
2002–03	Wadhurst United	Punnetts Town	Hawkhurst United	Heathfield United Reserves	Sedlescombe	Herstmonceux	Castleham United
2003–04	Hollington United	Bodiam	The JC Tackleway	Sedlescombe	Castleham United	Battle Rangers Reserves	Wadhurst United 'A'
2004–05	Little Common	Eastbourne WMC	Heathfield Hotspurs	Old Hastonians	Crowhurst	Little Common 'A'	Bexhill United 'B'
2005–06	Hawkhurst United	Hollington United Reserves	Icklesham Casuals	Athletico	Hastings Rangers Reserves	Eastbourne Fishermen	Panako
2006–07	Hawkhurst United	Punnetts Town	Hastings Rangers	Little Common 'A'	Robertsbridge United	Cinque Ports	The Pelham
2007–08	Hollington United	Sedlescombe	Wheatsheaf	Benbow	Cinque Ports	The Wilton	Nelson Tigers
2008–09	St Leonards Social	Q Ball	Wadhurst United	Hurst	Nelson Tigers	Travaux	Guestling Rangers

For the 2009–10 season, the league formed Division Seven.

Season	Premier Division	Division One	Division Two	Division Three	Division Four	Division Five	Division Six	Division Seven
2009–10	St Leonards Social	Wadhurst United	Peasmarsh & Iden Reserves	Eastbourne Dynamos	Eastbourne Fishermen	Orington	Wadhurst United Reserves	Magham Down
2010–11	St Leonards Social	White Knight	Eastbourne Galaxy	St Helens	Orington	Burwash	AFC Sidley	Eastbourne Rangers
2011–12	Hollington United	Ninfield United	Ore Athletic	Orington	Sedlescombe Rangers Reserves	AFC Sidley	Eastbourne Rangers	Battle Baptists Reserves

The league dropped Division Seven ahead of the 2012–13 season

Season	Premier Division	Division One	Division Two	Division Three	Division Four	Division Five	Division Six
2012–13	Langney Wanderers	Hollington United Reserves	Crowborough Athletic 'A'	The JC Tackleway	Eastbourne Rangers	Bexhill AAC Reserves	Herstmonceux 'A'
2013–14	Hollington United	Sedlescombe Rangers	Little Chelsea	Old Hastonians	Bexhill–on–Sea	Little Common 'A'	Catsfield Reserves
2014–15	St Leonards Social	Hawkhurst United	Eastbourne Rangers	Sovereign Saints	Peasmarsh United	Mayfield	Orington

The league dropped Division Six ahead of the 2015–16 season

Season	Premier Division	Division One	Division Two	Division Three	Division Four	Division Five
2015–16	Peche Hill Select	Sidley United	Northiam 75	St Leonards Social Reserves	Bexhill Rovers	Parkfield
2016–17	Hollington United	Rye Town	Bexhill AAC	Hollington United Reserves	Sovereign Saints	Wittersham Reserves
2017–18	Hollington United	Bexhill AAC	Sovereign Saints	Punnetts Town	Bexhill AAC Reserves	Hampden Park
2018–19	Sidley United	Punnetts Town	Rock A Nore	Bexhill Rovers	Hampden Park	Little Common III
2019–20	Season abandoned					
2020–21	Season curtailed					
2021–22	Battle Town	Rye Town	Westfield Reserves	AFC Hollington	Ticehurst	Crowhurst Reserves

The league dropped Division Five ahead of the 2022–23 season

Season	Premier Division	Division One	Division Two	Division Three	Division Four
2022–23	Rye Town	Sandhurst	Ninfield	Crowhurst Reserves	Welcroft Park Rangers Reserves
2023–24	Rye Town	Jesters Town	Bexhill Rovers	Parkfield	Burwash
2024-25	Hollington United	Ninfield	Bexhill AAC II	Junior Club Tackleway II	Junior Club Tackleway III
