= West Ham Garfield F.C. =

West Ham Garfield
- Full name: West Ham Garfield Football Club
- Nickname: The Gars
- Founded: 1894
- Dissolved: 1908
- Ground: Thames Ironworks Cycle Ground
Home colours

West Ham Garfield Football Club was a football club based in West Ham, England.

== History ==
West Ham Garfield was formed in 1894. After their formation, the club joined the South Essex League. In 1897, West Ham Garfield won the West Ham Charity Cup, beating Thames Ironworks 1–0 in the final. The following year, the club won the competition for a second time, beating Ilford 1–0. In 1899, West Ham Garfield entered the FA Cup for the first time, beating Barking Woodville in the preliminary round before losing heavily at home to Sheppey United. Following the 1907–08 season, West Ham Garfield dissolved.

== Colours ==
The club's colours were red and black shirts.

== Ground ==
The club had something of a roaming existence, usually playing friendlies away from home; its first recorded ground was at Plaistow Road in West Ham. In September 1897 it secured the Thames Ironworks Cycle Ground at Plaistow. For the 1900–01 FA Cup first qualifying round against Olympic, West Ham Garfield used Ilford Sports Ground as their home venue, as the Park did not meet competition requirements.

== Records ==
- Best FA Cup performance: First qualifying round, 1900–01
