= Royston United F.C. =

Royston United
- Full name: Royston United Football Club

Royston United F.C. was an English association football club based in Royston, South Yorkshire, Barnsley, South Yorkshire.

== History ==
The club competed in the FA Cup in the early 1900s.

=== League and cup history ===
Royston Unitedl League and Cup history
Season	FA Cup
1900–01	1st qualifying round
1901–02	3rd qualifying round
1902–03	3rd qualifying round
1903–04	1st qualifying round

== Records ==
- Best FA Cup performance: 3rd qualifying round, 1901–02, 1902–03
