= Sussex County Football Association =

Area sporting organization with 19th century origins

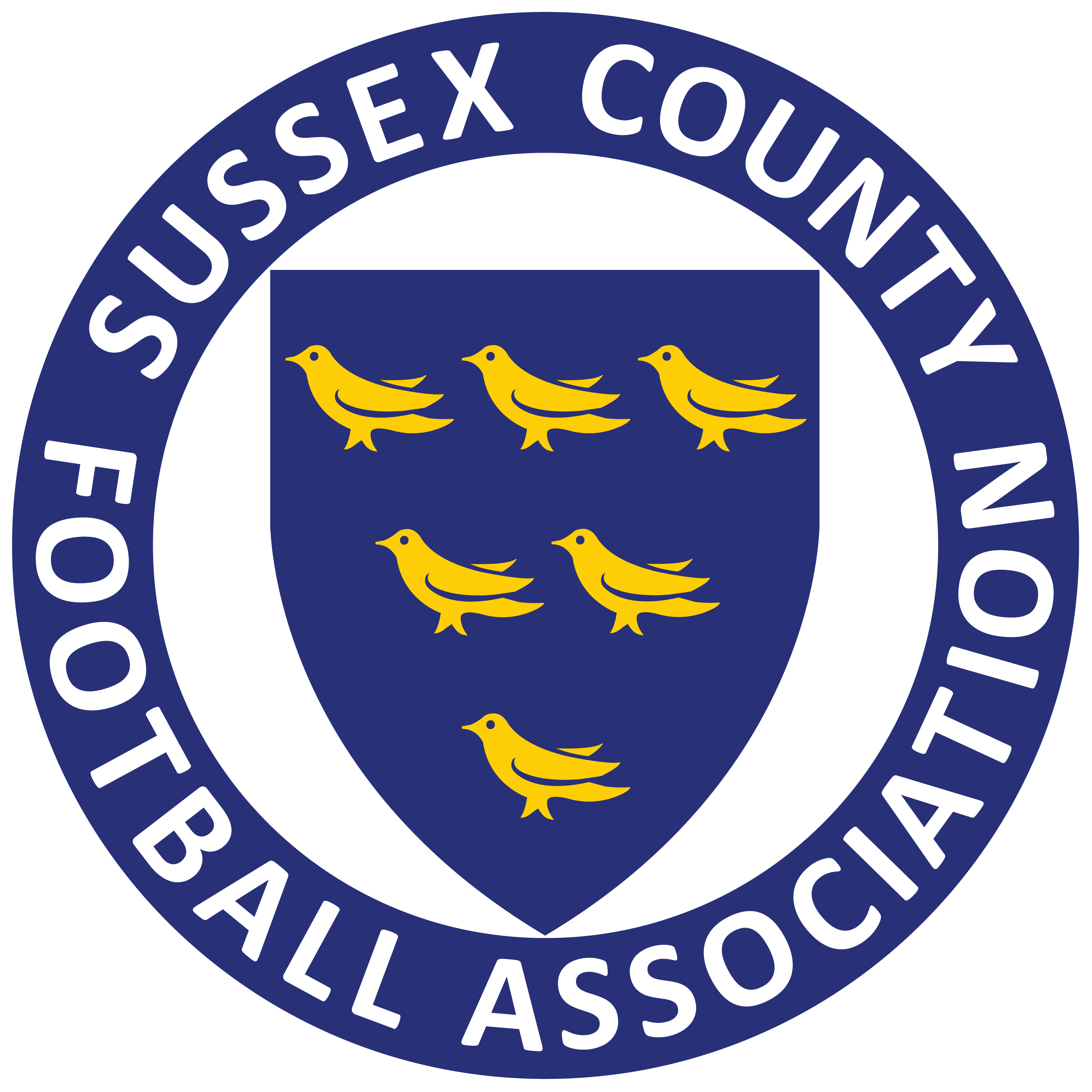
- The logo of the Sussex County FA
- Formation: 23 September 1882; 144 years ago
- Purpose: Football association
- Headquarters: Culver Road
- Location: Lancing BN15 9AX
- Region served: Sussex
- Chief executive: Thomas Lyons
- Chairman: Steve Walker
- Affiliations: The Football Association
- Website: www.sussexfa.com

The Sussex County Football Association, also simply known as Sussex County FA or Sussex FA, is the governing body of football in the county of Sussex, England. The Sussex County FA was founded on 23 September 1882 and run a number of County Cup competitions at various levels for teams all across the county. It is affiliated to The Football Association.

== History ==
Founded on 23 September 1882, the Sussex County FA was founded by several football clubs including Burgess Hill, Chichester City and Horsham. The 1882/83 season saw the Sussex FA create the Sussex Senior Cup, which was won for the first time by Brighton Rangers. The competition continues to run and is the longest-running football competition administered by the Sussex County FA.

Whilst the main aim of county football associations was to ensure clubs had many matches to play, a secondary aim was to help organise the recreation of schoolchildren. The Sussex County FA was formed at the time when parents in Sussex were pressing local schools to introduce games on Saturdays, with the intention of keeping children out of mischief.

In July 1981 the Sussex County FA purchased Lancing F.C., to which it moved its operations, effectively making Lancing F.C.'s home of Culver Road the headquarters of the Sussex County FA. On 2 November 1999 the Sussex County FA became incorporated as a private limited company. At this time, a new board of directors was created, with a second tier of volunteers called 'the Council', which was replaced in 2017 with 'County Members' and a series of working committees, designed to run football matters more effectively and inclusively.

In January 2024, Thura KT Win was appointed as Chair, taking the reins from the late Mathew Major, who died in April 2023.

== County leagues ==
The Southern Combination Football League, formerly known as the Sussex County League until 2015 is the highest level league in Sussex with the Premier Division winners being promoted to the Isthmian League or the Southern League. There are three divisions in the SCFL; Premier Division (level 9), Division One (level 10) and Division Two (level 11). Division Two being of intermediate level and a feeder league alongside the Mid-Sussex Football League. Other feeder leagues at level 12 and below include East Sussex, West Sussex and the. Brighton Worthing & District.

In addition there are also Sunday leagues and Youth leagues.

== Cup competitions ==
The Sussex County FA run several cup competitions:

=== Men's ===
- Sussex Senior Challenge Cup
- Sussex RUR Cup
- Sussex Community Shield

=== Women's ===
- Sussex Women's Challenge Cup
- Sussex Women's Challenge Trophy

There are also various other cups and trophies for all levels of football in Sussex.

=== Sussex Community Shield ===
The champions of the Southern Combination Football League and the winners of the Sussex Senior Challenge Cup play each other in this competition

Season	Winners	Final result	Runners-up	Venue	Attendance	Notes
2005	Crawley Town	2–1	Horsham YMCA	Gorings Mead	N/A	
2006	Horsham YMCA	0–0	Lewes	Gorings Mead	N/A	
2007	Brighton & Hove Albion	3–0	Eastbourne Town	The Saffrons	N/A	
2008	Crowborough Athletic	1–0	Brighton & Hove Albion	Alderbrook	N/A	
2009	Eastbourne Borough	4–0	Eastbourne United	Priory Lane	N/A	
2010	Whitehawk	2–3	Brighton & Hove Albion	Culver Road	N/A	
2011	Brighton & Hove Albion	4–0	Crawley Down Gatwick	Culver Road	N/A	
2012	Whitehawk	4–1	Three Bridge	Jubilee Field	N/A	
2013	Brighton & Hove Albion	3–1	Peacehaven & Telscombe	Falmer Stadium	N/A	
2015	Littlehampton Town	3–0	Whitehawk	Culver Road	N/A	
2016	Eastbourne Borough	3–0	Horsham	Priory Lane	N/A	
2017	Brighton & Hove Albion	7–0	Shoreham	American Express Elite Football Performance Centre	N/A	
2018	Haywards Heath Town	1–0	Brighton & Hove Albion	Culver Road	N/A	
2019	Bognor Regis Town	1–0	Chichester City	Culver Road	N/A	
2022	Brighton & Hove Albion	2–2, 4–3 pens	Littlehampton Town	Culver Road	N/A	
2023	Worthing	3–3, 5–4 pens	Broadbridge Heath	Culver Road	275	
2024	Horsham	5–0	Steyning Town	Culver Road	318	
2025	Horsham	2–0	Hassocks	Culver Road	275	

== Principals ==
Office-holders
Office	Name	Tenure
President	The Duke of Norfolk	1900–1920
President	Lord Leconfield	1920–1935
President	Sir Charles Kirkpatrick	1935–1937
President	S.C. Thompson	1937–1946
President	H.P. Brazier	1946–1947
President	H.A. Ayling	1947–1948
President	H.C. Hunt	1948–1949
President	H.B. Cox	1949–1950
President	A.E. Bailey	1950–1951
President	H.G. Cottrell	1951–1952
President	E.C. Martin	1952–1953
President	R.S. Chatfield	1953–1954
President	Sir Alan Saunders	1954–1955
President	Dr. John O'Hara	1955–1992
President	J.E. Davey	1992–2010
President	Les Kempster	2010–2023
President	John Edwards	2025-present
Chairman/person	Rev J. Walker	1882–1883
Chairman/person	Rev S. Walker	1883–1889
Chairman/person	George Cole	1889–1903
Chairman/person	R.H. Whittaker	1903–1905
Chairman/person	E.A. Newman	1905–1906
Chairman/person	E. Denne	1906–1907
Chairman/person	J.H. Jordan	1907–1908
Chairman/person	S.C. Thompson	1908–1909
Chairman/person	W.O. Norman	1909–1910
Chairman/person	C.F. Butcher	1910–1911
Chairman/person	R.N. Collins	1911–1912
Chairman/person	G.T. Apps	1912–1913
Chairman/person	H.B. Cox	1913–1914
Chairman/person	F.C. Winton	1914–1920
Chairman/person	H.A. Ayling	1920–1921
Chairman/person	G.E. West	1921–1922
Chairman/person	W. Stephens	1922–1923
Chairman/person	M.W.T. Ridley	1923–1924
Chairman/person	H.G. Cottrell	1924–1925
Chairman/person	A.E. Bailey	1925–1926
Chairman/person	W.B. Stone	1926–1927
Chairman/person	F.A. Cull	1927–1928
Chairman/person	J. Morrin	1928–1929
Chairman/person	H.G. Duvall	1929–1930
Chairman/person	H.J. Carnaghan	1930–1931
Chairman/person	A.G. Whittaker	1931–1932
Chairman/person	E. Ford	1932–1933
Chairman/person	H.F. Gentry	1933–1934
Chairman/person	P.F. Chambers	1934–1935
Chairman/person	F.C. Gates	1935–1936
Chairman/person	W.A. Grainger	1936–1937
Chairman/person	F.C. Wells	1937–1938
Chairman/person	R.H. Willmer	1938–1939
Chairman/person	D Noakes	1939–1944
Chairman/person	F.C. Winton	1944–1945
Chairman/person	H.G. Cottrell	1945–1946
Chairman/person	F.J. Comber	1946–1947
Chairman/person	G. Aucock	1947–1948
Chairman/person	J.T. Mengham	1948–1949
Chairman/person	J. Rabson	1949–1950
Chairman/person	A.C. Cruttenden	1950–1951
Chairman/person	M.W. Simmonds	1951–1952
Chairman/person	F.C. Crouch	1952–1953
Chairman/person	J.E. Kibblewhite	1953–1954
Chairman/person	E.J. Wood	1954–1955
Chairman/person	J.C. Langmaid	1955–1956
Chairman/person	F.C. Sparkes	1956–1957
Chairman/person	A. Slee	1957–1958
Chairman/person	H.C. White	1958–1959
Chairman/person	W.M. Pritchard	1959–1960
Chairman/person	K.V. Baker	1960–1961
Chairman/person	R.E. Tarratt	1961–1962
Chairman/person	E. Walmsley	1962–1963
Chairman/person	A.C. Penny	1963–1964
Chairman/person	W.R. Dunlop	1964–1965
Chairman/person	M. Farncombe	1965–1966
Chairman/person	J.E. Davey	1966–1967
Chairman/person	H.A. Skinner	1967–1968
Chairman/person	C.C. Stevens	1968–1969
Chairman/person	P.G. Cunningham	1969–1970
Chairman/person	W.A. Saunders	1970–1971
Chairman/person	A. Holdstock	1971–1972
Chairman/person	A.C. Adfield	1972–1973
Chairman/person	R.G.T. Ginnaw	1973–1974
Chairman/person	R.P. Dudley	1974–1975
Chairman/person	R.A. Pavey	1975–1976
Chairman/person	T. Parry	1976–1977
Chairman/person	S.E.L. Viccars	1977–1978
Chairman/person	R.F. Wood	1978–1979
Chairman/person	G.H. Cannons	1979–1980
Chairman/person	K. Sommerville	1980–1981
Chairman/person	F.R. Stenning	1981–1982
Chairman/person	J. Ades	1982–1983
Chairman/person	P. Wilkins	1983–1984
Chairman/person	D.M. Bennett	1984–1985
Chairman/person	H.G. Brown	1985–1986
Chairman/person	P.R. Bentley	1986–1987
Chairman/person	P.B. Hiscox	1987–1988
Chairman/person	D.C.L. Chilton	1988–1989
Chairman/person	J.M. Smith	1989–1990
Chairman/person	L.J. Cornford	1990–1991
Chairman/person	M.G. Witherden	1991–1992
Chairman/person	P.J. Huggins	1992–1993
Chairman/person	D.M. Leonard	1993–1994
Chairman/person	D.N. Best	1994–1995
Chairman/person	J.R. Burns	1995–1996
Chairman/person	A.J. Woodland	1996–1997
Chairman/person	J.P.S. Cripps	1997–1998
Chairman/person	C.F.B. Groves	1998–1999
Chairman/person	A.K. Knight	1999–2000
Chairman/person	R.A. Pavey	2000–2004
Chairman/person	Peter Bentley	2003–2013
Chairman/person	Matthew Major	2013–2023
Chairman/person	Thura KT Win	2024–2026
Chairman/person	Steve Walker	2026-present
Deputy Chairman/person	P.R. Bentley	1999–2004
Deputy Chairman/person	P.M. Chaplin	2004–2013
Deputy Chairman/person	Matthew Major	2013
Deputy Chairman/person	E. Potter	2014–2015
Deputy Chairman/person	G.R. Flemmington	2015–2017
Deputy Chairman/person	John Edwards	2018–2024
Deputy Chairman/person	Steve Walker	2024-2026
Deputy Chairman/person	Steve Atkins	2026-present
Secretary	Sturgis Jones	1881–1882
Secretary	Rev. Spencer Walker	1882–1886
Secretary	F.C. Lingard	1886–1887
Secretary	Dr. C. Smith	1887–1888
Secretary	F. Pollock	1888–1889
Secretary	Rev. C.H. Bond	1889
Secretary	E.W. Everest	1889–1945
Secretary	F.C. Wells	1945–1956
Secretary	C.H. Izard	1956–1968
Secretary	R.F. Reeve	1968–1988
Secretary	D.M. Worsfold	1987–1999
Chief executive	Ken Benham	2000–2025
Chief executive	Thomas Lyons	2025-present
