= Herbert Smith (footballer, born 1877) =

English footballer

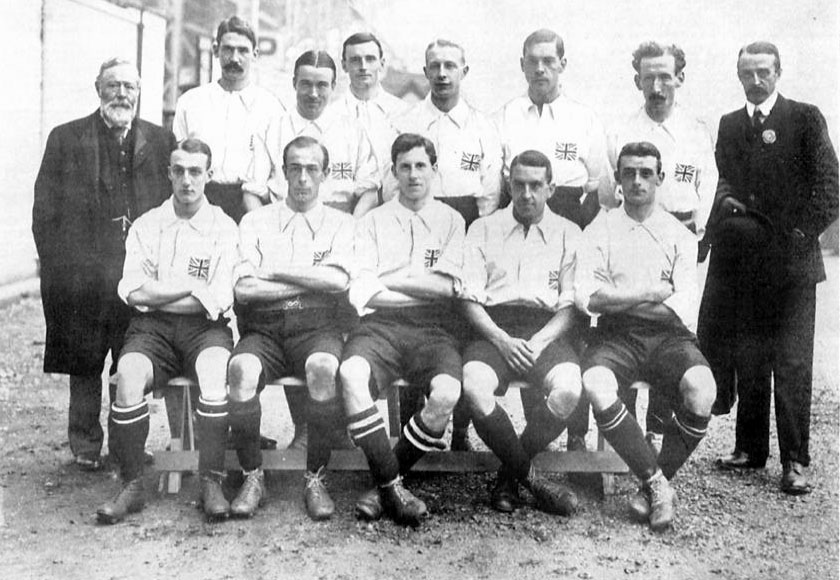
- The English amateur national team, winners of the football tournament at the 1908 Summer Olympics held in London. Standing, from left to right: FA president Lord Arthur Kinnaird, Kenneth Hunt, Walter Corbett, Herbert Smith, Horace Bailey, Frederick Chapman, Robert Hawkes, Alfred Davis (coach). Sitting, from left to right: Arthur Berry, Harold Stapley, Vivian Woodward, Clyde Purnell, Harold Hardman.

Personal information
- Full name: Herbert Smith
- Date of birth: 22 November 1877
- Place of birth: Witney, England
- Date of death: 6 January 1951 (aged 73)
- Position: Left back

Senior career*
Years	Team	Apps	(Gls)
1898	Witney		
1899	Richmond Association		
1900–1902	Reading		
1902–1903	Stoke	3	(0)
1903	Oxford City		
1903–1906	Reading		
1906–1907	Derby County	1	(0)
1907	Reading		
1908	Oxford City		

International career
1905–1906	England	4	
Medal record
Men's football
Representing Great Britain
Olympic Games
Gold medal – first place	1908 London	Team competition
- * Club domestic league appearances and goals

Herbert Smith (22 November 1877 – 6 January 1951) was an English footballer who played in the Football League for Derby County and Stoke. He also competed in the 1908 Summer Olympics, playing at left-back.

== Career ==
He was born in Witney, Oxfordshire, and was a member of the English team, which won the gold medal in the football tournament. He had previously made four appearances for the full England team in 1905 and 1906.

Smith played for a number of clubs including Reading and Oxford City as well as short spells with Football League clubs Stoke in 1902 and Derby County in 1906.

== Career statistics ==
=== Club ===
Appearances and goals by club, season and competition
Club	Season	League			FA Cup		Total	
Club	Season	Division	Apps	Goals	Apps	Goals	Apps	Goals
Stoke	1902–03	First Division	3	0	0	0	3	0
Derby County	1906–07	First Division	1	0	0	0	1	0
Career total			4	0	0	0	4	0

=== International ===
National team	Year	Apps	Goals
England	1905	2	0
England	1906	2	0
Total		4	0
