= Sean Howson =

Montserratian footballer

Personal information
- Date of birth: 25 November 1981 (age 44)
- Place of birth: Plymouth, Montserrat
- Height: 1.79 m (5 ft 10 in)
- Position: Forward

Senior career*
| Years | Team | Apps | (Gls) |
| 1998–2003 | Bata Falcons | 0 | (0) |
| 2003–2004 | Peacehaven & Telscombe | 32 | (3) |
| 2004–2009 | Hurstpierpoint | | |

International career
| 2004 | Montserrat | 3 | (0) |
- * Club domestic league appearances and goals

Sean Howson (born 25 November 1981) is a footballer who played as a forward. He made three appearances for the Montserrat national team.
