= St Bartholomew's and The Royal London Hospitals F.C. =

Association football club in England

St Bartholomew's and The Royal London Hospitals Football Club
- Nickname: SBLHFC
- Founded: 1996 through merger of two older sides Constituent elements: The London Hospital Medical College F.C. St. Bartholomew's Hospital Medical College F.C.
- Ground: Chislehurst Sports Ground
- Capacity: 500
- League: BUCS 4B
- Website: www.bartslondonfc.co.uk

St Bartholomew's and The Royal London Hospitals FC ("SBLHFC") are the football club of Barts and The London School of Medicine and Dentistry, having been formed from the merger of two formerly distinct hospital football clubs each with a long history.

== History ==
=== Football at St Bartholomew's Hospital ===
1882 kit

An association football club was formed at St Bartholomew's Hospital Medical College in 1879, the initiative coming in response to the start of inter-hospital competitions. St Bart's entered the FA Cup in 1881–82, and were drawn to face the five-time winners the Wanderers in the first round. However, the Wanderers were unable to field a team as their members - drawn from elite public schools such as Eton and Harrow - had chosen to play for their respective old boys' teams instead. It was the last time the Wanderers entered the FA Cup and St Bart's, playing in black shirts with the hospital crest on them, lost in the second round to Great Marlow.

The following year a United Hospitals club entered the Cup rather than each hospital sending a team, the Medicals beating the works side Olympic in the first round at Upton Park, scoring three times in the first twenty minutes, but lost at Windsor in the second, the home side scoring two goals in the final three minutes.

The club also reached the final of the London Senior Cup in 1890–91, beating Millwall in the semi-final, only to be beaten 6–0 by Royal Arsenal at the Oval.

United Hospitals kit

Until 1892 the various Athletic Clubs were separately maintained by the members of the individual clubs, with St Bart's playing at the Spotted Dog ground in Upton Park, but in 1892 it was finally decided that a fixed subscription should be paid by all students, and should be collected and administered by the School authorities. An entrance fee of five guineas entitled students to life membership of the Abernethian Society, Athletic, Boxing, Boating, Cricket, Lawn Tennis, Rugby, Swimming and Association Football Clubs which led to the acquisition of a sports ground by the College Committee at Winchmore Hill for £8,000 and a pavilion was erected and suitable pitches and tennis courts were laid out. The ground was taken over by the Amalgamated Clubs in 1895. Prior to the acquisition of the sports ground at Winchmore Hill, the club played their home games at the Spotted Dog ground at Upton Lane.

Around 1935, the students expressed the wish that the college would provide them with larger playing fields than those then in use at Winchmore Hill, as these were no longer adequate to meet the needs of the large number of students at the college. It was proposed, therefore, that an attempt be made to find a new ground, which would be large enough to cater for the student's sporting requirements, and in 1937 the college purchased a new site at Foxbury, Chislehurst in Kent (now South London).

The new sports ground in Chislehurst was bought to take into account the increased popularity of sport as part of a wider fitness craze and the growth of sporting societies at St Bartholomew's. Money was borrowed to build a pavilion and the student union was charged a higher rent. In June 1938 the pavilion was completed, and after the grounds had been leveled and returfed, three rugby pitches, and a football and hockey pitch were opened. Local residents were invited to the opening ceremony in an effort to ‘foster association’ with the hope of securing donations. Other sports facilities followed.

The site of the Medical College of St Bartholomew's at Charterhouse Square can also claim to be the birthplace of association football and Charterhouse football is regarded as a major influence in the development of the global game. Students at Charterhouse played football within the cloisters of the old Carthusian monastery and as space was limited the players depended on dribbling skills. Significantly, members of the football club at Charterhouse School at the Charterhouse Square site attended the original meeting of the Football Association in 1863 when it was decided by a group of interested teams to limit handling and hacking and to develop the art of football and St Bartholomew's Hospital were amongst their first opponents, visiting them as early as 1856.

=== Football at The London Hospital ===
Whilst football had been played at The London for many years previously, in 1893, for the first time, the students of The London had their own sports ground at Lower Edmonton which had been leased by the Clubs Union which itself had been founded in the same year. The college then later moved their sports ground to Hale End in Walthamstow which continued to be used and improved including the building of a new and better pavilion following its destruction by fire one night in 1956 until the merger and its later sale in 2000.

=== 1995 onwards - post-merger ===
The teams from Royal London Hospital and St Bartholomew's Hospital merged in 1995 following the union of St Bartholomew's Hospital Medical College and the London Hospital Medical College with Queen Mary and Westfield College, now known as Queen Mary, University of London to form St Bartholomew's and the Royal London School of Medicine and Dentistry. Likewise, St Bartholomew's and The Royal London Hospitals FC was formed and have since played at the previous ground of St Bartholomew's Hospital Medical College, Chislehurst following the sale of the previous ground of The London Hospital Medical College at Hale End by Queen Mary.

=== Past Club Presidents ===
Name	Year
Charlie Warren	2026/27
Kishen Guruparan	2025/26
Louis Robertson-Moro	2024/25
Shamiran Natdan	2023/24
Rayan Zafar	2022/23
Nikhil Sharma	2021/22
Diogo Preto	2020/21
Sepehr Heravi	2019/20
Ben Kerr	2018/19
James Eaton	2017/18
Tony Paluch	2016/17
Chris Briggs	2015/16
Theo Perkins	2014/15
Chris Pieri	2013/14
Andrew Clarke	2012/13
Adam Burt	2011/12
Sungjae Hwang	2010/11
Joseph Weston-Price	2009/10
Robert Stephenson	2008/09
Sonpreet Rai	2007/08
Adrian Conner	2006/07
Jaimin Patel	2005/06
James Sarkodieh	2004/05
Ashley Walden	2003/04
David Graham	2002/03
Tom Crompton	2001/02
Ed Caswell	2000/01
Dan Augustine	1999/2000
John Beachamp	1998/99
Greg Shaw	1997/98
Jeremy Mckenzie	1996/97
Mark Williams and Joe Hall	1995/96

== Team colours ==
The current colours are based on the colours of St Bartholomew's Hospital, black and white. The hospital's black and white shield has been the badge of St Bartholomew's Hospital for more than 500 years; it was the coat of arms used by John Wakering, the Master of the hospital from 1423 to 1462. The United Hospitals side wore magenta.

== Competition ==
The club currently has three teams who compete in the BUCS league and cups, the LUSL league and cups and the National Association of Medical Schools tournament. In addition, the 1st team compete in the UH Challenge Cup, the 2nd team in the UH Reserves Cup and the 3rd in the UH Vase with the other London Medical Schools: Royal Free, University College and Middlesex Medical Students FC, Imperial Medics FC, King's College School of Medicine FC & St. George's Hospital Medical School FC. The Challenge Cup has been won by St Bartholomew's Medical College FC on 12 occasions (the last in 1947) and by The London Hospital Medical College FC 16 times (the last in 1992). The most recent success was winning the UH Challenge Cup in 2024, by beating Imperial Medics.

- St Bartholomew's Medical College FC UH Challenge Cup Winners: 1889, 1890, 1892, 1893, 1895, 1896, 1911, 1922, 1930, 1947
- The London Hospital Medical College FC UH Challenge Cup Winners: 1887, 1898, 1899, 1905, 1956, 1957, 1958, 1963, 1967, 1971, 1974, 1975, 1976, 1977, 1986, 1987, 1992
- St Bartholomew's and The Royal London Hospital's FC UH Challenge Cup Winners: 2006, 2008, 2015, 2024

Since the merger of St Bartholomew's Medical College and The London Hospital Medical College with Queen Mary, University of London in 1996 the football club has also participated in the Merger Cup.

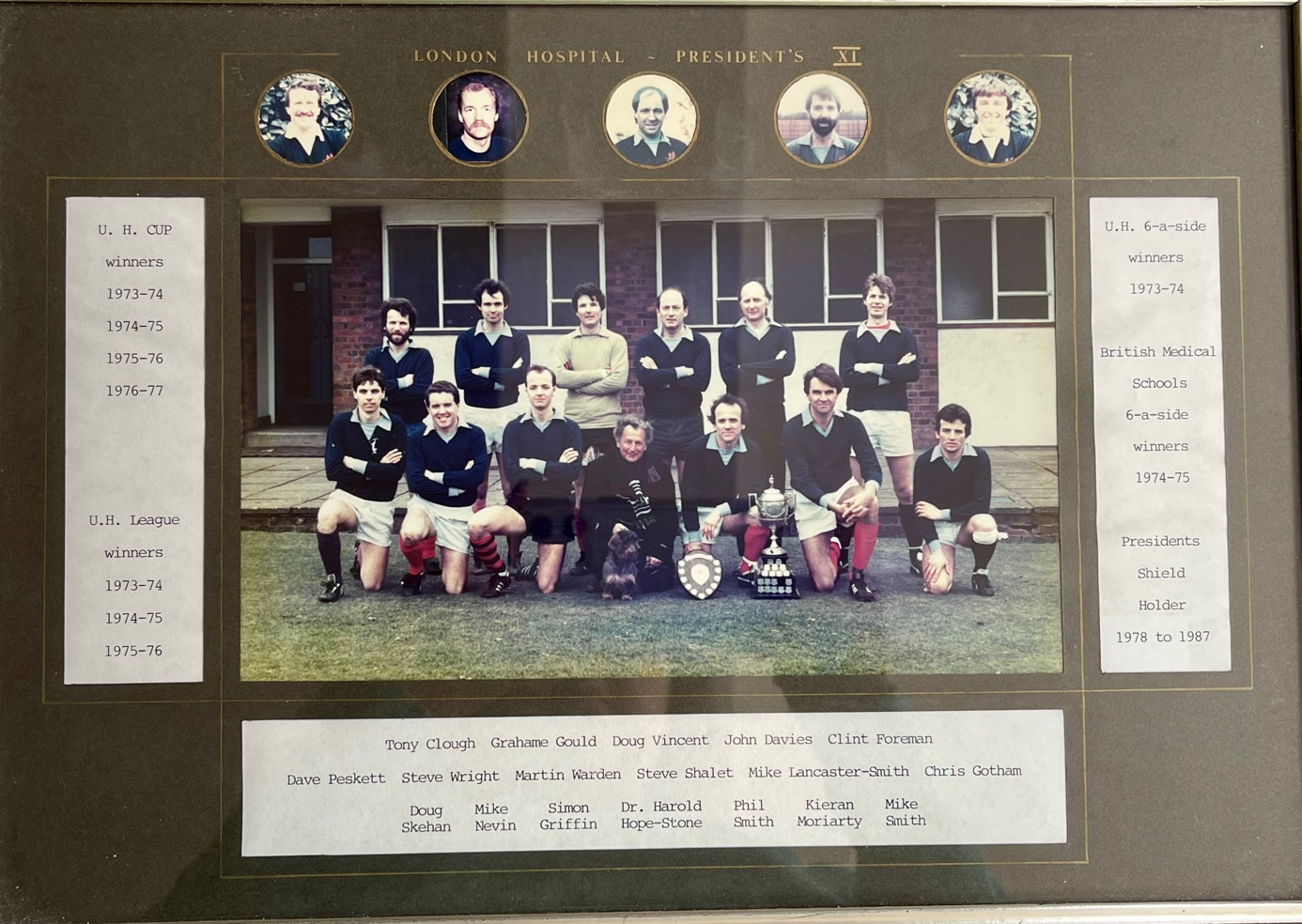
The London Hospital winning team 1974–77

== Chislehurst ==
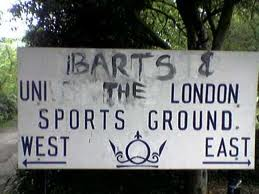
Chislehurst Entrance Sign

St Bartholomew's and The Royal London Hospitals FC play their home games on the east side of the Chislehurst site, the old ground of St Bartholomew's Hospital Medical College bought by the college in 1937. Current facilities include three football pitches, two rugby pitches, a cricket pitch and a grass tennis court. During the second world war the sports ground at Chislehurst was taken over by the Army and trenches were dug across the ground to prevent the landing of aeroplanes, but some pitches were usable and continued to be used.
