= Westfield F.C. (Sussex) =

Association football club in England

Westfield
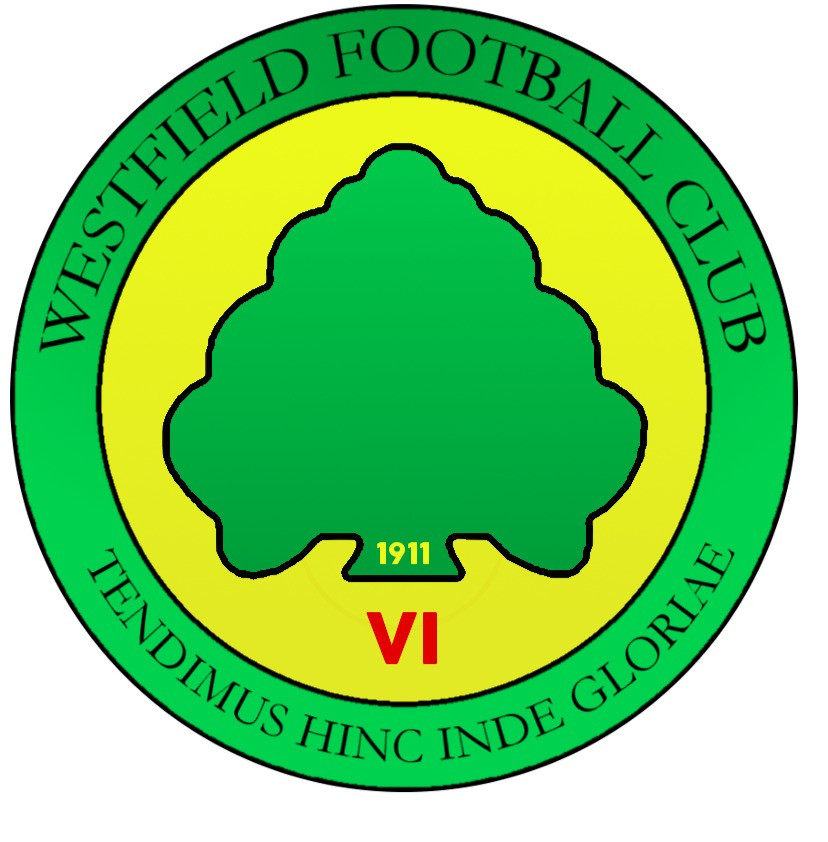
- Full name: Westfield Football Club
- Nickname: The Westies
- Founded: 1911
- Ground: The Parish Field, Westfield
- Capacity: 800
- Owner: Steve Cook
- Chairman: Jack Stapley
- Manager: Harry Stapley
- League: Southern Combination Division One
- 2025–26: Mid-Sussex League Premier Division, 1st of 12 (promoted)
Home colours	Away colours

Westfield Football Club are a football club based in Westfield, near Hastings, England. They were established before World War I. They joined the Sussex County Football League Division Three in 1997. Despite finishing outside the Sussex County Football League Division Two relegation places Westfield were relegated due to failing the ground grading regulations. They are currently members of the Southern Combination Division One and play at the Parish Field.

== History ==
Westfield joined Division Two of the East Sussex League in 1971, the finished runners up in 1972–73. The following season in Division One, they won a league and cup double, in 1977–78 in the Premier Division they won another league and cup double. However, by 1991 the club were back in Division Two of the league.

The club were admitted back into Division Three of the Sussex County League for the 1997–98 season. In the 1998–99 season, the club finished 4th and were promoted into Division Two. The club managed to reach the final of the Division Two Challenge Cup in the 2002–03 season, which saw them finish 6th in the league, they missed out to league champions and local rivals Rye & Iden United. The club finished in 3rd in 2006–07, however due to having no floodlights at their home ground, could not be promoted into Division One.

In June 2022, Premier League footballer Steve Cook bought a majority ownership in the club.

== Ground ==
Westfield play their home games at The Parish Field, Main Road, Westfield, East Sussex, TN35 4SB.

In 2009 a fire destroyed the clubhouse, which was built primarily from wood and dated back to the 1970s, the club have since installed temporary cabins to use as a temporary clubhouse.

In April 2021 work started on the Westfield Downs project which incorporates a new ground for the football club alongside new facilities for the village cricket club.

== Honours and achievements ==
- Sussex County League
- Sussex County League Division 2 Cup Runners up 2002/03
- Sussex County League Division 3 Runners Up 1998/99
- Sussex County League Reserve Section (East) Runners Up 2014/15
- East Sussex League
- East Sussex League Premier Division Winners 1977/78
- East Sussex League Premier Division Runners Up 1996/97
- Hastings League
- Hastings League Division One Winners 1956/57
- Hastings League Division One Runners Up 1946/47, 1955/56, 1957/58
- Hastings League Division Two Runners Up 1953/54
- Hastings League Division Three East Winners 1952/53
- Hastings League Division Three East Runners Up 1951/52
- Hastings & District FA
- Hastings Senior Cup Winners 2007/08, 2013/14
- Hastings Senior Cup Runners Up 2002/03, 2005/06
- Hastings FA Intermediate Cup Winners 1997/98, 2013/14, 2022/23
- Hastings FA Intermediate Cup Runners Up 1998/99
- Hastings FA Junior Cup Winners 1936/37, 1938/39, 1946/47, 1962/63
- Hastings FA Junior Cup Runners Up 1937/38

Mid Sussex Football League Premier Champions 25/26 Sussex Intermediate Cup Champions 25/26
