= Sussex RUR Cup =

Football competition

- Founded: 1897
- Region: Sussex
- Current champions: Haywards Heath Town (5th title)
- Most championships: Worthing (14 titles)

The Sussex Royal Ulster Rifles Charity Cup is the original Cup which was presented to the Sussex County FA in 1897 by the Officers and men of the Royal Irish Rifles (subsequently Royal Ulster Rifles). The 1st Battalion Royal Irish Rifles won the Sussex Senior Cup, Brighton Shield, Charity Cup and Vernon Wentworth Cup in 1895–96 and were recognised as ‘Sussex Champions’. The trophy was presented as a permanent memento of their achievement and to raise money for charity.

Since its inception in 1896–97, the Sussex (R.U.R) Charity Cup has had many different formats from an end of season invitation competition to its present knockout style. A third of all gate receipts from the matches played in the competition go to the SCFA Benevolent Fund for injured players.

== Winners and finalists ==
=== 1896–1914 ===
	Season	Winners	Runners-up	Final result	Venue	Attendance	Notes
1	1896–97	Southwick	North End Rangers	3–2	Beach House Park, Worthing	N/A	
2	1897–98	Brighton Athletic	Southwick	2–1	at Brighton Hornets F.C.	N/A	
3	1898–99	Brighton Athletic	Worthing	2–1	at Littlehampton F.C.	N/A	
4	1899–1900	Horsham	Hastings & St. Leonards	2–0	Beach House Park, Worthing	N/A	
5	1900–01	Hastings & St. Leonards	Horsham	4–1	The Saffrons	N/A	
6	1901–02	Hastings & St. Leonards	Horsham	5–2	Shoreham	N/A	
7	1902–03	Shoreham	Hastings & St. Leonards	4–3	Central Ground, Hastings	N/A	
8	1903–04	Worthing	Hastings & St. Leonards	3–2	Worthing Sports Ground	N/A	
9	1904–05	Newhaven	Shoreham	3–2 aet	Central Ground, Hastings	N/A	
10	1905–06	Shoreham	Newhaven	2–0	Worthing	N/A	
11	1906–07	Worthing	Eastbourne St. Marys	5–2	Goldstone Ground	N/A	
12	1907–08	Worthing	Rock-A-Nore	7–0	Goldstone Ground	N/A	
13	1908–09	Southwick	Newhaven	3–0	Goldstone Ground	N/A	
14	1909–10	Worthing	Newhaven	7–2	The Dripping Pan	N/A	
15	1910–11	Southwick	Lewes	1–0	Unknown	N/A	
16	1911–12	Vernon Athletic	Newhaven	3–0	Unknown	N/A	
17	1912–13	St Leonards Amateurs	Worthing	3–2	Unknown	N/A	
18	1913–14	Worthing	Lewes	4–1	Unknown	N/A	

=== 1919–1940 ===
	Season	Winners	Runners-up	Final result	Venue	Attendance	Notes
–	1915-1919	No competition - World War I					
19	1919–20	Brighton & Hove Amateurs	Eastbourne	2–1	The Saffrons	N/A	
20	1920–21	Worthing	Brighton & Hove Amateurs	2–0	The Sports Ground, Worthing	N/A	
21	1921–22	Vernon Athletic	Royal Corps of Signals	?	Unknown	N/A	
22	1922–23	Vernon Athletic	Southwick	3–2	at Worthing	N/A	Contested by the top 4 of County League
23	1923–24	Royal Corps of Signals	Vernon Athletic	1–0	Fort Road	N/A	
24	1924–25	Southwick	Hastings & St Leonards	2–1	Fort Road	N/A	
25	1925–26	Southwick	Eastbourne	2–1	The Saffrons	2,300	
26	1926–27	Worthing	Hastings	3–0	Fort Road	N/A	
27	1927–28	Southwick	Haywards Heath	8–1	Unknown	N/A	
28	1928–29	Southwick	Worthing	2–1	Goldstone Ground	N/A	
29	1929–30	Southwick	Worthing	7–1	Goldstone Ground	N/A	
30	1930–31	Horsham	Worthing	3–1	Goldstone Ground	N/A	
31	1931–32	Horsham	Worthing	6–1	Goldstone Ground	N/A	
32	1932–33	Eastbourne	Horsham	5–4	Goldstone Ground	N/A	
33	1933–34	Horsham & Worthing (Shared Trophy)		1–1	Goldstone Ground	N/A	
34	1934–35	Horsham	2nd Battalion R.U.R.	5–2	Goldstone Ground	N/A	
35	1935–36	Horsham	Worthing	9–0	Goldstone Ground	N/A	
36	1936–37	Horsham	Southwick	6–1	Goldstone Ground	N/A	
37	1937–38	Horsham & Southwick (Shared Trophy)		2–2	Goldstone Ground	N/A	
38	1938–39	Hastings & St. Leonards	Worthing	6–1	Goldstone Ground	N/A	
39	1939–40	Worthing	Hastings & St. Leonards	1–1 aet 4–1	Unknown	N/A	

=== 1941–1945 ===
	Season	Winners	Runners-up	Final result	Venue	Attendance	Notes
–	1940–41	No competition - World War II					
40	1941–42	Worthing	Haywards Heath	3–1	Victoria Park (Haywards Heath)	N/A	
41	1942–43	Brighton & Hove Albion Juniors	Worthing	4–3	Goldstone Ground	N/A	
42	1943–44	Haywards Heath	R.A.F. XI	4–3	Victoria Park (Haywards Heath)	N/A	
43	1944–45	Worthing	Brighton & Hove Albion Juniors	3–1	Unknown	N/A	

=== 1945–1960 ===
	Season	Winners	Runners-up	Final result	Venue	Attendance	Notes
44	1945–46	Horsham	Eastbourne	4–1	Unknown	N/A	
45	1946–47	Littlehampton Town	Hastings & St Leonards	2–0	Unknown	N/A	
46	1947–48	Eastbourne	Horsham	5–3	Goldstone Ground	N/A	
47	1948–49	Horsham & Worthing (Shared Trophy)		1–1	Queen Street	N/A	
48	1949–50	Eastbourne	Haywards Heath	6–0	Goldstone Ground	N/A	
49	1950–51	Horsham	Haywards Heath	5–2	Queen Street	N/A	
50	1951–52	Horsham	Haywards Heath	3–2	Unknown	N/A	
51	1952–53	Worthing	Chichester City	5–1	Goldstone Ground	N/A	
52	1953–54	Worthing	Shoreham	5–2	Culver Road	N/A	
53	1954–55	Whitehawk & Manor Farm Old Boys	Eastbourne United	1–0	Goldstone Ground	N/A	
54	1955–56	Eastbourne United	Eastbourne	6–0	The Oval, Eastbourne	N/A	
55	1956–57	Horsham	Whitehawk & Manor Farm Old Boys	2–0	Hanbury Park	N/A	
56	1957–58	Bexhill Town Athletic	Shoreham	7–1	Hanbury Park	N/A	
57	1958–59	Whitehawk	Bognor Regis Town	4–2	Woodside Road	N/A	
58	1959–60	Brighton & Hove Albion	Arundel	6–0	Woodside Road	N/A	

=== 1960–1975 ===
	Season	Winners	Runners-up	Final result	Venue	Attendance	Notes
59	1960–61	Brighton & Hove Albion & Chichester City (Shared trophy)		?	Unknown	N/A	
60	1961–62	Lewes	Haywards Heath	4-2	Unknown	N/A	
61	1962–63	Lewes	Chichester City	3–2	Unknown	N/A	
62	1963–64	Chichester City	Eastbourne	2–0	Unknown	N/A	
63	1964–65	Lewes	Shoreham	4–2	Unknown	N/A	
64	1965–66	Lancing	Rye United	3–0	Unknown	N/A	
65	1966–67	Haywards Heath	Seaford Town	8–1	Unknown	N/A	
66	1967–68	Rye United	Haywards Heath	3–1	Unknown	N/A	
67	1968–69	Arundel	Southwick	3–1	Woodside Road	N/A	
68	1969–70	Littlehampton Town	Rye United	2–0; 5–3	The Dripping Pan	N/A	First game abandoned
69	1970–71	Littlehampton Town	Ringmer	1–0	Old Barn Way	N/A	
70	1971–72	Bognor Regis Town	Chichester City	1–0	at Littlehampton	N/A	
71	1972–73	Arundel	Southwick	3–0	Woodside Road	N/A	
72	1973–74	Bexhill Town	Seaford Town	1–0	Unknown	N/A	
73	1974–75	Haywards Heath	East Grinstead	4–1	The Dripping Pan	N/A	

=== 1975–1990 ===
	Season	Winners	Runners-up	Final result	Venue	Attendance	Notes
74	1975–76	Haywards Heath	Wick	2–0	Queen Street	N/A	
75	1976–77	Southwick	Littlehampton	1–0	Woodside Road	N/A	
76	1977–78	Peacehaven & Telscombe	Burgess Hill Town	1–0	Old Barn Way	N/A	
77	1978–79	Arundel	Ringmer	2–0	Old Barn Way	N/A	
78	1979–80	Arundel	Hastings Town	1–0	The Caburn Ground	N/A	
79	1980–81	Steyning Town	Peacehaven & Telscombe	2–1 aet	Culver Road	N/A	
80	1981–82	Peacehaven & Telscombe	Littlehampton Town	2–1	Culver Road	N/A	
81	1982–83	Three Bridges	Hastings Town	3–2	Culver Road	N/A	
82	1983–84	Littlehampton Town	Southwick	2–1	Culver Road	N/A	
83	1984–85	Steyning Town	Portfield	1–1 aet 2–1	Culver Road	N/A	
84	1985–86	Eastbourne Town	Steyning Town	3–0	Culver Road	N/A	
85	1986–87	Eastbourne Town	Arundel	1–0	Culver Road	N/A	
86	1987–88	Three Bridges	Hailsham Town	2–1	Culver Road	N/A	
87	1988–89	Pagham	Littlehampton Town	1–0 aet	Culver Road	N/A	
88	1989–90	Wick	Peacehaven & Telscombe	3–0	Culver Road	N/A	

=== 1990–2005 ===
	Season	Winners	Runners-up	Final result	Venue	Attendance	Notes
89	1990–91	Whitehawk	Peacehaven & Telscombe	2–1	Culver Road	N/A	
90	1991–92	Burgess Hill Town	Ringmer	2–1	Culver Road	N/A	
91	1992–93	Peacehaven & Telscombe	Lancing	2–1	Culver Road	N/A	
92	1993–94	Newhaven	Pagham	4–0	Culver Road	N/A	
93	1994–95	Peacehaven & Telscombe	STAMCO	1–0	Culver Road	N/A	
94	1995–96	Peacehaven & Telscombe	Saltdean United	1–0	Culver Road	N/A	
95	1996–97	Peacehaven & Telscombe	Shoreham	3–3; 4–0	Culver Road	N/A	
96	1997–98	Wick	Shoreham	3–2	Culver Road	N/A	
97	1998–99	Wick	Burgess Hill Town	1–0	Culver Road	N/A	
98	1999–2000	Burgess Hill Town	Saltdean United	3–0	Culver Road	N/A	
99	2000–01	Horsham YMCA	Burgess Hill Town	3–0	Culver Road	N/A	
100	2001–02	Selsey	Arundel	2–0	Culver Road	N/A	
101	2002–03	Southwick	Sidley United	2–1	Culver Road	N/A	
102	2003–04	East Grinstead Town	Three Bridges	4–0	Culver Road	N/A	
103	2004–05	Ringmer	Chichester City United	1–0	Culver Road	N/A	

=== 2005–2020 ===
	Season	Winners	Runners-up	Final result	Venue	Attendance	Notes
104	2005–06	Hailsham Town	Whitehawk	2–0	The Saffrons	N/A	
105	2006–07	Chichester City United	Whitehawk	2–0	Culver Road	N/A	
106	2007–08	Three Bridges	Selsey	4–0	Culver Road	N/A	
107	2008–09	Eastbourne United Association	Rustington	4–1	Culver Road	N/A	
108	2009–10	Peacehaven & Telscombe	Wick	6–1	Culver Road	N/A	
109	2010–11	Crawley Down Gatwick	AFC Uckfield Town	2–0	Culver Road	N/A	
110	2011–12	Rye United	Selsey	2–0	Culver Road	N/A	
111	2012–13	East Preston	Broadbridge Heath	1–0	Culver Road	N/A	
112	2013–14	Horsham YMCA	East Preston	0–0, 5–4 pens	Culver Road	N/A	
113	2014–15	Eastbourne Town	Loxwood	2–1	Culver Road	N/A	
114	2015–16	Newhaven	Chichester City	4–2	Culver Road	N/A	
115	2016–17	Newhaven	Crawley Down Gatwick	5–0	Culver Road	N/A	
116	2017–18	Chichester City	Pagham	4–0	Culver Road	N/A	
117	2018–19	Peacehaven & Telscombe	Haywards Heath Town	3–0	Culver Road	N/A	
–	2019–20	Competitions cancelled due to COVID-19 pandemic					

=== 2020– ===
	Season	Winners	Runners-up	Final result	Venue	Attendance	Notes
–	2020–21	Competitions cancelled due to COVID-19 pandemic					
118	2021–22	Littlehampton Town	Saltdean United	2–0	Culver Road	782	
119	2022–23	Peacehaven & Telscombe	Broadbridge Heath	1–0	Culver Road	302	
120	2023–24	Horsham YMCA	Haywards Heath Town	1–1, 11–10 pens	Culver Road	314	
121	2024-25	Crowborough Athletic F.C.	Eastbourne United A.F.C.	3-1	Culver Road	280	
122	2025-26	Haywards Heath Town	Worthing United	3-0	Culver Road	524	

== Records ==
- Most wins: 14:
  - Worthing (1904, 1907, 1908, 1910, 1914, 1921, 1927, 1934, 1940, 1942, 1945, 1949, 1953, 1954)
- Most consecutive wins: 5
  - Horsham (1934, 1935, 1936, 1937, 1938)
- Most appearances in a final: 23
  - Worthing
- Most consecutive appearances in a final: 8
  - Horsham (1931, 1932, 1933, 1934, 1935, 1936, 1937, 1938)
- Most defeats in a final: 9
  - Worthing
  - Haywards Heath Town
- Biggest win: 9 goals:
  - Horsham 9–0 Worthing (1936)
- Most goals in final: 9:
  - Worthing 7–2 Newhaven (1910)
  - Southwick 8–1 Haywards Heath (1928)
  - Eastbourne 5–4 Horsham (1933)
  - Horsham 9–0 Worthing (1936)
  - Haywards Heath 8–1 Seaford Town (1967)

== Statistics ==
=== Performance by club ===
Club	Winners	Runners up	Winning years
Worthing	14	9	1904, 1907, 1908, 1910, 1914, 1921, 1927, 1934, 1940, 1942, 1945, 1949, 1953, 1954
Horsham	13	4	1900, 1931, 1932, 1934, 1935, 1936, 1937, 1938, 1946, 1949, 1951, 1952, 1957
Southwick	11	6	1897, 1909, 1911, 1925, 1926, 1928, 1929, 1930, 1938, 1977, 2003
Peacehaven & Telscombe	9	3	1978, 1982, 1993, 1995, 1996, 1997, 2010, 2019, 2023
Eastbourne Town	6	5	1933, 1948, 1950, 1986, 1987, 2015
Haywards Heath Town	5	9	1944, 1967, 1975, 1976, 2026
Littlehampton Town	5	3	1947, 1970, 1971, 1984, 2022
Chichester City	4	5	1961, 1964, 2007, 2018
Newhaven	4	4	1905, 1994, 2016, 2017
Arundel	4	3	1969, 1973, 1979, 1980
Whitehawk	3	3	1955, 1959, 1991
Lewes	3	2	1962, 1963, 1965
Wick	3	2	1990, 1998, 1999
Brighton & Hove Albion	3	1	1943, 1960, 1961
Three Bridges	3	1	1983, 1988, 2008
Vernon Athletic	3	1	1912, 1922, 1923
Horsham YMCA	3	0	2001, 2014, 2024
Shoreham	2	6	1903, 1906
Burgess Hill Town	2	3	1992, 2000
Hastings & St Leonards	2	3	1901, 1902
Rye United	2	2	1968, 2012
Eastbourne United	2	1	1956, 2009
Steyning Town	2	1	1981, 1985
Brighton Athletic	2	0	1898, 1899
Bexhill United	2	0	1958, 1974
Hastings United	1	5	1939
Ringmer	1	3	2005
Pagham	1	2	1989
Selsey	1	2	2002
Bognor Regis Town	1	1	1972
Brighton Amateurs	1	1	1920
Crawley Down Gatwick	1	1	2011
East Grinstead Town	1	1	2004
East Preston	1	1	2013
Hailsham Town	1	1	2006
Lancing	1	1	1966
Royal Corps of Signals	1	1	1924
St Leonards Amateurs	1	0	1913
Crowborough Athletic F.C.	1	0	2025
Broadbridge Heath	0	2	–
Seaford Town	0	2	–
Worthing United	0	1	$-$
2nd Battalion Royal Ulster Rifles	0	1	–
AFC Uckfield Town	0	1	–
Loxwood	0	1	–
Portfield	0	1	–
Royal Air Force XI	0	1	–
Rustington	0	1	–
Saltdean United	0	3	–
Sidley United	0	1	–
STAMCO	0	1	–

== See also ==
- Sussex Senior Cup
- Sussex County Football Association
- Sport in Sussex
