= Brighton Athletic F.C. =

Association football club (1885–1902)

- Full name: Brighton Athletic Football Club
- Founded: 1885
- Dissolved: 1902
- Ground: Preston Fields
- Secretary: W. Henderson
Home colours

Brighton Athletic F.C. was an association football club from Brighton, Sussex, active in the late 19th century.

== History ==
The club was formed in 1885, as a footballing side within the Brighton Athletic Club, and originally used the full Brighton Athletic Club name. A proposal to merge the new club in 1886 with the longer-established Brighton F.C. foundered when the Athletic insisted on keeping the Athletic element in the merged entity's identity, and later in the year the club was being referred to solely as Brighton Athletic.

It was a founder member of the East Sussex Football League in 1896, and won the title and the Royal Irish Rifles Cup - at the time played between the champions of the East and West Sussex Leagues - in 1897–98 (against Southwick) and 1898–99 (against Worthing), both times the club winning 2–1 after being behind at half-time. The club however never won the Sussex Senior Cup, its closest call coming in 1897–98, when it lost 1–0 in the semi-final to Hastings & St Leonards, when being considered "certain to win".

It played in the FA Cup qualifying rounds from 1899–1900 to 1901–02, on each occasion losing to a Brighton side in the qualifying rounds; in its first two entries it beat Eastbourne Swifts in the preliminary round, but lost in turn to Southern League clubs Brighton United, Brighton & Hove Rangers, and Brighton & Hove Albion.

The club reported a positive 1901–02 season, which included an eighth Brighton Challenge Shield victory and a runner-up finish in the League, but it had been a season of two halves, the season coming close to collapse after "the defence was broken up" early in 1902 with players moving on.

=== Brighton Amateurs ===
The club started the 1902–03 season in the senior division of the East Sussex League, and had entered the 1902–03 FA Cup. On 11 September 1902, at the urging of Councillor E. M. Marx, who suggested the town needed a first-rate amateur side, the club merged with fellow Senior division side Brighton Hornets, under the name Brighton Amateurs. Although an attempt to retain the Brighton Athletic name was defeated by 9 votes to 5, the merger was more of a takeover, as the new entity retained the Athletic's Sussex League fixtures and colours, although the Preston Park ground which the Amateurs used was also the home of the Hornets. Also both club secretaries (Athletic's Henderson and Hornets' F. W. Wilson) agreed to take on a joint role.

== Colours ==
The club wore ruby and myrtle green shirts, with white also included in the club colours, probably as knickers/shorts.

== Ground ==
The club played at Preston Park, using the Argyle Arms as its base.

== Notable players ==
- Notable players ( 2 )
