= Peacehaven & Telscombe F.C. =

Association football club in England

Peacehaven & Telscombe
- Full name: Peacehaven & Telscombe Football Club
- Nickname: The Tye
- Founded: 1923
- Ground: The Sports Park, Peacehaven
- Capacity: 3,000 (350 seated)
- Coordinates: 50°47′36″N 0°0′47″E
- Chairman: The Fans (community owned)
- Manager: Mark Shutt
- League: Isthmian League South East Division
- 2025–26: Southern Combination Premier Division, 5th of 20 (promoted via play-offs)
- Website: https://pt-fc.com/
Home colours	Away colours

Peacehaven & Telscombe Football Club is a football club based in Peacehaven, East Sussex, England. The club is affiliated to the Sussex County Football Association. The club are currently members of the Isthmian League South East Division and play at the Sports Park.

== History ==
Although officially the club was formed in 1923 as a result of a merger between Peacehaven Rangers and Telscombe Tye. It is recorded that a number of games were played in 1922 following a meeting of interested players in June of that year. After the second world war the club joined Junior Division One of the Brighton, Hove & District Football League for the start of the 1949–50 campaign finishing runners up at the first attempt. Two seasons later the club achieved promotion to the Intermediate division when they finished as champions of the Junior Division One, and gained further promotion the next season when they finished runners-up in the Intermediate division. The club could only survive two seasons in the Senior division before being relegated back to the intermediate division at the end of the 1954–55 competition.

Four seasons later the club were promoted back to the Senior division when they finished runners-up, but as before they could only survive two seasons in the top division before being relegated again. The 1963–64 season saw the club promoted back to the Senior division as champions of the Intermediate division. The club would then go on to win the Senior division five seasons later, without losing a single game.

The Senior division win in the Brighton league enabled the club to be promoted to Division Two of the Sussex County Football League, for the start of the 1969–70 season. Their fourth season in Division Two, the 1972–73 campaign, saw the club make their debut in the FA Cup, where they beat Burgess Hill Town in the First Qualifying round before losing to Lewes in the next round. The 1975–76 season saw the club gain promotion to Division One for the first time, when they finished runners up behind Selsey.

In their third season, 1978–79, in Division One the club finished as champions of the Sussex County League. The club went on to remain in Division One for another nineteen seasons during which time they went on to win the league title a further six times. Two seasons after winning the last of these six titles, the 1997–98 campaign saw the club relegated to Division Two. Three seasons later the club were promoted as runners-up of Division Two, but could only last two seasons back in Division One.

Two seasons after being relegated from Division One, the club was relegated to Division Three for the first time in their history. The next season saw them become champions of Division Three in the 2005–06 season, earning promotion back to Division Two. The club was back in Division One three seasons later when under manager Darren Guirey, they earned promotion as champions of Division Two. The club achieved further success at the end of the 2012–13 campaign the club won the Sussex county league for the eighth time in their history and earning themselves promotion to the Isthmian League. In 2013–14, the club won the Isthmian League Division One South and earned a second successive promotion, reaching the Isthmian Premier Division.

They were subsequently relegated back down to the Southern Combination Football League Premier Division.

=== Supporter ownership and recent history ===
In June 2016, the club was purchased by a community group representing fans of the club..

In 2023, the club won the Sussex RUR Cup and reached the quarter finals of the FA Vase for a second time in 2022-23. In 2026, Peacehaven finished fifth in the Southern Combination Premier Division, and qualified for the playoffs to the Isthmian League. Beating second-place Haywards Heath Town FC 1-0 away in the semi-final, the club faced third-placed Guernsey FC in the delayed playoff final on the 23 May at Victoria Park in Guernsey, securing promotion to the Isthmian League South East division with a 4-1 away victory in front of over 1,600 fans..

== Ground ==
Peacehaven & Telscombe play their home games at Sports Park, Piddinghoe Avenue, Peacehaven, East Sussex.

== Honours ==
=== League honours ===
- Isthmian League Division One South:
  - Champions (1): 2013–14
- Southern Combination Football League Premier Division:
  - Playoff Winners (1): 2025-26
- Sussex County Football League Division One:
  - Champions (8): 1978–79, 1981–82, 1982–83, 1991–92, 1992–93, 1994–95, 1995–96, 2012–13
  - Runners-up (3): 1977–78, 1980–81, 1990–91, 2009–10
- Sussex County Football League Division Two:
  - Champions (1): 2008–09
  - Runners-up (2): 1975–76, 2000–01
- Sussex County Football League Division Three:
  - Champions (1): 2005–06
- Brighton, Hove & District Football League Senior Division:
  - Champions (1): 1968–69
  - Runners-up (1): 1966–67
- Brighton, Hove & District Football League Intermediate Division:
  - Champions (1): 1963–64
  - Runners-up (2): 1952–53, 1958–59
- Brighton, Hove & District Football League Junior Division one :
  - Champions (1): 1951–52
  - Runners-up (1): 1949–50

=== Cup honours ===
- Sussex Senior Challenge Cup
  - Runners up (2): 1981–82, 1993–94, winners 2013–14
- The Sussex Royal Ulster Rifles Charity Cup
  - Winners (9): 1977–78, 1981–82, 1992–93, 1994–95, 1995–96, 1996–97, 2009–10, 2018–19, 2022–23
  - Runners up (3): 1980–81, 1989–90, 1990–91
- Sussex County Football League John O'hara League Cup
  - Winners (4): 1991–92, 1992–93, 2009–10, 2012–13
- Sussex County Football League Division Two Cup
  - Winners (4): 1969–70, 1975–76, 2007–08, 2008–09
- Sussex County Football Association Floodlight Cup
  - Winners (2): 1994–95, 1995–96

== Records ==
- Highest League Position: 21st in Isthmian League Premier Division 2014–15
- FA Cup best performance: Fourth qualifying round 1990–91
- FA Trophy best performance: Third qualifying round 2014-15
- FA Vase best performance: Quarter-finals 1995-6, 2022–23

== Former players ==
A list of players that have played for the club at one stage and meet one of the following criteria;

1. Players that have played/managed in the football league or any foreign equivalent to this level (i.e. fully professional league).
2. Players with full international caps.
- (Egypt) Sami El Abd
- (England) Glenn Burvill
- (Montserrat) Sean Howson
- (England) Charlie Walker
- (England) Joe Gatting
- (England) Tommy Fraser
