= Richmond Association F.C. =

Association football club from the Edwardian era

- Full name: Richmond Association Football Club
- Founded: 1898
- Dissolved: 1920
- Ground: Garratt Lane
Home colours

Richmond Association F.C. was an amateur association football club from Richmond-upon-Thames in London, active around the turn of the 19th/20th centuries.

== History ==
The club was formed in June 1898, and ambitiously asked the Duke of Teck and Duke of Cambridge to be club president. It took the formal name of Richmond Association to prevent a dispute with the Richmond rugby club.

Richmond's first FA Cup tie, in the first qualifying round against Queen's Park Rangers in September 1898, ended in a 3–0 win to Richmond, after QPR's Brooks was sent off and the Rangers fans set about the referee. The Football Association suspended QPR, which, as a consequence, turned professional. The same season it entered the FA Amateur Cup for the first time, winning through four qualifying rounds to the first round proper, where it lost at Lowestoft Town.

The debut season was the club's best run in the Amateur Cup, but its best in the FA Cup came in 1900–01, when it reached the fifth and final qualifying round, the equivalent of the second round in 2025, helped by Wycombe Wanderers withdrawing in the third. At the final stage, Richmond lost 2–0 at Southern League professionals Reading.

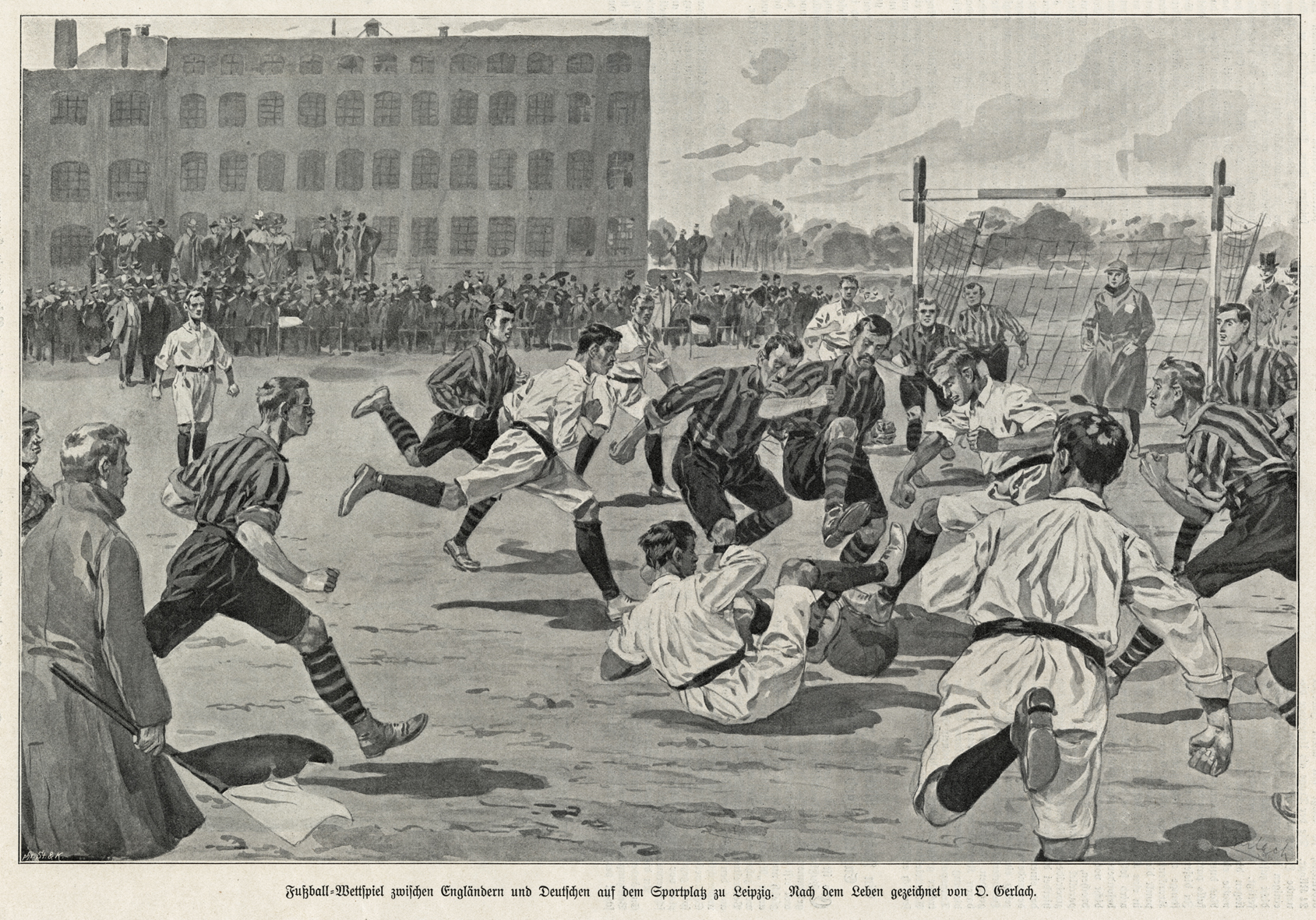
Richmond Association (stripes) playing at VfB Leipzig in 1902

The club's move to north of the Thames in 1900 meant that it was entitled to enter the Middlesex Senior Cup in 1901–02, and it won the tournament, beating Ealing Association in the final at the latter's ground, Willson heading the only goal shortly before half-time. The club repeated its triumph in 1903–04, beating Shepherd's Bush in a replay.

In the early half of the 1900s, the club was a regular attraction on European tours, playing in Berlin, Prague, Vienna, and Budapest, amongst other cities. However one tour of Germany had a sour after-taste as the Football Association investigated the club for not providing proper accounts.

Any chance the club had of progressing in the game was dashed when it was one of the clubs which broke away from the FA to form the Amateur Football Association in the summer of 1907; that precluded it from entering the FA's national competitions. Instead it played in the Southern Amateur Football League, and the AFA Cup, its best season coming in its first, when distant runner-up to New Crusaders.

The club merged with Hampstead F.C. to form the short-lived Hampstead & Richmond F.C., playing at Old Deer Park, in 1920.

== Colours ==
The club adopted violet and black halved shirts with white sleeves, the baroque combination chosen because "a prominent Southern League team...desired to use these colours very much" but T. A. Reakes, the club's assistant secretary, jumped in to register them first. By 1902 the club was wearing the colours in more regular stripes.

== Ground ==
The club's original home was the Old Deer Park in Richmond. It moved to Wood Lane in Shepherd's Bush in August 1900. Before the 1906–07 season, the club moved back south of the Thames, playing at Garratt Lane in Earlsfield.

== Notable players ==
- Wilf Waller, the club's first goalkeeper, who represented the Football Association amateur XI on a tour of Germany in 1899 while a Richmond player
- Herbert Smith, full-back for Richmond in 1899 before moving to Reading
