= Sidley United F.C. =

Association football club in England

Coordinates: 50°51′26.78″N 0°28′25.43″E

Sidley United
- Full name: Sidley United Football Club
- Nickname: "The Blues"
- Founded: 1906
- Ground: Hooe Recreation Ground
- Chairman: Dickie Day
- Manager: Mark Linch
- League: East Sussex League Premier Division
- 2024–25: East Sussex League Premier Division, 8th of 10
Home colours	Away colours

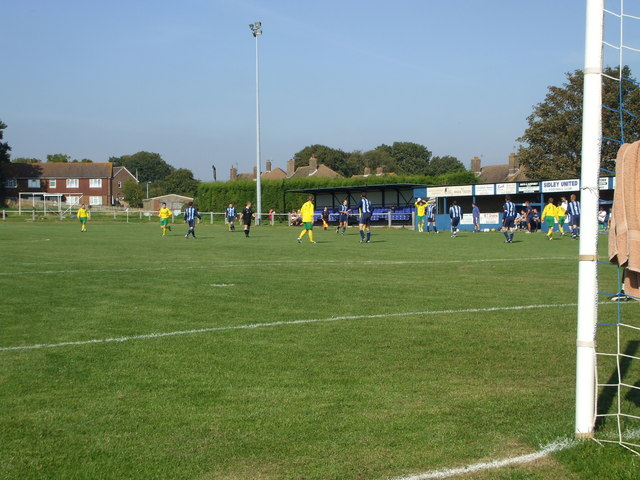
Sidley at home to Sidlesham

Sidley United Football Club is a football club based in Sidley, near Bexhill, England. The club is affiliated to the Sussex County Football Association They currently play in the East Sussex Football League.

== History ==
Sidley United were founded in 1906 and were founder members of Division Two of the Sussex County League in 1952. Which they won in the 1958–59 season. By 1965 the club found themselves back in Division Two, however they won the Division straight away to win promotion back into Division One.

The club alternated between Division One and Two for the next 21 seasons, which saw them twice finish runners up in Division Two in 1971 and 1978. During this period the club also made their debut in the FA Cup in the 1973–74 season. At the end of the 1987–88 season Sidley were relegated into Division Three. It then took the club three seasons to get back up to Division Two when they won promotion into Division Two as runners-up in 1988–89.

In 1996–97 Sidley won the Division Two cup and won the league in 1998–99, winning promotion back into Division One. The 2000–01 season saw Sidley win Division One for the first time in their history, finishing five points ahead of Burgess Hill Town, they also won the John O'Hara League Challenge Cup completing the league and cup double. Seven seasons later at the end of the 2007–08 campaign the club were relegated back to Division Two, when they finished bottom of Division One. The club gained promotion back to Division One at the end of the 2009–10 season, and completed a double by winning the Hastings Senior Cup as well. They remained playing in the league until 2013, achieving mid-table finishes.

The club withdrew from the Sussex County League in 2013 due to the loss of their home ground following the financial collapse of the main social club and went without football that season but resumed playing in the ADA East Sussex Football League for the 2014/15 season in which they finished mid table. On 28 February 2015 their former clubhouse at The Gullivers was burnt down due to a fire.

On 6 April 2016 they won the Sussex FA Junior Cup for the second time in their history by beating Wadhurst United 6 – 4 after extra time. The game had ended 3 – 3 with Sidley three times coming from behind. They clinched the Division One title later that month.

After a couple of top half finishes, the Blues won the ESFL Premier Division in 2018/19. The club moved across into the Mid Sussex Football League for the next 3 seasons, winning the Championship Division in 2019/20 and Premier Division in 2021/22 as well as the Sussex FA Intermediate Cup that season before they returned to the East Sussex Football League.

== Stadium ==
Sidley United used to play their home games at Gullivers Sports Ground, Glovers Lane, North Road, Sidley, East Sussex, TN39 5BL.

Following the collapse of Sidley Social club, Gullivers closed and is no longer available. On 28 February 2015 the clubhouse suffered extensive damage following a fire.

Sidley United now play their home matches at Hooe Recreation Ground, Mill Lane, Hooe, TN33 9HR.

== Honours ==
=== League honours ===
- Sussex County League Division One
  - Champions (1): 2000–01
- Sussex County League Division Two
  - Champions (3): 1958–59, 1964–65, 1998–99
  - Runners-up (2): 1971–72, 1977–78
- Sussex County League Division Three
  - Runners-up (1): 1989–90
- East Sussex Football League Premier Division
  - Champions (1): 2018–19
- East Sussex Football League Division One
  - Champions (1): 2015–16
- Mid Sussex Football League Premier Division
  - Champions (1): 2021–22
- Mid Sussex Football League Championship Division
  - Champions (1): 2019–20

=== Cup honours ===
- The Sussex Royal Ulster Rifles Charity Cup
  - Runners-up (1): 2002–03
- Sussex County League Challenge Cup
  - Winners (1): 2000–01
  - Runners-up (2): 1969–70, 2006–07
- Sussex County League Division Two Cup
  - Winners (2): 1957–58, 1996–97
  - Runners-up (2): 1953–54, 1975–76
- Hastings Senior Cup
  - Winners (2): 2009–10, 2010–11
  - Runners-up (1): 2011–12
- Sussex FA Intermediate Cup
  - Winners (2): 1947–48, 2021–22
- Sussex FA Junior Cup
  - Winners (2): 1924–25, 2015–16

== Records ==
- Highest League Position: 1st in Sussex County League Division One 2000–01
- FA Cup best performance: First Qualifying Round 1974–75, 1975–76, 1976–77, 1977–78, 1978–79
- FA Vase best performance: Third Round 1998–99, 2005–06

== Former players ==
1. Players that have played/managed in the football league or any foreign equivalent to this level (i.e. fully professional league).
2. Players with full international caps.
- (England) Leon Legge
