= Olympic F.C. (London) =

Olympic
- Full name: Olympic Association Football Club
- Founded: 1870
- Dissolved: 1910?
- Ground: Hare & Billet, Blackheath, London
Home colours

Olympic F.C. was an English association football club, originally from Blackheath in London.

== History ==
The club was founded in 1870 as the works side of Hitchcock, Williams & Co, textile manufacturers near St Paul's Cathedral. The earliest record of any match played by the club is in October 1873.

Although the club played a large number of matches throughout the late 1870s (for instance in 1877–78 the club had a record of 10 wins, 3 draws, and 5 defeats), the club did not enter the FA Cup until 1881–82, losing to the Old Harrovians in the first round. Despite the lack of interest in the national competition, the club was a founder member of the London Football Association in 1882.

The club's only other entry to the main rounds of the Cup was the following year, when it lost to the United Hospitals club in the first round. When qualifying rounds were introduced in 1888–89, the club did not put in an entry. It did however enter the qualifying rounds on later occasions, and in 1900–01 was knocked out by West Ham United in the third qualifying round, having had to cede home advantage as its ground was not in a fit state, but only going down 1–0.

As the Olympic remained a works side, it could not compete at the top level of the game in the professional era, and it is unclear when the club disbanded. The club is listed as a London Football Association founder member in 1892 and played in the London Senior Cup until 1905–06. The club's biggest successes came in the City of London Shield, reserved for works sides in the City of London, which the club won every season from 1897–98 to 1903–04.

== Grounds ==
The club originally played in Blackheath, using the Hare & Billett for its facilities. By 1881 it had moved its facilities to the Freemasons' Tavern in Romford Road, Forest Gate, suggesting its regular pitch was in West Ham Park. Its last known ground was at Chapel Farm in Eltham.

== Colours ==
From the Charles Alcock yearbooks
Year	Colours
1878	Black jersey, lemon armlets, white knickers, black stockings, black and lemon cap
1882	Lemon & white
1883	Lemon & black
1884	Lemon & black
1886	Lemon & black
1887	Lemon & black

Its final known colours were black and white stripes.
