= Blackburn Park Road F.C. (1893) =

Former association football club

Blackburn Park Road
- Full name: Blackburn Park Road Football Club
- Nickname: the Roadsters
- Founded: 1893
- Dissolved: 1902
- Ground: Audley End
- Chairman: Thomas Hewitt
Home colours

Blackburn Park Road F.C. was an association football club active around the turn of the 19th and 20th centuries.

== History ==
In 1893, some of the "enthusiasts" of the defunct Blackburn Park Road club, including former Park Road captain H. Jackson, formed a new side using their old club's name, and in 1893–94 won the Blackburn Junior League, Blackburn Rovers Medal Competition, and North-east Lancashire Cup; the last tournament saw a crowd of 3,000 at Audley Grange to see the Roadsters beat Whalley Grange 4–0. The following month the club was paraded through the town on six waggonettes, and Blackburn Rovers signing up five of its players.

Its greatest achievement was to win the Lancashire Junior Cup in 1895–96, thanks to a 3–1 win in the final, over Skerton at Burnden Park. The following season, the club won the first North-east Lancashire Combination, beating Great Harwood to the title by a point, the title being secured by a final day goalless draw at Nelson reserves. It also entered the FA Cup for the first time, but lost in the first qualifying round to Southport Central. It also reached the North-east Lancashire final again, but lost to Trawden Forest.

For 1897–98, the club was elected to the Lancashire Combination, and enjoyed its best Cup run, reaching the fourth (and penultimate) qualifying round, going out 2–1 at Wigan County, before a crowd of 4,000. The club made the Junior Cup Final again in 1899–1900, losing 1–0 to Turton in a replay at Darwen's Anchor Ground.

However the club was struggling for support, the club chairman telling the local media that the club had made a loss of £7 on one Junior Cup tie en route to the 1900 final, and urging for higher attendances. The 1900–01 season though was even more financially crippling. Many of the club's opponents were reserve players of senior clubs, and the Park Road players had generally come straight from millwork, only being paid out of the gate if there was any spare after expenses - with gates sometimes amounting to a mere £1 10/-.

At the end of the season, following four finishes in the lower reaches of the Combination, the Roadsters left the Lancashire Combination to return to the North-East Combination, and won the 1901–02 title, but the competition wound up at the end of the season.

The Roadsters held a medal tournament over the close season, which proved to be a fatal mistake. The Lancashire Football Association had refused permission to host such a tournament in March, and the club was suspended in July pending a satisfactory explanation. The club was unable to provide one, and the suspension was continued "indefinitely", never to be lifted.

== Colours ==
The revived club wore red shirts.

== Ground ==
The club played on the Audley End ground, "once the property of the once famous but now defunct Park Road". In 1901, the club left the ground for a field close to, the annual rent proved crippling.

== Notable players ==
- Jack Sherrington, who left the Roadsters for the Rovers at the end of the 1900–01 season.

== Main honours ==
- Lancashire Junior Cup
  - Winner: 1895–96
  - Runner-up: 1899–1900
- North-east Lancashire Combination
  - Winner 1896–97, 1901–02
