= Brighton & Hove Rangers F.C. =

Football club and predecessor of Brighton & Hove Albion

Brighton & Hove Rangers
- Full name: Brighton & Hove Rangers Football Club
- Founded: 1900
- Dissolved: 1901
- Ground: Home Farm
Home colours

Brighton & Hove Rangers F.C. was an association football club from Brighton, Sussex, which was instrumental in the formation of Brighton & Hove Albion.

== History ==
The club was formed as an amateur club in 1900, after the demise of the professional Brighton United. The club was effectively a revival of the North End Rangers club, which had wound up in April 1900, and from which the new club took its name. Its first game was a goalless draw at Clapton on 1 September.

The Rangers entered two competitions of note in its one season, namely the FA Cup and the Sussex Senior Cup. It won through to the third qualifying round of the former, where it lost 5–1 at home to Chatham, conceding three unanswered second-half goals. It went all the way to the final of the latter (beating Hove F.C. in the semi-final), played at the County Cricket Ground, Hove, but lost 3–1 to Eastbourne.

At the end of the 1900–01 season, the club was accepted into the Southern League second division. It did not however take up the place; the club was effectively replaced in June 1901, when a "new venture" (a semi-professional club) was formed at the Seven Stars Inn. The new club was originally called Brighton & Hove United, but, after objections from Hove F.C., by the time the season started the club was called Brighton & Hove Albion. The Albion took over the Southern League place and the Rangers were not heard of again.

== Colours ==
The club wore black and white striped shirts, white shorts, and black socks.

== Ground ==
The club played at Surrenden Field at Home Farm in Withdean.
