= Crowborough Athletic F.C. =

Association football club in England

Coordinates: 51°2′31″N 0°9′56″E

Crowborough Athletic
- Full name: Crowborough Athletic Football Club
- Nickname: The Crows
- Founded: 1894
- Ground: Crowborough Community Stadium, Crowborough
- Capacity: 2,000 (150 seated)
- Chairman: Phil Tibbutt
- Manager: Sean Muggeridge
- League: Isthmian League South East Division
- 2025–26: Isthmian League South East Division, 14th of 22
- Website: crowboroughathletic.com
Home colours	Away colours

Crowborough Athletic Football Club is a football club based in Crowborough, East Sussex, England. Affiliated to the Sussex County Football Association, the club are currently members of the Isthmian League South East Division and play at the Crowborough Community Stadium.

== History ==
The club was established in 1894 and initially played in leagues in the Tunbridge Wells area. In 1974 they joined Division Two of the Sussex County League. In 1977–78 the club won the Division Two Cup. They remained in Division Two until being relegated to Division Three at the end of the 1983–84 season. After finishing as Division Three runners-up in 1986–87, the club were promoted back to Division Two. In 1992–93 they won Division Two, beating title rivals Stamco 3–2 on the final day of the season with Stamco having only needed a draw to win the title, and were promoted to Division One. They remained in Division One until finishing bottom of the division in 1995–96, at which point they were relegated to Division Two.

In 1998–99 Crowborough were relegated to Division Three. Although they were promoted back to Division Two in 1999–2000 having finished only fourth, they were relegated to Division Three again the following season. In 2001–02 they won the Division Three Cup, and in 2003–04 the club were Division Three champions, and after winning Division Two the following season, they returned to Division One. The 2006–07 season saw them win the League Cup. In 2007–08 they won Division One and were promoted to Division One South of the Isthmian League. However, after the majority of the team left following the withdrawal of financial support from a major benefactor, the club finished bottom of the division in their first season in the league and were relegated back to the Sussex County League. In 2014 the club were transferred to the Southern Counties East League, and became members of the Premier Division in 2016 when the league gained a second division.

In 2022 Crowborough were transferred to the Premier Division of the Southern Combination. In 2023–24 the club finished third in the Premier Division, qualifying for the promotion play-offs. They went on to lose 5–4 on penalties to Newhaven in the semi-finals. The club were runners-up in the Premier Division the following season. In the subsequent play-offs, they beat Petersfield Town 2–0 in the semi-finals and then defeated Eastbourne United 2–1 in the final to earn promotion to the South East Division of the Isthmian League. Four days after the play-off final the two teams met in the Sussex RUR Cup final, with Crowborough winning 3–1.

== Ground ==
The club has played at the Alderbrook Recreation Ground since the early 1950s. Redevelopment saw a new stadium created in the recreation ground, named the Crowborough Community Stadium. The ground currently has a capacity of 2,000, of which 150 is seated.

== Honours ==
- Sussex County League
  - Champions 2007–08
  - Division Two champions 1992–93, 2004–05
  - Division Three champions 2003–04
  - John O'Hara League Challenge Cup winners 2006–07
  - Division Three Cup winners 2001–02, 2003–04
- RUR Cup
  - Winners 2024–25
- Mid-Sussex Senior Charity Cup
  - Winners 1951–52, 1953–54

== Records ==
- Best FA Cup performance: Third qualifying round, 2008–09, 2026–27
- Best FA Trophy performance: Second qualifying round, 2025–26
- Best FA Vase performance: Fifth round, 2007–08

== See also ==
- Crowborough Athletic F.C. players
