= Rye United F.C. =

Association football club in England

Rye United
- Full name: Rye United Football Club
- Nickname: The Quarterboys
- Founded: 1938
- Dissolved: 2014
- Ground: The Salts, Rye
- 2013–14: Sussex County League; Division One, 19th (withdrew)
Home colours	Away colours

Rye United Football Club was a football club based in Rye, East Sussex, England. They were the founding members of the Sussex County League Division Two in 1952. The club were members of Division One of the league, but withdrew from league football in 2014. From 2016 the Rye Town club plays at the same ground.

== History ==
=== Rye United F.C. ===
Rye United was formed in 1938 as an amalgamation of Rye FC and Rye Old Boys, playing in the East Sussex League until joining the Sussex County League Division Two in 1952. In the 1955–56 season they won the championship and also promotion to Division One. Rye United moved to the Kent County League for the 1983–84 season. For the 2000–01 season, United returned to the Sussex County League entering Division Three. They won the league that season before amalgamating with Iden.

=== Iden F.C. ===
Iden had been formed in 1965 for the youth of the village. The club steadily progressed through the ranks of junior football & competed in the East Sussex League and Kent County League at intermediate level.

=== Rye and Iden United F.C. ===
After the two clubs amalgamated in 2001, the club won Division Two championship and divisional cup double. Due to a lack of floodlighting at their ground, however, they had to play another season in Division Two. The club also reached the semi-final of the Sussex Senior Challenge Cup, losing after extra time to Conference giants Crawley Town. However, the next season they won the cup and league double again and won promotion to Division One. The club then finished runners up under the management of Ryan Light (equaling their best league performance). In 2004–05, the club had the most successful season in its history under Glynn White, finishing as league runners up and also winning the John O'Hara League Cup and Hastings Senior Cup.

=== Back to Rye United F.C. ===
Following the 2005–06 season, the club reverted its original name. A new Iden club has been formed and Rye, magnanimously, did not object to the use of the Iden name. Newly appointed manager Mike Robbins was replaced by experienced County League Manager Dave Shearing who took over the helm mid-season. Despite finishing the Season in 19th position Rye were spared the drop by events outside of the Division and remained in the top flight for the 2007–08 season, where they repeated their 19th-place finish and this time were, rightfully, relegated to Division Two. Promotion back to the top flight of Sussex Football came under Scott Price in 2009–10 and was followed by a rollercoaster season (2010–11)that saw tragedy off the pitch with the loss of clubhouse in an arson attack but a record breaking run in the FA Carlsberg Vase that saw Rye reach the quarter-finals and also saw the club finish runners up in both the League and League Cup. The new clubhouse is due to open in early 2012. To raise funds for the rebuilding, the club's supporters released two singles on iTunes. In 2011–12 season, Rye United won the Sussex RUR Cup for the first time in 44 years.

=== Withdrawal from the League ===
On 20 March 2014, the club held an Extraordinary General Meeting at which it was decided to withdraw from the league with immediate effect.

== Colours and crest ==
Rye United played in red and black and used a blue and black kit as an away kit. The club used the town's coat of arms as its crest, which dates back to Confederation of the Cinque Ports and is believed to date from the 13th century. The crest is very similar to the crest of Hastings United, who also use their towns coat of arms, however there is a slight variation between the two.

== Ground ==
Rye United played their home games at the Salts, Fishmarket Road in Rye.

The club's home ground is also used by the local cricket club. Because of the ground share with the cricket club, the club had to remove the floodlights during the summer months and then erect them again after the cricket season was over. The club was also forced to erect a temporary fence on matchdays to discourage unpaid entry to the ground. In August 2010 the pavilion which housed the clubhouse and changing rooms was destroyed after a fire. The new clubhouse was completed in March 2012.

== Records ==
- Best FA Cup performance: Preliminary round (2012–13, 2013–14)
- Best FA Vase performance: Quarter-finals (2010–11)

== Honours and achievements ==
- Sussex County League
  - FA Vase Quarter Finalists: 2010–11
  - Sussex County League Division 1 Runners Up (4): 1959–60, 2003–04, 2004–05, 2010–11
  - Sussex County League Division 2 Winners (4): 1955–56, 2001–02, 2002–03, 2009–10
  - Sussex County League Division 3 Winners (1): 2000–01
  - League Challenge Cup Winners (1): 2004–05
  - Division Two Challenge Cup Winners (2): 2001–02, 2002–03
- The Sussex Royal Ulster Rifles Charity Cup
  - Winners (2): 1967–68, 2011–12
  - Runners-up (2): 1965–66, 1969–70

== Rye Town ==
In the 2016/17 season adult football returned to Rye, with the formation of Rye Town who began playing in the East Sussex Football League. The newly formed team had its home at the Salts, the same ground as used by Rye United.
