= 1977–78 Sussex County Football League =

The 1977–78 Sussex County Football League season was the 53rd in the history of Sussex County Football League a football competition in England.

== Division One ==
Sussex County Football League Division One
- Season: 1977–78
- Champions: Shoreham
- Relegated: Selsey; Wigmore Athletic
- Matches played: 240
- Goals scored: 774 (3.23 per match)

Division One featured 14 clubs which competed in the division last season, along with two new clubs, promoted from Division Two:

- Arundel
- Shoreham

=== League table ===
Pos	Team	Pld	W	D	L	GF	GA	GR	Pts	Qualification or relegation
1	Shoreham	30	21	5	4	77	25	3.080	47	
2	Peacehaven & Telscombe	30	21	4	5	59	26	2.269	46	
3	Horsham YMCA	30	17	8	5	55	32	1.719	42	
4	Burgess Hill Town	30	15	10	5	58	28	2.071	40	
5	Southwick	30	17	6	7	64	40	1.600	40	
6	Bexhill Town	30	16	5	9	63	37	1.703	37	
7	Littlehampton Town	30	15	7	8	57	37	1.541	37	
8	Eastbourne Town	30	13	5	12	56	44	1.273	31	
9	Arundel	30	10	9	11	40	41	0.976	29	
10	Rye United	30	10	6	14	46	53	0.868	26	
11	Chichester City	30	9	7	14	41	58	0.707	25	
12	East Grinstead	30	8	7	15	40	50	0.800	23	
13	Haywards Heath	30	8	6	16	38	45	0.844	22	
14	Ringmer	30	6	9	15	39	47	0.830	21	
15	Selsey	30	3	3	24	19	95	0.200	9	Relegated to Division Two
16	Wigmore Athletic	30	2	1	27	22	116	0.190	5	Relegated to Division Two

Source: nonleaguematters
Rules for classification: 1) points; 2) goal ratio.

== Division Two ==
Sussex County Football League Division Two
- Season: 1977–78
- Champions: Steyning
- Promoted: Steyning; Sidley United
- Matches played: 210
- Goals scored: 697 (3.32 per match)

Division Two featured twelve clubs which competed in the division last season, along with three new clubs:

- Albion United, joined from the East Sussex League
- Three Bridges, relegated from Division One
- Whitehawk, relegated from Division One

=== League table ===
Pos	Team	Pld	W	D	L	GF	GA	GR	Pts	Qualification or relegation
1	Steyning	28	20	5	3	84	21	4.000	45	Promoted to Division One
2	Sidley United	28	18	4	6	69	40	1.725	40	Promoted to Division One
3	Pagham	28	16	6	6	66	27	2.444	38	
4	Three Bridges	28	16	4	8	50	30	1.667	36	
5	Albion United	28	14	5	9	47	36	1.306	33	
6	Hastings Town	28	14	5	9	53	43	1.233	33	
7	Portfield	28	13	6	9	46	43	1.070	32	
8	Hailsham Town	28	11	6	11	47	52	0.904	28	
9	Storrington	28	11	5	12	51	52	0.981	27	
10	Whitehawk	28	11	4	13	42	53	0.792	26	
11	Lancing	28	9	6	13	35	37	0.946	24	
12	Crowborough Athletic	28	7	8	13	33	39	0.846	22	
13	Wick	28	8	5	15	33	40	0.825	21	
14	Seaford Town	28	4	2	22	22	81	0.272	10	Resigned from the league
15	Newhaven	28	2	1	25	19	103	0.184	5	

Source: nonleaguematters
Rules for classification: 1) points; 2) goal ratio.
