= 1978–79 Sussex County Football League =

The 1978–79 Sussex County Football League season was the 54th in the history of Sussex County Football League a football competition in England.

== Division One ==
Sussex County Football League Division One
- Season: 1978–79
- Champions: Peacehaven & Telscombe
- Relegated: East Grinstead; Sidley United
- Matches played: 240
- Goals scored: 742 (3.09 per match)

Division One featured 14 clubs which competed in the division last season, along with two new clubs, promoted from Division Two:

- Sidley United
- Steyning

=== League table ===
Pos	Team	Pld	W	D	L	GF	GA	GR	Pts	Qualification or relegation
1	Peacehaven & Telscombe	30	18	9	3	61	28	2.179	45	
2	Southwick	30	16	9	5	60	33	1.818	41	
3	Horsham YMCA	30	18	5	7	58	33	1.758	41	
4	Steyning	30	15	7	8	56	45	1.244	37	
5	Littlehampton Town	30	14	7	9	54	34	1.588	35	
6	Ringmer	30	13	8	9	41	44	0.932	34	
7	Arundel	30	13	7	10	44	37	1.189	33	
8	Shoreham	30	10	10	10	43	40	1.075	30	
9	Haywards Heath	30	9	12	9	44	47	0.936	30	
10	Bexhill Town	30	11	5	14	56	56	1.000	27	
11	Eastbourne Town	30	10	6	14	47	51	0.922	26	
12	Chichester City	30	10	5	15	51	64	0.797	25	
13	Burgess Hill Town	30	8	6	16	34	56	0.607	22	
14	Rye United	30	8	5	17	31	42	0.738	21	
15	East Grinstead	30	5	8	17	40	65	0.615	18	Relegated to Division Two
16	Sidley United	30	5	5	20	22	67	0.328	15	Relegated to Division Two

Source: nonleaguematters
Rules for classification: 1) points; 2) goal ratio.

== Division Two ==
Sussex County Football League Division Two
- Season: 1978–79
- Champions: Pagham
- Promoted: Pagham; Portfield
- Matches played: 182
- Goals scored: 542 (2.98 per match)

Division Two featured twelve clubs which competed in the division last season, along with two new clubs relegated from Division One:

- Selsey
- Wigmore Athletic

=== League table ===
Pos	Team	Pld	W	D	L	GF	GA	GR	Pts	Qualification or relegation
1	Pagham	26	20	4	2	58	16	3.625	44	Promoted to Division One
2	Portfield	26	16	6	4	43	22	1.955	38	Promoted to Division One
3	Three Bridges	26	14	6	6	52	30	1.733	34	
4	Hastings Town	26	15	3	8	43	33	1.303	33	
5	Hailsham Town	26	14	3	9	47	42	1.119	31	
6	Wick	26	10	7	9	33	29	1.138	27	
7	Storrington	26	8	9	9	42	36	1.167	25	
8	Newhaven	26	9	7	10	32	36	0.889	25	
9	Albion United	26	8	8	10	43	40	1.075	24	
10	Lancing	26	8	7	11	37	36	1.028	23	
11	Crowborough Athletic	26	6	6	14	28	49	0.571	18	
12	Wigmore Athletic	26	6	4	16	36	53	0.679	16	
13	Whitehawk	26	6	4	16	24	50	0.480	16	
14	Selsey	26	2	6	18	24	70	0.343	10	

Source: nonleaguematters
Rules for classification: 1) points; 2) goal ratio.
