= 2020–21 Isthmian League =

The 2020–21 season was the 106th season of the Isthmian League, which is an English football competition featuring semi-professional and amateur clubs from London, East and South East England. The league operates four divisions, the Premier Division at Step 3, and three divisions, North, South Central and South East at Step 4 of the National League System. This was the third season since the former South Division was subdivided into the South Central and South East divisions. The league is also known as the Pitching In League under a sponsorship deal with Entain, formerly GVC Holdings.

The allocations for Steps 3 and 4 for season 2020–21 were announced by the FA on 21 July 2020.

Due to the restrictions on clubs' ability to play matches in the lockdowns associated with an ongoing spike in UK deaths from the COVID-19 pandemic, competitions at Steps 3–6 were curtailed on 24 February 2021. The scheduled restructuring of non-league took place at the end of the season, with a new division added to Northern Premier League at Step 4 for 2021–22, which resulted in some reallocations into or out of, and promotions to, the Isthmian League's Step 4 divisions.

== Premier Division ==
The Premier Division comprised the same set of 22 teams which competed in the aborted competition the previous season.

=== League table ===
Isthmian League Premier Division
- Season: 2020–21

Pos	Team	Pld	W	D	L	GF	GA	GD	Pts
1	Worthing	8	7	0	1	22	10	+12	21
2	Cheshunt	11	6	2	3	13	14	−1	20
3	Enfield Town	10	6	0	4	15	17	−2	18
4	Carshalton Athletic	8	5	1	2	14	10	+4	16
5	Cray Wanderers	7	5	0	2	21	10	+11	15
6	Kingstonian	9	5	0	4	15	18	−3	15
7	Bishop's Stortford	6	4	2	0	13	5	+8	14
8	Hornchurch	10	4	2	4	17	12	+5	14
9	Horsham	10	4	2	4	19	15	+4	14
10	Folkestone Invicta	9	4	1	4	13	13	0	13
11	Haringey Borough	8	4	0	4	13	13	0	12
12	Leatherhead	9	3	3	3	8	15	−7	12
13	Bowers & Pitsea	5	3	1	1	13	5	+8	10
14	Bognor Regis Town	7	4	1	2	12	6	+6	10 (Note: Bognor deducted three points for fielding an ineligible player on 17 October 2020.)
15	Potters Bar Town	9	3	1	5	13	11	+2	10
16	Wingate & Finchley	8	3	1	4	18	17	+1	10
17	Corinthian-Casuals	9	3	1	5	9	13	−4	10
18	Lewes	8	2	2	4	8	15	−7	8
19	Brightlingsea Regent	11	2	2	7	11	20	−9	8
20	Margate	9	1	3	5	6	13	−7	6
21	East Thurrock United	9	1	2	6	10	21	−11	5
22	Merstham	8	1	1	6	8	18	−10	4

Source: Isthmian League
Rules for classification: 1) points; 2) goal difference; 3) number of goals scored; 4) number of matches won; 5) head-to-head results

=== Results table ===
Home \ Away	HOR	BIS	BOG	B&P	BRI	CAR	CHE	COR	CRA	ETU	ENF	FOL	HAR	HRM	KIN	LEA	LEW	MAR	MER	POT	W&F	WOR
Hornchurch						4–0							3–1	1–1					2–1		2–3	
Bishop's Stortford	1–0		2–2				2–0				4–1	1–1										
Bognor Regis Town						2–1				4–0								2–0				
Bowers & Pitsea					2–1											7–0	1–1					
Brightlingsea Regent										1–1		1–2	0–3			3–0		1–2				
Carshalton Athletic								1–0			2–0			3–1						3–0		
Cheshunt	0–3		1–0							1–0		2–1			3–2							
Corinthian-Casuals					2–0						2–0		1–2			0–0						
Cray Wanderers		1–3													5–1				6–0			
East Thurrock United						1–2			1–3					3–2					2–2			1–3
Enfield Town					3–2										2–1	1–0	4–1	1–0				
Folkestone Invicta	2–1								1–3											1–0	4–1	1–2
Haringey Borough			2–1						1–3	3–1						0–1						
Horsham			0–1		4–0		1–2	2–1			5–2											
Kingstonian	2–0												3–1							1–0	3–2	0–4
Leatherhead												2–0		1–1				0–0				4–3
Lewes					1–2													1–0	1–0			1–3
Margate	1–1					2–2	0–2															1–3
Merstham								3–0			0–1				1–2					1–4		
Potters Bar Town							3–0	1–2	3–0							1–1						1–2
Wingate & Finchley				1–2			2–2	4–1						1–2			4–1					
Worthing				2–1																		

Source: Football Web Pages
Legend: Blue = home team win; Yellow = draw; Red = away team win.

=== Stadia and locations ===
Locations of the Premier Division clubs
Greater London Premier Division football clubs

Club	Location	Stadium	Capacity
Bishop's Stortford	Bishop's Stortford	Woodside Park	4,525
Bognor Regis Town	Bognor Regis	Nyewood Lane	4,500
Bowers & Pitsea	Pitsea	Len Salmon Stadium	2,000
Brightlingsea Regent	Brightlingsea	North Road	2,000
Carshalton Athletic	Carshalton	War Memorial Sports Ground	5,000
Cheshunt	Cheshunt	Theobalds Lane	3,000
Corinthian-Casuals	Tolworth	King George's Field	2,700
Cray Wanderers	St Mary Cray	Hayes Lane (groundshare with Bromley)	6,000
East Thurrock United	Corringham	Rookery Hill	4,000
Enfield Town	Enfield	Queen Elizabeth II Stadium	2,500
Folkestone Invicta	Folkestone	Cheriton Road	4,000
Haringey Borough	Tottenham	Coles Park	2,500
Hornchurch	Hornchurch	Hornchurch Stadium	3,500
Horsham	Horsham	The Camping World Community Stadium	1,300
Kingstonian	Kingston upon Thames	King George's Field (groundshare with Corinthian-Casuals)	2,700
Leatherhead	Leatherhead	Fetcham Grove	3,400
Lewes	Lewes	The Dripping Pan	3,000
Margate	Margate	Hartsdown Park	3,000
Merstham	Merstham	Moatside	2,000
Potters Bar Town	Potters Bar	Parkfield	2,000
Wingate & Finchley	Finchley	The Maurice Rebak Stadium	1,500
Worthing	Worthing	Woodside Road	4,000

== North Division ==
The North Division comprised the same set of 20 teams which competed in the aborted competition the previous season.

=== League table ===
Isthmian League North Division
- Season: 2020–21

Pos	Team	Pld	W	D	L	GF	GA	GD	Pts	Qualification
1	Tilbury	8	5	1	2	14	9	+5	16	
2	AFC Sudbury	8	3	3	2	15	14	+1	12	
3	Maldon & Tiptree	5	3	2	0	9	3	+6	11	
4	Bury Town	4	3	1	0	9	2	+7	10	
5	Heybridge Swifts	8	3	1	4	10	9	+1	10	
6	Histon	6	3	1	2	10	9	+1	10	Transferred to Northern Premier League Division One Midlands
7	Soham Town Rangers	7	3	1	3	7	7	0	10	Transferred to Northern Premier League Division One Midlands
8	Grays Athletic	6	3	1	2	5	6	−1	10	
9	Aveley	6	3	0	3	8	9	−1	9	
10	Romford	8	2	3	3	7	10	−3	9	
11	Coggeshall Town	6	2	2	2	7	6	+1	8	
12	Dereham Town	7	2	2	3	7	7	0	8	
13	Felixstowe & Walton United	5	2	2	1	7	7	0	8	
14	Great Wakering Rovers	7	2	2	3	11	14	−3	8	
15	Canvey Island	5	1	3	1	8	5	+3	6	
16	Hullbridge Sports	5	2	0	3	11	9	+2	6	
17	Cambridge City	4	2	0	2	3	3	0	6	Transferred to Northern Premier League Division One Midlands
18	Brentwood Town	5	1	3	1	5	6	−1	6	
19	Basildon United	6	1	2	3	11	9	+2	5	
20	Witham Town	8	1	0	7	7	27	−20	3	

Source: Isthmian League web site
Rules for classification: 1) points; 2) goal difference; 3) number of goals scored; 4) number of matches won; 5) head-to-head results

=== Results table ===
Home \ Away	SUD	AVE	BAS	BRE	BUR	CAM	CAN	COG	DER	FEL	GRA	GWR	HEY	HIS	HUL	M&T	ROM	STR	TIL	WIT
AFC Sudbury				2–2				2–1					1–1		0–3					5–2
Aveley				0–1					3–2										0–3	4–2
Basildon United	2–2				0–1		3–3					6–0								
Brentwood Town							1–1				0–2									
Bury Town									1–0								2–2			5–0
Cambridge City																		2–1	0–1	
Canvey Island																0–1	0–0			
Coggeshall Town		1–0				0–1							2–0							
Dereham Town						1–0		1–1						0–0						
Felixstowe & Walton United	3–2							2–2							2–0					
Grays Athletic							0–4					1–0					1–1			
Great Wakering Rovers			0–6							0–0				3–4			3–0			
Heybridge Swifts			2–0						0–3					1–2	5–0					
Histon																	1–2	1–2		
Hullbridge Sports																			1–2	
Maldon & Tiptree				1–1						3–0									3–1	
Romford		0–1	1–0																	1–2
Soham Town Rangers	0–1										1–0		1–0			1–1				
Tilbury									2–0		0–1	3–3						2–1		
Witham Town												0–2	0–1	1–2	0–7					

Source: Isthmian League
Legend: Blue = home team win; Yellow = draw; Red = away team win.

=== Stadia and locations ===
Locations of North Division clubs

Club	Location	Stadium	Capacity
AFC Sudbury	Sudbury	King's Marsh	2,500
Aveley	Aveley	Parkside	3,500
Basildon United	Basildon	Gardiners Close	2,000
Brentwood Town	Brentwood	The Brentwood Centre Arena	1,800
Bury Town	Bury St Edmunds	Ram Meadow	3,500
Cambridge City	Cambridge	Bridge Road (groundshare with Histon)	2,000
Canvey Island	Canvey Island	Park Lane	4,500
Coggeshall Town	Coggeshall	West Street	2,000
Dereham Town	Dereham	Aldiss Park	3,000
Felixstowe & Walton United	Felixstowe	Dellwood Avenue	2,000
Grays Athletic	Grays	Parkside (groundshare with Aveley)	3,500
Great Wakering Rovers	Great Wakering	Burroughs Park	2,500
Heybridge Swifts	Heybridge	Scraley Road	3,000
Histon	Impington	Bridge Road	4,300
Hullbridge Sports	Hullbridge	Lower Road	1,500
Maldon & Tiptree	Maldon	Wallace Binder Ground	2,000
Romford	Romford	Mayesbrook Park (groundshare with Barking)	2,500
Soham Town Rangers	Soham	Julius Martin Lane	2,000
Tilbury	Tilbury	Chadfields	4,000
Witham Town	Witham	Spa Road	2,500

== South Central Division ==
The South Central Division comprised the same set of 20 teams which competed in the aborted competition the previous season.

=== League table ===
Isthmian League South Central Division
- Season: 2020–21

Pos	Team	Pld	W	D	L	GF	GA	GD	Pts	Qualification
1	Waltham Abbey	8	5	1	2	13	9	+4	16	Transferred to Southern League Division One Central
2	Staines Town	8	5	1	2	17	17	0	16	
3	Ware	7	5	0	2	20	10	+10	15	Transferred to Southern League Division One Central
4	Tooting & Mitcham United	7	5	0	2	12	3	+9	15	
5	Bracknell Town	5	4	1	0	14	5	+9	13	
6	Chertsey Town	7	4	1	2	14	9	+5	13	
7	Hanwell Town	8	4	1	3	15	12	+3	13	
8	Ashford Town	8	4	1	3	8	8	0	13	
9	Hertford Town	7	4	0	3	10	10	0	12	Transferred to Southern League Division One Central
10	Marlow	7	3	2	2	16	8	+8	11	
11	Westfield	7	3	1	3	15	11	+4	10	
12	Barking	7	3	1	3	9	9	0	10	Transferred to North Division
13	Chipstead	8	3	1	4	12	19	−7	10	
14	Bedfont Sports	6	3	0	3	10	8	+2	9	
15	Chalfont St Peter	8	3	0	5	6	10	−4	9	
16	FC Romania	7	2	0	5	8	14	−6	6	Transferred to Southern League Division One Central
17	Uxbridge	6	1	2	3	5	11	−6	5	
18	South Park	7	1	2	4	12	20	−8	5	
19	Northwood	8	1	1	6	7	19	−12	4	
20	Harlow Town	8	1	0	7	6	17	−11	3	Transferred to Southern League Division One Central

Source: Isthmian League Website
Rules for classification: 1) points; 2) goal difference; 3) number of goals scored; 4) number of matches won; 5) head-to-head results

=== Results table ===
Home \ Away	ASH	BAR	BED	BRA	CHA	CHE	CHI	HAN	HAR	HER	MAR	NOR	ROM	SOU	STA	TOO	UXB	WAL	WAR	WES
Ashford Town						0–3								3–1		0–2				
Barking	1–0										2–2		1–2					3–0		
Bedfont Sports					2–1						1–0								2–3	
Bracknell Town					4–0		2–0													
Chalfont St Peter	0–1	2–0						1–0											0–1	
Chertsey Town				1–2						4–1	0–3						1–0			
Chipstead			0–5					1–3						3–1						1–4
Hanwell Town			1–0									1–1	2–3		2–4					
Harlow Town	1–2				0–1		2–3	0–3					2–0							
Hertford Town					2–1				1–0									1–2		
Marlow															3–0		4–0			3–3
Northwood	0–2					1–3							1–0		1–2					
FC Romania				2–4												0–1				
South Park						2–2						3–2							1–4	
Staines Town										1–0			3–1	4–4		0–4			3–2	
Tooting & Mitcham United			3–0						1–0	1–2								0–1		
Uxbridge	0–0			2–2			1–3													
Waltham Abbey							1–1				2–1	5–1		2–0						0–2
Ware		3–1							6–1								1–2			
Westfield		0–1						2–3		1–3		3–0								

Source: Isthmian League
Legend: Blue = home team win; Yellow = draw; Red = away team win.

=== Stadia and locations ===
Locations of South Central Division clubs
Greater London South Central Division clubs

Club	Location	Stadium	Capacity
Ashford Town	Ashford, Surrey	Robert Parker Stadium	2,550
Barking	Barking	Mayesbrook Park	2,500
Bedfont Sports	Bedfont	Bedfont Recreation Ground	3,000
Bracknell Town	Bracknell	Larges Lane	2,500
Chalfont St Peter	Chalfont St Peter	Mill Meadow	1,500
Chertsey Town	Chertsey	Alwyns Lane	2,500
Chipstead	Chipstead	High Road	2,000
FC Romania	Cheshunt	Cheshunt Stadium (groundshare with Cheshunt)	3,000
Hanwell Town	Perivale	Reynolds Field	3,000
Harlow Town	Harlow	The Harlow Arena	3,500
Hertford Town	Hertford	Hertingfordbury Park	6,500
Marlow	Marlow	Alfred Davis Memorial Ground	3,000
Northwood	Northwood	Northwood Park	3,075
South Park	Reigate	King George's Field	2,000
Staines Town	Staines-upon-Thames	Wheatsheaf Park	3,000
Tooting & Mitcham United	Mitcham	Imperial Fields	3,500
Uxbridge	West Drayton	Honeycroft	3,770
Waltham Abbey	Waltham Abbey	Capershotts	3,500
Ware	Ware	Wodson Park	3,300
Westfield	Woking (Westfield)	Woking Park	1,000

== South East Division ==
The South East Division comprised 19 of the 20 teams which competed in the aborted competition the previous season. Guernsey withdrew from this season due to travel restrictions.

=== League table ===
Isthmian League South East Division
- Season: 2020–21

Pos	Team	Pld	W	D	L	GF	GA	GD	Pts	Qualification
1	Hastings United	7	5	2	0	13	3	+10	17	
2	VCD Athletic	8	5	1	2	18	7	+11	16	
3	East Grinstead Town	6	4	2	0	16	6	+10	14	
4	Whyteleafe	6	4	1	1	15	7	+8	13	Transferred to South Central Division
5	Sevenoaks Town	8	3	4	1	14	10	+4	13	
6	Faversham Town	6	3	3	0	8	3	+5	12	
7	Whitstable Town	9	3	2	4	12	20	−8	11	
8	Hythe Town	6	3	1	2	14	12	+2	10	
9	Ramsgate	6	2	1	3	10	10	0	7	
10	Herne Bay	6	2	1	3	9	9	0	7	
11	Ashford United	6	2	1	3	9	11	−2	7	
12	Cray Valley Paper Mills	5	1	3	1	6	6	0	6	
13	Three Bridges	6	2	0	4	11	15	−4	6	
14	Chichester City	5	2	0	3	7	11	−4	6	
15	Phoenix Sports	7	2	0	5	7	16	−9	6	
16	Whitehawk	6	1	2	3	7	9	−2	5	
17	Haywards Heath Town	7	1	2	4	11	19	−8	5	
18	Sittingbourne	5	1	1	3	8	12	−4	4	
19	Burgess Hill Town	7	1	1	5	5	14	−9	4	

Source: Isthmian League website
Rules for classification: 1) points; 2) goal difference; 3) number of goals scored; 4) number of matches won; 5) head-to-head results

=== Results table ===
Home \ Away	ASH	BUR	CHI	CRA	EAS	FAV	HAS	HAY	HER	HYT	PHO	RAM	SEV	SIT	THR	VCD	WHI	WHT	WHY
Ashford United					0–3						1–2		2–3						2–0
Burgess Hill Town								1–1			2–0	0–3							
Chichester City								3–2				1–3							
Cray Valley Paper Mills						1–2								2–1					
East Grinstead Town												4–1					2–2		
Faversham Town							0–0						1–1			1–0			
Hastings United				0–0											3–0	2–1	2–1		
Haywards Heath Town					1–4		1–5			4–2			2–2					0–2	
Herne Bay			1–2														3–1		1–4
Hythe Town		3–2							1–0		0–4								
Phoenix Sports					1–2				0–3								0–2		
Ramsgate	1–2								1–1						1–2				
Sevenoaks Town		1–0					0–1			2–2					4–1				
Sittingbourne	2–2					0–3												3–2	2–3
Three Bridges											6–0					0–4		2–3	
VCD Athletic			4–1		1–1												2–1	2–0	
Whitehawk						1–1							1–1						
Whitstable Town		1–0		1–1						0–6						1–4			
Whyteleafe		5–0	1–0	2–2															

Source: South East Division grid
Legend: Blue = home team win; Yellow = draw; Red = away team win.

=== Stadia and locations ===
Locations of South East Division clubs
Greater London Premier Division football clubs
Greater London Premier Division football clubs

Club	Location	Stadium	Capacity
Ashford United	Ashford, Kent	The Homelands	3,200
Burgess Hill Town	Burgess Hill	Leylands Park	2,500
Chichester City	Chichester	Oaklands Park	2,000
Cray Valley Paper Mills	Eltham	Badgers Sports Ground	1,000
East Grinstead Town	East Grinstead	East Court	1,500
Faversham Town	Faversham	Salters Lane	2,000
Hastings United	Hastings	The Pilot Field	4,050
Haywards Heath Town	Haywards Heath	Hanbury Park	2,000
Herne Bay	Herne Bay	Winch's Field	4,000
Hythe Town	Hythe	Reachfields Stadium	3,000
Phoenix Sports	Barnehurst	Victory Road	2,000
Ramsgate	Ramsgate	Southwood Stadium	2,500
Sevenoaks Town	Sevenoaks	Greatness Park	1,000
Sittingbourne	Sittingbourne	Woodstock Park	3,000
Three Bridges	Crawley (Three Bridges)	Jubilee Field	1,500
VCD Athletic	Crayford	Oakwood	1,400
Whitehawk	Brighton (Whitehawk)	The Enclosed Ground	3,126
Whitstable Town	Whitstable	The Belmont Ground	3,000
Whyteleafe	Whyteleafe	Church Road	2,000

== League Cup ==
2020–21 Alan Turvey Trophy
Tournament details
- Country: England
- Teams: 79

The 2020–21 Velocity Trophy (formerly the Isthmian League Cup) was to be the 47th season of the Alan Turvey Trophy, the cup competition of the whole Isthmian League. It would have been the second season since the group stage was introduced. The cup was not held.

== See also ==
- Isthmian League
- 2020–21 Northern Premier League
- 2020–21 Southern Football League
