= 2019–20 FA Trophy =

Football Association Trophy

Tournament details
- Country: England; Guernsey; Wales
- Dates: Qualifying rounds: 28 September 2019 – 14 December 2019 Competition Proper: 14 December 2019 – 3 May 2021

Final positions
- Champions: Harrogate Town (1st title)
- Runners-up: Concord Rangers

The 2019–20 FA Trophy (known for sponsorship reasons as the Buildbase FA Trophy) was the 51st season of the FA Trophy, with the final between Harrogate Town A.F.C. and Concord Rangers F.C.. The FA Trophy is an annual football competition for teams at levels 5-8 of the English National League System. The competition consisted of two preliminary rounds, three qualifying rounds, and six proper rounds. All matches until the semi-finals were held as a single-match knockout format with reversed replays after first-leg matches drawn in regulation time. The semi-finals were scheduled to be two-legged, but due to their delay by the COVID-19 pandemic in the United Kingdom they were shifted to single matches, with no replays. The final was a single-match held at Wembley Stadium and decided in extra time or penalties if tied after regulation. First-leg ties throughout the competition could be decided by extra time or penalties if both teams agree and notify the referee at least 45 minutes before kickoff, in accordance with FA Trophy Rule 11(a).

The competition was paused at the semi-final stage due to the COVID-19 pandemic. The competition resumed in September 2020,

== Calendar ==
The calendar for the 2019–20 Buildbase FA Trophy, as announced by The Football Association.

Round	Main Date	Number of Fixtures	Clubs Remaining	New Entries This Round	Prize Money
Extra preliminary round	28 September 2019	28	296 → 268	56	£ 2,000
Preliminary round	12 October 2019	56	268 → 212	84	£ 3,000
First round qualifying	26 October 2019	72	212 → 140	88	£ 3,250
Second round qualifying	9 November 2019	36	140 → 104	0	£ 4,000
Third round qualifying	23 November 2019	40	104 → 64	44	£ 5,000
First round proper	14 December 2019	32	64 → 32	24	£ 6,000
Second round proper	11 January 2020	16	32 → 16	0	£ 7,000
Third round proper	8 February 2020	8	16 → 8	0	£ 8,000
Fourth round proper	29 February 2020	4	8 → 4	0	£ 10,000
Semi-finals	September 2020	2	4 → 2	0	£ 20,000
Final	3 May 2021	1	2 → 1	0	Runners-up £ 30,000; Winners £ 60,000

== Extra preliminary round ==
Tie	Home team (tier)	Score	Away team (tier)	Att.
Saturday 28 September 2019
1	Colne (8)	2–1	Marske United (8)	179
2	Cleethorpes Town (8)	1–0	Frickley Athletic (8)	171
3	Runcorn Linnets (8)	1–0	Marine (8)	355
4	City of Liverpool (8)	P–P	Tadcaster Albion (8)	
5	Ossett United (8)	1–0	Widnes (8)	287
6	Clitheroe (8)	2–1	Sheffield (8)	272
7	Daventry Town (8)	1–1	Kidsgrove Athletic (8)	118
8	Lincoln United (8)	1–3	Bury Town (8)	175
9	Chasetown (8)	5–1	Spalding United (8)	139
10	Dereham Town (8)	1–2	Halesowen Town (8)	153
11	Biggleswade (8)	2–2	Bedford Town (8)	219
12	Carlton Town (8)	3–1	St. Neots Town (8)	92
13	Kempston Rovers (8)	0–1	Wisbech Town (8)	102
14	Stamford (8)	5–1	Loughborough Dynamo (8)	150
15	Heybridge Swifts (8)	4–1	Hertford Town (8)	162
16	Maldon & Tiptree (8)	5–0	Felixstowe & Walton United (8)	120
17	Ramsgate (8)	2–2	Haywards Heath Town (8)	153
18	Bracknell Town (8)	2–1	Coggeshall Town (8)	243
19	Chichester City (8)	2–1	Three Bridges (8)	170
20	Hullbridge Sports (8)	2–4	Barton Rovers (8)	78
21	Harlow Town (8)	1–1	Hanwell Town (8)	143

Tie	Home team (tier)	Score	Away team (tier)	Att.
22	Welwyn Garden City (8)	1–4	Canvey Island (8)	187
23	Faversham Town (8)	1–3	Chertsey Town (8)	180
24	Chalfont St. Peter (8)	0–1	Whitstable Town (8)	84
25	Bristol Manor Farm (8)	7–1	Moneyfields (8)	78
26	Thame United (8)	1–1	Kidlington (8)	127
27	Basingstoke Town (8)	4–3	North Leigh (8)	82
Match at North Leigh.
28	Mangotsfield United (8)	1–2	Slimbridge (8)	142
Tuesday 1 October 2019
4	City of Liverpool (8)	1–1	Tadcaster Albion (8)	301
Replays
Monday 30 September 2019
7R	Kidsgrove Athletic (8)	2–0	Daventry Town (8)	89
Tuesday 1 October 2019
11R	Bedford Town (8)	1–0 (a.e.t.)	Biggleswade (8)	169
17R	Haywards Heath Town (8)	1–0	Ramsgate (8)	102
21R	Hanwell Town (8)	4–1	Harlow Town (8)	64
Wednesday 2 October 2019
26R	Kidlington (8)	1–2	Thame United (8)	65
Tuesday 8 October 2019
4R	Tadcaster Albion (8)	6–1	City of Liverpool (8)	271

== Preliminary round ==
Tie	Home team (tier)	Score	Away team (tier)	Att.
Saturday 12 October 2019
1	Tadcaster Albion (8)	P–P	Brighouse Town (8)	
2	Pontefract Collieries (8)	2–0	Glossop North End (8)	154
3	Clitheroe (8)	0–3	Prescot Cables (8)	395
5	Trafford (8)	0–3	Runcorn Linnets (8)	352
6	Ramsbottom United (8)	1–3	Colne (8)	375
7	Worksop Town (8)	2–1	Kendal Town (8)	410
8	Cleethorpes Town (8)	2–4	Mossley (8)	204
Mossley removed from competition for fielding ineligible player.
9	Dunston (8)	3–2	Ossett United (8)	314
10	Droylsden (8)	1–1	Workington (8)	199
11	Soham Town Rangers (8)	3–0	Bury Town (8)	217
12	Sutton Coldfield Town (8)	2–1	Yaxley (8)	240
13	Newcastle Town (8)	2–5	Leek Town (8)	334
14	Evesham United (8)	1–1	Halesowen Town (8)	382
15	Chasetown (8)	3–0	Coleshill Town (8)	232
16	Belper Town (8)	0–3	Stamford (8)	437
17	Histon (8)	0–0	Corby Town (8)	213
19	Kidsgrove Athletic (8)	1–0	Wisbech Town (8)	155
20	Carlton Town (8)	3–2	Bedford Town (8)	119
21	Bedworth United (8)	3–1	Ilkeston Town (8)	152
22	Staines Town (8)	0–2	Heybridge Swifts (8)	106
23	Aylesbury United (8)	2–2	Sevenoaks Town (8)	134
24	Grays Athletic (8)	0–3	Bedfont Sports (8)	148
Match ordered replayed because of ineligible Bedfont Sports player.
25	Whitehawk (8)	2–1	Romford (8)	267
26	Whitstable Town (8)	2–2	Ware (8)	282
27	Hanwell Town (8)	2–4	AFC Dunstable (8)	134
28	Brentwood Town (8)	2–3	Basildon United (8)	159
29	Sittingbourne (8)	1–0	South Park (8)	157
30	Chipstead (8)	2–1	FC Romania (8)	74
31	VCD Athletic (8)	1–4	AFC Sudbury (8)	80
32	Great Wakering Rovers (8)	3–5	Westfield (8)	71
33	Uxbridge (8)	4–1	Northwood (8)	90
34	East Grinstead Town (8)	P–P	Aveley (8)	
35	Berkhamsted (8)	5–0	Herne Bay (8)	179
36	Whyteleafe (8)	1–3	Tooting & Mitcham United (8)	174
37	Burgess Hill Town (8)	0–2	Phoenix Sports (8)	235
38	Barton Rovers (8)	4–2	Chichester City (8)	95
39	Ashford United (8)	2–2	Witham Town (8)	252
40	Barking (8)	2–1	Guernsey (8)	118

Tie	Home team (tier)	Score	Away team (tier)	Att.
41	Hythe Town (8)	1–2	Hastings United (8)	366
42	Maldon & Tiptree (8)	5–2	Cray Valley (PM) (8)	156
43	Tilbury (8)	6–2	Waltham Abbey (8)	80
44	Ashford Town (8)	2–2	Canvey Island (8)	104
45	Haywards Heath Town (8)	2–1	Bracknell Town (8)	96
46	Marlow (8)	1–0	Chertsey Town (8)	202
47	Highworth Town (8)	1–1	Cinderford Town (8)	140
48	Barnstaple Town (8)	1–3	Thatcham Town (8)	113
49	Paulton Rovers (8)	0–3	Willand Rovers (8)	103
Willand Rovers removed from competition for fielding ineligible player.
50	Slimbridge (8)	0–1	AFC Totton (8)	87
51	Melksham Town (8)	2–0	Wantage Town (8)	205
52	Frome Town (8)	2–1	Bideford (8)	252
53	Didcot Town (8)	0–2	Larkhall Athletic (8)	252
54	Cirencester Town (8)	2–3	Basingstoke Town (8)	137
55	Winchester City (8)	P–P	Thame United (8)	
56	Sholing (8)	2–1	Bristol Manor Farm (8)	112
Sunday 13 October 2019
4	Pickering Town (8)	1–1	Stocksbridge Park Steels (8)	130
18	Cambridge City (8)	2–1	Market Drayton Town (8)	186
Tuesday 15 October 2019
1	Tadcaster Albion (8)	1–2	Brighouse Town (8)	308
Brighouse Town removed from competition for fielding ineligible player.
34	East Grinstead Town (8)	0–5	Aveley (8)	73
55	Winchester City (8)	3–3	Thame United (8)	98
Wednesday 6 November 2019
24	Grays Athletic (8)	0–1	Bedfont Sports (8)	111
Replays
Tuesday 15 October 2019
4R	Stocksbridge Park Steels (8)	1–3 (a.e.t.)	Pickering Town (8)	82
10R	Workington (8)	3–1	Droylsden (8)	401
14R	Halesowen Town (8)	3–0	Evesham United (8)	389
23R	Sevenoaks Town (8)	2–4	Aylesbury United (8)	145
26R	Ware (8)	1–0 (a.e.t.)	Whitstable Town (8)	145
39R	Witham Town (8)	0–2 (a.e.t.)	Ashford United (8)	104
44R	Canvey Island (8)	5–0	Ashford Town (8)	156
47R	Cinderford Town (8)	2–1	Highworth Town (8)	103
Wednesday 16 October 2019
17R	Corby Town (8)	4–1	Histon (8)	290
Tuesday 22 October 2019
55R	Thame United (8)	5–3	Winchester City (8)	102

== First round qualifying ==
Tie	Home team (tier)	Score	Away team (tier)	Att.
Friday 25 October 2019
22	Cambridge City (8)	0–3	Needham Market (7)	163
Saturday 26 October 2019
1	Buxton (7)	3–2	Hyde United (7)	360
2	Prescot Cables (8)	P–P	Pickering Town (8)	
3	Whitby Town (7)	P–P	Worksop Town (8)	
4	Lancaster City (7)	1–0	Witton Albion (7)	288
5	Nantwich Town (7)	P–P	Bamber Bridge (7)	
6	Atherton Collieries (7)	P–P	Scarborough Athletic (7)	
7	Morpeth Town (7)	6–1	Cleethorpes Town (8)	502
8	Runcorn Linnets (8)	P–P	Pontefract Collieries (8)	
9	Brighouse Town (8)	P–P	Workington (8)	
10	Warrington Town (7)	0–1	Ashton United (7)	327
11	Dunston (8)	P–P	Gainsborough Trinity (7)	
12	Radcliffe (7)	P–P	FC United of Manchester (7)	
13	Kidsgrove Athletic (8)	P–P	Colne (8)	
14	Stalybridge Celtic (7)	P–P	South Shields (7)	
15	Redditch United (7)	4–2	Corby Town (8)	200
16	AFC Rushden & Diamonds (7)	0–0	Banbury United (7)	315
17	Leek Town (8)	P–P	Chasetown (8)	
18	Halesowen Town (8)	P–P	Stamford (8)	
19	Stourbridge (7)	P–P	Nuneaton Borough (7)	
20	Peterborough Sports (7)	P–P	Alvechurch (7)	
21	Biggleswade Town (7)	2–1	Bedworth United (8)	126
23	Carlton Town (8)	P–P	Matlock Town (7)	
24	Lowestoft Town (7)	2–4	Coalville Town (7)	264
25	Basford United (7)	3–0	Mickleover Sports (7)	352
26	St. Ives Town (7)	0–0	Soham Town Rangers (8)	231
27	Grantham Town (7)	5–3	Rushall Olympic (7)	215
28	Tamworth (7)	4–0	Leiston (7)	385
29	Sutton Coldfield Town (8)	2–1	Stafford Rangers (7)	196
30	Stratford Town (7)	P–P	Hednesford Town (7)	
31	Bromsgrove Sporting (7)	P–P	Barwell (7)	
32	Folkestone Invicta (7)	2–0	Lewes (7)	332
33	AFC Sudbury (8)	2–0	Harrow Borough (7)	148
34	Haywards Heath Town (8)	3–1	Aylesbury United (8)	109
35	Carshalton Athletic (7)	3–1	Merstham (7)	286
36	Uxbridge (8)	1–3	Bognor Regis Town (7)	136
37	Westfield (8)	1–0	Beaconsfield Town (7)	75
38	Hitchin Town (7)	P–P	Bedfont Sports (8)	
39	Ashford United (8)	1–2	Barton Rovers (8)	201
40	Hornchurch (7)	3–1	Berkhamsted (8)	133
41	Haringey Borough (7)	3–0	Horsham (7)	285
42	Maldon & Tiptree (8)	3–0	Cray Wanderers (7)	145
43	Bishop's Stortford (7)	1–1	Enfield Town (7)	317
44	Heybridge Swifts (8)	1–2	Potters Bar Town (7)	178
45	Brightlingsea Regent (7)	1–2	Royston Town (7)	121
46	Metropolitan Police (7)	4–3	Tilbury (8)	104
47	Leatherhead (7)	3–0	Ware (8)	225
48	Aveley (8)	3–0	Bowers & Pitsea (7)	127
49	Sittingbourne (8)	0–1	Tooting & Mitcham United (8)	180
50	Chipstead (8)	3–3	Canvey Island (8)	87
51	Whitehawk (8)	4–1	Hendon (7)	207
52	Barking (8)	0–0	Margate (7)	110
53	Wingate & Finchley (7)	1–1	Hayes & Yeading United (7)	126
54	Kingstonian (7)	4–2	Corinthian-Casuals (7)	417
55	AFC Dunstable (8)	0–4	Hastings United (8)	112
56	Phoenix Sports (8)	3–5	Kings Langley (7)	90
57	Cheshunt (7)	1–2	East Thurrock United (7)	115
58	Basildon United (8)	5–3	Chesham United (7)	96
59	Worthing (7)	2–1	Walton Casuals (7)	356
60	Yate Town (7)	P–P	Tiverton Town (7)	
61	Melksham Town (8)	1–0	Basingstoke Town (8)	206

Tie	Home team (tier)	Score	Away team (tier)	Att.
62	Truro City (7)	P–P	Blackfield & Langley (7)	
63	Poole Town (7)	P–P	Hartley Wintney (7)	
64	Thame United (8)	1–2	Frome Town (8)	74
65	Marlow (8)	0–0	Sholing (8)	110
66	Salisbury (7)	3–3	Dorchester Town (7)	342
68	Wimborne Town (7)	2–2	Taunton Town (7)	232
69	Swindon Supermarine (7)	P–P	Thatcham Town (8)	
70	Gosport Borough (7)	3–1	Farnborough (7)	234
71	AFC Totton (8)	3–2 (a.e.t.)	Weston-super-Mare (7)	148
72	Cinderford Town (8)	P–P	Merthyr Town (7)	
Monday 28 October 2019
13	Kidsgrove Athletic (8)	0–1	Colne (8)	133
Tuesday 29 October 2019
2	Prescot Cables (8)	0–0	Pickering Town (8)	205
3	Whitby Town (7)	4–1	Worksop Town (8)	443
5	Nantwich Town (7)	2–1	Bamber Bridge (7)	243
6	Atherton Collieries (7)	3–2	Scarborough Athletic (7)	212
8	Runcorn Linnets (8)	5–3	Pontefract Collieries (8)	259
11	Dunston (8)	0–4	Gainsborough Trinity (7)	216
12	Radcliffe (7)	0–2	FC United of Manchester (7)	253
14	Stalybridge Celtic (7)	0–2	South Shields (7)	203
17	Leek Town (8)	2–0	Chasetown (8)	268
18	Halesowen Town (8)	2–2	Stamford (8)	306
19	Stourbridge (7)	2–1	Nuneaton Borough (7)	423
20	Peterborough Sports (7)	1–0	Alvechurch (7)	170
30	Stratford Town (7)	1–2	Hednesford Town (7)	210
31	Bromsgrove Sporting (7)	2–7	Barwell (7)	544
60	Yate Town (7)	3–3	Tiverton Town (7)	153
62	Truro City (7)	P–P	Blackfield & Langley (7)	
63	Poole Town (7)	0–1	Hartley Wintney (7)	261
67	Paulton Rovers (8)	1–1	Larkhall Athletic (8)	96
69	Swindon Supermarine (7)	1–4	Thatcham Town (8)	139
72	Cinderford Town (8)	2–2	Merthyr Town (7)	175
Wednesday 30 October 2019
23	Carlton Town (8)	1–2	Matlock Town (7)	142
Tuesday 5 November 2019
9	Tadcaster Albion (8)	0–1	Workington (8)	225
62	Truro City (7)	1–1	Blackfield & Langley (7)	131
Saturday 9 November 2019
38	Hitchin Town (7)	1–1	Bedfont Sports (8)	218
Replays
Tuesday 29 October 2019
16R	Banbury United (7)	1–2	AFC Rushden & Diamonds (7)	310
26R	Soham Town Rangers (8)	3–0	St. Ives Town (7)	202
43R	Enfield Town (7)	4–2 (a.e.t.)	Bishop's Stortford (7)	204
50R	Canvey Island (8)	2–1	Chipstead (8)	151
52R	Margate (7)	2–0	Barking (8)	159
53R	Hayes & Yeading United (7)	2–1	Wingate & Finchley (7)	126
65R	Sholing (8)	2–0	Marlow (8)	135
66R	Dorchester Town (7)	0–3	Salisbury (7)	336
68R	Taunton Town (7)	4–1	Wimborne Town (7)	315
Tuesday 5 November 2019
2R	Pickering Town (8)	0–3	Prescot Cables (8)	99
18R	Stamford (8)	0–3	Halesowen Town (8)	183
72R	Merthyr Town (7)	4–5 (a.e.t.)	Cinderford Town (8)	187
Wednesday 6 November 2019
60R	Tiverton Town (7)	3–3 (1–4 p)	Yate Town (7)	156
67R	Larkhall Athletic (8)	1–3	Paulton Rovers (8)	112
Saturday 9 November 2019
62R	Blackfield & Langley (7)	3–1	Truro City (7)	57
Tuesday 12 November 2019
38R	Bedfont Sports (8)	1–1 (5–4 p)	Hitchin Town (7)	71

== Second round qualifying ==
Tie	Home team (tier)	Score	Away team (tier)	Att.
Saturday 9 November 2019
1	Halesowen Town (8)	2–1	Grantham Town (7)	493
2	Matlock Town (7)	1–0	Ashton United (7)	284
3	Atherton Collieries (7)	2–1	Morpeth Town (7)	216
4	Sutton Coldfield Town (8)	1–5	Hednesford Town (7)	296
5	Peterborough Sports (7)	2–0	Whitby Town (7)	202
6	South Shields (7)	4–0	AFC Rushden & Diamonds (7)	934
7	Barwell (7)	P–P	Redditch United (7)	
8	Colne (8)	3–1	Buxton (7)	191
9	Runcorn Linnets (8)	1–1	Prescot Cables (8)	408
10	FC United of Manchester (7)	3–1	Basford United (7)	907
12	Leek Town (8)	1–3	Workington (8)	321
13	Tamworth (7)	3–5	Gainsborough Trinity (7)	515
15	Margate (7)	0–4	Tooting & Mitcham United (8)	312
16	Haringey Borough (7)	2–1	Canvey Island (8)	323
17	Yate Town (7)	6–3	AFC Totton (8)	230
18	Royston Town (7)	7–0	Haywards Heath Town (8)	225
19	Bognor Regis Town (7)	3–1	East Thurrock United (7)	302
20	Westfield (8)	1–1	Hartley Wintney (7)	122
21	Basildon United (8)	1–6	Hornchurch (7)	163
22	Taunton Town (7)	3–3	Aveley (8)	474
23	Worthing (7)	1–4	AFC Sudbury (8)	521
24	Hastings United (8)	2–2	Whitehawk (8)	470
26	Sholing (8)	P–P	Barton Rovers (8)	
29	Salisbury (7)	2–1	Kings Langley (7)	445
32	Enfield Town (7)	5–0	Thatcham Town (8)	248
33	Gosport Borough (7)	4–2	Melksham Town (8)	235
34	Cinderford Town (8)	1–0	Potters Bar Town (7)	103

Tie	Home team (tier)	Score	Away team (tier)	Att.
35	Needham Market (7)	1–2	Leatherhead (7)	203
36	Metropolitan Police (7)	2–2	Biggleswade Town (7)	203
Tuesday 12 November 2019
7	Barwell (7)	3–3	Redditch United (7)	129
11	Nantwich Town (7)	0–1	Coalville Town (7)	208
14	Stourbridge (7)	2–2	Lancaster City (7)	315
25	Carshalton Athletic (7)	5–3	Frome Town (8)	197
26	Sholing (8)	2–1	Barton Rovers (8)	116
Wednesday 13 November 2019
27	Blackfield & Langley (7)	0–3	Kingstonian (7)	85
28	Maldon & Tiptree (8)	4–3	Folkestone Invicta (7)	196
30	Hayes & Yeading United (7)	4–2	Soham Town Rangers (8)	144
Tuesday 19 November 2019
31	Bedfont Sports (8)	0–5	Paulton Rovers (8)	81
Replays
Monday 11 November 2019
22R	Aveley (8)	2–1	Taunton Town (7)	167
Tuesday 12 November 2019
9R	Prescot Cables (8)	1–2	Runcorn Linnets (8)	452
20R	Hartley Wintney (7)	2–1	Westfield (8)	153
24R	Whitehawk (8)	1–2	Hastings United (8)	157
36R	Biggleswade Town (7)	P–P	Metropolitan Police (7)	
Tuesday 19 November 2019
7R	Redditch United (7)	3–2	Barwell (7)	111
36R	Biggleswade Town (7)	1–0	Metropolitan Police (7)	92
Saturday 23 November 2019
14R	Lancaster City (7)	1–2	Stourbridge (7)	241

== Third round qualifying ==
Tie	Home team (tier)	Score	Away team (tier)	Att.
Saturday 23 November 2019
1	Curzon Ashton (6)	3–0	Kidderminster Harriers (6)	266
2	York City (6)	0–1	Altrincham (6)	974
3	Workington (8)	0–1	Farsley Celtic (6)	461
4	Hednesford Town (7)	2–1	Coalville Town (7)	354
5	Runcorn Linnets (8)	0–3	FC United of Manchester (7)	962
6	Darlington (6)	2–1	Gainsborough Trinity (7)	770
8	Blyth Spartans (6)	1–1	Alfreton Town (6)	526
9	Brackley Town (6)	0–1	Chester (6)	334
11	Guiseley (6)	0–4	AFC Telford United (6)	345
12	Matlock Town (7)	2–0	Redditch United (7)	259
13	Colne (8)	2–3	Southport (6)	312
14	King's Lynn Town (6)	0–0	Hereford (6)	846
15	Atherton Collieries (7)	1–0	Boston United (6)	303
16	Peterborough Sports (7)	0–3	Kettering Town (6)	436
17	Halesowen Town (8)	1–0	Gateshead (6)	546
18	Leamington (6)	2–1	Spennymoor Town (6)	275
19	Dulwich Hamlet (6)	2–2	Chippenham Town (6)	972
20	Bath City (6)	0–0	Gosport Borough (7)	528
21	Sholing (8)	P–P	Paulton Rovers (8)	
22	Tonbridge Angels (6)	2–1	Bognor Regis Town (7)	457
23	Weymouth (6)	1–0	Hastings United (8)	734
24	Chelmsford City (6)	2–1	Hungerford Town (6)	361
25	Havant & Waterlooville (6)	3–1	Cinderford Town (8)	385
26	Carshalton Athletic (7)	2–1	Tooting & Mitcham United (8)	466
27	Enfield Town (7)	4–3	Maldon & Tiptree (8)	278
28	Braintree Town (6)	1–2	Yate Town (7)	202
29	Biggleswade Town (7)	1–4	Aveley (8)	156
30	Kingstonian (7)	2–1	AFC Sudbury (8)	294
31	Eastbourne Borough (6)	3–1	Hartley Wintney (7)	278
32	Leatherhead (7)	0–3	Dorking Wanderers (6)	599
33	Concord Rangers (6)	0–0	Slough Town (6)	295

Tie	Home team (tier)	Score	Away team (tier)	Att.
34	Maidstone United (6)	2–2	Dartford (6)	1,255
35	Haringey Borough (7)	1–4	Hemel Hempstead Town (6)	234
36	Wealdstone (6)	2–3	Royston Town (7)	396
37	Oxford City (6)	1–1	Hornchurch (7)	228
38	Billericay Town (6)	P–P	Hampton & Richmond Borough (6)	
39	Welling United (6)	3–1	St. Albans City (6)	337
40	Salisbury (7)	4–3	Hayes & Yeading United (7)	454
Sunday 24 November 2019
7	Gloucester City (6)	0–2	Bradford (Park Avenue) (6)	251
Tuesday 26 November 2019
10	Stourbridge (7)	1–1	South Shields (7)	356
21	Sholing (8)	P–P	Paulton Rovers (8)	
38	Billericay Town (6)	1–2	Hampton & Richmond Borough (6)	353
Tuesday 3 December 2019
21	Sholing (8)	0–0	Paulton Rovers (8)	105
Replays
Tuesday 26 November 2019
8R	Alfreton Town (6)	P–P	Blyth Spartans (6)	
14R	Hereford (6)	0–3	King's Lynn Town (6)	715
19R	Chippenham Town (6)	1–2	Dulwich Hamlet (6)	245
33R	Slough Town (6)	2–3	Concord Rangers (6)	295
34R	Dartford (6)	0–1	Maidstone United (6)	701
37R	Hornchurch (7)	4–4 (4–1 p)	Oxford City (6)	139
Wednesday 27 November 2019
20R	Gosport Borough (7)	2–3 (a.e.t.)	Bath City (6)	306
Tuesday 3 December 2019
8R	Alfreton Town (6)	1–3	Blyth Spartans (6)	165
10R	South Shields (7)	4–0	Stourbridge (7)	612
Tuesday 10 December 2019
21R	Paulton Rovers (8)	P–P	Sholing (8)	
Saturday 14 December 2019
21R	Paulton Rovers (8)	1–2	Sholing (8)	136

== First round proper ==
Tie	Home team (tier)	Score	Away team (tier)	Att.
Saturday 14 December 2019
1	Solihull Moors (5)	2–2	Darlington (6)	500
2	South Shields (7)	2–2	Southport (6)	776
3	Bradford (Park Avenue) (6)	2–2	Halesowen Town (8)	285
4	Harrogate Town (5)	3–2	Hartlepool United (5)	803
5	Stockport County (5)	4–2	Blyth Spartans (6)	1,436
6	Chesterfield (5)	0–1	Notts County (5)	931
7	Hednesford Town (7)	0–0	Chester (6)	565
8	FC Halifax Town (5)	4–0	Wrexham (5)	752
9	AFC Telford United (6)	P–P	Leamington (6)	
10	Farsley Celtic (6)	2–2	Altrincham (6)	253
11	Matlock Town (7)	2–2	Chorley (5)	400
12	FC United of Manchester (7)	2–1	Kettering Town (6)	1,218
13	AFC Fylde (5)	1–0	Curzon Ashton (6)	
14	Atherton Collieries (7)	P–P	Barrow (5)	
15	Yeovil Town (5)	3–1	Welling United (6)	1,554
16	Hornchurch (7)	1–0	Dulwich Hamlet (6)	454
17	King's Lynn Town (6)	2–2 (4–2 p)	Dover Athletic (5)	776
18	Carshalton Athletic (7)	3–3	Aveley (8)	349
19	Eastleigh (5)	6–1	Yate Town (7)	353
20	Tonbridge Angels (6)	2–2	Hampton & Richmond Borough (6)	412
21	Barnet (5)	2–1	Weymouth (6)	624
23	Chelmsford City (6)	2–1	Havant & Waterlooville (6)	
24	Enfield Town (7)	0–2	Ebbsfleet United (5)	417
25	Eastbourne Borough (6)	2–2	Salisbury (7)	371
26	Maidenhead United (5)	4–2	Hemel Hempstead Town (6)	387
27	Sutton United (5)	1–1	Dagenham & Redbridge (5)	
28	Maidstone United (6)	2–3	Concord Rangers (6)	

Tie	Home team (tier)	Score	Away team (tier)	Att.
29	Torquay United (5)	5–1	Aldershot Town (5)	1,068
31	Dorking Wanderers (6)	3–0	Bromley (5)	
32	Royston Town (7)	2–0	Boreham Wood (5)	478
Sunday 15 December 2019
22	Kingstonian (7)	3–1	Woking (5)	655
Tuesday 17 December 2019
9	AFC Telford United (6)	0–5	Leamington (6)	
14	Atherton Collieries (7)	2–2	Barrow (5)	468
30	Bath City (6)	2–0	Sholing (8)	401
Replays
Monday 16 December 2019
18R	Aveley (8)	2–0	Carshalton Athletic (7)	186
Tuesday 17 December 2019
2R	Southport (6)	3–1	South Shields (7)	372
3R	Halesowen Town (8)	2–0	Bradford (Park Avenue) (6)	426
7R	Chester (6)	2–1	Hednesford Town (7)	613
10R	Altrincham (6)	1–2 (a.e.t.)	Farsley Celtic (6)	
11R	Chorley (5)	2–2 (3–4 p)	Matlock Town (7)	675
20R	Hampton & Richmond Borough (6)	2–0	Tonbridge Angels (6)	238
25R	Salisbury (7)	P–P	Eastbourne Borough (6)	
27R	Dagenham & Redbridge (5)	3–2 (a.e.t.)	Sutton United (5)	417
Wednesday 18 December 2019
1R	Darlington (6)	P–P	Solihull Moors (5)	
Tuesday 7 January 2020
14R	Barrow (5)	2–0	Atherton Collieries (7)	861
25R	Salisbury (7)	1–0	Eastbourne Borough (6)	354
Wednesday 8 January 2020
1R	Darlington (6)	1–0	Solihull Moors (5)	

== Second round proper ==
Tie	Home team (tier)	Score	Away team (tier)	Att.
Saturday 11 January 2020
1	Dorking Wanderers (6)	1–1	Stockport County (5)	1,604
2	Kingstonian (7)	1–1	Leamington (6)	529
3	AFC Fylde (5)	4–1	Southport (6)	907
4	Royston Town (7)	3–0	Chester (6)	818
5	Darlington (6)	0–2	Harrogate Town (5)	1,240
6	Yeovil Town (5)	4–0	Hampton & Richmond Borough (6)	1,689
7	Ebbsfleet United (5)	1–0	King's Lynn Town (6)	680
8	Halesowen Town (8)	2–2	Maidenhead United (5)	892
9	Notts County (5)	2–1	Dagenham & Redbridge (5)	2,385
10	Chelmsford City (6)	4–0	Salisbury (7)	557
11	Torquay United (5)	1–2	FC Halifax Town (5)	1,309
12	Eastleigh (5)	2–1	Matlock Town (7)	718
13	Concord Rangers (6)	1–1	Bath City (6)	263
14	Farsley Celtic (6)	1–1	Barnet (5)	402

Tie	Home team (tier)	Score	Away team (tier)	Att.
15	Hornchurch (7)	1–2	Aveley (8)	589
16	Barrow (5)	7–0	FC United of Manchester (7)	1,892
Replays
Tuesday 14 January 2020
1R	Stockport County (5)	0–4	Dorking Wanderers (6)	1,121
2R	Leamington (6)	1–0	Kingstonian (7)	303
8R	Maidenhead United (5)	P–P	Halesowen Town (8)	
13R	Bath City (6)	P–P	Concord Rangers (6)	
14R	Barnet (5)	P–P	Farsley Celtic (6)	
Tuesday 21 January 2020
8R	Maidenhead United (5)	1–3	Halesowen Town (8)	275
13R	Bath City (6)	P–P	Concord Rangers (6)	
14R	Barnet (5)	P–P	Farsley Celtic (6)	
Tuesday 28 January 2020
13R	Bath City (6)	1–2	Concord Rangers (6)	
14R	Barnet (5)	2–0	Farsley Celtic (6)	333

== Third round proper ==
Tie	Home team (tier)	Score	Away team (tier)	Att.
Saturday 8 February 2020
1	Ebbsfleet United (5)	0–2 (a.e.t.)	Royston Town (7)	900
2	Concord Rangers (6)	2–2 (4–3 p)	Leamington (6)	417
3	Harrogate Town (5)	2–0	Eastleigh (5)	947
4	FC Halifax Town (5)	0–1	Halesowen Town (8)	1,483
5	Barnet (5)	3–0	Barrow (5)	763
6	Dorking Wanderers (6)	2–4	AFC Fylde (5)	1,594
7	Aveley (8)	3–1	Chelmsford City (6)	811
8	Yeovil Town (5)	1–2	Notts County (5)	1,946

== Fourth round proper ==
Tie	Home team (tier)	Score	Away team (tier)	Att.
Saturday 29 February 2020
1	Barnet (5)	1–2 (a.e.t.)	Halesowen Town (8)	1,483
2	Notts County (5)	5–0	Aveley (8)	4,893
3	Concord Rangers (6)	P–P	Royston Town (7)	
4	AFC Fylde (5)	2–3 (a.e.t.)	Harrogate Town (5)	803
Tuesday 3 March 2020
3	Concord Rangers (6)	2–1 (a.e.t.)	Royston Town (7)	852

== Semi-finals ==
Originally scheduled for March 2020, the two-legged semi-finals were postponed due to the COVID-19 pandemic. The FA declared their intention to complete the tournament, but with an uncertain timeframe. In late August 2020, they scheduled the semi-finals as single matches in September, with a date of 27 September for the final at Wembley. The final, alongside the FA Vase final held as part of the same event, was to be among the matches trialling the return of spectators to elite football after the height of the first wave of the pandemic in the UK, but this was further postponed following new restrictions on gatherings in England that were enacted on 14 September 2020 as COVID-19 cases increased.

5 September 2020
15:00

Concord Rangers (6)	2–1	Halesowen Town (8)
Evans 38' (o.g.); Wall 80'	Report	Gregory 7'

Thames Road, Canvey Island
Attendance: 0
Referee: Sam Purkiss

22 September 2020
19:45

Notts County (5)	0–1	Harrogate Town (5) (Note: Between the fourth round and the semi-finals, Harrogate were promoted to the Football League through the National League play-offs after the season had finished on an average points-per-game basis due to curtailment as a result of the COVID-19 pandemic.)
	Report	Smith 45+1'

Meadow Lane, Nottingham
Attendance: 0
Referee: Will Finnie

== Final ==
The final was rescheduled for 27 September 2020 however this was postponed as the FA hoped to have spectators in the final. The date was then agreed for 3 May 2021 behind closed doors as a suitable solution could not be reached to be played with fans.

3 May 2021
17:00

Concord Rangers	0–1	Harrogate Town
	Report	Falkingham 76'

Wembley Stadium, London
Attendance: 0
Referee: Peter Bankes
