= 1979–80 Sussex County Football League =

The 1979–80 Sussex County Football League season was the 55th in the history of Sussex County Football League a football competition in England.

== Division One ==
Sussex County Football League Division One
- Season: 1979–80
- Champions: Chichester City
- Relegated: Haywards Heath; Rye United
- Matches: 240
- Goals: 734 (3.06 per match)

Division One featured 14 clubs which competed in the division last season, along with two new clubs, promoted from Division Two:

- Pagham
- Portfield

Also, Steyning changed name to Steyning Town.

=== League table ===
Pos	Team	Pld	W	D	L	GF	GA	GR	Pts	Qualification or relegation
1	Chichester City	30	21	5	4	66	30	2.200	47	
2	Southwick	30	19	7	4	63	25	2.520	45	
3	Burgess Hill Town	30	18	6	6	65	37	1.757	42	
4	Pagham	30	15	9	6	52	31	1.677	39	
5	Eastbourne Town	30	13	9	8	50	37	1.351	35	
6	Littlehampton Town	30	13	8	9	39	34	1.147	34	
7	Steyning Town	30	12	8	10	59	41	1.439	32	
8	Shoreham	30	13	8	9	48	37	1.297	32 (Note: Shoreham were deducted two points.)	
9	Horsham YMCA	30	13	5	12	46	38	1.211	31	
10	Ringmer	30	13	4	13	51	36	1.417	30	
11	Arundel	30	9	10	11	42	41	1.024	28	
12	Peacehaven & Telscombe	30	10	7	13	40	54	0.741	27	
13	Bexhill Town	30	7	4	19	30	76	0.395	18	
14	Portfield	30	6	4	20	37	69	0.536	16	
15	Haywards Heath	30	4	7	19	24	54	0.444	15	Relegated to Division Two
16	Rye United	30	2	3	25	22	94	0.234	7	Relegated to Division Two

Source: nonleaguematters
Rules for classification: 1) points; 2) goal ratio.

== Division Two ==
Sussex County Football League Division Two
- Season: 1979–80
- Champions: Hastings Town
- Promoted: Hastings Town; Three Bridges
- Matches: 182
- Goals: 553 (3.04 per match)

Division Two featured twelve clubs which competed in the division last season, along with two new clubs relegated from Division One:

- East Grinstead
- Sidley United

=== League table ===
Pos	Team	Pld	W	D	L	GF	GA	GR	Pts	Qualification or relegation
1	Hastings Town	26	18	4	4	68	22	3.091	40	Promoted to Division One
2	Three Bridges	26	17	5	4	59	16	3.688	39	Promoted to Division One
3	Hailsham Town	26	16	7	3	52	27	1.926	39	
4	Wick	26	14	4	8	44	27	1.630	32	
5	Newhaven	26	11	7	8	39	34	1.147	29	
6	Crowborough Athletic	26	10	7	9	39	35	1.114	27	
7	East Grinstead	26	11	4	11	34	39	0.872	26	
8	Whitehawk	26	8	9	9	37	40	0.925	25	
9	Storrington	26	11	3	12	41	48	0.854	25	
10	Lancing	26	8	5	13	34	38	0.895	21	
11	Sidley United	26	7	4	15	38	69	0.551	18	
12	Albion United	26	5	7	14	19	43	0.442	17	
13	Selsey	26	4	6	16	22	54	0.407	14	
14	Wigmore Athletic	26	4	4	18	27	61	0.443	12	

Source: nonleaguematters
Rules for classification: 1) points; 2) goal ratio.
