= 2019–20 Isthmian League =

The 2019–20 season was the 105th season of the Isthmian League, which is an English football competition featuring semi-professional and amateur clubs from London, East and South East England. This was the second season to consist of four divisions after the league reorganised the former South Division into the new South Central and South East divisions.

As a result of the COVID-19 pandemic, this season's competition was formally abandoned on 26 March 2020, with all results from the season being expunged, and no promotion or relegation taking place to, from, or within the competition. On 30 March 2020, sixty-six non-league clubs sent an open letter to the Football Association requesting that they reconsider their decision. A legal appeal against the decision, funded by South Shields of the Northern Premier League, was dismissed in June 2020.

== Premier Division ==
Isthmian League Premier Division
- Season: 2019–20
- Matches: 355
- Goals: 1,046 (2.95 per match)
- Top goalscorer: 26 goals - Joseph Taylor (Cray Wanderers)
- Highest attendance: 1684 - Worthing 3–0 Bognor Regis Town
- Total attendance: 122,555
- Average attendance: 345 (-11.1% to previous season)

The Premier Division consisted of 22 clubs, including 17 clubs from the previous season, and five new clubs:

- Bowers & Pitsea, promoted from the North Division
- Cheshunt, promoted from the South Central Division
- Cray Wanderers, promoted from the South East Division
- East Thurrock United, relegated from the National League South
- Horsham, promoted from the South East Division

=== League table ===
Pos	Team	Pld	W	D	L	GF	GA	GD	Pts
1	Worthing	34	21	8	5	72	41	+31	71
2	Cray Wanderers	33	18	10	5	63	45	+18	64
3	Hornchurch	33	17	11	5	62	28	+34	62
4	Folkestone Invicta	32	18	8	6	60	34	+26	62
5	Carshalton Athletic	34	18	8	8	59	38	+21	62
6	Horsham	33	17	6	10	51	35	+16	57
7	Enfield Town	32	16	8	8	61	51	+10	56
8	Bognor Regis Town	32	16	5	11	58	46	+12	53
9	Leatherhead	31	15	7	9	48	42	+6	52
10	Kingstonian	31	11	14	6	42	36	+6	47
11	East Thurrock United	30	14	4	12	47	40	+7	46
12	Margate	33	11	10	12	47	54	−7	43
13	Potters Bar Town	32	11	8	13	47	56	−9	41
14	Bowers & Pitsea	33	11	7	15	49	42	+7	40
15	Haringey Borough	30	11	6	13	44	47	−3	39
16	Lewes	34	8	7	19	35	55	−20	31
17	Bishop's Stortford	32	8	4	20	37	63	−26	28
18	Cheshunt	31	8	3	20	39	59	−20	27
19	Corinthian-Casuals	31	6	8	17	33	44	−11	26
20	Wingate & Finchley	33	5	10	18	34	58	−24	25
21	Merstham	33	6	7	20	34	70	−36	25
22	Brightlingsea Regent	33	5	9	19	24	62	−38	24

Updated to match(es) played on 11 March 2020. Source: Isthmian League web site
Rules for classification: 1) Points; 2) Goal difference; 3) Number of goals scored; 4) Number of matches won; 5) Head-to-head results

=== Results table ===
Home \ Away	BIS	BOG	B&P	BRI	CAR	CHE	COR	CRA	ETU	ENF	FOL	HAR	HOR	HRM	KIN	LEA	LEW	MAR	MER	POT	W&F	WOR
Bishop's Stortford		3–1	2–2			3–2	1–3	1–5	1–0	0–1		1–2	0–2	2–0	1–2	0–1	0–2	2–2		1–4	0–1	0–1
Bognor Regis Town				3–2	0–2	1–2		7–2		4–1	4–3	2–0		1–1	1–1	5–1		1–2	2–1	0–4		0–3
Bowers & Pitsea	2–0	1–2		7–0	0–1		0–2	1–2	1–2	0–1	3–1	3–2	0–1			3–0		0–1	1–1		1–1	1–2
Brightlingsea Regent	1–0		2–4			1–1	2–1	0–2		0–2	0–0		1–0	0–4	0–2		2–3	1–1	0–0	0–0	1–1	0–3
Carshalton Athletic	4–2	1–0		2–0		2–0		4–0	1–2	2–0	1–1		1–4	4–0	2–2	1–0	1–1	1–0	1–1	5–1	3–2	1–2
Cheshunt	0–1		1–1		0–1		1–1			2–3		0–1		0–1	3–1	1–3	0–2	1–2	3–0	2–0	1–0	1–2
Corinthian-Casuals		1–1	0–1	0–1	2–3	3–1			2–1		0–1		1–1	1–2		3–0	1–0	1–2	0–1	0–0	3–3	
Cray Wanderers			3–1	1–0		6–1	0–0		1–1	3–5	2–3	1–1	1–1	2–1	0–0	0–1	2–1	3–2	3–1	4–0	0–0	2–2
East Thurrock United		3–0	3–1	2–1	2–0	4–1		0–1			1–3	4–2			3–3	3–0	1–0	1–2		1–3	3–1	0–0
Enfield Town	5–0	2–0	0–4	2–2	2–1	2–1	3–1	2–3			1–3	5–3	1–1	1–4			1–1		2–0	2–2	2–2	
Folkestone Invicta	1–0	1–2		3–2	1–3	4–2	3–1		4–1	1–1		1–1	2–1	2–1	1–1	1–1		4–0	3–1		0–1	2–0
Haringey Borough	2–1	2–1	1–1	5–1	2–2		1–0		2–0				1–1	1–2	0–1		0–1	1–0		3–2	2–1	2–2
Hornchurch	4–0	0–0	2–1	3–0		3–0	1–1			4–0	1–0	2–1		2–1	3–0	1–1		2–2	2–2	3–1	2–0	
Horsham	3–3	0–2	4–0		2–2		1–0	1–1	1–0		0–1	2–0	1–0		1–0	1–1	3–0	0–3	4–0	2–0	2–1	
Kingstonian	0–3	0–1	0–0	2–1	3–1	2–4	3–1	0–0	0–0	0–0				1–1			3–1	3–3	4–0			0–0
Leatherhead	3–1	1–2	1–0	1–0	2–1	3–0	2–1		3–0	1–2		2–3	2–1		1–1		1–4		0–0	4–0		
Lewes		0–1	0–2	0–1	0–1	1–6	1–0	2–3	0–3	1–1	0–0	2–1	0–0	0–2	1–2	0–1				3–3	1–2	1–3
Margate	3–4	1–6	1–0	0–0	1–1		2–2	3–4	0–1	0–3		4–2	2–2			0–0	2–0		2–1	2–2	1–0	0–2
Merstham	2–2	2–2	1–3					1–2	2–1	1–4	0–4	1–0	1–2	1–0	0–1	1–4	2–4	1–0		2–3		1–3
Potters Bar Town	1–0	0–1	0–2	4–2	2–0		3–1	1–1		1–2	1–4		2–1	0–2	1–2				2–1			1–1
Wingate & Finchley	1–2	0–5	2–2	0–0	0–2	1–2		0–1	2–1		1–1	1–0	2–3		1–1	1–2	1–1		0–4	1–2		2–3
Worthing		3–0		3–0	1–1	2–0	2–0	1–2	2–3	3–2	0–1		0–6	3–0	2–1	5–5	3–1	2–1	6–1	1–1	4–2	

Updated to match(es) played on 11 March 2020. Source: Premier Division grid
Legend: Blue = home team win; Yellow = draw; Red = away team win.

=== Stadia and locations ===
Locations of the Premier Division clubs
Greater London Premier Division football clubs

Club	Location	Stadium	Capacity
Bishop's Stortford	Bishop's Stortford	Woodside Park	4,525
Bognor Regis Town	Bognor Regis	Nyewood Lane	4,500
Bowers & Pitsea	Pitsea	Len Salmon Stadium	2,000
Brightlingsea Regent	Brightlingsea	North Road	2,000
Carshalton Athletic	Carshalton	War Memorial Sports Ground	5,000
Cheshunt	Cheshunt	Theobalds Lane	3,000
Corinthian-Casuals	Tolworth	King George's Field	2,700
Cray Wanderers	St Mary Cray	Hayes Lane (groundshare with Bromley)	6,000
East Thurrock United	Corringham	Rookery Hill	4,000
Enfield Town	Enfield	Queen Elizabeth II Stadium	2,500
Folkestone Invicta	Folkestone	Cheriton Road	4,000
Haringey Borough	Tottenham	Coles Park	2,500
Hornchurch	Hornchurch	Hornchurch Stadium	3,500
Horsham	Horsham	The Camping World Community Stadium	1,300
Kingstonian	Kingston upon Thames	King George's Field (groundshare with Corinthian-Casuals )	2,700
Leatherhead	Leatherhead	Fetcham Grove	3,400
Lewes	Lewes	The Dripping Pan	3,000
Margate	Margate	Hartsdown Park	3,000
Merstham	Merstham	Moatside	2,000
Potters Bar Town	Potters Bar	Parkfield	2,000
Wingate & Finchley	Finchley	The Maurice Rebak Stadium	1,500
Worthing	Worthing	Woodside Road	4,000

== North Division ==
Isthmian League North Division
- Season: 2019–20
- Matches: 274
- Goals: 895 (3.27 per match)
- Top goalscorer: 20 goals - Alexander Teniola (Heybridge Swifts)
- Highest attendance: 518 - AFC Sudbury 3–0 Bury Town
- Total attendance: 54,506
- Average attendance: 199 (+1.0% to previous season)

North Division consisted of 20 clubs, 17 clubs from the previous season, and three new clubs:

- Cambridge City, transferred from the Southern Football League Division One Central
- Histon, promoted from the Eastern Counties League
- Hullbridge Sports, promoted from the Essex Senior League

=== League table ===
Pos	Team	Pld	W	D	L	GF	GA	GD	Pts
1	Maldon & Tiptree	26	22	2	2	65	20	+45	65 (Note: Maldon & Tiptree were penalised three points for fielding an ineligible player against Soham Town Rangers on 17 August)
2	Aveley	26	14	9	3	66	31	+35	51
3	Tilbury	27	15	5	7	49	30	+19	50
4	Heybridge Swifts	29	15	5	9	54	43	+11	50
5	Bury Town	29	15	5	9	49	41	+8	50
6	Coggeshall Town	26	12	10	4	40	24	+16	46
7	Great Wakering Rovers	28	13	4	11	45	36	+9	43
8	Dereham Town	29	11	8	10	52	43	+9	41
9	Cambridge City	28	12	3	13	42	39	+3	39
10	Canvey Island	27	11	5	11	49	54	−5	38
11	AFC Sudbury	26	11	4	11	42	42	0	37
12	Histon	28	10	6	12	40	53	−13	36
13	Soham Town Rangers	28	10	4	14	41	47	−6	34
14	Grays Athletic	29	9	4	16	41	47	−6	31
15	Witham Town	28	8	5	15	36	63	−27	29
16	Hullbridge Sports	27	7	7	13	33	53	−20	28
17	Brentwood Town	28	7	5	16	41	54	−13	26
18	Felixstowe & Walton United	29	6	7	16	40	62	−22	25
19	Romford	25	7	3	15	41	66	−25	24
20	Basildon United	25	6	5	14	29	47	−18	23

Updated to match(es) played on 11 March 2020. Source: Isthmian League web site
Rules for classification: 1) Points; 2) Goal difference; 3) Number of goals scored; 4) Number of matches won; 5) Head-to-head results

=== Results table ===
Home \ Away	SUD	AVE	BAS	BRE	BUR	CAM	CAN	COG	DER	FEL	GRA	GWR	HEY	HIS	HUL	M&T	ROM	STR	TIL	WIT
AFC Sudbury		3–3	3–0	1–0	3–0	0–2	2–1			0–1			2–1	5–0			4–3	2–4	0–2	3–3
Aveley			4–0	0–0	3–1			1–2		4–3			5–0	3–2	0–0	0–2	6–0	5–1		4–2
Basildon United				3–2				0–0	0–3		4–2	1–1	1–1	0–1			6–0		1–3	1–3
Brentwood Town	3–1	1–3				0–2		0–1	1–3	0–2		2–2	0–1	1–1	3–4	1–2		2–1	4–3	2–0
Bury Town	3–0		3–1	1–1		3–1	0–1	1–1	2–1	4–1	2–1	0–3		2–1	2–2	1–2	3–1	2–1	1–2	
Cambridge City	2–0	1–4	3–2	2–3	1–2			3–2	1–1		1–1	2–4	1–2		0–1		1–0	1–2		
Canvey Island	2–2	1–1	2–1	3–2	0–2	2–1			1–2	3–1	2–1	0–2	4–4	0–3	0–3	1–3		0–1		
Coggeshall Town	3–1			0–1		2–1	3–1		0–2	0–0	1–0	2–0		5–1	3–0			1–1	1–1	4–0
Dereham Town	1–1	2–2		5–2	2–3			4–1				1–4	1–1	0–0	1–1	1–2	3–1	1–2	1–3	5–1
Felixstowe & Walton United			2–0	3–3	1–2	3–1	3–3	2–2	2–3		1–0	1–4	1–2		1–1	0–2	1–2	2–2		
Grays Athletic	1–2	1–6	3–1	4–1	1–2	0–1		0–0	2–2	1–2		1–0	2–3		2–0	1–2	0–0	3–2	3–1	
Great Wakering Rovers	2–0	0–1	0–1		0–2	0–4	1–1	0–0	1–2		3–1			1–3		0–1			2–0	2–0
Heybridge Swifts	0–1	1–1	0–1		1–0	0–1	2–3	1–1		3–1	1–2	4–2			3–2		5–1	3–2		4–1
Histon	1–4	1–1	3–3		3–0	1–0		1–1	4–1	1–0	0–1	4–1	1–3		2–1	0–1			0–2	1–4
Hullbridge Sports	2–0		1–1		3–3	0–5	1–3	0–1	0–2	3–1		1–4	1–3			0–1				0–3
Maldon & Tiptree		3–1	3–0			0–0	5–0		2–1	6–2	3–1		2–1	1–1	5–0		1–3	3–1	1–2	5–1
Romford	1–2	1–4		3–2			1–2	2–3		3–1	1–6	1–4		5–1	1–2			3–3	1–0	2–4
Soham Town Rangers	1–0	1–1	3–0	2–1		2–0	1–3		1–0	3–0		0–1	0–2	2–3	0–1		1–4		0–1	1–2
Tilbury		1–1	0–1	1–0	2–1	1–2	5–3		1–0	1–1	2–0		3–0	5–0	3–3	1–2				1–1
Witham Town		1–2	1–0	0–3	1–1	1–2	1–7		1–1	3–1	1–0	0–1	0–2			0–5	1–1		0–2	

Updated to match(es) played on 11 March 2020. Source: North Division grid
Legend: Blue = home team win; Yellow = draw; Red = away team win.

=== Stadia and locations ===
Locations of North Division clubs

Club	Location	Stadium	Capacity
AFC Sudbury	Sudbury	King's Marsh	2,500
Aveley	Aveley	Parkside	3,500
Basildon United	Basildon	Gardiners Close	2,000
Brentwood Town	Brentwood	The Brentwood Centre Arena	1,800
Bury Town	Bury St Edmunds	Ram Meadow	3,500
Cambridge City	Cambridge	Bridge Road (groundshare with Histon)	2,000
Canvey Island	Canvey Island	Park Lane	4,500
Coggeshall Town	Coggeshall	West Street	2,000
Dereham Town	Dereham	Aldiss Park	3,000
Felixstowe & Walton United	Felixstowe	Dellwood Avenue	2,000
Grays Athletic	Grays	Parkside (groundshare with Aveley)	3,500
Great Wakering Rovers	Great Wakering	Burroughs Park	2,500
Heybridge Swifts	Heybridge	Scraley Road	3,000
Histon	Impington	Bridge Road	4,300
Hullbridge Sports	Hullbridge	Lower Road	1,500
Maldon & Tiptree	Maldon	Wallace Binder Ground	2,000
Romford	Romford	The Brentwood Centre Arena (groundshare with Brentwood Town)	3,500
Soham Town Rangers	Soham	Julius Martin Lane	2,000
Tilbury	Tilbury	Chadfields	4,000
Witham Town	Witham	Spa Road	2,500

== South Central Division ==
Isthmian League South Central Division
- Season: 2019–20
- Matches: 284
- Goals: 1,021 (3.6 per match)
- Top goalscorer: 23 goals - Jake Baxter (Chertsey Town)
- Highest attendance: 608 - Hertford Town 1–3 Ware
- Total attendance: 38,151
- Average attendance: 134 (+8.9% to previous season)

South Central Division consisted of 20 clubs, 16 clubs from the previous season, and four new clubs:

- Barking, transferred from the North Division
- Chertsey Town, promoted from the Combined Counties League
- Harlow Town, relegated from the Premier Division
- Staines Town, relegated from the Southern Football League Premier Division South

=== League table ===
Pos	Team	Pld	W	D	L	GF	GA	GD	Pts
1	Ware	30	19	7	4	81	44	+37	64
2	Hanwell Town	28	17	7	4	72	32	+40	58
3	Uxbridge	29	16	7	6	59	35	+24	55
4	Chertsey Town	28	15	7	6	74	40	+34	52
5	Westfield	28	15	7	6	65	32	+33	52
6	Bracknell Town	26	15	5	6	63	33	+30	50
7	Waltham Abbey	29	15	5	9	68	52	+16	50
8	Tooting & Mitcham United	27	14	5	8	53	29	+24	47
9	Barking	29	14	4	11	51	45	+6	46
10	Chipstead	28	13	6	9	53	40	+13	45
11	Marlow	28	11	10	7	39	30	+9	43
12	Bedfont Sports	29	10	9	10	42	44	−2	39
13	Chalfont St Peter	30	10	7	13	45	59	−14	37
14	Harlow Town	29	10	4	15	42	57	−15	34
15	South Park	26	6	9	11	37	52	−15	27
16	Hertford Town	29	6	4	19	39	81	−42	22
17	Ashford Town	29	5	5	19	30	70	−40	20
18	Northwood	29	6	2	21	34	81	−47	20
19	FC Romania	28	4	4	20	35	84	−49	16
20	Staines Town	29	2	8	19	39	81	−42	14

Updated to match(es) played on 10 March 2020. Source: Isthmian League Website
Rules for classification: 1) Points; 2) Goal difference; 3) Number of goals scored; 4) Number of matches won; 5) Head-to-head results

=== Results table ===
Home \ Away	ASH	BAR	BED	BRA	CHA	CHE	CHI	HAN	HAR	HER	MAR	NOR	ROM	SOU	STA	TOO	UXB	WAL	WAR	WES
Ashford Town		1–1	0–1	2–4	0–4	1–2	0–2		1–2			1–3		3–0	2–0		0–5	0–1	0–3	0–4
Barking			0–0	4–3	2–2	4–2		0–1		4–1		2–1	0–1	1–0	3–1	2–1	1–2	3–4		2–0
Bedfont Sports	0–0	0–0		0–2		1–0	1–1	0–4	1–0	1–0	1–2	4–1	3–2	2–2		2–0	1–3		1–3	1–2
Bracknell Town	4–0				1–0	0–0		1–1	5–1	2–0		2–0	4–2	4–0	7–1		2–0	1–1	1–6	1–2
Chalfont St Peter		2–1	2–1	2–2		2–1	3–2	1–2	2–3	1–1	1–3			1–2	3–2	1–4	0–2	0–0		1–1
Chertsey Town	4–0		3–3	2–1				1–1	3–0	6–1		8–2	7–0	3–0	6–3	0–5			1–1	2–2
Chipstead	0–2	1–2	1–0	2–0	1–1				4–2	6–0	1–1		2–1	0–0		1–2	0–2	3–2		
Hanwell Town	0–1	5–0			3–0		3–3		1–0	4–1	3–2		6–0	1–2	6–0	2–5		6–1	1–0	3–4
Harlow Town	1–1	2–3		0–3	0–1		3–2			2–1		1–2	4–3	1–1	1–0	1–1	0–1	4–3	3–4	2–0
Hertford Town	3–5	2–1	1–4		1–5	2–3	2–0	0–3	0–2		0–0		2–1	0–0	4–1	0–1	1–5		1–3	1–9
Marlow	1–1	3–1	1–1		1–1	2–4	1–2		1–1	1–0		1–0	2–1	2–1			0–2	0–0	2–3	3–0
Northwood	2–1		2–5	2–2	0–2	1–4	0–3	1–3		1–6	1–0			0–1	3–1	0–1	3–2	1–6	1–2	0–3
FC Romania	3–2	1–2		0–2	1–2	1–1	0–3	1–2			1–4	4–2		4–1	2–2	1–1		1–4	1–3	1–5
South Park	3–3	0–5		4–2			1–4	4–4				4–0			3–0		0–1	2–2	2–3	0–2
Staines Town			0–0	1–5	6–1	0–4	0–2	2–2	1–2	2–3	2–2	1–1				1–1	3–3	0–2		
Tooting & Mitcham United	3–1	2–1	3–0			1–2	1–4	0–1			0–0	2–1	6–0		1–2		1–2	3–0	2–1	
Uxbridge	3–2	2–1	3–3		3–0	2–2	2–2	0–0	2–1		0–2		6–0		2–1			0–1	0–2	2–2
Waltham Abbey		1–2	2–3		7–3	2–0		0–2	3–1	5–2	0–2	5–2	5–1		4–3	0–3	2–0			
Ware	6–0	4–2	3–2		2–1	2–0	6–1		4–1	3–3	0–0	4–1	1–1	3–3	3–3	2–1	2–2	2–3		
Westfield	5–0	0–1		0–2	4–0	0–3	2–0	2–2	3–1		2–0			1–1	3–0	1–1		2–2	4–0	

Updated to match(es) played on 11 March 2020. Source: South Central Division grid
Legend: Blue = home team win; Yellow = draw; Red = away team win.

=== Stadia and locations ===
Locations of South Central Division clubs
Greater London South Central Division clubs

Club	Location	Stadium	Capacity
Ashford Town	Ashford, Surrey	Robert Parker Stadium	2,550
Barking	Barking	Mayesbrook Park	2,500
Bedfont Sports	Bedfont	Bedfont Recreation Ground	3,000
Bracknell Town	Bracknell	Larges Lane	2,500
Chalfont St Peter	Chalfont St Peter	Mill Meadow	1,500
Chertsey Town	Chertsey	Alwyns Lane	2,500
Chipstead	Chipstead	High Road	2,000
FC Romania	Cheshunt	Cheshunt Stadium (groundshare with Cheshunt)	3,000
Hanwell Town	Perivale	Reynolds Field	3,000
Harlow Town	Harlow	The Harlow Arena	3,500
Hertford Town	Hertford	Hertingfordbury Park	6,500
Marlow	Marlow	Alfred Davis Memorial Ground	3,000
Northwood	Northwood	Northwood Park	3,075
South Park	Reigate	King George's Field	2,000
Staines Town	Staines-upon-Thames	Wheatsheaf Park	3,000
Tooting & Mitcham United	Mitcham	Imperial Fields	3,500
Uxbridge	West Drayton	Honeycroft	3,770
Waltham Abbey	Waltham Abbey	Capershotts	3,500
Ware	Ware	Wodson Park	3,300
Westfield	Woking (Westfield)	Woking Park	1,000

== South East Division ==
Isthmian League South East Division
- Season: 2019–20
- Matches: 282
- Goals: 876 (3.11 per match)
- Top goalscorer: 24 goals - Zak Ansah (Herne Bay)
- Highest attendance: 1,189 - Hastings United 0–3 Ashford United
- Total attendance: 67,144
- Average attendance: 238 (+15.0% to previous season)

South East Division consisted of 20 clubs, 16 clubs from the previous season, and four new clubs:

- Burgess Hill Town, relegated from the Premier Division
- Chichester City, promoted from the Southern Combination League
- Cray Valley Paper Mills, promoted from the Southern Counties East League
- Whitehawk, relegated from the Premier Division

=== League table ===
Pos	Team	Pld	W	D	L	GF	GA	GD	Pts	Relegation
1	Hastings United	28	18	8	2	53	21	+32	62	
2	Ashford United	30	19	2	9	75	41	+34	59	
3	Cray Valley Paper Mills	28	17	6	5	53	29	+24	57	
4	Whitehawk	28	16	8	4	61	33	+28	56	
5	Herne Bay	28	15	6	7	53	40	+13	51	
6	Chichester City	25	13	6	6	46	34	+12	45	
7	Whyteleafe	28	13	6	9	47	40	+7	45	
8	VCD Athletic	30	12	6	12	48	53	−5	42	
9	Phoenix Sports	27	13	2	12	46	40	+6	41	
10	Sevenoaks Town	29	11	8	10	43	37	+6	41	
11	Hythe Town	29	11	7	11	34	37	−3	40	
12	Haywards Heath Town	27	10	9	8	37	33	+4	39	
13	Guernsey	28	9	9	10	39	47	−8	36	Left the league for one season.
14	Whitstable Town	28	9	8	11	38	41	−3	35	
15	Burgess Hill Town	27	9	4	14	47	60	−13	31	
16	Sittingbourne	29	8	4	17	31	42	−11	28	
17	Faversham Town	30	7	7	16	30	51	−21	28	
18	Ramsgate	30	4	8	18	35	68	−33	20	
19	Three Bridges	29	5	3	21	35	68	−33	18	
20	East Grinstead Town	26	1	7	18	25	61	−36	10	

Updated to match(es) played on 10 March 2020. Source: Isthmian League website
Rules for classification: 1) Points; 2) Goal difference; 3) Number of goals scored; 4) Number of matches won; 5) Head-to-head results

=== Results table ===
Home \ Away	ASH	BUR	CHI	CRA	EAS	FAV	GUE	HAS	HAY	HER	HYT	PHO	RAM	SEV	SIT	THR	VCD	WHI	WHT	WHY
Ashford United		2–0	2–3	1–2	5–0	2–0	1–3	1–0	1–1				4–2	4–1	2–1	3–0	1–4	2–3		
Burgess Hill Town	0–7		1–2	2–3		3–1	3–0	1–3			7–2	0–3	2–2	2–3	2–1	4–2			3–2	
Chichester City	2–3	2–2			3–0	2–1	0–0				2–1			3–1	1–1	0–1	2–0		1–1	2–3
Cray Valley Paper Mills	3–1	1–0	0–2		3–1	2–0	1–1	0–0		1–2	1–1	2–0	5–3	1–0		1–0	5–0		4–3	3–2
East Grinstead Town	1–3	1–1				0–1	3–3	0–0	1–2				2–3		1–2	2–2	1–2	1–1	0–3	
Faversham Town		1–2	2–1	0–0	2–0		3–3			3–3	1–0	2–2	0–0	0–2	1–0	1–0	1–2	2–1	0–2	0–0
Guernsey	0–6		0–3					2–2	2–2	2–3	0–0	1–2		1–0	3–1		3–1	1–2	0–2	0–0
Hastings United	0–3		5–1		5–1	2–0			1–0	0–0	2–0	3–1	3–0	3–1	4–0		3–2	2–0	2–1	1–0
Haywards Heath Town	1–0	5–1		3–1		5–1	1–1	1–1		0–2	0–3	0–1	2–1	1–0	2–1	0–2		2–2		
Herne Bay	2–2	0–1	2–0	0–3	3–1		3–1		0–0		0–2	3–1	4–0	3–2	2–1	2–1	0–1		3–0	
Hythe Town	1–4		0–0		2–1	2–1	2–1		2–0	1–1				0–1	1–0		3–0	0–1	2–0	2–2
Phoenix Sports	1–2	3–2	2–3	2–0	6–3	2–1	1–2		1–0		2–0				3–0	0–3	1–2	0–2		
Ramsgate		2–4	1–2	0–2	2–0	3–0	1–4			0–3	0–2	1–1			1–2	0–2	0–1	2–2	1–1	3–1
Sevenoaks Town	3–0		2–2	1–1		3–1		2–2	1–2		0–0	1–0	3–1		1–2		2–1	1–1	4–0	0–2
Sittingbourne	0–1			1–3	2–2		0–1	0–1		2–0	1–0		7–0	0–3		1–0	2–1	1–1		0–1
Three Bridges	0–5	0–0	3–4		1–2		0–2	1–2	1–3	3–5	4–1	0–4	0–0	0–1				3–5	1–3	
VCD Athletic	3–1	4–0	0–3			2–1	0–1	0–0	2–2	2–4	2–2	2–3	2–2	2–2		4–3			1–0	2–1
Whitehawk		2–0		2–0	1–0	2–2		2–2	1–1	5–1	3–0	1–2	3–1		1–0	8–1	3–2		3–0	1–0
Whitstable Town	1–2	2–1		1–1	3–1			1–3	1–1	3–0		2–1	1–1	1–1	1–1	2–0	1–1			0–2
Whyteleafe	3–4	4–3		0–4	0–0	3–1	4–1	0–1	2–0	2–2	0–2	2–1	3–2	1–1	2–1	3–1		4–2		

Source: South East Division grid
Legend: Blue = home team win; Yellow = draw; Red = away team win.

=== Stadia and locations ===
Locations of South East Division clubs
Greater London Premier Division football clubs

Club	Location	Stadium	Capacity
Ashford United	Ashford, Kent	The Homelands	3,200
Burgess Hill Town	Burgess Hill	Leylands Park	2,500
Chichester City	Chichester	Oaklands Park	2,000
Cray Valley Paper Mills	Eltham	Badgers Sports Ground	1,000
East Grinstead Town	East Grinstead	East Court	1,500
Faversham Town	Faversham	Salters Lane	2,000
Guernsey	Saint Peter Port, Guernsey	Footes Lane	5,000
Hastings United	Hastings	The Pilot Field	4,050
Haywards Heath Town	Haywards Heath	Hanbury Park	2,000
Herne Bay	Herne Bay	Winch's Field	4,000
Hythe Town	Hythe	Reachfields Stadium	3,000
Phoenix Sports	Barnehurst	Victory Road	2,000
Ramsgate	Ramsgate	Southwood Stadium	2,500
Sevenoaks Town	Sevenoaks	Greatness Park	1,000
Sittingbourne	Sittingbourne	Woodstock Park	3,000
Three Bridges	Crawley (Three Bridges)	Jubilee Field	1,500
VCD Athletic	Crayford	Oakwood	1,400
Whitehawk	Brighton (Whitehawk)	The Enclosed Ground	3,126
Whitstable Town	Whitstable	The Belmont Ground	3,000
Whyteleafe	Whyteleafe	Church Road	2,000

== League Cup ==
2019–20 Alan Turvey Trophy
Tournament details
- Country: England
- Teams: 79

The 2019–20 Alan Turvey Trophy (formerly the Isthmian League Cup) is the 46th season of the Alan Turvey Trophy, the cup competition of the whole Isthmian League. It was the first season when group stage was introduced.

=== Calendar ===
Round	Dates	Matches	Clubs
Group stage	2 September to 28 January	13	79 → 32
First round	23 November to 4 February	32	32 → 16
Second round	7 January to 3 March	16	16 → 8
Quarterfinals	3 February to 10 March	4	8 → 4
Semifinals	_	2	4 → 2
Final	_	1	2 → 1

=== Group stage ===
57 clubs from the North Division, South East Division and South Central Division entered at this stage, while Guernsey, Whitehawk and Dereham Town decided not to participate.

==== Group 1 ====
Pos	Team	Pld	W	OTW	OTL	L	GF	GA	GD	Pts	Qualification	MAL (N)	BUR (N)	COG (N)	HEY (N)	SUD (N)	FEL (N)
1	Maldon & Tiptree (N)	5	4	0	1	0	23	6	+17	13	Qualified for knock-out stage	—	6–1	4–1		2–2 p.(7–8)	
2	Bury Town (N)	5	3	0	1	1	14	10	+4	10			—	3–0			5–1
3	Coggeshall Town (N)	5	2	1	0	2	10	10	0	8				—		5–1	2–2 p.(5–4)
4	Heybridge Swifts (N)	5	1	2	0	2	7	15	−8	7		1–8	2–2 p.(4–3)	0–2	—		
5	AFC Sudbury (N)	5	1	1	0	3	9	12	−3	5			1–3		1–2	—	4–0
6	Felixstowe & Walton United (N)	5	0	0	2	3	6	16	−10	2		1–3			2–2 p.(6–7)		—

Source: Isthmian League official

==== Group 2 ====
Pos	Team	Pld	W	OTW	OTL	L	GF	GA	GD	Pts	Qualification	BAR (SC)	AVE (N)	BRE (N)	ROM (N)	GRA (N)	WAL (SC)
1	Barking (SC)	5	4	0	1	0	11	1	+10	13	Qualified for knock-out stage	—		2–0	0–0 p.(3–4)	4–1	
2	Aveley (N)	5	3	0	0	2	10	8	+2	9		0–2	—		3–0	2–1	3–2
3	Brentwood Town (N)	5	3	0	0	2	9	9	0	9			3–2	—		3–1	
4	Romford (N)	5	2	1	0	2	6	7	−1	8				3–1	—		1–0
5	Grays Athletic (N)	5	2	0	0	3	9	12	−3	6					3–2	—	3–1
6	Waltham Abbey (SC)	5	0	0	0	5	4	12	−8	0		0–3		1–2			—

Source: Isthmian League official

==== Group 3 ====
Pos	Team	Pld	W	OTW	OTL	L	GF	GA	GD	Pts	Qualification	HIS (N)	WAR (SC)	CAM (N)	HAR (SC)	SOH (N)	HER (SC)
1	Histon (N)	5	2	2	1	0	13	6	+7	11	Qualified for knock-out stage	—	2–2 p.(4–2)			1–1 p.(3–1)	
2	Ware (SC)	5	3	0	2	0	19	9	+10	11			—	5–2	5–0		3–1
3	Cambridge City (N)	5	2	1	0	2	12	12	0	8		1–4		—	4–0	5–3	
4	Harlow Town (SC)	5	1	1	1	2	9	14	−5	6		2–2 p.(4–2)			—		6–2
5	Soham Town Rangers (N)	5	0	2	1	2	9	13	−4	5			4–4 p.(6–5)		1–1 p.(4–2)	—	0–2
6	Hertford Town (SC)	5	1	0	1	3	5	13	−8	4		0–4		0–0 p.(0–3)			—

Source: Isthmian League official

==== Group 4 ====
Pos	Team	Pld	W	OTW	OTL	L	GF	GA	GD	Pts	Qualification	BUR (SE)	HAS (SE)	HAY (SE)	THR (SE)	CHI (SE)	EAS (SE)
1	Burgess Hill Town (SE)	5	5	0	0	0	12	4	+8	15	Qualified for knock-out stage	—	2–1	2–0		3–0	
2	Hastings United (SE)	5	4	0	0	1	21	7	+14	12			—	1–0	5–2		12–3
3	Haywards Heath Town (SE)	5	2	0	1	2	5	4	+1	7				—	1–1 p.(4–5)	2–0	
4	Three Bridges (SE)	5	1	1	0	3	8	14	−6	5		1–2			—	2–6	2–0
5	Chichester City (SE)	5	1	0	0	4	6	14	−8	3			0–2			—	0–5
6	East Grinstead Town (SE)	5	1	0	0	4	10	19	−9	3		2–3		0–2			—

Source: Isthmian League official

==== Group 5 ====
Pos	Team	Pld	W	OTW	OTL	L	GF	GA	GD	Pts	Qualification	BRA (SC)	WES (SC)	HAN (SC)	MAR (SC)	CHA (SC)	ROM (SC)
1	Bracknell Town (SC)	5	5	0	0	0	13	3	+10	15	Qualified for knock-out stage	—		2–0	2–1	2–1	
2	Westfield (SC)	5	3	1	0	1	18	8	+10	11		1–3	—			5–3	8–0
3	Hanwell Town (SC)	5	2	0	2	1	8	6	+2	8			2–2 p.(3–4)	—	3–0		
4	Marlow (SC)	5	1	1	0	3	6	11	−5	5			0–2		—	3–2	2–2 p.(3–2)
5	Chalfont St Peter (SC)	5	1	1	0	3	11	13	−2	5				2–2 p.(17–16)		—	3–1
6	FC Romania (SC)	5	0	0	1	4	3	18	−15	1		0–4		0–1			—

Source: Isthmian League official

==== Group 6 ====
Pos	Team	Pld	W	OTW	OTL	L	GF	GA	GD	Pts	Qualification	BAS (N)	TIL (N)	GRE (N)	HUL (N)	CAN (N)	WIT (N)
1	Basildon United (N)	5	4	0	0	1	16	11	+5	12	Qualified for knock-out stage	—	0–3		2–1	5–3	
2	Tilbury (N)	5	3	0	0	2	13	9	+4	9			—	2–1		1–4	4–0
3	Great Wakering Rovers (N)	5	3	0	0	2	7	6	+1	9		0–4		—	1–0		
4	Hullbridge Sports (N)	5	2	1	0	2	7	7	0	8			4–3		—		2–1
5	Canvey Island (N)	5	2	0	1	2	12	8	+4	7				0–2	0–0 p.(3–5)	—	5–0
6	Witham Town (N)	5	0	0	0	5	5	19	−14	0		4–5		0–3			—

Source: Isthmian League official

==== Group 7 ====
Pos	Team	Pld	W	OTW	OTL	L	GF	GA	GD	Pts	Qualification	RAM (SE)	ASH (SE)	HER (SE)	WHI (SE)	FAV (SE)	HYT (SE)
1	Ramsgate (SE)	5	3	2	0	0	6	2	+4	13	Qualified for knock-out stage	—		1–0	2–0	2–2 p.(5–3)	
2	Ashford United (SE)	5	3	0	1	1	10	7	+3	10		0–0 p.(2–3)	—			4–2	2–1
3	Herne Bay (SE)	5	2	0	0	3	7	7	0	6			1–3	—			1–2
4	Whitstable Town (SE)	5	1	1	1	2	6	9	−3	6			3–1	1–4	—	0–0 p.(4–3)	
5	Faversham Town (SE)	5	1	0	2	2	11	8	+3	5				0–1		—	7–1
6	Hythe Town (SE)	5	1	1	0	3	6	13	−7	5		0–1			2–2 p.(6–5)		—

Source: Isthmian League official

==== Group 8 ====
Pos	Team	Pld	W	OTW	OTL	L	GF	GA	GD	Pts	Qualification	STA (SC)	NOR (SC)	UXB (SC)	BED (SC)	ASH (SC)
1	Staines Town (SC)	4	3	0	1	0	9	3	+6	10	Qualified for knock-out stage	—		0–0 p.(1–4)		2–0
2	Northwood (SC)	4	3	0	0	1	7	5	+2	9		2–3	—	1–0		
3	Uxbridge (SC)	4	1	1	0	2	2	5	−3	5				—	2–1	0–3
4	Bedfont Sports (SC)	4	1	0	0	3	6	9	−3	3		1–4	2–3		—	
5	Ashford Town (SC)	4	1	0	0	3	3	5	−2	3			0–1		0–2	—

Source: Isthmian League official

==== Group 9 ====
Pos	Team	Pld	W	OTW	OTL	L	GF	GA	GD	Pts	Qualification	SEV (SE)	SIT (SE)	PHO (SE)	VCD (SE)	CRA (SE)
1	Sevenoaks Town (SE)	4	2	2	0	0	8	4	+4	10	Qualified for knock-out stage	—	2–2 p.(4–2)		2–2 p.(4–3)	
2	Sittingbourne (SE)	4	2	1	1	0	13	10	+3	9			—		4–4 p.(5–4)	3–2
3	Phoenix Sports (SE)	4	1	1	0	2	5	9	−4	5		0–3	2–4	—		
4	VCD Athletic (SE)	4	0	0	4	0	9	9	0	4				1–1 p.(3–4)	—	2–2 p.(6–7)
5	Cray Valley PM (SE)	4	0	1	0	3	5	8	−3	2		0–1		1–2		—

Source: Isthmian League official

==== Group 10 ====
Pos	Team	Pld	W	OTW	OTL	L	GF	GA	GD	Pts	Qualification	WHY (SE)	CHE (SC)	CHI (SC)	SOU (SC)	TOT (SC)
1	Whyteleafe (SE)	4	2	1	0	1	5	4	+1	8	Qualified for knock-out stage	—	0–1	1–1 p.(5–4)		
2	Chertsey Town (SC)	4	2	0	1	1	8	6	+2	7			—	2–3	2–2 p.(3–4)	
3	Chipstead (SC)	4	1	1	1	1	7	7	0	6				—	2–3	1–1 p.(5–4)
4	South Park (SC)	4	1	1	0	2	7	8	−1	5		1–2			—	1–2
5	Tooting & Mitcham United (SC)	4	1	0	1	2	5	7	−2	4		1–2	1–3			—

Source: Isthmian League official

=== First round ===
Ten group winners were entered into the draw with twenty-two clubs from the Premier Division, making thirty-two clubs.

Tie	Home team (tier)	Score	Away team (tier)	Att.
136	Wingate & Finchley (P)	2–0	Bowers & Pitsea (P)	89
137	Ramsgate (SE)	2–3	Leatherhead (P)	86
138	East Thurrock United (P)	3–4	Bishop's Stortford (P)	75
Bishop's Stortford excluded, East Thurrock United reinstalled
139	Brightlingsea Regent (P)	1–0	Histon (N)	72
140	Potters Bar Town (P)	2–4	Basildon United (N)	44
141	Kingstonian (P)	2–3	Merstham (P)	102
142	Lewes (P)	2–0	Sevenoaks Town (SE)	102
143	Horsham (P)	1–0	Whyteleafe (SE)	175

Tie	Home team (tier)	Score	Away team (tier)	Att.
144	Bracknell Town (SC)	2–0	Hornchurch (P)	105
145	Worthing (P)	3–2	Cray Wanderers (P)	380
146	Haringey Borough (P)	2–3	Maldon & Tiptree (N)	97
147	Barking (SC)	1–2	Cheshunt (P)	62
148	Enfield Town (P)	5–1	Staines Town (SC)	120
149	Margate (P)	5–1	Carshalton Athletic (P)	103
150	Folkestone Invicta (P)	4–3	Bognor Regis Town (P)	163
151	Corinthian-Casuals (P)	1–2	Burgess Hill Town (SE)	114

=== Second round ===
Tie	Home team (tier)	Score	Away team (tier)	Att.
152	Bracknell Town (SC)	2–1	Lewes (P)	114
153	Wingate & Finchley (P)	1–3	Margate (P)	44
154	East Thurrock United (P)	2–2	Cheshunt (P)	95
Cheshunt advance 4–3 on penalties
155	Enfield Town (P)	1–2	Brightlingsea Regent (P)	135

Tie	Home team (tier)	Score	Away team (tier)	Att.
156	Worthing (P)	2–0	Leatherhead (P)	291
157	Maldon & Tiptree (N)	0–0	Merstham (P)	74
Maldon & Tiptree advance 5–4 on penalties
158	Horsham (P)	5–0	Burgess Hill Town (SE)	230
159	Basildon United (N)	2–2	Folkestone Invicta (P)	81
Folkestone Invicta advance 5–4 on penalties

=== Quarter-finals ===
Tie	Home team (tier)	Score	Away team (tier)	Att.
160	Bracknell Town (SC)	0–0	Maldon & Tiptree (N)	103
Bracknell Town advance 4–1 on penalties
161	Worthing (P)	1–3	Cheshunt (P)	235

Tie	Home team (tier)	Score	Away team (tier)	Att.
162	Horsham (P)	1–0	Margate (P)	195
163	Folkestone Invicta (P)	2–2	Brightlingsea Regent (P)	184
Folkestone Invicta advance 4–3 on penalties

=== Semi-finals ===
Tie	Home team (tier)	Score	Away team (tier)	Att.
164	Folkestone Invicta (P)	–	Bracknell Town (SC)	
165	Horsham (P)	–	Cheshunt (P)	

Semifinals were scheduled for 17 March, but were never played as the season was stopped and finally abandoned on 26 March due to COVID-19 pandemic.

== See also ==
- 2019–20 Northern Premier League
- 2019–20 Southern Football League
