= 1980–81 Sussex County Football League =

The 1980–81 Sussex County Football League season was the 56th in the history of Sussex County Football League a football competition in England.

== Division One ==
Sussex County Football League Division One
- Season: 1980–81
- Champions: Pagham
- Relegated: Portfield; Bexhill Town
- Matches: 240
- Goals: 684 (2.85 per match)

Division One featured 14 clubs which competed in the division last season, along with two new clubs, promoted from Division Two:

- Hastings Town
- Three Bridges

=== League table ===
Pos	Team	Pld	W	D	L	GF	GA	GR	Pts	Qualification or relegation
1	Pagham	30	18	9	3	52	22	2.364	45	
2	Peacehaven & Telscombe	30	16	10	4	53	28	1.893	42	
3	Steyning Town	30	15	10	5	61	37	1.649	40	
4	Hastings Town	30	14	8	8	64	35	1.829	36	
5	Southwick	30	10	13	7	42	35	1.200	33	
6	Burgess Hill Town	30	9	14	7	37	29	1.276	32	
7	Three Bridges	30	12	7	11	44	39	1.128	31	
8	Arundel	30	11	7	12	34	27	1.259	29	
9	Shoreham	30	9	10	11	40	50	0.800	28	
10	Chichester City	30	8	11	11	47	47	1.000	27	
11	Littlehampton Town	30	10	7	13	42	43	0.977	27	
12	Ringmer	30	9	9	12	45	54	0.833	27	
13	Eastbourne Town	30	10	6	14	36	41	0.878	26	
14	Horsham YMCA	30	8	9	13	35	55	0.636	25	
15	Portfield	30	5	9	16	29	68	0.426	19	Relegated to Division Two
16	Bexhill Town	30	5	3	22	23	74	0.311	13	Relegated to Division Two

Source: nonleaguematters
Rules for classification: 1) points; 2) goal ratio.

== Division Two ==
Sussex County Football League Division Two
- Season: 1980–81
- Champions: Whitehawk
- Promoted: Whitehawk; Hailsham Town
- Matches: 182
- Goals: 547 (3.01 per match)

Division Two featured twelve clubs which competed in the division last season, along with two new clubs relegated from Division One:

- Haywards Heath
- Rye United

=== League table ===
Pos	Team	Pld	W	D	L	GF	GA	GR	Pts	Qualification or relegation
1	Whitehawk	26	19	3	4	57	22	2.591	41	Promoted to Division One
2	Hailsham Town	26	17	5	4	56	21	2.667	39	Promoted to Division One
3	Wick	26	17	3	6	69	32	2.156	37	
4	Haywards Heath	26	11	7	8	40	28	1.429	29	
5	East Grinstead	26	11	7	8	34	35	0.971	29	
6	Wigmore Athletic	26	8	9	9	47	47	1.000	25	
7	Sidley United	26	9	6	11	33	30	1.100	24	
8	Storrington	26	10	4	12	31	36	0.861	24	
9	Newhaven	26	9	4	13	44	56	0.786	22	
10	Lancing	26	8	6	12	28	48	0.583	22	
11	Rye United	26	6	9	11	26	37	0.703	21	
12	Crowborough Athletic	26	8	4	14	35	50	0.700	20	
13	Selsey	26	5	6	15	22	41	0.537	16	
14	Albion United	26	5	5	16	25	64	0.391	15	

Source: nonleaguematters
Rules for classification: 1) points; 2) goal ratio.
