= 1950–51 Sussex County Football League =

Sussex County Football League
- Season: 1950–51
- Champions: Haywards Heath
- Matches played: 182
- Goals scored: 763 (4.19 per match)

The 1950–51 Sussex County Football League season was the 26th in the history of the competition.

== League table ==
The league featured 14 clubs which competed in the last season, no new clubs joined the league this season.

=== League table ===
Pos	Team	Pld	W	D	L	GF	GA	GR	Pts	Qualification or relegation
1	Haywards Heath	26	19	4	3	75	25	3.000	42	
2	Chichester City	26	17	6	3	65	26	2.500	40	
3	Horsham	26	16	4	6	83	38	2.184	36	Joined Metropolitan League
4	Newhaven	26	15	5	6	83	58	1.431	35	
5	Arundel	26	13	7	6	48	35	1.371	33	
6	East Grinstead	26	13	2	11	60	74	0.811	28	
7	Shoreham	26	12	2	12	60	60	1.000	26	
8	Lancing Athletic	26	11	2	13	49	54	0.907	24	
9	Eastbourne Comrades	26	9	5	12	48	51	0.941	23	
10	Southwick	26	8	5	13	50	52	0.962	21	
11	Bexhill Town Athletic	26	8	5	13	29	47	0.617	21	
12	Bognor Regis Town	26	8	2	16	50	73	0.685	18	
13	Lewes	26	3	3	20	38	89	0.427	9	
14	Littlehampton Town	26	3	2	21	25	81	0.309	8	

Source: Non-League Matters
Rules for classification: 1) points; 2) goal difference; 3) number of goals scored.
The points system until the 1982–83 season: 2 points for a win, 1 point for a draw and 0 points for losing.
