= 1949–50 Sussex County Football League =

Sussex County Football League
- Season: 1949–50
- Champions: Haywards Heath
- Matches played: 182
- Goals scored: 863 (4.74 per match)

The 1949–50 Sussex County Football League season was the 25th in the history of the competition.

== League table ==
The league featured 14 clubs, 13 which competed in the last season, along with one new club:

- Arundel

Bognor Regis added Town to the club name.

=== League table ===
Pos	Team	Pld	W	D	L	GF	GA	GR	Pts
1	Haywards Heath	26	18	3	5	75	36	2.083	39
2	Lancing Athletic	26	16	7	3	75	38	1.974	39
3	Horsham	26	14	5	7	71	51	1.392	33
4	Bexhill Town Athletic	26	12	9	5	56	46	1.217	33
5	Southwick	26	9	8	9	56	47	1.191	26
6	East Grinstead	26	11	4	11	71	67	1.060	26
7	Chichester City	26	11	3	12	74	62	1.194	25
8	Littlehampton Town	26	8	9	9	50	61	0.820	25
9	Bognor Regis Town	26	11	2	13	86	80	1.075	24
10	Shoreham	26	10	4	12	58	65	0.892	24
11	Newhaven	26	6	6	14	48	72	0.667	18
12	Arundel	26	8	2	16	50	86	0.581	18
13	Eastbourne Comrades	26	6	5	15	42	65	0.646	17
14	Lewes	26	7	3	16	51	87	0.586	17

Source: Non-League Matters
Rules for classification: 1) points; 2) goal difference; 3) number of goals scored.
The points system until the 1982–83 season: 2 points for a win, 1 point for a draw and 0 points for losing.
