= Arundel F.C. =

Association football club in England

Coordinates: 50°51′18.652″N 0°32′58.279″W

Arundel
- Full name: Arundel Football Club
- Nickname: The Mullets
- Founded: 1889
- Ground: Mill Road, Arundel
- Capacity: 2,200 (100 seated)
- Chairman: Dan Harvey
- Manager: Joss Parsons
- League: Southern Combination Division One
- 2025–26: Southern Combination Division One, 7th of 18
| Home colours | Away colours |

Arundel Football Club is a football club based in Arundel, West Sussex, England. They are currently members of the Southern Combination Division One and play at Mill Road.

== History ==
The club was established in 1889. They were founder members of the West Sussex League in 1896 and were placed in the Senior Division. They remained in the league until joining the Sussex County League in 1949. When the league gained a second division in 1952, they were placed in Division One. In 1957–58 they won Division One, and retained the title the following season.

In 1965–66 Arundel finished second-from-bottom of Division One and were relegated to Division Two. However, they made an immediate return to Division One as Division Two runners-up the following season, and went on to finish as Division One runners-up in 1968–69. This was repeated in the mid-1970s, when relegation in 1975–76 was followed by promotion in 1976–77, a season in which the club also won the Division Two Cup. Another relegation in 1982–83 resulted in another immediate return to Division One as Division Two runners up in 1983–84, with the club going on to win their third title in 1986–87, also claiming the league's Challenge Cup. In 1997–98 they finished bottom of Division One and were relegated to Division Two. Two seasons later they finished as runners-up in Division Two to earn promotion back to Division One.

In 2003–04 Arundel won the Challenge Cup, and in 2008–09 finished as Division One runners-up. In 2015 the league was renamed the Southern Combination, with Division One becoming the Premier Division. The 2018–19 season saw Arundel finish second-from-bottom of the Premier Division, resulting in relegation to Division One.

=== Season-by-season record ===
| Season | Division | Position | Significant events |
|---|---|---|---|
| 1949–50 | Sussex County League | 12/14 | |
| 1950–51 | Sussex County League | 5/14 | |
| 1951–52 | Sussex County League | 11/15 | |
| 1952–53 | Sussex County League Division One | 4/14 | |
| 1953–54 | Sussex County League Division One | 8/15 | |
| 1954–55 | Sussex County League Division One | 15/17 | |
| 1955–56 | Sussex County League Division One | 6/17 | |
| 1956–57 | Sussex County League Division One | 3/16 | |
| 1957–58 | Sussex County League Division One | 1/16 | Champions |
| 1958–59 | Sussex County League Division One | 1/16 | Champions |
| 1959–60 | Sussex County League Division One | 9/16 | |
| 1960–61 | Sussex County League Division One | 5/16 | |
| 1961–62 | Sussex County League Division One | 9/17 | |
| 1961–62 | League abandoned | | |
| 1963–64 | Sussex County League Division One | 15/17 | |
| 1964–65 | Sussex County League Division One | 14/17 | |
| 1965–66 | Sussex County League Division One | 15/16 | Relegated |
| 1966–67 | Sussex County League Division Two | 2/17 | Promoted |
| 1967–68 | Sussex County League Division One | 10/16 | |
| 1968–69 | Sussex County League Division One | 2/16 | |
| 1969–70 | Sussex County League Division One | 13/16 | |
| 1970–71 | Sussex County League Division One | 6/16 | |
| 1971–72 | Sussex County League Division One | 5/16 | |
| 1972–73 | Sussex County League Division One | 12/15 | |
| 1973–74 | Sussex County League Division One | 10/15 | |
| 1974–75 | Sussex County League Division One | 8/15 | |
| 1975–76 | Sussex County League Division One | 14/15 | Relegated |
| 1976–77 | Sussex County League Division Two | 2/14 | Promoted, Division Two Cup winners |
| 1977–78 | Sussex County League Division One | 9/16 | |
| 1978–79 | Sussex County League Division One | 7/16 | |
| 1979–80 | Sussex County League Division One | 11/16 | |
| 1980–81 | Sussex County League Division One | 8/16 | |
| 1981–82 | Sussex County League Division One | 7/16 | |
| 1982–83 | Sussex County League Division One | 15/16 | Relegated |
| 1983–84 | Sussex County League Division Two | 2/16 | Promoted |
| 1984–85 | Sussex County League Division One | 5/16 | |
| 1985–86 | Sussex County League Division One | 9/16 | |
| 1986–87 | Sussex County League Division One | 1/16 | Champions, Challenge Cup winners |
| 1987–88 | Sussex County League Division One | 12/16 | |
| 1988–89 | Sussex County League Division One | 16/18 | |
| 1989–90 | Sussex County League Division One | 16/18 | |
| 1990–91 | Sussex County League Division One | 8/18 | |
| 1991–92 | Sussex County League Division One | 11/18 | |
| 1992–93 | Sussex County League Division One | 12/18 | |
| 1993–94 | Sussex County League Division One | 10/20 | |
| 1994–95 | Sussex County League Division One | 17/20 | |
| 1995–96 | Sussex County League Division One | 7/20 | |
| 1996–97 | Sussex County League Division One | 12/20 | |
| 1997–98 | Sussex County League Division One | 20/20 | Relegated |
| 1998–99 | Sussex County League Division Two | 8/18 | |
| 1999–00 | Sussex County League Division Two | 2/18 | Promoted |
| 2000–01 | Sussex County League Division One | 13/20 | |
| 2001–02 | Sussex County League Division One | 9/20 | |
| 2002–03 | Sussex County League Division One | 17/20 | |
| 2003–04 | Sussex County League Division One | 6/19 | Challenge Cup winners |
| 2004–05 | Sussex County League Division One | 9/20 | |
| 2005–06 | Sussex County League Division One | 7/20 | |
| 2006–07 | Sussex County League Division One | 3/20 | |
| 2007–08 | Sussex County League Division One | 3/20 | |
| 2008–09 | Sussex County League Division One | 2/20 | |
| 2009–10 | Sussex County League Division One | 12/20 | |
| 2010–11 | Sussex County League Division One | 9/20 | |
| 2011–12 | Sussex County League Division One | 17/20 | |
| 2012–13 | Sussex County League Division One | 14/22 | |
| 2013–14 | Sussex County League Division One | 12/20 | |
| 2014–15 | Sussex County League Division One | 10/20 | |
| 2015–16 | Southern Combination Premier Division | 12/20 | |
| 2016–17 | Southern Combination Premier Division | 15/20 | |
| 2017–18 | Southern Combination Premier Division | 17/20 | |
| 2018–19 | Southern Combination Premier Division | 19/20 | Relegated |
| 2019-20 | Southern Combination Division 1 | – | Season abandoned due to COVID-19 pandemic |
| 2020-21 | Southern Combination Division 1 | – | Season abandoned due to COVID-19 pandemic |
| 2021-22 | Southern Combination Division 1 | 17/18 | |
| 2022-23 | Southern Combination Division 1 | 7/17 | |
| 2023-24 | Southern Combination Division 1 | 8/18 | |
Source: Football Club History Database

== Ground ==
The club play their home games at Mill Road in Arundel. The ground has a capacity of 2,200, of which 100 is seated and 200 covered.

== Honours ==
- Southern Combination
  - Division One champions 1957–58, 1958–59, 1986–87
  - Challenge Cup winners 1986–87, 2003–04
  - Division Two Cup winners 1976–77
- Sussex RUR Cup
  - Winners 1968–69, 1972–73, 1978–79, 1979–80

== Records ==
- Best FA Cup performance: Second qualifying round, 1958–59, 1959–60, 1960–61, 1971–72 (second replay), 1972–73, 1986–87
- Best FA Vase performance: Fourth round, 2002–03
- Record attendance: 2,200 vs Chichester City, Sussex County League, 1967–68

== See also ==
- Arundel F.C. players
