= East Grinstead Town F.C. =

Association football club in England

Coordinates: 51°7′52.820″N 0°0′7.380″E

East Grinstead Town
- Full name: East Grinstead Town Football Club
- Nickname: The Wasps
- Founded: 8 May 1890
- Ground: East Court, East Grinstead
- Capacity: 3,000
- Chairman: Richard Tramontin
- Manager: Andy Willis
- League: Southern Combination Premier Division
- 2025–26: Isthmian League South East Division, 22nd of 22 (relegated)
- Website: egtfc.co.uk
Home colours

East Grinstead Town Football Club is a football club based in East Grinstead, West Sussex, England. They are currently members of the Southern Combination Premier Division and play at East Court.

== History ==
The club was established on 8 May 1890 as East Grinstead, but did not play their first competitive match until 1900, when they were founder members of the Mid-Sussex League. They won the league in 1901–02 on goal average and were runners-up in 1904–05. The club were joint winners of the Sussex Junior Cup with Arundel in 1908–09, and went on to finish as runners-up in the Mid-Sussex League again in 1910–11 and 1911–12. In 1920 they were founder members of the Sussex County League, and finished bottom of the table in its first season. After finishing eleventh out of twelve the following season, they left the league. They returned in 1924, but after finishing bottom of the table again in both 1924–25 and 1925–26, they left again after failing to be re-elected and dropped into Division One of the Brighton, Hove & District League. The club were Division One runners-up in 1927–28, after which they joined Division Three of the Southern Amateur League.

East Grinstead were Division Three champions in 1931–32, earning promotion to Division Two. However, they finished bottom of Division Two in 1933–34, and after being relegated to Division Three, they finished bottom of Division Three in 1934–35. They then returned to the Mid-Sussex, and after winning it in 1936–37, returned to the Sussex County League for a third spell. In the first season after World War II they were placed in the Eastern Division and finished the season as runners-up. The league reverted to a single division the following season, and after a second division was added in 1952, the club remained in Division One until the end of the 1978–79 season, when they were relegated to Division Two. During this period they won the league's Baldwin Cup in 1951–52. In 1988–89 they finished bottom of the division and were relegated to Division Three. However, after finishing third in Division Three 1990–91 they were promoted to back Division Two, and two seasons later they finished third in Division Two, earning promotion to Division One.

After finishing bottom of Division One in 1994–95, East Grinstead were relegated back to Division Two. In 1997 they were renamed East Grinstead Town. The club were promoted back to Division One after finishing third in 2002–03, and won the Sussex RUR Cup in 2003–04, beating Three Bridges 4–0 in the final. However, they were relegated back to Division Two the following season. In 2007–08 they won Division Two, and were promoted back to Division One. After finishing as Division One runners-up in 2013–14, they were promoted to Division One South of the Isthmian League. Amid league reorganisation, the club were placed in the South East Division in 2018. In 2019–20 they were bottom of the table with only ten points in early March and at risk of relegation. However, the season was abandoned due to the coronavirus pandemic and all promotion and relegation was cancelled. In 2025–26 the club finished bottom of the South East Division and were relegated to the Premier Division of the Southern Combination (as the Sussex County League had been renamed).

== Ground ==
Until 1962 the club played at West Street, which was shared with the local cricket club. They were forced to leave the ground, having been given notice in 1958, and temporarily played at King George's Field before moving to East Court in 1967.

A large bank was created on one side of the pitch, with a covered terrace located in the centre. Floodlights were installed in 1997, with two new stands built in 2008.

== Honours ==
- Sussex County League
  - Division Two champions 2007–08
  - Baldwin Cup winners 1951–52
- Mid-Sussex League
  - Champions 1901–02, 1936–37
  - Montgomery Cup winners 1911–12, 1912–13
- Southern Amateur League
  - Division Three champions 1931–32
- Sussex RUR Cup
  - Winners 2003–04

== Records ==
- Best FA Cup performance: Second qualifying round, 1947–48, 1950–51, 1952–53, 1971–72, 2018–19, 2020–21
- Best FA Trophy performance: Second qualifying round, 2025–26
- Best FA Vase performance: Third round, 1974–75
- Record attendance: 2,006 vs Lancing, FA Amateur Cup, November, 1947
- Most appearances: Guy Hill

== See also ==
- East Grinstead Town F.C. players
- East Grinstead Town F.C. managers
