= Burgess Hill Town F.C. =

Burgess Hill Town
- Full name: Burgess Hill Town Football Club
- Nicknames: The Hillians, Hill
- Founded: 1882 (as Burgess Hill)
- Ground: Leylands Park, Burgess Hill
- Capacity: 2,500 (408 seated)
- Coordinates: 50°58′2″N 0°7′27″W
- Chairman: David Corney and Vicky Gaffney
- Manager: Gary Mansell
- League: Isthmian League Premier Division
- 2025–26: Isthmian League Premier Division, 8th of 22
- Website: https://bhtfc.co.uk
Home colours	Away colours	Third colours

Burgess Hill Town Football Club is an English football club currently playing in the Isthmian League Premier Division. The club plays its home games at Leylands Park, known for sponsorship reasons as the Medical Travel Compared Stadium, in Burgess Hill, West Sussex.

== History ==
Burgess Hill Football Club was founded in 1882 and was a founder member of the Sussex County Football Association. The club attained the unique achievement of winning the Sussex Senior Cup three years running thus retaining it permanently in the process. The cup is on display in the trophy cabinet in the club boardroom. The current trophy was presented to the S.C.F.A. by Burgess Hill Town Football Club. In the club's formative years they were also founder members of the Mid-Sussex Football League, and won the League Championship in its inaugural season.

Following several successful seasons the club joined the Sussex County League for the 1958–59 season, and stayed until attaining promotion to the Southern Football League in 2003. In 1969 the club amalgamated with Worlds End F.C., changed name to Burgess Hill Town and with the help of Burgess Hill Town Council were able to move to Leylands Park, the club's current home. In 1971, the club gained promotion to Division One, only to be relegated two seasons later. 1974 saw the 'Hillians' reach another landmark achievement by becoming the only club ever to have won both the League Challenge Cup and the Division Two Cup in the same season. In 1976 a hat trick of achievements were completed by winning the Division One Championship by six points, having secured the Division Two title the previous season.

During the ensuing twenty years in the top flight of the County League success was modest. In 1980 the League Challenge Cup was secured and in 1992 the RUR Cup was added. However, all this changed in season 1996–97 under the guidance of club manager, Alan Pook. The club became Division One champions by twelve points, won the Floodlight Cup, and were runners up in the League Challenge Cup. The 2nd XI finished runners up in the Reserve Premier and won the Mid-Sussex Charity Cup, while the Youth XI won their overall championship. In 1997–98, the club 1st XI attained even more success by again winning the League Championship and the League Challenge Cup, also reaching the last sixteen in the F.A. Vase. Additionally they reached the Sussex Senior Cup Final and were top of the county's merit table. The Youth XI also finished as 'Double Champions' in the sector.

The 1998–99 season saw the Hillians achieve a unique treble in winning the Championship for a post war record third time and again securing a league and cup double, back to back. The 2nd XI won their cup and were runners up in the league, missing out by a single point. Not to be out done, the Youth XI won their league and only missed out on a double by goal difference.

The club then appointed new manager Gary Croydon for season 1999–2000. He led the Hillians to take runners' up spot in the league and to a record fourth qualifying round FA Cup tie against Hereford United. Again a last 16 place was achieved in the FA Vase as well as winning the RUR Cup and the Floodlit Cup.

The new millennium season saw Hillians take the league championship with the team remaining unbeaten in the league until April; the club also had its best ever run in the FA Vase only being beaten after extra time by eventual finalists Tiptree United in the last eight, before a club record attendance of 1598. With plans being laid for Southern League football, club directors, Gary Croydon and Eddie Benson appointed Danny Bloor as manager for season 2002–2003. The club was rewarded with yet another championship crown, the fifth in seven seasons.

Gary Croydon took over the Hillians again as the club entered the Southern League for the first ever time. After just missing out on the play-offs, Burgess Hill Town moved over to the Isthmian League due to the restructuring of the non-league pyramid. After the first season in the Isthmian League manager Gary Croydon stepped down and was replaced by Steve Johnson in May 2005. But six months later with the Hillians bottom of the League, Croydon took over again with assistance from Jim Thompson and Peter Miles as the club avoided relegation.

For the 2007–08 season, the club appointed former professional player Jamie Howell as first team manager. He was sacked on 4 March 2009. In May 2009 Gary Croydon announced his appointment as first team manager once again for the 2009–10 season.

At the start of the 2011–12 season, manager Gary Croydon stepped down as to concentrate more on his chief executive role as the club look for a new ground on the outskirts of the town near the Triangle Leisure Centre.

Taking over the manager role was Simon Rowland who had guided AFC Uckfield to the Sussex County League Division 2 title the previous season. He was assisted by former Brighton & Hove Albion youth coach Ben White. The pair were sacked after a 7–0 defeat at Godalming and John Rattle was put in charge for the final seven league fixtures. Relegation was avoided on the last day of the season by defeating Dulwich Hamlet.

Former Brighton & Hove Albion defender Ian Chapman was appointed manager around 2012. He steered the club to promotion from the 8th tier in the 2014–15 season as his side obtained 109 points. The Hillians played in the 7th tier of English football, their highest ever standings until they were relegated at the end of the 2018–19 season. The team reached the Sussex Senior Challenge Cup final in the 2018–19 season, guided by former Lewes coach Simon Wormull, who had replaced Chapman after a defeat away to Bognor Regis Town. Bognor also defeated the Hillians in the Sussex Senior Cup final Ross Murdoch scored the only goal for Hill in a 2–1 defeat after extra time.

Back in the 8th tier the Hillians started off the 2019–20 campaign by beating league favourites Hythe Town 7–2 at Leylands Park, but after a run of poor form Wormull was sacked and former Brentford defender Jay Lovett was named as his successor.

During the 2022–23 season Burgess Hill fought a long relegation battle, avoiding the relegation play-off spots on the final day of the season with a 0–0 draw at home with Beckenham Town along with the right combination of other results. During the season, Hill sacked manager Jay Lovett (who within days moved to Haywards Heath Town) whilst in a poor position and replaced him with travelled manager Matt Longhurst, who resigned after a handful of games in March 2023 following a 4–1 win over Corinthian due to "logistical circumstances". Longhurst enjoyed popularity during his short tenure at the club having some good results and being recognised by his fashion on the sideline. For the remainder of the season, The Hillians were under player-manager Lewis Taylor, the midfielder led Burgess Hill to retaining their place in the 8th tier. During this season, Burgess Hill Town also changed ownership, seeing Vince Alfieri, who had founded Burgess Hill Town Juniors, taking over as owner and chairman from Kevin Newell. In late 2023, Alfieri then brought in Vicky Gaffney and David Corney as co-owners. In February 2025, Corney / Gaffney completed the purchase of the remaining shares of the club from Alfieri to become full owners. Dave Bradbury, Operations Director and long time fan of the club, and Gary Mansell, Director of Football were added to the clubs Board in May 2025.

During the break before the 2023–24 season, Burgess Hill announced the appointment of former Brighton & Hove Albion player Dean Cox as manager. Taylor voiced his disappointment but understanding online at not being appointed permanently. Cox would then be replaced by Gary Mansell as manager following a shock exit on 6 December 2023 which also led to an exodus of players and The Hill frequently fielding very young squads for the remainder of the season. Lovett would later return as co-manager. The 2024–25 season saw the club promoted to step three through the play-offs, defeating Sittingbourne on penalties in the final.

In May 2025, the club were granted permission to replace its grass pitch with a 3G playing surface. The 3G pitch was completed in time for Burgess Hill’s home game with Folkestone Invicta on 20 September 2025.

On the 2nd of April 2026, Burgess Hill Town FC released a statement on their website announcing the departure of Joint First Team Manager Jay Lovett, stating that "it became apparent that the current co-manager arrangement was not going to be the right set-up for us as a club long term" and that they would be reverting to a single-manager structure, with Gary Mansell taking over as the sole First Team Manager.

== Ground ==
Burgess Hill Town play their home games at Leylands Park, Maple Drive, Burgess Hill, Sussex, RH15 8DL. For sponsorship reasons, the stadium is currently known as the Medical Travel Compared Stadium and has recently been known as the Homecall Carpets Community Stadium, the More Than Tyres Stadium and the Green Elephant Stadium.

Burgess Hill consistently have one of the largest home supports in their league. Even during the poor 2022/23 season, the average home league attendance (often even higher for cup games) was 443, the fourth highest in the league of 20. The Hillians also have one of the loudest home supports in the league, backed by a committed group often seen on the Ashley Carr Terrace

The ground features 3 stands (The Mansell McTaggart Stand, The Ashley Carr Terrace (standing only) and the Main Stand) holding 408 seated, with the maximum capacity being 2500. There are also various food stands, including an outdoor Bar, and The Back of The Net foot stand, many games also have further food options present. Fans can visit the Hillians' Bar, attached to the Mansell McTaggart Stand.

In the 2025–26 pre-season, Burgess Hill Town FC announced that they would be converting the grass pitch to a 3G pitch, as well as new perimeter fencing, floodlights, and acoustic sound barrier. The 3G pitch work was completed in September 2025.

== Reserves and youth ==
The team have a youth team which currently plays in the Isthmian Youth South. The youth team won the Sussex County Cup in the 2010–11 season. Until the 2011–12 season the club also ran a reserve team but they disbanded due to financial problems at the club. Both teams, like the first team, play at Leylands Park. In the 2014–15 season the youth team was managed by Ian South and Paul Armstrong with the u21s run by Neil Wheeler and Peter Miles.

== Rivalries ==
=== The Mid-Sussex Derby ===
Burgess Hill have a minor rivalry with nearby Hayward's Heath Town.

=== The Ann John Trophy ===
The Ann John Memorial Trophy is an annual friendly trophy held between Burgess Hill and Hassocks. The match raises funds for the St Peter and St James Hospice (most recently raising £2830 in 2025, breaking the 2024 record of £2221) and is hosted at Hassock's The Beacon. It is named in memory of Ann John, the wife of Hassock's chairman Dave John. It has been held every year since 2014. If the match ends in a draw, the trophy is shared between the two sides, Burgess Hill are the current record champions. The match has had particular significance due to Pat Harding, regarded as a legend by both teams, he played first for Hassocks, then for Hill (scoring over 100 goals), before returning to Hassocks.

In 2024, Hassocks beat Burgess Hill to become the sole winners of the trophy for the first time since 2016, breaking a 7 game winless streak and a 6 game losing streak. Hill reclaimed the trophy the next year, in 2025.

Yearly Match Results

- 2014: Hassocks 2-2 Burgess Hill
- 2015: Hassocks 2-2 Burgess Hill
- 2016: Hassocks 3-0 Burgess Hill
- 2017: Hassocks 3-3 Burgess Hill
- 2018: Hassocks 0-4 Burgess Hill
- 2019: Hassocks 2-3 Burgess Hill
- 2020: Hassocks 1-8 Burgess Hill (match held in December due to COVID-19 restrictions in pre-season)
- 2021: Hassocks 0-6 Burgess Hill
- 2022: Hassocks 1-2 Burgess Hill
- 2023: Hassocks 0-2 Burgess Hill
- 2024: Hassocks 2-0 Burgess Hill
- 2025: Hassocks 1-2 Burgess Hill
- 2026: Hassocks 3-0 Burgess Hill

The current Head-to-Head record for Burgess Hill is 7 wins, 3 draws and 2 losses.

== Club honours ==
=== League ===
- Isthmian League

Division One South champions (1): 2014-15
Division One South East play-off winners (1): 2024–25

- Sussex County League

Division 1 champions (6): 1975–76, 1996–97, 1997–98, 1998–99,
2001–02, 2002–03
Division 2 champions: (1): 1974–75

- Mid-Sussex Football League

Champions (5): 1900–01, 1903–04, 1939–40, 1946–47, 1956–57

=== Cups ===
- Floodlit Cup

Winners (2): 1997, 2000

- The Sussex Royal Ulster Rifles Charity Cup

Winners (2): 1991–92, 1999–2000
Runners-up (3): 1977–78, 1998–99, 2000–01

- John O’Hara League Challenge Cup

Winners (4): 1973–74, 1979–80, 1997–98, 1998–99

- Sussex Senior Challenge Cup

Winners (3): 1883–84, 1884–85, 1885–86
Runners-up (4): 1882-83, 1888-89, 1997-98, 2018-19

- Roy Hayden Trophy

Winners (1): 2003–04

- Norman Wingate Trophy

Winners (1): 2002–03

- Mid Sussex Senior Charity Cup

Winners (3): 1992–93, 1996–97, 2001–02

- Mowatt Cup

Winners (1): 1945–46

- Montgomery Cup

Winners (2): 1939–40, 1956–57

=== Other ===
- Sussex County Reserve Section

Champions (5): 1977–78, 1979–80, 1984–85, 1989–90, 1991–92

- Sussex County Reserve Section Cup

Winners (5): 1982–83, 1989–90, 1992–93, 1998–99, 2002–03

- Sussex Intermediate Cup

Winners (1): 1976–77

- Ann John Trophy

Sole winners (6): 2018, 2019, 2020, 2021, 2022, 2023
Joint winners (3): 2014, 2015, 2017

- Sussex Junior Cup

Winners (1): 1889–90

- Sussex County Youth League

Champions (6): 1992–93, 1993–94, 1995–96, 1996–97, 1997–98, 2004–05

- Sussex County Youth League Cup

Winners (5): 1991–92, 1997–98, 1999–2000, 2003–04, 2004—05

- Sussex Youth Cup

Winners (1): 2004–05

== Records ==
- Best league performance: 8th Isthmian League Premier Division, 2025-26
- Best FA Cup performance: 4th qualifying round, 1999-00, 2008–09, 2014–15
- Best FA Trophy performance: 2nd round proper, 2003–04, 2004–05, 2014–15, 2020–21, 2026–27
- Best FA Vase performance: Quarter-finals, 2001–02
- Record attendance: 2,005 vs AFC Wimbledon, 30 April 2005
- Most appearances: Paul Williams, 499
- Most goals: Ashley Carr, 208

== Sources ==
- Burgess Hill Town at the Football Club History Database
- Burgess Hill at the Football Club History Database

== See also ==
- Burgess Hill Town F.C. players
- Burgess Hill Town F.C. managers
