= Three Bridges F.C. =

Association football club in England

Coordinates: 51°06′55″N 0°10′04″W

Three Bridges
- Full name: Three Bridges Football Club
- Nickname: The Bridges
- Founded: 1901
- Ground: Jubilee Field, Three Bridges
- Capacity: 1,500
- Chairman: Paul Faili
- Manager: Jamie Crellin
- League: Isthmian League Premier Division
- 2025–26: Isthmian League South East Division, 1st of 22 (promoted)
| Home colours | Away colours |

Three Bridges Football Club is a football club based in Three Bridges in Crawley, West Sussex, England. The club is affiliated to the Sussex County Football Association. They were established in 1901 and were founding members of the Sussex County League Division Two in 1952. In the 1981–82 season, they reached the Third Round of the FA Vase. Currently they are members of the Isthmian League Premier Division.

== History ==
Three Bridges Football Club was founded in 1901. They joined the Mid-Sussex Junior League in 1902. They subsequently played in both the East Grinstead & District and Redhill & District Leagues. The team was known as Three Bridges and Worth and then Three Bridges United in 1948 after the merger with The Southern Railway Sports Club..

They were founder members of the Sussex County League Division Two in 1952–53. In 1953–54, the club were champions of Division Two and gained promotion to Division One. However, they only lasted one season at that level before returning to Division Two. The club's name reverted to Three Bridges in 1964, and in 1968–69, the club was promoted to Division One again, after finishing runners-up.

Three Bridges were relegated again in 1973, but spent only one season in Division Two before returning after another runners-up spot. In 1977, the club was relegated again, this time for three seasons before returning after finishing runners-up for a third time. In the 1981–82 season, they reached the Third Round of the FA Vase. In 1985–86, Three Bridges were runners-up in Division One, and again in 1987–88 and 1988–89. In 1997, the club was relegated again to Division One, but returned two seasons later after a fourth Division Two runners-up place. The club finally secured its first Sussex County League Division One championship in 2011–12 and gained promotion to the Isthmian League Division One South.

In the 2025–26 season, Three Bridges were promoted to the Isthmian League Premier Division as champions of the South East Division. They later completed a league and cup double, winning the Sussex Senior Cup for the first time in the club's history.

== Ground ==
Three Bridges play their home games at Jubilee Walk, Three Bridges Road, Crawley, West Sussex, RH10 1LQ.

== Honours ==
- Isthmian League South East Division
  - Champions 2025–26
- Sussex County League Division One
  - Champions 2011–12
  - Runners-up 1985–86, 1987–88, 1988–89
- Sussex County League Division Two
  - Champions 1953–54
  - Runners-up 1968–69, 1973–74, 1979–80, 1998–99

=== Cup honours ===
- The Sussex Royal Ulster Rifles Charity Cup
  - Winners (3): 1982–83, 1987–88, 2007–08
  - Runners Up (1): 2003–04
- Sussex Senior Challenge Cup
  - Winners 2025-26

== Records ==
- FA Cup: Third qualifying round, 2022–23
- FA Vase: Third qualifying round, 2020–21
- FA Vase: Fifth round, 1981–82
- Record attendance: 2,000 vs Horsham, 1948
- Most appearances: John Malthouse
