= List of Eastbourne Town F.C. seasons =

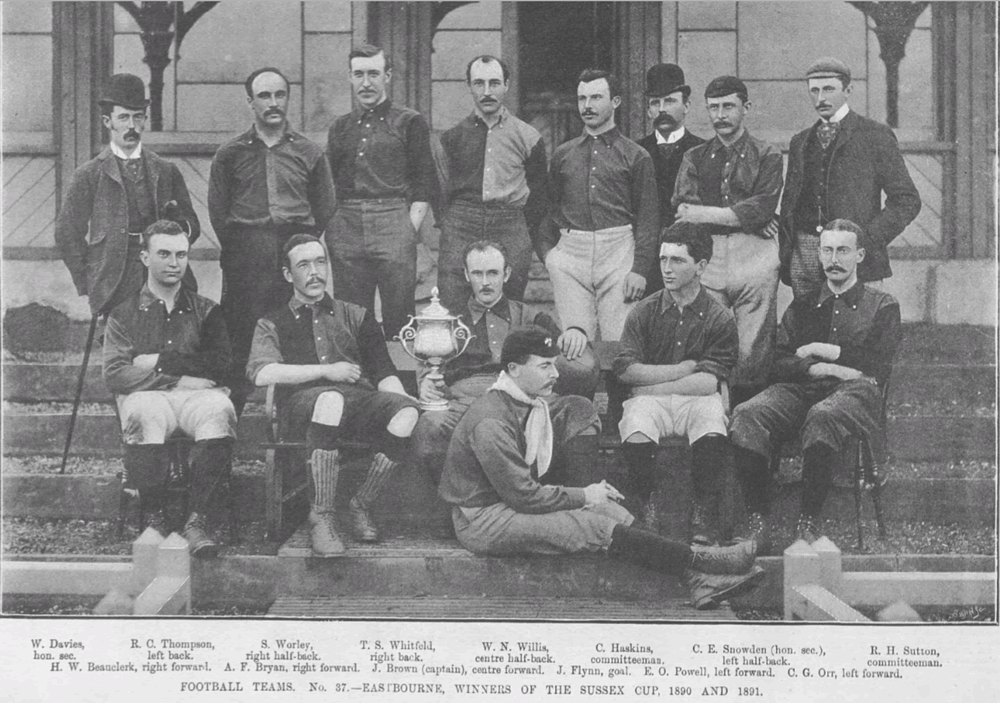
Eastbourne Football Club team photo from February 1892 displaying the Sussex Cup won in 1890 and 1891

This is a list of English football seasons played by Devonshire Park (1881 until 1889), Eastbourne (1889 until 1971) and Eastbourne Town Football Club from 1971 to the present day. Their early years (1881-1905) were spent playing in friendly and cup games. It wasn't until 1898 when Eastbourne competed in the FA Cup and FA Amateur Cup. Eastbourne joined the South Eastern League in 1905, replacing Eastbourne Swifts, the league agreed for Eastbourne to continue playing in their place. In 1907 Eastbourne were founder members of the Southern Amateur Football League and played between 1907 and 1946, winning the league on two occasions. Eastbourne were also founder members of the Sussex County League in 1920 playing just one season alongside the Southern Amateur league. Eastbourne left for the Corinthian League from 1946 until it merged with the Athenian League in 1963, playing in Divisions One and Two. In 1976, Eastbourne Town re-joined the Sussex County League playing in Divisions One and Two until promotion into the Isthmian Football League in 2007 before being relegated into back into the Sussex County League in 2015. In 2015, the Sussex County Football League was renamed into the Southern Combination Football League, the divisions being renamed into Premier and Division One.

== Key ==
Key to colours and symbols:

1st or W	Winners
2nd or RU	Runners-up
3rd	Third place
↑	Promoted
↓	Relegated

Key to divisions

- SE1 = South Eastern League Division 1
- SE2 = South Eastern League Division 2
- SA1 = Southern Amateur League Division 1
- SA2 = Southern Amateur League Division 2
- SAA = Southern Amateur League Section A
- SAB = Southern Amateur League Section B
- COR = Corinthian League
- AL1 = Athenian League Division One
- AL2 = Athenian League Division Two
- IL1 = Isthmian Division One South
- ISE = Isthmian South East Division
- SCP = South Combination Premier Division
- SC1 = Sussex County League Division One
- SC2 = Sussex County League Division Two

Key to league record

- P = Games played
- W = Games won
- D = Games drawn
- L = Games lost
- F = Goals for
- A = Goals against
- Pts = Points
- Pos = Final position

Key to rounds

- EP = Extra Prelimninary round
- PR = Preliminary round
- 1Q = First qualifying round
- 2Q = Second qualifying round, etc.
- 1R = First round
- 2R = Second round, etc.
- QF = Quarter-finals
- SF = Semi-finals

== Seasons ==
=== 1881–1900 ===
In this period, Devonshire Park and Eastbourne F.C. only competed in friendly games and later in the Sussex Senior Cup.

Season	∆	League										Major competitions		Other competitions					Top scorer		Average attendance	References
Season	∆	Division	P	W	D	L	F	A	GD	Pts	Pos	FA Cup	FA Amateur Cup	League Cup	Sussex Senior	RUR Cup	Other	Result	Top scorer		Average attendance	References
1881–82	–	Not entered	–	–	–	–	–	–	–	–	–	–	–	–	–	–	–	–	–			
1882–83	–	Not entered	–	–	–	–	–	–	–	–	–	–	–	–	–	–	–	–	–	–	–	
1883–84	–	Not entered	–	–	–	–	–	–	–	–	–	–	–	–	–	–	–	–	–	–	–	
1884–85	–	Not entered	–	–	–	–	–	–	–	–	–	–	–	–	–	–	–	–	–	–	–	
1885–86	–	Not entered	–	–	–	–	–	–	–	–	–	–	–	–	–	–	–	–	–	–	–	
1886–87	–	Not entered	–	–	–	–	–	–	–	–	–	–	–	–	–	–	–	–	–	–	–	
1887–88	–	Not entered	–	–	–	–	–	–	–	–	–	–	–	–	–	–	–	–	–	–	–	
1888–89	–	Not entered	–	–	–	–	–	–	–	–	–	–	–	–	SF	–	–	–	–	–	–	
1889	Renamed from Devonshire Park F.C. to Eastbourne F.C.																					
1889–90	–	Not entered	–	–	–	–	–	–	–	–	–	–	–	–	W	–	–	–	–	–	–	
1890–91	–	Sussex Senior Cup (League)	15	14	1	0	87	17	70	29	1st	–	–	–	W	–	–	–	–			
1891–92	–	Not entered	–	–	–	–	–	–	–	–	–	–	–	–	–	–	–	–	–	–	–	
1892–93	–	Not entered	–	–	–	–	–	–	–	–	–	–	–	–	RU	–	–	–	–	–	–	
1893–94	–	Not entered	–	–	–	–	–	–	–	–	–	–	–	–	W	–	–	–	–	–	–	
1894–95	–	Not entered	–	–	–	–	–	–	–	–	–	Withdrew	–	–	W	–	–	–	–	–	–	
1895–96	–	Not entered	–	–	–	–	–	–	–	–	–	–	–	–	–	–	–	–	–	–	–	
1896–97	–	Not entered	–	–	–	–	–	–	–	–	–	–	–	–	RU	–			–	–	–	
1897–98	–	Not entered	–	–	–	–	–	–	–	–	–	–	–	–	–	–	Eastbourne Charity Cup	W	–	–	–	
1898–99	–	Not entered	–	–	–	–	–	–	–	–	–	1Q	1R	–	W	–	Eastbourne Charity Cup	1R	–	–	–	
1899–1900	–	Not entered	–	–	–	–	–	–	–	–	–	1Q	2Q	–	W	–	Eastbourne Charity Cup	W	–	–	–	

=== 1900–1920 ===
In this period, Eastbourne only played in cup games before joining the Amateur Football League and the Southern Amateur League in 1907

Season	∆	League										Major competitions		Other competitions					Top scorer		Average attendance	References
Season	∆	Division	P	W	D	L	F	A	GD	Pts	Pos	FA Cup	FA Amateur Cup	AFA Senior Cup	Sussex Senior	RUR Cup	Other	Result	Top scorer		Average attendance	References
1900–01	–	Not entered	–	–	–	–	–	–	–	–	–	1Q	1R	–	W	–	Eastbourne Charity Cup	SF	–	–	–	
1901–02	–	Not entered	–	–	–	–	–	–	–	–	–	1Q	2Q	–	–	–	Eastbourne Charity Cup	RU	–	–	–	
1902–03	–	Not entered	–	–	–	–	–	–	–	–	–	–	2Q	–	W	–	Eastbourne Charity Cup	RU	–	–	–	
1903–04	–	Not entered	–	–	–	–	–	–	–	–	–	2Q	3Q	–	–	–	Eastbourne Charity Cup Tournoi du Nouvel An Paris	1R W	–	–	–	
1904–05	–	Not entered	–	–	–	–	–	–	–	–	–	–	1Q	–	–	–	Eastbourne Charity Cup Oxford Hospitals Cup	1R RU	–	–	–	
1905	Joined South Eastern League (as Eastbourne FC) replacing Eastbourne Swifts, who withdrew. Entered Division 1																					
1905–06	–	SE1 ↓	24	1	4	19	36	125	-89	6	13th	PR	2R	–	–	–	Eastbourne Charity Cup	W	C. Rudd Wallace Gardner	11	–	
1906–07	–	SE2	18	6	0	12	36	63	-27	12	7th	–	1R	–	RU	–	Eastbourne Charity Cup	SF	Wallace Gardner	31	–	
1907	Left South Eastern League and joined Southern Amateur League as founder members, entered Section A																					
1907–08	–	SAA	16	6	4	6	35	46	-11	16	6th	–	–	SF	–	–	Eastbourne Charity Cup	RU	Wallace Gardner	24	–	
1908–09	–	SAA	16	6	6	4	44	43	+1	27	3rd	–	–	2R	–	–	Challenge International du Nord Eastbourne Charity Cup Sussex AFA Cup	W 1R 1R	Wallace Gardner	20	–	
1909–10	–	SAA	16	7	3	6	37	43	-6	17	4th	–	–	3R	–	–	Challenge International du Nord Eastbourne Charity Cup Sussex AFA Cup	1R W RU	H. Grevett	20	–	
1910–11	–	SAA ↓	16	4	1	11	25	31	-6	9	8th	–	–	1R	–	–	Eastbourne Charity Cup Sussex AFA Cup	SF RU	W. Dann	9	–	
1911–12	–	SAB ↑	16	11	1	4	36	18	+18	23	2nd	–	–	2R	–	–	Eastbourne Charity Cup Sussex AFA Cup	RU SF	Jack French	21	–	
1912–13	–	SAA ↓	18	3	0	15	28	52	-24	6	10th	–	–	–	–	–	Eastbourne Charity Cup Sussex AFA Cup	SF RU	Donald Wood	10	–	
1913–14	–	SAB	14	7	2	5	34	23	+11	16	4th	–	–	2R	–	–	Eastbourne Charity Cup Sussex AFA Cup	W W	C. Cook Fred Garrard	7	–	
1914–19	Football was suspended until after the First World War																					
1919–20	–	SAA	12	11	0	1	48	20	+28	22	2nd	–	2R	–	3R	RU	Eastbourne Charity Cup	W	C. Goldsmith Guy Hollobone	20	–	

=== 1920–1946 ===
In this period, Eastbourne remained in the Southern Amateur League, but also joined the Sussex County League as a founding member, playing in two leagues for just one season.

Season	∆	League										Major competitions		Other competitions					Top scorer		Average attendance	References
Season	∆	Division	P	W	D	L	F	A	GD	Pts	Pos	FA Cup	FA Amateur Cup	AFA Senior Cup	Sussex Senior	RUR Cup	Other	Result	Top scorer		Average attendance	References
1920–21	Joined Sussex County league																					
1920–21	–	SA1	20	6	7	7	29	44	-15	19	8th	–	4Q	–	RU	–	Eastbourne Charity Cup	W	Guy Hollobone	26	–	
1920–21	–	SC1	21	13	6	2	63	31	+32	32	3rd	–	4Q	–	RU	–	Eastbourne Charity Cup	W	Guy Hollobone	26	–	
1921	Left Sussex County league																					
1921–22	–	SA1	20	14	3	3	60	31	+29	31	2nd	–	1Q	W	W	–	Eastbourne Charity Cup	1R	Guy Hollobone	33	–	
1922–23	–	SA1	19	14	1	4	79	32	+47	32	1st	–	2R	RU	RU	–	–	–	Guy Hollobone	28	–	
1923–24	–	SA1	20	10	1	9	43	43	0	21	6th	–	1Q	RU	3R	–	Eastbourne Charity Cup	RU	Guy Hollobone	25	–	
1924–25	–	SA1	20	11	2	7	37	35	+2	24	4th	–	1R	W	–	–	Eastbourne Charity Cup	RU	Guy Hollobone	19	–	
1925–26	–	SA1	22	14	3	5	67	53	+14	31	1st	–	1R	1R	RU	RU	Eastbourne Charity Cup	W	Guy Hollobone	25	–	
1926–27	–	SA1	22	9	7	6	53	47	+6	25	3rd	–	1R	2R	–	–	Eastbourne Charity Cup	W	Tommy Francis	23	–	
1927–28	–	SA1	24	9	7	8	65	56	+9	25	5th	–	1R	3R	RU	–	Eastbourne Charity Cup	RU	E. Bean	18	–	
1928–29	–	SA1	21	8	3	10	51	60	-9	19	6th	–	1R	2R	2R	–	Eastbourne Charity Cup	RU	Tommy Francis	19	–	
1929–30	–	SA1	22	14	2	6	72	41	+31	30	2nd	–	1R	3R	2R	–	–	–	Tommy Francis	37	–	
1930–31	–	SA1	22	9	3	10	71	57	+14	21	6th	–	4Q	3R	2R	–	Eastbourne Charity Cup	SF	Vic Francis	37	–	
1931–32	–	SA1	22	9	5	8	54	50	+4	23	6th	–	2Q	1R	W	SF	Eastbourne Charity Cup	SF	Vic Francis	33		
1932–33	–	SA1	22	7	2	13	42	57	-15	16	8th	–	1Q	3R	W	W	Eastbourne Charity Cup	W	Vic Francis	25		
1933–34	–	SA1	22	10	3	9	41	34	+7	23	4th	–	3Q	3R	SF	SF	Eastbourne Charity Cup	W	Vic Francis	19	–	
1934–35	–	SA1	22	6	3	13	41	47	-6	15	11th	–	1Q	1R	1R	–	Eastbourne Charity Cup	RU	C. Burton Reg Teague	12	–	
1935–36	–	SA1	22	9	5	8	58	49	+9	23	6th	–	4Q	3R	2R	–	Eastbourne Charity Cup	W	F. Kennedy	22	–	
1936–37	–	SA1	22	8	3	11	54	53	+1	19	9th	–	PR	1R	1R	SF	Eastbourne Charity Cup	W	Stan Joyce	17	–	
1937–38	–	SA1 ↓	22	5	5	12	37	57	-20	15	11th	–	1Q	2R	2R	–	Eastbourne Charity Cup Newhaven Charity Cup	RU RU	Stan Joyce	13	–	
1938–39	–	SA2 ↑	18	11	2	5	47	30	+17	24	1st	–	1Q	1R	1R	–	Eastbourne Charity Cup Newhaven Charity Cup	W RU	Tommy Francis	18	–	
1939	Played in the Sussex County League East Division at the start of the Second World War																					
1939–40	–	SCFL East Division	14	4	4	6	30	35	-5	12	6th	–	–	–	1R	1R	Eastbourne Charity Cup Baldwin Cup	RU RU	P. Davies	8	–	
1939–45	Football was suspended until after the Second World War																					
1944–45	–	–										–	–	–	–	–	Eastbourne Charity Cup	W			–	
1945–46	–	SA1	14	7	2	5	43	31	+12	16	5th	–	3R	–	SF	RU	–	–	Paddy Tracey	30	–	

=== 1946–1960 ===
In this period, Eastbourne left the Southern Amateur League and joined the Corinthian League.

Season	∆	League										Major competitions		Other competitions					Top scorer		Average attendance	References
Season	∆	Division	P	W	D	L	F	A	GD	Pts	Pos	FA Cup	FA Amateur Cup	League Cup	Sussex Senior	RUR Cup	Other	Result	Top scorer		Average attendance	References
1946	Left the Southern Amateur League and joined the Corinthian League																					
1946–47	–	COR	24	8	2	14	57	80	-23	18	10th	4Q	1R	1R	1R	SF	–	–	Paddy Tracey	29	–	
1947–48	–	COR	26	10	4	12	68	80	-12	24	9th	–	4Q	1R	SF	W	Eastbourne Charity Cup Newhaven Charity Cup	W W	Paddy Tracey	25	–	
1948–49	–	COR	24	6	4	14	49	68	-19	16	12th	–	4Q	2R	2R	SF	Newhaven Charity Cup	W	Charlie Morgan	21	–	
1949–50	–	COR	26	10	7	9	52	46	+6	27	7th	–	4Q	1R	1R	W	Eastbourne Charity Cup	W	William Stovell	30	–	
1950–51	–	COR	26	8	3	15	47	65	-18	19	12th	4Q	3R	1R	RU	1R	–	–	William Stovell	35	–	
1951–52	–	COR	26	9	7	10	53	53	0	25	8th	3Q	2R	2R	1R	1R	–	–	Alan Burgess	30	–	
1952–53	–	COR	26	7	7	12	40	58	-18	21	11th	PR	–	SF	W	SF	Eastbourne Charity Cup	W	Alan Burgess	24	–	
1953–54	–	COR	26	11	5	10	47	45	+2	25	8th	2Q	PR	SF	SF	SF	–	–	Jim Simmonds	14	–	
1954–55	–	COR	28	3	7	18	24	63	-39	13	14th	2Q	2Q	1R	3R	–	–	–	Jim Simmonds	9	–	
1955–56	–	COR	26	6	4	16	29	54	-14	16	12th	1Q	2Q	1R	2R	RU	–	–	Derek Morris	11	–	
1956–57	–	COR	28	12	6	10	67	56	+11	30	7th	2Q	2Q	SF	1R	1R	Freeman Thomas Shield	W	Gerry Colbran	26	–	
1957–58	–	COR	28	7	9	12	40	50	-10	23	10th	PR	1R	2R	1R	SF	–	–	Ron Applebee	22	–	
1958–59	–	COR	26	5	7	14	28	50	-22	17	13th	PR	4Q	1R	2R	–	AFA Invitation Cup Eastbourne Charity Cup	SF W	Ron Applebee	13	–	
1959–60	–	COR	30	8	4	18	41	67	-26	20	15th	2Q	PR	SF	R1	–	AFA Invitation Cup	SF	R. Charlton	8	–	

=== 1960–1980 ===
In this period, Eastbourne left the Corinthian League and joined the Athenian League, later renamed to Eastbourne Town and joined the Sussex County League.

Season	∆	League										Major competitions			Other competitions					Top scorer		Average attendance	References
Season	∆	Division	P	W	D	L	F	A	GD	Pts	Pos	FA Cup	FA Amateur	FA Vase	League Cup	Sussex Senior	RUR Cup	Other	Result	Top scorer		Average attendance	References
1960–61	–	COR	30	10	6	14	50	59	-9	26	11th	2Q	1Q	–	1R	3R	–	AFA Invitation Cup	SF	Jimmy Grant	11	–	
1961–62	–	COR	30	8	6	16	39	57	-18	22	13th	–	2R	–	1R	3R	1R	AFA Invitation Cup Eastbourne Charity Cup	SF W	Jimmy Grant	16	–	
1962–63	–	COR	30	7	5	18	43	76	-33	19	14th	1Q	2R	–	2R	3R	–	Eastbourne Charity Cup	W	Arthur Williams	19	–	
1963	Joined the Athenian League																						
1963–64	–	AL1	26	7	3	16	44	75	-31	17	11th	1Q	1R	–	2R	3R	RU	AFA Invitation Cup Eastbourne Charity Cup	SF RU	Dave Delea	11	–	
1964–65	–	AL1	30	9	9	12	53	67	-14	27	10th	2Q	2R	–	1R	3R	–	Eastbourne Charity Cup	W	Bobby Wilson	17	–	
1965–66	–	AL1 ↓	30	6	3	21	45	81	-36	15	16th	1Q	2R	–	1R	3R	–	AFA Invitation Cup Eastbourne Charity Cup	SF W	Pat Tracey	15	–	
1966–67	–	AL2	30	9	5	16	51	61	-10	23	13th	1Q	1R	–	1R	2R	–	AFA Invitation Cup Eastbourne Charity Cup	SF RU	John Beasley	12	–	
1967–68	–	AL2	30	5	3	22	37	94	-57	13	15th	4Q	1R	–	1R	4R	–	AFA Invitation Cup Eastbourne Charity Cup	1R RU	Barry Taylor	19	–	
1968–69	–	AL2	30	17	5	5	60	33	+27	42	3rd	4Q	4Q	–	1R	3R		AFA Invitation Cup Eastbourne Charity Cup	RU W	Barry Taylor	33	–	
1969–70	–	AL2	30	17	7	6	48	26	+22	41	4th	2Q	PR	–	1R	SF	–	AFA Invitation Cup Eastbourne Charity Cup	W W	Barry Taylor	27	–	
1970–71	–	AL2	30	12	5	13	41	42	-1	29	8th	2Q	1Q	–	1R	2R	–	AFA Invitation Cup Round Table Trophy	RU W	Barry Taylor	20	–	
1971	Renamed from Eastbourne F.C. to Eastbourne Town F.C.																						
1971–72	–	AL2	30	5	12	13	24	42	-18	22	12th	1Q	PR	–	2R	1R	–	Eastbourne Charity Cup Round Table Trophy	SF 1R	Barry Taylor	9	–	
1972–73	–	AL2	26	6	2	18	24	51	-27	14	12th	1Q	PR	–	2R	RU	–	–	–	Roger Savage	6	–	
1973–74	–	AL2	30	8	7	15	31	46	-15	23	13th	2Q	2Q	–	3R	SF	–	Eastbourne Charity Cup	RU	Paul Rogers	11	–	
1974–75	–	AL2	28	14	8	6	38	25	+13	36	5th	1Q	–	4R	2R	2R	–	–	–	Wayne Peacock	16	–	
1975–76	–	AL2 ↓	30	11	9	10	45	42	+3	31	7th	2Q	–	5R	RU	SF	–	–	–	Wayne Peacock	28	–	
1976	Joined Sussex County League																						
1976–77	9	SC1	30	18	8	4	51	21	+30	44	1st	1Q	–	3R	2R	2R	3R	–	–	Trevor Gurr	23	–	
1977–78	9	SC1	30	13	5	12	56	44	+12	31	8th	2Q	–	3R	2R	RU	1R	Roy Hayden Memorial Trophy	RU	Alan Wilson	19	–	
1978–79	9	SC1	30	10	6	14	47	51	-4	26	11th	1Q	–	2R	2R	1R	2R	Eastbourne Charity Cup	RU	Bert Roebuck	12	–	
1979–80	9	SC1	30	13	9	8	50	37	+13	35	5th	2Q	–	1R	1R	1R	QF	Eastbourne Charity Cup	RU	Wally Manton	9	–	

=== 1980–2000 ===
In this period, Eastbourne Town played in the Sussex County League.

Season	∆	League										Major competitions		Other competitions					Top scorer		Average attendance	References
Season	∆	Division	P	W	D	L	F	A	GD	Pts	Pos	FA Cup	FA Vase	League Cup	Sussex Senior	RUR Cup	Other	Result	Top scorer		Average attendance	References
1980–81	9	SC1	30	10	6	14	36	41	-5	26	13th	1Q	PR	2R	1R	2R	Eastbourne Charity Cup	W	Peter Andrews	6	–	
1981–82	9	SC1	30	11	3	16	38	43	-5	25	13th	1Q	2R	2R	1R	2R	Eastbourne Charity Cup	W	Des Brockwell	12	–	
1982–83	9	SC1	30	9	10	11	36	51	-15	28	9th	1Q	PR	2R	1R	QF	Eastbourne Charity Cup	RU	Tim Williams	11	–	
1983–84	9	SC1 (Note: This season saw the introduction of three points for a win instead of two.)	30	8	8	14	33	43	-10	32	10th	1Q	PR	1R	3R	1R	Borough Centenary Cup Eastbourne Charity Cup	W RU	Pip Facer	8	–	
1984–85	9	SC1	30	19	6	5	66	26	+40	63	3rd	2Q	PR	2R	2R	SF	Borough Centenary Cup Eastbourne Charity Cup	W RU	John Kemp	32	–	
1985–86	9	SC1	30	18	7	5	71	23	+48	61	3rd	1Q	2R	2R	QF	W	Borough Centenary Cup Eastbourne Charity Cup	RU W	John Kemp	33	–	
1986–87	9	SC1	30	15	11	4	56	23	+33	56	5th	2Q	2R	2R	2R	W	Borough Centenary Cup	W	Derrick Smith	24	–	
1987–88	9	SC1	30	17	4	9	63	41	+22	55	4th	—	2R	QF	3R	2R	Borough Centenary Cup Eastbourne Charity Cup Maybank Cup	RU W W	Nigel Hole	32	–	
1988–89	9	SC1	34	9	9	16	46	58	-12	36	15th	—	3R	2R	QF	1R	Eastbourne Charity Cup	W	Derrick Smith	22	–	
1989–90	9	SC1	34	9	8	17	42	58	-16	35	15th	—	EP	1R	2R	2R	Eastbourne Charity Cup	RU	Derrick Smith	15	–	
1990–91	9	SC1	34	7	7	20	32	54	-18	28	16th	—	PR	2R	1R	2R	Eastbourne Charity Cup John Gower Memorial Trophy	RU W	Kenny Mackay	8	–	
1991–92	9	SC1	34	12	4	18	33	63	-30	40	12th	PR	EP	QF	QF	2R	Charles Reynolds Memorial Trophy Eastbourne Charity Cup John Gower Memorial Trophy	RU RU RU	Steve Loughton	19	–	
1992–93	9	SC1	34	8	4	22	35	78	-43	28	17th	PR	PR	QF	2R	1R	–	–	Roger Myall	12	–	
1993–94	9	SC1	38	10	7	21	41	73	-33	37	17th	—	EP	1R	1R	1R	–	–	Roger Myall	14	–	
1994–95	9	SC1	38	10	10	18	50	79	-29	40	12th	PR	PR	1R	2R	1R	–	–	Tobi Hutchinson	13	–	
1995–96	9	SC1	38	12	4	2	51	89	-38	40	14th	—	1Q	2R	2R	PR	Eastbourne Charity Cup	RU	Rob Forster	11	–	
1996–97	9	SC1	38	17	6	15	59	51	+8	57	7th	—	2Q	1R	3R	PR	–	–	Steve Loughton	27	–	
1997–98	9	SC1	38	12	7	19	54	73	-19	43	14th	PR	1R	2R	2R	–	Eastbourne Charity Cup	RU	Ben Carrington	15	–	
1998–99	9	SC1	38	14	12	12	61	62	-1	54	10th	2Q	2Q	SF	3R	QF	–	–	Gary Brockwell	21	–	
1999–2000	9	SC1	38	14	14	10	73	49	+24	56	9th	1Q	2	2R	2R	QF	Eastbourne Charity Cup	W	Gary Brockwell	23	–	

=== 2000–2020 ===
In this period, Eastbourne Town were promoted into the Isthmian League and played in the FA Trophy for the first time.

Season	∆	League										Major competitions			Other competitions					Top scorer		Average attendance	References
Season	∆	Division	P	W	D	L	F	A	GD	Pts	Pos	FA Cup	FA Trophy	FA Vase	League Cup	Sussex Senior	RUR Cup	Other	Result	Top scorer		Average attendance	References
2000–01	9	SC1 ↓	38	9	8	21	47	66	-19	35	19th	PR	—	1R	QF	2R	1R	–	–	Lee Walsh	10	118	
2001–02	10	SC2	34	20	5	8	84	39	+45	65	4th	PR	—	2Q	1R	1R	3R	–	–	Gary Brockwell	29	109	
2002–03	10	SC2 ↑	34	25	7	2	97	28	+69	82	2nd	PR	—	2Q	2R	QF	3R	–	–	Yemi Odubade	44	122	
2003–04	9	SC1	36	21	3	12	85	53	+32	66	5th	PR	—	2Q	SF	3R	2R	–	–	Yemi Odubade	31	141	
2004–05	9	SC1	38	14	10	14	56	57	-1	52	10th	PR	—	2Q	QF	3R	QF	Eastbourne Charity Cup	RU	Steve Dallaway	18	132	
2005–06	9	SC1	38	19	8	11	69	44	-25	65	5th	1Q	—	2Q	3R	QF	2R	–	–	Steve Dallaway	19	148	
2006–07	9	SC1 ↑	38	27	6	5	97	42	+55	87	1st	PR	—	4R	SF	3R	3R	–	–	Liam Baitup	42	192	
2007	Promoted to Isthmian League																						
2007–08	8	IL1	42	11	11	20	58	84	-26	44	19th	1Q	1Q	—	3R	2R	—	Roy Hayden Memorial Trophy Norman Wingate Trophy	RU RU	Liam Baitup	28	206	
2008–09	8	IL1	42	17	6	19	66	72	-6	57	13th	1Q	PR	—	4R	2R	—	–	–	Liam Baitup	13	176	
2009–10	8	IL1	42	6	11	25	29	77	-48	29	22nd	PR	PR	—	2R	3R	—	–	–	Danny Simmonds	6	150	
2010–11	8	IL1	42	11	11	20	60	78	-18	44	18th	1Q	PR	—	3R	3R	—	–	–	Sam Crabb	12	154	
2011–12	8	IL1	40	11	14	15	49	62	-13	47	14th	PR	1Q	—	3R	2R	—	–	–	Danny Curd	9	189	
2012–13	8	IL1	42	16	9	17	62	61	+1	57	11th	2Q	1Q	—	2R	4R	—	–	–	Danny Curd	13	190	
2013–14	8	IL1 ↓	46	6	11	29	60	121	-61	29	24th	2Q	1Q	—	1R	3R	—	–	–	Billy Medlock	30	156	
2014	Relegated to Sussex County League																						
2014–15	9	SC1	38	21	9	8	96	44	+52	72	4th	PR	—	1R	QF	2R	W	–	–	Dominic Clarke	17	149	
2015	Sussex County League renamed to Southern Combination League																						
2015–16	9	SCP	38	27	5	6	107	42	+65	86	2nd	3Q	—	3R	3R	3R	2R	–	–	Jason Taylor	29	174	
2016–17	9	SCP	38	21	7	10	85	60	+25	70	5th	1Q	—	4R	2R	2R	3R	–	–	Evan Archibald	26	190	
2017–18	9	SCP	38	19	12	7	81	40	+41	69	5th	1Q	—	4R	2R	2R	2R	–	–	Evan Archibald	24	247	
2018–19	9	SCP	38	26	5	7	99	50	+49	83	3rd	EP	—	3R	3R	QF	2R	–	–	Daniel Perry	34	232	
2019–20	9	SCP	28	19	5	4	79	25	+57	62	2nd (Note: 2019–20 League abandoned due to the COVID-19 pandemic, all league results expunged see 2019–20 Southern Combination League for final standings. RUR Cup competition results expunded also)	PR	—	3R	2R	1R	Final	–	–	Zac Attwood	15	216	

=== 2020– ===
Season	∆	League										Major competitions			Other competitions					Top scorer		Average attendance	References
Season	∆	Division	P	W	D	L	F	A	GD	Pts	Pos	FA Cup	FA Trophy	FA Vase	League Cup	Sussex Senior	RUR Cup	Other	Result	Top scorer		Average attendance	References
2020–21	9	SCP	14	8	2	4	30	20	+10	26	4th (Note: 2020–21 League curtailed due to the COVID-19 pandemic, see 2020–21 Southern Combination League for final standings. A Supplementary Shield took place during April and May; See here for details)	PR	—	1R	–	–	–	–	–	Nathan Crabb	9	293	
2021–22	9	SCP	38	20	7	11	74	45	+29	67	6th	PR	—	1Q	2R	QF	QF	–	–	Louis Veneti	18	255	
2022–23	9	SCP	38	19	9	10	58	32	+26	66	9th	1Q	—	3R	2R	2R	1R	–	–	Fletcher Holman	17	203	
2023–24	9	SCP ↑	38	26	4	8	71	31	+40	82	2nd	EP	—	1R	2R	1R	SF	–	–	Ollie Davies	23	218	
2024	Promoted to Isthmian League																						
2024–25	8	ISE	42	15	8	19	56	66	-10	53	15th	PR	1Q	—	—	3R	—	Eastbourne Charity Cup	W	James Stone	20	220	
2025–26	8	ISE	42	16	8	18	63	77	-14	56	11th	EP	1Q	—	—	3R	—	–	–	Alfie Rogers	12	286	
2026–27	8	ISE										PR	2Q	—	—	3R	—						

== Notes ==
Sources for League, FA Cup, FA Trophy and FA Vase statistics:

- Eastbourne at the Football Club History Database
- Eastbourne Town at the Football Club History Database
