= 2005–06 Sussex County Football League =

Association football league season

The 2005–06 Sussex County Football League season was the 81st in the history of Sussex County Football League a football competition in England.

== Division One ==
Sussex County Football League Division One
- Season: 2005–06
- Champions: Horsham YMCA
- Promoted: Horsham YMCA
- Relegated: Southwick
- Matches: 380
- Goals: 1,105 (2.91 per match)

Division One featured 17 clubs which competed in the division last season, along with three new clubs, promoted from Division Two:

- Crowborough Athletic
- Shoreham
- Wick

=== League table ===
Pos	Team	Pld	W	D	L	GF	GA	GD	Pts	Qualification or relegation
1	Horsham YMCA	38	27	7	4	83	31	+52	88	Promoted to the Isthmian League Division One South
2	Ringmer	38	24	7	7	68	34	+34	79	
3	Whitehawk	38	20	7	11	66	36	+30	67	
4	Littlehampton Town	38	20	7	11	63	44	+19	67	
5	Eastbourne Town	38	19	8	11	69	44	+25	65	
6	Crowborough Athletic	38	19	8	11	68	45	+23	65	
7	Arundel	38	16	15	7	61	43	+18	63	
8	Chichester City United	38	17	9	12	61	55	+6	60	
9	Hassocks	38	15	12	11	63	48	+15	57	
10	Hailsham Town	38	13	13	12	43	46	−3	52	
11	Sidley United	38	16	4	18	65	80	−15	52	
12	Wick	38	14	9	15	56	49	+7	51	
13	Shoreham	38	15	6	17	58	59	−1	51	
14	Eastbourne United Association	38	12	8	18	48	62	−14	44	
15	Three Bridges	38	10	12	16	46	50	−4	42	
16	East Preston	38	8	15	15	41	60	−19	39	
17	Worthing United	38	9	12	17	41	60	−19	39	
18	Redhill	38	10	4	24	39	78	−39	34	
19	Rye & Iden United	38	4	8	26	38	83	−45	20	
20	Southwick	38	2	9	27	28	98	−70	15	Relegated to Division Two

Source: nonleaguematters
Rules for classification: 1) points; 2) goal difference; 3) number of goals scored.

== Division Two ==
Sussex County Football League Division Two
- Season: 2005–06
- Champions: Oakwood
- Promoted: Oakwood; Selsey
- Relegated: Bexhill United
- Matches: 306
- Goals: 1,057 (3.45 per match)

Division Two featured 13 clubs which competed in the division last season, along with five new clubs.

- Clubs relegated from Division One:
  - East Grinstead Town
  - Pagham
  - Sidlesham
- Clubs promoted from Division Three:
  - Bexhill United
  - Storrington

Also, Seaford changed name to Seaford Town.

=== League table ===
Pos	Team	Pld	W	D	L	GF	GA	GD	Pts	Qualification or relegation
1	Oakwood	34	25	5	4	87	25	+62	80	Promoted to Division One
2	Selsey	34	23	6	5	80	28	+52	75	Promoted to Division One
3	St Francis Rangers	34	20	8	6	85	42	+43	71 (Note: St Francis Rangers were awarded three points.)	
4	Westfield	34	18	4	12	67	52	+15	58	
5	Crawley Down	34	15	10	9	61	43	+18	55	
6	Wealden	34	16	7	11	64	62	+2	55	
7	East Grinstead Town	34	17	3	14	70	61	+9	54	
8	Mile Oak	34	15	7	12	61	53	+8	49 (Note: Mile Oak were deducted three points.)	
9	Seaford Town	34	12	6	16	57	64	−7	42	
10	Sidlesham	34	10	11	13	53	56	−3	41	
11	Broadbridge Heath	34	12	5	17	53	69	−16	41	
12	Lancing	34	11	7	16	42	53	−11	40	
13	Pagham	34	9	12	13	65	63	+2	39	
14	Storrington	34	11	6	17	47	63	−16	39	
15	Steyning Town	34	10	8	16	50	69	−19	38	
16	Saltdean United	34	11	3	20	45	75	−30	36	
17	Midhurst & Easebourne	34	8	7	19	42	70	−28	31	
18	Bexhill United	34	3	5	26	28	109	−81	14	Relegated to Division Three

Source: nonleaguematters
Rules for classification: 1) points; 2) goal difference; 3) number of goals scored.

== Division Three ==
Sussex County Football League Division Three
- Season: 2005–06
- Champions: Peacehaven & Telscombe
- Promoted: Peacehaven & Telscombe; Lingfield
- Relegated: Wadhurst United; Upper Beeding
- Matches: 182
- Goals: 706 (3.88 per match)

Division Three featured eleven clubs which competed in the division last season, along with three new clubs:

- Little Common, joined from the East Sussex League
- Peacehaven & Telscombe, relegated from Division Two
- Pease Pottage Village, relegated from Division Two

=== League table ===
Pos	Team	Pld	W	D	L	GF	GA	GD	Pts	Qualification or relegation
1	Peacehaven & Telscombe	26	20	2	4	81	31	+50	62	Promoted to Division Two
2	Lingfield	26	19	3	4	73	29	+44	60	Promoted to Division Two
3	Rustington	26	17	4	5	65	31	+34	55	
4	Newhaven	26	15	5	6	61	31	+30	50	
5	Forest	26	13	7	6	51	37	+14	46	
6	Ifield Edwards	26	13	1	12	68	52	+16	40	
7	Hurstpierpoint	26	11	5	10	47	49	−2	38	
8	Haywards Heath Town	26	10	7	9	57	41	+16	37	
9	Little Common	26	10	3	13	43	50	−7	33	
10	Bosham	26	9	5	12	44	58	−14	29 (Note: Bosham were deducted three points.)	
11	Uckfield Town	26	8	3	15	30	46	−16	27	
12	Pease Pottage Village	26	7	5	14	39	51	−12	26	
13	Wadhurst United	26	3	3	20	33	78	−45	12	Relegated to the East Sussex League
14	Upper Beeding	26	0	1	25	14	122	−108	4 (Note: Upper Beeding were awarded three points.)	Relegated to the West Sussex League

Source: nonleaguematters
Rules for classification: 1) points; 2) goal difference; 3) number of goals scored.
