= 2007–08 Isthmian League =

The 2007–08 season was the 93rd season of the Isthmian League, which is an English football competition featuring semi-professional and amateur clubs from London, East and South East England.

== Premier Division ==
Isthmian League Premier Division
- Season: 2007–08
- Champions: Chelmsford City
- Promoted: AFC Wimbledon; Chelmsford City
- Relegated: East Thurrock United; Folkestone Invicta; Leyton
- Matches: 462
- Goals: 1,423 (3.08 per match)
- Top goalscorer: 26 goals – Mark Nwokeji (Staines Town)
- Highest attendance: 3,201 – Chelmsford City – AFC Wimbledon, (15 March)
- Total attendance: 233,047
- Average attendance: 504 (+2.6% to previous season)

The Premier Division consisted of 22 clubs, including 17 clubs from the previous season, and five new clubs:

- AFC Hornchurch, promoted as champions of Division One North
- Harlow Town, promoted as play-off winners in Division One North
- Hastings United, promoted as play-off winners in Division One South
- Maidstone United, promoted as champions of Division One South
- Wealdstone, transferred from the Southern Football League Premier Division

Chelmsford City won the division and were promoted to the Conference South along with play-off winners AFC Wimbledon, who earned a third promotion in the six-year history of the reborn club. East Thurrock United, Folkestone Invicta and Leyton were relegated to the Division One sections while Boreham Wood were reprieved from relegation due to Conference clubs Halifax Town folding and Nuneaton Borough being demoted two divisions down.

=== League table ===
Pos	Team	Pld	W	D	L	GF	GA	GD	Pts	Promotion or relegation
1	Chelmsford City	42	26	9	7	84	39	+45	87	Promoted to the Conference South
2	Staines Town	42	22	12	8	85	54	+31	78	Qualified for the play-offs
3	AFC Wimbledon	42	22	9	11	81	47	+34	75	Qualified for the play-offs, then promoted to the Conference South
4	AFC Hornchurch	42	20	10	12	68	44	+24	70	Qualified for the play-offs
5	Ramsgate	42	19	11	12	67	53	+14	68	Qualified for the play-offs
6	Ashford Town (Middlesex)	42	20	6	16	79	65	+14	66	
7	Hendon	42	18	11	13	79	67	+12	65	
8	Tonbridge Angels	42	17	12	13	77	57	+20	63	
9	Margate	42	17	11	14	71	68	+3	62	
10	Billericay Town	42	16	12	14	66	57	+9	60	
11	Horsham	42	18	5	19	63	63	0	59	
12	Heybridge Swifts	42	14	13	15	64	64	0	55	
13	Wealdstone	42	15	9	18	68	75	−7	54	
14	Hastings United	42	15	8	19	58	67	−9	53	
15	Harlow Town	42	13	13	16	56	52	+4	52	
16	Harrow Borough	42	15	7	20	61	74	−13	52	
17	Maidstone United	42	16	4	22	56	79	−23	52	
18	Carshalton Athletic	42	14	8	20	52	65	−13	50	
19	Boreham Wood	42	15	5	22	56	73	−17	50	Reprieved from relegation
20	East Thurrock United	42	14	9	19	48	67	−19	50 (Note: East Thurrock United were deducted one point for fielding an ineligible player against Harrow Borough on 8 December 2007 (0–0).)	Relegated to Division One North
21	Folkestone Invicta	42	13	10	19	49	70	−21	49	Relegated to Division One South
22	Leyton	42	4	4	34	35	123	−88	16	Relegated to Division One North

Rules for classification: 1) points; 2) goal difference; 3) number of goals scored.

==== Top scorers ====
Player	Club	Goals
Mark Nwokeji	Staines Town	26
James Pinnock	Margate	24
Carl Rook	Horsham / Tonbridge Angels	23
Brian Haule	Hendon	20
Steven Wareham	Maldon Town / East Thurrock United	20
John Main	Tonbridge Angels / AFC Wimbledon	20
Reggie Savage	Croydon Athletic / Heybridge Swifts	19
Bradley Woods-Garness	Billericay Town	19
Simon Parker	AFC Hornchurch	18
Stafford Browne	Heybridge Swifts	17

=== Play-offs ===
Semifinals
2	Staines Town	2
5	Ramsgate	1
3	AFC Wimbledon	3
4	AFC Hornchurch	1

Final
2	Staines Town	1
3	AFC Wimbledon	2

=== Stadia and locations ===
Locations of the Premier Division clubs
Greater London Premier Division football clubs

Club	Stadium
AFC Hornchurch	Hornchurch Stadium
AFC Wimbledon	Kingsmeadow (groundshare with Kingstonian)
Ashford Town (Middlesex)	Short Lane
Billericay Town	New Lodge
Boreham Wood	Meadow Park
Carshalton Athletic	War Memorial Sports Ground
Chelmsford City	Melbourne Stadium
East Thurrock United	Rookery Hill
Folkestone Invicta	Cheriton Road
Harlow Town	Barrows Farm
Harrow Borough	Earlsmead Stadium
Hastings United	The Pilot Field
Hendon	Claremont Road
Heybridge Swifts	Scraley Road
Horsham	Queen Street
Leyton	Leyton Stadium
Maidstone United	Bourne Park (groundshare with Sittingbourne)
Margate	Hartsdown Park
Ramsgate	Southwood Stadium
Staines Town	Wheatsheaf Park
Tonbridge Angels	Longmead Stadium
Wealdstone	Chestnut Avenue (groundshare with Northwood)

== Division One North ==
Isthmian League Division One North
- Season: 2007–08
- Champions: Dartford
- Promoted: Canvey Island; Dartford
- Relegated: Wivenhoe Town
- Matches: 462
- Goals: 1,452 (3.14 per match)
- Top goalscorer: 32 goals – John Frendo (Ware)
- Highest attendance: 2,589 – Dartford – Wingate & Finchley, (26 April)
- Total attendance: 87,419
- Average attendance: 189 (+20.4% to previous season)

Division One North consisted of 22 clubs, including 18 clubs from the previous season, and four new clubs:

- Brentwood Town, promoted as champions of the Essex Senior League
- Dartford, transferred from Division One South
- Edgware Town, promoted as champions of the Spartan South Midlands League
- Northwood, relegated from the Southern Football League Premier Division

Dartford won the division and were promoted to the Premier Division along with play-off winners Canvey Island. Wivenhoe Town finished bottom of the table and left the league. Ilford finished in the relegation zone for the second season in a row, but were reprieved again after Edgware Town resigned from the league at the end of the season due to lack of the funds.

=== League table ===
Pos	Team	Pld	W	D	L	GF	GA	GD	Pts	Promotion or relegation
1	Dartford	42	27	8	7	107	42	+65	89	Promoted to the Premier Division
2	AFC Sudbury	42	24	8	10	86	40	+46	80	Qualified for the play-offs, then transferred to SFL Division One Midlands
3	Redbridge	42	24	9	9	70	43	+27	80 (Note: Redbridge were deducted one point for fielding an ineligible player against Canvey Island on 22 September 2007 (1–1).)	Qualified for the play-offs
4	Ware	42	23	10	9	110	58	+52	79	Qualified for the play-offs
5	Canvey Island	42	23	10	9	82	39	+43	79	Qualified for the play-offs, then promoted to the Premier Division
6	Brentwood Town	42	22	11	9	70	49	+21	77	
7	Bury Town	42	22	9	11	76	53	+23	75	Transferred to SFL Division One Midlands
8	Edgware Town	42	20	14	8	53	39	+14	74	Resigned from the league
9	Maldon Town	42	19	10	13	78	63	+15	67	
10	Northwood	42	18	12	12	71	61	+10	66	
11	Aveley	42	18	12	12	68	65	+3	66	
12	Enfield Town	42	18	9	15	60	63	−3	63	
13	Great Wakering Rovers	42	13	9	20	64	66	−2	48	
14	Waltham Abbey	42	12	10	20	42	78	−36	46	
15	Arlesey Town	42	12	9	21	64	84	−20	45	Transferred to SFL Division One Midlands
16	Witham Town	42	12	5	25	75	109	−34	41	
17	Potters Bar Town	42	10	9	23	45	77	−32	39	
18	Wingate & Finchley	42	8	11	23	45	72	−27	35	
19	Waltham Forest	42	7	12	23	44	74	−30	33	
20	Tilbury	42	7	12	23	49	96	−47	32 (Note: Tilbury were deducted one point for fielding a suspended player against Wivenhoe Town on 29 March 2008 (0–0).)	
21	Ilford	42	8	8	26	47	95	−48	32	Reprieved from relegation
22	Wivenhoe Town	42	8	7	27	46	86	−40	31	Relegated to the Eastern Counties League

Rules for classification: 1) points; 2) goal difference; 3) number of goals scored.

==== Top scorers ====
Player	Club	Goals
John Frendo	Ware	32
Brendon Cass	Dartford	31
James Rowe	AFC Sudbury	27
Sam Reed	Bury Town	22
Cody McDonald	Witham Town	21

=== Play-offs ===
Semifinals
2	AFC Sudbury	2
5	Canvey Island	3
3	Redbridge	4
4	Ware	2

Final
5	Canvey Island	1(5)
3	Redbridge	1(4)

=== Stadia and locations ===
Locations of Division One North clubs
Greater London Division One North clubs

Club	Stadium
AFC Sudbury	King's Marsh
Arlesey Town	Hitchin Road
Aveley	The Mill Field
Brentwood Town	The Brentwood Centre Arena
Bury Town	Ram Meadow
Canvey Island	Brockwell Stadium
Dartford	Princes Park
Edgware Town	White Lion
Enfield Town	Goldsdown Road (groundshare with Brimsdown Rovers)
Great Wakering Rovers	Burroughs Park
Ilford	Cricklefield Stadium
Maldon Town	Wallace Binder Ground
Northwood	Chestnut Avenue (groundshare with Wealdstone)
Potters Bar Town	Parkfield
Redbridge	Oakside
Tilbury	Chadfields
Waltham Abbey	Capershotts
Waltham Forest	Wadham Lodge
Ware	Wodson Park
Wingate & Finchley	The Harry Abrahams Stadium
Witham Town	Spa Road
Wivenhoe Town	Broad Lane

== Division One South ==
Isthmian League Division One South
- Season: 2007–08
- Champions: Dover Athletic
- Promoted: Dover Athletic; Tooting & Mitcham United
- Relegated: Horsham YMCA; Molesey
- Matches: 462
- Goals: 1,380 (2.99 per match)
- Top goalscorer: 26 goals – Craig Carley (Metropolitan Police)
- Highest attendance: 1,324 – Dover Athletic – Ashford Town (Kent), (26 April)
- Total attendance: 105,939
- Average attendance: 229 (-20.2% to previous season)

Division One South consisted of 22 clubs, including 17 clubs from the previous season, and five new clubs:

- Chipstead, promoted as champions of the Combined Counties League
- Eastbourne Town, promoted as champions of the Sussex County League
- Walton & Hersham, relegated from the Premier Division
- Whitstable Town, promoted as champions of the Kent League
- Worthing, relegated from the Premier Division

Dover Athletic won the division and were promoted to the Premier Division along with play-off winners Tooting & Mitcham United. Horsham YMCA and Molesey finished bottom of the table and left the league.

=== League table ===
Pos	Team	Pld	W	D	L	GF	GA	GD	Pts	Promotion or relegation
1	Dover Athletic	42	30	8	4	84	29	+55	98	Promoted to the Premier Division
2	Tooting & Mitcham United	42	26	8	8	88	41	+47	86	Qualified for the play-offs, then promoted to the Premier Division
3	Cray Wanderers	42	25	11	6	87	42	+45	86	Qualified for the play-offs
4	Metropolitan Police	42	24	3	15	69	47	+22	75	Qualified for the play-offs
5	Worthing	42	22	7	13	77	49	+28	73	Qualified for the play-offs
6	Dulwich Hamlet	42	20	10	12	68	47	+21	70	
7	Kingstonian	42	20	10	12	66	52	+14	70	
8	Ashford Town (Kent)	42	19	10	13	64	51	+13	67	
9	Sittingbourne	42	20	7	15	56	58	−2	67	
10	Walton & Hersham	42	15	12	15	65	62	+3	57	
11	Whyteleafe	42	17	5	20	57	62	−5	56	
12	Burgess Hill Town	42	18	8	16	61	57	+4	54 (Note: Burgess Hill Town were deducted eight points for fielding a player without international clearance in eight matches.)	
13	Croydon Athletic	42	14	9	19	65	76	−11	51	
14	Whitstable Town	42	14	8	20	69	84	−15	50	
15	Chipstead	42	15	5	22	58	76	−18	50	
16	Walton Casuals	42	11	15	16	55	68	−13	48	
17	Leatherhead	42	13	7	22	52	63	−11	46	
18	Chatham Town	42	12	10	20	58	70	−12	46	Transferred to Division One North
19	Eastbourne Town	42	11	11	20	58	84	−26	44	
20	Corinthian-Casuals	42	11	11	20	51	77	−26	44	
21	Horsham YMCA	42	7	6	29	36	85	−49	27	Relegated to the Sussex County League
22	Molesey	42	3	9	30	36	100	−64	18	Relegated to the Combined Counties League

Rules for classification: 1) points; 2) goal difference; 3) number of goals scored.

==== Top scorers ====
Player	Club	Goals
Craig Carley	Metropolitan Police	26
Liam Bairup	Eastbourne Town	23
Steve Harper	Burgess Hill Town	22
Jon Henry-Hayden	Tooting & Mitcham United	21
Bobby Traynor	Kingstonian	19
James Dryden	Dover Athletic	19
Paul Vines	Tooting & Mitcham United	19

=== Play-offs ===
Semifinals
2	Tooting & Mitcham United	2
5	Worthing	0
3	Cray Wanderers	2
4	Metropolitan Police	0

Final
2	Tooting & Mitcham United	1
3	Cray Wanderers	0

=== Stadia and locations ===
Locations of Division One South clubs
Greater London Division One South clubs

Club	Stadium
Ashford Town (Kent)	The Homelands
Burgess Hill Town	Leylands Park
Chatham Town	The Sports Ground
Chipstead	High Road
Corinthian-Casuals	King George's Field
Cray Wanderers	Hayes Lane (groundshare with Bromley)
Croydon Athletic	Keith Tuckey Stadium
Dover Athletic	Crabble Athletic Ground
Dulwich Hamlet	Champion Hill
Eastbourne Town	The Saffrons
Horsham YMCA	Gorings Mead
Kingstonian	Kingsmeadow (groundshare with AFC Wimbledon)
Leatherhead	Fetcham Grove
Metropolitan Police	Imber Court
Molesey	Walton Road Stadium
Sittingbourne	Bourne Park
Tooting & Mitcham United	Imperial Fields
Walton & Hersham	The Sports Ground
Walton Casuals	Waterside Stadium
Whitstable Town	The Belmont Ground
Whyteleafe	Church Road
Worthing	Woodside Road

== League Cup ==
2007–08 Isthmian League Cup
Tournament details
- Country: England
- Teams: 66

Final positions
- Champions: Ramsgate
- Runners-up: AFC Sudbury

The Isthmian League Cup 2007–08 was the 34th season of the Isthmian League Cup, the league cup competition of the Isthmian League. Sixty-six clubs took part. The competition commenced on 11 September 2007 and finished on 2 April 2008.

=== Calendar ===
Round	Dates	Matches	Clubs
First round	11 September	2	66 → 64
Second round	1 October – 20 November	32	64 → 32
Third round	23 October – 8 January	16	32 → 16
Fourth round	4 December – 12 February	8	16 → 8
Quarterfinals	12 February – 19 February	4	8 → 4
Semifinals	4 March	2	4 → 2
Final	2 April	1	2 → 1

=== Fixtures and results ===
Fixtures are listed in alphabetical order, not that which they were drawn in.

==== First round ====
Four clubs from division Ones participated in the first round, while all other clubs received a bye to the second round.

Tie	Home team (tier)	Score	Away team (tier)	Att.
1	Redbridge	2–0	Brentwood Town	81
2	Waltham Forest	2–3	Arlesey Town	53

==== Second round ====
The two clubs to have made it through the first round were entered into the second round draw with all other Isthmian League clubs, making sixty-four teams.

Tie	Home team (tier)	Score	Away team (tier)	Att.
3	AFC Wimbledon	0–2	Whyteleafe	529
4	AFC Hornchurch	3–0	Tilbury	182
5	Arlesey Town	4–0	Enfield Town	75
6	Ashford Town (Middx)	2–1	Walton & Hersham	93
7	Ashford Town (Kent)	1–3	Burgess Hill Town	110
8	Billericay Town	0–3	AFC Sudbury	202
9	Bury Town	2–3	Chelmsford City	206
10	Carshalton Athletic	4–0	Corinthian-Casuals	75
11	Dartford	3–0	Aveley	318
12	Dover Athletic	2–3 (a.e.t.)	Eastbourne Town	151
13	Dulwich Hamlet	0–0	Tooting & Mitcham United	149
Tooting & Mitcham United advance 5–3 on penalties
14	Edgware Town	3–1	Staines Town	48
15	Great Wakering Rovers	4–1	Ilford	115
16	Harlow Town	1–3 (a.e.t.)	Ware	131
17	Harrow Borough	0–5	Metropolitan Police	76
18	Hendon	2–3	Boreham Wood	101

Tie	Home team (tier)	Score	Away team (tier)	Att.
19	Horsham	4–0	Hastings United	162
20	Horsham YMCA	4–3 (a.e.t.)	Folkestone Invicta	50
21	Kingstonian	3–1	Cray Wanderers	179
22	Leatherhead	3–2	Croydon Athletic	67
23	Maidstone United	5–2	Canvey Island	131
24	Margate	2–3	East Thurrock United	174
25	Molesey	2–3	Wealdstone	106
26	Potters Bar Town	3–1	Leyton	41
27	Ramsgate	4–2	Chatham Town	87
28	Redbridge	2–1	Sittingbourne	41
29	Tonbridge Angels	4–1	Chipstead	159
30	Waltham Abbey	3–1	Wingate & Finchley	41
31	Walton Casuals	1–0	Northwood	34
32	Whitstable Town	4–3	Worthing	110
33	Witham Town	1–0	Maldon Town	87
34	Wivenhoe Town	0–2	Heybridge Swifts	44

==== Third round ====
Tie	Home team (tier)	Score	Away team (tier)	Att.
35	AFC Hornchurch	3–0	Maidsone United	225
36	AFC Sudbury	2–1	Chelmsford City	297
37	Arlesey Town	4–2	Witham Town	63
38	Ashford Town (Middx)	2–0	Metropolitan Police	88
39	Boreham Wood	2–3	Wealdstone	87
40	Burgess Hill Town	1–3	Whyteleafe	103
41	Carshalton Athletic	1–0	Leatherhead	160
42	Dartford	3–0	Whitstable Town	426
43	East Thurrock United	0–1	Ramsgate	63

Tie	Home team (tier)	Score	Away team (tier)	Att.
44	Eastbourne Town	1–5	Horsham	137
45	Kingstonian	1–2 (a.e.t.)	Tooting & Mitcham United	225
46	Potters Bar Town	1–4	Edgware Town	42
47	Redbridge	2–1	Great Wakering Rovers	56
48	Tonbridge Angels	4–2 (a.e.t.)	Horsham YMCA	153
49	Waltham Abbey	0–4	Heybridge Swifts	62
Played at Heybridge Swifts
50	Walton Casuals	2–1	Ware	39

==== Fourth round ====
Tie	Home team (tier)	Score	Away team (tier)	Att.
51	AFC Hornchurch	1–2	Ramsgate	216
52	Arlesey Town	1–4	Edgware Town	79
53	Heybridge Swifts	3–0	Dartford	152
54	Horsham	1–2	Walton Casuals	187

Tie	Home team (tier)	Score	Away team (tier)	Att.
55	Redbridge	0–1 (a.e.t.)	AFC Sudbury	76
56	Tonbridge Angels	1–3	Carshalton Athletic	202
57	Tooting & Mitcham United	1–0	Whyteleafe	105
58	Wealdstone	1–0	Ashford Town (Middx)	88

==== Quarterfinals ====
Tie	Home team (tier)	Score	Away team (tier)	Att.
59	AFC Sudbury	1–0	Edgware Town	176
60	Carshalton Athletic	1–1	Walton Casuals	95
Walton Casuals advance 5–4 on penalties

Tie	Home team (tier)	Score	Away team (tier)	Att.
61	Ramsgate	1–1	Tooting & Mitcham United	182
Ramsgate advance 4–3 on penalties
62	Wealdstone	0–1 (a.e.t.)	Heybridge Swifts	105

==== Semifinals ====
Tie	Home team (tier)	Score	Away team (tier)	Att.
63	Heybridge Swifts	0–6	AFC Sudbury	189
64	Walton Casuals	0–1	Ramsgate	132

==== Final ====
2 April 2008

AFC Sudbury (P)	0–0 (a.e.t.)	Ramsgate (S)
Penalties
	4–5

Princes Park, Dartford
Attendance: 568

== See also ==
- Isthmian League
- 2007–08 Northern Premier League
- 2007–08 Southern Football League
