= 2007–08 Essex Senior Football League =

The 2007–08 season was the 37th in the history of Essex Senior Football League a football competition in England.

The league featured 15 clubs which competed in the league last season, along with two new clubs:

- Enfield 1893, new club formed after Enfield folded
- Mauritius Sports & Pennant, promoted from the Middlesex County League

Concord Rangers were champions, winning their third Essex Senior League title and were promoted to the Isthmian League for the first time in their history.

== League table ==
Essex Senior Football League
- Season: 2007–08
- Champions: Concord Rangers
- Promoted: Concord Rangers
- Matches: 272
- Goals: 931 (3.42 per match)

Pos	Team	Pld	W	D	L	GF	GA	GD	Pts	Promotion or relegation
1	Concord Rangers	32	25	2	5	94	26	+68	77	Promoted to the Isthmian League
2	Enfield 1893	32	24	5	3	88	29	+59	77	
3	Barkingside	32	24	2	6	79	25	+54	74	
4	Eton Manor	32	20	5	7	81	44	+37	65	
5	Romford	32	19	7	6	75	41	+34	64	
6	Southend Manor	32	18	4	10	50	31	+19	58	
7	Bowers & Pitsea	32	17	5	10	57	41	+16	56	
8	Burnham Ramblers	32	15	7	10	69	45	+24	52	
9	Barking	32	14	6	12	54	43	+11	48	
10	Stansted	32	10	8	14	50	50	0	38	
11	Clapton	32	8	9	15	38	57	−19	33	
12	Sawbridgeworth Town	32	8	4	20	34	69	−35	28	
13	Mauritius Sports & Pennant	32	7	5	20	41	70	−29	26	
14	Hullbridge Sports	32	4	12	16	35	66	−31	24	
15	Beaumont Athletic	32	6	3	23	36	113	−77	21	Resigned to the Essex Olympian League
16	Basildon United	32	3	8	21	26	82	−56	17	
17	London APSA	32	2	4	26	24	99	−75	10	

Source: fchd
Rules for classification: 1) points; 2) goal difference; 3) number of goals scored.
