= 2006–07 Essex Senior Football League =

The 2006–07 season was the 36th in the history of Essex Senior Football League, a football competition in England.

The league featured 13 clubs which competed in the league last season, along with three new clubs:

- Barking, new club formed after Barking & East Ham United folded
- Beaumont Athletic, joined from the Essex Business League
- Clapton, joined from the Isthmian League

Brentwood Town were champions, winning their second Essex Senior League title and were promoted to the Isthmian League.

== League table ==
Essex Senior Football League
- Season: 2006–07
- Champions: Brentwood Town
- Promoted: Brentwood Town
- Matches: 240
- Goals: 818 (3.41 per match)

Pos	Team	Pld	W	D	L	GF	GA	GD	Pts	Promotion or relegation
1	Brentwood Town	30	22	6	2	74	21	+53	72	Promoted to the Isthmian League
2	Romford	30	20	6	4	75	32	+43	66	
3	Barkingside	30	17	7	6	61	28	+33	58	
4	Bowers & Pitsea	30	16	7	7	65	33	+32	55	
5	Burnham Ramblers	30	17	4	9	59	29	+30	55	
6	Barking	30	16	7	7	65	43	+22	55	
7	Concord Rangers	30	16	6	8	67	42	+25	54	
8	Sawbridgeworth Town	30	14	6	10	60	35	+25	48	
9	Southend Manor	30	13	7	10	45	35	+10	46	
10	Basildon United	30	11	9	10	44	40	+4	42	
11	Eton Manor	30	9	7	14	52	57	−5	34	
12	Hullbridge Sports	30	5	8	17	27	61	−34	23	
13	London APSA	30	5	6	19	29	69	−40	21	
14	Clapton	30	5	5	20	34	56	−22	20	
15	Beaumont Athletic	30	4	3	23	41	132	−91	15	
16	Stansted	30	1	4	25	20	105	−85	7	

Source: fchd
Rules for classification: 1) points; 2) goal difference; 3) number of goals scored.
