= George Skinner (footballer) =

English footballer and manager

Personal information
- Full name: George Edward Henry Skinner
- Date of birth: 26 June 1917
- Place of birth: Belvedere, England
- Date of death: 30 September 2002 (aged 85)
- Place of death: Eastbourne, England
- Position: Inside forward

Senior career*
Years	Team	Apps	(Gls)
- Callenders's Athletic
1938–1947	Tottenham Hotspur	1	(0)
- Gillingham
- Brighton & Hove Albion
- Hastings United

Managerial career
- 1954–1959: Eastbourne
- 1965: Libya
- 1968: Jordan
- 1969: Saudi Arabia
- 1972: Iran
- 1976–1978: IBV
- * Club domestic league appearances and goals

George Edward Henry Skinner (26 June 1917 – 30 September 2002) was an English professional footballer who played for Tottenham Hotspur, Northfleet United, Gillingham, Brighton & Hove Albion and Hastings United.

== Playing career ==
Skinner began his career at Callender's Cables works team, Callender's Athletic of the Spartan League. The inside forward signed for Tottenham Hotspur in May 1937 before joining the club's "nursery team" Northfleet United. Skinner signed professional forms with the Spurs in September 1938. At the onset of WW2 he joined the Royal Artillery and was a war time guest player at clubs including Charlton Athletic, Fulham, Harlepool, Middlesbrough, Swindon Town, York City and Bristol Rovers. Skinner made one senior appearance for the Lilywhites in a fixture versus Birmingham City in August 1946. After leaving White Hart Lane in July 1947 he had spells with Gillingham and Brighton & Hove Albion.

== Coaching and management career ==
After gaining a full coaching badge from the Football Association in 1947, Skinner took up his first overseas post as an adviser to the Finland before taking up the position of player/coach at Hastings United. After four years with the South Coast club he became Kent FA chief coach before returning to Finland to take charge of the Finland Olympic team. Skinner returned to England as manager of Eastbourne Town from 1954 until 1959 and later held the post of chief coach of the Sussex FA.

In 1962 he travelled abroad to coach in Nigeria before becoming the national team coach of countries including Libya (1965), Jordan (1968) and Saudi Arabia (1969). He took the appointment of national coach with Frank O'Farrell of Iran in 1972. His last managerial position overseas was with Icelandic club IBV in 1976. Under his charge the club became the countries first club to progress past the first round of the UEFA Cup in 1978, after knocking out Glentoran. He retired from football in 1978 and settled in Pevensey Bay. He died on 30 September 2002 at an Eastbourne nursing home.
