= Alex White (footballer) =

Scottish footballer (1916–1995)

Personal information
- Full name: Alex White
- Date of birth: 28 January 1916
- Place of birth: Armadale, Scotland
- Date of death: 3 November 1995 (aged 79)
- Place of death: Armadale, Scotland
- Height: 5 ft 7 in (1.70 m)
- Position: Right back

Senior career*
Years	Team	Apps	(Gls)
- Westrigg United
- Bonnyrigg Rose
1937–1948	Chelsea	18	(0)
1948–1950	Swindon Town	38	(0)
- Southport

Managerial career
- 1953: Uxbridge
- 1954: Eastbourne
- * Club domestic league appearances and goals

Alexander White (28 January 1916 – 3 November 1995) was a Scottish professional football right back who played in the Football League for Chelsea, and Swindon Town.

== Playing career ==
White was born in Armadale, Scotland. He started his football career with Westrigg United and Bonnyrigg Rose Athletic F.C. before signing for Chelsea in 1937. He was 30 years old when he started his first team game against Leeds United on 14 September 1946 (Chelsea won 3–0). White made a further 18 appearances for Chelsea; his last game on 1 January 1948 was a draw with Blackburn Rovers.

In July 1948 he transferred to Swindon Town in the Third Division, making 38 appearances before joining Southport in July 1950.

== Coaching career ==
White managed Uxbridge F.C. in London in 1953 before going to Eastbourne in 1954.

== Career statistics ==
Appearances and goals by club, season and competition
Club	Season	League			FA Cup		League Cup		Other		Total	
Club	Season	Division	Apps	Goals	Apps	Goals	Apps	Goals	Apps	Goals	Apps	Goals
Chelsea	1946-47	First Division	17	0	1	0	—		—		14	0
Chelsea	1947-48	First Division	4	0	0	0	—		—		4	0
Chelsea	Total		17	0	1	0	—		—		18	0
Swindon Town	1948-49	Third Division South	29	0	1	0	—		—		30	0
Swindon Town	1949-50	Third Division South	6	0	2	0	—		—		8	0
Swindon Town	Total		35	0	3	0	—		—		38	0
Career total			52	0	4	0	—		—		56	0
