= William Grevett =

English cricketer

Personal information
- Full name: William Sydney Gordon Grevett
- Born: 25 October 1892; Eastbourne, Sussex, England
- Died: 26 July 1967 (aged 74); Eastbourne, Sussex, England
- Relatives: Robert Grevett (nephew)

Domestic team information
- Years: Team
- 1922: Sussex

Career statistics
Competition	First-class
Matches	1
Runs scored	13
Batting average	6.50
100s/50s	0/0
Top score	9
Catches/stumpings	0/–
- Source: Cricinfo, 13 April 2020
Association football career
- Position: Half-back
Senior career*
Years	Team	Apps	(Gls)
1908–1925	Eastbourne	123	(8)
Managerial career
- 1931–1939: Eastbourne
- * Club domestic league appearances and goals

William Sydney Gordon Grevett (25 October 1892 – 26 July 1967) was an English cricketer and footballer.

== Cricket career ==
Grevett made a single first-class appearance for Sussex against Glamorgan at the County Cricket Ground, Hove, in 1922. Sussex won the toss and elected to bat, scoring 261 in their first-innings with Grevett, who batted at number five, scoring four runs. In response, Glamorgan made 173 in their first-innings. Sussex made 255 in their second-innings, with Grevett contributing with nine runs. In both innings he was dismissed by Johnnie Clay. Glamorgan was left with a target of 344 to win. However, they could only make 142 in their second-innings chase, giving victory to Sussex by 201 runs. This was his only major appearance for Sussex.

Grevett played club cricket for Eastbourne from 1931 to 1938.

== Football career ==
Grevett also played Amateur Football for Eastbourne F.C. between 1908 and 1925. Playing in the Southern Amateur League and made 194 appearances. In 1931 he became manager for Eastbourne FC for 8 years, making another league appearance in 1935.

== Personal life ==
William was enlisted into the Royal Air Force in 1915

He died at Eastbourne, Sussex, on 26 July 1967 aged 74. His nephew, Robert Grevett, also played a single first-class match for Sussex.

== Honours ==
=== Player ===
- AFA Senior Cup: 1921–22. 1924–25
- Challenge International du Nord: 1909
- Eastbourne Charity Cup: 1909–10
- Southern Amateur League Division 1: 1922–23
- Sussex Senior Cup: 1921–22

=== Manager ===
- Sussex RUR Cup: 1932–33
- Sussex Senior Cup: 1931–32, 1932–33
