= Robert Grevett =

English cricketer

Personal information
- Full name: Robert Gordon Grevett
- Born: 24 November 1914; Eastbourne, Sussex, England
- Died: 5 March 2004 (aged 89); Chertsey, Surrey, England
- Batting: Right-handed
- Bowling: Right-arm off break
- Relatives: William Grevett (uncle)

Domestic team information
- Years: Team
- 1939: Sussex

Career statistics
Competition	First-class
Matches	1
Runs scored	0
Batting average	0.00
100s/50s	0/0
Top score	0
Catches/stumpings	0/–
- Source: Cricinfo, 14 March 2012

Robert Gordon Grevett (24 November 1914 – 5 March 2004) was an English cricketer. Grevett was a right-handed batsman who bowled right-arm off break. He was born in Eastbourne, Sussex.

Grevett made a single first-class appearance for Sussex against Oxford University at The Saffrons, Eastbourne, in 1939. Oxford University won the toss and elected to bat, scoring 178 in their first innings. In response, Sussex made 169 in their first innings, with Grevett, who batted at number three, being dismissed for a duck by David Macindoe. Oxford University made 324 in their second innings, leaving Sussex with a target of 334 to win. However, Sussex could only make 277 in their second-innings chase, with Grevett once again dismissed for a duck, this time off the bowling of Algernon Marsham. This was his only major appearance for Sussex.

He died at Chertsey, Surrey, on 5 March 2004. His uncle, William Grevett, also played a single first-class match for Sussex.

== Background ==
Robert Gordon Grevett was born on 24 November 1914 in Eastbourne. He came from a family long established in the area, with several generations living in Eastbourne. Among his relatives was William Sydney Gordon Grevett (25 October 1892 - 26 July 1967), who played a single first-class match for Sussex in 1922.
