= 2006–07 Sussex County Football League =

The 2006–07 Sussex County Football League season was the 82nd in the history of Sussex County Football League a football competition in England.

== Division One ==
Sussex County Football League Division One
- Season: 2006–07
- Champions: Eastbourne Town
- Promoted: Eastbourne Town
- Relegated: Littlehampton Town
- Matches: 380
- Goals: 1,170 (3.08 per match)

Division One featured 18 clubs which competed in the division last season, along with two new clubs, promoted from Division Two:

- Oakwood
- Selsey

Also, Rye & Iden United changed name to Rye United.

=== League table ===
Pos	Team	Pld	W	D	L	GF	GA	GD	Pts	Qualification or relegation
1	Eastbourne Town	38	27	6	5	97	42	+55	87	Promoted to the Isthmian League Division One South
2	Whitehawk	38	25	11	2	70	17	+53	86	
3	Arundel	38	23	6	9	82	39	+43	75	
4	Crowborough Athletic	38	22	9	7	73	40	+33	75	
5	Hassocks	38	20	8	10	80	45	+35	68	
6	Hailsham Town	38	17	15	6	52	29	+23	66	
7	Eastbourne United Association	38	16	9	13	66	51	+15	57	
8	Selsey	38	14	14	10	46	46	0	56	
9	Ringmer	38	13	11	14	59	66	−7	52 (Note: Ringmer were awarded two points.)	
10	East Preston	38	16	3	19	47	49	−2	51	
11	Chichester City United	38	14	7	17	59	58	+1	49	
12	Three Bridges	38	11	12	15	59	60	−1	45	
13	Shoreham	38	11	10	17	61	71	−10	43	
14	Sidley United	38	11	9	18	47	76	−29	42	
15	Redhill	38	11	8	19	61	65	−4	41	
16	Wick	38	11	7	20	51	69	−18	39 (Note: Wick were deducted one point.)	
17	Oakwood	38	11	6	21	42	79	−37	39	
18	Worthing United	38	7	10	21	55	100	−45	31	
19	Rye United	38	6	9	23	33	73	−40	27	
20	Littlehampton Town	38	5	8	25	30	95	−65	23	Relegated to Division Two

Source: nonleaguematters
Rules for classification: 1) points; 2) goal difference; 3) number of goals scored.

== Division Two ==
Sussex County Football League Division Two
- Season: 2006–07
- Champions: Pagham
- Promoted: Pagham; St Francis Rangers
- Relegated: Saltdean United
- Matches: 306
- Goals: 979 (3.2 per match)

Division Two featured 15 clubs which competed in the division last season, along with three new clubs:

- Lingfield, promoted from Division Three
- Peacehaven & Telscombe, promoted from Division Three
- Southwick, relegated from Division One

=== League table ===
Pos	Team	Pld	W	D	L	GF	GA	GD	Pts	Qualification or relegation
1	Pagham	34	22	4	8	68	35	+33	70	Promoted to Division One
2	St Francis Rangers	34	18	4	12	64	46	+18	60 (Note: St Francis Rangers were awarded two points.)	Promoted to Division One
3	Westfield	34	17	8	9	59	42	+17	59	
4	Wealden	34	18	4	12	76	49	+27	58	
5	Peacehaven & Telscombe	34	17	7	10	60	61	−1	58	
6	Seaford Town	34	16	7	11	54	46	+8	55	
7	Midhurst & Easebourne	34	15	7	12	82	65	+17	52	
8	Steyning Town	34	16	4	14	60	53	+7	52	
9	Mile Oak	34	15	5	14	59	60	−1	50	
10	Lingfield	34	14	3	17	43	49	−6	45	
11	East Grinstead Town	34	12	8	14	48	47	+1	44	
12	Sidlesham	34	11	10	13	56	63	−7	43	
13	Southwick	34	10	11	13	43	56	−13	41	
14	Lancing	34	10	8	16	40	57	−17	38	
15	Storrington	34	11	5	18	43	63	−20	38	
16	Crawley Down	34	10	7	17	49	57	−8	37	
17	Broadbridge Heath	34	8	10	16	34	53	−19	33 (Note: Broadbridge Heath were deducted one point.)	
18	Saltdean United	34	7	6	21	41	77	−36	27	Relegated to Division Three

Source: nonleaguematters
Rules for classification: 1) points; 2) goal difference; 3) number of goals scored.

== Division Three ==
Sussex County Football League Division Three
- Season: 2006–07
- Champions: Rustington
- Promoted: Rustington; Pease Pottage Village
- Matches: 156
- Goals: 533 (3.42 per match)

Division Three featured ten clubs which competed in the division last season, along with three new clubs:

- Bexhill United, relegated from Division Two
- Loxwood, joined from the West Sussex League
- Rottingdean Village, joined from the Brighton, Hove & District Football League

=== League table ===
Pos	Team	Pld	W	D	L	GF	GA	GD	Pts	Qualification or relegation
1	Rustington	24	18	3	3	65	21	+44	57	Promoted to Division Two
2	Pease Pottage Village	24	13	5	6	46	31	+15	46	Promoted to Division Two
3	Little Common	24	13	4	7	46	39	+7	43	
4	Rottingdean Village	24	12	5	7	39	34	+5	41	
5	Forest	24	11	4	9	42	41	+1	37	
6	Haywards Heath Town	24	11	3	10	34	30	+4	35	
7	Loxwood	24	10	4	10	37	38	−1	34	
8	Ifield Edwards	24	10	2	12	33	38	−5	32	
9	Newhaven	24	9	5	10	38	45	−7	32	
10	Uckfield Town	24	9	4	11	47	48	−1	31	
11	Bexhill United	24	7	3	14	49	55	−6	24	
12	Hurstpierpoint	24	7	3	14	28	43	−15	24	
13	Bosham	24	2	3	19	29	70	−41	9	

Source: nonleaguematters
Rules for classification: 1) points; 2) goal difference; 3) number of goals scored.
