= 2007–08 Sussex County Football League =

The 2007–08 Sussex County Football League season was the 83rd in the history of Sussex County Football League a football competition in England.

== Division One ==
Sussex County Football League Division One
- Season: 2007–08
- Champions: Crowborough Athletic
- Promoted: Crowborough Athletic
- Relegated: Rye United; Sidley United
- Matches: 380
- Goals: 1,260 (3.32 per match)

Division One featured 18 clubs which competed in the division last season, along with two new clubs, promoted from Division Two:

- Pagham
- St Francis Rangers

=== League table ===
Pos	Team	Pld	W	D	L	GF	GA	GD	Pts	Qualification or relegation
1	Crowborough Athletic	38	30	5	3	99	33	+66	95	Promoted to the Isthmian League Division One South
2	Whitehawk	38	21	12	5	61	34	+27	75	
3	Arundel	38	21	10	7	90	49	+41	70 (Note: Arundel were deducted three points.)	
4	East Preston	38	19	10	9	48	40	+8	67	
5	Wick	38	19	7	12	77	55	+22	64	
6	Three Bridges	38	17	9	12	74	60	+14	60	
7	Hassocks	38	15	13	10	57	46	+11	58	
8	Redhill	38	16	8	14	59	56	+3	56	
9	Pagham	38	15	8	15	60	55	+5	53	
10	Ringmer	38	14	9	15	81	73	+8	51	
11	Eastbourne United Association	38	14	8	16	67	62	+5	50	
12	Shoreham	38	12	14	12	54	50	+4	50	
13	Hailsham Town	38	13	11	14	54	58	−4	50	
14	St Francis Rangers	38	13	7	18	56	62	−6	45 (Note: St Francis Rangers were deducted one point.)	
15	Selsey	38	10	12	16	67	72	−5	42	
16	Chichester City United	38	11	4	23	66	100	−34	39 (Note: Chichester City United were awarded two points.)	
17	Worthing United	38	8	8	22	53	84	−31	35 (Note: Worthing United were awarded three points.)	
18	Oakwood	38	7	12	19	52	85	−33	33	
19	Rye United	38	8	6	24	46	86	−40	30	Relegated to Division Two
20	Sidley United	38	8	5	25	39	100	−61	29	Relegated to Division Two

Source: nonleaguematters
Rules for classification: 1) points; 2) goal difference; 3) number of goals scored.

== Division Two ==
Sussex County Football League Division Two
- Season: 2007–08
- Champions: East Grinstead Town
- Promoted: East Grinstead Town; Lingfield
- Relegated: Broadbridge Heath; Pease Pottage Village
- Matches: 306
- Goals: 1,134 (3.71 per match)

Division Two featured 15 clubs which competed in the division last season, along with three new clubs:

- Littlehampton Town, relegated from Division One
- Pease Pottage Village, promoted from Division Three
- Rustington, promoted from Division Three

=== League table ===
Pos	Team	Pld	W	D	L	GF	GA	GD	Pts	Qualification or relegation
1	East Grinstead Town	34	26	6	2	89	41	+48	84	Promoted to Division One
2	Lingfield	34	20	6	8	73	40	+33	66	Promoted to Division One
3	Rustington	34	19	8	7	70	29	+41	65	
4	Peacehaven & Telscombe	34	20	5	9	93	59	+34	65	
5	Mile Oak	34	17	8	9	79	56	+23	59	
6	Crawley Down	34	19	1	14	59	60	−1	58	
7	Westfield	34	18	3	13	71	64	+7	57	
8	Littlehampton Town	34	16	5	13	66	54	+12	53	
9	Wealden	34	14	7	13	69	56	+13	49	
10	Midhurst & Easebourne	34	15	4	15	52	67	−15	49	
11	Steyning Town	34	12	6	16	51	53	−2	42	
12	Lancing	34	10	8	16	64	61	+3	38	
13	Sidlesham	34	11	5	18	61	65	−4	38	
14	Southwick	34	11	5	18	44	62	−18	38	
15	Seaford Town	34	12	1	21	61	79	−18	37	
16	Storrington	34	9	7	18	48	67	−19	34	
17	Broadbridge Heath	34	8	5	21	45	75	−30	29	Relegated to Division Three
18	Pease Pottage Village	34	3	2	29	39	146	−107	11	Relegated to Division Three

Source: nonleaguematters
Rules for classification: 1) points; 2) goal difference; 3) number of goals scored.

== Division Three ==
Sussex County Football League Division Three
- Season: 2007–08
- Champions: Loxwood
- Promoted: Loxwood; Bexhill United
- Matches: 156
- Goals: 542 (3.47 per match)

Division Three featured eleven clubs which competed in the division last season, along with two new clubs:

- Dorking Wanderers, joined from the West Sussex League
- Saltdean United, relegated from Division Two

=== League table ===
Pos	Team	Pld	W	D	L	GF	GA	GD	Pts	Qualification or relegation
1	Loxwood	24	15	4	5	51	26	+25	51 (Note: Loxwood were awarded two points.)	Promoted to Division Two
2	Bexhill United	24	15	6	3	60	35	+25	48 (Note: Bexhill United were deducted three points.)	Promoted to Division Two
3	Haywards Heath Town	24	12	7	5	45	26	+19	46 (Note: Haywards Heath Town were awarded three points.)	
4	Dorking Wanderers	24	12	7	5	58	47	+11	42 (Note: Dorking Wanderers were deducted one point.)	
5	Newhaven	24	10	7	7	52	42	+10	37	
6	Little Common	24	10	7	7	52	49	+3	37	
7	Rottingdean Village	24	9	5	10	36	36	0	32	
8	Ifield Edwards	24	8	6	10	42	53	−11	30	
9	Saltdean United	24	9	3	12	32	45	−13	30	
10	Bosham	24	7	2	15	35	45	−10	23	
11	Forest	24	6	5	13	26	39	−13	23	
12	Uckfield Town	24	6	3	15	28	37	−9	21	
13	Hurstpierpoint	24	4	4	16	25	62	−37	16	

Source: nonleaguematters
Rules for classification: 1) points; 2) goal difference; 3) number of goals scored.
