= 1939–40 Sussex County Football League =

Sussex County Football League
- Season: 1930–40
- Champions: Worthing
- Matches played: 182
- Goals scored: 605 (3.32 per match)

The 1939–40 Sussex County Football League season was the 20th in the history of the competition.

Due to the Second World War, a war-time emergency competition was announced and 16 teams were placed into two separate leagues, 8 teams in the Eastern Division and 8 in the Western Division. With the winners of each league playing in a play-off to decide the overall winner.

== Clubs ==
The league featured 16 clubs, 14 which competed in the last season, along with two new clubs:

- Hastings & St Leonards
- Eastbourne

== Eastern Division ==
=== League table ===
Pos	Team	Pld	W	D	L	GF	GA	GR	Pts	Qualification or relegation
1	Hastings & St Leonards	14	8	2	4	46	21	2.190	18	Division champions and then left the League
2	Haywards Heath	14	8	1	5	49	35	1.400	17	
3	Newhaven	14	6	4	4	32	26	1.231	16	
4	East Grinstead	14	5	5	4	40	32	1.250	15	
5	Bexhill	14	6	1	7	20	41	0.488	13	Left the League
6	Eastbourne	14	4	4	6	30	35	0.857	12	Left the League
7	Lewes	14	5	1	8	35	53	0.660	11	
8	Eastbourne Comrades	14	4	2	8	29	38	0.763	10	Left the League

Source: Sussex County league - Historic League Tables
Rules for classification: 1) points; 2) goal difference; 3) number of goals scored.
The points system until the 1982–83 season: 2 points for a win, 1 point for a draw and 0 points for losing.

== Western Division ==
=== League table ===
Pos	Team	Pld	W	D	L	GF	GA	GR	Pts	Qualification or relegation
1	Worthing	14	11	1	2	58	26	2.231	23	Division champions
2	Bognor Regis	14	10	0	4	47	26	1.808	20	
3	Horsham	14	9	1	4	55	27	2.037	19	
4	Southwick	14	8	1	5	48	37	1.297	17	
5	Littlehampton Town	14	7	0	7	41	40	1.025	14	
6	Hove	14	5	1	8	27	62	0.435	11	
7	Shoreham	14	2	1	11	33	52	0.635	5	
8	Chichester	14	1	1	12	15	54	0.278	3	Left the League

Source: Sussex County league - Historic League Tables
Rules for classification: 1) points; 2) goal difference; 3) number of goals scored.
The points system until the 1982–83 season: 2 points for a win, 1 point for a draw and 0 points for losing.

== Play-off Final ==
Worthing 1 — 0 Hastings & St Leonards
Source= Sussex County league - Historic League Tables
