= Beaumont Athletic F.C. =

Association football club in England

Beaumont Athletic
- Full name: Beaumont Athletic Football Club
- Nickname: The Athletics
- Founded: 1993
- Ground: Mile End Stadium, Mile End
- League: Inner London Football League

Beaumont Athletic F.C. is an English football club based in Mile End in the London Borough of Tower Hamlets, England. It plays in the Inner London Football League, which is not part of the English football league system.

== History ==
Beaumont Athletic F.C. was established in summer 1993 by a group of former pupils of Stepney Green School with the help of the head of year. The team was based around Stepney Green and spent the first year playing in local tournaments and friendly matches. In summer 1994, Beaumont recorded successes in the Tower Hamlets 7-a-side tournament and the Asian national 6-a-side tournament in which 96 teams from across the country participated. Beaumont was the runner-up in the national 6-a-side tournament and was offered the chance to join the Asian Football League.

Beaumont played in the Asian Football League from 1994 to 2001 in which they won promotion twice from the 1st Division. During summer 1997, Tower Hamlets members started the Summer League (known as League Bangla) and Beaumont has been participating in that league for ten years, winning the 1st division and being runner-up in the premier division twice.

In 2001, Beaumont gained Intermediate status and joined the London Intermediate League and in the first season won promotion from the 1st Division. In 2003, Beaumont had a setback as the intermediate league folded and, because of pitch problems, Beaumont was not granted a place in any other intermediate league. Beaumont played in the Essex Business League from 2003 to 2006.

Tower Hamlets Council's leisure department opened up the application process for Mile End Stadium and Beaumont's application to use the facility was successful, ahead of ten other applicants. This led to Beaumont making a bid to play in the Senior League (Essex). Initially, the application was rejected because Beaumont was not part of the National League system. However, after consultation and correspondence with the League and the FA, Beaumont was granted senior status in June 2006. Beaumont played at Senior level from 2006 to 2008, picking up over 25 points in the final season. In 2007, Beaumont also took part in the FA Vase Cup.

At the time, Beaumont was only the second club from the borough to compete at this level and the fourth British Asian team to play senior football in England. The club subsequently stated its ambition to progress further within the English football league system.

Beaumont under-18s played in the Eastern Alliance League and wants to take part in the FA Youth Cup where professional youth teams participate.

== Honours ==
- London Intermediate League
  - Runners-up 2001–02

== Records ==
- FA Vase
  - Second Qualifying Round 2007–08
