= Eastbourne Town F.C. =

Association football club in England

Eastbourne Town
- Full name: Eastbourne Town Football Club
- Nicknames: The Town; The Townies; Blue and Yellows
- Founded: 19 October 1881; 145 years ago (as Devonshire Park FC)
- Ground: The Saffrons, Eastbourne
- Capacity: 3,000 (200 Seated)
- Chairman: Dave Shearing
- Manager: Jude Macdonald
- League: Isthmian League South East Division
- 2025–26: Isthmian League South East Division, 11th of 22
- Website: http://eastbournetown.com/
Home colours	Away colours

Eastbourne Town Football Club is an English football club based in Eastbourne, East Sussex. It is currently a member of the Isthmian League South East Division, and the team play at The Saffrons.

Founded on 19 October 1881 as Devonshire Park F.C., it was a founding member of the Sussex County F.A. in 1882, the Southern Amateur Football League in 1907 and the Sussex County Football League in 1920. Eastbourne Town is considered the oldest senior football club in Sussex.

The club is a FA Chartered Standard Community club affiliated to the Sussex County Football Association.

== History ==
=== Early history (1880-1905) ===
Location of Eastbourne in England

The 13 November 1880 edition of the Eastbourne Chronicle first reported the formation of Eastbourne United Football Club as a result of the amalgamation of Eastbourne Rovers and Eastbourne FC. The club briefly changed its name to Eastbourne Football Club at a meeting on 5 October 1881. Having failed to secure the use of a ground in South Fields (near Guildredge Park), permission was sought to play on the grounds of Devonshire Park. Part of the deal was to change the name to Devonshire Park; in return, the park company would supply all match materials and pay travelling expenses to away games. At a meeting on 19 October 1881, it was agreed that the club would be known as Devonshire Park F.C. named after the original ground at which the team played; this is now occupied by the Devonshire Park Lawn Tennis Club, and is also the venue for the Eastbourne International tennis tournament.

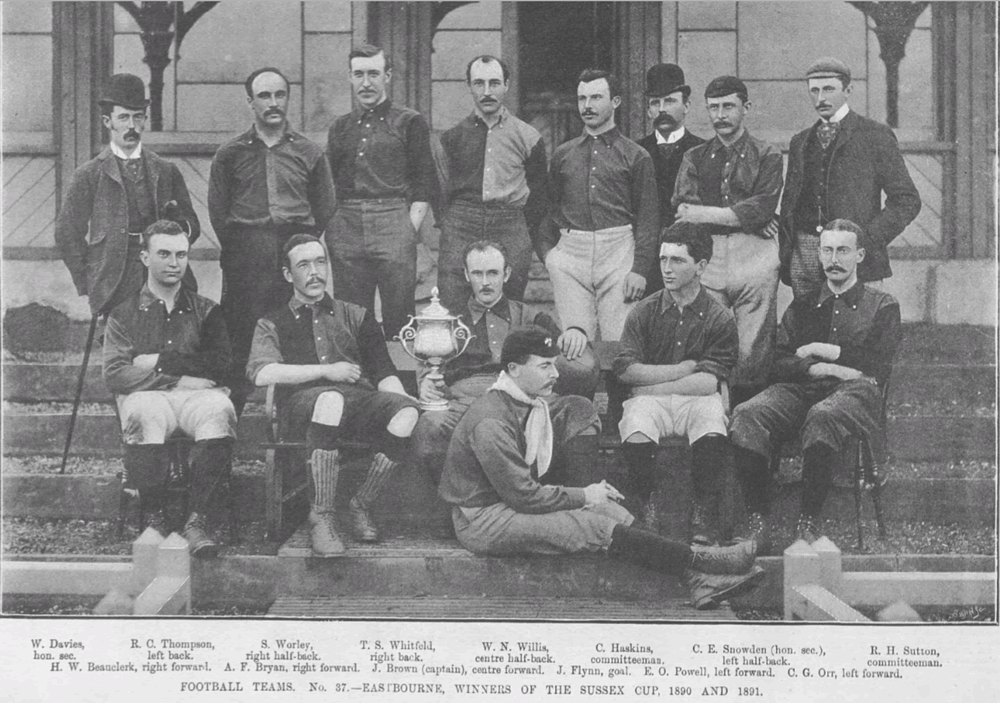
Eastbourne Football Club team photo from February 1892 displaying the Sussex Cup won in 1890 and 1891

The first recorded game was against Clifton House School on 26 October 1881, which was won by Devonshire Park 5–1. The first loss was against New College on 12 November 1881. A game in which Devonshire Park lost 5–0. Their first recorded away win was on 26 November 1881 with an away game at Ardingly College, although the game was played in a 'downpour of rain' and the pitch was in a bad state. Devonshire Park won the game by 4 goals to 1. On 23 September 1882, at a meeting in Brighton with other clubs in Sussex, Devonshire Park became one of eleven clubs that formed the Sussex County Football Association, with Captain Cardwell being nominated as one of the vice-presidents for the first season. In the same year was the creation of the Sussex Senior Cup, following a dispute with a cup tie, Devonshire Park withdrew from the Sussex County FA.

Playing at Devonshire Park for 5 years with the Tennis club and a cricket club, they moved to the then newly opened Saffrons Field in 1886 when tennis became a predominant sport there and the success of the South of England Championships. It has been their home since, along with Eastbourne Cricket Club and Eastbourne Hockey Club. In 1888, Devonshire Park rejoined the Sussex FA and competed again in the Sussex Senior Cup, reaching the semi-finals with Burgess Hill

In 1889 the club changed its name to Eastbourne F.C. to reflect the expansion of the town after the railway brought in tourism. Although not in a league and still an amateur team, they competed in the Sussex Senior Cup reaching the final and beating Chichester 4–0. The following season the club founder, Rev. Willis, was elected as the club secretary, and the senior cup was done on a league basis in which Eastbourne won, playing 15 games, winning 14 and drawing a game with Chichester. Eastbourne reached the Sussex Senior Cup final ten times between 1889 and 1903, winning eight times in that period. Around the turn of the century, Eastbourne played professional teams such as Woolwich Arsenal, Derby County and West Ham United. It has been recorded that Eastbourne played and won in two international tournaments: in 1904 the 'Meeting du Nouvel' and in 1909, the Challenge International du Nord, both cups were invitations for amateur clubs to compete in.

=== South Eastern League (1905-1907) ===
In 1905 Eastbourne FC joined the South Eastern League replacing local rivals, Eastbourne Swifts, who were playing in Division One in the league unable to raise a team. Eastbourne wrote to the league asking to take over from the Swifts team in which the league agreed. The first season wasn't a success, playing mainly against professional reserve teams in the Football League and were relegated into Division Two. The second season was also unsuccessful and Eastbourne withdrew at the end of the 1906–07 season.

=== Amateur Football Alliance (1907-1976) ===
==== Southern Amateur League (1907-1946) ====
In 1907 the club split from the Football Association, as they did not recognise amateur clubs. At a meeting on 25 July 1907, the club committee decided to join the Amateur Football Association and became founding members of the Southern Amateur Football League. Along with Ipswich Town, they remained in the league until 1946, winning the Sussex Senior Cup a further three times in that period. In 1909 Eastbourne was invited to play in the Challenge International du Nord, a competition for amateur teams in both England and France, reaching the final after beating Le Havre AC 2–0. The final was played in front of 2,000 spectators against RC Roubaix, and Eastbourne won 5–0. Town entered the competition in December 1909 but withdrew after a dispute with their opponents and at Christmas hosted Paris University, winning 10–1; the following Easter Red Star Paris visited and beat Eastbourne 8–1. On Boxing Day 1910, Eastbourne were defeated 3–2 by Racing Club Paris.

In 1920, the "Town" was one of the founding teams of the Sussex County Football League. Finishing third in the 1920-21 season and finishing 8th in the Southern Amateur League the same season. They returned fully committed to the Southern Amateur Football League, winning the league twice in 1923 and 1926 and, in four consecutive seasons, reaching the AFA Senior Cup final, winning the trophy twice and beating Ealing Association 1–0 in 1922 and 2–0 in 1925. Also winning the Sussex Senior Cup in 1922.

April 1931 saw the retirement of David Noakes, who had managed the club for the past 25 years, and his role was taken over by the club captain Mr W. S. Grevett. In his first two seasons he lifted the Sussex Senior Cup twice and the Sussex RUR Cup in 1933 at their first attempt but still struggled in the Southern Amateur League, finishing mid-table in most seasons. At the end of the 1937–38 season, Eastbourne were relegated into Division 2 A, but came back up the following season after winning the league. The Second World War brought a halt to the league and regular friendly fixtures being played. Eastbourne played the 1939–40 season in the Sussex County league and came sixth in the Eastern Division. 1943 saw their heaviest defeat with an army team. The Southern Amateur League restarted in 1945. The 1945–46 season saw Eastbourne finish 5th in the table.

==== Corinthian and Athenian Leagues (1946-1976) ====
In 1946 Eastbourne left the Southern Amateur League and joined the Corinthian League, another amateur football league for teams based in the south of England. Attendances averaged around 3000 and the ground was improved; the pitch was moved closer to the cricket ground to allow the Town Hall side to be terraced. Town won the R.U.R. Cup twice again in 1948 and in 1950 under manager W.E. Collings but were hovering around mid-table around that period. In December 1950, defender Eric Beardsley became the club's first amateur international player, being selected to play for the England amateur team against the Republic of Ireland on 6 January 1951. He lasted 4 minutes into his debut when he broke his ankle.⁣ In June 1951, Collings resigned from his role as manager after 9 years.

The 1950s saw George Duke, a professional coach between 1949 and 1954, and manager Bob Baker, winning the Sussex Senior Cup in 1953, the last time Eastbourne won this competition. Both were found guilty along with other officials in the club in a fraud conspiracy where amateur players were being paid more than the F.A. amateur salary cap. Duke was banned from football and football management for a period of one year, and the club was fined £50. The club recorded their highest attendance on 10 October 1953, when 7,378 spectators watched local rivals Hastings United play in the FA Cup 2nd qualifying round. Eastbourne lost the game 7–2. 1954 saw Scottish-born Alex White, a former Chelsea defender, briefly manage the team until the end of the season, and George Skinner took over from June 1954 until 1959, later becoming the chief coach for the Sussex FA and later the national coach for Libya, Jordan, and Saudi Arabia.

Skinner left in the summer of 1959 and was replaced by Jock McGuire, who lifted the Sussex Intermediate Cup for the first time at the end of the season and was replaced by Don Gold, who the previous season was coaching the minors' team and played for the Town for years before that. Whilst in charge, 1961 saw another milestone in the club's history. A game versus Moulsecoomb Rovers in the FA Amateur Cup saw the Town win 13–1, a feat that has yet to be beaten. Town were finishing around mid-table at this point. In 1963 the Corinthian League merged with the Athenian League and placed in the first division for the first three seasons before being relegated into the second division. Town again was finishing around mid-table. In 1967 Town reached the 4th Qualifying Round of the F.A. Cup but lost at home to a strong Margate side 9–0 and finished that season in 15th. Town missed out on promotion in the 1968–69 season and finished 3rd by four points, and again nearly reached the 1st round proper of the F.A. Cup drawing Canterbury City 2–2 at the Saffrons in the 4th Qualifying Round, but losing the replay 4–2.

1969–70 season saw success in the A.F.A. Invitation Cup but finished 4th in the league and in 1971 the club being nicknamed as the "town club" for over 80 years, became Eastbourne Town F.C. their present name today. Town reached the finals of the 1971–72 Sussex Senior Cup losing 1–0 to Ringmer at the Goldstone Ground. Attendances were falling in this period, although reaching the 5th round of the FA Vase in the 1975–76 season, the club resigned from the Athenian League at the end of that season as became uneconomic to remain.

=== Sussex County League (1976–2007) ===
Joining the Sussex County Football League for the second time in the 1976–77 season, the team was placed in Division 1 and won the title; a year later, they reached the Sussex Senior Cup final, losing 4–0 to Worthing at the Goldstone Ground, a regular fixture for the cup between 1952 and 1995. Onwards in the league for 20 years between 1980 and 2000, Town saw 14 different managers and was quite quiet in the Sussex County League. Usually finishing around mid-table. In 1985 Town seemed stronger, finishing 3rd in the table and reaching the semi-finals of the R.U.R. cup. In the 1985–86 season Town finished 3rd again but won the R.U.R. Cup, which it then won again the following season. After which, the Town were quiet again, finishing in the top five the following two seasons before going back to finishing in the lower half of the table. They nearly missed out on relegation in the 1992–93 and 1993–94 seasons, finishing 17th both seasons, and the 1990s were no improvement to the team. Towards the end of the decade, a joint management team with Rob Thorley and ex-Langney Sports manager Peter Cherry seemed to improve the team but had a shock in the 2000–01 season when Town were relegated for the first ever time into Division Two, along with Lancing and East Preston. With manager Dave Winterton at the helm, Division Two only lasted two seasons, finishing 4th in 2002. The summer of 2002 saw Yemi Odubade sign for Eastbourne Town having moved from Nigeria, and become a prolific goal scorer alongside Gary Brockwell. They contributed to Town's then record of 97 goals in the league but were runners-up at the end of the 2002–03 season by 3 points to Rye & Iden and returned to Division 1. Yemi was also top scorer the following season and left in the summer of 2004 when Yeovil Town took an interest in his 70-plus goals in his two seasons at Town, who finished that season in 5th place. Yemi was clearly missed in the 2004–05 season when Town dropped form and Dave Winterton was sacked by the Town board in January 2005 for his aggression to match officials and was replaced by Adrian Colwell 18 days later, finishing the season in 10th place.

=== Isthmian League (2007–2014) ===
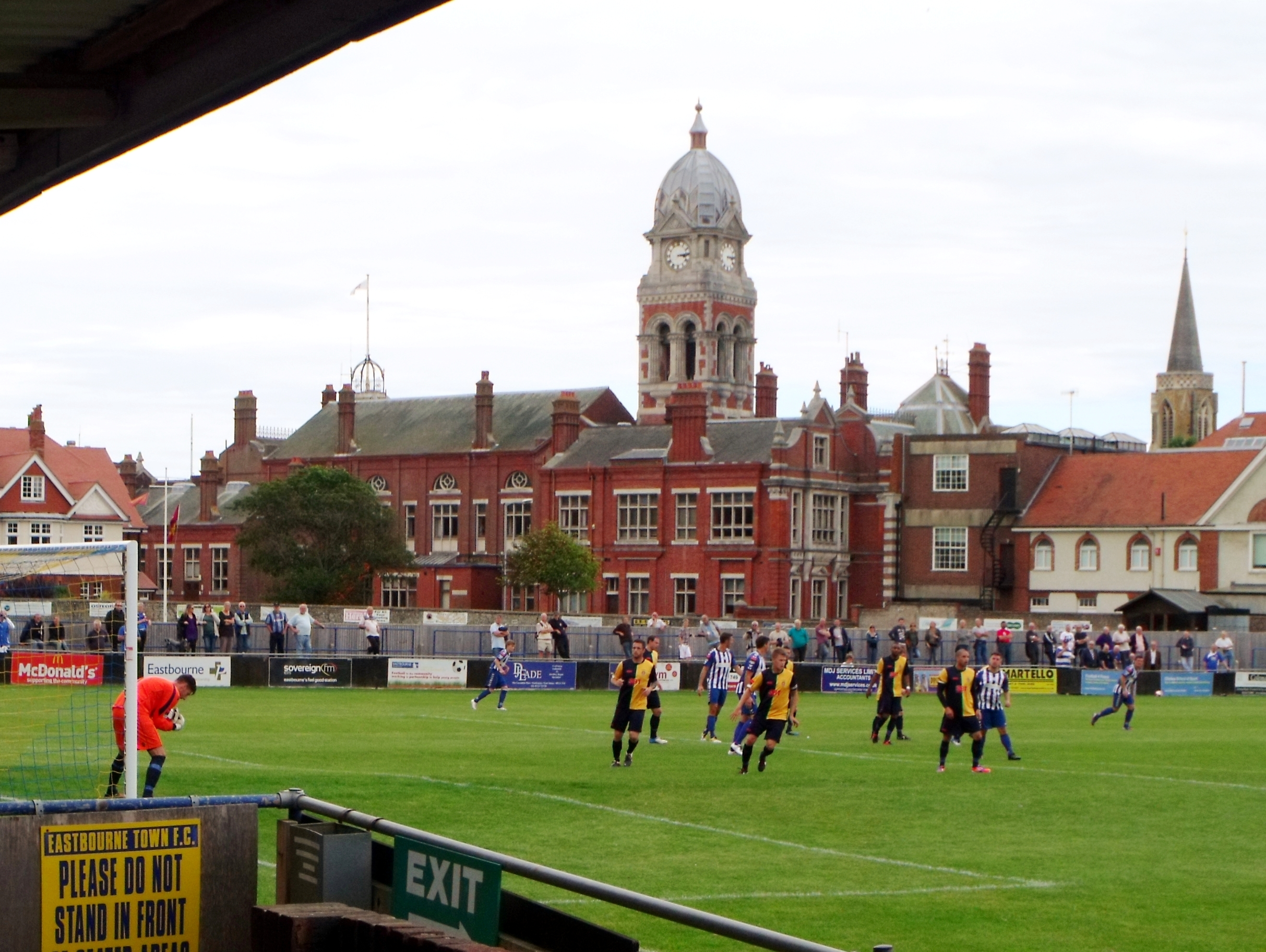
Isthmian league game v Herne Bay in August 2012

The 2006–07 season saw them as County League champions for the second time in their history, 30 years after the previous time, securing the title by defeating Oakwood F.C. 6–1 away and earning promotion to the Isthmian League Division 1 South. Eastbourne Town survived the first season in the Isthmian League, finishing 19th with 44 points.

Danny Bloor replaced Colwell as manager in 2009 and finished the 2008–09 season 13th in the table. In the 2009–10 season, the club finished bottom of the table with just 6 wins; however, they were reprieved from relegation when Ashford Town went into administration, with Folkestone Invicta and Croydon Athletic both being promoted into the Isthmian Premier Division and a knock-on effect from Merthyr Tydfil being expelled from the Southern League and liquidating.

Town finished 18th in the 2010–11 season and 14th in the 2011–12 season. In the 2012–13 season Bloor hired ex Eastbourne Borough manager Gary Wilson as his assistant manager, Town finished the season 11th in the table, the highest finishing position to date. Bloor left the club in June 2013, and the club saw two different managers over six months. Kevin Laundon, who had four league games between June and August, and Tony Reid from August to January 2014. John Lambert took over in January 2014 but was unable to keep Town out of the relegation zone, and after seven seasons in the Isthmian League, Eastbourne Town were relegated back into the Sussex County League at the end of the 2013–14 season, along with Crawley Down Gatwick.

=== Southern Combination Football League (2014-2024) ===
Town came 4th in the Sussex County League Division 1 in 2014–15 season, and reached the quarter-finals of the Peter Bentley League Cup, but Town did have success in winning the RUR Cup final scoring two late goals against a 10-man Loxwood.

The 2015–16 season, the Sussex County Football League was renamed and became the Southern Combination League (SCFL) and what was Division 1 became the Premier Division. The 2015–16 season saw Eastbourne finish in 2nd place in the league and reach the 3rd qualifying round of the FA Cup for the first time in 47 years. At this point attendances started to rise as a new fanbase started. The 2016-17 and 2017–18 seasons not only saw Eastbourne Town finish 5th in the table but achieve a successful run in the FA Vase by reaching the 4th round on both occasions, losing to Crowborough Athletic and Windsor. The 2018–19 season saw them being knocked out by Abbey Rangers F.C. in the third round, which led them to concentrate the rest of the season on league results, finishing the season 3rd place and reaching the quarter-finals of the Sussex Senior Cup, losing to Brighton & Hove Albion Under 23 squad and a tight game which went into extra time.

The 2019–20 season started with more success, by November the Town were unbeaten in the league drawing only two games. Although had been knocked out of the League and Sussex Senior Cups, they were still in the FA Vase beating Windsor 7–1 in the second round. By the end of November, Town had lost two league games, to Lancing and to Crawley Down and again knocked out of the 3rd round of the FA Vase in a tight game away at Leighton Town. By the end February Town were sitting around 3rd place in the table and reached the finals of the Sussex RUR Cup beating Lancing 2–0. In March the league was postponed due to the COVID-19 pandemic and the league was abandoned with all results expunged on 26 March 2020, including the RUR Cup final.

The 2020–21 season started on 5 September 2020, a late start due to the COVID-19 pandemic with only one league cup to compete in, the Sussex Senior Cup. The FA Cup and FA Vase was also played with Eastbourne being knocked out the Preliminary and First Rounds respectively. The season was also halted between 5 November and 2 December as the United Kingdom had a 4 week lockdown. The season briefly restarted but was again halted on 22 December with the season never to restart again. A supplementary shield competition was played in April 2021 with the main league curtailed. Normality was restored in the 2021–22 season, however Town finished 6th place and manager John Lambert and his assistant Jamie Podmore decided to step down from first team management.

On 19 May 2022, it was announced that former Whitehawk manager, Jude Macdonald, would take over as first team manager. Finishing his first season in charge 9th in the league with a successful FA Cup and Vase run in a few years. Town finished the 2023–24 season in second in the league with 82 points and earning a place in the play-offs, winning the semi-final 2–0 against Hassocks and the final, also 2–0, against Newhaven, Eastbourne Town were back into the Isthmian Football League after a ten-year absence.

=== Return to the Isthmian League (2024-present) ===
The first season back in the South East Division of the Isthmian League, Town finished 15th. Early in the season they were knocked out of the FA Cup in the preliminary round by Burgess Hill Town, they also saw the return of the FA Trophy in which Town were quickly knocked out in the 1st qualifying round by a strong Kingstonian side. And went three rounds in the Sussex Senior Cup being knocked out by Horsham.

== Colours and Badge ==
=== Club crest ===
The club crest is mostly based on the Eastbourne coat of arms. As with all the other Eastbourne sports teams who use the same basis of the town crest, with the exception of rival team Eastbourne United, they also used the same town crest until their merger with Shinewater Association in 2003. And Eastbourne Borough, who have their own crest. Over the years the club crest has had different colour versions. For a while the crest was in blue and yellow instead of the red and white as used by the town council and the hockey and rugby clubs in the town but reverted in 2019.

- The red bars are from the Badlesmere family, landowners of the Eastbourne area and residents of Bourne Place, now known as Compton Place in the 14th century.
- The stags' heads are from the arms of the Duke of Devonshire, the principal landowners of Eastbourne, notably the landowners of The Saffrons.
- The rose and visor from the arms of the Davies-Gilbert family, another large landowner of the town.

The seahorse is above the crest to resemble Eastbourne as a coastal town.

Both the Devonshire and Davies-Gilbert families contributed to developing Eastbourne in the 1850s. The motto 'MELIORA SEQUIMUR' is translated to "We follow the better things", also on the Eastbourne coat of arms.

=== Football Kits ===
The club's colours have mainly been yellow and dark blue, the colours of William Cavendish, the Duke of Devonshire, which were also adopted around Eastbourne including the fleet of the former Eastbourne Buses. The club originally played in yellow and blue halves until just before the 1960s when the team played in yellow shirts with variations over the years.

1881–1958	1960s until 1990s	Circa 1999	Circa 2010	2012–2014	2017–2019	2019–2021	2021–2022	2022–2024

=== Kit suppliers and shirt sponsors ===
Period	Kit supplier	Shirt sponsor
1881–1985	Unknown	None
1985–1986	Unknown	Holmes & Leadbitter
1986–1988	Unknown	Stone Carpets
1988–1990	Unknown	Maybank of Newhaven
1991-92	Unknown	Stone Carpets
1993–1998	Unknown	Eastbourne Car Auctions
1999–2000	Unknown	Trident Fish Restaurant
2000-2004	Unknown	Owen Contractors
2004-2007	(England) Prostar Sports	Owen Contractors
2007–2010	(United States) Nike	Owen Contractors
2010–2011	(United States) Nike	D J Eade Jewellers
2011–2014	(England) MKK Sports	Sussex Business Times
2014–2015	(United States) Nike	McDonald's
2015–2017	(Italy) Macron	UK Packaging
2017–2019	(Italy) Errea	UK Packaging
2019–2022	(Italy) Macron	UK Packaging
2022–2024	(England) Umbro	Coleman Plant Hire
2024-2026	(Italy) Macron	Coleman Plant Hire
2026–Present	(Italy) Macron	East Sussex College

== Ground ==
=== Devonshire Park (1881–1886) ===
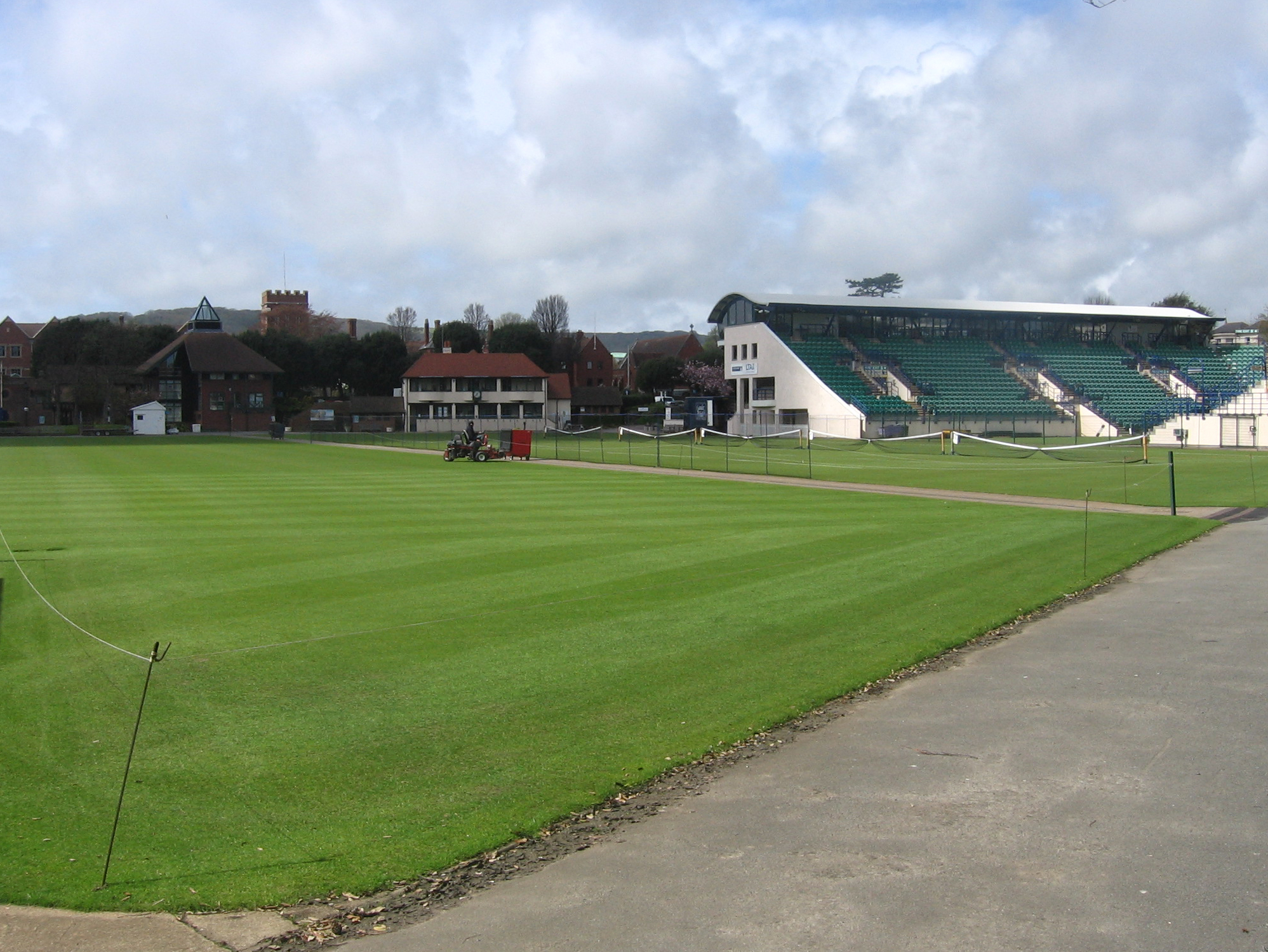
Devonshire Park Clubhouse, April 2008.

Originally a cricket ground, Devonshire Park opened its gates in 1874, with tennis courts added in 1879. Devonshire Park FC, being formed in 1881, played on a grass pitch here the same time the South of England Championships tournament started.

The first recorded game played here by Devonshire Park was on 12 November 1881 versus New College, a game which Devonshire Park lost 5 - 0.

After 5 years, as the tournament became popular, both the football team and cricket team moved 500 metres northwest to the newly opened Saffrons Field.

Devonshire Park is still open and is the current venue for the annual Eastbourne International tennis tournament.

=== The Saffrons (1886–present) ===
Eastbourne Town currently play their home games at The Saffrons, Compton Place Road, Eastbourne, East Sussex, BN21 1EA. Located in Eastbourne town centre, a 5-minute walk from Eastbourne Railway Station.

Eastbourne Town have played football here since 1886, when the then Devonshire Park Football Club moved grounds from their former namesake (now the venue for the Eastbourne International Tennis Tournament).

The ground is enclosed with a cricket pitch, hockey pitch and grass bowls surrounding three sides of the ground, all of which share a clubhouse. There is a capacity limit of 3,000 spectators and seating for 200. The gatehouse at the Meads Road end was built in 1914. 1994 Also saw the main stand and floodlights installed. There is also an uninterrupted view of the Town Hall; the chimes are often heard during home games.

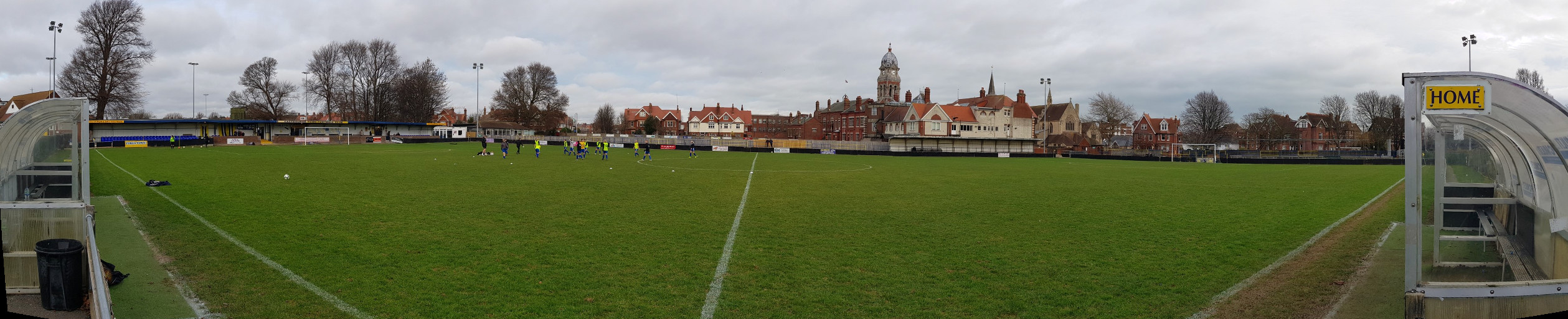
A panorama view of The Saffrons football ground. Taffy Jones/Sid Mayall stand on the left, East Terrace in the middle and Meads Road end on the right. 13 January 2019

== Supporters ==
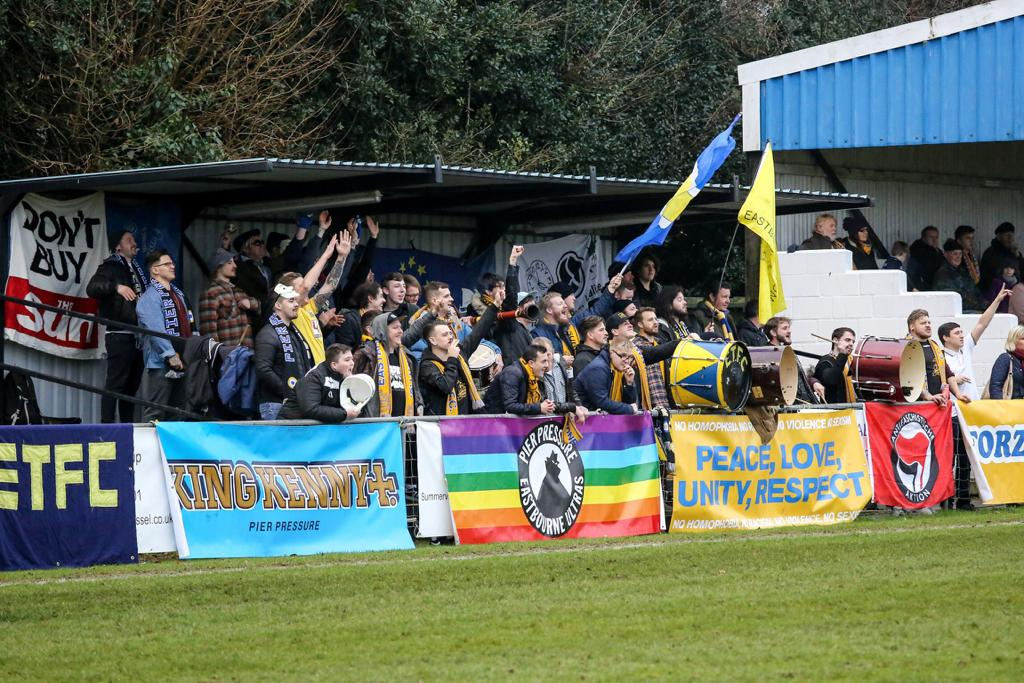
Pier Pressure at an away game

The first reference of the Eastbourne Supporters Club goes back to September 1930 when the club reported growing membership numbers. The club was formed to encourage its supporters to visit games at home by introducing season tickets and arranging transport to away games. By September 1937, membership was noted at 148 members and slowly growing. By June 1951 the membership totalled 949 members. Numbers dropped in the 1970s.

In the present day Eastbourne Town's support now includes two main supporter groups, Pier Pressure and the Beachy Head Ultras. Starting in 2015, the groups follow the European ultras tradition and were formed by local fans disengaged with modern professional football. The club's supporter groups have regularly backed anti-discrimination and anti-homophobia initiatives, amongst many other initiatives within the community. Pier Pressure have strong links with the Whitehawk Ultras, and both groups regularly visit each other's games. There have also been similar links with the supporters of Dulwich Hamlet and Clapton Community.

Pier Pressure are often heard at both home and away games, often with drums, big flags and unique chanting. An occasional saxophone makes an appearance at certain games. A youth section was formed during the 2018–19 season, with kids from local schools, who make use of the free entry, join in. Bringing in their own drums and flags for support.

The groups have gained attention for their graphic work for the club (programmes, merchandising and promotional posters) using an eclectic range of visuals relating to Eastbourne, including Throbbing Gristle's 20 Jazz Funk Greats, co-author of the Communist Manifesto, Friedrich Engels (whose ashes were scattered in the town) and Aleister Crowley (who edited a Chess column for the local newspaper).

Eastbourne Town often has games where over 100 people attend. In March 2019 it was noted that Eastbourne Town, along with Peacehaven & Telscombe, was 8th in the top 13 non-league Sussex clubs with the highest attendance. The average is standing at 257.

== Rivals ==
Eastbourne is one of very few towns to have three senior teams. The highest-ranked of these, Eastbourne Borough, who play in the Isthmian League Premier Division, aren't considered rivals since they compete at a higher level. The other, Eastbourne United, plays in the Southern Combination Premier League and was in the same league with Eastbourne Town until promotion in 2024. Langney Wanderers were another rival team until the club folded in 2021. Another local team, Hailsham Town, which is some 8 miles away in Hailsham, was also considered a rival when Eastbourne United and Eastbourne Borough, previously called Langney Sports before 2001, were both playing at different levels.

=== Eastbourne Derby ===
For many years, the unofficial named Eastbourne Derby has been played between the two oldest clubs in Eastbourne, Eastbourne Town and Eastbourne United, often attracting big crowds. The first competitive meeting between the two clubs was in 1920 in the East Sussex Challenge Cup between Eastbourne (Town) and Eastbourne Royal Engineers Old Comrades (United). The town team won the game 2–1 in front of a crowd of 3,671 spectators at The Saffrons. During the 2018–19 season, the Boxing Day fixture saw a record crowd in the 21st century of 856 people. The game was won by Eastbourne Town 5 goals to nil.

1 April 2024 saw the 100th meeting of the two clubs, with Eastbourne Town winning 3–0 in front of a crowd of 687.

== Players ==
=== Current squad ===
Correct as of 30 August 2026

Note: Flags indicate national team as defined under FIFA eligibility rules; some limited exceptions apply. Players may hold more than one non-FIFA nationality.

No.	Pos.	Nation	Player
—	GK	ENG	Chris Winterton (captain)
—	DF	ENG	Lewis Broughton
—	DF	ENG	Oliver Deda
—	DF	ENG	Leon Greig
—	DF	ENG	Nathan Hover
—	DF	ENG	Jack Murphy
—	DF	ENG	JJ Walker
—	MF	ENG	Luke Emberson
—	MF	ENG	Harvey Greig
—	MF	ENG	Eliot Jenks
—	MF	POL	Marcin Ruda

No.	Pos.	Nation	Player
—	MF	ENG	Alfie Simmons
—	MF	ENG	Anesu Sisimayi
—	FW	ENG	Theo Aiguobasimwin
—	FW	ENG	Aaron Capon
—	FW	ENG	Ollie Davies
—	FW	ENG	Arron Hopkinson
—	FW	ENG	Austin Pugh
—	FW	ENG	Ed Ratcliffe
—	FW	ENG	Alfie Rogers
—	FW	ENG	Zack Tarrant (On loan from Eastbourne Borough)
—	FW	ENG	Sonny Walsh

== Club officials ==
=== Boardroom staff ===
Position	Name
Chairman	(England) Dave Shearing
Vice Chairman	(England) Ross Perrin
President	(England) Chris Backhurst
Vice President	(Italy) Tony Guarino
Match Secretary	(England) Paul Howes
Commercial Manager	(England) James Hopkins
General Manager	(England) Richard Marsh
Kit Co-Ordinator	(England) Richard Dyson
Social Secretary	(Italy) Luci Del-gaudio
Club Welfare Officer	(England) Chris Storey
Club Safety Officer	(England) Paul Howes
Head of Digital Media	(England) Josh Claxton
Other Boardroom staff	(England) Ed Copping (Italy) Cristiano Desideri (England) Dave Jenkins (England) Paul Lewis (England) Wendy North (England) Steven Paul (England) Steve Roberts (England) Ray Tuppen (England) Jamie Yates

=== First Team staff ===
Position	Name
Manager	(England) Jude Macdonald
Assistant Manager	(England) Ben Davis
First Team Coaches	(England) Matt Elphick (England) Adam Davidson (England) Roman Glazier
Goalkeeping Coach	(England) Dave Winterton
Performance & Statistical Analyst	(England) Ryan Heasman
First Team Physiotherapists	(England) Dom Crowhurst
Under-18 Manager	(England) Jim Colston
Under-18 Coach	(England) Andy Corrigan

== Management history ==
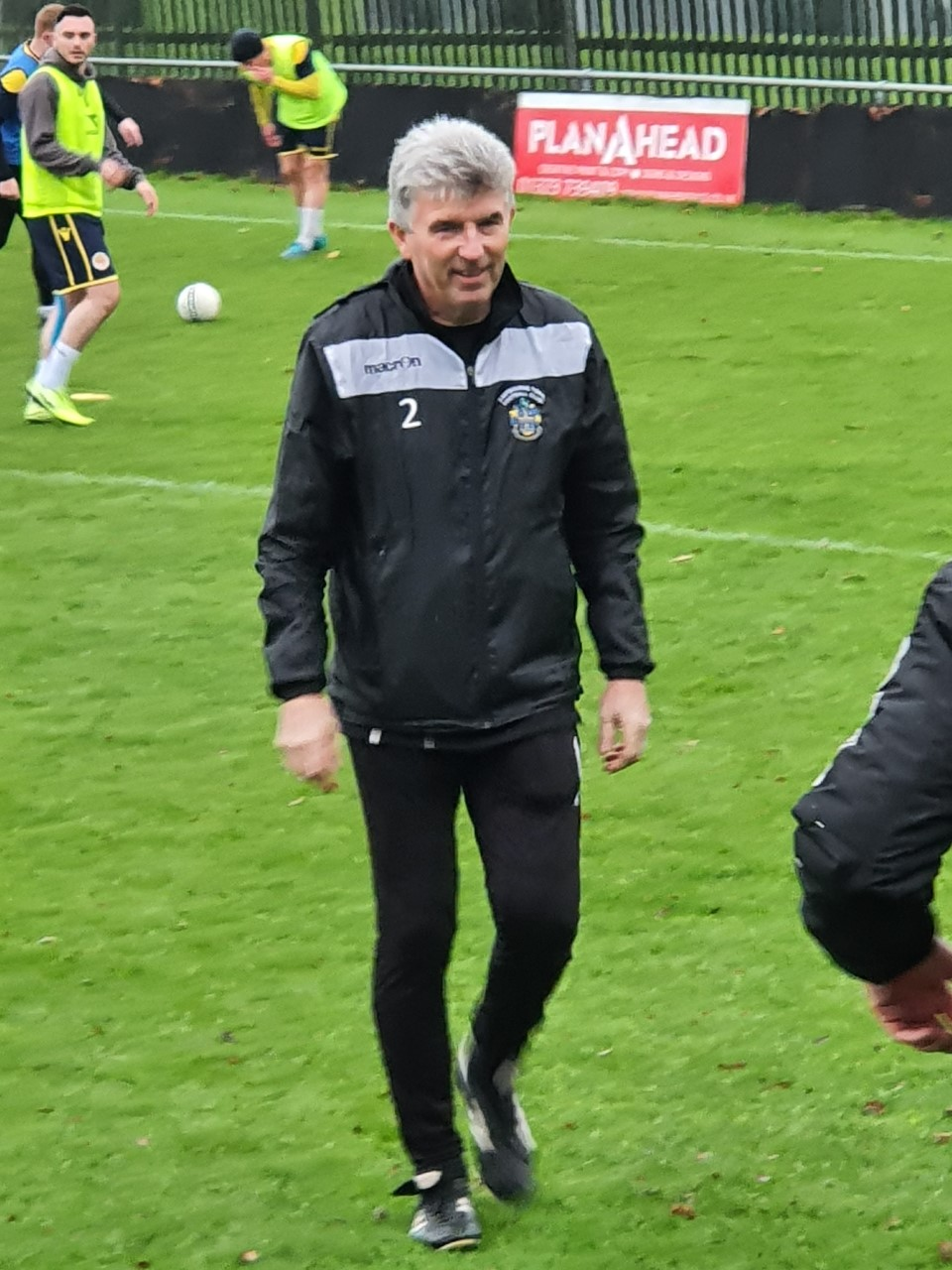
John Lambert, who managed the side between 2014 and 2022

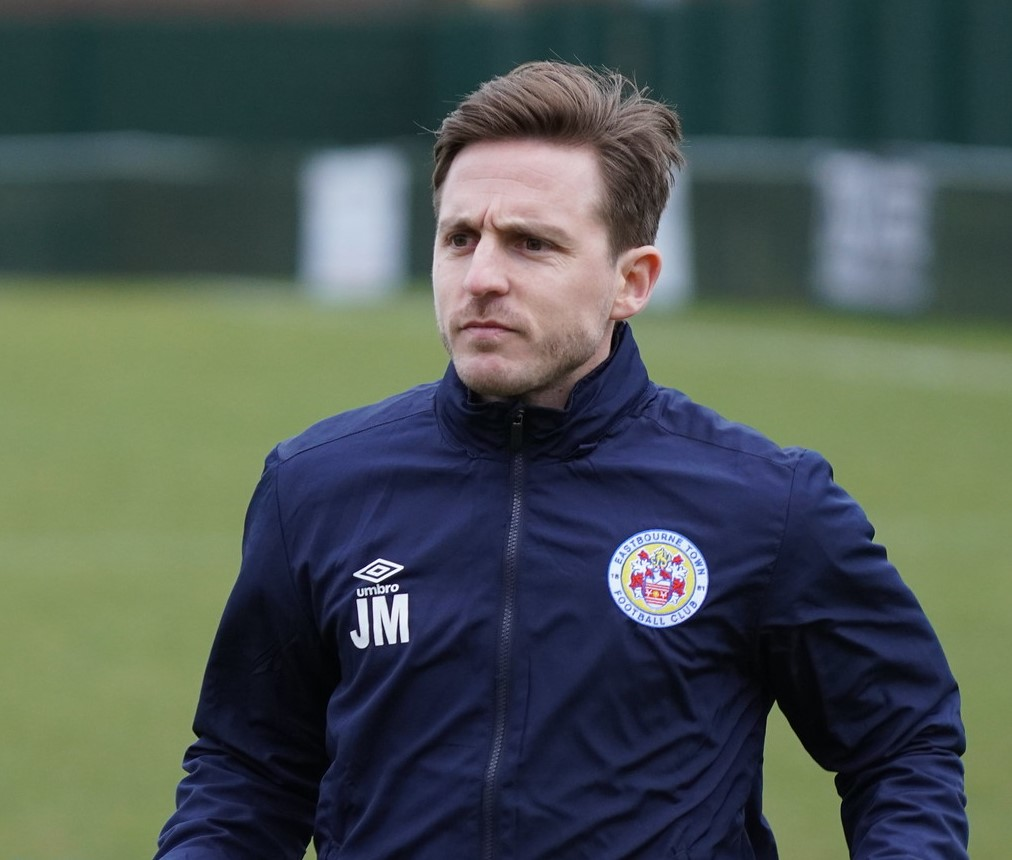
Jude Macdonald, current manager from 2022

Between 1880 and 1942 Eastbourne Town managers were known as honorable secretaries, nominated at each annual general meeting, after which they were known as managers.

Key

- League matches only. M = Matches played; W = Matches won; D = Matches drawn; L = Matches lost; Win % = percentage of total matches won
- † Managers with this background and symbol in the "Name" column are italicised to denote caretaker appointments.
- ‡ Managers with this background and symbol in the "Name" column are italicised to denote caretaker appointments promoted to full-time manager.

Stats as of 25 April 2026.

Name	Nationality	From	To	Duration	M	W	D	L	Win %	Honors	Notes
Jeremiah Kimber	England	29 October 1880	23 March 1881	145 days	—	—	—	—	—		
Thomas Sutton	England	23 March 1881	5 October 1881	196 days	—	—	—	—	—		
Arthur Hillman	England	5 October 1881	27 September 1887	5 years, 357 days	—	—	—	—	—		
Richard Sutton	England	27 September 1887	31 May 1890	2 years, 246 days	—	—	—	—	—	Sussex Senior Cup Winners: 1889–90	
Charles Snowden	England	31 May 1890	22 June 1892	2 years, 22 days	—	—	—	—	—	Sussex Senior Cup Winners: 1890–91	
W. S. Sheldon	England	22 June 1892	31 May 1894	1 year, 343 days	—	—	—	—	—	Sussex Senior Cup Winners: 1893–94	
E. C. Cooper	England	1 June 1894	2 April 1895	305 days	—	—	—	—	—	Sussex Senior Cup Winners: 1894–95	
George Wood	England	3 April 1895	31 December 1897	5 years, 192 days	—	—	—	—	—		
Walter Andrews	England	1 January 1898	1 February 1900	2 years, 31 days	—	—	—	—	—	Sussex Senior Cup Winners: 1898–99; Eastbourne Charity Cup Winners: 1897–98	
Charles Wriford	England	1 February 1900	9 September 1906	6 years, 220 days	17	1	4	12	5.88	Sussex Senior Cup Winners: 1899–1900, 1900–01, 1902–03; Tournoi du Novel An Paris Winners: 1904; Eastbourne Charity Cup 1899–1900	
David Noakes	England	10 September 1906	30 April 1931	24 years, 232 days	395	192	62	141	48.61	Southern Amateur League Division 1 Champions: 1922–23 1925–26; AFA Senior Cup Winners: 1921–22 1924–25; Sussex Senior Cup Winners: 1921–22; Challenge International du Nord Winners: 1909; Eastbourne Charity Cup Winners 1909–10	
William Grevett	England	1 May 1931	26 October 1939	8 years, 178 days	172	65	28	79	37.79	Southern Amateur League Division 2 Champions: 1938–39; Sussex Senior Cup Winners: 1931–32 1932–33; Sussex RUR Cup Winners: 1932–33	
David Noakes	England	27 October 1939	4 March 1942	2 years, 128 days	14	4	4	6	28.57		
Ernest Collings	England	5 March 1942	13 June 1951	9 years, 100 days	140	49	22	69	35.00	Sussex RUR Cup Winners: 1947–48, 1949–50	
Robert Baker	England	14 June 1951	20 July 1953	2 years, 36 days	52	16	14	22	30.77	Sussex Senior Cup Winners: 1952–53	
George Duke ‡	England	21 July 1953	21 February 1954	215 days	13	7	2	4	53.85		
Alex White	Scotland	23 February 1954	29 June 1954	126 days	13	4	3	6	30.77		
George Skinner	England	30 June 1954	29 June 1959	4 years, 364 days	136	33	33	70	24.26		
Jock McGuire	Scotland	1 July 1959	14 August 1960	1 year, 44 days	30	8	4	18	26.67		
Don Gold ‡	England	15 August 1960	30 April 1962	1 year, 289 days	60	18	12	30	30.00		
Bob Mallen	England	1 May 1962	16 May 1964	2 years, 15 days	56	14	8	34	25.00		
Jack Boyd	Scotland	4 July 1964	11 September 1965	1 year, 69 days	34	9	9	16	26.47		
Alan Cornwall †	England	12 September 1965	31 May 1966	261 days	26	6	3	17	23.08		
William Booth	England	1 June 1966	7 May 1968	1 year, 355 days	60	14	8	38	23.33		
Melton "Taffy" Jones	Wales	14 May 1968	22 April 1972	3 years, 326 days	120	51	32	37	42.50	A.F.A Invitation Cup Winners: 1969–70	
William Booth	England	23 April 1972	2 February 1973	285 days	17	5	0	12	29.41		
Roger Savage	England	3 February 1973	13 May 1978	5 years, 99 days	174	70	39	65	40.23	Sussex County League Division 1 Champions: 1976–77	
Melton "Taffy" Jones	Wales	4 July 1978	23 May 1979	323 days	30	10	6	14	33.33		
Keith Giles	England	23 May 1979	19 May 1980	362 days	30	13	9	8	43.33		
Peter Andrews	England	6 July 1980	30 June 1981	362 days	30	10	6	14	33.33		
Doug Pearson	England	6 July 1981	10 February 1982	219 days	15	3	2	10	20.00		
Roger Addems	England	10 February 1982	30 January 1984	1 year, 354 days	62	23	16	23	37.10		
Trevor Woods	England	30 January 1984	16 October 1986	2 years, 259 days	78	41	17	20	52.56	Sussex RUR Cup Winners: 1985–86	
Jeff Dyson †	England	17 October 1986	12 November 1986	27 days	0	0	0	0	—		
Brian 'Sammy' Donnelly	England	12 November 1986	8 May 1988	1 year, 178 days	55	29	15	11	52.73	Sussex RUR Cup Winners: 1986–87	
Godrey Stevens	England	9 May 1988	6 December 1988	211 days	12	3	3	6	25.00		
Derek Winterton †	England	6 December 1988	6 January 1989	31 days	4	1	1	2	25.00		
Jim Stevens	England	6 January 1989	20 September 1989	257 days	25	8	6	11	32.00		
Don Guy	England	20 September 1989	27 October 1991	2 years, 37 days	69	16	15	38	23.19		
Roger Cooper ‡	England	27 October 1991	3 May 1993	1 year, 188 days	62	18	7	37	29.03		
Peter Roberts	England	17 May 1993	20 December 1994	1 year, 217 days	16	2	4	10	12.50		
John Kemp	England	20 December 1994	19 April 1995	120 days	60	18	13	29	30.00		
John Lambert	England	14 June 1995	14 September 1995	92 days	6	1	0	5	16.67		
Rob Thorley ‡	England	16 September 1995	20 May 1996	247 days	32	11	4	17	34.38		
Peter Cherry	England	20 May 1996	21 May 2001	5 years, 1 day	190	66	47	77	34.74		
Dave Winterton	England	29 June 2001	4 January 2005	3 years, 189 days	124	71	22	31	57.26	Sussex County League Division 2 Runners-up: 2002–03	
Jon Purdey †	England	4 January 2005	22 January 2005	18 days	2	1	0	1	50.00		
Adrian Colwell	England	22 January 2005	30 December 2009	4 years, 342 days	192	86	38	68	44.79	Sussex County League Division 1 Champions: 2006–07	
Danny Bloor	England	30 December 2009	14 June 2013	3 years, 166 days	146	41	38	67	28.08		
Kevin Launden	England	14 June 2013	21 August 2013	68 days	4	0	1	3	0.00		
Tony Reid	England	22 August 2013	10 January 2014	141 days	20	3	6	11	15.00		
Brian 'Sammy' Donnelly †	England	10 January 2014	13 January 2014	3 days	1	0	1	0	0.00		
John Lambert (Note: 2019–20 & 2020-21 season stats for John Lambert included as some league games were played during the Covid-19 pandemic.)	England	13 January 2014	23 April 2022	8 years, 100 days	290	163	55	72	56.21	Sussex RUR Cup Winners: 2014–15	
Jude Macdonald	England	19 May 2022	21 November 2026	4 years, 186 days	160	76	29	55	47.50	Southern Combination Play-off Winners: 2023–24	
Steve Ives	England	22 November 2026	Present		0	0	0	0			

== Other teams ==
The club runs two other adult teams and two ladies teams:

- Eastbourne Town Reserve's competing in the Mid-Sussex Football League Championship
- Eastbourne Town Under 18's competing in the Isthmian Youth league
- Eastbourne Town Women, competing in the Sussex County Women and Girls Football League Premier Division

Eastbourne Town also run several other younger age group youth teams after a merger in 2010/11 with Old Town Boys F.C. who were established in 1983.

== Honours ==
=== First team ===
==== League ====
- Southern Amateur League

Division One Champions (2): 1922–23, 1925-26
Division One Runners Up (2): 1921–22, 1929–30
Division Two Champions (1): 1938–39
Section A Runners Up (1): 1919–20
Section B Runners Up (1): 1911–12

- Sussex County/Southern Combination League:

Premier Division Champions (2): 1976–77, 2006–07
Premier Division Runners Up (2): 2015–16, 2023–24
Play-off winners (1): 2023–24
Division 2 Runners Up (1): 2002-03

==== Cups (Domestic) ====
- Sussex Senior Challenge Cup:

Winners (12): 1889–90, 1890–91, 1893–94, 1894–95, 1898–99, 1899–1900,
1900–01, 1902–03, 1921–22, 1931–32, 1932–33, 1952–53
Runners Up (10): 1892–93, 1896-97, 1906-07, 1920-21, 1922-23, 1925-26,
1927-28, 1950-51, 1972-73, 1977-78

- The Sussex Royal Ulster Rifles Charity Cup

Winners (6): 1932–33, 1947–48, 1949–50, 1985–86, 1986–87, 2014–15
Runners Up (5): 1919–20, 1925–26, 1945–46, 1955–56, 1963–64

- Amateur Football Alliance Senior Cup:

Winners (2): 1921-22, 1924-25
Runners Up (2): 1922-23, 1923-24

- Amateur Football Alliance – Invitation Cup:

Winners (1): 1969–70

- Amateur Football Alliance – Veterans Challenge Cup

Winners (1): 1986–87

- Athenian League Challenge Cup:

Runners Up (1): 1975-76

- Borough Centenary Cup:

Winners (1) 1986

- East Sussex Challenge Cup:

Winners (1) 1920

- Eastbourne Charity Cup:

Winners (37) 1898, 1900, 1910, 1914, 1920, 1921, 1926, 1927, 1933, 1934, 1935, 1936, 1937, 1938, 1939, 1948, 1950, 1951, 1953, 1955, 1959, 1962, 1963, 1965, 1966, 1969, 1970, 1981, 1982, 1983, 1984, 1986, 1988, 1989, 2000, 2025

- John Gower Memorial Trophy:

Winners (1) 1990

- Maybank Cup:

Winners (1) 1988

- Newhaven Charity Cup:

Winners (1) 1949

- Round Table Trophy:

Winners (1) 1971

- Sussex County League – Division Two League Cup:

Runners-Up (1): 2001–02

==== Cups (International) ====
- Tournoi du Nouvel An Paris:

Winners (1): 1904

- Challenge International du Nord:

Winners (1): 1909

== Club records ==
- Record attendance: 7,378, FA Cup Qualifying v Hastings United, 1953–54
- Biggest Win: 14 - 1 v Moulscoomb Rovers, FA Amateur Cup, 30 September 1961
- Biggest Loss 0 - 10 v Ipswich Town, Southern Amateur League 30 April 1932
- Most points in a season: 86 in 38 games, Southern Combination Premier, 2015–16
- Fewest points in a season: 29 in 42 games, Isthmian League Division One South, 2009–10
- Best League Performance: Isthmian League Division One, 11th, 2012–13, 2025–26
- Best FA Cup performance: 4th Qualifying Round, 1946–47, 1950–51, 1967–68, 1968-69
- Best FA Trophy performance: 2nd Qualifying Round, 2026–27
- Best FA Vase performance: 5th round, 1975–76
- Best FA Amateur Cup performance: 3rd round, 1945–46, 1950-51

== Player records ==
=== Appearances ===
- Most overall appearances: 602 – Syd Myall (1962–1979)
- Most league appearances: 436 – Syd Myall (1962–1979)
- Most cup appearances: 166 – Syd Myall (1962–1979)

=== Goalscorers ===
- Record overall goal scorer: 207 – Guy Hollobone (1919–1928)
- Record league goal scorer: 125 – Gary Brockwell (1997–2010)
- Most goals in a season: 44 – Yemi Odubade (2002–03)
- Most league goals in a season: 36 – Yemi Odubade (2002–03)
- Most goals in a league match: 7 – Paddy Tracey, v Ealing Association, 5 January 1946
- Most goals in a cup match: 7 – Eric Farnfield, v East Grinstead Town, 27 December 1919

=== Other ===
- First player to earn international cap while at club:
  - Arthur Topham, for England, 12 March 1894
