= Danny Simmonds =

English footballer (born 1974)

Personal information
- Full name: Daniel Brian Simmonds
- Date of birth: 17 December 1974 (age 51)
- Place of birth: Eastbourne, England
- Position: Midfielder

Youth career
- Langney Sports
- Brighton & Hove Albion

Senior career*
| Years | Team | Apps | (Gls) |
| 1993–1995 | Brighton & Hove Albion | 23 | (0) |
| 1995–2003 | Hastings United | 373 | (88) |
| 2003–2006 | Eastbourne Borough | 128 | (9) |
| 2006 | Ashford Town (Kent) | 8 | (0) |
| 2006–2011 | Eastbourne Town | 158 | (22) |
| 2011 | Rye United | | |
| 2012–2013 | Eastbourne United Association | | |

Managerial career
- 2011–2012: Eastbourne Town (assistant)
- * Club domestic league appearances and goals as of 17:02, 22 March 2016 (UTC)

Daniel Brian Simmonds (born 17 December 1974) is an English former professional footballer. He played for Brighton & Hove Albion in the Football League, before playing non-league football for various clubs.

== Career ==
Simmonds played youth football for Langney Sports before signing for Brighton & Hove Albion. As a trainee he played against his former club in the 1992 Sussex Senior Cup final, before playing 18 times for Albion's first team in the Football League.

He then moved on to play non-league football for Hastings United and won the Southern League Division One East title with the club in 2001–02. In 2003, he was reunited with his former Hastings boss, Garry Wilson, at Eastbourne Borough and was part of the Borough team which won the Conference South play-off before losing the North/South Conference play-off final in 2004-05. He left Eastbourne late in the 2006 season and signed for Ashford Town (Kent). In 2006, Simmonds signed for Eastbourne Town. Here he was part of the championship winning team which gained promotion from the Sussex County League to the Isthmian League in 2006–07. In 2011, he signed for Rye United, before returning to Eastbourne Town as assistant manager for a short period. In 2012, he briefly resumed his playing career by signing for Eastbourne United Association.

== Honours ==
Hastings United (1995–2003)

- Sussex Senior Challenge Cup: 1995–96
- Southern League Division One East champions: 2001–02
- Southern League Cup runners-up: 1999–2000

Eastbourne Borough (2003–2006)

- Conference South: play-off winners 2004–05

Eastbourne Town (2006–2011)

- Sussex County League champions: 2006–07
