= Eastbourne F.C. =

Eastbourne F.C. may refer to:

- Eastbourne Borough F.C., in the Conference South league as of the 2013–14 season
- Eastbourne Town F.C., in the Isthmian League, Division One South as of the 2013–14 season, called Eastbourne F.C. until 1971
- Eastbourne United Association F.C., in the Sussex County League, Division Two as of the 2013–14 season
