= Darren Baker =

Darren Baker may refer to:

- Darren Baker (baseball) (born 1999), American second baseman
- Darren Baker (footballer) (born 1965), English midfielder
