= Eastbourne United A.F.C. =

Association football club in England

Eastbourne United
- Full name: Eastbourne United Association Football Club
- Nickname: United/Whites
- Founded: 2003
- Ground: The Oval, Eastbourne
- Coordinates: 50°46′52″N 0°18′19″E
- Chairman: Matt Thompson
- Manager: Anthony Storey
- League: Southern Combination Premier Division
- 2025–26: Southern Combination Premier Division, 6th of 20
- Website: https://www.eastbourneunitedafc.com/
Home colours	Away colours

Eastbourne United A.F.C. is a football club based in Eastbourne, England. The club was formed in 2003 following a merger between Eastbourne United F.C. and Shinewater Association. In 2009, the club won the Sussex County League title for the first time in 53 years, 18 years after leaving the Isthmian League. They are currently members of the Southern Combination Premier Division.

== History ==
=== Eastbourne United ===
Eastbourne United AFC's roots can be traced back to 1894, when the club was founded as the 1st Sussex Royal Engineers FC. In this early period the club played nearby to where the Saffrons (home of Eastbourne Town) now stands, and at the South Lynn ground in Tutts Barn Road, the site of their ground at this time is now covered by the St. Thomas a Beckett RC Primary School. The club then changed ground again in 1901 when Eastbourne Council gave the club permission to use Gildredge Park. The club then changed its name in 1913 to 1st Home Counties Royal Engineers (Eastbourne) FC to reflect a merger between the RA Volunteers with the Territorial Army.

After the War the club continued to play at Gildredge park and in 1920 the club name was changed to Eastbourne Royal Engineers Old Comrades as the Volunteers disbanded due to the end of the war. During their first season as Eastbourne Royal Engineers Old Comrades the club reached the final of the East Sussex Cup beating the Royal Corps of Signals, the game however may be notable as the first ever outside broadcast of a sporting event in England as the Signals brought wireless equipment with them to send match reports back to their camp in Maresfield.

The club joined the Sussex County League in 1921 and made a permanent move from Gildredge Park to their Lynchmere ground. In 1922 they changed their name again when ties with the Royal Engineers were broken and dropped the "Royal Engineers" part of the name, Eastbourne Old Comrades FC and started wearing the white and black stripes on their shirts. At the end of the 1927–28 season they broke away from the Sussex County League and joined the Spartan League, shortening their name to Eastbourne Comrades FC. They left the Spartan league at the end of the 1931–32 season and joined the Brighton, Hove & District League. They won Division One in 1932–33 and were runners-up the following season. In 1935 they re-joined the Sussex County League. After the end of the Second World War they rejoined the Sussex County League for the 1946–47 season. During this period, the club experienced difficult times. They moved to their current home, The Oval, after losing their Lynchmere Ground to development and could only manage mediocre league results. In 1951 the name was changed for a sixth time to Eastbourne United FC.

The club's fortunes changed with the new name and a new coach, George Smith, and between 1953 and 1956 they were twice County League champions, and runners-up once. That success saw them move into the Metropolitan & District League in 1956 (subsequently the Metropolitan League), and in 1964 United joined Division Two of the Athenian League, winning the championship in 1966–67.

Two seasons later, another promotion followed (as runners-up) and United were promoted to the Premier Division. After just one season though, they were relegated back to Division One. However, in 1973–74 the League was re-organised and the Premier Division scrapped.

In 1975 United were relegated to Division Two, and when the Athenian League was disbanded in 1977, joined Division Two of the Isthmian League, and subsequently Division Two (South) following reorganisation in 1984. When further changes to the Isthmian structure were made in 1991, United found themselves in the new Division Three and after one season, opted to rejoin the County League.

=== Shinewater Association ===
Shinewater Association was formed in 1990 as a replacement team for the Dental Estimates Board and a member of the East Sussex Football League, being based at the Temple Grove Playing field in the Old Town. Relocating to the Shinewater Lane playing field as the Shinewater Association Club were looking to form a football team. The club was accepted into the Sussex County League Division Three. Facilities at the time were basic, sharing the wooden pavilion building with a local cricket club. In 1992 the pavilion was destroyed in an arson attack and the cricket club relocated to The Saffrons taking the insurance money with them leaving the club with financial difficulties. A grant was secured from the Football Foundation and players were allowed to change in the association club build 400 yards away whilst a new clubhouse was being built. The new clubhouse was opened during the 1992–93 season and the cricket club moved back in, along with the money to improve the clubhouse which had not followed building regulations.

In the 1996–97 season the team saw promotion into the Second Division giving Eastbourne a fourth senior club. In years afterwards the ground saw continued vandalism, vehicles left on the pitch and set fire to and drainage problems to the pitch. In 2003 a proposal with Eastbourne United was sought and agreed in April 2003.

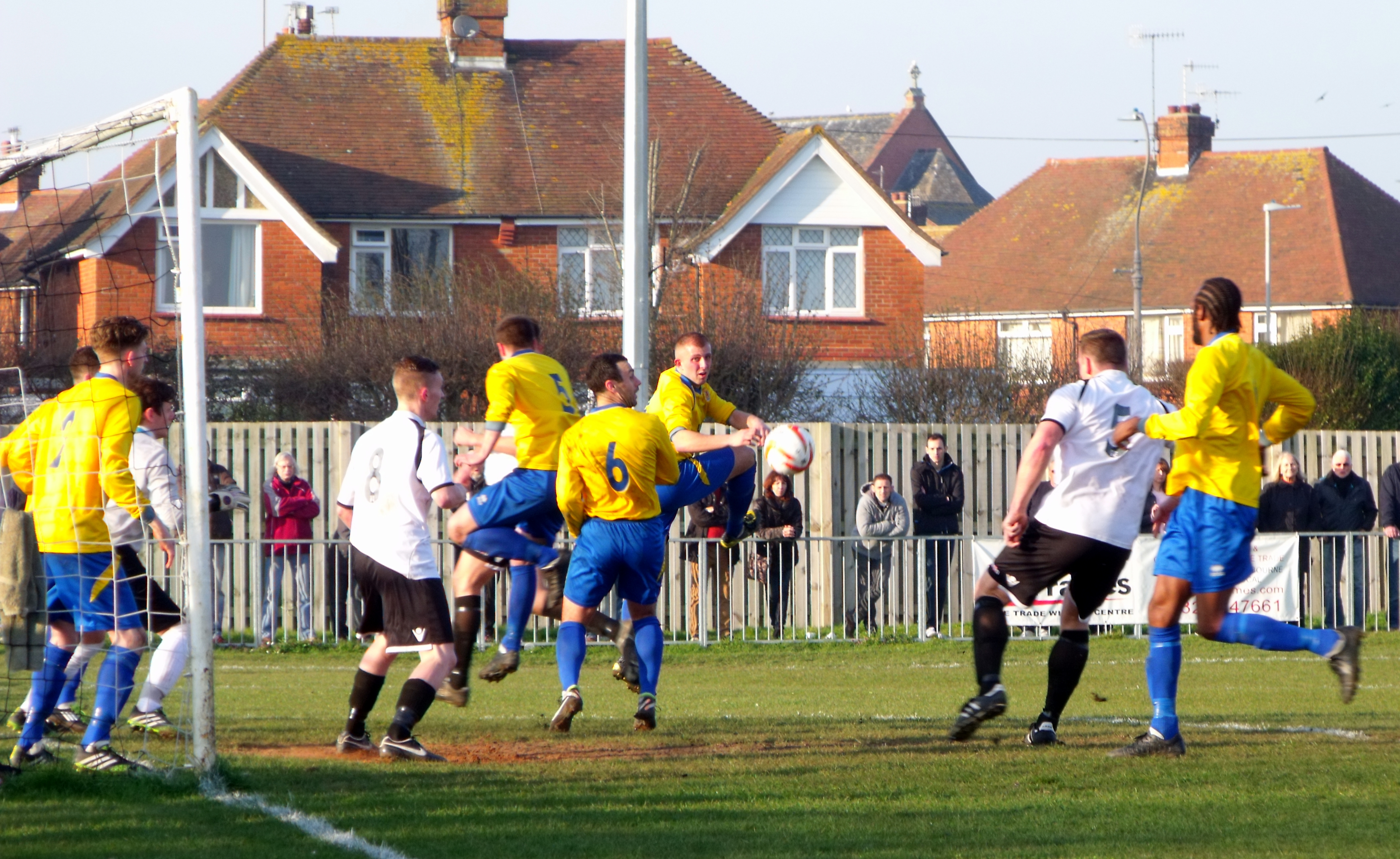
United v Ampthill in the FA Vase March 2014

Placed in Division Two of the County League they struggled initially and in 1996 came perilously close to dropping down into intermediate football after finishing bottom. They recovered however, and within two years had won promotion to Division One as runners-up to East Preston. In 2001–02 however, United were relegated once more.

=== Merged club ===
The decision was made to amalgamate with fellow Division Two club Shinewater Association FC at the end of the 2002–03 season. A terrible playing surface at Shinewater's ground in Shinewater Lane, and failure to gain permission to erect the floodlights necessary to advance any further, made it difficult to attract players of sufficient quality in a town where they were already at a premium. In addition, the ground was subject to constant vandalism.

Under the leadership of former Shinewater manager Dave Shearing, the new club won promotion back to Division One at the first attempt after finishing third behind champions Littlehampton Town, and runners-up Worthing United. That progression was maintained in 2004–05 with another excellent campaign and 5th place in the top flight of the County League. With constant rumours of disquiet off the pitch in the local media, Shearing resigned at the end of the 2005–06 season to take a break from football (he subsequently joined Bexhill United), with the Club in 14th position. He was succeeded by former Hailsham Town boss Brian Dennis.

Dennis brought success to Eastbourne United at the end of the 2008–09 season when they lifted the RUR cup for the first time since 1956 and also reached the top of the table, but the Sussex FA had spotted that Chichester City had fielded a banned player in their squad and were deducted points, the Sussex FA had talks whether to award points to sides who have played against a team fielding an ineligible player, which would mean Horsham YMCA would be promoted. However the Sussex FA declared that no points were to be given back and United were the Sussex County League champions, for the first time since 1956 giving Eastbourne United the double.

After the end of the 2009–10 season, the Eastbourne United AFC committee took the decision to focus all their efforts on the proposed redevelopment of The Oval, which meant the playing budget was cut and as a result the majority of the first team squad left. Brian Dennis left his role as manager in October 2010 and was replaced by then Reserve Team manager Paul Daubeney. Daubeney couldn't save United from relegation to Division Two however as the club was only able to muster 10 points from their 38 league games. The club remained in Division Two of the Sussex County League Until the 2013/14 Season, when under new manager Simon Rowland they were promoted as champions to Sussex County League Division one. During the 2013/14 promotion season, Rowland's men also had a long FA Vase run, ending only in defeat at the semi-final stage, losing 2–4 to Sholing F.C.

=== 2018 to present ===
On 30 October 2018 chairman Brian Cordingley stepped down after two years and was replaced by Hastings-based businessman Billy Wood on 3 November. A few days later Wood announced a five-year plan to bring the club into the modern era, involving redeveloping the Oval, bringing the club into the Isthmian league and to gain more support for Eastbourne United Association. In February 2019, the Chairman Billy Wood announced Eastbourne United were to re-brand their home kit and club badge to reflect on their 125th year. In December Wood signed Arron Hopkison as the new Manager. The club were just on 2 points in the league having lost twelve games in a row. Saturday 27 April, the last day of the season, United were still bottom of the league on goal difference but won their last game away at Pagham completed the 'Great Escape' with a winner in the last minutes which took them out of the relegation zone and safely finishing the season 18th on goal difference to Arundel, who were relegated into Division One.

For the 2019–20 season, Billy Wood stated that the club were aiming to finish in the top 6 of the league, but after a poor start and sitting near the bottom of the table, Aaron Hopkinson resigned as manager on 10 September. His assistant Matthew Crabb took over as caretaker manager which became a permanent position ten days later.| Wood resigned as chairman on 17 September 2019 to become CEO of nearby Hastings United and Brian Cordingley resumed his position as chairman. Matt Crabb resigned as first team manager on 19 October 2020, which assistant manager Ray Collier stepped in to take over as first team manager.

== Colours ==
In the early history of the club, The 1st Sussex Royal Engineers kit was similar to the Royal Engineers but using stripes instead of hoops (the colours of red and blue being the regimental colours). The same kit colours were used for just over 55 years until the 1950–51 season where the club renamed itself as Eastbourne United and went to playing in white shirts and black shorts. In February 2019, Billy Wood, the chairman of the club announced a new kit for the 2019–20 season to celebrate the clubs 125-year history.

Royal Engineers, 1894-1950	Eastbourne United. 1950-2019	125 years, 2019–2020

== Ground ==
=== Gildredge Park 1901–1921 ===
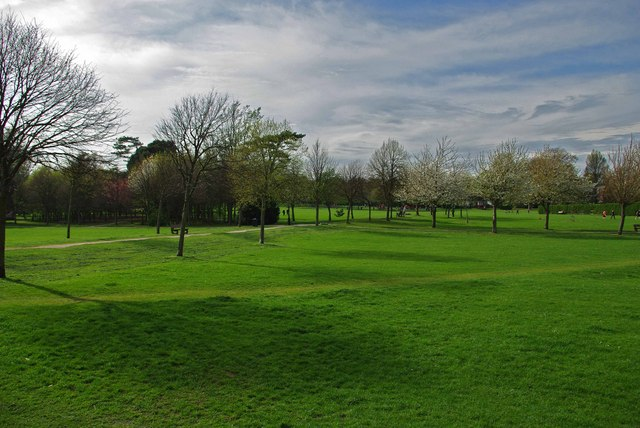
Gildredge Park

Having no official home until 1901, The 1st Royal Sussex Engineers, played their games at various locations such as Sheffield Park. In 1901 the club gained permission from Eastbourne Council to use Gildredge Park in the Old Town as their home ground. Although not enclosed, the entrance was a voluntary donation of one penny. The pitch was given the nickname of 'The Switchback' due to the undulating playing surface.

=== Lynchmere 1921–1947 ===
The team, now named for the third time as Eastbourne Royal Engineers Old Comrades, moved to the Lynchmere Ground opposite Tutts Barn Lane. The first game played was the East Sussex Cup Final against the Royal Corps of Signals, also said to be the first ever outside broadcast sporting event in the country when the Royal Corps of Signals brought wireless equipment to relay news of the event back to their base in Maresfield Camp. Materials from the Eastbourne Aviation Company and Southern Railway to enclose the pitch was completed by the help of volunteers, ready for the start of the 1921–22 Sussex County League season. The pitch was said to have a pronounced slope. By 1928, the club left the Sussex County League and joined the Spartan League and at this time the ground had a wooden grandstand and another enclosed structure built ready for their first game versus Colchester Town, now called Colchester United. Returning to the Sussex County league in 1935, the ground was hired out to a circus in the 1936 close season making the pitch unplayable until the end of October.

By the end of World War II, Lynchmere had a new owner and future tenancy was uncertain. The ground was used by the Army in the war and was kept in good condition, although the seating was removed and the buildings badly damaged the club tried to claim compensation from the War Office. Which was refused as the ground was not officially commandeered and the club had no money. The 1946–47 season was to be the last at the Lynchmere, the last game played was 11 January 1947 against Haywards Heath. An "arctic winter" intervened and the ground was sold for development. The site is now occupied by Thomas a Beckett School.

=== Shinewater Lane 1990–2003 ===
The Shinewater Playing field in Langney, Eastbourne was currently being used by Stone Cross Cricket Club who were looking for another team to share the ground at the same time the Shinewater Association Club were looking to form a team. In 1990 Shinewater Association Football Club moved in and entered the East Sussex Football League. Facilities were very basic, players changing in a small wooden pavilion. The pavilion caught fire in 1992 and the Cricket Club relocated to The Saffrons cricket pitch, taking the insurance money with them. Shinewater Association received a grant from the Football Foundation to build a new clubhouse which was opened by the Mayor during the 1992–93 football season, although planning permission was granted – it was noted that building regulations had not been followed and £11,000 of remedial work need to be done. The money for this was paid out by the cricket club who moved back in.

In 1997 the pitch was fully enclosed to meet ground grading for the Sussex County League Division Two as well as dugouts and a breeze block and steel cover. Vandalism and pitch drainage problems where a common concern with Shinewater Lane in later years. Permission was later sought to install floodlights which was declined as parking would cause a problem during evening games. The last game for Shinewater Association was against Eastbourne United just as the two clubs signed a merger and moved to The Oval. In later years Langney Wanderers used Shinewater Lane before relocating to Priory Lane.

=== The Oval 1947–present ===
The Oval in 2006, remains of the running track can be seen

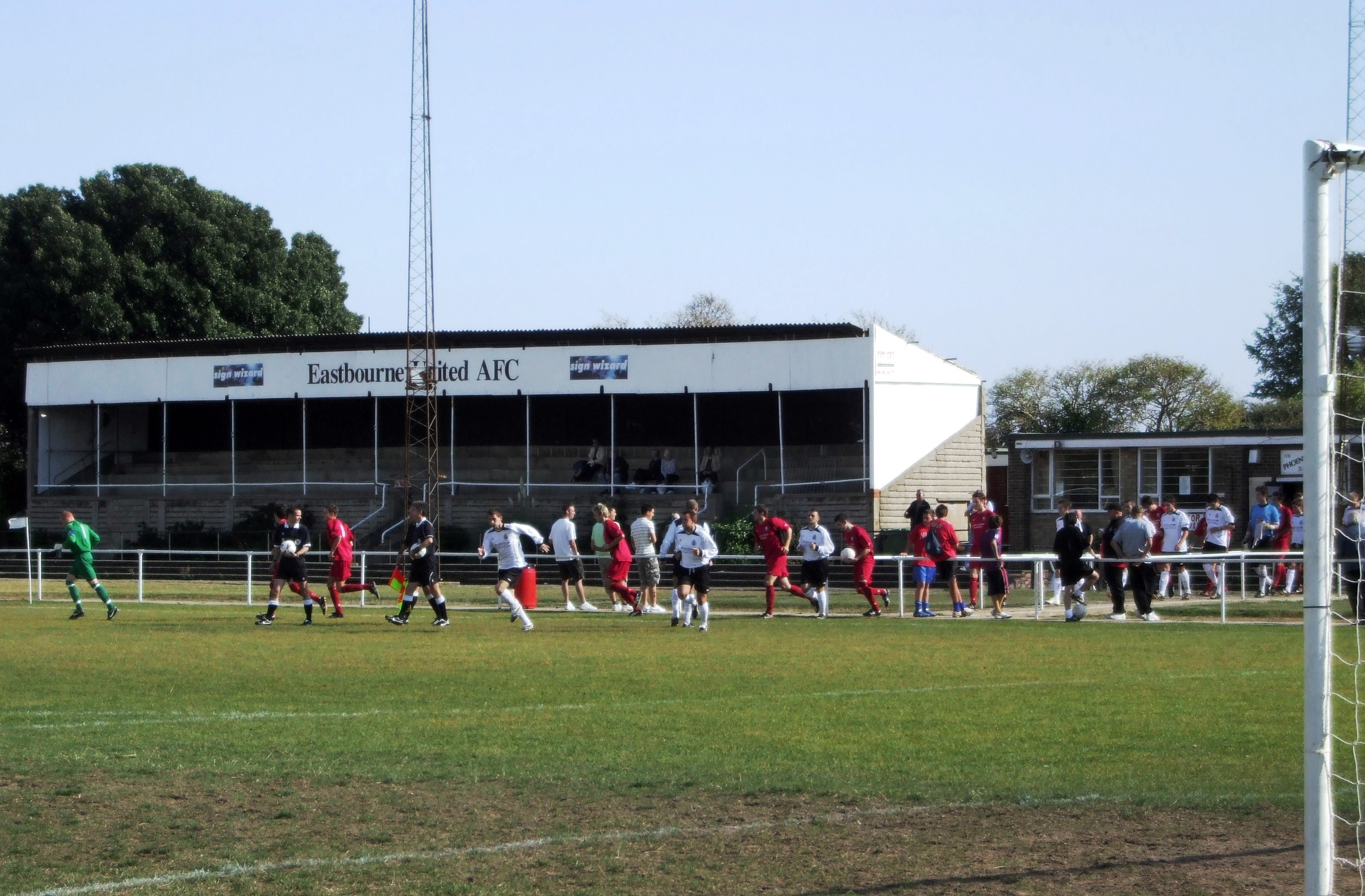
The grandstand in 2007 before demolition

The club have played at the Oval on Channel View Road since 1947. The area was originally known as the Gilbert Recreation Ground and now called Princes Park, which was owned by the local council, who invited Eastbourne Old Comrades to play there.. The council at the time were developing it into a sports arena with an athletics track and a grass cycle track surrounding the grass pitch. Plans were made in 1951 to build a stand and a terrace, which was opened in September 1955 when Eastbourne United hosted a game against Queens Park Rangers.

Floodlights were first installed in 1958 and inaugurated with a match versus Eastbourne F.C. in front of a gate of 4,100. More floodlights were supplemented in 1966 when Eastbourne United were playing in the Athenian League; these were installed at a cost of £5,500 and were officially turned on 25 October 1967 with a friendly game with West Ham United. A third set of floodlights was officially opened on 18 February 1980 by former manager Ron Greenwood with another friendly game with Millwall.

The great storm in 1987 destroyed one of the covered terraces; this was not repaired as the council's insurance did not cover storm damage. The local athletics club left the site in 2003 to a new facility to the north of the town. Today the perimeter fencing now surrounds the pitch; this was bought from nearby Eastbourne Borough's ground at Priory Lane when they improved their facilities. The new fencing has allowed spectators to watch the game nearer to the pitch than they used to. A few years later the terraced stand was demolished, awaiting plans for a new structure to be built.

The ground had a £100,000 investment over the 2011–12 season, to bring it up to Sussex County League standards and is now equipped with new perimeter fencing, concrete walkways and a 113-seater stand. The new improved ground was officially opened with a friendly game against Brighton & Hove Albion on 25 July 2012.

In November 2018, Chairman Billy Wood, announced a five-year plan to redevelop the grounds facilities to attract spectators.

== Management history ==
Below is a list of Eastbourne United Association F.C. managers since 2003

Name	From	To	Time in Charge	Achievements	Notes
(England) Dave Shearing	January 2003	4 May 2006	3 years, 123 days	–	
(England) Brian Dennis	5 May 2006	13 October 2010	7 years, 8 days	Sussex County League Division 1 Champions: 2008–09; Sussex RUR Cup Winners: 2008–09	
(England) Paul Daubeney	13 October 2010	14 May 2013	2 years, 213 days	-	
(England) Simon Rowland	30 May 2013	28 September 2015	2 years, 121 days	Sussex County League Division 2 Champions: 2013–14	
(England) Tobi Hutchinson	28 September 2015	31 July 2018	2 years, 306 days	–	
(England) Ryan Cooper	2 August 2018	16 December 2018	136 days	–	
(England) Aaron Hopkinson	17 December 2018	10 September 2019	267 days	–	
(England) Matthew Crabb	20 September 2019	19 October 2020	1 year, 29 days	–	
(England) Ray Collier	19 October 2019	8 September 2021	324 days	–	
(England) Anthony Storey	14 September 2021	Present	5 years, 61 days	–	

=== Notable former coaches ===
1. Managers/Coaches that have played/managed in the football league or any foreign equivalent to this level (i.e. fully professional league).
2. Managers/Coaches with full international caps.
- (England) Ron Greenwood
- (England) Gordon Jago
- (England) George Smith 1952–55
- (England) Jack Mansell
- (England) Micky French (Swindon Town)

== Honours ==
=== League honours ===
- Sussex County League Division One:
  - Champions (3): 1954–55, 1955–56, 2008–09
  - Runners-up (3): 1922–23, 1926–27, 1953–54
- Sussex County League Division Two:
  - Champions (1): 2013–14
  - Runners-up (1): 1997–98
- Sussex County League Division Three:
  - Runners-up (1): 1996–97^{†}
- Athenian League Division One:
  - Runners-up (1): 1968–69
- Athenian League Division Two:
  - Champions (1): 1966–67
- East Sussex League:
  - Champions (3): 1920–21, 1991–92^{†}, 1996–97^{†}
- Brighton, Hove & District League:
  - Champions (1): 1932–33

=== Cup honours ===
- Sussex Senior Challenge Cup:
  - Winners (6): 1959–60, 1962–63, 1963–64, 1965–66, 1966–67, 1968–69
  - Runners-up (6): 1929–30, 1955–56, 1956–57, 1961–62, 1970–71, 1989–90
- The Sussex Royal Ulster Rifles Charity Cup:
  - Winners (2): 1955–56, 2008–09
  - Runners-up (1): 1954–55
- The John O'Hara League Challenge Cup:
  - Winners (1): 1950–51
  - Runners-up (1): 1951–52
- Sussex Intermediate Cup:
  - Winners (3): 1965–66, 1968–69, 1995–96^{†}
- Metropolitan League Cup:
  - Winners (1): 1959–60
- Metropolitan League Amateur Cup:
  - Winners (1): 1960–61
- Sussex County League Division Three Cup:
  - Winners (1): 1995–96^{†}
  - Runners-up (1): 1996–97^{†}
- East Sussex Cup:
  - Winners (2): 1920–21, 1937–38
- Sussex Royal Engineers Challenge Shield:
  - Winners (3): 1901–02, 1903–04, 1905–06
- Eastbourne Charity Cup:
  - Winners (12): 1931–32, 1937–38, 1939–40, 1966–67, 1967–68, 1971–72, 1973–74, 1978–79, 1982–83, 1983–84, 1984–85, 1997–98^{†}
- Newhaven Charity Cup:
  - Winners (1): 1951–52
- Bognor Charity Cup:
  - Winners (1): 1925–26
- Bexhill Charity Cup:
  - Winners (1): 1920–21
- Hastings Charity Cup:
  - Winners (2): 1927–28, 1931–32
- Baldwin Cup:
  - Winners (1): 1950/51
- Borough Centeanery Cup:
  - Winners (1): 1985–86
- Seaford Centenary Cup:
  - Winners (1): 1991–92^{†}
- College Cup:
  - Winners (4): 1953–54, 1954–55, 1955–56, 1959–60
- Eastbourne Challenge Cup:
  - Winners (8): 1964–65, 1991–92^{†}, 1993–94^{†}, 1994–95^{†}, 1996–97^{†}, 1997–98^{†}, 2010–11, 2011–12

^{†} Shinewater Association F.C. Honour

== Records ==
=== Club Records ===
- Highest League Position: 4th in Isthmian League Division Two 1979–80
- F.A Cup best Performance: Fourth qualifying round 1966–67, 1978–79
- F.A. Vase best performance: Semi-final 2013–14
- Highest Attendance: 6,600 vs Eastbourne 7 May 1956
- Record Win: 15–0 vs Southdown Athletic 13 September 1933

=== Player Records ===
- Record Appearances: 367 – Reg Pope 1953–1965
- Record Goal Scorer: 168 – Tom Barrow 1925–1938
- Most Goal in a season: 63 – John Pooley 1955–56

== Notable former players ==
1. Players that have played/managed in the football league or any foreign equivalent to this level (i.e. fully professional league).
2. Players with full international caps.
- (England) Dave Bacuzzi
- (Denmark) Henrik Jensen
- (England) Leon Legge
- (England) Stuart Myall
- (England) Eric Whitington
- (England) Danny Simmonds
- (Solomon Islands) Rovu Boyers
