= Garry Wilson (Scottish footballer) =

Scottish footballer and manager

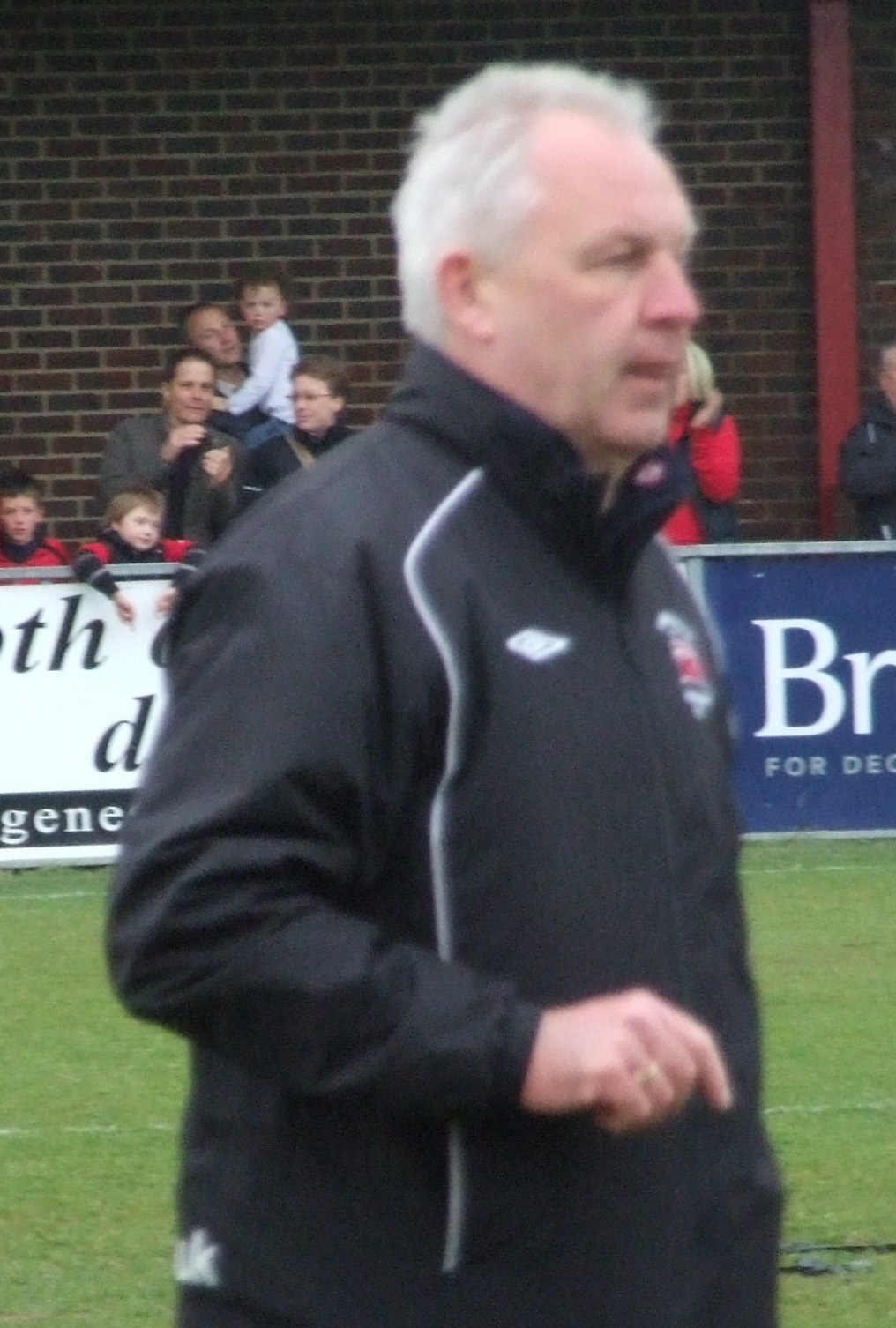

Personal information
- Date of birth: 25 March 1963 (age 63)
- Place of birth: Glasgow, Scotland
- Position: Defender

Youth career
- –1983: Campsie Black Watch

Senior career*
Years	Team	Apps	(Gls)
1983–1985	Queen's Park	31	(0)
1985–1986	Kirkintilloch Rob Roy	?	(?)
1986–1988	Stranraer	52	(1)
1988–	Hastings Town	?	(?)

International career
1980	Scotland U18	1	(0)

Managerial career
- 1995–1998: Hastings Town
- 1999–2012: Eastbourne Borough
- 2012–2013: Eastbourne Town (assistant)
- 2013–2015: Lewes
- 2015–2016: Hastings United
- * Club domestic league appearances and goals as of 00:00, 18 November 2008 (UTC)

Garry Wilson (born 25 March 1963 in Glasgow) is a Scottish former footballer and manager. As a player, he appeared for Queen's Park, Stranraer and gained a Scottish Under-18 cap. He is most known for his time as manager of Eastbourne Borough, spending 13 years at the helm. In his time at the club he won several promotions, taking the club from the Sussex County League to the Conference National.

== Playing career ==
Garry started his playing career with a youth team called Campsie Black Watch and at the age of 20 joined Scottish Second Division side Queens Park as an amateur in which he spent two years before joining Kirkintilloch Roy Rob for a season where he headed to south west Scotland to semi-professional Scottish Second Division side Stranraer. After two seasons with Stranraer, he moved south to non-league Hastings Town, playing in the Southern League Southern Division. Shortly after joining Hastings, he suffered a serious leg fracture whilst playing in a match against Witney Town which ended his playing career.

== Managerial career ==
=== Hastings Town ===
After fracturing his leg he became the reserve team manager for Hastings Town moving up the ranks to first team manager in March 1995 at the young age of 32. Leading Hastings to win the Southern League Cup (1995) and Sussex Senior Cup (1996), before being sacked in January 1998 after losing in the F.A. Trophy against Bath City.

=== Eastbourne Borough ===
Garry joined St Leonards as Assistant Manager before joining Eastbourne Borough, then known as Langney Sports, in February 1999 taking over from caretaker manager Nick Greenwood, who became his assistant manager. In his first full season at Langney he led the team to win the Sussex County League and playing in the Southern League Eastern Division for the first time in the team's history. Two seasons later he led them into the Southern League Premier Division winning a place in the newly formed Conference South. Gaining fifth place in the first season, Garry saw the team enter the play-off final for the Conference National at Stoke's Brittania Stadium, but lost to Altrincham.

In 2008, again Garry brought the team into the play-off final for a place in the Conference National and won 2–0 to Hampton & Richmond Borough at Stevenage.

February 2009 was Garry's 10th anniversary with Eastbourne Borough and working with Nick Greenwood, stating when he joined in 1999 that he'd get Eastbourne from the County Leagues into the Football Conference, a feat he never thought he'd achieve, and now hoping to reach the Football League before he retires. He also has a son called Liam Wilson and a wife called Sally Wilson.

After a difficult 2009/10 season Wilson managed to keep Eastbourne up on the final day by beating Oxford United 1–0 with an 84th-minute penalty from Simon Weatherstone. 2010/11 was equally difficult as Eastbourne found it difficult cope with a part-time outfit in a virtually full-time league, and on many occasions Wilson found himself with his hands tied. Eastbourne were relegated a few weeks before the end of the season (the first since Wilson took over 12 years earlier and after 4 promotions) despite a few spirited performances and results late on which was similar to their good early season form. Wilson was very close to leaving the job several times, including after the 4–1 home defeat to Tamworth, and it was rumoured that Steve King was ready to be his replacement. However this didn't materialise and Wilson was confirmed staying for the 2011/12 season along with his long term assistant Nick Greenwood in April 2011, much to the satisfaction of many connected to the club, this was despite agreeing to depart the club when they plan to go full-time in a few seasons because of work commitments.

Garry left the club on 17 January 2012 following an inconsistent start to the season and with the team struggling for form. At the time of his exit Boro stood in 16th position in the Conference South.

After a short break from management, Garry was appointed assistant manager at Eastbourne Town on 25 September 2012.

=== Lewes ===
Wilson was appointed manager of Eastbourne Borough's local rivals Lewes in late May 2013, replacing Simon Wormull. On being appointed Wilson said, "I am thrilled to be joining such a progressive club. It's going to be an exciting challenge and one we are all looking forward to. I've been mightily impressed with all I've seen and heard at the Dripping Pan and I cannot wait to get started." On 17 February 2015 Wilson, his assistant manager Danny Bloor and first team coach Dean Lightwood departed Lewes by mutual consent.

=== Hastings United ===
Garry Wilson was appointed manager of Hastings United in May 2015. Wilson issued the following statement in reaction to his appointment: "I am very much looking forward to returning to the club where it all started for me in England, and where I believe that I have unfinished business." Garry resigned from Hastings on 23 April 2016 after narrowly missing out on the play-offs.

== Honours ==
=== Managerial ===
==== Hastings United (1995–1998) ====
- Sussex Senior Challenge Cup: 1995/96
- Southern League Cup: 1995

==== Eastbourne Borough (1999-17 Jan 2012) ====
- Sussex Senior Cup: 2001/02, 2008/09
- Sussex County League Champions: 1999/2000
- Southern League Eastern Division: Runner Up 2002/03
- Conference South: Play-off winners 2004/05, 2007/08

==== Individual ====
- Conference South Manager of the Month: February 2005, September 2007
