= Henrik Jensen (footballer, born 1978) =

Danish footballer

Personal information
- Date of birth: 1 February 1978 (age 48)
- Place of birth: Vejle, Denmark
- Height: 6 ft 1 in (1.85 m)
- Position: Defender

Senior career*
Years	Team	Apps	(Gls)
- Fredericia KFUM
- Eastbourne United
2003	Vejle Boldklub	4	(0)
2004	Charleston Battery	24	(0)
2005–2006	FC Fredericia		
2007	Kristiansund BK		
- Vinding SF
Total		28	(0)

Managerial career
- 2009–: Gauerslund IF
- * Club domestic league appearances and goals

Henrik Jensen (born 1 February 1978) is a Danish former professional footballer who played as a defender in Denmark, England and the United States.

== Career ==
Born in Vejle, Jensen started his career with Fredericia KFUM, before moving to Eastbourne United in England. He returned to Denmark to play for Vejle Boldklub in 2003, before joining United States team Charleston Battery in 2004. He signed for Danish club FC Fredericia in February 2005. When his contract expired in December 2006, he moved to Norwegian club Kristiansund BK in January 2007. He ended his career with lower-league Danish club Vinding SF.

He returned to Gauerslund in 2009, in order to coach the local lower-league team.

== Personal life ==
Jensen got his nickname of "Gauer" from his childhood hometown of Gauerslund halfway between Vejle and Fredericia.
