= Princes Park, Eastbourne =

Park in Eastbourne, East Sussex, United Kingdom

Coordinates: 50°46′46″N 0°18′24″E

The Oval

Princes Park in Eastbourne, East Sussex, England, is a 33-acre (13 ha) public park 1 mile (1.6 km) east of Eastbourne Town Centre and the Victorian seafront.

The park consists of an 18 hole putting green, a bowling green, a boating lake (known as Crumbles Pond) and 2 small children's play areas, one of which has a paddling pool. There is also a football ground within the park, known as The Oval, which is the home of Eastbourne United A.F.C., and a playing field which hosts travelling funfairs and circuses several times per year.

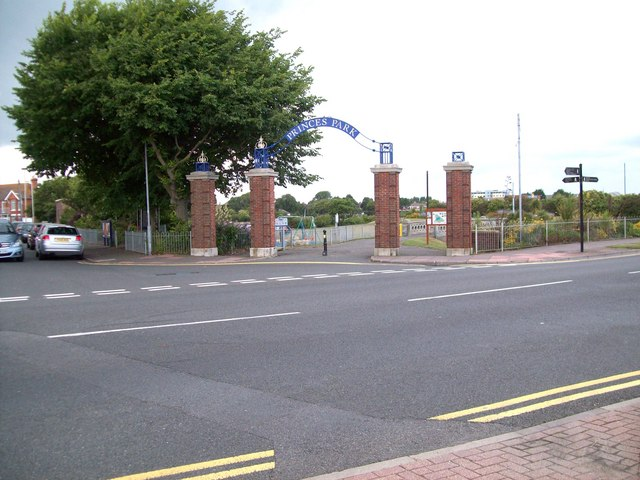
Park entrance

The park was originally called Gilbert's Recreation Ground, named after the land owner, and was leased to Eastbourne Borough Council in 1907. On 30 June 1931, King Edward VIII, at that time the Prince of Wales, visited the park and planted an Evergreen Oak; the park was shortly after renamed Prince's Park in his honour.

In the mid 1940s the local council was looking to develop part of the park into a sports arena with an athletics track and grass cycle track, and in 1946 Eastbourne Old Comrades Football Club was invited to play their games at the ground after their original ground, called Lynchmere was sold for redevelopment.

In the 1970s Eastbourne Borough played their home games on the playing field here before moving to Priory Lane.
