= Priory Lane =

Stadium in Eastbourne, England

Coordinates: 50°48′15″N 0°19′15″E

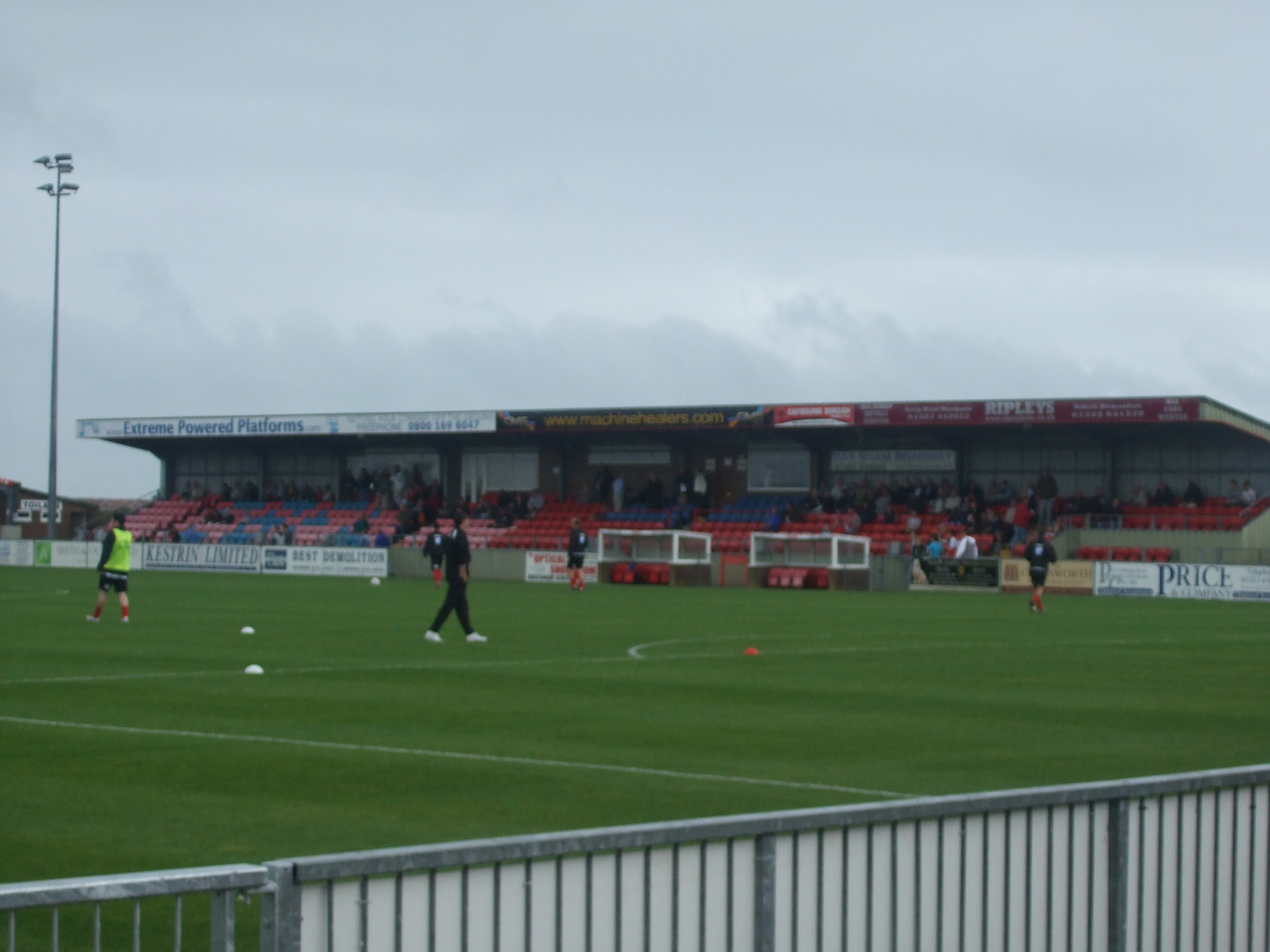
- Main Stand
- Interactive map of Priory Lane
- Full name: The Connect Management Stadium
- Location: Priory Lane, Langney, Eastbourne, East Sussex, England; BN23 7QH
- Owner: Langney Sports Club
- Capacity: 4,151
- Field size: 110 × 75 yards

Construction
- Built: 1988
- Opened: 1988

Tenants
- Eastbourne Borough F.C. (1983–present); Langney Wanderers F.C. (2017–2021)

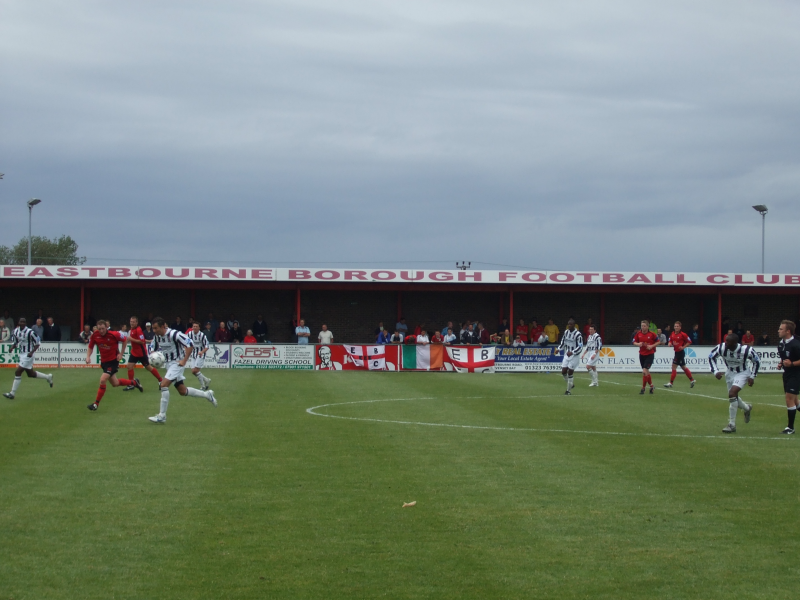
Peter Fountain Stand

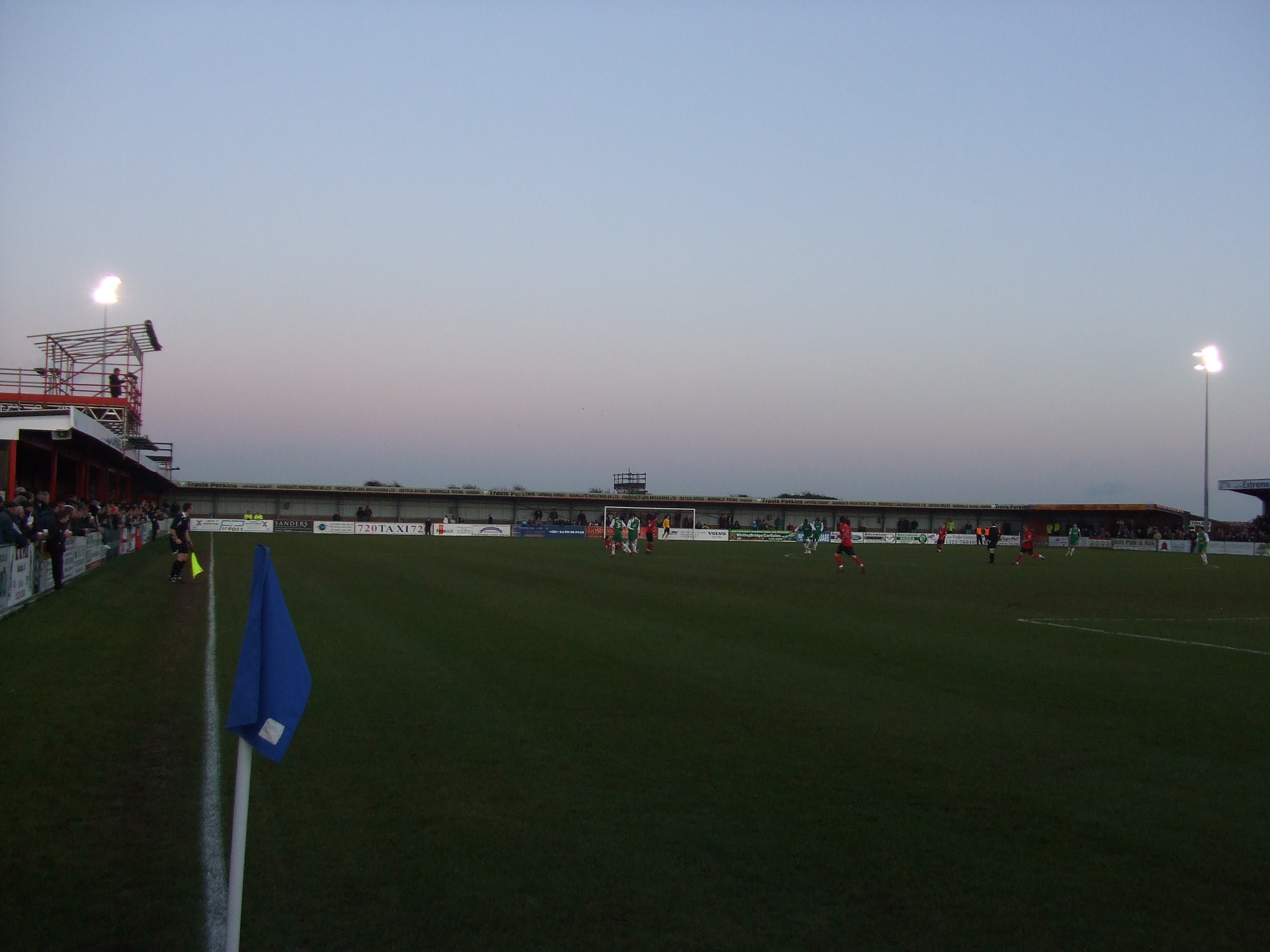
River End Stand

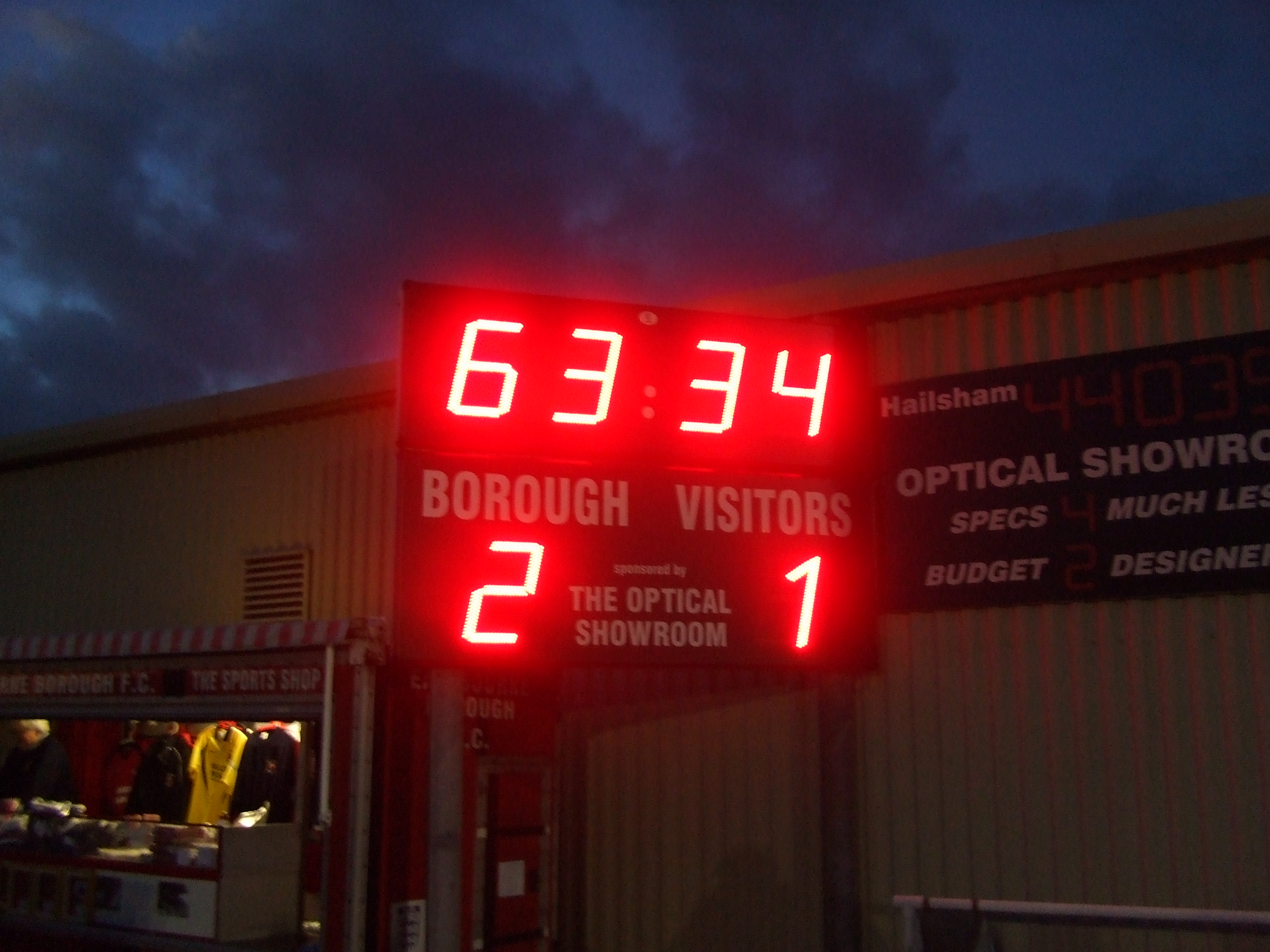
Scoreboard

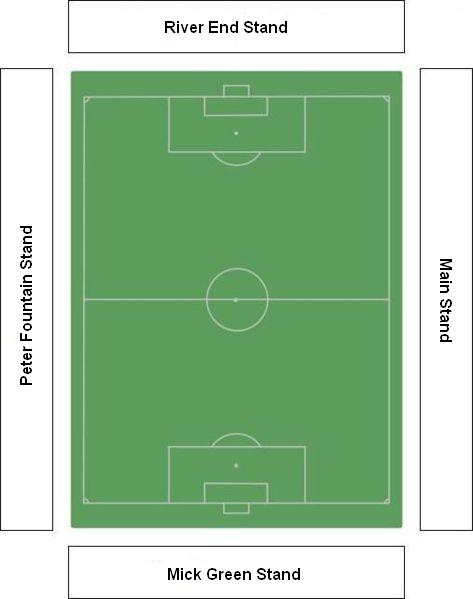
Plan of Priory Lane

Priory Lane is an association football stadium located in Langney, an eastern suburb of Eastbourne, East Sussex, England. It is the home of Eastbourne Borough, who play in the Isthmian Premier Division. Eastbourne Borough have used the stadium since moving from the playing fields at Princes Park in 1983.

== History ==
Building commenced in 1983 when the club, having just joined the Sussex County Football League, leased a playing field and built a garage to store equipment. The first competitive match played at Priory Lane was against East Preston on 15 September 1984, a match which the Sports won 1–0. At this time, the team played on the pitch in front of the modern stadium site. The club has played on the current pitch since 1988.

Over the years, the ground has undergone extensive development, including piping a tunnel and installing its own pumping station for drainage. The Peter Fountain Stand was the first stand to be built in 1989 and was named after the man who supplied the labour. It was later extended in the early 1990s as Langney Sports progressed through the Sussex County League.

Before the construction of the Mick Green Stand, there was a raised mound where spectators had excellent views of the pitch. The Mick Green Stand was built in 1995 ahead of the 1995–96 season and commemorates former club captain Mick Green, who was killed in a building accident in 1994. The stand contains the players' dressing rooms and a tea bar on the ground floor, with hospitality suites located upstairs.

Construction of the Main Stand began during the 1999–2000 season. Following funding from the Football Foundation in March 2001 and promotion to the Conference National in 2008, it was expanded to its current capacity.

Part of the stadium complex includes the Langney Sports Club, which is open to non-members on selected matchdays, as well as an indoor bowls centre, archery facilities, and tennis courts.

In 2007, a rent dispute with the local council created concern that Eastbourne Borough could lose the stadium after the council attempted to increase the annual rent from £3,000 to £17,000. The supporters' club responded by collecting over 1,000 signatures in a petition.

In June 2009, the FA confirmed that Priory Lane met the requirements for a Grade A stadium, although the capacity was reduced to 4,134. Grade A status required a minimum capacity of 4,000, including at least 500 seats, with expansion to 5,000 spectators and 1,000 seats required by the end of a club's first season in Football League Two.

The record attendance at Priory Lane is 3,770 against Oxford United in the FA Cup first round on 5 November 2005.

The first live televised match at the stadium took place on 12 October 2008, when Borough hosted Stevenage Borough in a league fixture.

In March 2016, plans were finalised to install a 3G artificial turf pitch in time for the 2016–17 season.

In April 2017, Borough reached a ground-sharing agreement with neighbours Langney Wanderers, who played their home matches at Priory Lane from the 2017–18 season.

In August 2022, Borough reached an agreement with SO Legal Ltd to rename the stadium The SO Legal Stadium at Priory Lane. The agreement initially ran until the end of the 2022–23 season. SO Legal is a law firm based in Eastbourne, with offices in Eastbourne, Brighton, Hastings, Uckfield, London and Ulverston.

== Stands ==
- Main Stand – has a seating area for 600 spectators. It includes the Directors' Suite, Main Sponsor's Executive Suite, announcer's box, and press area. There is also a family area and disabled access to this stand.
- Mick Green Stand – houses the dressing rooms and a tea bar with indoor seating, while also providing covered terracing at the Priory Road end of the ground. The upper floor contains four executive suites in addition to the exclusive Legends Lounge, which overlooks the pitch.
- Peter Fountain Stand – a covered terrace that also contains a tea bar. This stand is traditionally occupied by the home supporters.
- River End Stand – a covered terrace with no additional amenities. Away supporters are usually accommodated here on segregated matchdays.

The stadium has parking facilities for approximately 400 vehicles, mainly located behind the River End Stand, with a smaller car park situated in front of the clubhouse.

== Segregation ==
Borough did not segregate league matches prior to their promotion to the Football Conference. However, during the 2008–09 season, following a home match against Mansfield Town, segregation was introduced for selected fixtures against larger clubs, with away supporters allocated the River End Stand.

== Other uses ==
In 2006, the stadium was selected by The Football Association to host all three of England's fixtures in the Non-League Home Nations Tournament.

The stadium also hosted the final of the Sussex Senior Challenge Cup between 2000 and 2010.

== Future developments ==
Eastbourne Borough released plans to expand Priory Lane in December 2011. The main focus of the proposed redevelopment was the Peter Fountain (North) Stand, which was planned to include executive boxes, new changing rooms and a players' tunnel. The River End (East) Stand was also scheduled to receive 16 tiers of terracing to improve the atmosphere, while the Main (South) Stand was intended to be extended to provide additional seating. Youth-team changing rooms were also proposed behind the stand, facing a new pitch for the club's youth teams.

== Transport ==
The ground is located over a mile away from Pevensey & Westham railway station, which lies on the East Coastway line between Hastings and Eastbourne. Eastbourne railway station is around six miles away and has good transport links. Both stations are served by Southern services.

There are approximately 400 parking spaces at the stadium, while the residential streets near the ground have limited parking availability. A bus service also operates from Eastbourne town centre to the stadium area.

== Attendances ==
The progression of Eastbourne Borough's attendance record at Priory Lane is as follows:

Updated 5 May 2025.

Date	Competition	Opposition	Attendance	Ref.
6 May 2002	Sussex Senior Cup	Lewes	1,558	
11 January 2003	FA Trophy	Farnborough Town	1,576	
5 May 2003	Sussex Senior Cup	Crawley Town	1,705	
5 November 2005	FA Cup	Oxford United	3,770	

The five highest attendances at Priory Lane are:

Updated 5 May 2025.

Date	Competition	Opposition	Attendance	Ref.
5 November 2005	FA Cup	Oxford United	3,770	
20 April 2025	National League South	Worthing	3,662	
4 May 2025	National League South play-off semi-final	Maidstone United	3,194	
11 August 2009	Conference National	AFC Wimbledon	3,108	
1 January 2008	Conference South	Lewes	3,027	
