= Eastbourne Borough F.C. =

Association football club in Eastbourne, England

- Full name: Eastbourne Borough Football Club
- Nickname: The Sports
- Founded: 1965; 61 years ago (as Langney Sports FC)
- Ground: Priory Lane
- Capacity: 3,622 (600 seated)
- Chairman: Simon Leslie
- Manager: Steve King
- League: Isthmian League Premier Division
- 2025–26: National League South, 24th of 24 (relegated)
- Website: ebfc.co.uk
Home colours	Away colours	Third colours

Eastbourne Borough Football Club is an association football club based in Eastbourne, East Sussex, England. The team competes in the Isthmian League Premier, the seventh level of the English football league system.

The club joined the Sussex County League in 1983 as a founding member of the new Division Three. Following two successive promotions in 1986–87 and 1987–88 under their then manager Pete Cherry, they played in Division One until the end of the 20th century. The club then experienced a rise through the divisions under Garry Wilson, gaining promotion to the Conference Premier in 2007–08.

They are known as The Sports after their previous name as Langney Sports.

Eastbourne Borough play their home matches at Priory Lane in Langney, Eastbourne. The club is an FA Chartered Standard Community club affiliated to the Sussex County Football Association and is a registered Community Interest Company.

== History ==
=== Early years ===
They were formed in 1964 as Langney F.C., naming themselves after the Langney district of Eastbourne in which the club continues to play its home games. It all started when a group of friends had played for the Langney and Friday Street youth team were too old to carry on playing and decided to form their own team so they could continue to play football. On forming in 1964, Langney FC entered the Eastbourne & District Football League, competing in Division 2. Despite forming in 1964, Langney only affiliated with the Sussex FA in the Summer 1965, which marks its first official season. Prior to the 1968/69 season there was a change of name to Langney Sports F.C. when the club affiliated to the Langney Community Association. At this time the club was playing on local recreation grounds before moving to Princes Park near the seafront, next door to Eastbourne United's ground at The Oval. At the end of the season 1973/74, the club won promotion to the Premier Division of the Eastbourne & Hastings League.

=== Sussex County League years: 1983–1999 ===
In 1983 the club was elected as a founding member of Division 3 of the Sussex County League, minutely overshadowed by FA officials stating that the club was a "parks team" and not taking the club seriously. They relocated from the playing fields at Princes Park to their current home ground at The SO Legal Stadium at Priory Lane, in the heart of the residential area of Langney.

In 1986/87 Langney Sports achieved a treble by claiming the Third Division title, the Division 3 League Cup and the Eastbourne Challenge Cup. The Sports followed this with a second successive promotion the next season to Division 1. In 1992, Langney reached the final of the Sussex Senior Challenge Cup, losing 0–1 to the reserve team of Sussex's only professional club, Brighton & Hove Albion. Langney regularly finished in the top four in Division One; the manager, Pete Cherry, left the club on mutual grounds having brought Langney Sports up from the Eastbourne and Hastings league into the county league; for two years Steve Richardson took the reins followed by Garry Wilson in 1999. In his first full season in 2000 they finished the season as Sussex County League Champions, and were promoted to the Eastern Division of the Southern League.

=== Climb to the Conference under Garry Wilson: 1999–2012 ===
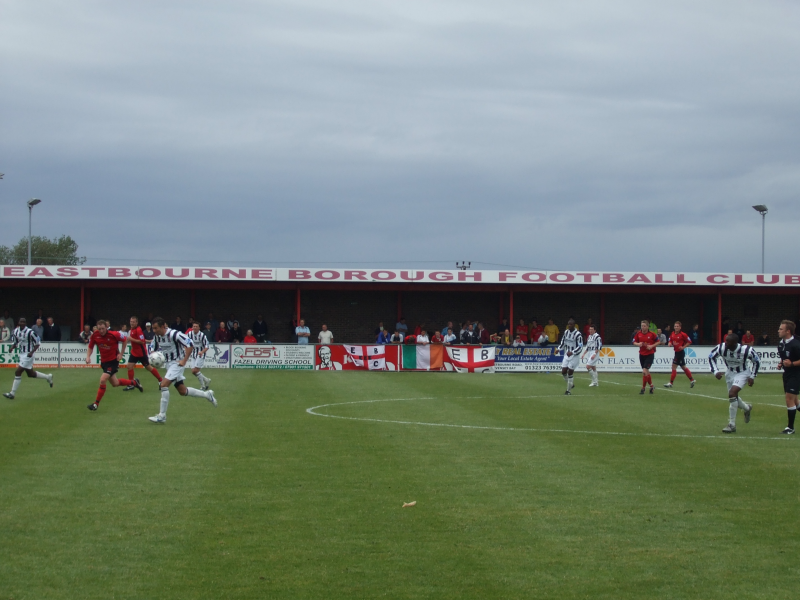
Eastbourne Borough at home to Maidenhead United on 18 August 2007

After their first season in the Southern Football League Eastern Division, in which they finished 9th in the table, the club chairman, Len Smith, announced on 26 May 2001 that the club was to be renamed Eastbourne Borough to reflect the town the team played in. In their second season they finished seventh and secured their first Sussex Senior Cup title in front of a record crowd, beating Lewes after extra-time in the final. The following season resulted in promotion to the Premier Division with Borough finishing second, losing out on the title on goal difference to Dorchester Town. At the end of the season they staged a defence of their Sussex Senior Cup title against Crawley Town in the final of the competition, losing 6–5 on penalties. Though they only finished 11th in their first season in the Premier Division, as the league system was changed the club were qualified to be one of the founders of the newly formed Conference South for the start of the 2004–05 season. A further promotion was almost earned immediately as the club finished fifth, and won the Conference South play-offs, beating Cambridge City 3–0. However, they were beaten 2–1 by Altrincham (who had won the Conference North play-offs) in the play-off final at Stoke City's Britannia Stadium, and remained in the Conference South.

The next season they finished in the bottom half of the table in 17th place and in the 2006–07 season they just missed out in the play-offs finishing in 7th place. The 2007–08 season was one of Eastbourne Borough's most memorable. From the start of the season until 1 January 2008 they were unbeaten at the top of the league, until losing to local rivals Lewes in front of 3,027 fans at Priory Lane. At the end of the season Eastbourne finished 2nd with 80 points while Lewes won with 89 points.

Eastbourne beat Braintree Town 5–0 over two legs in the play-off semi-finals, before winning promotion to the Conference National on 8 May 2008 with a 2–0 win over Hampton & Richmond Borough in the Conference South Play-off final at Broadhall Way, Stevenage.

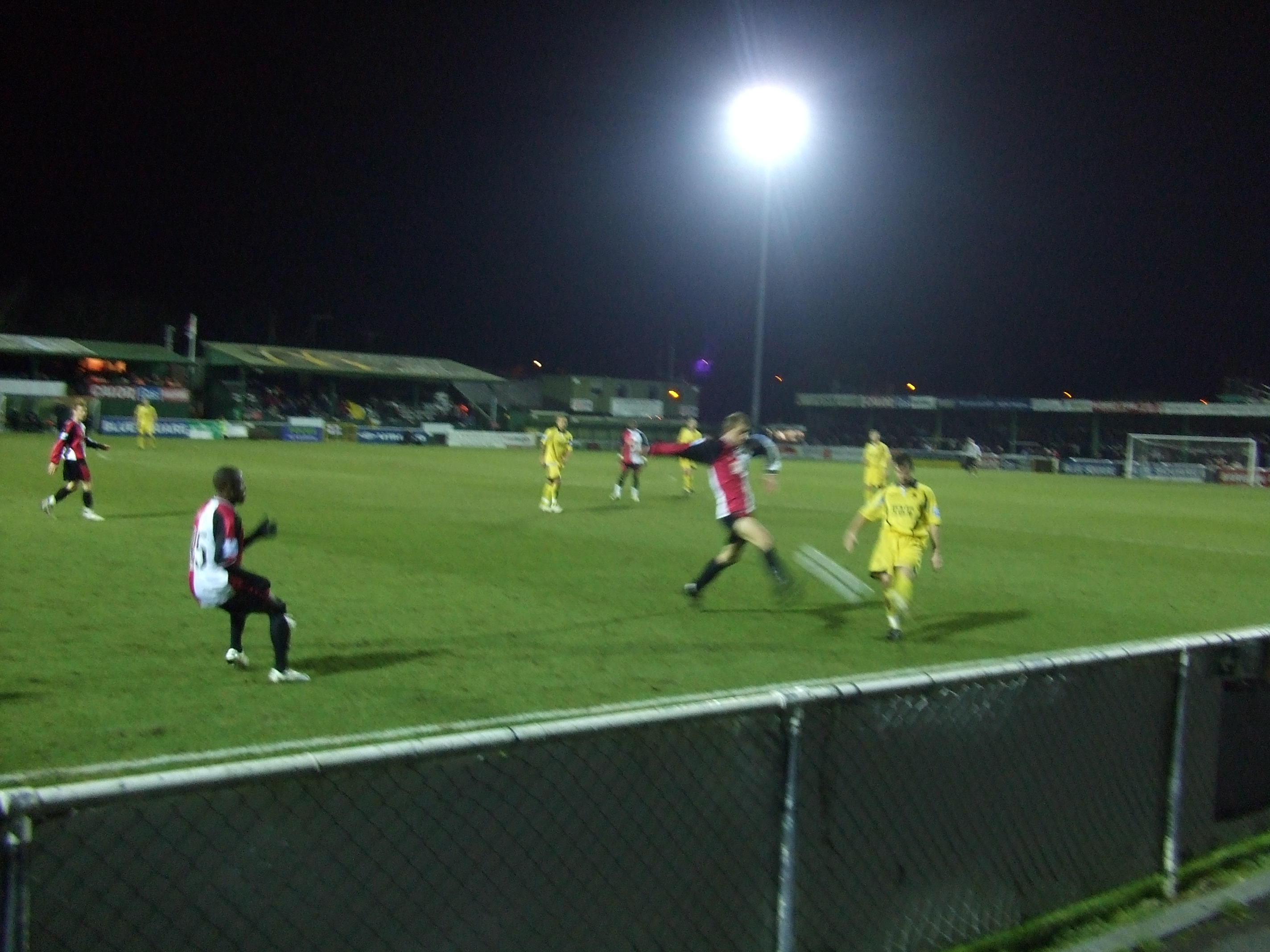
Eastbourne Borough away to Woking on 27 January 2009

At the start of their 2008–09 campaign in the Conference they were struggling outside the relegation zone, however after a few loan players were brought in, including Dan Smith and Ashley Barnes from Plymouth Argyle, and the signing of Dan Brown from Cambridge United, Eastbourne managed to stay in the top half of the table after some surprising wins over full-time clubs such as Torquay United and York City, until the last day of the season, losing 0–2 to Barrow. They finished their first season in a comfortable 13th place with 60 points and a goal difference of −12. The season saw Eastbourne play 'live' for the first time at Priory Lane in front of national TV cameras, which broadcast their match against Stevenage Borough, a match they won 2–1. Eastbourne also completed the 2008–09 season by winning the Sussex Senior Cup beating Brighton & Hove Albion Reserves 1–0.

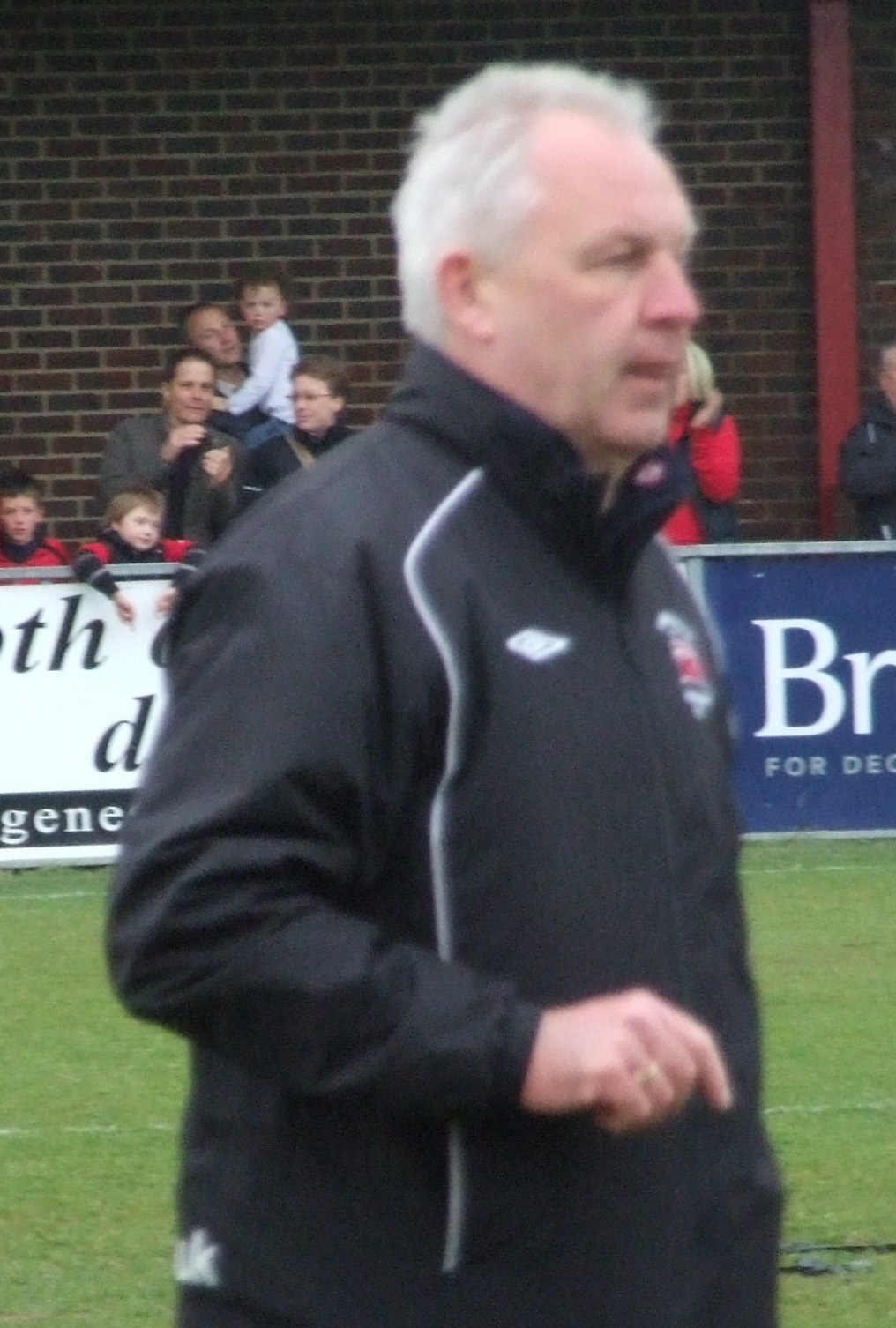
Garry Wilson

The 2009–10 season saw Eastbourne struggle from 'second season syndrome'. After a bright start, beating AFC Wimbledon and eventual FA Trophy winners Barrow at Priory Lane, Eastbourne experienced a slump in form and found themselves in a relegation battle. However a strong run of form towards the tail of the season saw them stay up in dramatic fashion beating eventual Play-Off winners Oxford United 1–0 on the final day of the season, with a late penalty scored by Simon Weatherstone in the 84th minute.

Eastbourne were relegated back to the Conference South in 2010–11. Having beaten both Hayes and Yeading and Altrincham 5–0 at home early in the season, they found themselves as top scorers in the Conference National at one point. However, following a series of setbacks involving injuries to key players, they endured a run of 20 games without a win. The winless streak was put to an end with a 1–0 away win at Fleetwood Town courtesy of an audacious free-kick from the half-way line by Matt Smart. Despite regaining some form late in the season, Eastbourne were unable to recover and ended on 39 points, 8 points short of safety. Ironically, Eastbourne beat Altrincham on the final day of the season to sentence them to the drop.

The end of the 2010/11 season was marked with the first competitive game ever to be played at Brighton and Hove Albion's new Falmer Stadium, contested between Eastbourne and Brighton & Hove Albion Reserves in the Sussex Senior Cup Final. Eastbourne lost the game 2–0 with Gary Hart scoring the first goal at the new stadium.

Halfway through the 2011–12 Conference South season, after a poor run of results, Eastbourne parted company with Garry Wilson and Head Coach Nick Greenwood. Both had been at the helm for 13 years and had taken the club from relative obscurity to the pinnacle of non-league football. Long-serving player Ben Austin was given a temporary player-manager role while the club looked a suitable replacement.

Eastbourne appointed Tommy Widdrington as their new manager on 1 February 2012. With the team lying 18th in the Conference South, chairman Len Smith outlined the aim to avoid relegation and rebuild for the 2012–13 season

The Sports secured their safety on the 41st and penultimate matchday, despite losing to a 3–0 scoreline away at Basingstoke Town. Results elsewhere meant their Conference South status was retained for the 2012–13 season. They finished the season in 18th place.

=== Mixed fortunes: 2012–2023 ===
Widdrington's arrival signaled a move towards a new look Eastbourne team, with the last few members of the 2007–08 promotion winning team leaving the club at the end of the season. Matt Crabb, Matt Smart and Ben Austin departed, leaving Darren Baker as the sole survivor of the team that won promotion at Stevenage in 2008.

The 2012–13 season was Widdrington's first full-season in charge and was a season of transition. In total 41 players pulled on a Borough shirt as the new manager tried to find the right mixture. Borough ended the season as the team having scored the fewest goals, but having one of the tightest defensive records, which contributed to their finishing the season in 12th place.

In the spring of 2013, Eastbourne were in talks with Kuwaiti European Holdings (KEH) over a potential take over of the club. Despite negotiations collapsing at the latter stages, Borough pressed on with their plans to develop the club, establishing an academy which would act as a feeder to the first team. Following an 18-month rebuilding process, Borough had a strong start to the 2013–14 season accumulating 10 points from 4 matches, which earned Tommy Widdrington the August Manager of the Month award. Their early season form, however, faded and they experienced a dip in mid-season which saw them fall away from the top. Despite regaining some momentum after Christmas they were unable to recover and finished the season in 10th place on 58 points.

During the early stages of the 2014–15 season, Len Smith, who had served as chairman of the club for more than 40 years, stood down from his position with Eastbourne sitting at the top of the fledgling Conference South table after 6 games. Halfway through the season, upon the news that the Football Conference would be allowing artificial pitches from the 2015–16 season, Eastbourne announced that they would convert to a 3G pitch by the 2015–16 or 2016–17 season At this point in time, the Football League still refused allowing 3G pitches and Eastbourne was among the first Conference-level clubs to announce plans to switch to the surface. Eastbourne finished the 2014–15 season in 11th place.

2015–16 was Eastbourne's 50th anniversary season. Although they could only secure a 17th-place finish in the league, they won the Sussex Senior Cup for the third time in their history at the end of the season.

Widdrington resigned from his post in April 2017 to pursue an opportunity at Coventry City, leaving head coach Hugo Langton in charge for the last 5 games of the season.

At the end of the 2016–17 season, Eastbourne appointed Bognor Regis Town manager Jamie Howell to take over the vacant managerial position, who had two days previously lead Bognor back to the National League South.

In Howell's first full season at the club, Eastbourne registered an 18th-place finish. The following season, Eastbourne started positively and found themselves in the play-off spots with 4 wins, 4 draws and just one defeat after their opening 9 games. However, their form dropped and Howell was sacked by the club on 16 February 2019 with Eastbourne in 15th place in the table.

Eastbourne appointed Mark McGhee to act as interim manager until the end season. Despite winning just once in their remaining 11 games – this coming as a shock 6–0 victory against play-off chasing Dartford – Borough managed to retain their National South status for another year.

The start of the 2019–20 season saw Lee Bradbury take charge for a very brief period until October 2019. In November 2019 Danny Bloor was announced as the new manager. In a season curtailed by the COVID-19 pandemic, Borough finished 18th. The following season saw Borough flying high in the 3rd place, before the competition was prematurely cancelled for the same reason.

The 2021–22 season was Danny Bloor's first full season in charge, despite having been manager for almost two years. Borough continued in the same vein as the previous season, finishing the season in 6th position. They entered the play-off eliminator round but lost to Oxford City 2–0. Eastbourne followed this with an 8th-place finish for the 2022–23 season, narrowly missing out on the play-off spots.

=== Under new ownership: 2023–present ===
On 2 June 2023, the club underwent a takeover, being bought by the former owner of travel media company Ink, Simon Leslie. Following the takeover Danny Bloor left his position as manager. A few days later Mark Beard was appointed as the new manager.

Following a poor run of results leading to Eastbourne sitting in 21st, six points into the relegation zone, Mark Beard was sacked on the 1 January 2024. Adam Murray was appointed as new manager a few days later. Eastbourne managed to turn their fortunes around, losing just once in their final 12 games. They secured safety on the penultimate game day of the season and finished in 19th place on 52 points.

During the 2024/25 season, under Adam Murray, Eastbourne performed much better, with lengthy time in playoff positions. They managed to achieve the previous season's goal record (53) with 8 games still to play. On the 18 April 2025, Eastbourne broke their record for league home attendance, with 3622 spectators during a 1-1 draw against Worthing. They finished 3rd at the end of the season, narrowly missing 1st place by 1 point.

At the start of the 2025/26 season, Adam Murray left Eastbourne for Kidderminster Harriers, stating familial matters. Matt Gray replaced him, who himself was sacked after failing to win any of his first 10 games. On the 16th of October, he was replaced by former manager Tommy Widdrington. Widdrington was sacked on the 18th February after a poor set of results which included one win in his last eight. On the 9th of March, Steve King was appointed manager. Eastbourne were relegated following a 1-1 draw with Tonbridge Angels on the 6th April. It is the second time Eastbourne have been relegated in their history, and their lowest position in the football pyramid since 2004.

=== FA Cup history ===
During the 2005/06 season, the club reached the first round of the FA Cup for the first time in the club's history, when a battling performance saw them hold League Two club Oxford United to a 1–1 draw at home, winger Ollie Rowland, holding his nerve to score a 90th-minute penalty.

This match gained the club three milestones. These were:

- 1. The first time that Eastbourne Borough had played a competitive match against a fully professional league-side.
- 2. The first time that Eastbourne Borough were given national television coverage (highlights of the match at the Priory Lane ground were shown on BBC's Match of the Day)
- 3. For the first time ever the home and away supporters had to be segregated due to the attendance of 3,770.

The East-Sussex side failed to win the replay at Oxford's Kassam Stadium on a cold mid-week November night. losing 3–0, the Eastbourne squad put up a very good fight and were extremely unlucky not to score. Ex-Yeovil Town striker Yemi Odubade played particularly well and caused many problems for the defence, so much so that manager Brian Talbot admitted he was very interested in having the talented youngster play for his side and asked the Eastbourne Borough committee if he could take Yemi Odubade on a trial at Oxford United. In January 2006, Oxford paid Sports £15,000 to sign Odubade on an 18-month contract, rising to £25,000 with appearances.

Again the club reached the FA Cup first round in the 2007/08 season and played Conference National side Weymouth. Borough lost 4 – 0 in front of a crowd of 2,711 supporters. They also lost to the same scoreline in the 2008/09 season away to Barrow in the 1st round replay.

The club reached the FA Cup first round again in the 2016/17 season and played Conference National side Braintree Town. Eastbourne crashed out of the competition by losing 7–0 to the Essex club.

2020 saw the Sports grace BT Sports for a live FA Cup 1st round match versus Blackpool of League One. Due to the COVID-19 pandemic it was game played without fans. The Borough lost 3–0.

== Crest and colours ==
Eastbourne's club crest was updated in the summer of 2023 following the takeover of the club by Simon Leslie. It is a modern take on the traditional club badge, which dated from the 1970s, and the current version is its third incarnation. It represents a Martello tower, specifically the one at nearby Langney Point, with a cloud passing across it. The club had sought a crest identifiable with the local area, and the initial choice was between two local landmarks: Langney Priory and the Martello tower.

The club's colours have changed over time; originally they were maroon with an amber trim. Since 1972 the club colour has been red. Red has been combined with other colours over the years, including white and red, however in recent years the predominant combination has been red and black.

The club have traditionally used various shades of blue for their away strip, but in recent years yellow has been used.

Borough's main shirt sponsors have included 1st Class Windows, Town Flats & Town Property, Hailsham Roadway, Best Demolition and Interlink Express.

The Sports were sponsored by Norwegian Cruise Line for the 2023–24 season.

== Ground ==
Since 1983, Eastbourne Borough have played their home games at Priory Lane, Langney, which has an official capacity of 3,622. Prior to this, they played on the playing fields at Princes Park.

Many of the facilities on the Priory Lane site, including the clubhouse, were built largely by a handful of volunteers. Just two professionals, a carpet fitter and a plumber, were deployed for the construction of the clubhouse.

In 2006, Priory Lane hosted all three England fixtures of the Non-League Four Nations Tournament.

The ground also hosted the Sussex Senior Cup final from 2000 to 2010.

Eastbourne faced the possibility of losing Priory Lane in 2007 due to a rent dispute with the local council. A petition was started to prevent this from occurring.

Between 1983 and 2016, the playing surface at Priory Lane was natural grass. In summer 2016, Eastbourne installed a FieldTurf surface.

In August 2022, Eastbourne Borough FC signed a stadium naming rights deal with SO Legal Ltd, and the ground was renamed The SO Legal Stadium at Priory Lane. Since October 2025, the stadium has been known as the Connect Management Stadium due to a new sponsorship agreement.

== Supporters ==
Eastbourne's attendances rose rapidly during the club's rise through the divisions. While in the 2001–02 Southern Football League season they attracted an average crowd of 382, attendance figures peaked during the 2008–09 Football Conference season at an average of 1,344.

Eastbourne Borough have a supporters' club which liaises with the club on behalf of supporters, and arranges matchday travel and social events.

=== Rivalries ===
Eastbourne Borough have shared rivalries with Hastings United, Lewes, Tonbridge Angels, Whitehawk, Worthing and Folkestone Invicta in recent years, developed while competing in the same divisions.

The rivalry with Lewes drew large crowds during the 2007–08 Football Conference title race.

They have a lesser rivalry with local clubs Eastbourne Town and Eastbourne United, due to not having shared the same league for a considerable period. Eastbourne Borough previously shared a rivalry with Crawley Town, although this has faded over time.

=== Mascot ===
Eastbourne's official mascot is Sammy Sunshine.

== Organisation and community involvement ==
Eastbourne Borough has been a FA Chartered Standard Community club since 2002. The club became a Community Interest Company (CIC) in July 2008. It was the first senior football club in the country to achieve CIC status.

A CIC operates as a limited company but must meet specific criteria that benefit the community, including an asset lock. Eastbourne Borough is a CIC limited by shares.

Alongside football coaching for all ages, the club provides a variety of community services, including study support, indoor bowls, archery, and social events.

== Players ==
=== Current squad ===
Updated 9 October 2026.

Note: Flags indicate national team as defined under FIFA eligibility rules; some limited exceptions apply. Players may hold more than one non-FIFA nationality.

No.	Pos.	Nation	Player
1	GK	ENG	Lewis Carey
2	DF	ENG	Matthew Hayden
3	DF	ENG	Elliott Johnson (captain)
4	MF	ENG	Josh Rees
5	DF	USA	Giles Phillips
6	DF	ENG	Harry Phipps (vice-captain)
7	MF	ENG	Kai Corbett
8	MF	ENG	Max Sheaf
9	FW	SUI	Gold Omotayo
10	FW	ENG	Liam Nash
11	FW	ENG	Darren McQueen
12	DF	IRL	Sam Oguntayo

No.	Pos.	Nation	Player
13	GK	ENG	Alex Hobden
14	FW	ENG	Zack Tarrant
15	MF	ENG	Craig Eastmond
16	DF	ENG	Freddie Carter
17	FW	ENG	Terrell Egbri
18	FW	ENG	Tyano Wilson
20	MF	ENG	Arthur Grout
22	MF	ENG	Owen Bellemy
23	FW	ENG	Shayon Harrison
24	MF	ENG	Nathan Laleye
26	FW	ENG	Paul McCallum
30	GK	AUS	Jack West-Astuti

=== Out on loan ===
Note: Flags indicate national team as defined under FIFA eligibility rules; some limited exceptions apply. Players may hold more than one non-FIFA nationality.

No.	Pos.	Nation	Player

== Coaching staff ==
Staff
(England) Steve King	Manager
(England) Ryan Northmore	Assistant Manager
(Sri Lanka) Marvin Hamilton	First-team Coach
(England) Jerome John	Goalkeeping Coach
(England) Elliott Middleton	Analyst
(England) Jeremiah Adegoke	Physiotherapist
(England) Jack Knowles	Strength and Conditioning Coach

== Other teams ==
Eastbourne Borough have other teams which include:

- Eastbourne Borough Academy, currently playing in the Football Conference Youth Alliance
- Eastbourne Borough Ladies, formed in 2004 and currently play in the South East Combination Premier
- Eastbourne Borough Youth.
- Eastbourne Borough Under-18s

== Management history ==
Below is a list of Langney Sports (1983–2001) and Eastbourne Borough (2001–Present) managers since 1983.

Stats as of 21 November 2026. League matches only.

Dates	Name	Achievements	Games	Won	Lost	Drawn	%	Notes
From: 1983; To: 1997	(England) Peter Cherry	Sussex County League; Division 3 Champions: 1986/87; Division 2 Champions: 1987/88	456	242	111	103	53.07
From: 1997; To: January 1999	(England) Steve Richardson		58	35	16	7	60.34
From: January 1999; To: 8 February 1999	(England) Nick Greenwood (Caretaker Manager)		1	0	0	1	0.00
From: 9 February 1999; To: 17 January 2012	(Scotland) Garry Wilson	Sussex County League; Division 1 Champions: 1999/00; Southern League; Eastern runners-up: 2002/03; Conference South; Promotion: 2007/08	553	237	187	129	42.86
From: 17 January 2012; To: 1 February 2012	(England) Ben Austin (Caretaker Player-Manager)		2	0	2	0	0.00
From: 1 February 2012; To: 7 April 2017	(England) Tommy Widdrington		219	76	87	56	34.70
From: 7 April 2017; To: 3 May 2017	(England) Hugo Langton (Caretaker Manager)		5	2	3	0	40.00
From: 3 May 2017; To: 16 February 2019	(England) Jamie Howell		73	22	36	15	30.14
From: 19 February 2019; To: 7 May 2019	(Scotland) Mark McGhee (Caretaker Manager)		11	1	6	4	9.09
From: 7 May 2019; To: 22 October 2019	(England) Lee Bradbury		13	3	5	5	23.08
From: 22 October 2019; To: 3 November 2019	(Argentina) Sergio Torres (Caretaker Player-Manager)		3	0	1	2	0.00
From: 3 November 2019; To: 5 June 2023	(England) Danny Bloor		122	53	42	27	43.44
From: 8 June 2023; To: 1 January 2024	(England) Mark Beard		26	6	15	5	23.08
From: 3 January 2024; To: 4 January 2024	(England) Bradley Barry (Caretaker Player-Manager)		0	0	0	0	–
From: 4 January 2024; To: 16 May 2025	(England) Adam Murray		66	33	15	18	50.00
From: 23 May 2025; To: 7 October 2025	(England) Matt Gray		10	0	5	5	0.00
From: 7 October 2025; To: 16 October 2025	(England) Chris Day (Caretaker Manager)		0	0	0	0	–
From: 16 October 2025; To: 18 February 2026	(England) Tommy Widdrington		23	6	15	2	26.09
From: 19 February 2026; To: 9 March 2026	(England) Robbie Blake (Caretaker Manager)		4	2	2	0	50.00
From: 9 March 2026; To: present	(England) Steve King		26	12	10	4	46.15

== Records ==
=== Player records ===
- Most appearances:
  - Darren Baker, 952 (1992–2013)
- Most goals scored:
  - Scott Ramsay, 135 (2002–2008)
- Most goals in a season:
  - Scott Ramsay, 38 (2002–03)
- Most league goals in a season:
  - Scott Ramsay, 30 (2002–03)
- First player to earn a full international cap while at the club:
  - James Walker, for Antigua and Barbuda, September 2012.

^{*}Player records list only players who played for the club post-County League (2000–), as the data until this point is insufficient.

=== Club records ===
- Highest transfer received:
  - £25,000 for Yemi Odubade, Oxford United, 2006
- Attendance:
  - 3,770 v Oxford United, FA Cup 1st Round, 5 November 2005
- League attendance:
  - 3,622 v Worthing, 18 April 2025
- Biggest win:
  - 11–1 v Crowborough, Sussex Senior Cup Quarter-final, 13 January 2009.
- Biggest defeat:
  - 0–8 v Sheppey United, FA Vase Preliminary Round, 2 October 1993.

Best performances

- Highest League Table Position
  - Conference National: 13th, 2008–09
- FA Cup
  - First round: 2005–06, 2007–08, 2008–09, 2016–17, 2020–21
- FA Trophy
  - Third round: 2001–02, 2002–03, 2004–05, 2010–11, 2021–22, 2022–23, 2024–25, 2026–27
- FA Vase
  - Second round: 1990–91, 1991–92, 1997–98
- Conference League Cup
  - Fourth round: 2007–08

== Honours ==
Achievements before 2001 were under the Langney Sports F.C. name; after 2001, under the Eastbourne Borough F.C. name.

League

- Conference South (level 6)
  - Play-off winners: 2005, 2008
- Southern League Eastern (level 7)
  - Runners-up: 2002–03
- Eastbourne & Hastings League Premier
  - Champions: 1981–82
- Sussex County League
  - Division One champions: 1999–2000
  - Division Two champions: 1987–88
  - Division Three champions: 1986–87

Cup

- Sussex Division Three League Cup
  - Winners: 1986–87
- Sussex County League Cup
  - Winners: 1989–90
- Sussex Floodlight Cup
  - Runners-up: 1997–98
- Sussex Senior Challenge Cup
  - Winners: 2001–02, 2008–09, 2015–16
- Roy Hayden Memorial Trophy / Sussex Community Shield
  - Winners: 2002, 2009, 2016

== Awards ==
- Non-League Directory's Club of the Year Home Counties South: 2000
- Sussex County FA Community Club of the Year: 2004, 2005, 2006, 2007, 2008, 2009
- FA Community Club of the Year South East Regional: 2006, 2008
