= Sussex Senior Cup =

- Organiser(s): Sussex County Football Association
- Founded: 1882; 144 years ago
- Region: Sussex
- Teams: 50 (2016–17 season)
- Current champions: Three Bridges (1st title)
- Most championships: Worthing (22 titles)

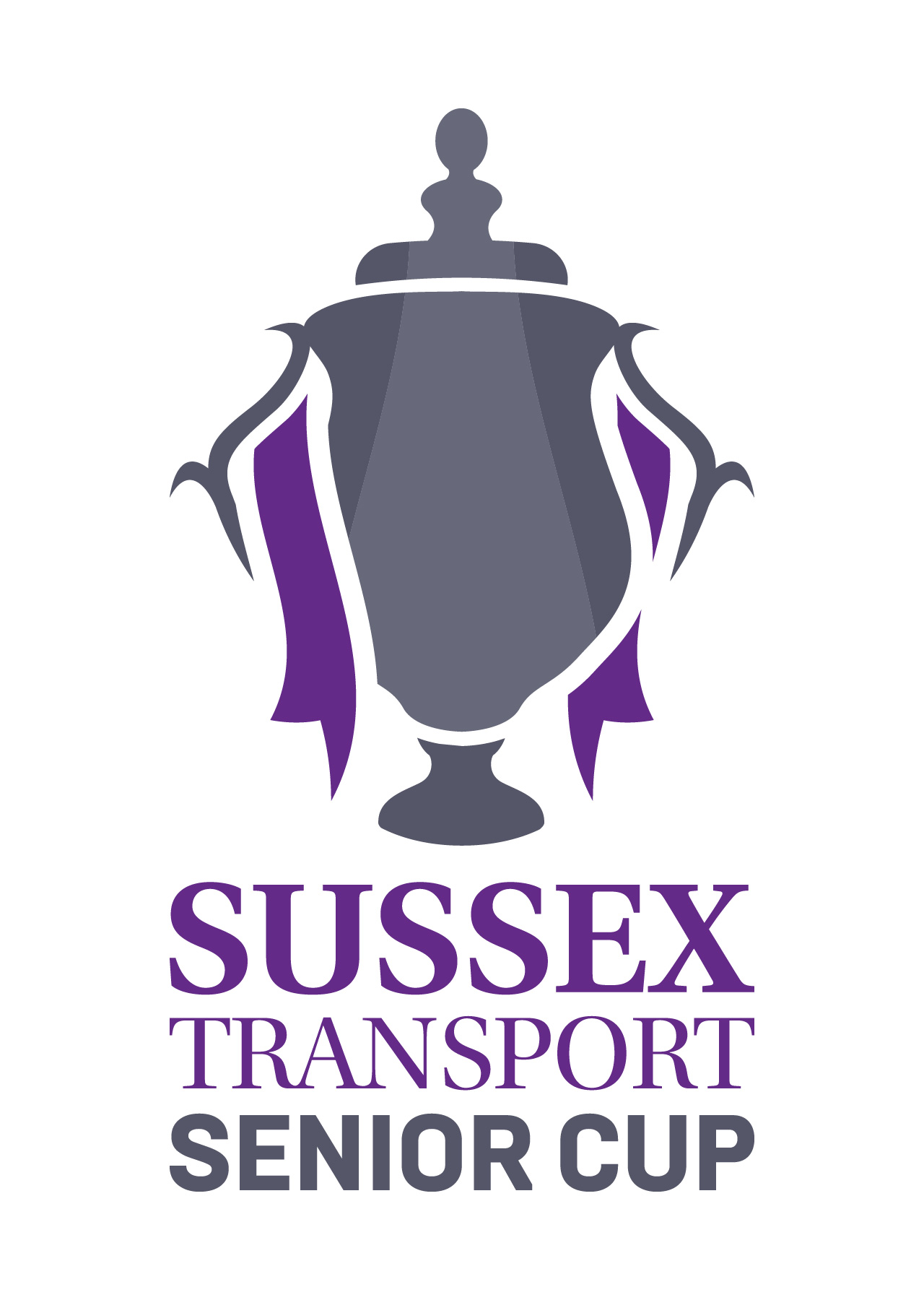
The logo for the Sussex Transport Senior Challenge Cup

The Sussex Senior Challenge Cup, more commonly known as the Sussex Senior Cup, is an annual association football knockout cup competition for men's football clubs in the English county of Sussex. The cup is the county senior cup of the Sussex FA and is both the longest-running and most prestigious cup competition in Sussex football. For sponsorship purposes the trophy is also known as the Sussex Transport Senior Challenge Cup, after a new sponsorship deal was agreed in 2023.

First played for in the 1882–83 season, shortly after the founding of the Sussex County Football Association in September 1882, the first club to hold the cup was Brighton Rangers. Other winning teams in the cup's early history were Burgess Hill, Lancing College and Eastbourne. The cup is played by men's football teams in Sussex; a concurrent Sussex Women's Cup has been held for women's teams in Sussex since 1995.

The team with most title wins in the competition's history is Worthing, but Sussex's sole Premier League team, Brighton & Hove Albion, has been the most successful in recent years. Bognor Regis Town won the competition a record five times in succession between 1980 and 1984.

The winning club also qualifies to play in the Sussex FA Community Shield match, traditionally the opening match each season in Sussex football. Three Bridges are the current holders of the Sussex Senior Cup, having won the cup for the first time by beating Brighton & Hove Albion on penalties in the 2026 final.

== History ==
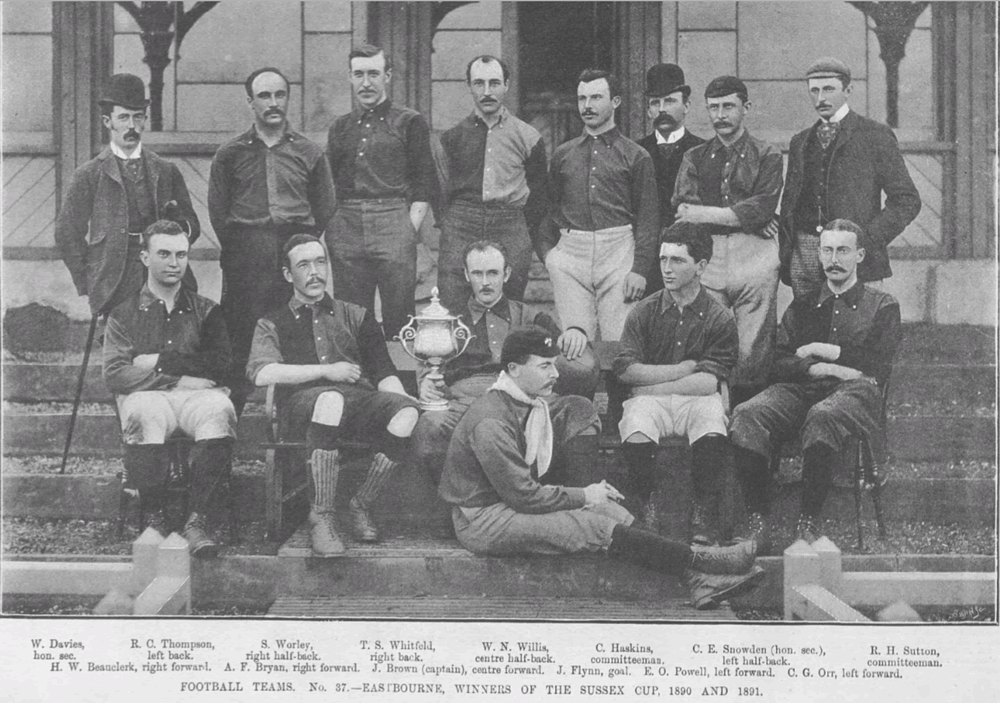
Eastbourne Town players in February 1892, pictured with the Sussex Senior Cup that they won in 1889−90 and 1890−91

Shortly after the Sussex County Football Association was founded in 1882 the inaugural competition of the Sussex Senior Club took place for the 1882–83 season. Brighton Rangers won the final of the first competition 3–0. Founder members of Sussex County FA include the public schools of Lancing College, Brighton College and Ardingly College and their old-boy teams dominated the cup early on, along with clubs such as Burgess Hill and Eastbourne, whose teams were made up of upper and middle class players.

The cup was initially contested only by amateur clubs. At the time Sussex's only professional club, Brighton & Hove Albion tried to enter the competition in 1905 but had to withdraw because of clashing dates. Albion won the Sussex Wartime Cup in 1943 but only entered the normal competition in 1946. Albion entered the competition again in 1975-76 following the abolition of the distinction between amateur and professional clubs in the English game.

Following the 1913–14 competition, the cup was suspended due to the First World War, and resumed in 1919–20. During the Second World War the winners of the Sussex Wartime Cup were awarded the Sussex Senior Cup. The Sussex Wartime Cup took place on a league basis and a competition was held in every year during the Second World War except for 1940-41 when no competition for the Sussex Senior Cup was held.

Under Jack Pearce, Bognor Regis Town dominated the Sussex Senior Cup in the 1980s, winning the cup six times, including a record five times in succession, and finishing runners-up once.

From 1950 to 1951 the cup final took place at the Goldstone Ground every year until 1995 when Brighton sold their ground to developers. A crowd of over 7,000, the cup's highest attendance in recent years, saw the 2010–11 season final take place at Brighton's new Falmer Stadium on 16 July 2011. It was the first competitive match to be played there. Brighton won the game 2–0 with Gary Hart scoring the first ever goal at the new ground. The cup final has taken place there every year since 2011.

== Eligibility ==
The Sussex Senior Cup is open to all men's senior clubs in the historic county of Sussex that are affiliated to the Sussex County Football Association. In 2016–17 this was 50 clubs that play in the top ten tiers of the English football league system (Premier League, English Football League, National League, National League South, Isthmian League, Southern Combination Football League Premier Division, Southern Combination Football League Division One and Southern Counties East Premier Division).

== Competition format ==
=== Overview ===
Beginning in September, the competition proceeds as a knockout tournament throughout its duration, consisting of three rounds, then quarter-finals, semi-finals and final, usually in May. A system of byes ensures that the highest placed 14 clubs in Sussex enter the competition in the second round. For reasons of fairness to other clubs, the Brighton & Hove Albion and Crawley Town under-21 teams compete in the Sussex Senior Cup since, as full time professional squads, their first teams play many levels of the football league pyramid ahead of other teams.

=== Distribution ===
The tournament is organised so that 32 clubs remain by the second round. 31 clubs in the Southern Combination League Premier Division and Division One (tiers 9 and 10 of the English football league system) and one club from the Wessex Premier Division (tier 9) enter in the first round.

In the first round, Bognor Regis Town, Brighton & Hove Albion, Burgess Hill Town, Chichester City, Crawley Town, East Grinstead Town, Eastbourne Borough, Hastings United, Haywards Heath Town, Horsham, Lancing, Lewes, Littlehampton Town, Three Bridges, Whitehawk and Worthing, all receive a bye to the second round.

- Professional clubs from the Premier League and the English Football League can only enter an Under-21 or an Under-23 team to keep fairness to non-professional clubs.

	Clubs entering in this round	Clubs advancing from previous round
First round (32 clubs)	13 clubs from Southern Combination Division One; 18 clubs from Southern Combination Premier Division; 1 club from Wessex Premier Division	
Second round (32 clubs)	8 clubs from Isthmian League South East Division; 4 clubs from Isthmian League Premier Division; 2 clubs from National League South; 1 club from Football League Two; 1 club from Premier League	16 winners from first round
Third round (16 clubs)		16 winners from second round
Fourth round (8 clubs)		8 winners from third round
Semi-finals (4 clubs)		4 winners from quarter-finals
Final (2 clubs)		2 winners from semi-finals

== Qualification for subsequent competitions ==
=== Sussex Community Shield ===
The winners of the Sussex Senior Cup traditionally play the winners of the Southern Combination Football League for the Sussex Community Shield (also known as the Sussex County FA Community Shield. The 2019 competition saw Chichester City, the winners of the 2018−19 SCFL play Bognor Regis Town, the winners of the 2018−19 Sussex Senior Cup. Bognor won the 2019 Sussex Community Shield 1−0 with a goal from Dan Smith.

== Winners and finalists ==
=== 1883-1900 ===
	Season	Winners	Runners-up	Final result	Venue	Attendance	Notes
1	1882-83	Brighton Rangers	Burgess Hill	3-0	Preston Park	N/A	
2	1883-84	Burgess Hill	Ardingly College	2-0	Preston Park	N/A	
3	1884-85	Burgess Hill	Lancing College	5-1	Preston Park	N/A	
4	1885-86	Burgess Hill	Lancing College	2-0	Preston Park	N/A	
5	1886-87	Lancing College	Brighton College	4-3	County Ground	N/A	
6	1887-88	Lancing College	Brighton College	2-1	County Ground	N/A	
7	1888-89	Brighton College	Burgess Hill	1-1, 1-0	County Ground	N/A	
8	1889-90	Eastbourne	Chichester	4-0	County Ground	N/A	
9	1890-91	Eastbourne	won on a league basis				
10	1891-92	Brighton Hornets	Worthing	5-3	County Ground	N/A	
11	1892-93	Worthing	Eastbourne	2-1	County Ground	N/A	
12	1893-94	Eastbourne	Southwick	2-1	County Ground	N/A	
13	1894-95	Eastbourne	Southwick	1-0	County Ground	N/A	
14	1895-96	Royal Irish Rifles	Southwick	4-0	County Ground	N/A	
15	1896-97	Southwick	Eastbourne	1-0	County Ground	7,000-8,000	2 replays (0-0, 3-3)
16	1897-98	Eastbourne Swifts	Hastings and St Leonards	3-0	County Ground	N/A	
17	1898-99	Eastbourne	Hastings and St Leonards	3-0	County Ground	N/A	
18	1899-1900	Eastbourne	Chichester	3-0	County Ground	N/A	

=== 1901-1945 ===
	Season	Winners	Runners-up	Final result	Venue	Attendance	Notes
19	1900-01	Eastbourne	Brighton and Hove Rangers	3-1	County Ground	N/A	
20	1901-02	Shoreham	Hailsham	3-0	County Ground	N/A	
21	1902-03	Eastbourne	Hastings and St Leonards	7-0	County Ground	N/A	
22	1903-04	Worthing	St Leonards	2-1	County Ground	N/A	
23	1904-05	Eastbourne Old Town	Shoreham	3-0	County Ground	N/A	
24	1905-06	Shoreham	Hove	2-1	Goldstone Ground	N/A	
25	1906-07	Hove	Eastbourne	4-0	Goldstone Ground	N/A	
26	1907-08	Worthing	Helmston	3-1	Goldstone Ground	N/A	
27	1908-09	Hove	Newhaven	2-2, 2-1	Goldstone Ground	N/A	
28	1909-10	Hove	Chichester	3-1	Goldstone Ground	N/A	
29	1910-11	Southwick	Lewes	1-0	Goldstone Ground	N/A	
30	1911-12	St Leonards Amateurs	East Grinstead	4-1	Goldstone Ground	N/A	
31	1912-13	Southwick	Lewes	3-2	Goldstone Ground	N/A	
32	1913-14	Worthing	Eastbourne St Mary's	4-0	Goldstone Ground	N/A	
33	1919-20	Worthing	Signalling School	2-1	The Dripping Pan	N/A	
34	1920-21	Royal Corps of Signals	Eastbourne	1-0	The Dripping Pan	N/A	
35	1921-22	Eastbourne	Worthing	2-1	The Dripping Pan	N/A	
36	1922-23	Worthing	Eastbourne	2-0	The Dripping Pan	N/A	
37	1923-24	Royal Corps of Signals	Southwick	2-0	The Dripping Pan	N/A	
38	1924-25	Southwick	Shoreham	2-1	The Dripping Pan	N/A	
39	1925-26	Chichester	Eastbourne	5-1	The Dripping Pan	N/A	
40	1926-27	Worthing	Chichester	3-1	The Dripping Pan	N/A	
41	1927-28	Southwick	Eastbourne	3-0	The Dripping Pan	N/A	
42	1928-29	Worthing	Southwick	2-0	The Dripping Pan	N/A	
43	1929-30	Southwick	Eastbourne Old Comrades	3-0	The Dripping Pan	N/A	
44	1930-31	Southwick	Lewes	3-0	Trafalgar Ground	N/A	
45	1931-32	Eastbourne	Lewes	3-2aet	Trafalgar Ground	N/A	
46	1932-33	Eastbourne	Hastings and St Leonards	3-1	The Dripping Pan	N/A	
47	1933-34	Horsham	Lewes	4-1	Woodside Road	N/A	
48	1934-35	Worthing	Hastings and St Leonards	2-1	The Dripping Pan	N/A	
49	1935-36	Hastings & St. Leonards	Lewes	2-0	The Saffrons	N/A	
50	1936-37	Southwick	Haywards Heath	8-3	The Dripping Pan	N/A	
51	1937-38	Hastings & St. Leonards	Haywards Heath	4-1	The Dripping Pan	N/A	
52	1938-39	Horsham	Worthing	3-1	Goldstone Ground	N/A	
53	1939-40	Worthing	Hastings & St. Leonards	1-1aet 4-1	The Dripping Pan; Goldstone Ground	N/A	
54	1941-42	Haywards Heath Town	won on a league basis				
55	1942-43	Brighton and Hove Albion F.C. Juniors	won on a league basis				
56	1943-44	RAF (Ford)	won on a league basis				
57	1944-45	Worthing	won on a league basis				

=== Post-1945 winners ===
	Season	Winners	Runners-up	Final result	Venue	Attendance	Notes
58	1945–46	Worthing	Hastings and St. Leonards	3–2 (on aggregate)	1st leg Hastings, 2nd leg Worthing	N/A	
59	1946–47	Worthing	Haywards Heath	1–0	The Dripping Pan	N/A	
60	1947–48	Southwick	Horsham	3-0	Goldstone Ground	N/A	
61	1948–49	Littlehampton Town	Southwick	3–2	Queen Street	N/A	
62	1949–50	Horsham	Skyways F.C.	2–1	Woodside Road	N/A	
63	1950–51	Whitehawk & Manor Farm Old Boys	Eastbourne	1–0	Woodside Road	N/A	
64	1951–52	Worthing	Bognor Regis Town	3–2	Goldstone Ground	N/A	
65	1952–53	Eastbourne	Newhaven	2–1	Goldstone Ground	N/A	
66	1953–54	Horsham	Whitehawk & Manor Farm Old Boys	1–0	Goldstone Ground	N/A	
67	1954–55	Bognor Regis Town	Horsham	2–1	Goldstone Ground	N/A	
68	1955–56	Bognor Regis Town	Eastbourne United	3–2	Goldstone Ground	N/A	
69	1956–57	Worthing	Eastbourne United	2–1	Goldstone Ground	N/A	
70	1957–58	Haywards Heath	Worthing	2–1	Goldstone Ground	N/A	
71	1958–59	Worthing	Crawley Town	2–1	Goldstone Ground	N/A	
72	1959–60	Eastbourne United	Bognor Regis Town	1–0	Goldstone Ground	N/A	
73	1960–61	Worthing	Horsham	4–3	Goldstone Ground	N/A	
74	1961–62	Whitehawk	Eastbourne United	4–0	Goldstone Ground	N/A	
75	1962–63	Eastbourne United	Selsey	1–0	Goldstone Ground	N/A	
76	1963–64	Eastbourne United	Lewes	2–0	Goldstone Ground	N/A	
77	1964–65	Lewes	Littlehampton Town	6–3	Goldstone Ground	N/A	
78	1965–66	Eastbourne United	Chichester City	5–1	Goldstone Ground	N/A	
79	1966–67	Eastbourne United	Horsham	2–0	Goldstone Ground	N/A	
80	1967–68	Southwick	Horsham	5–3 A.E.T	Goldstone Ground	N/A	
81	1968–69	Eastbourne United	Horsham	3–0	Goldstone Ground	N/A	
82	1969–70	Littlehampton Town	Worthing	1–0	Goldstone Ground	N/A	
83	1970–71	Lewes	Eastbourne United	2–0	Goldstone Ground	N/A	
84	1971–72	Horsham	Whitehawk	2–1	Goldstone Ground	N/A	
85	1972–73	Ringmer	Eastbourne Town	1–0	Goldstone Ground	N/A	
86	1973–74	Horsham	Worthing	2–1	Goldstone Ground	N/A	
87	1974–75	Worthing	Lewes	1–0	Goldstone Ground	N/A	
88	1975–76	Horsham	Hastings United F.C. (1948)	2–1	Goldstone Ground	N/A	
89	1976–77	Worthing	Southwick	2–0	Goldstone Ground	N/A	
90	1977–78	Worthing	Eastbourne Town	4–0	Goldstone Ground	N/A	
91	1978–79	Hastings United F.C. (1948)	Horsham	1–0	Goldstone Ground	N/A	
92	1979–80	Bognor Regis Town	Lewes	1–0	Goldstone Ground	N/A	
93	1980–81	Bognor Regis Town	Ringmer	4–1	Goldstone Ground	N/A	
94	1981–82	Bognor Regis Town	Peacehaven & Telscombe	1–0	Goldstone Ground	N/A	
95	1982–83	Bognor Regis Town	Lewes	3–0	Goldstone Ground	N/A	
96	1983–84	Bognor Regis Town	Littlehampton Town	1–0	Goldstone Ground	N/A	
97	1984–85	Lewes	Bognor Regis Town	2–2, replay 2–1	Goldstone Ground/replay at Woodside Road	N/A	
98	1985–86	Steyning Town	Hastings Town	1–0	Goldstone Ground	N/A	
99	1986–87	Bognor Regis Town	Arundel	1–1, replay 3–0	Goldstone Ground/replay at Woodside Road	N/A	
100	1987–88	Brighton & Hove Albion	Lewes	3–0	Goldstone Ground	N/A	
101	1988–89	Steyning Town	Hastings Town	3–2	Goldstone Ground	N/A	
102	1989–90	Crawley Town	Eastbourne United	2–1	Goldstone Ground	1,531	
103	1990–91	Crawley Town	Littlehampton Town	2–1	Goldstone Ground	1,682	
104	1991–92	Brighton & Hove Albion	Langney Sports	1–0	Goldstone Ground	1,336	
105	1992–93	Wick	Oakwood	3–1	Goldstone Ground	N/A	
106	1993–94	Brighton & Hove Albion	Peacehaven & Telscombe	1–0	Goldstone Ground	N/A	
107	1994–95	Brighton & Hove Albion	Bognor Regis Town	2–0	Goldstone Ground	N/A	
108	1995–96	Hastings Town	Crawley Town	1–0	Woodside Road	1,153	
109	1996–97	St Leonards	Saltdean United	2–1	Woodside Road	N/A	
110	1997–98	Hastings Town	Burgess Hill Town	2–1	Broadfield Stadium	1,256	
111	1998–99	Worthing	Hastings Town	3–0	Broadfield Stadium	N/A	
112	1999-00	Brighton & Hove Albion	Hastings Town	1–1, 4–3 pens	Priory Lane	1,355	
113	2000–01	Lewes	Bognor Regis Town	2–1	Priory Lane	1,031	
114	2001–02	Eastbourne Borough	Lewes	2–1	Priory Lane	1,588	
115	2002–03	Crawley Town	Eastbourne Borough	0–0, 6–5 pens	Priory Lane	1,705	
116	2003–04	Brighton & Hove Albion	Worthing	2–0	Priory Lane	1,022	
117	2004–05	Crawley Town	Ringmer	2–0	Priory Lane	1,009	
118	2005–06	Lewes	Horsham	3–1	Priory Lane	880	
119	2006–07	Brighton & Hove Albion	Worthing	2–0	Priory Lane	873	
120	2007–08	Brighton & Hove Albion	Crawley Town	1–0	Priory Lane	685	
121	2008–09	Eastbourne Borough	Brighton & Hove Albion	0–0, 1–0 A.E.T	Priory Lane	1,204	
122	2009–10	Brighton & Hove Albion	Bognor Regis Town	4–0	Priory Lane	605	
123	2010–11	Brighton & Hove Albion	Eastbourne Borough	2–0	Falmer Stadium	7,104	
124	2011–12	Whitehawk	Crawley Down	2–1	Falmer Stadium	1,896	
125	2012–13	Brighton & Hove Albion	Bognor Regis Town	4–0	Falmer Stadium	2,435	
126	2013–14	Peacehaven & Telscombe	Bognor Regis Town	3–0	Falmer Stadium	2,003	
127	2014–15	Whitehawk	Lewes	5–0	Falmer Stadium	2,585	
128	2015–16	Eastbourne Borough	Worthing	1–0	Falmer Stadium	2,899	
129	2016–17	Brighton & Hove Albion	Crawley Town	0–0, 3–0 A.E.T	Falmer Stadium	1,316	
130	2017–18	Brighton & Hove Albion	Crawley Town	2–1	Falmer Stadium	1,503	
131	2018–19	Bognor Regis Town	Burgess Hill Town	1–1, 2–1 A.E.T.	Falmer Stadium	1,616	
–	2019–20	Competition cancelled due to COVID-19 pandemic					
–	2020–21	Competition cancelled due to COVID-19 pandemic					
132	2021–22	Brighton & Hove Albion	Worthing	4–2	Falmer Stadium	3,087	
133	2022–23	Worthing	Bognor Regis Town	0–0, 8–7 pens	Falmer Stadium	2,594	
134	2023–24	Horsham	Hastings United	3–0	Falmer Stadium	4,869	
135	2024–25	Horsham	Littlehampton Town	1–0	Falmer Stadium	3,055	
136	2025–26	Three Bridges	Brighton & Hove Albion	1–1, 5–4 pens	Falmer Stadium	1,506	

== Final venues ==
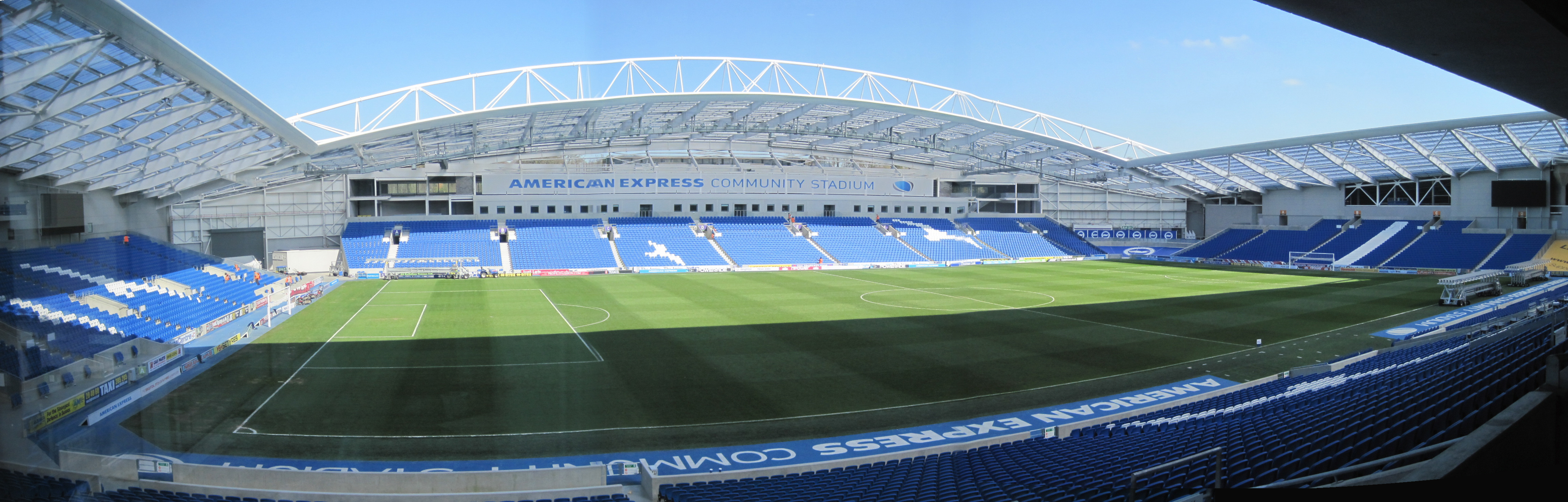
The final of the Sussex Senior Cup has been played at Falmer Stadium since 2011

For rounds before the semi-final stage, the venue of each match is determined when the fixtures are drawn; the first club drawn in a fixture is usually the home team and matches are played at the club's home ground. The semi-finals are played at a neutral venue, usually at the Sussex FA at Culver Road in Lancing.

The final of the Sussex Senior Cup was held at Preston Park in Brighton for the first four competitions, from 1883 to 1886. It was then held at the County Cricket Ground in Hove for 18 editions of the cup, with the exception of the 1891 season, which was held on a league basis. In 1906 the first cup final took place to have been played at the Goldstone Ground in Hove. At the time the Goldstone Ground was the home stadium of Brighton and Hove Albion, which for some time was Sussex's only professional football club. The Goldstone Ground was known to have hosted the final of the Sussex Senior Cup a record 55 times between 1906 and 1995. Other stadiums to have hosted the Sussex Senior Cup include The Dripping Pan in Lewes (held 14 times between 1920 and 1947), The Trafalgar Ground in Newhaven (held twice in 1931 and 1932), Woodside Road in Worthing (held 7 times between 1934 and 1997), The Saffrons in Eastbourne (held once in 1936), Queen Street in Horsham (held once in 1949), Broadfield Stadium in Crawley (held twice in 1998 and 1999) and Priory Lane in Eastbourne (held 11 times between 2000 and 2010). Since 2011 the final of the Sussex Senior Cup has been played at the Falmer Stadium in Brighton.

== Records ==
- Most wins: 22:
  - Worthing (1893, 1904, 1908, 1914, 1920, 1923, 1927, 1929, 1935, 1940, 1945, 1946, 1947, 1952, 1957, 1959, 1961, 1975, 1977, 1978, 1999, 2023)
- Most consecutive wins: 5
  - Bognor Regis Town (1980, 1981, 1982, 1983, 1984)
- Most appearances in a final: 33
  - Worthing
- Most consecutive appearances in a final: 6
  - Bognor Regis Town (1980, 1981, 1982, 1983, 1984, 1985)
- Most defeats in a final: 13
  - Lewes
- Biggest win: 7 goals:
  - Eastbourne 7-0 Hastings and St Leonards (1903)
- Most goals in final: 11:
  - Southwick 8-3 Haywards Heath (1937)

== Statistics ==
=== Performance by club ===
Club	Winners	Runners up	Winning years
Worthing	22	11	1893, 1904, 1908, 1914, 1920, 1923, 1927, 1929, 1935, 1940, 1945, 1946, 1947, 1952, 1957, 1959, 1961, 1975, 1977, 1978, 1999, 2023
Brighton & Hove Albion	15	2	1943, 1988, 1992, 1994, 1995, 2000, 2004, 2007, 2008, 2010, 2011, 2013, 2017, 2018, 2022
Eastbourne Town	12	9	1890, 1891, 1894, 1895, 1899, 1900, 1901, 1903, 1922, 1932, 1933, 1953
Southwick	10	7	1897, 1911, 1913, 1925, 1928, 1930, 1931, 1937, 1948, 1968
Bognor Regis Town	9	8	1955, 1956, 1980, 1981, 1982, 1983, 1984, 1987, 2019
Horsham	9	8	1934, 1939, 1950, 1954, 1972, 1974, 1976, 2024, 2025
Eastbourne United	6	6	1960, 1963, 1964, 1966, 1967, 1969
Lewes	5	13	1965, 1971, 1985, 2001, 2006
Hastings United	4	8	1936, 1938, 1996, 1998
Crawley Town	4	5	1990, 1991, 2003, 2005
Whitehawk	4	2	1951, 1962, 2012, 2015
Burgess Hill Town	3	4	1884, 1885, 1886
Eastbourne Borough	3	3	2002, 2009, 2016
Hove	3	1	1907, 1909, 1910
Haywards Heath Town	2	3	1942, 1958
Littlehampton Town	2	4	1949, 1970
Lancing College	2	2	1887, 1888
Shoreham	2	2	1902, 1906
Royal Corps of Signals	2	0	1921, 1924
Steyning Town	2	0	1986, 1989
Chichester	1	4	1926
Brighton College	1	2	1889
Ringmer	1	2	1973
Peacehaven & Telscombe	1	2	2014
Hastings United (1948)	1	1	1979
Brighton Rangers	1	0	1883
Royal Irish Rifles	1	0	1886
Brighton Hornets	1	0	1892
Eastbourne Swifts	1	0	1898
Eastbourne Old Town	1	0	1905
St Leonards Amateurs	1	0	1912
RAF (Ford)	1	0	1944
Wick	1	0	1993
St Leonards	1	0	1997
Three Bridges	1	0	2026
Ardingly College	0	1	-
Brighton and Hove Rangers	0	1	-
Hailsham Town	0	1	-
Helmston	0	1	-
East Grinstead Town	0	1	-
Eastbourne St Mary's	0	1	-
Signalling School	0	1	-
Skyways F.C.	0	1	-
Newhaven	0	1	-
Selsey	0	1	-
Arundel	0	1	-
Oakwood	0	1	-
Crawley Down	0	1	-

=== Total cups won by town or city ===
34 different clubs have won the cup, and the majority of cups have been won by clubs from Brighton and Hove, Eastbourne and Worthing.

Town or city	Number of cups won	Clubs
Brighton and Hove	24	Brighton & Hove Albion (15), Whitehawk (4), Hove F.C. (3), Brighton Hornets (1), Brighton College (1), Brighton Rangers (1)
Eastbourne	23	Eastbourne Town (12), Eastbourne United (6), Eastbourne Borough(3), Eastbourne Old Town (1), Eastbourne Swifts (1)
Worthing	22	Worthing (22)
Southwick	10	Southwick (10)
Bognor Regis	9	Bognor Regis Town (9)
Horsham	9	Horsham (9)
Hastings	7	Hastings United (4), Hastings United (1948) (1), St Leonards Amateurs (1), St Leonards (1)
Crawley	5	Crawley Town (4), Three Bridges (1)
Lewes	5	Lewes (5)
UK armed forces	4	Royal Corps of Signals (2), RAF (Ford) (1), Royal Irish Rifles (1)
Burgess Hill	3	Burgess Hill (3)
Littlehampton	3	Littlehampton Town (2), Wick (1)
Lancing	2	Lancing College (2)
Haywards Heath	2	Haywards Heath Town (2)
Shoreham-by-Sea	2	Shoreham (2)
Steyning	2	Steyning Town (2)
Chichester	1	Chichester City (1)
Ringmer	1	Ringmer (1)
Peacehaven	1	Peacehaven & Telscombe (1)

== See also ==
- Sussex RUR Cup
- Sport in Sussex
