= Darren Baker (footballer) =

English footballer (born 1965)

Personal information
- Full name: Darren Spencer Baker
- Date of birth: 28 June 1965 (age 61)
- Place of birth: Wednesbury, Staffordshire, England
- Position: Midfielder

Youth career
- Wrexham

Senior career*
Years	Team	Apps	(Gls)
1982–1984	Wrexham	24	(1)
- Bangor City
- * Club domestic league appearances and goals

Darren Spencer Baker (born 28 June 1965) is an English former professional footballer, who played as a midfielder. He made appearances in the English Football League with Wrexham. He also played in the Welsh League for Bangor City.
