= 2021–22 Southern Combination Football League =

The 2021–22 Southern Combination Football League season was the 97th in the history of the competition, which lies at levels 9 and 10 of the English football league system.

The provisional club allocations for steps 5 and 6 were announced by The Football Association on 18 May.

After the abandonment of the 2019–20 and 2020–21 seasons due to the COVID-19 pandemic, a number of promotions were decided on a points per game basis over the previous two seasons.

== Premier Division ==
Southern Combination League Premier Division
- Season: 2021–22
- Dates: 31 July 2021 – 30 April 2022
- Champions: Littlehampton Town
- Promoted: Littlehampton Town
- Relegated: East Preston
- Matches: 380
- Goals: 1,305 (3.43 per match)
- Top goalscorer: Joseph Benn (39 goals)
- Biggest home win: Peacehaven & Telscombe 10–0 Loxwood (6 November 2021)
- Biggest away win: East Preston 1–12 Littlehampton Town (11 January 2022)
- Highest scoring: Crawley Down Gatwick 11–2 East Preston (26 March 2022)
- Longest winning run: 11 matches Saltdean United
- Longest unbeaten run: 20 matches Bexhill United
- Longest losing run: 14 matches East Preston
- Highest attendance: 1092; Littlehampon Town 2–0 Bexhill United (23 April 2022)
- Lowest attendance: 25; AFC Varndeanians 1–4 Horsham YMCA (13 November 2021)
- Total attendance: 46,684
- Average attendance: 122.9

The Premier Division consisted of 20 clubs, including 17 clubs from the previous season, and three clubs, promoted from Division One:

- AFC Varndeanians
- Bexhill United
- Littlehampton Town

=== League table ===
Pos	Team	Pld	W	D	L	GF	GA	GD	Pts	Promotion, qualification or relegation
1	Littlehampton Town	38	29	4	5	130	48	+82	91	Promoted to the Isthmian League
2	Saltdean United	38	27	6	5	104	31	+73	87	Retented at Step 5 (Note: Saltdean United failed to meet ground grading standards and were not promoted.)
3	Newhaven	38	23	11	4	94	36	+58	80	Qualified for inter-step play-off (Note: Contested an inter-step play-off match as one of the six third-from-bottom clubs with the fewest points per game (PPG) from Step 5 at the end of the 2021–22 season against one of the nine runners-up with the most PPG from the eight divisions at Step 4. The winner stayed at Step 4 for the 2022–23 season, while the loser remained at Step 5.)
4	Bexhill United	38	22	11	5	83	39	+44	77	
5	Eastbourne United	38	20	7	11	75	45	+30	67	
6	Eastbourne Town	38	20	7	11	74	45	+29	67	
7	Broadbridge Heath	38	19	6	13	71	47	+24	63	
8	Peacehaven & Telscombe	38	17	9	12	72	46	+26	60	
9	Pagham	38	18	5	15	63	59	+4	59	Transferred to the Wessex League
10	Little Common	38	14	10	14	65	64	+1	52	
11	Crawley Down Gatwick	38	15	6	17	83	67	+16	51	
12	Lingfield	38	14	4	20	58	73	−15	46	
13	Horsham YMCA	38	11	8	19	44	73	−29	41	
14	AFC Uckfield Town	38	8	15	15	32	44	−12	39	
15	Alfold	38	11	6	21	44	72	−28	39	
16	Hassocks	38	9	11	18	46	75	−29	38	
17	Steyning Town	38	9	9	20	41	92	−51	36	
18	AFC Varndeanians	38	8	8	22	58	89	−31	32	
19	Loxwood	38	8	5	25	37	99	−62	29	Reprieved from relegation (Note: Loxwood were reprieved as one of 12 clubs with the most PPG out of 16 that were second-from-bottom at Step 5.)
20	East Preston	38	1	6	31	31	161	−130	9	Relegated to Division One

Source: scfl.org.uk
Rules for classification: 1) points; 2) goal difference; 3) number of goals scored; 4) number of matches won; 5) head-to-head results

=== Inter-step play-off ===
30 April 2022	Lancing	2–1	Newhaven	Lancing
15:00	52' 56' Modou Jammeh	Report	47' Lee Robinson	Stadium: Culver Road; Attendance: 702

=== Results table ===
Home \ Away	UCK	VAR	ALF	BEX	BBH	CDG	EPR	EBT	EBU	HSK	HYM	LIN	LCM	LIT	LOX	NEW	PAG	PAT	SDU	STT
AFC Uckfield Town		4–1	1–0	0–0	0–0	3–6	0–0	1–0	0–2	0–1	2–1	0–0	2–2	1–2	3–1	1–1	0–0	0–0	0–3	1–1
AFC Varndeanians	1–1		1–2	0–2	2–4	2–2	7–0	2–1	2–2	1–0	1–4	3–4	3–0	4–6	2–1	1–4	2–3	2–3	0–1	2–3
Alfold	2–0	1–1		2–3	1–0	2–2	3–0	2–0	1–0	0–1	0–1	1–1	1–3	1–2	0–3	0–3	2–2	2–5	0–6	3–1
Bexhill United	1–1	4–1	2–1		3–2	2–2	6–1	3–1	2–2	1–1	2–0	2–1	5–0	3–1	2–2	0–0	1–0	1–0	3–1	0–0
Broadbridge Heath	1–0	3–0	8–0	1–1		0–1	3–2	1–2	1–2	0–0	1–0	2–1	5–1	1–2	1–1	1–3	2–3	2–1	2–1	2–0
Crawley Down Gatwick	3–1	2–2	1–1	2–3	1–2		11–2	0–2	4–2	1–3	9–0	2–1	1–0	1–3	1–2	1–4	5–0	0–1	0–2	8–0
East Preston	0–1	1–1	2–2	1–7	0–3	0–4		0–9	1–5	4–1	0–1	1–7	1–3	1–12	0–3	1–1	1–3	0–6	2–3	0–5
Eastbourne Town	0–0	2–0	5–1	1–3	1–1	1–3	3–0		0–1	5–2	0–0	2–1	2–2	2–1	2–0	3–0	0–3	2–1	1–1	3–0
Eastbourne United Association	3–0	3–0	0–2	2–1	0–2	0–1	2–0	2–0		1–0	2–1	7–0	1–1	1–3	4–0	2–1	1–1	0–0	1–1	1–3
Hassocks	2–2	4–1	2–1	1–4	1–5	0–0	5–2	1–2	0–3		1–2	1–1	0–3	2–6	0–0	0–5	1–2	2–2	1–1	2–0
Horsham YMCA	1–2	0–3	3–0	1–1	1–1	3–1	3–3	0–2	2–4	1–0		2–6	1–1	1–4	2–0	1–4	2–1	2–0	0–4	2–2
Lingfield	1–0	1–4	1–2	1–0	0–2	2–0	5–0	1–4	0–6	1–2	1–1		1–2	1–6	3–0	1–2	2–0	2–1	1–2	0–2
Little Common	0–0	5–0	1–0	1–2	2–1	3–1	7–2	0–1	2–0	2–2	3–0	1–3		0–4	0–4	1–1	2–3	2–2	1–2	2–1
Littlehampton Town	1–0	5–0	3–2	2–0	3–2	5–2	3–0	3–3	4–0	4–2	4–0	3–1	4–2		3–0	0–0	2–2	3–1	3–4	8–0
Loxwood	0–4	1–1	2–1	0–5	1–2	1–3	1–0	1–1	0–2	1–0	0–3	0–1	4–3	0–2		1–10	2–5	0–1	0–6	2–3
Newhaven	2–1	3–2	1–0	2–0	0–1	5–1	3–0	2–0	3–0	1–1	2–0	3–0	2–0	3–3	4–2		3–0	3–3	2–2	3–0
Pagham	1–0	1–2	1–2	0–1	2–1	1–0	6–2	3–2	2–3	0–1	1–0	4–0	0–4	2–3	1–0	0–4		2–2	1–0	0–1
Peacehaven & Telscombe	1–0	3–0	0–1	1–1	3–0	1–0	6–0	1–4	2–0	3–2	2–1	0–1	1–1	2–1	10–0	2–2	0–2		3–0	2–1
Saltdean United	3–0	3–0	1–0	4–1	5–0	3–0	9–0	1–2	1–1	6–0	2–0	1–0	1–1	1–0	5–1	3–1	2–1	2–0		5–2
Steyning Town	0–0	0–0	3–2	0–5	0–5	0–1	1–1	0–3	1–7	1–1	1–1	2–4	0–1	0–6	3–0	1–1	1–2	2–0	0–6	

Source: SCFL Fixtures and Results
Legend: Blue = home team win; Yellow = draw; Red = away team win.

=== Results by matchday ===
Matchday	1	2	3	4	5	6	7	8	9	10	11	12	13	14	15	16	17	18	19	20	21	22	23	24	25	26	27	28	29	30	31	32	33	34	35	36	37	38
AFC Uckfield Town	L	D	D	D	W	L	W	L	L	L	D	L	D	W	L	D	W	D	L	L	D	D	L	L	D	D	D	L	W	D	W	W	D	L	W	D	L	L
AFC Varndeanians	L	L	L	L	L	L	L	L	L	D	L	L	L	D	D	D	L	L	L	L	L	D	W	L	D	W	L	W	D	L	W	W	W	W	W	L	L	D
Alfold	L	W	W	W	W	L	W	L	W	W	L	L	L	D	L	L	D	L	L	L	D	D	D	L	W	L	L	L	L	W	W	D	L	W	L	L	L	L
Bexhill United	W	L	L	W	D	W	L	W	W	W	D	D	W	W	D	D	D	W	W	W	W	D	D	W	W	W	W	L	D	W	W	W	D	W	D	W	W	L
Broadbridge Heath	L	W	L	W	W	D	W	W	W	D	D	L	L	W	W	W	W	D	D	W	W	L	L	W	W	W	L	L	L	W	L	L	L	W	L	W	D	W
Crawley Down Gatwick	L	W	L	W	L	D	W	W	W	D	W	L	W	L	L	D	L	W	W	L	W	W	L	W	L	W	L	L	D	D	W	L	W	L	L	L	D	L
East Preston	D	L	L	L	D	L	L	L	L	L	D	L	L	D	L	W	L	L	L	L	L	L	D	D	L	L	L	L	L	L	L	L	L	L	L	L	L	L
Eastbourne Town	W	W	W	D	L	L	D	L	L	W	W	D	D	D	W	W	W	W	D	W	W	W	L	L	W	W	W	L	W	L	W	L	W	W	L	D	L	W
Eastbourne United Association	L	L	L	W	W	L	L	L	L	W	W	W	W	D	W	W	D	D	W	W	D	W	L	D	W	W	W	W	L	D	W	W	W	L	W	L	W	D
Hassocks	L	L	D	L	L	W	D	L	L	L	D	W	L	L	L	L	W	L	D	D	L	D	W	D	L	L	W	W	L	D	L	W	W	D	L	D	D	W
Horsham YMCA	L	L	L	W	W	D	W	D	L	L	D	L	L	W	D	W	L	W	L	D	W	W	L	L	D	L	L	W	L	L	W	L	L	L	W	L	D	D
Lingfield	W	W	L	L	D	W	L	W	L	L	L	L	W	D	L	W	L	W	W	L	W	L	D	L	W	W	L	L	L	L	L	L	L	L	W	W	W	D
Little Common	W	D	L	D	W	W	W	D	W	W	W	L	D	W	L	L	D	D	L	L	L	L	D	D	D	W	L	W	W	L	L	L	W	W	W	L	L	D
Littlehampton Town	W	W	L	W	W	W	W	W	W	W	W	W	D	D	W	W	L	W	L	W	W	W	W	W	D	L	W	W	D	W	W	W	W	L	W	W	W	W
Loxwood	L	L	W	L	L	D	D	L	L	L	L	W	L	L	W	D	L	L	L	L	W	L	L	L	W	L	L	L	D	D	L	L	L	L	L	L	W	W
Newhaven	D	W	W	L	W	W	W	D	W	W	W	D	D	W	L	W	D	W	W	L	D	W	D	W	W	D	W	W	W	D	W	W	W	D	L	W	D	W
Pagham	L	W	W	W	L	W	W	W	W	W	L	W	W	W	L	L	L	W	W	W	W	L	W	D	W	D	D	L	D	D	L	L	L	L	W	L	L	L
Peacehaven & Telscombe	W	L	W	W	W	L	L	L	L	L	L	D	W	L	D	W	W	D	W	D	W	L	W	L	D	L	W	L	D	W	D	W	W	W	W	W	D	D
Saltdean United	W	W	W	W	L	W	W	W	L	W	W	W	D	D	W	W	L	W	D	W	W	D	W	D	L	L	W	W	W	W	W	W	W	W	W	W	W	D
Steyning Town	W	W	D	L	L	L	L	D	L	L	W	L	W	D	L	L	L	W	L	L	L	D	W	D	W	D	L	L	L	L	L	L	W	L	W	D	D	D

Source: The FA Full-Time SCFL Premier Division
W = Win; D = Draw; L = Loss

=== Top scorers ===
Rank	Player	Club	Goals
1	Joseph Benn	Littlehampton Town	39
2	Charlie Pitcher	Crawley Down Gatwick	30
3	George Gaskin	Littlehampton Town	28
3	Jack Shonk	Bexhill United	28
5	Evan Archibald	Bexhill United	24
5	Jack Langford	Pagham	24
5	Alfie Rogers	Newhaven	24
5	Max Thompson	Eastbourne United	24
9	Rob Clarke	Steyning Town	22
10	Lewis Hole	Little Common	21

=== Stadia and locations ===
Map showing the location of teams in the Premier Division

Team	Location	Stadium	Capacity	Founded
AFC Varndeanians	Brighton (Withdean)	Withdean Stadium (groundshare with Brighton Electricity)	8,850	1929
AFC Uckfield Town	Framfield	The Oaks	600	2014
Alfold	Alfold Crossways	Alfold Recreation Ground	1,000	1923
Bexhill United	Bexhill-on-Sea	The Polegrove	1,000	2002
Broadbridge Heath	Broadbridge Heath	Broadbridge Heath Leisure Centre	1,000	1919
Crawley Down Gatwick	Crawley Down	The Haven Centre	1,000	1993
East Preston	Littlehampton (East Preston)	The Lashmar (groundshare with Littlehampton United)	1,000	1966
Eastbourne Town	Eastbourne	The Saffrons	4,500	1881
Eastbourne United	Eastbourne	The Oval	1,200	2003
Hassocks	Hassocks	The Beacon	1,000	1902
Horsham YMCA	Horsham	Gorings Mead	1,500	1898
Lingfield	Lingfield	The Sports Pavilion	2,000	1893
Little Common	Bexhill-on-Sea (Little Common)	The Oval (groundshare with Eastbourne United) until 12 December 2021	1,200	1966
Little Common	Bexhill-on-Sea (Little Common)	Little Common Recreation Ground from 12 December 2021	1,000	1966
Littlehampton Town	Littlehampton	St Flora Sportsfield	4,000	1896
Loxwood	Loxwood	Plaistow Road	1,000	1920
Newhaven	Newhaven	The Trafalgar Ground	3,000	1889
Pagham	Pagham	Nyetimber Lane	1,500	1903
Peacehaven & Telscombe	Peacehaven	The Sports Park	3,000	1923
Saltdean United	Brighton (Saltdean)	Hill Park	1,000	1966
Steyning Town	Steyning	The Shooting Field	2,000	1892

== Division One ==
Southern Combination League Division One
- Season: 2021–22
- Dates: 31 July 2021 – 30 April 2022
- Champions: Roffey
- Promoted: Roffey; Midhurst & Easebourne
- Relegated: Storrington
- Matches: 306
- Goals: 1,102 (3.6 per match)
- Top goalscorer: Joshua Neathey (33 goals)
- Biggest home win: Dorking Wanderers Reserves 11–1 Storrington (18 September 2021)
- Biggest away win: Storrington 0–6 Midhurst & Easebourne (28 August 2021)
- Highest scoring: Dorking Wanderers Reserves 11–1 Storrington (18 September 2021)
- Longest winning run: 7 matches Midhurst & Easebourne; Roffey
- Longest unbeaten run: 10 matches Shoreham
- Longest losing run: 10 matches Storrington
- Highest attendance: 325; Selsey 2–0 Godalming Town (16 April 2022)
- Lowest attendance: 10; Mile Oak 1–1 Oakwood (2 October 2021)
- Total attendance: 21,669
- Average attendance: 70.8

Division One increased to 18 clubs, including 13 clubs from the previous season, and five new clubs:

- Dorking Wanderers reserves, transferred from Combined Counties League Division One
- Epsom & Ewell, transferred from Combined Counties League Division One
- Forest Row, promoted from the Mid Sussex Football League
- Godalming Town, transferred from Combined Counties League Division One
- Montpelier Villa, promoted from Division Two

=== League table ===
Pos	Team	Pld	W	D	L	GF	GA	GD	Pts	Promotion, qualification or relegation
1	Roffey	34	23	6	5	85	44	+41	75	Promoted to the Premier Division
2	Midhurst & Easebourne	34	22	4	8	87	43	+44	70	Qualified for the play-offs, then promoted to the Premier Division
3	Dorking Wanderers reserves	34	22	3	9	84	45	+39	69	Ineligible for promotion (Note: Dorking Wanderers reserves were not permitted to take part in the play-offs as reserve sides could not compete above Step 6.)
4	Seaford Town	34	20	7	7	69	41	+28	67	Qualified for the play-offs
5	Shoreham	34	18	11	5	76	58	+18	65	Qualified for the play-offs
6	Epsom & Ewell	34	20	4	10	93	47	+46	64	Qualified for the play-offs
7	Godalming Town	34	16	10	8	57	46	+11	58	
8	Selsey	34	17	4	13	50	47	+3	55	
9	Montpelier Villa	34	13	6	15	75	76	−1	45	
10	Wick	34	12	8	14	50	53	−3	44	
11	Forest Row	34	12	8	14	65	75	−10	44	
12	Billingshurst	34	11	7	16	68	79	−11	40	
13	Mile Oak	34	10	7	17	53	69	−16	37	
14	Worthing United	34	10	6	18	33	62	−29	36	
15	Oakwood	34	6	9	19	38	66	−28	27	
16	Hailsham Town	34	7	6	21	41	72	−31	27	Reprieved from relegation (Note: All third-from-bottom sides at Step 6 were reprieved from relegation. The top 15 second-from-bottom sides were also reprieved on a PPG basis.)
17	Arundel	34	4	8	22	49	89	−40	20	Reprieved from relegation
18	Storrington	34	4	4	26	29	90	−61	16	Relegated to Division Two

Source: The FA Full-Time Division 1 Table
Rules for classification: 1) points; 2) goal difference; 3) number of goals scored; 4) number of matches won; 5) head-to-head results

=== Play-offs ===
Semi-finals
2	Midhurst & Easebourne	2
6	Epsom & Ewell	1
4	Seaford Town	0
5	Shoreham	2

Final
2	Midhurst & Easebourne	1
5	Shoreham	0

==== Semi-finals ====
30 April 2022	Midhurst & Easebourne	2–1	Epsom & Ewell	Easebourne
15:00		Report		Stadium: The Rotherfield

30 April 2022	Seaford Town	0–2	Shoreham	Seaford
15:00		Report		Stadium: The Crouch

==== Final ====
7 May 2022	Midhurst & Easebourne	1–0	Shoreham	Easebourne
15:00	74' Bedford			Stadium: The Rotherfield

=== Results table ===
Home \ Away	ARU	BIL	DOR	EPS	FOR	GOD	HAI	MDE	MOK	MON	OAK	ROF	SEA	SEL	SHO	STO	WIC	WOR
Arundel		1–2	1–2	1–4	2–3	1–1	3–3	0–3	1–3	3–1	2–2	1–4	0–4	1–3	2–4	5–0	0–0	4–1
Billingshurst	3–1		0–3	4–3	1–2	5–1	3–0	0–3	2–4	1–2	0–0	2–2	2–2	2–1	1–3	3–5	1–5	5–0
Dorking Wanderers Reserves	2–1	2–1		3–0	6–1	0–0	1–3	1–2	1–0	7–2	3–0	2–0	3–2	2–0	2–4	11–1	1–2	4–0
Epsom & Ewell	6–2	5–1	1–2		2–0	1–2	2–1	2–1	7–1	4–0	6–0	0–0	1–0	4–0	8–0	1–1	3–2	0–1
Forest Row	4–3	1–1	2–3	0–3		5–1	2–2	3–5	3–1	5–3	0–1	4–3	1–7	0–2	0–3	6–1	0–0	2–0
Godalming Town	7–0	1–2	1–2	3–2	2–1		1–0	3–0	2–1	2–2	1–0	1–0	2–2	3–1	1–1	2–0	1–0	1–1
Hailsham Town	1–1	1–5	0–2	1–2	3–1	1–3		0–2	1–0	3–1	1–1	1–4	1–3	0–1	3–4	4–3	0–1	2–1
Midhurst & Easebourne	2–2	1–1	6–1	4–2	0–2	1–1	4–1		2–1	3–0	2–1	1–3	1–2	2–1	1–2	2–0	3–1	6–1
Mile Oak	2–2	5–0	0–5	3–1	2–2	0–0	4–0	1–2		1–1	1–1	0–4	1–2	2–1	2–2	2–4	4–3	0–2
Montpelier Villa	2–1	5–2	2–3	5–4	1–2	4–0	3–0	3–1	3–4		7–0	1–3	0–0	1–0	3–3	4–1	1–2	1–1
Oakwood	4–0	5–3	1–5	2–3	0–0	0–2	1–1	0–3	2–1	1–2		1–2	0–2	2–1	0–1	0–0	0–2	6–5
Roffey	2–1	3–2	4–1	0–0	2–1	4–3	2–1	1–1	3–1	8–2	3–1		2–0	2–1	5–3	1–2	6–2	5–1
Seaford Town	2–1	2–1	0–0	2–2	5–4	3–2	2–1	0–4	4–0	2–1	4–1	0–1		2–2	2–1	2–1	0–0	2–0
Selsey	2–1	3–3	2–0	0–4	1–1	2–0	1–0	2–5	2–1	1–0	2–1	3–0	3–1		1–1	3–2	1–0	1–0
Shoreham	4–1	1–1	1–1	3–1	3–4	1–1	4–1	4–3	2–2	4–2	1–1	1–1	0–5	3–2		2–0	3–1	0–0
Storrington	0–1	1–3	0–2	0–3	1–1	1–2	0–2	0–6	0–1	1–6	0–5	2–1	0–1	0–1	0–3		1–2	0–1
Wick	2–2	2–3	2–1	2–3	0–1	2–2	2–1	1–2	2–1	2–3	3–0	1–1	2–1	1–0	0–2	0–0		2–2
Worthing United	4–1	3–1	3–0	0–3	4–1	0–2	1–1	0–2	1–0	1–0	0–4	1–2	0–1	0–3	0–2	0–2	2–1	

Source: The FA Full-Time SCFL Results
Legend: Blue = home team win; Yellow = draw; Red = away team win.

=== Results by matchday ===
Matchday	1	2	3	4	5	6	7	8	9	10	11	12	13	14	15	16	17	18	19	20	21	22	23	24	25	26	27	28	29	30	31	32	33	34
Arundel	L	L	L	L	L	L	W	D	W	W	D	D	L	L	L	D	D	L	D	L	L	W	D	L	L	L	L	D	L	L	L	L	L	L
Billingshurst	L	W	L	L	L	L	W	W	L	W	D	D	L	D	D	D	W	L	W	W	W	D	L	L	W	L	W	W	L	L	D	L	L	L
Dorking Wanderers Reserves	W	W	W	D	L	L	W	W	W	W	W	W	L	W	W	W	L	D	L	L	W	L	W	W	D	L	W	W	W	W	W	L	W	W
Epsom & Ewell	W	L	D	W	L	W	W	W	D	L	W	W	W	W	W	D	W	W	L	W	L	L	L	W	L	W	W	L	W	D	W	W	L	L
Forest Row	L	W	W	W	L	L	L	W	L	L	D	W	W	D	D	D	D	W	L	L	L	W	W	W	L	L	L	D	W	L	L	W	D	W
Godalming Town	W	L	L	W	W	D	W	D	L	L	W	D	L	D	D	D	W	W	D	W	W	W	L	W	W	L	W	W	D	W	W	L	D	D
Hailsham Town	L	L	L	L	L	W	L	W	D	D	L	W	L	L	L	D	L	L	W	D	L	L	L	L	W	D	D	L	W	W	L	L	L	L
Midhurst & Easebourne	W	W	W	W	W	W	W	L	W	W	D	W	L	D	W	D	L	L	W	W	L	W	W	W	W	W	L	L	W	W	W	L	D	W
Mile Oak	L	L	L	L	W	D	L	L	L	D	L	L	L	L	W	D	L	W	L	W	W	D	W	D	L	D	W	L	W	L	L	W	D	W
Montpelier Villa	L	W	W	W	L	D	W	L	L	D	L	W	W	D	W	W	L	D	W	L	L	L	W	L	W	L	L	L	L	L	W	L	D	W
Oakwood	L	L	L	W	W	L	L	D	L	D	W	W	L	D	L	L	D	W	L	W	L	L	L	W	D	L	D	L	L	L	D	W	D	L
Roffey	W	W	W	W	W	W	W	D	L	D	L	W	W	W	W	L	W	W	W	W	D	W	W	W	W	L	L	W	D	D	W	W	W	D
Seaford Town	L	W	W	D	W	D	L	W	W	L	W	W	D	D	L	D	W	W	W	W	W	W	W	L	L	L	W	W	D	W	W	W	W	D
Selsey	W	W	L	L	L	W	L	W	W	L	W	D	L	D	L	D	L	L	L	W	W	W	L	W	D	W	L	W	W	L	W	W	W	W
Shoreham	W	L	W	W	W	D	W	W	D	W	D	W	L	L	D	W	D	W	D	D	L	W	L	W	W	D	D	W	D	W	W	W	W	D
Storrington	L	L	D	L	L	L	W	L	W	L	L	W	L	D	L	L	W	L	L	L	L	L	L	L	L	L	L	D	L	L	L	D	L	L
Wick	W	L	L	L	W	L	W	L	L	W	D	L	D	W	D	W	L	W	D	L	L	W	L	W	W	W	D	D	D	L	L	D	W	L
Worthing United	W	W	W	L	D	L	L	W	L	L	L	L	L	W	L	L	L	L	D	L	D	D	L	L	W	L	D	W	W	W	L	L	L	W

Source: The FA Full-Time SCFL Division 1
W = Win; D = Draw; L = Loss

=== Top scorers ===
Rank	Player	Club	Goals
1	Joshua Neathey	Roffey	33
2	Jamie Byatt	Epsom & Ewell	28
2	Callum Connor	Seaford Town	28
4	Tom Underwood	Forest Row	26
5	Maxwell Leitch	Dorking Wanderers Reserves	24
6	Luke Miller	Epsom & Ewell	19
7	Conan Torpey	Dorking Wanderers Reserves	17
8	Marcus Bedford	Midhurst & Easebourne	16
8	Conor Bull	Wick	16
8	Marcus Richmond	Montpelier Villa	16

=== Stadia and locations ===
Map showing the location of teams in Division One

Team	Location	Stadium	Capacity	Founded
Arundel	Arundel	Mill Road	2,200	1889
Billingshurst	Billingshurst	Jubilee Fields	—	1891
Dorking Wanderers Reserves	Dorking	Meadowbank	3,000	2015
Epsom & Ewell	Leatherhead	Fetcham Grove (groundshare with Leatherhead)	3,400	1918
Forest Row	Crawley (Three Bridges)	Tinsley Lane (groundshare with Oakwood)	—	1892
Godalming Town	Godalming	Bill Kyte Stadium	3,000	1950
Hailsham Town	Hailsham	The Beaconsfield	2,000	1885
Midhurst & Easebourne	Easebourne	Rotherfield	—	1946
Mile Oak	Brighton (Mile Oak)	Mile Oak Recreation Ground	—	1960
Montpelier Villa	Lancing	Culver Road (groundshare with Lancing)	1,500	1991
Oakwood	Crawley (Three Bridges)	Tinsley Lane	—	1962
Roffey	Horsham (Roffey)	Bartholomew Way	—	1901
Seaford Town	Seaford	The Crouch	—	1888
Selsey	Selsey	Bunn Leisure Stadium	—	1903
Shoreham	Shoreham-by-Sea	Middle Road	2,000	1892
Storrington	Storrington	The Recreation Ground, Storrington	—	1883
Wick	Littlehampton (Wick)	Crabtree Park	2,000	1892
Worthing United	Worthing (Broadwater)	The Robert Albon Memorial Ground	1,504	1988

== Division Two ==
Southern Combination League Division Two
- Season: 2021–22
- Dates: 14 August 2021 – 16 April 2022
- Champions: Rustington
- Matches: 156
- Goals: 638 (4.09 per match)
- Top goalscorer: Josh Irish (22 goals)
- Biggest home win: Charlwood 14–1 Brighton Electricity (15 January 2022)
- Biggest away win: Brighton Electricity 0–8 Copthorne (9 October 2021)
- Highest scoring: Charlwood 14–1 Brighton Electricity (15 January 2022)
- Longest winning run: 8 matches Rustington
- Longest unbeaten run: 10 matches Jarvis Brook
- Longest losing run: 16 matches Worthing Town
- Highest attendance: 130; Bosham 2–2 Brighton Electricity (4 September 2021)
- Lowest attendance: 4 Rottingdean Village 1–0 Ferring (2 October 2021)
- Total attendance: 7079
- Average attendance: 45.4

Division Two consisted of 14 clubs, including 13 clubs from the previous season, and one new club:

- Southwater, transferred from the West Sussex Football League

Promotion from this division depended on ground grading as well as league position.

=== League table ===
Pos	Team	Pld	W	D	L	GF	GA	GD	Pts	
1	Rustington	24	21	0	3	68	23	+45	63	
2	Jarvis Brook	24	17	4	3	60	19	+41	55	
3	Charlwood	24	14	6	4	76	30	+46	48	
4	Copthorne	24	15	3	6	72	31	+41	48	
5	Littlehampton United	24	11	3	10	45	44	+1	36	Resigned from the league
6	St Francis Rangers	24	11	2	11	38	40	−2	35	
7	Rottingdean Village	24	10	3	11	42	40	+2	33	
8	Upper Beeding	24	10	2	12	48	37	+11	32	
9	Ferring	24	10	1	13	52	36	+16	31	
10	Southwater	24	8	5	11	46	48	−2	29	
11	Bosham	24	9	2	13	43	54	−11	29	
12	Brighton Electricity	24	2	1	21	26	121	−95	7	
13	Worthing Town	24	2	0	22	22	115	−93	6	
14	TD Shipley	0	0	0	0	0	0	0	0 (Note: TD Shipley resigned from the league on 27 August 2021 and their playing record of P2 W2 D0 L0 GF12 GA1 Pts6 was expunged.)	Resigned from the league, record expunged

Source: The FA Full-Time SCFL Division 2 Table
Rules for classification: 1) points; 2) goal difference; 3) number of goals scored.

=== Results table ===
Home \ Away	BOS	BRE	CHA	COP	FER	JAR	LIT	ROT	RUS	SOU	STF	UBD	WOR
Bosham		4–1	2–3	0–2	1–0	1–3	4–2	1–3	1–5	3–2	0–1	2–1	5–2
Brighton Electricity	0–4		1–6	0–8	1–5	1–2	1–7	1–4	1–7	5–3	0–4	1–4	2–3
Charlwood	2–1	14–1		6–2	2–2	0–0	1–1	4–0	5–3	2–1	1–2	2–0	9–2
Copthorne	2–2	6–1	3–3		3–1	2–2	3–0	H/W (Note: Copthorne v Rottingdean Village (12 March 2022) was declared a home walkover after Rottingdean Village forfeited the match.)	3–0	4–0	0–2	2–1	12–0
Ferring	2–0	8–0	3–2	0–1		0–2	4–0	3–1	A/W (Note: Ferring v Rustington (14 August 2021) was declared a away walkover after Ferring couldn't raise a team)	2–3	3–2	0–1	7–0
Jarvis Brook	7–1	3–0	0–1	3–1	2–0		3–1	3–0	4–0	1–1	4–1	3–0	H/W (Note: Jarvis Brook v Worthing Town (2 October 2021) was declared a away walkover after Worthing Town forfeited the match.)
Littlehampton United	3–0	3–1	0–0	1–0	2–1	3–3		1–2	0–1	2–4	3–2	1–4	4–1
Rottingdean Village	2–3	3–0	2–2	0–3	1–0	1–4	4–1		0–2	2–1	2–1	1–1	8–1
Rustington	2–1	10–0	2–1	5–2	3–2	1–0	3–0	2–1		4–0	H/W (Note: Rustington v St Francis Rangers (22 January 2022) was declared a home walkover after St Francis Rangers forfeited the match.)	1–0	5–0
Southwater	1–0	1–1	2–0	1–3	2–3	2–1	1–4	1–1	1–3		1–3	2–0	7–0
St Francis Rangers	2–2	3–2	0–5	0–2	0–3	0–2	1–2	1–0	0–4	2–2		1–0	5–0
Upper Beeding	3–1	8–1	0–1	3–2	4–1	1–3	0–2	4–3	0–2	2–2	0–1		3–0
Worthing Town	3–4	1–4	0–4	0–6	3–2	1–5	0–2	0–1	1–3	0–5	2–4	2–8	

Source: SCFL Fixtures and Results
Legend: Blue = home team win; Yellow = draw; Red = away team win.

=== Results by matchday ===
Matchday	1	2	3	4	5	6	7	8	9	10	11	12	13	14	15	16	17	18	19	20	21	22	23	24
Bosham	L	L	W	L	W	L	L	L	L	L	L	L	W	W	D	W	L	D	W	L	W	L	W	W
Brighton Electricity	L	L	L	L	L	L	L	L	L	L	W	L	L	W	L	L	L	L	L	L	L	L	D	L
Charlwood	D	W	L	W	W	W	D	W	W	L	W	W	W	W	W	W	L	D	L	W	D	D	D	W
Copthorne	L	L	W	D	W	L	W	W	W	W	L	W	W	D	W	W	L	W	W	W	D	W	W	L
Ferring	L	W	L	L	W	W	W	L	L	L	W	W	W	W	L	L	L	W	L	L	L	D	W	L
Jarvis Brook	W	W	W	W	L	W	D	W	W	W	W	W	D	D	W	L	W	W	L	W	W	W	D	W
Littlehampton United	W	W	W	W	L	L	D	L	L	W	L	W	W	L	W	L	L	W	L	W	D	W	L	D
Rottingdean Village	D	W	L	W	L	W	W	W	W	D	L	W	W	L	W	D	L	W	L	L	L	L	L	L
Rustington	W	W	W	W	W	W	L	W	W	W	W	L	W	W	W	W	W	W	W	W	L	W	W	W
Southwater	D	L	L	D	L	W	W	L	L	L	L	L	D	L	L	W	W	W	W	D	D	W	W	L
St Francis Rangers	L	L	L	W	W	W	W	L	W	W	L	W	W	L	D	L	W	L	L	L	W	D	L	W
Upper Beeding	W	W	L	W	D	L	W	L	W	W	L	L	L	L	L	W	W	W	L	W	L	D	L	L
Worthing Town	L	L	L	L	W	L	L	L	L	L	L	L	L	L	L	L	L	L	L	L	L	W	L	L

Source: The FA Full-Time SCFL Division 2
W = Win; D = Draw; L = Loss

=== Top scorers ===
Rank	Player	Club	Goals
1	Josh Irish	Rustington	22
2	Oscar Weddell	Copthorne	21
2	Kristian Harding	Upper Beeding	20
4	Daniel Sullivan	Copthorne	15
5	Harry Gardner	Ferring	13
6	Liam Edwards	Jarvis Brook	12
7	Kieron Howard	Rustington	11
7	Donnachadh Street	Charlwood	11
9	Pete Bailey	Littlehampton United	10
9	Ben Lewis	Southwater	10

=== Stadia and locations ===
Map showing the location of teams in Division Two

Team	Location	Stadium	Capacity	Founded
Bosham	Bosham	Walton Lane	—	1901
Brighton Electricity	Brighton (Withdean)	Withdean Stadium (groundshare with AFC Varndeanians)	8,850	—
Charlwood	Charlwood	Glovers Road	—	1901
Copthorne	Copthorne	King Georges Field	—	2004
Ferring	Ferring	The Glebelands	—	1952
Jarvis Brook	Crowborough	Limekiln	—	1888
Littlehampton United	Littlehampton	The Lashmar (groundshare with East Preston	1,000	1947
Rottingdean Village	Brighton (Rottingdean)	Rottingdean Sports Centre	—	—
Rustington	Rustington	Rustington Recreation Ground	—	1903
Southwater	Southwater	Southwater Sports Club	—	1958
St Francis Rangers	Haywards Heath	Colwell Ground	1000	2002
Upper Beeding	Upper Beeding	Memorial Playing Field	—	—
Worthing Town	Worthing	Palatine Park	—	1995

== Peter Bentley League Challenge Cup ==
Source: 2021-22 Peter Bentley Challenge Cup

=== First round ===
3 August 2021	Midhurst & Easebourne	5–2	Oakwood	Easebourne
19:45	Kieran Carter 8'; Harry Giles 23'; Robert Tambling 31'; William Essai 65'; James Liddiard 84'	Report	Sam Cane	Stadium: The Rotherfield; Attendance: 42

3 August 2021	Worthing United	1–7	Montpelier Villa	Worthing
19:45	Craig Nagle 10'	Report	Marcus Richmond 10' 33'; Michael Lloyd 14'; Harley Damaria 48' 60'; Mitchell Ford 57'; Ryan Walton 84'	Stadium: Robert Albon Memorial Ground; Attendance: 55

3 August 2021	Hailsham Town	0–4	Shoreham	Hailsham
19:30		Report	Ramon Santos 10' 89'; Paschal Nwamadi 61'; Johnathan Lansdale 65'	Stadium: Beaconsfield; Attendance: 72

3 August 2021	Forest Row	2–1	Epsom & Ewell	Crawley
19:45	Gillan Williams 89'; George Holah 90+2'	Report	Josh Uzun 19'	Stadium: Tinsley Lane; Attendance: 57

24 August 2021	Billingshurst	1–2	Dorking Wanderers Reserves	Billingshurst
19:45	Archie Goddard 75'	Report	Joshua Alder 19'; Reece Tierney 26'	Stadium: Jubilee Fields; Attendance: 54

3 August 2021	Selsey	0–2	Wick	Selsey
19:45		Report	David Crouch; Ben Gray	Stadium: High Street Ground; Attendance: 113

=== Second round ===
7 September 2021	Seaford Town	1-1 (5–4 p)	AFC Uckfield Town	Seaford
19:30	Alexander Saunders 15'	Report	Morgan Vale 15'	Stadium: The Crouch; Attendance: 98

7 September 2021	Newhaven	2-1	AFC Varndeanians	Newhaven
19:45	Charlie Bennett 14'; Robert Malila 90'	Report	Charlie Smith 60'	Stadium: Fort Road; Attendance: 55

7 September 2021	Midhurst & Easebourne	2-3	Crawley Down Gatwick	Easebourne
19:45	Marcus Bedford 7'; Charlie Cooper 30'	Report	Nicholas Sullivan 2'; Oli Leslie 16'; Joshua Brown 87'	Stadium: The Rotherfield; Attendance: 118

7 September 2021	Steyning Town	2-0	Montpelier Villa	Steyning
19:45	Josh Bradley 50'; Bobby Bennett 72'	Report		Stadium: The Shooting Field; Attendance: 78

7 September 2021	Little Common	0-0 (3–4 p)	Shoreham	Eastbourne
19:45		Report		Stadium: The Oval; Attendance: 68

7 September 2021	Broadbridge Heath	2-1	Lingfield	Broadbridge Heath
19:45	Charlie Parmiter 73'; Ben Cooksley 85'	Report	Sam Clements	Stadium: High Wood Hill Sports Ground; Attendance: 77

7 September 2021	Godalming Town	6-3	Forest Row	Godalming
19:45	Cameron Edwin 10' 49' 70'; Samuel Boultwood 51'; James Frudd 90'	Report	Tom Underwood 55'; Matthew Burroughs 60' 64'	Stadium: Bill Kyte Stadium; Attendance: 62

7 September 2021	Arundel	0-2	Pagham	Arundel
19:45		Report	Jamie Carroll 25'; Jack Langford 86'	Stadium: Mill Road; Attendance: 71

6 October 2021	Mile Oak	1-1 (4–1 p)	Eastbourne Town	Mile Oak
19:30	Harry Furnell 30'	Report	Aaron Capon 83'	Stadium: Mile Oak Recreation Ground; Attendance: 45

19 October 2021	Dorking Wanderers Reserves	1–2	Horsham YMCA	Dorking
19:45	Lee Dobbs 70'	Report	Charlie Maguire 25'; Mark Pritchard-Cave 90+5'	Stadium: Meadowbank; Attendance: 47

7 September 2021	East Preston	1–2	Littlehampton Town	Littlehampton
19:30	Lewis Broughton 62'	Report	Joseph Benn 41'; Scott Packer 45'	Stadium: The Lashmar; Attendance: 128

7 September 2021	Peacehaven & Telscombe	2–3	Bexhill United	Peacehaven
19:30	Max Hollobone 53'; Tyler Scrafton 85'	Report	Evan Archibald; Aaron Cook	Stadium: The Sports Park; Attendance: 133

7 September 2021	Storrington	0–3	Wick	Storrington
19:30		Report	Ben Gray 31'; Ronald Kardos 60'; Conor Bull 75'	Stadium: Storrington Recreation Ground; Attendance: 77

7 September 2021	Hassocks	1–5	Roffey	Hassocks
19:45	George Mitchell-Phillips 89'	Report	Josh Mahar 29' 55'; Kelvin Lucas 36' 55'; Jamie Wanstall 68'	Stadium: The Beacon; Attendance: 89

7 September 2021	Saltdean United	3–2	Eastbourne United	Saltdean
19:45	Reece Hallard 52'; Trevor McCreadie 77'; Joseph Shelley 85'	Report	George Landais 57'; Festos Kamara 72'	Stadium: Hill Park; Attendance: 57

7 September 2021	Alfold	4–2	Loxwood	Alfold
19:45	Ayden Richards 6'; Ashley Mutongerwa 60'; Martin Smith 65'; Sam Lemon 75'	Report	Luke Brodie 22'; Tom Frankland 35'; Samuel Packham 87'	Stadium: Alfold Recreation Ground; Attendance: 91

=== Third round ===
9 November 2021
19:45
Seaford Town

0–4
Report
Newhaven
- James Waters 16' 34'

          * Alfie Rogers  27'

* Aaron Winser 69'
Seaford
Stadium: The Crouch
Attendance: 205

7 December 2021	Steyning Town	0–4	Crawley Down Gatwick	Steyning
19:45		Report	Oli Leslie 23' 55' 60'; Oliver Moore 35'	Stadium: The Shooting Field; Attendance: 58

9 November 2021	Shoreham	1–1 (4–3 p)	Broadbridge Heath	Shoreham-by-Sea
19:45	Jordan Stallibrass 39'	Report	Jamie Taylor 36'	Stadium: Middle Road; Attendance: 89

15 March 2022	Pagham	1–1 (4–2 p)	Godalming Town	Pagham
19:45	Grant Radmore 38'	Report	James Frudd 90'	Stadium: Nyetimber Lane; Attendance: 64

3 November 2021	Mile Oak	1–1 (5–4 p)	Horsham YMCA	Mile Oak
19:45	Enzo Benn 30'	Report	Charlie Maguire 85'	Stadium: Mile Oak Recreation Ground; Attendance: 40

9 November 2021	Littlehampton Town	2–2 (4–3 p)	Bexhill United	Littlehampton
19:45	Lewis Jenkins 10'; * Rory Biggs 37'	Report	Jack Shonk	Stadium: The Sportsfield; Attendance: 110

2 November 2021	Wick	2–1	Roffey	Wick, West Sussex
19:45	David Crouch 75' 85'	Report	Hayden Neathey 89'	Stadium: Crabtree Park; Attendance: 35

30 November 2021	Saltdean United	3–0	Alfold	Saltdean
19:45	Kieron Pamment 3'; George Taggart 6'; Joseph Shelley 43'	Report		Stadium: Hill Park; Attendance: 78

=== Quarter-finals ===
22 February 2022	Newhaven	2–0	Crawley Down Gatwick	Newhaven
19:45	Lucas Franzen-Jones 15' (88)	Report		Stadium: Fort Road; Attendance: 51

22 March 2022	Shoreham	1–1 (3–4 p)	Pagham	Shoreham-by-Sea
	Ramon Santos 45'	Report	Ryan Morey 14'	Stadium: Middle Road; Attendance: 57

23 February 2022	Mile Oak	0–4	Littlehampton Town	Mile Oak
19:30		Report	Aaron Stenning 20' (o.g.); George Gaskin 34'; Lucas Pattendon 55'; Thomas Biggs 68'	Stadium: Mile Oak Recreation Ground; Attendance: 215

22 February 2022	Wick	1–1 (4–3 p)	Saltdean United	Wick
19:45	Nathan Hawker 87'	Report	Reece Hallard 60'	Stadium: Crabtree Park; Attendance: 60

=== Semi-finals ===
5 April 2022	Newhaven	3–3 (5–4 p)	Pagham	Steyning
19:30	Alfie Rogers 10' 45'; Lucas Franzen-Jones 63'	Report	Joe Clarke; Jazz Rance; Cal Chalmers	Stadium: The Shooting Field

22 March 2022	Littlehampton Town	1–1 (4–1 p)	Wick	Arundel
19:45	Lucas Pattendon 86'	Report	Ben Gray 63'	Stadium: Mill Road; Attendance: 368

=== Final ===
15 May 2022	Newhaven	0–3	Littlehampton Town	Horsham
		Report	7' 70' Gaskin; 13' Pattenden	Stadium: Campingworld Community Stadium; Attendance: 364
