= 2022–23 Southern Combination Football League =

The 2022–23 Southern Combination Football League season was the 98th in the history of the competition, which lies at levels 9, 10 and 11 (steps 5 and 6, and county feeder) of the English football league system.

The provisional club allocations for steps 5 and 6 were announced by The Football Association on 12 May.

== Premier Division ==
The Premier Division comprised 20 clubs from the previous season, 17 of which competed in the previous season

=== Team changes ===
To the Premier Division

Promoted from Division One

- Midhurst & Easebourne
- Roffey

Transferred from the Southern Counties East League

- Crowborough Athletic

From the Premier Division

Transferred to the Wessex League Premier Division

- Pagham

Promoted to the Isthmian League South East Division

- Littlehampton Town

Relegated to Division One

- East Preston

=== League table ===
Southern Combination League Premier Division
- Season: 2022–23
- Dates: 30 July 2022 – 29 April 2023
- Champions: Broadbridge Heath
- Promoted: Broadbridge Heath
- Relegated: Alfold; Roffey
- Matches: 380
- Goals: 1,288 (3.39 per match)
- Top goalscorer: Phillip Johnson (24 goals)
- Biggest home win: Newhaven 11–0 Roffey (18 February 2023)
- Biggest away win: Saltdean United 0–7 Newhaven (2 January 2023)
- Highest scoring: Newhaven 11–0 Roffey (18 February 2023)
- Longest winning run: 11 matches Crawley Down Gatwick
- Longest unbeaten run: 14 matches Broadbridge Heath
- Longest losing run: 13 matches AFC Varndeanians; Roffey
- Highest attendance: 739; Newhaven 3–2 Peacehaven & Telscombe (26 December 2022)
- Lowest attendance: 27; Lingfield 0–3 AFC Varndeanians (12 October 2022)
- Total attendance: 47,827
- Average attendance: 125.8

Pos	Team	Pld	W	D	L	GF	GA	GD	Pts	Promotion, qualification or relegation
1	Broadbridge Heath (C, P)	38	27	6	5	93	33	+60	87	Promoted to the Isthmian League
2	Crawley Down Gatwick	38	27	3	8	76	32	+44	84	Qualified for inter-step play-off
3	Newhaven	38	25	6	7	119	41	+78	81	
4	Eastbourne United	38	20	12	6	59	32	+27	72	
5	Steyning Town	38	21	8	9	78	44	+34	71	
6	Crowborough Athletic	38	21	7	10	68	44	+24	70	
7	Bexhill United	38	22	3	13	68	48	+20	69	
8	Peacehaven & Telscombe	38	21	5	12	71	42	+29	68	
9	Eastbourne Town	38	19	9	10	58	32	+26	66	
10	Hassocks	38	19	6	13	73	47	+26	63	
11	Little Common	38	18	7	13	73	53	+20	61	
12	Horsham YMCA	38	13	7	18	51	64	−13	46	
13	Midhurst & Easebourne	38	9	8	21	57	85	−28	35	
14	Lingfield	38	10	4	24	58	86	−28	34	
15	Loxwood	38	9	7	22	59	101	−42	34	
16	AFC Uckfield Town	38	10	3	25	47	83	−36	33	
17	AFC Varndeanians	38	9	6	23	53	90	−37	33	
18	Saltdean United	38	8	4	26	33	108	−75	28	
19	Alfold (R)	38	5	7	26	47	101	−54	22	Relegated to Division One
20	Roffey (R)	38	5	6	27	47	122	−75	21	Relegated to Division One

Source: scfl.org.uk
Rules for classification: 1) points; 2) goal difference; 3) number of goals scored; 4) number of matches won; 5) head-to-head results
(C) Champions; (P) Promoted; (R) Relegated

=== Inter-step play-off ===
29 April 2023	Sutton Common Rovers	2–0	Crawley Down Gatwick	Whyteleafe
15:00		Report		Stadium: Church Road; Attendance: 164

=== Results table ===
Home \ Away	UCK	VAR	ALF	BEX	BBH	CDG	CRO	EBT	EBU	HSK	HYM	LIN	LCM	LOX	MID	NEW	PAT	ROF	SDU	STT
AFC Uckfield Town		4–0	1–3	0–2	1–3	0–3	1–4	0–3	1–3	1–2	2–1	1–2	2–1	4–3	1–0	0–5	0–1	3–1	2–3	3–2
AFC Varndeanians	4–3		1–3	2–1	0–2	0–1	0–1	0–1	1–4	0–3	0–2	1–1	2–2	6–2	7–4	0–3	0–2	3–3	2–3	2–2
Alfold	0–0	0–1		0–3	1–1	0–5	1–3	1–2	0–1	0–3	1–3	2–2	0–1	2–2	1–4	1–5	2–4	7–3	3–1	3–3
Bexhill United	1–0	1–0	4–1		0–1	0–3	0–1	3–1	2–4	2–1	2–1	3–2	2–1	6–0	3–1	2–0	3–1	1–2	2–0	0–2
Broadbridge Heath	3–1	3–0	2–1	3–1		5–0	1–3	3–0	0–1	2–1	1–1	3–2	5–1	3–0	5–0	1–1	1–2	2–2	8–0	2–0
Crawley Down Gatwick	2–0	4–2	1–0	0–1	2–4		1–2	0–2	1–1	1–0	4–0	3–0	3–1	5–0	2–0	2–1	0–0	3–1	2–0	2–1
Crowborough Athletic	2–0	0–1	2–0	1–2	0–3	2–1		2–0	1–0	2–3	2–0	1–1	2–0	1–2	2–2	1–1	4–1	3–2	4–1	4–0
Eastbourne Town	1–1	5–0	3–1	1–1	1–1	1–0	0–0		2–1	0–1	2–1	4–0	2–2	4–1	1–0	0–3	1–1	4–0	2–0	0–1
Eastbourne United	2–0	2–2	2–0	1–0	2–0	0–1	1–1	1–0		1–1	3–1	3–1	1–0	2–2	2–0	1–2	0–3	4–1	2–0	1–1
Hassocks	3–0	2–0	2–0	2–0	3–3	0–1	1–2	4–1	0–0		4–0	2–2	1–2	2–0	3–4	2–2	0–0	7–0	5–1	2–3
Horsham YMCA	0–1	2–1	3–0	1–3	0–1	1–4	0–2	0–0	1–1	2–4		1–0	2–0	3–1	1–1	1–3	0–1	1–1	3–3	1–0
Lingfield	0–3	0–3	5–0	1–4	0–4	1–2	3–2	0–4	0–2	1–3	2–3		0–1	5–1	4–1	2–3	2–1	5–2	1–0	0–2
Little Common	2–1	6–1	5–1	0–0	0–1	1–2	3–2	0–1	2–1	2–0	3–0	3–2		1–1	4–1	0–3	2–1	8–2	1–1	2–0
Loxwood	3–1	3–2	1–1	2–1	2–3	1–2	1–1	0–3	2–2	0–2	4–1	3–1	2–3		0–2	1–6	0–3	3–0	3–1	1–4
Midhurst & Easebourne	2–2	2–3	3–3	1–1	0–3	1–4	3–2	1–0	1–1	5–0	0–1	0–1	2–4	1–3		2–3	3–0	0–4	0–0	1–1
Newhaven	6–1	7–0	6–1	3–0	0–1	0–1	3–2	1–1	0–0	2–0	2–2	3–1	2–1	4–2	5–0		3–2	11–0	5–0	1–4
Peacehaven & Telscombe	0–4	1–0	4–0	4–1	0–3	2–0	3–0	0–0	2–3	3–0	0–2	4–2	1–0	5–0	2–0	4–0		7–0	1–0	0–2
Roffey	4–2	0–2	1–2	2–3	0–3	0–3	0–1	0–3	0–0	1–2	2–3	0–4	2–2	3–3	1–5	0–6	3–1		1–2	0–1
Saltdean United	2–0	3–3	4–2	0–6	0–2	0–4	1–2	1–0	0–2	0–2	0–5	3–1	0–5	2–1	1–3	0–7	0–3	0–2		0–6
Steyning Town	4–0	2–1	3–2	3–0	4–1	1–1	1–1	0–2	0–1	1–0	3–1	5–1	1–1	1–3	4–1	2–1	1–1	2–1	5–0	

Source: SCFL Fixture Grid
Legend: Blue = home team win; Yellow = draw; Red = away team win.

=== Results by matchday ===
Matchday	1	2	3	4	5	6	7	8	9	10	11	12	13	14	15	16	17	18	19	20	21	22	23	24	25	26	27	28	29	30	31	32	33	34	35	36	37	38
AFC Uckfield Town	W	D	L	L	W	W	L	L	L	W	W	L	L	L	D	W	L	L	L	W	L	L	W	L	L	L	L	W	L	L	L	W	L	L	W	D	L	L
AFC Varndeanians	L	W	D	L	D	W	L	L	L	L	W	L	W	W	W	L	D	L	D	L	D	W	D	L	W	L	L	L	L	L	L	L	L	L	L	L	L	L
Alfold	D	L	L	L	L	L	L	L	L	W	L	L	L	L	L	W	L	L	W	L	D	L	W	L	D	L	D	L	L	D	L	L	W	L	L	D	D	L
Bexhill United	D	W	W	L	L	W	W	L	L	W	W	W	L	W	L	W	L	W	L	W	D	L	W	L	W	W	W	L	W	W	W	L	W	W	L	W	D	W
Broadbridge Heath	W	W	L	W	W	W	W	D	D	W	W	W	W	W	W	W	L	L	W	W	L	D	D	W	W	W	W	W	W	W	D	D	W	W	W	L	W	W
Crawley Down Gatwick	W	W	L	L	L	W	W	W	W	W	W	L	W	W	W	W	W	W	W	W	W	W	W	L	L	W	W	L	L	D	W	W	D	W	W	D	W	W
Crowborough Athletic	W	W	D	L	W	W	L	D	D	D	W	L	W	L	L	D	W	D	W	W	L	W	W	W	W	L	W	W	W	L	W	W	W	L	D	W	W	W
Eastbourne Town	W	D	L	W	D	D	L	L	D	W	W	L	L	W	D	W	W	W	W	W	D	W	L	W	W	W	L	W	W	W	W	D	D	W	D	L	L	L
Eastbourne United Association	W	L	W	W	W	D	L	W	W	L	W	W	D	D	W	L	W	D	D	L	W	W	W	W	W	D	D	D	L	W	D	W	D	W	W	W	D	D
Hassocks	L	L	W	W	W	L	L	W	D	W	W	W	D	L	W	D	W	L	L	W	L	W	W	W	L	D	W	W	W	W	D	D	L	L	L	L	W	W
Horsham YMCA	L	W	W	W	W	W	L	L	L	D	L	W	L	L	W	L	L	W	D	D	L	W	D	D	L	L	D	L	L	L	L	D	W	L	W	L	W	W
Lingfield	D	W	L	L	L	L	W	L	D	W	L	L	L	L	W	W	L	L	D	L	W	L	W	D	L	W	W	L	L	L	W	L	L	L	L	L	L	L
Little Common	L	D	D	D	W	L	W	L	W	D	L	W	L	W	W	W	L	L	L	W	L	W	W	W	L	W	W	W	W	L	L	W	D	L	W	D	D	W
Loxwood	L	W	D	W	L	L	L	W	L	L	L	L	L	L	L	D	D	D	L	D	W	L	L	L	L	W	D	L	L	L	L	W	L	W	W	W	D	L
Midhurst & Easebourne	D	W	W	L	W	L	W	W	L	W	W	L	L	L	L	W	D	L	W	L	L	L	D	D	L	L	D	L	L	L	L	L	D	L	L	L	D	D
Newhaven	L	L	W	W	W	W	W	W	W	D	L	W	W	W	W	D	W	L	D	W	W	L	W	W	L	W	W	W	W	W	W	D	D	W	D	L	L	W
Roffey	L	L	L	L	L	L	L	L	L	L	L	L	L	D	L	L	L	L	D	L	D	D	L	L	D	L	L	L	L	W	L	W	W	W	D	L	W	L
Peacehaven & Telscombe	W	W	W	W	L	D	W	L	L	L	L	W	D	W	W	W	W	W	L	W	L	W	L	W	W	D	L	W	W	W	L	W	D	D	W	L	L	W
Saltdean United	L	L	L	L	L	W	W	W	L	L	D	L	W	W	L	L	L	L	L	D	L	L	D	L	L	L	L	L	L	L	L	L	W	L	W	W	L	D
Steyning Town	W	L	D	L	L	W	W	W	W	W	W	W	W	D	L	L	L	D	W	W	W	W	L	W	D	W	L	W	W	D	W	W	L	D	W	W	D	D

Source: The FA Full-Time SCFL Premier Division
W = Win; D = Draw; L = Loss

=== Top scorers ===
Rank	Player	Club	Goals
1	Philip Johnson	Hassocks	24
2	Jack Langford	Steyning Town (previously Bexhill United)	22
3	Alfie Rogers	Newhaven	21
4	Lucas Franzen-Jones	Newhaven	20
5	Sam Clements	Crawley Down Gatwick	18
6	Evan Archibald	Bexhill United	17
6	Liam Benson	Hassocks	17
6	Lee Robinson	Newhaven	17
9	Lewis Hole	Little Common	16
9	Thomas Tolfrey	Horsham YMCA	16

=== Stadia and locations ===
Map showing the location of teams in the Premier Division

Team	Location	Stadium	Capacity
AFC Varndeanians	Brighton (Withdean)	Withdean Stadium (groundshare with Brighton Electricity)	8,850
AFC Uckfield Town	Framfield	The Oaks	600
Alfold	Alfold Crossways	Alfold Recreation Ground	1,000
Bexhill United	Bexhill-on-Sea	The Polegrove	1,000
Broadbridge Heath	Broadbridge Heath	Broadbridge Heath Leisure Centre	1,000
Crawley Down Gatwick	Crawley Down	The Haven Centre	1,000
Crowborough Athletic	Crowborough	Crowborough Community Stadium	2,000
Eastbourne Town	Eastbourne	The Saffrons	4,500
Eastbourne United Association	Eastbourne	The Oval	1,200
Hassocks	Hassocks	The Beacon	1,000
Horsham YMCA	Horsham	Gorings Mead	1,500
Lingfield	Lingfield	The Sports Pavilion	2,000
Little Common	Bexhill-on-Sea (Little Common)	Little Common Recreation Ground	1,200
Loxwood	Loxwood	Plaistow Road	1,000
Midhurst & Easebourne	Easebourne	Rotherfield	1,000
Newhaven	Newhaven	The Trafalgar Ground	3,000
Peacehaven & Telscombe	Peacehaven	The Sports Park	3,000
Roffey	Horsham (Roffey)	Bartholomew Way	1,000
Saltdean United	Brighton (Saltdean)	Hill Park	1,000
Steyning Town	Steyning	The Shooting Field	2,000

== Division One ==
Division One was reduced to 17 clubs from 18, 15 of which competed from the previous season

=== Team changes ===
To Division One

Transferred from Southern Counties East League

- Chessington & Hook United

Relegated from the Premier Division

- East Preston

From Division One

Promoted to the Premier Division

- Midhurst & Easebourne
- Roffey

Relegated to Division Two

- Storrington

=== League table ===
Southern Combination League Division One
- Season: 2022–23
- Dates: 7 August 2022 – 7 May 2023
- Champions: Shoreham
- Promoted: Shoreham; Epsom & Ewell
- Relegated: Forest Row; Montpelier Villa; Hailsham Town
- Matches: 272
- Goals: 852 (3.13 per match)
- Top goalscorer: Harry Heath (24 goals)
- Biggest home win: Shoreham 8–2 Billingshurst (8 October 2022)
- Biggest away win: Montpelier Villa 0–5 Chessington & Hook United (6 August 2022)
- Highest scoring: Arundel 7–4 Chessington & Hook United (13 April 2023)
- Longest winning run: 8 matches Epsom & Ewell
- Longest unbeaten run: 23 matches Shoreham
- Longest losing run: 9 matches Forest Row
- Highest attendance: 512; Shoreham 1–0 Montpelier Villa (22 April 2023)
- Lowest attendance: 11; Oakwood 0–1 Dorking Wanderers B (13 September 2022)
- Total attendance: 23,537
- Average attendance: 86.5

Pos	Team	Pld	W	D	L	GF	GA	GD	Pts	Promotion, qualification or relegation
1	Shoreham (C, P)	32	21	8	3	79	31	+48	71	Promoted to the Premier Division
2	Epsom & Ewell (O, P)	32	20	5	7	68	41	+27	65	Qualified for the play-offs, then promoted to Combined Counties League Premier Division South
3	Dorking Wanderers B	32	19	6	7	59	31	+28	63	Ineligible for promotion (Note: Dorking Wanderers B are not permitted to take part in the play-offs as reserve sides cannot compete above Step 6.)
4	Wick	32	19	5	8	59	39	+20	62	Qualified for the play-offs
5	Godalming Town	32	18	7	7	62	34	+28	61	Qualified for the play-offs
6	Selsey	32	16	8	8	57	37	+20	56	Qualified for the play-offs
7	Arundel	32	14	9	9	71	51	+20	51	
8	Billingshurst	32	12	5	15	52	71	−19	41	
9	Seaford Town	32	11	7	14	43	47	−4	40	
10	Chessington & Hook United	32	9	8	15	47	48	−1	35	
11	Worthing United	32	10	5	17	39	51	−12	35	
12	Mile Oak	32	8	10	14	40	59	−19	34	
13	East Preston	32	9	5	18	38	60	−22	32	
14	Oakwood	32	9	5	18	36	49	−13	31 (Note: Deducted 1 point.)	
15	Montpelier Villa	32	8	5	19	32	67	−35	29	Reprieved from relegation
16	Forest Row	32	8	5	19	39	76	−37	29	Reprieved from relegation
17	Hailsham Town (R)	32	6	7	19	31	60	−29	25	Relegated to Division Two

Source: The FA Full-Time Division 1 Table
Rules for classification: 1) points; 2) goal difference; 3) number of goals scored; 4) number of matches won; 5) head-to-head results
(C) Champions; (O) Play-off winners; (P) Promoted; (R) Relegated

=== Play-offs ===
Semi-finals
2	Epsom & Ewell	0 (6)
6	Selsey	0 (5)
4	Wick	2
5	Godalming Town	1

Final
2	Epsom & Ewell	2
4	Wick	1

==== Semi-finals ====
29 April 2023	Epsom & Ewell	0–0 (6–5 p)	Selsey	Leatherhead
15:00 GMT		Report		Stadium: Fetcham Grove

29 April 2023	Wick	2–1	Godalming Town	Littlehampton (Wick)
15:00 GMT		Report		Stadium: Crabtree Park

==== Final ====
7 May 2023	Epsom & Ewell	2–1	Wick	Leatherhead
15:00 GMT	31' 80' Jaevon Dyer		64' Sam Conolly	Stadium: Fetcham Grove; Attendance: 384

=== Results table ===
Home \ Away	ARU	BIL	CHU	DOR	EPR	EPS	FOR	GOD	HAI	MOK	MON	OAK	SEA	SEL	SHO	WIC	WOR
Arundel		3–0	7–4	1–0	7–2	5–1	5–0	1–4	2–1	1–1	2–4	3–1	0–1	3–0	1–1	3–2	4–3
Billingshurst	2–1		2–2	2–1	0–2	1–3	3–3	3–0	3–1	1–0	4–0	1–1	1–2	2–1	1–1	4–3	2–5
Chessington & Hook United	0–0	4–1		1–1	1–1	1–2	1–1	1–2	4–0	4–0	1–1	1–0	0–2	0–1	1–3	0–2	2–2
Dorking Wanderers B	4–2	1–2	2–0		3–0	3–0	3–0	3–1	2–1	1–1	5–1	3–2	2–0	1–3	2–1	2–2	1–0
East Preston	1–1	1–2	2–1	1–2		1–3	2–1	0–1	0–0	1–2	1–0	1–2	1–0	2–2	2–4	2–2	2–1
Epsom & Ewell	3–2	3–1	1–3	1–0	1–2		5–2	2–2	2–0	1–1	2–1	1–2	2–0	3–2	1–1	6–1	1–3
Forest Row	1–3	1–3	0–1	1–4	2–1	0–2		0–5	2–2	3–1	0–3	2–1	4–1	0–3	0–2	2–3	1–2
Godalming Town	2–2	5–1	0–2	2–1	5–1	1–3	4–1		0–0	5–1	3–0	1–0	2–2	1–1	1–2	0–1	1–0
Hailsham Town	1–2	3–2	2–1	0–2	0–2	2–4	1–1	0–1		3–2	1–0	1–0	1–2	0–1	1–6	2–2	1–2
Mile Oak	3–2	1–1	2–0	1–1	0–2	0–0	3–0	2–2	3–2		2–0	2–3	3–0	2–2	1–5	0–4	1–0
Montpelier Villa	1–1	2–0	0–5	1–2	2–1	0–0	3–3	0–3	2–1	3–1		0–3	1–4	0–4	0–4	1–2	2–1
Oakwood	2–1	1–2	4–1	0–1	1–2	0–5	0–2	0–1	1–1	1–1	1–1		1–3	0–2	1–3	0–1	2–0
Seaford Town	1–2	4–1	2–2	2–2	3–1	1–2	1–2	0–2	1–2	0–0	4–0	0–0		2–1	3–1	0–2	0–1
Selsey	1–1	4–1	0–2	0–2	3–1	2–3	3–1	1–2	5–0	3–1	2–1	1–2	1–1		1–1	1–1	1–1
Shoreham	1–1	8–2	2–1	2–0	3–0	1–0	3–0	1–1	1–1	3–2	1–0	1–0	3–0	1–2		3–0	1–1
Wick	1–0	2–0	2–0	0–0	3–0	0–2	2–0	0–1	1–0	3–0	3–0	4–2	3–0	0–1	2–6		2–0
Worthing United	2–2	1–2	1–0	0–4	1–3	0–3	1–2	2–1	1–0	2–0	0–2	0–2	1–1	0–1	2–3	1–3	

Source: The FA Full-Time SCFL Division One
Legend: Blue = home team win; Yellow = draw; Red = away team win.

=== Results by matchday ===
Matchday	1	2	3	4	5	6	7	8	9	10	11	12	13	14	15	16	17	18	19	20	21	22	23	24	25	26	27	28	29	30	31	32
Arundel	W	L	D	L	W	W	W	D	L	W	W	D	D	W	L	W	D	W	D	D	L	L	L	L	W	W	W	W	L	D	D	W
Billingshurst	L	W	W	D	W	L	L	L	L	L	W	L	D	L	W	W	W	L	D	W	L	D	W	W	D	W	W	L	L	L	L	L
Chessington & Hook United	W	L	W	W	D	L	W	L	L	D	L	L	D	W	W	L	L	D	L	L	D	D	W	D	L	D	W	L	L	L	D	W
Dorking Wanderers B	W	L	L	W	D	D	W	W	W	L	W	L	L	W	W	W	W	D	L	W	W	D	W	W	L	W	W	W	D	W	W	D
East Preston	D	W	W	W	L	L	W	L	L	L	D	L	L	L	D	L	L	W	W	W	W	D	L	D	L	W	L	L	L	D	L	L
Epsom & Ewell	L	W	W	W	W	W	W	W	W	D	W	W	W	L	W	D	L	L	L	W	W	L	W	W	D	W	L	D	D	W	W	W
Forest Row	W	L	L	L	L	L	L	L	L	L	D	L	D	L	D	L	W	W	L	W	L	L	W	W	D	L	L	D	W	L	W	L
Godalming Town	W	W	D	W	W	L	L	L	W	W	L	W	D	D	W	W	W	D	W	D	W	L	D	W	D	W	W	L	W	L	W	W
Hailsham Town	D	L	L	D	L	L	W	W	L	W	D	L	L	D	L	W	W	W	L	L	L	D	L	D	D	L	L	L	L	L	L	L
Mile Oak	L	W	L	W	L	W	L	L	W	D	L	D	D	W	L	D	D	D	L	W	W	L	L	W	D	L	D	L	D	L	L	D
Montpelier Villa	L	L	L	L	L	L	L	D	L	D	W	D	L	D	L	W	W	L	W	L	L	L	L	W	L	L	L	L	W	W	W	L
Oakwood	L	L	D	L	L	L	W	W	D	L	W	L	W	L	D	L	L	D	L	W	L	D	L	W	L	W	W	W	L	L	L	L
Seaford Town	L	L	D	D	D	L	W	W	D	L	L	L	L	D	L	L	L	D	L	W	L	W	W	L	L	D	W	W	W	W	W	W
Selsey	L	W	W	W	W	W	W	W	D	L	D	D	W	L	D	D	L	W	D	L	L	W	W	L	W	W	W	W	D	L	D	W
Shoreham	W	W	D	D	W	W	D	W	W	W	W	W	D	D	W	W	W	W	W	W	W	D	D	L	W	L	W	W	D	L	W	W
Wick	W	W	W	W	W	L	L	L	W	W	W	W	W	D	L	W	D	W	L	L	D	L	W	W	W	W	D	L	D	W	W	W
Worthing United	L	L	L	D	W	W	W	D	L	D	L	D	L	W	L	D	L	L	W	L	L	W	L	L	W	W	L	L	L	L	W	L

Source: The FA Full-Time SCFL Division One
W = Win; D = Draw; L = Loss

=== Top scorers ===
Rank	Player	Club	Goals
1	Harry Heath	Shoreham	24
2	Shane Brazil	Selsey	19
3	Harry Russell	Arundel	14
4	Marcus Richmond	Shoreham	13
5	Zachary Harris	Wick	12
6	David Crouch	Wick	11
6	Ramon Santos	Montpelier Villa	11
8	Ben Aubrey	Dorking Wanderers B	10
8	Athan Smith-Joseph	Epsom & Ewell	10
8	Jaevon Dyer	Epsom & Ewell	10

=== Stadia and locations ===
Map showing the location of teams in Division 1

Team	Location	Stadium	Capacity
Arundel	Arundel	Mill Road	2,200
Billingshurst	Billingshurst	Jubilee Fields	—
Chessington & Hook United	Chessington	Chalky Lane	3,000
Dorking Wanderers B	Dorking	Meadowbank	3,000
East Preston	Littlehampton (East Preston)	The Lashmar	1,000
Epsom & Ewell	Leatherhead	Fetcham Grove (groundshare with Leatherhead)	3,400
Forest Row	Crawley (Three Bridges)	Tinsley Lane (groundshare with Oakwood)	—
Godalming Town	Godalming	Bill Kyte Stadium	3,000
Hailsham Town	Hailsham	The Beaconsfield	2,000
Mile Oak	Brighton (Mile Oak)	Mile Oak Recreation Ground	—
Montpelier Villa	Lancing	Culver Road (groundshare with Lancing)	1,500
Oakwood	Crawley (Three Bridges)	Tinsley Lane	—
Seaford Town	Seaford	The Crouch	—
Selsey	Selsey	Bunn Leisure Stadium	—
Shoreham	Shoreham-by-Sea	Middle Road	2,000
Wick	Littlehampton (Wick)	Crabtree Park	2,000
Worthing United	Worthing (Broadwater)	The Robert Albon Memorial Ground	1,504

== Division Two ==
Division Two remained at 14 teams.

=== Team changes ===
To Division Two

Promoted from West Sussex Football League

- Capel

Relegated from Division One

- Storrington

From Division Two

Left the league

- Littlehampton United

Southern Combination League Division Two
- Season: 2022–23
- Dates: 20 August 2022 – 1 May 2023
- Champions: Jarvis Brook
- Promoted: Copthorne
- Matches: 182
- Goals: 789 (4.34 per match)
- Top goalscorer: Chris Darwin (27 goals)
- Biggest home win: St Francis Rangers 7–0 Brighton Electricity (20 August 2022)
- Biggest away win: Rustington 0–7 Copthorne (24 September 2022)
- Highest scoring: Worthing Town 4–9 St Francis Rangers (10 December 2022)
- Longest winning run: 13 matches Jarvis Brook
- Longest unbeaten run: 14 matches Jarvis Brook
- Longest losing run: 10 matches Upper Beeding
- Highest attendance: 182; Worthing Town 4–4 Rustington (29 August 2022)
- Lowest attendance: 10; Brighton Electricity 0–0 Worthing Town (29 October 2022)
- Total attendance: 9,971
- Average attendance: 58.3

Promotion from this division depended on ground grading as well as league position.

=== League table ===
Pos	Team	Pld	W	D	L	GF	GA	GD	Pts	Promotion or relegation
1	Jarvis Brook (C)	26	21	2	3	80	18	+62	65	
2	Copthorne (P)	26	16	4	6	73	44	+29	52	Promoted to Division One
3	Capel	26	16	2	8	88	53	+35	50	
4	Storrington	26	14	5	7	72	36	+36	47	
5	Bosham	26	14	4	8	58	50	+8	46	
6	Southwater	26	13	5	8	57	51	+6	44	
7	Ferring	26	12	5	9	52	48	+4	41	
8	St Francis Rangers	26	10	6	10	61	48	+13	36	
9	Charlwood	26	11	2	13	53	49	+4	35	Resigned from League
10	Rustington	26	8	4	14	42	75	−33	28	
11	Rottingdean Village	26	8	2	16	37	58	−21	26	
12	Worthing Town	26	7	4	15	57	86	−29	25	
13	Upper Beeding	26	4	5	17	32	82	−50	17	
14	Brighton Electricity	26	2	2	22	27	91	−64	8	

Source: The FA Full-Time SCFL Division 2 Table
Rules for classification: 1) points; 2) goal difference; 3) number of goals scored.
(C) Champions; (P) Promoted

=== Results table ===
Home \ Away	BOS	BRE	CAP	CHA	COP	FER	JAR	ROT	RUS	SOU	STF	STO	UBD	WOR
Bosham		5–3	1–4	3–0	2–1	6–2	2–1	5–1	2–1	2–2	1–1	1–1	3–1	2–3
Brighton Electricity	0–1		1–6	H/W	2–4	2–4	0–4	0–2	5–0	0–3	0–4	0–5	0–1	0–0
Capel	5–2	3–0		0–1	2–3	7–3	3–2	0–0	8–1	5–1	5–4	2–5	4–4	8–2
Charlwood	1–3	2–0	1–5		3–1	0–2	0–1	3–2	8–0	2–2	0–2	0–6	4–0	4–1
Copthorne	5–0	3–2	1–3	3–2		1–1	0–3	3–0	3–2	5–0	2–1	1–1	1–1	6–1
Ferring	3–1	3–2	1–2	2–1	3–4		0–1	4–0	3–0	2–3	4–4	1–0	2–0	1–2
Jarvis Brook	2–0	7–2	3–2	5–0	7–1	0–0		7–0	1–4	4–0	5–0	3–0	7–3	4–0
Rottingdean Village	0–4	7–1	3–0	0–3	2–1	0–1	0–0		1–2	1–2	0–3	1–3	1–2	3–0
Rustington	1–2	2–1	1–5	1–1	0–7	5–2	1–0	4–1		1–1	0–0	1–4	2–3	4–3
Southwater	1–1	3–2	2–3	1–0	2–4	1–2	0–1	2–1	4–2		1–1	5–2	8–1	5–3
St Francis Rangers	6–0	7–0	4–0	2–1	1–2	2–4	0–1	1–2	1–4	1–3		1–5	2–2	2–1
Storrington	2–6	6–0	4–0	2–3	1–1	3–1	2–3	4–0	0–1	3–0	0–0		3–1	6–1
Upper Beeding	0–3	3–3	0–4	1–5	0–6	0–0	0–1	2–5	2–1	1–2	1–2	2–3		0–6
Worthing Town	3–0	6–1	3–2	4–7	2–4	1–1	1–4	1–4	4–4	1–3	4–9	1–1	3–1	

Source: SCFL Fixtures and Results
Legend: Blue = home team win; Yellow = draw; Red = away team win.

=== Results by matchday ===
Matchday	1	2	3	4	5	6	7	8	9	10	11	12	13	14	15	16	17	18	19	20	21	22	23	24	25	26
Bosham	D	L	L	D	L	W	L	W	W	W	L	W	W	L	L	L	W	W	W	W	W	W	D	W	D	D
Brighton Electricity	L	L	L	L	L	L	D	L	L	D	L	L	W	L	L	L	L	L	L	W	L	L	L	L	L	L
Capel	D	W	W	L	W	W	W	W	D	L	W	W	L	W	W	L	L	W	W	L	W	L	W	L	W	W
Charlwood	W	L	W	W	W	D	W	L	W	W	L	D	W	L	L	L	L	L	L	L	W	L	W	L	L	W
Copthorne	W	W	L	L	L	W	L	W	L	D	W	W	L	W	W	W	W	W	W	W	W	D	W	W	D	D
Ferring	L	W	W	W	D	D	L	L	L	W	W	W	W	W	L	L	W	D	W	L	L	W	L	D	D	W
Jarvis Brook	W	W	W	L	W	W	W	W	W	W	W	W	W	W	W	W	W	D	L	W	W	W	D	L	L	W
Rottingdean Village	D	W	W	W	W	L	L	L	L	L	L	W	L	W	L	W	L	L	L	L	L	W	D	L	L	L
Rustington	W	W	D	W	L	L	W	D	W	L	L	L	D	L	W	W	L	D	L	W	L	L	W	L	L	L
Southwater	D	W	L	D	W	D	W	D	W	L	W	L	L	L	L	W	W	W	W	W	W	W	W	L	L	W
St Francis Rangers	W	L	L	D	W	L	W	D	D	W	L	W	L	W	L	W	L	W	W	L	W	D	W	L	L	D
Storrington	L	W	W	D	W	W	L	D	D	D	L	L	L	W	W	W	D	W	W	W	W	W	W	W	W	L
Upper Beeding	L	L	L	L	L	L	D	D	D	L	W	L	L	L	L	L	L	L	L	L	L	W	W	D	D	W
Worthing Town	L	L	D	W	L	D	L	D	L	D	W	L	L	L	L	L	W	L	W	W	L	L	W	L	W	L

Source: The FA Full-Time SCFL Division 2
W = Win; D = Draw; L = Loss

=== Top scorers ===
Rank	Player	Club	Goals
1	Chris Darwin	Rustington	27
2	Stephen Smith	Jarvis Brook	24
3	Lewis Rustell	Bosham	23
4	Toby Funnell	Copthorne	22
4	Lloyd Jermy	Capel	22
6	Ben Lewis	Southwater	20
6	Jordan Suter	Storrington	20
8	Sean Culley	Storrington (previously Worthing Town)	18
9	Daniel Sullivan	Copthorne	17
10	George Cumming	Capel	15

=== Stadia and locations ===
Map showing the location of teams in Division 2

Team	Location	Stadium	Capacity
Bosham	Bosham	Walton Lane	—
Brighton Electricity	Brighton (Withdean)	Withdean Stadium (groundshare with AFC Varndeanians)	8,850
Capel	Capel	Newdigate Road	—
Charlwood	Charlwood	Glovers Road	—
Copthorne	Copthorne	Camping World Community Stadium (groundshare with Horsham)	1,300
Ferring	Ferring	The Glebelands	—
Jarvis Brook	Crowborough	Limekiln	—
Rottingdean Village	Brighton (Rottingdean)	Rottingdean Sports Centre	—
Rustington	Rustington	Rustington Recreation Ground	—
Southwater	Southwater	Southwater Sports Club	—
St Francis Rangers	Haywards Heath	Colwell Ground	1000
Storrington	Storrington	The Recreation Ground, Storrington	—
Upper Beeding	Upper Beeding	Memorial Playing Field	—
Worthing Town	Worthing	Palatine Park	—

== Peter Bentley League Challenge Cup ==
Source: 2022–23 Peter Bentley League Cup

=== First round ===
23 August 2022	Arundel	2–4	Montpelier Villa	Arundel
19:45	Stephen Herbert 11'; Liam Brady 87'	Report	21' 48' 57' 69'	Stadium: Mill Road

9 August 2022	Billingshurst	1–4	Chessington & Hook United	Billingshurst
19:45	Nick Tilley 58'	Report		Stadium: Jubilee Fields; Attendance: 72

9 August 2022	Hailsham Town	3–0	Mile Oak	Hailsham
19:30	Connor Martin 49' 80'; Connor Townsend 88'	Report		Stadium: Beaconsfield; Attendance: 113

9 August 2022	Oakwood	1–2	Forest Row	Crawley
19:45	Ashley Hollom 70'	Report	Ross Jones 32' 72'	Stadium: Oakwood Sports and Social Club; Attendance: 50

9 August 2022	Selsey	2–3	Wick	Selsey
19:45	Evan Harris 25'; Corey Burns 57'	Report	Ryan Barratt 49'; David Crouch 62'; Joshua Irish 85'	Stadium: High Street Ground

=== Second round ===
6 September 2022	AFC Uckfield Town	1–3	Bexhill United	Uckfield
19:30	Omar Abbas	Report	Jamie Thoroughgood 28' 64'; Hayden Beaconsfield 72'	Stadium: The Oaks; Attendance: 63

6 September 2022	Alfold	0–5	Horsham YMCA	Alfold
19:45		Report	Joshua Tuck 13'; Harry Law 40'; Joshua Neathey 66'; Stanley Berry 72'	Stadium: Alfold Recreation Ground; Attendance: 51

6 September 2022	Broadbridge Heath	4–0	Midhurst & Easebourne	Broadbridge Heath
19:45	Ben Cooksley 21'; Lewis Croal 24' 68'; Mason Doughty 50'	Report		Stadium: Countryside Stadium; Attendance: 40

6 September 2022	Chessington & Hook United	1–4	Steyning Town	Chessington
19:45	Warren Lyn	Report	Dominic Johnson-Fisher 5' 65'; Nathan Da Costa 47'; Josh Bradley 90+4'	Stadium: Chalky Lane; Attendance: 93

6 September 2022	Crawley Down Gatwick	2–3	Epsom & Ewell	Crawley Down
19:30	Michael Wood 59'; Rhys White 80'	Report	Bradley Peters 5'; Josh Owen 47'; Ricardo Fernandes 65'	Stadium: Haven Field; Attendance: 53

6 September 2022	Eastbourne United	6–0	Seaford Town	Eastbourne
19:45	Max Thompson 8' 20' 45'; Arron Hopkinson 26'; Jack Samways 81'	Report		Stadium: The Oval; Attendance: 85

6 September 2022	Forest Row	0–5	Lingfield	Crawley
19:45		Report	Richard Wetton; David Vetterlein; Cameron Dobell	Stadium: Oakwood Sports and Social Club; Attendance: 42

6 September 2022	Godalming Town	0-1	Dorking Wanderers Reserves	Godalming
19:45		Report	Jack Saunders 37'	Stadium: The Bill Kyte Stadium; Attendance: 52

6 September 2022	Hailsham Town	2–3	Crowborough Athletic	Hailsham
19:45	George Whitley 34'; Kane Edwards 75'	Report	Dilan Nlendi 23' 54'; Harry London 31'	Stadium: The Beaconsfield; Attendance: 164

6 September 2022	Hassocks	0–2	AFC Varndeanians	Hassocks
19:45		Report	Alexander Rainford 46'; Finley Bigg 54'	Stadium: The Beacon; Attendance: 148

6 September 2022	Little Common	1–5	Newhaven	Bexhill-on-Sea (Little Common)
19:30	James Miriam-Batchelor 90'	Report	Lucas Franzen-Jones 7' 11' 40'; Tom Underwood 16'	Stadium: Little Common Recreation Ground; Attendance: 86

6 September 2022	Loxwood	3–0	Roffey	Loxwood
19:45	Devon Fender 10' 35' 75'	Report		Stadium: Plaistow Road; Attendance: 53

6 September 2022	Peacehaven & Telscombe	7–1	Eastbourne Town	Peacehaven
19:45	Max Hollobone 14'; Callum Edwards 28' 40' 69'; Robin Deen 43'; Curtis Ford 60'; Harry Docherty 80'	Report	Tyler Capon	Stadium: Centenary Park; Attendance: 188

6 September 2022	Saltdean United	4–1	Shoreham	Saltdean
19:45	Lucas Tyrell 21'; Lewis Heasman 60' 85'	Report		Stadium: Hill Park; Attendance: 84

6 September 2022	Worthing United	2–2 (4–1 p)	Preston	Worthing
19:45	Billy White 5'; Bradley Hunt 45+2'	Report	Alfie Moss 21'; Sean Culley 73'	Stadium: Robert Albon Memorial Ground; Attendance: 64

6 September 2022	Wick	3–0	Montpelier Villa	Wick, West Sussex
19:45	James Thurgar 6'; Zachary Matthew Harris 63'; Ryan Barratt 83'	Report		Stadium: Crabtree Park; Attendance: 26

=== Third round ===
3 October 2022	AFC Varndeanians	1–4	Loxwood	Brighton
20:00	11' Alexander Rainford	Report	55' 75' Clyde Jacques; 65' Devon Fender; 85' Jay Popham	Stadium: Withdean Stadium; Attendance: 55

4 October 2022	Eastbourne United	3–0	Wick	Eastbourne
19:45	3' Mason Creese; 10' Max Thompson; 45+1' Alfie Headland	Report		Stadium: The Oval; Attendance: 85

4 October 2022	Epsom & Ewell	2–4	Broadbridge Heath	Leatherhead
19:30	18' Athan Smith-Joseph; 85' Gideo Acheampong	Report	4' Jack Frankland; 65' Kyle Sim; 68' Lewis Croal; 71' Ben Cooksley	Stadium: Fetcham Grove; Attendance: 62

4 October 2022	Horsham YMCA	1–3	Dorking Wanderers B	Horsham
19:30	41' Stanley Berry	Report	10' Conan Torpey; 41' Ben Aubrey; 82' Sekou Toure	Stadium: Gorings Mead; Attendance: 74

4 October 2022	Lingfield	0–4	Crowborough Athletic	Lingfield, Surrey
19:45		Report	41' 70' Joao Andrade; 62' Harry London; 74' Lucas Murrain	Stadium: Godstone Road; Attendance: 52

18 October 2022	Newhaven	1–1 (3–2 p)	Bexhill United	Newhaven
19:45		Report		Stadium: Fort Road

18 October 2022	Saltdean United	0–6	Peacehaven & Telscombe	Saltdean
19:45		Report		Stadium: Hill Park

4 October 2022	Steyning Town	4–1	Worthing United	Steyning
19:45	2' Josh Bradley; 10' Nathan Da Costa; 82' 90+2' Dominic Johnson-Fisher	Report	30' Ryan Warr	Stadium: The Shooting Field; Attendance: 82

=== Quarter-final ===
14 February 2023	Broadbridge Heath	1–2	Newhaven	Broadbridge Heath
19:45	9' Louis Evans	Report	51' Charlie Bennett; 61' Jack Meeres	Stadium: Countryside Stadium

28 February 2023	Crowborough Athletic	1–0	Steyning Town	Crowborough
19:30	34' Harry Forster	Report		Stadium: Alderbrook

21 February 2023	Loxwood	2–0	Dorking Wanderers B	Loxwood
19:45	10' Charley Gibson; 90' Zain Beg	Report		Stadium: Plaistow Road

14 February 2023	Peacehaven & Telscombe	2–1	Eastbourne United	Peacehaven
19:45	67' Ross Barclay; 88' Callum Edwards	Report	24' Ryan McBride	Stadium: Centenary Park

=== Semi-final ===
21 March 2023	Loxwood	0–2	Newhaven	Steyning
19:45		Report	6' Ian Robinson; 17' Jack Meeres	Stadium: The Shooting Field; Attendance: 116; Referee: Daniel Jeffery

22 March 2023	Peacehaven & Telscombe	0–2	Crowborough Athletic	Newhaven
19:45		Report	62' Jacob Lambert; 90+9' Harry Forster	Stadium: Fort Road; Attendance: 142; Referee: David Spain

=== Final ===
1 May 2023	Newhaven	2–1	Crowborough Athletic	Hassocks
13:00	60' Lukas Franzen-Jones; 75' Charlie Bennett	Report	90+4'	Stadium: The Beacon; Attendance: 476; Referee: Greig Walker
