= 2015–16 Southern Combination Football League =

The 2015–16 Southern Combination Football League season was the 91st in the history of the competition (the first since it changed name from the Sussex County Football League), a football league in England. This is also the first season in which all divisions were renamed after league restructuring.

== Premier Division ==
Southern Combination Premier Division
- Season: 2015–16
- Champions: Horsham
- Promoted: Horsham
- Relegated: East Preston; St Francis Rangers
- Matches: 380
- Goals: 1,585 (4.17 per match)

The Premier Division featured 16 clubs which competed in the Sussex County League Division One last season, along with four new clubs:

- A.F.C. Uckfield Town, promoted from the old Division Two
- Horsham, relegated from the Isthmian League
- Wick & Barnham United, promoted from the old Division Two
- Worthing United, promoted from the old Division Two

Six clubs have applied for promotion to Step 4: Eastbourne Town, Horsham, Horsham YMCA, Lancing, Loxwood and Newhaven.

=== League table ===
Pos	Team	Pld	W	D	L	GF	GA	GD	Pts	Promotion or relegation
1	Horsham	38	31	4	3	131	22	+109	97	Promoted to the Isthmian League Division One South
2	Eastbourne Town	38	27	5	6	107	42	+65	86	
3	Newhaven	38	25	3	10	120	39	+81	78	
4	Lancing	38	24	5	9	98	46	+52	77	
5	Chichester City	38	23	5	10	99	46	+53	74	
6	Pagham	38	23	4	11	94	49	+45	73	
7	Horsham YMCA	38	22	5	11	105	62	+43	71	
8	Loxwood	38	22	5	11	95	60	+35	71	
9	Broadbridge Heath	38	19	6	13	75	57	+18	63	
10	Eastbourne United	38	19	6	13	81	72	+9	63	
11	Littlehampton Town	38	19	3	16	103	76	+27	60	
12	Arundel	38	16	8	14	88	68	+20	56	
13	Hassocks	38	13	9	16	59	66	−7	47 (Note: Hassocks were deducted one point for fielding an ineligible player.)	
14	Worthing United	38	12	6	20	68	83	−15	42	
15	AFC Uckfield Town	38	8	9	21	62	91	−29	33	
16	Wick & Barnham United	38	10	2	26	55	105	−50	32	
17	Shoreham	38	8	5	25	53	94	−41	29	
18	Hailsham Town	38	4	6	28	47	149	−102	18 (Note: Hailsham Town reprieved from relegation.)	
19	East Preston	38	3	3	32	35	144	−109	12	Relegated to Division One
20	St Francis Rangers	38	1	3	34	10	214	−204	6	Relegated to Division One

Source: scfl.org.uk
Rules for classification: 1) points; 2) goal difference; 3) number of goals scored.

=== Results table ===
Home \ Away	UCK	ARU	BBH	CCH	EPR	EBT	EBU	HAI	HSK	HOR	HYM	LAN	LIT	LOX	NEW	PAG	SHO	STF	WIC	WRU
AFC Uckfield Town		2–2	1–1	0–6	8–1	0–2	1–1	0–0	2–1	0–5	2–4	1–3	2–1	3–3	1–7	0–4	1–1	6–0	4–0	0–0
Arundel	3–0		3–4	0–0	4–0	2–3	4–1	1–1	2–1	2–2	1–2	0–2	2–4	1–2	1–4	1–4	4–2	9–0	2–1	3–3
Broadbridge Heath	4–0	4–0		5–2	3–1	1–2	0–2	3–1	0–2	1–0	0–0	1–2	3–2	5–2	1–2	0–2	2–0	2–0	5–1	2–0
Chichester City	0–1	1–3	3–0		3–0	2–2	7–1	5–0	6–1	0–2	3–0	1–2	1–2	0–2	4–0	3–0	1–0	8–0	2–1	2–0
East Preston	1–0	2–2	2–2	0–4		0–1	1–3	0–2	1–2	0–2	0–3	0–3	2–6	0–2	0–5	1–8	3–0	3–0	0–4	0–0
Eastbourne Town	5–2	4–1	1–1	1–2	10–2		0–0	2–0	0–0	2–1	6–2	2–0	2–0	2–1	2–0	1–3	5–0	5–0	2–4	4–0
Eastbourne United Association	4–3	1–2	4–0	1–3	2–1	0–1		4–1	0–3	0–3	2–0	4–3	1–3	3–1	0–2	1–1	2–0	5–0	5–0	2–1
Hailsham Town	2–2	2–2	1–4	3–5	4–3	0–3	2–3		4–4	0–3	0–5	0–5	3–4	1–4	1–4	0–1	1–6	1–1	1–6	2–6
Hassocks	3–1	0–0	1–1	1–3	4–0	2–3	1–1	6–2		1–1	1–0	0–0	2–2	0–1	2–1	1–5	2–1	2–0	1–4	1–2
Horsham	2–0	2–1	3–0	4–1	7–0	4–5	1–1	11–1	2–1		4–1	4–1	2–0	4–0	1–0	4–0	5–0	5–0	7–0	1–0
Horsham YMCA	5–3	4–2	2–2	1–2	5–4	0–4	5–1	7–1	4–1	0–4		1–2	3–1	3–0	2–2	0–3	4–0	7–0	2–0	3–1
Lancing	1–1	4–1	3–2	3–1	8–0	4–0	2–4	5–1	3–0	0–3	1–2		4–1	0–4	0–3	0–0	2–0	8–0	6–1	4–1
Littlehampton Town	3–2	1–4	1–3	0–4	5–0	1–0	2–2	6–1	0–1	1–5	3–4	1–7		2–2	1–2	3–2	6–1	8–1	3–1	5–1
Loxwood	2–0	1–2	2–1	3–3	4–1	1–2	5–4	4–0	5–3	2–2	1–3	1–1	3–2		0–2	1–2	2–1	5–0	5–1	2–1
Newhaven	2–1	4–2	1–2	2–3	10–0	2–3	6–1	10–0	4–0	1–3	0–0	3–1	0–1	2–0		3–1	4–0	10–1	2–1	6–1
Pagham	5–2	0–4	4–0	1–0	4–0	2–2	1–3	2–0	1–0	0–1	4–3	1–2	2–1	0–1	0–2		1–1	6–0	4–2	2–3
Shoreham	2–0	0–3	1–3	1–1	4–1	0–2	3–4	0–4	1–1	0–5	1–1	1–2	1–3	0–6	2–0	2–3		8–0	4–1	1–3
St Francis Rangers	1–4	0–8	0–3	0–1	1–0	0–9	0–6	1–2	0–6	0–11	0–15	0–3	0–10	0–3	0–4	0–11	0–5		0–3	0–8
Wick & Barnham United	1–4	0–3	0–3	1–4	4–2	1–0	3–1	5–1	0–1	0–2	0–1	0–1	0–6	2–8	0–0	1–3	2–3	1–1		0–4
Worthing United	3–2	0–1	3–1	2–2	5–3	1–7	0–1	6–1	3–0	0–3	0–1	0–0	0–2	1–4	0–8	0–1	4–0	3–3	2–3	

Source: SCFL Fixtures and Results
Legend: Blue = home team win; Yellow = draw; Red = away team win.

== Division One ==
Southern Combination Division One
- Season: 2015–16
- Champions: Haywards Heath Town
- Promoted: Haywards Heath Town; Crawley Down Gatwick
- Matches: 272
- Goals: 1,075 (3.95 per match)

Division One featured ten clubs which competed in the Sussex County League Division Two last season, along with seven new clubs.

- Clubs relegated from the old Division One:
  - Crawley Down Gatwick
  - Ringmer
  - Selsey
- Clubs promoted from the old Division Three:
  - Langney Wanderers
  - Sidlesham
  - Southwick
- Plus:
  - Lingfield, demoted from the Southern Counties East League

Relegation from this division was not implemented for this season.

=== League table ===
Pos	Team	Pld	W	D	L	GF	GA	GD	Pts	Promotion or relegation
1	Haywards Heath Town	32	30	0	2	123	23	+100	90	Promoted to the Premier Division
2	Crawley Down Gatwick	32	24	2	6	88	50	+38	74	Promoted to the Premier Division
3	Oakwood	32	19	3	10	89	64	+25	60	
4	Storrington	32	18	4	10	68	45	+23	58	
5	Southwick	32	17	5	10	75	54	+21	56	
6	Mile Oak	32	17	4	11	61	52	+9	55	
7	Little Common	32	16	2	14	75	61	+14	50	
8	Lingfield	32	15	3	14	76	66	+10	48	
9	Langney Wanderers	32	14	5	13	73	55	+18	47	
10	Steyning Town	32	14	3	15	56	63	−7	45	
11	Sidlesham	32	14	1	17	54	72	−18	43	Demoted to Division Two
12	Ringmer	32	10	7	15	47	68	−21	37	
13	Selsey	32	9	4	19	53	88	−35	31	
14	Bexhill United	32	8	5	19	48	74	−26	29	
15	Midhurst & Easebourne	32	7	7	18	37	64	−27	28	
16	Seaford Town	32	5	4	23	22	67	−45	19	
17	Saltdean United	32	2	7	23	30	109	−79	13	

Source: scfl.org.uk
Rules for classification: 1) points; 2) goal difference; 3) number of goals scored.

=== Results table ===
Home \ Away	BEX	CDG	HHE	LAW	LIN	LIT	MID	MIL	OAK	RIN	SDU	SEA	SEL	SID	SOU	STE	STO
Bexhill United		1–2	1–5	2–2	1–0	0–2	0–1	1–1	1–2	4–1	2–2	3–0	2–4	0–1	1–5	6–1	2–1
Crawley Down Gatwick	3–1		2–1	3–0	6–4	5–2	2–1	5–1	5–3	3–0	5–0	1–0	4–1	5–3	0–0	3–2	2–0
Haywards Heath Town	4–1	4–1		2–1	6–1	2–1	5–0	5–1	3–1	1–0	12–0	5–0	8–2	3–0	1–3	2–0	4–0
Langney Wanderers	3–0	3–2	0–4		2–3	3–1	H/W	4–2	2–3	2–0	5–0	7–0	5–0	1–2	4–1	1–2	0–0
Lingfield	4–2	4–1	1–4	5–2		3–0	6–0	1–3	1–4	4–4	7–3	2–0	1–1	2–3	0–1	2–1	1–4
Little Common	3–1	2–3	3–0	3–2	5–1		3–1	2–1	4–4	4–2	1–0	3–1	5–1	4–2	3–5	0–1	0–2
Midhurst & Easebourne	1–1	1–1	1–4	1–6	2–0	2–1		0–2	0–1	1–1	4–1	2–1	4–1	3–0	0–4	2–3	0–1
Mile Oak	2–1	0–3	0–4	1–3	3–2	1–3	0–0		3–0	5–0	1–0	2–0	3–2	6–2	4–1	3–0	0–0
Oakwood	7–2	2–3	1–3	5–1	1–1	1–0	5–1	0–3		5–0	6–1	1–2	3–2	3–1	3–3	4–2	1–5
Ringmer	2–1	4–2	0–3	1–1	0–2	1–1	2–2	1–1	2–3		2–2	2–0	1–0	4–1	2–1	0–1	3–2
Saltdean United	1–3	1–2	1–6	1–1	0–3	0–10	3–2	1–3	1–5	0–3		1–1	1–1	4–2	1–4	2–2	1–5
Seaford Town	0–1	0–1	0–4	0–4	0–1	0–2	1–0	3–1	2–3	0–1	1–1		2–1	1–2	0–4	0–0	1–3
Selsey	2–0	2–1	1–6	5–3	3–1	1–2	2–1	1–3	2–5	5–3	H/W	1–2		3–0	1–1	1–1	0–5
Sidlesham	7–1	3–5	0–1	0–2	0–6	1–6	3–1	0–1	0–3	1–0	H/W	1–1	4–1		4–1	3–1	2–0
Southwick	2–2	1–3	1–2	2–0	0–2	3–2	2–2	2–0	2–0	2–3	2–1	2–1	5–4	0–3		4–1	7–1
Steyning Town	2–4	3–2	1–3	2–1	1–3	4–0	2–1	1–4	6–0	3–1	3–0	4–2	2–1	0–1	1–3		3–2
Storrington	1–0	0–2	1–3	2–2	3–2	4–0	0–0	4–0	0–4	5–1	5–0	1–0	4–1	3–2	2–1	2–0	

Source: SCFL Fixtures and Results
Legend: Blue = home team win; Yellow = draw; Red = away team win.

== Division Two ==
Southern Combination Division Two
- Season: 2016–17
- Champions: AFC Varndeanians
- Promoted: AFC Varndeanians; Billingshurst
- Relegated: Hurstpierpoint
- Matches: 240
- Goals: 1,004 (4.18 per match)

Division Two featured eight clubs which competed in the Sussex County League Division Three last season, along with eight new clubs.

- Clubs demoted from the old Division Two:
  - Rustington
  - Westfield
- Clubs joined from West Sussex League:
  - A.F.C. Roffey Club
  - Alfold
  - Cowfold
  - Upper Beeding
- Clubs joined from the Mid-Sussex League:
  - AFC Varndeanians, formerly known as Old Varndeanians
  - Montpelier Villa

In addition, Burgess Hill & Hurst Albion split and reverted to their original names of Hurstpierpoint (remaining in this league) and Burgess Hill Albion (joining the Mid Sussex League), while Ifield changed its name to Ifield Galaxy.

Promotion and relegation to and from this division was irregular, due to ground grading issues and other league constitution aspects.

=== League table ===
Pos	Team	Pld	W	D	L	GF	GA	GD	Pts	Promotion or relegation
1	AFC Varndeanians	30	22	4	4	91	26	+65	70	Promoted to Division One
2	Roffey	30	20	4	6	101	37	+64	64	
3	Cowfold	30	19	6	5	81	34	+47	63	
4	Rottingdean Village	30	19	6	5	71	32	+39	63	
5	Billingshurst	30	19	5	6	73	35	+38	62	Promoted to Division One
6	Bosham	30	18	5	7	70	27	+43	59	
7	Upper Beeding	30	14	10	6	70	39	+31	52	
8	Montpelier Villa	30	15	2	13	70	61	+9	47	
9	Rustington	30	11	7	12	68	64	+4	40	
10	Westfield	30	11	5	14	58	69	−11	38	
11	Ferring	30	9	4	17	54	77	−23	31	
12	Clymping	30	7	4	19	57	96	−39	25	
13	Alfold	30	5	8	17	41	75	−34	23	
14	Ifield Galaxy	30	7	1	22	41	108	−67	22	Resigned from the league
15	A.F.C. Roffey Club	30	3	4	23	34	95	−61	13	
16	Hurstpierpoint	30	2	3	25	24	129	−105	9	Resigned from the league

Source: scfl.org.uk
Rules for classification: 1) points; 2) goal difference; 3) number of goals scored.
