= JBFC =

JBFC may refer to:

- Jacob Burns Film Center, a non-profit cultural arts center in Pleasantville, New York
- Jarvis Brook F.C., an English football club based in Jarvis Brook, East Sussex
- Johnstone Burgh F.C., a Scottish football club based in Johnstone, Renfrewshire
