= 2020–21 Combined Counties Football League =

Combined Counties Football League
- Season: 2020–21

The 2020–21 Combined Counties Football League season (known as the 2020–21 Cherry Red Records Combined Counties Football League for sponsorship reasons) was the 43rd in the history of the Combined Counties Football League, a football competition in England. Teams were divided for the final time into two divisions; the Premier and the First. The constitution was announced on 21 July 2020. After the abandonment of the previous season due to the COVID-19 pandemic, the league's constitution remained largely unchanged, with the planned structural changes being put in place after this season.

The 2020–21 season started in September and was suspended on 21 December due to an ongoing spike in UK deaths from the COVID-19 pandemic. On 24 February 2021, the league season was abandoned as the pandemic deaths continued to rise. The league committee later announced a supplementary cup competition, the Fripp-Smith Trophy, to provide competitive football for their clubs. All clubs were invited to take part, with 23 ultimately accepting.

== Promotion, relegation and restructuring ==
The scheduled restructuring of non-league football took place at the end of the season to include a new division that was added to the Combined Counties at step 5 for 2021–22. Promotions from steps 5 to 4 and 6 to 5 were based on points per game across all matches over the two abandoned seasons (2019–20 and 2020–21), while teams were promoted to step 6 on the basis of a subjective application process.

== Premier Division ==
Combined Counties Football League Premier Division
- Champions: None
- Promoted: Sutton Common Rovers
- Relegated: None

The Premier Division was reduced from 21 to 20 clubs after Balham transferred to the Southern Counties East League as they moved to groundshare with AFC Croydon Athletic.

=== League table at time of curtailment ===
Pos	Team	Pld	W	D	L	GF	GA	GD	Pts	Promotion or qualification
1	Sutton Common Rovers	13	11	2	0	35	6	+29	35	Promotion to the Isthmian League South Central Division (Note: Sutton Common Rovers promoted based on points per game calculations from 2019–20 and 2020–21 seasons combined.)
2	Badshot Lea	14	10	1	3	32	19	+13	31	Transfer to the Combined Counties Premier South
3	Spelthorne Sports	15	9	2	4	36	13	+23	29	Transfer to the Combined Counties Premier North
4	Hanworth Villa	10	8	2	0	28	10	+18	26	Transfer to the Combined Counties Premier North
5	Southall	12	8	1	3	31	12	+19	25	Transfer to the Combined Counties Premier North
6	Ascot United	13	7	3	3	33	18	+15	24	Transfer to the Combined Counties Premier North
7	Knaphill	14	7	3	4	28	22	+6	24	Transfer to the Combined Counties Premier South
8	Banstead Athletic	14	5	5	4	17	14	+3	20	Transfer to the Combined Counties Premier South
9	Abbey Rangers	12	5	2	5	22	15	+7	17	Transfer to the Combined Counties Premier North
10	Sheerwater	13	5	2	6	19	17	+2	17	Transfer to the Combined Counties Premier South
11	Cobham	12	5	2	5	21	22	−1	17	Transfer to the Combined Counties Premier South
12	Camberley Town	10	5	0	5	10	14	−4	15	Transfer to the Combined Counties Premier South
13	Egham Town	13	4	2	7	19	26	−7	14	Transfer to the Combined Counties Premier North
14	Redhill	13	4	2	7	23	32	−9	14	Transfer to the Combined Counties Premier South
15	Colliers Wood United	14	3	3	8	17	31	−14	12	Transfer to the Combined Counties Premier South
16	Frimley Green	13	3	2	8	20	36	−16	11	Transfer to the Combined Counties Premier South
17	Raynes Park Vale	11	3	1	7	13	26	−13	10	Transfer to the Combined Counties Premier South
18	CB Hounslow United	10	1	3	6	12	25	−13	6	Transfer to the Combined Counties Premier North
19	Guildford City	9	1	1	7	8	20	−12	4	Transfer to the Combined Counties Premier South
20	Molesey	15	1	1	13	6	52	−46	4	Transfer to the Combined Counties Premier South

Source: FA Full-Time CCL Prem Div Table
Rules for classification: 1) points; 2) goal difference; 3) number of goals scored.

=== Results table ===
Home \ Away	ABB	ASC	BAD	BAN	CAM	CBH	COB	CWU	EGH	FRI	GLD	HAN	KNA	MOL	RED	RPV	SCR	SHE	SOU	SPE
Abbey Rangers	—			2–2	0–1	3–2		1–1		4–0					4–1			0–2		
Ascot United	0–4	—				3–1	1–1	5–2		6–0			1–1							
Badshot Lea	1–0		—						5–1		3–1		2–0		3–2		2–4	3–2		
Banstead Athletic			2–0	—	0–1		3–1		1–1		1–2			2–1			1–1			
Camberley Town		1–0	1–3		—				1–3						3–1			1–0	0–4	
CB Hounslow United			0–1			—					1–1			5–0					0–3	
Cobham			2–1	2–0			—	1–1				0–1				5–3			0–4	0–2
Colliers Wood United	2–0							—				2–4	0–2		3–4			2–2	1–3	0–3
Egham Town								0–1	—	2–2			2–4				0–2			
Frimley Green		0–4					3–5		3–2	—		1–2				4–0		2–0	3–3	
Guildford City	0–2								0–1		—							0–1		1–4
Hanworth Villa	3–2	3–0	2–2						3–1			—	1–1	5–0						
Knaphill						2–2			0–2	4–1	5–2		—	5–1		2–1	0–3			1–0
Molesey		1–7		3–1			0–3	0–2	0–3					—	0–0		0–2		0–4	
Redhill		3–4				4–1							4–1		—	0–2	0–5			1–1
Raynes Park Vale			1–4	0–3	2–1	0–0					2–1					—	1–3			
Sutton Common Rovers				0–0			3–1							4–0	4–1		—		1–0	3–0
Sheerwater				0–0	1–0					2–1				5–0	1–2			—		
Southall		0–1						2–0	4–1			1–4						3–1	—	
Spelthorne Sports		1–1	1–2	0–1		8–0		4–0		2–0				4–0		3–1		3–2		—

Legend: Blue = home team win; Yellow = draw; Red = away team win.

== Division One ==
Combined Counties Football League Division One
- Champions: None
- Promoted: Farnham Town; Walton & Hersham; Jersey Bulls
- Relegated: None

Division One remained at 20 clubs, and was unchanged from the previous season.

- Reserve sides are not eligible for promotion to Step 5.

=== League table at time of curtailment ===
Pos	Team	Pld	W	D	L	GF	GA	GD	Pts	Promotion or qualification
1	Farnham Town	12	10	1	1	28	11	+17	31	Promotion to Premier Division South (Note: Promotions based on points per game calculations from 2019–20 and 2020–21 seasons combined.)
2	Walton & Hersham	12	8	2	2	36	9	+27	26	Promotion to Premier Division South
3	Westside	11	8	0	3	25	12	+13	24	Transfer to the Southern Counties East League
4	Tooting Bec	11	7	2	2	27	12	+15	23	Transfer to the Southern Counties East League
5	FC Deportivo Galicia	11	6	2	3	28	15	+13	20	
6	Dorking Wanderers Reserves	13	6	2	5	27	26	+1	20	Transfer to the Southern Combination
7	Epsom & Ewell	11	6	1	4	20	10	+10	19	Transfer to the Southern Combination
8	Kensington & Ealing Borough	12	6	1	5	33	25	+8	19	
9	Fleet Spurs	13	6	1	6	19	20	−1	19	Transfer to the Wessex League
10	British Airways	12	5	2	5	18	19	−1	17	
11	Chessington & Hook United	15	5	2	8	19	36	−17	17	Transfer to the Southern Counties East League
12	Bedfont & Feltham	12	4	2	6	19	26	−7	14	
13	Godalming Town	14	4	2	8	21	32	−11	14	Transfer to the Southern Combination
14	Jersey Bulls	4	4	0	0	10	3	+7	12	Promotion to Premier Division South
15	Sandhurst Town	11	4	0	7	10	26	−16	12	
16	Eversley & California	12	3	2	7	18	23	−5	11	
17	Cove	11	3	2	6	13	22	−9	11	
18	A.F.C. Hayes	7	3	1	3	12	14	−2	10	
19	Ash United	10	2	1	7	22	26	−4	7	Transfer to the Wessex League
20	Bagshot	12	0	0	12	9	47	−38	0	

Source: FA Full-Time CCL Div One Table
Rules for classification: 1) points; 2) goal difference; 3) number of goals scored.

=== Results table ===
Home \ Away	ASH	BAG	BDF	BRI	CHU	COV	DGA	DOW	E&C	E&E	FAR	FLE	GOD	HAY	JER	K&E	SAN	TOO	WES	W&H
Ash United	—	7–0		2–3				2–3						5–1	2–3		1–3		0–3	
Bagshot		—		0–2							1–4	2–3		1–3				0–3		
Bedfont & Feltham	3–2	2–1	—		3–2										1–4		0–1			
British Airways				—				4–3	1–2			1–0			0–2		2–1			0–0
Chessington & Hook United			2–2		—	2–0	0–2	3–1	3–2		2–1						4–0	0–4	0–5	
Cove	1–1		1–1			—	1–0	1–3	2–1		1–3							0–5		
FC Deportivo Galicia					3–0		—	8–0				6–1		1–1						
Dorking Wanderers Reserves			3–1				4–0	—					5–1							
Eversley & California			3–1			1–5	1–1	0–0	—	1–2			1–2					2–3	4–1	
Epsom & Ewell				2–1	0–0	4–1				—									0–3	
Farnham Town		3–2						3–0		1–0	—		3–1			2–1	3–0			
Fleet Spurs			2–0	2–1	4–0	1–0						—	1–2		0–1	1–3				0–0
Godalming Town				1–1	3–1		2–4				1–2		—			2–3				
A.F.C. Hayes			2–4							2–1		3–1		—			0–1			
Jersey Bulls															—					
Kensington & Ealing Borough		8–2	3–1	4–2				1–1		0–2			5–1			—			2–4	
Sandhurst Town								2–0		0–6		1–3	0–2				—			
Tooting Bec		1–0					1–3			2–1	2–2		1–1			4–1		—		
Westside		2–0								0–2			1–0				5–1	2–1	—	0–2
Walton & Hersham	6–0	9–0			6–0		4–0	0–4	2–0		0–1		4–2			3–2				—

Legend: Blue = home team win; Yellow = draw; Red = away team win.

== Fripp-Smith Trophy ==
At the group stage, each team plays each other once.

=== Group A ===
Pos	Team	Pld	W	D	L	GF	GA	GD	Pts	Qualification	SAN	FLE	FRI	E&C	ASC	ASH
1	Sandhurst Town	4	4	0	0	23	3	+20	12	Advance to quarter final	—	X	3–1	P–P	X	9–0
2	Fleet Town	4	2	1	1	7	8	−1	7	Advance to quarter final	1–5	—	X	P–P	X	X
3	Frimley Green	5	2	1	2	9	11	−2	7		X	2–2	—	3–2	1–3	X
4	Eversley & California	3	1	1	1	7	5	+2	4		X	X	X	—	2–2	3–0
5	Ascot United	5	1	1	3	10	15	−5	4		1–6	0–1	X	X	—	4–5
6	Ash United	5	1	0	4	7	21	−14	3		X	1–3	1–2	X	X	—

Updated to match(es) played on 5 May 2021. Source:

=== Group B ===
Pos	Team	Pld	W	D	L	GF	GA	GD	Pts	Qualification	SPE	DGA	K&E	HAY	CBH	BRI
1	Spelthorne Sports	4	4	0	0	14	4	+10	12	Advance to quarter final	—	X	X	6–0	P–P	2–0
2	FC Deportivo Galicia	5	3	1	1	14	11	+3	10	Advance to quarter final	2–3	—	X	X	3–3	5–4
3	Kensington & Ealing Borough	4	2	0	2	8	7	+1	6		2–3	1–2	—	X	X	X
4	A.F.C. Hayes	4	1	0	3	4	9	−5	3		X	0–2	0–1	—	4–0	X
5	CB Hounslow United	4	0	2	2	6	12	−6	2		X	X	2–4	X	—	1–1
6	British Airways	3	0	1	2	5	8	−3	1		X	X	P–P	P–P	X	—

Updated to match(es) played on 5 May 2021. Source:

=== Group C ===
Pos	Team	Pld	W	D	L	GF	GA	GD	Pts	Qualification	BAD	SHE	GUI	GOD	FAR
1	Badshot Lea	3	3	0	0	7	0	+7	9	Advance to quarter final	—	X	X	A–A	3–0
2	Sheerwater	4	3	0	1	8	6	+2	9	Advance to quarter final	0–3	—	3–2	X	X
3	Guildford City	4	2	0	2	8	5	+3	6		0–1	X	—	X	2–1
4	Godalming Town	3	1	0	2	2	6	−4	3		X	1–2	0–4	—	X
5	Farnham Town	4	0	0	4	1	9	−8	0		X	0–3	X	0–1	—

Updated to match(es) played on 5 May 2021. Source:

=== Group D ===
Pos	Team	Pld	W	D	L	GF	GA	GD	Pts	Qualification	ABB	COB	RPV	RED	WES	TOO
1	Abbey Rangers	5	5	0	0	22	7	+15	15	Advance to quarter final	—	X	X	2–0	8–2	5–1
2	Cobham	5	4	0	1	11	5	+6	12	Advance to quarter final	1–3	—	X	X	X	2–0
3	Raynes Park Vale	5	3	0	2	13	9	+4	9		3–4	0–2	—	4–2	X	X
4	Redhill	5	2	0	3	11	11	0	6		X	2–3	X	—	4–1	X
5	Westside	5	1	0	4	6	19	−13	3		X	0–3	0–3	X	—	3–1
6	Tooting Bec	5	0	0	5	4	16	−12	0		X	X	1–3	1–3	X	—

Updated to match(es) played on 5 May 2021. Source:

=== Quarter-finals ===
6 May 2021	Sandhurst Town	6–2	FC Deportivo Galicia	Bottom Meadow, Sandhurst
19:45

8 May 2021	Abbey Rangers	1–1 (5–3 p)	Sheerwater	Addlestone Moor, Addlestone
15:00

8 May 2021	Badshot Lea	3–0	Fleet Town	Westfield Lane, Wrecclesham
15:00

11 May 2021	Spelthorne Sports	2–0	Cobham	Spelthorne Sports Club, Ashford
19:45

=== Semi-finals ===
15 May 2021	Badshot Lea	0–3	Sandhurst Town	Westfield Lane, Wrecclesham
15:00

15 May 2021	Spelthorne Sports	1–1 (4–2 p)	Abbey Rangers	Spelthorne Sports Club, Ashford
15:00

=== Final ===
22 May 2021	Sandhurst Town	1–0	Spelthorne Sports	Memorial Ground, Farnham
15:00	Bowerman (pen.)	Report
