= Crawley Down Gatwick F.C. =

Association football club in England

Coordinates: 51°7′37″N 0°4′29″W

Crawley Down Gatwick
- Full name: Crawley Down Gatwick Football Club
- Nickname: The Anvils
- Founded: 1993
- Ground: Haven Sportsfield, Crawley Down
- Capacity: 1,000
- Chairman: Dave Connor
- Manager: Martin Benetar
- League: Southern Combination Premier Division
- 2025–26: Southern Combination Premier Division, 12th of 20
- Website: crawleydowngatwickfc.co.uk
Home colours	Away colours

Crawley Down Gatwick Football Club is a football club based in Crawley Down, West Sussex, England. They are currently members of the Southern Combination Premier Division and play at the Haven Sportsfield.

== History ==
The club was established in 1993 as a merger of Crawley Down United and two other clubs, and was initially named Crawley Down Village. They took the place of Crawley Down United in the Premier Division of the Mid-Sussex League, and after a third-place finish in their first season, they were champions of the league in 1994–95, earning promotion to Division Three of the Sussex County League. In their first season in the Sussex County League, the club won the Sussex Intermediate Cup and were Division Three champions, resulting in promotion to Division Two.

In 1999 the club were renamed Crawley Down. Although they finished third in Division Two in 1998–99, they were unable to be promoted to Division One due to a lack of floodlights at their ground. In 1999–2000 they initially finished in a promotion place but were moved down to fourth place after Lancing were awarded three additional points after Mile Oak had fielded an ineligible player. In 2008–09 the club finished third in Division Two and were promoted to Division One after floodlights were installed.

Crawley Down were Division One champions in 2010–11 and were promoted to Division One South of the Isthmian League. That season also saw them win the Sussex RUR Cup, beating AFC Uckfield Town 2–0 in the final. In 2012 the club were renamed again, becoming Crawley Down Gatwick. The 2013–14 season saw them finish second-from-bottom of Division One South, resulting in relegation back to the Sussex County League. The following season saw a second successive relegation as they finished second-from-bottom of Division One of the Sussex County League. At the end of the season, the league and divisions were renamed, resulting in the club playing in Division One of the Southern Combination for the 2015–16 season.

In 2015–16 Crawley Down were Division One runners-up, earning promotion to the Premier Division. They were Premier Division runners-up in 2022–23, qualifying for an inter-step promotion play-off with Sutton Common Rovers from the Isthmian League. However, they lost 2–0 and remained in the Southern Combination.

== Ground ==
The club plays at the Haven Sportsfield on Hophurst Lane. The ground has a bar, which provides a small area of cover for spectators. A temporary perimeter fence is removed during the summer. Floodlights and a new stand were installed in 2007.

== Honours ==
- Southern Combination
  - Division One champions 2010–11
- Mid-Sussex League
  - Premier Division champions 1994–95
- Sussex RUR Cup
  - Winners 2010–11
- Sussex Intermediate Cup
  - Winners 1995–96

== Records ==
- Best FA Cup performance: First qualifying round, 2009–10, 2011–12, 2020–21
- Best FA Trophy performance: First qualifying round, 2012–13, 2013–14
- Best FA Vase best performance: Fourth round, 2024–25, 2025–26
- Record attendance: 404 vs East Grinstead Town, 1996

== See also ==
- Crawley Down Gatwick F.C. players
- Crawley Down Gatwick F.C. managers
