= Roffey F.C. =

Association football club in England

Roffey
- Full name: Roffey Football Club
- Nickname: The Boars
- Founded: 1901
- Ground: Hop Oast Stadium, Horsham
- Capacity: 3000
- Coordinates: 51°2′49″N 0°20′26″W
- Owner: Phil Gibbs
- Chairman: Phil Gibbs
- Manager: Naim Rouane
- League: Southern Combination Premier Division
- 2025–26: Southern Combination Premier Division, 10th of 20
- Website: https://roffeyfc.com/
Home colours

Roffey F.C. is an English football club located in Roffey, Horsham in West Sussex. The club are currently members of the Southern Combination Premier Division and play at The Hop Oast Stadium.

They have a local rivalry with another Horsham based side Horsham YM.

== History ==
Roffey was formed in 1901 and had been playing in the Mid-Sussex Football Leagues, in recent times they had three consecutive league wins between 2008 and 2010 by going from Division Three to Division One. In 2011 the club applied and were accepted to play in the Sussex County Football League for the 2011–12 season.

in the 2018–19 season the club came third in the table and secured promotion into Division One of the Southern Combination Football League, for the first time in their history they entered senior level football from the intermediate level. Roffey became Division One league champions in the 2021–22 season securing promotion into the Southern Combination League Premier Division for the first time. Following relegation in their first season at the level, the club were immediately promoted back to the Premier Division as champions in the 2023–24 season.

The club have made a couple of good runs in different cup competitions in recent season's including their best FA Vase run in the 2023–24 season making the third round. In the 2022–23 season they made the semi-final of the Sussex RUR Cup for the first time before losing 3-0 to Horsham YM.

At the end of the 2025-26 season the club announced that their first team would begin a 2-year ground share with Horsham which would see the club play their games at the Fusion Aviation Community Stadium until the end of the 2027-28 season. The club also announced that First Team Manager Jack Munday would be standing down following 3 years in the role to take on a new position as commercial manager and the club announced the appointment of former Lancing and Haywards Heath Town manager Naim Rouane as his successor to kick start a new era for the club.

== Stadium ==
Roffey currently play their home games at The Hop Oast Stadium, currently known for sponsorship purposes as the Fusion Aviation Community Stadium (on a groundshare agreement), the home of National League South side Horsham.

== Honours ==
=== League honors ===
- Southern Combination Football League:

Division One Winners (2): 2021–22, 2023–24
Division Two Runners Up (1): 2015–16

- Mid-Sussex Football League:

Division One Winners (1): 2009–10
Division Two Winners (1): 2008–09
Division Three Winners (1): 2007–08

=== Cup honors ===
- Southern Combination League Division Two Cup

Winners (1): 2013–14

- Sussex Intermediate Cup

Runners up (1): 2016–17

- Mid-Sussex Football League Senior Charity Cup:

Winners (1): 2014–15

== Records ==
Best FA Cup performance: extra preliminary round 2022-23, 2024-25, 2025-26, 2026-27

Best FA Vase performance: 3rd round proper 2023-24

Best Sussex Senior Cup performance: 3rd round 2024-25, 2025-26

Best Sussex RUR Cup performance: semi-final 2022-23, 2025-26

Highest League finish: 9th Southern Combination Football League Premier Division 2024-25

Highest attendance: 507 vs Pagham, Southern Combination Football League Premier Division, 8 March 2025

== Current squad ==
Note: Flags indicate national team as defined under FIFA eligibility rules; some limited exceptions apply. Players may hold more than one non-FIFA nationality.

No.	Pos.	Nation	Player
—	GK	ENG	Charlie Burton (on loan)
—	GK	ENG	Monty Watson-Price
—	DF	ENG	Charlie Gibson
—	DF	ENG	Luke Harrison
—	DF	ENG	Jack Meeres
—	DF	ENG	Pat Gibbs
—	DF	ENG	Jamie Smith
—	MF	ENG	Callum Chesworth
—	MF	ENG	Byron Napper
—	MF	ENG	Teddy Wood
—	MF	ENG	Jordan Mase (Vice-Captain)
—	MF	ENG	Daniel Pearse (Captain)
—	MF	ENG	Tom Caplin
—	MF	ENG	Callum Kilkenny
—	FW	ENG	Bailey Moyo

No.	Pos.	Nation	Player
—	FW	ENG	Stan Berry
—	FW	ENG	Luca Allen
—	FW	ENG	Evan Hoarty
—	FW	POR	Max Mesquita
—	FW	ENG	Hayden Skerry
—	GK	ENG	Joe Berry (Youth Player)
—	DF	ENG	Aidan Mountford (Youth Player)
—	MF	ENG	James Dodd (Youth Player)
—	MF	ENG	George Horner (Youth Player)
—	MF	ENG	AJ Kiamtia (Youth Player)
—			
—			

== Club management ==
Position	Name
First Team Manager	Naim Rouane
First Team Assistant Manager	Daniel Mobsby
First Team Goalkeeping Coach	Scott Percy
First Team Head Analyst	Monty Watson-Price
First Team Support Coach	Daniel Edwards
First Team Physio	Amelia Montague
First Team Strength & Conditioning Coach	Daniel Pearse
First Team Kit Managers	Sam Chapman & Monty Watson-Price
U18 Manager	Dean Potter
U18 Assistant Manager	Monty Watson-Price
U18 Coach	Calum Curryer
President	Keith Edwards
Chairman	Phillip Gibbs
Vice Chairman	Mark Powling
General Manager	Julian Miller
Commercial Director	Jack Munday
Head of Youth	Dean Potter
Club Secretary	Helen Gibbs
Youth Secretary	Monty Watson-Price
Treasurer	Andrew Chantrill
Club Welfare Officer	Jade Merries
First Team Fixtures Secretary	Jaymie Wicker
Social Media Managers	Beth Chapman & Jaymie Wicker
Photographer	Beth Chapman
Programme Design & Edit	Sam Chapman
Pitch Maintenance Team	Sam Chapman, Julian Miller & Richard Harris
