= Epsom & Ewell F.C. =

Association football club in England

Coordinates: 51°22′20″N 0°17′14″W

Epsom & Ewell
- Full name: Epsom & Ewell Football Club
- Nickname: The Salts
- Founded: 1918
- Ground: Chalky Lane, Chessington
- Capacity: 3,000 (167 seated)
- Chairman: Mel Tough
- Manager: Max Johnson & Craig Dundas
- League: Combined Counties League Premier Division South
- 2025–26: Combined Counties League Premier Division South, 13th of 20
- Website: epsomandewellfc.co.uk
Home colours	Away colours

Epsom & Ewell Football Club is a football club based in Epsom, Surrey, England. Affiliated to the Surrey County Football Association, the club are currently members of the Combined Counties League Premier Division South and groundshare at Chessington & Hook United FC's Chalky Lane ground. The club have played outside Epsom since leaving their West Street Ground in 1993.

== History ==
The club was established in March 1918 as Epsom Juniors and played cricket during the summer of that year. At the end of the summer a football team was formed, joining the Surrey Junior League in 1919. Although they finished bottom of the table in their first season, they became founders of the Sutton & District League in 1920. Renamed Epsom Town in 1922, they were Premier Division champions in 1922–23. The club subsequently transferred to the Southern Suburban League, which they won at the first attempt without losing a game. They then moved up to the Surrey Senior League. After finishing third in their first season in the league, the club won back-to-back league titles in 1925–26 and 1926–27, as well as winning the league's Charity Cup in 1926–27 with a 1–0 win over Egham.

After their success in the Surrey Senior League, Epsom moved up to the Premier Division of the London League in 1927, going on to win the division in 1927–28. They finished as runners-up in 1931–32 and 1932–33, also winning the Surrey Senior Shield in 1932–33 with a 5–0 win against Woking in the final held at Woking's Kingfield Stadium. They reached the first round of the FA Cup for the first time in their history in 1933–34, losing 4–2 at Leyton Orient. In 1934 the club was renamed Epsom, and they went on to finish as Premier Division runners-up again in 1934–35, 1936–37 and 1937–38. In 1949 the club joined the Corinthian League. They won the Surrey Senior Shield in 1954–55, beating Carshalton Athletic 1–0 in the final. The 1959–60 season saw the club win the league's Memorial Shield with a 2–0 win against Maidenhead United. In 1960 the club adopted its current name.

When the Corinthian League was disbanded in 1963, Epsom & Ewell joined Division One of the Athenian League alongside most of the other teams from the league. They were relegated to Division Two at the end of the 1964–65 season, having finished bottom of Division One. The club subsequently struggled in Division Two, finishing bottom in 1970–71 and 1971–72. In 1973 they dropped back into the Surrey Senior League. Their first season back in the league saw them finish as runners-up and win the League Cup. The following season, 1974–75, the club won the league and the League Cup, as well as reaching the final of the FA Vase, losing 2–1 to Hoddesdon Town at Wembley Stadium. The club were promoted back to Division Two of the Athenian League and were runners-up in their first season back in the division, resulting in promotion to Division One. In 1977 the club transferred to Division Two of the Isthmian League, which they won at the first attempt, earning promotion to Division One. In 1979–80 the club won the Southern Combination Challenge Cup, beating Hampton 7–2 in the final, which was played at Hampton's home ground.

Epsom & Ewell remained in Division One until the end of the 1983–84 season, when they were promoted to the Premier Division after finishing as runners-up in Division Two under manager Adrian Hill. However, when Hill left the club to join Croydon in 1985, the club struggled; they finished bottom of the Premier Division in 1985–86, resulting in relegation back to Division One. The following season also ended in relegation, with the club placed in Division Two South for the 1987–88 season. League reorganisation in 1991 saw them moved to Division Three, where they remained until another round of reorganisation resulted in the club being placed in Division One South. However, they were relegated to Division Two at the end of the 2003–04 after finishing bottom of their division. In 2006 they were transferred to the Premier Division of the Combined Counties League when Division Two of the Isthmian League was scrapped. In 2012–13 the club won the Combined Counties League Premier Challenge Cup with a 3–0 win over South Park in the final at Cherrywood Road.

The 2017–18 season saw Epsom & Ewell finish second-from-bottom of the Premier Division, resulting in relegation to Division One. At the end of the 2020–21 season the club were transferred to Division One of the Southern Combination League. In 2022–23 they were runners-up in Division One, qualifying for the promotion play-offs. After defeating Selsey 6–5 on penalties in the semi-finals (after a 0–0 draw), they beat Wick 2–1 in the final, earning promotion to the Premier Division South of the Combined Counties League. In 2024–25 the club won the Southern Combination Challenge Cup for a second time, beating Abbey Rangers 1–0 in the final.

== Ground ==
Epsom Juniors played their first matches at Alexandra Recreation Ground, before moving to the Horton Hospital Sports Ground in the early 1920s. In 1925 they moved to West Street in Ewell, the former ground of Ewell Football Club. In 1939 Epsom Town, a newly formed Surrey Senior League club, began groundsharing at West Street, but were forced to leave when Epsom reclaimed the ground after World War II, subsequently folding in 1946.

In 1993 the club sold their West Street Ground and became tenants of Banstead Athletic at Merland Rise in Tadworth. In 2010, the club left Merland Rise to move to Moatside, home of Merstham. At the end of the 2011–12 season, the club announced it was moving to Chipstead's High Road ground. In 2020 the club relocated to Leatherhead's Fetcham Grove. They moved to Cobham's Leg O' Mutton Field in 2023, and then to Corinthian-Casuals' King George's Field for the 2024–25 season., back to Leg O' Mutton Field for the start of the 2025–26 season before moving to Chalky Lane from October 2025 on a long-term groundshare.

== Honours ==
- Isthmian League
  - Division Two champions 1977–78
- London League
  - Premier Division champions 1927–28
- Corinthian League
  - Memorial Shield winners 1959–60
- Combined Counties League
  - Premier Challenge Cup winners 2012–13
- Surrey Senior League
  - Champions 1925–26, 1926–27, 1974–75
  - League Cup winners 1973–74, 1974–75
  - Charity Cup winners 1926–27
- Southern Suburban League
  - Champions 1923–24
- Sutton and District League
  - Premier Division champions 1922–23
- Surrey Senior Cup
  - Winners 1980–81
- Surrey Senior Shield
  - Winners 1932–33, 1954–55
- Southern Combination Challenge Cup
  - Winners 1979–80, 2024–25

== Records ==
- Best FA Cup performance: First round, 1933–34
- Best FA Trophy performance: Second round (last 32) 1981–82
- Best FA Vase performance: Finalists, 1974–75
- Biggest win: 13–1 vs Reigate Priory, FA Amateur Cup, 12 October 1935
- Heaviest defeat: 14–0 vs Chelmsford City Reserves, London League, 14 February 1948
- Most appearances: Graham Morris, 658 (1990–2004)
- Most goals: Tommy Tuite, 391 (1973–1988)
  - Most goals in a season: Reg Marlow, 65 (1926–27)

== See also ==
- Epsom & Ewell F.C. players
- Epsom & Ewell F.C. managers
