= AFC Varndeanians F.C. =

Association football club in England

AFC Varndeanians
- Full name: AFC Varndeanians Football Club
- Nickname: The V’s
- Founded: 1929
- Ground: Withdean Stadium, Brighton
- Chairman: Dave Bridges
- Manager: Bradley Bant
- League: Southern Combination Premier Division
- 2025–26: Southern Combination Premier Division, 18th of 20
Home colours	Away colours

AFC Varndeanians Football Club is a football club based in Brighton, East Sussex, England. The club are currently members of the Southern Combination Premier Division and play at the Withdean Stadium.

== History ==
The club was formed as Old Varndeanians Football Club in 1929, when Secondary Old Boys club (which was dominated by former pupils of Varndean School) was renamed and decided only to accept former Varndeanians as players. Secondary Old Boys had been members of Division One of the Brighton, Hove & District League, with the new club continuing in their place. They were relegated to Division Two in 1930–31, and after finishing bottom of Division Two in 1934–35, were relegated to Division Three.

Old Varndeanians were dissolved during World War II before being re-established in 1946, playing at Preston Park. They rejoined the Brighton, Hove & District League for the 1947–48 season, becoming members of Division Three. After finishing as runners-up in their first season back in the league, they were promoted to Division Two. They finished fourth in Division Two in 1948–49, after which it was renamed the Intermediate Division. After a fifth-placed finish in 1951–52 the club were promoted to the Senior Division.

They moved up to Division Two of the Sussex County League in 1956. They were runners-up in 1956–57 (also winning the Invitation Cup), 1957–58 and 1958–59, before winning the division in 1959–60, resulting in promotion to Division One. The club rules were also loosened to allow brothers and sons of former pupils to play for the club. After finishing bottom of division in 1961–62, they were relegated back to Division Two. They remained in Division Two until leaving the league in 1973.

The club rejoined the Brighton, Hove & District League and were placed in Premier Division, which they won in their first season back in the league. The club were Premier Division runners-up in 1979–80, 1987–88, 1991–92, 1995–96 and 1997–98, before winning a second title in 1999–2000. They went on to win retain the title the following season, and after finishing as runners-up in 2001–02, the club were champions again in 2002–03.

Old Varndeanians transferred to the Mid-Sussex League in 2003, winning the Premier Division in their first season and again in 2006–07 and 2008–09. In 2004–05 they won both the Montgomery Cup and the Allan Washer League Trophy. In 2015 the club adopted their current name. They finished seventh in the Premier Division in 2014–15, and switched to Division Two of the Southern Combination League (a renamed Sussex County League) for the 2015–16 season. They won the division at the first attempt, earning promotion to Division One.

In 2021 AFC Varndeanians were promoted to the Premier Division based on their results in the abandoned 2019–20 and 2020–21 seasons.

== Honours ==
- Southern Combination League
  - Division Two champions 1959–60 (second tier), 2015–16 (third tier)
  - Division Two Invitation Cup winners 1956–57
- Mid-Sussex League
  - Premier Division champions 2003–04, 2006–07, 2008–09
  - Montgomery Challenge Cup winners 2004–05
  - Allan Washer League Trophy winners 2004–05
- Brighton, Hove & District League
  - Premier Division champions 1973–74, 1999–2000, 2000–01, 2002–03
- Hove and Worthing Cup
  - Winners 1948–49

== Records ==
- Best FA Cup performance: First qualifying round, 2019–20
- Best FA Vase performance: Second round, 2026–27
