= Jarvis Brook F.C. =

Association football club in England

Coordinates: 51°03′13.8″N 0°11′21.8″E

Jarvis Brook
- Full name: Jarvis Brook Football Club
- Nickname: The Brook
- Founded: 1897; 129 years ago (as Jarvis Brook United)
- Ground: Limekiln Playing Fields, Jarvis Brook
- Chairman: Carl Berwick
- Manager: Raffy Pearce
- League: Southern Combination Division One
- 2025–26: Southern Combination Division One, 9th of 18
- Website: jarvisbrookfc.co.uk
Home colours	Away colours

Jarvis Brook Football Club is a football club based in Jarvis Brook, East Sussex, England. They are currently members of the Southern Combination Division One and play at Limekiln Playing Fields.

== History ==
=== Early history ===
The club was formed in 1897 as Jarvis Brook United but was later changed to Jarvis Brook FC by the turn of the century. The first recorded game was on 25 September 1897 with Rotherfield St Denys by the Kent & Sussex Courier. In 1900 the club had to resign from the Crowborough League, but in the 1904–05 season the club had won its first trophy, winning the Crowborough and District League, also winning the same trophy in the 1905–06 and 1906–07 seasons. The 1906–07 season also saw Jarvis Brook lift the Tunbridge Wells & District Football League Shield.

In the 1910s, Jarvis Brook won the league a further three times and won the Tunbridge Wells & District League Shield again in 1912. The club went into financial difficulty shortly after as someone ran off with the club funds, but an anonymous cheque was sent to the club in October 1912 that cleared the debts, along with other fundraising and donations. No football was played during the Great War and resumed shortly after, with more trophies claimed: the Humble Crofts Challenge Cup and the Crowborough League Division 2 Cup in 1921, the Tunbridge Wells League Division 2 Cup in 1924 and the Crowborough League Division 1 Cup in 1926. By this time the club was playing matches at the Rosehill Ground and also the Gasworks Ground.

The 1930's saw Jarvis Brook win 7 trophies, winning the Tunbridge Wells Division 2 in 1932 and the Humble Crofts Cup three seasons in a row between 1933 and 1935, being runners-up in 1936. Leaving the Tunbridge Wells league in 1936, they entered the East Hoathly League and ended the 1936–37 season with a double, the Division 1 Championship and the Senior Cup. They finished the 1930s winning the 1938–39 Crowborough League Division 2.

After the Second World War, the club resumed in 1946 and entered teams into three different leagues. The club saw its most successful season in 1948–49 when they won a total of five trophies: the Tunbridge Wells Division 3 League Cup, the Crowborough League Division 1 League Cup, the Tunbridge Wells Senior Charity Cup, the Crowborough League Division 2 League Cup and the Tunbridge Wells Division 3 Knock-out Cup.

=== Recent History ===
Having played in leagues around the Tonbridge area, Jarvis Brook joined the Mid Sussex Football League in the late 1980s. They won their first trophy in 1995, the Stubbins Cup, in which they further won in 2000 and 2002. In 1999–2000 season they won Division Four, and saw three consecutive promotions in the 2001–02, 2002–03 and 2003–04 seasons into the Premier Division. Winning the 2015–16 Mid Sussex League Premier Division, they transferred to Division Two of the Southern Combination Football League, finishing runners-up in the 2016–17 season. Winning Division Two in 2022–23. Jarvis Brook won the Division Two league cup two seasons in a row, 2024 and 2025, In 2025 they finished 2nd and were approved promotion into Division One for the 2025–26 season. In 2026 Jarvis Brook hired 21 year old Raffy Pearce, son of former Premier League winner Ian Pearce, as their manager.

== Ground ==
The club play their home games at Limekiln Playing Fields, Palesgate Lane, Crowborough, TN6 3HG

== Honours ==
=== League ===
- East Hoathly League
  - Division 1 Champions (1): 1936–37
- Crowborough & District League
  - Champions (3): 1904–05, 1905–06, 1906–07
  - Division 2 Champions (1): 1938–39
- Mid Sussex Football League
  - Premier Division Champions (1): 2015–16
  - Division One Champions (1): 2003–04
  - Division Two Champions (1): 2002–03
  - Division Three Champions (1): 2001–02
  - Division Four Champions (1): 1999–2000
- Southern Combination Football League
  - Division 2 Champions (1): 2022–23
- Tunbridge Wells League
  - Division 2 Champions (1): 1931–32

=== Cups ===
- Crowborough League Division 1 League Cup
  - Winners (2): 1925–26, 1948–49
- Crowborough League Division 2 League Cup
  - Winners (2): 1920–21, 1948–49
- East Hoathly Senior Cup
  - Winners (1): 1936–37
- Humble Crofts Challenge Cup
  - Winners (4): 1920–21, 1932–33, 1933–34, 1934–35
  - Runners up (1): 1935–36
- Mid Sussex Football League
  - Stubbins Cup Winners (3): 1994–95, 1999–2000, 2001–02
- Southern Combination Football League
  - Division 2 League Cup Winners (2): 2023–24, 2024–25
- Tunbridge Wells League
  - Division 2 League Cup Winners (1): 1923–24
  - Division 3 League Cup Winners (1): 1948–49
  - Division 3 Knock-out Cup Winners (1): 1948–49
- Tunbridge Wells & District Football League Shield
  - Winners (2): 1906–07, 1911–12
- Tunbridge Wells Senior Charity Cup
  - Winners (1): 1948–49

== Records ==
- FA Vase
  - First Round 2026–27
