= Wick, West Sussex =

Suburb of Littlehampton, West Sussex, England

Coordinates: 50.81806°N 0.54419°W

Wick
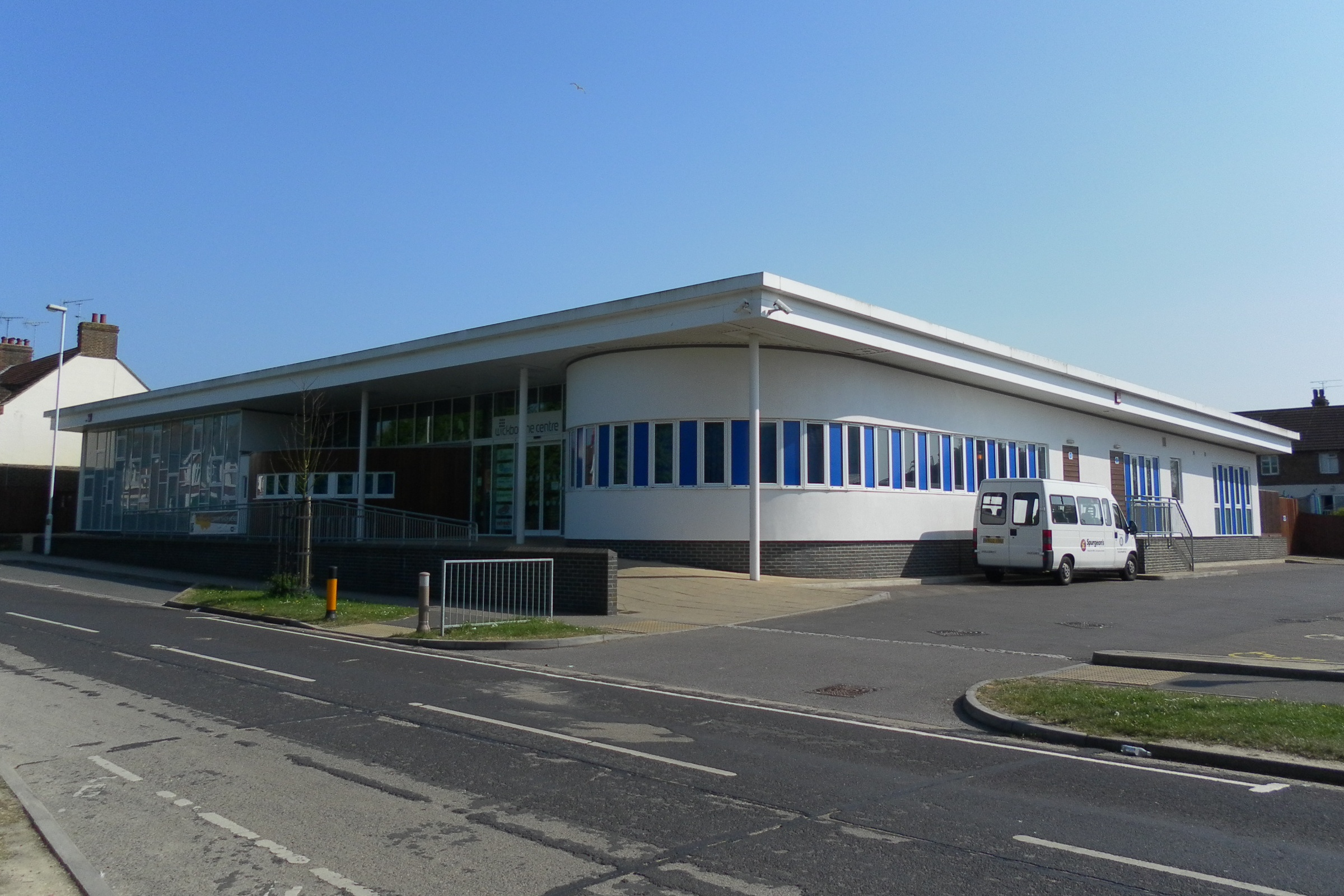
- The Wickbourne Centre, Wick

- Location within West Sussex
- OS grid reference: TQ026030
- Civil parish: Littlehampton
- District: Arun
- Shire county: West Sussex
- Region: South East
- Country: England
- Sovereign state: United Kingdom
- Post town: LITTLEHAMPTON
- Postcode district: BN17
- Dialling code: 01903
- Police: Sussex
- Fire: West Sussex
- Ambulance: South East Coast
- UK Parliament: Bognor Regis and Littlehampton

Wick is a suburb of Littlehampton in the Arun district of West Sussex, England. Originally a separate village, it now forms part of the built up area around the town and is on the A284 road 1 miles (1 km) to the north of Littlehampton.

There is an annual summer festival held in Wick. The Church Hall (Wick Hall) is one of the largest in the area, there are several flint Victorian buildings including All Saints Church, Lyminster School and one thatched cottage.

== History ==
The village of Wick formed around Wick Manor, established after the Norman Conquest of 1066. It has an ancient Roman Brick/clay making site, (this now lies under a road called 'Potters Mead', off Courtwick Road). Wick had an Art Deco era Steam Laundry built in the 1920s, it has now been demolished.

An Alleyway or Twitten that passes by the site of the former True Blue public house, is known locally as 'Dark Alley' due to the black clinker surface laid down along its route.

During the early 1990s some areas of Wick had developed a reputation for drug and alcohol addiction, high teenage pregnancy, and low ‘community esteem’ this resulted in the establishment of a Christian charity called "The WIRE project" to address these issues. In recent years, efforts have been made to improve the quality of Wick's social housing, with many being refurbished.

In 1901 Wick became a separate civil parish, being formed from part of Lyminster, on 1 April 1974 the parish was abolished and merged with Littlehampton. In 1951 the parish had a population of 4138.

== Sport and leisure ==
Wick has a Non-League football club Wick F.C. who play at Crabtree Park.
