= Rustington F.C. =

Association football club in England

Coordinates: 50°48′52.03″N 0°30′27.02″W

Rustington
- Full name: Rustington Football Club
- Nicknames: The Blues, The Ton
- Founded: 1903
- Ground: Woodlands Recreation Ground, Rustington
- Chairman: Ian Grant
- Manager: Tom Barnes
- League: Southern Combination Division Two
- 2025–26: Southern Combination Division Two, 2nd of 15
- Website: http://www.rustingtonfc.co.uk/
Home colours	Away colours	Third colours

Rustington F.C. is a football club based in the village of Rustington, West Sussex, England. The club are currently members of the Southern Combination Division Two and play at the Recreation Ground.

== History ==
Rustington Football Club were established in 1903 and joined the Bognor District League. After World War I they joined the Littlehampton District League, winning it in 1932–33, 1933–34, 1947–48 and 1948–49. They later joined the West Sussex League, which they won in 1999–2000 and again in 2003–04, before joining Division Three of the Sussex County League ahead of the 2004-05 season.

After recording an eighth placed finish in their first season, in 2006–07 Rustington won Division Three, going unbeaten in the league for the whole of 2006, this resulted them being featured on Sky Sports. The record was to remain until 24 February 2007, when it was ended by Haywards Heath. They become champions of Division Two in 2017-18 and 2018-19 but were ineligible for promotion to Division One of the Southern Combination. They were also champions three consecutive seasons (2018-19 - 2021–22).

The 2024-25 season was a historic one, under the management of Tom Barnes it saw the club complete the season ‘invincible’ in the league, going unbeaten on their way to the SCFL Division 2 title, a feat not achieved by any SCFL club for 50 years. They also retained the SCFA Intermediate cup, winning it for the fourth time and the first team to retain it since 1957.

The club was previously sponsored by British rock band Royal Blood.

== Honours ==
=== League honours ===
- Southern Combination League Division Two
  - Champions (4) 2017–18, 2018–19, 2021–22, 2024–25
- Sussex County Football League Division Three
  - Champions 2006–07
- West Sussex Football League Premier Division:
  - Champions (2): 1999–00, 2003–04
- West Sussex Football League Division Three South:
  - Champions (1): 1970–71

=== Cup honours ===
- The Sussex Royal Ulster Rifles Charity Cup
  - Runners Up (1): 2008–09
- Sussex FA Intermediate Challenge Cup
  - Winners (4): 2004–05, 2017–18, 2023–24, 2024-25
- Sussex County League Division 3 Cup
  - Winners (2): 2004–05, 2005–06
- SCFL Division 2 Cup
  - Winners (3): 2018–2019, 2024-2025, 2025-2026
- Sussex Junior Challenge Cup
  - Winners 2000–01
- Vernon Wentworth Invitation Cup
  - Winners 2004–05, 2005–06, 2006–07
- Centenary Cup
  - Winners 1999–2000
- Malcolm Simmonds Memorial Cup
  - Winners 1974–75, 1975–76
- Bareham Trophy (Rustington Reserves)
  - Winners 1995–96, 1998–99, 2003–04

== Club records ==
- Highest League Position:
  - 3rd in Sussex County League Division Two (Old Division One): 2007–08
- Highest Attendance:
  - 454 vs Littlehampton Town: 2006–07
