= ASC Brighton Rangers F.C. =

Association football club in England

Coordinates: 50°59′14.15″N 0°05′44.84″W

ASC Brighton Rangers
- Full name: ASC Brighton Rangers Football Club
- Nickname: Rangers
- Founded: 2002
- Ground: Culver Road, Lancing
- Capacity: 1,500
- Chairman: Del Tobias
- Manager: DJ Hamilton
- League: Southern Combination Division Two
- 2025–26: Southern Combination Division Two, 9th of 15
Home colours	Away colours

ASC Brighton Rangers F.C. is a football club based in Lancing, England. They are currently members of the Southern Combination Division Two and play at Culver Road, Lancing.

== History ==
The club was founded as St Francis Rangers in 2002 from the amalgamation of St Francis FC and Ansty Rangers. The team were promoted from the third division of the Sussex County League in 2004 and were promoted again three years later. In the 2015–16 season, The Argus newspaper dubbed St Francis Rangers 'the worst football team in England' during a season where they only won once and were relegated (at the time the article was written, the team had lost all of the 23 games they had played up to that point) from the Premier Division of the Southern Combination Football League to Division One, where they remained until the club folded in December 2018.

On 23 May 2019, Whitehawk F.C. Under 18's manager Del Tobias and a partner, took on the club, re-founded it and re-entered the team into the 2019–20 Southern Combination Football League Division Two as an intermediate team with ambitions to rebuild the club. In May 2025 the club was renamed to ASC Brighton Rangers following a merger with ASC Strikers, moving from Haywards Heath to Lancing.
