= 1997–98 Sussex County Football League =

The 1997–98 Sussex County Football League season was the 73rd in the history of Sussex County Football League a football competition in England.

== Division One ==
Sussex County Football League Division One
- Season: 1997–98
- Champions: Burgess Hill Town
- Relegated: Mile Oak; Peacehaven & Telscombe; Arundel
- Matches: 380
- Goals: 1,287 (3.39 per match)

Division One featured 17 clubs which competed in the division last season, along with three new clubs, promoted from Division Two:

- Chichester City
- Littlehampton Town
- Redhill

=== League table ===
Pos	Team	Pld	W	D	L	GF	GA	GD	Pts	Qualification or relegation
1	Burgess Hill Town	38	29	5	4	105	34	+71	92	
2	Littlehampton Town	38	27	6	5	102	45	+57	87	
3	Wick	38	23	7	8	81	39	+42	76	
4	Langney Sports	38	23	5	10	77	46	+31	74	
5	Redhill	38	21	5	12	85	38	+47	68	
6	Saltdean United	38	20	6	12	76	67	+9	66	
7	Ringmer	38	16	10	12	67	59	+8	58	
8	Selsey	38	14	12	12	60	51	+9	54	
9	Pagham	38	14	12	12	41	42	−1	54	
10	Shoreham	38	16	6	16	55	58	−3	54	
11	Whitehawk	38	12	12	14	50	54	−4	48	
12	Hassocks	38	11	11	16	53	62	−9	44	
13	Horsham YMCA	38	13	5	20	72	83	−11	44	
14	Eastbourne Town	38	12	7	19	54	73	−19	43	
15	Portfield	38	11	8	19	58	85	−27	41	
16	Chichester City	38	10	9	19	62	76	−14	39	
17	Hailsham Town	38	12	1	25	60	96	−36	37	
18	Mile Oak	38	8	10	20	45	71	−26	34	Relegated to Division Two
19	Peacehaven & Telscombe	38	7	8	23	40	88	−48	29	Relegated to Division Two
20	Arundel	38	6	5	27	44	120	−76	23	Relegated to Division Two

Source: nonleaguematters
Rules for classification: 1) points; 2) goal difference; 3) number of goals scored.

== Division Two ==
Sussex County Football League Division Two
- Season: 1997–98
- Champions: East Preston
- Promoted: East Preston; Eastbourne United; Broadbridge Heath
- Relegated: Midhurst & Easebourne; Bexhill Town
- Matches: 306
- Goals: 1,138 (3.72 per match)

Division Two featured 13 clubs which competed in the division last season, along with five new clubs.

- Clubs relegated from Division One:
  - Oakwood
  - Southwick
  - Three Bridges
- Clubs promoted from Division Three:
  - Shinewater Association
  - Sidlesham

Also, East Grinstead changed name to East Grinstead Town.

=== League table ===
Pos	Team	Pld	W	D	L	GF	GA	GD	Pts	Qualification or relegation
1	East Preston	34	25	5	4	113	42	+71	80	Promoted to Division One
2	Eastbourne United	34	21	6	7	82	36	+46	69	Promoted to Division One
3	Broadbridge Heath	34	20	3	11	72	46	+26	63	Promoted to Division One
4	Sidley United	34	18	9	7	68	42	+26	63	
5	Sidlesham	34	17	9	8	72	49	+23	60	
6	Shinewater Association	34	17	5	12	62	50	+12	56	
7	Three Bridges	34	16	6	12	63	52	+11	54	
8	Southwick	34	16	6	12	70	64	+6	54	
9	Worthing United	34	13	7	14	68	68	0	46	
10	East Grinstead Town	34	13	6	15	51	51	0	45	
11	Crawley Down Village	34	12	8	14	56	68	−12	44	
12	Crowborough Athletic	34	12	6	16	53	65	−12	42	
13	Lancing	34	12	4	18	57	84	−27	40	
14	Oakwood	34	10	9	15	70	60	+10	39	
15	Withdean	34	9	8	17	52	75	−23	35	
16	Newhaven	34	7	9	18	40	80	−40	30	
17	Midhurst & Easebourne	34	8	4	22	47	115	−68	28	Relegated to Division Three
18	Bexhill Town	34	4	2	28	42	91	−49	14	Relegated to Division Three

Source: nonleaguematters
Rules for classification: 1) points; 2) goal difference; 3) number of goals scored.

== Division Three ==
Sussex County Football League Division Three
- Season: 1997–98
- Champions: Lingfield
- Promoted: Lingfield; Storrington
- Relegated: Bosham
- Matches: 240
- Goals: 851 (3.55 per match)

Division Three featured twelve clubs which competed in the division last season, along with four new clubs:

- Bosham, relegated from Division Two
- Oving Social Club
- Steyning Town, relegated from Division Two
- Westfield, joined from the East Sussex League

Also, Sun Alliance changed name to Royal Sun Alliance.

=== League table ===
Pos	Team	Pld	W	D	L	GF	GA	GD	Pts	Qualification or relegation
1	Lingfield	30	19	8	3	70	24	+46	65	Promoted to Division Two
2	Storrington	30	19	7	4	70	32	+38	64	Promoted to Division Two
3	Oving Social Club	30	18	7	5	75	41	+34	61	
4	Westfield	30	14	8	8	75	55	+20	50	
5	St Francis Hospital	30	14	6	10	59	52	+7	48	
6	Uckfield Town	30	13	7	10	54	35	+19	46	
7	Franklands Village	30	12	8	10	59	51	+8	44	
8	Hurstpierpoint	30	11	11	8	53	50	+3	44	
9	Ifield	30	11	9	10	58	49	+9	42	
10	Ansty Rangers	30	12	6	12	61	60	+1	42	
11	Buxted	30	11	4	15	39	54	−15	37	
12	Royal & Sun Alliance	30	8	7	15	54	72	−18	31	
13	Steyning Town	30	9	4	17	36	58	−22	31	
14	Haywards Heath Town	30	5	8	17	36	64	−28	23	
15	Forest	30	4	10	16	25	59	−34	22	
16	Bosham	30	2	6	22	27	95	−68	12	Relegated to the West Sussex League

Source: nonleaguematters
Rules for classification: 1) points; 2) goal difference; 3) number of goals scored.
