= 2002–03 Sussex County Football League =

The 2002–03 Sussex County Football League season was the 78th in the history of Sussex County Football League a football competition in England.

== Division One ==
Sussex County Football League Division One
- Season: 2002–03
- Champions: Burgess Hill Town
- Promoted: Burgess Hill Town
- Relegated: Peacehaven & Telscombe; Wick; Littlehampton Town
- Matches: 380
- Goals: 1,283 (3.38 per match)

Division One featured 18 clubs which competed in the division last season, along with two new clubs, promoted from Division Two:

- East Preston
- Shoreham

=== League table ===
Pos	Team	Pld	W	D	L	GF	GA	GD	Pts	Qualification or relegation
1	Burgess Hill Town	38	29	4	5	97	27	+70	91	Promoted to the Southern League Eastern Division
2	Whitehawk	38	22	4	12	79	41	+38	70	
3	Horsham YMCA	38	21	6	11	101	51	+50	69	
4	Chichester City United	38	20	9	9	79	51	+28	69	
5	Sidlesham	38	20	6	12	65	62	+3	66	
6	Southwick	38	18	6	14	67	50	+17	60	
7	Ringmer	38	17	9	12	55	56	−1	60	
8	Hassocks	38	16	8	14	67	65	+2	56	
9	Pagham	38	16	7	15	69	52	+17	55	
10	East Preston	38	16	6	16	63	66	−3	54	
11	Selsey	38	14	11	13	59	44	+15	53	
12	Redhill	38	16	5	17	53	62	−9	53	
13	Sidley United	38	15	6	17	55	51	+4	51	
14	Three Bridges	38	14	7	17	88	83	+5	49	
15	Hailsham Town	38	13	8	17	54	60	−6	47	
16	Shoreham	38	13	6	19	54	69	−15	45	
17	Arundel	38	11	11	16	50	65	−15	44	
18	Peacehaven & Telscombe	38	9	5	24	43	95	−52	32	Relegated to Division Two
19	Wick	38	7	5	26	51	123	−72	26	Relegated to Division Two
20	Littlehampton Town	38	4	9	25	34	110	−76	21	Relegated to Division Two

Source: nonleaguematters
Rules for classification: 1) points; 2) goal difference; 3) number of goals scored.

== Division Two ==
Sussex County Football League Division Two
- Season: 2002–03
- Champions: Rye & Iden United
- Promoted: Rye & Iden United; Eastbourne Town; East Grinstead Town
- Matches: 306
- Goals: 1,013 (3.31 per match)

Division Two featured 14 clubs which competed in the division last season, along with four new clubs.

- Clubs relegated from Division One:
  - Eastbourne United
  - Saltdean United
- Clubs promoted from Division Three:
  - Pease Pottage Village
  - Steyning Town

=== League table ===
Pos	Team	Pld	W	D	L	GF	GA	GD	Pts	Qualification or relegation
1	Rye & Iden United	34	27	4	3	77	35	+42	85	Promoted to Division One
2	Eastbourne Town	34	25	7	2	97	28	+69	82	Promoted to Division One
3	East Grinstead Town	34	17	12	5	67	39	+28	63	Promoted to Division One
4	Oakwood	34	17	5	12	70	55	+15	56	
5	Saltdean United	34	15	6	13	70	55	+15	51	
6	Westfield	34	13	10	11	54	53	+1	49	
7	Wealden	34	14	6	14	64	60	+4	48	
8	Eastbourne United	34	14	6	14	63	60	+3	48	Merged into Eastbourne United Association
9	Lancing	34	12	11	11	47	49	−2	47	
10	Steyning Town	34	13	7	14	47	43	+4	46	
11	Shinewater Association	34	13	7	14	46	59	−13	46	Merged into Eastbourne United Association
12	Seaford	34	11	7	16	51	51	0	40	
13	Broadbridge Heath	34	11	5	18	54	74	−20	38	
14	Worthing United	34	11	5	18	41	64	−23	38	
15	Crawley Down	34	9	10	15	43	51	−8	37	
16	Mile Oak	34	9	6	19	47	74	−27	33	
17	Pease Pottage Village	34	9	4	21	38	79	−41	31	
18	Oving	34	5	4	25	37	84	−47	19	Resigned from the league

Source: nonleaguematters
Rules for classification: 1) points; 2) goal difference; 3) number of goals scored.

== Division Three ==
Sussex County Football League Division Three
- Season: 2002–03
- Champions: Midhurst & Easebourne
- Promoted: Midhurst & Easebourne; Haywards Heath Town
- Matches: 240
- Goals: 793 (3.3 per match)

Division Three featured eleven clubs which competed in the division last season, along with four new clubs:

- Bosham, relegated from Division Two
- Midhurst & Easebourne, joined from the West Sussex League
- St Francis Rangers, formed as merger of St Francis and Ansty Rangers
- Storrington, relegated from Division Two

Also, Bexhill Town changed name to Bexhill United.

=== League table ===
Pos	Team	Pld	W	D	L	GF	GA	GD	Pts	Qualification or relegation
1	Midhurst & Easebourne	28	20	4	4	80	26	+54	64	Promoted to Division Two
2	Haywards Heath Town	28	17	9	2	76	31	+45	60	Promoted to Division Two
3	Crowborough Athletic	28	18	4	6	87	32	+55	58	
4	Franklands Village	28	14	8	6	48	30	+18	50	
5	Ifield	28	13	5	10	47	50	−3	44	
6	St Francis Rangers	28	12	7	9	60	52	+8	43	
7	Newhaven	28	12	5	11	58	54	+4	41	
8	Forest	28	10	6	12	56	55	+1	36	
9	Lingfield	28	11	3	14	38	65	−27	36	
10	Bexhill United	28	10	5	13	53	56	−3	35	
11	Hurstpierpoint	28	8	8	12	37	44	−7	32	
12	Storrington	28	9	4	15	53	59	−6	31	
13	Upper Beeding	28	5	8	15	31	61	−30	23	
14	Bosham	28	6	3	19	30	102	−72	21	
15	Uckfield Town	28	5	1	22	39	76	−37	16	

Source: nonleaguematters
Rules for classification: 1) points; 2) goal difference; 3) number of goals scored.
