= 1961–62 Sussex County Football League =

Sussex County Football League
- Season: 1961–62
- Champions: Whitehawk

The 1961–62 Sussex County Football League season was the 37th in the history of the competition.

Division 1 increased to seventeen teams with Hastings Rangers being promoted from Division 2, Haywards Heath also joined Division 1 from leaving the Metropolitan League. Division 2 was remained at sixteen teams again, from which the winner would be promoted into Division 1. LEC Sports left Division 2 and were replaced by Selsey.

== Division One ==
The division featured 17 clubs, 15 which competed in the last season, along with two new clubs:

- Hastings Rangers, promoted from last season's Division Two
- Haywards Heath, joined from Metropolitan League

=== League table ===
Division One
- Season: 1961–62
- Champions: Whitehawk
- Relegated: Old Varndeanians
- Matches played: 272
- Goals scored: 1,280 (4.71 per match)

Pos	Team	Pld	W	D	L	GF	GA	GR	Pts	Qualification or relegation
1	Whitehawk	32	24	3	5	127	49	2.592	51	
2	Chichester City	32	23	3	6	132	60	2.200	49	
3	Lewes	32	17	8	7	86	53	1.623	42	
4	Bognor Regis Town	32	16	8	8	81	54	1.500	40	
5	Rye United	32	17	5	10	78	70	1.114	39	
6	Newhaven	32	12	10	10	70	88	0.795	34	
7	Littlehampton Town	32	13	6	13	66	85	0.776	32	
8	Haywards Heath	32	13	5	14	75	78	0.962	31	
9	Arundel	32	12	6	14	68	70	0.971	30	
10	APV Athletic	32	13	4	15	74	84	0.881	30	
11	Wigmore Athletic	32	12	5	15	61	87	0.701	29	
12	Lancing	32	11	6	15	77	78	0.987	28	
13	East Grinstead	32	11	6	15	65	68	0.956	28	
14	Hastings Rangers	32	8	8	16	68	85	0.800	24	
15	Bexhill Town Athletic	32	10	1	21	67	94	0.713	21	
16	Sidley United	32	8	4	20	52	93	0.559	20	
17	Old Varndeanians	32	5	6	21	33	84	0.393	16	Relegated to Division Two

Source: Non-League Matters
Rules for classification: 1) points; 2) goal difference; 3) number of goals scored.
The points system until the 1982–83 season: 2 points for a win, 1 point for a draw and 0 points for losing.

== Division Two ==
The division featured 16 clubs, 14 which competed in the last season, along with two new clubs:

- Shoreham, relegated from last season's Division One
- Selsey

=== League table ===
Division Two
- Season: 1961–62
- Champions: Shoreham
- Promoted: Shoreham
- Matches played: 240
- Goals scored: 1,242 (5.18 per match)

Pos	Team	Pld	W	D	L	GF	GA	GR	Pts	Qualification or relegation
1	Shoreham	30	27	1	2	138	32	4.313	55	Promoted to Division One
2	Selsey	30	25	1	4	123	52	2.365	51	
3	Battle Rangers	30	23	3	4	128	43	2.977	49	
4	Horsham YMCA	30	19	5	6	85	67	1.269	43	
5	Southwick	30	19	3	8	124	58	2.138	41	
6	Three Bridges United	30	14	5	11	82	77	1.065	33	
7	Burgess Hill	30	14	2	14	72	71	1.014	30	
8	Seaford Town	30	13	3	14	81	85	0.953	29	
9	Brighton Old Grammarians	30	12	3	15	78	85	0.918	27	
10	Goldstone	30	8	9	13	61	84	0.726	25	
11	Uckfield Town	30	8	7	15	61	96	0.635	23	
12	Brighton North End	30	8	5	17	54	71	0.761	21	
13	Hailsham Town	30	9	3	18	36	76	0.474	21	Left the league
14	Portslade	30	4	5	21	37	120	0.308	13	
15	Hastings & St Leonards	30	4	4	22	37	102	0.363	12	
16	Moulsecoomb Rovers	30	1	5	24	45	123	0.366	7	

Source: Non-League Matters
Rules for classification: 1) points; 2) goal difference; 3) number of goals scored.
The points system until the 1982–83 season: 2 points for a win, 1 point for a draw and 0 points for losing.
