= 2004–05 Sussex County Football League =

The 2004–05 Sussex County Football League season was the 80th in the history of Sussex County Football League a football competition in England.

== Division One ==
Sussex County Football League Division One
- Season: 2004–05
- Champions: Horsham YMCA
- Relegated: East Grinstead Town; Pagham; Sidlesham
- Matches: 380
- Goals: 1,242 (3.27 per match)

Division One featured 17 clubs which competed in the division last season, along with three new clubs, promoted from Division Two:

- Eastbourne United Association
- Littlehampton Town
- Worthing United

=== League table ===
| Pos | Team | Pld | W | D | L | GF | GA | GD | Pts | Qualification or relegation |
|---|---|---|---|---|---|---|---|---|---|---|
| 1 | Horsham YMCA | 38 | 28 | 5 | 5 | 87 | 33 | +54 | 89 | |
| 2 | Rye & Iden United | 38 | 23 | 5 | 10 | 80 | 47 | +33 | 74 | |
| 3 | Whitehawk | 38 | 21 | 10 | 7 | 71 | 40 | +31 | 73 | |
| 4 | Littlehampton Town | 38 | 21 | 2 | 15 | 60 | 53 | +7 | 65 | |
| 5 | Eastbourne United Association | 38 | 18 | 8 | 12 | 74 | 61 | +13 | 62 | |
| 6 | Ringmer | 38 | 16 | 12 | 10 | 55 | 38 | +17 | 60 | |
| 7 | Three Bridges | 38 | 15 | 11 | 12 | 71 | 51 | +20 | 56 | |
| 8 | Hassocks | 38 | 15 | 9 | 14 | 69 | 61 | +8 | 54 | |
| 9 | Arundel | 38 | 15 | 7 | 16 | 69 | 57 | +12 | 52 | |
| 10 | Eastbourne Town | 38 | 14 | 10 | 14 | 56 | 57 | −1 | 52 | |
| 11 | East Preston | 38 | 13 | 11 | 14 | 70 | 59 | +11 | 50 | |
| 12 | Hailsham Town | 38 | 14 | 8 | 16 | 58 | 76 | −18 | 50 | |
| 13 | Redhill | 38 | 12 | 11 | 15 | 55 | 65 | −10 | 47 | |
| 14 | Worthing United | 38 | 11 | 11 | 16 | 59 | 61 | −2 | 44 | |
| 15 | Sidley United | 38 | 12 | 8 | 18 | 63 | 76 | −13 | 44 | |
| 16 | Chichester City United | 38 | 9 | 16 | 13 | 63 | 62 | +1 | 43 | |
| 17 | Southwick | 38 | 11 | 9 | 18 | 46 | 63 | −17 | 42 | |
| 18 | East Grinstead Town | 38 | 11 | 8 | 19 | 48 | 68 | −20 | 41 | Relegated to Division Two |
| 19 | Pagham | 38 | 8 | 10 | 20 | 45 | 98 | −53 | 34 | Relegated to Division Two |
| 20 | Sidlesham | 38 | 6 | 3 | 29 | 43 | 116 | −73 | 21 | Relegated to Division Two |

Source: nonleaguematters
Rules for classification: 1) points; 2) goal difference; 3) number of goals scored.

== Division Two ==
Sussex County Football League Division Two
- Season: 2004–05
- Champions: Crowborough Athletic
- Promoted: Crowborough Athletic; Wick; Shoreham
- Relegated: Peacehaven & Telscombe; Pease Pottage Village
- Matches: 306
- Goals: 1,043 (3.41 per match)

Division Two featured 14 clubs which competed in the division last season, along with four new clubs.

- Clubs relegated from Division One:
  - Selsey
  - Shoreham
- Clubs promoted from Division Three:
  - Crowborough Athletic
  - St Francis Rangers

=== League table ===
| Pos | Team | Pld | W | D | L | GF | GA | GD | Pts | Qualification or relegation |
|---|---|---|---|---|---|---|---|---|---|---|
| 1 | Crowborough Athletic | 34 | 23 | 7 | 4 | 76 | 42 | +34 | 76 | Promoted to Division One |
| 2 | Wick | 34 | 21 | 5 | 8 | 58 | 31 | +27 | 68 | Promoted to Division One |
| 3 | Shoreham | 34 | 20 | 7 | 7 | 80 | 49 | +31 | 67 | Promoted to Division One |
| 4 | St Francis Rangers | 34 | 20 | 3 | 11 | 61 | 35 | +26 | 63 | |
| 5 | Wealden | 34 | 19 | 3 | 12 | 82 | 47 | +35 | 60 | |
| 6 | Seaford | 34 | 15 | 9 | 10 | 70 | 59 | +11 | 54 | |
| 7 | Westfield | 34 | 16 | 6 | 12 | 51 | 47 | +4 | 54 | |
| 8 | Oakwood | 34 | 15 | 4 | 15 | 66 | 63 | +3 | 49 | |
| 9 | Midhurst & Easebourne | 34 | 14 | 7 | 13 | 57 | 60 | −3 | 49 | |
| 10 | Crawley Down | 34 | 15 | 2 | 17 | 41 | 52 | −11 | 47 | |
| 11 | Mile Oak | 34 | 13 | 7 | 14 | 57 | 61 | −4 | 46 | |
| 12 | Broadbridge Heath | 34 | 14 | 4 | 16 | 55 | 61 | −6 | 46 | |
| 13 | Lancing | 34 | 14 | 2 | 18 | 56 | 71 | −15 | 44 | |
| 14 | Selsey | 34 | 12 | 6 | 16 | 59 | 61 | −2 | 42 | |
| 15 | Saltdean United | 34 | 9 | 7 | 18 | 43 | 68 | −25 | 34 | |
| 16 | Steyning Town | 34 | 7 | 12 | 15 | 46 | 60 | −14 | 33 | |
| 17 | Peacehaven & Telscombe | 34 | 5 | 4 | 25 | 48 | 93 | −45 | 19 | Relegated to Division Three |
| 18 | Pease Pottage Village | 34 | 5 | 3 | 26 | 37 | 83 | −46 | 18 | Relegated to Division Three |

Source: nonleaguematters
Rules for classification: 1) points; 2) goal difference; 3) number of goals scored.

== Division Three ==
Sussex County Football League Division Three
- Season: 2004–05
- Champions: Storrington
- Promoted: Storrington; Bexhill United
- Matches: 156
- Goals: 569 (3.65 per match)

Division Three featured eleven clubs which competed in the division last season, along with two new clubs:

- Haywards Heath Town, relegated from Division Two
- Rustington, joined from the West Sussex League

=== League table ===
| Pos | Team | Pld | W | D | L | GF | GA | GD | Pts | Qualification or relegation |
|---|---|---|---|---|---|---|---|---|---|---|
| 1 | Storrington | 24 | 16 | 6 | 2 | 58 | 21 | +37 | 54 | Promoted to Division Two |
| 2 | Bexhill United | 24 | 16 | 3 | 5 | 64 | 33 | +31 | 51 | Promoted to Division Two |
| 3 | Lingfield | 24 | 13 | 4 | 7 | 55 | 47 | +8 | 43 | |
| 4 | Uckfield Town | 24 | 12 | 3 | 9 | 47 | 47 | 0 | 39 | |
| 5 | Wadhurst United | 24 | 11 | 5 | 8 | 52 | 33 | +19 | 38 | |
| 6 | Ifield Edwards | 24 | 11 | 3 | 10 | 49 | 43 | +6 | 36 | |
| 7 | Bosham | 24 | 10 | 6 | 8 | 45 | 39 | +6 | 36 | |
| 8 | Rustington | 24 | 9 | 7 | 8 | 40 | 43 | −3 | 34 | |
| 9 | Hurstpierpoint | 24 | 9 | 4 | 11 | 39 | 40 | −1 | 31 | |
| 10 | Forest | 24 | 7 | 5 | 12 | 25 | 36 | −11 | 26 | |
| 11 | Newhaven | 24 | 6 | 3 | 15 | 29 | 50 | −21 | 21 | |
| 12 | Haywards Heath Town | 24 | 5 | 6 | 13 | 35 | 61 | −26 | 21 | |
| 13 | Upper Beeding | 24 | 1 | 5 | 18 | 31 | 76 | −45 | 8 | |

Source: nonleaguematters
Rules for classification: 1) points; 2) goal difference; 3) number of goals scored.
