= 1952–53 Sussex County Football League =

Sussex County Football League
- Season: 1952–53
- Champions: Shoreham

The 1952–53 Sussex County Football League season was the 28th in the history of the competition.

The league increased to two Divisions, Division 1 and Division 2. Division 1 featured thirteen of last seasons teams with Whitehawk & Manor Farm Old Boys joining the league. Division 2 featured twelve teams from which the winners would be promoted into Division 1.

== Division One ==
The division featured 14 clubs, 13 which competed in the last season, along with one new club:

- Whitehawk & Manor Farm Old Boys

=== League table ===
Division One
- Season: 1952–53
- Champions: Shoreham
- Matches played: 182
- Goals scored: 828 (4.55 per match)

Pos	Team	Pld	W	D	L	GF	GA	GR	Pts
1	Shoreham	26	18	2	6	80	45	1.778	38
2	Brighton Old Grammarians	26	14	7	5	69	48	1.438	35
3	Whitehawk & Manor Farm Old Boys	26	15	4	7	72	49	1.469	34
4	Arundel	26	15	3	8	59	34	1.735	33
5	Eastbourne United	26	13	4	9	77	49	1.571	30
6	Newhaven	26	12	4	10	59	43	1.372	28
7	Chichester	26	12	4	10	62	58	1.069	28
8	Bexhill Town Athletic	26	12	3	11	42	50	0.840	27
9	Lancing Athletic	26	10	6	10	55	53	1.038	26
10	Bognor Regis Town	26	11	4	11	67	68	0.985	26
11	East Grinstead	26	9	6	11	65	66	0.985	24
12	Lewes	26	7	5	14	47	75	0.627	19
13	Littlehampton Town	26	4	4	18	44	78	0.564	12
14	Crawley	26	1	2	23	30	112	0.268	4

Source: Non-League Matters
Rules for classification: 1) points; 2) goal difference; 3) number of goals scored.
The points system until the 1982–83 season: 2 points for a win, 1 point for a draw and 0 points for losing.

== Division Two ==
The division featured 12 clubs.

=== League table ===
Division Two
- Season: 1952–53
- Champions: Wigmore Athletic
- Promoted: Wigmore Athletic
- Matches played: 132
- Goals scored: 741 (5.61 per match)

Pos	Team	Pld	W	D	L	GF	GA	GR	Pts	Qualification or relegation
1	Wigmore Athletic	22	19	1	2	107	27	3.963	39	Promoted to Division One
2	Goldstone	22	16	0	6	77	38	2.026	32	
3	Rye United	22	11	3	8	59	44	1.341	25	
4	Hastings Rangers	22	10	5	7	60	50	1.200	25	
5	Cuckfield	22	12	1	9	65	55	1.182	25	
6	Sidley United	22	10	3	9	72	61	1.180	23	
7	Hove White Rovers	22	9	3	10	53	63	0.841	21	
8	Seaford Town	22	7	5	10	48	55	0.873	19	
9	Pulborough	22	7	5	10	64	80	0.800	19	
10	Three Bridges	22	6	3	13	51	86	0.593	15	
11	Moulsecoomb Rovers	22	4	3	15	49	80	0.613	11	
12	Hastings & St Leonards	22	3	4	15	36	102	0.353	10	

Source: Non-League Matters
Rules for classification: 1) points; 2) goal difference; 3) number of goals scored.
The points system until the 1982–83 season: 2 points for a win, 1 point for a draw and 0 points for losing.
