= 1920–21 Sussex County Football League =

Sussex County Football League
- Season: 1920–21
- Champions: Worthing
- Matches played: 132
- Goals scored: 526 (3.98 per match)

The 1920–21 Sussex County Football League season was the first in the history of the Sussex County League

== League ==
The league featured 12 teams. Eastbourne were also playing in the Southern Amateur League, and opted to leave the Sussex County League at the end of the season.

=== League table ===
Pos	Team	Pld	W	D	L	GF	GA	GR	Pts	Qualification or relegation
1	Worthing	22	17	3	2	65	16	4.063	37	
2	Vernon Athletic	22	16	4	2	71	20	3.550	36	
3	Eastbourne	22	13	6	3	63	31	2.032	32	Left the league
4	Brighton & Hove Amateurs	22	9	6	7	44	40	1.100	24	
5	Corps of Signals	22	9	4	9	62	44	1.409	22	
6	Rock-A-Nore	22	8	5	9	33	41	0.805	21	Left the league
7	Chichester	22	9	2	11	35	52	0.673	20	
8	Newhaven	22	8	2	12	37	48	0.771	18	
9	Shoreham	22	6	5	11	32	36	0.889	17	
10	Southwick	22	7	3	12	32	55	0.582	17	
11	Lewes	22	4	7	11	29	52	0.558	15	
12	East Grinstead	22	1	3	18	23	91	0.253	5	

Source: Non-League Matters
Rules for classification: 1) points; 2) goal difference; 3) number of goals scored.
The points system until the 1982–83 season: 2 points for a win, 1 point for a draw and 0 points for losing.

=== Stadia and locations ===
Map showing the location of teams in the 1920–21 Sussex County League

Team	Location	Stadium
Brighton & Hove Amateurs	Brighton	Unknown
Chichester	Chichester	Oaklands Park
Corps of Signals	Maresfield	Maresfield Park
East Grinstead Town	East Grinstead	West Street
Eastbourne	Eastbourne	The Saffrons
Rock-a-Nore	Hastings	The Pilot Field
Lewes	Lewes	The Dripping Pan
Newhaven	Newhaven	The Trafalgar Ground
Shoreham	Shoreham-by-Sea	Middle Road
Southwick	Southwick	Old Barn Way
Vernon Athletic	Brighton	Preston Park
Worthing	Worthing	Woodside Road
