= 1998–99 Sussex County Football League =

The 1998–99 Sussex County Football League season was the 74th in the history of Sussex County Football League a football competition in England.

== Division One ==
Sussex County Football League Division One
- Season: 1998–99
- Champions: Burgess Hill Town
- Relegated: Hailsham Town; Broadbridge Heath
- Matches: 380
- Goals: 1,221 (3.21 per match)

Division One featured 17 clubs which competed in the division last season, along with three new clubs, promoted from Division Two:

- Broadbridge Heath
- East Preston
- Eastbourne United

=== League table ===
| Pos | Team | Pld | W | D | L | GF | GA | GD | Pts | Qualification or relegation |
|---|---|---|---|---|---|---|---|---|---|---|
| 1 | Burgess Hill Town | 38 | 28 | 5 | 5 | 106 | 24 | +82 | 89 | |
| 2 | Saltdean United | 38 | 26 | 8 | 4 | 100 | 35 | +65 | 86 | |
| 3 | Horsham YMCA | 38 | 24 | 7 | 7 | 97 | 50 | +47 | 79 | |
| 4 | Langney Sports | 38 | 20 | 6 | 12 | 69 | 43 | +26 | 66 | |
| 5 | Shoreham | 38 | 19 | 8 | 11 | 80 | 57 | +23 | 65 | |
| 6 | Wick | 38 | 18 | 7 | 13 | 65 | 49 | +16 | 61 | |
| 7 | East Preston | 38 | 18 | 6 | 14 | 69 | 57 | +12 | 60 | |
| 8 | Eastbourne United | 38 | 17 | 8 | 13 | 59 | 51 | +8 | 59 | |
| 9 | Pagham | 38 | 16 | 11 | 11 | 42 | 39 | +3 | 59 | |
| 10 | Eastbourne Town | 38 | 14 | 12 | 12 | 61 | 62 | −1 | 54 | |
| 11 | Redhill | 38 | 14 | 11 | 13 | 79 | 60 | +19 | 53 | |
| 12 | Portfield | 38 | 12 | 13 | 13 | 62 | 66 | −4 | 49 | |
| 13 | Hassocks | 38 | 13 | 7 | 18 | 51 | 51 | 0 | 46 | |
| 14 | Whitehawk | 38 | 11 | 10 | 17 | 50 | 61 | −11 | 43 | |
| 15 | Chichester City | 38 | 10 | 11 | 17 | 44 | 66 | −22 | 41 | |
| 16 | Littlehampton Town | 38 | 10 | 7 | 21 | 38 | 87 | −49 | 37 | |
| 17 | Ringmer | 38 | 8 | 11 | 19 | 35 | 64 | −29 | 35 | |
| 18 | Selsey | 38 | 7 | 8 | 23 | 42 | 93 | −51 | 29 | |
| 19 | Hailsham Town | 38 | 7 | 4 | 27 | 40 | 101 | −61 | 25 | Relegated to Division Two |
| 20 | Broadbridge Heath | 38 | 4 | 8 | 26 | 32 | 105 | −73 | 20 | Relegated to Division Two |

Source: nonleaguematters
Rules for classification: 1) points; 2) goal difference; 3) number of goals scored.

== Division Two ==
Sussex County Football League Division Two
- Season: 1998–99
- Champions: Sidley United
- Promoted: Sidley United; Three Bridges
- Relegated: Crowborough Athletic; Newhaven
- Matches: 306
- Goals: 989 (3.23 per match)

Division Two featured 13 clubs which competed in the division last season, along with five new clubs.

- Clubs relegated from Division One:
  - Arundel
  - Mile Oak
  - Peacehaven & Telscombe
- Clubs promoted from Division Three:
  - Lingfield
  - Storrington

=== League table ===
| Pos | Team | Pld | W | D | L | GF | GA | GD | Pts | Qualification or relegation |
|---|---|---|---|---|---|---|---|---|---|---|
| 1 | Sidley United | 34 | 26 | 4 | 4 | 72 | 23 | +49 | 82 | Promoted to Division One |
| 2 | Three Bridges | 34 | 23 | 4 | 7 | 74 | 35 | +39 | 73 | Promoted to Division One |
| 3 | Crawley Down Village | 34 | 22 | 7 | 5 | 66 | 35 | +31 | 73 | |
| 4 | Southwick | 34 | 18 | 9 | 7 | 84 | 34 | +50 | 63 | |
| 5 | Mile Oak | 34 | 18 | 8 | 8 | 63 | 49 | +14 | 62 | |
| 6 | Storrington | 34 | 18 | 6 | 10 | 54 | 30 | +24 | 60 | |
| 7 | Sidlesham | 34 | 17 | 6 | 11 | 70 | 38 | +32 | 57 | |
| 8 | Arundel | 34 | 16 | 9 | 9 | 57 | 43 | +14 | 57 | |
| 9 | Lancing | 34 | 10 | 11 | 13 | 50 | 55 | −5 | 41 | |
| 10 | Lingfield | 34 | 10 | 9 | 15 | 54 | 56 | −2 | 39 | |
| 11 | Shinewater Association | 34 | 10 | 9 | 15 | 46 | 58 | −12 | 39 | |
| 12 | Peacehaven & Telscombe | 34 | 8 | 12 | 14 | 50 | 67 | −17 | 36 | |
| 13 | East Grinstead Town | 34 | 10 | 5 | 19 | 50 | 78 | −28 | 35 | |
| 14 | Worthing United | 34 | 8 | 9 | 17 | 48 | 73 | −25 | 33 | |
| 15 | Oakwood | 34 | 10 | 3 | 21 | 37 | 72 | −35 | 33 | |
| 16 | Withdean | 34 | 5 | 12 | 17 | 43 | 67 | −24 | 27 | |
| 17 | Crowborough Athletic | 34 | 7 | 6 | 21 | 45 | 80 | −35 | 27 | Relegated to Division Three |
| 18 | Newhaven | 34 | 2 | 7 | 25 | 26 | 96 | −70 | 13 | Relegated to Division Three |

Source: nonleaguematters
Rules for classification: 1) points; 2) goal difference; 3) number of goals scored.

== Division Three ==
Sussex County Football League Division Three
- Season: 1998–99
- Champions: Oving Social Club
- Promoted: Oving Social Club; Westfield
- Relegated: Buxted; Midhurst & Easebourne
- Matches: 240
- Goals: 817 (3.4 per match)

Division Three featured 13 clubs which competed in the division last season, along with three new clubs:

- Bexhill Town, relegated from Division Two
- Midhurst & Easebourne, relegated from Division Two
- Wealden

=== League table ===
| Pos | Team | Pld | W | D | L | GF | GA | GD | Pts | Qualification or relegation |
|---|---|---|---|---|---|---|---|---|---|---|
| 1 | Oving Social Club | 30 | 25 | 2 | 3 | 72 | 20 | +52 | 74 (Note: Oving Social Club were deducted three points.) | Promoted to Division Two |
| 2 | Westfield | 30 | 22 | 4 | 4 | 75 | 26 | +49 | 70 | Promoted to Division Two |
| 3 | St Francis Hospital | 30 | 21 | 4 | 5 | 59 | 26 | +33 | 67 | |
| 4 | Wealden | 30 | 14 | 9 | 7 | 46 | 35 | +11 | 51 | |
| 5 | Uckfield Town | 30 | 15 | 3 | 12 | 60 | 43 | +17 | 48 | |
| 6 | Franklands Village | 30 | 11 | 9 | 10 | 47 | 38 | +9 | 42 | |
| 7 | Ifield | 30 | 12 | 4 | 14 | 61 | 78 | −17 | 40 | |
| 8 | Steyning Town | 30 | 11 | 4 | 15 | 49 | 54 | −5 | 37 | |
| 9 | Hurstpierpoint | 30 | 10 | 4 | 16 | 43 | 51 | −8 | 37 (Note: Hurstpierpoint were awarded three points.) | |
| 10 | Bexhill Town | 30 | 11 | 4 | 15 | 43 | 66 | −23 | 37 | |
| 11 | Ansty Rangers | 30 | 9 | 9 | 12 | 52 | 46 | +6 | 36 | |
| 12 | Forest | 30 | 10 | 6 | 14 | 46 | 57 | −11 | 36 | |
| 13 | Royal & Sun Alliance | 30 | 7 | 8 | 15 | 52 | 81 | −29 | 29 | |
| 14 | Haywards Heath Town | 30 | 6 | 8 | 16 | 35 | 53 | −18 | 26 | |
| 15 | Buxted | 30 | 4 | 10 | 16 | 32 | 60 | −28 | 22 | Resigned from the league |
| 16 | Midhurst & Easebourne | 30 | 6 | 4 | 20 | 45 | 83 | −38 | 22 | Relegated to the West Sussex League |

Source: nonleaguematters
Rules for classification: 1) points; 2) goal difference; 3) number of goals scored.
