= 1921–22 Sussex County Football League =

Sussex County Football League
- Season: 1921–22
- Champions: Worthing
- Matches played: 132
- Goals scored: 493 (3.73 per match)

The 1921–22 Sussex County Football League season was the second in the history of the competition.

== League table ==
The league featured 12 clubs, 10 which competed in the last season, along with two new clubs:

- Eastbourne Royal Engineers
- Hastings and St Leonards

=== League table ===
Pos	Team	Pld	W	D	L	GF	GA	GR	Pts	Qualification or relegation
1	Worthing	22	19	1	2	52	13	4.000	39	
2	Hastings and St Leonards	22	16	1	5	64	26	2.462	33	
3	Royal Corps of Signals	22	14	4	4	66	20	3.300	32	
4	Vernon Athletic	22	13	2	7	47	35	1.343	28	
5	Eastbourne Royal Engineers	22	10	4	8	60	39	1.538	24	Left the league
6	Lewes	22	11	2	9	46	41	1.122	24	
7	Brighton & Hove Amateurs	22	8	3	11	32	43	0.744	19	Left the league
8	Chichester	22	8	1	13	26	61	0.426	17	
9	Southwick	22	7	2	13	33	52	0.635	16	
10	Newhaven	22	5	4	13	26	53	0.491	12 (Note: Newhaven deducted 2 points, reasons unknown as yet.)	
11	East Grinstead	22	2	6	14	25	56	0.446	10	Left the league
12	Shoreham	22	3	2	17	16	54	0.296	8	

Source: Non-League Matters
Rules for classification: 1) points; 2) goal difference; 3) number of goals scored.
The points system until the 1982–83 season: 2 points for a win, 1 point for a draw and 0 points for losing.
