= 1922–23 Sussex County Football League =

Association football league season

Sussex County Football League
- Season: 1922–23
- Champions: Vernon Athletic
- Matches played: 110
- Goals scored: 424 (3.85 per match)

The 1922–23 Sussex County Football League season was the third in the history of the competition.

== League table ==
The league featured 11 clubs, 9 which competed in the last season, along with two new clubs:

- Eastbourne Old Comrades
- Hove

=== League table ===
Pos	Team	Pld	W	D	L	GF	GA	GR	Pts
1	Vernon Athletic	20	14	3	3	61	28	2.179	31
2	Eastbourne Old Comrades	20	12	2	6	45	32	1.406	26
3	Worthing	20	10	4	6	50	26	1.923	24
4	Southwick	20	9	3	8	41	32	1.281	21
5	Royal Corps of Signals	20	8	4	8	42	36	1.167	20
6	Shoreham	20	9	1	10	37	38	0.974	19
7	Newhaven	20	8	3	9	31	48	0.646	19
8	Hastings and St Leonards	20	9	1	10	29	45	0.644	19
9	Hove	20	7	2	11	36	47	0.766	16
10	Chichester	20	6	1	13	29	48	0.604	13
11	Lewes	20	6	0	14	23	44	0.523	12

Source: Non-League Matters
Rules for classification: 1) points; 2) goal difference; 3) number of goals scored.
The points system until the 1982–83 season: 2 points for a win, 1 point for a draw and 0 points for losing.
