= 1923–24 Sussex County Football League =

Sussex County Football League
- Season: 1923–24
- Champions: Royal Corps of Signals
- Matches played: 132
- Goals scored: 566 (4.29 per match)

The 1923–24 Sussex County Football League season was the fourth in the history of the competition and was won by Royal Corps of Signals.

== League table ==
The league featured 12 clubs, 11 which competed in the last season, along with one new club:

- Allen West

=== League table ===
Pos	Team	Pld	W	D	L	GF	GA	GR	Pts
1	Royal Corps of Signals	22	14	3	5	68	28	2.429	31
2	Southwick	22	13	4	5	57	33	1.727	30
3	Hastings and St Leonards	22	12	4	6	53	30	1.767	28
4	Shoreham	22	10	7	5	44	31	1.419	27
5	Allen West	22	12	3	7	42	45	0.933	27
6	Eastbourne Old Comrades	22	10	6	6	62	47	1.319	26
7	Worthing	22	11	2	9	43	41	1.049	24
8	Hove	22	9	3	10	44	45	0.978	21
9	Chichester	22	7	3	12	43	52	0.827	17
10	Vernon Athletic	22	6	3	13	42	58	0.724	15
11	Newhaven	22	6	2	14	40	66	0.606	14
12	Lewes	22	2	0	20	28	90	0.311	4

Source: Non-League Matters
Rules for classification: 1) points; 2) goal difference; 3) number of goals scored.
The points system until the 1982–83 season: 2 points for a win, 1 point for a draw and 0 points for losing.
