= 1924–25 Sussex County Football League =

Sussex County Football League
- Season: 1924–25
- Champions: Royal Corps of Signals
- Matches played: 156
- Goals scored: 688 (4.41 per match)

The 1924–25 Sussex County Football League season was the fifth in the history of the competition.

== League table ==
The league featured 13 clubs, 12 which competed in the last season, along with one new club:

- East Grinstead

=== League table ===
Pos	Team	Pld	W	D	L	GF	GA	GR	Pts	Qualification or relegation
1	Royal Corps of Signals	24	18	2	4	55	23	2.391	38	Left the league
2	Lewes	24	17	2	5	103	47	2.191	36	
3	Southwick	24	14	4	6	72	41	1.756	32	
4	Hastings	24	13	5	6	71	39	1.821	31	
5	Hove	24	11	7	6	47	37	1.270	29	
6	Newhaven	24	11	5	8	56	41	1.366	27	
7	Worthing	24	11	4	9	47	40	1.175	26	
8	Shoreham	24	9	6	9	60	43	1.395	24	
9	Eastbourne Old Comrades	24	11	1	12	51	55	0.927	23	
10	Allen West	24	5	7	12	24	55	0.436	17	
11	Vernon Athletic	24	5	3	16	38	81	0.469	13	
12	Chichester	24	3	2	19	34	86	0.395	8	
13	East Grinstead	24	3	2	19	30	100	0.300	8	

Source: Non-League Matters
Rules for classification: 1) points; 2) goal difference; 3) number of goals scored.
The points system until the 1982–83 season: 2 points for a win, 1 point for a draw and 0 points for losing.
