= 1925–26 Sussex County Football League =

Sussex County Football League
- Season: 1925–26
- Champions: Southwick
- Matches played: 132
- Goals scored: 658 (4.98 per match)

The 1925–26 Sussex County Football League season was the sixth in the history of the competition.

== League table ==
The league featured 12 clubs which competed in the last season, no new clubs joined the league this season.

=== League table ===
Pos	Team	Pld	W	D	L	GF	GA	GR	Pts	Qualification or relegation
1	Southwick	22	16	3	3	86	33	2.606	35	
2	Hastings	22	16	1	5	83	37	2.243	33	
3	Hove	22	11	4	7	53	26	2.038	26	
4	Worthing	22	10	5	7	55	37	1.486	25	
5	Eastbourne Old Comrades	22	10	5	7	52	43	1.209	25	
6	Lewes	22	10	3	9	65	62	1.048	23	
7	Chichester	22	8	5	9	57	64	0.891	21	
8	Allen West	22	8	3	11	45	60	0.750	19	
9	Vernon Athletic	22	8	3	11	33	49	0.673	19	
10	Shoreham	22	7	4	11	31	59	0.525	18	
11	Newhaven	22	4	5	13	66	88	0.750	13	
12	East Grinstead	22	3	1	18	32	100	0.320	7	Left the League

Source: Non-League Matters
Rules for classification: 1) points; 2) goal difference; 3) number of goals scored.
The points system until the 1982–83 season: 2 points for a win, 1 point for a draw and 0 points for losing.
