= 1926–27 Sussex County Football League =

Sussex County Football League
- Season: 1926–27
- Champions: Worthing
- Matches played: 132
- Goals scored: 707 (5.36 per match)

The 1926–27 Sussex County Football League season was the seventh in the history of the competition.

== League table ==
The league featured 12 clubs, 11 which competed in the last season, along with one new club:

- Horsham

=== League table ===
Pos	Team	Pld	W	D	L	GF	GA	GR	Pts	Qualification or relegation
1	Worthing	22	17	2	3	59	19	3.105	36	
2	Eastbourne Old Comrades	22	15	2	5	61	37	1.649	32	
3	Southwick	22	14	3	5	70	39	1.795	31	
4	Lewes	22	14	3	5	68	50	1.360	31	
5	Hove	22	10	2	10	70	49	1.429	22	
6	Hastings	22	10	1	11	80	51	1.569	21	Left the League
7	Horsham	22	7	5	10	68	67	1.015	19	
8	Vernon Athletic	22	8	3	11	44	61	0.721	19	
9	Chichester	22	8	2	12	59	71	0.831	18	
10	Allen West	22	5	6	11	51	61	0.836	16	
11	Newhaven	22	5	4	13	45	77	0.584	14	
12	Shoreham	22	2	1	19	32	125	0.256	5	Left the League

Source: Non-League Matters
Rules for classification: 1) points; 2) goal difference; 3) number of goals scored.
The points system until the 1982–83 season: 2 points for a win, 1 point for a draw and 0 points for losing.
