= 1946–47 Sussex County Football League =

Sussex County Football League
- Season: 1946–47
- Champions: Horsham
- Matches played: 182
- Goals scored: 1,067 (5.86 per match)

The 1946–47 Sussex County Football League season was the 22nd in the history of the competition.

== League table ==
The league featured 14 clubs, 11 which competed in the last season, along with three new clubs:

- Chichester
- Bexhill Town Athletic
- Eastbourne Comrades

=== League table ===
Pos	Team	Pld	W	D	L	GF	GA	GR	Pts
1	Horsham	26	19	2	5	103	55	1.873	40
2	Littlehampton Town	26	16	4	6	82	49	1.673	36
3	East Grinstead	26	15	3	8	87	54	1.611	33
4	Worthing	26	16	1	9	89	70	1.271	33
5	Newhaven	26	14	3	9	65	69	0.942	31
6	Southwick	26	14	2	10	111	71	1.563	30
7	Lewes	26	13	3	10	60	68	0.882	29
8	Chichester	26	12	4	10	89	91	0.978	28
9	Bognor Regis	26	10	4	12	85	80	1.063	24
10	Haywards Heath	26	8	4	14	64	81	0.790	20
11	Bexhill Town Athletic	26	7	5	14	72	91	0.791	19
12	Shoreham	26	6	4	16	57	92	0.620	16
13	Hove	26	6	2	18	65	108	0.602	14
14	Eastbourne Comrades	26	2	7	17	38	88	0.432	11

Source: Non-League Matters
Rules for classification: 1) points; 2) goal difference; 3) number of goals scored.
The points system until the 1982–83 season: 2 points for a win, 1 point for a draw and 0 points for losing.
