= 1954–55 Sussex County Football League =

Sussex County Football League
- Season: 1954–55
- Champions: Eastbourne United

The 1954–55 Sussex County Football League season was the 30th in the history of the competition.

Division 1 featured now increased to seventeen teams with Hove White Rovers being promoted from Division 2 and Southwick re-joining. Division 2 featured eleven teams from which the winners would be promoted into Division 1.

== Division One ==
The division featured 17 clubs, 15 which competed in the last season, along with two new clubs:

- Hove White Rovers, promoted from last season's Division Two
- Southwick, joined from Metropolitan League

=== League table ===
Division One
- Season: 1954–55
- Champions: Eastbourne United
- Relegated: Crawley
- Matches played: 272
- Goals scored: 1,189 (4.37 per match)

Pos	Team	Pld	W	D	L	GF	GA	GR	Pts	Qualification or relegation
1	Eastbourne United	32	19	9	4	103	49	2.102	47	
2	Whitehawk & Manor Farm Old Boys	32	22	2	8	106	53	2.000	46	
3	East Grinstead	32	18	7	7	95	64	1.484	43	
4	Bognor Regis Town	32	17	5	10	71	54	1.315	39	
5	Newhaven	32	16	3	13	75	69	1.087	35	
6	Chichester City	32	16	1	15	82	83	0.988	33	
7	Hove White Rovers	32	13	6	13	66	64	1.031	32	
8	Littlehampton Town	32	14	4	14	69	73	0.945	32	
9	Brighton Old Grammarians	32	12	8	12	57	63	0.905	32	
10	Lewes	32	13	4	15	60	63	0.952	30	
11	Shoreham	32	11	5	16	68	82	0.829	27	
12	Bexhill Town Athletic	32	11	3	18	66	89	0.742	25	
13	Lancing Athletic	32	9	7	16	64	87	0.736	25	
14	Southwick	32	8	9	15	49	72	0.681	25	
15	Arundel	32	8	9	15	54	83	0.651	25	
16	Wigmore Athletic	32	9	6	17	57	71	0.803	24	
17	Crawley	32	10	4	18	47	70	0.671	24	Relegated to Division Two

Source: Non-League Matters
Rules for classification: 1) points; 2) goal difference; 3) number of goals scored.
The points system until the 1982–83 season: 2 points for a win, 1 point for a draw and 0 points for losing.

== Division Two ==
The division featured 11 clubs, 9 which competed in the last season, along with two new clubs:

- APV Athletic
- Chichester United

=== League table ===
Division Two
- Season: 1954–55
- Champions: Three Bridges United
- Promoted: Three Bridges United
- Matches played: 110
- Goals scored: 573 (5.21 per match)

Pos	Team	Pld	W	D	L	GF	GA	GR	Pts	Qualification or relegation
1	Three Bridges United	20	15	1	4	61	28	2.179	31	Promoted to Division One
2	Hastings Rangers	20	11	8	1	69	30	2.300	30	
3	Rye United	20	11	5	4	67	48	1.396	27	
4	Sidley United	20	11	2	7	50	34	1.471	24	
5	Moulsecoomb Rovers	20	10	3	7	58	51	1.137	23	
6	Cuckfield	20	9	4	7	61	49	1.245	22	
7	Chichester United	20	9	4	7	58	49	1.184	22	
8	Seaford Town	20	5	4	11	38	62	0.613	14	
9	Goldstone	20	6	1	13	44	66	0.667	13	
10	APV Athletic	20	2	4	14	31	84	0.369	8	
11	Hastings & St Leonards	20	2	2	16	36	72	0.500	6	

Source: Non-League Matters
Rules for classification: 1) points; 2) goal difference; 3) number of goals scored.
The points system until the 1982–83 season: 2 points for a win, 1 point for a draw and 0 points for losing.
