= 1934–35 Sussex County Football League =

Sussex County Football League
- Season: 1934–35
- Champions: Horsham
- Matches played: 156
- Goals scored: 791 (5.07 per match)

The 1934–35 Sussex County Football League season was the 15th in the history of the competition.

== League table ==
The league featured 13 clubs which competed in the last season, no new clubs joined the league this season.

=== League table ===
Pos	Team	Pld	W	D	L	GF	GA	GR	Pts
1	Horsham	24	21	0	3	105	36	2.917	42
2	Shoreham	24	19	2	3	75	44	1.705	40
3	Worthing	24	17	3	4	94	35	2.686	37
4	Chichester	24	12	2	10	58	58	1.000	26
5	Southwick	24	11	3	10	50	43	1.163	25
6	Newhaven	24	11	2	11	53	62	0.855	24
7	Lewes	24	10	3	11	74	67	1.104	23
8	Bexhill	24	7	6	11	44	46	0.957	20
9	Vernon Athletic	24	8	3	13	57	55	1.036	19
10	Bognor Regis	24	8	3	13	49	67	0.731	19
11	Littlehampton	24	8	3	13	47	73	0.644	19
12	Haywards Heath	24	4	1	19	49	102	0.480	9
13	Hove	24	3	3	18	36	103	0.350	9

Source: Non-League Matters
Rules for classification: 1) points; 2) goal difference; 3) number of goals scored.
The points system until the 1982–83 season: 2 points for a win, 1 point for a draw and 0 points for losing.
