= 1935–36 Sussex County Football League =

Sussex County Football League
- Season: 1935–36
- Champions: Horsham
- Matches played: 182
- Goals scored: 986 (5.42 per match)

The 1935–36 Sussex County Football League season was the 16th in the history of the competition.

== League table ==
The league featured 14 clubs, 13 which competed in the last season, along with one new club:

- Eastbourne Comrades

=== League table ===
Pos	Team	Pld	W	D	L	GF	GA	GR	Pts
1	Horsham	26	22	2	2	143	42	3.405	46
2	Worthing	26	18	3	5	107	58	1.845	39
3	Hove	26	15	5	6	76	61	1.246	35
4	Lewes	26	13	5	8	102	53	1.925	31
5	Littlehampton	26	13	5	8	68	64	1.063	31
6	Haywards Heath	26	10	6	10	80	82	0.976	26
7	Southwick	26	12	2	12	46	49	0.939	26
8	Bexhill	26	11	4	11	69	77	0.896	26
9	Bognor Regis	26	9	3	14	48	68	0.706	21
10	Chichester	26	8	5	13	62	97	0.639	21
11	Newhaven	26	8	3	15	49	73	0.671	19
12	Shoreham	26	6	6	14	47	73	0.644	18
13	Eastbourne Comrades	26	5	3	18	56	96	0.583	13
14	Vernon Athletic	26	5	2	19	33	93	0.355	12

Source: Non-League Matters
Rules for classification: 1) points; 2) goal difference; 3) number of goals scored.
The points system until the 1982–83 season: 2 points for a win, 1 point for a draw and 0 points for losing.
