= 1930–31 Sussex County Football League =

Sussex County Football League
- Season: 1930–31
- Champions: Worthing
- Matches played: 132
- Goals scored: 787 (5.96 per match)

The 1930–31 Sussex County Football League season was the eleventh in the history of the competition.

== League table ==
The league featured 12 clubs which competed in the last season, no new clubs joined the league this season.

=== League table ===
Pos	Team	Pld	W	D	L	GF	GA	GR	Pts
1	Worthing	22	18	1	3	88	33	2.667	37
2	Horsham	22	17	0	5	104	53	1.962	34
3	Southwick	22	16	0	6	103	42	2.452	32
4	Haywards Heath	22	14	2	6	70	44	1.591	30
5	Lewes	22	13	3	6	70	45	1.556	29
6	Chichester	22	8	6	8	53	67	0.791	22
7	Hove	22	9	2	11	67	76	0.882	20
8	Newhaven	22	7	1	14	61	82	0.744	15
9	Littlehampton	22	6	3	13	51	91	0.560	15
10	Bexhill	22	4	5	13	46	82	0.561	13
11	Bognor Regis	22	5	1	16	40	80	0.500	11
12	Vernon Athletic	22	2	2	18	34	92	0.370	6

Source: Non-League Matters
Rules for classification: 1) points; 2) goal difference; 3) number of goals scored.
The points system until the 1982–83 season: 2 points for a win, 1 point for a draw and 0 points for losing.
