= 1938–39 Sussex County Football League =

Sussex County Football League
- Season: 1938–39
- Champions: Worthing
- Matches played: 182
- Goals scored: 1,058 (5.81 per match)

The 1938–39 Sussex County Football League season was the 19th in the history of the competition.

== League table ==
The league featured 14 clubs which competed in the last season, no new clubs joined the league this season.
Littlehampton added Town to the club name.

=== League table ===
Pos	Team	Pld	W	D	L	GF	GA	GR	Pts
1	Worthing	26	23	1	2	133	38	3.500	47
2	Bognor Regis	26	19	3	4	96	45	2.133	41
3	Southwick	26	19	2	5	97	36	2.694	40
4	Horsham	26	17	0	9	102	42	2.429	34
5	Haywards Heath	26	13	4	9	86	72	1.194	30
6	Lewes	26	12	2	12	93	89	1.045	26
7	Littlehampton Town	26	11	2	13	68	68	1.000	24
8	Newhaven	26	8	6	12	49	69	0.710	22
9	East Grinstead	26	10	2	14	56	81	0.691	22
10	Bexhill	26	8	1	17	64	87	0.736	17
11	Hove	26	6	5	15	60	97	0.619	17
12	Eastbourne Comrades	26	6	3	17	48	102	0.471	15
13	Chichester	26	7	1	18	57	131	0.435	15
14	Shoreham	26	7	0	19	49	101	0.485	14

Source: Non-League Matters
Rules for classification: 1) points; 2) goal difference; 3) number of goals scored.
The points system until the 1982–83 season: 2 points for a win, 1 point for a draw and 0 points for losing.
