= 1929–30 Sussex County Football League =

Sussex County Football League
- Season: 1929–30
- Champions: Southwick
- Matches played: 132
- Goals scored: 671 (5.08 per match)

The 1929–30 Sussex County Football League season was the tenth in the history of the competition.

== League table ==
The league featured 12 clubs which competed in the last season, no new clubs joined the league this season.

=== League table ===
Pos	Team	Pld	W	D	L	GF	GA	GR	Pts
1	Southwick	22	20	1	1	106	18	5.889	41
2	Horsham	22	17	2	3	78	42	1.857	36
3	Haywards Heath	22	15	1	6	60	50	1.200	31
4	Worthing	22	13	2	7	63	40	1.575	28
5	Lewes	22	11	5	6	70	49	1.429	27
6	Newhaven	22	10	3	9	61	54	1.130	23
7	Chichester	22	9	2	11	41	47	0.872	20
8	Bexhill	22	6	6	10	54	78	0.692	18
9	Bognor Regis	22	5	2	15	41	63	0.651	12
10	Hove	22	4	2	16	34	61	0.557	10
11	Vernon Athletic	22	4	2	16	26	81	0.321	10
12	Littlehampton	22	4	0	18	37	88	0.420	8

Source: Non-League Matters
Rules for classification: 1) points; 2) goal difference; 3) number of goals scored.
The points system until the 1982–83 season: 2 points for a win, 1 point for a draw and 0 points for losing.
