= 1932–33 Sussex County Football League =

Sussex County Football League
- Season: 1932–32
- Champions: Horsham
- Matches played: 156
- Goals scored: 758 (4.86 per match)

The 1932–33 Sussex County Football League season was the 13th in the history of the competition.

== League table ==
The league featured 13 clubs, 12 which competed in the last season, along with one new club:

- Shoreham

=== League table ===
Pos	Team	Pld	W	D	L	GF	GA	GR	Pts
1	Horsham	24	20	1	3	111	40	2.775	41
2	Worthing	24	15	4	5	75	37	2.027	34
3	Lewes	24	14	3	7	79	47	1.681	31
4	Southwick	24	13	5	6	48	37	1.297	31
5	Newhaven	24	12	4	8	68	48	1.417	28
6	Chichester	24	10	5	9	62	83	0.747	25
7	Shoreham	24	11	1	12	59	57	1.035	23
8	Hove	24	9	4	11	44	49	0.898	22
9	Vernon Athletic	24	9	2	13	48	59	0.814	20
10	Bognor Regis	24	8	3	13	41	63	0.651	19
11	Littlehampton	24	7	2	15	43	77	0.558	16
12	Bexhill	24	5	3	16	40	74	0.541	13
13	Haywards Heath	24	3	3	18	40	87	0.460	9

Source: Non-League Matters
Rules for classification: 1) points; 2) goal difference; 3) number of goals scored.
The points system until the 1982–83 season: 2 points for a win, 1 point for a draw and 0 points for losing.
