= 1955–56 Sussex County Football League =

Sussex County Football League
- Season: 1955–56
- Champions: Eastbourne United

The 1955–56 Sussex County Football League season was the 31st in the history of the competition.

Division 1 still remained at seventeen teams with Three Bridges United being promoted from Division 2. Division 2 now featured fourteen teams from which the winners would be promoted into Division 1.

== Division One ==
The division featured 17 clubs, 16 which competed in the last season, along with one new club:

- Three Bridges United, promoted from last season's Division Two

=== League table ===
Division One
- Season: 1955–56
- Champions: Eastbourne United
- Relegated: Three Bridges United
- Matches played: 272
- Goals scored: 1,275 (4.69 per match)

Pos	Team	Pld	W	D	L	GF	GA	GR	Pts	Qualification or relegation
1	Eastbourne United	32	23	6	3	114	50	2.280	52	Joined Metropolitan League
2	Whitehawk & Manor Farm Old Boys	32	21	5	6	97	46	2.109	47	
3	Bognor Regis Town	32	20	3	9	113	57	1.982	43	
4	Lewes	30	19	3	8	89	55	1.618	41	
5	Chichester City	32	17	6	9	102	57	1.789	40	
6	Arundel	32	15	8	9	84	67	1.254	38	
7	Hove White Rovers	32	16	5	11	79	66	1.197	37	
8	Southwick	32	14	5	13	66	70	0.943	33	
9	Newhaven	32	14	4	14	72	64	1.125	32	
10	Littlehampton Town	32	12	8	12	75	68	1.103	32	
11	East Grinstead	32	10	7	15	68	96	0.708	27	
12	Bexhill Town Athletic	32	11	4	17	67	83	0.807	26	
13	Lancing Athletic	32	11	4	17	70	87	0.805	26	
14	Brighton Old Grammarians	32	9	7	16	43	77	0.558	25	
15	Shoreham	32	7	4	21	59	106	0.557	18	
16	Wigmore Athletic	32	6	4	22	42	100	0.420	16	
17	Three Bridges United	32	4	1	27	35	126	0.278	9	Relegated to Division Two

Source: Non-League Matters
Rules for classification: 1) points; 2) goal difference; 3) number of goals scored.
The points system until the 1982–83 season: 2 points for a win, 1 point for a draw and 0 points for losing.

== Division Two ==
The division featured 14 clubs, 10 which competed in the last season, along with four new clubs:

- Crawley, relegated from last season's Division One
- Battle Rangers
- Hailsham
- Uckfield Town

=== League table ===
Division Two
- Season: 1955–56
- Champions: Rye United
- Promoted: Rye United
- Matches played: 182
- Goals scored: 955 (5.25 per match)

Pos	Team	Pld	W	D	L	GF	GA	GR	Pts	Qualification or relegation
1	Rye United	26	22	1	3	111	45	2.467	45	Promoted to Division One
2	Crawley	26	20	2	4	96	28	3.429	42	Joined Metropolitan League
3	APV Athletic	26	17	2	7	62	43	1.442	36	
4	Hastings Rangers	26	16	1	9	73	43	1.698	33	
5	Sidley United	26	13	4	9	64	69	0.928	30	
6	Hastings & St Leonards	26	13	2	11	85	78	1.090	28	
7	Hailsham	26	11	4	11	72	77	0.935	26	
8	Goldstone	26	11	3	12	55	60	0.917	25	
9	Uckfield Town	26	10	3	13	60	73	0.822	23	
10	Battle Rangers	26	8	3	15	65	74	0.878	19	
11	Moulsecoomb Rovers	26	7	3	16	57	79	0.722	17	
12	Chichester United	26	7	2	17	57	99	0.576	16	
13	Seaford Town	26	5	4	17	46	91	0.505	14	
14	Cuckfield	26	5	0	21	52	96	0.542	10	

Source: Non-League Matters
Rules for classification: 1) points; 2) goal difference; 3) number of goals scored.
The points system until the 1982–83 season: 2 points for a win, 1 point for a draw and 0 points for losing.
