= 1962–63 Sussex County Football League =

Sussex County Football League
- Season: 1962–63
- Champions: Season Abandoned

The 1962–63 Sussex County Football League season was the 38th in the history of the competition.

This season was abandoned during the winter of 1962–63, when atrocious weather across the country led to postponements of football matches. This was difficult situation in the Sussex County League as some teams had completed with 21 or 22 games whilst others only completed 13 or 14 times. The league was then abandoned and an emergency competition was set up. Below are the league tables then the league was abandoned.

== Division One ==
The division featured 17 clubs, 16 which competed in the last season, along with one new club:

- Shoreham, promoted from last season's Division Two

=== League table ===
Division One
- Season: 1962–63
- Champions: Season Abandoned
- Relegated: Season Abandoned

Pos	Team	Pld	W	D	L	GF	GA	GR	Pts
1	Lewes	18	13	5	0	62	15	4.133	31
2	Whitehawk	21	11	2	8	59	41	1.439	24
3	Bexhill Town Athletic	14	9	2	3	37	15	2.467	20
4	A P V Athletic	19	9	2	8	49	47	1.043	20
5	Chichester City	14	7	5	2	41	24	1.708	19
6	Haywards Heath	17	7	4	6	43	34	1.265	18
7	Littlehampton Town	18	7	3	8	49	49	1.000	17
8	East Grinstead	17	8	1	8	29	39	0.744	17
9	Lancing	21	7	3	11	38	61	0.623	17
10	Rye United	15	6	4	5	33	31	1.065	16
11	Newhaven	14	7	2	5	33	32	1.031	16
12	Sidley United	16	5	5	6	24	27	0.889	15
13	Wigmore Athletic	18	5	5	8	37	50	0.740	15
14	Bognor Regis Town	13	6	2	5	31	28	1.107	14
15	Shoreham	19	6	2	11	30	38	0.789	14
16	Arundel	15	4	0	11	26	43	0.605	8
17	Hastings Rangers	19	2	3	14	31	78	0.397	7

Source: Non-League Matters
Rules for classification: 1) points; 2) goal difference; 3) number of goals scored.
The points system until the 1982–83 season: 2 points for a win, 1 point for a draw and 0 points for losing.

== Division Two ==
The division featured 16 clubs, 14 which competed in the last season, along with two new clubs:

- Old Varndeanians, relegated from last season's Division One
- Hellingly Hospital

Division Two
- Season: 1962–63
- Champions: Season Abandoned
- Promoted: Season Abandoned

=== League table ===
Pos	Team	Pld	W	D	L	GF	GA	GR	Pts	Qualification or relegation
1	Seaford Town	19	17	1	1	104	31	3.355	35	
2	Selsey	16	14	1	1	84	11	7.636	29	
3	Horsham YMCA	16	12	2	2	82	38	2.158	26	
4	Southwick	14	12	0	2	63	20	3.150	24	
5	Battle Rangers	17	9	2	6	64	42	1.524	20	
6	Three Bridges United	17	8	3	6	49	36	1.361	19	
7	Old Varndeanians	18	8	2	8	44	47	0.936	18	
8	Uckfield Town	15	7	2	6	34	41	0.829	16	
9	Hastings & St Leonards	15	7	1	7	41	46	0.891	15	
10	Brighton North End	17	7	0	10	55	56	0.982	14	
11	Moulsecoomb Rovers	14	6	2	6	34	38	0.895	14	
12	Brighton Old Grammarians	16	6	1	9	38	58	0.655	13	
13	Burgess Hill	18	4	2	12	31	58	0.534	10	
14	Hellingly Hospital	22	3	1	18	31	106	0.292	7	Left the league
15	Portslade	17	2	2	13	22	74	0.297	6	Left the league
16	Goldstone	17	1	0	16	24	98	0.245	2	Left the league

Source: Non-League Matters
Rules for classification: 1) points; 2) goal difference; 3) number of goals scored.
The points system until the 1982–83 season: 2 points for a win, 1 point for a draw and 0 points for losing.

== Emergency competition ==
The emergency competition, the clubs were placed into 8 groups, four with Division 1 clubs and 4 with Division 2 clubs. The plan was for teams to play both home and away games within their group to decide the winners, who then continued in the knock-out stage. This worked for groups A to F but groups G and H were unable to all play games, and would not have affected which club finished top of each group.

=== Group A ===
Pos	Team	Pld	W	D	L	GF	GA	GR	Pts	Qualification or relegation
1	Chichester City	6	5	0	1	24	11	2.182	10	Qualified
2	Bognor Regis Town	6	3	1	2	22	15	1.467	7	
3	Littlehampton Town	6	3	0	3	17	14	1.214	6	
4	Arundel	6	0	1	5	9	32	0.281	1	

Source: Non-League Matters
Rules for classification: 1) points; 2) goal difference; 3) number of goals scored.
The points system until the 1982–83 season: 2 points for a win, 1 point for a draw and 0 points for losing.

=== Group B ===
Pos	Team	Pld	W	D	L	GF	GA	GR	Pts	Qualification or relegation
1	Shoreham	6	4	1	1	21	12	1.750	9	Qualified
2	Whitehawk	6	3	1	2	20	16	1.250	7	
3	Wigmore Athletic	6	2	1	3	18	29	0.621	5	
4	Lancing	6	1	1	4	20	22	0.909	3	

Source: Non-League Matters
Rules for classification: 1) points; 2) goal difference; 3) number of goals scored.
The points system until the 1982–83 season: 2 points for a win, 1 point for a draw and 0 points for losing.

=== Group C ===
Pos	Team	Pld	W	D	L	GF	GA	GR	Pts	Qualification or relegation
1	Lewes	8	7	1	0	29	8	3.625	15	Qualified
2	Haywards Heath	8	5	1	2	27	18	1.500	11	
3	Newhaven	8	4	1	3	24	23	1.043	9	
4	APV Athletic	8	1	2	5	18	23	0.783	4	
5	East Grinstead	8	0	1	7	8	34	0.235	1	

Source: Non-League Matters
Rules for classification: 1) points; 2) goal difference; 3) number of goals scored.
The points system until the 1982–83 season: 2 points for a win, 1 point for a draw and 0 points for losing.

=== Group D ===
Pos	Team	Pld	W	D	L	GF	GA	GR	Pts	Qualification or relegation
1	Bexhill Town Athletic	6	5	1	0	21	7	3.000	11	Qualified
2	Sidley	6	3	1	2	14	10	1.400	7	
3	Rye United	6	1	3	2	12	14	0.857	5	
4	Hastings Rangers	6	0	1	5	12	28	0.429	1	

Source: Non-League Matters
Rules for classification: 1) points; 2) goal difference; 3) number of goals scored.
The points system until the 1982–83 season: 2 points for a win, 1 point for a draw and 0 points for losing.

=== Group E ===
Pos	Team	Pld	W	D	L	GF	GA	GR	Pts	Qualification or relegation
1	Selsey	6	5	1	0	33	6	5.500	11	Qualified
2	Southwick	6	2	2	2	19	11	1.727	6	
3	Goldstone	6	1	2	3	7	24	0.292	4	
4	Portslade	6	1	1	4	8	26	0.308	3	

Source: Non-League Matters
Rules for classification: 1) points; 2) goal difference; 3) number of goals scored.
The points system until the 1982–83 season: 2 points for a win, 1 point for a draw and 0 points for losing.

=== Group F ===
Pos	Team	Pld	W	D	L	GF	GA	GR	Pts	Qualification or relegation
1	Brighton Old Grammarians	6	4	1	1	17	9	1.889	9	Qualified
2	Old Varndeanians	6	3	1	2	16	16	1.000	7	
3	Molsecoomb Rovers	6	3	0	3	15	21	0.714	6	
4	Brighton North End	6	1	0	5	14	16	0.875	2	

Source: Non-League Matters
Rules for classification: 1) points; 2) goal difference; 3) number of goals scored.
The points system until the 1982–83 season: 2 points for a win, 1 point for a draw and 0 points for losing.

=== Group G ===
Pos	Team	Pld	W	D	L	GF	GA	GR	Pts	Qualification or relegation
1	Horsham YMCA	6	3	3	0	16	4	4.000	9	Qualified
2	Three Bridges United	5	2	1	2	13	8	1.625	5	
3	Burgess Hill Town	5	2	1	2	5	11	0.455	5	
4	Uckfield Town	6	1	1	4	4	15	0.267	3	

Source: Non-League Matters
Rules for classification: 1) points; 2) goal difference; 3) number of goals scored.
The points system until the 1982–83 season: 2 points for a win, 1 point for a draw and 0 points for losing.

=== Group H ===
Pos	Team	Pld	W	D	L	GF	GA	GR	Pts	Qualification or relegation
1	Seaford Town	4	4	0	0	19	5	3.800	8	Qualified
2	Hastings & St Leonards	6	2	1	3	21	16	1.313	5	
3	Hellingly Hospital	4	1	1	2	9	19	0.474	3	
4	Battle Rangers	4	0	2	2	6	15	0.400	2	

Source: Non-League Matters
Rules for classification: 1) points; 2) goal difference; 3) number of goals scored.
The points system until the 1982–83 season: 2 points for a win, 1 point for a draw and 0 points for losing.

=== Knock-out stage ===
Source: Non-League Matters

Quarter-finals
Selsey	5
Chichester City	3
Bexhill Town Athletic	3
Brighton Old Grammarians	0
Horsham YMCA	5
Seaford Town	1
Lewes	0
Shoreham	4

Semi-finals
Selsey	3
Bexhill Town Athletic	2
Horsham YMCA	2
Shoreham	3

Final
Selsey	2
Shoreham	7
