= 1953–54 Sussex County Football League =

Sussex County Football League
- Season: 1953–54
- Champions: Newhaven

The 1953–54 Sussex County Football League season was the 29th in the history of the competition.

Division 1 featured now increased to fifteen teams with Wigmore Athletic being promoted from Division 2. Division 2 featured eleven teams from which the winners would be promoted into Division 1.

== Division One ==
The division featured 15 clubs, 14 which competed in the last season, along with one new club, promoted from last season's Division Two:

- Wigmore Athletic

=== League table ===
Division One
- Season: 1953–54
- Champions: Newhaven
- Matches played: 210
- Goals scored: 926 (4.41 per match)

Pos	Team	Pld	W	D	L	GF	GA	GR	Pts
1	Newhaven	28	22	3	3	74	27	2.741	47
2	Eastbourne United	28	18	2	8	77	38	2.026	38
3	Shoreham	28	16	3	9	67	49	1.367	35
4	Littlehampton Town	28	14	5	9	72	66	1.091	33
5	East Grinstead	28	15	3	10	58	65	0.892	33
6	Whitehawk & Manor Farm Old Boys	28	13	4	11	78	61	1.279	30
7	Bognor Regis Town	28	13	3	12	59	53	1.113	29
8	Arundel	28	13	3	12	51	52	0.981	29
9	Brighton Old Grammarians	28	11	4	13	68	64	1.063	26
10	Lancing Athletic	28	10	5	13	57	59	0.966	25
11	Crawley	28	11	2	15	55	70	0.786	24
12	Chichester City	28	9	4	15	47	59	0.797	22
13	Wigmore Athletic	28	10	1	17	61	76	0.803	21
14	Bexhill Town Athletic	28	7	2	19	49	89	0.551	16
15	Lewes	28	4	4	20	53	98	0.541	12

Source: Non-League Matters
Rules for classification: 1) points; 2) goal difference; 3) number of goals scored.
The points system until the 1982–83 season: 2 points for a win, 1 point for a draw and 0 points for losing.

== Division Two ==
The division featured 11 clubs which competed in the last season, no new clubs joined the league this season.
Three Bridges added United to the club name.

=== League table ===
Division Two
- Season: 1953–54
- Champions: Hove White Rovers
- Promoted: Hove White Rovers
- Matches played: 110
- Goals scored: 580 (5.27 per match)

Pos	Team	Pld	W	D	L	GF	GA	GR	Pts	Qualification or relegation
1	Hove White Rovers	20	16	0	4	69	29	2.379	32	Promoted to Division One
2	Rye United	20	13	3	4	76	33	2.303	29	
3	Cuckfield	20	11	5	4	59	44	1.341	27	
4	Hastings Rangers	20	11	4	5	63	31	2.032	26	
5	Goldstone	20	9	5	6	53	34	1.559	23	
6	Three Bridges United	20	9	5	6	58	40	1.450	23	
7	Sidley United	20	8	2	10	47	54	0.870	18	
8	Pulborough	20	7	3	10	52	77	0.675	17	Left the league
9	Seaford Town	20	7	1	12	46	59	0.780	15	
10	Moulsecoomb Rovers	20	4	1	15	38	71	0.535	9	
11	Hastings & St Leonards	20	0	1	19	19	108	0.176	1	

Source: Non-League Matters
Rules for classification: 1) points; 2) goal difference; 3) number of goals scored.
The points system until the 1982–83 season: 2 points for a win, 1 point for a draw and 0 points for losing.
