= 1964–65 Sussex County Football League =

The 1964–65 Sussex County Football League season was the 40th in the history of Sussex County Football League a football competition in England.

== Division One ==
Sussex County Football League Division One
- Season: 1964–65
- Champions: Lewes
- Promoted: Lewes
- Relegated: Hastings Rangers; Newhaven
- Matches played: 272
- Goals scored: 1,158 (4.26 per match)

Division One featured 15 clubs which competed in the division last season, along with two new clubs, promoted from Division Two:

- Seaford Town
- Selsey

=== League table ===
Pos	Team	Pld	W	D	L	GF	GA	GR	Pts	Qualification or relegation
1	Lewes	31	27	4	0	102	22	4.636	58	Promoted to the Athenian League
2	Lancing	32	21	5	6	75	44	1.705	47	
3	Rye United	32	17	4	11	92	67	1.373	38	
4	Bognor Regis Town	32	15	7	10	60	56	1.071	37	
5	Littlehampton Town	31	16	4	11	71	48	1.479	36	
6	Haywards Heath	32	15	6	11	58	46	1.261	36	
7	Chichester City	32	14	8	10	79	65	1.215	36	
8	Selsey	32	15	5	12	84	69	1.217	35	
9	Seaford Town	32	11	9	12	65	68	0.956	31	
10	Whitehawk	32	13	4	15	67	82	0.817	30	
11	Wigmore Athletic	32	11	5	16	57	68	0.838	27	
12	Bexhill Town Athletic	32	10	4	18	52	85	0.612	24	
13	East Grinstead	32	10	3	19	69	100	0.690	23	
14	Arundel	32	8	7	17	42	62	0.677	23	
15	Shoreham	32	9	4	19	76	94	0.809	22	
16	Hastings Rangers	32	8	5	19	53	82	0.646	21	Relegated to Division Two
17	Newhaven	32	7	4	21	49	93	0.527	18	Relegated to Division Two

Source: nonleaguematters
Rules for classification: 1) points; 2) goal ratio.

== Division Two ==
Sussex County Football League Division Two
- Season: 1964–65
- Champions: Sidley United
- Promoted: Sidley United; Southwick
- Matches played: 306
- Goals scored: 1,408 (4.6 per match)

Division Two featured twelve clubs which competed in the division last season, along with six new clubs:

- APV Athletic, relegated from Division One
- Ferring
- Sidley United, relegated from Division One
- Steyning, joined from the Brighton, Hove & District League
- Wadhurst
- Wick, joined from the West Sussex League

Also, Three Bridges United changed name to Three Bridges.

=== League table ===
Pos	Team	Pld	W	D	L	GF	GA	GR	Pts	Qualification or relegation
1	Sidley United	34	28	1	5	129	39	3.308	57	Promoted to Division One
2	Southwick	34	27	2	5	139	26	5.346	56	Promoted to Division One
3	Ringmer	34	26	4	4	114	41	2.780	56	
4	Wadhurst	34	19	8	7	86	67	1.284	46	
5	Wick	34	15	8	11	77	55	1.400	38	
6	APV Athletic	34	15	6	13	86	76	1.132	36	
7	Horsham YMCA	34	16	4	14	83	78	1.064	36	
8	Portfield	34	13	8	13	75	81	0.926	34	
9	Brighton North End	34	15	3	16	86	94	0.915	33	
10	Three Bridges	34	14	4	16	76	82	0.927	32	
11	Steyning	34	12	6	16	54	85	0.635	30	
12	Old Varndeanians	34	11	7	16	52	65	0.800	29	
13	Battle Rangers	34	13	3	18	78	100	0.780	29	
14	Brighton Old Grammarians	34	9	9	16	77	92	0.837	27	
15	Hastings & St Leonards	34	11	2	21	59	81	0.728	24	
16	Burgess Hill	34	8	6	20	45	77	0.584	22	
17	Ferring	34	6	9	19	43	93	0.462	21	
18	Uckfield Town	34	2	2	30	49	176	0.278	6	

Source: nonleaguematters
Rules for classification: 1) points; 2) goal ratio.
