= 1931–32 Sussex County Football League =

Sussex County Football League
- Season: 1931–32
- Champions: Horsham
- Matches played: 132
- Goals scored: 696 (5.27 per match)

The 1931–32 Sussex County Football League season was the 12th in the history of the competition.

== League table ==
The league featured 12 clubs which competed in the last season, no new clubs joined the league this season.

=== League table ===
Pos	Team	Pld	W	D	L	GF	GA	GR	Pts
1	Horsham	22	15	5	2	90	34	2.647	35
2	Worthing	22	15	0	7	83	31	2.677	30
3	Lewes	22	12	5	5	73	45	1.622	29
4	Haywards Heath	22	13	1	8	66	63	1.048	27
5	Southwick	22	10	6	6	60	53	1.132	26
6	Chichester	22	9	3	10	57	52	1.096	21
7	Newhaven	22	9	3	10	56	59	0.949	21
8	Vernon Athletic	22	7	6	9	50	54	0.926	20
9	Hove	22	6	6	10	44	59	0.746	18
10	Bexhill	22	6	5	11	38	60	0.633	15 (Note: Bexhill deducted 2 points, reasons unknown as yet.)
11	Bognor Regis	22	6	3	13	44	77	0.571	15
12	Littlehampton	22	1	3	18	35	109	0.321	5

Source: Non-League Matters
Rules for classification: 1) points; 2) goal difference; 3) number of goals scored.
The points system until the 1982–83 season: 2 points for a win, 1 point for a draw and 0 points for losing.
