= 1937–38 Sussex County Football League =

Sussex County Football League
- Season: 1937–38
- Champions: Horsham
- Matches played: 182
- Goals scored: 850 (4.67 per match)

The 1937–38 Sussex County Football League season was the 18th in the history of the competition.

== League table ==
The league featured 14 clubs, 13 which competed in the last season, along with one new club:

- East Grinstead

=== League table ===
Pos	Team	Pld	W	D	L	GF	GA	GR	Pts
1	Horsham	26	20	1	5	88	43	2.047	41
2	Southwick	26	17	4	5	79	38	2.079	38
3	Haywards Heath	26	15	6	5	102	47	2.170	36
4	Worthing	26	14	2	10	69	44	1.568	30
5	East Grinstead	26	14	2	10	56	54	1.037	30
6	Bexhill	26	11	4	11	48	44	1.091	26
7	Newhaven	26	12	2	12	56	64	0.875	26
8	Hove	26	10	4	12	60	56	1.071	24
9	Lewes	26	10	2	14	61	60	1.017	22
10	Eastbourne Comrades	26	9	2	15	46	77	0.597	20
11	Littlehampton	26	9	1	16	49	67	0.731	19
12	Chichester	26	9	1	16	42	78	0.538	19
13	Bognor Regis	26	7	3	16	50	84	0.595	17
14	Shoreham	26	7	2	17	44	94	0.468	16

Source: Non-League Matters
Rules for classification: 1) points; 2) goal difference; 3) number of goals scored.
The points system until the 1982–83 season: 2 points for a win, 1 point for a draw and 0 points for losing.
