= 1936–37 Sussex County Football League =

Sussex County Football League
- Season: 1936–37
- Champions: Horsham
- Matches played: 182
- Goals scored: 1,054 (5.79 per match)

The 1936–37 Sussex County Football League season was the 17th in the history of the competition.

== League table ==
The league featured 14 clubs which competed in the last season, no new clubs joined the league this season.

=== League table ===
Pos	Team	Pld	W	D	L	GF	GA	GR	Pts	Qualification or relegation
1	Horsham	26	21	2	3	145	53	2.736	44	
2	Southwick	26	18	3	5	86	42	2.048	39	
3	Worthing	26	18	2	6	116	37	3.135	38	
4	Haywards Heath	26	17	2	7	114	70	1.629	36	
5	Lewes	26	16	3	7	91	65	1.400	35	
6	Littlehampton	26	15	2	9	101	65	1.554	32	
7	Newhaven	26	13	6	7	73	54	1.352	32	
8	Shoreham	26	9	4	13	51	79	0.646	22	
9	Hove	26	8	5	13	53	74	0.716	21	
10	Bexhill	26	9	2	15	53	71	0.746	20	
11	Chichester	26	8	3	15	61	91	0.670	19	
12	Eastbourne Comrades	26	8	1	17	47	90	0.522	17	
13	Bognor Regis	26	2	2	22	36	117	0.308	6	
14	Vernon Athletic	26	1	1	24	27	146	0.185	3	Left the League

Source: Non-League Matters
Rules for classification: 1) points; 2) goal difference; 3) number of goals scored.
The points system until the 1982–83 season: 2 points for a win, 1 point for a draw and 0 points for losing.
