= 1928–29 Sussex County Football League =

Sussex County Football League
- Season: 1928–29
- Champions: Worthing
- Matches played: 132
- Goals scored: 738 (5.59 per match)

The 1928–29 Sussex County Football League season was the ninth in the history of the competition.

== League table ==
The league featured 12 clubs, 11 which competed in the last season, along with one new club:

- Littlehampton

=== League table ===
Pos	Team	Pld	W	D	L	GF	GA	GR	Pts
1	Worthing	22	17	2	3	68	26	2.615	36
2	Southwick	22	16	0	6	82	25	3.280	32
3	Horsham	22	10	7	5	84	50	1.680	27
4	Bognor	22	10	4	8	47	53	0.887	24
5	Vernon Athletic	22	10	3	9	63	76	0.829	23
6	Lewes	22	10	2	10	76	74	1.027	22
7	Haywards Heath	22	9	3	10	71	81	0.877	21
8	Chichester	22	8	4	10	67	58	1.155	20
9	Newhaven	22	6	4	12	39	71	0.549	16
10	Littlehampton	22	7	1	14	50	72	0.694	15
11	Hove	22	7	1	14	48	72	0.667	15
12	Bexhill	22	6	1	15	43	80	0.538	13

Source: Non-League Matters
Rules for classification: 1) points; 2) goal difference; 3) number of goals scored.
The points system until the 1982–83 season: 2 points for a win, 1 point for a draw and 0 points for losing.
