= 1933–34 Sussex County Football League =

Sussex County Football League
- Season: 1933–34
- Champions: Worthing
- Matches played: 156
- Goals scored: 781 (5.01 per match)

The 1933–34 Sussex County Football League season was the 14th in the history of the competition.

== League table ==
The league featured 13 clubs which competed in the last season, no new clubs joined the league this season.

=== League table ===
Pos	Team	Pld	W	D	L	GF	GA	GR	Pts
1	Worthing	24	19	1	4	95	35	2.714	39
2	Lewes	24	17	2	5	95	50	1.900	36
3	Shoreham	24	17	1	6	81	73	1.110	35
4	Southwick	24	12	5	7	75	34	2.206	29
5	Vernon Athletic	24	12	5	7	59	41	1.439	29
6	Horsham	24	12	1	11	67	52	1.288	25
7	Littlehampton	24	10	2	12	53	77	0.688	22
8	Newhaven	24	7	6	11	43	54	0.796	20
9	Bexhill	24	7	3	14	41	61	0.672	17
10	Bognor Regis	24	6	5	13	47	68	0.691	17
11	Haywards Heath	24	8	0	16	47	78	0.603	16
12	Hove	24	7	0	17	44	90	0.489	14
13	Chichester	24	5	3	16	34	68	0.500	13

Source: Non-League Matters
Rules for classification: 1) points; 2) goal difference; 3) number of goals scored.
The points system until the 1982–83 season: 2 points for a win, 1 point for a draw and 0 points for losing.
