= 1945–46 Sussex County Football League =

Sussex County Football League
- Season: 1945–46
- Champions: Haywards Heath
- Matches played: 128
- Goals scored: 732 (5.72 per match)

The 1945–46 Sussex County Football League season was the 21st in the history of the competition.

Teams were placed into two separate leagues, Eastern Division and Western Division. With the winners of each league playing in a play-off to decide the overall winner.

== Clubs ==
The league featured 17 clubs, 11 which competed in the 1939–40 season, along with six new clubs:

- Crawley
- Bexhill Wanderers
- Brighton & Hove Albion Juniors
- CADM & TC (Eastbourne)
- H.M.S. Peregrine (Ford)
- R.A.F. Tangmere

== Eastern Division ==
=== League table ===
Pos	Team	Pld	W	D	L	GF	GA	GR	Pts	Qualification or relegation
1	Haywards Heath	14	11	0	3	51	13	3.923	22	Division champions
2	East Grinstead	14	8	4	2	44	20	2.200	20	
3	Lewes	14	9	2	3	32	21	1.524	20	
4	Newhaven	14	7	3	4	39	40	0.975	17	
5	Crawley	14	6	1	7	29	37	0.784	13	Left the League
6	Bexhill Wanderers	14	3	4	7	26	48	0.542	10	Left the League
7	Brighton & Hove Albion Juniors	14	2	2	10	25	59	0.424	6	Left the League
8	CADM & TC (Eastbourne)	14	1	2	11	14	20	0.700	4	Left the League

Source: Sussex County league - Historic League Tables
Rules for classification: 1) points; 2) goal difference; 3) number of goals scored.
The points system until the 1982–83 season: 2 points for a win, 1 point for a draw and 0 points for losing.

== Western Division ==
=== League table ===
Pos	Team	Pld	W	D	L	GF	GA	GR	Pts	Qualification or relegation
1	Worthing	16	14	1	1	96	15	6.400	29	Division champions
2	Horsham	16	13	1	2	81	33	2.455	27	
3	H.M.S. Peregrine (Ford)	16	11	1	4	63	41	1.537	23	Left the League
4	Littlehampton Town	16	9	2	5	66	40	1.650	20	
5	Bognor Regis	16	7	1	8	55	72	0.764	15	
6	Shoreham	16	5	2	9	36	78	0.462	12	
7	Southwick	16	4	1	11	29	60	0.483	9	
8	Hove	16	4	0	12	31	89	0.348	8	
9	R.A.F. Tangmere	16	0	1	15	15	44	0.341	1	Left the League

Source: Sussex County league - Historic League Tables
Rules for classification: 1) points; 2) goal difference; 3) number of goals scored.
The points system until the 1982–83 season: 2 points for a win, 1 point for a draw and 0 points for losing.

== Play-off Final ==
Haywards Heath 1 — 0 Worthing
Source= Sussex County league - Historic League Tables
