= Southern Combination Football League =

English football league

- Founded: 1920 (as Sussex County League)
- Country: England
- Other club from: Guernsey
- Divisions: 3
- Number of clubs: 53
- Level on pyramid: Levels 9–11
- Feeder to: Isthmian League South East Division
- Relegation to: East Sussex Football League; Mid-Sussex Football League; West Sussex Football League
- Domestic cup(s): FA Cup; FA Vase; Sussex Senior Challenge Cup; Sussex RUR Cup
- League cup(s): The Peter Bentley League Cup; Division One Challenge Cup; Division Two Challenge Cup; The Reserve Section Challenge Cup
- Current champions: Steyning Town (Premier Division); Godalming Town (Division One); Hailsham Town (Division Two) (2025–26)
- Most championships: Horsham; Peacehaven & Telscombe; Worthing (8 titles)
- Website: Official
- Current: 2026–27 Southern Combination Football League

The Southern Combination Football League (named the Premier Sports Southern Combination Football League for sponsorship reasons) is a regional football league in England broadly covering the counties of East Sussex, West Sussex, Surrey and South West London, England.

The league comprises three hierarchical men's team divisions (Premier, One and Two), three regional Under 23 team divisions (North, East and West), four regional Under 18 team divisions (North, East, West and Central) and a walking football division. The men's divisions are at levels 9 to 11 of the English football league system (Steps 5, 6 and county feeder level of the National League System).

== History ==
The area covered by the Sussex County League is coloured in dark blue.

Formed in 1920 as the Sussex County Football League, started with just one division of 12 teams. By the end of the 1929–30 season, six of the original twelve teams remained, having played in every campaign since the competition began. The league saw regular changes in members between 1921 and 1928 and saw 23 clubs taking part. The league closed down during the Second World War and the league ran two competition sections in the 1945–46 season, an Eastern division with eight teams and a Western division with 9 teams. The winners of each competition played in a play-off for a champion. A normal single league practice resumed in 1946 with 14 clubs now playing.

A new division was created in 1952 when Division Two was instituted. Division One remained with 14 teams and Division Two with 12 teams. By 1958 the two leagues had 16 teams each. The 1962–63 season was abandoned due to the atrocious weather conditions, with some clubs playing over 20 games and others with only 13 or 14 games played; an emergency competition was played in a group stage style format with knock-out stages to the final. The 1970s saw the league membership decline.

In 1983 a third division was added for intermediate level teams looking for an easy entry into the football league pyramid system, and a 3-points-for-a-win system was introduced. Divisions One and Two remained at 16 teams each, Division Three started with 13 teams, increasing to 15 two seasons later. Some long term clubs experienced harder times and dropped into Division Two. A "Two Up Two Down" system of promotion and relegation was applied throughout the period but was occasionally affected by departures from the league itself. Division One increased to 18 teams for the 1988–89 season and 20 teams for the 1993–94 season, along with Division One increasing to 18 teams in the same season. Division Three increased to 16 teams in 2000.

The league changed its name to the Southern Combination Football League for the start of the 2015–16 season, keeping the acronym SCFL also attracting teams just across the Sussex border when the Football Association (FA) moved teams across leagues. The divisions were renamed at this time to Premier Division, Division One and Division Two, with the last keeping its intermediate status. Also, for the 2015–16 season the league added two U21s divisions, one in the East, and one in the West, consisting of 7 teams each, which lasted until the end of the 2017–18 season and replaced by two Under–23 divisions (East and West), and three Under–18 divisions (East, Central and West).

The Sin Bin rule was introduced for the 2019–20 season to reduce dissent between the players, also during the same season the coronavirus (COVID-19) pandemic halted all sporting events nationwide; the leagues and the Football Association agreed to end the season early and expunge all results, with no promotion or relegation between the leagues.

The league season was abandoned for a third time after the FA Alliance and Leagues committees announced that the 2020–21 would be curtailed, subject to ratification by The FA Council, with immediate effect.

The first team divisions – Premier, One and Two, sit at Steps 5 and 6, and level 11, formerly Step 7, of the English football league system, below the lower divisions of the Isthmian League and the Southern League. The reserve divisions are not part of the league system.

== Sponsorship ==
In the past, Unijet, Rich City, Matthew Clark and Badger Ales sponsored the Sussex County Football League. But between 2006 and 2014 the league was without a sponsor. Macron Store (Hastings) signed a 4-year deal beginning in the 2014–15 season resulting in the official name being changed to The Macron Sussex County League and then to The Macron Southern Combination Football League a year later. On 20 June 2023 Premier Sports announced at the League Annual General Meeting that they would be sponsoring the league.

Period	Sponsor	Brand
1990–2000	Unijet	Unijet Sussex County League
2000–2002	Rich City	Rich City Sussex County League
2002–2004	Matthew Clark	Matthew Clark Sussex County League
2004–2006	Badger Ales	Badger Ales Sussex County League
2006–2014	No Sponsor	Sussex County League
2014–2015	Macron	Macron Store Sussex County Football League
2015–2023	Macron	Macron Store Southern Combination Football League
2023–present	Premier Sports	Premier Sports Southern Combination Football League

== Current clubs ==
The league's 2026–27 constitution is:-

Premier Division

- AFC Varndeanians
- Bexhill United
- Billingshurst
- Crawley Down Gatwick
- East Grinstead Town
- Eastbourne United
- Forest Row
- Guernsey
- Hassocks
- Haywards Heath Town
- Horsham YM
- Lancing
- Lingfield
- Little Common
- Midhurst & Easebourne
- Newhaven
- Pagham
- Roffey
- Seaford Town
- Wick

Division One

- AFC Walcountians
- Arundel
- Clanfield
- Dial Square
- Dorking Wanderers B
- East Preston
- Guildford City
- Hailsham Town
- Infinity
- Jarvis Brook
- Loxwood
- Mile Oak
- Oakwood
- Reigate Priory
- Ringmer
- Saltdean United
- Selsey
- Shoreham
- Westfield
- Worthing United

Division Two

- Alfold
- ASC Brighton Rangers
- Bosham
- Brighton Electricity
- Chichester City B
- Copthorne
- Ferring
- Hurstpierpoint
- Rudgwick
- Rustington
- Southwater
- Storrington
- TD Shipley
- Upper Beeding
- Worthing Town

2026–27 Southern Combination League: location of member clubs by division
– Premier Division; – Division One; – Division Two

== Former clubs ==
As of 10 September 2026

The following former clubs are now playing in other leagues or levels. Only one team, Crawley Town is playing in the English Football League, whilst all other clubs in the list are currently playing in the National League System.

- AFC Uckfield Town
- Banstead Athletic
- Bognor Regis Town
- Broadbridge Heath
- Burgess Hill Town
- Chessington & Hook United
- Chichester City
- Crawley Town
- Crowborough Athletic
- Cuckfield Town
- Dorking Wanderers
- Eastbourne Borough
- Eastbourne Town
- Epsom & Ewell
- Fishbourne
- Godalming Town
- Hastings United
- Horley Town
- Horsham
- Lewes
- Littlehampton Town
- Montpelier Villa
- Peacehaven & Telsombe
- Petersfield Town
- Redhill
- Sidley United
- Steyning Town
- Three Bridges
- Whitehawk
- Worthing

== Defunct clubs ==
Only clubs with articles are listed

- Corps of Signals (1920-1925)
- Langney Wanderers (2010-2021)
- Littlehampton United (2008-2022)
- Ringmer (1963-2018)
- St Leonards (1971-2003)
- Southwick (1882-2020)
- Rye United (1938-2014)
- Withdean (1989–2000)

== Champions ==
=== 1920–1939 ===
The league originally consisted of a single section of 12 clubs, and had reached a stable membership of 14 clubs when it was abandoned on the outbreak of World War II. The fore-runner of the League Cup, known then as the Baldwin Cup (generically Invitation Cup) was introduced in 1938-39 with six teams invited. Lewes were the inaugural final winners beating Littlehampton 5-0 at Newhaven on 6 May 1939.

Season	Champions
1920–21	Worthing
1921–22	Worthing
1922–23	Vernon Athletic
1923–24	Corps of Signals
1924–25	Corps of Signals
1925–26	Southwick
1926–27	Worthing
1927–28	Southwick
1928–29	Worthing
1929–30	Southwick
1930–31	Worthing
1931–32	Horsham
1932–33	Horsham
1933–34	Worthing
1934–35	Horsham
1935–36	Horsham
1936–37	Horsham
1937–38	Horsham
1938–39	Worthing

=== 1939–1941 ===
During the Second World War an emergency competition was played. The league operated two region divisions, East and West, with the winners of each playing in a play-off

Season	Eastern	Western	Play-off Winners	Invitation league cup
1939–40	Hastings & St Leonards	Worthing	Worthing	Lewes
1940–41	No league competitions played			Bognor Regis Town

=== 1945–1946 ===
For the first post-War season, the league also operated two regional divisions, East and West, with the winners of each facing each other in a play-off.

Season	Eastern	Western	Play-off Winners	Invitation league cup
1945–46	Haywards Heath	Worthing	Haywards Heath	Horsham

=== 1946–1952 ===
After a single split format, the league reverted to a single division for the next six seasons.

Season	Champions	Invitation League Cup
1946–47	Horsham	Horsham
1947–48	Southwick	Chichester
1948–49	Bognor Regis	Newhaven
1949–50	Haywards Heath	Bognor Regis
1950–51	Haywards Heath	Eastbourne Comrades
1951–52	Shoreham	East Grinstead

=== 1952–1983 ===
A second division was instituted in 1952. A two-division format continued for over 30 years, the only deviation being in the 1962–63 season when the unusually harsh winter weather made the league impossible to finish. The normal league competitions were abandoned and a set of emergency competitions were played for in the second half of the season.

Season	Division One	Division Two	Invitation League Cup	
1952–53	Shoreham	Wigmore Athletic	Littlehampton Town	
1953–54	Newhaven	Hove White Rovers	Littlehampton Town	
1954–55	Eastbourne United	Three Bridges United	Chichester City	
1955–56	Eastbourne United	Rye United	Bexhill Town Athletic	
1956–57	Bexhill Town Athletic	A P V Athletic	Chichester City	
1957–58	Arundel	Lancing	Shoreham	
1958–59	Arundel	Sidley United	Littlehampton Town & Shoreham (joint)	
1959–60	Chichester City	Old Varndeanians	Wigmore Athletic	
1960–61	Chichester City	Hastings Rangers	Whitehawk	
1961–62	Whitehawk	Shoreham	Littlehampton Town	
1962–63	Normal competitions abandoned - Emergency Competition played		Bognor Regis Town	
1963–64	Whitehawk	Selsey	Chichester City	
1964–65	Lewes	Sidley United	Lancing	
1965–66	Bexhill Town Athletic	Horsham Y M C A	Southwick	
1966–67	Bexhill Town Athletic	Wadhurst		
1967–68	Chichester City	Whitehawk	Horsham Y M C A	
1968–69	Southwick	Ringmer		
1969–70	Haywards Heath	Lancing	Whitehawk	
1970–71	Ringmer	Bognor Regis Town	Three Bridges	
1971–72	Bognor Regis Town	Newhaven	Bognor Regis Town	
1972–73	Chichester City	Portfield	Haywards Heath	
Season	Division One	Division Two	John O'Hara League Cup	Division Two Cup
1973–74	Newhaven	Wigmore Athletic	Burgess Hill Town	Burgess Hill Town
1974–75	Southwick	Burgess Hill Town	Wigmore Athletic	Shoreham
1975–76	Burgess Hill Town	Selsey	Littlehampton Town	Peacehaven & Telscombe
1976–77	Eastbourne Town	Shoreham	Littlehampton Town	Arundel
1977–78	Shoreham	Steyning	Southwick	Crowborough Athletic
1978–79	Peacehaven & Telscombe	Pagham	Steyning	Storrington
1979–80	Chichester City	Hastings Town	Burgess Hill Town	Hastings Town
1980–81	Pagham	Whitehawk	Hastings Town	Whitehawk
1981–82	Peacehaven & Telscombe	Wick	Horsham Y M C A	Lancing
1982–83	Peacehaven & Telscombe	Horsham Y M C A	Whitehawk	Shoreham

=== 1983–2015 ===
After a two division format had proved sufficient for over 30 years, a third division was added in 1983. While the top two divisions were for clubs holding senior status with the Sussex FA, the new Division Three was for clubs of intermediate status.

Season	Division One	Division Two	Division Three	John O'Hara League Cup	Division Two League Cup	Division Three League Cup
1983–84	Whitehawk	Portfield	East Preston	Steyning Town	Haywards Heath Town	Ferring
1984–85	Steyning Town	Shoreham	Oakwood	Littlehampton Town	Chichester City	Bosham
1985–86	Steyning Town	Wick	Seaford Town	Steyning Town	Pagham	Seaford Town
1986–87	Arundel	Pagham	Langney Sports	Arundel	Selsey	Langney Sports
1987–88	Pagham	Langney Sports	Midway	Wick	Chichester City	East Preston
1988–89	Pagham	Seaford Town	Saltdean United	Pagham	Midhurst & Easebourne	Franklands Village
1989–90	Wick	Bexhill Town	Worthing United	Langney Sports	Oakwood	Rottingdean
1990–91	Littlehampton Town	Newhaven	Ifield	Littlehampton Town	Chichester City	Withdean
1991–92	Peacehaven & Telscombe	Portfield	Hassocks	Peacehaven & Telscombe	Redhill	Sidlesham
1992–93	Peacehaven & Telscombe	Crowborough Athletic	Withdean	Peacehaven & Telscombe	Lancing	Franklands Village
1993–94	Wick	Shoreham	Bosham	Whitehawk	Shoreham	Ifield
1994–95	Peacehaven & Telscombe	Mile Oak	Midhurst & Easebourne	Hailsham Town	Horsham Y M C A	East Preston
1995–96	Peacehaven & Telscombe	Saltdean United	Ifield	Shoreham	Selsey	Shinewater Association
1996–97	Burgess Hill Town	Littlehampton Town	Sidlesham	Wick	Sidley United	Buxted
1997–98	Burgess Hill Town	East Preston	Lingfield	Burgess Hill Town	Three Bridges	Storrington
1998–99	Burgess Hill Town	Sidley United	Oving Social Club	Burgess Hill Town	Sidley United	Franklands Village
1999–2000	Langney Sports	Sidlesham	Bosham	Saltdean United	Sidlesham	Bexhill Town
2000–01	Sidley United	Southwick	Rye United	Sidley United	Peacehaven & Telscombe	Haywards Heath Town
2001–02	Burgess Hill Town	Rye & Iden United	Pease Pottage Village	Horsham Y M C A	Rye & Iden United	Crowborough Athletic
2002–03	Burgess Hill Town	Rye & Iden United	Midhurst & Easebourne	Selsey	Rye & Iden United	Midhurst & Easebourne
2003–04	Chichester City United	Littlehampton Town	Crowborough Athletic	Arundel	Littlehampton Town	Crowborough Athletic
2004–05	Horsham Y M C A	Crowborough Athletic	Storrington	Rye & Iden United	Wealden	Rustington
2005–06	Horsham Y M C A	Oakwood	Peacehaven & Telscombe	Shoreham	Mile Oak	Rustington
2006–07	Eastbourne Town	Pagham	Rustington	Crowborough Athletic	Wealden	Pease Pottage Village
2007–08	Crowborough Athletic	East Grinstead Town	Loxwood	Shoreham	Peacehaven & Telscombe	Bexhill United
2008–09	Eastbourne United Association	Peacehaven & Telscombe	Clymping	Whitehawk	Peacehaven & Telscombe	Haywards Heath Town
2009–10	Whitehawk	Rye United	Bosham	Peacehaven & Telscombe	Littlehampton Town	Bosham
2010–11	Crawley Down	A.F.C. Uckfield	Dorking Wanderers	Three Bridges	AFC Uckfield	Saltdean United
2011–12	Three Bridges	East Preston	Newhaven	Three Bridges	East Preston	Ifield
2012–13	Peacehaven & Telscombe	Littlehampton Town	Sidlesham	Peacehaven & Telscombe	Seaford Town	Haywards Heath Town
2013–14	East Preston	Eastbourne United Association	Langney Wanderers	East Preston	Loxwood	Roffey
2014–15	Littlehampton Town	Worthing United	Southwick	Newhaven	Worthing United	Bosham

=== 2015–present ===
In 2015, the Sussex County Football League was re-branded to the Southern Combination Football League, keeping the acronym SCFL. The divisions were renamed to Premier Division, Division One and Division Two, Division Two clubs still holding intermediate status.

Season	Premier Division	Division One	Division Two	Peter Bentley League Cup	Division One League Cup	Division Two League Cup
2015–16	Horsham	Haywards Heath Town	AFC Varndeanians	Lancing	Haywards Heath Town	Bosham
2016–17	Shoreham	Saltdean United	Bosham	Pagham	Langney Wanderers	Sidlesham
2017–18	Haywards Heath Town	Little Common	Rustington	Haywards Heath Town	Little Common	Bosham
2018–19	Chichester City	Alfold	Rustington	Saltdean United	Steyning Town	Rustington
2019–20 ^{1}	No champions. Season abandoned					
2020–21 ^{2}	No champions. Season abandoned					
2021–22	Littlehampton Town	Roffey	Rustington	Littlehampton Town	Midhurst & Easebourne	Charlwood
2022–23	Broadbridge Heath	Shoreham	Jarvis Brook	Newhaven	Godalming Town	Storrington
2023–24	Steyning Town	Roffey	Storrington	Steyning Town	Copthorne	Jarvis Brook
2024–25	Hassocks	Seaford Town	Rustington	Hassocks	Dorking Wanderers B	Jarvis Brook
2025–26	Steyning Town	Godalming Town	Hailsham Town	Steyning Town	AFC Walcountians	Rustington

^{1} The 2019–20 season was terminated on 26 March 2020 due to the coronavirus pandemic
^{2} The 2020-21 was curtailed on 24 February 2021 and a Supplementary Shield was arranged.

== Promoted ==
Since the league's formation, the following clubs have won promotion to higher levels of the English football league system. Crawley Town are currently the only English Football League team to play in the Sussex County League.

Season	Club	Position	Promoted to
1955–56	Eastbourne United	1st	Metropolitan League
1955–56	Crawley	9th (Note: Crawley were playing in Division Two before being promoted.)	Metropolitan League
1964–65	Lewes	1st	Athenian League Division Two
1971–72	Bognor Regis Town	1st	Southern League Division One South
1984–85	Hastings Town	9th	Southern League Southern Division
1995–96	Stamco	2nd	Southern League Southern Division
1999–2000	Langney Sports	1st	Southern League Eastern Division
2002–03	Burgess Hill Town	1st	Southern League Eastern Division
2005–06	Horsham YMCA	1st	Isthmian League Division One South
2006–07	Eastbourne Town	1st	Isthmian League Division One South
2007–08	Crowborough Athletic	1st	Isthmian League Division One South
2008–09	Horsham YMCA	3rd	Isthmian League Division One South
2009–10	Whitehawk	1st	Isthmian League Division One South
2010–11	Crawley Down	1st	Isthmian League Division One South
2011–12	Three Bridges	1st	Isthmian League Division One South
2012–13	Peacehaven & Telscombe	1st	Isthmian League Division One South
2012–13	Redhill	2nd	Isthmian League Division One South
2013–14	East Grinstead Town	2nd	Isthmian League Division One South
2014–15	Dorking Wanderers	2nd	Isthmian League Division One South
2015–16	Horsham	1st	Isthmian League Division One South
2016–17	Shoreham	1st	Isthmian League Division One South
2017–18	Haywards Heath Town	1st	Isthmian League South Division
2017–18	Three Bridges	2nd	Isthmian League South Division
2018–19	Chichester City	1st	Isthmian League South East Division
2020–21	Lancing	(Note: Lancing promoted via a points per game system based on 2019–20 and 2020–21 season results.)	Isthmian League South East Division
2021–22	Littlehampton Town	1st	Isthmian League South East Division
2022–23	Broadbridge Heath	1st	Isthmian League South East Division
2023–24	Steyning Town	1st	Isthmian League South East Division
2023–24	Eastbourne Town	2nd (P)	Isthmian League South East Division
2024–25	Hassocks	1st	Isthmian League South East Division
2024–25	Crowborough Athletic	2nd (P)	Isthmian League South East Division
2025–26	Steyning Town	1st	Isthmian League South East Division
2025–26	Peacehaven & Telscombe	5th (P)	Isthmian League South East Division

P = Via play-offs

== Most championship title wins ==
=== Premier Division (Division One 1952–2015) ===
Club	Wins	Winning years
Horsham	8	1931–32, 1932–33, 1934–35, 1935–36, 1936–37, 1937–38, 1946–47, 2015–16
Peacehaven & Telscombe	8	1978–79, 1981–82, 1982–83, 1991–92, 1992–93, 1994–95, 1995–96, 2012–13
Worthing	8	1920–21, 1921–22, 1926–27, 1928–29, 1930–31, 1933–34, 1938–39, 1939–40
Chichester City	7	1959–60, 1960–61, 1967–68, 1972–73, 1979–80, 2003–04, 2018–19
Burgess Hill Town	6	1975–76, 1996–97, 1997–98, 1998–99, 2001–02, 2002–03
Southwick	6	1925–26, 1927–28, 1929–30, 1948–48, 1968–69, 1974–75
Haywards Heath Town	5	1945–46, 1949–50, 1950–51, 1969–70, 2017–18
Shoreham	4	1951–52, 1952–53, 1977–78, 2016–17
Whitehawk	4	1961–62, 1963–64, 1983–84, 2009–10
Steyning Town Community	4	1984–85, 1985–86, 2023–24, 2025–26
Arundel	3	1957–58, 1958–59, 1986–87
Bexhill United	3	1956–57, 1965–66, 1966–67
Eastbourne United Association	3	1954–55, 1955–56, 2008–09
Littlehampton Town	3	1990–91, 2014–15, 2021–22
Pagham	3	1980–81, 1987–88, 1988–89
Bognor Regis Town	2	1948–49, 1971–72
Corps of Signals	2	1923–24, 1924–25
Eastbourne Town	2	1976–77, 2006–07
Newhaven	2	1953–54, 1973–74
Wick	2	1989–90, 1993–94
Horsham YMCA	2	2004–05, 2005–06
Broadbridge Heath	1	2022–23
Crawley Down Gatwick	1	2010–11
Crowborough Athletic	1	2007–08
East Preston	1	2013–14
Hassocks	1	2024–25
Langney Sports	1	1999–2000
Lewes	1	1964–65
Ringmer	1	1970–71
Sidley United	1	2000–01
Three Bridges	1	2011–12
Vernon Athletic	1	1922–23

=== Division One (Division Two 1952–2015) ===
Club	Wins	Winning years
Shoreham	5	1961–63, 1976–77, 1984–85, 1993–94, 2022–23
Rye United	4	1955–56, 2001–02, 2002–03, 2009–10
Littlehampton Town	3	1996–97, 2003–04, 2012–13
Pagham	3	1978–79, 1986–87, 2006–07
Portfield	3	1972–73, 1983–84, 1991–92
Sidley United	3	1958–59, 1964–65, 1998–99
Crowborough Athletic	2	1992–93, 2004–05
East Preston	2	1997–98, 2011–12
Horsham YMCA	2	1965–66, 1982–83
Lancing	2	1957–58, 1969–70
Newhaven	2	1971–72, 1990–91
Roffey	2	2021–22, 2023–24
Saltdean United	2	1995–96, 2016–17
Seaford Town	2	1988–89, 2024–25
Selsey	2	1963–64, 1975–76
Whitehawk	2	1967–68, 1980–81
Wick	2	1981–82, 1985–86
Wigmore Athletic	2	1952–53, 1973–74
A P V Athletic	1	1956–57
A.F.C. Uckfield	1	2010–11
AFC Varndeanians	1	1959–60
Alfold	1	2018–19
Bexhill United	1	1989–90
Bognor Regis Town	1	1970–71
Burgess Hill Town	1	1974–75
East Grinstead Town	1	2007–08
Eastbourne United Association	1	2013–14
Godalming Town	1	2025–26
Hastings Rangers	1	1960–61
Hastings Town	1	1979–80
Haywards Heath Town	1	2015–16
Hove White Rovers	1	1953–54
Langney Sports	1	1987–88
Little Common	1	2017–18
Mile Oak	1	1994–95
Oakwood	1	2005–06
Peacehaven & Telscombe	1	2008–09
Ringmer	1	1968–69
Sidlesham	1	1999–2000
Southwick	1	2000–01
Steyning	1	1977–78
Three Bridges	1	1954–55
Wadhurst	1	1966–67
Worthing United	1	2014–15

=== Division Two (Division Three 1983–2015) ===
Club	Wins	Winning years
Rustington	5	2006–07, 2017–18, 2018–19, 2021–22, 2024–25
Bosham	4	1993–94, 1999–2000, 2009–10, 2016–17
Ifield	2	1990–91, 1995–96
Midhurst & Easebourne	2	1994–95, 2002–03
Sidlesham	2	1996–97, 2012–13
Storrington	2	2004–05, 2023–24
AFC Varndeanians	1	2015–16
Clymping	1	2008–09
Crowborough Athletic	1	2003–04
Dorking Wanderers	1	2010–11
East Preston	1	1983–84
Hailsham Town	1	2025–26
Hassocks	1	1991–92
Jarvis Brook	1	2022–23
Langney Sports	1	1986–87
Langney Wanderers	1	2013–14
Lingfield	1	1997–98
Loxwood	1	2007–08
Midway	1	1987–88
Newhaven	1	2011–12
Oakwood	1	1984–85
Oving Social Club	1	1998–99
Peacehaven & Telscombe	1	2005–06
Pease Pottage Village	1	2001–02
Rye United	1	2000–01
Saltdean United	1	1988–89
Seaford Town	1	1985–86
Southwick	1	2014–15
Withdean	1	1992–93
Worthing United	1	1989–90
