= A.F.C. Uckfield =

Coordinates: 50°59′43″N 0°05′18″E

AFC Uckfield Town
- Full name: Association Football Club Uckfield
- Nickname(s): The Oaks
- Founded: 1988
- Dissolved: 2014
- Ground: The Oaks, Uckfield
- 2013–14: Sussex County League Division Two, 10th
Home colours

Association Football Club Uckfield was a football club based in Uckfield, East Sussex, England.

== History ==
The club was formed in 1988 as Wealden Football Club. They joined the Sussex County League Division Three in 1998 and finished runners-up in 1999–2000, gaining promotion to Division Two. The club entered the FA Vase for the first time in 2006–07 and reached the first round. In 2010, they were renamed A.F.C. Uckfield and went on to win Division Two in 2010–11, earning promotion to Division One.

In July 2014, they merged with Uckfield Town to form A.F.C. Uckfield Town; the new club adopted Uckfield Town's black and red colours for their home kit and A.F.C. Uckfield's sky blue and navy blue as the away kit, and played at the Oaks.

== Honours ==
- Sussex County League
  - Division Two champions 2010–11

== Records ==
- Best FA Cup performance: Extra preliminary round, 2007–08, 2008–09, 2009–10, 2010–11, 2011–12, 2012–13
- Best FA Vase performance: First round, 2006–07
