= Bosham F.C. =

Association football club in England

- Full name: Bosham Football Club
- Nickname: The Robins
- Founded: 1901
- Ground: Walton Lane, Bosham
- Chairman: Neil Holley-Williams
- Manager: Jack Cavell
- League: Southern Combination Division Two
- 2024–25: Southern Combination Division Two, 13th of 13
- Website: http://www.boshamfc.co.uk
Home colours	Away colours

Bosham F.C. are a football club based in Bosham, near Chichester, West Sussex, England. The club are currently members of the Southern Combination Division Two and play at Walton Lane.

== History ==
Bosham F.C. were formed in 1901 and played in the local football leagues before they joined the Sussex County Football League as founder members of Division Three in 1983. In their second season of the Sussex County Football league the club finished runners-up to Oakwood, winning promotion to Division Two and also winning the Division Three Challenge Cup.

The club remained in Division two for seven seasons when they were relegated back to Division Three at the end of the 1991–92 season. During this period the club made its debut in a national FA competition the FA Vase, when they entered for four seasons in a row from the 1986–87 season, never winning a single game. In the 1993–94 season, the club was promoted back again as champions – albeit a short-live success, as the following two seasons saw successive relegations back to the West Sussex Football League.

Following an overhaul of both players and management, Bosham enjoyed a resurgence on the pitch resulting in one of their most successful seasons ever in 1998–99, winning the coveted ‘treble’ of the West Sussex Football League Premier Division; Malcolm Simmonds Cup and the Centenary Cup – a feat no other club has achieved. This success enabled the club to re-join the Sussex County Football league again in Division Three.

The first season back in the Sussex County league saw Bosham champions of Division three once again, scoring 109 goals along the way – an average of 3.6 per game. The Robins found themselves bottom of Division two again two seasons after promotion and ‘yo-yoed’ back down to Division Three.

The club struggled back at Intermediate level, but a late revival saw them finish one place off the bottom, five points clear of Uckfield Town. Although a relegation position, the resignation of Oving – coupled with only Wadhurst United meeting the requirements for promotion – spared them the drop.

Until the 2006–07 season – a year when Bosham were again reprieved after a picking up the Division Three wooden spoon – there had been signs of improvement, with the club appearing reasonably comfortable in Division Three after many up and down seasons; and in 2004–05, reached the Final of the Sussex Intermediate Cup, where they were defeated by Rustington.

Cup success again afforded the Walton Lane side in 2008–09 when they were beaten by a solitary goal to nil against fellow Division Three side, Forest, in the final of the same trophy.

However Bosham did find the winning formula the following season, drafting in a largely youthful squad alongside one or two more experienced heads, to lead the club to the Division Three title for the third time; the Division Three Challenge Cup, and the Team of the Year award.

Unfortunately, heightened league ground grading regulations were to this time go against Bosham and they were denied a place back in senior football. Despite this knock, the club managed to keep the majority of the team that earned their top spot the previous season, and gallantly went on to finish in fourth place in 2010–11.

In September 2011, Bosham won a £20,000 sponsorship deal with home improvement retailer, Wickes, and featured in national newspaper, The Sun. The prize was a welcome boost for the village club, who had previously struggled for funding and local volunteers. Bosham fought off 300 other non-league clubs to win the competition, with club captain Ben Blanshard writing 250 words as to why they deserved it. The windfall funded a make over for the changing rooms, new kit, training equipment and coaching.

After encouragingly winning six of their opening nine league games of the 2011–12 campaign, a changeable Bosham side saw their season ebb out, as they finished below mid-table. However at the end of that season, the club were demoted back to the West Sussex Football League as their ground did not meet the requirements to carry on playing in the Sussex County League.

Under the guidance of Tony Hancock, the Robins finished in third place in their return season in West Sussex Premier Division, with the title eventually going to Cowfold after being keenly fought out until the last weekend. Despite a positive start to the 2013/14 campaign, Hancock ended his ten-year reign in charge of The Robins, with long-serving player Andy Probee taking over the role in November 2013.

Bosham were soon back on track, with Probee's side winning an impressive 13 of their remaining 16 games to take the West Sussex Premier Division title for a second time, and with it, gain promotion back to Division 3 of the Sussex County League. Sadly, Probee lost his grandad – and Bosham Vice-president – Dennis, a week before the end of the season, so it was perhaps fitting that the club should win the League shortly after. The inaugural Dennis Probee Memorial Cup was set up in his honour, with Bosham facing a 'Sussex XI' side, winning 4–3 on penalties after the sides were tied 2–2 in normal time.

2013/14 was also a great season for the club off the field, with Bosham successfully applying for Sport England funding, enabling the club to modernise their facilities and increase participation with new youth sides planned for 2014/15. The season also saw Bosham gain their FA Charter Standard status.

Bosham made their return to the Sussex County League in 2014/15, finishing their first season back in a creditable fourth spot in Division 3, having featured at the top of the division for much the season, following a blistering start that saw the club win its first six games. Silverware was to follow, as the Robins lifted the Division 3 Cup for a third time, with a 3–0 victory over local rivals, Sidlesham. Football Foundation funding supported the reintroduction of the club's youth section at under 16 level, with a further youth team at under 15 level added in 2015/16. The club were also winners at the Sussex Sports Awards.

In February 2016, Bosham gained a further grant from West Sussex County Council's 'Big Society Fund' in the sum of £10,400 to improve club facilities and infrastructure, and assist with longer-term sustainability and youth participation objectives.

Success on the pitch in 2015/16 again came in the form of the (renamed) SCFL Division 2 Cup – with a 2–1 win over League champions, AFC Varndeanians. The Robins became the first side to retain the trophy since its inception in 1983/84. The season also brought a sixth-place finish in the newly formed Southern Combination League Division 2.

The Robins came back stronger in 2016/17, winning the SCFL Division Two title having led the table for all but the opening two weeks of the season. At the end of the 2016/17 manager Andy Probee stepped down, with former Petersfield Town Director of Football, Gary Lines, appointed to lead the club from 2017/18. The club once again tasted success in the SCFL Division Two Cup in Lines' first season in charge, beating Rustington 1–0 at Pagham, courtesy of a late Matt Andrews goal – for their third League Cup triumph in four seasons.

Danny Mullen and Tony Hancock took-up joint charge of a new-look Bosham side into 2018/19 after Lines' departure in the summer, with Hancock taking sole charge to lead the Robins once again a season later, for the start of 2019/20.

Former captain, James Wilson, returned to the club following a coaching spell at Portsmouth Women, to become Joint Manager with Tony Hancock, ahead of the 2022/23 campaign, with a number of promising younger players from the youth set-up now established first team members.

One starlet, Lewis Rustell, struck 24 in 26 helping Bosham to a fifth-placed finish. Rustell would go on to feature for both Chichester City and Moneyfields at Steps 3 and 4 respectively. This was followed-up with a runners-up spot in 2023/24, pulling off somewhat of a coup to attract former Portsmouth striker, Ashley Harris, who returned 22 goals in 21 appearances for the Robins.

Contrasting fortunes in 2024/25 with many of the previous seasons' squad pursuing football ambitions at higher levels, saw Bosham conclude with the wooden spoon in Division Two, thankfully reprieved from relegation.

The Robins avoided bottom spot in another season of struggle on the pitch in 2025/26, which led to long-serving manager, Tony Hancock's resignation in March.

Jack Cavell was announced as the new manager in April 2026, following a successful period at Selsey's Reserves in the West Sussex League.

The club continues its youth development and player pathway programs. A sponsorship deal with David Wilson Homes began at the start of 2025/26.

Although Bosham have never competed in the FA Cup, they were entrants to the FA Vase between 1986 and 1990.

== Ground ==
Bosham play their games at The Recreation Ground, Walton Lane, Bosham, PO18 8QF.

== Club honours ==
=== League honours ===
- Southern Combination Football League Division Two
  - Winners (1) 2016/17
- Sussex County Football League Division Three:
  - Winners (3): 1993–94, 1999–00, 2009–10,
  - Runners-up (1): 1984–85
- West Sussex Football League Premier Division:
  - Winners (2): 1998–99, 2013–14
- West Sussex Football League Division One:
  - Winners (1): 1977–78

=== Cup honours ===
- Southern Combination Football League Division Two Cup:
  - Winners (2): 2015–16; 2017–18
- Sussex County Football League Division Three Cup:
  - Winners (3): 1984–85, 2009–10, 2014–15
  - Runners up (1): 1992–93
- Sussex Intermediate Cup:
  - Runners-up (2): 2004–05, 2008–09
- Malcolm Simmonds Memorial Cup:
  - Winners (1): 1998–99
- West Sussex Football League Centenary Cup:
  - Winners (1): 1998–99

== Club records ==
- Highest League Position: 7th in Sussex County League Division Two 1985–86, 1994–95
- FA Vase best performance: Preliminary Qualifying Round 1987–88, 1988–89

== Season-by-season record since 1983 ==
League

Season	League	Pld	W	D	L	GF	GA	Pts	Pos
1983–84	Sussex County League Division Three	24	11	5	8	50	38	38	4/13
1984–85	Sussex County League Division Three	28	18	7	3	80	36	61	2/15
1985–86	Sussex County League Division Two	30	12	7	11	56	53	43	7/16
1986–87	Sussex County League Division Two	30	12	6	12	48	55	42	8/16
1987–88	Sussex County League Division Two	28	5	6	17	36	68	21	14/15
1988–89	Sussex County League Division Two	26	7	6	13	32	60	27	11/14
1989–90	Sussex County League Division Two	30	7	8	15	33	59	29	13/16
1990–91	Sussex County League Division Two	30	12	6	12	50	53	42	9/16
1991–92	Sussex County League Division Two	32	7	5	20	41	106	26	16/17
1992–93	Sussex County League Division Three	26	15	4	7	52	51	49	3/14
1993–94	Sussex County League Division Three	30	19	5	6	69	33	62	1/16
1994–95	Sussex County League Division Two	34	15	7	12	71	57	52	7/18
1995–96	Sussex County League Division Two	34	10	4	20	65	103	34	17/18
1996–97	Sussex County League Division Two	34	6	2	26	46	107	20	17/18
1997–98	Sussex County League Division Three	30	2	6	22	27	95	12	16/16
1998–99	West Sussex League Premier Division	14	11	1	2	57	22	34	1/8
1999–2000	Sussex County League Division Three	30	24	3	3	109	36	75	1/16
2000–01	Sussex County League Division Two	34	13	6	15	48	73	45	10/18
2001–02	Sussex County League Division Two	34	2	4	28	31	125	13	18/18
2002–03	Sussex County League Division Three	28	6	3	19	30	102	21	14/15
2003–04	Sussex County League Division Three	26	10	2	14	43	55	32	10/14
2004–05	Sussex County League Division Three	24	10	6	8	45	39	36	7/13
2005–06	Sussex County League Division Three	26	9	5	12	44	58	29	10/14
2006–07	Sussex County League Division Three	24	2	3	19	29	70	9	13/13
2007–08	Sussex County League Division Three	24	7	2	15	35	45	23	10/13
2008–09	Sussex County League Division Three	26	7	5	14	35	53	26	10/14
2009–10	Sussex County League Division Three	28	20	4	4	64	29	64	1/15
2010–11	Sussex County League Division Three	30	17	4	9	73	55	55	4/16
2011–12	Sussex County League Division Three	30	9	6	15	45	58	33	11/16
2012–13	West Sussex League Premier Division	22	12	5	5	45	25	41	3/12
2013–14	West Sussex League Premier Division	22	15	4	3	68	32	49	1/12
2014–15	Sussex County League Division Three	20	12	2	6	51	24	35*	4/11
2015–16	Southern Combination Football League Division Two	30	18	5	7	70	27	59	6/16
2016–17	Southern Combination Football League Division Two	28	21	4	3	102	24	67	1/15
2017–18	Southern Combination Football League Division Two	26	14	5	7	62	43	47	5/14
2018–19	Southern Combination Football League Division Two	28	11	3	14	50	67	36	10/15
2019–20	Southern Combination Football League Division Two	20*	6	1	13	30	76	19	11/14
2020–21	Southern Combination Football League Division Two	10*	2	2	6	15	25	8	11/14
2021–22	Southern Combination Football League Division Two	24	9	2	13	43	54	29	11/13
2022–23	Southern Combination Football League Division Two	26	14	4	8	58	50	46	5/14
2023–24	Southern Combination Football League Division Two	22	14	3	5	67	36	45	2/12
2024–25	Southern Combination Football League Division Two	24	2	1	21	23	113	7	13/13
2025–26	Southern Combination Football League Division Two	28	3	5	20	21	80	14	14/15

- 2019-20/ 2020-21 all records expunged - season abandoned

=== F.A. Vase complete record ===
Season	Round	Opponent	H/A	Score
1986–87	EP	Farleigh Rovers	H	1–2
1987–88	PRE	Burgess Hill Town	A	1–1
	Replay	Burgess Hill Town	H	0–4
1988–89	PRE	Eastleigh	A	1–3
1989–90	EP	Bedfont	A	1–6
