= Fishbourne F.C. =

Association football club in England

Coordinates: 50.837°N 0.818°W

Fishbourne
- Full name: Fishbourne Football Club
- Founded: 1921
- Ground: Fishbourne Centre, Fishbourne
- League: West Sussex League Premier Division
- 2024–25: West Sussex League Premier Division, 6th of 11

Sidlesham Football Club logo

Fishbourne Football Club is a football club based in Sidlesham, near Chichester, West Sussex, England. Originally named Sidlesham Football Club and based in Sidlesham, they are currently members of the West Sussex League Premier Division play at the Fishbourne Centre in Fishbourne.

== History ==
Sidlesham Football Club was formed in 1921 but folded in the 1930s due to financial problems. They reformed immediately after World War II. In 1991 they joined the Sussex County League Division Three and in 1997, won the title and were promoted to Division Two. Two years later, after winning Division Two, they reached the top division, finishing fifth in 2002–03, the same season they recorded their best effort in the FA Vase when they got to the Second Round. However, they finished bottom of Division One two seasons later and were then relegated from Division Two in 2008–09, finishing mid-table in 2009–10 in Division Three. Two seasons later they finished bottom of Division Three and were relegated to the West Sussex League, but they were promoted straight back up to the Sussex County League Division Three, after finishing second in the West Sussex League. The Sids were crowned Division Three champions in 2012–13, but the club did not obtain promotion. The 2013–14 season brought a fifth-place finish, but they earned promotion to a renamed Division One after finishing runners-up in 2014–15.

Despite finishing mid-table in Division One in 2015–16, Sidlesham were relegated to Division Two. They were runners-up in the Division in 2017–18, but resigned from the league in 2019–20 after losing their home ground. The club subsequently rejoined the West Sussex League, entering the Championship South. They won the division in 2021–22 and were promoted to the Premier Division. After relocating to Fishbourne, the club were renamed Fishbourne Football Club.

== Ground ==
Sidlesham played their home games at the Recreation Ground on Selsey Road in Sidlesham. In 2019 the club were made homeless when their ground-lease agreement with the parish council was terminated. They later moved to the Fishbourne Centre in Fishbourne

== Honours ==
- Sussex County League
  - Division Two champions 1999–2000
  - Division Three champions 1996–97, 2012–13
- West Sussex League
  - Premier Division champions 2011–12
  - Championship South champions 2021–22
  - Division One champions 1963–64
  - Division Three Cup winners 1991–92

== Records ==
- Best FA Cup performance: Preliminary round, 2003–04, 2004–05, 2005–06
- Best FA Vase performance: Second round, 2002–03
