= Royal School of Signals =

11th (The Royal School of Signals) Signals Regiment
- Regiment badge
- Active: 1869 – present
- Country: United Kingdom
- Branch: British Army
- Type: Training regiment
- Role: Communications and information systems training
- Part of: Royal Corps of Signals; Defence School of Communications and Information Systems
- Garrison/HQ: Blandford Camp, Dorset
- Website: Official website

The Royal School of Signals is a military training establishment that is part of the United Kingdom's Defence School of Communications and Information Systems. It is at Blandford Camp in Dorset. The soldiers and officers who are attending courses at the school are assigned to the 11th Signal Regiment, the training regiment of the Royal Corps of Signals.

== History ==
The school was founded in 1869 at Chatham in Kent as the Signal Wing of the Royal School of Military Engineering. It moved to Houghton Regis in Bedfordshire in 1915, Maresfield Park in Sussex in 1920, Catterick Camp in North Yorkshire in 1925 and Blandford Camp in Dorset in 1967. It became the Royal School of Signals in 1992.

== Composition ==
The current units controlled by the school include:

- 11th (Royal Corps of Signals) Signal Regiment, Royal Corps of Signals (only 4 squadrons present and one affiliate squadron)
  - Regimental Headquarters
  - 1 (Fowler) Squadron (Part of 2 Army Training Regiment), at ATC Pirbright
  - 2 (Catterick) Squadron
  - 3 (Harrogate) Squadron
  - 4 (Military Training) Squadron
  - 5 (Maresfield) Squadron

== Training ==
The school includes the home of the Cadet Forces Signals Training Team (CFSTT).

== Notable commanding officers ==
- Ashley Truluck (1990–1993)

== See also ==
- Units of the Royal Corps of Signals
