= Uckfield Town F.C. =

Coordinates: 50°57′51.72″N 0°05′35.68″E

Uckfield Town
- Full name: Uckfield Town Football Club
- Nickname(s): The Oakmen
- Founded: 1880
- Dissolved: 2014
- Ground: Victoria Recreation Ground; Uckfield
- Capacity: 300
- 2013–14: Sussex County League; Division Three; 4th/11, 33pts
Home colours	Away colours

Uckfield Town F.C. was a football club based in Uckfield, East Sussex, England. For their final season, 2013–14, they were members of the Sussex County League (since renamed Southern Combination League), Division Three. They had four sides that play on Saturdays. They merged with second division club AFC Uckfield to create AFC Uckfield Town for the 2014-15 season and earned promotion in the merger's first year, starting the following season in the renamed league's renamed Division One, which became the Premier Division (Division Two became Division One).

== History ==
The club was formed in 1881. They joined the Sussex County League Division Two in 1955, however the highest they ever finished was fourth and the club was relegated from the league in 1966, joining the Mid-Sussex Football League. During their time in this league, Uckfield were champions of Division Three in 1982–83, Division Two in 1990–91, Division One in 1994–95, and the Premier Division in 1995–96, gaining promotion back to the Sussex County League at Division Three level. Uckfield finished fourth in the County League Division Three in 2004–05, their highest placing in the league. Under the guidance of Adam Michaels, they reached the Sussex Intermediate Cup Final in the 2006–07 season, but lost 2–1 in extra-time to Pease Pottage.

== Colours and nickname ==
Their home colours are red and black shirts, with black shorts and black and red hooped socks. The club's nickname is "The Oakmen" – this is derived from the club motto "corda quercus" which in Latin means "hearts of oak".

== Ground ==
The club played their home games at Victoria Pleasure Grounds, Old Timbers Lane, Uckfield TN22 5DJ.

== Honours ==
=== League honours ===
- Mid-Sussex Football League Premier Division
  - Champions (1): 1995–96
- Mid-Sussex Football League Division One
  - Champions (1): 1994–95
- Mid-Sussex Football League Division Two
  - Champions (1): 1990–91
- Mid-Sussex Football League Division Three
  - Champions (1): 1982–83

=== Cup honours ===
- Sussex Intermediate Cup
  - Runners-up (1): 2006–07
- Sussex County League Division Three League Cup
  - Runners-up (2): 1997–98, 2003–04

== Records ==
- Highest League Position: 4th in Sussex League Division Two 1957–58
