= Lewes F.C. =

Association football club in Sussex, England

Lewes
- Full name: Lewes Football Club
- Nickname: The Rooks
- Founded: 1885
- Ground: The Dripping Pan, Lewes
- Capacity: 3,000
- Chairman: Trevor Wells
- Manager: Craig Nelson
- League: Isthmian League Premier Division
- 2025–26: Isthmian League Premier Division, 17th of 22
- Website: lewesfc.com
Home colours	Away colours

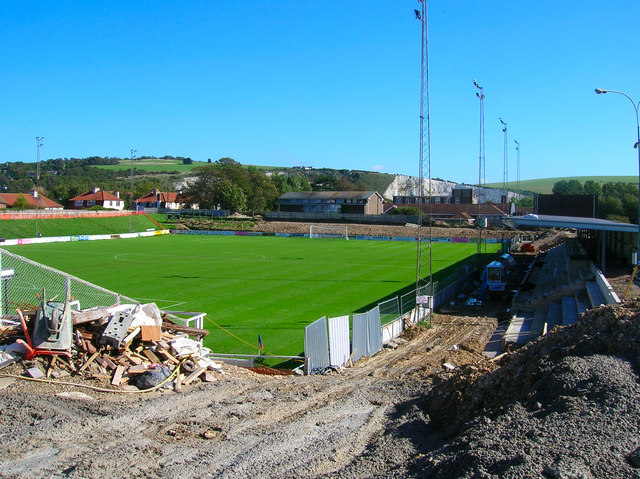
Redevelopment work under way at The Dripping Pan

Lewes Football Club is a semi-professional football club based in Lewes, East Sussex, England. Established in 1885, they were founder members of the East Sussex League in 1896 and the Sussex County League in 1920, before moving up to the Athenian League in 1965 and then the Isthmian League in the 1977. After being founder members of the Conference South in 2004, they were promoted to the Conference National, the fifth tier of English football, in 2007. However, they were relegated back to the Conference South after a single season, and were later relegated to the Isthmian League in 2011.

The club have played at the Dripping Pan since their foundation. The men's first team are currently members of the Isthmian League Premier Division, while the women's team play in the FA Women's National League South.

== History ==
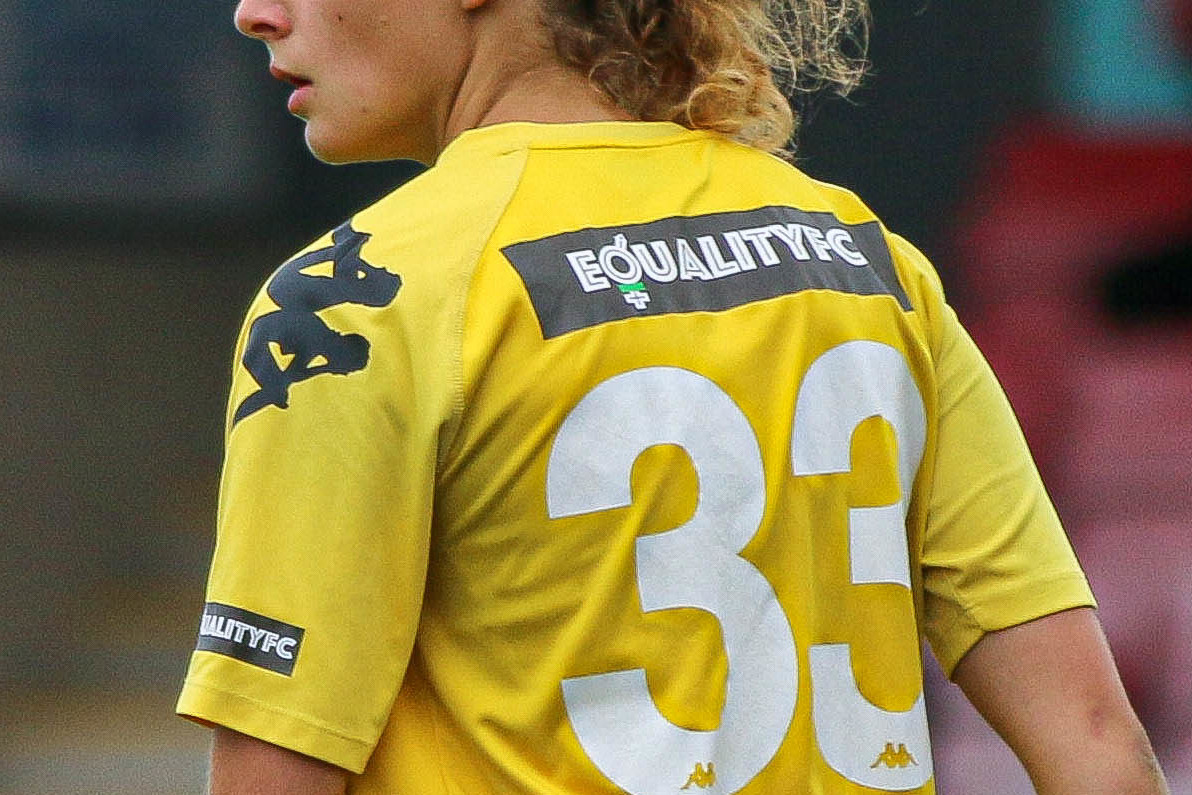
Lewes dubbed themselves "Equality FC" to support gender awareness in football

The club was established in a meeting at the Royal Oak pub on 23 September 1885. In 1896 they were founder members of the East Sussex League. The club finished bottom of the league in 1898–99 and again the following season. The league was expanded to two divisions in 1899, with Lewes placed in the Senior Division, going on to finish last for a third consecutive season. After finishing bottom of the Senior Division again in 1900–01 without winning a match, the club left the league. They later joined the Mid-Sussex League, entering its Senior Division in 1905. The club were Senior Division runners-up in 1907–08 and again in 1909–10 before winning the league in 1910–11.

Lewes then left the Mid-Sussex League for a reformed East Sussex League, and were runners-up in 1912–13. Although they finished bottom of the East Sussex League the following season, the club also played in the Mid-Sussex League and won the league title. After World War I they spent the 1919–20 season in the Brighton, Hove & District League. In 1920 they were founder members of the Sussex County League. The club were runners-up in 1924–25 and again in 1933–34 and 1958–59, also winning the League Cup in 1938–39.

After finishing as runners-up in 1963–64, Lewes won the Sussex County League title the following season and moved up to Division Two of the Athenian League. They were Division Two champions in 1967–68, earning promotion to Division One. After a third-place finish in their first season in Division One, the club won the division the following season (on goal average) and were promoted to the Premier Division. In 1977 they transferred to Division Two of the Isthmian League, in which they finished as runners-up in 1979–80 to earn promotion to Division One.

Lewes remained in Division One of the Isthmian League until being relegated to Division Two at the end of the 1990–91 season. Although they were promoted back to Division One the following season after finishing as runners-up in Division Two, they were relegated again in 1992–93 and again in 1993–94, dropping into Division Three. The club were Division Three runners-up in 2000–01 and were promoted to Division Two. The following season saw the club reach the first round of the FA Cup for the first time; drawn at home to Stoke City, the match was moved to the Britannia Stadium with Stoke winning 2–0. The club finished the season by winning the Division Two title to secure promotion to Division One South;

After winning the Division One South title in 2003–04, Lewes entered a series of play-offs for promotion to the newly formed Conference South; they defeated Yeading 1–0, Basingstoke Town 4–1 and Kingstonian 1–0 to earn a place in the new sixth tier division. Although the club finished fourth in the Conference South in its inaugural season, they were prevented from taking part in the promotion play-offs as the Dripping Pan did not meet the standards required for the Conference National. Another fourth-place finish in 2005–06 saw the club again denied the opportunity to participate in the play-offs.

In 2006–07 Lewes reached the first round of the FA Cup again, losing 4–1 at home to Darlington. The following season saw another first round appearance, ending in a 3–0 defeat at Mansfield Town. After winning the Conference South title at the end of the season, the club were promoted to the Conference National, having carried out works on the Dripping Pan. However, after winning the title, manager Steve King and all-but-one of the first team squad left the club. The following season saw them finish bottom of the Conference National, resulting in relegation back to the Conference South. In 2010 the club was bought for £1 by six fans and turned into a community-owned initiative.

In 2010–11 Lewes were relegated to the Premier Division of the Isthmian League, where they played until being relegated to Division One South at the end of the 2015–16 season. In July 2017 the club became the first professional or semi-professional football club to pay its women's team the same as its men's team. They were Division One South runners-up in 2017–18, earning promotion back to the Premier Division.

The club has been playing in the Isthmian Premier Division ever since, most recently finishing 17th in the 2025-26 season.

== Stadium ==
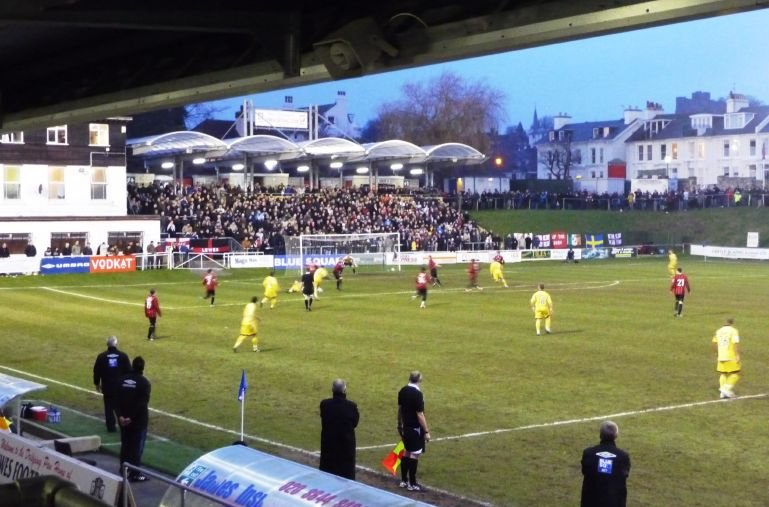
The Dripping Pan. Lewes vs Eastbourne Borough on 1 January 2009

The club have played at the Dripping Pan since their formation, although they temporarily relocated to the Convent Field adjacent to the Dripping Pan for the two seasons immediately before World War I.

== Club staff ==
Position	Name
Club Management
Manager	Craig Nelson
Assistant Manager	Bryan Nzinga
Assistant Manager	David Altendorff
First Team Coach	Elyon Marshall-Katung
Goalkeeper Coach	Sheikh Ceesay
Physio	Daniel Kusimo
Data Analyst	Dan McDonnell
First Team Logistics Lead	Lewis Robinson
Board
Chairman	Trevor Wells
Directors	Jim Cheek
Directors	Lisa Emery
Directors	Ben Hall
Directors	Stan Lahood
Directors	John Peel
Club Secretary; Match Secretary	John Peel

== Honours ==
- National League
  - Conference South champions 2007–08
- Isthmian League
  - Division One South champions 2003–04
  - Division Two champions 2001–02
- Athenian League
  - Division 1 champions 1969–70
  - Division 2 champions 1967–68
- Sussex County League
  - Champions 1964–65
  - League Cup winners 1938–39
- Mid-Sussex League
  - Champions 1910–11, 1913–14
  - Montgomery Cup winners 1908–09, 1910–11
- Sussex Senior Challenge Cup
  - Winners 1964–65, 1970–71, 1984–85, 2000–01, 2005–06
- Sussex RUR Cup
  - Winners 1961–62, 1962–63, 1964–65
- Sussex Floodlight Cup
  - Winners 1976–77
- Supporters Direct Shield
  - Winners 2012–13

== Records ==
- Best FA Cup performance: First round, 2001–02, 2006–07, 2007–08
- Best FA Trophy performance: Third round, 2002–03, 2003–04
- Best FA Vase performance: Quarter-finals, 2001–02
- Best FA Amateur Cup performance: Second round, 1967–68
- Record attendance: 2,500 vs Newhaven, Sussex County League, 26 December 1947
- Most appearances: Terry Parris, 662
- Most goals: Pip Parris, 350
- Record transfer fee paid: £2,000 for Matt Allen

== See also ==
- Lewes F.C. players
- Lewes F.C. managers
- Lewes F.C. Women
- Football in Sussex
