= Chichester City F.C. (1873) =

English football club

Coordinates: 50°50′33.040″N 0°46′31.480″W

Chichester City
- Full name: Chichester City Football Club
- Nickname(s): Lillywhites
- Founded: 1873
- Dissolved: 2000
- Ground: Oaklands Park, Chichester
Home colours

Chichester City Football Club was a football club based in Chichester, England. Established in 1873, they merged with Portfield in 2000 to form Chichester City United, later renamed Chichester City.

== History ==
The club was established in 1873 as Chichester Football Club. They were founder members of the Sussex County Football Association in 1882, and later became founder members of the West Sussex League in 1896. In 1920 the club were founder members of another new league, the Sussex County League.

In 1925–26 Chichester won the Sussex Senior Challenge Cup, beating Eastbourne 5–1 in the final. After World War II the club spent one season in the West Sussex League, winning the Division One title and Malcolm Simmonds Memorial Cup, before returning the Sussex County League when it resumed in 1946. In 1948 the club was renamed Chichester City. They won the Sussex County League in 1959–60, retaining their title the following season. In 1960–61 the club reached the first round of the FA Cup for the first and only time in their history, losing 11–0 at Bristol City. They also reached the Sussex RUR Cup final, and after drawing 2–2 with Brighton & Hove Albion, were jointly awarded the cup; they went on to win the RUR Cup outright in 1963–64. After finishing as league runners-up in 1965–66 and 1966–67, they were champions again in 1967–68. The club were runners-up in 1969–70 and champions for a fourth time in 1972–73.

After several seasons of lower-mid table finishes in the mid-1970s, Chichester were champions again in 1979–80. However, the next few years saw them become a yo-yo club; they were relegated to Division Two at the end of the 1982–83 season, having finished bottom of Division One. Although they returned to Division One in 1985 after finishing as Division Two runners-up, they were relegated again at the end of the 1986–87 season. The club were promoted back to Division One as Division Two runners-up in 1990–91, but were relegated for a third time in 1993–94 after finishing bottom of Division One. In 1995–96 the club finished in the promotion positions, but were denied promotion as Oakland Park did not have floodlights. In 1996–97 they were Division Two runners-up again, earning promotion back to Division One after floodlights had been installed.

In 2000 Chichester merged with Portfield to form Chichester City United, playing at Portfield's Church Road ground whilst Oaklands Park was redeveloped.

== Colours ==
The club wore white shirts and socks, originally with blue shorts and later with black.

== Ground ==
The club originally played at Priory Park, before moving to Oaklands Park in the early 1950s.

== Honours ==
- Sussex County League
  - Champions 1959–60, 1960–61, 1967–68, 1972–73, 1979–80
  - Division Two Challenge Cup winners 1984–85, 1987–88, 1990–91
- West Sussex League
  - Division One champions 1945–46
  - Malcolm Simmonds Memorial Cup winners 1945–46
- Sussex Senior Challenge Cup
  - Winners 1925–26
- Sussex RUR Cup
  - Winners 1960–61 (joint), 1963–64

== Records ==
- Best FA Cup performance: First round, 1960–61
- Best FA Vase performance: Fourth round, 1995–96
- Biggest victory: 21–1 vs Boxgrove Youth Club, West Sussex League, 8 December 1945

== See also ==
- Chichester City F.C. players
