= 1989–90 Sussex County Football League =

The 1989–90 Sussex County Football League season was the 65th in the history of Sussex County Football League a football competition in England.

== Division One ==
Sussex County Football League Division One
- Season: 1989–90
- Champions: Wick
- Relegated: Lancing; Redhill
- Matches: 306
- Goals: 911 (2.98 per match)

Division One featured 16 clubs which competed in the division last season, along with two new clubs, promoted from Division Two:

- Ringmer
- Seaford Town

Also, Haywards Heath changed name to Haywards Heath Town.

=== League table ===
Pos	Team	Pld	W	D	L	GF	GA	GD	Pts	Qualification or relegation
1	Wick	34	25	4	5	88	30	+58	79	
2	Littlehampton Town	34	24	4	6	65	22	+43	76	
3	Langney Sports	34	20	6	8	63	33	+30	66	
4	Burgess Hill Town	34	18	8	8	68	38	+30	62	
5	Peacehaven & Telscombe	34	15	8	11	44	33	+11	53	
6	Whitehawk	34	16	4	14	45	41	+4	52	
7	Three Bridges	34	13	12	9	61	38	+23	51	
8	Pagham	34	15	6	13	53	46	+7	51	
9	Shoreham	34	14	5	15	58	65	−7	47	
10	Ringmer	34	11	8	15	48	64	−16	41	
11	Seaford Town	34	12	4	18	43	58	−15	40	
12	Haywards Heath Town	34	11	7	16	47	69	−22	40	
13	Hailsham Town	34	9	11	14	41	54	−13	38	
14	Selsey	34	9	9	16	45	63	−18	36	
15	Eastbourne Town	34	9	8	17	42	58	−16	35	
16	Arundel	34	9	7	18	33	56	−23	34	
17	Lancing	34	8	9	17	43	68	−25	33	Relegated to Division Two
18	Redhill	34	6	4	24	24	75	−51	22	Relegated to Division Two

Source: nonleaguematters
Rules for classification: 1) points; 2) goal difference; 3) number of goals scored.

== Division Two ==
Sussex County Football League Division Two
- Season: 1989–90
- Champions: Bexhill Town
- Promoted: Bexhill Town; Oakwood
- Relegated: Ferring; Storrington
- Matches: 240
- Goals: 741 (3.09 per match)

Division Two featured eleven clubs which competed in the division last season, along with five new clubs.

- Clubs relegated from Division One:
  - Oakwood
  - Portfield
- Clubs promoted from Division Three:
  - Franklands Village
  - Saltdean United
  - Stamco

=== League table ===
Pos	Team	Pld	W	D	L	GF	GA	GD	Pts	Qualification or relegation
1	Bexhill Town	30	22	3	5	76	20	+56	69	Promoted to Division One
2	Oakwood	30	20	3	7	74	27	+47	60 (Note: Oakwood were deducted three points.)	Promoted to Division One
3	Chichester City	30	18	3	9	57	26	+31	57	
4	Portfield	30	17	5	8	49	36	+13	56	
5	Horsham YMCA	30	16	3	11	42	31	+11	51	
6	Stamco	30	15	4	11	60	38	+22	49	
7	Crowborough Athletic	30	15	4	11	38	36	+2	49	
8	Saltdean United	30	13	7	10	42	45	−3	46	
9	Broadbridge Heath	30	13	4	13	55	53	+2	43	
10	Franklands Village	30	10	8	12	52	52	0	38	
11	Newhaven	30	9	8	13	36	40	−4	35	
12	Midhurst & Easebourne	30	9	6	15	42	45	−3	33	
13	Bosham	30	7	8	15	33	59	−26	29	
14	Little Common Albion	30	7	8	15	34	62	−28	29	
15	Ferring	30	4	6	20	32	80	−48	18	Relegated to Division Three
16	Storrington	30	2	6	22	19	91	−72	12	Relegated to Division Three

Source: nonleaguematters
Rules for classification: 1) points; 2) goal difference; 3) number of goals scored.

== Division Three ==
Sussex County Football League Division Three
- Season: 1989–90
- Champions: Worthing United
- Promoted: Worthing United; Sidley United
- Matches: 182
- Goals: 607 (3.34 per match)

Division Three featured ten clubs which competed in the division last season, along with four new clubs:

- Buxted
- East Grinstead, relegated from Division Two
- Town Mead
- Withdean

Also, Falcons changed name to Rottingdean.

=== League table ===
Pos	Team	Pld	W	D	L	GF	GA	GD	Pts	Qualification or relegation
1	Worthing United	26	20	4	2	82	29	+53	64	Promoted to Division Two
2	Sidley United	26	15	3	8	62	36	+26	48	Promoted to Division Two
3	Mile Oak	26	13	8	5	69	49	+20	47	
4	Hassocks	26	12	8	6	43	26	+17	44	
5	East Grinstead	26	11	7	8	33	31	+2	40	
6	Hurstpierpoint	26	11	6	9	44	39	+5	39	
7	Rottingdean	26	9	7	10	50	45	+5	34	
8	East Preston	26	9	5	12	45	48	−3	32	
9	Forest	26	7	11	8	36	40	−4	32	
10	Leftovers Sports Club	26	7	7	12	29	51	−22	28	
11	Town Mead	26	6	8	12	24	46	−22	26	Resigned from the league
12	Buxted	26	5	9	12	41	55	−14	24	
13	Ifield	26	5	7	14	24	63	−39	22	
14	Withdean	26	4	6	16	25	49	−24	18	

Source: nonleaguematters
Rules for classification: 1) points; 2) goal difference; 3) number of goals scored.
