= 1988–89 Sussex County Football League =

The 1988–89 Sussex County Football League season was the 64th in the history of Sussex County Football League a football competition in England.

== Division One ==
Sussex County Football League Division One
- Season: 1988–89
- Champions: Pagham
- Relegated: Oakwood; Portfield
- Matches: 306
- Goals: 905 (2.96 per match)

Division One featured 15 clubs which competed in the division last season, along with three new clubs:

- Langney Sports, promoted from Division Two
- Oakwood, promoted from Division Two
- Redhill, transferred from the Spartan League

=== League table ===
Pos	Team	Pld	W	D	L	GF	GA	GD	Pts	Qualification or relegation
1	Pagham	34	25	6	3	83	33	+50	81	
2	Three Bridges	34	19	9	6	70	29	+41	66	
3	Whitehawk	34	19	8	7	55	32	+23	65	
4	Hailsham Town	34	16	10	8	55	33	+22	58	
5	Burgess Hill Town	34	17	5	12	54	41	+13	56	
6	Wick	34	13	11	10	50	40	+10	50	
7	Littlehampton Town	34	14	8	12	43	33	+10	50	
8	Peacehaven & Telscombe	34	14	8	12	48	41	+7	50	
9	Selsey	34	15	5	14	55	63	−8	50	
10	Langney Sports	34	12	13	9	54	46	+8	49	
11	Redhill	34	13	3	18	49	56	−7	42	
12	Lancing	34	10	9	15	41	51	−10	39	
13	Haywards Heath	34	11	4	19	48	64	−16	37	
14	Shoreham	34	10	7	17	49	76	−27	37	
15	Eastbourne Town	34	9	9	16	46	58	−12	36	
16	Arundel	34	7	11	16	33	66	−33	32	
17	Oakwood	34	6	11	17	39	65	−26	29	Relegated to Division Two
18	Portfield	34	5	5	24	33	78	−45	20	Relegated to Division Two

Source: nonleaguematters
Rules for classification: 1) points; 2) goal difference; 3) number of goals scored.

== Division Two ==
Sussex County Football League Division Two
- Season: 1988–89
- Champions: Seaford Town
- Promoted: Seaford Town; Ringmer
- Relegated: East Grinstead
- Matches: 182
- Goals: 557 (3.06 per match)

Division Two featured twelve clubs which competed in the division last season, along with two new clubs:

- Broadbridge Heath, promoted from Division Three
- Horsham YMCA, relegated from Division One

=== League table ===
Pos	Team	Pld	W	D	L	GF	GA	GD	Pts	Qualification or relegation
1	Seaford Town	26	15	7	4	50	30	+20	52	Promoted to Division One
2	Ringmer	26	16	3	7	45	14	+31	51	Promoted to Division One
3	Midhurst & Easebourne	26	14	6	6	49	34	+15	48	
4	Storrington	26	14	5	7	42	31	+11	47	
5	Chichester City	26	12	8	6	41	30	+11	44	
6	Bexhill Town	26	12	7	7	47	37	+10	43	
7	Newhaven	26	8	14	4	46	35	+11	38	
8	Horsham YMCA	26	7	7	12	56	49	+7	28	
9	Broadbridge Heath	26	7	6	13	37	47	−10	27	
10	Ferring	26	8	3	15	35	52	−17	27	
11	Bosham	26	7	6	13	32	60	−28	27	
12	Little Common Albion	26	7	5	14	31	51	−20	26	
13	Crowborough Athletic	26	7	3	16	25	52	−27	24	
14	East Grinstead	26	6	4	16	21	35	−14	22	Relegated to Division Three

Source: nonleaguematters
Rules for classification: 1) points; 2) goal difference; 3) number of goals scored.

== Division Three ==
Sussex County Football League Division Three
- Season: 1988–89
- Champions: Saltdean United
- Promoted: Saltdean United; Stamco; Franklands Village
- Matches: 240
- Goals: 754 (3.14 per match)

Division Three featured twelve clubs which competed in the division last season, along with four new clubs:

- Falcons
- Forest
- Stamco, joined from the Southern Counties Combination
- Wigmore Athletic, relegated from Division Two, who also changed name to Worthing United

=== League table ===
Pos	Team	Pld	W	D	L	GF	GA	GD	Pts	Qualification or relegation
1	Saltdean United	30	20	5	5	52	21	+31	65	Promoted to Division Two
2	Stamco	30	19	5	6	58	29	+29	62	Promoted to Division Two
3	Franklands Village	30	17	8	5	54	29	+25	59	Promoted to Division Two
4	Sidley United	30	17	2	11	60	44	+16	53	
5	Falcons	30	13	11	6	35	25	+10	50	
6	Forest	30	15	3	12	61	55	+6	48	
7	Worthing United	30	13	8	9	56	37	+19	47	
8	Hassocks	30	13	7	10	48	29	+19	46	
9	Hurstpierpoint	30	12	8	10	53	41	+12	44	
10	Mile Oak	30	11	8	11	56	47	+9	41	
11	Ifield	30	11	4	15	53	53	0	37	
12	Cooksbridge	30	9	6	15	45	59	−14	33	Resigned from the league
13	East Preston	30	9	5	16	41	57	−16	32	
14	Leftovers Sports Club	30	4	10	16	26	58	−32	22	
15	Midway	30	5	2	23	24	81	−57	17	Resigned from the league
16	Lingfield	30	4	4	22	32	89	−57	15 (Note: Lingfield were deducted one point.)	Relegated to the Mid-Sussex League

Source: nonleaguematters
Rules for classification: 1) points; 2) goal difference; 3) number of goals scored.
