= 1987–88 Sussex County Football League =

The 1987–88 Sussex County Football League season was the 63rd in the history of Sussex County Football League a football competition in England.

== Division One ==
Sussex County Football League Division One
- Season: 1987–88
- Champions: Pagham
- Relegated: Horsham YMCA
- Matches: 240
- Goals: 706 (2.94 per match)

Division One featured 14 clubs which competed in the division last season, along with two new clubs, promoted from Division Two:

- Pagham
- Selsey

=== League table ===
| Pos | Team | Pld | W | D | L | GF | GA | GD | Pts | Qualification or relegation |
|---|---|---|---|---|---|---|---|---|---|---|
| 1 | Pagham | 30 | 20 | 7 | 3 | 60 | 22 | +38 | 67 | |
| 2 | Three Bridges | 30 | 18 | 7 | 5 | 59 | 28 | +31 | 61 | |
| 3 | Wick | 30 | 18 | 4 | 8 | 52 | 40 | +12 | 58 | |
| 4 | Eastbourne Town | 30 | 17 | 4 | 9 | 63 | 41 | +22 | 55 | |
| 5 | Whitehawk | 30 | 15 | 3 | 12 | 47 | 31 | +16 | 48 | |
| 6 | Hailsham Town | 30 | 14 | 6 | 10 | 46 | 33 | +13 | 48 | |
| 7 | Haywards Heath | 30 | 11 | 6 | 13 | 53 | 51 | +2 | 39 | |
| 8 | Peacehaven & Telscombe | 30 | 10 | 8 | 12 | 49 | 55 | −6 | 38 | |
| 9 | Burgess Hill Town | 30 | 10 | 8 | 12 | 33 | 40 | −7 | 38 | |
| 10 | Shoreham | 30 | 9 | 10 | 11 | 51 | 54 | −3 | 37 | |
| 11 | Selsey | 30 | 9 | 9 | 12 | 38 | 49 | −11 | 36 | |
| 12 | Arundel | 30 | 9 | 6 | 15 | 39 | 53 | −14 | 33 | |
| 13 | Lancing | 30 | 7 | 10 | 13 | 32 | 45 | −13 | 31 | |
| 14 | Littlehampton Town | 30 | 8 | 6 | 16 | 31 | 46 | −15 | 30 | |
| 15 | Portfield | 30 | 7 | 7 | 16 | 25 | 51 | −26 | 28 | |
| 16 | Horsham YMCA | 30 | 5 | 5 | 20 | 28 | 67 | −39 | 20 | Relegated to Division Two |

Source: nonleaguematters
Rules for classification: 1) points; 2) goal difference; 3) number of goals scored.

== Division Two ==
Sussex County Football League Division Two
- Season: 1987–88
- Champions: Langney Sports
- Promoted: Langney Sports; Oakwood
- Relegated: Wigmore Athletic
- Matches: 210
- Goals: 661 (3.15 per match)

Division Two featured eleven clubs which competed in the division last season, along with four new clubs.

- Clubs relegated from Division One:
  - Chichester City
  - Midhurst & Easebourne
- Clubs promoted from Division Three:
  - Crowborough Athletic
  - Langney Sports

=== League table ===
| Pos | Team | Pld | W | D | L | GF | GA | GD | Pts | Qualification or relegation |
|---|---|---|---|---|---|---|---|---|---|---|
| 1 | Langney Sports | 28 | 20 | 6 | 2 | 65 | 19 | +46 | 66 | Promoted to Division One |
| 2 | Bexhill Town | 28 | 17 | 4 | 7 | 52 | 29 | +23 | 55 | |
| 3 | Oakwood | 28 | 15 | 7 | 6 | 56 | 33 | +23 | 52 | Promoted to Division One |
| 4 | Chichester City | 28 | 12 | 9 | 7 | 61 | 36 | +25 | 45 | |
| 5 | Ringmer | 28 | 12 | 7 | 9 | 50 | 38 | +12 | 43 | |
| 6 | Little Common Albion | 28 | 11 | 8 | 9 | 43 | 33 | +10 | 41 | |
| 7 | Storrington | 28 | 11 | 7 | 10 | 47 | 42 | +5 | 40 | |
| 8 | Midhurst & Easebourne | 28 | 12 | 4 | 12 | 39 | 47 | −8 | 40 | |
| 9 | Seaford Town | 28 | 11 | 5 | 12 | 43 | 50 | −7 | 38 | |
| 10 | Ferring | 28 | 8 | 9 | 11 | 29 | 36 | −7 | 33 | |
| 11 | East Grinstead | 28 | 9 | 4 | 15 | 41 | 48 | −7 | 31 | |
| 12 | Crowborough Athletic | 28 | 9 | 4 | 15 | 32 | 46 | −14 | 31 | |
| 13 | Newhaven | 28 | 9 | 4 | 15 | 39 | 62 | −23 | 31 | |
| 14 | Bosham | 28 | 5 | 6 | 17 | 36 | 68 | −32 | 21 | |
| 15 | Wigmore Athletic | 28 | 5 | 4 | 19 | 28 | 74 | −46 | 19 | Relegated to Division Three |

Source: nonleaguematters
Rules for classification: 1) points; 2) goal difference; 3) number of goals scored.

== Division Three ==
Sussex County Football League Division Three
- Season: 1987–88
- Champions: Midway
- Promoted: Broadbridge Heath
- Matches: 182
- Goals: 634 (3.48 per match)

Division Three featured ten clubs which competed in the division last season, along with four new clubs:

- Franklands Village, relegated from Division Two
- Hassocks, demoted from Division Two
- Mile Oak, joined from the Southern Counties Combination League
- Sidley United, relegated from Division Two

=== League table ===
| Pos | Team | Pld | W | D | L | GF | GA | GD | Pts | Qualification or relegation |
|---|---|---|---|---|---|---|---|---|---|---|
| 1 | Midway | 26 | 20 | 3 | 3 | 58 | 11 | +47 | 63 | |
| 2 | Ifield | 26 | 18 | 2 | 6 | 60 | 26 | +34 | 56 | |
| 3 | Broadbridge Heath | 26 | 17 | 4 | 5 | 56 | 24 | +32 | 55 | Promoted to Division Two |
| 4 | Mile Oak | 26 | 15 | 7 | 4 | 57 | 27 | +30 | 52 | |
| 5 | Hurstpierpoint | 26 | 11 | 5 | 10 | 58 | 45 | +13 | 38 | |
| 6 | Cooksbridge | 26 | 12 | 2 | 12 | 48 | 45 | +3 | 38 | |
| 7 | APV Athletic | 26 | 12 | 2 | 12 | 51 | 59 | −8 | 38 | Resigned from the league |
| 8 | Franklands Village | 26 | 10 | 6 | 10 | 46 | 42 | +4 | 36 | |
| 9 | Hassocks | 26 | 9 | 6 | 11 | 39 | 35 | +4 | 33 | |
| 10 | Leftovers Sports Club | 26 | 7 | 7 | 12 | 23 | 47 | −24 | 28 | |
| 11 | Saltdean United | 26 | 8 | 3 | 15 | 44 | 66 | −22 | 27 | |
| 12 | East Preston | 26 | 5 | 7 | 14 | 47 | 59 | −12 | 22 | |
| 13 | Sidley United | 26 | 4 | 6 | 16 | 33 | 69 | −36 | 18 | |
| 14 | Lingfield | 26 | 2 | 4 | 20 | 14 | 79 | −65 | 10 | |

Source: nonleaguematters
Rules for classification: 1) points; 2) goal difference; 3) number of goals scored.
