= 1984–85 Sussex County Football League =

The 1984–85 Sussex County Football League season was the 60th in the history of Sussex County Football League a football competition in England.

== Division One ==
Sussex County Football League Division One
- Season: 1984–85
- Champions: Steyning Town
- Promoted: Hastings Town
- Relegated: Wick
- Matches: 240
- Goals: 785 (3.27 per match)

Division One featured 14 clubs which competed in the division last season, along with two new clubs, promoted from Division Two:

- Arundel
- Portfield

=== League table ===
Pos	Team	Pld	W	D	L	GF	GA	GD	Pts	Qualification or relegation
1	Steyning Town	30	23	3	4	74	26	+48	72	
2	Littlehampton Town	30	21	3	6	65	26	+39	66	
3	Eastbourne Town	30	19	6	5	66	26	+40	63	
4	Whitehawk	30	18	7	5	69	34	+35	61	
5	Arundel	30	17	7	6	77	38	+39	58	
6	Three Bridges	30	14	6	10	65	38	+27	48	
7	Portfield	30	12	5	13	36	38	−2	41	
8	Burgess Hill Town	30	8	14	8	48	49	−1	38	
9	Hastings Town	30	8	8	14	45	64	−19	32	Placed in the Southern League Southern Division
10	Peacehaven & Telscombe	30	9	5	16	44	64	−20	32	
11	Horsham YMCA	30	7	8	15	37	57	−20	29	
12	Lancing	30	7	7	16	41	59	−18	28	
13	Ringmer	30	5	13	12	22	47	−25	28	
14	Hailsham Town	30	6	10	14	32	70	−38	28	
15	Midhurst & Easebourne	30	7	5	18	39	56	−17	26	
16	Wick	30	3	5	22	25	93	−68	14	Relegated to Division Two

Source: nonleaguematters
Rules for classification: 1) points; 2) goal difference; 3) number of goals scored.

== Division Two ==
Sussex County Football League Division Two
- Season: 1984–85
- Champions: Shoreham
- Promoted: Shoreham; Chichester City
- Relegated: Bexhill Town
- Matches: 240
- Goals: 751 (3.13 per match)

Division Two featured 13 clubs which competed in the division last season, along with three new clubs:

- Ferring, promoted from Division Three
- Franklands Village, promoted from Division Three
- Pagham, relegated from Division One

=== League table ===
Pos	Team	Pld	W	D	L	GF	GA	GD	Pts	Qualification or relegation
1	Shoreham	30	23	4	3	58	22	+36	73	Promoted to Division One
2	Chichester City	30	23	3	4	71	19	+52	72	Promoted to Division One
3	Pagham	30	19	4	7	61	32	+29	61	
4	Storrington	30	15	6	9	52	36	+16	51	
5	Hassocks	30	13	8	9	48	34	+14	47	
6	East Grinstead	30	14	3	13	56	44	+12	45	
7	Haywards Heath	30	12	8	10	64	41	+23	44	
8	Ferring	30	14	2	14	43	48	−5	44	
9	Sidley United	30	12	7	11	46	55	−9	43	
10	Franklands Village	30	10	10	10	55	48	+7	40	
11	Selsey	30	10	6	14	27	42	−15	36	
12	Lingfield	30	9	8	13	46	48	−2	35	
13	Albion United	30	9	4	17	39	66	−27	31	
14	Wigmore Athletic	30	7	4	19	40	68	−28	25	
15	Newhaven	30	4	4	22	18	64	−46	16	
16	Bexhill Town	30	1	9	20	27	84	−57	12	Relegated to Division Three

Source: nonleaguematters
Rules for classification: 1) points; 2) goal difference; 3) number of goals scored.

== Division Three ==
Sussex County Football League Division Three
- Season: 1984–85
- Champions: Oakwood
- Promoted: Oakwood; Bosham
- Matches: 210
- Goals: 719 (3.42 per match)

Division Three featured ten clubs which competed in the division last season, along with five new clubs:

- Cooksbridge
- Crowborough Athletic, relegated from Division Two
- Ifield
- Oakwood, joined from the Southern Counties Combination League
- Saltdean United

=== League table ===
Pos	Team	Pld	W	D	L	GF	GA	GD	Pts	Qualification or relegation
1	Oakwood	28	21	4	3	85	28	+57	67	Promoted to Division Two
2	Bosham	28	18	7	3	80	36	+44	61	Promoted to Division Two
3	Saltdean United	28	16	8	4	68	31	+37	56	
4	Midway	28	14	3	11	50	50	0	45	
5	Langney Sports	28	12	6	10	52	41	+11	42	
6	Seaford Town	28	13	3	12	44	43	+1	42	
7	Crowborough Athletic	28	10	8	10	43	42	+1	38	
8	Broadbridge Heath	28	11	5	12	38	41	−3	38	
9	Westdene	28	11	4	13	50	56	−6	37	
10	East Preston	28	11	3	14	31	43	−12	36	
11	Cooksbridge	28	10	4	14	56	51	+5	34	
12	Eastbourne Rangers	28	10	4	14	39	53	−14	30 (Note: Eastbourne Rangers were deducted four points.)	
13	Ifield	28	7	6	15	27	57	−30	27	
14	Hurstpierpoint	28	6	4	18	24	60	−36	22	
15	St Francis Hospital	28	4	3	21	32	87	−55	15	Resigned from the league

Source: nonleaguematters
Rules for classification: 1) points; 2) goal difference; 3) number of goals scored.
