= 1986–87 Sussex County Football League =

The 1986–87 Sussex County Football League season was the 62nd in the history of Sussex County Football League a football competition in England.

== Division One ==
Sussex County Football League Division One
- Season: 1986–87
- Champions: Arundel
- Relegated: Chichester City; Midhurst & Easebourne
- Matches: 240
- Goals: 762 (3.18 per match)

Division One featured 14 clubs which competed in the division last season, along with two new clubs, promoted from Division Two:

- Haywards Heath
- Wick

=== League table ===
| Pos | Team | Pld | W | D | L | GF | GA | GD | Pts | Qualification or relegation |
|---|---|---|---|---|---|---|---|---|---|---|
| 1 | Arundel | 30 | 20 | 5 | 5 | 83 | 39 | +44 | 65 | |
| 2 | Whitehawk | 30 | 19 | 6 | 5 | 56 | 24 | +32 | 63 | |
| 3 | Haywards Heath | 30 | 18 | 5 | 7 | 63 | 39 | +24 | 59 | |
| 4 | Three Bridges | 30 | 18 | 4 | 8 | 67 | 41 | +26 | 58 | |
| 5 | Eastbourne Town | 30 | 15 | 11 | 4 | 56 | 23 | +33 | 56 | |
| 6 | Littlehampton Town | 30 | 14 | 7 | 9 | 49 | 33 | +16 | 49 | |
| 7 | Peacehaven & Telscombe | 30 | 13 | 7 | 10 | 49 | 61 | −12 | 46 | |
| 8 | Shoreham | 30 | 12 | 8 | 10 | 41 | 42 | −1 | 44 | |
| 9 | Wick | 30 | 11 | 9 | 10 | 61 | 57 | +4 | 42 | |
| 10 | Lancing | 30 | 11 | 5 | 14 | 55 | 48 | +7 | 38 | |
| 11 | Burgess Hill Town | 30 | 8 | 6 | 16 | 32 | 40 | −8 | 30 | |
| 12 | Portfield | 30 | 7 | 7 | 16 | 32 | 46 | −14 | 28 | |
| 13 | Horsham YMCA | 30 | 7 | 5 | 18 | 38 | 54 | −16 | 26 | |
| 14 | Hailsham Town | 30 | 5 | 10 | 15 | 31 | 62 | −31 | 25 | |
| 15 | Chichester City | 30 | 4 | 7 | 19 | 23 | 75 | −52 | 19 | Relegated to Division Two |
| 16 | Midhurst & Easebourne | 30 | 4 | 6 | 20 | 26 | 78 | −52 | 18 | Relegated to Division Two |

Source: nonleaguematters
Rules for classification: 1) points; 2) goal difference; 3) number of goals scored.

== Division Two ==
Sussex County Football League Division Two
- Season: 1986–87
- Champions: Pagham
- Promoted: Pagham; Selsey
- Relegated: Franklands Village; Sidley United
- Matches: 240
- Goals: 694 (2.89 per match)

Division Two featured 13 clubs which competed in the division last season, along with three new clubs:

- Bexhill Town, promoted from Division Three
- Ringmer, relegated from Division One
- Seaford Town, promoted from Division Three

Also, Albion United changed name to Little Common Albion.

=== League table ===
| Pos | Team | Pld | W | D | L | GF | GA | GD | Pts | Qualification or relegation |
|---|---|---|---|---|---|---|---|---|---|---|
| 1 | Pagham | 30 | 22 | 6 | 2 | 63 | 11 | +52 | 72 | Promoted to Division One |
| 2 | Selsey | 30 | 21 | 2 | 7 | 68 | 28 | +40 | 65 | Promoted to Division One |
| 3 | Bexhill Town | 30 | 15 | 7 | 8 | 54 | 39 | +15 | 52 | |
| 4 | East Grinstead | 30 | 14 | 10 | 6 | 46 | 33 | +13 | 52 | |
| 5 | Oakwood | 30 | 14 | 5 | 11 | 40 | 37 | +3 | 47 | |
| 6 | Little Common Albion | 30 | 13 | 7 | 10 | 57 | 42 | +15 | 46 | |
| 7 | Ferring | 30 | 12 | 6 | 12 | 34 | 35 | −1 | 42 | |
| 8 | Bosham | 30 | 12 | 6 | 12 | 48 | 55 | −7 | 42 | |
| 9 | Seaford Town | 30 | 11 | 7 | 12 | 37 | 35 | +2 | 40 | |
| 10 | Newhaven | 30 | 10 | 6 | 14 | 36 | 48 | −12 | 36 | |
| 11 | Hassocks | 30 | 10 | 6 | 14 | 32 | 53 | −21 | 36 | Demoted to Division Three |
| 12 | Wigmore Athletic | 30 | 9 | 6 | 15 | 48 | 56 | −8 | 33 | |
| 13 | Storrington | 30 | 8 | 6 | 16 | 32 | 43 | −11 | 30 | |
| 14 | Ringmer | 30 | 6 | 11 | 13 | 35 | 48 | −13 | 29 | |
| 15 | Franklands Village | 30 | 7 | 6 | 17 | 31 | 59 | −28 | 27 | Relegated to Division Three |
| 16 | Sidley United | 30 | 4 | 7 | 19 | 33 | 72 | −39 | 19 | Relegated to Division Three |

Source: nonleaguematters
Rules for classification: 1) points; 2) goal difference; 3) number of goals scored.

== Division Three ==
Sussex County Football League Division Three
- Season: 1986–87
- Champions: Langney Sports
- Promoted: Langney Sports; Crowborough Athletic
- Matches: 182
- Goals: 667 (3.66 per match)

Division Three featured 13 clubs which competed in the division last season, along with one new club:

- Lingfield, relegated from Division Two

=== League table ===
| Pos | Team | Pld | W | D | L | GF | GA | GD | Pts | Qualification or relegation |
|---|---|---|---|---|---|---|---|---|---|---|
| 1 | Langney Sports | 26 | 21 | 3 | 2 | 101 | 19 | +82 | 66 | Promoted to Division Two |
| 2 | Crowborough Athletic | 26 | 18 | 4 | 4 | 60 | 25 | +35 | 58 | Promoted to Division Two |
| 3 | Midway | 26 | 14 | 6 | 6 | 52 | 23 | +29 | 48 | |
| 4 | Cooksbridge | 26 | 14 | 5 | 7 | 56 | 34 | +22 | 47 | |
| 5 | Ifield | 26 | 13 | 4 | 9 | 49 | 44 | +5 | 43 | |
| 6 | East Preston | 26 | 12 | 4 | 10 | 47 | 52 | −5 | 40 | |
| 7 | Westdene | 26 | 12 | 3 | 11 | 60 | 56 | +4 | 39 | Resigned from the league |
| 8 | Broadbridge Heath | 26 | 10 | 7 | 9 | 38 | 34 | +4 | 37 | |
| 9 | Saltdean United | 26 | 10 | 3 | 13 | 36 | 47 | −11 | 33 | |
| 10 | APV Athletic | 26 | 9 | 4 | 13 | 51 | 54 | −3 | 31 | |
| 11 | Eastbourne Rangers | 26 | 9 | 2 | 15 | 41 | 65 | −24 | 29 | Resigned from the league |
| 12 | Hurstpierpoint | 26 | 6 | 5 | 15 | 31 | 63 | −32 | 23 | |
| 13 | Leftovers Sports Club | 26 | 6 | 2 | 18 | 31 | 71 | −40 | 20 | |
| 14 | Lingfield | 26 | 1 | 2 | 23 | 14 | 80 | −66 | 5 | |

Source: nonleaguematters
Rules for classification: 1) points; 2) goal difference; 3) number of goals scored.
