= 1985–86 Sussex County Football League =

The 1985–86 Sussex County Football League season was the 61st in the history of Sussex County Football League a football competition in England.

== Division One ==
Sussex County Football League Division One
- Season: 1985–86
- Champions: Steyning Town
- Relegated: Ringmer
- Matches: 240
- Goals: 726 (3.03 per match)

Division One featured 14 clubs which competed in the division last season, along with two new clubs, promoted from Division Two:

- Chichester City
- Shoreham

=== League table ===
Pos	Team	Pld	W	D	L	GF	GA	GD	Pts	Qualification or relegation
1	Steyning Town	30	22	6	2	61	16	+45	72	Transferred to the Wessex League
2	Three Bridges	30	19	6	5	58	24	+34	63	
3	Eastbourne Town	30	18	7	5	71	23	+48	61	
4	Whitehawk	30	13	11	6	46	30	+16	50	
5	Peacehaven & Telscombe	30	15	4	11	55	44	+11	49	
6	Littlehampton Town	30	13	7	10	44	29	+15	46	
7	Burgess Hill Town	30	13	6	11	47	41	+6	45	
8	Portfield	30	13	6	11	40	48	−8	45	
9	Arundel	30	12	8	10	55	37	+18	44	
10	Lancing	30	11	7	12	42	52	−10	40	
11	Hailsham Town	30	9	7	14	45	49	−4	34	
12	Shoreham	30	10	4	16	42	57	−15	34	
13	Chichester City	30	7	6	17	35	64	−29	27	
14	Midhurst & Easebourne	30	5	7	18	33	65	−32	22	
15	Horsham YMCA	30	5	4	21	33	90	−57	19	
16	Ringmer	30	4	6	20	19	57	−38	18	Relegated to Division Two

Source: nonleaguematters
Rules for classification: 1) points; 2) goal difference; 3) number of goals scored.

== Division Two ==
Sussex County Football League Division Two
- Season: 1985–86
- Champions: Wick
- Promoted: Wick; Haywards Heath
- Relegated: Lingfield
- Matches: 240
- Goals: 783 (3.26 per match)

Division Two featured 13 clubs which competed in the division last season, along with three new clubs:

- Bosham, promoted from Division Three
- Oakwood, promoted from Division Three
- Wick, relegated from Division One

=== League table ===
Pos	Team	Pld	W	D	L	GF	GA	GD	Pts	Qualification or relegation
1	Wick	30	22	6	2	94	35	+59	72	Promoted to Division One
2	Haywards Heath	30	22	5	3	72	26	+46	71	Promoted to Division One
3	Pagham	30	22	5	3	70	18	+52	69 (Note: Pagham were deducted two points.)	
4	Sidley United	30	15	8	7	52	36	+16	53	
5	East Grinstead	30	15	5	10	44	30	+14	50	
6	Albion United	30	13	6	11	49	48	+1	45	
7	Bosham	30	12	7	11	56	53	+3	43	
8	Ferring	30	12	6	12	47	51	−4	42	
9	Storrington	30	10	10	10	48	41	+7	40	
10	Oakwood	30	10	7	13	31	50	−19	37	
11	Hassocks	30	8	9	13	38	38	0	33	
12	Newhaven	30	8	5	17	32	57	−25	29	
13	Selsey	30	7	5	18	35	67	−32	26	
14	Wigmore Athletic	30	7	2	21	44	71	−27	23	
15	Franklands Village	30	6	4	20	36	74	−38	22	
16	Lingfield	30	5	2	23	35	88	−53	17	Relegated to Division Three

Source: nonleaguematters
Rules for classification: 1) points; 2) goal difference; 3) number of goals scored.

== Division Three ==
Sussex County Football League Division Three
- Season: 1985–86
- Champions: Seaford Town
- Promoted: Seaford Town; Bexhill Town
- Matches: 210
- Goals: 760 (3.62 per match)

Division Three featured twelve clubs which competed in the division last season, along with three new clubs:

- APV Athletic
- Bexhill Town, relegated from Division Two
- Leftovers Sports Club

=== League table ===
Pos	Team	Pld	W	D	L	GF	GA	GD	Pts	Qualification or relegation
1	Seaford Town	28	18	5	5	64	31	+33	59	Promoted to Division Two
2	Bexhill Town	28	17	7	4	72	31	+41	58	Promoted to Division Two
3	East Preston	28	15	5	8	54	32	+22	50	
4	Langney Sports	28	14	4	10	53	39	+14	46	
5	Saltdean United	28	13	6	9	58	41	+17	45	
6	Ifield	28	13	3	12	56	66	−10	42	
7	APV Athletic	28	12	5	11	50	72	−22	41	
8	Eastbourne Rangers	28	11	6	11	55	63	−8	39	
9	Crowborough Athletic	28	10	6	12	49	56	−7	36	
10	Westdene	28	9	7	12	44	49	−5	34	
11	Hurstpierpoint	28	8	8	12	43	56	−13	32	
12	Midway	28	6	9	13	44	51	−7	27	
13	Cooksbridge	28	6	8	14	50	57	−7	26	
14	Broadbridge Heath	28	5	10	13	35	50	−15	25	
15	Leftovers Sports Club	28	6	5	17	33	66	−33	23	

Source: nonleaguematters
Rules for classification: 1) points; 2) goal difference; 3) number of goals scored.
