= 2013–14 Sussex County Football League =

The 2013–14 Sussex County Football League season was the 89th in the history of Sussex County Football League, a football competition in England playing at Levels 9-11 in the English football league pyramid.

== Division One ==
Sussex County Football League Division One
- Season: 2013–14
- Champions: East Preston
- Relegated: Worthing United
- Matches: 380
- Goals: 1,309 (3.44 per match)

Division One featured 18 clubs which competed in the division last season, along with two new clubs, promoted from Division Two:

- Littlehampton Town
- Newhaven

East Preston have won the league but cannot be promoted after failing to meet the ground grading for Step 4.

=== League table ===
Pos	Team	Pld	W	D	L	GF	GA	GD	Pts	Promotion or relegation
1	East Preston	38	30	6	2	92	23	+69	96	
2	East Grinstead Town	38	24	7	7	84	39	+45	79	Promoted to the Isthmian League Division One South
3	Littlehampton Town	38	24	5	9	85	41	+44	77	
4	Horsham YMCA	38	22	10	6	110	45	+65	76	
5	Crowborough Athletic	38	21	7	10	69	41	+28	70	Transferred to the Southern Counties East League
6	Hassocks	38	17	9	12	72	65	+7	60	
7	Pagham	38	16	10	12	66	57	+9	58	
8	Dorking Wanderers	38	16	7	15	68	63	+5	55	
9	Ringmer	38	16	5	17	61	64	−3	53	
10	St Francis Rangers	38	15	6	17	66	68	−2	51	
11	Chichester City	38	14	9	15	53	65	−12	51	
12	Arundel	38	15	5	18	58	68	−10	50	
13	Newhaven	38	13	10	15	67	63	+4	49	
14	Shoreham	38	12	8	18	65	82	−17	44	
15	Lingfield	38	12	6	20	70	88	−18	42	Transferred to the Southern Counties East League
16	Hailsham Town	38	13	3	22	63	91	−28	42	
17	Selsey	38	12	5	21	45	76	−31	41	
18	Lancing	38	12	8	18	55	80	−25	38 (Note: Lancing were deducted six points.)	Reprieved from relegation
19	Rye United	38	6	8	24	38	45	−7	26	Withdrew from league at end of season
20	Worthing United	38	2	2	34	22	145	−123	8	Relegated to Division Two

Source: League Official
Rules for classification: 1) points; 2) goal difference; 3) number of goals scored.

=== Results ===
Home \ Away	ARU	CHI	CRW	DOW	EGT	EPR	HAI	HAS	HYM	LAN	LIN	LIT	NEW	PAG	RIN	RYE	SEL	SHO	STF	WOR
Arundel		3–1	0–3	0–2	0–0	0–5	4–1	3–1	0–2	1–2	1–5	0–4	1–0	1–0	1–2	2–2	0–1	3–2	3–1	3–1
Chichester City	2–0		1–1	2–2	1–3	3–0	3–1	1–1	2–2	1–1	4–1	1–1	2–2	1–0	1–0	H/W (Note: Rye United withdrew - (21 Mar 2014) : Remaining opponents given 3 points.)	3–1	2–1	1–2	1–0
Crowborough Athletic	3–0	1–0		2–1	2–3	0–3	2–1	4–0	1–0	1–1	4–0	0–1	1–0	4–2	3–0	2–1	1–2	1–1	3–4	3–0
Dorking Wanderers	2–2	3–1	1–2		2–0	0–3	3–1	1–2	2–0	0–0	1–1	5–2	1–1	0–3	1–4	H/W	3–0	3–1	2–0	4–1
East Grinstead Town	2–0	3–0	3–0	3–0		0–3	3–0	1–1	0–0	4–2	1–0	1–6	4–1	4–1	4–2	H/W	1–1	4–1	3–0	8–0
East Preston	3–1	4–0	1–1	3–0	0–2		1–0	5–0	1–1	6–0	3–1	3–2	2–0	2–1	2–0	H/W	4–0	1–0	2–1	2–0
Hailsham Town	0–3	4–0	2–2	5–3	0–3	3–3		2–1	1–2	1–2	1–3	1–2	4–3	0–2	3–2	2–4	1–3	3–2	3–2	5–0
Hassocks	2–1	2–2	1–0	1–0	2–2	0–4	6–1		1–1	2–1	3–1	2–1	1–1	6–1	2–5	2–1	5–0	5–1	0–2	3–0
Horsham YMCA	3–2	2–1	2–1	4–2	1–4	1–1	9–0	5–0		5–0	4–3	3–3	5–1	5–1	2–1	0–0	2–1	6–3	0–0	6–0
Lancing	1–4	1–0	1–6	1–2	2–0	1–5	0–2	1–3	0–6		1–1	1–6	2–2	1–2	4–0	4–1	2–0	1–2	2–3	4–1
Lingfield	1–3	2–1	3–2	1–1	0–2	1–4	4–5	0–1	3–1	2–3		0–0	0–6	4–3	0–2	H/W	3–1	4–5	2–5	3–1
Littlehampton Town	2–0	7–0	0–0	2–1	3–0	0–0	3–1	1–0	3–2	2–0	1–4		3–1	0–2	4–2	H/W	0–1	0–3	2–1	10–1
Newhaven	0–0	3–4	0–2	2–5	3–1	1–1	3–2	3–0	0–3	1–1	4–1	0–1		2–1	0–0	3–2	5–1	2–2	1–2	8–0
Pagham	2–2	3–0	1–1	2–1	3–2	1–2	2–2	3–3	2–2	1–0	2–0	0–2	1–1		2–2	1–0	3–0	4–0	4–2	3–1
Ringmer	1–3	4–1	2–0	1–3	0–3	0–2	2–0	2–1	2–0	2–3	2–1	1–4	1–2	0–0		1–2	2–1	3–2	1–0	4–0
Rye United	A/W	0–2	A/W	1–1	1–3	A/W	A/W	1–4	1–3	0–0	3–3	2–0	A/W	2–2	A/W		3–1	A/W	5–4	A/W
Selsey	0–2	2–1	1–3	2–1	0–0	1–4	0–2	2–1	1–1	0–3	3–2	1–2	1–3	2–0	1–1	H/W		1–2	6–0	1–1
Shoreham	5–3	1–3	0–2	5–1	0–2	0–3	2–1	3–3	1–4	3–3	1–1	0–2	0–1	0–1	1–1	1–1	4–2		2–1	3–3
St Francis Rangers	4–0	1–1	1–2	1–3	1–1	0–1	2–1	1–1	0–4	2–1	2–4	1–0	2–0	0–0	3–2	2–2	5–0	1–3		5–0
Worthing United	0–6	0–3	1–3	1–5	0–4	1–3	0–1	1–3	0–11	0–2	1–5	0–3	3–1	0–4	2–4	2–3	0–4	0–2	0–2	

Source: League Official
Legend: Blue = home team win; Yellow = draw; Red = away team win.

== Division Two ==
Sussex County Football League Division Two
- Season: 2013–14
- Champions: Eastbourne United
- Promoted: Eastbourne United; Broadbridge Heath; Loxwood
- Matches: 272
- Goals: 1,046 (3.85 per match)

Division Two featured 15 clubs which competed in the division last season, along with two new clubs:

- AFC Uckfield, demoted from Division One
- Haywards Heath Town, promoted from Division Three

Also, Wick merged with Division Three club Barnham to create Wick & Barnham United.

=== League table ===
Pos	Team	Pld	W	D	L	GF	GA	GD	Pts	Promotion
1	Eastbourne United	32	23	5	4	99	34	+65	74	Promoted to Division One
2	Broadbridge Heath	32	21	9	2	85	21	+64	72	Promoted to Division One
3	Loxwood	32	22	4	6	98	52	+46	70	Promoted to Division One
4	Little Common	32	19	4	9	86	61	+25	61	
5	Haywards Heath Town	32	15	11	6	73	55	+18	56	
6	Wick & Barnham United	32	15	7	10	64	47	+17	52	
7	Mile Oak	32	14	10	8	55	44	+11	51 (Note: Mile Oak were deducted one point.)	
8	Bexhill United	32	12	9	11	57	43	+14	45	
9	Westfield	32	12	5	15	55	50	+5	38 (Note: Westfield were deducted three points.)	
10	AFC Uckfield	32	10	8	14	55	62	−7	38	
11	Steyning Town	32	10	8	14	53	68	−15	38	
12	Oakwood	32	11	5	16	57	82	−25	38	
13	Saltdean United	32	10	3	19	53	101	−48	33	
14	Midhurst & Easebourne	32	9	1	22	35	81	−46	28	
15	Storrington	32	7	5	20	50	74	−24	26	
16	Rustington	32	7	3	22	40	76	−36	24	
17	Seaford Town	32	4	5	23	31	95	−64	17	

Source: League Official
Rules for classification: 1) points; 2) goal difference; 3) number of goals scored.

=== Results ===
Home \ Away	AFU	BEX	BRH	EUA	HWH	LIC	LOX	M&E	MIO	OAK	RUS	SAL	SEA	STE	STO	WES	W&B
AFC Uckfield		0–2	4–0	1–2	1–1	1–4	2–3	3–3	0–2	4–2	1–1	6–0	2–0	2–0	0–0	2–5	2–2
Bexhill United	2–2		1–2	3–2	0–0	5–1	1–5	5–0	0–0	1–1	3–0	4–0	3–0	2–2	4–2	0–1	0–1
Broadbridge Heath	2–0	2–2		2–2	2–2	0–2	3–0	4–0	3–0	3–0	2–0	4–1	3–0	4–1	6–0	1–0	2–0
Eastbourne United	3–2	1–0	0–1		4–0	3–0	1–1	4–0	0–3	2–0	6–1	7–0	4–0	9–0	2–1	6–1	3–2
Haywards Heath Town	1–1	1–0	1–1	3–4		2–2	3–4	4–2	2–0	2–3	3–2	6–1	3–3	1–1	5–3	1–1	3–1
Little Common	7–2	1–0	2–2	2–2	4–2		4–2	2–0	4–2	1–3	2–1	5–0	6–1	4–6	6–2	1–0	3–4
Loxwood	3–1	5–4	0–1	2–5	3–1	6–3		3–2	5–2	4–1	5–2	2–0	10–0	1–1	2–0	2–0	1–0
Midhurst & Easebourne	1–2	0–2	1–5	0–4	1–4	0–1	2–1		3–1	0–3	1–0	4–0	1–4	0–2	1–5	2–1	0–1
Mile Oak	1–1	4–3	0–0	2–2	2–4	0–0	2–2	2–0		2–1	0–2	5–0	2–1	4–0	1–0	1–1	3–3
Oakwood	1–4	1–1	0–5	0–3	2–2	5–4	2–4	3–0	0–5		2–1	4–3	2–4	2–1	3–2	0–3	2–4
Rustington	1–0	0–1	0–6	2–2	0–1	2–1	3–5	1–2	1–3	0–3		3–0	6–0	2–1	4–4	0–1	1–3
Saltdean United	3–0	2–2	0–5	0–4	3–3	3–1	0–5	6–1	1–2	5–2	1–0		5–2	1–4	4–4	5–3	1–3
Seaford Town	4–1	0–2	0–6	0–2	1–2	1–2	0–4	1–2	0–0	2–2	2–1	1–2		2–3	0–2	1–5	0–2
Steyning Town	2–3	1–3	1–1	1–4	2–3	0–2	3–2	0–3	1–1	2–2	5–0	4–1	1–1		1–0	1–2	2–1
Storrington	2–3	3–0	0–6	0–2	0–3	0–1	1–1	2–0	0–1	2–3	2–3	3–1	2–0	3–1		1–2	1–1
Westfield	1–2	0–0	0–0	0–1	1–3	1–4	0–1	4–1	1–2	3–1	2–0	1–2	7–0	1–2	4–3		3–3
Wick & Barnham United	1–0	3–1	1–1	4–3	0–1	3–4	2–4	1–2	3–0	3–1	6–0	1–2	0–0	1–1	3–0	1–0	

Source: League Official
Legend: Blue = home team win; Yellow = draw; Red = away team win.

== Division Three ==
Sussex County Football League Division Three
- Season: 2013–14
- Champions: Langney Wanderers
- Matches: 110
- Goals: 400 (3.64 per match)

Division Three featured nine clubs which competed in the division last season, along with two new clubs:

- Langney Wanderers, promoted from the East Sussex League
- Southwick, demoted from Division Two

=== League table ===
Pos	Team	Pld	W	D	L	GF	GA	GD	Pts	Qualification
1	Langney Wanderers	20	16	2	2	64	20	+44	50	
2	Ferring	20	12	5	3	44	20	+24	41	
3	Roffey	20	10	3	7	37	30	+7	33	
4	Uckfield Town	20	10	3	7	35	30	+5	33	Merged into AFC Uckfield
5	Sidlesham	20	9	3	8	35	31	+4	30	
6	Ifield	20	9	2	9	45	47	−2	29	
7	Hurstpierpoint	20	9	1	10	29	42	−13	28	
8	Clymping	20	6	4	10	23	33	−10	22	
9	Southwick	20	6	2	12	31	42	−11	20	
10	Rottingdean Village	20	4	3	13	28	49	−21	15	
11	Billingshurst	20	4	2	14	29	56	−27	14	

Source: League Official
Rules for classification: 1) points; 2) goal difference; 3) number of goals scored.
