= 1983–84 Sussex County Football League =

The 1983–84 Sussex County Football League season was the 59th in the history of Sussex County Football League a football competition in England. It also was the first season for the league to consist of three divisions.

== Division One ==
Sussex County Football League Division One
- Season: 1983–84
- Champions: Whitehawk
- Relegated: Pagham
- Matches: 240
- Goals: 771 (3.21 per match)

Division One featured 14 clubs which competed in the division last season, along with two new clubs, promoted from Division Two:

- Horsham YMCA
- Lancing

=== League table ===
Pos	Team	Pld	W	D	L	GF	GA	GD	Pts	Qualification or relegation
1	Whitehawk	30	23	5	2	77	19	+58	74	
2	Littlehampton Town	30	22	5	3	92	32	+60	71	
3	Steyning Town	30	20	6	4	62	27	+35	66	
4	Southwick	30	18	9	3	67	22	+45	63	Transferred to the Combined Counties League
5	Three Bridges	30	16	4	10	59	45	+14	52	
6	Hastings Town	30	13	7	10	52	34	+18	46	
7	Peacehaven & Telscombe	30	12	7	11	50	37	+13	43	
8	Ringmer	30	10	5	15	38	52	−14	35	
9	Hailsham Town	30	10	3	17	35	65	−30	33	
10	Eastbourne Town	30	8	8	14	33	43	−10	32	
11	Horsham YMCA	30	10	2	18	43	65	−22	32	
12	Midhurst & Easebourne	30	8	8	14	36	77	−41	32	
13	Lancing	30	8	6	16	41	62	−21	30	
14	Wick	30	6	8	16	31	57	−26	26	
15	Burgess Hill Town	30	4	9	17	29	56	−27	21	
16	Pagham	30	4	4	22	26	78	−52	16	Relegated to Division Two

Source: nonleaguematters
Rules for classification: 1) points; 2) goal difference; 3) number of goals scored.

== Division Two ==
Sussex County Football League Division Two
- Season: 1983–84
- Champions: Portfield
- Promoted: Portfield; Arundel
- Relegated: Crowborough Athletic
- Matches: 240
- Goals: 779 (3.25 per match)

Division Two featured 13 clubs which competed in the division last season, along with three new clubs:

- Arundel, relegated from Division One
- Chichester City, relegated from Division One
- Lingfield, transferred from the Combined Counties League

=== League table ===
Pos	Team	Pld	W	D	L	GF	GA	GD	Pts	Qualification or relegation
1	Portfield	30	23	6	1	71	21	+50	75	Promoted to Division One
2	Arundel	30	20	6	4	72	27	+45	66	Promoted to Division One
3	Hassocks	30	18	5	7	66	38	+28	59	
4	Wigmore Athletic	30	17	8	5	57	33	+24	59	
5	Bexhill Town	30	17	7	6	65	31	+34	58	
6	Chichester City	30	15	4	11	54	39	+15	49	
7	Haywards Heath	30	12	12	6	53	33	+20	48	
8	East Grinstead	30	10	9	11	39	41	−2	39	
9	Lingfield	30	10	8	12	47	42	+5	38	
10	Sidley United	30	9	6	15	52	58	−6	33	
11	Albion United	30	9	6	15	47	68	−21	33	
12	Selsey	30	6	10	14	41	56	−15	28	
13	Storrington	30	6	10	14	39	54	−15	28	
14	Newhaven	30	7	5	18	31	58	−27	26	
15	Shoreham	30	2	8	20	23	83	−60	14	
16	Crowborough Athletic	30	1	6	23	22	97	−75	9	Relegated to Division Three

Source: nonleaguematters
Rules for classification: 1) points; 2) goal difference; 3) number of goals scored.

== Division Three ==
Sussex County Football League Division Three
- Season: 1983–84
- Champions: East Preston
- Promoted: Franklands Village; Ferring
- Matches: 156
- Goals: 483 (3.1 per match)

=== League table ===
Pos	Team	Pld	W	D	L	GF	GA	GD	Pts	Qualification or relegation
1	East Preston	24	15	6	3	38	15	+23	51	
2	Franklands Village	24	13	11	0	48	19	+29	50	Promoted to Division Two
3	Ferring	24	13	8	3	53	15	+38	47	Promoted to Division Two
4	Bosham	24	11	5	8	50	38	+12	38	
5	Langney Sports	24	10	8	6	43	36	+7	38	
6	Westdene	24	10	4	10	42	32	+10	34	
7	Broadbridge Heath	24	9	7	8	36	31	+5	34	
8	Seaford Town	24	9	5	10	32	40	−8	32	
9	Midway	24	10	1	13	40	35	+5	31	
10	Hurstpierpoint	24	6	7	11	27	46	−19	25	
11	Eastbourne Rangers	24	7	2	15	31	52	−21	23	
12	Lower Bevendean	24	3	5	16	24	61	−37	14	Resigned from the league
13	St Francis Hospital	24	3	5	16	19	63	−44	14	

Source: nonleaguematters
Rules for classification: 1) points; 2) goal difference; 3) number of goals scored.
