= 2020–21 Southern Combination Football League =

Southern Combination League
- Season: 2020–21
- Champions: None
- Promoted: Lancing
- Relegated: None

The 2020–21 Southern Combination Football League season was the 96th in the history of the competition, which lies at levels 9 and 10 of the English football league system. This season also marked 100 years since the league was first formed, with Eastbourne Town, Newhaven and Shoreham being the only teams still in the league to have played in the first season.

The club allocations for Steps 5 and 6 were announced by The Football Association (The FA) for the 2020–21 season on 21 July 2020 and remained unchanged after the 2019–20 season was abandoned on 26 March due to the coronavirus pandemic.

On 18 July 2020 the FA released a statement that football would provisionally start on 5 September subject to spectators being able to watch games. With the FA Cup qualifying rounds starting from 1 September as midweek games to bring it in line with a November start for the First Round proper. The League Cup and the Sussex RUR Cup were cancelled this season with the main focus being the league season completed. Only the Sussex Senior Challenge Cup was to be played during the season.

== Covid–19 impact ==
The season was briefly paused between Thursday 5 November and 2 December 2020 as the UK Government imposed a four-week lockdown on non-elite sports across England. With the lockdown ending the Counties of Sussex and Surrey were placed in Tier 2 and clubs held a vote with the league whether to recommence the season. The league restarted with Division Two recommencing on Saturday 5 December and the Premier and Division One recommencing on Tuesday 8 December.

On Saturday 20 December, the UK Government announced that parts of the Sussex and Surrey would be placed in a new Tier 4. With Alfold, Bexhill United and Horley Town being in that tier, players and fans living in the Tier 4 area were not allowed to travel; the SCFL decided to again pause the season on 22 December with a review whether to re-start the season on 9 January 2021 which later resulted in a suspension until further notice.

On 24 February 2021, the FA Alliance and Leagues committees announced that the 2020–21 would be curtailed, subject to ratification by The FA, with immediate effect.

On 18 March, the Southern Combination League committee announced a supplementary cup competition to provide competitive football for their teams. Premier and Division One teams started on 10 April with Division Two teams kicked off earlier, on 3 April. The winners of each group then entered a semi-final and the final was played on or after 17 May.

== Promotion, relegation and restructuring ==
The scheduled restructuring of non-League football took place at the end of the season. Promotions from Steps 5 to 4 and 6 to 5 were based on points per game across all matches over the two abandoned seasons (2019–20 and 2020–21), while teams were promoted to Step 6 on the basis of a subjective application process.

== Premier Division ==
Southern Combination League Premier Division
- Season: 2020–21
- Dates: 5 September 2020 – 28 May 2021
- Matches: 126
- Goals: 445 (3.53 per match)
- Biggest away win: East Preston 0–8 Saltdean United (29 September 2020)
- Longest winning run: 7 matches Horley Town
- Longest unbeaten run: 10 matches Saltdean United
- Longest losing run: 9 matches Horsham YMCA; East Preston
- Highest attendance: 300; Various matches due to COVID-19 restrictions
- Total attendance: 12,543
- All statistics correct as of 19 December 2020.

The Premier Division consisted of 20 clubs, the same as last season.

=== Premier Division table at time of curtailment ===
Pos	Team	Pld	W	D	L	GF	GA	GD	Pts	Promotion or qualification
1	Saltdean United	14	9	4	1	35	15	+20	31	
2	Horley Town	12	8	2	2	33	12	+21	26	Transferred to the Combined Counties League
3	Pagham	13	7	5	1	31	14	+17	26	
4	Eastbourne Town	14	8	2	4	30	20	+10	26	
5	AFC Uckfield Town	14	7	3	4	17	14	+3	24	
6	Crawley Down Gatwick	11	7	1	3	23	15	+8	22	
7	Newhaven	10	6	2	2	24	8	+16	20	
8	Lancing (P)	11	6	2	3	30	20	+10	20	Promoted to the Isthmian League South East Division (Note: Lancing promoted based on points per game calculations from 2019–20 & 2020–21 seasons combined.)
9	Lingfield	12	5	5	2	21	16	+5	20	
10	Loxwood	14	6	1	7	26	23	+3	19	
11	Steyning Town Community	13	6	0	7	18	19	−1	18	
12	Hassocks	13	6	0	7	25	33	−8	18	
13	Alfold	11	5	2	4	22	16	+6	17	
14	Little Common	12	4	3	5	20	23	−3	15	
15	Broadbridge Heath	13	5	0	8	24	28	−4	15	
16	Peacehaven & Telscombe	13	4	2	7	19	20	−1	14	
17	Eastbourne United Association	14	4	1	9	12	39	−27	13	
18	Langney Wanderers	12	2	1	9	11	31	−20	7	Resigned from the league (Note: Langney Wanderers withdrew from the league after the season was curtailed.)
19	Horsham YMCA	13	1	2	10	13	31	−18	5	
20	East Preston	13	0	2	11	11	48	−37	2	

Source: FA Full-Time SCFL Premier table
Rules for classification: 1) Points; 2) Goal difference; 3) Number of goals scored; 4) Number of matches won; 5) Head-to-head results
(P) Promoted

=== Results table ===
Home \ Away	ALF	UCK	BBH	CDG	EBT	EBU	EPR	HSK	HOR	HYM	LAN	LAW	LIN	LCM	LOX	NEW	PAG	PAT	SDU	STT
Alfold			5–4					3–1			0–1			2–0						
AFC Uckfield Town			1–0		1–0					2–1		2–1				0–3				3–0
Broadbridge Heath						6–1	4–1	1–0	0–4		3–4	2–0	1–5							
Crawley Down Gatwick	1–5	3–0				4–0				3–2	1–1				1–0				1–3	2–1
Eastbourne Town	1–0							6–2	1–2	3–2	3–1			2–3				2–1		
Eastbourne United Association		0–2	3–0				1–0	1–0				1–4	1–1	2–4				2–1		
East Preston	2–2			0–3				3–4						2–2	1–4				0–8	0–2
Hassocks			0–1						0–8		3–2	7–2					2–1	2–1		1–3
Horley Town							4–0								2–3	0–0	2–3			2–1
Horsham YMCA	0–2				1–0			1–3	1–4				1–1						3–3	
Lancing							4–1		1–2				6–1		1–4		2–2		2–1	
Langney Wanderers					1–2												1–6			
Lingfield	2–1					1–3	5–0		1–1			0–0		0–0	2–1					
Little Common		1–1								2–0	2–3				3–1				1–5	
Loxwood		0–3	2–1		2–4	6–0												2–1	0–2	
Newhaven	2–0				1–1	5–0	5–1		1–2					3–2					1–2	
Pagham	2–2	2–0		2–1						2–0		4–0			0–0			1–1		4–1
Peacehaven & Telscombe		1–1		1–3						4–0	1–4	2–0	1–2	2–0						2–1
Saltdean United		1–1	2–1		2–2	1–0									2–1		2–2			
Steyning Town Community		1–0				5–0			2–1			1–0				0–3			0–1	

Source: FA Full-Time SCFL Fixtures and Results
Legend: Blue = home team win; Yellow = draw; Red = away team win.

=== Results by matchday ===
Matchday	1	2	3	4	5	6	7	8	9	10	11	12	13	14	15
Alfold	W	D	D	L	W	L	W	L	W	L	W				
AFC Uckfield Town	W	D	D	W	W	W	W	W	L	L	L	D	W	L	
Broadbridge Heath	L	L	L	L	W	W	L	L	L	W	W	L	W		
Crawley Down Gatwick	W	W	D	L	W	W	L	L	W	W					
Eastbourne Town	L	W	D	L	W	W	L	W	W	W	W	L	D	W	
Eastbourne United Association	W	L	W	W	L	L	L	L	D	L	L	L	W	L	
East Preston	D	L	L	D	L	L	L	L	L	L	L	L	L		
Hassocks	L	W	L	L	W	W	L	W	L	W	W	L	L		
Horley Town	D	W	W	W	W	W	W	W	L	D	L	W			
Horsham YMCA	W	L	L	L	L	L	L	L	L	L	D	D	L		
Lancing	W	L	W	D	W	L	W	L	D	W	W				
Langney Wanderers	L	D	L	W	L	L	L	L	L	W	L	L			
Lingfield	L	D	W	D	W	L	W	D	W	L	D	D			
Little Common	D	D	D	W	L	L	W	L	W	L	W	L			
Loxwood	L	W	L	D	L	W	L	L	W	W	W	L	W	L	
Newhaven	D	W	D	W	W	L	W	W	W	L					
Pagham	W	D	D	D	W	L	W	W	D	D	W	W	W		
Peacehaven & Telscombe	L	L	W	L	L	W	L	W	L	W	D	D	W		
Saltdean United	W	W	D	L	D	W	W	W	W	W	W	D	D	W	
Steyning Town Community	L	L	W	L	L	W	L	W	W	W	L	L	W		

Source: FA Full-Time SCFL
W = Win; D = Draw; L = Loss

=== Position by matchday ===
Team ╲ Round	1	2	3	4	5	6	7	8	9	10	11	12	13	14	15
Alfold	5	6	8	12	10	12	11	12	10	13	12				
AFC Uckfield Town	3	5	4	2	1	1	1	1	1	3	5	4	2	5	
Broadbridge Heath	17	20	20	20	18	17	17	17	17	17	15	17	15		
Crawley Down Gatwick	6	1	5	10	7	5	9	11	10	8	6				
Eastbourne Town	14	10	12	12	9	6	9	7	5	4	3	3	5	4	
Eastbourne United Association	4	12	3	1	6	9	11	12	12	14	16	17	16	17	
East Preston	9	15	17	18	19	19	20	20	20	20	20	20	20		
Hassocks	15	11	16	17	15	10	11	10	11	8	7	10	11		
Horley Town	11	10	3	3	3	3	2	1	2	2	3	2			
Horsham YMCA	8	9	14	17	18	18	19	19	19	19	19	19	19		
Lancing	1	7	4	4	4	5	4	8	9	9	7				
Langney Wanderers	19	16	19	14	16	17	18	18	18	18	18	18			
Lingfield	20	17	8	9	8	11	8	9	7	5	6	9			
Little Common	10	13	14	11	13	14	10	13	10	14	12	14			
Loxwood	13	8	10	11	13	12	13	14	13	12	11	11	10	10	
Newhaven	12	4	7	7	4	7	4	4	4	7					
Pagham	2	3	6	6	5	8	6	6	7	8	6	4	3		
Peacehaven & Telscombe	16	18	11	13	15	14	15	14	15	16	15	16	15		
Saltdean United	7	2	1	3	3	2	2	2	2	1	1	1	1	1	
Steyning Town Community	18	20	15	16	17	16	16	16	14	12	13	13	11		

Promotion to Step 4
Possible promotion to Step 4
Possible relegation to Step 6

Source: FA Full-Time SCFL

=== Top scorers ===
Correct as of 24 February 2021

Rank	Player	Club	Goals
1	Louis Croal	Broadbridge Heath (previously Crawley Down Gatwick)	12
1	Jared Rance	Pagham	12
3	Charlie Pitcher	Hassocks	10
3	Lee Robinson	Newhaven	10
5	Ben Connolly	Lancing	9
5	Adam Grant	Horley Town	9
5	Daniel Perry	Eastbourne Town (previously AFC Uckfield Town)	9
8	James Allen	Lingfield	8
9	George Cousins	Steyning Town	7
9	Kelvin Lucas	Alfold	7
9	Trevor McCreadie	Saltdean United (previously Eastbourne Town)	7
9	Sam Lemon	Alfold	7

=== Stadia and locations ===
Map showing the location of teams in the Premier Division

Team	Location	Stadium	Capacity	Founded
Alfold	Alfold Crossways	Alfold Recreation Ground	1,000	1923
AFC Uckfield Town	Framfield	The Oaks	1,000	2014
Broadbridge Heath	Broadbridge Heath	High Wood Hill Sports Ground	1,000	1919
Crawley Down Gatwick	Crawley Down	The Haven Centre	1,000	1993
Eastbourne Town	Eastbourne	The Saffrons	3,000	1881
Eastbourne United Association	Eastbourne	The Oval	2,000	2003
East Preston	Littlehampton (East Preston)	The Lashmar	2,000	1966
Hassocks	Hassocks	The Beacon	1,500	1902
Horley Town	Horley	The New Defence	1,800	1896
Horsham YMCA	Horsham	Gorings Mead	1,575	1898
Lancing	Lancing	Culver Road	1,500	1941
Langney Wanderers	Eastbourne (Langney)	Priory Lane (groundshare with Eastbourne Borough) (Note: Langney Wanderers unable to play at Shinewater Lane as the ground does not meet league requirements.)	4,151	2010
Lingfield	Lingfield	The Sports Pavilion	2,000	1893
Little Common	Eastbourne	The Oval (groundshare with Eastbourne United) (Note: Little Common unable to play at The Recreation Ground (Bexhill) as the ground does not meet league requirements.)	2,000	1966
Loxwood	Loxwood	Plaistow Road	1,000	1920
Newhaven	Newhaven	The Trafalgar Ground	3,000	1889
Pagham	Pagham	Nyetimber Lane	1,500	1903
Peacehaven & Telscombe	Peacehaven	The Sports Park	3,000	1923
Saltdean United	Brighton (Saltdean)	Hill Park	1,000	1966
Steyning Town Community	Steyning	The Shooting Field	2,000	1892

== Division One ==
Southern Combination League Division One
- Season: 2020–21
- Dates: 5 September 2020 – 15 May 2021
- Matches: 85
- Goals: 320 (3.76 per match)
- Longest winning run: 6 matches AFC Varndeanians; Bexhill United
- Longest unbeaten run: 11 matches Bexhill United
- Longest losing run: 7 matches Oakwood
- Total attendance: 5,461
- All statistics correct as of 19 December 2020.

Division One was reduced from 18 clubs to 16 after Sidlesham resigned during the previous season and Southwick were demoted into the Mid Sussex Football League.

=== Division One table at time of curtailment ===
Pos	Team	Pld	W	D	L	GF	GA	GD	Pts	Promotion
1	Bexhill United (P)	11	10	1	0	34	9	+25	31	Promoted to the Premier Division
2	Littlehampton Town (P)	10	9	1	0	48	9	+39	28	Promoted to the Premier Division
3	AFC Varndeanians (P)	10	7	2	1	23	12	+11	23	Promoted to the Premier Division
4	Midhurst & Easebourne	12	7	1	4	24	20	+4	22	
5	Shoreham	12	6	2	4	26	18	+8	20	
6	Worthing United	9	6	0	3	10	10	0	18	
7	Mile Oak	11	5	0	6	25	27	−2	15	
8	Wick	10	4	2	4	21	19	+2	14	
9	Billingshurst	11	3	4	4	17	27	−10	13	
10	Roffey	12	3	2	7	19	23	−4	11	
11	Storrington	12	3	1	8	13	24	−11	10	
12	Arundel	10	2	3	5	19	29	−10	9	
13	Seaford Town	10	2	2	6	11	17	−6	8	
14	Selsey	9	2	2	5	7	14	−7	8	
15	Hailsham Town	10	2	1	7	12	34	−22	7	
16	Oakwood	11	1	2	8	11	28	−17	5	

Source: FA Full-Time Division 1 Table
Rules for classification: 1) Points; 2) Goal difference; 3) Number of goals scored; 4) Number of matches won; 5) Head-to-head results
(P) Promoted

=== Results table ===
Home \ Away	VAR	ARU	BEX	BIL	HAI	LIT	MDE	MOK	OAK	ROF	SEA	SEL	SHO	STO	WIC	WRU
AFC Varndeanians								4–0	2–0							2–1
Arundel	2–2					1–5				5–1			2–2	1–2		1–2
Bexhill United	5–3	6–0		3–0									2–0			1–0
Billingshurst	1–4								2–2	1–0				2–1	3–1	
Hailsham Town	0–2			3–3		1–6				0–5		1–2	0–3			
Littlehampton Town				7–1			6–1		5–1		2–2					6–0
Midhurst & Easebourne		1–1	2–3		4–0			1–4	2–0						2–1	
Mile Oak			0–1		7–2	1–5	1–2			4–3		3–1				
Oakwood		2–3	1–6									1–0	0–2			
Roffey	1–2		2–2				2–4								1–1	0–1
Seaford Town			1–2		1–2		1–6		2–1	2–0		1–1				
Selsey				0–0		0–4				0–2						0–2
Shoreham				4–4		1–2			3–2	1–2	3–1			6–1		1–0
Storrington				2–0	1–3		0–3	1–2	1–1		3–1	0–3				
Wick	2–2	6–3	0–3					5–2					2–0	2–1		
Worthing United							2–0	2–1			1–0					

Source: FA Full-Time SCFL Fixtures and Results
Legend: Blue = home team win; Yellow = draw; Red = away team win.

=== Results by matchday ===
Matchday	1	2	3	4	5	6	7	8	9	10	11	12	13
AFC Varndeanians	D	W	W	W	W	W	W	D	L				
Arundel	D	D	L	L	W	D	L	L	L	W			
Bexhill United	W	W	W	W	W	W	D	W	W	W	W		
Billingshurst	D	W	L	D	W	W	D	L	D	L	L		
Hailsham Town	L	L	L	W	L	L	D	L	W	L			
Littlehampton Town	W	W	W	W	W	D	W	W	W	W			
Midhurst & Easebourne	L	L	W	W	D	W	L	W	L	W	W	W	
Mile Oak	W	W	W	L	W	W	L	L	L	L	L		
Oakwood	D	L	L	L	L	L	L	L	D	W	L		
Roffey	L	W	W	L	D	L	L	D	L	L	W	L	
Seaford Town	D	L	L	L	L	D	W	W	L	L			
Selsey	D	L	L	D	W	W	L	L	L				
Shoreham	D	L	W	W	W	D	L	L	L	W	W	W	
Storrington	D	L	L	L	L	L	W	L	L	W	W		
Wick	L	L	W	D	L	W	W	D	W	L			
Worthing United	W	W	L	L	L	W	W	W	W				

Source: FA Full-Time SCFL Division 1
W = Win; D = Draw; L = Loss

=== Top scorers ===
Correct until 24 February 2021

Rank	Player	Club	Goals
1	Joseph Benn	Littlehampton Town	17
2	Evan Archibald	Bexhill United	13
3	Daniel Simmonds	Wick	10
4	Marcus Bedford	Midhurst & Easebourne	8
4	Thomas Biggs	Mile Oak	8
4	Jack McLean	Bexhill United	8
7	Daniel Hegarty	Littlehampton Town	6
7	Jordan Layton	Littlehampton Town	6
7	Ramon Santos	Shoreham	6
10	Lewis Hyde	Midhurst & Easebourne	5
10	Joseph Keehan	AFC Varndeanians	5
10	Harry Lowe	Roffey	5

=== Stadia and locations ===
Map showing the location of teams in Division 1

Team	Location	Stadium	Capacity	Founded
AFC Varndeanians	Brighton (Withdean)	Withdean Stadium (groundshare with Brighton Electricity)	8,850	1929
Arundel	Arundel	Mill Road	2,200	1889
Bexhill United	Bexhill-on-Sea	The Polegrove	—	2002
Billingshurst	Billingshurst	Jubilee Fields	—	1891
Hailsham Town	Hailsham	The Beaconsfield	2,000	1885
Littlehampton Town	Littlehampton	St Flora Sportsfield (groundshare with Littlehampton United)	4,000	1896
Midhurst & Easebourne	Easebourne	Rotherfield	—	1946
Mile Oak	Brighton (Mile Oak)	Mile Oak Recreation Ground	—	1960
Oakwood	Crawley (Three Bridges)	Tinsley Lane	—	1962
Roffey	Horsham (Roffey)	Bartholomew Way	—	1901
Seaford Town	Seaford	The Crouch	—	1888
Selsey	Selsey	Bunn Leisure Stadium	—	1903
Shoreham	Shoreham-by-Sea	Middle Road	2,000	1892
Storrington	Storrington	The Recreation Ground, Storrington	—	1883
Wick	Littlehampton (Wick)	Crabtree Park	2,000	1892
Worthing United	Worthing (Broadwater)	The Robert Albon Memorial Ground	1,504	1988

== Division Two ==
Southern Combination League Division Two
- Season: 2020–21
- Matches: 71
- Goals: 275 (3.87 per match)
- Highest scoring: St Francis Rangers 4–6 Littlehampton United (12 September 2020)
- Total attendance: 2,667
- All statistics correct as of 19 December 2020.

Division Two was reduced from 15 teams to 14 after Cowfold resigned from the league last season and Angmering Village transferred to the West Sussex Football League and featured one new club:

- Charlwood, transferred from the Mid Sussex Football League

Promotion from this division depended on ground grading as well as league position.

=== League table ===
Pos	Team	Pld	W	D	L	GF	GA	GD	Pts	Promotion
1	Rustington	10	8	1	1	34	8	+26	25	
2	Upper Beeding	11	7	4	0	25	8	+17	25	
3	Copthorne	10	7	0	3	24	12	+12	21	
4	TD Shipley	8	6	2	0	26	5	+21	20	
5	St Francis Rangers	11	5	2	4	25	21	+4	17	
6	Montpelier Villa	9	4	2	3	20	12	+8	14	Promoted to Division One (Note: Montpelier Villa promoted based on points per game calculations from 2019–20 & 2020–21 seasons combined.)
7	Jarvis Brook	9	4	1	4	17	15	+2	13	
8	Worthing Town	10	3	4	3	15	16	−1	13	
9	Charlwood	10	4	1	5	17	21	−4	13	
10	Littlehampton United	11	3	1	7	21	29	−8	10	
11	Bosham	10	2	2	6	15	25	−10	8	
12	Brighton Electricity	11	2	2	7	12	30	−18	8	
13	Ferring	12	2	1	9	15	31	−16	7	
14	Rottingdean Village	10	2	1	7	7	40	−33	7	

Source: FA Full-Time SCFL Division 2 Table
Rules for classification: 1) points; 2) goal difference; 3) number of goals scored.

=== Results table ===
Home \ Away	BOS	BRE	CHA	COP	FER	JAR	LIT	MON	ROT	RUS	STF	TDS	UBD	WOR
Bosham			1–3				2–0				1–5	1–1	2–2	
Brighton Electricity				0–2	1–0	3–3					1–1	0–2		
Charlwood		4–2					2–1	1–3			3–5			1–2
Copthorne	3–2				3–2	1–2	3–1							
Ferring	3–1		0–1					0–2	4–1	1–3		0–4	0–8	
Jarvis Brook	4–0				4–3				2–0	2–3		0–2	0–1	
Littlehampton United		4–1								2–1			0–1	
Montpelier Villa		9–1	2–1	0–1							1–4		0–1	2–2
Rottingdean Village	3–2			0–8			1–0				4–0		1–6	
Rustington		4–0		4–1		2–0	5–0		7–0				2–2	
St Francis Rangers				0–2	2–0		4–6			0–3			2–3	1–0
TD Shipley			4–0				5–3	1–1	7–0					
Upper Beeding		1–0	1–3											
Worthing Town	1–3	0–3		1–0	2–2		4–4		3–0				0–0	

Source: SCFL Fixtures and Results
Legend: Blue = home team win; Yellow = draw; Red = away team win.

=== Results by matchday ===
Matchday	1	2	3	4	5	6	7	8	9	10	11	12	13
Bosham	L	D	L	W	W	L	D	L	L	L			
Brighton Electricity	L	L	L	L	L	D	L	L	D	W	W		
Charlwood	L	W	W	L	W	W	L	L	L	W			
Copthorne	W	L	W	L	W	W	W	W	W	L			
Ferring	L	W	D	L	L	L	L	L	W	L	L	L	
Jarvis Brook	W	L	W	W	L	D	W	L	L				
Littlehampton United	L	W	L	L	L	W	W	L	D	L	L		
Montpelier Villa	W	D	L	W	L	D	L	W	W				
Rottingdean Village	L	L	L	L	W	L	L	L	W				
Rustington	W	W	D	W	W	L	W	W	W	W	W		
St Francis Rangers	L	L	W	L	L	W	W	W	D	W	L		
TD Shipley	W	D	W	W	W	W	D	W					
Upper Beeding	W	D	D	W	W	W	D	W	W	L	W		
Worthing Town	W	W	D	W	L	D	D	L	D	L			

Source: SCFL
W = Win; D = Draw; L = Loss

=== Top scorers ===
Rank	Player	Club	Goals
1	Oscar Weddell	Copthorne	13
2	James Butt	Rustington	5
2	Bradley Curtis	TD Shipley	5
2	Jonathan Hendrick	Littlehampton United	5
2	Josh Irish	Rustington	5
2	Pat O'Sullivan	Upper Beeding	5
2	James Rowland	Upper Beeding	5
2	Ryan Warr	Upper Beeding	5
9	Mark Cave	TD Shipley	4
9	Chris Darwin	Rustington	4

=== Stadia and locations ===
Map showing the location of teams in Division 2

Team	Location	Stadium	Capacity	Founded
Bosham	Bosham	Walton Lane	—	1901
Brighton Electricity	Brighton (Withdean)	Withdean Stadium (groundshare with AFC Varndeanians)	8,850	—
Charlwood	Charlwood	Glovers Road	—	1901
Copthorne	Copthorne	King Georges Field	—	2004
Ferring	Ferring	The Glebelands	—	1952
Jarvis Brook	Crowborough	Limekiln	—	1888
Littlehampton United	Littlehampton	St Flora Sportsfield (groundshare with Littlehampton Town	4,000	1947
Montpelier Villa	Brighton (Falmer)	Sussex University	—	1991
Rottingdean Village	Brighton (Rottingdean)	Rottingdean Sports Centre	—	—
Rustington	Rustington	Rustington Recreation Ground	—	1903
St Francis Rangers	Haywards Heath	Colwell Ground	1000	2002
TD Shipley	Shipley (Dragon's Green)	Dragons Green	—	1994
Upper Beeding	Upper Beeding	Memorial Playing Field	—	—
Worthing Town	Worthing	Palatine Park	—	1995

== Supplementry Shield ==
=== Premier Division ===
==== Group A ====
Pos	Team	Pld	W	D	L	GF	GA	GD	Pts	Qualification	NEW	EBT	LCM	UFD
1	Newhaven	6	5	0	1	17	6	+11	15	Advance to semi-final	—	2–1	3–1	3–0
2	Eastbourne Town	6	5	0	1	15	7	+8	15		3–1	—	2–0	2–1
3	Little Common	6	1	1	4	6	14	−8	4		0–4	2–4	—	3–1
4	AFC Uckfield Town	6	0	1	5	4	15	−11	1		1–4	1–3	0–0	—

Source: SCFL

==== Group B ====
Pos	Team	Pld	W	D	L	GF	GA	GD	Pts	Qualification	LAN	PAG	STT	EPR
1	Lancing	6	4	1	1	16	4	+12	13	Advance to semi-final	—	1–2	8–1	3–0
2	Pagham	6	4	1	1	11	5	+6	13		0–0	—	0–1	4–2
3	Steyning Town	6	2	0	4	9	16	−7	6		0–2	1–4	—	3–1
4	East Preston	6	1	0	5	5	16	−11	3		1–2	1–0	0–4	—

Source: SCFL

==== Group C ====
Pos	Team	Pld	W	D	L	GF	GA	GD	Pts	Qualification	LIN	HSK	HOR	CDG
1	Lingfield	6	4	1	1	11	8	+3	13	Advance to semi-final	—	2–2	1–2	2–1
2	Hassocks	6	2	2	2	15	18	−3	8		2–3	—	2–8	2–2
3	Horley Town	6	2	1	3	12	10	+2	7		0–1	1–3	—	1–1
4	Crawley Down Gatwick	6	1	2	3	9	11	−2	5		1–2	2–4	2–0	—

Source: SCFL

==== Group D ====
Pos	Team	Pld	W	D	L	GF	GA	GD	Pts	Qualification	LOX	BBH	ALF	HYM
1	Loxwood	6	4	0	2	14	7	+7	12	Advance to semi-final	—	2–1	2–3	5–0
2	Broadbridge Heath	6	3	0	3	16	11	+5	9		1–2	—	2–5	3–0
3	Alfold	6	3	0	3	16	14	+2	9		0–2	1–4	—	5–1
4	Horsham YMCA	6	2	0	4	7	21	−14	6		2–1	1–5	3–2	—

Source: SCFL

==== semi-final ====
12 May 2021	Lancing	1–0	Lingfield	Culver Road

8 May 2021	Loxwood	2–2 (8–7 p)	Newhaven	Woodside Road, Worthing

==== Final ====
22 May 2021	Loxwood	1–1 (4–5 p)	Lancing	Steyning

=== Division One ===
==== Group A ====
Pos	Team	Pld	W	D	L	GF	GA	GD	Pts	Qualification	SEF	BEX	VAR	MOK
1	Seaford Town	6	3	1	2	9	5	+4	10	Advance to semi-final	—	1–2	1–1	3–0
2	Bexhill United	6	2	2	2	8	10	−2	8		0–2	—	1–1	H/W
3	AFC Varndeanians	6	1	4	1	10	10	0	7		1–2	4–4	—	1–1
4	Mile Oak	6	2	1	3	5	7	−2	7		1–0	2–1	1–2	—

Source: SCFL

==== Group B ====
Pos	Team	Pld	W	D	L	GF	GA	GD	Pts	Qualification	WOR	WIC	SHO	STO
1	Worthing United	6	6	0	0	16	4	+12	18	Advance to semi-final	—	2–1	2–1	2–0
2	Wick	6	3	0	3	11	10	+1	9		0–2	—	3–1	4–2
3	Shoreham	6	2	1	3	8	11	−3	7		0–4	1–0	—	2–2
4	Storrington	6	0	1	5	8	18	−10	1		2–4	2–3	0–3	—

Source: SCFL

==== Group C ====
Pos	Team	Pld	W	D	L	GF	GA	GD	Pts	Qualification	MDE	BIL	ARU	ROF	OAK
1	Midhurst & Easebourne	4	4	0	0	15	5	+10	12	Advance to semi-final	—	3–1	—	4–1	—
2	Billingshurst	4	3	0	1	9	4	+5	9	Advance to semi-final	—	—	3–1	—	4–0
3	Arundel	4	1	1	2	10	10	0	4		1–3	—	—	6–2	—
4	Roffey	4	1	0	3	7	12	−5	3		—	0–1	—	—	4–1
5	Oakwood	4	0	1	3	5	15	−10	1		2–5	—	2–0	—	—

Source: SCFL

==== semi-final ====
8 May 2021	Seaford Town	0–4	Billingshurst	The Crouch, Seaford

8 May 2021	Worthing United	2–3	Midhurst & Easebourne	Robert Albon Memorial Ground, Worthing

==== Final ====
19 May 2021	Billingshurst	1–1 (3–5 p)	Midhurst & Easebourne	Broadbridge Heath

=== Division Two ===
==== Group A ====
Pos	Team	Pld	W	D	L	GF	GA	GD	Pts	Qualification	MON	RUS	WRT	FER	ROT	LIT
1	Monpelier Villa	4	3	0	1	9	4	+5	9	Advance to semi-final	—	—	—	2–1	1–0	—
2	Rustington	4	2	1	1	7	5	+2	7	Advance to semi-final	3–1	—	0–1	—	2–1	—
3	Worthing Town	4	2	1	1	6	6	0	7		0–5	—	—	—	—	—
4	Ferring	4	1	1	2	8	9	−1	4		—	2–2	0–4	—	5–1	—
5	Rottingdean	4	0	1	3	3	9	−6	1		—	—	1–1	—	—	—
6	Littlehampton United	0	0	0	0	0	0	0	0		—	—	—	—	—	—

Source: SCFL

==== Group B ====
Pos	Team	Pld	W	D	L	GF	GA	GD	Pts	Qualification	UBD	TDS	STF	JAR	CHA	COP
1	Upper Beeding	5	3	1	1	11	8	+3	10	Advance to semi-final	—	4–2	—	—	2–0	2–2
2	TD Shipley	5	3	0	2	12	8	+4	9	Advance to semi-final	—	—	0–2	1–2	—	—
3	St Francis Rangers	5	3	0	2	9	6	+3	9		2–3	—	—	0–1	3–2	—
4	Jarvis Brook	5	3	0	2	7	9	−2	9		0–2	—	—	—	—	3–2
5	Charlwood	5	1	1	3	6	10	−4	4		—	0–4	—	4–1	—	0–0
6	Copthorne	5	0	2	3	6	10	−4	2		—	2–3	0–2	—	—	—

Source: SCFL

==== semi-final ====
8 May 2021	Montpelier Villa	0–0 (7–6 p)	TD Shipley

8 May 2021	Upper Beeding	2–4	Rustington

==== Final ====
18 May 2021	Montpelier Villa	5–1	Rustington	Steyning
