= 2014–15 Sussex County Football League =

The 2014–15 Sussex County Football League season was the 90th in the history of Sussex County Football League, a football competition in England playing at levels 9 - 11 in the English league pyramid.

This is the last season under the current name as the league changed its name to the Southern Combination Football League starting in the 2015-16 season.

== Division One ==
Sussex County Football League Division One
- Season: 2014–15
- Champions: Littlehampton Town
- Promoted: Dorking Wanderers
- Relegated: Ringmer; Crawley Down Gatwick; Selsey
- Matches: 380
- Goals: 1,429 (3.76 per match)

Division One featured 15 clubs which competed in the division last season, along with five new clubs.

- Clubs relegated from the Isthmian League:
  - Crawley Down Gatwick
  - Eastbourne Town
- Clubs promoted from Division Two:
  - Broadbridge Heath
  - Eastbourne United Association
  - Loxwood

Littlehampton Town won the league but could not be promoted after not applying for the Isthmian League, due to the ground not passing the grading test for Step 4.

=== League table ===
Pos	Team	Pld	W	D	L	GF	GA	GD	Pts	Promotion or relegation
1	Littlehampton Town	38	25	9	4	122	51	+71	84	
2	Dorking Wanderers	38	26	5	7	101	51	+50	83	Promoted to the Isthmian League Division One South
3	Pagham	38	24	7	7	77	41	+36	79	
4	Eastbourne Town	38	21	9	8	96	44	+52	72	
5	Horsham YMCA	38	21	5	12	100	57	+43	68	
6	Loxwood	38	18	14	6	82	52	+30	68	
7	Newhaven	38	18	10	10	84	56	+28	64	
8	Lancing	38	15	10	13	68	69	−1	55	
9	Broadbridge Heath	38	15	7	16	63	60	+3	52	
10	Arundel	38	15	10	13	59	59	0	52 (Note: Deducted 3 points for fielding an ineligible player.)	
11	East Preston	38	14	10	14	59	68	−9	52	
12	Eastbourne United	38	13	12	13	67	53	+14	51	
13	St Francis Rangers	38	13	8	17	67	70	−3	47	
14	Chichester City	38	11	12	15	42	61	−19	45	
15	Hassocks	38	11	11	16	68	78	−10	44	
16	Shoreham	38	12	7	19	58	68	−10	43	
17	Hailsham Town	38	11	4	23	82	108	−26	37	
18	Ringmer	38	9	7	22	58	120	−62	34	Relegated to new Division One
19	Crawley Down Gatwick	38	3	4	31	34	110	−76	13	Relegated to new Division One
20	Selsey	38	2	5	31	42	153	−111	11	Relegated to new Division One

Rules for classification: 1) points; 2) goal difference; 3) number of goals scored.

=== Results ===
Home \ Away	ARU	BRH	CHI	CDG	DOW	EPR	EST	EUA	HAI	HAS	HYM	LAN	LIT	LOX	NEW	PAG	RIN	SEL	SHO	STF
Arundel		2–1	0–0	0–0	2–1	0–0	1–2	1–1	2–1	1–1	1–6	0–2	2–1	1–1	1–0	1–2	5–1	5–1	3–0	3–0
Broadbridge Heath	0–1		1–1	3–0	0–1	1–0	0–3	0–2	4–1	1–2	2–0	0–2	0–3	0–2	1–2	0–2	1–1	5–0	1–4	1–3
Chichester City	1–0	2–1		2–1	0–1	0–0	1–1	1–1	1–4	0–0	0–0	3–4	0–1	0–2	0–2	0–2	2–1	3–1	1–1	3–2
Crawley Down Gatwick	2–2	0–5	0–1		0–3	2–4	0–3	3–2	2–5	1–2	0–4	1–4	1–6	1–2	1–2	0–3	0–1	4–0	0–0	0–4
Dorking Wanderers	3–1	1–1	2–1	5–2		1–0	3–0	1–1	6–0	3–0	2–1	5–0	2–2	1–0	3–3	2–4	6–2	6–0	2–1	5–2
East Preston	0–2	1–0	3–3	3–2	1–6		1–4	1–4	3–2	2–2	3–2	2–0	1–7	2–2	3–2	0–1	2–5	0–0	1–1	2–0
Eastbourne Town	3–2	1–2	2–2	6–1	3–3	4–0		1–0	3–0	2–2	2–3	3–1	1–3	2–2	1–1	4–0	1–1	5–0	4–0	0–1
Eastbourne United	0–0	0–2	1–2	7–1	1–0	1–3	0–0		3–1	1–2	1–0	3–1	3–0	0–3	1–1	1–0	2–4	6–0	2–0	1–3
Hailsham Town	7–2	3–5	3–4	4–2	2–5	1–3	0–1	1–3		1–1	1–2	1–3	2–2	4–4	2–3	1–4	3–1	4–0	4–2	2–3
Hassocks	1–0	1–2	1–2	2–1	2–3	0–4	1–3	3–3	3–1		2–5	1–1	1–6	1–1	2–3	1–2	3–1	6–1	2–0	1–1
Horsham YMCA	2–3	1–2	4–2	1–0	4–2	0–1	1–0	0–0	11–0	3–3		2–2	2–1	0–7	1–0	1–0	3–1	7–0	6–3	1–2
Lancing	4–0	3–0	1–1	0–0	3–7	5–1	2–3	2–1	2–6	3–0	1–1		2–5	3–1	1–3	2–2	1–4	3–3	1–0	0–0
Littlehampton Town	5–1	3–3	4–0	2–0	6–2	0–0	1–4	3–1	3–2	6–1	3–2	5–1		5–1	3–3	1–0	5–1	2–0	4–0	2–1
Loxwood	1–1	0–1	2–0	4–1	0–1	1–1	2–1	2–2	3–1	1–1	1–0	2–1	2–2		3–3	2–2	3–1	4–1	3–4	3–2
Newhaven	1–0	2–2	3–0	1–0	3–0	0–2	1–1	3–1	1–3	3–2	2–3	1–0	1–1	2–2		2–2	4–3	8–2	0–1	3–1
Pagham	1–1	0–2	4–0	2–1	0–1	– (Note: Home win was awarded)	1–2	1–0	3–1	4–2	3–2	0–0	3–3	2–2	1–0		8–0	3–1	2–1	4–2
Ringmer	3–1	3–5	0–1	4–2	1–2	2–1	1–8	1–5	2–2	4–3	0–7	0–0	0–6	0–2	0–8	0–3		1–7	1–1	2–2
Selsey	1–4	3–3	1–1	2–0	0–2	1–4	1–7	3–3	3–4	0–6	1–5	1–3	1–4	1–5	1–7	2–4	1–3		1–3	1–2
Shoreham	2–4	2–2	2–0	5–1	2–1	1–3	2–0	2–2	0–1	0–3	1–3	1–2	1–3	0–2	4–0	0–1	4–1	3–0		3–0
St Francis Rangers	1–3	2–3	2–1	5–0	0–1	2–2	1–5	1–1	3–1	2–1	2–4	0–2	3–3	1–2	1–0	0–2	1–1	8–0	1–1	

Legend: Blue = home team win; Yellow = draw; Red = away team win.

== Division Two ==
Sussex County Football League Division Two
- Season: 2014–15
- Champions: Worthing United
- Promoted: Worthing United; AFC Uckfield Town; Wick & Barnham United
- Matches: 210
- Goals: 761 (3.62 per match)

Division Two featured 14 clubs which competed in the division last season, along with one new club:

- Worthing United, relegated from Division One

Also A.F.C. Uckfield merged with Division Three club Uckfield Town to form A.F.C. Uckfield Town.

=== League table ===
Pos	Team	Pld	W	D	L	GF	GA	GD	Pts	Promotion or relegation
1	Worthing United	28	24	0	4	86	28	+58	72	Promoted to the Premier Division
2	AFC Uckfield Town	28	17	7	4	58	26	+32	58	Promoted to the Premier Division
3	Wick & Barnham United	28	17	7	4	62	35	+27	58	Promoted to the Premier Division
4	Oakwood	28	16	4	8	78	46	+32	52	
5	Mile Oak	28	15	6	7	53	28	+25	51	
6	Bexhill United	28	14	7	7	47	34	+13	49	
7	Little Common	28	14	3	11	54	50	+4	45	
8	Midhurst & Easebourne	28	11	5	12	53	68	−15	38	
9	Haywards Heath Town	28	11	3	14	38	53	−15	36	
10	Steyning Town	28	10	3	15	44	48	−4	33	
11	Rustington	28	9	3	16	47	62	−15	30	Demoted to new Division Two
12	Westfield	28	7	8	13	48	61	−13	29	Demoted to new Division Two
13	Saltdean United	28	8	4	16	36	60	−24	28	
14	Storrington	28	4	5	19	41	80	−39	17	
15	Seaford Town	28	0	1	27	16	82	−66	1	Reprieved from relegation

Source: scfl.org.uk
Rules for classification: 1) points; 2) goal difference; 3) number of goals scored.

=== Results ===
Home \ Away	AFU	BEX	HWH	LIC	M&E	MIO	OAK	RUS	SAL	SEA	STE	STO	WES	W&B	WOR
AFC Uckfield		0–0	3–1	3–1	1–2	0–0	1–2	3–1	3–1	2–0	2–1	5–1	4–1	1–1	2–1
Bexhill United	1–1		1–1	1–0	4–2	2–0	1–1	2–0	2–3	4–0	2–1	3–2	1–1	0–1	1–0
Haywards Heath Town	0–3	0–0		4–3	1–4	0–4	4–1	0–4	3–0	2–0	0–3	3–1	3–0	0–3	0–2
Little Common	0–2	2–1	2–1		4–2	2–1	2–1	2–5	3–1	3–0	3–2	5–0	1–1	4–0	1–5
Midhurst & Easebourne	2–4	3–1	1–0	4–4		0–4	3–3	2–1	3–1	2–1	1–3	1–0	3–2	3–3	1–7
Mile Oak	1–1	1–2	0–0	2–0	2–1		2–4	2–0	3–1	6–0	2–0	0–2	1–1	1–3	1–3
Oakwood	2–3	1–4	4–1	1–1	2–0	1–3		4–1	1–2	8–1	4–0	7–1	4–3	5–1	1–3
Rustington	0–3	2–3	1–3	2–1	1–1	2–3	0–4		7–0	4–2	1–2	2–2	2–1	1–3	0–7
Saltdean United	1–4	2–1	0–1	1–2	2–2	0–3	0–2	0–2		2–1	1–1	4–2	2–2	0–1	1–2
Seaford Town	0–1	0–2	0–2	0–1	2–4	0–4	0–6	1–2	0–2		0–2	1–2	1–2	1–1	0–2
Steyning Town	3–0	0–3	4–1	2–3	2–0	0–2	0–1	3–0	3–0	3–0		1–1	0–1	0–2	1–4
Storrington	1–5	3–3	2–4	1–2	3–4	0–0	2–3	2–3	2–3	1–0	2–2		1–3	0–2	1–2
Westfield	1–1	0–1	1–2	2–1	3–2	0–1	2–3	2–2	1–1	4–2	4–2	3–4		0–3	2–4
Wick & Barnham United	0–0	3–1	2–0	2–1	4–0	2–2	2–2	2–0	0–4	4–0	5–1	5–2	3–3		3–0
Worthing United	1–0	4–0	4–1	3–0	3–0	1–2	3–0	2–1	3–1	4–3	3–2	4–0	6–2	3–1	

Source: scfl.org.uk
Legend: Blue = home team win; Yellow = draw; Red = away team win.

== Division Three ==
Sussex County Football League Division Three
- Season: 2014–15
- Champions: Southwick
- Promoted: Southwick; Sidlesham; Langney Wanderers
- Matches: 110
- Goals: 466 (4.24 per match)

Division Three featured ten clubs which competed in the division last season, along with one new club:

- Bosham, joined from the West Sussex League

Also, Hurstpierpoint merged with Burgess Hill Albion to create new club Burgess Hill & Hurst Albion.

=== League table ===
Pos	Team	Pld	W	D	L	GF	GA	GD	Pts	Promotion
1	Southwick	20	15	2	3	46	16	+30	47	Promoted to new Division One
2	Sidlesham	20	14	4	2	53	17	+36	46	Promoted to new Division One
3	Langney Wanderers	20	14	1	5	63	28	+35	43	Promoted to new Division One
4	Bosham	20	12	2	6	51	24	+27	35 (Note: Bosham and Ifield were deducted 3 points each for fielding an ineligible player.)	
5	Ifield	20	11	1	8	51	38	+13	31	
6	Billingshurst	20	9	2	9	58	46	+12	29	
7	Rottingdean Village	20	8	2	10	39	37	+2	26	
8	Roffey	20	6	5	9	39	37	+2	23	
9	Burgess Hill & Hurst Albion	20	5	4	11	26	44	−18	19	
10	Ferring	20	2	3	15	24	75	−51	9	
11	Clymping	20	1	0	19	16	104	−88	3	

Source: scfl.org.uk
Rules for classification: 1) points; 2) goal difference; 3) number of goals scored.
