= 1990–91 Sussex County Football League =

The 1990–91 Sussex County Football League season was the 66th in the history of Sussex County Football League a football competition in England.

== Division One ==
Sussex County Football League Division One
- Season: 1990–91
- Champions: Littlehampton Town
- Relegated: Seaford Town; Selsey
- Matches: 306
- Goals: 1,022 (3.34 per match)

Division One featured 16 clubs which competed in the division last season, along with two new clubs, promoted from Division Two:

- Bexhill Town
- Oakwood

=== League table ===
Pos	Team	Pld	W	D	L	GF	GA	GD	Pts	Qualification or relegation
1	Littlehampton Town	34	24	5	5	89	30	+59	77	
2	Peacehaven & Telscombe	34	24	5	5	70	31	+39	77	
3	Langney Sports	34	23	5	6	89	42	+47	74	
4	Pagham	34	20	7	7	85	44	+41	67	
5	Wick	34	18	5	11	61	49	+12	59	
6	Burgess Hill Town	34	17	7	10	66	43	+23	58	
7	Three Bridges	34	15	9	10	65	47	+18	54	
8	Arundel	34	14	12	8	54	46	+8	54	
9	Oakwood	34	14	5	15	53	60	−7	47	
10	Whitehawk	34	12	9	13	39	36	+3	45	
11	Shoreham	34	11	7	16	53	77	−24	40	
12	Ringmer	34	9	10	15	51	66	−15	37	
13	Hailsham Town	34	10	6	18	55	75	−20	36	
14	Haywards Heath Town	34	9	8	17	52	61	−9	35	
15	Bexhill Town	34	8	8	18	46	77	−31	32	
16	Eastbourne Town	34	7	7	20	32	54	−22	28	
17	Seaford Town	34	5	8	21	34	79	−45	23	Relegated to Division Two
18	Selsey	34	3	3	28	28	105	−77	12	Relegated to Division Two

Source: nonleaguematters
Rules for classification: 1) points; 2) goal difference; 3) number of goals scored.

== Division Two ==
Sussex County Football League Division Two
- Season: 1990–91
- Champions: Newhaven
- Promoted: Newhaven; Chichester City
- Relegated: Franklands Village
- Matches: 240
- Goals: 724 (3.02 per match)

Division Two featured twelve clubs which competed in the division last season, along with four new clubs.

- Clubs relegated from Division One:
  - Lancing
  - Redhill
- Clubs promoted from Division Three:
  - Sidley United
  - Worthing United

=== League table ===
Pos	Team	Pld	W	D	L	GF	GA	GD	Pts	Qualification or relegation
1	Newhaven	30	20	4	6	60	30	+30	64	Promoted to Division One
2	Chichester City	30	18	8	4	56	24	+32	62	Promoted to Division One
3	Horsham YMCA	30	17	7	6	45	23	+22	58	
4	Redhill	30	15	8	7	53	38	+15	53	
5	Portfield	30	14	7	9	60	38	+22	49	
6	Worthing United	30	14	6	10	53	42	+11	48	
7	Lancing	30	14	6	10	39	33	+6	48	
8	Broadbridge Heath	30	14	4	12	57	47	+10	46	
9	Bosham	30	12	6	12	50	53	−3	42	
10	Stamco	30	11	5	14	42	37	+5	38	
11	Little Common Albion	30	10	7	13	39	53	−14	37	
12	Midhurst & Easebourne	30	8	7	15	40	58	−18	31	
13	Crowborough Athletic	30	5	10	15	35	61	−26	25	
14	Saltdean United	30	5	9	16	31	60	−29	24	
15	Sidley United	30	5	8	17	42	70	−28	23	
16	Franklands Village	30	4	6	20	22	57	−35	18	Relegated to Division Three

Source: nonleaguematters
Rules for classification: 1) points; 2) goal difference; 3) number of goals scored.

== Division Three ==
Sussex County Football League Division Three
- Season: 1990–91
- Champions: Ifield
- Promoted: East Preston; East Grinstead
- Matches: 156
- Goals: 504 (3.23 per match)

Division Three featured eleven clubs which competed in the division last season, along with two new clubs, relegated from Division Two:

- Ferring
- Storrington

=== League table ===
Pos	Team	Pld	W	D	L	GF	GA	GD	Pts	Qualification or relegation
1	Ifield	24	13	8	3	46	24	+22	47	
2	East Preston	24	14	4	6	51	36	+15	46	Promoted to Division Two
3	East Grinstead	24	13	6	5	45	23	+22	45	Promoted to Division Two
4	Withdean	24	13	5	6	45	34	+11	44	
5	Mile Oak	24	10	9	5	52	40	+12	39	
6	Hassocks	24	10	4	10	37	35	+2	34	
7	Forest	24	8	7	9	49	48	+1	31	
8	Rottingdean	24	8	7	9	36	42	−6	31	
9	Ferring	24	6	7	11	36	41	−5	25	
10	Storrington	24	5	9	10	27	39	−12	24	
11	Leftovers Sports Club	24	6	5	13	18	42	−24	23	
12	Buxted	24	5	6	13	29	42	−13	21	
13	Hurstpierpoint	24	5	3	16	33	58	−25	18	

Source: nonleaguematters
Rules for classification: 1) points; 2) goal difference; 3) number of goals scored.
