= Solomon Henry =

Montserratian footballer

Personal information
- Full name: Solomon James Kirnon Henry
- Date of birth: 21 October 1983 (age 43)
- Position: Midfielder

Senior career*
Years	Team	Apps	(Gls)
2003–2004	Barnet	4	(0)
2004	Erith & Belvedere		
2004–2005	Waltham Forest	27	(0)
2005–2006	Ashford Town (Kent)	49	(2)
2007–2008	Leyton		
2008	St Albans City		
2008–2009	Billericay Town		
2009	Northwood		
2010–2011	Leyton		
2011	Horsham YMCA		

International career^{‡}
2014–2019	Montserrat	7	(0)
- * Club domestic league appearances and goals as of 11:19, 23 March 2018 (UTC) ‡ National team caps and goals as of 16:02, 17 November 2019 (UTC)

Solomon James Kirnon Henry (born 21 October 1983) is a Montserratian international footballer who plays as a midfielder.

== Career ==
He has played club football for Barnet, Erith & Belvedere, Waltham Forest, Ashford Town (Kent), Leyton, St Albans City, Billericay Town, Northwood and Horsham YMCA.

He made his international debut for Montserrat in 2014.
