= Mile Oak F.C. =

English football club based in Brighton and Hove

Coordinates: 50°51′09.80″N 0°13′33.61″W

Mile Oak
- Full name: Mile Oak Football Club
- Nickname: The Oak
- Founded: 1960
- Ground: Chalky Road, Mile Oak
- Capacity: 1,500
- Chairman: Phil Brotherton
- Manager: Alex Harris (Interim)
- League: Southern Combination Division One
- 2025–26: Southern Combination Division One, 10th of 18
Home colours	Away colours

Mile Oak Football Club are a football club based in Mile Oak, Brighton and Hove, England. They were established in 1960 and joined the Sussex County League in 1987. In the 2005–06 season, they reached the 2nd round of the FA Vase. They are currently members of the Southern Combination Division One and play at Chalky Road and had their highest recorded match attendance playing against Seaford during the 24/25 season.

== History ==
Mile Oak FC was formed in 1960 and started in Division Eight of the Brighton, Hove & District Football League and won the division at the first attempt, and promoted to Division Six. Further promotion followed in the 1963–64 season when the club finished as runners up in Division Six and the club was promoted again the following season. The club's first attempt at Division Four saw them finish as champions, however four seasons later and the club was back in Division Five. A season later they were back in Division Four and the 1971–72 campaign saw them finish as runners-up and promotion Division Two. The club had instant success in Division Two finishing as champions, a feat they repeated the next season in Division One The 1980–81 season saw the club become winners of the Brighton League.

In 1986 made the decision to leave the Brighton, Hove & District Football League to become a senior club in the Sussex County League, and an application was made to join the Southern Counties Combination League, which was a feeder into the Sussex 'pyramid'. After just one season, the club won promotion to Division Three of the County League as champions.

After five seasons, promotion was gained to Division Two in 1991–92, as runners-up to Hassocks, and then to Division One as champions in 1994–95. They stayed in this division for three seasons, and were relegated back to Division Two in 1997–98

In 2005–06 they won some silverware after defeating Sidlesham 1–0 in the Final of the Division Two Challenge Cup.

In the 2008–09 season the club again gained promotion to Division One but only survived one season back in the top flight of the Sussex League.

== Ground ==
Mile Oak, play their home games at Mile Oak Recreation Ground, Chalky Road, Mile Oak, Brighton, BN41 2WS

In 1995 Floodlights were added to the ground, and permanent dugouts were erected in 2002.

During the 2003 close-season the ground was bought up to FA Cup & FA Vase standards. This included new separate male/female toilets, a segregated walkway for players and officials up to the pitch, and hard standing on three sides of pitch (stand side and both ends).

== Honours ==
- Sussex County League Division Two
  - Champions: 1994–95
  - Runners Up: 2008–09
- Sussex County League Division Three
  - Runners Up:1991–92
- Brighton, Hove & District Football League Premier Division:
  - Champions (1): 1980–81
  - Runners-up (1): 1983–84, 1984–85, 1985–86
- Brighton, Hove & District Football League Division One:
  - Champions (1): 1973–74
- Brighton, Hove & District Football League Division Two:
  - Champions (1): 1972–73
- Brighton, Hove & District Football League Division Four:
  - Champions (1): 1965–66
  - Runners-up (1): 1971–72
- Brighton, Hove & District Football League Division six:
  - Runners up (1): 1963–64
- Brighton, Hove & District Football League Division Eight:
  - Champions (1): 1960–61
- Sussex County Division Two Cup
  - Winners:2005–06
- Brighton League League Cup
  - Winners:1986
- Vernon-Wentworth Cup
  - Winners:1986

== Records ==
- Highest League Position:
  - 16th in Sussex County Division one: 1996–97
- FA CUP Best Performance
  - First Qualifying Round: 1996–97, 2004–05
- FA VASE Best Performance
  - Second Round: 2005–06, 2008–09
- Highest Attendance:
  - 150 vs Seaford Town : 2024–25

== Past performance ==
Season	League	Place
1987/88	SUSSEX-3	4/14
1988/89	SUSSEX-3	10/16
1989/90	SUSSEX-3	3/14
1990/91	SUSSEX-3	5/13
1991/92	SUSSEX-3	2/14
1992/93	SUSSEX-2	9/19
1993/94	SUSSEX-2	8/18
1994/95	SUSSEX-2	1/18
1995/96	SUSSEX-1	17/20
1996/97	SUSSEX-1	16/20
1997/98	SUSSEX-1	18/20
1998/99	SUSSEX-2	5/18
1999/2000	SUSSEX-2	11/18
2000/01	SUSSEX-2	15/18
2001/02	SUSSEX-2	14/18
2002/03	SUSSEX-2	16/18
2003/04	SUSSEX-2	7/18
2004/05	SUSSEX-2	11/18
2005/06	SUSSEX-2	8/18
2006/07	SUSSEX-2	9/18
2007/08	SUSSEX-2	5/18
2008/09	SUSSEX-2	2/18
2009/10	SUSSEX-1	20/20
2010/11	SUSSEX-2	7/18
2011/12	SUSSEX-2	10/18
2012/13	SUSSEX-2	7/18
2013/14	SUSSEX-2	7/17
2014/15	SUSSEX-2	5/15
2015/16	Sussex Combination 1	6/17
2016/17	Sussex Combination 1	4/18
