= Portfield F.C. =

Portfield Football Club

Coordinates: 50.841527°N 0.75991541°W

Portfield
- Full name: Portfield Football Club
- Founded: 1896
- Dissolved: 2000
- Ground: Church Road, Chichester

Portfield Football Club was a football club based in the Portfield area of Chichester, England. Established in 1896, they merged with Chichester City in 2000 to form Chichester City United, later renamed Chichester City.

== History ==
The club was established in 1896. After World War II the club won the Sussex Junior Cup and the West Sussex League.

In 1963 Portfield joined Division Two of the Sussex County League. They won Division Two in 1972–73 and were promoted to Division One. However, they were relegated back to Division Two after finishing bottom of Division One in 1974–75. They subsequently became a yo-yo club, being promoted in 1978–79, relegated in 1980–81, promoted as Division Two champions in 1983–84, relegated in 1988–89 and promoted as champions again in 1991–92. The club subsequently remained in Division One until 2000, when they merged with Chichester City to form Chichester City United, playing at Portfield's Church Road ground while Chichester City's Oaklands Park was redeveloped.

== Ground ==
The club had no permanent ground at the time of their establishment, playing on various pitches including at Arundel Park Estate and St. James Square. They eventually settled at Downers, a cow meadow. However, they were not allowed to mow the grass, leading to the club being nicknamed "Field".

In the 1950s the site of Downers became a gravel quarry pit, with Portfield playing at the Florence Road recreation ground until moving to Church Road in 1958. The ground was initially shared with a cricket team, before the football club became the sole tenant in 1961. A clubhouse was built in 1969, new dressing rooms were built in 1983 and floodlights erected in 1987.

== Honours ==
- Sussex County League
  - Division Two champions 1972–73, 1983–84, 1991–92

== Records ==
- Best FA Cup performance: Second qualifying round, 1997–98
- Best FA Vase performance: Second round, 1984–85, 1993–94
