= East Preston F.C. =

Association football club in England

Coordinates: 50°48′49.820″N 0°28′56.730″W

East Preston
- Full name: East Preston Football Club
- Nicknames: EP, EPFC
- Founded: 1966
- Ground: The Lashmar, East Preston
- Chairman: Tim Teasel
- Manager: Kevin Raynor
- League: Southern Combination Division One
- 2024–25: Southern Combination Division One, 14th of 20
Home colours	Away colours

East Preston Football Club is a football club based in East Preston, near Littlehampton, West Sussex, England. They are currently members of the Southern Combination Division One and play at the Lashmar.

== History ==
The original East Preston Football Club was established in 1947, but folded within a decade. A new club was formed in 1966 and joined the Worthing & District League. They moved up to the West Sussex League in 1968, going on to win the league's Premier Division in 1977–78 and then three consecutive titles between 1980–81 and 1982–83. In 1983 the club were founder members of the new Division Three of the Sussex County League. Although they won the division at the first attempt, they were not promoted due to their ground failing to meet the requirements, and remained in Division Three until finishing as runners-up in 1990–91, after which they were promoted to Division Two. However, the club were immediately relegated back to Division Three after finishing bottom of Division Two in 1991–92.

East Preston were promoted to Division Two again after finishing as Division Three runners-up in 1994–95; the season also saw them win the Division Three Cup and the Sussex Intermediate Cup. They spent three seasons in Division Two before winning it in 1997–98, earning promotion to Division One. Although the club was relegated back to Division Two after finishing bottom of Division One in 2001–02, they were promoted back to Division One at the end of the following season after a third-place finish. The club remained in Division One until the end of the 2008–09 season, when they were relegated to Division Two. However, after winning Division Two and the Division Two Cup in 2011–12, they returned to Division One. They won the Sussex RUR Cup the following season, beating Broadbridge Heath 1–0 in the final. The club went on to win the Division One title in 2013–14, but were denied promotion to the Isthmian League after failing a ground grading inspection; league runners-up East Grinstead Town were promoted in their place.

In 2015 the Sussex County League was renamed the Southern Combination, with Division One becoming the Premier Division. After finishing second-from-bottom of the Premier Division in 2015–16, East Preston were relegated to Division One. The following season they finished third in Division One and were promoted back to the Premier Division. In 2021–22 the club finished bottom of the Premier Division, winning one league game all season, and were relegated to Division One.

== Ground ==
The club play at The Lashmar on Roundstone Drive. Floodlights were installed in the early 2000s and a 50-seat stand built during the 2002–03 season.

== Honours ==
- Southern Combination
  - Division One Champions 2013–14
  - Division Two champions 1997–98, 2011–12
  - Division Three champions 1983–84
  - Division Two Cup winners 2011–12
  - Division Three Cup winners 1987–88, 1994–95
- West Sussex League
  - Premier Division champions 1977–78, 1980–81, 1981–82, 1982–83
  - Malcolm Simmonds memorial Cup winners 1980–81, 1982–83
- Sussex RUR Cup
  - Winners 2012–13
- Sussex Intermediate Cup
  - Winners 1994–95
- Brighton Charity Cup
  - Winners 2009–10

== Records ==
- Best FA Cup performance: Third qualifying round, 2004–05
- Best FA Vase performance: Fifth round, 2013–14

== See also ==
- East Preston F.C. players
