= Oakwood F.C. =

Association football club in England

Coordinates: 51°07′45.59″N 0°09′46.98″W

Oakwood
- Full name: Oakwood Football Club
- Nickname: The Oaks
- Founded: 1962
- Ground: Tinsley Lane, Crawley
- Chairman: Mark Gilbert
- Manager: Mark Gilbert
- League: Southern Combination Division One
- 2024–25: Southern Combination Division One, 12th of 20
Home colours	Away colours

Oakwood Football Club are a football club based in Crawley, England. They were established in 1962 and joined the Sussex County League Division Three in 1984. In 2005–06 season, they were champions of the Sussex County League Division Two and moved up to Division One, where they remained until relegation back to Division Two in 2010. They are currently members of the Southern Combination Division One and play at Tinsley Lane.

Their nickname is the "Oaks" and they have a local rivalry with neighbours Three Bridges.

== History ==
Founded in 1962 by pupils from St Wilfrids School which traditionally favoured Rugby football, Oakwood FC took its name from the estate where the school was situated. Three seasons after playing against other local school teams, the club applied to join the Crawley and District Football League for the 1966–67 season.

After five years the club had reached C&DFL Division One. During the 1972–73 season the club reached the Sussex FA Junior Cup Final losing 1–0, and were again runners up in the same competition the following season to the same score-line.

However, by the time they had reached their second consecutive County Final, they had been crowned Crawley League Division One champions and Winners of the Crawley Senior Cup.

By 1980 the club was beginning to re-structure and joined the Southern Counties Combination League, where they finished fourth in the first season, and incredibly runners up the following year also winning the league Cup.

In 1983 the club purchased its present home at Tinsley lane, Oakwood Park. With the extension of the Sussex County Football League by introducing a Third Division for season 1984–85, the club were accepted on application and emerged as Champions at the first attempt.

After promotion and adjusting to life in Division Two the club finished third during their third year, and should have missed promotion as the old ruling was two down two up. However promotion was granted to Division One as Bexhill Town, who had finished as runners up, did not have adequate facilities for the top Division at that time. Unfortunately the Oaks were relegated after just one season.

The 1989–90 season saw the installation of the floodlights at Oakwood Park, and the club finishing the season as runners up to Bexhill Town. This season also saw first senior trophy for the club in the shape of the Division Two cup, where they defeated Stamco 2–1 in the final.

1992–93 saw the club reach the final of the Sussex Senior Cup, played at the old Goldstone Ground, former home to Brighton & Hove Albion, losing to Wick 3–1.

After six years in the top Division of the Sussex County League the 1996–97 season saw the club relegated back to the second division. They remained in the second division until the end of the 2005–06 when they went back up as champions.

The committees efforts off the field were recognised with the granting of the English National FAs Club Charter Standard award in 2009.

== Ground ==
Oakwood play their home games at Oakwood Sports & Social Club, Oakwood Park, Tinsley Lane, Crawley, West Sussex, RH10 8AR.

== Honours ==
- Sussex County League Division Two
  - Winners: 2005–06
  - Runners Up: 1989–90
- Sussex County League Division Three
  - Winners: 1984–85
- Southern Combination Football League Division One Cup
  - Runners Up: 2017–18
- Sussex County Division Two Cup
  - Winners: 1989–90
- Sussex Senior Cup
  - Runners Up: 1992–93
- Sussex FA Junior Cup
  - Runners Up: 1972–73, 1973–74
- Crawley League Division 1
  - Winners: 1973–74
- Crawley Senior Cup
  - Winners: 1973–74

== Club Records ==
- Highest League Position:
  - 8th in Sussex County Division One: 1992–93
- FA CUP Best Performance
  - First Qualifying Round: 1990–91, 1997–98
- FA VASE Best Performance
  - First Round: 1988–89, 1989–90, 1991–92, 1992–93, 1993–94, 1999–00, 2001–02, 2004–05, 2006–07
- Highest Attendance:
  - 187 vs Alfold: 26 Oct 2024
- Biggest Win:
  - 8-0 vs Newhaven, 8 Nov 1997
- Biggest defeat:
  - 0-10 vs Shoreham, 24 Sep 2016 (FA Vase, 2nd Qualifying Round)
- Most appearances:
  - Gerald Manville - 385
  - Peter Brackpool - 319
  - Lee Butcher - 230
  - Glen Woodburn - 228
  - Joe Clark - 209
- Most goals:
  - Gerald Manville - 154
  - Zak Newman - 136
  - Paul Green - 105
  - Phil Richardson - 91

== Managers ==
- Mark Gilbert (June 2011–present)
- Nathan Pullen, Joe Clark, Pat Massaro
- Matt Heasman
- Shaun Donnelly, Steve Bold
- John Mist (March 2009 – )*
- Lee Butcher (Dec 2007 – Mar 2009)
- Bob Pyle (Nov 2003 – Dec 2007)
- Mark Dunk (May 2003 – Nov 2003)
- Andy Maddox (May 2000 – May 2003)
- Neil Blackwell & Ali West (Jan 1998 – May 2000)
- Bryn Marshall (Sep 1996 – Jan 1998)
- Mark Richardson/Paul Crimmen (Sep 1995 – Sep 96)
- Alan Gould (Nov 1993 – Aug 1995)
- Bryn Marshall (Jan 1992 – Nov 1993)
- Tony Reece (Nov 1988 – Jan 1995)
- Rick Conley
- Tony Walker

== Reserves & Under 23s ==
The team's second eleven played in the Sussex County League Reserve Section but moved to the Suburban Football League for the 2008-09
The club started an Under 23 side for the 2019–20 season playing in the Southern Combination Football League U23 West Division. Moved to the North Division for the 2021-22 campaign.

The 2024 season saw the addition of an Under 18 side competing in the SCFL. The club also re-introduced a reserve team (formerly DCK Maidenbower) which joined the Mid-Sussex Football League, competing in the Championship division.
