= Horsham YM F.C. =

Association football club in England

Coordinates: 51.057655°N 0.32388747°W

Horsham YM
- Full name: Horsham YM Football Club
- Nickname: The YM
- Founded: 1898
- Ground: Gorings Mead, Horsham
- Capacity: 1,575 (150 seated)
- Chairman: Geoff Foreman (Acting)
- Manager: Alex Walsh & Will Hendon
- League: Southern Combination Premier Division
- 2025–26: Southern Combination Premier Division, 4th of 20
- Website: horshamymcafc.co.uk
Home colours	Away colours

Horsham YM Football Club is a football club based in Horsham, West Sussex, England. They are currently members of the Southern Combination Premier Division and play at Gorings Mead.

== History ==
The club was established as Horsham YMCA in 1898. They played in Horsham & District League before joining the Crawley and District Football League. They subsequently moved up to the Mid-Sussex League, where they played until joining Division Two of the Sussex County League in 1959. The club won the Division Two Cup in 1959–60 and 1961–62 before winning the Division Two title in 1965–66, earning promotion to Division One. They went on to win the league's John O'Hara Cup in 1966–67, 1967–68 and 1981–82.

Horsham were relegated to Division Two at the end of the 1981–82 season. However, they won the Division Two title at the first attempt, earning an immediate promotion back to Division One. They were relegated again after finishing bottom of Division One in 1987–88. They won the Division Two Cup in 1994–95, also finishing third in the division to earn promotion back to Division One. The club won Sussex RUR Cup in 2000–01 and the John O'Hara Cup the following season. They won the Division One title in 2004–05, but were denied promotion due to ground grading regulations. However, after winning Division One again the following season and making improvements to their Gorings Mead ground, the club were promoted to Division One South of the Isthmian League.

The 2007–08 season saw Horsham finish in the relegation zone, resulting in relegation back to Division One of the Sussex County League. However, after finishing third in division the following season, they were promoted back to Division One South of the Isthmian League. In 2010–11 the club finished bottom of Division One South and were relegated to the Sussex County League again. They won the Sussex RUR Cup in 2013–14, beating East Preston on penalties in the final. In 2015 the league was renamed the Southern Combination, with Division One becoming the Premier Division.

In 2023–24 Horsham won the Sussex RUR Cup for a third time, defeating Haywards Heath Town on penalties in the final. In 2025 the club was renamed Horsham YM. They finished fourth in the Premier Division in 2025–26, qualifying for the promotion play-offs, in which they lost 3–0 to Guernsey in the semi-finals.

== Ground ==
The club initially played at Lyons Field, named after the Lyons family who owned much land around the town. In 1929 they moved to Gorings Mead, which backed onto Horsham's Queen Street ground. YMCA later purchased the freehold to the site. The ground has a brick-built seated stand with a cantilever roof on one side of the pitch, with its seats taken from the Goldstone Ground, with a covered standing area on the other.

== Honours ==
- Southern Combination
  - Division One champions 2004–05, 2005–06
  - Division Two champions 1965–66, 1982–83
  - John O'Hara Cup winners 1966–67, 1967–68, 1981–82, 2001–02
  - Division Two Cup winners 1959–60, 1961–62, 1994–95
- Sussex RUR Cup
  - Winners 2000–01, 2013–14, 2023–24

== Records ==
- Best FA Cup performance: Fourth qualifying round, 1999–2000
- Best FA Trophy performance: First qualifying round, 2006–07, 2007–08
- Best FA Vase performance: Fourth round, 1999–2000
- Record attendance: 950 vs Chelmsford City, FA Cup, 2000

== See also ==
- Horsham YMCA F.C. players
