= Ringmer F.C. =

Association football club in England

Ringmer
- Full name: Ringmer Football Club
- Nickname(s): The Blues
- Founded: 1905
- Dissolved: 2020
- Ground: The Caburn Ground, Ringmer
- 2017–18: Southern Combination Football League; Division One, 4th (resigned)
Home colours

Ringmer Football Club were a football club based in Ringmer, near Lewes, East Sussex, England. In 2020, they merged with AFC Ringmer to form Ringmer A.F.C.

== History ==
Ringmer Football Club was established in 1905. Initially, they joined the Lewes and District League. After being disbanded during World War One they continued in local football and achieved their first trophy in 1926 when they lifted the Sussex Junior Cup. In 1951, Ringmer joined the Brighton & Hove District League and began to climb up the divisions, until, in 1963, Ringmer was accepted into the Sussex County League. Within three seasons, the Blues had sealed third spot in Division Two. In 1967, they also lifted the Division Two Invitation Cup. The club won Division Two in 1968–69 and gained promotion to Division One. In the 1970–71 season, Ringmer became champions of Division One for the first and so far only time, and also reached the first round of the FA Cup, where as the first ever village side to reach the first round, they lost 3–0 away to Colchester United F.C. In the 1972–73 season, the side finished runners up in Division One, while also winning the Sussex Senior Cup for the first time in their history.

In 1986, Ringmer were relegated back to Division Two, but returned to Division One in 1989 after finishing runners-up. The club has since finished runners-up in Division One twice, 2001–02 and 2005–06. In the 2008–09 season, however, the club was plunged into administration after Chairman Richard Soan resigned, but, under the management of Bob Munnery, the unpaid squad was able to make up an imposed deduction of ten points to finish tenth.

After their recovery from administration, the club saw a series of similar mid-table finishes over the next few years. In the 2014–15 season though, they finished 18th in the Sussex County League Division One, and were relegated to Division Two, renamed the Southern Combination Football League Division One from the 2015–16 season. Ringmer finished 4th in the league at the end of the 2017–18 season and resigned from the league. Mid Sussex Football League side A.F.C. Ringmer moved into the Caburn ground for their home games.

It was announced on 1 June 2020 that Ringmer FC and AFC Ringmer had merged to become Ringmer A.F.C., and would continue to play in the Mid Sussex Football League for the 2020–21 season.

== Ground ==
Ringmer played their home games at The Caburn Ground, Anchor Field, Ringmer, Lewes, East Sussex, BN8 5QN.

In July 2020 as part of the merger with AFC Ringmer the club was relocated to a new facility at the Caburn Community Ground, Kings Academy, Ringmer, BN8 5RB.

== Honours ==
- Sussex County League Division One
  - Champions: 1970–71
  - Runners-up: 1972–73, 2001–02, 2005–06
- Sussex County League Division Two
  - Champions: 1968–69
  - Runners-up: 1988–89

=== Cup honours ===
- The Sussex Senior Challenge Cup
  - Winners (1): 1972-73
  - Runners-up (2): 1980–81, 2004–05
- The Sussex Royal Ulster Rifles Charity Cup
  - Winners (1): 2004–05
  - Runners-up (3): 1970–71, 1978–79, 1991–92
- Peter Bentley Cup
  - Runners-up (2): 2001–02, 2007-08
- Brighton Charity Cup
  - Runners-up (2): 2005–06, 2009-10
- Sussex Junior Cup
  - Winners (1): 1925–26
- Division Two Invitation Cup
  - Winners (1): 1966–67
- Chandlers Trophy
  - Winners (5): 1997–98, 2001–02, 2003–04, 2004–05, 2005-06

== Records ==
- FA Cup
  - First round proper: 1970–71
- FA Vase
  - Third round (2): 1977–78, 2007–08
- SCFA Floodlight Cup
  - Fourth round: 1998–99
