= Saltdean United F.C. =

Association football club in England

Coordinates: 50°48′53.32″N 0°02′01.34″W

Saltdean United
- Full name: Saltdean United Football Club
- Nickname: The Tigers
- Founded: 1966
- Ground: Hill Park, Saltdean
- Chairman: Bob Thomas
- Manager: Lol Edwards
- League: Southern Combination Division One
- 2025–26: Southern Combination Division One, 11th of 18
- Website: www.saltdeanunited.co.uk
Home colours	Away colours

Saltdean United Football Club is a football club based in Saltdean in the city of Brighton & Hove on the south coast of England. As of the 2025–26 season, Saltdean compete in the Southern Combination Division One and play at Hill Park.

== History ==
Saltdean United formed in 1966 by seven founding members who were inspired by the victorious England World Cup campaign. The club started life in the local Brighton Saturday League and gradually moved up their divisional structure over the years. Following the acquisition of their picturesque ground at Hill Park in the suburbs of Brighton, the club joined Division 3 of the Sussex County League in 1984–85, finishing third in their first season. More success followed and a promotion to Division 2 and senior football came in 1988–89 when Saltdean finished as champions. The next seven seasons were spent in this division, with the “Tigers” comfortably winning Division 2 in 1995–96 with games to spare. Promotion to Division 1 saw the clubhouse completely revamped and floodlights installed, the first Sussex County League club to invest in the impressive Musco system from the US. The Tigers quickly established themselves as a force in the top division, finishing 4th in their inaugural season and reaching the final of the Sussex Senior Cup only to narrowly lose out to St. Leonards by the odd goal.

In 1998–99 the club finished 2nd, and 3rd in 1999–2000 season when they also lifted the John O’Hara Cup, beating Burgess Hill Town after extra time in a thrilling match at Three Bridges. In 2002 the club suffered its first ever relegation to Division 2 and in 2007 were relegated again back to Division 3 where they remained for several years until 2011 when the club won the Sussex County League Division 3 Challenge Cup. A positive run in 2011–12 season saw the Tigers show their true spirit as they began the steady climb back up. As runners up in the league they were promoted back to Division 2 and also lifted the Vernon Wentworth Cup.

A difficult period followed, with several years spent in the lower half of Division 2 until the 2015–16 season when a change of circumstances, interest and investment in the club brought a new lease of life to the Tigers. Led by a celebrated ex player with the support of local businessmen the club was transformed on and off the pitch. Within a single season Saltdean went from bottom to top of the league gaining promotion back to the top flight of Sussex football in 2017 and in 2018–19 the Tigers were the proud winners of the Peter Bentley Challenge Cup.

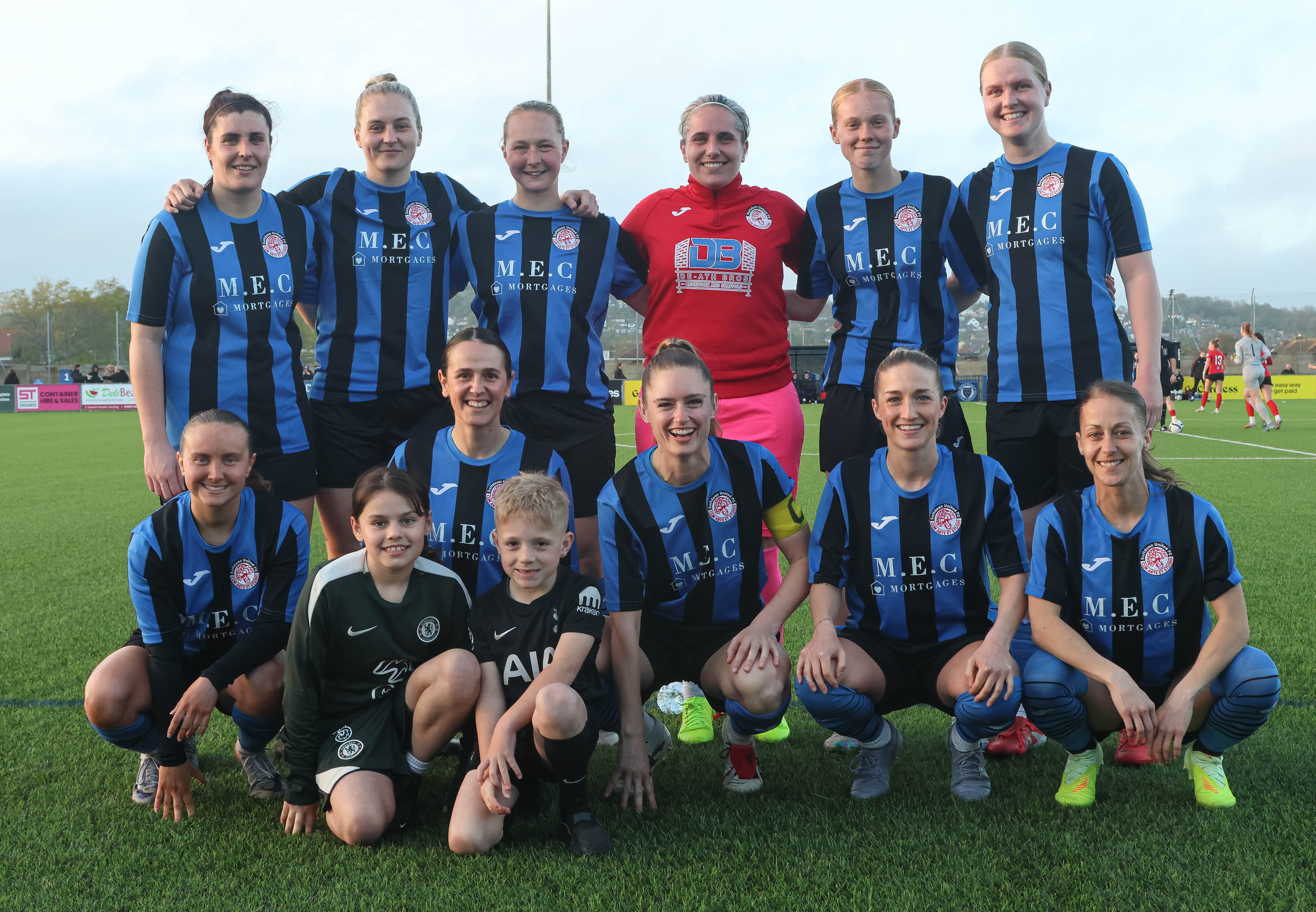
Saltdean Utd Women in April 2026 at Lewes

In 2017 the Saltdean United Women's team were formed under the management of Joe McTiffen. The Women have gone from strength to strength and have enjoyed several promotions in a short period of time. As runners up of the Sussex Women's league in 2017–18, they were promoted to the South East Counties Premier Division. In 2018–19 as runners up in the league they were promoted to the London and South East Premier Division and were winners of the South East Counties Women's League Cup.

With the start of a decade the club maintained its performance, with the First Team enjoying a strong start to the 2020–21 season in the Southern Combination Football League Premier Division under the management of Bryan O’Toole. The Women's team continue to strengthen their position with the addition of a new Development Squad in 2020 and a partnership with Withdean Youth FC to provide a clear pathway for girls into senior Women's football.

The hard work continues throughout the club, with representation in more leagues and divisions than ever before in the club's history with Men's and Women's First Teams, Women's Development Squad, Men's Under 23's and Under 18's and Youth Teams from Under 7's to Under 16's.

The 2021–22 season saw Saltdean finish second in the division and despite having a high enough points-per-game record to gain promotion to the Isthmian League, the club were denied promotion after failing ground grading requirements.

== Ground ==
Saltdean United play their home games at Hill Park, Coombe Vale, Saltdean, Brighton, BN2 8HJ.

== Honours ==
=== Cup honours ===
- John O'Hara League Challenge Cup
  - Winners (1) 1999–00
- Peter Bentley League Challenge Cup
  - Winners (1) 2018–19
- The Sussex Royal Ulster Rifles Charity Cup
  - Runners Up (3): 1995–96, 1999–00, 2021–22
- Sussex County Football League Division Three Cup:
  - Runners up (1): 1985–86

== Club Records ==
- Highest League Position:
  - 2nd in Sussex County League Division One: 1998–99
- FA CUP Best Performance
  - Third Qualifying Round: 2000–01
- FA VASE Best Performance
  - First Round: 1999–00

== Notable former players ==
1. Players that have played or managed in the football league or any foreign equivalent to this level (i.e. fully professional league).
2. Players with full international caps.
3. Players that hold a club record or have captained the club.

- (England) Jay Lovett – (1997–1998) played for Brentford
- (England) Glenn Burvill – played for Aldershot, Reading and Fulham
- Paul Ifill – (?–1998) Barbados International
- (England) Glen Davies – () played for Hartlepool United
- (England) Paul Hubbard – (1976–1979) played for Brighton and Hove Albion
