= Broadbridge Heath F.C. =

Association football club in England

Coordinates: 51.0634°N 0.3593°W

Broadbridge Heath
- Full name: Broadbridge Heath Football Club
- Nickname: The Bears
- Founded: 1919
- Ground: High Wood Hill Sports Ground, Broadbridge Heath
- Chairman: Chris Higgins
- Manager: Chris Simmons
- League: Isthmian League South East Division
- 2025–26: Isthmian League South East Division, 15th of 22
Home colours	Away colours

Broadbridge Heath Football Club is a football club based in Broadbridge Heath, near Horsham, in West Sussex, England. They are currently members of the Isthmian League South East Division and play at the High Wood Hill Sports Ground.

== History ==
The club was established in 1919 by demobilised soldiers. Despite having only twelve players, they won the Horsham & District League and the Challenge Cup in their first season. When the league merged into the West Sussex League in 1970, Broadbridge Heath were placed in Division Three, winning the Division Three Charity Cup in the first season in the league and earning promotion to Division Two in their second. They promoted to the Premier Division after winning the Division One title in 1975–76, but left to join the Southern Counties Combination League in 1978. When this league merged into the Sussex County League in 1983, the club were placed in the new Division Three.

After finishing third in 1987–88, the club were promoted to Division Two. They remained in Division Two until a third-place finish in 1997–98 saw them promoted to Division One. However, the club finishing bottom of Division One the following season and were relegated back to Division Two. In 2007–08 they finished second-from-bottom of Division Two and were relegated to Division Three. Despite only finishing fifth in 2011–12, they were promoted back to Division Two, and after finishing as runners-up in Division Two in 2013–14, the club were promoted to Division One. In 2015 the Sussex County League was renamed the Southern Combination, with Division One becoming the Premier Division. The club were Premier Division champions in 2022–23, earning promotion to the South East Division of the Isthmian League.

== Ground ==
Between 1979 and 1987 the club played at Wickhurst Lane, a former Army camp. The land was bought by Tesco for redevelopment, with a supermarket and leisure centre built on the site. The leisure centre featured a multi-purpose arena including an athletics track surrounding a grass playing surface with a large seated stand on one side of the track. The football club became tenants at the new arena.

In the summer of 2019, Broadbridge Heath moved to a new ground built next to the Bridge leisure centre, called High Wood Hill Sports Ground.

== Management ==
Position	Incumbent
First Team Manager	Chris Simmons
First Team Assistant Manager	Carl Downs
First Team Goalkeeping Coach	Chris Polsen & Nick Grogan
First Team Coaches	Carl Downs & Sean Jarvie
Physios	Ellie Barry, Josh Pumfrey & Naomi Cole
U23 Manager	Chris Ellis
U23 Assistant Manager	Alex Bethell
U23 Coach	Dave Letley

== Honours ==
- Southern Combination League
  - Premier Division champions 2022–23
- West Sussex League
  - Division One champions 1975–76
  - Division Three Charity Cup winners 1970–71

== Records ==
- Best FA Cup performance: Second qualifying round, 2024–25
- Best FA Trophy performance: Third qualifying round, 2025–26
- Best FA Vase performance: Second round, 2017–18

== See also ==
- Broadbridge Heath F.C. players
