= Storrington F.C. =

Association football club in England

Coordinates: 50°55′13.71″N 0°27′49.67″W

Storrington
- Full name: Storrington Community Football Club
- Nickname: The Swans
- Founded: 1882
- Ground: The Recreation Ground, Storrington
- Chairman: Nigel Dyer
- Manager: Dave Ray
- League: Southern Combination Division Two
- 2025–26: Southern Combination Division Two, 10th of 15
Home colours	Away colours

Storrington Football Club is a football club based in Storrington, near Horsham, West Sussex, England. Storrington FC were formed in 1882, where they were one of the founder members of the first Sussex football league. They played up until the First World War, then reformed after the war in 1919. They mainly played in the local Worthing league, where they enjoyed much success. They then stepped up and joined Sussex County League Division Two in 1976. Since then, they have been relegated to Division Three on three occasions, but have been promoted back to Division Two after a three-season spell in the lower division on each occasion. They are currently members of the Southern Combination Division Two and play at the Recreation Ground.

== History ==
Storrington FC was officially formed in 1882 when the first Sussex football league was formed. Not much is known about this time up until the First World War. Then the club started up again in the 1919/1920 season. This time playing in the Worthing league then joined West Sussex League in 1973. The Swans then spent three seasons in the West Sussex League before being elected to join Division 2 of the Sussex County League in 1976. The club then spent the next 14 years in division two, during which time they twice achieved their highest placing of 4th. In the 1989–90 season the club was relegated and over the next 12 seasons spent the time gaining promotion twice in 1993 and 1998 but were relegated back down in 1995 and 2002. The club at the beginning of the 2002–03 season started building a new clubhouse and the club had to play a number of home games at opponents' grounds due to the building work.

In the 2004–05 season the club gained promotion to Division 2, but this time as champions of Division 3 for the first time in their history. The club has remained in Division 2 since. The club has also used this stability to erect floodlights during the 2009/10 season. For the 2011–12 season a new Management Team was put in place of James Baker and Nigel Dyer, and saw the team achieve a 9th-place finish, sitting comfortably with the 8th and 7th finishes from the previous two seasons. At the end of the season James Baker quit Storrington FC to become manager of Worthing United.

The club achieved their highest finish in 2015/16 when Peter Matthews oversaw a fourth-placed finish in Division One in his first season at the club. Matthews resigned at the end of the season paving the way for long serving player John Rhodie to take over in 2016/17 in a player/manager role. Rhodie's side finished twelve in 2016/17.

== Club honours ==
- Sussex County League Division Three / Southern Combination League Division Two :
  - Winners: 2004–05, 2023–24
  - Runners-Up: 1992–93, 1997–98
- Sussex County League Division Two Cup :
  - Winners: 1978–79
  - Runners-Up: 2010–11
- Sussex County Football League Division Three Cup:
  - Winners (1): 1997–98
- Vernon Wentworth Cup :
  - Winners: 1997–98, 2002–03
- Sussex Intermediate Cup :
  - Runners-Up: 1970–71, 1985–86

== Club records ==
- Highest League Position: 4th in Sussex County League Division Two 1984–85, 1988–89
- Highest Attendance: 554 vs Pulborough 1971

== The Ground ==
Storrington play their home games at the Recreation Ground, Pulborough Rd, RH20 4HJ. The ground has been redeveloped with a new club house built in 2003 by the Parish Council, which also houses the dressing rooms. The ground also had floodlights added during the 2009/10 season. There are plans to improve the ground further with the addition of 50 seats.
