= Pagham F.C. =

Association football club in England

Pagham
- Full name: Pagham Football Club
- Nickname: The Lions
- Founded: 1903
- Ground: Nyetimber Lane, Pagham
- Capacity: 1,500
- Coordinates: 50°46′43″N 0°43′58″W
- Chairman: Kelly Heatley
- Manager: Andy'Lemmy'Ewen
- League: Southern Combination Premier Division
- 2025–26: Southern Combination Premier Division, 7th of 20
| Home colours | Away colours |

Pagham Football Club is a football club based in Pagham, near Bognor Regis, West Sussex, England. They are currently members of the Southern Combination Premier Division and play at Nyetimber Lane.

== History ==
The club was formed in 1903, starting in the Bognor & Chichester Football league, and then joining the West Sussex league. The club at the end of the 1965–66 season became champions of the West Sussex league Premier Division for the first time and repeated this success two more times in the 1968–69 and 1969–70 seasons. As well as the league success the club also achieved two Sussex Intermediate Cup wins, in the 1966–67 and 1968–69 season.

After achieving success in the West Sussex league the club joined Division Two of the Sussex County League for the 1970–71 campaign, finishing third in their first three seasons. In the 1972–73 season the club played their first ever FA Cup game drawing 0–0 with Chichester City, before losing 2–1 in the replay. In 1978–79 Pagham finished as champions of Division Two, winning promotion to the top division. The club finished fourth the following season, behind champions Chichester City, but lifted the title in 1980–81 – three points clear of runners-up Peacehaven & Telscombe, who went on to win the next two titles. Just three years later however, Pagham were relegated. Two third placings followed before the Division Two championship was lifted for the second time in 1986–87.

Better was to follow over the next two seasons, with successive Division One titles, as well as the League Challenge Cup in 1988–89. The club firmly established itself as a Division One club subsequently, without reaching the heights of the late 1980s – the best season being 1992–93, when Pagham finished as runners-up to Peacehaven. 2003–04 however, saw the club finish in the bottom three, with only the earlier liquidation of St. Leonards sparing them the drop into Division Two. There was no escape in 2004–05 however, and a similarly wretched campaign saw the Lions drop back down into Division Two.

In what could be viewed as a season of consolidation after a couple of poor years, 2005–06 saw the Lions only able to manage 13th place but 2006–07 saw them comfortably return to the top flight as champions, ten points clear of runners-up St. Francis Rangers. They were transferred to the Wessex League Premier Division for the 2022–23 season, now returned to the SCFL Premier Division for the 2023–24 season.

== Ground ==
Pagham Play their home games at Nyetimber Lane, Pagham, PO21 3JY.

Before moving to Nyetimber lane the club spent their first 47 years of existence playing on various farmers’ fields until they moved onto a field adjoining the cricket club in Nyetimber Lane in 1950. A small wooded shed was provided by a local farmer which served as a changing room until the club applied to enter the County League in 1970. Originally there was a cricket-type pavilion erected, alongside the current breeze block stand which at the time had no seats. The pavilion and an old wooden building that served as a bar were eventually replaced by the current clubhouse, with dressing rooms behind.

== Honours ==
=== League honours ===
- Sussex County League Division One
  - Champions (3): 1980–81, 1987–88, 1988–89
  - Runners-up (1): 1992–93
- Sussex County League Division Two
  - Champions (3): 1978–79, 1986–87, 2006–07
- West Sussex Football League Premier Division:
  - Champions (3): 1965–66, 1968–69, 1969–70
- West Sussex Football League Division Two South:
  - Champions (1): 1962–63

=== Cup honours ===
- The Sussex Royal Ulster Rifles Charity Cup:
  - Winners (1): 1988–89
  - Runners-up (1): 1993–94
- Sussex County League Cup
  - Winners (1): 1988–89, 2016–17
- Sussex County League Division Two Cup
  - Winners (2): 1971–72, 1985–86

== Records ==
- Highest League Position: 1st in Sussex County League Division One 1980–81, 1987–88, 1988–89
- FA Cup best performance: Second Qualifying Round 1981–82, 1985–86, 1987–88, 1988–89, 1990–91, 2026-27
- FA Vase best performance: Fourth Round 1980–81
- Highest Attendance: 1,200 vs Bognor Regis Town in 1971

== Former players ==
1. Players that have played/managed in the football league or any foreign equivalent to this level (i.e. fully professional league).
2. Players with full international caps.
- (England) Luca Coleman-Carr
