= Seaford Town F.C. =

Football club in East Sussex, England

Seaford Town
- Logo of Seaford Town Football Club
- Full name: Seaford Town Football Club
- Nickname: The Badgers
- Founded: 1932
- Ground: The Crouch, Seaford
- Coordinates: 50°46′18″N 0°6′28″E
- Manager: Ben Dartnall
- League: Southern Combination Premier Division
- 2025–26: Southern Combination Premier Division, 11th of 20
- Website: seafordtownfc.com
Home colours	Away colours

Seaford Town Football Club are a football club based in Seaford, East Sussex, England. They are currently members of the Southern Combination Premier Division and play at the Crouch.

== History ==
Seaford Town was first founded in 1932. The first competitive Seaford club, the Seaford Rovers FC. was founded in 1882 and won the Sussex Junior Cup in 1888. In 1910 Seaford FC won the Sussex Junior Cup. Like all other Sussex clubs they didn't play any games during the First World War, and part of their pitch was dug up to grow food.

After the Great War, Seaford FC played in the Mid Sussex League and won the Montgomery Cup in 1936 and 1939, but again the club had to stop playing games due to world war 2.

After the Second World War, they were among the founding members of the Sussex County League Division Two in 1952.

They won promotion to Division One in the 1963–64 season and were an ever-present in the top division until being relegated in 1971. During that period they achieved their highest ever league position – 4th place in 1965–66.

The club left the County League in 1978 but rejoined as of the founder members of the new Division Three in 1983. Seaford Town won Division Three in 1985–86 and followed up this success with winning the Division Two title in 1988–89 earning promotion back to the top flight. This spell in Division One only lasted two seasons before they were relegated back in 1991 after finishing 17th. Further relegations followed in 1992–93 and in 1996–97 which saw the club leaving the Sussex County League altogether.

After two seasons in the East Sussex League, they regained their County League status and also changed their name to just Seaford as opposed to 'Seaford Town' as they merged with the youth sides Seaford Seagulls which had teams ranging from under 7s all the way through to under 16s. This saw Seaford change from their traditional all red strip, to a red shirt with blue sleeves and blue shorts. Seaford was changed back to Seaford Town in 2005.

Seaford were promoted to Division Two in 2000–01 where they have been ever since, with 6th being their best finish achieved in 2004–05 and 2006–07 (adopting the "Town" suffix once more in 2005).

The club installed floodlights at their ground (which is known as 'The Crouch') for the 2007–08 season and won their first game under the floodlights with a 3–2 win against Lancing in the league.

The club have only competed in the FA Vase on two occasions – a Preliminary Round defeat at the hands of Cowes Sports in 1975–76, but after the erection of the floodlights, became eligible for the national competition from the 2008–09 season and were subsequently knocked out by Chichester City United in the preliminary round that season. After recent ground improvements the club has once again entered the competition.

The club is purely amateur and run by local volunteers. As well as First and Reserve Teams playing Senior level football, the club has a youth section for teams in the Under 8 to Under 18 age-groups, which play and compete in the Sussex Sunday Youth League. Sarah Scott was appointed Club Chair in January 2023, alongside Vice Chair Craig Pooley.

Seaford Town will play in their first ever FA Cup in 2025–26.

== Ground ==
Seaford Town play their home games at The Crouch Recreation Ground, Bramber Lane, Seaford.

== Honours ==
=== League honours ===
- Southern Combination Division 1
  - Winners: 2024-25
- Sussex County League Division Two
  - Winners: 1988–89
  - Runners Up: 1963–64
- Sussex County League Division Three
  - Winners: 1985–86
  - Runners Up: 2000–01
- Lewes League
  - Winners: 1907–08
- East Sussex League Premier
  - Winners: 1998–99

=== Cup honours ===
- The Sussex Royal Ulster Rifles Charity Cup
  - Runners Up: 1966–67, 1973–74
- Sussex County Football League Division Two Cup:
  - Winners: 2012–13
- Sussex County Football League Division Three Cup:
  - Winners: 1985–86
- Sussex Junior Cup
  - Winners: 1910
- Mid Sussex League Montgomery Cup
  - Winners: 1936, 1939

== Club records ==
- Highest league position:
  - 4th in Sussex County League Division one: 1965/66
- FA Cup best performance
  - First Qualifying Round: 2025/26 (Ongoing)
- FA Vase best performance
  - Second Round: 2019/20
- Highest attendance:
  - 931 vs Wick FC: 2023/24
