= 1991–92 Sussex County Football League =

The 1991–92 Sussex County Football League season was the 67th in the history of Sussex County Football League a football competition in England.

== Division One ==
Sussex County Football League Division One
- Season: 1991–92
- Champions: Peacehaven & Telscombe
- Relegated: Shoreham; Haywards Heath Town
- Matches: 306
- Goals: 1,070 (3.5 per match)

Division One featured 16 clubs which competed in the division last season, along with two new clubs, promoted from Division Two:

- Chichester City
- Newhaven

=== League table ===
Pos	Team	Pld	W	D	L	GF	GA	GD	Pts	Qualification or relegation
1	Peacehaven & Telscombe	34	29	4	1	115	24	+91	91	
2	Langney Sports	34	22	10	2	96	36	+60	76	
3	Littlehampton Town	34	23	7	4	95	42	+53	76	
4	Pagham	34	18	9	7	85	53	+32	63	
5	Wick	34	16	11	7	61	50	+11	59	
6	Burgess Hill Town	34	16	7	11	64	46	+18	55	
7	Three Bridges	34	14	11	9	66	51	+15	53	
8	Hailsham Town	34	14	8	12	73	63	+10	50	
9	Ringmer	34	13	7	14	57	60	−3	46	
10	Newhaven	34	13	6	15	63	73	−10	45	
11	Arundel	34	10	10	14	43	49	−6	40	
12	Eastbourne Town	34	12	4	18	33	63	−30	40	
13	Whitehawk	34	9	7	18	36	56	−20	34	
14	Oakwood	34	7	9	18	50	70	−20	30	
15	Chichester City	34	7	5	22	37	96	−59	26	
16	Bexhill Town	34	5	10	19	33	71	−38	25	
17	Shoreham	34	5	9	20	34	71	−37	24	Relegated to Division Two
18	Haywards Heath Town	34	2	8	24	29	96	−67	14	Relegated to Division Two

Source: nonleaguematters
Rules for classification: 1) points; 2) goal difference; 3) number of goals scored.

== Division Two ==
Sussex County Football League Division Two
- Season: 1991–92
- Champions: Portfield
- Promoted: Portfield; Midhurst & Easebourne
- Relegated: Bosham; East Preston
- Matches: 272
- Goals: 1,012 (3.72 per match)

Division Two featured 13 clubs which competed in the division last season, along with four new clubs.

- Clubs relegated from Division One:
  - Seaford Town
  - Selsey
- Clubs promoted from Division Three:
  - East Grinstead
  - East Preston

=== League table ===
Pos	Team	Pld	W	D	L	GF	GA	GD	Pts	Qualification or relegation
1	Portfield	32	22	8	2	73	27	+46	74	Promoted to Division One
2	Midhurst & Easebourne	32	21	3	8	88	53	+35	66	Promoted to Division One
3	Stamco	32	18	7	7	76	46	+30	61	
4	Redhill	32	18	6	8	70	40	+30	60	
5	Worthing United	32	18	5	9	73	49	+24	59	
6	Horsham YMCA	32	17	7	8	72	44	+28	58	
7	Selsey	32	16	5	11	63	48	+15	53	
8	Seaford Town	32	15	6	11	68	53	+15	51	
9	Crowborough Athletic	32	14	4	14	58	56	+2	46	
10	Sidley United	32	12	3	17	60	80	−20	39	
11	Broadbridge Heath	32	10	5	17	50	63	−13	35	
12	Little Common Albion	32	10	5	17	52	66	−14	35	
13	Saltdean United	32	9	4	19	40	68	−28	31	
14	East Grinstead	32	7	7	18	43	69	−26	28	
15	Lancing	32	7	6	19	46	58	−12	27	
16	Bosham	32	7	5	20	41	106	−65	26	Relegated to Division Three
17	East Preston	32	4	8	20	39	86	−47	20	Relegated to Division Three

Source: nonleaguematters
Rules for classification: 1) points; 2) goal difference; 3) number of goals scored.

== Division Three ==
Sussex County Football League Division Three
- Season: 1991–92
- Champions: Hassocks
- Promoted: Hassocks; Mile Oak
- Relegated: Rottingdean; Leftovers Sports Club
- Matches: 182
- Goals: 612 (3.36 per match)

Division Three featured eleven clubs which competed in the division last season, along with three new clubs:

- Franklands Village, relegated from Division Two
- Lindfield Rangers
- Sidlesham

=== League table ===
Pos	Team	Pld	W	D	L	GF	GA	GD	Pts	Qualification or relegation
1	Hassocks	26	22	1	3	72	14	+58	67	Promoted to Division Two
2	Mile Oak	26	17	6	3	61	25	+36	57	Promoted to Division Two
3	Sidlesham	26	13	8	5	48	36	+12	47	
4	Ifield	26	13	6	7	49	32	+17	45	
5	Withdean	26	12	6	8	50	40	+10	42	
6	Hurstpierpoint	26	10	6	10	45	48	−3	36	
7	Lindfield Rangers	26	10	4	12	48	50	−2	34	
8	Ferring	26	10	4	12	44	53	−9	34	
9	Storrington	26	9	6	11	36	40	−4	33	
10	Franklands Village	26	7	7	12	33	42	−9	28	
11	Buxted	26	7	5	14	43	64	−21	26	
12	Forest	26	5	7	14	31	45	−14	22	
13	Rottingdean	26	5	5	16	33	70	−37	20	Relegated from the league
14	Leftovers Sports Club	26	3	7	16	19	53	−34	16	Relegated from the league

Source: nonleaguematters
Rules for classification: 1) points; 2) goal difference; 3) number of goals scored.
