= 1981–82 Sussex County Football League =

The 1981–82 Sussex County Football League season was the 57th in the history of Sussex County Football League a football competition in England.

== Division One ==
Sussex County Football League Division One
- Season: 1981–82
- Champions: Peacehaven & Telscombe
- Relegated: Horsham YMCA; Shoreham
- Matches: 240
- Goals: 716 (2.98 per match)

Division One featured 14 clubs which competed in the division last season, along with two new clubs, promoted from Division Two:

- Hailsham Town
- Whitehawk

=== League table ===
Pos	Team	Pld	W	D	L	GF	GA	GR	Pts	Qualification or relegation
1	Peacehaven & Telscombe	30	22	6	2	66	20	3.300	48 (Note: Peacehaven & Telscombe were deducted two points.)	
2	Littlehampton Town	30	17	8	5	67	32	2.094	42	
3	Burgess Hill Town	30	14	10	6	58	48	1.208	38	
4	Steyning Town	30	16	5	9	65	37	1.757	37	
5	Pagham	30	13	9	8	49	36	1.361	35	
6	Three Bridges	30	13	9	8	40	38	1.053	35	
7	Arundel	30	10	11	9	40	36	1.111	31	
8	Hastings Town	30	11	6	13	39	40	0.975	28	
9	Chichester City	30	8	12	10	40	47	0.851	28	
10	Hailsham Town	30	8	11	11	45	58	0.776	27	
11	Ringmer	30	11	5	14	36	52	0.692	27	
12	Southwick	30	9	10	11	39	37	1.054	26 (Note: Southwick were deducted two points.)	
13	Eastbourne Town	30	11	3	16	38	43	0.884	25	
14	Whitehawk	30	7	8	15	38	54	0.704	22	
15	Horsham YMCA	30	3	10	17	19	50	0.380	16	Relegated to Division Two
16	Shoreham	30	2	7	21	37	88	0.420	11	Relegated to Division Two

Source: nonleaguematters
Rules for classification: 1) points; 2) goal ratio.

== Division Two ==
Sussex County Football League Division Two
- Season: 1981–82
- Champions: Wick
- Promoted: Wick; Midhurst & Easebourne
- Matches: 240
- Goals: 712 (2.97 per match)

Division Two featured twelve clubs which competed in the division last season, along with four new clubs:

- Bexhill Town, relegated from Division One
- Hassocks, joined from the Brighton, Hove & District League
- Midhurst & Easebourne, joined from the West Sussex League
- Portfield, relegated from Division One

=== League table ===
Pos	Team	Pld	W	D	L	GF	GA	GR	Pts	Qualification or relegation
1	Wick	30	25	3	2	94	15	6.267	53	Promoted to Division One
2	Midhurst & Easebourne	30	18	8	4	60	37	1.622	44	Promoted to Division One
3	Portfield	30	18	5	7	48	25	1.920	41	
4	Bexhill Town	30	17	6	7	46	32	1.438	40	
5	Sidley United	30	15	10	5	46	36	1.278	40	
6	Haywards Heath	30	10	13	7	47	32	1.469	33	
7	Rye United	30	12	8	10	41	37	1.108	32	
8	East Grinstead	30	9	12	9	41	34	1.206	30	
9	Lancing	30	11	6	13	54	44	1.227	28	
10	Newhaven	30	10	7	13	37	53	0.698	27	
11	Crowborough Athletic	30	11	4	15	32	44	0.727	26	
12	Hassocks	30	9	5	16	47	58	0.810	23	
13	Storrington	30	6	8	16	32	52	0.615	20	
14	Wigmore Athletic	30	6	7	17	33	60	0.550	19	
15	Selsey	30	7	0	23	33	71	0.465	14	
16	Albion United	30	2	6	22	21	82	0.256	10	

Source: nonleaguematters
Rules for classification: 1) points; 2) goal ratio.
