= 1995–96 Sussex County Football League =

The 1995–96 Sussex County Football League season was the 71st in the history of Sussex County Football League a football competition in England.

== Division One ==
Sussex County Football League Division One
- Season: 1995–96
- Champions: Peacehaven & Telscombe
- Promoted: Stamco
- Relegated: Crowborough Athletic
- Matches: 380
- Goals: 1,372 (3.61 per match)

Division One featured 17 clubs which competed in the division last season, along with three new clubs, promoted from Division Two:

- Hassocks
- Horsham YMCA
- Mile Oak

=== League table ===
Pos	Team	Pld	W	D	L	GF	GA	GD	Pts	Qualification or relegation
1	Peacehaven & Telscombe	38	32	5	1	133	23	+110	101	
2	Stamco	38	29	3	6	130	38	+92	90	Promoted to the Southern League Southern Division
3	Shoreham	38	25	8	5	91	37	+54	83	
4	Wick	38	23	6	9	95	52	+43	75	
5	Hailsham Town	38	21	10	7	84	48	+36	73	
6	Pagham	38	20	3	15	59	59	0	63	
7	Arundel	38	19	4	15	80	61	+19	61	
8	Hassocks	38	18	7	13	71	62	+9	61	
9	Langney Sports	38	17	9	12	70	52	+18	60	
10	Ringmer	38	16	6	16	70	59	+11	54	
11	Burgess Hill Town	38	14	10	14	66	66	0	52	
12	Horsham YMCA	38	15	7	16	56	75	−19	52	
13	Portfield	38	15	5	18	65	81	−16	50	
14	Eastbourne Town	38	12	4	22	51	89	−38	40	
15	Southwick	38	10	9	19	38	75	−37	39	
16	Whitehawk	38	10	6	22	49	71	−22	36	
17	Mile Oak	38	9	6	23	48	93	−45	33	
18	Three Bridges	38	6	6	26	46	101	−55	24	
19	Oakwood	38	5	2	31	30	113	−83	17	
20	Crowborough Athletic	38	4	4	30	40	117	−77	16	Relegated to Division Two

Source: nonleaguematters
Rules for classification: 1) points; 2) goal difference; 3) number of goals scored.

== Division Two ==
Sussex County Football League Division Two
- Season: 1995–96
- Champions: Saltdean United
- Promoted: Saltdean United; Selsey
- Matches: 306
- Goals: 1,153 (3.77 per match)

Division Two featured 13 clubs which competed in the division last season, along with five new clubs.

- Clubs relegated from Division One:
  - East Grinstead
  - Littlehampton Town
  - Newhaven
- Clubs promoted from Division Three:
  - East Preston
  - Midhurst & Easebourne

=== League table ===
Pos	Team	Pld	W	D	L	GF	GA	GD	Pts	Qualification or relegation
1	Saltdean United	34	25	6	3	87	40	+47	81	Promoted to Division One
2	Selsey	34	24	6	4	113	33	+80	78	Promoted to Division One
3	Chichester City	34	19	8	7	71	35	+36	65	
4	East Grinstead	34	19	8	7	76	53	+23	65	
5	Redhill	34	15	6	13	67	54	+13	51	
6	Newhaven	34	16	3	15	63	62	+1	51	
7	East Preston	34	13	10	11	63	55	+8	49	
8	Lancing	34	11	10	13	62	70	−8	43	
9	Worthing United	34	10	12	12	67	61	+6	42	
10	Steyning Town	34	11	9	14	61	76	−15	42	
11	Sidley United	34	10	10	14	45	56	−11	40	
12	Bexhill Town	34	11	6	17	65	59	+6	39	
13	Midhurst & Easebourne	34	11	6	17	55	69	−14	39	
14	Withdean	34	11	6	17	57	81	−24	39	
15	Littlehampton Town	34	8	14	12	48	58	−10	38	
16	Broadbridge Heath	34	10	7	17	55	82	−27	37	
17	Bosham	34	10	4	20	65	103	−38	34	
18	Eastbourne United	34	3	7	24	33	106	−73	16	

Source: nonleaguematters
Rules for classification: 1) points; 2) goal difference; 3) number of goals scored.

== Division Three ==
Sussex County Football League Division Three
- Season: 1995–96
- Champions: Ifield
- Promoted: Crawley Down Village
- Matches: 240
- Goals: 845 (3.52 per match)

Division Three featured twelve clubs which competed in the division last season, along with four new clubs:

- Crawley Down Village, joined from the Mid-Sussex League
- Lingfield, relegated from Division Two
- Storrington, relegated from Division Two
- Thomson Athletic

Also, Sunallon changed name to Sun Alliance.

=== League table ===
Pos	Team	Pld	W	D	L	GF	GA	GD	Pts	Qualification or relegation
1	Ifield	30	22	6	2	77	37	+40	72	
2	Crawley Down Village	30	22	3	5	83	32	+51	69	Promoted to Division Two
3	Shinewater Association	30	21	5	4	90	35	+55	68	
4	Sidlesham	30	18	6	6	73	34	+39	60	
5	Franklands Village	30	17	8	5	60	37	+23	59	
6	Lindfield Rangers	30	15	3	12	64	59	+5	48	Resigned from the league
7	Forest	30	11	10	9	43	42	+1	43	
8	Hurstpierpoint	30	12	5	13	48	55	−7	41	
9	Haywards Heath Town	30	9	8	13	37	50	−13	35	
10	Thomson Athletic	30	9	6	15	44	53	−9	33	
11	Buxted	30	9	5	16	38	57	−19	32	
12	Storrington	30	8	4	18	36	54	−18	28	
13	St Francis Hospital	30	8	1	21	37	74	−37	25	
14	Seaford Town	30	7	5	18	50	75	−25	26	
15	Sun Alliance	30	5	6	19	35	68	−33	21	
16	Lingfield	30	5	3	22	30	83	−53	18	

Source: nonleaguematters
Rules for classification: 1) points; 2) goal difference; 3) number of goals scored.
