= 1994–95 Sussex County Football League =

The 1994–95 Sussex County Football League season was the 70th in the history of Sussex County Football League a football competition in England.

== Division One ==
Sussex County Football League Division One
- Season: 1994–95
- Champions: Peacehaven & Telscombe
- Relegated: Newhaven; Littlehampton Town; East Grinstead
- Matches: 380
- Goals: 1,328 (3.49 per match)

Division One featured 18 clubs which competed in the division last season, along with two new clubs, promoted from Division Two:

- Shoreham
- Southwick

=== League table ===
Pos	Team	Pld	W	D	L	GF	GA	GD	Pts	Qualification or relegation
1	Peacehaven & Telscombe	38	29	2	7	134	38	+96	89	
2	Stamco	38	25	9	4	109	39	+70	84	
3	Wick	38	26	6	6	80	45	+35	84	
4	Shoreham	38	24	8	6	92	42	+50	80	
5	Hailsham Town	38	20	11	7	78	48	+30	71	
6	Ringmer	38	21	7	10	71	37	+34	70	
7	Pagham	38	21	4	13	84	62	+22	67	
8	Burgess Hill Town	38	17	7	14	60	48	+12	58	
9	Portfield	38	14	10	14	62	63	−1	52	
10	Whitehawk	38	14	9	15	51	54	−3	51	
11	Langney Sports	38	13	11	14	61	58	+3	50	
12	Three Bridges United	38	12	9	17	54	70	−16	45	
13	Eastbourne Town	38	10	10	18	50	79	−29	40	
14	Crowborough Athletic	38	11	7	20	59	94	−35	40	
15	Oakwood	38	10	10	18	56	93	−37	40	
16	Southwick	38	11	6	21	56	72	−16	39	
17	Arundel	38	8	10	20	45	67	−22	34	
18	Newhaven	38	7	6	25	42	103	−61	27	Relegated to Division Two
19	Littlehampton Town	38	5	11	22	47	102	−55	26	Relegated to Division Two
20	East Grinstead	38	2	7	29	37	114	−77	13	Relegated to Division Two

Source: nonleaguematters
Rules for classification: 1) points; 2) goal difference; 3) number of goals scored.

== Division Two ==
Sussex County Football League Division Two
- Season: 1994–95
- Champions: Mile Oak
- Promoted: Mile Oak; Hassocks; Horsham YMCA
- Relegated: Storrington; Lingfield
- Matches: 306
- Goals: 1,046 (3.42 per match)

Division Two featured 14 clubs which competed in the division last season, along with four new clubs.

- Clubs relegated from Division One:
  - Bexhill Town
  - Chichester City
- Clubs promoted from Division Three:
  - Bosham
  - Lingfield

=== League table ===
Pos	Team	Pld	W	D	L	GF	GA	GD	Pts	Qualification or relegation
1	Mile Oak	34	23	5	6	77	38	+39	74	Promoted to Division One
2	Hassocks	34	21	9	4	89	35	+54	72	Promoted to Division One
3	Horsham YMCA	34	21	7	6	73	31	+42	70	Promoted to Division One
4	Selsey	34	21	6	7	62	38	+24	69	
5	Redhill	34	18	3	13	70	45	+25	57	
6	Saltdean United	34	15	10	9	72	47	+25	55	
7	Bosham	34	15	7	12	71	57	+14	52	
8	Lancing	34	13	9	12	61	46	+15	48	
9	Broadbridge Heath	34	14	9	11	52	54	−2	51	
10	Sidley United	34	12	9	13	60	57	+3	45	
11	Withdean	34	13	5	16	57	66	−9	44	
12	Steyning Town	34	11	9	14	62	63	−1	42	
13	Worthing United	34	11	9	14	42	60	−18	42	
14	Bexhill Town	34	7	10	17	38	59	−21	31	
15	Chichester City	34	9	4	21	47	86	−39	31	
16	Eastbourne United	34	7	8	19	40	74	−34	29	
17	Storrington	34	6	5	23	31	79	−48	23	Relegated to Division Three
18	Lingfield	34	5	4	25	42	111	−69	19	Relegated to Division Three

Source: nonleaguematters
Rules for classification: 1) points; 2) goal difference; 3) number of goals scored.

== Division Three ==
Sussex County Football League Division Three
- Season: 1994–95
- Champions: Midhurst & Easebourne
- Promoted: Midhurst & Easebourne; East Preston
- Relegated: Little Common Albion; Edwards Sports
- Matches: 240
- Goals: 839 (3.5 per match)

Division Three featured 14 clubs which competed in the division last season, along with two new clubs, relegated from Division Two:

- Little Common Albion
- Midhurst & Easebourne

=== League table ===
Pos	Team	Pld	W	D	L	GF	GA	GD	Pts	Qualification or relegation
1	Midhurst & Easebourne	30	22	1	7	84	37	+47	67	Promoted to Division Two
2	East Preston	30	18	5	7	61	28	+33	59	Promoted to Division Two
3	Franklands Village	30	15	10	5	60	39	+21	55	
4	Lindfield Rangers	30	16	6	8	72	55	+17	54	
5	Seaford Town	30	16	3	11	56	54	+2	51	
6	Haywards Heath Town	30	14	3	13	44	57	−13	45	
7	Sidlesham	30	11	11	8	57	46	+11	44	
8	Forest	30	12	5	13	46	45	+1	41	
9	Hurstpierpoint	30	11	8	11	51	51	0	41	
10	Sunallon	30	11	8	11	40	47	−7	41	
11	Shinewater Association	30	12	2	16	44	59	−15	38	
12	Ifield	30	10	4	16	57	71	−14	34	
13	St Francis Hospital	30	9	4	17	54	66	−12	31	
14	Buxted	30	8	6	16	36	56	−20	30	
15	Little Common Albion	30	7	5	18	39	59	−20	26	Relegated to the East Sussex League
16	Edwards Sports	30	4	7	19	38	69	−31	19	Relegated from the league

Source: nonleaguematters
Rules for classification: 1) points; 2) goal difference; 3) number of goals scored.
