= 1992–93 Sussex County Football League =

The 1992–93 Sussex County Football League season was the 68th in the history of Sussex County Football League a football competition in England.

== Division One ==
Sussex County Football League Division One
- Season: 1992–93
- Champions: Peacehaven & Telscombe
- Relegated: Midhurst & Easebourne
- Matches: 306
- Goals: 1,010 (3.3 per match)

Division One featured 16 clubs which competed in the division last season, along with two new clubs, promoted from Division Two:

- Midhurst & Easebourne
- Portfield

=== League table ===
| Pos | Team | Pld | W | D | L | GF | GA | GD | Pts | Qualification or relegation |
|---|---|---|---|---|---|---|---|---|---|---|
| 1 | Peacehaven & Telscombe | 34 | 27 | 6 | 1 | 89 | 23 | +66 | 87 | |
| 2 | Pagham | 34 | 25 | 5 | 4 | 103 | 32 | +71 | 80 | |
| 3 | Wick | 34 | 25 | 3 | 6 | 81 | 35 | +46 | 78 | |
| 4 | Langney Sports | 34 | 20 | 5 | 9 | 77 | 42 | +35 | 65 | |
| 5 | Whitehawk | 34 | 18 | 9 | 7 | 55 | 32 | +23 | 63 | |
| 6 | Newhaven | 34 | 16 | 5 | 13 | 63 | 51 | +12 | 53 | |
| 7 | Littlehampton Town | 34 | 15 | 7 | 12 | 64 | 58 | +6 | 52 | |
| 8 | Oakwood | 34 | 14 | 9 | 11 | 55 | 52 | +3 | 51 | |
| 9 | Three Bridges | 34 | 14 | 6 | 14 | 50 | 50 | 0 | 48 | |
| 10 | Hailsham Town | 34 | 13 | 6 | 15 | 64 | 53 | +11 | 45 | |
| 11 | Bexhill Town | 34 | 10 | 6 | 18 | 43 | 61 | −18 | 36 | |
| 12 | Arundel | 34 | 10 | 6 | 18 | 42 | 75 | −33 | 36 | |
| 13 | Portfield | 34 | 8 | 10 | 16 | 39 | 60 | −21 | 34 | |
| 14 | Burgess Hill Town | 34 | 7 | 8 | 19 | 39 | 59 | −20 | 29 | |
| 15 | Ringmer | 34 | 8 | 5 | 21 | 44 | 73 | −29 | 29 | |
| 16 | Chichester City | 34 | 8 | 5 | 21 | 41 | 85 | −44 | 29 | |
| 17 | Eastbourne Town | 34 | 8 | 4 | 22 | 35 | 78 | −43 | 28 | |
| 18 | Midhurst & Easebourne | 34 | 5 | 5 | 24 | 26 | 91 | −65 | 20 | Relegated to Division Two |

Source: nonleaguematters
Rules for classification: 1) points; 2) goal difference; 3) number of goals scored.

== Division Two ==
Sussex County Football League Division Two
- Season: 1992–93
- Champions: Crowborough Athletic
- Promoted: Crowborough Athletic; Stamco; East Grinstead
- Relegated: Seaford Town; Haywards Heath Town
- Matches: 342
- Goals: 1,178 (3.44 per match)

Division Two featured 13 clubs which competed in the division last season, along with six new clubs.

- Clubs relegated from Division One:
  - Haywards Heath Town
  - Shoreham
- Clubs promoted from Division Three:
  - Hassocks
  - Mile Oak
- Clubs resigned from the Isthmian League:
  - Eastbourne United
  - Southwick

=== League table ===
| Pos | Team | Pld | W | D | L | GF | GA | GD | Pts | Qualification or relegation |
|---|---|---|---|---|---|---|---|---|---|---|
| 1 | Crowborough Athletic | 36 | 26 | 6 | 4 | 98 | 34 | +64 | 84 | Promoted to Division One |
| 2 | Stamco | 36 | 26 | 4 | 6 | 94 | 36 | +58 | 82 | Promoted to Division One |
| 3 | East Grinstead | 36 | 21 | 10 | 5 | 78 | 40 | +38 | 73 | Promoted to Division One |
| 4 | Lancing | 36 | 18 | 10 | 8 | 73 | 37 | +36 | 64 | |
| 5 | Worthing United | 36 | 19 | 6 | 11 | 70 | 60 | +10 | 63 | |
| 6 | Horsham YMCA | 36 | 18 | 8 | 10 | 71 | 46 | +25 | 62 | |
| 7 | Shoreham | 36 | 16 | 11 | 9 | 74 | 56 | +18 | 59 | |
| 8 | Hassocks | 36 | 16 | 7 | 13 | 61 | 49 | +12 | 55 | |
| 9 | Mile Oak | 36 | 14 | 10 | 12 | 69 | 65 | +4 | 52 | |
| 10 | Southwick | 36 | 14 | 10 | 12 | 59 | 56 | +3 | 52 | |
| 11 | Selsey | 36 | 12 | 3 | 21 | 55 | 65 | −10 | 39 | |
| 12 | Redhill | 36 | 10 | 9 | 17 | 55 | 71 | −16 | 39 | |
| 13 | Little Common Albion | 36 | 10 | 8 | 18 | 42 | 77 | −35 | 38 | |
| 14 | Sidley United | 36 | 9 | 8 | 19 | 57 | 80 | −23 | 35 | |
| 15 | Broadbridge Heath | 36 | 9 | 8 | 19 | 43 | 84 | −41 | 35 | |
| 16 | Eastbourne United | 36 | 9 | 6 | 21 | 48 | 76 | −28 | 33 | |
| 17 | Saltdean United | 36 | 9 | 6 | 21 | 44 | 76 | −32 | 33 | |
| 18 | Seaford Town | 36 | 8 | 5 | 23 | 38 | 79 | −41 | 29 | Relegated to Division Three |
| 19 | Haywards Heath Town | 36 | 7 | 7 | 22 | 49 | 91 | −42 | 28 | Relegated to Division Three |

Source: nonleaguematters
Rules for classification: 1) points; 2) goal difference; 3) number of goals scored.

== Division Three ==
Sussex County Football League Division Three
- Season: 1992–93
- Champions: Withdean
- Promoted: Withdean; Storrington
- Relegated: Ferring
- Matches: 182
- Goals: 662 (3.64 per match)

Division Three featured ten clubs which competed in the division last season, along with four new clubs:

- Bosham, relegated from Division Two
- East Preston, relegated from Division Two
- St Francis Hospital
- Shinewater Association, joined from the East Sussex League

=== League table ===
| Pos | Team | Pld | W | D | L | GF | GA | GD | Pts | Qualification or relegation |
|---|---|---|---|---|---|---|---|---|---|---|
| 1 | Withdean | 26 | 18 | 5 | 3 | 69 | 21 | +48 | 59 | Promoted to Division Two |
| 2 | Storrington | 26 | 16 | 4 | 6 | 62 | 27 | +35 | 52 | Promoted to Division Two |
| 3 | Bosham | 26 | 15 | 4 | 7 | 52 | 51 | +1 | 49 | |
| 4 | Sidlesham | 26 | 12 | 7 | 7 | 51 | 49 | +2 | 43 | |
| 5 | Forest | 26 | 11 | 8 | 7 | 51 | 40 | +11 | 41 | |
| 6 | Hurstpierpoint | 26 | 9 | 10 | 7 | 45 | 42 | +3 | 37 | |
| 7 | Ifield | 26 | 10 | 7 | 9 | 44 | 43 | +1 | 37 | |
| 8 | St Francis Hospital | 26 | 9 | 8 | 9 | 42 | 40 | +2 | 35 | |
| 9 | Lindfield Rangers | 26 | 9 | 6 | 11 | 38 | 43 | −5 | 33 | |
| 10 | Franklands Village | 26 | 7 | 6 | 13 | 22 | 45 | −23 | 27 | |
| 11 | Shinewater Association | 26 | 6 | 7 | 13 | 39 | 49 | −10 | 25 | |
| 12 | East Preston | 26 | 6 | 7 | 13 | 34 | 49 | −15 | 25 | |
| 13 | Buxted | 26 | 6 | 6 | 14 | 45 | 66 | −21 | 24 | |
| 14 | Ferring | 26 | 3 | 5 | 18 | 27 | 56 | −29 | 14 | Relegated from the league |

Source: nonleaguematters
Rules for classification: 1) points; 2) goal difference; 3) number of goals scored.
