= 1996–97 Sussex County Football League =

The 1996–97 Sussex County Football League season was the 72nd in the history of Sussex County Football League a football competition in England.

== Division One ==
Sussex County Football League Division One
- Season: 1996–97
- Champions: Burgess Hill Town
- Relegated: Three Bridges; Oakwood; Southwick
- Matches: 380
- Goals: 1,247 (3.28 per match)

Division One featured 18 clubs which competed in the division last season, along with two new clubs, promoted from Division Two:

- Saltdean United
- Selsey

=== League table ===
| Pos | Team | Pld | W | D | L | GF | GA | GD | Pts | Qualification or relegation |
|---|---|---|---|---|---|---|---|---|---|---|
| 1 | Burgess Hill Town | 38 | 28 | 4 | 6 | 105 | 46 | +59 | 88 | |
| 2 | Wick | 38 | 23 | 7 | 8 | 102 | 44 | +58 | 76 | |
| 3 | Peacehaven & Telscombe | 38 | 22 | 8 | 8 | 75 | 41 | +34 | 74 | |
| 4 | Saltdean United | 38 | 20 | 6 | 12 | 66 | 42 | +24 | 66 | |
| 5 | Ringmer | 38 | 19 | 5 | 14 | 62 | 53 | +9 | 62 | |
| 6 | Langney Sports | 38 | 16 | 10 | 12 | 72 | 56 | +16 | 58 | |
| 7 | Eastbourne Town | 38 | 17 | 6 | 15 | 59 | 51 | +8 | 57 | |
| 8 | Horsham YMCA | 38 | 14 | 9 | 15 | 58 | 53 | +5 | 51 | |
| 9 | Hassocks | 38 | 14 | 8 | 16 | 47 | 53 | −6 | 50 | |
| 10 | Pagham | 38 | 14 | 7 | 17 | 59 | 67 | −8 | 49 | |
| 11 | Shoreham | 38 | 14 | 6 | 18 | 62 | 66 | −4 | 48 | |
| 12 | Arundel | 38 | 12 | 11 | 15 | 66 | 78 | −12 | 47 | |
| 13 | Hailsham Town | 38 | 11 | 13 | 14 | 66 | 67 | −1 | 46 | |
| 14 | Portfield | 38 | 13 | 6 | 19 | 61 | 81 | −20 | 45 | |
| 15 | Selsey | 38 | 13 | 6 | 19 | 49 | 70 | −21 | 45 | |
| 16 | Mile Oak | 38 | 12 | 9 | 17 | 47 | 74 | −27 | 45 | |
| 17 | Whitehawk | 38 | 14 | 3 | 21 | 46 | 80 | −34 | 45 | |
| 18 | Three Bridges | 38 | 12 | 8 | 18 | 53 | 69 | −16 | 44 | Relegated to Division Two |
| 19 | Oakwood | 38 | 11 | 9 | 18 | 48 | 69 | −21 | 42 | Relegated to Division Two |
| 20 | Southwick | 38 | 7 | 7 | 24 | 44 | 87 | −43 | 28 | Relegated to Division Two |

Source: nonleaguematters
Rules for classification: 1) points; 2) goal difference; 3) number of goals scored.

== Division Two ==
Sussex County Football League Division Two
- Season: 1996–97
- Champions: Littlehampton Town
- Promoted: Littlehampton Town; Chichester City; Redhill
- Relegated: Bosham; Steyning Town
- Matches: 306
- Goals: 1,155 (3.77 per match)

Division Two featured 16 clubs which competed in the division last season, along with two new clubs:

- Crawley Down Village, promoted from Division Three
- Crowborough Athletic, relegated from Division One

=== League table ===
| Pos | Team | Pld | W | D | L | GF | GA | GD | Pts | Qualification or relegation |
|---|---|---|---|---|---|---|---|---|---|---|
| 1 | Littlehampton Town | 34 | 24 | 4 | 6 | 95 | 31 | +64 | 76 | Promoted to Division One |
| 2 | Chichester City | 34 | 22 | 3 | 9 | 69 | 35 | +34 | 69 | Promoted to Division One |
| 3 | Redhill | 34 | 20 | 7 | 7 | 88 | 42 | +46 | 67 | Promoted to Division One |
| 4 | Sidley United | 34 | 18 | 10 | 6 | 80 | 38 | +42 | 64 | |
| 5 | Eastbourne United | 34 | 18 | 9 | 7 | 75 | 43 | +32 | 63 | |
| 6 | East Preston | 34 | 18 | 5 | 11 | 79 | 48 | +31 | 59 | |
| 7 | Withdean | 34 | 17 | 8 | 9 | 70 | 46 | +24 | 59 | |
| 8 | Worthing United | 34 | 16 | 10 | 8 | 83 | 51 | +32 | 58 | |
| 9 | East Grinstead | 34 | 16 | 2 | 16 | 49 | 56 | −7 | 50 | |
| 10 | Crawley Down Village | 34 | 14 | 7 | 13 | 63 | 63 | 0 | 49 | |
| 11 | Bexhill Town | 34 | 14 | 5 | 15 | 65 | 72 | −7 | 47 | |
| 12 | Newhaven | 34 | 13 | 7 | 14 | 67 | 62 | +5 | 46 | |
| 13 | Midhurst & Easebourne | 34 | 10 | 6 | 18 | 57 | 91 | −34 | 36 | |
| 14 | Crowborough Athletic | 34 | 10 | 5 | 19 | 46 | 81 | −35 | 35 | |
| 15 | Lancing | 34 | 8 | 6 | 20 | 45 | 73 | −28 | 30 | |
| 16 | Broadbridge Heath | 34 | 8 | 3 | 23 | 46 | 98 | −52 | 27 | |
| 17 | Bosham | 34 | 6 | 2 | 26 | 46 | 107 | −61 | 20 | Relegated to Division Three |
| 18 | Steyning Town | 34 | 3 | 3 | 28 | 32 | 118 | −86 | 12 | Relegated to Division Three |

Source: nonleaguematters
Rules for classification: 1) points; 2) goal difference; 3) number of goals scored.

== Division Three ==
Sussex County Football League Division Three
- Season: 1996–97
- Champions: Sidlesham
- Promoted: Sidlesham; Shinewater Association
- Relegated: Seaford Town
- Matches: 240
- Goals: 835 (3.48 per match)

Division Three featured 14 clubs which competed in the division last season, along with two new clubs:

- Ansty Rangers
- Uckfield Town, joined from the Mid-Sussex League

=== League table ===
| Pos | Team | Pld | W | D | L | GF | GA | GD | Pts | Qualification or relegation |
|---|---|---|---|---|---|---|---|---|---|---|
| 1 | Sidlesham | 30 | 23 | 5 | 2 | 91 | 24 | +67 | 74 | Promoted to Division Two |
| 2 | Shinewater Association | 30 | 22 | 6 | 2 | 77 | 24 | +53 | 72 | Promoted to Division Two |
| 3 | Franklands Village | 30 | 17 | 6 | 7 | 69 | 43 | +26 | 57 | |
| 4 | Ansty Rangers | 30 | 12 | 11 | 7 | 55 | 47 | +8 | 47 | |
| 5 | Hurstpierpoint | 30 | 14 | 5 | 11 | 57 | 51 | +6 | 47 | |
| 6 | Lingfield | 30 | 13 | 7 | 10 | 57 | 37 | +20 | 46 | |
| 7 | Sun Alliance | 30 | 13 | 4 | 13 | 55 | 66 | −11 | 43 | |
| 8 | Buxted | 30 | 12 | 6 | 12 | 42 | 41 | +1 | 42 | |
| 9 | Storrington | 30 | 11 | 7 | 12 | 47 | 57 | −10 | 40 | |
| 10 | St Francis Hospital | 30 | 10 | 7 | 13 | 50 | 59 | −9 | 37 | |
| 11 | Uckfield Town | 30 | 11 | 4 | 15 | 55 | 65 | −10 | 37 | |
| 12 | Thomson Athletic | 30 | 9 | 7 | 14 | 46 | 58 | −12 | 34 | Resigned from the league |
| 13 | Ifield | 30 | 9 | 4 | 17 | 44 | 64 | −20 | 31 | |
| 14 | Forest | 30 | 6 | 8 | 16 | 31 | 54 | −23 | 26 | |
| 15 | Haywards Heath Town | 30 | 7 | 5 | 18 | 34 | 65 | −31 | 26 | |
| 16 | Seaford Town | 30 | 1 | 8 | 21 | 25 | 80 | −55 | 11 | Relegated to the East Sussex League |

Source: nonleaguematters
Rules for classification: 1) points; 2) goal difference; 3) number of goals scored.
