= Oxfordshire Senior Cup =

Senior county Cup of the Oxfordshire Football Association

- Organiser(s): Oxfordshire County FA
- Founded: 1884; 142 years ago
- Region: Oxfordshire
- Current champions: Kidlington
- Most championships: Oxford City (36 titles)

The Oxfordshire Senior Cup is the senior county cup of the Oxfordshire Football Association. The competition was first contested in the 1884–85 season.

Culham College won the inaugural tournament in 1985. Banbury Harriers were the first football club to win the cup in 1887.

The competition has been played every year with two exceptions, first during World War I, when football leagues and competition were suspended from 1914 to 1919. Second when competition was abandoned in 2020 at quarter-finals stage due to COVID-19 pandemic and was not held in the coming season of 2020–21.

== Recent finals ==
2012	North Leigh	5–0	Oxford City	Oxford
				Stadium: Kassam Stadium; Attendance: 525

2013	Oxford United	4–2 (a.e.t.)	Oxford City	Oxford
				Stadium: Kassam Stadium; Attendance: 901

2014	Ardley United	4–0	Kidlington	Oxford
				Stadium: Kassam Stadium; Attendance: 516

2015	Banbury United	4–4 (a.e.t.) (4–3 p)	North Leigh	Oxford
				Stadium: Kassam Stadium; Attendance: 400

2016	Oxford United	6–1	Oxford City	Oxford
				Stadium: Kassam Stadium

2017	North Leigh	2–1	Oxford United	Thame
				Stadium: ASM Stadium

2018	Oxford City	5–3	Kidlington	Thame
				Stadium: ASM Stadium

30 April 2019	Oxford City	4–3	Banbury United	Oxford
19:30 BST				Stadium: Court Place Farm; Referee: John Busby

2022	Oxford City	2–1	Oxford United	Oxford
				Stadium: Court Place Farm

18 April 2023	Oxford City	1–4	Thame United	Oxford
19:45 BST				Stadium: Court Place Farm; Referee: Neal Templey

2 May 2024	Kidlington	2–3	Thame United	Banbury
19:45 BST		Report		Stadium: Spencer Stadium; Attendance: 262; Referee: John Busby

3 May 2025	Ardley United	1–5	Thame United	Oxford
19:30 BST		Report		Stadium: Court Place Farm; Attendance: 350

2 May 2026	Kidlington	4–0	Oxford City	Thame
15:00 BST				Stadium: ASM Stadium

== Finals ==
=== List of winners ===
#	Season	Winner
1	1884–85	Culham College
2	1885–86	Culham College
3	1886–87	Oxford United College Servants
4	1887–87	Banbury Harriers
5	1888–89	Oxford United College Servants
6	1889–90	Amershan Hall School
7	1890–91	Banbury Harriers
8	1891–92	Oxford United College Servants
9	1892–93	Oxford United College Servants
10	1893–94	Oxford United College Servants
11	1894–95	Witney
12	1895–96	Oxford Cygnets
13	1896–97	Culham College
14	1897–98	Witney
15	1898–99	Witney
16	1899–1900	Oxford City
17	1900–01	Oxford City
18	1901–02	Culham College
19	1902–03	Culham College
20	1903–04	Henley
21	1904–05	Banbury Britannia Works & Volunteers United
22	1905–06	Thame
23	1906–07	Caversham Rovers
24	1907–08	Caversham Rovers
25	1908–09	Thame
26	1909–10	Thame
27	1910–11	Henley
28	1911–12	Oxford City
29	1912–13	Henley
30	1913–14	Henley
–	1914–1919	Competition suspended. World War I
31	1919–20	Banbury Britannia Works
32	1920–21	Morris Motors
33	1921–22	Cowley
34	1922–23	Cowley
35	1923–24	Cowley
36	1924–25	Cowley
37	1925–26	St Fridewide
38	1926–27	Cowley
39	1927–28	Banbury Stones Athletic
40	1928–29	Oxford City res.
41	1929–30	Bicester Town
42	1930–31	Oxford City res.
43	1931–32	RAF Heyford
44	1932–33	RAF Bicester

#	Season	Winner
45	1933–34	RAF Heyford
46	1934–35	Cowley
47	1935–36	Headington United
48	1936–37	Pressed Steel
49	1937–38	Pressed Steel
50	1938–39	Bicester Town
51	1939–40	Pressed Steel
52	1940–41	Infantry Training Centre
53	1941–42	Oxford City
54	1942–43	RAF Harwell
55	1943–44	Oxford City
56	1944–45	Oxford City
57	1945–46	Oxford City
58	1946–47	Henley Town
59	1947–48	Headington United
60	1948–49	Oxford City
61	1949–50	Pegasus
62	1950–51	Oxford City
63	1951–52	Headington United
64	1952–53	Witney Town
65	1953–54	Oxford City
66	1954–55	Witney Town
67	1955–56	Witney Town
68	1956–57	Oxford City
69	1957–58	Pegasus
70	1958–59	Witney Town
71	1959–60	Oxford City
72	1960–61	Oxford City
73	1961–62	Oxford City
74	1962–63	Oxford City
75	1963–64	Morris Motors
76	1964–65	Oxford City
77	1965–66	Quarry Nomads
78	1966–67	Oxford City
79	1967–68	Oxford City
80	1968–69	Oxford City
81	1969–70	Oxford City
82	1970–71	Oxford City; Witney Town
83	1971–72	Oxford City
84	1972–73	Witney Town
85	1973–74	Oxford City
86	1974–75	Pressed Steel
87	1975–76	Thame United
88	1976–77	Chipping Norton Town

#	Season	Winner
89	1977–78	Chipping Norton Town
90	1978–79	Banbury United
91	1979–80	Peppard
92	1980–81	Thame United
93	1981–82	Peppard
94	1982–83	Oxford City
95	1983–84	Oxford City
96	1984–85	Morris Motors
97	1985–86	Oxford City
98	1986–87	Oxford United
99	1987–88	Banbury United
100	1988–89	Oxford United
101	1989–90	Oxford United
102	1990–91	Oxford United
103	1991–92	Oxford United
104	1992–93	Thame United
105	1993–94	Witney Town
106	1994–95	Witney Town
107	1995–96	Oxford City
108	1996–97	Oxford City
109	1997–98	Witney Town
110	1998–99	Oxford City
111	1999–2000	Oxford City
112	2000–01	Thame United
113	2001–02	Thame United
114	2002–03	Oxford City
115	2003–04	Banbury United
116	2004–05	Oxford United
117	2005–06	Banbury United
118	2006–07	Banbury United
119	2007–08	North Leigh
120	2008–09	Oxford United
121	2009–10	Oxford United
122	2010–11	Oxford United
123	2011–12	North Leigh
124	2012–13	Oxford United
125	2013–14	Ardley United
126	2014–15	Banbury United
127	2015–16	Oxford United
128	2016–17	North Leigh
129	2017–18	Oxford City
130	2018–19	Oxford City
131	2019–20	Competition suspended. COVID-19 pandemic
–	2020–21	No competition. COVID-19 pandemic
132	2021–22	Oxford City
133	2022–23	Thame United
134	2023–24	Thame United
135	2024–25	Thame United
136	2025–26	Kidlington

=== Wins by teams ===
Club	Winners	Last win	Notes
Oxford City	36	2021–22	Won 2 titles as Oxford City reserves. Including 1 shared with Witney Town.
Oxford United	14	2015–16	Won 3 titles as Headington United.
Witney Town	12	1997–98	Won 3 titles as Witney. Including 1 shared with Oxford City.
Thame United	11	2024–25	Won 3 titles as Thame.
Cowley †	9	1984–85	Won 3 titles as Morris Motors. Dissolved in 1993.
Banbury United	6	2014–15	
Culham College †	5	1902–03	Dissolved in 1970s.
Oxford United College Servants †	5	1893–94	Dissolved in mid-20th century.
Henley Town	5	1946–47	Won 4 titles as Henley.
Pressed Steel †	4	1974–75	Dissolved in 1980s.
North Leigh	3	2016–17	
Banbury Britannia Works †	2	1919–20	Won 1 title as Banbury Britannia Works & Volunteers United. Dissolved in 1960s.
Banbury Harriers †	2	1890–91	Dissolved in 1920s.
Bicester Town	2	1938–39	
Caversham Rovers †	2	1907–08	Dissolved in 1970.
Chipping Norton Town	2	1977–78	
Pegasus †	2	1957–58	Dissolved in 1963.
Peppard †	2	1981–82	Dissolved in 2004.
RAF Heyford †	2	1933–34	Dissolved in 1994.
Ardley United	1	2013–14	
Amershan Hall School †	1	1889–90	Dissolved in 1966.
Banbury Stones Athletic †	1	1927–28	Dissolved in 1964.
Infantry Training Centre †	1	1940–41	Dissolved in 2004.
Kidlington	1	2025–26	
Oxford Cygnets †	1	1895–96	Dissolved in 1924.
Quarry Nomads †	1	1965–66	Dissolved in 2018.
RAF Bicester †	1	1932–33	Dissolved in 2004.
RAF Harwell †	1	1942–43	Dissolved in 1992.
St Fridewide †	1	1925–26	Dissolved in 1948.
