= 1992–93 Combined Counties Football League =

The 1992–93 Combined Counties Football League season was the 15th in the history of the Combined Counties Football League, a football competition in England.

The league was won by newcomers Peppard for the first time.

== League table ==
Combined Counties Football League
- Season: 1992–93
- Champions: Peppard
- Matches: 342
- Goals: 1,103 (3.23 per match)

The league remained at 19 clubs after Farnham Town were promoted to the Isthmian League and Malden Town resigned. Two new clubs joined:

- D.C.A. Basingstoke, joining from the Hampshire League.
- Peppard, joining from the Chiltonian League.
- Godalming Town changed their name to Godalming & Guildford.

Pos	Team	Pld	W	D	L	GF	GA	GD	Pts	Promotion or relegation
1	Peppard	36	27	3	6	111	39	+72	85 (Note: Peppard and D.C.A. Basingstoke each had a point awarded)	
2	Chipstead	36	19	10	7	78	47	+31	67	
3	Ashford Town	36	18	13	5	67	36	+31	67	
4	Merstham	36	16	11	9	67	66	+1	59	
5	Viking Sports	36	15	10	11	67	56	+11	55	
6	Ash United	36	15	10	11	49	48	+1	55	
7	Sandhurst Town	36	14	11	11	48	52	−4	53	
8	Hartley Wintney	36	14	10	12	60	47	+13	52	
9	Godalming & Guildford	36	14	8	14	51	61	−10	49 (Note: Godalming & Guildford and Horley Town each had a point deducted)	
10	Cranleigh	36	12	11	13	66	59	+7	47	
11	Steyning Town	36	12	8	16	55	69	−14	44	Joined the Sussex County League
12	Bedfont	36	10	13	13	51	46	+5	43	
13	D.C.A. Basingstoke	36	11	8	17	50	67	−17	42	
14	Horley Town	36	10	12	14	60	73	−13	41	
15	Frimley Green	36	11	7	18	43	55	−12	40	
16	Farleigh Rovers	36	11	5	20	46	65	−19	38	
17	Cobham	36	9	10	17	54	78	−24	37	
18	Ditton	36	9	9	18	48	71	−23	36	
19	Westfield	36	6	9	21	32	68	−36	27	

Source: fchd nonleaguematters
Rules for classification: 1) points; 2) goal difference; 3) number of goals scored.
