= 1993–94 Sussex County Football League =

The 1993–94 Sussex County Football League season was the 69th in the history of Sussex County Football League a football competition in England.

== Division One ==
Sussex County Football League Division One
- Season: 1993–94
- Champions: Wick
- Relegated: Bexhill Town; Chichester City
- Matches: 380
- Goals: 1,320 (3.47 per match)

Division One featured 17 clubs which competed in the division last season, along with three new clubs, promoted from Division Two:

- Crowborough Athletic
- East Grinstead
- Stamco

=== League table ===
Pos	Team	Pld	W	D	L	GF	GA	GD	Pts	Qualification or relegation
1	Wick	38	31	4	3	111	30	+81	97	
2	Whitehawk	38	25	6	7	74	43	+31	81	
3	Langney Sports	38	22	7	9	84	59	+25	73	
4	Peacehaven & Telscombe	38	16	15	7	71	37	+34	63	
5	Pagham	38	18	9	11	77	51	+26	63	
6	Hailsham Town	38	18	8	12	72	61	+11	62	
7	Burgess Hill Town	38	17	9	12	75	55	+20	60	
8	Newhaven	38	17	9	12	79	67	+12	60	
9	Stamco	38	16	7	15	77	59	+18	55	
10	Arundel	38	15	9	14	66	57	+9	54	
11	Oakwood	38	14	7	17	56	64	−8	49	
12	Three Bridges	38	12	9	17	68	84	−16	45	
13	Littlehampton Town	38	11	11	16	58	62	−4	44	
14	Portfield	38	12	7	19	60	90	−30	43	
15	East Grinstead	38	10	13	15	39	69	−30	43	
16	Crowborough Athletic	38	10	7	21	62	88	−26	37	
17	Eastbourne Town	38	10	7	21	41	73	−32	37	
18	Ringmer	38	11	3	24	50	93	−43	36	
19	Bexhill Town	38	9	6	23	53	82	−29	33	Relegated to Division Two
20	Chichester City	38	5	9	24	47	96	−49	24	Relegated to Division Two

Source: nonleaguematters
Rules for classification: 1) points; 2) goal difference; 3) number of goals scored.

== Division Two ==
Sussex County Football League Division Two
- Season: 1993–94
- Champions: Shoreham
- Promoted: Shoreham; Southwick
- Relegated: Midhurst & Easebourne; Little Common Albion
- Matches: 306
- Goals: 1,070 (3.5 per match)

Division Two featured 14 clubs which competed in the division last season, along with four new clubs:

- Midhurst & Easebourne, relegated from Division One
- Steyning Town, joined from the Combined Counties League
- Storrington, promoted from Division Three
- Withdean, promoted from Division Three

=== League table ===
Pos	Team	Pld	W	D	L	GF	GA	GD	Pts	Qualification or relegation
1	Shoreham	34	25	4	5	68	28	+40	79	Promoted to Division One
2	Southwick	34	22	8	4	74	26	+48	74	Promoted to Division One
3	Hassocks	34	20	6	8	78	38	+40	66	
4	Redhill	34	20	5	9	89	51	+38	65	
5	Lancing	34	18	9	7	63	37	+26	63	
6	Horsham YMCA	34	17	7	10	65	43	+22	58	
7	Selsey	34	15	9	10	66	51	+15	54	
8	Mile Oak	34	14	6	14	70	63	+7	48	
9	Sidley United	34	14	6	14	72	77	−5	48	
10	Worthing United	34	13	7	14	55	59	−4	46	
11	Eastbourne United	34	12	8	14	58	64	−6	44	
12	Saltdean United	34	13	5	16	55	67	−12	44	
13	Withdean	34	11	5	18	50	72	−22	38	
14	Steyning Town	34	8	5	21	47	84	−37	29	
15	Broadbridge Heath	34	7	7	20	45	70	−25	28	
16	Storrington	34	6	8	20	46	72	−26	26	
17	Midhurst & Easebourne	34	8	2	24	40	94	−54	26	Relegated to Division Three
18	Little Common Albion	34	6	7	21	29	74	−45	25	Relegated to Division Three

Source: nonleaguematters
Rules for classification: 1) points; 2) goal difference; 3) number of goals scored.

== Division Three ==
Sussex County Football League Division Three
- Season: 1993–94
- Champions: Bosham
- Promoted: Bosham; Lingfield
- Matches: 240
- Goals: 808 (3.37 per match)

Division Three featured eleven clubs which competed in the division last season, along with five new clubs:

- Edwards Sports
- Haywards Heath Town, relegated from Division Two
- Lingfield, joined from the Mid-Sussex League
- Seaford Town, relegated from Division Two
- Sunallon

=== League table ===
Pos	Team	Pld	W	D	L	GF	GA	GD	Pts	Qualification or relegation
1	Bosham	30	19	5	6	69	33	+36	62	Promoted to Division Two
2	Lingfield	30	18	5	7	62	43	+19	59	Promoted to Division Two
3	East Preston	30	14	6	10	60	46	+14	48	
4	Ifield	30	13	8	9	68	48	+20	47	
5	Sunallon	30	12	8	10	58	48	+10	44	
6	Seaford Town	30	13	4	13	36	37	−1	43	
7	Hurstpierpoint	30	12	6	12	55	51	+4	42	
8	Forest	30	12	6	12	51	62	−11	42	
9	St Francis Hospital	30	10	7	13	40	44	−4	37	
10	Buxted	30	10	6	14	51	67	−16	36	
11	Sidlesham	30	9	9	12	49	66	−17	36	
12	Lindfield Rangers	30	9	8	13	45	43	+2	35	
13	Haywards Heath Town	30	10	5	15	39	54	−15	35	
14	Edwards Sports	30	7	13	10	46	60	−14	34	
15	Shinewater Association	30	9	6	15	39	53	−14	33	
16	Franklands Village	30	7	10	13	40	53	−13	31	

Source: nonleaguematters
Rules for classification: 1) points; 2) goal difference; 3) number of goals scored.
