= 1982–83 Sussex County Football League =

The 1982–83 Sussex County Football League season was the 58th in the history of Sussex County Football League a football competition in England. It also was the last season for the league to consist of two divisions.

== Division One ==
Sussex County Football League Division One
- Season: 1982–83
- Champions: Peacehaven & Telscombe
- Relegated: Arundel; Chichester City
- Matches: 240
- Goals: 777 (3.24 per match)

Division One featured 14 clubs which competed in the division last season, along with two new clubs, promoted from Division Two:

- Midhurst & Easebourne
- Wick

=== League table ===
Pos	Team	Pld	W	D	L	GF	GA	GR	Pts	Qualification or relegation
1	Peacehaven & Telscombe	30	22	6	2	61	19	3.211	50	
2	Southwick	30	17	9	4	67	32	2.094	43	
3	Hastings Town	30	18	6	6	86	39	2.205	42	
4	Steyning Town	30	18	5	7	52	29	1.793	41	
5	Whitehawk	30	15	9	6	49	30	1.633	39	
6	Littlehampton Town	30	13	10	7	59	47	1.255	36	
7	Wick	30	12	6	12	63	52	1.212	30	
8	Three Bridges	30	11	8	11	33	33	1.000	30	
9	Eastbourne Town	30	9	10	11	36	51	0.706	28	
10	Hailsham Town	30	11	5	14	55	58	0.948	27	
11	Burgess Hill Town	30	9	6	15	42	50	0.840	24	
12	Pagham	30	8	7	15	46	61	0.754	23	
13	Ringmer	30	8	6	16	32	42	0.762	22	
14	Midhurst & Easebourne	30	5	11	14	42	68	0.618	21	
15	Arundel	30	6	4	20	32	68	0.471	16	Relegated to Division Two
16	Chichester City	30	3	2	25	22	98	0.224	8	Relegated to Division Two

Source: nonleaguematters
Rules for classification: 1) points; 2) goal ratio.

== Division Two ==
Sussex County Football League Division Two
- Season: 1982–83
- Champions: Horsham YMCA
- Promoted: Horsham YMCA; Lancing
- Matches: 240
- Goals: 812 (3.38 per match)

Division Two featured 14 clubs which competed in the division last season, along with two new clubs, relegated from Division One:

- Horsham YMCA
- Shoreham

=== League table ===
Pos	Team	Pld	W	D	L	GF	GA	GR	Pts	Qualification or relegation
1	Horsham YMCA	30	21	6	3	74	30	2.467	48	Promoted to Division One
2	Lancing	30	20	6	4	57	26	2.192	46	Promoted to Division One
3	Haywards Heath	30	18	2	10	70	40	1.750	38	
4	Hassocks	30	16	6	8	69	54	1.278	38	
5	East Grinstead	30	15	7	8	46	30	1.533	37	
6	Bexhill Town	30	15	7	8	56	41	1.366	37	
7	Portfield	30	15	6	9	70	45	1.556	36	
8	Rye United	30	14	4	12	49	45	1.089	32	Transferred to the Kent County League
9	Shoreham	30	13	5	12	54	49	1.102	31	
10	Selsey	30	11	6	13	43	53	0.811	28	
11	Wigmore Athletic	30	8	6	16	41	57	0.719	22	
12	Sidley United	30	7	5	18	43	59	0.729	19	
13	Albion United	30	6	7	17	37	67	0.552	19	
14	Newhaven	30	5	7	18	30	65	0.462	17	
15	Crowborough Athletic	30	8	1	21	37	81	0.457	17	
16	Storrington	30	6	3	21	36	70	0.514	15	

Source: nonleaguematters
Rules for classification: 1) points; 2) goal ratio.
