= Gavin Geddes =

English footballer

Personal information
- Full name: Gavin John Geddes
- Date of birth: 7 October 1972 (age 54)
- Place of birth: Hove, England
- Height: 5 ft 10 in (1.78 m)
- Position: Winger

Youth career
- Hove Park Colts
- Adur Athletic
- Saltdean Tigers

Senior career*
Years	Team	Apps	(Gls)
- Lewes
- Shoreham
199?–1993	Wick		
1993–1994	Brighton & Hove Albion	12	(1)
1994–1997	Crawley Town	72	(14)
199?-1999	Burgess Hill Town		
1999-2001	Horsham		
2001	Worthing		
2001	Eastbourne Borough		
2001-2002	Worthing		
2002-2003	Horsham		
2003-2004	Worthing		
2004-2005	Horsham		
2005	Whitehawk	4	(1)
2005-2007	Worthing United		
2008	Horsham		
2008	Worthing United		
- Saltdean United
- Sutton United
- Ashford Town (Middlesex)
2009	Burgess Hill Town		
2009-2010	Horsham YMCA	22	(4)
- * Club domestic league appearances and goals

Gavin John Geddes (born 7 October 1972) is an English former professional footballer who played as a winger in the Football League for Brighton & Hove Albion.

== Early professional career ==
The Brighton Argus hailed his fairy tail rise from Lewes reserves in 1991 to the Albion first team just two years later. Geddes was signed on 1 July 1993 by manager Barry Lloyd for Brighton & Hove Albion after appearing at the Goldstone Ground in a Sussex Senior Cup win for Wick. Under new manager Liam Brady he left the club exactly a year later after 15 league and cup appearances. He scored twice, once against Reading in the FL Trophy and also against Wrexham in the league.

== Career in non-league football ==
Geddes also played non-league football for a variety of clubs, mainly in Sussex. He totalled 75 goals in 135 league and cup games for Horsham across four spells, 43 goals in 73 league and cup games for Burgess Hill Town in two spells and 16 goals in 84 appearances for Crawley Town.

In September 1998 and February 1999 he was playing for Burgess Hill Town, including appearing in the semi-final of the Sussex Senior Cup.

In January 2000, while playing for Horsham Geddes scored for a Sussex representative side against the Navy.

In February 2001 he scored a hat trick in a 4-0 win for Horsham in Ryman League Division 2 amid speculation it could be his last game for the club, with a move to Lewes rumoured.

In August 2001, Geddes signed for Worthing. In December 2001 he re-joined Worthing after a two week spell at Eastbourne Borough, being re-signed by new caretaker manager Barry Lloyd, who had earlier brought him to the Albion. At the time he was the second highest goal scorer in Ryman League South. In March 2002 he was still playing for Worthing, despite being told by the manager he could speak to other clubs.

In September 2002 he had returned to Horsham, scoring against his former club in a West Sussex derby. In February 2003 while playing for Horsham in a game against Tooting & Mitcham United, he was involved in an altercation with visiting fans after scoring a disputed goal. In September and December 2003 he was back playing at Worthing.

In August 2004 Geddes re-signed for Horsham from Worthing.

Geddes began the 2005-2006 season at Whitehawk, playing in the number 9 shirt for his old Albion colleague Ian Chapman and scoring in his first two games. After making just five league and cup appearances, he moved to Worthing United.

In October 2006 he was involved in a scoring FA Cup run while playing for Sussex County League side Worthing United, who reached the third qualifying round with a game against Maidenhead United. The Brighton Argus listed his former clubs as Lewes, Shoreham, Wick, Crawley Town, Worthing, Saltdean United and Horsham.

Geddes finished the 2007 season with 23 goals in 29 games for Worthing United.

He re-signed for Worthing United in November 2008, after playing his last game for Horsham against Tonbridge Angels on 4 October.

In March 2009 Geddes was back playing at Burgess Hill Town and was sent off at home to Kingstonian the following month.

In October 2009 he joined Horsham YMCA from Burgess Hill Town and in December scored a hat-trick after coming off the bench in a 9-0 win over Eastbourne Town in Ryman Division 1.

== Personal life ==
Geddes was jailed in February 2019 at Lewes Crown Court for 40 months over allegations of child sex abuse and demands for money he had made to a former football coach, then 87 years-of-age.

In May 2019 Geddes complained to the Independent Press Standards Association over coverage of his case by the Brighton Argus. The adjudication, published in January 2020, did not uphold the complaint.

At the time of being arrested in 2017, Geddes was working as a delivery driver.

While in prison, Geddes wrote a screenplay 'An Evening with Neville Heath' and subsequently an autobiography 'Soundtrack to a Life: The Gavin Geddes Story' which he is hoping to have published.
