= Nic Taylor =

English-Montserratian footballer

Nick Taylor
Personal information
- Full name: Nicholas Taylor Mills Greaves
- Date of birth: 6 April 1991 (age 35)
- Place of birth: London, England
- Height: 1.88 m (6 ft 2 in)
- Position: Goalkeeper

Team information
- Current team: Croydon

Youth career
- ?–2008: Millwall
- 2008: Crystal Palace

Senior career*
Years	Team	Apps	(Gls)
2008	Woking	1	(0)
2009–2010	Dagenham & Redbridge	0	(0)
2010	→ Hemel Hempstead Town (loan)	6	(0)
2010	→ Kingstonian (loan)	1	(0)
2010–2011	Kingstonian	5	(0)
2011	→ Fisher (loan)	5	(0)
2012	Sutton United	12	(0)
2011–2012	Epsom & Ewell	14	(0)
2012–2013	Tooting & Mitcham United	18	(0)
2013–2014	Chipstead	8	(0)
2014	Cray Wanderers	17	(0)
2014–2015	Shoreham	36	(2)
2015	→ Tunbridge Wells (dual registration)	6	(0)
2015–2016	Redhill	9	(0)
2015	East Grinstead Town	20	(0)
2016	Guildford City	14	(0)
2016	East Grinstead Town	2	(0)
2016	Ashford United	5	(0)
2016–2018	Fisher	64	(0)
2018–2019	AFC Croydon Athletic	24	(0)
2019	Punjab United	0	(0)
2019–2020	AFC Croydon Athletic	26	(0)
2020–2021	Erith Town	9	(0)
2021–2022	Croydon	23	(0)

International career^{‡}
2014–2021	Montserrat	3	(0)
- * Club domestic league appearances and goals as of 09:00, 24 May 2015 (UTC) ‡ National team caps and goals as of 05:57, 3 June 2021 (UTC)

Nicholas Taylor Mills Greaves (born 20 August 1991) is an English-Montserratian footballer who plays as a goalkeeper. Taylor works as a sports coach in a primary school in Clapham, London.

== Career ==
=== Professional career ===
Taylor began his career progressing through the ranks for the Millwall Academy, before joining Crystal Palace in 2008. After a year in the youth set-up at Selhurst Park, he joined Woking. Signing his first professional contract later that year, he continued to spend the season with the youth side before his departure to Dagenham & Redbridge. Signing on professional terms, Taylor was also unable to break into the first team at the League Two club.

=== Non-League career ===
Struggling to become a regular in the senior side, Taylor joined Southern League Premier Division side Hemel Hempstead Town on loan – making sporadic appearances for the first team while lining-up for the Reserves. Upon his return to the Daggers, he joined Isthmian Premier Division side Kingstonian on loan. The deal was later made permanent, but the goalkeeper only managed a single senior appearance, keeping a clean sheet in a 3–0 win at Walton & Hersham in the Isthmian League Cup second round.

While registered with Kingstonian, Taylor joined Fisher on loan in October 2011 to gain first team football, before departing Kingsmeadow to join Epsom & Ewell. Finally cementing his place in a senior side, he remained with the Salts until the conclusion of the 2011–12 season.

Following a short stint with Sutton United, featuring in the reserves once more, Taylor joined Isthmian Division One South side Tooting & Mitcham United and returned to senior football. Departing at the end of the season, he joined Chipstead for six months before impressing Isthmian Premier Division side Cray Wanderers and being rewarded with his international debut.

Taylor joined Sussex County League side Shoreham ahead of the 2015–16 season and earned another international call-up. Following this he dual-registered with Tunbridge Wells. Taylor joined Combined Counties outfit Redhill in August 2015. Taylor was released by Tunbridge Wells in October 2015, due to costs.

Following this, Taylor joined East Grinstead Town in November 2015, before a lack of first team appearances prompted another move. February 2016 saw him join Guildford City, where he was bought in to replace the injured Luke Badiali for the remainder of the season. Taylor was sent off following a red card in his first game with Guildford City. Taylor made 10 appearances for City as they finished the season in 14th place.

Despite being penalised for unexpectedly pushing another player in East Grinstead's final game of the season against Walton & Hersham in April 2016 and their signing of a new, more experienced goalkeeper Milan Stojsavljevic, Taylor signed for East Grinstead Town for the start of the 2016–17 season. Following a short period with Ashford United, Taylor signed for Fisher in December 2016 as one of returning manager Dean Harrison's key signings to help strengthen the club's defence. He won Manager's Player of the Year at the end of the season.

After a spell at AFC Croydon Athletic in 2018, Taylor joined Punjab United in January 2019.

Taylor re-joined AFC Croydon Athletic in the summer of 2019 and was their first-choice goalkeeper. He then joined Erith Town for the 2020–21 season, then Croydon in June 2021.

=== International career ===
Taylor made his international debut for Montserrat on 30 March 2014, featuring in a 1–0 win over the US Virgin Islands in the 2014 Gold Cup. His second international cap came during a 0–0 draw with Bonaire on 3 June 2014. Taylor was named on the bench in two fixtures against Curaçao in 2018 World Cup qualification a year later, but did not feature.
