= Peppard F.C. =

English football club

Peppard F.C. was a football team based in Rotherfield Peppard, Oxfordshire.

Founded as Sonning Common Peppard F.C., they changed their name to Peppard F.C. in 1990, and after winning the Chiltonian League two years running (in 1990–91 and 1991–92) they were promoted to the Combined Counties Football League. They won the Combined Counties Football League two years in succession (in 1992–93 and 1993–94) but left to rejoin the Chiltonian League in 1996–97.

They were league runners-up in 1998–99, and after the Chiltonian League merged to form the Hellenic Football League, Peppard were placed in Division One East. Success then was harder to come by, and by 2002 the club's future was in grave danger and they had quit the Hellenic Football League at the end of the 2002–03 season.

The club had tried to improve its facilities for many years; in 1994 their basic railed-off pitch had denied them the chance of promotion to the Isthmian League Premier Division. A consortium of local businessmen did try to keep the club alive, but after playing at Palmer Park (which was too small a pitch for FA Competitions) it was decided that the club had no future and what backing they had soon left. Therefore, by 2004, the club had ceased to exist.

The club briefly played in the FA Vase in the mid-1990s:

1993–94 Reached 1st Qualifying Round and beat Oxford City F.C. 1–0. However, the tie was awarded to Oxford City, as Peppard's home pitch was too small.

1994–95 Knocked out in the Extra Preliminary Qualifying Round 1–2 to Flight Refuelling F.C -(now known as Merley Cobham Sports F.C.).

1995–96 Knocked out in the 1st Qualifying Round 2–3 to Cranleigh F.C.

Peppard F.C also entered a team in the FA Sunday Cup for one season in 1998–99, which has since merged with Theale F.C.

Their biggest win was a 7–1 home win against Ashford Town F.C. on Monday 30 May 1994.
