= Midhurst & Easebourne F.C. =

Association football club in England

Coordinates: 50°59′39.16″N 0°44′03.37″W

Midhurst & Easebourne
- Full name: Midhurst & Easebourne Football Club
- Nickname: The Stags
- Founded: 1946
- Ground: The Rotherfield, Midhurst
- Chairman: Tom Merritt-Smith
- Manager: Ash Clarke
- League: Southern Combination Premier Division
- 2025–26: Southern Combination Premier Division, 15th of 20
- Website: midhurstfc.com
Home colours	Away colours

Midhurst & Easebourne Football Club is a football club based in Midhurst, West Sussex, England. They are currently members of the Southern Combination Premier Division and play at the Rotherfield.

== History ==
The club was established in 1946 by a merger of Midhurst, whose ground had been used to build a school on, and Easebourne, who had lost several officials and players during the World War II. They joined the West Sussex League and went on to win the league in 1955–56, 1962–63 and 1964–65, as well as the Malcolm Simmonds Memorial Cup in 1959–60. After the top division was renamed the Premier Division, the club won the league again in 1967–68, the Bareham Cup in 1970–71 and the Malcolm Simmonds Memorial Cup in 1973–74. They won the Premier Division and Malcolm Simmonds Memorial Cup double in 1976–77 and retained the cup the following season, before winning another league and cup double in 1979–80, Although an application to join the Sussex County League was rejected in 1980, they were accepted into the league the following year, becoming members of Division Two.

In their first season in Division Two, Midhurst & Easebourne were runners-up, earning promotion to Division One. The club finished bottom of Division One in 1986–87 and were relegated back to Division Two. They won the Division Two Cup in 1988–89, beating Newhaven 5–3 on penalties in a replay. The club returned to Division One after finishing second in 1991–92, but were relegated back to Division Two at the end of the following season. A second successive relegation in 1993–94 saw them drop into Division Three. Although they won Division Three at the first attempt, the club were relegated back to the division at the end of the 1997–98 season.

In 1998–99 Midhurst & Easebourne finished bottom of Division Three and were relegated to the Premier Division of the West Sussex League. They were Premier Division champions and Centenary Cup winners in 2001–02 and were promoted back to Division Three of the Sussex County League. The following season saw them win the Division Three title and the Division Three Cup, earning promotion to Division Two. Although they finished bottom of Division Two in 2009–10, the club avoided being relegated to Division Three. In 2015 the Sussex County League was renamed the Southern Combination, with Division Two becoming Division One. In 2021–22 the club were runners-up in Division One and promoted to the Premier Division.

== Ground ==
After their foundation, the club played at the Rotherfield on Dodsley Road, the former ground of Easebourne. The ground is shared with a cricket club, with spectator facilities including a clubhouse and wooden stand with bench seating.

== Staff ==
- First Team Manager: Connor Hoare
- First Team Assistant Manager: George Davis
- First Team Coach: Ollie Maynard
- First Team Coach: Ethan Wiggins
- First Team Coach: Jonathan Radcliffe
- First Team Coach: Harry Birmingham
- Reserve Team Manager: Sean Brockhurst
- Reserve Team Assistant Manager: Wayne Hyde

== Honours ==
- Southern Combination
  - Division Three champions 1994–95, 2002–03
  - Division Two Cup winners 1988–89
  - Division Three Cup winners 2002–03
- West Sussex League
  - Champions 1955–56, 1962–63, 1964–65, 1967–68, 1976–77, 1979–80
  - Centenary Cup winners 2001–02
  - Malcolm Simmonds Memorial Cup winners 1959–60, 1973–74, 1976–77, 1977–78, 1979–80
  - Bareham Trophy winners 1970–71

== Records ==
- Best FA Cup performance: First qualifying round, 2022–23
- Best FA Vase performance: First round, 2023–24
