= Shoreham F.C. =

Association football club in England

Shoreham FC
- Full name: Shoreham Football Club
- Nickname: The Musselmen
- Founded: 1892
- Ground: Middle Road Stadium, Middle Road, Shoreham-by-Sea
- Capacity: 2,000
- Coordinates: 50°50′5″N 0°15′30″W
- Chairman: Stuart Slaney
- Manager: Alex Laing
- League: Southern Combination Division One
- 2025–26: Southern Combination Premier Division, 20th of 20 (relegated)
- Website: https://shorehamfc.co.uk/default.aspx
Home colours	Away colours

Shoreham Football Club is a football club based in Shoreham-by-Sea, West Sussex, England. The club is affiliated to the Sussex County Football Association. They are currently members of the Southern Combination Division One and their home stadium is Middle Road. The club are nicknamed "The Musselmen" after the town's ancient mussel picking tradition. The club's 2025–26 home kit is all royal blue with black trim, and the 2025–26 away kit is all red with black trim.

== History ==
The club was established in 1892 and was one of the founding members of the West Sussex Football League in 1896. After their first season in the league they were relegated to the Junior Division, but returned immediately as champions the following season. The 1901–02 season saw the club achieve their first senior honours when they beat Hailsham Town 3–0 in the final to lift the Sussex Senior Challenge Cup. More success followed the season later when the club won the West Sussex Football League and the Sussex RUR Cup. They repeated the league success two seasons later, but had to settle as runners up in the Sussex RUR and challenge cups. The 1905–06 campaign saw the club achieve a treble of competition wins when they took the league title, and both the Sussex RUR and challenge cups.

After the First World War the club played in the Brighton, Hove & District Football League, until the end of the 1919–20 season when they became one of the founder members of Sussex County Football League. After seven seasons the club left the Sussex League after finishing bottom with just five points at the end of the 1926–27 campaign, however the club rejoined the Sussex League again for the start of the 1932–33 competition, from the Brighton League. The club then remained in the league up until the Second World War, when play was suspended, during which time they finished as runners-up in the 1934–35 season.

Following the cessation of the Second World War, the club rejoined the Sussex County League when it resumed normal competition in the 1946–47 season. That season also saw the club make their debut in the FA Cup, where they met East Grinstead in the Preliminary qualifying round, but were soundly beaten 11–0.

The 1951–52 season saw the club become champions of the Sussex County League for the first time, and they successfully defended their title the following season. The club saw themselves finish bottom of Division One at the end of the 1960–61 Campaign, but immediately bounced back up as champions of Division Two the following season. The club remained in Division One for four more seasons, before being relegated back to Division Two, but this time did not return for a further six seasons, when they finished as runners-up in the 1972–73 campaign. However their stay in Division One could only last a single season, and it took the club another three seasons to gain promotion again as Champions. The club maintained their winning ways the next season, as they then went on to win the Division One title for the third time in their history.

Four seasons after their Championship win, the club were relegated back to Division Two, and it took the club till the end of the 1984–85 campaign to gain promotion, when they became champions of Division Two. The 1991–92 season saw their seven-year stay in Division One come to an end after finishing in the bottom two. The club regained promotion to Division One in the 1993–94 season, again as champions of Division Two. The club faced relegation six seasons later in the 1999-00 campaign but again bounced back up, this time as runners-up, after just two seasons in Division Two. The club then remained in the top division, except for the 2004–05 season when they were in Division Two but were promoted immediately back to Division One. In 2013 Shoreham had a new owner, Stuart Slaney, who oversaw major expansion; within two years, the club trebled in playing size with a new youth section which gave the club over twenty different age group teams, becoming one of the largest and most vibrant football clubs in the area. In 2015 Ralph Prodger joined Stuart Slaney as joint owner and chairman of the club.

In the 2016–17 season, having topped the league table until the final month, the club finished as runners-up in the Premier Division to Haywards Heath Town. However, after Haywards Heath were penalised by the League with a nine points deduction for fielding an ineligible player in several games, Shoreham became champions and were thus promoted to Division One South of the Isthmian League, the highest level the club had reached in its history. A subsequent formal appeal by Haywards Heath was eventually turned down by the FA, but this lengthy procedural delay meant that Shoreham had no official confirmation as to which league they would be competing in until only eight days before the start of the new season. The lack of time to build a competitive playing squad for the Isthmian League proved significant and the team struggled throughout the 2017–18 season, winning only four matches and eventually being relegated back to the Southern Combination Premier Division.

A further relegation followed immediately in 2018–19, a turbulent season during which the club had three different managers, and the club found itself beginning the 2019–20 season in the second tier of the Southern Combination League for the first time in fifteen years. In May 2019 the club appointed Mark Pulling as first team manager. Shoreham were placed mid table with 14 games left to play when the 2019–20 season was voided due to the COVID-19 pandemic. At the start of the 2020–21 season, Shoreham had played 12 games and were 5th in the table when the league was placed on hold once again, and was later curtailed in February 2021. After a tragic start to 2021 with co-owner Ralph Prodger and his wife Cheryl dying, Malcolm Saunders joined Stuart Slaney as joint owner of the club. The club finished in fifth place at the end of the 2021–22 season and qualified for the play-offs, but were beaten 0–1 in the promotion final by third placed Midhurst and Easebourne FC. Unfortunately Malcolm Saunders sadly passed away in September 2026.

Prior to the start of the 2022–23 season, Shoreham appointed their former player Michael Death as first team manager. This proved to be a very successful decision as the club went on to dominate the league and became champions, comfortably clinching promotion back to the Premier Division but also achieving the notable title of being the last unbeaten team in England in all levels of football that season, having not lost a league game until the end of February. However, once season 2023-24 started the team then did not win a single game in its initial 11 league matches, suffering some dispiriting defeats in the process. Due to this, Michael Death parted company with the club, and head coach Paul Ettridge was appointed as his successor in mid September. The team's form improved satisfactorily and they were able to climb out of the relegation zone, eventually finishing the season in 15th place. In late May 2024, Ettridge moved on and the club welcomed back Michael Death as manager prior to the start of the new season. His return did not go as hoped for; the team continued to struggle and in March 2025, Death departed the club for a second time. A joint player-manager duo of Tom Bold and Tom Cousins took over control of the team till the end of the season and managed to narrowly avoid relegation, with the club staying up on the final day due only to having a superior goal difference.

Before the start of the current 2025-26 season, Lawrence Edwards was appointed to the manager's role, only for him to resign suddenly less than five months later in mid September to take up an offer from Saltdean FC, which was seen by all as very unprofessional but it was his choice. The club was therefore forced to make a quick decision to appoint his successor, Josh Rondel, but his brief spell in charge saw numerous squad changes and some dispiritingly heavy defeats, and with club morale at a low ebb, Rondel left in early November and was replaced by his assistant, Connor Cox. September saw one of the most recent upheaval periods on recent seasons with the sad passing of co-chair Malcolm Saunders and the release of manager Connor Cox. With the parting of Connor Cox, the club then moved to place Alex laign ans the new 1st team manager.

== Ground ==
Shoreham play their home games at Middle Road stadium. As of the 2023–24 season, the ground is officially known as the Edgar & Wood Stadium, as the result of a sponsorship deal with a local company. Floodlights were first installed at the stadium in 1981, paid for in part from funds raised from a well attended friendly match against then top tier club Wimbledon FC, who also donated the original lights from their old Plough Lane stadium. In August 2022 new LED floodlights were installed, providing the club with the most advanced lighting system of any non-league ground in the county. The stadium has a capacity of 2000, including two covered seating areas and one covered standing area.

== Former players ==
- Anthony Barness
- Gavin Geddes
- Alan Haig-Brown
- George Parris
- Nic Taylor
- Charlie Walker

== Honours ==
- Southern Combination
  - Champions: 1951–52, 1952–53, 1977–78, 2016–17
  - Division One champions: 2022–23
  - Division Two champions:1961–62, 1976–77, 1984–85, 1993–94
  - John O'Hara League Challenge Cup winners: 1957–58, 1958–59 (joint winners with Littlehampton), 1995–96, 2005–06, 2007–08
  - Division Two Cup winners: 1974–75, 1982–83, 1993–94
  - Floodlight Cup winners: 1993–94
- West Sussex League
  - Senior Division champions: 1902–03, 1904–05, 1905–06
  - Junior Division champions: 1897–98
- Sussex Senior Cup
  - Winners: 1901–02, 1905–06
- Sussex RUR Cup
  - Winners: 1902–03, 1905–06

== Records ==
- Best FA Cup performance: Second qualifying round, 1994–95, 2010–11, 2013–14
- Best FA Vase performance: Third round 1975–76, 1977–78, 1994–95, 2008–09, 2009–10, 2013–14
- Best League performance: The last unbeaten team in England in all levels of football in the season 2022–23, having not lost a league game until the end of February 2023

== See also ==
- Shoreham F.C. players
- Shoreham F.C. managers
